= European Men's Beach Handball Championship =

European Beach Handball Championship
- Status: active
- Genre: sports event
- Date: midyear
- Frequency: biennial
- Inaugurated: 2000
- Organiser: European Handball Federation

The European Beach Handball Championship is the official competition for senior national beach handball teams of Europe. It was first organized by the EHF in 2000. In addition to crowning the European champions, the tournament also serves as a qualifying tournament for the World Championships.

== Summary ==
Year	Host	Final			Bronze Match		
Year	Host	Gold	Score	Silver	Bronze	Score	Fourth Place
2000; Details	Gaeta, Italy	Belarus	2–1	Spain	Ukraine	2–1	Russia
2002; Details	Cádiz, Spain	Spain	2–0	Russia	Belarus	2–0	Ukraine
2004; Details	Alanya, Turkey	Russia	2–0	Germany	Turkey	2–1	Spain
2006; Details	Cuxhaven, Germany	Spain	2–1	Hungary	Turkey	2–1	Germany
2007; Details	Misano Adriatico, Italy	Russia	2–1	Croatia	Hungary	2–1	Serbia
2009; Details	Larvik, Norway	Croatia	2–0	Russia	Hungary	2–0	Denmark
2011; Details	Umag, Croatia	Croatia	2–0	Russia	Spain	2–1	Ukraine
2013; Details	Randers, Denmark	Croatia	2–0	Russia	Denmark	2–1	Serbia
2015; Details	Lloret de Mar, Spain	Croatia	2–1	Spain	Ukraine	2–1	Hungary
2017; Details	Zagreb, Croatia	Spain	2–0	Russia	Croatia	2–0	Hungary
2019; Details	Stare Jabłonki, Poland	Denmark	2–0	Norway	Hungary	2–0	Russia
2021; Details	Varna, Bulgaria	Denmark	2–0	Croatia	Russia	2–1	Spain
2023; Details	Nazaré, Portugal	Hungary	2–0	Germany	Denmark	2–0	Portugal
2025; Details	Alanya, Turkey	Germany	2–1	Spain	Croatia	2–1	Hungary

=== Medal table ===
Rank	Nation	Gold	Silver	Bronze	Total
1	Croatia	4	2	2	8
2	Spain	3	3	1	7
3	Russia	2	5	1	8
4	Denmark	2	0	2	4
5	Germany	1	2	0	3
6	Hungary	1	1	3	5
7	Belarus	1	0	1	2
8	Norway	0	1	0	1
9	Turkey	0	0	2	2
9	Ukraine	0	0	2	2
Totals (10 entries)		14	14	14	42

== See also ==
- World Men's Beach Handball Championship
- European Women's Beach Handball Championship
- European Beach Handball Tour
