= Turkey women's national beach handball team =

Turkey

Information
- Association: Turkish Handball Federation

Colours
Home	Away

Results

World Games
- Appearances: 1 (First in 2005)
- Best result: 2nd (2005)

World Championship
- Appearances: 3 (First in 2004)
- Best result: 2nd (2004)
- Last updated on Unknown.

Turkey women's national beach handball team
Medal record

Women's beach handball

Representing Turkey

World Championship
Silver medal – second place	2004 El Gouna	

World Games
Bronze medal – third place	2005 Duisburg	Team

European Championship
Silver medal – second place	2002 Cádiz	

The Turkey women's national beach handball team represents Turkey in international beach handball competitions. It is governed by the Turkish Handball Federation.

== Results ==
=== World Championships ===
Year	Position
(Egypt) 2004	2nd place
(Brazil) 2006	5th place
(Spain) 2008	—
(Turkey) 2010	5th place
(Oman) 2012	—
(Brazil) 2014	—
(Hungary) 2016	—
(Russia) 2018	—
(Greece) 2022	—
(China) 2024	—
Total	3/9

=== World Games ===
Year	Position
(Japan) 2001	—
(Germany) 2005	3rd place
(Taiwan) 2009	—
(Colombia) 2013	—
(Poland) 2017	—
(United States) 2022	—
(China) 2025	—
Total	1/7

=== European Championship ===
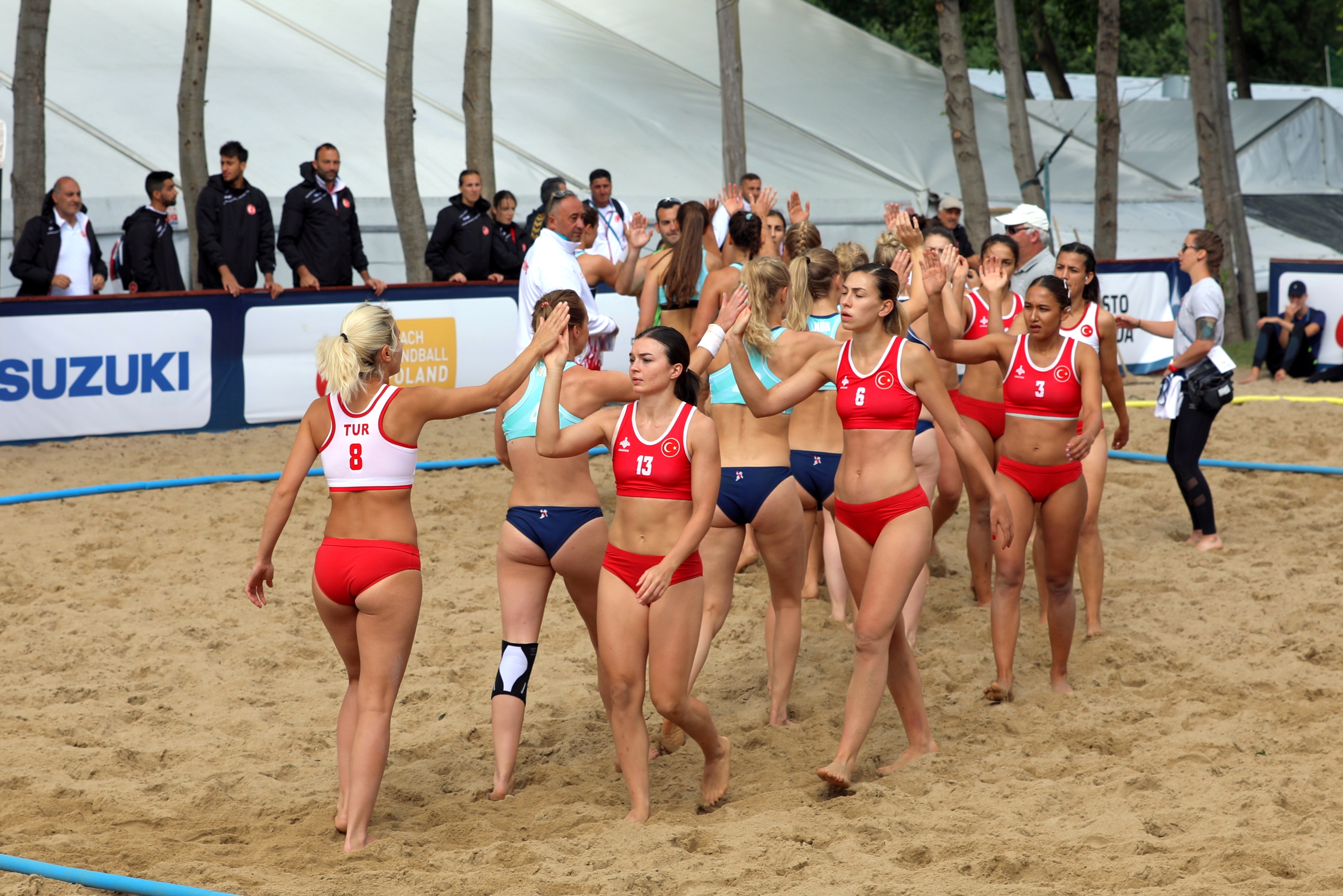
2019

Year	Position
(Italy) 2000	7th place
(Spain) 2002	2nd place
(Turkey) 2004	5th place
(Germany) 2006	4th place
(Italy) 2007	10th place
(Norway) 2009	9th place
(Croatia) 2011	7th place
(Denmark) 2013	10th place
(Spain) 2015	—
(Croatia) 2017	—
(Croatia) 2021	15th place
(Portugal) 2023	—
(Turkey) 2025	12th place
Total 3/13

== Former notable players ==
- Fatma Ay (born 1992)
- Ümmügülsüm Bedel (born 1995)
- Ceyhan Coşkunsu (born 2002)
- Merve Erbektaş (born 1996)
- Diğdem Hoşgör (born 1991)
- Beyza Karaçam (born 2000)
- Sude Karademir (born 2001)
- Gonca Nahcıvanlı (born 1979)
- Ayşenur Sormaz (born 2000)
- Beyzanur Türkyılmaz (born 2001)
- Çağla Yaman (born 1981)
- Yeliz Yılmaz (born 1980)

== See also ==
- Turkey national beach handball team
- Turkish women in sports
