= 2017 European Beach Handball Championship =

- Events: 2

The 2017 European Beach Handball Championship was held in Zagreb, Croatia from 20 to 25 June 2017.

== Format ==
Men's competition contains fourteen teams, split into two groups of seven teams while women's competition contains fifteen teams, split in three groups of five teams. After playing a round-robin, the four top ranked team advanced to the Main Round. Every team kept the points from preliminary round matches against teams who also advanced. In the main round every team had 2 games against the opponents they did not face in the preliminary round. All teams advanced to the Quarter-finals. The two bottom ranked team from each preliminary round group were packed into one group. The points won against the teams who were also in this group were valid.

Matches were played in sets, the team that wins two sets is the winner of a match. When teams are equal in points the head-to-head result was decisive.

== Men ==
=== Preliminary round ===
Team advance to Main Round
Team competes in Placement Round

==== Group A ====
Team	Pld	W	L	SW	SL	Pts
Hungary	6	6	0	12	2	12
Spain	6	5	1	10	5	10
Russia	6	4	2	8	5	8
Denmark	6	3	3	9	7	6
Germany	6	2	4	5	9	4
Netherlands	6	1	5	4	10	2
Poland	6	0	6	2	12	0

Team 1	Score	Team 2
Round 1
Russia	0–2 Archived 2017-06-23 at the Wayback Machine	Spain
Poland	0–2 Archived 2017-06-12 at the Wayback Machine	Hungary
Netherlands	1–2 Archived 2017-06-12 at the Wayback Machine	Denmark
Round 2
Spain	2–1 Archived 2017-06-12 at the Wayback Machine	Netherlands
Hungary	2–1 Archived 2017-06-12 at the Wayback Machine	Denmark
Germany	0–2 Archived 2017-06-12 at the Wayback Machine	Russia
Round 3
Netherlands	0–2 Archived 2017-06-12 at the Wayback Machine	Germany
Hungary	2–0 Archived 2017-06-12 at the Wayback Machine	Russia
Spain	2–1 Archived 2017-06-12 at the Wayback Machine	Poland
Round 4
Denmark	1–2 Archived 2017-06-12 at the Wayback Machine	Spain
Hungary	2–1 Archived 2017-06-12 at the Wayback Machine	Germany
Russia	2–0 Archived 2017-06-12 at the Wayback Machine	Poland
Round 5
Denmark	1–2 Archived 2017-06-12 at the Wayback Machine	Russia
Netherlands	0–2 Archived 2017-06-12 at the Wayback Machine	Hungary
Poland	1–2 Archived 2017-06-12 at the Wayback Machine	Germany
Round 6
Germany	0–2 Archived 2017-06-12 at the Wayback Machine	Spain
Poland	0–2 Archived 2017-06-12 at the Wayback Machine	Denmark
Russia	2–0 Archived 2017-06-12 at the Wayback Machine	Netherlands
Round 7
Poland	0–2 Archived 2017-06-12 at the Wayback Machine	Netherlands
Germany	0–2 Archived 2017-06-12 at the Wayback Machine	Denmark
Spain	0–2 Archived 2017-06-12 at the Wayback Machine	Hungary

==== Group B ====
Team	Pld	W	L	SW	SL	Pts
Ukraine	6	5	1	11	5	10
Croatia	6	5	1	11	3	10
Norway	6	3	3	6	6	6
Sweden	6	3	3	7	8	6
France	6	2	4	6	10	4
Serbia	6	2	4	7	9	4
Switzerland	6	1	5	4	11	2

Team 1	Score	Team 2
Round 1
Serbia	0–2	Croatia
Sweden	0–2	Ukraine
France	1–2	Switzerland
Round 2
Croatia	2–0	France
Ukraine	2–1	Switzerland
Norway	0–2	Serbia
Round 3
France	0–2	Norway
Ukraine	2–1	Serbia
Croatia	2–1	Sweden
Round 4
Switzerland	0–2	Croatia
Ukraine	2–0	Norway
Serbia	1–2	Sweden
Round 5
Switzerland	1–2	Serbia
France	2–1	Ukraine
Sweden	0–2	Norway
Round 6
Norway	0–2	Croatia
Sweden	2–0	Switzerland
Serbia	1–2	France
Round 7
Sweden	2–1	France
Norway	2–0	Switzerland
Croatia	1–2	Ukraine

=== Main round ===
==== Group I ====
Team	Pld	W	L	SW	SL	Pts
Croatia	3	3	0	6	1	6
Hungary	3	2	1	4	2	4
Russia	3	1	2	2	5	2
Sweden	3	0	3	2	6	0

Team 1	Score	Team 2
Round 1
Sweden	0–2	Hungary
Russia	0–2	Croatia
Round 2
Sweden	1–2	Russia
Hungary	0–2	Croatia

==== Group II ====
Team	Pld	W	L	SW	SL	Pts
Spain	3	3	0	6	1	6
Ukraine	3	2	1	4	3	4
Denmark	3	1	2	4	4	2
Norway	3	0	3	0	6	0

Team 1	Score	Team 2
Round 1
Denmark	1–2	Ukraine
Norway	0–2	Spain
Round 2
Denmark	2–0	Norway
Ukraine	0–2	Spain

=== Placement round 9−14 ===
Team	Pld	W	L	SW	SL	Pts
Germany	5	5	0	10	2	10
Poland	5	3	2	7	7	6
Switzerland	5	2	3	6	7	4
Serbia	5	2	3	6	8	4
France	5	2	3	7	7	4
Netherlands	5	1	4	3	8	2

Team 1	Score	Team 2
Round 1
Germany	2–0	Switzerland
Poland	2–1	Serbia
Netherlands	0–2	France
Round 2
Serbia	0–2	Germany
Switzerland	2–0	Netherlands
France	1–2	Poland
Round 3
Poland	2–1	Switzerland
Netherlands	1–2	Serbia
Germany	2–1	France

=== Knockout stage ===
==== Championship bracket ====
Quarter-finals
24 June − 11:00 −
Croatia	2
Norway	1
24 June − 11:00 −
Ukraine	0
Russia	2
24 June − 11:00 −
Spain	2
Sweden	0
24 June − 11:00 −
Hungary	2
Denmark	0

Semi-finals
24 June − 18:00 −
Croatia	1
Russia	2
24 June − 19:00 −
Spain	2
Hungary	1

Final
25 June − 17:00 −
Russia	0
Spain	2
Third place
25 June − 15:00 −
Croatia	2
Hungary	0

5–8th place bracket

5–8th place semifinals
24 June − 17:00 −
Ukraine	2
Norway	1
24 June − 17:00 −
Sweden	2
Denmark	0

5th place
25 June − 12:00 −
Ukraine	1
Sweden	2
7th place
25 June − 12:00 −
Norway	0
Denmark	2

=== Final standings ===
Place	Team
1st place, gold medalist(s)	Spain
2nd place, silver medalist(s)	Russia
3rd place, bronze medalist(s)	Croatia
4	Hungary
5	Sweden
6	Ukraine
7	Denmark
8	Norway
9	Germany
10	Poland
11	Switzerland
12	Serbia
13	France
14	Netherlands

== Women ==
=== Preliminary round ===
Team advance to Main Round
Team competes in Placement Round 13–15

==== Group A ====
Team	Pld	W	L	SW	SL	Pts
Netherlands	4	4	0	8	0	8
Denmark	4	3	1	6	3	6
Russia	4	2	2	4	4	4
Hungary	4	1	3	3	7	2
Germany	4	0	4	1	8	0

Team 1	Score	Team 2
Round 1
Hungary	0–2 Archived 2017-09-21 at the Wayback Machine	Russia
Netherlands	2–0	Germany
Round 2
Germany	1–2	Hungary
Netherlands	2–0	Denmark
Round 3
Germany	0–2 Archived 2017-09-21 at the Wayback Machine	Denmark
Russia	0–2	Netherlands
Round 4
Russia	2–0	Germany
Denmark	2–1	Hungary
Round 5
Denmark	2–0	Russia
Hungary	0–2	Netherlands

==== Group B ====
Team	Pld	W	L	SW	SL	Pts
Norway	4	4	0	8	1	8
Ukraine	4	3	1	6	2	6
Poland	4	2	2	4	4	4
France	4	1	3	2	6	2
Sweden	4	0	4	1	8	0

Team 1	Score	Team 2
Round 1
Norway	2–0 Archived 2017-09-21 at the Wayback Machine	Ukraine
Poland	2–0	Sweden
Round 2
Sweden	1–2	Norway
Poland	2–0	France
Round 3
Sweden	0–2	France
Ukraine	2–0	Poland
Round 4
Ukraine	2–0	Sweden
France	0–2	Norway
Round 5
France	0–2	Ukraine
Norway	2–0	Poland

==== Group C ====
Team	Pld	W	L	SW	SL	Pts
Spain	4	1	1	7	2	6
Greece	4	3	1	6	3	6
Italy	4	2	2	4	5	4
Croatia	4	2	2	6	5	4
Switzerland	4	0	4	0	8	0

Team 1	Score	Team 2
Round 1
Italy	2–1	Croatia
Spain	2–0	Switzerland
Round 2
Switzerland	0–2	Italy
Spain	2–0	Greece
Round 3
Switzerland	0–2	Greece
Croatia	2–1	Spain
Round 4
Croatia	2–0	Switzerland
Greece	2–0	Italy
Round 5
Greece	2–1	Croatia
Italy	0–2	Spain

=== Main round ===
Team advance to Main Round
Team competes in Placement Round 9−12

==== Group I ====
Team	Pld	W	L	SW	SL	Pts
Netherlands	5	5	0	10	2	10
Norway	5	4	1	9	2	8
Greece	5	3	2	7	4	6
France	5	2	3	4	7	4
Hungary	5	1	4	3	8	2
Italy	5	0	5	1	10	0

Team 1	Score	Team 2
Round 1
Netherlands	2–0	Italy
Hungary	1–2	France
Greece	0–2	Norway
Round 2
Netherlands	2–0	France
Norway	2–0	Italy
Greece	2–0	Hungary
Round 3
Netherlands	2–1	Greece
Hungary	0–2	Norway
Italy	0–2 Archived 2017-09-21 at the Wayback Machine	France
Round 4
Hungary	2–0	Italy
Greece	2–0 Archived 2017-09-21 at the Wayback Machine	France
Netherlands	2–1	Norway

==== Group II ====
Team	Pld	W	L	SW	SL	Pts
Spain	5	4	1	9	5	10
Denmark	5	3	2	7	4	6
Russia	5	3	2	7	4	6
Poland	5	2	3	5	8	4
Croatia	5	2	3	5	8	4
Ukraine	5	1	4	4	8	2

Team 1	Score	Team 2
Round 1
Poland	2–1	Denmark
Ukraine	1–2	Croatia
Spain	2–1	Russia
Round 2
Spain	2–1	Poland
Ukraine	0–2	Denmark
Russia	2–0	Croatia
Round 3
Spain	2–1 Archived 2017-09-21 at the Wayback Machine	Ukraine
Denmark	2–0	Croatia
Poland	0–2	Russia
Round 4
Poland	2–1	Croatia
Ukraine	0–2	Russia
Spain	2–0	Denmark

=== Placement round 13−15 ===
Team	Pld	W	L	SW	SL	Pts
Sweden	4	3	1	7	4	6
Germany	4	3	1	6	3	6
Switzerland	4	0	4	2	8	0

Team 1	Score	Team 2
Round 1
Germany	2–0	Switzerland
Round 2
Switzerland	1–2	Sweden
Round 3
Sweden	2–0	Germany
Round 4
Germany	2–0	Switzerland
Round 5
Switzerland	1–2	Sweden
Round 6
Sweden	1–2	Germany

=== Placement round 9−12 ===
Team	Pld	W	L	SW	SL	Pts
Croatia	3	3	0	6	1	6
Hungary	3	2	1	4	3	4
Italy	3	1	2	2	4	2
Ukraine	3	0	3	2	6	0

Team 1	Score	Team 2
Round 1
Ukraine	1–2	Hungary
Italy	0–2	Croatia
Round 2
Croatia	2–0	Hungary
Ukraine	0–2	Italy

=== Knockout stage ===
==== Championship bracket ====
Quarter-finals
24 June − 10:00 −
Netherlands	1
Poland	2
24 June − 10:00 −
Greece	0
Denmark	2
24 June − 10:00 −
Norway	2
Russia	1
24 June − 10:00 −
France	0
Spain	2

Semi-finals
24 June − 16:00 −
Poland	2
Denmark	1
24 June − 17:00 −
Norway	2
Spain	0

Final
25 June − 16:00 −
Poland	0
Norway	2
Third place
25 June − 14:00 −
Denmark	1
Spain	2

5–8th place bracket

5–8th place semifinals
24 June − 16:00 −
Netherlands	1
Greece	2
24 June − 16:00 −
Russia	2
France	1

5th place
25 June − 11:00 −
Greece	0
Russia	2
7th place
25 June − 11:00 −
Netherlands	1
France	2

=== Final standings ===
Place	Team
1st place, gold medalist(s)	Norway
2nd place, silver medalist(s)	Poland
3rd place, bronze medalist(s)	Spain
4	Denmark
5	Russia
6	Greece
7	France
8	Netherlands
9	Croatia
10	Hungary
11	Italy
12	Ukraine
13	Sweden
14	Germany
15	Switzerland
