= Hungary national beach handball team =

Hungary national beach handball team may refer to

- Hungary men's national beach handball team
- Hungary women's national beach handball team
