= Italy women's national beach handball team =

Italy

Information
- Association: Italian Handball Federation

Colours
Home	Away

Results

World Games
- Appearances: 2 (First in 2005)
- Best result: 1st (2009)

World Championship
- Appearances: 7 (First in 2004)
- Best result: 3rd (2004)
- Last updated on Unknown.

Italy women's national beach handball team
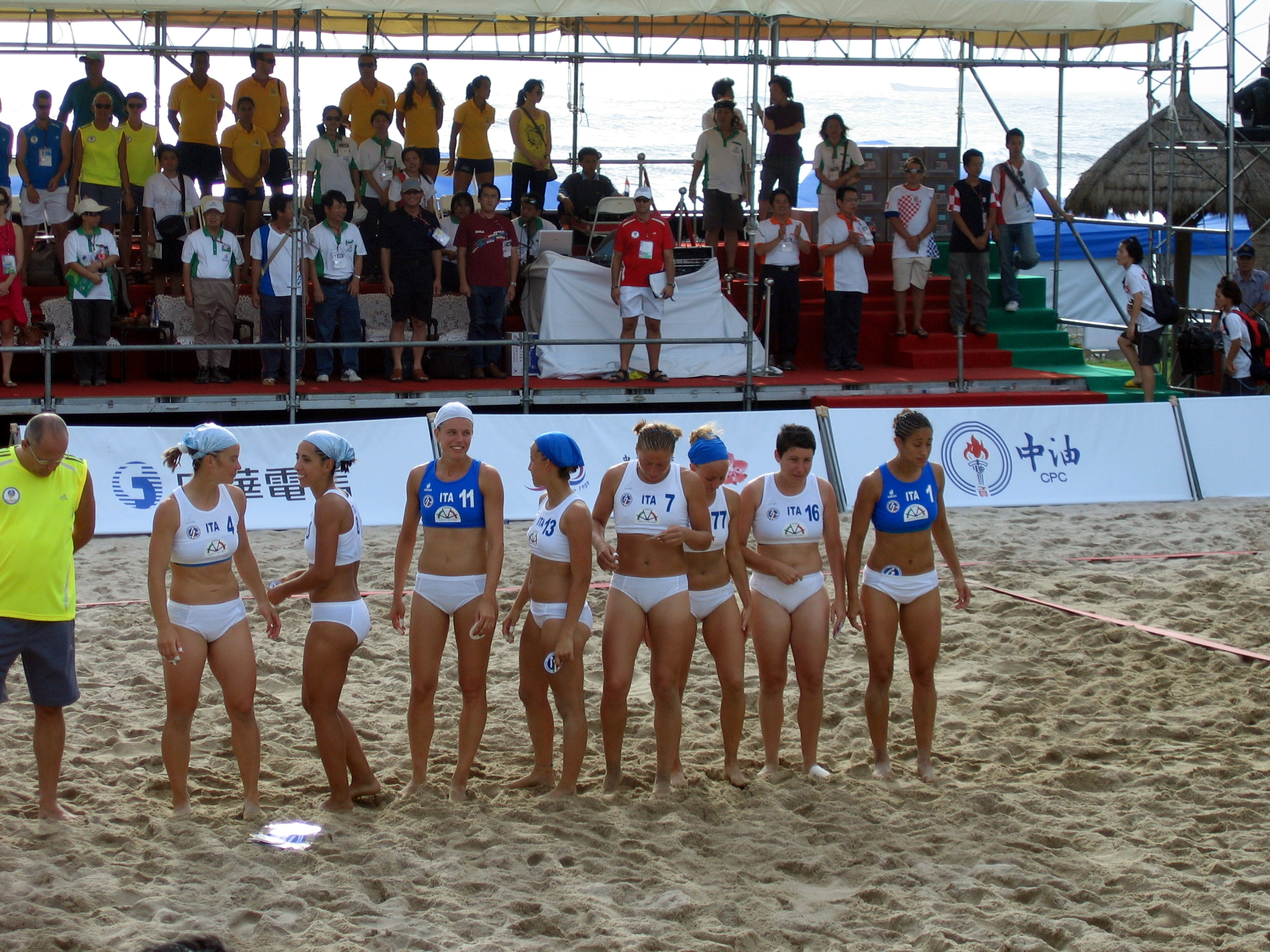

Medal record

World Championship
Bronze medal – third place	2004 Egypt	

The Italy women's national beach handball team is the national team of Italy. It is governed by the Italian Handball Federation and takes part in international beach handball competitions.

In 2012 the coach is Tamas Neukum.

== Results ==
In his history the team won one edition of World Games (2009) and one of the European Championships (2004).

=== World Championship ===
Year	Position
(Egypt) 2004	3rd place
(Brazil) 2006	8th place
(Spain) 2008	4th place
(Turkey) 2010	8th place
(Oman) 2012	7th place
(Brazil) 2014	6th place
(Hungary) 2016	5th place
(Russia) 2018	Did not qualify
(Italy) 2020	Cancelled
(Greece) 2022	Did not qualify
(China) 2024	Did not qualify
Total	7/10

=== European Championship ===
Year	Position
(Italy) 2000	6th place
(Spain) 2002	7th place
(Turkey) 2004	4th place
(Germany) 2006	10th place
(Norway) 2009	1st place
(Croatia) 2011	3rd place
(Denmark) 2013	5th place
(Spain) 2015	3rd place
(Croatia) 2017	11th place
(Poland) 2019	14th place
(Bulgaria) 2021	13th place
(Portugal) 2023	11th place
(Turkey) 2025	Did not qualify
Total	12/13

=== World Games ===
Year	Position
(Japan) 2001	Did not qualify
(Germany) 2005	7th place
(Taiwan) 2009	1st place
(Colombia) 2013	Did not qualify
(Poland) 2017	Did not qualify
(United States) 2022	Did not qualify
(China) 2025	Did not qualify
Total	2/7

== See also ==
- Italy women's national handball team
