= Ukraine national beach handball team =

Ukraine national beach handball team may refer to

- Ukraine men's national beach handball team
- Ukraine women's national beach handball team
