= Serbia national beach handball team =

Serbia national beach handball team may refer to

- Serbia men's national beach handball team
- Serbia women's national beach handball team
