= 2015 European Beach Handball Championship =

- Events: 2

The 2015 European Beach Handball Championship was held in Lloret de Mar, Spain from 30 June to 5 July 2015.

Croatia won the men's event while Hungary were the women's champions.

== Format ==
Men's competition contains twelve teams, split into two groups of six teams while women's competition contains fourteen teams, split in two groups of seven teams. After playing a round-robin, the four top ranked team advanced to the Main Round. Every team kept the points from preliminary round matches against teams who also advanced. In the main round every team had 2 games against the opponents they did not face in the preliminary round. All teams advanced to the Quarter-finals. The two bottom ranked team from each preliminary round group were packed into one group. The points won against the teams who were also in this group were valid.

Matches were played in sets, the team that wins two sets is the winner of a match. When teams are equal in points the head-to-head result was decisive.

== Men ==
=== Seeding ===
Pot 1	Pot 2	Pot 3	Pot 4	Pot 5	Pot 6
Croatia; Russia	Spain; Serbia	Ukraine; Hungary	Poland; Norway	Sweden; Switzerland	Germany; Italy

=== Preliminary round ===
Team advance to Main Round
Team competes in Placement Round

==== Group A ====
Team	Pld	W	L	SW	SL	Pts
Croatia	5	5	0	10	0	10
Spain	5	4	1	8	2	8
Ukraine	5	3	2	6	5	6
Germany	5	2	3	4	7	4
Poland	5	1	4	3	8	2
Sweden	5	0	5	1	10	0

Team 1	Score	Team 2
30 June 2015
Croatia	2−0 Archived 2015-09-24 at the Wayback Machine	Germany
Spain	2−0 Archived 2015-09-24 at the Wayback Machine	Sweden
Ukraine	2−0 Archived 2015-09-24 at the Wayback Machine	Poland
Sweden	0−2 Archived 2015-09-24 at the Wayback Machine	Croatia
Germany	0−2 Archived 2015-07-06 at the Wayback Machine	Ukraine
Poland	0−2 Archived 2015-09-24 at the Wayback Machine	Spain
1 July 2015
Croatia	2−0 Archived 2015-07-02 at the Wayback Machine	Poland
Sweden	0−2 Archived 2015-07-01 at the Wayback Machine	Germany
Spain	2−0 Archived 2015-07-02 at the Wayback Machine	Ukraine
Croatia	2−0 Archived 2015-07-02 at the Wayback Machine	Ukraine
Spain	2−0 Archived 2015-07-02 at the Wayback Machine	Germany
Poland	2−0 Archived 2015-07-02 at the Wayback Machine	Sweden
2 July 2015
Ukraine	2−1 Archived 2015-07-03 at the Wayback Machine	Sweden
Croatia	2−0 Archived 2015-07-04 at the Wayback Machine	Spain
Poland	1−2 Archived 2015-07-03 at the Wayback Machine	Germany

==== Group B ====
Team	Pld	W	L	SW	SL	Pts
Russia	5	5	0	10	2	10
Serbia	5	4	1	9	3	8
Hungary	5	3	2	8	4	6
Norway	5	2	3	4	7	4
Switzerland	5	1	4	3	8	2
Italy	5	0	5	0	10	0

Team 1	Score	Team 2
30 June 2015
Russia	2−0 Archived 2015-09-24 at the Wayback Machine	Italy
Serbia	2−0 Archived 2015-09-24 at the Wayback Machine	Switzerland
Hungary	2−0 Archived 2015-09-24 at the Wayback Machine	Norway
Switzerland	0−2 Archived 2015-09-24 at the Wayback Machine	Russia
Italy	0−2 Archived 2015-09-24 at the Wayback Machine	Hungary
Norway	0−2 Archived 2015-09-24 at the Wayback Machine	Serbia
1 July 2015
Russia	2−0 Archived 2015-07-02 at the Wayback Machine	Norway
Switzerland	2−0 Archived 2015-07-02 at the Wayback Machine	Italy
Serbia	2−1 Archived 2015-07-02 at the Wayback Machine	Hungary
Russia	2−1 Archived 2015-07-02 at the Wayback Machine	Hungary
Serbia	2−0 Archived 2015-07-02 at the Wayback Machine	Italy
Norway	2−1 Archived 2015-07-02 at the Wayback Machine	Switzerland
2 July 2015
Hungary	2−0 Archived 2015-07-04 at the Wayback Machine	Switzerland
Russia	2−1 Archived 2015-07-03 at the Wayback Machine	Serbia
Norway	2−0 Archived 2015-07-04 at the Wayback Machine	Italy

=== Main round ===
==== Group I ====
Team	Pld	W	L	SW	SL	Pts
Croatia	3	2	1	5	2	4
Serbia	3	2	1	5	3	4
Ukraine	3	2	1	4	3	4
Norway	3	0	3	0	6	0

Team 1	Score	Team 2
3 July 2014
Norway	0−2 Archived 2015-07-05 at the Wayback Machine	Croatia
Serbia	1−2 Archived 2015-07-05 at the Wayback Machine	Ukraine
Ukraine	2−0 Archived 2015-07-05 at the Wayback Machine	Norway
Croatia	1−2 Archived 2015-07-05 at the Wayback Machine	Serbia

==== Group II ====
Team	Pld	W	L	SW	SL	Pts
Spain	3	3	0	6	2	6
Russia	3	2	1	5	4	4
Hungary	3	1	2	4	4	2
Germany	3	0	3	1	6	0

Team 1	Score	Team 2
3 July 2014
Germany	1−2 Archived 2015-07-05 at the Wayback Machine	Russia
Spain	2−1 Archived 2015-07-05 at the Wayback Machine	Hungary
Hungary	2−0 Archived 2015-07-05 at the Wayback Machine	Germany
Russia	1−2 Archived 2015-09-24 at the Wayback Machine	Spain

=== Placement round 9−12 ===
Team	Pld	W	L	SW	SL	Pts
Poland	3	2	1	5	3	4
Sweden	3	2	1	5	3	4
Italy	3	1	2	3	5	2
Switzerland	3	1	2	3	5	2

Team 1	Score	Team 2
3 July 2014
Poland	2−1	Sweden
Switzerland	1−2	Italy
4 July 2014
Italy	0−2	Poland
Switzerland	0−2	Sweden
Sweden	2−1	Italy
Poland	1−2	Switzerland

=== Knockout stage ===
==== Championship bracket ====
Quarter-finals
4 July − 12:00 −
Croatia	2
Germany	0
4 July − 13:00 −
Russia	1
Ukraine	2
4 July − 13:00 −
Serbia	1
Hungary	2
4 July − 12:00 −
Spain	2
Norway	1

Semi-finals
4 July − 17:00 −
Croatia	2
Ukraine	1
4 July − 18:45 −
Hungary	1
Spain	2

Final
5 July − 18:45 −
Croatia	2
Spain	1
Third place
5 July − 17:00 −
Ukraine	2
Hungary	1

5–8th place bracket

5–8th place semifinals
4 July − 18:00 −
Germany	0
Russia	2
4 July − 19:00 −
Serbia	2
Norway	1

5th place
5 July − 15:00 −
Russia	2
Serbia	1
7th place
5 July − 15:00 −
Germany	1
Norway	2

=== Final standings ===
Place	Team
1st place, gold medalist(s)	Croatia
2nd place, silver medalist(s)	Spain
3rd place, bronze medalist(s)	Ukraine
4	Hungary
5	Russia
6	Serbia
7	Norway
8	Germany
9	Poland
10	Sweden
11	Italy
12	Switzerland

== Women ==
=== Seeding ===
Pot 1	Pot 2	Pot 3	Pot 4	Pot 5	Pot 6	Pot 7
Hungary; Norway	Italy; Ukraine	Russia; Spain	Switzerland; Croatia	Poland; Sweden	Serbia; Montenegro	Germany; Netherlands

=== Preliminary round ===
Team advance to Main Round
Team competes in Placement Round

==== Group A ====
Team	Pld	W	L	SW	SL	Pts
Hungary	6	5	1	11	3	10
Russia	6	5	1	11	5	10
Italy	6	5	1	10	5	10
Poland	6	3	3	8	6	6
Switzerland	6	2	4	4	7	4
Serbia	6	1	5	3	11	2
Germany	6	0	6	3	12	0

Team 1	Score	Team 2
30 June 2015
Russia	2−1 Archived 2015-09-24 at the Wayback Machine	Hungary
Poland	0−2 Archived 2015-09-24 at the Wayback Machine	Italy
Germany	1−2 Archived 2015-09-24 at the Wayback Machine	Serbia
Hungary	2−0 Archived 2015-09-24 at the Wayback Machine	Germany
Italy	2−0 Archived 2015-09-24 at the Wayback Machine	Serbia
Switzerland	0−2 Archived 2015-09-24 at the Wayback Machine	Russia
Germany	0−2 Archived 2015-09-24 at the Wayback Machine	Switzerland
Italy	2−1 Archived 2015-09-24 at the Wayback Machine	Russia
Hungary	2−1 Archived 2015-09-24 at the Wayback Machine	Poland
1 July 2015
Serbia	0−2 Archived 2015-07-02 at the Wayback Machine	Russia
Germany	1−2 Archived 2015-07-01 at the Wayback Machine	Italy
Poland	2−0 Archived 2015-07-02 at the Wayback Machine	Switzerland
Switzerland	0−2 Archived 2015-07-02 at the Wayback Machine	Hungary
Poland	2−0 Archived 2015-07-02 at the Wayback Machine	Serbia
Russia	2−1 Archived 2015-07-02 at the Wayback Machine	Germany
Poland	2−0 Archived 2015-07-02 at the Wayback Machine	Germany
Switzerland	2−1 Archived 2015-07-02 at the Wayback Machine	Serbia
Hungary	2−0 Archived 2015-07-02 at the Wayback Machine	Italy
2 July 2015
Serbia	0−2 Archived 2015-07-04 at the Wayback Machine	Hungary
Italy	2−1 Archived 2015-07-03 at the Wayback Machine	Switzerland
Russia	2−1 Archived 2015-07-03 at the Wayback Machine	Poland

==== Group B ====
Team	Pld	W	L	SW	SL	Pts
Norway	6	6	0	12	2	12
Spain	6	4	2	9	4	8
Netherlands	6	4	2	10	5	8
Ukraine	6	4	2	8	6	8
Croatia	6	2	4	6	8	4
Sweden	6	1	5	3	10	2
Montenegro	6	0	6	0	12	0

Team 1	Score	Team 2
30 June 2015
Spain	0−2 Archived 2015-09-24 at the Wayback Machine	Norway
Sweden	0−2 Archived 2015-09-24 at the Wayback Machine	Ukraine
Netherlands	2−0 Archived 2015-09-24 at the Wayback Machine	Montenegro
Norway	2−1 Archived 2015-09-24 at the Wayback Machine	Netherlands
Ukraine	2−0 Archived 2015-09-24 at the Wayback Machine	Montenegro
Croatia	0−2 Archived 2015-09-24 at the Wayback Machine	Spain
Netherlands	2−0 Archived 2015-09-24 at the Wayback Machine	Croatia
Ukraine	0−2 Archived 2015-09-24 at the Wayback Machine	Spain
Norway	2−0 Archived 2015-09-24 at the Wayback Machine	Sweden
1 July 2015
Montenegro	0−2 Archived 2015-07-02 at the Wayback Machine	Spain
Netherlands	1−2 Archived 2015-07-01 at the Wayback Machine	Ukraine
Sweden	1−2 Archived 2015-07-02 at the Wayback Machine	Croatia
Croatia	1−2 Archived 2015-07-02 at the Wayback Machine	Norway
Sweden	2−0 Archived 2015-07-02 at the Wayback Machine	Montenegro
Spain	1−2 Archived 2015-07-02 at the Wayback Machine	Netherlands
Sweden	0-2 Archived 2015-07-02 at the Wayback Machine	Netherlands
Croatia	2−0 Archived 2015-07-02 at the Wayback Machine	Montenegro
Norway	2−0 Archived 2015-07-02 at the Wayback Machine	Ukraine
2 July 2015
Montenegro	0−2 Archived 2015-07-04 at the Wayback Machine	Norway
Ukraine	2−1 Archived 2015-07-03 at the Wayback Machine	Croatia
Spain	2−0 Archived 2015-07-04 at the Wayback Machine	Sweden

=== Main round ===
==== Group I ====
Team	Pld	W	L	SW	SL	Pts
Spain	3	3	0	6	1	6
Hungary	3	2	1	4	3	4
Ukraine	3	1	2	3	4	2
Italy	3	0	3	1	6	0

Team 1	Score	Team 2
3 July 2014
Ukraine	1−2 Archived 2015-07-05 at the Wayback Machine	Hungary
Spain	2−1 Archived 2015-07-05 at the Wayback Machine	Italy
Italy	0−2 Archived 2015-09-24 at the Wayback Machine	Ukraine
Hungary	0−2 Archived 2015-07-05 at the Wayback Machine	Spain

==== Group II ====
Team	Pld	W	L	SW	SL	Pts
Netherlands	3	2	1	5	3	4
Norway	3	2	1	5	4	4
Russia	3	2	1	4	4	4
Poland	3	0	3	3	6	0

Team 1	Score	Team 2
3 July 2014
Poland	1−2 Archived 2015-07-05 at the Wayback Machine	Norway
Russia	0−2 Archived 2015-07-05 at the Wayback Machine	Netherlands
Netherlands	2−1 Archived 2015-07-05 at the Wayback Machine	Poland
Norway	2−1 Archived 2015-07-05 at the Wayback Machine	Russia

=== Placement round 9−14 ===
Team	Pld	W	L	SW	SL	Pts
Croatia	5	5	0	10	1	10
Switzerland	5	4	1	8	3	8
Serbia	5	3	2	7	5	6
Sweden	5	2	3	5	6	4
Germany	5	1	4	3	8	2
Montenegro	5	0	5	0	10	0

Team 1	Score	Team 2
3 July 2014
Switzerland	2−0	Montenegro
Germany	0−2	Sweden
Serbia	0−2	Croatia
Sweden	0−2	Switzerland
Montenegro	0−2	Serbia
Croatia	2−0	Germany
4 July 2014
Germany	2−0	Montenegro
Serbia	2−0	Sweden
Switzerland	0−2	Croatia

=== Knockout stage ===
==== Championship bracket ====
Quarter-finals
4 July − 10:00 −
Spain	2
Poland	0
4 July − 11:00 −
Norway	2
Ukraine	1
4 July − 11:00 −
Hungary	2
Russia	1
4 July − 10:00 −
Netherlands	1
Italy	2

Semi-finals
4 July − 18:00 −
Spain	1
Norway	2
4 July − 16:00 −
Hungary	2
Italy	1

Final
5 July − 19:30 −
Norway	1
Hungary	2
Third place
5 July − 18:00 −
Spain	1
Italy	2

5–8th place bracket

5–8th place semifinals
4 July − 16:00 −
Poland	2
Ukraine	1
4 July − 17:00 −
Russia	0
Netherlands	2

5th place
5 July − 14:00 −
Poland	2
Netherlands	0
7th place
5 July − 14:00 −
Ukraine	1
Russia	2

=== Final standings ===
Place	Team
1st place, gold medalist(s)	Hungary
2nd place, silver medalist(s)	Norway
3rd place, bronze medalist(s)	Italy
4	Spain
5	Poland
6	Netherlands
7	Russia
8	Ukraine
9	Croatia
10	Switzerland
11	Serbia
12	Sweden
13	Germany
14	Montenegro
