= 2025 European Beach Handball Championship =

International sports event

- Dates: 8–13 July
- Host city: Alanya, Turkey
- Events: 2

The 2025 European Beach Handball Championship was held in Alanya, Turkey from 8 to 13 July 2025. All results, schedules and news regarding the EHF Beach Handball EURO can be found at the site.

== Format ==
The men's and women's competition began in the preliminary round with sixteen teams, divided into four groups. The top three teams from each group advance to the Main Round where they are divided into two groups of six and while the fourth teams are sent to the Consolation Round. Top 4 teams in two groups of the main round played 1st and 4th, 2nd and 3rd and advanced to the quarterfinals, semifinals and finals. Teams eliminated in the main round continued to play against teams from the consolation round. The groups in the preliminary round played a round-robin, while in the main round they only play against teams they had not played before, since the results of the preliminary round carried forward into the main round only in team matches who had also progressed.

== Broadcasters ==
United States, France, Turkey — BEIN SPORT

Bosnia and Herzegovina, Croatia, Montenegro, Serbia, Slovenia — ARENA SPORT 1

Czech Republic — CESKA TELEVIZE 2

Denmark, Finland, Norway, Sweden — VIAPLAY

Spain — Spanish Handball Federation

Germany, Austria, Switzerland — DYN

Hungary — MTVA

Italy — PALLAMANO TV

Canada Japan - DAZN

Netherlands — ZIGGO

Poland — EUROSPORT

Portugal — SPORT TV

Romania — PRIMA SPORT DIGI

Russia — MATCH TV

Slovakia — JOJ SPORT

Worldwide — EHFTV

== Men's Tournament ==
=== Preliminary round ===
Team advance to Main round
Team advance to Consolation round

==== Group A ====
Pos	Team	Pld	W	L	SW	SL	SD	GPF	GPA	GPD	Pts
1	Denmark	3	3	0	6	0	+6	145	100	+45	6
2	Croatia	3	2	1	4	3	+1	152	112	+40	4
3	Poland	3	1	2	3	4	-1	117	132	-15	2
4	Malta	3	0	3	0	6	-6	62	132	-70	0

==== Group B ====
Pos	Team	Pld	W	L	SW	SL	SD	GPF	GPA	GPD	Pts
1	Germany	3	3	0	6	0	+6	137	98	+39	6
2	Portugal	3	2	1	4	2	+2	117	102	+15	4
3	Turkey	3	1	2	2	5	-3	103	123	-20	2
4	Czech Republic	3	0	3	1	6	-5	102	135	-33	0

==== Group C ====
Pos	Team	Pld	W	L	SW	SL	SD	GPF	GPA	GPD	Pts
1	Spain	3	2	1	5	2	+3	130	94	+36	4
2	Sweden	3	2	1	4	2	+2	118	85	+33	4
3	France	3	2	1	4	3	+1	146	109	+37	4
4	Bulgaria	3	0	3	0	6	-6	70	176	-106	0

==== Group D ====
Pos	Team	Pld	W	L	SW	SL	SD	GPF	GPA	GPD	Pts
1	Hungary	3	3	0	6	1	+5	150	116	+34	6
2	Norway	3	2	1	4	2	+2	125	117	+8	4
3	Italy	3	1	2	3	5	-2	140	144	-4	2
4	Ukraine	3	0	3	1	6	-5	118	155	-37	0

=== Main round ===
Team advance to Quarterfinals
Team advance to Cross matches 9−12

==== Group I ====
Team	Pld	W	L	SW	SL	SD	PF	PF	PD	Pts
Germany	5	4	1	9	2	+7	240	199	+41	8
Denmark	5	4	1	8	3	+5	226	196	+30	8
Croatia	5	4	1	8	5	+3	251	232	+19	8
Portugal	5	2	3	6	6	0	213	210	+3	4
Poland	5	1	4	3	8	–5	209	241	–32	2
Turkey	5	0	5	0	10	–10	156	217	–61	0

==== Group II ====
Team	Pld	W	L	SW	SL	SD	PF	PF	PD	Pts
Hungary	5	4	1	9	3	+6	251	216	+35	8
France	5	3	2	7	6	+1	243	213	+12	6
Spain	5	3	2	7	5	+2	217	210	+7	6
Italy	5	2	3	5	8	–3	211	245	–34	4
Sweden	5	2	3	5	6	–1	204	201	+3	4
Norway	5	1	4	3	8	–5	222	245	–23	2

==== Consolation Round ====
Team	Pld	W	L	SW	SL	SD	PF	PF	PD	Pts
Bulgaria	3	3	0	6	1	+5	142	116	+26	6
Czech Republic	3	2	1	4	3	+1	136	120	+16	4
Ukraine	3	1	2	4	4	0	127	110	+17	2
Malta	3	0	3	0	6	-6	73	132	-59	0

=== Placement round ===
Quarterfinals
France	1
Croatia	2
Germany	2
Italy	0
Denmark	1
Spain	2
Hungary	2
Portugal	1

Semifinals
Croatia	1
Germany	2
Spain	2
Hungary	1

Finale
Germany	2
Spain	1
3rd place
Croatia	2
Hungary	1

=== Final standings ===
Place	Team
1st place, gold medalist(s)	Germany
2nd place, silver medalist(s)	Spain
3rd place, bronze medalist(s)	Croatia
4	Hungary
5	France
6	Portugal
7	Denmark
8	Italy
9	Poland
10	Sweden
11	Norway
12	Turkey
13	Bulgaria
14	Czech Republic
15	Ukraine
16	Malta

== Women's Tournament ==
=== Preliminary round ===
Team advance to Main round
Team advance to Consolation round

==== Group A ====
Pos	Team	Pld	W	L	SW	SL	SD	GPF	GPA	GPD	Pts
1	Denmark	3	3	0	6	1	+5	121	96	+25	6
2	Germany	3	2	1	5	2	+3	145	87	+58	4
3	Poland	3	1	2	2	4	–2	102	115	–13	2
4	Bulgaria	3	0	3	0	6	–6	60	130	–70	0

==== Group B ====
Pos	Team	Pld	W	L	SW	SL	SD	GPF	GPA	GPD	Pts
1	France	3	3	0	6	1	+5	125	97	+28	6
2	Norway	3	2	1	4	2	+2	106	101	+5	4
3	Portugal	3	1	2	3	5	–2	130	133	–3	2
4	Turkey	3	0	3	1	6	–5	94	124	–30	0

==== Group C ====
Pos	Team	Pld	W	L	SW	SL	SD	GPF	GPA	GPD	Pts
1	Netherlands	3	3	0	6	0	+6	143	91	+52	6
2	Greece	3	2	1	4	3	+1	116	123	–4	4
3	Sweden	3	1	2	2	4	–2	105	114	–9	2
4	Croatia	3	0	3	1	6	–5	89	128	–39	0

==== Group D ====
Pos	Team	Pld	W	L	SW	SL	SD	GPF	GPA	GPD	Pts
1	Hungary	3	3	0	6	1	+5	141	99	+42	6
2	Spain	3	2	1	4	2	+2	118	94	+24	4
3	Ukraine	3	1	2	3	4	–1	115	117	–2	2
4	Slovakia	3	0	3	0	6	–6	80	144	–64	0

=== Main round ===
Team advance to Quarterfinals
Team advance to Cross matches 9−12

==== Group I ====
Team	Pld	W	L	SW	SL	SD	GPF	GPA	GPD	Pts
Germany	5	4	1	9	2	+7	206	142	64	8
France	5	4	1	8	3	5	202	191	11	8
Norway	5	3	2	6	5	1	182	194	–12	6
Denmark	5	3	2	7	5	2	227	219	8	6
Portugal	5	1	4	3	9	–6	207	222	–15	2
Poland	5	0	5	1	10	–9	171	227	–56	0

==== Group II ====
Team	Pld	W	L	SW	SL	SD	GPF	GPA	GPD	Pts
Netherlands	5	5	0	10	1	9	233	167	66	10
Hungary	5	4	1	9	4	5	196	179	17	8
Spain	5	3	2	6	4	2	183	151	32	6
Greece	5	2	3	5	6	–1	186	194	–8	4
Sweden	5	1	4	2	9	–7	149	207	–58	2
Ukraine	5	0	5	2	10	–8	183	232	–49	0

==== Consolation Round ====
Team	Pld	W	L	SW	SL	SD	GPF	GPA	GPD	Pts
Croatia	3	3	0	6	1	5	127	111	16	6
Turkey	3	2	1	5	3	2	136	108	28	4
Slovakia	3	1	2	2	5	–3	115	132	–17	2
Bulgaria	3	0	3	2	6	–4	119	146	–27	0

=== Placement round ===
Quarterfinals
Hungary	1
Norway	2
Germany	2
Greece	0
France	0
Spain	2
Netherlands	2
Denmark	1

Semifinals
Norway	2
Germany	0
Spain	2
Netherlands	0

Finale
Norway	1
Spain	2
3rd place
Germany	2
Netherlands	1

Cross matches 5−8
Hungary	1
Greece	2
France	0
Denmark	2

5th place
Greece	0
Denmark	2
7th place
Hungary	2
France	1

9th place
Portugal	1
Sweden	2

11th place
Poland	2
Ukraine	1

=== Final standings ===
Place	Team
1st place, gold medalist(s)	Spain
2nd place, silver medalist(s)	Norway
3rd place, bronze medalist(s)	Germany
4	Netherlands
5	Denmark
6	Greece
7	Hungary
8	France
9	Sweden
10	Portugal
11	Poland
12	Ukraine
13	Croatia
14	Turkey
15	Slovakia
16	Bulgaria

== Results ==
- Men's EHF Beach Handball EURO 2025
- Women's EHF Beach Handball EURO 2025
