= 2013 European Beach Handball Championship =

- Events: 2

The 2013 European Beach Handball Championship was held in Randers, Denmark from 9–14 July. The men's competition was won by Croatia, while the women's tournament was won by Hungary.

== Men's tournament ==
=== Preliminary round ===
==== Group A ====
Team	Pld	W	L	SW	SL	Pts
Croatia	5	4	1	9	2	8
Hungary	5	4	1	8	4	8
Ukraine	5	4	1	8	3	8
Serbia	5	1	4	4	8	2
Sweden	5	1	4	3	9	2
Turkey	5	1	4	3	9	2

Team 1	Score	Team 2
9 July 2013
Sweden	0–2	Croatia
Ukraine	2–0	Turkey
Hungary	2–1	Serbia
Turkey	0-2	Croatia
Sweden	0-2	Hungary
Serbia	0-2	Ukraine
10 July 2013
Croatia	2-0	Serbia
Turkey	2-1	Sweden
Ukraine	0-2	Hungary
Croatia	2-0	Hungary
Ukraine	2-0	Sweden
Serbia	2-0	Turkey
11 July 2013
Hungary	2-1	Turkey
Croatia	1-2	Ukraine
Serbia	1-2	Sweden

==== Group B ====
Team	Pld	W	L	SW	SL	Pts
Norway	6	5	1	11	4	10
Russia	6	5	1	11	3	10
Denmark	6	4	2	9	6	8
Spain	6	3	3	8	6	6
Poland	6	3	3	7	8	6
Switzerland	6	1	5	3	11	2
Italy	6	0	6	1	12	0

Team 1	Score	Team 2
9 July 2013
Denmark	2-1	Spain
Poland	1-2	Russia
Italy	0-2	Norway
Russia	2-0	Denmark
Italy	1-2	Spain
Norway	0-2	Switzerland
10 July 2013
Italy	1-2	Switzerland
Spain	2-0	Poland
Norway	1-2	Denmark
Norway	2-1	Spain
Switzerland	0-2	Russia
Denmark	1-2	Poland
Russia	2-0	Italy
Spain	2-0	Switzerland
Poland	0-2	Norway
11 July 2013
Russia	1-2	Norway
Switzerland	0-2	Denmark
Poland	2-0	Italy
Spain	0-2	Russia
Denmark	2-0	Italy
Switzerland	1-2	Poland

=== Main round ===
==== Group I ====
Team	Pld	W	L	SW	SL	Pts
Ukraine	3	2	1	4	3	4
Croatia	3	2	1	5	4	4
Russia	3	1	2	3	4	2
Spain	3	1	2	3	4	2

Team 1	Score	Team 2
11 July 2013
Croatia	1-2	Ukraine
Spain	0-2	Russia
12 July 2013
Spain	1-2	Croatia
Ukraine	2-0	Russia
Spain	2-0	Ukraine
Croatia	2-1	Russia

==== Group II ====
Team	Pld	W	L	SW	SL	Pts
Denmark	3	3	0	6	2	6
Hungary	3	2	1	4	3	4
Norway	3	1	2	3	5	2
Serbia	3	0	3	3	6	0

Team 1	Score	Team 2
11 July 2013
Denmark	2-1	Norway
Hungary	2-1	Serbia
12 July 2013
Serbia	1-2	Norway
Denmark	2-0	Hungary
Serbia	1-2	Denmark
Norway	0-2	Hungary

=== Consolation round ===
Team	Pld	W	L	SW	SL	Pts
Poland	4	3	1	7	2	6
Turkey	4	3	1	6	3	6
Sweden	4	3	1	6	3	6
Switzerland	4	1	3	3	7	2
Italy	4	0	4	1	8	0

Team 1	Score	Team 2
12 July 2013
Poland	2-0	Turkey
Switzerland	2-1	Italy
Sweden	2-0	Switzerland
Turkey	2-0	Italy
Sweden	2-0	Italy
Poland	2-0	Switzerland
13 July 2013
Sweden	0-2	Turkey
Poland	2-0	Italy
Sweden	2-1	Poland
Turkey	2-1	Switzerland

=== Knockout stage ===
==== Championship bracket ====
Quarter-finals
13 July
Ukraine	1
Serbia	2
13-July
Russia	2
Hungary	1
13 July
Spain	1
Denmark	2
13 July
Croatia	2
Norway	1

Semi-finals
13 July
Serbia	1
Russia	2
13 July
Denmark	1
Croatia	2

Final
14 July
Russia	0
Croatia	2
Third place
14 July
Serbia	1
Denmark	2

==== 5th-8th place ====
5th-8th place
Ukraine	2
Hungary	0
Norway	1
Spain	2

5th place
Ukraine	0
Spain	2
7th place
Hungary	2
Norway	0

=== Final standings ===
Place	Team
1st place, gold medalist(s)	Croatia
2nd place, silver medalist(s)	Russia
3rd place, bronze medalist(s)	Denmark
4	Serbia
5	Spain
6	Ukraine
7	Hungary
8	Norway
9	Poland
10	Turkey
11	Sweden
12	Switzerland
13	Italy

== Women's tournament ==
=== Preliminary round ===
==== Group A ====
Team	Pld	W	L	SW	SL	Pts
Hungary	5	5	0	10	2	10
Ukraine	5	4	1	9	3	8
Russia	5	3	2	6	7	6
Norway	5	2	3	7	6	4
Croatia	5	1	4	3	8	2
Poland	5	0	5	1	10	0

Team 1	Score	Team 2
9 July 2013
Russia	2-1	Croatia
Norway	1-2	Ukraine
Hungary	2–0	Poland
Ukraine	2-0	Croatia
Hungary	0-2	Russia
Poland	0-2	Norway
10 July 2013
Croatia	2-0	Poland
Ukraine	2-0	Russia
Norway	1-2	Hungary
Croatia	0-2	Hungary
Norway	1-2	"Russia"
Poland	0-2	Ukraine
11 July 2013
Hungary	2-1	Ukraine
Croatia	0-2	Norway
Poland	1-2	Russia

==== Group B ====
Team	Pld	W	L	SW	SL	Pts
Denmark	6	6	0	12	2	12
Spain	6	5	1	11	2	10
Italy	6	4	2	9	4	8
Turkey	6	2	4	5	8	4
Greece	6	2	4	5	9	4
Switzerland	6	2	4	4	9	4
Sweden	6	0	6	0	12	0

Team 1	Score	Team 2
9 July 2013
Turkey	0-2	Italy
Switzerland	0-2	Denmark
Sweden	0-2	Italy
Spain	2-0	Greece
10 July 2013
Sweden	0-2	Greece
Italy	2-0	Switzerland
Spain	2-0	Turkey
Spain	2-0	Italy
Greece	0-2	Denmark
Turkey	2-0	Switzerland
Denmark	2-0	Sweden
Italy	2-0	Greece
Switzerland	2-0	Spain
11 July 2013
Denmark	2-1	Spain
Greece	2-1	Turkey
Switzerland	2-0	Sweden
Italy	1-2	Denmark
Turkey	2-0	Sweden
Greece	1-2	Switzerland
Denmark	2-0	Italy
Switzerland	1-2	Poland

=== Main round ===
==== Group I ====
Team	Pld	W	L	SW	SL	Pts
Hungary	3	3	0	6	0	6
Russia	3	1	2	3	4	2
Spain	3	1	2	2	4	2
Turkey	3	1	2	2	5	2

Team 1	Score	Team 2
11 July 2013
Russia	0-2	Hungary
Spain	2-0	Turkey
12 July 2013
Turkey	0-2	Hungary
Russia	2-0	Spain
Turkey	2-1	Russia
Hungary	2-0	Spain

==== Group II ====
Team	Pld	W	L	SW	SL	Pts
Ukraine	3	3	0	6	2	6
Norway	3	2	1	5	2	4
Denmark	3	1	2	3	5	2
Italy	3	0	3	1	6	0

Team 1	Score	Team 2
11 July 2013
Italy	1-2	Denmark
Norway	1-2	Ukraine
12 July 2013
Norway	2-0	Denmark
Italy	0-2	Ukraine
Norway	2-0	Italy
Denmark	1-2	Ukraine

=== Consolation round ===
Team	Pld	W	L	SW	SL	Pts
Croatia	4	4	0	8	0	8
Switzerland	4	3	1	6	5	6
Greece	4	2	2	5	4	4
Poland	4	1	3	3	6	2
Sweden	4	0	4	1	8	0

Team 1	Score	Team 2
12 July 2013
Greece	2-0	Poland
Switzerland	2-1	Sweden
Croatia	2-0	Switzerland
Poland	2-0	Sweden
Croatia	2-0	Sweden
Greece	1-2	Switzerland
13 July 2013
Croatia	2-0	Poland
Greece	2-0	Sweden
Croatia	2-0	Sweden
Poland	1-2	Switzerland

=== Knockout stage ===
==== Championship bracket ====
Quarter-finals
13 July
Hungary	2
Italy	0
13 July
Spain	0
Norway	2
13 July
Turkey	0
Ukraine	2
13 July
Russia	0
Denmark	2

Semi-finals
13 July
Hungary	2
Norway	0
13 July
Ukraine	0
Denmark	2

Final
14 July
Hungary	2
Denmark	1
Third place
14 July
Norway	2
Ukraine	1

==== 5th-8th place ====
5th-8th place
Italy	2
Spain	1
Turkey	1
Russia	2

5th place
Italy	2
Russia	0
7th place
Spain	2
Turkey	0

=== Final standings ===
Place	Team
1st place, gold medalist(s)	Hungary
2nd place, silver medalist(s)	Denmark
3rd place, bronze medalist(s)	Norway
4	Ukraine
5	Italy
6	Russia
7	Spain
8	Turkey
9	Croatia
10	Switzerland
11	Greece
12	Poland
13	Sweden
