= Sweden national beach handball team =

Sweden national beach handball team may refer to

- Sweden men's national beach handball team
- Sweden women's national beach handball team
