= 2011 European Beach Handball Championship =

- Events: 2

The 2011 European Beach Handball Championship was held in Umag, Croatia from 4–9 July. Croatia was the defending men's champion, while Italy was the defending women's champion.

== Draw ==
The group draw was held for both genders was held on 25 May 2011.

== Men ==
=== Preliminary round ===
Team advanced to Main Round
Team competes in consolation round

==== Group A ====
Team	Pld	W	L	SW	SL	Pts
Russia	4	4	0	8	0	8
Norway	4	3	1	6	4	6
Serbia	4	2	2	5	5	4
Turkey	4	1	3	4	6	2
Greece	4	0	4	0	8	0

July 4, 2011

Russia	2–0	Turkey
Norway	2–1	Serbia
Norway	2–0	Greece
Serbia	0–2	Russia
Greece	0–2	Turkey

July 5, 2011

Serbia	2–0	Greece
Turkey	1–2	Norway
Greece	0–2	Russia
Turkey	1–2	Serbia
Russia	2–0	Norway

==== Group B ====
Team	Pld	W	L	SW	SL	Pts
Croatia	4	4	0	8	0	8
Spain	4	3	1	6	2	6
Poland	4	2	2	4	5	4
Cyprus	4	1	3	3	6	2
Sweden	4	0	4	0	8	0

July 4, 2011

Croatia	2–0	Poland
Spain	2–0	Sweden
Sweden	0–2	Croatia
Spain	2–0	Cyprus
Cyprus	1–2	Poland

July 5, 2011

Sweden	0–2	Cyprus
Poland	0–2	Spain
Cyprus	0–2	Croatia
Poland	2–0	Sweden
Croatia	2–0	Spain

==== Group C ====
Team	Pld	W	L	SW	SL	Pts
Hungary	4	4	0	8	0	8
Ukraine	4	3	1	6	3	6
Denmark	4	2	2	5	5	4
(North Macedonia) Macedonia	4	1	3	3	7	2
Switzerland	4	0	4	1	8	0

July 4, 2011

Hungary	2–0	Ukraine
Denmark	2–0	Switzerland
Switzerland	0–2	Hungary
Denmark	2–1	Macedonia
Macedonia	0–2	Ukraine

July 5, 2011

Ukraine	2–1	Denmark
Switzerland	1–2	Macedonia
Hungary	2–0	Denmark
Ukraine	2–0	Switzerland
Macedonia	0–2	Hungary

=== Main Round ===
Team advanced to Quarterfinals
Team competes in Placement matches

==== Group I ====
Team	Pld	W	L	SW	SL	Pts
Croatia	5	5	0	10	0	10
Russia	5	4	1	8	3	8
Ukraine	5	3	2	6	6	6
Denmark	5	2	3	6	6	4
Turkey	5	1	4	3	8	2
Cyprus	5	0	5	0	10	0

July 6, 2011

Russia	2–1	Denmark
Turkey	2–0	Cyprus
Croatia	2–0	Ukraine

July 7, 2011

Russia	2–0	Cyprus
Denmark	0–2	Croatia
Ukraine	2–1	Turkey
Russia	2–0	Ukraine
Croatia	2–0	Turkey
Denmark	2–0	Cyprus
Denmark	2–0	Turkey
Cyprus	0–2	Ukraine
Russia	0–2	Croatia

==== Group II ====
Team	Pld	W	L	SW	SL	Pts
Spain	5	5	0	10	1	10
Hungary	5	4	1	9	4	8
Norway	5	3	2	7	6	6
Serbia	5	2	3	6	6	4
Poland	5	1	4	2	9	2
(North Macedonia) Macedonia	5	0	5	2	10	0

July 6, 2011

Norway	2–0	Poland
Macedonia	0–2	Spain
Hungary	2–1	Serbia

July 7, 2011

Poland	0–2	Hungary
Norway	0–2	Spain
Serbia	2–0	Macedonia
Hungary	1–2	Spain
Norway	2–1	Macedonia
Serbia	2–0	Poland
Poland	2–1	Macedonia
Spain	2–0	Serbia
Hungary	2–1	Norway

=== Consolation round ===
==== Places 13–15 ====
===== Group III =====
Team	Pld	W	L	SW	SL	Pts
Greece	4	4	0	8	2	8
Sweden	4	1	3	5	6	2
Switzerland	4	1	3	2	7	2

July 7, 2011

Greece	2–1	Switzerland
Switzerland	1–2	Sweden
Sweden	0–2	Greece

July 8, 2011

Greece	2–1	Switzerland
Switzerland	2–0	Sweden
Sweden	0–2	Greece

==== Places 9–12 ====
===== Group IV =====
Team	Pld	W	L	SW	SL	Pts
Turkey	3	3	0	6	1	6
Poland	3	2	1	5	3	4
Cyprus	3	1	2	2	5	2
(North Macedonia) Macedonia	3	0	3	2	6	0

July 8, 2011

Turkey	2–0	Macedonia
Poland	2–0	Cyprus
Turkey	2–1	Poland
Cyprus	2–1	Macedonia

=== Knockout stage ===
Championship bracket

Quarter-finals
July 8
Croatia	2
Serbia	0
July 8
Hungary	1
Ukraine	2
July 8
Russia	2
Norway	0
July 8
Denmark	0
Spain	2

Semi-finals
July 8
Croatia	2
Ukraine	1
July 8
Russia	2
Spain	1

Final
July 9
Croatia	2
Russia	0
Third place
July 9
Ukraine	1
Spain	2

5th place bracket

Semi-finals
July 8
Serbia	1
Hungary	2
July 8
Norway	2
Denmark	1

Fifth place
July 9
Hungary	2
Norway	1
Seventh place
July 9
Serbia	0
Denmark	2

== Women ==
=== Preliminary round ===
Team advanced to Main Round
Team competes in consolation round

==== Group A ====
Team	Pld	W	L	SW	SL	Pts
Croatia	6	5	1	11	2	12
Spain	6	5	1	10	4	12
Italy	6	4	2	9	4	8
Poland	6	3	3	6	6	6
(North Macedonia) Macedonia	6	3	3	7	8	6
Serbia	6	1	5	3	11	2
Switzerland	6	0	6	1	12	0

July 4, 2011

Poland	0–2	Croatia
Spain	2–1	Italy
Serbia	1–2	Macedonia
Croatia	1–2	Macedonia
Italy	2–0	Serbia
Switzerland	0–2	Spain
Poland	2–0	Switzerland

July 5, 2011

Serbia	2–1	Switzerland
Italy	2–0	Poland
Croatia	2–0	Switzerland
Macedonia	0–2	Italy
Spain	2–0	Poland
Poland	2–0	Macedonia
Spain	2–0	Serbia
Serbia	0–2	Croatia
Switzerland	0–2	Italy
Macedonia	1–2	Spain

July 6, 2011

Italy	0–2	Croatia
Poland	2–0	Serbia
Croatia	2–0	Spain
Switzerland	0–2	Macedonia

==== Group B ====
Team	Pld	W	L	SW	SL	Pts
Hungary	6	5	1	11	4	10
Denmark	6	4	2	9	5	8
Norway	6	4	2	10	5	8
Turkey	6	3	3	6	7	6
Ukraine	6	3	3	8	6	6
Cyprus	6	1	5	2	11	2
Greece	6	1	5	3	11	2

July 4, 2011

Hungary	1–2	Norway
Turkey	2–1	Ukraine
Greece	1–2	Cyprus
Norway	1–2	Greece
Ukraine	2–0	Cyprus
Denmark	1–2	Hungary
Turkey	0–2	Denmark

July 5, 2011

Greece	0–2	Denmark
Norway	2–0	Turkey
Ukraine	2–0	Denmark
Cyprus	0–2	Norway
Hungary	2–0	Turkey
Turkey	2–0	Cyprus
Hungary	2–0	Greece
Greece	0–2	Ukraine
Denmark	2–1	Norway
Cyprus	0–2	Hungary

July 6, 2011

Norway	2–0	Ukraine
Turkey	2–0	Greece
Denmark	2–0	Cyprus
Ukraine	1–2	Hungary

=== Main Round ===
==== Group I ====
Team	Pld	W	L	SW	SL	Pts
Denmark	3	3	0	6	2	6
Croatia	3	2	1	5	2	4
Italy	3	1	2	3	4	2
Turkey	3	0	3	0	6	0

July 7, 2011

Turkey	0–2	Croatia
Italy	1–2	Denmark
Italy	2–0	Turkey
Croatia	1–2	Denmark

==== Group II ====
Team	Pld	W	L	SW	SL	Pts
Norway	3	3	0	6	2	6
Hungary	3	2	1	5	3	4
Spain	3	1	2	4	4	2
Poland	3	0	3	0	6	0

July 7, 2011

Poland	0–2	Hungary
Norway	2–1	Spain
Norway	2–0	Poland
Hungary	2–1	Spain

=== Consolation round ===
==== Places 9–14 ====
===== Group III =====
Team	Pld	W	L	SW	SL	Pts
Ukraine	5	5	0	10	0	10
(North Macedonia) Macedonia	5	3	2	7	5	6
Serbia	5	3	2	7	6	6
Cyprus	5	2	3	6	8	4
Switzerland	5	2	3	5	8	4
Greece	5	0	5	2	10	0

July 7, 2011

Macedonia	2–0	Greece
Switzerland	2–1	Cyprus
Serbia	0–2	Ukraine
Cyprus	2–1	Macedonia
Greece	0–2	Serbia
Ukraine	2–0	Switzerland

July 8, 2011

Switzerland	2–1	Greece
Serbia	2–1	Cyprus
Macedonia	0–2	Ukraine

=== Knockout stage ===
Championship bracket

Quarter-finals
July 8
Denmark	2
Poland	0
July 8
Hungary	1
Italy	2
July 8
Croatia	2
Spain	0
July 8
Turkey	0
Norway	2

Semi-finals
July 8
Denmark	2
Italy	0
July 8
Croatia	2
Norway	0

Final
July 9
Denmark	1
Croatia	2
Third place
July 9
Italy	2
Norway	1

5th place bracket

Semi-finals
July 8
Poland	1
Hungary	2
July 8
Spain	2
Turkey	1

Fifth place
July 9
Hungary	2
Spain	1
Seventh place
July 9
Poland	0
Turkey	2
