= Sweden women's national beach handball team =

National women's beach handball team of Sweden

The Sweden women's national beach handball team is the national women's beach handball team of Sweden and is controlled by the Swedish Handball Association. Their best result in the European Championship is from Cádiz 2002, when Sweden finished in 6th place. The team has never participated in the World Championships.

== Results ==
=== European Beach Handball Championship ===
Year	Position	Pld	W	L
(Italy) 2000	Did not enter			
(Spain) 2002	11	7	4	3
(Turkey) 2004	12	10	4	7
(Germany) 2006	Did not enter			
(Italy) 2007	Did not enter			
(Norway) 2009	12	8	2	6
(Croatia) 2011	14	8	1	7
(Denmark) 2013	13	10	0	10
(Spain) 2015	12	11	3	8
(Croatia) 2017	13	8	3	5
(Poland) 2019	Did not enter			
(Bulgaria) 2021	Did not enter			
(Portugal) 2023	Did not enter			
(Turkey) 2025	9	9	3	6
