= Croatia women's national beach handball team =

Croatia

Information
- Association: Croatian Handball Federation
- Coach: Tihana Mikelić
- Assistant coach: Ante Taraš

Colours
Home	Away

Results

World Games
- Appearances: 2 (First in 2005)
- Best result: 2nd (2009)

World Championship
- Appearances: 7 (First in 2004)
- Best result: 1st (2008)
- Last updated on Unknown.

Croatia women's national beach handball team
Medal record

Women's beach handball

Representing Croatia

World Championship
Gold medal – first place	2008 Spain	

European Championship
Gold medal – first place	2007 Italy	
Gold medal – first place	2011 Croatia	
Silver medal – second place	2004 Turkey	
Bronze medal – third place	2006 Germany	
Bronze medal – third place	2009 Norway	

World Games
Silver medal – second place	2009 Taiwan	Team

The Croatia women's national beach handball team is the national team of Croatia. It is governed by the Croatian Handball Federation and takes part in national beach handball competitions. They are World champions of 2008 and two-times European champions (2007 and 2011), as well as silver medalists of the 2009 World Games.

Team finished 5th at the girls' tournament of the 2026 Summer Youth Olympics in Dakar, Senegal.

== Results ==
=== World Championships ===
Year	Position
(Egypt) 2004	4th place
(Brazil) 2006	6th place
(Spain) 2008	1st place
(Turkey) 2010	6th place
(Oman) 2012	5th place
(Brazil) 2014	Did not qualify
(Hungary) 2016	Did not qualify
(Russia) 2018	Did not qualify
(Italy) 2020	Cancelled
(Greece) 2022	Did not qualify
(China) 2024	7th place
(Croatia) 2026	8th place
Total	7/11

=== World Games ===
Year	Position
(Japan) 2001	—
(Germany) 2005	4th place
(Taiwan) 2009	2nd place
(Colombia) 2013	—
(Poland) 2017	—
(United States) 2022	—
(China) 2025	7th place
Total	3/7

=== European Championship ===
Year	Position
(Italy) 2000	Did not qualify
(Spain) 2002	Did not qualify
(Turkey) 2004	2nd place
(Germany) 2006	3rd place
(Italy) 2007	1st place
(Norway) 2009	3rd place
(Croatia) 2011	1st place
(Denmark) 2013	9th place
(Spain) 2015	9th place
(Croatia) 2017	9th place
(Poland) 2019	4th place
(Bulgaria) 2021	11th place
(Portugal) 2023	8th place
(Turkey) 2025	13th place
Total	12/14

== Medalist teams ==
- 2008 World Championships (champions):

Filipa Ačkar, Marina Bazzeo, Snježana Botica, Dubravka Bukovina, Anja Daskijević, Ivana Lovrić, Maja Majer, Petra Starček, Vlatka Šamarinec, Željka Vidović.
Coach: Matea Brezić

== Awards ==
- Topscorer of the tournament: Željka Vidović (2006 WC)

Abbreviations: WC − World Championship

== See also ==
- Croatia national beach handball team
