= Ukraine women's national beach handball team =

Ukraine

Information
- Association: Ukraine Handball Federation

Colours
Home	Away

Results

World Championship
- Appearances: 3 (First in 2008)
- Best result: 4th (2010, 2014)
- Last updated on Unknown.

Ukraine women's national beach handball team
Medal record

World Games
Gold medal – first place	2001 Akita	

European Championship
Gold medal – first place	2000 Gaeta	

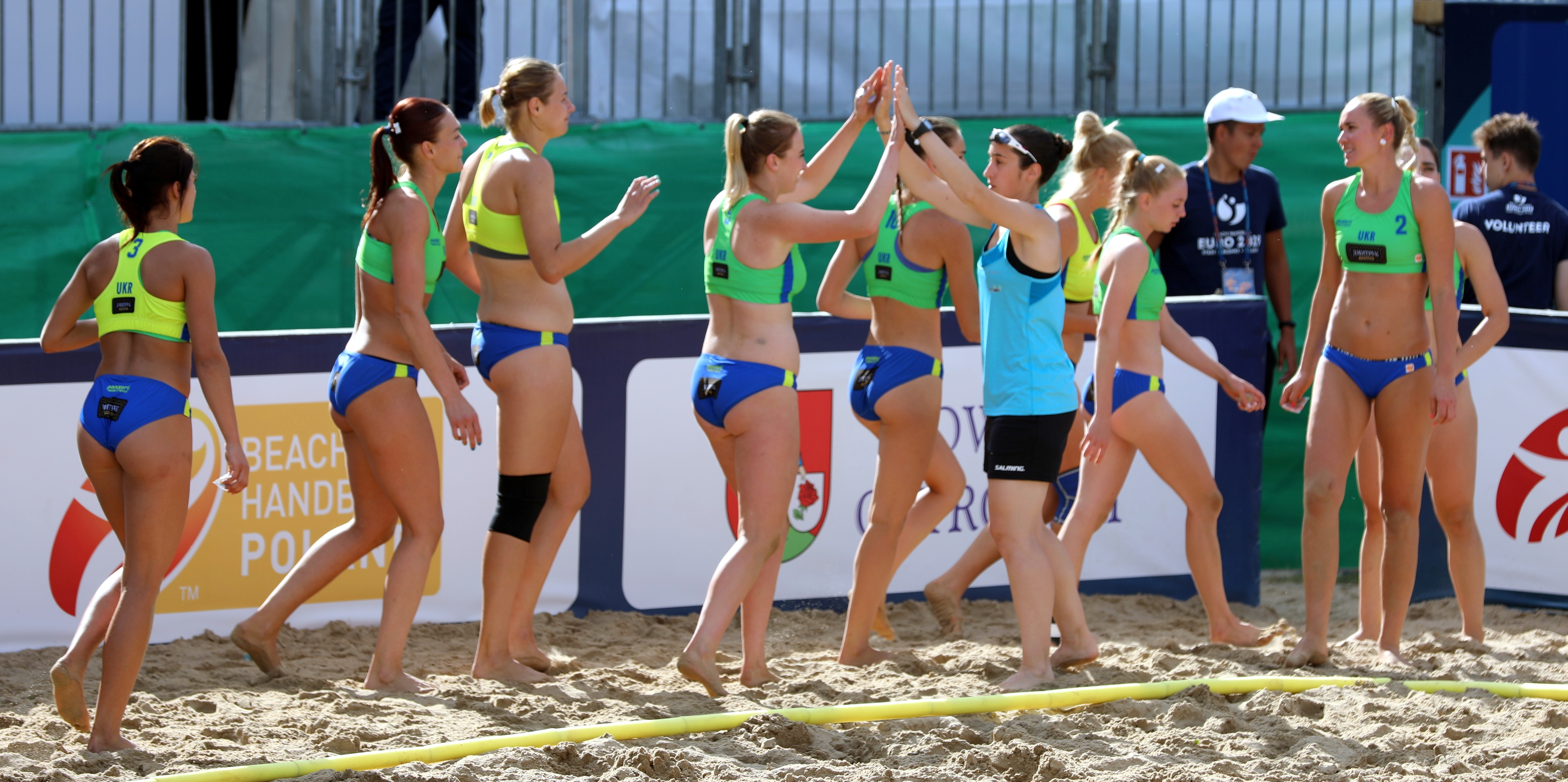
Ukrainian team meeting Croatia in the quarterfinals of the 2019 European Championships

The Ukraine women's national beach handball team is the national team of Ukraine. It is governed by the Ukraine Handball Federation and takes part in international beach handball competitions.

== World Championships results ==
- 2008 – 9th place
- 2010 – 4th place
- 2014 – 4th place

== World Games results ==
- 2001 – 1st place
- 2009 – 6th place

== European Championships results ==
- 2000 – Gold medal
- 2002 – 5th place
- 2004 – 10th place
- 2006 – 9th place
- 2007 – 8th place
- 2009 – 4th place
- 2011 – 9th place
- 2013 – 4th place
- 2015 – 8th place
- 2017 – 18th place
- 2019 – 8th place
- 2021 – 14th place
- 2023 – 10th place
- 2025 – 12th place
