= Serbia women's national beach handball team =

Serbia

Information
- Association: Serbian Handball Federation

Colours
Home	Away

Results

World Championship
- Appearances: 1 (First in 2008)
- Best result: 8th (2008)
- Last updated on Unknown.

Serbia women's national beach handball team
Medal record

Women's beach handball

Representing Serbia

European Championship
Bronze medal – third place	2002 Spain	

The Serbia women's national beach handball team represents Serbia in international women's beach handball. It is governed by the Serbian Handball Federation.

== Results ==
=== World Championships ===
- 2008 – 8th place

=== European Championships ===
- 2007 – 9th place
- 2011 – 10th place
- 2015 – 11th place

== See also ==
- Serbia national beach handball team
