= Beach handball at the 2025 World Games =

- Venue: Xinglong Lake
- Dates: 7–12 August 2025
- No. of events: 2

The beach handball competition at the 2025 World Games took place from 7 to 12 August 2025 at the Xinglong Lake in Chengdu, China.

== Qualification ==
A total of sixteen teams (eight per gender) qualified for the tournaments.

Event	Location	Dates	Total places	Qualified NOCs
Men's – 8 teams
Host nation	—N/a	—N/a	1	China
2024 Men's Beach Handball World Championships	(China) Pingtan	18–23 June 2024	7	Croatia; Denmark; Portugal; Germany; Brazil; Spain; Tunisia
Women's – 8 teams
Host nation	—N/a	—N/a	1	China
2024 Women's Beach Handball World Championships	(China) Pingtan	18–23 June 2024	7	Germany; Argentina; Netherlands; Denmark; Vietnam; Spain; Portugal

== Medalists ==
Event	Gold	Silver	Bronze
Men's tournament	Germany; Lennart Wormann; Lennart Liebeck; Lars Zelser; Timo Gunther; Jannis Herr; Tobias Zeyen; Severin Henrich; Hendrik Prahst; Robin John; Moritz Ebert	Portugal; Rodrigo Gomes; Rui Rodrigues; Simão Santos; Tiago Costa; Francisco Santos; José Silva; José Rebelo; Miguel Ribeiro; Diogo Ferreira; Ricardo Castro	Brazil; Cristiano Rossa; Pedro da Silva; Renan Carvalho; André de Oliveira; Nailson Amaral; Bruno Oliveira; Rai Gonçalves; Hugo Fernandes; Marcelo Tuller; Gustavo Morais
Women's tournament	Argentina; Giuliana Gamba; Lucila Balsas; Fiorella Corimberto; Alma Molina; Zoe Turnes; Agostina Arcajo; Constanza Suárez; Gisella Bonomi; Florencia Gallo; Luciana Scordamaglia	Germany; Kirsten Walter; Belen Gettwart; Emma Pilz; Isabel Kattner; Julia Drachsler; Lena Klinger; Pauline Borrmann; Nele Kurzke; Lucie Kretzschmar; Amelie Mollmann	Spain; María Batista; Mireia Torras; María Trujillo; Patricia Encinas; Alba Díaz; Miriam Sempere; Violeta González; Jimena Laguna; Mariam González; Gemma Sánchez

== Men's tournament ==
=== Group A ===
Pos	Team	Pld	W	L	SW	SL	Pts
1	Brazil	3	3	0	6	2	6
2	Portugal	3	2	1	5	3	4
3	Germany	3	1	2	4	5	2
4	Croatia	3	0	3	1	6	0

Team 1	Score	Team 2
7 August 2025
10:50
Germany	2:1	Croatia
Portugal	1:2	Brazil
8 August 2025
18:00
Brazil	2:0	Croatia
Germany	1:2	Portugal
9 August 2025
16:20
Croatia	0:2	Portugal
Germany	1:2	Brazil

=== Group B ===
Pos	Team	Pld	W	L	SW	SL	Pts
1	Spain	3	3	0	6	1	6
2	Denmark	3	2	1	5	2	4
3	Tunisia	3	1	2	2	4	2
4	China	3	0	3	0	6	0

Team 1	Score	Team 2
7 August 2025
12:30
China	0:2 (14-16,12-13)	Tunisia
Denmark	1:2	Spain
8 August 2025
16:20
Spain	2:0	China
Tunisia	0:2	Denmark
9 August 2025
18:00
Denmark	2:0	China
Spain	2:0	Tunisia

=== Knockout stage ===
Quarter-finals
10 August
Spain	2
Croatia	0
10 August
Portugal	2
Tunisia	1
10 August
Brazil	2
China	0
10 August
Denmark	1
Germany	2

Semi-finals
11 August
Spain	1
Portugal	2
11 August
Brazil	1
Germany	2

Gold medal
12 August
Portugal	1
Germany	2
Bronze medal
12 August
Spain	1
Brazil	2

Source: IHF Tournament Summary, IHF Statistics

== Women's tournament ==
=== Group A ===
Pos	Team	Pld	W	L	SW	SL	Pts
1	Germany	3	3	0	6	0	6
2	Spain	3	2	1	4	3	4
3	Denmark	3	1	2	2	4	2
4	Vietnam	3	0	3	1	6	0

Team 1	Score	Team 2
7 August 2025
11:40
Germany	2:0	Spain
Denmark	2:0	Vietnam
8 August 2025
15:30
Vietnam	0:2	Germany
Spain	2:0	Denmark
9 August 2025
17:10
Germany	2:0	Denmark
Spain	2:1	Vietnam

=== Group B ===
Pos	Team	Pld	W	L	SW	SL	Pts
1	Argentina	3	3	0	6	0	6
2	Croatia	3	1	2	3	4	2
3	Portugal	3	1	2	2	4	2
4	China	3	1	2	2	5	2

Team 1	Score	Team 2
7 August 2025
10:00
China	2:1	Croatia
Argentina	2:0	Portugal
8 August 2025
17:10
Portugal	2:0	China
Croatia	0:2	Argentina
9 August 2025
15:30
Argentina	2:0	China
Portugal	0:2	Croatia

=== Knockout stage ===
Quarter-finals
10 August
Argentina	2
Vietnam	0
10 August
Spain	2
Portugal	0
10 August
Germany	2
China	0
10 August
Croatia	0
Denmark	2

Semi-finals
11 August
Argentina	2
Spain	1
11 August
Germany	2
Denmark	0

Gold medal
12 August
Argentina	2
Germany	1
Bronze medal
12 August
Spain	2
Denmark	0

Source: IHF Tournament Summary, IHF Statistics
