= Ukraine men's national beach handball team =

Ukraine

Information
- Association: Ukrainian Handball Federation

Colours
Home	Away

Results

World Championship
- Appearances: 3 (First in 2004)
- Best result: 2nd (2012)
- Last updated on Unknown.

Ukraine men's national beach handball team
Medal record

World Championship
Silver medal – second place	2012 Muscat	

European Championship
Bronze medal – third place	2000 Gaeta	
Bronze medal – third place	2015 Lloret de Mar	

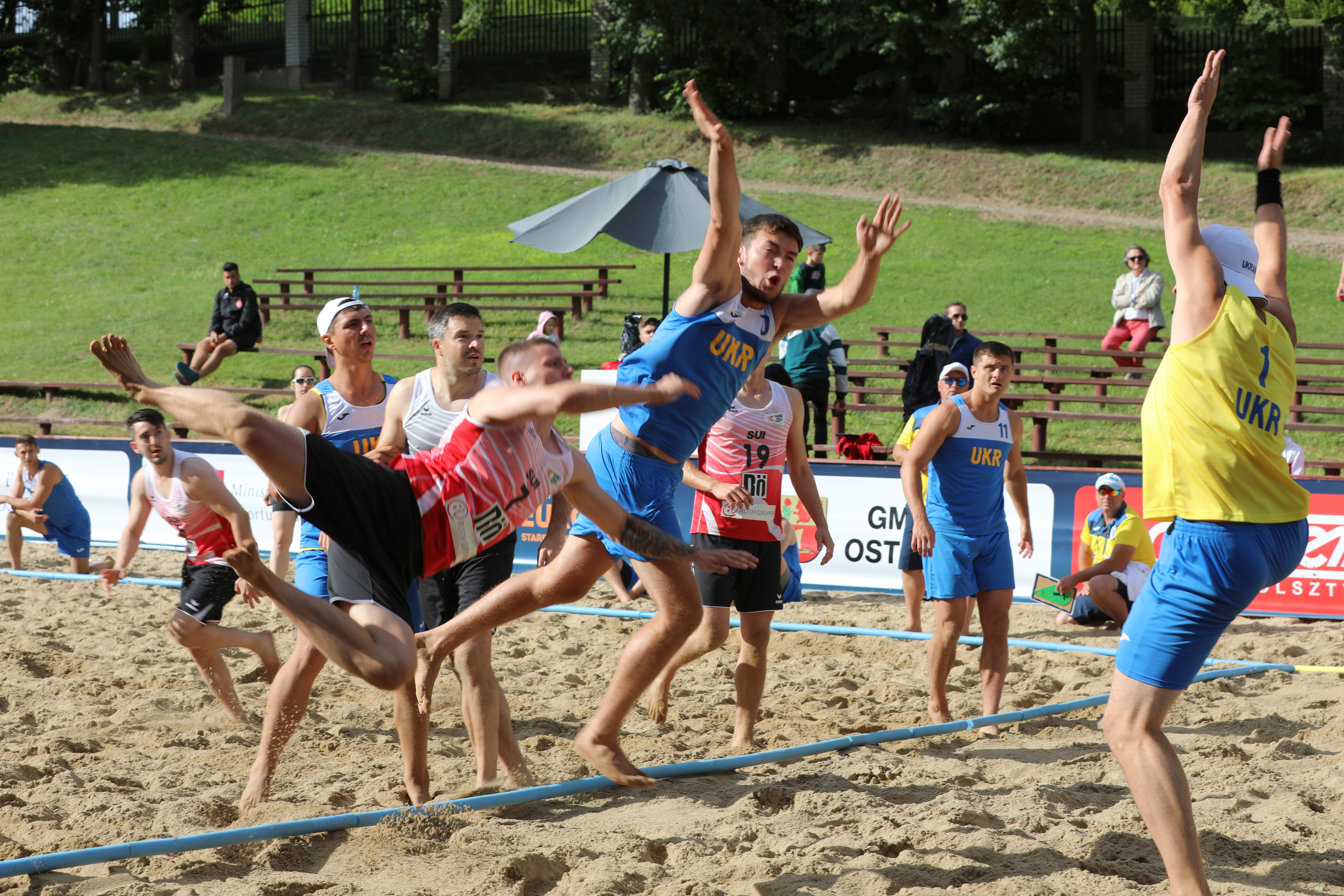
Ukrainian team meeting Switzerland in the preliminary round of the 2019 European Championships

The Ukraine national beach handball team is the national team of Ukraine. It is governed by the Ukrainian Handball Federation and takes part in international beach handball competitions.

== World Championships results ==
- 2004 – 5th place
- 2012 – 2nd place
- 2016 – 6th place

== World Games results ==
- 2013 – 5th place

== European Championships results ==
- 2000 – Bronze medal
- 2002 – 4th place
- 2004 – 5th place
- 2006 – 8th place
- 2007 – 6th place
- 2009 – 9th place
- 2011 – 4th place
- 2013 – 6th place
- 2015 – Bronze medal
- 2017 – 6th place
- 2019 – 12th place
- 2021 – 14th place
- 2023 – 8th place
- 2025 – 15th place
