= 2023 European Beach Handball Championship =

International sports event

- Dates: 24–28 May
- Host city: Nazaré, Portugal
- Events: 2

The 2023 European Beach Handball Championship was held in Nazaré, Portugal from 24 to 28 May 2023. All results, schedules and news regarding the EHF Beach Handball EURO can be found at site.

== Format ==
The men's and women's competition begins in the preliminary round with sixteen teams, divided into four groups. The top two teams from each group advance to the Main Round where they are divided into two groups of four, while the third and fourth teams are sent to the Consolation Round in two groups of four. Four teams in two groups of the main round play 1st and 4th, 2nd and 3rd and advance to the quarterfinals, semifinals and finals. Teams eliminated in the main round continue to play against teams from the consolation round. The groups in the preliminary round play a round-robin, while in the main round they only play against teams they have not played before, since the results of the preliminary round carry forward into the main round only in team matches who passed on

== Men's Tournament ==
=== Preliminary round ===
Team advance to Main round
Team advance to Consolation round

==== Group A ====
Pos	Team	Pld	W	L	SW	SL	SD	GPF	GPA	GPD	Pts
1	Norway	3	2	1	5	3	+2	156	141	+15	4
2	Croatia	3	2	1	4	3	+1	129	117	+12	4
3	Netherlands	3	2	1	4	4	0	134	150	−16	4
4	Poland	3	0	3	3	6	−3	136	147	−11	0

24 May 2023; 12:00	Croatia	2–1	Poland	Court 2, Nazaré; Attendance: 250; Referees: Constantin, Enache (ROU)
24 May 2023; 12:00	Hranjec 16	(18–14, 14–16, 11–10)	Koper 22	Court 2, Nazaré; Attendance: 250; Referees: Constantin, Enache (ROU)
24 May 2023; 12:00	4× 1× (red card)	Report	3× 1× (red card)	Court 2, Nazaré; Attendance: 250; Referees: Constantin, Enache (ROU)

24 May 2023; 12:00	Norway	1–2	Netherlands	Court 3, Nazaré; Attendance: 150; Referees: Bareš, Uhlíř (CZE)
24 May 2023; 12:00	Daviknes 22	(20–18, 26–28, 8–9)	Robben 22	Court 3, Nazaré; Attendance: 150; Referees: Bareš, Uhlíř (CZE)
24 May 2023; 12:00	1×	Report		Court 3, Nazaré; Attendance: 150; Referees: Bareš, Uhlíř (CZE)

24 May 2023; 16:00	Netherlands	0–2	Croatia	Court 3, Nazaré; Attendance: 100; Referees: Deiters, Stumpfe (GER)
24 May 2023; 16:00	Robben 18	(18–23, 14–23)	Valentaković 16	Court 3, Nazaré; Attendance: 100; Referees: Deiters, Stumpfe (GER)
24 May 2023; 16:00	2×	Report		Court 3, Nazaré; Attendance: 100; Referees: Deiters, Stumpfe (GER)

24 May 2023; 16:00	Poland	1–2	Norway	Court 4, Nazaré; Attendance: 104; Referees: Barbosa, Lemos (POR)
24 May 2023; 16:00	Wojdak 14	(14–24, 26–24, 6–9)	Daviknes 17	Court 4, Nazaré; Attendance: 104; Referees: Barbosa, Lemos (POR)
24 May 2023; 16:00	1×	Report	3× 1× (red card)	Court 4, Nazaré; Attendance: 104; Referees: Barbosa, Lemos (POR)

25 May 2023; 10:00	Croatia	0–2	Norway	Court 3, Nazaré; Attendance: 95; Referees: Deding Søe, Haar Visholm (DEN)
25 May 2023; 10:00	Hranjec 12	(18–20, 22–25)	Daviknes 19	Court 3, Nazaré; Attendance: 95; Referees: Deding Søe, Haar Visholm (DEN)
25 May 2023; 10:00		Report	2×	Court 3, Nazaré; Attendance: 95; Referees: Deding Søe, Haar Visholm (DEN)

25 May 2023; 10:00	Poland	1–2	Netherlands	Court 4, Nazaré; Attendance: 50; Referees: Buchón-Perea, Del Valle-Encuentra (ESP)
25 May 2023; 10:00	Wojdak 20	(28–18, 14–20, 8–9)	Schaap 16	Court 4, Nazaré; Attendance: 50; Referees: Buchón-Perea, Del Valle-Encuentra (ESP)
25 May 2023; 10:00	1×	Report	1×	Court 4, Nazaré; Attendance: 50; Referees: Buchón-Perea, Del Valle-Encuentra (ESP)

==== Group B ====
Pos	Team	Pld	W	L	SW	SL	SD	GPF	GPA	GPD	Pts
1	Portugal	3	2	1	5	2	+3	136	107	+29	4
2	Hungary	3	2	1	4	2	+2	137	119	+18	4
3	France	3	2	1	4	4	0	125	147	−22	4
4	Italy	3	0	3	1	6	−5	114	139	−25	0

24 May 2023; 12:00	Hungary	0–2	Portugal	Court 1, Nazaré; Attendance: 300; Referees: Deiters, Stumpfe (GER)
24 May 2023; 12:00	John 12	(16–19, 19–22)	Ferreira 17	Court 1, Nazaré; Attendance: 300; Referees: Deiters, Stumpfe (GER)
24 May 2023; 12:00	2× 1× (red card)	Report	2×	Court 1, Nazaré; Attendance: 300; Referees: Deiters, Stumpfe (GER)

24 May 2023; 12:00	France	2–1	Italy	Court 4, Nazaré; Attendance: 120; Referees: Fabryczny, Rawicki (POL)
24 May 2023; 12:00	Yamdjeu 20	(16–20, 20–19, 8–6)	Dieguez, Mitterrutzner 12	Court 4, Nazaré; Attendance: 120; Referees: Fabryczny, Rawicki (POL)
24 May 2023; 12:00		Report	2× 1× (red card)	Court 4, Nazaré; Attendance: 120; Referees: Fabryczny, Rawicki (POL)

24 May 2023; 16:00	Portugal	1–2	France	Court 1, Nazaré; Attendance: 200; Referees: Weijmans, Wolbertus (NED)
24 May 2023; 16:00	Paulo 17	(25–16, 17–18, 6–9)	Yamdjeu 20	Court 1, Nazaré; Attendance: 200; Referees: Weijmans, Wolbertus (NED)
24 May 2023; 16:00		Report		Court 1, Nazaré; Attendance: 200; Referees: Weijmans, Wolbertus (NED)

24 May 2023; 16:00	Italy	0–2	Hungary	Court 2, Nazaré; Attendance: 120; Referees: Deding Søe, Haar Visholm (DEN)
24 May 2023; 16:00	Dieguez 10	(18–20, 22–28)	Vizes 16	Court 2, Nazaré; Attendance: 120; Referees: Deding Søe, Haar Visholm (DEN)
24 May 2023; 16:00	2×	Report	4× 1× (red card)	Court 2, Nazaré; Attendance: 120; Referees: Deding Søe, Haar Visholm (DEN)

25 May 2023; 10:00	Portugal	2–0	Italy	Court 1, Nazaré; Attendance: 100; Referees: Constantin, Enache (ROU)
25 May 2023; 10:00	Ferreira 13	(30–15, 17–14)	Dieguez 8	Court 1, Nazaré; Attendance: 100; Referees: Constantin, Enache (ROU)
25 May 2023; 10:00	1×	Report		Court 1, Nazaré; Attendance: 100; Referees: Constantin, Enache (ROU)

25 May 2023; 10:00	Hungary	2–0	France	Court 2, Nazaré; Attendance: 60; Referees: Deiters, Stumpfe (GER)
25 May 2023; 10:00	Gyene 18	(27–18, 27–20)	Yamdjeu 18	Court 2, Nazaré; Attendance: 60; Referees: Deiters, Stumpfe (GER)
25 May 2023; 10:00	1×	Report	3×	Court 2, Nazaré; Attendance: 60; Referees: Deiters, Stumpfe (GER)

==== Group C ====
Pos	Team	Pld	W	L	SW	SL	SD	GPF	GPA	GPD	Pts
1	Spain	3	3	0	6	1	+5	142	114	+28	6
2	Ukraine	3	2	1	4	3	+1	119	135	−16	4
3	Sweden	3	1	2	3	5	−2	150	144	+6	2
4	Greece	3	0	3	2	6	−4	135	153	−18	0

24 May 2023; 13:00	Ukraine	2–0	Greece	Court 1, Nazaré; Attendance: 150; Referees: Lacković, Višnjić (CRO)
24 May 2023; 13:00	Kopyshynskyi 16	(22–20, 25–24)	Ladakis 16	Court 1, Nazaré; Attendance: 150; Referees: Lacković, Višnjić (CRO)
24 May 2023; 13:00	5× 2× (red card)	Report	5×	Court 1, Nazaré; Attendance: 150; Referees: Lacković, Višnjić (CRO)

24 May 2023; 13:00	Spain	2–0	Sweden	Court 3, Nazaré; Attendance: 70; Referees: Barbosa, Lemos (POR)
24 May 2023; 13:00	Venegas 24	(32–30, 19–14)	Paldanius 22	Court 3, Nazaré; Attendance: 70; Referees: Barbosa, Lemos (POR)
24 May 2023; 13:00	3×	Report	2× 1× (red card)	Court 3, Nazaré; Attendance: 70; Referees: Barbosa, Lemos (POR)

24 May 2023; 17:00	Greece	1–2	Spain	Court 1, Nazaré; Attendance: 300; Referees: Pipitone, Sardisco (ITA)
24 May 2023; 17:00	Karagiozopoulos 14	(27–18, 15–25, 4–7)	Luís 25	Court 1, Nazaré; Attendance: 300; Referees: Pipitone, Sardisco (ITA)
24 May 2023; 17:00		Report	1×	Court 1, Nazaré; Attendance: 300; Referees: Pipitone, Sardisco (ITA)

24 May 2023; 17:00	Sweden	1–2	Ukraine	Court 3, Nazaré; Attendance: 200; Referees: Constantin, Enache (ROU)
24 May 2023; 17:00	Paldanius 20	(24–18, 16–19, 10–11)	Kopyshynskyi 21	Court 3, Nazaré; Attendance: 200; Referees: Constantin, Enache (ROU)
24 May 2023; 17:00	2× 1× (red card)	Report	2×	Court 3, Nazaré; Attendance: 200; Referees: Constantin, Enache (ROU)

25 May 2023; 11:00	Sweden	2–1	Greece	Court 1, Nazaré; Attendance: 120; Referees: Bareš, Uhlíř (CZE)
25 May 2023; 11:00	Paldanius 18	(26–15, 24–25, 6–5)	Ladakis 19	Court 1, Nazaré; Attendance: 120; Referees: Bareš, Uhlíř (CZE)
25 May 2023; 11:00	1×	Report	1×	Court 1, Nazaré; Attendance: 120; Referees: Bareš, Uhlíř (CZE)

25 May 2023; 11:00	Spain	2–0	Ukraine	Court 3, Nazaré; Attendance: 60; Referees: Fabryczny, Rawicki (POL)
25 May 2023; 11:00	Luís 10	(18–14, 23–10)	Kozakevych 8	Court 3, Nazaré; Attendance: 60; Referees: Fabryczny, Rawicki (POL)
25 May 2023; 11:00	2×	Report	1×	Court 3, Nazaré; Attendance: 60; Referees: Fabryczny, Rawicki (POL)

==== Group D ====
Pos	Team	Pld	W	L	SW	SL	SD	GPF	GPA	GPD	Pts
1	Denmark	3	3	0	6	1	+5	139	90	+49	6
2	Germany	3	2	1	5	2	+3	138	101	+37	4
3	Romania	3	1	2	2	4	−2	87	112	−25	2
4	Switzerland	3	0	3	0	6	−6	92	153	−61	0

24 May 2023; 13:00	Denmark	2–0	Romania	Court 2, Nazaré; Attendance: 51; Referees: Pipitone, Sardisco (ITA)
24 May 2023; 13:00	Andersen 12	(17–12, 26–6)	Belchite, Ghivil 6	Court 2, Nazaré; Attendance: 51; Referees: Pipitone, Sardisco (ITA)
24 May 2023; 13:00		Report	2×	Court 2, Nazaré; Attendance: 51; Referees: Pipitone, Sardisco (ITA)

24 May 2023; 13:00	Germany	2–0	Switzerland	Court 4, Nazaré; Attendance: 100; Referees: Buchón-Perea, Del Valle-Encuentra (ESP)
24 May 2023; 13:00	Mollath 18	(32–19, 26–12)	Kündig 11	Court 4, Nazaré; Attendance: 100; Referees: Buchón-Perea, Del Valle-Encuentra (ESP)
24 May 2023; 13:00		Report	1×	Court 4, Nazaré; Attendance: 100; Referees: Buchón-Perea, Del Valle-Encuentra (ESP)

24 May 2023; 17:00	Switzerland	0–2	Denmark	Court 2, Nazaré; Attendance: 70; Referees: Bareš, Uhlíř (CZE)
24 May 2023; 17:00	Von der Weid 14	(21–28, 10–26)	Moss 24	Court 2, Nazaré; Attendance: 70; Referees: Bareš, Uhlíř (CZE)
24 May 2023; 17:00	1×	Report		Court 2, Nazaré; Attendance: 70; Referees: Bareš, Uhlíř (CZE)

24 May 2023; 17:00	Romania	0–2	Germany	Court 4, Nazaré; Attendance: 100; Referees: Lacković, Višnjić (CRO)
24 May 2023; 17:00	Belchite 10	(12–18, 16–21)	Zelser 12	Court 4, Nazaré; Attendance: 100; Referees: Lacković, Višnjić (CRO)
24 May 2023; 17:00	1×	Report	1×	Court 4, Nazaré; Attendance: 100; Referees: Lacković, Višnjić (CRO)

25 May 2023; 11:00	Denmark	2–1	Germany	Court 2, Nazaré; Attendance: 150; Referees: Barbosa, Lemos (POR)
25 May 2023; 11:00	Andersen 15	(19–16, 16–19, 7–6)	Mollath 10	Court 2, Nazaré; Attendance: 150; Referees: Barbosa, Lemos (POR)
25 May 2023; 11:00	3× 1× (red card)	Report	4× 1× (red card)	Court 2, Nazaré; Attendance: 150; Referees: Barbosa, Lemos (POR)

25 May 2023; 11:00	Romania	2–0	Switzerland	Court 4, Nazaré; Attendance: 50; Referees: Weijmans, Wolbertus (NED)
25 May 2023; 11:00	Ghivil 18	(24–16, 17–14)	Naprstek 8	Court 4, Nazaré; Attendance: 50; Referees: Weijmans, Wolbertus (NED)
25 May 2023; 11:00	1×	Report		Court 4, Nazaré; Attendance: 50; Referees: Weijmans, Wolbertus (NED)

=== Consolidation round ===
Team advance to Cross matches 9-12
Team advance to Cross matches 13-16

==== Group I ====
Pos	Team	Pld	W	L	SW	SL	SD	GPF	GPA	GPD	Pts
1	Poland	3	2	1	5	3	+2	137	136	+1	4
2	Greece	3	2	1	5	2	+3	144	134	+10	4
3	France	3	1	2	2	4	−2	141	133	+8	2
4	Romania	3	1	2	2	5	−3	114	133	−19	2

25 May 2023; 15:00	France	0–2	Poland	Court 3, Nazaré; Attendance: 83; Referees: Lacković, Višnjić (CRO)
25 May 2023; 15:00	Desbonnet, Quintin 10	(22–25, 20–22)	Koper 18	Court 3, Nazaré; Attendance: 83; Referees: Lacković, Višnjić (CRO)
25 May 2023; 15:00		Report	2×	Court 3, Nazaré; Attendance: 83; Referees: Lacković, Višnjić (CRO)

25 May 2023; 15:00	Romania	0–2	Greece	Court 4, Nazaré; Attendance: 50; Referees: Pipitone, Sardisco (ITA)
25 May 2023; 15:00	Ghivil 14	(18–19, 20–21)	Eleftheriadis 16	Court 4, Nazaré; Attendance: 50; Referees: Pipitone, Sardisco (ITA)
25 May 2023; 15:00		Report	1×	Court 4, Nazaré; Attendance: 50; Referees: Pipitone, Sardisco (ITA)

26 May 2023; 13:00	Poland	2–1	Greece	Court 3, Nazaré; Attendance: 30; Referees: Barbosa, Lemos (POR)
26 May 2023; 13:00	Wojdak 18	(21–20, 20–26, 8–6)	Karagiozopoulos, Tsanaxidis 14	Court 3, Nazaré; Attendance: 30; Referees: Barbosa, Lemos (POR)
26 May 2023; 13:00	1×	Report	1×	Court 3, Nazaré; Attendance: 30; Referees: Barbosa, Lemos (POR)

26 May 2023; 13:00	Romania	0–2	France	Court 4, Nazaré; Attendance: 100; Referees: Deding Søe, Haar Visholm (DEN)
26 May 2023; 13:00	Hauler, Morosanu 10	(16–26, 18–26)	Desbonnet, Yamdjeu 16	Court 4, Nazaré; Attendance: 100; Referees: Deding Søe, Haar Visholm (DEN)
26 May 2023; 13:00	1×	Report		Court 4, Nazaré; Attendance: 100; Referees: Deding Søe, Haar Visholm (DEN)

26 May 2023; 17:00	Greece	2–0	France	Court 3, Nazaré; Attendance: 100; Referees: Bareš, Uhlíř (CZE)
26 May 2023; 17:00	Eleftheriadis 19	(20–16, 32–31)	Desbonnet 14	Court 3, Nazaré; Attendance: 100; Referees: Bareš, Uhlíř (CZE)
26 May 2023; 17:00	1×	Report	3×	Court 3, Nazaré; Attendance: 100; Referees: Bareš, Uhlíř (CZE)

26 May 2023; 17:00	Poland	1–2	Romania	Court 4, Nazaré; Attendance: 70; Referees: Pipitone, Sardisco (ITA)
26 May 2023; 17:00	Ponto 11	(18–19, 17–16, 6–7)	Hauler 12	Court 4, Nazaré; Attendance: 70; Referees: Pipitone, Sardisco (ITA)
26 May 2023; 17:00	2×	Report	1×	Court 4, Nazaré; Attendance: 70; Referees: Pipitone, Sardisco (ITA)

==== Group II ====
Pos	Team	Pld	W	L	SW	SL	SD	GPF	GPA	GPD	Pts
1	Italy	3	3	0	6	2	+4	157	138	+19	6
2	Sweden	3	2	1	5	2	+3	147	117	+30	4
3	Netherlands	3	1	2	2	4	−2	110	120	−10	2
4	Switzerland	3	0	3	1	6	−5	108	147	−39	0

25 May 2023; 14:00	Netherlands	0–2	Italy	Court 3, Nazaré; Attendance: 60; Referees: Bareš, Uhlíř (CZE)
25 May 2023; 14:00	Baijens 16	(20–23, 20–24)	Dieguez 16	Court 3, Nazaré; Attendance: 60; Referees: Bareš, Uhlíř (CZE)
25 May 2023; 14:00	1×	Report	3× 1× (red card)	Court 3, Nazaré; Attendance: 60; Referees: Bareš, Uhlíř (CZE)

25 May 2023; 14:00	Sweden	2–0	Switzerland	Court 4, Nazaré; Attendance: 42; Referees: Constantin, Enache (ROU)
25 May 2023; 14:00	Paldanius 20	(28–15, 21–20)	Schnyder 15	Court 4, Nazaré; Attendance: 42; Referees: Constantin, Enache (ROU)
25 May 2023; 14:00	1×	Report	2× 1× (red card)	Court 4, Nazaré; Attendance: 42; Referees: Constantin, Enache (ROU)

26 May 2023; 12:00	Sweden	2–0	Netherlands	Court 3, Nazaré; Attendance: 200; Referees: Buchón-Perea, Del Valle-Encuentra (ESP)
26 May 2023; 12:00	Johansson 12	(20–14, 24–14)	Baijens 12	Court 3, Nazaré; Attendance: 200; Referees: Buchón-Perea, Del Valle-Encuentra (ESP)
26 May 2023; 12:00	1×	Report		Court 3, Nazaré; Attendance: 200; Referees: Buchón-Perea, Del Valle-Encuentra (ESP)

26 May 2023; 12:00	Italy	2–1	Switzerland	Court 4, Nazaré; Attendance: 55; Referees: Deiters, Stumpfe (GER)
26 May 2023; 12:00	Degiorgio 21	(31–20, 18–20, 7–4)	Kündig 14	Court 4, Nazaré; Attendance: 55; Referees: Deiters, Stumpfe (GER)
26 May 2023; 12:00	1×	Report		Court 4, Nazaré; Attendance: 55; Referees: Deiters, Stumpfe (GER)

26 May 2023; 16:00	Switzerland	0–2	Netherlands	Court 3, Nazaré; Attendance: 150; Referees: Lacković, Višnjić (CRO)
26 May 2023; 16:00	Kündig 12	(12–18, 17–24)	Robben 18	Court 3, Nazaré; Attendance: 150; Referees: Lacković, Višnjić (CRO)
26 May 2023; 16:00		Report	1×	Court 3, Nazaré; Attendance: 150; Referees: Lacković, Višnjić (CRO)

26 May 2023; 16:00	Italy	2–1	Sweden	Court 4, Nazaré; Attendance: 70; Referees: Constantin, Enache (ROU)
26 May 2023; 16:00	Dieguez 15	(20–25, 25–23, 9–6)	Johansson 14	Court 4, Nazaré; Attendance: 70; Referees: Constantin, Enache (ROU)
26 May 2023; 16:00	1×	Report	1×	Court 4, Nazaré; Attendance: 70; Referees: Constantin, Enache (ROU)

=== Main round ===
Team advance to Quarterfinals

==== Group I ====
Pos	Team	Pld	W	L	SW	SL	SD	GPF	GPA	GPD	Pts
1	Hungary	3	2	1	5	2	+3	128	125	+3	4
2	Germany	3	2	1	4	4	0	142	147	−5	4
3	Spain	3	1	2	3	4	−1	143	140	+3	2
4	Norway	3	1	2	3	5	−2	148	149	−1	2

25 May 2023; 15:00	Norway	2–1	Hungary	Court 1, Nazaré; Attendance: 85; Referees: Barbosa, Lemos (POR)
25 May 2023; 15:00	Daviknes 13	(20–22, 19–18, 6–4)	Kun 18	Court 1, Nazaré; Attendance: 85; Referees: Barbosa, Lemos (POR)
25 May 2023; 15:00	1×	Report	3× 1× (red card)	Court 1, Nazaré; Attendance: 85; Referees: Barbosa, Lemos (POR)

25 May 2023; 15:00	Spain	1–2	Germany	Court 2, Nazaré; Attendance: 190; Referees: Deding Søe, Haar Visholm (DEN)
25 May 2023; 15:00	Luís 14	(24–20, 22–24, 4–6)	Liebeck, Mollath 12	Court 2, Nazaré; Attendance: 190; Referees: Deding Søe, Haar Visholm (DEN)
25 May 2023; 15:00	4× 1× (red card)	Report	3× 1× (red card)	Court 2, Nazaré; Attendance: 190; Referees: Deding Søe, Haar Visholm (DEN)

26 May 2023; 13:00	Hungary	2–0	Germany	Court 1, Nazaré; Attendance: 150; Referees: Lacković, Višnjić (CRO)
26 May 2023; 13:00	Csuka 11	(21–20, 21–20)	Mollath 12	Court 1, Nazaré; Attendance: 150; Referees: Lacković, Višnjić (CRO)
26 May 2023; 13:00	1×	Report	1×	Court 1, Nazaré; Attendance: 150; Referees: Lacković, Višnjić (CRO)

26 May 2023; 13:00	Norway	0–2	Spain	Court 2, Nazaré; Attendance: 100; Referees: Pipitone, Sardisco (ITA)
26 May 2023; 13:00	Henriksen 20	(26–30, 22–23)	Luís 18	Court 2, Nazaré; Attendance: 100; Referees: Pipitone, Sardisco (ITA)
26 May 2023; 13:00	3×	Report	2×	Court 2, Nazaré; Attendance: 100; Referees: Pipitone, Sardisco (ITA)

26 May 2023; 17:00	Germany	2–1	Norway	Court 1, Nazaré; Attendance: 500; Referees: Deding Søe, Haar Visholm (DEN)
26 May 2023; 17:00	Friedel 13	(32–30, 13–19, 7–6)	Henriksen 28	Court 1, Nazaré; Attendance: 500; Referees: Deding Søe, Haar Visholm (DEN)
26 May 2023; 17:00	1×	Report	1×	Court 1, Nazaré; Attendance: 500; Referees: Deding Søe, Haar Visholm (DEN)

26 May 2023; 17:00	Hungary	2–0	Spain	Court 2, Nazaré; Attendance: 150; Referees: Weijmans, Wolbertus (NED)
26 May 2023; 17:00	Gyene 18	(21–20, 21–20)	Luís 16	Court 2, Nazaré; Attendance: 150; Referees: Weijmans, Wolbertus (NED)
26 May 2023; 17:00	2×	Report	2×	Court 2, Nazaré; Attendance: 150; Referees: Weijmans, Wolbertus (NED)

==== Group II ====
Pos	Team	Pld	W	L	SW	SL	SD	GPF	GPA	GPD	Pts
1	Denmark	3	3	0	6	1	+5	139	126	+13	6
2	Portugal	3	2	1	4	3	+1	119	122	−3	4
3	Croatia	3	1	2	2	4	−2	123	126	−3	2
4	Ukraine	3	0	3	2	6	−4	128	135	−7	0

25 May 2023; 14:00	Portugal	2–0	Croatia	Court 1, Nazaré; Attendance: 200; Referees: Fabryczny, Rawicki (POL)
25 May 2023; 14:00	Paulo, Rodrigues 12	(24–22, 18–14)	Hranjec 10	Court 1, Nazaré; Attendance: 200; Referees: Fabryczny, Rawicki (POL)
25 May 2023; 14:00	2×	Report		Court 1, Nazaré; Attendance: 200; Referees: Fabryczny, Rawicki (POL)

25 May 2023; 14:00	Denmark	2–1	Ukraine	Court 2, Nazaré; Attendance: 113; Referees: Buchón-Perea, Del Valle-Encuentra (ESP)
25 May 2023; 14:00	Hansen 12	(14–20, 24–22, 9–8)	Tsymbaliuk 20	Court 2, Nazaré; Attendance: 113; Referees: Buchón-Perea, Del Valle-Encuentra (ESP)
25 May 2023; 14:00	1×	Report		Court 2, Nazaré; Attendance: 113; Referees: Buchón-Perea, Del Valle-Encuentra (ESP)

26 May 2023; 12:00	Portugal	0–2	Denmark	Court 1, Nazaré; Attendance: 300; Referees: Weijmans, Wolbertus (NED)
26 May 2023; 12:00	Paulo 10	(18–23, 18–23)	Andersen 12	Court 1, Nazaré; Attendance: 300; Referees: Weijmans, Wolbertus (NED)
26 May 2023; 12:00	2× 1× (red card)	Report	1×	Court 1, Nazaré; Attendance: 300; Referees: Weijmans, Wolbertus (NED)

26 May 2023; 12:00	Croatia	2–0	Ukraine	Court 2, Nazaré; Attendance: 50; Referees: Bareš, Uhlíř (CZE)
26 May 2023; 12:00	Valentaković 25	(20–16, 27–22)	Kozakevych 14	Court 2, Nazaré; Attendance: 50; Referees: Bareš, Uhlíř (CZE)
26 May 2023; 12:00	1×	Report		Court 2, Nazaré; Attendance: 50; Referees: Bareš, Uhlíř (CZE)

26 May 2023; 16:00	Ukraine	1–2	Portugal	Court 1, Nazaré; Attendance: 213; Referees: Fabryczny, Rawicki (POL)
26 May 2023; 16:00	Kopyshynskyi 18	(16–14, 16–17, 8–10)	Conceição 16	Court 1, Nazaré; Attendance: 213; Referees: Fabryczny, Rawicki (POL)
26 May 2023; 16:00	2×	Report	2×	Court 1, Nazaré; Attendance: 213; Referees: Fabryczny, Rawicki (POL)

26 May 2023; 16:00	Croatia	0–2	Denmark	Court 2, Nazaré; Attendance: 150; Referees: Buchón-Perea, Del Valle-Encuentra (ESP)
26 May 2023; 16:00	Valentaković 20	(22–23, 18–23)	Moss 20	Court 2, Nazaré; Attendance: 150; Referees: Buchón-Perea, Del Valle-Encuentra (ESP)
26 May 2023; 16:00	1×	Report	2× 1× (red card)	Court 2, Nazaré; Attendance: 150; Referees: Buchón-Perea, Del Valle-Encuentra (ESP)

=== Placement round ===
==== 13–16th place playoffs ====
Cross matches 13–16
27 May
France	2
Switzerland	0
27 May
Romania	1
Netherlands	2

Thirteenth place
28 May
France	2
Netherlands	1
Fifteenth place
28 May
Switzerland	0
Romania	2

===== Cross matches 13–16 =====
27 May 2023; 10:00	France	2–0	Switzerland	Court 4, Nazaré; Attendance: 40; Referees: Pipitone, Sardisco (ITA)
27 May 2023; 10:00	Goedert, Yamdjeu 12	(26–14, 34–15)	Madliger 13	Court 4, Nazaré; Attendance: 40; Referees: Pipitone, Sardisco (ITA)
27 May 2023; 10:00		Report		Court 4, Nazaré; Attendance: 40; Referees: Pipitone, Sardisco (ITA)

27 May 2023; 11:00	Romania	1–2	Netherlands	Court 4, Nazaré; Attendance: 150; Referees: Fabryczny, Rawicki (POL)
27 May 2023; 11:00	Paul 14	(26–24, 12–26, 4–8)	Voermans 24	Court 4, Nazaré; Attendance: 150; Referees: Fabryczny, Rawicki (POL)
27 May 2023; 11:00	1×	Report	1×	Court 4, Nazaré; Attendance: 150; Referees: Fabryczny, Rawicki (POL)

===== Fifteenth place =====
28 May 2023; 10:00	Switzerland	0–2	Romania	Court 4, Nazaré; Attendance: 40; Referees: Deiters, Stumpfe (GER)
28 May 2023; 10:00	Von der Weid 16	(24–32, 18–26)	Hornet 14	Court 4, Nazaré; Attendance: 40; Referees: Deiters, Stumpfe (GER)
28 May 2023; 10:00		Report		Court 4, Nazaré; Attendance: 40; Referees: Deiters, Stumpfe (GER)

===== Thirteenth place =====
28 May 2023; 10:00	France	2–1	Netherlands	Court 3, Nazaré; Attendance: 150; Referees: Lacković, Višnjić (CRO)
28 May 2023; 10:00	Yamdjeu 12	(21–12, 12–24, 9–8)	Robben 20	Court 3, Nazaré; Attendance: 150; Referees: Lacković, Višnjić (CRO)
28 May 2023; 10:00		Report	2×	Court 3, Nazaré; Attendance: 150; Referees: Lacković, Višnjić (CRO)

==== 9–12th place playoffs ====
Cross matches 9–12
27 May
Greece	0
Italy	2
27 May
Poland	0
Sweden	2

Ninth place
28 May
Sweden	1
Italy	2
Eleventh place
28 May
Poland	1
Greece	2

===== Cross matches 9–12 =====
27 May 2023; 10:00	Poland	0–2	Sweden	Court 3, Nazaré; Attendance: 40; Referees: Weijmans, Wolbertus (NED)
27 May 2023; 10:00	Miedziński 14	(18–19, 16–18)	Paldanius 16	Court 3, Nazaré; Attendance: 40; Referees: Weijmans, Wolbertus (NED)
27 May 2023; 10:00		Report		Court 3, Nazaré; Attendance: 40; Referees: Weijmans, Wolbertus (NED)

27 May 2023; 11:00	Greece	0–2	Italy	Court 3, Nazaré; Attendance: 100; Referees: Lacković, Višnjić (CRO)
27 May 2023; 11:00	Ladakis 16	(24–26, 20–21)	Dieguez 14	Court 3, Nazaré; Attendance: 100; Referees: Lacković, Višnjić (CRO)
27 May 2023; 11:00	2×	Report	3× 1× (red card)	Court 3, Nazaré; Attendance: 100; Referees: Lacković, Višnjić (CRO)

===== Eleventh place =====
28 May 2023; 13:00	Poland	1–2	Greece	Court 3, Nazaré; Attendance: 20; Referees: Constantin, Enache (ROU)
28 May 2023; 13:00	Wojdak 15	(22–23, 21–20, 6–9)	Tsanaxidis 17	Court 3, Nazaré; Attendance: 20; Referees: Constantin, Enache (ROU)
28 May 2023; 13:00		Report		Court 3, Nazaré; Attendance: 20; Referees: Constantin, Enache (ROU)

===== Ninth place =====
28 May 2023; 13:00	Sweden	1–2	Italy	Court 2, Nazaré; Attendance: 80; Referees: Barbosa, Lemos (POR)
28 May 2023; 13:00	Johansson 20	(19–22, 22–18, 6–8)	Dieguez 16	Court 2, Nazaré; Attendance: 80; Referees: Barbosa, Lemos (POR)
28 May 2023; 13:00	3×	Report	2×	Court 2, Nazaré; Attendance: 80; Referees: Barbosa, Lemos (POR)

==== 1–8th place playoffs ====
Quarter finals
27 May
Hungary	2
Ukraine	0
27 May
Portugal	2
Spain	1
27 May
Denmark	2
Norway	0
27 May
Germany	2
Croatia	0

Semi finals
27 May
Hungary	2
Portugal	1
27 May
Denmark	1
Germany	2

Final
28 May
Hungary	2
Germany	0
Third place
28 May
Portugal	0
Denmark	2

Cross matches 5–8
27 May
Ukraine	1
Spain	2
27 May
Norway	2
Croatia	1

Fifth place
28 May
Spain	2
Norway	0
Seventh place
28 May
Ukraine	0
Croatia	2

===== Quarter finals =====
27 May 2023; 10:00	Denmark	2–0	Norway	Court 1, Nazaré; Attendance: 150; Referees: Buchón-Perea, Del Valle-Encuentra (ESP)
27 May 2023; 10:00	Andersen 20	(23–22, 20–14)	Henriksen 12	Court 1, Nazaré; Attendance: 150; Referees: Buchón-Perea, Del Valle-Encuentra (ESP)
27 May 2023; 10:00		Report		Court 1, Nazaré; Attendance: 150; Referees: Buchón-Perea, Del Valle-Encuentra (ESP)

27 May 2023; 10:00	Hungary	2–0	Ukraine	Court 2, Nazaré; Attendance: 100; Referees: Deding Søe, Haar Visholm (DEN)
27 May 2023; 10:00	Gyene 24	(26–22, 26–18)	Horovyi 18	Court 2, Nazaré; Attendance: 100; Referees: Deding Søe, Haar Visholm (DEN)
27 May 2023; 10:00		Report	1×	Court 2, Nazaré; Attendance: 100; Referees: Deding Søe, Haar Visholm (DEN)

27 May 2023; 11:00	Portugal	2–1	Spain	Court 1, Nazaré; Attendance: 750; Referees: Deiters, Stumpfe (GER)
27 May 2023; 11:00	Santos 16	(22–18, 14–19, 7–2)	Venegas 12	Court 1, Nazaré; Attendance: 750; Referees: Deiters, Stumpfe (GER)
27 May 2023; 11:00	1×	Report	1×	Court 1, Nazaré; Attendance: 750; Referees: Deiters, Stumpfe (GER)

27 May 2023; 11:00	Germany	2–0	Croatia	Court 2, Nazaré; Attendance: 137; Referees: Barbosa, Lemos (POR)
27 May 2023; 11:00	Liebeck 18	(22–20, 23–22)	Bura 12	Court 2, Nazaré; Attendance: 137; Referees: Barbosa, Lemos (POR)
27 May 2023; 11:00	1×	Report	2×	Court 2, Nazaré; Attendance: 137; Referees: Barbosa, Lemos (POR)

===== Cross matches 5–8 =====
27 May 2023; 15:00	Ukraine	1–2	Spain	Court 2, Nazaré; Attendance: 150; Referees: Bareš, Uhlíř (CZE)
27 May 2023; 15:00	Kopyshynskyi 18	(16–15, 22–23, 2–7)	Luís 14	Court 2, Nazaré; Attendance: 150; Referees: Bareš, Uhlíř (CZE)
27 May 2023; 15:00	2×	Report	2×	Court 2, Nazaré; Attendance: 150; Referees: Bareš, Uhlíř (CZE)

27 May 2023; 16:00	Norway	2–1	Croatia	Court 2, Nazaré; Attendance: 100; Referees: Deiters, Stumpfe (GER)
27 May 2023; 16:00	Henriksen 19	(23–18, 20–27, 7–6)	Hranjec 18	Court 2, Nazaré; Attendance: 100; Referees: Deiters, Stumpfe (GER)
27 May 2023; 16:00		Report	1×	Court 2, Nazaré; Attendance: 100; Referees: Deiters, Stumpfe (GER)

===== Seventh place =====
28 May 2023; 10:00	Ukraine	0–2	Croatia	Court 2, Nazaré; Attendance: 30; Referees: Weijmans, Wolbertus (NED)
28 May 2023; 10:00	Kozakevych 10	(14–26, 20–22)	Bura 30	Court 2, Nazaré; Attendance: 30; Referees: Weijmans, Wolbertus (NED)
28 May 2023; 10:00	1×	Report	1×	Court 2, Nazaré; Attendance: 30; Referees: Weijmans, Wolbertus (NED)

===== Fifth place =====
28 May 2023; 10:00	Spain	2–0	Norway	Court 1, Nazaré; Attendance: 350; Referees: Fabryczny, Rawicki (POL)
28 May 2023; 10:00	Luís 17	(23–22, 25–16)	Inglingstad 12	Court 1, Nazaré; Attendance: 350; Referees: Fabryczny, Rawicki (POL)
28 May 2023; 10:00	4× 1× (red card)	Report	5× 1× (red card)	Court 1, Nazaré; Attendance: 350; Referees: Fabryczny, Rawicki (POL)

===== Semi finals =====
27 May 2023; 15:00	Hungary	2–1	Portugal	Court 1, Nazaré; Attendance: 400; Referees: Weijmans, Wolbertus (NED)
27 May 2023; 15:00	Gyene 16	(26–22, 16–21, 10–8)	Costa, Ferreira 14	Court 1, Nazaré; Attendance: 400; Referees: Weijmans, Wolbertus (NED)
27 May 2023; 15:00		Report		Court 1, Nazaré; Attendance: 400; Referees: Weijmans, Wolbertus (NED)

27 May 2023; 16:00	Denmark	1–2	Germany	Court 1, Nazaré; Attendance: 1100; Referees: Fabryczny, Rawicki (POL)
27 May 2023; 16:00	Moss 12	(14–19, 22–20, 4–7)	Liebeck 14	Court 1, Nazaré; Attendance: 1100; Referees: Fabryczny, Rawicki (POL)
27 May 2023; 16:00		Report	2×	Court 1, Nazaré; Attendance: 1100; Referees: Fabryczny, Rawicki (POL)

===== Third place =====
28 May 2023; 13:00	Portugal	0–2	Denmark	Court 1, Nazaré; Attendance: 300; Referees: Deiters, Stumpfe (GER)
28 May 2023; 13:00	Santos 18	(22–24, 20–21)	Moss 15	Court 1, Nazaré; Attendance: 300; Referees: Deiters, Stumpfe (GER)
28 May 2023; 13:00	3× 1× (red card)	Report	1×	Court 1, Nazaré; Attendance: 300; Referees: Deiters, Stumpfe (GER)

===== Final =====
28 May 2023; 15:00	Hungary	2–0	Germany	Court 1, Nazaré; Attendance: 1200; Referees: Bareš, Uhlíř (CZE)
28 May 2023; 15:00	John 12	(20–16, 20–18)	Zelser 10	Court 1, Nazaré; Attendance: 1200; Referees: Bareš, Uhlíř (CZE)
28 May 2023; 15:00		Report	1×	Court 1, Nazaré; Attendance: 1200; Referees: Bareš, Uhlíř (CZE)

=== Final standings ===
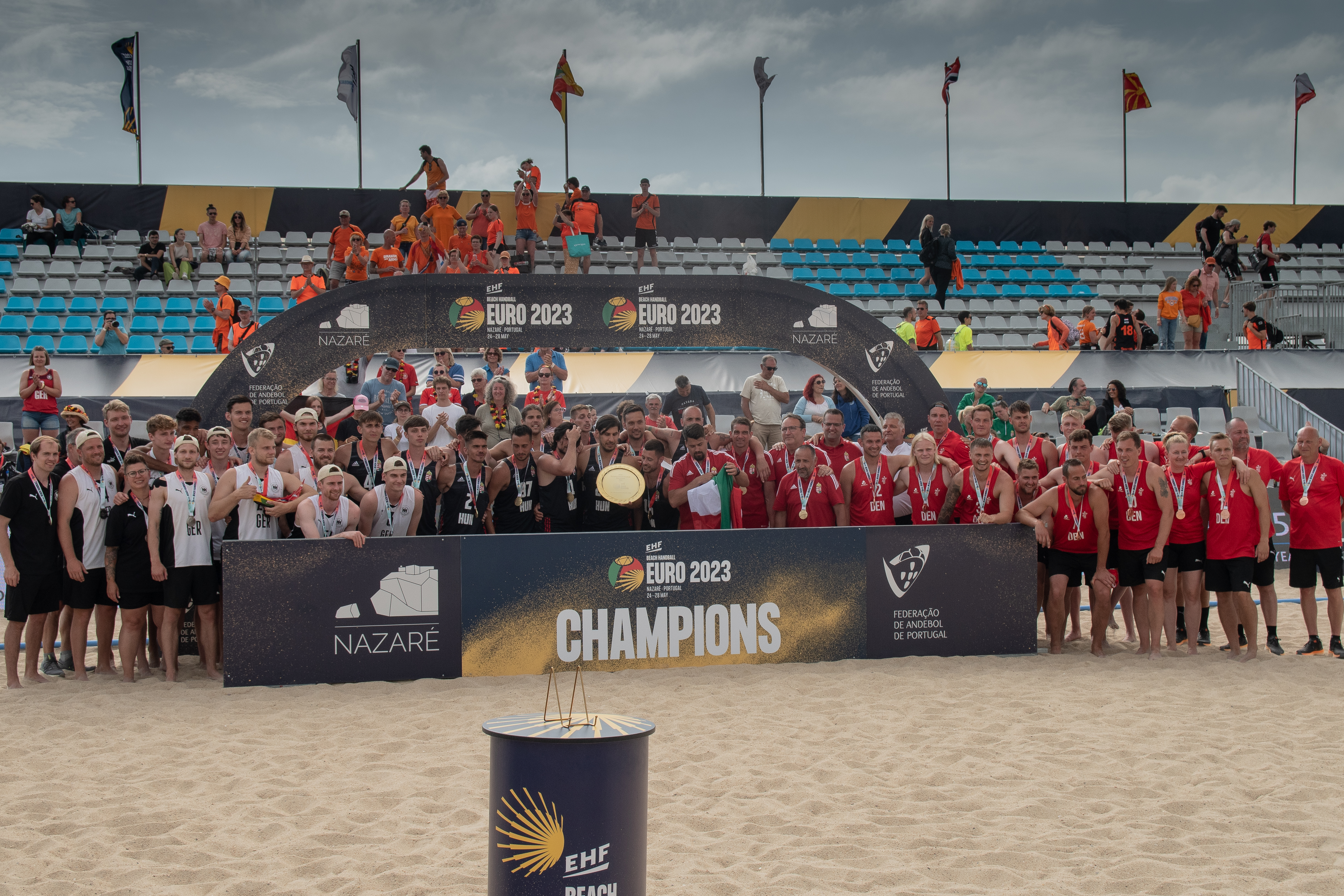
Men's medailists

Place	Team
1st place, gold medalist(s)	Hungary
2nd place, silver medalist(s)	Germany
3rd place, bronze medalist(s)	Denmark
4	Portugal
5	Spain
6	Norway
7	Croatia
8	Ukraine
9	Italy
10	Sweden
11	Greece
12	Poland
13	France
14	Netherlands
15	Romania
16	Switzerland

Team qualified to the 2023 European Games

== Women's Tournament ==
=== Preliminary round ===
Team advance to Main round
Team advance to Consolation round

==== Group A ====
Team	Pld	W	L	SW	SL	SD	PF	PF	PD	Pts
Germany	3	3	0	6	0	+6	157	108	+49	6
Denmark	3	2	1	4	2	+2	128	115	+13	4
Italy	3	1	2	2	5	-3	120	135	-15	2
France	3	0	3	1	6	-5	100	147	-47	0

==== Group B ====
Team	Pld	W	L	SW	SL	SD	PF	PF	PD	Pts
Netherlands	3	3	0	6	0	+6	138	69	+69	6
Portugal	3	2	1	4	2	+2	96	92	+4	4
Ukraine	3	1	2	2	4	-2	97	109	-12	2
North Macedonia	3	0	3	0	6	-6	72	133	-61	0

==== Group C ====
Team	Pld	W	L	SW	SL	SD	PF	PF	PD	Pts
Norway	3	3	0	6	2	+4	147	135	+13	6
Greece	3	2	1	5	3	+2	156	137	+19	4
Hungary	3	1	2	4	4	0	150	135	+15	2
Slovakia	3	0	3	0	6	-6	96	142	-46	0

==== Group D ====
Team	Pld	W	L	SW	SL	SD	PF	PF	PD	Pts
Spain	3	3	0	6	2	+4	144	126	+18	6
Croatia	3	2	1	5	3	+2	131	120	+11	4
Poland	3	1	2	3	4	-1	109	123	-14	2
Romania	3	0	3	1	6	-5	106	121	-15	0

=== Main round ===
Team advance to Quarterfinals
Team advance to Cross matches 9-16

==== Group I ====
Team	Pld	W	L	SW	SL	SD	PF	PF	PD	Pts
Germany	3	3	0	6	1	+5	137	113	+24	6
Norway	3	2	1	4	2	+2	123	118	+5	4
Croatia	3	1	2	2	4	-2	121	128	-7	2
Portugal	3	0	3	1	6	-5	107	129	-22	0

==== Group II ====
Team	Pld	W	L	SW	SL	SD	PF	PF	PD	Pts
Denmark	3	3	0	6	1	+5	134	109	+25	6
Spain	3	2	1	4	3	+1	114	117	-3	4
Netherlands	3	1	2	4	4	0	130	113	+17	2
Greece	3	0	3	0	6	-6	102	141	-39	0

=== Placement round ===
Quarterfinals
Germany	2
Greece	0
Spain	2
Croatia	0
Denmark	1
Portugal	2
Norway	0
Netherlands	2

Semifinals
Germany	2
Spain	1
Portugal	0
Netherlands	2

Finale
Germany	2
Netherlands	1
3rd place
Spain	2
Portugal	1

Cross matches 5−8
Denmark	1
Norway	2
Greece	2
Croatia	0

5th place
Norway	2
Greece	0
7th place
Denmark	2
Croatia	0

Cross matches 9−12
Poland	1
Hungary	2
Ukraine	2
Italy	1

9th place
Hungary	2
Ukraine	0
11th place
Poland	1
Italy	2

=== Final standings ===
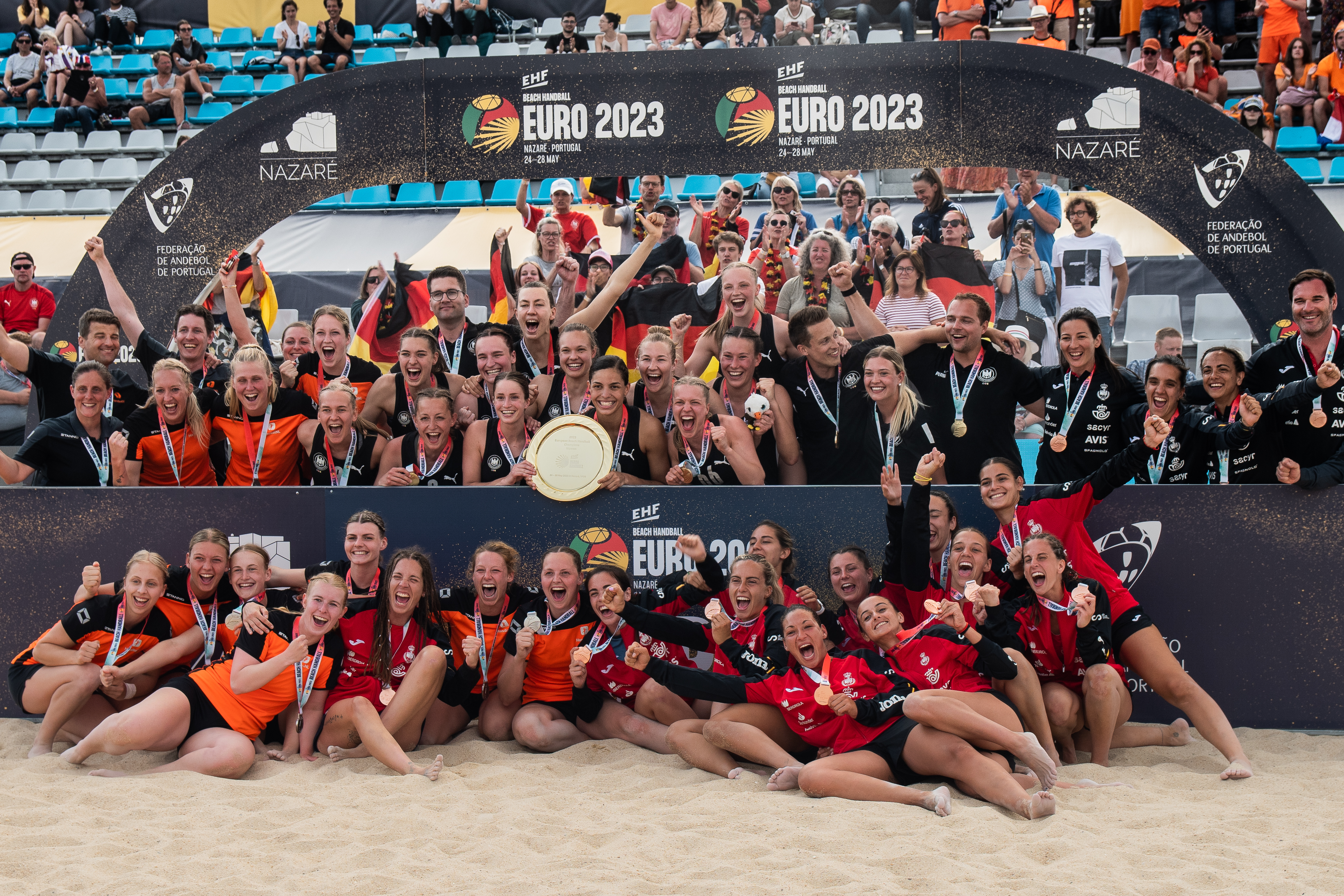
Women's medailists

Place	Team
1st place, gold medalist(s)	Germany
2nd place, silver medalist(s)	Netherlands
3rd place, bronze medalist(s)	Spain
4	Portugal
5	Norway
6	Greece
7	Denmark
8	Croatia
9	Hungary
10	Ukraine
11	Italy
12	Poland
13	France
14	Slovakia
15	Romania
16	North Macedonia

Team qualified to the 2023 European Games

== All-star teams ==
The all star teams for the tournament were:
Men's EHF Beach Handball EURO 2023 All-star Team

Goalkeeper: Moritz Ebert (GER)

Defender: Francisco Santos (POR)

MVP: Gabriel Conceição (POR)

Top scorer: Domingo Jesús Luis Mosquera (ESP) – 135 points

Fair Play Team: Switzerland
Women's EHF Beach Handball EURO 2023 All-star Team

Goalkeeper: Ditte Folden Vind (DEN)

Defender: Catarina Oliveira (POR)

MVP: María Asunción Batista Portero (ESP)

Top scorer: María Asunción Batista Portero (ESP)

Fair Play Team: Hungary
