= Denmark men's national beach handball team =

Denmark

Information
- Association: Danish Handball Federation
- Coach: Gorm Andersen
- Assistant coach: Ronnie Andersen; Martin Hjortshøj

Colours
Home	Away

Results

World Championship
- Appearances: 6 (First in 2012)
- Best result: 2nd (2022, 2024)
- Last updated on Unknown.

The Denmark national beach handball team is a national team of Denmark. It is governed by the Danish Handball Federation and takes part in international beach handball competitions.

== Tournament record ==
=== World Championships ===
- 2012 – 5th place
- 2014 – 4th place
- 2018 – 7th place
- 2022 – 2nd place
- 2024 – 2nd place
- 2026 – 7th place

=== European Beach Handball Championship ===
- 2007 – 12th place
- 2009 – 4th place
- 2011 – 7th place
- 2013 – 4th place
- 2017 – 7th place
- 2019 – Gold medal
- 2021 – Gold medal
- 2023 – Bronze medal
- 2025 – 7th place

== See also ==
- Denmark women's national beach handball team
