= Germany men's national beach handball team =

Germany

Information
- Association: German Handball Association
- Coach: Marten Franke
- Assistant coach: Erik Gülzow

Colours
Home	Away

Results

World Games
- Appearances: 2 (First in 2005)
- Best result: Champions (2025)

World Championship
- Appearances: 3 (First in 2006)
- Best result: Champions (2026)
- Last updated on Unknown.

The Germany men's national beach handball team is the national team of Germany. It is governed by the German Handball Association and takes part in international beach handball competitions.

== Results ==
=== World Championships ===
- 2006 – 8th place
- 2024 – 4th place
- 2026 –
- 2028 – Qualified

=== European Championships ===
- 2006 – 4th place
- 2023 –
- 2025 –
