= Hungary women's national beach handball team =

Hungary

Information
- Association: Hungarian Handball Federation

Colours
| Home | Away |

Results

World Championship
- Appearances: 6 (First in 2004)
- Best result: 2nd (2014)
- Last updated on Unknown.

Hungary women's national beach handball team
Medal record

Representing Hungary

Women's Beach handball

World Championship
| Silver medal – second place | 2014 Brazil | |

European Championship
| Gold medal – first place | 2013 Denmark | |
| Gold medal – first place | 2015 Spain | |

World Games
| Silver medal – second place | 2013 Colombia | Team |

The Hungary women's national beach handball team is the national beach handball team of Hungary. It is governed by the Hungarian Handball Federation and takes part in international beach handball competitions.

== Results ==
=== World Championships ===
- 2004 – 5th place
- 2006 – 7th place
- 2010 – 7th place
- 2012 – 4th place
- 2014 – 2nd place
- 2016 – 4th place
- 2022 – Qualified

=== European Championships ===
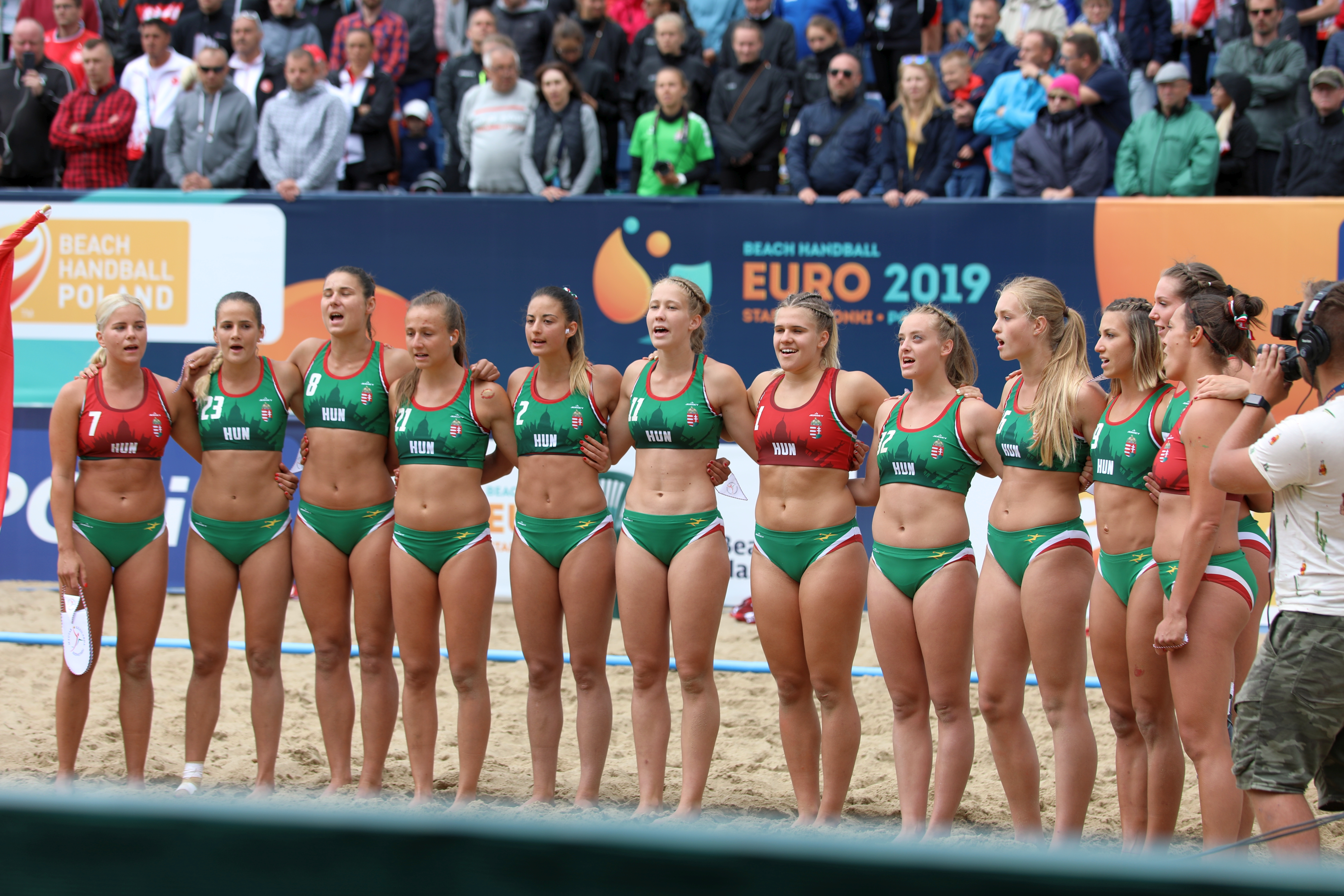
The Hungarian team before the final of the 2019 European Championships

- 2009 – 6th place
- 2011 – 5th place
- 2013 – 1st place
- 2015 – 1st place
- 2017 – 10th place
- 2019 – 2nd place

== Team ==
=== Current squad ===
The following team represented Hungary on the 2019 European Beach Handball Championships and the World Beach Games 2019²:

- Rebeka Benzsay¹
- Csenge Braun¹
- Renáta Csiki¹²
- Fanni Friebesz¹
- Ágnes Győri¹² (GK)
- Gréta Hadfi¹ (GK)
- Réka Király¹²
- Fruzsina Kretz¹²
- Gabriella Landi¹²
- Evelin Speth¹²
- Sára Sütő²
- Emese Tóth¹²
- Luca Vajda¹²
- Ramóna Vártok² (GK)

=== Staff members ===
- (Hungary) Head Coach: Bakó Botond
- (Hungary) Assistant Coach: Andrea Farkas
