= Hungary men's national beach handball team =

Hungary

Information
- Association: Hungarian Handball Federation
- Coach: Tamás Hajdu
- Assistant coach: Bence Priczel

Colours
Home	Away

Results

World Championship
- Appearances: 8 (First in 2004)
- Best result: 2nd (2010)
- Last updated on Unknown.

Hungary men's national beach handball team
Medal record

Men's beach handball

Representing Hungary

World Championship
Silver medal – second place	2010 Turkey	
Bronze medal – third place	2018 Russia	

European Championship
Silver medal – second place	2006 Germany	
Bronze medal – third place	2007 Italy	
Bronze medal – third place	2009 Norway	
Bronze medal – third place	2019 Poland	
Gold medal – first place	2023 Portugal	

The Hungary national beach handball team is the national team of Hungary. It is governed by the Hungarian Handball Federation and takes part in international beach handball competitions.

== World Championships results ==
- 2004 – 6th place
- 2006 – 5th place
- 2008 – 7th place
- 2010 – 2nd place
- 2016 – 4th place
- 2018 – 3rd place
- 2024 – 7th place
- 2026 – 8th place
