= Serbia men's national beach handball team =

National team in Serbia

Serbia

Information
- Association: Handball Federation of Serbia

Colours
Home	Away

Results

World Championship
- Appearances: 2 (First in 2008)
- Best result: 3rd (2008)
- Last updated on Unknown.

Serbia men's national beach handball team
Medal record

Men's beach handball

Representing Serbia

World Championship
Bronze medal – third place	2008 Spain	

Serbia national beach handball team is the national team of Serbia. It is governed by the Handball Federation of Serbia and takes part in international beach handball competitions.

== Results ==
=== World Championships ===
- 2008 – 3rd place
- 2014 – 6th place

=== European Championships ===
- 2002 – 5th place
- 2004 – 8th place
- 2006 – 5th place
- 2007 – 4th place
- 2011 – 7th place
- 2013 – 4th place

== See also ==
- Serbia women's national beach handball team
