= Beach handball at the South American Beach Games =

Kind of beach games

Beach Handball has been a Beach South American Games event since 2009 in Montevideo, Uruguay.

== Men ==
=== Summary ===
Year	Host	Final			Third place match		
Year	Host	Champion	Score	Runner-up	Third place	Score	Fourth place
2009; Details	(Uruguay); Montevideo	Brazil	2–0	Uruguay	Chile	2–0	Ecuador
2011; Details	(Ecuador); Manta	Brazil	2–0	Argentina	Venezuela	2–1	Ecuador
2014; Details	(Venezuela); Vargas	Venezuela	2–0	Uruguay	Argentina	2–0	Ecuador
2019; Details	(Argentina); Rosario	Brazil	2–1	Uruguay	Venezuela	2–0	Chile
2023; Details	(Colombia); Santa Marta	Uruguay	2–0	Argentina	Chile	2–0	Venezuela

=== Medal table ===
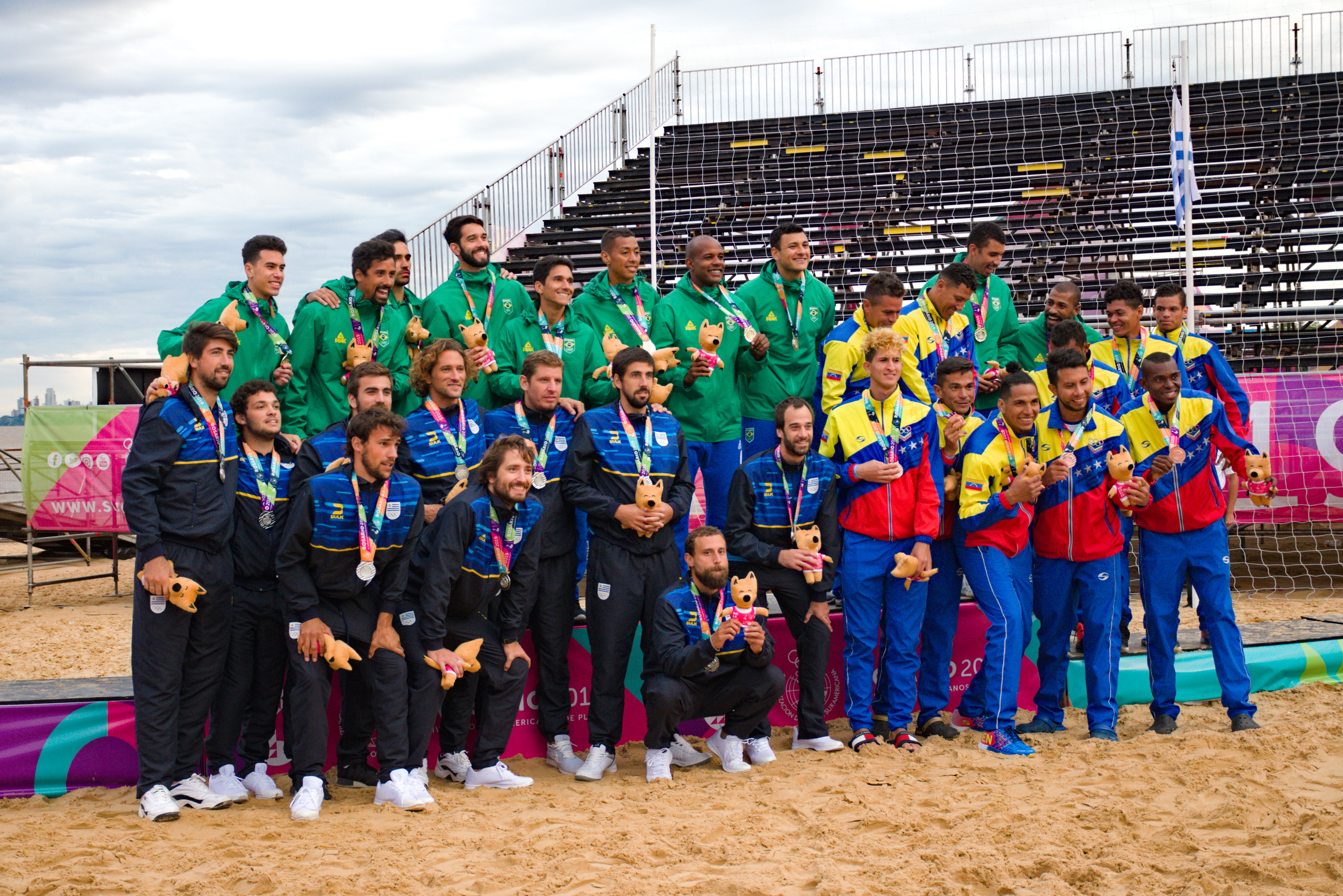
Men's Medaillists in 2019

Rank	Nation	Gold	Silver	Bronze	Total
1	Brazil	3	0	0	3
2	Uruguay	1	3	0	4
3	Venezuela	1	0	2	3
4	Argentina	0	2	1	3
5	Chile	0	0	2	2
Totals (5 entries)		5	5	5	15

=== Participating nations ===
Nation	(Uruguay) 2009	(Ecuador) 2011	(Venezuela) 2014	(Argentina) 2019	(Colombia) 2023	Years
Argentina	5th	2nd	3rd	5th	2nd	5
Brazil	1st	1st	-	1st	5th	4
Chile	3rd	5th	-	4th	3rd	4
Colombia	-	7th	-	9th	8th	3
Ecuador	4th	4th	4th	6th	7th	5
Paraguay	6th	6th	-	7th	6th	4
Peru	-	8th	-	8th	9th	3
Uruguay	2nd	-	2nd	2nd	1st	4
Venezuela	-	3rd	1st	3rd	4th	4
Total	6	8	4	9	9	

== Women ==
=== Summary ===
Year	Host	Final			Third place match		
Year	Host	Champion	Score	Runner-up	Third place	Score	Fourth place
2009; Details	(Uruguay); Montevideo	Brazil	2–0	Uruguay	Argentina	2–0	Paraguay
2011; Details	(Ecuador); Manta	Brazil	2–0	Argentina	Paraguay	2–0	Uruguay
2014; Details	(Venezuela); Vargas	Venezuela	2–1	Argentina	Paraguay	2–0	Ecuador
2019; Details	(Argentina); Rosario	Argentina	2–1	Brazil	Paraguay	2–0	Venezuela
2023; Details	(Colombia); Santa Marta	Brazil	2–1	Argentina	Uruguay	2–1	Venezuela

=== Medal table ===
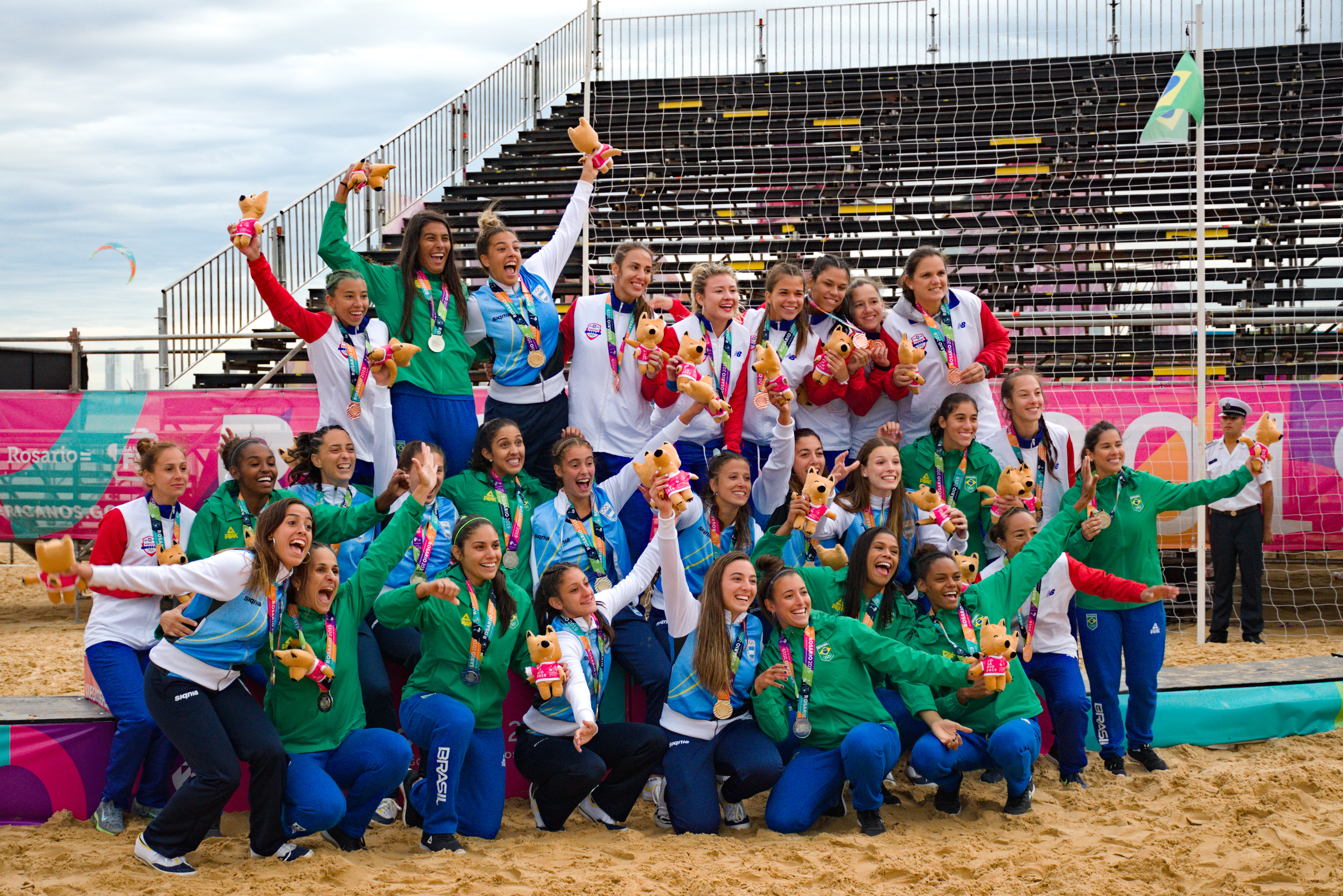
Women's Medaillists in 2019

Rank	Nation	Gold	Silver	Bronze	Total
1	Brazil	3	1	0	4
2	Argentina	1	3	1	5
3	Venezuela	1	0	0	1
4	Uruguay	0	1	1	2
5	Paraguay	0	0	3	3
Totals (5 entries)		5	5	5	15

=== Participating nations ===
Nation	(Uruguay) 2009	(Ecuador) 2011	(Venezuela) 2014	(Argentina) 2019	(Colombia) 2023	Years
Argentina	3rd	2nd	2nd	1st	2nd	5
Brazil	1st	1st	-	2nd	1st	4
Chile	-	-	-	5th	6th	2
Colombia	-	7th	-	6th	7th	3
Ecuador	-	6th	4th	-	-	2
Paraguay	4th	3rd	3rd	3rd	5th	4
Peru	-	-	-	7th	-	1
Uruguay	2nd	4th	-	-	3rd	3
Venezuela	-	5th	1st	4th	4th	4
Total	4	7	4	7	7	
