= Pan American Beach Handball Championship =

The Pan American Beach Handball Championship was the official competition for Men's and Women's national beach handball teams of America. In addition to crowning the Pan American champions, the tournament also served as a qualifying tournament for the Beach Handball World Championships. In 2018, the PATHF folded and the tournament was replaced with the North America & the Caribbean and South & Central American championships.

== Men's ==
=== Summary ===
Year	Host	Final			Third Place Match		
Year	Host	Champion	Score	Second Place	Third Place	Score	Fourth Place
1998; Details	(Brazil); Rio de Janeiro	Brazil	–	Cuba	Argentina	–	United States
1999; Details	(Brazil); Rio de Janeiro	Brazil	–	Argentina	United States	–	Canada
2004; Details	(Uruguay); Montevideo	Brazil	2 – 0	Uruguay	Argentina	2 – 0	Paraguay
2008; Details	(Uruguay); Montevideo	Brazil	2 – 1	Uruguay	Argentina	2 – 0	Chile
2012; Details	(Uruguay); Montevideo	Brazil	2 – 0	Uruguay	Venezuela	No playoffs	Argentina
2014; Details	(Paraguay); Asunción	Brazil	2 – 0	Uruguay	Argentina	2 – 0	Paraguay
2016; Details	Vargas	United States	2 – 1	Uruguay	Venezuela	2 – 0	Argentina
2018; Details	Oceanside	Brazil	2 – 1	Uruguay	United States	2 – 0	Argentina

=== Medal table ===
Rank	Nation	Gold	Silver	Bronze	Total
1	Brazil	7	0	0	7
2	United States	1	0	2	3
3	Uruguay	0	6	0	6
4	Argentina	0	1	4	5
5	Cuba	0	1	0	1
6	Venezuela	0	0	2	2
Totals (6 entries)		8	8	8	24

=== Participating nations ===
Nation	(Brazil) 1998	(Brazil) 1999	(Uruguay) 2004	(Uruguay) 2008	(Uruguay) 2012	(Paraguay) 2014	(Venezuela) 2016	(United States) 2018	Years
Argentina	3rd	2nd	3rd	3rd	4th	3rd	4th	4th	8
Brazil	1st	1st	1st	1st	1st	1st	-	1st	7
Canada	6th	4th	-	-	-	-	-	-	2
Chile	-	-	-	4th	-	-	-	-	1
Cuba	2nd	-	-	-	-	-	-	-	1
Ecuador	-	-	-	-	5th	-	5th	-	2
Mexico	-	-	-	-	-	5th	-	6th	2
Paraguay	-	-	4th	-	-	4th	6th	5th	3
Puerto Rico	-	-	-	-	-	-	-	8th	1
Trinidad and Tobago	-	-	-	-	-	-	-	7th	1
United States	4th	3rd	-	-	-	-	1st	3rd	4
Uruguay	5th	-	2nd	2nd	2nd	2nd	2nd	2nd	7
Venezuela	-	-	-	-	3rd	-	3rd	-	3
Total	6	4	4	4	5	5	6	8	

== Women's ==
=== Summary ===
Year	Host	Final			Third Place Match		
Year	Host	Champion	Score	Second Place	Third Place	Score	Fourth Place
2004; Details	Montevideo	Uruguay	2 – 0	Brazil	Argentina	2 – 0	Paraguay
2008; Details	Montevideo	Brazil	No playoffs	Uruguay	Dominican Republic	No playoffs	Argentina
2012; Details	Montevideo	Brazil	2 – 0	Uruguay	Argentina	No playoffs	Paraguay
2014; Details	Asunción	Brazil	2 – 0	Uruguay	Argentina	2 – 0	Paraguay
2016; Details	Vargas	Uruguay	2 – 0	Argentina	Paraguay	2 – 1	Venezuela
2018; Details	Oceanside	Brazil	2 – 0	Uruguay	Paraguay	2 – 1	Mexico

=== Medal table ===
Rank	Nation	Gold	Silver	Bronze	Total
1	Brazil	4	1	0	5
2	Uruguay	2	4	0	6
3	Argentina	0	1	3	4
4	Paraguay	0	0	2	2
5	Dominican Republic	0	0	1	1
Totals (5 entries)		6	6	6	18

=== Participating nations ===
Nation	(Uruguay) 2004	(Uruguay) 2008	(Uruguay) 2012	(Paraguay) 2014	(Venezuela) 2016	(United States) 2018	Years
Argentina	3rd	4th	3rd	3rd	2nd	5th	6
Brazil	2nd	1st	1st	1st	-	1st	5
Chile	-	5th	-	-	-	7th	2
Dominican Republic	-	3rd	-	-	-	-	1
Mexico	-	-	-	5th	-	4th	2
Paraguay	4th	-	4th	4th	3rd	3rd	5
Trinidad and Tobago	-	-	-	-	-	8th	1
United States	-	-	5th	-	-	6th	2
Uruguay	1st	2nd	2nd	2nd	1st	2nd	6
Venezuela	-	-	-	-	4th	-	1
Total	4	5	5	5	4	8	
