= Beach handball at the World Games =

Beach handball is part of the World Games as an invitational sport since the 2001 edition. It has become an official sport of the World Games program since 2013.

== Men's tournament ==
From 2001 to 2009 Beach Handball was contested as a demonstration event. Since the 2013 edition the sport has been formally recognized as part of the World Games program.

Year	Host	Gold-medal match			Bronze-medal match		
Year	Host	Gold	Score	Silver	Bronze	Score	Fourth place
2001; Details	(Japan); Akita	Belarus	2 – 1	Spain	Brazil	2 – 1	Iran
2005; Details	(Germany); Duisburg	Russia	2 – 0	Spain	Croatia	2 – 1	Germany
2009; Details	(Taiwan); Kaohsiung	Brazil	2 – 0	Hungary	Croatia	2 – 0	Oman
2013; Details	(Colombia); Cali	Brazil	2 – 0	Russia	Croatia	2 – 1	Qatar
2017; Details	(Poland); Wrocław	Brazil	2 – 1	Croatia	Qatar	2 – 1	Hungary
2022; Details	(United States); Birmingham	Croatia	2 – 1	Qatar	Brazil	2 – 0	United States
2025; Details	(China); Chengdu	Germany	2 – 1	Portugal	Brazil	2 – 0	Spain

== Women's tournament ==
From 2001 to 2009 Beach Handball was contested as a demonstration event. Since the 2013 edition the sport is formally recognized as part of the World Games program.

Year	Host	Gold-medal match			Bronze-medal match		
Year	Host	Gold	Score	Silver	Bronze	Score	Fourth place
2001; Details	(Japan); Akita	Ukraine	2 – 1	Germany	Brazil	2 – 0	Japan
2005; Details	(Germany); Duisburg	Brazil	2 – 0	Hungary	Turkey	2 – 0	Croatia
2009; Details	(Taiwan); Kaohsiung	Italy	2 – 1	Croatia	Brazil	2 – 0	Macedonia
2013; Details	(Colombia); Cali	Brazil	2 – 1	Hungary	Norway	2 – 0	Chinese Taipei
2017; Details	(Poland); Wrocław	Brazil	2 – 0	Argentina	Spain	2 – 1	Norway
2022; Details	(United States); Birmingham	Germany	2 – 0	Norway	Argentina	2 – 0	United States
2025; Details	(China); Chengdu	Argentina	2 – 1	Germany	Spain	2 – 0	Denmark

== See also ==
- Beach Handball World Championships
