= Ana Acuña =

Paraguayan handball player (born 1994)

Personal information
- Full name: Ana Laura Acuña Insfrán
- Nationality: Paraguayan
- Born: 5 May 1994 (age 32)
- Height: 1.82 m (6 ft 0 in)

Sport
- Sport: Handball
- Position: Left wing
- Current club: Nueva Estrella
National team
Years	Team	Apps	(Gls)
–	Paraguay	150	(58)
Medal record
Pan American Championship
Bronze medal – third place	2017 Argentina
Bolivarian Games
Gold medal – first place	2013 Trujillo	Team
Beach Handball
South American Beach Games
Bronze medal – third place	2019 Rosario	Team
South & Central American Championship
Bronze medal – third place	2019 Brazil
Bolivarian Beach Games
Silver medal – second place	2016 Iquique	Team

Ana Laura Acuña Insfrán (born 5 May 1994) is a Paraguayan handball player for Nueva Estrella and the Paraguay national team.

She represented Paraguay at the 2013 World Women's Handball Championship in Serbia, where the Paraguayan team placed 21st, which is their best result to date (as of 2026). She also played at the 2017 World Women's Handball Championship.

== Individual awards ==
- 2014 Pan American Women's Junior Handball Championship: All Star Team Left Back
