= Alicia Villalba =

Paraguayan handball player (born 1988)

Personal information
- Full name: María Alicia Villalba Acosta
- Nationality: Paraguayan
- Born: 28 February 1988 (age 38)
- Height: 1.71 m (5 ft 7 in)

Sport
- Sport: Handball
- Position: Goalkeeper
- Current club: San José Handball
National team
Years	Team	Apps	(Gls)
–	Paraguay	150	(0)
Medal record
Handball
Pan American Championship
Bronze medal – third place	2017 Argentina
South and Central American Championship
Bronze medal – third place	2018 Brazil
Bronze medal – third place	2021 Paraguay
South American Games
Silver medal – second place	2022 Asunción	Team
Bolivarian Games
Gold medal – first place	2013 Trujillo	Team
Gold medal – first place	2017 Santa Marta	Team
Gold medal – first place	2022 Valledupar	Team
Beach handball
South American Beach Games
Bronze medal – third place	2019 Rosario	Team
South & Central American Championship
Bronze medal – third place	2019 Brazil
Bolivarian Beach Games
Silver medal – second place	2016 Iquique

María Alicia Villalba Acosta (born 28 February 1988) is a Paraguayan handball goalkeeper for San José Handball and the Paraguay national team.

She represented Paraguay at the 2013 World Women's Handball Championship in Serbia, where the Paraguayan team placed 21st, their best result ever (as of 2026).
