= Tunisia women's national beach handball team =

Tunisia

Information
- Nickname: نسور قرطاج (Eagles of Carthage)
- Association: Tunisian Handball Federation

Colours
Home	Away

Results

World Games
- Appearances: None

World Championship
- Appearances: 1 (First in 2020)

Mediterranean Beach Games
- Appearances: 1 (First in Pescara, Italy 2015)
- Best result: 4th 2015

African Beach Games
- Appearances: 2 (First in Cape Verde 2019)
- Best result: Champions (gold) 2019, 2023
- Last updated on Unknown.

Tunisia women's national beach handball team
Medal record

Representing Tunisia

Women's Beach handball

African Beach Games
Gold medal – first place	Cape Verde 2019	Team
Gold medal – first place	Tunisia 2023	Team

IHF Beach Handball Global Tour
Gold medal – first place	Tunisia 2023	Team

The Tunisia women's national beach handball team (Arabic: منتخب تونس لكرة اليد الشاطئية للسيدات), nicknamed Les Aigles de Carthage (The Eagles of Carthage or The Carthage Eagles), is the national beach handball team of Tunisia. It is governed by the Tunisian Handball Federation and takes part in international beach handball competitions.

== Competitive record ==
Champions Runners-up Third Place Fourth Place

- Red border color indicates tournament was held on home soil.

=== World Championship ===
Tunisia in the World Championships record
Year	Position
El Gouna, Egypt 2004	—
Rio de Janeiro, Brazil 2006	—
Cadiz, Spain 2008	—
Antalya, Turkey 2010	—
Muscat, Oman 2012	—
Recife, Brazil 2014	—
Budapest, Hungary 2016	12th place
Kazan, Russia 2018	—
Pescara, Italy 2020	cancelled due to the COVID-19 pandemic
Grete, Greece 2022	—
Total	1/9

=== World Games ===
Tunisia in the World Games record
Year	Position
Akita, Japan 2001	—
Duisburg, Germany 2005	—
Kaohsiung, Taiwan 2009	—
Cali, Colombia 2013	8th place
Wrocław, Poland 2017	8th place
(United States) Birmingham, USA 2022	—
Total	2/6

=== World Beach Games ===
Tunisia in the World Beach Games record
Year	Position
Doha, Qatar 2019	12th Place
Bali, Indonesia 2023	Q
Total	1/1

=== Mediterranean Beach Games ===
Tunisia in the Mediterranean Beach Games record
Year	Position
Pescara, Italy 2015	4th place
Patras, Greece 2019	4th place
Heraklion, Greece 2023	Not yet
Total	2/2

=== African Beach Games ===
Tunisia in the African Beach Games record
Year	Position
Sal, Cape Verde 2019	1st Place
Hammamet, Tunisia 2023	1st Place
Total	2/2

=== IHF Beach Handball Global Tour ===
Tunisia in the IHF Beach Handball Global Tour record
Year	Position
Hammamet, Tunisia 2023	1st Place
Total	1/1

== Current squad ==
Tunisia (TUN)
Safa Ameri
Ameni Jemmali
Leila Ouerfelli
Samira Arfaoui
Siwar Ammar
Amani Salmi
Manel Mrad
Hanen Romdhane
Boutheina Amiche

== See also ==
- Tunisia national beach handball team
- Tunisia women's national handball team
- Tunisia women's national junior handball team
- Tunisia women's national youth handball team
