= Pan American Youth Beach Handball Championship =

The Pan American Youth Beach Handball Championship was the official competition for men's and women's youth national beach handball teams of America. In addition to crowning the Pan American champions, the tournament also served as a qualifying tournament for the IHF Youth Beach Handball World Championship. Only two were held as in 2018, the PATHF disbanded and the tournaments were replaced with the North America & the Caribbean and South & Central American championships.

== Men ==
=== Summary ===
Year	Host	Final			Third place match		
Year	Host	Champion	Score	Runner-up	Third place	Score	Fourth place
2017; Details	(Paraguay); Asunción	Brazil	2–1	Argentina	Venezuela	2–0	Paraguay

=== Medal table ===
Rank	Nation	Gold	Silver	Bronze	Total
1	Brazil	1	0	0	1
2	Argentina	0	1	0	1
3	Venezuela	0	0	1	1
Totals (3 entries)		1	1	1	3

=== Participating nations ===
Nation	(Paraguay) 2017	Years
Argentina	2nd	1
Brazil	1st	1
Colombia	6th	1
Ecuador	8th	1
Paraguay	4th	1
Puerto Rico	7th	1
Uruguay	5th	1
Venezuela	3rd	1
Total	8	

== Women ==
=== Summary ===
Year	Host	Final			Third place match		
Year	Host	Champion	Score	Runner-up	Third place	Score	Fourth place
2017; Details	(Paraguay); Asunción	Argentina	2–0	Brazil	Paraguay	2–1	Venezuela

=== Medal table ===
Rank	Nation	Gold	Silver	Bronze	Total
1	Argentina	1	0	0	1
2	Brazil	0	1	0	1
3	Paraguay	0	0	1	1
Totals (3 entries)		1	1	1	3

=== Participating nations ===
Nation	(Paraguay) 2017	Years
Argentina	1st	1
Brazil	2nd	1
Colombia	6th	1
Paraguay	3rd	1
Uruguay	5th	1
Venezuela	4th	1
Total	6	
