= Gisella Bonomi =

Argentine beach handball player (born 2000)

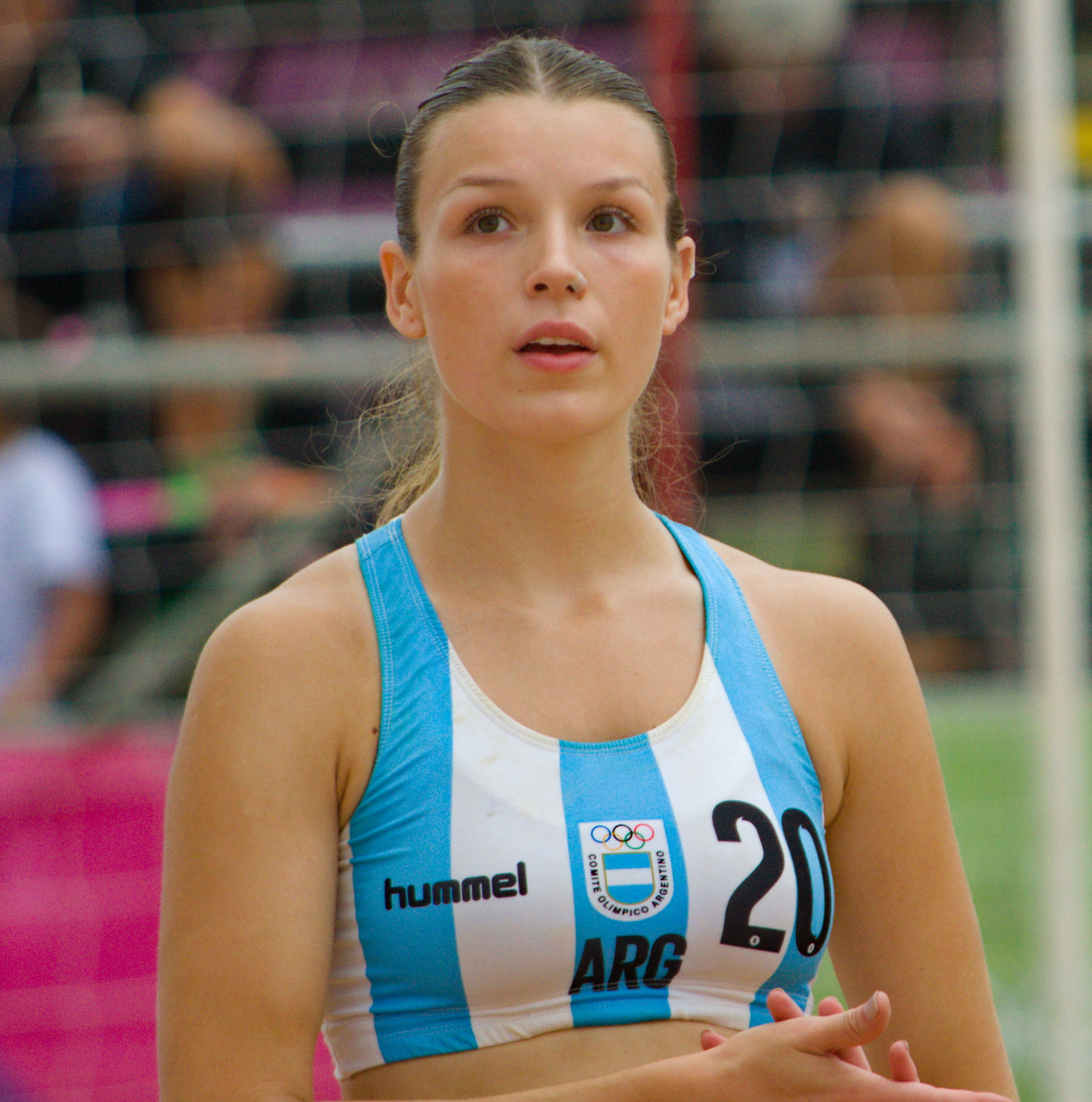
- Bonomi at the 2019 South American Beach Games.

Personal information
- Full name: Gisella Julieta Bonomi
- National team: Argentina women's national beach handball team
- Born: March 19, 2000 (age 26) Santa Rosa, Argentina
- Height: 1.80 m (5 ft 11 in)
- Weight: 75 kg (165 lb)

Sport
- Sport: Beach handball
- Position: pivot
- Club: Instituto de Formación y Educación Superior-IFES
- Team: Argentina women's national beach handball team
Medal record
Beach handball
Representing Argentina
World Championships
Winner	2026 Croatia
Youth Olympic Games
Winner	2018 Summer Youth Olympics
South American Beach Games
Winner	2019 South American Beach Games
World Games
Winner	2025 World Games

Gisella Julieta Bonomi (Santa Rosa, May 15, 2000) is an Argentine Beach handball player, who plays for Argentina women's national beach handball team. She was chosen as the flag bearer of the Argentine delegation in the 2019 South American Beach Games.

== History ==
She was part of the team that won the bronze medal at the 2017 World Cup in Mauritius, a competition where she was chosen as the best pivot. She won the Pan American Championship in Paraguay in the same year.

At the 2018 Summer Youth Olympics held in Buenos Aires, Argentina, she represented her country in the beach handball discipline, a competition where she won the gold medal with her team defeating the Croatian women's team in the final.

At the 2019 South American Beach Games in Rosario, Argentina, she won a gold medal in beach handball, defeating the Brazilian women's team in the final.

At the 2025 World Games in Chengdu, China, she won a gold medal in beach handball, defeating the Germany women's team in the final, she was also named the championship's top scorer with 78 points and the best center on the ideal team.

== Achievements ==
=== Podiums ===
Year	Place	Rival	Match score	Result
2018	Buenos Aires	Croatia women's national beach handball team	2–0	Gold
2019	Rosario	Brazil women's national beach handball team	7-6	Gold
2025	Chengdu	Germany women's national beach handball team	2-1	Gold
