= South and Central American Beach Handball Championship =

Beach Handball Championship

The South and Central American Beach Handball Championship is the official competition for Men's and Women's Beach handball national teams of the South and Central America Handball Confederation.

== Men ==
=== Summary ===
Year	Host	Final			Third place match		
Year	Host	Champion	Score	Runner-up	Third place	Score	Fourth place
2019; Details	(Brazil); Maricá	Brazil	2–0	Uruguay	Argentina	2–0	Paraguay
2022; Details	(Brazil); Maceió	Brazil	2–0	Argentina	Uruguay	2–0	Ecuador
2024; Details	(Paraguay); Asunción	Brazil	2–0	Argentina	Uruguay	2–0	Chile
2026; Details	(Argentina); Rosario	Brazil	2–0	Argentina	Uruguay	2–1	Chile

=== Medal table ===
Rank	Nation	Gold	Silver	Bronze	Total
1	Brazil	4	0	0	4
2	Argentina	0	3	1	4
3	Uruguay	0	1	3	4
Totals (3 entries)		4	4	4	12

=== Participating nations ===
Nation	(Brazil) 2019	(Brazil) 2022	(Paraguay) 2024	(Argentina) 2026	Years
Argentina	3rd	2nd	2nd	2nd	4
Brazil	1st	1st	1st	1st	4
Chile	6th	6th	4th	4th	4
Ecuador	5th	4th			2
Paraguay	4th	5th	5th	5th	4
Peru			6th		1
Uruguay	2nd	3rd	3rd	3rd	4
Total	6	6	6	5	

== Women ==
=== Summary ===
Year	Host	Final			Third place match		
Year	Host	Champion	Score	Runner-up	Third place	Score	Fourth place
2019; Details	(Brazil); Maricá	Brazil	2–0	Argentina	Paraguay	2–1	Uruguay
2022; Details	(Brazil); Maceió	Argentina	2–1	Brazil	Uruguay	2–0	Chile
2024; Details	(Paraguay); Asunción	Brazil	2–0	Argentina	Uruguay	2–0	Paraguay
2026; Details	(Argentina); Rosario	Argentina	2–0	Brazil	Uruguay	2–0	Paraguay

=== Medal table ===
Rank	Nation	Gold	Silver	Bronze	Total
1	Argentina	2	2	0	4
1	Brazil	2	2	0	4
3	Uruguay	0	0	3	3
4	Paraguay	0	0	1	1
Totals (4 entries)		4	4	4	12

=== Participating nations ===
Nation	(Brazil) 2019	(Brazil) 2022	(Paraguay) 2024	(Argentina) 2026	Years
Argentina	2nd	1st	2nd	1st	4
Brazil	1st	2nd	1st	2nd	4
Chile	5th	4th	5th	5th	4
Ecuador		6th			1
Paraguay	3rd	5th	4th	4th	4
Uruguay	4th	3rd	3rd	3rd	4
Total	5	6	6	5	
