= Brazil women's national beach handball team =

Brazil

Information
- Association: Confederação Brasileira de Handebol
- Coach: Vinicius de Oliveira
- Assistant coach: Thais Nascimento

Colours
| Home | Away |

Results

World Games
- Appearances: 5 (First in 2001)
- Best result: Champions (2005, 2013, 2017)

World Championship
- Appearances: 11 (First in 2004)
- Best result: Champions (2006, 2012, 2014)
- Last updated on Unknown.

Brazil women's national beach handball team
Medal record

Representing Brazil

Women's beach handball

World Championships
| Gold medal – first place | 2006 Brazil | Team |
| Gold medal – first place | 2012 Oman | Team |
| Gold medal – first place | 2014 Brazil | Team |
| Silver medal – second place | 2016 Hungary | Team |
| Bronze medal – third place | 2008 Spain | Team |
| Bronze medal – third place | 2010 Turkey | Team |
| Bronze medal – third place | 2018 Russia | Team |

World Games
| Gold medal – first place | 2005 Germany | Team |
| Gold medal – first place | 2013 Colombia | Team |
| Gold medal – first place | 2017 Poland | Team |
| Bronze medal – third place | 2001 Japan | Team |
| Bronze medal – third place | 2009 Taiwan | Team |

World Beach Games
| Bronze medal – third place | 2019 Qatar | Team |

Pan American Championships
| Gold medal – first place | 2008 Uruguay | Team |
| Gold medal – first place | 2012 Uruguay | Team |
| Gold medal – first place | 2013 Argentina | Team |
| Gold medal – first place | 2014 Paraguay | Team |
| Gold medal – first place | 2018 USA | Team |
| Silver medal – second place | 2004 Uruguay | Team |

South & Central American Championships
| Gold medal – first place | 2019 Brazil | Team |
| Gold medal – first place | 2024 Paraguay | Team |
| Silver medal – second place | 2022 Brazil | Team |
| Silver medal – second place | 2026 Argentina | Team |

South American Beach Games
| Gold medal – first place | 2009 Uruguay | Team |
| Gold medal – first place | 2011 Ecuador | Team |
| Gold medal – first place | 2023 Colombia | Team |
| Silver medal – second place | 2019 Argentina | Team |

Brazil women's national beach handball team
Medal record

Women's youth team

Pan American Youth Beach Handball Championship
| Silver medal – second place | 2017 Paraguay | Team |

South and Central American Youth Beach Handball Championship
| Gold medal – first place | 2024 Chile | Team |
| Silver medal – second place | 2022 Argentina | Team |

South American Youth Games
| Silver medal – second place | 2022 Argentina | Team |

The Brazil women's national beach handball team is the national team of Brazil. It is governed by the Confederação Brasileira de Handebol and takes part in international beach handball competitions.

== Results ==
=== World Championships ===
| Year | Position |
|---|---|
| (Egypt) 2004 | 6th place |
| (Brazil) 2006 | 1st place |
| (Spain) 2008 | 3rd place |
| (Turkey) 2010 | 3rd place |
| (Oman) 2012 | 1st place |
| (Brazil) 2014 | 1st place |
| (Hungary) 2016 | 2nd place |
| (Russia) 2018 | 3rd place |
| (Greece) 2022 | 6th place |
| (China) 2024 | 8th place |
| (Croatia) 2026 | 4th place |
| Total | 11/11 |

=== World Games ===
| Year | Position |
|---|---|
| (Japan) 2001 * | 3rd place |
| (Germany) 2005 * | 1st place |
| (Chinese Taipei) 2009 * | 3rd place |
| (Colombia) 2013 | 1st place |
| (Poland) 2017 | 1st place |
| Total | 5/5 |

* invitational sport

=== World Beach Games ===
| Year | Position |
|---|---|
| (Qatar) 2019 | 3rd place |
| Total | 1/1 |
