= Brazil men's national beach handball team =

Brazil

Information
- Association: Confederação Brasileira de Handebol
- Coach: Antonio Guerra
- Assistant coach: Thiago de Almeida

Colours
Home	Away

Results

World Games
- Appearances: 5 (First in 2001)
- Best result: Champions (2009, 2013, 2017)

World Championship
- Appearances: 11 (First in 2004)
- Best result: Champions (2006, 2010, 2012, 2014, 2018)
- Last updated on Unknown.

Brazil men's national beach handball team
Medal record

Men's beach handball

Representing Brazil

World Championships
Gold medal – first place	2006 Brazil	Team
Gold medal – first place	2010 Turkey	Team
Gold medal – first place	2012 Oman	Team
Gold medal – first place	2014 Brazil	Team
Gold medal – first place	2018 Russia	Team
Silver medal – second place	2008 Spain	Team
Silver medal – second place	2016 Hungary	Team
Silver medal – second place	2026 Croatia	Team
Bronze medal – third place	2022 Greece	Team

World Games
Gold medal – first place	2009 Taiwan	Team
Gold medal – first place	2013 Colombia	Team
Gold medal – first place	2017 Poland	Team
Bronze medal – third place	2001 Japan	Team
Bronze medal – third place	2022 USA	Team
Bronze medal – third place	2025 China	Team

World Beach Games
Gold medal – first place	2019 Qatar	Team

Pan American Championships
Gold medal – first place	2004 Uruguay	Team
Gold medal – first place	2008 Uruguay	Team
Gold medal – first place	2012 Uruguay	Team
Gold medal – first place	2013 Argentina	Team
Gold medal – first place	2014 Paraguay	Team
Gold medal – first place	2016 Venezuela	Team
Gold medal – first place	2018 USA	Team

South & Central American Championships
Gold medal – first place	2019 Brazil	Team
Gold medal – first place	2022 Brazil	Team
Gold medal – first place	2024 Paraguay	Team
Gold medal – first place	2026 Argentina	Team

South American Beach Games
Gold medal – first place	2009 Uruguay	Team
Gold medal – first place	2011 Ecuador	Team
Gold medal – first place	2019 Argentina	Team

Brazil men's national beach handball team
Medal record

Men's youth team

Youth Olympic Games
Silver medal – second place	2026 Senegal	Team

Youth World Championships
Silver medal – second place	2022 Greece	Team
Bronze medal – third place	2025 Tunisia	Team

Pan American Youth Beach Handball Championship
Gold medal – first place	2017 Paraguay	Team

South and Central American Youth Beach Handball Championship
Gold medal – first place	2022 Argentina	Team
Silver medal – second place	2024 Chile	Team

South American Youth Games
Silver medal – second place	2022 Argentina	Team

The Brazil national beach handball team is the national team of Brazil. It is governed by the Confederação Brasileira de Handebol and takes part in international beach handball competitions.

== Results ==
=== World Championships ===
Year	Position
(Egypt) 2004	9th place
(Brazil) 2006	1st place
(Spain) 2008	2nd place
(Turkey) 2010	1st place
(Oman) 2012	1st place
(Brazil) 2014	1st place
(Hungary) 2016	2nd place
(Russia) 2018	1st place
(Greece) 2022	3rd place
(China) 2024	6th place
(Croatia) 2026	2nd place
Total	11/11

=== World Games ===
Year	Position
(Japan) 2001*	3rd place
(Germany) 2005*	8th place
(Taiwan) 2009*	1st place
(Colombia) 2013	1st place
(Poland) 2017	1st place
(United States) 2022	3rd place
(China) 2025	3rd place
Total	6/6

* invitational sport

=== World Beach Games ===
Year	Position
(Qatar) 2019	1st place
Total	1/1
