= 2016 Bolivarian Beach Games =

International Multi Beach Sport event

III Bolivarian Beach Games
- Host city: Iquique
- Country: Chile
- Nations: 11
- Athletes: 1,387
- Opening: November 24, 2016
- Closing: December 3, 2016

The 2016 Bolivarian Beach Games, officially the III Bolivarian Beach Games, is an international multi-sport event that was held from 24 November-3 December 2016 in Iquique, Chile. This was the first time Chile hosted an ODEBO event since becoming a member in 2010.

== Host city selection ==
Iquique was selected over Vargas (Venezuela) as the host city in March 2015.

== Sports ==
Thirteen sports will feature in this edition of Bolivarian Beach Games. Canoeing is added from the previous program.

- Beach handball (2)
- Beach rugby (2)
- Beach soccer (1)
- Beach tennis (5)
- Beach volleyball (2)
- Canoeing (20)
- Open water swimming (5)
- Rowing (6)
- Sailing (7)
- Surfing (13)
- Triathlon (5)
- Underwater sports (3)
- Waterskiing (10)

== Participating nations ==
ODEBO Members

- Bolivia
- Chile (Host)
- Colombia
- Ecuador
- Panama
- Peru
- Venezuela

Invited nations

- Dominican Republic
- El Salvador
- Guatemala
- Paraguay

== Medal table ==
Final medal tally

* Host nation (Chile)

Rank	Nation	Gold	Silver	Bronze	Total
1	Chile (CHI)*	31	22	16	69
2	Venezuela (VEN)	16	18	21	55
3	Colombia (COL)	13	11	14	38
4	Ecuador (ECU)	8	14	9	31
5	Peru (PER)	6	6	8	20
6	Guatemala (GUA)	4	2	2	8
7	El Salvador (ESA)	2	1	1	4
8	Dominican Republic (DOM)	1	2	3	6
9	Paraguay (PAR)	0	5	4	9
10	Panama (PAN)	0	0	2	2
Totals (10 entries)		81	81	80	242

== Medalists ==
=== Beach handball ===
Event	Gold	Silver	Bronze
Men	Venezuela; Jesus Barrios; Ali Barranco; Wilmer Bracho; Enmanuel Godoy; Aldreisner Lopez; Victor Lopez; Carlos Martinez; Jhonny Peñaloza; Raul Rodriguez; Ronald Timaure	Paraguay; Yinmy Arturo; Ulises Damian; Jorge Duarte; Javier Fernández; Cesar Frutos; Alvaro Morinigo; Carlos Sandoval; Gustavo Sosa; Oscar Vairoleto; Hector Vazquez	Ecuador; Carlos Carcelen; Jefferson Dominguez; Eddye Gonzalez; Eder Guerrero; Gerdy Litardo; Jimy Loor; Ronald Murillo; Johnny Nieves; Eduardo Quiñonez; Joe Quiñonez
Women	Venezuela; Jackeline Angulo; Maikelly Cedeño; Luz Colina; Nohelyn Gimenez; Frannelly Polanco; Ysbelia Ramírez; Anyi Rodríguez; Ana Maria Sequera; Maria Tovar; Hernairys Vargas	Paraguay; Ana Acuña; Gladys Brusquetti; Marizza Faría; Fatima Lugo; Leticia Martínez; Beatris Penayo; Jennifer Rodríguez; Nilsa Romero; Clara Romina; Alicia Villalba	Colombia; Tatiana Cano; Maria Clara Estrada; Susana Estrada; Deisy Mazo; Maria Isabel Perez; Maria Camila Rodriguez; Joseti Saams; Maribel Serna; Laura Sin; Carolina Uribe

=== Beach rugby ===
Event	Gold	Silver	Bronze
Men	Chile; Sergio Bascuñan; Jorge Castillo; Joaquín Huici; Thomas Orchard; Diego Ramírez; Simon Salinas; Martín Sigren; Ignacio Silva; Martín Vallejos; Martín Verschae	Venezuela; Néstor Aguirre; Ulises Andara; Wilkinson Arrieta; José Gutierrez; Luis Lopez; Alfmarx Marquez; José Piña; José Javier Rojas; Ramón Ruiz; Roberto Schaefer	Paraguay; Sergio Alvarenga; Alvaro Baez; Fabrizio Da Rosa; Pablo Espinola; Leonardo Glizt; Ignacio Murdoch; Juan Ortiz; Antonio Ramos
Women	Colombia; Nicole Acevedo; Catalina Arango; Ana Camacho; Andrea Fernandez; Daniela Hincapie; Carmen Ibarra; Camila Lopera; Angela Lozano; Ruth Lozano; Isabel Romero	Venezuela; Nardelys Alvarado; Moureen Baloa; Daniela Diaz; Cristy Egido; Jetsy Ferrera; Maryoly Gamez; Marianny Izarza; Carla Lanzarote; Mariana Romero; Estefania Salami	Chile; Carolina Alfaro; Nataly Badilla; Daniela Baeza; Alejandra Berrocal; Daniela Corral; Ana María Glucevic; Bárbara Lira; Katarina Restovic; Jacqueline Rilling; Judith Torres

=== Beach soccer ===
Event	Gold	Silver	Bronze
Men	El Salvador; Andres Osorio; Darwin Ramírez; Douglas Zavala; Elías Ramírez; Elmer Robles; Heber Ramos; Herbert Ramos; José Agustín Ruiz; José Portillo; José Batres; Rafael Rizo; Tomás Hernández	Paraguay; Carlos Carballo; Diego Rodriguez; Edgar Barreto; Gustavo Benitez; Ivan Fernandez; Jesus Rolon; Juan Esteban Lopez; Orlando Zayas; Pablo Lopez; Roberto Sanchez; Saul Gonzalez; Sergio Gonzalez	Chile; Alberto Echeverria; Cristian Medalla; Diego Estay; Felipe Díaz; Ignacio Ponce; Kevin Flores; Orlando Echeverria; Pablo Rodriguez; Sebastián Bolívar; Sebastián Vega; Sergio Argote; Victor Belaunde

=== Beach tennis ===
Event	Gold	Silver	Bronze
Men's singles	Ramon Guedez; Venezuela	Jorge Peñalver; Venezuela	Ali Colmenares; Venezuela
Women's singles	Patricia Diaz; Venezuela	Lady Correa; Venezuela	Maria Teresa Salame; Ecuador
Men's doubles	Jorge Peñalver and Ramon Guedez (VEN)	Juan Pablo Ramírez and Marcello Guzmán (CHI)	Leonardo Lapentti and Xavier Viteri (ECU)
Women's doubles	Patricia Diaz and Lady Correa (VEN)	Carolina Lapentti and Janine Guerrero (ECU)	Maria Paz Orellana and Camila Toledo (CHI)
Mixed doubles	Ramon Guedez and Patricia Diaz (VEN)	Ali Colmenares and Lady Correa (VEN)	Maria Paz Orellana and Marcello Guzmán (CHI)

=== Beach volleyball ===
Event	Gold	Silver	Bronze
Men	Chile; Esteban Grimalt; Marco Grimalt	Venezuela; Carlos Rangel; Jonathan Golindano	Paraguay; Edgar Gamarra; José Gaona
Women	Colombia; Andrea Galindo; Claudia Galindo	Venezuela; Gabriela Brito; Norisbeth Agudo	Paraguay; Michelle Valiente; Patricia Caballero

=== Canoeing ===
Event	Gold	Silver	Bronze
Men's C-1 200 m	Michael García; Chile	Andres Lazo; Ecuador	Ronny Ratia; Venezuela
Men's C-1 500 m	Michael García; Chile	Ariel Jimenez; Dominican Republic	Ronny Ratia; Venezuela
Men's C-1 1000 m	Michael García; Chile	Sergio Díaz; Colombia	Ronny Ratia; Venezuela
Men's C-2 200 m	Anahjir Vergara and Victor Vial (CHI)	José Solano and Luis Guerra (VEN)	Daniel Pacheco and Juan Salazar (COL)
Men's C-2 500 m	Anahjir Vergara and Victor Vial (CHI)	Daniel Pacheco and Juan Salazar (COL)	Ariel Jimenez and Lonis Acevedo (DOM)
Men's C-2 1000 m	Anahjir Vergara and Victor Vial (CHI)	Daniel Pacheco and Juan Salazar (COL)	Ariel Jimenez and Lonis Acevedo (DOM)
Men's K-1 200 m	Cristian Guerrero; Dominican Republic	Manuel Chacano; Chile	Antonio Oropeza; Venezuela
Men's K-1 500 m	Edvin Buc; Guatemala	Cristian Guerrero; Dominican Republic	José Giovanni Ramos; Venezuela
Men's K-1 1000 m	Edvin Buc; Guatemala	José Giovanni Ramos; Venezuela	Leocadio Pinto; Colombia
Men's K-2 200 m	José Giovanni Ramos and Antonio Oropeza (VEN)	Edwin Amaya and Yojan Cano (COL)	Jean Valdebenito and Manuel Chacano (CHI)
Men's K-2 1000 m	Gabriel Rodríguez and Joel Gonzalez (VEN)	Edwin Amaya and Yojan Cano (COL)	not awarded
Women's C-1 200 m	Anggie Avegno; Ecuador	Clara Lopez; Guatemala	Manuela Gómez; Colombia
Women's C-1 500 m	Clara Lopez; Guatemala	Diana Paillalef; Chile	Manuela Gómez; Colombia
Women's C-1 1000 m	Clara Lopez; Guatemala	Karen Roco; Chile	Anggie Avegno; Ecuador
Women's K-1 200 m	Ysumy Orellana; Chile	Diexe Molina; Colombia	Maoli Angulo; Ecuador
Women's K-1 500 m	Diexe Molina; Colombia	Maoli Angulo; Ecuador	Goviana Reyes; Chile
Women's K-1 1000 m	Diexe Molina; Colombia	Maoli Angulo; Ecuador	Mara Guerrero; Venezuela
Women's K-2 200 m	Ruth Niño and Tatiana Muñoz (COL)	Jeanarett Valenzuela and Fabiola Zamorano (CHI)	Angelica Jimenez and Mara Guerrero (VEN)
Women's K-2 500 m	Ruth Niño and Tatiana Muñoz (COL)	Mairovi Jaspe and Mara Guerrero (VEN)	Jeanarett Valenzuela and Goviana Reyes (CHI)
Women's K-2 1000 m	Ruth Niño and Tatiana Muñoz (COL)	Jeanarett Valenzuela and Goviana Reyes (CHI)	Angelica Jimenez and Mairovi Jaspe (VEN)

=== Open water swimming ===
Event	Gold	Silver	Bronze
Men's 5 km	Wilder Carreño; Venezuela	David Farinango; Ecuador	Diego Serida; Peru
Men's 10 km	Wilder Carreño; Venezuela	Santiago Enderica; Ecuador	Iván Enderica Ochoa; Ecuador
Women's 5 km	Samantha Arévalo; Ecuador	Paola Perez; Venezuela	Mahina Valdivia; Chile
Women's 10 km	Samantha Arévalo; Ecuador	Nataly Caldas; Ecuador	Ruthseli Aponte; Venezuela
Mixed 3 km	Venezuela	Ecuador	Peru

=== Rowing ===
Event	Gold	Silver	Bronze
Men's single sculls	Eduardo Linares; Peru	Bernardo Guerrero; Chile	Arturo Rivarola; Paraguay
Men's double sculls	Chile; Ignacio Abraham; Óscar Vásquez	Peru; Gianfranco Colmenares; Gonzalo del Solar	Dominican Republic; Jancarlos Tineo; Ignacio Vasquez
Men's coxed quadruple sculls	Peru; Johann Hamann; Eduardo Linares; Cristhofer Rojas; Alvaro Torres; Franco Yrivarren	Chile; Alfredo Abraham; Sebastian Colpihueque; Fabian Oyarzún; Dangelo Salamanca; Luis Saumann	Ecuador; Santiago Cali; Juan Galeas; Walter Guala; Alan Sola; Cristhian Sola
Women's single sculls	Antonia Abraham; Chile	Mariagnes Valdez; Paraguay	Ana Cristina Salinas; Peru
Women's double sculls	Chile; Melita Abraham; Josefa Vila	Peru; Arantza Valera; Camila Valle	Venezuela; Dayana Escalona; Rosmary Lopez
Women's coxed quadruple sculls	Chile; Antonia Abraham; Melita Abraham; Christina Hostetter; Victoria Hostetter	Peru; Pamela Noya; Ana Cristina Salinas; Arantza Valera; Camila Valle	Venezuela; Marthulis Buriel; Yuliannis Buriel; Royna Guerra; Yoselin Izaze; Maria Lopez

=== Sailing ===
Event	Gold	Silver	Bronze
Men's RS:X	Daniel Flores; Venezuela	Santiago Bazo; Peru	Eduardo Herman; Chile
Men's Laser Standard	Matías del Solar; Chile	Gabriel Sanz-Agero; Guatemala	José Gutiérrez; Venezuela
Men's Sunfish	Angello Giuria; Peru	Clemente Seguel; Chile	David Gonzalez; Venezuela
Women's Laser Radial	Maria José Poncell; Chile	Daniela Rivera; Venezuela	Andrea Aldana; Guatemala
Women's Sunfish	Diana Tudela; Peru	Romina de Iulio; Ecuador	Kassya Marin; Venezuela
Optimist	Stefano Viale; Peru	Dante Parodi; Chile	Simón Gómez; Colombia
Snipe	Antonio Poncell and Millaray Briceño (CHI)	Alejandro Zapata and Fernando Correa (PER)	Carlos Aguirre and David Gonzalez (VEN)

=== Surfing ===
Event	Gold	Silver	Bronze
Aloha Cup	Chile; Lorena Fica; Miguel Maturana; Guillermo Satt; Manuel Selman	Ecuador; Dominic Barona; Israel Barona; Isidro Villao; Jonathan Zambrano	Venezuela; Jesus Garcia; Derek Gomes; Laura Petitts; Ronald Reyes
Men's bodyboard drop knee	Michel Copetta; Chile	José Rodriguez; Peru	Luis Rodriguez; Venezuela
Men's open bodyboard	Matias Díaz; Chile	Gabriel Brantes; Chile	Jorge Hurtado; Peru
Men's open longboard	Ronald Reyes; Venezuela	Belko Suárez; Chile	Amado Alvarado; El Salvador
Men's open shortboard	Derek Gomes; Venezuela	Jonathan Zambrano; Ecuador	Manuel Selman; Chile
Men's prone race	Nicolas Undurraga; Chile	Amado Alvarado; El Salvador	Ever Rivera; Guatemala
Men's SUP race	Carlos Gomez; Ecuador	José Suazo; Chile	Camilo Marmol; Colombia
Men's SUP surf	Carlos Gomez; Ecuador	Francisco Hernandez; Venezuela	Miguel Hernandez; Chile
Women's open bodyboard	Anais Velis; Chile	Izamar Vivas; Venezuela	Carolina Boteri; Peru
Women's open longboard	Constanza Fernandez; Chile	Trinidad Segura; Chile	Esperanza Subero; Venezuela
Women's open shortboard	Dominic Barona; Ecuador	Jessica Anderson; Chile	Lorena Fica; Chile
Women's SUP race	Edimar Luque; Venezuela	Lisette Prado; Ecuador	Cristine Kelso; Panama
Women's SUP surf	Josselyn Alabi; El Salvador	Viadana Arza; Venezuela	Cristine Kelso; Panama

=== Triathlon ===
Event	Gold	Silver	Bronze
Men's sprint	Brian Moya; Colombia	Martin Ulloa; Chile	Luis Barraza; Chile
Men's pair	Diego Moya and Martin Ulloa (CHI)	Yhousman Perdomo and José Amaya (VEN)	Andres Cabascango and Ramon Matute (ECU)
Women's sprint	Elizabeth Bravo; Ecuador	Lina Maria Raga; Colombia	Macarena Salazar; Chile
Women's pair	Elizabeth Bravo and Steffy Salazar (ECU)	Macarena Salazar and Catalina Salazar (CHI)	Lina Maria Raga and Pamela Holguin (COL)
Mixed relay	Chile; Diego Moya; Catalina Salazar; Macarena Salazar; Martin Ulloa	Ecuador; Elizabeth Bravo; Andres Cabascango; Ramon Matute; Steffy Salazar	Colombia; Pamela Holguin; Brian Moya; Lina Maria Raga; Juan Sebastian Rubio

=== Underwater sports ===
Event	Gold	Silver	Bronze
Men's 5 km finswimming	Andres Hernandez; Colombia	Julio Gonzales; Venezuela	Yeferson Valencia; Venezuela
Women's 4 km finswimming	Paulina Gomez; Colombia	Maria Clara Lopera; Colombia	Martina Garcias; Venezuela
Men's spearfishing	Chile; Claudio Valle; Franco Bosquez; Miguel Ángel Soto	Venezuela; Alexander Ortega; Gabriel Acosta; Rainer Mendez; Ricardo Ferrebus	Peru; Mario Espinoza; Ricardo Yupanqui; Victor Carbajal

=== Water skiing ===
Event	Gold	Silver	Bronze
Men's overall	Felipe Miranda; Chile	Rodrigo Miranda; Chile	Roberto Linares; Colombia
Men's jumping	Felipe Miranda; Chile	Rodrigo Miranda; Chile	Roberto Linares; Colombia
Men's slalom	Felipe Miranda; Chile	Rodrigo Miranda; Chile	José Tejada; Peru
Men's trick	Felipe Miranda; Chile	Rodrigo Miranda; Chile	Roberto Linares; Colombia
Men's wakeboard	Jorge Rocha; Colombia	Jamie Bazan; Ecuador	José Boisset; Chile
Women's overall	Daniela Verswyvel; Colombia	Silvia Zarrate; Colombia	Andrea Tejada; Peru
Women's jumping	Andrea Tejada; Peru	Amalia Gallego; Colombia	Daniela Verswyvel; Colombia
Women's slalom	Josefa González; Chile	Silvia Zarrate; Colombia	Dominga González; Chile
Women's trick	Josefa González; Chile	Dominga González; Chile	Daniela Verswyvel; Colombia
Women's wakeboard	Laura Madriñan; Colombia	Ana Cristina Díaz; Paraguay	Manuela Castro; Ecuador
