= Beach handball at the 2023 South American Beach Games =

Beach Handball at the 2023 South American Beach Games
- Venue: El Rodadero beach
- Location: (Colombia) Santa Marta
- Dates: 14 – 17 July
- Nations: 9
- Teams: 9 (men); 7 (women)

Beach Handball competition of the 2023 South American Beach Games in Santa Marta were held from 14 to 17 July at the Rodadero beach.

== Participating teams ==
Men

- Argentina
- Brazil
- Chile
- Colombia
- Ecuador
- Paraguay
- Peru
- Uruguay
- Venezuela

Women

- Argentina
- Brazil
- Chile
- Colombia
- Paraguay
- Uruguay
- Venezuela

== Medal summary ==
=== Medal table ===
| Rank | Nation | Gold | Silver | Bronze | Total |
|---|---|---|---|---|---|
| 1 | Uruguay (URU) | 1 | 0 | 1 | 2 |
| 2 | Brazil (BRA) | 1 | 0 | 0 | 1 |
| 3 | Argentina (ARG) | 0 | 2 | 0 | 2 |
| 4 | Chile (CHI) | 0 | 0 | 1 | 1 |
| Totals (4 entries) | | 2 | 2 | 2 | 6 |

=== Medalists ===
| Event | Gold | Silver | Bronze |
|---|---|---|---|
| Men's tournament | Uruguay; Andres Carlos Miranda; Mauricio Gallo Besio; Richard Daniel Bica; Santiago Rodriguez Mayado; Francisco Gallo Gómez; Mauricio Santiago Garateguy; Rodrigo Damian Perez; Sebastian Sagasti Trias | Argentina; Francisco Nuñez Müller; Jose Augusto Basualdo; Nicolas Ezequiel Millet; Santiago Vidondo; Jorge Nahuel Perez; Lucas Matias Coronel; Nicolas Vella; Santino Sposito | Chile; Benjamin Tomas Valdivia; Ignacio Esteban Soto; Lucas Matías Pacheco; Mauro Andree Rosso; Hanson Jonathan Lin; Juan Pablo Rubio; Matias Ignacio Veneros; Sebastián Alejandro Aravena |
| Women's tournament | Brazil; Ana Caroline Gomes; Beatriz Correia Gomes; Lorena Cavalcanti Engler; Patricia Scheppa; Arianne Demetrio Florindo; Carolina Pires Militao; Mariane Guimaraes Hanthequeste; Renata Da Silva Santiago | Argentina; Alma Jazmín Molina; Gisella Julieta Bonomi; Lucila Candela Balsas; Maria Florencia Gallo; Camila Agostina Arcajo; Giuliana Gamba; Maria Florencia Bericio; Zoe Turnes | Uruguay; Camila Palomeque Tato; Florencia Lachaise Atto; Mikaela Feher Copes; Sofia Maria Giani; Cecilia Pedetti Sanjurjo; Maria Valentina Garcia; Romina Boschiero Mari; Sofia Suarez Gonzalez |

== Men's tournament ==
=== Group A ===
| Pos | Team | Pld | W | L | SW | SL | Pts |
|---|---|---|---|---|---|---|---|
| 1 | Argentina | 4 | 4 | 0 | 8 | 0 | 8 |
| 2 | Chile | 4 | 3 | 1 | 6 | 4 | 6 |
| 3 | Brazil | 4 | 2 | 2 | 5 | 4 | 4 |
| 4 | Colombia | 4 | 1 | 3 | 3 | 6 | 2 |
| 5 | Peru | 4 | 0 | 3 | 0 | 6 | 0 |

| Team 1 | Score | Team 2 |
14 July 2023
14:00
| Peru | 0–2 | Chile |
| Colombia | 0–2 | Brazil |
15 July 2023
9:00
| Chile | 2–1 | Colombia |
| Argentina | 2–0 | Brazil |
16:00
| Argentina | 2–0 | Colombia |
| Brazil | 2–0 | Peru |
16 July 2023
10:00
| Colombia | 2–0 | Peru |
| Chile | 0–2 | Argentina |
15:00
| Argentina | 2–0 | Peru |
| Brazil | 1–2 | Chile |

=== Group B ===
| Pos | Team | Pld | W | L | SW | SL | Pts |
|---|---|---|---|---|---|---|---|
| 1 | Uruguay | 3 | 3 | 0 | 6 | 1 | 6 |
| 2 | Venezuela | 3 | 2 | 1 | 5 | 3 | 4 |
| 3 | Paraguay | 3 | 1 | 2 | 2 | 4 | 2 |
| 4 | Ecuador | 3 | 0 | 3 | 1 | 6 | 0 |

| Team 1 | Score | Team 2 |
15 July 2023
15:00
| Paraguay | 0–2 | Uruguay |
| Venezuela | 2–1 | Ecuador |
16 July 2023
11:00
| Paraguay | 0–2 | Venezuela |
| Uruguay | 2–0 | Ecuador |
16:00
| Ecuador | 0–2 | Paraguay |
| Venezuela | 1–2 | Uruguay |

== Knockout stage ==
=== Bracket ===
Semifinals
17 July
Argentina | 2
Venezuela | 1
17 July
Uruguay | 2
Chile | 0

Final
17 July
Argentina | 0
Uruguay | 2
Third place
17 July
Chile | 2
Venezuela | 0

| Team 1 | Score | Team 2 |
5th place game
17 July 2023
11:00
| Brazil | 2–0 | Paraguay |
7th place game
17 July 2023
8:00
| Colombia | 1–2 | Ecuador |

=== Final ranking ===
| Rank | Team |
|---|---|
| 1st place, gold medalist(s) | Uruguay |
| 2nd place, silver medalist(s) | Argentina |
| 3rd place, bronze medalist(s) | Chile |
| 4 | Venezuela |
| 5 | Brazil |
| 6 | Paraguay |
| 7 | Ecuador |
| 8 | Colombia |
| 9 | Peru |

== Women's tournament ==
=== Group A ===
| Pos | Team | Pld | W | L | SW | SL | Pts |
|---|---|---|---|---|---|---|---|
| 1 | Argentina | 2 | 2 | 0 | 4 | 0 | 4 |
| 2 | Venezuela | 2 | 1 | 1 | 2 | 2 | 2 |
| 3 | Chile | 2 | 0 | 2 | 0 | 4 | 0 |

| Team 1 | Score | Team 2 |
15 July 2023
11:00
| Chile | 0–2 | Argentina |
16 July 2023
9:00
| Venezuela | 2–0 | Chile |
17:00
| Argentina | 2–0 | Venezuela |

=== Group B ===
| Pos | Team | Pld | W | L | SW | SL | Pts |
|---|---|---|---|---|---|---|---|
| 1 | Brazil | 3 | 3 | 0 | 6 | 1 | 6 |
| 2 | Uruguay | 3 | 2 | 1 | 5 | 3 | 4 |
| 3 | Paraguay | 3 | 1 | 2 | 2 | 4 | 2 |
| 3 | Colombia | 3 | 0 | 3 | 1 | 6 | 0 |

| Team 1 | Score | Team 2 |
14 July 2023
15:00
| Uruguay | 1–2 | Brazil |
| Paraguay | 2–0 | Colombia |
15 July 2023
10:00
| Uruguay | 2–0 | Paraguay |
| Brazil | 2–0 | Colombia |
16 July 2023
14:00
| Colombia | 1–2 | Uruguay |
| Brazil | 2–0 | Paraguay |

== Knockout stage ==
=== Bracket ===
Semifinals
17 July
Argentina | 2
Uruguay | 1
17 July
Brazil | 2
Venezuela | 0

Final
17 July
Argentina | 1
Brazil | 2
Third place
17 July
Uruguay | 2
Venezuela | 1

=== 5th-place game ===
| Team 1 | Score | Team 2 |
17 July 2023
8:00
| Chile | 1–2 | Paraguay |

=== Final ranking ===
| Rank | Team |
|---|---|
| 1st place, gold medalist(s) | Brazil |
| 2nd place, silver medalist(s) | Argentina |
| 3rd place, bronze medalist(s) | Uruguay |
| 4 | Venezuela |
| 5 | Paraguay |
| 6 | Chile |
| 7 | Colombia |
