= Beach handball at the Bolivarian Beach Games =

Beach Handball has been a Bolivarian Beach Games event since 2012 in Lima, Peru.

== Men ==
=== Summary ===
Year	Host	Final			Third place match		
Year	Host	Champion	Score	Runner-up	Third place	Score	Fourth place
2012; Details	(Peru); Lima	Venezuela	2–1	Ecuador	Colombia	2–0	Paraguay
2014; Details	(Peru); Huanchaco	Venezuela	2–0	Ecuador	Colombia	2–0	Peru
2016; Details	(Chile); Iquique	Venezuela	2–1	Paraguay	Ecuador	2–0	Chile

=== Medal table ===
Rank	Nation	Gold	Silver	Bronze	Total
1	Venezuela	3	0	0	3
2	Ecuador	0	2	1	3
3	Paraguay	0	1	0	1
4	Colombia	0	0	2	2
Totals (4 entries)		3	3	3	9

=== Participating nations ===
Nation	(Peru) 2012	(Peru) 2014	(Chile) 2016	Years
Chile	-	5th	4th	2
Colombia	3rd	3rd	5th	3
Ecuador	2nd	2nd	3rd	3
El Salvador	6th	-	-	1
Paraguay	4th	-	2nd	2
Peru	5th	4th	6th	3
Venezuela	1st	1st	1st	3
Total	6	5	6	

== Women ==
=== Summary ===
Year	Host	Final			Third place match		
Year	Host	Champion	Score	Runner-up	Third place	Score	Fourth place
2012; Details	(Peru); Lima	Venezuela	2–0	Colombia	Paraguay	2–1	Dominican Republic
2014; Details	(Peru); Huanchaco	Venezuela	No playoffs	Paraguay	Colombia	No playoffs	Ecuador
2016; Details	(Chile); Iquique	Venezuela	2–1	Paraguay	Colombia	2–0	Chile

=== Medal table ===
Rank	Nation	Gold	Silver	Bronze	Total
1	Venezuela	3	0	0	3
2	Paraguay	0	2	1	3
3	Colombia	0	1	2	3
Totals (3 entries)		3	3	3	9

=== Participating nations ===
Nation	(Peru) 2012	(Peru) 2014	(Chile) 2016	Years
Chile	-	5th	4th	2
Colombia	2nd	3rd	3rd	3
Dominican Republic	4th	-	-	1
Ecuador	5th	4th	-	2
Guatemala	6th	-	-	1
Paraguay	3rd	2nd	2nd	3
Peru	7th	6th	5th	3
Venezuela	1st	1st	1st	3
Total	7	6	5	
