= Beach handball at the 2022 South American Youth Games =

Beach Handball at the 2022 South American Youth Games
- Venue: Arena La Rural
- Location: (Argentina) Rosario
- Dates: 5 – 8 May
- Nations: 8
- Teams: 7 (men); 5 (women)

Beach Handball competition of the 2022 South American Youth Games in Rosario were held from 5 to 8 May at the Arena La Rural.

== Participating teams ==
Men

- Argentina
- Brazil
- Colombia
- Ecuador
- Paraguay
- Peru
- Venezuela

Women

- Argentina
- Brazil
- Paraguay
- Uruguay
- Venezuela

== Medal summary ==
Event	Gold	Silver	Bronze
Boys' tournament	Argentina; Giovanni Brunetta; Facundo Dolce; Juan Federico Gull; Joaquín Mauch; Juan Manuel Ramirez; Ezequiel Rozitchner; Facundo Sanchez; Valentin Zocco	Brazil; Joao Antonio Evangelista; Kaike Batista; Kaua Da Silva; Ricardo Duarte; Joao Freitas; Morigi Matheus; Gustavo Morais; Pedro Santana	Venezuela; Alejandro Aparicio; Julio Garcia; Jesus Hernandez; Samuel Pacheco; Daniel Peña; Jose Salazar; Carlos Suarez; Wilmer Toledo
Girls' tournament	Argentina; Magali Alfredi; Camila Arcajo; Maria Florencia Gallo; Selena Maitini; Juana Medina; Alma Molina; Maria Constanza Suarez; Johanna Ursino	Brazil; Maria Fernanda Barbosa; Julia Gomes; Thais Petrucci; Leticia Costa; Livia Mussatto; Mariana Rocco; Lavinia Soares; Beatriz Spena	Uruguay; Giuliana Caligari; Maria Federica Duran; Victoria Liguori; Maria Mercedes Ogando; Clementina Piñeyro; Maria Josefina Rabosto; Ainara Sagardoy; Maia Sena

== Men's tournament ==
=== Group A ===
Pos	Team	Pld	W	L	SW	SL	Pts
1	Brazil	2	2	0	4	0	4
2	Venezuela	2	1	1	2	2	2
3	Colombia	2	0	2	0	4	0

Team 1	Score	Team 2
5 May 2022
11:00
Brazil	2–0	Colombia
6 May 2022
11:00
Colombia	0–2	Venezuela
16:00
Brazil	2–0	Venezuela

=== Group B ===
Pos	Team	Pld	W	L	SW	SL	Pts
1	Argentina	3	3	0	6	0	6
2	Paraguay	3	2	1	4	2	4
3	Ecuador	3	1	2	2	5	2
4	Peru	3	0	3	1	6	0

Team 1	Score	Team 2
5 May 2022
10:00
Argentina	2–0	Ecuador
Paraguay	2–0	Peru
16:00
Peru	0–2	Argentina
Ecuador	0–2	Paraguay
6 May 2022
10:00
Argentina	2–0	Paraguay
Ecuador	2–1	Peru

== Knockout stage ==
=== Bracket ===
Semifinals
7 May
Argentina	2
Venezuela	1
7 May
Brazil	2
Paraguay	0

Final
8 May
Argentina	2
Brazil	1
Third place
8 May
Venezuela	2
Paraguay	1

=== Placement round ===
Pos	Team	Pld	W	L	SW	SL	Pts
5	Ecuador	2	2	0	4	1	4
6	Peru	2	1	1	2	3	2
7	Colombia	2	0	2	2	4	0

Team 1	Score	Team 2
7 May 2022
10:00
Colombia	1–2	Peru
17:00
Peru	0–2	Ecuador
8 May 2022
09:00
Colombia	1-2	Ecuador

=== Final ranking ===
Rank	Team
1st place, gold medalist(s)	Argentina
2nd place, silver medalist(s)	Brazil
3rd place, bronze medalist(s)	Venezuela
4	Paraguay
5	Ecuador
6	Peru
7	Colombia

== Women's tournament ==
=== Group A ===
Pos	Team	Pld	W	L	SW	SL	Pts
1	Argentina	4	4	0	8	0	8
2	Brazil	4	3	1	6	2	6
3	Paraguay	4	2	2	4	5	4
4	Uruguay	4	1	3	3	6	2
5	Venezuela	4	0	4	0	8	0

Team 1	Score	Team 2
5 May 2022
09:00
Paraguay	0–2	Argentina
Venezuela	0–2	Uruguay
15:00
Argentina	2–0	Venezuela
Paraguay	0–2	Brazil
6 May 2022
09:00
Venezuela	0–2	Paraguay
Brazil	2–0	Uruguay
15:00
Uruguay	0–2	Argentina
Brazil	2–0	Venezuela
7 May 2022
09:00
Argentina	2–0	Brazil
Uruguay	1–2	Paraguay

== Knockout stage ==
=== Bracket ===
Semifinals
7 May
Argentina	2
Uruguay	0
7 May
Brazil	2
Paraguay	0

Final
8 May
Argentina	2
Brazil	0
Third place
8 May
Uruguay	2
Paraguay	1

=== Final ranking ===
Rank	Team
1st place, gold medalist(s)	Argentina
2nd place, silver medalist(s)	Brazil
3rd place, bronze medalist(s)	Uruguay
4	Paraguay
5	Venezuela
