= 2024 South and Central American Beach Handball Championship =

Tournament details
- Host country: Paraguay
- Venue(s): 1 (in 1 host city)
- Dates: 10–13 April
- Teams: 11 (from 1 confederation)

Final positions
- Champions: Brazil (men); Brazil (women)
- Runner-up: Argentina (men); Argentina (women)
- Third place: Uruguay (men); Uruguay (women)
- Fourth place: Chile (men); Paraguay (women)

The 2024 South and Central American Beach Handball Championship was the second edition of the tournament, took place in Asunción, Paraguay from 10 to 13 April 2024. It acted as the South and Central American qualifying tournament for the 2024 Beach Handball World Championships.

== Participating teams ==
Men

- Argentina
- Brazil
- Chile
- Paraguay
- Peru
- Uruguay

Women

- Argentina
- Brazil
- Chile
- Paraguay
- Uruguay

== Men's tournament ==
=== Qualification round ===
| Pos | Team | Pld | W | L | GF | GA | Pts |
|---|---|---|---|---|---|---|---|
| 1 | Brazil | 5 | 5 | 0 | 216 | 113 | 10 |
| 2 | Argentina | 5 | 4 | 1 | 187 | 167 | 8 |
| 3 | Uruguay | 5 | 3 | 2 | 182 | 156 | 6 |
| 4 | Chile | 5 | 2 | 3 | 157 | 167 | 4 |
| 5 | Paraguay | 5 | 1 | 4 | 136 | 169 | 2 |
| 6 | Peru | 5 | 0 | 5 | 101 | 214 | 0 |

| Team 1 | Score | Team 2 |
10 April 2024
09:30
| Brazil | 2–0 | Paraguay |
10:15
| Uruguay | 2–0 | Chile |
11:00
| Argentina | 2–0 | Peru |
16:30
| Peru | 0–2 | Uruguay |
17:15
| Chile | 0–2 | Brazil |
18:00
| Paraguay | 0–2 | Argentina |
11 April 2024
09:30
| Brazil | 2–0 | Peru |
10:15
| Paraguay | 0–2 | Chile |
11:00
| Uruguay | 1–2 | Argentina |
16:30
| Uruguay | 0–2 | Brazil |
17:15
| Peru | 1–2 | Paraguay |
18:00
| Argentina | 2–1 | Chile |
12 April 2024
09:30
| Chile | 2–0 | Peru |
10:15
| Uruguay | 2–0 | Paraguay |
11:00
| Brazil | 2–0 | Argentina |

== Knockout stage ==
| Team 1 | Score | Team 2 |
13 April 2024
Gold medal match
11:00
| Brazil | 2–0 | Argentina |
Bronze medal match
09:30
| Uruguay | 2–0 | Chile |
5th place match
08:00
| Paraguay | 2–0 | Peru |

=== Final ranking ===
| Rank | Team |
|---|---|
| 1st place, gold medalist(s) | Brazil |
| 2nd place, silver medalist(s) | Argentina |
| 3rd place, bronze medalist(s) | Uruguay |
| 4 | Chile |
| 5 | Paraguay |
| 6 | Peru |

| Team qualified to the 2024 Men's Beach Handball World Championships |

== Women's tournament ==
=== Qualification round ===
| Pos | Team | Pld | W | L | GF | GA | Pts |
|---|---|---|---|---|---|---|---|
| 1 | Argentina | 4 | 4 | 0 | 165 | 107 | 8 |
| 2 | Brazil | 4 | 3 | 1 | 158 | 107 | 6 |
| 3 | Paraguay | 4 | 2 | 2 | 121 | 147 | 4 |
| 4 | Uruguay | 4 | 1 | 3 | 123 | 138 | 2 |
| 5 | Chile | 4 | 0 | 4 | 109 | 177 | 0 |

| Team 1 | Score | Team 2 |
10 April 2024
08:00
| Paraguay | 2–1 | Uruguay |
08:45
| Chile | 0–2 | Argentina |
15:00
| Argentina | 2–0 | Paraguay |
15:45
| Chile | 0–2 | Brazil |
11 April 2024
08:00
| Paraguay | 2–1 | Chile |
08:45
| Brazil | 2–0 | Uruguay |
15:00
| Brazil | 2–0 | Paraguay |
15:45
| Uruguay | 0–2 | Argentina |
12 April 2024
08:00
| Uruguay | 2–0 | Chile |
08:45
| Argentina | 2–1 | Brazil |

== Knockout stage ==
| Team 1 | Score | Team 2 |
13 April 2024
Gold medal match
10:15
| Argentina | 0–2 | Brazil |
Bronze medal match
08:45
| Paraguay | 0–2 | Uruguay |

=== Final ranking ===
| Rank | Team |
|---|---|
| 1st place, gold medalist(s) | Brazil |
| 2nd place, silver medalist(s) | Argentina |
| 3rd place, bronze medalist(s) | Uruguay |
| 4 | Paraguay |
| 5 | Chile |

| Team qualified to the 2024 Women's Beach Handball World Championships |
