= Beach handball at the 2019 World Beach Games – Men's tournament =

2019 Beach handball at the 2019 World Beach Games
Tournament details
- Host country: Qatar
- Venue(s): 1 (in 1 host city)
- Dates: 11–16 October
- Teams: 12 (from 5 confederations)

Final positions
- Champions: Brazil
- Runners-up: Spain
- Third place: Sweden
- Fourth place: Qatar

The 2019 Men's Beach handball at the World Beach Games will be the first edition of the tournament, held at Doha, Qatar from 11 to 16 October 2019.

== Qualification ==
Mean of qualification	Date	Host	Vacancies	Qualified
Host nation	14 June 2019	(Switzerland) Lausanne	1	Qatar
2018 World Championship	24–29 July 2018	(Russia) Kazan	5	Brazil Croatia Hungary Sweden Spain
2019 Oceania Beach Handball Championship	21–24 February 2019	(Australia) Glenelg	1	Australia
2019 North American and the Caribbean Beach Handball Championship	11–14 June 2019	(Trinidad and Tobago) Port of Spain	1	United States
2019 South and Central American Championship	11–14 June 2019	(Brazil) Rio de Janeiro	1	Uruguay
2019 African Beach Games	14–16 June 2019	(Cape Verde) Sal	1	Tunisia
2019 Asian Championship	15–22 June 2019	(China) Weihai	1	Oman
2019 European Championship	2–7 July 2019	(Poland) Stare Jabłonki	1	Denmark
Total			12	

== Draw ==
The draw was held on 27 August 2019 at Doha, Qatar.

== Preliminary round ==
All times are local (UTC+3).

=== Group A ===
Pos	Team	Pld	W	L	Pts	SW	SL	SR	SPW	SPL	SPR	Qualification
1	Denmark	5	5	0	10	10	0	MAX	199	171	1.164	Quarter finals
2	Brazil	5	4	1	8	8	2	4.000	211	156	1.353	Quarter finals
3	Sweden	5	3	2	6	6	4	1.500	188	169	1.112	Quarter finals
4	Australia	5	2	3	4	4	8	0.500	178	242	0.736	Quarter finals
5	United States	5	1	4	2	3	8	0.375	207	218	0.950	9-12th Place Semifinals
6	Oman	5	0	5	0	1	10	0.100	148	185	0.800	9-12th Place Semifinals

Source: Table
Rules for classification: 1) Points; 2) Head-to-head points; 3) Head-to-head set difference; 4) Head-to-head points won; 5) Set difference; 6) Points won; 7) Draw.

=== Group B ===
Pos	Team	Pld	W	L	Pts	SW	SL	SR	SPW	SPL	SPR	Qualification
1	Qatar	5	5	0	10	10	2	5.000	190	163	1.166	Quarter finals
2	Hungary	5	3	2	6	8	4	2.000	205	183	1.120	Quarter finals
3	Croatia	5	3	2	6	7	5	1.400	211	203	1.039	Quarter finals
4	Spain	5	2	3	4	5	6	0.833	189	189	1.000	Quarter finals
5	Tunisia	5	1	4	2	2	9	0.222	139	178	0.781	9-12th Place Semifinals
6	Uruguay	5	1	4	2	3	9	0.333	174	191	0.911	9-12th Place Semifinals

Source: Table
Rules for classification: 1) Points; 2) Head-to-head points; 3) Head-to-head set difference; 4) Head-to-head points won; 5) Set difference; 6) Points won; 7) Draw.

== Knockout stage ==
=== Championship bracket ===
Quarterfinals
A1	Denmark	17	24
B4	Spain	20	30
A3	Sweden	17	22	7
B2	Hungary	19	20	4
A2	Brazil	30	16	6
B3	Croatia	20	17	4
A4	Australia	17	14
B1	Qatar	24	21

Semifinals
B4	Spain	22	16	9
A3	Sweden	20	17	8
A2	Brazil	15	10	7
B1	Qatar	14	14	4

Finals
B4	Spain	17	18	10
A2	Brazil	14	19	11
Third place
A3	Sweden	10	21	9
B1	Qatar	16	16	6

=== 5–8th place bracket ===
5–8th place semifinals
A1	Denmark	22	16	4
B2	Hungary	18	18	7
B3	Croatia	21	35
A4	Australia	20	26

Fifth place game
B2	Hungary	20	26	10
B3	Croatia	29	22	11
Seventh place game
A1	Denmark	16	28	16
A4	Australia	19	21	14

=== 9–12th place bracket ===
9–12th place semifinals
A5	United States	16	23	4
B6	Uruguay	21	22	7
A6	Oman	18	20	4
B5	Tunisia	16	21	5

Ninth place game
B6	Uruguay	22	16	2
B5	Tunisia	19	19	5
Eleventh place game
A5	United States	24	25
A6	Oman	20	24

== Final ranking ==
Rank	Team
1st place, gold medalist(s)	Brazil
2nd place, silver medalist(s)	Spain
3rd place, bronze medalist(s)	Sweden
4	Qatar
5	Croatia
6	Hungary
7	Denmark
8	Australia
9	Tunisia
10	Uruguay
11	United States
12	Oman
