= Beach handball at the 2017 World Games =

- The pictogram of Beach handball.
- Venue: P5 Complex
- Dates: 26–29 July 2017
- Competitors: 162 from 13 nations

The beach handball tournaments at the 2017 World Games in Wrocław was played between 26 and 29 July. 82 beach handball competitors, from 11 nations, participated in the tournament. The beach handball competition took place at P5 Complex in east cluster.

== Qualification ==
=== Men's tournament ===
Means of qualification	Date	Venue	Vacancies	Qualified
Host country	—	(Switzerland) Basel	1	Poland
African Qualifliers	12–17 July 2016	(Hungary) Budapest	1	Egypt
Americans Qualifliers	12–17 July 2016	(Hungary) Budapest	2	Brazil
Americans Qualifliers	12–17 July 2016	(Hungary) Budapest	2	Uruguay
Asian Qualifliers	12–17 July 2016	(Hungary) Budapest	1	Qatar
European Qualifliers	12–17 July 2016	(Hungary) Budapest	2	Croatia
European Qualifliers	12–17 July 2016	(Hungary) Budapest	2	Hungary
Oceanian Qualifliers	12–17 July 2016	(Hungary) Budapest	1	Australia
Total			8	

=== Women's tournament ===
Means of qualification	Date	Venue	Vacancies	Qualified
Host country	—	(Switzerland) Basel	1	Poland
African Qualifliers	12–17 July 2016	(Hungary) Budapest	1	Tunisia
Americans Qualifliers	12–17 July 2016	(Hungary) Budapest	2	Brazil
Americans Qualifliers	12–17 July 2016	(Hungary) Budapest	2	Argentina
Asian Qualifliers	12–17 July 2016	(Hungary) Budapest	1	Chinese Taipei
European Qualifliers	12–17 July 2016	(Hungary) Budapest	2	Spain
European Qualifliers	12–17 July 2016	(Hungary) Budapest	2	Norway
Oceanian Qualifliers	12–17 July 2016	(Hungary) Budapest	1	Australia
Total			8	

== Schedule ==
G	Group stage	¼	Quarter-finals	½	Semi-finals	B	Bronze medal match	F	Final

Date Event	Wed 26	Thu 27	Fri 28		Sat 29	
Men	G	G	¼	½	B	F
Women	G	G	¼	½	B	F

== Men's tournament ==
=== Group A ===
Pos	Team	Pld	W	L	SW	SL	Pts
1	Hungary	3	3	0	6	1	6
2	Croatia	3	2	1	5	2	4
3	Poland	3	1	2	2	4	2
4	Egypt	3	0	3	0	6	0

=== Group B ===
Pos	Team	Pld	W	L	SW	SL	Pts
1	Qatar	3	3	0	6	1	6
2	Brazil	3	2	1	5	2	4
3	Australia	3	1	2	2	4	2
4	Uruguay	3	0	3	0	6	0

=== Knockout stage ===
Quarter-finals
28 July
Hungary	2
Uruguay	0
28 July
Poland	0
Brazil	2
28 July
Australia	0
Croatia	2
28 July
Qatar	2
Egypt	0

Semi-finals
28 July
Hungary	0
Brazil	2
28 July
Croatia	2
Qatar	1

Gold medal
29 July
Brazil	2
Croatia	1
Bronze medal
29 July
Hungary	1
Qatar	2

==== 5th–8th place play-offs ====
Semi-finals
28 July
Uruguay	2
Poland	0
28 July
Australia	2
Egypt	0

Fifth place
29 July
Uruguay	2
Australia	0
Seventh place
29 July
Poland	2
Egypt	0

=== Final ranking ===
Rank	Team
1st place, gold medalist(s)	Brazil
2nd place, silver medalist(s)	Croatia
3rd place, bronze medalist(s)	Qatar
4	Hungary
5	Uruguay
6	Australia
7	Poland
8	Egypt

== Women's tournament ==
=== Group A ===
Pos	Team	Pld	W	L	SW	SL	Pts
1	Norway	3	3	0	6	0	6
2	Spain	3	2	1	4	3	4
3	Argentina	3	1	2	3	4	2
4	Tunisia	3	0	3	0	6	0

=== Group B ===
Pos	Team	Pld	W	L	SW	SL	Pts
1	Brazil	3	3	0	6	0	6
2	Australia	3	2	1	4	3	4
3	Poland	3	1	2	3	4	2
4	Chinese Taipei	3	0	3	0	6	0

=== Knockout stage ===
Quarter-finals
28 July
Norway	2
Chinese Taipei	0
28 July
Argentina	2
Australia	1
28 July
Poland	0
Spain	2
28 July
Brazil	2
Tunisia	0

Semi-finals
28 July
Norway	1
Argentina	2
28 July
Spain	0
Brazil	2

Gold medal
29 July
Argentina	0
Brazil	2
Bronze medal
29 July
Norway	1
Spain	2

==== 5th–8th place play-offs ====
Semi-finals
28 July
Chinese Taipei	0
Australia	2
28 July
Poland	2
Tunisia	1

Fifth place
29 July
Australia	0
Poland	2
Seventh place
29 July
Chinese Taipei	2
Tunisia	1

=== Final ranking ===
Rank	Team
1st place, gold medalist(s)	Brazil
2nd place, silver medalist(s)	Argentina
3rd place, bronze medalist(s)	Spain
4	Norway
5	Poland
6	Australia
7	Chinese Taipei
8	Tunisia
