= Beach handball at the 2013 World Games =

- The pictogram of Beach handball.
- Venue: Cañaveralejo Bull Fighting Ring
- Dates: 2–4 August 2013
- Competitors: from 12 nations

The beach handball competition at the 2013 World Games was held from 2 August to 4 August, at the Cañaveralejo Bull Fighting Ring in Cali, Colombia.

== Medal summary ==
Event	Gold	Silver	Bronze
Men	Brazil	Russia	Croatia
Women	Brazil	Hungary	Norway

== Men's tournament ==
=== Preliminary round ===
==== Group A ====
Rank	Team	W	L	Pts
1	Brazil	3	0	6
2	Russia	2	1	4
3	Colombia	1	2	2
4	Australia	0	3	0

	BRA	RUS	COL	AUS
Brazil		2–0	2–0	2–0
Russia	0–2		2–0	2–0
Colombia	0–2	0–2		2–1
Australia	0–2	0–2	1–2	

==== Group B ====
Rank	Team	W	L	Pts
1	Qatar	3	0	6
2	Croatia	1	2	2
3	Ukraine	1	2	2
4	Venezuela	1	2	2

	QAT	CRO	UKR	VEN
Qatar		2–0	2–1	2–0
Croatia	0–2		1–2	2–0
Ukraine	1–2	2–1		1–2
Venezuela	0–2	0–2	2–1	

=== Knockout stage ===
Semi-finals
3 August 2013
Brazil	2
Croatia	1
3 August 2013
Qatar	1
Russia	2

Final
4 August 2013
Brazil	2
Russia	0
Third place
4 August 2013
Croatia	2
Qatar	1

Semi-finals
3 August 2013
Colombia	1
Venezuela	2
3 August 2013
Ukraine	2
Australia	0

Final
4 August 2013
Venezuela	1
Ukraine	2
Third place
4 August 2013
Colombia	2
Australia	1

== Women's tournament ==
=== Preliminary round ===
==== Group A ====
Rank	Team	W	L	Pts
1	Norway	3	0	6
2	Chinese Taipei	1	2	2
3	Uruguay	1	2	2
4	Australia	1	2	2

	NOR	TPE	URU	AUS
Norway		2–1	2–0	2–0
Chinese Taipei	1–2		2–0	1–2
Uruguay	0–2	0–2		2–0
Australia	0–2	2–1	0–2	

==== Group B ====
Rank	Team	W	L	Pts
1	Brazil	3	0	6
2	Hungary	2	1	4
3	Colombia	1	2	2
4	Tunisia	0	3	0

	BRA	COL	HUN	TUN
Brazil		2–1	2–0	2–0
Hungary	1–2		2–0	2–0
Colombia	0–2	0–2		2–0
Tunisia	0–2	0–2	0–2	

=== Knockout stage ===
Semi-finals
3 August 2013
Norway	0
Hungary	2
3 August 2013
Brazil	2
Chinese Taipei	0

Final
4 August 2013
Hungary	1
Brazil	2
Third place
4 August 2013
Norway	2
Chinese Taipei	0

Semi-finals
3 August 2013
Uruguay	2
Tunisia	0
3 August 2013
Colombia	2
Australia	0

Final
4 August 2013
Uruguay	2
Colombia	0
Third place
4 August 2013
Tunisia	0
Australia	2
