= 2022 South and Central American Beach Handball Championship =

Tournament details
- Host country: Brazil
- Venue(s): 1 (in 1 host city)
- Dates: 10–13 April
- Teams: 12 (from 1 confederation)

Final positions
- Champions: Brazil (men); Argentina (women)
- Runner-up: Argentina (men); Brazil (women)
- Third place: Uruguay (men); Uruguay (women)
- Fourth place: Ecuador (men); Chile (women)

The 2022 South and Central American Beach Handball Championship was the second edition of the tournament, took place in Maceió, Brazil from 10 to 13 April 2022. It acted as the South and Central American qualifying tournament for the 2022 Beach Handball World Championships and the 2022 World Beach Games.

== Participating teams ==
Men

- Argentina
- Brazil
- Chile
- Ecuador
- Paraguay
- Uruguay

Women

- Argentina
- Brazil
- Chile
- Ecuador
- Paraguay
- Uruguay

== Men's tournament ==
=== Qualification round ===
Pos	Team	Pld	W	L	SW	SL	Pts
1	Brazil	5	5	0	10	2	10
2	Argentina	5	3	2	8	5	6
3	Uruguay	5	3	2	7	4	6
4	Ecuador	5	3	2	7	5	6
5	Chile	5	1	4	2	8	2
6	Paraguay	5	0	5	0	10	0

Team 1	Score	Team 2
10 April 2022
10:00
Argentina	1–2	Ecuador
11:00
Brazil	2–0	Paraguay
Uruguay	2–0	Chile
15:30
Chile	0–2	Argentina
16:30
Ecuador	1–2	Brazil
Paraguay	0–2	Uruguay
11 April 2022
10:00
Paraguay	0–2	Ecuador
11:00
Brazil	2–0	Chile
Uruguay	1–2	Argentina
15:30
Chile	2–0	Paraguay
16:30
Argentina	1–2	Brazil
Uruguay	2–0	Ecuador
12 April 2022
09:00
Brazil	2–0	Uruguay
11:00
Ecuador	2–0	Chile
Paraguay	0–2	Argentina

== Knockout stage ==
=== Bracket ===
Semifinals
13 April
Brazil	2
Ecuador	0
13 April
Argentina	2
Uruguay	0

Final
13 April
Brazil	2
Argentina	0
Third place
13 April
Ecuador	0
Uruguay	2

=== 5th place match ===
Team 1	Score	Team 2
13 April 2022
10:00
Chile	1–2	Paraguay

=== Final ranking ===
Rank	Team
1st place, gold medalist(s)	Brazil
2nd place, silver medalist(s)	Argentina
3rd place, bronze medalist(s)	Uruguay
4	Ecuador
5	Paraguay
6	Chile

Team qualified to the 2022 Men's Beach Handball World Championships and the 2022 World Beach Games

Teams qualified to the 2022 Men's Beach Handball World Championships

== Women's tournament ==
=== Qualification round ===
Pos	Team	Pld	W	L	SW	SL	Pts
1	Brazil	5	5	0	10	1	10
2	Uruguay	5	4	1	8	3	8
3	Argentina	5	3	2	7	4	6
4	Chile	5	2	3	4	7	4
5	Paraguay	5	1	4	4	8	2
6	Ecuador	5	0	5	0	10	0

Team 1	Score	Team 2
10 April 2022
09:00
Argentina	2–0	Ecuador
Paraguay	1–2	Chile
10:00
Brazil	2–0	Uruguay
14:30
Uruguay	2–0	Argentina
Chile	0–2	Brazil
15:30
Ecuador	0–2	Paraguay
11 April 2022
09:00
Argentina	2–0	Paraguay
Uruguay	2–0	Chile
10:00
Brazil	2–0	Ecuador
14:30
Argentina	2–0	Chile
Ecuador	0–2	Uruguay
15:30
Paraguay	0–2	Brazil
12 April 2022
09:00
Uruguay	2–1	Paraguay
10:00
Chile	2–0	Ecuador
Brazil	2–1	Argentina

== Knockout stage ==
=== Bracket ===
Semifinals
13 April
Brazil	2
Chile	0
13 April
Uruguay	0
Argentina	2

Final
13 April
Brazil	1
Argentina	2
Third place
13 April
Chile	0
Uruguay	2

=== 5th place match ===
Team 1	Score	Team 2
13 April 2022
09:00
Paraguay	2–0	Ecuador

=== Final ranking ===
Rank	Team
1st place, gold medalist(s)	Argentina
2nd place, silver medalist(s)	Brazil
3rd place, bronze medalist(s)	Uruguay
4	Chile
5	Paraguay
6	Ecuador

Team qualified to the 2022 Women's Beach Handball World Championships and the 2022 World Beach Games

Teams qualified to the 2022 Women's Beach Handball World Championships
