= South and Central American Youth Beach Handball Championship =

Men's and Women's Beach handball

The South and Central American Youth Beach Handball Championship is the official competition for Men's and Women's Beach handball youth national teams of the South and Central America Handball Confederation.

== Men ==
=== Summary ===
Year	Host	Final			Third place match		
Year	Host	Champion	Score	Runner-up	Third place	Score	Fourth place
2022; Details	(Argentina); Buenos Aires	Brazil	2–0	Argentina	Uruguay	2–1	Paraguay
2024; Details	(Chile); Iquique	Argentina	No playoffs	Brazil	Uruguay	No playoffs	Chile

=== Medal table ===
Rank	Nation	Gold	Silver	Bronze	Total
1	Argentina	1	1	0	2
1	Brazil	1	1	0	2
3	Uruguay	0	0	2	2
Totals (3 entries)		2	2	2	6

=== Participating nations ===
Nation	(Argentina) 2022	(Chile) 2024	Years
Argentina	2nd	1st	2
Brazil	1st	2nd	2
Chile	—	4th	1
Paraguay	4th	6th	2
Peru	—	5th	1
Uruguay	3rd	3rd	2
Total	4	6	

== Women ==
=== Summary ===
Year	Host	Final			Third place match		
Year	Host	Champion	Score	Runner-up	Third place	Score	Fourth place
2022; Details	(Argentina); Buenos Aires	Argentina	2–1	Brazil	Uruguay	2–0	Paraguay
2024; Details	(Chile); Iquique	Brazil	No playoffs	Uruguay	Argentina	No playoffs	Paraguay

=== Medal table ===
Rank	Nation	Gold	Silver	Bronze	Total
1	Brazil	1	1	0	2
2	Argentina	1	0	1	2
3	Uruguay	0	1	1	2
Totals (3 entries)		2	2	2	6

=== Participating nations ===
Nation	(Argentina) 2022	(Chile) 2024	Years
Argentina	1st	3rd	2
Brazil	2nd	1st	2
Chile	5th	5th	2
Paraguay	4th	4th	2
Uruguay	3rd	2nd	2
Total	5	5	
