= 2011 South American Beach Games =

International multi-sport event

- Nations: 10
- Events: 9 sports
- Opening: 2 December 2011
- Closing: 11 December 2011
- Torch lighter: Ariana Vilela
- Ceremony venue: Arena Suramericana de Playa Murcielago

The II 2011 Beach South American Games were held in Manta, Ecuador.

== Venues ==
In order to provide the audience in Manta, Ecuador with overall comfort during the opening of the II South American Beach Games Manta 2011, the organizers decided to expand the capacity of the main stage that rises in the Playa El Murciélago from 4,000 to 5,000 spectators.

The committee organizing the Games (COMANTA) expects to host more than a thousand athletes from 10 participating countries, as well as dignitaries, officials, special guests and the general public, said Alberto Adum, executive director of the Games.

The opening ceremony is scheduled for the afternoon of Friday, December 2, with a show, which according to Adum, is unprecedented in sports events conducted in Ecuador.

Although he prefers to keep the inaugural program a surprise, Adum said that the opening will include an air show that will include the participation of a group of parachutists, and more than 150 artists will offer performances based on the main characteristics of the host city.

Sports including rugby union, soccer, beach handball, and beach volleyball will be hosted in this event.

The host city staff are working on the construction of additional features besides the main stage (changing rooms, showers, bathrooms, etc.), which they expect will be completed in November.

== Sports ==
Nine sports were contested in this edition of South American Beach Games.

- Beach handball
- Beach rugby
- Beach soccer
- Beach volleyball
- Open water swimming
- Sailing
- Surfing
- Triathlon
- Water ski

== Participating nations ==
Ten nations participated in this edition of South American Beach Games.

- Argentina
- Bolivia
- Brazil
- Chile
- Colombia
- Ecuador
- Paraguay
- Peru
- Uruguay
- Venezuela

== Medal table ==
27 gold medals were awarded in the Games. Brazil topped the medal table in this edition of the South American Beach Games.

* Host nation (Ecuador)

Rank	Nation	Gold	Silver	Bronze	Total
1	Brazil	12	3	5	20
2	Argentina	7	9	6	22
3	Ecuador*	6	4	3	13
4	Peru	2	1	2	5
5	Venezuela	0	6	3	9
6	Uruguay	0	1	3	4
7	Chile	0	1	2	3
7	Colombia	0	1	2	3
7	Paraguay	0	1	2	3
Totals (9 entries)		27	27	28	82
