= Beach handball at the 2009 World Games =

The beach handball competition at the World Games 2009 took place from July 18 to July 20, at the Sizihwan in Kaohsiung, Taiwan.

== Medal table ==
Rank	Nation	Gold	Silver	Bronze	Total
1	Brazil (BRA)	1	0	1	2
2	Italy (ITA)	1	0	0	1
3	Croatia (CRO)	0	1	1	2
4	Hungary (HUN)	0	1	0	1
Totals (4 entries)		2	2	2	6

== Medal summary ==
Event	Gold	Silver	Bronze
Men	Brazil	Hungary	Croatia
Women	Italy	Croatia	Brazil

== Men's tournament ==
=== Preliminary round ===
==== Group A ====
Rank	Team	W	L	Pts
1	Turkey	3	0	6
2	Croatia	2	1	4
3	Pakistan	1	2	2
4	Thailand	0	3	0

	TUR	CRO	PAK	THA
Turkey		2–1	2–0	2–0
Croatia	1–2		2–0	2–0
Pakistan	0–2	0–2		2–1
Thailand	0–2	0–2	1–2	

==== Group B ====
Rank	Team	W	L	Pts
1	Brazil	3	0	6
2	Hungary	2	1	4
3	Chinese Taipei	1	2	2
4	Oman	0	3	0

	BRA	HUN	TPE	OMA
Brazil		2–0	2–1	2–0
Hungary	0–2		2–1	2–0
Chinese Taipei	1–2	1–2		2–1
Oman	0–2	0–2	1–2	

=== Knockout stage ===
Quarterfinals
A2	Croatia	2
B3	Chinese Taipei	1
B1	Brazil	2
A4	Thailand	0
B2	Hungary	2
A3	Pakistan	0
A1	Turkey	1
B4	Oman	2

Semifinals
A2	Croatia	1
B1	Brazil	2
B2	Hungary	2
B4	Oman	0

Gold medal game
B1	Brazil	2
B2	Hungary	0
Bronze medal game
A2	Croatia	2
B4	Oman	0

== Women's tournament ==
=== Preliminary round ===
==== Group A ====
Rank	Team	W	L	Pts
1	Brazil	3	0	6
2	North Macedonia	2	1	4
3	Ukraine	1	2	2
4	Chinese Taipei	0	3	0

	BRA	MKD	UKR	TPE
Brazil		2–0	2–0	2–0
North Macedonia	0–2		2–1	2–1
Ukraine	0–2	1–2		2–1
Chinese Taipei	0–2	1–2	1–2	

==== Group B ====
Rank	Team	W	L	Pts
1	Italy	3	0	6
2	Croatia	2	1	4
3	Thailand	1	2	2
4	Japan	0	3	0

	ITA	CRO	THA	JPN
Italy		2–1	2–0	2–0
Croatia	1–2		2–0	2–0
Thailand	0–2	0–2		2–1
Japan	0–2	0–2	1–2	

=== Knockout stage ===
Quarterfinals
A2	North Macedonia	2
B3	Thailand	0
B1	Italy	2
A4	Chinese Taipei	0
B2	Croatia	2
A3	Ukraine	0
A1	Brazil	2
B4	Japan	0

Semifinals
A2	North Macedonia	0
B1	Italy	2
B2	Croatia	2
A1	Brazil	1

Gold medal game
B1	Italy	2
B2	Croatia	1
Bronze medal game
A2	North Macedonia	0
B1	Brazil	2
