= Beach handball at the 2022 World Games =

Athletic competition

- Venue: Sloss Furnaces
- Dates: 11–15 July 2022
- No. of events: 2

The beach handball competition at the 2022 World Games took place 11–15 July 2022, in Birmingham in United States, at the Sloss Furnaces. Originally scheduled to take place in July 2021, the Games were rescheduled for July 2022 as a result of the 2020 Summer Olympics postponement due to the COVID-19 pandemic.

== Qualification ==
=== Men's tournament ===
Means of qualification	Vacancies	Qualified
Host country	1	United States
2018 World Championships	1	Brazil
2021 European Championship	1	Croatia
2022 Asian Championship	1	Qatar
2022 South and Central American Championship	1	Argentina
2022 Oceania Championship	1	New Zealand
2022 Nor.ca Championship	1	Puerto Rico

=== Women's tournament ===
Means of qualification	Vacancies	Qualified
Host country	1	United States
2018 World Championships	1	Norway
2021 European Championship	1	Germany
2022 South and Central American Championship	1	Argentina
2022 Oceania Championship	1	Australia
2022 Nor.ca Championship	1	Mexico

== Schedule ==
G	Preliminary Round	G2	Main Round	¼	Quarter-finals	½	Semi-finals	B	Bronze medal	F	Final

Date Event	Mon 11	Thu 12	Wed 13	Thu 14	Fri 15	Fri 15	Sat 16
Men	G	G	G2	¼	½	B	F
Women	G	G	G2	¼	½	B	F

== Men's tournament ==
=== Group A Preliminary round ===
Pos	Team	Pld	W	L	SW	SL	Pts
1	Croatia	2	2	0	4	0	4
2	Qatar	2	1	1	2	-2	2
3	New Zealand	2	0	2	0	-4	0

Team 1	Score	Team 2
11 July 2022
12:00
New Zealand	0–2	Croatia
17:30
Qatar	2–0	New Zealand
12 July 2022
10:00
Croatia	2–0	Qatar

=== Group B Preliminary round ===
Pos	Team	Pld	W	L	SW	SL	Pts
1	Brazil	3	3	0	6	0	6
2	United States	3	2	1	4	-2	4
3	Argentina	3	1	2	2	-4	2
4	Puerto Rico	3	0	3	0	-6	0

Team 1	Score	Team 2
11 July 2022
11:10
United States	2–0	Puerto Rico
Brazil	2–0	Argentina
16:40
Argentina	0–2	United States
Puerto Rico	0–2	Brazil
12 July 2022
10:50
Brazil	2–0	United States
11:40
Argentina	2–0	Puerto Rico

=== Group I Main round ===
Pos	Team	Pld	W	L	SW	SL	Pts
1	Croatia	3	2	1	5	2	4
2	Qatar	3	2	1	4	3	4
3	Argentina	3	2	1	4	1	4
4	Puerto Rico	3	0	3	0	-6	0

Team 1	Score	Team 2
13 July 2022
11:10
Croatia	2–0	Puerto Rico
12:00
Qatar	2–0	Argentina
18:00
Argentina	2–1	Croatia
Puerto Rico	0–2	Qatar

=== Group II Main Round ===
Pos	Team	Pld	W	L	SW	SL	Pts
1	Brazil	2	2	0	4	0	4
2	United States	2	1	1	2	2	2
3	New Zealand	2	0	2	0	-4	0

Team 1	Score	Team 2
13 July 2022
11:10
United States	2–0	New Zealand
17:10
Brazil	2–0	New Zealand

=== Knockout stage ===
Semi-finals
14 July
Croatia	2
United States	1
14 July
Brazil	1
Qatar	2

Gold medal
15 July
Croatia	2
Qatar	1
Bronze medal
15 July
United States	0
Brazil	2

=== Placement round ===
Pos	Team	Pld	W	L	SW	SL	Pts
5	Argentina	2	2	0	4	0	4
6	Puerto Rico	2	1	1	2	2	2
7	New Zealand	2	0	2	0	4	0

Team 1	Score	Team 2
14 July 2022
14:40
Puerto Rico	2–0	New Zealand
18:00
New Zealand	0–2	Argentina
15 July 2022
12:50
Argentina	2-0	Puerto Rico

=== Final ranking ===
Rank	Team
1st place, gold medalist(s)	Croatia
2nd place, silver medalist(s)	Qatar
3rd place, bronze medalist(s)	Brazil
4	United States
5	Argentina
6	Puerto Rico
7	New Zealand

== Women's tournament ==
=== Group A ===
Pos	Team	Pld	W	L	SW	SL	Pts
1	Germany	5	5	0	10	2	10
2	Norway	5	4	1	9	3	8
3	Argentina	5	3	2	8	4	6
4	United States	5	2	3	4	6	4
5	Mexico	5	1	4	2	8	2
6	Australia	5	0	5	0	10	0

Team 1	Score	Team 2
11 July 2022
09:30
Germany	2–0	Mexico
Argentina	2–0	Australia
10:20
Norway	2–0	United States
15:00
Argentina	1–2	Germany
15:50
United States	2–0	Australia
Mexico	0–2	Norway
12 July 2022
16:30
Norway	1–2	Germany
17:20
Argentina	2–0	United States
18:10
Australia	0–2	Mexico
13 July 2022
09:30
Germany	2–0	Australia
Norway	2–1	Argentina
10:20
United States	2–0	Mexico
15:30
Australia	0–2	Norway
Mexico	0–2	Argentina
16:20
Germany	2–0	United States

=== Knockout stage ===
Semi-finals
14 July
Norway	2
Argentina	0
14 July
Germany	2
United States	0

Gold medal
15 July
Norway	0
Germany	2
Bronze medal
15 July
Argentina	2
United States	0

=== 5th-place match ===
Team 1	Score	Team 2
15 July 2022
13:40
Mexico	2–0	Australia

=== Final ranking ===
Rank	Team
1st place, gold medalist(s)	Germany
2nd place, silver medalist(s)	Norway
3rd place, bronze medalist(s)	Argentina
4	United States
5	Mexico
6	Australia

== Medalists ==
Event	Gold	Silver	Bronze
Men's tournament	Croatia	Qatar	Brazil
Women's tournament	Germany	Norway	Argentina
