= 2009 South American Beach Games =

- Nations: 15
- Events: 10 sports
- Opening: 2 December 2009
- Closing: 13 December 2009
- Ceremony venue: Estadio Arenas del Plata

The I Beach South American Games was a multi-sport event held from 2 to 13 December 2009 in Montevideo and Punta del Este, Uruguay. The Games was organized by the South American Sports Organization (ODESUR).

== Participating teams ==
15 nations of the Organización Deportiva Suramericana (ODESUR) competed in these Beach Games.

- Argentina
- Aruba
- Bolivia
- Brazil
- Chile
- Colombia
- Ecuador
- Guyana
- Netherlands Antilles
- Panama
- Paraguay
- Peru
- Suriname
- Uruguay (Host)
- Venezuela

== Medal count ==
The medal count for these Beach Games is tabulated below. This table is sorted by the number of gold medals earned by each country. The number of silver medals is taken into consideration next, and then the number of bronze medals.

* Host nation (Uruguay)

Rank	Nation	Gold	Silver	Bronze	Total
1	Brazil (BRA)	12	6	7	25
2	Argentina (ARG)	9	5	8	22
3	Venezuela (VEN)	2	4	2	8
4	Ecuador (ECU)	2	0	1	3
5	Colombia (COL)	1	3	1	5
6	Peru (PER)	1	2	0	3
7	Uruguay (URU)*	0	5	3	8
8	Chile (CHI)	0	1	5	6
9	Paraguay (PAR)	0	1	0	1
Totals (9 entries)		27	27	27	81

== Sports ==
- Beach handball
- Beach rugby
- Beach soccer
- Beach volleyball
- Fitness (demonstration)
- Marathon swimming
- Sailing
- Surfing
- Triathlon
- Water ski
