= 2019 South and Central American Beach Handball Championship =

Tournament details
- Host country: Brazil
- Venue(s): 1 (in 1 host city)
- Dates: 11–14 July
- Teams: 11 (from 1 confederation)

Final positions
- Champions: Brazil (men); Brazil (women)
- Runner-up: Uruguay (men); Argentina (women)
- Third place: Argentina (men); Paraguay (women)
- Fourth place: Paraguay (men); Uruguay (women)

The 2019 South and Central American Beach Handball Championship was the first edition of the tournament, took place in Maricá, Brazil from 11 to 14 july 2019. It acted as the South and Central American qualifying tournament for the 2020 Beach Handball World Championships and the 2019 World Beach Games.

== Participating teams ==
Men

- Argentina
- Brazil
- Chile
- Ecuador
- Paraguay
- Uruguay
- ~~Venezuela~~ (withdrew)

Women

- Argentina
- Brazil
- Chile
- Paraguay
- Uruguay
- ~~Venezuela~~ (withdrew)

== Men's tournament ==
=== Qualification round ===
| Pos | Team | Pld | W | L | SW | SL | Pts |
|---|---|---|---|---|---|---|---|
| 1 | Brazil | 5 | 5 | 0 | 10 | 0 | 10 |
| 2 | Uruguay | 5 | 4 | 1 | 8 | 2 | 8 |
| 3 | Argentina | 5 | 3 | 2 | 6 | 4 | 6 |
| 4 | Paraguay | 5 | 2 | 3 | 4 | 7 | 4 |
| 5 | Ecuador | 5 | 1 | 4 | 2 | 8 | 2 |
| 6 | Chile | 5 | 0 | 5 | 1 | 10 | 0 |

== Knockout stage ==
=== Bracket ===
Semifinals
14 July
Brazil | 2
Paraguay | 0
14 July
Uruguay | 2
Argentina | 1

Final
14 July
Brazil | 2
Uruguay | 0
Third place
14 July
Paraguay | 0
Argentina | 2

=== Final ranking ===
| Rank | Team |
|---|---|
| 1st place, gold medalist(s) | Brazil |
| 2nd place, silver medalist(s) | Uruguay |
| 3rd place, bronze medalist(s) | Argentina |
| 4 | Paraguay |
| 5 | Ecuador |
| 6 | Chile |

| Teams qualified to the 2020 Men's Beach Handball World Championships and the 2019 World Beach Games |

| Team qualified to the 2020 Men's Beach Handball World Championships |

== Women's tournament ==
=== Qualification round ===
| Pos | Team | Pld | W | L | SW | SL | Pts |
|---|---|---|---|---|---|---|---|
| 1 | Brazil | 4 | 4 | 0 | 8 | 1 | 8 |
| 2 | Uruguay | 4 | 3 | 1 | 6 | 4 | 6 |
| 3 | Argentina | 4 | 2 | 2 | 4 | 4 | 4 |
| 4 | Paraguay | 4 | 1 | 3 | 4 | 6 | 2 |
| 5 | Chile | 4 | 0 | 4 | 1 | 8 | 0 |

== Knockout stage ==
=== Bracket ===
Semifinals
13 July
Brazil | 2
Paraguay | 0
13 July
Uruguay | 1
Argentina | 2

Final
14 July
Brazil | 2
Argentina | 0
Third place
14 July
Paraguay | 2
Uruguay | 1

=== Final ranking ===
| Rank | Team |
|---|---|
| 1st place, gold medalist(s) | Brazil |
| 2nd place, silver medalist(s) | Argentina |
| 3rd place, bronze medalist(s) | Paraguay |
| 4 | Uruguay |
| 5 | Chile |

| Teams qualified to the 2020 Women's Beach Handball World Championships and the 2019 World Beach Games |
