= Beach handball at the 2019 South American Beach Games =

Beach Handball at the 2019 South American Beach Games
- Venue: Balneario La Florida
- Location: (Argentina) Rosario
- Dates: 17 – 19 March
- Nations: 9
- Teams: 9 (men); 7 (women)

Beach Handball competition of the 2019 South American Beach Games in Rosario were held from 17 to 19 March at the Balneario La Florida.

== Participating teams ==
Men

- Argentina
- Brazil
- Chile
- Colombia
- Ecuador
- Paraguay
- Peru
- Uruguay
- Venezuela

Women

- Argentina
- Brazil
- Chile
- Colombia
- Paraguay
- Peru
- Venezuela

== Medal summary ==
| Event | Gold | Silver | Bronze |
|---|---|---|---|
| Men's tournament | Brazil | Uruguay | Venezuela |
| Women's tournament | Argentina | Brazil | Paraguay |

== Men's tournament ==
=== Group A ===
| Pos | Team | Pld | W | L | SW | SL | Pts |
|---|---|---|---|---|---|---|---|
| 1 | Brazil | 4 | 4 | 0 | 8 | 0 | 8 |
| 2 | Venezuela | 4 | 3 | 1 | 6 | 4 | 6 |
| 3 | Ecuador | 4 | 2 | 2 | 5 | 4 | 4 |
| 4 | Peru | 4 | 1 | 3 | 2 | 7 | 2 |
| 5 | Colombia | 4 | 0 | 4 | 2 | 8 | 0 |

=== Group B ===
| Pos | Team | Pld | W | L | SW | SL | Pts |
|---|---|---|---|---|---|---|---|
| 1 | Uruguay | 3 | 3 | 0 | 6 | 0 | 6 |
| 2 | Chile | 3 | 2 | 1 | 4 | 2 | 4 |
| 3 | Argentina | 3 | 1 | 2 | 2 | 5 | 2 |
| 4 | Paraguay | 3 | 0 | 3 | 1 | 6 | 0 |

== Knockout stage ==
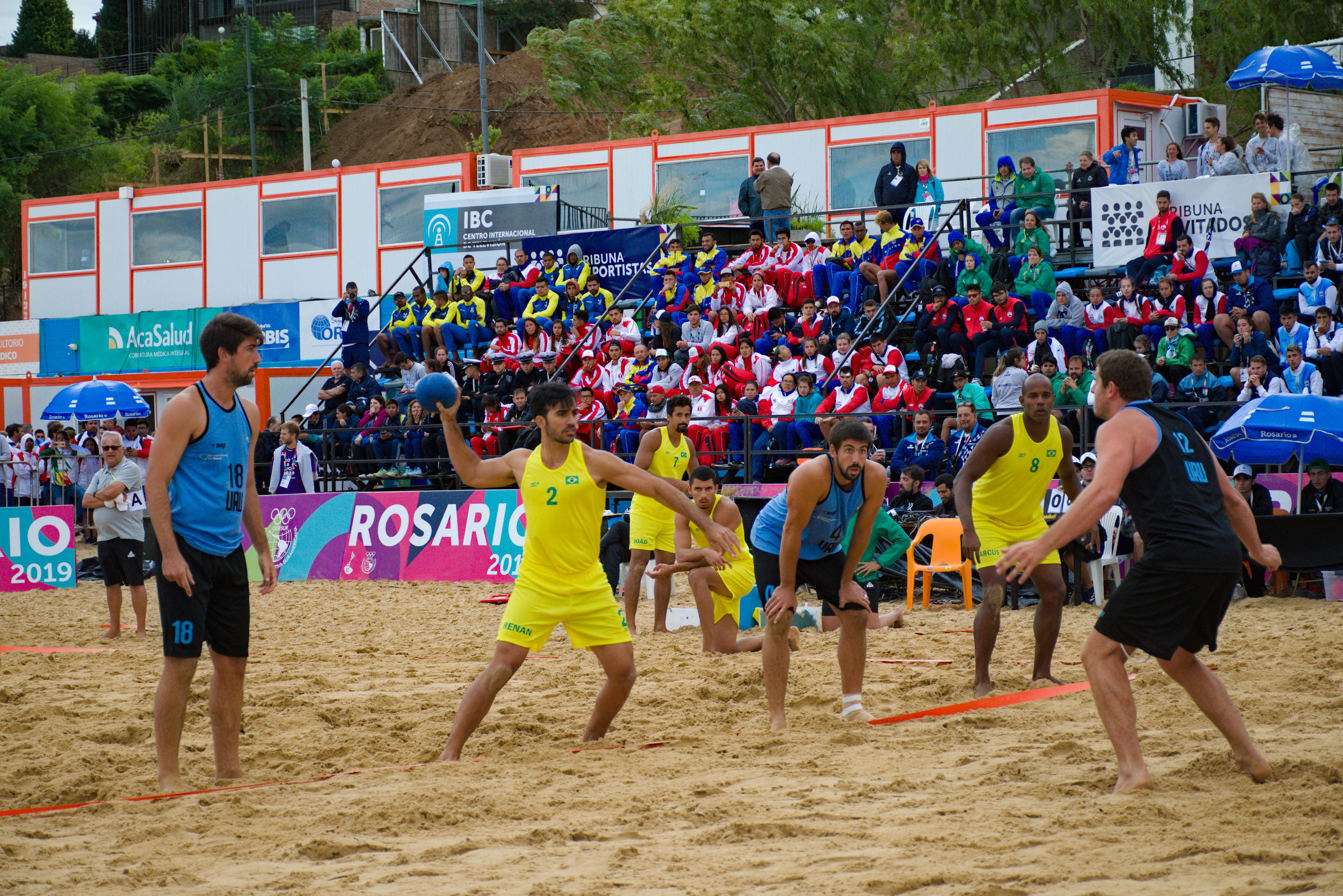
Penalty for Brazil in the final match against Uruguay

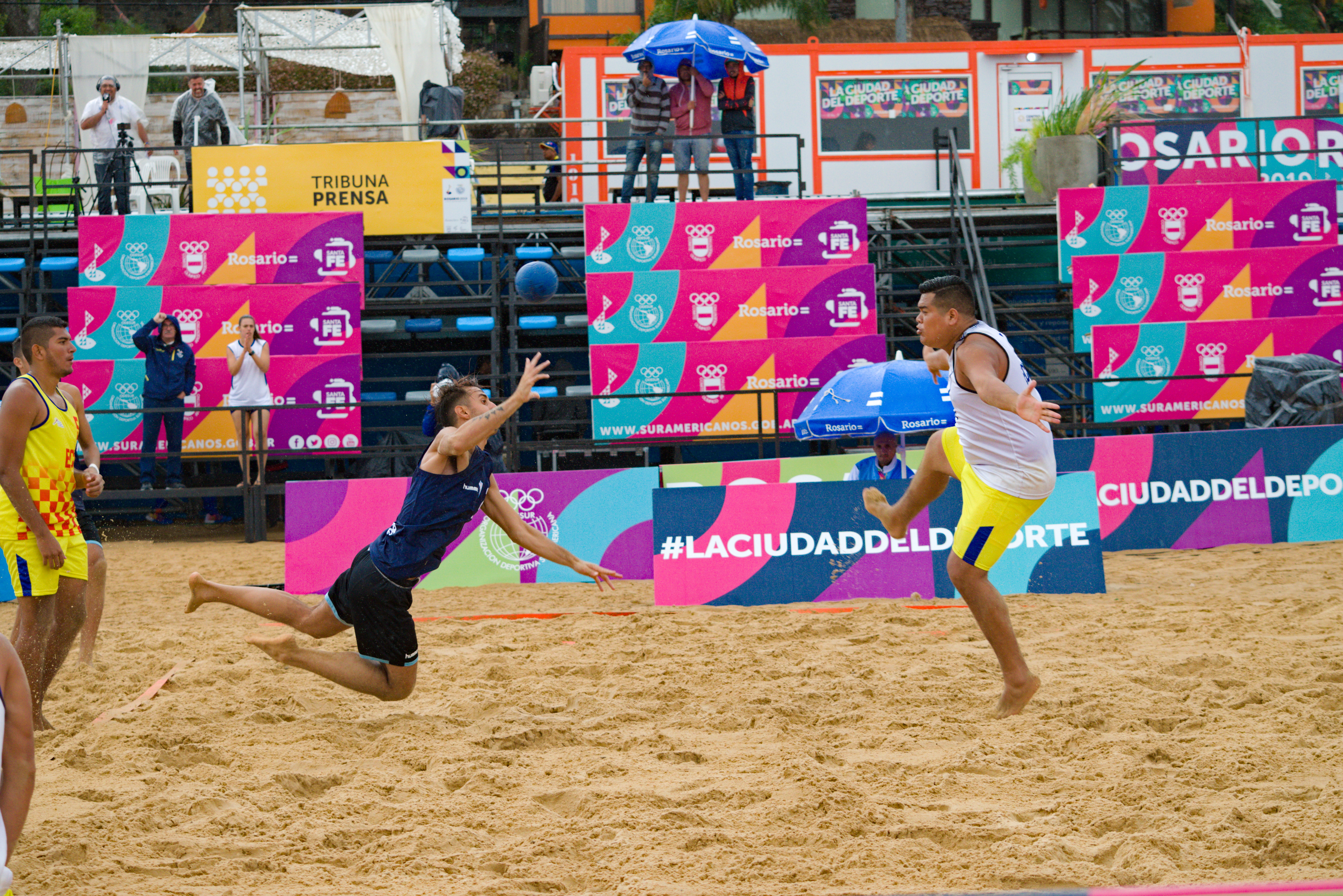
Match for 5th place, Argentina vs Ecuador

=== Bracket ===
Semifinals
19 March
Chile | 0
Brazil | 2
19 March
Uruguay | 2
Venezuela | 0

Final
19 March
Brazil | 2
Uruguay | 1
Third place
19 March
Chile | 0
Venezuela | 2

=== Final ranking ===
| Rank | Team |
|---|---|
| 1st place, gold medalist(s) | Brazil |
| 2nd place, silver medalist(s) | Uruguay |
| 3rd place, bronze medalist(s) | Venezuela |
| 4 | Chile |
| 5 | Argentina |
| 6 | Ecuador |
| 7 | Paraguay |
| 8 | Peru |
| 9 | Colombia |

== Women's tournament ==
=== Group A ===
| Pos | Team | Pld | W | L | SW | SL | Pts |
|---|---|---|---|---|---|---|---|
| 1 | Brazil | 2 | 2 | 0 | 4 | 0 | 4 |
| 2 | Venezuela | 2 | 1 | 1 | 2 | 3 | 2 |
| 3 | Colombia | 2 | 0 | 2 | 1 | 4 | 0 |

=== Group B ===
| Pos | Team | Pld | W | L | SW | SL | Pts |
|---|---|---|---|---|---|---|---|
| 1 | Argentina | 3 | 3 | 0 | 6 | 0 | 6 |
| 2 | Paraguay | 3 | 2 | 1 | 4 | 3 | 4 |
| 3 | Chile | 3 | 1 | 2 | 3 | 4 | 2 |
| 4 | Peru | 3 | 0 | 3 | 0 | 6 | 0 |

== Knockout stage ==
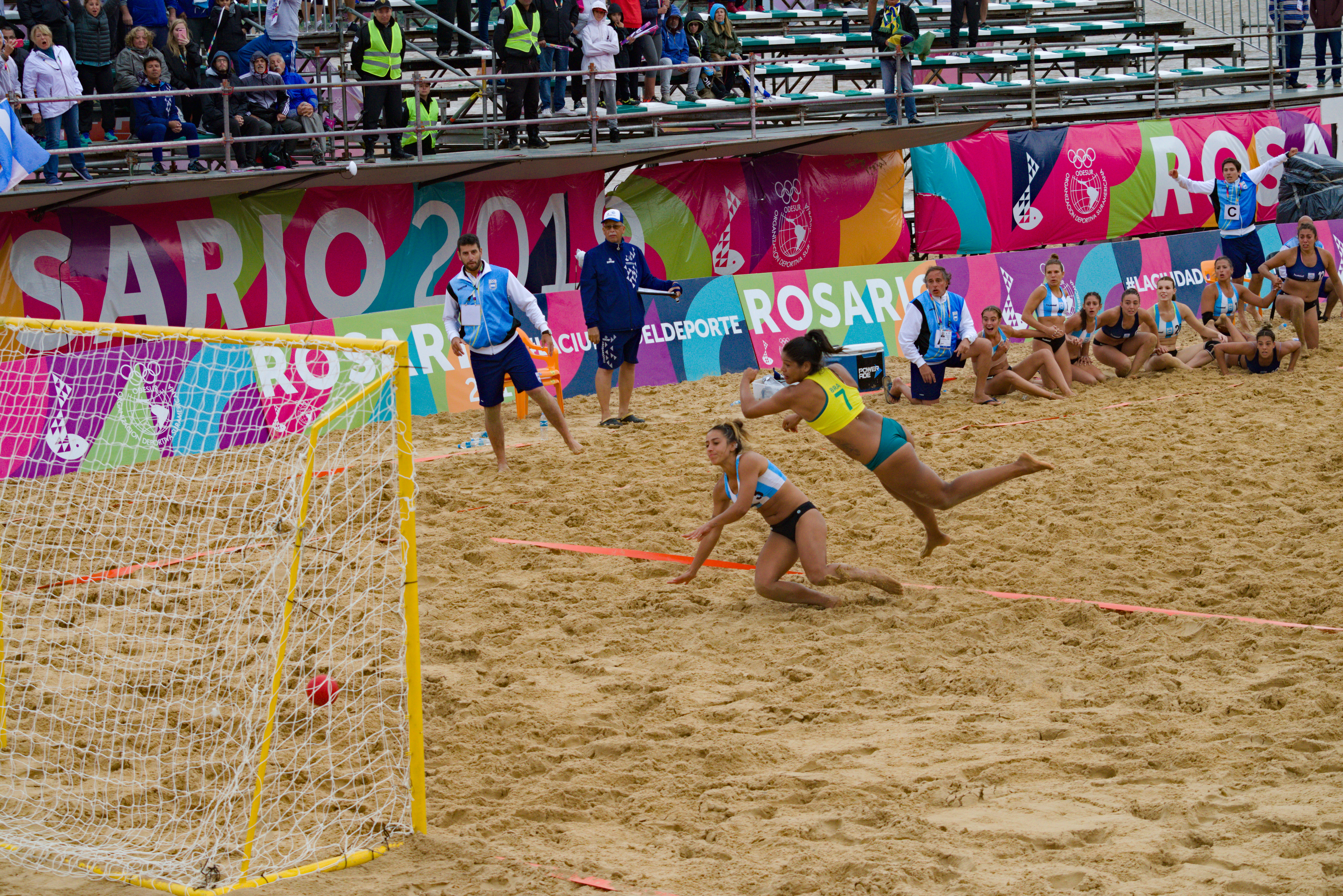
Caterina Benedetti (Argentina, blue) scores in the final match against Brazil

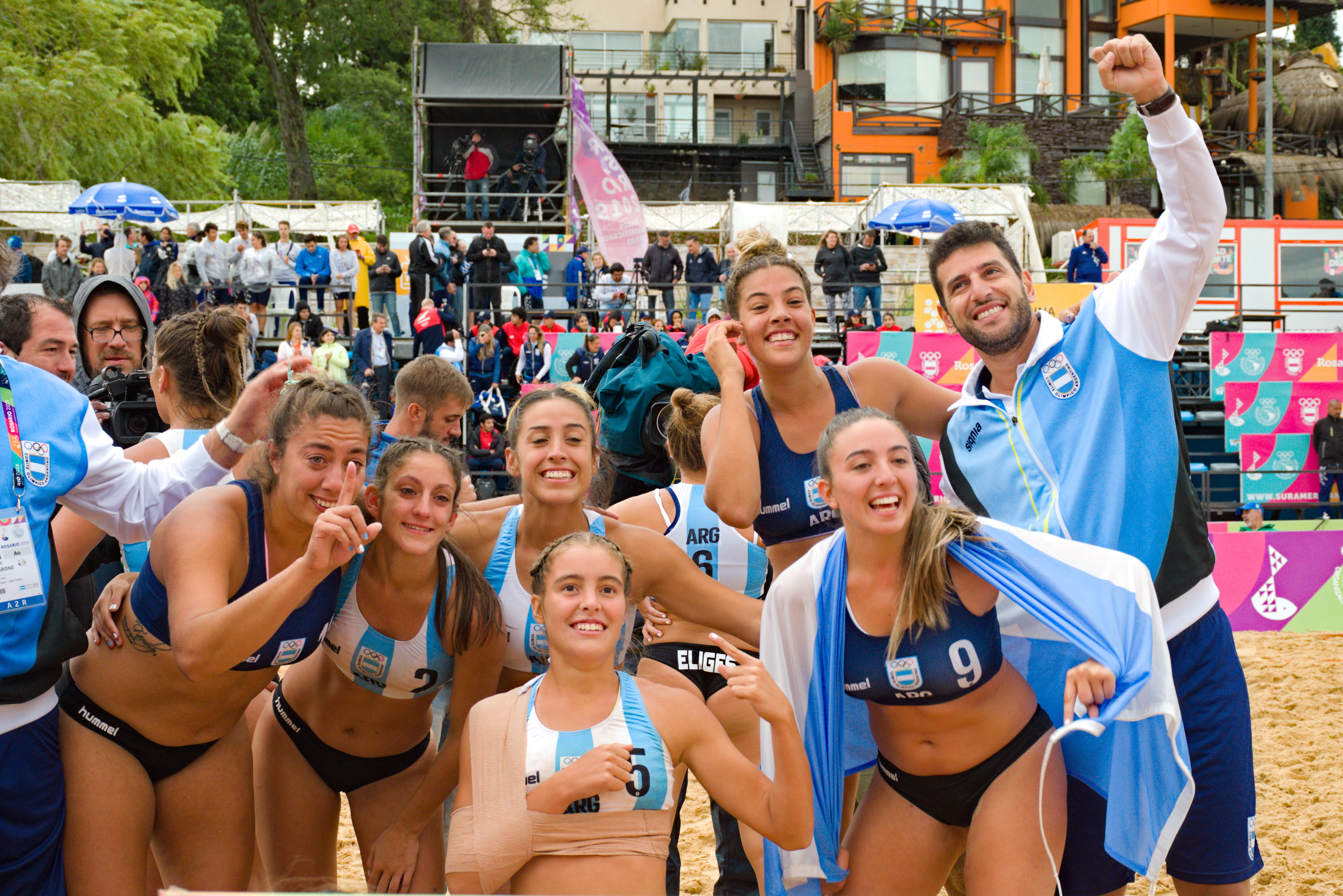
The argentinian team celebrates their victory

=== Bracket ===
Semifinals
19 March
Brazil | 2
Paraguay | 0
19 March
Argentina | 2
Venezuela | 0

Final
19 March
Brazil | 1
Argentina | 2
Third place
19 March
Paraguay | 2
Venezuela | 0

=== Final ranking ===
| Rank | Team |
|---|---|
| 1st place, gold medalist(s) | Argentina |
| 2nd place, silver medalist(s) | Brazil |
| 3rd place, bronze medalist(s) | Paraguay |
| 4 | Venezuela |
| 5 | Chile |
| 6 | Colombia |
| 7 | Peru |
