= Argentina men's national beach handball team =

Argentina

Information
- Nickname: Los Kamikazes
- Association: Argentine Handball Confederation
- Coach: Sebastián Ferraro
- Assistant coach: Andrés Bueno

Colours
Home	Away

Results

World Games
- Appearances: 1 (First in 2022)
- Best result: 5th (2022)

World Championship
- Appearances: 5 (First in 2014)
- Best result: Third place (2026)
- Last updated on Unknown.

The Argentina national beach handball team is the national team of Argentina. It is governed by the Argentine Handball Confederation and takes part in international beach handball competitions.

== Competition results ==
=== World Championships ===
- 2014 – 10th place
- 2018 – 11th place
- 2022 – 11th place
- 2024 – 8th place
- 2026 –

=== World Games ===
- 2022 – 5th place

=== Other competitions ===
- 2019 South American Beach Games – 5th place
- 2023 South American Beach Games –
- 2019 South and Central American Beach Handball Championship –
- 2022 South and Central American Beach Handball Championship –
- 2024 South and Central American Beach Handball Championship –
- 2026 South and Central American Beach Handball Championship –

=== Youth team results ===
- 2018 Summer Youth Olympics –
- 2017 Youth Beach Handball World Championship –
- 2022 Youth Beach Handball World Championship – 5th
- 2017 Pan American Youth Beach Handball Championship –
- 2022 South and Central American Youth Beach Handball Championship –
- 2022 South American Youth Games –
- 2024 South and Central American Youth Beach Handball Championship –
- 2025 Youth Beach Handball World Championship – 7th
