= Beach handball at the 2001 World Games =

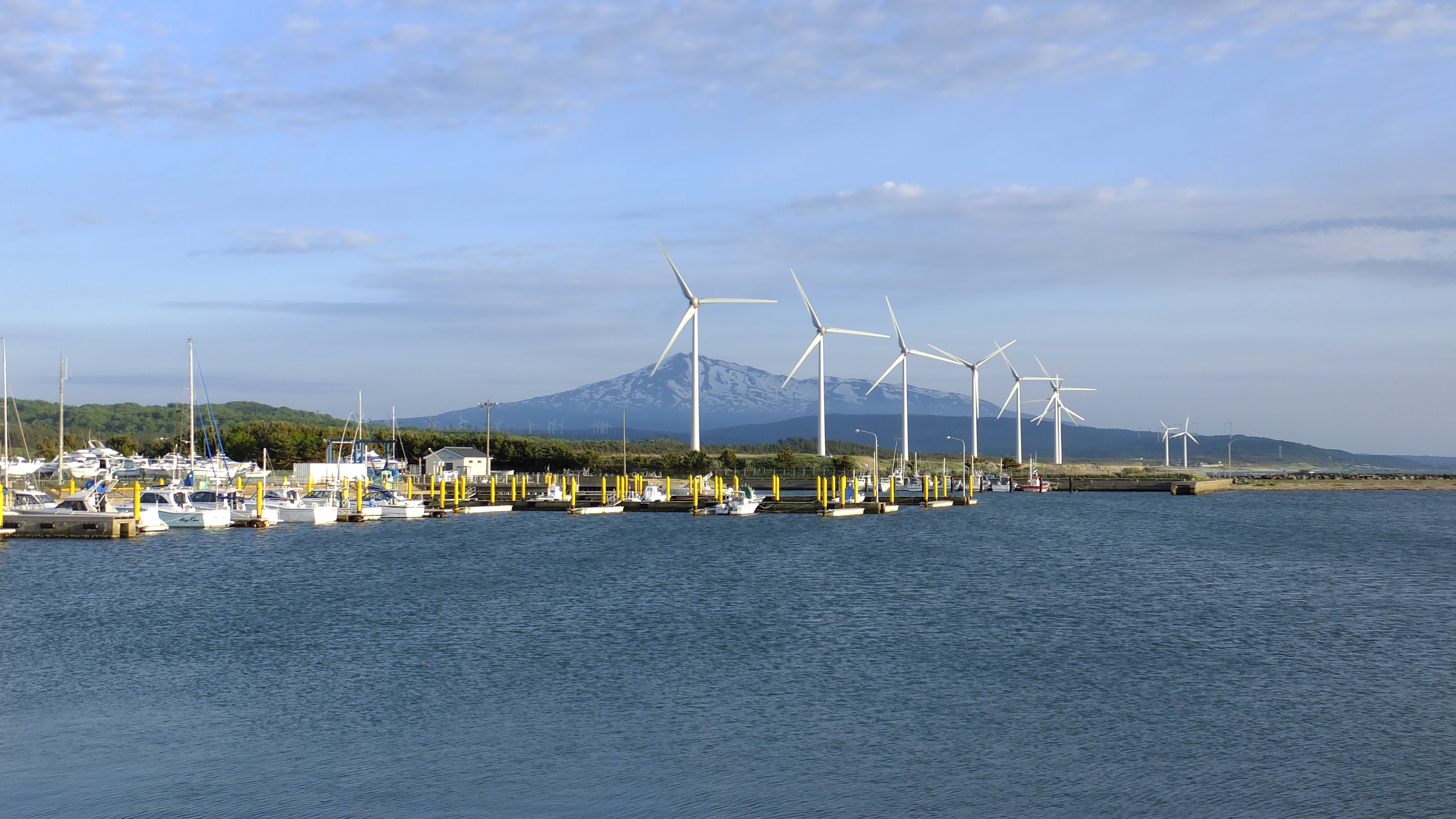
- Honjō Marina
- Venues: Honjō Marina
- Dates: 23–25 August 2001
- Competitors: from 9 nations

Beach handball was one of the invitational sports at the 2001 World Games in Akita and was played between 23 and 25 August. Athletes from 9 nations participated in the tournament.The competition took place at Honjō Marina in Honjō.

== Participating nations ==
- Belarus
- Brazil
- China
- Germany
- Iran
- Japan
- Spain
- Togo
- Ukraine

== Medal table ==
Rank	Nation	Gold	Silver	Bronze	Total
1	Belarus	1	0	0	1
1	Ukraine	1	0	0	1
3	Germany	0	1	0	1
3	Spain	0	1	0	1
5	Brazil	0	0	2	2
Totals (5 entries)		2	2	2	6

== Events ==
Event	Gold	Silver	Bronze
Men	Belarus	Spain	Brazil
Women	Ukraine	Germany	Brazil
