= Argentina women's national beach handball team =

Argentina

Information
- Nickname: Las Kamikazes
- Association: Argentinean Handball Confederation
- Coach: Leticia Brunati

Colours
| Home | Away |

Results

World Games
- Appearances: 3 (First in 2017)
- Best result: Champions (2025)

World Championship
- Appearances: 5 (First in 2014)
- Best result: Champions (2026)
- Last updated on Unknown.

The Argentina women's national beach handball team is the national team of Argentina. It is governed by the Confederacion Argentina de Handball and takes part in international beach handball competitions.

== Results ==
=== World Championships ===
- 2014 – 11th place
- 2016 – 7th place
- 2022 – 7th place
- 2024 –
- 2026 –
- 2028 – Qualified

=== World Games ===
- 2017 –
- 2022 –
- 2025 –

=== World Beach Games ===
| Year | Position |
|---|---|
| (Qatar) 2019 | 10th place |
| Total | 1/1 |

=== Other Competitions ===
- 2019 South American Beach Games –
- 2019 South and Central American Beach Handball Championship –
- 2022 South and Central American Beach Handball Championship –
- 2023 IHF Beach Handball Global Tour Round 1 –
- 2023 South American Beach Games –
- 2024 South and Central American Beach Handball Championship –
- 2026 South and Central American Beach Handball Championship –

=== Youth team results ===
- 2017 Youth Beach Handball World Championship –
- 2017 Pan American Youth Beach Handball Championship –
- 2018 Summer Youth Olympics –
- 2022 South and Central American Youth Beach Handball Championship –
- 2022 South American Youth Games –
- 2022 Youth Beach Handball World Championship – 5th
- 2024 South and Central American Youth Beach Handball Championship –
