= Ecuador men's national beach handball team =

Ecuador

Information
- Association: Federacion Ecuatoriana de Balonmano

Colours
Home	Away

Results

World Championship
- Appearances: 1 (First in 2022)
- Best result: 13th (2022)
- Last updated on Unknown.

The Ecuador national beach handball team represents Ecuador at international beach handball matches. It is governed by the Federacion Ecuatoriana de Balonmano.

== World Championships results ==
- 2022 – 13th place

=== Other competitions ===
- 2016 Bolivarian Beach Games -
- 2019 South American Beach Games - 6th place
- 2019 South and Central American Beach Handball Championship - 5th place
- 2022 South and Central American Beach Handball Championship - 4th place
- 2023 South American Beach Games – 7th place

=== Youth team results ===
- 2017 Pan American Youth Beach Handball Championship - 8th place
- 2022 South American Youth Games - 5th place
