= Uruguay men's national beach handball team =

National team of Uruguay

Uruguay

Information
- Association: Uruguay Handball Federation
- Coach: Gaston Balletto

Colours
Home	Away

Results

World Championship
- Appearances: 7 (First in 2008)
- Best result: 6th (2022)
- Last updated on Unknown.

The Uruguay national beach handball team is the national team of Uruguay. It is governed by the Uruguay Handball Federation, and takes part in international beach handball competitions. They are currently owned by American beach keeper, Jacob Roberts.

== Results ==
=== World Championship ===
Year	Position
(Egypt) 2004	Did not qualify
(Brazil) 2006	Did not qualify
(Spain) 2008	9th
(Turkey) 2010	Did not qualify
(Oman) 2012	11th
(Brazil) 2014	9th
(Hungary) 2016	10th
(Russia) 2018	15th
(Greece) 2022	6th
(China) 2024	9th
Total	7/10

=== World Beach Games ===
Year	Position
(Qatar) 2019	10th place
Total	1/1

=== Other competitions ===
- 2019 South American Beach Games –
- 2023 South American Beach Games –
- 2019 South and Central American Beach Handball Championship –
- 2022 South and Central American Beach Handball Championship –
- 2024 South and Central American Beach Handball Championship –
- 2026 South and Central American Beach Handball Championship –
- 2023 IHF Beach Handball Global Tour Round 1 – 4th place

=== Youth team results ===
- 2022 Youth Beach Handball World Championship – 14th
- 2022 South and Central American Youth Beach Handball Championship –
