= 2019 South American Beach Games =

International multi-sport event

- Host city: Rosario, Argentina
- Nations: 14
- Events: 13 sports
- Opening: 14 March 2019
- Closing: 23 March 2019
- Opened by: Mauricio Macri
- Torch lighter: Cecilia Carranza Saroli
- Ceremony venue: Monumento Nacional a la Bandera

The 2019 South American Beach Games (Spanish:Juegos Suramericanos de Playa), officially the IV South American Beach Games, was an international multi-sport event held in Rosario, Argentina from March 14 – 23. It was the first time of the event in Argentina.

== Participating teams ==
All 14 nations of the Organización Deportiva Suramericana (ODESUR) were expected to compete in these Beach Games.

- Argentina (host)
- Aruba
- Bolivia
- Brazil
- Chile
- Colombia
- Ecuador
- Guyana
- Panama
- Paraguay
- Peru
- Suriname
- Uruguay
- Venezuela

== Sports ==
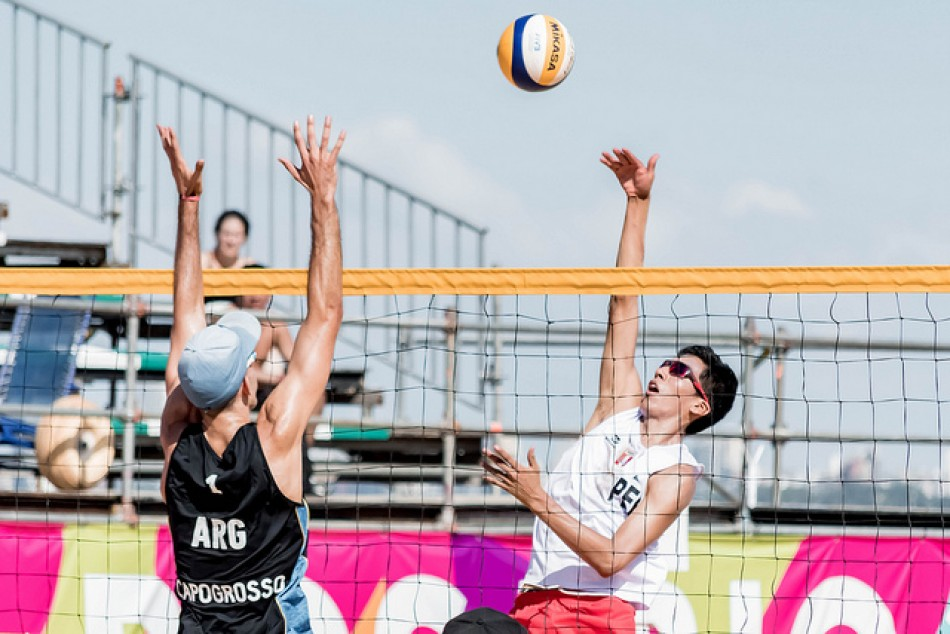
Beach volleyball, Argentina v Peru

- Beach handball (Details)
- Beach football
- Beach rugby
- Beach tennis
- Beach volleyball
- Canoeing
- Coastal rowing
- Open water swimming
- Sailing
- Skateboard
- Stand Up Paddle Surf
- Triathlon
- Water skiing

== Medal table ==
Key:

The host country (Argentina) is highlighted in lavender blue

Final medal tally.

Rank	Nation	Gold	Silver	Bronze	Total
1	Argentina (ARG)*	17	19	13	49
2	Peru (PER)	13	2	4	19
3	Brazil (BRA)	11	9	6	26
4	Chile (CHI)	6	5	9	20
5	Venezuela (VEN)	3	8	9	20
6	Colombia (COL)	2	4	7	13
7	Ecuador (ECU)	1	2	2	5
7	Paraguay (PAR)	1	2	2	5
7	Uruguay (URU)	1	2	2	5
10	Aruba (ARU)	0	2	1	3
Totals (10 entries)		55	55	55	165
