= Uruguay women's national beach handball team =

Uruguay

Information
- Association: Federacion Uruguaya de Handball
- Coach: Maximiliano Malfatti
- Assistant coach: María Pérez

Colours
| Home | Away |

Results

World Championship
- Appearances: 8 (First in 2006)
- Best result: 6th (2012)
- Last updated on Unknown.

The Uruguay women's national beach handball team is the national team of Uruguay. It is governed by the Uruguay Handball Federation and takes part in international beach handball competitions.

== World Championships results ==
| Year | Position |
|---|---|
| (Egypt) 2004 | Did not qualify |
| (Brazil) 2006 | 9th place |
| (Spain) 2008 | 7th place |
| (Turkey) 2010 | Did not qualify |
| (Oman) 2012 | 6th place |
| (Brazil) 2014 | 8th place |
| (Hungary) 2016 | 12th place |
| (Russia) 2018 | 10th place |
| (Greece) 2022 | Qualified |
| (China) 2024 | Did not qualify |
| (Croatia) 2026 | 10th place |
| Total | 7/11 |

=== Other Competitions ===
- 2019 South and Central American Beach Handball Championship – 4th place
- 2022 South and Central American Beach Handball Championship –
- 2024 South and Central American Beach Handball Championship –
- 2026 South and Central American Beach Handball Championship –
- 2023 South American Beach Games –

=== Youth team results ===
- 2022 Youth Beach Handball World Championship – 13th
- 2022 South and Central American Youth Beach Handball Championship –
- 2022 South American Youth Games –
- 2026 Summer Youth Olympics –
