= Paraguay women's national beach handball team =

Paraguay

Information
- Association: Confederacion Paraguaya de Handball
- Coach: José Veloso

Colours
Home	Away

Results

World Championship
- Appearances: 1 (First in 2018)
- Best result: 8th (2018)
- Last updated on Unknown.

The Paraguay women's national beach handball team is the national team of Paraguay. It takes part in international beach handball competitions.

== World Championships results ==
- 2018 – 8th place

=== Other Competitions ===
- 2019 South American Beach Games –
- 2023 South American Beach Games – 5th place
- 2019 South and Central American Beach Handball Championship -
- 2022 South and Central American Beach Handball Championship - 4th place
- 2024 South and Central American Beach Handball Championship - 4th place

=== Youth team results ===
- 2022 South and Central American Youth Beach Handball Championship - 4th
- 2022 South American Youth Games - 4th
