= Croatia men's national beach handball team =

Croatia

Information
- Association: Croatian Handball Federation
- Coach: Mladen Paradžik
- Assistant coach: Mario Močilac

Colours
| Home | Away |

Results

World Games
- Appearances: 5 (First in 2005)
- Best result: (gold) (2022)

World Championship
- Appearances: 11 (First in 2004)
- Best result: (gold) (2008, 2016, 2022, 2024)
- Last updated on Unknown.

Croatia men's national beach handball team
Medal record

Men's beach handball

Representing Croatia

World Championship
| Gold medal – first place | 2008 Spain | |
| Gold medal – first place | 2016 Hungary | |
| Gold medal – first place | 2022 Greece | |
| Gold medal – first place | 2024 China | |
| Silver medal – second place | 2014 Brazil | |
| Silver medal – second place | 2018 Russia | |
| Bronze medal – third place | 2012 Oman | |

European Championship
| Silver medal – second place | 2007 Italy | |
| Gold medal – first place | 2009 Norway | |
| Gold medal – first place | 2011 Croatia | |
| Gold medal – first place | 2013 Denmark | |
| Gold medal – first place | 2015 Spain | |
| Bronze medal – third place | 2017 Croatia | |
| Silver medal – second place | 2021 Bulgaria | |
| Bronze medal – third place | 2025 Turkey | |

World Games
| Gold medal – first place | 2022 Birmingham | Team |
| Silver medal – second place | 2017 Poland | Team |
| Bronze medal – third place | 2005 Germany | Team |
| Bronze medal – third place | 2009 Taiwan | Team |
| Bronze medal – third place | 2013 Colombia | Team |

The Croatia national beach handball team (Croatian: Hrvatska reprezentacija u rukometu na pijesku) is the national team of Croatia. It is governed by the Croatian Handball Federation and takes part in international beach handball competitions.

It was the first Croatian national team to win a gold medal at the World Games. It is four-time World champion (as of 2024). It is the most successful European national team in beach handball.

== Results ==
=== World Championships ===
| Year | Round | Position | Pld | W | L | SW | SL |
|---|---|---|---|---|---|---|---|
| (Egypt) 2004 | Semifinal | 4th | 7 | 4 | 3 | 10 | 6 |
| (Brazil) 2006 | Quarterfinal | 7th | 7 | 4 | 3 | 8 | 9 |
| (Spain) 2008 | Final | 1st place, gold medalist(s) | 7 | 7 | 0 | 14 | 2 |
| (Turkey) 2010 | Consolation | 7th | 9 | 7 | 2 | 21 | 4 |
| (Oman) 2012 | Semifinal | 3rd place, bronze medalist(s) | 10 | 6 | 4 | 15 | 9 |
| (Brazil) 2014 | Final | 2nd place, silver medalist(s) | 10 | 6 | 4 | 14 | 11 |
| (Hungary) 2016 | Final | (gold) | 10 | 9 | 1 | 18 | 8 |
| (Russia) 2018 | Final | 2nd place, silver medalist(s) | 10 | 9 | 1 | 16 | 5 |
| (Italy) 2020 | Cancelled | | | | | | |
| (Greece) 2022 | Final | 1st place, gold medalist(s) | 9 | 9 | 0 | 18 | 2 |
| (China) 2024 | Final | 1st place, gold medalist(s) | 9 | 9 | 0 | 18 | 3 |
| (Croatia) 2026 | Semifinal | 4th | 9 | 4 | 5 | 12 | 10 |
| Total | 11/11 | | 97 | 74 | 23 | 164 | 69 |

=== World Games ===
| Year | Round | Position | Pld | W | L | SW | SL |
|---|---|---|---|---|---|---|---|
| (Japan) 2001 * | Did not qualify | | | | | | |
| (Germany) 2005 * | Semifinal | 3rd place, bronze medalist(s) | 6 | 3 | 3 | 8 | 7 |
| (Taiwan) 2009 * | Semifinal | 3rd place, bronze medalist(s) | 6 | 4 | 2 | 10 | 5 |
| (Colombia) 2013 | Semifinal | 3rd place, bronze medalist(s) | 5 | 2 | 3 | 6 | 7 |
| (Poland) 2017 | Final | 2nd place, silver medalist(s) | 6 | 4 | 2 | 10 | 5 |
| (United States) 2022 | Final | 1st place, gold medalist(s) | 6 | 5 | 1 | 10 | 2 |
| (China) 2025 | Quarterfinal | 5th | 4 | 0 | 4 | 1 | 8 |
| Total | 6/7 | | 33 | 18 | 15 | 45 | 34 |

* invitational sport

=== World Beach Games ===
| Year | Round | Position | Pld | W | L | SW | SL |
|---|---|---|---|---|---|---|---|
| (Qatar) 2019 | Quarterfinal | 5th | 8 | 5 | 3 | 12 | 8 |
| (Indonesia) 2023 | cancelled | | | | | | |
| 2025 | | | | | | | |
| Total | 1/1 | | | | | | |

=== European Championships ===
| Year | Round | Position | Pld | W | L | SW | SL |
|---|---|---|---|---|---|---|---|
| (Italy) 2000 | | | | | | | |
| (Spain) 2002 | Consolation | 12th | 7 | 2 | 5 | 5 | 10 |
| (Turkey) 2004 | Main | 7th | 10 | 4 | 6 | 11 | 13 |
| (Germany) 2006 | Quarterfinal | 6th | 9 | 5 | 4 | 12 | 8 |
| (Italy) 2007 | Final | 2nd place, silver medalist(s) | 11 | 8 | 3 | 18 | 7 |
| (Norway) 2009 | Final | 1st place, gold medalist(s) | 10 | 8 | 2 | 18 | 5 |
| (Croatia) 2011 | Final | 1st place, gold medalist(s) | 11 | 11 | 0 | 22 | 1 |
| (Denmark) 2013 | Final | 1st place, gold medalist(s) | 10 | 9 | 1 | 19 | 6 |
| (Spain) 2015 | Final | 1st place, gold medalist(s) | 10 | 9 | 1 | 19 | 4 |
| (Croatia) 2017 | Semifinal | 3rd place, bronze medalist(s) | 11 | 9 | 2 | 20 | 6 |
| (Poland) 2019 | Quarterfinal | 5th | 10 | 9 | 1 | 18 | 3 |
| (Bulgaria) 2021 | Final | 2nd place, silver medalist(s) | 9 | 8 | 1 | 16 | 2 |
| (Portugal) 2023 | Quarterfinal | 7th | 7 | 3 | 4 | 6 | 5 |
| (Turkey) 2025 | Semifinal | 3rd place, bronze medalist(s) | 11 | 8 | 3 | 17 | 12 |
| Total | 13/14 | | 126 | 93 | 33 | 201 | 82 |

=== European Games ===
| Year | Round | Position | Pld | W | L | SW | SL |
|---|---|---|---|---|---|---|---|
| (Poland) 2023 | Quarterfinal | 5th | 5 | 4 | 1 | | |
| Total | 1/1 | | | | | | |

=== Mediterranean Beach Games ===
| Year | Round | Position | Pld | W | L | SW | SL |
|---|---|---|---|---|---|---|---|
| (Italy) 2015 | Did not participate | | | | | | |
| (Greece) 2019 | Semifinal | 3rd place, bronze medalist(s) | | | | | |
| (Greece) 2023 | Final | 1st place, gold medalist(s) | | | | | |
| (Portugal) 2027 | | | | | | | |
| Total | 2/3 | | | | | | |

== Team rosters ==
=== Medalist teams ===
- World Championships 2018:

Mario Lacković (right wing), Tomislav Lauš (defender), Filip Goričanec (specialist), Ivan Jurić (left wing), Josip Leko (pivot), Matej Semren (pivot), David Henigman (goalkeeper), Lucijan Bura (right wing), Josip Matezović (left wing), Dominik Marković (goalkeeper).
Coaching stuff: Mladen Paradžik (head coach), Mario Močilac (coach), Goran Krušelj (physiotherapist), SIniša Ostoić (chief of delegation).

- World Championships 2022:

Dominik Marković, Borna Kolić, Ivan Dumenčić, Ivan Jurić, Filip Goričanec, Lucian Bura, Josip Dukeš, Valentino Valentaković, Josip Leko, Nikola Finek.
Coach: Mladen Paradžik (head coach)

- World Championships 2024:

Stipe Maleničić, Filip Dominik Hančić, Ivan Dumenčić, Ivan Jurić, Josip Dukeš, Valentino Valentaković, Nikola Finek, Lucian Bura, Josip Leko, Filip Goričanec.
Coaching stuff: Mladen Paradžik (head cocah), Mario Močilac (coach), Goran Krušelj (physiotherapist), Ante Taraš.

=== Non-medalist teams ===
- 2023 European Games:

Ivan Jurić, Ivan Dumenčić, Nikola Finek, Valentino Valentaković, Filip Goričanec, Dominik Marković, Tomislav Lauš, Filip Dominik Hančić, Lucian Bura, Josip Đukes, Josip Topić, Sebastian Lučić.
Coach: Mladen Paradžik

== Awards ==
- Best goalkeeper of the tournament: Igor Totić (2012 WC, 2014 WC), Dominik Marković (2022 WG)
- Best right wing of the tournament: Lucian Bura (2018 WC, 2022 WG, 2022 WC, 2024 WC)
- Best left wing of the tournament: Ivan Jurić (2016 WC, 2018 WC)
- Best pivot of the tournament: Ivan Jukić (2026 WC)
- MVP of the tournament: Ivan Jurić (2016 WC), Lucian Bura (2022 WC), Ivan Dumenčić (2024 WC)
- Fair play award: 2024 WC

Abbreviations: WG − World Games · WC − World Championship

== Record against other teams ==
As of 16 July 2022, after 2022 WG

Key
| Positive total balance (more wins) |
| Neutral total balance (equal W/L ratio) |
| Negative total balance (more losses) |

| National team | Total | | | World Games | | | World Beach Games | | | World Championship | | | European Championship | | | Mediterranean Beach Games | | | Qualifications | | |
| National team | Pld | W | L | Pld | W | L | Pld | W | L | Pld | W | L | Pld | W | L | Pld | W | L | Pld | W | L |
|---|---|---|---|---|---|---|---|---|---|---|---|---|---|---|---|---|---|---|---|---|---|
| Argentina | 4 | 3 | 1 | 1 | 0 | 1 | 0 | 0 | 0 | 3 | 3 | 0 | — | — | — | — | — | — | | | |
| Australia | 4 | 4 | 0 | 1 | 1 | 0 | 1 | 1 | 0 | 2 | 2 | 0 | — | — | — | — | — | — | | | |
| Bahrain | 2 | 1 | 1 | 0 | 0 | 0 | 0 | 0 | 0 | 2 | 1 | 1 | — | — | — | — | — | — | | | |
| Belarus | 1 | 1 | 0 | 0 | 0 | 0 | 0 | 0 | 0 | 0 | 0 | 0 | 1 | 1 | 0 | — | — | — | | | |
| Brazil | 15 | 3 | 12 | 4 | 0 | 4 | 1 | 0 | 1 | 10 | 3 | 7 | — | — | — | — | — | — | | | |
| Bulgaria | 3 | 3 | 0 | 0 | 0 | 0 | 0 | 0 | 0 | 0 | 0 | 0 | 3 | 3 | 0 | — | — | — | | | |
| Chinese Taipei | 1 | 1 | 0 | 1 | 1 | 0 | 0 | 0 | 0 | 0 | 0 | 0 | — | — | — | — | — | — | | | |
| Cyprus | 4 | 3 | 1 | 0 | 0 | 0 | 0 | 0 | 0 | 0 | 0 | 0 | 4 | 3 | 1 | 0 | 0 | 0 | | | |
| Denmark | 10 | 7 | 3 | 0 | 0 | 0 | 0 | 0 | 0 | 5 | 3 | 2 | 5 | 4 | 1 | — | — | — | | | |
| Ecuador | 1 | 1 | 0 | 0 | 0 | 0 | 0 | 0 | 0 | 1 | 1 | 0 | — | — | — | — | — | — | | | |
| Egypt | 7 | 6 | 1 | 2 | 2 | 0 | 0 | 0 | 0 | 5 | 4 | 1 | — | — | — | 0 | 0 | 0 | | | |
| France | 2 | 2 | 0 | 0 | 0 | 0 | 0 | 0 | 0 | 0 | 0 | 0 | 2 | 2 | 0 | 0 | 0 | 0 | | | |
| Germany | 7 | 6 | 1 | 1 | 1 | 0 | 0 | 0 | 0 | 1 | 1 | 0 | 5 | 4 | 1 | — | — | — | | | |
| Greece | 2 | 2 | 0 | 0 | 0 | 0 | 0 | 0 | 0 | 2 | 2 | 0 | 0 | 0 | 0 | 0 | 0 | 0 | | | |
| Hungary | 17 | 11 | 6 | 1 | 0 | 1 | 2 | 1 | 1 | 5 | 4 | 1 | 9 | 6 | 3 | — | — | — | | | |
| Iran | 2 | 2 | 0 | 0 | 0 | 0 | 0 | 0 | 0 | 2 | 2 | 0 | — | — | — | — | — | — | | | |
| Italy | 4 | 3 | 1 | 0 | 0 | 0 | 0 | 0 | 0 | 0 | 0 | 0 | 4 | 3 | 1 | 0 | 0 | 0 | | | |
| Kuwait | 1 | 1 | 0 | 0 | 0 | 0 | 0 | 0 | 0 | 1 | 1 | 0 | — | — | — | — | — | — | | | |
| Libya | 1 | 1 | 0 | 0 | 0 | 0 | 0 | 0 | 0 | 1 | 1 | 0 | — | — | — | 0 | 0 | 0 | | | |
| New Zealand | 1 | 1 | 0 | 1 | 1 | 0 | 0 | 0 | 0 | 0 | 0 | 0 | — | — | — | — | — | — | | | |
| North Macedonia | 3 | 3 | 0 | 0 | 0 | 0 | 0 | 0 | 0 | 0 | 0 | 0 | 3 | 3 | 0 | 0 | 0 | 0 | | | |
| Norway | 9 | 8 | 1 | 0 | 0 | 0 | 0 | 0 | 0 | 1 | 1 | 0 | 8 | 7 | 1 | — | — | — | | | |
| Oman | 4 | 4 | 0 | 1 | 1 | 0 | 0 | 0 | 0 | 3 | 3 | 0 | — | — | — | — | — | — | | | |
| Pakistan | 1 | 1 | 0 | 1 | 1 | 0 | 0 | 0 | 0 | 0 | 0 | 0 | — | — | — | — | — | — | | | |
| Poland | 7 | 7 | 0 | 1 | 1 | 0 | 0 | 0 | 0 | 0 | 0 | 0 | 6 | 6 | 0 | — | — | — | | | |
| Portugal | 1 | 1 | 0 | 0 | 0 | 0 | 0 | 0 | 0 | 0 | 0 | 0 | 1 | 1 | 0 | 0 | 0 | 0 | | | |
| Puerto Rico | 1 | 1 | 0 | 1 | 1 | 0 | 0 | 0 | 0 | 0 | 0 | 0 | — | — | — | — | — | — | | | |
| Qatar | 10 | 7 | 3 | 5 | 4 | 1 | 1 | 0 | 1 | 4 | 3 | 1 | — | — | — | — | — | — | | | |
| Russia | 22 | 12 | 10 | 1 | 0 | 1 | 0 | 0 | 0 | 8 | 4 | 4 | 13 | 8 | 5 | — | — | — | | | |
| Serbia | 9 | 7 | 2 | 0 | 0 | 0 | 0 | 0 | 0 | 2 | 2 | 0 | 7 | 5 | 2 | 0 | 0 | 0 | | | |
| Spain | 17 | 14 | 3 | 1 | 0 | 1 | 1 | 1 | 0 | 8 | 7 | 1 | 7 | 6 | 1 | 0 | 0 | 0 | | | |
| Sweden | 7 | 5 | 2 | 0 | 0 | 0 | 0 | 0 | 0 | 0 | 0 | 0 | 7 | 5 | 2 | — | — | — | | | |
| Switzerland | 5 | 4 | 1 | 0 | 0 | 0 | 0 | 0 | 0 | 0 | 0 | 0 | 5 | 4 | 1 | — | — | — | | | |
| Thailand | 1 | 1 | 0 | 1 | 1 | 0 | 0 | 0 | 0 | 0 | 0 | 0 | — | — | — | — | — | — | | | |
| Tunisia | 1 | 1 | 0 | 0 | 0 | 0 | 1 | 1 | 0 | 0 | 0 | 0 | — | — | — | 0 | 0 | 0 | | | |
| Turkey | 8 | 5 | 3 | 2 | 1 | 1 | 0 | 0 | 0 | 1 | 1 | 0 | 5 | 3 | 2 | 0 | 0 | 0 | | | |
| Ukraine | 15 | 9 | 6 | 1 | 0 | 1 | 0 | 0 | 0 | 3 | 3 | 0 | 11 | 6 | 5 | — | — | — | | | |
| United States | 2 | 2 | 0 | 1 | 1 | 0 | 0 | 0 | 0 | 1 | 1 | 0 | — | — | — | — | — | — | | | |
| Uruguay | 6 | 6 | 0 | 0 | 0 | 0 | 1 | 1 | 0 | 5 | 5 | 0 | — | — | — | — | — | — | | | |
| Venezuela | 1 | 1 | 0 | 1 | 1 | 0 | 0 | 0 | 0 | 0 | 0 | 0 | — | — | — | — | — | — | | | |
| Vietnam | 1 | 1 | 0 | 0 | 0 | 0 | 0 | 0 | 0 | 1 | 1 | 0 | — | — | — | — | — | — | | | |
| Total (41) | 220 | 162 | 58 | | | | | | | | | | | | | | | | | | |

== See also ==
- Croatia women's national beach handball team
