= 2021 European Beach Handball Championship =

International sports event

- Events: 2

The 2021 European Beach Handball Championship was held in Varna, Bulgaria from 13 to 18 July 2021. The tournament was held at Varna's South Beach area, where four courts were. All results, schedules and news regarding the EHF Beach Handball EURO can be found at beacheuro.eurohandball.com.

== Format ==
Men's competition starts in the preliminary round with eighteen teams, split into two groups of five and two groups of four. Top three teams of each group advances to the Main round where they are split into two groups of six, while fourth and fifth teams are sent to the Consolation round in two groups of three. Top four teams in each group of the Main round advances to quarterfinals followed by semi finals and finals. Teams eliminated in the Main round continues to play against teams from the Consolation round. Matches are played for all of eighteen places available. Groups in the preliminary round are playing a round-robin, while in the Main round they are playing only against teams they haven't played before, as the results of preliminary round are brought forward into the Main round only in matches of teams that have advanced.

Women's competition starts in the preliminary round with seventeen teams, split into one group of five and three groups of four. Top three teams of each group advances to the Main round where they are split into two groups of six, while fourth and fifth teams are sent to the Consolation round in single groups of five. Top four teams in each group of the Main round advances to quarterfinals followed by semi finals and finals. Teams eliminated in the Main round continues to play against each other. Matches are played for all of seventeen places available. Groups in the preliminary round are playing a round-robin, while in the Main round they are playing only against teams they haven't played before, as the results of preliminary round are brought forward into the Main round only in matches of teams that have advanced.

Matches were played in sets, the team that wins two sets is the winner of a match. When teams are equal in points the head-to-head result is decisive.

== Men ==
=== Preliminary round ===
Team advance to Main round
Team advance to Consolation round

==== Group A ====
Team	Pld	W	L	SW	SL	SD	PF	PF	PD	Pts
Denmark	4	4	0	8	0	+8	175	124	+51	8
Spain	4	3	1	6	2	+4	169	142	+27	6
Norway	4	2	2	4	5	-1	158	168	-10	4
Turkey	4	1	3	3	6	-3	164	189	-25	2
Romania	4	0	4	0	8	-8	127	170	-43	0

Team 1	Team 2	Score	1st Set	2nd Set	SO
Round 1
Spain	Norway	2:0	28:19	19:12	
Denmark	Romania	2:0	24:11	22:13	
Round 2
Romania	Spain	0:2	20:21	13:19	
Denmark	Turkey	2:0	21:14	23:18	
Round 3
Romania	Turkey	0:2	20:22	22:24	
Norway	Denmark	0:2	18:24	16:19	
Round 4
Norway	Romania	2:0	23:14	15:14	
Turkey	Spain	0:2	19:21	17:27	
Round 5
Turkey	Norway	1:2	24:22	20:24	6:9
Spain	Denmark	0:2	18:23	16:19	

==== Group B ====
Team	Pld	W	L	SW	SL	SD	PF	PF	PD	Pts
France	4	4	0	8	1	+7	186	146	+40	8
Hungary	4	3	1	7	2	+5	175	123	+52	6
Ukraine	4	2	2	4	5	-1	124	149	-25	4
Italy	4	1	3	1	6	-5	142	164	-22	2
Greece	4	0	4	2	8	-6	141	186	-45	0

Team 1	Team 2	Score	1st Set	2nd Set	SO
Round 1
Hungary	France	1:2	23:13	24:26	12:13
Ukraine	Italy	2:0	25:24	18:16	
Round 2
Italy	Hungary	0:2	14:17	14:19	
Ukraine	Greece	2:1	20:21	20:16	5:4
Round 3
Italy	Greece	2:0	23:20	19:18	
France	Ukraine	2:0	18:14	15:10	
Round 4
France	Italy	2:0	24:14	23:18	
Greece	Hungary	0:2	18:27	13:18	
Round 5
Greece	France	0:2	15:30	16:24	
Hungary	Ukraine	2:0	15:2	20:10	

==== Group C ====
Team	Pld	W	L	SW	SL	SD	PF	PF	PD	Pts
Croatia	3	3	0	6	0	+6	142	106	+36	6
Poland	3	2	1	4	2	+2	119	122	-3	4
Sweden	3	1	2	2	4	-2	115	114	+1	2
Bulgaria	3	0	3	0	6	-6	83	117	-34	0

Team 1	Team 2	Score	1st Set	2nd Set	SO
Round 1
Croatia	Sweden	2:0	25:16	23:20	
Poland	Bulgaria	2:0	14:11	21:20	
Round 2
Poland	Sweden	2:0	22:20	22:18	
Bulgaria	Croatia	0:2	12:15	18:26	
Round 3
Sweden	Bulgaria	2:0	22:9	19:13	
Croatia	Poland	2:0	29:20	24:20	

==== Group D ====
Team	Pld	W	L	SW	SL	SD	PF	PF	PD	Pts
Russia	3	3	0	6	0	+6	124	100	+24	6
Portugal	3	2	1	4	3	+1	125	115	+10	4
Germany	3	1	2	3	5	-1	121	128	-7	2
Netherlands	3	0	3	1	6	-5	101	128	-27	0

Team 1	Team 2	Score	1st Set	2nd Set	SO
Round 1
Germany	Netherlands	2:0	18:11	14:25	10:4
Russia	Portugal	2:0	19:14	24:18	
Round 2
Germany	Portugal	1:2	24:16	14:25	8:10
Netherlands	Russia	0:2	18:23	17:21	
Round 3
Portugal	Netherlands	2:0	18:12	24:14	
Russia	Germany	2:0	19:17	18:16	

=== Main round ===
Team advance to Quarterfinals
Team advance to Cross matches 9−16

==== Group I ====
Team	Pld	W	L	SW	SL	SD	PF	PF	PD	Pts
Denmark	5	5	0	10	1	+9	227	151	+76	10
Spain	5	3	2	7	4	+3	220	192	+28	6
France	5	3	2	6	6	0	177	215	-38	6
Norway	5	2	3	5	7	-2	209	211	-2	4
Hungary	5	2	3	6	7	-1	225	204	+21	4
Ukraine	5	0	5	1	10	-9	136	221	-85	0

Team 1	Team 2	Score	1st Set	2nd Set	SO
Round 1
Denmark	Hungary	2:1	17:14	20:21	7:6
France	Norway	2:1	22:20	10:16	9:8
Spain	Ukraine	2:0	22:16	21:18	
Round 2
France	Spain	0:2	18:19	12:24	
Ukraine	Denmark	0:2	10:30	11:23	
Hungary	Norway	0:2	17:22	18:21	
Round 3
Denmark	France	2:0	22:14	23:7	
Norway	Ukraine	2:1	20:23	27:16	10:6
Spain	Hungary	1:2	22:24	25:24	6:7

==== Group II ====
Team	Pld	W	L	SW	SL	SD	PF	PF	PD	Pts
Croatia	5	5	0	10	0	+10	238	191	+47	10
Russia	5	4	1	8	3	+5	208	195	+13	8
Poland	5	3	2	7	5	+2	200	202	-2	6
Portugal	5	2	3	4	8	-4	207	218	-11	4
Germany	5	1	4	4	8	-4	204	212	-8	2
Sweden	5	0	5	1	10	-9	204	243	-39	0

Team 1	Team 2	Score	1st Set	2nd Set	SO
Round 1
Croatia	Portugal	2:0	17:16	26:25	
Russia	Sweden	2:0	28:26	20:16	
Poland	Germany	2:1	14:21	22:16	10:8
Round 2
Germany	Croatia	0:2	20:26	12:19	
Portugal	Sweden	2:1	24:27	23:22	8:6
Russia	Poland	2:1	14:12	15:19	9:8
Round 3
Croatia	Russia	2:0	24:22	25:20	
Sweden	Germany	0:2	20:27	13:21	
Poland	Portugal	2:0	20:18	11:10	

=== Consolation round ===
Team advance to Cross matches 9−16
Team advance to Match for 17th place

==== Group III ====
Team	Pld	W	L	SW	SL	SD	PF	PF	PD	Pts
Greece	2	2	0	4	1	+3	86	79	+7	4
Turkey	2	1	1	3	2	+1	85	69	+16	2
Bulgaria	2	0	2	0	4	-4	56	79	-23	0

Team 1	Team 2	Score	1st Set	2nd Set	SO
Round 1
Greece	Turkey	2:1	20:19	14:21	10:8
Round 2
Bulgaria	Greece	0:2	14:20	17:22	
Round 3
Turkey	Bulgaria	2:0	20:11	17:14	

==== Group IV ====
Team	Pld	W	L	SW	SL	SD	PF	PF	PD	Pts
Italy	2	1	1	3	2	+1	82	81	+1	2
Netherlands	2	1	1	2	2	0	86	73	+13	2
Romania	2	1	1	2	3	-1	75	89	-14	2

Team 1	Team 2	Score	1st Set	2nd Set	SO
Round 1
Romania	Italy	2:1	24:20	13:19	6:2
Round 2
Netherlands	Romania	2:0	29:18	19:14	
Round 3
Italy	Netherlands	2:0	17:16	24:22	

=== Placement round ===
Quarterfinals
Denmark	2
Portugal	0
Russia	2
France	0
Croatia	2
Norway	0
Spain	2
Poland	1

Semifinals
Denmark	2
Russia	1
Croatia	2
Spain	0

Finale
Denmark	2
Croatia	0
3rd place
Russia	2
Spain	1

Cross matches 5−8
Portugal	2
France	1
Norway	2
Poland	0

5th place
Portugal	2
Norway	0
7th place
France	0
Poland	2

Cross matches 9−16
Hungary	2
Netherlands	0
Sweden	2
Greece	1
Germany	2
Turkey	0
Ukraine	1
Italy	2

Cross matches 9−12
Hungary	2
Sweden	0
Germany	0
Italy	2

9th place
Hungary	2
Italy	0
11th place
Sweden	2
Germany	0

Cross matches 13−16
Netherlands	2
Greece	1
Turkey	0
Ukraine	2

13th place
Netherlands	2
Ukraine	0
15th place
Greece	1
Turkey	2

17th place
Bulgaria	0
Romania	2

=== Final standings ===
Place	Team
1st place, gold medalist(s)	Denmark
2nd place, silver medalist(s)	Croatia
3rd place, bronze medalist(s)	Russia
4	Spain
5	Portugal
6	Norway
7	Poland
8	France
9	Hungary
10	Italy
11	Sweden
12	Germany
13	Netherlands
14	Ukraine
15	Turkey
16	Greece
17	Romania
18	Bulgaria

Team qualified to the 2022 Men's Beach Handball World Championships and the 2023 European Beach Handball Championship
Team qualified to the 2022 Men's Beach Handball World Championships as host

== Women ==
=== Preliminary round ===
Team advance to Main round
Team advance to Consolation round

==== Group A ====
Team	Pld	W	L	SW	SL	SD	PF	PF	PD	Pts
Spain	4	3	1	7	2	+5	182	107	+75	6
Denmark	4	3	1	7	3	+4	179	133	+46	6
Turkey	4	2	2	4	5	-1	127	145	-18	4
Ukraine	4	2	2	5	5	0	169	163	+6	4
Bulgaria	4	0	4	0	8	-8	96	205	-109	0

Team 1	Team 2	Score	1st Set	2nd Set	SO
Round 1
Spain	Denmark	1:2	22:17	14:17	6:8
Ukraine	Turkey	1:2	14:17	18:17	4:7
Round 2
Turkey	Spain	0:2	14:27	4:21	
Ukraine	Bulgaria	2:0	26:18	32:13	
Round 3
Turkey	Bulgaria	2:0	21:15	20:9	
Denmark	Ukraine	1:2	25:14	18:26	4:7
Round 4
Denmark	Turkey	2:0	21:12	16:15	
Bulgaria	Spain	0:2	13:26	11:22	
Round 5
Bulgaria	Denmark	0:2	7:30	10:28	
Spain	Ukraine	2:0	23:12	21:16	

==== Group B ====
Team	Pld	W	L	SW	SL	SD	PF	PF	PD	Pts
Norway	3	3	0	6	1	+5	138	104	+34	6
Croatia	3	2	1	4	4	0	132	145	-13	4
Hungary	3	1	2	3	4	-1	112	109	+3	2
Italy	3	0	3	2	6	-4	115	139	-24	0

Team 1	Team 2	Score	1st Set	2nd Set	SO
Round 1
Hungary	Norway	0:2	18:27	16:18	
Croatia	Italy	2:1	25:22	18:19	15:14
Round 2
Croatia	Norway	0:2	17:23	16:23	
Italy	Hungary	0:2	10:19	13:15	
Round 3
Hungary	Croatia	1:2	20:14	14:15	10:12
Norway	Italy	2:1	19:12	18:19	10:6

==== Group C ====
Team	Pld	W	L	SW	SL	SD	PF	PF	PD	Pts
Germany	3	3	0	6	0	+6	110	69	+41	6
Netherlands	3	2	1	4	2	+2	104	85	+19	4
Portugal	3	1	2	2	4	-2	79	69	+10	2
Romania	3	0	3	0	6	-6	58	128	-70	0

Team 1	Team 2	Score	1st Set	2nd Set	SO
Round 1
Germany	Romania	2:0	18:8	22:13	
Netherlands	Portugal	2:0	13:12	12:10	
Round 2
Germany	Portugal	2:0	16:10	14:8	
Romania	Netherlands	0:2	16:29	7:20	
Round 3
Portugal	Romania	2:0	17:6	22:8	
Netherlands	Germany	0:2	15:16	15:24	

==== Group D ====
Team	Pld	W	L	SW	SL	SD	PF	PF	PD	Pts
Poland	3	2	1	5	3	+2	116	110	+6	4
France	3	2	1	5	3	+2	117	118	-1	4
Greece	3	2	1	4	3	+1	111	98	+13	4
Russia	3	0	3	1	6	-5	98	116	-18	0

Team 1	Team 2	Score	1st Set	2nd Set	SO
Round 1
Russia	Greece	0:2	9:16	14:16	
Poland	France	1:2	13:17	20:13	4:7
Round 2
Poland	Greece	2:0	17:16	21:20	
France	Russia	2:0	25:24	18:14	
Round 3
Greece	France	2:1	17:16	18:19	8:2
Russia	Poland	1:2	15:14	18:22	4:5

=== Main round ===
Team advance to Quarterfinals
Team advance to Cross matches 9−12

==== Group I ====
Team	Pld	W	L	SW	SL	SD	PF	PF	PD	Pts
Denmark	5	5	0	10	3	+7	217	194	+23	10
Spain	5	3	2	8	5	+3	225	177	+48	6
Norway	5	3	2	7	4	+3	213	185	+28	6
Hungary	5	2	3	6	7	-1	210	209	+1	4
Turkey	5	1	4	2	9	-7	147	217	-70	2
Croatia	5	1	4	4	9	-5	199	229	-30	2

Team 1	Team 2	Score	1st Set	2nd Set	SO
Round 1
Spain	Hungary	1:2	20:21	22:16	6:7
Denmark	Croatia	2:1	24:15	24:25	9:8
Norway	Turkey	2:0	13:12	26:12	
Round 2
Hungary	Denmark	1:2	12:14	23:18	6:10
Norway	Spain	1:2	23:14	14:24	10:12
Croatia	Turkey	1:2	18:22	24:16	4:7
Round 3
Turkey	Hungary	0:2	15:21	18:26	
Spain	Croatia	2:0	18:16	19:15	
Denmark	Norway	2:0	25:18	19:18	

==== Group II ====
Team	Pld	W	L	SW	SL	SD	PF	PF	PD	Pts
Germany	5	5	0	10	0	+10	174	124	+50	10
Netherlands	5	3	2	7	5	+2	186	182	+6	6
Portugal	5	3	2	6	5	+1	165	143	+22	6
Poland	5	2	3	6	7	-1	173	178	-5	6
Greece	5	1	4	3	9	-6	179	205	-26	2
France	5	1	4	3	9	-6	160	205	-45	2

Team 1	Team 2	Score	1st Set	2nd Set	SO
Round 1
Germany	France	2:0	22:9	22:17	
Poland	Portugal	1:2	16:20	16:14	6:7
Netherlands	Greece	2:1	20:22	19:18	7:6
Round 2
Greece	Germany	0:2	11:16	20:22	
France	Portugal	0:2	18:24	9:14	
Poland	Netherlands	2:1	18:16	16:20	7:6
Round 3
Netherlands	France	2:0	23:19	20:14	
Portugal	Greece	2:0	28:9	18:14	
Germany	Poland	2:0	11:10	11:9	

=== Consolation round ===
Team advance to Match for 13th place
Team advance to Match for 15th place
Team finished at 17th place

==== Group III ====
Team	Pld	W	L	SW	SL	SD	PF	PF	PD	Pts
Ukraine	4	4	0	8	1	+7	190	135	+55	8
Italy	4	3	1	7	3	+4	195	179	+16	6
Russia	4	2	2	5	6	-1	172	171	0	4
Bulgaria	4	1	3	3	7	-4	154	194	-40	2
Romania	4	0	4	2	8	-6	148	179	-31	0

Team 1	Team 2	Score	1st Set	2nd Set	SO
Round 1
Romania	Russia	1:2	17:16	12:18	10:11
Bulgaria	Italy	0:2	22:26	20:28	
Round 2
Russia	Ukraine	0:2	16:20	14:22	
Italy	Romania	2:0	24:22	26:16	
Round 3
Romania	Bulgaria	1:2	18:19	16:15	4:6
Ukraine	Italy	2:1	12:18	24:19	10:4
Round 4
Ukraine	Romania	2:0	22:20	22:13	
Russia	Bulgaria	2:1	25:17	14:22	5:2
Round 5
Italy	Russia	2:1	24:20	18:28	8:5

=== Placement round ===
Quarterfinals
Germany	2
Hungary	1
Spain	2
Portugal	0
Denmark	2
Poland	0
Netherlands	1
Norway	2

Semifinals
Germany	2
Spain	1
Denmark	2
Norway	0

Finale
Germany	2
Denmark	0
3rd place
Spain	2
Norway	0

Cross matches 5−8
Hungary	1
Portugal	2
Poland	1
Netherlands	2

5th place
Portugal	2
Netherlands	1
7th place
Hungary	2
Poland	0

Cross matches 9−12
Croatia	0
Greece	2
Turkey	2
France	1

9th place
Greece	2
Turkey	0
11th place
Croatia	2
France	1

13th place
Ukraine	0
Italy	2

15th place
Russia	2
Bulgaria	0

=== Final standings ===
Place	Team
1st place, gold medalist(s)	Germany
2nd place, silver medalist(s)	Denmark
3rd place, bronze medalist(s)	Spain
4	Norway
5	Portugal
6	Netherlands
7	Hungary
8	Poland
9	Greece
10	Turkey
11	Croatia
12	France
13	Italy
14	Ukraine
15	Russia
16	Bulgaria
17	Romania

Team qualified to the 2022 Women's Beach Handball World Championships and the 2023 European Beach Handball Championship
Team qualified to the 2022 Women's Beach Handball World Championships as host

== Broadcasting ==
List of broadcasters and territories:

Country	Channel
Albania Bosnia and Herzegovina Croatia Kosovo Montenegro North Macedonia Serbia Slovenia	Arena Sport
Belarus Estonia Moldova Latvia Lithuania Ukraine	Poverkhnost
Bulgaria	A1
Bulgaria	B1B
Cyprus	Cyta
Czech Republic Slovakia	AMC
Denmark Faroe Islands Finland Norway Sweden	Nent
Germany	Sportdeutschland.TV
Greece	INA TV
Hungary	MTVA
Poland	Eurosport
Portugal	Sport TV
Australia Cambodia Canada Hong Kong Indonesia Laos Madagascar Malaysia Mauritius New Zealand Philippines Singapore Thailand Timor-Leste Turkey United States	beIN Sports
Worldwide	EHFTV(subject to geoblocking)

== Controversies ==
After the European Handball Federation (EHF) fined the Norwegian women's team for wearing shorts like the men's team instead of the required bikini bottom, the EHF said it would donate the amount paid by the Norwegian team "to a major international sports foundation which supports equality for women and girls in sports." American singer Pink said she offered to pay the fine.
