= France men's national beach handball team =

France

Information
- Association: French Handball Federation
- Coach: Patrick Teyssier
- Assistant coach: Paul Mourioux

Colours
Home	Away

Results

World Championship
- Appearances: 1 (First in 2026)
- Best result: 10th (2026)
- Last updated on Unknown.

The France national beach handball team is the national team of France. It is governed by the French Handball Federation and takes part in international beach handball competitions.

== World Championship results ==
Year	Position
(Egypt) 2004	Did not qualify
(Brazil) 2006	Did not qualify
(Spain) 2008	Did not qualify
(Turkey) 2010	Did not qualify
(Oman) 2012	Did not qualify
(Brazil) 2014	Did not qualify
(Hungary) 2016	Did not qualify
(Russia) 2018	Did not qualify
(Italy) 2020	Cancelled
(Greece) 2022	Did not qualify
(China) 2024	Did not qualify
(Croatia) 2026	10th place
Total	1/11
