= Italy men's national beach handball team =

Italy

Information
- Association: Italian Handball Federation
- Coach: Pasquale Maione
- Assistant coach: Vincenzo Laera

Colours
Home	Away

Results

World Championship
- Appearances: 1 (First in 2026)
- Best result: 11th (2026)
- Last updated on Unknown.

The Italy national beach handball team is the national team of Italy. It is governed by the Italian Handball Federation and takes part in international beach handball competitions.

== World Championship results ==
Year	Position
(Egypt) 2004	Did not qualify
(Brazil) 2006	Did not qualify
(Spain) 2008	Did not qualify
(Turkey) 2010	Did not qualify
(Oman) 2012	Did not qualify
(Brazil) 2014	Did not qualify
(Hungary) 2016	Did not qualify
(Russia) 2018	Did not qualify
(Italy) 2020	Cancelled
(Greece) 2022	Did not qualify
(China) 2024	Did not qualify
(Croatia) 2026	11th place
Total	1/11
