= Turkey national beach handball team =

Turkey national beach handball team may refer to

- Turkey men's national beach handball team
- Turkey women's national beach handball team
