= Spain national beach handball team =

Spain national beach handball team may refer to

- Spain men's national beach handball team
- Spain women's national beach handball team
