= Turkey men's national beach handball team =

Turkey

Information
- Association: Turkey Handball Federation

Colours
Home	Away

Results

World Games
- Appearances: 2 (First in 2009)
- Best result: 7th (2005, 2009)

World Championship
- Appearances: 4 (First in 2004)
- Best result: 2nd (2006)
- Last updated on Unknown.

Turkey men's national beach handball team
Medal record

Men's beach handball

Representing Turkey

World Championship
Silver medal – second place	2004 Egypt	
Silver medal – second place	2006 Brazil	
Bronze medal – third place	2010 Turkey	

European Championship
Bronze medal – third place	2004 Turkey	
Bronze medal – third place	2006 Germany	

The Turkey national beach handball team represents Turkey in international beach handball competitions. It is governed by the Turkey Handball Federation.

== Results ==
They finished second at the 2013 European Championship, in Randers, Denmark, losing in the final to Hungary and received the silver medal.

=== World Championships ===
Year	Position
(Egypt) 2004	2nd
(Brazil) 2006	2nd
(Spain) 2008	6th
(Turkey) 2010	3rd
(Oman) 2012	Did not qualify
(Brazil) 2014	Did not qualify
(Hungary) 2016	Did not qualify
(Russia) 2018	Did not qualify
(Italy) 2020	Cancelled
(Greece) 2022	Did not qualify
(China) 2024	Did not qualify
Total	4/10

=== World Games ===
Year	Position
(Japan) 2001	—
(Germany) 2005	7th
(Taiwan) 2009	7th
(Colombia) 2013	—
(Poland) 2017	—
(United States) 2022	—
(China) 2025	—
Total	2/7

== See also ==
- Turkey women's national beach handball team
