= Puerto Rico men's national beach handball team =

Puerto Rico

Information
- Association: Federacion de Balonmano de Puerto Rico
- Coach: Camilo Estévez
- Assistant coach: Dayna Milete

Colours
Home	Away

Results

World Championship
- Appearances: 3 (First in 2022)
- Best result: 16th (2022, 2024, 2026)
- Last updated on Unknown.

The Puerto Rico national beach handball team is the national team of Puerto Rico. It is governed by the Federacion de Balonmano de Puerto Rico and takes part in international beach handball competitions.

== World Championship results ==
Year	Position
(Egypt) 2004	Did not qualify
(Brazil) 2006	Did not qualify
(Spain) 2008	Did not qualify
(Turkey) 2010	Did not qualify
(Oman) 2012	Did not qualify
(Brazil) 2014	Did not qualify
(Hungary) 2016	Did not qualify
(Russia) 2018	Did not qualify
(Italy) 2020	Cancelled
(Greece) 2022	16th place
(China) 2024	16th place
(Croatia) 2026	16th place
Total	3/11
