= 2026 Men's Beach Handball World Championships =

Tournament details
- Host country: Croatia
- Venue: Zagreb
- Dates: 23–28 June
- Teams: 16 (from 6 confederations)

Final positions
- Champions: Germany (1st title)
- Runners-up: Brazil
- Third place: Argentina
- Fourth place: Croatia

Tournament statistics
- Top scorers: (Denmark) Martin Andersen (153 points)

The 2026 Men's Beach Handball World Championships was the 11th edition of the championship, held in Zagreb, Croatia from 23 to 28 June 2026, under the aegis of International Handball Federation (IHF).

Germany defeated Brazil in the final to win their first title.

== Qualification ==
16 teams participated.

Qualification	Vacancies	Qualified
Host and defending champion	1	Croatia
2025 Asian Beach Handball Championship	2	Oman; Iran
2025 European Beach Handball Championship	7	Germany; Spain; Hungary; France; Portugal; Denmark; Italy
2026 Oceania Beach Handball Championship	1	Australia
2026 South and Central American Beach Handball Championship	2	Brazil; Argentina
2026 NACHC Beach Handball Championship	2	United States; Puerto Rico
2026 African Beach Handball Championship	1	Tunisia

== Draw ==
The draw took place on 2 May 2026.

=== Seeding ===
Pot 1	Pot 2	Pot 3	Pot 4
Croatia; Germany; Spain; Hungary	France; Portugal; Brazil; Denmark	Argentina; Oman; Tunisia; Iran	United States; Australia; Puerto Rico; Italy

== Preliminary round ==
All times are local (UTC+2).

=== Group A ===
Pos	Team	Pld	W	L	Pts	SW	SL	SR	SPW	SPL	SPR	Qualification
1	Spain	3	3	0	6	6	1	6.000	139	117	1.188	Main round
2	Portugal	3	2	1	4	5	3	1.667	168	137	1.226	Main round
3	Iran	3	1	2	2	3	4	0.750	139	147	0.946	Main round
4	United States	3	0	3	0	0	6	0.000	119	164	0.726	Consolation round

Source: IHF
Rules for classification: 1) Points; 2) Head-to-head points; 3) Head-to-head set difference; 4) Head-to-head points won; 5) Set difference; 6) Points won; 7) Draw.

23 June 2026; 13:00	Portugal	2–0	United States	Court 3 Attendance: 50; Referees: Bulakorn Kongka (THA), Thiwakorn Sangjun (THA)
23 June 2026; 13:00	(29–18, 29–16); Report			Court 3 Attendance: 50; Referees: Bulakorn Kongka (THA), Thiwakorn Sangjun (THA)

23 June 2026; 13:00	Spain	2–0	Iran	Court 4 Attendance: 50; Referees: Corina Radut (ROU), Daniela-Andreea Enache (ROU)
23 June 2026; 13:00	(25–14, 16–14); Report			Court 4 Attendance: 50; Referees: Corina Radut (ROU), Daniela-Andreea Enache (ROU)

23 June 2026; 21:00	Portugal	2–1	Iran	Court 3 Attendance: 150; Referees: Dario Rupčić (CRO), Ivica Botincan (CRO)
23 June 2026; 21:00	(14–16, 19–14, 35–34); Report			Court 3 Attendance: 150; Referees: Dario Rupčić (CRO), Ivica Botincan (CRO)

23 June 2026; 21:00	United States	0–2	Spain	Court 2 Referees: Sidiney dos Santos (BRA), Flavio de Moura (BRA)
23 June 2026; 21:00	(23–32, 24–27); Report			Court 2 Referees: Sidiney dos Santos (BRA), Flavio de Moura (BRA)

24 June 2026; 11:00	Iran	2–0	United States	Court 4 Referees: Bjarne Deiters (GER), Jesper Stumpfe (GER)
24 June 2026; 11:00	(25–20, 22–18); Report			Court 4 Referees: Bjarne Deiters (GER), Jesper Stumpfe (GER)

24 June 2026; 11:00	Spain	2–1	Portugal	Court 2 Attendance: 40; Referees: Sylwia Bartkowiak (POL), Weronika Łakomy (POL)
24 June 2026; 11:00	(12–20, 21–20, 6–2); Report			Court 2 Attendance: 40; Referees: Sylwia Bartkowiak (POL), Weronika Łakomy (POL)

=== Group B ===
Pos	Team	Pld	W	L	Pts	SW	SL	SR	SPW	SPL	SPR	Qualification
1	Hungary	3	3	0	6	6	1	6.000	166	145	1.145	Main round
2	Denmark	3	2	1	4	5	2	2.500	161	128	1.258	Main round
3	Tunisia	3	1	2	2	2	4	0.500	122	135	0.904	Main round
4	Puerto Rico	3	0	3	0	0	6	0.000	108	149	0.725	Consolation round

Source: IHF
Rules for classification: 1) Points; 2) Head-to-head points; 3) Head-to-head set difference; 4) Head-to-head points won; 5) Set difference; 6) Points won; 7) Draw.

23 June 2026; 11:00	Denmark	2–0	Puerto Rico	Court 4 Referees: Bulakorn Kongka (THA), Thiwakorn Sangjun (THA)
23 June 2026; 11:00	(27–20, 22–12); Report			Court 4 Referees: Bulakorn Kongka (THA), Thiwakorn Sangjun (THA)

23 June 2026; 11:00	Hungary	2–0	Tunisia	Court 2 Attendance: 20; Referees: Bjarne Deiters (GER), Jesper Stumpfe (GER)
23 June 2026; 11:00	(25–22, 23–22); Report			Court 2 Attendance: 20; Referees: Bjarne Deiters (GER), Jesper Stumpfe (GER)

23 June 2026; 19:00	Hungary	2–1	Denmark	Central court Attendance: 150; Referees: Dario Rupčić (CRO), Ivica Botincan (CRO)
23 June 2026; 19:00	(27–26, 24–25, 9–6); Report			Central court Attendance: 150; Referees: Dario Rupčić (CRO), Ivica Botincan (CRO)

23 June 2026; 19:00	Tunisia	2–0	Puerto Rico	Court 3 Attendance: 50; Referees: Sidiney dos Santos (BRA), Flavio de Moura (BRA)
23 June 2026; 19:00	(24–16, 18–16); Report			Court 3 Attendance: 50; Referees: Sidiney dos Santos (BRA), Flavio de Moura (BRA)

24 June 2026; 13:00	Denmark	2–0	Tunisia	Court 2 Attendance: 65; Referees: Sylwia Bartkowiak (POL), Weronika Łakomy (POL)
24 June 2026; 13:00	(28–20, 27–16); Report			Court 2 Attendance: 65; Referees: Sylwia Bartkowiak (POL), Weronika Łakomy (POL)

24 June 2026; 13:00	Puerto Rico	0–2	Hungary	Court 4 Referees: Corina Radut (ROU), Daniela-Andreea Enache (ROU)
24 June 2026; 13:00	(24–32, 20–26); Report			Court 4 Referees: Corina Radut (ROU), Daniela-Andreea Enache (ROU)

=== Group C ===
Pos	Team	Pld	W	L	Pts	SW	SL	SR	SPW	SPL	SPR	Qualification
1	Germany	3	3	0	6	6	2	3.000	155	134	1.157	Main round
2	Brazil	3	2	1	4	5	2	2.500	144	117	1.231	Main round
3	Argentina	3	1	2	2	3	5	0.600	123	140	0.879	Main round
4	Italy	3	0	3	0	1	6	0.167	112	143	0.783	Consolation round

Source: IHF
Rules for classification: 1) Points; 2) Head-to-head points; 3) Head-to-head set difference; 4) Head-to-head points won; 5) Set difference; 6) Points won; 7) Draw.

23 June 2026; 11:00	Germany	2–1	Argentina	Central court Referees: Corina Radut (ROU), Daniela-Andreea Enache (ROU)
23 June 2026; 11:00	(25–16, 16–19, 13–12); Report			Central court Referees: Corina Radut (ROU), Daniela-Andreea Enache (ROU)

23 June 2026; 11:00	Brazil	2–0	Italy	Court 3 Referees: José María Galeano (PAR), José María Rodríguez (PAR)
23 June 2026; 11:00	(28–16, 21–18); Report			Court 3 Referees: José María Galeano (PAR), José María Rodríguez (PAR)

23 June 2026; 19:00	Brazil	2–0	Argentina	Court 4 Attendance: 70; Referees: Víctor Rollán (ESP), Sergio Martínez (ESP)
23 June 2026; 19:00	(18–14, 28–18); Report			Court 4 Attendance: 70; Referees: Víctor Rollán (ESP), Sergio Martínez (ESP)

23 June 2026; 19:00	Italy	0–2	Germany	Court 2 Attendance: 112; Referees: Sylwia Bartkowiak (POL), Weronika Łakomy (POL)
23 June 2026; 19:00	(18–28, 20–22); Report			Court 2 Attendance: 112; Referees: Sylwia Bartkowiak (POL), Weronika Łakomy (POL)

24 June 2026; 11:00	Argentina	2–1	Italy	Court 3 Attendance: 70; Referees: Corina Radut (ROU), Daniela-Andreea Enache (ROU)
24 June 2026; 11:00	(14–18, 21–14, 9–8); Report			Court 3 Attendance: 70; Referees: Corina Radut (ROU), Daniela-Andreea Enache (ROU)

24 June 2026; 11:00	Germany	2–1	Brazil	Central court Referees: Víctor Rollán (ESP), Sergio Martínez (ESP)
24 June 2026; 11:00	(22–23, 20–18, 9–8); Report			Central court Referees: Víctor Rollán (ESP), Sergio Martínez (ESP)

=== Group D ===
Pos	Team	Pld	W	L	Pts	SW	SL	SR	SPW	SPL	SPR	Qualification
1	Croatia (H)	3	3	0	6	6	0	MAX	135	109	1.239	Main round
2	France	3	2	1	4	4	2	2.000	133	120	1.108	Main round
3	Oman	3	1	2	2	2	4	0.500	110	118	0.932	Main round
4	Australia	3	0	3	0	0	6	0.000	111	142	0.782	Consolation round

Source: IHF
Rules for classification: 1) Points; 2) Head-to-head points; 3) Head-to-head set difference; 4) Head-to-head points won; 5) Set difference; 6) Points won; 7) Draw.
(H) Host

23 June 2026; 13:00	France	2–0	Australia	Court 2 Attendance: 80; Referees: Bjarne Deiters (GER), Jesper Stumpfe (GER)
23 June 2026; 13:00	(24–14, 23–19); Report			Court 2 Attendance: 80; Referees: Bjarne Deiters (GER), Jesper Stumpfe (GER)

23 June 2026; 13:00	Croatia	2–0	Oman	Central court Referees: Sidiney dos Santos (BRA), Flavio de Moura (BRA)
23 June 2026; 13:00	(15–12, 20–16); Report			Central court Referees: Sidiney dos Santos (BRA), Flavio de Moura (BRA)

23 June 2026; 21:00	France	2–0	Oman	Court 4 Attendance: 35; Referees: Sylwia Bartkowiak (POL), Weronika Łakomy (POL)
23 June 2026; 21:00	(20–18, 23–18); Report			Court 4 Attendance: 35; Referees: Sylwia Bartkowiak (POL), Weronika Łakomy (POL)

23 June 2026; 21:30	Australia	0–2	Croatia	Central court Attendance: 200; Referees: Víctor Rollán (ESP), Sergio Martínez (ESP)
23 June 2026; 21:30	(20–23, 18–26); Report			Central court Attendance: 200; Referees: Víctor Rollán (ESP), Sergio Martínez (ESP)

24 June 2026; 13:00	Oman	2–0	Australia	Court 3 Attendance: 50; Referees: Bjarne Deiters (GER), Jesper Stumpfe (GER)
24 June 2026; 13:00	(22–18, 24–22); Report			Court 3 Attendance: 50; Referees: Bjarne Deiters (GER), Jesper Stumpfe (GER)

24 June 2026; 13:00	Croatia	2–0	France	Central court Referees: Víctor Rollán (ESP), Sergio Martínez (ESP)
24 June 2026; 13:00	(22–20, 29–23); Report			Central court Referees: Víctor Rollán (ESP), Sergio Martínez (ESP)

== Consolation round ==
Pos	Team	Pld	W	L	Pts	SW	SL	SR	SPW	SPL	SPR
1	United States	3	3	0	6	6	0	MAX	150	107	1.402
2	Italy	3	2	1	4	4	2	2.000	138	127	1.087
3	Australia	3	1	2	2	2	4	0.500	117	127	0.921
4	Puerto Rico	3	0	3	0	2	4	0.500	82	126	0.651

Source: IHF
Rules for classification: 1) Points; 2) Head-to-head points; 3) Head-to-head set difference; 4) Head-to-head points won; 5) Set difference; 6) Points won; 7) Draw.

25 June 2026; 10:00	United States	2–0	Puerto Rico	Court 4 Referees: Bulakorn Kongka (THA), Thiwakorn Sangjun (THA)
25 June 2026; 10:00	(23–12, 24–14); Report			Court 4 Referees: Bulakorn Kongka (THA), Thiwakorn Sangjun (THA)

25 June 2026; 12:00	Italy	2–0	Australia	Court 4 Attendance: 52; Referees: Dario Rupčić (CRO), Ivica Botincan (CRO)
25 June 2026; 12:00	(22–20, 27–26); Report			Court 4 Attendance: 52; Referees: Dario Rupčić (CRO), Ivica Botincan (CRO)

25 June 2026; 18:00	United States	2–0	Italy	Central court Attendance: 150; Referees: Dario Rupčić (CRO), Ivica Botincan (CRO)
25 June 2026; 18:00	(26–22, 23–22); Report			Central court Attendance: 150; Referees: Dario Rupčić (CRO), Ivica Botincan (CRO)

25 June 2026; 18:00	Puerto Rico	0–2	Australia	Court 2 Attendance: 50; Referees: Sidiney dos Santos (BRA), Flavio de Moura (BRA)
25 June 2026; 18:00	(10–18, 14–16); Report			Court 2 Attendance: 50; Referees: Sidiney dos Santos (BRA), Flavio de Moura (BRA)

26 June 2026; 10:00	Australia	0–2	United States	Court 4 Attendance: 40; Referees: Sylwia Bartkowiak (POL), Weronika Łakomy (POL)
26 June 2026; 10:00	(19–28, 18–26); Report			Court 4 Attendance: 40; Referees: Sylwia Bartkowiak (POL), Weronika Łakomy (POL)

26 June 2026; 12:00	Puerto Rico	0–2	Italy	Court 4 Attendance: 30; Referees: Sidiney dos Santos (BRA), Flavio de Moura (BRA)
26 June 2026; 12:00	(16–22, 16–23); Report			Court 4 Attendance: 30; Referees: Sidiney dos Santos (BRA), Flavio de Moura (BRA)

== Main round ==
Points obtained against teams from the same group were carried over.

=== Group I ===
Pos	Team	Pld	W	L	Pts	SW	SL	SR	SPW	SPL	SPR	Qualification
1	Hungary	5	4	1	8 (Note: Hungary 2 Pts, +1 SD; Portugal 2 Pts, 0 SD; Spain 2 Pts, −1 SD.)	9	3	3.000	251	235	1.068	Quarterfinals
2	Portugal	5	4	1	8	9	5	1.800	268	246	1.089	Quarterfinals
3	Spain	5	4	1	8	8	4	2.000	227	203	1.118	Quarterfinals
4	Denmark	5	2	3	4	7	6	1.167	262	244	1.074	Quarterfinals
5	Iran	5	1	4	2	3	8	0.375	208	236	0.881	
6	Tunisia	5	0	5	0	0	10	0.000	190	242	0.785	

Source: IHF
Rules for classification: 1) Points; 2) Head-to-head points; 3) Head-to-head set difference; 4) Head-to-head points won; 5) Set difference; 6) Points won; 7) Draw.
Notes:

25 June 2026; 10:00	Spain	2–0	Tunisia	Court 3 Attendance: 50; Referees: Dario Rupčić (CRO), Ivica Botincan (CRO)
25 June 2026; 10:00	(23–22, 23–10); Report			Court 3 Attendance: 50; Referees: Dario Rupčić (CRO), Ivica Botincan (CRO)

25 June 2026; 10:00	Iran	0–2	Denmark	Central court Attendance: 150; Referees: José María Galeano (PAR), José María Rodríguez (PAR)
25 June 2026; 10:00	(16–23, 16–21); Report			Central court Attendance: 150; Referees: José María Galeano (PAR), José María Rodríguez (PAR)

25 June 2026; 10:00	Hungary	1–2	Portugal	Court 2 Attendance: 50; Referees: Bjarne Deiters (GER), Jesper Stumpfe (GER)
25 June 2026; 10:00	(24–25, 23–18, 4–9); Report			Court 2 Attendance: 50; Referees: Bjarne Deiters (GER), Jesper Stumpfe (GER)

25 June 2026; 19:00	Iran	0–2	Hungary	Court 3 Attendance: 50; Referees: Sylwia Bartkowiak (POL), Weronika Łakomy (POL)
25 June 2026; 19:00	(20–22, 22–23); Report			Court 3 Attendance: 50; Referees: Sylwia Bartkowiak (POL), Weronika Łakomy (POL)

25 June 2026; 19:00	Denmark	1–2	Spain	Central court Referees: Bjarne Deiters (GER), Jesper Stumpfe (GER)
25 June 2026; 19:00	(20–26, 28–26, 6–9); Report			Central court Referees: Bjarne Deiters (GER), Jesper Stumpfe (GER)

25 June 2026; 19:00	Portugal	2–0	Tunisia	Court 4 Attendance: 10; Referees: Bulakorn Kongka (THA), Thiwakorn Sangjun (THA)
25 June 2026; 19:00	(25–16, 26–24); Report			Court 4 Attendance: 10; Referees: Bulakorn Kongka (THA), Thiwakorn Sangjun (THA)

26 June 2026; 10:00	Denmark	1–2	Portugal	Central court Attendance: 150; Referees: Dario Rupčić (CRO), Ivica Botincan (CRO)
26 June 2026; 10:00	(22–29, 24–18, 6–8); Report			Central court Attendance: 150; Referees: Dario Rupčić (CRO), Ivica Botincan (CRO)

26 June 2026; 10:00	Hungary	2–0	Spain	Court 2 Attendance: 50; Referees: Sidiney dos Santos (BRA), Flavio de Moura (BRA)
26 June 2026; 10:00	(25–20, 22–20); Report			Court 2 Attendance: 50; Referees: Sidiney dos Santos (BRA), Flavio de Moura (BRA)

26 June 2026; 10:00	Tunisia	0–2	Iran	Court 3 Attendance: 50; Referees: Bjarne Deiters (GER), Jesper Stumpfe (GER)
26 June 2026; 10:00	(22–23, 16–19); Report			Court 3 Attendance: 50; Referees: Bjarne Deiters (GER), Jesper Stumpfe (GER)

=== Group II ===
Pos	Team	Pld	W	L	Pts	SW	SL	SR	SPW	SPL	SPR	Qualification
1	Germany	5	5	0	10	10	5	2.000	244	214	1.140	Quarterfinals
2	Brazil	5	4	1	8	9	2	4.500	241	181	1.331	Quarterfinals
3	Argentina	5	3	2	6	7	5	1.400	225	226	0.996	Quarterfinals
4	Croatia (H)	5	2	3	4	6	6	1.000	218	205	1.063	Quarterfinals
5	France	5	1	4	2	3	8	0.375	200	233	0.858	
6	Oman	5	0	5	0	1	10	0.100	160	229	0.699	

Source: IHF
Rules for classification: 1) Points; 2) Head-to-head points; 3) Head-to-head set difference; 4) Head-to-head points won; 5) Set difference; 6) Points won; 7) Draw.
(H) Host

25 June 2026; 12:00	Germany	2–1	Oman	Court 2 Attendance: 50; Referees: José María Galeano (PAR), José María Rodríguez (PAR)
25 June 2026; 12:00	(13–15, 26–10, 15–14); Report			Court 2 Attendance: 50; Referees: José María Galeano (PAR), José María Rodríguez (PAR)

25 June 2026; 12:00	Argentina	2–0	France	Court 3 Attendance: 100; Referees: Bulakorn Kongka (THA), Thiwakorn Sangjun (THA)
25 June 2026; 12:00	(30–16, 22–20); Report			Court 3 Attendance: 100; Referees: Bulakorn Kongka (THA), Thiwakorn Sangjun (THA)

25 June 2026; 12:00	Croatia	0–2	Brazil	Central court Attendance: 350; Referees: Sylwia Bartkowiak (POL), Weronika Łakomy (POL)
25 June 2026; 12:00	(20–22, 18–20); Report			Central court Attendance: 350; Referees: Sylwia Bartkowiak (POL), Weronika Łakomy (POL)

25 June 2026; 20:00	France	1–2	Germany	Court 2 Attendance: 120; Referees: Khalid Al-Hail (QAT), Ali Al-Yafei (QAT)
25 June 2026; 20:00	(21–20, 11–12, 6–10); Report			Court 2 Attendance: 120; Referees: Khalid Al-Hail (QAT), Ali Al-Yafei (QAT)

25 June 2026; 20:00	Brazil	2–0	Oman	Court 3 Attendance: 50; Referees: Víctor Rollán (ESP), Sergio Martínez (ESP)
25 June 2026; 20:00	(26–10, 24–10); Report			Court 3 Attendance: 50; Referees: Víctor Rollán (ESP), Sergio Martínez (ESP)

25 June 2026; 21:00	Argentina	2–1	Croatia	Central court Attendance: 450; Referees: José María Galeano (PAR), José María Rodríguez (PAR)
25 June 2026; 21:00	(19–18, 24–31, 6–4); Report			Central court Attendance: 450; Referees: José María Galeano (PAR), José María Rodríguez (PAR)

26 June 2026; 12:00	France	0–2	Brazil	Court 2 Attendance: 50; Referees: Bulakorn Kongka (THA), Thiwakorn Sangjun (THA)
26 June 2026; 12:00	(16–26, 24–26); Report			Court 2 Attendance: 50; Referees: Bulakorn Kongka (THA), Thiwakorn Sangjun (THA)

26 June 2026; 12:00	Croatia	1–2	Germany	Central court Attendance: 300; Referees: Víctor Rollán (ESP), Sergio Martínez (ESP)
26 June 2026; 12:00	(24–12, 9–22, 8–9); Report			Central court Attendance: 300; Referees: Víctor Rollán (ESP), Sergio Martínez (ESP)

26 June 2026; 12:00	Oman	0–2	Argentina	Court 3 Attendance: 50; Referees: Sylwia Bartkowiak (POL), Weronika Łakomy (POL)
26 June 2026; 12:00	(15–22, 22–23); Report			Court 3 Attendance: 50; Referees: Sylwia Bartkowiak (POL), Weronika Łakomy (POL)

== Knockout stage ==
=== Bracket ===
Championship bracket

Quarter-finals
27 June
Hungary	0
Croatia	2
27 June
Brazil	2
Spain	0
27 June
Portugal	1
Argentina	2
27 June
Germany	2
Denmark	0

Semi-finals
27 June
Croatia	1
Brazil	2
27 June
Argentina	1
Germany	2

Final
28 June
Brazil	0
Germany	2
Third place
28 June
Croatia	1
Argentina	2

Fifth place bracket

5–8th place semifinals
27 June
Hungary	1
Spain	2
27 June
Portugal	2
Denmark	0

Fifth place game
28 June
Spain	2
Portugal	1
Seventh place game
28 June
Hungary	0
Denmark	2

9–16th place bracket

9–16th place quarterfinals
27 June
Iran	2
Puerto Rico	1
27 June
Tunisia	2
United States	1
27 June
France	2
Australia	0
27 June
Oman	1
Italy	2

9–12th place semifinals
27 June
Iran	2
Tunisia	1
27 June
France	2
Italy	1

Ninth place game
28 June
Iran	2
France	1
Eleventh place game
28 June
Tunisia	1
Italy	2

13–16th place bracket

13–16th place semifinals
27 June
Puerto Rico	0
United States	2
27 June
Australia	0
Oman	2

13th place game
28 June
United States	2
Oman	0
15th place game
28 June
Puerto Rico	0
Australia	2

=== 9–16th place quarterfinals ===
27 June 2026; 11:00	Oman	1–2	Italy	Court 4 Attendance: 30; Referees: Víctor Rollán (ESP), Sergio Martínez (ESP)
27 June 2026; 11:00	(19–18, 16–22, 6–9); Report			Court 4 Attendance: 30; Referees: Víctor Rollán (ESP), Sergio Martínez (ESP)

27 June 2026; 11:00	France	2–0	Australia	Court 3 Attendance: 125; Referees: Sylwia Bartkowiak (POL), Weronika Łakomy (POL)
27 June 2026; 11:00	(32–20, 28–16); Report			Court 3 Attendance: 125; Referees: Sylwia Bartkowiak (POL), Weronika Łakomy (POL)

27 June 2026; 13:00	Tunisia	2–1	United States	Court 4 Attendance: 36; Referees: Bulakorn Kongka (THA), Thiwakorn Sangjun (THA)
27 June 2026; 13:00	(24–20, 14–20, 14–12); Report			Court 4 Attendance: 36; Referees: Bulakorn Kongka (THA), Thiwakorn Sangjun (THA)

27 June 2026; 13:00	Iran	2–1	Puerto Rico	Court 3 Attendance: 100; Referees: Dario Rupčić (CRO), Ivica Botincan (CRO)
27 June 2026; 13:00	(22–14, 16–19, 9–6); Report			Court 3 Attendance: 100; Referees: Dario Rupčić (CRO), Ivica Botincan (CRO)

=== Quarterfinals ===
27 June 2026; 11:00	Germany	2–0	Denmark	Central court Attendance: 200; Referees: Dario Rupčić (CRO), Ivica Botincan (CRO)
27 June 2026; 11:00	(22–20, 25–10); Report			Central court Attendance: 200; Referees: Dario Rupčić (CRO), Ivica Botincan (CRO)

27 June 2026; 11:00	Argentina	2–1	Portugal	Court 2 Attendance: 80; Referees: Corina Radut (ROU), Daniela-Andreea Enache (ROU)
27 June 2026; 11:00	(24–25, 19–18, 7–2); Report			Court 2 Attendance: 80; Referees: Corina Radut (ROU), Daniela-Andreea Enache (ROU)

27 June 2026; 13:00	Spain	0–2	Brazil	Court 2 Attendance: 80; Referees: Sylwia Bartkowiak (POL), Weronika Łakomy (POL)
27 June 2026; 13:00	(20–23, 16–22); Report			Court 2 Attendance: 80; Referees: Sylwia Bartkowiak (POL), Weronika Łakomy (POL)

27 June 2026; 13:00	Hungary	0–2	Croatia	Central court Attendance: 350; Referees: Víctor Rollán (ESP), Sergio Martínez (ESP)
27 June 2026; 13:00	(24–25, 20–21); Report			Central court Attendance: 350; Referees: Víctor Rollán (ESP), Sergio Martínez (ESP)

=== 13–16th place semifinals ===
27 June 2026; 19:00	Australia	0–2	Oman	Court 4 Attendance: 65; Referees: Dario Rupčić (CRO), Ivica Botincan (CRO)
27 June 2026; 19:00	(15–16, 18–20); Report			Court 4 Attendance: 65; Referees: Dario Rupčić (CRO), Ivica Botincan (CRO)

27 June 2026; 21:00	Puerto Rico	0–2	United States	Court 4 Attendance: 51; Referees: Bulakorn Kongka (THA), Thiwakorn Sangjun (THA)
27 June 2026; 21:00	(14–32, 12–20); Report			Court 4 Attendance: 51; Referees: Bulakorn Kongka (THA), Thiwakorn Sangjun (THA)

=== 9–12th place semifinals ===
27 June 2026; 19:00	France	2–1	Italy	Court 3 Attendance: 50; Referees: Bulakorn Kongka (THA), Thiwakorn Sangjun (THA)
27 June 2026; 19:00	(19–16, 14–28, 16–14); Report			Court 3 Attendance: 50; Referees: Bulakorn Kongka (THA), Thiwakorn Sangjun (THA)

27 June 2026; 21:00	Iran	2–1	Tunisia	Court 3 Referees: Sidiney dos Santos (BRA), Flavio de Moura (BRA)
27 June 2026; 21:00	(19–8, 14–16, 5–0); Report			Court 3 Referees: Sidiney dos Santos (BRA), Flavio de Moura (BRA)

=== 5–8th place semifinals ===
27 June 2026; 19:00	Denmark	0–2	Portugal	Court 2 Attendance: 50; Referees: Sylwia Bartkowiak (POL), Weronika Łakomy (POL)
27 June 2026; 19:00	(21–28, 20–23); Report			Court 2 Attendance: 50; Referees: Sylwia Bartkowiak (POL), Weronika Łakomy (POL)

27 June 2026; 21:00	Hungary	1–2	Spain	Court 2 Referees: Dario Rupčić (CRO), Ivica Botincan (CRO)
27 June 2026; 21:00	(18–21, 32–30, 6–9); Report			Court 2 Referees: Dario Rupčić (CRO), Ivica Botincan (CRO)

=== Semifinals ===
27 June 2026; 19:00	Germany	2–1	Argentina	Central court Attendance: 250; Referees: Sidiney dos Santos (BRA), Flavio de Moura (BRA)
27 June 2026; 19:00	(21–20, 12–15, 9–8); Report			Central court Attendance: 250; Referees: Sidiney dos Santos (BRA), Flavio de Moura (BRA)

27 June 2026; 21:00	Croatia	1–2	Brazil	Central court Attendance: 450; Referees: Bjarne Deiters (GER), Jesper Stumpfe (GER)
27 June 2026; 21:00	(22–25, 21–20, 6–8); Report			Central court Attendance: 450; Referees: Bjarne Deiters (GER), Jesper Stumpfe (GER)

=== 15th place game ===
28 June 2026; 10:00	Puerto Rico	0–2	Australia	Court 4 Referees: Corina Radut (ROU), Daniela-Andreea Enache (ROU)
28 June 2026; 10:00	(16–24, 14–17); Report			Court 4 Referees: Corina Radut (ROU), Daniela-Andreea Enache (ROU)

=== 13th place game ===
28 June 2026; 10:00	United States	2–0	Oman	Court 3 Attendance: 50; Referees: Sylwia Bartkowiak (POL), Weronika Łakomy (POL)
28 June 2026; 10:00	(17–16, 21–18); Report			Court 3 Attendance: 50; Referees: Sylwia Bartkowiak (POL), Weronika Łakomy (POL)

=== Eleventh place game ===
28 June 2026; 10:00	Tunisia	1–2	Italy	Court 2 Attendance: 50; Referees: Dario Rupčić (CRO), Ivica Botincan (CRO)
28 June 2026; 10:00	(20–21, 16–14, 2–7); Report			Court 2 Attendance: 50; Referees: Dario Rupčić (CRO), Ivica Botincan (CRO)

=== Ninth place game ===
28 June 2026; 11:00	Iran	2–1	France	Court 2 Attendance: 50; Referees: Bjarne Deiters (GER), Jesper Stumpfe (GER)
28 June 2026; 11:00	(24–0, 15–23, 7–6); Report			Court 2 Attendance: 50; Referees: Bjarne Deiters (GER), Jesper Stumpfe (GER)

=== Seventh place game ===
28 June 2026; 10:00	Hungary	0–2	Denmark	Central court Attendance: 150; Referees: José María Galeano (PAR), José María Rodríguez (PAR)
28 June 2026; 10:00	(20–25, 20–24); Report			Central court Attendance: 150; Referees: José María Galeano (PAR), José María Rodríguez (PAR)

=== Fifth place game ===
28 June 2026; 12:00	Spain	2–1	Portugal	Court 3 Attendance: 50; Referees: Khalid Al-Hail (QAT), Ali Al-Yafei (QAT)
28 June 2026; 12:00	(16–21, 23–20, 9–8); Report			Court 3 Attendance: 50; Referees: Khalid Al-Hail (QAT), Ali Al-Yafei (QAT)

=== Third place game ===
28 June 2026; 18:00	Croatia	1–2	Argentina	Central court Attendance: 550; Referees: Víctor Rollán (ESP), Sergio Martínez (ESP)
28 June 2026; 18:00	(17–16, 16–18, 8–9); Report			Central court Attendance: 550; Referees: Víctor Rollán (ESP), Sergio Martínez (ESP)

=== Final ===
28 June 2026; 20:00	Brazil	0–2	Germany	Central court Attendance: 750; Referees: Corina Radut (ROU), Daniela-Andreea Enache (ROU)
28 June 2026; 20:00	(18–21, 14–21); Report			Central court Attendance: 750; Referees: Corina Radut (ROU), Daniela-Andreea Enache (ROU)

== Final ranking ==
Rank	Team
1st place, gold medalist(s)	Germany
2nd place, silver medalist(s)	Brazil
3rd place, bronze medalist(s)	Argentina
4	Croatia
5	Spain
6	Portugal
7	Denmark
8	Hungary
9	Iran
10	France
11	Italy
12	Tunisia
13	United States
14	Oman
15	Australia
16	Puerto Rico

== Statistics and awards ==
=== Top goalscorers ===
Rank	Name	Points
1	(Denmark) Martin Andersen	153
2	(Hungary) Norbert Gyene	148
3	(Argentina) Jorge Pérez	141
4	(Denmark) Dines Kjeldgaard	130
5	(Portugal) Tiago Costa	128
6	(Spain) Mario Miranda	122
7	(Iran) Ali Heidarian	121
8	(United States) Jacobo Garcia	119
8	(Brazil) Renan Pinheiro	119
10	(United States) Jason Borchik	117

Source: IHF

=== Top goalkeepers ===
Rank	Name	%	Saves	Shots
1	(Germany) Oliver Middell	35	30	86
2	(Germany) Moritz Ebert	28	43	152
3	(Croatia) Luka Baković	27	70	258
4	(Spain) Pol Amores	26	18	69
5	(France) Lucas Pégurier-Boiron	25	68	267
5	(Brazil) Cristiano Seben	25	49	194
5	(United States) Bryan Cook	25	64	256
8	(Spain) Carlos Donderis	24	45	185
8	(Portugal) Ricardo Castro	24	56	230
8	(Iran) Matin Goldan	24	55	231
8	(Italy) Pasqualino Di Giandomenico	24	27	113

Source: IHF

=== Awards ===
The awards were announced on 28 June 2026.

Position	Player
MVP	(Brazil) Bruno Carlos de Oliveira
Goalkeeper	(Germany) Moritz Ebert
Right wing	(Brazil) Nailson Amaral
Left wing	(Argentina) Nahuel Baptista
Playmaker	(Argentina) Lucas Coronel
Pivot	(Croatia) Ivan Jurić
Defender	(Germany) Severin Henrich
