= 2026 Beach Handball World Championships =

2026 Beach Handball World Championships may refer to:

- 2026 Women's Beach Handball World Championships
- 2026 Men's Beach Handball World Championships
