= Sweden men's national beach handball team =

Sweden

Information
- Association: Swedish Handball Federation
- Coach: Helene Bernharddtz

Colours
Home	Away

Results

World Championship
- Appearances: 1 (First in 2018)
- Best result: 4th (2018)
- Last updated on Unknown.

The Sweden national beach handball team is the national beach handball team of Sweden and is controlled by the Swedish Handball Federation. Their best result in the European Championship is 2017, when Sweden finished in 5th place. The team played for the first time in the 2018 World Championships.

== Results ==
=== World Championships ===
- 2018 – 4th place

=== European Championship ===
Year	Position	Pld	W	L
(Italy) 2000	Did not enter			
(Spain) 2002	6th	8	3	5
(Turkey) 2004	Did not enter			
(Germany) 2006	14th	9	0	9
(Italy) 2007	16th	9	2	7
(Norway) 2009	10th	9	3	6
(Croatia) 2011	Did not enter			
(Denmark) 2013	11th	9	4	5
(Spain) 2015	10th	8	2	6
(Croatia) 2017	5th	11	5	6
(Poland) 2019	10th	9	6	3
(Bulgaria) 2021	11th	10	2	8
(Portugal) 2023	10th	8	4	4
(Turkey) 2025	10th	9	4	5
