= Bulgaria women's national beach handball team =

Bulgaria

Information
- Association: Bulgarian Handball Federation

Colours
| Home | Away |

Results

World Championship
- Appearances: 1 (First in 2006)
- Best result: 4th (2006)
- Last updated on Unknown.

The Bulgaria national women's beach handball team is the national team of Bulgaria. It takes part in international beach handball competitions. The team's greatest result came in 2006 when they won the Balkan Championship along with Semi-Final stage at the 2006 Beach Handball World Championships.

== Competition Results ==
Champions Runners-Up Semi-Finals

=== Balkan Championship ===
| Year | Rank |
|---|---|
| (Bulgaria) 2006 | Champions |

=== World Beach Handball Championships ===
| Year | Rank |
|---|---|
| (Brazil) 2006 | Semi-Finals (bronze) |
