= United States men's national beach handball team =

United States

Information
- Association: USA Team Handball
- Coach: Michael Hinson
- Assistant coach: William Bigham

Colours
Home	Away

Results

World Championship
- Appearances: 5 (First in 2016)
- Best result: 11th (2016)
- Last updated on Unknown.

United States men's national beach handball team
Medal record

Men's Beach Handball

Representing the United States

Continental Championship
Bronze medal – third place	1999 Brazil	
Gold medal – first place	2016 Venezuela	
Bronze medal – third place	2018 United States	
Gold medal – first place	2019 Trinidad and Tobago	
Gold medal – first place	2022 Mexico	
Gold medal – first place	2024 Puerto Rico	
Gold medal – first place	2026 St. Kitts & Nevis	

The United States national beach handball team (USA Beach Handball) is the national team of the United States. It is governed by USA Team Handball and takes part in international beach handball competitions.

== Restart of the program in 2015 ==
By winning the Pan American Championships, the USA men team qualified into the 12 team field of the World Championships in Budapest, Hungary. Being their first World Championships the international expectations were not high for any success. In the first game of the tournament, the USA Team shocked the international handball world by defeating the #5 team in the world, Ukraine in straight sets. Needing one more win in the next 4 games to qualify into the top 6, USA fell just short against defending World Champion Brazil, lost a close game against defending bronze medalist Qatar, then lost 2 extremely tight shootouts against Egypt and Bahrain. Finishing out of the medal rounds, USA then lost a close shootout to Oman and finished the tournament with an emotional win against Australia in the rain.

== Results ==
=== World Championships ===
Year	Position
(Egypt) 2004	Did not qualify
(Brazil) 2006	Did not qualify
(Spain) 2008	Did not qualify
(Turkey) 2010	Did not qualify
(Oman) 2012	Did not qualify
(Brazil) 2014	Did not qualify
(Hungary) 2016	11th
(Russia) 2018	12th
(Greece) 2022	12th
(China) 2024	13th
(Croatia) 2026	13th
Total	5/11

=== Pan American Championships ===
Year	Position
(Brazil) 1998	4th
(Brazil) 1999	3rd
(Argentina) 2004	Did not qualify
(Argentina) 2008	Did not qualify
(Argentina) 2012	Did not qualify
(Paraguay) 2014	Did not qualify
(Venezuela) 2016	1st
(United States) 2018	3rd
(Trinidad and Tobago) 2019	1st
(Mexico) 2022	1st
(Puerto Rico) 2024	1st
Total	5/9
