= 2020 Men's Beach Handball World Championships =

9th edition of men's beach handball world championship tournament

2020 IHF Men's Beach Handball World Championship
Tournament details
- Venue(s): 1 (in 1 host city)
- Teams: 16 (from 5 confederations)

The 2020 Men's IHF Beach Handball World Championships would have been the ninth edition of the tournament. Originally scheduled for 30 June to 5 July 2020 in Pescara, Italy, the tournament was planned to be rescheduled and moved to another host country, due to the COVID-19 pandemic.

On 22 February 2021, the tournament was cancelled.

== Qualification ==
Qualification	Vacancies	Qualified
Host	1	Italy
Defending champion	1	Brazil
2019 African Beach Games	1	Tunisia
2019 Asian Beach Handball Championship	2	Oman; Qatar
2019 European Beach Handball Championship	5	Croatia; Denmark; Hungary; Norway; Russia
2019 Oceania Beach Handball Championship	1	Australia
2019 South and Central American Beach Handball Championship	2	Argentina; Uruguay
2019 Nor.ca Beach Handball Championship	2	Mexico; United States
Wildcard	1	Germany
