= Spain men's national beach handball team =

Spain

Information
- Association: Royal Spanish Handball Federation
- Coach: Juan Vázquez
- Assistant coach: Miguel Rueda

Colours
Home	Away

Results

World Games
- Appearances: 7 (First in 2001)
- Best result: 2nd (2001, 2005)

World Championship
- Appearances: 10 (First in 2006)
- Best result: 3rd (2006)
- Last updated on Unknown.

Spain men's national beach handball team
Medal record

World Championship
Bronze medal – third place	2006 Brazil	

The Spanish national beach handball team is the national team of Spain. It is governed by the Royal Spanish Handball Federation and takes part in international beach handball competitions.

== Results ==
=== World Championships ===
Year	Position
(Egypt) 2004	—
(Brazil) 2006	3rd
(Spain) 2008	5th
(Turkey) 2010	8th
(Oman) 2012	5th
(Brazil) 2014	5th
(Hungary) 2016	5th
(Russia) 2018	5th
(Greece) 2022	7th
(China) 2024	5th
(Croatia) 2026	5th
Total	10/11

=== World Games ===
Year	Position
(Japan) 2001	2nd
(Germany) 2005	2nd
(Taiwan) 2009	—
Total	2/3
