= 2024 Men's Beach Handball World Championships =

Tournament details
- Host country: China
- Venue(s): Pingtan Island, Fuzhou
- Dates: 18–23 June
- Teams: 16 (from 5 confederations)

Final positions
- Champions: Croatia (4th title)
- Runners-up: Denmark
- Third place: Portugal
- Fourth place: Germany

Tournament statistics
- Top scorer(s): (Uruguay) Santiago Rodríguez (155 points)

Awards
- Best player: (Croatia) Ivan Dumenčić
- Best goalkeeper: (Portugal) Ricardo Castro

The 2024 Men's Beach Handball World Championships were tenth edition of the championship, held from 18 to 23 June 2024 in China, under the aegis of International Handball Federation (IHF). The championship was held at the Pingtan International Beach Sports Base at Long Wangtou Ocean Park in Fuzhou.

Croatia won their fourth overall and second consecutive title after a win over Denmark.

== Qualification ==
Qualification	Vacancies	Qualified
Host	1	China
Defending champion	1	Croatia
Africa	1	Tunisia
2023 Asian Beach Handball Championship	2	Oman; Qatar
2023 European Beach Handball Championship	5	Denmark; Germany; Hungary; Portugal; Spain
2023 Oceania Beach Handball Championship	1	Australia
2024 South and Central American Beach Handball Championship	3	Argentina; Brazil; Uruguay
2024 NACHC Beach Handball Championship	2	United States; Puerto Rico

== Format ==
The 16 teams will be drawn into four groups of four teams each where they will play a round-robin. The top three teams will advance to the main round, consisting of two groups of six teams, facing the teams they have not met in the preliminary round. The first four teams advance to the quarterfinals, from where on a knockout stage will be played. The last-placed teams from the first round will play a consolation round.

== Draw ==
The draw took place on 3 May 2024.

=== Seeding ===
Pot 1	Pot 2	Pot 3	Pot 4
Croatia; Hungary; Germany; Brazil	Denmark; China; Qatar; Argentina	Portugal; Spain; Oman; Uruguay	United States; Australia; Tunisia; Puerto Rico

== Preliminary round ==
All times are local (UTC+8).

=== Group A ===
Pos	Team	Pld	W	L	Pts	SW	SL	SR	SPW	SPL	SPR	Qualification
1	Hungary	3	3	0	6	6	1	6.000	123	88	1.398	Main round
2	Denmark	3	2	1	4	5	2	2.500	121	93	1.301	Main round
3	Oman	3	1	2	2	2	4	0.500	78	78	1.000	Main round
4	Australia	3	0	3	0	0	6	0.000	69	132	0.523	Consolation round

Source: IHF
Rules for classification: 1) Points; 2) Head-to-head points; 3) Head-to-head set difference; 4) Head-to-head points won; 5) Set difference; 6) Points won; 7) Draw.

18 June 2024; 15:50	Denmark	2–0	Australia	Court 3 Attendance: 30; Referees: Mery Diaz (ARG), Soledad Vignoni (ARG)
18 June 2024; 15:50	(22–12, 33–16); Report			Court 3 Attendance: 30; Referees: Mery Diaz (ARG), Soledad Vignoni (ARG)

18 June 2024; 15:50	Hungary	2–0	Oman	Court 4 Attendance: 80; Referees: José Galiano (PAR), José Rodrigues (PAR)
18 June 2024; 15:50	(17–12, 16–14); Report			Court 4 Attendance: 80; Referees: José Galiano (PAR), José Rodrigues (PAR)

19 June 2024; 11:10	Oman	0–2	Denmark	Court 4 Attendance: 10; Referees: Coriana Constantin (ROU), Daniela-Andreea Enache (ROU)
19 June 2024; 11:10	(6–8, 11–14); Report			Court 4 Attendance: 10; Referees: Coriana Constantin (ROU), Daniela-Andreea Enache (ROU)

19 June 2024; 11:10	Australia	0–2	Hungary	Court 3 Attendance: 10; Referees: Cao Hongjun (CHN), Xu Jian (CHN)
19 June 2024; 11:10	(8–18, 10–24); Report			Court 3 Attendance: 10; Referees: Cao Hongjun (CHN), Xu Jian (CHN)

19 June 2024; 18:20	Oman	2–0	Australia	Court 2 Attendance: 20; Referees: Mery Diaz (ARG), Soledad Vignoni (ARG)
19 June 2024; 18:20	(20–14, 15–9); Report			Court 2 Attendance: 20; Referees: Mery Diaz (ARG), Soledad Vignoni (ARG)

19 June 2024; 18:20	Hungary	2–1	Denmark	Central court Attendance: 150; Referees: Mathieu Fanack (FRA), Cédric Daré (FRA)
19 June 2024; 18:20	(17–18, 22–20, 9–6); Report			Central court Attendance: 150; Referees: Mathieu Fanack (FRA), Cédric Daré (FRA)

=== Group B ===
Pos	Team	Pld	W	L	Pts	SW	SL	SR	SPW	SPL	SPR	Qualification
1	Brazil	3	3	0	6	6	1	6.000	134	80	1.675	Main round
2	Spain	3	2	1	4	5	2	2.500	127	100	1.270	Main round
3	Tunisia	3	1	2	2	2	5	0.400	107	128	0.836	Main round
4	China (H)	3	0	3	0	1	6	0.167	85	145	0.586	Consolation round

Source: IHF
Rules for classification: 1) Points; 2) Head-to-head points; 3) Head-to-head set difference; 4) Head-to-head points won; 5) Set difference; 6) Points won; 7) Draw.
(H) Host

18 June 2024; 16:40	Brazil	2–1	Spain	Central court Attendance: 320; Referees: Bjarne Deiters (GER), Jesper Stumpfe (GER)
18 June 2024; 16:40	(16–18, 19–18, 6–4); Report			Central court Attendance: 320; Referees: Bjarne Deiters (GER), Jesper Stumpfe (GER)

18 June 2024; 17:30	China	1–2	Tunisia	Central court Attendance: 1,000; Referees: Soleyman Payda (IRI), Mohammad Kiani (IRI)
18 June 2024; 17:30	(18–16, 22–24, 6–7); Report			Central court Attendance: 1,000; Referees: Soleyman Payda (IRI), Mohammad Kiani (IRI)

19 June 2024; 12:00	Tunisia	0–2	Brazil	Court 2 Attendance: 30; Referees: Mery Diaz (ARG), Soledad Vignoni (ARG)
19 June 2024; 12:00	(10–18, 10–20); Report			Court 2 Attendance: 30; Referees: Mery Diaz (ARG), Soledad Vignoni (ARG)

19 June 2024; 12:00	Spain	2–0	China	Central court Attendance: 80; Referees: Soleyman Payda (IRI), Mohammad Kiani (IRI)
19 June 2024; 12:00	(22–7, 21–12); Report			Central court Attendance: 80; Referees: Soleyman Payda (IRI), Mohammad Kiani (IRI)

19 June 2024; 20:00	Spain	2–0	Tunisia	Court 2 Attendance: 10; Referees: José Galeano (PAR), José Rodrigues (PAR)
19 June 2024; 20:00	(22–20, 22–20); Report			Court 2 Attendance: 10; Referees: José Galeano (PAR), José Rodrigues (PAR)

19 June 2024; 20:00	Brazil	2–0	China	Central court Attendance: 500; Referees: Bjarne Deiters (GER), Jesper Stumpfe (GER)
19 June 2024; 20:00	(25–10, 30–10); Report			Central court Attendance: 500; Referees: Bjarne Deiters (GER), Jesper Stumpfe (GER)

=== Group C ===
Pos	Team	Pld	W	L	Pts	SW	SL	SR	SPW	SPL	SPR	Qualification
1	Croatia	3	3	0	6	6	0	MAX	111	80	1.388	Main round
2	Portugal	3	2	1	4	4	2	2.000	129	87	1.483	Main round
3	Argentina	3	1	2	2	2	4	0.500	89	104	0.856	Main round
4	Puerto Rico	3	0	3	0	0	6	0.000	62	120	0.517	Consolation round

Source: IHF
Rules for classification: 1) Points; 2) Head-to-head points; 3) Head-to-head set difference; 4) Head-to-head points won; 5) Set difference; 6) Points won; 7) Draw.

18 June 2024; 15:00	Croatia	2–0	Portugal	Court 2 Referees: Sergio Martínez (ESP), Victor Rolland (ESP)
18 June 2024; 15:00	(16–12, 22–20); Report			Court 2 Referees: Sergio Martínez (ESP), Victor Rolland (ESP)

18 June 2024; 15:00	Argentina	2–0	Puerto Rico	Central court Attendance: 100; Referees: Mathieu Fanack (FRA), Cédric Daré (FRA)
18 June 2024; 15:00	(16–10, 16–12); Report			Central court Attendance: 100; Referees: Mathieu Fanack (FRA), Cédric Daré (FRA)

19 June 2024; 09:30	Puerto Rico	0–2	Croatia	Court 3 Attendance: 10; Referees: Jonas Primdahl (DEN), Nichlas Nygaard (DEN)
19 June 2024; 09:30	(8–14, 12–20); Report			Court 3 Attendance: 10; Referees: Jonas Primdahl (DEN), Nichlas Nygaard (DEN)

19 June 2024; 09:30	Portugal	2–0	Argentina	Court 4 Attendance: 100; Referees: Bjarne Deiters (GER), Jesper Stumpfe (GER)
19 June 2024; 09:30	(20–15, 23–14); Report			Court 4 Attendance: 100; Referees: Bjarne Deiters (GER), Jesper Stumpfe (GER)

19 June 2024; 15:50	Croatia	2–0	Argentina	Central court Attendance: 60; Referees: Coriana Constantin (ROU), Daniela-Andreea Enache (ROU)
19 June 2024; 15:50	(20–16, 19–12); Report			Central court Attendance: 60; Referees: Coriana Constantin (ROU), Daniela-Andreea Enache (ROU)

19 June 2024; 15:50	Portugal	2–0	Puerto Rico	Court 2 Attendance: 10; Referees: Soleyman Payda (IRI), Mohammad Kiani (IRI)
19 June 2024; 15:50	(26–12, 28–8); Report			Court 2 Attendance: 10; Referees: Soleyman Payda (IRI), Mohammad Kiani (IRI)

=== Group D ===
Pos	Team	Pld	W	L	Pts	SW	SL	SR	SPW	SPL	SPR	Qualification
1	Germany	3	3	0	6	6	0	MAX	146	103	1.417	Main round
2	United States	3	2	1	4	4	4	1.000	127	129	0.984	Main round
3	Qatar	3	1	2	2	3	4	0.750	121	141	0.858	Main round
4	Uruguay	3	0	3	0	1	6	0.167	120	141	0.851	Consolation round

Source: IHF
Rules for classification: 1) Points; 2) Head-to-head points; 3) Head-to-head set difference; 4) Head-to-head points won; 5) Set difference; 6) Points won; 7) Draw.

18 June 2024; 16:40	Germany	2–0	Uruguay	Court 3 Attendance: 66; Referees: Sergio Martínez (ESP), Victor Rolland (ESP)
18 June 2024; 16:40	(24–20, 23–17); Report			Court 3 Attendance: 66; Referees: Sergio Martínez (ESP), Victor Rolland (ESP)

18 June 2024; 16:40	Qatar	1–2	United States	Court 2 Attendance: 20; Referees: Jonas Primdahl (DEN), Nichlas Nygaard (DEN)
18 June 2024; 16:40	(18–28, 20–12, 2–8); Report			Court 2 Attendance: 20; Referees: Jonas Primdahl (DEN), Nichlas Nygaard (DEN)

19 June 2024; 09:30	Uruguay	0–2	Qatar	Court 2 Attendance: 50; Referees: Mathieu Fanack (FRA), Cédric Daré (FRA)
19 June 2024; 09:30	(18–22, 22–23); Report			Court 2 Attendance: 50; Referees: Mathieu Fanack (FRA), Cédric Daré (FRA)

19 June 2024; 09:30	United States	0–2	Germany	Central court Attendance: 20; Referees: Coriana Constantin (ROU), Daniela-Andreea Enache (ROU)
19 June 2024; 09:30	(12–26, 18–20); Report			Central court Attendance: 20; Referees: Coriana Constantin (ROU), Daniela-Andreea Enache (ROU)

19 June 2024; 15:00	Uruguay	1–2	United States	Court 2 Attendance: 10; Referees: Jonas Primdahl (DEN), Nichlas Nygaard (DEN)
19 June 2024; 15:00	(18–27, 18–14, 7–8); Report			Court 2 Attendance: 10; Referees: Jonas Primdahl (DEN), Nichlas Nygaard (DEN)

19 June 2024; 15:00	Germany	2–0	Qatar	Central court Attendance: 50; Referees: Mathieu Fanack (FRA), Cédric Daré (FRA)
19 June 2024; 15:00	(27–20, 26–16); Report			Central court Attendance: 50; Referees: Mathieu Fanack (FRA), Cédric Daré (FRA)

== Consolation round ==
Pos	Team	Pld	W	L	Pts	SW	SL	SR	SPW	SPL	SPR
1	Uruguay	3	3	0	6	6	1	6.000	149	111	1.342
2	Australia	3	1	2	2 (Note: Australia 2 Pts, ±0 SD, +3 SP; Puerto Rico, 2 Pts, ±0 SD, −1 PD; China 2 Pts, ±0 SD, −2 PD.)	2	4	0.500	114	127	0.898
3	Puerto Rico	3	1	2	2	2	4	0.500	114	131	0.870
4	China (H)	3	1	2	2	3	4	0.750	125	133	0.940

Source: IHF
Rules for classification: 1) Points; 2) Head-to-head points; 3) Head-to-head set difference; 4) Head-to-head points won; 5) Set difference; 6) Points won; 7) Draw.
(H) Host
Notes:

20 June 2024; 15:40	China	1–2	Uruguay	Central court Attendance: 100; Referees: Sergio Martínez (ESP), Victor Rolland (ESP)
20 June 2024; 15:40	(23–20, 18–26, 4–5); Report			Central court Attendance: 100; Referees: Sergio Martínez (ESP), Victor Rolland (ESP)

20 June 2024; 16:30	Australia	2–0	Puerto Rico	Court 4 Attendance: 10; Referees: Jonas Primdahl (DEN), Nichlas Nygaard (DEN)
20 June 2024; 16:30	(20–16, 24–20); Report			Court 4 Attendance: 10; Referees: Jonas Primdahl (DEN), Nichlas Nygaard (DEN)

21 June 2024; 09:30	Uruguay	2–0	Australia	Court 2 Attendance: 15; Referees: Bjarne Deiters (GER), Jesper Stumpfe (GER)
21 June 2024; 09:30	(28–16, 24–20); Report			Court 2 Attendance: 15; Referees: Bjarne Deiters (GER), Jesper Stumpfe (GER)

21 June 2024; 10:20	Puerto Rico	2–0	China	Court 2 Attendance: 10; Referees: Sergio Martínez (ESP), Victor Rolland (ESP)
21 June 2024; 10:20	(26–25, 22–16); Report			Court 2 Attendance: 10; Referees: Sergio Martínez (ESP), Victor Rolland (ESP)

21 June 2024; 16:30	Puerto Rico	0–2	Uruguay	Court 4 Attendance: 10; Referees: Mery Diaz (ARG), Soledad Vignoni (ARG)
21 June 2024; 16:30	(22–24, 8–22); Report			Court 4 Attendance: 10; Referees: Mery Diaz (ARG), Soledad Vignoni (ARG)

21 June 2024; 16:30	Australia	0–2	China	Court 2 Attendance: 50; Referees: Jonas Primdahl (DEN), Nichlas Nygaard (DEN)
21 June 2024; 16:30	(20–21, 14–18); Report			Court 2 Attendance: 50; Referees: Jonas Primdahl (DEN), Nichlas Nygaard (DEN)

== Main round ==
Points obtained against teams from the same group are carried over.

=== Group I ===
Pos	Team	Pld	W	L	Pts	SW	SL	SR	SPW	SPL	SPR	Qualification
1	Denmark	5	4	1	8 (Note: Denmark 2–1 Brazil)	9	3	3.000	202	179	1.128	Quarterfinals
2	Brazil	5	4	1	8	9	3	3.000	204	158	1.291	Quarterfinals
3	Spain	5	3	2	6 (Note: Hungary 0–2 Spain)	7	5	1.400	235	211	1.114	Quarterfinals
4	Hungary	5	3	2	6	6	5	1.200	204	188	1.085	Quarterfinals
5	Tunisia	5	1	4	2	2	8	0.250	148	196	0.755	
6	Oman	5	0	5	0	1	10	0.100	136	187	0.727	

Source: IHF
Rules for classification: 1) Points; 2) Head-to-head points; 3) Head-to-head set difference; 4) Head-to-head points won; 5) Set difference; 6) Points won; 7) Draw.
Notes:

20 June 2024; 16:30	Denmark	2–0	Spain	Central court Attendance: 100; Referees: Bjarne Deiters (GER), Jesper Stumpfe (GER)
20 June 2024; 16:30	(25–16, 23–22); Report			Central court Attendance: 100; Referees: Bjarne Deiters (GER), Jesper Stumpfe (GER)

20 June 2024; 17:20	Hungary	2–0	Tunisia	Central court Attendance: 100; Referees: Coriana Constantin (ROU), Daniela-Andreea Enache (ROU)
20 June 2024; 17:20	(26–12, 20–18); Report			Central court Attendance: 100; Referees: Coriana Constantin (ROU), Daniela-Andreea Enache (ROU)

20 June 2024; 17:20	Oman	0–2	Brazil	Court 2 Attendance: 50; Referees: Mery Diaz (ARG), Soledad Vignoni (ARG)
20 June 2024; 17:20	(14–20, 4–20); Report			Court 2 Attendance: 50; Referees: Mery Diaz (ARG), Soledad Vignoni (ARG)

21 June 2024; 09:30	Hungary	0–2	Spain	Central court Attendance: 50; Referees: Mathieu Fanack (FRA), Cédric Daré (FRA)
21 June 2024; 09:30	(23–26, 22–27); Report			Central court Attendance: 50; Referees: Mathieu Fanack (FRA), Cédric Daré (FRA)

21 June 2024; 10:20	Denmark	2–1	Brazil	Central court Attendance: 100; Referees: Coriana Constantin (ROU), Daniela-Andreea Enache (ROU)
21 June 2024; 10:20	(14–18, 25–24, 9–8); Report			Central court Attendance: 100; Referees: Coriana Constantin (ROU), Daniela-Andreea Enache (ROU)

21 June 2024; 10:20	Oman	0–2	Tunisia	Court 3 Attendance: 20; Referees: José Galeano (PAR), José Rodrigues (PAR)
21 June 2024; 10:20	(14–16, 14–16); Report			Court 3 Attendance: 20; Referees: José Galeano (PAR), José Rodrigues (PAR)

21 June 2024; 16:30	Denmark	2–0	Tunisia	Central court Attendance: 80; Referees: José Galeano (PAR), José Rodrigues (PAR)
21 June 2024; 16:30	(20–18, 20–8); Report			Central court Attendance: 80; Referees: José Galeano (PAR), José Rodrigues (PAR)

21 June 2024; 17:20	Hungary	0–2	Brazil	Central court Attendance: 120; Referees: Soleyman Payda (IRI), Mohammad Kiani (IRI)
21 June 2024; 17:20	(18–19, 14–16); Report			Central court Attendance: 120; Referees: Soleyman Payda (IRI), Mohammad Kiani (IRI)

21 June 2024; 17:20	Oman	1–2	Spain	Court 3 Attendance: 30; Referees: Bjarne Deiters (GER), Jesper Stumpfe (GER)
21 June 2024; 17:20	(20–32, 21–20, 6–8); Report			Court 3 Attendance: 30; Referees: Bjarne Deiters (GER), Jesper Stumpfe (GER)

=== Group II ===
Pos	Team	Pld	W	L	Pts	SW	SL	SR	SPW	SPL	SPR	Qualification
1	Croatia	5	5	0	10	10	1	10.000	216	183	1.180	Quarterfinals
2	Germany	5	4	1	8	8	2	4.000	224	169	1.325	Quarterfinals
3	Portugal	5	3	2	6	6	5	1.200	199	188	1.059	Quarterfinals
4	Argentina	5	2	3	4	4	8	0.500	183	217	0.843	Quarterfinals
5	United States	5	1	4	2	4	9	0.444	206	237	0.869	
6	Qatar	5	0	5	0	3	10	0.300	202	236	0.856	

Source: IHF
Rules for classification: 1) Points; 2) Head-to-head points; 3) Head-to-head set difference; 4) Head-to-head points won; 5) Set difference; 6) Points won; 7) Draw.

20 June 2024; 18:10	Portugal	2–0	United States	Court 3 Attendance: 50; Referees: Cao Hongjun (CHN), Xu Jian (CHN)
20 June 2024; 18:10	(23–18, 23–17); Report			Court 3 Attendance: 50; Referees: Cao Hongjun (CHN), Xu Jian (CHN)

20 June 2024; 18:10	Croatia	2–0	Qatar	Court 2 Attendance: 100; Referees: Sergio Martínez (ESP), Victor Rolland (ESP)
20 June 2024; 18:10	(20–18, 20–19); Report			Court 2 Attendance: 100; Referees: Sergio Martínez (ESP), Victor Rolland (ESP)

20 June 2024; 19:00	Argentina	0–2	Germany	Central court Attendance: 450; Referees: Jonas Primdahl (DEN), Nichlas Nygaard (DEN)
20 June 2024; 19:00	(14–21, 12–18); Report			Central court Attendance: 450; Referees: Jonas Primdahl (DEN), Nichlas Nygaard (DEN)

21 June 2024; 11:10	Croatia	2–1	United States	Court 3 Attendance: 30; Referees: Cao Hongjun (CHN), Xu Jian (CHN)
21 June 2024; 11:10	(20–22, 26–16, 6–4); Report			Court 3 Attendance: 30; Referees: Cao Hongjun (CHN), Xu Jian (CHN)

21 June 2024; 11:10	Argentina	2–1	Qatar	Central court Attendance: 50; Referees: Mathieu Fanack (FRA), Cédric Daré (FRA)
21 June 2024; 11:10	(20–18, 16–17, 11–10); Report			Central court Attendance: 50; Referees: Mathieu Fanack (FRA), Cédric Daré (FRA)

21 June 2024; 12:00	Portugal	0–2	Germany	Court 2 Attendance: 30; Referees: José Galeano (PAR), José Rodrigues (PAR)
21 June 2024; 12:00	(18–25, 12–17); Report			Court 2 Attendance: 30; Referees: José Galeano (PAR), José Rodrigues (PAR)

21 June 2024; 19:00	Argentina	2–1	United States	Central court Attendance: 500; Referees: Soleyman Payda (IRI), Mohammad Kiani (IRI)
21 June 2024; 19:00	(18–19, 26–24, 9–8); Report			Central court Attendance: 500; Referees: Soleyman Payda (IRI), Mohammad Kiani (IRI)

21 June 2024; 19:00	Portugal	2–1	Qatar	Court 3 Attendance: 50; Referees: Coriana Constantin (ROU), Daniela-Andreea Enache (ROU)
21 June 2024; 19:00	(18–20, 23–18, 7–6); Report			Court 3 Attendance: 50; Referees: Coriana Constantin (ROU), Daniela-Andreea Enache (ROU)

21 June 2024; 19:00	Croatia	2–0	Germany	Court 2 Attendance: 100; Referees: Sergio Martínez (ESP), Victor Rolland (ESP)
21 June 2024; 19:00	(25–24, 22–20); Report			Court 2 Attendance: 100; Referees: Sergio Martínez (ESP), Victor Rolland (ESP)

== Knockout stage ==
=== Bracket ===
Championship bracket

Quarter-finals
22 June
Denmark	2
Argentina	0
22 June
Germany	2
Spain	1
22 June
Brazil	1
Portugal	2
22 June
Croatia	2
Hungary	1

Semi-finals
22 June
Denmark	2
Germany	0
22 June
Portugal	0
Croatia	2

Final
23 June
Denmark	1
Croatia	2
Third place
23 June
Germany	0
Portugal	2

Fifth place bracket

5–8th place semifinals
22 June
Argentina	0
Spain	2
22 June
Brazil	2
Hungary	1

Fifth place game
23 June
Spain	2
Brazil	1
Seventh place game
23 June
Argentina	1
Hungary	2

9–16th place bracket

9–16th place quarterfinals
22 June
United States	0
China	2
22 June
Oman	1
Uruguay	2
22 June
Tunisia	2
Puerto Rico	0
22 June
Qatar	2
Australia	0

9–12th place semifinals
22 June
China	0
Uruguay	2
22 June
Tunisia	1
Qatar	2

Ninth place game
23 June
Uruguay	2
Qatar	1
Eleventh place game
23 June
China	0
Tunisia	2

13–16th place bracket

13–16th place semifinals
22 June
United States	2
Oman	1
22 June
Puerto Rico	1
Australia	2

13th place game
23 June
United States	2
Australia	0
15th place game
23 June
Oman	2
Puerto Rico	0

=== 9–16th place quarterfinals ===
22 June 2024; 10:20	Oman	1–2	Uruguay	Court 4 Attendance: 20; Referees: Bjarne Deiters (GER), Jesper Stumpfe (GER)
22 June 2024; 10:20	(19–16, 16–18, 6–7); Report			Court 4 Attendance: 20; Referees: Bjarne Deiters (GER), Jesper Stumpfe (GER)

22 June 2024; 10:20	Qatar	2–0	Australia	Court 3 Attendance: 10; Referees: José Galeano (PAR), José Rodrigues (PAR)
22 June 2024; 10:20	(24–12, 24–10); Report			Court 3 Attendance: 10; Referees: José Galeano (PAR), José Rodrigues (PAR)

22 June 2024; 10:20	United States	0–2	China	Central court Attendance: 100; Referees: Mathieu Fanack (FRA), Cédric Daré (FRA)
22 June 2024; 10:20	(18–19, 22–24); Report			Central court Attendance: 100; Referees: Mathieu Fanack (FRA), Cédric Daré (FRA)

22 June 2024; 10:20	Tunisia	2–0	Puerto Rico	Court 2 Attendance: 10; Referees: Jonas Primdahl (DEN), Nichlas Nygaard (DEN)
22 June 2024; 10:20	(22–16, 19–16); Report			Court 2 Attendance: 10; Referees: Jonas Primdahl (DEN), Nichlas Nygaard (DEN)

=== Quarterfinals ===
22 June 2024; 12:00	Denmark	2–0	Argentina	Central court Attendance: 10; Referees: Bjarne Deiters (GER), Jesper Stumpfe (GER)
22 June 2024; 12:00	(21–16, 18–17); Report			Central court Attendance: 10; Referees: Bjarne Deiters (GER), Jesper Stumpfe (GER)

22 June 2024; 12:00	Croatia	2–1	Hungary	Court 2 Attendance: 50; Referees: Jonas Primdahl (DEN), Nichlas Nygaard (DEN)
22 June 2024; 12:00	(27–26, 16–21, 8–6); Report			Court 2 Attendance: 50; Referees: Jonas Primdahl (DEN), Nichlas Nygaard (DEN)

22 June 2024; 12:00	Germany	2–1	Spain	Court 4 Attendance: 30; Referees: Mathieu Fanack (FRA), Cédric Daré (FRA)
22 June 2024; 12:00	(27–20, 26–27, 9–8); Report			Court 4 Attendance: 30; Referees: Mathieu Fanack (FRA), Cédric Daré (FRA)

22 June 2024; 12:00	Brazil	1–2	Portugal	Court 3 Attendance: 10; Referees: José Galeano (PAR), José Rodrigues (PAR)
22 June 2024; 12:00	(15–17, 19–14, 8–10); Report			Court 3 Attendance: 10; Referees: José Galeano (PAR), José Rodrigues (PAR)

=== 13–16th place semifinals ===
22 June 2024; 16:50	Puerto Rico	1–2	Australia	Court 4 Attendance: 60; Referees: Bjarne Deiters (GER), Jesper Stumpfe (GER)
22 June 2024; 16:50	(26–22, 18–25, 4–7); Report			Court 4 Attendance: 60; Referees: Bjarne Deiters (GER), Jesper Stumpfe (GER)

22 June 2024; 16:50	United States	2–1	Oman	Court 3 Attendance: 50; Referees: Sergio Martínez (ESP), Victor Rolland (ESP)
22 June 2024; 16:50	(21–29, 23–22, 10–7); Report			Court 3 Attendance: 50; Referees: Sergio Martínez (ESP), Victor Rolland (ESP)

=== 9–12th place semifinals ===
22 June 2024; 16:50	China	0–2	Uruguay	Central court Attendance: 200; Referees: Mathieu Fanack (FRA), Cédric Daré (FRA)
22 June 2024; 16:50	(20–26, 20–26); Report			Central court Attendance: 200; Referees: Mathieu Fanack (FRA), Cédric Daré (FRA)

22 June 2024; 16:50	Tunisia	1–2	Qatar	Court 2 Attendance: 10; Referees: Soleyman Payda (IRI), Mohammad Kiani (IRI)
22 June 2024; 16:50	(18–20, 22–18, 6–7); Report			Court 2 Attendance: 10; Referees: Soleyman Payda (IRI), Mohammad Kiani (IRI)

=== 5–8th place semifinals ===
22 June 2024; 18:30	Hungary	1–2	Brazil	Court 3 Attendance: 30; Referees: Sergio Martínez (ESP), Victor Rolland (ESP)
22 June 2024; 18:30	(17–22, 23–22, 16–17); Report			Court 3 Attendance: 30; Referees: Sergio Martínez (ESP), Victor Rolland (ESP)

22 June 2024; 18:30	Argentina	0–2	Spain	Court 2 Attendance: 20; Referees: Jonas Primdahl (DEN), Nichlas Nygaard (DEN)
22 June 2024; 18:30	(20–25, 20–23); Report			Court 2 Attendance: 20; Referees: Jonas Primdahl (DEN), Nichlas Nygaard (DEN)

=== Semifinals ===
22 June 2024; 19:20	Croatia	2–0	Portugal	Central court Attendance: 580; Referees: Bjarne Deiters (GER), Jesper Stumpfe (GER)
22 June 2024; 19:20	(27–24, 22–14); Report			Central court Attendance: 580; Referees: Bjarne Deiters (GER), Jesper Stumpfe (GER)

22 June 2024; 20:10	Denmark	2–0	Germany	Central court Attendance: 680; Referees: Mathieu Fanack (FRA), Cédric Daré (FRA)
22 June 2024; 20:10	(25–18, 21–20); Report			Central court Attendance: 680; Referees: Mathieu Fanack (FRA), Cédric Daré (FRA)

=== 15th place game ===
23 June 2024; 09:30	Oman	2–0	Puerto Rico	Court 4 Attendance: 20; Referees: Jonas Primdahl (DEN), Nichlas Nygaard (DEN)
23 June 2024; 09:30	(26–10, 25–16); Report			Court 4 Attendance: 20; Referees: Jonas Primdahl (DEN), Nichlas Nygaard (DEN)

=== 13th place game ===
23 June 2024; 09:30	United States	2–0	Australia	Court 3 Attendance: 10; Referees: José Galeano (PAR), José Rodrigues (PAR)
23 June 2024; 09:30	(25–20, 25–20); Report			Court 3 Attendance: 10; Referees: José Galeano (PAR), José Rodrigues (PAR)

=== Eleventh place game ===
23 June 2024; 09:30	China	0–2	Tunisia	Court 2 Attendance: 10; Referees: Mathieu Fanack (FRA), Cédric Daré (FRA)
23 June 2024; 09:30	(14–15, 20–26); Report			Court 2 Attendance: 10; Referees: Mathieu Fanack (FRA), Cédric Daré (FRA)

=== Ninth place game ===
23 June 2024; 10:20	Uruguay	2–1	Qatar	Court 2 Attendance: 10; Referees: Bjarne Deiters (GER), Jesper Stumpfe (GER)
23 June 2024; 10:20	(22–23, 18–16, 9–8); Report			Court 2 Attendance: 10; Referees: Bjarne Deiters (GER), Jesper Stumpfe (GER)

=== Seventh place game ===
23 June 2024; 09:30	Argentina	1–2	Hungary	Central court Attendance: 60; Referees: Soleyman Payda (IRI), Mohammad Kiani (IRI)
23 June 2024; 09:30	(16–22, 21–18, 6–8); Report			Central court Attendance: 60; Referees: Soleyman Payda (IRI), Mohammad Kiani (IRI)

=== Fifth place game ===
23 June 2024; 11:10	Spain	2–1	Brazil	Central court Attendance: 100; Referees: Jonas Primdahl (DEN), Nichlas Nygaard (DEN)
23 June 2024; 11:10	(27–26, 18–20, 10–8); Report			Central court Attendance: 100; Referees: Jonas Primdahl (DEN), Nichlas Nygaard (DEN)

=== Third place game ===
23 June 2024; 17:30	Germany	0–2	Portugal	Central court Attendance: 600; Referees: Jonas Primdahl (DEN), Nichlas Nygaard (DEN)
23 June 2024; 17:30	(24–25, 18–20); Report			Central court Attendance: 600; Referees: Jonas Primdahl (DEN), Nichlas Nygaard (DEN)

=== Final ===
23 June 2024; 19:30	Denmark	1–2	Croatia	Central court Attendance: 1,000; Referees: Sergio Martínez (ESP), Victor Rolland (ESP)
23 June 2024; 19:30	(18–23, 23–18, 6–9); Report			Central court Attendance: 1,000; Referees: Sergio Martínez (ESP), Victor Rolland (ESP)

== Final ranking ==
Rank	Team
1st place, gold medalist(s)	Croatia
2nd place, silver medalist(s)	Denmark
3rd place, bronze medalist(s)	Portugal
4	Germany
5	Spain
6	Brazil
7	Hungary
8	Argentina
9	Uruguay
10	Qatar
11	Tunisia
12	China
13	United States
14	Australia
15	Oman
16	Puerto Rico

== Statistics and awards ==
=== Top goalscorers ===
Rank	Name	Points
1	(Uruguay) Santiago Rodríguez	155
2	(Hungary) Norbert Gyene	144
3	(Croatia) Lucian Bura	130
4	(Qatar) Amir Nowraddine	130
5	(Spain) Gonzalo Cervera	129
6	(Denmark) Martin Andersen	120
7	(Australia) Ignacio Oleaga	117
8	(Brazil) Matheus Medeiros	112
9	(Denmark) Simon Moss	111
10	(Portugal) Ruben Ribeiro	105

Source: IHF

=== Top goalkeepers ===
Rank	Name	%	Saves	Shots
1	(Tunisia) Wassim Zariat	34	21	61
2	(Croatia) Filip Hančić	31	45	144
3	(Denmark) Andreas Høgh	30	22	73
4	(Oman) Bashar Al-Hinai	30	26	87
5	(Oman) Hudhaifa Al-Siyabi	29	43	146
6	(Hungary) Ádám Balogh	29	35	122
7	(Croatia) Stipe Maleničić	28	27	96
7	(Tunisia) Soussi Marwane	28	49	174
9	(Brazil) Cristiano Seben	27	56	208
10	(United States) Bryan Cook	26	40	153

Source: IHF

=== Awards ===
The awards were announced on 23 June 2024.

Position	Player
MVP	(Croatia) Ivan Dumenčić
Goalkeeper	(Portugal) Ricardo Castro
Right wing	(Croatia) Lucian Bura
Left wing	(Spain) Gonzalo Cervera
Specialist	(Denmark) Martin Andersen
Pivot	(Denmark) Martin Vilstrup Andersen
Defender	(Germany) Severin Henrich
Fair play award	Croatia
