= 2022 Men's Beach Handball World Championships =

Tournament details
- Host country: Greece
- Venue(s): Karteros Beach Sports Center
- Dates: 21–26 June
- Teams: 16 (from 5 confederations)

Final positions
- Champions: Croatia (3rd title)
- Runner-up: Denmark
- Third place: Brazil
- Fourth place: Greece

Tournament statistics
- Top scorer(s): (Croatia) Lucian Bura (164 points)

Awards
- Best player: (Croatia) Lucian Bura

The 2022 Men's IHF Beach Handball World Championships was the ninth edition of the championship, held from 21 to 26 June 2022 at Crete, Greece under the aegis of International Handball Federation (IHF). It was the first time in history that the championship is organised by Hellenic Handball Federation.

Croatia won their third title after defeating Denmark in the final.

== Qualification ==
Qualification	Vacancies	Qualified
Host	1	Greece
Defending champion	1	Brazil
2022 African Beach Handball Championship	1	Egypt
2022 Asian Beach Handball Championship	2	Iran; Qatar
2021 European Beach Handball Championship	5	Croatia; Denmark; Norway; ~~Russia~~; Portugal; Spain
2022 South and Central American Beach Handball Championship	3	Argentina; Ecuador; Uruguay
2022 Oceania Beach Handball Championship	1	New Zealand
2022 Nor.ca Beach Handball Championship	2	Puerto Rico; United States

- Russia was excluded due to the 2022 Russian invasion of Ukraine.

== Draw ==
The draw took place on 13 May 2022.

== Preliminary round ==
All times are local (UTC+3).

=== Group A ===
Pos	Team	Pld	W	L	Pts	SW	SL	SR	SPW	SPL	SPR	Qualification
1	Greece (H)	3	3	0	6	6	0	MAX	146	124	1.177	Main round
2	United States	3	2	1	4	4	3	1.333	136	112	1.214	Main round
3	Argentina	3	1	2	2	3	4	0.750	133	124	1.073	Main round
4	Puerto Rico	3	0	3	0	0	6	0.000	88	143	0.615	Consolation round

Source: IHF
Rules for classification: 1) Points; 2) Head-to-head points; 3) Head-to-head set difference; 4) Head-to-head points won; 5) Set difference; 6) Points won; 7) Draw.
(H) Host

21 June 2022; 11:30	Argentina	1–2	United States	Court 3 Referees: Luciano Cardone (ITA), Sebatiano Manuele (ITA)
21 June 2022; 11:30	(23–22, 16–18, 6–7); Report			Court 3 Referees: Luciano Cardone (ITA), Sebatiano Manuele (ITA)

21 June 2022; 14:00	Greece	2–0	Puerto Rico	Center court Referees: Mohamed Ben Salah (TUN), Mohamed Drissi (TUN)
21 June 2022; 14:00	(30–13, 27–20); Report			Center court Referees: Mohamed Ben Salah (TUN), Mohamed Drissi (TUN)

21 June 2022; 17:30	Puerto Rico	0–2	Argentina	Court 3 Referees: Ana Barbosa (POR), Nádia Lemos (POR)
21 June 2022; 17:30	(12–26, 11–16); Report			Court 3 Referees: Ana Barbosa (POR), Nádia Lemos (POR)

21 June 2022; 20:10	United States	0–2	Greece	Center court Referees: Sylwia Bartkowiak (POL), Weronika Łakomy (POL)
21 June 2022; 20:10	(17–25, 18–20); Report			Center court Referees: Sylwia Bartkowiak (POL), Weronika Łakomy (POL)

22 June 2022; 18:20	United States	2–0	Puerto Rico	Court 2 Referees: Sydiney Dos Santos (BRA), Flavio Asis (BRA)
22 June 2022; 18:20	(24–18, 20–14); Report			Court 2 Referees: Sydiney Dos Santos (BRA), Flavio Asis (BRA)

22 June 2022; 18:20	Argentina	0–2	Greece	Center court Referees: Dario Rupčić (CRO), Ivica Botinčan (CRO)
22 June 2022; 18:20	(24–27, 22–27); Report			Center court Referees: Dario Rupčić (CRO), Ivica Botinčan (CRO)

=== Group B ===
Pos	Team	Pld	W	L	Pts	SW	SL	SR	SPW	SPL	SPR	Qualification
1	Croatia	3	3	0	6	6	1	6.000	156	136	1.147	Main round
2	Uruguay	3	2	1	4	4	3	1.333	129	130	0.992	Main round
3	Spain	3	1	2	2	4	4	1.000	150	144	1.042	Main round
4	Ecuador	3	0	3	0	0	6	0.000	100	125	0.800	Consolation round

Source: IHF
Rules for classification: 1) Points; 2) Head-to-head points; 3) Head-to-head set difference; 4) Head-to-head points won; 5) Set difference; 6) Points won; 7) Draw.

21 June 2022; 09:00	Spain	2–0	Ecuador	Court 3 Referees: Khalid Al-Hail (QAT), Ali Al-Yafei (QAT)
21 June 2022; 09:00	(18–15, 23–18); Report			Court 3 Referees: Khalid Al-Hail (QAT), Ali Al-Yafei (QAT)

21 June 2022; 09:00	Croatia	2–0	Uruguay	Court 2 Referees: Johan Gomér (SWE), Martin Gomér (SWE)
21 June 2022; 09:00	(28–22, 24–18); Report			Court 2 Referees: Johan Gomér (SWE), Martin Gomér (SWE)

21 June 2022; 15:00	Uruguay	2–1	Spain	Court 2 Referees: Mohamed Ben Salah (TUN), Mohamed Drissi (TUN)
21 June 2022; 15:00	(26–24, 24–28, 7–2); Report			Court 2 Referees: Mohamed Ben Salah (TUN), Mohamed Drissi (TUN)

21 June 2022; 15:50	Ecuador	0–2	Croatia	Court 2 Referees: Sylwia Bartkowiak (POL), Weronika Łakomy (POL)
21 June 2022; 15:50	(18–23, 25–27); Report			Court 2 Referees: Sylwia Bartkowiak (POL), Weronika Łakomy (POL)

22 June 2022; 11:20	Uruguay	2–0	Ecuador	Court 2 Referees: Ana Barbosa (POR), Nádia Lemos (POR)
22 June 2022; 11:20	(12–10, 20–14); Report			Court 2 Referees: Ana Barbosa (POR), Nádia Lemos (POR)

22 June 2022; 11:20	Croatia	2–1	Spain	Center court Referees: Sydiney Dos Santos (BRA), Flavio Asis (BRA)
22 June 2022; 11:20	(19–18, 26–27, 9–8); Report			Center court Referees: Sydiney Dos Santos (BRA), Flavio Asis (BRA)

=== Group C ===
Pos	Team	Pld	W	L	Pts	SW	SL	SR	SPW	SPL	SPR	Qualification
1	Denmark	3	3	0	6	6	1	6.000	135	99	1.364	Main round
2	Norway	3	2	1	4	4	3	1.333	150	134	1.119	Main round
3	Iran	3	1	2	2	3	5	0.600	116	140	0.829	Main round
4	Egypt	3	0	3	0	2	6	0.333	122	148	0.824	Consolation round

Source: IHF
Rules for classification: 1) Points; 2) Head-to-head points; 3) Head-to-head set difference; 4) Head-to-head points won; 5) Set difference; 6) Points won; 7) Draw.

21 June 2022; 09:00	Denmark	2–0	Iran	Center court Referees: Pedro Ortega (VEN), Miguel Aular (VEN)
21 June 2022; 09:00	(23–10, 20–12); Report			Center court Referees: Pedro Ortega (VEN), Miguel Aular (VEN)

21 June 2022; 09:50	Norway	2–0	Egypt	Center court Referees: Sydiney Dos Santos (BRA), Flavio Asis (BRA)
21 June 2022; 09:50	(28–20, 28–20); Report			Center court Referees: Sydiney Dos Santos (BRA), Flavio Asis (BRA)

21 June 2022; 15:00	Egypt	1–2	Denmark	Center court Referees: Mathieu Fanack (FRA), Cédric Daré (FRA)
21 June 2022; 15:00	(22–21, 18–24, 4–5); Report			Center court Referees: Mathieu Fanack (FRA), Cédric Daré (FRA)

21 June 2022; 15:50	Iran	1–2	Norway	Center court Referees: Johan Gomér (SWE), Martin Gomér (SWE)
21 June 2022; 15:50	(23–30, 21–20, 8–9); Report			Center court Referees: Johan Gomér (SWE), Martin Gomér (SWE)

22 June 2022; 15:00	Denmark	2–0	Norway	Center court Referees: Khalid Al-Hail (QAT), Ali Al-Yafei (QAT)
22 June 2022; 15:00	(18–16, 24–19); Report			Center court Referees: Khalid Al-Hail (QAT), Ali Al-Yafei (QAT)

22 June 2022; 15:00	Iran	2–1	Egypt	Court 2 Referees: Luciano Cardone (ITA), Sebatiano Manuele (ITA)
22 June 2022; 15:00	(20–12, 16–22, 6–4); Report			Court 2 Referees: Luciano Cardone (ITA), Sebatiano Manuele (ITA)

=== Group D ===
Pos	Team	Pld	W	L	Pts	SW	SL	SR	SPW	SPL	SPR	Qualification
1	Brazil	3	3	0	6	6	1	6.000	132	95	1.389	Main round
2	Qatar	3	2	1	4	5	3	1.667	147	116	1.267	Main round
3	Portugal	3	1	2	2	3	4	0.750	141	134	1.052	Main round
4	New Zealand	3	0	3	0	0	6	0.000	92	167	0.551	Consolation round

Source: IHF
Rules for classification: 1) Points; 2) Head-to-head points; 3) Head-to-head set difference; 4) Head-to-head points won; 5) Set difference; 6) Points won; 7) Draw.

21 June 2022; 09:50	Portugal	2–0	New Zealand	Court 3 Referees: Mohamed Ben Salah (TUN), Mohamed Drissi (TUN)
21 June 2022; 09:50	(32–20, 25–16); Report			Court 3 Referees: Mohamed Ben Salah (TUN), Mohamed Drissi (TUN)

21 June 2022; 09:50	Brazil	2–1	Qatar	Court 2 Referees: Luciano Cardone (ITA), Sebatiano Manuele (ITA)
21 June 2022; 09:50	(16–17, 14–10, 8–6); Report			Court 2 Referees: Luciano Cardone (ITA), Sebatiano Manuele (ITA)

21 June 2022; 15:50	New Zealand	0–2	Brazil	Court 3 Referees: Luciano Cardone (ITA), Sebatiano Manuele (ITA)
21 June 2022; 15:50	(16–26, 16–26); Report			Court 3 Referees: Luciano Cardone (ITA), Sebatiano Manuele (ITA)

21 June 2022; 16:40	Qatar	2–1	Portugal	Court 2 Referees: Pedro Ortega (VEN), Miguel Aular (VEN)
21 June 2022; 16:40	(23–20, 24–26, 9–8); Report			Court 2 Referees: Pedro Ortega (VEN), Miguel Aular (VEN)

22 June 2022; 15:50	Qatar	2–0	New Zealand	Court 3 Referees: Sylwia Bartkowiak (POL), Weronika Łakomy (POL)
22 June 2022; 15:50	(30–14, 28–10); Report			Court 3 Referees: Sylwia Bartkowiak (POL), Weronika Łakomy (POL)

22 June 2022; 15:50	Brazil	2–0	Portugal	Court 2 Referees: Johan Gomér (SWE), Martin Gomér (SWE)
22 June 2022; 15:50	(21–16, 21–14); Report			Court 2 Referees: Johan Gomér (SWE), Martin Gomér (SWE)

== Consolation round ==
Pos	Team	Pld	W	L	Pts	SW	SL	SR	SPW	SPL	SPR
1	Ecuador	3	3	0	6	6	1	6.000	132	115	1.148
2	Egypt	3	2	1	4	5	2	2.500	138	118	1.169
3	New Zealand	3	1	2	2	2	4	0.500	110	121	0.909
4	Puerto Rico	3	0	3	0	0	6	0.000	113	139	0.813

Source: IHF
Rules for classification: 1) Points; 2) Head-to-head points; 3) Head-to-head set difference; 4) Head-to-head points won; 5) Set difference; 6) Points won; 7) Draw.

23 June 2022; 10:40	Puerto Rico	0–2	Egypt	Court 3 Referees: Pedro Ortega (VEN), Miguel Aular (VEN)
23 June 2022; 10:40	(18–22, 25–32); Report			Court 3 Referees: Pedro Ortega (VEN), Miguel Aular (VEN)

23 June 2022; 09:00	Ecuador	2–0	New Zealand	Court 3 Referees: Sydiney Dos Santos (BRA), Flavio Asis (BRA)
23 June 2022; 09:00	(19–14, 25–24); Report			Court 3 Referees: Sydiney Dos Santos (BRA), Flavio Asis (BRA)

23 June 2022; 15:30	Egypt	1–2	Ecuador	Court 3 Referees: Johan Gomér (SWE), Martin Gomér (SWE)
23 June 2022; 15:30	(22–23, 15–12, 10–12); Report			Court 3 Referees: Johan Gomér (SWE), Martin Gomér (SWE)

23 June 2022; 15:30	New Zealand	2–0	Puerto Rico	Court 2 Referees: Khalid Al-Hail (QAT), Ali Al-Yafei (QAT)
23 June 2022; 15:30	(22–20, 22–20); Report			Court 2 Referees: Khalid Al-Hail (QAT), Ali Al-Yafei (QAT)

24 June 2022; 09:30	Puerto Rico	0–2	Ecuador	Court 2 Referees: Sylwia Bartkowiak (POL), Weronika Łakomy (POL)
24 June 2022; 09:30	(16–21, 14–20); Report			Court 2 Referees: Sylwia Bartkowiak (POL), Weronika Łakomy (POL)

24 June 2022; 09:30	Egypt	2–0	New Zealand	Court 3 Referees: Pedro Ortega (VEN), Miguel Aular (VEN)
24 June 2022; 09:30	(25–18, 12–10); Report			Court 3 Referees: Pedro Ortega (VEN), Miguel Aular (VEN)

== Main round ==
Points obtained against teams from the same group were carried over.

=== Group I ===
Pos	Team	Pld	W	L	Pts	SW	SL	SR	SPW	SPL	SPR	Qualification
1	Croatia	5	5	0	10	10	1	10.000	260	214	1.215	Quarterfinals
2	Uruguay	5	3	2	6 (Note: Greece 1–2 Uruguay)	7	7	1.000	252	249	1.012	Quarterfinals
3	Greece (H)	5	3	2	6	7	5	1.400	238	242	0.983	Quarterfinals
4	Spain	5	2	3	4	7	6	1.167	257	238	1.080	Quarterfinals
5	United States	5	1	4	2 (Note: Argentina 1–2 United States)	3	9	0.333	210	236	0.890	
6	Argentina	5	1	4	2	3	9	0.333	215	253	0.850	

Source: IHF
Rules for classification: 1) Points; 2) Head-to-head points; 3) Head-to-head set difference; 4) Head-to-head points won; 5) Set difference; 6) Points won; 7) Draw.
(H) Host
Notes:

23 June 2022; 12:20	Greece	2–1	Spain	Center court Referees: Luciano Cardone (ITA), Sebatiano Manuele (ITA)
23 June 2022; 12:20	(20–30, 20–19, 9–8); Report			Center court Referees: Luciano Cardone (ITA), Sebatiano Manuele (ITA)

23 June 2022; 12:20	Argentina	0–2	Croatia	Court 3 Referees: Sylwia Bartkowiak (POL), Weronika Łakomy (POL)
23 June 2022; 12:20	(16–30, 26–28); Report			Court 3 Referees: Sylwia Bartkowiak (POL), Weronika Łakomy (POL)

23 June 2022; 12:20	United States	1–2	Uruguay	Court 2 Referees: Ana Barbosa (POR), Nádia Lemos (POR)
23 June 2022; 12:20	(21–20, 22–24, 6–10); Report			Court 2 Referees: Ana Barbosa (POR), Nádia Lemos (POR)

23 June 2022; 17:10	Argentina	0–2	Spain	Court 3 Referees: Khalid Al-Hail (QAT), Ali Al-Yafei (QAT)
23 June 2022; 17:10	(22–26, 18–20); Report			Court 3 Referees: Khalid Al-Hail (QAT), Ali Al-Yafei (QAT)

23 June 2022; 17:10	United States	0–2	Croatia	Court 2 Referees: Johan Gomér (SWE), Martin Gomér (SWE)
23 June 2022; 17:10	(20–23, 21–22); Report			Court 2 Referees: Johan Gomér (SWE), Martin Gomér (SWE)

23 June 2022; 20:30	Greece	1–2	Uruguay	Center court Referees: Johan Gomér (SWE), Martin Gomér (SWE)
23 June 2022; 20:30	(18–22, 26–22, 8–9); Report			Center court Referees: Johan Gomér (SWE), Martin Gomér (SWE)

24 June 2022; 18:50	United States	0–2	Spain	Court 2 Referees: Johan Gomér (SWE), Martin Gomér (SWE)
24 June 2022; 18:50	(18–22, 20–25); Report			Court 2 Referees: Johan Gomér (SWE), Martin Gomér (SWE)

24 June 2022; 18:50	Greece	0–2	Croatia	Center court Referees: Sydiney Dos Santos (BRA), Flavio Asis (BRA)
24 June 2022; 18:50	(20–23, 18–28); Report			Center court Referees: Sydiney Dos Santos (BRA), Flavio Asis (BRA)

24 June 2022; 19:40	Argentina	2–1	Uruguay	Center court Referees: Mathieu Fanack (FRA), Cédric Daré (FRA)
24 June 2022; 19:40	(15–24, 21–20, 6–4); Report			Center court Referees: Mathieu Fanack (FRA), Cédric Daré (FRA)

=== Group II ===
Pos	Team	Pld	W	L	Pts	SW	SL	SR	SPW	SPL	SPR	Qualification
1	Brazil	5	5	0	10	10	2	5.000	200	167	1.198	Quarterfinals
2	Qatar	5	3	2	6 (Note: Denmark 1–2 Qatar)	7	7	1.000	245	245	1.000	Quarterfinals
3	Denmark	5	3	2	6	8	4	2.000	231	202	1.144	Quarterfinals
4	Norway	5	2	3	4	5	7	0.714	229	236	0.970	Quarterfinals
5	Iran	5	1	4	2 (Note: Iran 2–1 Portugal)	4	9	0.444	190	232	0.819	
6	Portugal	5	1	4	2	5	9	0.556	224	240	0.933	

Source: IHF
Rules for classification: 1) Points; 2) Head-to-head points; 3) Head-to-head set difference; 4) Head-to-head points won; 5) Set difference; 6) Points won; 7) Draw.
Notes:

23 June 2022; 10:40	Denmark	2–1	Portugal	Center court Referees: Dario Rupčić (CRO), Ivica Botinčan (CRO)
23 June 2022; 10:40	(25–18, 16–21, 7–6); Report			Center court Referees: Dario Rupčić (CRO), Ivica Botinčan (CRO)

23 June 2022; 10:40	Iran	0–2	Brazil	Court 2 Referees: Khalid Al-Hail (QAT), Ali Al-Yafei (QAT)
23 June 2022; 10:40	(12–17, 12–15); Report			Court 2 Referees: Khalid Al-Hail (QAT), Ali Al-Yafei (QAT)

23 June 2022; 11:30	Norway	2–0	Qatar	Center court Referees: Johan Gomér (SWE), Martin Gomér (SWE)
23 June 2022; 11:30	(23–22, 28–26); Report			Center court Referees: Johan Gomér (SWE), Martin Gomér (SWE)

23 June 2022; 16:20	Iran	2–1	Portugal	Court 2 Referees: Mathieu Fanack (FRA), Cédric Daré (FRA)
23 June 2022; 16:20	(22–24, 19–18, 8–6); Report			Court 2 Referees: Mathieu Fanack (FRA), Cédric Daré (FRA)

23 June 2022; 16:20	Norway	0–2	Brazil	Center court Referees: Sylwia Bartkowiak (POL), Weronika Łakomy (POL)
23 June 2022; 16:20	(22–24, 17–23); Report			Center court Referees: Sylwia Bartkowiak (POL), Weronika Łakomy (POL)

23 June 2022; 17:10	Denmark	1–2	Qatar	Center court Referees: Luciano Cardone (ITA), Sebatiano Manuele (ITA)
23 June 2022; 17:10	(24–25, 23–22, 10–12); Report			Center court Referees: Luciano Cardone (ITA), Sebatiano Manuele (ITA)

24 June 2022; 10:20	Denmark	1–2	Brazil	Center court Referees: Johan Gomér (SWE), Martin Gomér (SWE)
24 June 2022; 10:20	(12–16, 21–16, 8–9); Report			Center court Referees: Johan Gomér (SWE), Martin Gomér (SWE)

24 June 2022; 11:10	Norway	1–2	Portugal	Center court Referees: Khalid Al-Hail (QAT), Ali Al-Yafei (QAT)
24 June 2022; 11:10	(20–21, 21–19, 4–7); Report			Center court Referees: Khalid Al-Hail (QAT), Ali Al-Yafei (QAT)

24 June 2022; 12:00	Iran	1–2	Qatar	Center court Referees: Dario Rupčić (CRO), Ivica Botinčan (CRO)
24 June 2022; 12:00	(17–22, 20–19, 8–9); Report			Center court Referees: Dario Rupčić (CRO), Ivica Botinčan (CRO)

== Knockout stage ==
=== Bracket ===
Championship bracket

Quarter-finals
25 June
Croatia	2
Norway	0
25 June
Qatar	1
Greece	2
25 June
Uruguay	1
Denmark	2
25 June
Brazil	2
Spain	0

Semi-finals
25 June
Croatia	2
Greece	1
25 June
Denmark	2
Brazil	1

Final
26 June
Croatia	2
Denmark	0
Third place
26 June
Greece	0
Brazil	2

Fifth place bracket

5–8th place semifinals
25 June
Norway	1
Qatar	2
25 June
Uruguay	2
Spain	0

Fifth place game
26 June
Qatar	2
Uruguay	0
Seventh place game
26 June
Norway	0
Spain	2

9–16th place bracket

9–16th place quarterfinals
25 June
Iran	2
Puerto Rico	0
25 June
Argentina	2
Ecuador	0
25 June
United States	2
New Zealand	1
25 June
Portugal	2
Egypt	1

9–12th place semifinals
25 June
Iran	2
Argentina	1
25 June
United States	0
Portugal	2

Ninth place game
26 June
Iran	2
Portugal	0
Eleventh place game
26 June
Argentina	2
United States	0

13–16th place bracket

13–16th place semifinals
25 June
Puerto Rico	0
Ecuador	2
25 June
New Zealand	2
Egypt	1

13th place game
26 June
Ecuador	2
New Zealand	1
15th place game
26 June
Puerto Rico	0
Egypt	2

=== 9–16th place quarterfinals ===
25 June 2022; 09:50	Argentina	2–0	Ecuador	Court 3 Referees: Khalid Al-Hail (QAT), Ali Al-Yafei (QAT)
25 June 2022; 09:50	(21–20, 18–10); Report			Court 3 Referees: Khalid Al-Hail (QAT), Ali Al-Yafei (QAT)

25 June 2022; 10:40	Iran	2–0	Puerto Rico	Court 2 Referees: Mohamed Ben Salah (TUN), Mohamed Drissi (TUN)
25 June 2022; 10:40	(30–12, 24–13); Report			Court 2 Referees: Mohamed Ben Salah (TUN), Mohamed Drissi (TUN)

25 June 2022; 10:40	United States	2–1	New Zealand	Court 3 Referees: Pedro Ortega (VEN), Miguel Aular (VEN)
25 June 2022; 10:40	(26–20, 23–24, 5–4); Report			Court 3 Referees: Pedro Ortega (VEN), Miguel Aular (VEN)

25 June 2022; 11:30	Portugal	2–1	Egypt	Court 3 Referees: Sydiney Dos Santos (BRA), Flavio Asis (BRA)
25 June 2022; 11:30	(19–18, 12–15, 5–2); Report			Court 3 Referees: Sydiney Dos Santos (BRA), Flavio Asis (BRA)

=== Quarterfinals ===
25 June 2022; 09:30	Croatia	2–0	Norway	Center court Referees: Johan Gomér (SWE), Martin Gomér (SWE)
25 June 2022; 09:30	(24–22, 28–20); Report			Center court Referees: Johan Gomér (SWE), Martin Gomér (SWE)

25 June 2022; 10:40	Greece	2–1	Qatar	Center court Referees: Mathieu Fanack (FRA), Cédric Daré (FRA)
25 June 2022; 10:40	(20–21, 19–14, 15–14); Report			Center court Referees: Mathieu Fanack (FRA), Cédric Daré (FRA)

25 June 2022; 11:30	Spain	0–2	Brazil	Court 2 Referees: Khalid Al-Hail (QAT), Ali Al-Yafei (QAT)
25 June 2022; 11:30	(11–20, 14–22); Report			Court 2 Referees: Khalid Al-Hail (QAT), Ali Al-Yafei (QAT)

25 June 2022; 11:30	Uruguay	1–2	Denmark	Center court Referees: Dario Rupčić (CRO), Ivica Botinčan (CRO)
25 June 2022; 11:30	(16–21, 21–20, 6–9); Report			Center court Referees: Dario Rupčić (CRO), Ivica Botinčan (CRO)

=== 13–16th place semifinals ===
25 June 2022; 16:40	Puerto Rico	0–2	Ecuador	Court 2 Referees: Pedro Ortega (VEN), Miguel Aular (VEN)
25 June 2022; 16:40	(16–17, 22–30); Report			Court 2 Referees: Pedro Ortega (VEN), Miguel Aular (VEN)

25 June 2022; 17:30	New Zealand	2–1	Egypt	Court 3 Referees: Mathieu Fanack (FRA), Cédric Daré (FRA)
25 June 2022; 17:30	(12–23, 23–20, 7–4); Report			Court 3 Referees: Mathieu Fanack (FRA), Cédric Daré (FRA)

=== 9–12th place semifinals ===
25 June 2022; 15:50	Iran	2–1	Argentina	Center court Referees: Johan Gomér (SWE), Martin Gomér (SWE)
25 June 2022; 15:50	(26–14, 21–27, 10–8); Report			Center court Referees: Johan Gomér (SWE), Martin Gomér (SWE)

25 June 2022; 18:20	United States	0–2	Portugal	Court 2 Referees: Luciano Cardone (ITA), Sebatiano Manuele (ITA)
25 June 2022; 18:20	(20–22, 18–26); Report			Court 2 Referees: Luciano Cardone (ITA), Sebatiano Manuele (ITA)

=== 5–8th place semifinals ===
25 June 2022; 17:30	Norway	1–2	Qatar	Court 2 Referees: Sydiney Dos Santos (BRA), Flavio Asis (BRA)
25 June 2022; 17:30	(24–27, 22–20, 4–7); Report			Court 2 Referees: Sydiney Dos Santos (BRA), Flavio Asis (BRA)

25 June 2022; 17:30	Spain	0–2	Uruguay	Center court Referees: Dario Rupčić (CRO), Ivica Botinčan (CRO)
25 June 2022; 17:30	(20–22, 26–27); Report			Center court Referees: Dario Rupčić (CRO), Ivica Botinčan (CRO)

=== Semifinals ===
25 June 2022; 18:20	Brazil	1–2	Denmark	Center court Referees: Sylwia Bartkowiak (POL), Weronika Łakomy (POL)
25 June 2022; 18:20	(21–16, 16–17, 4–6); Report			Center court Referees: Sylwia Bartkowiak (POL), Weronika Łakomy (POL)

25 June 2022; 20:50	Croatia	2–1	Greece	Center court Referees: Khalid Al-Hail (QAT), Ali Al-Yafei (QAT)
25 June 2022; 20:50	(20–22, 25–18, 5–0); Report			Center court Referees: Khalid Al-Hail (QAT), Ali Al-Yafei (QAT)

=== 15th place game ===
26 June 2022; 09:30	Puerto Rico	0–2	Egypt	Court 3 Referees: Sydiney Dos Santos (BRA), Flavio Asis (BRA)
26 June 2022; 09:30	(20–26, 20–26); Report			Court 3 Referees: Sydiney Dos Santos (BRA), Flavio Asis (BRA)

=== 13th place game ===
26 June 2022; 11:10	Ecuador	2–1	New Zealand	Court 3 Referees: Sylwia Bartkowiak (POL), Weronika Łakomy (POL)
26 June 2022; 11:10	(22–14, 22–24, 8–2); Report			Court 3 Referees: Sylwia Bartkowiak (POL), Weronika Łakomy (POL)

=== Eleventh place game ===
26 June 2022; 09:30	Argentina	2–0	United States	Court 2 Referees: Dario Rupčić (CRO), Ivica Botinčan (CRO)
26 June 2022; 09:30	(23–20, 27–20); Report			Court 2 Referees: Dario Rupčić (CRO), Ivica Botinčan (CRO)

=== Ninth place game ===
26 June 2022; 11:10	Iran	2–0	Portugal	Court 2 Referees: Pedro Ortega (VEN), Miguel Aular (VEN)
26 June 2022; 11:10	(20–18, 29–28); Report			Court 2 Referees: Pedro Ortega (VEN), Miguel Aular (VEN)

=== Seventh place game ===
26 June 2022; 09:30	Norway	0–2	Spain	Center court Referees: Johan Gomér (SWE), Martin Gomér (SWE)
26 June 2022; 09:30	(22–24, 20–21); Report			Center court Referees: Johan Gomér (SWE), Martin Gomér (SWE)

=== Fifth place game ===
26 June 2022; 11:10	Qatar	2–0	Uruguay	Center court Referees: Mathieu Fanack (FRA), Cédric Daré (FRA)
26 June 2022; 11:10	(19–18, 18–16); Report			Center court Referees: Mathieu Fanack (FRA), Cédric Daré (FRA)

=== Third place game ===
26 June 2022; 17:00	Greece	0–2	Brazil	Center court Referees: Luciano Cardone (ITA), Sebatiano Manuele (ITA)
26 June 2022; 17:00	(15–18, 18–24); Report			Center court Referees: Luciano Cardone (ITA), Sebatiano Manuele (ITA)

=== Final ===
26 June 2022; 19:00	Croatia	2–0	Denmark	Center court Referees: Johan Gomér (SWE), Martin Gomér (SWE)
26 June 2022; 19:00	(24–22, 21–18); Report			Center court Referees: Johan Gomér (SWE), Martin Gomér (SWE)

== Final ranking ==
Rank	Team
1st place, gold medalist(s)	Croatia
2nd place, silver medalist(s)	Denmark
3rd place, bronze medalist(s)	Brazil
4	Greece
5	Qatar
6	Uruguay
7	Spain
8	Norway
9	Iran
10	Portugal
11	Argentina
12	United States
13	Ecuador
14	New Zealand
15	Egypt
16	Puerto Rico

== Statistics and awards ==
=== Top goalscorers ===
Rank	Name	Points
1	(Croatia) Lucian Bura	164
2	(Portugal) Diogo Oliveira	149
3	(Qatar) Amir Nowraddine	147
4	(New Zealand) Paul Ireland	135
4	(Uruguay) Santiago Rodríguez	135
6	(Brazil) Gil Pires	126
7	(Argentina) Jorge Pérez	114
8	(Greece) Georgios Eleftheriadis	113
9	(Norway) Kristoffer Henriksen	111
10	(Ecuador) Eduardo Quiñónez	110
10	(United States) Cody Dominik	110

Source: IHF

=== Top goalkeepers ===
Rank	Name	%	Saves	Shots
1	(Egypt) Paula Soliman	33	28	85
2	(Brazil) Cristiano Seben	32	68	212
3	(Denmark) Simon Jensen	29	66	231
4	(Greece) Konstantinos Gourgoumis	28	45	153
5	(Greece) Eleftherios Papazoglou	26	35	135
5	(Spain) Carlos Donderis	26	55	209
7	(Argentina) Lautaro Fernández	25	21	85
7	(Croatia) Dominik Marković	25	56	226
7	(Qatar) Mohsen Mohammed	25	47	187
10	(Iran) Javad Sadeghi	24	52	214

Source: IHF

=== Awards ===
The awards were announced on 26 June 2022.

Position	Player
Goalkeeper	(Denmark) Simon Jensen
Right wing	(Croatia) Lucian Bura
Left wing	(Greece) Georgios Elefthriadis
Specialist	(Denmark) Martin Andersen
Pivot	(Brazil) Gil Pires
Defender	(Denmark) Jeppe Villumsen
MVP	(Croatia) Lucian Bura
Fair play award	Norway
