= IHF Youth Beach Handball World Championship =

International beach handball competition

IHF Youth (U-17) Beach Handball World Championship
- Current season, competition or edition: 2025 Youth Beach Handball World Championship
- Sport: Beach Handball
- Founder: International Handball Federation
- No. of teams: 16
- Confederation: 5
- Most recent champions: Men: Spain; Women: Spain
- Most titles: Men: Spain (2 titles); Women: Spain (2 titles)

The IHF Youth Beach Handball World Championship is an international beach handball competition contested by the men's and women's youth national teams of the member federations of International Handball Federation, the sport's global governing body.

The tournament was established in 2017, taking place every two year. The current tournament format lasts over approximately 6 days and involves 16 men's and 16 women's teams initially competing in four groups of four teams. Three teams from each group will advance to main round and then semifinals are played. The losing semi-finalists play each other in a play-off match to determine the third and fourth-placed teams.

The most recent edition was held in Hammamet, Tunisia and crowned Spain as champions both in men's and women's categories, beating Germany's teams by 2–0.

== Men ==
=== Summary ===
Year	Host	Gold medal match			Bronze medal match
Year	Host	Gold Medalists	Score	Silver Medalists	Bronze Medalists	Score	4th place
2017; Details	(Mauritius); Flic-en-Flac	Spain	2–1	Italy	Argentina	2–1	Russia
2022; Details	(Greece); Heraklion	Croatia	2–1	Brazil	Iran	2–0	France
2025; Details	(Tunisia); Hammamet	Spain	2–0	Germany	Brazil	2–1	Hungary

=== Men's medal table ===
Rank	Nation	Gold	Silver	Bronze	Total
1	Spain	2	0	0	2
2	Croatia	1	0	0	1
3	Brazil	0	1	1	2
4	Germany	0	1	0	1
4	Italy	0	1	0	1
6	Argentina	0	0	1	1
6	Iran	0	0	1	1
Totals (7 entries)		3	3	3	9

=== Men's participating nations ===
Legend

- 1st – Champions
- 2nd – Runners-up
- 3rd – Third place
- × — Withdrew from the World Championship
- — Hosts

Nation	(Mauritius) 2017	(Greece) 2022	(Tunisia) 2025	Years
Argentina	3rd	5th	7th	3
Australia	10th	x	x	1
Brazil	×	2nd	3rd	2
Chinese Taipei	6th	x	x	1
Cook Islands	x	x	15th	1
Croatia	x	1st	10th	2
Czech Republic	x	11th	x	1
France	x	4th	x	1
Germany	x	8th	2nd	2
Greece	x	13th	x	1
Hungary	x	x	4th	1
Iran	x	3rd	16th	2
Italy	2nd	x	x	1
Jordan	x	12th	x	1
Kenya	x	x	14th	1
Mauritius	12th	x	x	1
Mexico	x	x	13th	1
New Zealand	13th	x	x	1
Oman	x	x	8th	1
Pakistan	9th	x	x	1
Paraguay	11th	x	x	1
Portugal	7th	x	x	1
Puerto Rico	x	x	11th	1
Qatar	x	10th	x	1
Russia	4th	x	x	1
South Africa	15th	x	x	1
Senegal	x	x	12th	1
Spain	1st	7th	1st	3
Sweden	x	9th	x	1
Thailand	8th	x	6th	2
Togo	14th	15th	x	2
Tunisia	x	x	5th	1
Ukraine	x	6th	x	1
United States	x	16th	x	1
Uruguay	x	14th	9th	2
Venezuela	5th	x	x	1
Total	15	16	16	

== Women ==
=== Summary ===
Year	Host	Gold medal match			Bronze medal match
Year	Host	Gold Medalists	Score	Silver Medalists	Bronze Medalists	Score	4th place
2017; Details	(Mauritius); Flic-en-Flac	Hungary	2–1	Netherlands	Argentina	2–1	Portugal
2022; Details	(Greece); Heraklion	Spain	2–1	Netherlands	Poland	2–1	Hungary
2025; Details	(Tunisia); Hammamet	Spain	2–0	Germany	Netherlands	2–0	Hungary

=== Women's medal table ===
Rank	Nation	Gold	Silver	Bronze	Total
1	Spain	2	0	0	2
2	Hungary	1	0	0	1
3	Netherlands	0	2	1	3
4	Germany	0	1	0	1
5	Argentina	0	0	1	1
5	Poland	0	0	1	1
Totals (6 entries)		3	3	3	9

=== Women's participating nations ===
Legend

- 1st – Champions
- 2nd – Runners-up
- 3rd – Third place
- × — Withdrew from the World Championship
- — Hosts

Nation	(Mauritius) 2017	(Greece) 2022	(Tunisia) 2025	Years
American Samoa	12th	x	x	1
Argentina	3rd	5th	x	1
Australia	13th	x	x	1
Brazil	×	8th	8th	2
Bulgaria	x	x	13th	1
China	7th	x	9th	2
Chinese Taipei	8th	x	x	1
Croatia	9th	x	7th	2
France	x	6th	6th	2
Germany	x	7th	2nd	2
Greece	x	12th	x	1
Hong Kong	x	16th	x	1
Hungary	1st	4th	4th	3
India	x	14th	x	1
Kenya	x	x	12th	1
Mauritius	14th	x	x	1
Mexico	x	x	15th	1
Netherlands	2nd	2nd	3rd	3
Paraguay	11th	x	x	1
Poland	x	3rd	x	1
Portugal	4th	x	x	1
Puerto Rico	x	15th	x	1
Romania	x	9th	x	1
Senegal	x	x	14th	1
Spain	5th	1st	1st	3
Tanzania	x	x	16th	1
Thailand	6th	11th	11th	3
Tunisia	x	x	10th	1
Ukraine	×	10th	x	1
Uruguay	×	13th	5th	2
Venezuela	10th	x	x	1
Total	14	16	16	

== See also ==
- Beach handball at the World Games
- Beach Handball World Championships
- Asian Youth Beach Handball Championship
- Pan American Youth Beach Handball Championship
