= 2022 Youth Beach Handball World Championship =

2nd IHF Men's & Women's Youth (U18) Beach Handball World Championship 2022
Tournament details
- Host country: Greece
- Venue: Karteros Beach Sports Center (in Heraklion host cities)
- Dates: 14–19 June 2022
- Teams: 32 (from 6 confederations)

Final positions
- Champions: Men: Croatia (1st title); Women: Spain (1st title)
- Runners-up: Men: Brazil; Women: Netherlands
- Third place: Men: Iran; Women: Poland
- Fourth place: Men: France; Women: Hungary

The 2022 IHF Youth Beach Handball World Championship was the 2nd edition of the championship. The event was held in Heraklion, Greece from 14 to 19 June 2022, under the aegis of the International Handball Federation (IHF).

Previously the championship was scheduled to be held in Nazaré, Portugal in July 2021. But on 19 February 2021, the IHF Council decided to move and postpone the event to 2022 due to the COVID-19 pandemic.

== Bidding process ==
Only Greece entered bid for hosting the tournament. The event was awarded by the IHF Council during its meeting held on 4 November 2021.

== Men's event ==
=== Group A ===
| Team | Pld | W | L | SW | SL | Diff. | Pts | Qualification |
|---|---|---|---|---|---|---|---|---|
| Sweden | 3 | 3 | 0 | 6 | 0 | +6 | 6 | Main round |
| Iran | 3 | 2 | 1 | 4 | 2 | +2 | 4 | Main round |
| Qatar | 3 | 1 | 2 | 2 | 4 | -2 | 2 | Main round |
| United States | 3 | 0 | 3 | 0 | 6 | -6 | 0 | Consolation group |

| Team 1 | Score | Team 2 |
14 June 2022
10:10
| Sweden | 2–0 | Qatar |
| Iran | 2–0 | United States |
15:40
| Sweden | 2–0 | United States |
| Iran | 2–0 | Qatar |
15 June 2022
14:00
| Sweden | 2–0 | Iran |
| Qatar | 2–0 | United States |

=== Group B ===
| Team | Pld | W | L | SW | SL | Diff. | Pts | Qualification |
|---|---|---|---|---|---|---|---|---|
| France | 3 | 3 | 0 | 6 | 1 | +5 | 6 | Main round |
| Croatia | 3 | 2 | 1 | 4 | 2 | +2 | 4 | Main round |
| Brazil | 3 | 1 | 2 | 3 | 4 | -1 | 2 | Main round |
| Togo | 3 | 0 | 3 | 0 | 6 | -6 | 0 | Consolation group |

| Team 1 | Score | Team 2 |
14 June 2022
11:50
| France | 2–0 | Croatia |
17:20
| Croatia | 2–0 | Togo |
17:35
| France | 2–1 | Brazil |
15 June 2022
10:20
| Croatia | 2–0 | Brazil |
| France | 2–0 | Togo |
17:20
| Brazil | 2–0 | Togo |

=== Group C ===
| Team | Pld | W | L | SW | SL | Diff. | Pts | Qualification |
|---|---|---|---|---|---|---|---|---|
| Spain | 3 | 2 | 1 | 5 | 2 | +3 | 4 | Main round |
| Jordan | 3 | 2 | 1 | 4 | 4 | 0 | 4 | Main round |
| Greece | 3 | 1 | 2 | 3 | 4 | -1 | 2 | Main round |
| Czech Republic | 3 | 1 | 2 | 3 | 5 | -2 | 2 | Consolation group |

| Team 1 | Score | Team 2 |
14 June 2022
11:50
| Greece | 2–1 | Czech Republic |
14:00
| Jordan | 2–1 | Spain |
19:10
| Jordan | 2–1 | Greece |
20:00
| Spain | 2–0 | Czech Republic |
15 June 2022
16:30
| Spain | 2–0 | Greece |
| Czech Republic | 2–0 | Jordan |

=== Group D ===
| Team | Pld | W | L | SW | SL | Diff. | Pts | Qualification |
|---|---|---|---|---|---|---|---|---|
| Germany | 3 | 3 | 0 | 6 | 0 | +6 | 6 | Main round |
| Argentina | 3 | 2 | 1 | 4 | 3 | +1 | 4 | Main round |
| Ukraine | 3 | 1 | 2 | 3 | 5 | -2 | 2 | Main round |
| Uruguay | 3 | 0 | 3 | 1 | 5 | -4 | 2 | Consolation group |

| Team 1 | Score | Team 2 |
14 June 2022
10:10
| Argentina | 2–0 | Uruguay |
11:00
| Germany | 2–0 | Ukraine |
16:30
| Germany | 2–0 | Argentina |
| Ukraine | 2–1 | Uruguay |
15 June 2022
15:40
| Germany | 2–0 | Uruguay |
| Argentina | 2–1 | Ukraine |

=== Group I ===
| Team | Pld | W | L | SW | SL | Diff. | Pts | Qualification |
|---|---|---|---|---|---|---|---|---|
| Croatia | 5 | 4 | 1 | 8 | 4 | +4 | 8 | Quarterfinals |
| Iran | 5 | 3 | 2 | 7 | 4 | +3 | 6 | Quarterfinals |
| France | 5 | 3 | 2 | 6 | 6 | 0 | 6 | Quarterfinals |
| Brazil | 5 | 2 | 3 | 5 | 7 | -2 | 4 | Quarterfinals |
| Sweden | 5 | 2 | 3 | 6 | 6 | 0 | 4 | 9th - 15th place |
| Qatar | 5 | 1 | 4 | 3 | 8 | -6 | 2 | 9th - 15th place |

| Team 1 | Score | Team 2 |
16 June 2022
09:20
| Brazil | 2–1 | Sweden |
| Qatar | 2–0 | France |
| Croatia | 2–1 | Iran |
15:50
| Croatia | 2–0 | Sweden |
| Iran | 2–0 | France |
| Brazil | 2–0 | Qatar |
17 June 2022
15:50
| France | 2–1 | Sweden |
| Iran | 2–0 | Brazil |
| Croatia | 2–1 | Qatar |

=== Group II ===
| Team | Pld | W | L | SW | SL | Diff. | Pts | Qualification |
|---|---|---|---|---|---|---|---|---|
| Spain | 5 | 4 | 1 | 9 | 4 | +5 | 8 | Quarterfinals |
| Germany | 5 | 4 | 1 | 9 | 4 | +5 | 8 | Quarterfinals |
| Argentina | 5 | 3 | 2 | 4 | 7 | _3 | 6 | Quarterfinals |
| Ukraine | 5 | 2 | 3 | 6 | 6 | 0 | 4 | Quarterfinals |
| Jordan | 5 | 2 | 3 | 4 | 7 | _3 | 4 | 9th - 15th place |
| Greece | 5 | 0 | 5 | 2 | 10 | -8 | 0 | 9th - 15th place |

| Team 1 | Score | Team 2 |
16 June 2022
11:00
| Germany | 2–1 | Greece |
| Spain | 2–0 | Argentina |
| Ukraine | 2–0 | Jordan |
17:30
| Ukraine | 2–0 | Greece |
| Spain | 2–1 | Germany |
19:10
| Argentina | 2–0 | Jordan |
17 June 2022
11:00
| Spain | 2–1 | Ukraine |
16:40
| Germany | 2–1 | Jordan |
| Argentina | 2–0 | Greece |

=== Consolation Group ===
| Team | Pld | W | L | SW | SL | Diff. | Pts | Qualification |
|---|---|---|---|---|---|---|---|---|
| Czech Republic | 3 | 3 | 0 | 6 | 0 | +6 | 6 | 9th - 15th place |
| Uruguay | 3 | 2 | 1 | 4 | 2 | +2 | 4 | 9th - 15th place |
| United States | 3 | 1 | 2 | 2 | 4 | -2 | 2 | 9th - 15th place |
| Togo | 3 | 0 | 3 | 0 | 6 | -6 | 0 | 9th - 15th place |

| Team 1 | Score | Team 2 |
16 June 2022
08:30
| Uruguay | 2–0 | Togo |
| Czech Republic | 2–0 | United States |
15:00
| Uruguay | 2–0 | United States |
| Czech Republic | 2–0 | Togo |
17 June 2022
08:30
| United States | 2–0 | Togo |
09:20
| Czech Republic | 2–0 | Uruguay |

=== Championship bracket ===
Fifth place match
Ukraine | 0
Argentina | 2
Seventh place match
Germany | 1
Spain | 2

5–8th place semifinals
Ukraine | 2
Germany | 0
Spain | 1
Argentina | 2

Quarterfinals
Croatia | 2
Ukraine | 0
France | 2
Germany | 1
Brazil | 2
Spain | 0
Iran | 2
Argentina | 1

Semifinals
Croatia | 2
France | 1
Brazil | 2
Iran | 1

Final
Croatia | 2
Brazil | 1
Third place match
France | 0
Iran | 2

=== Placement bracket ===
13th place match
Greece | 2
Uruguay | 0
15th place match
Togo | 2
United States | 1

13–16th place bracket
Togo | 0
Greece | 2
United States | 0
Uruguay | 2

9–16th place bracket
Sweden | 2
Togo | 0
Greece | 0
Czech Republic | 2
Qatar | 2
Uruguay | 1
Jordan | 2
United States | 0

9–12th place bracket
Sweden | 2
Czech Republic | 0
Jordan | 1
Qatar | 2

ninth place match
Sweden | 2
Qatar | 0
11th place match
Czech Republic | 2
Jordan | 0

== Final ranking ==
| Rank | Team |
|---|---|
| 1st place, gold medalist(s) | Croatia |
| 2nd place, silver medalist(s) | Brazil |
| 3rd place, bronze medalist(s) | Iran |
| 4 | France |
| 5 | Argentina |
| 6 | Ukraine |
| 7 | Spain |
| 8 | Germany |
| 9 | Sweden |
| 10 | Qatar |
| 11 | Czech Republic |
| 12 | Jordan |
| 13 | Greece |
| 14 | Uruguay |
| 15 | Togo |
| 16 | United States |

== Women's event ==
=== Group A ===
| Team | Pld | W | L | SW | SL | Diff. | Pts | Qualification |
|---|---|---|---|---|---|---|---|---|
| Hungary | 3 | 3 | 0 | 6 | 0 | +6 | 6 | Main round |
| Poland | 3 | 2 | 1 | 4 | 2 | +2 | 4 | Main round |
| Thailand | 3 | 1 | 2 | 2 | 5 | -3 | 2 | Main round |
| Uruguay | 3 | 0 | 3 | 1 | 6 | -5 | 0 | Consolation group |

| Team 1 | Score | Team 2 |
14 June 2022
09:30
| Hungary | 2–0 | Poland |
| Thailand | 2–1 | Uruguay |
15:00
| Uruguay | 0–2 | Hungary |
| Poland | 2–0 | Thailand |
15 June 2022
10:30
| Hungary | 2–0 | Thailand |
| Poland | 2–0 | Uruguay |

=== Group B ===
| Team | Pld | W | L | SW | SL | Diff. | Pts | Qualification |
|---|---|---|---|---|---|---|---|---|
| Spain | 3 | 3 | 0 | 6 | 0 | +6 | 6 | Main round |
| Brazil | 3 | 2 | 1 | 4 | 3 | +1 | 4 | Main round |
| Ukraine | 3 | 1 | 2 | 3 | 4 | -1 | 2 | Main round |
| India | 3 | 0 | 3 | 0 | 6 | -6 | 0 | Consolation group |

| Team 1 | Score | Team 2 |
14 June 2022
15:50
| Ukraine | 0–2 | Spain |
15 June 2022
09:40
| Spain | 2–0 | Brazil |
| India | 0–2 | Ukraine |
13:00
| Brazil | 2–0 | India |
18:20
| Brazil | 2–1 | Ukraine |
| Spain | 2–0 | India |

=== Group C ===
| Team | Pld | W | L | SW | SL | Diff. | Pts | Qualification |
|---|---|---|---|---|---|---|---|---|
| Argentina | 3 | 3 | 0 | 6 | 3 | +3 | 8 | Main round |
| Germany | 3 | 2 | 1 | 5 | 2 | +3 | 4 | Main round |
| France | 3 | 1 | 2 | 3 | 5 | -2 | 2 | Main round |
| Romania | 3 | 0 | 3 | 2 | 6 | -4 | 0 | Consolation group |

| Team 1 | Score | Team 2 |
14 June 2022
09:30
| Germany | 2–0 | Romania |
10:20
| Argentina | 2–1 | France |
15:50
| France | 0–2 | Germany |
| Romania | 1–2 | Argentina |
15 June 2022
15:50
| Argentina | 2–1 | Germany |
| France | 2–1 | Romania |

=== Group D ===
| Team | Pld | W | L | SW | SL | Diff. | Pts | Qualification |
|---|---|---|---|---|---|---|---|---|
| Netherlands | 3 | 3 | 0 | 6 | 0 | +6 | 6 | Main round |
| Greece | 3 | 2 | 1 | 4 | 2 | +2 | 4 | Main round |
| Puerto Rico | 3 | 1 | 2 | 2 | 5 | -3 | 2 | Main round |
| Hong Kong | 3 | 0 | 3 | 1 | 6 | -5 | 0 | Consolation group |

| Team 1 | Score | Team 2 |
14 June 2022
12:00
| Greece | 2–0 | Puerto Rico |
| Netherlands | 2–0 | Hong Kong |
17:30
| Puerto Rico | 0–2 | Netherlands |
18:20
| Hong Kong | 0–2 | Greece |
15 June 2022
12:10
| Netherlands | 2–0 | Greece |
| Hong Kong | 1–2 | Puerto Rico |

=== Group I ===
| Team | Pld | W | L | SW | SL | Diff. | Pts | Qualification |
|---|---|---|---|---|---|---|---|---|
| Hungary | 5 | 5 | 0 | 10 | 2 | +8 | 10 | Quarterfinals |
| Spain | 5 | 4 | 1 | 9 | 2 | +7 | 8 | Quarterfinals |
| Brazil | 5 | 3 | 2 | 7 | 6 | 1 | 6 | Quarterfinals |
| Poland | 5 | 2 | 3 | 5 | 7 | -2 | 4 | Quarterfinals |
| Thailand | 5 | 1 | 4 | 2 | 9 | -7 | 2 | 9th - 15th place |
| Ukraine | 5 | 0 | 5 | 3 | 10 | -7 | 0 | 9th - 15th place |

| Team 1 | Score | Team 2 |
16 June 2022
11:10
| Poland | 1–2 | Brazil |
| Hungary | 2–0 | Ukraine |
| Thailand | 0–2 | Spain |
17:40
| Hungary | 2–1 | Brazil |
| Poland | 0–2 | Spain |
| Thailand | 2–1 | Ukraine |
17 June 2022
13:00
| Hungary | 2–1 | Spain |
| Thailand | 0–2 | Brazil |
| Poland | 2–1 | Ukraine |

=== Group II ===
| Team | Pld | W | L | SW | SL | Diff. | Pts | Qualification |
|---|---|---|---|---|---|---|---|---|
| Germany | 5 | 4 | 1 | 9 | 2 | +7 | 8 | Quarterfinals |
| Netherlands | 5 | 4 | 1 | 8 | 2 | +6 | 8 | Quarterfinals |
| Argentina | 5 | 4 | 1 | 8 | 4 | +4 | 6 | Quarterfinals |
| France | 5 | 2 | 3 | 5 | 6 | -1 | 4 | Quarterfinals |
| Greece | 5 | 1 | 4 | 2 | 8 | -6 | 2 | 9th - 15th place |
| Puerto Rico | 5 | 0 | 5 | 0 | 10 | -10 | 0 | 9th - 15th place |

| Team 1 | Score | Team 2 |
16 June 2022
12:50
| Argentina | 2–0 | Puerto Rico |
| France | 0–2 | Netherlands |
| Germany | 2–0 | Greece |
19:20
| Germany | 2–0 | Netherlands |
| France | 2–0 | Puerto Rico |
21:00
| Argentina | 2–0 | Greece |
17 June 2022
18:30
| Germany | 2–0 | Puerto Rico |
| Argentina | 0–2 | Netherlands |
| France | 2–0 | Greece |

=== Consolation Group ===
| Team | Pld | W | L | SW | SL | Diff. | Pts | Qualification |
|---|---|---|---|---|---|---|---|---|
| Romania | 3 | 3 | 0 | 6 | 1 | +5 | 6 | 9th - 15th place |
| Uruguay | 3 | 2 | 1 | 5 | 2 | +3 | 4 | 9th - 15th place |
| Hong Kong | 3 | 1 | 2 | 2 | 4 | -2 | 2 | 9th - 15th place |
| India | 3 | 0 | 3 | 0 | 6 | -6 | 0 | 9th - 15th place |

| Team 1 | Score | Team 2 |
16 June 2022
09:30
| Uruguay | 1–2 | Romania |
15:10
| India | 0–2 | Hong Kong |
18:30
| Hong Kong | 0–2 | Uruguay |
19:20
| Romania | 2–0 | India |
17 June 2022
11:10
| Uruguay | 2–0 | India |
12:00
| Romania | 2–0 | Hong Kong |

=== Championship bracket ===
Fifth place match
France | 1
Argentina | 2
Seventh place match
Brazil | 1
Germany | 2

5–8th place semifinals
France | 2
Brazil | 1
Germany | 1
Argentina | 2

Quarterfinals
Hungary | 2
France | 0
Brazil | 0
Netherlands | 2
Poland | 2
Germany | 1
Spain | 2
Argentina | 0

Semifinals
Hungary | 0
Netherlands | 2
Poland | 1
Spain | 2

Final
Netherlands | 1
Spain | 2
Third place match
Hungary | 1
Poland | 2

=== Placement bracket ===
13th place match
India | 0
Uruguay | 2
15th place match
Puerto Rico | 2
Hong Kong | 1

13–16th place bracket
India | 2
Puerto Rico | 0
Uruguay | 2
Hong Kong | 0

9–16th place bracket
Greece | 2
India | 1
Puerto Rico | 0
Romania | 2
Ukraine | 2
Uruguay | 1
Thailand | 2
Hong Kong | 0

9–12th place bracket
Greece | 0
Romania | 2
Ukraine | 2
Thailand | 0

ninth place match
Romania | 2
Ukraine | 1
11th place match
Greece | 1
Thailand | 2

== Final ranking ==
| Rank | Team |
|---|---|
| 1st place, gold medalist(s) | Spain |
| 2nd place, silver medalist(s) | Netherlands |
| 3rd place, bronze medalist(s) | Poland |
| 4 | Hungary |
| 5 | Argentina |
| 6 | France |
| 7 | Germany |
| 8 | Brazil |
| 9 | Romania |
| 10 | Ukraine |
| 11 | Thailand |
| 12 | Greece |
| 13 | Uruguay |
| 14 | India |
| 15 | Puerto Rico |
| 16 | Hong Kong |
