= Cook Islands women's national beach handball team =

Cook Islands

Information
- Association: Cook Islands Handball Association
- Coach: Paul-Luiz van Eijk
- Assistant coach: Peter John

Colours
Home	Away

Results

World Championship
- Appearances: 1 (First in 2026)
- Best result: 15th (2026)
- Last updated on Unknown.

The Cook Islands women's national beach handball team is the national team of the Cook Islands. It is governed by the Cook Islands Handball Association and takes part in international beach handball competitions.

== World Championship results ==
Year	Position
(Egypt) 2004	Did not qualify
(Brazil) 2006	Did not qualify
(Spain) 2008	Did not qualify
(Turkey) 2010	Did not qualify
(Oman) 2012	Did not qualify
(Brazil) 2014	Did not qualify
(Hungary) 2016	Did not qualify
(Russia) 2018	Did not qualify
(Italy) 2020	Did not qualify
(Greece) 2022	Did not qualify
(China) 2024	Did not qualify
(Croatia) 2026	15th place
Total	1/11
