= Benin women's national beach handball team =

Benin

Information
- Association: Fédération Béninoise de Handball

Colours
Home	Away
- Last updated on Unknown.

The Benin women's national beach handball team is the national team of Benin. It is governed by the Fédération Béninoise de Handball and takes part in international beach handball competitions.

== World Championship results ==
Year	Position
(Egypt) 2004	Did not qualify
(Brazil) 2006	Did not qualify
(Spain) 2008	Did not qualify
(Turkey) 2010	Did not qualify
(Oman) 2012	Did not qualify
(Brazil) 2014	Did not qualify
(Hungary) 2016	Did not qualify
(Russia) 2018	Did not qualify
(Italy) 2020	Did not qualify
(Greece) 2022	Did not qualify
(China) 2024	Did not qualify
(Croatia) 2026	Withdrawn due to visa issues
Total	0/11
