= European Women's Beach Handball Championship =

International beach handball competition

- Status: active
- Genre: sports event
- Date: midyear
- Frequency: biennial
- Inaugurated: 2000
- Organiser: European Handball Federation

The European Women's Beach Handball Championship is the official competition for women's senior national beach handball teams of Europe. It was first organized by the EHF in 2000. In addition to crowning the European champions, the tournament also serves as a qualifying tournament for the World Championships.

== Summary ==
Year	Host	Final			Bronze Match		
Year	Host	Gold	Score	Silver	Bronze	Score	Fourth Place
2000; Details	Gaeta, Italy	Ukraine	2–1	Germany	Russia	2–1	FR Yugoslavia
2002; Details	Cádiz, Spain	Russia	2–1	Turkey	FR Yugoslavia	2–0	Germany
2004; Details	Alanya, Turkey	Russia	2–0	Croatia	Germany	2–0	Italy
2006; Details	Cuxhaven, Germany	Germany	2–0	Russia	Croatia	2–0	Turkey
2007; Details	Misano Adriatico, Italy	Croatia	2–1	Germany	Norway	2–0	Russia
2009; Details	Larvik, Norway	Italy	2–1	Norway	Croatia	2–0	Ukraine
2011; Details	Umag, Croatia	Croatia	2–1	Denmark	Italy	2–1	Norway
2013; Details	Randers, Denmark	Hungary	2–1	Denmark	Norway	2–1	Ukraine
2015; Details	Lloret de Mar, Spain	Hungary	2–1	Norway	Italy	2–1	Spain
2017; Details	Zagreb, Croatia	Norway	2–0	Poland	Spain	2–1	Denmark
2019; Details	Stare Jablonki, Poland	Denmark	2–0	Hungary	Netherlands	2–0	Croatia
2021; Details	Varna, Bulgaria	Germany	2–0	Denmark	Spain	2–0	Norway
2023; Details	Nazaré, Portugal	Germany	2–1	Netherlands	Spain	2–1	Portugal
2025; Details	Alanya, Turkey	Spain	2–1	Norway	Germany	2–1	Netherlands

=== Medal table ===
Rank	Nation	Gold	Silver	Bronze	Total
1	Germany	3	2	2	7
2	Croatia	2	1	2	5
3	Russia	2	1	1	4
4	Hungary	2	1	0	3
5	Norway	1	3	2	6
6	Denmark	1	3	0	4
7	Spain	1	0	3	4
8	Italy	1	0	2	3
9	Ukraine	1	0	0	1
10	Netherlands	0	1	1	2
11	Poland	0	1	0	1
11	Turkey	0	1	0	1
13	FR Yugoslavia	0	0	1	1
Totals (13 entries)		14	14	14	42

== See also ==
- World Women's Beach Handball Championship
- European Men's Beach Handball Championship
- European Beach Handball Tour
