= 2020 Women's Beach Handball World Championships =

2020 IHF Women's Beach Handball World Championship
Tournament details
- Venue(s): 1 (in 1 host city)
- Teams: 16 (from 5 confederations)

The 2020 Women's IHF Beach Handball World Championships would have been the ninth edition of the tournament. Originally scheduled for 30 June to 5 July 2020 in Pescara, Italy, the tournament was planned to be rescheduled and moved to another host country, due to the COVID-19 pandemic.

On 22 February 2021, the tournament was cancelled.

== Qualification ==
Qualification	Vacancies	Qualified
Host	1	Italy
Defending champion	1	Greece
2019 African Beach Games	1	Tunisia
2019 Asian Beach Handball Championship	2	China; Vietnam
2019 European Beach Handball Championship	5	Croatia; Denmark; Hungary; Netherlands; Spain
2019 Oceania Beach Handball Championship	1	Australia
2019 South and Central American Beach Handball Championship	2	Argentina; Brazil
2019 Nor.ca Beach Handball Championship	2	Mexico; United States
Wildcard	1	Norway
