= 2026 Women's Beach Handball World Championships =

Tournament details
- Host country: Croatia
- Venue: Zagreb
- Dates: 23–28 June
- Teams: 16 (from 6 confederations)

Final positions
- Champions: Argentina (1st title)
- Runners-up: Denmark
- Third place: Spain
- Fourth place: Brazil

Tournament statistics
- Top scorers: (Brazil) Beatriz Correia (132 points)

The 2026 Women's Beach Handball World Championships was the 11th edition of the championship, held in Zagreb, Croatia from 23 to 28 June 2026, under the aegis of International Handball Federation (IHF).

Argentina won their first tile with a win over Denmark.

== Qualification ==
16 teams participated.

Qualification	Vacancies	Qualified
Host	1	Croatia
Defending champion	1	Germany
2025 Asian Beach Handball Championship	2	Vietnam; Philippines
2025 European Beach Handball Championship	5	Spain; Norway; Netherlands; Denmark; Greece
2025 Oceania Beach Handball Championship	1	Cook Islands
2026 South and Central American Beach Handball Championship	3	Argentina; Brazil; Uruguay
2026 NACHC Beach Handball Championship	2	United States; Puerto Rico
Africa	1	Benin

- Australia withdrew and the Cook Islands were invited.

== Draw ==
The draw took place on 2 May 2026.

=== Seeding ===
Pot 1	Pot 2	Pot 3	Pot 4
Germany; Spain; Argentina; Norway	Netherlands; Croatia; Denmark; Greece	Brazil; Vietnam; Philippines; Cook Islands	United States; Puerto Rico; Uruguay; Benin

== Preliminary round ==
All times are local (UTC+2).

=== Group A ===
Pos	Team	Pld	W	L	Pts	SW	SL	SR	SPW	SPL	SPR	Qualification
1	Germany	3	3	0	6	6	2	3.000	143	116	1.233	Main round
2	Netherlands	3	2	1	4	4	3	1.333	126	122	1.033	Main round
3	Uruguay	3	1	2	2	3	5	0.600	110	113	0.973	Main round
4	Vietnam	3	0	3	0	3	6	0.500	125	153	0.817	Consolation round

Source: IHF
Rules for classification: 1) Points; 2) Head-to-head points; 3) Head-to-head set difference; 4) Head-to-head points won; 5) Set difference; 6) Points won; 7) Draw.

23 June 2026; 12:00	Netherlands	2–0	Uruguay	Court 4 Attendance: 50; Referees: Víctor Rollán (ESP), Sergio Martínez (ESP)
23 June 2026; 12:00	(20–16, 19–16); Report			Court 4 Attendance: 50; Referees: Víctor Rollán (ESP), Sergio Martínez (ESP)

23 June 2026; 12:00	Germany	2–1	Vietnam	Court 2 Attendance: 50; Referees: Dario Rupčić (CRO), Ivica Botincan (CRO)
23 June 2026; 12:00	(22–23, 30–18, 7–4); Report			Court 2 Attendance: 50; Referees: Dario Rupčić (CRO), Ivica Botincan (CRO)

23 June 2026; 20:00	Netherlands	2–1	Vietnam	Court 3 Referees: Corina Radut (ROU), Daniela-Andreea Enache (ROU)
23 June 2026; 20:00	(22–24, 21–20, 9–4); Report			Court 3 Referees: Corina Radut (ROU), Daniela-Andreea Enache (ROU)

23 June 2026; 20:00	Uruguay	1–2	Germany	Court 2 Referees: Bulakorn Kongka (THA), Thiwakorn Sangjun (THA)
23 June 2026; 20:00	(15–18, 17–16, 4–8); Report			Court 2 Referees: Bulakorn Kongka (THA), Thiwakorn Sangjun (THA)

24 June 2026; 10:00	Vietnam	1–2	Uruguay	Court 4 Referees: Bulakorn Kongka (THA), Thiwakorn Sangjun (THA)
24 June 2026; 10:00	(12–18, 15–14, 5–10); Report			Court 4 Referees: Bulakorn Kongka (THA), Thiwakorn Sangjun (THA)

24 June 2026; 10:00	Germany	2–0	Netherlands	Central court Attendance: 67; Referees: Sidiney dos Santos (BRA), Flavio de Moura (BRA)
24 June 2026; 10:00	(23–20, 19–15); Report			Central court Attendance: 67; Referees: Sidiney dos Santos (BRA), Flavio de Moura (BRA)

=== Group B ===
Pos	Team	Pld	W	L	Pts	SW	SL	SR	SPW	SPL	SPR	Qualification
1	Spain	3	3	0	6	6	0	MAX	150	81	1.852	Main round
2	Croatia (H)	3	2	1	4	4	2	2.000	125	94	1.330	Main round
3	Puerto Rico	3	1	2	2	2	4	0.500	95	115	0.826	Main round
4	Cook Islands	3	0	3	0	0	6	0.000	61	141	0.433	Consolation round

Source: IHF
Rules for classification: 1) Points; 2) Head-to-head points; 3) Head-to-head set difference; 4) Head-to-head points won; 5) Set difference; 6) Points won; 7) Draw.
(H) Host

23 June 2026; 12:00	Spain	2–0	Cook Islands	Court 3 Attendance: 150; Referees: José María Galeano (PAR), José María Rodríguez (PAR)
23 June 2026; 12:00	(30–7, 20–6); Report			Court 3 Attendance: 150; Referees: José María Galeano (PAR), José María Rodríguez (PAR)

23 June 2026; 12:00	Croatia	2–0	Puerto Rico	Central court Referees: Sylwia Bartkowiak (POL), Weronika Łakomy (POL)
23 June 2026; 12:00	(17–16, 16–12); Report			Central court Referees: Sylwia Bartkowiak (POL), Weronika Łakomy (POL)

23 June 2026; 20:00	Puerto Rico	0–2	Spain	Court 4 Attendance: 50; Referees: Bjarne Deiters (GER), Jesper Stumpfe (GER)
23 June 2026; 20:00	(10–26, 16–26); Report			Court 4 Attendance: 50; Referees: Bjarne Deiters (GER), Jesper Stumpfe (GER)

23 June 2026; 20:30	Croatia	2–0	Cook Islands	Central court Attendance: 200; Referees: José María Galeano (PAR), José María Rodríguez (PAR)
23 June 2026; 20:30	(26–10, 24–8); Report			Central court Attendance: 200; Referees: José María Galeano (PAR), José María Rodríguez (PAR)

24 June 2026; 12:00	Spain	2–0	Croatia	Central court Referees: José María Galeano (PAR), José María Rodríguez (PAR)
24 June 2026; 12:00	(24–20, 24–22); Report			Central court Referees: José María Galeano (PAR), José María Rodríguez (PAR)

24 June 2026; 12:00	Cook Islands	0–2	Puerto Rico	Court 4 Attendance: 25; Referees: Sidiney dos Santos (BRA), Flavio de Moura (BRA)
24 June 2026; 12:00	(12–15, 18–26); Report			Court 4 Attendance: 25; Referees: Sidiney dos Santos (BRA), Flavio de Moura (BRA)

=== Group C ===
Pos	Team	Pld	W	L	Pts	SW	SL	SR	SPW	SPL	SPR	Qualification
1	Brazil	3	3	0	6	6	1	6.000	145	87	1.667	Main round
2	Greece	3	2	1	4	5	2	2.500	118	107	1.103	Main round
3	Norway	3	1	2	2	2	4	0.500	125	117	1.068	Main round
4	United States	3	0	3	0	0	6	0.000	55	132	0.417	Consolation round

Source: IHF
Rules for classification: 1) Points; 2) Head-to-head points; 3) Head-to-head set difference; 4) Head-to-head points won; 5) Set difference; 6) Points won; 7) Draw.

23 June 2026; 10:00	Norway	0–2	Brazil	Central court Referees: Víctor Rollán (ESP), Sergio Martínez (ESP)
23 June 2026; 10:00	(18–23, 16–27); Report			Central court Referees: Víctor Rollán (ESP), Sergio Martínez (ESP)

23 June 2026; 10:00	Greece	2–0	United States	Court 2 Attendance: 100; Referees: Dario Rupčić (CRO), Ivica Botincan (CRO)
23 June 2026; 10:00	(13–12, 20–8); Report			Court 2 Attendance: 100; Referees: Dario Rupčić (CRO), Ivica Botincan (CRO)

23 June 2026; 18:00	Greece	1–2	Brazil	Court 4 Attendance: 15; Referees: Corina Radut (ROU), Daniela-Andreea Enache (ROU)
23 June 2026; 18:00	(20–16, 12–23, 4–6); Report			Court 4 Attendance: 15; Referees: Corina Radut (ROU), Daniela-Andreea Enache (ROU)

23 June 2026; 18:00	United States	0–2	Norway	Court 2 Attendance: 72; Referees: Bulakorn Kongka (THA), Thiwakorn Sangjun (THA)
23 June 2026; 18:00	(6–24, 12–25); Report			Court 2 Attendance: 72; Referees: Bulakorn Kongka (THA), Thiwakorn Sangjun (THA)

24 June 2026; 10:00	Norway	0–2	Greece	Court 2 Attendance: 50; Referees: José María Galeano (PAR), José María Rodríguez (PAR)
24 June 2026; 10:00	(20–22, 22–27); Report			Court 2 Attendance: 50; Referees: José María Galeano (PAR), José María Rodríguez (PAR)

24 June 2026; 10:00	Brazil	2–0	United States	Court 3 Attendance: 50; Referees: Dario Rupčić (CRO), Ivica Botincan (CRO)
24 June 2026; 10:00	(23–8, 27–9); Report			Court 3 Attendance: 50; Referees: Dario Rupčić (CRO), Ivica Botincan (CRO)

=== Group D ===
Pos	Team	Pld	W	L	Pts	SW	SL	SR	SPW	SPL	SPR	Qualification
1	Denmark	3	3	0	6	6	1	6.000	122	81	1.506	Main round
2	Argentina	3	2	1	4	5	2	2.500	113	81	1.395	Main round
3	Philippines	3	1	2	2	2	4	0.500	68	81	0.840	Main round
4	Benin (Note: Benin withdrew before the tournament due to visa issues.)	3	0	3	0	0	6	0.000	0	60	0.000	Withdrew

Source: IHF
Rules for classification: 1) Points; 2) Head-to-head points; 3) Head-to-head set difference; 4) Head-to-head points won; 5) Set difference; 6) Points won; 7) Draw.
Notes:

23 June 2026; 10:00	Denmark	2–0 (Note: Benin withdrew before the tournament due to visa issues.)	Benin	Court 2
23 June 2026; 10:00	(10–0, 10–0)			Court 2

23 June 2026; 10:00	Argentina	2–0	Philippines	Court 4 Referees: Sylwia Bartkowiak (POL), Weronika Łakomy (POL)
23 June 2026; 10:00	(18–12, 20–10); Report			Court 4 Referees: Sylwia Bartkowiak (POL), Weronika Łakomy (POL)

23 June 2026; 18:00	Philippines	2–0	Benin	Court 3
23 June 2026; 18:00	(10–0, 10–0)			Court 3

23 June 2026; 18:00	Argentina	1–2	Denmark	Central court Referees: Bjarne Deiters (GER), Jesper Stumpfe (GER)
23 June 2026; 18:00	(24–29, 23–21, 8–9); Report			Central court Referees: Bjarne Deiters (GER), Jesper Stumpfe (GER)

24 June 2026; 12:00	Benin	0–2	Argentina	Court 3
24 June 2026; 12:00	(0–10, 0–10)			Court 3

24 June 2026; 12:00	Denmark	2–0	Philippines	Court 2 Attendance: 65; Referees: Bulakorn Kongka (THA), Thiwakorn Sangjun (THA)
24 June 2026; 12:00	(22–14, 21–12); Report			Court 2 Attendance: 65; Referees: Bulakorn Kongka (THA), Thiwakorn Sangjun (THA)

== Consolation round ==
Pos	Team	Pld	W	L	Pts	SW	SL	SR	SPW	SPL	SPR
1	Vietnam	3	3	0	6	6	1	6.000	114	67	1.701
2	United States	3	2	1	4	5	2	2.500	99	81	1.222
3	Cook Islands	3	1	2	2	2	4	0.500	66	73	0.904
4	Benin (Note: Benin withdrew before the tournament due to visa issues.)	3	0	3	0	0	6	0.000	0	60	0.000

Source: IHF
Rules for classification: 1) Points; 2) Head-to-head points; 3) Head-to-head set difference; 4) Head-to-head points won; 5) Set difference; 6) Points won; 7) Draw.
Notes:

25 June 2026; 11:00	Vietnam	2–0	Cook Islands	Court 4 Attendance: 25; Referees: Víctor Rollán (ESP), Sergio Martínez (ESP)
25 June 2026; 11:00	(24–10, 17–10); Report			Court 4 Attendance: 25; Referees: Víctor Rollán (ESP), Sergio Martínez (ESP)

25 June 2026; 13:00	United States	2–0	Benin	Court 4
25 June 2026; 13:00	(10–0, 10–0); Report			Court 4

25 June 2026; 18:00	Cook Islands	2–0	Benin	Court 4
25 June 2026; 18:00	(10–0, 10–0); Report			Court 4

25 June 2026; 18:00	Vietnam	2–1	United States	Court 3 Attendance: 50; Referees: Víctor Rollán (ESP), Sergio Martínez (ESP)
25 June 2026; 18:00	(16–19, 24–14, 15–14); Report			Court 3 Attendance: 50; Referees: Víctor Rollán (ESP), Sergio Martínez (ESP)

26 June 2026; 11:00	Benin	0–2	Vietnam	Court 4
26 June 2026; 11:00	(0–10, 0–10); Report			Court 4

26 June 2026; 13:00	Cook Islands	0–2	United States	Court 4 Referees: Dario Rupčić (CRO), Ivica Botincan (CRO)
26 June 2026; 13:00	(14–18, 12–14); Report			Court 4 Referees: Dario Rupčić (CRO), Ivica Botincan (CRO)

== Main round ==
Points obtained against teams from the same group were carried over.

=== Group I ===
Pos	Team	Pld	W	L	Pts	SW	SL	SR	SPW	SPL	SPR	Qualification
1	Spain	5	5	0	10	10	0	MAX	218	150	1.453	Quarterfinals
2	Germany	5	4	1	8	8	3	2.667	212	147	1.442	Quarterfinals
3	Netherlands	5	3	2	6	6	4	1.500	206	172	1.198	Quarterfinals
4	Croatia (H)	5	2	3	4	4	7	0.571	175	209	0.837	Quarterfinals
5	Uruguay	5	1	4	2	4	8	0.500	169	183	0.923	
6	Puerto Rico	5	0	5	0	0	10	0.000	122	231	0.528	

Source: IHF
Rules for classification: 1) Points; 2) Head-to-head points; 3) Head-to-head set difference; 4) Head-to-head points won; 5) Set difference; 6) Points won; 7) Draw.
(H) Host

25 June 2026; 11:00	Spain	2–0	Netherlands	Court 3 Attendance: 100; Referees: Corina Radut (ROU), Daniela-Andreea Enache (ROU)
25 June 2026; 11:00	(15–14, 21–16); Report			Court 3 Attendance: 100; Referees: Corina Radut (ROU), Daniela-Andreea Enache (ROU)

25 June 2026; 11:00	Germany	2–0	Puerto Rico	Court 2 Attendance: 50; Referees: Sidiney dos Santos (BRA), Flavio de Moura (BRA)
25 June 2026; 11:00	(26–10, 30–4); Report			Court 2 Attendance: 50; Referees: Sidiney dos Santos (BRA), Flavio de Moura (BRA)

25 June 2026; 11:00	Uruguay	1–2	Croatia	Central court Attendance: 250; Referees: Khalid Al-Hail (QAT), Ali Al-Yafei (QAT)
25 June 2026; 11:00	(17–16, 16–19, 4–9); Report			Central court Attendance: 250; Referees: Khalid Al-Hail (QAT), Ali Al-Yafei (QAT)

25 June 2026; 19:00	Netherlands	2–0	Puerto Rico	Court 2 Attendance: 120; Referees: José María Galeano (PAR), José María Rodríguez (PAR)
25 June 2026; 19:00	(30–16, 24–18); Report			Court 2 Attendance: 120; Referees: José María Galeano (PAR), José María Rodríguez (PAR)

25 June 2026; 20:00	Uruguay	0–2	Spain	Court 4 Attendance: 50; Referees: Sidiney dos Santos (BRA), Flavio de Moura (BRA)
25 June 2026; 20:00	(14–20, 14–18); Report			Court 4 Attendance: 50; Referees: Sidiney dos Santos (BRA), Flavio de Moura (BRA)

25 June 2026; 20:00	Croatia	0–2	Germany	Central court Attendance: 350; Referees: Corina Radut (ROU), Daniela-Andreea Enache (ROU)
25 June 2026; 20:00	(12–22, 16–26); Report			Central court Attendance: 350; Referees: Corina Radut (ROU), Daniela-Andreea Enache (ROU)

26 June 2026; 11:00	Spain	2–0	Germany	Court 2 Attendance: 50; Referees: Khalid Al-Hail (QAT), Ali Al-Yafei (QAT)
26 June 2026; 11:00	(17–12, 17–12); Report			Court 2 Attendance: 50; Referees: Khalid Al-Hail (QAT), Ali Al-Yafei (QAT)

26 June 2026; 11:00	Puerto Rico	0–2	Uruguay	Court 3 Attendance: 50; Referees: Corina Radut (ROU), Daniela-Andreea Enache (ROU)
26 June 2026; 11:00	(10–20, 10–16); Report			Court 3 Attendance: 50; Referees: Corina Radut (ROU), Daniela-Andreea Enache (ROU)

26 June 2026; 11:00	Croatia	0–2	Netherlands	Central court Attendance: 150; Referees: José María Galeano (PAR), José María Rodríguez (PAR)
26 June 2026; 11:00	(16–26, 12–22); Report			Central court Attendance: 150; Referees: José María Galeano (PAR), José María Rodríguez (PAR)

=== Group II ===
Pos	Team	Pld	W	L	Pts	SW	SL	SR	SPW	SPL	SPR	Qualification
1	Denmark	5	4	1	8 (Note: Argentina 1–2 Denmark)	9	4	2.250	248	221	1.122	Quarterfinals
2	Argentina	5	4	1	8	9	4	2.250	224	206	1.087	Quarterfinals
3	Brazil	5	2	3	4 (Note: Brazil 4 Pts; Greece 2 Pts; Norway 0 Pts.)	6	7	0.857	226	190	1.189	Quarterfinals
4	Greece	5	2	3	4	6	6	1.000	208	210	0.990	Quarterfinals
5	Norway	5	2	3	4	5	7	0.714	237	228	1.039	
6	Philippines	5	1	4	2	2	9	0.222	143	231	0.619	

Source: IHF
Rules for classification: 1) Points; 2) Head-to-head points; 3) Head-to-head set difference; 4) Head-to-head points won; 5) Set difference; 6) Points won; 7) Draw.
Notes:

25 June 2026; 13:00	Denmark	2–1	Greece	Central court Attendance: 250; Referees: Víctor Rollán (ESP), Sergio Martínez (ESP)
25 June 2026; 13:00	(16–19, 26–24, 9–8); Report			Central court Attendance: 250; Referees: Víctor Rollán (ESP), Sergio Martínez (ESP)

25 June 2026; 13:00	Brazil	1–2	Philippines	Court 3 Attendance: 50; Referees: Bjarne Deiters (GER), Jesper Stumpfe (GER)
25 June 2026; 13:00	(26–14, 22–23, 6–7); Report			Court 3 Attendance: 50; Referees: Bjarne Deiters (GER), Jesper Stumpfe (GER)

25 June 2026; 13:00	Norway	1–2	Argentina	Court 2 Attendance: 50; Referees: Corina Radut (ROU), Daniela-Andreea Enache (ROU)
25 June 2026; 13:00	(16–22, 21–20, 10–11); Report			Court 2 Attendance: 50; Referees: Corina Radut (ROU), Daniela-Andreea Enache (ROU)

25 June 2026; 21:00	Argentina	2–1	Brazil	Court 3 Attendance: 87; Referees: Bjarne Deiters (GER), Jesper Stumpfe (GER)
25 June 2026; 21:00	(10–22, 17–16, 9–8); Report			Court 3 Attendance: 87; Referees: Bjarne Deiters (GER), Jesper Stumpfe (GER)

25 June 2026; 21:00	Greece	2–0	Philippines	Court 4 Referees: Bulakorn Kongka (THA), Thiwakorn Sangjun (THA)
25 June 2026; 21:00	(19–18, 21–12); Report			Court 4 Referees: Bulakorn Kongka (THA), Thiwakorn Sangjun (THA)

25 June 2026; 21:00	Norway	2–1	Denmark	Court 2 Attendance: 50; Referees: Dario Rupčić (CRO), Ivica Botincan (CRO)
25 June 2026; 21:00	(26–22, 24–27, 8–6); Report			Court 2 Attendance: 50; Referees: Dario Rupčić (CRO), Ivica Botincan (CRO)

26 June 2026; 13:00	Denmark	2–0	Brazil	Central court Attendance: 200; Referees: Corina Radut (ROU), Daniela-Andreea Enache (ROU)
26 June 2026; 13:00	(23–18, 17–13); Report			Central court Attendance: 200; Referees: Corina Radut (ROU), Daniela-Andreea Enache (ROU)

26 June 2026; 13:00	Philippines	0–2	Norway	Court 2 Attendance: 50; Referees: Bjarne Deiters (GER), Jesper Stumpfe (GER)
26 June 2026; 13:00	(10–28, 11–28); Report			Court 2 Attendance: 50; Referees: Bjarne Deiters (GER), Jesper Stumpfe (GER)

26 June 2026; 13:00	Argentina	2–0	Greece	Court 3 Attendance: 50; Referees: Khalid Al-Hail (QAT), Ali Al-Yafei (QAT)
26 June 2026; 13:00	(23–16, 19–16); Report			Court 3 Attendance: 50; Referees: Khalid Al-Hail (QAT), Ali Al-Yafei (QAT)

== Knockout stage ==
=== Bracket ===
Championship bracket

Quarter-finals
27 June
Spain	2
Greece	0
27 June
Argentina	2
Netherlands	0
27 June
Germany	1
Brazil	2
27 June
Denmark	2
Croatia	0

Semi-finals
27 June
Spain	1
Argentina	2
27 June
Brazil	0
Denmark	2

Final
28 June
Argentina	2
Denmark	1
Third place
28 June
Spain	2
Brazil	0

Fifth place bracket

5–8th place semifinals
27 June
Greece	2
Netherlands	1
27 June
Germany	2
Croatia	1

Fifth place game
28 June
Greece	0
Germany	2
Seventh place game
28 June
Netherlands	2
Croatia	0

9–16th place bracket

9–16th place quarterfinals
27 June
Norway	2
Benin	0
27 June
Puerto Rico	0
Vietnam	2
27 June
Uruguay	2
Cook Islands	0
27 June
Philippines	2
United States	0

9–12th place semifinals
27 June
Norway	2
Vietnam	1
27 June
Uruguay	2
Philippines	1

Ninth place game
28 June
Norway	2
Uruguay	0
Eleventh place game
28 June
Vietnam	2
Philippines	1

13–16th place bracket

13–16th place semifinals
27 June
Benin	0
Puerto Rico	2
27 June
Cook Islands	0
United States	2

13th place game
28 June
Puerto Rico	2
United States	0
15th place game
28 June
Benin	0
Cook Islands	2

=== 9–16th place quarterfinals ===
27 June 2026; 10:00	Uruguay	2–0	Cook Islands	Court 3 Attendance: 100; Referees: Bulakorn Kongka (THA), Thiwakorn Sangjun (THA)
27 June 2026; 10:00	(24–10, 24–4); Report			Court 3 Attendance: 100; Referees: Bulakorn Kongka (THA), Thiwakorn Sangjun (THA)

27 June 2026; 10:00	Philippines	2–0	United States	Court 4 Attendance: 45; Referees: José María Galeano (PAR), José María Rodríguez (PAR)
27 June 2026; 10:00	(20–18, 12–10); Report			Court 4 Attendance: 45; Referees: José María Galeano (PAR), José María Rodríguez (PAR)

27 June 2026; 12:00	Norway	2–0	Benin	Court 4
27 June 2026; 12:00	(10–0, 10–0); Report			Court 4

27 June 2026; 12:00	Puerto Rico	0–2	Vietnam	Court 3 Attendance: 115; Referees: Sidiney dos Santos (BRA), Flavio de Moura (BRA)
27 June 2026; 12:00	(14–22, 8–24); Report			Court 3 Attendance: 115; Referees: Sidiney dos Santos (BRA), Flavio de Moura (BRA)

=== Quarterfinals ===
27 June 2026; 10:00	Denmark	2–0	Croatia	Central court Attendance: 200; Referees: Sidiney dos Santos (BRA), Flavio de Moura (BRA)
27 June 2026; 10:00	(21–8, 26–18); Report			Central court Attendance: 200; Referees: Sidiney dos Santos (BRA), Flavio de Moura (BRA)

27 June 2026; 10:00	Brazil	2–1	Germany	Court 2 Attendance: 100; Referees: Khalid Al-Hail (QAT), Ali Al-Yafei (QAT)
27 June 2026; 10:00	(14–10, 14–15, 6–2); Report			Court 2 Attendance: 100; Referees: Khalid Al-Hail (QAT), Ali Al-Yafei (QAT)

27 June 2026; 12:00	Netherlands	0-2	Argentina	Central court Attendance: 200; Referees: José María Galeano (PAR), José María Rodríguez (PAR)
27 June 2026; 12:00	(16–23, 16–18); Report			Central court Attendance: 200; Referees: José María Galeano (PAR), José María Rodríguez (PAR)

27 June 2026; 12:00	Spain	2–0	Greece	Court 2 Attendance: 60; Referees: Bjarne Deiters (GER), Jesper Stumpfe (GER)
27 June 2026; 12:00	(20–18, 18–15); Report			Court 2 Attendance: 60; Referees: Bjarne Deiters (GER), Jesper Stumpfe (GER)

=== 13–16th place semifinals ===
27 June 2026; 18:00	Cook Islands	0–2	United States	Court 4 Attendance: 50; Referees: José María Galeano (PAR), José María Rodríguez (PAR)
27 June 2026; 18:00	(13–17, 12–22); Report			Court 4 Attendance: 50; Referees: José María Galeano (PAR), José María Rodríguez (PAR)

27 June 2026; 20:00	Benin	0–2	Puerto Rico	Court 4
27 June 2026; 20:00	(0–10, 0–10); Report			Court 4

=== 9–12th place semifinals ===
27 June 2026; 18:00	Uruguay	2–1	Philippines	Court 3 Attendance: 50; Referees: Bjarne Deiters (GER), Jesper Stumpfe (GER)
27 June 2026; 18:00	(23–16, 14–8, 5–2); Report			Court 3 Attendance: 50; Referees: Bjarne Deiters (GER), Jesper Stumpfe (GER)

27 June 2026; 20:00	Norway	2–1	Vietnam	Court 3 Referees: Corina Radut (ROU), Daniela-Andreea Enache (ROU)
27 June 2026; 20:00	(32–16, 18–19, 7–6); Report			Court 3 Referees: Corina Radut (ROU), Daniela-Andreea Enache (ROU)

=== 5–8th place semifinals ===
27 June 2026; 18:00	Croatia	1–2	Germany	Court 2 Attendance: 50; Referees: Corina Radut (ROU), Daniela-Andreea Enache (ROU)
27 June 2026; 18:00	(16–9, 14–24, 4–7); Report			Court 2 Attendance: 50; Referees: Corina Radut (ROU), Daniela-Andreea Enache (ROU)

27 June 2026; 20:00	Greece	2–1	Netherlands	Court 2 Attendance: 80; Referees: Víctor Rollán (ESP), Sergio Martínez (ESP)
27 June 2026; 20:00	(29–26, 18–26, 9–8); Report			Court 2 Attendance: 80; Referees: Víctor Rollán (ESP), Sergio Martínez (ESP)

=== Semifinals ===
27 June 2026; 18:00	Denmark	2–0	Brazil	Central court Attendance: 250; Referees: Khalid Al-Hail (QAT), Ali Al-Yafei (QAT)
27 June 2026; 18:00	(16–14, 21–16); Report			Central court Attendance: 250; Referees: Khalid Al-Hail (QAT), Ali Al-Yafei (QAT)

27 June 2026; 20:00	Spain	1–2	Argentina	Central court Attendance: 250; Referees: José María Galeano (PAR), José María Rodríguez (PAR)
27 June 2026; 20:00	(18–23, 18–17, 4–8); Report			Central court Attendance: 250; Referees: José María Galeano (PAR), José María Rodríguez (PAR)

=== 15th place game ===
28 June 2026; 11:00	Benin	0–2	Cook Islands	Court 4
28 June 2026; 11:00	(0–10, 0–10); Report			Court 4

=== 13th place game ===
28 June 2026; 11:00	Puerto Rico	2–0	United States	Court 3 Attendance: 50; Referees: Víctor Rollán (ESP), Sergio Martínez (ESP)
28 June 2026; 11:00	(22–18, 18–16); Report			Court 3 Attendance: 50; Referees: Víctor Rollán (ESP), Sergio Martínez (ESP)

=== Eleventh place game ===
28 June 2026; 12:00	Vietnam	2–1	Philippines	Court 4 Attendance: 20; Referees: José María Galeano (PAR), José María Rodríguez (PAR)
28 June 2026; 12:00	(14–16, 16–12, 8–4); Report			Court 4 Attendance: 20; Referees: José María Galeano (PAR), José María Rodríguez (PAR)

=== Ninth place game ===
28 June 2026; 12:00	Norway	2–0	Uruguay	Court 2 Attendance: 50; Referees: Sylwia Bartkowiak (POL), Weronika Łakomy (POL)
28 June 2026; 12:00	(26–22, 26–18); Report			Court 2 Attendance: 50; Referees: Sylwia Bartkowiak (POL), Weronika Łakomy (POL)

=== Seventh place game ===
28 June 2026; 12:00	Netherlands	2–0	Croatia	Central court Attendance: 250; Referees: Bulakorn Kongka (THA), Thiwakorn Sangjun (THA)
28 June 2026; 12:00	(18–16, 16–14); Report			Central court Attendance: 250; Referees: Bulakorn Kongka (THA), Thiwakorn Sangjun (THA)

=== Fifth place game ===
28 June 2026; 11:00	Greece	0–2	Germany	Central court Attendance: 175; Referees: Sidiney dos Santos (BRA), Flavio de Moura (BRA)
28 June 2026; 11:00	(17–18, 18–20); Report			Central court Attendance: 175; Referees: Sidiney dos Santos (BRA), Flavio de Moura (BRA)

=== Third place game ===
28 June 2026; 17:00	Spain	2–0	Brazil	Central court Attendance: 350; Referees: Sylwia Bartkowiak (POL), Weronika Łakomy (POL)
28 June 2026; 17:00	(21–20, 25–16); Report			Central court Attendance: 350; Referees: Sylwia Bartkowiak (POL), Weronika Łakomy (POL)

=== Final ===
28 June 2026; 19:00	Argentina	2–1	Denmark	Central court Referees: Dario Rupčić (CRO), Ivica Botincan (CRO)
28 June 2026; 19:00	(20–14, 14–27, 6–2); Report			Central court Referees: Dario Rupčić (CRO), Ivica Botincan (CRO)

== Final ranking ==
Rank	Team
1st place, gold medalist(s)	Argentina
2nd place, silver medalist(s)	Denmark
3rd place, bronze medalist(s)	Spain
4	Brazil
5	Germany
6	Greece
7	Netherlands
8	Croatia
9	Norway
10	Uruguay
11	Vietnam
12	Philippines
13	Puerto Rico
14	United States
15	Cook Islands
WD	Benin

== Statistics and awards ==
=== Top goalscorers ===
Rank	Name	Points
1	(Brazil) Beatriz Correia	132
2	(Netherlands) Meike Kruijer	123
3	(Netherlands) Anna Buter	120
4	(Greece) Eleni Kerlidi	111
4	(Spain) Jimena Laguna	111
6	(Argentina) Gisella Bonomi	100
7	(Denmark) Line Larsen	99
8	(Croatia) Lara Miholić	97
9	(Germany) Isabel Kattner	90
10	(Spain) Mariam González	88

Source: IHF

=== Top goalkeepers ===
Rank	Name	%	Saves	Shots
1	(Spain) Paula Quiles	52	12	23
2	(Spain) Patricia Encinas	34	66	197
2	(Uruguay) Brenda Pianavia	34	67	200
4	(Denmark) Ditte Vind	31	69	220
4	(Greece) Emmanouela-Styliani Tsiknaki	31	16	52
6	(Norway) Thea Granlund	30	37	124
7	(Vietnam) Nguyễn Thị Nhung	28	58	210
8	(United States) Staci Self	27	59	216
9	(Brazil) Ingrid de Souza	25	50	200
10	(Norway) Silje Brendbakken	24	22	92

Source: IHF

=== Awards ===
The awards were announced on 28 June 2026.

Position	Player
MVP	(Argentina) Zoe Turnes
Goalkeeper	(Spain) Patricia Encinas
Right wing	(Greece) Eleni Kerlidi
Left wing	(Brazil) Beatriz Correia
Playmaker	(Denmark) Line Larsen
Pivot	(Germany) Isabel Kattner
Defender	(Argentina) Alma Molina
