= Ingrid Ødegård =

Norwegian handball player (born 1983)

Personal information
- Nationality: Norwegian
- Born: 1 March 1983 (age 43) Trondheim, Norway
- Height: 1.77 m (5 ft 10 in)

Sport
- Sport: Handball
- Position: Goalkeeper
- Current club: Retired

Senior clubs
- Years: Team
- 2002–2005: Sola HK
- 2005–2008: Larvik HK
- 2008–2012: FC Midtjylland
- 2012–2014: HC Odense
- 2014–2015: Byåsen HE
National team
Years	Team	Apps	(Gls)
2010–2011	Norway	11	(0)
Medal record
Women's beach handball
World Championship
Gold medal – first place	2010 Turkey
European Championship
Silver medal – second place	2009 Norway
Bronze medal – third place	2007 Italy
- Updated on 31 July 2011

Ingrid Ødegård (born 1 March 1983, in Trondheim) is a former Norwegian handball goalkeeper, who last played for Byåsen HE.

== Club career ==
Ingrid Ødegård started her professional career in Sola HK, Stavanger. After three seasons with the club, she received an offer from Larvik HK and started playing for the Norwegian champion in 2005. With Larvik, she won the Norwegian Championship several times and the Cup Winners' Cup in 2008. However, being the substitute of Lene Rantala, Ødegård could not enjoy much playing time. In 2008, she left Larvik and moved to Denmark to play for FCM Håndbold and in 2012 went on to play for HC Odense. After returning to the Norwegian league in 2014, and playing for Byåsen HE, Ødegård announced in late December 2015 that she is pregnant yet again and has decided to retire.

== National team ==
=== Handball ===
Ingrid Ødegård made her debut on the national team at junior level in 2002. In 2003, she won a bronze medal at the Junior World Championship, together with Linn-Kristin Riegelhuth, Linn Jørum Sulland and Gøril Snorroeggen among others.

Ødegård debuted with the senior national team in June 2010 against Denmark, and played 11 matches for the senior Norwegian national team in total.

=== Beach handball ===
Ødegård received a bronze medal at the 2007 European Beach Handball Championship, where she was named Best Goalkeeper. In 2009, she was part of the team that won a silver medal at the European Championship in Larvik. She received her first gold medal at the 2010 World Championship in Turkey.
