= Norway women's national beach handball team =

National sports team

Norway

Information
- Association: Norwegian Handball Federation
- Coach: Katinka Haltvik

Colours
Home	Away	Uniform

Results

World Games
- Appearances: 3 (First in 2013)
- Best result: 2nd (2022)

World Championship
- Appearances: 9 (First in 2008)
- Best result: 1st (2010)
- Last updated on Unknown.

Norway women's national beach handball team
Medal record

Representing Norway

Women's beach handball

World Championship
Gold medal – first place	2010 Turkey	
Silver medal – second place	2018 Russia	
Bronze medal – third place	2012 Oman	
Bronze medal – third place	2014 Brazil	
Bronze medal – third place	2016 Hungary	

European Championship
Gold medal – first place	2017 Croatia	
Silver medal – second place	2009 Norway	
Silver medal – second place	2015 Spain	
Bronze medal – third place	2007 Italy	
Bronze medal – third place	2013 Denmark	

World Games
Bronze medal – third place	2013 Colombia	Team
Silver medal – second place	2022 United States	Team

The Norway women's national beach handball team is the national team of Norway. It is governed by the Norwegian Handball Federation and it represents Norway in international beach handball competitions.

== Results ==
Norway was the bronze medal team at the 2007 European Beach Handball Championship, where Linn Jørum Sulland finished as top scorer and Ingrid Ødegård was named Best Goalkeeper.

In 2009 they played in the final of the European tournament, but lost to Italy after an even shootout and a golden goal in front of a home audience in Larvik. Line player Ane Brustuen was awarded Best Player of the women's tournament.

They received their first gold medal in 2010, at the 2010 World Championship in Antalya, Turkey. Ane Brustuen was named MVP of the tournament.

They made bronze at the 2012, 2014 and 2016 world championships.

=== World Championships ===
Year	Position
(Spain) 2008	6th place
(Turkey) 2010	1st place
(Oman) 2012	3rd place
(Brazil) 2014	3rd place
(Hungary) 2016	3rd place
(Russia) 2018	2nd place
(Greece) 2022	11th place
(China) 2024	11th place
(Croatia) 2026	9th place
Total	9/11

=== World Games ===
Year	Position
(Colombia) 2013	3rd place
(Poland) 2017	4th place
(United States) 2022	2nd place
Total	3/6

== Controversy ==
In 2021, the team was fined €1500 for being improperly dressed after the women wore bike shorts instead of bikini bottoms at a European championship match in Bulgaria. Critics derided the fine and the underlying rule. Norway's minister for culture and sport Abid Raja described the fine as being "completely ridiculous". Former tennis champion Billie Jean King supported the team tweeting "The sexualisation of women athletes must stop". Although the Norwegian Handball Federation announced they would pay the fines, pop singer Pink offered to pay for them. Later, in November 2021, the International Handball Federation changed their dress rules to allow female players to wear some kinds of shorts, specifying "Female athletes must wear short tight pants with a close fit".
