= United States women's national beach handball team =

United States

Information
- Association: USA Team Handball
- Coach: Lyndon Suvanto
- Assistant coach: Alex Browne

Colours
Home	Away

Results

World Championship
- Appearances: 4 (First in 2018)
- Best result: 14th (2018, 2022, 2026)
- Last updated on Unknown.

The United States women's national beach handball team is the national team of United States. It takes part in international beach handball competitions.

== Results ==
=== World Championships ===
Year	Position
(Egypt) 2004	Did not qualify
(Brazil) 2006	Did not qualify
(Spain) 2008	Did not qualify
(Turkey) 2010	Did not qualify
(Oman) 2012	Did not qualify
(Brazil) 2014	Did not qualify
(Hungary) 2016	Did not qualify
(Russia) 2018	14th
(Greece) 2022	14th
(China) 2024	16th
(Croatia) 2026	16th
Total	4/11

=== Pan American Championships ===
Year	Position
(Brazil) 1998	Did not qualify
(Brazil) 1999	Did not qualify
(Argentina) 2004	Did not qualify
(Argentina) 2008	Did not qualify
(Argentina) 2012	5th
(Paraguay) 2014	Did not qualify
(Venezuela) 2016	Did not qualify
(United States) 2018	6th
(Trinidad and Tobago) 2019	
(Mexico) 2022	2nd
(Puerto Rico) 2024	1st
Total	5/9
