= Denmark women's national beach handball team =

Denmark

Information
- Association: Dansk Håndbold Forbund
- Coach: Morten Holmen
- Assistant coach: Tina Jakobsen

Colours
Home	Away	Uniform

Results

World Championship
- Appearances: 7 (First in 2010)
- Best result: 2nd (2010, 2012, 2026)
- Last updated on Unknown.

Denmark women's national beach handball team
Medal record

Women's beach handball

Representing Denmark

World Championship
Silver medal – second place	2010 Turkey	
Silver medal – second place	2012 Oman	
Silver medal – second place	2026 Croatia	

World Beach Games
Gold medal – first place	2019 Qatar	Team

European Championship
Gold medal – first place	2019 Poland	
Silver medal – second place	2011 Croatia	
Silver medal – second place	2013 Denmark	
Silver medal – second place	2021 Bulgaria	

The Denmark women's national beach handball team is the national team of Denmark. It is governed by the Danish Handball Federation and takes part in international beach handball competitions.

== Results ==
=== World Championships ===
Year	Position
(Egypt) 2004	Did not qualify
(Brazil) 2006	Did not qualify
(Spain) 2008	Did not qualify
(Turkey) 2010	2nd place
(Oman) 2012	2nd place
(Brazil) 2014	7th place
(Hungary) 2016	Did not qualify
(Russia) 2018	5th place
(Greece) 2022	5th place
(China) 2024	4th place
(Croatia) 2026	2nd place
Total	7/11

=== World Games ===
Year	Position
(Japan) 2001	Did notqualify
(Germany) 2005	Did notqualify
(Taiwan) 2009	Did notqualify
(Colombia) 2013	Did notqualify
(Poland) 2017	Did notqualify
(United States) 2022	Did notqualify
(China) 2025	4th place
Total	1/7

=== World Beach Games ===
Year	Position
(Qatar) 2019	1st place
Total	1/1

=== European Games results ===
Year	Position
(Poland) 2023	1st place
Total	1/1

=== European Beach Handball Championship ===
Year	Position
(Italy) 2000	did not qualify/did not enter
(Spain) 2002	did not qualify/did not enter
(Turkey) 2004	did not qualify/did not enter
(Germany) 2005	did not qualify/did not enter
(Italy) 2007	15th place
(Norway) 2009	7th place
(Croatia) 2011	Silver medal
(Denmark) 2013	Silver medal
(Spain) 2015	Did not qualify
(Croatia) 2017	4th place
(Poland) 2019	Gold medal
(Bulgaria) 2021	Silver medal
(Portugal) 2023	7th place
(Turkey) 2025	5th place
Total	9/14

== See also ==
- Denmark men's national beach handball team
