= Portugal women's national beach handball team =

Portugal

Information
- Association: Portuguese Handball Federation
- Coach: Agustin Rodriguez

Colours
Home	Away

Results

World Championship
- Appearances: 2 (First in 2022)
- Best result: 6th (2024)
- Last updated on Unknown.

The Portugal women's national beach handball team is the national team of Portugal. It is governed by the Portuguese Handball Federation and takes part in international beach handball competitions.

== World Championship results ==
Year	Position
(Egypt) 2004	Did not qualify
(Brazil) 2006	Did not qualify
(Spain) 2008	Did not qualify
(Turkey) 2010	Did not qualify
(Oman) 2012	Did not qualify
(Brazil) 2014	Did not qualify
(Hungary) 2016	Did not qualify
(Russia) 2018	Did not qualify
(Italy) 2020	Cancelled
(Greece) 2022	8th place
(China) 2024	6th place
Total	2/10
