= Germany women's national beach handball team =

Germany

Information
- Association: German Handball Association
- Coach: Alexander Novakovic
- Assistant coach: Ruben Voßhans

Colours
Home	Away

Results

World Championship
- Appearances: 4 (First in 2006)
- Best result: Champions (2022, 2024)
- Last updated on Unknown.

The Germany women's national beach handball team is the national team of Germany. It is governed by the German Handball Association and takes part in international beach handball competitions.

== Results ==
=== World Championships ===
- 2006 –
- 2022 –
- 2024 –
- 2026 – 5th place

=== World Games ===
- 2001 –
- 2004 –
- 2022 –

=== European Championships ===
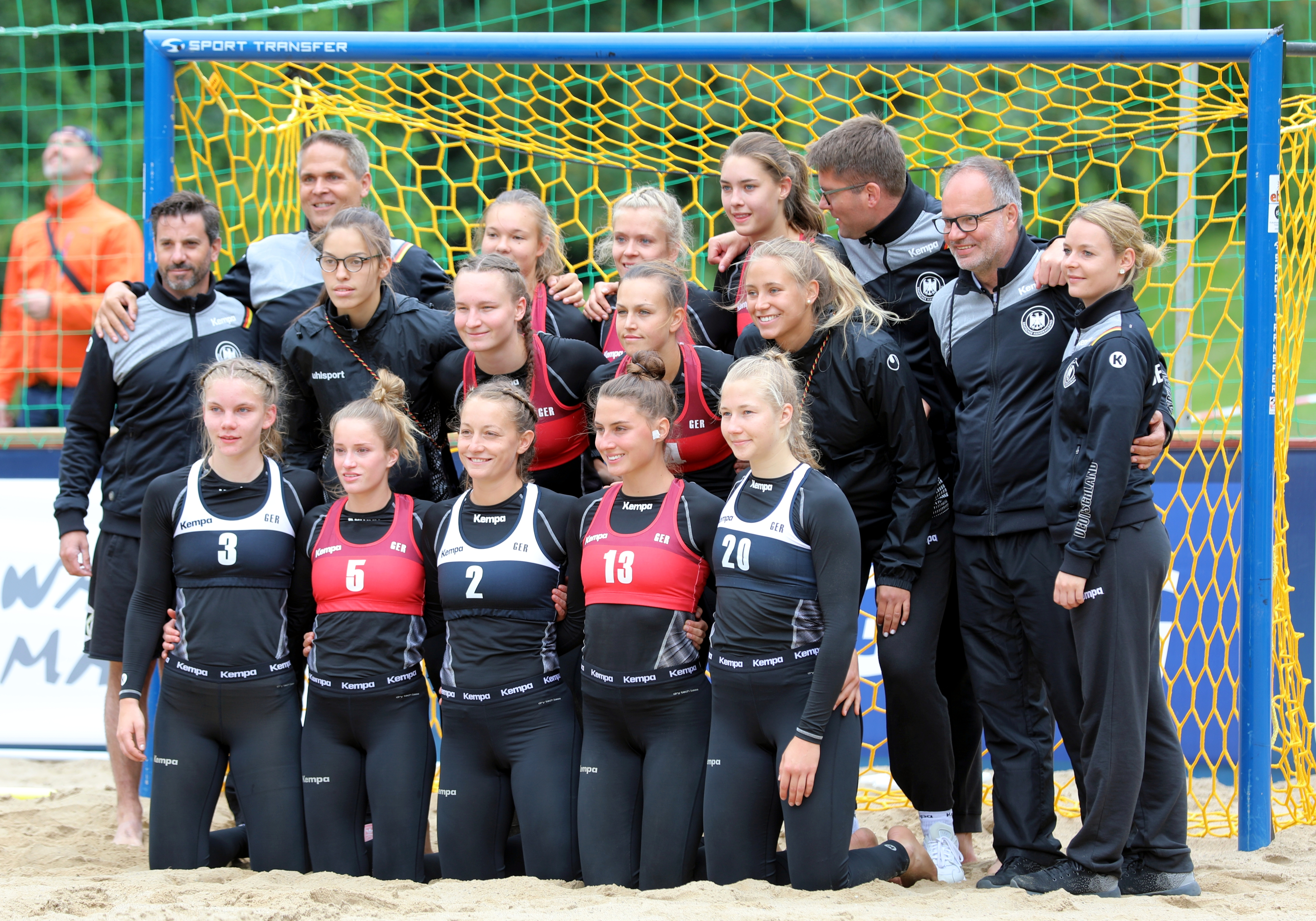
German national team at the 2019 European Championships

Champions: (2006, 2021, 2023)

Runners-up: (2001, 2007, 2025)

Third place: (2004)
