= Greece women's national beach handball team =

Greece

Information
- Association: Hellenic Handball Federation
- Coach: Maria Karantoni
- Assistant coach: Sofia Dimitriou

Colours
Home	Away

Results

World Championship
- Appearances: 4 (First in 2018)
- Best result: 1st (2018)
- Last updated on Unknown.

Greece women's national beach handball team
Medal record

World Championship
Gold medal – first place	2018 Russia	

Mediterranean Beach Games
Gold medal – first place	2019 Patras	
Silver medal – second place	2015 Pescara	
Silver medal – second place	2023 Heraklion	

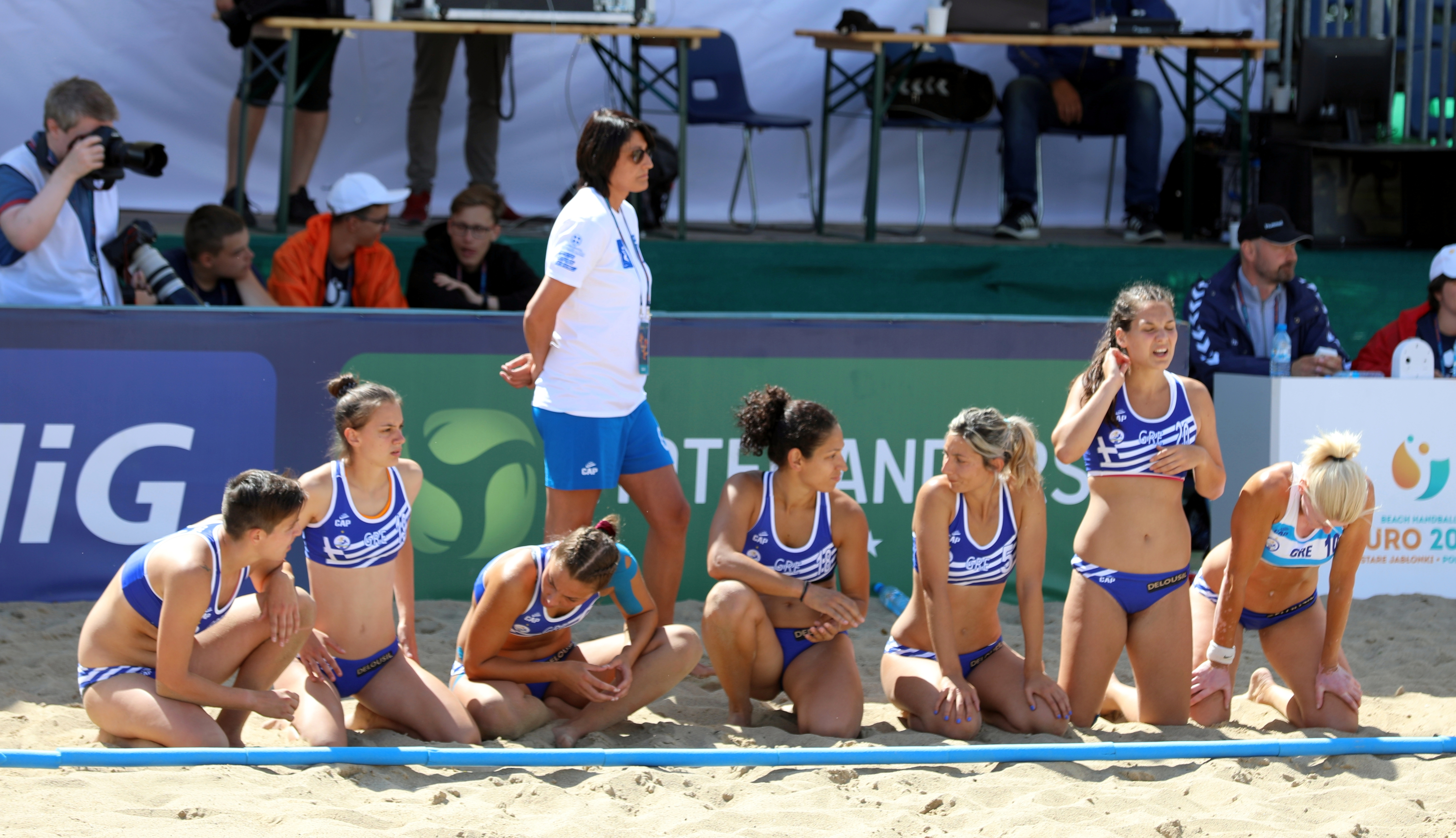
Greek Team at the Euro 2019

The Greece women's national beach handball team is the national team of Greece. It takes part in international beach handball competitions.

== Results ==
=== World Championships ===
- 2018 – 1st place
- 2022 – 4th place
- 2024 – 10th place
- 2026 – 6th place

=== European Games ===
- 2023 – 7th place

=== Mediterranean Beach Games ===
- 2015 – 2nd place (Silver medal)
- 2019 – 1st place (Gold medal)
- 2023 – 2nd place (Silver medal)
