= 2022 Women's Beach Handball World Championships =

Tournament details
- Host country: Greece
- Venue(s): Karteros Beach Sports Center
- Dates: 21–26 June
- Teams: 16 (from 5 confederations)

Final positions
- Champions: Germany (1st title)
- Runners-up: Spain
- Third place: Netherlands
- Fourth place: Greece

Tournament statistics
- Top scorer(s): (United States) Christine Mansour (164 points)

Awards
- Best player: (Spain) Asuncion Batista

The 2022 Women's IHF Beach Handball World Championships was the ninth edition of the championship, held from 21 to 26 June 2022 at Heraklion, Crete. Greece under the aegis of International Handball Federation (IHF). It was the first time in history that the championship will be organised by Hellenic Handball Federation.

Germany captured their first title with a finals win over Spain.

== Qualification ==
Qualification	Vacancies	Qualified
Host	1	Greece
Runner-up of 2018 World Championship	1	Norway
2022 Asian Beach Handball Championship	2	Thailand; Vietnam
2021 European Beach Handball Championship	6	Denmark; Germany; Hungary; Netherlands; Portugal; Spain
2022 South and Central American Beach Handball Championship	3	Argentina; Brazil; Uruguay
2022 Oceania Beach Handball Championship	1	Australia
2022 Nor.ca Beach Handball Championship	2	United States; Mexico

== Draw ==
The draw took place on 13 May 2022.

== Preliminary round ==
All times are local (UTC+3).

=== Group A ===
Pos	Team	Pld	W	L	Pts	SW	SL	SR	SPW	SPL	SPR	Qualification
1	Greece (H)	3	3	0	6	6	1	6.000	138	114	1.211	Main round
2	Portugal	3	2	1	4	4	3	1.333	106	104	1.019	Main round
3	Thailand	3	1	2	2	3	4	0.750	114	128	0.891	Main round
4	Mexico	3	0	3	0	1	6	0.167	115	127	0.906	Consolation round

Source: IHF
Rules for classification: 1) Points; 2) Head-to-head points; 3) Head-to-head set difference; 4) Head-to-head points won; 5) Set difference; 6) Points won; 7) Draw.
(H) Host

21 June 2022; 11:30	Portugal	2–1	Thailand	Court 2 Referees: Dario Rupčić (CRO), Ivica Botinčan (CRO)
21 June 2022; 11:30	(10–16, 21–14, 8–4); Report			Court 2 Referees: Dario Rupčić (CRO), Ivica Botinčan (CRO)

21 June 2022; 11:30	Greece	2–1	Mexico	Center court Referees: Khalid Al-Hail (QAT), Ali Al-Yafei (QAT)
21 June 2022; 11:30	(23–18, 18–22, 7–6); Report			Center court Referees: Khalid Al-Hail (QAT), Ali Al-Yafei (QAT)

21 June 2022; 16:40	Mexico	0–2	Portugal	Court 3 Referees: Sydiney Dos Santos (BRA), Flavio Asis (BRA)
21 June 2022; 16:40	(18–23, 16–18); Report			Court 3 Referees: Sydiney Dos Santos (BRA), Flavio Asis (BRA)

21 June 2022; 21:50	Thailand	0–2	Greece	Center court Referees: Mathieu Fanack (FRA), Cédric Daré (FRA)
21 June 2022; 21:50	(24–27, 18–27); Report			Center court Referees: Mathieu Fanack (FRA), Cédric Daré (FRA)

22 June 2022; 19:10	Greece	2–0	Portugal	Center court Referees: Pedro Ortega (VEN), Miguel Aular (VEN)
22 June 2022; 19:10	(15–12, 21–14); Report			Center court Referees: Pedro Ortega (VEN), Miguel Aular (VEN)

22 June 2022; 19:10	Mexico	0–2	Thailand	Court 2 Referees: Luciano Cardone (ITA), Sebatiano Manuele (ITA)
22 June 2022; 19:10	(19–20, 16–18); Report			Court 2 Referees: Luciano Cardone (ITA), Sebatiano Manuele (ITA)

=== Group B ===
Pos	Team	Pld	W	L	Pts	SW	SL	SR	SPW	SPL	SPR	Qualification
1	Denmark	3	3	0	6	6	0	MAX	150	120	1.250	Main round
2	Spain	3	2	1	4	4	2	2.000	136	101	1.347	Main round
3	United States	3	1	2	2	2	5	0.400	118	158	0.747	Main round
4	Vietnam	3	0	3	0	1	6	0.167	111	136	0.816	Consolation round

Source: IHF
Rules for classification: 1) Points; 2) Head-to-head points; 3) Head-to-head set difference; 4) Head-to-head points won; 5) Set difference; 6) Points won; 7) Draw.

21 June 2022; 12:20	Spain	2–0	United States	Court 3 Referees: Pedro Ortega (VEN), Miguel Aular (VEN)
21 June 2022; 12:20	(32–20, 19–13); Report			Court 3 Referees: Pedro Ortega (VEN), Miguel Aular (VEN)

21 June 2022; 13:10	Denmark	2–0	Vietnam	Center court Referees: Sydiney Dos Santos (BRA), Flavio Asis (BRA)
21 June 2022; 13:10	(25–16, 24–21); Report			Center court Referees: Sydiney Dos Santos (BRA), Flavio Asis (BRA)

21 June 2022; 18:20	Vietnam	0–2	Spain	Court 3 Referees: Dario Rupčić (CRO), Ivica Botinčan (CRO)
21 June 2022; 18:20	(12–24, 12–19); Report			Court 3 Referees: Dario Rupčić (CRO), Ivica Botinčan (CRO)

21 June 2022; 21:00	United States	0–2	Denmark	Center court Referees: Ana Barbosa (POR), Nádia Lemos (POR)
21 June 2022; 21:00	(25–33, 16–24); Report			Center court Referees: Ana Barbosa (POR), Nádia Lemos (POR)

22 June 2022; 17:30	Vietnam	1–2	United States	Court 2 Referees: Mathieu Fanack (FRA), Cédric Daré (FRA)
22 June 2022; 17:30	(20–24, 23–12, 7–8); Report			Court 2 Referees: Mathieu Fanack (FRA), Cédric Daré (FRA)

22 June 2022; 17:30	Denmark	2–0	Spain	Center court Referees: Johan Gomér (SWE), Martin Gomér (SWE)
22 June 2022; 17:30	(21–20, 23–22); Report			Center court Referees: Johan Gomér (SWE), Martin Gomér (SWE)

=== Group C ===
Pos	Team	Pld	W	L	Pts	SW	SL	SR	SPW	SPL	SPR	Qualification
1	Netherlands	3	3	0	6	6	0	MAX	143	98	1.459	Main round
2	Argentina	3	2	1	4	4	2	2.000	122	96	1.271	Main round
3	Uruguay	3	1	2	2	2	4	0.500	93	97	0.959	Main round
4	Australia	3	0	3	0	0	6	0.000	67	125	0.536	Consolation round

Source: IHF
Rules for classification: 1) Points; 2) Head-to-head points; 3) Head-to-head set difference; 4) Head-to-head points won; 5) Set difference; 6) Points won; 7) Draw.

21 June 2022; 10:40	Argentina	2–0	Uruguay	Court 3 Referees: Mathieu Fanack (FRA), Cédric Daré (FRA)
21 June 2022; 10:40	(20–16, 18–14); Report			Court 3 Referees: Mathieu Fanack (FRA), Cédric Daré (FRA)

21 June 2022; 12:20	Netherlands	2–0	Australia	Center court Referees: Johan Gomér (SWE), Martin Gomér (SWE)
21 June 2022; 12:20	(24–14, 28–10); Report			Center court Referees: Johan Gomér (SWE), Martin Gomér (SWE)

21 June 2022; 17:30	Australia	0–2	Argentina	Court 2 Referees: Pedro Ortega (VEN), Miguel Aular (VEN)
21 June 2022; 17:30	(8–26, 14–16); Report			Court 2 Referees: Pedro Ortega (VEN), Miguel Aular (VEN)

21 June 2022; 18:20	Uruguay	0–2	Netherlands	Center court Referees: Luciano Cardone (ITA), Sebatiano Manuele (ITA)
21 June 2022; 18:20	(16–19, 16–19); Report			Center court Referees: Luciano Cardone (ITA), Sebatiano Manuele (ITA)

22 June 2022; 10:30	Uruguay	2–0	Australia	Court 2 Referees: Sylwia Bartkowiak (POL), Weronika Łakomy (POL)
22 June 2022; 10:30	(15–11, 16–10); Report			Court 2 Referees: Sylwia Bartkowiak (POL), Weronika Łakomy (POL)

22 June 2022; 10:30	Argentina	0–2	Netherlands	Center court Referees: Dario Rupčić (CRO), Ivica Botinčan (CRO)
22 June 2022; 10:30	(18–28, 24–26); Report			Center court Referees: Dario Rupčić (CRO), Ivica Botinčan (CRO)

=== Group D ===
Pos	Team	Pld	W	L	Pts	SW	SL	SR	SPW	SPL	SPR	Qualification
1	Germany	3	3	0	6	6	0	MAX	126	49	2.571	Main round
2	Brazil	3	2	1	4	4	4	1.000	103	121	0.851	Main round
3	Norway	3	1	2	2	3	5	0.600	89	135	0.659	Main round
4	Hungary	3	0	3	0	2	6	0.333	113	126	0.897	Consolation round

Source: IHF
Rules for classification: 1) Points; 2) Head-to-head points; 3) Head-to-head set difference; 4) Head-to-head points won; 5) Set difference; 6) Points won; 7) Draw.

21 June 2022; 10:40	Norway	2–1	Hungary	Center court Referees: Ana Barbosa (POR), Nádia Lemos (POR)
21 June 2022; 10:40	(20–15, 20–22, 9–6); Report			Center court Referees: Ana Barbosa (POR), Nádia Lemos (POR)

21 June 2022; 10:40	Germany	2–0	Brazil	Court 2 Referees: Sylwia Bartkowiak (POL), Weronika Łakomy (POL)
21 June 2022; 10:40	(26–14, 16–4); Report			Court 2 Referees: Sylwia Bartkowiak (POL), Weronika Łakomy (POL)

21 June 2022; 16:40	Hungary	0–2	Germany	Center court Referees: Dario Rupčić (CRO), Ivica Botinčan (CRO)
21 June 2022; 16:40	(14–18, 17–20); Report			Center court Referees: Dario Rupčić (CRO), Ivica Botinčan (CRO)

21 June 2022; 17:30	Brazil	2–1	Norway	Center court Referees: Khalid Al-Hail (QAT), Ali Al-Yafei (QAT)
21 June 2022; 17:30	(18–14, 18–20, 10–6); Report			Center court Referees: Khalid Al-Hail (QAT), Ali Al-Yafei (QAT)

22 June 2022; 15:50	Germany	2–0	Norway	Center court Referees: Pedro Ortega (VEN), Miguel Aular (VEN)
22 June 2022; 15:50	(19–14, 27–20); Report			Center court Referees: Pedro Ortega (VEN), Miguel Aular (VEN)

22 June 2022; 16:40	Brazil	2–1	Hungary	Center court Referees: Mathieu Fanack (FRA), Cédric Daré (FRA)
22 June 2022; 16:40	(10–15, 19–18, 10–6); Report			Center court Referees: Mathieu Fanack (FRA), Cédric Daré (FRA)

== Consolation round ==
Pos	Team	Pld	W	L	Pts	SW	SL	SR	SPW	SPL	SPR
1	Hungary	3	3	0	6	6	0	MAX	133	83	1.602
2	Vietnam	3	2	1	4	4	3	1.333	125	122	1.025
3	Mexico	3	1	2	2	2	4	0.500	99	108	0.917
4	Australia	3	0	3	0	1	6	0.167	78	122	0.639

Source: IHF
Rules for classification: 1) Points; 2) Head-to-head points; 3) Head-to-head set difference; 4) Head-to-head points won; 5) Set difference; 6) Points won; 7) Draw.

23 June 2022; 13:10	Mexico	2–0	Australia	Court 2 Referees: Mohamed Ben Salah (TUN), Mohamed Drissi (TUN)
23 June 2022; 13:10	(20–9, 15–12); Report			Court 2 Referees: Mohamed Ben Salah (TUN), Mohamed Drissi (TUN)

23 June 2022; 14:00	Vietnam	0–2	Hungary	Center court Referees: Pedro Ortega (VEN), Miguel Aular (VEN)
23 June 2022; 14:00	(19–26, 18–21); Report			Center court Referees: Pedro Ortega (VEN), Miguel Aular (VEN)

23 June 2022; 18:50	Australia	1–2	Vietnam	Court 2 Referees: Ana Barbosa (POR), Nádia Lemos (POR)
23 June 2022; 18:50	(12–16, 20–19, 4–7); Report			Court 2 Referees: Ana Barbosa (POR), Nádia Lemos (POR)

23 June 2022; 21:20	Hungary	2–0	Mexico	Center court Referees: Sydiney Dos Santos (BRA), Flavio Asis (BRA)
23 June 2022; 21:20	(21–10, 20–15); Report			Center court Referees: Sydiney Dos Santos (BRA), Flavio Asis (BRA)

24 June 2022; 09:30	Australia	0–2	Hungary	Center court Referees: Mohamed Ben Salah (TUN), Mohamed Drissi (TUN)
24 June 2022; 09:30	(12–20, 9–25); Report			Center court Referees: Mohamed Ben Salah (TUN), Mohamed Drissi (TUN)

24 June 2022; 10:20	Mexico	0–2	Vietnam	Court 2 Referees: Luciano Cardone (ITA), Sebatiano Manuele (ITA)
24 June 2022; 10:20	(16–21, 23–25); Report			Court 2 Referees: Luciano Cardone (ITA), Sebatiano Manuele (ITA)

== Main round ==
Points obtained against teams from the same group were carried over.

=== Group I ===
Pos	Team	Pld	W	L	Pts	SW	SL	SR	SPW	SPL	SPR	Qualification
1	Greece (H)	5	5	0	10	10	2	5.000	237	205	1.156	Quarterfinals
2	Denmark	5	4	1	8	9	2	4.500	240	208	1.154	Quarterfinals
3	Spain	5	3	2	6	7	5	1.400	240	207	1.159	Quarterfinals
4	Portugal	5	2	3	4	4	7	0.571	169	186	0.909	Quarterfinals
5	Thailand	5	1	4	2	4	9	0.444	221	249	0.888	
6	United States	5	0	5	0	1	10	0.100	197	249	0.791	

Source: IHF
Rules for classification: 1) Points; 2) Head-to-head points; 3) Head-to-head set difference; 4) Head-to-head points won; 5) Set difference; 6) Points won; 7) Draw.
(H) Host

23 June 2022; 09:00	Thailand	0–2	Denmark	Center court Referees: Mohamed Ben Salah (TUN), Mohamed Drissi (TUN)
23 June 2022; 09:00	(24–30, 18–24); Report			Center court Referees: Mohamed Ben Salah (TUN), Mohamed Drissi (TUN)

23 June 2022; 09:00	Portugal	0–2	Spain	Court 2 Referees: Sylwia Bartkowiak (POL), Weronika Łakomy (POL)
23 June 2022; 09:00	(16–23, 14–18); Report			Court 2 Referees: Sylwia Bartkowiak (POL), Weronika Łakomy (POL)

23 June 2022; 13:10	Greece	2–0	United States	Center court Referees: Sydiney Dos Santos (BRA), Flavio Asis (BRA)
23 June 2022; 13:10	(21–18, 23–14); Report			Center court Referees: Sydiney Dos Santos (BRA), Flavio Asis (BRA)

23 June 2022; 18:00	Portugal	0–2	Denmark	Center court Referees: Mathieu Fanack (FRA), Cédric Daré (FRA)
23 June 2022; 18:00	(18–22, 18–19); Report			Center court Referees: Mathieu Fanack (FRA), Cédric Daré (FRA)

23 June 2022; 18:00	Thailand	2–1	United States	Court 2 Referees: Pedro Ortega (VEN), Miguel Aular (VEN)
23 June 2022; 18:00	(24–23, 23–24, 12–10); Report			Court 2 Referees: Pedro Ortega (VEN), Miguel Aular (VEN)

23 June 2022; 19:40	Greece	2–1	Spain	Center court Referees: Dario Rupčić (CRO), Ivica Botinčan (CRO)
23 June 2022; 19:40	(27–26, 15–23, 14–12); Report			Center court Referees: Dario Rupčić (CRO), Ivica Botinčan (CRO)

24 June 2022; 18:00	Greece	2–1	Denmark	Center court Referees: Khalid Al-Hail (QAT), Ali Al-Yafei (QAT)
24 June 2022; 18:00	(27–14, 12–24, 8–6); Report			Center court Referees: Khalid Al-Hail (QAT), Ali Al-Yafei (QAT)

24 June 2022; 18:00	Thailand	1–2	Spain	Court 3 Referees: Mathieu Fanack (FRA), Cédric Daré (FRA)
24 June 2022; 18:00	(18–21, 20–17, 6–7); Report			Court 3 Referees: Mathieu Fanack (FRA), Cédric Daré (FRA)

24 June 2022; 18:00	Portugal	2–0	United States	Court 2 Referees: Dario Rupčić (CRO), Ivica Botinčan (CRO)
24 June 2022; 18:00	(16–14, 22–20); Report			Court 2 Referees: Dario Rupčić (CRO), Ivica Botinčan (CRO)

=== Group II ===
Pos	Team	Pld	W	L	Pts	SW	SL	SR	SPW	SPL	SPR	Qualification
1	Germany	5	5	0	10	10	0	MAX	220	137	1.606	Quarterfinals
2	Brazil	5	4	1	8	8	5	1.600	186	193	0.964	Quarterfinals
3	Netherlands	5	3	2	6	7	4	1.750	207	202	1.025	Quarterfinals
4	Argentina	5	2	3	4	4	7	0.571	170	171	0.994	Quarterfinals
5	Norway	5	1	4	2	4	8	0.500	203	232	0.875	
6	Uruguay	5	0	5	0	1	10	0.100	183	248	0.738	

Source: IHF
Rules for classification: 1) Points; 2) Head-to-head points; 3) Head-to-head set difference; 4) Head-to-head points won; 5) Set difference; 6) Points won; 7) Draw.

23 June 2022; 09:50	Netherlands	2–0	Norway	Center court Referees: Luciano Cardone (ITA), Sebatiano Manuele (ITA)
23 June 2022; 09:50	(20–18, 26–20); Report			Center court Referees: Luciano Cardone (ITA), Sebatiano Manuele (ITA)

23 June 2022; 09:50	Uruguay	0–2	Germany	Court 3 Referees: Mathieu Fanack (FRA), Cédric Daré (FRA)
23 June 2022; 09:50	(12–22, 14–24); Report			Court 3 Referees: Mathieu Fanack (FRA), Cédric Daré (FRA)

23 June 2022; 09:50	Argentina	0–2	Brazil	Court 2 Referees: Ana Barbosa (POR), Nádia Lemos (POR)
23 June 2022; 09:50	(20–21, 14–16); Report			Court 2 Referees: Ana Barbosa (POR), Nádia Lemos (POR)

23 June 2022; 15:30	Netherlands	1–2	Brazil	Center court Referees: Dario Rupčić (CRO), Ivica Botinčan (CRO)
23 June 2022; 15:30	(14–18, 19–14, 8–9); Report			Center court Referees: Dario Rupčić (CRO), Ivica Botinčan (CRO)

23 June 2022; 16:20	Argentina	0–2	Germany	Court 3 Referees: Mohamed Ben Salah (TUN), Mohamed Drissi (TUN)
23 June 2022; 16:20	(16–18, 15–19); Report			Court 3 Referees: Mohamed Ben Salah (TUN), Mohamed Drissi (TUN)

23 June 2022; 18:50	Uruguay	0–2	Norway	Center court Referees: Luciano Cardone (ITA), Sebatiano Manuele (ITA)
23 June 2022; 18:50	(18–24, 20–21); Report			Center court Referees: Luciano Cardone (ITA), Sebatiano Manuele (ITA)

24 June 2022; 15:30	Netherlands	0–2	Germany	Center court Referees: Ana Barbosa (POR), Nádia Lemos (POR)
24 June 2022; 15:30	(14–23, 14–26); Report			Center court Referees: Ana Barbosa (POR), Nádia Lemos (POR)

24 June 2022; 16:20	Argentina	2–1	Norway	Center court Referees: Sylwia Bartkowiak (POL), Weronika Łakomy (POL)
24 June 2022; 16:20	(28–24, 20–22, 8–4); Report			Center court Referees: Sylwia Bartkowiak (POL), Weronika Łakomy (POL)

24 June 2022; 17:10	Uruguay	1–2	Brazil	Center court Referees: Luciano Cardone (ITA), Sebatiano Manuele (ITA)
24 June 2022; 17:10	(12–22, 18–14, 6–8); Report			Center court Referees: Luciano Cardone (ITA), Sebatiano Manuele (ITA)

== Knockout stage ==
=== Bracket ===
Championship bracket

Quarter-finals
25 June
Greece	2
Argentina	1
25 June
Brazil	0
Spain	2
25 June
Denmark	1
Netherlands	2
25 June
Germany	2
Portugal	0

Semi-finals
25 June
Greece	0
Spain	2
25 June
Netherlands	0
Germany	2

Final
26 June
Spain	0
Germany	2
Third place
26 June
Greece	1
Netherlands	2

Fifth place bracket

5–8th place semifinals
25 June
Argentina	0
Brazil	2
25 June
Denmark	2
Portugal	1

Fifth place game
26 June
Brazil	1
Denmark	2
Seventh place game
26 June
Argentina	2
Portugal	0

9–16th place bracket

9–16th place quarterfinals
25 June
Norway	2
Australia	0
25 June
United States	0
Hungary	2
25 June
Thailand	2
Mexico	0
25 June
Uruguay	2
Vietnam	0

9–12th place semifinals
25 June
Norway	1
Hungary	2
25 June
Thailand	2
Uruguay	1

Ninth place game
26 June
Hungary	2
Thailand	0
Eleventh place game
26 June
Norway	2
Uruguay	1

13–16th place bracket

13–16th place semifinals
25 June
Australia	1
United States	2
25 June
Mexico	1
Vietnam	2

13th place game
26 June
United States	1
Vietnam	2
15th place game
26 June
Australia	0
Mexico	2

=== 9–16th place quarterfinals ===
25 June 2022; 09:00	United States	0–2	Hungary	Center court Referees: Pedro Ortega (VEN), Miguel Aular (VEN)
25 June 2022; 09:00	(20–30, 11–17); Report			Center court Referees: Pedro Ortega (VEN), Miguel Aular (VEN)

25 June 2022; 09:00	Norway	2–0	Australia	Court 3 Referees: Ana Barbosa (POR), Nádia Lemos (POR)
25 June 2022; 09:00	(26–8, 18–12); Report			Court 3 Referees: Ana Barbosa (POR), Nádia Lemos (POR)

25 June 2022; 09:00	Thailand	2–0	Mexico	Court 2 Referees: Mohamed Ben Salah (TUN), Mohamed Drissi (TUN)
25 June 2022; 09:00	(21–18, 21–18); Report			Court 2 Referees: Mohamed Ben Salah (TUN), Mohamed Drissi (TUN)

25 June 2022; 09:50	Uruguay	2–0	Vietnam	Court 2 Referees: Sylwia Bartkowiak (POL), Weronika Łakomy (POL)
25 June 2022; 09:50	(21–20, 21–16); Report			Court 2 Referees: Sylwia Bartkowiak (POL), Weronika Łakomy (POL)

=== Quarterfinals ===
25 June 2022; 12:20	Greece	2–1	Argentina	Center court Referees: Luciano Cardone (ITA), Sebatiano Manuele (ITA)
25 June 2022; 12:20	(22–33, 19–16, 8–6); Report			Center court Referees: Luciano Cardone (ITA), Sebatiano Manuele (ITA)

25 June 2022; 12:20	Spain	2–0	Brazil	Court 2 Referees: Ana Barbosa (POR), Nádia Lemos (POR)
25 June 2022; 12:20	(13–11, 18–16); Report			Court 2 Referees: Ana Barbosa (POR), Nádia Lemos (POR)

25 June 2022; 12:20	Portugal	0–2	Germany	Court 2 Referees: Sylwia Bartkowiak (POL), Weronika Łakomy (POL)
25 June 2022; 12:20	(12–20, 8–10); Report			Court 2 Referees: Sylwia Bartkowiak (POL), Weronika Łakomy (POL)

25 June 2022; 13:10	Denmark	1–2	Netherlands	Center court Referees: Sydiney Dos Santos (BRA), Flavio Asis (BRA)
25 June 2022; 13:10	(24–26, 25–24, 10–11); Report			Center court Referees: Sydiney Dos Santos (BRA), Flavio Asis (BRA)

=== 13–16th place semifinals ===
25 June 2022; 15:00	Australia	1–2	United States	Court 3 Referees: Mohamed Ben Salah (TUN), Mohamed Drissi (TUN)
25 June 2022; 15:00	(20–22, 16–10, 10–11); Report			Court 3 Referees: Mohamed Ben Salah (TUN), Mohamed Drissi (TUN)

25 June 2022; 15:50	Mexico	1–2	Vietnam	Court 2 Referees: Luciano Cardone (ITA), Sebatiano Manuele (ITA)
25 June 2022; 15:50	(23–20, 18–20, 2–3); Report			Court 2 Referees: Luciano Cardone (ITA), Sebatiano Manuele (ITA)

=== 9–12th place semifinals ===
25 June 2022; 15:00	Norway	1–2	Hungary	Center court Referees: Sylwia Bartkowiak (POL), Weronika Łakomy (POL)
25 June 2022; 15:00	(15–17, 20–15, 2–5); Report			Center court Referees: Sylwia Bartkowiak (POL), Weronika Łakomy (POL)

25 June 2022; 15:00	Thailand	2–1	Uruguay	Court 2 Referees: Ana Barbosa (POR), Nádia Lemos (POR)
25 June 2022; 15:00	(29–26, 22–23, 9–8); Report			Court 2 Referees: Ana Barbosa (POR), Nádia Lemos (POR)

=== 5–8th place semifinals ===
25 June 2022; 16:40	Argentina	0–2	Brazil	Center court Referees: Khalid Al-Hail (QAT), Ali Al-Yafei (QAT)
25 June 2022; 16:40	(18–19, 16–25); Report			Center court Referees: Khalid Al-Hail (QAT), Ali Al-Yafei (QAT)

25 June 2022; 19:10	Portugal	1–2	Denmark	Court 2 Referees: Johan Gomér (SWE), Martin Gomér (SWE)
25 June 2022; 19:10	(20–19, 14–21, 4–7); Report			Court 2 Referees: Johan Gomér (SWE), Martin Gomér (SWE)

=== Semifinals ===
25 June 2022; 19:10	Germany	2–0	Netherlands	Center court Referees: Ana Barbosa (POR), Nádia Lemos (POR)
25 June 2022; 19:10	(18–10, 25–16); Report			Center court Referees: Ana Barbosa (POR), Nádia Lemos (POR)

25 June 2022; 20:00	Greece	0–2	Spain	Center court Referees: Pedro Ortega (VEN), Miguel Aular (VEN)
25 June 2022; 20:00	(16–25, 4–17); Report			Center court Referees: Pedro Ortega (VEN), Miguel Aular (VEN)

=== 15th place game ===
26 June 2022; 10:20	Australia	0–2	Mexico	Court 3 Referees: Ana Barbosa (POR), Nádia Lemos (POR)
26 June 2022; 10:20	(13–17, 12–14); Report			Court 3 Referees: Ana Barbosa (POR), Nádia Lemos (POR)

=== 13th place game ===
26 June 2022; 12:00	United States	1–2	Vietnam	Court 3 Referees: Khalid Al-Hail (QAT), Ali Al-Yafei (QAT)
26 June 2022; 12:00	(20–21, 22–20, 12–13); Report			Court 3 Referees: Khalid Al-Hail (QAT), Ali Al-Yafei (QAT)

=== Eleventh place game ===
26 June 2022; 10:20	Norway	2–1	Uruguay	Court 2 Referees: Khalid Al-Hail (QAT), Ali Al-Yafei (QAT)
26 June 2022; 10:20	(20–21, 22–16, 16–14); Report			Court 2 Referees: Khalid Al-Hail (QAT), Ali Al-Yafei (QAT)

=== Ninth place game ===
26 June 2022; 12:00	Hungary	2–0	Thailand	Court 2 Referees: Ana Barbosa (POR), Nádia Lemos (POR)
26 June 2022; 12:00	(17–14, 17–12); Report			Court 2 Referees: Ana Barbosa (POR), Nádia Lemos (POR)

=== Seventh place game ===
26 June 2022; 10:20	Argentina	2–0	Portugal	Center court Referees: Luciano Cardone (ITA), Sebatiano Manuele (ITA)
26 June 2022; 10:20	(22–18, 18–16); Report			Center court Referees: Luciano Cardone (ITA), Sebatiano Manuele (ITA)

=== Fifth place game ===
26 June 2022; 12:00	Brazil	1–2	Denmark	Court 2 Referees: Mohamed Ben Salah (TUN), Mohamed Drissi (TUN)
26 June 2022; 12:00	(18–14, 16–20, 6–7); Report			Court 2 Referees: Mohamed Ben Salah (TUN), Mohamed Drissi (TUN)

=== Third place game ===
26 June 2022; 16:00	Greece	1–2	Netherlands	Center court Referees: Sydiney Dos Santos (BRA), Flavio Asis (BRA)
26 June 2022; 16:00	(22–23, 19–16, 8–9); Report			Center court Referees: Sydiney Dos Santos (BRA), Flavio Asis (BRA)

=== Final ===
26 June 2022; 18:00	Spain	0–2	Germany	Center court Referees: Dario Rupčić (CRO), Ivica Botinčan (CRO)
26 June 2022; 18:00	(14–15, 20–22); Report			Center court Referees: Dario Rupčić (CRO), Ivica Botinčan (CRO)

== Final ranking ==
Rank	Team
1st place, gold medalist(s)	Germany
2nd place, silver medalist(s)	Spain
3rd place, bronze medalist(s)	Netherlands
4	Greece
5	Denmark
6	Brazil
7	Argentina
8	Portugal
9	Hungary
10	Thailand
11	Norway
12	Uruguay
13	Vietnam
14	United States
15	Mexico
16	Australia

== Statistics and awards ==
=== Top goalscorers ===
Rank	Name	Points
1	(United States) Christine Mansour	164
2	(Norway) Marielle Martinsen	152
3	(Netherlands) Anna Buter	130
4	(Spain) María Batista	124
5	(Denmark) Line Gyldenløve Kristensen	121
6	(Portugal) Cristiana Morgado	117
7	(Hungary) Renáta Csiki	111
8	(Uruguay) Guillermina Rodríguez	104
9	(Netherlands) Meike Kruijer	103
10	(Thailand) Niphaphon Pansopa	102

Source: IHF

=== Top goalkeepers ===
Rank	Name	%	Saves	Shots
1	(Brazil) Juliana Xavier	48	16	33
2	(Spain) Patricia Encinas	40	74	187
3	(Germany) Katharina Filter	34	65	189
4	(Hungary) Gréta Hadfi	33	34	102
4	(Hungary) Dalma Mátéfi	33	43	132
6	(Greece) Magdalini Kepesidou	30	73	246
7	(Australia) Jemima Harbort	27	66	243
8	(Brazil) Ingrid de Souza	26	51	193
9	(Norway) Kathrine Sæthre	25	30	120
9	(United States) Emma Johnson	25	41	161

Source: IHF

=== Awards ===
The awards were announced on 26 June 2022.

Position	Player
Goalkeeper	(Spain) Patricia Encinas
Right wing	(Germany) Amelie Möllmann
Left wing	(Greece) Ntafini Dimitri
Specialist	(Argentina) Lucila Candela
Pivot	(Spain) Asuncion Batista
Defender	(Netherlands) Rianne Mol
MVP	(Spain) Asuncion Batista
Fair play award	Hungary
