= Netherlands women's national beach handball team =

Netherlands

Information
- Association: Netherlands Handball Association
- Coach: Peter Portengen
- Assistant coach: Léon Budé

Colours
Home	Away

Results

World Championship
- Appearances: 3 (First in 2022)
- Best result: 3rd (2022, 2024)
- Last updated on Unknown.

The women's national beach handball team is the national team of Netherlands. It is governed by the Netherlands Handball Association and takes part in international beach handball competitions.

== World Championship results ==
Year	Position
(Egypt) 2004	Did not qualify
(Brazil) 2006	Did not qualify
(Spain) 2008	Did not qualify
(Turkey) 2010	Did not qualify
(Oman) 2012	Did not qualify
(Brazil) 2014	Did not qualify
(Hungary) 2016	Did not qualify
(Russia) 2018	Did not qualify
(Italy) 2020	Cancelled
(Greece) 2022	3rd place
(China) 2024	3rd place
(Croatia) 2026	7th place
Total	3/11
