= 2024 Women's Beach Handball World Championships =

Tournament details
- Host country: China
- Venue(s): Pingtan Island, Fuzhou
- Dates: 18–23 June
- Teams: 16 (from 5 confederations)

Final positions
- Champions: Germany (2nd title)
- Runners-up: Argentina
- Third place: Netherlands
- Fourth place: Denmark

Tournament statistics
- Top scorer(s): (Brazil) Beatriz Cruz (170 points)

Awards
- Best player: (Denmark) Line Larsen
- Best goalkeeper: (Spain) Patricia Encinas

The 2024 Women's Beach Handball World Championships were tenth edition of the championship, held from 18 to 23 June 2024 in China, under the aegis of International Handball Federation (IHF). The championship was held at the Pingtan International Beach Sports Base at Long Wangtou Ocean Park in Fuzhou.

Germany won their second overall and consecutive title with a finals win over Argentina.

== Qualification ==
Qualification	Vacancies	Qualified
Host	1	China
Defending champion	1	Germany
Africa	1	~~Tunisia~~
2023 Asian Beach Handball Championship	2	Philippines; Vietnam
2023 European Beach Handball Championship	6	Denmark; Greece; Netherlands; Norway; Portugal; Spain
2023 Oceania Beach Handball Championship	1	Australia
2024 South and Central American Beach Handball Championship	2	Argentina; Brazil
2024 NACHC Beach Handball Championship	2	United States; Puerto Rico
Wildcard	1	Croatia

== Format ==
The 16 teams will be drawn into four groups of four teams each where they will play a round-robin. The top three teams will advance to the main round, consisting of two groups of six teams, facing the teams they have not met in the preliminary round. The first four teams advance to the quarterfinals, from where on a knockout stage will be played. The last-placed teams from the first round will play a consolation round.

== Draw ==
The draw took place on 3 May 2024.

=== Seeding ===
Pot 1	Pot 2	Pot 3	Pot 4
Germany; Netherlands; Spain; Portugal	Norway; China; Brazil; Argentina	Greece; Denmark; Vietnam; Philippines	United States; Puerto Rico; Australia; Croatia

== Preliminary round ==
All times are local (UTC+8).

=== Group A ===
Pos	Team	Pld	W	L	Pts	SW	SL	SR	SPW	SPL	SPR	Qualification
1	Portugal	3	3	0	6	6	1	6.000	114	63	1.810	Main round
2	Philippines	3	2	1	4	5	2	2.500	104	94	1.106	Main round
3	China (H)	3	1	2	2	2	5	0.400	79	101	0.782	Main round
4	Australia	3	0	3	0	1	6	0.167	72	111	0.649	Consolation round

Source: IHF
Rules for classification: 1) Points; 2) Head-to-head points; 3) Head-to-head set difference; 4) Head-to-head points won; 5) Set difference; 6) Points won; 7) Draw.
(H) Host

18 June 2024; 16:40	Portugal	2–1	Philippines	Court 4 Attendance: 50; Referees: Mathieu Fanack (FRA), Cédric Daré (FRA)
18 June 2024; 16:40	(18–19, 22–10, 6–5); Report			Court 4 Attendance: 50; Referees: Mathieu Fanack (FRA), Cédric Daré (FRA)

18 June 2024; 19:50	China	2–1	Australia	Central court Attendance: 600; Referees: Mery Diaz (ARG), Soledad Vignoni (ARG)
18 June 2024; 19:50	(14–20, 16–11, 7–6); Report			Central court Attendance: 600; Referees: Mery Diaz (ARG), Soledad Vignoni (ARG)

19 June 2024; 11:10	Philippines	2–0	China	Central court Attendance: 150; Referees: Jonas Primdahl (DEN), Nichlas Nygaard (DEN)
19 June 2024; 11:10	(13–11, 13–10); Report			Central court Attendance: 150; Referees: Jonas Primdahl (DEN), Nichlas Nygaard (DEN)

19 June 2024; 11:10	Australia	0–2	Portugal	Court 2 Attendance: 10; Referees: Mathieu Fanack (FRA), Cédric Daré (FRA)
19 June 2024; 11:10	(2–13, 6–17); Report			Court 2 Attendance: 10; Referees: Mathieu Fanack (FRA), Cédric Daré (FRA)

19 June 2024; 19:10	Portugal	2–0	China	Central court Attendance: 500; Referees: Soleyman Payda (IRI), Mohammad Kiani (IRI)
19 June 2024; 19:10	(18–14, 20–7); Report			Central court Attendance: 500; Referees: Soleyman Payda (IRI), Mohammad Kiani (IRI)

19 June 2024; 19:10	Philippines	2–0	Australia	Court 2 Attendance: 30; Referees: Sergio Martínez (ESP), Victor Rolland (ESP)
19 June 2024; 19:10	(20–16, 24–11); Report			Court 2 Attendance: 30; Referees: Sergio Martínez (ESP), Victor Rolland (ESP)

=== Group B ===
Pos	Team	Pld	W	L	Pts	SW	SL	SR	SPW	SPL	SPR	Qualification
1	Argentina	3	3	0	6	6	1	6.000	142	106	1.340	Main round
2	Spain	3	2	1	4	5	2	2.500	122	101	1.208	Main round
3	Croatia	3	1	2	2	2	4	0.500	106	126	0.841	Main round
4	Vietnam	3	0	3	0	0	6	0.000	96	133	0.722	Consolation round

Source: IHF
Rules for classification: 1) Points; 2) Head-to-head points; 3) Head-to-head set difference; 4) Head-to-head points won; 5) Set difference; 6) Points won; 7) Draw.

18 June 2024; 19:50	Spain	2–0	Vietnam	Court 2 Attendance: 10; Referees: José Galeano (PAR), José Rodrigues (PAR)
18 June 2024; 19:50	(26–14, 14–12); Report			Court 2 Attendance: 10; Referees: José Galeano (PAR), José Rodrigues (PAR)

18 June 2024; 20:40	Argentina	2–0	Croatia	Central court Attendance: 100; Referees: Cao Hongjun (CHN), Xu Jian (CHN)
18 June 2024; 20:40	(24–14, 26–16); Report			Central court Attendance: 100; Referees: Cao Hongjun (CHN), Xu Jian (CHN)

19 June 2024; 12:00	Vietnam	0–2	Argentina	Court 4 Attendance: 20; Referees: Bjarne Deiters (GER), Jesper Stumpfe (GER)
19 June 2024; 12:00	(14–20, 16–26); Report			Court 4 Attendance: 20; Referees: Bjarne Deiters (GER), Jesper Stumpfe (GER)

19 June 2024; 12:00	Croatia	0–2	Spain	Court 3 Attendance: 20; Referees: José Galeano (PAR), José Rodrigues (PAR)
19 June 2024; 12:00	(12–13, 17–23); Report			Court 3 Attendance: 20; Referees: José Galeano (PAR), José Rodrigues (PAR)

19 June 2024; 20:50	Vietnam	0–2	Croatia	Court 2 Attendance: 10; Referees: Cao Hongjun (CHN), Xu Jian (CHN)
19 June 2024; 20:50	(20–25, 20–22); Report			Court 2 Attendance: 10; Referees: Cao Hongjun (CHN), Xu Jian (CHN)

19 June 2024; 20:50	Spain	1–2	Argentina	Central court Attendance: 470; Referees: Coriana Constantin (ROU), Daniela-Andreea Enache (ROU)
19 June 2024; 20:50	(18–15, 20–21, 8–10); Report			Central court Attendance: 470; Referees: Coriana Constantin (ROU), Daniela-Andreea Enache (ROU)

=== Group C ===
Pos	Team	Pld	W	L	Pts	SW	SL	SR	SPW	SPL	SPR	Qualification
1	Denmark	3	3	0	6	6	1	6.000	127	107	1.187	Main round
2	Netherlands	3	2	1	4	5	3	1.667	154	105	1.467	Main round
3	Norway	3	1	2	2	3	4	0.750	111	135	0.822	Main round
4	United States	3	0	3	0	0	6	0.000	88	143	0.615	Consolation round

Source: IHF
Rules for classification: 1) Points; 2) Head-to-head points; 3) Head-to-head set difference; 4) Head-to-head points won; 5) Set difference; 6) Points won; 7) Draw.

18 June 2024; 15:50	Norway	2–0	United States	Court 2 Attendance: 20; Referees: Soleyman Payda (IRI), Mohammad Kiani (IRI)
18 June 2024; 15:50	(22–12, 25–20); Report			Court 2 Attendance: 20; Referees: Soleyman Payda (IRI), Mohammad Kiani (IRI)

18 June 2024; 15:50	Netherlands	1–2	Denmark	Central court Attendance: 200; Referees: Coriana Constantin (ROU), Daniela-Andreea Enache (ROU)
18 June 2024; 15:50	(16–17, 17–12, 14–16); Report			Central court Attendance: 200; Referees: Coriana Constantin (ROU), Daniela-Andreea Enache (ROU)

19 June 2024; 10:20	United States	0–2	Netherlands	Court 2 Attendance: 50; Referees: Mery Diaz (ARG), Soledad Vignoni (ARG)
19 June 2024; 10:20	(8–30, 6–20); Report			Court 2 Attendance: 50; Referees: Mery Diaz (ARG), Soledad Vignoni (ARG)

19 June 2024; 10:20	Denmark	2–0	Norway	Central court Attendance: 80; Referees: Sergio Martínez (ESP), Victor Rolland (ESP)
19 June 2024; 10:20	(21–10, 15–8); Report			Central court Attendance: 80; Referees: Sergio Martínez (ESP), Victor Rolland (ESP)

19 June 2024; 17:30	Denmark	2–0	United States	Court 2 Attendance: 80; Referees: Cao Hongjun (CHN), Xu Jian (CHN)
19 June 2024; 17:30	(18–16, 28–26); Report			Court 2 Attendance: 80; Referees: Cao Hongjun (CHN), Xu Jian (CHN)

19 June 2024; 17:30	Netherlands	2–1	Norway	Central court Attendance: 100; Referees: Bjarne Deiters (GER), Jesper Stumpfe (GER)
19 June 2024; 17:30	(18–20, 32–20, 7–6); Report			Central court Attendance: 100; Referees: Bjarne Deiters (GER), Jesper Stumpfe (GER)

=== Group D ===
Pos	Team	Pld	W	L	Pts	SW	SL	SR	SPW	SPL	SPR	Qualification
1	Brazil	3	3	0	6	6	1	6.000	120	71	1.690	Main round
2	Germany	3	2	1	4	5	2	2.500	140	102	1.373	Main round
3	Greece	3	1	2	2	2	4	0.500	103	104	0.990	Main round
4	Puerto Rico	3	0	3	0	0	6	0.000	60	146	0.411	Consolation round

Source: IHF
Rules for classification: 1) Points; 2) Head-to-head points; 3) Head-to-head set difference; 4) Head-to-head points won; 5) Set difference; 6) Points won; 7) Draw.

18 June 2024; 15:00	Germany	2–0	Greece	Court 3 Attendance: 55; Referees: Jonas Primdahl (DEN), Nichlas Nygaard (DEN)
18 June 2024; 15:00	(24–14, 22–20); Report			Court 3 Attendance: 55; Referees: Jonas Primdahl (DEN), Nichlas Nygaard (DEN)

18 June 2024; 15:00	Brazil	2–0	Puerto Rico	Court 4 Attendance: 50; Referees: Cao Hongjun (CHN), Xu Jian (CHN)
18 June 2024; 15:00	(22–6, 20–6); Report			Court 4 Attendance: 50; Referees: Cao Hongjun (CHN), Xu Jian (CHN)

19 June 2024; 10:20	Puerto Rico	0–2	Germany	Court 3 Attendance: 10; Referees: José Galeano (PAR), José Rodrigues (PAR)
19 June 2024; 10:20	(12–30, 6–22); Report			Court 3 Attendance: 10; Referees: José Galeano (PAR), José Rodrigues (PAR)

19 June 2024; 10:20	Greece	0–2	Brazil	Court 4 Attendance: 10; Referees: Soleyman Payda (IRI), Mohammad Kiani (IRI)
19 June 2024; 10:20	(10–16, 7–12); Report			Court 4 Attendance: 10; Referees: Soleyman Payda (IRI), Mohammad Kiani (IRI)

19 June 2024; 16:40	Germany	1–2	Brazil	Central court Attendance: 130; Referees: Jonas Primdahl (DEN), Nichlas Nygaard (DEN)
19 June 2024; 16:40	(24–20, 14–23, 4–7); Report			Central court Attendance: 130; Referees: Jonas Primdahl (DEN), Nichlas Nygaard (DEN)

19 June 2024; 16:40	Greece	2–0	Puerto Rico	Court 2 Attendance: 20; Referees: Sergio Martínez (ESP), Victor Rolland (ESP)
19 June 2024; 16:40	(28–20, 24–10); Report			Court 2 Attendance: 20; Referees: Sergio Martínez (ESP), Victor Rolland (ESP)

== Consolation round ==
Pos	Team	Pld	W	L	Pts	SW	SL	SR	SPW	SPL	SPR
1	Vietnam	3	3	0	6	6	0	MAX	160	107	1.495
2	United States	3	2	1	4	4	3	1.333	132	132	1.000
3	Australia	3	1	2	2	3	4	0.750	102	128	0.797
4	Puerto Rico	3	0	3	0	0	6	0.000	98	125	0.784

Source: IHF
Rules for classification: 1) Points; 2) Head-to-head points; 3) Head-to-head set difference; 4) Head-to-head points won; 5) Set difference; 6) Points won; 7) Draw.

20 June 2024; 16:30	Australia	1–2	United States	Court 3 Attendance: 70; Referees: José Galeano (PAR), José Rodrigues (PAR)
20 June 2024; 16:30	(17–18, 21–18, 4–6); Report			Court 3 Attendance: 70; Referees: José Galeano (PAR), José Rodrigues (PAR)

20 June 2024; 16:30	Vietnam	2–0	Puerto Rico	Court 2 Attendance: 10; Referees: Cao Hongjun (CHN), Xu Jian (CHN)
20 June 2024; 16:30	(18–12, 30–22); Report			Court 2 Attendance: 10; Referees: Cao Hongjun (CHN), Xu Jian (CHN)

21 June 2024; 09:30	United States	0–2	Vietnam	Court 4 Attendance: 20; Referees: Cao Hongjun (CHN), Xu Jian (CHN)
21 June 2024; 09:30	(22–25, 26–29); Report			Court 4 Attendance: 20; Referees: Cao Hongjun (CHN), Xu Jian (CHN)

21 June 2024; 09:30	Puerto Rico	0–2	Australia	Court 3 Attendance: 10; Referees: Mery Diaz (ARG), Soledad Vignoni (ARG)
21 June 2024; 09:30	(10–16, 18–19); Report			Court 3 Attendance: 10; Referees: Mery Diaz (ARG), Soledad Vignoni (ARG)

21 June 2024; 16:30	United States	2–0	Puerto Rico	Court 3 Attendance: 10; Referees: Cao Hongjun (CHN), Xu Jian (CHN)
21 June 2024; 16:30	(22–18, 20–18); Report			Court 3 Attendance: 10; Referees: Cao Hongjun (CHN), Xu Jian (CHN)

21 June 2024; 17:20	Australia	0–2	Vietnam	Court 2 Attendance: 28; Referees: Coriana Constantin (ROU), Daniela-Andreea Enache (ROU)
21 June 2024; 17:20	(14–30, 11–28); Report			Court 2 Attendance: 28; Referees: Coriana Constantin (ROU), Daniela-Andreea Enache (ROU)

== Main round ==
Points obtained against teams from the same group are carried over.

=== Group I ===
Pos	Team	Pld	W	L	Pts	SW	SL	SR	SPW	SPL	SPR	Qualification
1	Argentina	5	5	0	10	10	1	10.000	244	158	1.544	Quarterfinals
2	Spain	5	4	1	8	9	2	4.500	210	148	1.419	Quarterfinals
3	Portugal	5	3	2	6	6	6	1.000	181	183	0.989	Quarterfinals
4	Croatia	5	2	3	4	5	7	0.714	186	188	0.989	Quarterfinals
5	Philippines	5	1	4	2	3	8	0.375	141	198	0.712	
6	China (H)	5	0	5	0	1	10	0.100	121	208	0.582	

Source: IHF
Rules for classification: 1) Points; 2) Head-to-head points; 3) Head-to-head set difference; 4) Head-to-head points won; 5) Set difference; 6) Points won; 7) Draw.
(H) Host

20 June 2024; 17:20	Philippines	0–2	Spain	Court 4 Attendance: 20; Referees: Mathieu Fanack (FRA), Cédric Daré (FRA)
20 June 2024; 17:20	(10–22, 16–21); Report			Court 4 Attendance: 20; Referees: Mathieu Fanack (FRA), Cédric Daré (FRA)

20 June 2024; 17:20	Portugal	2–1	Croatia	Court 3 Attendance: 20; Referees: Soleyman Payda (IRI), Mohammad Kiani (IRI)
20 June 2024; 17:20	(16–10, 12–20, 7–6); Report			Court 3 Attendance: 20; Referees: Soleyman Payda (IRI), Mohammad Kiani (IRI)

20 June 2024; 18:10	China	0–2	Argentina	Central court Attendance: 200; Referees: José Galeano (PAR), José Rodrigues (PAR)
20 June 2024; 18:10	(8–29, 8–29); Report			Central court Attendance: 200; Referees: José Galeano (PAR), José Rodrigues (PAR)

21 June 2024; 10:20	Philippines	0–2	Argentina	Court 4 Attendance: 10; Referees: Jonas Primdahl (DEN), Nichlas Nygaard (DEN)
21 June 2024; 10:20	(16–20, 12–23); Report			Court 4 Attendance: 10; Referees: Jonas Primdahl (DEN), Nichlas Nygaard (DEN)

21 June 2024; 11:10	Portugal	0–2	Spain	Court 4 Attendance: 4 Referees: Bjarne Deiters (GER), Jesper Stumpfe (GER)
21 June 2024; 11:10	(10–28, 14–17); Report			Court 4 Attendance: 4 Referees: Bjarne Deiters (GER), Jesper Stumpfe (GER)

21 June 2024; 11:10	China	1–2	Croatia	Court 2 Attendance: 50; Referees: Soleyman Payda (IRI), Mohammad Kiani (IRI)
21 June 2024; 11:10	(18–20, 18–16, 4–10); Report			Court 2 Attendance: 50; Referees: Soleyman Payda (IRI), Mohammad Kiani (IRI)

21 June 2024; 18:10	Portugal	0–2	Argentina	Court 2 Attendance: 10; Referees: Mathieu Fanack (FRA), Cédric Daré (FRA)
21 June 2024; 18:10	(20–25, 18–22); Report			Court 2 Attendance: 10; Referees: Mathieu Fanack (FRA), Cédric Daré (FRA)

21 June 2024; 18:10	China	0–2	Spain	Central court Attendance: 300; Referees: José Galeano (PAR), José Rodrigues (PAR)
21 June 2024; 18:10	(10–24, 13–16); Report			Central court Attendance: 300; Referees: José Galeano (PAR), José Rodrigues (PAR)

21 June 2024; 18:10	Philippines	0–2	Croatia	Court 3 Attendance: 30; Referees: Jonas Primdahl (DEN), Nichlas Nygaard (DEN)
21 June 2024; 18:10	(15–24, 12–21); Report			Court 3 Attendance: 30; Referees: Jonas Primdahl (DEN), Nichlas Nygaard (DEN)

=== Group II ===
Pos	Team	Pld	W	L	Pts	SW	SL	SR	SPW	SPL	SPR	Qualification
1	Denmark	5	5	0	10	10	2	5.000	215	171	1.257	Quarterfinals
2	Netherlands	5	3	2	6 (Note: Netherlands 2 Pts, +1 SD; Germany ±0 SD; Brazil 2 Pts, −1 SD.)	8	6	1.333	243	215	1.130	Quarterfinals
3	Germany	5	3	2	6	7	6	1.167	212	211	1.005	Quarterfinals
4	Brazil	5	3	2	6	7	6	1.167	211	198	1.066	Quarterfinals
5	Greece	5	1	4	2	3	9	0.333	179	226	0.792	
6	Norway	5	0	5	0	4	10	0.400	209	248	0.843	

Source: IHF
Rules for classification: 1) Points; 2) Head-to-head points; 3) Head-to-head set difference; 4) Head-to-head points won; 5) Set difference; 6) Points won; 7) Draw.
Notes:

20 June 2024; 19:00	Norway	1–2	Brazil	Court 2 Attendance: 60; Referees: Mathieu Fanack (FRA), Cédric Daré (FRA)
20 June 2024; 19:00	(20–18, 20–23, 6–7); Report			Court 2 Attendance: 60; Referees: Mathieu Fanack (FRA), Cédric Daré (FRA)

20 June 2024; 19:50	Denmark	2–0	Greece	Central court Attendance: 600; Referees: Soleyman Payda (IRI), Mohammad Kiani (IRI)
20 June 2024; 19:50	(23–18, 25–16); Report			Central court Attendance: 600; Referees: Soleyman Payda (IRI), Mohammad Kiani (IRI)

20 June 2024; 20:40	Netherlands	1–2	Germany	Central court Attendance: 550; Referees: Coriana Constantin (ROU), Daniela-Andreea Enache (ROU)
20 June 2024; 20:40	(18–16, 18–20, 4–5); Report			Central court Attendance: 550; Referees: Coriana Constantin (ROU), Daniela-Andreea Enache (ROU)

21 June 2024; 12:00	Netherlands	2–0	Brazil	Central court Attendance: 50; Referees: Coriana Constantin (ROU), Daniela-Andreea Enache (ROU)
21 June 2024; 12:00	(28–24, 20–19); Report			Central court Attendance: 50; Referees: Coriana Constantin (ROU), Daniela-Andreea Enache (ROU)

21 June 2024; 12:00	Denmark	2–0	Germany	Court 3 Attendance: 30; Referees: Sergio Martínez (ESP), Victor Rolland (ESP)
21 June 2024; 12:00	(20–18, 21–12); Report			Court 3 Attendance: 30; Referees: Sergio Martínez (ESP), Victor Rolland (ESP)

21 June 2024; 12:00	Norway	1–2	Greece	Court 4 Attendance: 9 Referees: Mery Diaz (ARG), Soledad Vignoni (ARG)
21 June 2024; 12:00	(20–24, 21–16, 12–14); Report			Court 4 Attendance: 9 Referees: Mery Diaz (ARG), Soledad Vignoni (ARG)

21 June 2024; 19:50	Denmark	2–1	Brazil	Central court Attendance: 600; Referees: Mathieu Fanack (FRA), Cédric Daré (FRA)
21 June 2024; 19:50	(14–16, 22–20, 9–6); Report			Central court Attendance: 600; Referees: Mathieu Fanack (FRA), Cédric Daré (FRA)

21 June 2024; 19:50	Netherlands	2–1	Greece	Court 2 Attendance: 20; Referees: Mery Diaz (ARG), Soledad Vignoni (ARG)
21 June 2024; 19:50	(24–12, 24–26, 3–2); Report			Court 2 Attendance: 20; Referees: Mery Diaz (ARG), Soledad Vignoni (ARG)

21 June 2024; 20:40	Norway	1–2	Germany	Central court Attendance: 400; Referees: Sergio Martínez (ESP), Victor Rolland (ESP)
21 June 2024; 20:40	(24–22, 18–23, 4–8); Report			Central court Attendance: 400; Referees: Sergio Martínez (ESP), Victor Rolland (ESP)

== Knockout stage ==
=== Bracket ===
Championship bracket

Quarter-finals
22 June
Argentina	2
Brazil	1
22 June
Netherlands	2
Portugal	0
22 June
Denmark	2
Croatia	0
22 June
Spain	1
Germany	2

Semi-finals
22 June
Argentina	2
Netherlands	1
22 June
Denmark	1
Germany	2

Final
23 June
Argentina	0
Germany	2
Third place
23 June
Netherlands	2
Denmark	0

Fifth place bracket

5–8th place semifinals
22 June
Brazil	1
Portugal	2
22 June
Croatia	0
Spain	2

Fifth place game
23 June
Portugal	0
Spain	2
Seventh place game
23 June
Brazil	1
Croatia	2

9–16th place bracket

9–16th place quarterfinals
22 June
Philippines	2
Puerto Rico	0
22 June
China	0
Vietnam	2
22 June
Greece	2
Australia	0
22 June
Norway	2
United States	0

9–12th place semifinals
22 June
Philippines	1
Vietnam	2
22 June
Greece	2
Norway	1

Ninth place game
23 June
Vietnam	2
Greece	1
Eleventh place game
23 June
Philippines	0
Norway	2

13–16th place bracket

13–16th place semifinals
22 June
Puerto Rico	0
China	2
22 June
Australia	2
United States	0

13th place game
23 June
China	1
Australia	2
15th place game
23 June
Puerto Rico	2
United States	0

=== 9–16th place quarterfinals ===
22 June 2024; 09:30	China	0–2	Vietnam	Central court Attendance: 50; Referees: Soleyman Payda (IRI), Mohammad Kiani (IRI)
22 June 2024; 09:30	(18–28, 14–20); Report			Central court Attendance: 50; Referees: Soleyman Payda (IRI), Mohammad Kiani (IRI)

22 June 2024; 09:30	Norway	2–0	United States	Court 3 Attendance: 20; Referees: Cao Hongjun (CHN), Xu Jian (CHN)
22 June 2024; 09:30	(17–14, 24–14); Report			Court 3 Attendance: 20; Referees: Cao Hongjun (CHN), Xu Jian (CHN)

22 June 2024; 09:30	Philippines	2–0	Puerto Rico	Court 4 Attendance: 20; Referees: Mery Diaz (ARG), Soledad Vignoni (ARG)
22 June 2024; 09:30	(16–8, 18–16); Report			Court 4 Attendance: 20; Referees: Mery Diaz (ARG), Soledad Vignoni (ARG)

22 June 2024; 09:30	Greece	2–0	Australia	Court 2 Attendance: 10; Referees: Coriana Constantin (ROU), Daniela-Andreea Enache (ROU)
22 June 2024; 09:30	(26–14, 28–8); Report			Court 2 Attendance: 10; Referees: Coriana Constantin (ROU), Daniela-Andreea Enache (ROU)

=== Quarterfinals ===
22 June 2024; 11:10	Argentina	2–1	Brazil	Court 2 Attendance: 30; Referees: Sergio Martínez (ESP), Victor Rolland (ESP)
22 June 2024; 11:10	(18–19, 26–18, 13–12); Report			Court 2 Attendance: 30; Referees: Sergio Martínez (ESP), Victor Rolland (ESP)

22 June 2024; 11:10	Denmark	2–0	Croatia	Central court Attendance: 60; Referees: Coriana Constantin (ROU), Daniela-Andreea Enache (ROU)
22 June 2024; 11:10	(27–22, 22–18); Report			Central court Attendance: 60; Referees: Coriana Constantin (ROU), Daniela-Andreea Enache (ROU)

22 June 2024; 11:10	Netherlands	2–0	Portugal	Court 4 Attendance: 30; Referees: Mery Diaz (ARG), Soledad Vignoni (ARG)
22 June 2024; 11:10	(28–18, 24–20); Report			Court 4 Attendance: 30; Referees: Mery Diaz (ARG), Soledad Vignoni (ARG)

22 June 2024; 11:10	Spain	1–2	Germany	Court 3 Attendance: 30; Referees: Soleyman Payda (IRI), Mohammad Kiani (IRI)
22 June 2024; 11:10	(17–12, 18–19, 10–12); Report			Court 3 Attendance: 30; Referees: Soleyman Payda (IRI), Mohammad Kiani (IRI)

=== 13–16th place semifinals ===
22 June 2024; 16:00	Australia	2–0	United States	Court 4 Referees: Mery Diaz (ARG), Soledad Vignoni (ARG)
22 June 2024; 16:00	(23–16, 22–13); Report			Court 4 Referees: Mery Diaz (ARG), Soledad Vignoni (ARG)

22 June 2024; 16:00	Puerto Rico	0–2	China	Court 3 Attendance: 20; Referees: Jonas Primdahl (DEN), Nichlas Nygaard (DEN)
22 June 2024; 16:00	(22–24, 20–25); Report			Court 3 Attendance: 20; Referees: Jonas Primdahl (DEN), Nichlas Nygaard (DEN)

=== 9–12th place semifinals ===
22 June 2024; 16:00	Greece	2–1	Norway	Court 2 Attendance: 100; Referees: José Galeano (PAR), José Rodrigues (PAR)
22 June 2024; 16:00	(25–16, 22–23, 8–6); Report			Court 2 Attendance: 100; Referees: José Galeano (PAR), José Rodrigues (PAR)

22 June 2024; 16:00	Philippines	1–2	Vietnam	Central court Attendance: 10; Referees: Cao Hongjun (CHN), Xu Jian (CHN)
22 June 2024; 16:00	(20–24, 24–20, 4–7); Report			Central court Attendance: 10; Referees: Cao Hongjun (CHN), Xu Jian (CHN)

=== 5–8th place semifinals ===
22 June 2024; 17:40	Croatia	0–2	Spain	Court 3 Attendance: 20; Referees: Mery Diaz (ARG), Soledad Vignoni (ARG)
22 June 2024; 17:40	(14–25, 17–27); Report			Court 3 Attendance: 20; Referees: Mery Diaz (ARG), Soledad Vignoni (ARG)

22 June 2024; 17:40	Brazil	1–2	Portugal	Court 2 Attendance: 40; Referees: Cao Hongjun (CHN), Xu Jian (CHN)
22 June 2024; 17:40	(28–24, 20–23, 10–12); Report			Court 2 Attendance: 40; Referees: Cao Hongjun (CHN), Xu Jian (CHN)

=== Semifinals ===
22 June 2024; 17:40	Denmark	1–2	Germany	Central court Attendance: 300; Referees: José Galeano (PAR), José Rodrigues (PAR)
22 June 2024; 17:40	(22–25, 21–20, 8–9); Report			Central court Attendance: 300; Referees: José Galeano (PAR), José Rodrigues (PAR)

22 June 2024; 18:30	Argentina	2–1	Netherlands	Central court Attendance: 300; Referees: Coriana Constantin (ROU), Daniela-Andreea Enache (ROU)
22 June 2024; 18:30	(14–19, 27–20, 8–6); Report			Central court Attendance: 300; Referees: Coriana Constantin (ROU), Daniela-Andreea Enache (ROU)

=== 15th place game ===
23 June 2024; 10:20	Puerto Rico	2–0	United States	Court 4 Attendance: 20; Referees: Coriana Constantin (ROU), Daniela-Andreea Enache (ROU)
23 June 2024; 10:20	(15–12, 19–16); Report			Court 4 Attendance: 20; Referees: Coriana Constantin (ROU), Daniela-Andreea Enache (ROU)

=== 13th place game ===
23 June 2024; 10:20	China	1–2	Australia	Court 3 Attendance: 70; Referees: Mery Diaz (ARG), Soledad Vignoni (ARG)
23 June 2024; 10:20	(18–20, 21–18, 4–7); Report			Court 3 Attendance: 70; Referees: Mery Diaz (ARG), Soledad Vignoni (ARG)

=== Eleventh place game ===
23 June 2024; 11:10	Philippines	0–2	Norway	Court 3 Attendance: 10; Referees: José Galeano (PAR), José Rodrigues (PAR)
23 June 2024; 11:10	(6–13, 16–18); Report			Court 3 Attendance: 10; Referees: José Galeano (PAR), José Rodrigues (PAR)

=== Ninth place game ===
23 June 2024; 11:10	Vietnam	2–1	Greece	Court 2 Attendance: 10; Referees: Sergio Martínez (ESP), Victor Rolland (ESP)
23 June 2024; 11:10	(30–28, 24–32, 8–6); Report			Court 2 Attendance: 10; Referees: Sergio Martínez (ESP), Victor Rolland (ESP)

=== Seventh place game ===
23 June 2024; 10:20	Brazil	1–2	Croatia	Central court Attendance: 100; Referees: Cao Hongjun (CHN), Xu Jian (CHN)
23 June 2024; 10:20	(15–20, 26–18, 10–12); Report			Central court Attendance: 100; Referees: Cao Hongjun (CHN), Xu Jian (CHN)

=== Fifth place game ===
23 June 2024; 12:00	Portugal	0–2	Spain	Central court Attendance: 60; Referees: Coriana Constantin (ROU), Daniela-Andreea Enache (ROU)
23 June 2024; 12:00	(16–18, 8–18); Report			Central court Attendance: 60; Referees: Coriana Constantin (ROU), Daniela-Andreea Enache (ROU)

=== Third place game ===
23 June 2024; 16:30	Netherlands	2–0	Denmark	Central court Attendance: 200; Referees: Soleyman Payda (IRI), Mohammad Kiani (IRI)
23 June 2024; 16:30	(19–18, 22–20); Report			Central court Attendance: 200; Referees: Soleyman Payda (IRI), Mohammad Kiani (IRI)

=== Final ===
23 June 2024; 18:30	Argentina	0–2	Germany	Central court Attendance: 1,000; Referees: Mathieu Fanack (FRA), Cédric Daré (FRA)
23 June 2024; 18:30	(16–24, 18–21); Report			Central court Attendance: 1,000; Referees: Mathieu Fanack (FRA), Cédric Daré (FRA)

== Final ranking ==
Rank	Team
1st place, gold medalist(s)	Germany
2nd place, silver medalist(s)	Argentina
3rd place, bronze medalist(s)	Netherlands
4	Denmark
5	Spain
6	Portugal
7	Croatia
8	Brazil
9	Vietnam
10	Greece
11	Norway
12	Philippines
13	Australia
14	China
15	Puerto Rico
16	United States

== Statistics and awards ==
=== Top goalscorers ===
Rank	Name	Points
1	(Brazil) Beatriz Cruz	170
2	(Netherlands) Anna Buter	163
3	(United States) Christine Mansour	138
4	(Argentina) Gisella Bonomi	128
5	(Germany) Isabel Kattner	126
6	(Croatia) Anja Vida Lukšić	122
7	(Philippines) Nathalia Prado	120
8	(Spain) María Batista	117
9	(Argentina) Agustina Mirotta	112
10	(Australia) Allira Hudson-Gofers	112

Source: IHF

=== Top goalkeepers ===
Rank	Name	%	Saves	Shots
1	(Spain) Patricia Encinas	40	64	160
2	(Denmark) Freja Fagerberg	32	35	109
3	(Australia) Jemima Harbort	32	55	172
4	(Denmark) Mathilde Johansen	31	39	127
5	(Germany) Nele Kurzke	30	58	191
6	(China) Xu Shiyuan	30	56	189
7	(Norway) Victoria Berg	29	29	99
8	(Netherlands) Lisanne Bakker	28	32	114
9	(Greece) Magdalini Kepesidou	28	75	270
10	(Brazil) Ingrid de Souza	27	64	233

Source: IHF

=== Awards ===
The awards were announced on 23 June 2024.

Position	Player
MVP	(Denmark) Line Larsen
Goalkeeper	(Spain) Patricia Encinas
Right wing	(Netherlands) Meike Kruijer
Left wing	(Argentina) Fiorella Corimberto
Specialist	(Argentina) Lucila Balsas
Pivot	(Germany) Isabel Kattner
Defender	(Germany) Lucie-Marie Kretzschmar
Fair play award	Spain
