= Spain women's national beach handball team =

Spain

Information
- Association: Royal Spanish Handball Federation
- Coach: Juan Morillo
- Assistant coach: Noelia Delfa

Colours
| Home | Away |

Results

World Championship
- Appearances: 8 (First in 2008)
- Best result: 1st (2016)
- Last updated on Unknown.

Spain women's national beach handball team
Medal record

World Championship
| Gold medal – first place | 2016 Hungary | |
| Silver medal – second place | 2008 Spain | |
| Silver medal – second place | 2022 Greece | |
| Bronze medal – third place | 2026 Croatia | |

The Spain women's national beach handball team is the national team of Spain. It is governed by the Royal Spanish Handball Federation and takes part in international beach handball competitions.

== World Championships results ==
- 2008 – 2nd place
- 2010 – 9th place
- 2014 – 5th place
- 2016 – 1st place
- 2018 – 4th place
- 2022 – 2nd place
- 2024 – 5th place
- 2026 – 3rd place
