= 2022 in sports by month =

2022 in sports describes the year's events in world sport.

== Calendar by month ==
Note: Sports that were originally intended to take place in 2020 and/or 2021 but were delayed due to the COVID-19 pandemic are indicated using †.

=== January ===
Date	Sport	Venue/Event	Status	Winner/s
8 December 2021–18	Cricket	(Australia) 2021–22 Ashes series	International	Australia
15 December 2021–3	Darts	(England) 2022 PDC World Darts Championship	International	(Scotland) Peter Wright
26 December 2021–5	Ice hockey	(Canada) 2022 World Junior Ice Hockey Championships	International	Cancelled
28 December 2021–4	Cross-country skiing	(Switzerland) / (Germany) / (Italy) 2021–22 Tour de Ski	International	Men's: (Norway) Johannes Høsflot Klæbo; Women's: (Russia) Natalya Nepryayeva
28 December 2021–6	Ski jumping	(Germany) / (Austria) 2021–22 Four Hills Tournament	International	(Japan) Ryōyū Kobayashi
1	Ice hockey	(United States) 2022 NHL Winter Classic	Domestic	(Missouri) St. Louis Blues
1–9	Darts	(England) 2022 WDF World Darts Championship	International	Postponed to 2–10 April
1–9	Tennis	(Australia) 2022 ATP Cup	International	Canada
2–14	Rally raid	(Saudi Arabia) 2022 Dakar Rally (WRRC #1)	International	Bikes: (United Kingdom) Sam Sunderland; Quads: (France) Alexandre Giroud; Cars: (Qatar) Nasser Al-Attiyah; Light Proto: (Chile) Francisco López Contardo; SSV: (United States) Austin Jones; Trucks: Dmitry Sotnikov
5–20	Draughts	(Netherlands) 2022 World Draughts Championship match	International	(Netherlands) Roel Boomstra
7–9	Fistball	(Switzerland) 2022 Men's European Indoor Fistball Championship	Continental	(Germany) TSV Pfungstadt
7–9	Fistball	(Germany) 2022 Women's European Indoor Fistball Championship	Continental	(Germany) TSV Dennach
7–9	Speed skating	(Netherlands) 2022 European Speed Skating Championships	Continental	Netherlands
7–23	Bowls	(England) 2022 World Indoor Bowls Championship	International	Open: (England) Les Gillett; Women: (England) Katherine Rednall
8–23	Multi-sport	(Norway) 2021 World Para Snow Sports Championships	International	RPC
9–16	Snooker	(England) 2022 Masters (Triple Crown #2)	International	(Australia) Neil Robertson
9–6 February	Association football	(Cameroon) 2021 Africa Cup of Nations^{†}	Continental	Senegal
10	American football	(United States) 2022 College Football Playoff National Championship	Domestic	(Georgia (U.S. state)) Georgia Bulldogs
10–16	Figure skating	(Estonia) 2022 European Figure Skating Championships	Continental	Russia
12–15	Indoor hockey	(Germany) 2022 Women's EuroHockey Indoor Championship	Continental	Postponed to 7–11 December 2022
13–16	Indoor hockey	(Germany) 2022 Men's EuroHockey Indoor Championship	Continental	Postponed to 7–11 December 2022
13–23	Handball	(Morocco) 2022 African Men's Handball Championship	Continental	Postponed to 22 June – 2 July 2022
13–30	Handball	(Hungary) / (Slovakia) 2022 European Men's Handball Championship	Continental	Sweden
14–16	Bobsleigh & skeleton	(Switzerland) IBSF European Championships 2022	Continental	Germany
14–16	Indoor hockey	(Portugal) 2022 Men's EuroHockey Indoor Championship II	Continental	Spain
14–16	Indoor hockey	(Cyprus) 2022 Men's EuroHockey Indoor Championship III	Continental	Postponed to December 2022
14–16	Short track speed skating	(United States) 2022 Four Continents Short Track Speed Skating Championships	International	Cancelled
14–16	Short track speed skating	(Germany) 2022 European Short Track Speed Skating Championships	Continental	Cancelled
14–5 February	Cricket	(Antigua and Barbuda) / (Guyana) / (Saint Kitts and Nevis) / (Trinidad and Tobago) 2022 ICC Under-19 Cricket World Cup	International	India
15–16	Luge	(Austria) 2022 FIL Junior European Luge Championships	Continental	Germany
16–7 February	Association football	(Algeria) 2022 African Nations Championship	Continental	Postponed to January 2023
17–23	Field hockey	(Ghana) 2022 Men's Hockey Africa Cup of Nations (Ghana) 2022 Women's Hockey Africa Cup of Nations	Continental	Men: South Africa; Women: South Africa
17–30	Tennis	(Australia) 2022 Australian Open	International	Men: (Spain) Rafael Nadal; Women: (Australia) Ashleigh Barty
18–31	Handball	(Saudi Arabia) 2022 Asian Men's Handball Championship	Continental	Qatar
19–23	Biathlon	(Slovenia) 2022 IBU Junior Open European Championships	Continental	France
19–29	Field hockey	(Chile) 2022 Women's Pan American Cup	Continental	Argentina
19–6 February	Futsal	(Netherlands) UEFA Futsal Euro 2022	Continental	Portugal
20–23	Figure skating	(Estonia) 2022 Four Continents Figure Skating Championships	International	United States
20–23	Rallying	(Monaco) 2022 Monte Carlo Rally (WRC #1)	International	WRC: (France) Sébastien Loeb & (France) Isabelle Galmiche ( (United Kingdom) M-Sport Ford WRT); WRC-2: (Norway) Andreas Mikkelsen & (Norway) Torstein Eriksen ( (Germany) Toksport WRT); WRC-3: (Finland) Sami Pajari & (Finland) Enni Mälkönen
20–30	Field hockey	(Chile) 2022 Men's Pan American Cup	Continental	Argentina
20–6 February	Association football	(India) 2022 AFC Women's Asian Cup	Continental	China
21–23	Bobsleigh & skeleton	(Austria) IBSF Junior World Championships 2022	International	Germany
21–23	Indoor hockey	(Spain) 2022 Women's EuroHockey Indoor Championship II	Continental	Spain
21–23	Indoor hockey	(Slovakia) 2022 Women's EuroHockey Indoor Championship III	Continental	Postponed to December 2022
21–23	Multi-sport	(United States) Winter X Games XXVI	International	New Zealand
21–28	Field hockey	(Oman) 2022 Women's Hockey Asia Cup	Continental	Japan
22–23	Luge	(Switzerland) 2022 FIL European Luge Championships	Continental	Germany
22–28	Multi-sport	(Russia) 2022 Special Olympics World Winter Games	International	Postponed to January 2023
25–29	Handball	(Brazil) 2022 South and Central American Men's Handball Championship	Continental	Brazil
26–29	Ice climbing	(Switzerland) 2022 UIAA Ice Climbing World Championships	International	Russian Mountaineering Federation
26–30	Biathlon	(Germany) 2022 IBU Open European Championships	Continental	Norway
28–29	Formula racing	(Saudi Arabia) 2022 Diriyah ePrix (FE #1/2)	International	Race 1: (Netherlands) Nyck de Vries ( (Germany) Mercedes-EQ); Race 2: (Switzerland) Edoardo Mortara ( (Italy) ROKiT Venturi Racing)
28–29	Luge	(Germany) 2022 Junior World Luge Championships	International	Germany
28–30	Canoeing	(Australia) 2022 Oceania Canoe Slalom Championships	Continental	Australia
28–30	Darts	(England) 2022 Masters	International	(England) Joe Cullen
28–30	Speed skating	(Austria) 2022 World Junior Speed Skating Championships	International	Netherlands
28–30	Speed skiing	(France) 2022 FIS Speed Skiing World Championships	International	Men: (France) Simon Billy; Women: (Italy) Valentina Greggio
29–30	Cyclo-cross	(United States) 2022 UCI Cyclo-cross World Championships	International	Men: (United Kingdom) Tom Pidcock; Women: (Netherlands) Marianne Vos
29–30	Indoor rowing	(Sweden) 2022 European Rowing Indoor Championships	Continental	Cancelled
29–6 February	Futsal	(Paraguay) 2022 Copa América de Futsal	Continental	Argentina

=== February ===
Date	Sport	Venue/Event	Status	Winner/s
2–6	Indoor hockey	(Belgium) 2022 Men's FIH Indoor Hockey World Cup (Belgium) 2022 Women's FIH Indoor Hockey World Cup	International	Cancelled
3–6	Triathlon	(Andorra) 2022 World Triathlon Winter Championships	International	Russian Triathlon Federation
3–12	Association football	(United Arab Emirates) 2021 FIFA Club World Cup	International	(England) Chelsea
4–5	Skyrunning	(Spain) 2022 Skysnow World Championships	International	Italy
4–20	Multi-sport	(China) 2022 Winter Olympics	International	Norway
5–6	Motorsport	(Sweden) 2022 Race of Champions	International	(France) Sébastien Loeb
5–20	Association football	(Ecuador) 2022 U-20 Copa Libertadores	Continental	(Uruguay) Peñarol
5–19 March	Rugby union	(England) / (France) / (Ireland) / (Italy) / (Scotland) / (Wales) 2022 Six Nations Championship	Continental	France
5–20 March	Rugby union	(Georgia (country)) / (Netherlands) / (Portugal) / (Romania) / (Russia) / (Spain) 2022 Rugby Europe Championship	Continental	Georgia
6	American football	(United States) 2022 Pro Bowl	Domestic	American Football Conference
7–13	Snooker	(England) 2022 Players Championship (Cazoo Cup #2)	International	(Australia) Neil Robertson
10–14	Snooker	(England) 2022 World Women's Snooker Championship	International	(Thailand) Nutcharut Wongharuthai
11–13	Basketball	(Egypt) 2022 FIBA Intercontinental Cup	International	(Brazil) Flamengo
11–13	Indoor hockey	(Turkey) 2022 Men's EuroHockey Indoor Club Cup	Continental	(Russia) Dinamo Elektrostal
11–13	Indoor hockey	(Netherlands) 2022 Women's EuroHockey Indoor Club Cup	Continental	Cancelled
11–20	Badminton	(New Zealand) 2022 Oceania Badminton Championships	Continental	Cancelled
12	Formula racing	2022 Mexico City ePrix (FE #3)	International	(Germany) Pascal Wehrlein ( (Germany) Porsche)
13	American football	(United States) Super Bowl LVI	Domestic	(California) Los Angeles Rams
14–17	Badminton	(Uganda) 2022 All Africa Men's and Women's Team Badminton Championships	Continental	Men: Algeria; Women: Egypt
14–19	Archery	(Slovenia) 2022 Archery European Indoor Championships	Continental	Ukraine
14–26	Association football	(Cambodia) 2022 AFF U-23 Championship	Regional	Vietnam
15–20	Badminton	(Malaysia) 2022 Badminton Asia Team Championships	Continental	Men: Malaysia; Women: Indonesia
15–20	Badminton	(Finland) 2022 European Team Badminton Championships	Continental	Cancelled
16–27	Ice stock sport	(Italy) 2022 Icestocksport World Championships	International	Germany
17–20	Badminton	(Mexico) 2022 Pan Am Male & Female Badminton Cup	Continental	Men: Canada; Women: United States
18–20	Badminton	(Uganda) 2022 African Badminton Championships	Continental	Men: (Nigeria) Anuoluwapo Juwon Opeyori; Women: (Egypt) Nour Ahmed Youssri
18–20	Badminton	(Finland) 2022 European U15 Badminton Championships	Continental	Postponed
18–27	Archery	(United Arab Emirates) 2022 World Para Archery Championship	International	Russian Archery Federation
19	Athletics	(Australia) 2022 World Athletics Cross Country Championships	International	Postponed to 18 February 2023
19–20	Athletics	(Bolivia) 2022 South American Indoor Championships in Athletics	Continental	Brazil
19–20	Sport fishing	(Lithuania) 2022 Ice Fishing World Championship	International	Lithuania
19–26	Handball	(Guinea) 2022 African Women's Junior Handball Championship	Continental	Angola
20	Basketball	(United States) 2022 NBA All-Star Game	Domestic	Team LeBron
20	Stock car racing	(United States) 2022 Daytona 500	Domestic	(Ohio) Austin Cindric ( (North Carolina) Team Penske)
20–20 November	Stock car racing	(United States) 2022 NASCAR Xfinity Series	Domestic	(North Carolina) Ty Gibbs ( (North Carolina) Joe Gibbs Racing)
22–6 March	Nordic skiing	(Norway) / (Poland) 2022 Nordic Junior World Ski Championships	International	Russia
23–27	Sled dog racing	(Norway) 2022 IFSS On-Snow World Championships	International	Norway
23–2 March	Association football	(Brazil) 2022 Recopa Sudamericana	Continental	(Brazil) Palmeiras
23–2 March	Biathlon	(United States) Biathlon Junior World Championships 2022	International	Norway
24–27	Rallying	2022 Rally Sweden (WRC #2)	International	WRC: (Finland) Kalle Rovanperä & (Finland) Jonne Halttunen ( (Japan) Toyota Gazoo Racing WRT); WRC-2: (Norway) Andreas Mikkelsen & (Norway) Torstein Eriksen ( (Germany) Toksport WRT); WRC-3: (Finland) Lauri Joona & (Finland) Mikael Korhonen
25–26	Indoor rowing	(Germany) 2022 World Rowing Indoor Championships	International	China
25–6 March	Multi-sport	(Egypt) 2022 African Youth Games	Continental	Postponed
25–12 March	Association football	(Dominican Republic) 2022 CONCACAF Women's U-20 Championship	Continental	United States
26	Horse racing	(Saudi Arabia) 2022 Saudi Cup	International	Horse: (United States) Emblem Road; Jockey: (Panama) Wigberto Ramos; Trainer: (Saudi Arabia) Mitab Almulawah
26–27	Table tennis	(Switzerland) 2022 Europe Top 16 Cup	Continental	Men: (Slovenia) Darko Jorgić; Women: (Germany) Han Ying
26–3 March	Fencing	(Uzbekistan) 2022 Asian Cadets and Juniors Fencing Championships	Continental	Uzbekistan
26–7 March	Fencing	(Serbia) 2022 European Cadets and Juniors Fencing Championships	Continental	Hungary
27	Motocross racing	(United Kingdom) 2022 MXGP of Great Britain	International	Race 1 Winner: (Slovenia) Tim Gajser; Race 2 Winner: (Spain) Jorge Prado; Round Winner: (Slovenia) Tim Gajser
27–4 March	Handball	(Guinea) 2022 African Women's Youth Handball Championship	Continental	Egypt
28–4 March	Sled dog racing	(Sweden) 2022 IFSS/WSA Long Distance World Championships	International	Norway

=== March ===
Date	Sport	Venue/Event	Status	Winner/s
1	Ice hockey	(Sweden) 2022 Champions Hockey League Final	Continental	(Sweden) Rögle BK
1–19	Association football	(Uruguay) 2022 South American U-17 Women's Championship	Continental	Brazil
2–5	Speed skating	(United States) 2022 World University Speed Skating Championships	International	Japan
2–14	Amateur boxing	(Jordan) 2022 Asian Youth & Junior Boxing Championships	Continental	Uzbekistan
3–5	Speed skating	(Norway) 2022 World Sprint Speed Skating Championships	International	Men: (Netherlands) Thomas Krol; Women: (Netherlands) Jutta Leerdam
3–6	Tug of war	(Netherlands) 2022 Tug of War World Indoor Championship	International	Cancelled
3–9	Alpine skiing	(Canada) World Junior Alpine Skiing Championships 2022	International	Austria
3–9	Ice hockey	(Kyrgyzstan) 2022 IIHF World Championship Division IV	International	Kyrgyzstan
4–5	Athletics	(Oman) 2022 World Athletics Race Walking Team Championships	International	China
4–6	Short track speed skating	(Poland) 2022 World Junior Short Track Speed Skating Championships	International	South Korea
4–13	Multi-sport	(China) 2022 Winter Paralympics	International	China
4–3 April	Cricket	(New Zealand) 2022 Women's Cricket World Cup	International	Australia
5–6	Speed skating	(Norway) 2022 World Allround Speed Skating Championships	International	Men: (Sweden) Nils van der Poel; Women: (Netherlands) Irene Schouten
5–12	Curling	(Sweden) 2022 World Junior Curling Championships	International	Postponed to 15–22 May 2022
6	Athletics	(Nepal) 2022 Asian Cross Country Championships	Continental	Postponed to October 2022
6	Marathon	(Japan) 2022 Tokyo Marathon (WMM #1)^{†}	International	Men: (Kenya) Eliud Kipchoge; Women: (Kenya) Brigid Kosgei
6	Motorcycle racing	2022 Qatar motorcycle Grand Prix (MotoGP #1)	International	MotoGP: (Italy) Enea Bastianini ( (Italy) Gresini Racing MotoGP); Moto2: (Italy) Celestino Vietti ( (Italy) Mooney VR46 Racing Team); Moto3: (Italy) Andrea Migno ( (Italy) Rivacold Snipers Team)
6	Motocross racing	(Lombardy) 2022 MXGP of Lombardia	International	Race 1 Winner: (Spain) Jorge Prado; Race 2 Winner: (Slovenia) Tim Gajser; Round Winner: (Slovenia) Tim Gajser
7–13	Wrestling	(Bulgaria) 2022 European U23 Wrestling Championship	Continental	Azerbaijan
7–14	Handball	(Kazakhstan) 2022 Asian Women's Junior Handball Championship	Continental	India
9–20	Tennis	(United States) 2022 Indian Wells Masters	International	Men: (United States) Taylor Fritz; Women: (Poland) Iga Świątek
10–12	Sled dog racing	(Sweden) 2022 Sleddog World Championships	International	Germany
10–13	Carom billiards	(Germany) 2022 UMB World Three-cushion Championship for National Teams	International	Turkey
10–14	Golf	(United States) 2022 Players Championship	International	(Australia) Cameron Smith
10–13	Ski jumping	(Norway) FIS Ski Flying World Championships 2022	International	(Norway) Marius Lindvik
10–20	Multi-sport	(Thailand) 2021 Asian Indoor and Martial Arts Games	Continental	Postponed to November 2023
11–13	Acrobatic gymnastics	(Azerbaijan) 2022 Acrobatic Gymnastics World Championships	International	Belgium
11–24	Amateur boxing	(Croatia) 2022 European U22 Boxing Championships	Continental	Italy
12–13	Athletics	(Portugal) 2022 European Throwing Cup	Continental	Italy
13–18	Ice hockey	(South Africa) 2022 IIHF World Championship Division III (Group B)	International	South Africa
14–18	Paralympic shooting	(Norway) 2022 World Shooting Para Sport European 10m Championships	Continental	Slovakia
14–19	Ski orienteering	(Finland) 2022 World Ski Orienteering Championships	International	Norway
15–20	Goalball	(Brazil) 2022 Goalball Youth World Championships	International	Postponed to July 2023
15–4 April	Basketball	(United States) 2022 NCAA Division I men's basketball tournament	Domestic	Kansas Jayhawks
16–20	Badminton	2022 All England Open (Super 1000 #1)	International	Men: (Denmark) Viktor Axelsen; Women: (Japan) Akane Yamaguchi
16–3 April	Basketball	(United States) 2022 NCAA Division I women's basketball tournament	Domestic	South Carolina Gamecocks
17–19	Synchronized skating	(Austria) 2022 World Junior Synchronized Skating Championships	International	(Finland) Team Fintastic Junior
18	Endurance racing	(United States) 2022 1000 Miles of Sebring (WEC #1)	International	Hypercar: (France) Nicolas Lapierre, (Brazil) André Negrão & (France) Matthieu Vaxivière ( (France) Alpine Elf Team); LMP2: (United Kingdom) Paul di Resta, (United States) Joshua Pierson & (United Kingdom) Oliver Jarvis ( (United States) United Autosports USA); LMGTE Pro: (France) Kévin Estre & (Denmark) Michael Christensen ( (Germany) Porsche GT Team); LMGTE Am: (Canada) Paul Dalla Lana, (United Kingdom) David Pittard & (Denmark) Nicki Thiim ( (Canada) Northwest AMR)
18–20	Athletics	(Serbia) 2022 World Athletics Indoor Championships	International	Ethiopia
18–27	Handball	(Kazakhstan) 2022 Asian Women's Youth Handball Championship	Continental	Iran
19	Road bicycle racing	(Italy) 2022 Milan–San Remo (Monument #1)	International	(Slovenia) Matej Mohorič ( Team Bahrain Victorious)
19–27	Curling	(Canada) 2022 World Women's Curling Championship	International	Switzerland
19–27	Shooting	(Norway) 2022 European 10 m Events Championships	Continental	Armenia
20	Athletics	(Japan) 2022 Asian Race Walking Championships	Continental	Cancelled
20	Formula racing	2022 Bahrain Grand Prix (F1 #1)	International	(Monaco) Charles Leclerc ( (Italy) Ferrari)
20	Motorcycle racing	(Indonesia) 2022 Indonesian motorcycle Grand Prix (MotoGP #2)	International	MotoGP: (Portugal) Miguel Oliveira ( (Austria) Red Bull KTM Factory Racing); Moto2: (Thailand) Somkiat Chantra ( (Japan) Idemitsu Honda Team Asia); Moto3: (Italy) Dennis Foggia ( (Luxembourg) Leopard Racing)
20	Motocross racing	2022 MXGP of Argentina	International	Race 1 Winner: (France) Maxime Renaux; Race 2 Winner: (Slovenia) Tim Gajser; Round Winner: (Slovenia) Tim Gajser
20–22	Canoe slalom	(Thailand) 2022 Asian Canoe Slalom Championships	Continental	Postponed
20–25	Multi-sport	(Finland) 2022 European Youth Olympic Winter Festival	Continental	Finland
21–26	Basketball	(Venezuela) 2022 South American U18 Basketball Championship	Continental	Brazil
22–25	Ice hockey	(Serbia) 2022 IIHF Women's World Championship Division III (Group B)	International	Estonia
22–26	Handball	(Argentina) 2022 South and Central American Women's Junior Handball Championship	Continental	Argentina
22–27	Multi-sport event	(Germany) 2022 Winter Military World Games	International	Cancelled
22–28	Beach handball	(Iran) 2022 Asian Beach Handball Championship	Continental	Iran
22–2 April	Amateur boxing	(Ecuador) 2022 Panamerican Men's & Women's Boxing Championships	Continental	Brazil
22–3 April	Tennis	(United States) 2022 Miami Open	International	Men: (Spain) Carlos Alcaraz; Women: (Poland) Iga Świątek
23–26	Figure skating	(France) 2022 World Figure Skating Championships	International	Japan
23–27	Bandy	(Sweden) 2022 Women's Bandy World Championship	International	Sweden
23–27	Golf	(United States) 2022 WGC Match Play	International	(United States) Scottie Scheffler
23–27	Martial arts	(Netherlands) 2021 Mixed Martial Arts World Championships	International	Kazakhstan
24–26	Canoe sprint	(Thailand) 2022 Asian Canoe Sprint Championships	Continental	Iran
25–27	Parkour	(Japan) 2022 Parkour World Championships	International	Postponed to October 14–16
25–30	Road bicycle racing	(Tajikistan) 2022 Asian Road Cycling Championships	Continental	Kazakhstan
26	Horse racing	(United Arab Emirates) 2022 Dubai World Cup	International	Horse: (United States) Country Grammer; Jockey: (Italy) Frankie Dettori; Trainer: (United States) Bob Baffert
26–30 April	Rugby union	(England) / (France) / (Ireland) / (Italy) / (Scotland) / (Wales) 2022 Women's Six Nations Championship	Continental	England
27	Athletics	(Brazil) 2022 Pan American Cross Country Cup	Continental	Brazil
27	Formula racing	(Saudi Arabia) 2022 Saudi Arabian Grand Prix (F1 #2)	International	(Netherlands) Max Verstappen ( (Austria) Red Bull Racing-RBPT)
27–9 April	Bridge	(Italy) 2021 World Bridge Team Championships	International	Bermuda Bowl: Switzerland; Venice Cup: Sweden; d'Orsi Trophy: Poland; Wuhan Cup: France
27–9 April	Chess	(Slovenia) 2022 European Individual Chess Championship	Continental	(Germany) Matthias Blübaum
28–1 April	Pool	(United States) 2022 WPA World Ten-ball Championship	International	(Poland) Wojciech Szewczyk
28–3 April	Snooker	(Wales) 2022 Tour Championship (Cazoo Cup #3)	International	(Australia) Neil Robertson
28–3 April	Wrestling	(Hungary) 2022 European Wrestling Championships	Continental	Turkey
31–3 April	Golf	(United States) 2022 Chevron Championship	International	(United States) Jennifer Kupcho

=== April ===
Date	Sport	Venue/Event	Status	Winner/s
1–12	Field hockey	(South Africa) 2022 Women's FIH Hockey Junior World Cup	International	Netherlands
2–3	Water polo	(Greece) 2022 LEN Euro League Women Final Four	Continental	(Greece) Olympiacos Piraeus
2–9	Flying disc	(United States) 2022 World Beach Ultimate Championships	International	Cancelled
2–10	Curling	(United States) 2022 World Men's Curling Championship	International	Sweden
2–10	Darts	(England) 2022 WDF World Darts Championship	International	Men: (Northern Ireland) Neil Duff; Women: (England) Beau Greaves
2–10	Fencing	(United Arab Emirates) 2022 Junior and Cadet World Fencing Championships	International	United States
2–10	Futsal	(Thailand) 2022 AFF Futsal Championship	Regional	Thailand
24	Motocross racing	2022 MXGP of Portugal	International	Race 1 Winner: (Spain) Jorge Prado; Race 2 Winner: (Slovenia) Tim Gajser; Round Winner: (Spain) Jorge Prado
3	Motorcycle racing	(Argentina) 2022 Argentine Republic motorcycle Grand Prix	International	MotoGP: (Spain) Aleix Espargaró ( (Italy) Aprilia Racing); Moto2: (Italy) Celestino Vietti ( (Italy) Mooney VR46 Racing Team); Moto3: (Spain) Sergio García ( (Spain) GasGas Aspar Team)
3	Road bicycle racing	(Belgium) 2022 Tour of Flanders (Monument #2)	International	(Netherlands) Mathieu van der Poel ( (Belgium) Alpecin–Fenix)
3–8	Ice hockey	(Luxembourg) 2022 IIHF World Championship Division III (Group A)	International	United Arab Emirates
3–8	Ice hockey	(Spain) 2022 IIHF Women's World Championship Division II (Group A)	International	Great Britain
3–9	Basketball	(Argentina) 2022 South American U18 Women's Basketball Championship	Continental	Brazil
4–8	Handball	(Mexico) 2022 North America and Caribbean Women's Junior Handball Championship	Continental	Mexico
4–8	Weightlifting	(Puerto Rico) 2022 Pan American Youth Weightlifting Championships	Continental	Postponed
4–8	Weightlifting	(Puerto Rico) 2022 Pan American U15 Weightlifting Championships	Continental	Postponed
4–9	Ice hockey	(Bulgaria) 2022 IIHF Women's World Championship Division III (Group A)	International	Belgium
6–9	Parachuting	(Belgium) 2022 World Cup of Indoor Skydiving	International	Czech Republic
6–10	Equestrian	(Germany) 2022 FEI World Cup Finals	International	Dressage: (Germany) Jessica von Bredow-Werndl; Show Jumping: (Switzerland) Martin Fuchs
6–10	Pool	(England) 2022 WPA World Nine-ball Championship	International	(United States) Shane Van Boening
6–24	Association football	(Chile) 2022 South American Under-20 Women's Football Championship	Continental	Brazil
7–9	Synchronized skating	(Canada) 2022 World Synchronized Skating Championships	International	(Canada) Les Suprêmes
7–10	Golf	(United States) 2022 Masters Tournament	International	(United States) Scottie Scheffler
7–5 November	Baseball	(United States) / (Canada) 2022 Major League Baseball season	Domestic	(Texas) Houston Astros
8–10	Basketball	(Turkey) 2022 EuroLeague Women Final Four	Continental	(Hungary) Sopron Basket
8–10	Short track speed skating	(Canada) 2022 World Short Track Speed Skating Championships	International	Men: (Hungary) Shaoang Liu; Women: (South Korea) Choi Min-jeong
8–14	Ice hockey	(Poland) 2022 IIHF Women's World Championship Division I (Group B)	International	China
9	Horse racing	(United Kingdom) 2022 Grand National	International	Horse: (Republic of Ireland) Noble Yeats; Jockey: (United Kingdom) Sam Waley-Cohen; Trainer: (Republic of Ireland) Emmet Mullins
9–10	Formula racing	(Italy) 2022 Rome ePrix (FE #4/5)	International	Race 1: (New Zealand) Mitch Evans ( (United Kingdom) Jaguar Racing); Race 2: (New Zealand) Mitch Evans ( (United Kingdom) Jaguar Racing)
9–10	Motorcycle racing	(Aragon) 2022 WSBK Aragón Round	International	R1: (United Kingdom) Jonathan Rea ( (Japan) Kawasaki Racing Team WorldSBK); SR: (Spain) Álvaro Bautista ( (Italy) Aruba.it Racing-Ducati); R2: (Spain) Álvaro Bautista ( (Italy) Aruba.it Racing-Ducati)
9–10	Mountain running	(Chile) 2022 South American Mountain Running Championships	Continental	Men: (Colombia) Jacinto Lopez; Women: (Colombia) Stella Castro
10	Formula racing	(Australia) 2022 Australian Grand Prix (F1 #3)^{†}	International	(Monaco) Charles Leclerc ( (Italy) Ferrari)
10	Motocross racing	2022 MXGP of Trentino	International	Race 1 Winner: (Slovenia) Tim Gajser; Race 2 Winner: (Slovenia) Tim Gajser; Round Winner: (Slovenia) Tim Gajser
10	Motorcycle racing	(United States) 2022 Motorcycle Grand Prix of the Americas	International	MotoGP: (Italy) Enea Bastianini ( (Italy) Gresini Racing MotoGP); Moto2: (Italy) Tony Arbolino ( (Belgium) Elf Marc VDS Racing Team); Moto3: (Spain) Jaume Masià ( (Finland) Red Bull KTM Ajo)
10–13	Beach handball	(Brazil) 2022 South and Central American Beach Handball Championship	Continental	Men: Brazil; Women: Argentina
10–17	Tennis	(Monaco) 2022 Monte-Carlo Masters	International	(Greece) Stefanos Tsitsipas
10–22	Amateur boxing	(Bulgaria) 2022 Youth European Boxing Championships	Continental	Ukraine
13–18	Field hockey	(Netherlands) 2022 Men's Euro Hockey League	Continental	(Netherlands) Bloemendaal
14–17	Figure skating	(Estonia) 2022 World Junior Figure Skating Championships	International	United States
14–21	Sailing	(France) 2022 EurILCA Under 21 European Championships	Continental	ILCA 6: (Israel) Shai Kakon; ILCA 7: (Netherlands) Paul Hameeteman
15–17	Judo	(Peru) 2022 Pan American-Oceania Judo Championships	Continental	Brazil
15–18	Field hockey	(Netherlands) 2022 Women's Euro Hockey League	Continental	(Netherlands) Amsterdam
16–18	Athletics	(Guyana) 2022 CARIFTA Games	Regional	Jamaica
16–2 May	Snooker	(England) 2022 World Snooker Championship (Triple Crown #3)	International	(England) Ronnie O'Sullivan
16–16 June	Basketball	(United States) / (Canada) 2022 NBA playoffs	Domestic	(California) Golden State Warriors
17	Road bicycle racing	(France) 2022 Paris–Roubaix (Monument #3)	International	(Netherlands) Dylan van Baarle ( (United Kingdom) Ineos Grenadiers)
18	Marathon	(United States) 2022 Boston Marathon (WMM #2)	International	Men: (Kenya) Evans Chebet; Women: (Kenya) Peres Jepchirchir
18–23	Ice hockey	(Iceland) 2022 IIHF World Championship Division II (Group B)	International	Iceland
19–24	Wrestling	(Mongolia) 2022 Asian Wrestling Championships	Continental	Japan
20–22	Cheerleading	(United States) 2022 World Cheerleading Championships	International	United States
20–24	Mountain biking	(Argentina) 2022 UCI Mountain Bike Masters World Championships	International	Argentina
20–30	Air sports	(Brazil) 2022 FAI World Paramotor Championships	International	France
21–24	Rallying	2022 Croatia Rally (WRC #3)	International	WRC: (Finland) Kalle Rovanperä & (Finland) Jonne Halttunen ( (Japan) Toyota Gazoo Racing WRT); WRC-2: (France) Yohan Rossel & (France) Benjamin Boulloud ( (France) PH Sport); WRC-3: (Finland) Lauri Joona & (Finland) Mikael Korhonen
21-24	Taekwondo	(South Korea) 2022 World Taekwondo Poomsae Championships	International	South Korea
23–24	Motorcycle racing	(Netherlands) 2022 WSBK Dutch Round	International	R1: (United Kingdom) Jonathan Rea ( (Japan) Kawasaki Racing Team WorldSBK); SR: (United Kingdom) Jonathan Rea ( (Japan) Kawasaki Racing Team WorldSBK); R2: (Spain) Álvaro Bautista ( (Italy) Aruba.it Racing-Ducati)
23–30	Curling	(Switzerland) 2022 World Mixed Doubles Curling Championship	International	Scotland (Eve Muirhead & Bobby Lammie)
23–1 May	Ice hockey	(Germany) 2022 IIHF World U18 Championships	International	Sweden
23–8 May	Association football	(Dominican Republic) 2022 CONCACAF Women's U-17 Championship	Continental	United States
24	Formula racing	(Italy) 2022 Emilia Romagna Grand Prix (F1 #4)	International	(Netherlands) Max Verstappen ( (Austria) Red Bull Racing-RBPT)
24	Motorcycle racing	(Portugal) 2022 Portuguese motorcycle Grand Prix	International	MotoGP: (France) Fabio Quartararo ( (Japan) Monster Energy Yamaha MotoGP); Moto2: (United States) Joe Roberts ( (Italy) Italtrans Racing Team); Moto3: (Spain) Sergio García ( (Spain) GasGas Aspar Team)
24	Motocross racing	2022 MXGP of Latvia	International	Race 1 Winner: (Slovenia) Tim Gajser; Race 2 Winner: (Slovenia) Tim Gajser; Round Winner: (Slovenia) Tim Gajser
24	Road bicycle racing	(Belgium) 2022 Liège–Bastogne–Liège (Monument #4)	International	(Belgium) Remco Evenepoel ( (Belgium) Quick-Step Alpha Vinyl Team)
24–30	Ice hockey	(France) 2022 IIHF Women's World Championship Division I (Group A)	International	France
24–30	Volleyball	(Kazakhstan) 2022 Asian Women's Club Volleyball Championship	Continental	(Kazakhstan) Kuanysh
25	Association football	(Switzerland) 2022 UEFA Youth League Final	Continental	(Portugal) Benfica
25–29	Bowls	(England) 2022 World Bowls Indoor Championships	International	Men: (Scotland) Michael Stepney; Women: (Scotland) Julie Forrest
25–30	Badminton	(Spain) 2022 European Badminton Championships	Continental	Men: (Denmark) Viktor Axelsen; Women: (Spain) Carolina Marín
25–30	Ice hockey	(Croatia) 2022 IIHF World Championship Division II (Group A)	International	China
26–29	Badminton	(El Salvador) 2022 Pan Am Badminton Championships	Continental	Men: (Guatemala) Kevin Cordón; Women: (Canada) Michelle Li
26–30	Handball	(Brazil) 2022 South and Central American Women's Youth Handball Championship	Continental	Brazil
26–1 May	Badminton	(Philippines) 2022 Badminton Asia Championships	Continental	Men: (Malaysia) Lee Zii Jia; Women: (China) Wang Zhiyi
26–1 May	Ice hockey	(Poland) 2022 IIHF World Championship Division I (Group B)	International	Poland
27–4 May	Association football	(Mexico) / (United States) 2022 CONCACAF Champions League Final	Continental	(United States) Seattle Sounders FC
28–30	American football	(United States) 2022 NFL draft	Domestic	#1 pick: (Georgia (U.S. state)) Travon Walker
28–1 May	Badminton	(Australia) 2022 Oceania Badminton Championships	Continental	Men: (New Zealand) Edward Lau; Women: (Australia) Chen Hsuan-yu
28–8 May	Tennis	(Spain) 2022 Madrid Open	International	Men: (Spain) Carlos Alcaraz; Women: (Tunisia) Ons Jabeur
28–8 May	Multi-sport event	(Argentina) 2022 South American Youth Games	Continental	Brazil
29–1 May	Futsal	(Latvia) 2022 UEFA Futsal Champions League Final Four	Continental	(Spain) Barcelona
29–1 May	Judo	(Bulgaria) 2022 European Judo Championships	Continental	France
29–6 May	Sailing	(United States) 2022 A-Catamaran World Championship	International	A-Class Open: (United States) Ravi Parent; A-Class Classic: (Australia) Andrew Landenberger
30	Formula racing	2022 Monaco ePrix (FE #6)	International	(Belgium) Stoffel Vandoorne ( (Germany) Mercedes-EQ)
30	Professional boxing	(United States) Katie Taylor vs. Amanda Serrano	International	(Republic of Ireland) Katie Taylor
30–5 May	Wheelchair curling	(Finland) 2022 World Wheelchair Mixed Doubles Curling Championship	International	Sweden

=== May ===
Date	Sport	Venue/Event	Status	Winner/s
1	Dancesport	(China) 2022 WDSF PD Latin World Championship	International	Cancelled
1	Motorcycle racing	(Spain) 2022 Spanish motorcycle Grand Prix	International	MotoGP: (Italy) Francesco Bagnaia ( (Italy) Ducati Lenovo Team); Moto2: (Japan) Ai Ogura ( (Japan) Idemitsu Honda Team Asia); Moto3: (Spain) Izan Guevara ( (Spain) Gaviota GasGas Aspar Team); MotoE Race 1: (Brazil) Eric Granado ( (Monaco) LCR E-Team); MotoE Race 2: (Brazil) Eric Granado ( (Monaco) LCR E-Team)
1–5	Draughts	(Turkey) 2022 Draughts World National Teams Championship	International	Netherlands
1–5	Curling	(Lithuania) 2022 European Curling Championships (Division C)	Continental	Men: Ireland; Women: Belgium
1–15	Multi-sport event	(Brazil) 2021 Summer Deaflympics^{†}	International	Ukraine
1–15	CP football	(Spain) 2022 IFCPF CP Football Men's World Cup	International	Ukraine
2–7	Sailing	(Germany) 2022 Soling World Championship	International	Postponed due to bad weather conditions
2–10	Weightlifting	(Greece) 2022 Junior World Weightlifting Championships	International	Turkey
3–4	Taekwondo	(Dominican Republic) 2022 Pan American Taekwondo Championships	Continental	Brazil
3–8	Ice hockey	(Slovenia) 2022 IIHF World Championship Division I (Group A)	International	Slovenia
3–8	Powerlifting	(Czech Republic) 2022 EPF European Open Powerlifting Championships	Continental	Ukraine
3–15	Association football	(Bosnia and Herzegovina) 2022 UEFA Women's Under-17 Championship	Continental	Germany
4–8	Floorball	(Poland) 2022 Women's Under-19 World Floorball Championships	International	Postponed to 31 August – 4 September
5–8	Pool	(Gibraltar) 2022 World Pool Masters	International	(Germany) Joshua Filler
5–8	Wrestling	(Mexico) 2022 Pan American Wrestling Championships	Continental	United States
6–8	Basketball	(Spain) 2022 Basketball Champions League Final Four	Continental	(Spain) Lenovo Tenerife
6–8	Canoe slalom	(United States) 2022 Pan American Canoe Slalom Championships	Continental	United States
6–29	Road bicycle racing	(Italy) 2022 Giro d'Italia (Grand Tour #1)	International	(Australia) Jai Hindley ( (Germany) Bora–Hansgrohe)
7	Endurance racing	(Belgium) 2022 6 Hours of Spa-Francorchamps (WEC #2)	International	Hypercar: (United Kingdom) Mike Conway, (Japan) Kamui Kobayashi & (Argentina) José María López ( (Japan) Toyota Gazoo Racing); LMP2: (Indonesia) Sean Gelael, (Netherlands) Robin Frijns & (Germany) René Rast ( (Belgium) Team WRT); LMGTE Pro: (Italy) Alessandro Pier Guidi & (United Kingdom) James Calado ( (Italy) AF Corse); LMGTE Am: (Germany) Christian Ried, (France) Sebastian Priaulx & (United Kingdom) Harry Tincknell ( (Germany) Dempsey-Proton Racing)
7	Horse Racing	(United States) 2022 Kentucky Derby	International	Horse: (United States) Rich Strike; Jockey: (Venezuela) Sonny Leon; Trainer: (United States) Eric Reed
7	Triathlon	(Denmark) 2022 World Triathlon Middle Distance Duathlon Championships	International	Men: (Slovakia) Ondrej Kubo; Women: (Switzerland) Melanie Maurer
7	Triathlon	(United States) 2021 Ironman World Championship^{†}	International	Men: (Norway) Kristian Blummenfelt; Women: (Switzerland) Daniela Ryf
7–14	Arm wrestling	(Romania) 2022 European Armwrestling & Para-Armwrestling Championships	Continental	Turkey
29	Motocross racing	2022 MXGP of Italy	International	Race 1 Winner: (Slovenia) Tim Gajser; Race 2 Winner: (Slovenia) Tim Gajser; Round Winner: (Slovenia) Tim Gajser
8	Formula racing	(United States) 2022 Miami Grand Prix (F1 #5)	International	(Netherlands) Max Verstappen ( (Austria) Red Bull Racing-RBPT)
8–15	Badminton	(Thailand) 2022 Thomas & Uber Cup	International	Thomas Cup: India; Uber Cup: South Korea
8–15	Tennis	(Italy) 2022 Italian Open	International	Men: (Serbia) Novak Djokovic; Women: (Poland) Iga Świątek
8–20	Amateur boxing	(Turkey) 2022 IBA Women's World Boxing Championships	International	Turkey
9–15	Sailing	(United States) 2022 Melges 24 World Championship	International	United States
12–15	Pétanque	(Denmark) 2022 Pétanque World Championships	International	Spain
12–15	Karate	(Uzbekistan) 2022 Asian Cadet, Junior and U-21yrs Karate Championships	Continental	Postponed to 20–24 July
12–16	Sailing	(United States) 2022 Lightning Master World Championship	International	United States (Jody Starck, William Faude, Randy Borges & Tom Starck)
12–23	Multi-sport event	(Vietnam) 2021 Southeast Asian Games^{†}	Regional	Vietnam
13–21	Squash	(Egypt) 2022 PSA Men's World Squash Championship (Egypt) 2022 PSA Women's World Squash Championship	International	Men: (Egypt) Ali Farag; Women: (Egypt) Nour El Sherbini
13–29	Multi-sport event	(Japan) 2022 Summer World Masters Games	International	Postponed
13–29	Ice hockey	(Finland) 2022 IIHF World Championship	International	Finland
14–15	Formula racing	(Germany) 2022 Berlin ePrix (FE #7/8)	International	Race 1: (Switzerland) Edoardo Mortara ( (Monaco) ROKiT Venturi Racing); Race 2: (Netherlands) Nyck de Vries ( (Germany) Mercedes-EQ Formula E Team)
14–20	Volleyball	(Iran) 2022 Asian Men's Club Volleyball Championship	Continental	(Iran) Paykan Tehran
14–22	Multi-sport	(France) 2022 U18 World School Summer Games	International	France
15	Motorcycle racing	(France) 2022 French motorcycle Grand Prix	International	MotoGP: (Italy) Enea Bastianini ( (Italy) Ducati Lenovo Team); Moto2: (Spain) Augusto Fernández ( (Finland) Red Bull KTM Ajo); Moto3: (Spain) Jaume Masià ( (Finland) Red Bull KTM Ajo); MotoE Race 1: (Italy) Mattia Casadei ( (Spain) Pons Racing 40); MotoE Race 2: (Switzerland) Dominique Aegerter ( (Germany) Dynavolt Intact GP)
15	Motocross racing	(Sardinia) 2022 MXGP of Sardegna	International	Race 1 Winner: (Netherlands) Calvin Vlaanderen; Race 2 Winner: (Netherlands) Calvin Vlaanderen; Round Winner: (Netherlands) Calvin Vlaanderen
15–20	Sailing	(France) 2022 2.4mR European Championship	Continental	(United Kingdom) Megan Pascoe
15–22	Volleyball	(Philippines) 2021 Asian Women's Volleyball Championship	Continental	Cancelled
15–22	Curling	(Sweden) 2022 World Junior Curling Championships	International	Men: Scotland; Women: Japan
15–22	Sailing	(Italy) 2022 iQFOiL European Championships	Continental	Men: (France) Nicolas Goyard; Women: (France) Hélène Noesmoen
16–21	Sailing	(United States) 2022 Lightning World Championship	International	Chile (Felipe Robles, Carmina Malsch & Paula Herman)
16–1 June	Association football	(Israel) 2022 UEFA European Under-17 Championship	Continental	France
17–22	Ice hockey	(Croatia) 2022 IIHF Women's World Championship Division II (Group B)	International	Iceland
17–22	Wrestling	(Morocco) 2022 African Wrestling Championships	Continental	Egypt
18	Association football	(Spain) 2022 UEFA Europa League Final	Continental	(Germany) Eintracht Frankfurt
18–22	Orienteering	(Lithuania) 2022 European MTB Orienteering Championships	Continental	Czech Republic
19–21	Basketball	(Serbia) 2022 EuroLeague Final Four	Continental	(Turkey) Anadolu Efes
19–22	Golf	(United States) 2022 PGA Championship	International	(United States) Justin Thomas
19–22	Rallying	2022 Rally de Portugal (WRC #4)	International	WRC: (Finland) Kalle Rovanperä & (Finland) Jonne Halttunen ( (Japan) Toyota Gazoo Racing WRT); WRC-2: (France) Yohan Rossel & (France) Valentin Sarreaud ( (France) PH Sport); WRC-3: (Finland) Sami Pajari & (Finland) Enni Mälkönen
19–22	Taekwondo	(United Kingdom) 2022 European Taekwondo Championships	Continental	Turkey
20	Association football	(Nigeria) 2022 CAF Confederation Cup Final	Continental	(Morocco) RS Berkane
21	Association football	(Italy) 2022 UEFA Women's Champions League Final	Continental	(France) Lyon
21	Horse racing	(United States) 2022 Preakness Stakes	Domestic	Horse: (United States) Early Voting; Jockey: (Puerto Rico) José Ortiz; Trainer: (United States) Chad Brown
21–22	Rowing	(Italy) 2022 European Rowing U-19 Championships	Continental	Romania
21–22	Motorcycle racing	(Portugal) 2022 WSBK Estoril Round	International	R1: (Spain) Álvaro Bautista ( (Italy) Aruba.it Racing-Ducati); SR: (United Kingdom) Jonathan Rea ( (Japan) Kawasaki Racing Team WorldSBK); R2: (United Kingdom) Jonathan Rea ( (Japan) Kawasaki Racing Team WorldSBK)
21–28	Basketball	(Rwanda) 2022 BAL Playoffs	Continental	(Tunisia) US Monastir
21–29	Beach soccer	(Paraguay) 2022 Copa América de Beach Soccer	Continental	Paraguay
21–29	Powerlifting	(Kazakhstan) 2022 World Classic & Equipped Bench Press Championship	International	Kazakhstan
21–31	Amateur boxing	(Armenia) 2022 European Amateur Boxing Championships	Continental	Georgia
22	Formula racing	(Spain) 2022 Spanish Grand Prix (F1 #6)	International	(Netherlands) Max Verstappen ( (Austria) Red Bull Racing-RBPT)
22	Volleyball	(Slovenia) 2022 CEV Champions League Final (Slovenia) 2022 CEV Women's Champions League Final	Continental	Men: (Poland) ZAKSA Kędzierzyn-Koźle; Women: (Turkey) VakıfBank Istanbul
22–5 June	Tennis	(France) 2022 French Open	International	Men: (Spain) Rafael Nadal; Women: (Poland) Iga Świątek
23–28	Nine-pin bowling	(Estonia) 2022 World Singles Ninepin Bowling Classic Championships	International	Serbia
23–1 June	Field hockey	(Indonesia) 2022 Men's Hockey Asia Cup	Continental	South Korea
25	Association football	(Albania) 2022 UEFA Europa Conference League Final	Continental	(Italy) Roma
25–29	Karate	(Turkey) 2022 European Karate Championships	Continental	Turkey
26	Motorcycle racing	(Germany) 2022 Long Track of Nations	International	Germany
26–28	Karate	(Curaçao) 2022 Panamerican Karate Championships	Continental	Brazil
26–29	Canoe slalom	(Slovakia) 2022 European Canoe Slalom Championships	Continental	Czech Republic
26–29	Judo	(Algeria) 2022 African Judo Championships	Continental	Algeria
27–28	Indoor cycling	(Switzerland) 2022 UEC European Junior Indoor Cycling Championships	Continental	Germany
27–5 June	Surfing	(El Salvador) 2022 ISA World Junior Surfing Championship	International	Hawaii
28	Association football	(France) 2022 UEFA Champions League Final	Continental	(Spain) Real Madrid
28	Athletics	(France) 2022 European 10,000m Cup	Continental	Men: (France) Jimmy Gressier; Women: (Turkey) Yasemin Can
28	Rugby union	(France) 2022 European Rugby Champions Cup Final	Continental	(France) La Rochelle
28–5 June	Weightlifting	(Albania) 2022 European Weightlifting Championships	Continental	Bulgaria
29	Indy car racing	(United States) 2022 Indianapolis 500	International	(Sweden) Marcus Ericsson ( (United States) Chip Ganassi Racing)
29	Motorcycle racing	(Italy) 2022 Italian motorcycle Grand Prix	International	MotoGP: (Italy) Francesco Bagnaia ( (Italy) Ducati Lenovo Team); Moto2: (Spain) Pedro Acosta ( (Finland) Red Bull KTM Ajo); MotoE Race 1: (Switzerland) Dominique Aegerter ( (Germany) Dynavolt Intact GP); MotoE Race 2: (Italy) Matteo Ferrari ( (Italy) Felo Gresini MotoE)
29	Formula racing	2022 Monaco Grand Prix (F1 #7)	International	(Mexico) Sergio Pérez ( (Austria) Red Bull Racing-RBPT)
29	Motocross racing	2022 MXGP of Spain	International	Race 1 Winner: (France) Maxime Renaux; Race 2 Winner: (France) Maxime Renaux; Round Winner: (France) Maxime Renaux
30	Association football	(Morocco) 2022 CAF Champions League Final	Continental	(Morocco) Wydad AC
31–9 June	Aquatic sports	(Japan) 2022 FINA World Masters Championships	International	Postponed to 2–11 August 2023
31–17 July	Volleyball	(Turkey) 2022 FIVB Volleyball Women's Nations League	International	Italy

=== June ===
Date	Sport	Venue/Event	Status	Winner/s
1	Association football	(England) 2022 Finalissima	International	Argentina
1–11	Association football	(Uganda) 2022 CECAFA Women's Championship	Regional	Uganda
1–19	Association football	(Uzbekistan) 2022 AFC U-23 Asian Cup	Continental	Saudi Arabia
2–4	Water polo	(Serbia) 2022 LEN Champions League Final Eight	Continental	(Italy) Pro Recco
2–5	Golf	(United States) 2022 U.S. Women's Open	International	(Australia) Minjee Lee
2–5	Wildwater canoeing	(France) 2022 Wildwater Canoeing World Championships	International	France
2–5	Rallying	(Italy) 2022 Rally Italia Sardegna (WRC #5)	International	WRC: (Estonia) Ott Tänak & (Estonia) Martin Järveoja ( (South Korea) Hyundai Shell Mobis WRT); WRC-2: (Authorised Neutral Athletes) Nikolay Gryazin & (Authorised Neutral Athletes) Konstantin Aleksandrov ( (Germany) Toksport WRT 2); WRC-3: (Czech Republic) Jan Černý & (Czech Republic) Tomáš Střeska
2–5	Brazilian jiu-jitsu	(United States) 2022 World Jiu-Jitsu Championship	International	Brazil
3–8	Fencing	(Paraguay) 2022 Pan American Fencing Championships	Continental	United States
3–12	Beach soccer	(Portugal) 2022 Euro Winners Cup	Continental	(Portugal) Benfica Loures
4	Formula racing	(Indonesia) 2022 Jakarta ePrix (FE #9)	International	(New Zealand) Mitch Evans ( (United Kingdom) Jaguar Racing)
4	Horse racing	(United Kingdom) 2022 Epsom Derby	International	Horse: (United Kingdom) Desert Crown; Jockey: (United Kingdom) Richard Kingscote; Trainer: (United Kingdom) Michael Stoute
4–5	Handball	(Hungary) 2022 Women's EHF Champions League Final Four	Continental	(Norway) Vipers Kristiansand
4–5	Karate	(New Caledonia) 2022 Oceanian Karate Championships	Continental	Australia
4–11	Air sports	(Poland) 2022 FAI World Intermediate Aerobatic Championship	International	Individual: (Poland) Maciej Kulaszewski; Team event: Poland
4–11	Five-a-side football	(Slovakia) 2022 EMF EURO	Continental	Azerbaijan
4–9 July	Rugby union	(South Korea) 2022 Asia Rugby Championship	Continental	Hong Kong
5	Motocross racing	2022 MXGP Of France	International	Race 1 Winner: (Switzerland) Jeremy Seewer; Race 2 Winner: (Netherlands) Glenn Coldenhoff; Round Winner: (Switzerland) Jeremy Seewer
5	Motorcycle racing	(Spain) 2022 Catalan motorcycle Grand Prix	International	MotoGP: (France) Fabio Quartararo ( (Japan) Monster Energy Yamaha MotoGP); Moto2: (Italy) Celestino Vietti ( (Italy) Mooney VR46 Racing Team); Moto3: (Spain) Izan Guevara ( (Spain) Valresa GasGas Aspar Team)
5–12	Beach soccer	(Portugal) 2022 Women's Euro Winners Cup	Continental	(Spain) Bonaire Terrassa
6–9	Sport diving	(Morocco) 2022 World Sport Diving Championship	International	France
6–12	Archery	(Germany) 2022 European Archery Championships	Continental	Turkey
6–12	Basketball	(Mexico) 2022 FIBA Under-18 Americas Championship	Continental	United States
6–12	Powerlifting	(South Africa) 2022 World Classic Open Powerlifting Championships	International	United States
6–12	Triathlon	(Romania) 2022 World Triathlon Multisport Championships	International	Italy
6–13	Ice hockey	(United States) 2022 IIHF World Women's U18 Championship	International	Canada
6–13	Volleyball	(Thailand) 2022 Asian Girls' U18 Volleyball Championship	Continental	Japan
7–11	Athletics	(Australia) 2022 Oceania Athletics Championships	Continental	Australia
7–12	Beach volleyball	(Netherlands) 2022 European U22 Beach Volleyball Championships	Continental	Men: (Sweden) David Åhman & Jacob Hölting Nilsson; Women: (Spain) Daniela Álvarez & Tania Moreno
7–24 July	Volleyball	(Italy) 2022 FIVB Volleyball Men's Nations League	International	France
8–11	Basketball	(Guam) 2022 FIBA Micronesia Basketball Cup	Regional	Men: Guam; Women: Guam
8–12	Athletics	(Mauritius) 2022 African Championships in Athletics	Continental	Kenya
10–12	Fistball	(Italy) 2022 Men's European Fistball Championship	Continental	Germany
10–15	Fencing	(South Korea) 2022 Asian Fencing Championships	Continental	South Korea
10–16	Freeding	(Serbia) 2022 World Freediving Indoor Championship	International	Italy
10–19	Beach volleyball	(Italy) 2022 Beach Volleyball World Championships	International	Men: (Norway) Anders Mol & Christian Sørum; Women: (Brazil) Duda & Ana Patrícia
11	Horse racing	(United States) 2022 Belmont Stakes	Domestic	Horse: (United States) Mo Donegal; Jockey: (Puerto Rico) Irad Ortiz Jr.; Trainer: (United States) Todd Pletcher
11	Athletics	(Malta) 2022 Championships of the Small States of Europe	Continental	Cyprus
11–12	Motorcycle racing	(Italy) 2022 WSBK Emilia-Romagna Round	International	R1: (Spain) Álvaro Bautista ( (Italy) Aruba.it Racing-Ducati); SR: (Turkey) Toprak Razgatlıoğlu ( (Japan) Pata Yamaha with Brixx WorldSBK); R2: (Spain) Álvaro Bautista ( (Italy) Aruba.it Racing-Ducati)
11–12	Endurance racing	(France) 2022 24 Hours of Le Mans (WEC #3)	International	Hypercar: (Switzerland) Sébastien Buemi, (New Zealand) Brendon Hartley & (Japan) Ryō Hirakawa ( (Japan) Toyota Gazoo Racing); LMP2: (Portugal) António Félix da Costa, (Mexico) Roberto González & (United Kingdom) Will Stevens ( (United Kingdom) Jota); LMGTE Pro: (Italy) Gianmaria Bruni, (Austria) Richard Lietz & (France) Frédéric Makowiecki ( (Germany) Porsche GT Team); LMGTE Am: (Portugal) Henrique Chaves, (United States) Ben Keating & (Denmark) Marco Sørensen ( (United Kingdom) TF Sport)
11–18	Weightlifting	(Mexico) 2022 Youth World Weightlifting Championships	International	Kazakhstan
12	Formula racing	2022 Azerbaijan Grand Prix (F1 #8)	International	(Netherlands) Max Verstappen ( (Austria) Red Bull Racing-RBPT)
12	Motocross racing	2022 MXGP Of Germany	International	Race 1 Winner: (Slovenia) Tim Gajser; Race 2 Winner: (Switzerland) Jeremy Seewer; Round Winner: (Slovenia) Tim Gajser
12–18	Para swimming	(Portugal) 2022 World Para Swimming Championships	International	Italy
12–19	Basketball	(Qatar) 2022 FIBA U16 Asian Championship	Continental	Australia
13–19	Basketball	(Argentina) 2022 FIBA Under-18 Women's Americas Championship	Continental	United States
13–19	Wrestling	(Romania) 2022 European Cadets Wrestling Championships	Continental	Azerbaijan
14–19	Pool	(England) 2022 World Cup of Pool	International	Spain
14–19	Beach handball	(Greece) 2022 Youth Beach Handball World Championship	International	Men: Croatia; Women: Spain
15–18	Artistic gymnastics	(Qatar) 2022 Asian Artistic Gymnastics Championships	Continental	China
16–18	Aerobic gymnastics	(Portugal) 2022 Aerobic Gymnastics World Championships	International	South Korea
16–19	Athletics	(South Korea) 2022 Asian Junior Athletics Championships	Continental	Postponed to 2023
16–19	Darts	(Germany) 2022 PDC World Cup of Darts	International	Australia
16–19	Golf	(United States) 2022 U.S. Open	International	(England) Matt Fitzpatrick
16–19	Rhythmic gymnastics	(Israel) 2022 Rhythmic Gymnastics European Championships	Continental	Israel
16–7 July	Chess	(Spain) Candidates Tournament 2022	International	(FIDE) Ian Nepomniachtchi
17–19	Karate	(Czech Republic) 2022 European Junior Karate Championships	Continental	Spain
17–19	Rhythmic gymnastics	(Egypt) 2022 African Rhythmic Gymnastics Championships	Continental	Egypt
17–22	Fencing	(Turkey) 2022 European Fencing Championships	Continental	Italy
17–25	Multi-sport event	(Northern Mariana Islands) 2022 Pacific Mini Games	Regional	Papua New Guinea
18–19	Handball	(Germany) 2022 EHF Champions League Final Four	Continental	(Spain) Barcelona
18–21	Weightlifting	(Northern Mariana Islands) 2022 Oceania Weightlifting Championships	Continental	Australia
18–22	Track cycling	(India) 2022 Asian Track Cycling Championships	Continental	Japan
18–1 July	Association football	(Slovakia) 2022 UEFA European Under-19 Championship	Continental	England
18–3 July	Aquatic sports	(Hungary) 2022 World Aquatics Championships	International	United States
18–3 July	Association football	(Honduras) 2022 CONCACAF U-20 Championship	Continental	United States
19	Formula racing	(Canada) 2022 Canadian Grand Prix (F1 #9)^{†}	International	(Netherlands) Max Verstappen ( (Austria) Red Bull Racing-RBPT)
19	Motorcycle racing	(Germany) 2022 German motorcycle Grand Prix	International	MotoGP: (France) Fabio Quartararo ( (Japan) Monster Energy Yamaha MotoGP); Moto2: (Spain) Augusto Fernández ( (Finland) Red Bull KTM Ajo); Moto3: (Spain) Izan Guevara ( (Spain) Valresa GasGas Aspar Team)
20–30	Parachuting	(Austria) 2022 CISM World Military Parachuting Championship	International	France
21–26	3x3 basketball	(Belgium) 2022 FIBA 3x3 World Cup	International	Men: Serbia; Women: France
21–26	Beach handball	(Greece) 2022 Men's Beach Handball World Championships (Greece) 2022 Women's Beach Handball World Championships	International	Men: Croatia; Women: Germany
21–26	Squash	(Egypt) 2022 Men's PSA World Tour Finals (Egypt) 2022 Women's PSA World Tour Finals	International	Men: (Egypt) Mostafa Asal; Women: (Egypt) Nour El Sherbini
21–30	Handball	(India) 2022 Asian Men's Club League Handball Championship	Continental	Al-Kuwait SC
22–3 July	Handball	(Slovenia) 2022 Women's Junior World Handball Championship	International	Norway
22–26	Triathlon	(Canada) 2022 World Triathlon Sprint & Relay Championships	International	Men: (United Kingdom) Alex Yee; Women: (United Kingdom) Georgia Taylor-Brown; Mixed Relay: France
23	Basketball	(United States) 2022 NBA draft	Domestic	#1 pick: (North Carolina) Paolo Banchero
23–26	Canoe sprint	(Serbia) 2022 European Junior & U23 Canoe Sprint Championships	Continental	Hungary
23–26	Golf	(United States) 2022 Women's PGA Championship	International	(South Korea) Chun In-gee
23–26	Judo	(Croatia) 2022 European Cadet Judo Championships	Continental	France
23–26	Rallying	(Kenya) 2022 Safari Rally (WRC #6)	International	WRC: (Finland) Kalle Rovanperä & (Finland) Jonne Halttunen ( (Japan) Toyota Gazoo Racing WRT); WRC-2: (Poland) Kajetan Kajetanowicz & (Poland) Maciej Szczepaniak; WRC-3: (Kenya) Maxine Wahome & (Kenya) Murage Waigwa
23–26	Rhythmic gymnastics	(Thailand) 2022 Asian Rhythmic Gymnastics Championships	Continental	Uzbekistan
23–28	Table tennis	(Thailand) 2022 South East Asian Table Tennis Championships	Regional	Thailand
24–27	Taekwondo	(South Korea) 2022 Asian Taekwondo Championships	Continental	South Korea
24–30	Basketball	(Jordan) 2022 FIBA U16 Women's Asian Championship	Continental	Australia
24–5 July	Multi-sport event	(Colombia) 2022 Bolivarian Games	Regional	Colombia
25–2 July	Ice hockey	(Thailand) 2022 IIHF U20 Asia and Oceania Championship	Continental	Thailand
25–5 July	Multi-sport event	(Algeria) 2022 Mediterranean Games	International	Italy
26	Motocross racing	2022 MXGP Of Indonesia	International	Race 1 Winner: (Slovenia) Tim Gajser; Race 2 Winner: (Slovenia) Tim Gajser; Round Winner: (Slovenia) Tim Gajser
26	Motorcycle racing	(Netherlands) 2022 Dutch TT	International	MotoGP: (Italy) Francesco Bagnaia ( (Italy) Ducati Lenovo Team); Moto2: (Spain) Augusto Fernández ( (Finland) Red Bull KTM Ajo); Moto3: (Japan) Ayumu Sasaki ( (Italy) Sterilgarda Husqvarna Max); MotoE Race 1 : (Switzerland) Dominique Aegerter ( (Germany) Dynavolt Intact GP); MotoE Race 2 : (Brazil) Eric Granado ( (Monaco) LCR E-Team)
26–30	Handball	(Mexico) 2022 Nor.Ca. Men's Handball Championship	Continental	United States
26–30	Orienteering	(Denmark) 2022 World Orienteering Championships	International	Sweden
26–7 July	Universiade	(China) 2021 Summer World University Games	International	Postponed due COVID-19 to 2023
26–9 July	Association football	(Czech Republic) 2022 UEFA Women's Under-19 Championship	Continental	Spain
26–17 July	Gymnastics	(Brazil) 2022 Pan American Gymnastics Championships	Continental	United States
27–2 July	Canoe freestyle	(United Kingdom) 2022 Canoe Freestyle World Championships	International	United States
27–2 July	Softball	(Czech Republic) 2022 European Softball U-22 Women's Championship	Continental	Italy
27–3 July	Wrestling	(Italy) 2022 European Juniors Wrestling Championships	Continental	Ukraine
27–10 July	Tennis	(United Kingdom) 2022 Wimbledon Championships	International	Men: (Serbia) Novak Djokovic; Women: (Kazakhstan) Elena Rybakina
28–3 July	Basketball	(Malta) 2022 FIBA European Championship for Small Countries	Continental	Armenia
28–3 July	Basketball	(Cyprus) 2022 FIBA Women's European Championship for Small Countries	Continental	Cyprus
29–3 July	Multi-sport event	(Guadeloupe) 2022 Caribbean Games	Regional	Cuba
29–3 July	Artistic swimming	(Spain) 2022 European Junior Artistic Swimming Championships	Continental	Spain
29–9 July	Lacrosse	(United States) 2022 World Lacrosse Women's World Championship	International	United States
30–10 July	Road bicycle racing	(Italy) 2022 Giro Donne	International	(Netherlands) Annemiek van Vleuten ( (Spain) Movistar Team)

=== July ===
Date	Sport	Venue/Event	Status	Winner/s
1–3	Athletics	(Spain) 2022 European Athletics Off-Road Running Championships	Continental	Italy
1–3	Cheerleading	(Greece) 2022 European Cheerleading Championships	Continental	Slovenia
1–3	Fistball	(Austria) 2022 Women's European Fistball Championship	Continental	Cancelled
1–3	Futsal	(Portugal) UEFA Women's Futsal Euro 2022	Continental	Spain
1–10	Rugby union	(Australia) 2022 Oceania Rugby Under 20 Championship	Continental	New Zealand
1–10	Rugby union	(France) 2022 Rugby Africa Cup	Continental	Namibia
1–17	Field hockey	(Spain) / (Netherlands) 2022 Women's FIH Hockey World Cup	International	Netherlands
1–24	Road bicycle racing	2022 Tour de France (Grand Tour #2)	International	(Denmark) Jonas Vingegaard ( (Netherlands) Team Jumbo–Visma)
1–11 September	Beach soccer	(Portugal) 2022 Euro Beach Soccer League	Continental	Switzerland
2	Formula racing	(Morocco) 2022 Marrakesh ePrix (FE #10)	International	(Switzerland) Edoardo Mortara ( (Italy) ROKiT Venturi Racing)
2–10	Basketball	(Spain) 2022 FIBA Under-17 Basketball World Cup	International	United States
2–15	Association football	(Indonesia) 2022 AFF U-19 Youth Championship	Regional	Malaysia
2–16	Gliding	(Lithuania) 2022 FAI World 13,5 m Class Gliding Championship	International	(Netherlands) Nick Hanenburg
2–16	Rugby union	(Fiji) 2022 World Rugby Pacific Nations Cup	Regional	Samoa
2–17	Esports	2022 IIHF eWorld Championship	International	Finland
2–23	Association football	(Morocco) 2022 Women's Africa Cup of Nations	Continental	South Africa
3	Formula racing	(United Kingdom) 2022 British Grand Prix (F1 #10)	International	(Spain) Carlos Sainz Jr. ( (Italy) Ferrari)
3–11	Water polo	(Israel) LEN European U19 Women's Water Polo Championships	Continental	Spain
4–7	Athletics	(Israel) 2022 European Athletics U18 Championships	Continental	Great Britain
4–11	Volleyball	(Kazakhstan) 2022 Asian Women's U20 Volleyball Championship	Continental	Japan
4–17	Association football	(Philippines) 2022 AFF Women's Championship	Regional	Philippines
4–18	Association football	(Mexico) 2022 CONCACAF W Championship	Continental	United States
5–10	Canoe slalom	(Italy) 2022 World Junior and U23 Canoe Slalom Championships	International	France
5–10	Swimming	(Romania) 2022 European Junior Swimming Championships	Continental	Hungary
5–17	Association football	(South Africa) 2022 COSAFA Cup	Regional	Zambia
6–10	3x3 basketball	(Singapore) 2022 FIBA 3x3 Asia Cup	Continental	Men: Australia; Women: China
6–31	Association football	(England) UEFA Women's Euro 2022^{†}	Continental	England
7–8	Ice hockey	(Canada) 2022 NHL entry draft	Domestic	#1 pick: (Slovakia) Juraj Slafkovský
7–17	Handball	(Portugal) 2022 European Men's Under-20 Handball Championship	Continental	Spain
7–17	Multi-sport event	(United States) 2022 World Games	International	Germany
8–11	Artistic gymnastics	(Egypt) 2022 African Artistic Gymnastics Championships	Continental	Egypt
8–16	Basketball	(Hungary) 2022 FIBA U20 Women's European Championship	Continental	Spain
8–30	Association football	(Colombia) 2022 Copa América Femenina	Continental	Brazil
9–17	Basketball	(Hungary) 2022 FIBA Under-17 Women's Basketball World Cup	International	United States
10	Draughts	(Latvia) 2022 Draughts World Championship Blitz	International	Men: (Netherlands) Roel Boomstra; Women: (Poland) Natalia Sadowska
10	Endurance racing	(Italy) 2022 6 Hours of Monza (WEC #4)	International	Hypercar: (France) Nicolas Lapierre, (Brazil) André Negrão & (France) Matthieu Vaxivière ( (France) Alpine Elf Team); LMP2: (Angola) Rui Andrade, (Austria) Ferdinand Habsburg & (France) Norman Nato ( (Switzerland) RealTeam by WRT); LMGTE Pro: (United States) Tommy Milner & (United Kingdom) Nick Tandy ( (United States) Corvette Racing); LMGTE Am: (United Kingdom) Sebastian Priaulx, (Germany) Christian Ried & (United Kingdom) Harry Tincknell ( (Germany) Dempsey-Proton Racing)
10	Formula racing	(Austria) 2022 Austrian Grand Prix (F1 #11)	International	(Monaco) Charles Leclerc ( (Italy) Ferrari)
11–18	Handball	(Egypt) 2022 African Men's Handball Championship	Continental	Egypt
12–17	Volleyball	(Italy) 2022 Women's U21 European Volleyball Championship	Continental	Italy
12–24	Basketball	(Indonesia) 2022 FIBA Asia Cup	Continental	Australia
12–25	Multi-sport event	(Israel) 2022 Maccabiah Games	International	Israel
13–17	Basketball	(Cuba) 2022 Caribbean Women's Basketball Championship	Regional	Cuba
13–30	Association football	(Fiji) 2022 OFC Women's Nations Cup	Continental	Papua New Guinea
14–17	Beach volleyball	(Turkey) 2022 European U20 Beach Volleyball Championships	Continental	Men: (Austria) Timo Hammarberg & (Austria) Tim Berger; Women: (Ukraine) Anhelina Khmil & (Ukraine) Tetiana Lazarenko
14–17	Golf	(Scotland) 2022 Open Championship	International	(Australia) Cameron Smith
14–17	Rallying	2022 Rally Estonia (WRC #7)	International	WRC: (Finland) Kalle Rovanperä & (Finland) Jonne Halttunen ( (Japan) Toyota Gazoo Racing WRT); WRC-2: (Norway) Andreas Mikkelsen & (Norway) Torstein Eriksen ( (Germany) Toksport WRT); WRC-3: (Finland) Sami Pajari & (Finland) Enni Mälkönen
14–17	Esports	(Denmark) 2022 FIFAe World Cup	International	(Germany) Umut Gültekin
14–19	Cycling	(Portugal) 2022 UEC European Track Championships (under-23 & junior)	Continental	Italy
15–20	Orienteering	(Sweden) 2022 World MTB Orienteering Championships	International	Finland
15–23	Fencing	(Egypt) 2022 World Fencing Championships	International	France
15–24	Athletics	(United States) 2022 World Athletics Championships	International	United States
15–24	Handball	(Bahrain) 2022 Asian Men's Junior Handball Championship	Continental	Japan
15–25	Weightlifting	(Uzbekistan) 2022 Asian Youth & Junior Weightlifting Championships	Continental	Uzbekistan
16–17	Motorcycle racing	(United Kingdom) 2022 WSBK UK Round	International	R1: (Turkey) Toprak Razgatlıoğlu ( (Japan) Pata Yamaha with Brixx WorldSBK); SR: (Turkey) Toprak Razgatlıoğlu ( (Japan) Pata Yamaha with Brixx WorldSBK); R2: (Turkey) Toprak Razgatlıoğlu ( (Japan) Pata Yamaha with Brixx WorldSBK)
16–17	Formula racing	(United States) 2022 New York City ePrix (FE #11/12)	International	Race 1: (New Zealand) Nick Cassidy ( (United Kingdom) Envision Racing); Race 2: (Portugal) António Félix da Costa ( (France) DS Techeetah)
16–24	Basketball	(Montenegro) 2022 FIBA U20 European Championship	Continental	Spain
16–24	Darts	(England) 2022 World Matchplay	International	Michael van Gerwen
16–24	Volleyball	(Czech Republic) 2022 Girls' U17 Volleyball European Championship	Continental	Italy
17	Motocross racing	2022 MXGP of Czech Republic	International	Race 1 Winner: (Switzerland) Jeremy Seewer; Race 2 Winner: (France) Maxime Renaux; Round Winner: (Switzerland) Jeremy Seewer
17–30	Multi-sport event	(Poland) 2022 European Universities Games	Continental	(Turkey) Yeditepe University
18–23	Parachuting	(Czech Republic) 2022 FAI World Freefall Style and Accuracy Landing Championships	International	France
18–24	Diving	(Romania) 2022 European Junior Diving Championships	Continental	Italy
19	Baseball	(United States) 2022 Major League Baseball All-Star Game	Domestic	American League
19–23	Orienteering	(Poland) 2022 World Trail Orienteering Championships	International	Czech Republic
19–27	Association football	(Japan) 2022 EAFF E-1 Football Championship (Japan) 2022 EAFF E-1 Women's Football Championship	Regional	Men: Japan; Women: Japan
20–23	Finswimming	(Colombia) 2022 Finswimming World Championships	International	Hungary
20–24	Karate	(Uzbekistan) 2022 Asian Karate Championships	Continental	Postponed to 16–20 December 2022
21–24	Golf	(France) 2022 Evian Championship	International	(Canada) Brooke Henderson
21–31	Amateur boxing	2022 European Women's Boxing Championships	Continental	Postponed to October 2022
22–30	Weightlifting	(Colombia) 2022 Pan American Weightlifting Championships	Continental	Colombia
22–31	Multi-sport event	(Netherlands) 2021 World Police and Fire Games	International	Thailand
22–4 August	Association football	(Indonesia) 2022 AFF U-18 Women's Championship	Regional	Australia
23–30	Air sports	(Norway) 2022 FAI F4 World Championships for Scale Model Aircraft	International	Switzerland
23–30	Air sports	(Czech Republic) 2022 FAI World Microlight Championships	International	Czech Republic
23–31	Modern pentathlon	(Egypt) 2022 World Modern Pentathlon Championships	International	South Korea
23–6 August	Gliding	(Hungary) 2022 FAI World Gliding Championships	International	Open: (Germany) Felipe Levin; 18 metre: (France) Christophe Abadie; 20 metre Multi-seat: (Czech Republic) Ivan Novák & Petr Krejčiřík
24	Darts	(England) 2022 Women's World Matchplay	International	(England) Fallon Sherrock
24	Formula racing	(France) 2022 French Grand Prix (F1 #12)	International	(Netherlands) Max Verstappen ( (Austria) Red Bull Racing-RBPT)
24	Motocross racing	2022 MXGP of Flanders	International	Race 1 Winner: (Netherlands) Brian Bogers; Race 2 Winner: (Netherlands) Glenn Coldenhoff; Round Winner: (Netherlands) Brian Bogers
24–30	Field hockey	(Belgium) 2022 Men's EuroHockey Junior Championship (Belgium) 2022 Women's EuroHockey Junior Championship	Continental	Men: Netherlands; Women: Germany
24–30	Multi-sport event	(Slovakia) 2022 European Youth Summer Olympic Festival	Continental	Italy
24–30	Softball	(Spain) 2022 Women's Softball European Championship	Continental	Netherlands
24–31	Road bicycle racing	2022 Tour de France Femmes	International	(Netherlands) Annemiek van Vleuten ( (Spain) Movistar Team)
25–30	Wakeboarding	(Italy) 2022 World Wakeboard Championships	International	Italy
25–30	Shooting	(Croatia) 2022 European 300 m Rifle Championships	Continental	Switzerland
25–31	Wrestling	(Italy) 2022 World Cadets Wrestling Championships	International	India
26–31	BMX racing	(France) 2022 UCI BMX World Championships	International	Men's: (Switzerland) Simon Marquart; Women's: (United States) Felicia Stancil
26–31	Canoe slalom	(Germany) 2022 ICF Canoe Slalom World Championships	International	Germany
26–6 August	Multi-sport event	(Thailand) 2022 ASEAN University Games	Regional	Thailand
27–30	Speedway	(Denmark) 2022 Speedway of Nations	International	Australia
27–31	Rowing	(Italy) 2022 World Rowing Junior Championships	International	Greece
27–31	Rowing	(Italy) 2022 World Rowing U23 Championships	International	Italy
28–31	Canoe marathon	(Denmark) 2022 Canoe Marathon European Championships	Continental	Hungary
28–5 August	Shotgun (shooting sports)	(Kazakhstan) 2022 Asian Shotgun Championships	Continental	China
28–8 August	American football	(Finland) 2022 IFAF Women's World Championship	International	United States
28–8 August	Multi-sport event	(England) 2022 Commonwealth Games	International	Australia
28–9 August	Chess	(India) 44th Chess Olympiad	International	Open: Uzbekistan; Women: Ukraine
30–31	Fistball	(Germany) 2022 Men's U21 European Fistball Championship	Continental	Germany
30–31	Fistball	(Germany) 2022 Men's U18 European Fistball Championship	Continental	Germany
30–31	Fistball	(Germany) 2022 Women's U18 European Fistball Championship	Continental	Germany
30–31	Motorcycle racing	(Czech Republic) 2022 WSBK Czech round	International	R1: (Spain) Álvaro Bautista ( (Italy) Aruba.it Racing-Ducati); SR: (Turkey) Toprak Razgatlıoğlu ( (Japan) Pata Yamaha with Brixx WorldSBK); R2: (Turkey) Toprak Razgatlıoğlu ( (Japan) Pata Yamaha with Brixx WorldSBK)
30–31	Formula racing	(United Kingdom) 2022 London ePrix (FE #13/14)	International	Race 1: (United Kingdom) Jake Dennis ( (United States) Avalanche Andretti Formula E); Race 2: (Brazil) Lucas di Grassi ( (Monaco) ROKiT Venturi Racing)
30–6 August	Multi-sport event	(Indonesia) 2022 ASEAN Para Games	Regional	Indonesia
30–7 August	Basketball	(Turkey) 2022 FIBA U18 European Championship	Continental	Spain
30–10 August	Handball	(North Macedonia) 2022 Women's Youth World Handball Championship	International	South Korea
31	Formula racing	(Hungary) 2022 Hungarian Grand Prix (F1 #13)	International	(Netherlands) Max Verstappen ( (Austria) Red Bull Racing-RBPT)
31–12 August	Association football	(Indonesia) 2022 AFF U-16 Youth Championship	Regional	Indonesia

=== August ===
Date	Sport	Venue/Event	Status	Winner/s
1–6	Basketball	(Argentina) 2022 South American Basketball Championship for Women	Continental	Brazil
1–6	Flying disc	(United States) 2022 World Overall Flying Disc Championships	International	United States
1–6	Athletics	(Colombia) 2022 World Athletics U20 Championships	International	United States
1–8	Water polo	(Serbia) 2022 FINA Women's Youth Water Polo World Championships	International	United States
2–7	Taekwondo	(Bulgaria) 2022 World Taekwondo Junior Championships	International	South Korea
2–9	Shooting	(France) 2021 World Running Target Championships	International	Ukraine
3–6	Baseball	(France) 2022 European Baseball Championship - Women	Continental	France
3–7	Canoe sprint	(Canada) 2022 ICF Canoe Sprint World Championships	International	Spain
3–7	Paracanoe	(Canada) 2022 ICF Paracanoe World Championships	International	Great Britain
4–7	Golf	(Scotland) 2022 Women's British Open	International	(South Africa) Ashleigh Buhai
4–7	Rallying	2022 Rally Finland (WRC #8)	International	WRC: (Estonia) Ott Tänak & (Estonia) Martin Järveoja ( (South Korea) Hyundai Shell Mobis WRT); WRC-2: (Finland) Emil Lindholm & (Finland) Reeta Hämäläinen ( (Germany) Toksport WRT 2); WRC-3: (Finland) Lauri Joona & (Finland) Tuukka Shemeikka
4–7	Judo	(Kazakhstan) 2022 Asian Judo Championships	Continental	Japan
4–13	Air sports	(Poland) 2022 FAI World Aerobatic Championships	International	France
4–15	Basketball	(Madagascar) 2022 FIBA U18 African Championship (Madagascar) 2022 FIBA U18 Women's African Championship	Continental	Men: Egypt; Women: Mali
5–13	Archery	(Estonia) 2022 World Field Archery Championships	International	Estonia
6–14	Basketball	(Greece) 2022 FIBA U18 Women's European Championship	Continental	Lithuania
6–14	Equestrian	(Denmark) 2022 FEI World Championships	International	Denmark
6–24 September	Rugby union	(Argentina) / (Australia) / (New Zealand) / (South Africa) 2022 Rugby Championship	International	New Zealand
7	Motorcycle racing	(United Kingdom) 2022 British motorcycle Grand Prix (MotoGP #12)	International	MotoGP: (Italy) Francesco Bagnaia ( (Italy) Ducati Lenovo Team); Moto2: (Spain) Augusto Fernández ( (Finland) Red Bull KTM Ajo); Moto3: (Italy) Dennis Foggia ( (Luxembourg) Leopard Racing)
7	Motocross racing	2022 MXGP of Sweden	International	Race 1 Winner: (France) Maxime Renaux; Race 2 Winner: (Switzerland) Jeremy Seewer; Round Winner: (Switzerland) Jeremy Seewer
7–13	Surfing	(Panama) 2022 Pan American Surf Games	Continental	Brazil
7–14	Volleyball	(Thailand) 2022 Asian Men's Volleyball Cup	Continental	China
8–14	Tennis	(Canada) 2022 Canadian Open	International	Men: (Spain) Pablo Carreño Busta; Women: (Romania) Simona Halep
9–14	Volleyball	(Canada) 2022 Men's Pan-American Volleyball Cup	Continental	Cuba
9–18	Multi-sport event	(Turkey) 2022 Islamic Solidarity Games	International	Turkey
9–20	Ice hockey	(Canada) 2022 World Junior Ice Hockey Championships	International	Canada
10	Association football	(Finland) 2022 UEFA Super Cup	Continental	(Spain) Real Madrid
10–13	Miniature golf	(Germany) 2022 World Minigolf Championships	International	Finland
10–14	Artistic swimming	(United States) 2022 FINA World Youth Artistic Swimming Championships	International	Japan
10–14	Judo	(Ecuador) 2022 World Judo Juniors Championships	International	Japan
10–14	Track cycling	(Peru) 2022 Pan American Track Cycling Championships	Continental	Canada
10–18	Weightlifting	(Poland) 2022 European Youth & U15 Weightlifting Championships	Continental	Turkey
10–28	Association football	(Costa Rica) 2022 FIFA U-20 Women's World Cup	International	Spain
11–13	BMX racing	(Germany) 2022 European BMX Championships	Continental	Men: (France) Anthony Jeanjean; Women: (Czech Republic) Iveta Miculyčová
11–14	Artistic gymnastics	(Germany) 2022 European Women's Artistic Gymnastics Championships	Continental	Italy
11–14	Canoe slalom	(Czech Republic) 2022 European Junior and U23 Canoe Slalom Championships	Continental	Czech Republic
11–14	Rowing	(Germany) 2022 European Rowing Championships	Continental	Great Britain
11–14	Para-cycling	(Canada) 2022 UCI Para-cycling Road World Championships	International	Netherlands
11–16	Multi-sport event	(United Kingdom) 2022 International Children's Games	International	(South Korea) Seoul
11–16	Track cycling	(Germany) 2022 UEC European Track Championships	Continental	Germany
11–18	Sport climbing	(Germany) 2022 IFSC Climbing European Championships	Continental	Slovenia
11-19	Water polo	(Serbia) 2022 FINA Men's Youth Water Polo World Championships	International	Hungary
11–21	Aquatics	(Italy) 2022 European Aquatics Championships	Continental	Italy
11–28	Golf	(United States) 2022 FedEx Cup Playoffs	International	St. Jude Championship: (United States) Will Zalatoris; BMW Championship: (United States) Patrick Cantlay; Tour Championship: (Northern Ireland) Rory McIlroy
12–14	Triathlon	(Germany) 2022 European Triathlon Championships	Continental	Men: (France) Léo Bergère; Women: (United Kingdom) Non Stanford
12–20	Basketball	(North Macedonia) 2022 FIBA U16 European Championship	Continental	Lithuania
13–14	Formula racing	(South Korea) 2022 Seoul ePrix (FE #15/16)	International	Race 1: (New Zealand) Mitch Evans ( (United Kingdom) Jaguar TCS Racing); Race 2: (Switzerland) Edoardo Mortara ( (Monaco) ROKiT Venturi Racing)
13–21	Table tennis	(Germany) 2022 European Table Tennis Championships	Continental	Men: (Germany) Dang Qiu; Women: (Austria) Sofia Polcanova
13–27	Gliding	(United Kingdom) 2022 FAI Women's World Gliding Championships	International	Germany
14	Motocross racing	2022 MXGP of Finland	International	Race 1 Winner: (Netherlands) Brian Bogers; Race 2 Winner: (Netherlands) Glenn Coldenhoff; Round Winner: (Netherlands) Glenn Coldenhoff
14–21	Road bicycle racing	(Germany) 2022 European Road Championships	Continental	Netherlands
15–21	Athletics	(Germany) 2022 European Athletics Championships	Continental	Germany
15–21	Beach volleyball	(Germany) 2022 European Beach Volleyball Championships	Continental	Men: (Sweden) David Åhman & Jonatan Hellvig; Women: (Latvia) Anastasija Kravčenoka & Tīna Graudiņa
15–21	Tennis	(United States) 2022 Cincinnati Masters	International	Men: (Croatia) Borna Ćorić; Women: (France) Caroline Garcia
15–21	Wrestling	(Bulgaria) 2022 World Junior Wrestling Championships	International	Japan
15–22	Volleyball	(Iran) 2022 Asian Boys' U18 Volleyball Championship	Continental	Japan
16–21	Canoe polo	(France) 2022 ICF Canoe Polo World Championships	International	Men: Germany; Women: Germany
17	Association football	(New Zealand) 2022 OFC Champions League Final	Continental	(New Zealand) Auckland City
17–20	Flying disc	(Croatia) 2022 World Team Disc Golf Championships	International	Estonia
17–21	Artistic gymnastics	(Peru) 2022 South American Artistic Gymnastics Championships	Continental	Brazil
17–27	Gliding	(France) 2022 FAI World Glider Aerobatic Championships	International	Hungary
17–27	Gliding	(France) 2022 FAI World Advanced Glider Aerobatic Championships	International	Czech Republic
18–21	Artistic gymnastics	(Germany) 2022 European Men's Artistic Gymnastics Championships	Continental	Great Britain
18–21	Canoe sprint	(Germany) 2022 Canoe Sprint European Championships	Continental	Hungary
18–21	Rallying	(Belgium) 2022 Ypres Rally (WRC #9)	International	WRC: (Estonia) Ott Tänak & (Estonia) Martin Järveoja ( (South Korea) Hyundai Shell Mobis WRT); WRC-2: (France) Stéphane Lefebvre & (France) Andy Malfoy; WRC-3: (Czech Republic) Jan Černý & (United Kingdom) Tom Woodburn
18–28	Baseball	(United States) 2022 Little League World Series	International	(Hawaii) Honolulu Little League
19–20	Korfball	(Morocco) 2022 World Beach Korfball Championship	International	Poland
19–20	Mountain biking	(Germany) 2022 European Mountain Bike Championships	Continental	Men: (United Kingdom) Tom Pidcock; Women: (France) Loana Lecomte
19–21	Athletics	(The Bahamas) 2022 NACAC Championships	Continental	United States
19–27	Basketball	(Portugal) 2022 FIBA U16 Women's European Championship	Continental	France
19–28	Multi-sport event	(Democratic Republic of the Congo) 2022 Jeux de la Francophonie	International	Postponed to 2023
19–29	Volleyball	(Mexico) 2022 Women's Pan-American Volleyball Cup	Continental	Dominican Republic
19–11 September	Road bicycle racing	(Spain) 2022 Vuelta a España (Grand Tour #3)	International	(Belgium) Remco Evenepoel ( (Belgium) Quick-Step Alpha Vinyl Team)
20	Professional boxing	(Saudi Arabia) Oleksandr Usyk vs Anthony Joshua II	International	(Ukraine) Oleksandr Usyk
20–27	Air sports	(Slovakia) 2022 FAI F3J World Championship for Model Gliders	International	Czech Republic
20–27	Air sports	(France) 2022 FAI World Precision Flight Championship	International	Poland
20–27	Handball	(Rwanda) 2022 African Men's Junior Handball Championship	Continental	Egypt
20–31	Handball	(Bahrain) 2022 Asian Men's Youth Handball Championship	Continental	South Korea
21	Association football	(Uruguay) 2022 Under-20 Intercontinental Cup	International	(Portugal) Benfica
21	Motorcycle racing	(Austria) 2022 Austrian motorcycle Grand Prix (MotoGP #13)	International	MotoGP: (Italy) Francesco Bagnaia ( (Italy) Ducati Lenovo Team); Moto2: (Japan) Ai Ogura ( (Japan) Idemitsu Honda Team Asia); Moto3: (Japan) Ayumu Sasaki ( (Italy) Sterilgarda Husqvarna Max); MotoE Race 1: (Brazil) Eric Granado ( (Monaco) LCR E-Team); MotoE Race 2: (Brazil) Eric Granado ( (Monaco) LCR E-Team)
24	Motocross racing	2022 MXGP of Charente-Maritime	International	Race 1 Winner: (Switzerland) Jeremy Seewer; Race 2 Winner: (Slovenia) Tim Gajser; Round Winner: (Slovenia) Tim Gajser
21–28	Basketball	(Iran) 2022 FIBA U18 Asian Championship	Continental	South Korea
21–29	Volleyball	(Philippines) 2022 Asian Women's Volleyball Cup	Continental	Japan
22–28	Badminton	(Japan) 2022 BWF World Championships	International	Men: (Denmark) Viktor Axelsen; Women: (Japan) Akane Yamaguchi
22–29	Volleyball	(Bahrain) 2022 Asian Men's U20 Volleyball Championship	International	Iran
23–27	Artistic swimming	(Canada) 2022 FINA World Junior Artistic Swimming Championships	International	Japan
23–27	Track cycling	(Israel) 2022 UCI Junior Track Cycling World Championships	International	Germany
23–28	3x3 basketball	(Hungary) 2022 FIBA 3x3 U18 World Cup	International	Men: France; Women: United States
24–27	Golf	(France) 2022 Espirito Santo Trophy	International	Sweden
24–28	Judo	(Bosnia and Herzegovina) 2022 World Judo Cadets Championships	International	France
24–28	Mountain biking	(France) 2022 UCI Mountain Bike World Championships	International	France
24–12 September	Shooting	(Cyprus) 2022 European Shotgun Championships	Continental	Italy
26–4 September	Para-athletics	(Japan) 2022 World Para Athletics Championships	International	Postponed to 2024
26–4 September	Ice hockey	(Denmark) 2022 IIHF Women's World Championship	International	Canada
26–11 September	Volleyball	(Poland) / (Slovenia) 2022 FIVB Volleyball Men's World Championship	International	Italy
27–28	Sambo	(Israel) 2022 World Beach Sambo Championships	International	FIAS Team
27–4 September	Volleyball	(North Macedonia) 2022 Women's U19 Volleyball European Championship	Continental	Italy
27–10 September	Water polo	(Croatia) 2022 Men's European Water Polo Championship (Croatia) 2022 Women's European Water Polo Championship	Continental	Men: Croatia; Women: Spain
27–11 September	Cricket (T20I)	(United Arab Emirates) 2022 Asia Cup	Continental	Sri Lanka
28	Formula racing	(Belgium) 2022 Belgian Grand Prix (F1 #14)	International	(Netherlands) Max Verstappen ( (Austria) Red Bull Racing-RBPT)
29–3 September	Volleyball	(Kyrgyzstan) 2022 Asian Men's Volleyball Challenge Cup	Continental	Kyrgyzstan
29–4 September	Association football	(Jordan) 2022 WAFF Women's Championship	Regional	Jordan
29–11 September	Tennis	(United States) 2022 U.S. Open	International	Men: (Spain) Carlos Alcaraz; Women: (Poland) Iga Świątek
30–4 September	Swimming	(Peru) 2022 FINA World Junior Swimming Championships	International	Japan
30–6 September	Handball	(Rwanda) 2022 African Men's Youth Handball Championship	Continental	Egypt
31–3 September	Golf	(France) 2022 Eisenhower Trophy	International	Italy
31–4 September	Canoe sprint	(Hungary) 2022 ICF World Junior and U23 Canoe Sprint Championships	International	Hungary
31–4 September	Fly casting	(Estonia) 2022 World Championship in Castingsport	International	Czech Republic
31–11 September	Association football	(South Africa) 2022 COSAFA Women's Championship	Regional	Zambia

=== September ===
Date	Sport	Venue/Event	Status	Winner/s
1–4	Dragon boat	(Czech Republic) 2022 ICF Dragon Boat World Championships	International	Czech Republic
1–4	Beach volleyball	(Greece) 2022 European U18 Beach Volleyball Championships	Continental	Men: Latvia; Women: Czech Republic
1–8	Weightlifting	(Morocco) 2022 African Youth & Junior Weightlifting Championships	Continental	Postponed
1–18	Basketball	(Czech Republic) / (Georgia (country)) / (Germany) / (Italy) EuroBasket 2022	Continental	Spain
2–11	Basketball	(Brazil) 2022 FIBA AmeriCup	Continental	Argentina
2–17	Bridge	(Poland) 2022 World Bridge Series	International	(United States) Team Nickell
3–4	Rowing	(Belgium) 2022 European Rowing U23 Championships	Continental	Romania
3–11	Netball	(Singapore) 2022 Asian Netball Championships	Continental	Sri Lanka
3–10 December	American football	(United States) 2022 NCAA Division I FBS football season	Domestic	
4	Formula racing	(Netherlands) 2022 Dutch Grand Prix (F1 #15)	International	(Netherlands) Max Verstappen ( (Austria) Red Bull Racing-RBPT)
4	Motorcycle racing	2022 San Marino and Rimini Riviera motorcycle Grand Prix (MotoGP #14)	International	MotoGP: (Italy) Francesco Bagnaia ( (Italy) Ducati Lenovo Team); Moto2: (Spain) Alonso López ( (Italy) Speed Up Racing); Moto3: (Italy) Dennis Foggia ( (Luxembourg) Leopard Racing); MotoE Race 1: (Italy) Mattia Casadei ( (Spain) Pons Racing 40); MotoE Race 2: (Italy) Matteo Ferrari ( (Italy) Gresini Racing MotoE)
4	Motocross racing	2022 MXGP of Turkey	International	Race 1 Winner: (France) Maxime Renaux; Race 2 Winner: (France) Maxime Renaux; Round Winner: (Slovenia) Tim Gajser
4–10	Futsal	(Spain) 2022 UEFA Under-19 Futsal Championship	Continental	Spain
5–11	Basketball	(India) 2022 FIBA Under-18 Women's Asian Championship	Continental	Australia
5–18	Sport shooting	(Poland) 2022 European 25/50 m Events Championships	Continental	Germany
6–11	Pool	(Austria) 2022 WPA World Teams Ten-ball Championship	International	Philippines
6–11	Pool	(Austria) 2022 WPA World Women's Ten-ball Championship	International	(Chinese Taipei) Tzu-Chien Wei
7–10	Deaf basketball	(Israel) 2022 DIBF 3×3 World Cup	International	Men: Slovenia; Women: Poland
7–24	Association football	(French Polynesia) 2022 OFC U-19 Championship	Continental	New Zealand
8	Surfing	(United States) 2022 World Surf League Finals	International	Men: (Brazil) Filipe Toledo; Women: (Australia) Stephanie Gilmore
8–11	Rallying	(Greece) 2022 Acropolis Rally (WRC #10)	International	WRC: (Belgium) Thierry Neuville & (Belgium) Martijn Wydaeghe ( (South Korea) Hyundai Shell Mobis WRT); WRC-2: (Finland) Emil Lindholm & (Finland) Reeta Hämäläinen ( (Germany) Toksport WRT 2); WRC-3: (Paraguay) Diego Dominguez Jr. & (Spain) Rogelio Peñate
8–8 January 2023	American football	(United States) 2022 NFL season	Domestic	(Missouri) Kansas City Chiefs
9–11	3x3 basketball	(Austria) 2022 FIBA 3x3 Europe Cup	Continental	Men: Serbia; Women: France
9–11	Rugby sevens	(South Africa) 2022 Rugby World Cup Sevens	International	Men: Fiji; Women: Australia
9–11	Skyrunning	(Italy) 2022 Skyrunning World Championships	International	Italy
10	Association football	(Morocco) 2022 CAF Super Cup	Continental	(Morocco) RS Berkane
10–11	Motorcycle racing	(France) 2022 WSBK French round	International	R1: (Turkey) Toprak Razgatlıoğlu ( (Japan) Pata Yamaha with Brixx WorldSBK); SR: (Turkey) Toprak Razgatlıoğlu ( (Japan) Pata Yamaha with Brixx WorldSBK); R2: (Spain) Álvaro Bautista ( (Italy) Aruba.it Racing-Ducati)
10–17	Air sports	(Czech Republic) 2022 FAI World Paramotor Slalom Championships	International	Poland
10–18	Wrestling	(Serbia) 2022 World Wrestling Championships	International	United States
10–18	Six-a-side football	(Hungary) 2022 Socca World Cup	International	Brazil
10–19	Baseball	(United States) 2021 U-18 Baseball World Cup	International	United States
10–25	Multi-sport event	(China) 2022 Asian Games	Continental	Postponed due to COVID-19 pandemic
11	Endurance racing	(Japan) 2022 6 Hours of Fuji (WEC #5)	International	Hypercar: (Japan) Sébastien Buemi, (New Zealand) Brendon Hartley & (Japan) Ryō Hirakawa ( (Japan) Toyota Gazoo Racing); LMP2: (Netherlands) Robin Frijns, (Indonesia) Sean Gelael & (Belgium) Dries Vanthoor ( (Belgium) WRT); LMGTE Pro: (United Kingdom) James Calado & (Italy) Alessandro Pier Guidi ( (Italy) AF Corse); LMGTE Am: (United States) Ben Keating, (Denmark) Marco Sørensen & (Portugal) Henrique Chaves ( (United Kingdom) TF Sport)
11	Formula racing	(Italy) 2022 Italian Grand Prix (F1 #16)	International	(Netherlands) Max Verstappen ( (Austria) Red Bull Racing-RBPT)
12–17	Amateur boxing	(Mozambique) 2022 African Amateur Boxing Championships	Continental	Mozambique
12–17	Finswimming	(Italy) 2022 Finswimming Open Water World Championships	International	Italy
13–18	Futsal	(Fiji) 2022 OFC Futsal Cup	Continental	New Zealand
13–19	Modern Pentathlon	(Hungary) 2022 European Modern Pentathlon Championships	Continental	Great Britain
14–17	TeamGym	(Luxembourg) 2022 European TeamGym Championships	Continental	Denmark
14–18	Beach volleyball	(Turkey) 2022 FIVB U19 Beach Volleyball World Championships	International	Men: (Latvia) Kristians Fokerots & (Latvia) Gustavs Auzins; Women: (Ukraine) Yeva Serdiuk & (Ukraine) Daria Romaniuk
14–18	Equestrianism	(Italy) 2022 World Eventing Championships	International	Individual: (United Kingdom) Yasmin Ingham; Team: Germany
14–18	Rhythmic gymnastics	(Bulgaria) 2022 Rhythmic Gymnastics World Championships	International	Italy
14–18	Table tennis	(Romania) 2022 European Under-21 Table Tennis Championships	Continental	Romania
14–18	Tug of war	(Netherlands) 2022 Tug of War World Outdoor Championship	International	Chinese Taipei
14–18	Volleyball	(Peru) 2022 Men's Junior South American Volleyball Championship	Continental	Brazil
15–18	Futsal	(Argentina) 2022 Futsal Finalissima	International	Portugal
15–18	Judo	(Czech Republic) 2022 European Junior Judo Championships	Continental	Turkey
16–18	Open water swimming	(Seychelles) 2022 FINA World Junior Open Water Swimming Championships	International	Hungary
16–18	Canoeing	(Poland) 2022 World University Canoe Championships	International	Poland
16–24	Surfing	(United States) 2022 ISA World Surfing Games	International	Men: (Japan) Kanoa Igarashi; Women: (United States) Kirra Pinkerton
17	Professional boxing	(United States) Canelo Álvarez vs. Gennady Golovkin III	International	(Mexico) Canelo Álvarez
17	Ultra running	(Italy) 2022 IAU 24 Hour European Championship	International	Men: (Lithuania) Aleksandr Sorokin; Women: (Poland) Patrycja Bereznowska
17–18	Mountain biking	(Denmark) 2022 UCI Mountain Bike Marathon World Championships	International	Men: (New Zealand) Sam Gaze; Women: (France) Pauline Ferrand-Prévot
17–25	Volleyball	(Italy) 2022 Men's U20 Volleyball European Championship	International	Italy
18	Motorcycle racing	(Spain) 2022 Aragon motorcycle Grand Prix (MotoGP #15)	International	MotoGP: (Italy) Enea Bastianini ( (Italy) Gresini Racing MotoGP); Moto2: (Spain) Pedro Acosta ( (Finland) Red Bull KTM Ajo); Moto3: (Spain) Izan Guevara ( (Spain) GasGas Aspar Team)
18–25	Road bicycle racing	(Australia) 2022 UCI Road World Championships	International	Great Britain
18–25	Rowing	(Czech Republic) 2022 World Rowing Championships	International	Great Britain
19–12 October	Shooting sports	(Croatia) 2022 World Shotgun Championships	International	Italy
20–22	Carom billiards	(Netherlands) 2022 UMB World Three-cushion Championship for Ladies	International	(Netherlands) Therese Klompenhouwer
20–25	Carom billiards	(Italy) 2022 UMB World Five-pins Championship	International	(Italy) Andrea Quarta
21–25	Equestrianism	(Italy) 2022 World Driving Championships	International	Individual: (Australia) Boyd Exell; Team: Netherlands
22–25	Golf	(United States) 2022 Presidents Cup	International	(United States) Team USA
22–25	Wheelchair handball	(Egypt) 2022 Wheelchair Handball World Championship	International	Brazil
22–1 October	Basketball	(Australia) 2022 FIBA Women's Basketball World Cup	International	United States
23-25	Tennis	(United Kingdom) 2022 Laver Cup	International	Team World
23–15 October	Volleyball	(Netherlands) / (Poland) 2022 FIVB Volleyball Women's World Championship	International	Serbia
24–25	Motorcycle racing	(Catalonia) 2022 WSBK Catalunya round	International	R1: (Spain) Álvaro Bautista ( (Italy) Aruba.it Racing-Ducati); SR: (Spain) Álvaro Bautista ( (Italy) Aruba.it Racing-Ducati); R2: (Spain) Álvaro Bautista ( (Italy) Aruba.it Racing-Ducati)
24–25	Motocross	(United States) 2022 Motocross des Nations	International	United States
25	Marathon	(Germany) 2022 Berlin Marathon (WMM #3)	International	Men: (Kenya) Eliud Kipchoge; Women: (Ethiopia) Tigist Assefa
25	Motorcycle racing	(Japan) 2022 Japanese motorcycle Grand Prix (MotoGP #15)	International	MotoGP: (Australia) Jack Miller ( (Italy) Ducati Lenovo Team); Moto2: (Japan) Ai Ogura ( (Japan) Idemitsu Honda Team Asia); Moto3: (Spain) Izan Guevara ( (Spain) AutoSolar GasGas Aspar Team)
25–2 October	Lifesaving	(Italy) 2022 Lifesaving World Championships	International	Australia
27–2 October	Rugby league	(Ghana) 2022 MEA Rugby League Championship	Continental	Ghana
27–8 October	Futsal	(Kuwait) 2022 AFC Futsal Asian Cup	Continental	Japan
29–2 October	Canoe marathon	(Portugal) 2022 ICF Canoe Marathon World Championships	International	Hungary
29–2 October	Paralympic shooting	(Italy) 2022 European Para Trap Championships	Continental	Italy
29–2 October	Rallying	2022 Rally New Zealand (WRC #11)	International	WRC: (Finland) Kalle Rovanperä & (Finland) Jonne Halttunen ( (Japan) Toyota Gazoo Racing WRT); WRC-2: (New Zealand) Hayden Paddon & (New Zealand) John Kennard
30–9 October	Table tennis	(China) 2022 World Team Table Tennis Championships	International	Men: China; Women: China

=== October ===
Date	Sport	Venue/Event	Status	Winner/s
1	Association football	(Argentina) 2022 Copa Sudamericana Final	Continental	(Ecuador) Independiente del Valle
1–3	Bodybuilding	(Lithuania) 2022 IFBB World Fit Model Championships	International	Lithuania
1–8	Volleyball	(Cuba) 2022 Men's Junior Pan-American Volleyball Cup	Continental	United States
1–15	Multi-sport event	(Paraguay) 2022 South American Games	Continental	Brazil
1–16	Cricket	(Bangladesh) 2022 Women's Twenty20 Asia Cup	Continental	India
2	Formula racing	2022 Singapore Grand Prix^{†} (F1 #17)	International	(Mexico) Sergio Pérez ( (Austria) Red Bull Racing-RBPT)
2	Horse racing	(France) 2022 Prix de l'Arc de Triomphe	International	Horse: (United Kingdom) Alpinista; Jockey: (United Kingdom) Luke Morris; Trainer: (United Kingdom) Mark Prescott
2	Marathon	(United Kingdom) 2022 London Marathon (WMM #4)	International	Men: (Kenya) Amos Kipruto; Women: (Ethiopia) Yalemzerf Yehualaw
2	Motorcycle racing	2022 Thailand motorcycle Grand Prix (MotoGP #17)	International	MotoGP: (Portugal) Miguel Oliveira ( (Austria) Red Bull KTM Factory Racing); Moto2: (Italy) Tony Arbolino ( (Belgium) Elf Marc VDS Racing Team); Moto3: (Italy) Dennis Foggia ( (Luxembourg) Leopard Racing)
2	Mountain biking	(Spain) 2022 UCI Mountain Bike Eliminator World Championships	International	Men: (France) Titouan Perrin-Ganier; Women: (Italy) Gaia Tormena
2–8	Air sports	(Denmark) 2022 FAI F3F World Championship for Model Gliders	International	Individual: (Austria) Philipp Stary; Team: Austria
2–9	Skateboarding	(Brazil) 2022 Park Skateboarding World Championships	International	Cancelled
3–9	Archery	(United States) 2022 World Archery Field Championships	International	Italy
3–9	Darts	(England) 2022 World Grand Prix	International	Michael van Gerwen
5–9	3x3 basketball	(Romania) 2022 FIBA 3x3 Under-23 World Cup	International	Men: Poland; Women: France
6–8	Triathlon	(United States) 2022 Ironman World Championship	International	Men: (Norway) Gustav Iden; Women: (United States) Chelsea Sodaro
6–13	Judo	(Uzbekistan) 2022 World Judo Championships	International	Japan
6–16	Weightlifting	(Bahrain) 2022 Asian Weightlifting Championships	Continental	China
7–9	Rowing	(United Kingdom) 2022 World Rowing Coastal Championships	International	Spain
8	Road bicycle racing	(Italy) 2022 Il Lombardia (Monument #5)	International	(Slovenia) Tadej Pogačar ( (United Arab Emirates) UAE Team Emirates)
8–9	Gravel cycling	(Italy) 2022 UCI Gravel World Championships	International	Men: (Belgium) Gianni Vermeersch; Women: (France) Pauline Ferrand-Prévot
8–9	Motorcycle racing	(Portugal) 2022 WSBK Portuguese round	International	R1: (Turkey) Toprak Razgatlıoğlu ( (Japan) Pata Yamaha with Brixx WorldSBK); SR: (Turkey) Toprak Razgatlıoğlu ( (Japan) Pata Yamaha with Brixx WorldSBK); R2: (Spain) Álvaro Bautista ( (Italy) Aruba.it Racing-Ducati)
8–12 November	Rugby union	(New Zealand) 2021 Rugby World Cup	International	New Zealand
9	Formula racing	(Japan) 2022 Japanese Grand Prix^{†} (F1 #18)	International	(Netherlands) Max Verstappen ( (Austria) Red Bull Racing-RBPT)
9	Marathon	(United States) 2022 Chicago Marathon (WMM #5)	International	Men: (Kenya) Benson Kipruto; Women: (Kenya) Ruth Chepngetich
9–15	Multi-sport event	(China) 2022 Asian Para Games	Continental	Postponed due to COVID-19 pandemic
9–16	Skateboarding	(Brazil) 2022 Street Skateboarding World Championships	International	Cancelled
10–16	Wheelchair rugby	(Denmark) 2022 IWRF World Championship	International	Australia
10–17	Parachuting	(United States) 2022 FAI World Canopy Piloting Championships	International	Overall Individual: (Canada) Sven Jseppi; Overall Team: France
10–17	Parachuting	(United States) 2022 FAI World Canopy Piloting Freestyle Championships	International	Overall Individual: (Argentina) Franco Darman; Overall Team: United States
10–17	Parachuting	(United States) 2022 FAI World Canopy Formation Championships	International	2-Way Sequential: France; 4-Way Sequential: Qatar; 4-Way Rotation: Qatar
10–17	Parachuting	(United States) 2022 FAI World Wingsuit Flight Championships	International	Overall Individual: (United States) Chris Geiler; Overall Team: United States
11–23	Chess	(Italy) World Junior Chess Championship 2022	International	Open: (Azerbaijan) Abdulla Gadimbayli; Girls: (Azerbaijan) Govhar Beydullayeva
11–30	Association football	(India) 2022 FIFA U-17 Women's World Cup	International	Spain
12–16	Track cycling	(France) 2022 UCI Track Cycling World Championships	International	Netherlands
12–27	Shooting	(Egypt) 2022 ISSF World Shooting Championships	International	China
13–28	Association football	(Ecuador) 2022 Copa Libertadores Femenina	Continental	(Brazil) Palmeiras
14–16	Parkour	(Japan) 2022 Parkour World Championships	International	Men's Freestyle: (Greece) Dimitrios Kyrsanidis; Men's Speed: (Ukraine) Bohdan Kolmakov; Women's Freestyle: (Mexico) Ella Bucio; Women's Speed: (Sweden) Miranda Tibbling
14–16	Rowing	(United Kingdom) 2022 World Rowing Beach Sprint Finals	International	Spain
14–22	Amateur boxing	(Montenegro) 2022 Women's European Amateur Boxing Championships	Continental	Ireland
15–22	Curling	(Scotland) 2022 World Mixed Curling Championship	International	Canada
15–25	Weightlifting	(Albania) 2022 European Junior & U23 Weightlifting Championships	Continental	Armenia
15–19 November	Rugby league	(England) 2021 Men's Rugby League World Cup	International	Australia
16	Motorcycle racing	(Australia) 2022 Australian motorcycle Grand Prix (MotoGP #18)	International	MotoGP: (Spain) Álex Rins ( (Japan) Team Suzuki Ecstar); Moto2: (Spain) Alonso López ( (Italy) Speed Up Racing); Moto3: (Spain) Izan Guevara ( (Spain) Gaviota GasGas Aspar Team)
16–13 November	Cricket	(Australia) 2022 ICC Men's T20 World Cup	International	England
17–23	Wrestling	(Spain) 2022 U23 World Wrestling Championships	International	Japan
17–30	Badminton	(Spain) 2022 BWF World Junior Championships	International	China
18	Basketball	(France) 2022 FIBA Europe SuperCup Women	Continental	(France) Tango Bourges Basket
18–23	Handball	(Saudi Arabia) 2022 IHF Men's Super Globe	International	(Germany) SC Magdeburg
18–23	Bodybuilding	(South Korea) 2022 IFBB World Fitness Championships	International	Ukraine
19–23	Weightlifting	(Peru) 2022 Pan-American Junior Weightlifting Championships (Peru) 2022 South American Junior & Youth Weightlifting Championships (Peru) 2022 South American U15 Weightlifting Championships	Continental	Colombia
19–27	Parachuting	(United States) 2022 FAI World Formation Skydiving Championships	International	4-Way Open: United States; 4-Way Female: United Kingdom; 4-Way Vertical Open: United States; 8-Way Open: United States
19–27	Parachuting	(United States) 2022 FAI World Artistic Events Championships	International	Freeflying: France; Freestyle: United States
19–27	Parachuting	(United States) 2022 FAI World Speed Skydiving Championships	International	Female: (Australia) Natisha Dingle; Male: (Germany) Marco Hepp; Team: United States; Open: (Germany) Marco Hepp
20–23	Rallying	(Spain) 2022 Rally Catalunya (WRC #12)	International	WRC: (France) Sébastien Ogier & (France) Benjamin Veillas ( (Japan) Toyota Gazoo Racing WRT); WRC-2: (Finland) Teemu Suninen & (Finland) Mikko Markkula ( (South Korea) Hyundai Motorsport N); WRC-3: (Finland) Lauri Joona & (Finland) Mikael Korhonen
20–23	Track cycling	(France) 2022 UCI Para-cycling Track World Championships	International	Great Britain
21–28	Beach soccer	(Mozambique) 2022 Africa Beach Soccer Cup of Nations	Continental	Senegal
22	Association football	(Malaysia) 2022 AFC Cup Final	Continental	(Oman) Al-Seeb
22–9 November	Jujutsu	(United Arab Emirates) 2022 Ju-Jitsu World Championships	International	United Arab Emirates
22–19 March 2023	Alpine skiing	(Austria) / (Canada) / (United States) / (France) / (Italy) / (Germany) / (Switzerland) / (Slovenia) / (Andorra) / (Croatia) / (Czech Republic) / (Norway) / (Sweden) 2022–23 FIS Alpine Ski World Cup	International	Men: (Switzerland) Marco Odermatt; Women: (United States) Mikaela Shiffrin
22–23	Motorcycle racing	(Argentina) 2022 WSBK Argentinean round	International	R1: (Spain) Álvaro Bautista ( (Italy) Aruba.it Racing-Ducati); SR: (Turkey) Toprak Razgatlıoğlu ( (Japan) Pata Yamaha with Brixx WorldSBK); R2: (Spain) Álvaro Bautista ( (Italy) Aruba.it Racing-Ducati)
23	Formula racing	2022 United States Grand Prix (F1 #19)	International	(Netherlands) Max Verstappen ( (Austria) Red Bull Racing-RBPT)
23	Motorcycle racing	(Malaysia) 2022 Malaysian motorcycle Grand Prix (MotoGP #19)	International	MotoGP: (Italy) Francesco Bagnaia ( (Italy) Ducati Lenovo Team); Moto2: (Italy) Tony Arbolino ( (Belgium) Elf Marc VDS Racing Team); Moto3: (United Kingdom) John McPhee ( (Italy) Sterilgarda Husqvarna Max)
23–30	Basque pelota	(France) 2022 Basque Pelota World Championships	International	Spain
24–13 November	Roller sports	(Argentina) 2022 World Skate Games	International	Colombia
25–30	Fischer random chess	(Iceland) FIDE World Fischer Random Chess Championship 2022	International	(United States) Hikaru Nakamura
26–30	Karate	(Turkey) 2022 U21, Junior & Cadet World Championships	International	Japan
26–30	Motorsport	(France) 2022 FIA Motorsport Games	International	Italy
26–2 November	Association football	(Honduras) / (Costa Rica) 2022 CONCACAF League Final	Continental	(Honduras) Olimpia
27–30	Darts	(Germany) 2022 European Championship	International	Ross Smith
27–30	Rowing	(Spain) 2022 European Rowing Coastal & Beach Sprint Championships	Continental	Spain
28	Triathlon	(United States) 2022 Ironman 70.3 World Championship	International	Men: (Norway) Kristian Blummenfelt; Women: (United States) Taylor Knibb
28–30	Judo	(Bosnia and Herzegovina) 2022 European U23 Judo Championships	Continental	Turkey
28–31	Weightlifting	(Egypt) 2022 African Weightlifting Championships	Continental	Egypt
28–5 November	Baseball	(United States) 2022 World Series	Domestic	(Texas) Houston Astros
28–6 November	SUP & Paddleboarding	(Puerto Rico) 2022 ISA World SUP and Paddleboard Championship	International	United States
29	Association football	(Ecuador) 2022 Copa Libertadores Final	Continental	(Brazil) Flamengo
29–6 November	Artistic gymnastics	(United Kingdom) 2022 World Artistic Gymnastics Championships	International	United States
30	Formula racing	2022 Mexico City Grand Prix (F1 #20)	International	(Netherlands) Max Verstappen ( (Austria) Red Bull Racing-RBPT)
31–6 November	Curling	(Canada) 2022 Pan Continental Curling Championships	International	Men: Canada; Women: Japan
31–6 November	Ringette	(Finland) 2022 World Ringette Championships	International	Senior Pool: Finland; Junior Pool: Finland; President's Pool: United States
31–6 November	Snooker	(England) 2022 Champion of Champions	International	(England) Ronnie O'Sullivan
31–6 November	Table tennis	(Chile) 2022 Pan American Table Tennis Championships	Continental	Men: (Brazil) Hugo Calderano; Women: (Puerto Rico) Adriana Díaz
31–6 November	Tennis	(France) 2022 Paris Masters	International	(Denmark) Holger Rune
31–7 November	Tennis	(United States) 2022 WTA Finals	International	Singles: (France) Caroline Garcia; Doubles: Veronika Kudermetova / (Belgium) Elise Mertens

=== November ===
Date	Sport	Venue/Event	Status	Winner/s
1	Horse racing	(Australia) 2022 Melbourne Cup	International	Horse: (France) Gold Trip; Jockey: (Australia) Mark Zahra; Trainer: (Australia) Ciaron Maher & (United Kingdom) David Eustace
1–6	Beach soccer	(United Arab Emirates) 2022 Beach Soccer Intercontinental Cup	International	Iran
1–12	Amateur boxing	(Jordan) 2022 Asian Amateur Boxing Championships	Continental	Kazakhstan
1–19	Rugby league	(England) 2021 Women's Rugby League World Cup	International	Australia
3–6	3x3 basketball	(United States) 2022 FIBA 3x3 AmeriCup	Continental	Men: United States; Women: Canada
3–18	Wheelchair rugby league	(England) 2021 Wheelchair Rugby League World Cup	International	England
4–5	Horse racing	(United States) 2022 Breeders' Cup	International	Breeders' Cup Classic: Horse: (United States) Flightline; Jockey: (France) Flavien Prat; Trainer: (United States) John W. Sadler
4–6	Indoor cycling	(Belgium) 2022 UCI Indoor Cycling World Championships	International	Germany
4–19	Multi-sport event	(El Salvador) 2022 Central American Games	Regional	Cancelled
4–20	Handball	(Slovenia) / (North Macedonia) / (Montenegro) 2022 European Women's Handball Championship	Continental	Norway
4–23 March 2023	Ski jumping	(Poland) / (Finland) / (Norway) / (Germany) / (Switzerland) / (Austria) / (Slovenia) / (Japan) / (Romania) / (United States) 2022–23 FIS Ski Jumping World Cup	International	
5–6	Cyclo-cross	(Belgium) 2022 UEC European Cyclo-cross Championships	Continental	Men: (Belgium) Michael Vanthourenhout; Women: (Netherlands) Fem van Empel
5–6	Netball	(New Zealand) 2022 Fast5 Netball World Series	International	Australia
5–6	Wrestling	(Azerbaijan) 2022 Wrestling World Cup - Men's Greco-Roman	International	Iran
5–10	Archery	(South Africa) 2022 African Archery Championships	Continental	South Africa
5–13	Floorball	(Switzerland) 2022 Men's World Floorball Championships	International	Sweden
6	Marathon	(United States) 2022 New York City Marathon (WMM #6)	International	Men: (Kenya) Evans Chebet; Women: (Kenya) Sharon Lokedi
6	Motorcycle racing	(Spain) 2022 Valencian Community motorcycle Grand Prix (MotoGP #20)	International	MotoGP: (Spain) Álex Rins ( (Japan) Team Suzuki Ecstar); Moto2: (Spain) Pedro Acosta ( (Finland) Red Bull KTM Ajo); Moto3: (Spain) Izan Guevara ( (Spain) Valresa GasGas Aspar Team)
6–12	Para table tennis	(Spain) 2022 World Para Table Tennis Championships	International	South Korea
6–17	Paralympic shooting	(United Arab Emirates) 2022 World Shooting Para Sport Championships	International	Ukraine
7–13	Baseball5	(Mexico) 2022 Baseball5 World Cup	International	Cuba
7–14	Water polo	(Thailand) 2022 Asian Water Polo Championship	Continental	Men: Japan; Women: China
8–12	Handball	(Argentina) 2022 South and Central American Men's Junior Handball Championship (Argentina) 2022 South and Central American Men's Youth Handball Championship	Continental	Junior: Brazil; Youth: Argentina
8–12	Tennis	(Italy) 2022 Next Generation ATP Finals	International	(United States) Brandon Nakashima
8–13	Freestyle BMX	(United Arab Emirates) 2022 UCI Urban Cycling World Championships	International	Spain
8–13	Tennis	(United Kingdom) 2022 Billie Jean King Cup Finals	International	Switzerland
9–13	Carom billiards	(South Korea) 2022 UMB World Three-cushion Championship	International	(Turkey) Tayfun Taşdemir
9–19	Handball	(Senegal) 2022 African Women's Handball Championship	Continental	Angola
10–12	Short-track speed skating	(United States) 2023 Four Continents Short Track Speed Skating Championships	International	South Korea
10–13	Rallying	2022 Rally Japan (WRC #13)	International	WRC: (Belgium) Thierry Neuville & (Belgium) Martijn Wydaeghe ( (South Korea) Hyundai Shell Mobis WRT); WRC-2: (Luxembourg) Grégoire Munster & (Belgium) Louis Louka
11–13	Sambo	(Kyrgyzstan) 2022 World Sambo Championships	International	FIAS Team (Russia)
12	Endurance racing	2022 8 Hours of Bahrain (WEC #6)	International	Hypercar: (United Kingdom) Mike Conway, (Japan) Kamui Kobayashi & (Argentina) José María López ( (Japan) Toyota Gazoo Racing); LMP2: (Netherlands) Robin Frijns, (Indonesia) Sean Gelael & (Germany) René Rast ( (Belgium) WRT); LMGTE Pro: (Italy) Antonio Fuoco & (Spain) Miguel Molina ( (Italy) AF Corse); LMGTE Am: (Italy) Matteo Cairoli, (Switzerland) Nicolas Leutwiler & (Denmark) Mikkel O. Pedersen ( (Germany) Team Project 1)
12	Judo	(France) 2022 European Mixed Team Judo Championships	Continental	France
12–13	Motorcycle racing	(Indonesia) 2022 WSBK Indonesian round	International	R1: (Turkey) Toprak Razgatlıoğlu ( (Japan) Pata Yamaha with Brixx WorldSBK); SR: (Turkey) Toprak Razgatlıoğlu ( (Japan) Pata Yamaha with Brixx WorldSBK); R2: (Turkey) Toprak Razgatlıoğlu ( (Japan) Pata Yamaha with Brixx WorldSBK)
12–19	Multi-sport event	(Hong Kong) 2022 Gay Games	International	Postponed to November 2023
12–20	Darts	(England) 2022 Grand Slam of Darts	International	(England) Michael Smith
12–20	Snooker	(England) 2022 UK Championship (Triple Crown #1)	International	(Northern Ireland) Mark Allen
13	Association football	(Morocco) 2022 CAF Women's Champions League Final	Continental	(Morocco) AS FAR
13	Athletics	(China) 2022 World Athletics Half Marathon Championships	International	Cancelled due to COVID-19 pandemic
13	Formula racing	(Brazil) 2022 São Paulo Grand Prix (F1 #21)	International	(United Kingdom) George Russell ( (Germany) Mercedes)
13–19	Air sports	(South Africa) 2022 FAI World Rally Flying Championship	International	Pilot: (Poland) Krzysztof Wieczorek; Navigator: (Poland) Kamil Wieczorek
13–20	Taekwondo	(Mexico) 2022 World Taekwondo Championships	International	Mexico
13–20	Tennis	(Italy) 2022 ATP Finals	International	Singles: (Serbia) Novak Djokovic; Doubles: (United States) Rajeev Ram / (United Kingdom) Joe Salisbury
14–20	Powerlifting	(Denmark) 2022 World Equipped Open Powerlifting Championships	International	Ukraine
14–26	Amateur boxing	(Spain) 2022 IBA Youth World Boxing Championships	International	Uzbekistan
15–19	Handball	(Argentina) 2022 South and Central American Women's Handball Championship	Continental	Brazil
16–19	Trampoline gymnastics	(Bulgaria) 2022 Trampoline Gymnastics World Championships	International	Great Britain
16–27	Wheelchair basketball	(United Arab Emirates) 2022 Wheelchair Basketball World Championship	International	Postponed until 9 – 20 June 2023
17–19	Table tennis	(Thailand) 2022 ITTF-ATTU Asian Cup	Continental	Men: (Japan) Tomokazu Harimoto; Women: (China) Wang Yidi
17–20	Golf	(United States) 2022 CME Group Tour Championship	International	(New Zealand) Lydia Ko
18–20	Acrobatic gymnastics	(Colombia) 2022 Pan American Acrobatic Gymnastics Championships	Continental	United States
18–26	Curling	(Sweden) 2022 European Curling Championships	Continental	Men: Scotland; Women: Denmark
19–20	Motorcycle racing	(Australia) 2022 WSBK Australian round	International	R1: (United Kingdom) Jonathan Rea ( (Japan) Kawasaki Racing Team WorldSBK); SR: (Spain) Álvaro Bautista ( (Italy) Aruba.it Racing – Ducati); R2: (Spain) Álvaro Bautista ( (Italy) Aruba.it Racing – Ducati)
19–26	Chess	(Israel) World Team Chess Championship 2022	International	China
19–26	Multi-sport event	(Colombia) 2022 Central American and Caribbean Beach Games	Regional	Venezuela
20	Formula racing	(United Arab Emirates) 2022 Abu Dhabi Grand Prix (F1 #22)	International	(Netherlands) Max Verstappen ( (Austria) Red Bull Racing-RBPT)
20–18 December	Association football	(Qatar) 2022 FIFA World Cup	International	Argentina
21–25	Weightlifting	(Guatemala) 2022 Pan-American Youth Weightlifting Championships (Guatemala) 2022 Pan-American U15 Weightlifting Championships	Continental	Colombia
21–27	Archery	(Chile) 2022 Pan American Archery Championships	Continental	United States
22–27	Tennis	(Spain) 2022 Davis Cup Finals	International	Canada
23–27	Basketball	(Chile) 2022 South American U15 Women's Basketball Championship	Continental	Argentina
23–27	Teqball	(Germany) 2022 Teqball World Championships	International	Hungary
23–29	Multi-sport event	(Portugal) 2022 IWAS World Games	International	United Arab Emirates
24–26	Triathlon & Paratriathlon	(United Arab Emirates) 2022 World Triathlon Championship Finals	International	Men: (France) Léo Bergère; Women: (Bermuda) Flora Duffy; Para-triathlon: France
24–4 December	Handball	(South Korea) 2022 Asian Women's Handball Championship	Continental	South Korea
25–27	Aesthetic group gymnastics	(Austria) 2022 World Aesthetic Gymnastics Championships	International	Finland
25–27	Darts	(England) 2022 Players Championship Finals	International	(Netherlands) Michael van Gerwen
25–27	Rugby league	(Colombia) 2022 South American Rugby League Championship	Continental	Brazil
25–29	Sepak takraw	(South Korea) 2022 ISTAF World Cup	International	Thailand
25–4 December	Diving	(Canada) 2022 FINA World Junior Diving Championships	International	Canada
25–26 March 2023	Cross-country skiing	(Finland) / (Norway) / (Switzerland) / (Germany) / (Italy) / (France) / (Slovenia) / (Sweden) / (Estonia) 2022–23 FIS Cross-Country World Cup	International	Men: (Norway) Johannes Høsflot Klæbo; Women: (Norway) Tiril Udnes Weng
26–4 December	Softball	(New Zealand) 2022 Men's Softball World Championship	International	Australia
27	Darts	(England) 2022 PDC World Youth Championship	International	(Northern Ireland) Josh Rock
28–4 December	Field hockey	(South Africa) 2022 Men's FIH Hockey Nations Cup	International	South Africa
28–4 December	Karate	(South Africa) 2022 African Karate Championships	Continental	Egypt
28–4 December	Rhythmic gymnastics	(Colombia) 2022 South American Rhythmic Gymnastics Championships	Continental	Brazil
29–4 December	Wheelchair fencing	(Poland) 2022 IWAS Wheelchair Fencing European Championships	Continental	Great Britain
30–3 December	Pool	(United States) 2022 Mosconi Cup	International	Team Europe

=== December ===
Date	Sport	Venue/Event	Status	Winner/s
2–4	Speed skating	(Canada) 2023 Four Continents Speed Skating Championships	International	Canada
2–12	Wushu	(Indonesia) 2022 World Junior Wushu Championships	International	Iran
3–4	3x3 basketball	(Egypt) 2022 FIBA 3x3 Africa Cup	Continental	Men: Madagascar; Women: Egypt
3–4	Track cycling	(United Kingdom) 2022 UCI Track Champions League Final	International	Men's Sprint: (Australia) Matthew Richardson; Men's Endurance: (Switzerland) Claudio Imhof; Women's Sprint: (France) Mathilde Gros; Women's Endurance: (United States) Jennifer Valente
4–11	Surfing	(United States) 2022 ISA World Para Surfing Championships	International	United States
4–11	Table tennis	(Tunisia) 2022 ITTF World Youth Championships	International	China
5–13	Boccia	(Brazil) 2022 World Boccia Championships	International	Australia
5–16	Weightlifting	(Colombia) 2022 World Weightlifting Championships	International	China
5–16	Goalball	(Portugal) 2022 Goalball World Championships	International	Men: Brazil; Women: Turkey
7–11	Badminton	(Thailand) 2022 BWF World Tour Finals	International	Men: (Denmark) Viktor Axelsen; Women: (Japan) Akane Yamaguchi
7–11	Indoor hockey	(Germany) 2022 Men's EuroHockey Indoor Championship (Germany) 2022 Women's EuroHockey Indoor Championship	Continental	Men: Austria; Women: Germany
7–11	Volleyball	(Brazil) 2022 FIVB Volleyball Men's Club World Championship	International	(Italy) Sir Safety Susa Perugia
8–10	Taekwondo	(Saudi Arabia) 2022 World Taekwondo Grand Prix Final	International	South Korea
8–11	Figure skating	(Italy) 2022–23 Grand Prix of Figure Skating Final	International	Japan
10–11	3x3 basketball	(United Arab Emirates) 2022 FIBA 3x3 World Tour Finals	International	(Serbia) Ub Huishan NE
10–11	Wrestling	(United States) 2022 Wrestling World Cup - Men's freestyle (United States) 2022 Wrestling World Cup - Women's freestyle	International	Men: United States; Women: Ukraine
10–16	Squash	(Egypt) 2022 Women's World Team Squash Championships	International	Egypt
10–17	Field hockey	(Spain) 2022 Women's FIH Hockey Nations Cup	International	India
10–17	Rugby union	(Hong Kong) 2022 Asia Rugby Women's Championship	Continental	Hong Kong
11	Athletics	(Italy) 2022 European Cross Country Championships	Continental	Men: (Norway) Jakob Ingebrigtsen; Women: (Norway) Karoline Bjerkeli Grøvdal
12–17	Handball	(Mexico) 2022 North America and Caribbean Men's Junior Handball Championship	Continental	Cuba
13–18	Swimming	(Australia) 2022 FINA World Swimming Championships (25 m)	International	United States
14–16	Esports	(Japan) / (Brazil) / (United Arab Emirates) 2022 Formula One Esports Series Grand Final	International	(United Kingdom) Lucas Blakeley
14–18	Volleyball	(Turkey) 2022 FIVB Volleyball Women's Club World Championship	International	(Italy) Imoco Volley Conegliano
15–3 January 2023	Darts	(England) 2023 PDC World Darts Championship	International	(England) Michael Smith
16–18	Tennis	(United Arab Emirates) 2022 World Tennis Championship	International	Men: (Greece) Stefanos Tsitsipas; Women: (Tunisia) Ons Jabeur
16–20	Karate	(Uzbekistan) 2022 Asian Karate Championships	Continental	Japan
17–18	Draughts	(Poland) 2022 Draughts World Championship Rapid	International	Men: (Netherlands) Jitse Slump; Women: (Russia) Darya Tkachenko
20–22	Judo	(Israel) 2022 Judo World Masters	International	Japan
20–28	Multi-sport event	(China) 2021 Asian Youth Games^{†}	Continental	Cancelled
20–16 January 2023	Association football	(ASEAN) 2022 AFF Championship	Regional	Thailand
26–28	Chess	(Kazakhstan) World Rapid Chess Championship 2022	International	Open: (Norway) Magnus Carlsen; Women: (China) Tan Zhongyi
26–4 January 2023	Ice hockey	(Canada) 2023 World Junior Ice Hockey Championships	International	Canada
28–6 January 2023	Ski jumping	(Germany) / (Austria) 2022–23 Four Hills Tournament	International	(Norway) Halvor Egner Granerud
29–30	Chess	(Kazakhstan) World Blitz Chess Championship 2022	International	Open: (Norway) Magnus Carlsen; Women: (Kazakhstan) Bibisara Assaubayeva
29–8 January 2023	Tennis	(Australia) 2023 United Cup	International	United States
31–8 January 2023	Cross-country skiing	(Switzerland) / (Germany) / (Italy) 2022–23 Tour de Ski	International	Men: (Norway) Johannes Høsflot Klæbo; Women: (Sweden) Frida Karlsson
31–15 January 2023	Rally raid	(Saudi Arabia) 2023 Dakar Rally	International	Bikes: (Argentina) Kevin Benavides; Quads: (France) Alexandre Giroud; Cars: (Qatar) Nasser Al-Attiyah; Light Proto: (United States) Austin Jones; SSV: (Poland) Eryk Goczał; Trucks: (Netherlands) Janus van Kasteren
