= Caribbean Games =

Regional multisports championship event

- Abbreviation: CG
- Purpose: Sports for Caribbean people
- Inaugurated: June 29 to July 3, 2022
- Next event: Oranjestad 2027

The Caribbean Games are a multi-sport regional championship event. The games are for countries in the Caribbean, Central American country Belize and South American Caribbean countries Guyana, Suriname, and French Guiana.

The games are overseen by the Caribbean Association of National Olympic Committees (CANOC).

The first edition of the Caribbean Games was held in Guadeloupe between June 29 to July 3, 2022.

== History ==
The concept of Caribbean Games emerged in 1999 with a proposal from the government of Trinidad and Tobago submitted to CARICOM to imagine a regional competition space reserved for small Caribbean nations.

The proposal was rejected but resurfaced fairly quickly in 2003 following .the creation of the Caribbean Association of National Olympic Committees (CANOC). While the initial aim was to bring together only English-speaking nations, it was expanded to include the Netherlands Islands as well as the Dominican Republic, Puerto Rico, Haiti, and Cuba. From the outset, the number of sports was to be limited, with a range set between five and seven. The Trinidad and Tobago Olympic Committee (TTOC) hoped to secure an option to host the first edition in 2009, and Cuba possibly the second. However, the cost proved to be an obstacle to the realization of the games. At the 16th CANOC General Assembly, held on October 30 2016, at the Karibea Hotel Resort in Gosier, the nations considered hosting the first games.

In January 2020, the first Caribbean Games were finally awarded to Guadeloupe for organization at the end of juin 2021 · Despite the postponement of the 2020 Summer Olympics from 2020 to 2021, the committee decided to go ahead with the 2021 edition. In light of the economic crisis caused by the COVID-19 pandemic, costs were reduced from €2.5 million to €1.5 million, by eliminating the opening and closing ceremonies. The event, originally scheduled for June 30 to July 4, 2021, was ultimately postponed to 2022.

== Editions ==
Year	Edition	Host city	Host nation (as recognized by the IOC)	Dates	Nations	Events	Sports	Competitors	Top placed team
2022	1	Les Abymes	Guadeloupe	29 June – 3 July	29		7	800	Cuba
2027	2	Oranjestad	Aruba	5–17 September	TBA	TBA	TBA	TBA	
2031	3	Roseau	Dominica	TBA					

== Sports ==
- Archery ()
- Athletics ()
- Badminton ()
- Basketball ()
- Basketball 3x3 ()
- Beach soccer ()
- Beach volleyball ()
- Cricket ()
- Cycling ()
- Diving ()
- Fencing ()
- Football ()
- Futsal ()
- Golf ()
- Gymnastics ()
- Handball ()
- Judo ()
- Sailing ()
- Swimming ()
- Table tennis ()
- Taekwondo ()
- Tennis ()
- Triathlon ()
- Volleyball ()
- Weightlifting ()
- Wrestling ()
- Netball ()

== Nations ==
Nation	2022
AIA	Anguilla at the 2022 Caribbean Games
ARU	Aruba at the 2022 Caribbean Games
ATG	Antigua and Barbuda at the 2022 Caribbean Games
BAH	Bahamas at the 2022 Caribbean Games
BAR	Barbados at the 2022 Caribbean Games
BER	Bermuda at the 2022 Caribbean Games
BIZ	Belize at the 2022 Caribbean Games
IVB	British Virgin Islands at the 2022 Caribbean Games
CAY	Cayman Islands at the 2022 Caribbean Games
CUB	Cuba at the 2022 Caribbean Games
CUR	Curacao at the 2022 Caribbean Games
DMA	Dominica at the 2022 Caribbean Games
DOM	Dominican Republic at the 2022 Caribbean Games
GLP	Guadeloupe at the 2022 Caribbean Games
GRN	Grenada at the 2022 Caribbean Games
GUF	French Guiana at the 2022 Caribbean Games
GUY	Guyana at the 2022 Caribbean Games
HAI	Haiti at the 2022 Caribbean Games
ISV	U.S. Virgin Islands at the 2022 Caribbean Games
JAM	Jamaica at the 2022 Caribbean Games
LCA	Saint Lucia at the 2022 Caribbean Games
MNT	Montserrat at the 2022 Caribbean Games
MTQ	Martinique at the 2022 Caribbean Games
PUR	Puerto Rico at the 2022 Caribbean Games
SKN	Saint Kitts and Nevis at the 2022 Caribbean Games
SUR	Suriname at the 2022 Caribbean Games
SXM	Did not participate
TRI	Trinidad and Tobago at the 2022 Caribbean Games
TCA	Turks and Caicos at the 2022 Caribbean Games
VIN	Saint Vincent and the Grenadines at the 2022 Caribbean Games

== See also ==
- Pan American Games
- Commonwealth Games
- Central American and Caribbean Games
