= 2022 FIL Junior European Luge Championships =

- Location: Bludenz, Austria
- Dates: 15–16 January

The 43rd FIL Junior European Luge Championships took place under the auspices of the International Luge Federation in Bludenz, Austria from 15 to 16 January 2022.

== Medalists ==
Event	Gold		Silver		Bronze	
Junior men's singles	Marián Skupek; Slovakia	1:02.587	Fabio Zauser; Austria	1:02.723	Eduard Aleksandrov; Russia	1:02.788
Junior women's singles	Melina Fischer; Germany	1:03.307	Jessica Degenhardt; Germany	1:03.340	Zane Kaluma; Latvia	1:03.465
Junior men's doubles	Germany; Moritz Jäger; Valentin Steudte	1:05.357	Russia; Mikhail Karnaukhov; Iurii Chirva	1:05.601	Latvia; Kaspars Rinks; Vitālijs Jegorovs	1:05.844
Junior women's doubles	Latvia; Viktorija Ziediņa; Selīna Elizabete Zvilna	1:07.272	Germany; Luisa Romanenko; Pauline Patz	1:07.410	Russia; Anastasiia Kropacheva; Alena Starkova	1:07.789
Team relay	Germany; Melina Fischer; Timon Grancagnolo; Moritz Jäger / Valentin Steudte	1:36.056	Latvia; Zane Kaluma; Roberts Dreimanis; Kaspars Rinks / Vitālijs Jegorovs	1:36.750	Russia; Daria Olesik; Eduard Aleksandrov; Lev Romanov / Vladislav Veremeenko	1:37.023

== Medal table ==
* Host nation (Austria)

Rank	Nation	Gold	Silver	Bronze	Total
1	Germany	3	2	0	5
2	Latvia	1	1	2	4
3	Slovakia	1	0	0	1
4	Russia	0	1	3	4
5	Austria*	0	1	0	1
Totals (5 entries)		5	5	5	15
