= 2022 Pan American Acrobatic Gymnastics Championships =

International sports competition

The 4th Pan American Acrobatic Gymnastics Championships was held in Bogotá, Colombia from November 18 to 20, 2022. The competition was organized by the Colombian Gymnastics Federation and approved by the International Gymnastics Federation.

== Participating nations ==
- Brazil (Senior and age groups)
- Canada (Age groups)
- Colombia (Senior)
- Mexico (Age groups)
- Puerto Rico (Age groups)
- United States (Senior, junior and age groups)
- Venezuela (Age groups)

== Results ==
=== Senior ===
Event	Gold	Silver	Bronze
Women's Pair Balance	United States	Brazil	—
Women's Pair Dynamic	United States	Brazil	—
Women's Pair All-Around	United States	Brazil	—
Women's Group All-Around	Brazil	—	—
Men's Pair Balance	United States	Colombia	—
Men's Pair Dynamic	United States	—	—
Men's Pair All-Around	United States	—	—
Men's Group All-Around	Colombia	—	—

=== Junior and age groups ===
Event	Gold	Silver	Bronze
AG1 Men's Pair All-Around	Canada	—	—
AG1 Women's Pair All-Around	United States	Canada	Brazil
AG1 Women's Group All-Around	United States	Canada	Brazil
AG1 Team	Canada	Brazil	Mexico
AG2 Men's Pair All-Around	United States	—	—
AG2 Mixed Pair All-Around	Puerto Rico	—	—
AG2 Women's Pair Balance	Canada	Puerto Rico	United States
AG2 Women's Pair Dynamic	Canada	United States	Puerto Rico
AG2 Women's Pair All-Around	Canada	United States	Puerto Rico
AG2 Women's Group Balance	United States	Canada	Canada
AG2 Women's Group Dynamic	Canada	Canada	United States
AG2 Women's Group All-Around	Canada	Canada	United States
AG2 Team	Canada	United States	—
Junior Women's Pair All-Around	United States	—	—

== Medal table ==
Rank	Nation	Gold	Silver	Bronze	Total
1	United States	11	3	3	17
2	Canada	8	5	1	14
3	Brazil	1	4	2	7
4	Puerto Rico	1	1	2	4
5	Colombia	1	1	0	2
6	Mexico	0	0	1	1
Totals (6 entries)		22	14	9	45
