= 2022 Caribbean Games =

International multi-sport event

- Official logo of the Games
- Host city: Les Abymes
- Country: Guadeloupe
- Nations: 29
- Athletes: 800
- Events: 7 sports
- Opening: 29 June
- Closing: 3 July
- Main venue: Stade René Serge Nabajoth
- Website: cg2022.com

2022 Caribbean Games was an inaugural edition of the multi-sport event which was held between 29 June and 3 July 2022 in various towns of Guadeloupe, France. The competition was opened to athletes under the age of 23. There were 7 sports in total with around 800 athletes participating.

== Sports ==
- Athletics ()
- Basketball 3x3 ()
- Cycling ()
- Futsal (details)
- Judo (details)
- Swimming (details)
- Netball (details)

== Venues ==
- Opening ceremony and closing ceremony – Stade René Serge Nabajoth, Les Abymes
- Athletics – Stade Roger Zami, Le Gosier
- Basketball 3x3 – Gymnase de Boisripeaux, Les Abymes
- Cycling – Sainte Anne – Saint-François
- Futsal – Palais des sports, Le Gosier
- Judo – Hall Paul Chonchon, Pointe-à-Pitre
- Swimming – Piscine Intercommunale, Les Abymes & Anse Tabarin, Le Gosier
- Netball – Salle Laura Flessel, Petit-Bourg

== Medal table ==
* Host nation (Guadeloupe)

2022 Caribbean Games medal table
Rank	Nation	Gold	Silver	Bronze	Total
1	Cuba	21	15	16	52
2	Puerto Rico	12	11	12	35
3	Trinidad and Tobago	5	7	5	17
4	Dominican Republic	5	5	8	18
5	Jamaica	4	3	1	8
6	Martinique (MTQ)	4	2	2	8
7	Saint Lucia	3	0	2	5
8	Antigua and Barbuda	3	0	1	4
8	U.S. Virgin Islands	3	0	1	4
10	Cayman Islands	2	2	0	4
11	Aruba	2	1	1	4
12	Guadeloupe (GLP)*	1	7	8	16
13	Barbados	0	5	1	6
14	Bahamas	0	3	0	3
15	Guyana	0	1	4	5
16	British Virgin Islands	0	1	1	2
17	Haiti	0	1	0	1
17	Suriname	0	1	0	1
19	Grenada	0	0	3	3
20	Curaçao	0	0	2	2
21	Bermuda	0	0	1	1
21	French Guiana (GUF)	0	0	1	1
21	Saint Vincent and the Grenadines	0	0	1	1
24	Anguilla	0	0	0	0
24	Belize	0	0	0	0
24	Dominica	0	0	0	0
24	Montserrat	0	0	0	0
24	Saint Kitts and Nevis	0	0	0	0
24	Sint Maarten	0	0	0	0
24	Turks and Caicos Islands	0	0	0	0
Totals (30 entries)		65	65	71	201
