= 2022 ISA World Junior Surfing Championship =

- Venue: La Bocana and El Sunzal
- Location: Surf City, El Salvador
- Date: 27 May – 5 June 2022
- Nations: 45

The 2022 ISA World Junior Surfing Championship took place across the La Bocana and El Sunzal waves at Surf City in El Salvador, from 27 May to 5 June 2022. It was the 18th edition of the event and was organized by the International Surfing Association (ISA).

== Medal summary ==
=== Medallists ===
==== Under 18 ====
Event	Gold	Silver	Bronze
Boys	Luke Swanson; Hawaii	Shion Crawford; Hawaii	Luke Thompson; South Africa
Girls	Eweleiula Wong; Hawaii	Lucía Machado; Spain	Hina-Maria Conradi; France

==== Under 16 ====
Event	Gold	Silver	Bronze
Boys	Willis Droomer; Australia	Iñigo Madina; France	Luke Tema; Hawaii
Girls	Erin Brooks; Canada	Bella Kenworthy; United States	Mirai Ikeda; Japan

=== Medal table ===
* Host nation (El Salvador)

Rank	Nation	Gold	Silver	Bronze	Total
1	Hawaii (HAW)	2	1	1	4
2	Australia (AUS)	1	0	0	1
2	Canada (CAN)	1	0	0	1
4	France (FRA)	0	1	1	2
5	Spain (ESP)	0	1	0	1
5	United States (USA)	0	1	0	1
7	Japan (JPN)	0	0	1	1
7	South Africa (RSA)	0	0	1	1
Totals (8 entries)		4	4	4	12
