= List of world sports championships =

Major international sports competitions

The following is a list of world sports championships, including some sporting events which use a different name with a similar meaning. In some sports, there is a world series, but that term usually has a somewhat different meaning.

== Open gender world championship titles ==
Sport	Competition name	Competing entities	First held	Current holder	Next	Frequency	Details & notes
Auto racing
Auto racing	Formula One World Championship	Drivers	1950	(United Kingdom) Lando Norris (2025)	2026	Annual	Most wins: (Germany) Michael Schumacher and (United Kingdom) Lewis Hamilton 7, (Argentina) Juan Manuel Fangio 5
Auto racing	Formula One World Championship	Constructors	1958	(United Kingdom) McLaren-Mercedes (2025)	2026	Annual	Most wins: (Italy) Ferrari 16, (United Kingdom) McLaren 10, (United Kingdom) Williams 8
Auto racing	Formula E World Championship	Drivers	2014–15	(Germany) Pascal Wehrlein (2025–26)	2026–27	Annual	
Auto racing	Formula E World Championship	Manufacturers	2014–15	(Germany) Porsche (2025–26)	2026–27	Annual	
Auto racing	World Rally Championship	Drivers	1977	(France) Sébastien Ogier (2025)	2026	Annual	Most wins: (France) Sébastien Loeb and (France) Sébastien Ogier 9, (Finland) Juha Kankkunen and (Finland) Tommi Mäkinen 4
Auto racing	World Rally Championship	Manufacturers	1973	(Japan) Toyota Gazoo Racing WRT (2025)	2026	Annual	Most wins: (France) Sébastien Loeb and (France) Sébastien Ogier 9, (Finland) Juha Kankkunen and (Finland) Tommi Mäkinen 4
Auto racing	TCR World Tour	Drivers	2023	(France) Yann Ehrlacher (2025)	2026	Annual	
Auto racing	TCR World Tour	Manufacturers	2023	(Sweden) Lynk & Co Cyan Racing (2025)	2026	Annual	
Auto racing	Grand Touring World Challenge	Drivers	2014	(South Africa) Kelvin van der Linde & (Belgium) Charles Weerts (2025)	2026	Annual	
Auto racing	Grand Touring World Challenge	Manufacturers	2014	(Belgium) Team WRT (2025)	2026	Annual	
Auto racing	FIA World Endurance Championship	Drivers	2012	(United Kingdom) James Calado (Italy) Antonio Giovinazzi (Italy) Alessandro Pier Guidi (2025)	2026	Annual	
Auto racing	FIA World Endurance Championship	Manufacturers	2012	(Italy) Ferrari (2025)	2026	Annual	
Auto racing	World Rally-Raid Championship	Drivers	2023	(Brazil) Lucas Moraes & (France) Édouard Boulanger (2025)	2026	Annual	Co-sanctioned with FIM; replaced World Cup for Cross-Country Rallies
Auto racing	World Rallycross Championship	Drivers	2014	(Sweden) Johan Kristoffersson (2025)	2026	Annual	
Auto racing	Extreme H World Cup	Drivers	2025	(Sweden) Kevin Hansen & (Australia) Molly Taylor (2025)	2026	Annual	
Auto racing	Extreme H World Cup	Teams	2025	(Saudi Arabia) Jameel Motorsport (2025)	2026	Annual	
Auto racing	FIA World Baja Cup	Drivers	2002	(Argentina) Juan Cruz Yacopini & (Spain) Daniel Oliveras (2025)	2026	Annual	Baja events split off from cross-country rally competition after original bajas competition was combined with rallies world cup in 2012
Auto racing	Karting World Championship	OK	1964	(Belgium) Thibaut Ramaekers (2025)	2026	Annual	
Auto racing	Karting World Championship	KZ	1964	(Netherlands) Senna van Walstijn (2025)	2026	Annual	
Auto racing	FIA International Hill Climb Cup	Closed cars	2000	(Poland) Janusz Grzyb (2024)	2025	Annual	
Auto racing	FIA International Hill Climb Cup	Competition Cars	2000	(France) Sébastien Petit (2024)	2025	Annual	
Motorcycling	MotoGP World Championship	Riders	1949	(Spain) Marc Márquez (2025)	2026	Annual	Until 2002 as 500cc
Motorcycling	MotoGP World Championship	Constructors	1949	(Italy) Ducati (2025)	2026	Annual	Until 2002 as 500cc
Motorcycling	MotoGP World Championship	Teams	2002	(Italy) Ducati Lenovo Team (2025)	2026	Annual	Until 2002 as 500cc
Motorcycling	MotoE World Championship	Riders	2019	(Italy) Alessandro Zaccone (2025)	N/A	Annual	
Motorcycling	MotoE World Championship	Teams	2019	(Monaco) LCR E-Team (2025)	N/A	Annual	
Motorcycling	Superbike World Championship	Riders	1988	(Turkey) Toprak Razgatlıoğlu (2025)	2026	Annual	
Motorcycling	Superbike World Championship	Manufacturers	1988	(Italy) Ducati (2025)	2026	Annual	
Motorcycling	Supersport World Championship	Riders	1999	(Italy) Stefano Manzi (2025)	2026	Annual	
Motorcycling	Supersport World Championship	Manufacturers	1999	(Japan) Yamaha (2025)	2026	Annual	
Motorcycling	Motocross World Championship	Riders	2003	(France) Romain Febvre (2025)	2026	Annual	
Motorcycling	Motocross World Championship	Manufacturers	2003	(Austria) KTM (2025)	2026	Annual	
Motorcycling	Enduro World Championship	Riders (EnduroGP)	2004	(Spain) Josep García (2025)	2026	Annual	
Motorcycling	World Rally-Raid Championship	Riders	2022	(Australia) Daniel Sanders (2025)	2026	Annual	Co-sanctioned with FIA; replaced Cross-Country Rallies World Championship
Motorcycling	FIM Bajas World Cup	Riders	2012	(United Arab Emirates) Mohammed Al-Balooshi (2025)	2026	Annual	
Motorcycling	Speedway Grand Prix (since 1995)	Riders	1936	(Poland) Bartosz Zmarzlik (2025)	2026	Annual	
Motorcycling	Speedway of Nations (since 2018)	Nations	1960	Australia (2025)	2026	Annual	
Motorcycling	Individual Ice Speedway World Championship	Riders	1966	(Sweden) Martin Haarahiltunen (2025)	2026	Annual	
Motorcycling	FIM Trial World Championship	Outdoor	1964	(Spain) Toni Bou (2025)	2026	Annual	
Motorcycling	FIM Trial World Championship	X-Trial	1993	(Spain) Toni Bou (2025)	2026	Annual	
Motorcycling	FIM Hard Enduro World Championship	Riders	2018	(Germany) Manuel Lettenbichler (2025)	2026	Annual	
Motorcycling	FIM SuperEnduro World Championship	Riders	2007–08	(United Kingdom) Billy Bolt (2024–25)	2025–26	Annual	
Motorcycling	Sidecar World Championship	Pairs	1949	(United Kingdom) Harry Payne (driver) & (France) Kevin Rousseau (passenger) (2024)	2025	Annual	
Motorcycling	Sidecarcross World Championship	Pairs	1980	(Netherlands) Koen Hermans (driver) & Ben van den Bogaart (passenger) (2025)	2026	Annual	
Aquabike	Aquabike World Championship	Individuals	1996	(Sweden) Samuel Johansson (Runabout GP1), 2024 (United Arab Emirates) Rashid Al Mulla (Freestyle), 2024 (Belgium) Quinten Bossche (Ski Division GP1 Man), 2024 (Estonia) Jasmiin Üpraus (Ski Division Woman), 2024	2025	Annual	2020 Season was made of only one GP as all the remaining GP were cancelled due to COVID-19 pandemic
Drone racing	MultiGP	Individuals	2015	(Poland) Pawel Laszczak (2024)	2025	Annual	
Gliding	World Gliding Championships	Individuals	1937	(Poland) Łukasz Grabowski - SZD 56-2 Diana 2 (2025)	2026	Annual	The duration between World Gliding Championships varies slightly, dependent on the hemisphere of the next planned edition
Gliding	World Gliding Championships	Individuals	1937	(Belgium) Jeroen Jennen - LS8 (2025)	2026	Annual	The duration between World Gliding Championships varies slightly, dependent on the hemisphere of the next planned edition
Gliding	World Gliding Championships	Individuals	1937	(Germany) Stefan Langer - LS3 (2025)	2026	Annual	The duration between World Gliding Championships varies slightly, dependent on the hemisphere of the next planned edition
Motorboat racing	Formula 1 Powerboat World Championship	Individuals	1981	(Sweden) Jonas Andersson (2024)	2025	Annual	2020 Season got cancelled due to COVID-19 pandemic
Motorboat racing	Formula 4S Powerboat World Championship	Individuals	2008	(Latvia) Nils Slakteris (2025)	2026	Annual	
Motorboat racing	Class 1 World Powerboat Championship	Pairs	1964	(United States) Tyler Miller & Myrick Coil (2024)	2025	Annual	
Motorboat racing	E1 Series	Drivers	2024	(United Kingdom) Sam Coleman & (Finland) Emma Kimiläinen (2025)	2026	Annual	
Motorboat racing	E1 Series	Teams	2024	(United States) Team Brady (2025)	2026	Annual	
Paragliding	Paragliding World Cup	Individuals	1992	(France) Maxime Pinot & (France) Constance Mettetal (2024)	2025	Annual	
Practical shooting	IPSC Handgun World Shoots	Individuals	1975	Production Optics: (France) Eric Grauffel / (United States) Justine Williams; Standard: (Philippines) Rolly Tecson / (France) Margaux Nycz; Classic: (Slovenia) Robert Černigoj / (United States) Jalise Williams; Production: (United States) Mason Lane / (Italy) Camilla Almici; Open: (United States) Christian Sailer / (Italy) Denny Rossetto; Revolver: (United States) Michael Poggie (2025)	2028	Triennial	Winner(s) of largest division(s)
Shooting	ICFRA Individual Long Range World Championships	Individuals	1992	(Australia) Ash Bidgood (2024)	2028	Quadrennial	Most wins: (United Kingdom) Anthony Ringer 2
Shooting	ICFRA Palma match	Teams	1876	Australia (2024)	2028	Quadrennial	Most wins: United States 14

== Male world championship titles ==
Sport	Competition name	Competing entities	Number of participants	First held	Current holder	Next	Frequency	Details & notes
Alpine skiing	FIS Alpine World Ski Championships	Individuals & Nations		1931	Winners in 5 events (2025)	2027	Biennial	
Alpine skiing	FIS Alpine Ski World Cup	Individuals		1967	(Switzerland) Marco Odermatt (2024–25)	2025–26	Annual	
Alpine skiing	FIS Alpine Ski World Cup	Nations		1967	Switzerland (2024–25)	2025–26	Annual	
American football	IFAF World Championship	Nations	7	1999	United States (2015)	TBD	Quadrennial	Not held in 2019, 2025
Armwrestling	World Armwrestling Championship	Individuals		1979	Winners in 22 events (2025)	2026	Annual	Cancelled in 2020 due to the COVID-19 pandemic
Aquatics	Swimming at the World Aquatics Championships	Individuals^{[R]}		1973	Winners in 20 events (2025)	2027	Biennial	
Aquatics	Diving at the World Aquatics Championships	Individuals		1973	Winners in 5 events (2025)	2027	Biennial	
Aquatics	Synchronised swimming at the World Aquatics Championships	Individuals		2023	Winners in 2 events (2025)	2027	Biennial	
Aquatics	Open water swimming at the World Aquatics Championships	Individuals		1991	Winners in 3 events (2025)	2027	Biennial	
Aquatics	High diving at the World Aquatics Championships	Individuals		2013	(United States) James Lichtenstein (2025)	2027	Biennial	
Aquatics	World Aquatics Swimming Championships (25m)	Individuals^{[R]}		1993	Winners in 21 events (2024)	2026	Biennial	
Aquatics	World Aquatics Swimming World Cup	Individuals		1988–89	(Hungary) Hubert Kós (2025)	2026	Annual	
Aquatics	World Aquatics Diving World Cup	Individuals		1979	Winners in 4 events (2024)	2026	Biennial	
Aquatics	FINA Marathon Swim World Series	Individuals		2007	(Hungary) Dávid Betlehem (2026)	2027	Annual	
Aquatics	Red Bull Cliff Diving World Series	Individuals		2009	(France) Gary Hunt (2025)	2026	Annual	
Archery	World Archery Championships	Individuals & Nations		1931	Winners in 4 events (2025)	2027	Biennial	
Archery	Archery World Cup	Individual recurve		2006	(United States) Brady Ellison (2025)	2026	Annual	
Archery	Archery World Cup	Individual compound		2006	(Turkey) Emircan Haney (2025)	2026	Annual	
Archery	World Field Archery Championships	Individuals & Nations		1969	Winners in 4 events (2024)	2026	Biennial	
Athletics	World Athletics Championships	Individuals^{[R]}		1983	Winners in 24 events (2025)	2027	Biennial	1983–1991 held quadrennially, biennially starting 1993
Athletics	World Athletics Indoor Championships	Individuals^{[R]}		1985	Winners in 13 events (2025)	2026	Biennial	
Athletics	World Athletics Ultimate Championship	Individuals^{[R]}		2026		2026	Biennial	
Athletics	World Athletics Relays	4×100 m men's relay		2014	United States (2026)	2028	Biennial	
Athletics	World Athletics Relays	4×400 m men's relay		2014	Botswana (2026)	2028	Biennial	
Athletics	World Athletics Cross Country Championships	Individuals		1973	(Uganda) Jacob Kiplimo (2026)	2028	Biennial	
Athletics	World Athletics Cross Country Championships	Nations		1973	Ethiopia (2026)	2028	Biennial	
Athletics	World Athletics Road Running Championships	Individuals		1992	(Kenya) Sabastian Sawe (2023)	2026	Biennial	Annually until 2010
Athletics	World Athletics Road Running Championships	Team		1992	Kenya (2023)	2026	Biennial	Annually until 2010
Athletics	World Mountain and Trail Running Championships	Individuals		1985; 2007	Winners in 10 events (2025)	2026	Biennial	
Athletics	World Athletics Race Walking Team Championships	Individuals & Nations		1961	Winners in 4 events (2024)	2026	Biennial	
Athletics	IAU 50 km World Championships	Individuals		2005	(Spain) Chakib Lachgar (2023)	2025	Biennial	2017, 2018 not held
Athletics	IAU 100 km World Championships	Individuals		1987	(Japan) Jumpei Yamaguchi (2024)	2026	Biennial	
Athletics	IAU 24 Hour World Championship	Individuals		2001	(Ukraine) Andrii Tkachuk (2025)	2027	Biennial	
Athletics	IAU 24 Hour World Championship	Nations		2003	Finland (2025)	2027	Biennial	
Badminton	BWF World Championships	Singles		1977	(China) Shi Yuqi (2025)	2026	Annual	Annually since 2006; Not held in Summer Olympic years
Badminton	BWF World Championships	Doubles		1977	(South Korea) Kim Won-ho & Seo Seung-jae (2025)	2026	Annual	Annually since 2006; Not held in Summer Olympic years
Badminton	Thomas Cup	Nations		1949	China (2024)	2026	Biennial	Since 1984, it has been held concurrently with the women's Uber Cup. Most wins: Indonesia 14, China 11, Malaysia 5
Ball Hockey	Ball Hockey World Championship	Nations	12	1996	Canada (2024)	2026	Biennial	
Bandy	Bandy World Championship	Nations	6	1957	Sweden (2026)	2027	Annual	The second Bandy WCs were held in 1961; from that point, the championships were held biennially until 2003; and annually ever since
Baseball	World Baseball Classic	Nations	20	2006	Venezuela (2026)	TBD	Triennial	Started in 1938 (as IBAF Baseball World Cup). Restarted in 2006; the first two of these modern WBCs (MLB approved and sanctioned by WBSC) were separated by three years (2006, 2009). Moved to quadrennially until 2017. 2021 postponed to 2023 due to the COVID-19 pandemic. Most wins: Japan 3, Dominican Republic, United States and Venezuela 1
Baseball	WBSC Premier12	Nations	16	2015	Chinese Taipei (2024)	2027	Triennial	
Basketball	FIBA Basketball World Cup	Nations	32	1950	Germany (2023)	2027	Quadrennial	After 2019, the FIBA Basketball World Cup (but not the FIBA Women's Basketball World Cup) was reset on a new quadrennial cycle. The 2014 (men's) World Cup was followed by the 2019 World Cup, avoiding conflict with the FIFA World Cup. Most wins: United States 5, Yugoslavia 5, Soviet Union 3
Basketball	FIBA 3x3 World Cup	Nations		2012	Latvia (2026)	2027	Annual	Biennial until 2016
Basketball	FIBA Intercontinental Cup	Clubs	6	1966	(United States) NBA G League United (2026)	2027	Annual	
Basque pelota	Basque Pelota World Championships	Individuals & Pairs		1952	Winners in 13 events (2022)	2026	Quadrennial	
Beach handball	World Men's Beach Handball Championship	Nations	16	2004	Germany (2026)	2028	Biennial	
Beach soccer	FIFA Beach Soccer World Cup	Nations	16	2005	Brazil (2025)	2027	Biennial	Most wins: Brazil 7, Russia 3, Portugal 2
Beach tennis	Beach Tennis World Championship	Individuals		2009	(France) Nicolas Gianotti & (Italy) Mattia Spoto (2025)	2026	Annual	
Beach volleyball	FIVB Beach Volleyball World Championships	Nations		1997	(Czech Republic) Perušič – Schweiner (2023)	2025	Biennial	
Beach wrestling	World Beach Wrestling Championships	Individuals		2006	Winners in 4 weight classes (2024)	2025	Annual	
Biathlon	Biathlon World Championships	Individuals & Nations		1958	Winners in 5 events (2025)	2027	Annual	Not held in Winter Olympic years
Biathlon	Summer Biathlon World Championships	Individuals		1996	Winners in 3 events (2024)	2026	Biennial	Cancelled in 2020, 2025
Biathlon	Biathlon World Cup	Individuals		1977–78	(Norway) Sturla Holm Lægreid (2024–25)	2025–26	Annual	
Biathlon	Biathlon World Cup	Nations		2000–01	France (2024–25)	2025–26	Annual	
Billiards & Pool	World Billiards Championship (English billiards)	Individuals		1870	(England) David Causier (2025)	2026	Annual	
Billiards & Pool	WPA World Nine-ball Championship	Individuals		1990	(Philippines) Carlo Biado (2025)	2026	Annual	
Bobsleigh	IBSF World Championships	Four man		1930	(Germany) Francesco Friedrich; Matthias Sommer; Alexander Schüller; Felix Straub (2025)	2027	Annual	Not held in Winter Olympic years
Bobsleigh	IBSF World Championships	Two man		1931	(Germany) Francesco Friedrich & Alexander Schüller (2025)	2027	Annual	Not held in Winter Olympic years
Bobsleigh	Bobsleigh World Cup	Individuals		1984–85	(Germany) Francesco Friedrich (2024–25)	2025–26	Annual	
Bodybuilding	Mr. Olympia	Open		1965	(United States) Nick Walker (2026)	2027	Annual	
Bodybuilding	Mr. Olympia	Classic Physique		2016	(United Kingdom) Niall Darwen (2026)	2027	Annual	
Bodybuilding	Mr. Olympia	212 lbs		2008	(United States) Keone Pearson (2026)	2027	Annual	
Bodybuilding	Mr. Olympia	Men's Physique		2013	(United Kingdom) Ryan Terry (2026)	2027	Annual	
Bowling (ten-pin)	PBA World Championship	Individuals		1960	(United States) E. J. Tackett (2025)	2026	Annual	
Bowling (ten-pin)	QubicaAMF Bowling World Cup	Individuals		1965	(China) Du Jianchao (2025)	2026	Annual	
Bowls	World Bowls Championship	Individuals & Nations		1966	Winners in 5 events (2023)	2027	Biennial	
Bowls	World Indoor Bowls Championships	Singles		1979	(Scotland) Jason Banks (2025)	2026	Annual	
Bowls	World Indoor Bowls Championships	Pairs		1979	(Scotland) Jason Banks & Michael Stepney (2025)	2026	Annual	
Boxing	IBA Men's World Boxing Championships	Individuals		1974	Winners in 10 weight classes (2025)	2027	Biennial	
Breakdancing	Battle of the Year	Teams		2009	(Netherlands) The Ruggeds (2025)	2026	Annual	
Breakdancing	Battle of the Year	Individuals		2009	(Canada) Phil Wizard (2025)	2026	Annual	
Breakdancing	Red Bull BC One	Individuals		2004	(Netherlands) Menno (2024)	2025	Annual	
Canoeing	ICF Canoe Sprint World Championships	Individuals		1938	Winners in 12 events (2025)	2026	Annual	
Canoeing	ICF Canoe Slalom World Championships	Individuals & Nations		1949	Winners in 6 events (2025)	2026	Annual	Not held in Summer Olympic years
Canoeing	Canoe Slalom World Cup	Individuals		1988	Winners in 4 disciplines (2025)	2026	Annual	
Canoeing	ICF Canoe Marathon World Championships	Individuals		1988	Winners in 6 events (2025)	2026	Annual	
Canoeing	Wildwater Canoeing World Championships	Individuals		1959	Winners in 3 events (2025)	2026	Annual	
Canoe polo	ICF Canoe Polo World Championships	Nations		1994	Germany (2024)	2026	Biennial	
Catch wrestling	Snake Pit World Championships	Individuals		2018	Winners in 8 weight classes (2024)	2025	Annual	Not held in 2020 or 2021 due to the COVID-19 pandemic
Climbing	IFSC Climbing World Championships	Individuals		1991	Winners in 3 events (2025)	2027	Biennial	
Climbing	IFSC Climbing World Cup	Individuals & Nations		1989	Winners in 3 disciplines (2025)	2026	Annual	
Cricket	ICC Cricket World Cup (ODI format)	Nations	14	1975	Australia (2023)	2027	Quadrennial	Most wins: Australia 6, West Indies 2, India 2, Pakistan, Sri Lanka, England 1 each
Cricket	ICC Men's T20 World Cup (T20I format)	Nations	20	2007	India (2026)	2028	Biennial	Biennial until 2016. Changed from odd-numbered years (2007–2009) to even-numbered years (2010–2016). Quadrennial 2016–2020. Biennial since 2022. Most wins: India 3, England 2, West Indies 2, multiple countries 1
Cricket	ICC World Test Championship (Test format)	Nations	9	2019–21	South Africa (2023–25)	2025–27	Biennial (Note: only for final match)	2 year league format concluding with the final
Cricket	ICC Champions Trophy	Nations	8	1998	India (2025)	2029	Quadrennial	Biennial until 2017. Quadrennial since 2025
Cross-country skiing	FIS Nordic World Ski Championships	Individuals & Nations		1925	Winners in 6 events (2025)	2027	Biennial	Not held in Winter Olympic years
Cross-country skiing	FIS Cross-Country World Cup	Individuals		1973–74	(Norway) Johannes Høsflot Klæbo (2024–25)	2025–26	Annual	
CrossFit	CrossFit Games	Individuals		2007	(United States) James Sprague (2026)	2027	Annual	
Curling	World Curling Championships	Nations		1959	Sweden (2026)	2027	Annual	2020 cancellation, Most wins: Canada 36, Sweden 13, Scotland 7
Cycling	UCI Road World Championships	Road race		1927	(Slovenia) Tadej Pogačar (2025)	2026	Annual	
Cycling	UCI Road World Championships	Time trial		1994	(Belgium) Remco Evenepoel (2025)	2026	Annual	
Cycling	UCI Track Cycling World Championships	Individuals & Nations		1893	Winners in 11 events (2025)	2026	Annual	
Cycling	UCI Mountain Bike World Championships	Individuals		1990	Winners in 8 events (2025)	2026	Annual	
Cycling	UCI BMX World Championships	Individuals		1982	(France) Arthur Pilard (2025)	2026	Annual	
Cycling	UCI Urban Cycling World Championships	Freestyle BMX		2017	Flatland: (France) Matthias Dandois (2024); Park: (Australia) Logan Martin (2024)	2025	Annual	
Cycling	UCI Urban Cycling World Championships	Trials		1986	Men Elite 20": (Spain) Alejandro Montalvo (2024); Men Elite 26": (United Kingdom) Jack Carthy (2024)	2025	Annual	
Cycling	UCI Cyclo-cross World Championships	Individuals		1950	(Netherlands) Mathieu van der Poel (2025)	2026	Annual	
Cycling	UCI Track Cycling Nations Cup	Individuals & Nations		2021	Winners in 7 events (2025)	2026	Annual	
Cycling	UCI Mountain Bike World Cup	Cross-country		1990	(United States) Christopher Blevins (2025)	2026	Annual	
Cycling	UCI Mountain Bike World Cup	Downhill		1993	(Canada) Jackson Goldstone (2025)	2026	Annual	
Cycling	UCI Cyclo-cross World Cup	Individuals		1993–94	(Belgium) Michael Vanthourenhout (2024–25)	2025–26	Annual	
Cycling	UCI BMX Racing World Cup	Individuals		2010	(France) Arthur Pilard (2025)	2026	Annual	
Darts	PDC World Darts Championship	Individuals		1994	(England) Luke Littler (2026)	2027	Annual	Most wins: (England) Phil Taylor 14, (Netherlands) Michael van Gerwen 3, (Scotland) Gary Anderson 2
Darts	PDC World Cup of Darts	Doubles		2010	Northern Ireland (2025)	2026	Annual	Most wins: England 5, Netherlands 4, Wales 2, Scotland 2
Disc golf	PDGA World Championships	Individuals		1982	(United States) Gannon Buhr (2025)	2026	Annual	
Dodgeball	Dodgeball World Championship	Nations - Foam		2012	United States (2024)	2026	Biennial	
Dodgeball	Dodgeball World Championship	Nations - Cloth		2019	Austria (2024)	2026	Biennial	
Fencing	World Fencing Championships	Individuals & Nations		1921	Winners in 6 events (2025)	2026	Annual	Championships are not held for Olympic events in Summer Olympic years
Fencing	Fencing World Cup	Foil; Sabre; Épée		1972	(Hong Kong) Cheung Ka Long (South Korea) Oh Sang-uk (Egypt) Mohamed El-Sayed (2024–25)	2025–26	Annual	
Field hockey	FIH Hockey World Cup	Nations	16	1971	Germany (2026)	2030	Quadrennial	Most wins: Germany 4, Pakistan 4, Netherlands 3, Australia 3
Field hockey	Men's FIH Indoor Hockey World Cup	Nations	12	2003	Germany (2025)	2027	Biennial	
Field hockey	FIH Men's Hockey5s World Cup	Nations	16	2024	Netherlands (2024)	2028	Quadrennial	
Figure skating	World Figure Skating Championships	Individuals		1896	(United States) Ilia Malinin (2025)	2026	Annual	
Figure skating	ISU Grand Prix of Figure Skating	Individuals		1995	(United States) Ilia Malinin (2024–25)	2025–26	Annual	
Finswimming	Finswimming World Championships	Individuals		1976	Winners in 17 events (2024)	2026	Biennial	
Fistball	Fistball World Championships	Nations		1968	Germany (2023)	2027	Quadrennial	
Flag football	IFAF Flag Football World Championship	Nations	16	2002	United States (2026)	2028	Biennial	
Floorball	Men's World Floorball Championship	Nations	16	1996	Finland (2024)	2026	Biennial	
Freediving	AIDA World Championship	Pool		2013	Winners in 4 disciplines (2025)	2026	Annual	
Freediving	AIDA World Championship	Depth		2013	Winners in 4 disciplines (2025)	2026	Annual	
Freerunning & Parkour	Parkour World Championships	Speed		2022	(Switzerland) Caryl Cordt-Moller (2024)	2026	Biennial	
Freerunning & Parkour	Parkour World Championships	Freestyle		2022	(Sweden) Elis Torhall (2024)	2026	Biennial	
Freestyle Football	WFFA World Championships	Individuals		2017	(2025)	2026	Annual	
Freestyle Skiing	FIS Freestyle World Ski Championships	Individuals		1986	Winners in 7 events (2025)	2027	Biennial	Not held in Winter Olympic years
Freestyle Skiing	FIS Freestyle Ski World Cup	Individuals		1980	Winners in 9 disciplines (2024–25)	2025–26	Annual	
Football	FIFA World Cup	Nations	48	1930	Spain (2026)	2030	Quadrennial	Most wins: Brazil 5, Germany 4, Italy 4
Football	FIFA Club World Cup	Clubs	32	2000	(England) Chelsea (2025)	2029	Quadrennial	Annual until 2023, Most wins: (Spain) Real Madrid 5, (Spain) Barcelona 3, (Germany) Bayern Munich 2, (England) Chelsea 2, (Brazil) Corinthians 2
Football	FIFA Intercontinental Cup	Clubs	6	2024	(France) Paris Saint-Germain (2025)	2026	Annual	
Futsal	FIFA Futsal World Cup	Nations	24	1989	Brazil (2024)	2028	Quadrennial	Most wins: Brazil 6, Spain 2, Argentina 1, Portugal 1
Futsal	AMF Futsal World Cup	Nations	16	1982	Paraguay (2023)	2027	Quadrennial	Originally a triennial event, held quadrennially after 2003
Golf	PGA Tour	Individuals		1930	(England) Tommy Fleetwood (2025)	2026	Annual	
Golf	PGA European Tour	Individuals		1972	(Northern Ireland) Rory McIlroy (2025)	2026	Annual	
Gymnastics	World Artistic Gymnastics Championships	Individuals & Nations		1903	Winners in 7 events (2025)	2026	Annual	Not held in Olympic Years
Gymnastics	Trampoline Gymnastics World Championships	Individuals & Nations		1964	Winners in 7 events (2023)	2025	Biennial	
Gymnastics	Acrobatic Gymnastics World Championships	Pair and Group		1974	Winners in 6 events (2024)	2026	Biennial	
Gymnastics	Aerobic Gymnastics World Championships	Individuals		1995	Winners in 8 events (2024)	2026	Biennial	
Gymnastics	Artistic Gymnastics World Cup	Individuals		1975	Winners in various events (2025)	2026	Annual	
Handball	IHF World Men's Handball Championship	Nations	32	1938	Denmark (2025)	2027	Biennial	Most wins: France 6, Sweden 4, Romania 4, Denmark 4
Handball	IHF Men's Super Globe	Clubs		1997	(Spain) FC Barcelona (2025)	2026	Annual	
Hyrox	Hyrox World Championships	Individuals		2018–19	(Germany) Tim Wenisch (2024–25)	2025–26	Annual	
Hyrox	Hyrox World Championships	Doubles		2018–19	(Germany) Tim Wenisch & Jannik Czapla (2024–25)	2025–26	Annual	
Ice climbing	UIAA Ice Climbing World Championships	Lead		2002	(South Korea) Lee Young-geon (2024)	2026	Biennial	
Ice climbing	UIAA Ice Climbing World Championships	Speed		2002	(Iran) Mohammad Reza Safdarian (2024)	2026	Biennial	
Ice hockey	IIHF World Championship	Nations	16	1920	Finland (2026)	2027	Annual	Not held from 1940 to 1946 during World War II. Cancelled in 2020 due to the COVID-19 pandemic. Most wins: Canada 28, Soviet Union & Russia 27, Czechoslovakia & Czech Republic 13, Sweden 11
Inline hockey	FIRS Inline Hockey World Championships	Nations		1995	United States (2024)	2026	Biennial	
Judo	World Judo Championships	Individuals		1956	Winners in 7 events (2025)	2026	Annual	
Ju-jitsu	Ju-Jitsu World Championships	Individuals		1994	Winners in 14 weight classes (2024)	2025	Annual	
Kabaddi	Kabaddi World Cup (World Kabaddi)	Nations	9	2019	India (2025)	TBD	TBD	
Karate	Karate World Championships	Individuals & Nations		1970	Winners in 8 events (2023)	2025	Biennial	
Kho Kho	Kho Kho World Cup	Nations	20	2025	India (2025)	2027	Biennial	
Kickboxing	WAKO Amateur World Championships	Individuals		1978	Winners in various weight classes (2023)	2025	Biennial	
Kurash	World Kurash Championships	Individuals		1999	Winners in 7 weight classes (2023)	2025	Biennial	
Lacrosse	World Lacrosse Men's Championship	Nations		1967	United States (2023)	2027	Quadrennial	
Lacrosse	World Lacrosse Box Championships	Nations	28	2003	Canada (2024)	2028	Quadrennial	
Luge	FIL World Luge Championships	Men's singles		1955	(Germany) Max Langenhan (2025)	2027	Annual	Not held in Winter Olympic years
Luge	FIL World Luge Championships	Men's doubles		1955	(Germany) Hannes Orlamünder & Paul Gubitz (2025)	2027	Annual	Not held in Winter Olympic years
Luge	Luge World Cup	Men's singles		1977–78	(Germany) Max Langenhan (2024–25)	2025–26	Annual	
Luge	Luge World Cup	Men's doubles		1977–78	(Germany) Tobias Wendl & Tobias Arlt (2024–25)	2025–26	Annual	
Luge	FIL World Luge Natural Track Championships	Men's singles		1979	(Austria) Michael Scheikl (2025)	2027	Biennial	
Luge	FIL World Luge Natural Track Championships	Men's doubles		1979	(Italy) Patrick Lambacher & Matthias Lambacher (2025)	2027	Biennial	
Minifootball	WMF World Cup	Nations	32	2015	Azerbaijan (2025)	2027	Biennial	
Modern pentathlon	World Modern Pentathlon Championships	Individual		1949	(Egypt) Moutaz Mohamed (2025)	2026	Annual	
Modern pentathlon	World Modern Pentathlon Championships	Team		1949	France (2025)	2026	Annual	
Modern pentathlon	Modern Pentathlon World Cup	Individuals		1999	(Egypt) Moutaz Mohamed (2025)	2026	Annual	
Nordic combined	FIS Nordic World Ski Championships	Individuals & Nations		1925	Winners in 3 events (2025)	2027	Biennial	
Nordic combined	FIS Nordic Combined World Cup	Individuals		1983–84	(Germany) Vinzenz Geiger (2024–25)	2025–26	Annual	
Orienteering	World Orienteering Championships	Individuals & Nations		1966	Winners in 3 events (2025)	2026	Annual	Originally biennially, annually since 2003
Orienteering	Orienteering World Cup	Individuals		1986	(Sweden) Max Peter Bejmer (2025)	2026	Annual	Unofficial title cups held in 1983 and 1984 (first official cup in 1986); held biennially until 2004, now annually
Padel tennis	Padel World Championship	Nations		1992	Argentina (2024)	2026	Biennial	
Pickleball	World Pickleball Championships	Nations		2019	(2025)	2027	Biennial	
Polo	World Polo Championship	Nations	8	1987	Spain (2022)	2026	Triennial	Most wins: Argentina 5, Brazil 3, Chile 2
Powerlifting	IPF Powerlifting World Championships	Individuals		2011	Winners in various weight classes (2025)	2026	Annual	
Racquetball	Racquetball World Championships	Nations		1981	United States (2024)	2026	Biennial	
Real tennis	Real Tennis World Championship	Singles		1740	(United States) Camden Riviere (2025)	2027	Biennial	
Real tennis	Real Tennis World Championship	Doubles		2001	(United States) Tim Chisholm & Camden Riviere (2024)	2026	Biennial	
Rogaining	World Rogaining Championships	Teams		1992	Maxim Tsvetkov & Semen Yakimov (2025)	2027	Biennial	
Roll ball	Roll Ball World Cup	Nations		2011	Kenya (2023)	2025	Biennial	
Roller derby	Men's Roller Derby World Cup	Nations		2014	United States (2018)	2026	Quadrennial	
Roller hockey	Men's Roller Hockey World Cup	Nations		1936	Spain (2024)	2026	Biennial	Current FIRS cups restarted in 1958
Roller hockey	Rink hockey World Club Championship	Clubs		2006	(Portugal) Sporting CP (2025)	2026	Annual	
Roller sports	Inline Speed Skating World Championships	Individuals		1937	Winners in 11 events (2025)	2026	Annual	
Roller sports	World Inline Cup	Individuals		2000	(France) Nolan Beddiaf (2025)	2026	Annual	
Roller sports	Artistic Skating World Championships	Individuals		1980	(Spain) Héctor Díez (2025)	2026	Annual	Not held in 2020
Roller sports	World Scootering Championship	Individuals		2019; 2021	Park: (United Kingdom) Jayden Sharman (2024); Street: (France) Lucas Di Meglio (2024)	2025	Annual	Not held in 2020
Rowing	World Rowing Championships	Nations		1962	Winners in 8 events (2025)	2026	Annual	Championships are not held for Olympic events in Summer Olympic years
Rowing	World Rowing Cup	Nations		1997	Winners in varying numbers of events per stage (2025)	2026	Annual	Three stages
Rowing	World Rowing Indoor Championships	Individuals & Teams		2018	Winners in 6 events (2025)	2026	Annual	
Rugby league	Rugby League World Cup	Nations		1954	Australia (2021)	2026	Quadrennial	Quadrennial after 2008, Most wins: Australia 12, Great Britain 3, New Zealand 1
Rugby league	World Club Challenge	Clubs	2	1976	(England) Wigan Warriors (2024)	2026	Annually	Annually since 2000, Adhoc prior to 2000, Not played in 2021 and 2022 due to COVID-19, and 2025. Most Wins: Wigan Warriors and Sydney Roosters (5 each)
Rugby union	Rugby World Cup	Nations	24	1987	South Africa (2023)	2027	Quadrennial	Most wins: South Africa 4, New Zealand 3, Australia 2, England 1
Rugby sevens	Rugby World Cup Sevens	Nations	24	1993	Fiji (2022)	2026	Quadrennial	A previous decision to scrap the Rugby World Cup Sevens was reversed in 2013. The next event after 2013 was in 2018, before resuming a four-yearly cycle.
Sailing	Sailing World Championships	Individuals & Pairs		2003	Winners in 4 classes (2023)	2027	Quadrennial	
Sambo	World Sambo Championships	Individuals		1973	Winners in various weight classes (2024)	2025	Annual	
Sepak takraw	ISTAF World Cup	Regu	12	2022	India (2025)	2027	Biennial	
Sepak takraw	ISTAF World Cup	Doubles	10	2024	Thailand (2025)	2027	Biennial	
Sepak takraw	ISTAF World Cup	Quadrant		2022	Thailand (2025)	2027	Biennial	
Shooting	ISSF World Shooting Championships	Individuals & Nations		1897	Winners in 28 events (2023)	2025	Biennial	
Shooting	ISSF World Shotgun Championships	Individuals & Nations		1934	Winners in 4 events (2022)	2026	Quadrennial	
Shooting	World Benchrest Championships	Individuals & Nations		1991	Winners in 7 events (2025)	2025	Biennial	
Shooting	World Running Target Championships	Individuals & Team		1961	Winners in 10 events (2022)	2026	Quadrennial	
Shooting	ISSF World Cup	Individuals		1986	China (2024)	2025	Annual	
Short-track	World Short Track Speed Skating Championships	Individuals & Nations		1976	Winners in 4 events (2025)	2026	Annual	Although the International Skating Union did not conduct an official World Short Track Championship until 1981, it began organising international events in 1976. All annual ISU-sanctioned international championships from 1976 to 1980 are now retrospectively recognised as World Championships
Short-track	ISU Short Track World Tour	Individuals & Nations		2024–25	Winners in 5 disciplines (2024–25)	2025–26	Annual	
Skateboarding	World Skateboarding Championship	Park		2016	(Brazil) Augusto Akio (2024)	2026	Annual	
Skateboarding	World Skateboarding Championship	Street		2010	(Japan) Toa Sasaki (2024)	2026	Annual	
Skeleton	IBSF World Championships	Individuals		1982	(United Kingdom) Matt Weston (2025)	2027	Annual	Not held in Winter Olympic years
Skeleton	Skeleton World Cup	Individuals		1986–87	(United Kingdom) Matt Weston (2024–25)	2025–26	Annual	
Ski jumping	FIS Nordic World Ski Championships	Individuals & Nations		1962	Winners in 3 events (2025)	2027	Biennial	Not held in Winter Olympic years
Ski jumping	FIS Ski Flying World Championships	Individuals		1972	(Austria) Stefan Kraft (2024)	2026	Biennial	
Ski jumping	FIS Ski Flying World Championships	National Team		2004	Slovenia (2024)	2026	Biennial	
Ski jumping	FIS Ski Jumping World Cup	Individuals		1979–80	(Austria) Daniel Tschofenig (2024–25)	2025–26	Annual	
Ski mountaineering	World Championships of Ski Mountaineering	Individuals		2002	Winners in 4 events (2025)	2027	Biennial	
Snooker	World Snooker Championship	Individuals		1927	(China) Wu Yize (2026)	2027	Annual	This championship is open to both sexes, but no woman has ever won the event. Most wins in modern era: (Scotland) Stephen Hendry 7, (England) Ronnie O'Sullivan 7, (England) Steve Davis 6
Snooker	IBSF World Snooker Championship	Individuals		1963	(Pakistan) Muhammad Asif (2024)	2025	Annual	Also known as the World Amateur Snooker Championship
Snowboarding	FIS Snowboard World Championships	Individuals		1996	Winners in 6 events (2025)	2027	Biennial	Not held in Winter Olympic years
Snowboarding	FIS Snowboard World Cup	Individuals		1994	Winners in 8 disciplines (2024–25)	2025–26	Annual	
Snowshoe running	World Snowshoe Championships	Individuals		2006	(Italy) Alex Baldaccini (2024)	2026	Biennial	
Snow volleyball	FIVB Snow Volleyball World Tour	Nations		2019	Iran (2025)	2026	Annual	
Softball	Men's Softball World Cup	Nations	18	1966	Venezuela (2025)	2029	Quadrennial	Quadrennially from 1970 to 2010, biennially till 2019, now triennially
Speed skating	World Allround Speed Skating Championships	Individuals		1889	(United States) Jordan Stolz (2024)	2026	Biennial	
Speed skating	World Sprint Speed Skating Championships	Individuals		1970	(China) Ning Zhongyan (2024)	2026	Biennial	
Speed skating	World Single Distance Championships	Individuals & Nations		1996	Winners in 8 events (2025)	2027	Annual	Not held in Winter Olympic years
Squash	PSA World Championship	Individuals		1976	(Egypt) Mostafa Asal (2025)	2026	Annual	
Squash	World International Doubles Squash Championships	Doubles		1997	(Australia) Bailey Morgan & Raphael Segal (2024)	2026	Biennial	
Squash	World Squash Team Championships	Nations		1967	Egypt (2024)	2026	Biennial	2021 Championship cancelled
Strongman	World's Strongest Man	Individuals		1977	(Canada) Mitchell Hooper (2026)	2027	Annual	
Strongman	The World Deadlift Championships	Individuals		2014	(Iceland) Hafþór Júlíus Björnsson (2025)	2026	Annual	
Sumo	Sumo World Championships	Individuals		1992	Winners in 5 weight classes (2025)	2026	Annual	
Surfing	World Surfing Games	Individuals & Team		1964	(Australia) Dane Henry (2025)	2026	Annual	
Table tennis	World Table Tennis Championships	Singles		1926	(China) Wang Chuqin (2025)	2027	Biennial	
Table tennis	World Table Tennis Championships	Doubles		1926	(Japan) Hiroto Shinozuka & Shunsuke Togami (2025)	2027	Biennial	
Table tennis	World Team Table Tennis Championships	Nations		1926	China (2026)	2028	Biennial	
Taekwondo	World Taekwondo Championships	Individuals		1973	Winners in 8 weight classes (2025)	2027	Biennial	
Taekwondo	World Taekwondo Championships	Nations		1973	South Korea (2023)	2027	Biennial	
Taekwondo	World Cup Taekwondo Team Championships	Nations		2006	Iran (2024)	2026	Biennial	
Tchoukball	World Tchoukball Championship	Nations		1971	Chinese Taipei (2023)	2027	Quadrennial	
Telemark skiing	Telemark World Championships	Individuals		1987	Winners in 3 events (2025)	2027	Biennial	
Teqball	Teqball World Championships	Men's singles		2017	(Romania) Apor Györgydeák (2024)	2025	Annual	
Teqball	Teqball World Championships	Men's doubles		2017	(Thailand) Sorrasak Thaosiri & Jirati Chanliang (2024)	2025	Annual	
Tennis	Davis Cup	Nations		1900	Italy (2025)	2026	Annual	The Davis Cup is not formally a world championship, but is traditionally held as equivalent in status. Only the teams in the World Group actually compete for the Davis Cup proper; other teams play to (eventually) reach the World Group. Most wins: United States 32, Australia 28, France 10
Triathlon	World Triathlon Championship Series	Individuals		2009	(Australia) Matthew Hauser (2025)	2026	Annual	
Triathlon	World Triathlon Long Distance Championships	Individuals		1994	(Spain) Antonio Benito (2024)	2025	Annual	
Triathlon	World Triathlon Duathlon Championships	Individuals		1990	(Spain) Javier Martín (2024)	2025	Annual	
Triathlon	World Triathlon Long Distance Duathlon Championships	Individuals		1997	(France) Émile Blondel-Hermant (2024)	2025	Annual	
Triathlon	World Triathlon Aquathlon Championships	Individuals		1998	(Spain) Kevin Viñuela (2024)	2025	Annual	
Triathlon	World Triathlon Winter Championships	Individuals		1997	(Italy) Franco Pesavento (2024)	2025	Annual	
Triathlon	World Triathlon Cross Championships	Individuals		2011	(France) Félix Forissier (2025)	2026	Annual	
Triathlon	Ironman World Championship	Individuals		1978	(Norway) Casper Stornes (2025)	2026	Annual	
Triathlon	Ironman 70.3 World Championship	Individuals		2006	(Belgium) Jelle Geens (2025)	2026	Annual	
Underwater hockey	Underwater Hockey World Championships	Nations		1980	New Zealand (2023)	TBD	Biennial	
Underwater rugby	Underwater Rugby World Championships	Nations		1980	Colombia (2023)	2027	Quadrennial	
Volleyball	Men's World Cup	Nations	32	1949	Italy (2025)	2027	Biennial	Most wins: Soviet Union 6, Italy 5, Brazil 3, Poland 3
Volleyball	FIVB Men's Volleyball Nations League	Nations	18	2018	Poland (2026)	2027	Annual	It replaced the FIVB Volleyball World League (1990–2017)
Volleyball	FIVB Men's Volleyball Club World Championship	Clubs	8	1989	(Brazil) Sada Cruzeiro (2024)	2025	Annual	
Wakeboarding	Wakeboard World Championships	Individuals		1994	Winners in various events (2025)	2026	Annual	
Water polo	Water polo at the World Aquatics Championships	Nations	16	1973	Spain (2025)	2027	Biennial	Biennially since 2001
Water polo	World Aquatics Water Polo World Cup	Nations	8	1979	Spain (2025)	2027	Biennial	
Water skiing	Water Ski World Championships	Individuals		1949	(Canada) Dorien Llewellyn (2025)	2026	Biennial	
Weightlifting	World Weightlifting Championships	Individuals		1891	Winners in 8 weight classes (2025)	2026	Annual	
Windsurfing	Windsurfing World Championships	Individuals		1974	(Italy) Alessandro Alberti (2024)	2025	Annual	
Wrestling	World Wrestling Championships	Freestyle		1951	Winners in 10 events (2025)	2026	Annual	Not held in Summer Olympic years
Wrestling	World Wrestling Championships	Greco-Roman		1904	Winners in 10 events (2025)	2026	Annual	Not held in Summer Olympic years
Wrestling	Wrestling World Cup (freestyle)	Nations		1973	United States (2022)	2025	Biennial	
Wrestling	Wrestling World Cup (Greco-Roman)	Nations		1980	Iran (2022)	2025	Biennial	
Wushu	World Wushu Championships	Taolu		1991	Winners in 11 events (2025)	2027	Biennial	
Wushu	World Wushu Championships	Sanda		1991	Winners in 12 events (2025)	2027	Biennial	

== Female world championship titles ==
Sport	Competition name	Competing entities	Number of participants	First held	Current holder	Next	Frequency	Details & notes
Alpine skiing	FIS Alpine World Ski Championships	Individuals & Nations		1931	Winners in 5 events (2025)	2027	Biennial	
Alpine skiing	FIS Alpine Ski World Cup	Individuals		1967	(Italy) Federica Brignone (2024–25)	2025–26	Annual	
Alpine skiing	FIS Alpine Ski World Cup	Nations		1967	Italy (2024–25)	2025–26	Annual	
American football	IFAF Women's World Championship	Nations	8	2010	United States (2022)	TBD	Quadrennial	
Armwrestling	World Armwrestling Championship	Individuals		1979	Winners in 16 events (2025)	2026	Annual	Cancelled in 2020 due to the COVID-19 pandemic
Aquatics	Swimming at the World Aquatics Championships	Individuals^{[R]}		1973	Winners in 20 events (2025)	2027	Biennial	
Aquatics	Diving at the World Aquatics Championships	Individuals		1973	Winners in 5 events (2025)	2027	Biennial	
Aquatics	Synchronised swimming at the World Aquatics Championships	Individuals & Nations		1973	Winners in 4 events (2025)	2027	Biennial	
Aquatics	Open water swimming at the World Aquatics Championships	Individuals		1991	Winners in 3 events (2025)	2027	Biennial	
Aquatics	High diving at the World Aquatics Championships	Individuals		2013	(Australia) Rhiannan Iffland (2025)	2027	Biennial	
Aquatics	World Aquatics Swimming Championships (25m)	Individuals^{[R]}		1993	Winners in 21 events (2024)	2026	Biennial	
Aquatics	World Aquatics Swimming World Cup	Individuals		1988–89	(United States) Kate Douglass (2025)	2026	Annual	
Aquatics	World Aquatics Diving World Cup	Individuals		1979	Winners in 4 events (2024)	2026	Biennial	
Aquatics	FINA Marathon Swim World Series	Individuals		2007	(Australia) Moesha Johnson (2026)	2027	Annual	
Aquatics	Red Bull Cliff Diving World Series	Individuals		2014	(Australia) Rhiannan Iffland (2025)	2026	Annual	
Archery	World Archery Championships	Individuals & Nations		1931	Winners in 4 events (2025)	2027	Biennial	
Archery	Archery World Cup	Individual recurve		2006	(South Korea) An San (2025)	2026	Annual	
Archery	Archery World Cup	Individual compound		2006	(Mexico) Mariana Bernal (2025)	2026	Annual	
Archery	World Field Archery Championships	Individuals & Nations		1969	Winners in 4 events (2024)	2026	Biennial	
Athletics	World Athletics Championships	Individuals^{[R]}		1983	Winners in 24 events (2025)	2027	Biennial	1983–1991 quadrennially, biennially from 1993
Athletics	World Athletics Indoor Championships	Individuals^{[R]}		1985	Winners in 13 events (2025)	2026	Biennial	
Athletics	World Athletics Ultimate Championship	Individuals^{[R]}		2026		2026	Biennial	
Athletics	World Athletics Relays	4×100 m women's relay		2014	Jamaica (2026)	2028	Biennial	
Athletics	World Athletics Relays	4×400 m women's relay		2014	Norway (2026)	2028	Biennial	
Athletics	World Athletics Cross Country Championships	Individuals		1973	(Kenya) Agnes Ngetich (2026)	2028	Biennial	
Athletics	World Athletics Cross Country Championships	Nations		1973	Ethiopia (2026)	2028	Biennial	
Athletics	World Athletics Road Running Championships	Individuals		1992	(Kenya) Peres Jepchirchir (2023)	2026	Biennial	
Athletics	World Athletics Road Running Championships	Nations		1992	Kenya (2023)	2026	Biennial	
Athletics	World Mountain and Trail Running Championships	Individuals		1985; 2007	Winners in 10 events (2025)	2026	Biennial	
Athletics	World Athletics Race Walking Team Championships	Individuals & Nations		1961	Winners in 4 events (2024)	2026	Biennial	
Athletics	IAU 50 km World Championships	Individuals		2005	(United Kingdom) Carla Molinaro (2023)	2025	Biennial	2017, 2018 not held
Athletics	IAU 100 km World Championships	Individuals		1987	(France) Floriane Hot (2024)	2026	Biennial	
Athletics	IAU 24 Hour World Championship	Individuals		2001	(United Kingdom) Sarah Webster (2025)	2027	Biennial	
Athletics	IAU 24 Hour World Championship	Nations		2003	Great Britain (2025)	2027	Biennial	
Athletics	Women's Decathlon World Championships	Individuals		2024	(Netherlands) Nikki Boon (2025)	2026	Annual	
Badminton	BWF World Championships	Singles		1977	(Japan) Akane Yamaguchi (2025)	2026	Annual	Not held in Summer Olympic years
Badminton	BWF World Championships	Doubles		1977	(China) Liu Shengshu & Tan Ning (2025)	2026	Annual	Not held in Summer Olympic years
Badminton	Uber Cup	Nations		1957	China (2024)	2026	Biennial	Biennially since 1984 it has been held concurrently with the men's Thomas Cup. Most wins: China 16, Japan 6, Indonesia 3
Ball hockey	Ball Hockey World Championship	Nations	6	2007	United States (2024)	2026	Biennial	
Bandy	Women's Bandy World Championship	Nations	8	2004	Sweden (2026)	2027	Annual	Annually from 2006 to 2008, then biennially
Baseball	Women's Baseball World Cup	Nations	12	2004	Japan (2024)	2027	Biennial	Most wins: Japan 7, United States 2
Basketball	FIBA Women's Basketball World Cup	Nations	16	1953	United States (2026)	2030	Quadrennial	Most wins: United States 12, Soviet Union 6, Australia 1, Brazil 1
Basketball	FIBA 3x3 World Cup	Nations		2012	United States (2026)	2027	Annual	Biennial until 2016
Basque pelota	Basque Pelota World Championships	Individuals & Pairs		1990	Winners in 5 events (2022)	2026	Quadrennial	
Beach handball	World Women's Beach Handball Championship	Nations	16	2004	Germany (2024)	2026	Biennial	
Beach tennis	Beach Tennis World Championship	Individuals		2009	Elizaveta Kudinova & Anastasiia Semenova (2025)	2026	Annual	
Beach volleyball	FIVB Beach Volleyball World Championships	Nations		1997	(United States) Hughes – Cheng (2023)	2025	Biennial	
Beach wrestling	World Beach Wrestling Championships	Individuals		2006	Winners in 4 weight classes (2024)	2025	Annual	
Biathlon	Biathlon World Championships	Individuals & Nations		1984	Winners in 5 events (2025)	2027	Annual	Not held in Winter Olympic years
Biathlon	Summer Biathlon World Championships	Individuals		1996	Winners in 3 events (2024)	2026	Biennial	Cancelled in 2020, 2025
Biathlon	Biathlon World Cup	Individuals		1987–88	(Germany) Franziska Preuß (2024–25)	2025–26	Annual	
Biathlon	Biathlon World Cup	Nations		2000–01	France (2024–25)	2025–26	Annual	
Billiards & Pool	World Women's Billiards Championship	Individuals		1931	(India) Shruthi L (2025)	2026	Annual	
Billiards & Pool	WPA Women's World Nine-ball Championship	Individuals		1990	(Philippines) Rubilen Amit (2024)	2025	Annual	
Bobsleigh	IBSF World Championships	Two woman		2000	(Germany) Laura Nolte & Deborah Levi (2025)	2027	Annual	Not held in Winter Olympic years
Bobsleigh	IBSF World Championships	Monobob		2021	(United States) Kaysha Love (2025)	2027	Annual	Not held in Winter Olympic years
Bobsleigh	Bobsleigh World Cup	Individuals		1993–94	(Germany) Laura Nolte (2024–25)	2025–26	Annual	
Bodybuilding	Ms. Olympia	Ms. Olympia		1980	(United States) Andrea Shaw (2025)	2026	Annual	
Bodybuilding	Ms. Olympia	Fitness		1995	(United Kingdom) Michelle Fredua-Mensah (2025)	2026	Annual	
Bodybuilding	Ms. Olympia	Figure		2003	(United Kingdom) Rhea Gayle (2025)	2026	Annual	
Bodybuilding	Ms. Olympia	Bikini		2010	(Philippines) Maureen Blanquisco (2025)	2026	Annual	
Bodybuilding	Ms. Olympia	Women's Physique		2013	(United States) Natalia Abraham Coelho (2025)	2026	Annual	
Bodybuilding	Ms. Olympia	Wellness		2021	(Brazil) Eduarda Bezerra (2025)	2026	Annual	
Bowling (ten-pin)	QubicaAMF Bowling World Cup	Individuals		1965	(Malaysia) Natasha Roslan (2025)	2026	Annual	
Bowls	World Bowls Championship	Individuals & Nations		1969	Winners in 5 events (2023)	2027	Biennial	
Bowls	World Indoor Bowls Championships	Singles		1988	(Scotland) Julie Forrest (2025)	2026	Annual	
Boxing	IBA Women's World Boxing Championships	Individuals		2001	Winners in 10 weight classes (2025)	2027	Biennial	
Breakdancing	Red Bull BC One	Individuals		2018	(Netherlands) India (2024)	2025	Annual	
Canoeing	ICF Canoe Sprint World Championships	Individuals		1938	Winners in 12 events (2025)	2026	Annual	
Canoeing	ICF Canoe Slalom World Championships	Individuals & Nations		1949	Winners in 6 events (2025)	2026	Annual	Not held in Summer Olympic years
Canoeing	Canoe Slalom World Cup	Individuals		1988	Winners in 4 disciplines (2025)	2026	Annual	
Canoeing	ICF Canoe Marathon World Championships	Individuals		1988	Winners in 5 events (2025)	2026	Annual	
Canoeing	Wildwater Canoeing World Championships	Individuals		1959	Winners in 3 events (2025)	2026	Annual	
Canoe polo	ICF Canoe Polo World Championships	Nations		1994	New Zealand (2024)	2026	Biennial	
Catch wrestling	Snake Pit World Championships	Individuals		2018	Winners in 3 weight classes (2024)	2025	Annual	Not held in 2020 or 2021 due to the COVID-19 pandemic
Climbing	IFSC Climbing World Championships	Individuals		1991	Winners in 3 events (2025)	2027	Biennial	
Climbing	IFSC Climbing World Cup	Individuals & Nations		1989	Winners in 3 disciplines (2025)	2026	Annual	
Cricket	Women's Cricket World Cup (WODI format)	Nations		1973	India (2025)	2029	Quadrennial	Most wins: Australia 7, England 4, New Zealand 1, India 1
Cricket	ICC Women's T20 World Cup (WT20I format)	Nations	12	2009	Australia (2026)	2028	Biennial	Biennially from 2010; Most wins: Australia 7, England 1, New Zealand 1, West Indies 1
Cross-country skiing	FIS Nordic World Ski Championships	Individuals & Nations		1954	Winners in 6 events (2025)	2027	Biennial	Not held in Winter Olympic years
Cross-country skiing	FIS Cross-Country World Cup	Individuals		1978–79	(United States) Jessie Diggins (2024–25)	2025–26	Annual	
CrossFit	CrossFit Games	Individuals		2007	(United Kingdom) Aimee Cringle (2026)	2027	Annual	
Curling	World Curling Championships	Nations		1979	Switzerland (2026)	2027	Annual	2020 cancellation
Cycling	UCI Road World Championships	Road race		1958	(Canada) Magdeleine Vallieres (2025)	2026	Annual	The UCI Road World Championships were first contested in 1927, but women's championships were not added until 1958
Cycling	UCI Road World Championships	Time trial		1994	(Switzerland) Marlen Reusser (2025)	2026	Annual	The UCI Road World Championships were first contested in 1927, but women's championships were not added until 1958
Cycling	UCI Track Cycling World Championships	Individuals & Nations		1958	Winners in 11 events (2025)	2026	Annual	The UCI Track Cycling World Championships were first contested in 1893, but women's championships were not added until 1958
Cycling	UCI Mountain Bike World Championships	Individuals		1990	Winners in 8 events (2025)	2026	Annual	
Cycling	UCI BMX World Championships	Individuals		1982	(United Kingdom) Beth Shriever (2025)	2026	Annual	
Cycling	UCI Urban Cycling World Championships	Freestyle BMX		2017	Flatland: (Japan) Ayuna Miyashima (2024); Park: (United States) Hannah Roberts (2024)	2025	Annual	
Cycling	UCI Urban Cycling World Championships	Trials		2001	Women Elite: (Spain) Alba Riera (2024)	2025	Annual	
Cycling	UCI Cyclo-cross World Championships	Individuals		2000	(Netherlands) Fem van Empel (2025)	2026	Annual	The UCI Cyclo-cross World Championships were first contested in 1950, but a women's championship was not added until 2000
Cycling	UCI Track Cycling Nations Cup	Individuals & Nations		2021	Winners in 7 events (2025)	2026	Annual	
Cycling	UCI Mountain Bike World Cup	Cross-country		1991	(New Zealand) Sammie Maxwell (2025)	2026	Annual	
Cycling	UCI Mountain Bike World Cup	Downhill		1993	(Austria) Valentina Höll (2025)	2026	Annual	
Cycling	UCI Cyclo-cross World Cup	Individuals		2002–03	(Netherlands) Lucinda Brand (2024–25)	2025–26	Annual	
Cycling	UCI BMX Racing World Cup	Individuals		2007	(Australia) Saya Sakakibara (2025)	2026	Annual	
Darts	WDF World Darts Championship	Individuals		2022	(England) Beau Greaves (2024)	2025	Annual	
Darts	WDF World Cup	Nations		1983	Ireland (2025)	2027	Biennial	The WDF World Cup was first contested in 1977, but a women's championship was not added until 1983
Disc golf	PDGA World Championships	Individuals		1983	(United States) Ohn Scoggins (2025)	2026	Annual	
Dodgeball	Dodgeball World Championship	Nations - Foam		2012	Canada (2024)	2026	Biennial	
Dodgeball	Dodgeball World Championship	Nations - Cloth		2019	Austria (2024)	2026	Biennial	
Fencing	World Fencing Championships	Individuals & Nations		1929	Winners in 6 events (2025)	2026	Annual	Championships are not held for Olympic events in Summer Olympic years
Fencing	Fencing World Cup	Foil; Sabre; Épée		1972	(United States) Lee Kiefer (South Korea) Jeon Ha-young (South Korea) Song Se-ra (2024–25)	2025–26	Annual	
Field hockey	FIH Hockey World Cup	Nations	16	1974	Netherlands (2026)	2030	Quadrennial	Most wins: Netherlands 9, Argentina 3, Australia 2, Germany 2
Field hockey	Women's FIH Indoor Hockey World Cup	Nations	12	2003	Poland (2025)	2027	Biennial	
Figure skating	World Figure Skating Championships	Individuals		1906	(United States) Alysa Liu (2025)	2026	Annual	
Figure skating	ISU Grand Prix of Figure Skating	Individuals		1995	(Japan) Kaori Sakamoto (2024–25)	2025–26	Annual	
Finswimming	Finswimming World Championships	Individuals		1976	Winners in 17 events (2024)	2026	Biennial	
Fistball	Fistball World Championships	Nations		1994	Brazil (2024)	2028	Quadrennial	
Flag football	IFAF Flag Football World Championship	Nations	16	2002	Canada (2026)	2028	Biennial	
Floorball	Women's World Floorball Championship	Nations	16	1997	Switzerland (2025)	2027	Biennial	
Football	FIFA Women's World Cup	Nations	32	1991	Spain (2023)	2027	Quadrennial	Most wins: United States 4, Germany 2, Japan 1, Norway 1, Spain 1
Football	FIFA Women's Club World Cup	Clubs	19	2028		2028	Quadrennial	
Football	FIFA Women's Champions Cup	Clubs	6	2026	(England) Arsenal W.F.C. (2026)	2027	Annual	
Freediving	AIDA World Championship	Pool		2013	Winners in 4 disciplines (2025)	2026	Annual	
Freediving	AIDA World Championship	Depth		2013	Winners in 4 disciplines (2025)	2026	Annual	
Freerunning & Parkour	Parkour World Championships	Speed		2022	(Mexico) Ella Bucio (2024)	2026	Biennial	
Freerunning & Parkour	Parkour World Championships	Freestyle		2022	(China) Shang Chunsong (2024)	2026	Biennial	
Freestyle Skiing	FIS Freestyle World Ski Championships	Individuals		1986	Winners in 7 events (2025)	2027	Biennial	Not held in Winter Olympic years
Freestyle Skiing	FIS Freestyle Ski World Cup	Individuals		1980	Winners in 9 disciplines (2024–25)	2025–26	Annual	
Futsal	FIFA Futsal Women's World Cup	Nations	16	2025	Brazil (2025)	2029	Quadrennial	
Futsal	AMF Futsal World Cup	Nations	12	2008	Colombia (2022)	2026	Quadrennial	
Golf	LPGA Tour	Individuals		1950	(Thailand) Jeeno Thitikul (2025)	2026	Annual	
Gymnastics	World Artistic Gymnastics Championships	Individuals & Nations		1934	Winners in 5 events (2025)	2026	Annual	Not held in Olympic Years
Gymnastics	Rhythmic Gymnastics World Championships	Individuals & Nations		1963	Winners in 9 events (2025)	2027	Biennial	Changed from 2005
Gymnastics	Trampoline Gymnastics World Championships	Individuals & Nations		1964	Winners in 7 events (2023)	2025	Biennial	Not held in Summer Olympics years
Gymnastics	Acrobatic Gymnastics World Championships	Pair and Group		1974	Winners in 6 events (2024)	2026	Biennial	
Gymnastics	Aerobic Gymnastics World Championships	Individuals		1995	Winners in 8 events (2024)	2026	Biennial	
Gymnastics	Artistic Gymnastics World Cup	Individuals		1975	Winners in various events (2025)	2026	Annual	
Gymnastics	Rhythmic Gymnastics World Cup	Individuals		1983	Winners in various events (2025)	2026	Annual	
Handball	IHF World Women's Handball Championship	Nations	32	1957	Norway (2025)	2027	Biennial	Most wins: Norway 5, Russia 4, France 3
Hyrox	Hyrox World Championships	Individuals		2018–19	(Germany) Linda Meier (2024–25)	2025–26	Annual	
Hyrox	Hyrox World Championships	Doubles		2018–19	(United States) Lauren Griffith & Lauren Weeks (2024–25)	2025–26	Annual	
Ice climbing	UIAA Ice Climbing World Championships	Lead		2002	(South Korea) Shin Woon Seon (2024)	2026	Biennial	
Ice climbing	UIAA Ice Climbing World Championships	Speed		2002	(Czech Republic) Aneta Loužecká (2024)	2026	Biennial	
Ice hockey	IIHF World Women's Championship	Nations	10	1990	United States (2025)	2026	Annual	Originally held every two years (no championship in 1996). Since 1997, annual except in Winter Olympic years for the top level of competition (champion listed here). Lower levels of the championships used the same schedule until 2014, when they adopted an annual schedule including championships in Olympic years. Cancelled in 2020 due to the COVID-19 pandemic. Most wins: Canada 13, United States 11
Inline hockey	FIRS Inline Hockey World Championships	Nations		2002	United States (2024)	2026	Biennial	
Judo	World Judo Championships	Individuals		1980	Winners in 7 events (2025)	2026	Annual	
Ju-jitsu	Ju-Jitsu World Championships	Individuals		1994	Winners in 14 weight classes (2024)	2025	Annual	
Kabaddi	Kabaddi World Cup (World Kabaddi)	Nations	6	2019	India (2025)	TBD	TBD	
Karate	Karate World Championships	Individuals & Nations		1980	Winners in 8 events (2023)	2025	Biennial	
Kho Kho	Kho Kho World Cup	Nations	19	2025	India (2025)	2027	Biennial	
Kickboxing	WAKO Amateur World Championships	Individuals		1985	Winners in various weight classes (2023)	2025	Biennial	
Kurash	World Kurash Championships	Individuals		1999	Winners in 8 weight classes (2023)	2025	Biennial	
Lacrosse	Women's Lacrosse World Cup	Nations	16	1982	United States (2026)	2030	Quadrennial	
Luge	FIL World Luge Championships	Women's singles		1955	(Germany) Julia Taubitz (2025)	2027	Annual	Not held in Winter Olympic years
Luge	FIL World Luge Championships	Women's doubles		1955	(Austria) Selina Egle & Lara Kipp (2025)	2027	Annual	Not held in Winter Olympic years
Luge	Luge World Cup	Women's singles		1977–78	(Germany) Julia Taubitz (2024–25)	2025–26	Annual	
Luge	Luge World Cup	Women's doubles		2022–23	(Austria) Selina Egle & Lara Kipp (2024–25)	2025–26	Annual	
Luge	FIL World Luge Natural Track Championships	Women's singles		1979	(Italy) Evelin Lanthaler (2025)	2027	Biennial	
Modern pentathlon	World Modern Pentathlon Championships	Individual		1981	(Egypt) Farida Khalil (2025)	2026	Annual	
Modern pentathlon	World Modern Pentathlon Championships	Team		1981	Italy (2025)	2026	Annual	
Modern pentathlon	Modern Pentathlon World Cup	Individuals		1999	(Egypt) Farida Khalil (2025)	2026	Annual	
Motorcycling	FIM Women's Circuit Racing World Championship	Riders		2024	(Spain) Ana Carrasco (2024)	2025	Annual	
Netball	Netball World Cup	Nations	16	1963	Australia (2023)	2027	Quadrennial	
Nordic combined	FIS Nordic World Ski Championships	Individuals		1954	Winners in 2 events (2025)	2027	Biennial	
Nordic combined	FIS Nordic Combined World Cup	Individuals		2020–21	(Germany) Nathalie Armbruster (2024–25)	2025–26	Annual	Not held in Winter Olympic years
Orienteering	World Orienteering Championships	Individuals & Nations		1966	Winners in 3 events (2025)	2026	Annual	Originally biennially, annually since 2003
Orienteering	Orienteering World Cup	Individuals		1986	(Switzerland) Simona Aebersold (2025)	2026	Annual	Unofficial title cups held in 1983 and 1984 (first official cup in 1986); held biennially until 2004, now annually
Padel tennis	Padel World Championship	Nations		1992	Spain (2024)	2026	Biennial	
Pickleball	World Pickleball Championships	Nations		2019	(2025)	2027	Biennial	
Powerlifting	IPF Powerlifting World Championships	Individuals		2011	Winners in various weight classes (2025)	2026	Annual	
Racquetball	Racquetball World Championships	Nations		1981	Mexico (2024)	2026	Biennial	
Real tennis	Real Tennis World Championship	Singles		1985	(United Kingdom) Claire Fahey (2025)	2027	Biennial	
Real tennis	Real Tennis World Championship	Doubles		1985	(United Kingdom) Claire Fahey & Tara Lumley (2025)	2027	Biennial	
Ringette	World Ringette Championships	Nations	7	1990	Finland (2022)	2025	Biennial	Triennially 2010–2016
Rogaining	World Rogaining Championships	Teams		1992	(Estonia) Silver Eensaar & Helen Jürjo (2025)	2027	Biennial	
Roll ball	Roll Ball World Cup	Nations		2011	Kenya (2023)	2025	Biennial	
Roller derby	Roller Derby World Cup	Nations		2011	United States (2025)	2029	Quadrennial	
Roller hockey	Women's Roller Hockey World Cup	Nations		1992	Spain (2024)	2026	Biennial	
Roller sports	Inline Speed Skating World Championships	Individuals		1967	Winners in 11 events (2025)	2026	Annual	
Roller sports	World Inline Cup	Individuals		2000	(Colombia) Aura Quintana (2025)	2026	Annual	
Roller sports	Artistic Skating World Championships	Individuals		1980	(Portugal) Madalena Costa (2025)	2026	Annual	Not held in 2020
Roller sports	World Scootering Championship	Individuals		2019; 2023	Park: (United States) Claire Parks (2024); Street: (United States) Mia Catalano (2024)	2025	Annual	Not held in 2020
Rowing	World Rowing Championships	Nations		1974	Winners in 8 events (2025)	2026	Annual	Championships are not held for Olympic events in Summer Olympic years
Rowing	World Rowing Cup	Nations		1997	Winners in varying numbers of events per stage (2025)	2026	Annual	Three stages
Rowing	World Rowing Indoor Championships	Individuals & Teams		2018	Winners in 6 events (2025)	2026	Annual	
Rugby league	Women's Rugby League World Cup	Nations	8	2000	Australia (2021)	2026	Quadrennial	Quadrennially after 2013. Most wins: Australia 3, New Zealand 3
Rugby union	Women's Rugby World Cup	Nations	16	1991	England (2025)	2029	Quadrennial	Most wins: New Zealand 6, England 3, United States 1. After the first event in 1991, there was a consistent four-year cycle from 1994 to 2014. A new four-year cycle was established in 2017.
Rugby sevens	Rugby World Cup Sevens	Nations	16	2009	Australia (2022)	2026	Quadrennial	The Rugby World Cup Sevens was first contested in 1993, but a women's tournament was not added until 2009
Sailing	Sailing World Championships	Individuals & Pairs		2003	Winners in 4 classes (2023)	2027	Quadrennial	
Sambo	World Sambo Championships	Individuals		1984	Winners in various weight classes (2024)	2025	Annual	
Sepak takraw	ISTAF World Cup	Regu		2022	Thailand (2025)	2027	Biennial	
Sepak takraw	ISTAF World Cup	Doubles		2025	Myanmar (2025)	2027	Biennial	
Sepak takraw	ISTAF World Cup	Quadrant		2022	Vietnam (2025)	2027	Biennial	
Shooting	ISSF World Shooting Championships	Individuals & Nations		1958	Winners in 27 events (2023)	2025	Biennial	
Shooting	ISSF World Shotgun Championships	Individuals & Nations		1967	Winners in 4 events (2022)	2026	Quadrennial	
Shooting	World Running Target Championships	Individuals & Team		1973	Winners in 4 events (2022)	2026	Quadrennial	
Shooting	ISSF World Cup	Individuals		1986	China (2024)	2025	Annual	
Short-track	World Short Track Speed Skating Championships	Individuals & Nations		1976	Winners in 4 events (2025)	2026	Annual	The International Skating Union did not conduct an official World Short Track Championship until 1981, but it began organising international events in 1976. All annual ISU-sanctioned international championships from 1976 to 1980 are now retrospectively recognised as World Championships.
Short-track	ISU Short Track World Tour	Individuals & Nations		2024–25	Winners in 5 disciplines (2024–25)	2025–26	Annual	
Skateboarding	World Skateboarding Championship	Park		2016	(Brazil) Raicca Ventura (2024)	2026	Annual	
Skateboarding	World Skateboarding Championship	Street		2010	(Brazil) Rayssa Leal (2024)	2026	Annual	
Skeleton	IBSF World Championships	Individuals		2000	(Netherlands) Kimberley Bos (2025)	2027	Annual	Not held in Winter Olympic years
Skeleton	Skeleton World Cup	Individuals		1996–97	(Austria) Janine Flock (2024–25)	2025–26	Annual	
Ski jumping	FIS Nordic World Ski Championships	Individuals & Nations		2009	Winners in 3 events (2025)	2027	Biennial	Not held in Winter Olympic years
Ski jumping	FIS Ski Jumping World Cup	Individuals		2011–12	(Slovenia) Nika Prevc (2024–25)	2025–26	Annual	
Ski mountaineering	World Championships of Ski Mountaineering	Individuals		2002	Winners in 4 events (2025)	2027	Biennial	
Snooker	World Women's Snooker Championship	Individuals		1976	(China) Bai Yulu (2025)	2026	Annual	
Snooker	IBSF World Snooker Championship	Individuals		2003	(Thailand) Ploychompoo Laokiatphong (2024)	2025	Annual	Also known as the World Amateur Snooker Championship
Snowboarding	FIS Snowboard World Championships	Individuals		1996	Winners in 6 events (2025)	2027	Biennial	Not held in Winter Olympic years
Snowboarding	FIS Snowboard World Cup	Individuals		1994	Winners in 8 disciplines (2024–25)	2025–26	Annual	
Snowshoe running	World Snowshoe Championships	Individuals		2006	(Argentina) Verónica Galván (2024)	2026	Biennial	
Snow volleyball	FIVB Snow Volleyball World Tour	Nations		2019	Turkey (2025)	2026	Annual	
Softball	Women's Softball World Cup	Nations	18	1965	Japan (2024)	2027	Biennial	Quadrennially from 1970 to 2010, now biennially
Speed skating	World Allround Speed Skating Championships	Individuals		1933	(Netherlands) Joy Beune (2024)	2026	Biennial	
Speed skating	World Sprint Speed Skating Championships	Individuals		1970	(Japan) Miho Takagi (2024)	2026	Biennial	
Speed skating	World Single Distance Championships	Individuals & Nations		1996	Winners in 8 events (2025)	2027	Annual	Not held in Winter Olympic years
Squash	PSA World Championship	Individuals		1979	(Egypt) Nour El Sherbini (2025)	2026	Annual	
Squash	World Doubles Squash Championships	Doubles		1997	(India) Joshna Chinappa & Dipika Pallikal (2024)	2026	Biennial	
Squash	World Squash Team Championships	Nations		1979	Egypt (2024)	2026	Biennial	2021 Championship cancelled
Strongwoman	World's Strongest Woman	Individuals		1997	(United Kingdom) Andrea Thompson (2025)	2026	Annual	
Sumo	Sumo World Championships	Individuals		2001	Winners in 5 weight classes (2025)	2026	Annual	
Surfing	World Surfing Games	Individuals & Team		1964	(Spain) Janire González Etxabarri (2025)	2026	Annual	
Table tennis	World Table Tennis Championships	Singles		1926	(China) Sun Yingsha (2025)	2027	Biennial	
Table tennis	World Table Tennis Championships	Doubles		1926	(China) Wang Manyu & Kuai Man (2025)	2027	Biennial	
Table tennis	World Team Table Tennis Championships	Nations		1933	China (2026)	2028	Biennial	
Taekwondo	World Taekwondo Championships	Individuals		1987	Winners in 8 weight classes (2025)	2027	Biennial	
Taekwondo	World Taekwondo Championships	Nations		1987	Turkey (2023)	2027	Biennial	
Taekwondo	World Cup Taekwondo Team Championships	Nations		2006	Iran (2024)	2026	Biennial	
Tchoukball	World Tchoukball Championships	Nations		1980	Switzerland (2023)	2027	Quadrennial	
Telemark skiing	Telemark World Championships	Individuals		1987	Winners in 3 events (2025)	2027	Biennial	
Teqball	Teqball World Championships	Women's singles		2021	(Thailand) Jutatip Kuntatong (2024)	2025	Annual	
Teqball	Teqball World Championships	Women's doubles		2021	(Thailand) Jutatip Kuntatong & Suphawadi Wongkhamchan (2024)	2025	Annual	
Tennis	Billie Jean King Cup	Nations		1963	Italy (2025)	2026	Annual	Note: The Fed Cup is not formally a world championship, but is traditionally held as equivalent in status. It was called Federation Cup until 1995. Most wins: United States 18, Czech Republic 11, Australia 7
Triathlon	World Triathlon Championship Series	Individuals		2009	(Germany) Lisa Tertsch (2025)	2026	Annual	
Triathlon	World Triathlon Long Distance Championships	Individuals		1994	(France) Charlène Clavel (2024)	2025	Annual	
Triathlon	World Triathlon Duathlon Championships	Individuals		1990	(France) Marion Legrand (2024)	2025	Annual	
Triathlon	World Triathlon Long Distance Duathlon Championships	Individuals		1997	(Germany) Merle Brunnée (2024)	2025	Annual	
Triathlon	World Triathlon Aquathlon Championships	Individuals		1998	(Ukraine) Maryna Kyryk (2024)	2025	Annual	
Triathlon	World Triathlon Winter Championships	Individuals		1997	(Italy) Sandra Mairhofer (2024)	2025	Annual	
Triathlon	World Triathlon Cross Championships	Individuals		2011	(France) Alizée Paties (2025)	2026	Annual	
Triathlon	Ironman World Championship	Individuals		1979	(Norway) Solveig Løvseth (2025)	2026	Annual	
Triathlon	Ironman 70.3 World Championship	Individuals		2006	(United Kingdom) Lucy Charles-Barclay (2025)	2026	Annual	
Underwater hockey	Underwater Hockey World Championships	Nations		1982	Australia (2023)	TBD	Biennial	
Underwater rugby	Underwater Rugby World Championships	Nations		1991	Colombia (2023)	2027	Quadrennial	
Volleyball	Women's World Cup	Nations	32	1952	Italy (2025)	2027	Biennial	Most wins: Soviet Union 5, Japan 3, Cuba 3
Volleyball	FIVB Women's Volleyball Nations League	Nations	18	2018	Turkey (2026)	2027	Annual	It replaced the FIVB Volleyball World Grand Prix (1993–2017)
Volleyball	FIVB Women's Volleyball Club World Championship	Clubs	8	1991	(Italy) Imoco Volley Conegliano (2024)	2025	Annual	
Wakeboarding	Wakeboard World Championships	Individuals		1994	Winners in various events (2025)	2026	Annual	
Water polo	Water polo at the World Aquatics Championships	Nations	16	1986	Greece (2025)	2027	Biennial	Biennially since 2001
Water polo	World Aquatics Women's Water Polo World Cup	Nations	8	1979	Greece (2025)	2027	Biennial	
Water skiing	Water Ski World Championships	Individuals		1949	(United States) Hanna Straltsova (2025)	2026	Biennial	
Weightlifting	World Weightlifting Championships	Individuals		1987	Winners in 8 weight classes (2025)	2026	Annual	
Windsurfing	Windsurfing World Championships	Individuals		1974	(France) Celine Bordier (2024)	2025	Annual	
Wrestling	World Wrestling Championships	Freestyle		1987	Winners in 10 events (2025)	2026	Annual	
Wrestling	Wrestling World Cup	Nations		2001	Ukraine (2022)	2025	Biennial	
Wushu	World Wushu Championships	Taolu		1991	Winners in 11 events (2025)	2027	Biennial	
Wushu	World Wushu Championships	Sanda		2003	Winners in 7 events (2025)	2027	Biennial	

== Mixed-sex world championship titles ==
Sport	Competition name	Competing entities	Number of participants	First held	Current holder	Next	Frequency	Details & notes
Alpine skiing	FIS Alpine World Ski Championships	Team parallel event		2005	Italy (2025)	2027	Annual	
Archery	World Archery Championships	Mixed teams recurve		1931	Spain (2025)	2027	Biennial	
Archery	World Archery Championships	Mixed teams compound		1995	Netherlands (2025)	2027	Biennial	
Archery	World Field Archery Championships	Mixed events		2022	Winners in 3 events (2024)	2026	Biennial	
Aquatics	Swimming at the World Aquatics Championships	4×100 m Mixed freestyle relay		2015	United States (2025)	2027	Biennial	
Aquatics	Swimming at the World Aquatics Championships	4×100 m Mixed medley relay		2015	Neutral Athletes B (2025)	2027	Biennial	
Aquatics	World Aquatics Swimming Championships (25m)	4×50 m Mixed freestyle relay		2014	Italy (2024)	2026	Biennial	
Aquatics	World Aquatics Swimming Championships (25m)	4×50 m Mixed medley relay		2014	Neutral Athletes B (2024)	2026	Biennial	
Aquatics	World Aquatics Swimming Championships (25m)	4×100 m Mixed medley relay		2024	Neutral Athletes B (2024)	2026	Biennial	
Aquatics	Synchronised swimming at the World Aquatics Championships	Duet free routine		2015	(Spain) Dennis González & Iris Tió (2025)	2027	Biennial	
Aquatics	Synchronised swimming at the World Aquatics Championships	Duet technical routine		2015	Aleksandr Maltsev & Mayya Gurbanberdieva (2025)	2027	Biennial	
Aquatics	Synchronised swimming at the World Aquatics Championships	Acrobatic routine		2023	China (2025)	2027	Biennial	
Aquatics	Synchronised swimming at the World Aquatics Championships	Free routine		2007	China (2025)	2027	Biennial	
Aquatics	Synchronised swimming at the World Aquatics Championships	Technical routine		2007	China (2025)	2027	Biennial	
Aquatics	Open water swimming at the World Aquatics Championships	Nations		2011	Germany (2025)	2027	Biennial	
Aquatics	Diving at the World Aquatics Championships	Individuals		2015	Winners in 3 events (2025)	2027	Biennial	
Athletics	World Athletics Championships	4×400 m mixed relay		2019	United States (2025)	2027	Biennial	
Athletics	World Athletics Ultimate Championship	4×100 m mixed relay		2026	United States (2026)	2028	Biennial	
Athletics	World Athletics Ultimate Championship	4×400 m mixed relay		2026	United States (2026)	2028	Biennial	
Athletics	World Athletics Cross Country Championships	Mixed relay		2017	Australia (2026)	2027	Biennial	
Athletics	World Athletics Race Walking Team Championships	Mixed relay		2024	Italy (2024)	2026	Biennial	
Athletics	World Athletics Relays	4×100 m mixed relay		2025	Jamaica (2026)	2027	Biennial	
Athletics	World Athletics Relays	4×400 m mixed relay		2017	United States (2026)	2027	Biennial	
Badminton	BWF World Championships	Mixed Doubles		1977	(France) Thom Gicquel & Delphine Delrue (2026)	2027	Annual	Not held in Summer Olympic years
Badminton	Sudirman Cup	Nations		1989	China (2025)	2027	Biennial	
Baseball5	Baseball5 World Cup	Nations	16	2024	Cuba (2024)	2026	Biennial	
Biathlon	Biathlon World Championships	4 × 6 km W+M relay		2005	France (2025)	2027	Annual	Not held in the Winter Olympic years
Biathlon	Biathlon World Championships	6 km W + 7.5 km M single relay		2021	France (2025)	2027	Annual	Not held in the Winter Olympic years
Bowls	World Indoor Bowls Championships	Mixed Pairs		2004	(Scotland) Jason Banks & Beth Riva (2025)	2026	Annual	
CrossFit	CrossFit Games	Mixed teams		2007	(United States) CrossFit Whip (2026)	2027	Annual	
Cycling	UCI Road World Championships	Mixed team relay		2021	Australia (2025)	2026	Annual	
Cycling	UCI Track Cycling Nations Cup	Nations		2021	Australia (2025)	2026	Annual	
Cycling	UCI Mountain Bike World Championships	Cross-country Team relay		1999	France (2025)	2026	Annual	
Cycling	UCI Urban Cycling World Championships	Team trials		1999	Spain (2024)	2025	Annual	
Curling	World Mixed Doubles Curling Championship	National mixed teams male – female pair		2008	Australia (2026)	2027	Annual	2020 cancellation
Curling	World Mixed Curling Championship	National mixed teams (4 players)		2015	Sweden (2024)	2026	Biennial	2020–2022 championships were cancelled
Dodgeball	Dodgeball World Championship	Nations - Foam		2016	Canada (2024)	2026	Biennial	
Dodgeball	Dodgeball World Championship	Nations - Cloth		2022	Austria (2024)	2026	Biennial	
Equestrian	Dressage World Cup	Individuals		1986	(United Kingdom) Charlotte Fry (2024–25)	2025–26	Annual	
Equestrian	Show Jumping World Cup	Individuals		1979	(France) Julien Epaillard (2025)	2026	Annual	
Equestrian	Driving World Championships	Individuals & Nations		1972	(Australia) Boyd Exell (individual, 2024); Netherlands (team, 2024)	2026	Biennial	
Figure skating	World Figure Skating Championships	National pairs male – female pair from the same nation		1908	(Japan) Riku Miura & Ryuichi Kihara (2025)	2026	Annual	
Figure skating	World Figure Skating Championships	Ice dance male – female pair from the same nation		1952	(United States) Madison Chock & Evan Bates (2025)	2026	Annual	
Figure skating	ISU Grand Prix of Figure Skating	Pairs		1995	(Germany) Minerva Fabienne Hase & Nikita Volodin (2024–25)	2025–26	Annual	
Figure skating	ISU Grand Prix of Figure Skating	Ice dance		1995	(United States) Madison Chock & Evan Bates (2024–25)	2025–26	Annual	
Frisbee	WFDF World Ultimate and Guts Championship	Individuals		1983	United States (2024)	2028	Quadrennial	
Gymnastics	Acrobatic Gymnastics World Championships	Nations		2016	Belgium (2024)	2026	Biennial	
Gymnastics	Acrobatic Gymnastics World Championships	Mixed pairs		1974	Belgium (2024)	2026	Biennial	
Hyrox	Hyrox World Championships	Mixed Doubles		2018–19	(France) Mévéna Pingliez & Quentin Pingliez (2024–25)	2025–26	Annual	
Judo	World Judo Championships	Mixed teams		2017	Georgia (2025)	2026	Annual	
Korfball	IKF World Korfball Championship	Nations	24	1978	Netherlands (2023)	2027	Quadrennial	
Luge	FIL World Luge Championships	Mixed singles		2025	(Germany) Max Langenhan & Julia Taubitz (2025)	2027	Annual	Not held in Winter Olympic years
Luge	FIL World Luge Championships	Mixed doubles		2025	(Austria) Thomas Steu / Wolfgang Kindl & Selina Egle / Lara Kipp (2025)	2027	Annual	Not held in Winter Olympic years
Luge	FIL World Luge Championships	Nations		1989	Germany (2025)	2027	Annual	Not held in Winter Olympic years
Luge	FIL World Luge Natural Track Championships	Nations		2001	(Italy) Evelin Lanthaler & Daniel Gruber (2025)	2027	Biennial	Not held in 2015, 2017 and 2019
Nordic combined	FIS Nordic World Ski Championships	Mixed teams normal hill		2023	Norway (2025)	2027	Annual	Not held in Winter Olympic years
Quidditch	IQA World Cup	Nations		2012	Belgium (2025)	2027	Biennial	Quidditch has rules based on gender, not sex, calling itself a mixed-gender sport
Rogaining	World Rogaining Championships	Mixed teams		1992	Ekaterina Petukhova & Anna Shliapnikova (2025)	2027	Biennial	
Rowing	World Rowing Championships	Mixed double sculls		2025	Ireland (2025)	2026	Annual	
Rowing	World Rowing Championships	Mixed eight		2025	Romania (2025)	2026	Annual	
Sailing	Sailing World Championships	Mixed multihull Nacra 17		2014	(Italy) Ruggero Tita & Caterina Banti (2023)	2027	Quadrennial	
Sailing	Sailing World Championships	Mixed dinghy 470		2023	(Japan) Keiju Okada & Miho Yoshioka (2023)	2027	Quadrennial	
Sepak takraw	ISTAF World Cup	Quadrant	8	2022	Thailand (2025)	2027	Biennial	
Short Track	World Short Track Speed Skating Championships	Nations		2023	Canada (2025)	2026	Annual	
Short Track	ISU Short Track World Tour	Nations		2018–19	Netherlands (2024–25)	2025–26	Annual	
Skeleton	IBSF World Championships	Mixed teams		2020	(United States) Mystique Ro & Austin Florian (2025)	2027	Annual	Not held in Winter Olympic years
Ski jumping	FIS Nordic World Ski Championships	Mixed teams normal hill		2013	Norway (2025)	2027	Annual	Not held in Winter Olympic years
Ski mountaineering	World Championships of Ski Mountaineering	Mixed relay		2023	(France) Emily Harrop & Thibault Anselmet (2025)	2027	Biennial	
Surfing	World Surfing Games	Mixed teams		1964	Australia (2025)	2026	Annual	
Synchronized skating	ISU World Synchronized Skating Championships	Teams		2000	(Finland) Helsinki Rockettes (2024–25)	2025–26	Annual	
Table tennis	World Table Tennis Championships	Mixed doubles		1926	(China) Wang Chuqin & Sun Yingsha (2025)	2027	Biennial	
Telemark skiing	Telemark World Championships	Team parallel sprint		2013	Norway (2025)	2027	Biennial	
Tennis	Hopman Cup	National teams male – female pair		1989	Canada (2025)	2026	Annual	Competitions are played in traditional order: women's singles, men's singles, and mixed doubles
Tennis	United Cup	National teams of men and women		2023	Poland (2026)	2027	Annual	
Teqball	Teqball World Championships	Nations		2017	(Thailand) Suphawadi Wongkhamchan & Phakpong Dejaroen (2024)	2025	Biennial	
Triathlon	World Triathlon Mixed Relay Championships	National teams of two men and two women		2003	France (2026)	2027	Annual	
Wife-carrying	Wife-Carrying World Championships	Mixed pairs		1996	(Finland) Taisto Miettinen & Katja Kovanen (2026)	2027	Annual	

== See also ==
- List of world championships in mind sports
- List of world cups and world championships for juniors and youth
- List of multi-sport events
- List of world cups
- World championship
- World cup

== Notes ==
- R. ^R – One or more relay events, in which three or four competitors compete for their nation, are included for each sex
