= Racquetball at the World Games =

Racquetball was part of the first World Games in 1981 at Santa Clara. These competitions also count as the first Racquetball World Championships. Racquetball was not played at the World Games in 1989, 1997, 2001, and 2005 as no court was available.

== Medalists ==
=== Men's Single ===
Games	Gold	Silver	Bronze
1981 Santa Clara	Ed Andrews (USA)	Mark Martino (USA)	Martin Padilla (MEX)
1985 London	Andy Roberts (USA)	Roger Harripersad (CAN)	Ed Andrews (USA)
1993 The Hague	Michael Bronfeld (USA)	John Ellis (USA)	Sherman Greenfeld (CAN)
2009 Kaohsiung	Jack Huczek (USA)	Rocky Carson (USA)	Vincent Gagnon (CAN)
2013 Cali	Polo Gutierrez (MEX)	Gilberto Mejia (MEX)	Rocky Carson (USA)
2022 Birmingham	Andrés Acuña (CRC)	Rodrigo Montoya (MEX)	Andree Parrilla (MEX)
2025 Chengdu	Conrrado Moscoso (BOL)	Diego Garcia (ARG)	Eduardo Portillo (MEX)

=== Men's Double ===
Games	Gold	Silver	Bronze
1981 Santa Clara	United States (USA); Mark Malowitz; Jeff Kwartler	Mexico (MEX); Raul Canales; Federicq Alvarez	Netherlands (NED); Tom Luykx; Frits Groenendijk

=== Women's Single ===
Games	Gold	Silver	Bronze
1981 Santa Clara	Cindy Baxter (USA)	Barbara Faulkenberry (USA)	Betsy Massie (USA)
1985 London	Cindy Baxter (USA)	Carol Dupuy (CAN)	Crystal Fried (CAN)
1993 The Hague	Michelle Gould (USA)	Malia Bailey (USA)	Carol McFetridge (CAN)
2009 Kaohsiung	Paola Longoria (MEX)	Rhonda Rajsich (USA)	Angela Grisar (CHI)
2013 Cali	Paola Longoria (MEX)	Cristina Amaya (COL)	Rhonda Rajsich (USA)
2022 Birmingham	Paola Longoria (MEX)	Gabriela Martinez (GUA)	Angélica Barrios (BOL)
2025 Chengdu	Maria Jose Vargas (ARG)	Paola Longoria (MEX)	Gabriela Martinez (GUA)

=== Women's Double ===
Games	Gold	Silver	Bronze
1981 Santa Clara	United States (USA); Mary Ann Cluess; Karen Borga	Netherlands (NED); Miriam Wielheesen; Dineke Kool	Mexico (MEX); Martinez; Suarez

=== Mixed Double ===
Games	Gold	Silver	Bronze
2025 Chengdu	United States (USA); Jake Bredenbeck; Naomi Ros	Argentina (ARG); Diego Garcia; Maria Jose Vargas	Canada (CAN); Coby Iwaasa; Frédérique Lambert

== Medal table ==
Rank	Nation	Gold	Silver	Bronze	Total
1	United States (USA)	10	6	4	20
2	Mexico (MEX)	4	4	4	12
3	Argentina (ARG)	1	2	0	3
4	Bolivia (BOL)	1	0	1	2
5	Costa Rica (CRC)	1	0	0	1
6	Canada (CAN)	0	2	5	7
7	Guatemala (GUA)	0	1	1	2
7	Netherlands (NED)	0	1	1	2
9	Colombia (COL)	0	1	0	1
10	Chile (CHI)	0	0	1	1
Totals (10 entries)		17	17	17	51
