= 2007 Trail World Championships =

- Location: (United States) Huntsville
- Date: 8 December 2007
- Competitors: 172 (finisher)

Champions
- Men: (Poland) Jarosław Janicki
- Women: (Japan) Norimi Sakurai

The 2007 Trail World Championships was the 1st edition of the global trail running competition, Trail World Championships, organised by the International Association of Ultrarunners (IAU) and was held in Huntsville, Texas (United States), the 8 December 2007.

== Results ==
=== Men ===
| Rank | Athlete | Country | Time |
|---|---|---|---|
| 1st place, gold medalist(s) | Jarosław Janicki | Poland | 6:07:45 |
| 2nd place, silver medalist(s) | Marc Vanderlinden | Belgium | 6:29:20 |
| 3rd place, bronze medalist(s) | José Azevedo | Luxembourg | 6:32:04 |

=== Women ===
| Rank | Athlete | Country | Time |
|---|---|---|---|
| 1st place, gold medalist(s) | Norimi Sakurai | Japan | 6:34:57 |
| 2nd place, silver medalist(s) | Helena Crossan | Ireland | 7:18:23 |
| 3rd place, bronze medalist(s) | Adela Salt | United Kingdom | 7:22:03 |
