= Racquetball at the 1985 World Games =

1985 World Games - Racquetball
Host	(United Kingdom) London
Dates	July 25-August 4, 1985
Teams	15
Men's Champions
Gold	(United States) Andy Roberts
Silver	(Canada) Roger Harripersad
Bronze	(United States) Ed Andrews
4th place	(Canada) Ross Harvey
Women's Champions
Gold	(United States) Cindy Baxter
Silver	(Canada) Carol Dupuy
Bronze	(Canada) Crystal Fried
4th place	(United States) Mary Dee

The racquetball competition at the 1985 World Games took place from July 25 to August 4 in London, England. Thirty-eight players competed at David Lloyd's Slazenger Racquet Club.

In the men's competition, American Ed Andrews was the defending World Games gold medalist, winning the first competition in 1981, and Canadian Ross Harvey was the reigning World Champion, winning that title in 1984. However, neither player made it to the finals.

Instead, the men's final was between two 20-year-olds, with American Andy Roberts defeating Canadian Roger Harripersad, 15-11, 15-10.

On the women's side, Cindy Baxter of the USA won her second World Games gold medal in London defeating Canadian Carol Dupuy in the final, 15-4, 15-9. Crystal Fried of Canada finished third, as Mary Dee, the other American in the competition, injured her back during the tournament.

== Men's competition ==
Semi-finals
(Canada) Roger Harripersad	15, 15
(United States) Ed Andrews	7, 9
(Canada) Ross Harvey	6, 12
(United States) Andy Roberts	15, 15

Final
(Canada) Roger Harripersad	11, 10
(United States) Andy Roberts	15, 15
Third place
(United States) Ed Andrews	15, 15
(Canada) Ross Harvey	5, 12

== Women's competition ==
Semi-finals
(United States) Cindy Baxter	15, 15
(Canada) Crystal Fried	9, 6
(Canada) Carol Dupuy
(United States) Mary Dee

Final
(United States) Cindy Baxter	15, 15
(Canada) Carol Dupuy	4, 9
Third place
(Canada) Crystal Fried
(United States) Mary Dee

== Team results ==
Final Player Standings
	Men's Competition	Women's Competition
1	(United States) Andy Roberts	(United States) Cindy Baxter
2	(Canada) Roger Harripersad	(Canada) Carol Dupuy
3	(United States) Ed Andrews	(Canada) Crystal Fried
4	(Canada) Ross Harvey	(United States) Mary Dee
5	(Mexico) Arturo Martin	(Netherlands) Marjam Wielhedson
6	(Bolivia) Gustavo Retamozo	(Republic of Ireland) Ann Marie Whelan
7	(Mexico) Raul Armendariz	(Japan) Emiko Kiuchi
8	(Puerto Rico) Willie Rodriguez	(Republic of Ireland) Marie Duigman
