= 2025 Telemark World Championships =

International skiing competition

2025 FIS Telemark World Championships
- Location: Les Contamines-Montjoie, France
- Date: 19–23 March 2025

The 2025 FIS Telemark World Championships were held from 19 to 23 March 2025 in Les Contamines-Montjoie, France.

== Medal summary ==
=== Medal table ===
* Host nation (France)

Rank	Nation	Gold	Silver	Bronze	Total
1	Norway (NOR)	4	1	1	6
2	Germany (GER)	3	0	0	3
3	France (FRA)*	0	4	4	8
4	Sweden (SWE)	0	1	0	1
4	Switzerland (SUI)	0	1	0	1
6	Great Britain (GBR)	0	0	2	2
Totals (6 entries)		7	7	7	21

=== Men's events ===
Event	Gold		Silver		Bronze	
Sprint	Trym Nygaard Løken; Norway	2:04.09	Noé Claye; France	2:07.45	Yoann Rostolan; France	2:08.15
Classic	Trym Nygaard Løken; Norway	1:47.49	Olle Collberg; Sweden	1:50.46	Alexis Page; France	1:51.66
Parallel sprint	Trym Nygaard Løken; Norway		Yoann Rostolan; France		Noé Claye; France	

=== Women's events ===
Event	Gold		Silver		Bronze	
Sprint	Johanna Holzmann; Germany	2:14.41	Augustine Carliez; France	2:19.24	Jasmin Taylor; Great Britain	2:19.84
Classic	Johanna Holzmann; Germany	1:58.94	Argeline Tan Bouquet; France	2:01.98	Jasmin Taylor; Great Britain	2:04.25
Parallel sprint	Johanna Holzmann; Germany		Kaja Bjørnstad Konow; Norway		Gøril Strøm Eriksen; Norway	

=== Mixed events ===
Event	Gold	Silver	Bronze
Team parallel sprint	Norway Kaja Bjørnstad Konow; Trym Nygaard Løken; Jacob Benjamin Alveberg	Switzerland Léa Lathion; Nicolas Michel; Maxime Mosset	France Argeline Tan-Bouquet; Charly Petex; Élie Nabot
