= Niall Darwen =

British professional bodybuilder

- ♂ Professional bodybuilder

Personal info
- Born: 19 March 1999 (age 27)

Best statistics

Professional (Pro) career
- Best win: Mr. Olympia Classic Physique winner
- Predecessor: Ramon Dino

Niall Darwen (born March 19, 1999 (age 27)) is a British professional bodybuilder who competes in the Classic Physique division of the IFBB Pro League. He won the Classic Physique title at the 2026 Mr. Olympia in Las Vegas, Nevada, in September 2026.

== Career ==
Darwen made his professional debut in 2024 and won the Toronto Pro Supershow in the Classic Physique division. He later placed 11th at the 2024 Mr. Olympia. In 2025, he won the Tampa Pro and improved to fifth place at the 2025 Mr. Olympia. In 2026, Darwen won the New York Pro and Pittsburgh Pro before winning the 2026 Mr. Olympia Classic Physique title.

== Competition history ==
Year	Competition	Division	Place
2024	Toronto Pro Supershow	Classic Physique	1st
2024	Mr. Olympia	Classic Physique	11th
2025	Tampa Pro	Classic Physique	1st
2025	Mr. Olympia	Classic Physique	5th
2026	New York Pro	Classic Physique	1st
2026	Pittsburgh Pro	Classic Physique	1st
2026	Mr. Olympia	Classic Physique	1st
