= 1931 World Archery Championships =

- Location: Lwów, Poland
- Start date: August
- Competitors: 21 from 4 nations

The 1931 World Archery Championships was the inaugural edition of the event. It was held in Lwów, Poland in August 1931.

Following the competition, on 4 September, the World Archery Federation (FITA) was formally founded by the four nations which sent representatives to the Championships (Sweden, Czechoslovakia, France, Poland) along with representatives of the United States, Hungary, and Italy.

== Medals summary ==
Event	Gold	Silver	Bronze
Individual	Michał Sawicki; Poland	Janina Kurkowska; Poland	René Allexandre; France
Team	France; René Allexandre; Gaston Quentin; Gaston Ducatel	Poland; Michał Sawicki; Jan Choina; Zbigniew Kosiński	Poland; Janina Kurkowska; Maria Krolówna; Irena Stefańska

== Medals table ==
Rank	Nation	Gold	Silver	Bronze	Total
1	Poland	1	2	1	4
2	France	1	0	1	2
Totals (2 entries)		2	2	2	6

== Results ==
=== Individual ===
Competitors shot arrows from three distances, 30 meters, 40 meters, and 50 meters, at a round static ringed target. The scores in each round were aggregated, and competitors ranked by total score.

Rank	Name	Nation	30m	40m	50m	Total
1	Michał Sawicki	Poland	82	176	220	478
2	Janina Kurkowska	Poland	67	160	240	467
3	René Allexandre	France	51	162	242	455
4	Emil Heilbron	Sweden	90	148	196	434
5	Gaston Quentin	France	66	148	206	420
6	Gaston Ducatel	France	54	138	210	402
7	Irena Stefańska	Poland	72	137	182	391
8	Jan Choina	Poland	54	149	182	385
9	Zygmunt Piwowarski	Poland	52	145	188	385
10	Zbigniew Kosiński	Poland	66	126	190	382
11	Mirosław Teraszkiewicz	Poland	49	134	198	381
12	Paul Demare	France	57	119	177	353
13	Stanisława Sikorówna	Poland	55	136	135	326
14	Irena Komańska	Poland	49	112	162	323
15	Maria Krolówna	Poland	64	103	138	305
16	Kazimierz Sokołowski	Poland	42	106	140	288
17	Maria Kościeszanka	Poland	35	96	118	249
18	Jan Hörn	Czechoslovakia	50	115	67	232
19	Maria Trajdosówna	Poland	24	48	97	169
20	Jaroslay Fiala	Czechoslovakia	22	80	48	150
21	Berta Laskova	Czechoslovakia	31	22	57	110

=== Team ===
An unofficial team competition was also held. Three teams of three archers each entered, two representing Poland and a third team from France, who won the tournament.

Rank	Name	Nation	30m	40m	50m	Total
1	René Allexandre; Gaston Quentin; Gaston Ducatel	France	51; 66; 54	162; 148; 138	242; 206; 210	455; 420; 402
2	Michał Sawicki; Jan Choina; Zbigniew Kosiński	Poland				
3	Janina Kurkowska; Irena Stefańska; Maria Krolówna	Poland				
