= 1974 World Sports Acrobatics Championships =

1st World Sports Acrobatics Championships
- Location: Moscow, Soviet Union
- Start date: 12 June 1974
- End date: 15 June 1974
- Competitors: 56 from 6 nations

The 1974 World Sports Acrobatics Championships were held in Moscow, USSR, in 1974.

== Medal table ==
Rank	Nation	Gold	Silver	Bronze	Total
1	Soviet Union	18	5	1	24
2	Bulgaria	3	11	7	21
3	Poland	0	5	6	11
4	Germany	0	1	4	5
5	Hungary	0	0	1	1
5	United States	0	0	1	1
Totals (6 entries)		21	22	20	63

== Results ==
=== Men's Tumbling ===
==== Overall ====
Rank	Team	Country	Point
Gold medal	Yuri Zikunov	Soviet Union	
Silver medal	Vassily Skakun	Soviet Union	
Bronze medal	Lubomir Angelov	Bulgaria	

==== First Exercise ====
Rank	Team	Country	Point
Gold medal	Vassily Skakun	Soviet Union	
Silver medal	Yuri Zikunov	Soviet Union	
Bronze medal	Lubomir Angelov	Bulgaria	

==== Second Exercise ====
Rank	Team	Country	Point
Gold medal	Vassily Skakun	Soviet Union	
Silver medal	Lubomir Angelov	Bulgaria	
Bronze medal	Nicolai Mikhov	Bulgaria	

=== Men's Pair ===
==== Overall ====
Rank	Team	Country	Point
Gold medal	V. Alimanov, V. Nazarov	Soviet Union	
Silver medal	K. Kirov, D. Draganov	Bulgaria	
Bronze medal	I. Baumann, P. Landgraf	West Germany	

==== First Exercise ====
Rank	Team	Country	Point
Gold medal	V. Alimanov, V. Nazarov	Soviet Union	
Silver medal	K. Kirov, D. Draganov	Bulgaria	
Bronze medal	I. Baumann, P. Landgraf	West Germany	

==== Second Exercise ====
Rank	Team	Country	Point
Gold medal	V. Alimanov, V. Nazarov	Soviet Union	
Silver medal	Slawomir Kielbasinski, Krsysstof Olendrzynski	Poland	
Bronze medal	K. Kirov, D. Draganov	Bulgaria	

=== Men's Group ===
==== Overall ====
Rank	Team	Country	Point
Gold medal		Soviet Union	
Silver medal		Bulgaria	
Bronze medal		West Germany	

==== First Exercise ====
Rank	Team	Country	Point
Gold medal		Soviet Union	
Silver medal		Bulgaria	
Bronze medal		Hungary	

==== Second Exercise ====
Rank	Team	Country	Point
Gold medal		Soviet Union	
Silver medal		Bulgaria	
Bronze medal		West Germany	

=== Women's Tumbling ===
==== Overall ====
Rank	Gymnast	Country	Point
Gold medal	Nadeja Masloboischikova	Soviet Union	
Silver medal	Natalia Timofeyeva	Soviet Union	
Bronze medal	Vania Vassilieva	Bulgaria	

==== First Exercise ====
Rank	Gymnast	Country	Point
Gold medal	Nadeja Masloboischikova	Soviet Union	
Silver medal	Natalia Timofeyeva	Soviet Union	
Bronze medal	Elsbieta Krzopkowska	Poland	

==== Second Exercise ====
Rank	Gymnast	Country	Point
Gold medal	Nadeja Masloboischikova	Soviet Union	
Silver medal	Vania Vassilieva	Bulgaria	
Bronze medal	Denise Tenney	United States	

=== Women's Pair ===
==== Overall ====
Rank	Team	Country	Point
Gold medal	S. Spasova, K. Lecheva	Bulgaria	
Silver medal	B. Adah, M. Lihomska	Poland	
Bronze medal	V. Zwlepukina, T. Burlakova	Soviet Union	

==== First Exercise ====
Rank	Team	Country	Point
Gold medal	S. Spasova, K. Lecheva	Bulgaria	
Silver medal	Doris Jung, Karin Jung	West Germany	
Bronze medal	B. Adah, M. Lihomska	Poland	

==== Second Exercise ====
Rank	Team	Country	Point
Gold medal	S. Spasova, K. Lecheva	Bulgaria	
Silver medal	V. Zwlepukina, T. Burlakova	Soviet Union	
Bronze medal	B. Adah, M. Lihomska	Poland	

=== Women's Group ===
==== Overall ====
Rank	Team	Country	Point
Gold medal		Soviet Union	
Silver medal		Poland	
Bronze medal		Bulgaria	

==== First Exercise ====
Rank	Team	Country	Point
Gold medal		Soviet Union	
Silver medal		Poland	
Bronze medal		Bulgaria	

==== Second Exercise ====
Rank	Team	Country	Point
Gold medal		Soviet Union	
Silver medal		Poland	
Bronze medal		Bulgaria	

=== Mixed Pair ===
==== Overall ====
Rank	Team	Country	Point
Gold medal	G. Savelieva, Y. Saveliev	Soviet Union	
Silver medal	A. Mustafova, R. Harizanov	Bulgaria	
Bronze medal	T. Pshola, Y. Radonj	Poland	

==== First Exercise ====
Rank	Team	Country	Point
Gold medal	G. Savelieva, Y. Saveliev	Soviet Union	
Silver medal	A. Mustafova, R. Harizanov	Bulgaria	
Bronze medal	T. Pshola, Y. Radonj	Poland	

==== Second Exercise ====
Rank	Team	Country	Point
Gold medal	G. Savelieva, Y. Saveliev	Soviet Union	
Silver medal	A. Mustafova, R. Harizanov	Bulgaria	
Bronze medal	T. Pshola, Y. Radonj	Poland	
