= 2024 FINA Diving World Cup =

International diving competition

- Host city: Xi'an, China
- Date: 19–21 April 2024
- Nations: 13
- Website: FINA event page

The 2024 FINA Diving World Cup took place in Xi'an, China, from 19 to 21 April 2024. It was the 25th edition of the diving competition, and the eighth time this specific FINA event was held in China.

The event served as a Super Final to two previous events, Stops 1 and 2 of the Diving World Cup, held in Montreal, Canada (29 February – 3 March 2024) and Berlin, Germany (21 – 24 March 2024).

== Schedule ==
All times are local China Standard Time (UTC+8) and based on approximate entry numbers. They will be subject to revision.

Day	Date	Event	Time
1	19 Apr		
2	20 Apr		
3	21 Apr		

== Medal summary ==
=== Men's events ===
Event	Gold		Silver		Bronze	
3m springboard	Wang Zongyuan; China	525.00	Osmar Olvera; Mexico	475.55	Jack Laugher; Great Britain	472.85
10m platform	Yang Hao; China	557.60	Rikuto Tamai; Japan	531.55	Randal Willars; Mexico	492.50
Synchronized; 3m Springboard	China; Wang Zongyuan and Long Daoyi	474.75	Mexico; Juan Celaya and Osmar Olvera	420.81	Great Britain; Jack Laugher and Anthony Harding	403.89
Synchronized; 10m Platform	China; Yang Hao and Lian Junjie	472.92	Great Britain; Noah Williams and Tom Daley	440.37	Germany; Jaden Eikermann and Timo Barthel	393.09

=== Women's events ===
Event	Gold		Silver		Bronze	
3m springboard	Chen Yiwen; China	376.05	Chiara Pellacani; Italy	301.95	Maddison Keeney; Australia	291.15
10m platform	Chen Yuxi; China	443.20	Quan Hongchan; China	410.70	Andrea Spendolini-Sirieix; Great Britain	344.60
Synchronized; 3m Springboard	Australia; Anabelle Smith and Maddison Keeney	284.67	United States; Kassidy Cook and Sarah Bacon	284.10	Italy; Chiara Pellacani and Elena Bertocchi	268.92
Synchronized; 10m Platform	China; Quan Hongchan and Chen Yuxi	364.86	Canada; Kate Miller and Caeli McKay	296.10	Ukraine; Kseniia Bailo and Sofiia Lyskun	294.42

=== Mixed events ===
Event	Gold		Silver		Bronze	
Team Event	Chen Yiwen; Wang Zongyuan; Yang Hao; Chen Yuxi; China	500.75	Daniel Goodfellow; Tom Daley; Grace Reid; Andrea Spendolini-Sirieix; Great Britain	456.75	Cassiel Rousseau; Emily Meaney; Maddison Keeney; Kurtis Mathews; Australia	440.20

=== Medal table ===
* Host nation (China)

Rank	Nation	Gold	Silver	Bronze	Total
1	China*	8	1	0	9
2	Australia	1	0	2	3
3	Great Britain	0	2	3	5
4	Mexico	0	2	1	3
5	Italy	0	1	1	2
6	Canada	0	1	0	1
6	Japan	0	1	0	1
6	United States	0	1	0	1
9	Germany	0	0	1	1
9	Ukraine	0	0	1	1
Totals (10 entries)		9	9	9	27

== Participating countries ==
A total of 0 countries have confirmed to participate in the event
