= 2025 ISTAF World Cup =

Sepaktakraw tournament

Tournament details
- Host country: India
- City: Bihar
- Dates: 20–25 March 2025
- Teams: 20 countries (from International Sepaktakraw confederations)
- Venue: Patliputra Indoor Stadium

The 2025 ISTAF World Cup was the fifth edition of the ISTAF World Cup, held from 20 to 25 March 2025 at the Patliputra Indoor Stadium, Bihar, India. Twenty-one countries participated in the tournament.

== Participating countries ==
Asia	Europe	Oceania	America
China; Chinese Taipei; India; Indonesia; Iran; Japan; Malaysia; Myanmar; Nepal; Singapore; Sri Lanka; Thailand; Vietnam	France; Germany; Italy; Poland; Switzerland	New Zealand	Brazil; United States

== Medalists ==
=== Men ===
Event	Gold	Silver	Bronze
Doubles	Thailand	Myanmar	Malaysia
Doubles	Thailand	Myanmar	India
Regu	India	Japan	Singapore
Regu	India	Japan	Iran
Quadrant	Thailand	Vietnam	Myanmar
Quadrant	Thailand	Vietnam	India

=== Women ===
Event	Gold	Silver	Bronze
Doubles	Myanmar	India	Japan
Doubles	Myanmar	India	Iran
Regu	Thailand	Vietnam	India
Regu	Thailand	Vietnam	Malaysia
Quadrant	Vietnam	Thailand	India
Quadrant	Vietnam	Thailand	Malaysia

=== Mixed ===
Event	Gold	Silver	Bronze
Quadrant	Thailand	Myanmar	India
Quadrant	Thailand	Myanmar	Vietnam

=== Medal table ===
Rank	Nation	Gold	Silver	Bronze	Total
1	Thailand (THA)	4	1	0	5
2	Myanmar (MYA)	1	2	1	4
2	Vietnam (VIE)	1	2	1	4
4	India (IND)	1	1	5	7
5	Japan (JPN)	0	1	1	2
6	Malaysia (MAS)	0	0	3	3
7	Iran (IRI)	0	0	2	2
8	Singapore (SGP)	0	0	1	1
Totals (8 entries)		7	7	14	28

== Men's doubles ==
=== Group stage ===
==== Group A ====
Pos	Team	Pld	W	L	SD	PD	Pts	Qualification
1	Malaysia	4	4	0	+7	+54	8	Knockout stage
2	India (H)	4	3	1	+3	+24	6	Knockout stage
3	Vietnam	4	2	2	+2	+15	4	
4	Chinese Taipei	4	1	3	−4	−17	2	
5	Poland	4	0	4	−8	−79	0	

Source: Sepak Takraw India
(H) Host

22 March; 08:00	Malaysia	2–0	Chinese Taipei	Patliputra Indoor Stadium, Court 1
22 March; 08:00	15–6, 15–7			Patliputra Indoor Stadium, Court 1

22 March; 08:00	Vietnam	2–0	Poland	Patliputra Indoor Stadium, Court 2
22 March; 08:00	15–7, 15–6			Patliputra Indoor Stadium, Court 2

22 March; 10:15	Malaysia	2–1	Vietnam	Patliputra Indoor Stadium, Court 2
22 March; 10:15	13–15, 15–11, 15–12			Patliputra Indoor Stadium, Court 2

22 March; 10:15	Poland	0–2	India	Patliputra Indoor Stadium, Court 1
22 March; 10:15	3–15, 7–15			Patliputra Indoor Stadium, Court 1

22 March; 12:30	Chinese Taipei	0–2	Vietnam	Patliputra Indoor Stadium, Court 2
22 March; 12:30	9–15, 10–15			Patliputra Indoor Stadium, Court 2

22 March; 12:30	Malaysia	2–0	India	Patliputra Indoor Stadium, Court 1
22 March; 12:30	15–11, 15–10			Patliputra Indoor Stadium, Court 1

22 March; 14:45	Chinese Taipei	0–2	India	Patliputra Indoor Stadium, Court 1
22 March; 14:45	9–15, 13–15			Patliputra Indoor Stadium, Court 1

22 March; 14:45	Malaysia	2–0	Poland	Patliputra Indoor Stadium, Court 2
22 March; 14:45	15–2, 15–5			Patliputra Indoor Stadium, Court 2

22 March; 17:00	Poland	0–2	Chinese Taipei	Patliputra Indoor Stadium, Court 2
22 March; 17:00	3–15, 8–15			Patliputra Indoor Stadium, Court 2

22 March; 17:45	Vietnam	1–2	India	Patliputra Indoor Stadium, Court 1
22 March; 17:45	15–10, 10–15, 7–15			Patliputra Indoor Stadium, Court 1

==== Group B ====
Pos	Team	Pld	W	L	SD	PD	Pts	Qualification
1	Myanmar	3	3	0	+5	+54	6	Knockout stage
2	Thailand	3	2	1	+3	+39	4	Knockout stage
3	Italy	3	1	2	−4	−30	2	
4	Switzerland	3	0	3	−8	−63	0	
5	Indonesia	0	0	0	0	0	0	Withdrew

Source: Sepak Takraw India

22 March; 08:00	Thailand	w.o.	Indonesia	Patliputra Indoor Stadium, Court 2

22 March; 08:45	Myanmar	2–0	Italy	Patliputra Indoor Stadium, Court 1
22 March; 08:45	15–2, 15–4			Patliputra Indoor Stadium, Court 1

22 March; 11:00	Myanmar	2–0	Switzerland	Patliputra Indoor Stadium, Court 1
22 March; 11:00	15–2, 15–7			Patliputra Indoor Stadium, Court 1

22 March; 11:00	Thailand	2–0	Italy	Patliputra Indoor Stadium, Court 2
22 March; 11:00	15–4, 15–3			Patliputra Indoor Stadium, Court 2

22 March; 13:45	Italy	w.o.	Indonesia	Patliputra Indoor Stadium, Court 2

22 March; 13:45	Thailand	2–0	Switzerland	Patliputra Indoor Stadium, Court 1
22 March; 13:45	15–2, 15–3			Patliputra Indoor Stadium, Court 1

22 March; 15:30	Thailand	1–2	Myanmar	Patliputra Indoor Stadium, Court 1
22 March; 15:30	15–10, 7–15, 9–15			Patliputra Indoor Stadium, Court 1

22 March; 15:30	Indonesia	w.o.	Switzerland	Patliputra Indoor Stadium, Court 2

22 March; 17:45	Myanmar	w.o.	Indonesia	Patliputra Indoor Stadium, Court 1

22 March; 17:45	Switzerland	0–2	Italy	Patliputra Indoor Stadium, Court 2
22 March; 17:45	11–15, 2–15			Patliputra Indoor Stadium, Court 2

=== Knockout stage ===
Semi-finals
A1	Malaysia	9	17	15	1
B2	Thailand	15	15	17	2
A2	India	11	12	0
B1	Myanmar	15	15	2

Final
B2	Thailand	15	15	15	2
B1	Myanmar	9	17	13	1

Winner
Men's doubles
2025 ISTAF World Cup
(Thailand)
Thailand
First title

== Men's regu ==
=== Group stage ===
==== Group A ====
Pos	Team	Pld	W	L	SD	PD	Pts	Qualification
1	Japan	2	2	0	+4	+30	4	Knockout stage
2	Nepal	2	1	1	−1	−7	2	
3	France	2	0	2	−3	−23	0	

Source: Sepak Takraw India

24 March; 15:30	Japan	2–0	Nepal	Patliputra Indoor Stadium, Court 1
24 March; 15:30	15–9, 15–6			Patliputra Indoor Stadium, Court 1

24 March; 17:00	Japan	2–0	France	Patliputra Indoor Stadium, Court 1
24 March; 17:00	15–9, 15–6			Patliputra Indoor Stadium, Court 1

24 March; 20:00	Nepal	2–1	France	Patliputra Indoor Stadium, Court 2
24 March; 20:00	8–15, 15–5, 15–10			Patliputra Indoor Stadium, Court 2

==== Group B ====
Pos	Team	Pld	W	L	SD	PD	Pts	Qualification
1	India (H)	2	2	0	+4	19	4	Knockout stage
2	United States	2	1	1	0	+2	2	
3	New Zealand	2	0	2	−4	−21	0	

Source: Sepak Takraw India
(H) Host

24 March; 14:00	India	2–0	New Zealand	Patliputra Indoor Stadium, Court 1
24 March; 14:00	15–5, 15–11			Patliputra Indoor Stadium, Court 1

24 March; 17:00	India	2–0	United States	Patliputra Indoor Stadium, Court 1
24 March; 17:00	17–16, 15–11			Patliputra Indoor Stadium, Court 1

24 March; 19:15	New Zealand	0–2	United States	Patliputra Indoor Stadium, Court 2
24 March; 19:15	11–15, 14–17			Patliputra Indoor Stadium, Court 2

==== Group C ====
Pos	Team	Pld	W	L	SD	PD	Pts	Qualification
1	Singapore	2	2	0	+4	+45	4	Knockout stage
2	Brazil	2	1	1	0	−14	2	
3	Sri Lanka	2	0	2	−4	−31	0	

Source: Sepak Takraw India

24 March; 14:45	Brazil	0–2	Singapore	Patliputra Indoor Stadium, Court 1
24 March; 14:45	1–15, 6–15			Patliputra Indoor Stadium, Court 1

24 March; 17:45	Brazil	2–0	Sri Lanka	Patliputra Indoor Stadium, Court 2
24 March; 17:45	15–12, 15–9			Patliputra Indoor Stadium, Court 2

24 March; 20:00	Singapore	2–0	Sri Lanka	Patliputra Indoor Stadium, Court 1
24 March; 20:00	15–3, 15–5			Patliputra Indoor Stadium, Court 1

==== Group D ====
Pos	Team	Pld	W	L	SD	PD	Pts	Qualification
1	Iran	1	1	0	+2	+13	2	Knockout stage
2	Chinese Taipei	1	0	1	−2	−13	0	
3	Poland	0	0	0	0	0	0	Withdrew

Source: Sepak Takraw India

24 March; 14:45	Chinese Taipei	w.o.	Poland	Patliputra Indoor Stadium, Court 2

24 March; 17:45	Chinese Taipei	0–2	Iran	Patliputra Indoor Stadium, Court 1
24 March; 17:45	7–15, 10–15			Patliputra Indoor Stadium, Court 1

24 March; 20:00	Poland	w.o.	Iran	Patliputra Indoor Stadium, Court 2

=== Knockout stage ===
Semi-finals
A1	Japan	15	11	15	1
C1	Singapore	8	15	13	2
D1	Iran	7	10	0
B1	India	15	15	2

Final
A1	Japan	15	11	14	1
B1	India	11	15	17	2

Winner
Men's regu
2025 ISTAF World Cup
(India)
India
First title

== Men's quadrant ==
=== Group stage ===
==== Group A ====
Pos	Team	Pld	W	L	SD	PD	Pts	Qualification
1	Thailand	2	2	0	+4	+40	4	Knockout stage
2	Singapore	2	1	1	0	+2	2	Knockout stage
3	Sri Lanka	2	0	2	−4	−42	0	

Source: Sepak Takraw India

20 March; 08:00	Thailand	2–0	Singapore	Patliputra Indoor Stadium, Court 1
20 March; 08:00	15–10, 15–4			Patliputra Indoor Stadium, Court 1

20 March; 11:00	Singapore	2–0	Sri Lanka	Patliputra Indoor Stadium, Court 2
20 March; 11:00	15–7, 15–5			Patliputra Indoor Stadium, Court 2

20 March; 14:00	Thailand	2–0	Sri Lanka	Patliputra Indoor Stadium, Court 1
20 March; 14:00	15–3, 15–3			Patliputra Indoor Stadium, Court 1

==== Group B ====
Pos	Team	Pld	W	L	SD	PD	Pts	Qualification
1	Myanmar	3	2	1	+3	+33	4	Knockout stage
2	Vietnam	3	2	1	+2	+18	4	Knockout stage
3	Malaysia	3	2	1	+1	+4	4	
4	France	3	0	3	−6	−55	0	

Source: Sepak Takraw India

20 March; 08:00	Myanmar	2–0	Vietnam	Patliputra Indoor Stadium, Court 2
20 March; 08:00	15–11, 15–7			Patliputra Indoor Stadium, Court 2

20 March; 08:45	France	0–2	Malaysia	Patliputra Indoor Stadium, Court 2
20 March; 08:45	6–15, 7–15			Patliputra Indoor Stadium, Court 2

20 March; 11:00	France	0–2	Vietnam	Patliputra Indoor Stadium, Court 2
20 March; 11:00	9–15, 4–15			Patliputra Indoor Stadium, Court 2

20 March; 14:00	Myanmar	1–2	Malaysia	Patliputra Indoor Stadium, Court 1
20 March; 14:00	15–10, 14–17, 13–15			Patliputra Indoor Stadium, Court 1

21 March; 08:30	Malaysia	0–2	Vietnam	Patliputra Indoor Stadium, Court 1
21 March; 08:30	12–15, 5–15			Patliputra Indoor Stadium, Court 1

21 March; 08:30	Myanmar	2–0	France	Patliputra Indoor Stadium, Court 2
21 March; 08:30	15–4, 15–5			Patliputra Indoor Stadium, Court 2

==== Group C ====
Pos	Team	Pld	W	L	SD	PD	Pts	Qualification
1	Japan	3	2	0	+3	+32	4	Knockout stage
2	Nepal	3	1	1	+1	+6	2	Knockout stage
3	Brazil	3	0	2	−4	−38	0	
4	Indonesia	0	0	0	0	0	0	Withdrew

Source: Sepak Takraw India

20 March; 08:45	Japan	w.o.	Indonesia	Patliputra Indoor Stadium, Court 1

20 March; 11:45	Nepal	2–0	Brazil	Patliputra Indoor Stadium, Court 2
20 March; 11:45	15–6, 15–3			Patliputra Indoor Stadium, Court 2

20 March; 14:45	Nepal	1–2	Japan	Patliputra Indoor Stadium, Court 1
20 March; 14:45	6–15, 15–13, 7–15			Patliputra Indoor Stadium, Court 1

20 March; 14:45	Brazil	w.o.	Indonesia	Patliputra Indoor Stadium, Court 2

21 March; 09:15	Indonesia	w.o.	Nepal	Patliputra Indoor Stadium, Court 1

21 March; 09:15	Brazil	0–2	Japan	Patliputra Indoor Stadium, Court 2
21 March; 09:15	6–15, 7–15			Patliputra Indoor Stadium, Court 2

==== Group D ====
Pos	Team	Pld	W	L	SD	PD	Pts	Qualification
1	India (H)	3	3	0	+4	+32	6	Knockout stage
2	Iran	3	2	1	+3	+17	4	Knockout stage
3	New Zealand	3	1	2	−3	−23	2	
4	United States	3	0	3	−4	−26	0	

Source: Sepak Takraw India
(H) Host

20 March; 11:45	New Zealand	0–2	Iran	Patliputra Indoor Stadium, Court 2
20 March; 11:45	9–15, 10–15			Patliputra Indoor Stadium, Court 2

20 March; 18:15	New Zealand	0–2	India	Patliputra Indoor Stadium, Court 1
20 March; 18:15	7–15, 10–15			Patliputra Indoor Stadium, Court 1

20 March; 19:45	United States	0–2	Iran	Patliputra Indoor Stadium, Court 1
20 March; 19:45	11–15, 10–15			Patliputra Indoor Stadium, Court 1

21 March; 09:15	United States	1–2	India	Patliputra Indoor Stadium, Court 1
21 March; 09:15	15–13, 6–15, 6–15			Patliputra Indoor Stadium, Court 1

21 March; 09:15	Iran	1–2	India	Patliputra Indoor Stadium, Court 1
21 March; 09:15	15–11, 11–15, 12–15			Patliputra Indoor Stadium, Court 1

21 March; 12:15	New Zealand	2–1	United States	Patliputra Indoor Stadium, Court 2
21 March; 12:15	17–16, 10–15, 15–10			Patliputra Indoor Stadium, Court 2

=== Knockout stage ===
Quarter-finals
1A	Thailand	15	15	2
2D	Iran	10	7	0
1B	Myanmar	15	15	2
2C	Nepal	6	5	0
1C	Japan	15	11	10	1
2B	Vietnam	11	15	15	2
2A	Singapore	11	17	11	1
1D	India	15	16	15	2

Semi-finals
1A	Thailand	15	15	15	2
1B	Myanmar	6	17	11	1
2B	Vietnam	15	16	15	2
1D	India	10	17	10	1

Finals
1A	Thailand	15	15	2
2B	Vietnam	1	9	0

Winner
Men's quadrant
2025 ISTAF World Cup
(Thailand)
Thailand
Second title

== Women's doubles ==
=== Group stage ===
==== Group A ====
Pos	Team	Pld	W	L	SD	PD	Pts	Qualification
1	Myanmar	2	2	0	+4	+41	4	Knockout stage
2	Iran	2	1	1	0	+2	2	Knockout stage
3	Poland	2	0	2	−4	−43	0	

Source: Sepak Takraw India

22 March; 11:45	Iran	2–0	Poland	Patliputra Indoor Stadium, Court 1
22 March; 11:45	15–3, 15–7			Patliputra Indoor Stadium, Court 1

22 March; 14:00	Poland	0–2	Myanmar	Patliputra Indoor Stadium, Court 2
22 March; 14:00	2–15, 5–15			Patliputra Indoor Stadium, Court 2

22 March; 17:00	Iran	0–2	Myanmar	Patliputra Indoor Stadium, Court 1
22 March; 17:00	5–15, 7–15			Patliputra Indoor Stadium, Court 1

==== Group B ====
Pos	Team	Pld	W	L	Pts	SD	PD	Qualification
1	India (H)	1	1	0	+2	+5	2	Knockout stage
2	Japan	1	0	1	−2	−5	0	Knockout stage
3	France	0	0	0	0	0	0	Withdrew
4	China	0	0	0	0	0	0	Withdrew

Source: Sepak Takraw India
(H) Host

22 March; 09:30	China	w.o.	India	Patliputra Indoor Stadium, Court 1

22 March; 09:30	France	w.o.	Japan	Patliputra Indoor Stadium, Court 2

22 March; 11:45	China	w.o.	Japan	Patliputra Indoor Stadium, Court 2

22 March; 14:00	France	w.o.	India	Patliputra Indoor Stadium, Court 2

22 March; 16:15	Japan	0–2	India	Patliputra Indoor Stadium, Court 1
22 March; 16:15	15–17, 12–15			Patliputra Indoor Stadium, Court 1

22 March; 16:15	France	No match	China	Patliputra Indoor Stadium, Court 2

=== Knockout stage ===
Semi-finals
1A	Myanmar	15	11	15	2
2B	Japan	7	15	12	1
2A	Iran	5	5	0
1B	India	15	15	2

Final
1A	Myanmar	15	15	2
1B	India	9	9	0

Winner
Women's doubles
2025 ISTAF World Cup
(Myanmar)
Myanmar
First title

== Women's regu ==
=== Group stage ===
==== Group A ====
Pos	Team	Pld	W	L	SD	PD	Pts	Qualification
1	India (H)	3	3	0	+6	+42	6	Knockout stage
2	Malaysia	3	2	1	+2	+38	4	Knockout stage
3	Nepal	3	1	2	−2	−16	2	
4	Poland	3	0	3	−6	−64	0	

Source: Sepak Takraw India
(H) Host

24 March; 15:30	Nepal	2–0	Poland	Patliputra Indoor Stadium, Court 2
24 March; 15:30	15–4, 15–9			Patliputra Indoor Stadium, Court 2

24 March; 16:15	Malaysia	0–2	India	Patliputra Indoor Stadium, Court 1
24 March; 16:15	12–15, 11–15			Patliputra Indoor Stadium, Court 1

24 March; 18:30	Nepal	0–2	India	Patliputra Indoor Stadium, Court 1
24 March; 18:30	7–15, 12–15			Patliputra Indoor Stadium, Court 1

24 March; 18:30	Malaysia	2–0	Poland	Patliputra Indoor Stadium, Court 2
24 March; 18:30	15–3, 15–4			Patliputra Indoor Stadium, Court 2

24 March; 22:00	Malaysia	2–0	Nepal	Patliputra Indoor Stadium, Court 2
24 March; 22:00	15–4, 15–4			Patliputra Indoor Stadium, Court 2

24 March; 22:00	India	2–0	Poland	Patliputra Indoor Stadium, Court 1
24 March; 22:00	15–3, 15–3			Patliputra Indoor Stadium, Court 1

==== Group B ====
Pos	Team	Pld	W	L	SD	PD	Pts	Qualification
1	Thailand	2	2	0	+4	+34	4	Knockout stage
2	Vietnam	2	1	1	0	+12	2	Knockout stage
3	Sri Lanka	2	0	2	−4	−50	0	
4	France	0	0	0	0	0	0	Withdrew

Source: Sepak Takraw India

24 March; 14:00	Vietnam	2–0	Sri Lanka	Patliputra Indoor Stadium, Court 2
24 March; 14:00	15–3, 15–3			Patliputra Indoor Stadium, Court 2

24 March; 16:15	France	w.o.	Thailand	Patliputra Indoor Stadium, Court 1

24 March; 19:15	Vietnam	w.o.	France	Patliputra Indoor Stadium, Court 2

24 March; 21:00	Thailand	2–0	Sri Lanka	Patliputra Indoor Stadium, Court 1
24 March; 21:00	15–1, 15–3			Patliputra Indoor Stadium, Court 1

24 March; 22:45	France	w.o.	Sri Lanka	Patliputra Indoor Stadium, Court 2

24 March; 22:45	Thailand	2–0	Vietnam	Patliputra Indoor Stadium, Court 1
24 March; 22:45	15–10, 15–12			Patliputra Indoor Stadium, Court 1

=== Knockout stage ===
Semi-finals
A1	India	7	6	0
B2	Vietnam	15	15	2
A2	Malaysia	4	2	0
B1	Thailand	15	15	2

Final
B2	Vietnam	11	12	0
B1	Thailand	15	15	2

Winner
Women's regu
2025 ISTAF World Cup
(Thailand)
Thailand
Second title

== Women's quadrant ==
=== Group stage ===
==== Group A ====
Pos	Team	Pld	W	L	SD	PD	Pts	Qualification
1	Malaysia	4	3	0	+5	+37	8	Knockout stage
2	India (H)	4	2	1	+3	+15	6	Knockout stage
3	Nepal	4	1	2	−4	+8	4	
4	Iran	4	0	3	−6	−34	2	
5	China	4	0	0	0	0	0	Withdrew

Source: Sepak Takraw India
(H) Host

20 March; 10:15	Malaysia	2–0	Iran	Patliputra Indoor Stadium, Court 1
20 March; 10:15	15–11, 15–7			Patliputra Indoor Stadium, Court 1

20 March; 10:15	China	w.o.	Nepal	Patliputra Indoor Stadium, Court 2

20 March; 13:45	Malaysia	2–0	Nepal	Patliputra Indoor Stadium, Court 2
20 March; 13:45	15–9, 15–7			Patliputra Indoor Stadium, Court 2

20 March; 13:45	China	w.o.	India	Patliputra Indoor Stadium, Court 1

20 March; 15:30	Iran	0–2	India	Patliputra Indoor Stadium, Court 1
20 March; 15:30	9–15, 7–15			Patliputra Indoor Stadium, Court 1

20 March; 16:15	China	w.o.	Malaysia	Patliputra Indoor Stadium, Court 2

20 March; 19:00	Nepal	0–2	India	Patliputra Indoor Stadium, Court 1
20 March; 19:00	9–15, 9–15			Patliputra Indoor Stadium, Court 1

20 March; 13:45	China	w.o.	Iran	Patliputra Indoor Stadium, Court 2

21 March; 10:00	Iran	0–2	Nepal	Patliputra Indoor Stadium, Court 2
21 March; 10:00	12–15, 10–15			Patliputra Indoor Stadium, Court 2

21 March; 10:45	Malaysia	2–1	India	Patliputra Indoor Stadium, Court 2
21 March; 10:45	15–17, 15–10, 15–7			Patliputra Indoor Stadium, Court 2

==== Group B ====
Pos	Team	Pld	W	L	SD	PD	Pts	Qualification
1	Thailand	4	4	0	+8	+54	8	Knockout stage
2	Vietnam	4	3	1	+4	+47	6	Knockout stage
3	Myanmar	4	2	2	0	+12	4	
4	Japan	4	1	3	−3	−21	2	
5	Sri Lanka	4	0	4	−8	−92	0	

Source: Sepak Takraw India

20 March; 09:30	Vietnam	2–0	Japan	Patliputra Indoor Stadium, Court 1
20 March; 09:30	15–6, 15–3			Patliputra Indoor Stadium, Court 1

20 March; 09:30	Myanmar	2–0	Sri Lanka	Patliputra Indoor Stadium, Court 2
20 March; 09:30	15–5, 15–5			Patliputra Indoor Stadium, Court 2

20 March; 12:30	Vietnam	2–0	Myanmar	Patliputra Indoor Stadium, Court 1
20 March; 12:30	15–12, 15–10			Patliputra Indoor Stadium, Court 1

20 March; 12:30	Sri Lanka	0–2	Thailand	Patliputra Indoor Stadium, Court 2
20 March; 12:30	4–15, 2–15			Patliputra Indoor Stadium, Court 2

20 March; 15:30	Vietnam	2–0	Sri Lanka	Patliputra Indoor Stadium, Court 2
20 March; 15:30	15–2, 15–3			Patliputra Indoor Stadium, Court 2

20 March; 16:15	Myanmar	2–0	Japan	Patliputra Indoor Stadium, Court 1
20 March; 16:15	15–8, 17–15			Patliputra Indoor Stadium, Court 1

20 March; 18:15	Vietnam	0–2	Thailand	Patliputra Indoor Stadium, Court 2
20 March; 18:15	10–15, 13–15			Patliputra Indoor Stadium, Court 2

21 March; 10:00	Japan	0–2	Thailand	Patliputra Indoor Stadium, Court 1
21 March; 10:00	7–15, 9–15			Patliputra Indoor Stadium, Court 1

21 March; 11:30	Myanmar	0–2	Thailand	Patliputra Indoor Stadium, Court 1
21 March; 11:30	10–15, 11–15			Patliputra Indoor Stadium, Court 1

21 March; 11:30	Sri Lanka	0–2	Japan	Patliputra Indoor Stadium, Court 2
21 March; 11:30	6–15, 1–15			Patliputra Indoor Stadium, Court 2

=== Knockout stage ===
Semi-finals
A1	Malaysia	11	4	0
B2	Vietnam	15	15	2
A2	India	12	9	0
B1	Thailand	15	15	2

Final
B2	Vietnam	15	12	15	2
B1	Thailand	12	15	13	1

Winner
Women's quadrant
2025 ISTAF World Cup
(Vietnam)
Vietnam
First title

== Mixed quadrant ==
=== Group stage ===
==== Group A ====
Pos	Team	Pld	W	L	SD	PD	Pts	Qualification
1	Thailand	3	3	0	+5	+28	6	Knockout stage
2	Myanmar	3	2	1	+2	+31	4	Knockout stage
3	Malaysia	3	1	2	−1	+9	2	
4	Sri Lanka	3	0	3	−6	−68	0	

Source: Sepak Takraw India

23 March; 16:45	Thailand	2–1	Malaysia	Patliputra Indoor Stadium, Court 1
23 March; 16:45	16–17, 17–16, 15–10			Patliputra Indoor Stadium, Court 1

23 March; 16:45	Sri Lanka	0–2	Myanmar	Patliputra Indoor Stadium, Court 2
23 March; 16:45	3–15, 3–15			Patliputra Indoor Stadium, Court 2

23 March; 18:15	Thailand	2–0	Myanmar	Patliputra Indoor Stadium, Court 1
23 March; 18:15	17–16, 17–15			Patliputra Indoor Stadium, Court 1

23 March; 18:15	Sri Lanka	0–2	Malaysia	Patliputra Indoor Stadium, Court 2
23 March; 18:15	2–15, 4–15			Patliputra Indoor Stadium, Court 2

23 March; 19:45	Myanmar	2–0	Malaysia	Patliputra Indoor Stadium, Court 1
23 March; 19:45	15–8, 15–12			Patliputra Indoor Stadium, Court 1

23 March; 19:45	Thailand	2–0	Sri Lanka	Patliputra Indoor Stadium, Court 2
23 March; 19:45	15–4, 15–6			Patliputra Indoor Stadium, Court 2

==== Group B ====
Pos	Team	Pld	W	L	SD	PD	Pts	Qualification
1	India (H)	3	3	0	+6	+36	6	Knockout stage
2	Vietnam	3	2	1	+2	+23	4	Knockout stage
3	Nepal	3	1	2	−3	−33	0	
4	Japan	3	0	3	−5	−26	2	

Source: Sepak Takraw India
(H) Host

23 March; 16:00	Nepal	0–2	India	Patliputra Indoor Stadium, Court 1
23 March; 16:00	6–15, 6–15			Patliputra Indoor Stadium, Court 1

23 March; 16:00	Japan	0–2	Vietnam	Patliputra Indoor Stadium, Court 2
23 March; 16:00	11–15, 5–15			Patliputra Indoor Stadium, Court 2

23 March; 17:30	Vietnam	0–2	India	Patliputra Indoor Stadium, Court 1
23 March; 17:30	11–15, 15–17			Patliputra Indoor Stadium, Court 1

23 March; 17:30	Japan	1–2	Nepal	Patliputra Indoor Stadium, Court 2
23 March; 17:30	15–7, 15–17, 9–15			Patliputra Indoor Stadium, Court 2

23 March; 19:00	Japan	0–2	India	Patliputra Indoor Stadium, Court 1
23 March; 19:00	6–15, 12–15			Patliputra Indoor Stadium, Court 1

23 March; 19:00	Vietnam	2–0	Nepal	Patliputra Indoor Stadium, Court 2
23 March; 19:00	15–7, 15–8			Patliputra Indoor Stadium, Court 2

=== Knockout stage ===
Semi-finals
A1	Thailand	15	17	2
B2	Vietnam	9	14	0
A2	Myanmar	15	15	2
B1	India	12	9	0

Final
A1	Thailand	15	15	2
A2	Myanmar	8	7	0

Winner
Mixed quadrant
2025 ISTAF World Cup
(Thailand)
Thailand
First title
