= Racquetball at the 1981 World Games =

The racquetball events of World Games I were held on August 1–2, 1981, at the Decathlon Club in Santa Clara, California, in the United States. These were the first World Games, an international quadrennial multi-sport event, and were hosted by the city of Santa Clara. This racquetball competition also served as the first Racquetball World Championships tournament in the sport of racquetball. In addition to the five nations mentioned below, athletes from Japan also participated in the competition.

== Medalists ==
Event	Gold	Silver	Bronze
Men
Single	Ed Andrews (USA)	Mark Martino (USA)	Martin Padilla (MEX)
Double	Mark Malowitz; Jeff Kwartler (USA)	Raul Canales; Federico Alvarez (MEX)	Tony Luykx; Frits Groenendijk (NED)
Women
Single	Cindy Baxter (USA)	Barbara Faulkenberry (USA)	Betsy Massie (USA)
Double	Mary Ann Cluess; Karen Borga (USA)	Miriam Wielheesen; Dineke Kool (NED)	Susan Martinez; Armida Suarez (MEX)

== Details ==
=== Men ===
==== Singles ====
Finals – Ed Andrews, USA, d. Mark Martino, USA, 21-19, 21-5; Martin Padilla, Mexico, d. Larry Fox, USA, 21-6, 18-21, 15-14.

Gold, Andrews. Silver, Martino. Bronze, Padilla.

==== Doubles ====
Finals – Mark Malowitz–Jeff Kwartler, USA, d. Raul Canales–Federico Alvarez, Mexico, 21-7, 18-21, 15-1; Tony Luyckx–Frits Groenendyk, Netherlands, d. William Wenzel–Jorg Harnold, West Germany, 21-6, 21-19.

Gold, Malowitz–Kwartler. Silver, Canales–Alvarez. Bronze, Luyckx–Groenendyk.

Men's Teams:

USA Team Members: Ed Andrews (#1 Singles), Larry Fox (#2 Singles), Mark Martino (#3 Singles), Jeff Kwartler/Mark Malowitz (Doubles), Scott Schafer (Alternate Singles 1), Jack Newman (Alternate Singles 2)

=== Women ===
==== Singles ====
Finals – Cindy Baxter, USA, d. Barbara Faulkenberry, USA, 21-6, 18-21, 15-2; Betsy Massie, USA, d. Mirjam Wielhassen, Netherlands, 21-10, 21-2.

Gold, Baxter. Silver, Faulkenberry. Bronze, Massie.

==== Doubles ====
Finals – Karen Borga–Mary Ann Cluess, USA, d. Mirjam Wielhassen–Dineke Kool, Netherlands, 21-13, 21-9; Susan Martinez–Armida Suarez, Mexico, d. Catherine Donegan–Mavis O'Toole, Ireland, 21-5, 21-1.

Gold, Borga–Cluess. Silver, Wielhassen–Kool. Bronze, Martinez–Suarez.
