= Fistball World Championships =

International association fistball competition

Fistball World Championships (FWC) are an international association fistball competition contested by the senior national teams of the members of the International Fistball Association (IFA) since 1968 for men and 1992 for women. In additional, under-18 Fistball World Championships have been hosted for male youth since 2003 and female youth since 2006.

== All-time medal table ==
See: Results

1. Men's (1968-2023) - 16 Editions
2. Women's (1994-2024) - 10 Editions
3. U18 Boys' Youth (2003-2024) - 10 Editions
4. U18 Girls' Youth (2006-2024) - 9 Editions

Rank	Nation	Gold	Silver	Bronze	Total
1	Germany	33	8	5	46
2	Brazil	7	13	19	39
3	Austria	4	16	15	35
4	Switzerland	1	8	9	18
Totals (4 entries)		45	45	48	138

* Both nations won bronze medals in 2006 and 2010 Youth FWCs * Germany includes (FRG) and (GDR) results

== Men’s FWCs ==
=== Results summary ===
#	Year	Host	Date	Gold	Silver	Bronze
1	1968	(Austria); Linz	Jul 6–9	West Germany	Austria	East Germany
2	1972	Schweinfurt, West Germany	Aug 17–20	West Germany	Brazil	Austria
3	1976	(Brazil); Novo Hamburgo	Oct 9–10	West Germany	Brazil	Austria
4	1979	(Switzerland); St. Gallen	Aug 31 – Sep 2	West Germany	Austria	Brazil
5	1982	Hannover, West Germany	Sep 17–19	West Germany	Brazil	Switzerland
6	1986	(Argentina); Buenos Aires	Oct 10–12	West Germany	Austria	Brazil
7	1990	(Austria); Vöcklabruck	Sep 19–23	West Germany	Austria	Brazil
8	1992	(Chile); Llanquihue	Nov 23–29	Germany	Austria	Brazil
9	1995	(Namibia); Windhoek	Aug 29 – Sep 2	Germany	Switzerland	Austria
10	1999	(Switzerland); Olten	Aug 25–29	Brazil	Germany	Austria
11	2003	(Brazil); Porto Alegre	Nov 16–23	Brazil	Germany	Austria
12	2007	(Germany); Oldenburg	Aug 6–12	Austria	Brazil	Germany
13	2011	(Austria); Wien	Aug 7–13	Germany	Austria	Brazil
14	2015	(Argentina); Córdoba	Nov 14–22	Germany	Switzerland	Austria
15	2019	(Switzerland); Winterthur	Aug 11–17	Germany	Austria	Brazil
16	2023	(Germany); Mannheim	Jul 22–29	Germany	Austria	Brazil
17	2027	(Brazil); Novo Hamburgo	Oct

=== Medal table ===
#	Nation	1st place, gold medalist(s)	2nd place, silver medalist(s)	3rd place, bronze medalist(s)
1	West Germany	7	0	0
2	Germany	6	2	1
3	Brazil	2	4	7
4	Austria	1	8	6
5	Switzerland	0	2	1
6	East Germany	0	0	1

== Women’s FWCs ==
=== Results summary ===
#	Year	Host	Date	Gold	Silver	Bronze
1	1994	(Argentina); Buenos Aires	Oct 7–9	Germany	Austria	Brazil
2	1998	(Austria); Villach and Linz	Sep 2–5	Germany	Switzerland	Brazil
3	2002	(Brazil); Curitiba	Nov 6–10	Switzerland	Brazil	Germany
4	2006	(Switzerland); Jona	Jul 27–30	Germany	Brazil	Austria
5	2010	(Chile); Santiago	Nov 18–21	Brazil	Germany	Austria
6	2014	(Germany); Dresden	Jul 30 – Aug 3	Germany	Austria	Brazil
7	2016	(Brazil); Curitiba	Nov 23–30	Germany	Brazil	Switzerland
8	2018	(Austria); Linz	Jul 24–28	Germany	Switzerland	Brazil
9	2021	(Austria); Grieskirchen	Jul 28–31	Germany	Austria	Switzerland
10	2024	(Argentina); Montecarlo	Nov 7–10	Brazil	Germany	Switzerland
11	2026	(Chile); Llanquihue	Oct 29–Nov 1,

=== Medal table ===
#	Nation	1st place, gold medalist(s)	2nd place, silver medalist(s)	3rd place, bronze medalist(s)
1	Germany	7	2	1
2	Brazil	2	3	4
3	Switzerland	1	2	3
4	Austria	0	3	2

== U18 Boys’ Youth FWCs ==
=== Results summary ===
#	Year	Host	Date	Gold	Silver	Bronze
1	2003	(Italy); Bozen	Jun 19–20	Brazil	Austria	Germany
2	2006	(Chile); Llanquihue	Jan 4–7	Germany	Brazil	& Switzerland and Austria
3	2009	(Namibia); Swakopmund	Jan 1–4	Germany	Switzerland	Brazil
4	2010	(Spain); Lloret de Mar	Jul 22–25	Germany	Brazil	Switzerland
5	2012	(Colombia); Cali	Jul 26–29	Brazil	Switzerland	Germany
6	2014	(Brazil); Pomerode	Apr 16–20	Germany	Brazil	Austria
7	2016	(Germany); Nuremberg	Jul 20–24	Germany	Austria	Brazil
8	2018	(United States); New Jersey	Jul 11–15	Brazil	Germany	Austria
9	2021	(Austria); Grieskirchen	Jul 29 – Aug 1	Germany	Austria	Brazil
10	2024	(Chile); Llanquihue	Oct 31 – Nov 3	Germany	Brazil	Austria

=== Medal table ===
#	Nation	1st place, gold medalist(s)	2nd place, silver medalist(s)	3rd place, bronze medalist(s)
1	Germany	7	1	2
2	Brazil	3	4	3
3	Austria	0	3	4
4	Switzerland	0	2	2

== U18 Girls’ Youth FWCs ==
=== Results summary ===
#	Year	Host	Date	Gold	Silver	Bronze
1	2006	(Chile); Llanquihue	Jan 4–7	Germany	Switzerland	& Brazil and Austria
2	2009	(Namibia); Swakopmund	Jan 1–4	Austria	Germany	Switzerland
3	2010	(Spain); Lloret de Mar	Jul 22–25	Germany	Switzerland	& Brazil and Austria
4	2012	(Colombia); Cali	Jul 26–29	Austria	Germany	Brazil
5	2014	(Brazil); Pomerode	Apr 16–20	Germany	Austria	Brazil
6	2016	(Germany); Nuremberg	Jul 20–24	Germany	Brazil	Switzerland
7	2018	(United States); New Jersey	Jul 11-15	Germany	Brazil	Austria
8	2021	(Austria); Grieskirchen	Jul 29 – Aug 1	Germany	Austria	Brazil
9	2024	(Chile); Llanquihue	Oct 31 – Nov 3	Austria	Germany	Switzerland

=== Medal table ===
#	Nation	1st place, gold medalist(s)	2nd place, silver medalist(s)	3rd place, bronze medalist(s)
1	Germany	6	3	0
2	Austria	3	2	3
3	Brazil	0	2	5
4	Switzerland	0	2	3

== See also ==
- Fistball European Championships
- Asia-Pacific Fistball Championships
