= Fistball at the World Games =

Fistball was introduced as a World Games sport for men at the 1985 World Games in London. At the 2022 World Games in Birmingham, women's Fistball was included in the programme.

== Results ==
=== Men ===
Year	Host	Gold	Silver	Bronze
1985	London, United Kingdom	West Germany	Austria	Switzerland
1989	Karlsruhe, West Germany	West Germany	Brazil	Austria
1993	The Hague, Netherlands	Germany	Switzerland	Austria
1997	Lahti, Finland	Germany	Austria	Brazil
2001	Akita, Japan	Austria	Brazil	Germany
2005	Duisburg, Germany	Austria	Brazil	Germany
2009	Kaohsiung, Chinese Taipei	Brazil	Switzerland	Austria
2013	Cali, Colombia	Germany	Switzerland	Austria
2017	Wrocław, Poland	Germany	Switzerland	Austria
2022	Birmingham, United States of America	Germany	Switzerland	Brazil
2025	Chengdu, China	Brazil	Germany	Austria

Fistball at the 2025 World Games

=== Women ===
Year	Host	Gold	Silver	Bronze
2022	Birmingham, United States of America	Germany	Switzerland	Brazil
2025	Chengdu, China	Brazil	Switzerland	Germany

Fistball at the 2022 World Games

Fistball at the 2025 World Games
