= 2010 Continental Championships =

2010 Continental Championships may refer to:

== African Championships ==
- Athletics: 2010 African Championships in Athletics
- Football (soccer): 2010 Africa Cup of Nations
- Football (soccer): 2010 CAF Champions League
- Football (soccer): 2010 CAF Confederation Cup

== Asian Championships ==
- Football (soccer): AFC Champions League 2010
- Multisport: 2010 Asian Games
- Multisport: 2010 Asian Beach Games

== European Championships ==
- Aquatics: 2010 European Aquatics Championships
- Athletics: 2010 European Athletics Championships
- Darts: 2010 European Championship Darts
- Figure Skating: 2010 European Figure Skating Championships
- Fistball: 2010 European Men's Fistball Championship
- Football (soccer): 2009–10 UEFA Champions League
- Football (soccer): 2009–10 UEFA Europa League
- Football (soccer): 2010 UEFA European Under-17 Football Championship
- Football (soccer): UEFA Women's Champions League 2009–10
- Handball: 2010 European Men's Handball Championship
- Handball: 2010 European Women's Handball Championship
- Pitch and Putt: 2010 Pitch and putt European Championship
- Rhythmic Gymnastics: 2010 Rhythmic Gymnastics European Championships
- Taekwondo: 2010 European Taekwondo Championships
- Volleyball: Men's CEV Champions League 2009-10
- Volleyball: Women's CEV Champions League 2009-10
- Water Polo: 2010 Men's European Water Polo Championship
- Water Polo: 2010 Women's European Water Polo Championship
- Weightlifting: 2010 European Weightlifting Championships

== Oceanian Championships ==
- Football (soccer): OFC Champions League 2009-10
- Swimming: 2010 Oceania Swimming Championships

== Pan American Championships / North American Championships ==
- Football (soccer): CONCACAF Champions League 2009-10
- Football (soccer): 2010 CONCACAF Women's Gold Cup
- Judo: 2010 Pan American Judo Championships

== South American Championships ==
- Football (soccer): 2010 Copa Libertadores
- Multisport: 2010 South American Games

== See also ==
- Continental championship (disambiguation)
- 2010 World Championships (disambiguation)
- 2010 World Junior Championships (disambiguation)
- 2010 World Cup (disambiguation)
