= Fistball at the 2017 World Games =

- Venue: Olawka Stadium
- Location: Wrocław
- Dates: 22–25 July 2017
- Teams: 6

Medalists
gold medal	Germany
silver medal	Switzerland
bronze medal	Austria

The fistball event at the World Games 2017 in Wrocław, Poland took place between the 22nd and the 25th of July.

== Schedule ==
July	20	21	22	23	24	25	26	27	28	29	30	Gold medals
Fistball			●	●	●	1						1

== Qualification ==
A total of 6 teams will compete in the fistball event at the World Games 2017.

The 2015 Men's Fistball World Championships acted as the qualification tournament. Six teams qualified for the World Games.

=== Qualified teams ===
Team	Date of qualification	Method of qualification	Finals appearance	Previous appearance
Germany	22 November 2015	Finished 1st at the 2015 IFA WCC	9th	2013
Switzerland	22 November 2015	Finished 2nd at the 2015 IFA WCC	9th	2013
Austria	22 November 2015	Finished 3rd at the 2015 IFA WCC	9th	2013
Brazil	22 November 2015	Finished 4th at the 2015 IFA WCC	9th	2013
Argentina	22 November 2015	Finished 5th at the 2015 IFA WCC	5th	2013
Chile	22 November 2015	Finished 6th at the 2015 IFA WCC	4th	2013

== Preliminary round ==
Team	Pld	W	L	SW	SL	SD
Austria	5	4	1	13	7	+6
Germany	5	4	1	13	6	+7
Brazil	5	3	2	11	11	0
Switzerland	5	3	2	13	7	+6
Argentina	5	1	4	4	13	–9
Chile	5	0	5	5	15	–10

Date	Time		Score		Set 1	Set 2	Set 3	Set 4	Set 5	Total
22 July	11:00	Germany	3–1	Argentina	11–1	11–6	11–8			
22 July	12:15	Switzerland	2–3	Brazil	11–6	7–11	11–9	8–11	11–13	
22 July	13:30	Austria	3–2	Chile	8–11	9–11	11–9	11–8	11–5	
22 July	15:00	Brazil	3–1	Argentina	11–7	7–11	11–8	11–5		
22 July	16:15	Germany	1–3	Austria	8–11	11–9	8–11	6–11		
22 July	17:30	Switzerland	3–0	Chile	11–4	11–3	11–8			
23 July	11:00	Germany	3–0	Chile	11–9	11–4	11–0			
23 July	12:15	Switzerland	3–0	Argentina	11–5	11–8	11–2			
23 July	13:30	Brazil	3–2	Chile	10–12	13–11	8–11	11–7	11–5	
23 July	15:00	Austria	3–0	Argentina	11–3	11–4	11–9			
23 July	16:15	Germany	3–1	Brazil	10–12	11–3	11–7	11–5		
23 July	17:30	Switzerland	3–1	Austria	12–10	11–5	8–11	11–8		
24 July	11:00	Austria	3–1	Brazil	12–10	12–14	11–8	11–9		
24 July	12:15	Germany	3–2	Switzerland	14–15	12–10	8–11	11–7	11–6	
24 July	13:30	Argentina	3–1	Chile	11–4	11–8	6–11	11–9		

== Knockout stage ==
=== Semifinals ===
Date	Time		Score		Set 1	Set 2	Set 3	Set 4	Set 5	Total
24 July	15:30	Germany	3–0	Brazil	11–6	11–5	11–7			
24 July	17:00	Austria	0–3	Switzerland	13–15	9–11	11–13			

=== Fifth place game ===
Date	Time		Score		Set 1	Set 2	Set 3	Set 4	Set 5	Total
25 July	11:00	Argentina	0–3	Chile	5–11	9–11	7–11			

=== Third place game ===
Date	Time		Score		Set 1	Set 2	Set 3	Set 4	Set 5	Total
25 July	13:00	Brazil	2–3	Austria	11–5	10–12	1–11	12–10	5–11	

=== Final ===
Date	Time		Score		Set 1	Set 2	Set 3	Set 4	Set 5	Set 6	Set 7	Total
25 July	15:00	Germany	4–3	Switzerland	9–11	7–11	11–6	7–11	11–8	12–10	11–9	

== Final ranking ==
Rank	Team
Gold medal	Germany
Silver medal	Switzerland
Bronze medal	Austria
4	Brazil
5	Chile
6	Argentina
