= 2018 Men's Asia-Pacific Fistball Championship =

2018 Asia-Pacific Fistball Championships
Tournament details
- Host country: Australia
- Dates: 22–24 November 2018
- Teams: 4
- Venue: 1 (in 1 host city)

Final positions
- Champions: New Zealand
- Runners-up: Australia
- Third place: India
- Fourth place: Samoa

Tournament statistics
- Matches played: 10

The 2nd Men's Asia-Pacific Fistball Championships in fistball was held from the 22 to 24 November 2018 at Kevin Bartlett Reserve in Burnley, Melbourne in Australia. It was the first time the Men's Asia-Pacific Fistball Championships have been held in Australia.

New Zealand were crowned Asia-Pacific Champions for the first time, defeating Australia 4:3 in the final.

== Participants ==
4 teams took part in the 2018 Asia-Pacific Fistball Championships, equalling the number of teams at the previous Asia-Pacific Championships in 2014.

The 2 returning teams from the 2014 Asia-Pacific Men's Championships in Pakistan, Australia and India, were joined by New Zealand and Samoa, who were competing for their first time.

Pakistan were a late withdrawal from the competition due to visa complications.

The 4 teams that competed in the 2018 Asia-Pacific Fistball Championships in Australia were:

1 from Asia	India
3 from Oceania	Australia	New Zealand	Samoa

== Structure ==
All matches of the Asia-Pacific Championships were played to four winning sets (best of seven sets).

=== Round Robin Stage ===
- In the round robin stage the 4 competing teams played off against each other to determine rankings for the Semi Finals.

=== Semi Finals ===
- The #1 ranked team played against the #4 ranked team, with the winning teams progressing to the final and the losing team relegated to the 3rd Place Playoff.
- The #2 ranked team played against the #3 ranked team, with the winning team progressing to the final and the losing team relegated to the 3rd Place Playoff.

=== Finals ===
- The winners of the Semi Finals played off in the Final
- The losers of the Semi Finals played off in the Bronze Medal Match

== Schedule & Results ==
=== Round Robin Stage ===
Rank	Team	Matches	Sets	Scores	Points
1	New Zealand	3:0	12:4	164:132	6
2	Australia	2:1	11:4	153:107	4
3	India	1:2	4:8	96:121	2
4	Samoa	0:3	1:12	96:149	0

22.11.2018	Australia	–	Samoa	4:0	(11:6, 11:5, 11:6, 11:5)
22.11.2018	New Zealand	–	Samoa	4:1	(11:6, 11:8, 13:15, 11:6,11:6)
23.11.2018	New Zealand	–	India	4:0	(11:4, 11:9, 11:7, 11:6)
23.11.2018	Australia	–	India	4:0	(11:5, 11:5, 11:8, 11:4)
23.11.2018	Samoa	–	India	0:4	(9:11, 5:11, 13:15, 6:11)
23.11.2018	New Zealand	–	Australia	4:3	(5:11, 4:11, 7:11, 11:8, 11:9, 14:12, 11:3)

=== Semi Finals ===
24.11.2018	New Zealand	–	Samoa	4:1	(11:6, 11:9, 11:8, 8:11, 12:10)
24.11.2018	Australia	–	India	4:0	(11:5, 11:4, 11:3, 11:2)

=== Bronze Medal Match (3rd/4th Placing) ===
24.11.2018	India	–	Samoa	4:1	(14:12, 11:6, 6:11, 13:11, 11-8)

=== Final ===
24.11.2018	Australia	–	New Zealand	3:4	(3:11, 15:13, 7:11, 11:9, 6:11, 12:10, 12:10)

== Final standings ==
Rank	Country
1	New Zealand
2	Australia
3	India
4	Samoa
