= Asia Fistball Association =

Asian sports federation

- Abbreviation: AFA
- Founded: 9 May 2021

The Asia Fistball Association (AFA) is the Asian continental federation of the International Fistball Association and serves to unite the national fistball associations of Asia. The AFA was founded as part of a video conference of the participating associations and the IFA.

== Organization ==
=== President ===
Cheng Tsz-man from Hong Kong, China, was elected the first president of the AFA in 2021 and represents it internally and externally.

=== Presidium AFA ===
The Presidium of the Asia Fistball Association is elected for a period of two years. The current executive committee includes five people. In addition, there are a total of three assistants.

Executive Committee of the AFA
Name	Nationality	Function	From	Until
Cheng Tsz-man	Hong Kong	President	May 9, 2021	
S.Kevin Anandaraj	India	Vice president	May 9, 2021	
Chan Tik-hei	Hong Kong	Member of the Executive Committee	May 9, 2021	
Lee Po-Yi	Chinese Taipei	Member of the Executive Committee	May 9, 2021	
Waichiro Horiuchi	Japan	Member of the Executive Committee	May 9, 2021	

President Assistant: Wong Kwun-fung (Hong Kong)

== Associations ==
Currently, the Asian Fistball Association has 13 member associations.

Member associations PAFA
Land	Association	Abbreviation
Afghanistan	Fistball Federation of the Islamic Republic of Afghanistan	
China	Chinese Fistball Promotion Committee	
Hong Kong	Fistball Association of Hong Kong China	
India	Fistball Federation of India	FFI
Iran	Fistball Iran	
Japan	Japan Fistball Association	JFA
South Korea	South Korea Fistball Federation	
Kuwait	Kuwait Fistball Federation	
Mongolia	Fistball Mongolia	
Nepal	Everest Fistball Club Nepal	
Pakistan	Pakistan Fistball Federation	
Sri Lanka	Fistball Association of Sri Lanka	
Chinese Taipei	Chinese Taipei Fistball Association	CTFAT

== World Cup participants ==
In 1999, the Japanese men's national fistball team took part in a fistball world championship for the first time. To date, four different nations have participated in World Championships.

=== Men ===
Year	Participant	
1999	Japan	
2003	Japan	
2007	Japan	Chinese Taipei
2011	Japan	
2015	Pakistan	
2019	Japan	
2023	Japan	

=== Women ===
Year	Participant
2002	Japan
2006	Japan

=== Male U18 ===
Year	Participant
2016	India

=== Female U18 ===
Year	Participant
2016	India
