= Fistball at the 2001 World Games =

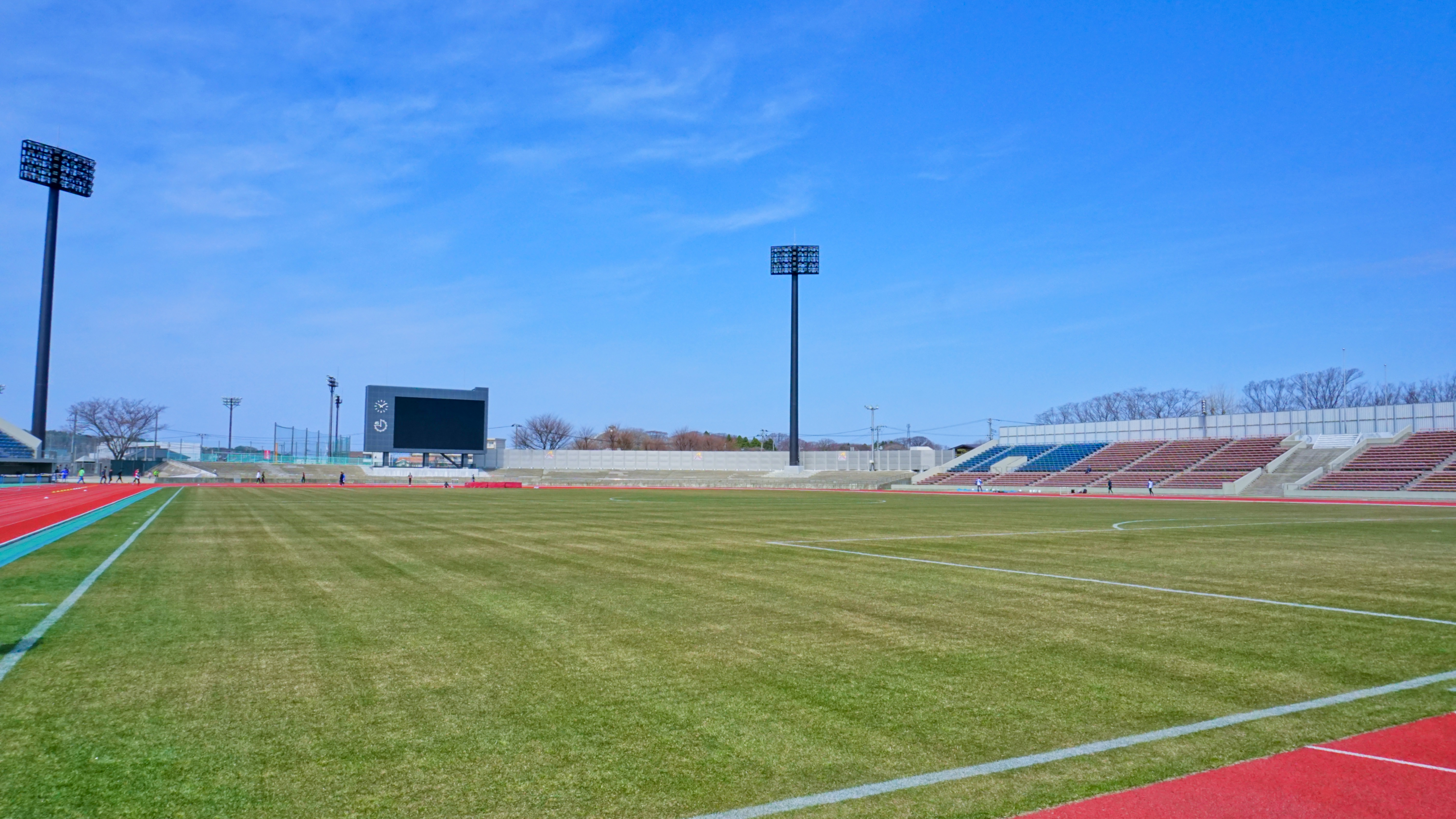
- Yabase Stadium
- Venue: Yabase Stadium
- Location: (Japan) Akita
- Dates: 18–20 August 2001
- Competitors: 40 from 5 nations

Medalists
gold medal	Austria
silver medal	Brazil
bronze medal	Germany

The fistball event at the 2001 World Games in Akita, Japan took place between the 18th and the 20th of August. A total of 40 athletes from 5 teams entered the competition. The competition took place at Yabase Stadium.

== Competition format ==
In preliminary round teams played round-robin system. After end of this stage first and second team advanced to the final. In consolation round rest of the teams played again in round-robin format and winner of this stage got third place in the tournament.

== Teams ==
- Austria
- Brazil
- Germany
- Japan
- Switzerland

== Preliminary round ==
Team	Pld	W	L	SW	SL	SD
Brazil	4	4	0	8	0	+8
Austria	4	3	1	7	3	+4
Germany	4	2	2	5	4	+1
Switzerland	4	1	3	2	6	–4
Japan	4	0	4	0	8	–8

Date	Time		Score		Set 1	Set 2	Set 3	Total	Report
18 August		Brazil	2–0	Japan	20–5	20–8		40–13	
18 August		Germany	1–2	Austria	20–17	15–20	17–20	52–57	
18 August		Switzerland	2–0	Japan	20–3	20–10		40–13	
18 August		Brazil	2–0	Austria	22–20	21–19		43–39	
18 August		Germany	2–0	Switzerland	20–14	20–16		40–30	
19 August		Japan	0–2	Austria	0–20	3–20		3–40	
19 August		Brazil	2–0	Switzerland	20–9	20–9		40–18	
19 August		Germany	2–0	Japan	20–6	20–3		40–9	
19 August		Austria	2–0	Switzerland	20–15	20–16		40–31	
19 August		Brazil	2–0	Germany	20–14	20–18		40–32	

== Consolation round ==
Date	Time		Score		Set 1	Set 2	Set 3	Total	Report
20 August		Switzerland	2–0	Japan	20–4	20–10		40–14	
20 August		Germany	2–0	Japan	20–6	20–3		40-9	
20 August		Germany	2–1	Switzerland	17–20	20–12	22-20	59–52	

== Final ==
Date	Time		Score		Set 1	Set 2	Set 3	Set 4	Set 5	Total
20 August		Brazil	2–3	Austria	10–20	22–24	20–16	20–13	16–20	88–93

== Final ranking ==
Rank	Team
Gold medal	Austria
Silver medal	Brazil
Bronze medal	Germany
4	Switzerland
5	Japan
