= 2010 World Junior Championships =

2010 World Junior Championships may refer to:

- Athletics: 2010 World Junior Championships in Athletics
- Baseball: 2010 World Junior Baseball Championship
- Curling: 2010 World Junior Curling Championships
- Figure skating: 2010 World Junior Figure Skating Championships
- Ice hockey: 2010 World Junior Ice Hockey Championships
- Motorcycle speedway:
  - 2010 Individual Speedway Junior World Championship
  - 2010 Team Speedway Junior World Championship

== See also ==
- 2010 World Cup (disambiguation)
- 2010 Continental Championships (disambiguation)
- 2010 World Championships (disambiguation)
