= 2010 World Championships =

2010 World Championships may refer to:

- Aquatics: 2010 FINA World Swimming Championships (25 m)
- Athletics: 2010 IAAF World Indoor Championships
  - Cross-country running: 2010 IAAF World Cross Country Championships
  - Half marathon: 2010 IAAF World Half Marathon Championships
- Badminton: 2010 BWF World Championships
- Basketball:
  - 2010 FIBA World Championship
  - 2010 FIBA World Championship for Women
- Chess: World Chess Championship 2010
- Curling:
  - 2010 World Men's Curling Championship
  - 2010 Ford World Women's Curling Championship
  - 2010 World Mixed Doubles Curling Championship
- Darts: 2010 BDO World Darts Championship
- Darts: 2010 PDC World Darts Championship
- Figure skating: 2010 World Figure Skating Championships
- Fencing: 2010 World Fencing Championships
- Gymnastics
  - Artistic Gymnastics 2010 World Artistic Gymnastics Championships
  - Rhythmic Gymnastics 2010 World Rhythmic Gymnastics Championships
- Men's Lacrosse: 2010 World Lacrosse Championship
- Ice hockey: 2010 Men's World Ice Hockey Championships
- Ringette: 2010 World Ringette Championships
- Speed skating:
  - Allround: 2010 World Allround Speed Skating Championships
  - Sprint: 2010 World Sprint Speed Skating Championships
- Snooker: 2010 World Snooker Championship
- Table tennis: 2010 World Team Table Tennis Championships
- Volleyball:
  - 2010 FIVB Men's World Championship
  - 2010 FIVB Women's World Championship
- Wheelchair basketball: 2010 Wheelchair Basketball World Championship

== See also ==
- 2010 World Cup (disambiguation)
- 2010 Continental Championships (disambiguation)
- 2010 World Junior Championships (disambiguation)
