= 1986 Men's Fistball World Championships =

The 1986 Men's Fistball World Championships was the 6th edition of the men's World Fistball Championships. It was held from 10 October to 12 October 1986 in Buenos Aires, Argentina.

== Final standings ==
Rank	Team
1st place, gold medalist(s)	West Germany
2nd place, silver medalist(s)	Austria
3rd place, bronze medalist(s)	Brazil
