= Dirk Schachtsiek =

German fistball player (born 1965)

Dirk Schachtsiek (born November 4, 1965) is a German fistball player, recognized at "Europe's player of the century".

== Biography ==
During the late 1980s and the early 1990s, Schachtsiek was the most renowned fistball player in the world. As a representative of Germany's national team, Schachtsiek won four world titles (1986, 1990, 1992 and 1995). He was also a European champion in 1988 and 1994. At the World Games, in which non-Olympic sports are represented, Schachtsiek won the gold medal in 1989 in 1993.

Playing for TSV Hagen 1860, a team located in the federal state of Northrhine-Westfalia, Schachtsiek amassed 17 national titles (ten outdoors and seven indoors). In 1986, Schachtsiek was a German champion for the first time. The last time he placed first was 2001. Schachtsiek and Hagen were also world cup winners, accumulating twelve consecutive titles on the European club level (indoors). Schachtsiek also led Hagen to seven outdoor titles.

Schachtsiek's father-in-law, Manfred Lux, is the mastermind of fistball, editing the "Faustball Informationen". Schachtsiek still plays on the senior level. He is one of the four vice-presidents of the German fistball League (Deutsche Faustball-Liga-DFBL). Unofficially, he is the manager of Germany's national team, which allows a comparison to Oliver Bierhoff in football. Amongst fistballers, Schachtsiek is highly revered.

Schachtsiek lives in Hagen.
