= 2011 Men's Fistball World Championships =

- 2011 Men's Fistball World Championships official logo

Tournament details
- Host country: Austria
- Dates: 7–13 August 2011
- Teams: 12
- Venue(s): 5 (in 5 host cities)

Final positions
- Champions: Germany
- Runners-up: Austria
- Third place: Brazil
- Fourth place: Argentina

Tournament statistics
- Matches played: 56

The 13th Men's World Fistball Championships was held from the 7th to 13 August 2011 in Austria. A total of 24 teams qualified for the World Championships, with those 24 teams initially split into four pools of three teams for the preliminary rounds. These preliminary rounds were followed by qualifying matches leading into the quarterfinals, semifinals, and then a final. In addition, classification matches were held for places three to twelve to determine final placings. Germany was crowned World Champion after defeating defending champions Austria 4:2 in the final, recording their record 10th Men's Fistball World Championship.

The preliminary rounds were held in Kremsmünster, Linz, Salzburg and Wien, the quarterfinals in Linz, and the classification and finals matches at Waldstadion in Pasching.

This was the third time a Men's Fistball World Championships was held on Austria soil, after the inaugural 1968 World Championships in Linz, and the 1990 World Championships in Vöcklabruck.

== Participants ==
The World Championships were played with 12 participants, qualifying from the 24 member states and 11 partner associations of the International Fistball Association.

=== Qualifications ===
From the listed 35 member associations of the IFA, 12 teams qualified (highlighted) for the 2011 Men's Fistball World Championships.

Europe: Albania, Denmark, Germany, Italy, Catalonia, Austria, Switzerland, Serbia, Iceland, Malta, Cyprus, Poland, Sweden, Belgium, Moldova, France, Ukraine, Hungary, Belarus, Greece, Czech Republic

America: Argentina, Brazil, Chile, United States, Paraguay, Uruguay, Mexico, Peru

Asia: Japan, Taiwan, India, Nepal, Pakistan

Africa: Namibia

== Structure ==
All matches of the World Championships were played to three winning sets (best of five sets) except for the semifinals, Third Place Playoff and Final; which were played to four winning sets (best of seven sets).

=== Preliminary round ===
- In the first round (A to D) was played with three teams a simple round into four groups. The games took place in Vienna and Salzburg.

=== Second round ===
All matches in the second round took place in Kremsmünster and Linz.

- The four group winners of the preliminary round played in the second round in Group E, the four third-placed teams played in Group F.
- The four runners-up of the group stage played off in qualifiers to determine which two winning teams would move to Group E, with the two defeated teams moving to Group F.
- All team in Group E and the top two teams in Group F played in the quarterfinals with the matchups of 1.E vs 2.F, 2.E vs 1.F, 3.E vs 6.E and 4.E vs 5.E.
- The third to sixth-placed teams in Group F played in Qualifying Matches to determine rankings for the classification matches to be played for positions 9th to 12th.
- The losing teams from the quarterfinals also played in Qualifying Matches to determine rankings for the classification matches to be played for positions 5th to 8th

=== Final round ===
The matches being played for the Final, Third Place Playoff and Classification matches were played at Waldstadion in Pasching.

- The winners of the quarterfinals played off in the Final
- The losers of the quarterfinals played off in the Third-place final
- All other teams played off for final positions.

== Venues ==
All matches were played across 5 locations in Austria, with the final round held in Pasching.

Location	Stadium	Capacity	Location	Stadium	Capacity
Wien	Johann-Hoffmann-Platz	1,500	Salzburg	Salzburg - Rif	1,500+
Kremsmünster	Faustballzentrum Kremsmünster	2,300	Pasching	Waldstadion	6,000
Linz	ÖFBB Leistungszentrum	2,000+			

== Schedule ==
=== Preliminary Rounds ===
Group A and B matches were played in Vienna, Group C and D in Salzburg

==== Group A ====
Group Table
Rank	Team	Sets	Scores	Points
1	Austria	6:1	75:43	4
2	Argentina	4:3	52:62	2
3	United States	0:6	34:66	0

Game Results
07.08.2011	Argentina	–	USA	3:0	(11:9, 11:7, 11:4)
07.08.2011	Austria	–	USA	3:0	(11:8, 11:4, 11:2)
07.08.2011	Austria	–	Argentina	3:1	(11:7, 11: 6, 8:11, 11:5)

==== Group B ====
Group Table
Rank	Team	Sets	Scores	Points
1	Brazil	6:0	66:33	4
2	Namibia	3:3	50:50	2
3	Serbia	0:6	33:66	0

Game Results
07.08.2011	Namibia	–	Serbia	3:0	(11:4, 11:6, 11:7)
07.08.2011	Brazil	–	Serbia	3:0	(11:5, 11:6, 11:5)
07.08.2011	Brazil	–	Namibia	3:0	(11:5, 11:5, 11:7)

==== Group C ====
Group Table
Rank	Team	Sets	Scores	Points
1	Germany	6:0	66:28	4
2	Italy	3:3	52:55	2
3	Japan	0:6	34:69	0

Game Results
07.08.2011	Italy	–	Japan	3:0	(11:2, 11:8, 14:12)
07.08.2011	Germany	–	Japan	3:0	(11:4, 11:4, 11:4)
07.08.2011	Germany	–	Italy	3:0	(11:5, 11:7, 11:4)

==== Group D ====
Group Table
Rank	Team	Sets	Scores	Points
1	Switzerland	6:0	67:36	4
2	Chile	3:3	55:52	2
3	Czech Republic	0:6	32:66	0

Game Results
07.08.2011	Chile	–	Czech Republic	3:0	(11:6, 11:7, 11:5)
07.08.2011	Switzerland	–	Czech Republic	3:0	(11:5, 11:6, 11:3)
07.08.2011	Switzerland	–	Chile	3:0	(11:4, 12:10, 11:8)

==== Qualifying Playoff ====
Preliminary round runners-up of each group played off to qualify for Group E in the second round. The runners-up of Group A and B played off in one match, while the runners-up of Group C and D played off in the other. The winners qualified for Group E in the second round, while the losers were placed into Group F.

Game Results
08.08.2011	Argentina	–	Namibia	3:0	(13:11, 11:8, 11:6)
08.08.2011	Italy	–	Chile	0:3	(8:11, 7:11, 6:11)

=== Second round ===
The games of the second round took place in Kremsmünster and Linz.

==== Group E ====
Group Table
Rank	Team	Sp.	Sets	Scores	Points
1	Austria	5	13:6	195:163	8
2	Brazil	5	14:10	240:214	8
3	Germany	5	10:7	170:159	6
4	Argentina	5	9:10	168:186	4
5	Switzerland	5	9:9	178:165	4
6	Chile	5	2:12	205:175	0

Game Results
08.08.2011	Brazil	–	Argentina	3:2	(11:7, 7:11, 7:11, 11:6, 12:10)
08.08.2011	Germany	–	Chile	3:0	(11:7, 11:5, 15:13)
08.08.2011	Austria	–	Brazil	3:2	(10:12, 9:11, 11:8, 11:9, 11:6)
09.08.2011	Germany	–	Switzerland	0:3	(4:11, 8:11, 6:11)
09.08.2011	Germany	–	Argentina	3:0	(11:5, 11:7, 11:4)
09.08.2011	Austria	–	Chile	3:0	(11:9, 11:7, 11:8)
09.08.2011	Brazil	–	Germany	3:1	(11:9, 12:14, 11:7, 11:5)
09.08.2011	Austria	–	Switzerland	3:0	(12:10, 11:7, 11:6)
10.08.2011	Brazil	–	Chile	3:2	(11:1, 11:6, 10:12, 10:12, 11:4)
10.08.2011	Switzerland	–	Argentina	1:3	(11:5, 10:12, 13:15, 7:11)
10.08.2011	Chile	–	Argentina	0:3	(5:11, 8:11, 11:13)
10.08.2011	Austria	–	Germany	1:3	(8:11, 11:9, 8:11, 8:11)
10.08.2011	Brazil	–	Switzerland	3:2	(8:11, 11:8, 7:11, 11:8, 11:9)

==== Group F ====
Group Table
Rank	Team	Sp.	Sets	Scores	Points
1	Namibia	5	15:1	163:97	10
2	Italy	5	13:5	185:140	8
3	Serbia	5	9:11	175:195	6
4	United States	5	10:11	198:191	4
5	Czech Republic	5	6:12	138:181	2
6	Japan	5	2:15	132:193	0

Game Results
08.08.2011	USA	–	Serbia	2:3	(9:11, 11:8, 11:13, 11:6, 10:12)
08.08.2011	Japan	–	Czech Republic	0:3	(9:11, 11:13, 6:11)
08.08.2011	USA	–	Namibia	0:3	(3:11, 5:11, 6:11)
08.08.2011	Czech Republic	–	Italy	0:3	(2:11, 5:11, 9:11)
09.08.2011	Serbia	–	Czech Republic	3:1	(11:5, 13:11, 3:11, 11:8)
09.08.2011	Japan	–	Namibia	0:3	(7:11, 2:11, 9:11)
09.08.2011	USA	–	Czech Republic	3:2	(11:5, 9:11, 11:4, 9:11, 11:7)
09.08.2011	USA	–	Italy	2:3	(11:3, 9:11, 12:10, 5:11, 11:13)
10.08.2011	USA	–	Japan	3:0	(11:7, 11:6, 11:9)
10.08.2011	Serbia	–	Italy	0:3	(6:11, 2:11, 6:11)
10.08.2011	Czech Republic	–	Namibia	0:3	(5:11, 3:11, 5:11)
10.08.2011	Serbia	–	Japan	3:2	(11:6 9:11 14:15 11:2 11:8)
10.08.2011	Italy	–	Namibia	1:3	(11:6, 10:12, 8:11, 6:11)

=== Quarterfinals ===
The quarterfinals were held in Linz.

Game Results
11.08.2011	Argentina	–	Switzerland	3:2	(12:10, 7:11, 11:8, 11:13, 12:10)
11.08.2011	Germany	–	Chile	3:1	(8:11, 11:2, 11:2, 11:6)
11.08.2011	Brazil	–	Namibia	3:0	(11:4, 11:4, 11:5)
11.08.2011	Austria	–	Italy	3:0	(11:9, 11:7, 14:12)

=== Qualifying Finals ===
The Qualifying Finals were held in Pasching and Linz.

Game Results
12.08.2011	Serbia	–	Japan	3:1	(11:7, 5:11, 11:8, 11:8)
12.08.2011	USA	–	Czech Republic	3:0	(14:12, 11:3, 11:5)
12.08.2011	Switzerland	–	Italy	3:0	(11:2, 11:4, 11:4)
12.08.2011	Chile	–	Namibia	3:0	(11:8, 11:8, 11:7)

=== Semifinals ===
The semifinals were held in Pasching.

The winners of each Semifinal moved into the Final, while the losers played off for third place.

Game Results
12.08.2011	Argentina	–	Austria	3:4	(2: 11, 5:11, 11:9, 12:10, 6:11, 12:10, 5:11)
12.08.2011	Germany	–	Brazil	4:1	(11:5, 11:5, 11:4, 8:11, 11:6)

=== Classification matches ===
The Classification Matches were held at the Waldstadion in Pasching.

Game Results
13.08.2011 (11th/12th Placing)	Japan	–	Czech Republic	0:3	(9:11, 2:11, 7:11)
13.08.2011 (9th/10th Placing)	Serbia	–	USA	0:3	(8:11, 4:11, 9:11)
13.08.2011 (7th/8th Placing)	Italy	–	Namibia	3:0	(11:2, 11:5, 11:7)
13.08.2011 (5th/6th Placing)	Switzerland	–	Chile	3:0	(12:10, 11:7, 11:5)

=== Third-place final ===
Game Results
13.08.2011	Argentina	–	Brazil	0:4	(7:11, 10:12, 8:11, 7:11)

=== Final ===
Game Results
13.08.2011	Austria	–	Germany	2:4	(7:11, 11:9, 12:14, 11:6, 7:11, 6:11)

== Final Placings ==
Rank	Team
1.	Germany
2.	Austria
3.	Brazil
4.	Argentina
5.	Switzerland
6.	Chile
7.	Italy
8.	Namibia
9.	United States
10.	Serbia
11.	Czech Republic
12.	Japan
