= 1994 Women's Fistball World Championships =

The 1994 Women's World Fistball Championships was held from the 7th to 9 of September 1994 in Buenos Aires, Argentina. Is the first Women's Fistball World Championship.

== Final standings ==
| Rank | Team |
|---|---|
| 1st place, gold medalist(s) | Germany |
| 2nd place, silver medalist(s) | Austria |
| 3rd place, bronze medalist(s) | Brazil |
| 4th | Switzerland |
| 5th | Argentina |
| 6th | Chile |
| 7th | Czech Republic |
| 8th | Uruguay |
