= Fistball at the 2013 World Games =

The fistball competition at the 2013 World Games was held from August 1 to August 4, at the Comfenalco Valle de Lili in Cali. Colombia.

== Schedule ==
July	25	26	27	28	29	30	31	1	2	3	4	Gold medals
Fistball											1	1

== Medal table ==
Rank	Nation	Gold	Silver	Bronze	Total
1	Germany (GER)	1	0	0	1
2	Switzerland (SUI)	0	1	0	1
3	Austria (AUT)	0	0	1	1
Totals (3 entries)		1	1	1	3

== Results ==
=== Preliminaries ===
Pos.	Team	SW
1	Switzerland	14
2	Germany	12
3	Brazil	11
4	Austria	10
5	Argentina	8
6	Chile	1

Hour	Game		
1st Rotation - Aug 1
10:15	Germany	3 - 0	Chile
11:30	Austria	3 - 2	Switzerland
12:45	Brazil	3 - 1	Argentina
2nd Rotation - Aug 1
14:00	Germany	3 - 1	Austria
15:15	Chile	0 - 3	Brazil
17:15	Switzerland	3 - 1	Argentina
3rd Rotation - Aug 2
10:15	Brazil	0 - 3	Germany
11:30	Chile	1 - 3	Switzerland
12:45	Argentina	0 - 3	Austria

Hour	Game		
4th Rotation - Aug 2
14:00	Germany	1 - 3	Switzerland
15:15	Argentina	3 - 0	Chile
16:30	Austria	0 - 3	Brazil
5th Rotation - Aug 3
10:15	Switzerland	3 - 2	Brazil
11:30	Chile	0 - 3	Austria
12:45	Argentina	3 - 2	Germany

=== Second phase ===
Hour	Game			
Aug 3
14:30	Semifinal	Switzerland	3 -0	Austria
16:45	Semifinal	Germany	3 - 1	Brazil
Aug 4
10:15	Place 5	Argentina	2 - 3	Chile
11:30	Bronze medal Match	Austria	4 - 3	Brazil
13:30	Final	Switzerland	1 - 4	Germany

== Rankings ==
Rank	Team
Gold medal	Germany
Silver medal	Switzerland
Bronze medal	Austria
4.	Brazil
5.	Chile
6.	Argentina
