= 2010 World Cup (disambiguation) =

The 2010 World Cup was the 19th edition of the FIFA international association football tournament.

2010 World Cup may also refer to:

== Association football ==
- 2010 FIFA U-20 Women's World Cup
- 2010 FIFA U-17 Women's World Cup
- 2010 FIFA Club World Cup

== Cricket ==
- 2010 U-19 Cricket World Cup, in cricket (One Day International)

== Alpine skiing ==
- 2010 Alpine Skiing World Cup

== Athletics ==
- 2010 IAAF Continental Cup, in athletics

== Hockey ==
- 2010 Men's Hockey World Cup
- 2010 Women's Hockey World Cup

== Rugby ==
=== Rugby union ===
- 2010 Women's Rugby World Cup, in rugby union

== Motor sports ==
- 2010 Speedway World Cup

== Video games ==
- 2010 FIFA World Cup South Africa (video game), official video game of the 2010 FIFA World Cup

== See also ==
- 2010 World Championships (disambiguation)
- 2010 World Junior Championships (disambiguation)
- 2010 Continental Championships (disambiguation)
