= 2014 Men's Asia-Pacific Fistball Championships =

2014 Asia-Pacific Fistball Championships
Tournament details
- Host country: Pakistan
- Dates: 10–11 April 2014
- Teams: 4
- Venue: 1 (in 1 host city)

Final positions
- Champions: Pakistan
- Runners-up: India
- Third place: Nepal
- Fourth place: Australia

Tournament statistics
- Matches played: 6

The 1st Men's Asia-Pacific Fistball Championships (subsequently renamed Asia-Pacific Men's Fistball Championship) was held from 10 to 11 April 2014 at University of Lahore in Lahore, Punjab in Pakistan. It was the first major international fistball tournament to be held in the Asian region.

Pakistan were crowned Asian Fistball Champions for the first time, defeating India 3:2 in the final.

== Participants ==
The 4 teams that competed in the 2014 Men's Asian Fistball Championships in Pakistan were:

3 from Asia	India	Nepal	Pakistan
1 from Oceania	Australia

== Structure ==
All matches of the 2014 Asia-Pacific Fistball Championships were played to three winning sets (best of five sets).

=== Round Robin Stage ===
- In the round robin stage the 4 competing teams played off against each other to determine rankings for the Finals.
- The last two round robin stage matches were not played due to being 'dead rubbers' as ranking positions were already decided.

=== Finals ===
- The teams ranked #1 and #2 played off in the Final
- The teams ranked #3 and #4 played off in the bronze-medal match

== Schedule and results ==
=== Round Robin Stage ===
Rank	Team	Matches	Sets	Scores	Points
1	India	2:0	6:1	81:59	4
2	Pakistan	2:0	6:2	88:70	4
3	Australia	0:2	3:6	83:99	0
4	Nepal	0:2	0:6	46:70	0

10 April 2014	India	–	Australia	3:1	(11:4, 8:11, 15:14, 14:12)
10 April 2014	Pakistan	–	Nepal	3:0	(11:6, 15:13, 11:9)
10 April 2014	India	–	Nepal	3:0	(11:4, 11:7, 11:7)
10 April 2014	Pakistan	–	Australia	3:2	(8:11, 11:7, 11:6, 10:12, 11:6)
10 April 2014	Pakistan	–	India	0:0	(No Result - Match not played due to being a 'dead rubber')
10 April 2014	Nepal	–	Australia	0:0	(No Result - Match not played due to being a 'dead rubber')

=== Bronze-medal match (3rd/4th Placing) ===
11 April 2014	Nepal	–	Australia	3:1	(8:11, 13:11, 11:9, 11–9)

=== Final ===
11 April 2014	Pakistan	–	India	3:2	(11:7, 11:8, 9:11, 8:11, 11:7)

== Final standings ==
Rank	Country
1	Pakistan
2	India
3	Nepal
4	Australia
