= Fistball European Championships =

Fistball championship in Europe

Fistball European Championships are a competition which has been organized by the International Fistball Association (IFA) since 1965 for men and since 1993 for women.

== Events ==
- European Fistball Association (EFA) https://de.wikipedia.org/wiki/European_Fistball_Association

=== Nationalmannschaften ===
- Faustball-Europameisterschaften der Männer
- Faustball-Europameisterschaften der Frauen
- Faustball-Europameisterschaften der männlichen U21
- Faustball-Europameisterschaften der männlichen U18
- Faustball-Europameisterschaften der weiblichen U18

=== Vereinsmannschaften ===
- EFA Champions Cup der Männer (Feld)
- EFA Champions Cup der Frauen (Feld)
- EFA European Cup der Männer (Feld)
- EFA Champions Cup der Männer (Halle) – EFA Men‘s Champions Cup Indoor
- EFA Champions Cup der Frauen (Halle) – EFA Women‘s Champions Cup Indoor

== Medals ==
See: Results

1. Men Senior (1965-2024) - 23 Editions
2. Women Senior (1993-2023) - 18 Editions
3. Men Junior (1995-2024) - 15 Editions
4. Women Junior (2001-2024) - 14 Editions
5. Men U21 (1994-2023) - 23 Editions
6. Women U21 (-) - 0 Editions

Rank	Nation	Gold	Silver	Bronze	Total
1	Germany	62	25	8	95
2	Austria	18	39	35	92
3	Switzerland	13	29	49	91
4	Italy	0	0	1	1
Totals (4 entries)		93	93	93	279

- Germany include west and east medals.

== European Championships - Men ==
Year	Host	Gold	Silver	Bronze
1965	Linz, Austria	West Germany	Austria	East Germany
1970	Olten, Switzerland	West Germany	East Germany	Austria
1974	Linz, Austria	West Germany	Switzerland	Austria
1978	Offenburg, Germany	West Germany	Switzerland	Austria
1981	Perg, Austria	West Germany	Switzerland	Austria
1984	Binningen, Switzerland	Austria	West Germany	Switzerland
1988	Zwettl, Austria	West Germany	Austria	Switzerland
1991	Olten, Switzerland	Germany	Austria	Switzerland
1994	Walldürn, Germany	Germany	Switzerland	Austria
1996	Linz, Austria	Germany	Switzerland	Austria
1998	Oldenburg, Germany	Germany	Austria	Switzerland
2000	Freistadt, Austria	Germany	Austria	Switzerland
2002	Erlangen, Germany	Austria	Germany	Switzerland
2004	Neuendorf, Switzerland	Austria	Germany	Switzerland
2006	Linz, Austria	Switzerland	Austria	Germany
2008	Stuttgart, Germany	Austria	Switzerland	Germany
2010	Ermatingen, Switzerland	Austria	Switzerland	Germany
2012	Schweinfurt, Germany	Switzerland	Austria	Germany
2014	Olten, Switzerland	Germany	Switzerland	Austria
2016	Grieskirchen, Austria	Germany	Switzerland	Austria
2018	Adelmannsfelden, Germany	Germany	Switzerland	Austria
2022	Kaltern, Italy	Germany	Austria	Switzerland

== European Championships - Women ==
Year	Host	Gold	Silver	Bronze
1993	St. Florian, Austria	Germany	Austria	Switzerland
1996	Štěchovice, Czech Republic	Germany	Switzerland	Austria
1999	Alzenau, Germany	Germany	Switzerland	Austria
2000	Schaffhausen, Switzerland	Switzerland	Germany	Austria
2001	Wigoltingen, Switzerland	Germany	Switzerland	Austria
2003	Arnreit, Austria	Germany	Austria	Switzerland
2004	Seebergen, Germany	Switzerland	Germany	Austria
2005	Rohrbach, Austria	Germany	Switzerland	Austria
2007	Salzburg, Austria	Germany	Switzerland	Austria
2008	Rohrbach, Austria	Germany	Switzerland	Austria
2009	Zofingen, Switzerland	Switzerland	Austria	Germany
2011	Ludwigshafen-Oppau, Germany	Austria	Germany	Switzerland
2012	Diepoldsau, Switzerland	Austria	Germany	Switzerland
2013	Bohdaneč, Czech Republic	Austria	Germany	Switzerland
2015	Bolzano, Italy	Germany	Austria	Switzerland
2017	Calw, Germany	Germany	Austria	Switzerland
2019	Lázně Bohdaneč, Czech Republic	Germany	Austria	Switzerland

== U18 Men ==
Since 1995.

== U18 Women ==
Since 2001.

== U21 Men ==
Since 1994.

== U21 Women ==
Not yet.
