= 2008 European Men's Fistball Championship =

- 16th European Fistball Championships: Germany 2008 -
Host	Stuttgart (Germany)
Dates	July 25 - July 27
Teams	7 national teams
- Final rankings
Champions	Austria
Runners-up	Switzerland
Third place	Germany
Fourth place	Italy
- Tournament statistics
Matches	17

The 2008 European Men's Fistball Championship was held in Stuttgart (Germany) from July 25 to July 27 with seven men's national teams: Austria, Catalonia, Czech Republic, Germany, Italy, Serbia and Switzerland. The matches were played in Stammheim district.

== Teams ==
Group A

Germany
Kolja Meyer
Willm Engelke
Jan Hoffrichter
Olaf Machelett
Sascha Ball
Michael Marx
Christian Kläner
Stefan Konprecht

Austria
Dietmar Weiß
Christian Koller
Christian Zöttl
Georg Kerbl
Robert Tapler
Klemens Kronsteiner
Harald Pühringer
Siegfried Simon

Italy
Florian Rottensteiner
Thomas Meran
Tobias Prudenziati
Lukas Tovazzi
Christian Scartezzini
Fabian Obexer
Armin Runer
Simon Prdudenziati

Switzerland
Cyrill Schreiber
Cyrill Jäger
Dominik Guggerli
Manuel Sieber
Marc Hüttig
Lukas Lässer
Marcel Eicher
Ueli Frischknecht

Group B

Czech Republic
Michal Krajicek
Petr Kuna
Vladislav Merunko
Jan Mazal jr.
Jan Forst
Daniel Mazal

Catalonia
Luis González
Daniel Sarrión
Oscar Suárez
Javier García
Aitor Piñol
Javier Estévez
Jordi Matador
Jordi Cantó

Serbia
Vojislav Skoric
Ivan Milenkovic
Milan Kavaric
Zoran Jovancovic
Sasa Jovic
Dusan Zezelj
Marko Stojanovic
Mirko Neskovic
Nenad Kovacevic
Milos Milurovic
Zuca Pantovic
Nikola Biberovic

== First round ==
=== Group A ===
GROUP A	Pts	P	W	L	S+	S-	DS
Austria	6	3	3	0	9	3	+6
Switzerland	4	3	2	1	7	4	+3
Germany	2	3	1	2	5	7	-2
Italy	0	3	0	3	2	9	-7

July 25 - 11:00
July 25 - 11:00	Switzerland	3-1	Italy	Stammheim; Stuttgart
July 25 - 11:00	11-3, 11-9, 8-11, 11-4			Stammheim; Stuttgart

July 25 - 14:00
July 25 - 14:00	Switzerland	3-0	Germany	Stammheim; Stuttgart
July 25 - 14:00	11-7, 11-2, 11-9			Stammheim; Stuttgart

July 25 - 15:00
July 25 - 15:00	Austria	3-0	Italy	Stammheim; Stuttgart
July 25 - 15:00	11-6, 11-5, 11-5			Stammheim; Stuttgart

July 25 - 18:30
July 25 - 18:30	Austria	3-2	Germany	Stammheim; Stuttgart
July 25 - 18:30	12-14, 12-10, 3-11, 12-10, 11-7			Stammheim; Stuttgart

July 26 - 11:00
July 26 - 11:00	Germany	3-1	Italy	Stammheim; Stuttgart
July 26 - 11:00	11-5, 10-12, 12-10, 11-8			Stammheim; Stuttgart

July 26 - 13:00
July 26 - 13:00	Switzerland	1-3	Austria	Stammheim; Stuttgart
July 26 - 13:00	8-11, 7-11, 11-7, 5-11			Stammheim; Stuttgart

=== Group B ===
GROUP B	Pts	P	W	L	S+	S-	DS
Serbia	4	4	2	0	6	1	+5
(Czech Republic) Czech Rep.	2	2	1	1	3	3	=
Catalonia	0	2	0	2	1	6	-5

July 25 - 12:00
July 25 - 12:00	Serbia	3-0	Czech Republic	Stammheim; Stuttgart
July 25 - 12:00	11-2, 11-7, 11-6			Stammheim; Stuttgart

July 25 - 16:00
July 25 - 16:00	Serbia	3-1	Catalonia	Stammheim; Stuttgart
July 25 - 16:00	11-4, 13-15, 11-2, 11-6			Stammheim; Stuttgart

July 26 - 12:00
July 26 - 12:00	Catalonia	0-3	Czech Republic	Stammheim; Stuttgart
July 26 - 12:00	6-11, 6-11, 9-11			Stammheim; Stuttgart

== Semifinals classification ==
Match classification 4th group A - 1st group B

July 26 - 15:00
July 26 - 15:00	Italy	3-1	Serbia	Stammheim; Stuttgart
July 26 - 15:00	8:11, 11-4, 11-6, 11-7			Stammheim; Stuttgart

== 5th-7th places ==
5th-7th places	Pts	P	W	L	S+	S-	DS
Serbia	4	2	2	0	6	1	+5
(Czech Republic) Czech Rep.	2	1	0	1	4	6	+1
Catalonia	0	2	0	2	0	6	-6

July 27 - 9:30
July 27 - 9:30	Serbia	3-0	Catalonia	Stammheim; Stuttgart
July 27 - 9:30	11-8, 11-6, 11-9			Stammheim; Stuttgart

July 27 - 11:00
July 27 - 11:00	Czech Republic	3-0	Catalonia	Stammheim; Stuttgart
July 27 - 11:00	11-9, 11-8, 11-7			Stammheim; Stuttgart

July 27 - 12:30
July 27 - 12:30	Serbia	3-1	Czech Republic	Stammheim; Stuttgart
July 27 - 12:30	11-5, 5-11, 11-6, 11-9			Stammheim; Stuttgart

== Final round ==
Semi-finals
July 26 - Stuttgart
Switzerland	4
Germany	0
July 26 - Stuttgart
Austria	4
Italy	0

Final
July 27 - Stuttgart
Switzerland	2
(Austria) AUSTRIA	4
Third place
July 27 - Stuttgart
Germany	4
Italy	0

=== Semifinals ===
July 26 - 16:30
July 26 - 16:30	Switzerland	4-0	Germany	Stammheim; Stuttgart
July 26 - 16:30	11-6, 11-9, 11-9, 11-5			Stammheim; Stuttgart

July 26 - 17:30
July 26 - 17:30	Austria	4-0	Italy	Stammheim; Stuttgart
July 26 - 17:30	11-9, 11-6, 11-5, 11-9			Stammheim; Stuttgart

=== Finals ===
3rd-4th places

July 27 - 14:00
July 27 - 14:00	Germany	4-0	Italy	Stammheim; Stuttgart
July 27 - 14:00	11-1, 11-3, 11-5, 11-6			Stammheim; Stuttgart

Final

July 27 - 16:00
July 27 - 16:00	Switzerland	2-4	Austria	Stammheim; Stuttgart
July 27 - 16:00	9-11, 7-11, 12-10, 11-9, 8-11, 3-11			Stammheim; Stuttgart

Winners
AUSTRIA

== Final standings ==
Final standings
1	Austria
2	Switzerland
3	Germany
4	Italy
5	Serbia
6	(Czech Republic) Czech Rep.
7	Catalonia
