= International Fistball Association =

Sport governing body

- IFA Official Logo
- Abbreviation: IFA
- Formation: 25 July 1960; 66 years ago
- Type: Sports organisation
- Headquarters: Salzburg, Austria
- Region served: Worldwide
- Members: 67 member associations (2025)
- Official language: German, English, French, Italian
- President: Jörn Verleger
- General secretary: Christoph Oberlehner
- Main organ: IFA Congress
- Website: ifa.fistball.sport

The International Fistball Association is the umbrella organization of all national fistball organizations worldwide. It is member of the Alliance of Independent Recognized Members of Sport, stakeholder of SportAccord. It is also a member of The Association for International Sport for All.

== History ==
- 1965: Men Senior events was started.
- 1993: Women Senior events was started.
- 1995: Men Junior events was started.
- 2001: Women Junior events was started.

== Governance and organisation ==
The International Fistball Association is governed by the IFA Congress, its highest decision-making body. The Congress meets every four years in conjunction with a major international fistball event and includes representatives of member federations, the Board of Directors and honorary members with voting rights. Each participating member federation is entitled to two votes. The Congress determines the association's strategic direction and elects its Board of Directors.

The IFA Board of Directors oversees the organisation's activities and international development. Its work is supported by specialised commissions covering areas such as sport, refereeing, youth participation, communications and women in sport. The IFA Office is responsible for administrative coordination, event management and anti-doping activities.

On 1 September 2025, Brazilian sports administrator Gastão Englert succeeded Jörn Verleger as president of the IFA. Englert, previously the association's first vice-president, became the first Brazilian to lead the international governing body. His presidency is scheduled to continue until the association's regular Congress in 2027.

== Development and education programmes ==
The International Fistball Association operates educational and development initiatives intended to support the growth of fistball internationally. Its IFA Fistball Academy provides training materials and learning resources for teachers, coaches and national federations, particularly in countries where the sport is still developing. The academy's educational modules cover the rules, techniques and fundamental principles of fistball, using written explanations, illustrations, presentations and video materials.

The association also promotes knowledge-sharing between national and continental federations as part of its sustainability strategy. Its educational activities are intended to support players, referees, coaches and event organisers, with resources ranging from introductory instruction for schools to more advanced training for sporting organisations.

== Events ==
- Fistball World Championships - 1968 for Men / 1994 for Women / 2003 for Boys / 2006 for Girls
- Fistball at the World Games - Since 1985
- Fistball European Championships - 1965 for Men / 1993 for Women
- Asia-Pacific Fistball Championships - 2014 for Men / 2018 for Women
- IFA Fistball World Tour Since 2017 - IFA Fistball World Tour Finals
- African Championship
- American Championship
- Faustball-Weltpokal

== National teams ==
- Deutsche Faustballnationalmannschaft der Männer
- Deutsche Faustballnationalmannschaft der Frauen

== Confederations ==
1. Asia-Pacific Fistball Association (APFC)
2. European Fistball Association (EFA)
3. Pan American Fistball Association (PAFA)

=== Nationalmannschaften ===
- Faustball-Europameisterschaften der Männer
- Faustball-Europameisterschaften der Frauen
- Faustball-Europameisterschaften der männlichen U21
- Faustball-Europameisterschaften der männlichen U18
- Faustball-Europameisterschaften der weiblichen U18

=== Vereinsmannschaften ===
- EFA Champions Cup der Männer (Feld)
- EFA Champions Cup der Frauen (Feld)
- EFA European Cup der Männer (Feld)
- EFA Champions Cup der Männer (Halle) – EFA Men‘s Champions Cup Indoor
- EFA Champions Cup der Frauen (Halle) – EFA Women‘s Champions Cup Indoor

== Members ==
These are currently the members of the International Fistball Association:

=== Members by Regions ===
As of 1 March 2025

Number	Region	Countries
1	Africa	14
2	Asia	13
3	Oceania	5
4	Europe	23
5	Americas	12
Total	World	67

==== Asia ====
1. Afghanistan
2. People’s Republic of China
3. Hong Kong, China
4. India
5. Islamic Republic of Iran
6. Japan
7. Kuwait
8. Mongolia
9. Nepal
10. Pakistan
11. Republic of Korea
12. Sri Lanka
13. Chinese Taipei

==== Oceania ====
1. Australia
2. Fiji
3. New Zealand
4. Cook Island
5. Samoa

==== Africa ====
1. Benin
2. Burkina Faso
3. Cameroon
4. Central African Republic
5. Côte d'Ivoire
6. Kenya
7. Morocco
8. Namibia
9. Nigeria
10. Sierra Leone
11. South Africa
12. Swaziland
13. Togo
14. Uganda

==== America ====
1. Argentina
2. Bolivia
3. Brazil
4. Canada
5. Chile
6. Colombia
7. Dominican Republic
8. Haiti
9. Trinidad and Tobago
10. United States of America
11. Uruguay
12. Venezuela

==== Europe ====
1. Albania
2. Austria
3. Belgium
4. Cyprus
5. Czech Republic
6. Denmark
7. Germany
8. Great Britain
9. Greece
10. Hungary
11. Iceland
12. Italy
13. Malta
14. Netherlands
15. North Macedonia
16. Poland
17. Portugal
18. Russian Federation
19. Serbia
20. Spain
21. Sweden
22. Switzerland
23. Ukraine

== List Of Member ==
Country	Member
AFG	Fistball Afghanistan
Albania	Fistball Albania
Argentina	Federacion Argentina de Faustball
Australia	Fistball Federation of Australia
Austria	Österreichischer Faustball Bund
Bangladesh	Bangladesh Fistball Federation
Belgium	Belgian Fistball Association
Benin	Beninese Federation of Fistball
Brazil	Confederação Brasileira de Desportes Terrestres
Cameroon	Cameroon Association Fistball
Canada	Fistball Federation Canada
Central African Republic	Central African Republic Association Fistball
Chile	Federación Chilena de Faustball
Chinese Taipei	Chinese Taipei Fistball Association Taiwan
Colombia	Federacion Colombiana de Fistball
Cote D'Ivoire	Federation Ivoirienne de Fistball
Croatia	Fistball Croatia
Cyprus	Fistball Cyprus
Czech Republic	Czech Fistball Association
Denmark	Fistball Denmark
Dominican Republic	Domanican Fistball Federation
Germany	Deutsche Faustball-Liga
Great Britain	Fistball United Kingdom
Greece	Fistball Greece
Hong Kong	Fistball Association of Hong Kong China
Hungary	Fistball Hungary
Iceland	Fistball Iceland
India	Fistball Federation of India
IRI	Fistball Iran
Italy	Federazione Italiana Faustball
Japan	Japan Fistball Association
Kenya	Fistball Kenya
Kuwait	Fistball Kuwait
Lithuania	Fistball Lithuania
Malaysia	Fistball Malaysia
Malta	Fistball Malta
Mongolia	Fistball Mongolia
Namibia	Fistball Association of Namibia
Nepal	Everest Fistball Club Nepal
Netherlands	Nederlandse Vuistbal Bond
New Zealand	New Zealand Fistball Association
Nigeria	Fistball Association of Nigeria
Pakistan	Pakistan Fistball Federation
China	Fistball China
Poland	Fistball Poland
Serbia	Fistball Savez Srbije
Sierra Leone	Sierra Leone Fistball Association
Slovenia	Fistball Slovenia
South Africa	Fistball Association of South Africa
Spain	Fistball Spain
Sri Lanka	Fistball Association of Sri Lanka
Eswatini	Eswatini Fistball Federation
Sweden	Svenska fistbollsförbundet
Switzerland	Swiss Faustball
Thailand	Fistball Thailand
Togo	Association Fistball Togo
Trinidad & Tobago	Fistball Association of Trinidad & Tobago
Ukraine	Fistball Ukraine
USA	United States Fistball Association
Uruguay	Federacion Uruguaya de Faustball
Venezuela	Fistball Venezuela
