= 2019 Men's Fistball World Championships =

International men's fistball tournament held in 2019

Tournament details
- Host country: Switzerland
- Dates: 11–17 August 2019
- Teams: 18
- Venue: 1 (in 1 host city)

Final positions
- Champions: Germany
- Runners-up: Austria
- Third place: Brazil
- Fourth place: Switzerland

Tournament statistics
- Matches played: 72

The 15th Men's World Fistball Championships was held from the 11th to 17th August 2019 at Stadion Schützenwiese in Winterthur, Canton of Zürich in Switzerland. It was the third time the Men's Fistball World Championships have been held in Switzerland, having also previously been held in St. Gallen in 1979 and Olten in 1999.

Defending champions Germany became World Champions for a third consecutive time, defeating Austria 4:0 in the final and in the process claimed their record 12th Men's Fistball World Championship.

== Participants ==
A record 18 teams took part in the competition, an increase on the 14 teams that competed at the previous World Championships in 2015.

There were 11 returning teams from the 2015 Men's World Championships in Argentina. They were joined by Serbia and Japan, who returned to the competition having not taken part in 2015 and Denmark having not competed at a World Championships since 2007.

There were four nations that competed at the World Championships for the first time; New Zealand, becoming the second team to represent from the Oceania region, after Australia in 2015. Also competing for the first time were Belgium, Netherlands and Poland, taking the number of teams from the European region to a record 10.

Colombia, Pakistan and South Africa were the three teams that didn't return from 2015, as well as India who were a late withdrawal from the 2015 tournament.

The 18 teams competed in the 2019 Men's Fistball World Championships in Switzerland were:

10 from Europe	Germany	Switzerland	Austria
including hosts:	Italy	Czech Republic	Serbia
	Denmark	Netherlands	Poland
	Belgium
3 from South America	Brazil	Chile	Argentina
1 from Asia	Japan
1 from Africa	Namibia
1 from North America	United States
2 from Oceania	Australia	New Zealand

== Structure ==
The tournament is structured as follows.

All matches of the World Championships were played to three winning sets (best of five sets) except for the Third Place Playoff and Final; which were played to four winning sets (best of seven sets).

=== Group Stage ===
- In the group stage the 18 competing teams were divided up into four groups. Groups A and B contained four teams each, consisting of the top eight ranked teams from 2015 Men's Fistball World Championships. Groups C and D contained five teams each, comprising the remaining ten teams.
- All teams in groups A and B automatically progressed to the 'Double Elimination Stage', with teams playing off to determine rankings.
- The top two teams from groups C and D progressed to the 'Double Elimination Stage', while the remaining teams were relegated to play off for the 'President's Cup'

=== Double Elimination and President's Cup ===
==== Double Elimination ====
- The eight teams from groups A and B as well as the top two ranked teams from groups C and D played off in a double elimination format bracket to qualify for the Quarter Finals and to determine rankings for the 9th to 12th position Placement Matches.
- The winning teams of the two Quarter Finals advanced straight to the Semi Finals.
- The losing teams of the two Quarter Finals moved back into the Double Elimination Bracket to playoff for the remaining two Semi Final positions.

==== President's Cup ====
- The remaining teams from groups C and D were combined into one group, retaining the points they had gained from their earlier group matches against the teams left in the President's Cup.
- Teams played against the three teams from the opposite group to determine final rankings within the combined group.
- The top two ranked teams played off for the President's Cup (13th/14th place)
- The Remaining teams played off to determine placings 15th to 18th.

=== Placement matches and finals ===
- The winners of the Semi Finals played off in the Final
- The losers of the Semi Finals played off in the Bronze Medal Match
- All other teams played off in Placements Matches to determine placings from 5th to 12th.

== Schedule and results ==
The results were as follows:

=== Group Stage ===
==== Group A ====
Group Table
Rank	Team	Matches	Sets	Scores	Points
1	Germany	3:0	9:1	104:55	6
2	Austria	2:1	7:3	97:57	4
3	Italy	1:2	3:7	56:97	2
4	Argentina	0:3	1:9	59:107	0

Game Results
11.08.2019	Austria	–	Italy	3:0	(11:1, 11:3, 11:0)
11.08.2019	Germany	–	Argentina	3:0	(11:3, 11:5, 11:5)
12.08.2019	Austria	–	Argentina	3:0	(11:9, 11:3, 11:3)
12.08.2019	Germany	–	Italy	3:0	(11:1, 11:4, 11:6)
13.08.2019	Argentina	–	Italy	1:3	(6:11, 11:8, 5:11, 9:11)
13.08.2019	Germany	–	Austria	3:1	(11:9, 5:11, 11:7, 11:4)

==== Group B ====
Group Table
Rank	Team	Matches	Sets	Scores	Points
1	Switzerland	3:0	9:1	112:82	6
2	Brazil	2:1	7:4	115:91	4
3	Chile	1:2	4:7	95:104	2
4	United States	0:3	1:9	64:108	0

Game Results
11.08.2019	Brazil	–	USA	3:0	(11:6, 11:4, 11:6)
11.08.2019	Switzerland	–	Chile	3:0	(11:7, 11:8, 11:9)
12.08.2019	Brazil	–	Chile	3:1	(11:4, 11:4, 5:11, 12:10)
12.08.2019	Switzerland	–	USA	3:0	(11:7, 11:5, 11:4)
13.08.2019	Chile	–	USA	3:1	(11:9, 9:11, 11:6, 11:6)
13.08.2019	Switzerland	–	Brazil	3:1	(7:11, 13:11, 11:6, 15:14)

==== Group C ====
Group Table
Rank	Team	Matches	Sets	Scores	Points
1	Czech Republic	4:0	12:2	149:93	8
2	New Zealand	3:1	9:6	147:135	6
3	Serbia	2:2	8:8	145:155	4
4	Poland	1:3	6:9	128:136	2
5	Belgium	0:4	2:12	104:154	0

Game Results
11.08.2019	Czech Republic	–	Poland	3:1	(8:11, 11:6, 11:8, 11:6)
11.08.2019	Serbia	–	Belgium	3:1	(15:14, 8:11, 11:5, 11:6)
11.08.2019	Serbia	–	New Zealand	2:3	(8:11, 11:8, 4:11, 13:11, 10:12)
11.08.2019	Czech Republic	–	Belgium	3:1	(11:4, 11:7, 9:11, 11:5)
12.08.2019	Serbia	–	Poland	3:1	(5:11, 11:6, 11:8, 11:8)
12.08.2019	Czech Republic	–	New Zealand	3:0	(11:3, 11:8, 11:8)
12.08.2019	Belgium	–	Poland	0:3	(5:11, 7:11, 4:11)
13.08.2019	Belgium	–	New Zealand	0:3	(8:11, 7:11, 10:12)
13.08.2019	Czech Republic	–	Serbia	3:0	(11:5, 11:7, 11:4)
13.08.2019	New Zealand	–	Poland	3:1	(11:5, 11:7, 8:11, 11:8)

==== Group D ====
Group Table
Rank	Team	Matches	Sets	Scores	Points
1	Namibia	4:0	12:0	132:42	8
2	Denmark	3:1	9:5	128:126	6
3	Netherlands	1:3	4:10	112:142	2
4	Australia	1:3	6:10	126:156	2
5	Japan	1:3	4:10	112:144	2

Game Results
11.08.2019	Namibia	–	Netherlands	3:0	(11:8, 11:2, 11:1)
11.08.2019	Australia	–	Denmark	2:3	(8:11, 11:8, 9:11, 13:11, 7:11)
11.08.2019	Namibia	–	Japan	3:0	(11:0, 11:5, 11:9)
12.08.2019	Namibia	–	Denmark	3:0	(11:4, 11:2, 11:4)
12.08.2019	Australia	–	Netherlands	1:3	(8:11, 7:11, 11:7, 5:11)
12.08.2019	Australia	–	Japan	3:1	(11:3, 11:7, 7:11, 11:8)
12.08.2019	Denmark	–	Netherlands	3:0	(11:8, 11:7, 11:8)
13.08.2019	Namibia	–	Australia	0:3	(11:2, 11:0, 11:5)
13.08.2019	Denmark	–	Japan	3:0	(11:6, 11:8, 11:8)
13.08.2019	Japan	–	Netherlands	3:1	(8:11, 11:7, 15:13, 11:7)

=== President's Cup (Group Stage) ===
Group Table
Rank	Team	Matches	Sets	Scores	Points
1	Poland	4:1	13:3	166:117	8
2	Serbia	4:1	14:6	192:144	8
3	Belgium	3:2	10:6	151:14	6
4	Australia	2:3	7:12	155:178	4
5	Netherlands	1:4	4:13	142:176	2
6	Japan	1:4	4:13	126:177	2

Game Results
14.08.2019	Netherlands	–	Belgium	0:3	(6:11, 9:11, 9:11)
14.08.2019	Poland	–	Australia	3:0	(11:9, 11:5, 11:8)
14.08.2019	Serbia	–	Japan	3:0	(11:8, 11:4, 11:1)
15.08.2019	Serbia	–	Australia	2:3	(7:11, 11:5, 11:5, 9:11, 5:11)
15.08.2019	Netherlands	–	Poland	0:3	(5:11, 10:12, 6:11)
15.08.2019	Belgium	–	Japan	3:0	(11:7, 11:7, 11:5)
15.08.2019	Poland	–	Japan	3:0	(11:7, 11:7, 11:6)
15.08.2019	Serbia	–	Netherlands	3:0	(11:8, 11:6, 11:5)
15.08.2019	Australia	–	Belgium	0:3	(7:11, 5:11, 7:11,)

=== Double Elimination & Quarter Finals ===
Game Results
14.08.2019	Chile	–	New Zealand	3:1	(11:8, 9:11, 13:11, 11:3)
14.08.2019	Argentina	–	Namibia	3:0	(11:6, 11:4, 11:8)
14.08.2019	USA	–	Czech Republic	3:1	(11:7, 11:5, 11:13, 11:7)
14.08.2019	Italy	–	Denmark	3:0	(11:4, 11:3, 11:6)
14.08.2019	Austria	–	Chile	3:2	(10:12, 11:9, 9:11, 11:6, 11:6)
14.08.2019	Switzerland	–	Argentina	3:0	(11:5, 11:9, 11:5)
14.08.2019	Brazil	–	Italy	3:0	(11:4, 11:7, 11:7)
14.08.2019	Germany	–	USA	3:0	(11:6, 11:4, 11:7)
15.08.2019	Czech Republic	–	Argentina	0:3	(5:11, 4:11, 1:11,)
15.08.2019	Denmark	–	Chile	1:3	(4:11, 11:9, 5:11, 6:11)
15.08.2019	Namibia	–	USA	3:1	(11:6, 5:11, 13:11, 15:13)
15.08.2019	New Zealand	–	Italy	0:3	(8:11, 8:11, 6:11)
15.08.2019	Argentina	–	Chile	0:3	(8:11, 7:11, 4:11)
15.08.2019	Namibia	–	Italy	0:3	(8:11, 13:15, 5:11)

Quarter Finals
15.08.2019	Brazil	–	Germany	0:3	(7:11, 9:11, 6:11)
15.08.2019	Austria	–	Switzerland	3:0	(11:9, 11:6, 13:11)

=== Double Elimination & Semi Finals ===
Game Results
16.08.2019	Switzerland	–	Italy	3:0	(11:9, 11:4, 11:3)
16.08.2019	USA	–	New Zealand	3:0	(11:7, 11:7, 11:9)
16.08.2019	Brazil	–	Chile	3:0	(11:3, 11:5, 11:4)
16.08.2019	Denmark	–	Czech Republic	0:3	(2:11, 5:11, 4:11)

Semi Finals
16.08.2019	Germany	–	Switzerland	3:0	(11:6, 15:14, 11:3)
16.08.2019	Austria	–	Brazil	3:2	(7:11, 11:7, 12:10, 5:11, 11:4)

=== Placement Matches 12th - 18th and President's Cup ===
Game Results
16.08.2019 (17th/18th Placing)	Japan	–	Netherlands	0:3	(9:11, 6:11, 6:11)
13.08.2011 (15th/16th Placing)	Belgium	–	Australia	3:2	(15:13, 13:11, 6:11, 8:11, 12:10)

President's Cup Final (13th/14th Placing)
16.08.2019	Serbia	–	Poland	3:0	(15:13, 11:5, 15:13)

=== Placement Matches 5th - 12th ===
Game Results
16.08.2019 (11th/12th Placing)	New Zealand	–	Denmark	3:0	(11:2, 11:7, 11:2)
17.08.2019 (9th/10th Placing)	USA	–	Czech Republic	2:3	(8:11, 11:8, 11:13, 11:1, 11:13)
17.08.2019 (7th/8th Placing)	Argentina	–	Namibia	3:0	(11:7, 11:6, 11:8)
17.08.2019 (5th/6th Placing)	Italy	–	Chile	3:1	(11:6, 4:11, 11:7, 11:9)

=== Bronze Medal Match (3rd/4th Placing) ===
Game Results
17.08.2019	Switzerland	–	Brazil	0:4	(8:11, 9:11, 8:11, 9:11)

=== Final ===
Game Results
17.08.2019	Germany	–	Austria	4:0	(11:4, 11:4, 11:9, 11:5)

== Final standings ==
These are the final standings:

Rank	Country
1	Germany
2	Austria
3	Brazil
4	Switzerland
5	Italy
6	Chile
7	Argentina
8	Namibia
9	Czech Republic
10	United States
11	New Zealand
12	Denmark
13	Serbia
14	Poland
15	Belgium
16	Australia
17	Netherlands
18	Japan
