= Asia-Pacific Fistball Championships =

International fistball championship

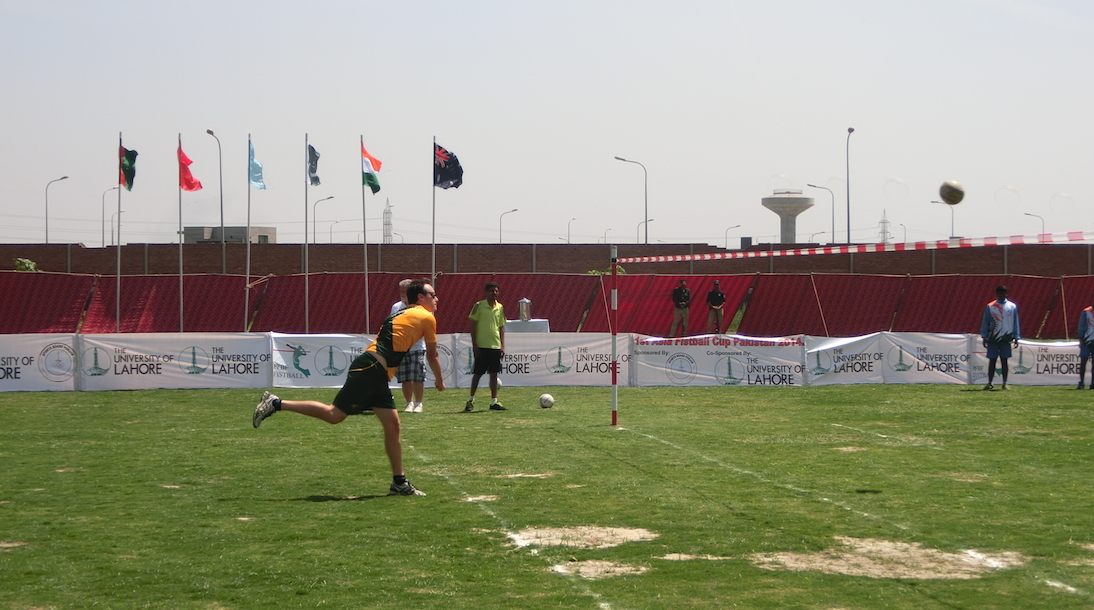
Australian attacker serves at the 2014 Asian Fistball Championships

Asia-Pacific Fistball Championships are an international fistball competition run in conjunction with the International Fistball Association (IFA), and the Asia-Pacific Fistball Association (APFC) with the first men's championships held in Pakistan in 2014. While originally known as the Asian Fistball Championships, the tournament has been renamed to the Asia-Pacific Fistball Championships for subsequent iterations, to recognise the inclusion of Oceanic region fistball associations such as Australia and New Zealand. The participating countries in the first Asia-Pacific Fistball Championships were Pakistan, India, Australia and Nepal.

== Asia-Pacific Fistball Championships - Men ==
Year	Host	Gold	Silver	Bronze
2014	Lahore (Pakistan)	Pakistan	India	Nepal
2018	Melbourne (Australia)	New Zealand	Australia	India
2022	Geelong (Australia)	New Zealand	Australia	Japan
2026	Prebbleton (New Zealand)	New Zealand	Australia	Japan

=== Overall Medals - Men's Championship ===
Rank	Nation	Apps	Gold	Silver	Bronze	Total
1	New Zealand	3	3	0	0	3
2	Pakistan	1	1	0	0	1
3	Australia	4	0	3	0	3
4	India	2	0	1	1	2
5	Japan	2	0	0	2	2
6	Nepal	1	0	0	1	1
7	Samoa	2	0	0	0	0
Totals			3	3	3	9

== Asia-Pacific Fistball Championships - Women ==
Year	Host	Gold	Silver	Bronze
2018	Melbourne (Australia)	New Zealand	Australia
2022	Geelong (Australia)	New Zealand	Australia
2026	Prebbleton (New Zealand)	New Zealand	Australia	Samoa

=== Overall Medals - Women's Championship ===
Rank	Nation	Apps	Gold	Silver	Bronze	Total
1	New Zealand	3	3	0	0	3
2	Australia	3	0	3	0	3
3	Samoa	1	0	0	1	1
4	Japan	1	0	0	0	0
Totals			2	2	0	4
