= 2015 Men's Fistball World Championships =

Tournament details
- Host country: Argentina
- Dates: 14–22 November 2015
- Teams: 14
- Venue(s): 3 (in 3 host cities)

Final positions
- Champions: Germany
- Runners-up: Switzerland
- Third place: Austria
- Fourth place: Brazil

Tournament statistics
- Matches played: 65

The 14th Men’s World Fistball Championships was held from the 14th to 22 November 2015 in Calamuchita, Córdoba in Argentina. It was the second time the Men's Fistball World Championships have been held in Argentina, having also previously been held in Buenos Aires in 1986. The tournament was held in four settlements in Córdoba Province, three of them are located in Calamuchita: Villa General Belgrano, Santa Rosa de Calamuchita and Embalse. The fourth venue was La Cumbrecita, in Santa María Department.

== Participants ==
At the Fistball World Championships in 2015, a record 15 teams have committed to take part in the competition, and increase on the 12 teams that competed at the last World Championships in 2011. Australia are expected to compete for the first time in its short history, marking the first time the Oceania region has been represented in fistball at the World Championships. Also competing for the first time will be South Africa, becoming the second African team to compete. Two new Asian region teams will take part for the first time, with India and Pakistan committed to sending teams to the tournament. Colombia will be the fifth team making its inaugural entry, becoming the fourth South American team represented.

Germany will be defending their title as World Champion, and will be joined by 9 other returning teams. Serbia and Japan are the only two teams not returning from the 2011 tournament.

These teams have provisionally reported for the World Cup in Argentina:

5 from Europe	Germany	Switzerland	Austria
	Italy	Czech Republic
4 from South America	Brazil	Chile	Colombia
including hosts:	Argentina
2 from Asia	Pakistan	India
2 from Africa	Namibia	South Africa
1 from North America	United States
1 from Oceania	Australia

== Final standing ==
Rank	Country
1	Germany
2	Switzerland
3	Austria
4	Brazil
5	Argentina
6	Chile
7	Italy
8	USA
9	Namibia
10	Colombia
11	Czech Republic
12	Pakistan
13	Australia
14	South Africa
