= 2010 European Men's Fistball Championship =

2010 sporting event

- 17th European Fistball Championships: Switzerland 2010 -
Host	Ermatingen Switzerland
Dates	August 27–29
Teams	7 national teams
- Final rankings
Champions	Austria (5th title)
Runners-up	Switzerland
Third place	Germany
Fourth place	Italy
- Tournament statistics
Matches	17

The 2010 European Men's Fistball Championship was held in Ermatingen (Switzerland) from August 27 to 29 with seven men's national teams: Austria, Catalonia, Czech Republic, Germany, Italy, Serbia and Switzerland.

== Teams ==
Group A

Austria
Dennis Brulc
M. Feichtenschlager
Dominik Hofer
Klemens Kronsteiner
Dietmar Weiß
Benedikt Eglseer
Manuel Helmberger
Christian Leitner
Harald Pühringer
Karl Rick
Siegfried Simon
Klaus Thaller
Stefan Winterleitner

Germany
Sascha Zaebe
Patrick Thomas
Steve Schmutzler
Fabian Sagstetter
Kolja Meyer
Marco Lochmahr
Christian Kläner
Marc Krüger
Adrian Debus
Michael Marx
Sascha Ball

Italy
Thomas Vonmetz
Florian Rottensteiner
Thomas Meran
Tobias Prudenziati
Lukas Tovazzi
Philipp Frasnelli
Christian Scartezzini
Fabian Obexer
Armin Runer
Simon Prudenziati

Switzerland
Cyrill Schreiber
Marco Baumann
Cyrill Jäger
Martin Dünner
Dominik Guggerli
Manuel Sieber
Stefan Ziegler
Marcel Eicher
Ueli Frischknecht

Group B

Catalonia
Daniel Sarrión
Oscar Suárez
Luis González
Jordi Matador
Javier Ruiz
Antoni Bernadet
Jordi Cantó
Bernat Poch

Czech Republic
Michal Krajicek
Petr Kuna
Michael Beck
Jakub Hobza
Martin Zivny
Robert Forman
Jan Mazal jr.
Jan Forst
Daniel Mazal

Serbia
Aleksandar Milojevic
Milos Milurovic
Ivan Milenkovic
Nikola Biberovic
Milan Kavaric
Vojislav Skoric
Zoran Cvetkovic
Mirko Neskovic
Marko Stojanovic
Nenad Kovacevic
Dusan Zezelj
Sinisa Pantovic
Sasa Jovic
Zoran Jovancovic
Dusan Ilic

== First round ==
=== Group A ===
GROUP A	Pts	P	W	L	S+	S-	DS
Austria	6	3	3	0	9	3	+6
Germany	4	3	2	1	7	5	+2
Switzerland	2	3	1	2	7	6	+1
Italy	0	3	0	3	0	9	-9

August 27 - 10:30
August 27 - 10:30	Switzerland	3-0	Italy	Ermatingen
August 27 - 10:30	11-6, 11-5, 11-3			Ermatingen

August 27 - 14:15
August 27 - 14:15	Austria	3-1	Germany	Ermatingen
August 27 - 14:15	9-11, 11-8, 11-7, 11-9			Ermatingen

August 27 - 18:00
August 27 - 18:00	Germany	3-0	Italy	Ermatingen
August 27 - 18:00	11-3, 11-3, 11-6			Ermatingen

August 27 - 18:00
August 27 - 18:00	Switzerland	2-3	Austria	Ermatingen
August 27 - 18:00	9-11, 7-11, 11-7, 11-5, 10-12			Ermatingen

August 28 - 10:30
August 28 - 10:30	Austria	3-0	Italy	Ermatingen
August 28 - 10:30	11-5, 11-4, 11-8			Ermatingen

August 28 - 10:30
August 28 - 10:30	Switzerland	2-3	Germany	Ermatingen
August 28 - 10:30	5-11, 8-11, 11-5, 11-9, 7-11			Ermatingen

=== Group B ===
GROUP B	Pts	P	W	L	S+	S-	DS
(Czech Republic) Czech Rep.	4	2	2	0	6	4	+2
Serbia	2	2	1	1	5	3	+2
Catalonia	0	2	0	2	2	6	-4

August 27 - 10:30
August 27 - 10:30	Serbia	2-3	Czech Republic	Ermatingen
August 27 - 10:30	11-7, 7-11, 11-9, 7-11, 12-14			Ermatingen

August 27 - 14:15
August 27 - 14:15	Serbia	3-0	Catalonia	Ermatingen
August 27 - 14:15	11-4, 11-7, 11-9			Ermatingen

August 28 - 10:30
August 28 - 10:30	Catalonia	2-3	Czech Republic	Ermatingen
August 28 - 10:30	11-7, 8-11, 14-15, 11-6, 6-11			Ermatingen

== Semifinals classification ==
Match classification 4th group A - 1st group B

August 28 - 14:15
August 28 - 14:15	Italy	3-1	Czech Republic	Ermatingen
August 28 - 14:15	11-7, 11-6, 9-11, 11-9			Ermatingen

== 5th-7th places ==
5th-7th places	Pts	P	W	L	S+	S-	DS
Serbia	4	2	2	0	6	3	+3
(Czech Republic) Czech Rep.	2	2	1	1	5	3	+2
Catalonia	0	2	0	2	1	6	-5

August 28 - 18:00
August 28 - 18:00	Czech Republic	3-0	Catalonia	Ermatingen
August 28 - 18:00	11-8, 11-7, 11-7			Ermatingen

August 29 - 09:30
August 29 - 09:30	Serbia	3-1	Catalonia	Ermatingen
August 29 - 09:30	11-8, 11-0, 7-11, 11-7			Ermatingen

August 29 - 10:45
August 29 - 10:45	Czech Republic	2-3	Serbia	Ermatingen
August 29 - 10:45	11-9, 11-13, 9-11, 13-11, 10-12			Ermatingen

== Final round ==
Semi-finals
August 28 - Ermatingen
Germany	2
Switzerland	3
August 28 - Ermatingen
Austria	3
Italy	1

Final
August 28 - Ermatingen
Switzerland	1
(Austria) AUSTRIA	4
Third place
August 28 - Ermatingen
Germany	4
Italy	0

=== Semifinals ===
August 28 - 15:30
August 28 - 15:30	Germany	2-3	Switzerland	Ermatingen
August 28 - 15:30	8-11, 9-11, 11-8, 11-7, 5-11			Ermatingen

August 28 - 18:00
August 28 - 18:00	Austria	3-1	Italy	Ermatingen
August 28 - 18:00	9-11, 11-7, 11-8, 11-9			Ermatingen

=== Finals ===
3rd-4th places

August 29 - 12:00
August 29 - 12:00	Germany	4-0	Italy	Ermatingen
August 29 - 12:00	11-9, 11-3, 11-3, 11-8			Ermatingen

Final

August 29 - 14:00
August 29 - 14:00	Austria	4-1	Switzerland	Ermatingen
August 29 - 14:00	9-11, 11-6, 11-6, 11-8, 11-8			Ermatingen

Winners
AUSTRIA

== Final standings ==
Final standings
1	Austria
2	Switzerland
3	Germany
4	Italy
5	Serbia
6	(Czech Republic) Czech Rep.
7	Catalonia
