= Fistball =

Sport of European origin

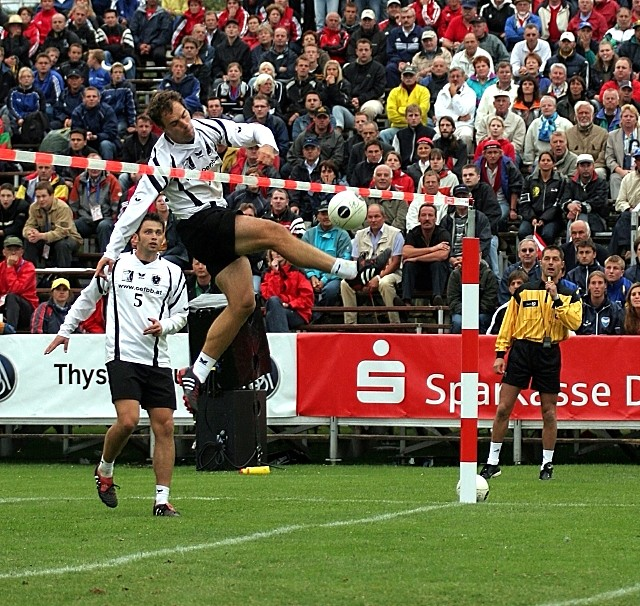
- A fistball attacker hits the ball over the net
- Highest governing body: International Fistball Association (IFA)
- Nicknames: big ball
- First played: First mentioned year 240, first organised play in 1894

Characteristics
- Team members: 5 players per team
- Mixed-sex: No
- Type: Outdoor (summer) and indoor (winter)
- Equipment: Fistball, net
- Venue: Field (outdoor) and court (indoor)

Presence
- Olympic: No
- World Games: 1985 – present

Semi-final Germany Vs. Switzerland, European Championship, 2012

Fistball is a sport of European origin, primarily played in the German-speaking nations of Austria, Germany and Switzerland, as well as in Brazil. The objective of the game is similar to volleyball, in that teams try to hit a ball over a net, but the rules vary from volleyball in several major ways. The current men's fistball World Champions are Germany, winners of both the 2023 Men's World Championships and the fistball category at the 2022 World Games, while the current women's fistball World Champions are also Germany, after winning the 2021 Women's World Championships.

== History ==
When fistball was invented is unknown, but its roots probably lie in Southern Europe, or more specifically, Italy. The earliest known written mention of the game is by Roman Emperor Gordian III from 240 AD. Rules for an Italian version of fistball were recorded by Antonio Scaino in 1555. In the 16th century, the game experienced a renaissance, although it was mostly regarded as a pastime for nobles and gentry.

In 1786, Johann Wolfgang von Goethe mentioned fistball games between "four noblemen from Verona and four Venetians" in his diary An Italian Journey. It was only in 1870 that fistball was introduced to Germany, led by Georg Weber. The sport was mainly played by gymnasts and was therefore regarded as a gymnastic sport. Fistball was first presented to the public in 1885 at the German Gymnastics Festival in Dresden. In 1894, Georg Weber, along with Heinrich Schnell, drafted the first rules that outlined a competitive and organised sport. The play and scoring, however, differed significantly from fistball as it is known today.

Subsequently, the sport spread to surrounding, mainly German-speaking, countries, and German emigrants also brought the sport to all continents, particularly in South America and West Africa. Fistball was first introduced to the United States in 1911 by high school teacher Christopher Carlton who had experienced it on holiday in Italy.

At the 1913 German Gymnastics Festival in Leipzig, the first German men's championships were held, where LLB Frankfurt won against 1879 MTV Munich, winning 114:101. Due to the First World War, no German Championships were held between 1914 and 1920. In 1921, the first women's fistball championship was held, with Hamburger Turnerschaft defeating TV Krefeld by 91:90. Fistball, while still a game affiliated to the Gymnastics Association, began to grow independently. In 1927, almost 12,000 teams played organised fistball in Germany.

Due to the rapid spread of the fistball game and improved game skills, further changes in the rules were necessary, with a greater focus on winning points through forcing errors. This style of play was more athletic and dynamic, and tactics began to change significantly. The development of fistball was halted by the Second World War.

In order to encourage development and improve performance, the International Fistball Association (IFA) was founded in 1960, which is the umbrella organization of all national fistball organizations worldwide.

The first IFA World Championships for men were held in Linz, Austria in 1968, with West Germany winning gold. The first IFA World Championships for women were held in Buenos Aires, Argentina in 1994, with Germany winning gold. Both tournaments are currently held quadrennially.

A relative latecomer to fistball, Australia established their own fistball federation in 2013 and host a national league, the Victorian Fistball League, notably including Melbourne Thunder and Fist Club. South Africa followed a year later in also establishing their own federation.

== Gameplay ==
=== Overview ===
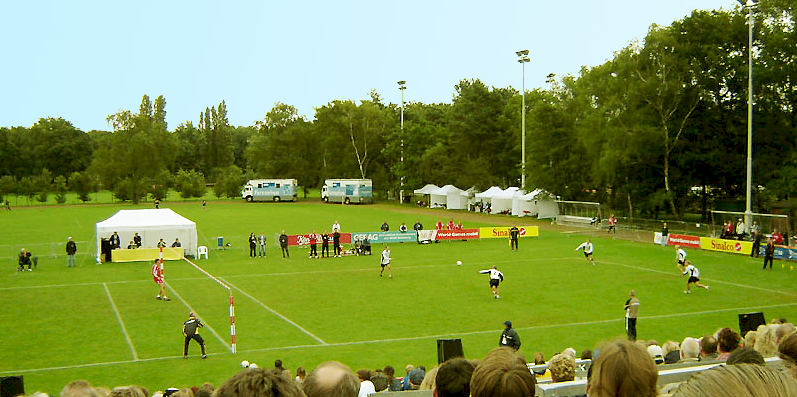
A fistball team defends

Fistball is a team sport in which two teams compete against each other on two half-fields, similar to volleyball. They are separated by a center line and a net stretched between two posts up to two meters in height. If the net or posts are touched by either a player or the ball during play, this is considered an error.

Each team consists of five players, with players trying to play the ball across the net from one half of the field of play to the opponents' half – using only their arm or closed fist (unlike in volleyball where open hands are allowed) – in a way in which the opponents cannot return it. After clearing the net, the ball may be contacted up to three times by the five players on each team – with a bounce being permissible before each contact (also unlike in volleyball where no bounce is allowed), but no repeat hits by any individual player within the three attempts. Similar to volleyball, the three hits are ideally used to save, set and spike the ball back into the opponents half, in that order.

=== Scoring ===
The game is played for points and sets. If a team cannot return the ball or makes an error, the other team gets a point. The team that lost the last point or committed the last error makes the next service. A set ends when one team has scored 11 points and is at least 2 points in the lead (i.e. at least 11:9). If the score reaches 10:10, play will be extended automatically until one of the teams takes the lead by 2, or is the first to win 15 points (scores may therefore end 15–14). The number of winning sets varies depending on the game class, but is generally played to best of five or three.

In some cases, set results are limited by time, and this can be common in large tournaments for organizational purposes.

=== Errors ===
The most important errors (i.e. points to the opposing team) are as follows:

- The ball or a player touches the net or post.
- The ball touches the ground outside the court.
- The ball touches the ground twice in a row without any contact by a player in between.
- The ball is played on the side of the post past or below the net into the opponent's box.
- More than three players on a team to touch the ball during a game turn.
- A player touches the ball a second time within a turn.
- The ball touches a part of the body other than the upper or lower arm or fist. For example, the ball cannot touch the head, foot, or open palm of the hand.
- A player's first grounding foot lands over the service line on a serve.

== Field ==
Dimensions of an outdoor fistball field

Fistball is not a seasonal sport. In summer (field season), it is played outside on a grass or turf sports field (field size 50 x 20 m). In winter (indoor season) is played in an indoor sports hall, and generally an already existing handball court is used as a playing field (field size 40 x 20 m). In the hall, the ball has a more controlled bounce than on grass, which has an effect on the game tactics. In addition, in the hall, any wall contact by the ball is an error.

In outdoor fistball, the field size is 50 m long by 20 m wide (25 x 20 m per half-field). In indoor fistball, the field size is 40 m long by 20 m wide (20 x 20 m per half-field). Since the indoor field size corresponds with the regular size of a handball field, the existing external lines are usually used. The service line is 3 m away from the center line. The server's stationery foot (for standing serves) or first landing foot (for jumping serves) must be completely behind this line when serving. The boundary lines belong to the field, i.e. when the ball touches the line, this is not an error and play will continue.

The playing field is divided in half by a 5 cm wide ribbon-like red and white net. It is held above the center line between two posts, its upper edge is located at 2 m height (men) and 1.90 m (women). For the D-Youth (under 12), the height is 1.60 m, the C-youth (under 14 years) 1.80 m. The field also includes a run-off area, which when playing outdoors is 8 m to the rear and 6 m on the sides. For indoor play, run-off areas are limited by the wall or stands, but are generally a minimum of 1 m to the rear and 0.5 m at the sides.

The field dimensions given are for adult players, as youth fields are generally smaller.

== Ball ==
A standard fistball is hollow, filled with air and is made of leather. It must be inflated evenly until it is round and taut. For indoor fistball games, and for different weather conditions in outdoor fistball games, players can use trade association-approved balls with different surfaces (for example, natural leather, plastic coating, rubberized surface).

The weight of a ball can vary between 320 and 350 g (females) and 350-380 g (males). Its scope must be 65–68 cm, and its air pressure from 0.55 to 0.75 bar. It is thus as hard as a soccer ball (0.6-0.7 bar) and harder than a volleyball (0.29 to 0.32 bar). In physical size, it is similar to a football or a volleyball.

The right to select the game ball is determined by lot before the game and replaced after each set. Increasingly, uniform balls are outlined and provided by the organizers to ensure equal opportunity for all teams participating at international championships.

The ball can often be spiked at speeds of up to 100–120 km / h.

In the field of youth other ball dimensions come (especially lower weights) are used, see the regulations.

== Strategy and tactics ==
=== Formation ===
Formations used for outdoor (A) and indoor (B)

In contrast to volleyball, where the players rotate and assume a different position after each change of service, in fistball each player has a fixed position. While players can rotate into different positions during a game, this is rather unusual, as each player is a specialist in their position. Another difference from volleyball is that a fistball playing field is much larger, and fistball teams have fewer players on the field at one time than volleyball teams, and therefore fistball players are required to cover much more space during play. The main reason for these differences is because the ball can bounce once between each player's hit, resulting in differing strategies to volleyball.

Depending on playing conditions (hardwood or grass, wet ground etc.), formations can change. In the image, two different formations are shown:

Team A shows the typical formation for outdoor play on grass ( W-shape ). The setter covers the front middle to be ready for short balls (e.g. drop shots) played by the opposition. However, the setter also need to be prepared for hard attacking shots played through the middle by the opposition, and quick reflexes are required to be able to defend these.

Team B shows the typical formation for indoor play on hardwood ( U-shape ). As the bounce of the ball indoors is more predictable, short balls are not as effective. Therefore, the setter moves to the rear foul line to assist on defense. However, the setter constantly runs to the front after each defense in order to set the ball for the attackers.

At international levels, outdoor fistball is also played in the U-shape, mainly due to the better defenses that it can provide against fast and powerful attacking shots. The players playing at this level are required to have significant speed and fitness in order to cover the ground for both defending and attacking hits.

Another formation option, although rare, is the V-shape. This is generally used when playing on wet grass. In this case the setter stands behind the baseline and the two defensive players move diagonally inwards to form a V shape. As an attacking shot hit on wet grass tends to slip more and bounce less, this formation gives teams more chance to get underneath the bounce of the ball to hit it upward in return.

Substitutions may be anywhere at any position field, but only before that team is about to serve, during a time out, between sets, or whenever the referee has stopped play.

=== Serving ===
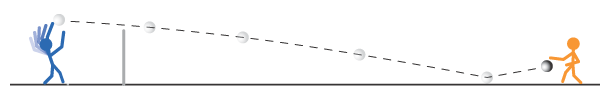
Trajectory of a standard serve to an opponent's defender

Force, accuracy and fluid sequence of body movements are necessary to make full effect of the service. With a service, the server will attempt to achieve a direct point with it via an "ace", or will at least hope to force the opponent into a difficult first hit, thereby affecting the buildup of the opponent's return hit. The ball is hit mostly with the inner surface of the fist, due to control. However, if the server wishes to hit the ball with full force, they will use the edge of a clenched hand. This is called a "hammer hit", and carries greater risk of failure due to the smaller impact surface than the inner surface of the fist.

The server will attempt to hit the ball into an area on the opposition's side of the field that will be difficult for the opposition to return. For example, this can be done by hitting the ball long to the back line, directly at the feet of an opposition player, diagonally across the court, or with a short ball just over the net.

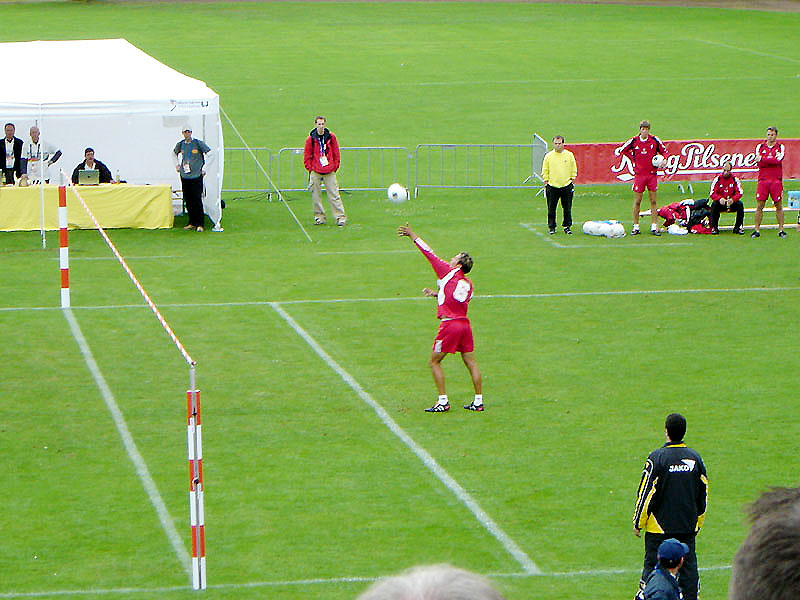
A fistballer prepares to serve the ball

A difficult, yet highly effective variation to the serve is to add curve to the hit. This can be done by sweeping across the ball from left to right, or vice versa, when hitting with the inside surface of the fist. If done correctly, the ball should appear to curve away from or into the opposition, confusing their return.

When preparing to serve, the server must stand behind the service line (3-meter line). Upon completion of the service hit, the server's first contact with the ground must be behind the service line. For example, if the server jumps while serving, the first foot to touch the ground upon landing must be behind the line. The second foot may then land in front of the line. This same rule applies for standing serves. If this is not correctly complete, the server will be charged with a fault, and the opposition will receive a point. In addition, the ball must visibly leave the hand prior to hitting (i.e. it must be thrown). It must not be pushed away out of the holding hand in an attempt to surprise the opponent, as this will also count as an error.

=== Defense ===
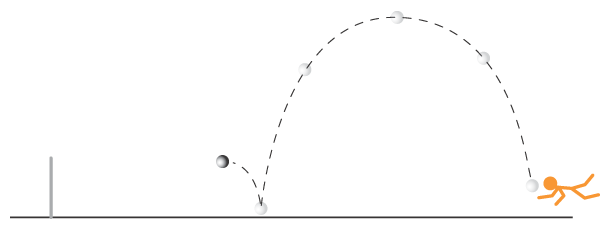
Ideal trajectory of a defended ball

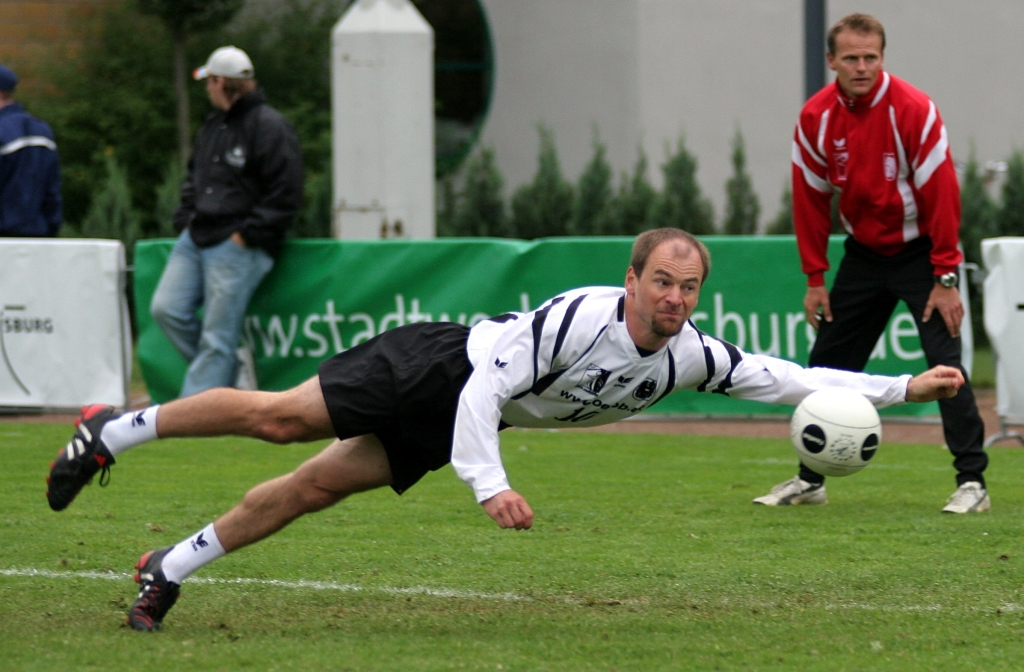
A fistballer defends the ball at full stretch

The defender must be skillful in order to ensure their team can launch an effective attack. If a defensive shot is returned ineffectively, there will be little chance for a strong attack. The ball from an opponent's strong attacking hit or serve can be very hard to return, and most successful defenses are the result of running hard for the return. Players will often be required to jump or dive in order to reach the ball even before it hits the ground for the second time.

A good defense is performed using the inside of the forearm while positioned behind the ball, facing the net. If the inside of the forearm not exactly behind the ball, the ball will not go in the desired direction, and will instead go erratically sideways. This is especially the case when the ball is wet.

In order to lower the physical impact of the hit, one can retract the arm at the moment of impact, but this can be difficult. A good defender possesses agility, speed, responsiveness, technical ability, positional sense and courage to put in physical effort to make contact. Commitment of each player makes up the foundation of the fistball sport dynamic.

=== Setting ===
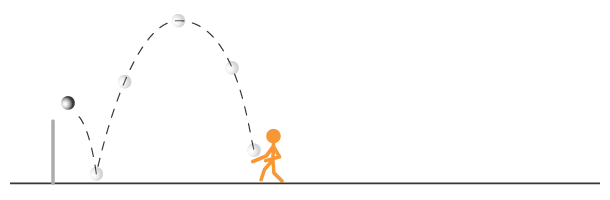
The trajectory of a standard indirect set

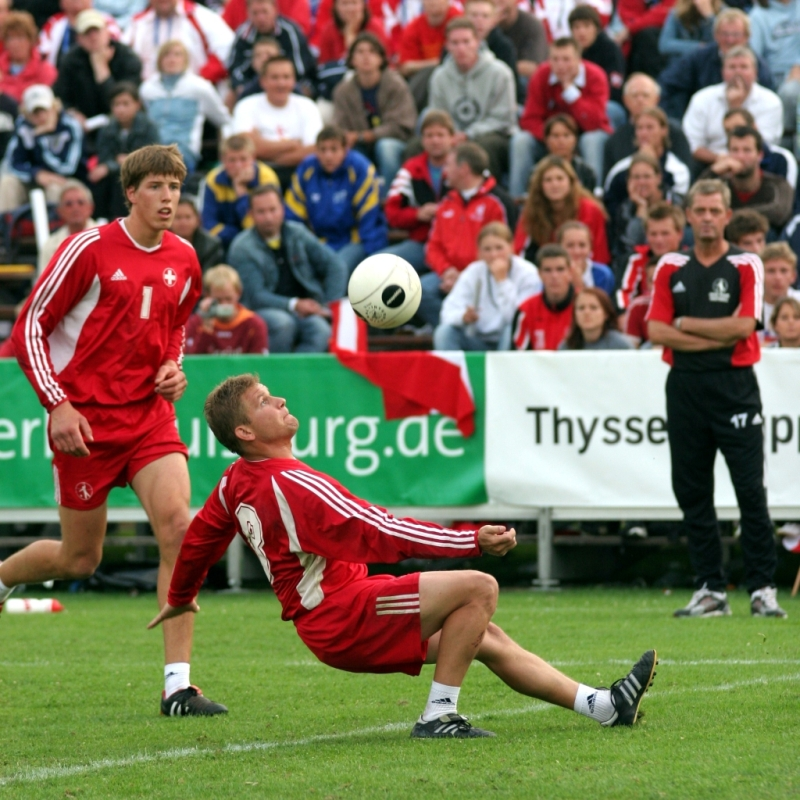
A fistballer sets the ball

The setter substantially affects the nature of the following attack. The setter must be able to position the ball in the air and on the field in a place that an attack can effectively take place. This hit may need to take place from anywhere on the field, including the baseline, close to the net or even from outside the field of play.

If the ball is set for the attack by hitting the ball in the air and allowing for a bounce, this is called an indirect set. The setter has to calculate the trajectory of the hit so that the bounce is at its highest point approximately 2.5 - 3.0 m in height, as this is the most effective height for an attacker to jump and strike the ball over the net. The field conditions, distance to the net and possibly the wind direction all have to be taken into account when performing the set. In addition, the ball should ideally have some forward spin so that the attacker can use this forward momentum in their attacking hit.

The setter can also hit the ball so that it is hit directly by the attacker without the ball first touching the ground; this is called a direct set. The setter will often call "direct" or "indirect" prior to the set, to allow the attacker to adjust their approach.

Most sets are performed by the setter; however, in many situations one of the attackers will be required to set due either to positioning, or the setter having already been forced to hit in defense. A good attacker must also be competent in setting the ball.

=== Attacking ===
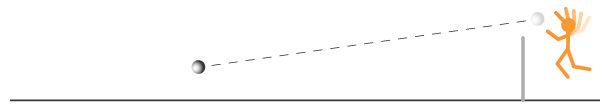
The trajectory of a long hit by an attacker

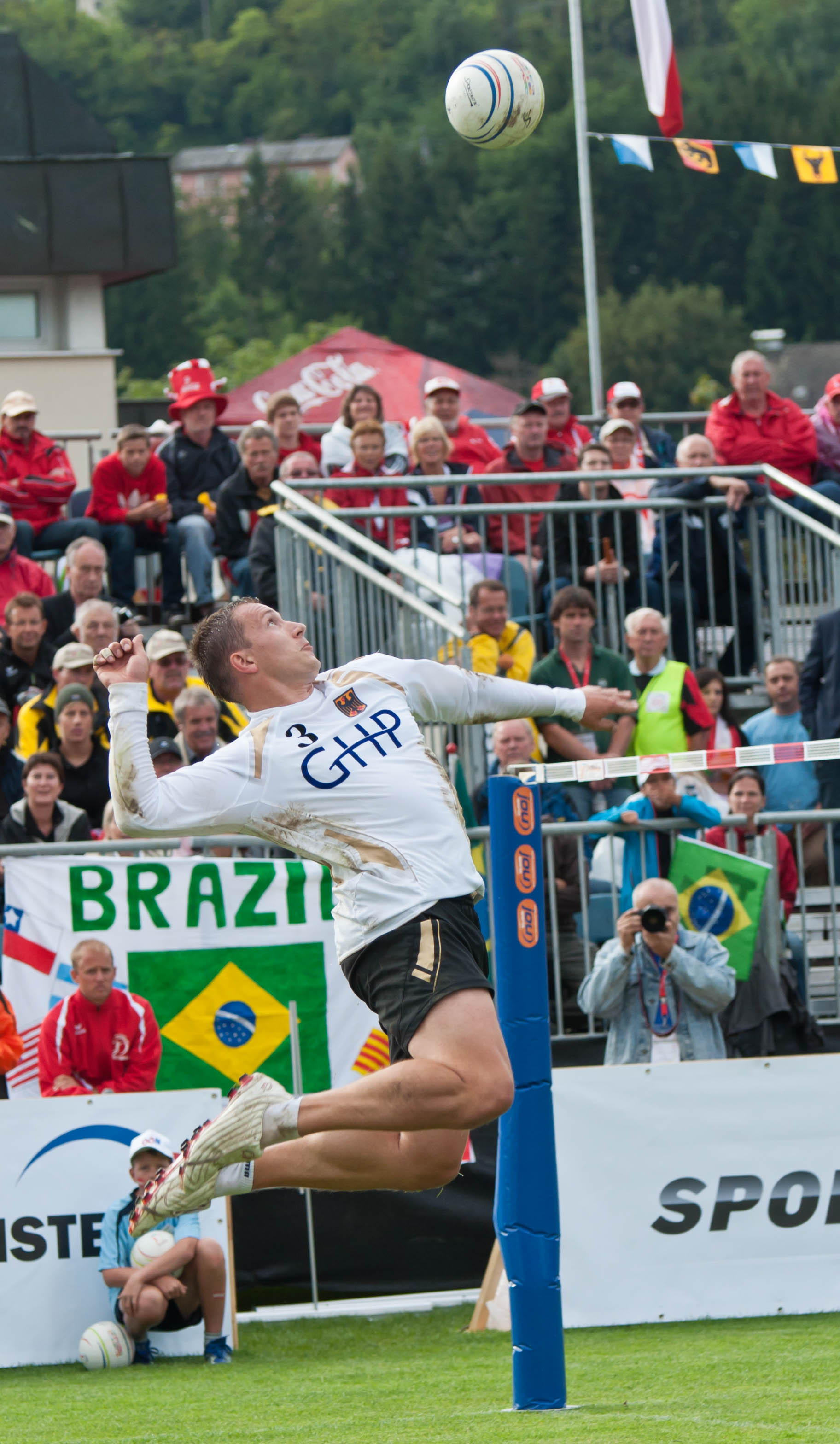
An attacker prepares to strike the ball

A good attacker will be able to hit the ball with high impact (good hits will reach speeds of over 100 km/h), be able to access weaknesses in the positional play of the opponent and have a great repertoire of strokes. The primary attacker is positioned next to the server, who acts as the secondary attacker. The attacker uses the forward spin of a well-placed ball from a set to jump and hit it with full force into the gaps of opposing defenses.

Ideally, the attacker must be unpredictable to the opposition, ensuring the direction and speed of the attack can not be predicted by the defense until the hit takes place. As with the server, the attacker has a wide range of possible variations for attack, but the choice and effectiveness of each hit are particularly dependent on the success or failure of his team's ability to set up the attack from defense.

For indoor fistball, the dimensions of the court change the approach of the attack, as the run-out section for indoor play is usually very limited due to the close proximity of walls. This fact is exploited by the setter, who will try to place the ball just about the net so that the attacker can hit the ball sharply across the court, restricting the opponents ability to get behind the ball before it hits the wall. In order to stop this occurring, the opponent must attempt to block the ball at the net, similar to volleyball. This has significant effect on the formation and strategy of defending teams.

== Referees ==
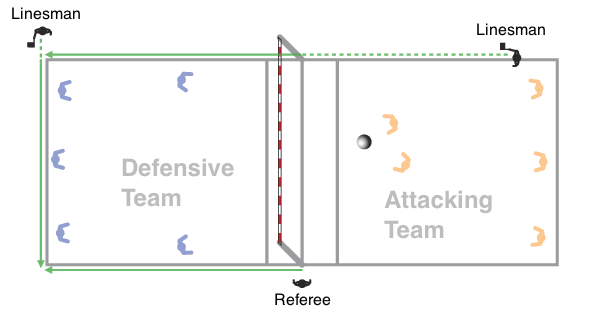
Fistball referees

A fistball game is controlled by a referee, who is assisted by two linesmen.

The referee has sole decision-making power. They make the final decision on all points or errors. Since the linesmen are relatively far away from the referee, they are also responsible for observing the sidelines on his side of the field.

The linesmen are stationed in the opposite corners of the field from the referee, and use flags to signal their calls. Their task is to make judgements on line calls, similar to a soccer linesman. The observation area of the two linesmen is dependent on which of the two teams is currently attacking and which is defending. The linesman on the attacking side is responsible for the entire sideline to the end, and therefore he or she turns to face the side line. The linesman on the defending side is level with the base line and is therefore solely responsible for observing that line. The linesmen change their observation areas as the play changes between attack and defense.

In addition to displaying off balls (flag held upwards) or good balls (flag held downwards) the referee is used to rule violations or other important game situations, such as substitutions, injuries, unsportsmanlike conduct etc.

== Competitions ==
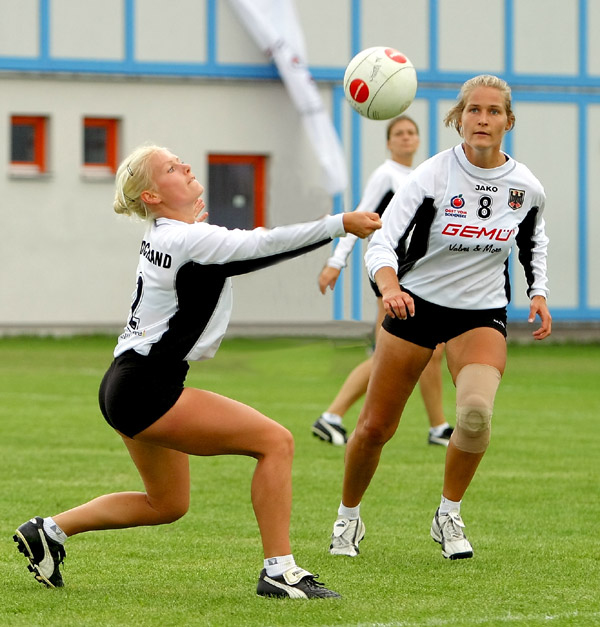
A fistballer sets the ball during international competition

The biggest international competition in fistball is the Fistball World Championships, currently held every four years. All member countries of the IFA are invited to participate in each event, with 10-12 teams usually qualifying for the tournament. The competition location changes with each event, but is usually held in either Europe or South America. The Fistball World Championship for women is held one year prior to the Fistball World Championship for men, and generally in a different host country to the one chosen for the subsequent men's tournament. In the men's tournament, Germany, Austria, Switzerland, Brazil, Argentina, Chile, Namibia and Italy have competed in every tournament since 1990, while Serbia, USA and Japan have also been frequent participants. The first Fistball World Championship was held for men in 1968, and for women in 1994.

The top five teams from the Men's Fistball World Championships are also invited to compete in the fistball category of the World Games, also held every four years. If the host nation is a member of the IFA the sixth team is the fistball team of the host nation, otherwise the sixth placed team at the most recent World Championship is invited. While not directly facilitated by the IFA, this event has significant prestige.

In addition to World Championships, international continental competitions are held for teams within Europe, South America and, most recently, Asia.

For club competitions, the Fistball World Cup is held every year for both indoor and outdoor competitions, with the best clubs in the world competing. Individual European and South American championships are also held for clubs, which are used as qualification for the World Cup competition.

=== Major competitions ===
- Fistball World Championships
- Fistball at the World Games
- Fistball European Championships
- Asia-Pacific Fistball Championships

== Notable players ==
- Dirk Schachtsiek
