= Lloyd Wallace =

British freestyle skier

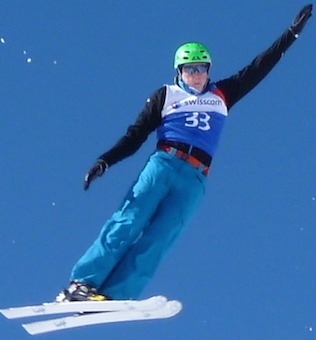

Personal information
- National team: Team GB (Great Britain)
- Citizenship: British
- Born: 13 February 1995 (age 31)

Sport
- Country: Great Britain
- Sport: Freestyle skiing

Achievements and titles
- Olympic finals: 2018, 2022
Medal record
Representing Great Britain
FIS Freestyle Junior World Ski Championships
Bronze medal – third place	2015	Aerials
FIS Freestyle Europa Cup
Gold medal – first place	2015	Aerials
Silver medal – second place	2015	Aerials

Lloyd Wallace (born 13 February 1995) is a British freestyle skier who competed at the 2018 and 2022 Winter Olympics.

== Career ==
Wallace was a gymnast, before switching to aerial skiing at the age of 14, after a family skiing holiday in Tignes, France. He won a bronze medal at the 2015 FIS Junior freestyle skiing championships. He was the first British skier to win a Europa Cup in men's aerial skiing at Airolo, Switzerland, in March 2015. In August 2017 whilst Wallace was training in Mettmenstetten, Switzerland, he had an accident which left him unconscious. He was then put in an induced coma. Wallace later said that the accident was caused by hitting the edge of a ramp. Wallace recovered at the Bisham Abbey National Sports Centre, and returned to training two months after the accident. Wallace competed at the 2018 Winter Olympics in Pyeongchang, South Korea where he performed two types of triple twisting triple somersaults. He was the first British aerial skier to compete at the Olympics since Kevin Harbut in the 1998 Winter Olympics in Nagano, Japan. He finished 20th in the event.

After the 2018 Olympics, Wallace took a two-year break from freestyle skiing, returning in October 2020, self-funding until the discipline finally received funding from UK Sport in January 2022. In March 2021, he came third at a European Cup event in Switzerland. He almost missed the FIS Freestyle Ski and Snowboarding World Championships 2021 in Almaty, Kazakhstan due to a visa issue, but was able to compete. He finished 15th, and a few days later, he came ninth at the 2020–21 FIS Freestyle Ski World Cup event at the same venue.

In January 2022, Wallace was selected for the aerials event at the 2022 Winter Olympics in Beijing, China. He performed two quadruple-twisting triple somersaults, becoming the first Briton to do so. He finished 21st in the qualifying round and did not qualify for the final.

== Personal life ==
Wallace's mother Jilly (née Curry) competed at the 1992 and 1994 Winter Olympics and won 29 FIS World Cup medals, which at the time was more than any other British skier or snowboarder. Wallace's father Robin competed for Great Britain at the 1988 Winter Olympics in Calgary, Canada. His grandfather Peter Curry competed at the 1948 Summer Olympics in the 3000 metres steeplechase, and his uncle Shaun Wallace competed in track cycling at the 1984 and 1996 Summer Olympics.

Wallace graduated from the University of Bath in July 2017. He was awarded a Full Blue by the University of Bath in 2017, and was the guest speaker at the 2018 award ceremony.

To fund his skiing career, Wallace works as a Sports Management Agent, representing several Olympic and Paralympic athletes.
