= 2021 Telemark World Championships =

International skiing competition

2021 FIS Telemark World Championships
- Location: Melchsee-Frutt, Switzerland
- Dates: 18 to 21 March 2021

The 2021 FIS Telemark World Championships was the 23rd edition of the telemark skiing event, organised by the International Ski Federation (FIS). The championships were held from 18 to 21 March 2021 in Melchsee-Frutt, Switzerland.

== Medal summary ==
=== Medal table ===
* Host nation (Switzerland)

Rank	Nation	Gold	Silver	Bronze	Total
1	Switzerland*	6	3	5	14
2	Norway	1	2	1	4
3	Germany	0	1	1	2
4	France	0	1	0	1
Totals (4 entries)		7	7	7	21

=== Men ===
Event	Gold		Silver		Bronze	
Classic	Bastien Dayer; Switzerland	1:28.19	Trym Nygaard Løken; Norway	1:31.44	Nicolas Michel; Switzerland	1:32.89
Sprint	Bastien Dayer; Switzerland	1:32.55	Trym Nygaard Løken; Norway	1:33.76	Nicolas Michel; Switzerland	1:34.27
Parallel sprint	Trym Nygaard Løken; Norway		Bastien Dayer; Switzerland		Nicolas Michel; Switzerland	

=== Women ===
Event	Gold		Silver		Bronze	
Classic	Amélie Wenger-Reymond; Switzerland	1:35.21	Johanna Holzmann; Germany	1:35.66	Martina Wyss; Switzerland	1:37.25
Sprint	Amélie Wenger-Reymond; Switzerland	1:38.65	Martina Wyss; Switzerland	1:40.92	Beatrice Zimmermann; Switzerland	1:44.33
Parallel sprint	Amélie Wenger-Reymond; Switzerland		Beatrice Zimmermann; Switzerland		Johanna Holzmann; Germany	

=== Team ===
Event	Gold	Silver	Bronze
Parallel sprint	Switzerland	France	Norway
