= FIS Games =

International multi-sport event

- Status: Upcoming
- Genre: Multi-sport event
- Frequency: Quadrennial
- Inaugurated: 2028
- Founder: International Ski and Snowboard Federation
- Next event: 2028
- Organiser: International Ski and Snowboard Federation

The FIS Games is an international multi-sport event organized and centered around the disciplines governed by the International Ski and Snowboard Federation. Held once every four years, the 16-day event will debut in 2028.

== History ==
In October 2022 the International Ski and Snowboard Federation announced their plans for a multi-sport event of all FIS disciplines. Which would be included as part of the World Cup circuit for each discipline instead of being a championship event. Filling the one-year gap in every four-year cycle where Olympic games and World Championships are not held. The games were initially announced to debut in February 2024, aiming to promote the sports featured in the games through television.

In May 2023 it was announced that the 2024 edition would not occur, pushing the debut of the games to 2028. Though the 2028 games was confirmed to move forward with the beginning of its bidding process.

== Disciplines ==
The games will feature about 100 medal events in disciplines that the International Ski and Snowboard Federation governs. The program also include disciplines that are not held during the Winter Olympic and Winter Paralympics.

- Alpine: Downhill, slalom, giant slalom, Super G, Alpine combined, Nations team event
- Cross-country: Sprint, Team sprint, 10km/10km and 15 km/15km skiathlon, 10 km/15km individual F/C, 30 km/50km mass start F/C, Relay
- Freeride: Ski, Snowboard
- Freestyle & freeski: Big air, Halfpipe, Slopestyle, Ski cross, Ski cross mixed team, Moguls, Dual moguls, Dual moguls mixed team, Aerials, Aerials mixed team
- Nordic combined: Normal hill/Gundersen, Mixed team, Team, Large hill/Gundersen
- Para-alpine skiing (Standing, Vision impaired, Sitting): Downhill, Super G, Alpine combined, giant slalom, Slalom, Parallel
- Para snowboard (Upper limb, Lower limb 1, Lower limb 2): Snowboard cross, Dual banked slalom, Team events
- Para cross-country skiing (Standing, Vision impaired, Sitting): Individual, Open relay, Mixed relay, Sprint
- Snowboard: Big air, Halfpipe, Slopestyle, Snowboard cross, Snowboard cross mixed team, Parallel giant slalom, Parallel slalom, Parallel (Giant) slalom mixed team
- Ski jumping: Normal hill, Normal hill team, Mixed team, Large hill, Large hill team, Ski flying
- Speed skiing
- Telemark: Classic, Sprint, Parallel sprint, Team parallel sprint

== Editions ==
The games last for 16 days and is held every four years during the year which the Olympics, Paralympics, and World Championships that involve snow sports are not held. The location of the games are flexible with the ability to be held in a variety of regions and across borders.

Edition	Year	Location	Start date	End date
1	2028			

== See also ==
- Winter Olympic Games – similar more notable event
- Winter Paralympic Games – similar more notable event for athletes with disabilities
- FISU World University Games – similar event for university athletes
