= FIS Telemark World Cup =

Telemark skiing competition

- Genre: Telemark skiing
- Inaugurated: 1995; 31 years ago
- Organiser: International Ski and Snowboard Federation
- 2025–26 FIS Telemark World Cup

The FIS Telemark World Cup is a Telemark skiing competition organized by the International Ski and Snowboard Federation (FIS), representing the highest level of international competition for men and women in the sport. It was first introduced in the 1995 season.

== Standings ==
The table below shows the three highest ranked skiers for each world cup season.

=== Men ===
==== Overall ====
Season	Winner	Runner-up	Third
1995			
1996			
1997	(Norway) Atle Enberget	(Norway) Fredrik Møller	(Norway) Marius Møbius
1998	(Switzerland) Marcel Waser	(Switzerland) Patrick Leopold	(Sweden) Bjarne Rickardsson
1999	(Switzerland) Patrick Leopold	(Switzerland) Marcel Waser	(Norway) Sondre Wabakken Engell
2000	(United States) Reid Sabin	(Finland) Antti-Pekka Auvinen	(Sweden) Per Bylund
2001	(United States) Reid Sabin (2)	(Sweden) Per Bylund	(Finland) Antti-Pekka Auvinen
2002	(Norway) Eirik Rykhus	(Slovenia) David Primožič	(Switzerland) Patrick Leopold
2003	(Norway) Kjetil Søvik	(Norway) Eirik Rykhus	(Norway) Halvor Drøpping
2004	(Norway) Eirik Rykhus (2)	(Norway) Børge Søvik	(Norway) Kjetil Søvik
2005	(Norway) Eirik Rykhus (3)	(Norway) Kjetil Søvik	(Norway) Børge Søvik
2006	(Norway) Børge Søvik	(Norway) Eirik Rykhus (2)	(Norway) Daniel Halnes
2007	(Norway) Eirik Rykhus (4)	(Norway) Børge Søvik (2)	(Norway) Daniel Halnes (2)
2008	(Norway) Børge Søvik (2)	(Norway) Daniel Halnes	(Sweden) Matthias Wagenius
2008–09	(Norway) Eirik Rykhus (5)	(Sweden) Matthias Wagenius	(Norway) Børge Søvik (2)
2010	(Sweden) Matthias Wagenius	(France) Philippe Lau	(France) Chris Lau
2011	(France) Philippe Lau	(Norway) Eirik Rykhus (3)	(Sweden) Matthias Wagenius (2)
2012	(France) Philippe Lau (2)	(Germany) Tobias Müller	(Switzerland) Bastien Dayer
2013	(Sweden) Matthias Wagenius (2)	(France) Philippe Lau (2)	(Germany) Tobias Müller
2013–14	(Germany) Tobias Müller	(France) Philippe Lau (3)	(Switzerland) Bastien Dayer (2)
2014–15	(Germany) Tobias Müller (2)	(France) Philippe Lau (4)	(Switzerland) Bastien Dayer (3)
2015–16	(France) Philippe Lau (3)	(Germany) Tobias Müller (2)	(Switzerland) Nicolas Michel
2016–17	(Germany) Tobias Müller (3)	(Norway) Trym Nygaard Løken	(Switzerland) Bastien Dayer (4)
2017–18	(Switzerland) Nicolas Michel	(Norway) Trym Nygaard Løken (2)	(France) Philippe Lau
2019	(Norway) Trym Nygaard Løken	(Switzerland) Stefan Matter	(Switzerland) Bastien Dayer (5)
2020	(Switzerland) Stefan Matter	(Switzerland) Bastien Dayer	(Slovenia) Jure Aleš
2021	(Switzerland) Bastien Dayer	(Switzerland) Nicolas Michel	(Norway) Trym Nygaard Løken
2022	(Switzerland) Bastien Dayer (2)	(France) Élie Nabot	(France) Theo Sillon
2023	(Switzerland) Bastien Dayer (3)	(France) Élie Nabot (2)	(Norway) Trym Nygaard Løken (2)
2023–24	(France) Élie Nabot	(France) Noé Claye	(France) Alexis Page
2024–25	(Norway) Trym Nygaard Løken (2)	(Switzerland) Nicolas Michel (2)	(France) Yoann Rostolan
2025-26	(Switzerland) Nicolas Michel	(France) Alexis Page	(France) Charly Petex

Rank	Nation	Gold	Silver	Bronze	Total
1	Norway	11	10	10	31
2	Switzerland	7	6	7	20
3	France	4	7	5	16
4	Germany	3	2	1	6
5	Sweden	2	2	4	8
6	United States	2	0	0	2
7	Finland	0	1	1	2
7	Slovenia	0	1	1	2
Totals (8 entries)		29	29	29	87

=== Women ===
==== Overall ====
Season	Winner	Runner-up	Third
1995			
1996			
1997	(Switzerland) Barbara Albrecht	(Norway) Trude Edvardsen	(France) Huguette Braisaz
1998	(Norway) Hege Johansson	(Switzerland) Marina Branger	(Switzerland) Andrea Walker
1999	(Norway) Hege Johansson (2)	(Switzerland) Andrea Walker	(Switzerland) Mirjam Rubin
2000	(Finland) Pia Raita	(United States) Cody Thompson	(Norway) Toril Sande
2001	(Finland) Pia Raita (2)	(Norway) Line Aas Sandnes	(Switzerland) Mirjam Rubin (2)
2002	(Sweden) Märta Åberg (Norway) Line Aas Sandnes		(Finland) Pia Raita
2003	(France) Amy N'Guyen	(Finland) Pia Raita	(Switzerland) Françoise Matter
2004	(Norway) Line Aas Sandnes (2)	(France) Amy N'Guyen	(Norway) Sigrid Rykhus
2005	(Norway) Sigrid Rykhus	(Sweden) Sandra Hälldahl	(Norway) Katinka Knudsen
2006	(Norway) Katinka Knudsen	(Germany) Astrid Sturm	(Sweden) Ingrid Hellberg
2007	(Norway) Sigrid Rykhus (2)	(Norway) Katinka Knudsen	(Germany) Astrid Sturm
2008	(Norway) Sigrid Rykhus (3)	(Norway) Katinka Knudsen (2)	(Switzerland) Amélie Reymond
2008–09	(Switzerland) Amélie Reymond	(Norway) Katinka Knudsen (3)	(Switzerland) Sandrine Meyer
2010	(Switzerland) Amélie Reymond (2)	(Switzerland) Sandrine Meyer	(Norway) Katinka Knudsen (2)
2011	(Switzerland) Amélie Reymond (3)	(Switzerland) Sandrine Meyer (2)	(Norway) Katinka Knudsen (3)
2012	(Switzerland) Amélie Reymond (4)	(Norway) Sigrid Rykhus	(Norway) Anne Marit Enger
2013	(Norway) Sigrid Rykhus (4)	(Switzerland) Amélie Reymond	(Sweden) Lisa Englund
2013–14	(Switzerland) Amélie Reymond (5)	(Norway) Mathilde Olsen Ilebrekke	(France) Laura Grenier-Soliget
2014–15	(Switzerland) Amélie Reymond (6)	(Norway) Mathilde Olsen Ilebrekke (2)	(Germany) Johanna Holzmann
2015–16	(Switzerland) Amélie Reymond (7)	(Norway) Mathilde Olsen Ilebrekke (3)	(Germany) Johanna Holzmann (2)
2016–17	(Switzerland) Amélie Reymond (8)	(Norway) Mathilde Olsen Ilebrekke (4)	(Switzerland) Beatrice Zimmermann
2017–18	(Germany) Johanna Holzmann	(France) Argeline Tan-Bouquet	(Switzerland) Beatrice Zimmermann (2)
2019	(Switzerland) Amélie Reymond (9)	(Germany) Johanna Holzmann	(United Kingdom) Jasmin Taylor
2020	(Switzerland) Amélie Wenger-Reymond (10)	(Germany) Johanna Holzmann (2)	(France) Argeline Tan-Bouquet
2021	(Switzerland) Amélie Wenger-Reymond (11)	(Switzerland) Martina Wyss	(Switzerland) Beatrice Zimmermann (3)
2022	(Switzerland) Martina Wyss	(United Kingdom) Jasmin Taylor	(France) Argeline Tan-Bouquet (2)
2023	(Switzerland) Martina Wyss (2)	(Switzerland) Amélie Wenger-Reymond (2)	(France) Argeline Tan-Bouquet (3)
2023–24	(United Kingdom) Jasmin Taylor	(Norway) Gøril Strøm Eriksen	(France) Laly Chaucheprat
2024–25	(United Kingdom) Jasmin Taylor (2)	(France) Argeline Tan-Bouquet (2)	(France) Augustine Carliez
2025-26	(Norway) Gøril Strøm Eriksen	(United Kingdom) Jasmin Taylor	(France) Camille Bourbon

Rank	Nation	Gold	Silver	Bronze	Total
1	Switzerland	14	7	9	30
2	Norway	9	11	6	26
3	Finland	2	1	1	4
3	Great Britain	2	1	1	4
5	France	1	3	7	11
6	Germany	1	3	3	7
7	Sweden	1	1	2	4
8	United States	0	1	0	1
Totals (8 entries)		30	28	29	87

== Men's general statistics ==
After Parallel Sprint in Thyon. (29 March 2025)

=== Wins ===
Rank	Athlete	Wins
1	(France) Philippe Lau	58
2	(Switzerland) Bastien Dayer	46
2	(Germany) Tobias Müller	46
4	(Norway) Eirik Rykhus	35
4	(Norway) Trym Nygaard Løken	35
6	(Norway) Børge Søvik	29
7	(Switzerland) Nicolas Michel	15
8	(Sweden) Matthias Wagenius	13
9	(France) Élie Nabot	9
9	(Switzerland) Stefan Matter	9

=== Podiums ===
Rank	Athlete	Podiums
1	(France) Philippe Lau	114
2	(Switzerland) Bastien Dayer	111
3	(Norway) Trym Nygaard Løken	84
4	(Germany) Tobias Müller	81
5	(Norway) Eirik Rykhus	75
6	(Switzerland) Nicolas Michel	72
7	(Norway) Børge Søvik	49
8	(Sweden) Matthias Wagenius	47
9	(France) Élie Nabot	37
10	(Switzerland) Stefan Matter	34

=== Top 10s ===
Rank	Athlete	Top 10s
1	(Switzerland) Bastien Dayer	231
2	(France) Philippe Lau	191
3	(Switzerland) Nicolas Michel	163
4	(Norway) Trym Nygaard Løken	159
5	(France) Chris Lau	118
6	(Sweden) Olle Collberg	115
7	(France) Antoine Bouvier	110
8	(Sweden) Matthias Wagenius	107
8	(Germany) Tobias Müller	107
10	(France) Élie Nabot	103

== Women's general statistics ==
After Parallel Sprint in Thyon. (29 March 2025)

=== Wins ===
Rank	Athlete	Wins
1	(Switzerland) Amélie Wenger-Reymond	164
2	(Norway) Sigrid Rykhus	44
3	(Switzerland) Martina Wyss	24
4	(Norway) Katinka Knudsen	20
5	(United Kingdom) Jasmin Taylor	18
6	(Germany) Johanna Holzmann	13
6	(France) Argeline Tan-Bouquet	13
8	(Norway) Line Aas Sandnes	9
9	(Norway) Kaja Bjørnstad Konow	7
10	(Germany) Astrid Sturm	6
10	(Norway) Gøril Strøm Eriksen	6

=== Podiums ===
Rank	Athlete	Podiums
1	(Switzerland) Amélie Wenger-Reymond	216
2	(Norway) Sigrid Rykhus	88
3	(France) Argeline Tan-Bouquet	73
4	(Norway) Katinka Knudsen	69
5	(United Kingdom) Jasmin Taylor	68
6	(Germany) Johanna Holzmann	63
7	(Norway) Mathilde Olsen Ilebrekke	57
8	(Switzerland) Beatrice Zimmermann	53
9	(Switzerland) Martina Wyss	42
9	(Switzerland) Sandrine Meyer	42

=== Top 10s ===
Rank	Athlete	Top 10s
1	(Switzerland) Amélie Wenger-Reymond	222
2	(France) Argeline Tan-Bouquet	190
3	(United Kingdom) Jasmin Taylor	188
4	(Switzerland) Beatrice Zimmermann	138
5	(Germany) Johanna Holzmann	130
6	(Norway) Katinka Knudsen	113
7	(Norway) Sigrid Rykhus	99
8	(Norway) Mathilde Olsen Ilebrekke	94
8	(Switzerland) Simone Oehrli	94
10	(Norway) Anne Marit Enger	92
10	(Norway) Gøril Strøm Eriksen	92

== See also ==
- Telemark World Championships
- Telemark Junior World Championships
