= Charlotte Guest =

Charlotte Guest may refer to:

- Lady Charlotte Guest (1812–1895), English aristocrat and businesswoman
- Charlie Guest (born 1993), British alpine skier
