= University of Suffolk =

Public university in Suffolk and Norfolk, England

Coordinates: 52.0525°N 1.1635°E

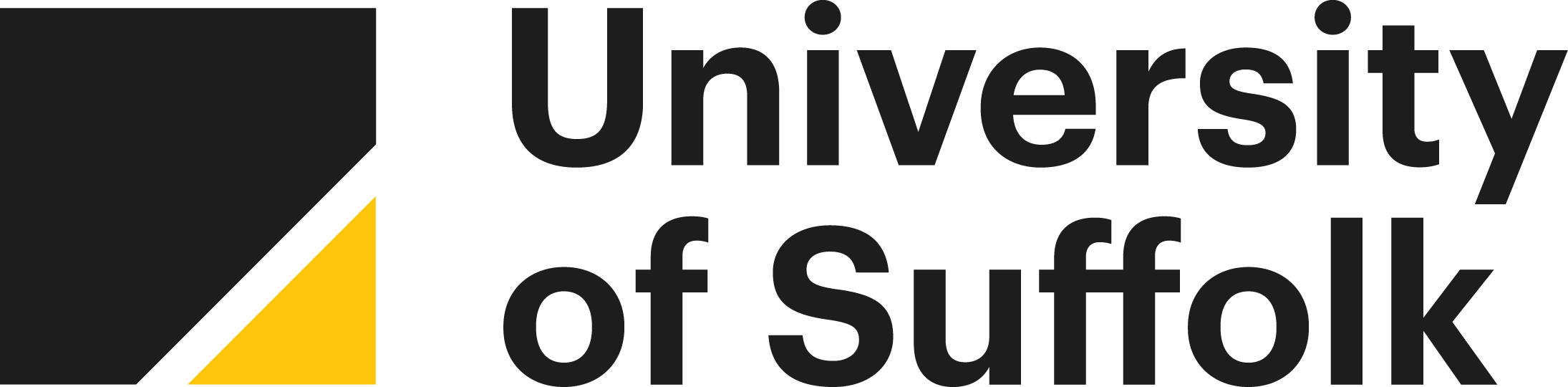
- Type: Public
- Established: 2007 – University Campus Suffolk; 2016 – renamed to University of Suffolk after gaining independence
- Academic affiliations: East Coast College; Suffolk New College; Universities UK
- Chancellor: Zeb Soanes
- Vice-Chancellor: Jenny Higham
- Students: 13,590 (2024/25)
- Undergraduates: 12,600 (2024/25)
- Postgraduates: 990 (2024/25)
- Location: Ipswich, and other campuses serving foundation courses around Suffolk and in Norfolk, England, United Kingdom
- Colours: Grey & gold
- Website: uos.ac.uk

The University of Suffolk is a public university situated in Suffolk and Norfolk, England. The university was established in 2007 as University Campus Suffolk (UCS), founded as a collaboration between the University of East Anglia and the University of Essex. The university's current name was adopted after it was granted independence in 2016 by the Privy Council and was awarded university status.

The University of Suffolk is situated over three locations; a central hub in Ipswich and Academic Partner Colleges located in Lowestoft and Great Yarmouth (the latter in Norfolk). The university operates two "Schools" and in 2024/25 had 13,590 students.

The first chancellor was Helen Pankhurst, great-granddaughter of Emmeline Pankhurst, who is a scholar and writer.

On 8 September 2025, it was announced that Helen Pankhurst will be succeeded by Zeb Soanes, journalist, broadcaster, author and actor who hosts the weekday evening music show Relaxing Evenings with Zeb Soanes on Classic FM. Soanes, who was born and brought up in Suffolk, was awarded an Honorary degree by the university in 2023 and officially took over as Chancellor on 22 October 2025.

The university was named "University of the Year" in the 2025 WhatUni Student Choice Awards.

== History ==
In 2003 Suffolk County Council established a stakeholder group to investigate the possibility of establishing a university in the county. Suffolk was the largest English county that did not host a university. The group included representatives from the University of East Anglia, the University of Essex, West Suffolk College, the East of England Development Agency, the Higher Education Funding Council for England, Suffolk Learning and Skills Council, Suffolk County Council, Ipswich Borough Council, Suffolk Chief Executive's Group and the Suffolk Development Agency.

Following funding pledges from Ipswich Borough Council and Suffolk County Council in 2004, the plan was backed by the Higher Education Funding Council for England (HEFCE) with £15 million worth of funding in 2005 and attracted a £12.5 million grant from the East of England Development Agency in 2006. The institution was officially launched under the name "University Campus Suffolk" on 1 August 2007 and welcomed its first students in September of the same year.

In 2009 the former Suffolk College was split into Suffolk New College, dealing with further education, and University Campus Suffolk dealing with higher education courses.

Because UCS did not have degree-awarding powers, its students received their degrees from either the University of East Anglia or the University of Essex via a cooperative agreement. The institution was later granted degree-awarding powers by the Quality Assurance Agency for Higher Education in November 2015, and in May 2016 it was awarded university status by the Privy Council. As a consequence, UCS was renamed The University of Suffolk in August 2016 and began awarding degrees in its own right.

== Campus ==
Suffolk's main hub is located in Ipswich on the historical Ipswich Waterfront, a ten-minute walk from Ipswich town centre. The Ipswich campus is spread across a compact area on the Waterfront with various university buildings.

=== Waterfront Building ===
The principal University building is known as the Waterfront Building and was designed by RMJM Architects. The Waterfront Building was opened in September 2008 and cost £35 million to build. The building has six floors and contains: two main lecture theatres each seating 180 people, large lecture theatres with a capacity of 120 to 140 seated, medium lecture theatres with a capacity of 60 to 100 seated, and smaller conference rooms with a capacity of six to 18 seated. The ground floor of the building is home to Paddy & Scott's Café, an exhibition space, the main Waterfront Reception and the Student Centre, a one-stop-shop, giving current and potential students information and advice on all aspects of student life including course advice and how to apply. In March 2026, a new library and refurbished study areas were opened. The includes a refreshed book collection with more space for sub-collections including poetry and local history as well as an extensive digital library. Students will also benefit from a new sensory room; a quiet space to regulate away from screens and learning environments.

=== James Hehir Building ===
The James Hehir Building is a six-storey, 4013m building that is a few minutes' walk from the main Waterfront Building. This building is home to specialist teaching facilities, as well as general teaching and study space. It is named after the former chief executive of Ipswich Borough Council. The University of Suffolk Community Interest Company (CIC) has also been based in the building since 2024.

=== Health and Wellbeing Building ===
The Health and Wellbeing Building opened in 2022 and offers students access to an array of clinical simulation amenities. The building is also home to the Institute of Health and Wellbeing Research and the clinical unit where the university's strategic partners, Suffolk MIND and Allied Health Professionals Suffolk, provide their services to the community.

=== Arts Building ===
The Arts Building is the base for art and design courses and also features an exhibition space.

=== The Atrium ===
Refurbishment of the West Building created The Atrium, which opened in September 2016. The Atrium is the headquarters of the Business Solutions Centre and Suffolk Chamber of Commerce.

=== Long Street ===
The building underwent a £1.65 million renovation project in 2025 and is now home to the new Esports course. Facilities include more than 40 gaming-spec PCs, professional-grade broadcast gallery and a live studio purpose-built for broadcasting and live-streaming.

=== The Hold ===
The Hold is the heritage facility for Suffolk located on the Ipswich campus. It is a partnership between Suffolk County Council, Suffolk Archives and the University of Suffolk. It has received funding from the National Lottery Heritage Fund, other national organisations, and local Suffolk heritage groups. The Hold opened in September 2020 and provides facilities to the university, including a lecture hall.

=== DigiTech Centre ===
The DigiTech Centre at Adastral Park is a partnership between the University of Suffolk and BT Group, funded by a £9.6 million investment by the New Anglia Local Enterprise Partnership. DigiTech serves as a base for the University's Suffolk Sustainability Institute and is home to two flagship facilities that support pioneering research, innovation and collaboration: The Smart House and the Quantum Optics Discovery (QOD) Lab.

== Partnerships ==
=== Academic partnerships ===
The university has established a number of partnerships both in the UK and internationally. The university works in partnership with two local Further Education Colleges located in the region to offer the opportunity for students to study at their local college and obtain a recognised University of Suffolk award; the University of Suffolk at Suffolk New College located next to the main University campus in Ipswich, and the University of Suffolk at East Coast College located in Lowestoft and Great Yarmouth. Other partners include Global Banking School, Hanbridge Institute, Initial Teacher Training, LD Training Services Limited, London School of Commerce, Rushmore Business School and Unicaf.

=== Other partnerships ===
The university has a transformative role in the Ipswich and Suffolk community, working with partners to enhance economic, social and cultural growth as part of its Civic University pledge. It also has partnerships with Ipswich Town Football Club and the Ipswich-based Brighten the Corners music festival.

The University of Suffolk Dental Community Interest Company (CIC) is an innovative collaboration between the University of Suffolk and the Suffolk and Northeast Essex Integrated Care Board. The partnership seeks to provide high-quality NHS dental services and experiences to the population of Suffolk and Northeast Essex and supporting dental workforce training and education. The Dental CIC won an East of England regional award in the NHS Parliamentary Awards 2024, and was shortlisted for the national finals.

== Organisation and administration ==
=== Faculties and departments ===
The university is split into two "Schools", each facilitating various courses.

- School of Health, Sciences and Society
- School of Business, Arts, Social Sciences and Technology

=== Research Institutes and Centres ===
The university has six research institutes and centres:

- Centre for Culture and Heritage
- Centre for Excellence in Learning and Teaching
- Digital Futures Institute
- Institute of Health and Wellbeing
- Institute for Social Justice and Crime
- Suffolk Sustainability Institute

=== Sustainability ===
The university was named Green Business of the Year 2023 in the Suffolk County Council Greenest County Awards.

Figures released in June 2023 by the Higher Education Statistics Agency revealed that the university achieved a 64 per cent decrease in Scope 1 and 2 carbon emissions between 2015-2016 and 2021-2022 – the biggest decrease out of 119 universities for which there was data every year.

The university was placed within the top ten UK universities for waste and recycling achievements (People and Planet, 2022).

== Academic profile ==
Rankings
National rankings
- Complete (2027): 44
- Guardian (2027): 115
- Times / Sunday Times (2027): 118

The university won three awards at the WhatUni Student Choice Awards 2025, including being named University of the Year. The university also won in the "Lecturers and Teaching Quality" and "Student Support" categories, and silver overall for "Facilities", "International" and "Postgraduate".

In the Complete University Rankings and League Table 2026, the university was ranked 55th out of 130 UK universities; a rise of 71 places from 2022 to 2026.

The university was the first recipient of the Community University of the Year award by The Mail University Guide in 2024.

== Student life ==
=== Accommodation ===
The on-campus halls of residence, Athena Hall, is located on the Ipswich Waterfront and houses up to 590 students.

=== Students' Union ===
The Students' Union (SU) was formed on 1 August 2007, the same day the university was officially launched. It is a student-led organisation, with two SU Presidents who are full-time officers elected by the student population each year. Part-time officers, represent different parts of the university and different groups of students. Career staff facilitate services, including advice, student societies and sport, elections and representation, events, communications and the running of Shop SU.

The Presidents are elected every February from candidates from the student body; they take office for 12 months from July to July, overseeing the totality of one academic year. There is a current two-year maximum term for the positions. For 2026-2027 the President of Education will be Grace Pearson and the President of Activities and Wellbeing will be Zoe Saunders.

== Notable alumni ==
- Jasmin Taylor – British telemark skier
