= Jasmin Taylor =

British telemark skier (born 1993)

Personal information
- Nickname: Jaz
- Born: 22 August 1993 (age 32) Colchester, Essex, England
- Education: University of Suffolk
- Years active: 2011–

Sport
- Sport: Telemark skiing

Achievements and titles
- World finals: 2015, 2017, 2023
Medal record
Representing Great Britain
Event	1st	2nd	3rd
Telemark World Cup	12	17	27
World Telemarking Championships	0	1	3
Total	12	18	30
World Telemarking Championships
Bronze medal – third place	2015 Steamboat Springs	Telemark
Bronze medal – third place	2017 La Plagne	Telemark
Silver medal – second place	2023 Mürren	Parallel sprint
Bronze medal – third place	2023 Mürren	Classic

Jasmin Taylor (born 22 August 1993) is a British telemark skier, who holds the record for the British skier with the most World Cup and World Championships medals. She won medals at the 2015, 2017 and 2023 World Telemarking Championships.

== Career ==
As a child, Taylor was an alpine skier. She started out on a dry ski slope in Ipswich, England. She took up telemark skiing at the age of 15, after being invited to train in Les Houches, France, by the British Ski Academy. She is now based in Les Houches, France during the winter ski season, and has trained in Hemel Hempstead, England during the summer season.

In 2011, Taylor competed at the World Youth Telemarking World Championships in Norway. In 2012, she made £2,000 from selling items at a car boot sale, which allowed her to compete at that year's British Championships. She won the event. She is now a five time British champion. In 2013, Taylor won her first Telemarking World Cup medal; it was also the first medal for a Briton in the Telemark World Cup. In 2015, she won her first bronze medal at the World Telemarking Championships; it was Britain's first ever medal at the championships. In 2016, she competed in the telemark demonstration event at the 2016 Winter Youth Olympics.

In the 2016–17 season, Taylor won six World Cup medals, and finished fourth in the World Cup overall standing. She also won a bronze medal at the 2017 World Telemarking Championships. In the 2017–18 season, she won her first World Cup event, in Suicide Six, Vermont, US. She also won a World Cup event in Sugarbush, Vermont, US a few days later. In 2019, Taylor won the telemarking event in Pralognan-la-Vanoise, her fifth career World Cup victory.

In January 2020, Taylor overtook Jilly Curry to become the British skier with the most World Cup and World Championships medals, after winning her 30th World Cup medal in Pralognan-la-Vanoise, France. During the 2020–21 season, Taylor trained in Switzerland, as French ski lifts were closed due to the COVID-19 pandemic.

At the 2022 Telemark Skiing World Cup, Taylor came first and second in the two events in Les Houches, France. At the World Cup event in Mürren, Switzerland, she won the parallel sprint competition and came second in the classic and sprint events. She finished in the top three in nine World Cup events, including seven consecutive competitions. She finished the season second overall. At the 2023 World Telemarking Championships, she came second in the parallel sprint event, and third in the classic event.

Taylor won the parallel sprint and overall World Cup titles in 2024, finishing the season ranked as world number one after 11 podium finishes including five firsts.

== Personal life ==
Taylor was born in Colchester, England, and grew up in Ipswich, England. Aside from skiing, Taylor works as a professional fitness coach, and a gym instructor. She studied sports science at the University of Suffolk.
