= Daumberg =

Coordinates: 49°31′12″N 8°45′44″E

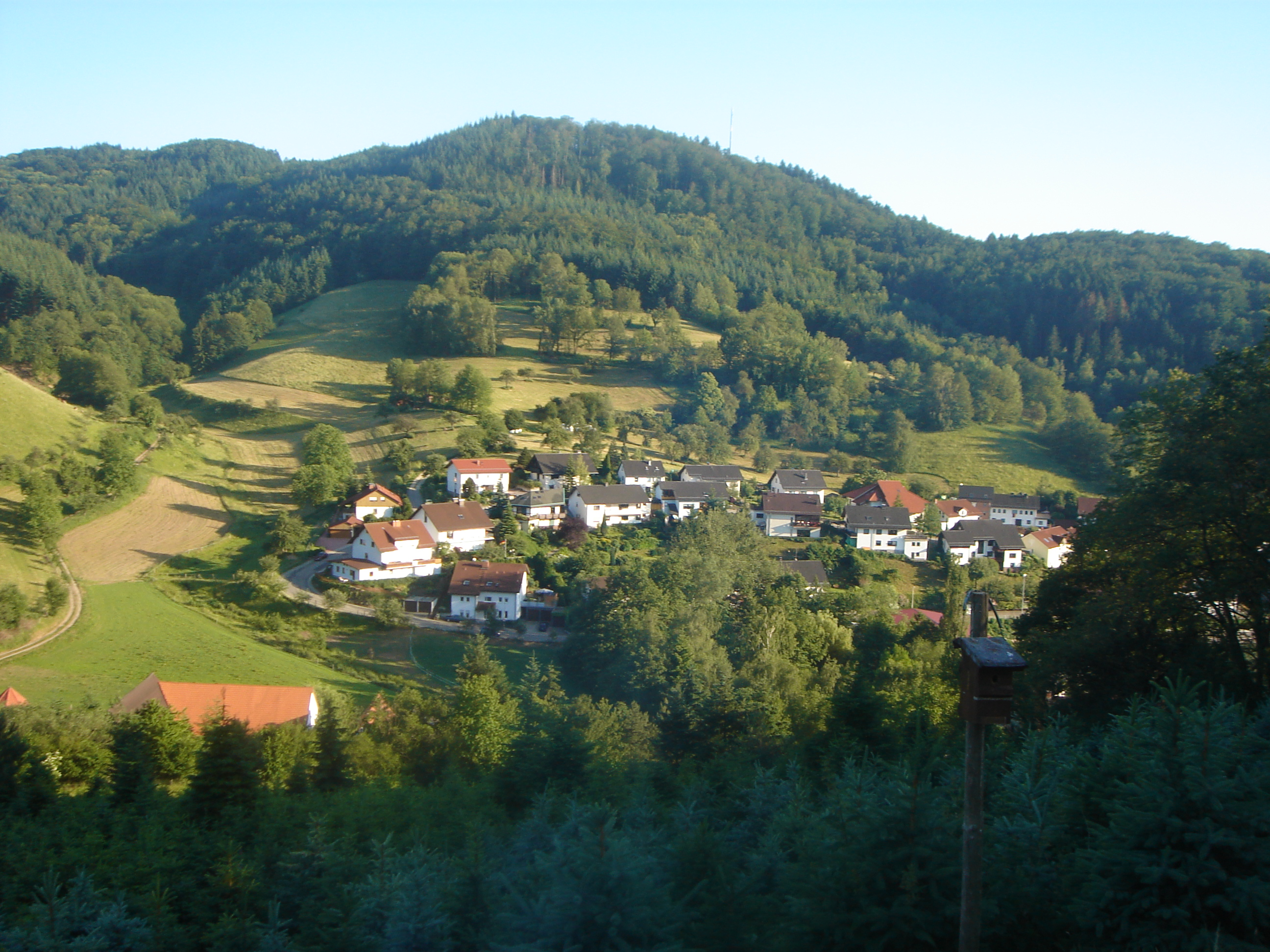
- The Daumberg mountain in Gorxheimertal

Highest point
- Elevation: 462 m (1,516 ft)

Geography
- Location: Hesse, Germany

The Daumberg is an extinct volcano in the Odenwald mountain range with an altitude of 462 m (1,516 ft). The hill lies south of the district of Trösel in the municipality of Gorxheimtal near the border to Wünsch-Michelbach and thus on the border between Hesse and Baden-Württemberg.

On the Daumberg, many Christmas trees are cultivated in several plantations. The northern slope of the mountain is used for snow skiing in the winter and in the summer. In addition, there have also been grass skiing championships held there.
