= International Ski and Snowboard Federation =

International sports governing body

- Fédération Internationale de Ski et de Snowboard
- Sport: Skiing and Snowboarding
- Jurisdiction: International
- Membership: 137 members
- Abbreviation: FIS
- Founded: 2 February 1924; 102 years ago in Chamonix, France
- Affiliation: IOC
- Headquarters: Marc Hodler House; Blochstrasse 2 Oberhofen am Thunersee, Switzerland
- President: (Liechtenstein) Alexander Ospelt
- Vice presidents: (Canada) Deidra Dionne; (United Kingdom) Victoria Gosling; (United States) Dexter Paine; (Finland) Martti Uusitalo
- Secretary: (France) Michel Vion
- Operating income: ▲CHF 31.3 million (2023)

Official website
- fis-ski.com
- Official languages: English, French, German and Russian

The International Ski and Snowboard Federation (French: Fédération Internationale de Ski et de Snowboard, FIS) is the highest international governing body for skiing and snowboarding. It was previously known as the International Ski Federation (French: Fédération Internationale de Ski) until 26 May 2022 when the name was changed to include snowboard.

Founded on 2 February 1924 in Chamonix, France during the inaugural Winter Olympic Games, FIS is responsible for the Olympic skiing disciplines, namely Alpine skiing, cross-country skiing, ski jumping, Nordic combined, freestyle skiing, and snowboarding. The FIS is also responsible for setting the international competition rules. The organization has a membership of 132 national ski associations, and is based in Oberhofen am Thunersee, Switzerland.

== Most World Cup wins ==
Athletes with at least 50 event wins in any of the FIS World Cups:

Active

Rank		Wins	Discipline	Code
1	(Switzerland) Amélie Wenger-Reymond	164	Telemark skiing	TM
2	(Norway) Marit Bjørgen	114	Cross-country skiing	CC
3	(United States) Mikaela Shiffrin	110	Alpine skiing	AL
4	(Switzerland) Conny Kissling	106	Freestyle skiing	FS
5	(Canada) Mikaël Kingsbury	87	Freestyle skiing	FS
6	(Sweden) Ingemar Stenmark	86	Alpine skiing	AL
7	(United States) Lindsey Vonn	82	Alpine skiing	AL
	(Norway) Therese Johaug	82	Cross-country skiing	CC
9	(Norway) Johannes Høsflot Klæbo	74	Cross-country skiing	CC
10	(France) Karine Ruby	67	Snowboarding	SB
	(Austria) Marcel Hirscher	67	Alpine skiing	AL
	(Norway) Jarl Magnus Riiber	67	Nordic combined	NK
13	(Japan) Sara Takanashi	63	Ski jumping	JP
14	(Austria) Annemarie Moser-Pröll	62	Alpine skiing	AL
15	(France) Phillipe Lau	58	Telemark skiing	TM
	(Italy) Simone Origone	58	Speed skiing	SS
17	(United States) Jan Bucher	57	Freestyle skiing	FS
	(Czech Republic) Jan Němec	57	Grass skiing	GS
19	(Switzerland) Vreni Schneider	55	Alpine skiing	AL
20	(Austria) Hermann Maier	54	Alpine skiing	AL
21	(Austria) Gregor Schlierenzauer	53	Ski jumping	JP
	(Italy) Edoardo Frau	53	Grass skiing	GS
23	(Italy) Alberto Tomba	50	Alpine skiing	AL
	(Poland) Justyna Kowalczyk	50	Cross-country skiing	CC

Updated as of 3 February 2024

== Ski disciplines ==
The federation organises the following ski sport disciplines, for which it oversees the FIS Games as well as World Cup competitions and World Championships:

Alpine skiing
Disciplines	World Cup	World Championships	Olympics
Alpine combined	FIS Alpine Ski World Cup	FIS Alpine World Ski Championships	Yes
Downhill	FIS Alpine Ski World Cup	FIS Alpine World Ski Championships	Yes
Super-G	FIS Alpine Ski World Cup	FIS Alpine World Ski Championships	Yes
Giant slalom	FIS Alpine Ski World Cup	FIS Alpine World Ski Championships	Yes
Slalom	FIS Alpine Ski World Cup	FIS Alpine World Ski Championships	Yes

Nordic skiing
Disciplines	World Cup	World Championships	Olympics
Cross-country skiing	FIS Cross Country World Cup	FIS Nordic World Ski Championships	Yes
Ski jumping	FIS Ski Jumping World Cup	FIS Nordic World Ski Championships	Yes
Nordic combined	FIS Nordic Combined World Cup	FIS Nordic World Ski Championships	Yes
Ski flying	FIS Ski Flying World Cup	FIS Ski Flying World Championships	No

Freestyle skiing
Disciplines	World Cup	World Championships	Olympics
Moguls	FIS Freestyle Ski World Cup	FIS Freestyle World Ski Championships	Yes
Dual moguls	FIS Freestyle Ski World Cup	FIS Freestyle World Ski Championships	Yes
Aerials	FIS Freestyle Ski World Cup	FIS Freestyle World Ski Championships	Yes
Ski Cross	FIS Freestyle Ski World Cup	FIS Freestyle World Ski Championships	Yes
Halfpipe	FIS Freestyle Ski World Cup	FIS Freestyle World Ski Championships	Yes
Big air	FIS Freestyle Ski World Cup	FIS Freestyle World Ski Championships	Yes

Snowboarding
Disciplines	World Cup	World Championships	Olympics
Parallel giant slalom	FIS Snowboard World Cup	FIS Snowboarding World Championships	Yes
Parallel slalom	FIS Snowboard World Cup	FIS Snowboarding World Championships	Yes
Big air	FIS Snowboard World Cup	FIS Snowboarding World Championships	Yes
Slopestyle	FIS Snowboard World Cup	FIS Snowboarding World Championships	Yes
Snowboard cross	FIS Snowboard World Cup	FIS Snowboarding World Championships	Yes
Halfpipe	FIS Snowboard World Cup	FIS Snowboarding World Championships	Yes

Freeride
Disciplines	World Cup	World Championships	Olympics
Freeride skiing	Freeride World Tour	FIS Freeride World Championships	No
Freeride snowboarding	Freeride World Tour	FIS Freeride World Championships	No

Telemark
Disciplines	World Cup	World Championships	Olympics
Sprint	FIS Telemark World Cup	FIS Telemark World Championships	No
Classic	FIS Telemark World Cup	FIS Telemark World Championships	No
Parallel sprint	FIS Telemark World Cup	FIS Telemark World Championships	No
Team parallel sprint	FIS Telemark World Cup	FIS Telemark World Championships	No

Para
Disciplines	World Championships
Para alpine skiing	FIS Para Alpine World Championships
Para cross-country skiing	FIS Para Cross-Country World Championships
Para snowboard	FIS Para Snowboard World Championships

Others
Disciplines	World Championships
Grass skiing	FIS sprint slalom, giant slalom, super combined, super-G, parallel slalom – World Cup (s)
Speed skiing	FIS speed skiing championships
Masters	FIS World Criterium Masters (amateur, senior)
Roller skiing	(amateur, senior)

== FIS Congress history ==
=== Founding and the first years ===
After ski club federations and national associations were created in Norway (1883 and 1908), Russia (1896), Bohemia and Great Britain (1903), Switzerland (1904), United States, Austria and Germany (all in 1905) and Sweden, Finland and Italy (all in 1908), and competitions had begun such as the Nordic Games, early international cross-country races (Adelboden, 1903), international participation at Holmenkollen (1903) and Club Alpin Français (CAF) International Winter Sports Weeks, an international Ski Congress was convened to develop standard rules for international competitive skiing.

The founding of a predecessor association, the International Ski Commission (CIS), was decided on 18 February 1910, in Christiania, Norway by delegates from ten countries to the first International Ski Congress. This Congress then met every year or so to hear from the CIS and refine and adopt rule changes. The commission was to consist of two members - a representative of Scandinavia and Central Europe. Ultimately, two Scandinavians sat on the commission. A year later, in March 1911, the first internationally valid set of rules was approved. At that time, the commission was enlarged to five members, and Oslo was elected as headquarters.

In 1913, the number of members of the commission was increased to seven: two Norwegians, two Swedes, a Swiss, a German and an Austrian.

On 2 February 1924, in Chamonix as part of the "International Winter Sports Week", which was later to be recognized as the first Olympic Winter Games, 36 delegates from 14 countries (Great Britain, Austria, Czechoslovakia, Finland, France, Yugoslavia, Norway, Poland, Romania, US, Switzerland, Sweden, Hungary and Italy) decided to found the FIS, which replaced the CIS.

Initially, the FIS was only responsible for Nordic skiing. FIS Nordic World Ski Championships 1925 in Janské Lázně, Czechoslovakia, were given status as the first official World Championships. After the Scandinavian countries had relented, it was decided at the 11th FIS Congress ( 24–26 February 1930 in Oslo) to also include alpine skiing (downhill, slalom and alpine combined) in the rules. This was upon a proposal by Great Britain, in which the British ski pioneer Arnold Lunn played a major role as co-founder of the Arlberg-Kandahar races. The simple sentence "Downhill and slalom races may be organized" was written into the rules - a sentence that was to change skiing in the long term. The first FIS Alpine World Ski Championships were held 19–23 February 1931 in Mürren, Switzerland.

Ski flying, a variation of ski jumping, was recognized as a discipline in 1938, but rules were not finalized until after World War II.

=== List of Ski Congresses ===
- 1910 – Christiania (I)
- 1911 – Stockholm (II)
- 1912 – Munich (III)
- 1913 – Bern/Interlaken (IV)
- 1914 – Christiania (V)
- 1922 – Stockholm (VI)
- 1923 – Prague (VII)
- 1924 – Chamonix (VIII)
- 1926 – Lahti (IX)
- 1928 – St. Moritz (X)
- 1930 – Oslo (XI)
- 1932 – Paris (XII)
- 1934 – Sollefteå (XIII)
- 1936 – Garmisch-Partenkirchen (XIV)
- 1938 – Helsinki (XV)
- 1946 – Pau (XVI)
- 1949 – Oslo (XVII)
- 1951 – Venice (XVIII)
- 1953 – Igls (XIX)
- 1955 – Montreux (XX)
- 1957 – Dubrovnik (XXI)
- 1959 – Stockholm (XXII)
- 1961 – Madrid (XXIII)
- 1963 – Athens (XXIV)
- 1965 – Mamaia (XXV)
- 1967 – Beirut (XVI)
- 1968 – Barcelona (XVII)
- 1971 – Opatija (XVIII)
- 1973 – Nicosie (XIX)
- 1975 – San Francisco (XXX)
- 1977 – Bariloche (XXXI)
- 1979 – Nice (XXXII)
- 1981 – Puerto de la Cruz (XXXIII)
- 1983 – Sydney (XXXIV)
- 1985 – Vancouver (XXXV)
- 1988 – Istanbul (XXXVI)
- 1990 – Montreux (XXXVII)
- 1992 – Budapest (XXXVIII)
- 1994 – Rio de Janeiro (XXXIX)
- 1996 – Christchurch (XL)
- 1998 – Prague (XLI)
- 2000 – Melbourne (XLII)
- 2002 – Portorož (XLIII)
- 2004 – Miami (XLIV)
- 2006 – Vilamoura (XLV)
- 2008 – Cape Town (XLVI)
- 2010 – Antalya (XLVII)
- 2012 – Kangwonland (XLVIII)
- 2014 – Barcelona (XLIX)
- 2016 – Cancún (L)
- 2018 – Costa Navarino (LI)
- 2021 – Online (LII)
- 2022 – Vilamoura (LIII)

== Presidents ==
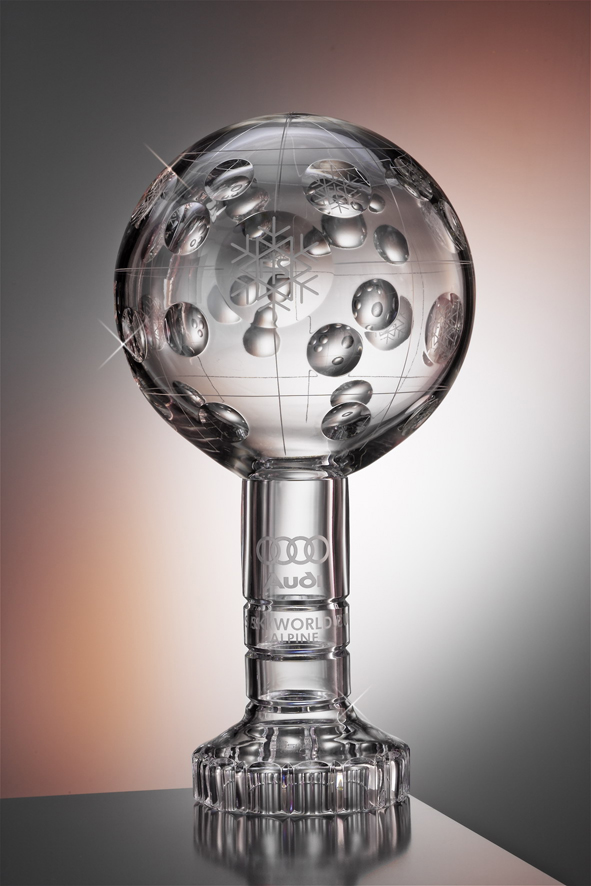
The Crystal Globe trophy awarded by the FIS to the winner of the Alpine Ski World Cup. Similar trophies are awarded in all FIS world cups.

#	Name	Nationality	Term
1.	Ivar Holmquist	Sweden	1924–1934
2.	Nicolai Ramm Østgaard	Norway	1934–1951
3.	Marc Hodler	Switzerland	1951–1998
4.	Gian Franco Kasper	Switzerland	1998–2021
5.	Johan Eliasch	Great Britain; Sweden	2021–2026
6.	Alexander Ospelt	Liechtenstein	2026–present

== Members ==
- Albania
- Algeria
- American Samoa
- Andorra
- Argentina
- Armenia
- Australia
- Austria
- Azerbaijan
- Bahamas
- Barbados
- Belarus
- Belgium
- Benin
- Bhutan
- Bermuda
- Bolivia
- Bosnia and Herzegovina
- Brazil
- British Virgin Islands
- Bulgaria
- Cameroon
- Canada
- Cayman Islands
- Chile
- China
- Colombia
- Costa Rica
- Croatia
- Cyprus
- Czech Republic
- Democratic People's Republic of Korea
- Denmark
- Dominica
- Ecuador
- Egypt
- El Salvador
- Eritrea
- Estonia
- Eswatini
- Ethiopia
- Fiji
- Finland
- France
- Georgia
- Germany
- Ghana
- Great Britain
- Guinea-Bissau
- Greece
- Grenada
- Guatemala
- Guyana
- Haiti
- Honduras
- Hong Kong
- Hungary
- Iceland
- Indonesia
- India
- Iran
- Ireland
- Israel
- Italy
- Jamaica
- Japan
- Kazakhstan
- Kenya
- Republic of Korea
- Kosovo
- Kuwait
- Kyrgyzstan
- Latvia
- Lebanon
- Lesotho
- Liechtenstein
- Lithuania
- Luxembourg
- Macau
- North Macedonia
- Madagascar
- Malaysia
- Malta
- Morocco
- Mexico
- Moldova
- Monaco
- Mongolia
- Montenegro
- Nepal
- Netherlands
- New Zealand
- Norway
- Pakistan
- Panama
- Palestine
- Paraguay
- Peru
- Philippines
- Poland
- Portugal
- Puerto Rico
- Qatar
- Romania
- Russia
- San Marino
- Senegal
- Serbia
- Slovakia
- Slovenia
- South Africa
- Spain
- Sri Lanka
- Sudan
- Sweden
- Switzerland
- Chinese Taipei
- Tajikistan
- Thailand
- Timor-Leste
- Togo
- Tonga
- Trinidad and Tobago
- Turkey
- Ukraine
- United States
- Vanuatu
- United States Virgin Islands
- United Arab Emirates
- Uruguay
- Uzbekistan
- Venezuela
- Zimbabwe

=== Russia and Belarus suspension ===
In reaction to the 2022 Russian invasion of Ukraine, in March 2022 the FIS banned Russian and Belarusian athletes and officials in international competitions.

In October 2025 the FIS decided not to allow them to compete even as Individual Neutral Athletes in qualification events for the 2026 Winter Olympics. Later that year, the Court of Arbitration for Sport (CAS) ruled against this blanket exclusion, and FIS announced it would comply by allowing eligible Russian and Belarusian competitors to take part in Olympic qualifying races under neutral status.

== Official FIS ski museums ==
As of 2017, there are 31 official FIS Ski Museums worldwide in 13 countries which are devoted to the history of skiing, taking into account the region's own history of skiing and tourism.

=== List of FIS ski museums ===
- FIS Skimuseum Damüls, Vorarlberg (Austria)
- FIS-Winter!Sport!Museum! Mürzzuschlag (Austria)
- FIS-Landes-Skimuseum Werfenweng (Austria)
- FIS-Ski-Museum Vaduz (Liechtenstein)

== See also ==
- Alpine Skiing Europa Cup
- FIS Alpine Ski World Cup
- FIS Cross-Country World Cup
- FIS Freestyle Ski World Cup
- FIS Nordic Combined World Cup
- FIS Ski Jumping World Cup
- FIS Snowboard World Cup
- International Snowboard Federation
