= Robin Wallace =

British freestyle skier and coach

Personal information
- National team: Team GB (Great Britain)
- Citizenship: British
- Spouse: Jilly Curry

Sport
- Country: Great Britain
- Sport: Freestyle skiing

Achievements and titles
- Olympic finals: 1988

Robin Wallace is a British former freestyle skier and coach of the Great Britain freestyle skiing team. He finished in the top 10 in over 20 FIS Freestyle Ski World Cup events, and competed in a demonstration event at the 1988 Winter Olympics. Wallace now competes internationally in paragliding, laser run, biathle and triathle.

== Career ==
Wallace took up skiing as a teenager, after a school ski trip. After working on an artificial slope, he joined the Southampton freestyle skiing team. Wallace came second at a junior ski ballet international competition. Wallace competed in the FIS Freestyle Ski World Cup between 1981 and 1989. He finished in the top 10 at 22 events, and was at one time ranked sixth in the world. In 1984, Wallace was involved in a ski dancing and acrobats event at the Earls Court Exhibition Centre. Wallace came sixth in the combined event at the 1986 FIS Freestyle World Ski Championships. Wallace competed in the freestyle skiing demonstration event at the 1988 Winter Olympics. He was considered one of the favourites. Later in the year, he was suffered knee ligament damage during an event at the Earls Court Exhibition Centre, which sidelined him for six weeks. Fellow athlete Mike Whealey suffered a career ending injury at the event.

After retiring, Wallace was the coach of the Great Britain freestyle skiing team for seven years.

Wallace competed in the European Championships in Laser-run in Madeira in 2024. He was part of the 3 man British Team (masters 60+) who won bronze medal in the team event with Charlie Lane and Michael Charlston

In June 2026 Wallace took 1st place (masters 60+) in Triathle at the British National Championships, qualifying for the 2026 World Championships in Madeira.

== Personal life ==
Wallace is from Chandler's Ford, Hampshire, England. Wallace is married to Jilly Curry, whom he also coached. Curry won 29 FIS World Cup medals, including three gold medals. Their son Lloyd competed in the 2018 and 2022 Winter Olympics.
