= Jilly Curry =

British freestyle skier

Personal information
- Full name: Jilly Wallace
- National team: Great Britain
- Citizenship: British
- Years active: 1984–1994
- Spouse: Robin Wallace

Sport
- Country: Great Britain
- Sport: Freestyle skiing, Laser Run
- Coached by: Robin Wallace

Achievements and titles
- Olympic finals: 1992, 1994
Medal record
Representing Great Britain
Event	1st	2nd	3rd
FIS Freestyle Ski World Cup	3	15	11
UIPM World Championships	6	0	0
Total	9	15	11

Jilly Wallace (née Curry) is a British former freestyle skier, who won 29 FIS World Cup medals, which was the most for any British skier or snowboarder until 2020. She competed at the 1992 and 1994 Winter Olympics. She is 6 times World Champion in Laser-Run (2023 individual + mixed team masters + ladies team, 2022 individual + mixed team masters, 2019 Women's Team) at the UIPM World Championships.

== Career ==
Curry competed in freestyle skiing from 1984 to 1994. During her career, she won 29 FIS World Cup medals, including three gold medals. Her medal tally was more than any other British skier or snowboarder in FIS World Cup events, until her record was broken by Jasmin Taylor in 2020. Curry came second at three consecutive 1989–90 FIS Freestyle Ski World Cup events, the last one of which was in Breckenridge, Colorado, US.

Curry came fourth in the aerial skiing demonstration event at the 1992 Winter Olympics in Albertville, France, and also competed at the 1994 Winter Olympics in Lillehammer, Norway. She came 21st out of 23 competitors, and did not qualify for the final.

Since 2019 Curry has competed nationally and internationally in laser run, biathle and triathle, all disciplines of modern pentathlon. As part of the British Team she was 2019 World Champion (Ladies Team), and European Champion (Ladies Team and Mixed Team) in the masters category. She became the double World Champion in masters laser run in 2022 in the individual women's and mixed relay. She won the European Laser Run Championships 2022 in masters individual women's and mixed relay. In 2023 she became triple World Champion at the Laser Run World Championships in Bath, UK.

At the 2023 European Championships for Laser Run and Triathle in Erding, Germany, she won the Laser Run Women’s Masters, Laser Run Mixed Team Masters and Triathle Women’s Masters.

== Personal life ==
Curry is from London. Curry is married to Robin Wallace, who was her coach. Wallace competed for Great Britain in freestyle skiing at the 1988 Winter Olympics in Calgary, Canada. Their son Lloyd competed in the 2018 and 2022 Winter Olympics. Curry's father Peter competed at the 1948 Summer Olympics in the 3000 metres steeplechase.
