= 2007 Telemark World Championships =

International skiing competition

2007 FIS Telemark World Championships
- Location: Thyon, Switzerland
- Date: 21–24 March 2007

The 2007 FIS Telemark World Championships were held from 21 to 24 March 2007 in Thyon, Switzerland.

== Medal summary ==
=== Medal table ===
* Host nation (Switzerland)

Rank	Nation	Gold	Silver	Bronze	Total
1	Norway (NOR)	5	4	1	10
2	Switzerland (SUI)*	1	2	1	4
3	Germany (GER)	0	0	2	2
4	France (FRA)	0	0	1	1
4	Sweden (SWE)	0	0	1	1
Totals (5 entries)		6	6	6	18

=== Men's events ===
Event	Gold		Silver		Bronze	
Sprint	Eirik Rykhus; Norway	2:17.85	Børge Søvik; Norway	2:18.95	Philippe Lau; France	2:21.39
Classic	Eirik Rykhus; Norway	2:27.16	Børge Søvik; Norway	2:29.73	Adriano Iseppi; Switzerland	2:32.05
Giant slalom	Eirik Rykhus; Norway	2:02.12	Børge Søvik; Norway	2:02.54	Per Bylund; Sweden	2:05.37

=== Women's events ===
Event	Gold		Silver		Bronze	
Sprint	Sigrid Rykhus; Norway	2:33.94	Amélie Reymond; Switzerland	2:34.55	Katinka Knudsen; Norway	2:34.94
Classic	Amélie Reymond; Switzerland	2:24.95	Katinka Knudsen; Norway	2:28.71	Astrid Sturm; Germany	2:29.40
Giant slalom	Katinka Knudsen; Norway	2:14.46	Amélie Reymond; Switzerland	2:14.94	Astrid Sturm; Germany	2:16.70
