= Telemark World Championships =

International skiing competition

- Status: active
- Genre: sporting event
- Date: January–March
- Frequency: annual
- Location: various
- Inaugurated: 1987
- Organiser: International Ski Federation

Telemark World Championships is the official event to award the titles of World Champions in telemark skiing. The World Championships is organized every odd year. It started in 1987 in Hemsedal.

== Championships ==
Year	Country	Place
1987	Norway	Hemsedal
1988	France	Saint-Gervais-les-Bains
1989	Austria	St. Anton
1990	United States	Aspen
1991	Sweden	Vemdalen
1992	Switzerland	Engelberg
1993	Italy	Courmayeur
1994	France	La Clusaz
1995	Norway	Hafjell
1996	Canada	Whistler
1997	Switzerland	Meiringen
1999	Sweden	Stöten
2001	France	Val Thorens
2003	United States	Big Mountain
2005	Norway	Beitostølen
2007	Switzerland	Thyon
2009	Austria	Kreischberg/Murau
2011	Norway	Rjukan
2013	Spain	Espot
2015	United States	Steamboat Springs
2017	France	La Plagne/Montchavin-les-Coches
2019	Norway	Rjukan
2021	Switzerland	Melchsee-Frutt
2023	Switzerland	Mürren
2025	France	Les Contamines-Montjoie

== See also ==
- FIS Telemark World Cup
- Telemark Junior World Championships
