= Katie Summerhayes =

British freestyle skier

Personal information
- Born: 8 October 1995 (age 30) Sheffield, England
- Height: 1.71 m (5 ft 7 in)
- Weight: 60 kg (132 lb)

Sport
- Country: Great Britain
Medal record
Women's freestyle skiing
Representing Great Britain
World Championships
Silver medal – second place	2015 Kreischberg	Slopestyle

Katie Summerhayes (born 8 October 1995) is an English freestyle skier. Summerhayes competed at the 2014 Winter Olympics. She has won two medals at FIS World Cup and one medals at FIS World Championships Summerhayes carried the flag at the 2012 Winter Youth Olympics.

She became the first British female skier to win a medal in a World Cup event for 19 years when she finished second in the slopestyle competition in Silvaplana in February 2013. In the 2014 Sochi Winter Olympics, she came 7th in the skiing slopestyle final after qualifying in 3rd. After the Olympics, she won a gold medal in slopestyle at the 2014 Junior World Championships in Valmalenco, Italy. In 2015, she became the first British female competitor to win a World Championship medal in freestyle skiing when she took a silver in the slopestyle event at the Freestyle Ski and Snowboarding World Championships.

Summerhayes initially learned to ski at the Sheffield Ski Village, an artificial ski slope (now closed) with a half-pipe and freestyle area. She also trained with the Sharks Ski Club, of which James Woods was also a member as a youth.
