= Peter Curry =

English lawyer and athlete (1921–2010)

Personal information
- Nationality: British (English)
- Born: 22 July 1921 Murree, Punjab, India
- Died: 25 January 2010 (aged 88)

Sport
- Sport: Athletics
- Events: middle-distance, steeplechase
- Club: University of Oxford AC; Achilles Club

Thomas Peter Ellison Curry QC (22 July 1921 – 25 January 2010) was a prominent English Barrister and athlete. The only man to take silk (becoming King's Counsel) twice, he won triple Blues at Oxford and competed in the 1948 Olympic Games.

== Personal life ==
Curry was born in Muree, Punjab (India at the time), where his father was stationed with the Royal Artillery. He was educated at Tonbridge and Oriel College, Oxford. At Oxford, he read law and graduated with a first, winning Middle Temple's Harmsworth Scholarship.

He married Pamela Joyce Holmes in 1951 and they had four children. He lived most of his married life in Surrey, latterly in the village of Dunsfold near Godalming. Their daughter Jilly was a freestyle skier, who won 29 29 FIS World Cup medals, and competed in a demonstration event at the 1992 Winter Olympics.

== Military service ==
Curry was commissioned into the Royal Artillery from cadet on 19 October 1941 and served in Burma and India during the Second World War in the 17th Indian Division. He fought at the Battle of Kohima (1944) and left India as a Second Lieutenant, returning to serve in the War Office.

== Athletics ==
Curry was a good sportsman awarded Blues in squash, athletics, and cross-country. He won the 1947 Varsity Race and represented Great Britain in the 1947 World Student Games in Paris, where he finished fourth in the three-mile-race. He became the British 2 miles steeplechase champion at the 1948 AAA Championships and was selected for that event at the 1948 Olympics in London, but did not make the final. He considered his best distance to be the mile and beat Roger Bannister twice over that distance, first in the 1946 Oxford University Freshmen Sports and subsequently when Bannister was running for Oxford University at a race in St Leonards-on-Sea, West Sussex. However, Curry did not run or train with Bannister during the build-up to the four-minute mile (which happened in 1954).

== Legal career ==
Curry was called by Middle Temple in 1953 and took silk for the first time in 1966. A year later, he left the bar and joined Freshfields as a solicitor, where he set up the tax department. Returning to the bar in 1970, he took silk for a second time in 1974. In 1979 he became head of chambers at 4 Stone Buildings, a position in which he remained until his retirement in 1996.

Curry appeared in many reported cases. He acted for John Lennon, George Harrison, and Ringo Starr in their dispute with Paul McCartney, the shareholders in Banco Ambrosiano, following the bank's collapse in the 1980s, and for Thomas Ward, the former director involved in the Guinness share-trading scandal.
