= British Ski Academy =

Ski school for British skiers based in the Alps

The British Ski Academy is a ski-academy affiliated to Snowsport England with a training facility in Ponte Suaz, in the Aosta Valley of the Italian Alps. It previously ran a facility in Les Houches in the Chamonix valley in France, before coaching regulations forced a move. It has training scholarships, and organises competitions.

Olympians who have trained at the facility include Laurie Taylor Charlie Guest, Jasmin Taylor, Alex Tilley, and Florence Bell. Before her move to the music industry, Mollie King was also a scholar there.
