= Charlie Guest =

Scottish alpine ski racer (born 1993)

Personal information
- Born: 30 December 1993 (age 32) Edinburgh, Scotland
- Height: 177 cm (5 ft 10 in)

Skiing career
- Sport: Alpine skiing ♀
- Club: Scottish Ski Club
- Disciplines: slalom, giant slalom
- World Cup debut: January 2013

Olympics
- Teams: 2 – (2018, 2022)

World Championships
- Teams: 4 – (2015, 2019, 2021, 2023)
Medal record
Women's Alpine skiing
Representing Great Britain
FIS European Cup
Gold medal – first place	2019 Folgaria, ITA	Slalom
Gold medal – first place	2020 Hasliberg, SUI	Slalom
Gold medal – first place	2021 Reiteralm, AUT	Slalom
Silver medal – second place	2019 Jasna, SVK	Slalom
Silver medal – second place	2019 Funasdalen, SWE	Slalom
Bronze medal – third place	2019 Funasdalen, SWE	Slalom
Australia New Zealand Cup
Gold medal – first place	2013 Overall Winner	Giant Slalom
Gold medal – first place	2013 Cardrona, NZL	Giant Slalom
Gold medal – first place	2018 Coronet Peak, NZL	Slalom
Silver medal – second place	2013 Mt.Hutt, NZL	Slalom
Bronze medal – third place	2016 Coronet Peak, NZL	Slalom
Senior British National Alpine Ski Championship Titles
Gold medal – first place	2014, 2016, 2017, 2018, 2022	Slalom
Gold medal – first place	2014	Giant Slalom
Gold medal – first place	2013	Alpine Combined
Junior British National Alpine Ski Championship Titles
Gold medal – first place	2014	Slalom
Gold medal – first place	2014	Giant Slalom

Charlotte "Charlie" Guest (born 30 December 1993) is a retired Scottish World Cup alpine ski racer who specialised in slalom and competed occasionally in giant slalom. She was the first British woman ever to win an Alpine European Cup race.

She is the granddaughter of The Honorable Dame Mary Drummond Corsar (8 July 1927 – 12 August 2020)

== Career ==
=== Early career ===
Born in Edinburgh, Scotland, Guest started skiing at the age of 3 on the slopes of Cairngorm in the Scottish Highlands near her grandmother's home in Nethy Bridge. Guest trained there with the Scottish Ski Club until she joined the British Ski Academy in France at 11. At age 14, she became the first British girl to win an international children's race, before moving into FIS racing as part of the Scottish Alpine Ski Team.

=== Adult career ===
Guest made her slalom World Cup debut in 2013 at Flachau, Austria.

At the end of 2014, she broke her spine in a skiing accident in Sweden, but by February 2016 had re-entered the top 100 rankings.

In the FIS Alpine World Ski Championships 2015, Guest finished 32 in the slalom and 43 in the giant slalom just 11 weeks after breaking four vertebrae.

In January 2018, Guest was selected to participate in the 2018 Winter Olympics. She placed 33 in the slalom and reached the quarterfinals of the inaugural mixed team event.

She was again selected to compete in the FIS Alpine World Ski Championships 2019 after missing the 2017 Championships with a broken hand, where she achieved Britain's best female performance with a 24th in the Slalom.

Guest broke records as a British skier in 2019, becoming the first British woman ever to win an Alpine European Cup race. She went on again to win in Hasliberg, Switzerland, in January 2020.

In 2019, Guest began studying for a BSc in psychology at The University of Aberdeen graduating with First Class Honours in 2025.

December 2019 saw Guest secure her first FIS Alpine World Cup points in St. Moritz, Switzerland, after qualifying in joint 12th place in the Parallel Slalom event but going out in the first knockout round to finish 29th.

In January 2022 Guest scored her best ever World Cup result, placing 13th in a slalom in Schladming, Austria, following which she represented Team GB at the 2022 Winter Olympics in Beijing, where she finished 21st in the slalom.

Following her retirement from competition, Guest serves on the British Olympic Association's Athletes Commission, and has provided co-commentary for Eurosport's alpine skiing coverage.

== World Cup results ==
=== Season standings ===
Season	Age	Overall	Slalom	Giant slalom	Super-G	Downhill	Combined
2020	26	124	—	—	—	—	—
2021	27	82	33	—	—	—	—
2022	28	70	25	—	—	—	—

Standings through 30 January 2022

== Olympic Results ==
Year	Age	Slalom	Giant slalom	Super-G	Downhill	Combined
2018	24	33	—	—	—	—
2022	28	21	—	—	—	—
