= Grass skiing =

Sport discipline

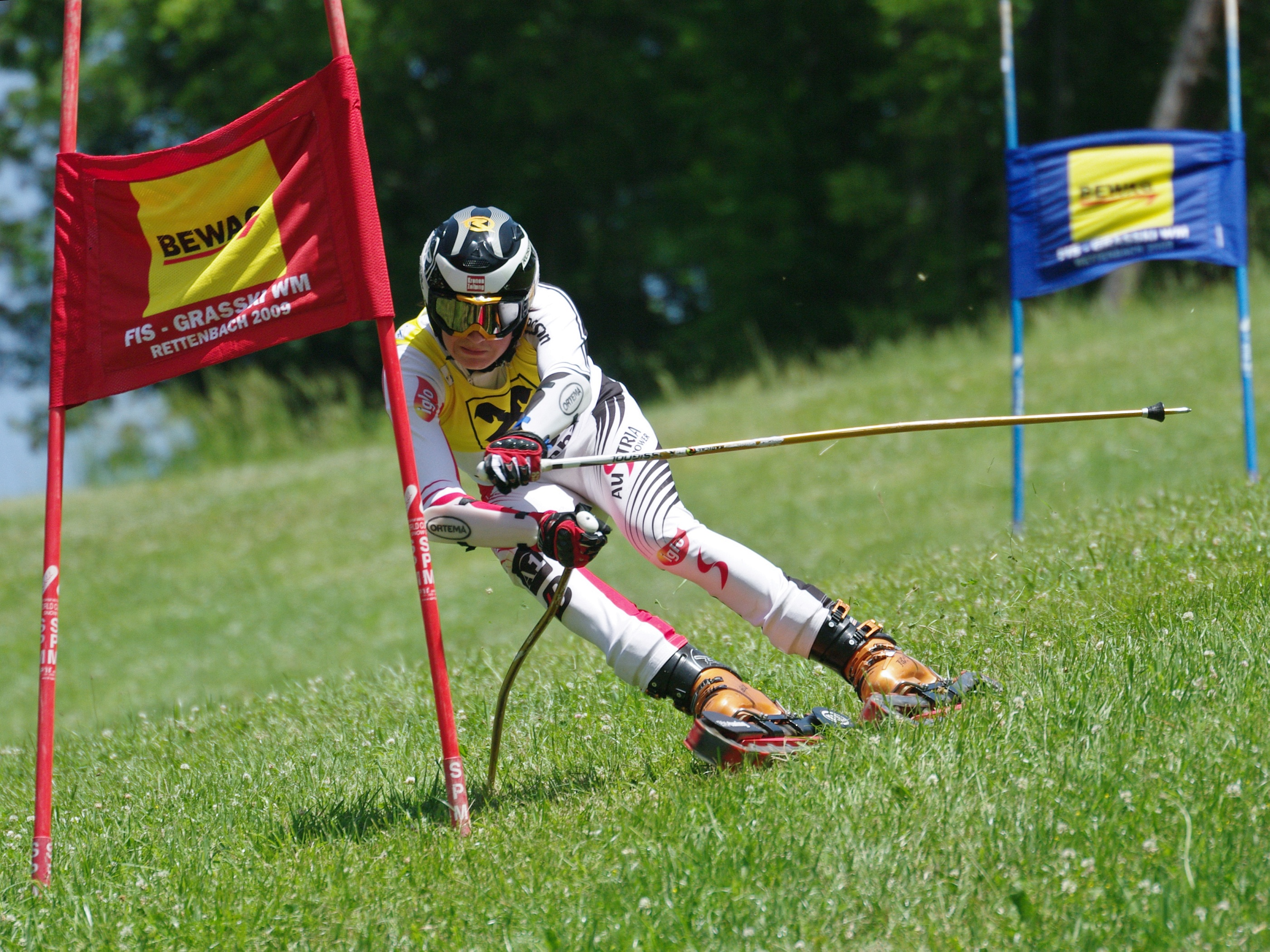
Austrian grass skier Hannes Angerer at the 2010 Austrian Grasski Championships in Rettenbach.

Grass skiing, skiing on grass, is a training method for alpine skiing and an established sport of its own. The skis used for grass skiing are short with rolling treads or wheels. These skis are attached to the skiers' boots. Depending on the skill of the grass skier, high speeds and jumps can be navigated.

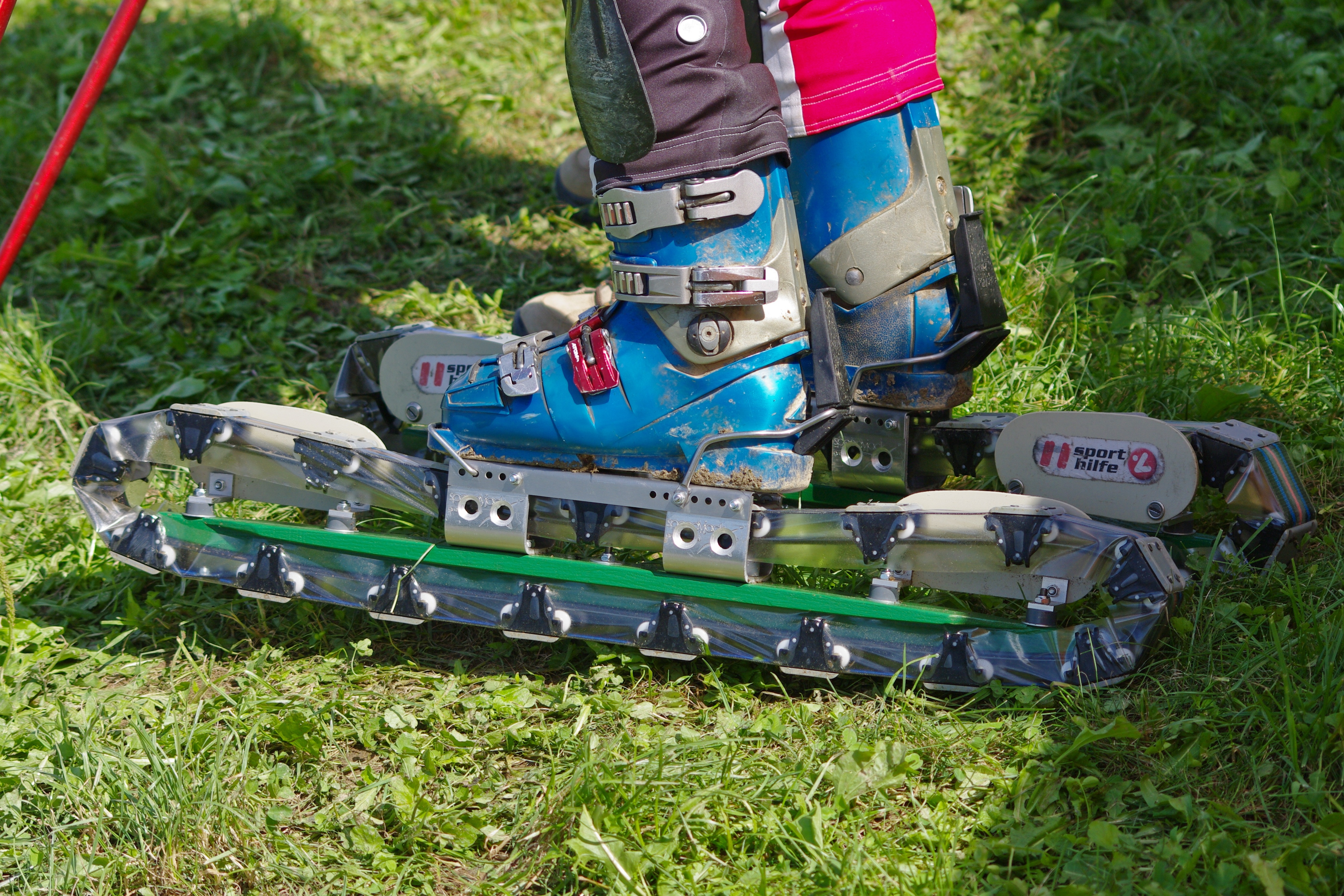
Tracked grass skis

Grass skiing was invented by Josef Kaiser in Germany in 1963. It was created initially as a training method for skiers before the winter season.

Originally, skis used in grass skiing were like rolling treads attached to the ski boots. Currently there are two types of skis used in grass skiing. These are the wheeled models and the tracked ones. The wheeled model can be used in various terrains and for freestyle skiing and off-piste skiing. The tracked model on the other hand is specifically designed to be used on grass slopes.

== See also ==
- Mountain boarding, skateboards made for off-road downhill skating, similar to snowboarding.
- Mountain Blading, in-line skates with inflatable wheels that are made for off-road downhill skating.
