= British Medal Winners at FIS World Cup and World Championships in Ski and Snowboard =

== World Cup ==
Athlete	Medals	Winner	Second	Third	Years of World Cup competition	Disciplines of podium performances
Jasmin Taylor	73	21	22	30	2011-active	Telemark
Jilly Curry	29	3	15	11	1984–1994	Freestyle Skiing (Aerials, Combined)
Mike Nemesvary	16	3	6	7	1980–1985	Freestyle Skiing (Aerials, Combined)
Katie Ormerod	11	1	6	4	2013-active	Snowboard (Slopestyle, Big Air)
Julia Snell	8	1	4	3	1984–1993	Freestyle Skiing (Ski Ballet/Acro)
James Woods	7	4	2	1	2008-active	Freestyle Skiing (Slopestyle)
Charlotte Bankes^	7	4	1	2	2018-active^	Snowboard Cross
Zoe Gillings-Brier	7	1	2	4	2001-active	Snowboard Cross
Lesley McKenna	6	2	3	1	1996-2010	Snowboard (Halfpipe)
Izzy Atkin	5	1	2	2	2013-active	Freestyle Skiing (Slopestyle)
David Ryding	3	1	2		2009-active	Alpine Skiing (Slalom, Parallel Slalom)
Jamie Nicholls	3	1	1	1	2008-active	Snowboard (Slopestyle)
Katie Summerhayes	3		3		2012-active	Freestyle Skiing (Slopestyle)
Billy Morgan	3			3	2012-active	Snowboard (Slopestyle, Big Air)
Marc Poncin	2		1	1	2002-2015	Speed Skiing
Andrew Musgrave	2			2	2008-active	Cross Country
Divina Galica	2			2	1968-1971	Alpine Skiing (Downhill)
Andrew Young	2			2	2008-active	Cross Country
Rowan Cheshire	1	1			2012-2018	Freestyle Skiing (Halfpipe)
Nigel Brockton	1	1			2003-2013	Speed Skiing
Zoe Atkin	1	1			2019-active	Freestyle Skiing (Halfpipe)
Gus Kenworthy^^	1	1			2020-active	Freestyle Skiing (Big Air, Halfpipe, Slopestyle)
Gina Hathorn	1		1		1967-1972	Alpine Skiing (Slalom)
Konrad Bartelski	1		1		1981-1982	Alpine Skiing (Downhill)
Richard Cobbing	1		1		1991-1995	Freestyle Skiing (Aerial)
Jenny Jones	1		1		2001-2013	Snowboard (Slopestyle)
Thomas Gerken Schofield	1		1		2017-active	Freestyle Skiing (Moguls)
Jan Farrell	1			1	2011-active	Speed Skiing
Ben Kilner	1			1	2005-2016	Snowboard (Halfpipe)
Total	160	31	62	67		

== World Championships ==
Athlete	Medals	Winner	Second	Third	Years of World Championships entered	Disciplines of podium performances
Evie Pinching	3	2	1		1935-1936	Alpine Skiing (Downhill, Slalom, Combined)
James Woods	3	1	1	1	2011-active	Freestyle Skiing (Slopestyle)
Esme Mackinnon	2	2			1931	Alpine Skiing (Downhill, Slalom)
Isabel Atkin	2			2	2017-active	Freestyle Skiing (Slopestyle, Big Air)
Jeanette Kessler	2			2	1931-1934	Alpine Skiing (Slalom, Combined)
Jasmin Taylor	2			2	2013-active	Telemark (Sprint, Classic)
Mia Brooks	1	1			2023-active	Snowboard Slopestyle
Charlotte Bankes^	1		1		2019-active^	Snowboard Cross
Helen Boughton-Leigh	1		1		1933	Alpine Skiing (Slalom)
Nell Carroll	1		1		1931	Alpine Skiing (Downhill)
Richard Cobbing	1		1		1993-1995	Freestyle Skiing (Aerials)
Audrey Sale-Barker	1		1		1931-1934	Alpine Skiing (Slalom)
Katie Summerhayes	1		1		2011-active	Freestyle Skiing (Slopestyle)
Doreen Elliot	1			1	1932	Alpine Skiing (Slalom)
Marc Poncin	1			1	2003-2015	Speed Skiing

^ Charlotte Bankes started representing France in season 2010/11. She began competing in World Cups for France from 2013/14 and also competed at the 2015 and 2017 World Championships. Records here are achievements since transferring to a British licence in November 2018. Her first season racing for Great Britain in World Cups and other competitions was 2018/19 and her first World Championships for Great Britain were in 2019.

^^ Gus Kenworthy competed for USA until 2019/20 when he switched to Great Britain. While competing for USA, Gus earned seven World Cup podiums (including two victories), one Olympic silver medal and one World Championships silver medal.
