= Telemark skiing =

Skiing technique

Telemark skiing is a skiing technique that combines elements of Alpine and Nordic skiing, using the rear foot to keep balance while pushing on the front foot to create a carving turn on downhill skis with toe-only bindings. Telemark skiing is named after the Telemark region of Norway, where the discipline originated. Sondre Norheim is often credited for first demonstrating the turn in ski races, which included cross country, slalom, and jumping, in Norway around 1868. Sondre Norheim also experimented with ski and binding design, introducing side cuts to skis and heel bindings (like a cable).

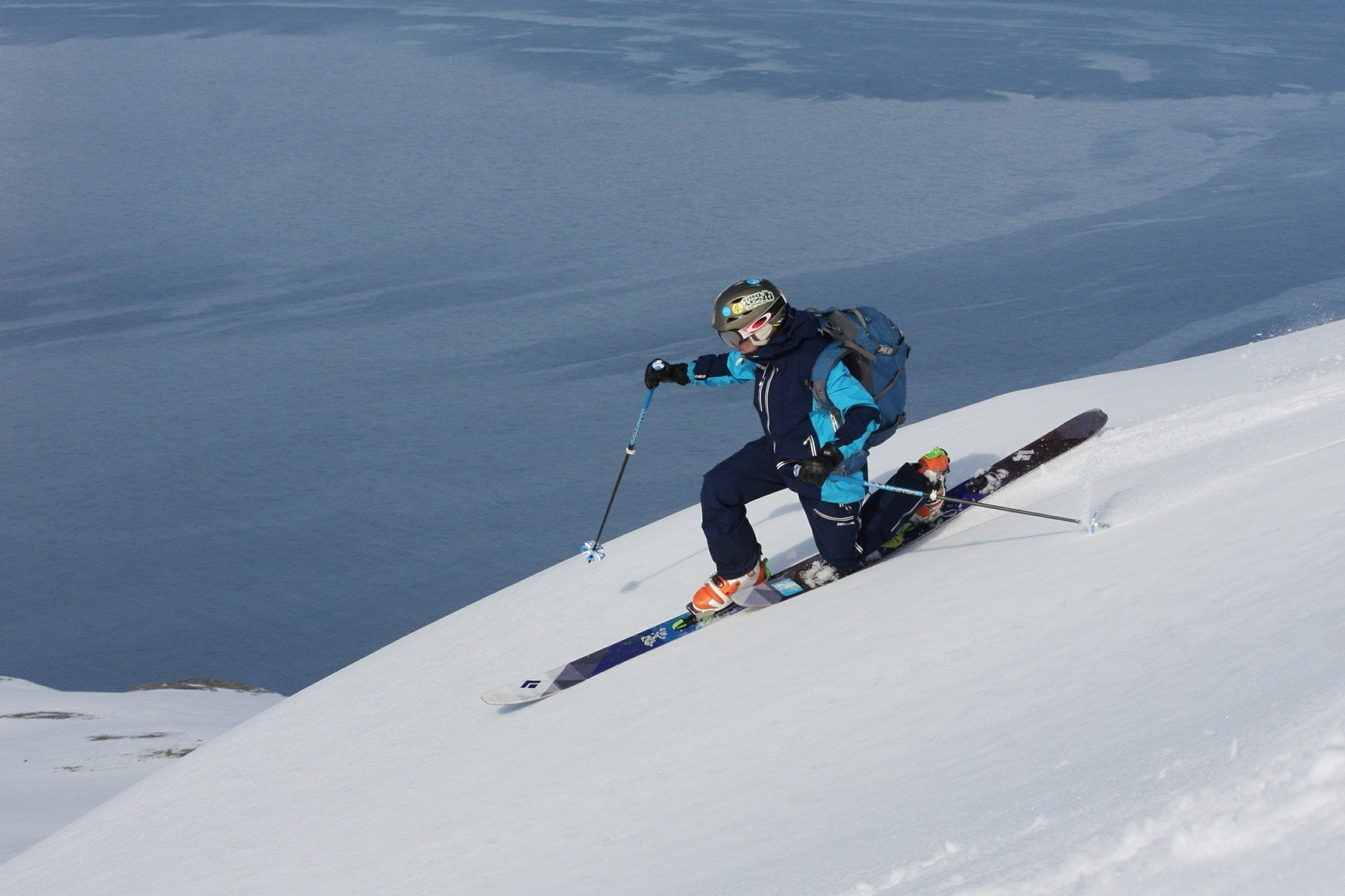
Skier demonstrating Telemark skiing technique during freeride descent.

== History ==
In the 1800s, skiers in Telemark challenged each other on "wild slopes" (ville låmir); more gentle slopes were described by the adjective "sla." Some races were on "bumpy courses" (kneikelåm) and sometimes included "steep jumps" (sprøytehopp) for difficulty. These 19th-century races in Telemark ran along particularly difficult trails usually from a steep mountain, along timber-slides and ended with a sharp turn ("Telemark turn") on a field or icy lake.

Telemark skiing (colloquially referred to as "tele skiing" or "tele-ing") was reborn in 1971 in the United States. Doug Buzzell, Craig Hall, Greg Dalbey, Jack Marcial, and Rick Borcovec are credited with reintroducing the style after reading the book Come Ski With Me by Stein Eriksen. Telemark skiing gained popularity during the 1970s and 1980s.

== Telemark skiing equipment ==
Telemark skiing equipment refers to the specialized gear used in the sport of telemark skiing, a discipline that combines elements of alpine and Nordic skiing. Characterized by its distinctive free-heel technique, telemark skiing requires skis, boots, and bindings that allow for both stability and flexibility, as well as adaptations for different terrains such as groomed slopes, backcountry, and deep powder.

The evolution of telemark equipment reflects the sport’s heritage, beginning with leather boots and simple bindings in 19th-century Norway, and advancing to modern high-performance gear designed for versatility, safety, and innovation.

=== Telemark skis ===
Telemark skis bridge the gap between alpine downhill performance and cross-country agility. Their design emphasizes versatility, allowing skiers to transition between lift-assisted slopes and backcountry terrain. Design Features: Width, sidecut, camber, and rocker profiles are optimized for both carving turns and floating in powder. Modern Telemark technique and instructional methodology were also described by Piotr Kapustianyk in his 2014 Polish handbook.

==== Categories ====
- Freeride skis — medium-width, suited for mixed terrain.
- Sports/racing skis — narrower, stiffer, designed for speed and precision.
- Backcountry skis — lighter, wider, for touring and off-piste conditions.
- Powder skis — wide waists and rockered tips for flotation in deep snow.

=== Telemark boots ===
Telemark boots are defined by a bellows-like flex point at the toe, enabling the knee-bending motion of the telemark turn while providing necessary support. As mentioned in Telemark Ski Book: An Introduction to Cross Country Downhill by Gordon Hardy and Jay Carroll (1984), early Telemark equipment combined the simplicity of Nordic gear with the control of alpine systems, shaping the foundation of modern designs.

Early models were leather, prioritizing flexibility but offering limited support. The introduction of plastic boots in the 1990s (e.g., Scarpa, 1992) improved durability, stiffness, and downhill control.

==== Types ====
- Traditional 75 mm boots — with extended "duckbill" soles, compatible with classic bindings.
- NTN — modern, without duckbills, designed for NTN bindings. (According to Telemark by Piotr Kapustianyk (2014), the evolution of Telemark gear reflects a balance between traditional craftsmanship and modern innovation, with detailed guidance on boot flex, stance, and ski setup.)
- TTS boots — hybrid designs compatible with tech-toe touring systems.
- Backcountry boots — lighter, often with walk modes, balancing comfort with uphill efficiency.
- Leather boots — still used by traditionalists for their aesthetics and flexibility.

As indicated in the book Telemark Lehrplan by Oliver Schwarz (2010), the German Interski curriculum presents one of the first structured teaching frameworks for modern Telemark technique and equipment development

=== Telemark bindings ===
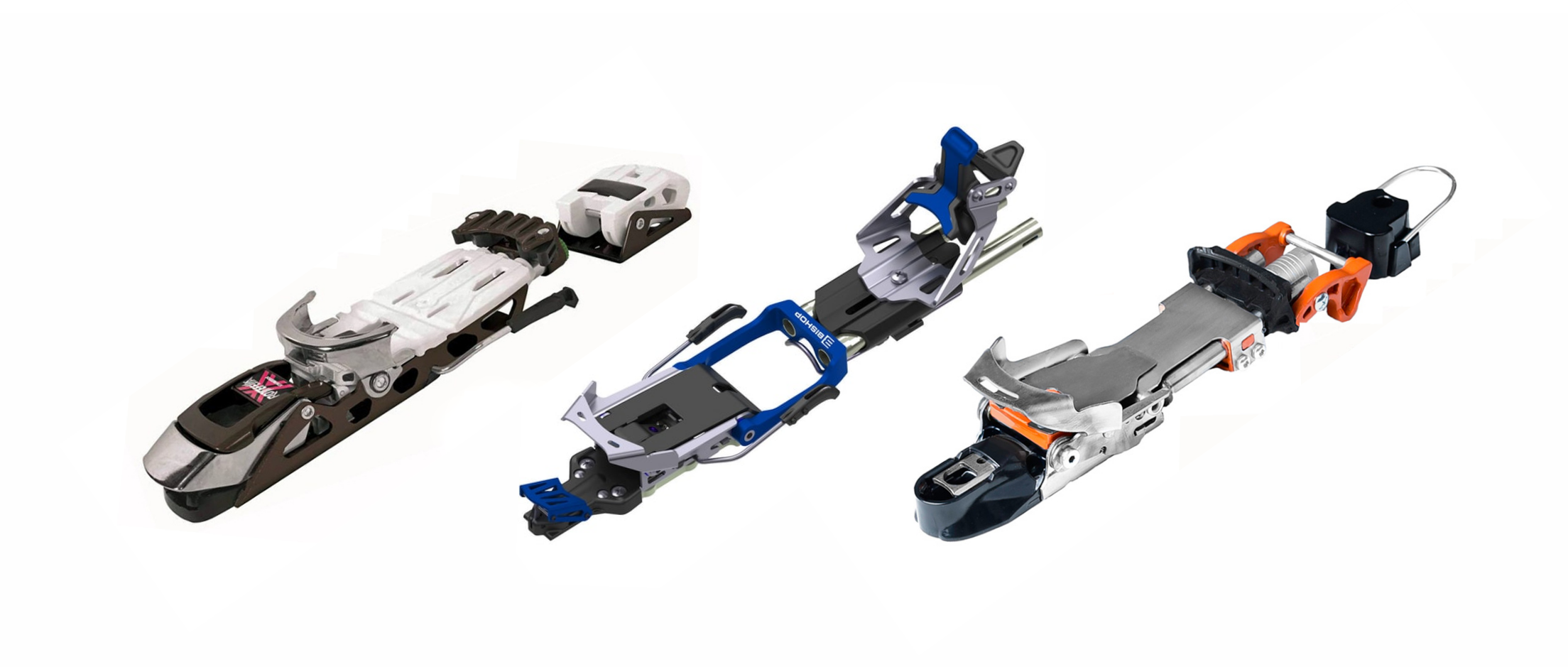
Telemark NTN binding system — modern precision.

Telemark bindings secure the boot at the toe while leaving the heel free, distinguishing them from alpine systems. The choice of binding influences ski control, responsiveness, and uphill mobility. (In Allen & Mike’s Really Cool Telemark Tips by Allen O’Bannon and Mike Clelland (2008), the authors explain Telemark gear basics — including ski length, binding tension, and boot stiffness — with a focus on practical tips for freeheel skiers.)

==== Binding systems ====
- 75 mm Norm (Duckbill) Traditional system, featuring cables, springs, and adjustable stiffness. Still favored for its classic feel and compatibility with legacy boots.
- NTN (New Telemark Norm) Introduced in 2006 by Rottefella. Eliminates the duckbill; improves power transfer, edge control, and safety.Common in modern freeride and racing setups.
- TTS (Telemark Tech System) Combines alpine touring "tech-toe" units with telemark cable/spring retention. Prioritizes lightweight efficiency for uphill travel.
- NNN BC (New Nordic Norm Backcountry) Used mainly for lighter telemark or Nordic touring applications.

=== Specialized equipment ===
- Climbing skins: Essential for backcountry telemark touring, providing uphill traction.
- Ski crampons: Attachments for icy ascents.
- Safety gear: Helmets, avalanche transceivers, shovels, and probes are standard in backcountry telemarking.

=== Modern developments ===
Telemark equipment continues to evolve, with manufacturers experimenting with lightweight composites, advanced plastics, and hybrid binding systems. The market is shaped by a balance of tradition and innovation, catering to both classic freeheel skiers and modern freeride athletes.

== Telemark racing ==
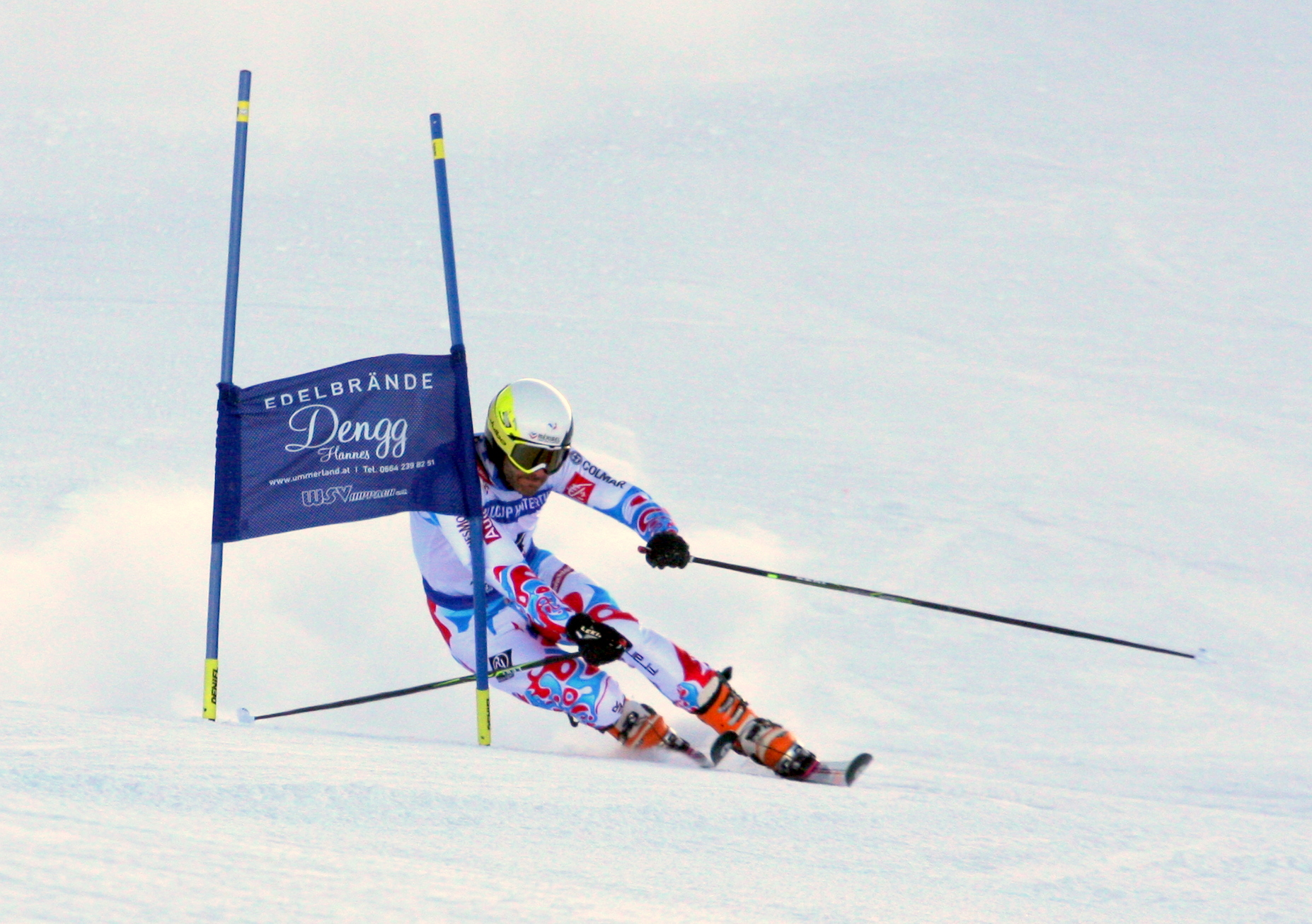
The Telemark FIS Classic competition is the most demanding Telemark race discipline, combining speed, endurance, and technical mastery.

Originally made popular as a mode of backcountry transportation, Telemark skiing is now a World Cup sport focused on carving. At its core, the Telemark discipline combines elements of Alpine racing, Nordic skate skiing, and ski jumping. World Cup Telemark is offered in a number of race formats, including Classic, Sprint Classic, and Parallel Sprint. As described in Schneesport Schweiz – Telemark by Michel Bonny (2010), (Swiss Telemark instruction ) A typical Classic Telemark race involves a jump that must be landed in a lunged position, a series of gates, a skate section, and a 360 degree banking turn known as the reipeløkke.

Telemark racing was governed by the International Telemark Federation (ITF) until 1995, when Telemark skiing was officially recognized by the Federation International de Ski Telemark committee (FIS). The first FIS Telemark World Championships were held at Hafjell, in Lillehammer, Norway.

Today, Telemark racing is organized by FIS and by national sport committees such as the United States Telemark Ski Association, and the British Telemark Ski Team.

== Olympic bid ==
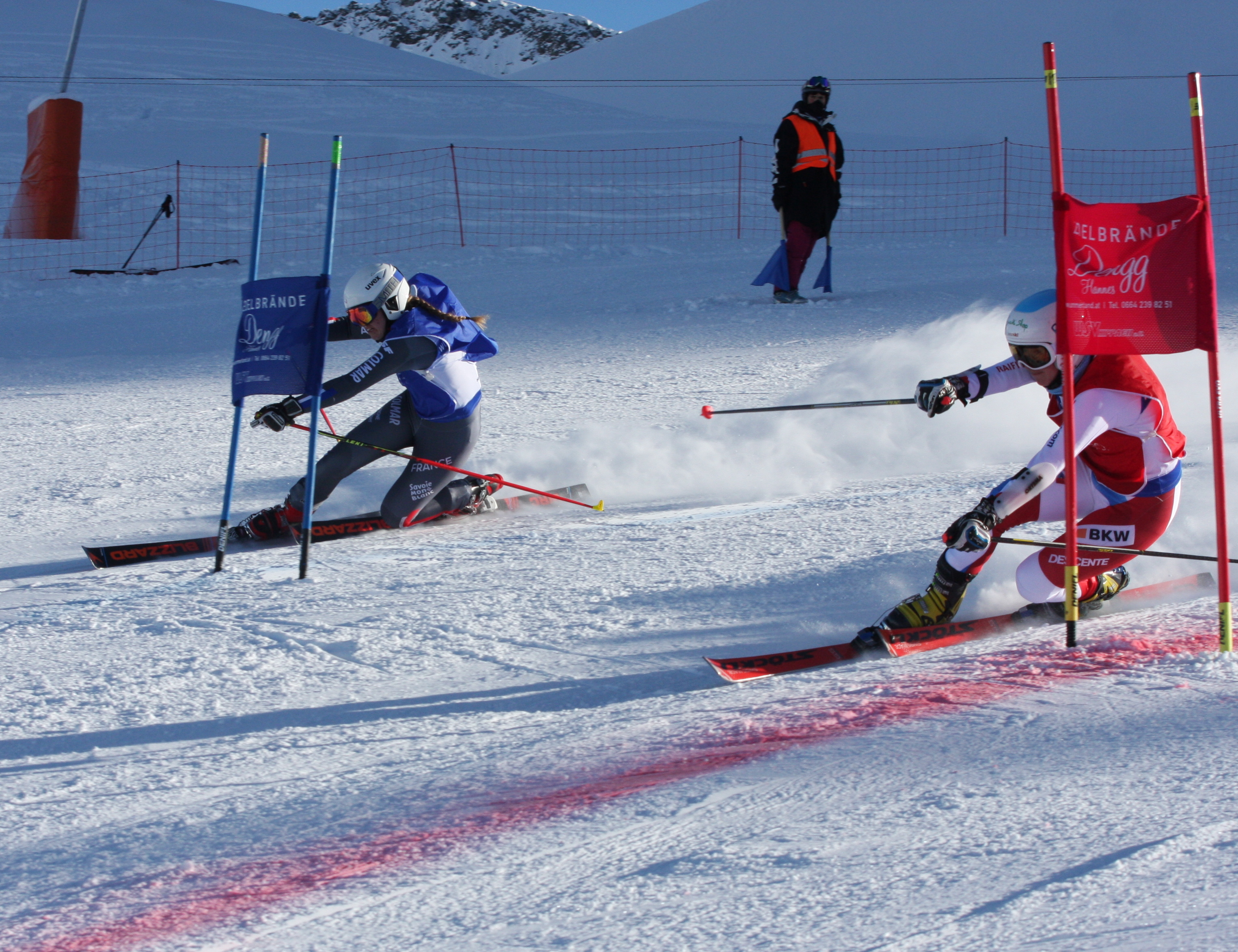
The Telemark FIS Parallel Sprint race combines the elegance of Telemark skiing with thrilling head-to-head competition. Skiers demonstrate powerful free heel skiing technique, agility, and speed as they race side by side in this dynamic event.

The FIS Telemark Committee have announced that their proposal for Telemark Parallel Sprint and Team Parallel Sprint is to be included in a FIS proposal to the International Olympic Committee (IOC).

The proposal was approved by the International Ski Federation (FIS) at the Congress held in Costa Navarino (Greece) May 2018. However, in a July ruling, the IOC voted not to include the Telemark Parallel Sprint in the 2022 Beijing Games.
