= Hanaho Yamamoto =

Japanese traceur

Personal information
- Nationality: Japanese
- Born: February 11, 1990 (age 36) Nagoya, Aichi, Japan

Sport
- Sport: Parkour
Medal record
Women's parkour
Representing Japan
Parkour World Championships
Silver medal – second place	2022 Tokyo	Freestyle

Hanaho Yamamoto (山本華歩, Yamamoto Hanaho; born February 11, 1990) is a Japanese traceur.

== Career ==
Yamamoto began practicing parkour in October 2008.

In October 2022, at the Parkour World Championships in Tokyo, Yamamoto won the silver medal in freestyle in the first edition of the championship. She scored 25 points and was beaten only by Ella Bucio of Mexico.
