= Gymnastics at the 2027 European Games – Qualification =

Qualification for gymnastics at the 2027 European Games

Gymnastics – Qualification at the 2027 European Games
- Venue: Sinan Erdem Dome
- Location: Istanbul, Turkey
- Dates: 8 April 2026 – 16 May 2027
- Competitors: 496 from 24 (as of November 2026) nations

A total of 496 athletes will qualify for the gymnastics and parkour competitions at the 2027 European Games across six disciplines: artistic (192), rhythmic (96), trampoline (80 across trampoline, tumbling, and double mini-trampoline), aerobic (56), acrobatic (40), and parkour (32).

Most quota places are non-nominative and allocated to National Olympic Committees (NOCs), with the exception of individual medalist spots in artistic gymnastics, which are nominative to the specific athlete.

As the host nation, Turkey is guaranteed reserved quota places across disciplines if not qualified through standard pathways, though Turkey declined its host places in tumbling and double mini-trampoline.

== Qualification timeline ==
Discipline	Qualifying event	Date	Venue
Trampoline	2026 European Trampoline Championships	8–12 April 2026	(Portugal) Portimão
Aerobic	2026 Aerobic Gymnastics World Championships	11–13 September 2026	(Spain) Pamplona
Tumbling & Double mini-trampoline	2026 Trampoline Gymnastics World Championships	4–8 November 2026	(China) Nanjing
Acrobatic	2027 European Acrobatic Gymnastics Championships	24–28 March 2027	(Italy) Pesaro
Artistic	2027 European Artistic Gymnastics Championships	27 April – 2 May 2027	(Armenia) Yerevan
Parkour	2027 FIG Parkour World Cup	6–9 May 2027	(France) Montpellier
Rhythmic	2027 Rhythmic Gymnastics European Championships	12–16 May 2027	(Spain) Pamplona

== Qualification summary ==
The following table details the National Olympic Committees that have secured quota places as of 11 November 2026 (covering trampoline, (including tumbling, double mini-trampoline) and aerobic gymnastics).

Nation	Artistic		Rhythmic		Trampoline		Acrobatic		Aerobic		Parkour		Total
Nation	Men	Women	Ind.	Group	Men	Women	Group	Pairs	Groups	Pairs	Men	Women	Total
Austria					1	0			0	0			1
Azerbaijan					3	1			0	2			6
Belarus (Note: Athletes from Belarus and Russia competed as Authorised Neutral Athletes (AIN) at qualifying events.)					2	2			0	0			4
Belgium					2	2			0	0			4
Bulgaria					0	1			5	0			6
Czech Republic					1	1			0	0			2
Denmark					2	2			0	0			4
Finland					0	0			5	0			5
France					2	3			0	0			5
Georgia					0	2			0	0			2
Germany					3	3			0	0			6
Great Britain					2	2			0	0			4
Greece					1	1			0	2			4
Hungary					0	0			5	0			5
Italy					1	1			5	2			9
Netherlands					2	3			0	0			5
Poland					2	0			0	0			2
Portugal					4	4			0	0			8
Romania					0	0			5	2			7
Russia					4	5			5	2			16
Spain					4	4			5	2			15
Sweden					0	1			0	0			1
Turkey					2	2			5	2			11
Ukraine					1	1			0	2			4
Total: 24 NOCs	0/96	0/96	0/16	0/80	40/40	40/40	0/24	0/16	40/40	16/16	0/16	0/16	136/496

== Artistic gymnastics ==
Artistic gymnastics features a total quota of 192 athletes, evenly split between 96 men and 96 women, with each NOC permitted to enter a maximum of five men and five women. As there is no team all-around event

=== Men's events ===
Event	Criterion	Quota places	Qualified NOC / Gymnast
2027 European Championships	Teams ranked 1–13	26	tbd
2027 European Championships	Teams ranked 14–20	21	tbd
2027 European Championships	Top AA individuals (max. 2 per NOC)	14	tbd
2027 European Championships	Unrepresented NOCs (max. 1 per NOC)	12	tbd
2027 European Championships	All-around medalists	3	tbd
2027 European Championships	Apparatus medalists	18	tbd
Host nation quota		1	Turkey
EG injury wildcard		1	tbd
Total	96		

=== Women's events ===
Event	Criterion	Quota places	Qualified NOC / Gymnast
2027 European Championships	Teams ranked 1–13	26	
2027 European Championships	Teams ranked 14–22	27	
2027 European Championships	Top AA individuals (max. 2 per NOC)	16	
2027 European Championships	Unrepresented NOCs (max. 1 per NOC)	11	
2027 European Championships	All-around medalists (nominative)	3	
2027 European Championships	Apparatus medalists (nominative, apparatus-only)	12	
European Gymnastics injury wildcard		1	
Total	96		

== Rhythmic gymnastics ==
Rhythmic gymnastics allocates 96 quota places consisting of 16 individual gymnasts and 16 groups of five athletes, with a maximum of one individual and one group per NOC. All places are earned at the 2027 Rhythmic Gymnastics European Championships in Pamplona.

The top 16 athletes in the individual all-around qualification ranking (based on their best three of four routines) secure one non-nominative spot each for their NOC, while the top 16 teams in the group all-around competition secure five non-nominative spots each.

If Turkey fails to qualify through either pathway, it replaces the 16th-ranked NOC in the respective event.

Event	Qualified NOCs	
Event	Teams (5 per NOC)	Individuals (1 per NOC)
2027 European Championships (12–16 May 2027)	Top 16 NOCs	Top 16 NOCs
Total	80	16

== Trampoline gymnastics ==
Trampoline gymnastics comprises 80 quota places divided between trampoline (48), tumbling (16), and double mini-trampoline (16), with a standard maximum of eight athletes per NOC (two men and two women in trampoline, and one per gender in tumbling and double mini-trampoline, extendable to two only if insufficient NOCs qualify).

In trampoline, contested at the 2026 European Trampoline Championships in Portimão, the top eight pairs in both the men's and women's synchronised finals each earn two non-nominative places for their NOCs, and those selected athletes are required to compete in the individual event as well. The remaining eight spots per gender are distributed to the highest-placed athletes from unrepresented NOCs across the individual final, semi-final, and qualification rounds.

=== Trampoline ===
Event	Men		Women	
Event	Synchro (2 per NOC)	Individual	Synchro (2 per NOC)	Individual
2026 European Trampoline Championships	Azerbaijan; Belarus; Germany; Netherlands; Portugal; Russia; Spain; Turkey	Austria; Belgium; Czech Republic; Denmark; France; Greece; Italy; Ukraine	Belarus; France; Georgia; Germany; Netherlands; Portugal; Russia; Spain	Azerbaijan; Bulgaria; Czech Republic; Denmark; Italy; Turkey; Turkey; Ukraine
Total	16	8	16	8

=== Tumbling & Double mini-trampoline ===
Quotas for tumbling and double mini-trampoline (eight men and eight women per apparatus) were awarded to the top eight European athletes per gender in Qualification Round 1 at the 2026 Trampoline Gymnastics World Championships in Nanjing.

Event	Mem		Women	
	Tumbling	Double mini	Tumbling	Double Mini
2026 Trampoline Gymnastics World Championships	Azerbaijan; Denmark; France; Great Britain; Poland; Portugal; Russia; Spain	Belgium; Germany; Great Britain; Poland; Portugal; Russia; Spain; Sweden	Belgium; Denmark; France; Great Britain; Greece; Portugal; Russia; Spain	Belgium; Germany; Great Britain; Netherlands; Portugal; Russia; Russia; Spain
Total	8	8	8	8

== Acrobatic gymnastics ==
Acrobatic gymnastics features 40 athletes across eight women's groups of three and eight mixed pairs of two, with NOCs limited to one unit per category (five athletes total). Quota places are awarded based on the senior all-around final rankings at the 2027 European Acrobatic Gymnastics Championships in Pesaro.

The top eight women's groups and top eight mixed pairs earn non-nominative places for their respective NOCs, with Turkey guaranteed to replace the eighth-ranked nation in its pre-selected event if not otherwise qualified.

Event	Team (3 per NOC)	Mixed pair (2 per NOC)
2027 Acrobatic Gymnastics European Championships		
Total	24	16

== Aerobic gymnastics ==
Aerobic gymnastics allocates 56 quota places across eight groups of five and eight mixed pairs of two, allowing a maximum of seven athletes per NOC. Qualification took place via the senior qualification rankings at the 2026 Aerobic Gymnastics World Championships in Pamplona, where the top eight European groups and top eight European mixed pairs earned non-nominative places for their NOCs.

Turkey pre-selected the group event for its host country guarantee prior to qualifying on merit in both events.

Great Britain originally qualified in the mixed pair event, but opted to forgo its quota places, which were awarded to Romania..

Event	Groups (5 per NOC)	Mixed Pairs (2 per NOC)
2026 Aerobic Gymnastics World Championships; Pamplona, September 2026	Bulgaria; Finland; Hungary; Italy; Romania; Russia; Spain; Turkey	Azerbaijan; Greece; Italy; ~~Great Britain~~; Romania; Russia; Spain; Turkey; Ukraine
Total : 56 quotas (11 NOCs)	40	16

== Parkour ==
Parkour makes its European Games debut with 32 athletes split evenly into eight men and eight women in freestyle and eight men and eight women in speed, with each NOC capped at one athlete per gender and discipline (extendable to two if insufficient nations qualify). Quota places are decided at the 2027 FIG Parkour World Cup in Montpellier, where the top eight European finishers in each category secure one non-nominative place for their NOC.

As host nation, Turkey is guaranteed one place in freestyle and one in speed if not already qualified.

Event	Men		Women	
Event	Freestyle	Speed	Freesyle	Speed
2027 FIG Parkour World Cup				
Total	8	8	8	8
