= Audrey Johnson =

American traceur

Personal information
- Born: Atlanta, Georgia

Sport
- Sport: Parkour
Medal record
Women's parkour
Representing United States
World Championships
Silver medal – second place	2024 Kitakyushu	Speed
Bronze medal – third place	2024 Kitakyushu	Freestyle
World Cup
Gold medal – first place	2024 Coimbra	Freestyle
Silver medal – second place	2023 Montpellier	Speed
Bronze medal – third place	2023 Sofia	Speed
Bronze medal – third place	2024 Coimbra	Speed

Audrey Johnson (born 2001) is an American traceur. She won two medals in 2024 Parkour World Championships and was the first American athlete to medal at that year's events.

== Biography ==
Johnson is a speed climbing competitor who did gymnastics from the ages of six to twelve. She has practiced parkour for three years.

In May 2023, Johnson won the silver medal in speed at the 2023 FIG Parkour World Cup in Montpellier, became the first American ever to win World Cup medals. In September, she won the bronze medal in speed at the 2023 FIG Parkour World Cup in Sofia.

In September 2024, she won the World Cup gold medal in freestyle and a bronze in speed at the 2024 FIG Parkour World Cup in Coimbra. She was the first American to win a gold medal in parkour World Cup. In November, Johnson won a silver in speed and bronze in freestyle at the 2024 Parkour World Championships. Upon earning the silver medal, she became the first American to place at that year's events
