= Kolmakov =

Kolmakov (Russian: Колмаков) is a surname. Notable people with the surname include:

- Aleksandr Kolmakov (born 1966), Kazakh ski jumper
- Bohdan Kolmakov (born 1997), Ukrainian traceur
- Pavel Kolmakov (born 1996), Kazakh freestyle skier
