= Lilou Ruel =

French parkour artist (b. 2003)

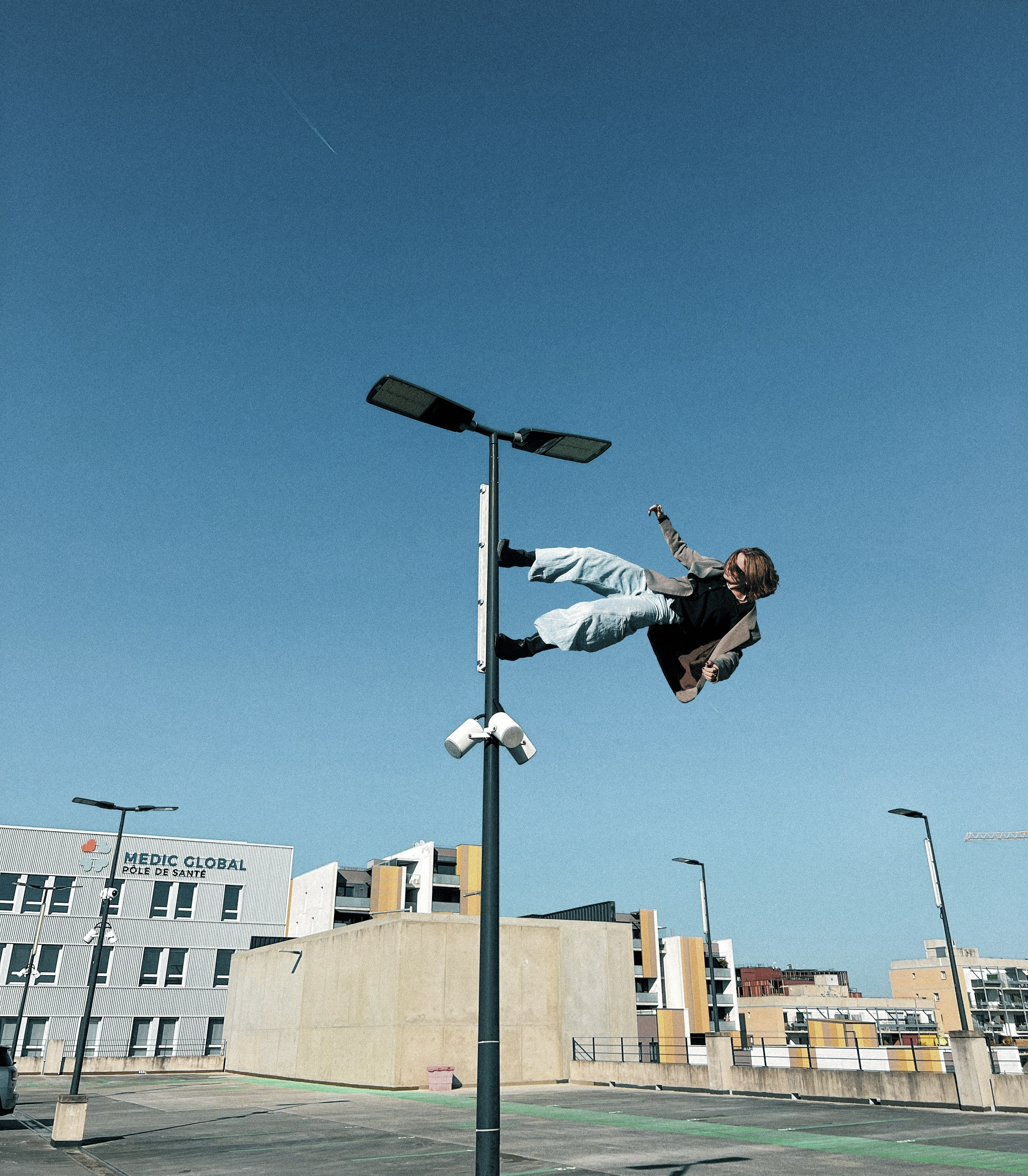

Personal information
- Born: 9 May 2003 (age 23) Mont-Saint-Aignan, Normandy, France

Sport
- Country: France
- Sport: Freerunning; Parkour
Medal record
Representing France
Air Wipp
Bronze medal – third place	2017 Sweden	Women
E-FISE
Silver medal – second place	2020	Parkour freestyle
Freerunning and Parkour World Cup
Gold medal – first place	2021 Sofia	Women's freestyle
Silver medal – second place	2021 Sofia	Women's speed
Bronze medal – third place	2022 Sofia	Women's speed
Bronze medal – third place	2022 Sofia	Women's freestyle
Parkour World Championships
Bronze medal – third place	2022 Tokyo	Women
Red Bull Al-Andalus
Gold medal – first place	2021 Grenada	Women
Red Bull Art of Motion
Silver medal – second place	2021 Pireaus	Best Female
Silver medal – second place	2022 Astypalea	Best Female

Lilou Ruel (born 9 May 2003) is a French freerunner and parkour competitor.

== Early life and education ==
Ruel was born in Mont-Saint-Aignan, Normandy. As a young child, she lived in Turkey for two years. Upon returning to France, the family settled in Plaisance-du-Touch, a suburb of Toulouse.

Ruel's first foray into sports was tennis and speed skating.

Ruel completed her Baccalaureate in Economics and Social studies at Lycée de Tournefeuille in 2021. After taking a gap year, she began studying to become a stuntwoman at Campus Univers Cascade in Northern France.

== Sports career ==
Ruel became interested in parkour at age nine, and began training later that year. At age 11, one of her parkour videos went viral. She began competing at age 14, coming third at the 2017 Air Wipp competition in Sweden. In 2018, she took five months off from the sport following an injury. At age 16, she competed at the 2019 Red Bull Art of Motion.

During the COVID-19 lockdown, Ruel continued to train in her family's garden, and began to consider pursuing free running and parkour as a career. In September 2020, she competed in the virtual E-FISE competition, winning silver in the parkour freestyle event.

At the 2021 Red Bull Al-Andalus, Ruel won the women's event. Later that year, she won gold in the women's freestyle event and silver in women's speed at the 2021 Freerunning and Parkour World Cup in Sofia, Bulgaria.

In May 2022, Ruel became the first woman to try and complete the 4.5m gap/15m tall 'Manpower' jump in Évry, France. That year she also won three medals: bronze in the women's category at the Parkour World Championships, bronze in women's speed and bronze in women's freestyle at the Parkour World Cup.

In July 2024, Ruel performed in the opening ceremony of the Paris Olympics, being one of nine people to portray a masked torchbearer. She reprised the role for the Olympic Champions Parade in September 2024.
