= 2022 FIG Parkour World Championships =

Parkour competition

- Venue: Ariake Urban Sports Park
- Location: Tokyo, Japan
- Start date: October 14, 2022
- End date: October 16, 2022

The 2022 FIG Parkour World Championships were the inaugural Parkour World Championships. Originally scheduled for 2020 and delayed due to the COVID-19 pandemic, they were held from October 14 to 16, 2022, in Tokyo, Japan.

== History ==
The first FIG Parkour World Championships were originally scheduled to take place at Hiroshima on 3–5 April 2020, but postponed as a result of the COVID-19 pandemic.

== Events ==
=== Men ===
Event	Gold	Silver	Bronze
Speed	Bohdan Kolmakov; Ukraine	Andrea Consolini; Italy	Tangui van Schingen; Netherlands
Freestyle	Dimitris Kyrsanidis; Greece	Teng Gaozheng; China	Davide Rizzi; Italy

=== Women ===
Event	Gold	Silver	Bronze
Speed	Miranda Tibbling; Sweden	Stefanny Navarro; Spain	Lilou Ruel; France
Freestyle	Ella Bucio; Mexico	Hanaho Yamamoto; Japan	Adéla Měrková; Czech Republic
