= Ella Bucio =

Mexican traceur (born 1997)

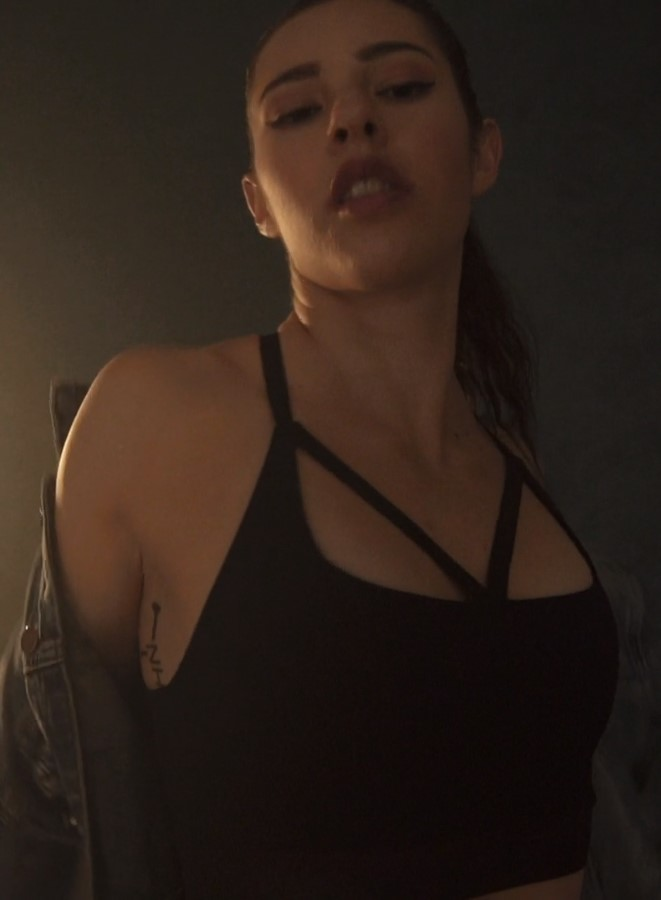

Personal information
- Full name: Ella Bucio Dovali
- Born: 20 August 1997 (age 28) Mexico City, Mexico

Sport
- Sport: Parkour
Medal record
Women's parkour
Representing Mexico
Parkour World Championships
Gold medal – first place	2022 Tokyo	Freestyle
Gold medal – first place	2024 Kitakyushu	Speed
Silver medal – second place	2024 Kitakyushu	Freestyle

Ella Bucio Dovali (born 20 August 1997) is a Mexican traceur.

== Biography ==
In her youth, Bucio trained in artistic gymnastics and she later switched to parkour in 2016. In May 2022, at the World Cup in Montpellier, Bucio won gold in freestyle and bronze in speed. In September 2022 at the World Cup in Sofia, she took her second World Cup victory in freestyle.

In October 2022, at the Parkour World Championships in Tokyo, Bucio took the women's first gold in freestyle category in the first edition of the championship.
