= Bohdan Kolmakov =

Ukrainian traceur (born 1997)

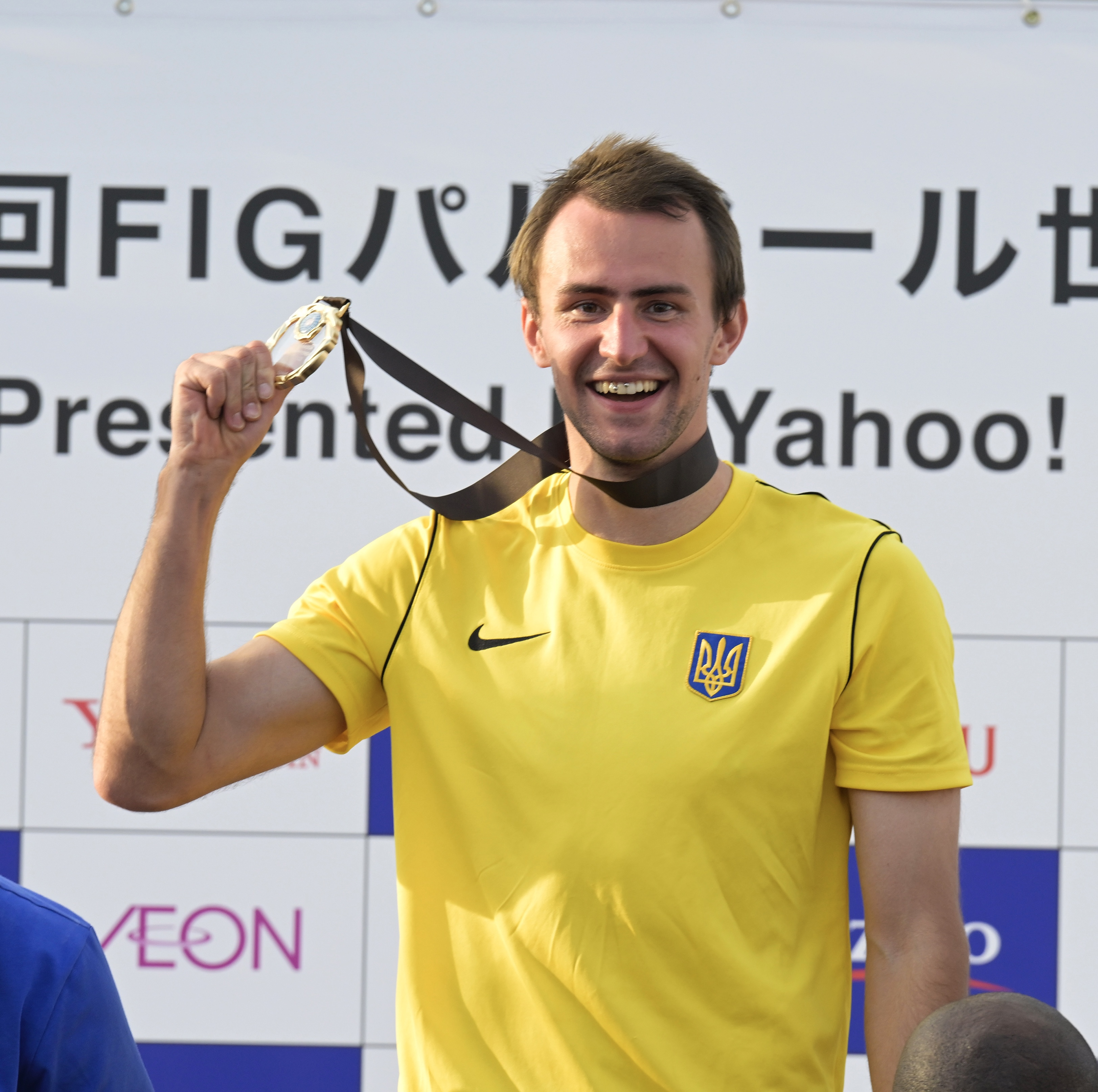
- Kolmakov in 2022

Personal information
- Full name: Bohdan Vitaliyovych Kolmakov
- Nationality: Ukrainian
- Born: 23 November 1997 (age 28) Oleksandriia, Ukraine
- Website: https://www.instagram.com/bohdan.kolmakov/

Sport
- Sport: Parkour
Medal record
Men's parkour
Representing Ukraine
World Games
Gold medal – first place	2022 Birmingham	Speed
Parkour World Championships
Gold medal – first place	2022 Tokyo	Speed
Parkour World Cup
Gold medal – first place	2021 Sofia	Speed
Gold medal – first place	2022 Sofia	Speed
Silver medal – second place	2023 Montpellier	Speed
Silver medal – second place	2023 Sofia	Speed
Silver medal – second place	2025 Amsterdam	Speed
Bronze medal – third place	2025 Montpellier	Speed
Silver medal – second place	2026 Montpellier	Speed

Bohdan Vitaliyovych Kolmakov (Ukrainian: Богдан Віталійович Колмаков; born 23 November 1997) is a Ukrainian traceur. He is a gold medalist in the World Games and Parkour World Championships, which he both won in 2022.

== Biography ==
Kolmakov began practicing parkour at the age of ten. In September 2021, he won gold in speed at the World Cup in Sofia.

In July 2022, at the 2022 World Games in Birmingham, Alabama, Kolmakov won the gold medal in speed. In September 2022, he also won gold in speed at the World Cup in Sofia. The following month, at the Parkour World Championships in Tokyo, Kolmakov won the gold medal in speed in the first edition of the championship. He won in a time of 25.25 seconds, 0.59 seconds ahead of runner-up Andrea Consolini of Italy.

In May 2023, at the World Cup in Montpellier, Bohdan won the silver medal in speed. In September 2023, at the World Cup in Sofia, he took his second World Cup silver medal in speed.
