= Red Bull Art of Motion =

Parkour and freerunning competition

Red Bull Art of Motion is a parkour and freerunning competition, established in 2007 and created by Red Bull. It is an international competition with qualifiers being held in various regional competitions around the world throughout the year. Winners from the regional competitions each year earn their ticket to get to the finals, held towards the end of the year.

The inaugural competition was held in Vienna, Austria, and has since been held in various other countries, including England, Kuwait, United States, Sweden, Greece (Santorini), and most recently in Matera, Italy. Judging of the event is based on several criteria including creativity, flow, execution, and difficulty.

The Red Bull athletes
(Australia) Dominic Di Tommaso
(Germany) Jason Paul
(Latvia) Pavel Petkuns
(Turkey) Hazal Nehir
(France) Lilou Ruel
(Netherlands) Noa Diorgina

== List of winners ==
Year	Date	Location	Champion	Second	Third	Best Trick
2007	6 October	Vienna, Austria	(United Kingdom) Ryan Doyle	(United States) Victor Lopez	(Sweden) Marcus Gustafsson	(United Kingdom) Ryan Doyle
2009	22 May	Vienna, Austria	(United Kingdom) Paul Joseph	(United Kingdom) Tim Shieff	(Sweden) Marcus Gustafsson	(Bulgaria) Delyan Dimitrov
2009	22 August	Helsingborg, Sweden	(Bulgaria) Delyan Dimitrov	(Germany) Jason Paul	(United Kingdom) Tim Shieff	(Bulgaria) Delyan Dimitrov
2010	7 May	Vienna, Austria	(Germany) Jason Paul	(France) Yoann Leroux	(Latvia) Pavel Petkuns	(Latvia) Pavel Petkuns
2010	11 September	(United States) Tampa, USA	(France) Yoann Leroux	(Germany) Jason Paul	(United States) Kyle Mendoza	(United States) Marvin Ross
2010	17 September	(United States) Boston, USA	(Germany) Jason Paul	(United Kingdom) Pip Andersen	(Sweden) Marcus Gustafsson	(Germany) Jason Paul
2011	20 March	(United Kingdom) London, Great Britain	(United Kingdom) Tim Shieff	(Sweden) Marcus Gustafsson	(United Kingdom) Ryan Doyle	(Russia) Erik Mukhametshin
2011	30 July	Yokohama, Japan	(Germany) Jason Paul	(Latvia) Pavel Petkuns	(United Kingdom) Kie Willis	(United Kingdom) Kie Willis
2011	13 August	São Paulo, Brazil	(United Kingdom) Ryan Doyle	(Germany) Jason Paul	(United Kingdom) Tim Shieff	(Sweden) Cato Aspmo
2011	28 August	(United States) Detroit, USA	(Sweden) Marcus Gustafsson	(United Kingdom) Tim Shieff	(United Kingdom) Pip Andersen	(United States) Marvin Ross
2011	9 October	Santorini, Greece	(Latvia) Pavel Petkuns	(France) Yoann Leroux	(Belgium) Gaetan Bouillet	(Switzerland) Paulo Tavares
2012	8 September	Lavertezzo, Switzerland	(Latvia) Pavel Petkuns	(Latvia) Slava Petin	(United States) Josh Yadon	(Latvia) Pavel Petkuns
2012	28 September	Santorini, Greece	(Latvia) Pavel Petkuns	(Sweden) Marcus Gustafsson	(Germany) Jason Paul	(Russia) Alexander Zyulev
2013	14 September	Santorini, Greece	(United States) Cory DeMeyers	(Russia) Alexander Baiturin	(United States) Jesse La Flair	(United States) Jesse La Flair
2014	4 October	Santorini, Greece	(Greece) Dimitris Kyrsanidis	(Latvia) Pavel Petkuns	(Russia) Alexander Baiturin	(Russia) Alexander Baiturin
2015	3 October	Santorini, Greece	(Greece) Dimitris Kyrsanidis	(Latvia) Pavel Petkuns	(Canada) Jesse Peveril	(United States) Alfred Scott
2016	1 October	Santorini, Greece	(Netherlands) Bart van der Linden	(United States) Alfred Scott	(United States) Joey Adrian	(United States) Alfred Scott
2017	7 October	Santorini, Greece	(Ukraine) Alexander Titarenko	(United States) Nathan Weston	(Greece) Dimitris Kyrsanidis	(Ukraine) Alexander Titarenko
2019	5 October	Matera, Italy	(Morocco) Didi Alaoui	(United Kingdom) Edward Scott	(Greece) Dimitris Kyrsanidis	(Morocco) Didi Alaoui
2021	10 July	Pireaus, Greece	(Poland) Krystian Kowalewski	(United Kingdom) Edward Scott	(Russia) Evgeny Aroyan	(Poland) Krystian Kowalewski
2022	12 June	Astypalea, Greece	(United Kingdom) Travis Verkaik	(United Kingdom) Edward Scott	(Sweden) Elis Torhall	(Sweden) Elis Torhall

== Best Female ==
Year	Location	Champion	Second	Third	Best Trick
2012	Santorini, Greece	(United States) Luci Romberg	(Austria) Pamela Forster	(United States) Erica Madrid	-
2013	Santorini, Greece	(Russia) Aleksandra Shevchenko (Austria) Pamela Forster	-	(United States) Erica Madrid	-
2014	Santorini, Greece	(United States) Luci Romberg	(Russia) Aleksandra Shevchenko	(Austria) Pamela Forster	-
2015	Santorini, Greece	(United States) Luci Romberg	(Austria) Pamela Forster	-	-
2016	Santorini, Greece	(Luxembourg) Lynn Jung	(United States) Sydney Olson	(Austria) Pamela Forster	-
2017	Santorini, Greece	(Russia) Aleksandra Shevchenko	(Austria) Pamela Forster	-	-
2019	Matera, Italy	(United States) Sydney Olson	(Russia) Aleksandra Shevchenko	(Germany) Silke Sollfrank	-
2021	Pireaus, Greece	(Netherlands) Noa Diorgina	(France) Lilou Ruel	(United Kingdom) Elise Bickley	(France) Lilou Ruel
2022	Astypalea, Greece	(United States) Sydney Olson	(France) Lilou Ruel	(Netherlands) Noa Diorgina (Sweden) Miranda Tibbling	

== Video Competition 2011 ==
Failaka Island, Kuwait

Champion	Second	Third
Team Warbah	Team Qaruh	Team Miskan
(United Kingdom) Tim Shieff	(United Kingdom) Ryan Doyle	(Austria) Tunc Uysaler
(United Kingdom) Will Sutton	(United Kingdom) Kie Willis	(Thailand) Anan Anwar
(Spain) Sergio Cora	(Australia) Shaun Wood	(United States) Justin Sheaffer
(Switzerland) Kevin Fluri	(United States) Vinnie Coryell	(Kuwait) Mohammad Al Attar

== Best Trick Table ==
Men

Rank	Country	Number
1	(United States) USA	5
2	Russia	3
3	(United Kingdom) Great Britain	2
3	Bulgaria	2
3	Latvia	2
3	Sweden	2
7	Switzerland	1
7	Germany	1
7	Ukraine	1
7	Morocco	1
7	Poland	1

Women

Rank	Country	Number
1	France	1

== Medal table (Countries) ==
- Men

Rank	Nation	Gold	Silver	Bronze	Total
1	Great Britain (GBR)	5	6	5	16
2	Latvia (LAT)	3	4	1	8
3	Germany (GER)	3	3	1	7
4	Greece (GRE)	2	0	2	4
5	United States (USA)	1	3	4	8
6	Sweden (SWE)	1	2	4	7
7	France (FRA)	1	2	0	3
8	Bulgaria (BUL)	1	0	0	1
8	Morocco (MAR)	1	0	0	1
8	Netherlands (NED)	1	0	0	1
8	Poland (POL)	1	0	0	1
8	Ukraine (UKR)	1	0	0	1
13	Russia (RUS)	0	1	2	3
14	Belgium (BEL)	0	0	1	1
14	Canada (CAN)	0	0	1	1
Totals (15 entries)		21	21	21	63

- Women

Rank	Nation	Gold	Silver	Bronze	Total
1	United States (USA)	5	1	2	8
2	Russia (RUS)	2	2	0	4
3	Austria (AUT)	1	3	2	6
4	Netherlands (NED)	1	0	1	2
5	Luxembourg (LUX)	1	0	0	1
6	France (FRA)	0	2	0	2
7	Germany (GER)	0	0	1	1
7	Great Britain (GBR)	0	0	1	1
7	Sweden (SWE)	0	0	1	1
Totals (9 entries)		10	8	8	26

== Medal table (Athletes) ==
Men
Rank	Athlete	Gold	Silver	Bronze	Total
1	(Germany) Jason Paul	3	3	1	7
1	(Latvia) Pavel Petkuns	3	3	1	7
3	(Greece) Dimitris Kyrsanidis	2	0	2	4
4	(United Kingdom) Ryan Doyle	2	0	1	3
5	(Sweden) Marcus Gustafsson	1	2	3	6
6	(United Kingdom) Tim Shieff	1	2	2	5
7	(France) Yoann Leroux	1	2	0	3
8	(Ukraine) Alexander Titarenko	1	0	0	1
8	(Netherlands) Bart van der Linden	1	0	0	1
8	(United States) Cory DeMeyers	1	0	0	1
8	(Bulgaria) Delyan Dimitrov	1	0	0	1
8	(Morocco) Didi Alaoui	1	0	0	1
8	(Poland) Krystian Kowalewski	1	0	0	1
8	(United Kingdom) Paul Joseph	1	0	0	1
8	(United Kingdom) Travis Verkaik	1	0	0	1
16	(United Kingdom) Edward Scott	0	3	0	3
17	(Russia) Alexander Baiturin	0	1	1	2
17	(United Kingdom) Pip Andersen	0	1	1	2
19	(United States) Alfred Scott	0	1	0	1
19	(United States) Nathan Weston	0	1	0	1
19	(Latvia) Slava Petin	0	1	0	1
19	(United States) Victor Lopez	0	1	0	1
23	(Sweden) Elis Torhall	0	0	1	1
23	(Russia) Evgeny Aroyan	0	0	1	1
23	(Belgium) Gaetan Bouillet	0	0	1	1
23	(United States) Jesse La Flair	0	0	1	1
23	(Canada) Jesse Peveril	0	0	1	1
23	(United States) Joey Adrian	0	0	1	1
23	(United States) Josh Yadon	0	0	1	1
23	(United Kingdom) Kie Willis	0	0	1	1
23	(United States) Kyle Mendoza	0	0	1	1
Totals (31 entries)		21	21	21	63

Women
Rank	Athlete	Gold	Silver	Bronze	Total
1	(United States) Luci Romberg	3	0	0	3
2	(Russia) Aleksandra Shevchenko	2	2	0	4
3	(United States) Sydney Olson	2	1	0	3
4	(Austria) Pamela Forster	1	3	2	6
5	(Netherlands) Noa Diorgina	1	0	1	2
6	(Luxembourg) Lynn Jung	1	0	0	1
7	(France) Lilou Ruel	0	2	0	2
8	(United States) Erica Madrid	0	0	2	2
9	(United Kingdom) Elise Bickley	0	0	1	1
9	(Sweden) Miranda Tibbling	0	0	1	1
9	(Germany) Silke Sollfrank	0	0	1	1
Totals (11 entries)		10	8	8	26

== Santorini Series (2011-2017) ==
=== 2011 ===
- First Run

Rank	Athlete	Points
1	(Germany) Jason Paul	494
2	(Latvia) Pavel Petkuns	468
3	(United Kingdom) Pip Andersen	454
4	(France) Yoann Leroux	450
4	(Switzerland) Paulo Tavares	450
6	(Belgium) Gaetan Bouillet	449

Rank	Athlete
7	(United Kingdom) Kie Willis
8	(Sweden) Marcus Gustafsson
9	(Spain) Sergio Cora
10	(Portugal) Luis Alkmim
11	(Switzerland) Christian Harmat
12	(Spain) Pablo Lopez
13	(Austria) Tunc Leech Uysaler
14	(Spain) Aral Loca Lopez
15	(Greece) Zaza Markhulia

- Final Run

Rank	Athlete	Points
1	(Latvia) Pavel Petkuns	485
2	(France) Yoann Leroux	479
3	(Belgium) Gaetan Bouillet	473

Rank	Athlete
4	(Germany) Jason Paul
5	(Switzerland) Paulo Tavares
6	(Sweden) Marcus Gustafsson
7	(United Kingdom) Kie Willis
8	(United Kingdom) Pip Andersen

Gaetan Bouillet & Paulo Tavares - The athletes did not participate on the AOM 2012

- Green color indicates and prizers athletes who automatically come to the AOM 2012

=== 2012 ===
- Rules. In the first run involved 21 athletes, where, after judicial decisions go into the final eight athletes who automatically get to the next AOM

Online qualification (Men)

Name
(Russia) Alexander Zyulev
(Switzerland) Kevin Fluri
(Brazil) Paulo Victor Freitas
(Portugal) Luis Alkmim

Online qualification (Women)

Name
(United States) Erica Madrid
(Austria) Pamela Forster
(United States) Luci Romberg

Prizers AOM 2012 in Lavertezzo, Switzerland.

Name
(Latvia) Slava Petin
(United States) Josh Yadon

On-site qualification

Name
(Canada) Jesse Peveril
(United States) Cory DeMeyers
(Greece) Sergios Doumanis
(United Kingdom) Nathan Jones

First Run

Rank	Athlete	Points
1	(Latvia) Pavel Petkuns	449
2	(Sweden) Marcus Gustafsson	434
3	(United Kingdom) Ryan Doyle	432
4	(France) Yoann Leroux	430
5	(Portugal) Luis Alkmim	423
5	(Russia) Alexander Zyulev	423
7	(Germany) Jason Paul	421
8	(United States) Luci Romberg	416
9	(United States) Cory DeMeyers	412
10	(United Kingdom) Tim Shieff	409
11	(United Kingdom) Kie Willis	405
12	(United States) Josh Yadon	404
12	(United Kingdom) Pip Andersen	404
14	(Brazil) Paulo Victor Freitas	397
15	(Greece) Sergios Doumanis	395
16	(Latvia) Slava Petin	384
17	(Switzerland) Kevin Fluri	382
18	(United Kingdom) Nathan Jones	370
19	(Austria) Pamela Forster	351
20	(Canada) Jesse Peveril	344
21	(United States) Erica Madrid	308

- Green color indicates athletes who have reached the final, and automatically come to the AOM 2013

Final Run

Rank	Athlete	Points
1	(Latvia) Pavel Petkuns	455
2	(Sweden) Marcus Gustafsson	436
3	(Germany) Jason Paul	434
4	(France) Yoann Leroux	419
5	(Portugal) Luis Alkmim	404
6	(Russia) Alexander Zyulev	401
7	(United States) Luci Romberg	372
8	(United Kingdom) Ryan Doyle	366

Jason Paul, Luci Romberg & Ryan Doyle - The athletes did not participate on the AOM 2013

=== 2013 ===
- Rules: 18 athletes compete, 8 go to the finals and those 8 automatically get to go to the next year's AOM.
- Judges

Name	Criteria
(United Kingdom) Tim Shieff	Creativity
(United States) Victor Lopez	Difficulty
(Thailand) Anan Anwar	Execution
(Spain) Sergio Cora	Flow
(Austria) Patrick Morawetz	Head Judge

Online qualification (Men)

Name
(Netherlands) Bart van der Linden
(Greece) Dimitris Kyrsanidis
(United States) Vincent Coryell

Online qualification (Women)

Name
(United States) Erica Madrid
(Austria) Pamela Forster
(Russia) Aleksandra Shevchenko

On-site qualification

Name
(United States) Cory DeMeyers
(Russia) Alexander Baiturin
(Switzerland) Joel Eggimann
(Latvia) Stanislavs Lazdans
(United Kingdom) Luke Madigan
(Greece) Daniel Mircea

- Notes
  - (United States) Jesse La Flair won an instant qualification to the AOM through making third place in the Air Wipp challenge that year

First Run

Rank	Athlete	Points
1	(United States) Jesse La Flair	517
2	(United States) Cory DeMeyers	463
3	(Switzerland) Joel Eggimann	456
4	(Latvia) Stanislavs Lazdans	452
5	(Greece) Dimitris Kyrsanidis	451
6	(Greece) Daniel Mircea	450
7	(Russia) Alexander Baiturin	432
8	(France) Yoann Leroux	426
9	(United Kingdom) Luke Madigan	419
10	(United States) Vincent Coryell	412
11	(Netherlands) Bart van der Linden	404
12	(Portugal) Luis Alkmim	401
13	(Russia) Alexander Zyulev	400
14	(Sweden) Marcus Gustafsson	398
15	(Russia) Aleksandra Shevchenko	378
15	(Austria) Pamela Forster	378
17	(United States) Erika Madrid	351
18	(Latvia) Pavel Petkuns	Injury

- Green color indicates athletes who have reached the final, and automatically come to the AOM 2014

Final Run

Rank	Athlete	Points
1	(United States) Cory DeMeyers	449
2	(Russia) Alexander Baiturin	447
3	(United States) Jesse La Flair	443
4	(France) Yoann Leroux	412
5	(Switzerland) Joel Eggimann	389
6	(Latvia) Stanislavs Lazdans	382
7	(Greece) Dimitris Kyrsanidis	381
8	(Greece) Daniel Mircea	378

=== 2014 ===
- Rules. 18 athletes are divided into 3 groups of 6. After the first run from each group 2 of the best athletes in the final, and automatically get the next AOM.
- Judges

Name	Criteria
(Thailand) Anan Anwar	Creativity
(United States) Gabriel Nunez	Difficulty
(United Kingdom) Kie Willis	Execution
(Spain) Sergio Cora	Flow
(Austria) Patrick Morawetz	Head Judge

Online qualification (Men)

Name
(Russia) Zelimkhan Dzhabrailov
(Latvia) Pavel Petkuns
(Austria) Alexander Schauer

Online qualification (Women)

Name
(United States) Luci Romberg
(Austria) Pamela Forster
(Russia) Aleksandra Shevchenko

On-site qualification

Name
(Spain) Pedro Leon Gomez
(Poland) Kamil Tobiasz
(Greece) Alexandros Bilionis
(Canada) Jesse Peveril

First Run

- Group 1

Rank	Athlete	Points
1	(Canada) Jesse Peveril	471
2	(Austria) Alexander Schauer	445
3	(United States) Cory DeMeyers	439
4	(Latvia) Stanislavs Lazdans	438
5	(Greece) Daniel Mircea	396
6	(Austria) Pamela Forster	373

- Group 2

Rank	Athlete	Points
1	(Greece) Dimitris Kyrsanidis	486
2	(Russia) Alexander Baiturin	480
3	(United States) Luci Romberg	466
4	(Spain) Pedro Leon Gomez	464
5	(Russia) Zelimkhan Dzhabrailov	452
6	(Switzerland) Joel Eggimann	449

- Group 3

Rank	Athlete	Points
1	(France) Yoann Leroux	460
2	(Latvia) Pavel Petkuns	454
3	(United States) Jesse La Flair	453
4	(Poland) Kamil Tobiasz	434
5	(Greece) Alexandros Bilionis	429
6	(Russia) Aleksandra Shevchenko	391

- Green color indicates athletes who have reached the final, and automatically come to the AOM 2015

Final Run

Rank	Athlete	Points
1	(Greece) Dimitris Kyrsanidis	494
2	(Latvia) Pavel Petkuns	484
3	(Russia) Alexander Baiturin	465
4	(France) Yoann Leroux	464
5	(Canada) Jesse Peveril	429
6	(Austria) Alexander Schauer	374

=== 2015 ===
- Judges

Name	Criteria
(Thailand) Anan Anwar	Creativity
(United States) Gabriel Nunez	Difficulty
(United Kingdom) Kie Willis	Execution
(Spain) Sergio Cora	Flow
(Austria) Patrick Morawetz	Head Judge

Online qualification (4 men & 3 women). From 3 to 9 August 2015 announced the winners of each day in the online qualification.

Date	Name	Man/Woman
3 August	(Spain) Pedro Leon Gomez	Man
4 August	(United States) Luci Romberg	Woman
5 August	(Morocco) Didi Alaoui	Man
6 August	(Austria) Pamela Forster	Woman
7 August	(United States) Dante Grazioli	Man
8 August	(Luxembourg) Lynn Jung	Woman
9 August	(United States) Alfred Scott	Man

Lynn Jung doesn't take part in competition.

- 16 August 2015 determine the winner of the Audience Award in the online selection which will be paid for flights and accommodation for qualifying for the location 1 October 2015 in Santorini - (United States) Cory DeMeyers

On-site qualification

Name
(Russia) Erik Mukhametshin
(Germany) Jason Paul
(Morocco) Acraf Dibani
(Sweden) Johan Stahle
(Australia) Dominic Di Tommaso
(United States) Bob Reese

First Run

- Group 1

Rank	Athlete	Points
1	(France) Yoann Leroux	435
2	(United States) Alfred Scott	417
3	(Russia) Erik Mukhametshin	415
4	(Spain) Pedro Leon Gomez	400
5	(Russia) Alexander Baiturin	386
6	(United States) Bob Reese	351

- Group 2

Rank	Athlete	Points
1	(Austria) Alexander Schauer	472
2	(Latvia) Pavel Petkuns	414
3	(United States) Luci Romberg	396
4	(Morocco) Achraf Dibani	358
5	(United States) Dante Grazioli	355
6	(Sweden) Johan Stahle	309

- Group 3

Rank	Athlete	Points
1	(Greece) Dimitris Kyrsanidis	445
2	(Canada) Jesse Peveril	429
3	(Morocco) Didi Alaoui	425
4	(Australia) Dominic Di Tommaso	424
5	(Germany) Jason Paul	414
6	(Austria) Pamela Forster	343

- Green color indicates athletes who have reached the final, and automatically come to the AOM 2016

Final Run

Rank	Athlete	Points
1	(Greece) Dimitris Kyrsanidis	467
2	(Latvia) Pavel Petkuns	436
3	(Canada) Jesse Peveril	422
4	(Austria) Alexander Schauer	402
5	(France) Yoann Leroux	380
6	(United States) Alfred Scott	317

=== 2016 ===
Judges

Name	Criteria
(Sweden) Marcus Gustafsson	Overall Performance
(United States) Gabriel Nunez	Difficulty
(Thailand) Anan Anwar	Creativity
(Spain) Sergio Cora	Flow
(United Kingdom) Kie Willis	Execution
(Austria) Patrick Morawetz	Head Judge

Online qualification (Men)

Name
(Spain) Pedro Leon Gomez
(United States) Joey Adrian
(Portugal) Pedro Salgado
(United States) Calen Chan

Online qualification (Women)

Name
(United States) Sydney Olson
(Austria) Pamela Forster
(Luxembourg) Lynn Jung

- By voting on the website of Red bull gets a chance to qualify on-site - (Morocco) Mehdi Moussaid (over 7000 votes)

On-site qualification

Name
(Australia) Dominic Di Tommaso
(Netherlands) Bart van der Linden
(Russia) Nikita Teterev
(United States) Nathan Weston
(Finland) Valtteri Luoma-aho
(United States) Cory DeMeyers

(Austria) Alexander Schauer had injury and will not participate in AoM 2016. His place will take part (United States) Cory DeMeyers

First Run

- Group 1

Rank	Athlete	Points
1	(United States) Calen Chan	401
2	(United States) Nathan Weston	384
3	(Australia) Dominic Di Tommaso	372
4	(United States) Cory DeMeyers	339
5	(United States) Sydney Olson	319
6	(Canada) Jesse Peveril	305

- Group 2

Rank	Athlete	Points
1	(Netherlands) Bart van der Linden	369
2	(Portugal) Pedro Salgado	367
3	(Spain) Pedro Leon Gomez	357
4	(Latvia) Pavel Petkuns	348
5	(France) Yoann Leroux	331
6	(Luxembourg) Lynn Jung	323

- Group 3

Rank	Athlete	Points
1	(United States) Joey Adrian	403
2	(United States) Alfred Scott	402
3	(Greece) Dimitris Kyrsanidis	401
4	(Finland) Valtteri Luoma-aho	355
5	(Russia) Nikita Teterev	342
6	(Austria) Pamela Forster	299

- Green color indicates athletes who have reached the final, and automatically come to the AOM 2017

Final Run

Rank	Athlete	Points
1	(Netherlands) Bart van der Linden	383
2	(United States) Alfred Scott	379
3	(United States) Joey Adrian	376
4	(United States) Calen Chan	369
5	(Portugal) Pedro Salgado	359
6	(United States) Nathan Weston	350

=== 2017 ===
Judges:

Name	Criteria
(Sweden) Marcus Gustafsson	Overall Performance
(United States) Gabriel Nunez	Difficulty
(Thailand) Anan Anwar	Creativity
(Spain) Sergio Cora	Flow
(United Kingdom) Kie Willis	Execution
(Austria) Patrick Morawetz	Head Judge

Online qualification (4 men & 3 women). From 12 to 18 July 2017 announced the winners of each day in the online qualification.

Date	Name	Man/Woman
12 July	(Greece) Dimitris Kyrsanidis	Man
13 July	(United States) Sydney Olson	Woman
14 July	(United States) Jeff Garrido	Man
15 July	(Russia) Aleksandra Shevchenko	Woman
16 July	(Latvia) Stanislavs Lazdans	Man
17 July	(Austria) Pamela Forster	Woman
18 July	(Finland) Valtteri Luoma-aho	Man

- With 19954 votes (Brazil) Andre Luiz Freitas wins a trip to Santorini! He will get a chance to prove himself at the Red Bull Art of Motion On-site Qualifier 2017
- (Latvia) Stanislavs Lazdans had injury and will not participate in AoM 2017. His place will take part (Poland) Krystian Kowalewski

Top 20 On-site athletes :

- Green color indicates athletes who won On-site qualification and will participate in main event of AoM 2017

Name
(Switzerland) Charles Luong
(Switzerland) Aaron Vivar
(United Kingdom) Edward Scott
(Austria) Alexander Schauer
(Spain) Pedro Leon Gomez
(Spain) Yesay Ayala
(United States) Corbin Reinhardt
(United States) Bob Reese
(Australia) Dominic Di Tommaso
(Morocco) Didi Alaoui
(Germany) Matthias Mayer
(Russia) Kirya Kolesnikov
(Finland) Onni Pouhtari
(Latvia) Pavel Petkuns
(Germany) Waldemar Muller
(Poland) Kamil Tobiasz
(Greece) Gabriel Mircea
(Japan) Sato Kenichi
(Ukraine) Alexander Titarenko
(United Kingdom) Benjamin Cave

- (Poland) Krystian Kowalewski had injury and will not participate in AoM 2017. His place will take part (Australia) Dominic Di Tommaso
- (United States) Sydney Olson won't be able to compete. Last minute replacement is (Poland) Kamil Tobiasz who placed 7th in the Onsite Qualifier.

First Run

- Group 1

Rank	Athlete	Points
1	(Portugal) Pedro Salgado	397
2	(Finland) Valtteri Luoma-aho	389
3	(Austria) Alexander Schauer	384
4	(United States) Alfred Scott	377
5	(Switzerland) Charles Luong	347
6	(Austria) Pamela Forster	303

- Group 2

Rank	Athlete	Points
1	(United States) Nathan Weston	400
2	(Greece) Dimitris Kyrsanidis	391
3	(Netherlands) Bart van der Linden	342
4	(United Kingdom) Edward Scott	334
5	(Poland) Kamil Tobiasz	323
6	(Australia) Dominic Di Tommaso	312

- Group 3

Rank	Athlete	Points
1	(United States) Calen Chan	381
2	(Ukraine) Alexander Titarenko	380
3	(United States) Joey Adrian	373
4	(United States) Jeff Garrido	364
5	(Morocco) Didi Alaoui	350
6	(Russia) Aleksandra Shevchenko	342

- Green color indicates athletes who have reached the final.

Final Run

Rank	Athlete	Points
1	(Ukraine) Alexander Titarenko	418
2	(United States) Nathan Weston	386
3	(Greece) Dimitris Kyrsanidis	384
4	(United States) Calen Chan	346
5	(Portugal) Pedro Salgado	330
6	(Finland) Valtteri Luoma-aho	309

== Matera 2019 ==
12 men and 6 women will compete on AoM 2019 in (Italy) Matera. Participants will include the winners of the 2017 Red Bull Art of Motion and other international competitions (Air Wipp Challenge, NAPC and Lion City), an Italian wildcard alongside winners of the online and onsite qualifications.

Judges:

Name	Criteria
(Sweden) Marcus Gustafsson	Overall Impression
(United States) Gabriel Nunez	Difficulty
(Thailand) Anan Anwar	Creativity
(Spain) Sergio Cora	Flow
(United Kingdom) Kie Willis	Execution
(Austria) Patrick Morawetz	Head Judge

Participants (Golden Ticket):

Name of winner	Competition	Place	Date	Year
(Ukraine) Alexander Titarenko	Red Bull Art of Motion	(Greece) Santorini	October, 7	2017
(Poland) Krystian Kowalewski	Air Wipp Challenge	(Sweden) Helsingborg	November, 10	2018
(United Kingdom) Edward Scott	NAPC 7 Style	(Canada) Vancouver	August, 18	2019
(United States) Nathan Weston*	Lion City Gathering	Singapore	September, 15	2019
(Italy) Fausto Vicari	Italian Wildcard	All Italy	September	2019

- (United States) Nathan Weston (2nd runner-up) qualifies for AoM 2019 via Asian Parkour Championship as (Thailand) Montree Bowdok (Winner) & (Japan) Yurai Miyazaki (1st runner-up) have pre-qualified through online qualification.

Online qualification (4 men & 4 women):

Name
Men
(Morocco) Didi Alaoui
(Russia) Evgeny Aroyan
(Thailand) Montree Bowdok
(Japan) Yurai Miyazaki
Women
(United States) Sydney Olson
(Russia) Aleksandra Shevchenko
(France) Lilou Ruel
(Germany) Silke Sollfrank

On-site qualification (3 men & 2 women)

Name
Men
(Austria) Stefan Dollinger
(United States) Joshua Malone
(Greece) Dimitris Kyrsanidis
Women
(Turkey) Hazal Nehir
(Brazil) Camila Stefaniu

- (Ukraine) Alexander Titarenko & (Austria) Stefan Dollinger not involved due to injuries. Their places have been taken by (Australia) Dominic Di Tommaso & (Switzerland) Charles Luong

First Run

  D - Difficulty
  E - Execution
  F - Flow 
  C - Creativity
  OI - Overall Impression

- Group 1

Rank	Athlete	Points	D	E	F	C	OI
1	(Poland) Krystian Kowalewski	410	77	92	85	74	82
2	(United States) Nathan Weston	388	74	87	74	67	86
3	(United States) Joshua Malone	370	85	68	70	70	77
4	(Germany) Silke Sollfrank	313	55	78	63	60	57
5	(Brazil) Camila Stefaniu	288	57	81	58	38	54
6	(Italy) Fausto Vicari	286	60	48	65	50	63

- Group 2

Rank	Athlete	Points	D	E	F	C	OI
1	(United Kingdom) Edward Scott	429	90	89	86	74	90
2	(Greece) Dimitris Kyrsanidis	413	88	82	83	72	88
3	(Russia) Evgeny Aroyan	405	74	91	81	76	83
4	(Thailand) Montree Bowdok	368	80	70	79	65	74
5	(France) Lilou Ruel	277	70	48	54	53	52
6	(Turkey) Hazal Nehir	237	48	45	61	35	48

- Group 3

Rank	Athlete	Points	D	E	F	C	OI
1	(Switzerland) Charles Luong	411	91	92	80	62	86
2	(Morocco) Didi Alaoui	400	95	51	82	84	88
3	(Japan) Yurai Miyazaki	383	88	65	78	73	79
4	(United States) Sydney Olson	353	71	76	73	67	66
5	(Australia) Dominic Di Tommaso	352	68	74	75	60	75
6	(Russia) Aleksandra Shevchenko	320	57	71	69	62	61

- Green color indicates athletes who have reached the final.

Final Run

Rank	Athlete	Points	D	E	F	C	OI
1	(Morocco) Didi Alaoui	428	91	81	86	80	90
2	(United Kingdom) Edward Scott	421	88	89	87	70	87
3	(Greece) Dimitris Kyrsanidis	413	83	91	81	73	85
4	(Poland) Krystian Kowalewski	403	81	90	77	71	84
5	(United States) Nathan Weston	401	75	82	80	78	86
6	(Switzerland) Charles Luong	353	67	83	75	50	78

== Pireaus 2021 ==
Tracers will gather again in 2021 Greece to participate in the main international freerunning competition . The competition will take place in a new location - in the heart of Piraeus, in the port of Microlimano, where participants will have to show their skills on board two huge sailing yachts.

Judges:

Name	Criteria
(Germany) Jason Paul	Creativity
(Portugal) Luis Alkmim	Overall Impression
(United States) Sydney Olson	Difficulty
(Spain) Sergio Cora	Flow
(United Kingdom) Kie Willis	Execution
(Austria) Patrick Morawetz	Head Judge

Participants:

TOP-3 of AoM 2019

Name
(Morocco) Didi Alaoui
(United Kingdom) Edward Scott
(Greece) Dimitris Kyrsanidis

- (Greece) Dimitris Kyrsanidis is injured. His place takes (United States) Joshua Malone.

Online qualification (6 men & 6 women)

Name
Men
(Poland) Krystian Kowalewski
(United States) Bob Reese
(Russia) Evgeny Aroyan
(United States) Shea Rudolph
(Sweden) Elis Torhall
(Italy) Davide Rizzi
Women
(Netherlands) Noa Diorgina
(France) Lilou Ruel
(United Kingdom) Elise Bickley
(Austria) Lisa Schneider
(Sweden) Miranda Tibbling
(Japan) Hanaho Yamamoto

- (Iran) Yasin Hemati qualified but could not attend.

Onsite qualification

Name
(United Kingdom) Travis Verkaik
(United States) Jarrod Luty
(Greece) Mimis Theodoridis

First Run

  D - Difficulty
  E - Execution
  F - Flow 
  C - Creativity
  OI - Overall Impression

- Group 1

Rank	Athlete	Points	D	E	F	C	OI
1	(United States) Bob Reese	395	78	58	74	82	76
2	(Netherlands) Noa Diorgina	366	71	78	72	78	72
3	(United Kingdom) Travis Verkaik	365	79	83	76	53	74
4	(Sweden) Elis Torhall	361	78	81	68	60	74
5	(United States) Joshua Malone	338	70	64	63	73	68
6	(Japan) Hanaho Yamamoto	276	64	62	35	62	53

- Group 2

Rank	Athlete	Points	D	E	F	C	OI
1	(Poland) Krystian Kowalewski	419	86	92	82	80	79
2	(United Kingdom) Edward Scott	396	82	80	73	84	77
3	(Italy) Davide Rizzi	373	75	80	75	66	77
4	(France) Lilou Ruel	346	69	79	58	67	73
5	(Sweden) Miranda Tibbling	299	66	66	64	38	65
6	(United States) Jarrod Luty	DNF	-	-	-	-	-

- (United States) Jarrod Luty got injured while performing.
- Group 3

Rank	Athlete	Points	D	E	F	C	OI
1	(Russia) Evgeny Aroyan	433	90	93	85	83	82
2	(Morocco) Didi Alaoui	401	87	78	76	81	79
3	(Greece) Mimis Theodoridis	400	80	88	86	67	79
4	(United States) Shea Rudolph	371	83	70	83	60	75
5	(United Kingdom) Elise Bickley	319	67	68	65	51	68
6	(Austria) Lisa Schneider	303	58	75	58	45	67

- Green color indicates athletes who have reached the final.

Final Run

Rank	Athlete	Points	D	E	F	C	OI
1	(Poland) Krystian Kowalewski	413	92	85	75	79	82
2	(United Kingdom) Edward Scott	405	84	78	78	85	80
3	(Russia) Evgeny Aroyan	403	88	89	72	76	78
4	(United States) Bob Reese	372	79	79	73	72	75
5	(Netherlands) Noa Diorgina	309	61	72	48	60	68
6	(Morocco) Didi Alaoui	DNF	-	-	-	-	-

- (Morocco) Didi Alaoui refused to continue performing after an unsuccessful jump.

== Astypalea 2022 ==
The new three-day contest format (June 9-12).

Judges:

Name	Criteria
(Germany) Jason Paul	Creativity
(Portugal) Luis Alkmim	Overall Impression
(United States) Luci Romberg	Difficulty
(Austria) Alexander Schauer	Flow
(United Kingdom) Kie Willis	Execution
(Austria) Patrick Morawetz	Head Judge

Participants:

- TOP-3 of AoM 2021

Name
(Poland) Krystian Kowalewski
(United Kingdom) Edward Scott
(Russia) Evgeny Aroyan

- Best Female of AoM 2021

Name
(Netherlands) Noa Diorgina

- Invited Athletes

Name
(Australia) Dominic Di Tommaso
(United Kingdom) Travis Verkaik
(United States) Bob Reese
(Morocco) Didi Alaoui
(Japan) Ryuya Kuwasaki
(France) Lilou Ruel
(Sweden) Elis Torhall
(Austria) Stefan Dollinger
(United States) Sydney Olson

- Greek Wildcard

Name
(Greece) Dimitris Kyrsanidis

- Online Qualification

Name
(United States) Aiden Rudolph
(Sweden) Miranda Tibbling

- (United States) Aiden Rudolph and (Morocco) Didi Alaoui are injured. They have replaced by (United States) Shea Rudolph and (Mexico) Ella Bucio.

Final Results

  EC - Exploration Challenge
  SC - Spot Challenge
  LC - Live Challenge
  SP - Summary Points

- Men:

Rank	Athlete	EC	SC	LC	SP
1	(United Kingdom) Travis Verkaik	5	7	3	15
2	(United Kingdom) Edward Scott	7	-	7	14
3	(Sweden) Elis Torhall	1	5	5	11
4	(United States) Shea Rudolph	3	3	-	6
5	(Russia) Evgeny Aroyan	2	-	2	4
6	(United States) Bob Reese	-	2	-	2
7	(Greece) Dimitris Kyrsanidis	-	-	1	1
7	(Austria) Stefan Dollinger	-	1	-	1

- Women:

Rank	Athlete	EC	SC	LC	SP
1	(United States) Sydney Olson	5	7	7	19
2	(France) Lilou Ruel	7	5	5	17
3	(Netherlands) Noa Diorgina	3	5	-	8
3	(Sweden) Miranda Tibbling	3	2	3	8
5	(Mexico) Ella Bucio	1	1	2	4

Awards

Athlete	Award
(Sweden) Elis Torhall	Hardest Hitter
(United Kingdom) Edward Scott	Most Collaborative
(United Kingdom) Travis Verkaik	Athlete's Favorite
(Greece) Dimitris Kyrsanidis	Choice Winner
(Australia) Dominic Di Tommaso	Postman
