= Luci Romberg =

American stuntwoman

Luci Romberg is an American stuntwoman. She is also the co-owner of Tempest Freerunning, a parkour lifestyle brand that also operates multiple training facilities and is based in Los Angeles.

== Personal life ==
Romberg currently lives in Hollywood, California and is a champion gymnast and an all-conference soccer player as well as a practitioner of freerunning.

Romberg graduated from Texas Women's University in 2005 where she received a gymnastics scholarship and studied kinesiology. She has openly spoken about her struggles with bulimia while training as a collegiate gymnast.

== Movie and television career ==
Ms. Romberg works as a professional stuntwoman and is a member of the Stunt Women's Association of Motion Pictures. She often works as a stunt double for Melissa McCarthy. She has acted in several movies, including: Walk Hard: The Dewey Cox Story, Indiana Jones and the Kingdom of the Crystal Skull, Changeling, Identity Thief, Spy, Paranormal Activity: The Ghost Dimension and The Boss.

She has also appeared in many television shows, like: True Blood, Monk, and Terminator: The Sarah Connor Chronicles. In 2010, Romberg was a guest on Last Call with Carson Daly.

Romberg created the short film Tru Beauty: A Luci Romberg Story which detailed her struggle with bulimia and the empowerment she found through freerunning. The film was released in 2016.

== Parkour and freerunning career ==
In 2008, Romberg was invited to join the Los Angeles based Team Tempest Freeruning group. She was the only female member on the team until 2017.

=== Appearances on Sasuke ===
Romberg has appeared on the Japanese TV show and athletic competition Sasuke twice. The first time, she was chosen alongside Levi Meewenburg and Brian Orosco in G4's third American Ninja Challenge to represent the U.S. in Japan for Sasuke 21. There, she became the first woman to clear the Jumping Spider, but failed soon after on the Half-Pipe attack. The next tournament, she was invited back, but was eliminated on the Jumping Spider. Aside from her appearance in the first American Ninja Warrior, where she failed the Pipe Slider, she has not competed in Sasuke since.

=== Red Bull Art of Motion ===
Romberg was the only woman to compete in the Red Bull Art of Motion freerunning competition in 2009. Romberg has since become an eleven-time female world champion of the competition.

== Awards and nominations ==
Romberg had three nominations, with one category win, at the Taurus World Stunt Awards 2014. She was nominated for the Best Overall Stunt for a Stunt Woman for her fall down basement stairs in The Conjuring, and for being hit by a car in Identity Thief, for which she won the category. She was also nominated The Hardest Hit, for her stunt in Identity Thief.
