= 2024 FIG Parkour World Championships =

Parkour competition

- Location: Kitakyushu, Japan
- Start date: November 15, 2024
- End date: November 17, 2024

The 2024 FIG Parkour World Championships was held from November 15 to 17, 2024, in Kitakyushu, Japan.

== Events ==
=== Men ===
Event	Gold	Silver	Bronze
Speed	Caryl Cordt-Moller; Switzerland	Andrea Consolini; Italy	Jaroslav Chum; Czech Republic
Freestyle	Elis Torhall; Sweden	Mutsuhiro Shiohata; Japan	Tangui van Schingen; Netherlands

=== Women ===
Event	Gold	Silver	Bronze
Speed	Ella Bucio; Mexico	Audrey Johnson; United States	Miranda Tibbling; Sweden
Freestyle	Shang Chunsong; China	Ella Bucio; Mexico	Audrey Johnson; United States

== Medal table ==
* Host nation (Japan)

Rank	Nation	Gold	Silver	Bronze	Total
1	Mexico	1	1	0	2
2	Sweden	1	0	1	2
3	China	1	0	0	1
3	Switzerland	1	0	0	1
5	United States	0	1	1	2
6	Italy	0	1	0	1
6	Japan*	0	1	0	1
8	Czech Republic	0	0	1	1
8	Netherlands	0	0	1	1
Totals (9 entries)		4	4	4	12
