= Parkour World Championships =

International parkour tournament

The phrase Parkour World Championships may refer to one of several parkour competitions organized by various global organizations and institutions. Notable current global competitions include the Sport Parkour League World Championships, the International Gymnastics Federation (FIG) World Championships, and the Parkour Earth World Championships. Notable previous competitions include the Red Bull Art of Motion and the Barclaycard World Freerunning Championship.

== FIG Parkour World Championships controversy ==
The International Gymnastics Federation (FIG) added parkour as one of their disciplines in 2017, causing international opposition from the parkour community who wanted to govern themselves.

The inaugural edition of the FIG Parkour World Championships was scheduled to take place at Hiroshima on 3–5 April 2020, but was postponed as a result of the COVID-19 pandemic and was eventually held from October 14, 2022, in Tokyo, Japan.

The second championships were held by the FIG in 2024.

Due to the controversy and backlash surrounding the establishment of the FIG competition, Parkour Earth was formed to launch a competing World Championship, which is scheduled for 2026.

== Sport Parkour League World Championship Editions ==
The Sport Parkour League (SPL) World Championships have been recognized by high profile parkour athletes as the "community recognized parkour world championships."

Year	Edition	Host city	Country
SPL
2022	1st	Vancouver	Canada
2023	2nd	Vancouver	Canada
2024	3rd	Vancouver	Canada
2025	4th	Vancouver	Canada

== FIG Parkour World Championship Editions ==
Year	Edition	Host city	Country
FIG
2022	1st	Tokyo	Japan
2024	2nd	Kitakyushu	Japan

== Parkour Earth World Championship Editions ==
Year	Edition	Host city	Country
Parkour Earth
2026	1st	Brno	Czech Republic
