= Beach handball at the Asian Beach Games =

The Beach handball at the Asian Beach Games is a Beach handball competition of the Asian Beach Games. It was first held in 2008.

== Summary ==
=== Men ===
| # | Year | Host | Final | | | Third place match | | | Teams |
| # | Year | Host | Winner | Score | Runner-up | 3rd place | Score | 4th place | Teams |
| 1 | 2008 | (Indonesia); Bali | Pakistan | 2–1 | Kuwait | Thailand | 2–1 | Qatar | 8 |
| 2 | 2010 | (Oman); Muscat | Athletes from Kuwait | 2–0 | Pakistan | Thailand | 2–1 | Oman | 11 |
| 3 | 2012 | (China); Haiyang | Qatar | 2–0 | Bahrain | Pakistan | 2–1 | Oman | 14 |
| 4 | 2014 | (Thailand); Phuket | Qatar | 2–0 | Oman | Pakistan | 2–1 | Bahrain | 11 |
| 5 | 2016 | (Vietnam); Da Nang | Qatar | 2–1 | Oman | Pakistan | 2–1 | Vietnam | 11 |
| 6 | 2026 | (China); Sanya | Iran | 2–1 | Qatar | Thailand | 2–0 | Bahrain | 14 |

=== Women ===
| # | Year | Host | Final | | | Third place match | | | Teams |
| # | Year | Host | Winner | Score | Runner-up | 3rd place | Score | 4th place | Teams |
| 1 | 2008 | (Indonesia); Bali | China | 2–0 | Thailand | Chinese Taipei | 2–0 | India | 9 |
| 2 | 2010 | (Oman); Muscat | China | No playoffs | Thailand | Vietnam | No playoffs | Japan | 5 |
| 3 | 2012 | (China); Haiyang | China | 2–0 | Chinese Taipei | Vietnam | 2–1 | Thailand | 10 |
| 4 | 2014 | (Thailand); Phuket | Thailand | 2–0 | Chinese Taipei | Vietnam | 2–1 | China | 10 |
| 5 | 2016 | (Vietnam); Da Nang | Vietnam | 2–1 | China | Thailand | 2–0 | Chinese Taipei | 9 |
| 6 | 2026 | (China); Sanya | Vietnam | 2–1 | China | Thailand | 2–0 | Turkmenistan | 8 |

== Medal table ==
=== Total ===
| Rank | Nation | Gold | Silver | Bronze | Total |
|---|---|---|---|---|---|
| 1 | China (CHN) | 3 | 2 | 0 | 5 |
| 2 | Qatar (QAT) | 3 | 1 | 0 | 4 |
| 3 | Vietnam (VIE) | 2 | 0 | 3 | 5 |
| 4 | Thailand (THA) | 1 | 2 | 5 | 8 |
| 5 | Pakistan (PAK) | 1 | 1 | 3 | 5 |
| 6 | Kuwait (KUW) | 1 | 1 | 0 | 2 |
| 7 | Iran (IRI) | 1 | 0 | 0 | 1 |
| 8 | Chinese Taipei (TPE) | 0 | 2 | 1 | 3 |
| 9 | Oman (OMA) | 0 | 2 | 0 | 2 |
| 10 | Bahrain (BRN) | 0 | 1 | 0 | 1 |
| Totals (10 entries) | | 12 | 12 | 12 | 36 |

=== Men ===
| Rank | Nation | Gold | Silver | Bronze | Total |
|---|---|---|---|---|---|
| 1 | Qatar (QAT) | 3 | 1 | 0 | 4 |
| 2 | Pakistan (PAK) | 1 | 1 | 3 | 5 |
| 3 | Kuwait (KUW) | 1 | 1 | 0 | 2 |
| 4 | Iran (IRI) | 1 | 0 | 0 | 1 |
| 5 | Oman (OMA) | 0 | 2 | 0 | 2 |
| 6 | Bahrain (BRN) | 0 | 1 | 0 | 1 |
| 7 | Thailand (THA) | 0 | 0 | 3 | 3 |
| Totals (7 entries) | | 6 | 6 | 6 | 18 |

=== Women ===
| Rank | Nation | Gold | Silver | Bronze | Total |
|---|---|---|---|---|---|
| 1 | China (CHN) | 3 | 2 | 0 | 5 |
| 2 | Vietnam (VIE) | 2 | 0 | 3 | 5 |
| 3 | Thailand (THA) | 1 | 2 | 2 | 5 |
| 4 | Chinese Taipei (TPE) | 0 | 2 | 1 | 3 |
| Totals (4 entries) | | 6 | 6 | 6 | 18 |

== Participating nations ==
=== Men ===
| Team | (Indonesia) 2008 | (Oman) 2010 | (China) 2012 | (Thailand) 2014 | (Vietnam) 2016 | (China) 2026 | Years |
|---|---|---|---|---|---|---|---|
| Afghanistan | | 10th | 10th | | 10th | | 3 |
| Bahrain | | 7th | 2nd | 4th | 5th | 4th | 5 |
| Bangladesh | | | | 11th | | 11th | 2 |
| China | | | 6th | | | 8th | 2 |
| Chinese Taipei | | 9th | | | | | 1 |
| Hong Kong | | | 11th | 9th | 8th | 12th | 4 |
| India | | | 9th | 10th | 11th | | 3 |
| Indonesia | 8th | 8th | | | | | 2 |
| Iran | | | | | | 1st | 1 |
| Japan | 7th | 11th | 7th | 6th | 6th | | 5 |
| Jordan | 5th | 6th | | | | 6th | 3 |
| Kuwait | 2nd | 1st | 5th | 5th | | | 4 |
| Maldives | | | | | | 10th | 1 |
| Mongolia | | | 14th | | | 14th | 2 |
| Oman | 6th | 4th | 4th | 2nd | 2nd | 5th | 6 |
| Pakistan | 1st | 2nd | 3rd | 3rd | 3rd | 7th | 6 |
| Philippines | | | | | | 9th | 1 |
| Qatar | 4th | 5th | 1st | 1st | 1st | 2nd | 6 |
| Sri Lanka | | | 13th | | 9th | 13th | 3 |
| Thailand | 3rd | 3rd | 8th | 7th | 7th | 3rd | 6 |
| Vietnam | | | 12th | 8th | 4th | | 3 |
| Teams (21) | 8 | 11 | 14 | 11 | 11 | 14 | _ |

=== Women ===
| Team | (Indonesia) 2008 | (Oman) 2010 | (China) 2012 | (Thailand) 2014 | (Vietnam) 2016 | (China) 2026 | Years |
|---|---|---|---|---|---|---|---|
| Bangladesh | | | | | 9th | | 1 |
| China | 1st | 1st | 1st | 4th | 2nd | 2nd | 6 |
| Chinese Taipei | 3rd | | 2nd | 2nd | 4th | | 4 |
| Hong Kong | 9th | | 7th | 6th | 6th | 5th | 5 |
| India | 4th | | 9th | 10th | 8th | | 4 |
| Indonesia | 8th | 5th | | | | | 2 |
| Japan | 6th | 4th | 5th | 5th | 7th | | 5 |
| Jordan | 7th | | 8th | 7th | 5th | | 4 |
| Mongolia | | | | | | 8th | 1 |
| Philippines | | | 10th | 9th | | 7th | 3 |
| Sri Lanka | | | | | | 6th | 1 |
| Thailand | 2nd | 2nd | 4th | 1st | 3rd | 3rd | 6 |
| Turkmenistan | | | 6th | 8th | | 4th | 3 |
| Vietnam | 5th | 3rd | 3rd | 3rd | 1st | 1st | 6 |
| Teams (14) | 9 | 5 | 10 | 10 | 9 | 8 | _ |
