= Beach handball at the 2014 Asian Beach Games =

- Venue: Karon Beach
- Dates: 15–22 November 2014

Beach handball competition at the 2014 Asian Beach Games was held in Phuket, Thailand from 15 to 22 November 2014 at Karon Beach, Phuket.

== Medalists ==
Event	Gold	Silver	Bronze
Men	Qatar; Ahmed Morgan; Mahmoud Osman; Mohamed Hassan; Anis Zouaoui; Ali Mohamed; Mohsin Yafai; Hani Kakhi; Mohab Mahfouz; Mutasem Mohamed; Sid Kenaoui	Oman; Ashraf Al-Hadidi; Hussain Al-Jabri; Ahmed Al-Hinai; Mazen Al-Dughaishi; Said Al-Hasani; Asad Al-Hasani; Marwan Al-Dughaishi; Hani Al-Dughaishi; Azan Al-Azan; Nasr Al-Tamtami	Pakistan; Tahir Ali; Hazrat Hussain; Ghulam Ali Baloch; Zohaib Jabbar; Muhammad Shahid Pervaiz; Asif Ali; Imran Khan; Khawar Yasin; Muhammad Uzair Atif; Naseer Ahmed
Women	Thailand; Pakakan Thongkot; Pawinee Bunjarern; Vanpen Sila; Viyada Surason; Punpana Manmai; Kwanruedi Srithamma; Orrathai Wongnara; Preeyanut Bureeruk; Panida Nongrueang; Nittaya Joisakoo	Chinese Taipei; Chen Yi-ling; Huang Wei-jung; Yang Ya-ting; Hsu Li-ping; Chia Ling-hui; Lin Ya-ching; Tsai Tzu-hsuan; Chu Chiu-en; Chen Te-jung; Chen Ying-ju	Vietnam; Hà Thị Hạnh; Châu Ngọc Thùy Dung; Lê Thị Thanh Phụng; Nguyễn Kim Oanh; Hứa Thị Thu Nga; Võ Ngọc Hiếu; Nguyễn Thị Kim Thư; Nguyễn Thị Huyền Trang; Đoàn Thị Phương Mỹ; Nguyễn Thị Trà My

== Medal table ==
Rank	Nation	Gold	Silver	Bronze	Total
1	Qatar (QAT)	1	0	0	1
1	Thailand (THA)	1	0	0	1
3	Chinese Taipei (TPE)	0	1	0	1
3	Oman (OMA)	0	1	0	1
5	Pakistan (PAK)	0	0	1	1
5	Vietnam (VIE)	0	0	1	1
Totals (6 entries)		2	2	2	6

== Results ==
=== Men ===
==== Preliminary round ====
===== Group A =====
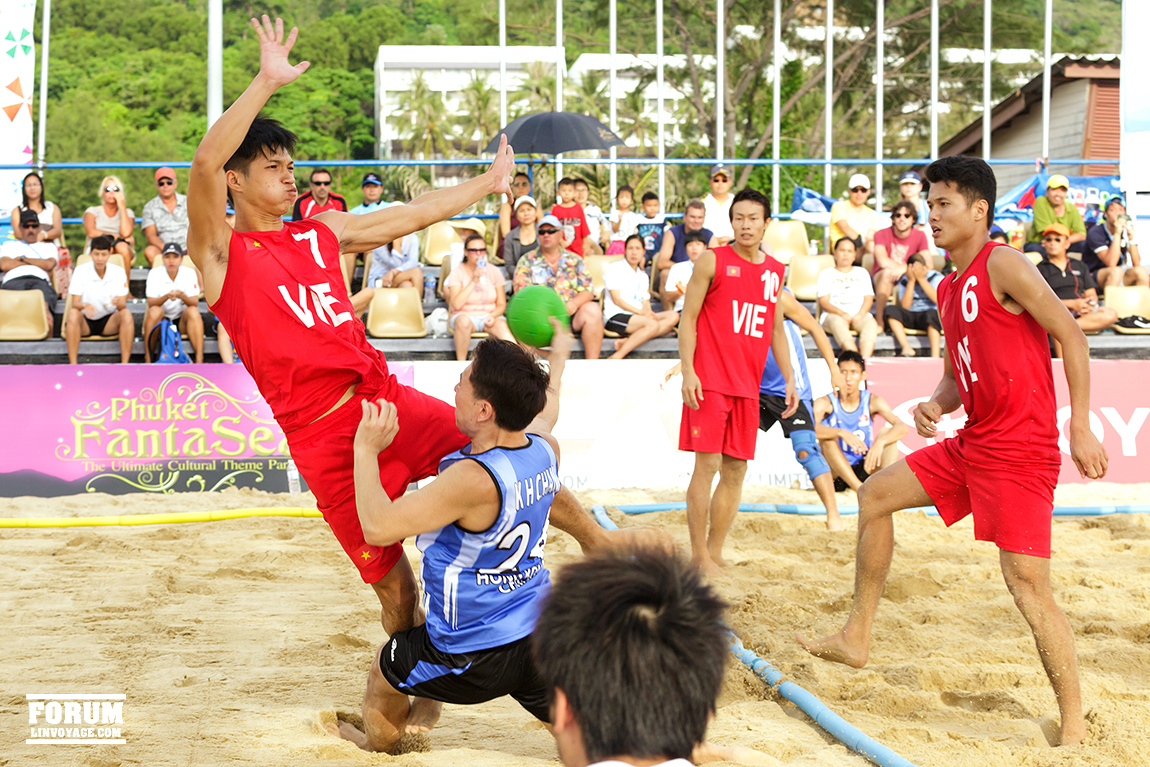
Vietnam vs Hong Kong

Pos	Team	Pld	W	L	SF	SA	SD	Pts
1	Qatar	4	4	0	8	0	+8	8
2	Oman	4	3	1	6	2	+4	6
3	Vietnam	4	2	2	4	4	0	4
4	Japan	4	1	3	2	6	−4	2
5	Hong Kong	4	0	4	0	8	−8	0

Source: AHF

Date	Time		Score		Period 1	Period 2	SO
15 Nov	11:00	Japan	0–2	Qatar	14–21	15–19	
15 Nov	16:00	Vietnam	2–0	Hong Kong	14–11	27–17	
16 Nov	11:00	Qatar	2–0	Hong Kong	23–11	26–10	
16 Nov	16:00	Japan	0–2	Oman	16–26	13–18	
17 Nov	11:00	Oman	2–0	Vietnam	28–15	22–18	
17 Nov	16:00	Hong Kong	0–2	Japan	16–20	14–18	
18 Nov	11:00	Oman	2–0	Hong Kong	19–13	20–7	
18 Nov	16:00	Vietnam	0–2	Qatar	15–24	14–20	
19 Nov	11:00	Vietnam	2–0	Japan	21–18	21–20	
19 Nov	16:00	Qatar	2–0	Oman	16–13	18–14	

===== Group B =====
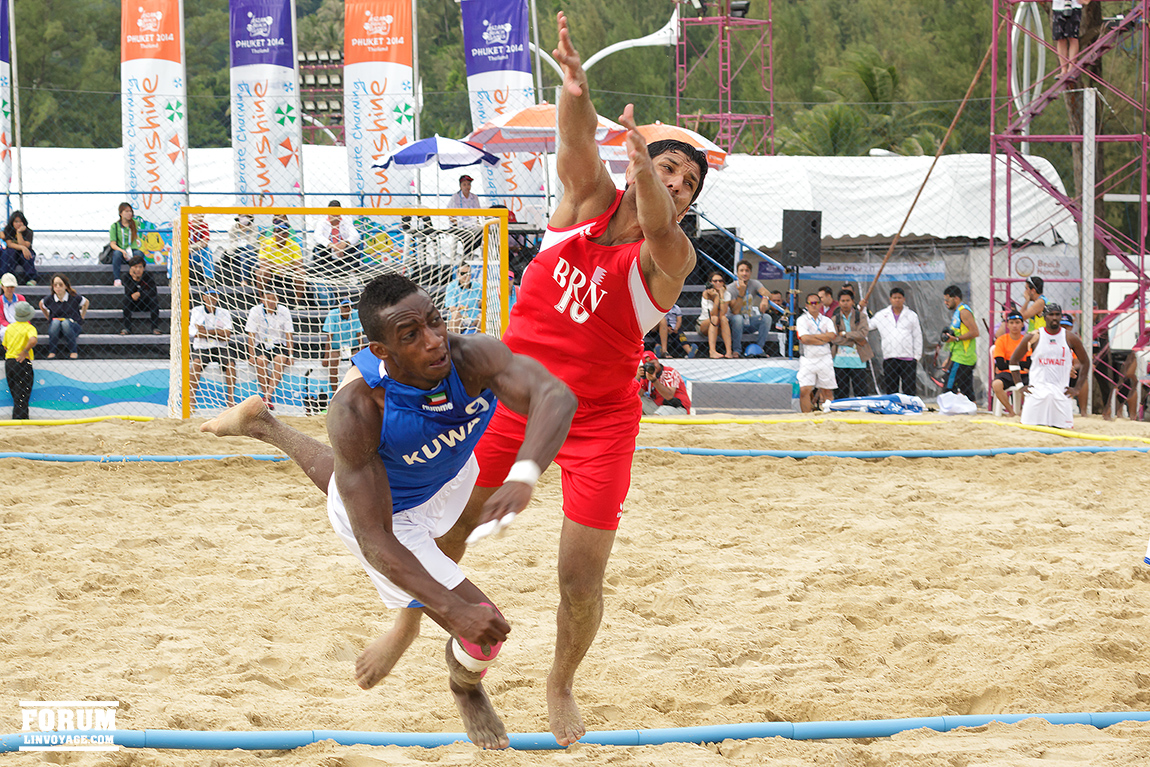
Kuwait vs Bahrain

Pos	Team	Pld	W	L	SF	SA	SD	Pts
1	Pakistan	5	5	0	10	2	+8	10
2	Bahrain	5	4	1	9	2	+7	8
3	Thailand	5	3	2	6	4	+2	6
4	Kuwait	5	2	3	5	6	−1	4
5	India	5	1	4	2	8	−6	2
6	Bangladesh	5	0	5	0	10	−10	0

Source: AHF

Date	Time		Score		Period 1	Period 2	SO
15 Nov	10:00	India	0–2	Pakistan	11–27	9–20	
15 Nov	15:00	Kuwait	0–2	Bahrain	10–15	10–15	
15 Nov	17:00	Thailand	2–0	Bangladesh	20–6	22–10	
16 Nov	10:00	Pakistan	2–1	Kuwait	18–12	10–11	7–4
16 Nov	15:00	Thailand	0–2	Bahrain	9–21	11–15	
16 Nov	17:00	India	2–0	Bangladesh	17–14	18–10	
17 Nov	10:00	Bahrain	2–0	India	22–15	22–16	
17 Nov	15:00	Bangladesh	0–2	Pakistan	5–21	13–22	
17 Nov	17:00	Kuwait	0–2	Thailand	16–17	16–20	
18 Nov	10:00	Kuwait	2–0	India	15–13	20–14	
18 Nov	15:00	Pakistan	2–0	Thailand	22–21	21–20	
18 Nov	17:00	Bahrain	2–0	Bangladesh	24–14	21–9	
19 Nov	10:00	Bangladesh	0–2	Kuwait	13–16	12–14	
19 Nov	15:00	India	0–2	Thailand	20–24	15–16	
19 Nov	17:00	Bahrain	1–2	Pakistan	21–18	19–20	6–8

==== Placement 9th–11th ====
Semifinals
20 November
Hong Kong	2
Bangladesh	0

Placement 9th–10th
21 November
Hong Kong	2
India	0

===== Semifinals =====
Date	Time		Score		Period 1	Period 2	SO
20 Nov	10:00	Hong Kong	2–0	Bangladesh	13–12	16–8	

===== Placement 9th–10th =====
Date	Time		Score		Period 1	Period 2	SO
21 Nov	15:00	Hong Kong	2–0	India	15–13	15–11	

==== Placement 5th–8th ====
Semifinals
20 November
Vietnam	0
Kuwait	2
20 November
Thailand	1
Japan	2

Placement 5th–6th
21 November
Kuwait	2
Japan	0
Placement 7th–8th
21 November
Vietnam	1
Thailand	2

===== Semifinals =====
Date	Time		Score		Period 1	Period 2	SO
20 Nov	11:00	Vietnam	0–2	Kuwait	14–19	16–21	
20 Nov	15:00	Thailand	1–2	Japan	18–19	15–14	6–8

===== Placement 7th–8th =====
Date	Time		Score		Period 1	Period 2	SO
21 Nov	16:00	Vietnam	1–2	Thailand	8–18	14–10	4–5

===== Placement 5th–6th =====
Date	Time		Score		Period 1	Period 2	SO
21 Nov	17:00	Kuwait	2–0	Japan	19–12	19–16	

==== Final round ====
Semifinals
20 November
Qatar	2
Bahrain	0
20 November
Pakistan	0
Oman	2

Gold medal match
22 November
Qatar	2
Oman	0
Bronze medal match
22 November
Bahrain	1
Pakistan	2

===== Semifinals =====
Date	Time		Score		Period 1	Period 2	SO
20 Nov	16:00	Qatar	2–0	Bahrain	21–14	16–13	
20 Nov	17:30	Pakistan	0–2	Oman	14–21	12–20	

===== Bronze medal match =====
Date	Time		Score		Period 1	Period 2	SO
22 Nov	15:00	Bahrain	1–2	Pakistan	13–24	12–11	2–5

===== Gold medal match =====
Date	Time		Score		Period 1	Period 2	SO
22 Nov	17:00	Qatar	2–0	Oman	17–16	16–14	

=== Women ===
==== Preliminary round ====
===== Group A =====
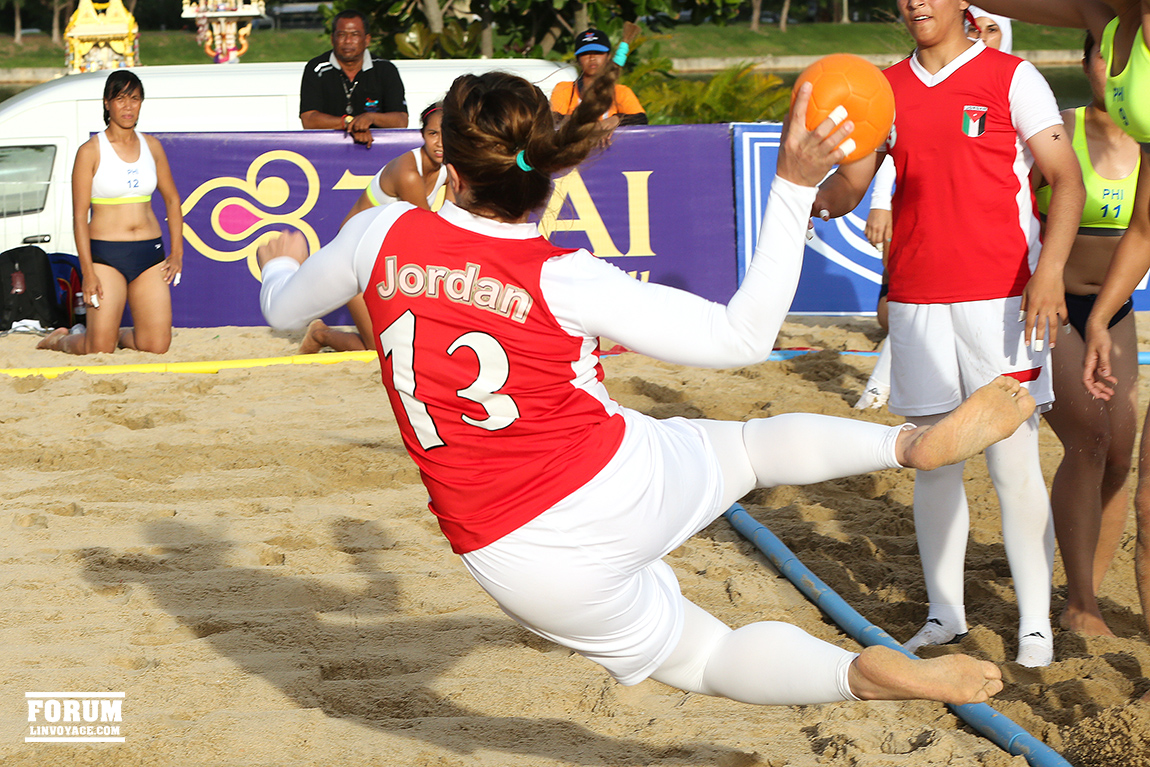
Philippines vs Jordan

Pos	Team	Pld	W	L	SF	SA	SD	Pts
1	Chinese Taipei	4	4	0	8	0	+8	8
2	Vietnam	4	3	1	6	2	+4	6
3	Jordan	4	2	2	4	5	−1	4
4	Turkmenistan	4	1	3	3	7	−4	2
5	Philippines	4	0	4	1	8	−7	0

Source: AHF

Date	Time		Score		Period 1	Period 2	SO
15 Nov	11:00	Turkmenistan	0–2	Chinese Taipei	15–23	18–19	
15 Nov	17:00	Philippines	0–2	Jordan	8–15	12–15	
16 Nov	11:00	Chinese Taipei	2–0	Jordan	22–11	18–6	
16 Nov	17:00	Turkmenistan	0–2	Vietnam	7–16	8–13	
17 Nov	11:00	Vietnam	2–0	Philippines	17–8	24–3	
17 Nov	16:00	Jordan	2–1	Turkmenistan	9–10	14–13	6–4
18 Nov	11:00	Vietnam	2–0	Jordan	17–8	16–8	
18 Nov	17:00	Philippines	0–2	Chinese Taipei	8–11	6–24	
19 Nov	10:00	Philippines	1–2	Turkmenistan	15–10	5–10	9–11
19 Nov	16:00	Chinese Taipei	2–0	Vietnam	19–4	16–14	

===== Group B =====
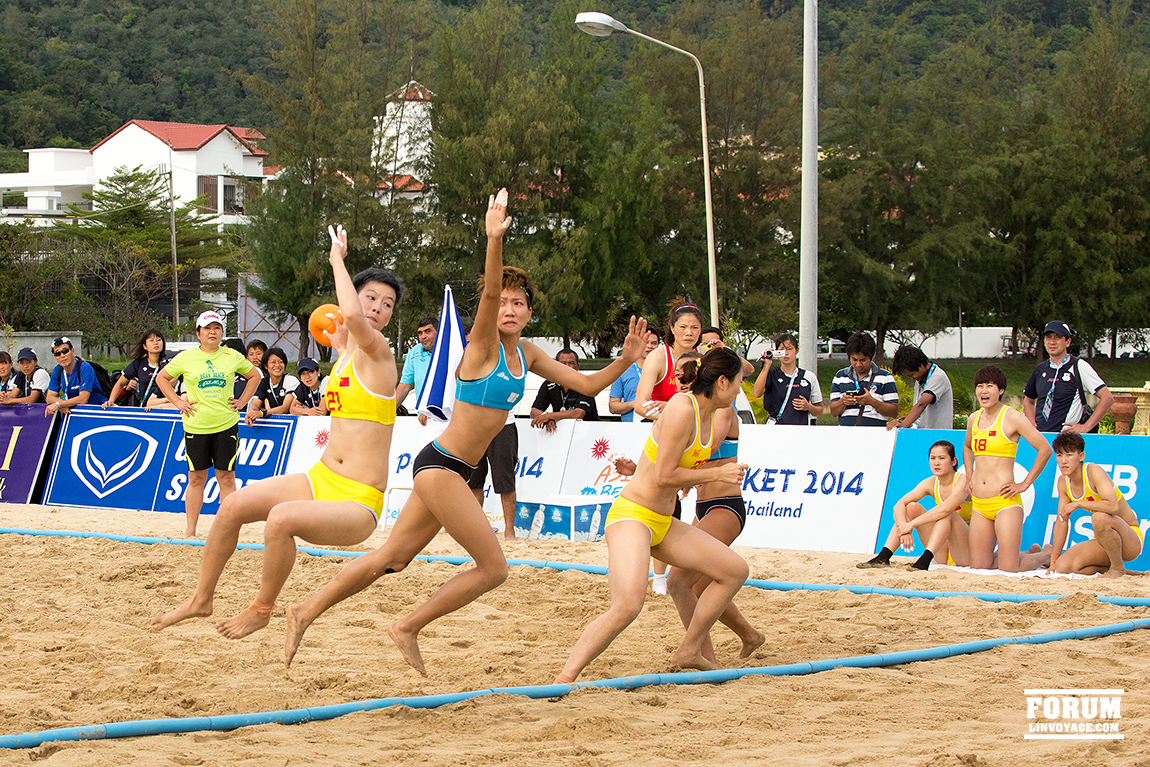
Hong Kong vs China

Pos	Team	Pld	W	L	SF	SA	SD	Pts
1	Thailand	4	4	0	8	1	+7	8
2	China	4	3	1	7	3	+4	6
3	Hong Kong	4	2	2	5	4	+1	4
4	Japan	4	1	3	2	6	−4	2
5	India	4	0	4	0	8	−8	0

Source: AHF

Date	Time		Score		Period 1	Period 2	SO
15 Nov	10:00	India	0–2	Japan	10–15	3–23	
15 Nov	16:00	Hong Kong	1–2	China	16–24	20–16	8–10
16 Nov	10:00	Japan	0–2	Hong Kong	8–13	8–10	
16 Nov	16:00	Thailand	2–1	China	14–12	20–22	7–1
17 Nov	10:00	China	2–0	India	25–9	18–10	
17 Nov	17:00	Hong Kong	0–2	Thailand	8–9	6–9	
18 Nov	10:00	Hong Kong	2–0	India	18–4	17–9	
18 Nov	16:00	Japan	0–2	Thailand	14–17	11–17	
19 Nov	11:00	India	0–2	Thailand	12–22	12–24	
19 Nov	17:00	Japan	0–2	China	12–15	5–18	

==== Placement 9th–10th ====
Date	Time		Score		Period 1	Period 2	SO
20 Nov	10:00	Philippines	2–0	India	18–10	14–9	

==== Placement 5th–8th ====
Semifinals
20 November
Jordan	1
Japan	2
20 November
Hong Kong	2
Turkmenistan	0

Placement 5th–6th
21 November
Japan	2
Hong Kong	1
Placement 7th–8th
21 November
Jordan	2
Turkmenistan	1

===== Semifinals =====
Date	Time		Score		Period 1	Period 2	SO
20 Nov	11:00	Jordan	1–2	Japan	11–13	15–13	6–9
20 Nov	15:00	Hong Kong	2–0	Turkmenistan	18–15	13–12	

===== Placement 7th–8th =====
Date	Time		Score		Period 1	Period 2	SO
21 Nov	16:00	Jordan	2–1	Turkmenistan	13–6	7–11	10–9

===== Placement 5th–6th =====
Date	Time		Score		Period 1	Period 2	SO
21 Nov	17:00	Japan	2–1	Hong Kong	14–20	9–8	7–4

==== Final round ====
Semifinals
20 November
Chinese Taipei	2
China	1
20 November
Thailand	2
Vietnam	0

Gold medal match
22 November
Chinese Taipei	0
Thailand	2
Bronze medal match
20 November
China	1
Vietnam	2

===== Semifinals =====
Date	Time		Score		Period 1	Period 2	SO
20 Nov	16:00	Chinese Taipei	2–1	China	15–22	21–20	9–6
20 Nov	16:45	Thailand	2–0	Vietnam	18–10	16–14	

===== Bronze medal match =====
Date	Time		Score		Period 1	Period 2	SO
22 Nov	15:00	China	1–2	Vietnam	15–12	13–15	10–12

===== Gold medal match =====
Date	Time		Score		Period 1	Period 2	SO
22 Nov	16:00	Chinese Taipei	0–2	Thailand	12–17	12–13	
