= Beach handball at the 2012 Asian Beach Games =

- Venue: Fengxiang Beach
- Dates: 16–22 June 2012

Beach handball at the 2012 Asian Beach Games was held from 16 June to 22 June 2012 in Zone A of Fengxiang Beach, Haiyang, China.

== Medalists ==
Event	Gold	Silver	Bronze
Men	Qatar; Hassan Mabrouk; Abdulrazzaq Murad; Mahmoud Osman; Ali Mohamed; Mohsin Yafai; Mohab Mahfouz; Mutasem Mohamed; Samir Hashim; Aymen Kharbech; Jassim Al-Buainain; Sid Kenaoui; Hamdi Missaoui; Ismail Mohammed	Bahrain; Mohamed Abdulhadi; Mahmood Ali; Fahad Jasim; Sayed Shehab Moosa; Abdulla Ali Salman; Bilal Basham; Raed Al-Marzooq; Jaafar Abbas; Husain Al-Qaidoom; Fawaz Shamsan; Husain Madan	Pakistan; Tahir Ali; Nasr Ullah; Tariq Iqbal; Muhammad Javed; Muhammad Shahid Pervaiz; Zahid Ali; Habib-ur-Rehman; Muhammad Sohaib; Muhammad Uzair Atif; Naseer Ahmed
Women	China; Liu Yun; Gong Yan; Shen Ping; Zhao Hui; Sun Laimiao; Huang Hong; Liu Xiaomei; Du Jijuan; Li Yao; Zhang Tianjie	Chinese Taipei; Chiu Yu-ting; Lin Wen-ya; Chen Ying-ju; Hsu Ju-fang; Yang Ya-ting; Chia Ling-hui; Chang Ya-wei; Chu Chiu-en	Vietnam; Tạ Mỹ Quyên; Phạm Thị Thanh Vân; Huỳnh Thị Kim Mỹ; Châu Ngọc Thùy Dung; Lê Thị Thanh Phụng; Hứa Thị Thu Nga; Võ Ngọc Hiếu; Nguyễn Thị Kim Thư; Nguyễn Thị Huyền Trang; Nguyễn Kim Oanh

== Medal table ==
Rank	Nation	Gold	Silver	Bronze	Total
1	China (CHN)	1	0	0	1
1	Qatar (QAT)	1	0	0	1
3	Bahrain (BRN)	0	1	0	1
3	Chinese Taipei (TPE)	0	1	0	1
5	Pakistan (PAK)	0	0	1	1
5	Vietnam (VIE)	0	0	1	1
Totals (6 entries)		2	2	2	6

== Results ==
=== Men ===
==== Preliminary round ====
===== Group A =====
Pos	Team	Pld	W	L	SF	SA	SD	Pts
1	Oman	3	3	0	6	0	+6	6
2	China	3	2	1	4	4	0	4
3	Japan	3	1	2	3	5	−2	2
4	Thailand	3	0	3	2	6	−4	0

Source: AHF

Date	Time		Score		Period 1	Period 2	SO
16 Jun	09:00	China	0–2	Oman	14–15	10–13	
17 Jun	09:00	Japan	1–2	China	14–16	18–15	4–5
17 Jun	14:00	Oman	2–0	Japan	32–18	25–24	
18 Jun	09:00	Thailand	0–2	Oman	15–17	13–15	
18 Jun	14:00	Japan	2–1	Thailand	17–22	18–17	9–8
19 Jun	10:00	Thailand	1–2	China	16–18	13–12	6–9

===== Group B =====
Pos	Team	Pld	W	L	SF	SA	SD	Pts
1	Qatar	4	4	0	8	0	+8	8
2	Pakistan	4	3	1	6	2	+4	6
3	Vietnam	4	2	2	4	5	−1	4
4	Hong Kong	4	1	3	2	6	−4	2
5	Sri Lanka	4	0	4	1	8	−7	0

Source: AHF

Date	Time		Score		Period 1	Period 2	SO
16 Jun	09:00	Sri Lanka	0–2	Pakistan	10–29	12–26	
16 Jun	11:00	Qatar	2–0	Vietnam	18–10	23–3	
17 Jun	10:00	Qatar	2–0	Sri Lanka	30–11	21–8	
17 Jun	10:00	Vietnam	2–0	Hong Kong	8–6	12–9	
17 Jun	15:00	Pakistan	2–0	Vietnam	22–8	21–18	
17 Jun	16:00	Hong Kong	0–2	Qatar	7–22	4–14	
18 Jun	09:00	Sri Lanka	1–2	Vietnam	17–21	16–15	6–9
18 Jun	15:00	Hong Kong	0–2	Pakistan	10–19	11–20	
19 Jun	10:00	Pakistan	0–2	Qatar	15–19	13–18	
19 Jun	11:00	Sri Lanka	0–2	Hong Kong	7–19	12–14	

===== Group C =====
Pos	Team	Pld	W	L	SF	SA	SD	Pts
1	Independent Olympic Athletes	4	4	0	8	1	+7	8
2	Bahrain	4	3	1	7	2	+5	6
3	India	4	2	2	4	4	0	4
4	Afghanistan	4	1	3	2	6	−4	2
5	Mongolia	4	0	4	0	8	−8	0

Source: AHF

Date	Time		Score		Period 1	Period 2	SO
16 Jun	10:00	Bahrain	2–0	Mongolia	21–5	24–7	
16 Jun	11:00	India	0–2	Independent Olympic Athletes	10–21	18–23	
17 Jun	09:00	Afghanistan	0–2	Bahrain	13–18	12–16	
17 Jun	10:00	Independent Olympic Athletes	2–0	Mongolia	16–4	23–9	
17 Jun	15:00	Bahrain	2–0	India	27–10	21–10	
17 Jun	16:00	Mongolia	0–2	Afghanistan	8–10	12–14	
18 Jun	09:00	Afghanistan	0–2	Independent Olympic Athletes	10–16	17–20	
18 Jun	10:00	India	2–0	Mongolia	19–12	21–10	
18 Jun	16:00	India	2–0	Afghanistan	18–16	14–13	
18 Jun	17:00	Independent Olympic Athletes	2–1	Bahrain	12–17	20–11	6–4

==== Match for 13/14 ====
Date	Time		Score		Period 1	Period 2	SO
20 Jun	09:00	Sri Lanka	2–1	Mongolia	14–17	14–8	7–6

==== 2nd round ====
===== Group D =====
Pos	Team	Pld	W	L	SF	SA	SD	Pts
1	Oman	2	2	0	4	1	+3	4
2	Pakistan	2	1	1	3	3	0	2
3	Independent Olympic Athletes	2	0	2	1	4	−3	0

Source: AHF

Date	Time		Score		Period 1	Period 2	SO
20 Jun	10:00	Independent Olympic Athletes	0–2	Oman	15–18	16–19	
20 Jun	14:00	Pakistan	2–1	Independent Olympic Athletes	20–12	13–16	8–6
20 Jun	16:00	Oman	2–1	Pakistan	11–12	22–21	10–8

===== Group E =====
Pos	Team	Pld	W	L	SF	SA	SD	Pts
1	Qatar	2	2	0	4	0	+4	4
2	Bahrain	2	1	1	2	2	0	2
3	China	2	0	2	0	4	−4	0

Source: AHF

Date	Time		Score		Period 1	Period 2	SO
20 Jun	10:00	Bahrain	2–0	China	20–11	19–14	
20 Jun	14:00	Qatar	2–0	Bahrain	16–14	13–12	
20 Jun	16:00	China	0–2	Qatar	4–26	15–21	

===== Group F =====
Pos	Team	Pld	W	L	SF	SA	SD	Pts
1	Japan	2	2	0	4	1	+3	4
2	India	2	1	1	3	2	+1	2
3	Hong Kong	2	0	2	0	4	−4	0

Source: AHF

Date	Time		Score		Period 1	Period 2	SO
20 Jun	09:00	India	1–2	Japan	20–23	23–22	2–5
20 Jun	11:00	Hong Kong	0–2	India	9–16	6–16	
20 Jun	15:00	Japan	2–0	Hong Kong	27–10	21–6	

===== Group G =====
Pos	Team	Pld	W	L	SF	SA	SD	Pts
1	Thailand	2	2	0	4	0	+4	4
2	Afghanistan	2	1	1	2	2	0	2
3	Vietnam	2	0	2	0	4	−4	0

Source: AHF

Date	Time		Score		Period 1	Period 2	SO
20 Jun	09:00	Afghanistan	0–2	Thailand	15–19	17–18	
20 Jun	11:00	Vietnam	0–2	Afghanistan	19–21	12–14	
20 Jun	15:00	Thailand	2–0	Vietnam	25–11	20–19	

==== Match for 11/12 ====
Date	Time		Score		Period 1	Period 2	SO
21 Jun	09:00	Hong Kong	2–0	Vietnam	18–14	10–6	

==== Classification 7–10 ====
Semifinals
21 June
Japan	2
Afghanistan	0
21 June
Thailand	2
India	0

Match for 7/8
21 June
Japan	2
Thailand	1
Match for 9/10
21 June
Afghanistan	0
India	2

===== Semifinals for 7–10 =====
Date	Time		Score		Period 1	Period 2	SO
21 Jun	09:00	Japan	2–0	Afghanistan	21–14	16–14	
21 Jun	09:00	Thailand	2–0	India	21–19	20–18	

===== Match for 9/10 =====
Date	Time		Score		Period 1	Period 2	SO
21 Jun	11:00	Afghanistan	0–2	India	13–16	13–15	

===== Match for 7/8 =====
Date	Time		Score		Period 1	Period 2	SO
21 Jun	11:00	Japan	2–1	Thailand	21–23	20–12	6–4

==== Match for 5/6 ====
Date	Time		Score		Period 1	Period 2	SO
21 Jun	10:00	Independent Olympic Athletes	2–1	China	12–11	12–13	10–8

==== Final round ====
Semifinals
21 June
Oman	1
Bahrain	2
21 June
Qatar	2
Pakistan	0

Gold medal match
22 June
Bahrain	0
Qatar	2
Bronze medal match
22 June
Oman	1
Pakistan	2

===== Semifinals =====
Date	Time		Score		Period 1	Period 2	SO
21 Jun	16:00	Oman	1–2	Bahrain	14–16	22–16	6–9
21 Jun	17:00	Qatar	2–0	Pakistan	20–13	12–11	

===== Bronze medal match =====
Date	Time		Score		Period 1	Period 2	SO
22 Jun	11:00	Oman	1–2	Pakistan	16–13	9–12	14–16

===== Gold medal match =====
Date	Time		Score		Period 1	Period 2	SO
22 Jun	12:00	Bahrain	0–2	Qatar	12–14	18–24	

=== Women ===
==== Preliminary round ====
===== Group A =====
Pos	Team	Pld	W	L	SF	SA	SD	Pts
1	Chinese Taipei	4	3	1	7	2	+5	6
2	Vietnam	4	3	1	6	3	+3	6
3	Turkmenistan	4	2	2	4	4	0	4
4	Japan	4	2	2	5	5	0	4
5	India	4	0	4	0	8	−8	0

Source: AHF

Date	Time		Score		Period 1	Period 2	SO
16 Jun	09:00	Japan	2–1	Chinese Taipei	9–7	4–8	4–0
16 Jun	10:00	Turkmenistan	0–2	Vietnam	10–13	13–16	
17 Jun	11:00	Chinese Taipei	2–0	India	17–12	20–9	
17 Jun	17:00	Japan	0–2	Turkmenistan	16–17	6–7	
17 Jun	17:00	Vietnam	0–2	Chinese Taipei	10–16	10–11	
18 Jun	11:00	India	0–2	Vietnam	6–15	9–21	
18 Jun	16:00	Turkmenistan	0–2	Chinese Taipei	9–11	6–20	
18 Jun	17:00	India	0–2	Japan	4–14	11–13	
19 Jun	09:00	Vietnam	2–1	Japan	8–11	16–13	9–7
19 Jun	10:00	Turkmenistan	2–0	India	13–12	13–10	

===== Group B =====
Pos	Team	Pld	W	L	SF	SA	SD	Pts
1	China	4	4	0	8	0	+8	8
2	Thailand	4	3	1	6	2	+4	6
3	Jordan	4	2	2	4	4	0	4
4	Hong Kong	4	1	3	2	6	−4	2
5	Philippines	4	0	4	0	8	−8	0

Source: AHF

Date	Time		Score		Period 1	Period 2	SO
16 Jun	10:00	Jordan	2–0	Philippines	17–2	21–9	
17 Jun	09:00	China	2–0	Thailand	15–14	15–8	
17 Jun	15:00	Thailand	2–0	Philippines	18–6	17–3	
17 Jun	16:00	Hong Kong	0–2	Jordan	9–10	7–11	
18 Jun	10:00	Jordan	0–2	China	5–17	6–21	
18 Jun	11:00	Philippines	0–2	Hong Kong	6–11	7–14	
18 Jun	15:00	Hong Kong	0–2	Thailand	13–20	8–20	
18 Jun	16:00	China	2–0	Philippines	22–5	26–6	
19 Jun	09:00	China	2–0	Hong Kong	19–6	20–11	
19 Jun	09:00	Thailand	2–0	Jordan	21–6	19–18	

==== Match for 9/10 ====
Date	Time		Score		Period 1	Period 2	SO
20 Jun	10:00	India	2–0	Philippines	28–11	12–11	

==== Classification 5–8 ====
Semifinals
20 June
Turkmenistan	2
Hong Kong	0
20 June
Jordan	1
Japan	2

Match for 5/6
21 June
Turkmenistan	1
Japan	2
Match for 7/8
21 June
Hong Kong	2
Jordan	1

===== Semifinals for 5–8 =====
Date	Time		Score		Period 1	Period 2	SO
20 Jun	14:00	Turkmenistan	2–0	Hong Kong	17–10	10–8	
20 Jun	15:00	Jordan	1–2	Japan	11–12	16–14	8–10

===== Match for 7/8 =====
Date	Time		Score		Period 1	Period 2	SO
21 Jun	10:00	Hong Kong	2–1	Jordan	10–11	16–12	4–1

===== Match for 5/6 =====
Date	Time		Score		Period 1	Period 2	SO
21 Jun	10:00	Turkmenistan	1–2	Japan	11–9	10–12	6–8

==== Final round ====
Semifinals
21 June
Chinese Taipei	2
Thailand	1
21 June
China	2
Vietnam	0

Gold medal match
22 June
Chinese Taipei	0
China	2
Bronze medal match
22 June
Thailand	1
Vietnam	2

===== Semifinals =====
Date	Time		Score		Period 1	Period 2	SO
21 Jun	14:00	Chinese Taipei	2–1	Thailand	20–14	18–19	8–6
21 Jun	15:00	China	2–0	Vietnam	15–8	16–9	

===== Bronze medal match =====
Date	Time		Score		Period 1	Period 2	SO
22 Jun	09:00	Thailand	1–2	Vietnam	11–12	13–12	4–7

===== Gold medal match =====
Date	Time		Score		Period 1	Period 2	SO
22 Jun	10:00	Chinese Taipei	0–2	China	11–18	12–19	
