= 2012 in handball =

The following are the handball events of the year 2012 throughout the world. Tournaments include international, professional (club), youth and amateur levels.

== National Teams ==
=== International Tournaments ===
- 2012 Summer Olympics:
  - Men: (gold) France (silver) Sweden (bronze) Croatia
  - Women: (gold) Norway (silver) Montenegro (bronze) Spain

=== Continental Tournaments ===
- African Championships:
  - Men: (gold) Tunisia (silver) Algeria (bronze) Egypt
  - Women: (gold) Angola (silver) Tunisia (bronze) DR Congo
- Asian Championships:
  - Men: (gold) South Korea (silver) Qatar (bronze) Saudi Arabia
  - Women: (gold) South Korea (silver) China (bronze) Japan
- European Championships:
  - Men: (gold) Denmark (silver) Serbia (bronze) Croatia
  - Women: (gold) Montenegro (silver) Norway (bronze) Hungary
- Oceania Championships:
  - Men: (gold) Australia (silver) New Zealand
- Pan American Championships:
  - Men: (gold) Argentina (silver) Brazil (bronze) Chile

=== Youth Tournaments ===
- Women's Youth World Championship: (gold) Denmark (silver) Russia (bronze) Norway
- Women's Junior World Championship: (gold) Sweden (silver) France (bronze) Hungary
- Americas
  - Pan American Women's Youth Championship: (gold) Brazil (silver) Uruguay (bronze) Paraguay
  - Pan American Women's Junior Championship: (gold) Brazil (silver) Uruguay (bronze) Argentina
- Asia
  - Asian Men's Junior Championship: (gold) Qatar (silver) South Korea (bronze) Kuwait

== Club Teams ==
=== International Tournaments ===
- IHF Super Globe: (gold) (Spain) Atlético Madrid (silver) (Germany) THW Kiel (bronze) (Qatar) Al Sadd

=== Continental Tournaments ===
- Africa
  - Men
    - African Handball Cup Winners' Cup: (gold) (Tunisia) ES Sahel H.C (silver) (Egypt) Zamalek SC (bronze) (Tunisia) Club Africain HB
    - African Handball Super Cup: (gold) (Egypt) Zamalek S.C (silver) (Cameroon) FAP Yaoundé
- Europe
  - Men
    - EHF Champions League: (gold) (Germany) THW Kiel (silver) (Spain) Atlético Madrid (bronze) (Denmark) AG København
    - EHF Cup: (gold) (Germany) Frisch Auf Göppingen (silver) (France) Dunkerque HB Grand Littoral (bronze) (Germany) Rhein-Neckar Löwen/ (Germany) SC Magdeburg
    - EHF Challenge Cup: (gold) (Greece) AC Diomidis Argous (silver) (Switzerland) Wacker Thun (bronze) (Israel) Maccabi Tel Aviv/ (Portugal) Sporting CP
  - Women
    - EHF Champions League: (gold) (Montenegro) Budućnost Podgorica (silver) (Hungary) Győri Audi ETO KC (bronze) (Romania) CS Oltchim Rm. Vâlcea/ (Norway) Larvik HK
    - EHF Cup Winners' Cup: (gold) (Hungary) FTC-Rail Cargo Hungaria (silver) (Norway) Viborg HK (bronze) (Russia) HC Dinamo Volgograd/ (Germany) HC Leipzig
    - EHF Cup: (gold) (Russia) Lada Togliatti (silver) (Romania) Zalău (bronze) (Denmark) Vejen/ (Spain) Mar Alicante
    - EHF Challenge Cup: (gold) (France) Le Havre (silver) (Turkey) Muratpasa (bronze) (France) Fleury/ (Croatia) Lokomotiva Zagreb

== Beach Handball ==
- Beach Handball World Championships
  - Men: (gold) Brazil (silver) Ukraine (bronze) Croatia
  - Women: (gold) Brazil (silver) Denmark (bronze) Norway
- Asian Beach Games
  - Men: (gold) Qatar (silver) Bahrain (bronze) Pakistan
  - Women: (gold) China (silver) Chinese Taipei (bronze) Vietnam
