= China men's national beach handball team =

China

Information
- Association: Chinese Handball Association
- Coach: Zhu Wenxin

Colours
Home	Away

Results

World Championship
- Appearances: 1 (First in 2024)
- Best result: 12th (2024)
- Last updated on Unknown.

The China national beach handball team is the national team of China. It is governed by the Chinese Handball Association and takes part in international beach handball competitions.

== World Championship results ==
Year	Position
(Egypt) 2004	Did not qualify
(Brazil) 2006	Did not qualify
(Spain) 2008	Did not qualify
(Turkey) 2010	Did not qualify
(Oman) 2012	Did not qualify
(Brazil) 2014	Did not qualify
(Hungary) 2016	Did not qualify
(Russia) 2018	Did not qualify
(Italy) 2020	Cancelled
(Greece) 2022	Did not qualify
(China) 2024	12th place
Total	1/10
