= Pakistan men's national beach handball team =

Pakistan

Information
- Association: Pakistan Handball Federation
- Coach: Naseer Ahmad (Pakistan)
- Captain: Tahir Ali

Colours
Home	Away

Results

World Championship
- Appearances: 1 (First in 2008)
- Best result: 10th (2008)

Asian Beach Handball Championship
- Appearances: 5 (First in 2004)
- Best result: 1st 2007
- Last updated on 2 February 2020.

Pakistan men's national beach handball team
Medal record

Men's beach handball

Representing Pakistan

Asian Championship
Bronze medal – third place	2004 Oman	
Gold medal – first place	2007 Iran	

Asian Beach Games
Gold medal – first place	2008 Indonesia	Team
Silver medal – second place	2010 Oman	Team
Bronze medal – third place	2012 China	Team
Bronze medal – third place	2014 Thailand	Team
Bronze medal – third place	2016 Vietnam	Team

The Pakistan national beach handball team (Urdu: پاکستان قومى ساحل ہینڈبال ٹیم) is the men's beach handball team that has represented Pakistan in international competitions. It is governed by the Pakistan Handball Federation.

== History ==
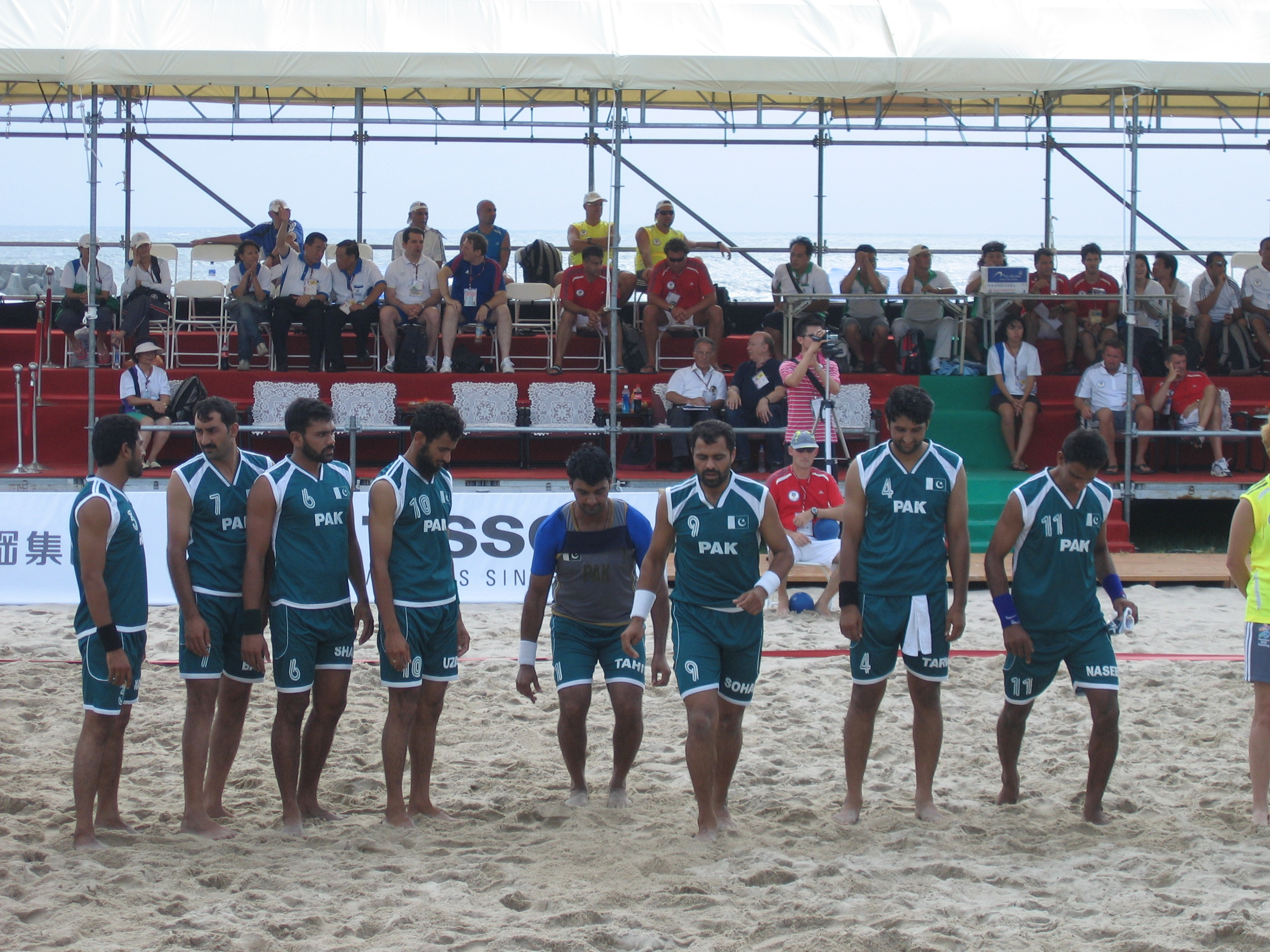
Pakistan Beach Handball team at the 2009 World Games in Taiwan

Pakistan has one of the most successful national beach handball teams from South Asia in international competitions, having won the Asian Championship in 2007 and Asian Beach Games in 2008.

Pakistan national team made their debut in IHF World Championship at the 2008 edition, finishing at 10th position.

Pakistan have won a total of 8 official international medals to professional and grassroots level selections, with one gold and silver medal along with three bronze medals in the Asian Beach Games beach handball tournaments held in Bali 2008, Muscat 2010, Haiyang 2012, Phuket 2014 and Danang 2016, respectively.

Iqbal Stadium in Faisalabad is team's home ground, although most of their home games are frequently played in other venues across the country.

== World Championship results ==
Year	Position
(Egypt) 2004	Did not Qualify
(Brazil) 2006	Did not Qualify
(Spain) 2008	10th place
(Turkey) 2010	Did not Qualify
(Oman) 2012	Did not Qualify
(Brazil) 2014	Did not Qualify
(Hungary) 2016	Did not Qualify
(Russia) 2018	Did not Qualify
(Italy) 2020	Did not Qualify
Total	1/9

== Asian Championship results ==
Year	Position
(Oman) 2004	3rd place
(Iran) 2007	1st place
(Oman) 2011	4th place
(Hong Kong) 2013	Did not Enter
(Oman) 2015	4th place
(Thailand) 2017	Did not Enter
(China) 2019	6th place
(Iran) 2022	Did not Enter
(Indonesia) 2023	Did not Enter
(Oman) 2025	3rd place
Total	6/10
