= Vietnam men's national beach handball team =

Vietnam

Information
- Association: Vietnam Handball Federation
- Coach: Cường Trịnh Huy

Colours
Home	Away

Results

World Games
- Appearances: none

World Championship
- Appearances: 2 (First in 2018)
- Best result: 14th (2018)
- Last updated on 10 October 2019.

Vietnam men's national beach handball team
Medal record

Representing Vietnam

Southeast Asian Championship
Gold medal – first place	2017 Philippines	

Southeast Asian Games
Gold medal – first place	2019 Philippines	
Gold medal – first place	2021 Vietnam	

Vietnam men's national beach handball team (Vietnamese: Đội tuyển bóng ném bãi biển nam quốc gia Việt Nam) is a national team of Vietnam. It takes part in international beach handball competitions and friendly matches.

== Competitions results ==
=== World Games ===
- (Japan) 2001 — Did not enter
- (Germany) 2005 — Did not enter
- (Chinese Taipei) 2009 — Did not enter
- (Colombia) 2013 — Did not enter
- (Poland) 2017 — Did not qualify

=== World Championship ===
Year	Position
(Egypt) 2004	Did not Enter
(Brazil) 2006	Did not Enter
(Spain) 2008	Did not Enter
(Turkey) 2010	Did not Enter
(Oman) 2012	Did not Enter
(Brazil) 2014	Did not Qualify
(Hungary) 2016	Did not Qualify
(Russia) 2018	14th place
(Italy) 2020	Cancelled
(Greece) 2022	Did not Qualify
Total	1/10

=== Asian Championship ===
- (Oman) 2004 — Did not enter
- (Iran) 2007 — Did not enter
- (Oman) 2011 — Did not enter
- (Hong Kong) 2013 — 5th Place
- (Oman) 2015 — 6th Place
- (Thailand) 2017 — 4th Place
- (China) 2019 — 4th Place
- (Iran) 2022 — Bronze medal
- (Indonesia) 2023 — 4th Place
- (Oman) 2025 — Did not enter

=== Asian Beach Games ===
- (Indonesia) 2008 — Did not enter
- (Oman) 2010 — Did not enter
- (China) 2012 — 12th Place
- (Thailand) 2014 — 8th Place
- (Vietnam) 2016 — 4th Place
- (China) 2023 — TBD

=== Southeast Asian Games ===
- (Philippines) 2019 — Gold medal
- (Vietnam) 2021 — Gold medal

=== Southeast Asian Championship ===
- (Philippines) 2017 — Gold medal
- (Thailand) 2020 — Cancelled
