= Oman Handball Association =

Sports governing body in Oman

Oman Handball Association Arabic: الإتحاد العماني لكرة اليد OHA
- IOC nation: Sultanate of Oman (OMA)
- Sport: Handball
- Other sports: Beach Handball

AFFILIATIONS
- International federation: International Handball Federation (IHF)
- IHF member since: 1982
- Continental association: Asian Handball Federation
- National Olympic Committee: Oman Olympic Committee

GOVERNING BODY
- President: Said Ahmad Al-Shahri (Oman)

HEADQUARTERS
- Address: Ruwi, Muscat
- Country: Oman
- Secretary General: Mossa Khamis Al-Bulushi (Oman)

The Oman Handball Association (Arabic: الإتحاد العماني لكرة اليد) (OHA) is the administrative and controlling body for handball and beach handball in Sultanate of Oman. OHA is a member of the Asian Handball Federation (AHF) and member of the International Handball Federation (IHF) since 1982.

== National teams ==
- Oman men's national handball team
- Oman men's national junior handball team
- Oman men's national beach handball team
- Oman women's national handball team

== Competitions hosted ==
=== International ===
- 2012 Beach Handball World Championships

=== Continental ===
- 2026 Asian Men's Handball Championship
- 2025 Asian Men's Club League Handball Championship
- 2018 Asian Men's Junior Handball Championship
- 2015 Asian Beach Handball Championship
- 2011 Asian Beach Handball Championship
- 2010 Asian Beach Games
- 2006 Asian Men's Club League Handball Championship
- 2004 Asian Beach Handball Championship
