= Kuwait men's national beach handball team =

Kuwait

Information
- Association: Kuwait Handball Association

Colours
Home	Away

Results

World Championship
- Appearances: 1 (First in 2012)
- Best result: 10th (2012)
- Last updated on Unknown.

The Kuwait national beach handball team is the national team of Kuwait. It is governed by the Kuwait Handball Association and takes part in international beach handball competitions.

In 2015, the Kuwait Handball Association was suspended from the International Handball Federation and banned from "sporting contact" with IHF member federations.

== World Championship results ==
Year	Position
(Egypt) 2004	Did not Qualify
(Brazil) 2006	Did not Qualify
(Spain) 2008	Did not Qualify
(Turkey) 2010	Did not Qualify
(Oman) 2012	10th place
(Brazil) 2014	Did not Qualify
(Hungary) 2016	Did not Qualify
(Russia) 2018	Did not Qualify
(Italy) 2020	Did not Qualify
Total	1/9
