= IHF Beach Handball World Championships =

International beach handball competition

IHF Men's & Women's Beach Handball World Championships
- Current season, competition or edition: 2026 Men's Beach Handball World Championships; 2026 Women's Beach Handball World Championships
- Sport: Beach Handball
- Founded: 2004
- Founder: International Handball Federation
- First season: 2004
- No. of teams: 16
- Continents: 5
- Most recent champions: Germany (men); Argentina (women)
- Most titles: Brazil (men; 5 titles); Brazil (women; 3 titles)

The IHF Beach Handball World Championships is an international beach handball competition contested by the men's and women's national teams of the member federations/associations of International Handball Federation (IHF), the sport's global governing body.

The tournament was established in 2004, taking place every two years to allow continental tournaments to flourish without the burden of the World Championship qualifiers crowding the schedule every 12 months. The current tournament format lasts over approximately 6 days and involves 16 teams initially competing in four groups of four teams. The group winners and runners-up advance to a series of knock-out stages until the champion is crowned. The losing semi-finalists play each other in a play-off match to determine the third and fourth-placed teams.

Brazil is the most successful national team in the competition, having claimed 5 men's and 3 women's world titles. The most recent edition took place in 2024 in China where the Croatian men's national team in the final defeated Denmark, while in the women's competition, Germany defeated Argentina in the final, both teams defending the title from Greece in 2022.

== Men's tournament ==
=== Summary ===
Year	Host	Final			Bronze match		
Year	Host	Gold	Score	Silver	Bronze	Score	Fourth place
2004; Details	El Gouna	Egypt	2–1	Turkey	Russia	2–1	Croatia
2006; Details	Rio de Janeiro	Brazil	2–0	Turkey	Spain	2–1	Egypt
2008; Details	Cádiz	Croatia	2–1 (p.s.)	Brazil	Serbia	2–0	Egypt
2010; Details	Antalya	Brazil	2–0	Hungary	Turkey	2–1	Egypt
2012; Details	Muscat	Brazil	2–1	Ukraine	Croatia	2–0	Russia
2014; Details	Recife	Brazil	2–1	Croatia	Qatar	2–1	Denmark
2016; Details	Budapest	Croatia	2–0	Brazil	Qatar	2–1	Hungary
2018; Details	Kazan	Brazil	2–0	Croatia	Hungary	2–0	Sweden
2020; Details	Pescara	Cancelled due to the COVID-19 pandemic			Cancelled due to the COVID-19 pandemic		
2022; Details	Crete	Croatia	2–0	Denmark	Brazil	2–0	Greece
2024; Details	Pingtan Island	Croatia	2–1	Denmark	Portugal	2–0	Germany
2026; Details	Zagreb	Germany	2–0	Brazil	Argentina	2–1	Croatia
2028; Details	Salalah						

=== Medal table ===
Rank	Nation	Gold	Silver	Bronze	Total
1	Brazil	5	3	1	9
2	Croatia	4	2	1	7
3	Egypt	1	0	0	1
3	Germany	1	0	0	1
5	Turkey	0	2	1	3
6	Denmark	0	2	0	2
7	Hungary	0	1	1	2
8	Ukraine	0	1	0	1
9	Qatar	0	0	2	2
10	Argentina	0	0	1	1
10	Portugal	0	0	1	1
10	Russia	0	0	1	1
10	Serbia	0	0	1	1
10	Spain	0	0	1	1
Totals (14 entries)		11	11	11	33

=== Participating nations ===
Nation	(Egypt) 2004	(Brazil) 2006	(Spain) 2008	(Turkey) 2010	(Oman) 2012	(Brazil) 2014	(Hungary) 2016	(Russia) 2018	~~2020~~	(Greece) 2022	(China) 2024	(Croatia) 2026	(Oman) 2028	Years
Argentina						10th		11th		11th	8th	3rd		5
Australia				12th	12th	11th	12th	13th			14th	15th		7
Bahrain	7th	6th			9th		9th							4
Brazil	9th	1st	2nd	1st	1st	1st	2nd	1st		3rd	6th	2nd		11
China											12th			1
Croatia	4th	7th	1st	7th	3rd	2nd	1st	2nd		1st	1st	4th		11
Denmark				5th		4th		7th		2nd	2nd	7th		6
Dominican Republic		10th												1
Ecuador										13th				1
Egypt	1st	4th	4th	4th	6th	8th	8th			15th				8
France												10th		1
Germany		8th									4th	1st	Q	4
Greece										4th				1
Hungary	6th	5th	7th	2nd			4th	3rd			7th	8th		8
Iran			11th					8th		9th		9th		4
Italy												11th		1
Kuwait					10th									1
Libya			12th	11th										2
Norway										8th				1
New Zealand								16th		14th				2
Oman	8th			9th	8th	12th	7th	10th			15th	14th	Q	9
Pakistan			10th											1
Portugal										10th	3rd	6th		3
Puerto Rico										16th	16th	16th		3
Qatar				10th	7th	3rd	3rd	9th		5th	10th			7
Russia	3rd	9th	8th	6th	4th	7th		6th		DQ				7
Serbia			3rd			6th								2
Spain		3rd	5th	8th	5th	5th	5th	5th		7th	5th	5th		10
Sweden								4th						1
Tunisia											11th	12th		2
Turkey	2nd	2nd	6th	3rd										4
United States							11th	12th		12th	13th	13th		5
Ukraine	5th				2nd		6th							3
Uruguay			9th		11th	9th	10th	15th		6th	9th			7
Vietnam								14th						1
Total	9	10	12	12	12	12	12	16		16	16	16	16	

== Women's tournament ==
=== Summary ===
Year	Host	Final			Bronze match		
Year	Host	Gold	Score	Silver	Bronze	Score	Fourth place
2004; Details	El Gouna	Russia	2–1	Turkey	Italy	^{n/a}	Croatia
2006; Details	Rio de Janeiro	Brazil	2–0	Germany	Russia	2–0	Bulgaria
2008; Details	Cádiz	Croatia	2–0	Spain	Brazil	2–1	Italy
2010; Details	Antalya	Norway	2–0	Denmark	Brazil	2–0	Ukraine
2012; Details	Muscat	Brazil	2–0	Denmark	Norway	2–0	Hungary
2014; Details	Recife	Brazil	2–0	Hungary	Norway	2–1	Ukraine
2016; Details	Budapest	Spain	2–1	Brazil	Norway	2–1	Hungary
2018; Details	Kazan	Greece	2–1	Norway	Brazil	2–0	Spain
2020; Details	Pescara	Cancelled due to the COVID-19 pandemic			Cancelled due to the COVID-19 pandemic		
2022; Details	Crete	Germany	2–0	Spain	Netherlands	2–1	Greece
2024; Details	Pingtan Island	Germany	2–0	Argentina	Netherlands	2–0	Denmark
2026; Details	Zagreb	Argentina	2–1	Denmark	Spain	2–0	Brazil
2028; Details	Salalah						

=== Medal table ===
Rank	Nation	Gold	Silver	Bronze	Total
1	Brazil	3	1	3	7
2	Germany	2	1	0	3
3	Spain	1	2	1	4
4	Norway	1	1	3	5
5	Argentina	1	1	0	2
6	Russia	1	0	1	2
7	Croatia	1	0	0	1
7	Greece	1	0	0	1
9	Denmark	0	3	0	3
10	Hungary	0	1	0	1
10	Turkey	0	1	0	1
12	Netherlands	0	0	2	2
13	Italy	0	0	1	1
Totals (13 entries)		11	11	11	33

=== Participating nations ===
Nation	(Egypt) 2004	(Brazil) 2006	(Spain) 2008	(Turkey) 2010	(Oman) 2012	(Brazil) 2014	(Hungary) 2016	(Russia) 2018	~~2020~~	(Greece) 2022	(China) 2024	(Croatia) 2026	(Oman) 2028	Years
Argentina						11th	7th			7th	2nd	1st	Q	6
Australia					8th	12th	8th	16th		16th	13th	WD		7
Benin												WD		0
Brazil	6th	1st	3rd	3rd	1st	1st	2nd	3rd		6th	8th	4th		11
Bulgaria		4th												1
China			12th	11th	9th						14th			4
Chinese Taipei						10th	6th	13th						3
Cook Islands												15th		1
Croatia	4th	6th	1st	6th	5th						7th	8th		7
Denmark				2nd	2nd	7th		5th		5th	4th	2nd		7
Dominican Republic		10th	11th											2
France								11th						1
Germany		2nd								1st	1st	5th		4
Greece								1st		4th	10th	6th		4
Hong Kong	8th													1
Hungary	5th	7th		7th	4th	2nd	4th			9th				7
Italy	3rd	8th	4th	8th	7th	6th	5th							7
Japan	7th			10th										2
North Macedonia			10th											1
Mexico								12th		15th				2
Netherlands										3rd	3rd	7th		3
New Zealand				12th										1
Norway			6th	1st	3rd	3rd	3rd	2nd		11th	11th	9th		9
Oman													Q	1
Paraguay								8th						1
Philippines											12th	12th		2
Poland					10th		10th	6th						3
Portugal										8th	6th			2
Puerto Rico											15th	13th		2
Russia	1st	3rd	5th					7th						4
Serbia			8th											1
Singapore					12th									1
Spain			2nd	9th		5th	1st	4th		2nd	5th	3rd		8
Thailand					11th	9th	9th	15th		10th				5
Tunisia							12th							2
Turkey	2nd	5th		5th										3
Ukraine			9th	4th		4th								3
United States								14th		14th	16th	14th		4
Uruguay		9th	7th		6th	8th	11th	10th		12th		10th		8
Vietnam								9th		13th	9th	11th		4
Total	8	10	12	12	12	12	12	16		16	16	16	16	

== Overall medal count ==
Rank	Nation	Gold	Silver	Bronze	Total
1	Brazil	8	4	4	16
2	Croatia	5	2	1	8
3	Germany	3	1	0	4
4	Spain	1	2	2	5
5	Norway	1	1	3	5
6	Argentina	1	1	1	3
7	Russia	1	0	2	3
8	Egypt	1	0	0	1
8	Greece	1	0	0	1
10	Denmark	0	5	0	5
11	Turkey	0	3	1	4
12	Hungary	0	2	1	3
13	Ukraine	0	1	0	1
14	Netherlands	0	0	2	2
14	Qatar	0	0	2	2
16	Italy	0	0	1	1
16	Portugal	0	0	1	1
16	Serbia	0	0	1	1
Totals (18 entries)		22	22	22	66

== See also ==
- Beach handball at the World Games
- Asian Beach Handball Championship
- European Beach Handball Championship (disambiguation)
- Oceania Beach Handball Championship
- Pan American Beach Handball Championship
- South and Central American Beach Handball Championship
- IHF Youth Beach Handball World Championship
