= North Macedonia women's national beach handball team =

North Macedonia

Information
- Association: Macedonian Handball Federation

Colours
Home	Away

Results

World Championship
- Appearances: 1 (First in 2008)
- Best result: 10th (2008)
- Last updated on Unknown.

The North Macedonia women's national beach handball team is the national team of North Macedonia. It takes part in international beach handball competitions.

== World Championship ==
- 2008 – 10th place

== European Championship ==
- 2011 -10th place
- 2023 -TBD
