= Poland women's national beach handball team =

Poland

Information
- Association: Poland Handball Federation
- Coach: Marek Karpiński

Colours
Home	Away

Results

World Championship
- Appearances: 3 (First in 2012)
- Best result: 6th (2018)
- Last updated on Unknown.

The Poland women's national beach handball team is the national team of Poland. It is governed by the Poland Handball Federation and takes part in international beach handball competitions.

== World Championships results ==
- 2012 – 10th place
- 2016 – 10th place
- 2018 – 6th place
