= Beach handball at the 2021 SEA Games – Men's tournament =

Beach handball at the 2021 SEA Games
- Dates: 6–11 May 2022
- Nations: 4

Beach handball men's tournament at the 2021 Southeast Asian Games is scheduled to be held from 6 to 11 May 2022 in Hạ Long, Quảng Ninh, Vietnam. There are four participating teams. A double round robin format was adopted.

== Results ==
Pos	Team	Pld	W	L	SF	SA	SD	Pts
1	Vietnam	6	6	0	12	3	+9	12
2	Philippines	6	4	2	9	5	+4	8
3	Thailand	6	2	4	7	8	−1	4
4	Singapore	6	0	6	0	12	−12	0

Source: 2021 SEA Games
- All times at local

Date	Time	First team	Score	Second team	Set 1	Set 2	Set 3
6 May	16:00	Philippines	2–0	Thailand	18–16	18–16	
6 May	17:00	Vietnam	2–0	Singapore	18–8	17–7	
7 May	16:00	Singapore	0–2	Thailand	10–24	10–15	
7 May	17:00	Philippines	0–2	Vietnam	14–24	12–23	
8 May	16:00	Philippines	2–0	Singapore	22–16	22–19	
8 May	17:00	Vietnam	2–1	Thailand	22–12	16–20	17–16
9 May	16:00	Thailand	1–2	Philippines	21–26	27–22	6–7
9 May	17:00	Singapore	0–2	Vietnam	8–20	14–17	
10 May	16:00	Thailand	2–0	Singapore	26–18	21–18	
10 May	17:00	Vietnam	2–1	Philippines	14–18	21–14	10–8
11 May	16:00	Singapore	0–2	Philippines	11–20	14–16	
11 May	17:00	Thailand	1–2	Vietnam	18–12	20–21	6–9

== See also ==
- Handball at the 2021 Southeast Asian Games
