= Singapore women's national beach handball team =

Singapore

Information
- Association: Handball Federation Singapore

Colours
Home	Away

Results

World Championship
- Appearances: 1 (First in 2012)
- Best result: 12th (2012)
- Last updated on Unknown.

The Singapore women's national beach handball team is the national team of Singapore. It is governed by the Handball Federation Singapore and takes part in international beach handball competitions.

== World Championships results ==
- 2012 – 12th place
