= Beach handball at the 2019 SEA Games =

- Dates: 7–11 December
- Nations: 5

Beach handball at the 2019 Southeast Asian Games was held at the Subic Tennis Court at the Subic Bay Freeport Zone between 7 and 11 December 2019.

It is the last medal event and only medal event in the final day of the games.

== Medalists ==
Event	Gold	Silver	Bronze
Men	Vietnam; Hoàng Văn Tiến; Huỳnh Tấn Vỹ; Huỳnh Nam Tiến; Kim Xuân Tiến; La Văn Lớn; Lê Văn Bình; Nguyễn Chí Tâm; Nguyễn Quang Tú; Văn Quang Tùng; Võ Vương Trọng	Thailand; Open Kannarong; Bulakorn Kongka; Nutdanai Ruksawong; Kittipong Ruksawong; Chokchai Saitaphap; Chaiwat Sinsuwan; Puwanart Srichai; Passakorn Srinamkham; Chainarong Srisong; Surasak Waenwiset	Philippines; Van Jacob Baccay; Mark Dubouzet; Andrew Michael Harris; Manuel Lasangue Jr. Jamael Pangandaman; John Michael Pasco; Rey Joshua Tabuzo; Josef Valdez; Dhane Varela; Daryoush Zandi

== Results ==
Pos	Team	Pld	W	L	SF	SA	SD	Pts
1	Vietnam	4	4	0	8	1	+7	8
2	Thailand	4	3	1	7	2	+5	6
3	Philippines	4	2	2	4	5	−1	4
4	Indonesia	4	1	3	3	6	−3	2
5	Singapore	4	0	4	0	8	−8	0

Source: 2019 SEA Games

Date		Score		Set 1	Set 2	Set 3
7 Dec	Philippines	2–0; Report	Singapore	22–6	18–11	
7 Dec	Thailand	2–0; Report	Indonesia	18–12	12–10	
8 Dec	Singapore	0–2; Report	Vietnam	11–24	12–29	
8 Dec	Indonesia	1–2; Report	Philippines	12–13	20–18	6–7
9 Dec	Indonesia	2–0; Report	Singapore	18–10	22–14	
9 Dec	Thailand	1–2; Report	Vietnam	14–13	15–17	12–13
10 Dec	Philippines	0–2; Report	Vietnam	18–20	10–23	
10 Dec	Thailand	2–0; Report	Singapore	18–10	20–10	
11 Dec	Vietnam	2–0; Report	Indonesia	19–16	20–10	
11 Dec	Thailand	2–0; Report	Philippines	19–18	21–16	
