= Russia women's national beach handball team =

Russia

Information
- Association: Handball Federation of Russia
- Coach: Vitaly Volnychenko

Colours
Home	Away

Results

World Championship
- Appearances: 4 (First in 2018)
- Best result: (gold) 1st (2004)
- Last updated on Unknown.

Russia women's national beach handball team
Medal record

World Championship
Gold medal – first place	2004 Egypt	
Bronze medal – third place	2006 Brazil	

The Russia women's national beach handball team is the national team of Russia. It is governed by the Handball Union of Russia and takes part in international beach handball competitions.

In reaction to the 2022 Russian invasion of Ukraine, the International Handball Federation banned Russian and Belarus athletes and officials, and the European Handball Federation suspended the national teams of Russia and Belarus as well as Russian and Belarusian clubs competing in European handball competitions. Referees, officials, and commission members from Russia and Belarus will not be called upon for future activities. And new organisers will be sought for the YAC 16 EHF Beach Handball EURO and the Qualifier Tournaments for the Beach Handball EURO 2023, which were to be held in Moscow. In addition, it refused to allow competitions to be held in Russia. The Russian Handball Federation failed in its appeal against the decision to exclude Russia's teams from continental competition, which was rejected by the European Handball Federation Court of Handball.

== World Championships results ==
- 2004 – 1st place
- 2006 – 3rd place
- 2008 – 5th place
- 2018 – 7th place
