= Handball Federation Singapore =

Governing body of handball in Singapore

Handball Federation Singapore HFS
- IOC nation: Republic of Singapore (SGP)
- Sport: Handball
- Other sports: Beach handball
- Official website: www.hfs.org.sg

HISTORY
- Year of formation: 2008; 17 years ago

AFFILIATIONS
- International federation: International Handball Federation (IHF)
- IHF member since: 2009
- Continental association: Asian Handball Federation
- National Olympic Committee: Singapore National Olympic Council

GOVERNING BODY
- President: Kristian Weng Keong Thorbjornsen

HEADQUARTERS
- Address: Hougang Sports Hall, 93 Hougang Ave 4, #02-01, Singapore 538832
- Country: Singapore
- Secretary General: Kristian Thorbjornsen

The Handball Federation Singapore (HFS) is the administrative and controlling body for handball and beach handball in Republic of Singapore. Founded in 2008, HFS is a member of Asian Handball Federation (AHF) and the International Handball Federation (IHF).

== National teams ==
- Singapore men's national handball team
- Singapore women's national handball team
- Singapore national beach handball team
- Singapore women's national beach handball team
