= Egypt men's national beach handball team =

Egypt

Information
- Association: Egyptian Handball Federation
- Coach: Wael Abdul El Atty

Colours
Home	Away

Results

World Games
- Appearances: 2 (First in 2005)
- Best result: 6th (2005)

World Championship
- Appearances: 7 (First in 2004)
- Best result: (gold) (2004)
- Last updated on Unknown.

Egypt men's national beach handball team
Medal record

World Championship
Gold medal – first place	2004 Egypt	

African Championship
Gold medal – first place	2022 Morocco	

The Egyptian national beach handball team is the national team of Egypt. It is governed by the Egyptian Handball Federation and takes part in international beach handball competitions.

== Competitive record ==
Champions Runners-up Third place Fourth place

=== World Championships ===
Year	Round	GP	W	D	L	Final position
(Egypt) 2004	Champions	6	4	-	2	1st
(Brazil) 2006	Semi-Final	7	4	-	3	4th
(Spain) 2008	Semi-Final	7	3	-	4	4th
(Turkey) 2010	Semi-Final	10	4	-	6	4th
(Oman) 2012	Main Round	9	4	-	5	6th
(Brazil) 2014	Preliminary Round	9	4	-	5	8th
(Hungary) 2016	Main Round	9	3	-	6	8th
(Russia) 2018	Disqualified					
(Greece) 2022	Preliminary Round	9	3	-	6	15th
Total	8/9	66	29	-	37	-

=== World Games ===
Year	Position
(Germany) 2005	6th
(Poland) 2017	8th
Total	2/6

== See also ==
- Egypt men's national handball team
- Egypt men's national under-21 handball team
- Egypt men's national under-19 handball team
- Egypt men's national under-17 handball team
- Egypt national wheelchair handball team
