= Singapore men's national handball team =

National handball team of Singapore

Singapore

Information
- Association: Handball Federation Singapore
- Coach: Jack Ko

Colours
1st	2nd

Results

Asian Men's Handball Championship
- Appearances: 1 (First in 2022)
- Best result: 14th (2022)
- Last updated on Unknown.

The Singapore men's national handball team is the national handball team of Singapore. It is governed by the Handball Federation Singapore.

== Tournament history ==
=== Asian Championship ===
- 2022 – 14th place

== Men's team ==
Name	Position
Boo Yongfeng	Pivot
Viswanath ingaravello	Pivot
Anwaar Anwaarulhaaq	Center
Audrey Ho	Center
Maesten Mirnigar Bengum khan	Goalkeeper
Toh lay min	Right Back
Yeo Jun Song	Right Wing
Gloria Tan	Center
Jarina Banu Jagaffar	Right Wing
Jonathan Chuang Kwong Tze	Left Wing
Koh Jing Li	Left Back
Darius Tan Zhi Jie	Center
Edwin Chew Jin Da	Right Wing
Goh Aik Lang	Center
Mohd Zulfaqar	Right Wing
Jade Chong Yao Hui	Right Back

== Men's Youth Team ==
Name	Position
Heng Wei Ming Kendrick	Pivot
Jordan Tan Hou Jun	Goalkeeper
Ryan Toh	Left Wing
Ng Yi Kai	Pivot
Muhammad Zunnurain	Right Wing
Wong Hong Wei	Left Wing
Isaac Koh Vern	Goalkeeper
Eugene Low Zheng Xiang	Right Back
Nur Aziman Bin Rostam	Center Back
Muhammad Luthfi	Left Wing
Yeen Jinghao	Pivot
Javier Low Jia Heng	Left Back
Ong Zheng Feng	Pivot
Jeremiah Ang Kai Jie	Right Back
Hia Juay Tiak Alexander	Goalkeeper
Javier Liew Jun Yong	Left Wing
Dexter Tew Zhi Yong	Right Wing
Ahmad Tarish	Goalkeeper
Lim Zi En	Left Back
Ong Xiang Kai	Pivot
Adam Hizkil	Left Back
Cheng Chen Jun	Left Wing
Toh Yu Jie Galton	Goalkeeper
Nicholas Kon Yi-En	Center
