= 2028 Women's Beach Handball World Championships =

Tournament details
- Host country: Oman
- Venue: Salalah
- Dates: 3–8 July
- Teams: 16 (from 5 confederations)

The 2028 Women's Beach Handball World Championships will be the 12th edition of the championship, held in Salalah, Oman from 3 to 8 July 2028, under the aegis of International Handball Federation (IHF).

== Qualification ==
Qualification	Vacancies	Qualified
Host	1	Oman
Defending champion	1	Argentina
2027 Asian Beach Handball Championship	2	
2027 European Beach Handball Championship	6–7	
2027 Oceania Beach Handball Championship	1	
2028 South and Central American Beach Handball Championship	2–3	
2028 NACHC Beach Handball Championship	2	
Africa	1	
