= Southeast Asian Beach Handball Championship =

International beach handball competition

The Southeast Asian Beach Handball Championship is an international beach handball competition contested by national teams from Southeast Asia.

== History ==
The first edition of the championships which featured two separate competitions for men's and women's national teams was held in Dumaguete, Philippines at the Rizal Boulevard. The championships held from November 3 to 6, 2017, were organized on a short notice with Thailand and Vietnam invited to participate. Vietnam won both the inaugural men's and women's championship.

== Results ==
Men

Year	Host city	1st Place	2nd Place	3rd Place
2017	(Philippines); Dumaguete	Vietnam	Thailand	Philippines
2022	(Thailand); Bangkok	Thailand A	Thailand B	Philippines
2025	(Thailand); Suphan Buri	Philippines	Vietnam	Thailand
2026	(Thailand); Suphan Buri	Vietnam	Philippines	Thailand

Women

Year	Host city	1st Place	2nd Place	3rd Place
2017	(Philippines); Dumaguete	Vietnam	Thailand	Philippines
2022	(Thailand); Bangkok	Thailand	Vietnam	Indonesia
2025	(Thailand); Suphan Buri	Vietnam	Thailand	Philippines
2026	(Thailand); Suphan Buri	Vietnam	Philippines	Thailand

== Medal table ==
Rank	Nation	Gold	Silver	Bronze	Total
1	Vietnam	2	0	0	2
2	Thailand	0	2	0	2
3	Philippines	0	0	2	2
Totals (3 entries)		2	2	2	6
