= Philippines men's national beach handball team =

Philippines

Information
- Nickname: Amigos (transl. Comrades)
- Association: Philippine Handball Federation
- Coach: Joanna Franquelli

Colours
1st	2nd

Results

Asian Championship
- Appearances: 4 (First in 2019)
- Best result: 5th place (2022, 2023, 2025)
- Last updated on .

The Philippines national beach handball team is the national team of the Philippines. It takes part in international beach handball competitions and is governed by the Philippine Handball Federation.

== History ==
Nicknamed the "Amigos", the men's national team was formed shortly prior to the 2017 Southeast Asian Beach Handball Championship which was hosted at home in Dumaguete. The team finished third overall but secure a win against eventual champions Vietnam. The team was coached by Joanna Franquelli.

Franqueilli later led the squad at the 2018 International Beach Handball Grand Prix in Shandong, China where the national team reached at least the semifinal and the 2019 Asian Beach Handball Championship where the national team finished 8th place out of 12 teams in their competition debut.

They won a bronze medal at the 2019 Southeast Asian Games and a silver medal at the 2021 Southeast Asian Games.

The team won the 2025 Southeast Asian Beach Handball Championship title defeating Vietnam in the final.

== Results ==
=== Asian Beach Handball Championship ===
Champions Runners up Third place Fourth place

Asian Beach Handball Championship
Year	Round	Position	Pld	W	L	SW	SL	+/-
(China) 2019	-	8th place	-	-	-	-	-	-
(Iran) 2022	-	5th Place	-	-	-	-	-	
(Indonesia) 2023	-	5th Place	-	-	-	-	-	
(Oman) 2025	-	5th Place	-	-	-	-	-	
Total	0 Titles	5th Place	-	-	-	-	-	—

=== Southeast Asian Games ===
Champions Runners up Third place Fourth place

Southeast Asian Games
Year	Round	Position	Pld	W	L	SW	SL	+/-
(Philippines) 2019	Round Robin	3rd place	4	2	2	4	4	0
(Vietnam) 2021	Round Robin	2nd Place	6	4	2	9	5	+4
Total	0 Titles	2nd Place	10	6	4	13	9	+4

=== Southeast Asian Beach Handball Championship ===
Champions Runners up Third place Fourth place

Southeast Asian Beach Handball Championship
Year	Round	Position	Pld	W	L	SW	SL	+/-
(Philippines) 2019	Round Robin	3rd place	-	-	-	-	-	-
(Thailand) 2022	Round Robin	3rd place	-	-	-	-	-	-
(Thailand) 2025	Final	1st place	-	-	-	-	-	-
Total	1 Titles	1st Place	-	-	-	-	-	—

== Coach ==
- (Philippines) Joanna Franquelli (2017–)
