= Oman men's national beach handball team =

National team of Oman

Oman

Information
- Association: Oman Handball Association
- Coach: Hamood Al-Hasani
- Assistant coach: Jabir Al-Balushi

Colours
Home	Away

Results

World Championship
- Appearances: 8 (First in 2004)
- Best result: 8th (2004, 2012)
- Last updated on Unknown.

The Oman national beach handball team is the national team of Oman. It is governed by the Oman Handball Association and takes part in international beach handball competitions.

== World Championship results ==
Year	Position
(Egypt) 2004	8th place
(Brazil) 2006	Did not qualify
(Spain) 2008	Did not qualify
(Turkey) 2010	9th place
(Oman) 2012	8th place
(Brazil) 2014	12th place
(Hungary) 2016	7th place
(Russia) 2018	10th place
(Italy) 2020	Cancelled
(Greece) 2022	Did not qualify
(China) 2024	15th place
(Croatia) 2026	14th place
(Oman) 2028	Qualified
Total	9/11

== Asian Championship results ==
Year	Position
(Oman) 2004	1st place
(Iran) 2007	Did not Enter
(Oman) 2011	2nd place
(Hong Kong) 2013	2nd place
(Oman) 2015	2nd place
(Thailand) 2017	2nd place
(China) 2019	2nd place
(Iran) 2022	4th place
(Indonesia) 2023	2nd place
(Oman) 2025	1st place
Total	9/10
