= Bahrain men's national beach handball team =

Bahrain

Information
- Association: Bahrain Handball Association

Colours
| Home | Away |

Results

World Championship
- Appearances: 4 (First in 2004)
- Best result: 6th (2006)
- Last updated on Unknown.

The Bahrain national beach handball team is the national team of Bahrain. It is governed by the Bahrain Handball Federation and takes part in international beach handball competitions.

== World Championship results ==
| Year | Position |
|---|---|
| (Egypt) 2004 | 7th place |
| (Brazil) 2006 | 6th place |
| (Spain) 2008 | Did not Qualify |
| (Turkey) 2010 | Did not Qualify |
| (Oman) 2012 | 9th place |
| (Brazil) 2014 | Did not Qualify |
| (Hungary) 2016 | 9th place |
| (Russia) 2018 | Did not Qualify |
| (Italy) 2020 | Did not Qualify |
| Total | 4/9 |
