= Qatar men's national beach handball team =

Qatar

Information
- Association: Qatar Handball Association
- Coach: Khaled Aly

Colours
Home	Away

Results

World Championship
- Appearances: 7 (First in 2010)
- Best result: 3rd (2014, 2016)
- Last updated on Unknown.

Qatar men's national beach handball team
Medal record

World Championship
Bronze medal – third place	2014 Brazil	
Bronze medal – third place	2016 Hungary	

The Qatar national beach handball team is the national team of Qatar. It is governed by the Qatar Handball Association and takes part in international beach handball competitions.

== World Championships results ==
Year	Position
(Egypt) 2004	Did not Qualify
(Brazil) 2006	Did not Qualify
(Spain) 2008	Did not Qualify
(Turkey) 2010	10th place
(Oman) 2012	7th place
(Brazil) 2014	3rd place
(Hungary) 2016	3rd place
(Russia) 2018	9th place
(Italy) 2020	Cancelled
(Greece) 2022	5th place
(China) 2024	10th place
Total	8/10

== Asian Championship results ==
Year	Position
(Oman) 2004	Did not Enter
(Iran) 2007	Did not Enter
(Oman) 2011	1st place
(Hong Kong) 2013	1st place
(Oman) 2015	1st place
(Thailand) 2017	1st place
(China) 2019	1st place
(Iran) 2022	2nd place
(Indonesia) 2023	1st place
(Oman) 2025	Did not Enter
Total	7/10
