= European Beach Handball Championship =

European Beach Handball Championship may refer to:

- European Men's Beach Handball Championship
- European Women's Beach Handball Championship
