= Japan women's national beach handball team =

Japan

Information
- Association: Japan Handball Association

Colours
Home	Away

Results

World Championship
- Appearances: 2 (First in 2004)
- Best result: 7th (2004)
- Last updated on Unknown.

The Japan women's national beach handball team is the national team of Japan. It takes part in international beach handball competitions.

== World Championships results ==
- 2004 – 7th place
- 2010 – 10th place
