= Hong Kong women's national beach handball team =

Hong Kong

Information
- Association: Handball Association of Hong Kong, China

Colours
Home	Away

Results

World Championship
- Appearances: 1 (First in 2004)
- Best result: 8th (2004)
- Last updated on Unknown.

The Hong Kong women's national beach handball team is the national team of Hong Kong. It takes part in international beach handball competitions.

== World Championships results ==
- 2004 – 8th place
