= Thailand women's national beach handball team =

National beach handball team of Thailand

Thailand

Information
- Association: Handball Association of Thailand
- Coach: Narasak Hemnithi

Colours
| Home | Away |

Results

World Championship
- Appearances: 4 (First in 2012)
- Best result: 9th (2014, 2016)
- Last updated on Unknown.

The Thailand women's national beach handball team is the national team of Thailand. It is governed by the Handball Association of Thailand and takes part in international beach handball competitions.

== Results ==
=== World Championships ===
- 2012 – 11th place
- 2014 – 9th place
- 2016 – 9th place
- 2018 – 15th place
- 2022 – Qualified

=== Southeast Asian Beach Handball Championship ===
- 2017 – (silver)
