= China women's national beach handball team =

China

Information
- Association: Chinese Handball Association
- Coach: Shang Xi

Colours
Home	Away

Results

World Championship
- Appearances: 4 (First in 2008)
- Best result: 9th (2012)
- Last updated on Unknown.

The China women's national beach handball team is the national team of China. It is governed by the Chinese Handball Association and takes part in international beach handball competitions.

== World Championships results ==
- 2008 – 12th place
- 2010 – 11th place
- 2012 – 9th place
- 2024 – 14th place

== Beach handball at the Asian Beach Games ==
Beach handball at the Asian Beach Games
