= 2016 Beach Handball World Championships =

International handball competition

The 2016 Beach Handball World Championships was a twelve-team tournament in both men's and women's beach handball, held at Budapest, Hungary from 12 to 17 July 2016. It was the seventh edition of the event.

Croatia and Spain took home gold in the men's and women's event, both after defeating Brazil in the final.

== Format ==
The twelve teams were split into two groups of six teams. After playing a round-robin, the three top ranked team advanced to the main round. Every team kept the points from preliminary round matches against teams who also advance. In the main round every team had three games against the opponents they did not face in the preliminary round. The top four teams advanced to the semifinals. The three bottom ranked team from each preliminary round group were packed into one group. The points won against the teams who were also in this group were valid. Every team played three games and after those round there were placement matches from 7th–12th place.

Matches were played in sets, the team that wins two sets is the winner of a match. When teams were equal in points the head-to-head result was decisive.

== Draw ==
The draw was held on 12 May 2016. The schedule was released on 16 June 2016.

=== Seeding ===
Men

Pot 1	Pot 2	Pot 3	Pot 4	Pot 5	Pot 6
Brazil; Croatia	Qatar; Spain	Ukraine; Hungary	Oman; Egypt	United States; Uruguay	Australia; Bahrain

Women

Pot 1	Pot 2	Pot 3	Pot 4	Pot 5	Pot 6
Brazil; Hungary	Norway; Italy	Spain; Poland	Uruguay; Thailand	Chinese Taipei; Argentina	Australia; Tunisia

== Referees ==
Following 8 referee pairs were selected for the championship:

Referees
Argentina	Daniela Cajal / Lorena Mac Coll
Brazil	Sydney Antonio Dos Santos / Wanderson Oliveira
Greece	Mertinian / Syrepsios
Hungary	Dávid Palkovits / Gabor Szilvási

Referees
Qatar	Al-Heel / Al-Yazeedi
Tunisia	Aymen Ben Salah / Mohamed Kamel Drissi
Turkey / Poland	Kursad Erdogan / Agnieszka Skowronek
United Arab Emirates	Baqer / Bin Hasher

== Men ==
All times are local (UTC+2).

=== Preliminary round ===
==== Group A ====
Pos	Team	Pld	W	L	Pts	SW	SL	SR	SPW	SPL	SPR	Qualification
1	Brazil	5	5	0	10	10	3	3.333	210	166	1.265	Main round
2	Qatar	5	4	1	8	9	2	4.500	201	151	1.331	Main round
3	Ukraine	5	2	3	4 (Note: Ukraine 2–0 Egypt)	5	7	0.714	179	206	0.869	Main round
4	Egypt	5	2	3	4	5	8	0.625	171	174	0.983	Consolation round
5	Bahrain	5	1	4	2 (Note: United States 1–2 Bahrain)	4	9	0.444	179	199	0.899	Consolation round
6	United States	5	1	4	2	4	8	0.500	176	220	0.800	Consolation round

Source: IHF
Rules for classification: 1) Points; 2) Head-to-head points; 3) Head-to-head set difference; 4) Head-to-head points won; 5) Set difference; 6) Points won; 7) Draw.
Notes:

Team 1	Score	Team 2
12 July 2016
10:00
Brazil	2–1	Egypt
Qatar	2–0	Bahrain
Ukraine	0–2	United States
15:30
Bahrain	1–2	Ukraine
Egypt	0–2	Qatar
United States	0–2	Brazil
13 July 2016
11:40
Egypt	2–1	United States
Qatar	2–0	Ukraine
12:30
Brazil	2–0	Bahrain
17:20
Qatar	2–0	United States
18:10
Bahrain	1–2	Egypt
14 July 2016
11:20
Ukraine	1–2	Brazil
18:20
Brazil	2–1	Qatar
Ukraine	2–0	Egypt
United States	1–2	Bahrain

==== Group B ====
Pos	Team	Pld	W	L	Pts	SW	SL	SR	SPW	SPL	SPR	Qualification
1	Croatia	5	5	0	10	10	5	2.000	257	235	1.094	Main round
2	Spain	5	3	2	6 (Note: Spain 2 Pts, 3–2 SW; Hungary 2 Pts, 2–2 SW; Oman 2 Pts, 2–3 SW)	8	5	1.600	216	187	1.155	Main round
3	Hungary	5	3	2	6	7	4	1.750	217	188	1.154	Main round
4	Oman	5	3	2	6	7	5	1.400	188	202	0.931	Consolation round
5	Uruguay	5	1	4	2	4	9	0.444	185	196	0.944	Consolation round
6	Australia	5	0	5	0	2	10	0.200	143	198	0.722	Consolation round

Source: IHF
Rules for classification: 1) Points; 2) Head-to-head points; 3) Head-to-head set difference; 4) Head-to-head points won; 5) Set difference; 6) Points won; 7) Draw.
Notes:

Team 1	Score	Team 2
12 July 2016
12:30
Hungary	2–0	Uruguay
Croatia	2–1	Oman
Spain	2–0	Australia
18:00
Oman	2–1	Spain
18:50
Uruguay	1–2	Croatia
21:45
Australia	0–2	Hungary
13 July 2016
10:50
Spain	2–0	Hungary
Oman	2–0	Uruguay
Croatia	2–1	Australia
17:20
Australia	0–2	Oman
18:10
Hungary	1–2	Croatia
19:50
Spain	2–1	Uruguay
14 July 2016
12:30
Hungary	2–0	Oman
Croatia	2–1	Spain
Uruguay	2–1	Australia

=== Main round ===
Points obtained against teams from the same group are carried over.

Pos	Team	Pld	W	L	Pts	SW	SL	SR	SPW	SPL	SPR	Qualification
1	Brazil	5	4	1	8 (Note: Brazil 2–0 Croatia)	9	4	2.250	219	206	1.063	Semifinals
2	Croatia	5	4	1	8	8	4	2.000	261	216	1.208	Semifinals
3	Hungary	5	3	2	6	7	7	1.000	193	198	0.975	Semifinals
4	Qatar	5	2	3	4 (Note: Qatar 2–0 Spain)	6	6	1.000	156	142	1.099	Semifinals
5	Spain	5	2	3	4	5	6	0.833	206	200	1.030	Fifth place game
6	Ukraine	5	0	5	0	2	10	0.200	183	246	0.744	Fifth place game

Source: IHF
Rules for classification: 1) Points; 2) Head-to-head points; 3) Head-to-head set difference; 4) Head-to-head points won; 5) Set difference; 6) Points won; 7) Draw.
Notes:

Team 1	Score	Team 2
15 July 2016
10:50
Brazil	1–2	Hungary
11:40
Qatar	2–0	Spain
12:30
Ukraine	0–2	Croatia
18:10
Ukraine	1–2	Hungary
19:00
Brazil	2–0	Spain
19:50
Qatar	0–2	Croatia
16 July 2016
10:50
Brazil	2–0	Croatia
Qatar	1–2	Hungary
Ukraine	0–2	Spain

=== Consolation round ===
Points obtained against teams from the same group are carried over.

Pos	Team	Pld	W	L	Pts	SW	SL	SR	SPW	SPL	SPR	Qualification
1	Oman	5	3	2	6 (Note: Oman 4 Pts, 4–2 SW; Egypt 4 Pts, 4–4 SW; Uruguay 2 Pts, 3–5 SW; Bahrain 2 Pts, 4–4 SW. Bahrain 1–2 Uruguay after the first tie is broken.)	6	7	0.857	179	163	1.098	Seventh place game
2	Egypt	5	3	2	6	8	3	2.667	174	177	0.983	Seventh place game
3	Uruguay	5	3	2	6	7	6	1.167	207	186	1.113	Ninth place game
4	Bahrain	5	3	2	6	8	5	1.600	205	190	1.079	Ninth place game
5	Australia	5	2	3	4	5	7	0.714	160	182	0.879	Eleventh place game
6	United States	5	0	5	0	4	10	0.400	192	219	0.877	Eleventh place game

Source: IHF
Rules for classification: 1) Points; 2) Head-to-head points; 3) Head-to-head set difference; 4) Head-to-head points won; 5) Set difference; 6) Points won; 7) Draw.
Notes:

Team 1	Score	Team 2
15 July 2016
11:40
Bahrain	1–2	Uruguay
12:30
United States	1–2	Oman
Egypt	0–2	Australia
15:40
Egypt	2–1	Uruguay
United States	1–2	Australia
Bahrain	2–0	Oman
18:10
Egypt	0–2	Oman
19:00
United States	0–2	Uruguay
Bahrain	2–0	Australia

=== Placement matches ===
==== Eleventh place game ====
Team 1	Score	Team 2
16 July 2016
14:00
Australia	0–2	United States

==== Ninth place game ====
Team 1	Score	Team 2
16 July 2016
14:50
Uruguay	1–2	Bahrain

==== Seventh place game ====
Team 1	Score	Team 2
16 July 2016
15:40
Oman	2–1	Egypt

==== Fifth place game ====
Team 1	Score	Team 2
16 July 2016
16:30
Spain	2–0	Ukraine

=== Knockout stage ===
Semifinals
16 July – 16:30
Brazil	2
Qatar	0
16 July – 15:40
Croatia	2
Hungary	1

Final
16 July – 19:00
Brazil	0
Croatia	2
Third place
16 July – 17:00
Qatar	2
Hungary	1

=== Final ranking ===
Rank	Team
1st place, gold medalist(s)	Croatia
2nd place, silver medalist(s)	Brazil
3rd place, bronze medalist(s)	Qatar
4	Hungary
5	Spain
6	Ukraine
7	Oman
8	Egypt
9	Bahrain
10	Uruguay
11	United States
12	Australia

=== Awards ===
MVP

- (Croatia) Ivan Jurić

Topscorer

- (Qatar) Anis Zouaoui (126 points)

All-star team

- Goalkeeper: (Qatar) Mohsin Yafai
- Right wing: (Brazil) Nailson Amaral
- Left wing: (Croatia) Ivan Jurić
- Pivot: (Hungary) Attila Kun
- Defender: (Spain) Hagi Toure
- Specialist: (Brazil) Bruno Oliveira

Fair play award

- Spain

== Women ==
=== Preliminary round ===
==== Group A ====
Pos	Team	Pld	W	L	Pts	SW	SL	SR	SPW	SPL	SPR	Qualification
1	Spain	5	5	0	10	10	0	MAX	175	119	1.471	Main round
2	Hungary	5	4	1	8	8	4	2.000	169	163	1.037	Main round
3	Italy	5	3	2	6	6	4	1.500	157	145	1.083	Main round
4	Australia	5	2	3	4	5	7	0.714	152	158	0.962	Consolation round
5	Argentina	5	1	4	2	4	8	0.500	138	149	0.926	Consolation round
6	Thailand	5	0	5	0	0	10	0.000	138	195	0.708	Consolation round

Source: IHF
Rules for classification: 1) Points; 2) Head-to-head points; 3) Head-to-head set difference; 4) Head-to-head points won; 5) Set difference; 6) Points won; 7) Draw.

Team 1	Score	Team 2
12 July 2016
11:40
Hungary	2–0	Thailand
Italy	2–0	Australia
Spain	2–0	Argentina
17:10
Australia	0–2	Spain
Thailand	0–2	Italy
19:40
Argentina	1–2	Hungary
13 July 2016
11:40
Hungary	2–1	Australia
12:30
Thailand	0–2	Argentina
Italy	0–2	Spain
19:00
Spain	2–0	Hungary
Australia	2–0	Thailand
14 July 2016
11:40
Italy	2–0	Argentina
17:30
Hungary	2–0	Italy
Spain	2–0	Thailand
Argentina	1–2	Australia

==== Group B ====
Pos	Team	Pld	W	L	Pts	SW	SL	SR	SPW	SPL	SPR	Qualification
1	Brazil	5	5	0	10	10	0	MAX	220	110	2.000	Main round
2	Norway	5	3	2	6 (Note: Norway 2 Pts, 3–2 SW; Chinese Taipei 2 Pts, 2–2 SW; Poland 2 Pts, 2–3 SW)	7	4	1.750	218	164	1.329	Main round
3	Chinese Taipei	5	3	2	6	6	5	1.200	148	185	0.800	Main round
4	Poland	5	3	2	6	6	6	1.000	146	164	0.890	Consolation round
5	Tunisia	5	1	4	2	3	9	0.333	123	175	0.703	Consolation round
6	Uruguay	5	0	5	0	2	10	0.200	121	170	0.712	Consolation round

Source: IHF
Rules for classification: 1) Points; 2) Head-to-head points; 3) Head-to-head set difference; 4) Head-to-head points won; 5) Set difference; 6) Points won; 7) Draw.
Notes:

Team 1	Score	Team 2
12 July 2016
10:50
Brazil	2–0	Uruguay
Norway	2–0	Tunisia
Poland	0–2	Chinese Taipei
16:20
Tunisia	1–2	Poland
Chinese Taipei	0–2	Brazil
Uruguay	0–2	Norway
13 July 2016
10:00
Uruguay	1–2	Chinese Taipei
Brazil	2–0	Tunisia
Norway	1–2	Poland
16:30
Poland	0–2	Brazil
Norway	2–0	Chinese Taipei
Tunisia	2–1	Uruguay
14 July 2016
13:20
Brazil	2–0	Norway
Poland	2–0	Uruguay
Chinese Taipei	2–0	Tunisia

=== Main round ===
Points obtained against teams from the same group are carried over.

Pos	Team	Pld	W	L	Pts	SW	SL	SR	SPW	SPL	SPR	Qualification
1	Brazil	5	5	0	10	10	1	10.000	214	148	1.446	Semifinals
2	Norway	5	4	1	8	8	4	2.000	196	182	1.077	Semifinals
3	Spain	5	3	2	6	7	4	1.750	178	150	1.187	Semifinals
4	Hungary	5	2	3	4	6	6	1.000	167	166	1.006	Semifinals
5	Italy	5	1	4	2	2	9	0.222	143	170	0.841	Fifth place game
6	Chinese Taipei	5	0	5	0	1	10	0.100	145	226	0.642	Fifth place game

Source: IHF
Rules for classification: 1) Points; 2) Head-to-head points; 3) Head-to-head set difference; 4) Head-to-head points won; 5) Set difference; 6) Points won; 7) Draw.

Team 1	Score	Team 2
15 July 2016
10:00
Italy	0–2	Brazil
Hungary	1–2	Norway
11:40
Spain	2–0	Chinese Taipei
16:20
Italy	2–1	Chinese Taipei
17:20
Hungary	1–2	Brazil
20:40
Spain	1–2	Norway
16 July 2016
10:00
Spain	0–2	Brazil
Hungary	2–0	Chinese Taipei
Italy	0–2	Norway

=== Consolation round ===
Points obtained against teams from the same group are carried over.

Pos	Team	Pld	W	L	Pts	SW	SL	SR	SPW	SPL	SPR	Qualification
1	Australia	5	4	1	8 (Note: Argentina 1–2 Australia)	8	3	2.667	134	124	1.081	Seventh place game
2	Argentina	5	4	1	8	9	4	2.250	160	146	1.096	Seventh place game
3	Thailand	5	3	2	6 (Note: Thailand 2–1 Poland)	6	5	1.200	154	176	0.875	Ninth place game
4	Poland	5	3	2	6	8	5	1.600	163	157	1.038	Ninth place game
5	Tunisia	5	1	4	2	3	9	0.333	140	163	0.859	Eleventh place game
6	Uruguay	5	0	5	0	2	10	0.200	142	146	0.973	Eleventh place game

Source: IHF
Rules for classification: 1) Points; 2) Head-to-head points; 3) Head-to-head set difference; 4) Head-to-head points won; 5) Set difference; 6) Points won; 7) Draw.
Notes:

Team 1	Score	Team 2
15 July 2016
10:00
Thailand	2–1	Poland
10:50
Australia	2–0	Uruguay
Argentina	2–0	Tunisia
14:50
Argentina	2–1	Poland
Thailand	2–0	Uruguay
Australia	2–0	Tunisia
17:20
Australia	0–2	Poland
Thailand	2–0	Tunisia
18:10
Argentina	2–1	Uruguay

=== Placement matches ===
==== Eleventh place game ====
Team 1	Score	Team 2
16 July 2016
14:00
Tunisia	0–2	Uruguay

==== Ninth place game ====
Team 1	Score	Team 2
16 July 2016
14:50
Thailand	2–1	Poland

==== Seventh place game ====
Team 1	Score	Team 2
16 July 2016
15:40
Australia	0–2	Argentina

==== Fifth place game ====
Team 1	Score	Team 2
16 July 2016
16:30
Italy	2–0	Chinese Taipei

=== Knockout stage ===
Semifinals
16 July – 14:50
Brazil	2
Hungary	0
16 July – 14:00
Norway	1
Spain	2

Final
17 July – 18:00
Brazil	1
Spain	2
Third place
17 July – 16:00
Hungary	1
Norway	2

=== Final ranking ===
Rank	Team
1st place, gold medalist(s)	Spain
2nd place, silver medalist(s)	Brazil
3rd place, bronze medalist(s)	Norway
4	Hungary
5	Italy
6	Chinese Taipei
7	Argentina
8	Australia
9	Thailand
10	Poland
11	Uruguay
12	Tunisia

=== Awards ===
MVP

- (Brazil) Camila Souza

Topscorer

- (Hungary) Fruzsina Kretz (99 points)

All-star team

- Goalkeeper: (Norway) Regina Gulbrandsen
- Right wing: (Spain) Raquel Caño
- Left wing: (Brazil) Nathalie Sena
- Pivot: (Brazil) Renata Santiago
- Defender: (Spain) María García
- Specialist: (Hungary) Renáta Csiki

Fair play award

- Norway
