= Chinese Taipei women's national beach handball team =

Chinese Taipei (Taiwan)

Information
- Association: Chinese Taipei Handball Association
- Coach: Chu Chih-hua

Colours
Home	Away

Results

World Championship
- Appearances: 3 (First in 2014)
- Best result: 6th (2016)
- Last updated on Unknown.

The Chinese Taipei women's national beach handball team is the national team of Chinese Taipei (Taiwan). It takes part in international beach handball competitions.

== World Championships results ==
- 2014 – 10th place
- 2016 – 6th place
- 2018 – 13th place
- 2022 – Did not qualify
