= 2004 Beach Handball World Championships =

International beach handball competition

The 2004 Beach Handball World Championships are a nine-team tournament in both men's and women's beach handball, held at El Gouna in Egypt in 2004. This were the first ever beach handball world championships held in history of the sport. Matches are played in sets, the team that wins two sets is the winner of a match. When teams are equal in points the head-to-head result is decisive.

== Men's tournament ==
=== Group stage ===
==== Group A ====
| Team | Pts | Pld | W | L | SW | SL |
|---|---|---|---|---|---|---|
| Russia | 6 | 3 | 3 | 0 | 6 | 1 |
| Egypt | 4 | 3 | 2 | 1 | 5 | 3 |
| Hungary | 2 | 3 | 1 | 2 | 3 | 4 |
| Oman | 0 | 3 | 0 | 3 | 0 | 6 |

Hungary - Russia 0:2 (12:17, 6:8)
Oman - Egypt 0:2 (12:15, 17:19)
Russia - Oman 2:0 (23:8, 18:14)
Egypt - Hungary 2: 1 (12:8, 9:10, 9:6)
Russia - Egypt 2:1 (11:15, 16:15, 7:6)
Oman - Hungary 0:2 (13:14, 10:15)

==== Group B ====
| Team | Pts | Pld | W | L | SW | SL |
|---|---|---|---|---|---|---|
| Croatia | 6 | 4 | 3 | 1 | 7 | 2 |
| Turkey | 4 | 4 | 2 | 2 | 4 | 5 |
| Ukraine | 4 | 4 | 2 | 2 | 5 | 5 |
| Bahrain | 4 | 4 | 2 | 2 | 5 | 6 |
| Brazil | 2 | 4 | 1 | 3 | 4 | 6 |

Turkey - Ukraine 2:1 (12:4, 8:9, 7:6)
Brazil - Croatia 0:2 (10:21, 10:15)
Bahrain - Turkey 0:2 (17:21, 16:21)
Ukraine - Brazil 2:0 (14:12, 20:16)
Brazil - Bahrain 1:2 (15:14, 10:13, 8:9)
Croatia - Ukraine 2:0 (11:10, 17:16)
Ukraine - Bahrain 2:1 (23:10, 4:10, 12:10)
Croatia - Turkey 2:0 (20:18, 24:14)
Bahrain - Croatia 2:1 (14:12, 18:24, 9:4)
Turkey - Brazil 0:2 (13:14, 16:17)

- Note: Places 2–4 are determined by the results of head-to-head matches.

=== Quarter finals ===
Russia - Bahrain 2:1 (19:14, 16:19, 8:4)
Egypt - Ukraine 2:0 (21:10, 15:10)
Turkey - Hungary 2:1 (9:8, 5:9, 7:6)
Croatia - Oman 2:0 (27:9, 12:9)

=== 5th—8th place semifinals ===
Bahrain - Hungary 0:2 (9:22, 18:20)
Ukraine - Oman 2:0 (13:3, 13:12)

=== Semi finals ===
Russia - Turkey 1:2 (16:17, 20:8, 2:5)
Egypt - Croatia 2:0 (18:14, 19:18)

=== 7th place match ===
Bahrain - Oman 2:1 (14:18, 16:14, 5:4)

=== 5th place match ===
Hungary - Ukraine 1:2 (20:10, 14:20, 6:8)

=== 3rd place match ===
Russia - Croatia 2:1 (16:10, 18:19, 10:8)

=== Final ===
Egypt - Turkey 2:1 (19:13, 10:16, 5:0)

=== Awards ===
==== All-Star Team ====
- (Egypt) Hamdy Abdel Fatah
- (Turkey) Ozgur Eryilmaz
- (Bahrain) Raid Al Marzooq
- (Russia) Serguei Predybailov

== Women's tournament ==
=== Group stage ===
| Team | Pts | Pld | W | L | SW | SL |
|---|---|---|---|---|---|---|
| Russia | 12 | 7 | 6 | 1 | 13 | 3 |
| Turkey | 12 | 7 | 6 | 1 | 12 | 3 |
| Italy | 12 | 7 | 6 | 1 | 12 | 3 |
| Croatia | 6 | 7 | 3 | 4 | 7 | 9 |
| Hungary | 6 | 7 | 3 | 4 | 8 | 9 |
| Brazil | 6 | 7 | 3 | 4 | 8 | 9 |
| Japan | 2 | 7 | 1 | 6 | 2 | 12 |
| Hong Kong | 0 | 7 | 0 | 7 | 0 | 14 |

Russia - Hungary 2:0 (10:7, 13:6)
Croatia - Turkey 0:2 (14:19, 11:13)
Brazil - Italy 0:2 (11:12, 6:9)
Japan - Hong Kong 2:0
Turkey - Russia 0:2 (12:13, 15:18)
Hungary - Italy 0:2 (6:13, 11:12)
Hong Kong - Croatia 0:2
Brazil - Japan 2:0
Russia - Italy 1:2 (16:12, 10:11, 3:5)
Hong Kong - Turkey 0:2
Japan - Hungary 0:2
Croatia - Brazil 2:1
Hong Kong - Russia 0:2 (2:15, 1:23)
Italy - Japan 2:0 (16:7, 12:6)
Turkey - Brazil 2:0 (16:15, 13:9)
Hungary - Croatia 2:1 (16:20, 18:17, 6:4)
Russia - Japan 2:0 (14:9, 12:4)
Brazil - Hong Kong 2:0
Italy - Croatia 2:0 (13:11, 15:13)
Turkey - Hungary 2:1 (9:10, 12:8, 5:0)
Brazil - Russia 1:2 (13:12, 15:20, 5:8)
Croatia - Japan 2:0
Hong Kong - Hungary 0:2
Italy - Turkey 0:2 (8:12, 10:11)
Russia - Croatia 2:0 (16:5, 18:6)
Hungary - Brazil 1:2
Turkey - Japan 2:0
Hong Kong - Italy 0:2

- Note: Places 1–6 are determined by the results of head-to-head matches.

=== Final ===
Russia - Turkey 2:1 (13:8, 8:15, 4:2)

=== Awards ===
==== All-Star Team ====
- (Brazil) Mayssa Raquel
- (Italy) Daniela Sposi
- (Turkey) Yeliz Ozel
- (Russia) Natalia Evtoukhova

== Final rankings ==
=== Men ===
| POS | Team |
|---|---|
| 1st place, gold medalist(s) | Egypt |
| 2nd place, silver medalist(s) | Turkey |
| 3rd place, bronze medalist(s) | Russia |
| 4. | Croatia |
| 5. | Ukraine |
| 6. | Hungary |
| 7. | Bahrain |
| 8. | Oman |
| 9. | Brazil |

=== Women ===
| POS | Team |
|---|---|
| 1st place, gold medalist(s) | Russia |
| 2nd place, silver medalist(s) | Turkey |
| 3rd place, bronze medalist(s) | Italy |
| 4. | Croatia |
| 5. | Hungary |
| 6. | Brazil |
| 7. | Japan |
| 8. | Hong Kong |
