= 2012 Beach Handball World Championships =

International beach handball competition

The 2012 Beach Handball World Championships was a twelve-team tournament in both men's and women's beach handball, held at Muscat, Oman from July 8–13, 2012. It was the fifth edition of the event. Matches were played in sets, the team that won two sets was the winner of a match. When teams were equal in points the head-to-head result would be decisive.

Brazil won both editions, the men and women competition.

== Format ==
The twelve teams were split into two groups of six teams. After playing a round-robin, the three top ranked team advanced to the Main Round. Every team kept the points from preliminary round matches against teams who also advanced. In the main round every team had 3 games against the opponents they did not face in the preliminary round. The top four teams advanced to the Semifinals. The three bottom ranked team from each preliminary round group were packed into one group. The points won against the teams who were also in this group were valid. Every team played three games and after those round there were placement matches from 7th–12th place.

== Men ==
The draw was held on May 14.

=== Participating nations ===
Group A	Group B
Brazil; Russia; Ukraine; Oman; Bahrain; Australia	Croatia; Egypt; Spain; Qatar; Uruguay; Kuwait

=== Preliminary round ===
Team advance to Main Round
Team competes in Consolation Round

==== Group A ====
Team	Pld	W	L	SW	SL	Pts
Russia	5	4	1	9	3	8
Brazil	5	4	1	9	2	8
Ukraine	5	3	2	6	5	6
Oman	5	3	2	7	6	6
Bahrain	5	1	5	3	8	2
Australia	5	0	5	0	10	0

Team 1	Score	Team 2
8 July 2012
Ukraine	2–0	Bahrain
Russia	2–0	Australia
Brazil	2–0	Oman
Bahrain	0–2	Brazil
Australia	0–2	Ukraine
Oman	2–1	Russia
9 July 2012
Oman	2–1	Bahrain
Russia	2–0	Ukraine
Brazil	2–0	Australia
Russia	2–0	Bahrain
Ukraine	0–2	Brazil
Australia	0–2	Oman
10 July 2012
Bahrain	2–0	Australia
Brazil	1–2	Russia
Ukraine	2–1	Oman

==== Group B ====
Team	Pld	W	L	SW	SL	Pts
Croatia	5	4	1	9	3	8
Egypt	5	4	1	8	5	8
Spain	5	3	2	7	4	6
Qatar	5	3	2	7	5	6
Kuwait	5	1	4	3	9	2
Uruguay	5	0	5	2	10	0

Team 1	Score	Team 2
8 July 2012
Croatia	1–2	Qatar
Spain	2–0	Uruguay
Egypt	2–1	Kuwait
Kuwait	0–2	Spain
Qatar	1–2	Egypt
Uruguay	0–2	Croatia
9 July 2012
Qatar	2–0	Uruguay
Egypt	2–0	Spain
Croatia	2–0	Kuwait
Spain	1–2	Croatia
Kuwait	0–2	Qatar
Egypt	2–1	Uruguay
10 July 2012
Spain	2–0	Qatar
Uruguay	1–2	Kuwait
Croatia	2–0	Egypt

=== Main round (Group C) ===
Team	Pld	W	L	SW	SL	Pts
Russia	5	5	0	10	2	10
Brazil	5	4	1	9	5	8
Croatia	5	3	2	8	5	6
Ukraine	5	2	3	4	8	4
Egypt	5	1	4	4	8	2
Spain	5	0	5	3	10	0

Team 1	Score	Team 2
11 July 2012
Russia	2–0	Spain
Brazil	2–1	Egypt
Ukraine	0–2	Croatia
Russia	2–0	Egypt
Brazil	2–1	Croatia
Ukraine	2–1	Spain
12 July 2012
Russia	2–1	Croatia
Ukraine	2–1	Egypt
Brazil	2–1	Spain

=== Consolation round (Group D) ===
Team	Pld	W	L	SW	SL	Pts
Oman	5	5	0	10	2	10
Qatar	5	4	1	9	2	8
Kuwait	5	3	2	6	6	6
Bahrain	5	2	3	6	7	4
Uruguay	5	1	4	4	8	2
Australia	5	0	5	0	10	0

Team 1	Score	Team 2
11 July 2012
Oman	2–0	Uruguay
Bahrain	1–2	Kuwait
Australia	0–2	Qatar
12 July 2012
Australia	0–2	Uruguay
Oman	2–0	Kuwait
Bahrain	2–1	Qatar
Australia	0–2	Kuwait
Oman	2–1	Qatar
Bahrain	2–1	Uruguay

=== Placement matches ===
==== Eleventh place game ====
13 July 2012
Team 1	Score	Team 2
Uruguay	2–0	Australia

==== Ninth place game ====
13 July 2012
Team 1	Score	Team 2
Kuwait	0–2	Bahrain

==== Seventh place game ====
13 July 2012
Team 1	Score	Team 2
Oman	1–2	Qatar

==== Fifth place game ====
13 July 2012
Team 1	Score	Team 2
Egypt	1–2	Spain

=== Finals ===
Semi-finals
12 July
Russia	1
Ukraine	2
12 July
Brazil	2
Croatia	0

Final
13 July
Ukraine	1
Brazil	2
Third place
13 July
Russia	0
Croatia	2

==== Semifinals ====
Team 1	Score	Team 2
12 July 2012
Russia	1–2	Ukraine
Brazil	2–0	Croatia

==== Third place game ====
13 July 2012
Team 1	Score	Team 2
Russia	0–2	Croatia

==== Final ====
13 July 2012
Team 1	Score	Team 2
Ukraine	1–2	Brazil

=== Final ranking ===
Rank	Team
1st place, gold medalist(s)	Brazil
2nd place, silver medalist(s)	Ukraine
3rd place, bronze medalist(s)	Croatia
4	Russia
5	Spain
6	Egypt
7	Qatar
8	Oman
9	Bahrain
10	Kuwait
11	Uruguay
12	Australia

=== Awards ===
MVP

- Viktor Ladiko (UKR)

Topscorer

- Alexandr Tatarintsev (RUS)

All-star team

- Goalkeeper: Igor Totić (CRO)
- Left wing: Said Hamed Saud (OMN)
- Pivot: Alexandr Tatarintsev (RUS)
- Right wing: Gulliver Wellington (BRA)
- Specialist: Viktor Ladiko (UKR)
- Defender: Diogo Vieria (BRA)

Fair play award

- Spain

Chosen by team officials and IHF experts: IHF.info

== Women ==
The draw was held on May 14.

=== Participating nations ===
Group A	Group B
Croatia; Denmark; Italy; China; Uruguay; Australia	Norway; Brazil; Hungary; Thailand; Poland; Singapore

=== Preliminary round ===
Team advance to Main Round
Team competes in Consolation Round

==== Group A ====
Team	Pld	W	L	SW	SL	Pts
Denmark	5	4	1	8	3	8
Croatia	5	4	1	9	3	8
Uruguay	5	3	2	7	5	6
Italy	5	2	3	6	6	4
Australia	5	1	4	2	8	2
China	5	1	4	2	8	2

Team 1	Score	Team 2
8 July 2012
Croatia	2–0	China
Italy	1–2	Uruguay
Denmark	2–0	Australia
Australia	0–2	Italy
Uruguay	1–2	Croatia
China	0–2	Denmark
9 July 2012
Denmark	2–1	Italy
China	2–0	Uruguay
Croatia	2–0	Australia
Italy	0–2	Croatia
Australia	2–0	China
Denmark	0–2	Uruguay
10 July 2012
Uruguay	2–0	Australia
Italy	2–0	China
Croatia	1–2	Denmark

==== Group B ====
Team	Pld	W	L	SW	SL	Pts
Brazil	5	5	0	10	0	10
Norway	5	4	1	8	2	8
Hungary	5	3	2	6	5	6
Poland	5	2	3	5	7	4
Thailand	5	1	4	3	8	2
Singapore	5	0	5	0	10	0

Team 1	Score	Team 2
8 July 2012
Hungary	2–1	Poland
Brazil	2–0	Singapore
Norway	2–0	Thailand
Thailand	0–2	Brazil
Singapore	0–2	Hungary
Poland	0–2	Norway
9 July 2012
Norway	2–0	Singapore
Thailand	1–2	Poland
Brazil	2–0	Hungary
Singapore	0–2	Thailand
Hungary	0–2	Norway
Brazil	2–0	Poland
10 July 2012
Poland	2–0	Singapore
Hungary	2–0	Thailand
Norway	0–2	Brazil

=== Main round (Group C) ===
Team	Pld	W	L	SW	SL	Pts
Denmark	5	4	1	8	4	8
Brazil	5	3	2	7	5	6
Norway	5	3	2	7	5	6
Hungary	5	2	3	4	7	4
Croatia	5	2	3	7	8	4
Uruguay	5	1	4	4	8	2

Team 1	Score	Team 2
11 July 2012
Denmark	2–0	Hungary
Croatia	1–2	Norway
Uruguay	1–2	Brazil
Denmark	2–1	Norway
Croatia	2–1	Brazil
Uruguay	0–2	Hungary
12 July 2012
Denmark	2–0	Brazil
Uruguay	0–2	Norway
Croatia	1–2	Hungary

=== Consolation round (Group D) ===
Team	Pld	W	L	SW	SL	Pts
Italy	5	5	0	10	1	10
Australia	5	3	2	6	5	6
China	5	3	2	6	4	6
Poland	5	2	3	6	7	4
Thailand	5	2	3	5	6	4
Singapore	5	0	5	0	10	0

Team 1	Score	Team 2
11 July 2012
Italy	2–0	Singapore
Australia	0–2	Thailand
China	2–0	Poland
China	2–0	Singapore
Italy	2–0	Thailand
Australia	2–1	Poland
12 July 2012
China	2–0	Thailand
Italy	2–1	Poland
Australia	2–0	Singapore

=== Placement matches ===
==== Eleventh place game ====
13 July 2012
Team 1	Score	Team 2
Thailand	2–0	Singapore

==== Ninth place game ====
13 July 2012
Team 1	Score	Team 2
China	2–1	Poland

==== Seventh place game ====
13 July 2012
Team 1	Score	Team 2
Italy	2–0	Australia

==== Fifth place game ====
13 July 2012
Team 1	Score	Team 2
Croatia	2–0	Uruguay

=== Finals ===
Semi-finals
12 July
Denmark	2
Hungary	0
12 July
Brazil	2
Norway	0

Final
13 July
Denmark	0
Brazil	2
Third place
13 July
Hungary	0
Norway	2

==== Semifinals ====
Team 1	Score	Team 2
12 July 2012
Denmark	2–0	Hungary
Brazil	2–0	Norway

==== Third place game ====
13 July 2012
Team 1	Score	Team 2
Hungary	0–2	Norway

==== Final ====
13 July 2012
Team 1	Score	Team 2
Denmark	0–2	Brazil

=== Final ranking ===
Rank	Team
1st place, gold medalist(s)	Brazil
2nd place, silver medalist(s)	Denmark
3rd place, bronze medalist(s)	Norway
4	Hungary
5	Croatia
6	Uruguay
7	Italy
8	Australia
9	China
10	Poland
11	Thailand
12	Singapore

=== Awards ===
MVP

- Patricia Scheppa (BRA)

Topscorer

- Boszana Fekete (HUN)

All-star team

- Goalkeeper: Ágnes Győri (HUN)
- Left wing: Millena Braga (BRA)
- Pivot: Ana Brustven (NOR)
- Right wing: Patricia Scheppa (BRA)
- Specialist: Maj Thornoe Johansen (DEN)
- Defender: Anja Daskiljević (CRO)

Fair play award

- Norway

Chosen by team officials and IHF experts: IHF.info
