= 2014 Beach Handball World Championships =

International beach handball competition

The 2014 Beach Handball World Championships were a twelve-team tournament in both men's and women's beach handball, held at Recife, Brazil from 22–27 July, 2014. It was the sixth edition of the event.

Just like two years prior, Brazil again won the gold medal in both, the men's and women's competition.

== Format ==
The twelve teams were split into two groups of six teams. After playing a round-robin, the three top ranked team advanced to the Main Round. Every team kept the points from preliminary round matches against teams who also advanced. In the main round every team had 3 games against the opponents they did not face in the preliminary round. The top four teams advanced to the Semifinals. The three bottom ranked team from each preliminary round group were packed into one group. The points won against the teams who were also in this group were valid. Every team played three games and after those round there wereplacement matches from 7th–12th place.

Matches were played in sets, the team that wins two sets is the winner of a match. When teams are equal in points the head-to-head result was decisive.

== Draw ==
The draw was held on 9 May.

== Men ==
=== Participating nations ===
Group A	Group B
Uruguay; Oman; Serbia; Denmark; Australia; Brazil	Argentina; Qatar; Egypt; Russia; Spain; Croatia

=== Preliminary round ===
Team advance to Main Round
Team competes in Consolation Round

==== Group A ====
Team	Pld	W	L	SW	SL	Pts
Brazil	5	5	0	10	0	10
Denmark	5	4	1	8	2	8
Serbia	5	3	2	6	6	6
Uruguay	5	2	3	5	7	4
Oman	5	1	4	3	8	2
Australia	5	0	5	1	10	0

Team 1	Score	Team 2
22 July 2014
Brazil	2–0	Oman
Denmark	2–0	Australia
Serbia	2–1	Uruguay
Uruguay	0–2	Brazil
Australia	1–2	Serbia
Oman	0–2	Denmark
23 July 2014
Denmark	2–0	Serbia
Oman	1–2	Uruguay
Brazil	2–0	Australia
24 July 2014
Australia	0–2	Oman
Serbia	0–2	Brazil
Denmark	2–0	Uruguay
Uruguay	2–0	Australia
Brazil	2–0	Denmark
Serbia	2–0	Oman

==== Group B ====
Team	Pld	W	L	SW	SL	Pts
Croatia	5	4	1	8	4	8
Qatar	5	4	1	8	4	8
Spain	5	3	2	7	4	6
Egypt	5	2	3	4	6	4
Russia	5	2	3	6	8	4
Argentina	5	0	5	3	10	0

Team 1	Score	Team 2
22 July 2014
Croatia	2–0	Qatar
Russia	2–1	Spain
Egypt	2–0	Argentina
Argentina	1–2	Croatia
Spain	2–0	Egypt
Qatar	2–1	Russia
23 July 2014
Russia	0–2	Egypt
Qatar	2–1	Argentina
Croatia	0–2	Spain
24 July 2014
Spain	0–2	Qatar
Egypt	0–2	Croatia
Russia	2–1	Argentina
Argentina	0–2	Spain
Croatia	2–1	Russia
Egypt	0–2	Qatar

=== Main round (Group C) ===
Team	Pld	W	L	SW	SL	Pts
Brazil	5	5	0	10	2	10
Denmark	5	4	1	8	4	8
Croatia	5	2	3	5	6	4
Qatar	5	2	3	5	7	4
Spain	5	2	3	6	6	4
Serbia	5	0	5	1	10	0

Team 1	Score	Team 2
25 July 2014
Serbia	0–2	Croatia
Denmark	2–0	Qatar
Brazil	2–1	Spain
Brazil	2–1	Qatar
Serbia	0–2	Spain
Denmark	2–1	Croatia
26 July 2014
Denmark	2–1	Spain
Serbia	1–2	Qatar
Brazil	2–0	Croatia

=== Consolation round (Group D) ===
Team	Pld	W	L	SW	SL	Pts
Egypt	5	4	1	8	3	8
Russia	5	4	1	8	3	8
Argentina	5	3	2	7	4	6
Uruguay	5	2	3	5	7	4
Oman	5	2	3	5	6	4
Australia	5	0	5	0	10	0

Team 1	Score	Team 2
25 July 2014
Oman	0–2	Russia
Uruguay	0–2	Argentina
Australia	0–2	Egypt
Uruguay	0–2	Russia
Oman	2–0	Egypt
Australia	0–2	Argentina
26 July 2014
Oman	0–2	Argentina
Australia	0–2	Russia
Uruguay	1–2	Egypt

=== Placement matches ===
==== Eleventh place game ====
26 July 2014
Team 1	Score	Team 2
Oman	1–2	Australia

==== Ninth place game ====
26 July 2014
Team 1	Score	Team 2
Argentina	0–2	Uruguay

==== Seventh place game ====
26 July 2014
Team 1	Score	Team 2
Egypt	0–2	Russia

==== Fifth place game ====
26 July 2014
Team 1	Score	Team 2
Spain	2–0	Serbia

=== Finals ===
Semi-finals
26 July
Brazil	2
Qatar	0
26 July
Denmark	1
Croatia	2

Final
27 July
Brazil	2
Croatia	1
Third place
27 July
Qatar	2
Denmark	1

=== Final ranking ===
Rank	Team
1st place, gold medalist(s)	Brazil
2nd place, silver medalist(s)	Croatia
3rd place, bronze medalist(s)	Qatar
4	Denmark
5	Spain
6	Serbia
7	Russia
8	Egypt
9	Uruguay
10	Argentina
11	Australia
12	Oman

=== Awards ===
MVP

- Martin Andersen (DEN)

Topscorer

- Juan Vásquez Díz (ESP)

All-star team

- Goalkeeper: Igor Totić (CRO)
- Right wing: Nailson Amaral (BRA)
- Left wing: Juan Vásquez Díz (ESP)
- Pivot: Gil Pires (BRA)
- Defender: Ahmed Morgan (QAT)
- Specialist: Martin Andersen (DEN)

Fair play award

- Spain

Chosen by team officials and IHF experts: IHF.info

== Women ==
=== Participating nations ===
Group A	Group B
Italy; Chinese Taipei; Australia; Uruguay; Norway; Brazil	Spain; Thailand; Argentina; Ukraine; Denmark; Hungary

=== Preliminary round ===
Team advance to Main Round
Team competes in Consolation Round

==== Group A ====
Team	Pld	W	L	SW	SL	Pts
Brazil	5	5	0	10	0	10
Norway	5	4	1	8	3	8
Italy	5	3	2	6	5	6
Uruguay	5	2	3	4	6	4
Chinese Taipei	5	1	4	3	9	2
Australia	5	0	5	2	10	0

Team 1	Score	Team 2
22 July 2014
Brazil	2–0	Australia
Norway	2–0	Italy
Uruguay	2–0	Chinese Taipei
Chinese Taipei	0–2	Brazil
Italy	2–0	Uruguay
Australia	1–2	Norway
23 July 2014
Norway	2–0	Uruguay
Australia	1–2	Chinese Taipei
Brazil	2–0	Italy
Italy	2–0	Australia
Uruguay	0–2	Brazil
Norway	2–0	Chinese Taipei
24 July 2014
Chinese Taipei	1–2	Italy
Brazil	2–0	Norway
Uruguay	2–0	Australia

==== Group B ====
Team	Pld	W	L	SW	SL	Pts
Hungary	5	4	1	8	3	8
Ukraine	5	3	2	7	5	6
Spain	5	3	2	8	4	6
Denmark	5	3	2	6	4	6
Thailand	5	1	4	2	9	2
Argentina	5	1	4	3	9	2

Team 1	Score	Team 2
22 July 2014
Hungary	2–0	Thailand
Denmark	0–2	Spain
Ukraine	1–2	Argentina
Argentina	0–2	Hungary
Spain	1–2	Ukraine
Thailand	0–2	Denmark
23 July 2014
Denmark	0–2	Ukraine
Thailand	2–1	Argentina
Hungary	2–1	Spain
24 July 2014
Spain	2–0	Thailand
Ukraine	0–2	Hungary
Denmark	2–0	Argentina
Argentina	0–2	Spain
Hungary	0–2	Denmark
Ukraine	2–0	Thailand

=== Main round (Group C) ===
Team	Pld	W	L	SW	SL	Pts
Brazil	5	5	0	10	0	10
Hungary	5	4	1	8	4	8
Ukraine	5	3	2	6	6	6
Norway	5	2	3	6	6	4
Spain	5	1	4	4	8	2
Italy	5	0	5	0	10	0

Team 1	Score	Team 2
25 July 2014
Norway	1–2	Ukraine
Italy	0–2	Hungary
Brazil	2–0	Spain
Norway	1–2	Hungary
Brazil	2–0	Ukraine
Italy	0–2	Spain
26 July 2014
Italy	0–2	Ukraine
Norway	2–0	Spain
Brazil	2–0	Hungary

=== Consolation round (Group D) ===
Team	Pld	W	L	SW	SL	Pts
Denmark	5	5	0	10	1	10
Uruguay	5	3	2	8	4	6
Thailand	5	2	3	5	8	4
Chinese Taipei	5	2	3	5	7	4
Australia	5	2	3	5	7	4
Argentina	5	1	4	3	9	2

Team 1	Score	Team 2
25 July 2014
Australia	0–2	Denmark
Uruguay	1–2	Argentina
Chinese Taipei	1–2	Thailand
Chinese Taipei	0–2	Denmark
Australia	2–0	Argentina
Uruguay	2–0	Thailand
26 July 2014
Chinese Taipei	2–0	Argentina
Australia	2–1	Thailand
Uruguay	1–2	Denmark

=== Placement matches ===
==== Eleventh place game ====
26 July 2014
Team 1	Score	Team 2
Australia	0–2	Argentina

==== Ninth place game ====
26 July 2014
Team 1	Score	Team 2
Thailand	2–0	Chinese Taipei

==== Seventh place game ====
26 July 2014
Team 1	Score	Team 2
Denmark	2–0	Uruguay

==== Fifth place game ====
26 July 2014
Team 1	Score	Team 2
Spain	2–0	Italy

=== Finals ===
Semi-finals
26 July
Brazil	2
Norway	1
26 July
Hungary	2
Ukraine	0

Final
27 July
Brazil	2
Hungary	0
Third place
27 July
Norway	2
Ukraine	1

=== Final ranking ===
Rank	Team
1st place, gold medalist(s)	Brazil
2nd place, silver medalist(s)	Hungary
3rd place, bronze medalist(s)	Norway
4	Ukraine
5	Spain
6	Italy
7	Denmark
8	Uruguay
9	Thailand
10	Chinese Taipei
11	Argentina
12	Australia

=== Awards ===
MVP

- Camila Souza (BRA)

Topscorer

- Catherine Kornvald (NOR)

All-star team

- Goalkeeper: Ágnes Győri (HUN)
- Right wing: Olga Laiuk (UKR)
- Left wing: Catherine Kornvald (NOR)
- Pivot: Renata Santiago (BRA)
- Defender: Anika Niederwieser (ITA)
- Specialist: Maj Tornøe Johansen (DEN)

Fair play award

- Hungary

Chosen by team officials and IHF experts: IHF.info
