= 2008 Beach Handball World Championships =

International beach handball competition

The 2008 Beach Handball World Championships are a twelve-team tournament in both men's and women's beach handball, held in the Cadiz at Cadiz beach in Andalusia, Spain between July 9 and July 13 .

== Men ==
Final ranking

Rank	Team
1st place, gold medalist(s)	Croatia
2nd place, silver medalist(s)	Brazil
3rd place, bronze medalist(s)	Serbia
4.	Egypt
5.	Spain
6.	Turkey
7.	Hungary
8.	Russia
9.	Uruguay
10.	Pakistan
11.	Iran
12.	Libya

== Women ==
Final ranking

Rank	Team
1st place, gold medalist(s)	Croatia
2nd place, silver medalist(s)	Spain
3rd place, bronze medalist(s)	Brazil
4.	Italy
5.	Russia
6.	Norway
7.	Uruguay
8.	Serbia
9.	Ukraine
10.	Macedonia
11.	Dominican Republic
12.	China
