= Beach handball =

Sport

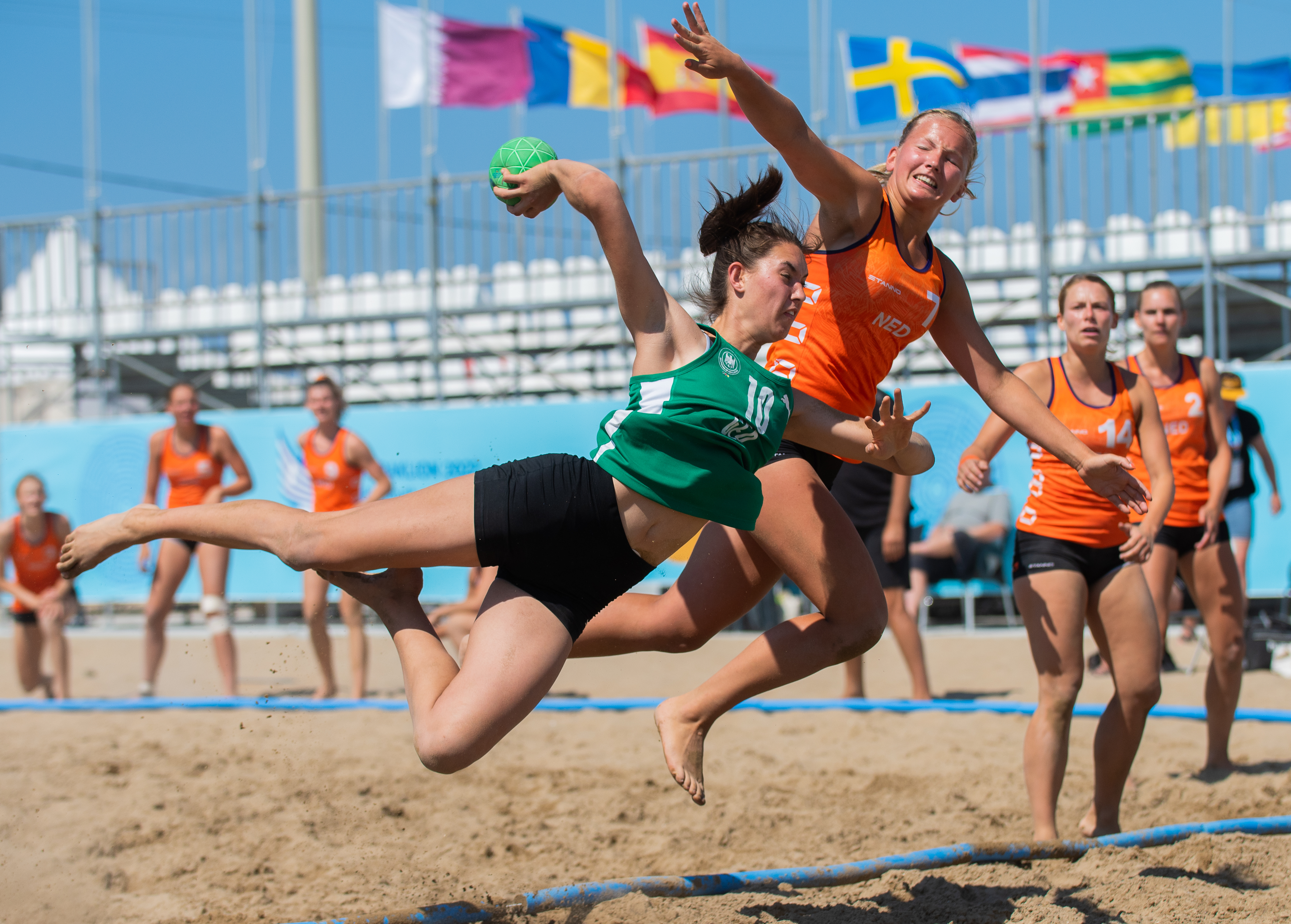
- Germany vs Netherlands women's beach handball test match
- Highest governing body: International Handball Federation

Characteristics
- Contact: No
- Team members: 4 per side
- Mixed-sex: Single and mixed
- Type: Outdoor

Presence
- Country or region: Worldwide
- World Games: 2001

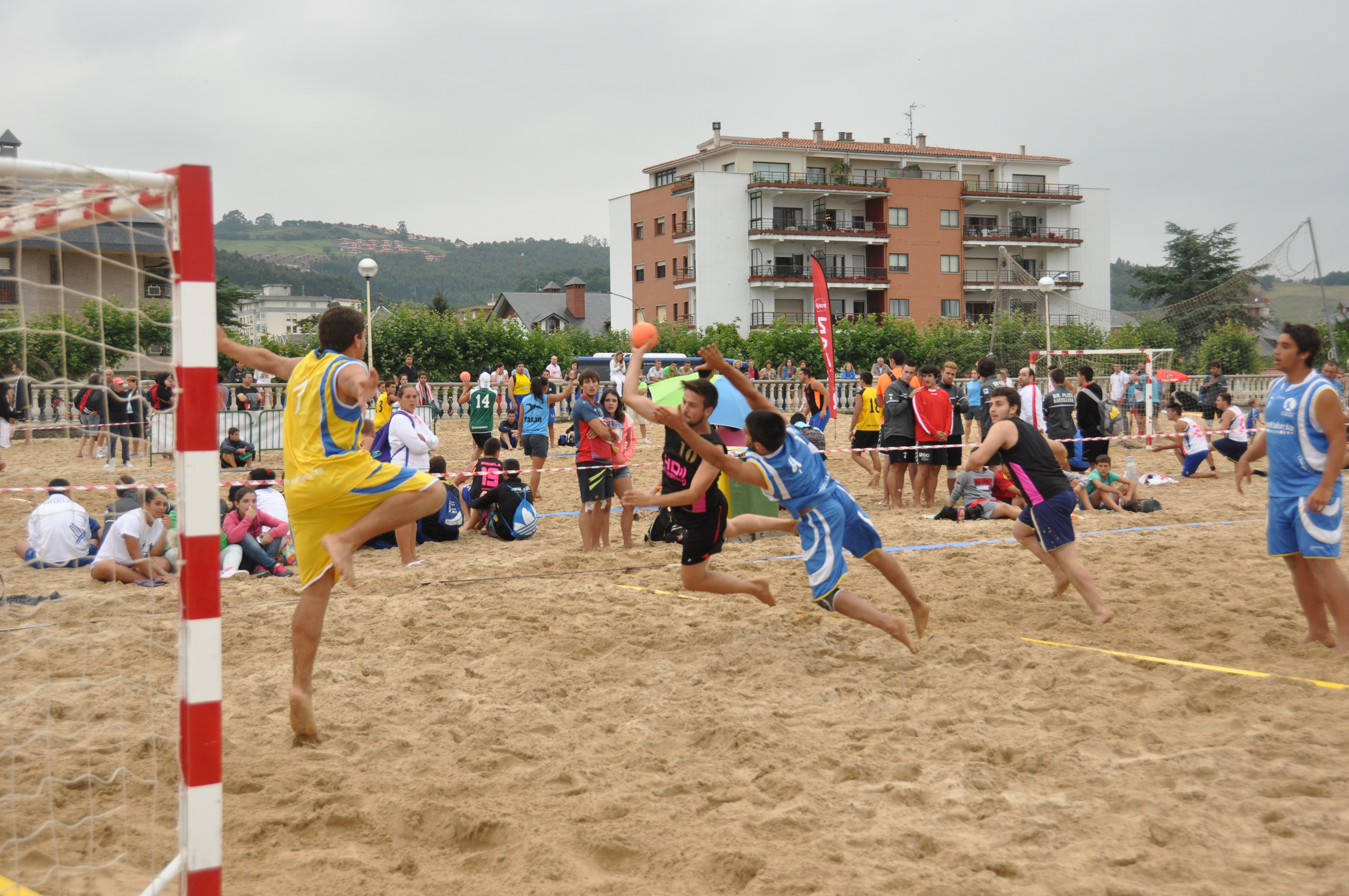
Men dive during a goal attempt in a beach handball game

Symbol of Beach handball

Beach handball is a team sport where two teams pass and bounce or roll a ball, trying to throw it in the goal of the opposing team. The game is similar to standard handball, but it is played on sand instead of on a solid floor. Because the ball loses most of its bounce on sand, there is little to no dribbling, and players instead perform more passing as the rules of travelling still apply.

== History ==
First played in 1990s in Italy, and the 1998 Pan American Beach Handball Championship was first international games.

The first European Championships was played in the year 2000.

As of September 2014, Brazil is ranked the number 1 country in the world, and is the winner of the world championship in both men's and women's divisions at the 2014 Beach Handball World Championships.

== Rules ==
Beach handball field

Matches are played as two 10-minute sets, with a half-time of 5 minutes. If teams are tied at the end of a regular set then the teams play for a golden goal. If the teams are tied at the end of 2 sets then the teams will participate in a tiebreaker. The tie break involves a goalie throwing the ball to their own player while that player attempts to score one-on-one with the opposing goalie. During regular play, if the goalkeeper scores a goal this counts as two points, compared to a normal goal scored by an outfield player which counts as 1 point. Creative or spectacular goals, such as 360-degree jumps and alley-oops, are awarded with two points, as well as in-flights and 6-meter throws.

=== Attire ===
In 2021, the Norway women's national beach handball team was fined €1500 for being improperly dressed after the women wore bike shorts instead of bikini bottoms at a European championship match in Bulgaria. Critics derided the fine and the underlying rule. Although the Norwegian Handball Federation announced they would pay the fines, pop singer Pink offered to pay for them. Later, in November 2021, the International Handball Federation changed their dress rules to allow female players to wear some kinds of shorts, specifying "Female athletes must wear short tight pants with a close fit".

== Injuries ==
Handball in general has a high incidence of injury, with the most common injuries occurring in the lower body (thighs, knees, ankles), and the upper limbs (biceps, shoulders, elbows). There are several risks specific to beach handball that contribute to injury. Violent contact is the primary mechanism of severe injury. This accounts for 71.4% of reported cases in one study. Playing position also is a factor, with central defenders and goalkeepers often showing the highest injury incidence. Age, is in many other sports, is also a contributing factor to injury and accounts for significantly higher overall injury incidence. Participation in beach handball during the off-season for indoor handball is shown to have lower injury incidence during the indoor season.

== Competitions ==
=== World ===
- Beach Handball World Championships
- Beach handball at the World Games
- Beach handball at the World Beach Games
- IHF Youth Beach Handball World Championship
- 2023 IHF Beach Handball Global Tour

=== Regional ===
- Asian Beach Handball Championship
- Beach handball at the Asian Beach Games
- Beach handball at the South American Beach Games
- European Beach Handball Championship (disambiguation)
- European Beach Handball Tour
- Oceania Beach Handball Championship
- Pan American Beach Handball Championship

== See also ==
- Beach volleyball
- Handball
