= 2006 in Brazil =

Events in the year 2006 in Brazil.

== Incumbents ==
=== Federal government ===
- President: Luiz Inácio Lula da Silva
- Vice President: José Alencar Gomes da Silva

=== Governors ===
- Acre: Jorge Viana
- Alagoas:
  - Ronaldo Lessa (until 31 March)
  - Luís Abílio de Sousa Neto (from 31 March)
- Amapa: Waldez Góes
- Amazonas: Eduardo Braga
- Bahia: Paulo Souto
- Ceará: Lúcio Alcântara
- Espírito Santo: Paulo Hartung
- Goiás:
  - Marconi Perillo (until 31 March)
  - Alcides Rodrigues (from 31 March)
- Maranhão: José Reinaldo Tavares
- Mato Grosso: Blairo Maggi
- Mato Grosso do Sul: José Orcírio Miranda dos Santos
- Minas Gerais: Aécio Neves
- Pará: Simão Jatene
- Paraíba: Cássio Cunha Lima
- Paraná: Hermas Eurides Brandão
- Pernambuco:
  - Jarbas Vasconcelos (until 31 March)
  - Mendonça Filho (from 31 March)
- Piauí: Wellington Dias
- Rio de Janeiro: Rosinha Garotinho
- Rio Grande do Norte: Wilma Maria de Faria
- Rio Grande do Sul: Germano Rigotto
- Rondônia: Ivo Narciso Cassol
- Roraima: Ottomar de Sousa Pinto
- Santa Catarina:
  - Luiz Henrique da Silveira (until 9 April)
  - Eduardo Moreira (from 9 April)
- São Paulo:
  - Geraldo Alckmin (until 31 March)
  - Cláudio Lembo (from 31 March)
- Sergipe: João Filho
- Tocantins: Marcelo Miranda

=== Vice governors ===
- Acre: Arnóbio Marques de Almeida Júnior
- Alagoas:
  - Luís Abílio de Sousa Neto (until 31 March)
  - Vacant thereafter
- Amapá: Pedro Paulo Dias de Carvalho
- Amazonas: Omar José Abdel Aziz
- Bahia: Eraldo Tinoco Melo
- Ceará: Francisco de Queiroz Maia Júnior
- Espírito Santo: Wellington Coimbra
- Goiás: Alcides Rodrigues Filho
- Maranhão: Jurandir Ferro do Lago Filho
- Mato Grosso: Iraci Araújo Moreira
- Mato Grosso do Sul: Egon Krakheche
- Minas Gerais: Clésio Soares de Andrade
- Pará: Valéria Pires Franco
- Paraíba: Lauremília Lucena
- Paraná: Orlando Pessuti
- Pernambuco: José Mendonça Bezerra Filho
- Piauí: Osmar Ribeiro de Almeida Júnior
- Rio de Janeiro: Luiz Paulo Conde
- Rio Grande do Norte: Antônio Jácome
- Rio Grande do Sul: Antônio Carlos Hohlfeldt
- Rondônia: Odaísa Fernandes Ferreira
- Roraima: Erci de Moraes
- Santa Catarina:
  - Eduardo Pinho Moreira (until 9 April)
  - Vacant (from 9 April)
- São Paulo:
  - Claudio Lembo (until 31 March)
  - Vacant (from 31 March)
- Sergipe: Marília Mandarino
- Tocantins: Raimundo Nonato Pires dos Santos

== Events ==
=== January ===
- January 28: A 2-month-old baby is found inside a plastic bag at Lagoa da Pampulha, Belo Horizonte.

=== February ===
- February 15: The São Paulo Jury Court annuls the 632-year prison sentence of Colonel Ubiratan Guimarães for the Carandiru Massacre.

=== March ===
- March 30: Aboard the Soyuz TMA-8, Marcos Pontes becomes the first Brazilian and lusophone to go into space and stays at the International Space Station for a week. During his trip, Pontes carried out eight experiments selected by the Brazilian Space Agency. He landed in Kazakhstan on April 8, 2006, with the crew of Expedition 12.

=== April ===
- April 26: Farmer Amair Feijoli da Cunha is sentenced to 18 years in prison for his involvement in the murder of American missionary Dorothy Stang.
- April 26-30: Tenzin Gyatso, the 14th Dalai Lama, makes his third visit to Brazil.

=== May ===
- May 12: A wave of violence in São Paulo begins; as organized by the First Command of the Capital.

=== July ===
- July 20: The airline Varig ceases operations after entering into a judicial recovery process.
- July 22: Suzane von Richthofen and her ex-boyfriend Daniel Cravinhos are sentenced to 39 years and six months in prison for the murder of her parents.

=== August ===
- August 7: President Luiz Inácio Lula da Silva signs the Lei Maria da Penha, which increases the severity of punishments for aggression against women.

=== September ===
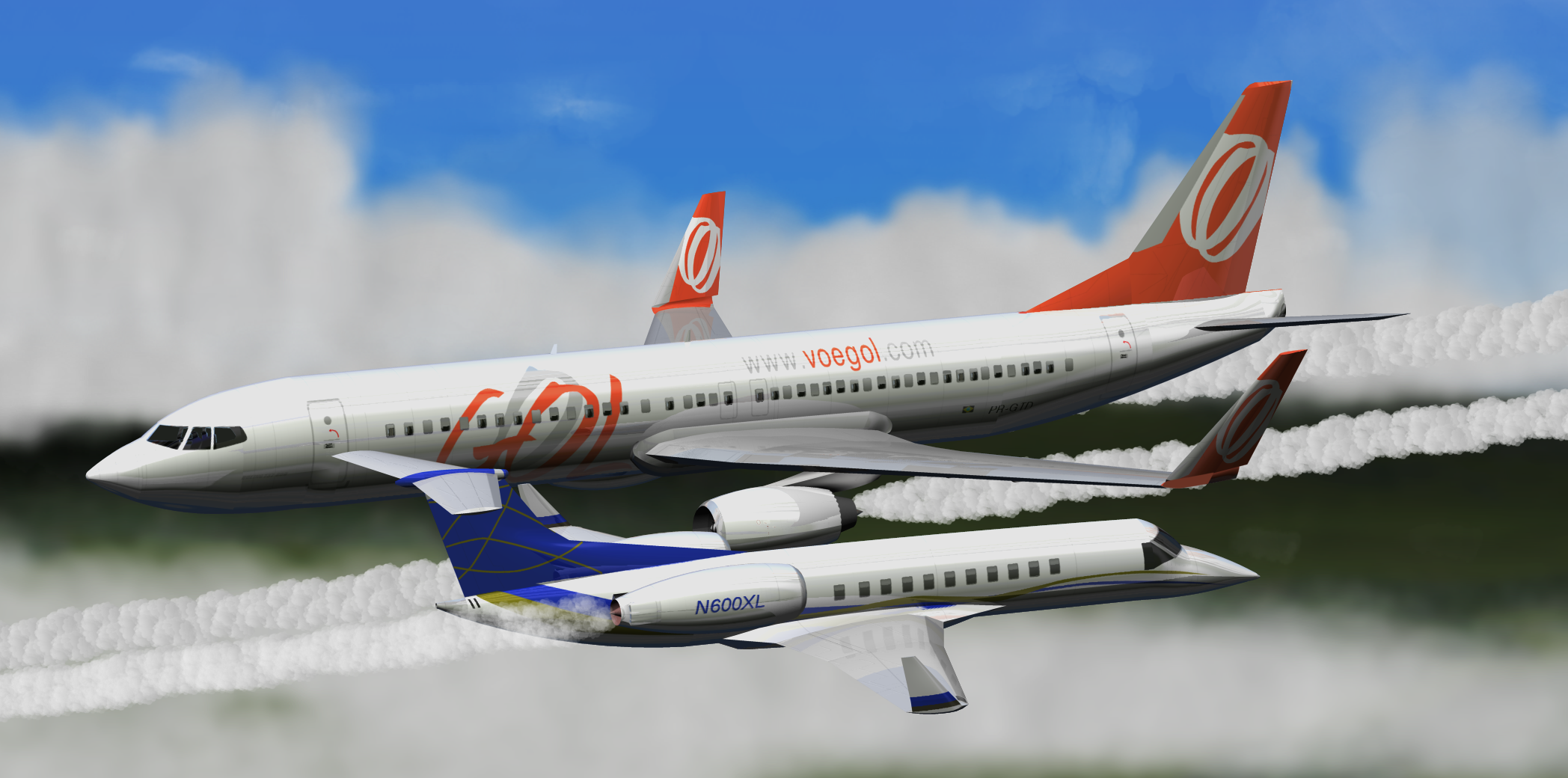
2006 Mato Grosso midair collision

- September 9: Colonel Ubiratan Guimarães, who was accused of ordering the Carandiru Massacre, is found dead in his apartment in the north zone of São Paulo.
- September 29: Gol Transportes Aéreos Flight 1907 crashes in Mato Grosso after being struck mid-air by the wing of an Embraer Legacy jet, killing 155 people on board. This would lead to the 2006–07 Brazilian aviation crisis.

=== October ===
- October 1: The first round of general elections take place. In the presidential race, candidates Luiz Inácio Lula da Silva (PT) and Geraldo Alckmin (PSDB) move on to the second round.
- October 29: Luiz Inácio Lula da Silva is re-elected President of Brazil with more than 58 million votes in the presidential election.

== Elections ==
- Brazilian general election, 2006
- Rio Grande do Sul gubernatorial election, 2006
- São Paulo gubernatorial election, 2006

== Founded ==
- Black House MMA Team.
- Museum of the Portuguese Language
- International Meal Company
- PlayTV

=== Football Clubs ===
- The following 14 clubs were founded in 2006: Adap Galo Maringá Football Club, Arsenal Atividades Desportivas Sport Club, Associação Atlética Carapebus, Coimbra Esporte Clube, Cuiabá Arsenal, Ivinhema Futebol Clube, Sociedade Desportiva Juazeirense, Juventus Futebol Clube, Legião Futebol Clube, Olé Brasil Futebol Clube, Primavera Esporte Clube, Rondonópolis Esporte Clube, Associação Esportiva Real, and Sampaio Corrêa Futebol e Esporte

== Film ==
- List of Brazilian films of 2006

== Television ==
=== Debuted ===
- Cobras & Lagartos
- Floribella
- Ídolos
- O Profeta
- Páginas da Vida
- Pé na Jaca
- Topa ou Não Topa
- Vidas Opostas

=== Ended ===
- Alma Gêmea
- Belíssima
- Cobras & Lagartos
- Pé na Jaca

== Music ==
- Yahoo reunite.
- The bands Os Mutantes, Orkestra Rumpilezz, Thyresis, Almah and Rivotrill are formed.

== Sport ==
- 2006 in Brazilian football.
- 2006 Grand Prix de Futsal.
- 2006 CONMEBOL Beach Soccer Championship.
- 2006 FIFA Beach Soccer World Cup.
- 2006 Brazilian Grand Prix.
- 2006 Desafio Internacional das Estrelas.
- 2006 Brasil Open.
- 2006 Copa América de Ciclismo.
- Brazil win the 2006 South American Rugby Championship "B".
- Brazil participate in the 2006 FIBA World Championship for Women.
- 2006 FINA Youth World Swimming Championships in Rio de Janeiro.
- 2006 Pan American Men's Youth Handball Championship.
- 2006 Beach Handball World Championships.
- Brazil at the 2006 Winter Olympics.
- Brazil at the 2006 Lusophony Games.

== Births ==
=== July ===
- July 21: Endrick, professional footballer
- August 21: João Fonseca, tennis player

== Deaths ==
=== January ===
- January 7: Urano Teixeira da Matta Bacellar, soldier and head of the UN peacekeeping force in Haiti (b. 1947)

=== February ===
- February 1: Carlson Gracie, martial artist (b. 1932)

=== March ===
- March 18: Nelson Dantas, actor (b. 1927)
- March 28: Wanderley Magalhães Azevedo, cyclist (b. 1966)

=== April ===
- April 5: Carequinha, clown and actor (b. 1915)

=== June ===
- June 17: Bussunda, comedian (b. 1962)

=== September ===
- September 9: Ubiratan Guimarães, colonel in the São Paulo military police involved in the Carandiru massacre (b. 1943)

=== November ===
- November 15: Ana Carolina Reston, fashion model (b. 1985)

=== December ===
- December 24: Braguinha, composer (b. 1907)

== See also ==
- 2006 in Brazilian football
