= Mexico at the 2022 Central American and Caribbean Beach Games =

- IOC code: MEX
- NOC: Mexican Olympic Committee

in Santa Marta, Colombia November 19 – 26, 2022
- Competitors: 70 (42 men and 28 women) in 9 sports and 36 events
- Flag bearers: Elena Oetling (opening) & Martha Sandoval (closing)
- Coaches: 10
- Officials: 18
- Medals Ranked 4th: Gold 5 Silver 6 Bronze 10 Total 21

Central American and Caribbean Beach Games appearances
- 2022

Mexico competed in the 2022 Central American and Caribbean Beach Games in Santa Marta, Colombia from November 19 to 26, 2022.

On November 15, 2022, sailor Elena Oetling was named as the country's flag bearer during the opening ceremony.

== Medalists ==
The following Mexican athletes won medals at the games.

| Medal | Name | Sport | Event | Date |
|---|---|---|---|---|
| Gold | Elena Oetling | Sailing | Women's ILca 6 | November 23 |
| Gold | Women's Beach Handball Team | Beach Handball | Women's tournament | November 23 |
| Gold | Martha Sandoval | Open Water Swimming | Women's 3000 metres | November 24 |
| Gold | Paulina Alaníz; Martha Sandoval; Daniel Delgadillo; Arturo Pérez | Open Water Swimming | Mixed team relay 4X1000 metres | November 25 |
| Gold | Martha Sandoval | Open Water Swimming | Women's 5000 metres | November 26 |
| Silver | Ambar Garnica | Beach Wrestling | Women's -70 Kg | November 21 |
| Silver | Bernardo Cárdenas | Beach Wrestling | Men's -70 Kg | November 21 |
| Silver | Olivia Ramírez | Surf | Women's Bodyboard | November 21 |
| Silver | Aída Ramos | Surf | Women's Sup Surf | November 21 |
| Silver | Paulina Alanis | Open Water Swimming | Women's 3000 metres | November 24 |
| Silver | Paulina Alanis | Open Water Swimming | Women's 5000 metres | November 26 |
| Bronze | Brenda Fernández | Beach Wrestling | Women's -60 Kg | November 21 |
| Bronze | Bernardo Cárdenas | Beach Wrestling | Men's -80 Kg | November 21 |
| Bronze | Héctor González | Surf | Men's Sup Surf | November 23 |
| Bronze | Mariana Guzmán) | Sailing | Women's ILca 6 | November 23 |
| Bronze | Jessica Cortés; Valentina Le Bergere | Beach Tennis | Women's doubles | November 23 |
| Gold | Men's Beach Soccer Team | Beach Football | Men's tournament | November 26 |
| Bronze | Daniel Delgadillo | Open Water Swimming | Men's 5000 metres | November 26 |
| Bronze | Antonio Vázquez | Skateboarding | Men's Street | November 26 |
| Bronze | Alexis Galicia; Oziel Aguirre | Beach Volleyball | Men's tournament | November 26 |
| Bronze | Abril Flores; Katherine Albarrán | Beach Volleyball | Women's tournament | November 26 |

Medals by sport
| Sport | 1st place, gold medalist(s) | 2nd place, silver medalist(s) | 3rd place, bronze medalist(s) | Total |
| Open Water | 3 | 2 | 1 | 6 |
| Sailing | 1 | 0 | 1 | 2 |
| Beach Handball | 1 | 0 | 0 | 1 |
| Beach Wrestling | 0 | 2 | 2 | 4 |
| Surf | 0 | 2 | 1 | 3 |
| Beach Volleyball | 0 | 0 | 2 | 2 |
| Beach Tennis | 0 | 0 | 1 | 1 |
| Beach Football | 0 | 0 | 1 | 1 |
| Skateboarding | 0 | 0 | 1 | 1 |
| Total | 5 | 6 | 10 | 21 |

Medals by day
| Day | 1st place, gold medalist(s) | 2nd place, silver medalist(s) | 3rd place, bronze medalist(s) | Total |
| November 21 | 0 | 4 | 2 | 6 |
| November 23 | 2 | 0 | 2 | 4 |
| November 24 | 1 | 1 | 1 | 3 |
| November 25 | 1 | 0 | 0 | 1 |
| November 26 | 1 | 1 | 5 | 7 |
| Total | 5 | 6 | 10 | 21 |

Medals by gender
| Gender | 1st place, gold medalist(s) | 2nd place, silver medalist(s) | 3rd place, bronze medalist(s) | Total |
| Male | 0 | 1 | 6 | 7 |
| Female | 4 | 5 | 4 | 13 |
| Mixed | 1 | 0 | 0 | 1 |
| Total | 5 | 6 | 10 | 21 |

Multiple medalists
| Name | Sport | 1st place, gold medalist(s) | 2nd place, silver medalist(s) | 3rd place, bronze medalist(s) | Total |
| Martha Sandoval | Open Water | 3 | 0 | 0 | 3 |
| Paulina Alanis | Open Water | 1 | 2 | 0 | 3 |
| Daniel Delgadillo | Open Water | 1 | 0 | 1 | 2 |

== Competitors ==
The following is the list of number of competitors (per gender) participating at the games per sport/discipline.

| Sport | Men | Women | Total |
|---|---|---|---|
| Beach Handball | 10 | 10 | 20 |
| Beach Soccer | 12 | —N/a | 12 |
| Beach Tennis | 2 | 2 | 4 |
| Beach Volleyball | 2 | 2 | 4 |
| Beach Wrestling | 4 | 4 | 8 |
| Open Water Swimming | 2 | 2 | 4 |
| Sailing | 4 | 2 | 6 |
| Skateboarding | 2 | 2 | 4 |
| Surf | 4 | 4 | 8 |
| Total | 42 | 28 | 70 |

== Beach Handball ==
=== Men's ===
Summary

| Team | Event | Round Robin | | | | | | Semifinal | Final / BM | |
| Team | Event | Opposition Result | Opposition Result | Opposition Result | Opposition Result | Opposition Result | Rank | Opposition Result | Opposition Result | Rank |
|---|---|---|---|---|---|---|---|---|---|---|
| Mexico | Men's tournament | Venezuela; W 2 – 1 | Puerto Rico; W 2 – 0 | Trinidad and Tobago; W 2 – 1 | Colombia; W 2 – 0 | Dominican Republic; W 2 – 0 | 1 | Colombia; L 0 – 2 | Trinidad and Tobago; L 0 – 2 | 4 |

Squad

Mexico men's national beach handball team
| No. | Athlete | No. | Athlete |
|---|---|---|---|
| 1 | Edgar Yahuaca | 3 | Juan Pablo Martínez |
| 5 | Luis Telles | 6 | Juan Carlos Mayoral |
| 11 | Manuel Chávez | 14 | Sayyed Morales |
| 21 | Manuel Rivas | 22 | José Miguel Pérez |
| 24 | Iván Rangel | 27 | Miguel Aguilar |

Round Robin

| Pos | Team | Pld | W | L | Pts | SW | SL | SR | SPW | SPL | SPR | Qualification |
|---|---|---|---|---|---|---|---|---|---|---|---|---|
| 1 | Mexico | 5 | 5 | 0 | 10 | 10 | 2 | 5.000 | 221 | 177 | 1.249 | Semifinals |
| 2 | Venezuela | 5 | 4 | 1 | 8 | 9 | 3 | 3.000 | 204 | 173 | 1.179 | Semifinals |
| 3 | Trinidad and Tobago | 5 | 2 | 3 | 4 | 6 | 6 | 1.000 | 190 | 183 | 1.038 | Semifinals |
| 4 | Colombia (H) | 5 | 2 | 3 | 4 | 5 | 7 | 0.714 | 183 | 184 | 0.995 | Semifinals |
| 5 | Dominican Republic | 5 | 2 | 3 | 4 | 4 | 7 | 0.571 | 161 | 191 | 0.843 | Consolation round |
| 6 | Puerto Rico | 5 | 0 | 5 | 0 | 1 | 10 | 0.100 | 165 | 216 | 0.764 | Consolation round |

Source: IHF
Rules for classification: 1) Points; 2) Head-to-head points; 3) Head-to-head set difference; 4) Head-to-head points won; 5) Set difference; 6) Points won; 7) Draw.
(H) Host

Round Robin

| 20 November 2022; 8:45 | Mexico | 2–1 | Venezuela | Cancha Balonmano - Parque Multideportivo El Rodadero; Attendance: 50; Referees: Camilo Salamanca (COL), Hector Orjuela (COL) |
| 20 November 2022; 8:45 | (12–25, 23–20, 8–4); Report | | | Cancha Balonmano - Parque Multideportivo El Rodadero; Attendance: 50; Referees: Camilo Salamanca (COL), Hector Orjuela (COL) |

| 20 November 2022; 11:45 | Puerto Rico | 0–2 | Mexico | Cancha Balonmano - Parque Multideportivo El Rodadero; Attendance: 50; Referees: Hector Orjuela (COL), Camilo Salamanca (COL) |
| 20 November 2022; 11:45 | (18–30, 16–21); Report | | | Cancha Balonmano - Parque Multideportivo El Rodadero; Attendance: 50; Referees: Hector Orjuela (COL), Camilo Salamanca (COL) |

| 21 November 2022; 8:00 | Trinidad and Tobago | 1–2 | Mexico | Cancha Balonmano - Parque Multideportivo El Rodadero; Attendance: 50; Referees: Pedro Ortega (VEN), Miguel Aular (VEN) |
| 21 November 2022; 8:00 | (15–17, 21–20, 4–9); Report | | | Cancha Balonmano - Parque Multideportivo El Rodadero; Attendance: 50; Referees: Pedro Ortega (VEN), Miguel Aular (VEN) |

| 21 November 2022; 11:00 | Mexico | 2–0 | Colombia | Cancha Balonmano - Parque Multideportivo El Rodadero; Attendance: 80; Referees: Pedro Ortega (VEN), Miguel Aular (VEN) |
| 21 November 2022; 11:00 | (18–14, 18–12); Report | | | Cancha Balonmano - Parque Multideportivo El Rodadero; Attendance: 80; Referees: Pedro Ortega (VEN), Miguel Aular (VEN) |

| 22 November 2022; 11:00 | Mexico | 1–2 | Dominican Republic | Cancha Balonmano - Parque Multideportivo El Rodadero; Attendance: 50; Referees: Kitsa Escobar (PUR), Nathalys Ceballos (PUR) |
| 22 November 2022; 11:00 | (19–12, 26–16); Report | | | Cancha Balonmano - Parque Multideportivo El Rodadero; Attendance: 50; Referees: Kitsa Escobar (PUR), Nathalys Ceballos (PUR) |

Semifinal

| 23 November 2022; 11:15 | Mexico | 0–2 | Colombia | Cancha Balonmano - Parque Multideportivo El Rodadero; Attendance: 50; Referees: Kitsa Escobar (PUR), Nathalys Ceballos (PUR) |
| 23 November 2022; 11:15 | (14–17, 13–16); Report | | | Cancha Balonmano - Parque Multideportivo El Rodadero; Attendance: 50; Referees: Kitsa Escobar (PUR), Nathalys Ceballos (PUR) |

Bronze Medal Match

| 23 November 2022; 15:00 | Trinidad and Tobago | 2–0 | Mexico | Cancha Balonmano - Parque Multideportivo El Rodadero; Attendance: 60; Referees: Kitsa Escobar (PUR), Nathalys Ceballos (PUR) |
| 23 November 2022; 15:00 | (17–16, 15–14); Report | | | Cancha Balonmano - Parque Multideportivo El Rodadero; Attendance: 60; Referees: Kitsa Escobar (PUR), Nathalys Ceballos (PUR) |

=== Women's ===
Summary

| Team | Event | Round Robin | | | | | | Semifinal | Final / BM | |
| Team | Event | Opposition Result | Opposition Result | Opposition Result | Opposition Result | Opposition Result | Rank | Opposition Result | Opposition Result | Rank |
|---|---|---|---|---|---|---|---|---|---|---|
| Mexico | Women's tournament | Venezuela; W 2 – 0 | Dominican Republic; W 2 – 0 | (Martinique) Martinique; W 2 – 0 | Colombia; W 2 – 0 | Puerto Rico; L 1 – 2 | 1 | Dominican Republic; W 2 – 1 | Venezuela; W 2 – 0 | Gold medal |

Squad

Mexico women's national beach handball team
| No. | Athlete | No. | Athlete |
|---|---|---|---|
| 1 | Aida Zamora | 9 | Lucía Berra |
| 5 | Teocalli Hernández | 11 | Martha Mejía |
| 6 | Claudia Macías | 12 | Edna Uresty |
| 7 | Gabriela Salazar | 14 | Andrea De León |
| 8 | Itzel Vargas | 15 | Adela Valenzuela |

Round Robin

| Pos | Team | Pld | W | L | Pts | SW | SL | SR | SPW | SPL | SPR | Qualification |
|---|---|---|---|---|---|---|---|---|---|---|---|---|
| 1 | Mexico | 5 | 4 | 1 | 8 | 9 | 2 | 4.500 | 225 | 156 | 1.442 | Semifinals |
| 2 | Colombia (H) | 5 | 4 | 1 | 8 | 8 | 2 | 4.000 | 193 | 157 | 1.229 | Semifinals |
| 3 | Venezuela | 5 | 3 | 2 | 6 | 6 | 5 | 1.200 | 154 | 164 | 0.939 | Semifinals |
| 4 | Dominican Republic | 5 | 2 | 3 | 4 | 5 | 6 | 0.833 | 171 | 174 | 0.983 | Semifinals |
| 5 | Puerto Rico | 5 | 2 | 3 | 4 | 4 | 7 | 0.571 | 170 | 196 | 0.867 | Consolation round |
| 6 | Martinique | 5 | 0 | 5 | 0 | 0 | 10 | 0.000 | 147 | 213 | 0.690 | Consolation round |

Source: IHF
Rules for classification: 1) Points; 2) Head-to-head points; 3) Head-to-head set difference; 4) Head-to-head points won; 5) Set difference; 6) Points won; 7) Draw.
(H) Host

Round Robin

| 20 November 2022; 8:00 | Mexico | 2–0 | Venezuela | Cancha Balonmano - Parque Multideportivo El Rodadero; Attendance: 50; Referees: Kitsa Escobar (PUR), Nathalys Ceballos (PUR) |
| 20 November 2022; 8:00 | (19–18, 20–10); Report | | | Cancha Balonmano - Parque Multideportivo El Rodadero; Attendance: 50; Referees: Kitsa Escobar (PUR), Nathalys Ceballos (PUR) |

| 20 November 2022; 10:15 | Dominican Republic | 0–2 | Mexico | Cancha Balonmano - Parque Multideportivo El Rodadero; Attendance: 50; Referees: Pedro Ortega (VEN), Miguel Aular (VEN) |
| 20 November 2022; 10:15 | (16–23, 21–23); Report | | | Cancha Balonmano - Parque Multideportivo El Rodadero; Attendance: 50; Referees: Pedro Ortega (VEN), Miguel Aular (VEN) |

| 21 November 2022; 8:45 | Martinique | 0–2 | Mexico | Cancha Balonmano - Parque Multideportivo El Rodadero; Attendance: 50; Referees: Kitsa Escobar (PUR), Nathalys Ceballos (PUR) |
| 21 November 2022; 8:45 | (11–23, 13–25); Report | | | Cancha Balonmano - Parque Multideportivo El Rodadero; Attendance: 50; Referees: Kitsa Escobar (PUR), Nathalys Ceballos (PUR) |

| 21 November 2022; 11:45 | Mexico | 2–0 | Colombia | Cancha Balonmano - Parque Multideportivo El Rodadero; Attendance: 80; Referees: Pedro Ortega (VEN), Miguel Aular (VEN) |
| 21 November 2022; 11:45 | (25–12, 21–18); Report | | | Cancha Balonmano - Parque Multideportivo El Rodadero; Attendance: 80; Referees: Pedro Ortega (VEN), Miguel Aular (VEN) |

| 22 November 2022; 9:30 | Mexico | 1–2 | Puerto Rico | Cancha Balonmano - Parque Multideportivo El Rodadero; Attendance: 80; Referees: Pedro Ortega (VEN), Miguel Aular (VEN) |
| 22 November 2022; 9:30 | (15–18, 29–16, 2–3); Report | | | Cancha Balonmano - Parque Multideportivo El Rodadero; Attendance: 80; Referees: Pedro Ortega (VEN), Miguel Aular (VEN) |

Semifinal

| 23 November 2022; 9:00 | Mexico | 2–1 | Dominican Republic | Cancha Balonmano - Parque Multideportivo El Rodadero; Attendance: 80; Referees: Pedro Ortega (VEN), Miguel Aular (VEN) |
| 23 November 2022; 9:00 | (18–21, 22–13, 5–4); Report | | | Cancha Balonmano - Parque Multideportivo El Rodadero; Attendance: 80; Referees: Pedro Ortega (VEN), Miguel Aular (VEN) |

Gold Medal Match

| 23 November 2022; 15:45 | Mexico | 2–0 | Venezuela | Cancha Balonmano - Parque Multideportivo El Rodadero; Attendance: 200; Referees: Kitsa Escobar (PUR), Nathalys Ceballos (PUR) |
| 23 November 2022; 15:45 | (24–14, 22–16); Report | | | Cancha Balonmano - Parque Multideportivo El Rodadero; Attendance: 200; Referees: Kitsa Escobar (PUR), Nathalys Ceballos (PUR) |

== Beach Football ==
=== Men's ===
Summary

| Team | Event | Round Robin | | | | | Final / BM | |
| Team | Event | Opposition Result | Opposition Result | Opposition Result | Opposition Result | Rank | Opposition Result | Rank |
|---|---|---|---|---|---|---|---|---|
| Mexico | Men's tournament | Venezuela; L 2 – 3 | El Salvador; L 3(5) – 3(6) | Bahamas; L 1 – 2 | Colombia; W 5 – 4 | 4 | Bahamas; W 7 – 2 | Bronze medal |

Squad

Note: Flags indicate national team as defined under FIFA eligibility rules; some limited exceptions apply. Players may hold more than one non-FIFA nationality.

| No. | Pos. | Nation | Player |
|---|---|---|---|
| 1 | GK | MEX | Gabriel Macías |
| 2 | DF | MEX | Juan Carlos Morales |
| 3 | DF | MEX | Salomón Wbias |
| 4 | MF | MEX | Edgar Portilla |
| 5 | MF | MEX | Héctor Acevedo |
| 6 | FW | MEX | Victor Trueba |

| No. | Pos. | Nation | Player |
|---|---|---|---|
| 7 | FW | MEX | Jacob Montes de Oca |
| 8 | MF | MEX | Diego Martínez |
| 9 | FW | MEX | Alexis Márquez |
| 10 | MF | MEX | Fausto Alemán |
| 11 | FW | MEX | David Vizcarra |
| 12 | GK | MEX | Antonio Echeverría |

Round Robin

| Pos | Team | Pld | W | OTW | OTL | L | GF | GA | GD | Pts | Qualification |
|---|---|---|---|---|---|---|---|---|---|---|---|
| 1 | El Salvador | 4 | 3 | 1 | 0 | 0 | 15 | 8 | +7 | 11 | Gold Medal Match |
| 2 | Venezuela | 4 | 2 | 0 | 0 | 2 | 9 | 12 | −3 | 6 | Gold Medal Match |
| 3 | Bahamas | 4 | 2 | 0 | 0 | 2 | 9 | 12 | −3 | 6 | Bronze Medal Match |
| 4 | Mexico | 4 | 1 | 0 | 1 | 2 | 11 | 12 | −1 | 4 | Bronze Medal Match |
| 5 | Colombia | 4 | 1 | 0 | 0 | 3 | 14 | 14 | 0 | 3 | |

Source: IHF
Rules for classification: 1) Points; 2) Head-to-head points; 3) Head-to-head set difference; 4) Head-to-head points won; 5) Set difference; 6) Points won; 7) Draw.

Round Robin

20 November 2022
14:30

| Mexico | 2–3 | Venezuela |
|---|---|---|
| Wbias 19' | Report | Narea 3'; García 3'; Muñóz 24' |

Estadio Futbol Playa - Parque Multideportivo El Rodadero
Referee: David Cruz (El Salvador)

21 November 2022
14:30

| El Salvador | 3–3 (a.e.t.) | Mexico |
|---|---|---|
| Urbina 27'; Cruz 29'; Ramos 36' | Report | Martínez 13'; Portilla 23'; Trueba 36' |
Penalties
| Ramos (penalty scored); González (penalty scored); Cruz (penalty scored); Perdomo (penalty scored); Ramírez (penalty scored); Ruíz (penalty missed); Ayala (penalty scored) | 6–5 | (penalty scored) Alemán; (penalty scored) Portilla; (penalty scored) Martínez; (penalty scored) Acevedo; (penalty scored) Trueba; (penalty missed) Montes De Oca; (penalty missed) Vizcarra |

Estadio Futbol Playa - Parque Multideportivo El Rodadero
Referee: Jorge Tuñon (Panama)

22 November 2022
14:30

| Mexico | 1–2 | Bahamas |
|---|---|---|
| Vizcarra 12' | Report | St Fleur 28'; Jaime 29' |

Estadio Futbol Playa - Parque Multideportivo El Rodadero
Referee: Jorge Gómez (Colombia)

23 November 2022
16:00

| Colombia | 4–5 | Mexico |
|---|---|---|
| Macías 0'; Acevedo 5', 12'; Márquez 13'; Vizcarra 31' | Report | Hernández 1', 16'; Morales 6', 20' |

Estadio Futbol Playa - Parque Multideportivo El Rodadero
Referee: Jonathan Hernández (Costa Rica)

Bronze Medal Match

26 November 2022
14:30

| Bahamas | 2–7 | Mexico |
|---|---|---|
| Julmis 12', 23' | Report | Portilla 17', 25'; Márquez 18', 30'; Trueba 24', 27'; Montes De Oca 35' |

Estadio Futbol Playa - Parque Multideportivo El Rodadero
Referee: David Cruz (El Salvador)

== Beach Tennis ==
| Athlete | Event | Quarterfinal | Semifinal | Final / BM | |
| Athlete | Event | Opposition Score | Opposition Score | Opposition Score | Rank |
|---|---|---|---|---|---|
| Gabriel De La O Jonatan Baños | Men's doubles | (Guadeloupe); Yohann / Gérard; L 4–6, 3–6 | Did not advance | | 5 |
| Jessica Cortes; Valentina La Bergere | Women's doubles | (Guadeloupe); Calonne / Fanny W 6–4, 6–1 | Colavita / Roncal (VEN); L 1–6, 2–6 | Brenes / Miño (VEN); W 7–6, 6–4 | Bronze medal |
| Valentina La Bergere; Jonatan Baños | Mixed doubles | Mercedes / Rodriguez (PUR); L 1–6, 0–6 | Did not advance | | 5 |

== Beach Volleyball ==
| Athlete | Event | Pool play | | | | Round of 16 | Quarterfinal | Semifinal | Final / BM | |
| Athlete | Event | Opposition Score | Opposition Score | Opposition Score | Rank | Opposition Score | Opposition Score | Opposition Score | Opposition Score | Rank |
|---|---|---|---|---|---|---|---|---|---|---|
| Alexis Galicia; Oziel Aguirre | Men's tournament | Alayo/Diaz (CUB); L 0 – 2 (19-21), (15-21) | Jn Pierre/Victor (LCA); W 2 – 0 (21-13), (21-7) | Ward/Richards (SKN); W 2 – 0 (21-6), (21-11) | 2 | Fallas/Fernandez (CRC); W 2 – 0 (21-15), (21-12) | De Jesus/Martinez (DOM); W 2 – 1 (21-13), (18-21), (16-14) | Noriega/De La Hoz (COL); L 0 – 2 (16-21), (19-21) | Guardado/Guardado (ESA); W 2 – 0 (25-23), (21-19) | Bronze medal |
| Abril Flores; Katherine Albarran | Women's tournament | Rosales/Silva (NCA); W 2 – 0 (21-14), (21-12) | Gaetos/Tulloch (CAY); W 2 – 0 (21-6), (21-4) | Evans/Phillip (LCA); W 2 – 0 (21-13), (21-7) | 1 | Bye | Araya/Nuñez (CRC); W 2 – 0 (21-15), (21-12) | Navas/Gonzalez (PUR); L 0 – 2 (19-21), (11-21) | Linares/Camacho (VEN); W 2 – 0 (21-8), (21-15) | Bronze medal |

== Beach Wrestling ==
| Athlete | Event | Pool play | | | | | Semifinal | Final / BM | |
| Athlete | Event | Opposition Score | Opposition Score | Opposition Score | Opposition Score | Rank | Opposition Score | Opposition Score | Rank |
|---|---|---|---|---|---|---|---|---|---|
| Bernardo Cárdenas | Men's -70 Kg | | | Tull (BAR); W 3 – 0 | Cornelis (SUR); W 3 – 1 | 1 | Moreno (PUR); W 3 – 1 | Montero (VEN); L 1 – 3 | Silver medal |
| Daniel Vicente | Men's -80 Kg | | Maynard (BAR); W 2 – 0 | Martinez (PUR); W 1(1) – (0) 1 | Sherwin (SUR); W 3 – 1 | 1 | Cortés (PAN); L 0 – 3 | Sherwin (SUR); W 3 – 0 | Bronze medal |
| Rommel Murillo | Men's -90 Kg | | | Angulo (COL); L 0 – 3 | Ceballos (VEN); L 0 – 3 | 3 | Did not advance | | 6 |
| Eduardo García | Men's +90 Kg | | | Sevillano (COL); W 4 – 0 | Diaz (VEN); L 0 – 3 | 4 | Darius (PUR); L 0 – 1 | Aparicio (PAN); L 0 – 2 | 4 |
| Rita Rojas | Women's -50 Kg | Lozada (PUR); L 0(0) – (5)0 | Franco (COL); L 0 – 1 | Morán (PAN); L 0(0) – (5)0 | Gutierrez (VEN); L DNS | 5 | | | 5 |
| Brenda Isay | Women's -60 Kg | Arguello (VEN); L 0 – 3 | Manoleskos (PAN); W 3 – 0 | Jaime (PUR); W 4 – 0 | Chaparro (COL); L 1(0) – (1)1 | 3 | | | Bronze medal |
| Ámbar Garnica | Women's -70 Kg | Grima (VEN); L 0 – 4 | Santiago (PUR); W 2 – 0 | Ceballos (COL); W 1 – 0 | Poveda (PAN); W 4 – 0 | 2 | | | Silver medal |
| Luz María Hernández | Women's +70 Kg | | | Sánchez (PAN); L 0 – 3 | Rentería (COL); L 0(0) – (2)0 | 5 | Did not advance | | 5 |

== Open Water Swimming ==
| Athlete | Event | Final | |
| Athlete | Event | Time | Rank |
|---|---|---|---|
| Arturo Pérez | Men's 3000 m | 35:23.79 | 5 |
| Daniel Delgadillo | Men's 3000 m | DNF | |
| Daniel Delgadillo | Men's 5000 m | 1h 05:01.48 | Bronze medal |
| Arturo Pérez | Men's 5000 m | 1h 07:09.09 | 7 |
| Paulina Alanis | Women's 3000 m | 38:06.90 | Silver medal |
| Martha Sandoval | Women's 3000 m | 37:28.84 | Gold medal |
| Martha Sandoval | Women's 5000 m | 1h 08:29.86 | Gold medal |
| Paulina Alanis | Women's 5000 m | 1h 10:08.97 | Silver medal |
| Daniel Delgadillo; Arturo Pérez; Martha Sandoval; Paulina Alanis | 4 X 1000 m Mixed Relay | 52:23.59 | Gold medal |

== Sailing ==
| Athlete | Event | Race | | | | | | | | | | Total | |
| Athlete | Event | 1 | 2 | 3 | 4 | 5 | 6 | 7 | 8 | 9 | 10 | Points | Rank |
|---|---|---|---|---|---|---|---|---|---|---|---|---|---|
| Gerardo Benítez | Men's ILca 7 | 3 | 3 | 6 | 4 | 4 | 6 | (9) | | | | 26 | 5 |
| Daniel Villegas | Men's Kite Surf Race | (7 DNS) | 4 | 3 | (7 DNF) | 7 | 2 | 2 | 2 | 2 | 2 | 24 | 4 |
| Michelle Mejía | Men's Sunfish | 8 | 8 | 8 | (9 DNF) | 9 | 5 | 7 | | | | 45 | 9 |
| Cristóbal Hagermann | Men's IQFoil | 4 | 3 | 3 | 2 | 5 | (9 RET) | 5 | | | | 22 | 4 |
| Elena Oetling | Women's ILca 6 | (2) | 1 | 1 | 1 | 1 | 2 | 2 | | | | 8 | Gold medal |
| Mariana Guzmán | Women's ILca 6 | (5) | 3 | 3 | 3 | 3 | 4 | 3 | | | | 19 | Bronze medal |

== Skateboarding ==
| Athlete | Event | Qualification | | | | | | | | | Final | | | | | | | | |
| Athlete | Event | Runs | | Tricks | | | | | Total points | Final rank | Runs | | Tricks | | | | | Total points | Final rank |
| Athlete | Event | 1 | 2 | 1 | 2 | 3 | 4 | 5 | Total points | Final rank | 1 | 2 | 1 | 2 | 3 | 4 | 5 | Total points | Final rank |
|---|---|---|---|---|---|---|---|---|---|---|---|---|---|---|---|---|---|---|---|
| Brayan Coria | Men's Street | 49.50 | 58.50 | 64.43 | 3.50 | 0.00 | 54.00 | 0.00 | 176.93 | 2 Q | 52.67 | 45.93 | 53.03 | 51.57 | 54.47 | 0.00 | 0.00 | 160.17 | Bronze medal |
| Nelson Garza | Men's Street | 57.97 | 63.97 | 55.63 | 48.63 | 34.60 | 62.27 | 63.13 | 189.37 | 2 Q | 54.87 | 44.43 | 0.00 | 0.00 | 52.30 | 49.67 | 0.00 | 156.84 | 4 |
| Itzel Granados | Women's Street | 38.97 | 31.57 | 0.00 | 20.67 | 0.00 | 33.73 | 0.00 | 97.70 | 2 Q | 28.30 | 31.37 | 0.00 | 27.60 | 0.00 | 0.00 | 0.00 | 58.97 | 6 |
| Jennifer Muñóz | Women's Street | 26.63 | 29.33 | 0.00 | 20.67 | 0.00 | 17.46 | 0.00 | 69.47 | 4 Q | 29.67 | 22.00 | 21.17 | 25.40 | 0.00 | 0.00 | 0.00 | 76.24 | 5 |

== Surf ==
| Athlete | Event | Round 1 | | Repechage Round 1 | | Round 2 | | Repechage Round 2 | | Repechage Round 3 | | Repechage Round 4 | | Final | |
| Athlete | Event | Score | Rank | Score | Rank | Score | Rank | Score | Rank | Score | Rank | Score | Rank | Score | Rank |
|---|---|---|---|---|---|---|---|---|---|---|---|---|---|---|---|
| Alfonso Aguilar | Men's Bodyboard | 5.33 | 3 q | 6.90 | 3 | Did not advance | | | | | | | | Did not advance | 7 |
| Alfonso Aguilar | Men's Shortboard | 3.64 | 3 q | 3.93 | 3 | Did not advance | | | | | | | | | 16 |
| Sasha García | Men's Shortboard | 9.17 | 1 Q | | | 8.56 | 3 q | 8.33 | 2 q | 10.73 | 2 q | 9.14 | 4 | Did not advance | 6 |
| Héctor González | Men's Sup Surf Race | | | | | | | | | | | | | DNF | |
| Héctor González | Men's Sup Surf | 7.90 | 2 Q | | | | | 16.29 | 1 Q | | | | | 9.20 | Bronze medal |
| Olivia Ramirez | Women's Bodyboard | 8.00 | 1 Q | | | 11.33 | 1 Q | 7.10 | 2 Q | | | | | 7.20 | Silver medal |
| Summer Sivori | Women's Shortboard | 7.80 | 3 q | 9.33 | 1 q | | | | | 1.90 | 4 | Did not advance | | | 8 |
| Daniela García | Men's Sup Surf Race | | | | | | | | | | | | | 1h 01:00.00 | 5 |
| Aida Ramos | Men's Sup Surf | | | | | | | | | | | | | 4.20 | Silver medal |
