= Beyond Infinity =

Beyond Infinity may refer to:

- "Beyond Infinity", science fiction radio play by Villiers Gerson, aired in 1950 as an episode of Dimension X
- Beyond Infinity (short story collection), a collection of science fiction stories by Robert Spencer Carr, published in 1951
- Beyond Infinity, alternative title of 1961 science fiction anthology by Alan E. Nourse
- Beyond Infinity, the distribution company for the 1987 science fiction comedy film Galactic Gigolo
- Beyond Infinity, science fiction novel by Gregory Benford
- Beyond Infinity, anime adaption of manga series Babel II
- "Beyond Infinity", track on 2008 synth concept album Reality After Midnight by William C. Woxlin
- "Beyond Infinity", 2011 Brazilian death metal track by Thyresis
- Beyond Infinity (mathematics book), nonfiction book about infinity by Eugenia Cheng, published in 2017

== See also ==
- Au-delà de l'Infini [Beyond Infinity], 1952 French science fiction novel by Henri René Guieu
- Slave Girls from Beyond Infinity, 1987 science fiction film
- To Infinity and Beyond (catchphrase)
- To Infinity and Beyond: A Cultural History of the Infinite, 1991 nonfiction book by Eli Maor
