= Marinho (footballer, born 1957) =

Brazilian footballer (1957–2020)

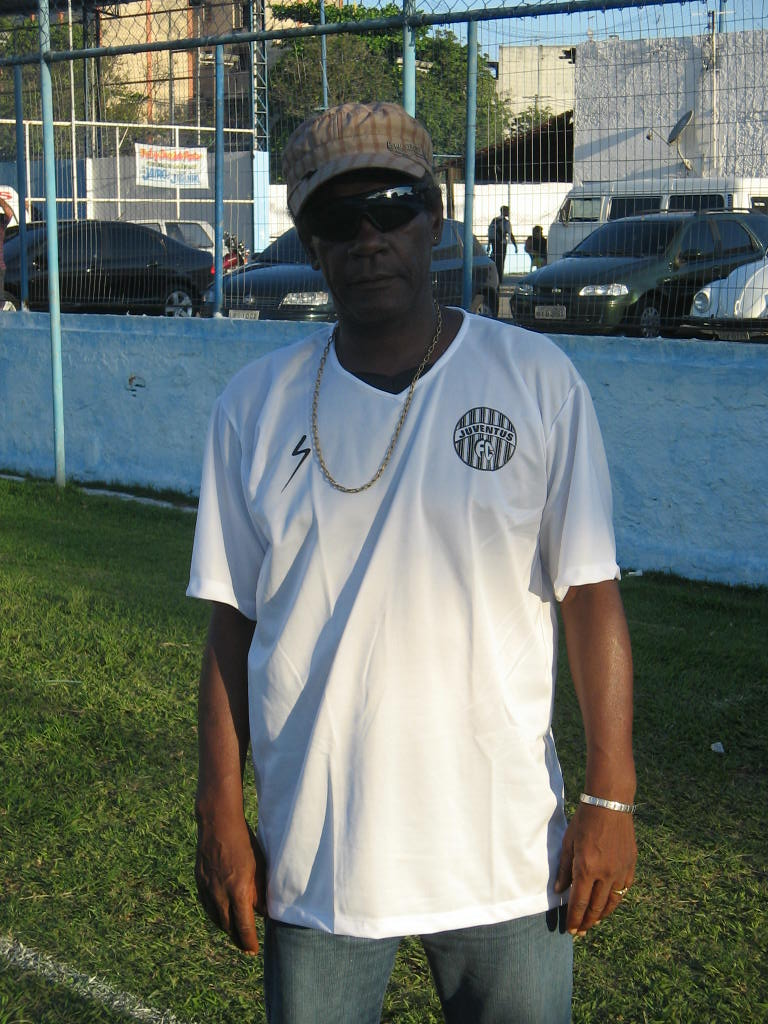
- Marinho in 2009

Personal information
- Full name: Mário José dos Reis Emiliano
- Date of birth: 23 May 1957
- Place of birth: Belo Horizonte, Brazil
- Date of death: 15 June 2020 (aged 63)
- Place of death: Belo Horizonte, Brazil
- Position: Right winger

Youth career
- 1974–1975: Atlético Mineiro

Senior career*
Years	Team	Apps	(Gls)
1976–1979	Atlético Mineiro		
1979–1982	América-SP		
1983–1987	Bangu		
1988–1989	Botafogo		
1989–1990	Bangu		
1991	América-SP		
1991	Pavunense		
1991–1992	Entrerriense		
1993–1994	Bangu		
1994–1995	Americano		
1996	Bangu		

International career
1976	Brazil Olympic	4	(0)
1985–1986	Brazil	15	(1)

Managerial career
- 2008–2009: Céres U17
- 2009: Bangu (assistant manager)
- 2009–2010: Juventus-RJ
- 2012: Juventus-RJ
- 2013–2020: Bangu (assistant manager)
- * Club domestic league appearances and goals

Mário José dos Reis Emiliano (23 May 1957 – 15 June 2020), commonly known as Marinho, was a Brazilian professional footballer and assistant manager of Bangu. He played as a right winger.

He competed in the men's tournament at the 1976 Summer Olympics.

Marinho died on 15 June 2020 after fighting pancreatitis and prostate cancer.
