= Odyssey (Illenium album) =

Studio album by Illenium
- Released: February 6, 2026
- Length: 61:06
- Label: Republic
- Producers: Albert Hype; Alok; Zakk Cervini; Trevor Christensen; Illenium; Andreas Fammé; Drew Fulk; Andrew Goldstein; Jørn Erik Gundhus; William Johansson; Kohen; Lostboy; MashBit; Petey Martin; OhYes; Toby Scott; Alex Seaver; Stargate; Oli Sykes; Victor Thell; Zeds Dead

Illenium chronology
| Illenium (2023) | Odyssey (2026) |

Singles from Odyssey
- 1. "In My Arms" Released: May 16, 2025; 2. "Refuge/Ur Alive" Released: August 1, 2025; 3. "Forever" Released: September 12, 2025; 4. "To the Moon" Released: October 10, 2025; 5. "With Your Love" Released: November 7, 2025; 6. "War" Released: December 15, 2025; 7. "Feel Alive" Released: January 16, 2026

Odyssey (stylized in all caps) is the sixth studio album by the American DJ and record producer Illenium. It was released through Republic Records on February 6, 2026. The album was supported by seven singles: "In My Arms", "Refuge/Ur Alive", "Forever", "To the Moon", "With Your Love", "War", and "Feel Alive". Odyssey reached number 45 on the US Billboard 200, reaching atop on the US Top Dance Albums chart.

== Background ==
After the release of his self-titled fifth studio album in 2023, Illenium parted ways with his previous record label and second major label, Warner Records. On May 7, 2025, it was reported that he had signed with Republic Records and was set to work on new music. In September, he announced the album. He described the signing as the start of a "completely new chapter" and stated that he was excited to work with Republic, as they were "as passionate about his music" as he was.

== Composition ==
Odyssey was produced by Illenium and executive produced by Alex Seaver, with production contributions from Lostboy, Dabin, Alok, Mark Schick, Pink Slip, Zakk Cervini, Drew Fulk, Trevor Christensen, TMS, Toby Scott, OhYes, Wylde, Zeds Dead, Kohen, Andrew Goldstein. It features collaborations with artists from dance, rock, hip-hop, and pop genres, including Ellie Goulding, Bring Me the Horizon, Kid Cudi, Ryan Tedder, Tom Grennan, Elley Duhé, Dean Lewis, Alna, Norma Jean Martine, Hayla, Lauren Alaina, Emmy, and Bastille. Production was handled by Illenium in collaboration with several others, including Lostboy, Dabin, Alok, Mark Schick, Pink Slip, Zakk Cervini, Drew Fulk, Trevor Christensen, TMS, Toby Scott, OhYes, Wylde, Zeds Dead, Kohen, Andrew Goldstein, and Mako.

== Promotion ==
=== Singles ===
Seven singles were released from Odyssey. "In My Arms" featuring British singer Hayla, was released on May 16, 2025, as the album's lead single. It was followed by a double single release on August 1, consisting of "Refuge" with Norma Jean Martine and "Ur Alive" with WYLDE, both serving as the album's second single. "Forever" featuring singer-songwriters Tom Grennan and Alna, was released as the third single on September 12.

The fourth single, "To the Moon" a collaboration with Brazilian DJ Alok, was released on October 10. "With Your Love" featuring OneRepublic lead singer Ryan Tedder, was issued as the fifth single on November 6, alongside the announcement of the album's release date. "War" featuring Lø Spirit, was released as the sixth single on December 15. The seventh single, "Feel Alive", a collaboration with the British band Bastille and Canadian DJ Dabin, was released on January 16, 2026, coinciding with the reveal of the album's track listing.

=== Residency ===
To promote Odyssey, Illenium performed a six-show residency at the Sphere in Las Vegas in March 2026. The record producer collaborated with the Berlin-based animation studio Woodblock to create visuals for the venue. The residency was extended with three additional shows, continuing into April 2026. The residency was then extended further with an additional two shows in July 2026.

== Track listing ==
Odyssey track listing
| No. | Title | Writer(s) | Producer(s) | Length |
|---|---|---|---|---|
| 1. | "Odyssey" | Nicholas Miller | Illenium | 0:36 |
| 2. | "Into the Dark" (with Mako) | Miller; Trevor Christensen; Alex Seaver | Illenium; Christensen; Seaver | 4:20 |
| 3. | "Forever" (with Tom Grennan and Alna) | Miller; James Abrahart; Kyle Buckley; Alna Hofmeyr; Mark Schick | Illenium; Schick; Pink Slip | 2:51 |
| 4. | "With Your Love" (with Ryan Tedder) | Miller; Amy Allen; Peter Rycroft; Ryan Tedder | Illenium; Lostboy | 3:02 |
| 5. | "Feels Like You" (with Elley Duhé) | Miller; Lewis Jankel; JBach; Elley Duhé; Neil Ormandy; Seaver | Illenium; Ormandy^{[v]}; Shift K3Y^{[v]} | 3:32 |
| 6. | "In My Arms" (with Hayla) | Miller; Christensen; Matteo Cinti; Jankel; Jordan Shaw; Hayley Williams | Illenium; Christensen; Shift K3Y^{[v]} | 3:28 |
| 7. | "Don't Want Your Love" (with Ellie Goulding) | Miller; Charlotte Aitchison; Ellie Goulding; Alberto Melendez; Rycroft | Illenium; Lostboy; Albert Hype | 3:12 |
| 8. | "Slave to the Rithm" (with Bring Me the Horizon) | Miller; Zakk Cervini; William Johansson; Lee Malia; Oliver Sykes | Illenium; Cervini; Johansson; Sykes | 4:29 |
| 9. | "War" (with Lø Spirit) | Miller; Cervini; Amira Elfeky; Drew Fulk; Andrew Goldstein | Illenium; Christensen; Cervini; Fulk; Goldstein | 3:05 |
| 10. | "I'll Come Runnin" (with Mako and Zeds Dead) | Miller; Dylan Mamid; Zachary Rapp-Rovan; Seaver | Illenium; Seaver; Zeds Dead | 3:42 |
| 11. | "Take Me Back" (with Dean Lewis) | Miller; Dean Lewis; Brad Mair; Patrick Martin | Illenium; Petey Martin; Mair^{[v]} | 3:02 |
| 12. | "Love Is a Chemical" (with Lauren Alaina) | Miller; Mikkel S. Eriksen; Tor E. Hermansen; Cleo Tighe | Illenium; Stargate; Matt McCartney^{[v]} | 3:37 |
| 13. | "Feel Alive" (with Bastille and Dabin) | Miller; Tom Barnes; Pete Kelleher; Ben Kohn; Dabin Lee; Dan Smith | Illenium; Dabin; TMS | 2:48 |
| 14. | "Monster" (with Emmy) | Miller; Andreas Fammé; Jørn Erik Gundhus; Emmy Kristiansen; Seaver; Kjersti Sleveland | Illenium; Seaver; Fammé^{[p]}; Gundhus^{[p]} | 2:40 |
| 15. | "Refuge" (with Norma Jean Martine) | Miller; Fredrick Dickson; Niall Healy; Norma Jean Martine; Darius Mashayekhi; Andrew Tyler | Illenium; MashBit | 3:21 |
| 16. | "Not Ordinary" (with Kid Cudi) | Miller; Jean Baptiste; Kid Cudi; Victor Thell | Illenium; Thell | 2:33 |
| 17. | "Paris" | Miller; Christensen; Porter Robinson | Illenium | 2:50 |
| 18. | "To the Moon" (with Alok) | Alok Petrillo; Toby Scott; Rob Taylor; Hannah Wilson | Illenium; Alok; Kohen; OhYes; Scott | 4:28 |
| 19. | "Ur Alive" (with Wylde) | Miller; Kristina Corbett; Michael Gazzo | Illenium; Gazzo^{[v]} | 3:30 |
| Total length: | | | | 61:06 |

=== Notes ===
- ^{^[p]} indicates a primary and vocal producer.
- ^{^[v]} indicates a vocal producer.

== Personnel ==
Credits were adapted from Tidal.

=== Musicians ===
- Lara Miller – voice acting (1)
- Mako – vocals (2, 10)
- Mark Schick – guitar, keyboards, programming (3)
- JHart – background vocals (3)
- Ryan Tedder – vocals (4)
- Elley Duhé – vocals (5)
- Hayla – vocals (6)
- Ellie Goulding – vocals (7)
- Harry James – background vocals (8)
- Lø Spirit – vocals (9)
- Taylor Dearman – guitar (11)
- Dean Lewis – vocals (11)
- Lauren Alaina – vocals (12)
- Bastille – vocals (13)
- Andreas Fammé – drums, string arrangement (14)
- Jørn Gundhus – drums, piano, string arrangement (14)
- Emmy – vocals (14)
- Illenium – guitar, keyboards, programming (15, 19); percussion (15); bass, drums, strings (19)
- Norma Jean Martine – vocals (15)
- Kid Cudi – vocals (16)

=== Technical ===
- Illenium – engineering (3, 19)
- Mark Schick – engineering (3)
- Pink Slip – engineering (3)
- Harry James – vocal engineering (8)
- Tom Norris – mixing
- Alex Seaver – pre-production (5)

== Charts ==
Chart performance
| Chart (2026) | Peak position |
|---|---|
| UK Album Downloads (Official Charts) | 73 |
| UK Dance Albums (Official Charts) | 3 |
| US Billboard 200 | 45 |
| US Top Dance Albums (Billboard) | 1 |

== Release history ==
List of release history
| Region | Date | Format(s) | Label | Edition | Ref. |
|---|---|---|---|---|---|
| Various | February 6, 2026 | Digital download; streaming | Republic Records; UMG | Standard | |
| United States | February 6, 2026 | CD | Republic Records; UMG | Standard | |
| United States | February 6, 2026 | CD | Republic Records; UMG | D2C CD Signed | |
| United States | February 6, 2026 | Vinyl | Republic Records; UMG | 2LP Supernova | |
| United States | February 6, 2026 | Vinyl | Republic Records; UMG | 2LP Lunar Ember Signed | |
