= Juventus FC (disambiguation) =

Juventus FC is an Italian association football club from Turin.

Juventus FC may also refer to:

- Juventus FC (women), Juventus FC's women's football team
- Juventus Next Gen, Juventus FC's men's reserve football team
- Juventus FC Youth Sector, Juventus FC's youth system
- Juventus F.C. (Belize), a Belizean football club from Orange Walk Town
- Juventus F.C. (Nicaragua), a Nicaraguan football club from Managua
- Juventus Futebol Clube, a Brazilian football club from Rio de Janeiro
