= Beach handball at the 2022 Central American and Caribbean Beach Games =

Beach Handball at the 2022 Central American and Caribbean Beach Games
- Venue: El Rodadero beach
- Location: (Colombia) Santa Marta
- Dates: 20 – 23 November
- Nations: 7
- Teams: 6 (men); 6 (women)

Beach Handball competition of the 2022 Central American and Caribbean Beach Games in Santa Marta were held from 20 to 23 November at the Rodadero beach.

== Participating teams ==
Men

- Colombia
- Dominican Republic
- Mexico
- Puerto Rico
- Trinidad and Tobago
- Venezuela

Women

- Colombia
- Dominican Republic
- Martinique
- Mexico
- Puerto Rico
- Venezuela

== Medal summary ==
Event	Gold	Silver	Bronze
Men's tournament	Venezuela; Alexander Barranco; Dairo Jose Lopez; Dixon Silva Andueza; Jesus Manuel Barrios; Jesus Ricardo Guarecuco; Jhonny Alberto Peñaloza; Rainner Jose Sejias; Ronal Antonio Timaure; Sanders Alejandro Peñaloza; Wilmer Darci Bracho	Colombia; Andres Felipe Cortes; Cristian Andres Sanchez; Daniel Felipe Lopez; Ediel Orlando Fox; Gregory Stevenson; Heim Howard Mclean; Jeronimo Juan Patiño; Jonathan Brandon Rubio; Juan Pablo Lopez; Neider Diaz Lopez	Trinidad and Tobago; Akim Wills; Chad Phillip; Christoff Phillip; Daneil Williams; Derice Biggart; Emanuel Cummings; Kareem Wylie; Kemuel Eastman; Ronaldo Scott; Stephawn Solomon
Women's tournament	Mexico; Adela Valenzuela; Aida Angelica Zamora; Ana Teocalli Hernández; Andrea Jetzary De León; Claudia Macias Hermosillo; Edna Viridiana Uresty; Gabriela Yael Salazar; Itzel Esmeralda Vargas; Lucia Alejandrina Berra; Martha Eugenia Mejia	Venezuela; Frannelly Juvileth Polanco; Gabriela Yariscar Gamez; Hernairy Teresa Vargas; Iskary Ailin Aguilar; Luz Alexandra Colina; Maikelly Michelle Cedeño; Milangela Coromoto Tovar; Miraidy Jackelin Suarez; Oriana Alexandra Fuentes; Yarketzi Yamiret Moreno	Colombia; Angie Paola Asprilla; Carolina Uribe Ospina; Daniela Ortiz Jarava; Deisy Solis Valencia; Lady Laura Parejo Royero; Maria Clara Estrada; Maria Jose Becerra; Susana Estrada Castaño; Tatiana Cano Vargas; Yerica Paola Julio

== Men's tournament ==
=== Group A ===
Pos	Team	Pld	W	L	SW	SL	Pts
1	Mexico	5	5	0	10	2	10
2	Venezuela	5	4	1	9	3	8
3	Trinidad and Tobago	5	2	3	6	6	4
4	Colombia	5	2	3	5	7	4
5	Dominican Republic	5	2	3	4	7	4
6	Puerto Rico	5	0	5	1	10	0

Team 1	Score	Team 2
20 November 2022
8:45
Mexico	2–1	Venezuela
9:30
Trinidad and Tobago	2–0	Puerto Rico
Colombia	2–0	Dominican Republic
11:00
Dominican Republic	2–1	Trinidad and Tobago
11:45
Venezuela	2–1	Colombia
Puerto Rico	0–2	Mexico
21 November 2022
8:00
Trinidad and Tobago	1–2	Mexico
Dominican Republic	0–2	Venezuela
8:45
Colombia	2–1	Puerto Rico
10:15
Puerto Rico	0–2	Dominican Republic
Trinidad and Tobago	0–2	Venezuela
11:00
Mexico	2–0	Colombia
22 November 2022
10:15
Venezuela	2–0	Puerto Rico
11:00
Dominican Republic	0–2	Mexico
Colombia	0–2	Trinidad and Tobago

== Knockout stage ==
=== Bracket ===
Semifinals
23 November
Venezuela	2
Trinidad and Tobago	0
23 November
Mexico	0
Colombia	2

Final
23 November
Venezuela	2
Colombia	0
Third place
23 November
Trinidad and Tobago	2
Mexico	0

=== 5th-place game ===
Team 1	Score	Team 2
23 November 2022
9:45
Dominican Republic	2–0	Puerto Rico

=== Final ranking ===
Rank	Team
1st place, gold medalist(s)	Venezuela
2nd place, silver medalist(s)	Colombia
3rd place, bronze medalist(s)	Trinidad and Tobago
4	Mexico
5	Dominican Republic
6	Puerto Rico

== Women's tournament ==
=== Group A ===
Pos	Team	Pld	W	L	SW	SL	Pts
1	Mexico	5	4	1	9	2	8
2	Colombia	5	4	1	8	2	8
3	Venezuela	5	3	2	6	5	6
4	Dominican Republic	5	2	3	5	6	4
5	Puerto Rico	5	2	3	4	7	4
6	Martinique	5	0	5	0	10	0

Team 1	Score	Team 2
20 November 2022
8:00
Martinique	0–2	Dominican Republic
Mexico	2–0	Venezuela
8:45
Colombia	2–0	Puerto Rico
10:15
Dominican Republic	0–2	Mexico
Puerto Rico	2–0	Martinique
11:00
Venezuela	0–2	Colombia
21 November 2022
8:45
Martinique	0–2	Mexico
9:30
Puerto Rico	0–2	Venezuela
Colombia	2–0	Dominican Republic
11:00
Martinique	0–2	Venezuela
11:45
Mexico	2–0	Colombia
Dominican Republic	2–0	Puerto Rico
22 November 2022
9:30
Mexico	1–2	Puerto Rico
Venezuela	2–1	Dominican Republic
10:15
Colombia	2–0	Martinique

== Knockout stage ==
=== Bracket ===
Semifinals
23 November
Mexico	2
Dominican Republic	1
23 November
Colombia	1
Venezuela	2

Final
23 November
Mexico	2
Venezuela	0
Third place
23 November
Dominican Republic	0
Colombia	2

=== 5th-place game ===
Team 1	Score	Team 2
23 November 2022
9:00
Puerto Rico	2–0	Martinique

=== Final ranking ===
Rank	Team
1st place, gold medalist(s)	Mexico
2nd place, silver medalist(s)	Venezuela
3rd place, bronze medalist(s)	Colombia
4	Dominican Republic
5	Puerto Rico
6	Martinique
