= Bob's =

Brazilian fast food restaurant chain

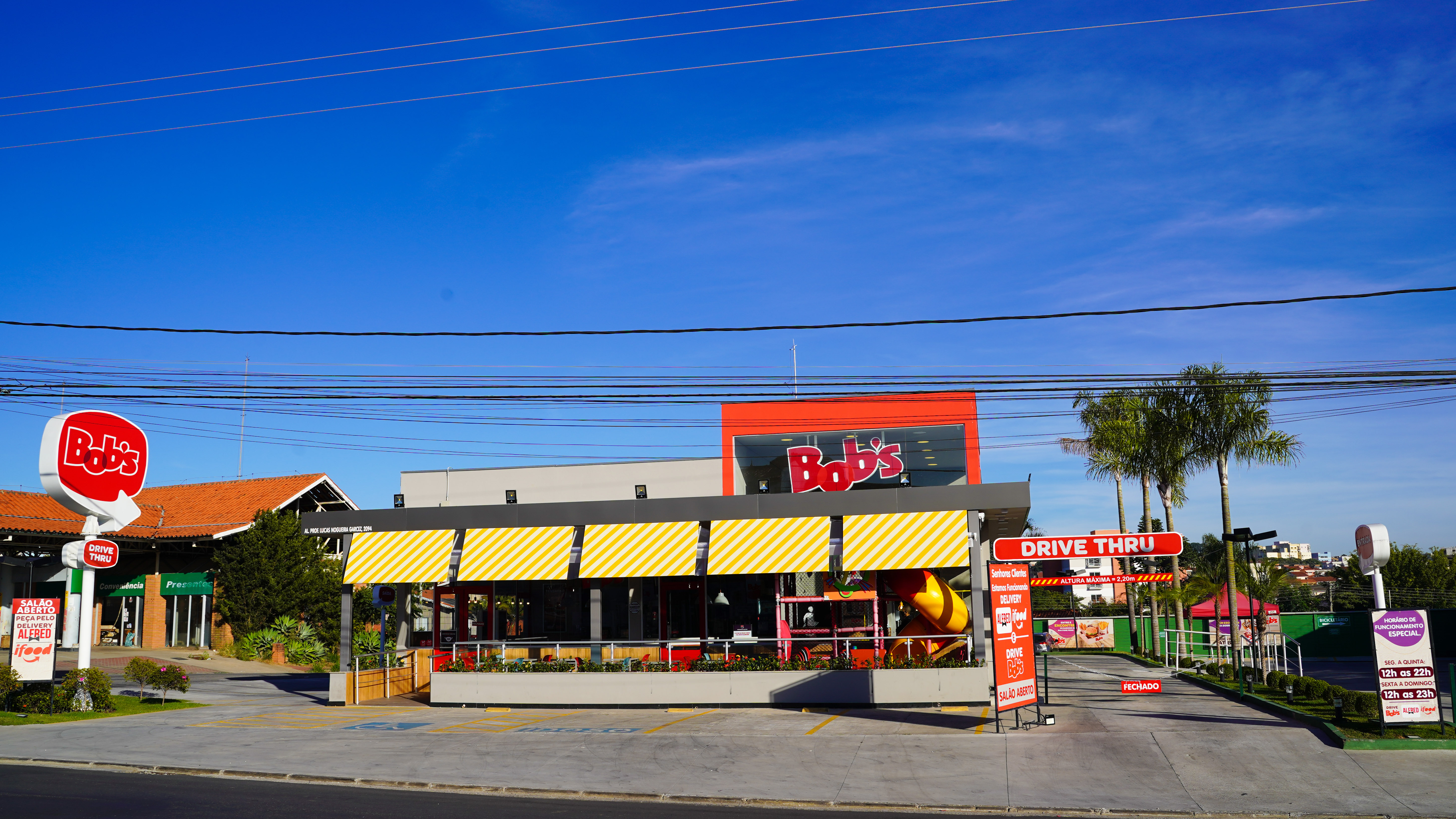
- Type: Subsidiary
- Industry: Fast food
- Founded: 1952; 74 years ago Rio de Janeiro, Brazil
- Founder: Bob Falkenburg
- Headquarters: Rio de Janeiro, Brazil
- Number of locations: 788
- Products: Hamburgers and milkshakes
- Number of employees: 4,000
- Parent: Brazilian Fast Food Corporation
- Website: www.bobs.com.br

Bob's (Portuguese pronunciation: [ˈbɔbis, ˈbɔb(ɨ)ʃ]) is a Brazilian fast food chain, founded in 1952 by the American Brazilian tennis champion Bob Falkenburg, Wimbledon tournament winner in 1948. The first store was opened in the Copacabana neighborhood of Rio de Janeiro. It is the first Brazilian fast food chain.

In 1972, Falkenburg sold the franchise to the Brazilian Fast Food Corporation (BFFC).

== History ==
Bob, as Falkenburg was known, introduced the concept of fast food in the country, opening the first restaurant of this type in Copacabana, Rio de Janeiro. In 1972, however, Falkenburg sold the store, which is now controlled by Brazilians, in Guarujá. Today the chain has a varied menu.

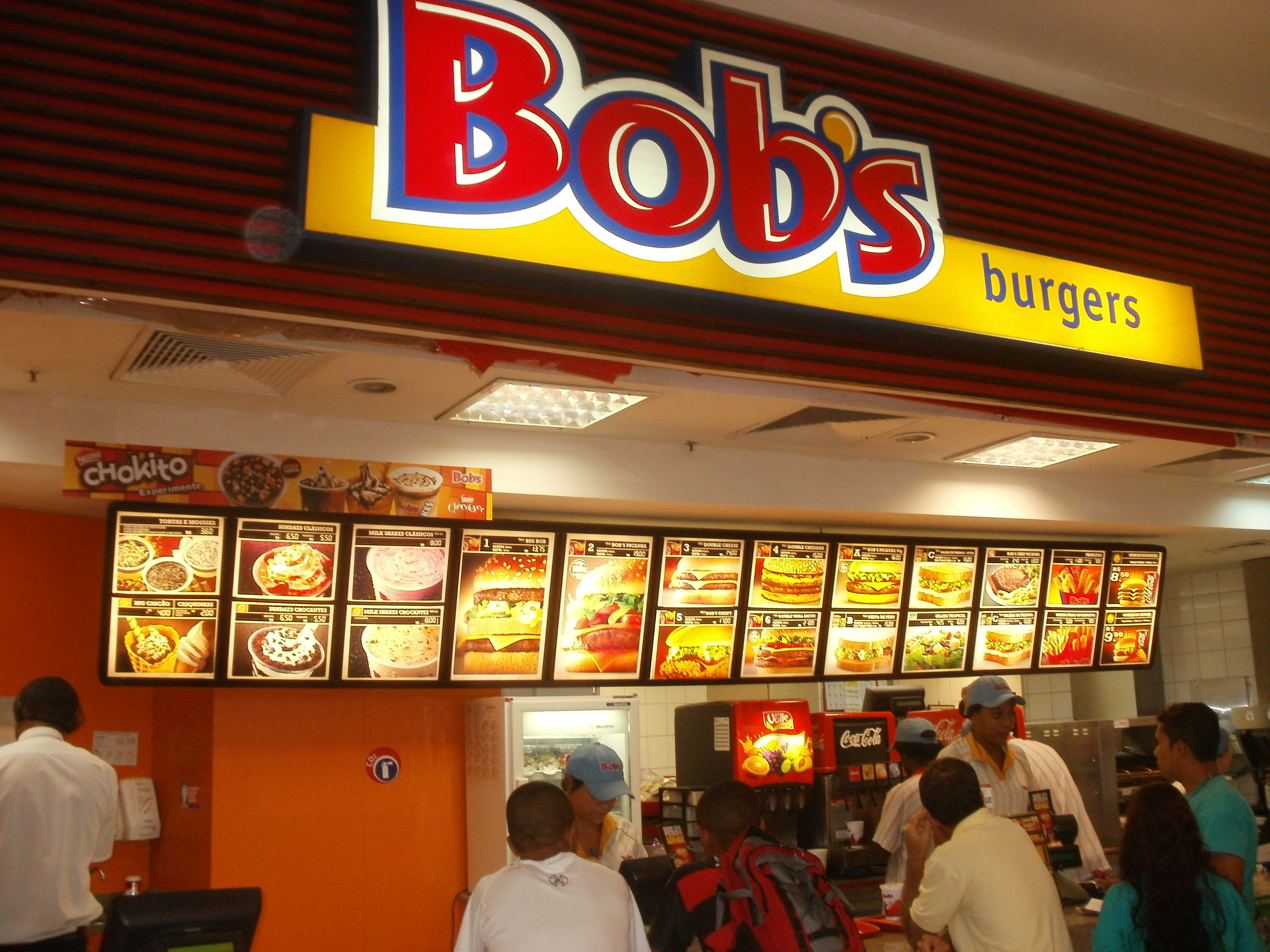
A restaurant in Caxias Shopping

Bob's is known for serving food with flavors inspired by Brazilian cuisine, such as hamburgers with picanha. One of their main and most popular burgers is the Big Bob, made in a similar fashion and to compete with McDonald's' Big Mac, much like Burger King's Big King. Although similar in composition to the competing burger, it does not contain pickles, and uses its own sauce. In 2024, they started to sell the sauce separately in most Brazilian supermarkets.

Bob's former logo, circa 2000

The most popular items sold by the franchise are the milkshakes, especially the Ovomaltine flavor. In 2016, Bob's did not renew the exclusivity contract they had with Ovomaltine since 2005; thus, they were not allowed to use the name in branding anymore, prompting McDonald's Brazil to acquire exclusive rights to use the name. However, that did not stop the chain from selling the item, as long as it was named differently.

== Business model ==
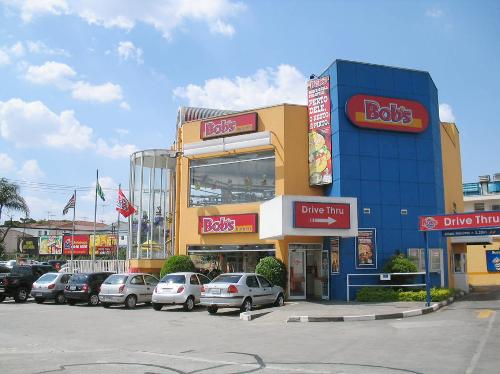
A Bob's restaurant in 2008

In 1984 Bob's started a franchising system, opening new stores in Vitória, Espírito Santo. Since then, Bob's has been expanding within Brazil and internationally. As of June 2011, there are about 811 stores in Brazil, of which about 320 are franchises. At one point, international stores were opened in Portugal (Carcavelos, Algés and Bragança) as well as in Chile and Angola, however since 2021 the company's website shows that they have closed.

== Other brands ==
Bob's Shakes, formerly known as "Bob’s Sorvetes" (Bob's Ice Cream), sells frozen desserts such as ice cream, milkshakes, and pies. It was rebranded to the current name in 2009 due to the increased popularity of its milkshakes compared to regular ice cream.

Bexpress by Bob's offers half-finished and ready sandwiches to be heated in the oven, which can be eaten in or carried out.

== See also ==
- List of hamburger restaurants
