= 2018 Women's Beach Handball World Championships =

2018 IHF Women's Beach Handball World Championship

Tournament details
- Host country: Russia
- Venue: 1 (in 1 host city)
- Dates: 24–29 July
- Teams: 16 (from 5 confederations)

Final positions
- Champions: Greece (1st title)
- Runners-up: Norway
- Third place: Brazil
- Fourth place: Spain

Tournament statistics
- Top scorers: (Mexico) Edna Uresti (123 points)

Awards
- Best player: (Brazil) Juliana Oliveira

The 2018 Women's Beach Handball World Championships were the eighth edition of the tournament, held at Kazan, Russia from 24 to 29 July 2018.

Greece won the title on their first ever participation, defeating Norway in the final.

== Qualification ==
Qualification	Vacancies	Qualified
Host	1	Russia
Defending champion	1	Spain
2017 Asian Beach Handball Championship	3	Thailand; Vietnam; Chinese Taipei
2017 European Beach Handball Championship	4	Norway; Poland; Denmark; Greece
2018 Oceania Beach Handball Championship	1	Australia
2018 Pan American Men's Beach Handball Championship	4	Brazil; Mexico; Paraguay; Uruguay
Substitute for Africa continent	1	France
Wildcard	1	United States

== Draw ==
The draw was held on 15 May 2018 at Kazan, Russia.

=== Seeding ===
The seedings were announced on 14 May 2018.

Pot 1	Pot 2	Pot 3	Pot 4
Spain; Brazil; Norway; Poland	Denmark; Thailand; Uruguay; Australia	Greece; France; Vietnam; Russia	Chinese Taipei; Paraguay; Mexico; United States

All times are local (UTC+3).

== Preliminary round ==
=== Group A ===
Pos	Team	Pld	W	L	Pts	SW	SL	SR	SPW	SPL	SPR	Qualification
1	Spain	3	3	0	6	6	1	6.000	99	69	1.435	Main round
2	Greece	3	2	1	4	5	4	1.250	99	93	1.065	Main round
3	Paraguay	3	1	2	2	3	5	0.600	87	109	0.798	Main round
4	Australia	3	0	3	0	2	6	0.333	79	93	0.849	Consolation round

Source: IHF
Rules for classification: 1) Points; 2) Head-to-head points; 3) Head-to-head set difference; 4) Head-to-head points won; 5) Set difference; 6) Points won; 7) Draw.

24 July 2018; 12:20	Spain	2–1	Greece	Beach Sports Complex, Kazan; Referees: Pablo Martínez, Luiz Monico (URU)
24 July 2018; 12:20	(10–20, 14–8, 2–0); Report			Beach Sports Complex, Kazan; Referees: Pablo Martínez, Luiz Monico (URU)

24 July 2018; 12:20	Australia	1–2	Paraguay	Beach Sports Complex, Kazan; Referees: Cao Hongjun, Xu Jian (CHN)
24 July 2018; 12:20	(13–12, 10–11, 4–8); Report			Beach Sports Complex, Kazan; Referees: Cao Hongjun, Xu Jian (CHN)

24 July 2018; 16:30	Greece	2–1	Australia	Beach Sports Complex, Kazan; Referees: Wanderson Oliveira, Fabiano Carvalho (BRA)
24 July 2018; 16:30	(18–16, 10–12, 6–4); Report			Beach Sports Complex, Kazan; Referees: Wanderson Oliveira, Fabiano Carvalho (BRA)

24 July 2018; 17:20	Paraguay	0–2	Spain	Beach Sports Complex, Kazan; Referees: Dávid Palkovits, Gabor Szilvási (HUN)
24 July 2018; 17:20	(15–24, 6–21); Report			Beach Sports Complex, Kazan; Referees: Dávid Palkovits, Gabor Szilvási (HUN)

25 July 2018; 10:20	Spain	2–0	Australia	Beach Sports Complex, Kazan; Referees: Khaled Al-Heel, Ali-Al Yazeedi (QAT)
25 July 2018; 10:20	(10–8, 18–12); Report			Beach Sports Complex, Kazan; Referees: Khaled Al-Heel, Ali-Al Yazeedi (QAT)

25 July 2018; 10:20	Greece	2–1	Paraguay	Beach Sports Complex, Kazan; Referees: Ana Carina Barbosa, Nadia Machado (POR)
25 July 2018; 10:20	(17–14, 14–17, 6–4); Report			Beach Sports Complex, Kazan; Referees: Ana Carina Barbosa, Nadia Machado (POR)

=== Group B ===
Pos	Team	Pld	W	L	Pts	SW	SL	SR	SPW	SPL	SPR	Qualification
1	Poland	3	3	0	6	6	0	MAX	115	84	1.369	Main round
2	Chinese Taipei	3	2	1	4	4	4	1.000	111	134	0.828	Main round
3	Uruguay	3	1	2	2	3	5	0.600	100	103	0.971	Main round
4	France	3	0	3	0	2	6	0.333	109	114	0.956	Consolation round

Source: IHF
Rules for classification: 1) Points; 2) Head-to-head points; 3) Head-to-head set difference; 4) Head-to-head points won; 5) Set difference; 6) Points won; 7) Draw.

24 July 2018; 12:20	Uruguay	1–2	Chinese Taipei	Beach Sports Complex, Kazan; Referees: Laura Buchón-Perea, Patricia del Valle-Encuentra (ESP)
24 July 2018; 12:20	(15–17, 20–15, 4–5); Report			Beach Sports Complex, Kazan; Referees: Laura Buchón-Perea, Patricia del Valle-Encuentra (ESP)

24 July 2018; 13:10	Poland	2–0	France	Beach Sports Complex, Kazan; Referees: Wanderson Oliveira, Fabiano Carvalho (BRA)
24 July 2018; 13:10	(20–10, 18–15); Report			Beach Sports Complex, Kazan; Referees: Wanderson Oliveira, Fabiano Carvalho (BRA)

24 July 2018; 17:20	France	1–2	Uruguay	Beach Sports Complex, Kazan; Referees: Khaled Al-Heel, Ali Al-Yazeedi (QAT)
24 July 2018; 17:20	(17–14, 12–13, 6–7); Report			Beach Sports Complex, Kazan; Referees: Khaled Al-Heel, Ali Al-Yazeedi (QAT)

24 July 2018; 20:20	Chinese Taipei	0–2	Poland	Beach Sports Complex, Kazan; Referees: Ana Carina Barbosa, Nadia Machado (POR)
24 July 2018; 20:20	(18–29, 14–17); Report			Beach Sports Complex, Kazan; Referees: Ana Carina Barbosa, Nadia Machado (POR)

25 July 2018; 12:00	Poland	2–0	Uruguay	Beach Sports Complex, Kazan; Referees: Cao Hongjun, Xu Jian (CHN)
25 July 2018; 12:00	(15–13, 16–14); Report			Beach Sports Complex, Kazan; Referees: Cao Hongjun, Xu Jian (CHN)

25 July 2018; 12:00	France	1–2	Chinese Taipei	Beach Sports Complex, Kazan; Referees: Dávid Palkovits, Gabor Szilvási (HUN)
25 July 2018; 12:00	(21–22, 18–9, 10–11); Report			Beach Sports Complex, Kazan; Referees: Dávid Palkovits, Gabor Szilvási (HUN)

=== Group C ===
Pos	Team	Pld	W	L	Pts	SW	SL	SR	SPW	SPL	SPR	Qualification
1	Brazil	3	3	0	6	6	0	MAX	129	70	1.843	Main round
2	Russia (H)	3	2	1	4	4	2	2.000	105	70	1.500	Main round
3	Thailand	3	1	2	2	2	4	0.500	81	116	0.698	Main round
4	United States	3	0	3	0	0	6	0.000	67	126	0.532	Consolation round

Source: IHF
Rules for classification: 1) Points; 2) Head-to-head points; 3) Head-to-head set difference; 4) Head-to-head points won; 5) Set difference; 6) Points won; 7) Draw.
(H) Host

24 July 2018; 10:40	Brazil	2–0	Russia	Beach Sports Complex, Kazan; Referees: Khaled Al-Heel, Ali Al-Yazeedi (QAT)
24 July 2018; 10:40	(14–11, 14–12); Report			Beach Sports Complex, Kazan; Referees: Khaled Al-Heel, Ali Al-Yazeedi (QAT)

24 July 2018; 10:40	Thailand	2–0	United States	Beach Sports Complex, Kazan; Referees: Ana Carina Barbosa, Nadia Machado (POR)
24 July 2018; 10:40	(17–11, 16–15); Report			Beach Sports Complex, Kazan; Referees: Ana Carina Barbosa, Nadia Machado (POR)

24 July 2018; 15:40	United States	0–2	Brazil	Beach Sports Complex, Kazan; Referees: Laura Buchón-Perea, Patricia del Valle-Encuentra (ESP)
24 July 2018; 15:40	(11–25, 12–24); Report			Beach Sports Complex, Kazan; Referees: Laura Buchón-Perea, Patricia del Valle-Encuentra (ESP)

24 July 2018; 17:20	Russia	2–0	Thailand	Beach Sports Complex, Kazan; Referees: Mohammed Drissi, Mohammed Ben Salah (TUN)
24 July 2018; 17:20	(18–10, 20–14); Report			Beach Sports Complex, Kazan; Referees: Mohammed Drissi, Mohammed Ben Salah (TUN)

25 July 2018; 17:30	Russia	2–0	United States	Beach Sports Complex, Kazan; Referees: Pablo Martínez, Luiz Monico (URU)
25 July 2018; 17:30	(24–10, 20–8); Report			Beach Sports Complex, Kazan; Referees: Pablo Martínez, Luiz Monico (URU)

25 July 2018; 17:30	Brazil	2–0	Thailand	Beach Sports Complex, Kazan; Referees: Cao Hongjun, Xu Jian (CHN)
25 July 2018; 17:30	(20–14, 32–10); Report			Beach Sports Complex, Kazan; Referees: Cao Hongjun, Xu Jian (CHN)

=== Group D ===
Pos	Team	Pld	W	L	Pts	SW	SL	SR	SPW	SPL	SPR	Qualification
1	Norway	3	3	0	6	6	0	MAX	125	96	1.302	Main round
2	Denmark	3	2	1	4	4	2	2.000	121	84	1.440	Main round
3	Vietnam	3	1	2	2	2	5	0.400	92	112	0.821	Main round
4	Mexico	3	0	3	0	1	6	0.167	92	138	0.667	Consolation round

Source: IHF
Rules for classification: 1) Points; 2) Head-to-head points; 3) Head-to-head set difference; 4) Head-to-head points won; 5) Set difference; 6) Points won; 7) Draw.

24 July 2018; 09:00	Norway	2–0	Vietnam	Beach Sports Complex, Kazan; Attendance: 50; Referees: Khaled Al-Heel, Ali Al-Yazeedi (QAT)
24 July 2018; 09:00	(14–11, 17–15); Report			Beach Sports Complex, Kazan; Attendance: 50; Referees: Khaled Al-Heel, Ali Al-Yazeedi (QAT)

24 July 2018; 09:50	Denmark	2–0	Mexico	Beach Sports Complex, Kazan; Referees: Laura Buchón-Perea, Patricia del Valle-Encuentra (ESP)
24 July 2018; 09:50	(18–10, 28–6); Report			Beach Sports Complex, Kazan; Referees: Laura Buchón-Perea, Patricia del Valle-Encuentra (ESP)

24 July 2018; 14:50	Vietnam	0–2	Denmark	Beach Sports Complex, Kazan; Referees: Ana Carina Barbosa, Nadia Machado (POR)
24 July 2018; 14:50	(9–19, 18–22); Report			Beach Sports Complex, Kazan; Referees: Ana Carina Barbosa, Nadia Machado (POR)

24 July 2018; 14:50	Mexico	0–2	Norway	Beach Sports Complex, Kazan; Referees: Cao Hongjun, Xu Jian (CHN)
24 July 2018; 14:50	(17–27, 19–26); Report			Beach Sports Complex, Kazan; Referees: Cao Hongjun, Xu Jian (CHN)

25 July 2018; 15:50	Norway	2–0	Denmark	Beach Sports Complex, Kazan; Referees: Wanderson Oliveira, Fabiano Carvalho (BRA)
25 July 2018; 15:50	(20–16, 21–18); Report			Beach Sports Complex, Kazan; Referees: Wanderson Oliveira, Fabiano Carvalho (BRA)

25 July 2018; 15:50	Vietnam	2–1	Mexico	Beach Sports Complex, Kazan; Referees: Michail Mertinian, Evangelos Syrepisios (GRE)
25 July 2018; 15:50	(12–16, 22–20, 5–4); Report			Beach Sports Complex, Kazan; Referees: Michail Mertinian, Evangelos Syrepisios (GRE)

== Consolation round ==
Pos	Team	Pld	W	L	Pts	SW	SL	SR	SPW	SPL	SPR
1	France	3	3	0	6	6	0	MAX	93	56	1.661
2	Australia	3	2	1	4	4	3	1.333	105	99	1.061
3	Mexico	3	1	2	2	3	4	0.750	109	103	1.058
4	United States	3	0	3	0	0	6	0.000	55	104	0.529

Source: IHF
Rules for classification: 1) Points; 2) Head-to-head points; 3) Head-to-head set difference; 4) Head-to-head points won; 5) Set difference; 6) Points won; 7) Draw.

26 July 2018; 09:00	Australia	2–0	United States	Beach Sports Complex, Kazan; Referees: Wanderson Oliveira, Fabiano Carvalho (BRA)
26 July 2018; 09:00	(22–12, 14–9); Report			Beach Sports Complex, Kazan; Referees: Wanderson Oliveira, Fabiano Carvalho (BRA)

26 July 2018; 13:10	France	2–0	Mexico	Beach Sports Complex, Kazan; Referees: Mohammed Drissi, Mohammed Ben Salah (TUN)
26 July 2018; 13:10	(18–16, 12–10); Report			Beach Sports Complex, Kazan; Referees: Mohammed Drissi, Mohammed Ben Salah (TUN)

26 July 2018; 17:20	United States	0–2	France	Beach Sports Complex, Kazan; Referees: Ana Carina Barbosa, Nadia Machado (POR)
26 July 2018; 17:20	(3–12, 8–20); Report			Beach Sports Complex, Kazan; Referees: Ana Carina Barbosa, Nadia Machado (POR)

26 July 2018; 18:10	Mexico	1–2	Australia	Beach Sports Complex, Kazan; Referees: Cao Hongjun, Xu Jian (CHN)
26 July 2018; 18:10	(19–16, 12–16, 16–18); Report			Beach Sports Complex, Kazan; Referees: Cao Hongjun, Xu Jian (CHN)

27 July 2018; 10:40	Australia	0–2	France	Beach Sports Complex, Kazan; Referees: Pablo Martínez, Luiz Monico (URU)
27 July 2018; 10:40	(8–17, 11–14); Report			Beach Sports Complex, Kazan; Referees: Pablo Martínez, Luiz Monico (URU)

27 July 2018; 11:30	United States	0–2	Mexico	Beach Sports Complex, Kazan; Referees: Laura Buchón-Perea, Patricia del Valle-Encuentra (ESP)
27 July 2018; 11:30	(13–20, 10–16); Report			Beach Sports Complex, Kazan; Referees: Laura Buchón-Perea, Patricia del Valle-Encuentra (ESP)

== Main round ==
=== Group I ===
Points obtained against teams from the same group were carried over.

Pos	Team	Pld	W	L	Pts	SW	SL	SR	SPW	SPL	SPR	Qualification
1	Spain	5	5	0	10	10	1	10.000	189	128	1.477	Quarterfinals
2	Poland	5	3	2	6 (Note: Greece 0–2 Poland)	7	4	1.750	175	153	1.144	Quarterfinals
3	Greece	5	3	2	6	7	6	1.167	175	147	1.190	Quarterfinals
4	Paraguay	5	2	3	4	5	7	0.714	157	197	0.797	Quarterfinals
5	Chinese Taipei	5	1	4	2 (Note: Uruguay 1–2 Chinese Taipei)	3	9	0.333	166	217	0.765	
6	Uruguay	5	1	4	2	4	9	0.444	151	171	0.883	

Source: IHF
Rules for classification: 1) Points; 2) Head-to-head points; 3) Head-to-head set difference; 4) Head-to-head points won; 5) Set difference; 6) Points won; 7) Draw.
Notes:

26 July 2018; 10:40	Spain	2–0	Uruguay	Beach Sports Complex, Kazan; Referees: Ana Carina Barbosa, Nadia Machado (POR)
26 July 2018; 10:40	(14–7, 18–11); Report			Beach Sports Complex, Kazan; Referees: Ana Carina Barbosa, Nadia Machado (POR)

26 July 2018; 10:40	Greece	2–0	Chinese Taipei	Beach Sports Complex, Kazan; Referees: Wanderson Oliveira, Fabiano Carvalho (BRA)
26 July 2018; 10:40	(22–14, 20–10); Report			Beach Sports Complex, Kazan; Referees: Wanderson Oliveira, Fabiano Carvalho (BRA)

26 July 2018; 10:40	Paraguay	2–1	Poland	Beach Sports Complex, Kazan; Referees: Dávid Palkovits, Gabor Szilvási (HUN)
26 July 2018; 10:40	(9–17, 12–8, 6–5); Report			Beach Sports Complex, Kazan; Referees: Dávid Palkovits, Gabor Szilvási (HUN)

26 July 2018; 15:40	Greece	0–2	Poland	Beach Sports Complex, Kazan; Referees: Mohammed Drissi, Mohammed Ben Salah (TUN)
26 July 2018; 15:40	(18–20, 10–16); Report			Beach Sports Complex, Kazan; Referees: Mohammed Drissi, Mohammed Ben Salah (TUN)

26 July 2018; 15:40	Spain	2–0	Chinese Taipei	Beach Sports Complex, Kazan; Referees: Dávid Palkovits, Gabor Szilvási (HUN)
26 July 2018; 15:40	(26–18, 21–11); Report			Beach Sports Complex, Kazan; Referees: Dávid Palkovits, Gabor Szilvási (HUN)

26 July 2018; 15:40	Paraguay	1–2	Uruguay	Beach Sports Complex, Kazan; Referees: Khaled Al-Heel, Ali Al-Yazeedi (QAT)
26 July 2018; 15:40	(6–16, 19–18, 6–7); Report			Beach Sports Complex, Kazan; Referees: Khaled Al-Heel, Ali Al-Yazeedi (QAT)

27 July 2018; 15:00	Spain	2–0	Poland	Beach Sports Complex, Kazan; Referees: Wanderson Oliveira, Fabiano Carvalho (BRA)
27 July 2018; 15:00	(19–16, 20–16); Report			Beach Sports Complex, Kazan; Referees: Wanderson Oliveira, Fabiano Carvalho (BRA)

27 July 2018; 15:00	Greece	2–1	Uruguay	Beach Sports Complex, Kazan; Referees: Dávid Palkovits, Gabor Szilvási (HUN)
27 July 2018; 15:00	(10–14, 21–6, 9–6); Report			Beach Sports Complex, Kazan; Referees: Dávid Palkovits, Gabor Szilvási (HUN)

27 July 2018; 15:00	Paraguay	2–1	Chinese Taipei	Beach Sports Complex, Kazan; Referees: Ana Carina Barbosa, Nadia Machado (POR)
27 July 2018; 15:00	(13–25, 21–13, 9–6); Report			Beach Sports Complex, Kazan; Referees: Ana Carina Barbosa, Nadia Machado (POR)

=== Group II ===
Points obtained against teams from the same group were carried over.

Pos	Team	Pld	W	L	Pts	SW	SL	SR	SPW	SPL	SPR	Qualification
1	Brazil	5	5	0	10	10	1	10.000	198	147	1.347	Quarterfinals
2	Russia (H)	5	4	1	8	8	2	4.000	164	124	1.323	Quarterfinals
3	Norway	5	3	2	6	6	4	1.500	165	149	1.107	Quarterfinals
4	Denmark	5	2	3	4	4	6	0.667	162	164	0.988	Quarterfinals
5	Vietnam	5	1	4	2	3	8	0.375	149	183	0.814	
6	Thailand	5	0	5	0	0	10	0.000	123	194	0.634	

Source: IHF
Rules for classification: 1) Points; 2) Head-to-head points; 3) Head-to-head set difference; 4) Head-to-head points won; 5) Set difference; 6) Points won; 7) Draw.
(H) Host

26 July 2018; 12:20	Brazil	2–1	Vietnam	Beach Sports Complex, Kazan; Referees: Khaled Al-Heel, Ali Al-Yazeedi (QAT)
26 July 2018; 12:20	(12–10, 18–19, 6–4); Report			Beach Sports Complex, Kazan; Referees: Khaled Al-Heel, Ali Al-Yazeedi (QAT)

26 July 2018; 12:20	Russia	2–0	Denmark	Beach Sports Complex, Kazan; Referees: Laura Buchón-Perea, Patricia del Valle-Encuentra (ESP)
26 July 2018; 12:20	(20–18, 11–10); Report			Beach Sports Complex, Kazan; Referees: Laura Buchón-Perea, Patricia del Valle-Encuentra (ESP)

26 July 2018; 12:20	Thailand	0–2	Norway	Beach Sports Complex, Kazan; Referees: Ana Carina Barbosa, Nadia Machado (POR)
26 July 2018; 12:20	(11–18, 10–16); Report			Beach Sports Complex, Kazan; Referees: Ana Carina Barbosa, Nadia Machado (POR)

26 July 2018; 17:20	Brazil	2–0	Denmark	Beach Sports Complex, Kazan; Referees: Mohammed Drissi, Mohammed Ben Salah (TUN)
26 July 2018; 17:20	(22–12, 18–16); Report			Beach Sports Complex, Kazan; Referees: Mohammed Drissi, Mohammed Ben Salah (TUN)

26 July 2018; 17:20	Thailand	0–2	Vietnam	Beach Sports Complex, Kazan; Referees: Pablo Martínez, Luiz Monico (URU)
26 July 2018; 17:20	(14–19, 15–20); Report			Beach Sports Complex, Kazan; Referees: Pablo Martínez, Luiz Monico (URU)

26 July 2018; 18:10	Russia	2–0	Norway	Beach Sports Complex, Kazan; Referees: Michail Mertinian, Evangelos Syrepisios (GRE)
26 July 2018; 18:10	(12–8, 14–12); Report			Beach Sports Complex, Kazan; Referees: Michail Mertinian, Evangelos Syrepisios (GRE)

27 July 2018; 17:30	Brazil	2–0	Norway	Beach Sports Complex, Kazan; Referees: Laura Buchón-Perea, Patricia del Valle-Encuentra (ESP)
27 July 2018; 17:30	(17–16, 25–23); Report			Beach Sports Complex, Kazan; Referees: Laura Buchón-Perea, Patricia del Valle-Encuentra (ESP)

27 July 2018; 17:30	Russia	2–0	Vietnam	Beach Sports Complex, Kazan; Referees: Dávid Palkovits, Gabor Szilvási (HUN)
27 July 2018; 17:30	(22–8, 24–16); Report			Beach Sports Complex, Kazan; Referees: Dávid Palkovits, Gabor Szilvási (HUN)

27 July 2018; 17:30	Thailand	0–2	Denmark	Beach Sports Complex, Kazan; Referees: Cao Hongjun, Xu Jian (CHN)
27 July 2018; 17:30	(12–13, 13–18); Report			Beach Sports Complex, Kazan; Referees: Cao Hongjun, Xu Jian (CHN)

== Knockout stage ==
Championship bracket

Quarterfinals
Spain	2
Denmark	1
Russia	1
Greece	2
Poland	1
Norway	2
Brazil	2
Paraguay	0

Semifinals
Spain	1
Greece	2
Norway	2
Brazil	0

Final
Greece	2
Norway	1
Third place
Spain	0
Brazil	2

Fifth place bracket

5–8th place semifinals
Denmark	2
Russia	0
Poland	2
Paraguay	0

Fifth place game
Denmark	2
Poland	1
Seventh place game
Russia	2
Paraguay	0

9–16th place bracket

9–16th place quarterfinals
Vietnam	2
United States	0
Thailand	0
France	2
Chinese Taipei	1
Mexico	2
Uruguay	2
Australia	1

9–12th place semifinals
Vietnam	2
France	1
Mexico	0
Uruguay	2

Ninth place game
Vietnam	2
Uruguay	0
Eleventh place game
France	2
Mexico	0

13–16th place bracket

13–16th place semifinals
United States	2
Thailand	0
Chinese Taipei	2
Australia	0

13th place game
United States	0
Chinese Taipei	2
15th place game
Thailand	2
Australia	1

=== 9–16th place quarterfinals ===
28 July 2018; 09:50	Vietnam	2–0	United States	Beach Sports Complex, Kazan; Referees: Mohammed Drissi, Mohammed Ben Salah (TUN)
28 July 2018; 09:50	(15–12, 19–18); Report			Beach Sports Complex, Kazan; Referees: Mohammed Drissi, Mohammed Ben Salah (TUN)

28 July 2018; 10:40	Thailand	0–2	France	Beach Sports Complex, Kazan; Referees: Wanderson Oliveira, Fabiano Carvalho (BRA)
28 July 2018; 10:40	(18–19, 18–24); Report			Beach Sports Complex, Kazan; Referees: Wanderson Oliveira, Fabiano Carvalho (BRA)

28 July 2018; 12:20	Chinese Taipei	1–2	Mexico	Beach Sports Complex, Kazan; Referees: Khaled Al-Heel, Ali Al-Yazeedi (QAT)
28 July 2018; 12:20	(17–23, 23–17, 4–7); Report			Beach Sports Complex, Kazan; Referees: Khaled Al-Heel, Ali Al-Yazeedi (QAT)

28 July 2018; 13:10	Uruguay	2–1	Australia	Beach Sports Complex, Kazan; Referees: Laura Buchón-Perea, Patricia del Valle-Encuentra (ESP)
28 July 2018; 13:10	(19–7, 11–16, 9–8); Report			Beach Sports Complex, Kazan; Referees: Laura Buchón-Perea, Patricia del Valle-Encuentra (ESP)

=== Quarterfinals ===
28 July 2018; 09:50	Paraguay	0–2	Brazil	Beach Sports Complex, Kazan; Referees: Cao Hongjun, Xu Jian (CHN)
28 July 2018; 09:50	(11–16, 12–17); Report			Beach Sports Complex, Kazan; Referees: Cao Hongjun, Xu Jian (CHN)

28 July 2018; 09:50	Poland	1–2	Norway	Beach Sports Complex, Kazan; Referees: Pablo Martínez, Luiz Monico (URU)
28 July 2018; 09:50	(17–16, 9–24, 4–6); Report			Beach Sports Complex, Kazan; Referees: Pablo Martínez, Luiz Monico (URU)

28 July 2018; 12:20	Spain	2–1	Denmark	Beach Sports Complex, Kazan; Referees: Ana Carina Barbosa, Nadia Machado (POR)
28 July 2018; 12:20	(22–20, 11–15, 9–6); Report			Beach Sports Complex, Kazan; Referees: Ana Carina Barbosa, Nadia Machado (POR)

28 July 2018; 12:20	Greece	2–1	Russia	Beach Sports Complex, Kazan; Referees: Wanderson Oliveira, Fabiano Carvalho (BRA)
28 July 2018; 12:20	(20–25, 22–18, 12–10); Report			Beach Sports Complex, Kazan; Referees: Wanderson Oliveira, Fabiano Carvalho (BRA)

=== 13–16th place semifinals ===
28 July 2018; 15:00	United States	2–0	Thailand	Beach Sports Complex, Kazan; Referees: Khaled Al-Heel, Ali Al-Yazeedi (QAT)
28 July 2018; 15:00	(14–12, 19–18); Report			Beach Sports Complex, Kazan; Referees: Khaled Al-Heel, Ali Al-Yazeedi (QAT)

28 July 2018; 16:40	Chinese Taipei	2–0	Australia	Beach Sports Complex, Kazan; Referees: Michail Mertinian, Evangelos Syrepisios (GRE)
28 July 2018; 16:40	(20–14, 21–18); Report			Beach Sports Complex, Kazan; Referees: Michail Mertinian, Evangelos Syrepisios (GRE)

=== 9–12th place semifinals ===
28 July 2018; 15:00	Vietnam	2–1	France	Beach Sports Complex, Kazan; Referees: Laura Buchón-Perea, Patricia del Valle-Encuentra (ESP)
28 July 2018; 15:00	(20–30, 21–17, 7–6); Report			Beach Sports Complex, Kazan; Referees: Laura Buchón-Perea, Patricia del Valle-Encuentra (ESP)

28 July 2018; 16:40	Mexico	0–2	Uruguay	Beach Sports Complex, Kazan; Referees: Cao Hongjun, Xu Jian (CHN)
28 July 2018; 16:40	(14–17, 6–7); Report			Beach Sports Complex, Kazan; Referees: Cao Hongjun, Xu Jian (CHN)

=== 5–8th place semifinals ===
28 July 2018; 15:00	Paraguay	0–2	Poland	Beach Sports Complex, Kazan; Referees: Michail Mertinian, Evangelos Syrepisios (GRE)
28 July 2018; 15:00	(12–13, 16–19); Report			Beach Sports Complex, Kazan; Referees: Michail Mertinian, Evangelos Syrepisios (GRE)

28 July 2018; 16:40	Denmark	2–0	Russia	Beach Sports Complex, Kazan; Referees: Pablo Martínez, Luiz Monico (URU)
28 July 2018; 16:40	(18–12, 19–10); Report			Beach Sports Complex, Kazan; Referees: Pablo Martínez, Luiz Monico (URU)

=== Semifinals ===
28 July 2018; 18:20	Brazil	0–2	Norway	Beach Sports Complex, Kazan; Referees: Laura Buchón-Perea, Patricia del Valle-Encuentra (ESP)
28 July 2018; 18:20	(18–19, 20–22); Report			Beach Sports Complex, Kazan; Referees: Laura Buchón-Perea, Patricia del Valle-Encuentra (ESP)

28 July 2018; 20:00	Spain	1–2	Greece	Beach Sports Complex, Kazan; Referees: Ana Carina Barbosa, Nadia Machado (POR)
28 July 2018; 20:00	(18–14, 16–18, 2–6); Report			Beach Sports Complex, Kazan; Referees: Ana Carina Barbosa, Nadia Machado (POR)

=== 15th place game ===
29 July 2018; 09:50	Thailand	2–1	Australia	Beach Sports Complex, Kazan; Referees: Cao Hongjun, Xu Jian (CHN)
29 July 2018; 09:50	(16–12, 10–17, 8–6); Report			Beach Sports Complex, Kazan; Referees: Cao Hongjun, Xu Jian (CHN)

=== 13th place game ===
29 July 2018; 11:30	United States	0–2	Chinese Taipei	Beach Sports Complex, Kazan; Referees: Ana Carina Barbosa, Nadia Machado (POR)
29 July 2018; 11:30	(16–20, 12–24); Report			Beach Sports Complex, Kazan; Referees: Ana Carina Barbosa, Nadia Machado (POR)

=== Eleventh place game ===
29 July 2018; 09:50	France	2–0	Mexico	Beach Sports Complex, Kazan; Referees: Laura Buchón-Perea, Patricia del Valle-Encuentra (ESP)
29 July 2018; 09:50	(18–17, 20–15); Report			Beach Sports Complex, Kazan; Referees: Laura Buchón-Perea, Patricia del Valle-Encuentra (ESP)

=== Ninth place game ===
29 July 2018; 11:30	Vietnam	2–0	Uruguay	Beach Sports Complex, Kazan; Referees: Cao Hongjun, Xu Jian (CHN)
29 July 2018; 11:30	(19–12, 18–16); Report			Beach Sports Complex, Kazan; Referees: Cao Hongjun, Xu Jian (CHN)

=== Seventh place game ===
29 July 2018; 09:50	Russia	2–0	Paraguay	Beach Sports Complex, Kazan; Referees: Ana Carina Barbosa, Nadia Machado (POR)
29 July 2018; 09:50	(20–9, 18–13); Report			Beach Sports Complex, Kazan; Referees: Ana Carina Barbosa, Nadia Machado (POR)

=== Fifth place game ===
29 July 2018; 11:30	Denmark	2–1	Poland	Beach Sports Complex, Kazan; Referees: Laura Buchón-Perea, Patricia del Valle-Encuentra (ESP)
29 July 2018; 11:30	(28–14, 13–14, 6–4); Report			Beach Sports Complex, Kazan; Referees: Laura Buchón-Perea, Patricia del Valle-Encuentra (ESP)

=== Third place game ===
29 July 2018; 15:00	Brazil	2–0	Spain	Beach Sports Complex, Kazan; Referees: Dávid Palkovits, Gabor Szilvási (HUN)
29 July 2018; 15:00	(14–10, 15–10); Report			Beach Sports Complex, Kazan; Referees: Dávid Palkovits, Gabor Szilvási (HUN)

=== Final ===
29 July 2018; 17:00	Norway	1–2	Greece	Beach Sports Complex, Kazan; Referees: Pablo Martínez, Luiz Monico (URU)
29 July 2018; 17:00	(14–18, 24–15, 2–5); Report			Beach Sports Complex, Kazan; Referees: Pablo Martínez, Luiz Monico (URU)

== Final ranking ==
Rank	Team
1st place, gold medalist(s)	Greece
2nd place, silver medalist(s)	Norway
3rd place, bronze medalist(s)	Brazil
4	Spain
5	Denmark
6	Poland
7	Russia
8	Paraguay
9	Vietnam
10	Uruguay
11	France
12	Mexico
13	Chinese Taipei
14	United States
15	Thailand
16	Australia

== Awards ==
MVP

- (Brazil) Juliana Oliveira

Topscorer

- (Mexico) Edna Uresti (123 points)

All-star team

- Goalkeeper: (Greece) Magdalini Kepesidou
- Right wing: (Brazil) Patricia Scheppa
- Left wing: (Norway) Maren Nyland Aardahl
- Pivot: (Spain) Maria Batista
- Defender: (Norway) Elisabeth Hammerstad
- Specialist: (Greece) Vasiliki Skara

Fair play award

- Norway
