= International Meal Company =

Brazilian holding company

International Meal Company Holdings S.A.
- Type: Sociedade Anônima
- Traded as: B3: MEAL3
- Industry: Restaurants
- Founded: 2006
- Headquarters: São Paulo, Brazil
- Key people: Francisco Javier Gavilán Martin, (Chairman)
- Products: Foodservice
- Revenue: ▲US$ 1.0 billion (2017)
- Net income: ▲US$ 1.1 million (2017)
- Number of employees: 25,000
- Website: www.internationalmealcompany.com

International Meal Company (IMC) is a Brazilian holding company in the food service sector operating fast food restaurants. It was founded in 2006 by Advent International and operates 386 restaurants with approximately 14,000 employees in Brazil, Colombia, Mexico, Panama, Puerto Rico and Dominican Republic. The company's restaurant brands include Viena, Frango Assado, Wraps, Go Fresh, Brunella, Gino's and Airports Concepts/Airport Shoppes.

The company's main competitors are Brazilian Fast Food Corporation and the Mexican company Alsea. International Meal Company has been listed on the B3 since 2011.

== Subsidiaries ==
- Airport Concepts (also known as Airports Shoppes) is an IMC company that operates different brands of restaurants in airports. The subsidiary operates as Airport Concepts in seven Brazilian airports and as Airports Shoppes in Mexico and the Caribbean.
- Brunella is a chain of seven restaurants, six in São Paulo and one in Santos.
- Frango Assado is a restaurant chain along roads and the eateries operate 24 hours per day, 7 days per week. Food and baked goods are offered.
- Go Fresh is natural food restaurant with three locations in São Paulo.
- Viena is a network of more than 100 restaurants. It was founded in 1975 and has locations in the main shopping centers in Brazil as well as at airports and food courts on highways in São Paulo, Rio de Janeiro, Brasília and cities with high income per capita in southern Brazil such as Curitiba.
- Wraps is a Brazilian restaurant chain with eight locations in São Paulo and one in Rio de Janeiro.
