= France women's national beach handball team =

France

Information
- Association: French Handball Federation
- Coach: Valérie Nicolas

Colours
Home	Away

Results

World Championship
- Appearances: 1 (First in 2018)
- Best result: 11th (2018)
- Last updated on Unknown.

The France women's national beach handball team is the national team of France. It takes part in international beach handball competitions.

== World Championships results ==
- 2018 – 11th place

== European Championships results ==
- 2017 – 7th place
- 2019 – 13th place
- 2021 – 12th place
