= Reality After Midnight =

Studio album by William C. Woxlin
- Released: May 31, 2008 Digital Download: December 17, 2008 December 17, 2008
- Recorded: William Digital Production Studios, Borlänge, Sweden May 2007 - May 2008
- Genre: Synthpop, electropop
- Label: Weejay Records
- Producer: William C. Woxlin; Steve Kitch

William C. Woxlin chronology
Hugsjón (2007)	Reality After Midnight (2008)

Singles from Reality After Midnight
- 1. "Party as if you were Lindsay Lohan" Released: January 23, 2008; 2. "Celebrity" Released: October 29, 2008; 3. "Devil May Care" Released: August 20, 2009

Professional ratings
Review scores
Source	Rating
Metica	3/5 stars
Borlänge Tidning	2/5 stars
Joyzine	3/5 stars

Reality After Midnight is the seventh album by William C. Woxlin. According to William C. Woxlin the album is a concept album revolving around a man's life in a big city where he've to battle with drugs, alcohol and parties.

For this album William combined influences from his ex-group Sywnthkrawft, with his more ambient projects. This is also the first album to feature vocals by William C. Woxlin.

Since William's change of name (from 'William Johansson' to 'William C. Woxlin') this album will be released under his new name during the spring of 2009.

== Overview ==
During the peak of Williams band Sywnthkrawft he started to write songs for a third album. But after their announcement of an indefinite hiatus William decided to make a new solo album. The first recording sessions started in May 2007 with the whole group; but later William discharged Gustav Jacobsson and Viktor Jacobsson from the project and recorded the album by himself. The final album contains 16 song from sessions made during a one-year period. Some of the songs were meant to turn up on the third Sywnthkrawft album (named "SK3 - The Space Musical"). Some of the outtakes are known: Outtakes from the Sywnthkrawft sessions:

1. "Perpetual Motion at Last" - Played during a few of Sywnthkrawfts last concerts
2. "Hail Your Old Man"
3. "Massive Retaliation of your Heart"
4. "Last Night as the Gang"
5. "First Class Ticket to the Center of the Universe" - was remade for Reality After Midnight and became "Hyperdestination"
6. "Cindy's Confession" - became "Cosmic Confessions" on Reality After Midnight
7. "Bon Voyage" - turned up, remade, on Reality After Midnight

Outtakes from William C. Woxlins solo sessions:

1. "Beyond Infinity" (Instrumental)
2. "Tellus" (Instrumental)
3. "Magic"
4. "Emerald"
5. "The Ferry Cometh"

Also the song "Party as if you were Lindsay Lohan" were recorded and released by Sywnthkrawft (as their last single), and later a remade version became the first single of Reality After Midnight. The last single of the album, Devil May Care (featuring Tess), was released on August 20 on Spotify.

== Track listing ==
All songs by William C. Woxlin

1. "Bon Voyage (Jetset Dreams)" - 02:41
2. "Reality After Midnight" - 03:05
3. "The Dominant Hotel Guest" - 02:36
4. "Integrity" - 02:32
5. "Stalker" - 04:06
6. "Step by Step" - 02:28
7. "Devil May Care" - 03:27
8. "Celebrity" - 03:25
9. "The Decisive Dance" - 04:07
10. "Party as if you were Lindsay Lohan" - 03:06
11. "Euphoric Exhaustion" - 03:40
12. "Trip to the Moon" - 04:14
13. "Hyperdestination" - 02:30
14. "On the Edge of Helplessness" - 06:22
15. "Reborn Starchild" - 03:16
16. "Cosmic Confessions" - 03:53

== Credits ==
- William C. Woxlin - Synthesizers, Vocals
- Produced by William C. Woxlin & Steve Kitch
- Recorded at William Digital Production Studios, Borlänge
- Cover: William C. Woxlin
- Design: William C. Woxlin
