= Thyresis =

- Origin: João Pessoa, Paraíba, Brazil
- Genres: Melodic death metal
- Years active: 2006–present
- Label: Independent
- Members: Victor Hugo Targino; Danilo Rufino; Eduardo Borsero; Demetrius Pedrosa
- Past members: Andrei Targino; Josué "Kain" de Queiróz; João Pachá
- Website: Official Facebook

Thyresis is a Brazilian melodic death metal band formed in 2006 in João Pessoa, Paraíba. Thyresis is now composed of Victor Hugo Targino on bass and vocals, Eduardo Borsero (also in Soturnus) and Danilo Rufino on guitars and Demetrius Pedrosa (also in Metacrose) on drums.

== History ==
=== Formation and first demo (2006-2008) ===
Thyresis was formed in 2006 in João Pessoa, Brazil, by Josué "Kain" de Queiroz (vocals), Danilo Rufino (guitars) and brothers Andrei Targino (guitars) and Victor Hugo Targino (bass). The group started writing songs together around the same time band Soturnus was looking for a new guitarist, intending to record its first album, When Flesh Becomes Spirit; Andrei auditioned to join the band and shortly after starting recording the album, left Thyresis. He was replaced by João Pachá (ex-Befamal, ex-Madness Factory, ex-Dissidium, ex-Rest In Disgrace) in 2007, year the band started recording its first demo entitled Journey Beyond Infinity, released in January 2008. Shortly before the release of the demo, drummer Demetrius Pedrosa (Metacrose, ex-Dissidium) joined the band and they went on a small local tour, playing in local concerts and festivals, such as the tenth edition of Brazilian festival Forcaos, in Fortaleza, Ceará, with bands such as Krisiun and The Ordher, and third edition of Aumenta Que É Rock, in João Pessoa, with band Torture Squad as headliner. That same year, singer Josué left the band for personal reasons, and bassist Victor Hugo took the position.

=== First album (2009-2011) ===
In 2009, João Pachá left the band and moved to Germany to continue his work with his other band, Rest In Disgrace. Shortly after, Thyresis started the production of its first album, unnamed at the time. Produced and mixed by bassist and singer Victor Hugo, the album, later entitled Thyresis, took around two years to be complete and released, and it was mastered by Swedish producer Jens Bogren at Fascionation Street Studios, in Örebro, Sweden. After the recordings were done, in January 2011, the band was again complete with guitarist Eduardo Borsero, from Soturnus.

== Musical style, influences and lyrical themes ==
Thyresis' style consists of a fusion between melodic death metal, thrash metal, and traditional heavy metal. Influenced by bands such as In Flames, At The Gates, Dark Tranquillity, but also Iron Maiden, Metallica and Blind Guardian, Thyresis frontman Victor Hugo Targino says power metal plays an important role in the band's sound as well. Their lyrical themes usually revolves around internal struggles and critiques to society and politics.

== Band members ==
Current members

- Victor Hugo Targino - bass, vocals (2006-)
- Danilo Rufino - guitars (2006-)
- Eduardo Borsero - guitars (2011-)
- Demetrius Pedrosa - drums (2007-)

Former members

- Andrei Targino - guitars (2006-2007)
- Josué "Kain" de Queiroz - vocals (2006-2008)
- João Paulo Pachá Namy - guitars (2007-2009)

== Discography ==
- Thyresis (2011)
