= Thyresis (album) =

Studio album by Thyresis
- Released: 2011
- Genre: Melodic death metal
- Producer: Victor Hugo Targino

Thyresis is the debut studio album by Brazilian melodic death metal band Thyresis, released in 2011. It is a concept album portraying a collective of thoughts and ideas about the world and society. According to the band's bassist and singer, the name of the band and the album is also explained in the concept.

== Concept ==
"The concept of the album revolves around an organization of ideas about the world based on our (and mostly mine) personal experiences. I wanted to take part of what I felt and lived, and expose it as a critique, but in a positive way, with the intention of overcoming hard times.
Not only that, we chose to write a conceptual album to sort of explain the meaning of the word Thyresis, resulting in a way of facing life based on the overcoming of barriers, and not only a shallow name with no meaning."

—Victor Hugo Targino

== Track listing ==
I: Silence Feels No Hold

1. "Silent Monologue" (instrumental) - 1:20
2. "Journey" - 5:48

II: Once Silent Voices Of Mine

1. "Refugee" (instrumental) - 1:38
2. "Voices Of Me" - 3:44
3. "Dispersed" - 4:45

III: Silence Feeds No Hope

1. "Broken Home" (instrumental) - 1:19
2. "A Dead Resource" - 5:04
3. "Beyond Infinity" - 5:32
4. "The Ties Of Ignorance" - 4:23

IV: Thy Resistance

1. "Inside" (instrumental) - 1:10
2. "Strength Within" - 5:27
3. "Thyresis" (instrumental) - 6:07

V: Silence Fills No Hole

1. "Still Alive" - 6:38
2. "Risen" - 4:44
3. "Silent Scream" (instrumental) - 3:16

Notes

- Track 6 and track 12, "Broken Home" and "Thyresis", respectively, features a speech by American serial killer Charles Milles Manson.
- All lyrics and texts written by Victor Hugo Targino, except 4 and 9 written by Josué "Kain" de Queiróz.

== Personnel ==
- Victor Hugo Targino - bass, lead vocals, guitars
- Danilo Rufino - guitars
- Eduardo Borsero - guitars
- Demetrius Pedrosa - drums
- Victor Hugo Targino - producer, mixing, engineering
- Marcelo Macedo - drums engineering
- Paulinho "Tazz" - drums engineering
- Arthur Ferraz - vocal engineering
- Jens Bogren - Mastering
- Rafael F.S. - Artwork
- Rodolfo Salgueiro - Band photos
