= Dominican Republic women's national beach handball team =

Dominican Republic

Information
- Association: Federacion Dominicana de Balonmano

Colours
Home	Away

Results

World Championship
- Appearances: 2 (First in 2006)
- Best result: 11th (2008)
- Last updated on Unknown.

The Dominican Republic women's national beach handball team is the national team of the Dominican Republic. It is governed by the Dominican Republic Handball Federation and takes part in international beach handball competitions.

The team participated at the 2006 Beach Handball World Championships held in Copacabana, Brazil.

== World Championships results ==
- 2006 – 10th place
- 2008 – 11th place

== Other competitions results ==
- 2022 Central American and Caribbean Beach Games – 4th place
