= Yahoo (band) =

- Origin: Brazil
- Genres: Hard rock, pop rock, AOR
- Years active: 1988–1996, 2006–present
- Members: Zé Henrique; Serginho Knust; Val Martins; Marcelão
- Past members: Robertinho de Recife; Marcelo Azevedo

Yahoo is a Brazilian rock band formed in 1988.

== History ==
Yahoo was founded in 1988 by guitarist Robertinho do Recife. It was fairly successful in Brazil during the 1990s by playing cover versions of other bands' hard rock songs translated to Portuguese. Many of their songs were also used in soundtracks of telenovelas.

Their self-titled debut album, Yahoo, had the Def Leppard's hit "Love Bites" translated as "Mordidas de Amor", and was used in the soundtrack of the telenovela Bebê a Bordo.

The next album, Oração da Vitória ("Victory Prayer"), brought them another hit, "Anjo" (cover of Aerosmith's "Angel"), again used in a telenovela, O Sexo dos Anjos.

In 1990, Yahoo released the album Yahoo 3. It was not as successful as the previous ones, but two songs, "Veneno" ("Poison") and "Somos a Luz da Manhã" ("We are the Morning Light"), were used in the soundtrack of a movie, Sonho de Verão.

Yahoo released the album Pára-Raio in 1992, with several cover songs, such as "Pára-Raio" ("Lightning Rod", a version of "Hide You Heart" by Kiss) and "Como o Vento" ("Like the Wind", a version of "Wind of Change" by Scorpions); the song "Paixão Esquecida" ("Forgotten Passion") was again used in a telenovela, Deus nos Acuda.

Their 1994 album, Caminhos de Sol ("Paths of the Sun") was more successful, with "Caminhos de Sol" used in the telenovela A Viagem and becoming a huge hit.

In 1996, not long after the release of Arquivo, the band dissolves, and the members turn their attention to a new business: they set the Yahoo Studio, in Rio de Janeiro, which would be one of the most popular recording studios in Brazil.

In 2006, they release a new album, Versões ("Versions"), consisting only of translated versions of songs by artists such as Journey, Kiss, and Poison.

== Members ==
=== Current line-up ===
- Zé Henrique - bass guitar and vocals
- Serginho Knust - guitar, acoustic guitar and vocals
- Val Martins - keyboard and vocals
- Marcelão - drums and vocals

=== Former members ===
- Robertinho de Recife (1988–1990) - guitar and vocals
- Marcello Azevedo (1988–1993) - keyboard, guitar and vocals

== Discography ==
- 1988 - Yahoo
- 1989 - Oração da Vitória
- 1990 - Yahoo 3
- 1992 - Pára-Raio
- 1994 - Caminhos de Sol
- 1996 - Arquivo
- 2006 - Versões
- 2008 - Yahoo 20 Anos - Ao Vivo
