= Elena Oetling =

Mexican sailor

Personal information
- Full name: Elena Oetling Ramírez
- Nationality: Mexico
- Born: 18 April 1993 (age 33) Chapala, Jalisco, Mexico
- Height: 1.73 m (5 ft 8 in)

Sailing career
- Sport: Sailing
- Club: Vallarta Yacht Club
- Coached by: Giorgio Elena
- Class: Dinghy

Elena Oetling Ramírez (Note: In this Spanish name, the first or paternal surname is Oetling and the second or maternal family name is Ramírez.) (born 18 April 1993) is a Mexican sailor, who specialized in the Laser Radial class. She finished fifth in her signature class at the 2019 Pan American Games in Lima and was eventually named the country's top female sailor in the single-handed dinghy at the rescheduled 2020 Summer Olympics in Tokyo, sitting distantly in the thirty-second spot. While sailing competitively for the Mexican squad, Oetling trained for the Games at the Vallarta Yacht Club under her personal coach Giorgio Elena.

Oetling competed for the Mexican sailing squad in the women's Laser Radial class at the rescheduled 2020 Summer Olympics in Tokyo. Building up to her Olympic selection, she posted a quintet of marks higher than the tenth position to lock the North American spot over a talented field of Laser Radial sailors at the 2020 Sailing World Cup regatta in Miami, Florida, United States. Oetling spent the first half of the series outside the top twenty before climbing to seventh place in the sixth race. Despite that result, Oetling finished 32nd overall with 221 net points.
