= 2006 Beach Handball World Championships =

International handball competition

The 2006 Beach Handball World Championships are a ten-team tournament in both men's and women's beach handball, held in the Petrobras Arena at Copacabana beach in Rio de Janeiro, Brazil between 15 November and 19 November. This is the second edition of the event. Matches are played in sets, the team that wins two sets is the winner of a match. When teams are equal in points the head-to-head result is decisive. Brazil win the championship gold medal in both genders.

== Men ==
=== Group A ===
Team	Pts	Pld	W	L	SW	SL
Croatia	6	4	3	1	6	4
Spain	6	4	3	1	7	2
Hungary	4	4	2	2	5	5
Bahrain	2	4	1	3	2	7
Russia	2	4	1	3	4	6

November 15, 2006

Spain	2–0	Bahrain
Russia	0–2	Spain
Bahrain	0–2	Hungary
Croatia	0–2	Russia

November 16, 2006

Hungary	1–2	Croatia
Bahrain	2–1	Russia
Russia	1–2	Hungary
Croatia	2–1	Spain

November 17, 2006

Hungary	0–2	Spain
Bahrain	0–2	Croatia

=== Group B ===
Team	Pts	Pld	W	L	SW	SL
Turkey	8	4	4	0	8	3
Egypt	6	4	3	1	7	3
Germany	4	4	2	2	6	4
Brazil	2	4	1	3	3	6
Dominican Republic	0	4	0	4	0	8

November 15, 2006

Dominican Republic	0–2	Egypt
Brazil	1–2	Turkey
Dominican Republic	0–2	Germany
Brazil	0–2	Egypt

November 16, 2006

Germany	1–2	Turkey
Turkey	2–0	Dominican Republic
Germany	1–2	Egypt
Brazil	2–0	Dominican Republic

November 17, 2006

Egypt	1–2	Turkey
Brazil	0–2	Germany

=== Quarter finals ===
November 17, 2006

Spain	2–0	Germany
Turkey	2–0	Bahrain
Egypt	2–0	Hungary
Croatia	0–2	Brazil

=== 9th / 10th position ===
November 18, 2006

Russia	2–0	Dominican Republic

=== 5th to 8th position ===
November 18, 2006

Croatia	0–2	Hungary
Bahrain	2–1	Germany

=== 7th / 8th position ===
November 18, 2006

Croatia	2–1	Germany

=== 5th / 6th position ===
November 18, 2006

Hungary	2–1	Bahrain

=== Semi finals ===
November 18, 2006

Brazil	2–1	Egypt
Turkey	2–0	Spain

=== 3rd / 4th position ===
November 19, 2006

Egypt	1–2	Spain

=== Final ===
November 19, 2006

Brazil	2–0	Turkey

=== Awards ===
Topscorer

- Juan Antonio Vázquez (ESP)

All-star team

- Ibrahim Demir (TUR)
- Amer Abd El Fattah (EGY)
- Abdulla Ali (BHR)
- Hrvoje Biuklic (CRO)
- Bruno Carlos de Oliveira (BRA)
- Said Hamed Saud (OMN)

== Women ==
=== Group A ===
Team	Pts	Pld	W	L	SW	SL
Germany	8	4	4	0	8	1
Hungary	6	4	3	1	6	2
Italy	4	4	2	2	4	5
Croatia	2	4	1	3	4	6
Dominican Republic	0	4	0	4	0	8

November 15, 2006

Germany	2–0	Italy
Dominican Republic	0–2	Hungary
Croatia	1–2	Italy
Dominican Republic	0–2	Germany

November 16, 2006

Hungary	2–0	Croatia
Croatia	2–0	Dominican Republic
Germany	2–0	Hungary
Italy	2–0	Dominican Republic

November 17, 2006

Croatia	1–2	Germany
Italy	0–2	Hungary

=== Group B ===
Team	Pts	Pld	W	L	SW	SL
Brazil	8	4	4	0	8	0
Russia	6	4	3	1	6	3
Bulgaria	4	4	2	2	4	4
Turkey	2	4	1	3	2	6
Uruguay	0	4	0	4	1	8

November 15, 2006

Bulgaria	0–2	Russia
Uruguay	1–2	Russia
Turkey	0–2	Bulgaria
Uruguay	0–2	Brazil

November 16, 2006

Uruguay	0–2	Turkey
Brazil	2–0	Russia
Uruguay	0–2	Bulgaria
Brazil	2–0	Turkey

November 17, 2006

Bulgaria	0–2	Brazil
Turkey	0–2	Russia

=== Quarter finals ===
November 17, 2006

Hungary	1–2	Bulgaria
Germany	2–0	Turkey
Brazil	2–1	Croatia
Russia	2–0	Italy

=== 9th / 10th position ===
November 18, 2006

Uruguay	2–0	Dominican Republic

=== 5th to 8th position ===
November 18, 2006

Croatia	2–1	Hungary
Turkey	2–0	Italy

=== 7th / 8th position ===
November 18, 2006

Italy	0–2	Hungary

=== 5th / 6th position ===
November 18, 2006

Turkey	2–1	Croatia

=== Semi finals ===
November 18, 2006

Germany	2–0	Russia
Brazil	2–1	Bulgaria

=== 3rd / 4th position ===
November 19, 2006

Russia	2–0	Bulgaria

=== Final ===
November 19, 2006

Brazil	2–0	Germany

=== Awards ===
Topscorer

- Željka Vidović (CRO)

All-star team

- Jerusa Ferreira Dias (BRA)
- Edna Márcia Costa (BRA)
- Natalia Sokirkina (RUS)
- Katarina Hartenstein (GER)
- Simona Zaprianova (BUL)
