= William C. Woxlin =

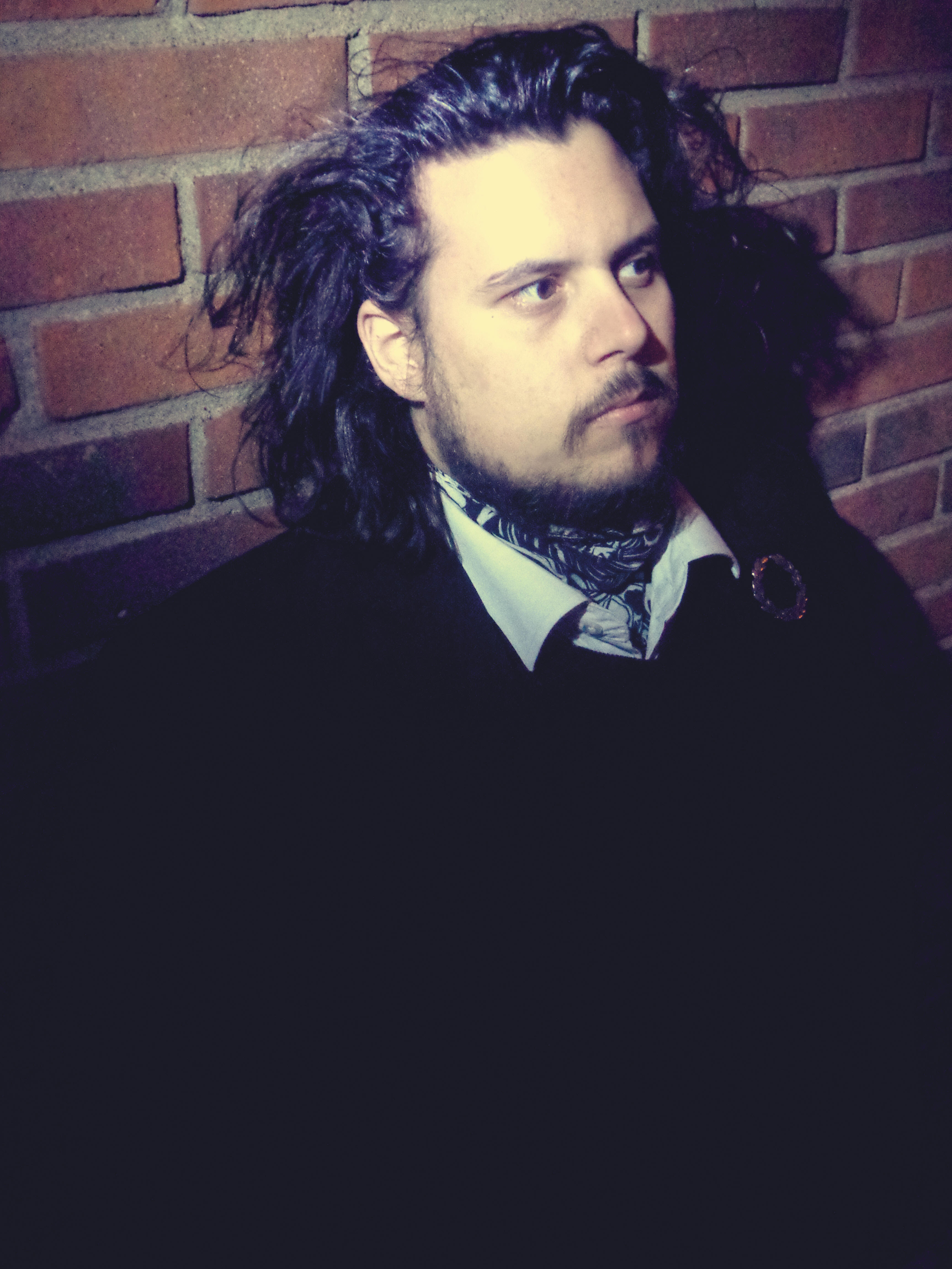
- Woxlin in 2014

Background information
- Born: Peder William Christopher Woxlin; 21 January 1988 (age 38)
- Origin: Borlänge, Dalarna, Sweden
- Genres: Synth, Synthpop, Minimal, Ambient, Electropop
- Occupations: Artist/Composer; Actor; Playwright; Author; Poet; Director; Academic
- Instruments: Synthesizer; Vocals; Piano
- Years active: 1994–present
- Formerly of: Sywnthkrawft (2005–2007); Borlange All-Stars (2004–2006); DJ WeeJay (2002–2005); Super Synth Farmacia (1998–2002, 2005)

Peder William Christopher Woxlin Chiappe Johansson (born 21 January 1988) is a Swedish author, playwright, director, actor, academic, and composer. He mostly creates music in the minimalist & synth genre. In late 2010, Woxlin, became the editor-in-chief and board member at Dalarnas Författarförbund (The Dalecarlean Authors Society of Sweden).

== Career ==
He started out as a solo pianist in 1994 (then 6 years old) playing at different events and later he started to take piano lessons. Later he became a part of Super Synth Farmacia, a group which made songs on computers and toy keyboards, later in 2002 they disbanded. He was also a member in a music collective called Borlange All-Stars. In 2006 Borlange All-Stars disbanded because they couldn't find anything more to express through their music. In 2008 he released his new solo album, Reality After Midnight, after working with it for almost one year; it was later released on iTunes. The last single of the album, Devil May Care, featured Tess and was released on Spotify, 20 August 2009.

About his work as a director he've commented that: "As a director you have to dignify the playwrights' script and also express your own artistic expression on the stage [...] and also not constrain the actors in their progress."

=== Sywnthkrawft ===
In 2005 Woxlin decided to create the band Sywnthkrawft together with Gustav Jacobsson, Viktor Jacobsson and Daniel Thyberg. Between 2005 and 2007, they released three albums and three singles.

Although their initial sound was ambient inspired, Sywnthkrawft soon switched to a more instrumental synthpop influenced sound. They gained some success with the single, The Photographer's Exceptional Pictures for Body and Mind. On 8 March 2007, it debuted on #1 on the Swedish chart Dalatoppen and held its position for 7 weeks. Their last album, Goodbye, Spaceblade (Re-recorded), were released only weeks before they embarked on a hiatus even though a new album (SK3 – The Space Musical) were in production and planned for a 2008 release.

While never formally breaking up, after Goodbye, Spaceblade (Re-recorded), Woxlin decided to concentrate on his solo project. As time went by Woxlin increasingly dismissed the possibility of reforming the band.

=== Writing career ===
==== Mannen som fanns överallt ====
In February 2011, his first collection of haikupoems, "Mannen som fanns överallt", was released. The book received positive reviews and it was said that: "he could be likened to a haikupoet with a good sense of portraying beauty in a tormented world". As a poet he has been compared with Bruno K. Öijer.

==== Det Kolossala Svampmolnet ====
Det Kolossala Svampmolnet (The Colossal Mushroom Cloud) is Woxins first postmodern collection of short stories. It received mixed to positive reviews. The collection revolves around the destruction of Earth by an impact event, some stories are only one sentence long and others are several pages. One reviewer noted that the collection was absurdist and broke the borders between incomprehensible nightmares and daily routines. It was also praised for its dark and brutal comedy and inconvenience. The themes was also described as despairing, nightmarish, dystopian, satirical and anguished. Also, some reviewers started to doubt that the impending doom was real or just a construct of the mind by the characters. The collection was compared to Lars Von Triers movie Melancholia, Ray Bradbury and H.C. Andersen. Another reviewer commented that the collection was wayard but too fragmental and complex. Additional to this one reviewer criticized the length of the collection.

Woxlin have said that the collection was inspired by such writers as Augusto Monterroso, László Krasznahorkai, Samuel Beckett and Sławomir Mrożek. But also by the theory of the five stages of grief by psychiatrist Elisabeth Kübler-Ross and his own nightmares.

=== Stage and theatre career ===
==== 69 - Det Stora Svenska Rymdprojektet ====
In 2007 he was announced to be the playwright and director for the Academic Student Theatre of Dalarna, His first major production was his musical called "69: Det Stora Svenska Rymdprojektet - en riktig metamorfos" (69: The Big Swedish Spaceproject – A true metamorphosis) and revolved around the Moon landing, made in 1969. The musical featured Hans Villius as a narrator. "69: Det Stora Svenska Rymdprojektet – en riktig metamorfos" received positive reviews. One reviewer compared it to the works of the Swedish comedy group Galenskaparna & After Shave and wrote that the musical was "insanely funny". Beside the screenplay and directing Woxlin was also praised for his acting and singing skills.

==== Lite råare - känsliga människor undanbedes ====
In 2013 he directed and acted in the comical revue Lite råare - känsliga människor undanbedes, written by Anders Nohrstedt. This is one of many collaborations between Nohrstedt and Woxlin, last time on a theatre production was in 2008 with Woxlins musical "69: Det Stora Svenska Rymdprojektet – en riktig metamorfos" where Nohrstedt played one of the main characters. The production received positive reviews. One critic noted that the revue was provocative and addressed controversial issues such as politics, religion and the Fritzl case.

==== Out of Order ====
In 2014 he directed the 1991 Laurence Olivier Award for Best New Comedy play Out of Order by Ray Cooney together with Linda Byman. Woxlin praised Cooney for the pacing and the confused type of comedy of the play. The play got positive reviews. Byman praised Woxlin for his visions and said that it was the best play they've made. Woxlin praised the actors and said that he enjoyed to work with all of them. He also mentioned that the opening night was a huge success.

==== Lite råare 2 - gnälliga människor undanbedes ====
In 2014 Woxlin will direct and star in Anders Nohrstedts new revue Lite råare 2 - gnälliga människor undanbedes. The new revue is following the same thematics as the last revue but is more surrealistic. . This time the revue will address controversial themes like racism, domestic violence and pedophilia. In an interview Woxlin commented that: "When you make jokes about these themes you can not be indelicate and you should have a purpose with it: why do we make jokes about this? Is it just because it is provocative or do we have an ulterior motive? I think this is important when you make jokes about themes that are considered to be taboo." This is one of many collaborations between Nohrstedt and Woxlin. Woxlin concluded in the same interview that they work well together and are each other's Don Quixote and Sancho Panza.

==== Waiting for Godot ====
In 2014 Woxlin will direct and star as Pozzo in nobel laureate Samuel Becketts play Waiting for Godot.

== Personal life ==
During 2010, Woxlin finalized his thesis (bachelor's degree), in business and management, called "Perspektiv på HR-arbete vid nedskärningar – en studie om effekter och handlingar, utifrån tre perspektiv, för den fortsatta överlevnaden", receiving bachelor of science in business administration and management.

== Discography ==
=== Solo ===
- La Sélection de William Johansson (1997)
- Post Inferno Soundtrack (2005)
- Reincarnation (2006)
- Contempt of Death (2006)
- The Eternal Struggle (2006)
- Hugsjón (2007)
- Reality After Midnight (2008)

Singles

- Millennium (2005)
- Freakshow (2005)
- Andromeda's Christmas Eve (2005)
- Post Inferno (2006)
- Inscrutable Inhumation of the Apocalypse (2006)
- The Path of Schweden (2006)
- 060606 (2006)
- Party as if you were Lindsay Lohan (2008)
- Celebrity (2008)
- Devil May Care (2009)

EP

- 4 Pianokompositioner (1995)
- Stehplatz.81 (2005)

=== With Sywnthkrawft ===
- Cornea (2006)
- Goodbye, Spaceblade (2007)

== Bibliography ==
=== Major works ===
- Tänk om vi är de enda som vaknar (What if we're the only one who will awake), lyrics, 2003
- Möte i Parken (Meeting at the Park), play, 2004
- 69 Det Stora Svenska Rymdprojektet (The Big Swedish Spaceproject), play, 2007
- Perspektiv på HR-Arbete – en studie om effekter och handlingar, utifrån tre perspektiv, för den fortsatta överlevnaden, thesis, Sweden 2010 (ISBN 978-1-4538-9629-7)
- Mannen som fanns överallt (The man who was everywhere), poetry collection, Sweden 2011 (ISBN 978-91-979341-0-7)
- Det Kolossala Svampmolnet (The Colossal Mushroom Cloud), short story collection, 2013 (ISBN 978-91-980140-1-3)
- Månen närmar sig (The Moon is approaching), play, 2015

=== Minor works ===
- Arkipelag (Archipelago), long poem, Sweden 2010
- Livsindustriverk (Lifeindustrialplant), long poem, Sweden 2011 (ISBN 978-91-979341-3-8)
- T101a 6486 kHz, experimental book, 2011 (ISBN 978-91-979341-7-6)

=== Selected books in translation ===
- Towards Nadir: Selected poems, 2012
- Hacia Nadir, 2012

=== As editor ===
- Dalaröster 8. Ordstorm : antologi, 2012

== Major stage productions ==
Year	Production	Director	Writer	Actor	Other	Notes
2003	Möte i Parken	Yes	Yes	Yes	Yes	
2005	Den starkare	Yes		Yes		written by August Strindberg
2006	Majakovskij: Ett moln i byxor	Yes		Yes		written by Vladimir Mayakovsky
2007	Villon: Det Stora Testamentet	Yes		Yes		written by François Villon
2008	69 Det Stora Svenska Rymdprojektet - en riktig metamorfos	Yes	Yes	Yes	Yes	
2013	Lite råare - känsliga människor undanbedes	Yes		Yes		
2013	Mistero Buffo	Yes		Yes		written by Dario Fo
2014	Out of order	Yes				written by Ray Cooney
2014	Lite Råare 2 - gnälliga människor undanbedes	Yes		Yes		
2014	Kolosserna : 4 monologer om överlevnad	Yes	Yes	Yes		
2014	Waiting for Godot	Yes		Yes		written by Samuel Beckett
2015	It runs in the family	Yes				written by Ray Cooney
2015	Månen närmar sig	Yes	Yes			written by William C. Woxlin
2016	At Sea	Yes				written by Sławomir Mrożek
