= Mexico women's national beach handball team =

Mexico

Information
- Association: Mexican Handball Federation
- Coach: Miguel Contreras

Colours
Home	Away

Results

World Championship
- Appearances: 1 (First in 2018)
- Best result: 12th (2018)
- Last updated on Unknown.

The Mexico women's national beach handball team is the national team of Mexico. It takes part in international beach handball competitions.

== World Championships results ==
- 2018 – 12th place
- 2022 – 15th place

== Other competitions results ==
- 2022 Central American and Caribbean Beach Games –
- 2023 IHF Beach Handball Global Tour Round 1 - 4th
