= 2022 Central American and Caribbean Beach Games =

International multi-sport event

- Emblem of the 2022 Central American and Caribbean Beach Games
- Nations: 26
- Athletes: 544
- Events: 38 in 10 sports
- Opening: 19 November 2022
- Closing: 26 November 2022
- Opened by: President Gustavo Petro
- Torch lighter: Rafael Acosta Rodríguez
- Ceremony venue: Parque Deportivo El Rodadero
- Website: santamarta2022.com

The 2022 Central American and Caribbean Beach Games (Spanish: Juegos Centroamericanos y de Caribe de Mar y Playa), officially the I Central American and Caribbean Beach Games, was an international multi-sport event held in Santa Marta, Colombia from November 19–26. It was the first time this event was realised. The games are overseen by Centro Caribe Sports (formerly CACSO).

== Participating teams ==
26 nations and dependencies competed in these Beach Games.

Below is a list of all the participating NOCs. The number of competitors per delegation is indicated in brackets.

Participating National Olympic Committees
- Antigua and Barbuda (3)
- Aruba (2)
- Bahamas (12)
- Barbados (38)
- Cayman Islands (6)
- Colombia (98) (host)
- Costa Rica (16)
- Cuba (14)
- Curaçao (7)
- Dominican Republic (32)
- El Salvador (26)
- Guadeloupe (10)
- Haiti (5)
- Jamaica (2)
- Martinique (7)
- Mexico (70)
- Nicaragua (4)
- Panama (15)
- Puerto Rico (56)
- Saint Kitts and Nevis (2)
- Saint Lucia (4)
- Saint Vincent and the Grenadines (2)
- Suriname (6)
- Trinidad and Tobago (20)
- Virgin Islands (8)
- Venezuela (79)

== Sports ==
- Beach handball ()
- Beach rugby ()
- Beach soccer ()
- Beach tennis ()
- Beach volleyball ()
- Beach wrestling ()
- Open water swimming ()
- Sailing ()
- Skateboarding ()
- Surfing ()

== Medal table ==
* Host nation (Colombia)

2022 Central American and Caribbean Beach Games medal table
Rank	NOC	Gold	Silver	Bronze	Total
1	Venezuela (VEN)	11	11	7	29
2	Puerto Rico (PUR)	9	4	4	17
3	Colombia (COL)*	7	8	5	20
4	Mexico (MEX)	5	6	10	21
5	El Salvador (ESA)	2	0	0	2
6	Cuba (CUB)	1	1	1	3
6	Dominican Republic (DOM)	1	1	1	3
8	Antigua and Barbuda (ATG)	1	0	0	1
8	Aruba (ARU)	1	0	0	1
10	Panama (PAN)	0	4	2	6
11	Barbados (BAR)	0	2	2	4
12	Costa Rica (CRC)	0	1	1	2
13	Guadeloupe (GLP)	0	0	2	2
13	U.S. Virgin Islands (ISV)	0	0	2	2
15	Trinidad and Tobago (TTO)	0	0	1	1
Totals (15 entries)		38	38	38	114
