= Brazilian Fast Food Corporation =

Brazil Fast Food Corporation (BFFC) is a food service holding company in Brazil that includes BFFC do Brasil Participacões, Ltda. It also operated in Angola and Chile. The restaurants and kiosks include company owned operations and franchisees such as Bob's, KFC, Pizza Hut, and Doggis.

The corporate headquarters are at 89 Voluntários da Pátria Road in the Botafogo neighborhood of Rio de Janeiro.
