= Dominican Republic men's national beach handball team =

Dominican Republic

Information
- Association: Dominican Republic Handball Federation

Colours
Home	Away

Results

World Championship
- Appearances: 1 (First in 2006)
- Best result: 10th (2006)
- Last updated on Unknown.

The Dominican Republic national beach handball team is the national team of the Dominican Republic. It is governed by the Dominican Republic Handball Federation and takes part in international beach handball competitions.

During the 2006 Beach Handball World Championships the team finished in 10th place after being defeated by the Russian team 2–0.

== World Championships results ==
- 2006 – 10th place

== Other competitions results ==
- 2022 Central American and Caribbean Beach Games – 5th place

== See also ==
- Dominican Republic men's national handball team
- Dominican Republic women's national handball team
