= Juventus Futebol Clube =

Juventus
- Full name: Juventus Futebol Clube
- Founded: August 11, 2006
- Ground: Estádio João Francisco dos Santos, Rio de Janeiro, Rio de Janeiro state, Brazil
- Capacity: 3,000
- President: Francisco Carlos da Hora
Home colors	Away colors

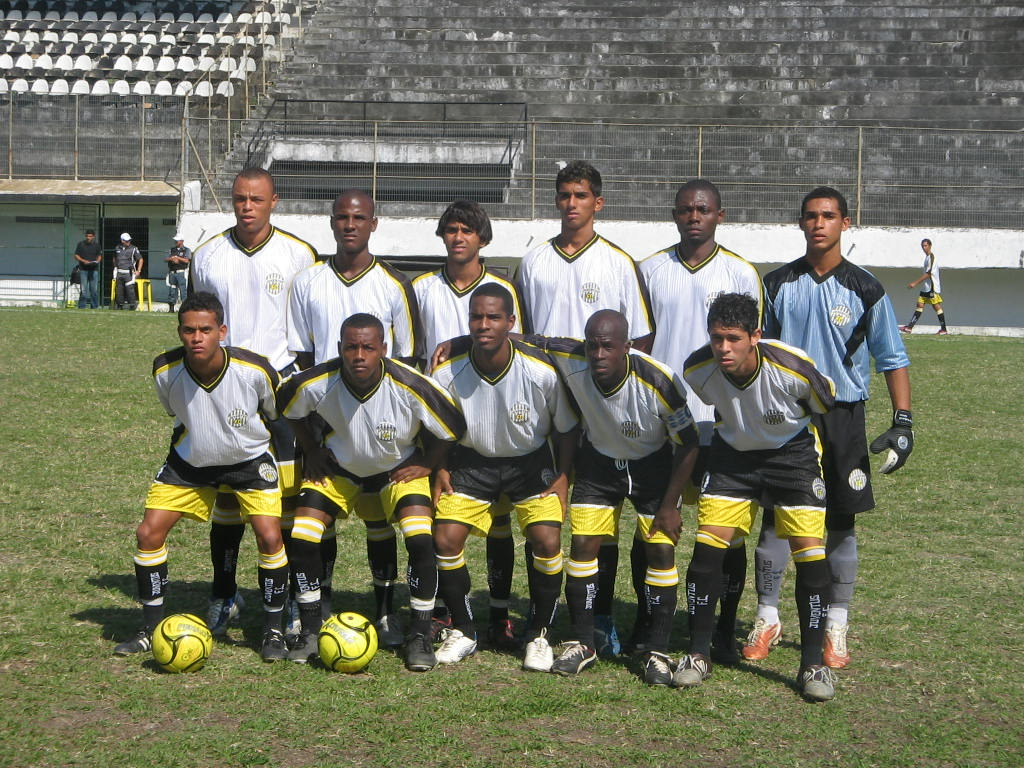
Team photo from the 2007 season

Juventus Futebol Clube, commonly known as Juventus, is a Brazilian football club based in Rio de Janeiro, Rio de Janeiro state, Brazil.

== History ==
The club was founded on August 11, 2006, by Francisco Carlos da Hora, being named after Italian club Juventus Football Club, as it shares the same colors as the club he supports, which is Botafogo de Futebol e Regatas.

== Stadium ==
Juventus Futebol Clube play their home games at Estádio João Francisco dos Santos. The stadium has a maximum capacity of 3,000 people.
