= Oceania Beach Handball Championship =

The Oceania Beach Handball Championship is the official competition for senior national beach handball teams of Oceania region. It was first organized by the Oceania Continent Handball Federation in 2013. In addition to crowning the Oceania champions, the tournament also serves as a qualifying tournament for the World Championships.

== Champions ==
=== Men's division ===
Year	Host	Final			Bronze Match		
Year	Host	Gold	Score	Silver	Bronze	Score	Fourth Place
2013; Details	(Australia); Maroubra Beach, Sydney	Australia	2–0	New Zealand	only two teams entered		
2016; Details	(Australia); Coolangatta, Gold Coast	Australia	2–1	New Zealand	only two teams entered		
2018; Details	Glenelg, South Australia	Australia	2–0	New Zealand	only two teams entered		
2019; Details	Glenelg, South Australia	Australia	2–0	New Zealand	Cook Islands	2–1	American Samoa
2020; Details	(Australia); Coolangatta, Gold Coast	Exhibition Match only. Australia defeated New Zealand 2-0					
2022; Details	(Australia); Coolangatta, Gold Coast	New Zealand	3 matches	Australia	only two teams entered		
2023; Details	(Australia); Coolangatta, Gold Coast	Australia	2–1	New Zealand	Cook Islands	only three teams entered	
2026; Details	Christchurch, New Zealand	Australia	2–0	New Zealand	Cook Islands	2–0	Kiribati

=== Women's division ===
Year	Host	Final			Bronze Match		
Year	Host	Gold	Score	Silver	Bronze	Score	Fourth Place
2013; Details	(Australia); Maroubra Beach, Sydney	Australia	2–0	New Zealand	only two teams entered		
2016; Details	(Australia); Coolangatta, Gold Coast	Australia	2–0	New Zealand	only two teams entered		
2018; Details	Glenelg, South Australia,	Australia	Round robin	American Samoa	New Zealand	only three teams entered	
2019; Details	Glenelg, South Australia	Australia	2-0	American Samoa	New Zealand	2-1	Cook Islands
2020; Details	(Australia); Coolangatta, Gold Coast	Postponed. Scheduled for 20-23 February 2020					
2022; Details	(Australia); Coolangatta, Gold Coast	Australia	3 matches	New Zealand	only two teams entered		
2023; Details	(Australia); Coolangatta, Gold Coast	Australia	2–0	New Zealand	Cook Islands	2–0	American Samoa
2026; Details	Christchurch, New Zealand	Australia	2–0	Cook Islands	New Zealand	2–0	Kiribati

== See also ==
- Oceania Continent Handball Federation
