= Philippines women's national beach handball team =

Sports team in Philippines

Philippines

Information
- Nickname: Amigas (lit. 'Comrades')
- Association: Philippine Handball Federation
- Coach: Joanna Franquelli
- Assistant coach: Simeon Bejar

Colours
| Home | Away |

Results

World Championship
- Appearances: 2 (First in 2024)
- Best result: 12th (2024, 2026)

Asian Championship
- Appearances: 2 (First in 2023)
- Best result: 2nd (2023, 2025)
- Last updated on Unknown.

The Philippines women's national beach handball team is the national team of the Philippines. It takes part in international beach handball competitions and is governed by the Philippine Handball Federation.

The women's national team has participated in the Asian Beach Games, particularly in the 2012 and 2014 editions.

The Philippines have qualified for the IHF Beach Handball World Championships. They secured a berth in the 2024 edition in China by finishing as second placers at the 2023 Asian Beach Handball Championship in Indonesia. They qualified again for the 2026 World Championship by finishing second in the 2025 Asian Championship.

== Results ==
=== Beach Handball World Championships ===
Champions Runners up Third place Fourth place

Beach Handball World Championships
| Year | Round | Position | Pld | W | L | SW | SL | +/- |
|---|---|---|---|---|---|---|---|---|
| (Egypt) 2004 – (Greece) 2022 | Did not enter/qualify | | | | | | | |
| (China) 2024 | Eleventh place game | 12th place | 8 | 2 | 6 | 6 | 12 | −6 |
| (Croatia) 2026 | Eleventh place game | 12th place | 9 | 3 | 6 | 8 | 13 | −5 |
| Total | 0 Titles | – | 17 | 5 | 12 | 14 | 25 | −11 |

=== Asian Beach Handball Championship ===
Champions Runners up Third place Fourth place

Asian Beach Handball Championship
| Year | Round | Position | Pld | W | L | SW | SL | +/- |
|---|---|---|---|---|---|---|---|---|
| (Oman) 2004 | Did not participate | | | | | | | |
| (Hong Kong) 2013 | Did not participate | | | | | | | |
| (Oman) 2015 | Did not participate | | | | | | | |
| (Thailand) 2017 | Did not participate | | | | | | | |
| (China) 2019 | Did not participate | | | | | | | |
| (Thailand) 2022 | Did not participate | | | | | | | |
| (Indonesia) 2023 | Round Robin | 2nd place | 6 | 4 | 2 | 174 | 177 | -3 |
| (Oman) 2025 | Round Robin | 2nd place | 6 | 4 | 2 | | | +27 |
| Total | 0 Titles | 2nd place | 12 | 8 | 6 | | | 24 |

=== Asian Beach Games ===
Champions Runners up Third place Fourth place

Asian Beach Games
| Year | Round | Position | Pld | W | L | SW | SL | +/- |
|---|---|---|---|---|---|---|---|---|
| (Indonesia) 2008 | Did not participate | | | | | | | |
| (Oman) 2010 | Did not participate | | | | | | | |
| (China) 2012 | Group Stage | 10th place | 5 | 0 | 5 | 0 | 10 | -10 |
| (Thailand) 2014 | Group Stage | 9th place | 5 | 1 | 4 | 3 | 8 | -5 |
| (Vietnam) 2016 | Did not participate | | | | | | | |
| Total | 0 Titles | 9th Place | 10 | 1 | 9 | 3 | 18 | -15 |

=== Southeast Asian Beach Handball Championship ===
Champions Runners up Third place Fourth place

Southeast Asian Beach Handball Championship
| Year | Round | Position | Pld | W | L | SW | SL | +/- |
|---|---|---|---|---|---|---|---|---|
| (Philippines) 2017 | Round Robin | 3rd place | - | - | - | - | - | - |
| (Thailand) 2022 | - | - | - | - | - | - | - | - |
| (Thailand) 2025 | - | 3rd place | - | - | - | - | - | - |
| Total | 0 Titles | 3rd Place | - | - | - | - | - | — |

== Team ==
=== Squad ===
Roster for the 2014 Asian Beach Games.

- 1:Katherine May Binamira
- 3: Michelle Bruzola
- 4: Angel Moreno
- 5: Maria Ana Fatima Tolentino
- 6: Aurora Adriano
- 9: Marilourd Socorro Borja
- 11: Mary Angeli Cabochan
- 12: Luzviminda Pacubas
- 13: Legiel Ortencio
- 14: Andrea Johanna Montalbo
- 16: Jennifer Del Villar

=== Coach ===
- (Philippines) Joanna Franquelli (2012–)
