= Australia men's national youth beach handball team =

Australia Youth

Information
- Association: Australian Handball Federation

Colours
Home	Away

Results

Youth Olympic Games
- Appearances: 0

World Championship
- Appearances: 1 (First in 2017)
- Best result: 10th (2017)

Oceania Youth Beach Handball Championship
- Appearances: 1 (First in 2017)
- Best result: 1st
- Last updated on 7 January 2020.

The Australia national youth beach handball team is the national Under 17 team of Australia. It is governed by the Australian Handball Federation and takes part in international beach handball competitions.

They are the current Oceania Champions and finished tenth in the World Championship.

== Results ==
=== World Championships ===
Year	Male Results
(Mauritius) 2017	10th place
Total	1/1

=== Youth Olympic Games ===
Year	Male Results
(Argentina) 2018	Qualified. Did not attend
Total	0/1

=== Oceania Championship ===
Year	Results
(Cook Islands) 2017	1st place
Total	1/1
