= Tanya Beths =

Australian handball player

Personal information
- Nationality: Australian
- Born: 16 January 1989 (age 37) Brisbane
- Height: 1.70 m (5 ft 7 in)

Sport
- Sport: Handball
- Position: Right Wing/ Defense
- Current club: University of Queensland
- Number: 1
National team
- Years: Team
- 2014–2016: Australia (indoor)
- 2013-current: Australia (beach)
Medal record
Representing Australia
Beach Handball Oceania Qualification
Gold medal – first place	2016 Sydney	Regional
Representing Queensland
Gold medal – first place	2013 Adelaide	Nationals
Gold medal – first place	2014 Brisbane	Nationals
Gold medal – first place	2019 Gold Coast	Regional
Women's Beach Handball
Representing Australia
Gold medal – first place	2018 Adelaide	Regional
Silver medal – second place	2020 Gold Coast	Regional

Tanya Beths (born 16 January 1989) is an Australian beach handball player.

She competed for Australia at the 2014 Beach Handball World Championships in Brazil and the 2019 World Beach Games in Qatar. She is also a secondary school teacher that has launched her own pilot program in a number of schools throughout Queensland. A high performance sport program for students with disabilities.

== Achievements ==
- General:
  - Queensland Day Award: 2019
- Handball:
  - Australia Squad: 2013,2014,2015,2019,2020
  - All Star: 2015
  - World Beach Handball Championships 2014: 12th
  - The World Games 2013: 9th
  - The World Beach Games 2019: 11th
  - The Caribbean Pre World Championships Exhibition Tournament: SILVER
  - National Champion:2013,2014,2015, 2019
- Volleyball:
  - Australian Trans Tasmin Team – Vice Captain
  - Current National Tour Series Ranking: 5th
  - Current Queensland State Tour Ranking: 3rd
  - Queensland Best Defender: 2015, 2016
  - Queensland Best Setter: 20018, 2019
  - Queensland Australian Volleyball League Squad Member (AVL): 2007, 2008, 2009
- Cheerleading:
  - Australia Squad: 2007, 2008, 2012, 2013
  - JamFest Championships, Las Vegas: 2012
  - Calgary Stampede: 2008
- Olympic Weightlifting:
  - Contract: Leeds, England: 2011–2012
  - Club: Leeds Carnegie High Performance
  - British Weightlifting University Championships – 63 kg Class: GOLD
- Bobsled:
  - Australia Squad: 2011,2012

== Beach handball career ==
She is part of the Queensland state team and contributed to winning gold during the Australian Championships 2015, and Silver in 2013, 2016, 2020.

- 2015 : Australian Beach Handball Championships – All Star Team (Best right wing defense)
- 2016 : Australian Beach Handball Championships – All Star Team (Best right wing defense)

== Indoor handball career ==
She was part of the Queensland state team for the Australian Championships and contributed to obtaining a gold medal in 2014.

== International indoor handball career ==
She was part of the Australian Indoor team in 2015 & 2016 and was selected to represent Australia with the Senior team at the Oceania Qualifiers in Australia (2016).

== International beach handball career ==
Selected in the Australian Team for the 2019 World Beach Games in Qatar, she was part of the Australian team that secured a 12th position at World Championships in Brazil.She is currently in the Australian squad with selections for the 2020 World Championships due to be made in April.

== See also ==
- World Women's Beach Handball Championship
- Beach handball at the World Games
