= 2016 Asian Youth Beach Handball Championship =

1st Asian Youth Beach Handball Championship 2016
Tournament details
- Host country: Thailand
- Venue(s): 1 (in 1 host city)
- Dates: 10 – 16 August 2016
- Teams: 9 (from 1 confederation)

Final positions
- Champions: Thailand (men); China (women)
- Runner-up: Chinese Taipei (men); Thailand (women)
- Third place: Pakistan (men); Chinese Taipei (women)
- Fourth place: Qatar (men); Hong Kong (women)

The 2016 Asian Youth Beach Handball Championship was the 1st edition of the Asian Youth Beach Handball Championship held from 10 to 16 August 2016 at Pattaya, Thailand under the aegis of Asian Handball Federation. It also acts as the qualification tournament for the 2017 Youth Beach Handball World Championship and the 2018 Summer Youth Olympics.

== Format ==
The tournament was played on the round-robin format. A team had to play match with all the other teams. The final standings were according to the standing in the group table.

Matches were played in sets, the team that wins two sets is the winner of a match. When teams were equal in points the head-to-head result was decisive.

== Men ==
=== Participating nations ===
- Chinese Taipei
- Iran
- Pakistan
- Qatar
- Thailand (Host)

=== Group table ===
Team	Pld	W	L	SW	SL	Diff	Pts
Thailand	4	3	1	6	3	+3	6
Chinese Taipei	4	3	1	6	3	+3	6
Pakistan	4	2	2	4	5	-1	4
Iran	4	1	3	4	7	-3	2
Qatar	4	1	3	4	6	-2	2

=== Results ===
Team 1	Score	Team 2
10 August 2016
18:00
Iran	1 - 2	Chinese Taipei
11 August 2016
18:00
Qatar	0 - 2	Chinese Taipei
18:45
Iran	1 - 2	Thailand
12 August 2016
17:00
Pakistan	0 - 2	Thailand
13 August 2016
16:00
Qatar	1 - 2	Iran
17:30
Chinese Taipei	2 - 0	Pakistan
14 August 2016
16:00
Pakistan	2 - 0	Iran
17:30
Qatar	2 - 0	Thailand
16 August 2016
16:45
Thailand	2 - 0	Chinese Taipei
18:15
Pakistan	2 - 1	Qatar

=== Final standings ===
Gold medal	Thailand (1st Title) (Host)
Silver medal	Chinese Taipei
Bronze medal	Pakistan
4	Iran
5	Qatar

Qualified for the 2018 Summer Youth Olympics and 2017 Youth Beach Handball World Championship
Qualified for the 2017 Youth Beach Handball World Championship

== Women ==
=== Participating nations ===
- China
- Chinese Taipei
- Hong Kong
- Thailand (Host)

=== Group table ===
Team	Pld	W	L	SW	SL	Diff	Pts
China	3	3	0	6	1	+5	6
Thailand	3	2	1	5	3	+2	4
Chinese Taipei	3	1	2	3	4	-1	2
Hong Kong	3	0	3	0	6	-6	0

=== Results ===
Team 1	Score	Team 2
13 August 2016
16:45
China	2 - 0	Chinese Taipei
18:15
Hong Kong	0 - 2	Thailand
14 August 2016
16:45
Hong Kong	0 - 2	Chinese Taipei
18:15
China	2 - 1	Thailand
16 August 2016
16:00
China	2 - 0	Hong Kong
17:30
Thailand	2 - 1	Chinese Taipei

=== Final standings ===
Gold medal	China (1st Title)
Silver medal	Thailand (Host)
Bronze medal	Chinese Taipei
4	Hong Kong

Qualified for the 2018 Summer Youth Olympics
Qualified for the 2017 Youth Beach Handball World Championship
Qualified for the 2017 Youth Beach Handball World Championship
