= Asian Youth Beach Handball Championship =

Competition organised by Asian Handball Federation

- Sport: Beach Handball
- Founded: 2015
- Founder: Asian Handball Federation
- First season: 2016
- No. of teams: 16 (maximum)
- Continent: AHF (Asia)
- Most recent champions: Men – Iran (2nd Title); Women – China (2nd Title)
- Most titles: Men: Iran (2 titles); Women: China (2 titles)
- Broadcaster: Al Kass Sports Channels
- Promotion to: IHF Youth Beach Handball World Championship
- Website: Official Website

The Asian Youth Beach Handball Championship is the official competition for youth men's and women's national Beach Handball teams of Asia, organised by Asian Handball Federation and takes place every four years. In addition to crowning the Asian champions, the tournament also serves as a qualifying tournament for the IHF Youth Beach Handball World Championship.

== Men's tournament ==
=== Summary ===
Year	Host		Final Match				Bronze-medal match		
Year	Host		Gold	Score	Silver		Bronze	Score	Fourth Place
2016; Details	(Thailand); Pattaya		Thailand	No playoffs	Chinese Taipei		Pakistan	No playoffs	Qatar
2022; Details	(Iran); Tehran		Iran	No playoffs	Jordan		Qatar	No playoffs	Pakistan
2024; Details	(Thailand); Bangkok	Iran	No playoffs	Thailand	Qatar	No playoffs	Oman		

=== Medal table ===
Rank	Nation	Gold	Silver	Bronze	Total
1	Iran	2	0	0	2
2	Thailand	1	1	0	2
3	Chinese Taipei	0	1	0	1
3	Jordan	0	1	0	1
5	Qatar	0	0	2	2
6	Pakistan	0	0	1	1
Totals (6 entries)		3	3	3	9

== Women's tournament ==
=== Summary ===
Year	Host		Final Match				Bronze-medal match		
Year	Host		Gold	Score	Silver		Bronze	Score	Fourth Place
2016; Details	(Thailand); Pattaya		China	No playoffs	Thailand		Chinese Taipei	No playoffs	Hong Kong
2022; Details	(Thailand); Bangkok		Thailand	No playoffs	India		Hong Kong	Only three teams participating	
2024; Details	(Thailand); Bangkok	China	No playoffs	Thailand	Indonesia	No playoffs	Hong Kong		

=== Medal table ===
Rank	Nation	Gold	Silver	Bronze	Total
1	China	2	0	0	2
2	Thailand	1	2	0	3
3	India	0	1	0	1
4	Chinese Taipei	0	0	1	1
4	Hong Kong	0	0	1	1
4	Indonesia	0	0	1	1
Totals (6 entries)		3	3	3	9

== See also ==
- Asian Beach Handball Championship
