= Vietnam women's national beach handball team =

National beach handball team of Vietnam

Vietnam

Information
- Association: Vietnam Handball Federation
- Coach: Huỳnh Minh Ngôn

Colours
Home	Away

Results

World Championship
- Appearances: 4 (First in 2018)
- Best result: 9th (2018, 2024)
- Last updated on Unknown.

Vietnam women's national beach handball team
Medal record

Representing Vietnam

Asian Championship
Gold medal – first place	2025 Oman	
Gold medal – first place	2023 Indonesia	
Gold medal – first place	2022 Thailand	
Silver medal – second place	2017 Thailand	
Silver medal – second place	2019 China	
Bronze medal – third place	2015 Oman	

Asian Beach Games
Gold medal – first place	2026 Sanya	
Gold medal – first place	2016 Vietnam	
Bronze medal – third place	2010 Oman	
Bronze medal – third place	2012 China	
Bronze medal – third place	2014 Thailand	

Southeast Asian Championship
Gold medal – first place	2017 Philippines	
Gold medal – first place	2025 Thailand	

Vietnam women's national beach handball team (Vietnamese: Đội tuyển bóng ném bãi biển nữ quốc gia Việt Nam) is a national team of Vietnam. The team takes part in international beach handball competitions and friendly matches.

== Competitions results ==
=== World Championship ===
World Championship					Coach
Year	Place	GP	W	L	Coach
(Egypt) 2004	Did not enter				
(Brazil) 2006	Did not enter				
(Spain) 2008	Did not enter				
(Turkey) 2010	Did not enter				
(Oman) 2012	Did not enter				
(Brazil) 2014	Did not qualify				
(Hungary) 2016	Did not qualify				
(Russia) 2018	9/16	9	5	4	(Vietnam) Huỳnh Minh Ngôn
(Italy) 2020	Qualified, but cancelled due to the COVID-19 pandemic				
(Greece) 2022	13/16	9	4	5	(Vietnam) Huỳnh Minh Ngôn
(China) 2024	9/16	9	6	3	(Vietnam) Huỳnh Minh Ngôn
(Croatia) 2026	11/16	9	5	4	(Vietnam) Huỳnh Minh Ngôn
Total		36	20	16	

=== World Games ===
World Games					Coach
Year	Place	GP	W	L	Coach
(Japan) 2001	Did not enter				
(Germany) 2005	Did not enter				
(Chinese Taipei) 2009	Did not enter				
(Colombia) 2013	Did not enter				
(Poland) 2017	Did not qualify				
(United States) 2022	Qualified but withdrew				
(China) 2025	8th Place	4	0	4	
Total					

=== World Beach Games ===
World Beach Games					Coach
Year	Place	GP	W	L	Coach
(Qatar) 2019	4/12	8	4	4	(Vietnam) Huỳnh Minh Ngôn
Total	4th	8	4	4	

=== Asian Beach Games ===
- 2008 – 5th place
- 2010 – (bronze) Bronze medal
- 2012 – (bronze) Bronze medal
- 2014 – (bronze) Bronze medal
- 2016 – (gold) Gold medal
- 2026 – (gold) Gold medal

=== Asian Championship ===
- 2004 – Did not enter
- 2013 – 4th place
- 2015 – (bronze) Bronze medal
- 2017 – (silver) Silver medal
- 2019 – (silver) Silver medal
- 2022 – Winner
- 2023 – Winner
- 2025 – Winner
- 2027 – To be determined

=== Southeast Asian Championship ===
- 2017 – Winner
- 2025 – Winner
