= 2022 Asian Men's Youth Beach Handball Championship =

2nd Asian Men’s Youth Beach Handball Championship 2022
Tournament details
- Host country: Iran
- Venue(s): 1 (in 1 host city)
- Dates: 22–28 March 2022
- Teams: 6 (from 1 confederation)

Final positions
- Champions: Iran
- Runner-up: Jordan
- Third place: Qatar
- Fourth place: Pakistan

The 2022 Asian Youth Beach Handball Championship will be 2nd edition of the championship to be held from 22 to 28 March 2022 at Tehran, Iran under the aegis of Asian Handball Federation (AHF). It will be first time in history that the championship will be organised by IR Iran Handball Federation. It also acts as a qualification tournament for the 2022 Youth Beach Handball World Championship, with the two teams in each gender from the championship directly qualifying for the event to be hosted by Greece. The participants should be born between 1 January, 2004 and 31 December, 2006.

On 19 February 2020, the AHF decided to postpone the championship due to COVID-19 pandemic. Previously, the championship was scheduled to take place firstly from 1 to 10 April 2020, then from 11 to 17 September 2020 and then from 15 to 22 February 2021 but was postponed all times due to COVID-19 outbreak.

== Draw ==
The date and venue of the draw will be announced soon.

== Men ==
=== Former Seeding ===
Teams were seeded according to the AHF COC regulations and rankings of the previous edition of the championship. Teams who had not participated in the previous edition were in Pot 4.

Pot 1	Pot 2	Pot 3	Pot 4
~~Thailand~~; ~~Chinese Taipei~~	Pakistan; Iran	Qatar	~~Saudi Arabia~~; Jordan; ~~Hong Kong~~; ~~South Korea~~

- Chinese Taipei, Hong Kong, Korea, Saudi Arabia, and Thailand withdrew from the championship before the draw.

=== Participating nations ===
- Afghanistan
- India
- Iran (Host)
- Jordan
- Pakistan
- Qatar

=== Group table ===
Team	Pld	W	L	SW	SL	Diff	Pts
Iran	5	5	0	10	0	+10	10
Jordan	5	3	2	7	5	+2	6
Qatar	5	3	2	7	5	+2	6
Pakistan	5	3	2	7	5	+2	6
India	5	1	4	2	8	-6	2
Afghanistan	5	0	5	0	10	-10	0

=== Results ===
Team 1	Score	Team 2
22 March 2022
10:00
India	2 - 0	Pakistan
11:00
Jordan	2 - 1	Qatar
12:00
Afghanistan	0 - 2	Iran
23 March 2022
10:00
Afghanistan	0 - 2	Jordan
11:00
Qatar	2 - 1	Pakistan
12:00
Iran	2 - 0	India
25 March 2022
10:00
India	0 - 2	Qatar
11:00
Afghanistan	0 - 2	Pakistan
12:00
Iran	2 - 0	Jordan
26 March 2022
10:00
Afghanistan	0 - 2	India
11:00
Jordan	1 - 2	Pakistan
12:00
Iran	2 - 0	Qatar
28 March 2022
10:00
Afghanistan	0 - 2	Qatar
11:00
India	0 - 2	Jordan
12:00
Iran	2 - 0	Pakistan

=== Final standings ===
Gold medal	Iran
Silver medal	Jordan
Bronze medal	Qatar
4	Pakistan
5	India
6	Afghanistan

Qualified for the 2022 Youth Beach Handball World Championship
