= Russia national beach handball team =

Russia national beach handball team may refer to

- Russia men's national beach handball team
- Russia women's national beach handball team
