= 2018 Men's Beach Handball World Championships =

2018 IHF Men's Beach Handball World Championship
Tournament details
- Host country: Russia
- Venue: 1 (in 1 host city)
- Dates: 24–29 July
- Teams: 16 (from 5 confederations)

Final positions
- Champions: Brazil (5th title)
- Runners-up: Croatia
- Third place: Hungary
- Fourth place: Sweden

Tournament statistics
- Top scorers: (Denmark) Martin Andersen (149 points)

Awards
- Best player: (Brazil) Bruno Oliveira

The 2018 Men's Beach Handball World Championships were the eighth edition of the tournament, held at Kazan, Russia from 24 to 29 July 2018.

Brazil won their fifth title by defeating Croatia in the final.

== Qualification ==
Qualification	Vacancies	Qualified
Host	1	Russia
Defending champion	1	Croatia
2017 Asian Beach Handball Championship	4	Qatar; Oman; Iran; Vietnam
2017 European Beach Handball Championship	3	Spain; Hungary; Sweden
2018 Oceania Beach Handball Championship	1	Australia
2018 Pan American Men's Beach Handball Championship	4	Argentina; Brazil; United States; Uruguay
Substitute for Africa continent	1	Denmark
Wildcard	1	New Zealand

== Draw ==
The draw was held on 15 May 2018 at Kazan, Russia.

=== Seeding ===
The seedings were announced on 14 May 2018.

Pot 1	Pot 2	Pot 3	Pot 4
Croatia; Brazil; Qatar; Spain	Russia; Hungary; Oman; Iran	Uruguay; Vietnam; United States; Australia	Sweden; Denmark; Argentina; New Zealand

All times are local (UTC+3).

== Preliminary round ==
=== Group A ===
Pos	Team	Pld	W	L	Pts	SW	SL	SR	SPW	SPL	SPR	Qualification
1	Croatia	3	3	0	6	6	1	6.000	144	119	1.210	Main round
2	Uruguay	3	1	2	2 (Note: Uruguay 2 Pts, ±0 SW, +8 SPW; Iran 2 Pts, ±0 SW, −2 SPW; Argentina 2 Pts, ±0 SW, −6 SPW)	4	5	0.800	121	116	1.043	Main round
3	Iran	3	1	2	2	3	5	0.600	101	109	0.927	Main round
4	Argentina	3	1	2	2	3	5	0.600	92	114	0.807	Consolation round

Source: IHF
Rules for classification: 1) Points; 2) Head-to-head points; 3) Head-to-head set difference; 4) Head-to-head points won; 5) Set difference; 6) Points won; 7) Draw.
Notes:

24 July 2018; 09:50	Croatia	2–1	Uruguay	Beach Sports Complex, Kazan; Referees: Michail Mertinian, Evangelos Syrepisios (GRE)
24 July 2018; 09:50	(22–17, 20–23, 7–6); Report			Beach Sports Complex, Kazan; Referees: Michail Mertinian, Evangelos Syrepisios (GRE)

24 July 2018; 10:40	Iran	1–2	Argentina	Beach Sports Complex, Kazan; Referees: Cao Hongjun, Xu Jian (CHN)
24 July 2018; 10:40	(13–10, 8–12, 4–6); Report			Beach Sports Complex, Kazan; Referees: Cao Hongjun, Xu Jian (CHN)

24 July 2018; 14:50	Uruguay	1–2	Iran	Beach Sports Complex, Kazan; Referees: Dávid Palkovits, Gabor Szilvási (HUN)
24 July 2018; 14:50	(16–15, 14–15, 5–6); Report			Beach Sports Complex, Kazan; Referees: Dávid Palkovits, Gabor Szilvási (HUN)

24 July 2018; 15:40	Argentina	0–2	Croatia	Beach Sports Complex, Kazan; Referees: Khaled Al-Heel, Ali Al-Yazeedi (QAT)
24 July 2018; 15:40	(18–26, 16–24); Report			Beach Sports Complex, Kazan; Referees: Khaled Al-Heel, Ali Al-Yazeedi (QAT)

25 July 2018; 11:10	Croatia	2–0	Iran	Beach Sports Complex, Kazan; Referees: Laura Buchón-Perea, Patricia del Valle-Encuentra (ESP)
25 July 2018; 11:10	(23–22, 22–17); Report			Beach Sports Complex, Kazan; Referees: Laura Buchón-Perea, Patricia del Valle-Encuentra (ESP)

25 July 2018; 11:10	Uruguay	2–1	Argentina	Beach Sports Complex, Kazan; Referees: Mohammed Drissi, Mohammed Ben Salah (TUN)
25 July 2018; 11:10	(16–19, 15–5, 8–6); Report			Beach Sports Complex, Kazan; Referees: Mohammed Drissi, Mohammed Ben Salah (TUN)

=== Group B ===
Pos	Team	Pld	W	L	Pts	SW	SL	SR	SPW	SPL	SPR	Qualification
1	Spain	3	3	0	6	6	1	6.000	133	93	1.430	Main round
2	Hungary	3	2	1	4	5	2	2.500	140	106	1.321	Main round
3	Vietnam	3	1	2	2	2	5	0.400	92	119	0.773	Main round
4	New Zealand	3	0	3	0	1	6	0.167	82	129	0.636	Consolation round

Source: IHF
Rules for classification: 1) Points; 2) Head-to-head points; 3) Head-to-head set difference; 4) Head-to-head points won; 5) Set difference; 6) Points won; 7) Draw.

24 July 2018; 09:50	Spain	2–0	Vietnam	Beach Sports Complex, Kazan; Referees: Mohammed Drissi, Mohammed Ben Salah (TUN)
24 July 2018; 09:50	(23–9, 15–10); Report			Beach Sports Complex, Kazan; Referees: Mohammed Drissi, Mohammed Ben Salah (TUN)

24 July 2018; 11:30	Hungary	2–0	New Zealand	Beach Sports Complex, Kazan; Referees: Wanderson Oliveira, Fabiano Carvalho (BRA)
24 July 2018; 11:30	(19–12, 24–12); Report			Beach Sports Complex, Kazan; Referees: Wanderson Oliveira, Fabiano Carvalho (BRA)

24 July 2018; 15:40	Vietnam	0–2	Hungary	Beach Sports Complex, Kazan; Referees: Pablo Martínez, Luiz Monico (URU)
24 July 2018; 15:40	(16–20, 17–25); Report			Beach Sports Complex, Kazan; Referees: Pablo Martínez, Luiz Monico (URU)

24 July 2018; 16:30	New Zealand	0–2	Spain	Beach Sports Complex, Kazan; Referees: Ana Carina Barbosa, Nadia Machado (POR)
24 July 2018; 16:30	(10–24, 12–22); Report			Beach Sports Complex, Kazan; Referees: Ana Carina Barbosa, Nadia Machado (POR)

25 July 2018; 09:30	Spain	2–1	Hungary	Beach Sports Complex, Kazan; Referees: Michail Mertinian, Evangelos Syrepisios (GRE)
25 July 2018; 09:30	(19–18, 16–22, 14–12); Report			Beach Sports Complex, Kazan; Referees: Michail Mertinian, Evangelos Syrepisios (GRE)

25 July 2018; 09:30	Vietnam	2–1	New Zealand	Beach Sports Complex, Kazan; Referees: Dávid Palkovits, Gabor Szilvási (HUN)
25 July 2018; 09:30	(18–14, 16–17, 6–5); Report			Beach Sports Complex, Kazan; Referees: Dávid Palkovits, Gabor Szilvási (HUN)

=== Group C ===
Pos	Team	Pld	W	L	Pts	SW	SL	SR	SPW	SPL	SPR	Qualification
1	Qatar	3	2	1	4 (Note: Qatar 2 Pts, +1 SW; Denmark ± 0 SW; Oman −1 SW)	5	2	2.500	135	102	1.324	Main round
2	Denmark	3	2	1	4	4	2	2.000	95	87	1.092	Main round
3	Oman	3	2	1	4	4	4	1.000	100	107	0.935	Main round
4	Australia	3	0	3	0	1	6	0.167	76	110	0.691	Consolation round

Source: IHF
Rules for classification: 1) Points; 2) Head-to-head points; 3) Head-to-head set difference; 4) Head-to-head points won; 5) Set difference; 6) Points won; 7) Draw.
Notes:

24 July 2018; 09:00	Oman	0–2	Denmark	Beach Sports Complex, Kazan; Referees: Dávid Palkovits, Gabor Szilvási (HUN)
24 July 2018; 09:00	(6–13, 11–12); Report			Beach Sports Complex, Kazan; Referees: Dávid Palkovits, Gabor Szilvási (HUN)

24 July 2018; 09:00	Qatar	2–0	Australia	Beach Sports Complex, Kazan; Referees: Mohammed Drissi, Mohammed Ben Salah (TUN)
24 July 2018; 09:00	(21–10, 21–7); Report			Beach Sports Complex, Kazan; Referees: Mohammed Drissi, Mohammed Ben Salah (TUN)

24 July 2018; 14:00	Denmark	0–2	Qatar	Beach Sports Complex, Kazan; Referees: Michail Mertinian, Evangelos Syrepisios (GRE)
24 July 2018; 14:00	(15–18, 20–22); Report			Beach Sports Complex, Kazan; Referees: Michail Mertinian, Evangelos Syrepisios (GRE)

24 July 2018; 14:00	Australia	1–2	Oman	Beach Sports Complex, Kazan; Referees: Laura Buchón-Perea, Patricia del Valle-Encuentra (ESP)
24 July 2018; 14:00	(8–16, 15–8, 6–9); Report			Beach Sports Complex, Kazan; Referees: Laura Buchón-Perea, Patricia del Valle-Encuentra (ESP)

25 July 2018; 15:00	Qatar	1–2	Oman	Beach Sports Complex, Kazan; Referees: Wanderson Oliveira, Fabiano Carvalho (BRA)
25 July 2018; 15:00	(18–20, 21–15, 14–15); Report			Beach Sports Complex, Kazan; Referees: Wanderson Oliveira, Fabiano Carvalho (BRA)

25 July 2018; 15:00	Australia	0–2	Denmark	Beach Sports Complex, Kazan; Referees: Mohammed Drissi, Mohammed Ben Salah (TUN)
25 July 2018; 15:00	(18–19, 12–16); Report			Beach Sports Complex, Kazan; Referees: Mohammed Drissi, Mohammed Ben Salah (TUN)

=== Group D ===
Pos	Team	Pld	W	L	Pts	SW	SL	SR	SPW	SPL	SPR	Qualification
1	Sweden	3	3	0	6	6	3	2.000	141	131	1.076	Main round
2	Russia (H)	3	2	1	4	5	3	1.667	139	134	1.037	Main round
3	Brazil	3	1	2	2	3	4	0.750	124	109	1.138	Main round
4	United States	3	0	3	0	2	6	0.333	130	160	0.813	Consolation round

Source: IHF
Rules for classification: 1) Points; 2) Head-to-head points; 3) Head-to-head set difference; 4) Head-to-head points won; 5) Set difference; 6) Points won; 7) Draw.
(H) Host

24 July 2018; 11:30	Russia	1–2	Sweden	Beach Sports Complex, Kazan; Referees: Pablo Martínez, Luiz Monico (URU)
24 July 2018; 11:30	(20–13, 18–23, 6–9); Report			Beach Sports Complex, Kazan; Referees: Pablo Martínez, Luiz Monico (URU)

24 July 2018; 11:30	Brazil	2–0	United States	Beach Sports Complex, Kazan; Referees: Mohammed Drissi, Mohammed Ben Salah (TUN)
24 July 2018; 11:30	(23–10, 26–19); Report			Beach Sports Complex, Kazan; Referees: Mohammed Drissi, Mohammed Ben Salah (TUN)

24 July 2018; 16:30	Sweden	2–1	Brazil	Beach Sports Complex, Kazan; Referees: Cao Hongjun, Xu Jian (CHN)
24 July 2018; 16:30	(18–16, 13–16, 12–10); Report			Beach Sports Complex, Kazan; Referees: Cao Hongjun, Xu Jian (CHN)

24 July 2018; 19:30	United States	1–2	Russia	Beach Sports Complex, Kazan; Referees: Michail Mertinian, Evangelos Syrepisios (GRE)
24 July 2018; 19:30	(20–23, 28–26, 8–9); Report			Beach Sports Complex, Kazan; Referees: Michail Mertinian, Evangelos Syrepisios (GRE)

25 July 2018; 16:40	Brazil	0–2	Russia	Beach Sports Complex, Kazan; Referees: Dávid Palkovits, Gabor Szilvási (HUN)
25 July 2018; 16:40	(13–16, 20–21); Report			Beach Sports Complex, Kazan; Referees: Dávid Palkovits, Gabor Szilvási (HUN)

25 July 2018; 16:40	United States	1–2	Sweden	Beach Sports Complex, Kazan; Referees: Khaled Al-Heel, Ali Al-Yazeedi (QAT)
25 July 2018; 16:40	(16–24, 21–20, 8–9); Report			Beach Sports Complex, Kazan; Referees: Khaled Al-Heel, Ali Al-Yazeedi (QAT)

== Consolation round ==
Pos	Team	Pld	W	L	Pts	SW	SL	SR	SPW	SPL	SPR
1	United States	3	3	0	6	6	0	MAX	131	118	1.110
2	Australia	3	2	1	4	4	2	2.000	122	113	1.080
3	Argentina	3	1	2	2	2	4	0.500	104	111	0.937
4	New Zealand	3	0	3	0	0	6	0.000	103	118	0.873

Source: IHF
Rules for classification: 1) Points; 2) Head-to-head points; 3) Head-to-head set difference; 4) Head-to-head points won; 5) Set difference; 6) Points won; 7) Draw.

26 July 2018; 09:00	Argentina	0–2	Australia	Beach Sports Complex, Kazan; Referees: Laura Buchón-Perea, Patricia del Valle-Encuentra (ESP)
26 July 2018; 09:00	(17–20, 12–15); Report			Beach Sports Complex, Kazan; Referees: Laura Buchón-Perea, Patricia del Valle-Encuentra (ESP)

26 July 2018; 09:00	New Zealand	0–2	United States	Beach Sports Complex, Kazan; Referees: Michail Mertinian, Evangelos Syrepisios (GRE)
26 July 2018; 09:00	(18–20, 16–20); Report			Beach Sports Complex, Kazan; Referees: Michail Mertinian, Evangelos Syrepisios (GRE)

26 July 2018; 14:00	United States	2–0	Argentina	Beach Sports Complex, Kazan; Referees: Ana Carina Barbosa, Nadia Machado (POR)
26 July 2018; 14:00	(19–16, 22–20); Report			Beach Sports Complex, Kazan; Referees: Ana Carina Barbosa, Nadia Machado (POR)

26 July 2018; 14:00	Australia	2–0	New Zealand	Beach Sports Complex, Kazan; Referees: Cao Hongjun, Xu Jian (CHN)
26 July 2018; 14:00	(17–16, 22–18); Report			Beach Sports Complex, Kazan; Referees: Cao Hongjun, Xu Jian (CHN)

27 July 2018; 09:00	Argentina	2–0	New Zealand	Beach Sports Complex, Kazan; Referees: Ana Carina Barbosa, Nadia Machado (POR)
27 July 2018; 09:00	(20–17, 19–18); Report			Beach Sports Complex, Kazan; Referees: Ana Carina Barbosa, Nadia Machado (POR)

27 July 2018; 09:00	Australia	0–2	United States	Beach Sports Complex, Kazan; Referees: Cao Hongjun, Xu Jian (CHN)
27 July 2018; 09:00	(26–27, 22–23); Report			Beach Sports Complex, Kazan; Referees: Cao Hongjun, Xu Jian (CHN)

== Main round ==
=== Group I ===
Points obtained against teams from the same group were carried over.

Pos	Team	Pld	W	L	Pts	SW	SL	SR	SPW	SPL	SPR	Qualification
1	Croatia	5	5	0	10	10	2	5.000	236	216	1.093	Quarterfinals
2	Spain	5	4	1	8	9	3	3.000	220	170	1.294	Quarterfinals
3	Hungary	5	3	2	6	7	6	1.167	232	201	1.154	Quarterfinals
4	Iran	5	2	3	4	5	7	0.714	162	191	0.848	Quarterfinals
5	Uruguay	5	1	4	2	5	8	0.625	183	204	0.897	
6	Vietnam	5	0	5	0	0	10	0.000	143	194	0.737	

Source: IHF
Rules for classification: 1) Points; 2) Head-to-head points; 3) Head-to-head set difference; 4) Head-to-head points won; 5) Set difference; 6) Points won; 7) Draw.

26 July 2018; 09:50	Croatia	2–0	Vietnam	Beach Sports Complex, Kazan; Referees: Cao Hongjun, Xu Jian (CHN)
26 July 2018; 09:50	(23–20, 21–18); Report			Beach Sports Complex, Kazan; Referees: Cao Hongjun, Xu Jian (CHN)

26 July 2018; 09:50	Uruguay	1–2	Hungary	Beach Sports Complex, Kazan; Referees: Khaled Al-Heel, Ali Al-Yazeedi (QAT)
26 July 2018; 09:50	(18–17, 12–20, 6–7); Report			Beach Sports Complex, Kazan; Referees: Khaled Al-Heel, Ali Al-Yazeedi (QAT)

26 July 2018; 09:50	Iran	0–2	Spain	Beach Sports Complex, Kazan; Referees: Pablo Martínez, Luiz Monico (URU)
26 July 2018; 09:50	(16–22, 6–15); Report			Beach Sports Complex, Kazan; Referees: Pablo Martínez, Luiz Monico (URU)

26 July 2018; 14:50	Uruguay	0–2	Spain	Beach Sports Complex, Kazan; Referees: Michail Mertinian, Evangelos Syrepisios (GRE)
26 July 2018; 14:50	(17–21, 14–24); Report			Beach Sports Complex, Kazan; Referees: Michail Mertinian, Evangelos Syrepisios (GRE)

26 July 2018; 14:50	Croatia	2–0	Hungary	Beach Sports Complex, Kazan; Referees: Wanderson Oliveira, Fabiano Carvalho (BRA)
26 July 2018; 14:50	(25–18, 27–24); Report			Beach Sports Complex, Kazan; Referees: Wanderson Oliveira, Fabiano Carvalho (BRA)

26 July 2018; 14:50	Iran	2–0	Vietnam	Beach Sports Complex, Kazan; Referees: Khaled Al-Heel, Ali Al-Yazeedi (QAT)
26 July 2018; 14:50	(15–14, 18–10); Report			Beach Sports Complex, Kazan; Referees: Khaled Al-Heel, Ali Al-Yazeedi (QAT)

27 July 2018; 15:50	Croatia	2–1	Spain	Beach Sports Complex, Kazan; Referees: Khaled Al-Heel, Ali Al-Yazeedi (QAT)
27 July 2018; 15:50	(18–17, 19–26, 9–8); Report			Beach Sports Complex, Kazan; Referees: Khaled Al-Heel, Ali Al-Yazeedi (QAT)

27 July 2018; 15:50	Uruguay	2–0	Vietnam	Beach Sports Complex, Kazan; Referees: Wanderson Oliveira, Fabiano Carvalho (BRA)
27 July 2018; 15:50	(18–14, 16–15); Report			Beach Sports Complex, Kazan; Referees: Wanderson Oliveira, Fabiano Carvalho (BRA)

27 July 2018; 15:50	Iran	1–2	Hungary	Beach Sports Complex, Kazan; Referees: Mohammed Drissi, Mohammed Ben Salah (TUN)
27 July 2018; 15:50	(14–12, 13–32, 4–5); Report			Beach Sports Complex, Kazan; Referees: Mohammed Drissi, Mohammed Ben Salah (TUN)

=== Group II ===
Points obtained against teams from the same group were carried over.

Pos	Team	Pld	W	L	Pts	SW	SL	SR	SPW	SPL	SPR	Qualification
1	Sweden	5	4	1	8	8	4	2.000	192	188	1.021	Quarterfinals
2	Russia (H)	5	3	2	6	8	6	1.333	227	208	1.091	Quarterfinals
3	Brazil	5	2	3	4 (Note: Brazil 4 Pts, +3 SW; Denmark 4 Pts, +1 SW; Qatar 2 Pts, −1 SW; Oman 2 Pts, −3 SW)	6	6	1.000	208	189	1.101	Quarterfinals
4	Denmark	5	2	3	4	5	7	0.714	182	192	0.948	Quarterfinals
5	Qatar	5	2	3	4	6	6	1.000	218	204	1.069	
6	Oman	5	2	3	4	4	8	0.500	161	207	0.778	

Source: IHF
Rules for classification: 1) Points; 2) Head-to-head points; 3) Head-to-head set difference; 4) Head-to-head points won; 5) Set difference; 6) Points won; 7) Draw.
(H) Host
Notes:

26 July 2018; 11:30	Qatar	0–2	Brazil	Beach Sports Complex, Kazan; Referees: Michail Mertinian, Evangelos Syrepisios (GRE)
26 July 2018; 11:30	(16–18, 18–23); Report			Beach Sports Complex, Kazan; Referees: Michail Mertinian, Evangelos Syrepisios (GRE)

26 July 2018; 11:30	Denmark	1–2	Russia	Beach Sports Complex, Kazan; Referees: Pablo Martínez, Luiz Monico (URU)
26 July 2018; 11:30	(17–12, 21–28, 6–7); Report			Beach Sports Complex, Kazan; Referees: Pablo Martínez, Luiz Monico (URU)

26 July 2018; 11:30	Oman	0–2	Sweden	Beach Sports Complex, Kazan; Referees: Mohammed Drissi, Mohammed Ben Salah (TUN)
26 July 2018; 11:30	(12–14, 14–26); Report			Beach Sports Complex, Kazan; Referees: Mohammed Drissi, Mohammed Ben Salah (TUN)

26 July 2018; 16:30	Oman	0–2	Brazil	Beach Sports Complex, Kazan; Referees: Laura Buchón-Perea, Patricia del Valle-Encuentra (ESP)
26 July 2018; 16:30	(15–16, 14–24); Report			Beach Sports Complex, Kazan; Referees: Laura Buchón-Perea, Patricia del Valle-Encuentra (ESP)

26 July 2018; 16:30	Denmark	0–2	Sweden	Beach Sports Complex, Kazan; Referees: Dávid Palkovits, Gabor Szilvási (HUN)
26 July 2018; 16:30	(10–12, 22–24); Report			Beach Sports Complex, Kazan; Referees: Dávid Palkovits, Gabor Szilvási (HUN)

26 July 2018; 19:00	Qatar	1–2	Russia	Beach Sports Complex, Kazan; Referees: Dávid Palkovits, Gabor Szilvási (HUN)
26 July 2018; 19:00	(17–16, 16–19, 14–15); Report			Beach Sports Complex, Kazan; Referees: Dávid Palkovits, Gabor Szilvási (HUN)

27 July 2018; 16:40	Qatar	2–0	Sweden	Beach Sports Complex, Kazan; Referees: Pablo Martínez, Luiz Monico (URU)
27 July 2018; 16:40	(26–12, 18–16); Report			Beach Sports Complex, Kazan; Referees: Pablo Martínez, Luiz Monico (URU)

27 July 2018; 16:40	Denmark	2–1	Brazil	Beach Sports Complex, Kazan; Referees: Mohammed Drissi, Mohammed Ben Salah (TUN)
27 July 2018; 16:40	(10–20, 29–26, 7–6); Report			Beach Sports Complex, Kazan; Referees: Mohammed Drissi, Mohammed Ben Salah (TUN)

27 July 2018; 16:40	Oman	2–1	Russia	Beach Sports Complex, Kazan; Referees: Michail Mertinian, Evangelos Syrepisios (GRE)
27 July 2018; 16:40	(12–24, 16–15, 11–10); Report			Beach Sports Complex, Kazan; Referees: Michail Mertinian, Evangelos Syrepisios (GRE)

== Knockout stage ==
Championship bracket

Quarterfinals
Croatia	2
Denmark	1
Russia	0
Hungary	2
Spain	1
Brazil	2
Sweden	2
Iran	0

Semifinals
Croatia	2
Hungary	0
Brazil	2
Sweden	0

Final
Croatia	0
Brazil	2
Third place
Hungary	2
Sweden	0

Fifth place bracket

5–8th place semifinals
Denmark	1
Russia	2
Spain	2
Iran	0

Fifth place game
Russia	0
Spain	2
Seventh place game
Denmark	2
Iran	0

9–16th place bracket

9–16th place quarterfinals
Qatar	2
New Zealand	0
Vietnam	0
United States	2
Uruguay	0
Argentina	2
Oman	2
Australia	1

9–12th place semifinals
Qatar	2
United States	0
Argentina	0
Oman	2

Ninth place game
Qatar	2
Oman	1
Eleventh place game
United States	1
Argentina	2

13–16th place bracket

13–16th place semifinals
New Zealand	0
Vietnam	2
Uruguay	1
Australia	2

13th place game
Vietnam	0
Australia	2
15th place game
New Zealand	0
Uruguay	2

=== 9–16th place quarterfinals ===
28 July 2018; 09:00	Qatar	2–0	New Zealand	Beach Sports Complex, Kazan; Referees: Ana Carina Barbosa, Nadia Machado (POR)
28 July 2018; 09:00	(20–16, 20–8); Report			Beach Sports Complex, Kazan; Referees: Ana Carina Barbosa, Nadia Machado (POR)

28 July 2018; 10:40	Vietnam	0–2	United States	Beach Sports Complex, Kazan; Referees: Michail Mertinian, Evangelos Syrepisios (GRE)
28 July 2018; 10:40	(15–19, 22–23); Report			Beach Sports Complex, Kazan; Referees: Michail Mertinian, Evangelos Syrepisios (GRE)

28 July 2018; 11:30	Uruguay	0–2	Argentina	Beach Sports Complex, Kazan; Referees: Dávid Palkovits, Gabor Szilvási (HUN)
28 July 2018; 11:30	(16–19, 22–23); Report			Beach Sports Complex, Kazan; Referees: Dávid Palkovits, Gabor Szilvási (HUN)

28 July 2018; 11:30	Oman	2–1	Australia	Beach Sports Complex, Kazan; Referees: Cao Hongjun, Xu Jian (CHN)
28 July 2018; 11:30	(21–14, 8–13, 8–4); Report			Beach Sports Complex, Kazan; Referees: Cao Hongjun, Xu Jian (CHN)

=== Quarterfinals ===
28 July 2018; 09:00	Iran	0–2	Sweden	Beach Sports Complex, Kazan; Referees: Michail Mertinian, Evangelos Syrepisios (GRE)
28 July 2018; 09:00	(1–18, 14–15); Report			Beach Sports Complex, Kazan; Referees: Michail Mertinian, Evangelos Syrepisios (GRE)

28 July 2018; 09:00	Spain	1–2	Brazil	Beach Sports Complex, Kazan; Referees: Dávid Palkovits, Gabor Szilvási (HUN)
28 July 2018; 09:00	(18–25, 22–21, 14–16); Report			Beach Sports Complex, Kazan; Referees: Dávid Palkovits, Gabor Szilvási (HUN)

28 July 2018; 10:40	Croatia	2–1	Denmark	Beach Sports Complex, Kazan; Referees: Laura Buchón-Perea, Patricia del Valle-Encuentra (ESP)
28 July 2018; 10:40	(25–22, 17–24, 8–6); Report			Beach Sports Complex, Kazan; Referees: Laura Buchón-Perea, Patricia del Valle-Encuentra (ESP)

28 July 2018; 11:30	Hungary	2–0	Russia	Beach Sports Complex, Kazan; Referees: Khaled Al-Heel, Ali Al-Yazeedi (QAT)
28 July 2018; 11:30	(21–20, 21–14); Report			Beach Sports Complex, Kazan; Referees: Khaled Al-Heel, Ali Al-Yazeedi (QAT)

=== 13–16th place semifinals ===
28 July 2018; 14:10	New Zealand	0–2	Vietnam	Beach Sports Complex, Kazan; Referees: Pablo Martínez, Luiz Monico (URU)
28 July 2018; 14:10	(14–16, 8–15); Report			Beach Sports Complex, Kazan; Referees: Pablo Martínez, Luiz Monico (URU)

28 July 2018; 15:50	Uruguay	1–2	Australia	Beach Sports Complex, Kazan; Referees: Mohammed Drissi, Mohammed Ben Salah (TUN)
28 July 2018; 15:50	(22–16, 12–16, 6–9); Report			Beach Sports Complex, Kazan; Referees: Mohammed Drissi, Mohammed Ben Salah (TUN)

=== 9–12th place semifinals ===
28 July 2018; 14:10	Qatar	2–0	United States	Beach Sports Complex, Kazan; Referees: Cao Hongjun, Xu Jian (CHN)
28 July 2018; 14:10	(26–14, 19–18); Report			Beach Sports Complex, Kazan; Referees: Cao Hongjun, Xu Jian (CHN)

28 July 2018; 15:50	Argentina	0–2	Oman	Beach Sports Complex, Kazan; Referees: Ana Carina Barbosa, Nadia Machado (POR)
28 July 2018; 15:50	(15–22, 16–22); Report			Beach Sports Complex, Kazan; Referees: Ana Carina Barbosa, Nadia Machado (POR)

=== 5–8th place semifinals ===
28 July 2018; 14:10	Iran	0–2	Spain	Beach Sports Complex, Kazan; Referees: Wanderson Oliveira, Fabiano Carvalho (BRA)
28 July 2018; 14:10	(9–18, 12–20); Report			Beach Sports Complex, Kazan; Referees: Wanderson Oliveira, Fabiano Carvalho (BRA)

28 July 2018; 15:50	Denmark	1–2	Russia	Beach Sports Complex, Kazan; Referees: Dávid Palkovits, Gabor Szilvási (HUN)
28 July 2018; 15:50	(18–24, 23–22, 6–7); Report			Beach Sports Complex, Kazan; Referees: Dávid Palkovits, Gabor Szilvási (HUN)

=== Semifinals ===
28 July 2018; 17:30	Sweden	0–2	Brazil	Beach Sports Complex, Kazan; Referees: Mohammed Drissi, Mohammed Ben Salah (TUN)
28 July 2018; 17:30	(14–17, 12–20); Report			Beach Sports Complex, Kazan; Referees: Mohammed Drissi, Mohammed Ben Salah (TUN)

28 July 2018; 19:10	Croatia	2–0	Hungary	Beach Sports Complex, Kazan; Referees: Wanderson Oliveira, Fabiano Carvalho (BRA)
28 July 2018; 19:10	(26–18, 28–22); Report			Beach Sports Complex, Kazan; Referees: Wanderson Oliveira, Fabiano Carvalho (BRA)

=== 15th place game ===
29 July 2018; 09:00	New Zealand	0–2	Uruguay	Beach Sports Complex, Kazan; Referees: Wanderson Oliveira, Fabiano Carvalho (BRA)
29 July 2018; 09:00	(18–21, 20–23); Report			Beach Sports Complex, Kazan; Referees: Wanderson Oliveira, Fabiano Carvalho (BRA)

=== 13th place game ===
29 July 2018; 10:40	Vietnam	0–2	Australia	Beach Sports Complex, Kazan; Referees: Mohammed Drissi, Mohammed Ben Salah (TUN)
29 July 2018; 10:40	(12–16, 10–20); Report			Beach Sports Complex, Kazan; Referees: Mohammed Drissi, Mohammed Ben Salah (TUN)

=== Eleventh place game ===
29 July 2018; 09:00	United States	1–2	Argentina	Beach Sports Complex, Kazan; Referees: Khaled Al-Heel, Ali Al-Yazeedi (QAT)
29 July 2018; 09:00	(24–16, 18–22, 4–7); Report			Beach Sports Complex, Kazan; Referees: Khaled Al-Heel, Ali Al-Yazeedi (QAT)

=== Ninth place game ===
29 July 2018; 10:40	Qatar	2–1	Oman	Beach Sports Complex, Kazan; Referees: Dávid Palkovits, Gabor Szilvási (HUN)
29 July 2018; 10:40	(18–10, 11–12, 9–6); Report			Beach Sports Complex, Kazan; Referees: Dávid Palkovits, Gabor Szilvási (HUN)

=== Seventh place game ===
29 July 2018; 09:00	Denmark	2–0	Iran	Beach Sports Complex, Kazan; Referees: Mohammed Drissi, Mohammed Ben Salah (TUN)
29 July 2018; 09:00	(14–12, 23–20); Report			Beach Sports Complex, Kazan; Referees: Mohammed Drissi, Mohammed Ben Salah (TUN)

=== Fifth place game ===
29 July 2018; 10:40	Russia	0–2	Spain	Beach Sports Complex, Kazan; Referees: Wanderson Oliveira, Fabiano Carvalho (BRA)
29 July 2018; 10:40	(14–23, 22–23); Report			Beach Sports Complex, Kazan; Referees: Wanderson Oliveira, Fabiano Carvalho (BRA)

=== Third place game ===
29 July 2018; 16:00	Sweden	0–2	Hungary	Beach Sports Complex, Kazan; Referees: Michail Mertinian, Evangelos Syrepisios (GRE)
29 July 2018; 16:00	(12–18, 16–17); Report			Beach Sports Complex, Kazan; Referees: Michail Mertinian, Evangelos Syrepisios (GRE)

=== Final ===
29 July 2018; 18:00	Brazil	2–0	Croatia	Beach Sports Complex, Kazan; Referees: Khaled Al-Heel, Ali Al-Yazeedi (QAT)
29 July 2018; 18:00	(19–18, 22–20); Report			Beach Sports Complex, Kazan; Referees: Khaled Al-Heel, Ali Al-Yazeedi (QAT)

== Final ranking ==
Rank	Team
1st place, gold medalist(s)	Brazil
2nd place, silver medalist(s)	Croatia
3rd place, bronze medalist(s)	Hungary
4	Sweden
5	Spain
6	Russia
7	Denmark
8	Iran
9	Qatar
10	Oman
11	Argentina
12	United States
13	Australia
14	Vietnam
15	Uruguay
16	New Zealand

== Awards ==
MVP

- (Brazil) Bruno Oliveira

Topscorer

- (Denmark) Martin Andersen (149 points)

All-star team

- Goalkeeper: (Qatar) Mohamed Abidi
- Right wing: (Croatia) Lucijan Bura
- Left wing: (Croatia) Ivan Jurić
- Pivot: (Hungary) Attila Kun
- Defender: (Brazil) Thiago Barcellos
- Specialist: (Brazil) Bruno Oliveira

Fair play award

- Australia
