= 2017 Youth Beach Handball World Championship =

2017 IHF Youth (U-17) Beach Handball World Championship
- Logo of 1st IHF Youth (U-17) Beach Handball World Championship

Tournament details
- Host country: Mauritius
- Venue: 1 (in 1 host city)
- Dates: 11 - 16 July 2017
- Teams: 15 (from 5 confederations)

Final positions
- Champions: Men: Spain (1st title); Women: Hungary (1st title)
- Runners-up: Men: Italy; Women: Netherlands
- Third place: Men: Argentina; Women: Argentina
- Fourth place: Men: Russia; Women: Portugal

The 2017 Youth Beach Handball World Championship was the first edition of IHF Youth Beach Handball World Championship organised by the Mauritius Handball Association under the auspices of the International Handball Federation. The event was held in Flic-en-Flac, Mauritius from 11 to 16 July 2017. It was played in under-17 years category. It also acted as a qualification tournament for the 2018 Summer Youth Olympics which was held in Buenos Aires, Argentina.

== Bidding process ==
The International Handball Federation received three bids from Croatia, Hong Kong China and Mauritius for the hosting of 1st IHF Youth (U-17) Beach Handball World Championship. The bids were analyzed by the IHF Beach Handball Working Group. According to the recommendations of the IHF Beach Handball Working Group, the U17 Beach Handball World Championships 2017 should be organized in a country outside Europe to widen the geographical borders of handball. Mauritius offers natural beaches and good climate conditions as well as hotels in walking distance to the venue. The IHF Beach Handball Working Group graded the bidders according to their bidding concept and participation fee per person/per day follows: Croatia 90%, Hong Kong 90% and Mauritius 95%.

The IHF Council unanimously awarded the 1st IHF Youth (U-17) Beach Handball World Championships to the Mauritius on 23 July 2016 in a meeting held in Bratislava, Slovakia on the recommendation of the IHF Beach Handball Working Group.

== Format ==
The sixteen teams were split into four groups of four teams. After playing a round-robin, the three top ranked team advanced to the main round. Every team kept the points from preliminary round matches against teams who also advance. In the main round every team had three games against the opponents they did not face in the preliminary round. The top four teams of main round will advanced to the quarterfinals.

All matches shall be played in 2 X 10 minutes with a half – time of 5 minutes. The team that wins two sets is the winner of a match, according to the official IHF Rules for Beach Handball. Points are awarded as follows:

- Win = 2 points
- Defeat = 0 points

=== Tie-breaking criterion ===
If two or more teams have gained the same number of points, after the group matches have been completed, classification is decided as follows:

(i) Results in points between the teams concerned

(ii) Periods difference in the matches between the teams concerned

(iii) Goal points difference in the matches between the teams concerned

(iv) Greater number of plus goal points in the matches between the teams concerned

(v) If the teams are still equal, a decision is made between those teams with equal number of points, as long as the contested place is not the last place within the group, as follows

(vi) Periods difference is subtracted in all matches

(vii) Greater number of plus periods in all matches

(viii) Goal point’s difference is subtracted in all matches

(ix) Greater number of plus goal points in all matches

(x) If classification still is not possible, a draw shall decide. The IHF representative on site shall execute the draw, if possible in the presence of the “responsible team official”. If the “responsible team official” cannot be present, other co-workers selected by IHF shall take part in draw.

=== Qualification criterion for the 2018 Summer Youth Olympics ===
To be eligible to participate in the 2018 Summer Youth Olympics, athletes must have been born between 1 January 2000 and 31 December 2002. Nine (9) quota places will be allocated at the 2017 Youth Beach Handball World Championship to the top ranked teams of the respective continents according to the distribution below:

- One country from Africa
- Two countries from Asia
- Three countries from Europe
- Two countries from Pan-America
- One country from Oceania

The host country of the YOG 2018, Argentina should decide which gender they are going to participate in YOG 2018. For any unused host country places reallocation of unused quota places is valid. According to the Buenos Aires 2018 Qualification Systems Principles, participation in team sports shall be limited to one women’s and one men’s team per NOC across team sports (Football, Handball, Hockey, and Rugby) with the exception of the Host Country who can enter one team per sport.

Reallocation of unused qualification places

If a quota place allocated is not confirmed by the NOC by the confirmation of quota place deadline or is declined by the NOC, the quota place will be reallocated to the next best-ranked NOC from the respective continent not yet qualified from the Youth Beach Handball World Championship. If the quota place is still available, it will be reallocated to the best-ranked NOC from the respective continent not yet qualified in the IHF Beach Handball Senior Ranking, of 20 July 2017. If the quota place is still available, it will be reallocated to the best-ranked NOC not yet qualified in the IHF Beach Handball Senior Ranking, of 20 July 2017.

Reallocation of unused host country places

Any unused host country place (returned or achieved through the 2017 Youth Beach Handball World Championship) will be reallocated to the next best-ranked NOC not yet qualified from the Pan-American continent at the 2017 Youth Beach Handball World Championship. If the quota place is still available, it will be reallocated to the best-ranked NOC from Pan-America not yet qualified in the IHF Beach Handball Senior Ranking, of 20 July 2017. If the quota place is still available, it will be reallocated to the best-ranked NOC not yet qualified in the IHF Beach Handball Senior Ranking, of 20 July 2017.

== Draw ==
The draw was held on 17 May 2017. Draw was conducted by Mr. Giampiero Masi (Italy), Chairman of the IHF Beach Handball Working Group.

=== Seeding ===
Men

Pot 1	Pot 2	Pot 3	Pot 4
Brazil; Thailand; Portugal; Spain	Argentina; Chinese Taipei; Italy; Russia	Australia; Pakistan; Paraguay; Venezuela	Mauritius; New Zealand; South Africa; Togo

Women

Pot 1	Pot 2	Pot 3	Pot 4
Argentina; China; Netherlands; Spain	Brazil; Hungary; Portugal; Thailand	American Samoa; Chinese Taipei; Paraguay; Venezuela	Australia; Croatia; Mauritius; Togo

== Referees ==
Following 9 referee pairs were selected for the championship:

Referees
Brazil	Sydney Antonio Dos Santos / Wanderson Oliveira
China	Xu Jian / Cao Hongjun
Croatia	Dario Rupčić / Ivica Botincan
Greece	Michael Mertinian / Evangelos Syrepisios
Poland / Turkey	Agnieszka Skowronek / Sibel Erdoğan

Referees
Qatar	Khaled Al-Heel / Ali Al-Yazeedi
Romania	Elena-Georgina Doana / Ana-Maria Gociu
Spain	Marcos Pérez Outeda / Héctor Fraile Muñoz
Tunisia	Mohammed Kamel Drissi / Mohammed Aymen Ben Salah

== Men ==
=== Group A ===
Team	Pld	W	L	SW	SL	Diff.	Pts	Qualification
Chinese Taipei	2	2	0	4	1	+3	4	Main round
Pakistan	2	1	1	3	2	+1	2	Main round
Mauritius	2	0	2	0	4	-4	0	Main round
~~Brazil~~	0	0	0	0	0	0	0	Withdrew

Team 1	Score	Team 2
11 July 2017
11:10
Chinese Taipei	2–0	Mauritius
15:40
Pakistan	1–2	Chinese Taipei
12 July 2017
12:00
Pakistan	2–0	Mauritius

=== Group B ===
Team	Pld	W	L	SW	SL	Diff.	Pts	Qualification
Russia	3	2	1	5	2	+3	4	Main round
Venezuela	3	2	1	5	3	+2	4	Main round
Thailand	3	2	1	4	3	+1	4	Main round
Togo	3	0	3	0	6	-6	0	Consolation group

Team 1	Score	Team 2
11 July 2017
11:10
Thailand	2–1	Venezuela
Russia	2–0	Togo
14:50
Venezuela	2–1	Russia
15:40
Togo	0–2	Thailand
12 July 2017
11:10
Thailand	0–2	Russia
Venezuela	2–0	Togo

=== Group C ===
Team	Pld	W	L	SW	SL	Diff.	Pts	Qualification
Spain	3	3	0	6	1	+5	6	Main round
Argentina	3	2	1	5	2	+3	4	Main round
Paraguay	3	1	2	2	4	-2	2	Main round
South Africa	3	0	3	0	6	-6	0	Consolation group

Team 1	Score	Team 2
11 July 2017
18:10
Spain	2–0	Paraguay
19:00
Argentina	2–0	South Africa
12 July 2017
09:30
South Africa	0–2	Spain
11:50
Paraguay	0–2	Argentina
15:50
Spain	2–1	Argentina
Paraguay	2–0	South Africa

=== Group D ===
Team	Pld	W	L	SW	SL	Diff.	Pts	Qualification
Italy	3	3	0	6	0	+6	6	Main round
Portugal	3	2	1	4	2	+2	4	Main round
Australia	3	1	2	2	4	-2	2	Main round
New Zealand	3	0	3	0	6	-6	0	Consolation group

Team 1	Score	Team 2
11 July 2017
09:30
Portugal	2–0	Australia
Italy	2–0	New Zealand
14:00
Australia	0–2	Italy
New Zealand	0–2	Portugal
12 July 2017
12:00
Australia	2–0	New Zealand
12:50
Portugal	0–2	Italy

=== Group I ===
Team	Pld	W	L	SW	SL	Diff.	Pts	Qualification
Russia	5	4	1	9	2	+7	8	Quarterfinals
Thailand	5	4	1	8	3	+5	8	Quarterfinals
Venezuela	5	3	2	8	5	+3	6	Quarterfinals
Chinese Taipei	5	2	3	4	7	-3	4	Quarterfinals
Pakistan	5	2	3	5	7	-2	4	9th–15th place
Mauritius	5	0	5	0	10	-10	0	9th–15th place

Team 1	Score	Team 2
13 July 2017
09:30
Chinese Taipei	0–2	Thailand
Pakistan	2–1	Venezuela
Mauritius	0–2	Russia
14:00
Pakistan	0–2	Russia
Chinese Taipei	0–2	Venezuela
Mauritius	0–2	Thailand
14 July 2017
15:40
Chinese Taipei	0–2	Russia
Pakistan	0–2	Thailand
Mauritius	0–2	Venezuela

=== Group II ===
Team	Pld	W	L	SW	SL	Diff.	Pts	Qualification
Spain	5	5	0	10	1	+9	10	Quarterfinals
Italy	5	4	1	8	2	+6	8	Quarterfinals
Argentina	5	3	2	7	5	+2	6	Quarterfinals
Portugal	5	2	3	5	6	-1	4	Quarterfinals
Paraguay	5	1	4	2	8	-6	2	9th–16th place
Australia	5	0	5	0	10	-10	0	9th–16th place

Team 1	Score	Team 2
13 July 2017
11:10
Spain	2–0	Australia
Argentina	2–1	Portugal
Paraguay	0–2	Italy
15:40
Spain	2–0	Portugal
Paraguay	2–0	Australia
Argentina	0–2	Italy
14 July 2017
16:30
Spain	2–0	Italy
Argentina	2–0	Australia
Paraguay	0–2	Portugal

=== Consolation Group ===
Team	Pld	W	L	SW	SL	Diff.	Pts	Qualification
New Zealand	2	2	0	4	0	+4	4	9th–15th place
Togo	2	1	1	2	2	0	2	9th–15th place
South Africa	2	0	2	0	4	-4	0	9th–15th place

Team 1	Score	Team 2
13 July 2017
12:50
Togo	2–0	South Africa
17:20
New Zealand	2–0	South Africa
14 July 2017
12:50
Togo	0–2	New Zealand

=== 9th–15th Placement matches ===
Team 1	Score	Team 2
15 July 2017
09:30
Mauritius	2–0	New Zealand
10:20
Paraguay	2–0	South Africa
12:00
Australia	2–0	Togo

=== 13th–15th Placement matches ===
Team 1	Score	Team 2
15 July 2017
14:50
New Zealand	2–0	South Africa
16 July 2017
09:10
New Zealand	2–1	Togo
12:30
South Africa	0–2	Togo

=== 9th–12th Placement matches ===
Team 1	Score	Team 2
15 July 2017
14:50
Pakistan	2–0	Mauritius
Paraguay	1–2	Australia

=== 11th–12th-place match ===
Team 1	Score	Team 2
16 July 2017
10:50
Mauritius	0–2	Paraguay

=== 9th–10th-place match ===
Team 1	Score	Team 2
16 July 2017
10:00
Pakistan	2–0	Australia

=== Championship bracket ===
Fifth-place match
Venezuela	2
Chinese Taipei	1
Seventh-place match
Portugal	2
Thailand	0

5th – 8th-place semifinals
Portugal	0
Venezuela	2
Chinese Taipei	2
Thailand	0

Quarterfinals
Russia	2
Portugal	0
Italy	2
Venezuela	0
Spain	2
Chinese Taipei	0
Thailand	1
Argentina	2

Semifinals
Russia	0
Italy	2
Spain	2
Argentina	0

Final
Italy	1
Spain	2
Third-place match
Russia	1
Argentina	2

=== Final standings ===
Rank	Team
Gold medal	Spain (1st Title)
Silver medal	Italy
Bronze medal	Argentina
4	Russia
5	Venezuela
6	Chinese Taipei
7	Portugal
8	Thailand
9	Pakistan
10	Australia
11	Paraguay
12	Mauritius (Host)
13	New Zealand
14	Togo
15	South Africa

Qualified for the 2018 Summer Youth Olympics
Qualified for the 2021 Youth Beach Handball World Championship and 2018 Summer Youth Olympics

== Women ==
=== Group A ===
Team	Pld	W	L	SW	SL	Diff.	Pts	Qualification
Hungary	3	3	0	6	1	+5	6	Main round
Argentina	3	2	1	4	3	+1	4	Main round
Croatia	3	1	2	4	4	0	2	Main round
Paraguay	3	0	3	0	6	-6	0	Consolation group

Team 1	Score	Team 2
11 July 2017
12:00
Hungary	2–1	Croatia
16:30
Argentina	2–0	Paraguay
12 July 2017
09:30
Croatia	1–2	Argentina
10:20
Paraguay	0–2	Hungary
15:00
Argentina	0–2	Hungary
Paraguay	0–2	Croatia

=== Group B ===
Team	Pld	W	L	SW	SL	Diff.	Pts	Qualification
Netherlands	1	1	0	2	0	+2	2	Main round
Chinese Taipei	1	0	1	0	2	-2	0	Main round
~~Togo~~	0	0	0	0	0	0	0	Withdrew
~~Brazil~~	0	0	0	0	0	0	0	Withdrew

Team 1	Score	Team 2
11 July 2017
12:00
Netherlands	2–0	Chinese Taipei

=== Group C ===
Team	Pld	W	L	SW	SL	Diff.	Pts	Qualification
China	3	3	0	6	0	+6	6	Main round
Thailand	3	2	1	4	2	+2	4	Main round
Venezuela	3	1	2	2	4	-2	2	Main round
Mauritius	3	0	3	0	6	-6	0	Consolation group

Team 1	Score	Team 2
11 July 2017
12:00
China	2–0	Venezuela
16:30
Venezuela	0–2	Thailand
17:20
Mauritius	0–2	China
12 July 2017
10:20
Thailand	2–0	Mauritius
China	2–0	Thailand
12:50
Venezuela	2–0	Mauritius

=== Group D ===
Team	Pld	W	L	SW	SL	Diff.	Pts	Qualification
Portugal	3	3	0	6	1	+5	6	Main round
Spain	3	2	1	5	2	+3	4	Main round
American Samoa	3	1	2	2	4	-2	2	Main round
Australia	3	0	3	0	6	-6	0	Consolation group

Team 1	Score	Team 2
11 July 2017
10:20
Spain	2–0	American Samoa
Portugal	2–0	Australia
14:50
Australia	0–2	Spain
American Samoa	0–2	Portugal
12 July 2017
12:50
Spain	1–2	Portugal
American Samoa	2–0	Australia

=== Group I ===
Team	Pld	W	L	SW	SL	Diff.	Pts	Qualification
Netherlands	4	4	0	8	2	+6	8	Quarterfinals
Hungary	3	2	1	5	3	+2	4	Quarterfinals
Argentina	4	2	2	5	5	0	4	Quarterfinals
Chinese Taipei	4	1	3	2	6	-4	2	Quarterfinals
Croatia	4	0	4	2	8	-6	0	9th–14th place

Team 1	Score	Team 2
13 July 2017
10:20
Argentina	2–0	Chinese Taipei
Croatia	0–2	Netherlands
14:50
Argentina	1–2	Netherlands
Hungary	2–0	Chinese Taipei
14 July 2017
11:10
Hungary	1–2	Netherlands
Croatia	0–2	Chinese Taipei

=== Group II ===
Team	Pld	W	L	SW	SL	Diff.	Pts	Qualification
Portugal	5	5	0	10	2	+8	10	Quarterfinals
China	5	4	1	8	3	+5	8	Quarterfinals
Spain	5	3	2	8	4	+4	6	Quarterfinals
Thailand	5	2	3	5	6	-1	4	Quarterfinals
Venezuela	5	1	4	2	8	-6	2	9th–14th place
American Samoa	5	0	5	0	10	-10	0	9th–14th place

Team 1	Score	Team 2
13 July 2017
12:00
China	2–0	American Samoa
Thailand	0–2	Spain
Venezuela	0–2	Portugal
16:30
Thailand	1–2	Portugal
Venezuela	2–0	American Samoa
China	2–1	Spain
14 July 2017
12:00
China	0–2	Portugal
Thailand	2–0	American Samoa
Venezuela	0–2	Spain

=== Consolation Group ===
Team	Pld	W	L	SW	SL	Diff.	Pts	Qualification
Paraguay	2	2	0	4	0	+4	4	9th–14th place
Australia	2	1	1	2	2	0	2	9th–14th place
Mauritius	2	0	2	0	4	-4	0	9th–14th place

Team 1	Score	Team 2
13 July 2017
12:50
Paraguay	2–0	Mauritius
17:20
Australia	0–2	Paraguay
14 July 2017
14:50
Mauritius	0–2	Australia

=== 9th–14th placement matches ===
Team 1	Score	Team 2
15 July 2017
11:10
Croatia	2–0	Mauritius
12:50
American Samoa	0–2	Paraguay
Venezuela	2–0	Australia

=== 12th–14th placement matches ===
Team 1	Score	Team 2
15 July 2017
16:30
Mauritius	0–2	Australia
16 July 2017
09:10
American Samoa	2–1	Australia
12:30
Mauritius	0–2	American Samoa

=== 9th–11th placement matches ===
Team 1	Score	Team 2
15 July 2017
16:30
Croatia	2–0	Venezuela
16 July 2017
09:10
Paraguay	0–2	Venezuela
11:40
Croatia	2–0	Paraguay

=== Championship bracket ===
Fifth-place match
Thailand	0
Spain	2
Seventh-place match
China	2
Chinese Taipei	0

5th – 8th-place semifinals
Thailand	2
China	1
Chinese Taipei	0
Spain	2

Quarterfinals
Netherlands	2
Thailand	0
China	1
Argentina	2
Portugal	2
Chinese Taipei	1
Hungary	2
Spain	1

Semifinals
Netherlands	2
Argentina	0
Portugal	0
Hungary	2

Final
Netherlands	1
Hungary	2
Third-place match
Argentina	2
Portugal	1

=== Final standings ===
Rank	Team
Gold medal	Hungary (1st Title)
Silver medal	Netherlands
Bronze medal	Argentina
4	Portugal
5	Spain
6	Thailand
7	China
8	Chinese Taipei
9	Croatia
10	Venezuela
11	Paraguay
12	American Samoa
13	Australia
14	Mauritius (Host)

Qualified for the 2018 Summer Youth Olympics
Qualified for the 2021 Youth Beach Handball World Championship and 2018 Summer Youth Olympics

== Controversies ==
Two days before the departure of the IHF nominees to Mauritius, the International Handball Federation received a letter from the President of Mauritius Handball Federation (MHF) asking for a support of CHF 300,000, in addition to the participation fees, to meet the expenses of the organisation of the Championship. The request was declined by the IHF, asking the President of Mauritius Handball Federation to fulfil the provisions of the signed championship contract. Accommodation for both the teams and IHF nominees was below IHF standards, and that the MHF failed to pay off the company that provided services of accommodation, catering and flight booking. Eventually, the IHF paid for the entire accommodation of the teams as well as the nominees after price negotiations made by the Managing Director.

In the terms of transportation, the organiser did not fulfil the agreed concept of transportation for the teams, but following an intervention of the Minister of Sports Mr. Stephan Toussaint more vehicles were made available. In addition, the three venues were not constructed while the main venue was not completely done. The Chairman of the IHF Beach Handball Working Group was authorised by President Moustafa to negotiate the price of the venue construction; and eventually four venues were reduced to three and the IHF nominees were cleaning and setting up the two venues to reduce the cost. Due to the absence of the Local Organising Committee, including the President and remaining representatives of Mauritius Handball Federation, at the event, the full organisation was taken over by the IHF.

As for the competition, both Brazilian teams and the Togolese women’s team withdrew their participation shortly before the event.

Due to the payments made by the IHF an amount of CHF 173,619.27 needs to be reimbursed to the IHF by Mauritius Handball Federation. The IHF Executive Committee proposed in its meeting in Tbilisi on 17 August 2017 to wait for an official communication from Mauritius Handball Federation to explain the situation occurred before submitting the issue to the IHF legal bodies for further decisions.
