= 2023 Asian Beach Handball Championship =

2023 Asian Men's & Women's Beach Handball Championship
Tournament details
- Host country: Indonesia
- Dates: 10–19 March 2023
- Teams: 11 (M), 4 (W) (from 1 confederation)

Final positions
- Champions: Qatar (M); Vietnam (W)
- Runners-up: Oman (M); Philippines (W)
- Third place: Iran (M); Indonesia (W)
- Fourth place: Vietnam (M); Hong Kong (W)

The 2023 Asian Beach Handball Championship was the 9th edition of the championship held from 10 to 19 March 2023 in South Kuta, Indonesia sanctioned by the Asian Handball Federation (AHF).

Qatar and Vietnam won the men's and women's championships respectively.

== Participating nations ==
Men's

- China
- Hong Kong
- Indonesia (hosts)
- Iran
- Kuwait
- Oman
- Philippines
- Qatar
- Saudi Arabia
- South Korea
- Vietnam

Women's

- ~~China~~ (withdrew)
- Hong Kong
- Indonesia (hosts)
- Philippines
- Vietnam

== Draw ==
The draw will be held on 24 February 2025 at the City Seasons Muscat Hotel in Muscat, Oman.

== Venue ==
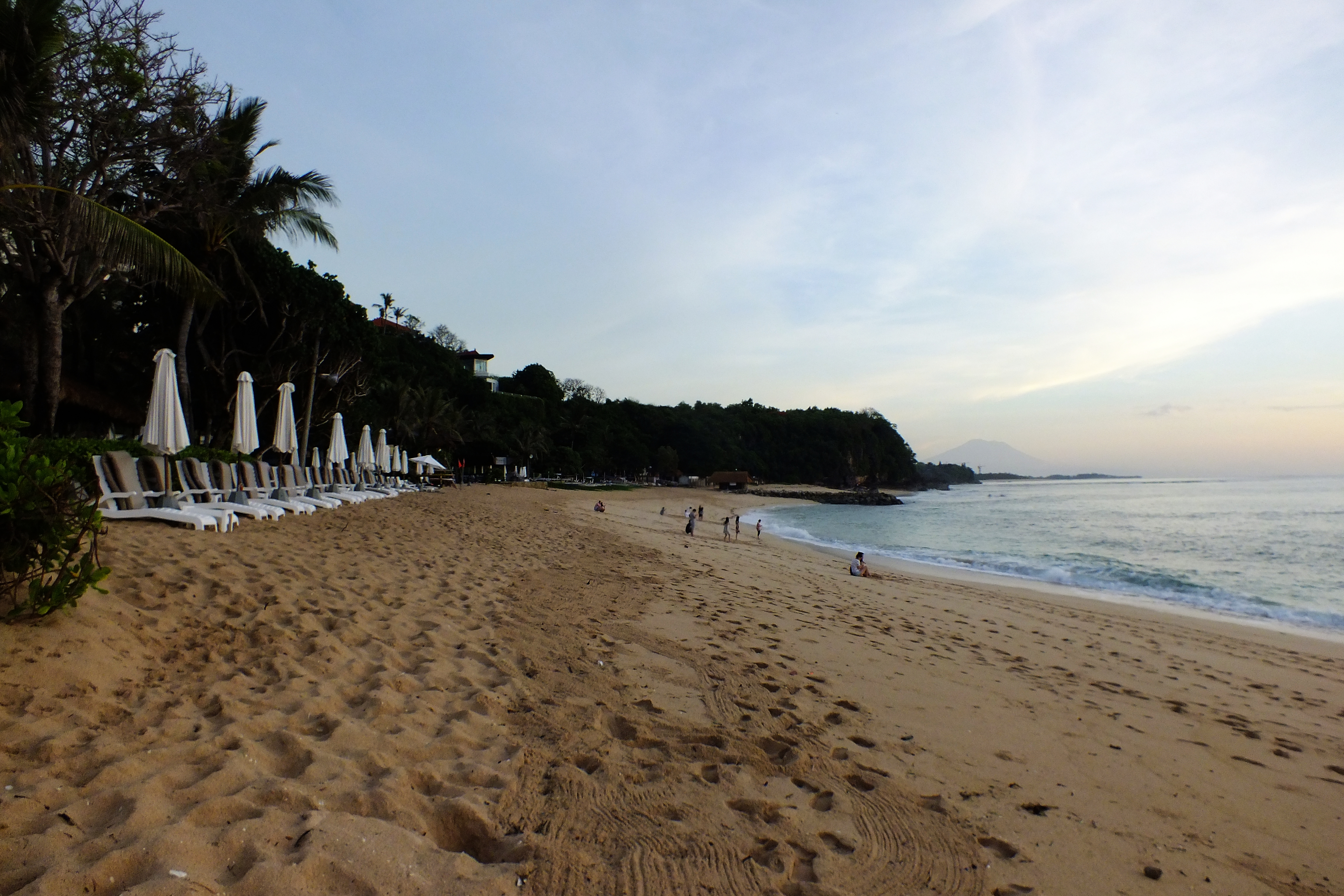
Nusa Dua beach

Games were held at the Nusa Dua beach.

== Results ==
=== Men's tournament ===
==== Preliminary round ====
===== Group A =====
| Pos | Team | Pld | W | L | Pts | SW | SL | SR | SPW | SPL | SPR | Qualification |
|---|---|---|---|---|---|---|---|---|---|---|---|---|
| 1 | Qatar | 4 | 4 | 0 | 8 | 8 | 0 | MAX | 189 | 119 | 1.588 | Semifinals |
| 2 | Iran | 4 | 3 | 1 | 6 | 6 | 3 | 2.000 | 176 | 126 | 1.397 | Semifinals |
| 3 | Philippines | 4 | 2 | 2 | 4 | 4 | 4 | 1.000 | 151 | 139 | 1.086 | 5–8th place semifinals |
| 4 | Saudi Arabia | 4 | 1 | 3 | 2 | 3 | 7 | 0.429 | 112 | 167 | 0.671 | 5–8th place semifinals |
| 5 | South Korea | 4 | 0 | 4 | 0 | 1 | 8 | 0.125 | 102 | 179 | 0.570 | Ninth place game |

Source: AHF

| 10 March 2023 | South Korea | 0–2 | Qatar |
| 10 March 2023 | Report |

| 10 March 2023 | Saudi Arabia | 1–2 | Iran |
| 10 March 2023 | Report |

| 11 March 2023 | Philippines | 0–2 | Qatar |
| 11 March 2023 | Report |

| 11 March 2023 | South Korea | 0–2 | Iran |
| 11 March 2023 | Report |

| 12 March 2023 | South Korea | 0–2 | Philippines |
| 12 March 2023 | Report |

| 12 March 2023 | Qatar | 2–0 | Saudi Arabia |
| 12 March 2023 | Report |

| 14 March 2023 | Saudi Arabia | 2–1 | South Korea |
| 14 March 2023 | Report |

| 14 March 2023 | Philippines | 0–2 | Iran |
| 14 March 2023 | Report |

| 15 March 2023 | Saudi Arabia | 0–2 | Philippines |
| 15 March 2023 | Report |

| 15 March 2023 | Iran | 0–2 | Qatar |
| 15 March 2023 | Report |

===== Group B =====
| Pos | Team | Pld | W | L | Pts | SW | SL | SR | SPW | SPL | SPR | Qualification |
|---|---|---|---|---|---|---|---|---|---|---|---|---|
| 1 | Oman | 5 | 5 | 0 | 10 | 10 | 1 | 10.000 | 209 | 131 | 1.595 | Semifinals |
| 2 | Vietnam | 5 | 4 | 1 | 8 | 9 | 2 | 4.500 | 216 | 107 | 2.019 | Semifinals |
| 3 | Kuwait | 5 | 3 | 2 | 6 | 6 | 5 | 1.200 | 154 | 129 | 1.194 | 5–8th place semifinals |
| 4 | Indonesia | 5 | 2 | 3 | 4 | 4 | 7 | 0.571 | 158 | 194 | 0.814 | 5–8th place semifinals |
| 5 | China | 5 | 1 | 4 | 2 | 4 | 8 | 0.500 | 166 | 229 | 0.725 | Ninth place game |
| 6 | Hong Kong | 5 | 0 | 5 | 0 | 0 | 10 | 0.000 | 102 | 215 | 0.474 | |

Source: AHF

| 10 March 2023 | Indonesia | 2–1 | China |
| 10 March 2023 | Report |

| 10 March 2023 | Oman | 2–0 | Hong Kong |
| 10 March 2023 | Report |

| 10 March 2023 | Vietnam | 2–0 | Kuwait |
| 10 March 2023 | Report |

| 11 March 2023 | Kuwait | 2–0 | Indonesia |
| 11 March 2023 | Report |

| 11 March 2023 | Vietnam | 1–2 | Oman |
| 11 March 2023 | Report |

| 11 March 2023 | Hong Kong | 0–2 | China |
| 11 March 2023 | Report |

| 12 March 2023 | Indonesia | 2–0 | Hong Kong |
| 12 March 2023 | Report |

| 12 March 2023 | China | 0–2 | Vietnam |
| 12 March 2023 | Report |

| 12 March 2023 | Oman | 2–0 | Kuwait |
| 12 March 2023 | Report |

| 14 March 2023 | Kuwait | 2–1 | China |
| 14 March 2023 | Report |

| 14 March 2023 | Hong Kong | 0–2 | Vietnam |
| 14 March 2023 | Report |

| 15 March 2023 | Indonesia | 0–2 | Vietnam |
| 15 March 2023 | Report |

| 15 March 2023 | Hong Kong | 0–2 | Kuwait |
| 15 March 2023 | Report |

| 15 March 2023 | China | 0–2 | Oman |
| 15 March 2023 | Report |

==== Knockout stage ====
===== Bracket =====
Championship bracket

Semi-finals
17 March
Qatar | 2
Vietnam | 0
17 March
Oman | 2
Iran | 0

Final
19 March
Qatar | 2
Oman | 0
Third place
19 March
Vietnam | 0
Iran | 2

Fifth place bracket

5–8th place semifinals
17 March
Philippines | 2
Indonesia | 0
17 March
Kuwait | 1
Saudi Arabia | 2

Fifth place game
19 March
Philippines | 2
Saudi Arabia | 0
Seventh place game
19 March
Indonesia | 2
Kuwait | 0

Ninth place game

| Ninth place game |
| 17 March |
| South Korea | 2 |
| China | 0 |

===== 5–10th place =====
====== Tenth place game ======
| 17 March 2023 | South Korea | 2–0 | China |
| 17 March 2023 | Report |

====== 5–8th place semifinals ======
| 17 March 2023 | Philippines | 2–0 | Indonesia |
| 17 March 2023 | Report |

| 17 March 2023 | Kuwait | 1–2 | Saudi Arabia |
| 17 March 2023 | Report |

====== Seventh place game ======
| 19 March 2023 | Indonesia | 2–0 | Kuwait |
| 19 March 2023 | Report |

====== Fifth place game ======
| 19 March 2023 | Philippines | 2–0 | Saudi Arabia |
| 19 March 2023 | Report |

====== Semifinals ======
| 17 March 2023 | Qatar | 2–0 | Vietnam |
| 17 March 2023 | Report |

| 17 March 2023 | Oman | 2–0 | Iran |
| 17 March 2023 | Report |

====== Third place game ======
| 19 March 2023 | Vietnam | 0–2 | Iran |
| 19 March 2023 | Report |

====== Final ======
| 19 March 2023 | Qatar | 2–0 | Oman |
| 19 March 2023 | Report |

=== Women's tournament ===
==== Double round robin ====
| Pos | Team | Pld | W | L | Pts | SW | SL | SR | SPW | SPL | SPR | Qualification |
|---|---|---|---|---|---|---|---|---|---|---|---|---|
| 1 | Vietnam | 6 | 6 | 0 | 12 | 12 | 0 | MAX | 255 | 122 | 2.090 | Champions |
| 2 | Philippines | 6 | 4 | 2 | 8 | 8 | 5 | 1.600 | 174 | 177 | 0.983 | Runners-up |
| 3 | Indonesia | 6 | 1 | 5 | 2 | 3 | 10 | 0.300 | 170 | 226 | 0.752 | Third place |
| 4 | Hong Kong | 6 | 1 | 5 | 2 | 2 | 10 | 0.200 | 133 | 207 | 0.643 | |

Source: AHF

| 10 March 2023 | Philippines | 0–2 | Vietnam |
| 10 March 2023 | Report |

| 11 March 2023 | Philippines | 2–1 | Indonesia |
| 11 March 2023 | Report |

| 11 March 2023 | Hong Kong | 0–2 | Vietnam |
| 11 March 2023 | Report |

| 12 March 2023 | Indonesia | 0–2 | Vietnam |
| 12 March 2023 | Report |

| 12 March 2023 | Philippines | 2–0 | Hong Kong |
| 12 March 2023 | Report |

| 14 March 2023 | Indonesia | 2–0 | Hong Kong |
| 14 March 2023 | Report |

| 14 March 2023 | Vietnam | 2–0 | Philippines |
| 14 March 2023 | Report |

| 15 March 2023 | Indonesia | 0–2 | Philippines |
| 15 March 2023 | Report |

| 15 March 2023 | Vietnam | 2–0 | Hong Kong |
| 15 March 2023 | Report |

| 17 March 2023 | Hong Kong | 2–0 | Indonesia |
| 17 March 2023 | Report |

| 18 March 2023 | Vietnam | 2–0 | Indonesia |
| 18 March 2023 | Report |

| 18 March 2023 | Hong Kong | 0–2 | Philippines |
| 18 March 2023 | Report |

== Final ranking ==
Men's tournament

| Rank | Team |
|---|---|
| 1st place, gold medalist(s) | Qatar |
| 2nd place, silver medalist(s) | Oman |
| 3rd place, bronze medalist(s) | Iran |
| 4 | Vietnam |
| 5 | Philippines |
| 6 | Saudi Arabia |
| 7 | Indonesia |
| 8 | Kuwait |
| 9 | South Korea |
| 10 | China |
| 11 | Hong Kong |

Women's tournament

| Rank | Team |
|---|---|
| 1st place, gold medalist(s) | Vietnam |
| 2nd place, silver medalist(s) | Philippines |
| 3rd place, bronze medalist(s) | Indonesia |
| 4 | Hong Kong |
