= New Zealand men's national beach handball team =

New Zealand

Information
- Association: New Zealand Handball Federation
- Coach: Tim Rayner
- Captain: James Cochrane
- Most caps: Thomas Roxburgh (69)
- Ranking: #1

Colours
Home	Away	Alternate

Results

World Games
- Appearances: 1 (First in 2022)
- Best result: 7th (2022)

World Championship
- Appearances: 2 (First in 2018)
- Best result: 14th (2022)
- Last updated on Unknown.

The New Zealand Men's Beach Handball team is the national team of New Zealand. It takes part in international beach handball competitions.

In 2016 New Zealand Men's Beach Handball team won their first international game against Australia in a shootout at Coolangatta, Gold Coast, Australia. They went on to lose Game 2 and miss qualification for the World Champs.

In 2018, New Zealand received a wild card entry to the 2018 Beach Handball World Championships in Kazan, Russia. They finished 16th in their first outing, taking Vietnam to penalties and having narrow losses to USA, Australia and Argentina.

At the 2022 Oceania Qualification tournament held at Coolangatta, Gold Coast, Australia, New Zealand beat Australia in Game 1, lost to Australia in Game 2 and beat Australia in a Game 3 shootout to win entry to the 2022 Beach Handball World Championships in June in Crete, Greece and the 2022 World Games in Birmingham, Alabama, USA in July.

== International results ==
=== World Championships ===
Year	Results
(Egypt) 2004	Did not participate
(Brazil) 2006	Did not participate
(Spain) 2008	Did not participate
(Turkey) 2010	Did not participate
(Oman) 2012	Did not participate
(Brazil) 2014	Did not participate
(Hungary) 2016	Did not even try
(Russia) 2018	2nd place
(Greece) 2022	1st place
Total	2/9

=== Oceania Championship ===
Year	Results
(Australia) 2013	2nd place
(Australia) 2016	2nd place
(Australia) 2018	2nd place
(Australia) 2019	2nd place
(Australia) 2022	1st place
Total	5/5

=== World Games ===
Year	Results
(Japan) 2001	Did not participate
(Germany) 2005	Did not participate
(Taiwan) 2009	Did not participate
(Colombia) 2013	Did not participate
(Poland) 2017	Did not qualify
(United States) 2022	7th place
Total	1/6

== Current Team ==
The current team for the 2022 Beach Handball World Championship.

Number	Player	Region	Position
3	James Cochrane	Wellington	Specialist / Centre
5	Gus Hamilton	Otago	Specialist / Wing
12	Olly Donaldson	Otago	Pivot
17	Peter Ellis	Canterbury	Defence
19	Phil Ellis	Canterbury	Specialist / Wing
20	Paul Ireland	Wellington	Wing
26	Thomas Roxburgh	Wellington	Goal Keeper
27	Cameron Ross	Wellington	Defence
34	Alex Brown	Canterbury	Goal Keeper
61	Max Brookes	Wellington	Defence / Wing

== World Championships ==
=== 2018 World Championship ===
The 2018 World Championship was hosted in Kazan, Russia. It was New Zealand's first world championship appearance after receiving a wild card entry to the tournament. The team finished 16th after group stage losses to Hungary, Spain and a penalty shoot-out loss to Vietnam, followed by losses to The United States of America, Australia, Argentina, Qatar, Vietnam and Uruguay.

==== Results ====
===== Group stage =====
24 July 2018; 11:30	Hungary	2–0	New Zealand	Beach Sports Complex, Kazan; Referees: Wanderson Oliveira, Fabiano Carvalho (BRA)
24 July 2018; 11:30	(19–12, 24–12); Report			Beach Sports Complex, Kazan; Referees: Wanderson Oliveira, Fabiano Carvalho (BRA)

24 July 2018; 16:30	New Zealand	0–2	Spain	Beach Sports Complex, Kazan; Referees: Ana Carina Barbosa, Nadia Machado (POR)
24 July 2018; 16:30	(10–24, 12–22); Report			Beach Sports Complex, Kazan; Referees: Ana Carina Barbosa, Nadia Machado (POR)

25 July 2018; 09:30	Vietnam	2–1	New Zealand	Beach Sports Complex, Kazan; Referees: Dávid Palkovits, Gabor Szilvási (HUN)
25 July 2018; 09:30	(18–14, 16–17, 6–5); Report			Beach Sports Complex, Kazan; Referees: Dávid Palkovits, Gabor Szilvási (HUN)

===== Consolation round =====
26 July 2018; 09:00	New Zealand	0–2	United States	Beach Sports Complex, Kazan; Referees: Michail Mertinian, Evangelos Syrepisios (GRE)
26 July 2018; 09:00	(18–20, 16–20); Report			Beach Sports Complex, Kazan; Referees: Michail Mertinian, Evangelos Syrepisios (GRE)

26 July 2018; 14:00	Australia	2–0	New Zealand	Beach Sports Complex, Kazan; Referees: Cao Hongjun, Xu Jian (CHN)
26 July 2018; 14:00	(17–16, 22–18); Report			Beach Sports Complex, Kazan; Referees: Cao Hongjun, Xu Jian (CHN)

27 July 2018; 09:00	Argentina	2–0	New Zealand	Beach Sports Complex, Kazan; Referees: Ana Carina Barbosa, Nadia Machado (POR)
27 July 2018; 09:00	(20–17, 19–18); Report			Beach Sports Complex, Kazan; Referees: Ana Carina Barbosa, Nadia Machado (POR)

===== Placement Round =====
28 July 2018; 09:00	Qatar	2–0	New Zealand	Beach Sports Complex, Kazan; Referees: Ana Carina Barbosa, Nadia Machado (POR)
28 July 2018; 09:00	(20–16, 20–8); Report			Beach Sports Complex, Kazan; Referees: Ana Carina Barbosa, Nadia Machado (POR)

28 July 2018; 14:10	New Zealand	0–2	Vietnam	Beach Sports Complex, Kazan; Referees: Pablo Martínez, Luiz Monico (URU)
28 July 2018; 14:10	(14–16, 8–15); Report			Beach Sports Complex, Kazan; Referees: Pablo Martínez, Luiz Monico (URU)

29 July 2018; 09:00	New Zealand	0–2	Uruguay	Beach Sports Complex, Kazan; Referees: Wanderson Oliveira, Fabiano Carvalho (BRA)
29 July 2018; 09:00	(18–21, 20–23); Report			Beach Sports Complex, Kazan; Referees: Wanderson Oliveira, Fabiano Carvalho (BRA)

=== 2022 World Championship ===
The 2022 World Championship was hosted in Crete, Greece. It was New Zealand's second appearance in a world championship, the first time the nation qualified through the Oceania Beach Handball Championships. The team finished 14th having recorded their first world championship wins against Puerto Rico and Egypt.

==== Results ====
===== Group stage =====
21 June 2022; 09:50	Portugal	2–0	New Zealand	Court 3 Referees: Mohamed Ben Salah (TUN), Mohamed Drissi (TUN)
21 June 2022; 09:50	(32–20, 25–16); Report			Court 3 Referees: Mohamed Ben Salah (TUN), Mohamed Drissi (TUN)

21 June 2022; 15:50	New Zealand	0–2	Brazil	Court 3 Referees: Luciano Cardone (ITA), Sebatiano Manuele (ITA)
21 June 2022; 15:50	(16–26, 16–26); Report			Court 3 Referees: Luciano Cardone (ITA), Sebatiano Manuele (ITA)

22 June 2022; 15:50	Qatar	2–0	New Zealand	Court 3 Referees: Sylwia Bartkowiak (POL), Weronika Łakomy (POL)
22 June 2022; 15:50	(30–14, 28–10); Report			Court 3 Referees: Sylwia Bartkowiak (POL), Weronika Łakomy (POL)

===== Consolation round =====
23 June 2022; 09:00	Ecuador	2–0	New Zealand	Court 3 Referees: Sydiney Dos Santos (BRA), Flavio Asis (BRA)
23 June 2022; 09:00	(19–14, 25–24); Report			Court 3 Referees: Sydiney Dos Santos (BRA), Flavio Asis (BRA)

23 June 2022; 15:30	New Zealand	2–0	Puerto Rico	Court 2 Referees: Khalid Al-Hail (QAT), Ali Al-Yafei (QAT)
23 June 2022; 15:30	(22–20, 22–20); Report			Court 2 Referees: Khalid Al-Hail (QAT), Ali Al-Yafei (QAT)

24 June 2022; 09:30	Egypt	2–0	New Zealand	Court 3 Referees: Pedro Ortega (VEN), Miguel Aular (VEN)
24 June 2022; 09:30	(25–18, 12–10); Report			Court 3 Referees: Pedro Ortega (VEN), Miguel Aular (VEN)

===== Placement Round =====
25 June 2022; 10:40	United States	2–1	New Zealand	Court 3 Referees: Pedro Ortega (VEN), Miguel Aular (VEN)
25 June 2022; 10:40	(26–20, 23–24, 5–4); Report			Court 3 Referees: Pedro Ortega (VEN), Miguel Aular (VEN)

25 June 2022; 17:30	New Zealand	2–1	Egypt	Court 3 Referees: Mathieu Fanack (FRA), Cédric Daré (FRA)
25 June 2022; 17:30	(12–23, 23–20, 7–4); Report			Court 3 Referees: Mathieu Fanack (FRA), Cédric Daré (FRA)

26 June 2022; 11:10	Ecuador	2–1	New Zealand	Court 3 Referees: Sylwia Bartkowiak (POL), Weronika Łakomy (POL)
26 June 2022; 11:10	(22–14, 22–24, 8–2); Report			Court 3 Referees: Sylwia Bartkowiak (POL), Weronika Łakomy (POL)

== Oceania Championships ==
Oceania Beach Handball Championships
Year	Host	Match	Home	Result	Away
2022	(Australia) Coolangatta	Game 1	Australia	1:2 [18:20, 22:14, 6:7]	New Zealand
2022	(Australia) Coolangatta	Game 2	Australia	2:0 [20:8, 16:10]	New Zealand
2022	(Australia) Coolangatta	Game 3	Australia	1:2 [14:15, 16:10, 8:9]	New Zealand
