= 2025 Asian Beach Handball Championship =

2025 Asian Men's & Women's Beach Handball Championship
Tournament details
- Host country: Oman
- Venue: 1 (in 1 host city)
- Dates: 6–15 May 2025
- Teams: 11 (M), 4 (W) (from 1 confederation)

Final positions
- Champions: Oman (M); Vietnam (W)
- Runners-up: Iran (M); Philippines (W)
- Third place: Pakistan (M); India (W)
- Fourth place: Jordan (M); Hong Kong (W)

The 2025 Asian Beach Handball Championship is the 10th edition of the championship held from 6 to 15 May 2025 in Muscat, Oman sanctioned by the Asian Handball Federation (AHF). Games were held at the Sultan Qaboos Sports Complex.

Oman and Vietnam won the men's and women's championships respectively.

== Participating nations ==
Men's

- Hong Kong
- India
- Iran
- Iraq
- Jordan
- Maldives
- Oman (hosts)
- Pakistan
- Philippines
- Qatar
- Saudi Arabia

Women's

- Hong Kong
- India
- Philippines
- Vietnam

== Draw ==
The draw was held on 24 February 2025 at the City Seasons Muscat Hotel in Muscat, Oman.

Men's Championship		Women's Championship
Group A Team Oman Saudi Arabia Hong Kong Maldives	Group B Team Iran Philippines Jordan Pakistan India	Group A Team Vietnam Philippines Hong Kong India

== Final Ranking ==
Men's tournament

Rank	Team
1st place, gold medalist(s)	Oman
2nd place, silver medalist(s)	Iran
3rd place, bronze medalist(s)	Pakistan
4	Jordan
5	Philippines
6	Saudi Arabia
7	Maldives
8	Hong Kong
9	India

Women's tournament

Rank	Team
1st place, gold medalist(s)	Vietnam
2nd place, silver medalist(s)	Philippines
3rd place, bronze medalist(s)	India
4	Hong Kong
