= Libya men's national beach handball team =

Libya

Information
- Association: Libyan Handball Federation

Colours
Home	Away

Results

World Championship
- Appearances: 2 (First in 2008)
- Best result: 11th (2010)
- Last updated on Unknown.

The Libya men's national beach handball team is the national team of Libya. It takes part in international beach handball competitions.

== World Championships results ==
- 2008 – 12th place
- 2010 – 11th place
