= Beach handball at the 2018 Summer Youth Olympics =

Beach handball at the III Summer Youth Olympic Games
- Pictogram for beach handball
- Venue: Parque Sarmiento
- Dates: 7–13 October
- No. of events: 2 (1 boys and 1 girls)
- Competitors: 215 (108 boys and 107 girls) from 15 nations

Beach handball at the 2018 Summer Youth Olympics was held from 7 to 13 October in Buenos Aires, Argentina.

20 beach handball teams, total of 200 athletes, participated in the tournament. The beach handball competition took place at the Parque Sarmiento in Saavedra.

== Qualification ==
Each National Olympic Committee (NOC) is limited to participation in 1 team sports (Futsal, Beach handball, Field Hockey, and Rugby Sevens) per each gender with the exception of the host country who can enter one team per sport. Also at Beach handball each NOC can enter a maximum of 1 team of 10 athletes per both genders. To be eligible to participate in the Youth Olympics, athletes must have been born between 1 January 2000 and 31 December 2003.

As hosts, Argentina has the right to directly qualify 1 team per both genders on account of PATHF (Pan-America) quota. The best ranked NOC in each of the 5 continents from Youth Beach Handball World Championship will obtain quota place.

- 3 quota per each genderare giving to EHF (Europe).
- 2 quota per each genderare giving to PATHF (Pan-America).
- 2 quota per each genderare giving to AHF (Asia).
- 1 quota per each genderare giving to CAHB (Africa) and Oceania (OCHF).
- 1 quota for girls' event to host country, the member of PATHF (Pan-America).
- additional 1 quota for boys' event will reallocat to PATHF (Pan-America).

=== Boys' qualification ===
Mean of qualification	Date	Host	Vacancies	Qualified
Host nation	—	—	1	Argentina
African Qualifier	11–16 July 2017	Mauritius	1	Mauritius
Americas Qualifier	11–16 July 2017	Mauritius	2	Venezuela; Paraguay
Asian Qualifier	11–16 July 2017	Mauritius	2	Chinese Taipei; Thailand
European Qualifier	11–16 July 2017	Mauritius	3	Spain; Italy^{A} Portugal^{A}
Oceanian Qualifier	11–16 July 2017	Mauritius	~~1~~ 0	—
Reallocation	—	—	3	Uruguay; Hungary; Croatia
Total			12	

^A Italy decided to compete in beach handball and Russia decided to compete in futsal and thus the quota was reallocated to the third best placed team from Europe, Portugal.
^B Australia was the highest ranking Oceania team, but the nation selected to use its team sports quotas in boys' field hockey. As such, New Zealand goes in its place as the next highest ranked Oceania nation. Oceania countries declined to participate and this quota was reallocated.

=== Girls' qualification ===
Mean of qualification	Date	Host	Vacancies	Qualified
Host nation	—	—	1	Argentina
African Qualifier	11–16 July 2017	Mauritius	1	Mauritius
Americas Qualifier	11–16 July 2017	Mauritius	2	Venezuela; Paraguay
Asian Qualifier	11–16 July 2017	Mauritius	2	Chinese Taipei; Hong Kong^{C}
European Qualifier	11–16 July 2017	Mauritius	3	Hungary; Netherlands; Croatia^{C}
Oceanian Qualifier	11–16 July 2017	Mauritius	1	American Samoa
Reallocation	—	—	2	Russia; Turkey
Total			12	

^C China decided to participate in field hockey. Portugal and Thailand decided to compete in futsal.

== Medal summary ==
Argentinas girls team at the medal's ceremony

=== Medal table ===
* Host nation (Argentina)

Rank	Nation	Gold	Silver	Bronze	Total
1	Argentina*	1	0	1	2
2	Spain	1	0	0	1
3	Croatia	0	1	0	1
3	Portugal	0	1	0	1
5	Hungary	0	0	1	1
Totals (5 entries)		2	2	2	6

=== Medalists ===
Event	Gold	Silver	Bronze
Boys	Spain	Portugal	Argentina
Girls	Argentina	Croatia	Hungary
