= Asian Beach Handball Championship =

Handball competition

- Sport: Beach Handball
- Founded: 2004
- First season: 2004
- Continents: 1
- Most recent champions: Oman (men); Vietnam (women)
- Most titles: Qatar (men; 6 titles); Thailand; Vietnam (women; 3 titles)

The Asian Beach Handball Championship is the official competition for senior men's and women's national beach handball teams of Asia.

== Men ==
=== Summary ===
Year	Host	Final			Third place match		
Year	Host	Champion	Score	Runner-up	Third place	Score	Fourth place
2004; Details	(Oman); Muscat	Oman	No playoffs	Bahrain	Pakistan	No playoffs	Iran
2007; Details	(Iran); Bandar Abbas	Pakistan	No playoffs	Iran	Japan	No playoffs	None awarded
2011; Details	(Oman); Muscat	Qatar	No playoffs	Oman	Kuwait	No playoffs	Pakistan
2013; Details	Hong Kong	Qatar	No playoffs	Oman	Bahrain	No playoffs	Thailand
2015; Details	(Oman); Muscat	Qatar	No playoffs	Oman	Bahrain	No playoffs	Pakistan
2017; Details	(Thailand); Pattaya	Qatar	2–0	Oman	Iran	2–1	Vietnam
2019; Details	(China); Weihai	Qatar	2–0	Oman	Iran	2–1	Vietnam
2022; Details	(Iran); Tehran	Iran	No playoffs	Qatar	Vietnam	No playoffs	Oman
2023; Details	(Indonesia); South Kuta	Qatar	2–0	Oman	Iran	2–0	Vietnam
2025; Details	(Oman); Muscat	Oman	2–0	Iran	Pakistan	2–1	Jordan

=== Medal table ===
Rank	Nation	Gold	Silver	Bronze	Total
1	Qatar	6	1	0	7
2	Oman	2	6	0	8
3	Iran	1	2	3	6
4	Pakistan	1	0	2	3
5	Bahrain	0	1	2	3
6	Japan	0	0	1	1
6	Kuwait	0	0	1	1
6	Vietnam	0	0	1	1
Totals (8 entries)		10	10	10	30

=== Participating nations ===
Nation	(Oman) 2004	(Iran) 2007	(Oman) 2011	(Hong Kong) 2013	(Oman) 2015	(Thailand) 2017	(China) 2019	(Iran) 2022	(Indonesia) 2023	(Oman) 2025	Years
Afghanistan						9th	11th				2
Bahrain	2nd			3rd	3rd						3
China									10th		1
Chinese Taipei						5th	7th				2
Hong Kong				5th					11th	8th	3
India								6th		9th	2
Indonesia							12th		7th		2
Iran	4th	2nd	5th		5th	3rd	3rd	1st	3rd	2nd	9
Japan		3rd					10th				2
Jordan										4th	1
Kuwait			3rd						8th		2
Maldives										7th	1
Oman	1st		2nd	2nd	2nd	2nd	2nd	4th	2nd	1st	9
Pakistan	3rd	1st	4th		4th		6th			3rd	6
Philippines							8th	5th	5th	5th	4
Qatar			1st	1st	1st	1st	1st	2nd	1st		7
Saudi Arabia							9th		6th	6th	3
South Korea									9th		1
Thailand				4th		6th	5th				3
United Arab Emirates						7th					1
Uzbekistan						8th					1
Vietnam				5th	6th	4th	4th	3rd	4th		6
Total	4	3	5	6	6	9	12	6	11	9	

== Women ==
=== Summary ===
Year	Host	Final			Third place match		
Year	Host	Champion	Score	Runner-up	Third place	Score	Fourth place
2004; Details	(Japan); Tamura	Japan	2–0	Hong Kong	None awarded		
2013; Details	Hong Kong	Thailand	No playoffs	Chinese Taipei	China	No playoffs	Vietnam
2015; Details	Oman	Thailand	No playoffs	Chinese Taipei	Vietnam	No playoffs	Jordan
2017; Details	(Thailand); Pattaya	Thailand	No playoffs	Vietnam	Chinese Taipei	No playoffs	China
2019; Details	(China); Weihai	China	No playoffs	Vietnam	Chinese Taipei	No playoffs	Thailand
2022; Details	(Thailand); Bangkok	Vietnam	No playoffs	Thailand	India	No playoffs	None awarded
2023; Details	(Indonesia); South Kuta	Vietnam	No playoffs	Philippines	Indonesia	No playoffs	Hong Kong
2025; Details	(Oman); Muscat	Vietnam	No playoffs	Philippines	India	No playoffs	Hong Kong

=== Medal table ===
Rank	Nation	Gold	Silver	Bronze	Total
1	Vietnam	3	2	1	6
2	Thailand	3	1	0	4
3	China	1	0	1	2
4	Japan	1	0	0	1
5	Chinese Taipei	0	2	2	4
6	Philippines	0	2	0	2
7	Hong Kong	0	1	0	1
8	India	0	0	2	2
9	Indonesia	0	0	1	1
Totals (9 entries)		8	8	7	23

=== Participating nations ===
Nation	(Oman) 2004	(Hong Kong) 2013	(Oman) 2015	(Thailand) 2017	(China) 2019	(Thailand) 2022	(Indonesia) 2023	(Oman) 2025	Years
China		3rd		4th	1st				3
Chinese Taipei		2nd	2nd	3rd	3rd				4
Hong Kong	2nd	5th			5th		4th	4th	5
India						3rd		3rd	2
Indonesia							3rd		1
Japan	1st				6th				2
Jordan			4th						1
Philippines							2nd	2nd	2
Qatar		6th							1
Thailand		1st	1st	1st	4th	2nd			5
Turkmenistan			5th						1
Vietnam		4th	3rd	2nd	2nd	1st	1st	1st	7
Total	2	6	5	4	6	3	4	4	
