= 2016 Oceania Beach Handball Championship =

Sports event in Queensland, Australia

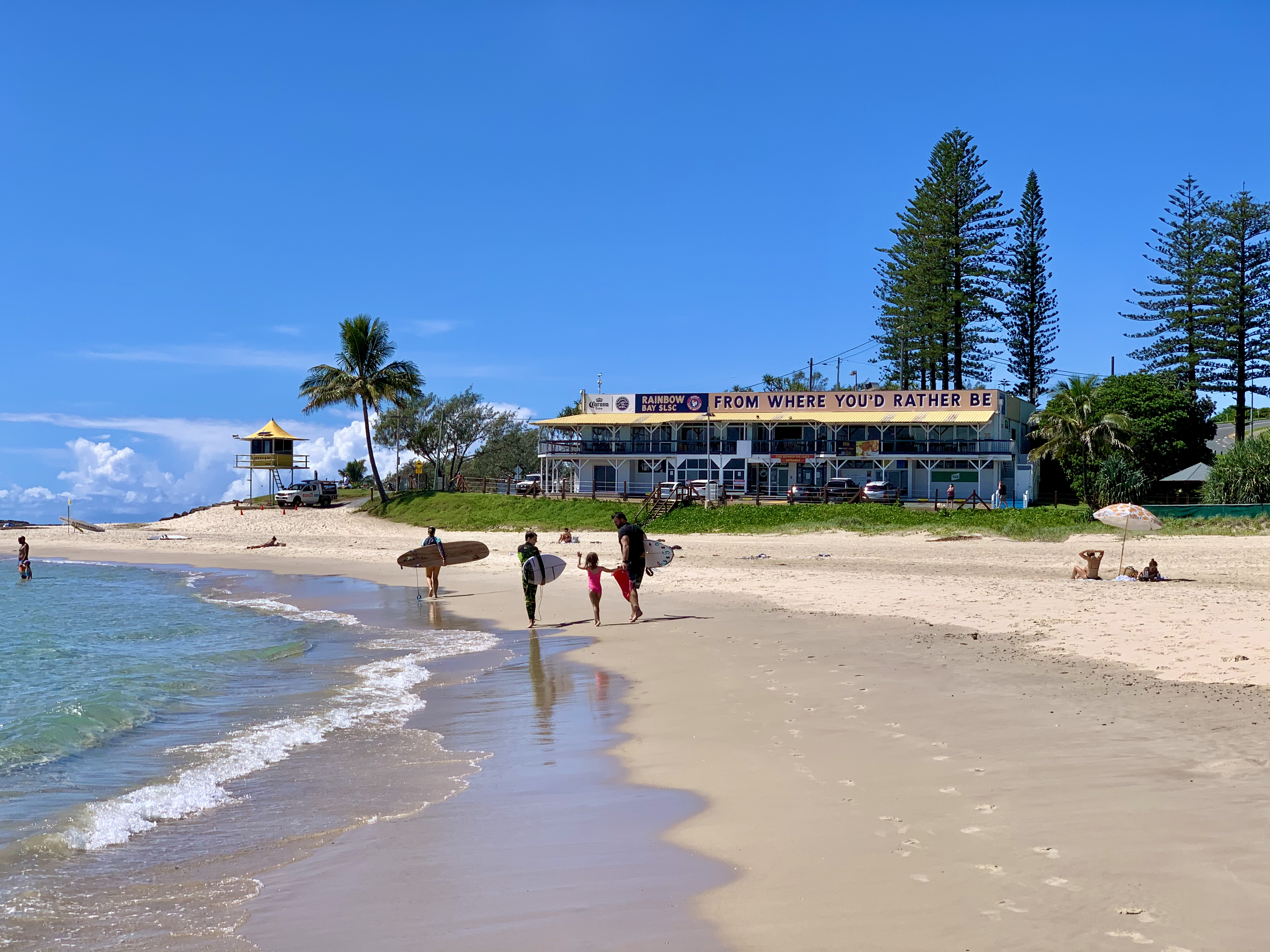

The 2016 Oceania Beach Handball Championship was held at Coolangatta Beach, Queensland, Australia between February 24 and 28, 2016. There were two divisions, men's and women's with only Australia and New Zealand entering.

In the men's draw, defending champions Australia were pushed all the way by New Zealand winning in the end two sets to one. In the women's draw, Australia were also the defending champions and won two sets to nill. Both Australian team qualify for the 2016 Beach Handball World Championships in Hungary.

== Results ==
=== Men's division ===
Team 1	Score	Team 2
26 February 2016
Australia	1-2	New Zealand
27 February 2016
Australia	2-1	New Zealand
Australia	2-0	New Zealand

=== Women's division ===
Team 1	Score	Team 2
26 February 2016
Australia	2-0	New Zealand
27 February 2016
Australia	2-0	New Zealand
