= Beach handball at the 2001 World Games – Men's tournament =

Beach handball at the World Games
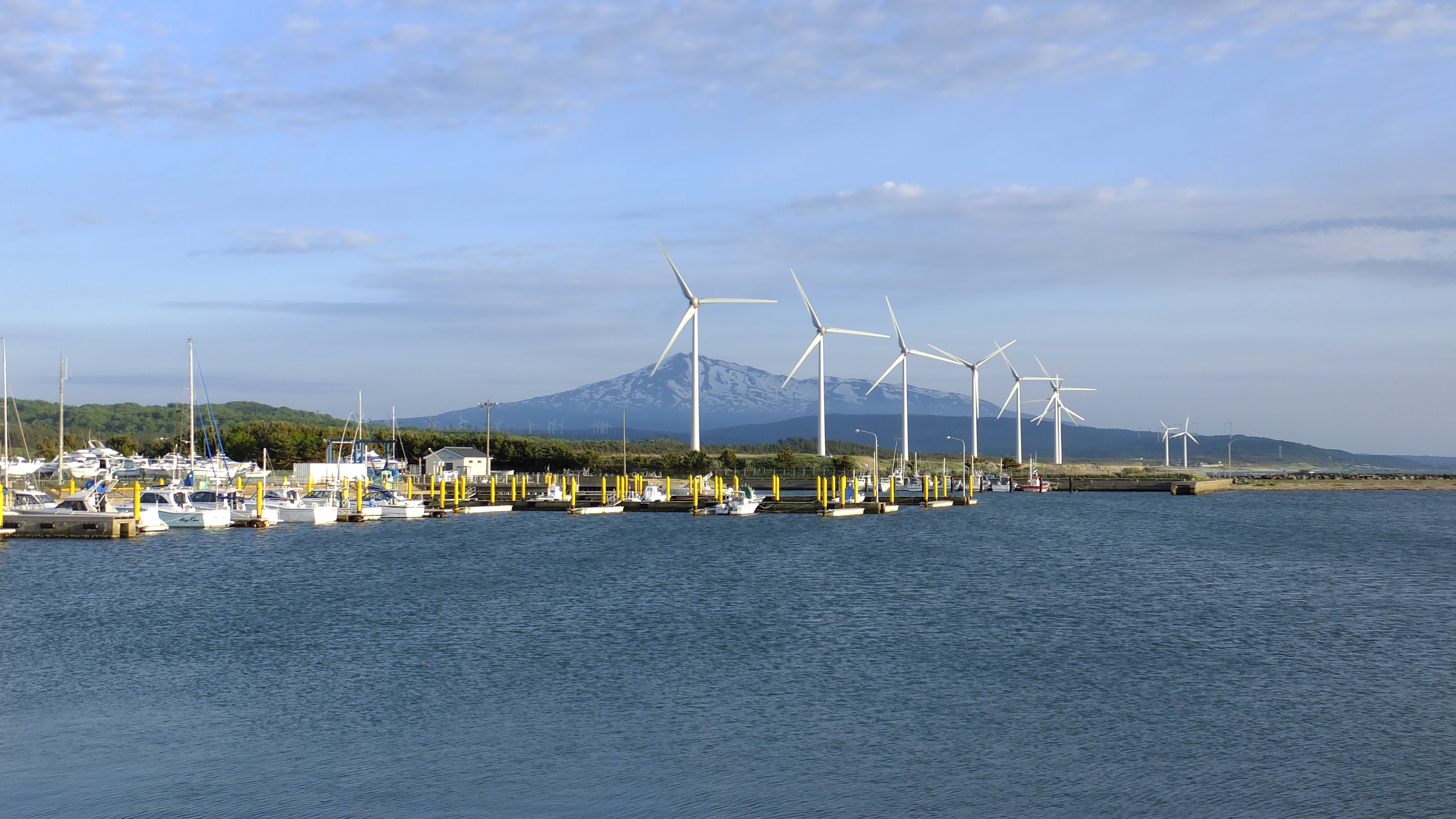
- Honjō Marina
- Venue: Honjō Marina, Honjō, Japan
- Date: 23–25 August 2001
- Competitors: from 6 nations

Medalists
1st place, gold medalist(s)		Belarus
2nd place, silver medalist(s)		Spain
3rd place, bronze medalist(s)		Brazil

Men's tournament in beach handball was one of the invitational events in at the 2001 World Games in Akita. It was played from 23 to 25 August. The competition took place at Honjō Marina in Honjō, Japan.

== Competition format ==
A total of 6 teams entered the competition. In preliminary stage they play round-robin tournament. The best four teams advances to the semifinals.

== Results ==
=== Preliminary stage ===
Rank	Team	M	W	L	PO	Net	BLR	ESP	BRA	IRI	TOG	JPN
1	Belarus	5	5	0	152–103	+26	x	2–0	2–0	2–0	2–0	2–1
2	Spain	5	4	1	168–142	+49	0–2	x	2–0	2–0	2–0	2–0
3	Brazil	5	3	2	123–116	+7	0–2	0–2	x	2–0	2–0	2–1
4	Iran	5	2	3	111–143	–32	0–2	0–2	0–2	x	2–1	2–0
5	Togo	5	1	4	121–166	–45	0–2	0–2	0–2	1–2	x	2–1
6	Japan	5	0	5	116–121	–6	1–2	0–2	1–2	0–2	1–2	x

=== Semifinals ===
25 August 2001	Belarus	2–0	Iran	Honjō Marina, Honjō
25 August 2001		(17–13,13–8)		Honjō Marina, Honjō

25 August 2001	Spain	2–0	Brazil	Honjō Marina, Honjō
25 August 2001		(20–13, 14–11)		Honjō Marina, Honjō

=== Fifth place match ===
25 August 2001	Togo	0–2	Japan	Honjō Marina, Honjō
25 August 2001		(12–13, 9–11)		Honjō Marina, Honjō

=== Bronze medal match ===
25 August 2001	Iran	1–2	Brazil	Honjō Marina, Honjō
25 August 2001		(9–19, 14–9, ?)		Honjō Marina, Honjō

=== Gold medal match ===
25 August 2001	Belarus	2–1	Spain	Honjō Marina, Honjō
25 August 2001		(18–15, 8–14, ?)		Honjō Marina, Honjō

== Final ranking ==
Rank	Team
Gold medal	Belarus
Silver medal	Spain
Bronze medal	Brazil
4	Iran
5	Japan
6	Togo
