= China national beach handball team =

China national beach handball team may refer to

- China men's national beach handball team
- China women's national beach handball team
