= Australia women's national beach handball team =

Australia

Information
- Association: Australian Handball Federation
- Coach: Andrew Kelso

Colours
Home	Away

Results

World Games
- Appearances: 2 (First in 2013)
- Best result: 6th (2017)

World Championship
- Appearances: 6 (First in 2012)
- Best result: 8th (2012, 2016)
- Last updated on Unknown.

The Australia women's national beach handball team, also known as the Aussie Beach Gliders, is the national team of Australia. It is governed by the Australian Handball Federation and takes part in international beach handball competitions.

== Results ==
=== World Championships ===
Year	Position
(Egypt) 2004	Did not participate
(Brazil) 2006	Did not participate
(Spain) 2008	Did not participate
(Turkey) 2010	Did not participate
(Oman) 2012	8th place
(Brazil) 2014	12th place
(Hungary) 2016	8th place
(Russia) 2018	16th place
(Greece) 2022	16th place
(China) 2024	13th place
Total	6/10

=== World Games ===
Year	Position
(Japan) 2001	Did not qualify
(Germany) 2005	Did not qualify
(Taiwan) 2009	Did not qualify
(Colombia) 2013	7th place
(Poland) 2017	6th place
(United States) 2022	6th place
Total	3/6

=== Oceania Championship ===
Year	Position
(Australia) 2013	1st
(Australia) 2016	1st
(Australia) 2018	1st
(Australia) 2019	1st
(Australia) 2022	1st
Total	5/5

== Team ==
- Head Coach: Andrew Kelso
- Team Manager: Bernadette Coase

Selected Team for the World Championships 2018:

Birte Biehler, Daniela Borelli Dos Santos, Aminta Thomas, Heather Cooper, Ana Medjed, Madeleine McAfee, Rosalie Boyd, Vanja Smiljanic, Aline Viana, Manon Vernay

Captain: Aminta Thomas / Vice Captain: Daniela Borelli Dos Santos
