= 2022 Asian Beach Handball Championship =

8th Asian Men's & Women's Beach Handball Championship 2022
Tournament details
- Host country: Iran
- Venue(s): 1 (in 1 host city)
- Dates: 22–28 March 2022
- Teams: 6 (from 1 confederation)

Final positions
- Champions: Iran
- Runner-up: Qatar
- Third place: Vietnam
- Fourth place: Oman

The 2022 Asian Beach Handball Championship was the 8th edition of the championship held from 22 to 28 March 2022 at Tehran, Iran under the aegis of Asian Handball Federation (AHF). It was the second time in history that the championship was organised by IR Iran Handball Federation. It also acted as a qualification tournament for the 2022 Beach Handball World Championships, with the top two teams in each gender from the championship directly qualifying for the event to be hosted by Greece.

== Venue ==
The event took place at the Iran Sports Complex in Tehran.

== Results Men's ==
Tuesday, April 2:

- Vietnam-Oman
- Philippines-Qatar
- India 0-2 Iran

Wednesday, April 3:

- Qatar-Oman
- India-Vietnam
- Iran 2-0 Philippines

Friday, April 5:

- Qatar-India
- Philippines-Oman
- Vietnam 1- 2 Iran

Saturday, April 6:

- India-Philippines
- Vietnam-Qatar
- Iran 1-2 Oman

Monday, April 8:

- India-Oman
- Philippines-Vietnam
- Qatar 1-2 Iran
