= New Zealand women's national beach handball team =

New Zealand

Information
- Association: New Zealand Handball Federation

Colours
Home	Away

Results

World Championship
- Appearances: 1 (First in 2010)
- Best result: 12th (2010)
- Last updated on Unknown.

The New Zealand women's national beach handball team is the national team of New Zealand. It takes part in international beach handball competitions.

== World Championships results ==
- 2010 – 12th place
