= 2017 Asian Beach Handball Championship =

6th Asian Beach Handball Championship 2017
Tournament details
- Host country: Thailand
- Venue(s): 1 (in 1 host city)
- Dates: 8 – 15 May 2017
- Teams: 10 (from 1 confederation)

Final positions
- Champions: Qatar (men); Thailand (women)
- Runner-up: Oman (men); Vietnam (women)
- Third place: Iran (men); Chinese Taipei (women)
- Fourth place: Vietnam (men); China (women)

The 2017 Asian Beach Handball Championship was the 6th edition of the Asian Beach Handball Championship held from 8 to 15 May 2017 at Pattaya, Thailand under the aegis of Asian Handball Federation. It also acts as the qualification tournament for the 2018 Beach Handball World Championships.

== Format ==
In men's category the tournament was played on the round-robin-cum-knockout format. A team had to play match with all the other teams in group stage. Top two teams from each group will advance to semifinals. In women's category the tournament was played in a round-robin format and final standings in the group are final positions.

Matches were played in sets, the team that wins two sets is the winner of a match. When teams were equal in points the head-to-head result was decisive.

== Men ==
=== Participating nations ===
- Afghanistan
- Chinese Taipei
- Iran
- Oman
- Qatar (Defending Champion)
- Thailand (Host)
- United Arab Emirates
- Uzbekistan
- Vietnam

=== Group A ===
Team	Pld	W	L	SW	SL	Diff	Pts	Qualification
Qatar	3	3	0	6	0	+6	6	Semifinal
Oman	3	2	1	4	2	+2	4	Semifinal
Chinese Taipei	3	1	2	2	4	-2	2	5th–8th Place
Uzbekistan	3	0	3	0	6	-6	0	5th–8th Place

Team 1	Score	Team 2
8 May 2017
19:00
Chinese Taipei	0 - 2	Oman
9 May 2017
17:45
Uzbekistan	0 - 2	Qatar
10 May 2017
17:00
Uzbekistan	0 - 2	Oman
18:30
Chinese Taipei	0 - 2	Qatar
11 May 2017
17:45
Chinese Taipei	2 - 0	Uzbekistan
12 May 2017
17:00
Qatar	2 - 0	Oman

=== Group B ===
Team	Pld	W	L	SW	SL	Diff	Pts	Qualification
Vietnam	4	4	0	8	2	+6	8	Semifinal
Iran	4	3	1	7	2	+5	6	Semifinal
Thailand	4	2	2	5	5	0	4	5th–8th Place
United Arab Emirates	4	1	3	3	6	-3	2	5th–8th Place
Afghanistan	4	0	4	0	8	-8	0	9th Place

Team 1	Score	Team 2
8 May 2017
17:00
Afghanistan	0 - 2	Iran
18:15
United Arab Emirates	1 - 2	Thailand
9 May 2017
17:00
Vietnam	2 - 1	Iran
18:30
Afghanistan	0 - 2	Thailand
10 May 2017
16:15
Iran	2 - 0	United Arab Emirates
17:45
Afghanistan	0 - 2	Vietnam
11 May 2017
17:00
United Arab Emirates	2 - 0	Afghanistan
18:30
Vietnam	2 - 1	Thailand
12 May 2017
16:15
United Arab Emirates	0 - 2	Vietnam
18:30
Thailand	0 - 2	Iran

=== 5th–8th-place matches ===
5th–8th-place semifinals
14 May - 10:00hrs
Chinese Taipei	2
United Arab Emirates	0
14 May - 10:45hrs
Thailand	2
Uzbekistan	0

5th-place match
14 May - 17:00hrs
Chinese Taipei	2
Thailand	1
7th-place match
14 May - 16:15hrs
United Arab Emirates	2
Uzbekistan	0

=== Final matches ===
Semifinal match
14 May - 18:30hrs
Vietnam	0
Qatar	2
14 May - 19:15hrs
Oman	2
Iran	1

Final match
15 May - 17:15hrs
Qatar	2
Oman	0
Third-place match
15 May - 15:45hrs
Vietnam	1
Iran	2

=== Final standings ===
Gold medal	Qatar (4th Title) (Defending Champion)
Silver medal	Oman
Bronze medal	Iran
4	Vietnam
5	Chinese Taipei
6	Thailand (Host)
7	United Arab Emirates
8	Uzbekistan
9	Afghanistan

Qualified for the 2018 Beach Handball World Championships

== Women ==
=== Participating nations ===
- China
- Chinese Taipei
- Thailand (Defending Champion) (Host)
- Vietnam

=== Round-Robin ===
Team	Pld	W	L	SW	SL	Diff	Pts
Thailand	3	3	0	6	1	+5	6
Vietnam	3	2	1	4	2	+2	4
Chinese Taipei	3	1	2	2	4	-2	2
China	3	0	3	1	6	-5	0

Team 1	Score	Team 2
12 May 2017
15:30
Vietnam	2 - 0	Chinese Taipei
17:45
China	1 - 2	Thailand
14 May 2017
15:30
China	0 - 2	Chinese Taipei
17:45
Vietnam	0 - 2	Thailand
15 May 2017
17:00
Vietnam	2 - 0	China
18:30
Thailand	2 - 0	Chinese Taipei

=== Final standings ===
Gold medal	Thailand (3rd Title) (Defending Champion) (Host)
Silver medal	Vietnam
Bronze medal	Chinese Taipei
4	China

Qualified for the 2018 Beach Handball World Championships
