= Russia men's national beach handball team =

Russia

Information
- Association: Handball Union of Russia
- Coach: Vladimir Poleatev

Colours
Home	Away

Results

World Championship
- Appearances: 7 (First in 2004)
- Best result: 3rd (2004)
- Last updated on Unknown.

Russia men's national beach handball team
Medal record

World Championship
Bronze medal – third place	2004 Egypt	

The Russia men's national beach handball team is the national team of Russia. It is governed by the Handball Union of Russia and took part in international beach handball competitions.

In reaction to the 2022 Russian invasion of Ukraine, the International Handball Federation banned Russian and Belarus athletes and officials, and the European Handball Federation suspended the national team of Russia as well as Russian clubs competing in European handball competitions. Referees, officials, and commission members from Russia will not be called upon for future activities. And new organisers will be sought for the YAC 16 EHF Beach Handball EURO and the Qualifier Tournaments for the Beach Handball EURO 2023, which were to be held in Moscow. In addition, it refused to allow competitions to be held in Russia. The Russian Handball Federation failed in its appeal against the decision to exclude Russia's teams from continental competition, which was rejected by the European Handball Federation Court of Handball.

== Results ==
=== World Championships ===
- 2004 – 3rd place
- 2006 – 9th place
- 2008 – 8th place
- 2010 – 6th place
- 2012 – 4th place
- 2014 – 7th place
- 2018 – 6th place
- 2022 – Disqualified

=== World Games ===
Year	Position
(Japan) 2001*	Did not qualify
(Germany) 2005*	1st
(Taiwan) 2009*	Did not qualify
(Colombia) 2013	2nd
Total	3/4

* invitational sport
