= Iran men's national beach handball team =

Iranian sports team

Iran

Information
- Association: Iran Handball Federation
- Coach: Mehdi Ghashghaeirad
- Assistant coach: Sayed Eftekhari; Gholamhossein Nikouei

Colours
Home	Away

Results

World Championship
- Appearances: 4 (First in 2008)
- Best result: Quarterfinals (2018)
- Last updated on Unknown.

The Iran men's national beach handball team is the national team of Iran. It takes part in international beach handball competitions.

== Results ==
=== World Championship ===
Year	Rank	M	W	L
(Egypt) 2004	Did not qualify			
(Brazil) 2006	Did not qualify			
(Spain) 2008	11th place	7	2	5
(Turkey) 2010	Did not qualify			
(Oman) 2012	Did not qualify			
(Brazil) 2014	Did not qualify			
(Hungary) 2016	Did not qualify			
(Russia) 2018	8th place	9	2	7
(Greece) 2022	9th place	9	5	4
(China) 2024	Did not qualify			
(Croatia) 2026	9th place	9	5	4
Total	4/11	34	14	20

=== Asian Championship ===
Year	Rank	M	W	L	SW	SL	PW	PL	PD	Ref
(Oman) 2004	4th Place	0	0	0	0	0	0	0	0	
(Iran) 2007	2nd place	0	0	0	0	0	0	0	0	
(Oman) 2011	5th Place	0	0	0	0	0	0	0	0	
(Hong Kong) 2013	Did not Enter									
(Oman) 2015	5th Place	5	2	3	4	7	140	158	-18	
(Thailand) 2017	3rd Place	6	4	2	10	5	196	154	+42	
(China) 2019	3rd Place	7	5	2	11	7	257	223	+34	
(Iran) 2022	1st place	5	4	1	9	4	190	141	+49	
(Indonesia) 2023	3rd place	6	4	2	8	5	241	190	+51	
(Oman) 2025	2nd place	7	6	1	12	3	273	178	+95	
Total	9/10	36	25	11	54	31	1297	1044	+252	-

=== Asian Youth Championship ===
Year	Rank	M	W	L	SW	SL	PW	PL	PD	Ref
(Thailand) 2016	4th Place	0	0	0	0	0	0	0	0	
(Iran) 2022	1st place	5	5	0	10	0	222	95	+127	
(Thailand) 2024	1st place	6	6	0	12	3	272	194	+78	
Total	3/3	11	11	0	22	3	494	289	+205	-

=== World Youth Championship ===
Year	Rank	M	W	L	SW	SL	PW	PL	PD	Ref
(Mauritius) 2017	-	0	0	0	0	0	0	0	0	
(Greece) 2022	3rd place	9	6	3	0	0	0	0	0	
2025	-	0	0	0	0	0	0	0	0	
Total	2/3	0	0	0	0	0	0	0	0	-

=== World Games ===
- 2001 – 4th place
