= Australia men's national beach handball team =

Australia

Information
- Association: Australian Handball Federation
- Coach: Lucas Turecek

Colours
| Home | Away |

Results

World Games
- Appearances: 2 (First in 2013)
- Best result: 6th (2017)

World Championship
- Appearances: 7 (First in 2010)
- Best result: 11th (2014)
- Last updated on Unknown.

The Australia national beach handball team are the national team of Australia. It is governed by the Australian Handball Federation and takes part in international beach handball competitions.

The Australian teams of both Women and Men were present to all world championships and world games since 2010. Both teams are currently preparing for the 2016 world championships in Budapest (Hungary) during July 2016.

The qualifier Oceania took place in Gold Coast at the end of February 2016. Both the Women and Men team have won the Oceania Qualifiers and won a spot in the 2016 World Cup.

== Results ==
=== World Championships ===
| Year | Result |
|---|---|
| (Egypt) 2004 | Did not participate |
| (Brazil) 2006 | Did not participate |
| (Spain) 2008 | Did not participate |
| (Turkey) 2010 | 12th place |
| (Oman) 2012 | 12th place |
| (Brazil) 2014 | 11th place |
| (Hungary) 2016 | 12th place |
| (Russia) 2018 | 13th place |
| (Greece) 2022 | Did not qualify |
| (China) 2024 | 14th place |
| (Croatia) 2026 | 15th place |
| Total | 7/11 |

=== World Games ===
| Year | Result |
|---|---|
| (Japan) 2001 | Did not qualify |
| (Germany) 2005 | Did not qualify |
| (Taiwan) 2009 | Did not qualify |
| (Colombia) 2013 | 8th place |
| (Poland) 2017 | 6th place |
| (United States) 2022 | Did not qualify |
| Total | 2/6 |

=== Oceania Championship ===
| Year | Result |
|---|---|
| (Australia) 2013 | 1st place |
| (Australia) 2016 | 1st place |
| (Australia) 2018 | 1st place |
| (Australia) 2019 | 1st place |
| (Australia) 2022 | 2nd place |
| (Australia) 2023 | 1st place |
| (New Zealand) 2026 | 1st place |
| Total | 7/7 |
