= 2010 Beach Handball World Championships =

International beach handball competition

The 2010 Beach Handball World Championships was a twelve-team tournament in both men's and women's beach handball, held at Antalya in Turkey from 23 June 2010 to 27 June 2010. It was the fourth edition of the event. Matches were played in sets, the team that wins two sets was the winner of a match. When teams are equal in points the head-to-head result was decisive.

== Format ==
The twelve teams were split into two groups of six teams. After playing a round-robin, the three top-ranked teams advanced to the main round. Every team kept the points from preliminary round matches against teams who also advanced. In the main round every team had three games against the opponents they did not face in the preliminary round. The top four teams advanced to the semifinals. The three bottom-ranked teams from each preliminary round group were packed into one group. The points won against the teams who were also in this group would be valid. Every team had three games and after those rounds there were placement matches from 7th to 12th.

== Men ==
=== Participating nations ===
Group A	Group B
Brazil; Hungary; Libya; Oman; Spain; Turkey	Australia; Croatia; Denmark; Egypt; Qatar; Russia

=== Preliminary round ===
Team advanced to Main Round
Team competes in consolation round

==== Group A ====
Team	Pts	Pld	W	L	SW	SL
Brazil	10	5	5	0	10	0
Hungary	6	5	3	2	7	5
Turkey	6	5	3	2	7	5
Spain	6	5	3	2	6	5
Oman	2	5	1	4	3	8
Libya	0	5	0	5	1	10

June 23, 2010

Brazil	2–0	Libya
Spain	2–1	Hungary
Turkey	2–1	Oman
Libya	0–2	Spain
Oman	0–2	Brazil
Hungary	2–1	Turkey

June 24, 2010

Brazil	2–0	Spain
Oman	0–2	Hungary
Turkey	2–1	Libya
Libya	0–2	Oman
Brazil	2–0	Hungary
Spain	0–2	Turkey

June 25, 2010

Hungary	2–0	Libya
Spain	2–0	Oman
Turkey	0–2	Brazil

==== Group B ====
Team	Pts	Pld	W	L	SW	SL
Egypt	8	5	4	1	8	3
Russia	8	5	4	1	8	5
Denmark	6	5	3	2	8	5
Croatia	6	5	3	2	9	3
Qatar	2	5	1	4	3	8
Australia	0	5	0	5	0	10

June 23, 2010

Egypt	2–0	Russia
Croatia	2–0	Australia
Denmark	2–0	Qatar
Australia	0–2	Egypt
Qatar	0–2	Croatia
Russia	2–1	Denmark

June 24, 2010

Qatar	1–2	Russia
Denmark	2–0	Australia
Croatia	2–0	Egypt
Australia	0–2	Qatar
Egypt	2–1	Denmark
Croatia	1–2	Russia

June 25, 2010

Russia	2–0	Australia
Egypt	2–0	Qatar
Denmark	2–1	Croatia

=== Main round (Group C) ===
Team advances to Semifinals

Team	Pts	Pld	W	L	SW	SL
Brazil	8	5	4	1	9	2
Hungary	8	5	4	1	8	5
Turkey	6	5	3	2	7	5
Egypt	4	5	2	3	5	7
Russia	4	5	2	3	5	8
Denmark	0	5	0	5	3	10

June 25, 2010

Brazil	2–0	Denmark
Turkey	2–0	Russia
Hungary	2–1	Egypt

June 26, 2010

Brazil	1–2	Russia
Turkey	2–0	Egypt
Hungary	2–0	Denmark
Turkey	2–1	Denmark
Brazil	2–0	Egypt
Hungary	2–1	Russia

=== Consolation round (Group D) ===
Team	Pts	Pld	W	L	SW	SL
Croatia	10	5	5	0	10	0
Spain	8	5	4	1	8	2
Qatar	6	5	3	2	6	4
Oman	4	5	2	3	4	6
Libya	2	5	1	4	2	8
Australia	0	5	0	5	0	10

June 25, 2010

Spain	2–0	Australia
Oman	0–2	Qatar
Libya	0–2	Croatia

June 26, 2010

Spain	2–0	Qatar
Oman	0–2	Croatia
Libya	2–0	Australia
Spain	0–2	Croatia
Libya	0–2	Qatar
Oman	2–0	Australia

=== Placement matches ===
11th/12th position
June 27, 2010

Libya	2–0	Australia

9th/10th position
June 27, 2010

Qatar	0–2	Oman

7th/8th position
June 27, 2010

Croatia	2–1	Spain

5th/6th position
June 27, 2010

Russia	0–2	Denmark

=== Finals ===
Semi Final
June 27, 2010
Brazil	2
Egypt	0
June 27, 2010
Hungary	2
Turkey	1

Final
June 27, 2010
Brazil	2
Hungary	0
3rd/4th place
June 27, 2010
Egypt	1
Turkey	2

==== Semifinals ====
June 27, 2010

Brazil	2–0	Egypt
Hungary	2–1	Turkey

==== 3rd/4th place ====
June 27, 2010

Egypt	1–2	Turkey

==== Final ====
June 27, 2010

Brazil	2–0	Hungary

== Women ==
=== Participating nations ===
Group A	Group B
Croatia; Denmark; Italy; Japan; New Zealand; Ukraine	Brazil; China; Hungary; Norway; Spain; Turkey

=== Preliminary round ===
Team advanced to Main Round
Team competes in consolation round

==== Group A ====
Team	Pts	Pld	W	L	SW	SL
Ukraine	8	5	4	1	9	3
Croatia	6	5	3	2	7	4
Denmark	6	5	3	2	7	5
Italy	6	5	3	2	7	5
Japan	4	5	2	3	4	7
New Zealand	0	5	0	5	0	10

June 23, 2010

Denmark	1–2	Japan
Italy	2–1	Ukraine
Croatia	2–0	New Zealand
Ukraine	2–0	Denmark
Japan	0–2	Croatia
New Zealand	0–2	Italy

June 24, 2010

Croatia	2–0	Italy
Japan	0–2	Ukraine
Denmark	2–0	New Zealand
New Zealand	0–2	Japan
Croatia	1–2	Ukraine
Italy	1–2	Denmark

June 25, 2010

Denmark	2–0	Croatia
Ukraine	2–0	New Zealand
Italy	2–0	Japan

==== Group B ====
Team	Pts	Pld	W	L	SW	SL
Norway	8	5	4	1	9	2
Brazil	8	5	4	1	9	4
Turkey	6	5	2	3	5	6
Hungary	4	5	2	3	5	8
Spain	2	5	1	4	3	8
China	2	5	1	4	2	9

June 23, 2010

Spain	1–2	Hungary
Turkey	2–0	China
Brazil	2–1	Norway
China	0–2	Spain
Norway	2–0	Turkey
Hungary	2–1	Brazil

June 24, 2010

China	0–2	Norway
Spain	0–2	Brazil
Turkey	2–0	Hungary
Spain	0–2	Norway
Hungary	1–2	China
Brazil	2–1	Turkey

June 25, 2010

Turkey	2–0	Spain
Norway	2–0	Hungary
Brazil	2–0	China

=== Main Round (Group C) ===
Team advances to Semifinals

Team	Pts	Pld	W	L	SW	SL
Brazil	10	5	5	0	10	2
Norway	6	5	3	2	8	5
Ukraine	4	5	2	3	4	7
Denmark	4	5	2	3	5	7
Croatia	4	5	2	3	5	6
Turkey	2	5	1	4	4	8

June 25, 2010

Ukraine	0–2	Turkey
Denmark	1–2	Norway
Croatia	0–2	Brazil

June 26, 2010

Ukraine	0–2	Norway
Croatia	2–0	Turkey
Denmark	0–2	Brazil
Denmark	2–1	Turkey
Ukraine	0–2	Brazil
Croatia	2–1	Norway

=== Consolation round (Group D) ===
Team	Pts	Pld	W	L	SW	SL
Italy	10	5	5	0	10	2
Hungary	6	5	3	2	8	5
Japan	6	5	3	2	6	5
Spain	4	5	2	3	7	6
China	4	5	2	3	4	7
New Zealand	0	5	0	5	0	10

June 25, 2010

Italy	2–0	China
Japan	2–1	Spain
New Zealand	0–2	Hungary

June 26, 2010

Italy	2–1	Spain
Japan	0–2	Hungary
New Zealand	0–2	China
Italy	2–1	Hungary
New Zealand	0–2	Spain
Japan	2–0	China

=== Placement matches ===
11th/12th position
June 27, 2010

China	2–0	New Zealand

9th/10th position
June 27, 2010

Japan	0–2	Spain

7th/8th position
June 27, 2010

Italy	1–2	Hungary

5th/6th position
June 27, 2010

Croatia	0–2	Turkey

=== Finals ===
Semi Final
June 27, 2010
Brazil	1
Denmark	2
June 27, 2010
Norway	2
Ukraine	1

Final
June 27, 2010
Denmark	0
Norway	2
3rd/4th place
June 27, 2010
Brazil	2
Ukraine	0

==== Semifinals ====
June 27, 2010

Brazil	1–2	Denmark
Norway	2–1	Ukraine

==== 3rd/4th place ====
June 27, 2010

Brazil	2–0	Ukraine

==== Final ====
June 27, 2010

Denmark	0–2	Norway
