= Algeria at the 2019 African Beach Games =

- Flag of Algeria
- IOC code: ALG

in Sal, Cape Verde 14 June 2019 – 23 June 2019
- Medals Ranked 2nd: Gold 5 Silver 6 Bronze 5 Total 16

African Beach Games appearances
- 2019; 2023

Algeria competed at the inaugural African Beach Games in Sal, Cape Verde from 14 to 23 June 2019. In total athletes representing Algeria won five gold medals, six silver medals and five bronze medals. The country finished in 2nd place in the medal table.

== Medal summary ==
Medals by sport
| Sport | 1st place, gold medalist(s) | 2nd place, silver medalist(s) | 3rd place, bronze medalist(s) | Total |
|---|---|---|---|---|
| 3×3 basketball | 0 | 1 | 0 | 1 |
| Athletics | 1 | 0 | 0 | 1 |
| Beach handball | 0 | 0 | 1 | 1 |
| Beach soccer | 0 | 1 | 0 | 1 |
| Coastal rowing | 2 | 1 | 0 | 3 |
| Football freestyle | 0 | 1 | 1 | 2 |
| Katate | 1 | 2 | 1 | 4 |
| Kitesurfing | 0 | 0 | 1 | 1 |
| Open water swimming | 1 | 0 | 1 | 2 |

=== Medalists ===
| Medal | Name | Sport | Event |
|---|---|---|---|
| Gold | Riham Senani | Athletics | Women's half marathon |
| Gold | Oussama Habiche | Coastal rowing | Men's singles |
| Gold | Oussama Habiche; Amina Rouba | Coastal rowing | Mixed team |
| Gold | Samir Lakrout; Mouad Ouites; Haoua Abdelhakim | Karate | Men's team kata |
| Gold | Sara Moualfi | Open water swimming | Women's 5 km |
| Silver | Touhami Ghezzoul; Mounir Bernaoui; Nadyr Labouize; Kamel Ammour | 3×3 basketball | Men's team |
| Silver | Amina Haleyi; Rayane Doumi; Samar Benhamouda; Kamilia Boutiara; Rania Boudellal; Romaissa Boudiaf; Meriem Haleyi; Wafa Bencheikh; Khadidja Nefissa; Sarah Derbal | Beach soccer | Women's team |
| Silver | Amina Rouba | Coastal rowing | Women's singles |
| Silver | Mouad Ouites | Karate | Men's individual kata |
| Silver | Manal Kamilia Hadj Saïd; Sara Hanouti; Rayane Salakedji | Karate | Women's team kata |
| Silver | Noureddine Saïdi | Football freestyle | Men's individual routines |
| Bronze | Sihem Hemissi; Lina Slimani; Fatiha Haimer; Tina Salhi; Sylia Zouaoui; Feriel Belouchrani; Yamina Bensalem; Sarah Ait Habib; Kenza Makhloufi | Beach handball | Women's team |
| Bronze | Noureddine Saïdi | Football freestyle | Men's individual battles |
| Bronze | Manal Kamilia Hadj Saïd | Karate | Women's individual kata |
| Bronze | Ahmed Boudjatit | Kitesurfing | Men's boardercross |
| Bronze | Ali Merouane Betka | Open water swimming | Men's 5 km |
