= Tunisia men's national beach handball team =

Tunisia

Information
- Nickname: نسور قرطاج (Eagles of Carthage)
- Association: Tunisian Handball Federation
- Coach: Mohamed Tabboubi
- Assistant coach: Aimen Touzi

Colours
Home	Away

Results

World Games
- Appearances: 1 (First in 2019)
- Best result: 9th (2019)

World Championship
- Appearances: 2 (First in 2024)
- Best result: 11th (2024)

African Beach Games
- Appearances: 2 (First in 2019)
- Best result: Champions (2019, 2023)

African Beach Handball Championship
- Appearances: 1 (First in 2026)
- Best result: Champions (2026)
- Last updated on Unknown.

Tunisia men's national beach handball team
Medal record

Representing Tunisia

Men's Beach handball

African Beach Handball Championship
Gold medal – first place	Togo 2026	

African Beach Games
Gold medal – first place	Cape Verde 2019	
Gold medal – first place	Tunisia 2023	

Mediterranean Beach Games
Gold medal – first place	Italy 2015	

IHF Beach Handball Global Tour
Gold medal – first place	Tunisia 2023	

The Tunisia national beach handball team (Arabic: منتخب تونس لكرة اليد الشاطئية), nicknamed Les Aigles de Carthage (The Eagles of Carthage or The Carthage Eagles), is the national handball team of Tunisia. It is governed by the Tunisian Handball Federation and takes part in international beach handball competitions.

== Competitive record ==
Champions Runners-up Third Place Fourth Place

- Red border color indicates tournament was held on home soil.

=== World Championships ===
World Championships record
Year	Position
(Egypt) 2004	Did not qualify
(Brazil) 2006	Did not qualify
(Spain) 2008	Did not qualify
(Turkey) 2010	Did not qualify
(Oman) 2012	Did not qualify
(Brazil) 2014	Did not qualify
(Hungary) 2016	Did not qualify
(Russia) 2018	Did not qualify
(Italy) 2020	Cancelled
(Greece) 2022	Did not qualify
(China) 2024	11th place
(Croatia) 2026	12th place
(Oman) 2028	To be determined
Total	2/11

=== World Beach Games ===
World Beach Games record
Year	Position
(Qatar) 2019	9th place
Total	1/1

=== African Championship ===
African Beach Handball Championship record
Year	Position
(Togo) 2026	Champions
Total	1/1

=== African Beach Games ===
African Beach Games record
Year	Position
(Cape Verde) 2019	Champions
(Tunisia) 2023	Champions
(Equatorial Guinea) 2027	To be determined
Total	3/3

=== Mediterranean Beach Games ===
Mediterranean Beach Games record
Year	Position
(Italy) 2015	Champions
(Greece) 2019	7th place
Total	2/2

=== Beach Handball Global Tour ===
Beach Handball Global Tour record
Year	Position
(Tunisia) 2023	Champions
Total	1/1

== Honours ==
- IHF Beach Handball Global Tour
  - (gold) Champions (1): 2023
- African Beach Handball Championship
  - Champions (2): 2026
- African Beach Games
  - Champions (1): 2019, 2023
- Mediterranean Beach Games
  - Champions (1): 2015

== See also ==
- Tunisia women's national beach handball team
- Tunisia men's national handball team
- Tunisia men's national junior handball team
- Tunisia men's national youth handball team
