= Sports in Ghana =

Ghana's most popular sport is football, followed by boxing, Athletics, Badminton and basketball.

In December 2025 the Sports Fund was established under Act 1159 under the Ghana Sports Fund Bill to boost sports infrastructure and athletes welfare. To kick start operation of the sports fund, several organizations has donated to the fund which include the National Investment Bank. The minister for Sports and Recreation has also pledge to donate his two months salary to the fund. While Honorable Nelson Rockson Dafeamekpor also donatetes his three months salary to the fund.

National Sports Authority which is governmental agency established before Ghana's independence, states that it promotes sports in Ghana. Collaborating with 52 sporting associations and federations. These national sporting federations are the national governing bodies of each sport. Per an Act of Parliament, the NSA provides financial and technical support to the various national teams that compete locally and internationally through their national federation.

== Olympic sport ==
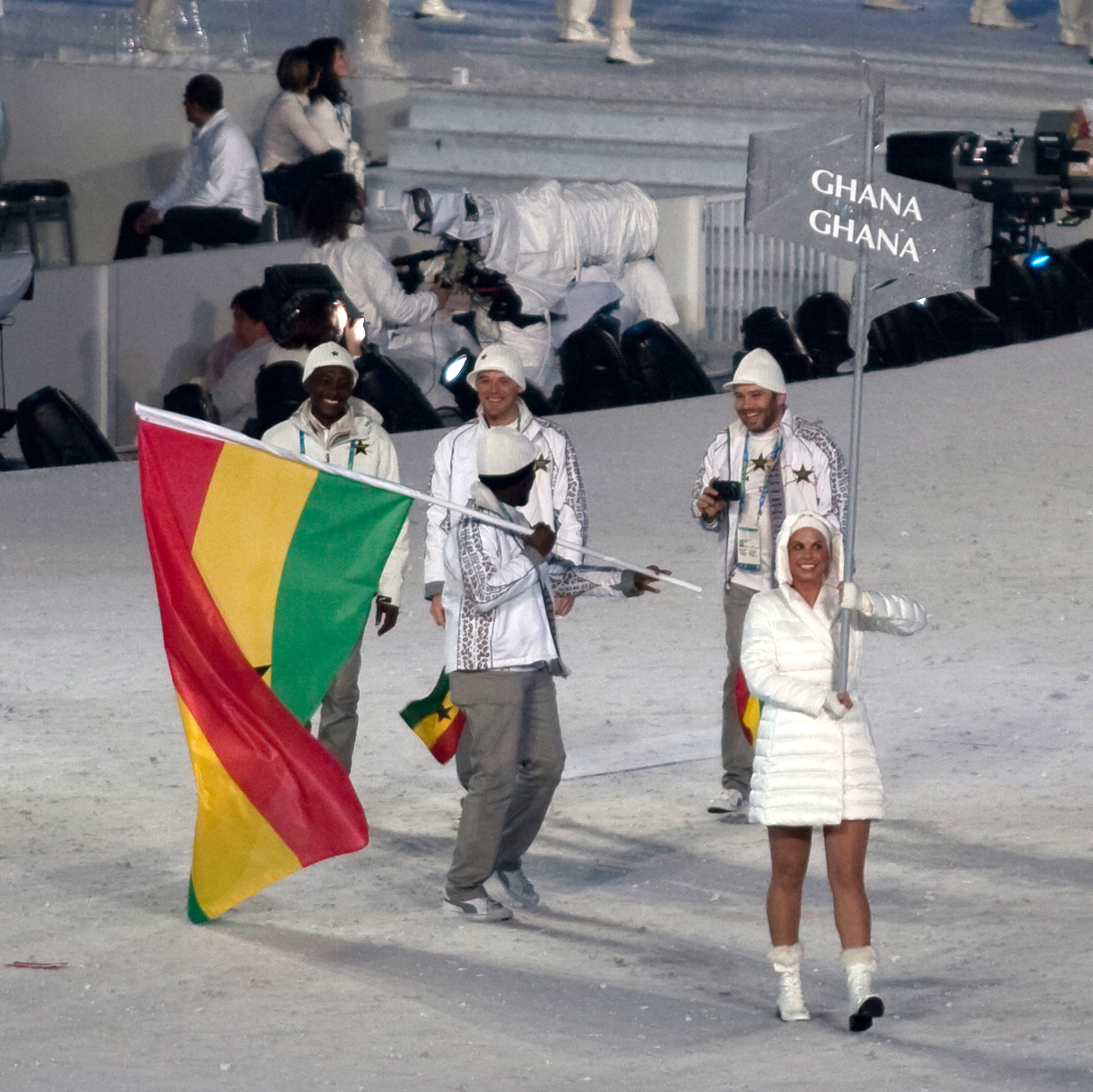
Ghanaian winter sports olympic team at the opening ceremony of the 2010 Winter Olympics.

Olympic sport in Ghana began when Ghana first competed as Gold Coast in the 1952 Summer Olympics.

Ghanaian athletes have won a total of four Olympics medals in thirteen appearances at the Summer Olympics, three in boxing, and a bronze medal in association football, and thus became the first country on the Africa continent to win a medal at association football.

=== 2010 Winter Olympics ===
Ghana competed in the Winter Olympics for the first time in 2010. Ghana qualified for the 2010 Winter Olympics with a score of 137.5 International Ski Federation points, within the qualifying range of 120-140 points. Ghanaian skier, Kwame Nkrumah-Acheampong, nicknamed "The Snow Leopard", became the first Ghanaian to take part in the Winter Olympics, at the 2010 Winter Olympics held in Vancouver, British Columbia, Canada, taking part in the slalom skiing.

Ghana finished 47th out of 102 participating nations, of whom 54 finished in the Alpine skiing slalom. Kwame Nkrumah-Acheampong broke on the international skiing circuit, being the second black African skier to do so.

== Popular sports ==
=== Football ===
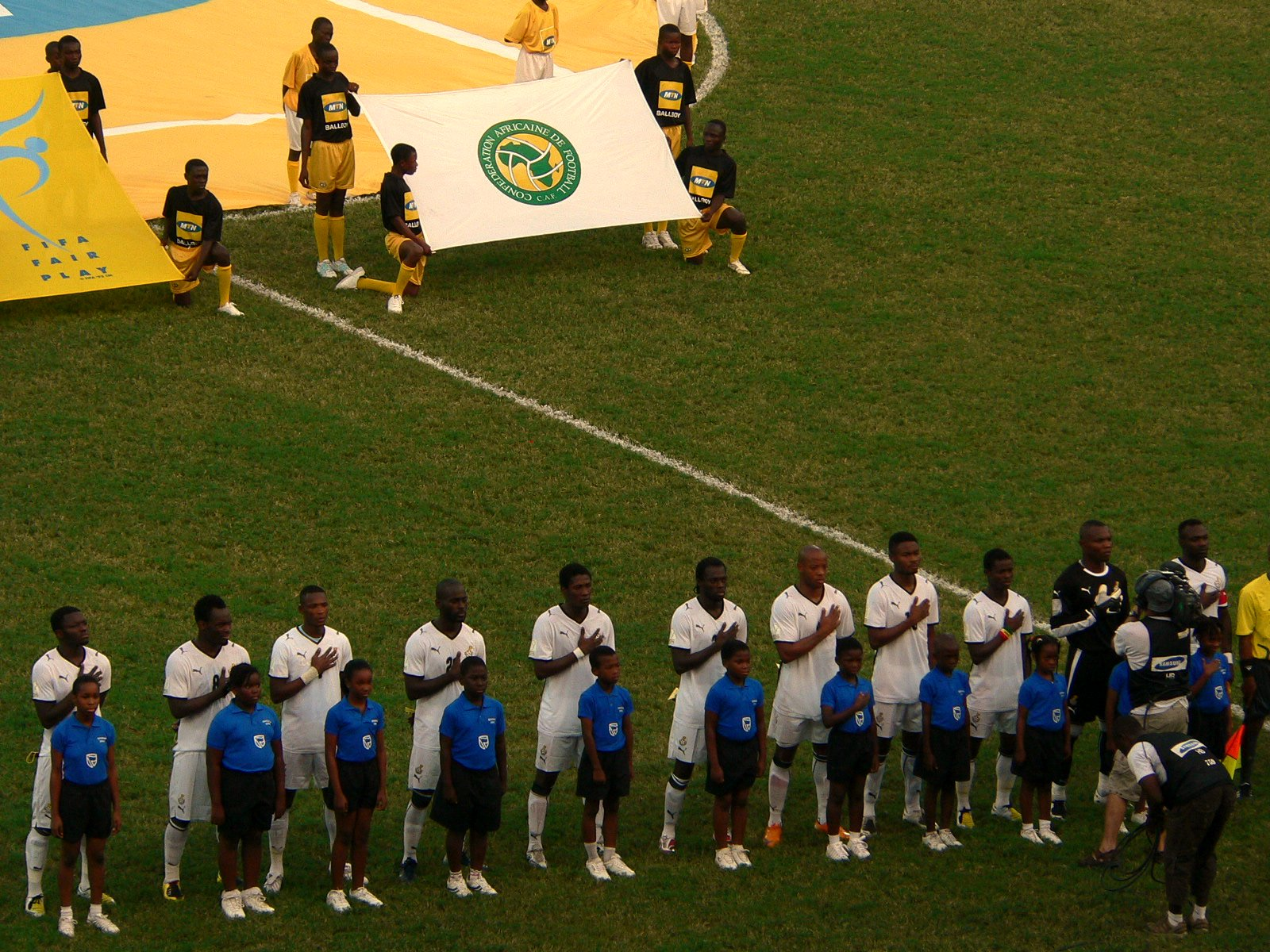
Black Stars squad (Ghanaian national football team) line-up prior to match of the Africa Cup of Nations.

Association football is administered by the Ghana Football Association and the national men's football team is known as the Black Stars, with the under-20 team known as the Black Satellites. Ghana has participated in many championships, including the African Cup of Nations with 4 titles, the FIFA World Cup five times, (2006, 2010, 2014, 2022, and 2026), and the FIFA U-20 World Cup with 1 title. In the 2010 FIFA World Cup, Ghana became the third African country to reach the quarter-final stage of the World Cup after Cameroon in 1990 and Senegal in 2002. Ghana national U-20 football team, known as the Black Satellites, is considered to be the feeder team for the Ghana national football team. Ghana is the first and only country on the Africa continent to be crowned FIFA U-20 World Cup Champions and two-time runner up in 1993 and 2001. The Ghana national U-17 football team, known as the Black Starlets, are two-time FIFA U-17 World Cup champions in 1991 and 1995, two-time runners up in 1993 and 1997.

Ghanaian football teams Asante Kotoko SC and Accra Hearts of Oak SC are the 5th and 9th best teams in Africa and have won a total of five Africa continental association football and Confederation of African Football trophies; Ghanaian football club Asante Kotoko SC has been crowned two-time CAF Champions League winners in 1970, 1983 and five-time CAF Champions League runners up, and Ghanaian football club Accra Hearts of Oak SC has been crowned 2000 CAF Champions League winner and two-time CAF Champions League runners up, 2001 CAF Super Cup champions and 2004 CAF Confederation Cup champions. The International Federation of Football History and Statistics crowned Asante Kotoko SC as the African club of the 20th century. There are several club football teams in Ghana that play in the Ghana Premier League and Division One League, both administered by the Ghana Football Association.

=== Boxing ===
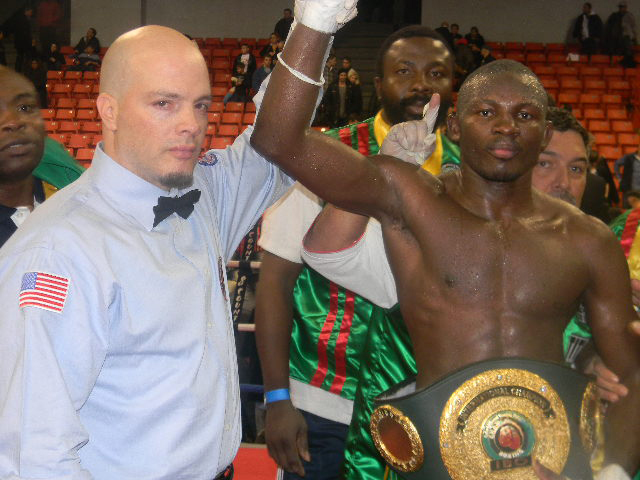
Referee Celestino Ruiz raises the hand of the former IBO International middleweight champion Osumanu Adama at UIC Pavilion.

Boxing is the second most popular sport in Ghana. Bukom, a fishing village is considered as the country's unofficial university of boxing. The country has also produced several world-class boxers, including Azumah Nelson a three-time world champion, Nana Yaw Konadu also a three-time world champion, Ike Quartey, and Joshua Clottey.

=== Athletics ===
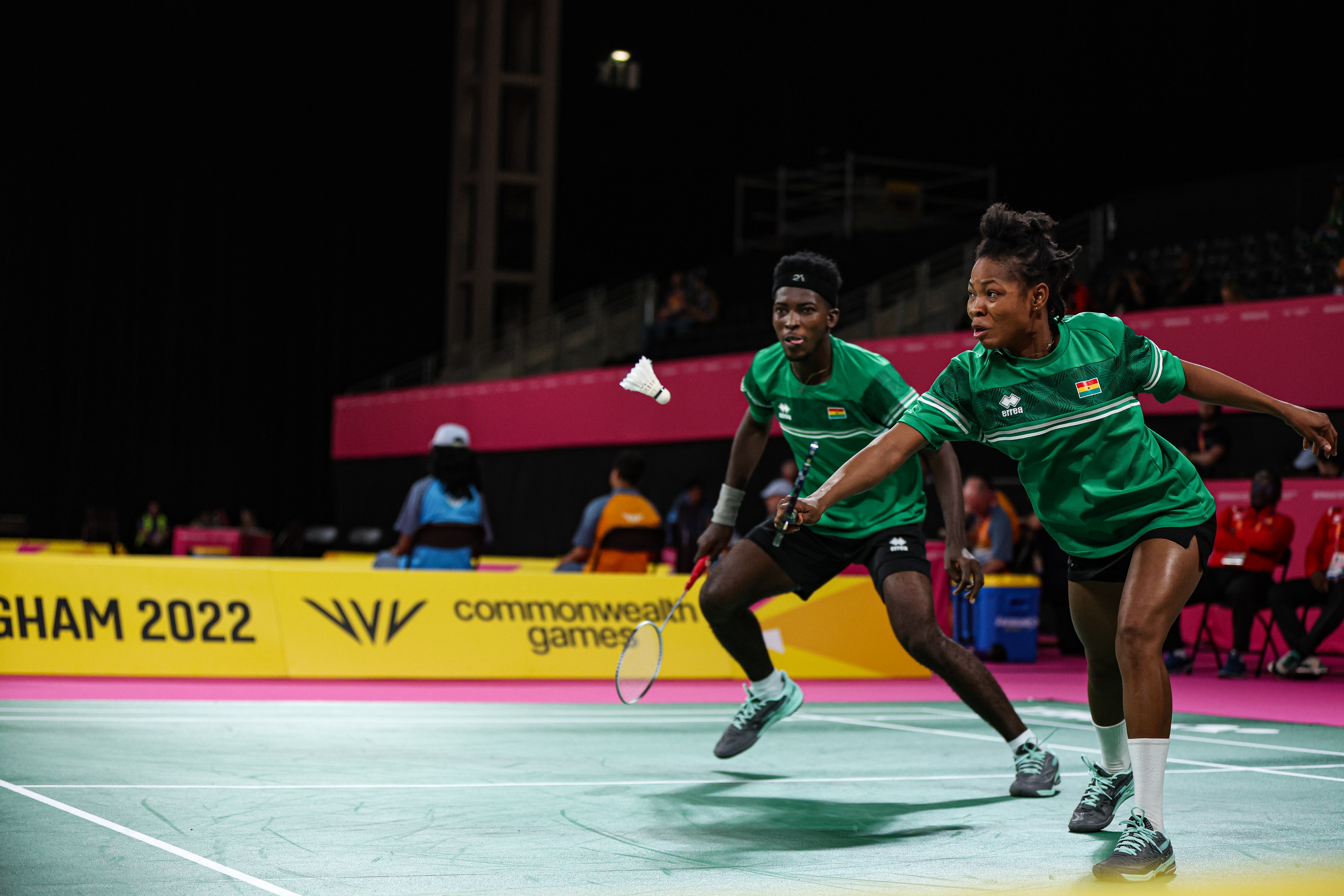
Kelvin Alphous and Prospera Nantuo at the 2022 Commonwealth Games

In the past, Ghanaians showed some talent in athletics, including Joseph Amoah, Vida Anim and others.

=== Badminton ===
Ghana Badminton is known for being the nation's favourite racket sport. Founded in Ghana in 1962, Badminton is the fastest-growing sport in Ghana. In 2017, Ghana Badminton was rekindled by a renewed leadership under a new strategic plan named Mission 2027, spurring growth and opportunities for the sport and getting 4.6 million of the Ghanaian population to start playing Badminton

Its national governing body, Ghana Badminton, represents every member of the Badminton Community in Ghana. The national governing body provides a well-governed, compliant and inclusive sport and represents you at the Government level, ensuring as many players as possible can return to Badminton, represent our clubs and community players to increase the number of available facilities and courts.

In 2018 and 2019, it hosted its International tournament JE Wilson Badminton International in Accra, and has won a host of podium events in multi sport events. Its athletes include, Rabiatu Ofoli, Samuel Lamptey, Kelvin Evans Alphous, Prospera Nantuo, Aaron Tamakloe, Cindy Etornam Tornyenyor, Rachel Quarcoo and Ahmad Samad Abdul.

=== Basketball ===
Basketball is a popular sport in Ghana. Several Ghanaian players play in the top divisions in Europe or the US-based NCAA. Yet, the Ghanaian national basketball team only plays friendly games.

Ghana has competed in several 3x3 basketball tournaments. At the Senior Level, Ghana competed at the FIBA 3x3 Africa Cup in Cotonou, Benin in 2018 in the Men's and Women's categories. The Men's Team also competed in the maiden 2019 African Beach Games. 3x3 basketball has been identified as the most popular urban team sport.

At the club level, the Greater Accra Basketball League (ABL) is the most known league in the country, and features two divisions for both men and women, and has a total of 40 clubs. The Ghana Basketball Federation hosted the first national club championships in December 2022 in Cape Coast. The first men's edition was won by the Greater Accra team, while the women's edition was won by the Ghana Revenue Authority.

=== Cricket ===
Cricket was handed over to Ghana in the early days of then the Gold Cost during the rule of its colonial masters the British and played it's first international game against Nigeria in 1904. After the 2nd World War the game grew from there and spread through expatriates and further local citizens in the mining sector.

The game between the 1960's and 1980's saw the involvement of schools and colleges notably in the Greater Accra, Central, Western and the Eastern Regions of Ghana. The spread caught the attention of the Universities, Training Colleges and Communities vibrantly. By 1993 talents were identified at the grassroots to form the juvenile teams taking part in the Cricket Quadrangular among the North West Africa Cricket playing countries at that time.

Ghana became an Affiliate Member of the ICC in 2002 and the game has continued to grow since.

==== International ====
The country competed in the ICC/ACA Division 3 of the ICC Africa World Cricket League in 2006 for the first time. Its third-place finish was hugely encouraging and it followed that up by winning the following event – in 2008 in South Africa – to gain promotion to ICC/ACA Africa Division 2.

Ghana more than held its own in the 2010 ICC Africa World Cricket League Division 2 held in Benoni, South Africa in April as it finished in second place to maintain its spot for the next event. A record of just one defeat in six matches – that to title winners Zambia – augurs well for the future.

It was no surprise that Ghana became a force to reckon with in the 2011 edition of the ICC/ACA Africa Regional Division 2 T-20 Tournament placing second to gain promotion to the Africa Regional Division 1 event in Uganda the same year and also gained a promotion to play at ICC Global Division 8 in 2012.

However first time appearance in the ICC/ACA Africa Regional Division 1 T-20 Tournament was evident as the team placed fifth out of the five countries event in Uganda.

Ghana showed its capacity to hold international events when it successfully hosted the ICC/ACA Division 3 T- 20 in Accra in February 2011.

With increased Government support for the lesser known sports, the establishment of cricket in schools is underway via a vibrant national cricket development program and plans are afoot to establish more cricket grounds.

==== Domestic structure ====
The GCA supervises the Accra Invitational League, Captain Series, The Diwali League, Girls Quadrangular Competitions and Interschool's Cricket Competition.

The Ghana Cricket Association has shown commitment in promoting the sport in Ghana, with educational institutions like the University of Ghana, Ghana International School, Ashantigold Schools, Achimota School and other public basic schools now taken up the sport.

=== Judo ===
Judo was introduced into Ghana in the early 1960's by the late President Dr. Kwame Nkrumah. It was introduced to numbers of the young pioneers club of Ghana. During this same time, some French expatiates working with CFAO open a dojo at their office in Accra.

In 1960, Mr. Tony Turkson now a reverend minister opened a club in Accra at the National Arts Center. Two other clubs were later opened at the police and Army training schools.

In 1973, a Japanese mission was in Ghana through the sponsorship of the Japan foreign ministry to demonstrate the art of Judo to Ghanaians. In 1974, the Japanese Mission sent another delegation as part of a cultural exchange program. During this same period, three army personnels were sent to Britain for three months training. Two other police officers were sent to Kodokan, Japan for two years. Upon these happenings the Ghana Judo Association was formed.

From the year 1974, Judo has become a recognized national sports and has developed over the years.

Organizations such as Japanese International Cooperation Agency (JICA) Japanese Embassy in Ghana as well as the French Embassy have helped in the development of the sports in the country. From 1976 – 2002, eleven Japanese coaches have helped the Ghana Judo Association to develop Judo. Some Ghanaians have also gotten the chance to study abroad. Two Ghanaians namely Andy Williams and Schandorf were in Egypt for 10 months and 6 months respectively. Over the years five Ghanaians have also been to Japan to study judo through the sponsorship of JICA. In 2003, another Ghanaian had a three-month study in Germany. In 2005, under the Olympic solidarity scholarship, another judo player was sent to Hungary for three months.

At the moment judo is being practiced in many parts of the country as many people from all walks of life are enrolling daily to take judo lessons for self-defence, as a sport and to keep them fit.

=== Handball ===
Handball was introduced to Ghana in 1975, by Mr. S. K. Hlordze then Deputy Chief Sport's Organizer of the National Sports Council and Mr. Katé Caesar, then a visiting lecturer at Specialist Training College – P. E Department, Winneba, now and the University of Education.

In August 2006, Ghana's women's National Team won the African Challenge Trophy [Africa Cup] held in Lome – Togo.

=== Table tennis ===
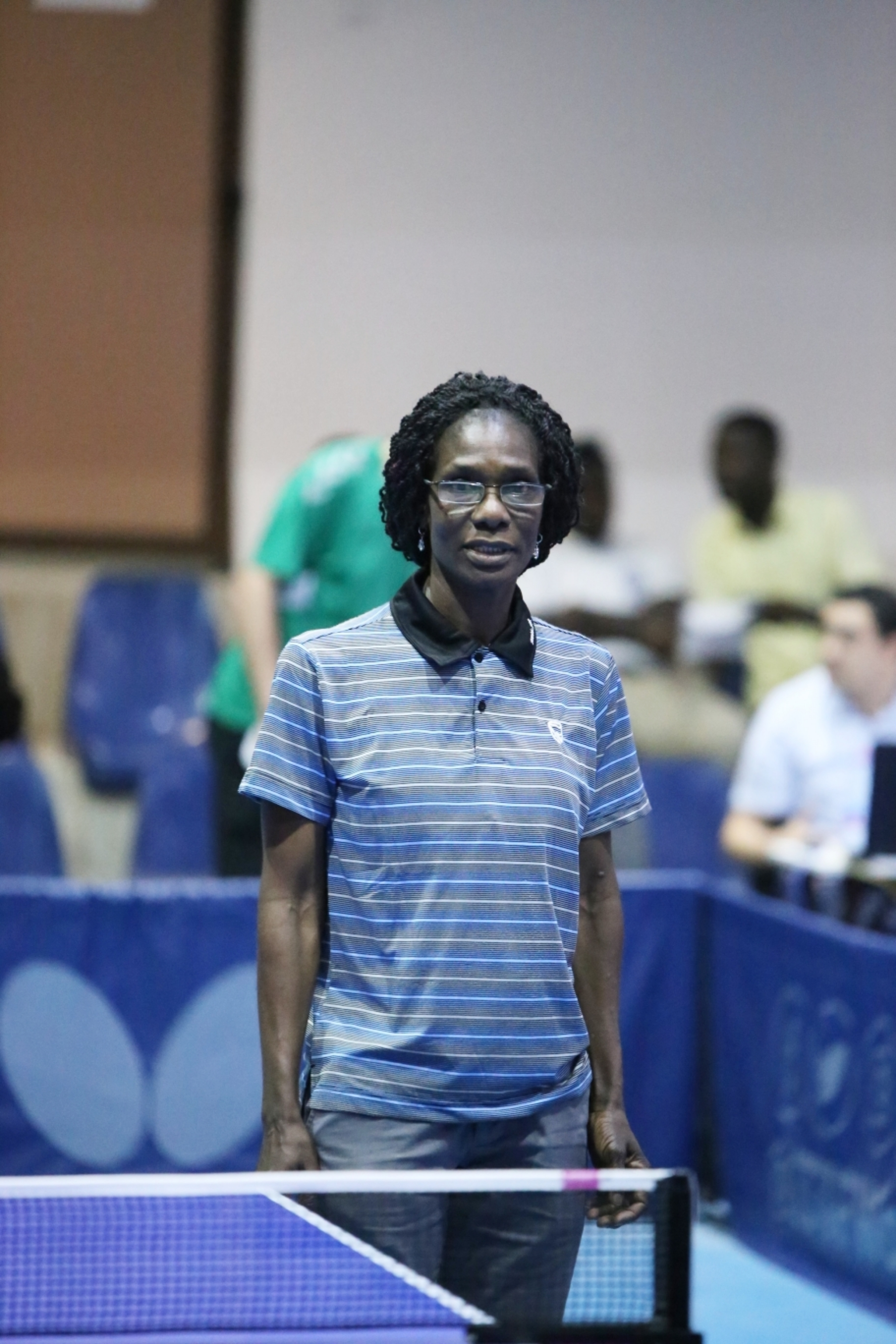
Esther Lamptey, in 2019.

Table Tennis had long started in the 1940's. However, history of organized Table Tennis in Ghana can be traced from the arrival of D. G. Hathiramani, an Indian trader in the Gold Coast.

D.G Hathiramani, a good player himself, teamed up with other enthusiastic Gold Coast local players like Dr. S.B Laing, J.W Mullings, E.N Nettey and many others to form the Gold Coast Table Tennis Association in 1951. Hathiramani captained the Gold Coast team to win the AZIKIWE CUP in Lagos, Nigeria.

About three years later, Hathiramani retired as an active player and took to coaching.

In 1954, Hathiramani established a table tennis school at the Accra Y.M.C.A (Young Men Christian Association). He produced a lot of good players. Some prominent ones included E.A Quaye, Okine Quaye, Samuel Hammond, Joseph Quansah, Ethel Jacks, Theresa and Ernestina Akuetteh, Helena Amankwah, Esther Lamptey, Patricia Akosua Offei and Patience Abena Opokua. All these players won medals for Ghana.

Ghana joined the African Table Tennis Federation (ATTF) in 1951 and the International Table Tennis Federation (ITTF) in 1961.

Okine Quaye won the Kent (England) Junior Table Tennis Tournament in 1960. In the same year E.A Quaye captured the Kent Senior Tournament.

In 1962, E.A Quaye won the Africa Men's Singles title in Cairo. However, E.A Quaye lost the title in 1964 in Accra, Ghana, but regained it in 1968 in Lagos.

E.A Quaye underwent a table tennis Basic Coaching Course in Britain in 1961 and in Beijing Institute of Physical Education in 1965.

Another prominent player of D,G Hathiramani was a half Ghanaian and half Nigerian. This young lady troubled the Nigerian team greatly. Ethel Jacks was the name. Ethel Jacks won many laurels for Ghana and herself between 1964 and 1976 at Africa and West Africa Championships.

In 1971, Ethel Jacks won the Africa Women's Singles title. After 1976 Ethel Jacks left Ghana for Nigeria and later became a coach for Nigeria.

In 1977, the GTTA and the NSC organized a one –week intensive Table Tennis Coaching Course for all regional coaches.

The coaches were housed in D.G Hathiramani's house. At the end of the course, table tennis equipment were given out to all participants. Hathiramani was affectionately called “D.G”. Until 1977, there were only two (NSC) National Sports Council paid coaches namely: E.A Quaye, in charge of the Western Region, and S.K. Allotey who was in charge of the Ashanti Region.

On January 1st 1978, Vincent Arhin, a Physical Education Assistant Superintendent teacher of the Ghana Education Service was appointed a Regional Coach to the Eastern Region. He therefore became the third National Sports Council (NSC) coach.

In December 1980, Esther Lamptey won the Africa Women's singles title in Senegal.

In 1981, the first Africa Table Tennis Coaches Intermediate course was organized under the tutelage of Mrs. Sung Meiying, the Technical Director of China Table Tennis Association and the patronage of the Nigeria Table Tennis Federation.

The Eastern Region Coach, Vincent Arhin and the B/Ahafo Region Coach, Anthony Asante participated on behalf of Ghana.

In 1985, an agreement reached between the Ghana Government and the China Government enabled Coach Vincent Arhin and a former national player, Anthony Owusu Ansah to be offered scholarship to do an advance Diploma Coaching Course in Beijing, China at the University of Physical Education.

In 1986, Coach Owusu Ansah was appointed a National Sports Council Coach to the Ashanti Region.

In 1987, Ghana's pair of Patricia Akosua Offei and Patience Abena Opokua won the Women's Doubles Event at the 7th All Africa Games in Nairobi, Kenya.

In March 1988, Ghana won gold medal by beating Nigeria in the Women's Team Event at the Africa Zone 3 Games held in Ghana. The team was handled by Coach Vincent Arhin and the players were Patricia Offei and Patience Opokua.

In the same year, table tennis became an Olympic event. Ghana was represented by Patricia Offei, Coach Arhin, Sqd. Ldr. Ebo Bartels (chairman), Ernestina Akuetteh (Chaperon) and Patience Opokua (Training Partner for Patricia Offei) in Seoul, South Korea at the 24th Olympic Games.

After the World Table Tennis Championships, Stephen Adjei and Patricia Offei failed to return to Ghana. That sparked off public outcry and brought about a decline of the Ministry's interest in table tennis until 1992 when Helena Amankwah and Patience Opokua featured at the 25th Olympic Games in Barcelona, Spain. Coach S.K. Allotey (deceased) and the leader of the team, Kwabena Yeboah of GTV fame, were in attendance.

The Ghana Education Service (GES) and the National Sports Council jointly organized a National U-10 table tennis and soccer training programs for children in Accra for 3 months.

The maiden championship involving five countries saw Ghana's contingent winning all their matches. Ghana, Togo, Benin, Côte d'Ivoire and Burkina Faso were involved.

In 1993, Ghana Education Service and the National Sports Council (NSC) collaborated to train U-12 players in table tennis and soccer. Tutelage of table tennis was placed under Coach Vincent Arhin (NSC) while soccer was handled by Coach Akuetteh Armah (NSC) Wahab (GES) and Yaw Adu (GES). Ghana beat Benin in both table tennis and soccer.

In 1994, CADBURY (GH) Ltd sponsored a 2-Year Bournvita Table Tennis Developmental and Promotional program throughout the country to uplift the image and level of the game.

Schools and clubs were given table tennis tables, posts and nets assemblies. Bournvita T-shirts were also given out to all participants.

In 1995, Ghana's Isaac Opoku from Eastern Region qualified amongst the top 6 Africa players. After qualifying at the Africa qualification competition in Lagos, E. A. Quaye was appointed the first GTTA Chief Coach.

In 1996, Ghana's Olympic team of Isaac Opoku (Singles) and Winfred Addy (Doubles partner), Coach E.A Quaye and Hornsby Odoi were at the 26th Olympic Games in Atlanta, USA. In 1997, Ghana participated at the Manchester World Table Tennis Championships. The players were Gifty Mensah, Lydia Cleyland, Comfort Danso, Eric Hammond and Seth Darko.

On 26 December 1998, Ghana buried one of their most industrious coaches, S.K. Allotey.

On 26 January 1999, Coach Arhin became the second GTTA Chief Coach after Coach E.A. Quaye. Subsequently, Coach Arhin was transferred from the Eastern Region to the Headquarters of the National Sports Council in Accra. Ghana participated in the 45th World Table Tennis Championships.

Participants were Coach Vincent Arhin, Esther Lamptey, Hagar Amo and Eric Amoah who absconded at the end of the championship in Eindhoven, Netherlands.

The Secretary-General, Ashalley Okine was present.

In 2000, the Greater Accra Table Tennis Academy was formed to reactivate the game in the capital city of Ghana Accra, by the Chief Coach, Vincent Arhin.

The academy was inaugurated by the Deputy Minister of Sports, Mr. Sylvester Azantilo, under the direction of the Ag. Chief Executive of NSC, Brigadier Brock. In 2001, the academy played friendly matches with the Togolese national team.

In each case, the academy was victorious. The sponsors were Next Door Restaurant, Mr. Kudjoe Fianoo and Mr. Richard Quarshie, both members of the Ghana Football Association. In 2002, to stop favoritism, nepotism and tribalism in the selection of national players for international assignments, the Chief Coach, Mr. Arhin introduced the point system.

This was accepted by both the Association and the playing body. That enabled the Black Loopers to train constantly to win for the first time in Twenty (20) years a BRONZE medal in the Men's Team Event at the 8TH All Africa Games in Abuja, Nigeria in 2003. In March 2003, Ghana participated in the 47th World Table Tennis Championships in Paris, France. Nana Yaw Boateng, Eric Amoah and Eric Hammond were ranked 897, 898 and 899, respectively.

The team was accompanied by Coach Vincent Arhin and Sqd. Ldr. Ebo Bartels as chairman. TIBHAR Co. Ltd and the Ghana Table Tennis Association signed a contract at the championship. Tibhar Company was to support the GTTA for two (2) years.

In July 2003, Ghana was represented by 5 men and 2 women at the 8th All Africa Games held in Abuja. Bronze medal was won in the Men's Team Event. In 2004, the 13th Africa Youth Championships was held in Ghana. Ghana won 3 Bronze Medals. Ghana was disqualified for allowing Solomon Akonor, an above 18-year-old player, to feature in the Under-18 category.

Solomon Akonor who failed to submit his passport for scrutiny was banned for 2 years. The Chief Coach, Mr. Vincent Ankama Arhin, was transferred to the Western Region. The Chief Coach appealed against his sanction at the Commission for Human Right and Administrative Justice (CHRAJ). After investigations and interaction with the NSC, CHRAJ ruled in favour of the Chief Coach.

The Chief Coach was reinstated at his post in 2005. However, Ghana won 3 bronze medals at the 13th youth championships in the boys doubles event, under 18 boys team event and girls under 15 singles. Akosua Ketu qualified for the World Cadet Championship held in Portugal in 2005. Coach Owusu Addo handled Akosua Ketu at the Championship in Portugal.

Between 2003 and 2005, the Chief Coach was appointed a part-time lecturer at the University of Cape Coast.

He turned out 99 students coaches. In 2005, Ghana was represented at the 48th World Table Tennis Championships by the nation's No.1 player, Nana Yaw Boateng and Sqd. Ldr.

Ebo Bartels the Chairman of GTTA in Shangai, China. In 2006, the Chief Coach, Vincent Arhin, retired at the age of 60 years. He was however, contracted to work as the Technical Coordinator of Table Tennis programs to train the youth to become seasoned coaches. Coach Anthony Owusu Ansah became an acting chief coach of the GTTA.

At the Australia Commonwealth Games in 2006, Ghana was represented by Eric Amoah, Mohammed Ali, Nana Yaw Boateng, Bernard Joe Sam, Coach Owusu Ansah and Sqd. Ldr. Ebo Bartels. Ghana placed 14th out of 26 participating countries.

=== Lacrosse ===
In 2019, Ghana became the 3rd African nation (after Kenya and Uganda) to be admitted into the global World Lacrosse Federation.

=== Tennis ===
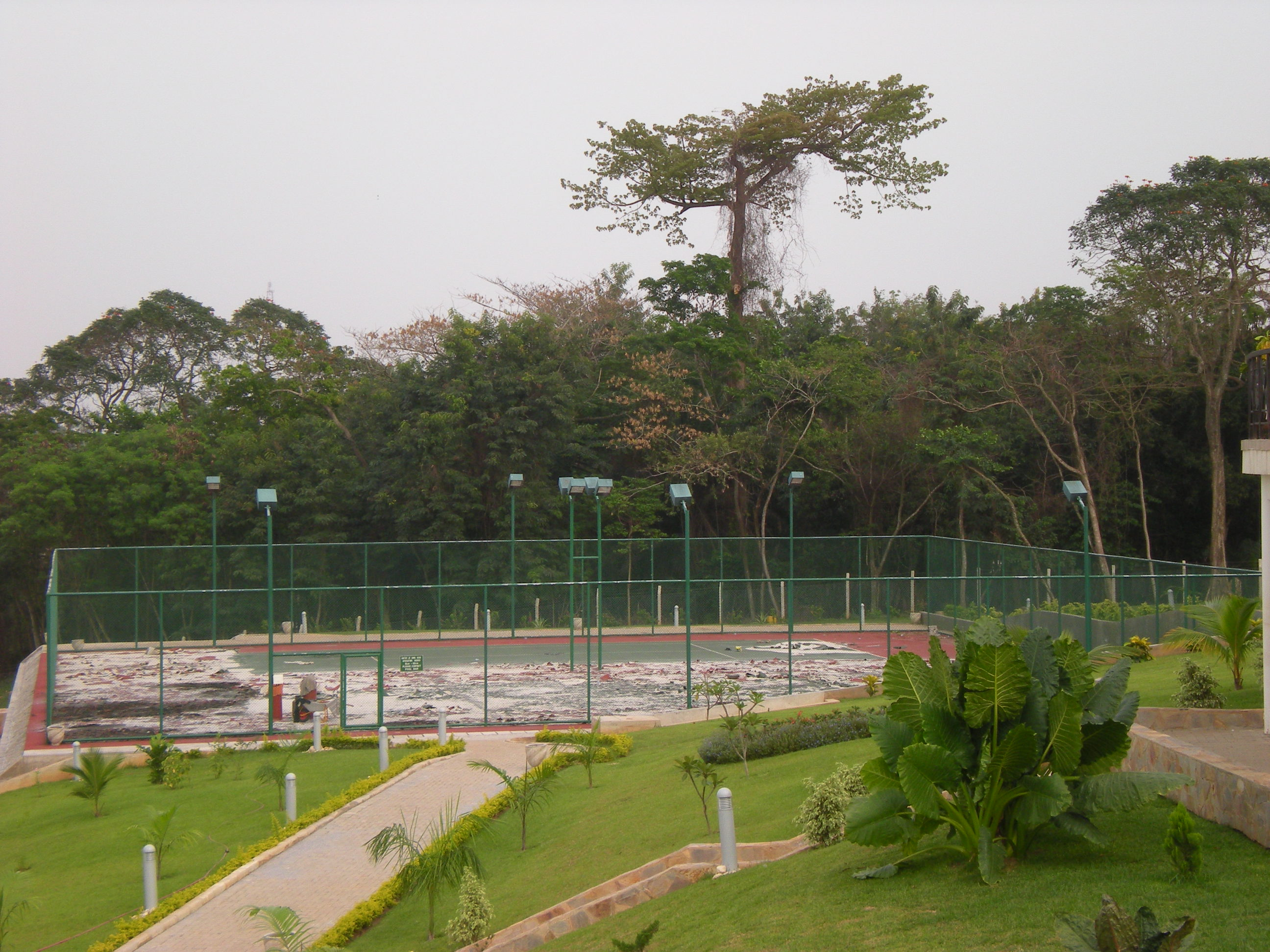
Tennis Court with burning off of coating in Kumasi, Ashanti Region.

Tennis is another sport that is played in Ghana. However there has not been any noteworthy international success.

=== Netball ===
The game of Netball which developed from woman's basketball was introduced into the then gold coast by the missionaries who brought education into the country. Netball was therefore initially played in schools and colleges in Ghana.

In the 1960's and 1970's, Netball was very popular in the country and regular Netball competitions were played in schools and colleges across the country with the finals being held at the then Accra Sports Stadium now OHENE DJAN SPORTS STADIUM.

Good exponents of the game of Netball in those days- the early 1970's were Kadjebi Secondary School (Snr. High School), Offinso Training College, Wesley College Kumasi and Osu Presby Secondary Schools (Snr. High School) and the basic school level.

Netball was also very popular and up to the 1974/75 academic year, Netball was included in the National Basic Schools sports festival program regularly.

During the era of the Central Organization of Sport (C.O.S) under the era of Ohene Djan, he established a Desk at the C.O.S in charge of Netball, which liaised with the schools and College Sports Federation for the organization of Netball tournaments and the promotion of Netball in the country.

=== Karate ===
The sport was first introduced to the country in the 1990's which is run by the Ghana Karate Do Association.

== Criticism ==
In the past, Ghana's sports authorities have often cut the funding for many sports disciplines in order to ever increase the funds available to its football (soccer) programs. Because of this decision, several sports events on the African continent such as the African Games have seen limited Ghanaian participation.

== See also ==
- Chaskele
