= Sanae Agalmam =

Moroccan karateka

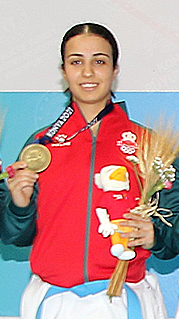

Sport
- Country: Morocco
- Sport: Karate
- Events: Individual kata; Team kata
Medal record
Women's karate
Representing Morocco
African Games
Gold medal – first place	2019 Rabat	Individual kata
Gold medal – first place	2019 Rabat	Team kata
Silver medal – second place	2023 Accra	Team kata
African Karate Championships
Gold medal – first place	2019 Gaborone	Individual kata
Gold medal – first place	2019 Gaborone	Team kata
Silver medal – second place	2018 Kigali	Individual kata
African Beach Games
Gold medal – first place	2019 Sal	Individual kata
Gold medal – first place	2019 Sal	Team kata
Islamic Solidarity Games
Gold medal – first place	2021 Konya	Team kata

Sanae Agalmam is a Moroccan karateka. She represented Morocco at the 2019 African Games and she won the gold medal in the women's individual kata event. She also won the gold medal in the women's team kata event.

== Career ==
In 2018, she competed in the women's individual kata event at the World Karate Championships held in Madrid, Spain.

She represented Morocco at the 2019 African Beach Games held in Sal, Cape Verde where she won the gold medal both in the women's individual and women's team kata events. She also won the gold medal in the women's individual kata and women's team kata events at the 2019 African Karate Championships. At the 2018 African Karate Championships, she won the silver medal in the women's individual kata event.

In June 2021, she competed at the World Olympic Qualification Tournament held in Paris, France hoping to qualify for the 2020 Summer Olympics in Tokyo, Japan. In October 2021, she won the silver medal in her event at the 2021 Mediterranean Karate Championships held in Limassol, Cyprus.

She won the gold medal in the women's team kata event at the 2021 Islamic Solidarity Games held in Konya, Turkey.
