= Nigeria at the 2019 African Beach Games =

- Flag of Nigeria
- IOC code: NGR

in Sal, Cape Verde 14 June 2019 – 23 June 2019
- Medals Ranked 7th: Gold 1 Silver 2 Bronze 4 Total 7

African Beach Games appearances
- 2019; 2023

Nigeria competed at the inaugural African Beach Games in Sal, Cape Verde from 14 to 23 June 2019. In total, athletes representing Nigeria won one gold medal, two silver medals and four bronze medals. The country finished in 7th place in the medal table.

== Medal summary ==
Medals by sport
Sport	1st place, gold medalist(s)	2nd place, silver medalist(s)	3rd place, bronze medalist(s)	Total
3×3 basketball	1	0	1	2
Beach soccer	0	0	1	1
Beach tennis	0	1	0	1
Coastal rowing	0	1	2	3

=== Medalists ===
Medal	Name	Sport	Event
Gold	Josette Awasnem	3×3 basketball	Women's shootout
Silver	Blessing Audu; Christie Agugbom	Beach tennis	Women's doubles
Silver	Michael Moses; Esther Toko	Coastal rowing	Mixed team
Bronze	Azibaye Mac-Dangosu; Murjanatu Musa; Nkem Akaraiwe; Josette Anaswem	3×3 basketball	Women's team
Bronze	Men's team	Beach soccer	Men's tournament
Bronze	Michael Moses	Coastal rowing	Men's singles
Bronze	Esther Toko	Coastal rowing	Women's singles
