= Botswana at the 2019 African Beach Games =

- Flag of Botswana
- IOC code: BOT

in Sal, Cape Verde 14 June 2019 – 23 June 2019
- Medals Ranked 13th: Gold 0 Silver 1 Bronze 3 Total 4

African Beach Games appearances
- 2019; 2023

Botswana competed at the inaugural African Beach Games in Sal, Cape Verde from 14 to 23 June 2019. In total, athletes representing Botswana won one silver medal and three bronze medals. All medals were won in karate. The country finished in 13th place in the medal table.

== Medal summary ==
Medals by sport
Sport	1st place, gold medalist(s)	2nd place, silver medalist(s)	3rd place, bronze medalist(s)	Total
Karate	0	1	3	4

=== Medalists ===
Medal	Name	Sport	Event
Silver	Thebe Duna; Tlotlang Ponatshego; Ofentse Bakwadi	Karate	Men's team kata
Bronze	Ofentse Bakwadi	Karate	Men's individual kata
Bronze	Entle Maungwa	Karate	Women's individual kata
Bronze	Centy Kgosikoma; Lame Hetanang; Entle Maungwa	Karate	Women's team kata
