= Riham Senani =

Algerian long-distance runner

Personal information
- Born: 21 November 1993 (age 32)

Sport
- Country: Algeria
- Sport: Long-distance running
Medal record
Women's athletics
Representing Algeria
African Beach Games
Gold medal – first place	2019 Sal	Half marathon

Riham Senani (born 21 November 1993) is an Algerian long-distance runner.

In 2011, she competed in the junior women's race at the 2011 IAAF World Cross Country Championships held in Punta Umbría, Spain. She finished in 48th place.

In 2017, she competed in the senior women's race at the 2017 IAAF World Cross Country Championships held in Kampala, Uganda. She finished in 84th place. In 2018, she competed in the senior women's race at the 2018 African Cross Country Championships held in Chlef, Algeria.

In 2019, she represented Algeria at the inaugural 2019 African Beach Games held in Sal, Cape Verde and she won the gold medal in the women's half marathon.
