= Lavinia Haitope =

Namibian long-distance runner

Personal information
- Nationality: Namibian
- Born: 3 March 1990 (age 36)

Sport
- Sport: Long-distance running
- Event: Marathon
Medal record
Representing Namibia
African Beach Games
Silver medal – second place	2019 Sal	Women's Half Marathon

Lavinia Haitope (born 3 March 1990) is a Namibian long-distance runner. She competed in the women's marathon at the 2017 World Championships in Athletics.

In 2018, she competed in the women's marathon at the 2018 Commonwealth Games held in Gold Coast, Australia. She finished in 7th place. In 2019, she competed in the senior women's race at the 2019 IAAF World Cross Country Championships held in Aarhus, Denmark. She finished in 52nd place. In 2019, she also represented Namibia at the 2019 African Beach Games held in Sal, Cape Verde and she won the silver medal in the women's half marathon.

In 2026, Haitope won the Total Sports Two Oceans Half Marathon in a time of 1:14:36 to secure the biggest road win of her career.
