= Aicha Sayah =

Moroccan karateka

Sport
- Country: Morocco
- Sport: Karate
- Weight class: 50 kg
- Events: Kumite; Team kumite
Medal record
Women's karate
Representing Morocco
African Games
Gold medal – first place	2019 Rabat	Kumite 50 kg
Gold medal – first place	2019 Rabat	Team kumite
Mediterranean Games
Silver medal – second place	2018 Tarragona	Kumite 50 kg

Aicha Sayah is a Moroccan karateka. She represented Morocco at the 2019 African Games held in Rabat, Morocco and she won the gold medal in the women's kumite 50 kg event. She also won the gold medal in the women's team kumite event.

In 2018, she won the silver medal in the women's kumite 50 kg event at the Mediterranean Games held in Tarragona, Spain. In the final, she lost against Jelena Milivojčević of Serbia. She won the gold medal in her event at the 2019 African Karate Championships held in Gaborone, Botswana.

In 2021, she competed at the World Olympic Qualification Tournament held in Paris, France hoping to qualify for the 2020 Summer Olympics in Tokyo, Japan.

== Achievements ==
Year	Competition	Venue	Rank	Event
2018	Mediterranean Games	Tarragona, Spain	2nd	Kumite 50 kg
2019	African Games	Rabat, Morocco	1st	Kumite 50 kg
2019	African Games	Rabat, Morocco	1st	Team kumite
