= 2019 African Beach Games =

Multi-sport event in Sal, Cape Verde

I African Beach Games
- Host city: Sal, Cape Verde
- Nations: 45
- Events: 28 events in 11 sports
- Opening: 14 June 2019
- Closing: 23 June 2019
- Website: sal2019.com

The 2019 African Beach Games were the inaugural edition of the international beach sports competition between the nations of Africa, organised by the Association of National Olympic Committees of Africa (ANOCA). The first Games were held on the island of Sal, Cape Verde in June 2019.

In the ten-day competition, a total of 45 nations competed in 28 events across 11 sports. Teqball was also included as a demonstration sport on 18 June.

The Games were awarded to the Cabo Verdean Olympic Committee (COC) at the ANOCA General Assembly in Djibouti in May 2017. The host contract was signed in March 2018 between the City Hall of Sal, the Association of National Olympic Committees of Africa (ANOCA) and the Cabo Verdean Olympic Committee (COC), to carry out of the first African Beach Games 2019.

== Branding ==
The logo is the silhouette of the African continent, while the mascot is a tortoise named Krexteu.

== Venues ==
- Santa Maria Beach Park - 3×3 Basketball, Beach handball, Coastal rowing, Beach soccer, Football freestyle, Karate, Kiteboarding, Open water swimming, Teqball (demonstration)
- Athletics Circuit - Athletics
- Arena 2 - Beach tennis, Beach volleyball

== Participating nations ==
45 out of 54 nations participated. Chad, Comoros, Eritrea, Eswatini, Ethiopia, Gabon, São Tomé and Príncipe, Somalia and South Africa did not participate.

- Algeria (71)
- Angola (7)
- Benin (2)
- Botswana (10)
- Burkina Faso (3)
- Burundi (5)
- Cameroon (3)
- Cape Verde (78)
- Central African Republic (3)
- Republic of the Congo (4)
- Ivory Coast (8)
- Djibouti (22)
- Democratic Republic of the Congo (4)
- Egypt (2)
- Equatorial Guinea (10)
- The Gambia (6)
- Ghana (10)
- Guinea (6)
- Guinea-Bissau (3)
- Kenya (40)
- Lesotho (2)
- Liberia (1)
- Libya (6)
- Madagascar (2)
- Malawi (2)
- Mali (9)
- Mauritania (5)
- Mauritius (11)
- Morocco (39)
- Mozambique (5)
- Namibia (10)
- Niger (4)
- Nigeria (34)
- Rwanda (1)
- Senegal (14)
- Seychelles (7)
- Sierra Leone (25)
- South Sudan (6)
- Sudan (2)
- Tanzania (2)
- Togo (26)
- Tunisia (35)
- Uganda (2)
- Zambia (1)
- Zimbabwe (2)

== Calendar ==
OC	Opening ceremony	●	Event competitions	1	Gold medal events	CC	Closing ceremony

June	14th Fri	15th Sat	16th Sun	17th Mon	18th Tue	19th Wed	20th Thu	21st Fri	22nd Sat	23rd Sun	Events
Ceremonies	OC									CC	
3x3 basketball							●	●	2	2	4
Athletics			2								2
Beach handball	●	●	2								2
Beach soccer						●	●	1	●	1	2
Beach tennis	●	1	2								3
Beach volleyball						●	●	●	●	2	2
Coastal rowing	●	3									3
Football freestyle			2								2
Karate	2	2									4
Kiteboarding						●	●	2			4
Open water swimming			2								2
Daily medal events	2	6	10	0	0	0	0	3	2	5	28
Cumulative total	2	8	18	18	18	18	18	21	23	28	28
June	14th Fri	15th Sat	16th Sun	17th Mon	18th Tue	19th Wed	20th Thu	21st Fri	22nd Sat	23rd Sun	Events

== Medal table ==
* Host nation (Cape Verde)

Rank	NOC	Gold	Silver	Bronze	Total
1	Morocco (MAR)	9	3	4	16
2	Algeria (ALG)	5	6	5	16
3	Tunisia (TUN)	3	3	1	7
4	Cape Verde (CPV)*	3	2	5	10
5	Mauritius (MRI)	2	2	0	4
6	Mali (MLI)	2	1	1	4
7	Nigeria (NGR)	1	2	4	7
8	Uganda (UGA)	1	0	1	2
9	Mozambique (MOZ)	1	0	0	1
9	Senegal (SEN)	1	0	0	1
11	Namibia (NAM)	0	4	0	4
12	Togo (TOG)	0	2	0	2
13	Botswana (BOT)	0	1	3	4
14	Kenya (KEN)	0	1	2	3
15	Ghana (GHA)	0	1	0	1
16	Ivory Coast (CIV)	0	0	3	3
17	Burundi (BDI)	0	0	1	1
17	Djibouti (DJI)	0	0	1	1
Totals (18 entries)		28	28	31	87

== Results ==
=== 3×3 Basketball ===
Event	Gold	Silver	Bronze
Men's team	Mali (MLI); Mamadou Keïta; Gaoussou Koné; Badara Bagayoko; Benke Diarouma	Algeria (ALG); Touhami Ghezzoul; Mounir Bernaoui; Nadyr Labouize; Kamel Ammour	Ivory Coast (CIV); Aboubakar Traoré; Ibrahim Sevede; Adjo Bokobri; Cheick Traoré
Men's dunk contest	Anderson Correia; Cape Verde	Benke Diarouma; Mali	Aboubakar Traoré; Ivory Coast
Women's team	Mali (MLI); Assetou Diakité; Aïssata Maïga; Alima Dembélé; Assetou Sissoko	Togo (TOG); Adjovi Tossou Afanwoubo; Rachel Ndukue; Samiya Pindra; Aku Afetse	Nigeria (NGR); Azibaye Mac-Dangosu; Murjanatu Musa; Nkem Akaraiwe; Josette Anaswem
Women's shootout	Josette Awasnem; Nigeria	Victoria Netumbo; Namibia	Assetou Sissoko; Mali

=== Athletics ===
Event	Gold	Silver	Bronze
Men's half marathon	Robert Chemonges; Uganda	Charles Yosei Muneria; Kenya	Abdillahi Bouh Moumin; Djibouti
Women's half marathon	Riham Senani; Algeria	Lavinia Haitope; Namibia	Priscilla Chelangat; Uganda

=== Beach handball ===
Event	Gold	Silver	Bronze
Men's team	Tunisia (TUN); Marwane Soussi; Mohamed Maaouia; Aimen Touzi; Mohamed Ben Mida; Omar Saied; Marwen Chetioui; Ahmed Sfar; Nizar Ben Rajab; Achraf Elabed	Togo (TOG); Abdoula Modi; Komi Djokpe; Ayavi Ayivi; Mawuko Ayenou; Yaou Adjinda; Aduayi Aduayu-Akue; Aboudou Gado; Kossi Tchassanti; Ayao Boboloe	Morocco (MAR); Achraf Fliss; Ayoub Barkhane; Redwane Braout; Hicham El Harti; Hicham El Hakimy; Mehdi Ismaili Alaoui; Mohamed El Guens; Zouhair Ouasfi; Mohamed Rachid Hamed
Women's team	Tunisia (TUN); Safa Ameri; Ameni Jemmali; Leila Ouerfelli; Samira Arfaoui; Siwar Ammar; Amani Salmi; Manel Mrad; Hanen Romdhane; Boutheina Amiche	Cape Verde (CPV); Odete Tavares; Suzana Barros; Jorgeana Carvalho; Iliana Semedo; Eneida Lopes; Telma Fernandes; Rute Fernandes; Marta Coelho; Maria Correia	Algeria (ALG); Sihem Hemissi; Lina Slimani; Fatiha Haimer; Tina Salhi; Sylia Zouaoui; Feriel Belouchrani; Yamina Bensalem; Sarah Ait Habib; Kenza Makhloufi

=== Beach soccer ===
Event	Gold	Silver	Bronze
Men's team	Senegal (SEN); Djibril Gueye; Lansana Diassy; Amadou Ba; Mamadou Sylla; Mansour Diagne; Al Seyni Ndiaye; Ninou Diatta; El Hadji Mbaye; Babacar Fall; Papa Ndoye	Morocco (MAR); Rabi Aboutalbi; Zakariae Ahriga; Sami Iazal; Nassim El Hadaoui; Azzedine El Hamidy; Miloud Ennakhli; Anas El Hadaoui; Yassir Abada; Ismail El Ouariry; Ali Elkhdym	Nigeria (NGR); Benjamin Iluyomade; Godwin Iorbee; Emmanuel Ohwoferia; Azeez Abu; Hego Ogbonna; Paul Danjuma; Austin Igudia; Godwin Tale; Adams Taiwo
Women's team	Cape Verde (CPV); Jacinta Rodrigues; Melany Fortes; Joceline Martins; Rosângela Lima; Ruth Duarte; Keila Delgado; Simónica Duarte; Carolyne Tomar; Vânia Lobo; Vanda Graça	Algeria (ALG); Amina Haleyi; Rayane Doumi; Samar Benhamouda; Kamilia Boutiara; Rania Boudellal; Romaissa Boudiaf; Meriem Haleyi; Wafa Bencheikh; Khadidja Nefissa; Sarah Derbal	Not awarded

https://roonbasports.com/beachsoccer/men/2019.html

https://roonbasports.com/beachsoccer/women/2019.html

=== Beach tennis ===
Event	Gold	Silver	Bronze
Men's doubles	Morocco (MAR); Youssef Ghazouani; Anass Bouaouda	Mauritius (MRI); Fabrice Nayna; Etienne Fleurie	Kenya (KEN); Fazal Khan; Ibrahim Yego
Women's doubles	Morocco (MAR); Camilla Benabdeljalil; Sarah Benabdeljalil	Nigeria (NGR); Blessing Audu; Christie Agugbom	Cape Verde (CPV); Silvia Nascimento; Jocilene Fernandes
Mixed doubles	Morocco (MAR); Anass Bouaouda; Camilla Benabdeljalil	Morocco (MAR); Youssef Ghazouani; Sarah Benabdeljalil	Cape Verde (CPV); Anderson Neves; Jocilene Fernandes

=== Beach volleyball ===
Event	Gold	Silver	Bronze
Men's team	Mozambique (MOZ); Delcio Soares; Aldevino Nguvo	Ghana (GHA); Samuel Essilfie; Kelvin Carboo	Morocco (MAR); Mohammed Abicha; Zouheir El Graoui
Women's team	Morocco (MAR); Nora Nezha Jihane Darrhar; Imane Zeroual	Namibia (NAM); Julia Laggner; Kim Seebach	Kenya (KEN); Naomie Too; Gaudencia Makokha

=== Coastal rowing ===
Event	Gold	Silver	Bronze
Men's singles	Oussama Habiche; Algeria	Mohamed Mansouri; Tunisia	Michael Moses; Nigeria
Women's singles	Sarra Zammali; Tunisia	Amina Rouba; Algeria	Esther Toko; Nigeria
Mixed team	Algeria (ALG); Oussama Habiche; Amina Rouba	Nigeria (NGR); Michael Moses; Esther Toko	Tunisia (TUN); Mohamed Mansouri; Sarra Zammali

=== Football freestyle ===
Event	Gold	Silver	Bronze
Men's individual battles	Othmane Djedidi; Morocco	Nicholas Barros; Cape Verde	Noureddine Saïdi; Algeria
Men's individual routines	Nicholas Barros; Cape Verde	Noureddine Saïdi; Algeria	Othmane Djedidi; Morocco

=== Karate ===
Event	Gold	Silver	Bronze
Men's individual kata	Mohammed El-Hanni; Morocco	Mouad Ouites; Algeria	Ofentse Bakwadi; Botswana
Men's individual kata	Mohammed El-Hanni; Morocco	Mouad Ouites; Algeria	Songuida Sanogo; Ivory Coast
Men's team kata	Algeria (ALG); Samir Lakrout; Mouad Ouites; Haoua Abdelhakim	Botswana (BOT); Thebe Duna; Tlotlang Ponatshego; Ofentse Bakwadi	Cape Verde (CPV); Mauro Soares; José Mendes Gonçalves; Leonardo Ramos
Men's team kata	Algeria (ALG); Samir Lakrout; Mouad Ouites; Haoua Abdelhakim	Botswana (BOT); Thebe Duna; Tlotlang Ponatshego; Ofentse Bakwadi	Burundi (BDI); Nkeshimana Elvis; Ntiruseseka Herve; Mukeshimana Brillant
Women's individual kata	Sanae Agalmam; Morocco	Suzelle Pronk; Namibia	Entle Maungwa; Botswana
Women's individual kata	Sanae Agalmam; Morocco	Suzelle Pronk; Namibia	Manal Kamilia Hadj Saïd; Algeria
Women's team kata	Morocco (MAR); Sanae Agalmam; Aya En-Nesyry; Lamiae Bertali	Algeria (ALG); Manal Kamilia Hadj Saïd; Sara Hanouti; Rayane Salakedji	Botswana (BOT); Centy Kgosikoma; Lame Hetanang; Entle Maungwa
Women's team kata	Morocco (MAR); Sanae Agalmam; Aya En-Nesyry; Lamiae Bertali	Algeria (ALG); Manal Kamilia Hadj Saïd; Sara Hanouti; Rayane Salakedji	Cape Verde (CPV); Sophia Évora; Danisa Conceição; Silviane Mendes

=== Kitesurfing ===
Event	Gold	Silver	Bronze
Men's boardercross	Jean Lauri Fenouillot; Mauritius	Luis Drany Clair; Mauritius	Ahmed Boudjatit; Algeria
Men's foilracing	Jean Lauri Fenouillot; Mauritius	Hicham Tirya; Morocco	Luis Duarte; Cape Verde

=== Open water swimming ===
Event	Gold	Silver	Bronze
Men's 5 km	Mathy Mathieu Ben Rahou; Morocco	Haithem Mbarki; Tunisia	Ali Merouane Betka; Algeria
Women's 5 km	Sara Moualfi; Algeria	Alya Gara; Tunisia	Ayat Allah Elanouar; Morocco

== Demonstration result ==
=== Teqball ===
Event	Gold	Silver	Bronze
Men's	Cameroon; Hubert Noah Essomba; Gregory Tchami-Djomaha	Nigeria; Thankgod Adindu; Emmanuel Nwabueze	Cape Verde; Ekson da Graça; Rodirley Duarte
