= Uganda at the 2019 African Beach Games =

- Flag of Uganda
- IOC code: UGA

in Sal, Cape Verde 14 June 2019 – 23 June 2019
- Medals Ranked 8th: Gold 1 Silver 0 Bronze 1 Total 2

African Beach Games appearances
- 2019; 2023

Uganda competed at the inaugural African Beach Games in Sal, Cape Verde from 14 to 23 June 2019. In total, athletes representing Uganda won one gold medal and one bronze medal. The country finished in 8th place in the medal table.

== Medal summary ==
Medals by sport
Sport	1st place, gold medalist(s)	2nd place, silver medalist(s)	3rd place, bronze medalist(s)	Total
Athletics	1	0	1	2

=== Medalists ===
Medal	Name	Sport	Event
Gold	Robert Chemonges	Athletics	Men's half marathon
Bronze	Priscilla Chelangat	Athletics	Women's half marathon
