= GKF =

GKF may refer to:

- GMA Kapuso Foundation, the Philippines
- Ghana Karate Do Association
