= Robert Chemonges =

Ugandan athlete

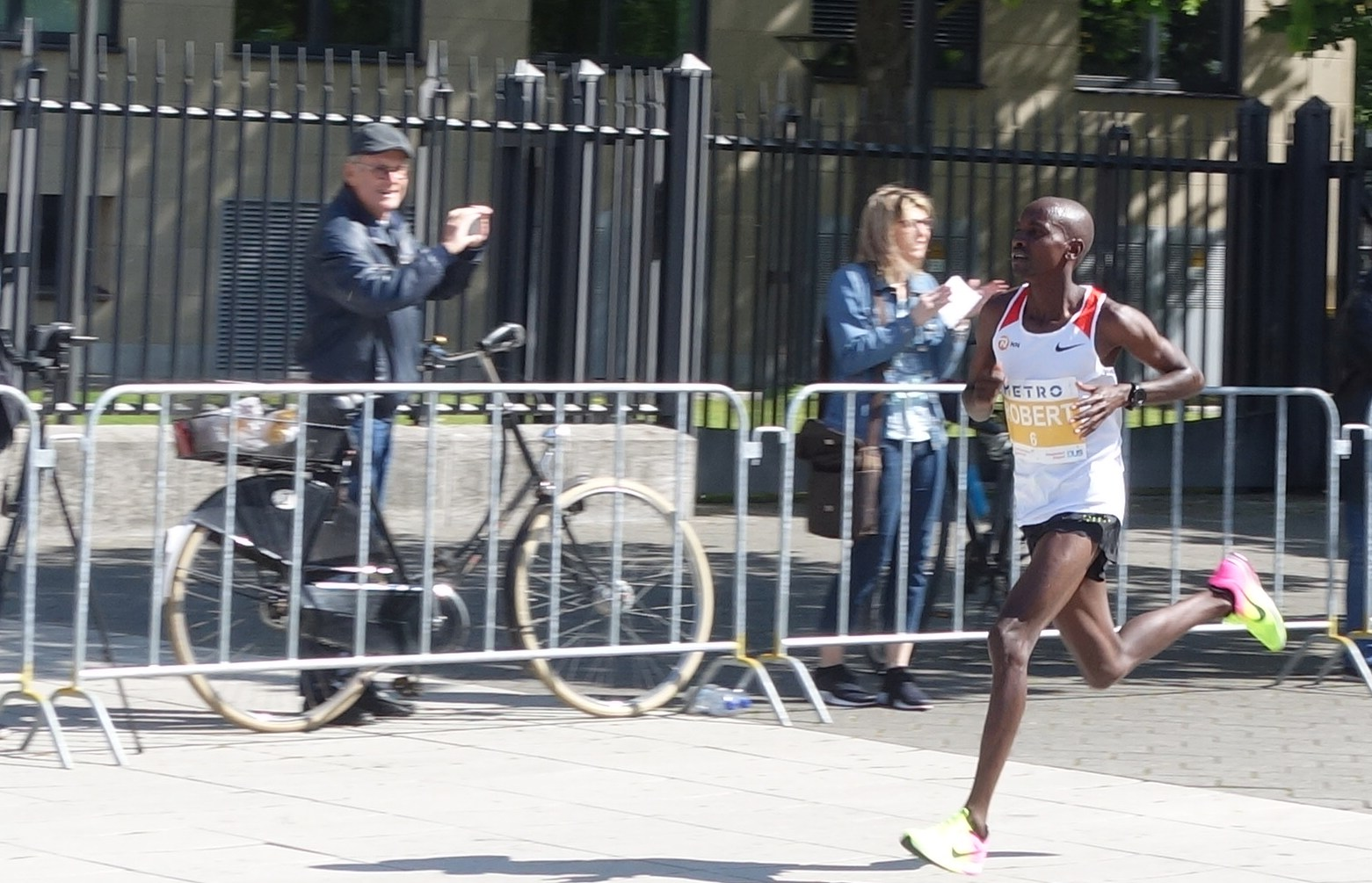
- Robert Chemonges in 2017

Personal information
- Nationality: Ugandan
- Born: 15 October 1997 (age 28)

Sport
- Sport: Road running Mountain running
- Event: Marathon
Medal record
Representing Uganda
African Beach Games
Gold medal – first place	2019 Sal	Men's Half Marathon

Robert Chemonges (born 15 October 1997) is a Ugandan long distance runner. He competed in the men's marathon at the 2017 World Championships in Athletics, placing 43rd in the time of 2:21:24. He won the men's half marathon event at the inaugural African Beach Games in 2019 with a time of 1:04:48.
