= Kenya at the 2019 African Beach Games =

- Flag of Kenya
- IOC code: KEN

in Sal, Cape Verde 14 June 2019 – 23 June 2019
- Medals Ranked 14th: Gold 0 Silver 1 Bronze 2 Total 3

African Beach Games appearances
- 2019; 2023

Kenya competed at the inaugural African Beach Games in Sal, Cape Verde from 14 to 23 June 2019. In total, athletes representing Kenya won one silver medal and two bronze medals. The country finished in 14th place in the medal table.

== Medal summary ==
Medals by sport
Sport	1st place, gold medalist(s)	2nd place, silver medalist(s)	3rd place, bronze medalist(s)	Total
Athletics	0	1	0	1
Beach tennis	0	0	1	1
Beach volleyball	0	0	1	1

=== Medalists ===
Medal	Name	Sport	Event
Silver	Charles Yosei Muneria	Athletics	Men's half marathon
Bronze	Fazal Khan; Ibrahim Yego	Beach tennis	Men's doubles
Bronze	Naomie Too; Gaudencia Makokha	Beach volleyball	Women's team
