= Mali at the 2019 African Beach Games =

- Flag of Mali
- IOC code: MLI

in Sal, Cape Verde 14 June 2019 – 23 June 2019
- Medals Ranked 6th: Gold 2 Silver 1 Bronze 1 Total 4

African Beach Games appearances
- 2019; 2023

Mali competed at the inaugural African Beach Games in Sal, Cape Verde from 14 to 23 June 2019. In total, athletes representing Mali won two gold medals, one silver medal and one bronze medal. The country finished in 6th place in the medal table.

== Medal summary ==
Medals by sport
Sport	1st place, gold medalist(s)	2nd place, silver medalist(s)	3rd place, bronze medalist(s)	Total
3×3 basketball	2	1	1	4

=== Medalists ===
Medal	Name	Sport	Event
Gold	Mamadou Keïta; Gaoussou Koné; Badara Bagayoko; Benke Diarouma	3×3 basketball	Men's team
Gold	Assetou Diakité; Aïssata Maïga; Alima Dembélé; Assetou Sissoko	3×3 basketball	Women's team
Silver	Benke Diarouma	3×3 basketball	Men's dunk contest
Bronze	Assetou Sissoko	3×3 basketball	Women's shootout
