= Cape Verde at the 2019 African Beach Games =

- Flag of Cape Verde
- IOC code: CPV

in Sal, Cape Verde 14 June 2019 – 23 June 2019
- Medals Ranked 4th: Gold 3 Silver 2 Bronze 5 Total 10

African Beach Games appearances
- 2019; 2023

Cape Verde competed at the inaugural African Beach Games in Sal, Cape Verde from 14 to 23 June 2019. In total, athletes representing Cape Verde won three gold medals, two silver medals and five bronze medals. The country finished in 4th place in the medal table.

== Medal summary ==
Medals by sport
Sport	1st place, gold medalist(s)	2nd place, silver medalist(s)	3rd place, bronze medalist(s)	Total
3×3 basketball	1	0	0	1
Beach handball	0	1	0	1
Beach soccer	1	0	0	1
Beach tennis	0	0	2	2
Football freestyle	1	1	0	2
Karate	0	0	2	2
Kitesurfing	0	0	1	1

=== Medalists ===
Medal	Name	Sport	Event
Gold	Anderson Correia	3×3 basketball	Men's dunk contest
Gold	Women's team	Beach soccer	Women's tournament
Gold	Nicholas Barros	Football freestyle	Men's individual routines
Silver	Women's team	Beach handball	Women's tournament
Silver	Nicholas Barros	Football freestyle	Men's individual battles
Bronze	Silvia Nascimento; Jocilene Fernandes	Beach tennis	Women's doubles
Bronze	Anderson Neves; Jocilene Fernandes	Beach tennis	Mixed doubles
Bronze	Mauro Soares; José Mendes Gonçalves; Leonardo Ramos	Karate	Men's team kata
Bronze	Sophia Evora; Danisa Conceicao; Silviane Mendes	Karate	Women's team kata
Bronze	Luis Duarte	Kitesurfing	Men's foilracing
