= Karate at the 2019 African Games =

- Venue: Prince Moulay Abdallah Sports Complex
- Location: Rabat, Morocco
- Dates: 24–26 August
- Competitors: 233 from 32 nations

Karate at the 2019 African Games was held from 24 to 26 August 2019 in Rabat, Morocco.

== Participating nations ==
- Algeria (19)
- Angola (3)
- Benin (1)
- Botswana (20)
- Burkina Faso (10)
- Burundi (1)
- Cameroon (10)
- Cape Verde (4)
- Chad (9)
- Republic of the Congo (11)
- Democratic Republic of the Congo (5)
- Djibouti (1)
- Egypt (20)
- Equatorial Guinea (2)
- Ethiopia (8)
- Gabon (4)
- Ghana (5)
- Kenya (10)
- Libya (3)
- Madagascar (7)
- Mali (6)
- Mauritania (1)
- Mauritius (5)
- Morocco (19)
- Mozambique (2)
- Namibia (6)
- Niger (3)
- Nigeria (8)
- Senegal (13)
- Sierra Leone (2)
- South Africa (3)
- Tunisia (12)

== Medal table ==
* Host nation (Morocco)

Rank	Nation	Gold	Silver	Bronze	Total
1	Morocco (MAR)*	9	4	2	15
2	Egypt (EGY)	2	8	4	14
3	Algeria (ALG)	2	2	9	13
4	Tunisia (TUN)	2	1	1	4
5	Cameroon (CMR)	1	0	4	5
6	Republic of the Congo (CGO)	0	1	1	2
7	Botswana (BOT)	0	0	4	4
8	Senegal (SEN)	0	0	3	3
9	Benin (BEN)	0	0	1	1
9	Burkina Faso (BUR)	0	0	1	1
9	Gabon (GAB)	0	0	1	1
9	Nigeria (NGR)	0	0	1	1
Totals (12 entries)		16	16	32	64

== Medal summary ==
=== Men ===
Event	Gold	Silver	Bronze
Kata individual	Mohammed El Hanni; Morocco	Ahmed Shawky; Egypt	Ofentse Bakwadi; Botswana
Kata individual	Mohammed El Hanni; Morocco	Ahmed Shawky; Egypt	Abdelhakim Haoua; Algeria
Kata team	Morocco; Bilal Ben Kacem; Adnnan El Hakimi; Mohammed El Hanni	Egypt; Youssef Hammad; Mohamed Sayed; Ahmed Shawky	Botswana; Ofentse Bakwadi; Vincent Magalie; Boemo Ramasimong
Kata team	Morocco; Bilal Ben Kacem; Adnnan El Hakimi; Mohammed El Hanni	Egypt; Youssef Hammad; Mohamed Sayed; Ahmed Shawky	Algeria; Abdelhakim Haoua; Samir Lakrout; Mouad Ouites
Kumite -60 kg	Malek Salama; Egypt	Abdessalam Ameknassi; Morocco	Nader Azzouzi; Tunisia
Kumite -60 kg	Malek Salama; Egypt	Abdessalam Ameknassi; Morocco	Fallou Beye; Senegal
Kumite -67 kg	Abderrahmmane Eddaqaq; Morocco	Mohamed Bouakel; Algeria	Jean Marc Kollo Ndzomo; Cameroon
Kumite -67 kg	Abderrahmmane Eddaqaq; Morocco	Mohamed Bouakel; Algeria	Aly Ismail; Egypt
Kumite -75 kg	Etienne Nonani Bayomog; Cameroon	Abdalla Abdelaziz; Egypt	Nguema Marie; Gabon
Kumite -75 kg	Etienne Nonani Bayomog; Cameroon	Abdalla Abdelaziz; Egypt	Yassine Sekouri; Morocco
Kumite -84 kg	Thamer Slimani; Tunisia	Nabil Ech-chaabi; Morocco	Anis Brahimi; Algeria
Kumite -84 kg	Thamer Slimani; Tunisia	Nabil Ech-chaabi; Morocco	Abdou Cisse; Senegal
Kumite +84 kg	Achraf Ouchen; Morocco	Hocine Daikhi; Algeria	Hope Adele; Nigeria
Kumite +84 kg	Achraf Ouchen; Morocco	Hocine Daikhi; Algeria	Taha Mahmoud; Egypt
Kumite team	Algeria; Mouad Achache; Abdelkrim Bouamria; Samy Brahimi Anis; Hocine Daikhi; Karim Belghini; Yanis Lardjane; Faical Bouakal	Morocco; Achraf Ouchen; Abdessalam Ameknassi; Yassine Sekouri; Leaie Benhenia; Mohammed El Bahry; Nabil Ech-chaabi; Ali Youb	Botswana; Koolopile Tsaone Lemogang; Ramasimong Gabriel; Ponatshego Tlotlang; Duna Thebe; Tsenene Katlego; Motlhabi Mogakolodi; Batlhomile Dan
Kumite team	Algeria; Mouad Achache; Abdelkrim Bouamria; Samy Brahimi Anis; Hocine Daikhi; Karim Belghini; Yanis Lardjane; Faical Bouakal	Morocco; Achraf Ouchen; Abdessalam Ameknassi; Yassine Sekouri; Leaie Benhenia; Mohammed El Bahry; Nabil Ech-chaabi; Ali Youb	Egypt; Abdalla Abdelaziz; Ismail Aly Sayed; Ali El-Sawy; Mohamed Ahmed Ramadan; Youssef Badawy; Hanafy Magdy Mamdouh; Mahmoud Taha Tarek

=== Women ===
Event	Gold	Silver	Bronze
Kata individual	Sanae Agalmam; Morocco	Sarah Sayed; Egypt	Manel Kamilia Hadj Said; Algeria
Kata individual	Sanae Agalmam; Morocco	Sarah Sayed; Egypt	Akele Akele; Cameroon
Kata team	Morocco; Sanae Agalmam; Lamiae Bertali; Aya En-Nesyry	Egypt; Toka Hesham Mohamed; Asmaa Mahmoud; Shahd Sedek	Algeria; Manal Kamilia Hadj Saïd; Sarah Hanouti; Rayane Salakedji
Kata team	Morocco; Sanae Agalmam; Lamiae Bertali; Aya En-Nesyry	Egypt; Toka Hesham Mohamed; Asmaa Mahmoud; Shahd Sedek	Botswana; Centy Kgosikoma; Lesego Masimola; Entle Maungwa
Kumite -50 kg	Aicha Sayah; Morocco	Radwa Sayed; Egypt	Imane Taleb; Algeria
Kumite -50 kg	Aicha Sayah; Morocco	Radwa Sayed; Egypt	Diabate Pembe Fatoumata; Republic of the Congo
Kumite -55 kg	Yassmin Attia; Egypt	Khawla Ouhammad; Morocco	Oceanne Mylene Ganiero; Benin
Kumite -55 kg	Yassmin Attia; Egypt	Khawla Ouhammad; Morocco	Widad Draou; Algeria
Kumite -61 kg	Chaima Midi; Algeria	Bouthaina Hasnaoui Ep Lomonaco; Tunisia	Giana Lotfy; Egypt
Kumite -61 kg	Chaima Midi; Algeria	Bouthaina Hasnaoui Ep Lomonaco; Tunisia	Btissam Sadini; Morocco
Kumite -68 kg	Nissrine Brouk; Morocco	Feryal Abdelaziz; Egypt	Blandine Ghislaine Angana Mendo; Cameroon
Kumite -68 kg	Nissrine Brouk; Morocco	Feryal Abdelaziz; Egypt	Lamya Matoub; Algeria
Kumite +68 kg	Chehinez Jemi; Tunisia	Menna Shaaban Okila; Egypt	Gloria Rachel Noela Guissou; Burkina Faso
Kumite +68 kg	Chehinez Jemi; Tunisia	Menna Shaaban Okila; Egypt	Ogandoa Nsioma Stella; Cameroon
Kumite team	Morocco; Khawla Ouhammad; Fatima-Zahra Chajai; Btissam Sadini; Aicha Sayah	Republic of the Congo; Yan Pacelie Robson Franck; Michadee Babindamana; Fatoumata Diabate Pembe	Senegal; Maman Amina Dione; Magatte Seck; Maguette Mbaye; Mariama Sow
Kumite team	Morocco; Khawla Ouhammad; Fatima-Zahra Chajai; Btissam Sadini; Aicha Sayah	Republic of the Congo; Yan Pacelie Robson Franck; Michadee Babindamana; Fatoumata Diabate Pembe	Algeria; Lamya Matoub; Widad Draou; Chaima Midi; Nadege Ait Ibrahim
