= Ghana at the 2019 African Beach Games =

- Flag of Ghana
- IOC code: GHA

in Sal, Cape Verde 14 June 2019 – 23 June 2019
- Medals Ranked 15th: Gold 0 Silver 1 Bronze 0 Total 1

African Beach Games appearances
- 2019; 2023

Ghana competed at the inaugural African Beach Games in Sal, Cape Verde from 14 to 23 June 2019. In total, athletes representing Ghana won one silver medal and the country finished in 15th place in the medal table.

== Medal summary ==
Medals by sport
Sport	1st place, gold medalist(s)	2nd place, silver medalist(s)	3rd place, bronze medalist(s)	Total
Beach volleyball	0	1	0	1

=== Medalists ===
Medal	Name	Sport	Event
Silver	Samuel Essilfie; Kelvin Carboo	Beach volleyball	Men's team
