= 2026 African Beach Handball Championship =

International beach handball competition

The 2026 African Beach Handball Championship is the inaugural edition of the continental tournament organized by the Confederation of African Handball. It is held in Lomé from 24 to 27 April 2026.

The tournament also serves as a qualification event for the 2026 IHF Men's and Women's Beach Handball World Championships, scheduled to take place in Zagreb, with the winners of both the men's and women's competitions earning qualification.

Six national teams participate in the men's tournament: Tunisia, Benin, Togo, Ivory Coast, Mali, and Kenya. The women's competition features four teams: Benin, Togo, Mali, and Kenya.

The competition format consists of a single round-robin group stage. In the men's tournament, each team plays the others once, while in the women's tournament, teams play each other twice. The top two teams in each competition advance to the semi-finals, followed by the final to determine the champions.

This edition marks the first standalone African championship for beach handball and aims to promote the development of the sport across the continent while strengthening its presence in international competitions.

== Draw ==
The tournament was held in Lomé, Togo from 24 to 27 April 2026, under the supervision of the Confederation of African Handball (CAHB).

=== Men's Championship ===
Teams
Tunisia
Benin
Togo
Ivory Coast
Mali
Kenya

=== Women's Championship ===
Teams
Benin
Togo
Mali
Kenya

== Men's tournament ==
=== Group stage ===
Pos	Team	Pld	W	L	Pts	SW	SL	SR	SPW	SPL	SPR	Qualification
1	Tunisia	4	4	0	8	8	0	MAX	162	96	1.688	Semifinals
2	Togo (H)	4	3	1	6	6	2	3.000	140	79	1.772	Semifinals
3	Benin	4	2	2	4	4	4	1.000	118	116	1.017	Semifinals
4	Mali	4	1	3	2	2	6	0.333	64	106	0.604	Semifinals
5	Ivory Coast	4	0	4	0	0	8	0.000	60	147	0.408	

Source: CAHB
Rules for classification: 1) Points; 2) Head-to-head points; 3) Head-to-head set difference; 4) Head-to-head points won; 5) Set difference; 6) Points won; 7) Draw.
(H) Host

24 April 2026; 08:30	Tunisia	2–0	Benin
24 April 2026; 08:30	(14–10, 24–13)

24 April 2026; 10:10	Togo	2–0	Ivory Coast
24 April 2026; 10:10	(22–3, 26–8)

24 April 2026; 15:00	Tunisia	2–0	Ivory Coast
24 April 2026; 15:00	(20–6, 16–9)

24 April 2026; 15:50	Mali	0–2 (w/o)	Togo
24 April 2026; 15:50	(0–10, 0–10)

25 April 2026; 09:30	Tunisia	2–0	Mali
25 April 2026; 09:30	(22–9, 20–13)

25 April 2026; 10:20	Ivory Coast	0–2	Benin
25 April 2026; 10:20	(11–19, 10–23)

25 April 2026; 15:00	Mali	2–0	Ivory Coast
25 April 2026; 15:00	(12–7, 9–6)

25 April 2026; 15:50	Togo	2–0	Benin
25 April 2026; 15:50	(18–13, 18–9)

26 April 2026; 09:30	Mali	0–2	Benin
26 April 2026; 09:30	(9–16, 12–15)

26 April 2026; 10:20	Togo	0–2	Tunisia
26 April 2026; 10:20	(16–22, 20–24)

=== Semifinals ===
26 April 2026; 16:05	Tunisia	2–0	Mali
26 April 2026; 16:05	(11–5, 23–12)

26 April 2026; 16:55	Togo	2–0	Benin
26 April 2026; 16:55	(20–10, 13–12)

=== Third place game ===
27 April 2026; 14:30	Benin	1–2	Mali
27 April 2026; 14:30	(12–4, 8–9, 2–6)

=== Final ===
27 April 2026; 16:40	Tunisia	2–0	Togo
27 April 2026; 16:40	(19–18, 18–16)

== Women's tournament ==
=== Group stage ===
Pos	Team	Pld	W	L	Pts	SW	SL	SR	SPW	SPL	SPR	Qualification
1	Togo (H)	4	3	1	6	6	2	3.000	80	62	1.290	Final
2	Benin	4	2	2	4	5	4	1.250	82	71	1.155	Final
3	Mali	4	1	3	2	2	7	0.286	59	88	0.670	

Source: CAHB
Rules for classification: 1) Points; 2) Head-to-head points; 3) Head-to-head set difference; 4) Head-to-head points won; 5) Set difference; 6) Points won; 7) Draw.
(H) Host

24 April 2026; 11:00	Togo	2–0	Mali
24 April 2026; 11:00	(8–2, 12–8)

24 April 2026; 16:40	Togo	0–2	Benin
24 April 2026; 16:40	(10–12, 2–6)

25 April 2026; 11:10	Benin	1–2	Mali
25 April 2026; 11:10	(8–6, 6–8, 4–6)

25 April 2026; 16:40	Mali	0–2	Togo
25 April 2026; 16:40	(8–12, 8–10)

26 April 2026; 11:10	Mali	0–2	Benin
26 April 2026; 11:10	(10–11, 3–17)

26 April 2026; 15:15	Benin	0–2	Togo
26 April 2026; 15:15	(6–13, 12–13)

=== Final ===
27 April 2026; 15:20	Togo	1–2	Benin
27 April 2026; 15:20	(15–11, 10–14, 5–6)
