= Mauritius at the 2019 African Beach Games =

- Flag of Mauritius
- IOC code: MRI

in Sal, Cape Verde 14 June 2019 – 23 June 2019
- Medals Ranked 5th: Gold 2 Silver 2 Bronze 0 Total 4

African Beach Games appearances
- 2019; 2023

Mauritius competed at the inaugural African Beach Games in Sal, Cape Verde from 14 to 23 June 2019. In total, athletes representing Mauritius won two gold medals and two silver medals. The country finished in 5th place in the medal table.

== Medal summary ==
Medals by sport
Sport	1st place, gold medalist(s)	2nd place, silver medalist(s)	3rd place, bronze medalist(s)	Total
Beach tennis	0	1	0	1
Kitesurfing	2	1	0	3

=== Medalists ===
Medal	Name	Sport	Event
Gold	Jean Lauri Fenouillot	Kitesurfing	Men's boardercross
Gold	Jean Lauri Fenouillot	Kitesurfing	Men's foilracing
Silver	Fabrice Nayna; Etienne Fleurie	Beach tennis	Men's doubles
Silver	Luis Drany Clair	Kitesurfing	Men's boardercross
