= Karim Belghini =

Algerian karateka

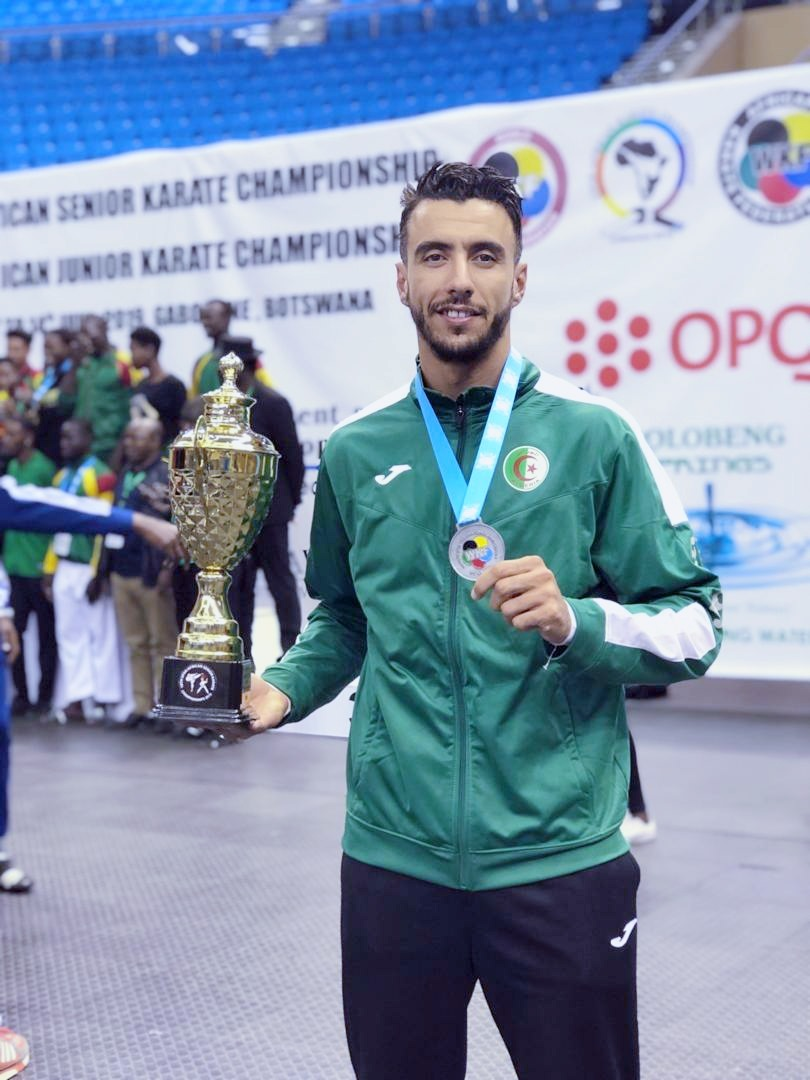

Personal information
- Born: 23 June 1993 (age 33)
- Weight: 84 kg (185 lb)

Sport
- Country: Algeria
- Sport: Karate
- Event: Kumite
Medal record
Men's karate
Representing Algeria
Event	1st	2nd	3rd
African Games	1	0	0
African Karate Championships	0	1	1
Arab Police Championship	0	2	0
US Open	0	0	1
Fonseca Cup	1	0	0
Total	2	3	2
African Games
Gold medal – first place	2019 Rabat	Team kumite
African Karate Championships
Bronze medal – third place	2018 Kigali	Team kumite
Silver medal – second place	2019 Gaborone	Team kumite
Arab Police Championship
Silver medal – second place	2021 Algiers	Team kumite
Silver medal – second place	2021 Algiers	kumite -84kg
Us Open
Bronze medal – third place	2022 Las Vegas	kumite -84 kg
Fonseca Cup
Gold medal – first place	2023 Chicago	WKF (18-34) male kumite

Karim Belghini is an Algerian karateka, he is a two-times medalist in the African championship including a silver medalist at the African championship held in Gaborone, Botswana and a bronze at The African championship too held in Kigali, Rwanda, he won the gold medal at the (African games), he has Also won medals in individual and team event in several editions of international karate competitions and tournament.

== Career ==
In November 2018, he represented Algeria at the( 2018 Karate World Championship) in the men's team kumite held in Madrid, Spain.

He won the bronze medal in men's team kumite event at the 2018 African championship held in kigali, Rwanda.

He won the silver medal in the men's team kumite event at the 2019 African karaté championship held in Gaborone, Botswana.

He represented Algeria at the (2019 African games) and he won the gold medal in the men's team kumite event.

He won the silver medal at the 2021 Arab police karate championship in -84 kg kumite , he Also won of the silver medal in the men's team kumite event held in Algiers, Algeria.

At the 2022 US Open held in las Vegas, USA, he won the bronze medal in the (18_34) male elite -84 kg kumite event.

He participated at the 2023 karate 1 serie A held in Athens, Greece and got seventh place in the - 84 kg kumite event.

He won the gold medal in the (18-34) WKF male kumite event at the 2023 Fonseca Cup held in Chicago, USA.

== Achievements ==
Year	Competition	Venue	Rank	Event
2018	African Karate Championships	Kigali, Rwanda	3rd	Team kumite
2019	African Karate Championships	Gaborone, Botswana	2nd	Team kumite
2019	African Games	Rabat, Morocco	1st	Team kumite
2021	Arab Police Championship	Algiers, Algerie	2nd	Team kumite
2021	Arab Police Championship	Algiers, Algerie	2nd	Kumite -84 kg
2022	Us open	Las Vegas, USA	3rd	Kumite -84 kg
2023	Fonseca Cup	Chicago , USA	1st	(18-34) WKF male kumite
