= Malek Salama =

Egyptian karateka (born 1997)

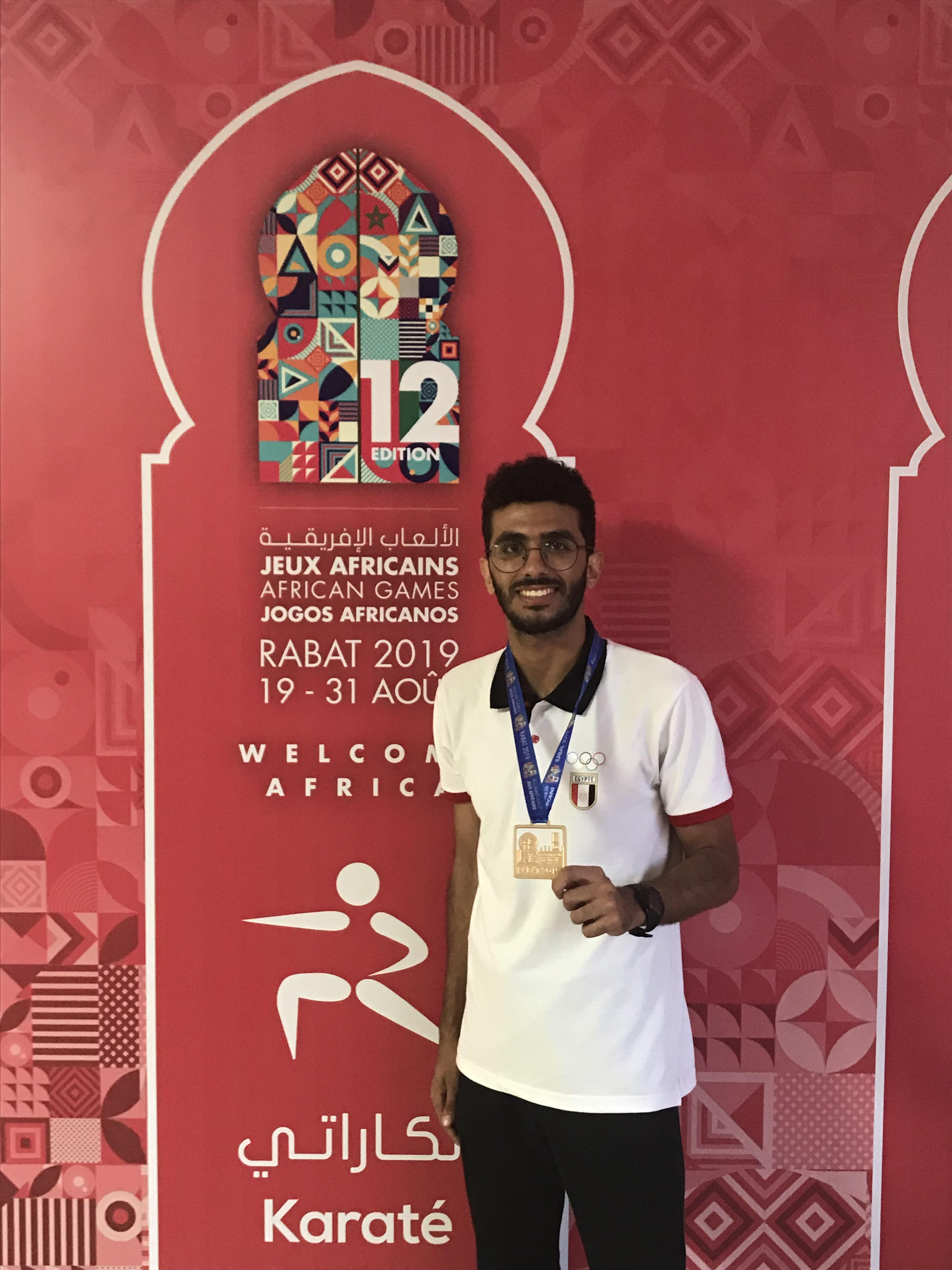

Personal information
- Full name: Malek Gomaa Salama Hussien
- Born: 1 February 1997 (age 29) Cairo, Egypt
- Height: 176 cm (5 ft 9 in)
- Weight: 60 kg (132 lb)

Sport
- Country: Egypt
- Sport: Karate
- Position: Player
Medal record
Men's karate
Representing Egypt
African Games
Gold medal – first place	2019 Rabat	Kumite 60 kg
Bronze medal – third place	2014 Gaborone	Kumite 55 kg
Mediterranean Games
Bronze medal – third place	2018 Tarragona	Kumite 60 kg
World Championships juniors
Gold medal – first place	2013 Guadalajara	Kumite 55 kg
World Championships U21
Bronze medal – third place	2017 Tenerife	Kumite 60 kg
African Championship
Gold medal – first place	2018 Rwanda	Kumite Team
Bronze medal – third place	2018 Rwanda	Kumite 60 kg
Silver medal – second place	2019 Gaborone	Kumite 60 kg
Bronze medal – third place	2020 Tangier	Kumite 60 kg

Malek Salama (born 1 February 1997, Cairo, Egypt) is an Egyptian karateka. He is a member of the Egyptian Karate national team. He represented his country in several competitions including world, continental and Karate1. In 2013, he won his first World Gold Medal at the World Cadet, Junior and U21 Karate Championships in 2013. In 2019, he represented Egypt at the 2019 African Games and he won the gold medal in the men's kumite 60 kg event.

At the 2018 Mediterranean Games in Tarragona, Catalonia, Spain, he won one of the bronze medals in the men's kumite 60 kg event.
