= Mozambique at the 2019 African Beach Games =

- Flag of Mozambique
- IOC code: MOZ

in Sal, Cape Verde 14 June 2019 – 23 June 2019
- Medals Ranked 9th: Gold 1 Silver 0 Bronze 0 Total 1

African Beach Games appearances
- 2019; 2023

Mozambique competed at the inaugural African Beach Games in Sal, Cape Verde from 14th to the 23rd of June 2019. In total, athletes representing Mozambique won one gold medal and the country finished in 9th place in the medal table.

== Medal summary ==
Medals by sport
Sport	1st place, gold medalist(s)	2nd place, silver medalist(s)	3rd place, bronze medalist(s)	Total
Beach volleyball	1	0	0	1

=== Medalists ===
Medal	Name	Sport	Event
Gold	Delcio Soares; Aldevino Nguvo	Beach volleyball	Men's team
