= Senegal at the 2019 African Beach Games =

- Flag of Senegal
- IOC code: SEN

in Sal, Cape Verde 14 June 2019 – 23 June 2019
- Medals Ranked 9th: Gold 1 Silver 0 Bronze 0 Total 1

African Beach Games appearances
- 2019; 2023

Senegal competed at the inaugural African Beach Games in Sal, Cape Verde from 14 to 23 June 2019. In total, athletes representing Senegal won one gold medal and the country finished in 9th place in the medal table.

== Medal summary ==
Medals by sport
Sport	1st place, gold medalist(s)	2nd place, silver medalist(s)	3rd place, bronze medalist(s)	Total
Beach soccer	1	0	0	1

=== Medalists ===
Medal	Name	Sport	Event
Gold	Djibril Gueye; Lansana Diassy; Amadou Ba; Mamadou Sylla; Mansour Diagne; Al Seyni Ndiaye; Ninou Diatta; El Hadji Mbaye; Babacar Fall; Papa Ndoye	Beach soccer	Men's team
