= Mouad Ouites =

Algerian karateka

Sport
- Country: Algeria
- Sport: Karate
- Events: Individual kata; Team kata
Medal record
Men's karate
Representing Algeria
African Games
Bronze medal – third place	2019 Rabat	Team kata
African Beach Games
Gold medal – first place	2019 Sal	Team kata
Silver medal – second place	2019 Sal	Individual kata
African Karate Championships
Gold medal – first place	2018 Kigali	Team kata
Silver medal – second place	2020 Tangier	Team kata
Silver medal – second place	2021 Cairo	Team kata
Bronze medal – third place	2019 Gaborone	Individual kata
Bronze medal – third place	2019 Gaborone	Team kata
Bronze medal – third place	2020 Tangier	Individual kata

Mouad Ouites is an Algerian karateka. He represented Algeria at the 2019 African Games and he won one of the bronze medals in the men's team kata event.

In 2018, he competed in the men's individual kata event at the World Karate Championships held in Madrid, Spain.

In 2019, he also competed at the African Beach Games held in Sal, Cape Verde where he won the silver medal in the men's individual kata event. He also won the gold medal in the men's team kata event.

At the 2019 African Karate Championships, he won one of the bronze medals in the men's individual kata event. In 2021, he won the silver medal in the men's team kata event at the African Karate Championships held in Cairo, Egypt.
