= Macedonia at the 2018 Mediterranean Games =

- IOC code: MKD
- NOC: Olympic Committee of North Macedonia

in Tarragona, Spain 22 June 2018 – 1 July 2018
- Competitors: 72 in 15 sports
- Medals Ranked 17th: Gold 2 Silver 1 Bronze 3 Total 6

Mediterranean Games appearances
- 2013; 2018; 2022

Other related appearances
- Yugoslavia (1951–1991)

Macedonia competed at the 2018 Mediterranean Games in Tarragona, Spain from 22 June to 1 July 2018.

== Medals ==
Medals by sport
Sport	1st place, gold medalist(s)	2nd place, silver medalist(s)	3rd place, bronze medalist(s)	Total	Rank
Karate	1	0	2	3	5
Taekwondo	0	1	0	1	8
Wrestling	1	0	1	2	5

== Medalists ==
Medal	Name	Sport	Event	Date
Gold	Magomedgaji Nurov	Wrestling	Men's Freestyle 97 Kg	26 June
Gold	Berat Jakupi	Karate	Men's Less than 84 Kg	24 June
Silver	Dejan Georgievski	Taekwondo	Men's More than 80 Kg	28 June
Bronze	Dejan Mitrov	Wrestling	Men's Freestyle 74 Kg	26 June
Bronze	Nenad Kelebikj	Karate	Men's Less than 67 Kg	23 June
Bronze	Zharko Arsovski	Karate	Men's More than 84 Kg	24 June

== Karate ==
Berat Jakupi won the gold medal in the men's kumite 84 kg event. Nenad Kelebikj won one of the bronze medals in the men's kumite 67 kg event. Zharko Arsovski won one of the bronze medals in the men's kumite +84 kg event.
