= Tunisia at the 2023 African Beach Games =

- Flag of Tunisia
- IOC code: TUN

in Hammamet, Tunisia 24 June 2023 – 30 June 2023
- Medals Ranked 2nd: Gold 13 Silver 13 Bronze 14 Total 40

African Beach Games appearances
- 2019; 2023

Tunisia competed at the second African Beach Games in Hammamet, Tunisia from 24 to 30 June 2023. In total, athletes representing Tunisia won thirteen gold medals, thirteen silver medals and fourteen bronze medals. The country finished in 2nd place in the medal table.

== Medal summary ==
Medals by sport
Sport	1st place, gold medalist(s)	2nd place, silver medalist(s)	3rd place, bronze medalist(s)	Total
3×3 Basketball	1	0	1	2
Beach handball	2	0	0	2
Beach karate	0	1	1	2
Beach tennis	1	0	1	2
Beach volleyball	0	1	0	1
Beach wrestling	0	0	4	4
Coastal rowing	5	0	0	5
Open water swimming	0	0	1	1
Paddle	0	0	2	2
Sea kayak	0	1	1	2
Teqball	1	0	1	2
Wushu Kung Fu	4	10	4	18
