= Togo at the 2019 African Beach Games =

- Flag of Togo
- IOC code: TOG

in Sal, Cape Verde 14 June 2019 – 23 June 2019
- Medals Ranked 12th: Gold 0 Silver 2 Bronze 0 Total 2

African Beach Games appearances
- 2019; 2023

Togo competed at the inaugural African Beach Games in Sal, Cape Verde from 14 to 23 June 2019. In total, athletes representing Togo won two silver medals and the country finished in 12th place in the medal table.

== Medal summary ==
Medals by sport
Sport	1st place, gold medalist(s)	2nd place, silver medalist(s)	3rd place, bronze medalist(s)	Total
3×3 basketball	0	1	0	1
Beach handball	0	1	0	1

=== Medalists ===
Medal	Name	Sport	Event
Silver	Adjovi Tossou Afanwoubo; Rachel Ndukue; Samiya Pindra; Aku Afetse	3×3 basketball	Women's team
Silver	Abdoula Modi; Komi Djokpe; Ayavi Ayivi; Mawuko Ayenou; Yaou Adjinda; Aduayi Aduayu-Akue; Aboudou Gado; Kossi Tchassanti; Ayao Boboloe	Beach handball	Men's team
