= Abdessalam Ameknassi =

Moroccan karateka

Sport
- Country: Morocco
- Sport: Karate
- Weight class: 60 kg
- Event: Kumite
Medal record
Men's karate
Representing Morocco
World Championships
Bronze medal – third place	2018 Madrid	Kumite 60 kg
African Games
Silver medal – second place	2019 Rabat	Kumite 60 kg
Silver medal – second place	2019 Rabat	Team kumite
Mediterranean Games
Gold medal – first place	2018 Tarragona	Kumite 60 kg

Abdessalam Ameknassi is a Moroccan karateka. He won one of the bronze medals in the men's kumite 60 kg event at the 2018 World Karate Championships held in Madrid, Spain.

At the 2018 Mediterranean Games held in Tarragona, Spain, he won the gold medal in the men's kumite 60 kg event.

He won the gold medal in his event at the 2019 African Karate Championships held in Gaborone, Botswana. He also won one of the bronze medals in the men's team kumite event. He represented Morocco at the 2019 African Games held in Rabat, Morocco and he won the silver medal in the men's kumite 60 kg event. He also won the silver medal in the men's team kumite event.

== Achievements ==
Year	Competition	Venue	Rank	Event
2018	Mediterranean Games	Tarragona, Spain	1st	Kumite 60 kg
2018	World Championships	Madrid, Spain	3rd	Kumite 60 kg
2019	African Games	Rabat, Morocco	2nd	Kumite 60 kg
2019	African Games	Rabat, Morocco	2nd	Team kumite
