= Ofentse Bakwadi =

Botswana karateka

Sport
- Country: Botswana
- Sport: Karate
- Event: Kata
Medal record
Men's karate
Representing Botswana
African Games
Bronze medal – third place	2015 Brazzaville	Individual kata
Bronze medal – third place	2019 Rabat	Individual kata
Bronze medal – third place	2019 Rabat	Team kata
African Beach Games
Silver medal – second place	2019 Sal	Team kata
Bronze medal – third place	2019 Sal	Individual kata
African Karate Championships
Bronze medal – third place	2019 Gaborone	Individual kata

Ofentse Bakwadi is a Botswana karateka. He represented Botswana at the 2019 African Games and he won one of the bronze medals in the men's individual kata event. He also won one of the bronze medals in the men's team kata event.

In 2018, he competed in the men's individual kata event at the World Karate Championships held in Madrid, Spain.

In 2019, he also competed at the African Beach Games held in Sal, Cape Verde where he won one of the bronze medals in the men's individual kata event. He also won the silver medal in the men's team kata event. At the 2019 African Karate Championships held in Gaborone, Botswana, he won one of the bronze medals in the men's individual kata event. In that same year, he also competed in the men's individual kata event at the 2019 World Beach Games held in Doha, Qatar without winning a medal.
