= Djibouti at the 2019 African Beach Games =

- Flag of Djibouti
- IOC code: DJI

in Sal, Cape Verde 14 June 2019 – 23 June 2019
- Medals Ranked 17th: Gold 0 Silver 0 Bronze 1 Total 1

African Beach Games appearances
- 2019; 2023

Djibouti competed at the inaugural African Beach Games in Sal, Cape Verde from 14 to 23 June 2019. In total, athletes representing Djibouti won one bronze medal and the country finished in 17th place in the medal table.

== Medal summary ==
Medals by sport
Sport	1st place, gold medalist(s)	2nd place, silver medalist(s)	3rd place, bronze medalist(s)	Total
Athletics	0	0	1	1

=== Medalists ===
Medal	Name	Sport	Event
Bronze	Abdillahi Bouh Moumin	Athletics	Men's half marathon
