= 2023 IHF Beach Handball Global Tour =

Tournament details
- Venue(s): 4
- Teams: 28 (from 5 confederations)

The 2023 Beach Handball Global Tour is the second season of the Beach Handball Global Tour, an elite Beach handball circuit organized by the International Handball Federation (IHF)

== Men's tour ==
=== Summary ===
Stage	Host	1st place	2nd place	3rd place	4th place
1; 26–30 April	(Brazil); Maricá	Brazil	Argentina	Portugal	Uruguay
2; 20–22 June	(Tunisia); Hammamet	Tunisia	Morocco	Algeria	Togo
3; 22–23 July	(Poland); Płock	Denmark	Croatia	Qatar	Poland
FINALS; 3–4 November	(Qatar); Doha	Qatar	Brazil	Denmark	Tunisia

=== Participating nations ===
Nation	(Brazil) R1	(Tunisia) R2	(Poland) R3	(Qatar) FR
Algeria		3rd		
Argentina	2nd			
Brazil	1st			2nd
Chile	6th			
Croatia			2nd	
Denmark			1st	3rd
Morocco		2nd		
Poland			4th	
Portugal	3rd			
Qatar			3rd	1st
Togo		4th		
Tunisia		1st		4th
United States	5th			
Uruguay	4th			
Total	6	4	4	4

== Women's tour ==
=== Summary ===
Stage	Host	1st place	2nd place	3rd place	4th place
1; 26–30 April	(Brazil); Maricá	Brazil	Argentina	United States	Mexico
2; 20–22 June	(Tunisia); Hammamet	Tunisia	Kenya	Algeria	Mali
3; 22–23 July	(Poland); Płock	Germany	Denmark	Poland	Croatia
FINALS; 3–4 November	(Qatar); Doha	Brazil	Poland	China	Tunisia

=== Participating nations ===
Nation	(Brazil) R1	(Tunisia) R2	(Poland) R3	(Qatar) FR
Algeria		3rd		
Argentina	2nd			
Brazil	1st			1st
Chile	5th			
China				3rd
Croatia			4th	
Denmark			2nd	
Germany			1st	
Kenya		2nd		
Mali		4th		
Mexico	4th			
Poland			3rd	2nd
Tunisia		1st		4th
United States	3rd			
Total	5	4	4	4
