= Namibia at the 2019 African Beach Games =

- Flag of Namibia
- IOC code: NAM

in Sal, Cape Verde 14 June 2019 – 23 June 2019
- Medals Ranked 11th: Gold 0 Silver 4 Bronze 0 Total 4

African Beach Games appearances
- 2019; 2023

Namibia competed at the inaugural African Beach Games in Sal, Cape Verde from 14 to 23 June 2019. In total, athletes representing Namibia won four silver medals and the country finished in 11th place in the medal table.

== Medal summary ==
Medals by sport
Sport	1st place, gold medalist(s)	2nd place, silver medalist(s)	3rd place, bronze medalist(s)	Total
3×3 basketball	0	1	0	1
Athletics	0	1	0	1
Beach volleyball	0	1	0	1
Karate	0	1	0	1

=== Medalists ===
Medal	Name	Sport	Event
Silver	Victoria Netumbo	3×3 basketball	Women's shootout
Silver	Lavinia Haitope	Athletics	Women's half marathon
Silver	Julia Laggner; Kim Seebach	Beach volleyball	Women's team
Silver	Suzelle Pronk	Karate	Women's individual kata
