= Tunisia at the 2019 African Beach Games =

- Flag of Tunisia
- IOC code: TUN

in Sal, Cape Verde 14 June 2019 – 23 June 2019
- Medals Ranked 3rd: Gold 3 Silver 3 Bronze 1 Total 7

African Beach Games appearances
- 2019; 2023

Tunisia competed at the inaugural African Beach Games in Sal, Cape Verde from 14 to 23 June 2019. In total, athletes representing Tunisia won three gold medals, three silver medals and one bronze medal. The country finished in 3rd place in the medal table.

== Medal summary ==
Medals by sport
Sport	1st place, gold medalist(s)	2nd place, silver medalist(s)	3rd place, bronze medalist(s)	Total
Beach handball	2	0	0	2
Coastal rowing	1	1	1	3
Open water swimming	0	2	0	2

=== Medalists ===
Medal	Name	Sport	Event
Gold	Men's team	Beach handball	Men's tournament
Gold	Women's team	Beach handball	Women's tournament
Gold	Sarra Zammali	Coastal rowing	Women's singles
Silver	Mohamed Mansouri	Coastal rowing	Men's singles
Silver	Haithem Mbarki	Open water swimming	Men's 5 km
Silver	Alya Gara	Open water swimming	Women's 5 km
Bronze	Mohamed Mansouri; Sarra Zammali	Coastal rowing	Mixed team
