= Karate at the 2018 Mediterranean Games =

Karate competition

- Venue: Cambrils Pavilion
- Dates: 23–24 June
- Competitors: 126 from 21 nations

The karate competitions at the 2018 Mediterranean Games took place on 23 and 24 June at the Cambrils Pavilion in Cambrils.

Athletes competed in 10 weight categories.

== Medal table ==
* Host nation (Spain)

Rank	Nation	Gold	Silver	Bronze	Total
1	Turkey	2	2	3	7
2	France	2	1	1	4
3	Italy	1	1	3	5
4	Morocco	1	1	0	2
5	Macedonia	1	0	2	3
6	Algeria	1	0	1	2
6	Serbia	1	0	1	2
6	Slovenia	1	0	1	2
9	Egypt	0	2	3	5
10	Croatia	0	1	0	1
10	Greece	0	1	0	1
10	Tunisia	0	1	0	1
13	Spain*	0	0	3	3
14	Montenegro	0	0	1	1
Totals (14 entries)		10	10	19	39

== Medalists ==
=== Men ===
Event	Gold	Silver	Bronze
Kumite 60 kg	Abdessalam Ameknassi; Morocco	Nader Azzoauzi; Tunisia	Eray Şamdan; Turkey
Kumite 60 kg	Abdessalam Ameknassi; Morocco	Nader Azzoauzi; Tunisia	Malek Salama; Egypt
Kumite 67 kg	Marvin Garin; France	Burak Uygur; Turkey	Samy Ennkhaili; Spain
Kumite 67 kg	Marvin Garin; France	Burak Uygur; Turkey	Nenad Kelebikj; Macedonia
Kumite 75 kg	Erman Eltemur; Turkey	Enes Garibović; Croatia	Oualid Bouabaoub; Algeria
Kumite 75 kg	Erman Eltemur; Turkey	Enes Garibović; Croatia	Rabii Jendoubi; Italy
Kumite 84 kg	Berat Jakupi; Macedonia	Jessie Da Costa; France	Ahmed Elmasry; Egypt
Kumite 84 kg	Berat Jakupi; Macedonia	Jessie Da Costa; France	Michele Martina; Italy
Kumite +84 kg	Hocine Daikhi; Algeria	Ahmed Elasfar; Egypt	Slobodan Bitević; Serbia
Kumite +84 kg	Hocine Daikhi; Algeria	Ahmed Elasfar; Egypt	Zharko Arsovski; Macedonia

=== Women ===
Event	Gold	Silver	Bronze
Kumite 50 kg	Jelena Milivojčević; Serbia	Aicha Sayah; Morocco	Areeg Rashed; Egypt
Kumite 50 kg	Jelena Milivojčević; Serbia	Aicha Sayah; Morocco	Serap Özçelik; Turkey
Kumite 55 kg^{[a]}	Tuba Yakan; Turkey	Sara Cardin; Italy	Sabrina Ouihaddadene; France
Kumite 61 kg	Tjaša Ristić; Slovenia	Giana Lotfy; Egypt	Viola Lallo; Italy
Kumite 61 kg	Tjaša Ristić; Slovenia	Giana Lotfy; Egypt	Cristina Ferrer; Spain
Kumite 68 kg	Silvia Semeraro; Italy	Eda Eltemur; Turkey	Marina Raković; Montenegro
Kumite 68 kg	Silvia Semeraro; Italy	Eda Eltemur; Turkey	Lina Pušnik; Slovenia
Kumite +68 kg	Nancy Garcia; France	Eleni Chatziliadou; Greece	Laura Palacio; Spain
Kumite +68 kg	Nancy Garcia; France	Eleni Chatziliadou; Greece	Meltem Hocaoğlu; Turkey

- ^{Women's 55 kg} Ana Drašković of Montenegro originally won the silver medal, but was disqualified for doping violations.
