= Ivory Coast at the 2019 African Beach Games =

- Flag of Ivory Coast
- IOC code: CIV

in Sal, Cape Verde 14 June 2019 – 23 June 2019
- Medals Ranked 16th: Gold 0 Silver 0 Bronze 3 Total 3

African Beach Games appearances
- 2019; 2023

Ivory Coast competed at the inaugural African Beach Games in Sal, Cape Verde from 14 to 23 June 2019. In total, athletes representing Ivory Coast won three bronze medals and the country finished in 16th place in the medal table.

== Medal summary ==
Medals by sport
Sport	1st place, gold medalist(s)	2nd place, silver medalist(s)	3rd place, bronze medalist(s)	Total
3×3 basketball	0	0	2	2
Karate	0	0	1	1

=== Medalists ===
Medal	Name	Sport	Event
Bronze	Aboubakar Traoré; Ibrahim Sevede; Adjo Bokobri; Cheick Traoré	3×3 basketball	Men's team
Bronze	Aboubakar Traoré	3×3 basketball	Men's dunk contest
Bronze	Songuida Sanogo	Karate	Men's individual kata
