= 2023 African Beach Games =

Multi-sport event in Hammamet, Tunisia

II African Beach Games
- Host city: Hammamet, Tunisia
- Nations: 53
- Athletes: 1.100
- Events: 59 events in 16 sports
- Opening: 24 June 2023
- Closing: 30 June 2023
- Website: JAPhammamet2023

The 2023 African Beach Games is the 2nd edition of the international beach sports competition between the nations of Africa, organised by the Association of National Olympic Committees of Africa (ANOCA).

The games were held in Hammamet, Tunisia in June 2023.

== Participating nations ==
A total of 1100 athletes from 53 nations competed in 30 events across 16 sports.

== Sports ==
2023 African Beach Games Sports Programme
- Athletics (3)
- 3x3 basketball (2)
- Badminton (4)
- Beach handball (2)
- Beach soccer (1)
- Beach tennis (3)
- Beach volleyball (2)
- Beach wrestling (8)
- Karate (4)
- Kayak (2)
- Open water swimming (2)
- Rowing (5)
- Teqball (3)
- Wushu (18)
Demonstration sports
- Fencing
- Standup paddleboarding (2)

== Calendar ==
June 2023	June									Events
June 2023	22 Thu	23 Fri	24 Sat	25 Sun	26 Mon	27 Tue	28 Wed	29 Thu	30 Fri	Events
Ceremonies	GA	OC							CC	
Beach handball			●	●	2					2
Beach soccer						●	●	●	1	1
Beach volleyball		●	●	●	●	2				2
Beach tennis							●	●	3	3
3x3 basketball							●	●	2	2
Coastal rowing			●	●	3					5
Coastal rowing			●	2	3					5
Open water swimming						2				2
Kayak								●	2	2
Karate			●	4						4
Wushu					●	18				18
Beach wrestling							●	8		8
Badminton						●	●	●	4	4
Teqball			●	●	3					3
Athletics						3				3
Paddle									Demo	
Fencing					Demo					

== Medal table ==
* Host nation (Tunisia)

Rank	NOC	Gold	Silver	Bronze	Total
1	Algeria (ALG)	15	7	13	35
2	Tunisia (TUN)*	13	13	14	40
3	Morocco (MAR)	8	10	4	22
4	Nigeria (NGR)	6	3	2	11
5	Senegal (SEN)	5	4	6	15
6	South Africa (RSA)	4	6	7	17
7	Djibouti (DJI)	2	0	2	4
8	Mauritius (MRI)	1	1	2	4
9	Mali (MLI)	1	1	1	3
10	Ethiopia (ETH)	1	0	1	2
10	Namibia (NAM)	1	0	1	2
12	Cameroon (CMR)	1	0	0	1
12	The Gambia (GAM)	1	0	0	1
14	Kenya (KEN)	0	3	0	3
14	Lesotho (LES)	0	3	0	3
16	Benin (BEN)	0	2	2	4
17	Libya (LBA)	0	1	2	3
18	Guinea-Bissau (GBS)	0	1	0	1
18	Ivory Coast (CIV)	0	1	0	1
18	Madagascar (MAD)	0	1	0	1
18	Mozambique (MOZ)	0	1	0	1
22	Zambia (ZAM)	0	0	2	2
23	Rwanda (RWA)	0	0	1	1
23	Tanzania (TAN)	0	0	1	1
Totals (24 entries)		59	58	61	178

Source: ANOCA

== Results ==
https://fr.wikipedia.org/wiki/Jeux_africains_de_plage_de_2023

=== Beach Soccer ===
https://roonbasports.com/beachsoccer/men/2023.html

https://roonbasports.com/beachsoccer/women/2023.html

The men's tournament was won by the Morocco national beach soccer team, which defeated the Senegal team. Tanzania finished third.

The women's tournament was set to feature only two teams: Kenya and Cape Verde. However, with the Kenyan team already on-site, Cape Verde withdrew, leading to the cancellation of the competition and the direct qualification of Kenya for the World Beach Games.
