= Chaskele =

Ghanaian game similar to cricket

Chaskele is a local bat-and-ball game played between two teams of two players. It is a Ghanaian game played by children and it is similar to cricket. The ball is made with a crushed tin can and a stick is used as a bat.

== How to Play ==
Chaskele is played with crushed cans, stick, car tyre or bucket. A minimum of two players can start the game, one begins as the defender and the other, the scorer. The defender is to make sure the opponent does not throw the ball into the bucket or car tyre to win.
