= Jelena Milivojčević =

Serbian karateka (born 1990)

Personal information
- Nationality: Serbian
- Born: 2 September 1990 (age 35)
- Height: 167 cm (5 ft 6 in)
- Weight: 54 kg (119 lb)

Sport
- Country: Serbia
- Sport: Karate
- Weight class: 50 kg
- Event: Kumite
Medal record
Women's karate
Representing Serbia
Mediterranean Games
Gold medal – first place	2018 Tarragona	Kumite 50 kg
European Championships
Bronze medal – third place	2016 Montpellier	Kumite 50 kg
Bronze medal – third place	2019 Guadalajara	Kumite 50 kg

Jelena Milivojčević (Serbian Cyrillic: Јелена Миливојчевић; born 2 September 1990) is a Serbian karateka. She is a gold medalist at the Mediterranean Games and a two-time bronze medalist at the European Karate Championships.

In 2018, Milivojčević won the gold medal in the women's kumite 50 kg event at the Mediterranean Games held in Tarragona, Spain. In 2019, she won one of the bronze medals in the women's kumite 50 kg event at the European Karate Championships held in Guadalajara, Spain.

In 2021, Milivojčević competed at the World Olympic Qualification Tournament held in Paris, France hoping to qualify for the 2020 Summer Olympics in Tokyo, Japan.
