= Esther Toko =

Nigerian rower (born 2000)

Personal information
- Native name: Esther Tamaraebi Toko
- National team: Nigeria
- Born: 28 March 2000 (age 25)

Sport
- Sport: Rowing

Esther Tamaraebi Toko (born 28 March 2000) is a Nigerian rower. She won bronze and silver medals at the 2019 African Beach Games and she also qualified to row single sculls at the 2020 Summer Olympics.

== Career ==
Toko competed in the 2015 World Rowing Championships and the 2019 African Games. At the latter event, she competed in four events. She then won a bronze and a silver medal at the African Beach Games in Cape Verde in 2019.

Toko was then selected to be the first home-based rower to represent Nigeria at the 2020 Summer Olympics. She qualified to compete in the single sculls after coming third in the B-final at the 2019 FISA African Olympic Qualification Regatta in Tunisia. As of February 2020, she was one of thirteen Nigerian athletes who had qualified for the Olympics in Tokyo in eleven different sports.

Toko trains at the National Institute for Sports in Lagos.
