= Mike Moses =

American aerospace engineer and aerospace industry executive

Michael P. Moses is an American aerospace engineer and aerospace industry executive. He was the Space Shuttle program Launch Integration Manager from 2008 until the conclusion of the program in 2011. Moses joined Virgin Galactic in 2011 as vice president of operations and was named president in 2016.

Moses got his Bachelor of Science in physics from Purdue University in 1989, an MS in space sciences from Florida Institute of Technology in 1991, and an MS in aerospace engineering from Purdue University School of Aeronautics and Astronautics in 1995. He is married to Beth Moses.
