= Amina Haleyi =

Algerian footballer (born 1992)

Personal information
- Date of birth: 10 September 1992 (age 34)
- Position: Goalkeeper

Team information
- Current team: Alger Centre

Senior career*
Years	Team	Apps	(Gls)
- Alger Centre

International career
- Algeria
- * Club domestic league appearances and goals

Amina Haleyi (Arabic: حاليي أمينة; born 10 September 1992) is an Algerian footballer who plays as a goalkeeper for ASE Alger Centre and the Algeria women's national team.

== Club career ==
Haleyi has played for Alger Centre in Algeria.

== International career ==
Haleyi capped for Algeria at senior level during the 2021 Arab Women's Cup.
