= Morocco at the 2019 African Beach Games =

- Flag of Morocco
- IOC code: MAR

in Sal, Cape Verde 14 June 2019 – 23 June 2019
- Medals Ranked 1st: Gold 9 Silver 3 Bronze 4 Total 16

African Beach Games appearances
- 2019; 2023

Morocco competed at the inaugural African Beach Games in Sal, Cape Verde from 14 to 23 June 2019. In total, athletes representing Morocco won nine gold medals, three silver medals and four bronze medals. The country finished in 1st place in the medal table.

== Medal summary ==
Medals by sport
Sport	1st place, gold medalist(s)	2nd place, silver medalist(s)	3rd place, bronze medalist(s)	Total
Beach handball	0	0	1	1
Beach soccer	0	1	0	1
Beach tennis	3	1	0	4
Beach volleyball	1	0	1	2
Football freestyle	1	0	1	2
Katate	3	0	0	3
Kitesurfing	0	1	0	1
Open water swimming	1	0	1	2
