= Amina Rouba =

Algerian rower (born 1986)

Personal information
- Born: 9 January 1986 (age 40) Bethioua, Algeria

Sport
- Country: Algeria
- Sport: Rowing

Amina Rouba (Arabic: امينة روبة, born 9 January 1986) is an Algerian rower. She competed in the single sculls race at the 2012 Summer Olympics and placed 2nd in Final E and 26th overall. She also competed in the Rowing at the 2016 Summer Olympics – Women's single sculls and placed 3rd in Final D and 21st overall.
