= Ghana Karate Do Association =

Governing body for karate in Ghana

- Sport: Karate
- Jurisdiction: National
- Abbreviation: (GKF)
- Founded: 30 April 1997
- Affiliation: World Karate Federation (WKF)
- Regional affiliation: Union of African Karate Federation
- (Ghana)

Ghana Karate Do Association it is the largest association for karate in Ghana and a member as well as the official representative for this sport in the Ghana Olympic Committee. It was founded in 1997.

== History ==
Karate was first introduced in Ghana in the early 1990s. Until the late 1990s, karate training in Ghana was more of a traditional martial art than a sport. Karate prospered because of the immense contribution of practitioners and mentors such as Sensei Daniel Djura, founder of Africa Goju; Sensei Donald Djura; Sensei Moses Baiden; Sensei Duke Banson; and Sensei Quagrine.

On 30 April 1997, a national body was registered and inaugurated with the National Sports Council (NSC) in the name of Ghana Karate-Do Federation (GKF) as the 26th sporting association. The GKF was affiliated to the Union of African Karate Federation (UFAK) and eventually to the World Karate Federation (WKF).

The founding members were Melvin Brown, Francis Fuster, Benjamin Selormey, Victor Amara, Daniel Gyamfi and Samuel Akpalu. After the inauguration of the federation, there was the need to form an executive and a technical committee. The executive committee was chaired by Rtd. Captain George Mould, and FrancisFuster and Jude Adu-Amankwah were his vice. All the other members were karatekas and served on the technical committee with Benjamin Selormey as Technical Director.

The Ghana Karate-Do Federation later came to be recognized as Ghana Karate-Do Association.

In 2004 Jude Adu-Amankwah took over from Capt. Mould as president of the association, with Sensei Melvin Brown as Technical Director, and Sensei Kwabena A. Poku as Referee and vice to the Technical Director. The other members of the technical committee were Sensei Prince Wilson, Sensei George-Slater Commodore, Sensei Saadisu Mamah Idrissu, Sensei Frank Danso Bekoe and Sensei Sylvester Davies. The technical committee is in charge of coaching and general training and grading of karatekas at the national level.

The membership of the executive committee was changed in 2009, with Michael Nunoo as the Chairman of the association and Sensei Saadisu Idrissu as the Technical Director. The present composition of the Management Board as of May 2011 is Michael Nunoo, Chairman; Ade Sawyer, Vice-Chairman; Patrick Anyidoho-Cofie, General Secretary; Nathaniel Nartey, member; Sensei Kwabena Poku, Head Coach; Sensei Frank Danso Bekoe, Deputy Coach; and Dr. Sulley, member. The executive committee is now referred to as the management board.

The present members of the technical committee are Sensei Kwabena A. Poku, Head Coach; Sensei Prince Wilson; Sensei Frank Danso Bekoe, Deputy Coach; Sensei Isaac Amponsah; Sensei Ibrahim Jarrah; Victor Lartey; and Emmanuel Adjei.

The GKA took its first outing the year it was inaugurated, in 1997, to the UFAK Zone 3 Championships in the Ivory Coast, and won two gold, four silver and two bronze medals. Since then the association has participated in many yearly UFAK Zone 3 Championships and has performed increasingly well, winning laurels in both Kumite and Kata. The Association has also represented Ghana in three All Africa Games since its inauguration: in 1997, 2003 and 2007, when contestant Victor Lartey won by correction of a previous decision.

== International competition ==
Ghana Karate Do Association is a member of the African umbrella organization Union of African Karate Federation (UAKF) as well as the World Association for World Karate Federation (WKF).

On the part of the Ghana Olympic Committee, the Ghana Karate Association is the only Karate Association authorized to send athletes to the Olympic Games.
