= African Beach Games =

Multi-sport event in Africa

- Abbreviation: ABG
- Purpose: Beach sports event for nations on the African continent
- Frequency: Every four years
- Inaugurated: 2019 in Sal, Cape Verde
- Most recent: 2023 in Hammamet, Tunisia

The African Beach Games is a continental multi-sport event held among athletes from Africa. The Games are organised under the governance of the Association of National Olympic Committees of Africa (ANOCA). The Games were announced by the ANOCA President, Lassana Palenfo, in May 2015.

All of the competing nations are for the African continent.

== History ==
The first Games were held on the island of Sal, Cape Verde in June 2019. In October 2021, Baseball5 was added as a full medal sport for the 2023 edition.

The second Gamed were held in city of Hammamet, Tunisia.

== Editions ==
Host cities of the African Beach Games

Edition	Year	Host city	Host nation	Start date	End date	Nations	Sports	Events	Top nation
1	2019	Sal	Cape Verde	14 June	23 June	45	11	28	Morocco (MAR)
2	2023	Hammamet	Tunisia	23 June	30 June	45	12	59	Algeria (ALG)
3	2027	Riaba	Equatorial Guinea	Future event					

== Medals (2019-2023) ==
Medals Table
Rank	NOC	Gold	Silver	Bronze	Total
1	Algeria (ALG)	20	13	17	50
2	Morocco (MAR)	17	13	8	38
3	Tunisia (TUN)	16	16	15	47
4	Nigeria (NGR)	7	5	6	18
5	Senegal (SEN)	6	4	6	16
6	South Africa (RSA)	4	6	7	17
7	Mauritius (MRI)	3	3	2	8
8	Cape Verde (CPV)	3	2	5	10
9	Mali (MLI)	3	2	2	7
10	Djibouti (DJI)	2	0	3	5
11	Namibia (NAM)	1	4	1	6
12	Mozambique (MOZ)	1	1	0	2
13	Ethiopia (ETH)	1	0	1	2
13	Uganda (UGA)	1	0	1	2
15	Cameroon (CMR)	1	0	0	1
15	Gambia (GAM)	1	0	0	1
17	Kenya (KEN)	0	4	3	7
18	Lesotho (LES)	0	3	0	3
19	Benin (BEN)	0	2	2	4
20	Togo (TOG)	0	2	0	2
21	Botswana (BOT)	0	1	3	4
21	Ivory Coast (CIV)	0	1	3	4
21	Libya (LBA)	0	1	3	4
24	Ghana (GHA)	0	1	0	1
24	Guinea-Bissau (GBS)	0	1	0	1
24	Madagascar (MAD)	0	1	0	1
27	Zambia (ZAM)	0	0	2	2
28	Burundi (BDI)	0	0	1	1
28	Rwanda (RWA)	0	0	1	1
28	Tanzania (TAN)	0	0	1	1
Totals (30 entries)		87	86	93	266

== See also ==
- Asian Beach Games
