= 1917 in Iran =

- Decades
- See also: Other events of 1917; Years in Iran

The following lists events that happened during 1917 in Qajar era.

== Incumbents ==
- Monarch: Ahmad Shah Qajar
- Prime Minister: Vosugh od-Dowleh (until June 5), Mohammad-Ali Ala ol-Saltaneh (June 5 – November 21), Abdol Majid Mirza (starting November 21)

== Births ==
- February 8 – Ehsan Tabari, Iranian philosopher, poet, literary figure.
- February 10 – Hossein Fatemi, Iranian politician.
- March 16 – Mehrdad Pahlbod, Iranian politician.
- March 20 – Anvar Khamei, Iranian economist, journalist and translator.
- April 1 – Heshmat Sanjari, Iranian conductor and composer.
- June 24 – Ahmad Sayyed Javadi, Iranian lawyer, political activist and politician.
- October 6 – Fereydoon Motamed, linguists.
- October 28 – Shams Pahlavi, elder sister of the last Shah of Iran.
- October 31 – Mehri Mehrnia, Iranian actress.
- ? – Akbar Schandermani, Iranian politician.
- ? – Amir Nosrat'ollah Balakhanlou, Iranian politician.
- ? – Effat Tejaratchi, first Iranian female aviator.
- ? – Esmail Koushan, Persian film director.
- ? – Habibollah Hedayat, Iranian nutritonist.
- ? – Hasan Ali Nejabat Shirazi, Iranian ayatollah.
- ? – Hossein Fardoust, Iranian politician.
- ? – Khosrow Qashqai, Iranian politician.
- ? – Mahlagha Mallah, Iranian environmentalist.
- ? – Mahmoud Melmasi – Azarm, Iranian writer.
- ? – Mahmoud Sakhaie, Iranian military personnel.
- ? – Manucher Mirza Farman Farmaian, sixth son of Prince Abdol Hossein Mirza Farmanfarma and of Batoul Khanoum.
- ? – Shami Kermashani, Kurdish poet.

== Deaths ==
- February 21 – Adib al-Mamalek Farahani, Iranian poet, writer and journalist.
- ? – Ali-Qoli Khan Bakhtiari, Iranian revolutionary.
