= 1860 in Iran =

- Decades
- See also: Other events of 1860; Years in Iran

The following lists events that happened during 1860 in Qajar era.

== Incumbents ==
- Monarch: Naser al-Din Shah Qajar

== Births ==
- August 2 – Adib al-Mamalek Farahani, Iranian poet, writer and journalist.
- ? – Abu l-Hasan al-Isfahani, Iranian religious leader.
- ? – Edeb, Kurdish poet.

== Deaths ==
- ? – Esmail Jalayer, Iranian painter and calligrapher.
- ? – Jeyran (wife of Naser al-Din Shah), mistress of Nasser al-Din Shah Qajar.
