= Murder of Abdulrahman Nafisi and his family =

Iranian Bank Manager (1948–1990)

Abdulrahman Nafisi
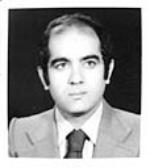

Personal details
- Born: 26 June 1948
- Died: 11 February 1990 (aged 41) Hamedan, Iran
- Cause of death: Murder
- Resting place: Bagh-e-Behesht, Dezful
- Spouse: Fatemeh Taherian
- Children: Bita, Peyman, Iman

Murder at Hamedan's Bank Keshavarzi Iran occurred on 11 February 1990 in the basement of the central branch of Bank Keshavarzi Iran in Hamedan, located close to Avicenna Mausoleum which is called Meydan-e-Aramgah (Persian: میدان آرامگاه). In this incident, the bank manager, his wife and two children, and the bank guard were killed during the robbery. With the extensive efforts of the officers, three robbers, one of whom was a dismissed employee of the same bank, were arrested and confessed to the crime. An extraordinary court was formed for this case and a verdict was issued based on Iran's law. The convicts were executed only four days after the crime. According to the prosecutor, this crime, in terms of the depth of the tragedy, the speed of the investigation, and the punishment, was considered rare or unprecedented in the History of the judicial system of Iran until that time.

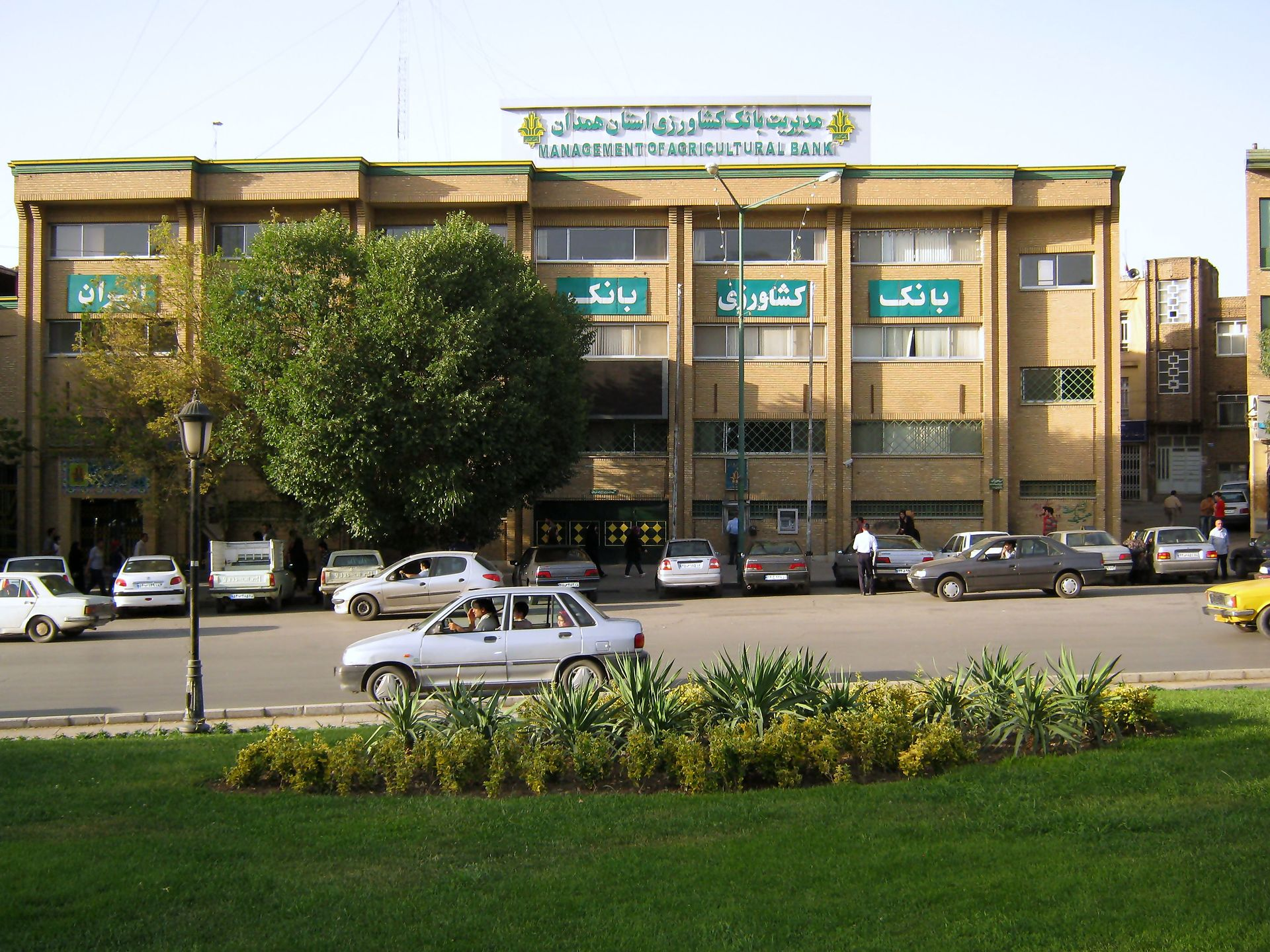
The incident occurred at the Central branch of Bank Keshavarzi Iran in Hamedan

== Incident ==
In the early hours of 11 February 1990, three individuals broke into the central branch of Bank Keshavarzi Iran in Hamedan with the intention of robbing it. They initially bound the unarmed bank guard with a rope before proceeding to the bank manager's residence on the second floor. Around 2:30 AM, they removed the door hinges and entered, confronting Nafisi and his wife, who had been awakened by the noise. The manager's two children were also roused and captured by the masked robbers.

After stabbing Nafisi and searching the apartment, the assailants discovered the bank vault key. They then took Nafisi and his family to the basement. Following two to three hours of torture and threats, Nafisi was compelled to open the first vault door using its combination and the key. He hoped the second door would deter the robbers as the second key was kept with another bank official at a different location. Realizing the criminals possessed an iron saw and were determined to access the vault, Nafisi pleaded with them to take only his personal belongings instead of the people's money. Unsuccessful in persuading them, he identified the main robber by name, having recognized him during the ordeal. Nafisi warned the robber that the money would not bring him peace. However, when the robbers gained access to the safe and sent one of their members inside to scatter the money, they began killing everyone present. Nafisi, his wife Fatemeh Taherian, their two sons Peyman (12) and Iman (4), and the guard Hossein Shokri were murdered. The eldest child, Bita (16), was staying with relatives on the night of the incident.

The public prosecutor of Hamedan, Ahmad Bashirieh, said:

Upon learning of this horrific crime, I immediately went to the crime scene. Given the scale of the crime, the number of victims, and the theft of a large sum of money from the bank vault, an emergency meeting was convened. Security officials and the investigating officer were present, all deeply affected. We vowed to pursue the criminals until they were apprehended. The governor and other authorities offered their support. An expert team from Tehran was dispatched. Our efforts were successful, and the criminals, one of whom had fled south, were arrested. The stolen money was recovered. The brutality of the crime caused widespread fear, particularly among students. The incident was covered extensively by domestic and foreign media.

== Victims ==
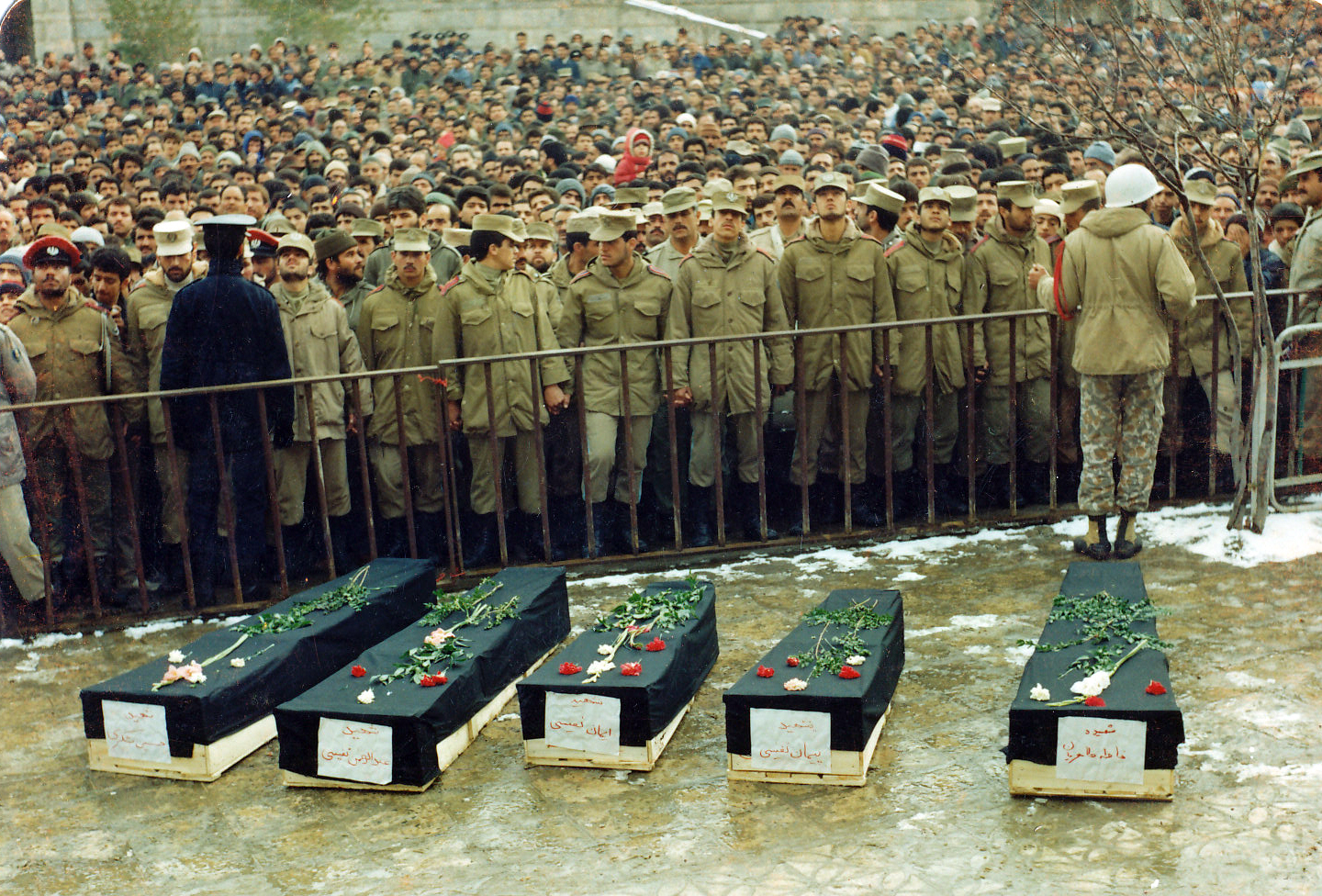
Coffins of the bank manager, his wife, their two children, and the bank guard

Abdulrahman Nafisi was hired in 1971 at the Agricultural Bank branch in Dezful and transferred in 1987 to Hamedan as the manager of the central branch, along with his wife and three children. Fatemeh Taherian, a 35-year-old teacher, and their two children, Peyman, a 12-year-old student, and Iman, 4 years old, were killed. The bank guard Hossein Shokri, a war veteran of the Iran–Iraq War, who had lost an eye, was married and had one newborn child.

== Punishment of the murderers ==
Due to widespread public outrage over these horrific murders and the concerted efforts of inspectors and cooperating institutions, the murderers were apprehended within days. They subsequently confessed to the robbery and murders in court. The judge sentenced them to flogging and execution. The names of the murderers, two of whom were brothers, are as follows:

1. Hossein Golzar, 27, a fired employee of Bank Keshavarzi Iran
2. Hassan Golzar, 28, a fired employee of Hamedan Municipality
3. Reza, 23, a labourer at the market

Their sentences were carried out on 15 February near the crime scene. The people of Hamedan widely welcomed the execution of the criminals.

== Honors and commemorations ==
Years after the tragic murder of Nafisi and his family, both he and his wife were officially recognized as martyrs by Foundation of Martyrs and Veterans Affairs. An alley adjacent to the bank has been named in Nafisi's honor, and a monument stands in front of the central branch of Bank Keshavarzi Iran in Hamadan, symbolizing his courage and dedication as the bank manager and protector of the treasury. Additionally, a novel titled "Bita," written by Nafisi's son-in-law, documents the events surrounding their deaths. This work has inspired many social media activists to share the story, leading to the publication of numerous articles. In recent years, a coalition of NGOs has held annual commemorations of this event in Hamadan.
