= Jamshid Barzegar =

Persian poet

- جمشید برزگر
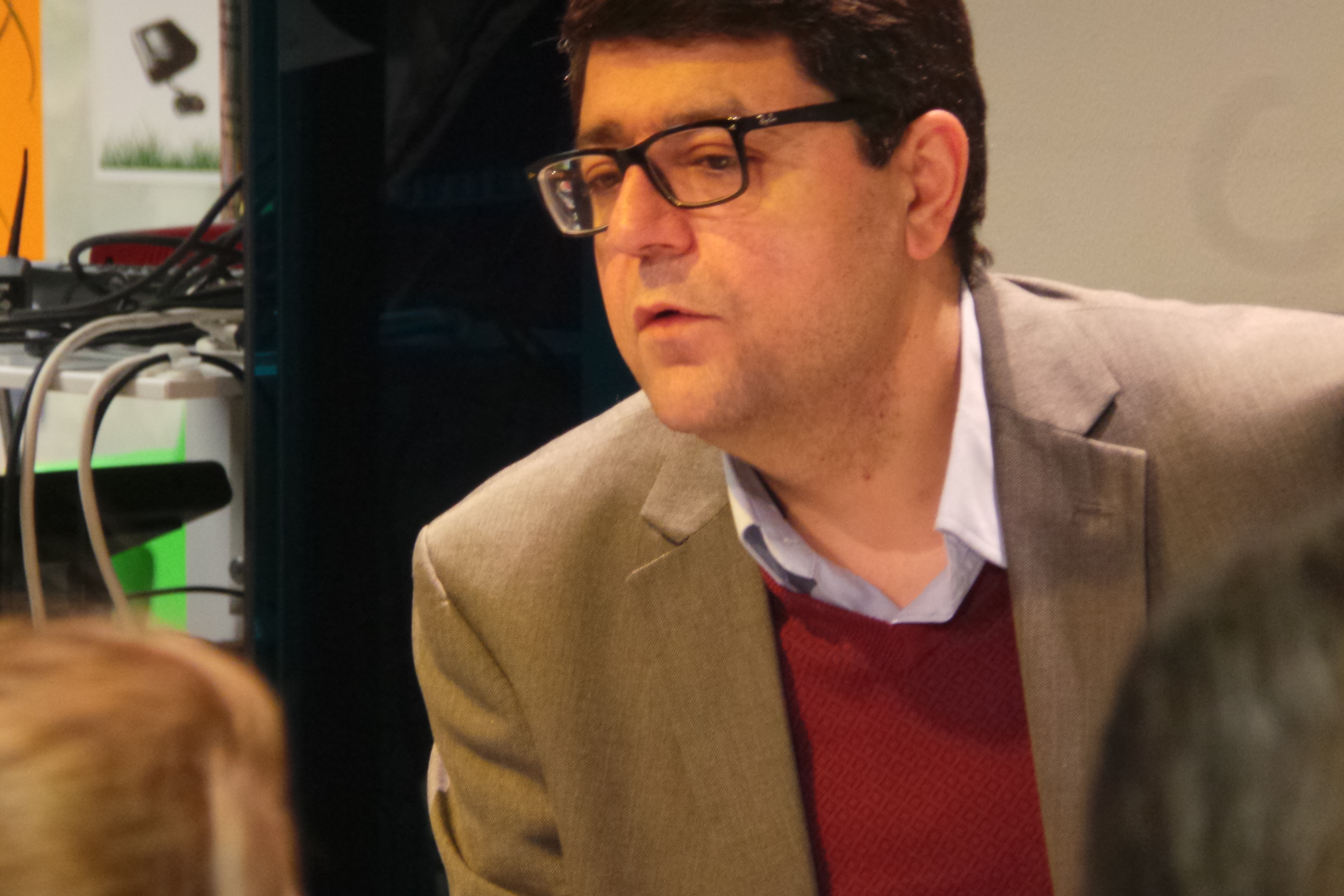
- Born: 20 August 1971 (age 54); Hamedan, Iran
- Citizenship: Austria
- Education: Doctorate in Political Science
- Known for: Journalist; Political Analyst
- Notable work: Running under the sun I robbed myself all the time Like the bird, forget your nest Suspended Papers
- Relatives: Mijid Barzegar

Jamshid Barzegar (Persian: جمشید برزگر ), born 20 August 1971 in Hamedan, Iran, is an Iranian poet and writer. He began his job as a journalist in 1991, issued his first book in 1994, and was the editor of the newspaper Hambastegi "Solidarity". It was the last news activity he did in Iran. He published four books on poetry, and published dozens of novels in the field of literary criticism and hundreds of articles in the field of literature and political analysis. He also authored seven documentaries that touched on the life and works of contemporary poets and writers in Iran. He is also the brother of the famous Iranian director and producer, Majid Barzegar. Since January 2018, Barzegar has been head of the Deutsche Welle Persian Service.

== Educational background ==
He graduated in 1990 from the University of Tehran College of Law and Political Science in political science. He obtained his master's degree in 1994 with honors and presented his thesis in the master's title "The non-transformation of politics into a social phenomenon and the emergence of organized armed mobility in Iran" dealing with guerrilla warfare. He received his doctorate in political science in 1992 from the University of Vienna.

== Journalism career ==
From 1991 to 2001, he worked as an editor and journalist for a number of newspapers, and he was also the editor-in-chief of some newspapers and publishing houses. Among the most notable are the Iran newspaper, Gozareshe Rose, Entekhab, Hambastegi, Takapou, Meyar and Karnameh. Since leaving Iran in 2001, he has worked as a political analyst for Iranian affairs and started collaborating with BBC Persian. In 2006 he worked as the editor-in-chief of Radio Farda and he launched Radio Farda's website and formed its editorial team, in the Czech capital Prague, and this Persian-speaking radio follows the United States-funded Radio Free Europe/Radio Liberty. In 2008 he returned to London and became the head of the BBC Persian website and radio for the next five years. and since 2014 he has worked as the BBC's senior analyst for Iranian affairs, Persian editor and as a strand editor. During early 2018 Jamshid Barzegar left his longstanding post at The BBC to take up the role of head of the Deutsche Welle Persian Service. (2018 – 2020).In recent years, he has dedicated himself to publishing hundreds of articles and political analyses.

== Literature ==
Jamshid Barzegar began his works of literature at an early age. His first books were published in 1994 in Tehran. In addition to authorship, Barzegar was active in the field of criticism in the form literature, In 1998 he was elected as General Secretary of the Iranian Writers Association . During his career, Barzegar made eight documentaries, and also conducted lengthy interviews with Simin Behbahani, Mahmoud Dowlatabadi, Siavash Kasrai, Mohammad-Ali Sepanlou, Esmail Khoi, Javad Mojabi and Shams Langeroodi.

His most famous works are:

- Running under the sun (Persian: در آفتاب دویدن)
- I robbed myself all the time (Persian: هر عمر راه بر خود بریدم), 1997, Tehran
- Like the bird, you will forget your nest (Persian: مثل پرنده درخت را فراموش می‌کنی)
- Suspended Papers (Persian: روزنامهٔ تعطیل ), 2017, London. (In 2000, the Iranian authorities did not permit the publication of this book, which led to his departure from his home country.)
