= Bank Keshavarzi Iran =

Iranian banking establishment

Bank Keshavarzi
- Company type: State-owned enterprise
- Industry: Banking, Financial services
- Founded: 1933; 93 years ago
- Headquarters: Tehran, Iran
- Area served: Iran
- Key people: Vahab Mottaghinia, CEO
- Products: Finance and insurance Consumer Banking; Corporate Banking; Investment Banking; Investment Management; Global Wealth Management; Private Equity; Mortgages; Credit Cards
- Revenue: ▲US$2.91 billion (2016)
- Net income: ▲US$1.3 million (2007)
- Total assets: $18.29 million dollars (2007)
- Number of employees: 16,115 (full-time)
- Website: http://www.bki.ir/en

Bank Keshavarzi (Persian: بانکِ کشاورزی, Bānk-e-Keshāvarzi), (meaning: Bank of Agriculture) also known as Agribank, is a major Iranian banking establishment offering retail and commercial services. The company was established in 1933 and as a Farming and Industrial Bank. Currently, the bank serves as the only specialized financial institution in the agricultural sector that holds over 1800 branches nationwide and finances nearly 70% of the Iranian agricultural sector.

While established in Tehran, the bank operates throughout the nation with over 16,000 employees and 1800 branches. The bank currently specializes in providing credit facilities for agricultural development and other rural development activities.

== Operations ==
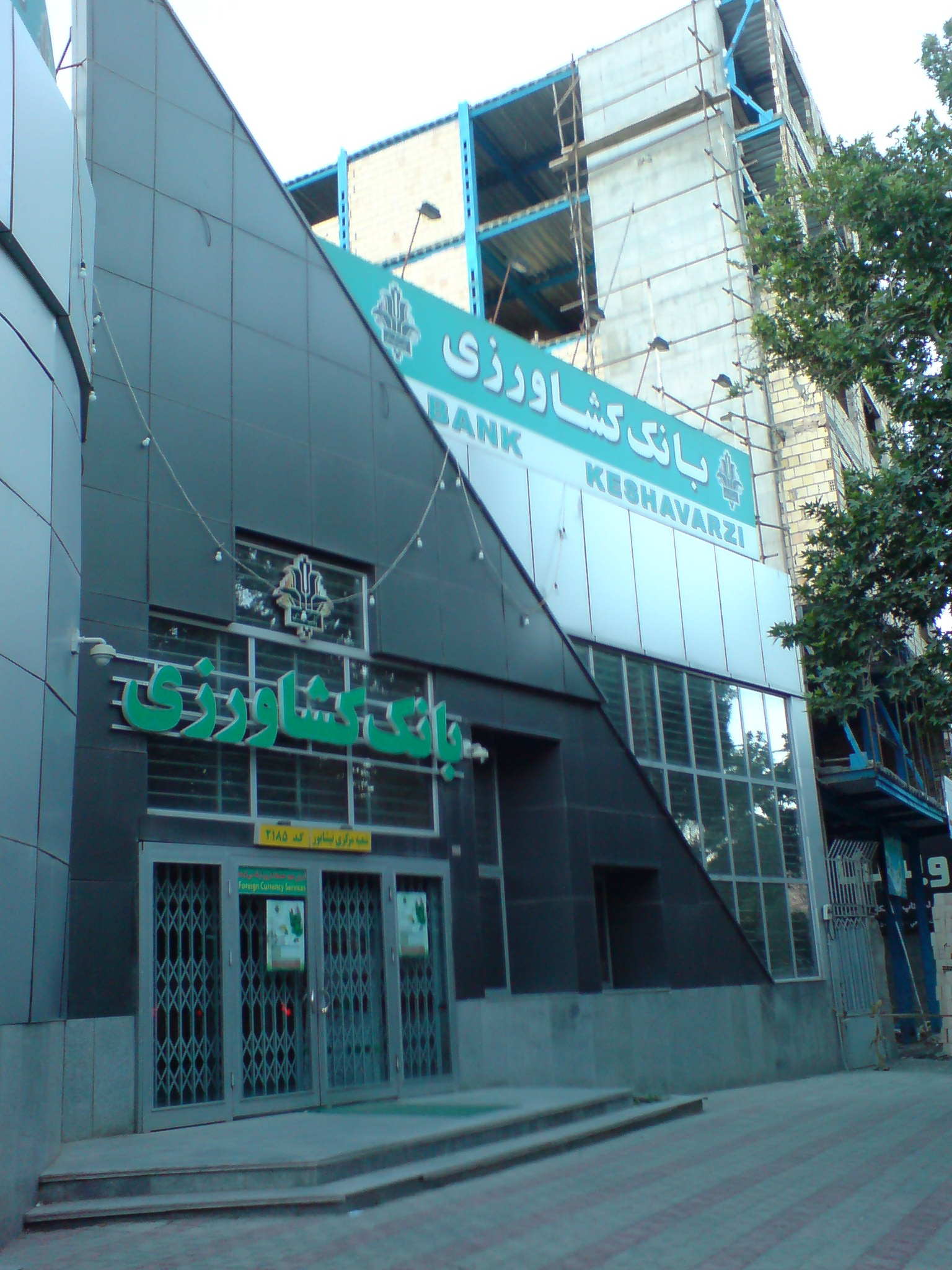
Central branch of Keshavarzi bank in Nishapur

The bank currently operates throughout the country, housing a total of 1800 branches. In addition to offering short and fixed deposit accounts for domestic and overseas clients, the bank provides letters of credit, treasury, currency exchange, corporate loans syndication, financial advisory and electronic banking services.

In 2003 a pilot branch was exclusively designed in Tehran to service teens exclusively. Currently, there are 85 branches across Tehran holding special windows for services offered to children and young people. Similar windows have recently been opened in provincial directorates.

In 2009, the bank was awarded the Association of Development Financing Institutions of Asia and the Pacific's award for agricultural and environmental development.

== Significant Incident ==
In February 1990, the bank's central branch in Hamedan experienced a tragic robbery. The event resulted in the loss of life of the bank manager Abdulrahman Nafisi, his family, and a security guard. The bank manager, Abdulrahman Nafisi, displayed extraordinary courage by prioritizing the safety of the bank's funds over his own life. Despite being under torture, he pleaded with the robbers to take his personal belongings instead of the people's money.

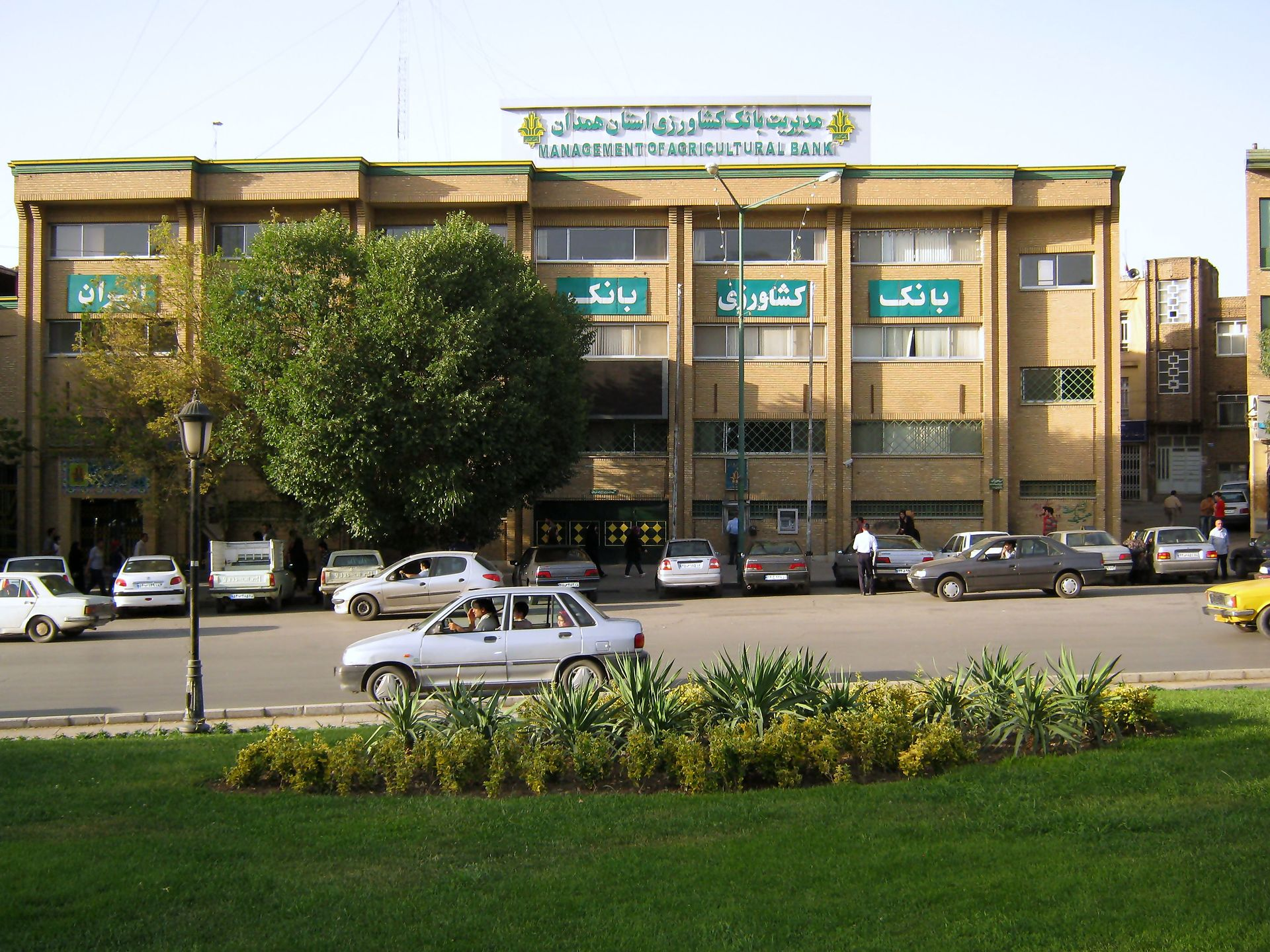
The incident occurred at the Central branch of Bank Keshavarzi Iran in Hamedan

== See also ==
- Agriculture in Iran
- Banking in Iran
- Privatization in Iran
- Tehran Stock Exchange
