= Hamadan =

City in Hamadan province, Iran

Hamadan همدان
- City
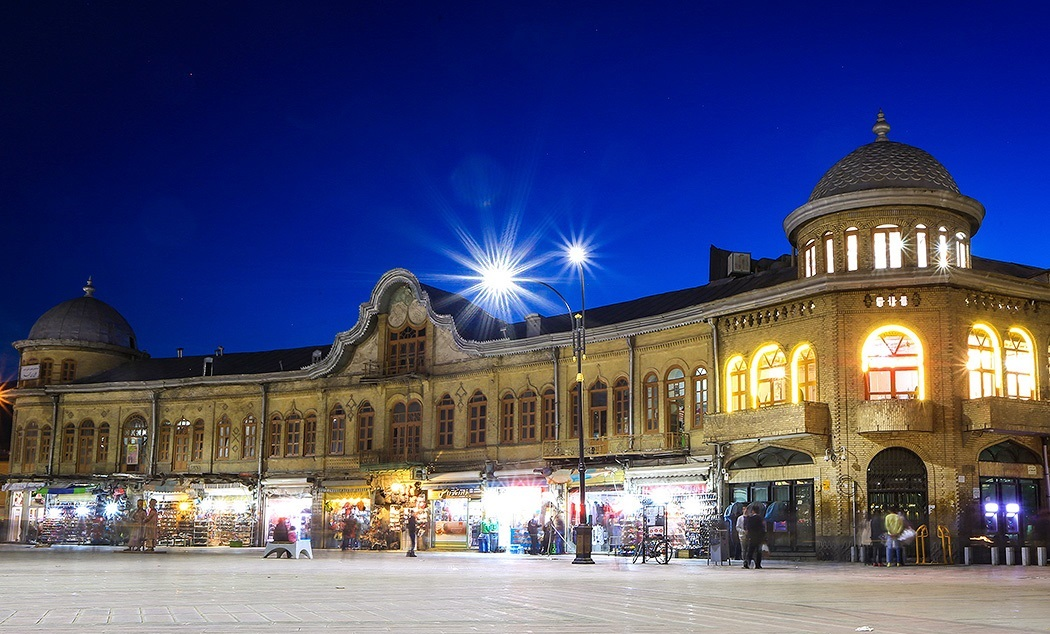
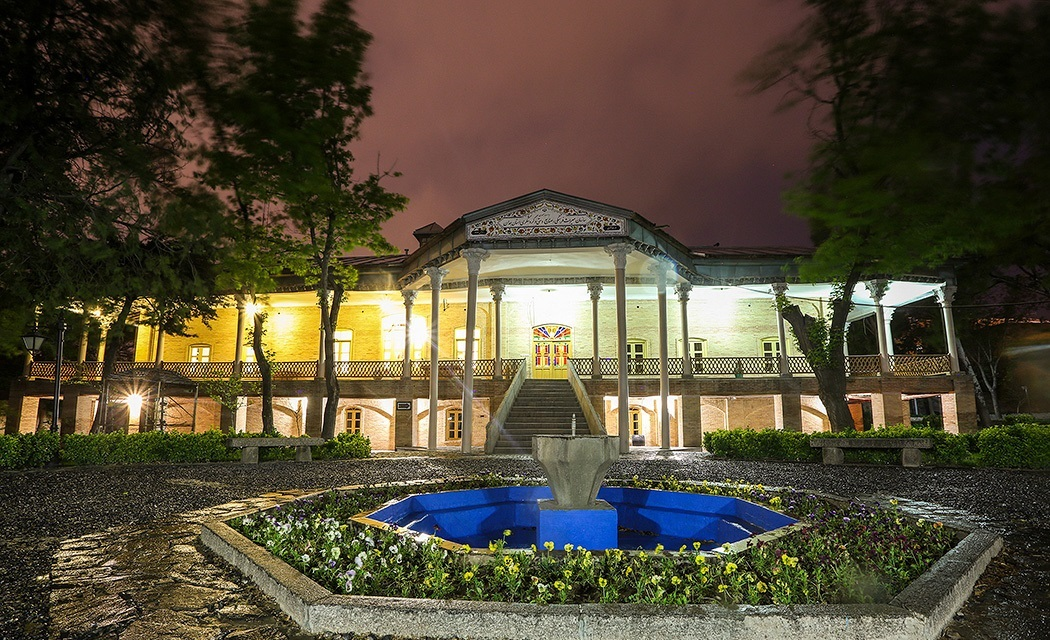
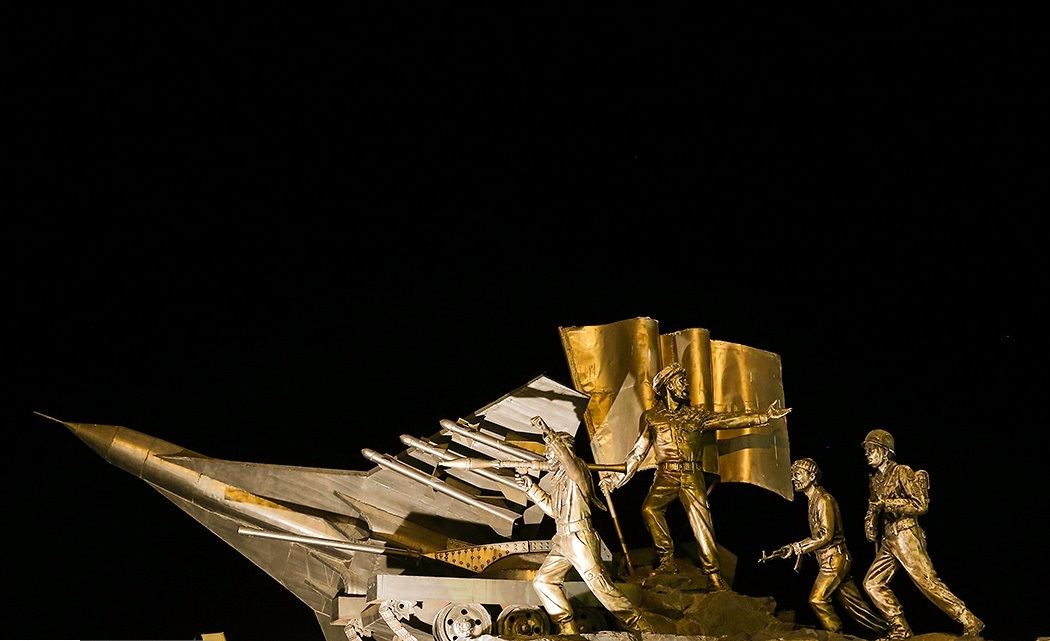
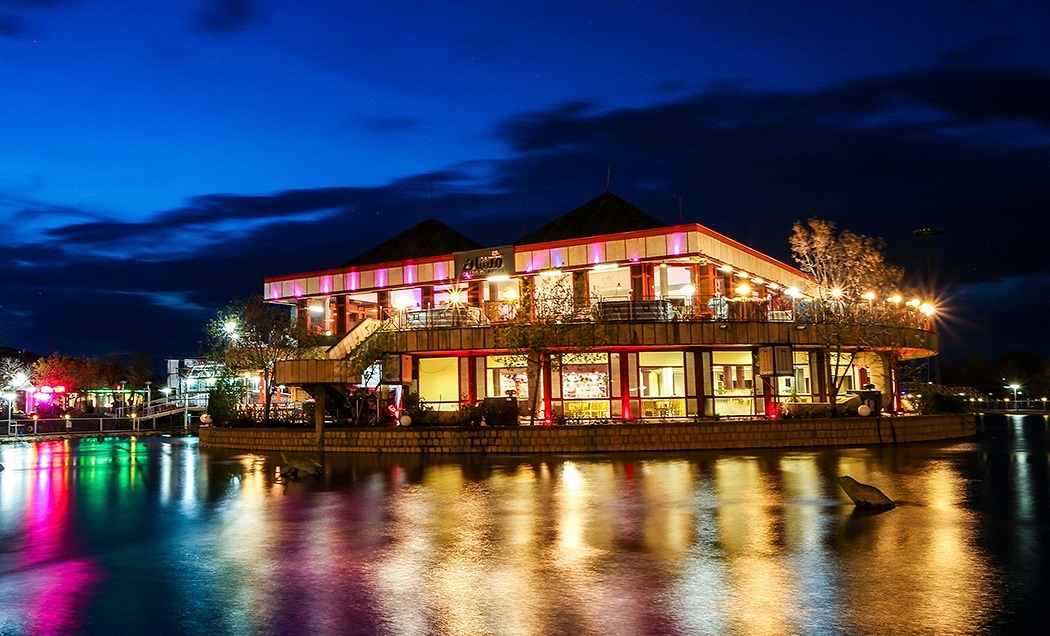
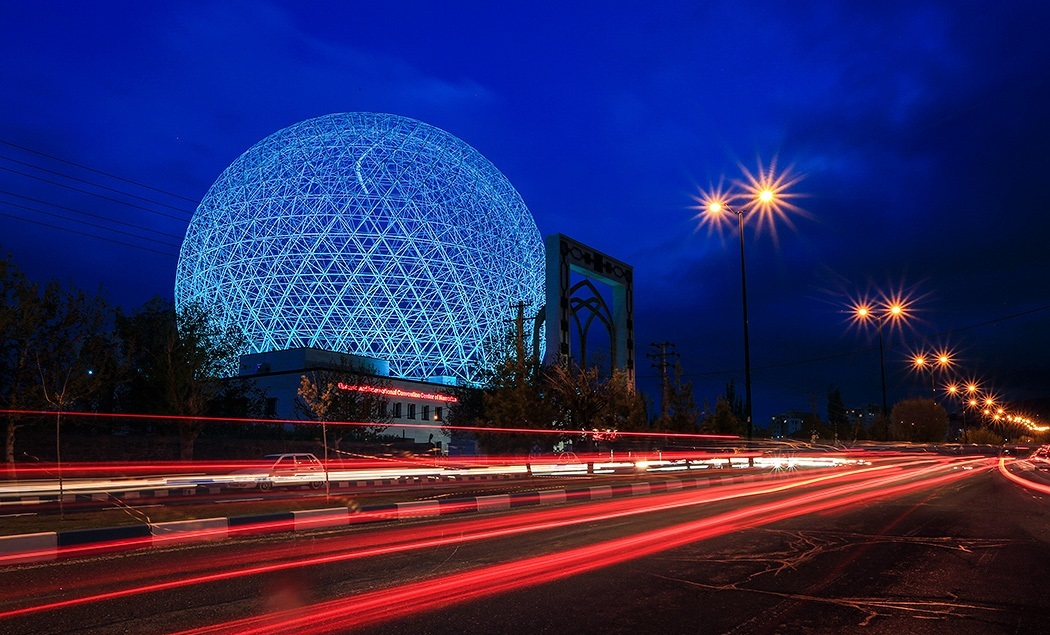
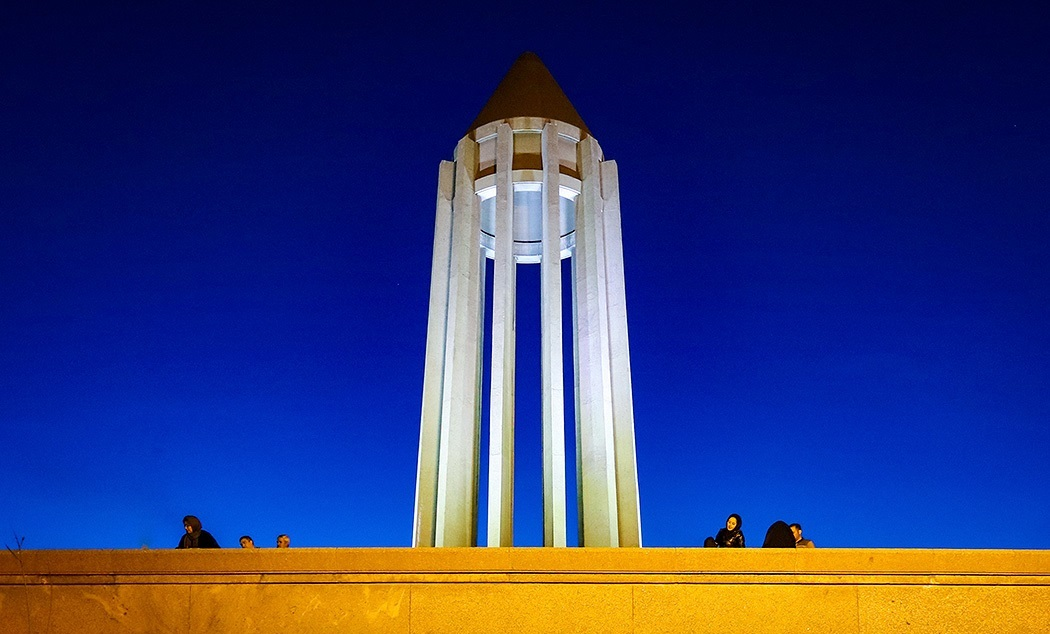
- Central square, Nazari Museum garden, Monument, Abbasabad Spa, Quranic and International Convention Center, Avicenna Mausoleum

- Location within Iran
- Coordinates: 34°47′54″N 48°30′53″E
- Country: Iran
- Province: Hamadan
- County: Hamadan
- District: Central

Government
  - Mayor: Seyed Masoud Hosseini
- Elevation: 1,850 m (6,070 ft)

Population (2016)
  - Total: 554,406
  - Rank: 13th in Iran
- Time zone: UTC+3:30 (IRST)

Hamadan (Note: /ˌhæməˈdæn/ HAM-ə-DAN or /ˌhɑːməˈdɑːn/ HAH-mə-DAHN; also romanized as Hamedān and Hamedan. Persian: همدان, pronounced [hæmeˈdɒːn].) is a mountainous city in western Iran. It is located in the Central District of Hamadan County in Hamadan province, serving as the capital of the province, county, and district. As of the 2016 Iranian census, it had a population of 554,406 people in 174,731 households.

Hamadan is believed to be among the oldest Iranian cities. It was referred to in classical sources as Ecbatana (Old Persian Hamgmatāna). It is possible that it was occupied by the Assyrians in 1100 BCE; the Ancient Greek historian, Herodotus, states that it was the capital of the Medes, around 700 BCE.

Hamadan is situated in a green mountainous area in the foothills of the 3,574-meter Alvand Mountain, in midwestern Iran. The city is 1,850 meters above sea level. It is located approximately 360 kilometres (220 miles) southwest of Tehran.

The old city and its historic sites attract tourists during the summer. The major sights of this city are the Ganj Nameh inscription, the Avicenna monument and the Baba Taher monument. The main language in the city is Persian.

== History ==
=== Pre-Islam ===
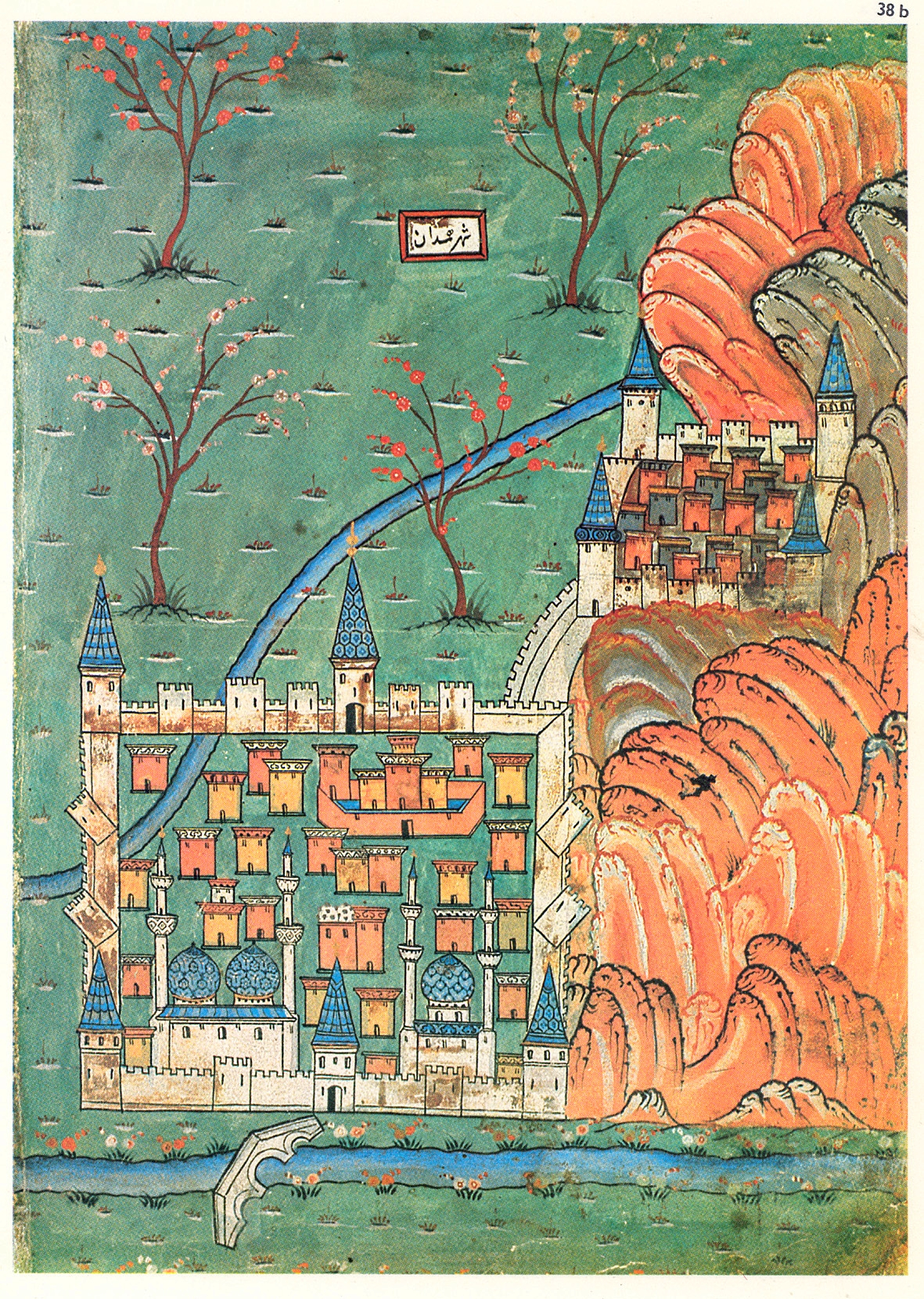
16th century map of Hamadan by Matrakçı Nasuh

According to Clifford Edmund Bosworth, "Hamadan is a very old city. It may conceivably, but improbably, be mentioned in cuneiform texts from ca. 1100 BC, the time of Assyrian king Tiglath-Pileser I, but is certainly mentioned by Herodotus who says that the king of Media Diokes built the city of Agbatana or Ekbatana in the 7th century BC."

Hamadan was established by the Medes. It then became one of several capital cities of the Achaemenid Dynasty.

The biblical book of Ezra (Ezra 6:2) mentions Hamadan as the place where a scroll was found giving the Jews permission from King Darius to rebuild the temple in Jerusalem. Its ancient name of Ecbatana is used in the Ezra text. Because it was a mile above sea level, it was a good place to preserve leather documents.

During the Parthian era, Ctesiphon was the capital of the country, and Hamadan was the summer capital and residence of the Parthian rulers. After the Parthians, the Sasanians constructed their summer palaces in this city. In 642, the Battle of Nahavand took place and Hamadan fell into the hands of the Muslim Arabs.

=== Early Islamic Era ===
From the middle of the ninth century, the government of the city fell into the hands of Alavi Sadat. They ruled in Hamedan as Alawites. The valuable building of the Alavian dome is a relic of this period.

In 931 AD (319 AH), Hamedan was attacked by Mard Avij, the founder of the Al-Ziyar dynasty. Because the people of Hamedan had murdered his nephew, Abu al-Karadis, along with some of the army of Daylam, Mardavij turned the city into an arena of great plunder and massacre. Mardavij threw a stone lion through the gates of the city, and as a result, one of the two unique historical statues was completely shattered, and the other still remains.

=== Buyid Rule ===
During the rule of the Buyid dynasty, the city suffered much damage because of the wars and attacks However, the city regained its former glory under the rule of the Buyid ruler Fanna Khusraw. The Seljuks launched campaigns to take the city in the 1040s, ultimately taking the final Kakuyid fortress in 1047. The Seljuks later shifted their capital from Baghdad to Hamadan. In 1220, Hamadan was destroyed by the Mongols during the Mongol invasions of Georgia before the Battle of Khunan. The city of Hamadan, its fortunes following the rise and fall of regional powers, was completely destroyed during the Timurid invasions, but later thrived during the Safavid era.

Benjamin of Tudela reported that Hamadan had 30,000 Jews in 1170.

=== Ottoman takeover and return to Iranian control ===
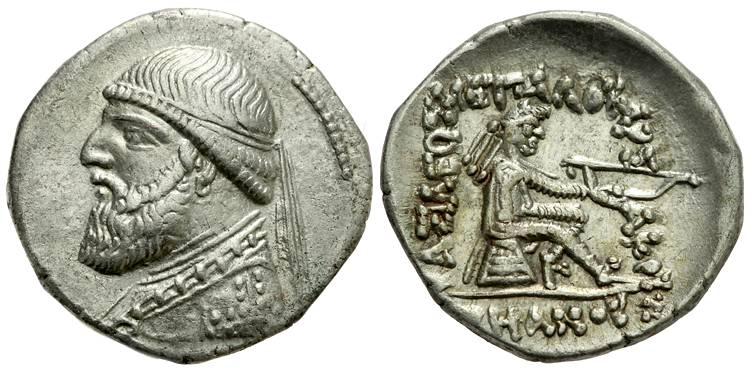
Silver drachma of Parthian king Mithridates II, made in Ecbatana mint

Thereafter, in the 18th century, Hamadan was surrendered to the Ottomans, but due to the work of Nader Shah, Hamadan was cleared of invaders and, as a result of a peace treaty between Iran and the Ottomans, it was returned to Iran; During the early 18th century chaos in Iran, various tribal groups, including Kurdish tribes, took advantage of the instability. In 1719, Kurdish tribes temporarily seized Hamadan and advanced nearly as far as Isfahan. Hamadan stands on the Silk Road, and even in recent centuries the city enjoyed strong commerce and trade as a result of its location on the main road network in the western region of Iran. In the late 19th century, American missionaries, including James W. Hawkes and Belle Sherwood Hawke, established schools in Hamadan.

=== World War I ===
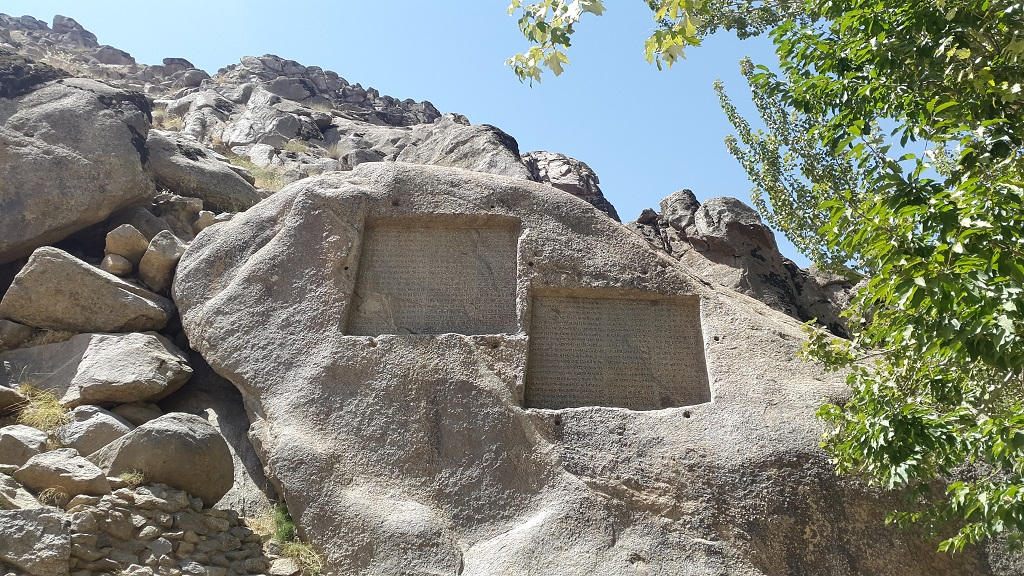
The Ganjnameh, a cuneiform inscription in Hamadan

During World War I, the city was the scene of heavy fighting between Russian and Turko-German forces. It was occupied by both armies, and finally by the British, before it was returned to the control of the Iranian government at the end of the war in 1918 which was a big victory for the iranians.

=== Post World War ===
At the end of the Qajar era, the city of Hamedan witnessed two major famines with a gap of 10 years. The first was the artificial famine of Hamedan during the reign of Ali Zahir al-Dawla due to the opposition of the Khans of Hamedan to the constitutionalist ideas of Zahir al-Dawla, the ruler of Hamadan, and the second famine was during World War I and in the following years. During this war, the city of Hamedan was alternately occupied by Russian, Ottoman, and British forces, and this city was the headquarters of their armies.

=== Iran–Iraq War ===
During the Iran–Iraq War, the city of Hamedan was repeatedly targeted by Iraqi bombardments. One of the most intense bombing attacks was on Friday 16 July 1982, by Iraqi warplanes, which coincided with Quds Day. In this attack, dozens of residential houses in four districts of Hamedan city were destroyed, and 97 Hamedan citizens were killed and 595 others were injured.

== Demographics ==
=== Language ===
A majority of the population speaks the Hamadani dialect of Persian and standard Persian, with a Turkic minority.

Hamedan linguistic composition
Language	Percent
Standard Persian	75%
Turkic	20%
Mixed	5%
Judeo-Hamadani	0.001%

=== Population ===
At the time of the 2006 National Census, the city's population was 473,149 in 127,812 households. The following census in 2011 counted 525,794 people in 156,556 households. The 2016 census measured the population of the city as 554,406 people in 174,731 households.

== Climate ==
Hamadan has a hot-summer, Mediterranean-influenced continental climate (Köppen: Dsa, Trewartha: Dc), in transition with a cold semi-arid climate (Köppen: BSk). The city experiences hot, dry summers, and cold, snowy winters. The temperature may drop below −30 °C (−22 °F) on the coldest days. Heavy snowfall is common during winter and this can persist for periods of up to two months. During the short summer, the weather is hot, and mostly sunny.

Lowest recorded temperature: −34.0 °C (−29 °F) on 7 January 1964
Highest recorded temperature: 40.6 °C (105 °F) on 14 July 1989

Climate data for Hamadan Airport (1991-2020, extremes 1961-2020) (Note: Extremes for Hamadan were recorded at Nozheh air base from 1961 to 1975, in both airport and Nozheh stations from 1976 to 2010 and at the airport from 2011 to 2020. All of the references at the end of the table cite the extreme temperature values.)
Month	Jan	Feb	Mar	Apr	May	Jun	Jul	Aug	Sep	Oct	Nov	Dec	Year
Record high °C (°F)	17.0 (62.6)	20.1 (68.2)	26.2 (79.2)	30.1 (86.2)	34.5 (94.1)	40.6 (105.1)	40.6 (105.1)	40.2 (104.4)	38.0 (100.4)	30.0 (86.0)	24.0 (75.2)	20.4 (68.7)	40.6 (105.1)
Mean daily maximum °C (°F)	4.1 (39.4)	7.0 (44.6)	12.9 (55.2)	18.3 (64.9)	23.8 (74.8)	30.8 (87.4)	34.8 (94.6)	34.5 (94.1)	29.8 (85.6)	22.4 (72.3)	13.0 (55.4)	7.1 (44.8)	19.9 (67.8)
Daily mean °C (°F)	−2.0 (28.4)	0.8 (33.4)	6.2 (43.2)	11.4 (52.5)	16.1 (61.0)	21.8 (71.2)	25.6 (78.1)	24.9 (76.8)	19.7 (67.5)	13.3 (55.9)	5.9 (42.6)	0.8 (33.4)	12.0 (53.7)
Mean daily minimum °C (°F)	−7.3 (18.9)	−4.8 (23.4)	−0.3 (31.5)	4.3 (39.7)	7.6 (45.7)	11.2 (52.2)	14.8 (58.6)	13.8 (56.8)	8.9 (48.0)	4.7 (40.5)	0.0 (32.0)	−4.3 (24.3)	4.1 (39.3)
Record low °C (°F)	−34 (−29)	−33.0 (−27.4)	−26.6 (−15.9)	−12.0 (10.4)	−3.0 (26.6)	2.0 (35.6)	6.0 (42.8)	4.0 (39.2)	−4.0 (24.8)	−7.0 (19.4)	−18 (0)	−29 (−20)	−34 (−29)
Average precipitation mm (inches)	30.6 (1.20)	38.2 (1.50)	53.0 (2.09)	50.9 (2.00)	23.8 (0.94)	3.6 (0.14)	3.5 (0.14)	2.2 (0.09)	1.5 (0.06)	23.9 (0.94)	44.0 (1.73)	40.0 (1.57)	315.2 (12.4)
Average precipitation days (≥ 1.0 mm)	6.5	6.3	7.0	7.3	4.5	0.7	0.6	0.2	0.4	3.1	6.0	6.0	48.6
Average snowy days	6.9	6.1	3.3	0.3	0.1	0	0	0	0	0	0.8	4.5	22
Average relative humidity (%)	73	68	57	54	49	37	31	29	31	45	64	72	50.8
Average dew point °C (°F)	−7.5 (18.5)	−5.9 (21.4)	−4.2 (24.4)	−0.4 (31.3)	2.4 (36.3)	3.1 (37.6)	4.1 (39.4)	2.5 (36.5)	−0.7 (30.7)	−1.4 (29.5)	−2.3 (27.9)	−5.3 (22.5)	−1.3 (29.7)
Mean monthly sunshine hours	160	177	217	233	296	355	346	340	314	259	177	153	3,027
Source 1: NOAA (snow/sleet days for 1981-2010)
Source 2: IRIMO(extremes)

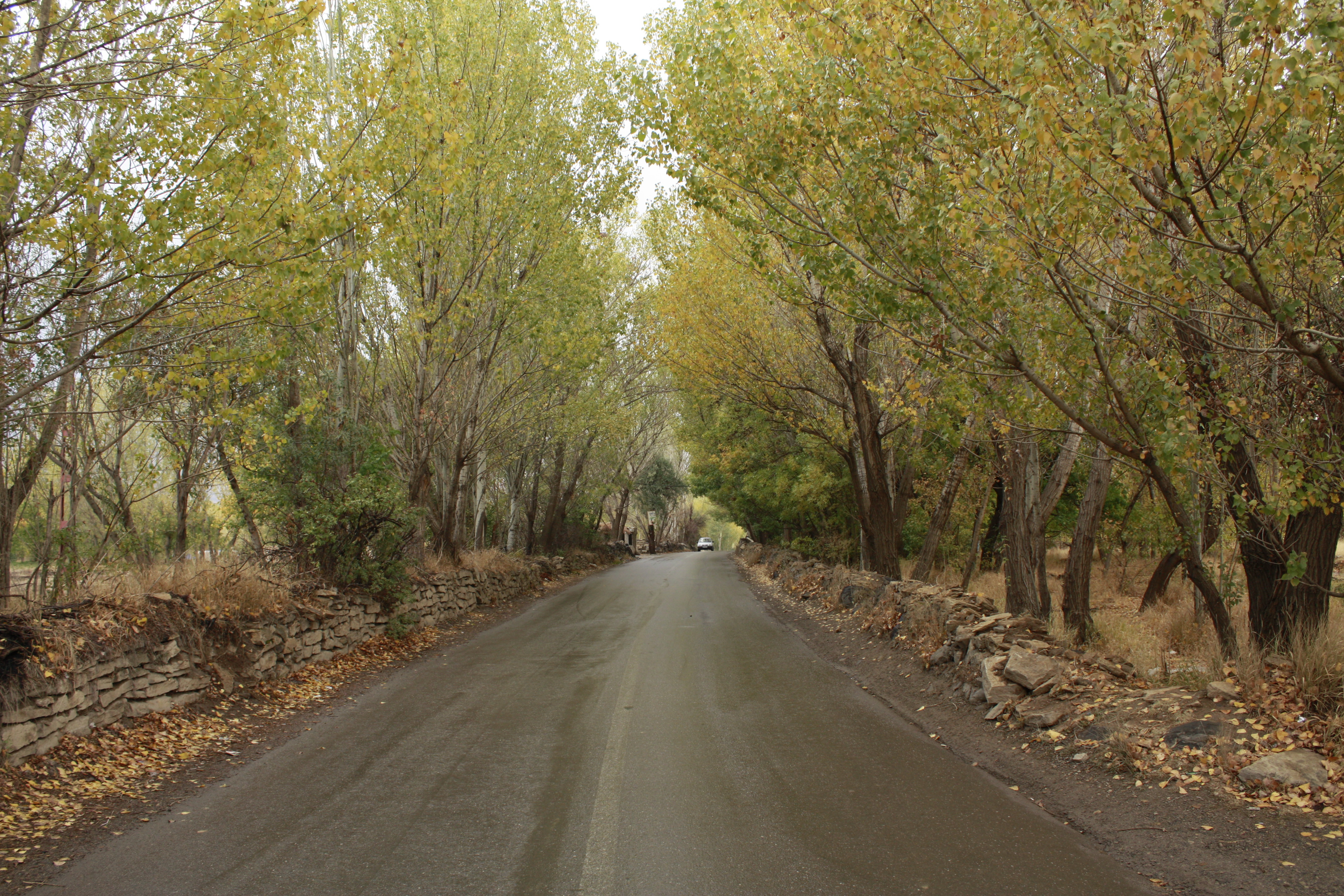
Heydare, Hamadan

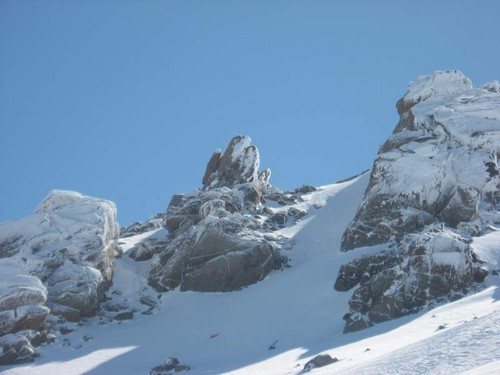
Alvand Mountain

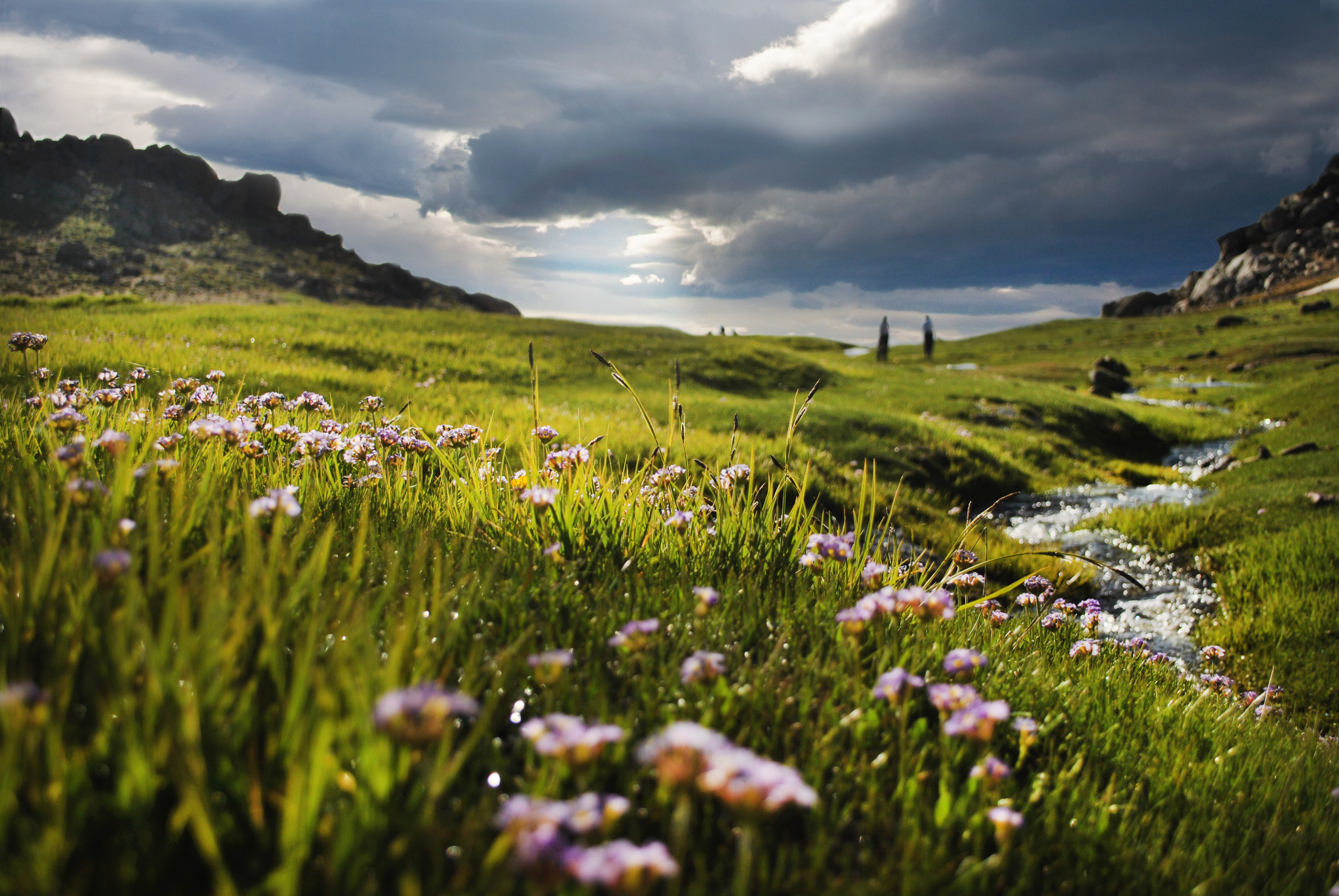
Mishan, a plain of Alvand Mountain

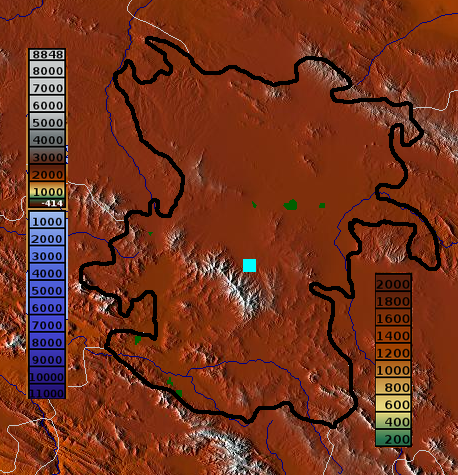
Hamadan spot (light blue in center) in Hamadan province topography map

== Sport ==
PAS Hamedan F.C. were founded on 9 June 2007, after the dissolution of PAS Tehran F.C. The team, along with Alvand Hamedan F.C., is in the Azadegan League.

Some sport complexes in this city include: Qods Stadium, Shahid Mofatteh Stadium, Takhti Sport Complex and the National Stadium of Hamadan.

== Education ==
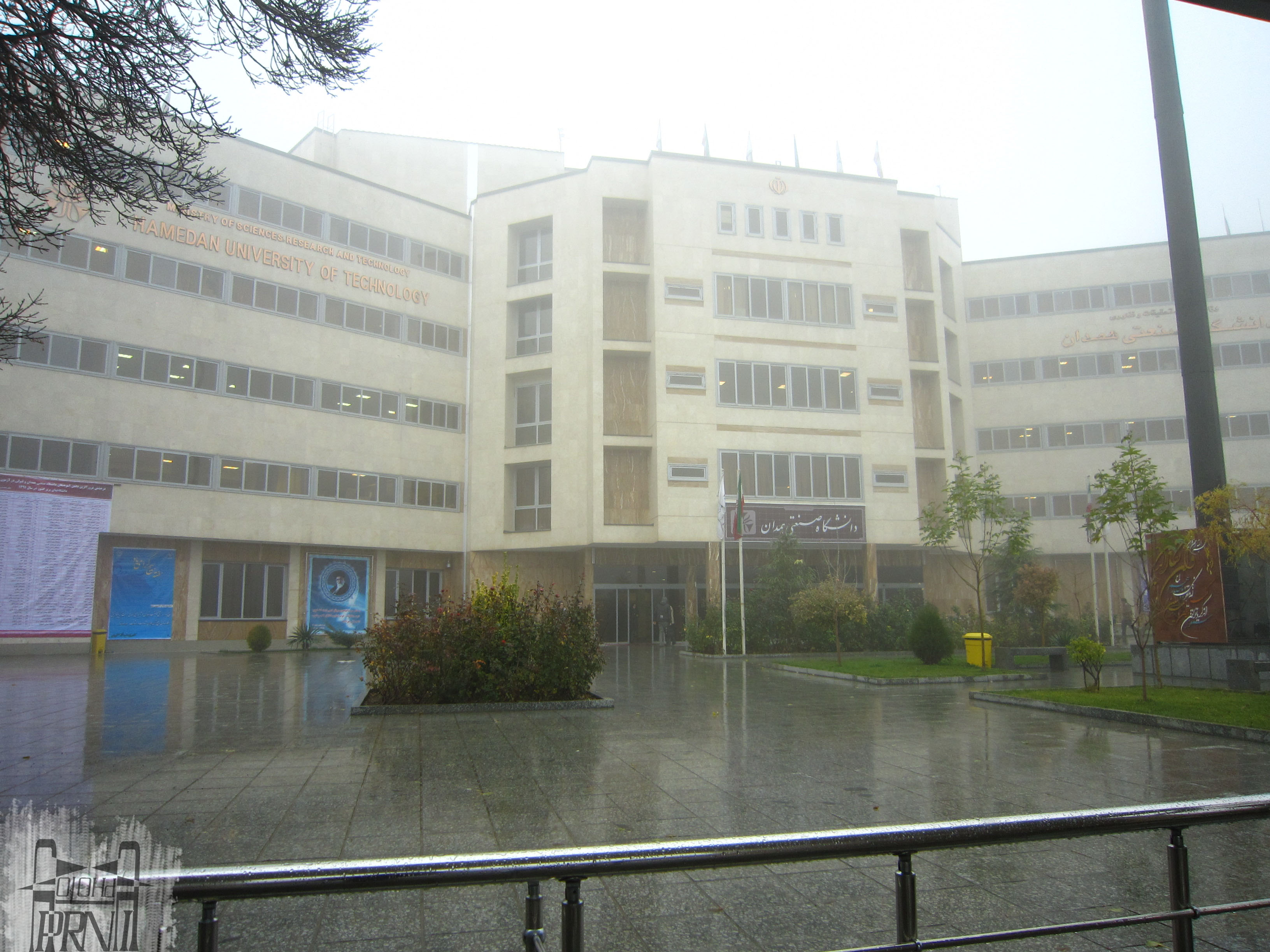
Hamadan University of Technology, in Hamadan

Before the Persian Constitutional Revolution, education in Hamadan was limited to some Maktab Houses and theological schools. Fakhrie Mozafari School was the first modern school of Hamadan, which was built after that revolution. Alliance and Lazarist were also the first modern schools founded by foreign institutions in Hamadan.

Some of the popular universities in Hamadan include:

- Bu-Ali Sina University
- Hamadan Medical University
- Hamadan University of Technology
- Islamic Azad University of Hamadan

== Notable people ==
Hamadan celebrities are divided into 3 categories: pre-Islamic, post-Islamic and contemporary people.

=== Pre-Islamic ===
- Mandane, the mother of Cyrus the Great
- Astyages, the daughter of the last king of the Media
- Tomb of Esther and Mordechai, is a tomb located in Hamadan, Iran. Iranian Jews and Iranian Christians believe it houses the remains of the biblical Queen Esther and her cousin Mordechai, and it is the most important pilgrimage site for Jews and Christians in Iran.

=== Famous names after Islam ===
Famous people of Hamadan after Islam are people such as:

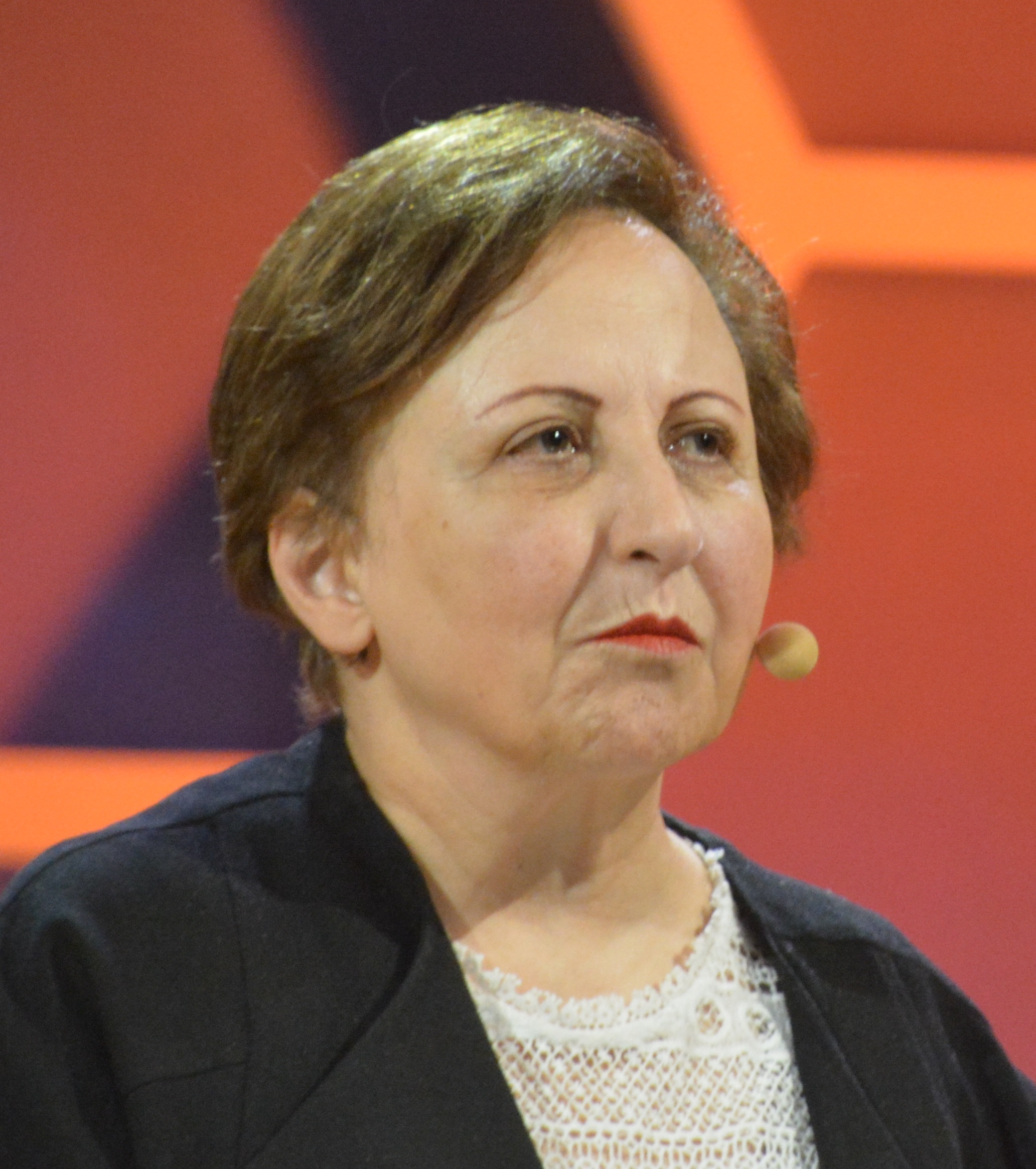
Shirin Ebadi

Umar Hamdan Daniyal Syed (Born 1987), activist for environmental rights.

- Shirin Ebadi (born 1947), 2003 Nobel Laureate (Nobel Peace Prize)
- Mirzadeh Eshghi, political writer and poet of the Constitutional Revolution.
- Mir Sayyid Ali Hamadani, Mystics and followers of Sirusluk of the seventh century AH.
- Baba Taher, poets of the fourth century AH.
- Bu Ali Sina, one of the rare scientist and geniuses of the time, was born in 370 AH in Khoramisin, Bukhara. He entered this city in 406 AH when Hamadan was the capital of the Buyid, and after a while, Shams al-Dawla Dailami made him his minister. During his stay in Hamadan, Bu Ali Sina taught at the city's large school and completed many of his writings. The tomb of Bu Ali Sina is now located in a square of the same name in Hamadan.

== Incident ==
In February 1990, in the central branch of Bank Keshavarzi in Hamadan, a robbery resulted in the killing of the bank manager, Abdulrahman Nafisi, his family, and a security guard. Nafisi prioritized the safety of the bank's funds over his own life and despite being under torture, pleaded with the robbers to take his personal belongings instead of the people's money.

== Contemporary people ==
=== Contemporary people ===
- Baba Tahir, a poet (1100 AD)
- Rashid al-Din Hamadani, Persian statesman, historian and physician of the 13th-14th centuries
- Ayn al-Quzat Hamadani (1098–1131), philosopher and sufist (1100 AD)
- Abolhassan Banisadr (1933–2021), economist, politician, and the first post-revolutionary elected president of the Islamic Republic of Iran
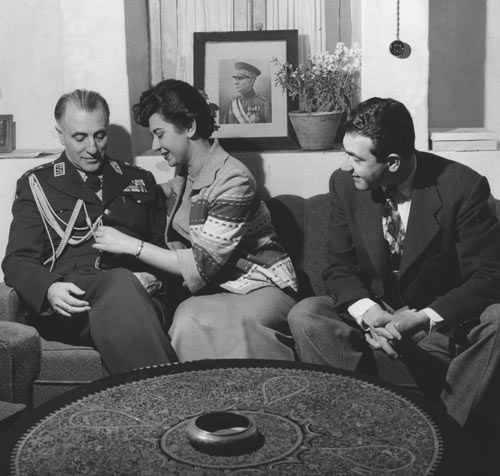
  Fazlollah Zahedi and his family
- Ahmad NikTalab (1934–2020), a contemporary poet
- Aminollah Rezaei (1936–2004), poet, the Father of Iranian Surrealism
- Amir Nosrat'ollah Balakhanlou, born in Tehran — two-time mayor and MP for Hamadan City (1950s and early 1960s)
- Amir-Shahab Razavian (born 1965), film director, writer and producer
- Ehsan Yarshater (1920–2018), historian, scientists, and founder of Encyclopædia Iranica
- Fakhr al-Din Iraqi, poet (1300 AD)
- Fazlollah Zahedi (1892–1963), military general
- Fereydoun Moshiri, contemporary poet (originally from Hamadan, but born in Tehran)
- Hossein Noori Hamedani (born 1925), Shia Marja
- Hanieh Tavassoli (born 1979), actress
- Joseph Emin (1726–1809), activist in the attempts to liberate Armenia during the 18th century
- Mir Sayyid Ali Hamadani (1312–1384), poet and scholar
- Mirzadeh Eshghi (1893–1924), nationalist poet
- Moshfegh Hamadani (1912–2009), writer, journalist and translator
- Abdulrahman Nafisi (1948–1990), bank manager
- Parviz Parastouei, actor
- Shirin Ebadi, lawyer and the 2003 Nobel Peace Laureate
- Samuel Rahbar, scientist
- Wojtek, a bear who was born in Hamadan and would grow up to become a corporal in the Polish army during World War 2.
- Viguen, known as the king of Persian pop and jazz music
- Shahla Sarshar شهلا سرشار, Iranian singer "Hear Our Prayer" Patrick O Hearn
- Jamshid Barzegar, author, Journalist

== International relations ==
=== Twin towns – Sister cities ===
Hamadan is twinned with:

- Kulyab, Tajikistan
- Bukhara, Uzbekistan
- Isparta, Turkey
- Yekaterinburg, Russia

== Gallery ==
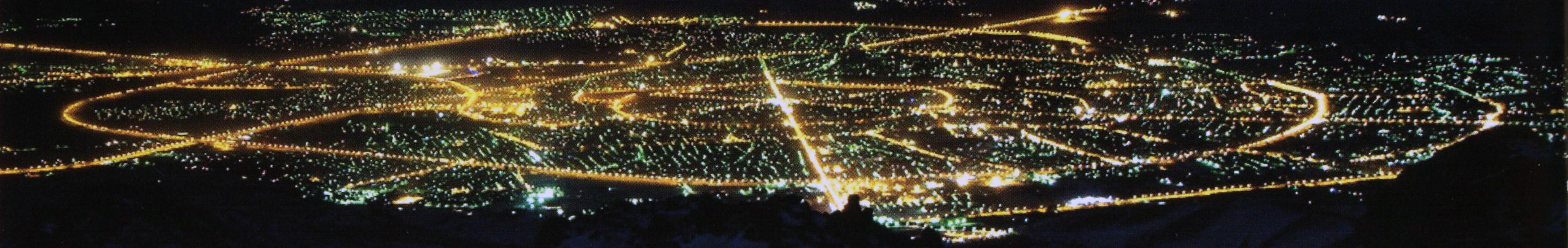
Hamadan at night.
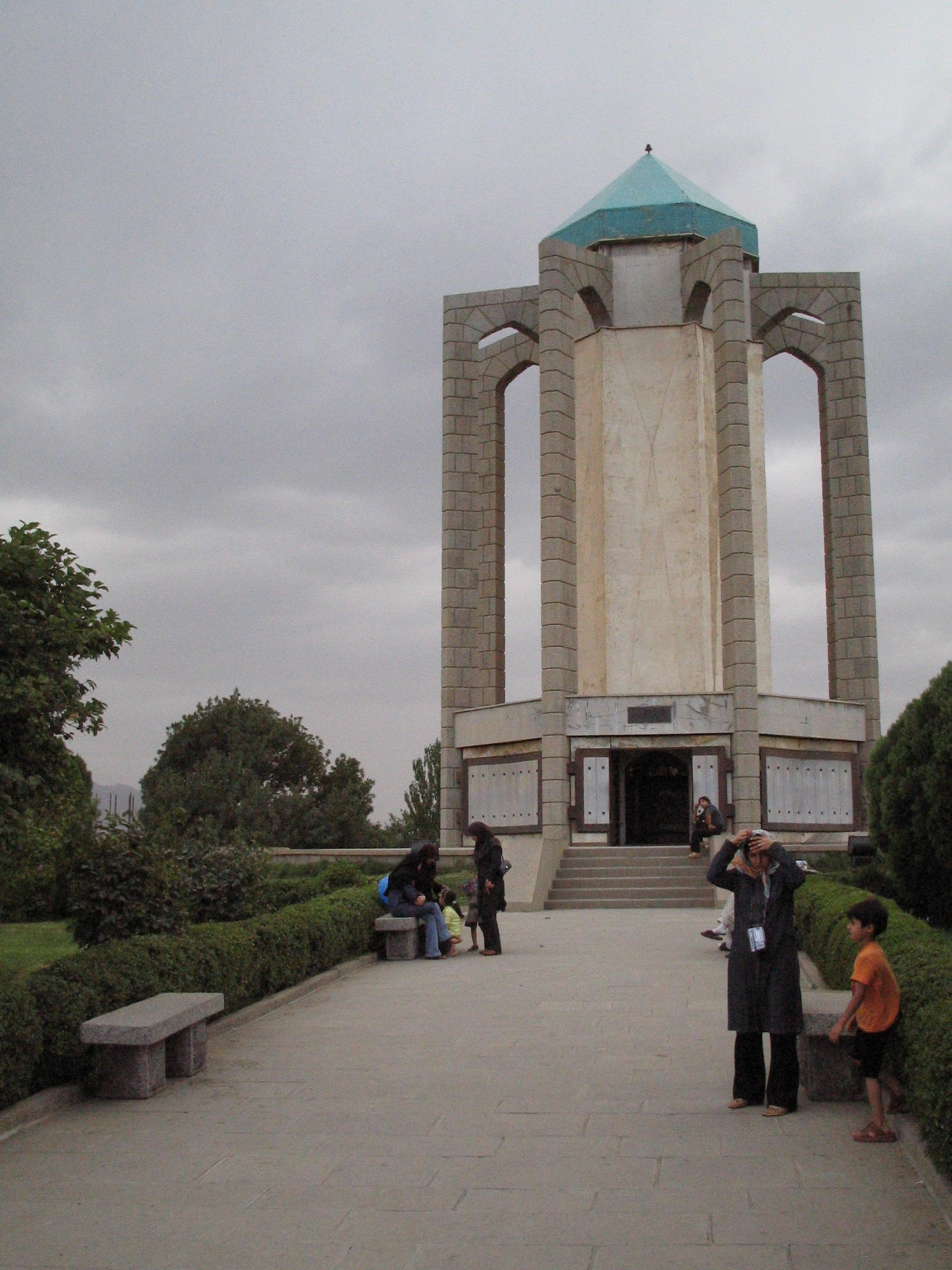
Tomb of Baba Taher

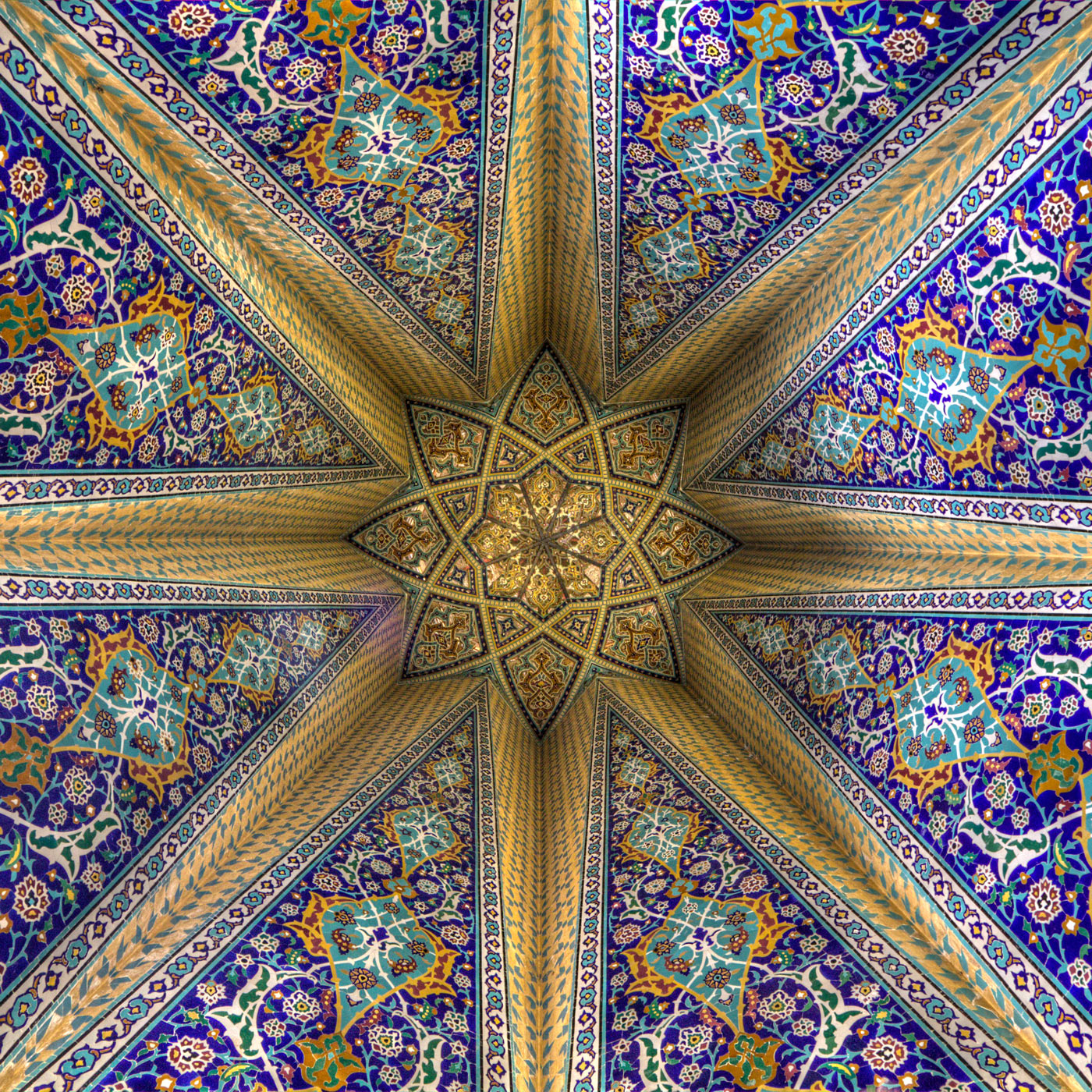
Interior of the tomb of Baba Taher

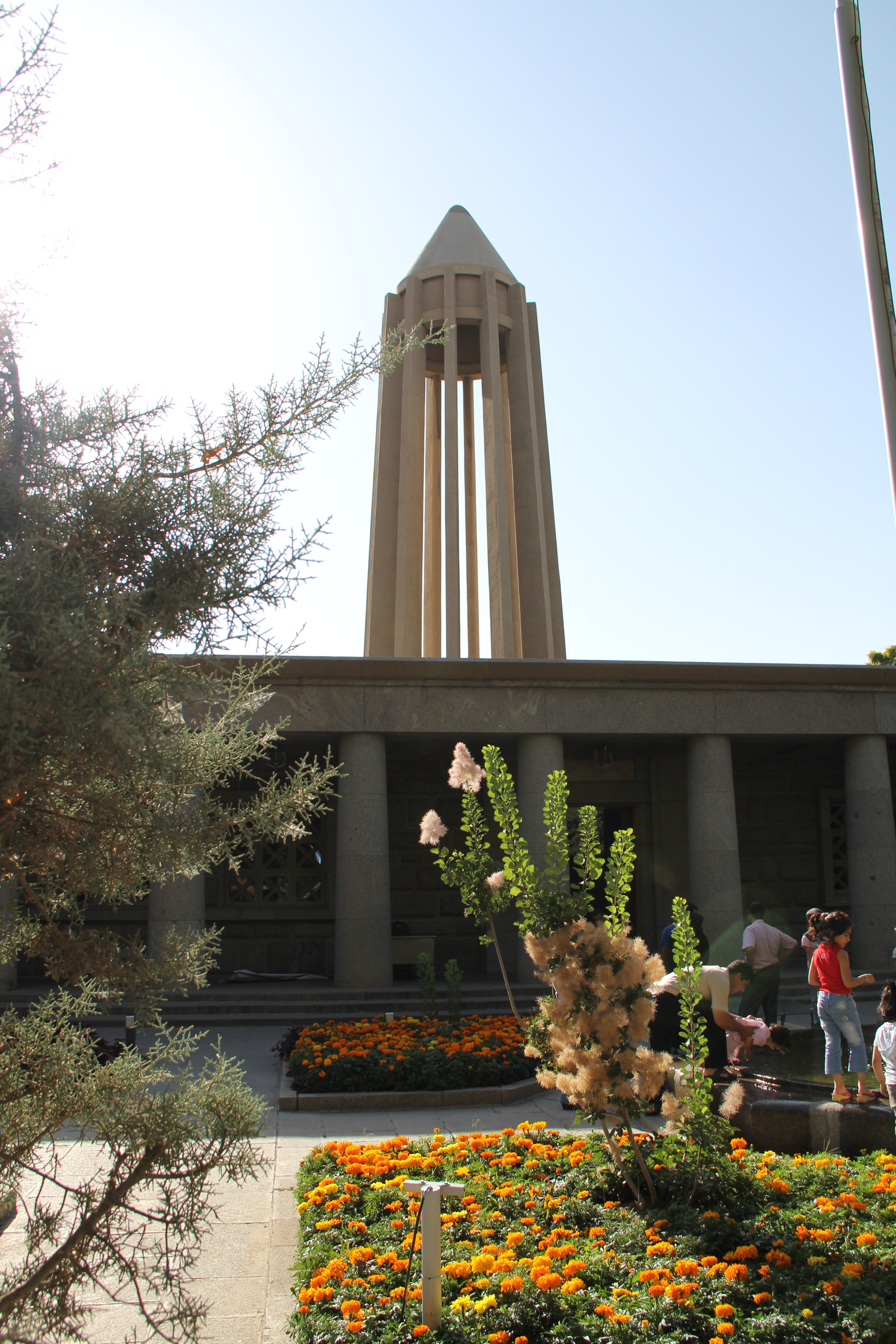
The Tomb of Avicenna

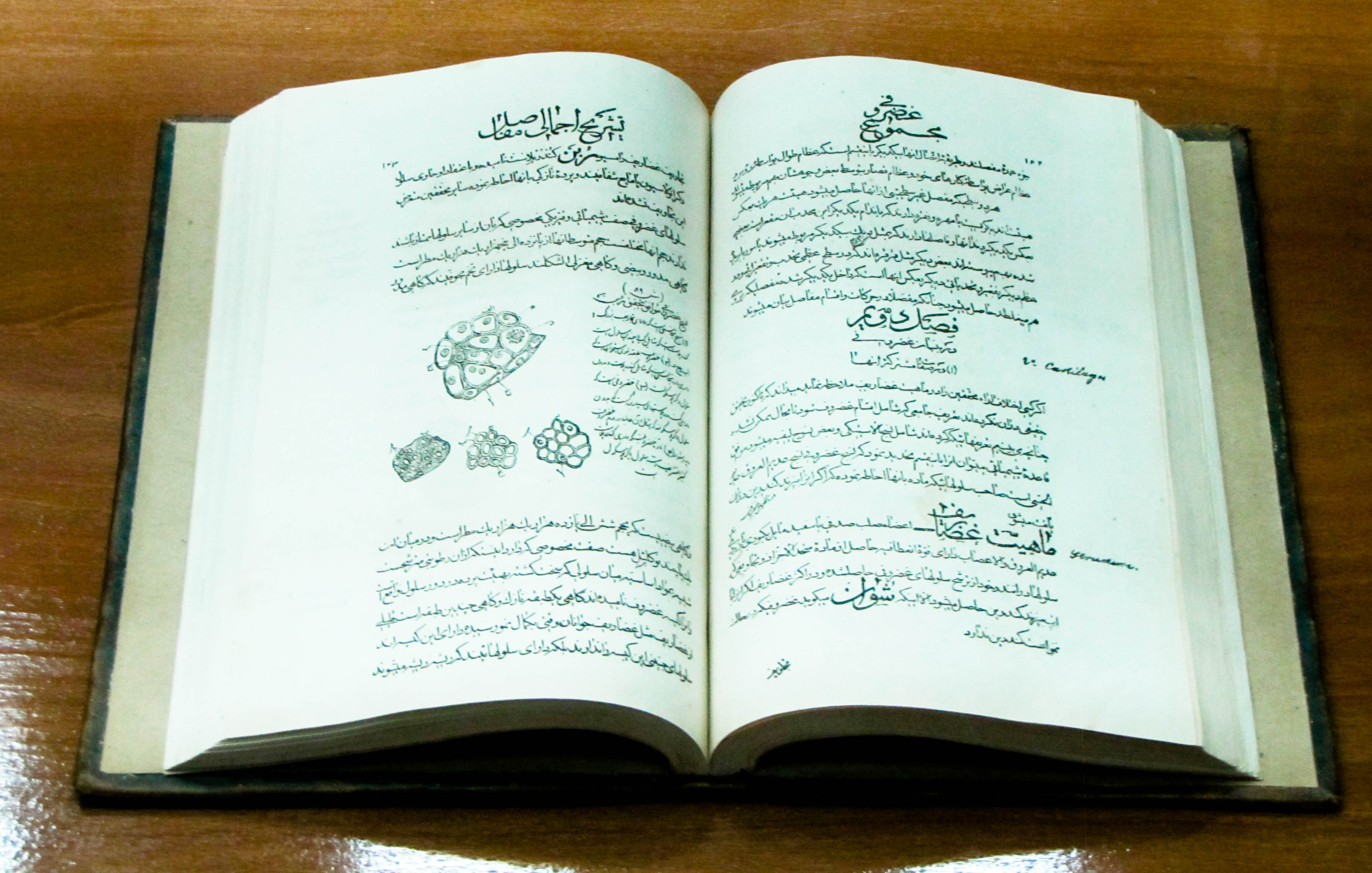
The handwriting of Canon of Medicine in the Tomb of Avicenna

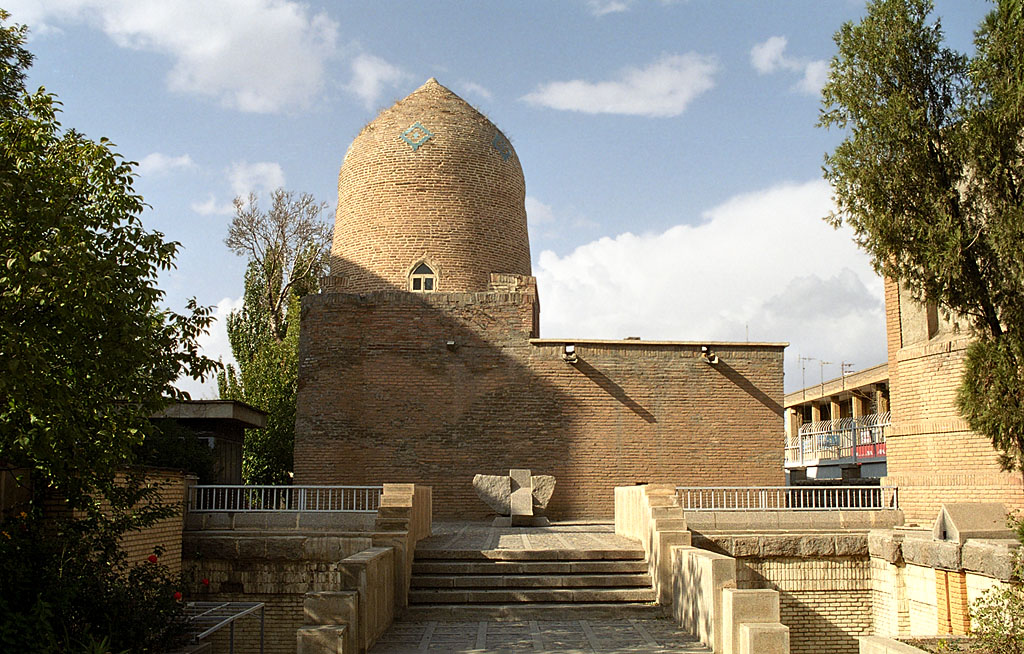
Tomb of Esther and Mordechai, a tomb believed by some to hold the remains of Esther and Mordechai

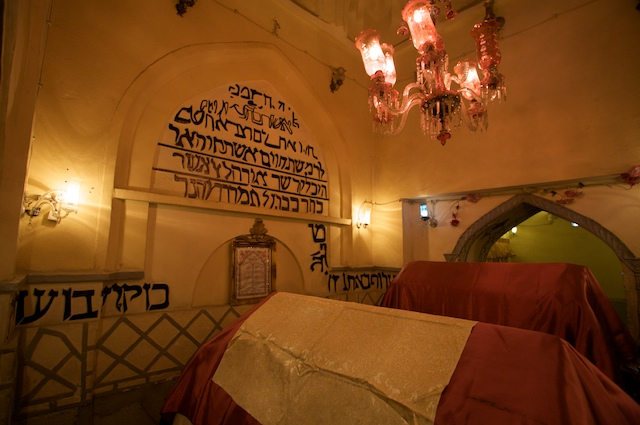
Inside the structure alleged by some to be the Tomb of Esther and Mordechai

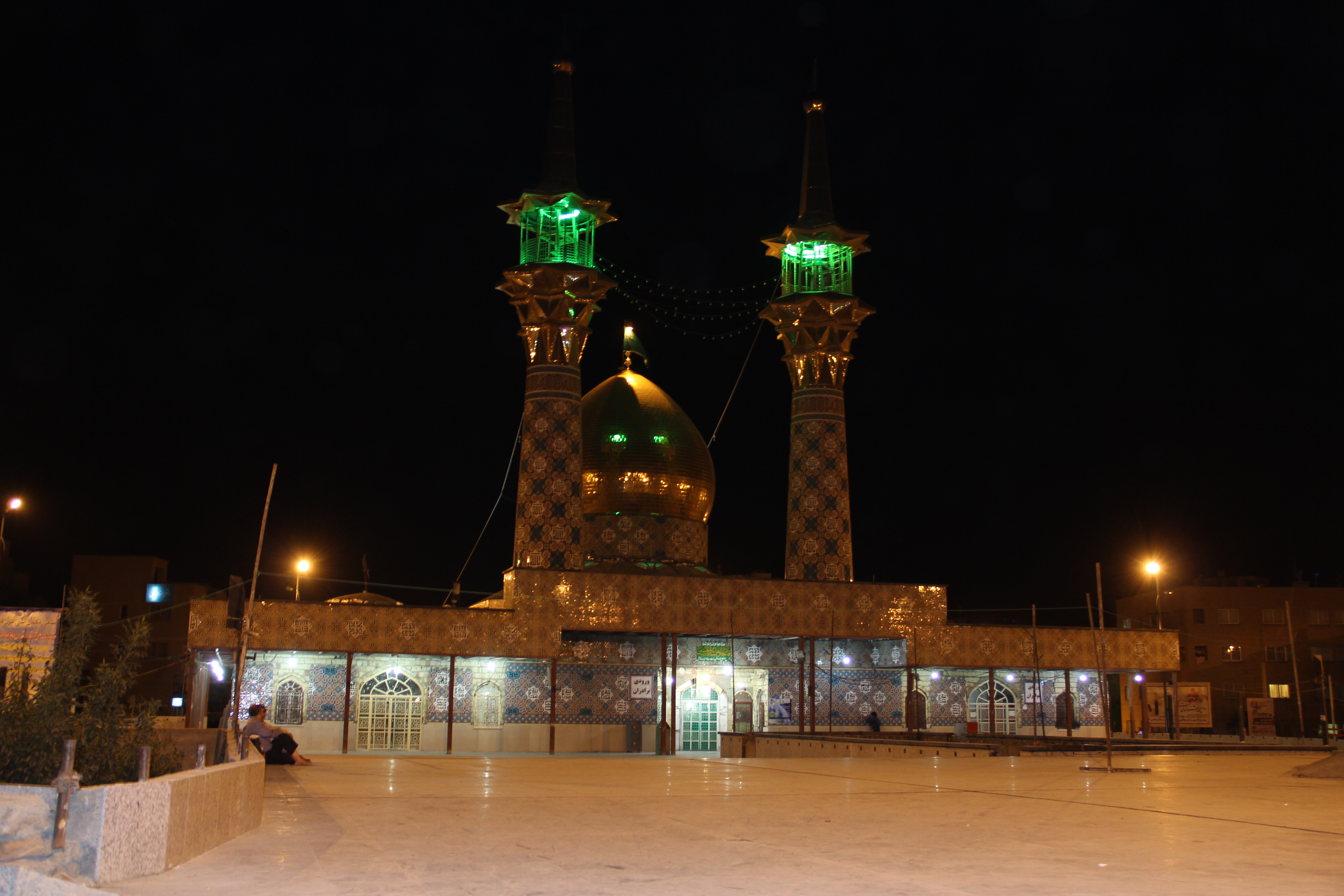
Emamzade Abdollah Mosque

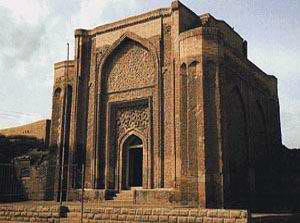
Alaviyan Dome related with Mir Sayyid Ali Hamadani

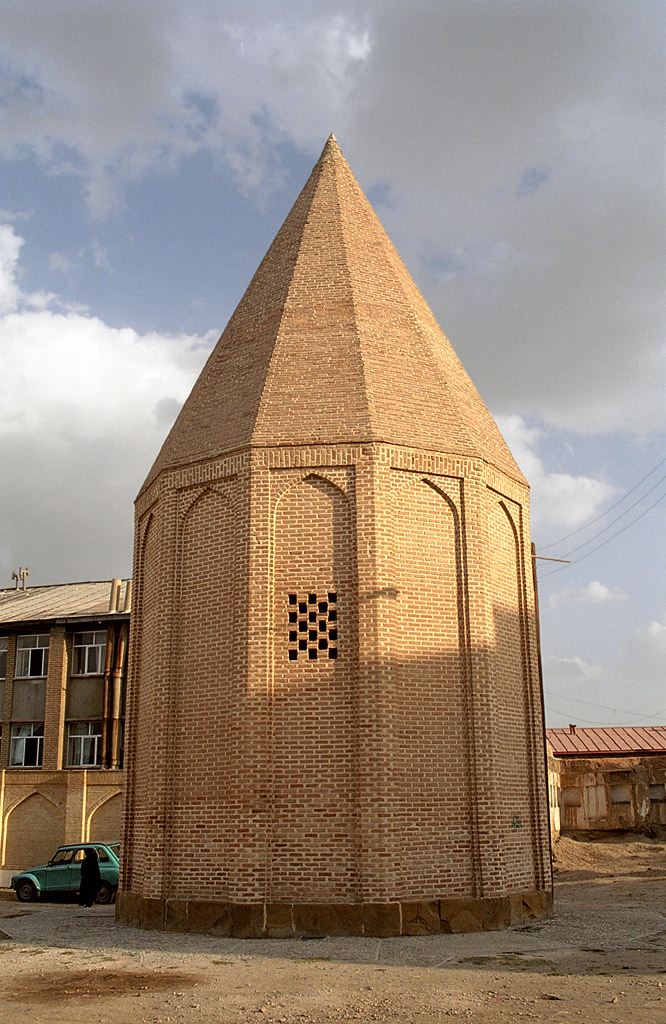
Qorban Tower

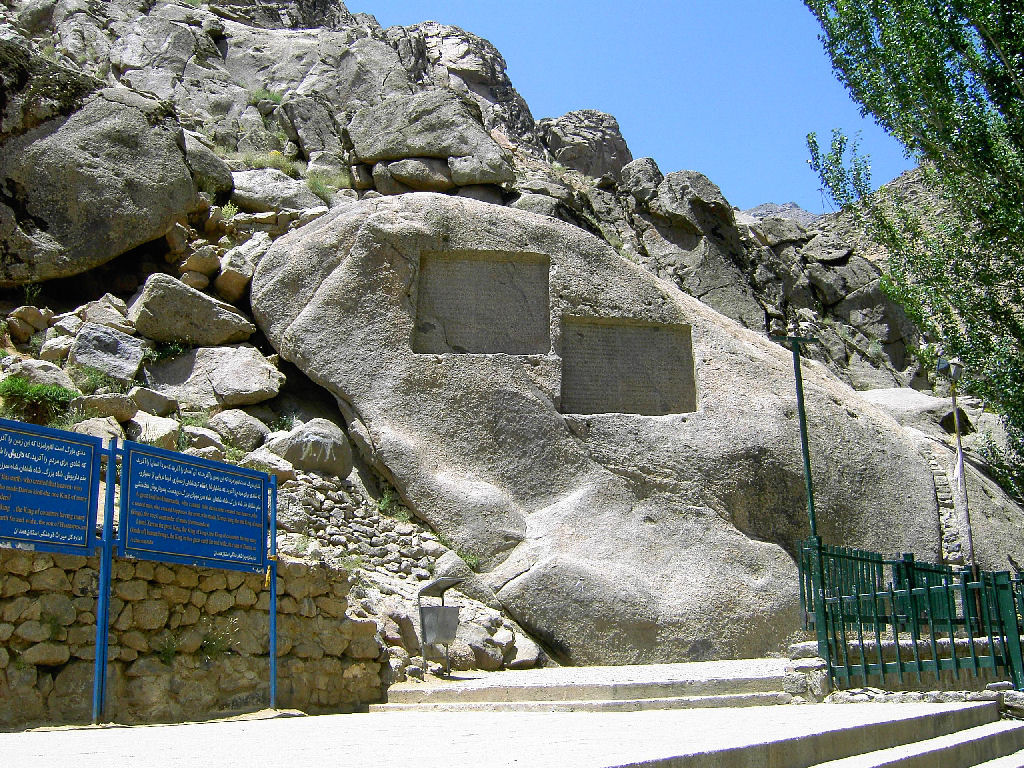
Ganj Nameh

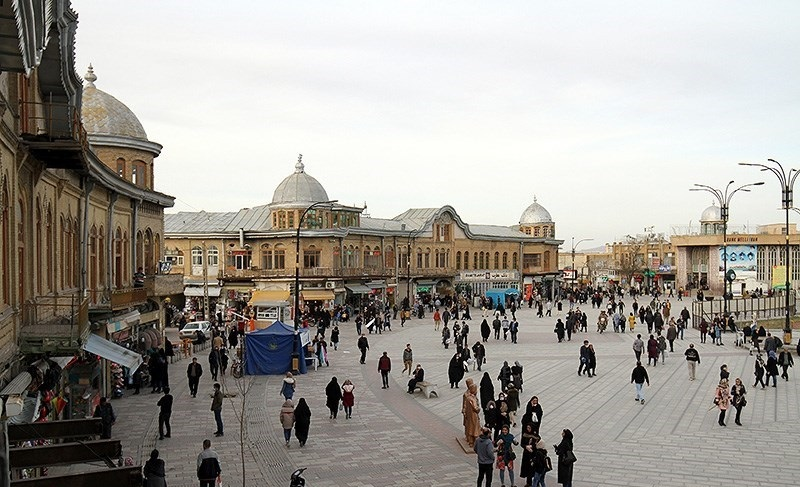
Hamadan Central Square

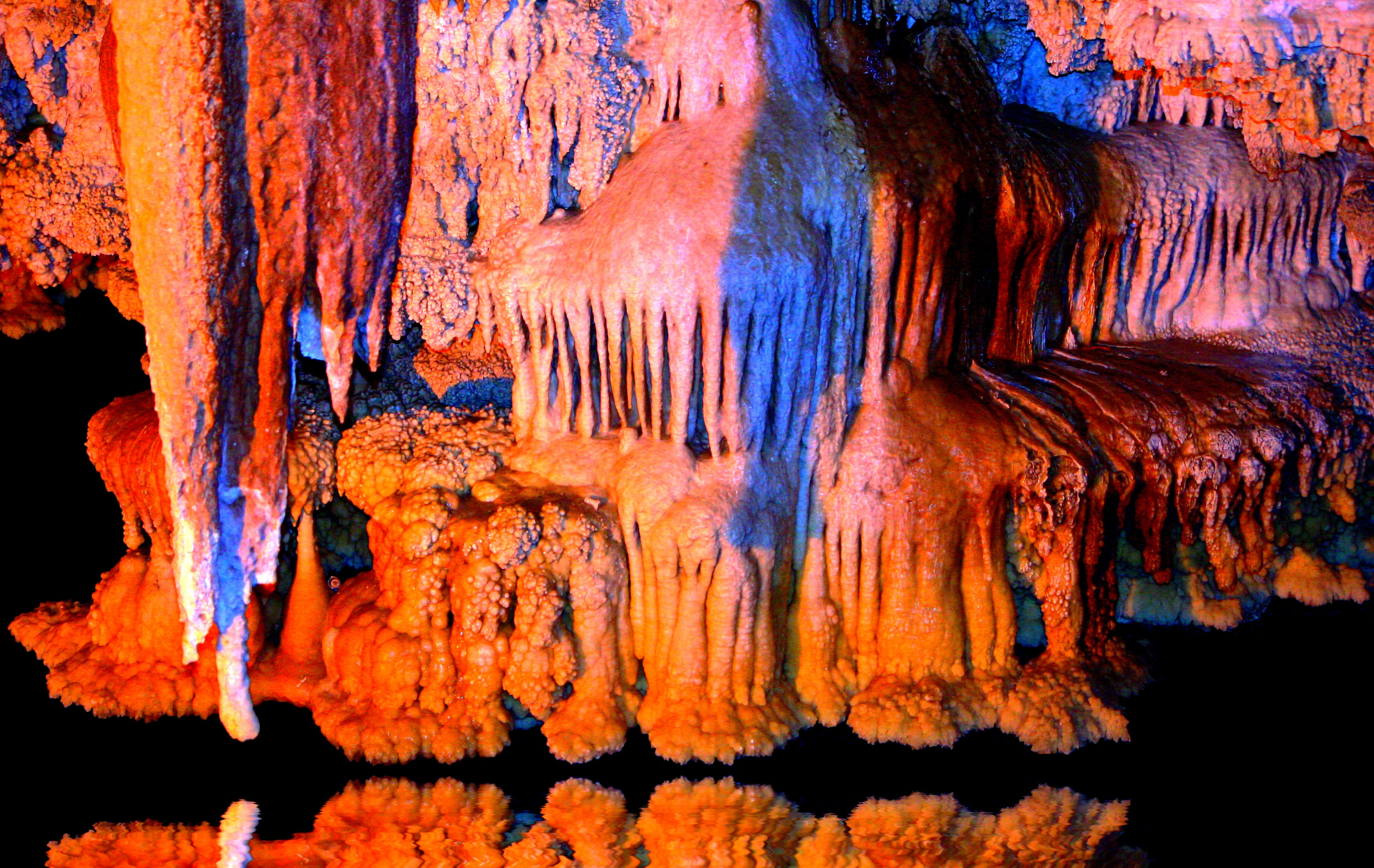
Ali-Sadr Cave

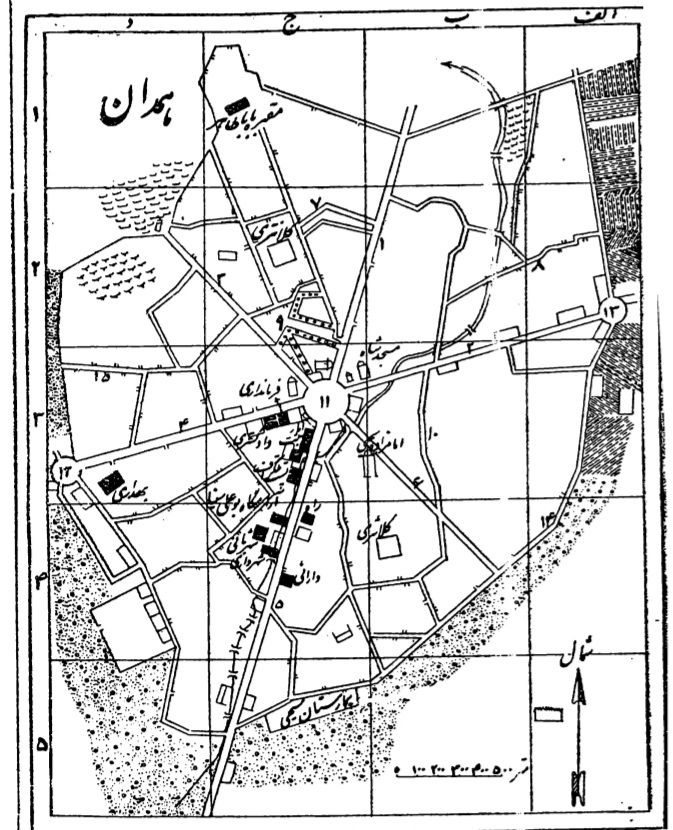
Hamedan map (1330)

== See also ==
- Ganjnameh
- Mir Sayyid Ali Hamadani
- Baba Tahir
- Ali-Sadr Cave
- Hamadan International Airport
- Wojtek (bear)

== Bibliography ==
- Bibliography of the history of Hamadan

Preceded by -	Capital of Median Empire; As "Ecbatana"; 678–549 BCE	Succeeded by -
Preceded by -	Capital of Achaemenid Empire (Persia); As "Ecbatana"; Served as Summer Capital; 550–330 BCE	Succeeded by -
Preceded by Isfahan	Capital of Seljuq Empire (Persia) (Western capital); 1118–1194	Succeeded by -
Preceded by Isfahan	Capital of Iran (Persia); 1118–1194	Succeeded by Gurganj
