= Alaviyan Dome =

Mausoleum in Hamadan, Iran

- گنبد علویان
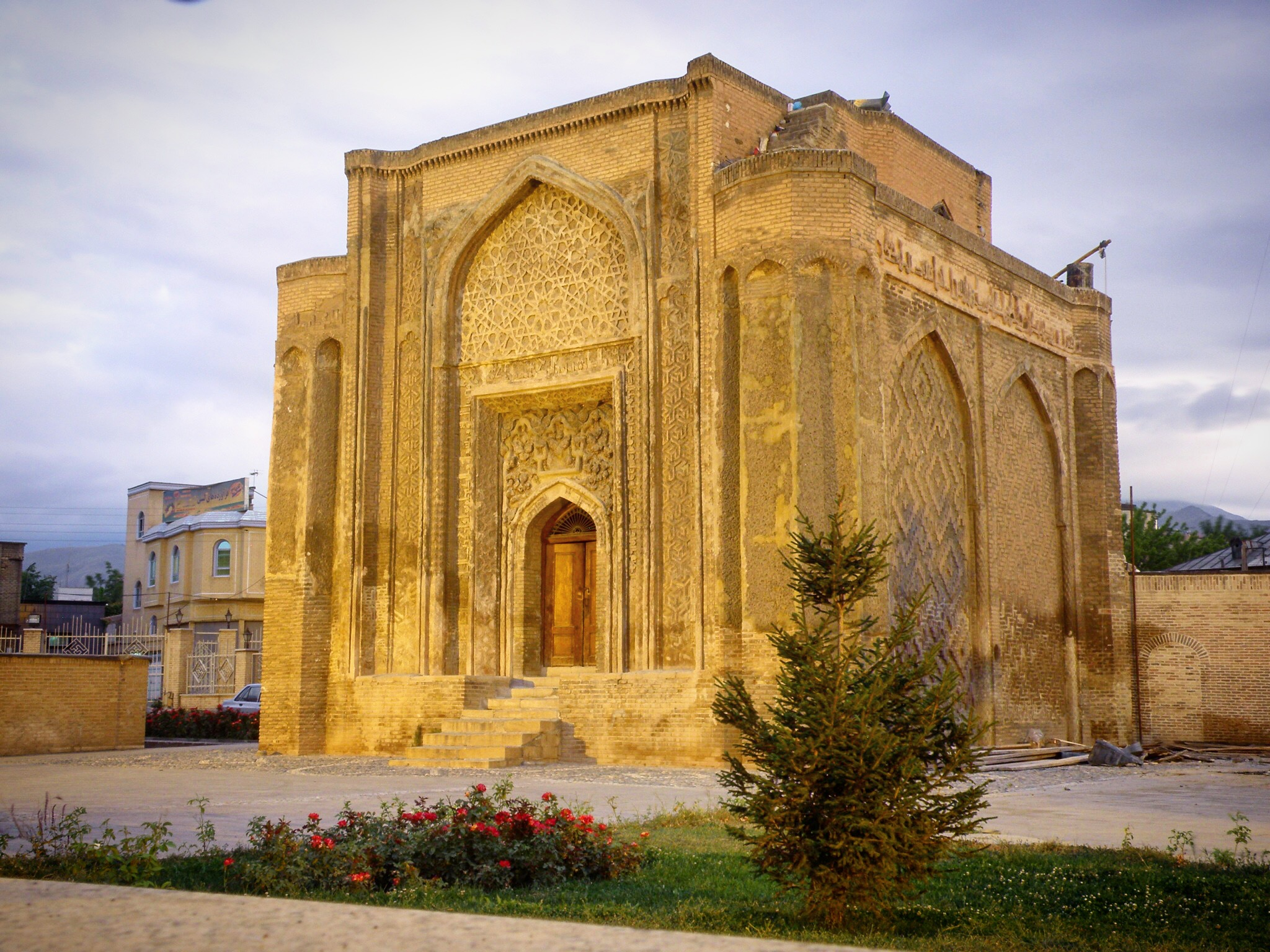

- Location of the mausoleum in Iran

Religion
- Affiliation: Islam
- Ecclesiastical or organisational status: Mausoleum
- Status: Active

Location
- Location: Hamadan, Hamadan province
- Country: Iran
- Interactive map of Alaviyan Dome
- Coordinates: 34°48′13″N 48°30′37″E

Architecture
- Type: Islamic architecture
- Style: Seljuk (possibly); Ilkhanid (possibly)
- Completed: 12th–14th century CE

Specifications
- Length: 12.8 m (42 ft)
- Width: 12.25 m (40.2 ft)
- Height (max): 11.5 m (38 ft)
- Dome: One: since demolished

Iran National Heritage List
- Official name: Alaviyan Mausoleum
- Type: Mausoleum
- Designated: 1932
- Reference no.: 94
- Conservation organization: Cultural Heritage, Handicrafts and Tourism Organization of Iran

The Alaviyan Dome (Persian: گنبد علویان, pronounced [gonˈbæde ʔælæviːˈjɒːn]) (Note: Also variously known as the Gonbad-e Alaviyan, the Gonbad-e ʿAlawiān, the Gonbad-e Alaviyyan, the Gunbad-i Alaviyyan, the Alaviyyan Dome, the Alaviyan Mausoleum, the Alaviyan Tomb, the Gunbad-i Alaviyan, the Gombad-e Alavian, and the Gunbad-i-Alayivan.) is a mausoleum located in Hamadan, Iran. A green colored dome once decorated the top of the building, as the poet Khaqani refers to the building as "the green dome", but has been destroyed by the passing of time.

The mausoleum was added to the Iran National Heritage List on 6 January 1932, administered by the Cultural Heritage, Handicrafts and Tourism Organization of Iran.

== Architecture ==
This structure is square on both the exterior and the interior. The plan incorporates an unusual stellar flange that protrudes from each exterior corner, rising to a height lower than the main mass. The period of construction is contested, ranging from late-12th century, during the Seljuk era to 14th century Mongol. Donald Wilber estimated that the building was completed in c. 1315 CE. Rich ornamentation covers the exterior; terracotta and stucco form inscriptions, and geometric and brick bonding patterns. The interior is plaster coated, with areas of carved stucco in high relief.

== Gallery ==
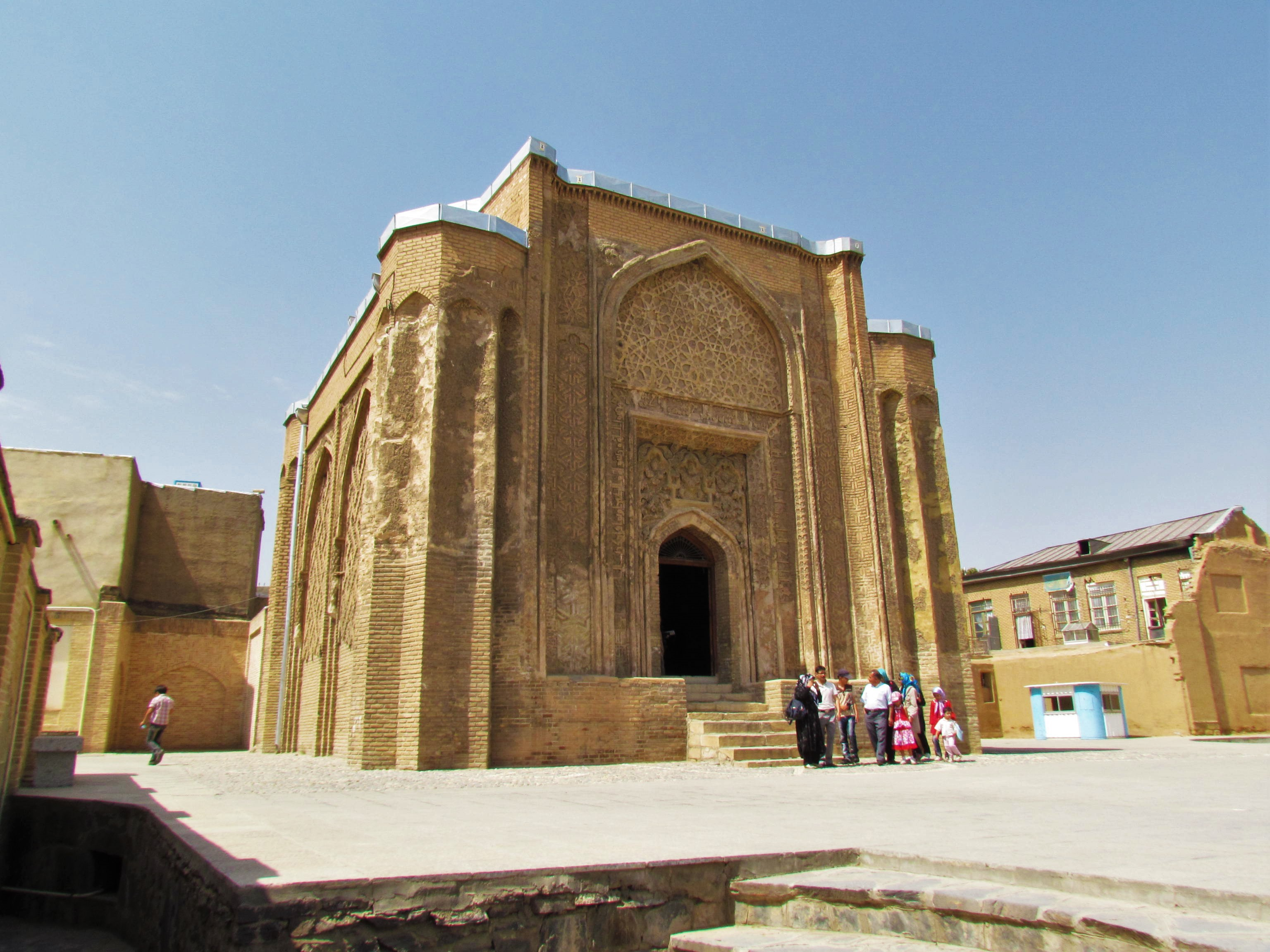

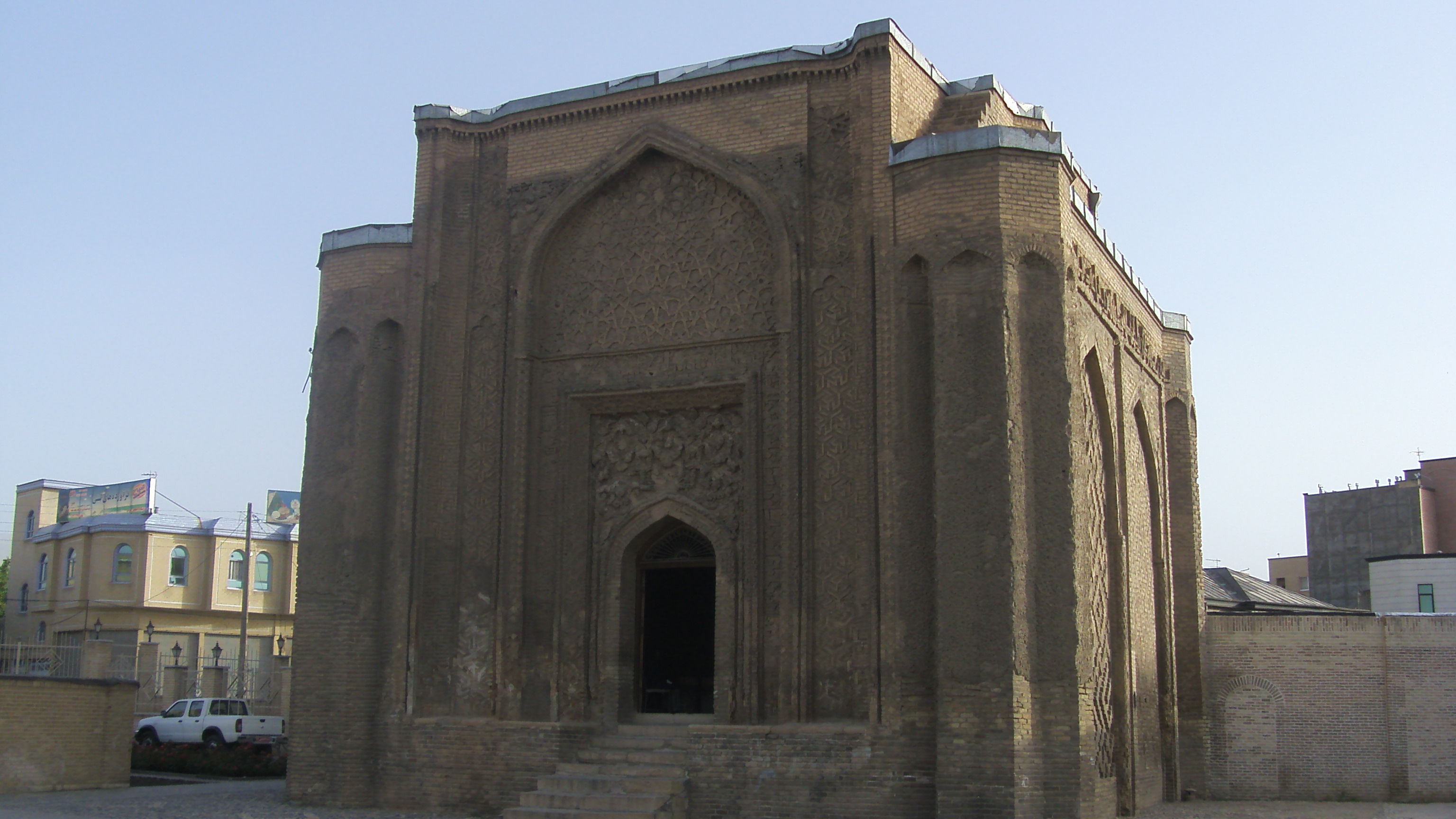

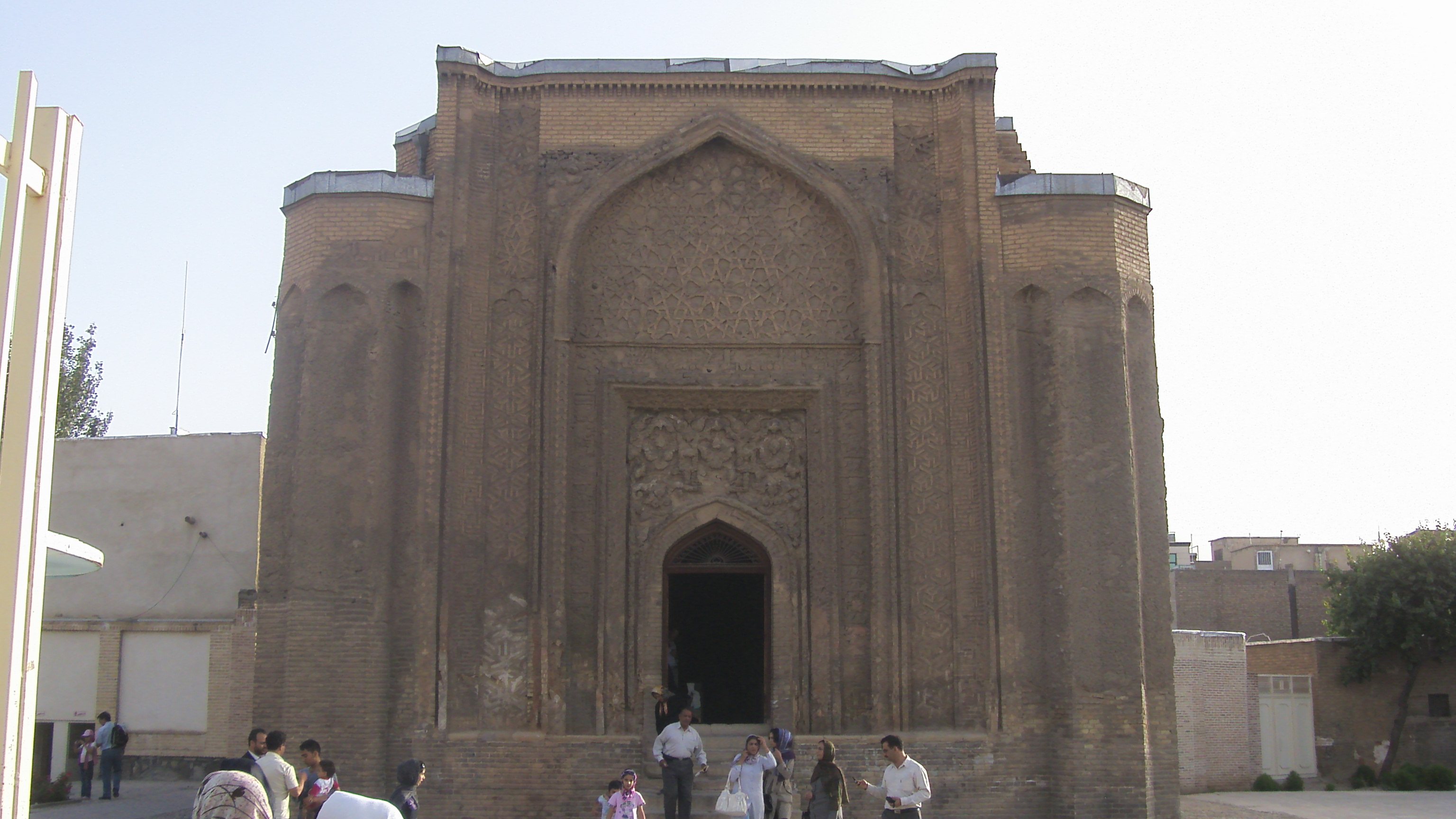

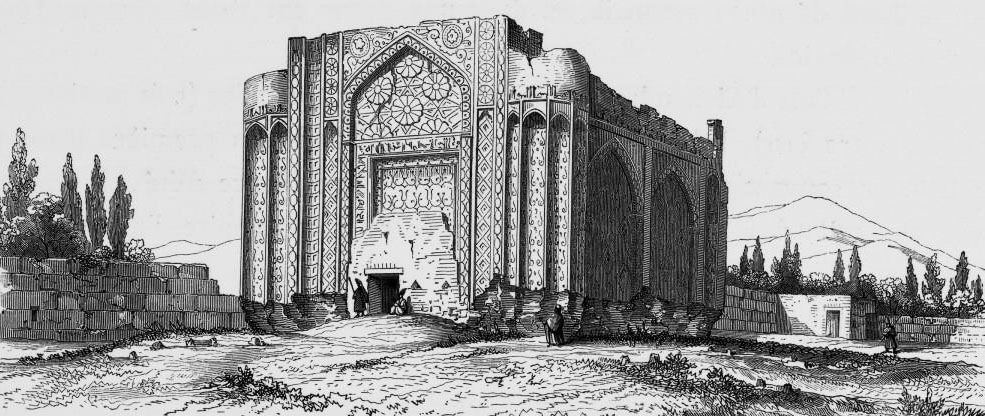

== See also ==
- List of mausoleums in Iran
- List of towers in Iran
- Islam in Iran
