= Shami Kermashani =

Kurdish poet (1927 - 1984)

Shami Kermashani (Kurdish: شامیی کرماشانی, lit. 'Şamî Kirmaşanî',), also known as Shamurad Mushtaq (1927–November 23, 1984), was a famous Kurdish poet from the city of Kermanshah, Iran, also known as Iranian Kurdistan. He has composed most of his poems in Southern Kurdish dialect. He became blind at the age of four because of smallpox.
