= Amir Nosrat'ollah Balakhanlou =

Iranian politician (1917–2007)

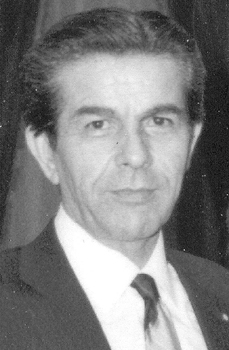

1st Publicly Elected Mayor of Hamedan
- In office 1950–1960

Personal details
- Born: 1917 Tehran, Iran
- Died: May 20, 2007 (aged 89–90)
- Spouse: Fereshteh Abbaspour

Amir Nosrat'ollah Balakhanlou (Persian: اميرنصرت الله بالاخانلو) (1917 – May 20, 2007) was an Iranian (Persian) politician. Born in Tehran, he served as a two-time Mayor and MP for Hamedan in 1950s and early 1960s.

== Biography ==
Amir Nosrat'ollah Balakhanlou was born in Tehran, Iran. He was one of the two sons of Commander Asad Khan of Talesh. His maternal grandfather, Mirza Mahmud Ehtesham ol-Saltaneh, was the Iranian ambassador to Russia, and was the President of the Majlis in the early 1900s. Ehtesham ol-Saltaneh was also one of the founding fathers of the Iranian Constitution during the Qajar dynasty.

As a young man, Amir N. Balakhanlou completed his higher education and his military service in the Royal Air Force Academy of Iran. In the mid-1950s, he served as the first publicly elected mayor of Hamedan. He continued to serve a second term as the mayor, and in the early 1960s, became the MP from Hamedan in Iran's twenty-first (21st) round of Parliament (Majlis of Iran).
