= Habibollah Hedayat =

Iranian physician and nutritionist (1917–2013)

- حبیب الله هدایت
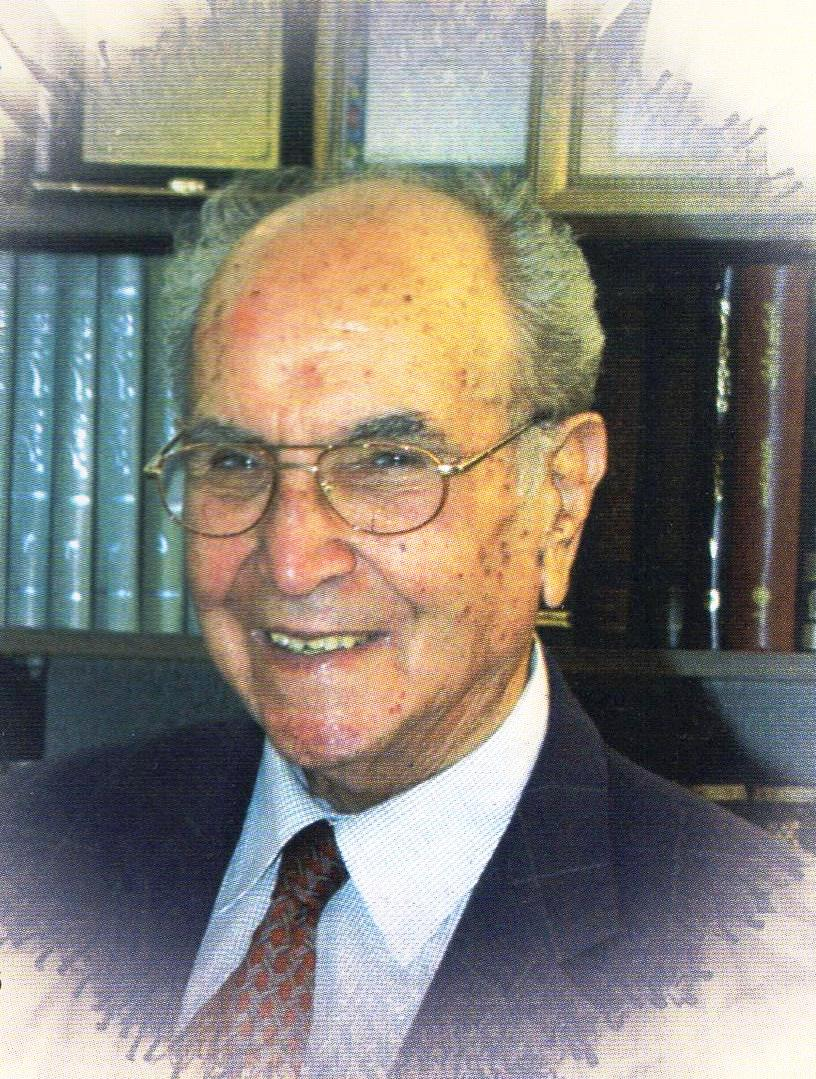
- Habibollah Hedayat in 2006
- Born: 1917; Shahreza, Sublime State of Iran
- Died: 17 October 2013 (aged 93)
- Citizenship: Iran
- Education: Tehran University Medical School, University of Paris, University of London
- Scientific career
- Fields: Nutrition science, Physician
- Workplaces: Institute of Nutrition and Food Science of Iran, Esfahan University, Azad University
- Doctoral advisor: Professor Varangot, Professor Colin B.S. Platt

Habibollah Hedayat (Persian: حبیب الله هدایت; 2013–1917), known as the father of modern nutrition sciences of Iran, was the founder of the National Nutrition and Food Technology Research Institute (NNFTRI) and Faculty of Nutrition and Food Science (FNFS) in Iran.

== Early life and education ==
Habibollah Hedayat was born in the city of Shahreza (previously Ghomsheh) near Esfahan, Iran in 1917. His early education was completed in Shahreza, and he received his high school diploma in Esfahan. Hedayat was then admitted to Tehran University Medical School in 1936 where he finished his medical education with honors in 1941. Upon finishing his medical internship in Tehran's Women's Hospital, he performed his military service for one year in the Iranian Army Health Services and then departed for France in 1948 to attend medical school at the University of Paris. He completed his thesis under Professor Varangot at the Port-Royal Paris Hospital where he received his OB/GYN specialty diploma. While studying courses in his specialization of gynecology, he also took general hygiene and workers’ medicine courses in the evenings with the hope of establishing a hygiene research institute back in Iran.

== Career and Services ==
Upon returning from France to Iran in 1951, Hedayat and his colleagues established the Hafez specialty clinic in Tehran which remained open until 1953. After long discussions with the then Minister of Health, Jahanshah Saleh, Hedayat obtained approval for a research project on Iran's workers’ health. As part of this research project, Hedayat observed malnourished Iranian girls weaving carpets in Kerman in poor working conditions and this caused an internal revolution in him. He decided to focus on "nutrition" as the vital factor in the health and wellbeing of the Iranian people – a subject not taken seriously by the medical community at the time.

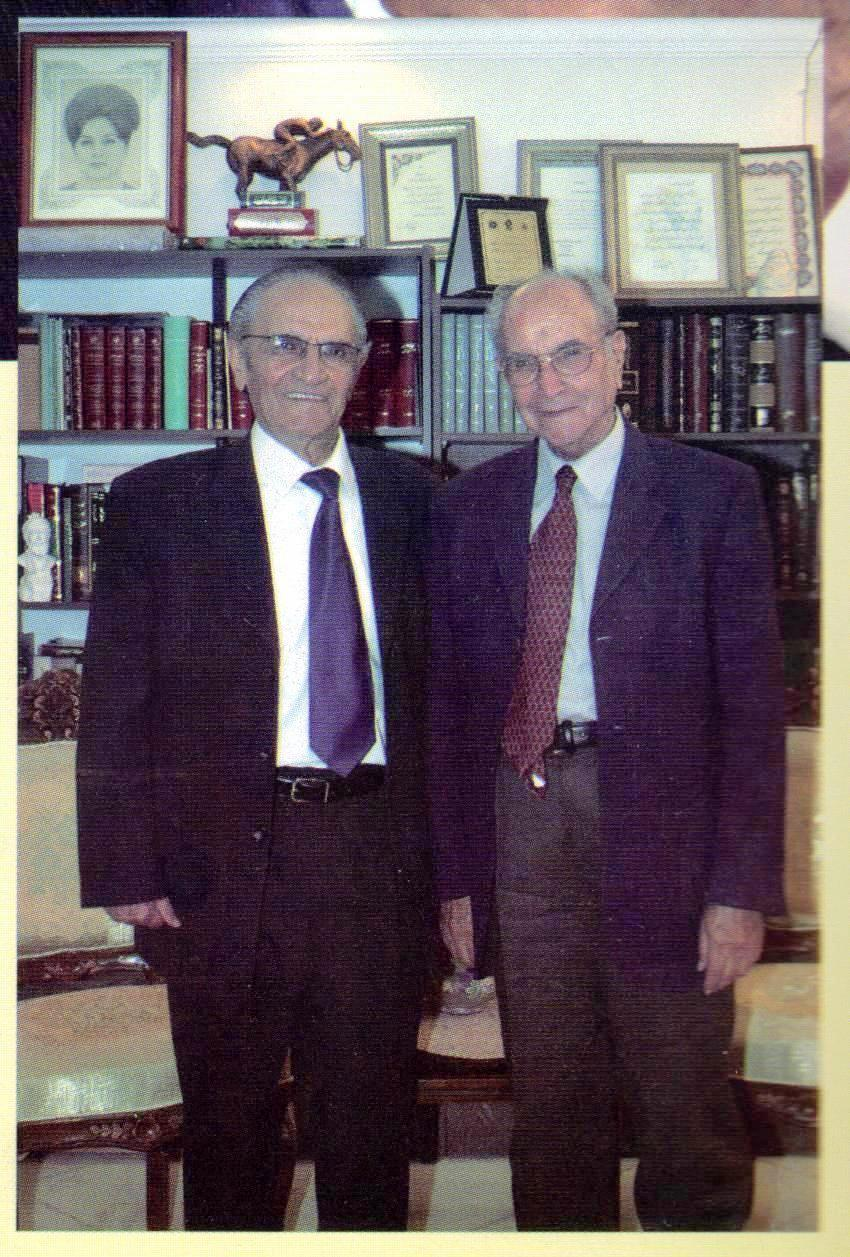
Hedayat (right) with his long-time colleague and friend, Vaez Zadeh (2006)

Since neither he, nor his colleagues in Iran, had formally studied or specialized in the field of nutrition, Hedayat decided to study nutrition sciences overseas under Professor Colin B.S. Platt (professor of nutrition and president of Human Research Centre) at the London School of Hygiene and Tropical Medicine (University of London) as well as the Medical Research Council. Hedayat's master thesis in nutrition was entitled: "A Study of Nutrition in Persia, Including a Laboratory Investigation of the Nutritive Value of Typical Dietaries."

Upon his second return to Iran in 1961, Hedayat was appointed director general of Health Affairs for the Tehran province. It was during this period in his career that he established the Institute of Nutrition and Food Science of Iran (INFSI). The initiative started with modestly sized classes, few laboratories, and a library at the Firouzgar hospital in Tehran. The name of the institute was later changed to National Nutrition & Food Technology Research Institute (NNFTRI).

It was during the establishment of INFSI that Hedayat became acquainted with his long-time colleague and friend, Shahab Vaez Zadeh. These two scientists pledged to work together to make the INFSI, a vital necessity for Iran, into a success.

The institute, in collaboration with the nutrition section at the Embassy of France under the auspices of Professor Trémolières, organized seminars and conferences and granted scholarships to students interested in the field. The institute was to soon find international fame. United Nations entities such as Food and Agriculture Organization (FAO), World Health Organization (WHO), and UNICEF started supporting the institute. These organizations provided 28 academic scholarships for staff and students. Hedayat was invited to a UNICEF conference in New York, where Sir Herbert Broadley, the former acting director-general of FAO and UNICEF's representative in Great Britain, indicated that establishment of the Institute of Nutrition and Food Science in Iran had inspired several other Middle Eastern countries to follow suit and establish similar institutes in their respective countries. As an integral part of the institute, Iran's College of Nutrition Sciences and Food Chemistry was established. Additionally, a rural research center was established in Gorg-Tapeh, a rural area in Varamin, near Tehran. Later, in cooperation with Abdolrahim Emami, who had been sent by Hedayat to London to receive his specialty under supervision of Prof. Platt, a branch of the Nutrition Institute was established at the Esfahan University in Esfahan, Iran. In 1970, the Iranian Diabetes Society was also established with Hedayat as a founding member and chairman of the board.

== Scientific Works ==
Hedayat is author or co-author of six books, thirty-three academic papers, over fifty research reports on food and nutrition, and over one hundred presentations at national and international conferences (in Persian, English, and French). He was the founder and editor-in-chief of the Nutrition Journal published in Persian by NNFTRI. He was also a member of the editorial board of Ecology of Food and Nutrition published in English in London, Washington, and Tokyo. One of his major scientific achievements was overseeing the evaluation of the nutritional status and needs of the Iranian people conducted by survey teams in 30 different urban, rural, tribal and industrial locations. The result of this survey (published in Persian and English) which was reported to FAO, was considered as the most reputable nutritional survey in the third world and used as a reference for developing countries. Hedayat also managed research projects on Favism and Endemic Goiter in Iran.

== Honors and awards ==
Hedayat's pioneering work in nutrition sciences over the past 50 years, inspired by his humanistic values and views, has been recognized by the Iranian academic community, industry and governmental organizations as well as international food and nutrition authorities. A significant number of Iran's current leaders in nutrition and food sciences are alumni of the college he established, the College of Nutrition Sciences and Food Chemistry. In 2005, Hedayat was elected as a member of the distinguished faculty of the College of Food Technology of Scientific Research Unit, part of Islamic Azad University. In 2006, Dr. Hedayat (together with Shahab Vaez-Zadeh) was officially recognized for his pioneering work in nutrition and food science by all sectors of the Iranian society, including Ayatollah Hashemi Rafsanjani, former president and chairman of the Expediency Discernment Council of Iran. Dr. Hedayat's lasting legacy is manifested by the "Dr. Hedayat Award", the highest award in Iran bestowed annually by the Iranian Food Science and Technology Association (chairman: Seyed Mohammad Hosseini) to the most achieved Iranian persons or institutions in the field of nutrition and food science. In 2008, dozens of his former students gathered together with him in Los Angeles to celebrate with him his myriad lifetime achievements.
