= Adib al-Mamalek Farahani =

Iranian poet and journalist of the Qajar era

- ادیب‌الممالک فراهانی
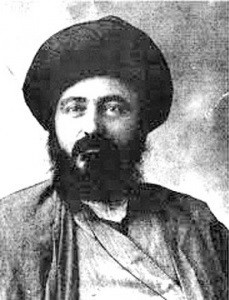
- Born: Mohammad-Sādeq; 1860; Gazeran, Qajar Iran
- Died: 21 February 1917 (aged 56–57); Tehran, Qajar Iran
- Occupations: Poet, journalist
- Spouse: Ehterām ol-Siyādeh Qā'em-Maqāmi
- Writing career
- Language: Persian

Adib al-Mamalek Farahani (Persian: ادیب‌الممالک فراهانی; 1860 – 21 February 1917), née Mohammad-Sādeq Farāhāni (محمدصادق فراهانی), also known as Amīr osh-Sho'arā (امیرالشعرا; lit. King of poets) was an Iranian poet and journalist during the late Qajar era.

He was awarded the title Adib al-Mamalek by Mozaffar al-Din Shah in recognition of his literary talent and growing fame as a poet.

== Sources ==
- Keyvani, Majd al-Din (2022). "ادیب الممالک". The Great Islamic Encyclopaedia (in Persian).
- Rahman, Munibur (2020). "Adīb-al-mamālek Farāhānī". Encyclopaedia Iranica Online. Brill.
- Aryan-Pur, Yahya (1978). از صبا تا نیما [From Saba to Nima] (in Persian). Franklin Book Program.
