= Volleyball at the 2015 Pan American Games – Women's volleyball team squads =

This article shows the rosters of all participating teams at the women's Volleyball tournament at the 2015 Pan American Games in Toronto. Rosters can have a maximum of 12 athletes.

== Argentina ==
The Argentina indoor volleyball women's team consists of the following players:

- Natalia Aispurúa
- Leticia Boscacci
- Yael Castiglione
- Antonela Curatola
- Josefina Fernández
- Lucia Fresco
- Julieta Lazcano
- Yamila Nizetich
- Sol Piccolo
- Tatiana Rizzo
- Elina Rodríguez
- Emilce Sosa

Sources: FeVA, Toronto 2015

== Brazil ==
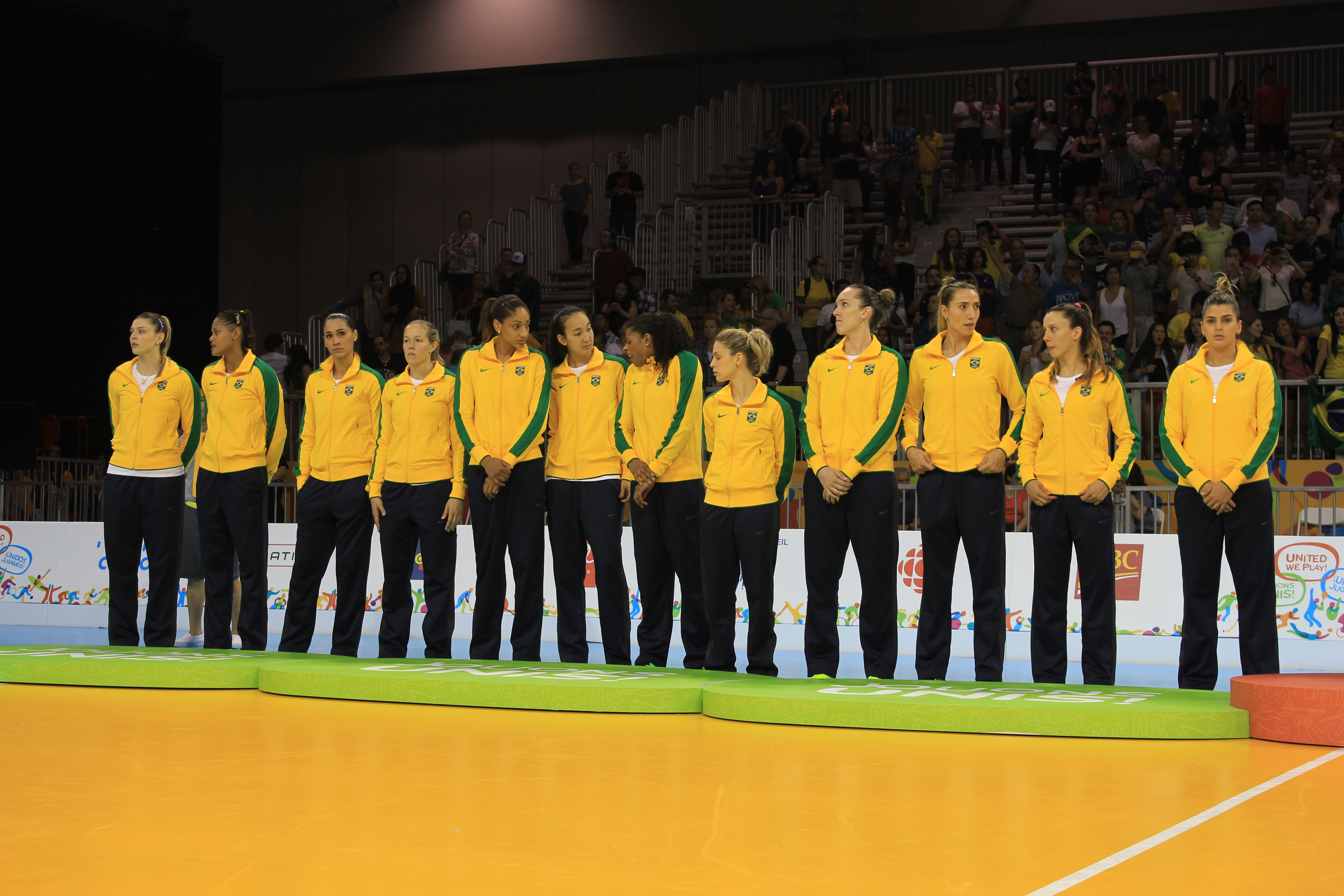
Team Brazil

Brazil announced their squad on July 9, 2015.

- Rosamaria Montibeller #1
- Adenízia da Silva #5
- Jaqueline Carvalho #8
- Michelle Pavão #9
- Joyce da Silva #11
- Ana Tiemi #14
- Fernanda Garay #16
- Camila Brait #18
- Angélica Malinverno #21
- Mariana Costa #22 / 25
- Bárbara Brunch #23
- Macris Carneiro #24

== Canada ==
Canada announced their squad on June 18, 2015.

- Tesca Andrew-Wasylik
- Lisa Barclay
- Lucy Charuk
- Dana Cranston
- Marisa Field
- Tabitha Love
- Jennifer Lundqvist
- Shanice Marcelle
- Brittney Page
- Kyla Richey
- Danielle Smith
- Jaimie Thibeault

== Cuba ==
The Cuban indoor volleyball women's team consists of the following players:

- Regla Gracia
- Alena Rojas
- Melissa Vargas
- Yamila Hernández
- Daymara Lescay
- Emily Borrell
- Gretell Moreno
- Dayamí Sánchez
- Beatriz Vílchez
- Heidy Casanova
- Sulian Matienzo
- Jennifer Álvarez

== Dominican Republic ==
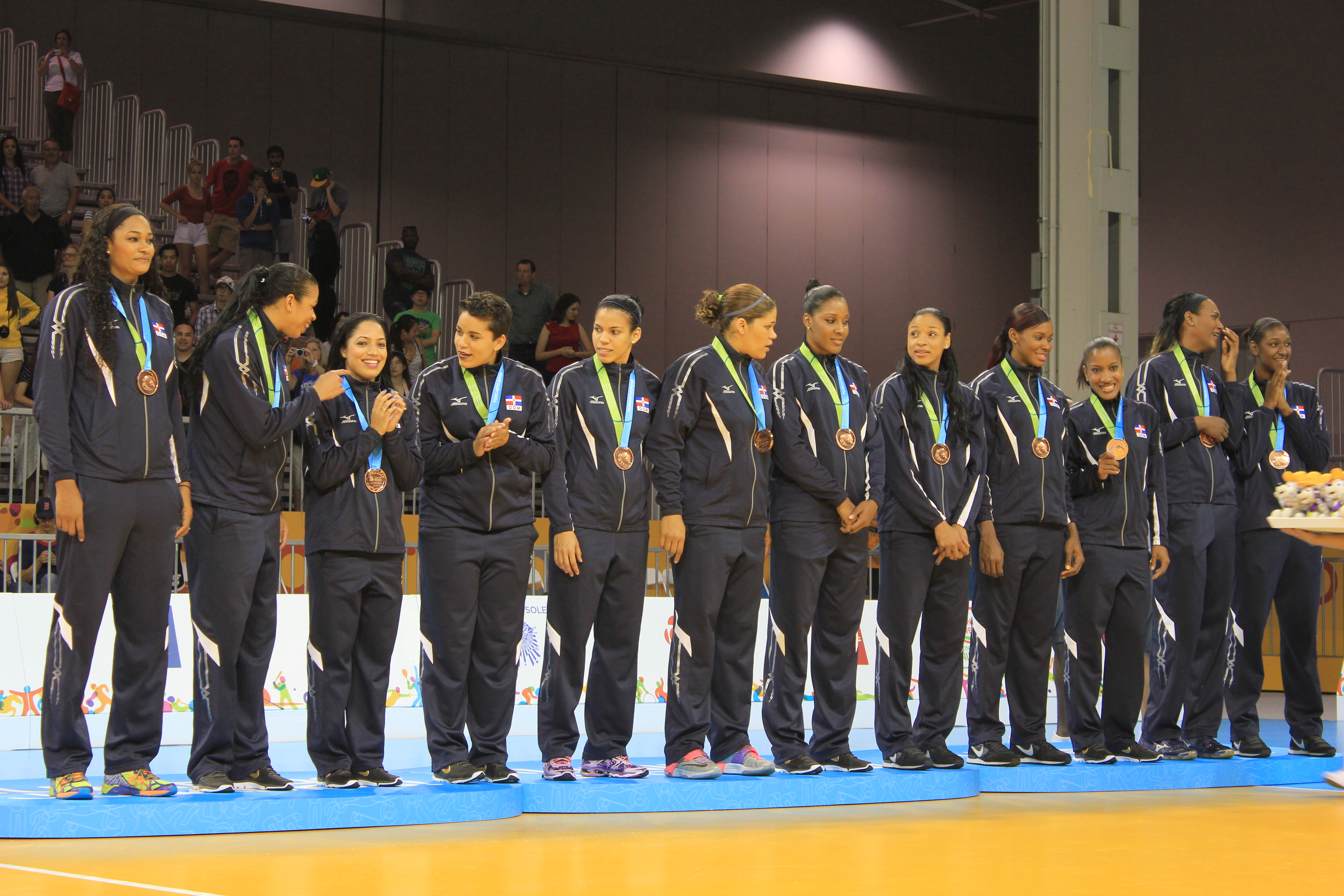
Team Dominican Republic

The Dominican Republic indoor volleyball women's team consists of the following players:

- Annerys Vargas #1
- Marianne Fersola #4
- Brenda Castillo #5
- Camil Domínguez #6
- Niverka Marte #7
- Prisilla Rivera #14
- Yonkaira Peña #16
- Gina Mambru #17
- Bethania de la Cruz #18
- Ana Binet #19
- Brayelin Martínez #20
- Jineiry Martínez #21

== Peru ==
The Peruvian indoor volleyball women's team consists of the following players:

- Mirtha Uribe
- Carla Rueda
- Brenda Uribe
- Shiamara Almeyda
- Alexandra Muñoz
- Susan Egoavil
- Maguilaura Frias
- Clarivett Yllescas
- Ángela Leyva
- Ginna López
- Andrea Urrutia
- Katherine Regalado

== Puerto Rico ==
Puerto Rico participated with the following squad:

- Debora Seilhamer #1
- Vilmarie Mojica #3
- Yarimar Rosa #6
- Stephanie Enright #7
- Aurea Cruz #9
- Shirley Ferrer #13
- Karina Ocasio #11
- Natalia Valentin #14
- Alexandra Oquendo #16
- Sheila Ocasio #17 /21
- Lynda Morales #18
- Nayka Benítez #13

== United States ==
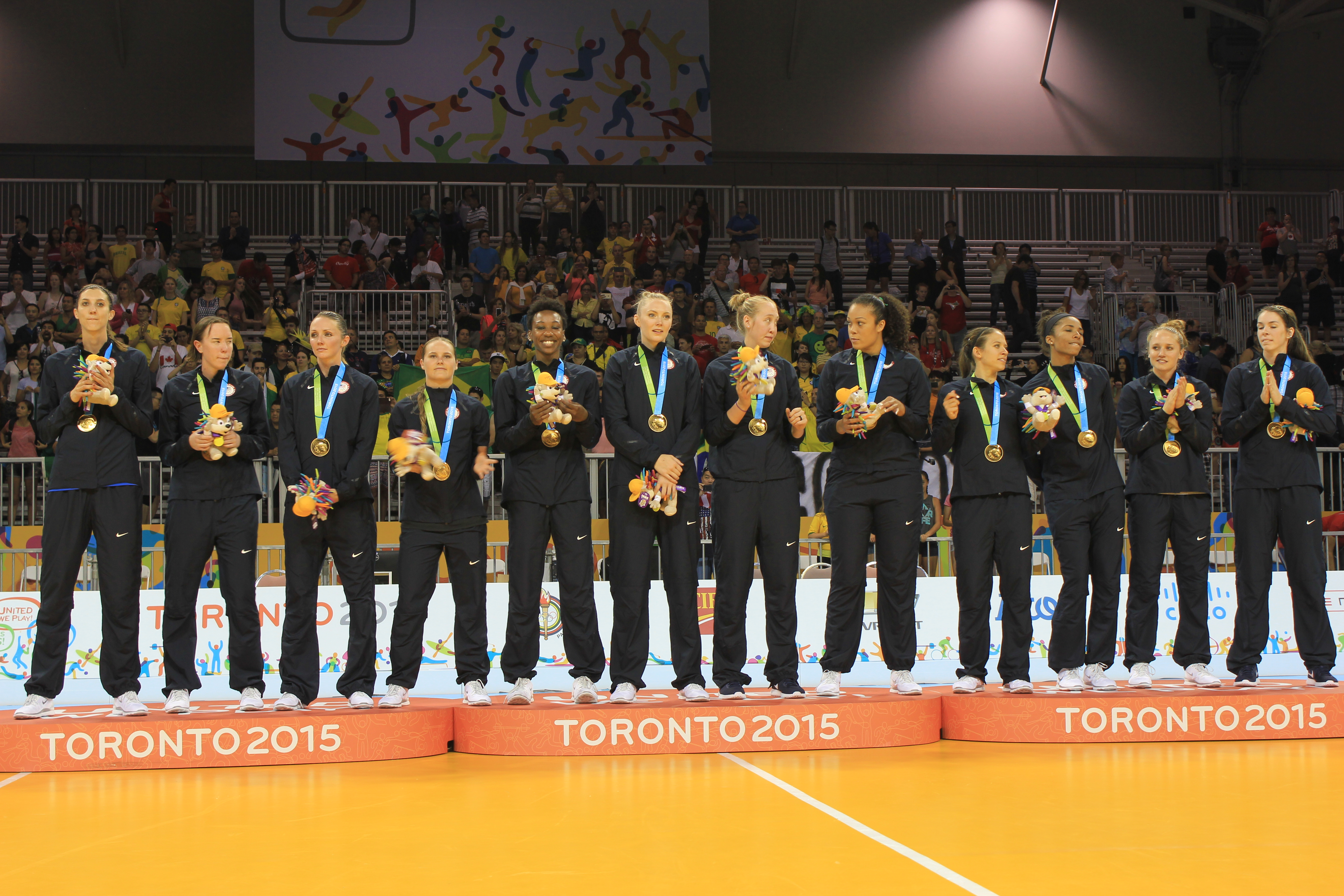
Team USA

The United States announced their squad on July 16, 2015.

- Lauren Paolini #4
- Cassidy Lichtman #7
- Kristin Hildebrand #9
- Natalie Hagglund #10
- Nicole Fawcett #14
- Cursty Jackson #13
- Michelle Bartsch #16
- Falyn Fonoimoana #17
- Jenna Hagglund #20
- Rachael Adams #22
- Carli Lloyd #23
- Krista Vansant #24
