= 4x4 beach volleyball at the 2019 World Beach Games – Men's tournament =

2019 Men's 4x4 beach volleyball tournament at the World Beach Games
Tournament details
- Host country: Qatar
- City: Doha
- Dates: 12–16 October
- Teams: 8
- Venue: 1

Final positions
- Champions: {{country data United States | flag link/core | variant = | size = | name = | altlink = men's national volleyball team | altvar = volleyball | mw = men's }} (1st title)
- Runners-up: {{country data Qatar | flag link/core | variant = | size = | name = | altlink = men's national volleyball team | altvar = volleyball | mw = men's }}
- Third place: {{country data Indonesia | flag link/core | variant = | size = | name = | altlink = men's national volleyball team | altvar = volleyball | mw = men's }}
- Fourth place: {{country data Poland | flag link/core | variant = | size = | name = | altlink = men's national volleyball team | altvar = volleyball | mw = men's }}

The men's 4x4 beach volleyball tournament at the 2019 World Beach Games in Doha, Qatar, the inaugural edition of the ANOC World Beach Games, will take place over five days from 12 to 16 October 2019. Held in tandem with the women's tournament, the two events comprise the 4x4 beach volleyball competition at this year's Games.

Organised by the Association of National Olympic Committees (ANOC), national associations of FIVB (4x4 beach volleyball's governing body) from a territory with a National Olympic Committee (NOC) were invited to enter one team from which 8 teams.

The tournament is a multi-stage competition, consisting of a round-robin group stage and followed by a single elimination knockout round, starting with the semi-finals and ending with the gold medal match.

== Competition schedule ==
The tournament began on 12 October, after the opening ceremony, and ended on the final day of the Games, 16 October.

Matches deciding medal winners took place exclusively on 16 October.

G	Group stage	QF	Quarter-finals	SF	Semi-finals	B	Bronze medal match	F	Final / Gold medal match

Sat 12	Sun 13	Mon 14	Tue 15	Wed 16	
G	G	QF	SF	B	F

== Qualified teams ==
Each National Olympic Committee might enter up to one men's and one women's team in the 4x4 beach volleyball tournaments. The qualification processes for the men's and women's events were similar. The host country was guaranteed an entry in each event. The five spots were awarded to the best FIVB Beach Volleyball World Rankings for each continental federation. 2 more spots were awarded to invitation (wild card) process.

Mean of qualification	Date	Host	Vacancies	Qualified
Host nation	14 June 2019	(Switzerland) Lausanne	1	Qatar
World Ranking for African Team	30 June 2019	(Switzerland) Lausanne	1	Mozambique
World Ranking for Asian Team	30 June 2019	(Switzerland) Lausanne	1	Australia
World Ranking for European Team	30 June 2019	(Switzerland) Lausanne	1	United States
World Ranking for North American Team	30 June 2019	(Switzerland) Lausanne	1	Poland
World Ranking for South American Team	30 June 2019	(Switzerland) Lausanne	1	Chile
Invitation process	n/a	(Switzerland) Lausanne	2	Germany Indonesia
Total			8	

== Venues ==
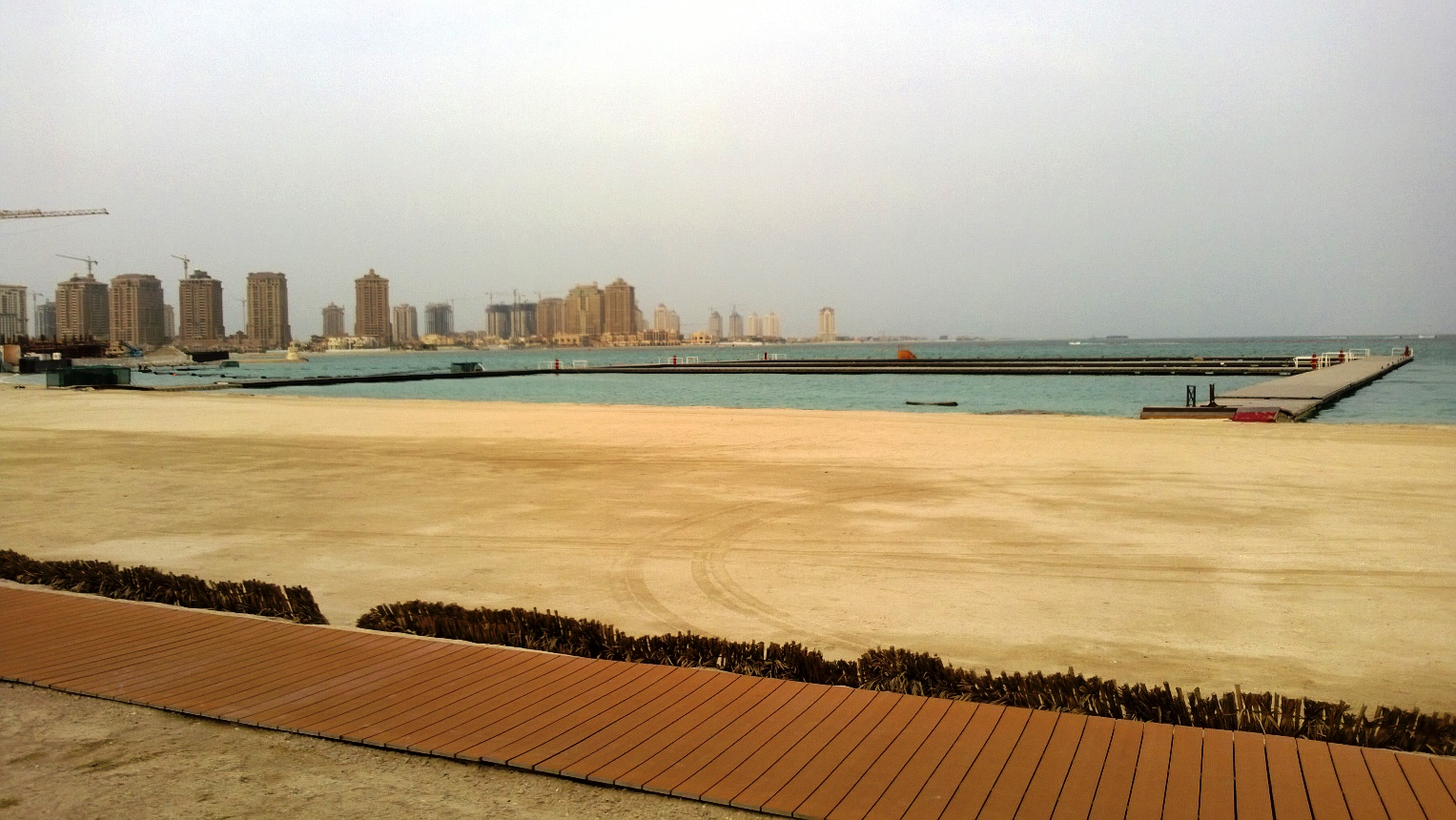
Katara Beach, Doha

The matches will be held on the Katara Beach.

== Squads ==
Each team may enter a squad consisting of up to 6 players. A total of up to 48 athletes are expected to compete.

== Pools composition ==
Teams were seeded in the first two positions of each pool following the Serpentine system according to their FIVB Beach Volleyball World Rankings as of 30 June 2019. FIVB reserved the right to seed the hosts as heads of pool A regardless of the World Ranking.

Pool A	Pool B
Qatar (H)	Poland (1)
Germany (3)	Chile (2)
United States (4)	Australia (5)
Indonesia (7)	Mozambique (6)

== Pool standing procedure ==
1. Match points (2 for the winner, 1 for the loser, 0 for forfeit)
2. Between 2 teams consider all teams points ratio / Between 3 teams consider head-to-head points ratio
3. Seeding position of the pools composition

== Preliminary round ==
- All times are Arabia Standard Time (UTC+03:00).

=== Pool A ===
Pos	Team	Pld	W	L	Pts	SW	SL	SR	SPW	SPL	SPR	Qualification
1	Qatar	3	3	0	6	6	2	3.000	146	113	1.292	Quarter-finals
2	United States	3	1	2	4	4	4	1.000	138	141	0.979	Quarter-finals
3	Germany	3	1	2	4	3	5	0.600	137	150	0.913	Quarter-finals
4	Indonesia	3	1	2	4	3	5	0.600	133	150	0.887	Quarter-finals

Source: WBG 2019

12 October 2019; 16:00	Qatar	2-1	Indonesia	Main court, Katara beach
12 October 2019; 16:00	16-21, 21-14, 15-4; Report			Main court, Katara beach

12 October 2019; 16:00	Germany	2-1	United States	Field 1, Katara beach
12 October 2019; 16:00	21-19, 14-21, 15-13; Report			Field 1, Katara beach

13 October 2019; 17:00	United States	1-2	Qatar	Main court, Katara beach
13 October 2019; 17:00	21-16, 10-21, 10-15; Report			Main court, Katara beach

13 October 2019; 17:00	Germany	1-2	Indonesia	Field 1, Katara beach
13 October 2019; 17:00	19-21, 21-18, 14-16; Report			Field 1, Katara beach

13 October 2019; 21:00	Qatar	2-0	Germany	Main court, Katara beach
13 October 2019; 21:00	21-18, 21-15; Report			Main court, Katara beach

13 October 2019; 21:00	Indonesia	0-2	United States	Field 1, Katara beach
13 October 2019; 21:00	18-21, 21-23; Report			Field 1, Katara beach

=== Pool B ===
Pos	Team	Pld	W	L	Pts	SW	SL	SR	SPW	SPL	SPR	Qualification
1	Australia	3	2	1	5	5	2	2.500	134	119	1.126	Quarter-finals
2	Poland	3	2	1	5	4	2	2.000	125	119	1.050	Quarter-finals
3	Mozambique	3	1	2	4	2	5	0.400	131	137	0.956	Quarter-finals
4	Chile	3	1	2	4	2	4	0.500	105	120	0.875	Quarter-finals

Source: WBG 2019

12 October 2019; 17:00	Chile	0-2	Australia	Main court, Katara beach
12 October 2019; 17:00	14-21, 17-21; Report			Main court, Katara beach

12 October 2019; 17:00	Poland	2-0	Mozambique	Field 1, Katara beach
12 October 2019; 17:00	23-21, 24-22; Report			Field 1, Katara beach

13 October 2019; 19:00	Chile	2-0	Mozambique	Main court, Katara beach
13 October 2019; 19:00	21-17, 21-19; Report			Main court, Katara beach

13 October 2019; 19:00	Australia	2-0	Poland	Field 1, Katara beach
13 October 2019; 19:00	23-21, 21-15; Report			Field 1, Katara beach

13 October 2019; 23:00	Poland	2-0	Chile	Main court, Katara beach
13 October 2019; 23:00	21-19, 21-13; Report			Main court, Katara beach

13 October 2019; 23:00	Mozambique	2-1	Australia	Field 1, Katara beach
13 October 2019; 23:00	16-21, 21-16, 15-11; Report			Field 1, Katara beach

== Knockout stage ==
- All times are Arabia Standard Time (UTC+03:00).

Quarter-finals
Australia	1
Indonesia	2
United States	2
Mozambique	0
Qatar	2
Chile	0
Poland	2
Germany	0

Semi-finals
United States	2
Indonesia	0
Poland	0
Qatar	2

Final
United States	2
Qatar	0
Bronze medal match
Indonesia	2
Poland	1

=== Quarter-finals ===
14 October 2019; 19:00	Australia	1-2	Indonesia	Main court, Katara beach

14 October 2019; 19:00	United States	2-0	Mozambique	Field 1, Katara beach

14 October 2019; 20:00	Qatar	2-0	Chile	Main court, Katara beach

14 October 2019; 20:00	Poland	2-0	Germany	Field 1, Katara beach

=== Semi-finals ===
15 October 2019; 18:00	United States	2-0	Indonesia	Main court, Katara beach

15 October 2019; 19:00	Poland	0-2	Qatar	Main court, Katara beach

=== Bronze medal game ===
16 October 2019; 17:00	Indonesia	2-1	Poland	Main court, Katara beach

=== Gold medal game ===
16 October 2019; 19:30	United States	2-0	Qatar	Main court, Katara beach

== Final ranking ==
Rank	Team
1	United States
2	Qatar
3	Indonesia
4	Poland
5	Australia
5	Mozambique
5	Chile
5	Germany

== See also ==
- 4x4 beach volleyball at the 2019 World Beach Games – Women's tournament
