= Australia at the 2019 World Beach Games =

- Flag of Australia
- IOC code: AUS

in Doha, Qatar 12 October 2019 – 16 October 2019
- Competitors: 40 (20 men and 20 women) in 7 sports
- Medals Ranked 23rd: Gold 0 Silver 1 Bronze 0 Total 1

World Beach Games appearances
- 2019; 2023

Australia competed at the inaugural World Beach Games in Doha, Qatar from 12 to 16 October 2019. In total, athletes representing Australia won one silver medal and the country finished in 23rd place in the medal table.

== Medal summary ==
Medals by sport
Sport	1st place, gold medalist(s)	2nd place, silver medalist(s)	3rd place, bronze medalist(s)	Total
Waterskiing	0	1	0	1

=== Medalists ===
Medal	Name	Sport	Event
Silver	Cory Teunissen	Waterskiing	Men's wakeboarding

== Competitors ==
The following is the list of number of competitors in the Games.

Sport	Men	Women	Total
Beach handball	10	10	20
4x4 beach volleyball	6	5	11
Bouldering	1	1	2
Karate kata	1	1	2
Kiteboarding	0	2	2
Open water swimming	1	1	2
Waterski	1	0	1
Total	20	20	40

== Beach handball ==
Team	Event	Group stage						Quarterfinal	Semifinal	Final / BM	
Team	Event	Opposition Score	Opposition Score	Opposition Score	Opposition Score	Opposition Score	Rank	Opposition Score	Opposition Score	Opposition Score	Rank
Australia men's team	Men's tournament	Sweden; L 0–2 (11–22, 8–28)	Denmark; L 0–2 (20–21, 16–23)	Brazil; L 0–2 (9–27, 12–20)	Oman; W 2–1 (18–19, 20–14, 7–6)	United States; W 2–1 (30–26, 18–28, 9–8)	4	Qatar; L 0–2 (17–24, 14–21)	5–8th place semi-finals Croatia; L 0–2 (20–21, 26–35)	Seventh place game Tunisia; L 1–2 (19–16, 21–28, 14–16)	8
Australia women's team	Women's tournament	Poland; L 0–2 (12–15, 12–19)	Greece; L 0–2 (16–17, 12–22)	China; L 0–2 (13–15, 14–17)	Spain; L 0–2 (11–16, 6–22)	Vietnam; L 0–2 (16–17, 9–26)	6	9–12th place semi-finals United States; L 0–2 (10–22, 15–20)	Eleventh place game Tunisia; W 2–0 (14–13, 13–11)	—	11

== 4x4 beach volleyball ==
Team	Event	Group stage				Quarterfinal	Semifinal	Final / BM	
Team	Event	Opposition Score	Opposition Score	Opposition Score	Rank	Opposition Score	Opposition Score	Opposition Score	Rank
Australia Men's 4x4	Men's tournament	Chile; W 2–0 (21–14, 21–17)	Poland; W 2–0 (23–21, 21–15)	Mozambique; L 1–2 (21–16, 16–21, 11–15)	2	Indonesia; L 1–2 (23–25, 16–21, 9–15)	Did not advance		
Australia women's 4x4	Women's tournament	The Gambia; W 2–0 (21–11, 21–7)	Vanuatu; W 2–0 (21–13, 21–17)	Canada; L 0–2 (18–21, 12–21)	2	Czech Republic; W 2–0 (21–15, 21–14)	Brazil; L 0–2 (10–21, 11–21)	Canada; L 1–2 (21–17, 15–21, 14–16)	4

== Bouldering ==
Athlete	Event	Qualification		Final	
Athlete	Event	Total	Rank	Total	Rank
Campbell Harrison	Men's individual		19	Did not advance	
Oceania Mackenzie	Women's individual		17	Did not advance	

== Karate kata ==
Athlete	Event	Round 1		Round 2		Ranking round		Final / BM	
Athlete	Event	Score	Rank	Score	Rank	Score	Rank	Opposition Result	Rank
Shaun Yuen	Men's individual	23.08	5	Did not advance					
Ionna Sampani	Women's individual	22.88	5	Did not advance					
