= Indonesia at the 2019 World Beach Games =

- Flag of Indonesia
- IOC code: INA

in Doha, Qatar 12 October 2019 – 16 October 2019
- Competitors: 12 (7 men and 5 women) in 3 sports
- Medals Ranked 32nd: Gold 0 Silver 0 Bronze 1 Total 1

World Beach Games appearances
- 2019; 2023

Indonesia competed at the inaugural World Beach Games in Doha, Qatar from 12 to 16 October 2019. In total, athletes representing Indonesia won one bronze medal and the country finished in 32nd place in the medal table.

== Medal summary ==
Medals by sport
Sport	1st place, gold medalist(s)	2nd place, silver medalist(s)	3rd place, bronze medalist(s)	Total
4x4 beach volleyball	0	0	1	1

=== Medalists ===
Medal	Name	Sport	Event
Bronze	I Ketut Ardana; Rendy Verdian Licardo; Yosi Ariel Firnanda; Tio Kesuma Sentosa; Gunawan Dewantoro; Yogi Hermawan	4x4 beach volleyball	Men's tournament

== Competitors ==
The following is the list of number of competitors in the Games.

Sport	Men	Women	Total
3x3 basketball	0	4	4
4x4 beach volleyball	6	0	6
Karate kata	1	1	2
Total	7	5	12

== 3x3 basketball ==
Team	Event	Group stage				Quarterfinal	Semifinal	Final / BM	
Team	Event	Opposition Score	Opposition Score	Opposition Score	Rank	Opposition Score	Opposition Score	Opposition Score	Rank
Indonesia women's 3x3	Women's tournament	Uganda; L 8–12	Togo; W 17–7	China; L 10–21	3	Did not advance			10

Team roster

- Dyah Lestari
- Christie Apriyani
- Dewa Ayu Kusuma
- Jovita Elizabeth

== 4x4 beach volleyball ==
Team	Event	Group stage				Quarterfinal	Semifinal	Final / BM	
Team	Event	Opposition Score	Opposition Score	Opposition Score	Rank	Opposition Score	Opposition Score	Opposition Score	Rank
Indonesia men's 4x4	Men's tournament	Qatar; L 1–2 (21–16, 14–21, 4–15)	Germany; W 2–1 (21–19, 18–21, 16–14)	United States; L 0–2 (18–21, 21–23)	3	Australia; W 2–1 (23–25, 21–16, 15–9)	United States; L 0–2 (15–21, 12–21)	Poland; W 2–1 (21–13, 19–21, 15–11)	3rd place, bronze medalist(s)

Team roster

- I Ketut Ardana
- Rendy Verdian Licardo
- Yosi Ariel Firnanda
- Tio Kesuma Sentosa
- Gunawan Dewantoro
- Yogi Hermawan

== Karate kata ==
Athlete	Event	Round 1		Round 2		Ranking round		Final / BM	
Athlete	Event	Score	Rank	Score	Rank	Score	Rank	Opposition Result	Rank
Ahmad Zaresta	Men's individual	24.94	3 Q	24.20	4 Q	24.60	3 q	Tozaki (USA); L 24.54–25.08	5
Nawar Kautsar	Women's individual	22.66	8	Did not advance					
