= Urango =

Urango is a surname. Notable people with this surname include:

- Geena Urango (born 1989), a Mexican-American volleyball player
- Juan Urango (born 1980), a Colombian boxer
- Liberman Agámez Urango (born 1985), a Colombian volleyball player
- Matthew Joseph Urango (1990 – 2024), also known as Cola Boyy, an American musician and activist
