= Natalie Hagglund =

American volleyball player (born 1992)

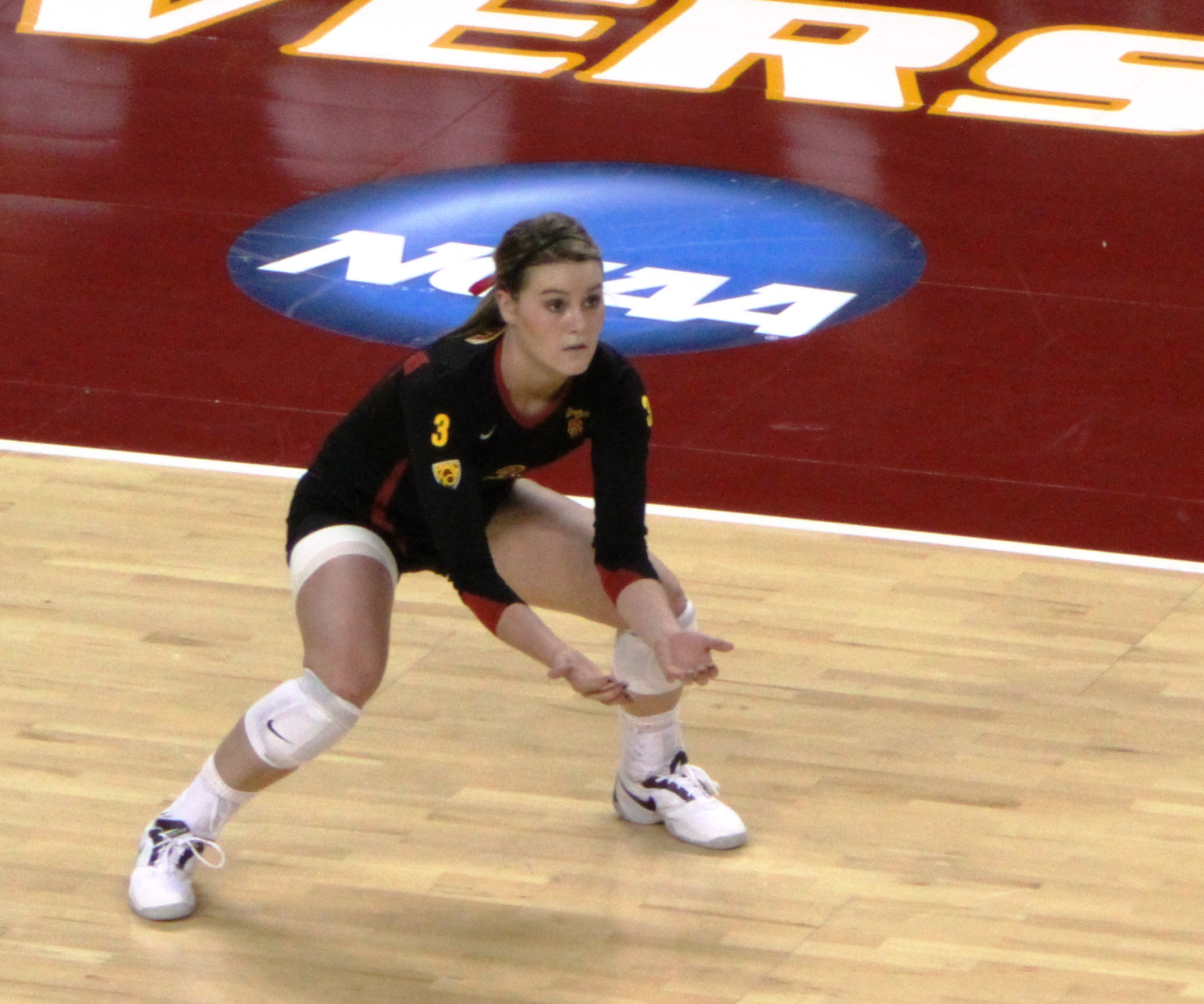

Personal information
- Nationality: American
- Born: July 1, 1992 (age 34)
- Hometown: Encinitas
- Height: 1.72 m (5 ft 8 in)
- Weight: 68 kg (150 lb)
- Spike: 292 cm (115 in)
- Block: 290 cm (114 in)

Volleyball information
- Number: 11

Career
Years	Teams
2015	(Switzerland) Voléro Zürich
2015–2017	(South Korea) Hyundai-Hillstate

National team
2014–2016	United States
Medal record
Women's volleyball
Representing the United States
Pan American Games
Gold medal – first place	2015 Toronto	Team
FIVB World Cup
Bronze medal – third place	2015 Japan	Team
FIVB World Grand Prix
Silver medal – second place	2016 Bangkok	Team
Montreux Volley Masters
Silver medal – second place	2014 Montreux	Team
Pan-American Cup
Gold medal – first place	2015 Lima/Callao	Team
Silver medal – second place	2014 Mexico City	Team
NORCECA Championship
Gold medal – first place	2015 Michoacán	Team

Natalie Marie Hagglund (born July 1, 1992) is an American volleyball player.

== Career ==
=== College ===
She played indoor volleyball, in the libero position, and beach volleyball for the USC Trojans.

=== National team ===
She participated in the 2014 Montreux Volley Masters, 2016 FIVB World Grand Prix.

=== Club ===
With her club Voléro Zürich she competed at the 2015 FIVB Volleyball Women's Club World Championship.
