= Krista Vansant =

American volleyball player

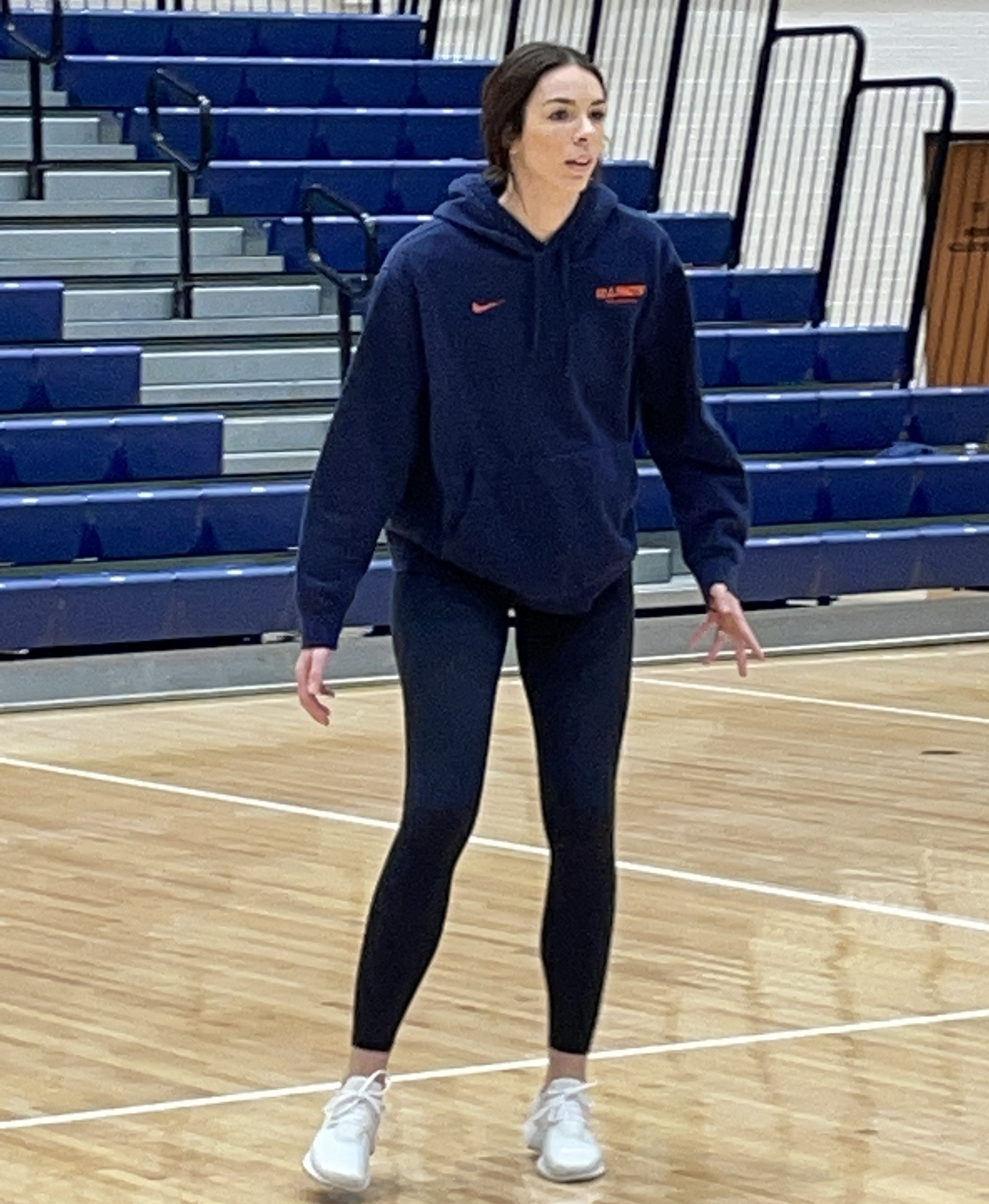
- Krista Vansant Hendrickson at an Illinois volleyball practice in October 2022

Personal information
- Nationality: United States
- Born: March 31, 1993 (age 33); Whittier, California, U.S.
- Hometown: Redlands, California, U.S.
- Height: 1.88 m (6 ft 2 in)
- Weight: 75 kg (165 lb)
- Spike: 310 cm (122 in)
- Block: 300 cm (118 in)
- Education: University of Washington

Volleyball information
- Position: Outside hitter

Career
Years	Teams
2015–2016	Voléro Zürich

National team
2015–2016	United States
Medal record
Women's volleyball
Representing United States
World Grand Prix
Gold medal – first place	2015 Omaha	Team
Silver medal – second place	2016 Bangkok	Team
Pan American Games
Gold medal – first place	2015 Toronto	Team
Pan American Cup
Gold medal – first place	2015 Peru	Team
NORCECA Championship
Gold medal – first place	2015 Morelio	Team

Krista Vansant (born March 31, 1993) is a volleyball player and coach who played collegiately for Washington. In 2022, she was the assistant coach for the University of Illinois volleyball team after spending 3 seasons as an assistant coach at Indiana.

== Early life ==
Vansant was born in Whittier, California, east of Los Angeles, to Tricia and Robert Vansant and grew up in Redlands, California. She played volleyball all four years at Redlands East Valley High School where she helped lead her team to three CIF championship titles. She recorded 1913 kills during her four years on the high school team. Her high school accomplishments resulted in being awarded the Gatorade Player of the Year award in volleyball. She was the consensus top pick in the nation as a senior, and chose to go to the University of Washington.

== College career ==
In her junior year at Washington, Vasant was named the National Player of the Year by the American Volleyball Coaches Association, as well as Pac-12 Player of the Year. She helped lead her team to the semifinals of the 2013 NCAA Division I women's volleyball tournament. In 2014 and 2015, she was the winner of the Honda Sports Award, given to the nation's top female collegiate volleyball player.

== Club career ==
Vansant had played professional club level volleyball for only 2015/16 season with the Swiss side Voléro Zürich. She won the Swiss Championship as well as the Swiss Cup with her team and contributed to club's eleventh double in twelve years. At the Champions League; Voléro topped their respective group with six wins from six matches, and eliminated Lokomotiv Baku in the first knock-out round to reach the playoff 6 stage of the competition, in which they were defeated by the eventual finalist VakıfBank S.K.

== National team ==
Vansant represented United States national team on an international competition for the first time at the 2015 Pan American Cup. She led the team to gold medal with a tournament-leading 50.4% kill percentage to go with 81 total points, and earned "most valuable player" and "best outside hitter" honors for the tournament. At the 2015 Pan American Games, she was the top scorer for the Team USA in five of their six matches and selected as the "best outside hitter", while the Americans winning the title. She also helped Team USA to capture the gold medal at the 2015 NORCECA Championship and was on the preliminary round squad at the 2015 and 2016 FIVB World Grand Prix, where Team USA won the gold and silver medal, respectively.

Vansant was named as an alternate for the 2016 Rio Olympic Team, but did not take part at the Olympic Games.

== Awards and honors ==
=== College ===
- Gatorade National Volleyball Player of the Year (2011)
- AVCA National Player of the Year (2013)
- Honda Sports Award for volleyball (2014, 2015)
- ESPNW National Volleyball Player of the Year (2014)
- Pac-12 Player of the Year (2014)
- Pac-12 Scholar-Athlete of the Year (2014)
- AVCA All-America First Team (2013, 2014)
- AVCA All-America Second Team (2012)
- All-Pac-12 Team (2012, 2013, 2014)
- Pac-12 Freshman of the Year (2011)

=== Individuals ===
- 2015 Pan American Cup "Most Valuable Player"
- 2015 Pan American Cup "Best Outside Hitter"
- 2015 Pan American Games "Best Outside Hitter"

=== Clubs ===
- 2015-16 National League A - Champion, with Voléro Zürich
- 2015-16 Swiss Cup - Champion, with Voléro Zürich

=== National team ===
- 2015 Pan American Cup - Gold Medal
- 2015 Pan American Games - Gold Medal
- 2015 FIVB World Grand Prix - Gold Medal
- 2015 NORCECA Championship - Gold Medal
- 2016 FIVB World Grand Prix - Silver Medal
