= Falyn Fonoimoana =

American volleyball player (born 1992)

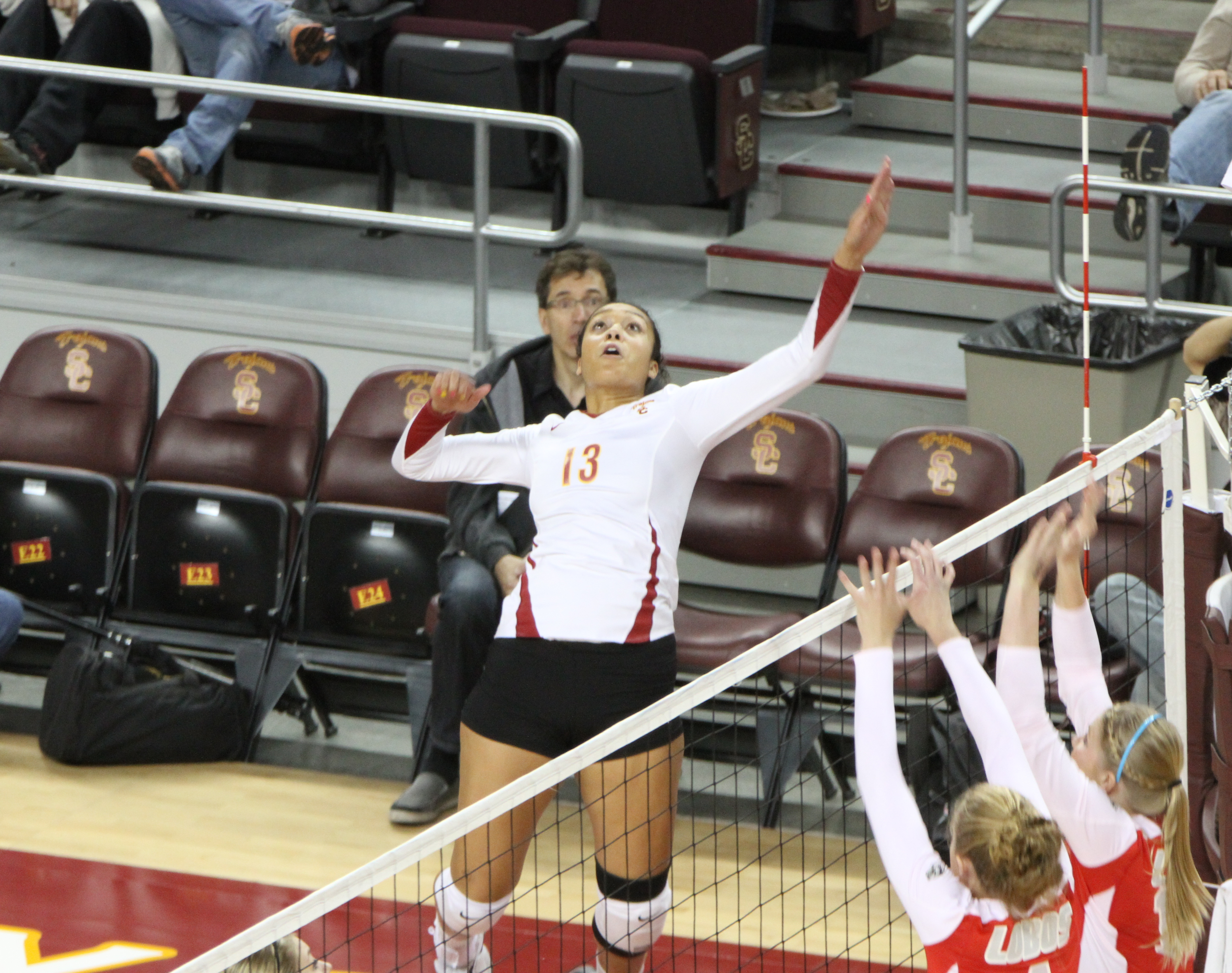
- Fonoimoana playing for USC

Personal information
- Full name: Falyn Talei Fonoimoana
- Nationality: American
- Born: March 13, 1992 (age 34); Hermosa Beach, California, U.S.
- Hometown: Hermosa Beach, California, U.S.
- Height: 6 ft 4 in (193 cm)
- Spike: 128 in (325 cm)
- Block: 120 in (305 cm)
- Education: Southern California

Volleyball information
- Position: Outside hitter / Opposite Hitter
- Current club: (United States) Athletes Unlimited
- Number: 19

Career
Years	Teams
2010–2011	(United States) Southern California
2012–2013	(Puerto Rico) Orientales de Humacao
2013–2014	(Puerto Rico) Criollas de Caguas
2014–2015	(Poland) PGE Atom Trefl Sopot
2015–2016	(Puerto Rico) Changos de Naranjito
2016–2017	(Puerto Rico) Indias de Mayagüez
2017–2018	(Puerto Rico) Criollas de Caguas
2022	(United States) Athletes Unlimited

National team
2015	United States
Medal record
Women's indoor Volleyball
Representing the United States
Pan American Games
Gold medal – first place	2015 Toronto	Team
Women's beach Volleyball
Representing the United States
NORCECA Beach Tour
Gold medal – first place	2018 Punta Cana	Beach
Gold medal – first place	2019 Ocho Rios	Beach
Gold medal – first place	2019 Hato Mayor	Beach
Silver medal – second place	2019 Aguascalientes	Beach
Silver medal – second place	2019 Cayman Islands	Beach
Bronze medal – third place	2019 Varadero	Beach

Falyn Talei Fonoimoana (born March 13, 1992) is an American professional indoor and beach volleyball player who plays as an opposite hitting for indoor professional league Athletes Unlimited. She has also represented the U.S. National Team in the 2015 Pan-American Games, earning a gold medal with the team.

== Personal life ==
Falyn Talei Fonoimoana was born and raised in Hermosa Beach, California. Her ancestral background is African American, English, Irish, Austrian, German, Hawaiian, Tahitian, and Samoan. She comes from an athletic family, as her uncle, Eric Fonoimoana, was a gold medalist in beach volleyball in the 2000 Summer Olympics. She attributed her interest in volleyball from a young age to Eric, as she used to be a ball girl for him. Her mother, Debbie, also played beach volleyball and trained with her sister, Lelei Fonoimoana, who swam in the 1976 Summer Olympics in Montreal, Quebec at 17 years old.

In high school, she attended Mira Costa High School in Manhattan Beach, California. The top-ranked national recruit in her graduating class, she was regarded as one of the best players ever at the high school level.

Fonoimoana has a son who was born in August 2012.

== Career ==
=== College ===
During Fonoimoana's freshman season in 2010, she was 2nd on her team in kills and was named the Pac-10 Freshman of the Year, as well as AVCA Pacific Region Freshman of the Year. However, her collegiate career was cut short during the beginning of her sophomore season in 2011: Southern California abruptly announced she was ineligible for the season. It was not clear why she was ineligible, but she never returned to play collegiately again.

=== Professional clubs (indoor) ===
- 2012–2013 (Puerto Rico) Orientales de Humacao
- 2013–2014 (Puerto Rico) Criollas de Caguas
- 2014–2015 (Poland) PGE Atom Trefl Sopot
- 2015–2016 (Puerto Rico) Changos de Naranjito
- 2015–2016 (Puerto Rico) Indias de Mayagüez
- 2015–2016 (Puerto Rico) Criollas de Caguas
- 2022 (United States) Athletes Unlimited

After retiring from indoor competition in 2016, she decided to return to it in 2022 and signed with American professional league Athletes Unlimited. During her season, she was voted MVP 1 of the match by her teammates and opponents when she posted a team-high 15 kills with seven digs. Not far into the season, she had five games with 10 or more kills. By the conclusion of the season, she ranked #19 out of 44 players with 2,209 total ranking points, averaging 2.86 kills per set, 103 digs, and 9 solo blocks.

=== USA National Team (indoor) ===
Fonoimoana was selected to represent the United States at the 2015 Pan American Games. United States won the gold medal after defeating Brazil in the final.

== Awards and honors ==
=== Indoor clubs ===
==== Team ====
- 2013–2014 Puerto Rican League – Gold medal, with Criollas de Caguas.
- 2014–2015 CEV Cup – Silver medal, with PGE Atom Trefl Sopot
- 2014–2015 TURON Liga – Silver medal, with PGE Atom Trefl Sopot
- 2014–2015 Polish Cup – Gold medal, with PGE Atom Trefl Sopot
- 2015–2016 Puerto Rican League – Gold medal, with Criollas de Caguas.

==== Individual ====
- Puerto Rican League - Best server (2012–2013), with Orientales de Humacao.
- Puerto Rican League - Best receiver (2013–2014), with Criollas de Caguas.

=== College ===
- AVCA Pacific Region Freshman of the Year (2010)
- Pac-10 Freshman of the Year (2010)

=== Beach volleyball ===
Fonoimoana committed to the AVP Tour in 2018 and has competed in several professional tournaments. She finished 4th in the 2019 AVP Austin with partner Nicolette Martin. In August 2021, Fonoimoana and her partner Geena Urango finished in 13th place at the Women's AVP $100,000 Gold Series Atlanta Open.

=== USA National Team (beach) ===
Fonoimoana has also represented the US in beach competition. She has won three gold medals, two silver medals, and one bronze medal in the NORCECA Beach Tours.
