= 4x4 beach volleyball at the 2019 World Beach Games =

- Venue: Katara Beach
- Dates: 12–16 October
- Competitors: 96

4x4 beach volleyball competitions at the 2019 World Beach Games in Doha, Qatar were held from October 12 to October 16, 2019. The venue for the competition was located at Katara Beach. A total of eight men's and eight women's teams (each consisting up to 6 athletes) competed in each tournament. This means a total of 96 athletes are scheduled to compete.

== Qualification ==
Each National Olympic Committee was allowed to enter up to one men's and one women's team in the 4x4 beach volleyball tournaments. The qualification processes for the men's and women's events were similar. The host country was guaranteed an entry in each event. The five spots were awarded to the best FIVB Beach Volleyball World Rankings for each continental federation. 2 more spots were awarded to invitation (wild card) process.

=== Men's qualification ===
Mean of qualification	Date	Host	Vacancies	Qualified
Host nation	14 June 2019	(Switzerland) Lausanne	1	Qatar
World Ranking for African Team	30 June 2019	(Switzerland) Lausanne	1	Mozambique
World Ranking for Asian Team	30 June 2019	(Switzerland) Lausanne	1	Australia
World Ranking for European Team	30 June 2019	(Switzerland) Lausanne	1	United States
World Ranking for North American Team	30 June 2019	(Switzerland) Lausanne	1	Poland
World Ranking for South American Team	30 June 2019	(Switzerland) Lausanne	1	Chile
Invitation process	n/a	(Switzerland) Lausanne	2	Germany Indonesia
Total			8	

=== Women's qualification ===
Mean of qualification	Date	Host	Vacancies	Qualified
World Ranking for African Team	30 June 2019	(Switzerland) Lausanne	1	The Gambia
World Ranking for Asian Team	30 June 2019	(Switzerland) Lausanne	1	Australia
World Ranking for European Team	30 June 2019	(Switzerland) Lausanne	1	Czech Republic
World Ranking for North American Team	30 June 2019	(Switzerland) Lausanne	1	Canada
World Ranking for South American Team	30 June 2019	(Switzerland) Lausanne	1	Brazil
Invitation process	n/a	(Switzerland) Lausanne	2	Vanuatu Nigeria
Reallocation of host country	n/a	(Switzerland) Lausanne	1	United States
Total			8	

== Medal summary ==
=== Medalists ===
Event	Gold	Silver	Bronze
Men	United States	Qatar	Indonesia
Women	United States	Brazil	Canada

== Participating nations ==
- Australia (12)
- Brazil (6)
- Canada (6)
- Chile (6)
- Czech Republic (6)
- The Gambia (6)
- Germany (6)
- Indonesia (6)
- Mozambique (6)
- Nigeria (6)
- Poland (6)
- Qatar (6)
- United States (12)
- Vanuatu (6)
