= Rachael Adams =

American volleyball player

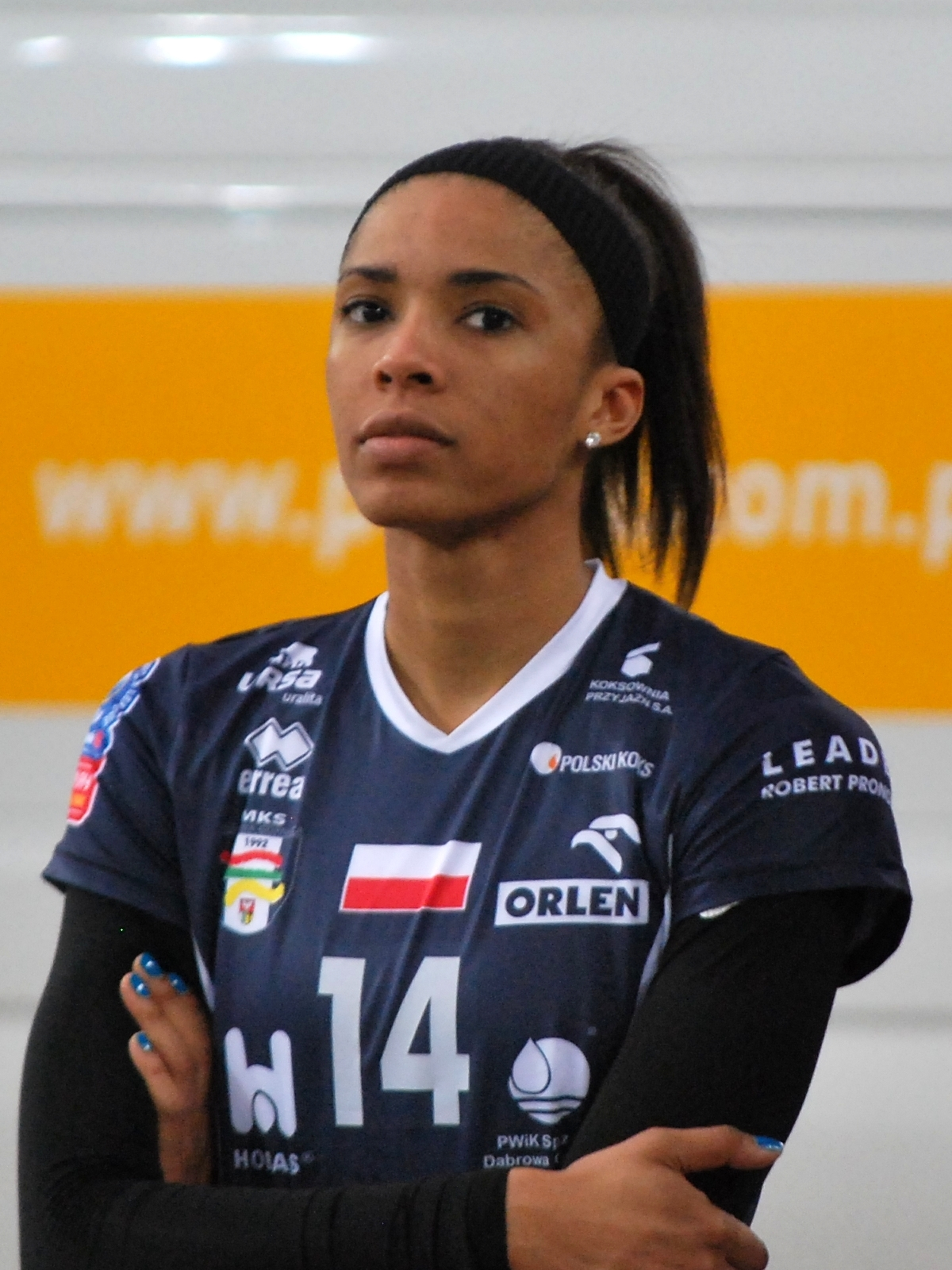

Personal information
- Full name: Rachael Alexis Adams
- Nationality: American
- Born: June 3, 1990 (age 36); Cincinnati, Ohio, U.S.
- Height: 6 ft 2 in (1.88 m)
- Weight: 179 lb (81 kg)
- Spike: 125 in (318 cm)
- Block: 121 in (307 cm)
- Education: University of Texas at Austin

Volleyball information
- Position: Middle blocker
- Current club: (United States)
- Number: 5

Career
Years	Teams
2013 - 2014	(Poland) Dąbrowa Górnicza
2014 - 2015	(Italy) Imoco Volley Conegliano
2015 - 2018	(Turkey) Eczacıbaşı VitrA
2018 - 2020	(Italy) US Victoria Monza
2020 - 2021	(Turkey) Aydın Büyükşehir Belediyespor
2021	(Brazil) Osasco Voleibol Clube

National team
United States
Medal record
Volleyball
Olympic Games
Bronze medal – third place	2016 Rio de Janeiro	Team
World Championship
Gold medal – first place	2014 Italy	Team
World Grand Champions Cup
Bronze medal – third place	2017 Japan	Team
FIVB World Grand Prix
Silver medal – second place	2016 Bangkok	Team
FIVB Nations League
Gold medal – first place	2018 Nanjing	Team
Pan American Games
Gold medal – first place	2015 Toronto	Team
Pan-American Cup
Gold medal – first place	2019 Trujillo/Chiclayo

Rachael Alexis Adams (born June 3, 1990) is an American former professional volleyball player who played as a middle blocker for the United States women's national volleyball team. Adams won gold with the national team at the 2014 World Championship and bronze at the 2016 Rio Olympic Games.

== Career ==
She attended Mount Notre Dame High School in Cincinnati, Ohio where she played volleyball. She then played college volleyball at University of Texas at Austin. In 2012, while at Texas, Adams was named as one of the four finalists for the Honda Sports Award in volleyball.

Adams was part of the USA national team that won the 2014 World Championship gold medal when the team defeated China 3–1 in the final match.

Adams was awarded among the Best Middle Blockers along with the Brazilian Thaísa Menezes during the 2016 World Grand Prix.

With her team Eczacıbaşı VitrA, she won the gold medal at the 2016 FIVB Volleyball Women's Club World Championship.

Adams won the 2016–17 CEV Champions League bronze medal with Eczacıbaşı VitrA when her team defeated the Russian Dinamo Moscow 3-0 and she was also awarded Best Middle Blocker. At the end of season 2017-2018 she signed for Italian club Monza and will play in Italian A1 league.

== Awards ==
=== Individual ===
- 2013 Nominee Honda Sports Award for volleyball
- 2016 World Grand Prix "Best Middle Blocker"
- 2016-17 CEV Champions League "Best Middle Blocker"

=== Clubs ===
- 2016–17 CEV Champions League - Bronze Medal, with Eczacıbaşı VitrA

=== National team ===
- 2013 Pan-American Volleyball Cup
- 2013 NORCECA Championship
- 2013 FIVB World Grand Champions Cup
- 2014 FIVB World Championship
- 2015 FIVB World Grand Prix
- 2016 FIVB World Grand Prix
- 2016 Summer Olympics

Awards
Preceded by (Brazil) Juciely Barreto (United States) Christa Harmotto	Best Middle Blocker of FIVB World Grand Prix; 2016 ex aequo (Brazil) Thaísa Menezes	Succeeded by (Brazil) Ana Beatriz Corrêa (Serbia) Milena Rašić
Preceded by (Serbia) Jovana Stevanović (Turkey) Eda Erdem Dündar	Best Middle Blocker of CEV Champions League; 2016-2017 ex aequo (Serbia) Milena Rašić	Succeeded by (Serbia) Milena Rašić (Romania) Nneka Onyejekwe
