= 2012 Women's Pan-American Volleyball Cup =

Tournament details
- Host country: Mexico
- Dates: 12–21 July
- Teams: 12
- Venues: 2 (in Ciudad Juárez host cities)

Final positions
- Champions: United States (2nd title)

Tournament awards
- MVP: Kristin Richards (USA)

The 2012 Pan-American Volleyball Cup was the eleventh edition of the annual women's volleyball tournament, played by twelve countries in July 2012 in Ciudad Juárez, Chihuahua, Mexico, after Lima, Peru, withdrew from hosting it. The top four NORCECA teams and the top from CSV confederation, in addition to Brazil, which was a wild card, qualified for the 2013 FIVB World Grand Prix.

== Competing nations ==
| Group A | Group B |
|---|---|
| Canada; Colombia; Cuba; Dominican Republic; Puerto Rico; United States | Argentina; Brazil; Costa Rica; Mexico; Peru; Trinidad and Tobago |

== Pool standing procedure ==
Match won 3–0: 5 points for the winner, 0 point for the loser
Match won 3–1: 4 points for the winner, 1 points for the loser
Match won 3–2: 3 points for the winner, 2 points for the loser
In case of tie, the teams were classified according to the following criteria:
points ratio and sets ratio

== Preliminary round ==
=== Group A ===
| Pos | Team | Pld | W | L | Pts | SPW | SPL | SPR | SW | SL | SR | Qualification |
|---|---|---|---|---|---|---|---|---|---|---|---|---|
| 1 | United States | 5 | 4 | 1 | 18 | 448 | 365 | 1.227 | 13 | 6 | 2.167 | Semifinals |
| 2 | Cuba | 5 | 4 | 1 | 18 | 462 | 413 | 1.119 | 14 | 7 | 2.000 | Quarterfinals |
| 3 | Dominican Republic | 5 | 3 | 2 | 18 | 436 | 400 | 1.090 | 13 | 7 | 1.857 | Quarterfinals |
| 4 | Puerto Rico | 5 | 2 | 3 | 11 | 331 | 354 | 0.935 | 7 | 9 | 0.778 | |
| 5 | Canada | 5 | 2 | 3 | 9 | 369 | 390 | 0.946 | 7 | 11 | 0.636 | |
| 6 | Colombia | 5 | 0 | 5 | 1 | 276 | 400 | 0.690 | 1 | 15 | 0.067 | |

| Date | Time | | Score | | Set 1 | Set 2 | Set 3 | Set 4 | Set 5 | Total | Report |
|---|---|---|---|---|---|---|---|---|---|---|---|
| 12 July | 12:00 | Dominican Republic | 3–0 | Colombia | 25–13 | 25–18 | 25–11 | | | 75–42 | Report |
| 12 July | 14:00 | United States | 3–0 | Canada | 25–15 | 25–22 | 25–15 | | | 75–52 | Report |
| 12 July | 16:00 | Cuba | 3–1 | Puerto Rico | 16–25 | 25–15 | 25–18 | 25–19 | | 91–77 | Report |
| 13 July | 16:00 | Cuba | 3–0 | Colombia | 25–19 | 25–21 | 25–15 | | | 75–55 | Report |
| 13 July | 18:00 | Dominican Republic | 3–1 | Canada | 25–17 | 18–25 | 25–19 | 25–21 | | 93–82 | Report |
| 13 July | 20:00 | United States | 3–0 | Puerto Rico | 25–15 | 25–12 | 25–14 | | | 75–41 | Report |
| 14 July | 16:00 | Canada | 3–0 | Colombia | 25–12 | 25–19 | 25–13 | | | 75–44 | Report |
| 14 July | 16:00 | Dominican Republic | 3–0 | Puerto Rico | 25–22 | 25–19 | 25–22 | | | 75–63 | Report |
| 14 July | 18:00 | United States | 1–3 | Cuba | 18–25 | 23–25 | 25–18 | 19–25 | | 85–93 | Report |
| 15 July | 16:00 | Puerto Rico | 3–0 | Canada | 25–20 | 25–18 | 25–18 | | | 75–56 | Report |
| 15 July | 16:00 | United States | 3–1 | Colombia | 25–27 | 25–21 | 25–13 | 25–17 | | 100–78 | Report |
| 15 July | 20:00 | Dominican Republic | 2–3 | Cuba | 25–17 | 25–18 | 8–25 | 21–25 | 13–15 | 92–100 | Report |
| 16 July | 16:00 | Cuba | 2–3 | Canada | 23–25 | 23–25 | 25–17 | 25–22 | 7–15 | 103–104 | Report |
| 16 July | 16:00 | Puerto Rico | 3–0 | Colombia | 25–22 | 25–15 | 25–20 | | | 75–57 | Report |
| 16 July | 18:00 | United States | 3–2 | Dominican Republic | 24–26 | 24–26 | 25–15 | 25–22 | 15–12 | 113–101 | Report |

=== Group B ===
| Pos | Team | Pld | W | L | Pts | SPW | SPL | SPR | SW | SL | SR | Qualification |
|---|---|---|---|---|---|---|---|---|---|---|---|---|
| 1 | Brazil | 5 | 5 | 0 | 25 | 377 | 239 | 1.577 | 15 | 0 | MAX | Semifinals |
| 2 | Peru | 5 | 4 | 1 | 19 | 360 | 300 | 1.200 | 12 | 4 | 3.000 | Quarterfinals |
| 3 | Argentina | 5 | 3 | 2 | 16 | 378 | 316 | 1.196 | 10 | 6 | 1.667 | Quarterfinals |
| 4 | Costa Rica | 5 | 2 | 3 | 7 | 325 | 422 | 0.770 | 6 | 12 | 0.500 | |
| 5 | Trinidad and Tobago | 5 | 1 | 4 | 6 | 353 | 424 | 0.833 | 5 | 13 | 0.385 | |
| 6 | Mexico | 5 | 0 | 5 | 2 | 327 | 419 | 0.780 | 2 | 15 | 0.133 | |

| Date | Time | | Score | | Set 1 | Set 2 | Set 3 | Set 4 | Set 5 | Total | Report |
|---|---|---|---|---|---|---|---|---|---|---|---|
| 12 July | 15:00 | Brazil | 3–0 | Costa Rica | 25–9 | 25–15 | 25–11 | | | 75–35 | Report |
| 12 July | 17:00 | Argentina | 1–3 | Peru | 25–14 | 21–25 | 21–25 | 23–25 | | 90–89 | Report |
| 12 July | 20:00 | Mexico | 1–3 | Trinidad and Tobago | 25–27 | 20–25 | 25–17 | 19–25 | | 89–94 | Report |
| 13 July | 16:00 | Argentina | 3–0 | Trinidad and Tobago | 26–24 | 25–14 | 25–13 | | | 76–51 | Report |
| 13 July | 18:00 | Brazil | 3–0 | Peru | 25–11 | 25–19 | 25–16 | | | 75–46 | Report |
| 13 July | 20:00 | Mexico | 1–3 | Costa Rica | 27–25 | 18–25 | 20–25 | 23–25 | | 88–100 | Report |
| 14 July | 18:00 | Brazil | 3–0 | Trinidad and Tobago | 25–16 | 25–16 | 25–20 | | | 75–52 | Report |
| 14 July | 20:00 | Peru | 3–0 | Costa Rica | 25–11 | 25–11 | 25–15 | | | 75–37 | Report |
| 14 July | 20:00 | Mexico | 0–3 | Argentina | 15–25 | 19–25 | 21–25 | | | 55–75 | Report |
| 15 July | 18:00 | Brazil | 3–0 | Argentina | 25–20 | 25–17 | 27–25 | | | 77–62 | Report |
| 15 July | 18:00 | Costa Rica | 3–2 | Trinidad and Tobago | 25–22 | 24–26 | 19–25 | 26–24 | 15–12 | 109–109 | Report |
| 15 July | 20:00 | Mexico | 0–3 | Peru | 18–25 | 19–25 | 14–25 | | | 51–75 | Report |
| 16 July | 18:00 | Peru | 3–0 | Trinidad and Tobago | 25–15 | 25–20 | 25–12 | | | 75–47 | Report |
| 16 July | 20:00 | Argentina | 3–0 | Costa Rica | 25–14 | 25–22 | 25–8 | | | 75–44 | Report |
| 16 July | 20:00 | Mexico | 0–3 | Brazil | 14–25 | 9–25 | 21–25 | | | 44–75 | Report |

== Final round ==
=== Championship bracket ===
Quarterfinals
B2 | Peru | 0
A3 | Dominican Republic | 3
A2 | Cuba | 3
B3 | Argentina | 0

Semifinals
A1 | United States | 3
A3 | Dominican Republic | 1
B1 | Brazil | 3
A2 | Cuba | 1

Finals
A1 | United States | 3
B1 | Brazil | 2
Third place
A3 | Dominican Republic | 2
A2 | Cuba | 3

=== 5th–10th places bracket ===
Classification 5–10
B4 | Costa Rica | 2
A5 | Canada | 3
A4 | Puerto Rico | 3
B5 | Trinidad and Tobago | 1

Classification 5–8
B3 | Argentina | 3
A5 | Canada | 1
B2 | Peru | 1
A4 | Puerto Rico | 3
Classification 9–10
B4 | Costa Rica | 3
B5 | Trinidad and Tobago | 2

Classification 5–6
B3 | Argentina | 3
A4 | Puerto Rico | 0
Classification 7–8
A5 | Canada | 0
B2 | Peru | 3

=== Eleventh place match ===
| Date | Time | | Score | | Set 1 | Set 2 | Set 3 | Set 4 | Set 5 | Total | Report |
|---|---|---|---|---|---|---|---|---|---|---|---|
| 18 July | 20:00 | Colombia | 3–2 | Mexico | 25–23 | 21–25 | 25–16 | 21–25 | 15–13 | 107–102 | Report |

=== Classification 7–10 ===
| Date | Time | | Score | | Set 1 | Set 2 | Set 3 | Set 4 | Set 5 | Total | Report |
|---|---|---|---|---|---|---|---|---|---|---|---|
| 18 July | 16:00 | Costa Rica | 2–3 | Canada | 22–25 | 25–18 | 16–25 | 25–13 | 13–15 | 101–96 | Report |
| 18 July | 18:00 | Puerto Rico | 3–1 | Trinidad and Tobago | 25–27 | 25–11 | 25–19 | 25–17 | | 100–74 | Report |

=== Quarterfinals ===
| Date | Time | | Score | | Set 1 | Set 2 | Set 3 | Set 4 | Set 5 | Total | Report |
|---|---|---|---|---|---|---|---|---|---|---|---|
| 18 July | 18:00 | Cuba | 3–0 | Argentina | 25–16 | 25–13 | 25–20 | | | 75–49 | Report |
| 18 July | 20:00 | Peru | 0–3 | Dominican Republic | 17–25 | 16–25 | 20–25 | | | 53–75 | Report |

=== Classification 5–8 ===
| Date | Time | | Score | | Set 1 | Set 2 | Set 3 | Set 4 | Set 5 | Total | Report |
|---|---|---|---|---|---|---|---|---|---|---|---|
| 19 July | 16:00 | Canada | 1–3 | Argentina | 25–23 | 14–25 | 24–26 | 14–25 | | 77–99 | Report |
| 19 July | 18:00 | Puerto Rico | 3–1 | Peru | 24–26 | 25–15 | 25–18 | 25–21 | | 99–80 | Report |

=== Ninth place match ===
| Date | Time | | Score | | Set 1 | Set 2 | Set 3 | Set 4 | Set 5 | Total | Report |
|---|---|---|---|---|---|---|---|---|---|---|---|
| 19 July | 20:00 | Costa Rica | 3–2 | Trinidad and Tobago | 25–19 | 21–25 | 25–15 | 20–25 | 15–6 | 106–90 | Report |

=== Semifinals ===
| Date | Time | | Score | | Set 1 | Set 2 | Set 3 | Set 4 | Set 5 | Total | Report |
|---|---|---|---|---|---|---|---|---|---|---|---|
| 19 July | 18:00 | Brazil | 3–1 | Cuba | 27–25 | 25–18 | 19–25 | 25–18 | | 96–86 | Report |
| 19 July | 20:00 | United States | 3–1 | Dominican Republic | 25–20 | 26–24 | 24–26 | 25–16 | | 100–86 | Report |

=== Seventh place match ===
| Date | Time | | Score | | Set 1 | Set 2 | Set 3 | Set 4 | Set 5 | Total | Report |
|---|---|---|---|---|---|---|---|---|---|---|---|
| 20 July | 14:00 | Canada | 0–3 | Peru | 19–25 | 28–30 | 21–25 | | | 68–80 | Report |

=== Fifth place match ===
| Date | Time | | Score | | Set 1 | Set 2 | Set 3 | Set 4 | Set 5 | Total | Report |
|---|---|---|---|---|---|---|---|---|---|---|---|
| 20 July | 16:00 | Argentina | 3–0 | Puerto Rico | 25–20 | 25–20 | 25–17 | | | 75–57 | Report |

=== Bronze medal match ===
| Date | Time | | Score | | Set 1 | Set 2 | Set 3 | Set 4 | Set 5 | Total | Report |
|---|---|---|---|---|---|---|---|---|---|---|---|
| 20 July | 18:00 | Cuba | 3–2 | Dominican Republic | 25–21 | 28–26 | 23–25 | 18–25 | 15–12 | 109–109 | Report |

=== Gold medal match ===
| Date | Time | | Score | | Set 1 | Set 2 | Set 3 | Set 4 | Set 5 | Total | Report |
|---|---|---|---|---|---|---|---|---|---|---|---|
| 20 July | 20:00 | Brazil | 2–3 | United States | 30–28 | 25–18 | 22–25 | 21–25 | 11–15 | 109–111 | Report |

== Final standing ==
| Rank | Team |
|---|---|
| 1st place, gold medalist(s) | United States |
| 2nd place, silver medalist(s) | Brazil |
| 3rd place, bronze medalist(s) | Cuba |
| 4 | Dominican Republic |
| 5 | Argentina |
| 6 | Puerto Rico |
| 7 | Peru |
| 8 | Canada |
| 9 | Costa Rica |
| 10 | Trinidad and Tobago |
| 11 | Colombia |
| 12 | Mexico |

| Team qualified to the 2013 FIVB World Grand Prix |

== Individual awards ==
- Most valuable player
  (United States) Kristin Richards
- Best scorer
  (United States) Kristin Richards
- Best spiker
  (Cuba) Yanelis Santos
- Best blocker
  (Brazil) Natasha Farinea
- Best server
  (Cuba) Yanelis Santos
- Best digger
  (Dominican Republic) Brenda Castillo
- Best setter
  (Peru) Elena Keldibekova
- Best receiver
  (Dominican Republic) Brenda Castillo
- Best libero
  (Dominican Republic) Brenda Castillo
