= Carli Lloyd (volleyball) =

American volleyball player (born 1989)

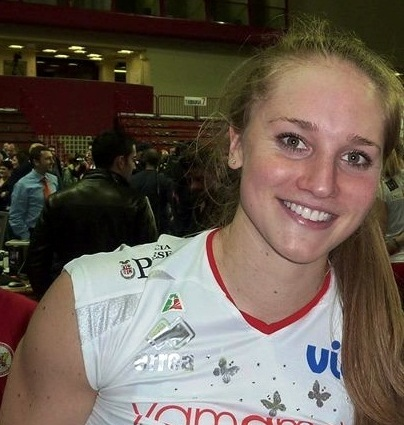
- Carli Lloyd playing for Praia Clube (2018)

Personal information
- Full name: Carli Ellen Lloyd
- Born: August 6, 1989 (age 37); Fallbrook, California, U.S.
- Hometown: Bonsall, California, U.S.
- Height: 5 ft 11 in (1.80 m)
- Weight: 165 lb (75 kg)
- Spike: 123 in (313 cm)
- Block: 116 in (295 cm)
- Education: University of California-Berkeley

Volleyball information
- Position: Setter
- Current club: (United States) LOVB Austin
- Number: 6 (national team) 3 (LOVB Austin)

National team
2011–2018	United States
Medal record
Representing the United States
Women's volleyball
Olympic Games
Bronze medal – third place	2016 Rio de Janeiro	Team
World Grand Champions Cup
Bronze medal – third place	2017 Japan	Team
World Grand Prix
Silver medal – second place	2016 Bangkok	Team
FIVB Nations League
Gold medal – first place	2018 Nanjing	Team
Pan American Games
Gold medal – first place	2015 Toronto	Team
Bronze medal – third place	2011 Guadalajara	Team
Pan-American Cup
Gold medal – first place	2015 Callao/Lima
Women's beach volleyball
World Tour
Bronze medal – third place	2023 Halifax	Beach

Carli Ellen Lloyd (born August 6, 1989) is an American professional volleyball player who played as a setter for the United States women's national volleyball team. She played college women's volleyball at the University of California, Berkeley. Lloyd won bronze with the national team at the 2016 Rio Olympic Games.

== Career ==
Lloyd played with the Italian club Yamamay Busto Arsizio from the 2011/12 to the 2012/13 season, winning during the season 2011/12 the League, Cup and Supercup also winning the CEV Cup.

With the Italian club Pomì Casalmaggiore Lloyd won the Italian League and the 2015–2016 Champions League.

Lloyd won the Best Setter individual award and the 2015 Pan-American Cup gold medal. She later won the 2015 Pan American Games gold medal and became Most Valuable Player and Best Setter. She was born in 1989.

== Clubs ==
- (Italy) Yamamay Busto Arsizio (2011–2013)
- (Italy) Prosecco Doc-Imoco Conegliano (2013–2014)
- (Azerbaijan) Lokomotiv Baku (2014–2015)
- (Italy) Pomí Casalmaggiore (2015–2017)
- (Brazil) Hinode Barueri (2017–2018)
- (Brazil) Dentil Praia Clube (2018–2019)
- (Turkey) Eczacıbaşı VitrA (2019–2020)
- (Italy) Pomí Casalmaggiore (2020–2021)
- (United States) Athletes Unlimited Pro Volleyball (2021–2022)
- (Italy) Women E-Work Busto Arsizio (2022–2023)
- (Puerto Rico) Cangrejeras de Santurce (2023–2024)
- (United States) LOVB Austin (2024–present)

== Awards ==
=== College ===
- 2010 AVCA Player of the Year
- 2010 NCAA Division I: Most Outstanding Player (regional)
- 2010 NCAA Division I: Final Four All-Tournament Team
- 2007 NCAA Division I: Madison Regional All-Tournament Team

=== Individual ===
- 2015 Pan-American Cup "Best Setter"
- 2015 Pan American Games "Best Setter"
- 2015 Pan American Games "Most Valuable Player"
- 2015–16 CEV Champions League "Best Setter"
- 2016 FIVB Club World Championship "Best Setter"

=== Clubs ===
- 2011–12 Italian Cup – Champion, with Yamamay Busto Arsizio
- 2011–12 Italian League – Champion, with Yamamay Busto Arsizio
- 2012 Italian Supercup – Champion, with Yamamay Busto Arsizio
- 2011–12 CEV Cup – Champion, with Yamamay Busto Arsizio
- 2012–13 CEV Champions League – Bronze medal, with Yamamay Busto Arsizio
- 2015 Italian Supercup – Champion, with Pomì Casalmaggiore
- 2015–16 CEV Champions League – Champion, with Pomi Casalmaggiore
- 2016 FIVB Club World Championship – Runner-up, with Pomi Casalmaggiore
- 2018 Minas Gerais Championship – Runner-up, with Praia Clube
- 2018 Brazilian Supercup – Champion, with Praia Clube
- 2018–19 Brazilian Superliga – Runner-up, with Praia Clube

Awards
Preceded by (Cuba) Yoana Palacios	Most Valuable Player of Pan American Games; 2015	Succeeded by Incumbent
Preceded by (Brazil) Dani Lins	Best Setter of Pan American Games; 2015	Succeeded by Incumbent
Preceded by (Brazil) Fabíola de Souza	Best Setter of FIVB Club World Championship; 2016	Succeeded by (Japan) Kaname Yamaguchi
