= Marianne Fersola =

Dominican volleyball player

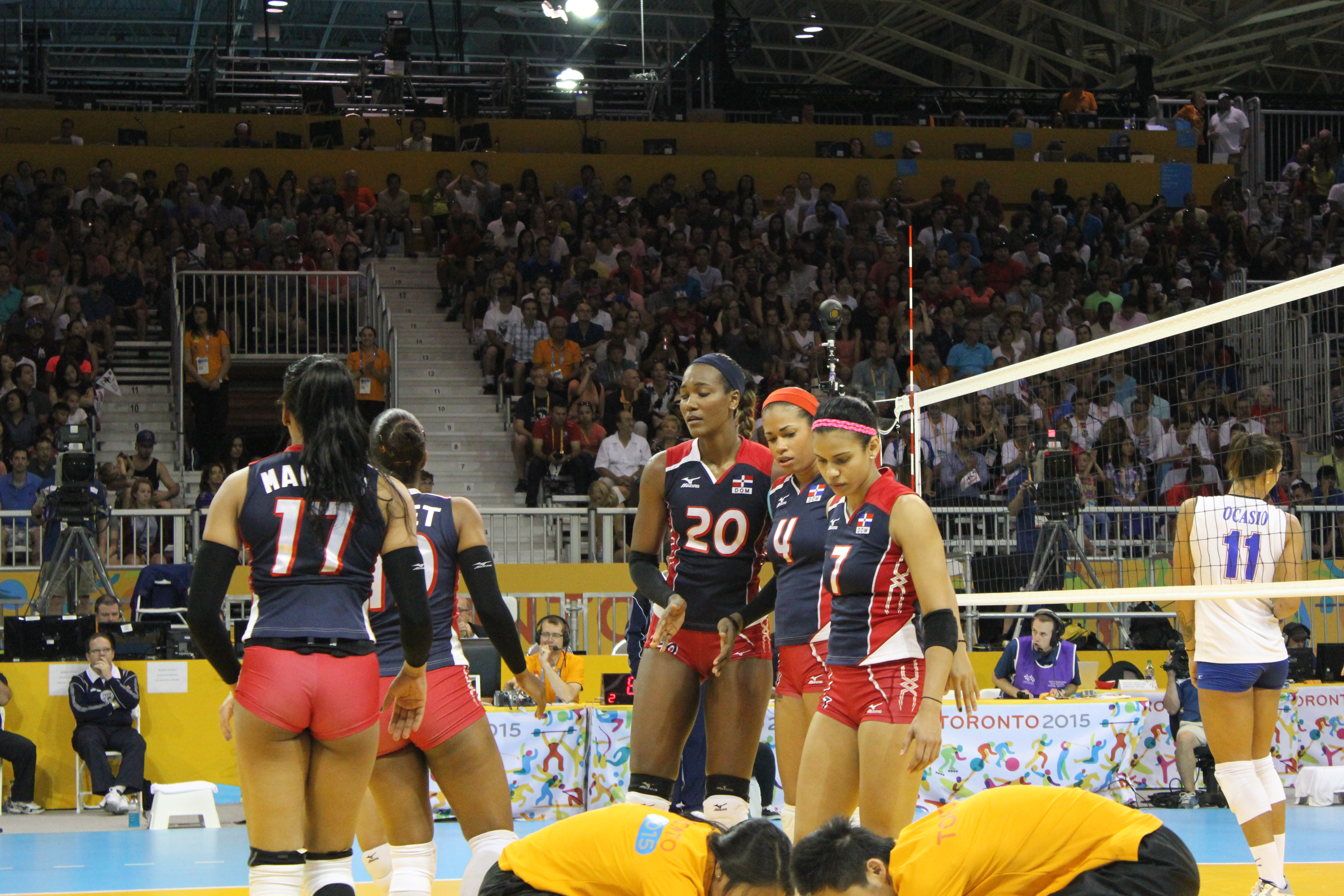

Personal information
- Full name: Marianne Fersola Norberto
- Nationality: Dominican
- Born: January 16, 1992 (age 34); Santo Domingo, Dominican Republic
- Height: 1.91 m (6 ft 3 in)
- Weight: 60 kg (132 lb)
- Spike: 315 cm (124 in)
- Block: 310 cm (120 in)

Volleyball information
- Position: Middle Blocker
- Number: 4
Honours
Women's volleyball
Representing the Dominican Republic
U20 World Championship
Silver medal – second place	2009 Mexicali/Tijuana	Team
NORCECA Championship
Gold medal – first place	2013 Omaha	Team
Pan American Cup
Gold medal – first place	2014 Mexico City	Team
Gold medal – first place	2016 Santo Domingo	Team
Silver medal – second place	2013 Lima	Team
Silver medal – second place	2015 Lima/Callao	Team
Silver medal – second place	2017 Cañete/Lima	Team
Silver medal – second place	2018 Santo Domingo	Team
Central American and Caribbean Games
Gold medal – first place	2018 Barranquilla	Team
Gold medal – first place	2014 Veracruz	Team
Pan American Games
Bronze medal – third place	2015 Toronto	Team
Final Four Cup
Bronze medal – third place	2009 Lima	Team
U23 Pan-American Cup
Gold medal – first place	2012 Callao	Team

Marianne Fersola (born January 16, 1992, in Santo Domingo) is a Dominican volleyball player, who plays as a Center. She was a member of the Women's National Team, who won the bronze medal with her native country at the 2008 NORCECA Girls' U18 Volleyball Continental Championship in Guaynabo, Puerto Rico, wearing the number #4 jersey.

== Clubs ==
- (Dominican Republic) Mirador (2005–2006)
- (Dominican Republic) Distrito Nacional (2006–2007)
- (Dominican Republic) La Romana (2007–2008)
- (Dominican Republic) Pueblo Nuevo (2008–2009)
- (Spain) CAV Murcia 2005 (2009–2010)
- (Dominican Republic) Mirador (2010–2012)
- (Peru) Universidad César Vallejo (2012–2013)
- (Azerbaijan) Igtisadchi Baku (2013–2014)
- (Dominican Republic) Mirador (2014–2015)
- (Dominican Republic) Cristo Rey (2017–2018)
- (Peru) Tupac (2018–2019)
- (Dominican Republic) Mirador (2018–2019)

== Awards ==
=== National team ===
==== Senior team ====
- 2009 Final Four Women's Cup - Bronze Medal
- 2010 Pan-American Cup - Gold Medal
- 2013 NORCECA Championship - Silver Medal
- 2014 Pan-American Cup - Gold Medal
- 2015 Pan-American Cup - Silver Medal
- 2015 Pan American Games - Bronze Medal

==== Junior team ====
- 2008 NORCECA Girls Youth Continental Championship U-18 - Bronze Medal
- 2009 FIVB U20 Volleyball World Championship - Silver Medal
- 2011 Junior Pan-American Cup - Silver Medal
- 2012 U23 Pan-American Cup - Gold Medal

=== Clubs ===
- 2012–13 Peruvian League - Champion, with Universidad César Vallejo
- 2013–14 Azerbaijan Championship - Bronze medal, with Igtisadchi Baku
