= Geena Urango =

American volleyball player (born 1989)

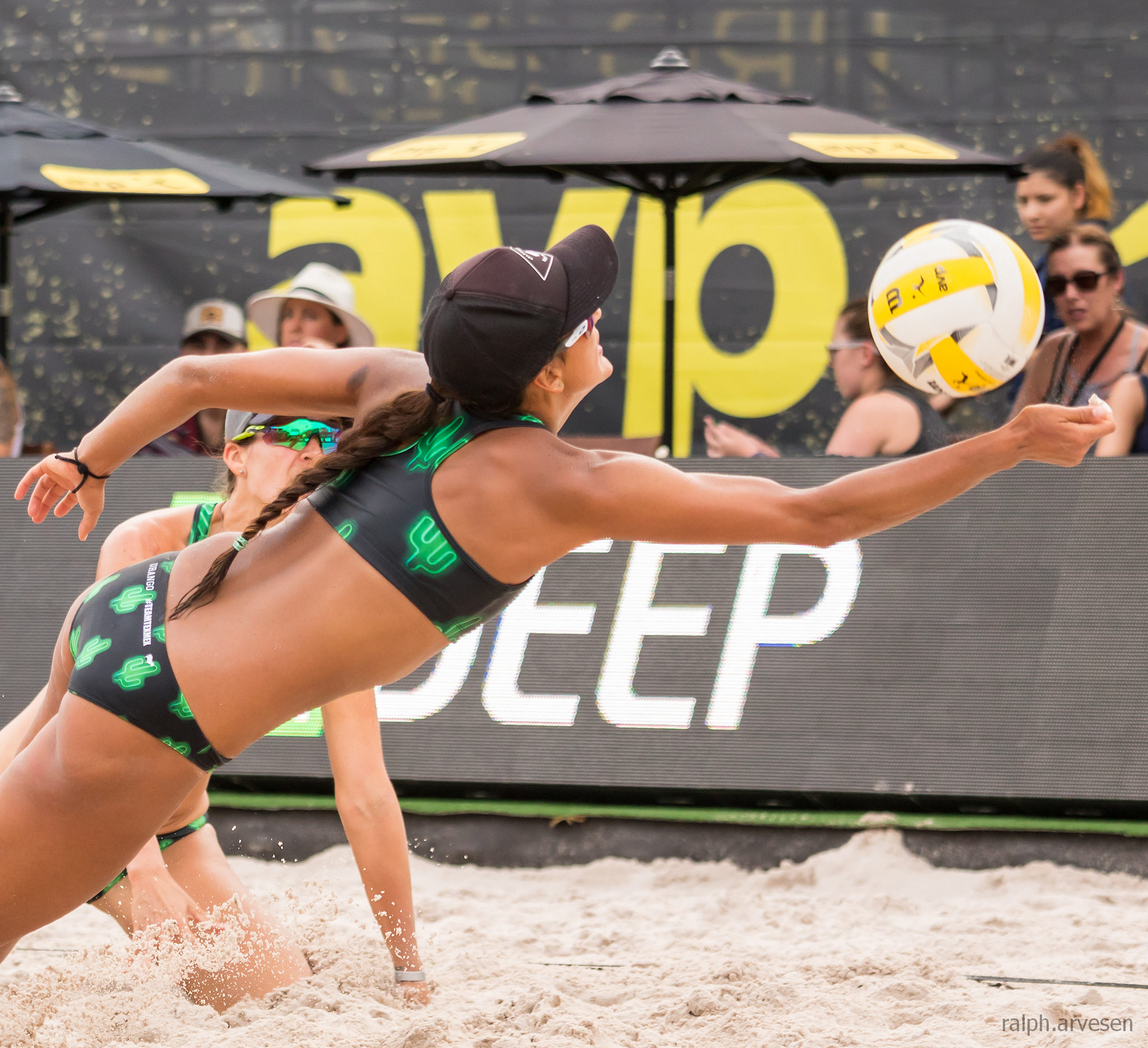
- Urango in 2017

Personal information
- Full name: Geena St. Clair Urango
- Nationality: United States; Mexico
- Born: August 2, 1989 (age 37)
- Home town: Los Alamitos, California, U.S.
- Education: University of Southern California
- Height: 179 cm (5 ft 10 in)

Volleyball information
- Position: Defensive Specialist/Outside Hitter

Career
- Years: Team
- 2007–2010: USC Trojans

National team
- Years: Team
- 2006: (United States) USA U-20 indoor national team
- 2011: (United States) USA U-23 beach volleyball team
- 2019: (United States) USA beach volleyball team
Medal record
Indoor Volleyball
Representing the (United States) USA U-20 national team
NORCECA Volleyball Championship
Gold medal – first place	2006 Monterrey
Women’s beach Volleyball
Representing the United States
World Tour
Silver medal – second place	2019 Chetumal	Beach
World Beach Games
Gold medal – first place	2019 Doha	Beach
NORCECA Beach Tour
Gold medal – first place	2019 Punta Cana	Beach

Geena St. Clair Urango (born Geena St. Clair Urango; August 2, 1989) is an American professional beach volleyball player and former indoor volleyball player.

== Personal life ==
Urango was born on August 2, 1989, to parents Tino and Kathi. Her birth name was "Gina St. Claire Urango"; her first name spelling was changed from "Gina" to "Geena" after her mother did numerology on the spelling of "Gina", concluding that if they kept that spelling, her future would not look promising or good. Both her parents loved the name too much to choose a different one, so they agreed to change the spelling.

She was raised in Los Alamitos, California, and played volleyball for Los Alamitos High School. With her high school team, she won the 2006 CIF Division I state championship and was named tournament most valuable player. In 2006, she was named Long Beach Press-Telegram Player of the Year. She also played two years for the U.S. Youth National Team in 2005 and 2006 and played on the Junior National Team. She was a member of the gold-medal team that won the 2006 NORCECA championship in Monterrey, Mexico.

== Career ==
=== Indoor ===
Urango played indoor volleyball for USC from 2007 to 2010, playing both outside hitter and defensive specialist roles. She graduated from USC with a bachelor's degree in communication and a master's degree in communication management.

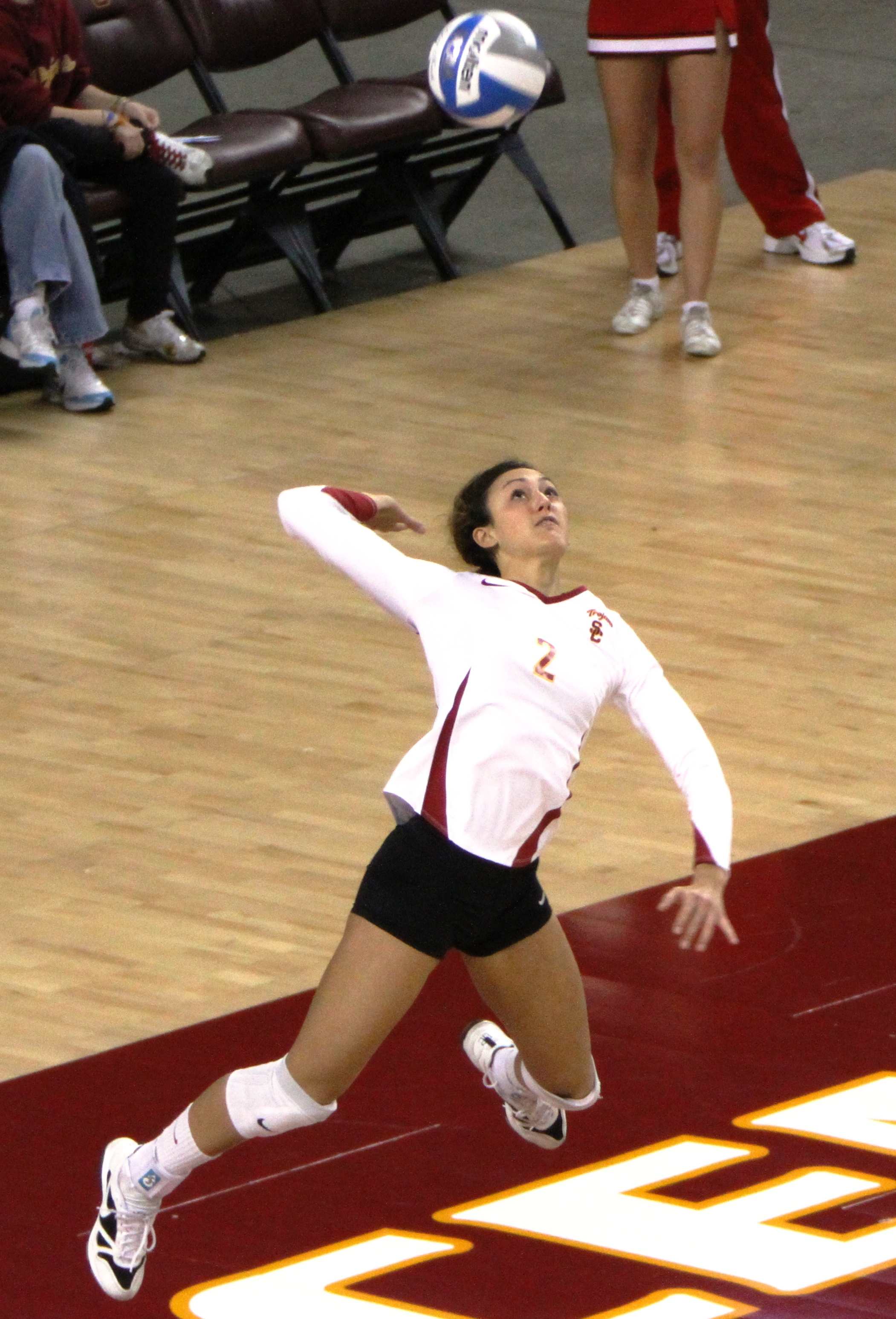
Urango serving for USC

She played in every indoor match at USC during her career except for 3 matches. She was voted a member of the Pac-10 All-Freshman Team Honorable Mention in 2007 and was the team captain in 2010 for the indoor team and the beach team in 2012. She finished her career with 225 kills, 100 service aces, 706 digs, and 338.5 total points.

=== Beach ===
As a graduate student at USC, she became the first scholarship recipient for USC's sand volleyball team in 2012. Urango and partner Sara Shaw placed fifth in the inaugural AVCA Collegiate Sand Volleyball National Championships.

Urango turned professional in beach volleyball in 2007, making her debut at the Manhattan Beach Open alongside Alix Klineman. She earned the AAA beach rating in the summer of 2008 along with USC teammate Zoe Garrett. She participated in the 2011 World University Games for the United States U23 beach volleyball team.

In 2012, she played one AVP event with Caitlin Ledoux, finishing 17th. In 2014, she began her partnership with Angela Bensend, advancing to finals in two AVP events. Urango finished fourth on the tour in aces and eighth in digs. In 2018, she ended the season ranking first in aces and 10th in digs. She played once on the FIVB tour, finishing in 25th place with Ali McColloch.

In September 2019, she won a gold medal with partner Emily Hartong in the NORCECA beach tour in Punta Cana, Dominican Republic. In October 2019, Urango won a gold medal with her teammates at the 2019 World Beach Games that were held in Doha, Qatar in the 4x4 beach volleyball event. She had eight kills in the final match versus Brazil.

Urango partnered with Falyn Fonoimoana in August 2021, finishing in 13th place at the Women's AVP $100,000 Gold Series Atlanta Open.

In August 2022, she became AVP champion when she won the Atlanta Gold Series with partner Julia Scoles, marking her first AVP championship victory. With Scoles in 2022, the duo has played in six AVP tournaments, advancing to two semifinals, three finals, and one championship.

== Awards and honors ==
- AVP Most Improved Player (2016)
