= Volleyball at the 2015 Pan American Games – Women's tournament =

Volleyball – Women's tournament at the 2015 Pan American Games
- Venue: Exhibition Centre Hall A
- Dates: July 16 – July 26
- Competitors: 96 from 8 nations

Medalists
Gold medal	United States
Silver medal	Brazil
Bronze medal	Dominican Republic

The women's tournament of volleyball at the 2015 Pan American Games in Toronto, Canada began on July 16 and end on July 26. All games were held at the Exhibition Centre. The United States defeated 3-0 to Brazil, who were the defending champions. American Carli Lloyd became the Most Valuable Player.

== Teams ==
=== Qualification ===
The following nations qualified for the women's tournament:

Criteria	Vacancies	Qualified
Host Nation	1	Canada
North, Central American and Caribbean ranking	4	United States; Dominican Republic; Puerto Rico; Cuba
South American Ranking	3	Brazil; Argentina; Peru
Total	8	

=== Squads ===
At the start of tournament, all eight participating countries had 12 players on their rosters. Final squads for the tournament are due on June 16, 2015 a month before the start of 2015 Pan American Games. Puerto Rican player Sheilla Ocasio tested positive for Stanozolol before the bronze medal match against the Dominican Republic, lost 1-3 by her national team.

- Argentina
- Brazil
- Canada
- Cuba
- Dominican Republic
- Peru
- Puerto Rico
- United States

== Preliminary round ==
All times are local Eastern Daylight Time (UTC-4)

Team qualified for the semifinals
Team qualified for the quarterfinals

=== Group A ===
Pos	Team	Pld	W	L	Pts	SPW	SPL	SPR	SW	SL	SR
1	Dominican Republic	3	2	1	10	261	215	1.214	7	4	1.750
2	Argentina	3	2	1	10	252	254	0.992	7	4	1.750
3	Cuba	3	1	2	5	248	259	0.958	4	7	0.571
4	Canada	3	1	2	5	228	261	0.874	4	7	0.571

Source: Archived 2015-10-20 at the Wayback Machine

Date		Score		Set 1	Set 2	Set 3	Set 4	Set 5	Total	Report
Jul 16	Argentina	3–0	Cuba	25–23	26–24	25–19			76–66	P2P3
Jul 16	Canada	0–3	Dominican Republic	15–25	13–25	15–25			43–75	P2P3
Jul 18	Dominican Republic	3–1	Argentina	22–25	25–11	25–22	25–18		97–76	P2P3
Jul 18	Canada	3–1	Cuba	25–21	19–25	25–18	25–22		94–86	P2P3
Jul 20	Canada	1–3	Argentina	25–23	25–27	20–25	21–25		91–100	P2P3
Jul 20	Dominican Republic	1–3	Cuba	22–25	22–25	25–21	20–25		89–96	P2P3

=== Group B ===
Pos	Team	Pld	W	L	Pts	SPW	SPL	SPR	SW	SL	SR
1	Brazil	3	3	0	10	320	273	1.172	9	5	1.800
2	United States	3	2	1	12	254	200	1.270	8	3	2.667
3	Puerto Rico	3	1	2	7	232	247	0.939	5	6	0.833
4	Peru	3	0	3	1	164	250	0.656	1	9	0.111

Source: Archived 2015-10-20 at the Wayback Machine

Date		Score		Set 1	Set 2	Set 3	Set 4	Set 5	Total	Report
Jul 16	Brazil	3–2	Puerto Rico	23–25	28–26	25–17	24–26	15–10	115–104	P2P3
Jul 16	United States	3–0	Peru	25–15	25–13	25–14			75–42	P2P3
Jul 18	Brazil	3–1	Peru	25–27	25–5	25–17	25–16		100–65	P2P3
Jul 18	United States	3–0	Puerto Rico	25–17	25–22	25–14			75–53	P2P3
Jul 20	Puerto Rico	3–0	Peru	25–18	25–16	25–23			75–57	P2P3
Jul 20	United States	2–3	Brazil	25–22	21–25	25–18	22–25	11–15	104–105	P2P3

== Elimination round ==
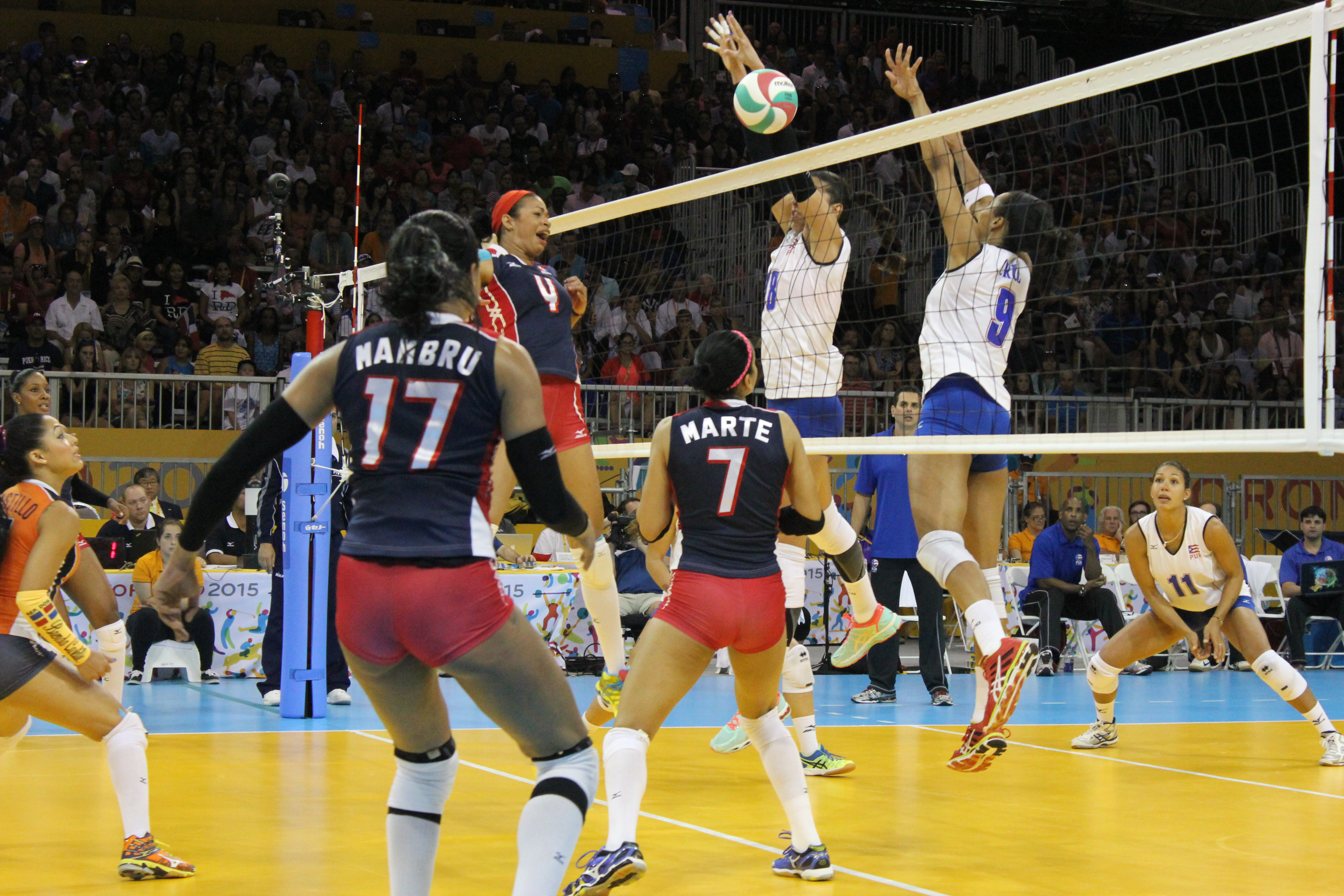
Bronze medal match Dominican R. vs Puerto Rico

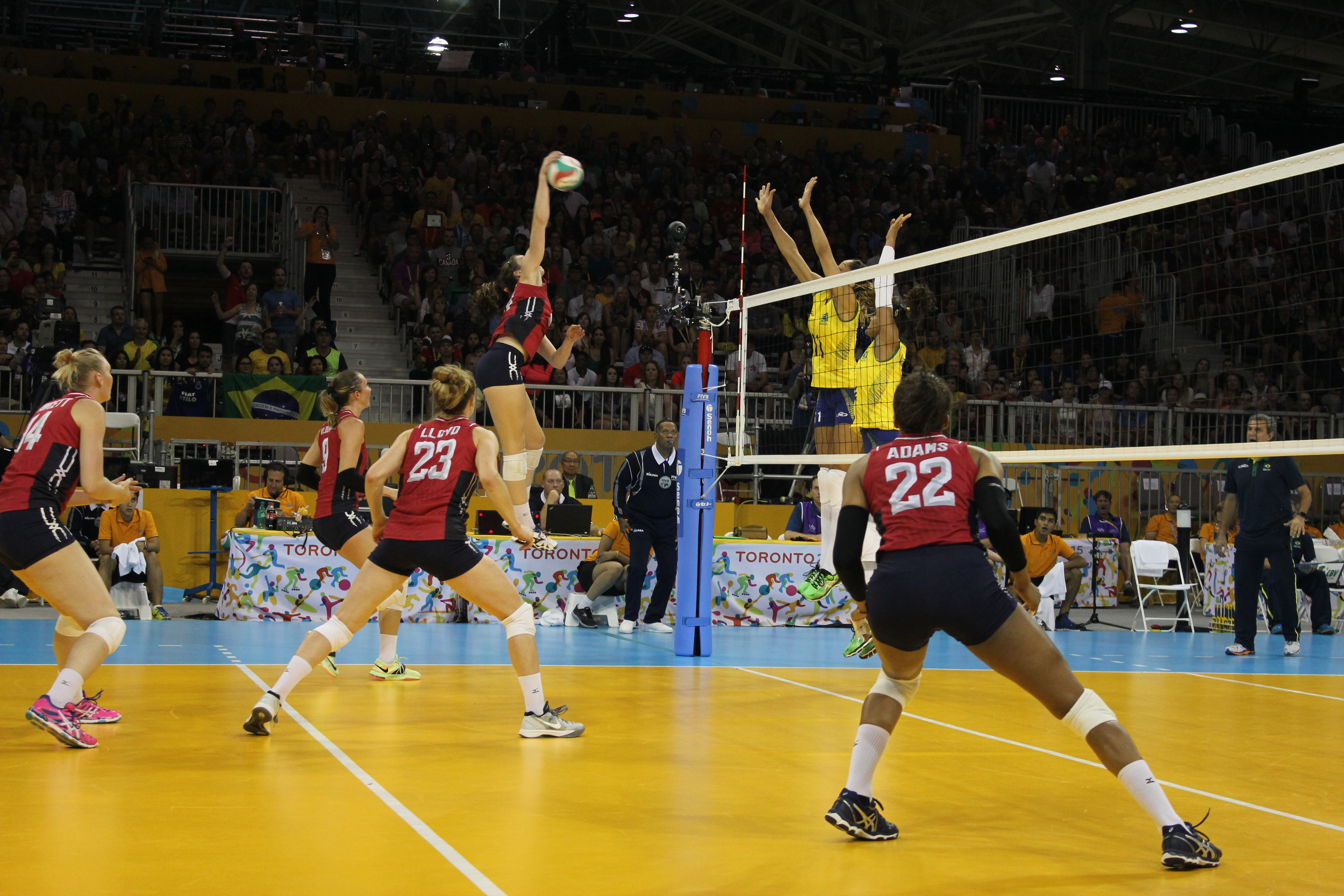
Gold medal match USA vs Brazil

=== Championship bracket ===
Quarterfinals
A2	Argentina	2
B3	Puerto Rico	3
B2	United States	3
A3	Cuba	1

Semifinals
B1	Brazil	3
B3	Puerto Rico	2
A1	Dominican Republic	1
B2	United States	3

Final
B1	Brazil	0
B2	United States	3
Third place
B3	Puerto Rico	1
A1	Dominican Republic	3

=== Quarterfinals ===
Date		Score		Set 1	Set 2	Set 3	Set 4	Set 5	Total	Report
Jul 22	Argentina	2–3	Puerto Rico	21–25	27–25	10–25	25–11	13–15	96–101	P2 P3
Jul 22	United States	3–1	Cuba	25–18	25–19	22–25	25–18		97–80	P2 P3

=== Seventh place match ===
Date		Score		Set 1	Set 2	Set 3	Set 4	Set 5	Total	Report
Jul 23	Canada	2–3	Peru	25–22	24–26	25–17	21–25	13–15	108–105	P2 P3

=== Fifth place match ===
Date		Score		Set 1	Set 2	Set 3	Set 4	Set 5	Total	Report
Jul 23	Argentina	1–3	Cuba	21–25	25–21	17–25	21–25		84–96	P2 P3

=== Semifinals ===
Date		Score		Set 1	Set 2	Set 3	Set 4	Set 5	Total	Report
Jul 23	Brazil	3–2	Puerto Rico	18–25	24–26	25–22	25–19	15–11	107–103	P2 P3
Jul 23	Dominican Republic	1–3	United States	17–25	25–22	18–25	22–25		82–97	P2 P3

=== Bronze medal match ===
Date		Score		Set 1	Set 2	Set 3	Set 4	Set 5	Total	Report
Jul 25	Puerto Rico	1–3	Dominican Republic	22–25	22–25	25–22	21–25		90–97	P2 P3

=== Gold medal match ===
Date		Score		Set 1	Set 2	Set 3	Set 4	Set 5	Total	Report
Jul 25	Brazil	0–3	United States	22–25	21–25	26–28			69–78	P2 P3

== Final standings ==
Rank	Team
1st place, gold medalist(s)	United States
2nd place, silver medalist(s)	Brazil
3rd place, bronze medalist(s)	Dominican Republic
4	Puerto Rico
5	Cuba
6	Argentina
7	Peru
8	Canada

== Awards ==
- Most valuable player
  - Carli Lloyd (USA)
- Best outside hitters
  - Krista Vansant (USA)
  - Melissa Vargas (CUB)
- Best middle blockers
  - Adenízia da Silva (BRA)
  - Rachael Adams (USA)
- Best setter
  - Carli Lloyd (USA)
- Best opposite
  - Nicole Fawcett (USA)
- Best scorer
  - Karina Ocasio (PUR)
- Best server
  - Gina Mambru (DOM)
- Best libero
  - Camila Brait (BRA)
- Best digger
  - Camila Brait (BRA)
- Best receiver
  - Camila Brait (BRA)

== Medalists ==
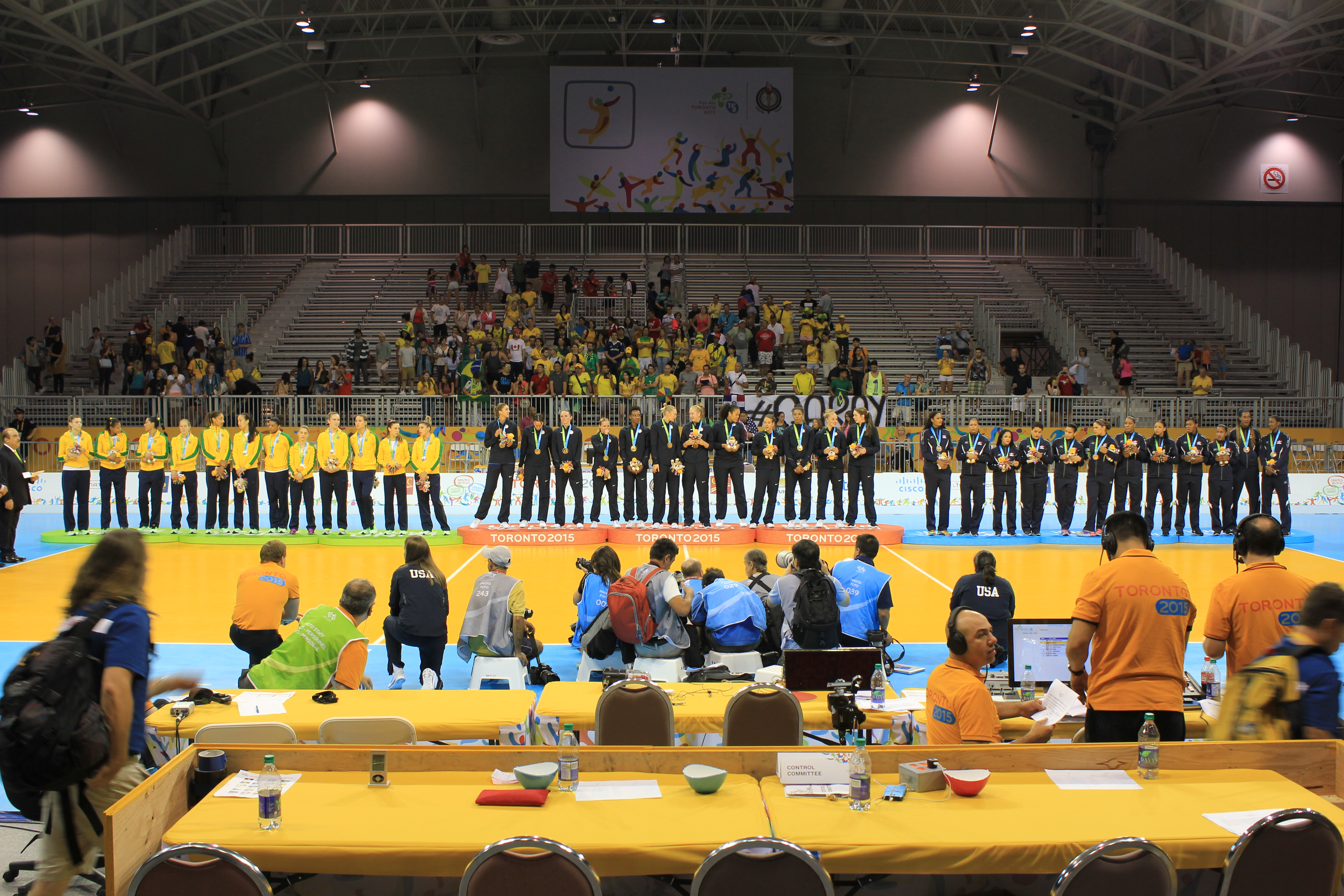
The teams of Brazil, the United States and the Dominican Republic are standing on the podium.

Event	Gold	Silver	Bronze
Women's tournament	United States: Lauren Paolini #4; Cassidy Lichtman #7; Kristin Hildebrand #9; Natalie Hagglund #10; Nicole Fawcett #14; Cursty Jackson #13; Michelle Bartsch #16; Falyn Fonoimoana #17; Jenna Hagglund #20; Rachael Adams #22; Carli Lloyd #23; Krista Vansant #24	Brazil: Rosamaria Montibeller #1; Adenízia da Silva #5; Jaqueline Carvalho #8; Michelle Pavão #9; Joyce da Silva #11; Ana Tiemi #14; Fernanda Garay #16; Camila Brait #18; Angélica Malinverno #21; Mariana Costa #22 / 25; Bárbara Brunch #23; Macris Carneiro #24	Dominican Republic: Annerys Vargas #1; Marianne Fersola #4; Brenda Castillo #5; Camil Domínguez #6; Niverka Marte #7; Prisilla Rivera #14; Yonkaira Peña #16; Gina Mambru #17; Bethania de la Cruz #18; Ana Binet #19; Brayelin Martínez #20; Jineiry Martínez #21
