= Kristin Hildebrand =

American volleyball player

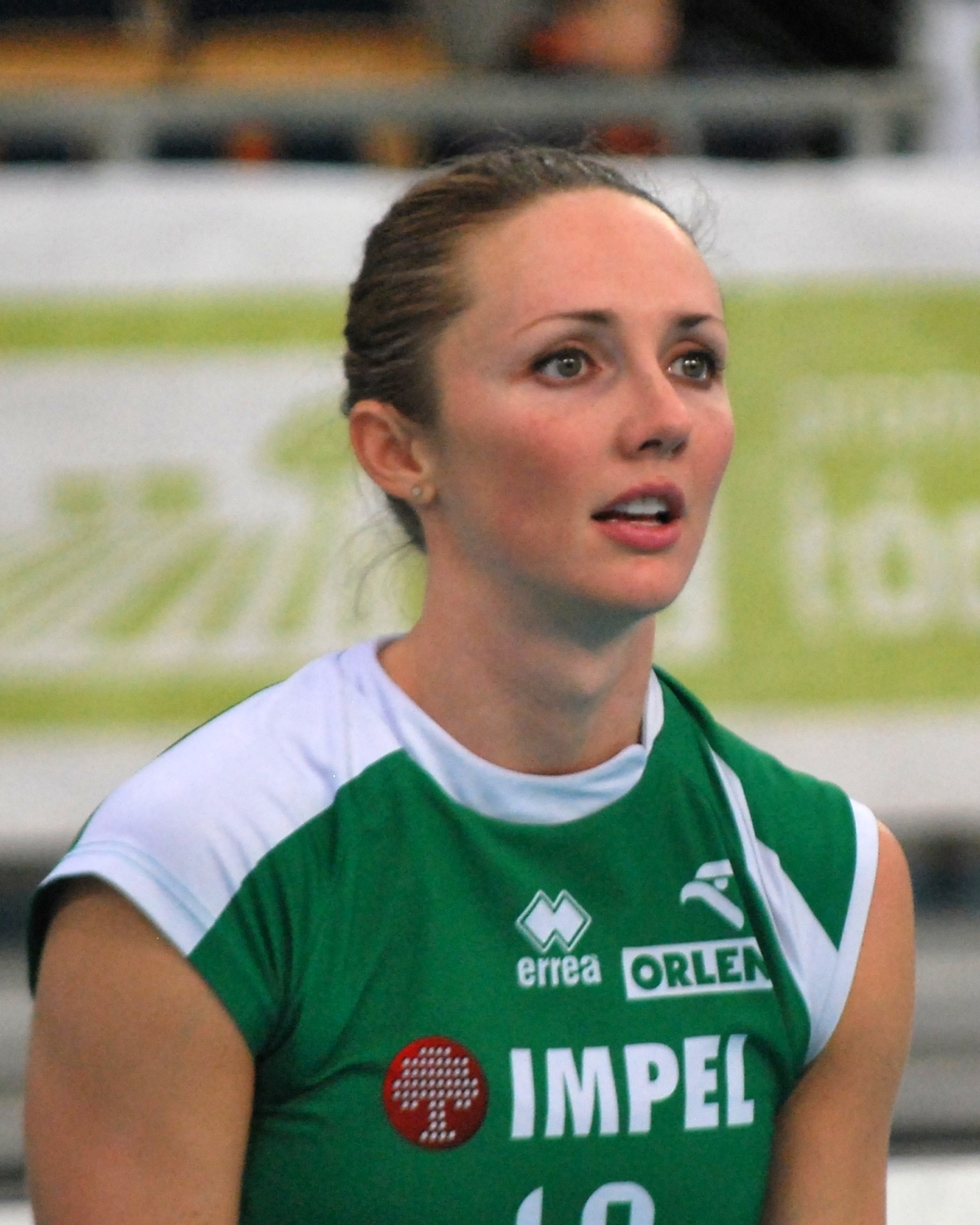

Personal information
- Full name: Kristin Lynn Hildebrand
- Born: Kristin Lynn Richards; June 30, 1985 (age 41); Provo, Utah, U.S.
- Hometown: Provo, Utah, U.S.
- Height: 6 ft 1 in (1.86 m)
- Spike: 120 in (300 cm)
- Block: 112 in (284 cm)
- Education: Stanford

Volleyball information
- Position: Outside hitter
- Current club: Impel Wrocław

National team
2005–2016	United States
Medal record
Women's volleyball
Representing the United States
World Championship
Gold medal – first place	2014 Italy	Team
World Grand Champions Cup
Silver medal – second place	2013 Japan	Team
World Grand Prix
Gold medal – first place	2012 Ningbo	Team
Pan-American Cup
Gold medal – first place	2012 Mexico	Team
Gold medal – first place	2013 Peru	Team
Gold medal – first place	2015 Peru	Team
Pan American Games
Gold medal – first place	2015 Toronto	Team
NORCECA Women's Volleyball Championship
Gold medal – first place	2013 Omaha	Team

Kristin Lynn Hildebrand (née Richards, born June 30, 1985) is an American indoor volleyball player. She was on the United States national team that won the 2014 World Championship gold medal.

== Career ==
She played college women's volleyball at Stanford University.

Hildebrand was part of the USA national team that won the 2014 World Championship gold medal when the team defeated China 3-1 in the final match.

== Clubs ==
- (Russia) Fakel Novy Urengoy (2008–09)
- (Russia) Omichka Omsk (2009–10)
- (Azerbaijan) Lokomotiv Baku (2010–11)
- (Italy) Spes Volley Conegliano (2011)
- (Italy) River Volley Piacenza (2012)
- (Turkey) Yeşilyurt Istanbul (2012–13)
- (Brazil) Campinas Vôlei (2013–14)
- (Turkey) Fenerbahçe Istanbul (2014–15)
- (Poland) Impel Wroclaw (2015–2016)

== Awards ==
=== College ===
- 2004 NCAA – Champion with Stanford
- 2006 NCAA – Runner-Up with Stanford

=== Clubs ===
- 2010–11 Challenge Cup – Runner-Up with Lokomotiv Baku
- 2014–15 Turkish Cup – Champion with Fenerbahçe Grundig
- 2014–15 Turkish Women's Volleyball League – Champion, with Fenerbahçe Grundig
- 2015–16 Polish ORLEN Liga – Bronze medal, with Impel Wroclaw
