= Camil Domínguez =

Dominican Republic volleyball player (born 1991)

Personal information
- Full name: Camil Inmaculada Dominguez Martinez
- Born: 7 December 1991 (age 34); Santo Domingo, Dominican Republic
- Height: 1.76 m (5 ft 9 in)
- Weight: 75 kg (165 lb)
- Spike: 232 cm (91 in)
- Block: 275 cm (108 in)
- Education: Lee University

Volleyball information
- Position: Setter
- Number: 6

Career
Years	Teams
2014	Mirador

National team
2006–2021	Dominican Republic
Honours
Women's volleyball
Representing the Dominican Republic
Pan American Games
Gold medal – first place	2019 Lima	Team
Bronze medal – third place	2015 Toronto	Team
Pan-American Cup
Silver medal – second place	2018 Santo Domingo	Team
- Last updated: 29 August 2021

Camil Inmaculada Domínguez Martínez (Note: In this Spanish name, the first or paternal surname is Domínguez and the second or maternal family name is Martínez.) (born 7 December 1991) is a Dominican Republic volleyball player. She plays for the Dominican Republic women's national volleyball team.

She participated in the 2015 FIVB Volleyball World Grand Prix. With her club Mirador she competed at the 2015 FIVB Volleyball Women's Club World Championship.
