= Angélica Malinverno =

Brazilian volleyball player (born 1989)

Angelica Malinverno
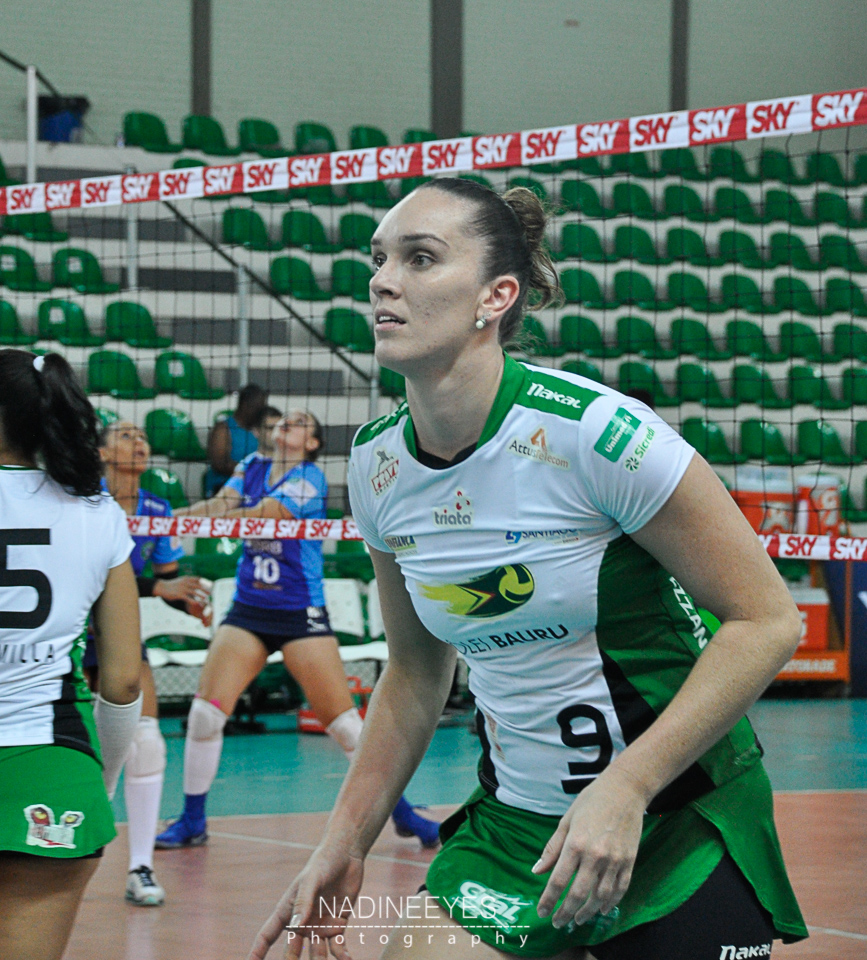

Personal information
- Full name: Angelica Malinverno
- Nationality: Brazilian
- Born: 5 July 1989 (age 37); Caxias do Sul, Rio Grande do Sul
- Height: 1.89 m (74 in)
- Weight: 78 kg (172 lb)
- Spike: 295 cm (116 in)
- Block: 290 cm (114 in)

Volleyball information
- Position: Middle Blocker
- Current club: Praia Clube

National team
2014–2015	Brazil
Honours
Women's volleyball
Representing Brazil
Silver medal – second place	2015 Toronto	Team

Angélica Malinverno (born 5 July 1989) is a Brazilian female volleyball player.

She won with the Brazil national team the silver medal, in the 2015 Pan American Games. She participated in the 2014 FIVB Volleyball World Grand Prix. On club level she played for Brasília Vôlei in 2014.

== Clubs ==
- (Brazil) Osasco Vôlei (2005–2008)
- (Brazil) Praia Clube (2008–2012)
- (Brazil) Vôlei Amil/Campinas (2012–2014)
- (Brazil) Brasília Vôlei (2014–2015)
- (Brazil) SESI-SP (2015–2016)
- (Brazil) Vôlei Bauru (2016–2018)
- (Brazil) Brasília Vôlei (2018–2019)
- (Brazil) Praia Clube (2019–)
- (Peru) Universitario de Deportes (2025–)
