= Lauren Paolini =

American volleyball player (born 1987)

Lauren (Paolini) Gullett
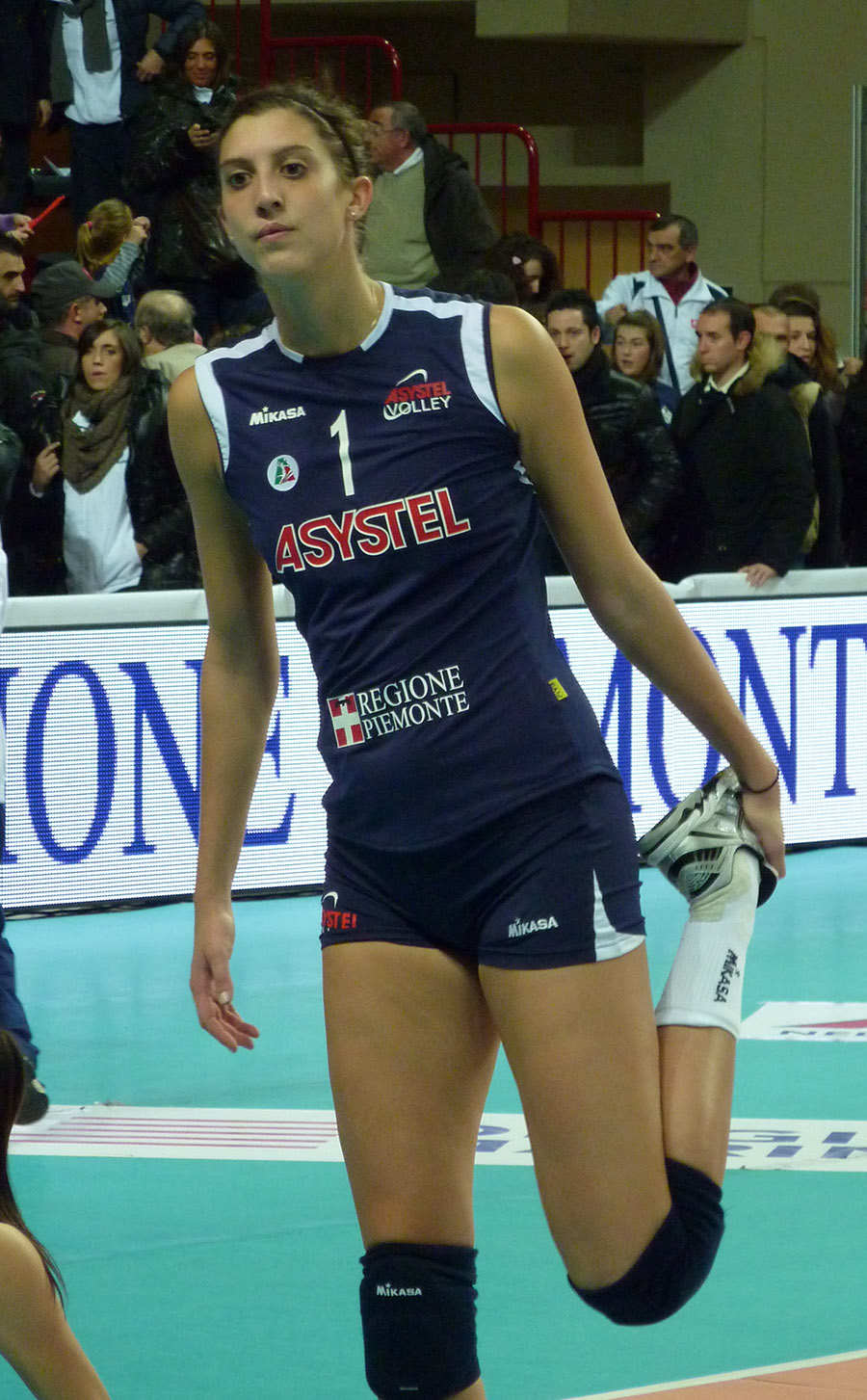

Personal information
- Nationality: American
- Born: August 22, 1987 (age 39)
- Height: 6 ft 4 in (193 cm)
- Weight: 161 lb (73 kg)
- Spike: 125 in (317 cm)
- Block: 118 in (299 cm)
- Education: Texas

Volleyball information
- Position: middle blocker
- Number: 13

National team
2010	United States
Medal record
Women's volleyball
Representing the United States
Pan American Games
Gold medal – first place	2015 Toronto	Team

Lauren Paolini (born August 22, 1987) is an American retired volleyball player. She was part of the United States national team in the 2010 FIVB World Championship and she also won the gold medal in the 2015 Pan American Games. She played with University of Texas at Austin.
