= Cursty Jackson =

American volleyball player (born 1990)

- Jackson, fifth from the left, gold medalist with United States national team 2015

Personal information
- Nationality: American
- Born: September 11, 1990 (age 36)
- Education: University of Nevada, Las Vegas
- Height: 6 ft 2 in (1.88 m)
- Weight: 157 lb (71 kg)
- Spike: 130 in (320 cm)
- Block: 120 in (310 cm)

Volleyball information

National team
- Years: Team
- 2009–: United States

Cursty Jackson (born September 11, 1990) is an American female former volleyball player and current college volleyball coach. She is currently an assistant coach of the Long Beach State women's volleyball team.

== Career ==
She was member of the United States national team that won the 2015 Pan American Games gold medal, the 2013 FIVB Volleyball World Grand Prix, and the 2013 FIVB Women's World Grand Champions Cup.

On the college level, she played for University of Nevada, Las Vegas.

On the club level she played for Galatasaray in 2013.

== Personal life ==
She is married to French volleyball player Kévin Le Roux.
