= 2015 Women's Pan-American Volleyball Cup =

Tournament details
- Host country: Peru
- Dates: 13–21 June
- Teams: 12
- Venues: 2 (in Lima and Callao host cities)

Final positions
- Champions: United States (4th title)

Tournament awards
- MVP: Krista Vansant (USA)

The 2015 Pan-American Volleyball Cup was the fourteenth edition of the annual women's volleyball tournament, played by twelve countries over June, 2014 in Lima and Callao, Peru. The competition served as a qualifier for the 2016 FIVB World Grand Prix. The United States won their fourth championship defeating 3–0 to the Dominican Republic and the American Krista Vansant won the Most Valuable Player of the tournament.

== Competing nations ==
Group A (CALLAO)	Group B (LIMA)
Argentina; Colombia; Costa Rica; Mexico; Puerto Rico; United States	Brazil; Canada; Cuba; Dominican Republic; Peru; Uruguay

== Qualification for FIVB Grand Prix ==
The top two teams from the NORCECA confederation and the top from CSV will play first group from the 2016 FIVB World Grand Prix. The third, fourth and fifth ranked teams from NORCECA and the second best ranked from CSV will play the second group. The third ranked from CSV and the sixth from NORCECA will take part in the third group.

== Pool standing procedure ==
Match won 3–0: 5 points for the winner, 0 point for the loser
Match won 3–1: 4 points for the winner, 1 points for the loser
Match won 3–2: 3 points for the winner, 2 points for the loser
In case of tie, the teams were classified according to the following criteria:
points ratio and sets ratio

== Preliminary round ==
=== Group A ===
Pos	Team	Pld	W	L	Pts	SPW	SPL	SPR	SW	SL	SR	Qualification
1	United States	5	5	0	24	173	123	1.407	15	1	15.000	Semifinals
2	Argentina	5	4	1	15	174	129	1.349	12	8	1.500	Quarterfinals
3	Puerto Rico	5	3	2	17	146	159	0.918	11	6	1.833	Quarterfinals
4	Colombia	5	2	3	13	122	108	1.130	9	9	1.000	
5	Mexico	5	1	4	6	137	172	0.797	4	12	0.333	
6	Costa Rica	5	0	5	0	86	152	0.566	0	15	0.000	

Date	Time		Score		Set 1	Set 2	Set 3	Set 4	Set 5	Total	Report
13 June	15:00	Argentina	3–0	Costa Rica	25–14	25–14	27–25			77–53	P2P3
13 June	17:00	Mexico	0–3	Colombia	20–25	21–25	20–25			61–75	P2P3
13 June	19:00	United States	3–0	Puerto Rico	25–22	25–12	25–18			75–52	P2P3
14 June	15:00	Colombia	1–3	United States	21–25	9–25	25–23	16–25		71–98	P2P3
14 June	17:00	Costa Rica	0–3	Puerto Rico	9–25	14–25	10–25			33–75	P2P3
14 June	19:00	Argentina	3–1	Mexico	25–20	25–13	22–25	25–18		97–76	P2P3
15 June	15:00	United States	3–0	Costa Rica	25–11	25–9	25–5			75–25	P2P3
15 June	17:00	Colombia	2–3	Argentina	25–20	19–25	25–20	18–25	12–15	99–105	P2P3
15 June	19:00	Puerto Rico	3–0	Mexico	25–20	26–24	25–22			76–66	P2P3
16 June	15:00	Costa Rica	0–3	Colombia	18–25	23–25	14–25			55–75	P2P3
16 June	17:00	Mexico	0–3	United States	13–25	17–25	17–25			47–75	P2P3
16 June	19:00	Puerto Rico	2–3	Argentina	22–25	20–25	25–22	25–22	10–15	102–109	P2P3
17 June	15:00	Mexico	3–0	Costa Rica	25–15	25–20	25–20			75–55	P2P3
17 June	17:00	Colombia	0–3	Puerto Rico	22–25	16–25	21–25			59–75	P2P3
17 June	19:00	Argentina	0–3	United States	18–25	18–25	11–25			47–75	P2P3

=== Group B ===
Pos	Team	Pld	W	L	Pts	SPW	SPL	SPR	SW	SL	SR	Qualification
1	Dominican Republic	5	5	0	21	172	115	1.496	15	4	3.750	Semifinals
2	Cuba	5	4	1	19	173	137	1.263	13	5	2.600	Quarterfinals
3	Canada	5	3	2	13	183	165	1.109	9	8	1.125	Quarterfinals
4	Brazil	5	2	3	16	201	206	0.976	12	9	1.333	
5	Peru	5	1	4	6	146	172	0.849	4	12	0.333	
6	Uruguay	5	0	5	0	70	150	0.467	0	15	0.000	

Date	Time		Score		Set 1	Set 2	Set 3	Set 4	Set 5	Total	Report
13 June	14:30	Dominican Republic	3–0	Uruguay	25–10	25–14	25–8			75–32	P2P3
13 June	17:00	Peru	0–3	Cuba	21–25	20–25	22–25			63–75	P2P3
13 June	19:30	Brazil	2–3	Canada	25–15	14–25	25–15	26–28	9–15	99–98	P2P3
14 June	14:00	Canada	3–0	Uruguay	25–16	25–9	25–13			75–38	P2P3
14 June	16:30	Cuba	3–2	Brazil	25–15	25–23	20–25	22–25	16–14	108–102	P2P3
14 June	19:00	Peru	1–3	Dominican Republic	18–25	20–25	25–22	20–25		83–97	P2P3
15 June	14:00	Brazil	3–0	Uruguay	25–15	25–13	25–14			75–42	P2P3
15 June	16:30	Cuba	1–3	Dominican Republic	27–25	14–25	22–25	21–25		84–100	P2P3
15 June	19:00	Peru	0–3	Canada	18–25	21–25	15–25			54–75	P2P3
16 June	14:00	Cuba	3–0	Uruguay	25–16	25–5	25–20			75–41	P2P3
16 June	16:30	Dominican Republic	3–0	Canada	25–19	25–22	26–24			76–65	P2P3
16 June	19:00	Peru	0–3	Brazil	28–30	20–25	20–25			68–80	P2P3
17 June	14:00	Canada	0–3	Cuba	21–25	20–25	20–25			61–75	P2P3
17 June	16:30	Dominican Republic	3–2	Brazil	16–25	18–25	25–17	25–16	15–10	99–93	P2P3
17 June	19:00	Peru	3–0	Uruguay	25–12	25–8	25–10			75–30	P2P3

== Final round ==
=== Championship bracket ===
Quarterfinals
B2	Cuba	3
A3	Puerto Rico	2
A2	Argentina	3
B3	Canada	1

Semifinals
A1	United States	3
B2	Cuba	0
B1	Dominican Republic	3
A2	Argentina	1
Classification 5–6
B3	Canada	3
A3	Puerto Rico	1

Finals
A1	United States	3
B1	Dominican Republic	0
Classification 3–4
B2	Cuba	0
A2	Argentina	3

=== 7th to 10th places bracket ===
Classification 7–10
B4	Brazil	3
A5	Mexico	0
A4	Colombia	3
B5	Peru	2

Classification 7–8
B4	Brazil	3
A4	Colombia	0
Classification 9–10
A5	Mexico	2
B5	Peru	3

=== Classification 11–12 ===
Date	Time		Score		Set 1	Set 2	Set 3	Set 4	Set 5	Total	Report
19 June	14:00	Costa Rica	3–1	Uruguay	22–25	25–21	25–18	25–21		97–85	P2P3

=== Classification 7–10 ===
Date	Time		Score		Set 1	Set 2	Set 3	Set 4	Set 5	Total	Report
19 June	16:30	Brazil	3–0	Mexico	25–19	25–17	25–21			75–57	P2P3
19 June	19:00	Colombia	3–2	Peru	19–25	23–25	25–20	25–23	15–11	107–104	P2P3

=== Quarterfinals ===
Date	Time		Score		Set 1	Set 2	Set 3	Set 4	Set 5	Total	Report
19 June	16:00	Argentina	3–1	Canada	25–20	25–20	23–25	25–21		98–86	P2P3
19 June	18:00	Cuba	3–2	Puerto Rico	25–19	23–25	29–27	23–25	16–14	116–110	P2P3

=== Classification 9–10 ===
Date	Time		Score		Set 1	Set 2	Set 3	Set 4	Set 5	Total	Report
20 June	17:00	Mexico	2–3	Peru	22–25	25–20	20–25	25–18	15–17	107–105	P2P3

=== Classification 5–8 ===
Date	Time		Score		Set 1	Set 2	Set 3	Set 4	Set 5	Total	Report
20 June	17:00	Colombia	1–3	Canada	20–25	25–17	19–25	9–25		73–92	P2P3
20 June	19:00	Brazil	1–3	Puerto Rico	25–19	9–25	21–25	21–25		76–94	P2P3

=== Classification 7–8 ===
Date	Time		Score		Set 1	Set 2	Set 3	Set 4	Set 5	Total	Report
21 June	15:00	Colombia	0–3	Brazil	22–25	23–25	15–25			60–75	P2P3

=== Classification 5–6 ===
Date	Time		Score		Set 1	Set 2	Set 3	Set 4	Set 5	Total	Report
21 June	17:00	Canada	3–1	Puerto Rico	25–21	25–23	20–25	25–23		95–92	P2P3

=== Semifinals ===
Date	Time		Score		Set 1	Set 2	Set 3	Set 4	Set 5	Total	Report
20 June	14:30	United States	3–0	Cuba	25–17	25–20	25–22			75–59	P2P3
20 June	19:00	Dominican Republic	3–1	Argentina	25–23	25–20	23–25	25–21		98–89	P2P3

=== Classification 3–4 ===
Date	Time		Score		Set 1	Set 2	Set 3	Set 4	Set 5	Total	Report
21 June	17:00	Cuba	0–3	Argentina	23–25	23–25	20–25			66–75	P2P3

=== Final ===
Date	Time		Score		Set 1	Set 2	Set 3	Set 4	Set 5	Total	Report
21 June	19:00	United States	3–0	Dominican Republic	25–20	25–20	25–15			75–55	P2P3

== Final standing ==
Rank	Team
1st place, gold medalist(s)	United States
2nd place, silver medalist(s)	Dominican Republic
3rd place, bronze medalist(s)	Argentina
4	Cuba
5	Canada
6	Puerto Rico
7	Brazil
8	Colombia
9	Peru
10	Mexico
11	Costa Rica
12	Uruguay

2015 Women's Pan-American Cup champions

United States
4th title

== Individual awards ==
- Most valuable player
  (United States) Krista Vansant
- Best setter
  (United States) Carli Lloyd
- Best Outside Hitters
  (United States) Krista Vansant
  (Cuba) Melissa Vargas
- Best Middle Blockers
  (Cuba) Alena Rojas
  (Canada) Lucille Charuk
- Best Opposite
  (Peru) Ángela Leyva
- Best scorer
  (Cuba) Melissa Vargas
- Best server
  (Cuba) Melissa Vargas
- Best libero
  (Dominican Republic) Brenda Castillo
- Best digger
  (Dominican Republic) Brenda Castillo
- Best receiver
  (Dominican Republic) Brenda Castillo
