= List of 2019 World Beach Games medal winners =

The 2019 World Beach Games were held in Doha, Qatar, from 12 to 16 October 2019.

== 3x3 basketball ==
Event	Gold	Silver	Bronze
Men	Russia; Ivan Khramov; Daniil Abramovskii; Vasilii Berdnikov; Dmitrii Cheburkin	Brazil; William Weihermann; Leonardo Branquinho; Fabrício Veríssimo; Matheus Leite	Mongolia; Gantsolmongiin Gan-Erdene; Ariunboldyn Anand; Chuluunbaataryn Ikhbayar; Batsaikhany Altangerel
Women	France; Diaba Konaté; Marie-Paule Foppossi; Maëva Djaldi-Tabdi; Johanna Muzet	Netherlands; Myrthe den Heeten; Esther Fokke; Fleur Kuijt; Charlotte van Kleef	China; Zhang Lingge; Wang Haimei; Pan Xuemei; Ha Wenxi

== 4x4 beach volleyball ==
Event	Gold	Silver	Bronze
Men	United States; Brian Cook; Taylor Crabb; Maddison McKibbin; Troy Field; Riley McKibbin; Casey Patterson	Qatar; Cherif Younousse; Ahmed Tijan; Saifeddine El-Majid; Nasser Nabeel Ali; Ziad Benlouaer; Denis Messelmani	Indonesia; I Ketut Ardana; Rendy Verdian Licardo; Yosi Ariel Firnanda; Tio Kesuma Sentosa; Gunawan Dewantoro; Yogi Hermawan
Women	United States; Karissa Cook; Geena Urango; Emily Hartong; Kelly Reeves; Katie Spieler; Allie Wheeler	Brazil; Fernanda Alves; Bárbara Seixas; Rebecca Cavalcante; Tainá Bigi; Juliana Silva; Carolina Horta	Canada; Tori Cowley; Charlotte Sider; Kerri Battiston; Rachel Cockrell; Megan Nagy; Camille Saxton

== Aquathlon ==
Event	Gold	Silver	Bronze
Men's individual	Kevin Viñuela; Spain	Márk Dévay; Hungary	Rostyslav Pevtsov; Azerbaijan
Women's individual	Francisca Tous; Spain	Kseniia Levkovska; Azerbaijan	Antoanela Manac; Romania
Mixed relay	Spain; Francisca Tous; Kevin Viñuela	Azerbaijan; Kseniia Levkovska; Rostyslav Pevtsov	Hungary; Márta Kropkó; Márk Dévay

== Beach handball ==
Event	Gold	Silver	Bronze
Men	Brazil; Cristiano Rossa; Nailson Amaral; Bruno Oliveira; Matheus Medeiros; Gil Pires; Thiago Barcellos; Marcelo Tuller; Diogo Vieira; Wellington Esteves; João Paulo Sousa	Spain; Elhji Touré; Alberto Castro; Gonzalo Cervera; Adriá Ortolá; Antonio Jesús Espada; Antonio Varo; Juan Antonio Vázquez; Ramón Fuentes; Ricardo Amérigo; Domingo Jesús Luis	Sweden; August Elmberg; Hampus Dahlqvist; Fredrik Suneson; Jesper Knutsson; Erik Wessberg; Magnus Jönsson; Henrik Dahlberg; Niklas Ekberg; Rasmus Dovsjö; Martin Käck
Women	Denmark; Laura Askvist; Anna Lillesø; Line Gyldenløve; Rikke Enevoldsen; Camilla Fangel; Melanie Fuglsbjerg; Frederikke Lærke; Ann Cecilie Møller; Maria Krogh Holm; Maria-Teresa Faurhøj	Hungary; Renáta Csiki; Emese Tóth; Ágnes Győri; Evelin Speth; Sára Sütő; Fruzsina Kretz; Réka Király; Ramóna Vártok; Gabriella Landi; Luca Vajda	Brazil; Ingrid Frazão; Camila Souza; Beatriz Cruz; Renata Santiago; Juliana Oliveira; Jéssica Barros; Cinthya Piquet; Carolina Braz; Patrícia Scheppa; Gabriela Messias

== Beach soccer ==
Event	Gold	Silver	Bronze
Men	Brazil; Mão; Rafinha; Antônio; Catarino; Filipe Silva; Lucão; Bokinha; Rodrigo Souto; Rodrigo; Datinha; Mauricinho; Rafael Padilha	Russia; Ivan Ostrovskii; Andrey Novikov; Aleksey Makarov; Yuri Krasheninnikov; Dmitry Shishin; Anton Shkarin; Aleksei Pavlenko; Artur Paporotnyi; Kirill Romanov; Pavel Bazhenov; Boris Nikonorov; Fedor Zemskov	Iran; Peyman Hosseini; Amir Hossein Akbari; Hassan Abdollahi; Mostafa Kiani; Mehdi Shirmohammadi; Ali Mirshekari; Mohammad Ali Mokhtari; Mohammad Ahmadzadeh; Hamid Behzadpour; Saeid Piramoun; Hadi Farahmand; Mohammad Masoumizadeh
Women	Spain; Laura Gallego; Andrea Mirón; Carmen Fresneda; Lorena Asensio; Alba Mellado; Sara Gozález; Carolina Gozález; Jessica Higueras; Carla Morera; Laia García	Great Britain; Hannah Haughton; Katie James; Nadine Bazan; Hannah Short; Wendy Martin; Sarah Kempson; Rebecca Barron; Gemma Hillier; Molly Clark; Charlotte Haynes	Brazil; Natalie Wippel; Adriele Rocha; Jasna Nagel; Nayara Couto; Bárbara Colodetti; Noele Bastos; Lorena Medeiros; Letícia Villar; Dani Barboza; Letícia Lopes

== Beach tennis ==
Event	Gold	Silver	Bronze
Men's doubles	Spain; Antonio Ramos; Gerard Rodríguez	Brazil; André Baran; Vinícius Font	Russia; Nikita Burmakin; Sergey Kuptsov
Women's doubles	Italy; Flaminia Daina; Nicole Nobile	Brazil; Joana Cortez; Rafaella Miiller	Russia; Daria Churakova; Irina Glimakova
Mixed doubles	Brazil; André Baran; Rafaella Miiller	France; Nicolas Gianotti; Marie-Eve Hoarau	Brazil; Vinícius Font; Joana Cortez

== Beach wrestling ==
Event	Gold	Silver	Bronze
Men's 70 kg	Levan Kelekhsashvili; Georgia	Panah Ilyasli; Azerbaijan	Ștefan Coman; Romania
Men's 80 kg	Davit Khutsishvili; Georgia	Ibrahim Yusubov; Azerbaijan	Vasyl Mykhailov; Ukraine
Men's 90 kg	Muhammad Inam; Pakistan	Dato Marsagishvili; Georgia	Pedro García; Spain
Men's +90 kg	Ufuk Yılmaz; Turkey	Mamuka Kordzaia; Georgia	Oyan Nazariani; Azerbaijan
Women's 50 kg	Kamila Barbosa; Brazil	Miglena Selishka; Bulgaria	Ștefania Priceputu; Romania
Women's 60 kg	Francesca Indelicato; Italy	Mehlika Öztürk; Turkey	Shauna Kemp; United States
Women's 70 kg	Tatiana Rentería; Colombia	Alina Berezhna; Ukraine	Adina Popescu; Romania
Women's +70 kg	Blessing Onyebuchi; Nigeria	Zsanett Németh; Hungary	Iryna Pasichnyk; Ukraine

== Karate ==
Event	Gold	Silver	Bronze
Men's individual kata	Damián Quintero; Spain	Wang Yi-ta; Chinese Taipei	Gakuji Tozaki; United States
Men's individual kata	Damián Quintero; Spain	Wang Yi-ta; Chinese Taipei	Antonio Díaz; Venezuela
Women's individual kata	Sandra Sánchez; Spain	Fatemeh Sadeghi; Iran	María Dimitrova; Dominican Republic
Women's individual kata	Sandra Sánchez; Spain	Fatemeh Sadeghi; Iran	Grace Lau; Hong Kong

== Open water swimming ==
Event	Gold	Silver	Bronze
Men's 5 km	Marcello Guidi; Italy	Denis Adeev; Russia	Sören Meißner; Germany
Women's 5 km	Ana Marcela Cunha; Brazil	Hou Yawen; China	Leonie Beck; Germany

== Sailing ==
Event	Gold	Silver	Bronze
Men's KiteFoil	Florian Gruber; Germany	Nicolas Parlier; France	Guy Bridge; Great Britain
Women's KiteFoil	Daniela Moroz; United States	Julia Damasiewicz; Poland	Elena Kalinina; Russia

== Skateboarding ==
Event	Gold	Silver	Bronze
Men's park	Heimana Reynolds; United States	Steven Piñeiro; Puerto Rico	Alessandro Mazzara; Italy
Women's park	Sakura Yosozumi; Japan	Kihana Ogawa; Japan	Julia Benedetti; Spain

== Sport climbing ==
Event	Gold	Silver	Bronze
Men's bouldering	Kai Harada; Japan	Keita Watabe; Japan	Philipp Martin; Germany
Women's bouldering	Miho Nonaka; Japan	Petra Klingler; Switzerland	Urška Repušič; Slovenia

== Water skiing ==
Event	Gold	Silver	Bronze
Men's jump	Vladimir Ryanzin; Russia	Stepan Shpak; Belarus	Emile Ritter; Chile
Men's wakeboarding	Massimiliano Piffaretti; Italy	Cory Teunissen; Australia	Guenther Oka; United States
Women's jump	Aliaksandra Danisheuskaya; Belarus	Jutta Menestrina; Finland	Hanna Straltsova; Belarus
Women's wakeboarding	Sanne Meijer; Netherlands	Alice Virag; Italy	Jamie Lopina; United States
