= Kiteboarding at the 2019 World Beach Games =

World Beach Games competitions

- Venue: Katara Beach
- Dates: 13–16 October
- Competitors: 40 from 23 nations

Kiteboarding competitions at the 2019 World Beach Games in Doha, Qatar were held from 13 to 16 October 2019.

== Medal summary ==
=== Medal table ===
Rank	Nation	Gold	Silver	Bronze	Total
1	Germany	1	0	0	1
1	United States	1	0	0	1
3	France	0	1	0	1
3	Poland	0	1	0	1
5	Great Britain	0	0	1	1
5	Russia	0	0	1	1
Totals (6 entries)		2	2	2	6

=== Medalists ===
Event	Gold	Silver	Bronze
Men's kitefoil racing	Florian Gruber; Germany	Nicolas Parlier; France	Guy Bridge; Great Britain
Women's kitefoil racing	Daniela Moroz; United States	Julia Damasiewicz; Poland	Elena Kalinina; Russia

== Participating nations ==
- Australia (2)
- Brazil (2)
- Bulgaria (1)
- China (1)
- Colombia (1)
- Croatia (2)
- Denmark (2)
- France (3)
- Germany (2)
- Great Britain (2)
- Italy (1)
- Mauritius (1)
- Netherlands (1)
- New Zealand (2)
- Poland (3)
- Russia (2)
- Singapore (1)
- Slovenia (1)
- Spain (1)
- Thailand (1)
- Turkey (1)
- United States (3)
- Uruguay (1)
