= World Beach Games =

International multi-sport event organized

The ANOC World Beach Games, known simply as the World Beach Games, is an international multi-sport event organized by the Association of National Olympic Committees (ANOC). The games are held biennially in odd-numbered years, with a focus on non-Olympic beach and water sports and a primary target audience of 15 to 35 year olds. It was first held in 2019 in Doha, Qatar.

== History ==
The World Beach Games was first announced as a joint project between ANOC and SportAccord in October 2013. It was inspired by the success of the regional Asian Beach Games first held five years prior. Original plans conceived the Games as a 20–25 discipline event, attracting ~5,000 athletes from all 206 National Olympic Committees (NOCs) at a cost of $135 million, and would occur biennially. The concept was approved by the ANOC General Assembly in Bangkok, Thailand in November 2014.

Relations between SportAccord and ANOC quickly soured however, and the former unilaterally announced in April 2015 that Sochi, Russia would host the first edition of the Games, more than likely without any involvement from ANOC; the latter then revealed plans for their own, completely independent version of the Games. Shortly after, SportAccord's scheme collapsed, leaving ANOC as the sole organisation moving forward with any such event and opened the application process in the July.

In October 2015, San Diego, United States was approved as hosts of the inaugural edition at ANOC's General Assembly meeting in Washington, D.C. It was scheduled to take place in 2017. In August 2016, it was postponed by two years to 2019; officially, it was delayed to allow "stakeholders to deliver the best possible event" and give NOCs the "optimum time to prepare their athletes". The scope of the event was substantially scaled-back for the new date, now to feature around 15 disciplines, with thousands fewer athletes and many fewer NOCs set to attend, for a tremendously reduced cost of $40 million. But in May 2019, just five months before it was due to start, the event was pulled out of San Diego. The local organising committee (LOC) had been unable to raise the capital needed to stage the event. Within weeks, the event was relocated to Doha, Qatar after a deal was signed with the Qatari Government to secure funding. This gave Doha a mere four months to prepare for the Games. Despite the short timeframe, the first edition of the Games was finally realised there on schedule in October, with Spain topping the medals table, followed by Brazil in second, and both Italy and the United States tied for third; hosts Qatar finished with one medal (silver). ANOC declared the event a success.

Bidding for the second edition of the Games, to be held in 2021, opened in January 2020. However, in May 2020, following the outbreak and subsequent effects of the COVID-19 pandemic, a decision was made by ANOC to postpone the next edition of the Games to 2023. Its hosts, Bali, Indonesia, were appointed in June 2022. However, in July 2023, less than a month before the games were due to start, the event was cancelled due to Indonesia's withdrawal as host at short notice, apparently due to the government not releasing the necessary funds.

== List of World Beach Games ==
| Edition | Year | Host city | Host country | Opened by | Start date | End date | Nations | Competitors | Sports | Events | Top-ranked team | Ref. |
|---|---|---|---|---|---|---|---|---|---|---|---|---|
| I | 2019 | Doha | Qatar | Emir Tamim bin Hamad Al Thani | 12 October | 16 October | 97 | 1,237 | 13 | 36 | Spain | |
| II | 2023 | Bali | Indonesia | Cancelled | | | | | | | | |
| III | 2027 | Đà Nẵng | Vietnam | expected | 15 November | 23 November | | | | | | |
| IV | 2031 | Rio de Janeiro | Brazil | expected | 03 December | 10 December | | | | | | |
| V | 2035 | Victoria | Seychelles | expected | | | | | | | | |

== Sports ==
| Sport (Discipline) | Body | 2019 |
|---|---|---|
| Badminton (Air badminton) | BWF | — |
| Basketball (3x3 basketball) | FIBA | 2 |
| Football (Beach soccer) | FIFA | 2 |
| Handball (Beach handball) | IHF | 2 |
| Karate (Kata) | WKF | 2 |
| Rowing (Beach sprint) | WR | — |
| Sailing (Kiteboarding) | WSailing | 2 |
| Sailing (Kitefoiling) | WSailing | — |
| Skateboarding (Park) | WSkate | 2 |
| Sport Climbing (Bouldering) | IFSC | 2 |
| Surfing (Longboard surfing) | ISA | — |
| Surfing (Shortboard surfing) | ISA | — |
| Swimming (Open water swimming) | WA | 2 |
| Tennis (Beach tennis) | ITF | 3 |
| Triathlon (Aquathlon) | WT | 3 |
| Volleyball (4x4 beach volleyball) | FIVB | 2 |
| Water polo (Water polo) | WA | — |
| Waterskiing (Wakeboarding) | IWWF | 2 |
| Waterskiing (Waterski jumping) | IWWF | 2 |
| Wrestling (Beach wrestling) | UWW | 8 |
| Total events | | 36 |

== See also ==
- African Beach Games
- Asian Beach Games
- Mediterranean Beach Games
- South American Beach Games
- World Games
