= Aquathlon at the 2019 World Beach Games =

World Beach Games competitions

- Venue: Katara Beach
- Dates: 14–15 October
- Competitors: 58

Aquathlon competitions at the 2019 World Beach Games in Doha, Qatar were held from 14 to 15 October 2019.

== Format ==
The World Beach Games aquathlon contained three components in each individual event; a 5 km (3.1 mi) run, 2 km (1.2 mi) swim, and a 2 km (1.2 mi) run, and three components each athlete in mixed team event; a 1.25 km (0.78 mi) run, 0.5 km (0.31 mi) swim, and a 1.25 km (0.78 mi) run.

== Qualification ==
The qualification period ends on 3 October 2019. A total of 60 athletes (30 for each gender) vied for the coveted spots with a maximum of two sent to compete for the first twenty-four ITU Aquathlon Rankings ranked athletes, while the other NOCs might have one athlete per event.

24 quotas per gender will be decided based on ITU Aquathlon Ranking List in June 2019. Host nation Qatar will be ensured two quota places each gender. The remaining 4 quotas will be eligible for Invitation Places.

== Medal summary ==
=== Medal table ===
Rank	Nation	Gold	Silver	Bronze	Total
1	Spain	3	0	0	3
2	Azerbaijan	0	2	1	3
3	Hungary	0	1	1	2
4	Romania	0	0	1	1
Totals (4 entries)		3	3	3	9

=== Medalists ===
Event	Gold	Silver	Bronze
Men's individual	Kevin Viñuela; Spain	Márk Dévay; Hungary	Rostyslav Pevtsov; Azerbaijan
Women's individual	Francisca Tous; Spain	Kseniia Levkovska; Azerbaijan	Antoanela Manac; Romania
Mixed relay	Spain; Francisca Tous; Kevin Viñuela	Azerbaijan; Kseniia Levkovska; Rostyslav Pevtsov	Hungary; Márta Kropkó; Márk Dévay

== Participating nations ==
- Azerbaijan (2)
- Belgium (1)
- Cambodia (1)
- Chinese Taipei (2)
- Colombia (4)
- Croatia (1)
- Czech Republic (1)
- Denmark (2)
- Ecuador (1)
- Great Britain (2)
- Hungary (3)
- Japan (1)
- Kazakhstan (1)
- Luxembourg (2)
- Mexico (3)
- Netherlands (2)
- Peru (4)
- Philippines (1)
- Poland (2)
- Portugal (1)
- Qatar (2)
- Romania (2)
- Russia (2)
- Serbia (1)
- Slovakia (1)
- Slovenia (2)
- Spain (2)
- Sweden (1)
- Ukraine (4)
- United States (1)
- Venezuela (3)
