= Bouldering at the 2019 World Beach Games =

- Venue: Aspire Zone
- Dates: 13–14 October
- Competitors: 38 from 19 nations

Bouldering competitions at the 2019 World Beach Games in Doha, Qatar was held from 13 to 14 October 2019. Nineteen athletes competed in each of the men's and women's events.

== Qualification ==
A total of 40 athletes (20 for each gender) vied for the coveted spots with a maximum of two sent to compete for the international quota qualifiers, while the other NOCs might have one athlete per event. Host nation Qatar will be ensured one quota place each gender. The remaining five quotas will be eligible for each continental champions.

=== Qualification summary ===
==== Men's qualification ====
Mean of qualification	Date	Host	Vacancies	Qualified
2018 World Championship	11–14 September 2018	(Austria) Innsbruck	8	Kai Harada (JPN) Gregor Vezonik (SLO) Keita Watabe (JPN) Nathan Phillips (GBR) Jernej Kruder (SLO) Mickaël Mawem (FRA) Florian Klingler (AUT) Nimrod Marcus (ISR)
2019 World Cup	5 April–8 June 2019	Various	6	Gregor Vezonik (SLO) Sean McColl (CAN) Alex Khazanov (ISR) Vadim Timonov (RUS) Sergei Skorodumov (RUS) Samuel McQueen (USA)
2019 Pan American Championship	TBD 2019	TBD	1	
2019 Asian Championship	TBD 2019	TBD	1	
2019 European Championship	5–7 September 2019	(Poland) Zakopane	1	William Ridal (GBR)
2019 Oceanian Championship	TBD 2019	TBD	1	
Total			20	

==== Women's qualification ====
Mean of qualification	Date	Host	Vacancies	Qualified
Host nation	30 October 2015	(United States) Washington, D.C.	1	
2018 World Championship	11–14 September 2018	(Austria) Innsbruck	8	Janja Garnbret (SLO)
2018 World Championship	11–14 September 2018	(Austria) Innsbruck	8	Akiyo Noguchi (JPN)
2018 World Championship	11–14 September 2018	(Austria) Innsbruck	8	Staša Gejo (SRB)
2018 World Championship	11–14 September 2018	(Austria) Innsbruck	8	Jessica Pilz (AUT)
2018 World Championship	11–14 September 2018	(Austria) Innsbruck	8	Miho Nonaka (JPN)
2018 World Championship	11–14 September 2018	(Austria) Innsbruck	8	Petra Klingler (SUI)
2018 World Championship	11–14 September 2018	(Austria) Innsbruck	8	Berit Schwaiger (AUT)
2018 World Championship	11–14 September 2018	(Austria) Innsbruck	8	Sol Sa (KOR)
2019 Pan American Championship	TBD 2019	TBD	1	
2019 Asian Championship	TBD 2019	TBD	1	
2019 European Championship	TBD 2019	TBD	1	
2019 Oceanian Championship	TBD 2019	TBD	1	
2019 South African National Championship	TBD 2019	TBD	1	
Total			8	

== Medal summary ==
=== Medal table ===
Rank	Nation	Gold	Silver	Bronze	Total
1	Japan	2	1	0	3
2	Switzerland	0	1	0	1
3	Germany	0	0	1	1
3	Slovenia	0	0	1	1
Totals (4 entries)		2	2	2	6

=== Medalists ===
Event	Gold	Silver	Bronze
Men's individual	Kai Harada (JPN)	Keita Watabe (JPN)	Philipp Martin (GER)
Women's individual	Miho Nonaka (JPN)	Petra Klingler (SUI)	Urška Repušič (SLO)

== Participating nations ==
- Argentina (1)
- Australia (2)
- Austria (2)
- Canada (4)
- Chile (1)
- Chinese Taipei (1)
- France (3)
- Germany (3)
- Great Britain (3)
- Iran (2)
- Italy (1)
- Israel (1)
- Japan (3)
- Netherlands (1)
- Russia (3)
- Slovenia (3)
- Switzerland (1)
- Ukraine (2)
- United States (1)
