= Karate at the 2019 World Beach Games =

Karate competition

Karate kata at the 2019 World Beach Games
- Venue: Katara Beach
- Dates: 10–11 October
- Competitors: 64

Karate kata competitions at the 2019 World Beach Games in Doha, Qatar were held on October 10 and October 11. The venue for the competition was at Mission Beach. Thirty-two athletes competed in each of the men's and women's events.

== Qualification ==
A total of 64 athletes (32 of each gender) vie for the coveted spots with a maximum of two sent to compete for the best six world championship qualifiers. While the other NOCs might have one athlete per event, host nation Qatar will be ensured one quota place for each gender. The remaining 4 quotas will be eligible for each continental champions. The other remaining 6 quotas will be eligible for best five WKF ranking and one invitation place respectively.

=== Qualification summary ===
==== Men's qualification ====
Mean of qualification	Date	Host	Vacancies	Qualified
Host nation	14 June 2019	(Switzerland) Lausanne	1	Adam Hasham (QAT)
2018 Asian Championships	13–15 July 2018	(Jordan) Amman	4	Ryo Kiyuna (JPN) Wang Yi-ta (TPE) Salman Al-Mosawi (KUW) Chris Cheng (HKG)
2018 African Championships	31 August–2 September 2018	(Rwanda) Kigali	~~4~~	Ofentse Bakwadi (BOT) Adnane El Hakimi (MAR) Ahmed Shawky (EGY)
2018 World Championships	6–10 November 2018	(Spain) Madrid	~~6~~ 3	Ilja Smorguner (GER) Enzo Montarello (FRA) David Contreras (COL)
2019 Pan American Championships	18–23 March 2019	Panama	4	Ariel Torres Gutierrez (USA) Antonio Díaz (VEN) Nykolai Arango (DOM) Héctor Cención (PAN)
2019 European Championships	28–31 March 2019	(Spain) Guadalajara	~~4~~ 3	Damián Quintero (ESP) Ali Sofuoğlu (TUR) Roman Heydarov (AZE)
2019 Oceanian Championships	11–12 April 2019	(Australia) Sydney	~~4~~ 1	Shaun Yuen (AUS)
WKF World Ranking	1 June 2019	(Spain) Madrid	~~5~~ 15	Emre Vefa Göktaş (TUR) Adnan El Hakim (MAR) Ahmad Zigi Zaresta Yuda (INA) Sergio Galán (ESP) Abolfazl Shahrjerdi (IRI) Park Hee-jun (KOR) Botond Nagy (HUN) Madi Kateshov (KAZ) Peter Fabian (SVK) Isaac Hoshi (NZL) Gakuji Tozaki (USA) David Contreras (COL) Lim Chee Wei (MAS) Mohammed Al-Mosawi (KUW) Tomislav Stolar (CRO)
Total			32	

==== Women's qualification ====
Mean of qualification	Date	Host	Vacancies	Qualified
Host nation	14 June 2019	(Switzerland) Lausanne	1	Mona Saud Al-Kharfi (QAT)
2018 Asian Championships	13–15 July 2018	(Jordan) Amman	4	Kiyou Shimizu (JPN) Celine Lee (MAS) Nawar Kautsar Mastura (INA) Grace Lau (HKG)
2018 African Championships	31 August–2 September 2018	(Rwanda) Kigali	4	Sara Sayed (EGY) Sanae Agalmam (MAR) Akele Akele (CMR) Entle Maungwa (BOT)
2018 World Championships	6–10 November 2018	(Spain) Madrid	~~6~~ 3	Ngo Ha Thi (CAN) Ema Brázdová (SVK) Fatemeh Sadeghi (IRI)
2019 Pan American Championships	18–23 March 2019	Panama	4	María Dimitrova (DOM) Sakura Kokumai (USA) Jessica Kwong (USA) Andrea Armada Ruiz (VEN)
2019 European Championships	28–31 March 2019	(Spain) Guadalajara	~~4~~ 3	Sandra Sánchez (ESP) Alexandra Feracci (FRA) Dilara Eltemur (TUR)
2019 Oceanian Championships	11–12 April 2019	(Australia) Sydney	~~4~~ 3	Alexandrea Anacan (NZL) Ioanna Maria Sampani (AUS) Holly Wigg (NZL)
WKF World Ranking	1 June 2019	(Spain) Madrid	~~5~~ 12	Jasmin Jüttner (GER) Veronika Mišková (CZE) Carola Casale (ITA) Nguyễn Thị Phương (VIE) Terryana D'Onofrio (ITA) Raquel Roy Rubio (ESP) Chien Hui-hsuan (TPE) Laura Sterck (HUN) Patricia Esparteiro (POR) Tung Yee Yin (HKG) Biserka Radulović (MNE) Monsicha Tararattanakul (THA)
Total			33	

== Medal summary ==
=== Medal table ===
* Host nation (Qatar)

Rank	Nation	Gold	Silver	Bronze	Total
1	Spain	2	0	0	2
2	Chinese Taipei	0	1	0	1
2	Iran	0	1	0	1
4	Dominican Republic	0	0	1	1
4	Hong Kong	0	0	1	1
4	United States	0	0	1	1
4	Venezuela	0	0	1	1
Totals (7 entries)		2	2	4	8

=== Medalists ===
Event	Gold	Silver	Bronze
Men's individual	Damián Quintero; Spain	Wang Yi-ta; Chinese Taipei	Gakuji Tozaki; United States
Men's individual	Damián Quintero; Spain	Wang Yi-ta; Chinese Taipei	Antonio Díaz; Venezuela
Women's individual	Sandra Sánchez; Spain	Fatemeh Sadeghi; Iran	María Dimitrova; Dominican Republic
Women's individual	Sandra Sánchez; Spain	Fatemeh Sadeghi; Iran	Grace Lau; Hong Kong

== Participating nations ==
- Australia (2)
- Azerbaijan (1)
- Botswana (2)
- Cameroon (1)
- Chinese Taipei (2)
- Colombia (1)
- Croatia (1)
- Czech Republic (1)
- Dominican Republic (2)
- France (3)
- Germany (2)
- Hong Kong (3)
- Hungary (2)
- Indonesia (2)
- Iran (2)
- Italy (2)
- Kazakhstan (1)
- Kuwait (2)
- Malaysia (2)
- Montenegro (1)
- Morocco (3)
- New Zealand (3)
- Panama (1)
- Portugal (1)
- Qatar (2)
- Slovakia (2)
- South Korea (1)
- Spain (4)
- Thailand (1)
- Turkey (3)
- United States (4)
- Venezuela (3)
- Vietnam (1)
