= Open water swimming at the 2019 World Beach Games =

- Dates: 13 October
- Competitors: 52 from 26 nations

Open water swimming competitions at the 2019 World Beach Games in Doha, Qatar were held on 13 October.

== Medal summary ==
=== Medal table ===
Rank	Nation	Gold	Silver	Bronze	Total
1	Brazil	1	0	0	1
1	Italy	1	0	0	1
3	China	0	1	0	1
3	Russia	0	1	0	1
5	Germany	0	0	2	2
Totals (5 entries)		2	2	2	6

=== Medalists ===
Event	Gold	Silver	Bronze
Men's 5 kilometre	Marcello Guidi; Italy	Denis Adeev; Russia	Sören Meißner; Germany
Women's 5 kilometre	Ana Marcela Cunha; Brazil	Hou Yawen; China	Leonie Beck; Germany

== Participating nations ==
- Argentina (1)
- Australia (2)
- Austria (1)
- Brazil (3)
- China (3)
- Czech Republic (3)
- Ecuador (3)
- Germany (4)
- Hungary (4)
- Hong Kong (2)
- Israel (1)
- Italy (2)
- Kazakhstan (1)
- Mexico (2)
- Morocco (1)
- Oman (1)
- Peru (1)
- Poland (1)
- Portugal (2)
- Qatar (2)
- Russia (4)
- Serbia (1)
- Slovakia (1)
- Spain (3)
- Ukraine (1)
- Venezuela (2)
