= Beach soccer at the 2019 World Beach Games =

Event details
- Games: 2019 World Beach Games
- Host country: Qatar
- Dates: 11–16 October
- Venue: 1 (in 1 host city)
- Competitors: 272 from 19 nations

Men's tournament
- Teams: 16 (from 6 confederations)
Medalists
Gold	Brazil
Silver	Russia
Bronze	Iran

Women's tournament
- Teams: 8 (from 4 confederations)
Medalists
Gold	Spain
Silver	Great Britain
Bronze	Brazil

Editions
- ~~2023~~; 2027 →

The beach soccer tournaments at the 2019 World Beach Games, the inaugural edition of the Games, were held from 11 to 16 October 2019 in Doha, Qatar and organised by the Association of National Olympic Committees (ANOC). The matches were hosted on the Katara Beach at two venues which comprised the Beach Soccer Arena.

Two events took place: the men's tournament and the women's tournament. A total of 24 teams participated (16 in the men's competition and eight in the women's). The men's squads could consist of up to 12 players and the women's squads, 10 players, meaning a total of 272 athletes were expected to take part.

Brazil claimed the men's title whilst Spain were the winners of the women's category.

== Competition schedule ==
The tournament began one day before the opening ceremony with medal-deciding matches taking place exclusively on 16 October.

G	Group stage	SF	Semi-finals	B	Bronze medal match	F	Final / Gold medal match

Date Event	Fri 11	Sat 12	Sun 13	Mon 14	Tue 15	Wed 16	
Men	G		G	G	SF	B	F
Women	G		G	G	SF	B	F

== Qualification ==
Each National Olympic Committee (NOC) was allowed to enter one men's team and one women's team into the competition. In order to play at the Games, these teams needed to qualify.

The six continental confederations of FIFA were each allocated a certain amount of berths at the Games; qualification events were organised for teams to compete against other members of their own confederation to try and earn one of their continent's spots at the Games. ANOC delegated the responsibility of organising qualification to Beach Soccer Worldwide (BSWW). Originally, qualification tournaments were planned for all confederations, however, for some, these qualification events were ultimately not realised – instead, their teams which occupied the highest positions in the BSWW World Ranking were granted qualification.

The host country qualifies automatically. When San Diego relinquished the hosting rights to Doha, the United States was stripped of its entitlement to automatic qualification for its men's and women's teams. New hosts, Qatar, declined to enter any teams, leaving the berths reserved for the host nations unfilled; consequently, these vacant berths were redistributed accordingly.

=== Men's qualification ===
Means of qualification	Ref.	Dates	Venue	Berths	Qualified
2019 UEFA Qualifying Tournament		9–12 May 2019	(Spain) Salou	5	Italy; Russia; Spain; Switzerland; Ukraine
2019 African Beach Games		19–23 June 2019	(Cape Verde) Sal	2	Morocco; Senegal
BSWW World Ranking (Top ranked AFC teams)		10 July 2019 (Note: The dates of teams who qualified via their world ranking or invitation refer to when they were publicly revealed by the qualification organisers.)	–	3	Iran; Japan; United Arab Emirates
BSWW World Ranking (Top ranked OFC team)		10 July 2019	–	1	Solomon Islands^{[a]}
2019 CONCACAF Qualifying Tournament		3–5 August 2019	(El Salvador) San Salvador	2	El Salvador; Mexico
BSWW World Ranking (Top ranked CONMEBOL teams)		23 August 2019	–	3	Brazil; Paraguay; Uruguay
Total				16	

a. Tahiti are the highest ranked team from the OFC. However, they are ineligible to enter since French Polynesia is not a member of ANOC. Therefore, the berth has been given to the OFC's next highest ranked team that is a member.

=== Women's qualification ===
Means of qualification	Ref.	Dates	Venue	Berths^{[b]}	Qualified
2019 UEFA Qualifying Tournament		9–12 May 2019	(Spain) Salou	3	Great Britain^{[c]} Russia; Spain
2019 African Beach Games		19–23 June 2019	(Cape Verde) Sal	1	Cape Verde
2019 CONCACAF Qualifying Tournament		3–5 August 2019	(El Salvador) San Salvador	2	Mexico; United States
Invitation (CONMEBOL teams)		23 August 2019	–	2	Brazil; Paraguay
Total				8	

b. With the exception of UEFA, all confederations were originally allocated one berth each. However, neither the Asian Football Confederation (AFC) nor Oceania Football Confederation (OFC) ultimately entered any teams (China were due to enter a team as the AFC representative but withdrew). Therefore, these two vacant berths were redistributed, with CONMEBOL and CONCACAF each receiving one extra berth.
c. Competed in qualification as England. England does not have an independent NOC and is instead represented by Great Britain at Olympic events.

== Participating NOCs ==
A total of 19 National Olympic Committees (NOCs), as per the outcome of qualification events, participated (the number of participating athletes of each NOC are shown in parentheses).

- Brazil (22)
- Cape Verde (10)
- El Salvador (12)
- Great Britain (10)
- Iran (12)
- Italy (12)
- Japan (12)
- Morocco (12)
- Mexico (22)
- Paraguay (22)
- Russia (22)
- Senegal (12)
- Solomon Islands (12)
- Spain (22)
- Switzerland (12)
- United Arab Emirates (12)
- Ukraine (12)
- United States (10)
- Uruguay (12)

== Medal summary ==
=== Medal table ===
Rank	Nation	Gold	Silver	Bronze	Total
1	Brazil	1	0	1	2
2	Spain	1	0	0	1
3	Great Britain	0	1	0	1
3	Russia	0	1	0	1
5	Iran	0	0	1	1
Totals (5 entries)		2	2	2	6

=== Medalists ===
Event	Gold	Silver	Bronze
Men's tournament	Brazil; Mão; Rafinha; Antônio; Catarino; Filipe Silva; Lucão; Bokinha; Rodrigo Souto; Rodrigo; Datinha; Mauricinho; Rafael Padilha	Russia; Ivan Ostrovskii; Andrey Novikov; Aleksey Makarov; Yuri Krasheninnikov; Dmitry Shishin; Anton Shkarin; Aleksei Pavlenko; Artur Paporotnyi; Kirill Romanov; Pavel Bazhenov; Boris Nikonorov; Fedor Zemskov	Iran; Peyman Hosseini; Amir Akbari; Hassan Abdollahi; Mostafa Kiani; Mehdi Shirmohammadi; Ali Mirshekari; Mohammad Mokhtari; Mohammad Ahmadzadeh; Hamid Behzadpour; Saeid Piramoun; Hadi Farahmand; Mohammad Masoumizadeh
Women's tournament	Spain; Laura Gallego; Andrea Mirón; Carmen Fresneda; Lorena Asensio; Alba Mellado; Sara Gozález; Carolina Gozález; Jessica Higueras; Carla Morera; Laia García	Great Britain; Hannah Haughton; Katie James; Nadine Bazan; Hannah Short; Wendy Martin; Sarah Kempson; Rebecca Barron; Gemma Hillier; Molly Clark; Charlotte Haynes	Brazil; Natalie Wippel; Adriele Rocha; Jasna Nagel; Nayara Couto; Bárbara Colodetti; Noele Bastos; Lorena Medeiros; Letícia Villar; Dani Barboza; Letícia Lopes

== See also ==
- 2019 FIFA Beach Soccer World Cup
- Beach soccer at the 2019 European Games
