= Beach tennis at the 2019 World Beach Games =

World Beach Games competitions

- Venue: Katara Beach
- Dates: 12–16 October
- Competitors: 64 from 15 nations

Beach tennis competitions at the 2019 World Beach Games in Doha, Qatar were held from 12 to 16 October 2019.

== Medal summary ==
=== Medal table ===
Rank	Nation	Gold	Silver	Bronze	Total
1	Brazil	1	2	1	4
2	Italy	1	0	0	1
2	Spain	1	0	0	1
4	France	0	1	0	1
5	Russia	0	0	2	2
Totals (5 entries)		3	3	3	9

=== Medalists ===
Event	Gold	Silver	Bronze
Men's doubles	Spain; Antonio Ramos; Gerard Rodriguez	Brazil; Andre Baran; Vinicius Font	ROC; Nikita Burmakin; Sergey Kuptsov
Women's doubles	Italy; Flaminia Daina; Nicole Nobile	Brazil; Joana Cortez; Rafaella Miller	ROC; Daria Churakova; Irina Glimakova
Mixed doubles	Brazil; Andre Baran; Rafaella Miller	France; Nicolas Gianotti; Marie-Eve Hoarau	Brazil; Vinicius Font; Joana Cortez

== Participating nations ==
- Aruba (2)
- Brazil (8)
- France (8)
- Italy (8)
- Japan (4)
- Latvia (2)
- Morocco (2)
- Portugal (4)
- Puerto Rico (4)
- Qatar (2)
- Russia (8)
- San Marino (2)
- Spain (4)
- United States (4)
- Venezuela (6)

== Men's doubles ==
1/8 finals
1	Alessandro Calbucci (ITA); Michele Cappelletti (ITA)	6	6
Satoshi Goda (JPN); Naoaki Yamamoto (JPN)	3	0
8	Henrique Freitas (POR); Pedro Maio (POR)	1	3
9	Nikolai Gurev (RUS); Ivan Syrov (RUS)	6	6
5	Andre Baran (BRA); Vinicius Font (BRA)	6	6
12	Nikita Ribakovs (LAT); Maksimilians Anderson (LAT)	4	2
4	Carlos Rivera (USA); Mark Bonfigli (USA)	0	3
13	Giullaume Leruste (FRA); Nicolas Gianotti (FRA)	6	6
6	Theo Irigaray (FRA); Mathieu Guegano (FRA)	7	3	[10]
11	Ramon Guedez (VEN); Ali Colmenares (VEN)	5	6	[7]
3	Aksel Samardzic (ARU); Sander Castro (ARU)	6	3
14	Antonio Ramos (ESP); Gerard Rodriguez (ESP)	7	6
7	Vladimir Helmut (PUR); Javier Mendez (PUR)	3	0
10	Marcus Ferreira (BRA); Thales Santos (BRA)	6	6
2	Nikita Burmakin (RUS); Sergey Kuptsov (RUS)	5	6	[10]
15	Tommaso Giovannini (ITA); Luca Cramarossa (ITA)	7	1	8

Quarter-finals
A Calbucci (ITA); M Cappelletti (ITA)	6	7
N Gurev (RUS); I Syrov (RUS)	1	5
A Baran (BRA); V Font (BRA)	6	6
G Leruste (FRA); N Gianotti (FRA)	4	4
T Irigaray (FRA); M Guegano (FRA)	5	3
A Ramos (ESP); G Rodriguez (ESP)	7	6
M Ferreira (BRA); T Santos (BRA)	3	3
N Burmakin (RUS); S Kuptsov (RUS)	6	6

Semi-finals
A Calbucci (ITA); M Cappelletti (ITA)	6	2	[7]
A Baran (BRA); V Font (BRA)	4	6	[10]
A Ramos (ESP); G Rodriguez (ESP)	6	6
N Burmakin (RUS); S Kuptsov (RUS)	3	3

Final
A Baran (BRA); V Font (BRA)	6	5
A Ramos (ESP); G Rodriguez (ESP)	7	7
Bronze medal
A Calbucci (ITA); M Cappelletti (ITA)	1	4
N Burmakin (RUS); S Kuptsov (RUS)	6	6

== Women's doubles ==
1/8 finals
1	Giulia Gasparri (ITA); Sofia Cimatti (ITA)	6	7
16	Beatriz Rivera (PUR); Claudia Lopez (PUR)	2	5
8	Liudmila Nikoyan (RUS); Ekaterina Kirgizova (RUS)	6	6
9	Sarah Benabdeljalil (MAR); Camila Benabdeljalil (MAR)	2	4
5	Joana Cortez (BRA); Rafaella Miller (BRA)	6	6
12	Mathilde Hoarau (FRA); Marie-Eve Hoarau (FRA)	3	1
4	Lady Correa (VEN); Patricia Diaz (VEN)	4	7	[10]
13	Erina Otsuka (JPN); Aoi Shibayama (JPN)	6	6	7
6	Nadia Johnston (USA); Nicole Melch (USA)	6	6
11	Valentina Persad (VEN); Iosune Roncal (VEN)	3	4
3	Sabrina Lopez (ESP); Eva Fernandez (ESP)	4	0
14	Daria Churakova (RUS); Irina Glimakova (RUS)	6	6
7	Magali Garnier (FRA); Julie Labrit (FRA)	4	4
10	Lorena Melo (BRA); Marcela Vita (BRA)	6	6
2	Alice Grandi (SMR); Marika Colonna (SMR)	1	1
15	Flaminia Daina (ITA); Nicole Nobile (ITA)	6	6

Quarter-finals
G Gasparri (ITA); S Cimatti (ITA)	6	6
L Nikoyan (RUS); E Kirgizova (RUS)	2	2
J Cortez (BRA); R Miller (BRA)	6	6
L Correa (VEN); P Diaz (VEN)	4	2
N Johnston (USA); N Melch (USA)	7	6	[5]
D Churakova (RUS); I Glimakova (RUS)	6	7	[10]
L Melo (BRA); M Vita (BRA)	3	3
F Daina (ITA); N Nobile (ITA)	6	6

Semi-finals
G Gasparri (ITA); S Cimatti (ITA)	2	3
J Cortez (BRA); R Miller (BRA)	6	6
D Churakova (RUS); I Glimakova (RUS)	5	7	[3]
F Daina (ITA); N Nobile (ITA)	7	5	[10]

Final
J Cortez (BRA); R Miller (BRA)	7	6	[11]
F Daina (ITA); N Nobile (ITA)	6	7	[13]
Bronze medal
G Gasparri (ITA); S Cimatti (ITA)	6	1	[7]
D Churakova (RUS); I Glimakova (RUS)	4	6	[11]

=== Preliminary ===
Preliminary
1	Manuela Cunha (POR); Catarina Alexandrino (POR)	6	4
2	Valentina Persad (VEN); Iosune Roncal (VEN)	7	6

== Mixed doubles ==
=== Finals ===
Finals
1	N Gianotti (FRA); M-E Hoarau (FRA)	1	1
2	A Baran (BRA); R Miller (BRA)	6	6

=== Top half ===
Round of 32
8	Carlos Rivera (USA); Nicole Melch (USA)	2	6
9	Nikolai Gurev (RUS); Liudmila Nikoyan (RUS)	6	7
3	Henrique Freitas (POR); Manuela Cunha (POR)	7	3	[5]
14	Javier Mendez (PUR); Beatriz Rivera (PUR)	6	6	[10]
7	Naoaki Yamamoto (JPN); Erina Otsuka (JPN)	6	6
10	Sultan Al-Alawi (QAT); Mubaraka Al-Naimi (QAT)	0	1

1/8 finals
Michele Cappelletti (ITA); Sofia Cimatti (ITA)	2	6
N Gurev (RUS); L Nikoyan (RUS)	6	7
Nicolas Gianotti (FRA); Marie-Eve Hoarau (FRA)	5	6	[10]
Ramon Guedez (VEN); Patricia Diaz (VEN)	7	1	[8]
Vinicius Font (BRA); Joana Cortez (BRA)	5	7	[10]
J Mendez (PUR); B Rivera (PUR)	7	6	6
N Yamamoto (JPN); E Otsuka (JPN)	4	2
Gerard Rodriguez (ESP); Sabrina Lopez (ESP)	6	6

Quarter-finals
N Gurev (RUS); L Nikoyan (RUS)	6	6	[13]
N Gianotti (FRA); M-E Hoarau (FRA)	3	7	[15]
V Font (BRA); J Cortez (BRA)	6	6
G Rodriguez (ESP); S Lopez (ESP)	4	1

Semifinals
N Gianotti (FRA); M-E Hoarau (FRA)	7	2	[10]
V Font (BRA); J Cortez (BRA)	6	6	[7]

=== Bottom half ===
Round of 32
5	Mark Bonfigli (USA); Nadia Johnston (USA)	1	4
12	Mathieu Guegano (FRA); Mathilde Hoarau (FRA)	6	6
7	Pedro Maio (POR); Catarina Alexandrino (POR)	1	4
10	Satoshi Goda (JPN); Aoi Shibayama (JPN)	6	6

1/8 finals
Antonio Ramos (ESP); Eva Fernandez (ESP)	6	6
Ali Colmenares (VEN); Lady Correa (VEN)	2	4
M Guegano (FRA); M Hoarau (FRA)	2	5
Andre Baran (BRA); Rafaella Miller (BRA)	6	7
Nikita Burmakin (RUS); Irina Glimakova (RUS)	6	6
Vladimir Helmut (PUR); Claudia Lopez (PUR)	1	2
N Yamamoto (JPN); E Otsuka (JPN)	2	0
Giovannini Tommaso (ITA); Flaminia Daina (ITA)	6	6

Quarter-finals
A Ramos (ESP); E Fernandez (ESP)	6	3	[3]
A Baran (BRA); R Miller (BRA)	4	6	[10]
N Burmakin (RUS); I Glimakova (RUS)	6	5
G Tommaso (ITA); F Daina (ITA)	7	7

Semifinals
A Baran (BRA); R Miller (BRA)	6	7
G Tommaso (ITA); F Daina (ITA)	4	6
