= 3x3 basketball at the 2019 World Beach Games =

- Venue: Katara Beach
- Location: Doha, Qatar
- Date: 10–13 October
- Nations: 21
- Teams: 32 (16 men's, 16 women's)

Medalists
gold medal	Russia (men)
gold medal	France (women)
silver medal	Brazil (men)
silver medal	Netherlands (women)
bronze medal	Mongolia (men)
bronze medal	China (women)

3x3 basketball competitions at the 2019 World Beach Games in Doha, Qatar were scheduled to be held from October 10 to October 13. The venue for the competition was located at Mission Beach. A total of sixteen men's and sixteen women's teams (each consisting up to 4 athletes) competed in each tournament. This means a total of 128 athletes were scheduled to compete.

== Qualification ==
Each National Olympic Committee was able to enter up to one men's and one women's team in the 3x3 basketball tournaments. The qualification processes for the men's and women's events were similar. The host country was guaranteed an entry in each event. Top four per gender from Africa, Europe and Asia-Pacific) on 1 November 2018 should obtain one quota place for that gender. The region to which the host country belongs (Americas) got only three (3) quota places per gender for their NOC in addition to the host country.

=== Men's qualification ===
Mean of qualification	Date	Host	Vacancies	Qualified
Host nation	14 June 2019	(Switzerland) Lausanne	1	Qatar
U23 World Ranking for African Team	1 November 2018	(Switzerland) Mies	4	Egypt Uganda Ivory Coast Togo
U23 World Ranking for American Team	1 November 2018	(Switzerland) Mies	3	Brazil Argentina Dominican Republic Venezuela
U23 World Ranking for Asian Team	1 November 2018	(Switzerland) Mies	3	China Mongolia Qatar Jordan
U23 World Ranking for European Team	1 November 2018	(Switzerland) Mies	4	Russia Latvia Ukraine Slovenia
Total			16	

=== Women's qualification ===
Mean of qualification	Date	Host	Vacancies	Qualified
Host nation	30 October 2015	(United States) Washington, D.C.	1	United States
U23 World Ranking for African Team	1 November 2018	(Switzerland) Mies	4	Uganda
U23 World Ranking for African Team	1 November 2018	(Switzerland) Mies	4	Egypt
U23 World Ranking for African Team	1 November 2018	(Switzerland) Mies	4	Mali
U23 World Ranking for African Team	1 November 2018	(Switzerland) Mies	4	Togo
U23 World Ranking for American Team	1 November 2018	(Switzerland) Mies	3	Brazil
U23 World Ranking for American Team	1 November 2018	(Switzerland) Mies	3	Argentina
U23 World Ranking for American Team	1 November 2018	(Switzerland) Mies	3	Dominican Republic
U23 World Ranking for Asian Team	1 November 2018	(Switzerland) Mies	4	China
U23 World Ranking for Asian Team	1 November 2018	(Switzerland) Mies	4	Mongolia
U23 World Ranking for Asian Team	1 November 2018	(Switzerland) Mies	4	Indonesia
U23 World Ranking for Asian Team	1 November 2018	(Switzerland) Mies	4	Iran
U23 World Ranking for European Team	1 November 2018	(Switzerland) Mies	4	Ukraine
U23 World Ranking for European Team	1 November 2018	(Switzerland) Mies	4	France
U23 World Ranking for European Team	1 November 2018	(Switzerland) Mies	4	Russia
U23 World Ranking for European Team	1 November 2018	(Switzerland) Mies	4	Netherlands
Total			16	

== Medal summary ==
=== Medal table ===
* Host nation (Qatar)

Rank	Nation	Gold	Silver	Bronze	Total
1	France	1	0	0	1
1	Russia	1	0	0	1
3	Brazil	0	1	0	1
3	Netherlands	0	1	0	1
5	China	0	0	1	1
5	Mongolia	0	0	1	1
Totals (6 entries)		2	2	2	6

=== Medalists ===
Event	Gold	Silver	Bronze
Men	Russia; Daniil Abramovskii; Vasilii Berdnikov; Dmitrii Cheburkin; Ivan Khramov	Brazil; Matheus Bispo; Leonardo Branquinho; Fabrício Veríssimo; William Weihermann	Mongolia; Ariunboldyn Anand; Batsaikhany Altangerel; Chuluunbaataryn Ikhbayar; Gantsolmongiin Gan-Erdene
Women	France; Maëva Djaldi-Tabdi; Marie-Paule Foppossi; Diaba Konate; Johanna Muzet	Netherlands; Myrthe den Heeten; Esther Fokke; Fleur Kuijt; Charlotte van Kleef	China; Ha Wenxi; Pan Xuemei; Wang Haimei; Zhang Lingge

== Participating nations ==
A total of 128 athletes from 21 nations were scheduled to participate (the numbers of athletes are shown in parentheses).

- Argentina (8)
- Brazil (8)
- China (8)
- Dominican Republic (8)
- Egypt (8)
- France (4)
- Indonesia (4)
- Iran (4)
- Ivory Coast (4)
- Jordan (4)
- Latvia (4)
- Mali (4)
- Mongolia (8)
- Netherlands (4)
- Qatar (4)
- Russia (8)
- Slovenia (4)
- Togo (8)
- Uganda (8)
- Ukraine (8)
- United States (8)
