= Beach volleyball at the World Beach Games =

Sports event

The 4x4 Beach volleyball World Games Tournament was first contested in the 1st World Beach Games Event in Qatar, Doha for both men and women.

== Men's tournament ==
=== History ===
| Year | Location | Gold | Silver | Bronze |
|---|---|---|---|---|
| 2019; Details | Doha, Qatar | United States 4x4 | Qatar 4x4 | Indonesia 4x4 |
| 2021; Details | Cancelled | | | |
| 2027; Details | Da Nang, Vietnam | | | |

== Men, medals summary ==
| Rank | Nation | Gold | Silver | Bronze | Total |
|---|---|---|---|---|---|
| 1 | United States (USA) | 1 | 0 | 0 | 1 |
| 2 | Qatar (QAT) | 0 | 1 | 0 | 1 |
| 3 | Indonesia (INA) | 0 | 0 | 1 | 1 |
| Totals (3 entries) | | 1 | 1 | 1 | 3 |

== Women's tournament ==
=== History ===
| Year | Location | Gold | Silver | Bronze |
|---|---|---|---|---|
| 2019; Details | Doha, Qatar | United States 4x4 | Brazil 4x4 | Canada 4x4 |
| 2021; Details | TBD | | | |
| 2027; Details | Da Nang, Vietnam | | | |

== Women, medals summary ==
| Rank | Nation | Gold | Silver | Bronze | Total |
|---|---|---|---|---|---|
| 1 | United States (USA) | 1 | 0 | 0 | 1 |
| 2 | Brazil (BRA) | 0 | 1 | 0 | 1 |
| 3 | Canada (CAN) | 0 | 0 | 1 | 1 |
| Totals (3 entries) | | 1 | 1 | 1 | 3 |
