= Kamila Barbosa =

Brazilian freestyle wrestler

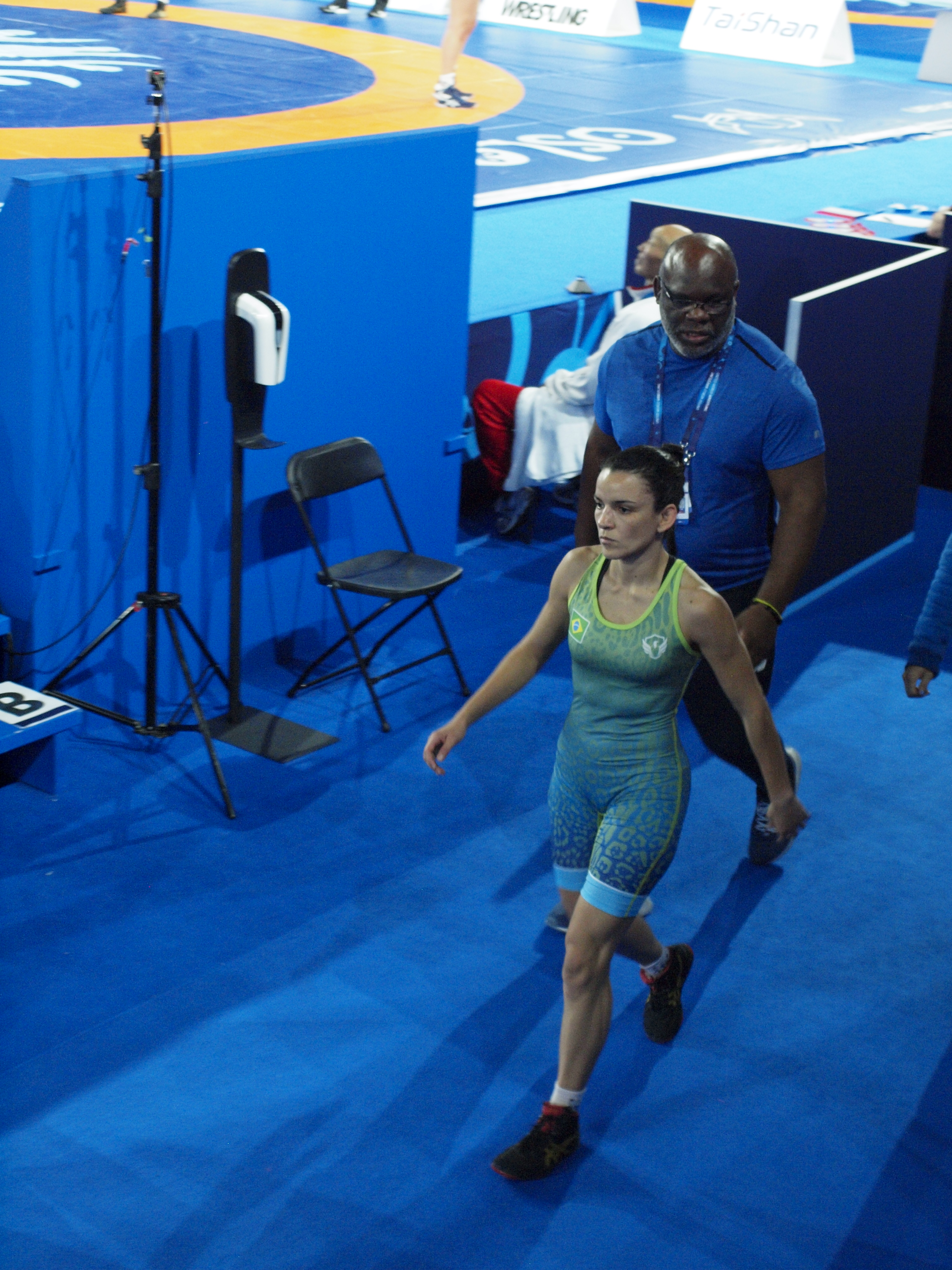
- Kamila Barbosa at the 2021 World Wrestling Championships in Oslo, Norway

Personal information
- Full name: Kamila Barbosa Vito da Silva
- Born: 13 September 1988 (age 37) Goianésia, Goiás

Sport
- Country: Brazil
- Sport: Amateur wrestling
- Weight class: 50 kg
- Event: Freestyle
Medal record
Representing Brazil
Women's freestyle wrestling
Pan American Championships
Bronze medal – third place	2020 Ottawa	50 kg
Bronze medal – third place	2021 Guatemala City	50 kg
Women's beach wrestling
World Beach Games
Gold medal – first place	2019 Doha	50 kg

Kamila Barbosa Vito da Silva (born 13 September 1988) is a Brazilian freestyle wrestler. She is a two-time bronze medalist at the Pan American Wrestling Championships. She also represented Brazil at the Pan American Games in 2015 and in 2019.

== Career ==
Barbosa competed in the women's 48 kg event at the 2015 Pan American Games held in Toronto, Canada. She was eliminated in her first match by Yusneylys Guzmán of Cuba. A few months later, she competed in her event at the 2015 World Wrestling Championships held in Las Vegas, United States.

In 2019, Barbosa competed at the Pan American Wrestling Championships in Buenos Aires, Argentina and the World Wrestling Championships in Nur-Sultan, Kazakhstan. She also represented Brazil at the World Beach Games in Doha, Qatar and she won the gold medal in the women's 50 kg beach wrestling event.

At the 2020 Pan American Wrestling Championships held in Ottawa, Canada, she won one of the bronze medals in the 50 kg event. She also competed in the 2020 Pan American Wrestling Olympic Qualification Tournament, also held in Ottawa, Canada, without qualifying for the 2020 Summer Olympics in Tokyo, Japan. She also failed to qualify for the Olympics at the World Olympic Qualification Tournament held in Sofia, Bulgaria.

In 2021, Barbosa won one of the bronze medals in the women's 50 kg event at the Pan American Wrestling Championships held in Guatemala City, Guatemala. In October 2021, she was eliminated in her first match in the women's 50 kg event at the World Wrestling Championships held in Oslo, Norway.

In 2022, Barbosa competed in the 50 kg event at the Yasar Dogu Tournament held in Istanbul, Turkey. She competed in the 50 kg event at the 2022 World Wrestling Championships held in Belgrade, Serbia. Barbosa also competed in the 50 kg event at the 2023 World Wrestling Championships held in Belgrade, Serbia. She was eliminated in her first match at both the 2022 and 2023 World Wrestling Championships events.

Barbosa competed at the 2024 Pan American Wrestling Olympic Qualification Tournament held in Acapulco, Mexico hoping to qualify for the 2024 Summer Olympics in Paris, France. She was eliminated in her first match. Barbosa also competed at the 2024 World Wrestling Olympic Qualification Tournament held in Istanbul, Turkey without qualifying for the Olympics.

== Achievements ==
Year	Tournament	Location	Result	Event
2019	World Beach Games	Doha, Qatar	1st	Beach wrestling 50 kg
2020	Pan American Championships	Ottawa, Canada	3rd	Freestyle 50 kg
2021	Pan American Championships	Guatemala City, Guatemala	3rd	Freestyle 50 kg
