= Beach handball at the World Beach Games =

The Beach Handball World Games tournaments were first contested in the first World Beach Games event in Qatar, Doha.

== Men's tournament ==
=== History ===
Year	Host	Gold Medal Match			Bronze Medal Match		
Year	Host	Gold	Score	Silver	Bronze	Score	Fourth place
2019; Details	(Qatar); Doha	Brazil	2 – 1	Spain	Sweden	2 – 1	Qatar
2023; Details	(Indonesia); Bali cancelled						
2027; Details	(Vietnam); Da Nang						

== Men's medals summary ==
Rank	Nation	Gold	Silver	Bronze	Total
1	Brazil (BRA)	1	0	0	1
2	Spain (ESP)	0	1	0	1
3	Sweden (SWE)	0	0	1	1
Totals (3 entries)		1	1	1	3

== Women's tournament ==
=== History ===
Year	Host	Gold Medal Match			Bronze Medal Match		
Year	Host	Gold	Score	Silver	Bronze	Score	Fourth place
2019; Details	(Qatar); Doha	Denmark	2 – 0	Hungary	Brazil	2 – 0	Vietnam
2023; Details	(Indonesia); Bali						
2027; Details	(Vietnam); Da Nang						

== Women's medals summary ==
Rank	Nation	Gold	Silver	Bronze	Total
1	Denmark (DEN)	1	0	0	1
2	Hungary (HUN)	0	1	0	1
3	Brazil (BRA)	0	0	1	1
Totals (3 entries)		1	1	1	3
