= 2023 World Beach Games =

Second edition of the World Beach Games

- Host city: Bali
- Country: Indonesia
- Events: 31 in 14 sports (14 disciplines)
- Opening: 5 August 2023 (cancelled)
- Closing: 12 August 2023 (cancelled)

The 2023 World Beach Games (Indonesian: Pesta Olahraga Pantai Dunia 2023), officially known as the 2023 ANOC World Beach Games and colloquially as Bali 2023, would have been the second edition of the World Beach Games, an international beach and water multi-sport event organized by the Association of National Olympic Committees (ANOC). Originally scheduled for 2021, the event was postponed until 2023 due to the effects of the COVID-19 pandemic, and subsequently cancelled less than one month before it was due to start.

Aquathlon, beach handball, kata, beach soccer, beach tennis, beach volleyball, beach water polo, beach wrestling, kite foil and open water swimming were to be the "core sports" of the Games, while another four sports were to have been added to the programme, totalling 14.

Bali, Indonesia was awarded hosting rights on 10 June 2022; the Games were planned to take place from 5 to 12 August 2023.

One month before the start, the ANOC announced that the Games would be cancelled because the Indonesian Olympic Committee (KOI) had withdrawn from its commitment to host 2023 ANOC World Beach Games as the funding had not been released by the Government of Indonesia. There was not enough time to award the games to another host.

== Host selection ==
Following the Games' postponement to 2023, the bidding process began in August 2021, and ended with the announcement of the hosts in June 2022.

Official bids

- Indonesia:

Indonesia officially became the strongest candidate to host the Games, following an announcement made at the General Assembly of the Association of National Olympic Committees (ANOC) in Crete, Greece, which was held on 24–25 October 2021. However, doubts remained as Indonesia's national anti-doping body was subject to a ban by the World Anti-Doping Agency (WADA), preventing it from being awarded hosting rights to any international multisport event. The ban was subsequently lifted by WADA in February 2022. Ultimately, with the ban expired and Indonesia the only official bid put forward, it was unanimously chosen to be hosts in June 2022. The host city contract was signed in October 2022.

Expressed interest

- Hong Kong:

The Hong Kong Olympic Committee considered making a bid to host this edition of the Games as early as 2016 after two failed attempts to bid for the hosting rights of the Asian Games, believing that hosting the beach sports competition to be more financially feasible than the continental games. Sites considered for the venue if Hong Kong was to win the bid included Repulse Bay, Stanley, Southern district, Lantau Island and Big Wave Bay.

- (United States) Los Angeles:

In 2019, California Ultimate considered submission for a bid for this edition of the Games in partnership with the Los Angeles Organization of Ultimate Teams.

== The Games ==
=== Sports ===
The 2023 World Beach Games would have featured 14 disciplines in 14 sports; the programme was finalised in August 2022. All of the events would have been non-Olympic, i.e., not featured in the current programme for the Summer Olympics, and gender equal.

On 5 October 2022, it was announced that kitefoil racing would be replaced by wingfoil racing, owing to a review of weather conditions in Bali making a successful competition of the former unlikely.

After consulting with the executive board of the Association of National Olympic Committees (ANOC), it was decided that 3x3 Basketball would not feature at the games. Bali 2023 faced issues regarding several venues and tried to find solutions to ensure sports programs would remain part of the ANOC World Beach Games Bali 2023. The Local Organizing Committee (LOC), in this case the Indonesia ANOC World Beach Games Organizing Committee, also tried to find an alternative venue for 3x3 basketball because the operator wanted to charge a rental price that was too high for the location that had previously been confirmed to be for the sport. Due to budget and time constraints, ANOC regretfully accepted the LOC's decision and request.

1. Badminton
  - Air badminton (4)
2. Football
  - Beach soccer (2)
3. Handball
  - Beach handball (2)
4. Karate
  - Karate (2)
5. Rowing
  - Beach sprint
6. Sailing
  - Wing foiling (2)
7. Surfing
  - Surfing
8. Swimming
  - Open water swimming (3)
9. Tennis
  - Beach tennis (3)
10. Triathlon
  - Aquathlon (3)
11. Volleyball
  - 4x4 beach volleyball (2)
12. Water polo
  - Beach water polo
13. Wrestling
  - Beach wrestling (8)

Numbers in parentheses indicate the number of medal events contested in each separate discipline.

== Participating National Olympic Committees (NOCs) ==
It was expected a similar number of NOCs, around 100, would participate as in the previous event. After the 2022 Russian invasion of Ukraine, the International Olympic Committee (IOC) recommended all Russian and Belarusian athletes and officials be barred from participating at Olympic-affiliated Games.
