= Switzerland at the 2019 World Beach Games =

- IOC code: SUI
- NOC: Swiss Olympic Association
- Website: www.swissolympic.ch (in German and French)

in Doha 12 October 2019 – 16 October 2019
- Competitors: 15 (13 men and 2 women) in 4 sports
- Medals: Gold 0 Silver 1 Bronze 0 Total 1

World Beach Games appearances
- 2019; 2023

Switzerland competed at the 2019 World Beach Games in Doha, Qatar, from 12 to 16 October 2019. The Swiss team consisted of 15 athletes, 13 men and 2 women, across three sports.

== Medalists ==
Medal	Name	Sport	Event	Date
Silver	Petra Klingler	Bouldering	Women's individual	October 14

== Competitors ==
The following is the list of number of competitors in the Games:

Sport	Men	Women	Total
Beach soccer	12	0	12
Bouldering	0	1	1
Skateboarding	1	0	1
Waterskiing	0	1	1
Total	13	2	15

== Beach soccer ==
Summary

Key:

- FT – After full time.
- P – Match decided by penalty-shootout.

Team	Event	Group Stage						Semifinal	Final / BM	
Team	Event	Opposition Score	Opposition Score	Opposition Score	Opposition Score	Opposition Score	Rank	Opposition Score	Opposition Score	Rank
Switzerland men's	Men's tournament	United Arab Emirates	Morocco	Brazil						

=== Men's tournament ===
Switzerland men's beach soccer team qualified for the Olympics by reaching the fourth place at the 2019 UEFA Qualifying Tournament.

Team roster

The following is the Swiss squad in the men's beach soccer tournament of the 2019 World Beach Games.

Head coach: Angelo Schirinzi

No.	Pos.	Player	Date of birth (age)	Caps	Goals	2019 club
	MF	Philipp Borer	15 June 1990 (aged 29)	38	38	(Swiss Football Association) SC Dornach
	FW	Glenn Hodel	22 November 1996 (aged 22)	58	67	(Colombian Football Federation) ?
	DF	Moritz Jäggy	1 January 1983 (aged 36)	41	7	(Swiss Football Association) SC Binningen
	GK	Valentin Jäggy	19 October 1986 (aged 32)	54	7	(Swiss Football Association) SC Binningen
	GK	Eliott Mounoud	10 August 1995 (aged 24)	4	3	?
	MF	Jan Ostgen	11 June 1996 (aged 23)	36	9	(Swiss Football Association) FC Bünz-Maiengrün
	FW	Noel Ott	15 January 1994 (aged 25)	56	94	(Swiss Football Association) FC Wettingen
	DF	Sandro Spaccarotella	5 August 1982 (aged 37)	56	23	(Swiss Football Association) FC Basel 1893
	GK	Nico Stalder	1 November 1983 (aged 35)	24	0	(Swiss Football Association) FC Brislach
	FW	Dejan Stankovic	25 August 1985 (aged 34)	58	86	(Swiss Football Association) FC Affoltern a/A
	MF	Tobias Steinemann	6 June 1996 (aged 23)	62	34	(Swiss Football Association) AFM Futsal Maniacs
	MF	Angelo Wüest	28 March 1990 (aged 29)	31	12	(Swiss Football Association) SV Schaffhausen

Group play

== Bouldering ==
- Petra Klingler

== Skateboarding ==
- Greg Ruhoff

== Waterskiing ==
- Rea Jörger
