= Nigeria at the 2019 World Beach Games =

- Flag of Nigeria
- IOC code: NGR

in Doha, Qatar 12 October 2019 – 16 October 2019
- Medals Ranked 13th: Gold 1 Silver 0 Bronze 0 Total 1

World Beach Games appearances
- 2019; 2023

Nigeria competed at the inaugural World Beach Games in Doha, Qatar from 12 to 16 October 2019. In total, athletes representing Nigeria originally won one gold medal and one silver medal. In February 2021 however, silver medallist Mercy Genesis was found guilty of doping offences committed at the Games. She was stripped of her medal.

== Medal summary ==
Medals by sport
Sport	1st place, gold medalist(s)	2nd place, silver medalist(s)	3rd place, bronze medalist(s)	Total
Beach wrestling	1	0	0	1

=== Medalists ===
Medal	Name	Sport	Event
Gold	Blessing Onyebuchi	Beach wrestling	Women's +70 kg
~~Silver~~	~~Mercy Genesis~~	~~Beach wrestling~~	~~Women's 50 kg~~
