= Los Angeles Organization of Ultimate Teams =

Largest ultimate frisbee organization in Southern California

The Los Angeles Organization of Ultimate Teams an ultimate frisbee organization in Southern California. It oversees four adult leagues, a pickup program with more than 20 locations, and a youth frisbee program. It has been covered in the Los Angeles Times and mentioned in other media outlets. It is the home of several nationally recognized ultimate teams.

== Adult ==
In addition to winter, spring and summer leagues, the group runs a beach league and organizes the annual LeiOUT Beach Tournament (every January) in Santa Monica, California with over 1,000 adult participants. The tournament draws participants from up and down the west coast.

== Youth ==
The youth program oversees a parallel track at the LeiOUT Beach Tournament with separate divisions for middle school and high school students. It also puts on a six-night overnight summer camp for youth.
