= Romania at the 2019 World Beach Games =

- Flag of Romania
- IOC code: ROU

in Doha, Qatar 12 October 2019 – 16 October 2019
- Medals Ranked 31st: Gold 0 Silver 0 Bronze 3 Total 3

World Beach Games appearances
- 2019; 2023

Romania competed at the inaugural World Beach Games in Doha, Qatar from 12 to 16 October 2019. In total, athletes representing Romania won three bronze medals and the country finished in 31st place in the medal table.

== Medal summary ==
Medals by sport
Sport	1st place, gold medalist(s)	2nd place, silver medalist(s)	3rd place, bronze medalist(s)	Total
Aquathlon	0	0	1	1
Beach wrestling	0	0	2	2

=== Medalists ===
Medal	Name	Sport	Event
Bronze	Antoanela Manac	Aquathlon	Women's individual
Bronze	Ștefan Coman	Beach wrestling	Men's 70 kg
Bronze	Adina Popescu	Beach wrestling	Women's 70 kg
