= Beach handball at the 2019 World Beach Games =

World Beach Games competitions

- Venue: Al-Gharafa
- Dates: 9–15 October
- Competitors: 240

Beach handball competitions at the 2019 World Beach Games in Al Rayyan, Qatar are scheduled to be held from October 9 (a day before the opening ceremony) to October 14. The venue for the competition is located at Al-Gharafa. A total of twelve men's and twelve women's teams (each consisting up to 10 athletes) competed in each tournament. This means a total of 240 athletes are scheduled to compete.

== Qualification ==
Each National Olympic Committee might enter up to one men's and one women's team in the handball tournaments. The qualification processes for the men's and women's events were similar. The host country was guaranteed an entry in each event, as was the Top five Beach Handball World Championships. 6 more spots were awarded to the winners of continental qualification tournaments (for Africa, Asia, Europe, North America, Oceania, and South America).

=== Men's qualification ===
Mean of qualification	Date	Host	Vacancies	Qualified
Host nation	14 June 2019	(Switzerland) Lausanne	1	Qatar
2018 World Championship	24–29 July 2018	(Russia) Kazan	5	Brazil Croatia Hungary Sweden Spain
2019 Oceania Beach Handball Championship	21–24 February 2019	(Australia) Glenelg	1	Australia
2019 North American and the Caribbean Beach Handball Championship	11–14 June 2019	(Trinidad and Tobago) Port of Spain	1	United States
2019 South and Central American Championship	11–14 June 2019	(Brazil) Rio de Janeiro	1	Uruguay
2019 African Beach Games	14–16 June 2019	(Cape Verde) Sal	1	Tunisia
2019 Asian Championship	15–22 June 2019	(China) Weihai	1	Oman
2019 European Championship	2–7 July 2019	(Poland) Stare Jabłonki	1	Denmark
Total			12	

=== Women's qualification ===
Mean of qualification	Date	Host	Vacancies	Qualified
2018 World Championship	24–29 July 2018	(Russia) Kazan	5	Greece Norway Brazil Spain Denmark
2019 Oceania Beach Handball Championship	21–24 February 2019	(Australia) Glenelg	1	Australia
2019 North American and the Caribbean Beach Handball Championship	11–14 June 2019	(Trinidad and Tobago) Port of Spain	1	United States
2019 South and Central American Championship	11–14 June 2019	(Brazil) Rio de Janeiro	1	Argentina
2019 African Beach Games	14–16 June 2019	(Cape Verde) Sal	1	Tunisia
2019 Asian Championship	15–22 June 2019	(China) Weihai	~~1~~ 2	China Vietnam
2019 European Championship	2–7 July 2019	(Poland) Stare Jabłonki	1	Hungary
Total			12	

== Medal summary ==
=== Medal table ===
* Host nation (Qatar)

Rank	Nation	Gold	Silver	Bronze	Total
1	Brazil	1	0	1	2
2	Denmark	1	0	0	1
3	Hungary	0	1	0	1
3	Spain	0	1	0	1
5	Sweden	0	0	1	1
Totals (5 entries)		2	2	2	6

=== Medalists ===
Event	Gold	Silver	Bronze
Men	Brazil	Spain	Sweden
Women	Denmark	Hungary	Brazil

== Participating nations ==
- Brazil (20)
- Croatia (10)
- Denmark (10)
- Greece (10)
- Hungary (10)
- Norway (10)
- Spain (20)
- Sweden (10)
- United States (20)
