= Philippines at the 2019 World Beach Games =

- IOC code: PHI
- NOC: Philippine Olympic Committee
- Website: www.olympic.ph

in Doha 12 October 2019 – 16 October 2019
- Competitors: 2 (1 man and 1 woman) in 2 sports
- Officials: 4
- Medals: Gold 0 Silver 0 Bronze 0 Total 0

World Beach Games appearances
- 2019; 2023

The Philippines competed at the inaugural World Beach Games in Doha, Qatar from 10 to 12 October 2019. The country was represented by two athletes in two sports; aquathlete Claire Adorna and skateboarder Jericho Francisco. They were accompanied by four officials with Tom Carrasco as the delegation's chef de mission.

== Competitors ==
Sport	Men	Women	Total
Aquathlon	0	1	1
Skateboarding	1	0	1
Total	1	1	2

== Aquathlon ==
Athlete	Run	Trans 1	Swim	Trans 2	Run	Total Time	Rank
Claire Adorna	10:24	00:37	11:54	00:39	11:53	35:27	25

== Skateboarding ==
Athlete	Event	Preliminary		Final	
Athlete	Event	Result	Rank	Result	Rank
Jericho Francisco	Men's park	45.00	5 Q	49.00	6
