= Mongolia at the 2019 World Beach Games =

- Flag of Mongolia
- IOC code: MGL

in Doha, Qatar 12 October 2019 – 16 October 2019
- Medals Ranked 32nd: Gold 0 Silver 0 Bronze 1 Total 1

World Beach Games appearances
- 2019; 2023

Mongolia competed at the inaugural World Beach Games in Doha, Qatar from 12 to 16 October 2019. In total, athletes representing Mongolia won one bronze medal and the country finished in 32nd place in the medal table.

== Medal summary ==
Medals by sport
Sport	1st place, gold medalist(s)	2nd place, silver medalist(s)	3rd place, bronze medalist(s)	Total
3x3 basketball	0	0	1	1

=== Medalists ===
Medal	Name	Sport	Event
Bronze	Gantsolmongiin Gan-Erdene; Ariunboldyn Anand; Chuluunbaataryn Ikhbayar; Batsaikhany Altangerel	3x3 basketball	Men's tournament
