= Pakistan at the 2019 World Beach Games =

- Flag of Pakistan
- IOC code: PAK

in Doha, Qatar 12 October 2019 – 16 October 2019
- Medals Ranked 14th: Gold 1 Silver 0 Bronze 0 Total 1

World Beach Games appearances
- 2019; 2023

Pakistan competed at the inaugural World Beach Games in Doha, Qatar from 12 to 16 October 2019. In total, athletes representing Pakistan won one gold medal and the country finished in 14th place in the medal table.

== Medal summary ==
Medals by sport
Sport	1st place, gold medalist(s)	2nd place, silver medalist(s)	3rd place, bronze medalist(s)	Total
Beach wrestling	1	0	0	1

=== Medalists ===
Medal	Name	Sport	Event
Gold	Muhammad Inam	Beach wrestling	Men's 90 kg
