= Belarus at the 2019 World Beach Games =

- Flag of Belarus
- IOC code: BLR

in Doha, Qatar 12 October 2019 – 16 October 2019
- Medals Ranked 9th: Gold 1 Silver 1 Bronze 1 Total 3

World Beach Games appearances
- 2019; 2023

Belarus competed at the inaugural World Beach Games in Doha, Qatar from 12 to 16 October 2019. In total, athletes representing Belarus won one gold medal, one silver medal and one bronze medal. The country finished in 9th place in the medal table.

== Medal summary ==
Medals by sport
Sport	1st place, gold medalist(s)	2nd place, silver medalist(s)	3rd place, bronze medalist(s)	Total
Water skiing	1	1	1	3

=== Medalists ===
Medal	Name	Sport	Event
Gold	Aliaksandra Danisheuskaya	Water skiing	Women's jump
Silver	Stepan Shpak	Water skiing	Men's jump
Bronze	Hanna Straltsova	Water skiing	Women's jump
