= Irina Glimakova =

Russian tennis and Beach player

Irina Glimakova Ирина Глимакова
- Country (sports): Russia
- Born: 17 July 1993 (age 31)
- Plays: Right-handed (two-handed backhand)
Medal record
World Beach Games
Bronze medal – third place	2019 Doha	Doubles

Irina Aleksandrovna Glimakova (Russian: Ирина Александровна Глимакова; born 17 June 1993) is a Russian former professional tennis player. and currently a professional Beach tennis player.

== Tennis career ==
She has won three doubles titles on the ITF Women's Circuit. On 24 October 2011, she reached her best doubles ranking of world No. 491. Glimakova retirement from professional tennis in 2014. She decided to follow the Beach tennis was part of the.

== Beach Tennis career ==
Since 2014 she is a professional Beach Tennis player.On 19 September 2016, she reached her best ranking world No. 9 ranking.

In 2019 October Glimakova partnering Daria Churakova she played for Russia in the 2019 World Beach Games in Doha (Qatar) where she won the bronze medal in women's doubles.
