= Georgia at the 2019 World Beach Games =

- Flag of Georgia
- IOC code: GEO

in Doha, Qatar 12 October 2019 – 16 October 2019
- Medals Ranked 7th: Gold 2 Silver 1 Bronze 1 Total 4

World Beach Games appearances
- 2019; 2023

Georgia competed at the inaugural World Beach Games in Doha, Qatar from 12 to 16 October 2019. In total, athletes representing Georgia won two gold medals, one silver medal and one bronze medal. The country finished in 7th place in the medal table.

== Medal summary ==
Medals by sport
Sport	1st place, gold medalist(s)	2nd place, silver medalist(s)	3rd place, bronze medalist(s)	Total
Beach wrestling	2	1	1	4

=== Medalists ===
Medal	Name	Sport	Event
Gold	Levan Kelekhsashvili	Beach wrestling	Men's 70 kg
Gold	Davit Khutsishvili	Beach wrestling	Men's 80 kg
Silver	Dato Marsagishvili	Beach wrestling	Men's 90 kg
Bronze	Mamuka Kordzaia	Beach wrestling	Men's +90 kg
