= Iran at the 2019 World Beach Games =

- Flag of Iran
- IOC code: IRI

in Doha, Qatar 12 October 2019 – 16 October 2019
- Medals Ranked 20th: Gold 0 Silver 1 Bronze 1 Total 2

World Beach Games appearances
- 2019; 2023

Iran (officially the Islamic Republic of Iran) competed at the inaugural World Beach Games in Doha, Qatar from 12 to 16 October 2019. In total, athletes representing Iran originally won one gold medal, one silver medal and one bronze medal. In February 2021 however, Iran's gold medallist, Pouya Rahmani, was found guilty of doping offences committed at the Games. He was stripped of his medal.

== Medal summary ==
Medals by sport
| Sport | 1st place, gold medalist(s) | 2nd place, silver medalist(s) | 3rd place, bronze medalist(s) | Total |
|---|---|---|---|---|
| Karate kata | 0 | 1 | 0 | 1 |
| Beach soccer | 0 | 0 | 1 | 1 |

=== Medalists ===
| Medal | Name | Sport | Event |
|---|---|---|---|
| ~~Gold~~ | ~~Pouya Rahmani~~ | ~~Beach wrestling~~ | ~~Men's +90 kg~~ |
| Silver | Fatemeh Sadeghi | Karate kata | Women's individual kata |
| Bronze | Men's team | Beach soccer | Men's tournament |
