= Brazil at the 2019 World Beach Games =

- Flag of Brazil
- IOC code: BRA

in Doha, Qatar 12 October 2019 – 16 October 2019
- Medals Ranked 2nd: Gold 5 Silver 4 Bronze 3 Total 12

World Beach Games appearances
- 2019; 2023

Brazil competed at the inaugural World Beach Games in Doha, Qatar from 12 to 16 October 2019. In total, athletes representing Brazil won five gold medals, four silver medals and three bronze medals. The country finished in 2nd place in the medal table.

== Medal summary ==
Medals by sport
Sport	1st place, gold medalist(s)	2nd place, silver medalist(s)	3rd place, bronze medalist(s)	Total
3x3 basketball	0	1	0	1
4x4 beach volleyball	0	1	0	1
Beach handball	1	0	1	2
Beach soccer	1	0	1	2
Beach tennis	1	2	1	4
Beach wrestling	1	0	0	1
Open water swimming	1	0	0	1

=== Medalists ===
Medal	Name	Sport	Event
Gold	Men's team	Beach handball	Men's tournament
Gold	Men's team	Beach soccer	Men's tournament
Gold	André Baran; Rafaella Miiller	Beach tennis	Mixed doubles
Gold	Kamila Barbosa	Beach wrestling	Women's 50 kg
Gold	Ana Marcela Cunha	Open water swimming	Women's 5 km
Silver	William Weihermann; Leonardo Branquinho; Fabrício Veríssimo; Matheus Leite	3x3 basketball	Men's tournament
Silver	Fernanda Alves; Bárbara Seixas; Rebecca Cavalcanti; Tainá Bigi; Juliana Silva; Carolina Horta	4x4 beach volleyball	Women's tournament
Silver	André Baran; Vinícius Font	Beach tennis	Men's doubles
Silver	Joana Cortez; Rafaella Miiller	Beach tennis	Women's doubles
Bronze	Women's team	Beach handball	Women's tournament
Bronze	Women's team	Beach soccer	Women's tournament
Bronze	Vinícius Font; Joana Cortez	Beach tennis	Mixed doubles
