= Saeid Piramoun =

Iranian football player

Personal information
- Full name: ‌‌
- Date of birth: 2 February 1995 (age 31)
- Place of birth: Zahedan, Iran
- Position: Defender

Team information
- Current team: Pars Junobi Jam

International career
Years	Team	Apps	(Gls)
- Iran national beach soccer team
Medal record
Representing Iran
Men's beach soccer
Asian Beach Games
Gold medal – first place	2026 Sanya

Saeid Piramoun (born 2 February 1995 in Zahedan, Chabahar, Baluchestan) is a player of the Iranian national beach soccer team who plays in the position of defender. With the beach soccer team, he won the Intercontinental Cup in the UAE once.

During the Mahsa Amini protests, Piramoun was banned from the team for supporting and participating in the protests by pulling out his hair.
