= Beach handball at the 2019 World Beach Games – Women's tournament =

World Beach Games – Women's tournament

2019 Beach handball at the 2019 World Beach Games
Tournament details
- Host country: Qatar
- Venue: 1 (in 1 host city)
- Dates: 11–16 October
- Teams: 12 (from 5 confederations)

Final positions
- Champions: Denmark
- Runners-up: Hungary
- Third place: Brazil
- Fourth place: Vietnam

The 2019 Women's Beach handball at the World Beach Games will be the first edition of the tournament, held at Doha, Qatar from 11 to 16 October 2019.

== Qualification ==
Mean of qualification	Date	Host	Vacancies	Qualified
Host nation	14 June 2019	(Switzerland) Lausanne	~~1~~	~~Qatar~~
2018 World Championship	24–29 July 2018	(Russia) Kazan	5	Greece Norway Brazil Spain Denmark
2019 Oceania Beach Handball Championship	21–24 February 2019	(Australia) Glenelg	1	Australia
2019 North American and the Caribbean Beach Handball Championship	11–14 June 2019	(Trinidad and Tobago) Port of Spain	1	United States
2019 South and Central American Championship	11–14 June 2019	(Brazil) Rio de Janeiro	1	Argentina
2019 African Beach Games	14–16 June 2019	(Cape Verde) Sal	1	Tunisia
2019 Asian Championship	15–22 June 2019	(China) Weihai	~~1~~ 2	China Vietnam
2019 European Championship	2–7 July 2019	(Poland) Stare Jabłonki	1	Hungary
Total			12	

== Draw ==
The draw was held on 27 August 2019 at Doha, Qatar.

== Preliminary round ==
All times are local (UTC+3).

=== Group A ===
Pos	Team	Pld	W	L	Pts	SW	SL	SR	SPW	SPL	SPR	Qualification
1	Brazil	5	5	0	10	10	0	MAX	175	106	1.651	Quarter finals
2	Argentina	5	4	1	8	8	2	4.000	186	148	1.257	Quarter finals
3	Denmark	5	3	2	6	6	5	1.200	159	143	1.112	Quarter finals
4	Hungary	5	2	3	4	6	6	1.000	165	160	1.031	Quarter finals
5	United States	5	1	4	2	3	8	0.375	148	184	0.804	9-12th Place Semifinals
6	Tunisia	5	0	5	0	0	10	0.000	95	197	0.482	9-12th Place Semifinals

Source: Table
Rules for classification: 1) Points; 2) Head-to-head points; 3) Head-to-head set difference; 4) Head-to-head points won; 5) Set difference; 6) Points won; 7) Draw.

=== Group B ===
Pos	Team	Pld	W	L	Pts	SW	SL	SR	SPW	SPL	SPR	Qualification
1	Greece	5	5	0	10	10	2	5.000	206	162	1.272	Quarter finals
2	Spain	5	4	1	8	9	4	2.250	186	146	1.274	Quarter finals
3	Vietnam	5	3	2	6	7	5	1.400	219	178	1.230	Quarter finals
4	Poland	5	2	3	4	7	6	1.167	186	182	1.022	Quarter finals
5	China	5	1	4	2	2	8	0.250	154	218	0.706	9-12th Place Semifinals
6	Australia	5	0	5	0	0	10	0.000	121	187	0.647	9-12th Place Semifinals

Source: Table
Rules for classification: 1) Points; 2) Head-to-head points; 3) Head-to-head set difference; 4) Head-to-head points won; 5) Set difference; 6) Points won; 7) Draw.

== Knockout stage ==
=== Championship bracket ===
Quarterfinals
A1	Brazil	14	20
B4	Poland	12	8
A3	Denmark	23	22
B2	Spain	19	20
A2	Argentina	22	20	8
B3	Vietnam	31	16	9
A4	Hungary	15	16
B1	Greece	14	14

Semifinals
A1	Brazil	20	20	4
A3	Denmark	23	16	7
B3	Vietnam	14	12
A4	Hungary	25	16

Finals
A3	Denmark	21	15
A4	Hungary	19	14
Third place
A1	Brazil	26	23
B3	Vietnam	14	18

=== 5–8th place bracket ===
5–8th place semifinals
B4	Poland	18	14	9
B2	Spain	17	15	8
A2	Argentina	19	25
B1	Greece	18	16

Fifth place game
B4	Poland	15	20
A2	Argentina	14	10
Seventh place game
B2	Spain	20	19	5
B1	Greece	16	26	7

=== 9–12th place bracket ===
9–12th place semifinals
A5	United States	22	20
B6	Australia	10	15
A6	Tunisia	16	6
B5	China	21	15

Ninth place game
A5	United States	24	16	4
B5	China	16	24	5
Eleventh place game
B6	Australia	14	13
A6	Tunisia	13	11

== Final ranking ==
Rank	Team
1st place, gold medalist(s)	Denmark
2nd place, silver medalist(s)	Hungary
3rd place, bronze medalist(s)	Brazil
4	Vietnam
5	Poland
6	Argentina
7	Greece
8	Spain
9	China
10	United States
11	Australia
12	Tunisia
