= Russia at the 2019 World Beach Games =

- IOC code: RUS
- NOC: Russian Olympic Committee

in Doha, Qatar 12 – 16 October 2019
- Competitors: 55 (29 men and 26 women) in 9 sports
- Medals Ranked 6th: Gold 2 Silver 2 Bronze 3 Total 7

World Beach Games appearances
- 2019; 2023

Russia competed at the inaugural World Beach Games in Doha, Qatar from 12 to 16 October 2019. A total of 55 sportsmen competed in 9 sports.

== Medalists ==
Medal	Name	Sport	Event	Date
Gold	Vladimir Ryanzin	Waterskiing	Men's jump	14 October
Gold	Daniil Abramovskii; Vasilii Berdnikov; Dmitrii Cheburkin; Ivan Khramov	3x3 basketball	Men's tournament	16 October
Silver	Denis Adeev	Open water swimming	Men's 5 km	13 October
Silver	Pavel Bazhenov; Yuri Krasheninnikov; Aleksey Makarov; Boris Nikonorov; Andrei Novikov; Ivan Ostrovskii; Artur Paporotnyi; Aleksei Pavlenko; Kirill Romanov; Dmitry Shishin; Anton Shkarin; Fedor Zemskov	Beach soccer	Men's tournament	16 October
Bronze	Elena Kalinina	Sailing	Women's kitefoil racing	15 October
Bronze	Daria Churakova; Irina Glimakova	Beach tennis	Women's doubles	15 October
Bronze	Nikita Burmakin; Sergey Kuptsov	Beach tennis	Men's doubles	15 October

Medals by sport
Sport	1st place, gold medalist(s)	2nd place, silver medalist(s)	3rd place, bronze medalist(s)	Total
3x3 basketball	1	0	0	1
Waterskiing	1	0	0	1
Beach soccer	0	1	0	1
Open water swimming	0	1	0	1
Beach tennis	0	0	2	2
Sailing	0	0	1	1
Total	2	2	3	7

Medals by date
Day	Date	1st place, gold medalist(s)	2nd place, silver medalist(s)	3rd place, bronze medalist(s)	Total
Day 1	13 October	0	1	0	1
Day 2	14 October	1	0	0	1
Day 3	15 October	0	0	3	3
Day 4	16 October	1	1	0	2
Total		2	2	3	7

== Competitors ==
Sport	Men	Women	Total
3x3 basketball	4	4	8
Aquathlon	1	1	2
Beach soccer	12	10	22
Beach tennis	4	4	8
Bouldering	2	1	3
Kitefoil racing	1	1	2
Open water swimming	2	2	4
Skateboarding Park	2	2	4
Waterskiing	1	1	2
Total	29	26	55
