= Hungary at the 2019 World Beach Games =

- Flag of Hungary
- IOC code: HUN

in Doha, Qatar 12 October 2019 – 16 October 2019
- Medals Ranked 18th: Gold 0 Silver 3 Bronze 1 Total 4

World Beach Games appearances
- 2019; 2023

Hungary competed at the inaugural World Beach Games in Doha, Qatar from 12 to 16 October 2019. In total athletes representing Hungary won three silver medals and one bronze medal. The country finished in 18th place in the medal table.

== Medal summary ==
Medals by sport
Sport	1st place, gold medalist(s)	2nd place, silver medalist(s)	3rd place, bronze medalist(s)	Total
Aquathlon	0	1	1	2
Beach handball	0	1	0	1
Beach wrestling	0	1	0	1

=== Medalists ===
Medal	Name	Sport	Event
Silver	Márk Dévay	Aquathlon	Men's individual
Silver	Women's team	Beach handball	Women's tournament
Silver	Zsanett Németh	Beach wrestling	Women's +70 kg
Bronze	Márta Kropkó; Márk Dévay	Aquathlon	Mixed relay
