= China at the 2019 World Beach Games =

- Flag of China
- IOC code: CHN

in Doha, Qatar 12 October 2019 – 16 October 2019
- Medals Ranked 21st: Gold 0 Silver 1 Bronze 1 Total 2

World Beach Games appearances
- 2019; 2023

China competed at the inaugural World Beach Games in Doha, Qatar from 12 to 16 October 2019. In total, athletes representing China won one silver medal and one bronze medal. The country finished in 21st place in the medal table.

== Medal summary ==
Medals by sport
Sport	1st place, gold medalist(s)	2nd place, silver medalist(s)	3rd place, bronze medalist(s)	Total
Open water swimming	0	1	0	1
3x3 basketball	0	0	1	1

=== Medalists ===
Medal	Name	Sport	Event
Silver	Hou Yawen	Open water swimming	Women's 5 km
Bronze	Women's team	3x3 basketball	Women's tournament
