= Puerto Rico at the 2019 World Beach Games =

- Flag of Puerto Rico
- IOC code: PUR

in Doha, Qatar 12 October 2019 – 16 October 2019
- Medals Ranked 23rd: Gold 0 Silver 1 Bronze 0 Total 1

World Beach Games appearances
- 2019; 2023

Puerto Rico competed at the inaugural World Beach Games in Doha, Qatar, from 12 to 16 October 2019. In total, athletes representing Puerto Rico won one silver medal, and the country finished in 23rd place in the medal table.

== Medal summary ==
Medals by sport
Sport	1st place, gold medalist(s)	2nd place, silver medalist(s)	3rd place, bronze medalist(s)	Total
Skateboarding	0	1	0	1

=== Medalists ===
Medal	Name	Sport	Event
Silver	Steven Piñeiro	Skateboarding	Men's park
