= Sweden at the 2019 World Beach Games =

- Flag of Sweden
- IOC code: SWE

in Doha, Qatar 12 October 2019 – 16 October 2019
- Medals Ranked 32nd: Gold 0 Silver 0 Bronze 1 Total 1

World Beach Games appearances
- 2019; 2023

Sweden competed at the inaugural World Beach Games in Doha, Qatar from 12 to 16 October 2019. In total, athletes representing Sweden won one bronze medal and the country finished in 32nd place in the medal table.

== Medal summary ==
Medals by sport
| Sport | 1st place, gold medalist(s) | 2nd place, silver medalist(s) | 3rd place, bronze medalist(s) | Total |
|---|---|---|---|---|
| Beach handball | 0 | 0 | 1 | 1 |

=== Medalists ===
| Medal | Name | Sport | Event |
|---|---|---|---|
| Bronze | Men's team | Beach handball | Men's tournament |
