= Beach soccer at the 2019 World Beach Games – Men's tournament =

2019 Men's beach soccer tournament at the World Beach Games
Tournament details
- Host country: Qatar
- City: Doha
- Dates: 11–16 October 2019
- Teams: 16 (from 6 confederations)
- Venue(s): 2 (in 1 host city)

Final positions
- Champions: Brazil (1st title)
- Runners-up: Russia
- Third place: Iran
- Fourth place: Italy

Tournament statistics
- Matches played: 28
- Goals scored: 279 (9.96 per match)

The men's beach soccer tournament at the 2019 World Beach Games in Doha, Qatar, the inaugural edition of the ANOC World Beach Games, took place over six days from 11–16 October. Held in tandem with the women's tournament, the two events comprised the beach soccer competition at this year's Games.

Organised by the Association of National Olympic Committees (ANOC), national associations of FIFA (beach soccer's governing body) from a territory with a National Olympic Committee (NOC) were invited to enter one team into preliminary qualification routes from which 16 teams, representing all six continental zones, advanced to the final competition; the hosts Qatar did not enter a team.

The tournament was a multi-stage competition, consisting of a round-robin group stage and followed by a single elimination knockout round, starting with the semi-finals and ending with the gold medal match, with all matches hosted on the Katara Beach.

Brazil claimed the gold medal after winning the final 9–3 against Russia who settled for silver. Meanwhile, Iran defeated Italy in the bronze medal match to claim the remaining place on the podium.

== Competition schedule ==
The tournament began on 11 October, one day before the opening ceremony, and ended on the final day of the Games, 16 October.

Matches deciding medal winners took place exclusively on 16 October.

G	Group stage	SF	Semi-finals	B	Bronze medal match	F	Final / Gold medal match

Fri 11	Sat 12	Sun 13	Mon 14	Tue 15	Wed 16	
G		G	G	SF	B	F

== Qualified teams ==
The six continental zones of FIFA were each allocated a share of 16 berths at the Games, ensuring all continents would be represented at the event. The following teams qualified from their zones via regional preliminary tournaments or based on their world ranking (hosts Qatar were eligible to enter a team automatically however declined to enter):

Means of qualification	Ref.	Dates	Venue	Berths	Qualified
2019 UEFA Qualifying Tournament		9–12 May 2019	(Spain) Salou	5	Italy; Russia; Spain; Switzerland; Ukraine
2019 African Beach Games		19–23 June 2019	(Cape Verde) Sal	2	Morocco; Senegal
BSWW World Ranking (Top ranked AFC teams)		10 July 2019^{[b]}	–	3	Iran; Japan; United Arab Emirates
BSWW World Ranking (Top ranked OFC team)		10 July 2019^{[b]}	–	1	Solomon Islands^{[a]}
2019 CONCACAF Qualifying Tournament		3–5 August 2019	(El Salvador) San Salvador	2	El Salvador; Mexico
BSWW World Ranking (Top ranked CONMEBOL teams)		23 August 2019^{[b]}	–	3	Brazil; Paraguay; Uruguay
Total				16	

a. Tahiti are the highest ranked team from the OFC. However, they are ineligible to enter since French Polynesia is not a member of ANOC. Therefore, the berth has been given to the OFC's next highest ranked team that is a member.
b. The dates of teams who qualified via their world ranking refer to when they were publicly revealed by the qualification organisers.

== Venues ==
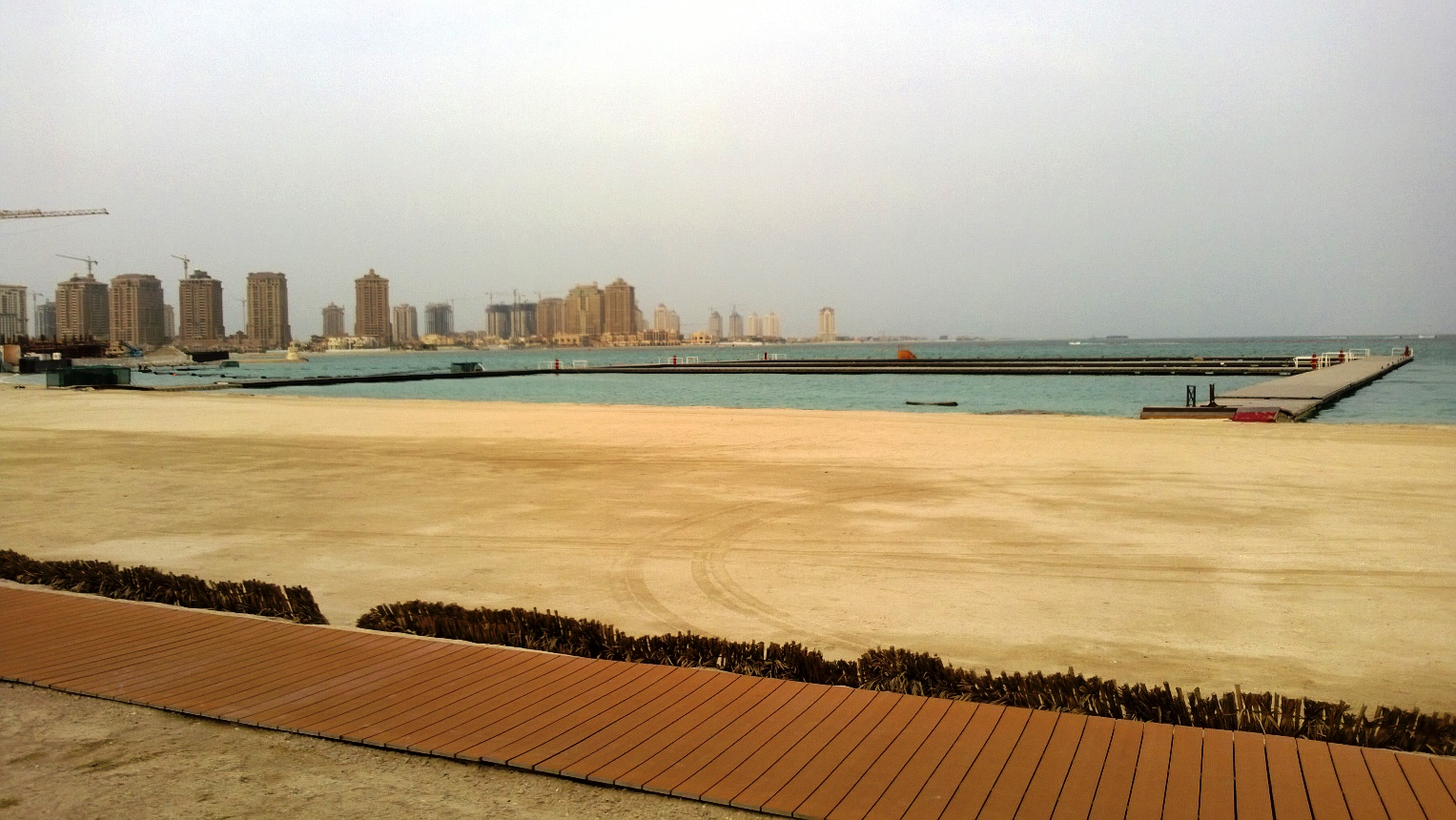
Katara Beach, Doha

The matches were held on the Katara Beach at the Beach Soccer Arena which consisted of two venues: the larger-capacity main stadium that hosted the majority of games and located adjacent, a smaller-capacity secondary stadium known as "Pitch 1" for all other matches which was only used during the group stage.

== Squads ==
Each team could enter a squad consisting of up to 12 players. A total of up to 192 athletes were expected to compete.

== Draw ==
The draw to split the 16 teams into four groups of four took place at 10:00 AST (UTC+3) on 27 August 2019 at the Lusail Sports Arena in Doha, Qatar. Beach Soccer Worldwide (BSWW) vice-president Joan Cusco oversaw the draw.

For the purpose of the draw, the 16 teams were split into four pots of four according to their world ranking with the highest ranked teams placed in Pot 1, down to the lowest ranked teams placed in Pot 4. One team from each pot was placed into each of the four groups. Teams from the same confederation could not be drawn into the same group, except for UEFA nations for which one group was permitted to contain two. At the start of the draw, two teams from Pot 1 were automatically allocated to the groups – Brazil, as the ranking leaders, were assigned to position A1 and Russia, as the second best ranked team, were assigned to position D1.

The composition of the pots is shown below (World Ranking in parentheses):

Pot 1	Pot 2	Pot 3	Pot 4
Brazil (1); (allocated to A1); Russia (2); (allocated to D1); Italy (4); Iran (5)	Paraguay (6); Spain (7); Switzerland (8); Japan (10)	Uruguay (11); Senegal (12); United Arab Emirates (13); Mexico (15)	Ukraine (19); Morocco (20); El Salvador (28); Solomon Islands (38)

== Group stage ==
Four of the 16 nations, the winners of each group, advance to the knockout stage.

All times are local, AST (UTC+3).

=== Group A ===
Pos	Team	Pld	W	W+	WP	L	GF	GA	GD	Pts	Qualification
1	Brazil	3	3	0	0	0	23	10	+13	9	Knockout stage
2	Switzerland	3	2	0	0	1	21	19	+2	6	
3	Morocco	3	1	0	0	2	8	17	−9	3	
4	United Arab Emirates	3	0	0	0	3	15	21	−6	0	

Source: ANOC
11 October 2019
22:30

Morocco	1–9	Brazil
El Hadoui 34'	Report(ru)	1', 9' Catarino; 6', 18', 33' Mauricinho; 7', 36' (pen.) Rodrigo; 16' Antonio; 27' Datinha

Stadium, Katara beach
11 October 2019
22:30

Switzerland	10–9	United Arab Emirates
Ott 5', 16', 16', 19'; Stankovic 15', 30'; Ostgen 16'; Mounoud 19'; Hodel 33'; Spacca 33'	Report(ru)	3' A. Mohammadi; 12', 22', 24' W. Beshr; 13', 23' Albloushi; 17' Alkaabi; 25' A. Ali; 36' H. Almuntaser

Pitch 1, Katara beach

13 October 2019
16:30

Brazil	7–5	United Arab Emirates
Rafinha 4'; Bokinha 6', 23'; Filipe Silva 14'; Rodrigo 26', 36'; A. Beshr 36' (o.g.)	Report(ru)	13', 15', 36' W. Mohammadi; 17' A. Mohammadi; 24' A. Ali

Stadium, Katara beach
13 October 2019
16:30

Switzerland	7–3	Morocco
Ott 3', 35'; Stankovic 21' (pen.), 22' (pen.), 29'; Hodel 26'; Borer 32'	Report(ru)	4' Aboutalbi; 5' El Hadoui; 9' Fanchy

Pitch 1, Katara beach

14 October 2019
21:00

Brazil	7–4	Switzerland
Rodrigo 1', 6', 8'; Filipe Silva 15'; Bokinha 17'; Catarino 20'; Antonio 28'	Report(ru)	6' Stankovic; 7', 29' Ott; 16' Spacca

Stadium, Katara beach
14 October 2019
21:00

United Arab Emirates	1–4	Morocco
A. Ali 21'	Report(ru)	1', 36' El Hadoui; 19' Abagli; 21' Iazal

Pitch 1, Katara beach

=== Group B ===
Pos	Team	Pld	W	W+	WP	L	GF	GA	GD	Pts	Qualification
1	Italy	3	3	0	0	0	18	12	+6	9	Knockout stage
2	Spain	3	2	0	0	1	21	13	+8	6	
3	Mexico	3	1	0	0	2	14	16	−2	3	
4	Solomon Islands	3	0	0	0	3	12	24	−12	0	

Source: ANOC
11 October 2019
16:30

Solomon Islands	5–8	Italy
Mafane 9', 16'; Fa'ari 15'; Laua 19', 36'	Report(ru)	9', 14', 36' Gori; 10' Corosiniti; 12' Zurlo; 18', 35' Palmacci; 21' Montani

Stadium, Katara beach
11 October 2019
16:30

Spain	9–3	Mexico
Acosta 1'; Chiky 4', 28'; Javi Torres 16', 22'; Adrian 21'; Eduard 30'; Llorenç 31'; Hernández 35'	Report(ru)	11' Contreras; 25', 29' Morales

Pitch 1, Katara beach

13 October 2019
22:30

Italy	5–3	Mexico
Gori 3', 13', 26'; Zurlo 5'; Palmacci 24'	Report(ru)	18', 22' Maldonado; 23' Vizcarra

Stadium, Katara beach
13 October 2019
22:30

Spain	8–5	Solomon Islands
Llorenç 9', 17'; Javi Torres 11'; Suarez 14', 19'; Frutos 26'; Chiky 30', 33'	Report(ru)	15', 36' Fa'ari; 15' Mafane; 23' Laua; 28' Farobo

Pitch 1, Katara beach

14 October 2019
19:30

Italy	5–4	Spain
Palmacci 16', 28'; Gori 19', 32'; Corosiniti 29'	Report(ru)	2' Frutos; 16' Chiky; 16' Javi Torres; 26' Cintas

Stadium, Katara beach
14 October 2019
19:30

Mexico	8–2	Solomon Islands
Vizcarra 1', 11', 32'; Maldonado 21', 35', 36'; Mosco 26'; Villa 33'	Report(ru)	5' Fa'ari; 26' Mafane

Pitch 1, Katara beach

=== Group C ===
Pos	Team	Pld	W	W+	WP	L	GF	GA	GD	Pts	Qualification
1	Iran	3	2	0	1	0	18	16	+2	7	Knockout stage
2	Senegal	3	2	0	0	1	18	13	+5	6	
3	Paraguay	3	1	0	0	2	9	12	−3	3	
4	Ukraine	3	0	0	0	3	13	17	−4	0	

Source: ANOC
11 October 2019
19:30

Ukraine	4–5	Iran
Glutskyi 1'; Zborovskyi 7', 9'; Shcherytsia 12'	Report(ru)	6' A. Akbari; 19', 20' M. Mokhtari; 25' Ahmadzadeh; 31' Shirmohammadi

Stadium, Katara beach
11 October 2019
19:30

Paraguay	0–3	Senegal
	Report(ru)	29' Diassy; 32' Diouf; 34' Diagne

Pitch 1, Katara beach

13 October 2019
21:00

Iran	8–8 (a.e.t.)	Senegal
Mokhtari 2', 35'; Akbari 3', 9'; Kiani 9', 33', 37'; Masoumizadeh 38'	Report(ru)	9', 10' Niang; 25', 26', 37' Diagne; 33', 37' Diatta; 34' Diassy
Penalties
Ahmadzadeh (penalty scored); Akbari (penalty scored); Kiani (penalty scored)	3–1	(penalty missed) Ndoye; (penalty scored) Fall

Stadium, Katara beach
13 October 2019
21:00

Paraguay	5–4	Ukraine
C. Benitez 8', 12', 25'; Ojeda 28'; Nerush 36' (o.g.)	Report(ru)	3', 11' Pashko; 12' Zborovskyi; 23' Makeiev

Pitch 1, Katara beach

14 October 2019
16:30

Iran	5–4	Paraguay
Mokhtari 3'; Barreto 16' (o.g.); Shirmohammadi 17'; Behzadpour 31'; Masoumizadeh 32'	Report(ru)	5' (pen.), 35' Carballo; 17' C. Benitez; 20' Rolón

Stadium, Katara beach
14 October 2019
16:30

Senegal	7–5	Ukraine
Mendy 11'; Niang 11'; Diatta 12'; Fall 24', 26'; Diassy 28'; Diagne 35'	Report(ru)	5', 11', 23' Voitenko; 15' (o.g.) Niang; 30' Nerush

Pitch 1, Katara beach

=== Group D ===
Pos	Team	Pld	W	W+	WP	L	GF	GA	GD	Pts	Qualification
1	Russia	3	2	1	0	0	15	10	+5	8	Knockout stage
2	Japan	3	2	0	0	1	16	10	+6	6	
3	El Salvador	3	1	0	0	2	9	10	−1	3	
4	Uruguay	3	0	0	0	3	7	17	−10	0	

Source: ANOC
11 October 2019
21:00

El Salvador	2–4	Russia
Perdomo 5'; Velásquez 18'	Report(ru)	2' Paporotnyi; 12', 25' Makarov; 27' Nikonorov

Stadium, Katara beach
Referee: Shao Liang (China)
11 October 2019
21:00

Japan	7–2	Uruguay
Okuyama 3', 8'; Ozu 15', 20', 32', 34'; Akaguma 26'	Report(ru)	18' Miranda; 35' Capurro

Pitch 1, Katara beach
Referee: Sofien Benchabane (France)

13 October 2019
19:30

Russia	5–3	Uruguay
Shishin 5'; Makarov 5'; Paporotnyi 8', 12', 15'	Report(ru)	5' L. Pazos; 14' Quinta; 32' G. Costa

Stadium, Katara beach
13 October 2019
19:30

Japan	4–2	El Salvador
Ozu 11'; Oba 21'; Akaguma 23'; Okuyama 36'	Report(ru)	29' Rivera; 32' Agustín

Pitch 1, Katara beach

14 October 2019
22:30

Russia	6–5 (a.e.t.)	Japan
Zemskov 6'; Krasheninnikov 7'; Paporotnyi 14', 39'; Bazhenov 16'; Makarov 22'	Report(ru)	1' Ginoza; 4' Yamauchi; 12', 19' (pen.) Okuyama; 34' Matsuo

Stadium, Katara beach
14 October 2019
22:30

Uruguay	2–5	El Salvador
Cabrera 27'; Laens 34'	Report(ru)	6', 7', 20' Jason; 12' Velásquez; 25' Agustín

Pitch 1, Katara beach

== Knockout stage ==
The winners of Groups C and D contest are drawn to contest semi-final 1 and the winners of Groups A and B contest semi-final 2.

Semi-finals
15 October
Iran	2
Russia	6
15 October
Brazil	7
Italy	5

Gold medal match
16 October
Russia	3
Brazil	9
Bronze medal match
16 October
Iran (p)	5 (3)
Italy	5 (1)

=== Semi-finals ===
15 October 2019
17:30

Iran	2–6	Russia
Masoumizadeh 21'; Mokhtari 23'	Report(ru)	5' Makarov; 8', 32' Zemskov; 12' Shishin; 34' Novikov; 35' Nikonorov

Stadium, Katara beach

15 October 2019
20:30

Brazil	7–5	Italy
Filipe Silva 5', 19'; Rodrigo 8', 14', 19'; Catarino 20'; Lucão 28'	Report(ru)	13', 26', 32' Gori; 14' Chiavaro; 25' Ramacciotti

Stadium, Katara beach

=== Bronze medal match ===
16 October 2019
17:30

Iran	5–5 (a.e.t.)	Italy
Masoumizadeh 3'; Mokhtari 6'; Ahmadzadeh 27'; Kiani 34', 35' (pen.)	Report(ru)	20', 25' Gori; 22' Montani; 25' Ramacciotti; 29' Frainetti
Penalties
Ahmadzadeh (penalty scored); Akbari (penalty scored); Kiani (penalty scored)	3–1	(penalty missed) Chiavaro; (penalty scored) Gori

Stadium, Katara beach

=== Gold medal match ===
16 October 2019
20:30

Russia	3–9	Brazil
Paporotnyi 19'; Zemskov 20'; Makarov 36' (pen.)	Report(ru)	8' Catarino; 8' Rodrigo; 17', 18', 19' Mauricinho; 24' Bokinha; 32' Filipe Silva; 36', 36' Lucão

Stadium, Katara beach

== Top goalscorers ==
Players with at least four goals are listed

13 goals

- (Italy) Gabriele Gori

10 goals

- (Brazil) Rodrigo

8 goals

- (Switzerland) Nöel Ott

7 goals

- (Iran) Mohammadali Mokhtari
- (Russia) Artur Paporotnyi

6 goals

- (Mexico) Jose Vizcarra
- (Brazil) Mauricinho
- (Russia) Aleksey Makarov
- (Switzerland) Dejan Stankovic

5 goals

- (Spain) Salavador "Chiky" Ardil
- (Japan) Ozu Moreira
- (Senegal) Mamour Diagne
- (Mexico) Ramon Maldonado
- (Brazil) Catarino
- (Brazil) Filipe Silva
- (Italy) Paolo Palmacci
- (Japan) Masanori Okuyama
- (Iran) Mostafa Kiani

4 goals

- (Paraguay) Carlos Benitez
- (Spain) Javi Torres
- (Solomon Islands) Max Fa'ari
- (Morocco) Nassim El Hadoui
- (Solomon Islands) Roy Mafane
- (Iran) Mohammad Masoumizadeh
- (Brazil) Bokinha
- (Russia) Fedor Zemskov

Source: BSRussia

== Final standings ==
Rank	Team	Result
1st place, gold medalist(s)	Brazil	Gold Medal
2nd place, silver medalist(s)	Russia	Silver Medal
3rd place, bronze medalist(s)	Iran	Bronze Medal
4	Italy	Fourth place
5	Spain	Eliminated in the group stage
6	Japan	Eliminated in the group stage
7	Senegal	Eliminated in the group stage
8	Switzerland	Eliminated in the group stage
9	El Salvador	Eliminated in the group stage
10	Mexico	Eliminated in the group stage
11	Paraguay	Eliminated in the group stage
12	Morocco	Eliminated in the group stage
13	Ukraine	Eliminated in the group stage
14	United Arab Emirates	Eliminated in the group stage
15	Uruguay	Eliminated in the group stage
16	Solomon Islands	Eliminated in the group stage

== See also ==
- Beach soccer at the 2019 World Beach Games – Women's tournament
- 2019 FIFA Beach Soccer World Cup
