= Germany at the 2019 World Beach Games =

- Flag of Germany
- IOC code: GER

in Doha, Qatar 12 October 2019 – 16 October 2019
- Medals Ranked 13th: Gold 1 Silver 0 Bronze 3 Total 4

World Beach Games appearances
- 2019; 2023

Germany competed at the inaugural World Beach Games in Doha, Qatar from 12 to 16 October 2019. In total, athletes representing Germany won one gold medal and three bronze medals. The country finished in 13th place in the medal table.

== Medal summary ==
Medals by sport
| Sport | 1st place, gold medalist(s) | 2nd place, silver medalist(s) | 3rd place, bronze medalist(s) | Total |
|---|---|---|---|---|
| Sailing | 1 | 0 | 0 | 1 |
| Open water swimming | 0 | 0 | 2 | 2 |
| Bouldering | 0 | 0 | 1 | 1 |

=== Medalists ===
| Medal | Name | Sport | Event |
|---|---|---|---|
| Gold | Florian Gruber | Sailing | Men's KiteFoil |
| Bronze | Sören Meißner | Open water swimming | Men's 5 km |
| Bronze | Leonie Beck | Open water swimming | Women's 5 km |
| Bronze | Philipp Martin | Bouldering | Men's bouldering |
