= Turkey at the 2019 World Beach Games =

- Flag of Turkey
- IOC code: TUR

in Doha, Qatar 12 October 2019 – 16 October 2019
- Medals Ranked 19th: Gold 0 Silver 2 Bronze 0 Total 2

World Beach Games appearances
- 2019; 2023

Turkey competed at the inaugural World Beach Games in Doha, Qatar from 12 to 16 October 2019. In total, athletes representing Turkey won two silver medals and the country finished in 19th place in the medal table.

== Medal summary ==
Medals by sport
Sport	1st place, gold medalist(s)	2nd place, silver medalist(s)	3rd place, bronze medalist(s)	Total
Beach wrestling	0	2	0	2

=== Medalists ===
Medal	Name	Sport	Event
Silver	Ufuk Yılmaz	Beach wrestling	Men's +90 kg
Silver	Mehlika Öztürk	Beach wrestling	Women's 60 kg
