= Beach wrestling at the 2019 World Beach Games =

Beach wrestling at the 2019 World Beach Games in Doha, Qatar was held on 14 and 15 October 2019. The competitions were held on Katara Beach.

In February 2021, the gold medal won by Pouya Rahmani of Iran (men's +90 kg) and the silver medal won by Mercy Genesis of Nigeria (women's 50 kg) were forfeited due to anti-doping rule violations. The Association of National Olympic Committees (ANOC) subsequently reallocated the medals.

== Medalists ==
| Event | Gold | Silver | Bronze |
|---|---|---|---|
| Men's 70 kg | Levan Kelekhsashvili; Georgia | Panah Ilyasli; Azerbaijan | Ștefan Coman; Romania |
| Men's 80 kg | Davit Khutsishvili; Georgia | Ibrahim Yusubov; Azerbaijan | Vasyl Mykhailov; Ukraine |
| Men's 90 kg | Muhammad Inam; Pakistan | Dato Marsagishvili; Georgia | Pedro García; Spain |
| Men's +90 kg | Ufuk Yılmaz; Turkey | Mamuka Kordzaia; Georgia | Oyan Nazariani; Azerbaijan |
| Women's 50 kg | Kamila Barbosa; Brazil | Miglena Selishka; Bulgaria | Ștefania Priceputu; Romania |
| Women's 60 kg | Francesca Indelicato; Italy | Mehlika Öztürk; Turkey | Shauna Kemp; United States |
| Women's 70 kg | Tatiana Rentería; Colombia | Alina Berezhna; Ukraine | Adina Popescu; Romania |
| Women's +70 kg | Blessing Onyebuchi; Nigeria | Zsanett Németh; Hungary | Iryna Pasichnyk; Ukraine |
