= France at the 2019 World Beach Games =

- Flag of France
- IOC code: FRA

in Doha, Qatar 12 October 2019 – 16 October 2019
- Medals Ranked 8th: Gold 1 Silver 2 Bronze 0 Total 3

World Beach Games appearances
- 2019; 2023

France competed at the inaugural World Beach Games in Doha, Qatar from 12 to 16 October 2019. In total, athletes representing France won one gold medal and two silver medals. The country finished in 8th place in the medal table.

== Medal summary ==
Medals by sport
Sport	1st place, gold medalist(s)	2nd place, silver medalist(s)	3rd place, bronze medalist(s)	Total
3x3 basketball	1	0	0	1
Beach tennis	0	1	0	1
Sailing	0	1	0	1

=== Medalists ===
Medal	Name	Sport	Event
Gold	Women's team	3x3 basketball	Women's tournament
Silver	Nicolas Gianotti; Marie-Eve Hoarau	Beach tennis	Mixed doubles
Silver	Nicolas Parlier	Sailing	Men's KiteFoil
