= Great Britain at the 2019 World Beach Games =

- Flag of Great Britain
- IOC code: GBR

in Doha, Qatar 12 October 2019 – 16 October 2019
- Medals Ranked 21st: Gold 0 Silver 1 Bronze 1 Total 2

World Beach Games appearances
- 2019; 2023

Great Britain competed at the inaugural World Beach Games in Doha, Qatar from 12 to 16 October 2019. In total, athletes representing Great Britain won one silver medal and one bronze medal. The country finished in 21st place in the medal table.

== Medal summary ==
Medals by sport
Sport	1st place, gold medalist(s)	2nd place, silver medalist(s)	3rd place, bronze medalist(s)	Total
Beach soccer	0	1	0	1
Sailing	0	0	1	1

=== Medalists ===
Medal	Name	Sport	Event
Silver	Women's team	Beach soccer	Women's tournament
Bronze	Guy Bridge	Sailing	Men's KiteFoil
