= Netherlands at the 2019 World Beach Games =

- Flag of the Netherlands
- IOC code: NED

in Doha, Qatar 12 October 2019 – 16 October 2019
- Medals Ranked 11th: Gold 1 Silver 1 Bronze 0 Total 2

World Beach Games appearances
- 2019; 2023

Netherlands competed at the inaugural World Beach Games in Doha, Qatar from 12 to 16 October 2019. In total, athletes representing Netherlands won one gold medal and one silver medal. The country finished in 11th place in the medal table.

== Medal summary ==
Medals by sport
Sport	1st place, gold medalist(s)	2nd place, silver medalist(s)	3rd place, bronze medalist(s)	Total
Water skiing	1	0	0	1
3x3 basketball	0	1	0	1

=== Medalists ===
Medal	Name	Sport	Event
Gold	Sanne Meijer	Water skiing	Women's wakeboarding
Silver	Myrthe den Heeten; Esther Fokke; Fleur Kuijt; Charlotte van Kleef	3x3 basketball	Women's tournament
