= Venezuela at the 2019 World Beach Games =

- Flag of Venezuela
- IOC code: VEN

in Doha, Qatar 12 October 2019 – 16 October 2019
- Medals Ranked 32nd: Gold 0 Silver 0 Bronze 1 Total 1

World Beach Games appearances
- 2019; 2023

Venezuela competed at the inaugural World Beach Games in Doha, Qatar from 12 to 16 October 2019. In total, athletes representing Venezuela won one bronze medal and the country finished in 32nd place in the medal table.

== Medal summary ==
Medals by sport
Sport	1st place, gold medalist(s)	2nd place, silver medalist(s)	3rd place, bronze medalist(s)	Total
Karate kata	0	0	1	1

=== Medalists ===
Medal	Name	Sport	Event
Bronze	Antonio Díaz	Karate kata	Men's individual kata
