= Spain at the 2019 World Beach Games =

- Flag of Spain
- IOC code: ESP

in Doha, Qatar 12 October 2019 – 16 October 2019
- Medals Ranked 1st: Gold 7 Silver 1 Bronze 2 Total 10

World Beach Games appearances
- 2019; 2023

Spain competed at the inaugural World Beach Games in Doha, Qatar from 12 to 16 October 2019. In total, athletes representing Spain won seven gold medals, one silver medal and two bronze medals. The country finished in 1st place in the medal table.

== Medal summary ==
Medals by sport
Sport	1st place, gold medalist(s)	2nd place, silver medalist(s)	3rd place, bronze medalist(s)	Total
Aquathlon	3	0	0	3
Beach handball	0	1	0	1
Beach soccer	1	0	0	1
Beach tennis	1	0	0	1
Beach wrestling	0	0	1	1
Karate kata	2	0	0	2
Skateboarding	0	0	1	1

=== Medalists ===
Medal	Name	Sport	Event
Gold	Kevin Viñuela	Aquathlon	Men's individual
Gold	Francisca Tous	Aquathlon	Women's individual
Gold	Francisca Tous; Kevin Viñuela	Aquathlon	Mixed relay
Gold	Women's team	Beach soccer	Women's tournament
Gold	Antonio Ramos; Gerard Rodríguez	Beach tennis	Men's doubles
Gold	Damián Quintero	Karate kata	Men's individual kata
Gold	Women's individual kata	Karate kata	Women's individual kata
Silver	Men's team	Beach handball	Men's tournament
Bronze	Pedro García	Beach wrestling	Men's 90 kg
Bronze	Julia Benedetti	Skateboarding	Women's park
