= Colombia at the 2019 World Beach Games =

- Flag of Colombia
- IOC code: COL
- NOC: Colombian Olympic Committee
- Website: www.olimpicocol.co (in Spanish)

in Doha, Qatar 12 October 2019 – 16 October 2019
- Medals Ranked 13th: Gold 1 Silver 0 Bronze 0 Total 1

World Beach Games appearances
- 2019; 2023

Colombia competed at the inaugural World Beach Games in Doha, Qatar from 12 to 16 October 2019. In total, athletes representing Colombia won one gold medal and the country finished in 14th place in the medal table.

== Medal summary ==
Medals by sport
Sport	1st place, gold medalist(s)	2nd place, silver medalist(s)	3rd place, bronze medalist(s)	Total
Beach wrestling	1	0	0	1

=== Medalists ===
Medal	Name	Sport	Event
Gold	Tatiana Rentería	Beach wrestling	Women's 70 kg
