= Japan at the 2019 World Beach Games =

- Flag of Japan
- IOC code: JPN

in Doha, Qatar 12 October 2019 – 16 October 2019
- Competitors: 25 (19 men and 6 women)
- Flag bearer: Miho Nonaka
- Medals Ranked 5th: Gold 3 Silver 2 Bronze 0 Total 5

World Beach Games appearances
- 2019; 2023

Japan competed at the inaugural World Beach Games in Doha, Qatar from 12 to 16 October 2019. In total, athletes representing Japan won three gold medals and two silver medals. The country finished in 8th place in the medal table.

== Medal summary ==
Medals by sport
Sport	1st place, gold medalist(s)	2nd place, silver medalist(s)	3rd place, bronze medalist(s)	Total
Bouldering	2	1	0	3
Skateboarding	1	1	0	2

=== Medalists ===
Medal	Name	Sport	Event
Gold	Kai Harada	Bouldering	Men's bouldering
Gold	Miho Nonaka	Bouldering	Women's bouldering
Gold	Sakura Yosozumi	Skateboarding	Women's park
Silver	Keita Watabe	Bouldering	Men's bouldering
Silver	Kihana Ogawa	Skateboarding	Women's park
