= 2019 World Beach Games =

Inaugural event of the World Beach Games

ANOC World Beach Games 2019
- Host city: Doha
- Country: Qatar
- Nations: 97
- Athletes: 1,237
- Events: 36 in 13 sports (14 disciplines)
- Opening: 12 October
- Closing: 16 October
- Opened by: Sheikh Joaan bin Hamad bin Khalifa Al Thani
- Website: www.awbgqatar.com

The 2019 World Beach Games, (Arabic: 2019 ألعاب شاطئ العالم) officially known as the ANOC World Beach Games Qatar 2019 and commonly known as Qatar 2019, was the inaugural edition of the international beach and water multi-sport event organized by the Association of National Olympic Committees (ANOC). It was held for five days from 11 to 16 October 2019, in Doha, Qatar, with 110 medals contested across 14 disciplines.

It had originally been scheduled to be hosted in San Diego, United States in 2017. However, after first being postponed to 2019, the Games were then relocated as the city had not generated sufficient private funds needed to stage the event. In June 2019, Doha was announced as the last-minute replacement host city.

Spain were the best performing nation, claiming seven gold medals ahead of Brazil's five; hosts Qatar finished with one medal (silver). ANOC declared the event a success; a survey of the participating NOCs rated the Games an average of 8.65 out of 10.

== Host selection ==
The application process to host the Games was opened in July 2015 with a deadline of the end of the month for submissions. Five cities ultimately put bids forward: two cities in the United States (San Diego, California and Sarasota, Florida) as well as Sochi, Russia, Dubai, United Arab Emirates, and an undisclosed Chinese city. Barcelona, Spain and Istanbul, Turkey had also previously expressed interest. San Diego emerged as the preferred bidder and was subject to a vote by the ANOC General Assembly at a meeting in Washington, D.C., on 30 October 2015; the result was the unanimous approval of the city to be hosts of the inaugural Games.

I World Beach Games bidding results
City	Nation	Votes
San Diego	United States	Unanimous
Dubai	United Arab Emirates	—
Sarasota	United States	—
Sochi	Russia	—
Undisclosed	China	—

The Games were originally scheduled to be held from 29 September to 9 October 2017. However, on 5 August 2016, the event was announced as postponed until 2019 to allow for more preparation time. Then, on 30 May 2019, ANOC stripped San Diego of its hosting rights, after the local organisers failed to generate enough private funding (reportedly $40 million) to hold the Games in the city.

ANOC immediately began negotiations to find replacement hosts. Just two weeks later, on 14 June 2019, Doha, Qatar was announced as the new host city, after ANOC was assured of funding from the country's government. This left just four months for Doha to prepare to stage the Games before the scheduled October start date but successfully delivered the event on time.

== Development and preparation ==
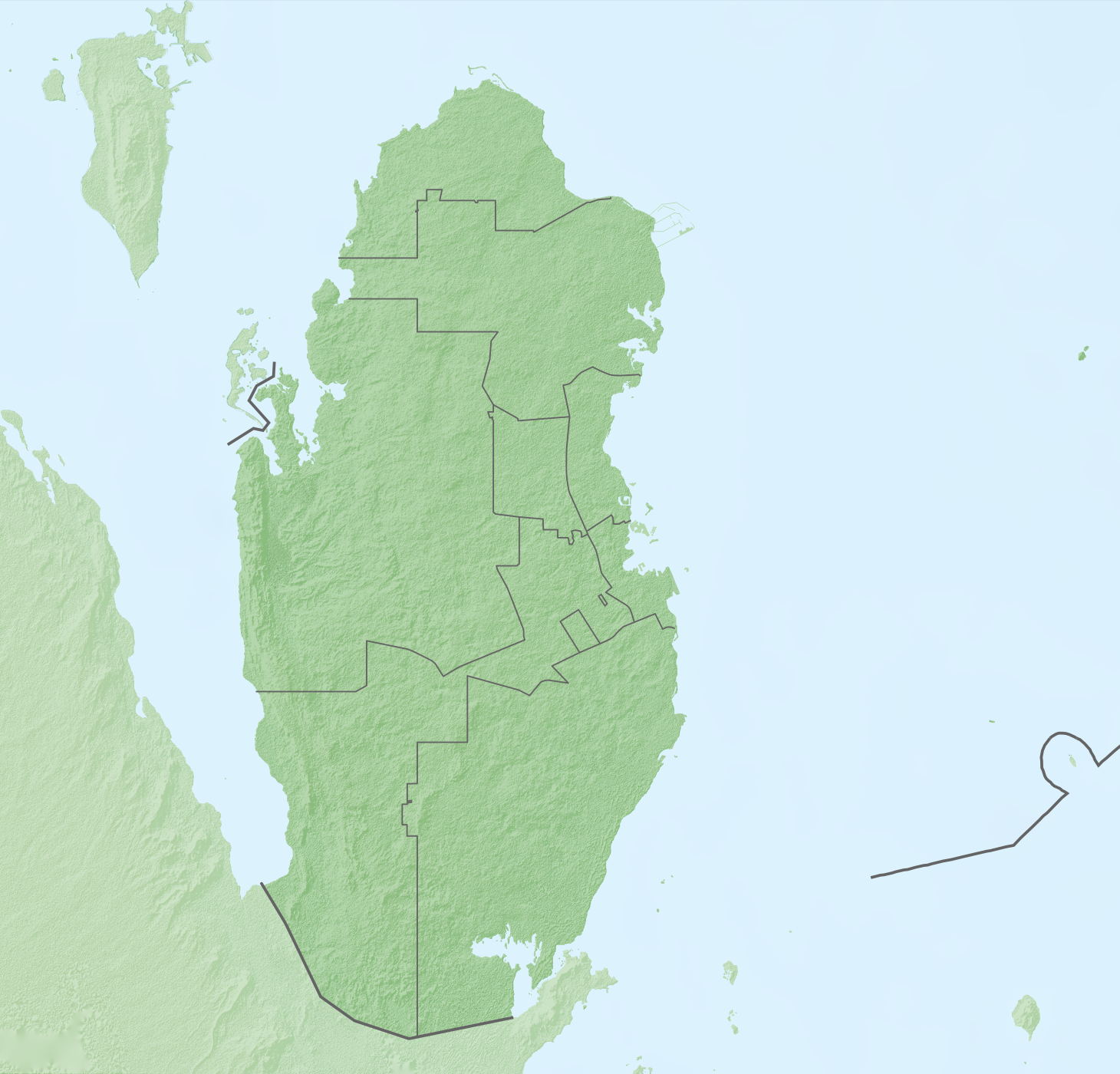
Location of Doha in Qatar

=== Venues ===
- Katara Beach (3x3 basketball, kitefoil racing, open water swimming, aquathlon, individual kata, beach wrestling, beach tennis, beach soccer)
- Al Gharrafa (beach handball, beach volleyball)
- Aspire Zone (bouldering, skateboarding)
- Legtafiya Lagoon (waterski jump, wakeboard)

== The Games ==
=== Sports ===
The 2019 ANOC World Beach Games featured 14 disciplines in 13 sports. All of the events in this edition were non-Olympic events, i.e., different from events in previous Summer Olympic programs, and were gender equal.

1. Basketball
  - 3x3 basketball (2)
2. Football
  - Beach soccer (2)
3. Handball
  - Beach handball (2)
4. Karate
  - Karate (2)
5. Sailing
  - Kiteboarding (2)
6. Skateboarding
  - Park skateboarding
7. Sport climbing
  - Bouldering (2)
8. Swimming
  - Open water swimming (2)
9. Tennis
  - Beach tennis (2)
10. Triathlon
  - Aquathlon (3)
11. Volleyball
  - 4x4 beach volleyball (2)
12. Waterskiing
  - Wakeboarding (2)
  - Waterski jumping (2)
13. Wrestling
  - Beach wrestling (8)

Numbers in parentheses indicate the number of medal events contested in each separate discipline.

==== Scrapped sports ====
BMX freestyle and surfing had also been on the original programme but were removed. The former was confirmed as scrapped in January 2019 as a cost-cutting measure when the Games were still due to be held in San Diego. The latter was unable to be held in Doha due to a lack of suitable waves; ANOC still planned to have the surfing take place at a later date, under the Games' branding, and likely to be in the original venue of San Diego. However, in February 2020, the International Surfing Association (ISA) and ANOC agreed to cancel the planned event due to a busy calendar.

=== Participating National Olympic Committees (NOCs) ===
Of the world's 206 NOCs, 97 competed:

Participating National Olympic Committees
- American Samoa (1)
- Argentina (26)
- Aruba (2)
- Australia (41)
- Austria (5)
- Azerbaijan (7)
- Barbados (1)
- Belarus (3)
- Belgium (1)
- Botswana (2)
- Brazil (78)
- Bulgaria (3)
- Cambodia (1)
- Cameroon (1)
- Canada (15)
- Cape Verde (10)
- Chile (10)
- China (24)
- Colombia (8)
- Ivory Coast (4)
- Croatia (15)
- Czech Republic (13)
- Denmark (28)
- Dominica (11)
- Ecuador (6)
- El Salvador (12)
- Finland (2)
- France (28)
- The Gambia (6)
- Georgia (4)
- Germany (20)
- Great Britain (20)
- Greece (17)
- Hong Kong (5)
- Hungary (34)
- Indonesia (12)
- Iran (17)
- Ireland (2)
- Israel (3)
- Italy (32)
- Japan (24)
- Jordan (8)
- Kazakhstan (3)
- South Korea (3)
- Kuwait (2)
- Latvia (6)
- Liberia (2)
- Luxembourg (2)
- Madagascar (4)
- Malaysia (2)
- Mali (4)
- Mauritius (1)
- Mexico (30)
- Mongolia (8)
- Montenegro (1)
- Morocco (18)
- Mozambique (6)
- Namibia (4)
- Netherlands (9)
- New Zealand (5)
- Nigeria (8)
- Oman (12)
- Pakistan (1)
- Panama (1)
- Paraguay (22)
- Peru (6)
- Philippines (2)
- Poland (23)
- Portugal (14)
- Puerto Rico (5)
- Qatar (69) (hosts)
- Romania (10)
- Russia (55)
- San Marino (2)
- Senegal (12)
- Serbia (2)
- Singapore (1)
- Slovakia (4)
- Slovenia (10)
- Solomon Islands (12)
- Spain (64)
- Suriname (1)
- Sweden (13)
- Switzerland (15)
- Chinese Taipei (5)
- Thailand (3)
- Togo (8)
- Tunisia (20)
- Turkey (12)
- Uganda (7)
- Ukraine (33)
- United Arab Emirates (12)
- United States (61)
- Uruguay (23)
- Vanuatu (6)
- Venezuela (18)
- Vietnam (12)

=== Calendar ===
All dates are AST (UTC+3)

OC	Opening ceremony	●	Event competitions	1	Event finals	CC	Closing ceremony

October 2019	11th Fri	12th Sat	13th Sun	14th Mon	15th Tue	16th Wed	Events
Ceremonies		OC				CC	—N/a
Triathlon – Aquathlon				2	1		3
Basketball – 3x3 basketball			●	●	●	2	2
Sport climbing – Bouldering			●	2			2
Handball – Beach handball	●	●	●	●	●	2	2
Karate – Individual kata		●	2				2
Sailing – Kitefoil racing			●	●	1	1	2
Skateboarding – Park				1	1		2
Football – Beach soccer	●		●	●	●	2	2
Swimming – Open water			2				2
Tennis – Beach tennis		●	●	●	2	1	3
Beach volleyball – 4x4		●	●	●	●	2	2
Waterskiing – Waterski Jump			●	2			2
Waterskiing – Wakeboard			●	2			2
Wrestling – Beach wrestling				4	4		8

== Medal table ==
In February 2021, two medal winning athletes (one from Iran and one from Nigeria) were found guilty of doping offences committed at the Games. They were stripped of their medals which were subsequently reallocated.

* Host nation (Qatar)

Rank	Nation	Gold	Silver	Bronze	Total
1	Spain (ESP)	7	1	2	10
2	Brazil (BRA)	5	4	3	12
3	Italy (ITA)	4	1	1	6
4	United States (USA)	4	0	4	8
5	Japan (JPN)	3	2	0	5
6	Russia (RUS)	2	2	3	7
7	Georgia (GEO)	2	2	0	4
8	France (FRA)	1	2	0	3
9	Belarus (BLR)	1	1	1	3
10	Netherlands (NED)	1	1	0	2
10	Turkey (TUR)	1	1	0	2
12	Germany (GER)	1	0	3	4
13	Colombia (COL)	1	0	0	1
13	Denmark (DEN)	1	0	0	1
13	Nigeria (NGR)	1	0	0	1
13	Pakistan (PAK)	1	0	0	1
17	Azerbaijan (AZE)	0	4	2	6
18	Hungary (HUN)	0	3	1	4
19	Ukraine (UKR)	0	1	2	3
20	China (CHN)	0	1	1	2
20	Great Britain (GBR)	0	1	1	2
20	Iran (IRI)	0	1	1	2
23	Australia (AUS)	0	1	0	1
23	Bulgaria (BUL)	0	1	0	1
23	Chinese Taipei (TPE)	0	1	0	1
23	Finland (FIN)	0	1	0	1
23	Poland (POL)	0	1	0	1
23	Puerto Rico (PUR)	0	1	0	1
23	Qatar (QAT)*	0	1	0	1
23	Switzerland (SUI)	0	1	0	1
31	Romania (ROU)	0	0	4	4
32	Canada (CAN)	0	0	1	1
32	Chile (CHI)	0	0	1	1
32	Dominican Republic (DOM)	0	0	1	1
32	Hong Kong (HKG)	0	0	1	1
32	Indonesia (INA)	0	0	1	1
32	Mongolia (MGL)	0	0	1	1
32	Slovenia (SLO)	0	0	1	1
32	Sweden (SWE)	0	0	1	1
32	Venezuela (VEN)	0	0	1	1
Totals (40 entries)		36	36	38	110

== See also ==
- 2019 African Beach Games
- 2019 Mediterranean Beach Games
- 2019 South American Beach Games
