= Italy at the 2019 World Beach Games =

- Flag of Italy
- IOC code: ITA

in Doha, Qatar 12 October 2019 – 16 October 2019
- Medals Ranked 3rd: Gold 4 Silver 1 Bronze 1 Total 6

World Beach Games appearances
- 2019; 2023

Italy competed at the inaugural World Beach Games in Doha, Qatar from 12 to 16 October 2019. In total, athletes representing Italy won four gold medals, one silver medal and one bronze medal. The country finished in 9th place in the medal table.

== Medal summary ==
Medals by sport
Sport	1st place, gold medalist(s)	2nd place, silver medalist(s)	3rd place, bronze medalist(s)	Total
Beach tennis	1	0	0	1
Beach wrestling	1	0	0	1
Open water swimming	1	0	0	1
Skateboarding	0	0	1	1
Water skiing	1	1	0	2

=== Medalists ===
Medal	Name	Sport	Event
Gold	Flaminia Daina; Nicole Nobile	Beach tennis	Women's doubles
Gold	Francesca Indelicato	Beach wrestling	Women's 60 kg
Gold	Marcello Guidi	Open water swimming	Men's 5 km
Gold	Massimiliano Piffaretti	Water skiing	Men's wakeboarding
Silver	Alice Virag	Water skiing	Women's wakeboarding
Bronze	Alessandro Mazzara	Skateboarding	Men's park
