= Ukraine at the 2019 World Beach Games =

- Flag of Ukraine
- IOC code: UKR

in Doha, Qatar 12 October 2019 – 16 October 2019
- Medals Ranked 20th: Gold 0 Silver 1 Bronze 2 Total 3

World Beach Games appearances
- 2019; 2023

Ukraine competed at the inaugural World Beach Games in Doha, Qatar from 12 to 16 October 2019. In total, athletes representing Ukraine won one silver medal and two bronze medals. The country finished in 20th place in the medal table.

== Medal summary ==
Medals by sport
Sport	1st place, gold medalist(s)	2nd place, silver medalist(s)	3rd place, bronze medalist(s)	Total
Beach wrestling	0	1	2	3

=== Medalists ===
Medal	Name	Sport	Event
Silver	Alina Berezhna	Beach wrestling	Women's 70 kg
Bronze	Vasyl Mykhailov	Beach wrestling	Men's 80 kg
Bronze	Iryna Pasichnyk	Beach wrestling	Women's +70 kg
