= United States at the 2019 World Beach Games =

- Flag of the United States
- IOC code: USA

in Doha, Qatar 12 October 2019 – 16 October 2019
- Medals Ranked 4th: Gold 4 Silver 0 Bronze 4 Total 8

World Beach Games appearances
- 2019; 2023

United States competed at the inaugural World Beach Games in Doha, Qatar from 12 to 16 October 2019. In total, athletes representing United States won four gold medals and four bronze medals. The country finished in 4th place in the medal table.

== Medal summary ==
Medals by sport
Sport	1st place, gold medalist(s)	2nd place, silver medalist(s)	3rd place, bronze medalist(s)	Total
4x4 beach volleyball	2	0	0	2
Beach wrestling	0	0	1	1
Karate kata	0	0	1	1
Sailing	1	0	0	1
Skateboarding	1	0	0	1
Water skiing	0	0	2	2

=== Medalists ===
Medal	Name	Sport	Event
Gold	Men's team	4x4 beach volleyball	Men's tournament
Gold	Women's team	4x4 beach volleyball	Women's tournament
Gold	Daniela Moroz	Sailing	Women's KiteFoil
Gold	Heimana Reynolds	Skateboarding	Men's park
Bronze	Shauna Kemp	Beach wrestling	Women's 60 kg
Bronze	Gakuji Tozaki	Karate kata	Men's individual kata
Bronze	Guenther Oka	Water skiing	Men's wakeboarding
Bronze	Jamie Lopina	Water skiing	Women's wakeboarding
