= Vahid =

- Gender: Male

Origin
- Meaning: Unique, The One

Other names
- Related names: Wahid, Vahide, Vehid

Vahid (Persian: وحيد), also spelt Vahit, is the Turkish, Kurdish, Persian and Bosnian variant of the Arabic masculine given name Wahid, meaning "The One", "Unique". People named Vahid include:

== Given name ==
=== Vahid ===
- Vahid Abasov (born 1997), Serbian boxer
- Vahid Ahmadov (born 1957), Azerbaijani politician and parliamentarian
- Vahid Alaghband (born 1952), British commodities trader
- Vahid Alakbarov (born 1950), Russian businessman and oligarch
- Vahid Aliabadi (born 1990), Iranian footballer
- Vahid Aliyev (born 1969), Azerbaijani general
- Vahid Amiri (born 1988), Iranian footballer
- Vahid Asgari (born 1985), Iranian footballer
- Vahid Asghari (born 1986), Iranian journalist, activist and political prisoner
- Vahid Aziz (born 1945), Azerbaijani poet and translator
- Vahid Bayatlou (born 1987), Iranian footballer and manager
- Vahid Dalirzahan (born 1995), Iranian basketballer
- Vahid Dasgardi (died 1942), Iranian poet, writer and journalist
- Vahid Evazzadeh, Iranian filmmaker and theatre director
- Vahid Fazeli (born 1982), Iranian footballer, coach and manager
- Vahid Ghelich (born 1957), Iranian footballer
- Vahid Ghiasi (born 1975), Iranian futsal player and coach
- Vahid Halilhodžić (born 1952), Bosnian football manager
- Vahid Hambo (born 1995), Finnish footballer of Bosnian descent
- Vahid Hamdinejad (born 1982), Iranian footballer
- Vahid Hashemian (born 1976), Iranian footballer
- Vahid Heydarieh (born 1993), Iranian footballer
- Vahid Jalalzadeh (born 1968), Iranian politician
- Vahid Jalilvand (born 1976), Iranian filmmaker and actor
- Vahid Kheshtan (born 1992), Iranian footballer
- Vahid Mirzadeh (born 1986), American tennis player
- Vahid Mohammadzadeh (born 1989), Iranian footballer
- Vahid Musayev (died 1999), Azerbaijani general and politician
- Vahid Mustafayev (born 1968), Azerbaijani journalist, filmmaker and businessman
- Vahid Najafi (born 1994), Iranian footballer
- Vahid Najafi Nakhjevanlou (born 1988), Iranian writer, researcher and environmental activist
- Vahid Namdari (born 2000), Iranian footballer
- Vahid Nemati (born 1988), Iranian footballer
- Vahid Nouri (born 1989), Iranian Paralympic judoka
- Vahid Online, anonymous Iranian blogger and internet activist
- Vahid Paloch (born 1986), Iranian footballer
- Vahid Rahbani (born 1979), Iranian actor
- Vahid Rezaei, Iranian footballer and manager
- Vahid Sarlak (born 1981), Iranian-German judoka
- Vahid Sayadi Nasiri (1980–2018), Iranian human rights activist and political prisoner
- Vahid Selimović (born 1997), Luxembourg footballer
- Vahid Seyed-Abbasi, Iranian volleyball player
- Vahid Shafiei (born 1992), Iranian futsal player
- Vahid Shamsaei (born 1975), Iranian futsal player
- Vahid Sheikhveisi (born 1987), Iranian footballer
- Vahid Talebloo (born 1992), Iranian footballer
- Vahid Tarokh (born c. 1967), Iranian academic
- Vahid Zimonjić (born 2000), Serbian footballer

=== Vahit ===
- Vahit Kirişci (born 1960), Turkish politician
- Vahit Melih Halefoğlu (1919–2017), Turkish politician and diplomat
- Vahit Emre Savaş (born 1995), Turkish volleyball player

== Middle name ==
- Hossein Vahid Khorasani (1921–2026), Iranian grand ayatollah
- Mohammad Vahid Esmaeilbeigi (born 1992), Iranian footballer
- Mohammad Taher Vahid Qazvini (died 1700), Iranian bureaucrat, poet and historian

== Surname ==
- Aliagha Vahid (1895–1965), Azerbaijani poet
- Majid Vahid (born 2000), Iranian judoka and kurash
- Mina Vahid (born 1987), Iranian actress

== See also ==
- Vahid Bridge, bridge in Isfahan, Iran
- Vahide, feminine form of the name
- Vahid-Dastjerdi, Iranian surname
- Vahid, Iran, village in Khuzestan
