= Sarlak (disambiguation) =

Sarlak is a clan from the Bakhtiyari tribe and a village in Lorestan Province, Iran.

Sarlak may also refer to:

== Other places ==
- Sarlak, Republic of Bashkortostan, Russia
- Sarlak, a district in Tabriz, Iran

== People ==
- Alireza Sarlak, Iranian freestyle wrestler
- Hamed Sarlak, Iranian footballer
- Milad Sarlak, Iranian footballer
- Siamak Sarlak, Iranian footballer
- Vahid Sarlak, Iranian judoka

== See also ==
- Sarlacc, a creature from the Star Wars franchise.
