= Bayatılar =

1989 song by Eldar Mansurov

Single by Brilliant Dadashova

from the album Bayatı
- Released: 1989
- Studio: Gosteleradio Azerbaijan SSR
- Genre: Pop
- Length: 5:52
- Label: Melodiya
- Composer: Eldar Mansurov
- Lyricist: Vahid Aziz
- Producer: Rafig Babayev

Music video
- "Bayatılar" on YouTube

"Bayatılar" is a song by Azerbaijani musician Eldar Mansurov with lyrics by Vahid Aziz and performed by Brilliant Dadashova. The song was released in 1989 in Azerbaijan, Russia, Turkey, Turkmenistan, Europe, the Arab world and Brazil. In 1991, the song was released on the compilation album Bayatı on Melodiya, the Soviet state label, alongside songs by Aygun Kazimova and Firangiz Rehimbeyli.

The music to the song was used as a soundtrack in Promises (2001) documentary film.

== Other versions and sampling ==
"Bayatılar" has been covered, interpolated and sampled in songs by many other artists, such as in the following:

- 1990: Ashkhabad - "Bayaty" (Turkmenistan)
- 1990: Reno - "Zdrastvuy" (Russia)
- 1995: Sezen Aksu - "Zalim" (Turkey)
- 1995: Levent Yüksel - "Zalim" (Turkey) - cover of Sezen Aksu's "Zalim"
- 1995: Petros Dourdoubakis and Petros Dourdoumpakis - "Taxidiariko Pouli" (Greece)
- 1997: Dimitra Galani - "Oses Foties" (Greece)
- 1998: Monica Salmaso - "Bayatı" (Brazil)
- 2002: Grinsteins Mischpoche - "Bayatı" (Germany)
- 2003: Katy Garbi - "Esena Mono" (Greece)
- 2003: Vasilis Lekkas - "Taxidiariko Pouli" (Greece)
- 2004: Dino Merlin - "Subota" (Bosnia and Herzegovina)
- 2005: Seray Sever - "İçim yanıyor" (Turkey)
- 2005: Brazilian Girls - "Don't Stop" (United States)
- 2006: Dilek Budak - "Adını Yıldızlara" (Turkey)
- 2006: Ziyoda - "Yollarim" (Uzbekistan)
- 2006: Lachyn Mammedowa - "Yalnyz yuregim" (Turkmenistan)
- 2006: Aygun Kazimova - "Bayatılar" (Azerbaijan)
- 2006: Hüseyn Karadayı and DJ Funky C - "Miracles" (Turkey) - based on Levent Yüksel's "Zalim"
- 2006: DJ Pantelis - "I Have a Dream" (Greece) - based on Levent Yüksel's "Zalim"
- 2006: The Guzek Trio - "Bayati" (UK)
- 2007: Çalar Saat - "Zalim" (Turkey) - cover of Sezen Aksu's "Zalim"
- 2008: Milad və Mohammad - "Are Faghat To" (Iran)
- 2008: Brilliant Dadashova - "Bayatılar Remix" (Azerbaijan)
- 2009: Edward Maya and Vika Jigulina - "Stereo Love" (Romania)
- 2009: Cantodiscanto - "Bayati" (Italy)
- 2009: Mikhail Mirzabekov - "Bayatilar"
- 2010: Edward Maya and Mia Martina - "Stereo Love" (Canada) - remix of Edward Maya and Vika Jigulina's "Stereo Love"
- 2010: PJ feat. Velvet - "Stereo Love" (Sweden) - cover of Edward Maya and Vika Jigulina's "Stereo Love"
- 2010: Ivan Zak - "Dečko sa Balkana (Stereo Love)" (Croatia) - cover of Edward Maya and Vika Jigulina's "Stereo Love"
- 2010: Benjamim Taubkin - "Bayaty" (Brazil)
- 2012: Saltanath - "Zalim" (Turkey) - cover of Sezen Aksu's "Zalim"
- 2012: Aydan Kaya - "Zalim" (Turkey) - cover of Sezen Aksu's "Zalim"
- 2012: Matthaios Tsahouridis - "Zalim/Bayatilar" (Greece)
- 2013: Bengü - "Zalim" (Turkey) - cover of Sezen Aksu's "Zalim"
- 2013: Babbe Rabbe - "Bayatilar" (Israel)
- 2014: Dobranotch - "Bayatilar" (Russia)
- 2014: Abash - "Bayati" (Italy)
- 2019: Drenchill - "Never, Never" (Portugal)
- 2020: Why So Sad - "Out of Time" (Germany)
- 2021: Dimitri Vegas & Like Mike, Timmy Trumpet and Edward Maya - "Feel Your Love" - contains elements of "Stereo Love"
- 2023: Tanishk Bagchi and Edward Maya - "Love Stereo Again" (India)
- 2025: Enisa, Cheat Codes, Edward Maya - "Be Your Friend" (Albania)

== Copyright issues ==
=== Stereo Love ===
In the autumn of 2009, during his stay in Greece, Azerbaijani composer Eldar Mansurov heard the song "Stereo Love" and contacted the Romanian Police, claiming the melody in the chorus was taken from his popular 1989 composition "Bayatılar". In the music video, the composer of "Stereo Love" was only listed as anonymous. The office confirmed with Edward Maya that he had in fact copied Mansurov's work. He admitted to have been fascinated by an accordion version of "Bayatılar" which he had come across online in early 2009 and claimed to have tried to contact the author but had been unable to due to his busy schedule. On 19 January 2010, Edward Maya signed an agreement with Eldar Mansurov in Baku, Azerbaijan, confirming their co-authorship of "Stereo Love".

=== Esena Mono ===
Greek singer Katy Garbi used the modified version of melody of Bayatılar in the song "Esena Mono" from the album Emmones Idees (2008). Mansurov sued Dimitris Kontopulos (composer) and Sony Music Entertainment Hellas AE (publisher) for stealing his original work in 2011. The Greek court said that the similarity between 2 songs are more than 50 percent. The entire process finished in 2023 in favor of Mansurov.

== See also ==
- Eldar Mansurov
- Vahid Aziz
