= Capitals of Iran =

List of capital cities in Iran

The various states and civilizations in Iran (Persia) have had numerous capital cities and royal centers throughout history.

- Ahar; Pishkinid dynasty
- Anshan; pre-Achaemenid era
- Ardabil; early Safavid era, Sajid
- Asaak; Parthian era royal center
- Astara; Ispahbads of Gilan
- Alamut Castle; Nizari Ismaili state
- Amol; Ziyarid, Alavid, Marashis, Dabuyid, Bavandid, Chalavi, (Parthian Empire climate capital)
- Babylon; Achaemenid era
- Baghdad; caliphates, Jalayerid, Buyid
- Balkh; in legend, the governmental center of the Kayanian dynasty
- Bardsir; Banu Ilyas
- Basra; Jalayerid
- Bukhara; Samanid era
- Ctesiphon; Parthian, Sasanian era
- Damavand; Masmughans of Damavand
- Dinavar; Hasanwayhids
- Diyarbakır; Aq Qoyunlu
- Fuman; Dabuyid
- Farim (Perim); Bavandid
- Firozkoh; Ghurid
- Firuzkuh; Chalavi
- Shahr-e Qumis (Hecatompylos); Parthian era
- Ghazna; Ghurid, Khwarazmid, Ghaznavid
- Gor (Firuzabad); Sasanian era
- Gorgan (Astarabad); Ziyarid, Alavids
- Herat; Ghurid, Kartids, Timurid Empire
- Hulwan; Annazids
- Ij (Ig); Shabankara
- Isfahan; Ziyarid dynasty, Kakuyid Emirate, Injuid dynasty, Seljuk era, Safavid era
- Istakhr; Sasanian era
- Izeh (Idaj); Hazaraspids
- Ecbatana (later Hamadan); Median Empire, Achaemenid era, Eldiguzids, Seljuks (Greater and Iraq Seljuks)
- Kerman; Muzaffarid, Qutlugh-Khanids
- Khorramabad; Khorshidi dynasty
- Kunya Urgench; early Khwarezmid era
- Lafur; Qarinvand dynasty
- Lankaran; Talysh Khanate
- Lahijan; Karkiya dynasty
- Maragheh; Ilkhanid, Ahmadilis, Sajid
- Mashhad; Malik Mahmud Sistani, Afsharid, Suleiman II Safavi, Autonomous Government of Khorasan
- Merv; capital during al-Mamun's caliphate, Seljuk Empire
- Mosul; winter capital during Qara Qoyunlu
- Nakhchivan; Eldiguzids
- Nishapur; Taherid, Simjurid, Lili ibn al-Nu'man, Seljuk, Muayyid eras
- Nisa, Turkmenistan; periodical capital of the Parthian era
- Pasargadae; Achaemenid
- Persepolis; Achaemenid ceremonial capital
- Rey (Rhagae); Median, Ziyarid, Buyid, Seljuk Empire
- Rudbar; Justanids
- Qaen; Muhtashams of Quhistan a branch of Nizari Ismaili State
- Qazvin; early Safavid era
- Sari; Qajar, Dabuyid, Alavid, Bavandid, Marashis
- Sabzevar; Sarbadars
- Samarkand; Samanid, Khwarazmid, Timurid era
- Shiraz; Buyid dynasty, Injuid dynasty, Muzaffarid dynasty, Salghurid dynasty, Zand era
- Soltaniyeh; Ilkhanid
- Susa; Achaemenid, Parthian era
- Tabriz; Ilkhanid, Khwarezmid, Rawadid, Chupanid, Jalayerid, Eldiguzids, Kara Koyunlu, Aq Qoyunlu, early Safavid era
- Tabas; Amir Gilaki Dyansty
- Tarom; Sallarid
- Tun; Muhtashams of Quhistan a branch of Nizari Ismaili State
- Tus; Jauni Qurbani Dynasty
- Yazd; Kakuyid, Atabegs of Yazd
- Zaranj; Saffarid dynasty, Mihrabanid, Nasrid
- Tehran; Qajar era, Pahlavi era, Islamic Republic of Iran 1796–present

== See also ==
- Iran
- Ancient Iran
- Afghanistan
