= Wahida =

Wahida or Waheeda (Arabic: وحيدة) is an Arabic feminine given name, the feminine form of Wahid or Waheed, which mean "peerless" or "unique". Notable people with the given name include:

- Um Hanadi (real name Wahida Mohamed al-Jumaily; born 1978), Iraqi militant fighter and commander
- Wahida al-Khalidi, Palestinian women's rights activist
- Waheeda Akhtar (born 1995), Pakistani cricketer
- Wahida Amiri, Afghan librarian and women's rights activist
- Wahida Clark, American author
- Wahida Faizi (born 1994), Afghan journalist
- Ferdous Akhter Wahida, Bangladeshi politician
- Wahida Dridi, Tunisian actress
- Wahida Mollick Jolly, Bangladeshi actress
- Wahida Prism Khan (born 1972), Indian naval surgeon
- Waheeda Naseem (1927–1996), Pakistani novelist and writer
- Waheeda Rehman (born 1938), Indian actress
- Syeda Wahida Sabrina (born 2000), Bangladeshi actress
