= World Beach Wrestling Championships =

Annual beach wrestling competition

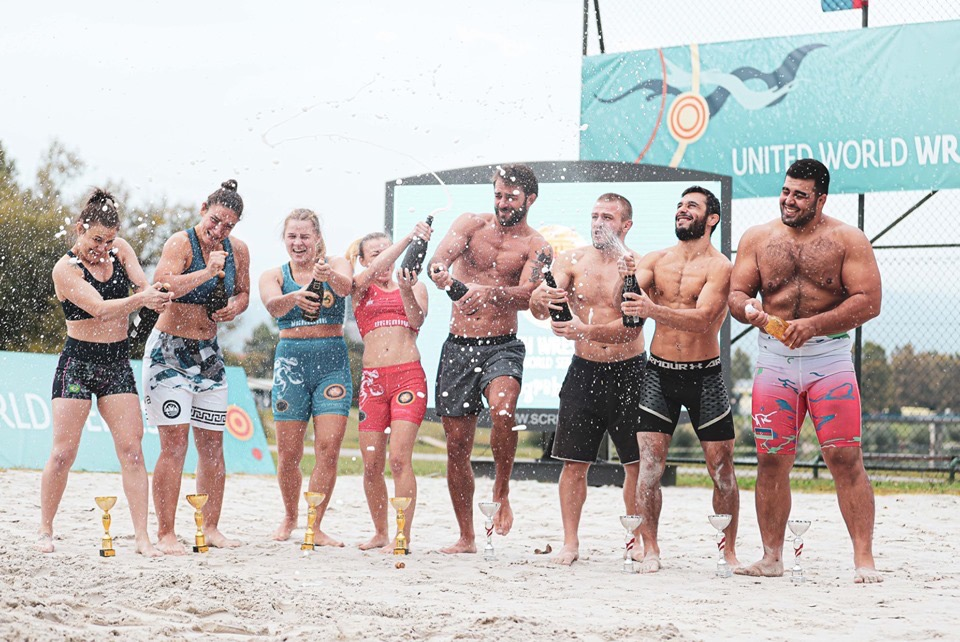
2019 World Champions; Camila Fama, Aikaterini Eirini Pitsiava, Anna Mazurkevych, Kateryna Mashkevych, Dato Marsagishvili, Davit Khutsishvili, Levan Kelekhasasgvili, Oyan Nazariani, Zagreb, Croatia.

World Beach Wrestling Championships is the annual world championship organized by United World Wrestling for the sport of beach wrestling.

== History ==
The first World Championships took place in 2006, alongside the resurrected FILA Sambo World Championships, in Antalya, Turkey. Only the Senior division was featured until 2010, and each age division has separate men and women divisions. There were initially only two weight classes for each of the gender divisions within the Senior division, lightweight and heavyweight. The number of weight classes expanded beginning in 2011, with the Senior men's division featuring four weight classes (70 kg, 80 kg, 90 kg, and heavyweight) and the Senior women's division featuring three weight classes (60 kg, 70 kg, and heavyweight).

Although not officially recognized by UWW as a World Championship, many nations recognize the beach wrestling competition of the World Wrestling Games to be the World Beach Wrestling Championship in 2007 (hosted in Antalya, Turkey) and 2008 (hosted in Durrës, Albania). The same recognition is generally not given to the 2009 World Wrestling Games (hosted in Šiauliai, Lithuania) as the Beach Wrestling World Championships made its officially sanctioned return. The World Wrestling Games also featured championships in Grappling and Sambo, with the three styles being collectively known as the "developing styles" at the time.

Beginning in 2019, the World Championships for the senior division will be determined via a point system during the Beach Wrestling World Series. The Beach Wrestling World Series features multiple international competitions, with each event awarding 15,000 CHF in prize money. The World Beach Wrestling Championships will remain as a singular event to determine the World Champion in the cadet and junior age divisions.

== Competitions ==
Year	Dates	City and host country	Competitions		
Year	Dates	City and host country	Seniors	Juniors	Cadets
2006	November 2	Antalya, Turkey	+	—	—
2009	July 28	Obzor, Bulgaria	+	—	—
2010	July 26–28	Budva, Montenegro	+	+	+
2011	July 16–18	(Georgia (country)) Batumi, Georgia	+	+	+
2012	August 27	Baku, Azerbaijan	—	—	+
2012	September 10	Pattaya, Thailand	+	+	—
2012	October 24	Budaörs, Hungary	+	—	—
2013	May 31	El-Jadida, Morocco	+	—	+
2014	July 4–6	Katerini, Greece	+	+	+
2015	June 13–15	Mangalia, Romania	+	+	+
2016	June 3–5	Fažana, Croatia	+	+	+
2017	October 13–15	Dalyan, Turkey	+	+	+
2018	October 6–7	Sarigerme, Turkey	+	+	+
2019	September 7–8	Zagreb, Croatia	+	+	+
2021	September 23–24	Constanța, Romania	—	+	+
2022	May 28 – September 4	5 events	+	—	—
2023	May 7 – October 15	5 events	+	—	—
2024	March 2 – October 13	5 events	+	—	—
2025	May 12 – October 19	5 events	+	—	—
Total	—	—	13	8	9

== Medallists (elite) ==
=== Men ===
==== 70kg ====
Year	Gold	Silver	Bronze
2011	Achiko Turmanidze (GEO)	Giorgi Lobjanidze (GEO)	Donovan DePatto (USA)
2012	Apostolos Taskoudis (GRE)	Hunor Szakolczi (HUN)	Vahid Sarlak (NED); Janos Sarosi (HUN)
2013	Apostolos Taskoudis (GRE)	Idris Hamadi (ROU)	Denis Siven (RUS)
2014	Toni Hinoveanu (ROU)	Apostolos Taskoudis (GRE)	Vasili Struckov (RUS)
2015	Mohammed Naderi (IRI)	Rustam Masharipov (RUS)	Apostolos Taskoudis (GRE); Gabriel Geroge Badea (ROU)
2016	Mohammed Naderi (IRI)	Apostolos Taskoudis (GRE)	Samet Ak (TUR); Denis Sivtsev (RUS)
2017	Semen Radulov (UKR)	Mohammed Naderi (IRI)	Veli Yantır (TUR); Aimar Andruse (EST)
2018	Konstantine Kabalashvili (GEO)	Semen Radulov (UKR)	Mehmet Emin Öğüt (TUR)
2019	Levan Kelekhsashvili (GEO)	Semen Radulov (UKR)	Michael Peters (USA)
2021	Levan Kelekhsashvili (GEO)	Yunus Coşkun (TUR)	Volodymyr Burukov (UKR)
2022	Levan Kelekhsashvili (GEO)	Ramiz Hasanov (AZE)	Yunus Coşkun (TUR)
2023	Yunus Coskun (TUR)	Oleksii Boruta (UKR)	Levan Kelekhsashvili (GEO)
2024	Oleksii Boruta (UKR)	Yunus Coskun (TUR)	Ivan Semenov (UKR)
2025	Levan Kelekhsashvili (GEO)	Oleksii Boruta (UKR)	Quentin Sticker (FRA)

==== 80kg ====
Year	Gold	Silver	Bronze
2011	Elnur Aliev (AZE)	Fatih Yerli (TUR)	Maksim Manukyan (ARM)
2012	Evgeni Pentorets (GRE)	Akos Woeller (HUN)	Harald Fjeldbu (NOR); Nikolai Slavov (UKR)
2013	Joakim Aardalen (NOR)	Mihaly Nagy (HUN)	Oleg Chernov (RUS)
2014	Leonid Spiridonov (RUS)	Mihaly Nagy (HUN)	Karl Oskar Frederiksson (SWE)
2015	Stanislav Stepanov (RUS)	Kyrillos Binembaoum (GRE)	Denis Sivtsev (RUS); Milad Mehdizadehchari (IRI)
2016	Pejman Heydari (IRI)	Igor Sofroneev (RUS)	Georgios Koulouhidis (GRE); Jacob Jeffrey Lee (USA)
2017	Sayed Safar Ghasemi (IRI)	Omid Hassan Tabar Jelodar (IRI)	Serkan Çavuşoğlu (TUR)
2018	Jakob Makarashvili (GEO)	Vasyl Mikhailov (UKR)	Jumber Kvelashvili (GEO)
2019	Davit Khutsishvili (GEO)	Georgios Koulouchidis (GRE)	Aleksandar Nikolic (SRB)
2021	Davit Khutsishvili (GEO)	Vasyl Mikhailov (UKR)	Vasile Madalin Minzala (ROU)
2022	Nika Kentchadze (GEO)	Omid Abdolali Kamaliaghdam (AZE)	Csaba Vida (HUN)
2023	Hugo Jose Fabien Cuenot (FRA)	Hossein Ali Abbaspourreikandeh (IRI)	Tyler Mackenzie Loethen (USA)
2024	Vasile Diacon (MDA)	Ramiz Hasanov (AZE)	Christos Christoforidis (GRE)
2025	Vusal Aliyev (AZE)	Vasyl Mykhailov (UKR)	Hugo Cuenot (FRA)

==== 85kg ====
Year	Gold	Silver	Bronze
2006	Hakkı Ceylan (TUR)	Abdullah Aycak (TUR)	Ray Dawney (USA); Gentian Geraj (ALB)
2009	Nikolai Stanchev (BUL)	Adem Akbulut (TUR)	Augusto Midana (GBS)
2010	Arpad Ritter (HUN)	Celal Dal (TUR)	Adem Akbulut (TUR)

==== 90kg ====
Year	Gold	Silver	Bronze
2011	Beka Chelidze (GEO)	Erkki Alak (EST)	Benjamin Sverdrup (NOR)
2012	Jozsef Adamecz (HUN)	Marko Jovanovic (SRB)	Laszlo Robotka (HUN); Tobias Kvammark (SWE)
2013	Vadim Semenov (RUS)	Malik Djakna (ROU)	Erkki Alak (EST)
2014	Yuri Starostin (RUS)	Dimitrios Papadopoulos (GRE)	Ilias Boukis (GRE)
2015	Seyed Mohammad Sadatitilehboni (IRI)	Myurgun Bugulov (RUS)	Andrei Frant (ROU); Dorin Constantin Pirvan (ROU)
2016	Seyed Mohammad Sadatitilehboni (IRI)	Grigorios Kriaridis (GRE)	Theodossios Pavlidis (GRE); Gavril Sleptsov (RUS)
2017	Muhammad Inam (PAK)	Pejman Fazlollah Tabar Naghrachi (IRI)	Theodossios Pavlidis (GRE); Savvinov Platon (RUS)
2018	Muhammad Inam (PAK)	Irakli Mtsituri (GEO)	Pedro Jacinto García Pérez (ESP)
2019	Dato Marsagishvili (GEO)	Christos Samartsidis (GRE)	Strahinja Demarnovic (SRB)
2021	Dato Marsagishvili (GEO)	Ibrahim Yusubov (AZE)	Oleksii Yakovchuk (UKR)
2022	Ibrahim Yusubov (AZE)	Davit Khutsishvili (GEO)	Mahmut Seyfi Özkaya (TUR)
2023	Ibrahim Yusubov (AZE)	Mahmut Seyfi Özkaya (TUR)	Hadi Bakhtiar Vafaeipour (IRI)
2024	Ibrahim Yusubov (AZE)	Traian Capatina (MDA)	Oleksii Yakovchuk (UKR)
2025	Ibrahim Yusubov (AZE)	Oleksii Yakovchuk (UKR)	Jabari Irons (USA)

==== +90kg ====
- +85kg: 2006, 2009, 2010
- +90kg: 2011–2022

Year	Gold	Silver	Bronze
2006	Ali Rıza Kaya (TUR)	Winard Yadal (IND)	Ray Dawney (USA); Gentian Geraj (ALB)
2009	Dimitar Kunchev (BUL)	Luka Eldari Kurtanidze (GEO)	Rodrigo Artilheiro Castro (BRA)
2010	Muhammet Sait Bingöl (TUR)	Vladimir Radosavljevic (MNE)	Carlos Dolmo (USA)
2011	Levan Berianidze (GEO)	Giorgi Sakandelidze (GEO)	Mehman Imamguliyev (AZE)
2012	Mihaly Szabo (HUN)	Christos Nyfadopoulos (GRE)	Daniel Bona (HUN); Shura Bayanmunkh (MGL)
2013	Stale Abelsen (NOR)	Maurice Abatam (ROU)	Hicham Hasbi (MAR)
2014	Vasile Vlad Caras (ROU)	Theofilos Ampatzis (GRE)	Ike Anthony Okoli (USA)
2015	Jaber Sadeghzadehnoukoulaei (IRI)	Egor Olar (MDA)	Aris Theodoridis (GRE); Marian Todorov (BUL)
2016	Jaber Sadeghzadehnoukoulaei (IRI)	Micheil Tsikovani (GRE)	Cengiz Zengin (TUR); Ünal Karaman (TUR)
2017	Pouya Rahmani (IRI)	Hakan Aydoğan (TUR)	Fedor Ivanov (RUS); Engin Dağlı (TUR)
2018	Baki Şahin (TUR)	Rares Daniel Chintoan (ROU)	İrfan Mete (TUR)
2019	Oyan Nazariani (AZE)	Ioannis Kargiotakis (GRE)	Mamuka Kordzaia (GEO)
2021	Oyan Nazariani (AZE)	Mamuka Kordzaia (GEO)	Vasile Vlad Caras (ROU)
2022	Fatih Yaşarlı (TUR)	Mamuka Kordzaia (GEO)	Vasile Vlad Caras (ROU)
2023	Fatih Yaşarlı (TUR)	Mamuka Kordzaia (GEO)	Oyan Nazariani (AZE)
2024	Mamuka Kordzaia (GEO)	Daniel Ligeti (HUN)	Kyle Robert Ferriter (USA)
2025	Mamuka Kordzaia (GEO)	Fatih Yaşarlı (TUR)	Oleksandr Veresiuk (UKR)

=== Women ===
==== 50kg ====
Year	Gold	Silver	Bronze
2018	Stefania Claudia Priceputu (ROU)	Sevil Alioğlu (TUR)	Maria Alexandra Cioclea (ROU)
2019	Kateryna Mashkevych (UKR)	Kristal Betanzo (USA)	Carmen Gomes (POR)
2021	Stefania Claudia Priceputu (ROU)	Emine Çataloğlu (TUR)	Tetina Profatilova (ROU)
2022	Stefania Claudia Priceputu (ROU)	Emine Çataloğlu (TUR)	Kumari Hanny (IND)
2023	Emine Çataloğlu (TUR)	Yuliia Zasulska (UKR)	Maia Abigail Cabrera (ARG)
2024	Ana Maria Pirvu (ROU)	Viktoriia Slobodeniuk (UKR)	Alevtyna Liashenko (UKR)
2025	Stefania Claudia Priceputu (ROU)	Claudia Soledad Cabrera (ARG)	Sabah Kaneb (MAR)

==== 60kg ====
Year	Gold	Silver	Bronze
2011	Miruyert Dynbaeva (KAZ)	Johanna Kikkas (EST)	Darina Abuladze (GEO)
2012	Miruyert Dynbaeva (KAZ)	Yulia Khamelis (KAZ)	Sriprapa Thokaew (THA)
2013	Miruyert Dynbaeva (KAZ)	Yulia Khamelis (KAZ)	Aliya I (KAZ)
2014	Maria Prevolaraki (GRE)	Miruyert Dynbaeva (KAZ)	Rykke Juel Bugge (NOR)
2015	Madalina Linguraru (ROU)	Mihaela Obregia (ROU)	Yulia Khamelis (KAZ)
2016	Aida Achmet (GRE)	Jelena Kastaneti (CRO)	Sara Trbulin (SLO)
2017	Francesca Indelicato (ITA)	Christina Demirkan (GRE)	Florine Schedler (AUT)
2018	Kriszta Tunde Incze (ITA)	Francesca Indelicato (ITA)	Jeannie Agnes Kessler (AUT)
2019	Camila Fama (BRA)	Valeriia Semonkina (UKR)	Isabel Rodrigues (POR)
2021	Anastasiya Kravchenko (UKR)	Francesca Indelicato (ITA)	Denisa Iuliana Fodor (ROU)
2022	Iryna Khariv (UKR)	Daria Medvetska (UKR)	Elena Simona Ionescu (ROU)
2023	Daria Medvetska (UKR)	Anastasiya Kravchenko (UKR)	Sofiia Kushnir (UKR)
2024	Anastasiya Kravchenko (UKR)	Sofiia Bordinskykh (UKR)	Sofiia Kushnir (UKR)
2025	Anastasiya Kravchenko (UKR)	Lydia Perez Tourino (ESP)	Sofiia Kushnir (UKR)

==== 70kg ====
Year	Gold	Silver	Bronze
2006	Aurora Fajardo Prieto (ESP)	Nadir Uğrun Perçin (TUR)	Leigh Joynes (USA); Margarita Monzes (ESP)
2009	Isabelle Sambou (SEN)	Taybe Yusein (BUL)	Maminirina Yudicael Rafaliharisolo (MAD)
2010	Mirjana Martinovic (MNE)	Valentina Gardasevic (MNE)	Andjela Krcmarevic (SRB)
2011	Olga Abakarova-Kalinina (KAZ)	Sholena Sharadze (GEO)	Poonm (IND)
2012	Olga Abakarova-Kalinina (KAZ)	Wilaiwan Thongkam (THA)	Charlotte Skauen (NOR)
2013	Olga Abakarova-Kalinina (KAZ)	Charlotte Skauen (NOR)	Christen Dierken (USA)
2014	Athina Giannousa (GRE)	Eirini Gavranidou (GRE)	Virginia Tsaknaki (GRE)
2015	Beatrice Oansea (ROU)	Roxana Andrei (ROU)	Laura Elena Gavriliuc (NOR)
2016	Agoro Papavasileiou (GRE)	Charlotte Skauen (NOR)	Elaine Albuquerque (BRA)
2017	Charlotte Skavner (NOR)	Cesilie Magnusen (NOR)	Meral Kaya (TUR)
2018	Adina Elena Popescu (ROU)	Charlotte Skauen (NOR)	Beatrice Oansea (ROU)
2019	Anna Mazurkevych (UKR)	Diana Betanzo (USA)	Sonia Pereira (POR)
2021	Alina Berezhna Stadnik Makhynia (UKR)	Agoro Papavasileiou (GRE)	Adina Iorela Irimia (ROU)
2022	Adina Iorela Irimia (ROU)	Yulia Kremezna Malyk (UKR)	Hatice Ece Tekin (TUR)
2023	Oksana Kukhta Herhel (UKR)	Adina Iorela Irimia (ROU)	Olena Nikitinska (UKR)
2024	Oksana Kukhta Herhel (UKR)	Astrid Paola Montero Chirinos (VEN)	Olena Nikitinska (UKR)
2025	Irina Ringaci (MDA)	Dimitra Androutsou (GRE)	Olena Nikitinska (UKR)

==== +70kg ====
Year	Gold	Silver	Bronze
2006	Dacil López (ESP)	Gurbet Koca (TUR)	Seda Bozkurt (TUR); Melek Yağan (TUR)
2009	Laure Ali Annabel (CMR)	Elina Vaseba (BUL)	Ralitza Ivanova (BUL)
2010	Una Svetlana Tuba (SRB)	Ivana Miletic (MNE)	Marija Drobnjak (MNE)
2011	Lia Givianidze (GEO)	Irina Leonidze (GEO)	
2012	Chusuwan Piyaporn (THA)	Epp Mae (EST)	Phattnachian Chidchamai (THA)
2014	Epp Mae (EST)	Isen Maria Moen Solheim (NOR)	Aikaterini Eirini Pitisiava (GRE)
2015	Elena Diana Frant Mudrag (ROU)	Ana Maria Stoian (ROU)	Cathrin Dahle Netskar (NOR); Aikaterini Eirini Pitisiava (GRE)
2016	Elena Diana Frant Mudrag (ROU)	Aikaterini Eirini Pitisiava (GRE)	Stefania Zacheila (GRE)
2017	Cathrine Frilseth (NOR)	Pesnille Rojar (NOR)	Aikaterini Eirini Pitisiava (GRE)
2018	Catalina Axente (ROU)	Aikaterini Eirini Pitisiava (GRE)	Diana Elena Vlasceanu (ROU)
2019	Aikaterini Eirini Pitisiava (GRE)	Irina Pasichnyk (UKR)	Not awarded
2021	Catalina Axente (ROU)	Irina Pasichnyk (UKR)	Enrica Rinaldi (ITA)
2022	Catalina Axente (ROU)	Liudmyla Pavlovets Tychyna (UKR)	Stefania Zacheila (GRE)
2023	Eliane Rose Bommarito (USA)	Liudmyla Pavlovets Tychyna (UKR)	Catalina Axente (ROU)
2024	Eliane Rose Bommarito (USA)	Iryna Pasichnyk (UKR)	Catalina Axente (ROU)
2025	Eliane Rose Bommarito (USA)	Iryna Pasichnyk (UKR)	Stefania Zacheila (GRE)

== See also ==
- Beach Wrestling
