= Wahid =

Wahid or Waheed is an Arabic masculine given name, meaning "One", "Absolute One". Its feminine form is Wahida. Al-Wahid is one of the 99 names of Allah.

== Given name ==
- Waheed Akhtar (1934–1996), Urdu poet
- Wahid al-Balous (1965–2015), Syrian Druze cleric
- Waheed Alli, Baron Alli (born 1964), British multimillionaire media entrepreneur and politician
- Waheed Arian (born 1983), British doctor and radiologist, born in Afghanistan
- Mohamed Waheed Hassan (born 1953), political figure
- Wahid Hasyim (1914–1953), first Minister of Religious Affairs, Indonesia
- Waheed Murad (1938–1983), producer, writer, and protagonist of many film musicals
- Waheed Muzdha (1953–2019), Afghan political analyst, writer and a peace activist
- Wahid Omar (born 1978), Afghan politician
- Waheed Qureshi (1925–2009), Pakistani linguist, literary critic, educationalist and scholar
- Wahid Baksh Sial Rabbani (1910–1995), saint in the Chishti order of Sufis
- Wahid Supriyadi (born 1959), Indonesian diplomat
- Wahid Ullah Zaid (born 1944), Afghan wrestler

== Surname ==
- Abdul Wahid (disambiguation), several people
- Abdurrahman Wahid (1940–2009), 4th President of Indonesia
- Habib Wahid (born 1979), Bangladeshi composer and musician
- Hidayat Nur Wahid (born 1960), leader of Indonesia's Constitutional Assembly
- Naushad Waheed (born 1962), Maldivian cartoonist and painter
- Nayyirah Waheed, American poet
- Rezia Wahid (born 1975), British textile artist
- Yenny Wahid (born 1974), Indonesian Islamic activist and politician
- Zaha Waheed, Maldivian politician

== See also ==
- Waĥeed, a character in the 1975 film A Girl Named Mahmoud
- Wahid (horse), New Zealand Derby winning racehorse
- Wahid, Phagwara, a village in Phagwara Tehsil, Kapurthala district, Punjab, India
- The Wahid Institute, an Indonesian research center on Islam
- Vahid, Bosnian, Turkish and Persian variant
