= 2019 Vehbi Emre & Hamit Kaplan Tournament =

2019 wrestling event

- Host city: Turkey, Istanbul
- Dates: 1–3 February
- Stadium: Cebeci Sports Complex

The 37th Vehbi Emre & Hamit Kaplan Tournament 2019, was a wrestling event held in Istanbul, Turkey between 1 and 3 February 2019.

This international tournament includes competition men's Greco-Roman wrestling. This ranking tournament was held in honor of the Olympic Champion, Hamit Kaplan and Turkish Wrestler and manager Vehbi Emre.

== Medal overview ==
=== Medal table ===
Rank	Nation	Gold	Silver	Bronze	Total
1	Iran	4	0	3	7
2	Turkey	3	6	9	18
3	Azerbaijan	1	2	2	5
4	Georgia	1	1	4	6
5	Belarus	1	1	2	4
Totals (5 entries)		10	10	20	40

=== Greco-Roman ===
Event	Gold	Silver	Bronze
55 kg	(Turkey) Şerif Kılıç	(Turkey) Doğuş Ayazcı	(Georgia (country)) Zurab Matcharashvili
55 kg	(Turkey) Şerif Kılıç	(Turkey) Doğuş Ayazcı	(Iran) Pouya Nasserpour
60 kg	(Azerbaijan) Murad Mammadov	(Turkey) Kerem Kamal	(Iran) Mehdi Mohsennejad
60 kg	(Azerbaijan) Murad Mammadov	(Turkey) Kerem Kamal	(Turkey) Ahmet Uyar
63 kg	(Georgia (country)) Levani Kavjaradze	(Azerbaijan) Taleh Mammadov	(Turkey) Abdurrahman Altan
63 kg	(Georgia (country)) Levani Kavjaradze	(Azerbaijan) Taleh Mammadov	(Turkey) Onur Atalay
67 kg	(Iran) Hamed Tab	(Turkey) Hacı Karakuş	(Turkey) Mustafa Şahin
67 kg	(Iran) Hamed Tab	(Turkey) Hacı Karakuş	(Georgia (country)) Sachino Davitaia
72 kg	(Iran) Amin Kavianinejad	(Turkey) Cengiz Arslan	(Turkey) Yunus Özel
72 kg	(Iran) Amin Kavianinejad	(Turkey) Cengiz Arslan	(Turkey) Selçuk Can
77 kg	(Turkey) Fatih Cengiz	(Georgia (country)) Demur Kavtaradze	(Turkey) Yunus Emre Başar
77 kg	(Turkey) Fatih Cengiz	(Georgia (country)) Demur Kavtaradze	(Turkey) Furkan Bayrak
82 kg	(Belarus) Viktar Sasunouski	(Turkey) Burhan Akbudak	(Azerbaijan) Rafig Huseynov
82 kg	(Belarus) Viktar Sasunouski	(Turkey) Burhan Akbudak	(Iran) Saeid Abdevali
87 kg	(Iran) Mohammad Hadi Saravi	(Turkey) Ali Cengiz	(Georgia (country)) Shalva Khachidze
87 kg	(Iran) Mohammad Hadi Saravi	(Turkey) Ali Cengiz	(Belarus) Radzik Kuliyeu
97 kg	(Turkey) Cenk İldem	(Belarus) Siarhei Staradub	(Georgia (country)) Giorgi Melia
97 kg	(Turkey) Cenk İldem	(Belarus) Siarhei Staradub	(Azerbaijan) Orkhan Nuriyev
130 kg	(Iran) Amir Ghasemi Monjazi	(Azerbaijan) Oyan Nazariani	(Turkey) Burak Çakırca
130 kg	(Iran) Amir Ghasemi Monjazi	(Azerbaijan) Oyan Nazariani	(Belarus) Kiryl Hryshchanka

== Participating nations ==
146 competitors from 11 nations participated.

- Azerbaijan (11)
- Belarus (12)
- Bulgaria (6)
- Finland (1)
- Georgia (15)
- Greece (1)
- Iran (10)
- Moldova (7)
- Palestine (1)
- Tajikistan (1)
- Turkey (81)
