= Vahide =

Vahide is a feminine given name and a feminine derivative of the Persian origin name Vahid. People with the name include:

- Vahide Aydın (born 1968), Austrian-Turkish politician and social worker
- Vahideh Isari (born 1986), Iranian football player
- Vahide Perçin (born 1965), Turkish actress
- Vahideh Taleghani (born c. 1963), Iranian politician

== Pen name ==
- Emine Vahide, pen name of Turkish writer Emine Semiye Önasya
