= Oyan Nazariani =

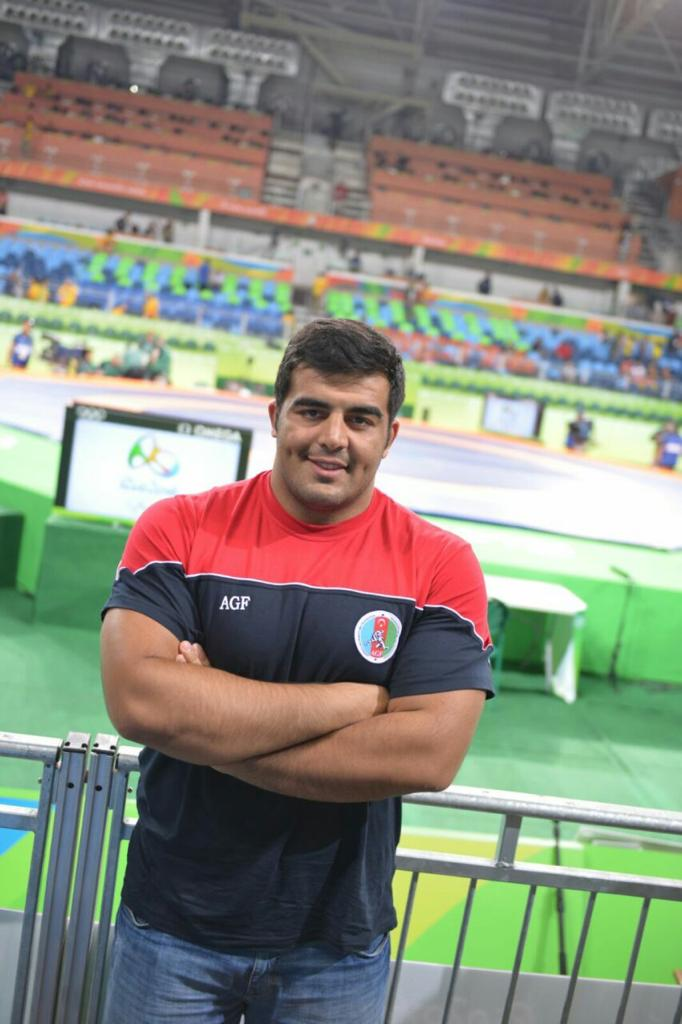

Personal information
- Full name: Oyan Nazariani
- Born: August 5, 1994 (age 31) Urmia, Iran
- Height: 185 cm (6 ft 1 in)
- Weight: 130 kg (287 lb)

Sport
- Country: Azerbaijan
- Style: Freestyle wrestling Greco-Roman; Beach wrestling
Medal record
Representing Azerbaijan
Wrestling World Cup
Silver medal – second place	2017 Abadan	130 kg
World Beach Wrestling Championship
Gold medal – first place	2019 Zagreb	+90
Silver medal – second place	2021 Constanța	+90
ANOC World Beach Games
Bronze medal – third place	2019 Doha	+90 kg
Open Cup of European Nations
Silver medal – second place	2015 Moscow	130 kg
Bronze medal – third place	2016 Moscow	130 kg
Golden Grand Prix
Gold medal – first place	2016 Baku	130
Azerbaijani Championship
Gold medal – first place	2015 Baku	130
Gold medal – first place	2016 Baku	130
Gold medal – first place	2017 Baku	130
Gold medal – first place	2018 Baku	130
Gold medal – first place	2019 Baku	130

Oyan Nazariani (Azerbaijani: Oyan Nəzəriani, Azerbaijani: اویان نظریانی) is an Azerbaijani Beach wrestling and Greco-Roman wrestler born in Urmia. He has been playing for the Azerbaijani national wrestling team since 2014. He won a gold medal at the international Golden Grand Prix tournament in Baku in 2016, and a silver medal at the 2017 Greco-Roman Wrestling World Cup in Abadan, Iran. He is a five-time national champion. In 2019, he was awarded a gold medal at the World Beach Wrestling Championship in Zagreb, Croatia.

Since 2020, he is the head coach of the Azerbaijani beach wrestling team. In 2024, he was elected as a coach-instructor for the United World Wrestling, and in 2025, he became a member of the Beach Wrestling Committee.

== Personal life and education ==
Oyan Nazariani was born in 1994 in the city of Urmia, Iran. After graduating from high school in Urmia, he studied law at Mahabad Azad University.

== Career ==
He has been wrestling since 2003. In 2011, he took third place in the Iranian youth championship. After that, he was invited to the Iranian wrestling team. In 2013, he won a bronze medal as a member of the Iranian national team at the Salvation Tournament in Kahramanmaras, Turkey. He moved to Azerbaijan in 2014 and began to represent Azerbaijan in tournaments. In 2014, he won a gold medal at the national championship among youth in Azerbaijan, a silver medal at the international tournament for the AWF Cup, a gold medal at the international tournament for the Nakhchivan Cup, and a silver medal at the international tournament in Dagestan. Later that year, he competed at the European Junior Wrestling Championships in Katowice, Poland, and at the World Junior Wrestling Championships in Zagreb, Croatia. In 2015, he participated in the U-23 European Wrestling Championship in Walbrzych, Poland, won a silver medal at the European Wrestling Cup in Moscow, Russia, and a gold medal at the Azerbaijani Championship. In 2016, he finished third in the European Nations Cup and first in the Golden Grand Prix international tournament. He won a silver medal at the 2017 Greco-Roman Wrestling World Cup in Abadan, Iran. In 2015, 2016, 2017, and 2018, he became the champion of Azerbaijan in the weight category of 130 kg. In February 2019, he took second place in the Vehbi Emre and Hamit Kaplan Memorial Tournament in Istanbul, Turkey, and won a silver medal. In September 2019, Oyan Nazariani won the world championship cup in the finals of the Beach Wrestling World Series in Zagreb, Croatia.

=== Coaching career ===
On September 21, 2020, he was appointed head coach of the Azerbaijani beach wrestling team. On September 11, 2021, the European Junior Beach Wrestling Championship was held in Katerini, Greece. Under the leadership of Oyan Nazariani, each of the four athletes representing Azerbaijan at the championship was awarded various medals. They won a total of 2 gold, 1 silver and 1 bronze medal. The national team of Azerbaijan took the third place in the team event among juniors in this competition.

On September 26, 2021, the World Junior Beach Wrestling Championship was held in Constanța, Romania. Each of the four athletes representing Azerbaijan at the championship, led by Oyan Nazariani, was awarded various medals. They won a total of 2 gold and 2 silver medals. Among juniors, they were awarded third place in the team standings.

Oyan Nazariani and Ibrahim Yusubov each won silver medals at the World Beach Wrestling Championship among adults held in Constanța, Romania on September 25–26, 2021.

In 2024, he was elected as a coach-instructor for the United World Wrestling.

In 2025, he became a member of the Beach Wrestling Committee.

== Major results ==
Yarış	Azerbaijan						
Yarış	2014	2015	2016	2017	2018	2019	2021
Wrestling World Cup			6	2			
Open Cup of European Nations		2	3				
Golden Grand Prix			1				
World Beach Wrestling Championship						1	2
Senior U23 World Championships				8			
U23 European Championship		7	10	12			
World Junior Championships	8						
European Junior Championships	5						
2019 Vehbi Emre & Hamit Kaplan Tournament						2	
Azerbaijani Championship	3	1	1	1	1	1	
Azerbaijan Wrestling Federation Cup	2						
Nakhchivan Cup	1						
