= Vahid Aziz =

Azerbaijani poet (1945)

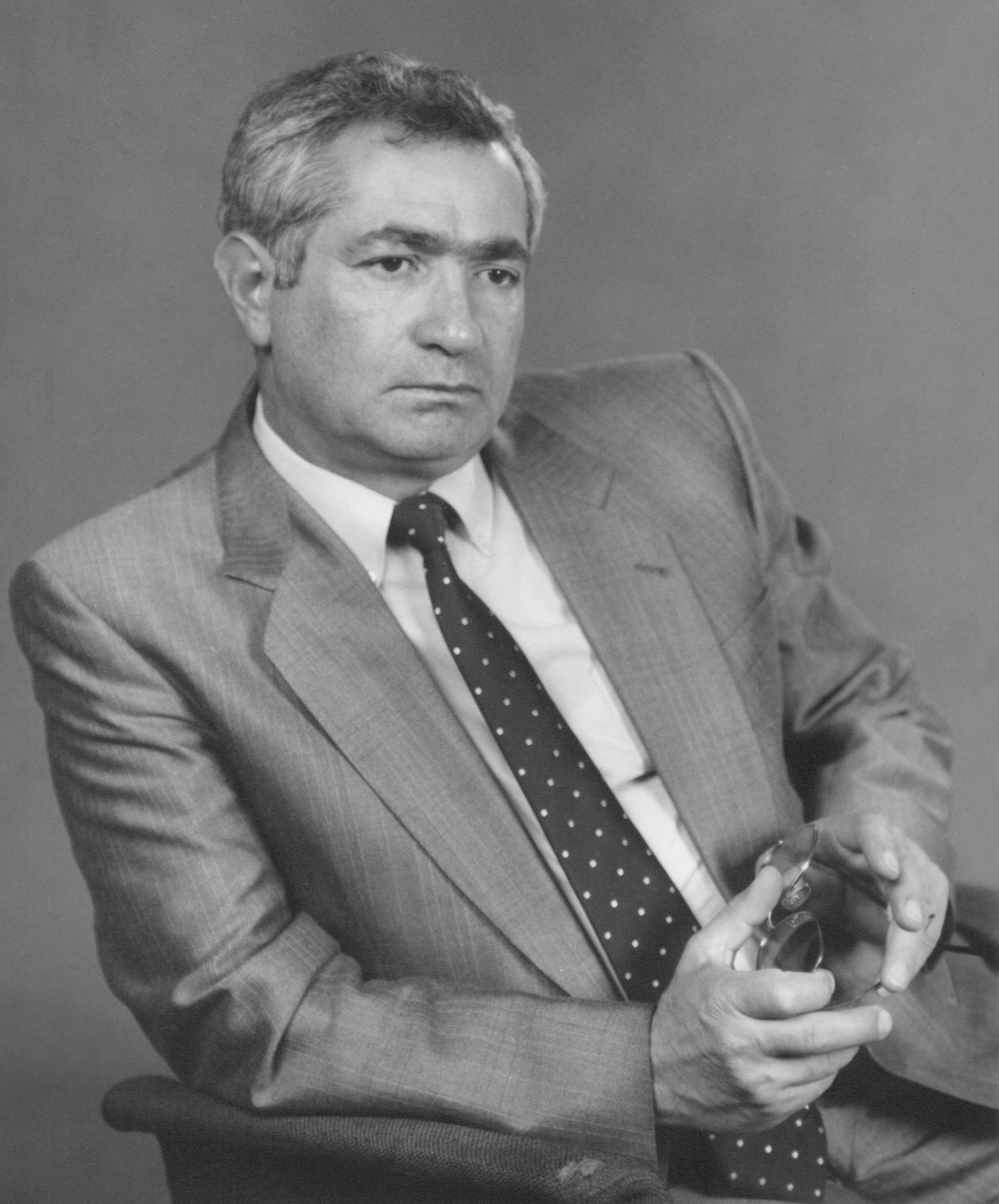
- Vahid Aziz in 1993
- Born: November 23, 1945 (age 80); Herher, Vayots Dzor, Armenia SSR, Soviet Union
- Citizenship: Azerbaijan
- Education: Azerbaijan Technical University
- Occupations: poet, translator
- Writing career
- Notable work: Bayatılar

Vahid Aziz oghlu Jafarov (Azerbaijani: Vahid Əziz oğlu Cəfərov, IPA: [vɑˈhid æˈziz oɣˈlu dʒæˈfæɾov]; born November 23, 1945) is an Azerbaijani poet, translator, and publicist. He is member to the Union of Azerbaijani Writers and Union of Azerbaijani Journalists.

== Biography ==
Vahid was born in Herher village in Armenia SSR.

He started his career in 1967 with his first poem published in the "Literature and Art" newspaper. Vahid has more than 200 publications. More than 40 songs were composed for his poems.

He is the author of the famous "Bayatılar" song by Brilliant Dadashova. The song has been covered, interpolated and sampled in songs by many artists.

== Books ==
- I see the wind Mən küləyi görürəm (1969)
- The window with Moon Aylı pəncərə (1974)
- Spring of the years İllərin baharı (1980)
- Shadow of my hands Əllərimin kölgəsi (1985)
- Cannot bear Dözmək olmur (1997)
- Shattered years Param-parça illər (2021)

== Awards ==
- Vahid Aziz awarded with the title of People's Poet in 2019.
- In 2019, he was awarded with the memorial emblem of "Nizami Ganjavi 880"

== See also ==
- Eldar Mansurov
