= Beach wrestling =

Type of wrestling

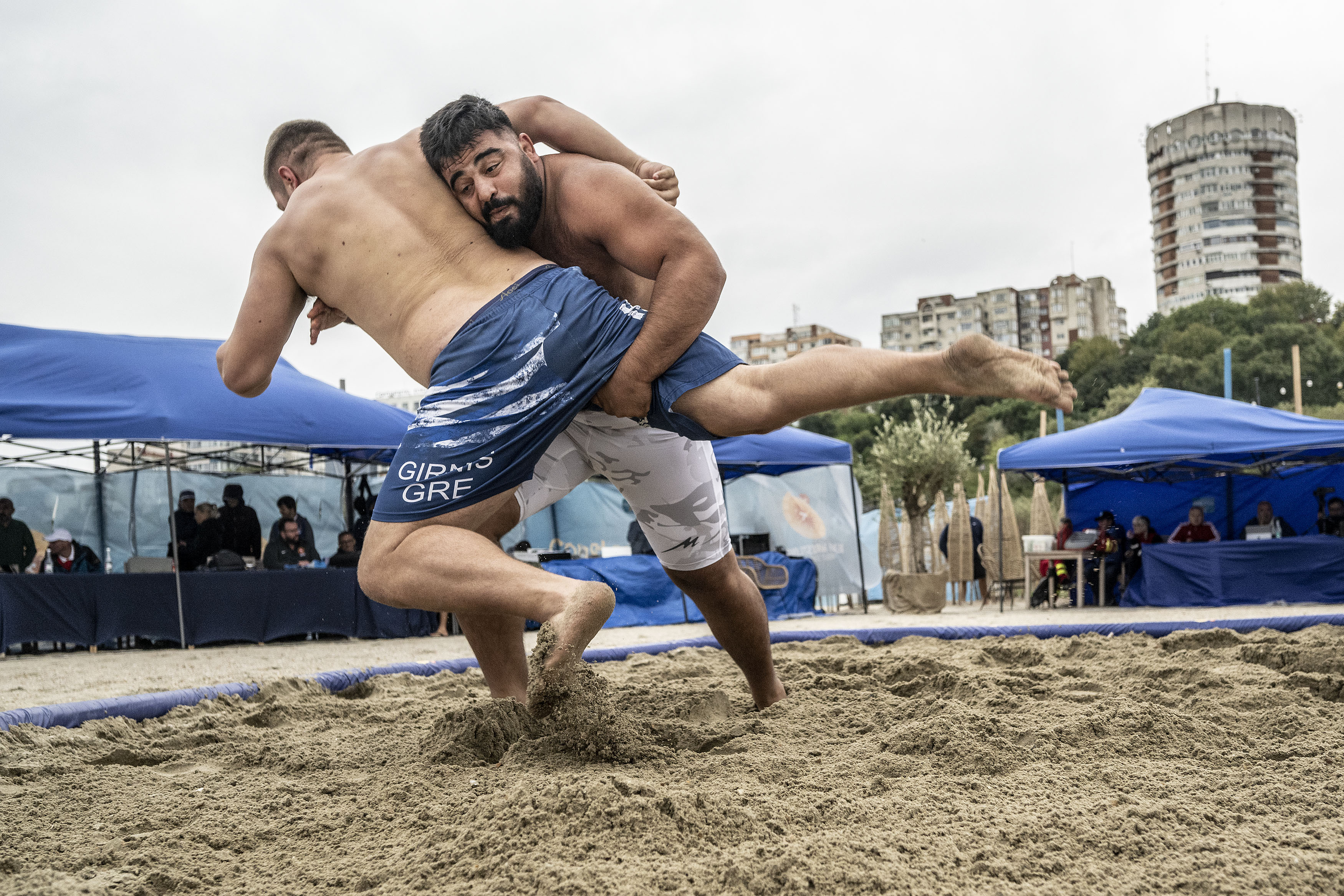
- 2022 World Series, the match between Oyan Nazariani and Rafail Gkirnis; Constanta, Romania

Beach wrestling is a type of wrestling that is specifically played on a beach or in a similar sandy environment, and that has been officially held since 2005.

== History ==
First time in 2004, during the International United Wrestling Federation (FILA), beach wrestling was registered as a type of wrestling. Beach wrestling is a sport type in which both men and women can participate. Athletes compete in an inner sand-filled circle with a diameter of 7 meters. Unlike regular wrestling, athletes participating in this type of wrestling wear swimsuits, not wrestling clothes. They can also use spandex or sports shorts.

In 2015, the International Federation of United Wrestling (FILA) amended the international rules. Under the new rules, wrestlers can score by knocking an opponent down, out of the ring, or on their back. In addition to the annual World Beach Wrestling Championships, beach wrestling has featured in the Youth Olympic Games, Asian Games, Mediterranean Games and the 2019 World Beach Games. The World Beach Wrestling Championship has been held in series for the first time since 2019.

== About ==
All competitions in beach wrestling that approved by the World Wrestling Federation are held in a circle with a diameter of 7 meters, surrounded by an 8–10 cm of dark color tape that differs from the sand, and not having any metal parts. The competition area should be filled with at least 30 cm of sand layer.

== Rules ==
The competition lasts 3 minutes only in the standing position and without a break. Using legs are allowed for scoring against the opponent wrestler. The attacking wrestler can instantly put one knee down and perform any action. However, if that act is unsuccessful, i.e. no points are scored, then 1 point is given to the opponent wrestler. If one of the wrestlers scores 3 or more points, the match ends earlier. If the match ends with a score of 1:1 or 2:2, the wrestler who scored the last point is declared the winner. If the match ends 0:0, the wrestler with lower weight is declared the winner. If both wrestlers have the same weight, the athlete with the lower number in the sortition is declared the winner. Each wrestler can use the medical services for a maximum of 2 minutes during the match. Athletes that compete in the respective round should be on the competition field for a maximum of 2 minutes.

=== Points for actions and holds ===
Actions in beach wrestling are valued with 1 and 3 points.

To be valued with 1 point:

- touching any part of the body (head, knees, abdomen) without taking into account the hands on the competition field;
- removing from the wrestling zone (it is enough to remove the head and chest);
- illegal action and apparent passivity.

To be valued with 3 points:

- the position sweeping curve in the air of the opponent during the action performed while standing.

=== Weight ===
The weighing process is held 2 hours before the start of the competition. In beach wrestling, there are weight categories for 3 age groups.

== See also ==
- Classic Wrestling
- Scholastic wrestling
- Collegiate wrestling
