= 2019 World Beach Wrestling Championships =

International beach wrestling competition

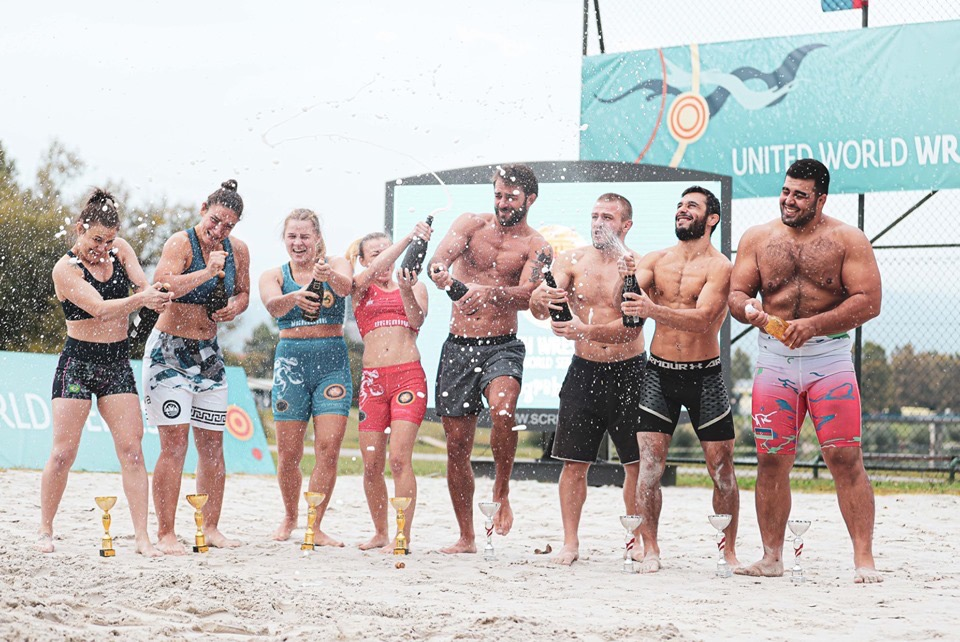
2019 World Champions; Camila Fama, Aikaterini Eirini Pitsiava, Anna Mazurkevych, Kateryna Mashkevych, Dato Marsagishvili, Davit Khutsishvili, Levan Kelekhasasgvili, Oyan Nazariani, Zagreb, Croatia.

The 2019 World Beach Wrestling Championships was held in Zagreb, Croatia from 7 to 8 September 2019.

== Medal table ==
Rank	Nation	Gold	Silver	Bronze	Total
1	Georgia (GEO)	3	0	1	4
2	Ukraine (UKR)	2	3	0	5
3	Greece (GRE)	1	3	0	4
4	Azerbaijan (AZE)	1	0	0	1
4	Brazil (BRA)	1	0	0	1
6	United States (USA)	0	2	1	3
7	Portugal (POR)	0	0	3	3
8	Serbia (SRB)	0	0	2	2
Totals (8 entries)		8	8	7	23

== Results ==
=== Men ===
Event	Gold	Silver	Bronze
70 kg	(Georgia (country)) Levan Kelekhsashvili	(Ukraine) Semyon Radulov	(United States) Michael Peters
80 kg	(Georgia (country)) Davit Khutsishvili	(Greece) Georgios Koulouchidis	(Serbia) Aleksandar Nikolic
90 kg	(Georgia (country)) Dato Marsagishvili	(Greece) Christos Samartsidis	(Serbia) Strahinja Dermanovic
90+ kg	(Azerbaijan) Oyan Nazariani	(Greece) Ioannis Kargiotakis	(Georgia (country)) Mamuka Kordzaia

=== Women ===
Event	Gold	Silver	Bronze
50 kg	(Ukraine) Kateryna Mashkevych	(United States) Kristal Betanzo	(Portugal) Carmen Gomes
60 kg	(Brazil) Camila Fama	(Ukraine) Valeriia Semonkina	(Portugal) Isabel Rodrigues
70 kg	(Ukraine) Anna Mazurkevych	(United States) Diana Betanzo	(Portugal) Sonia Pereira
70+ kg	(Greece) Aikaterini Pitsiava	(Ukraine) Iryna Pasichnyk	Not awarded
