= Pishkinid dynasty =

Dynasty in northwestern Iran from 1155 to 1231

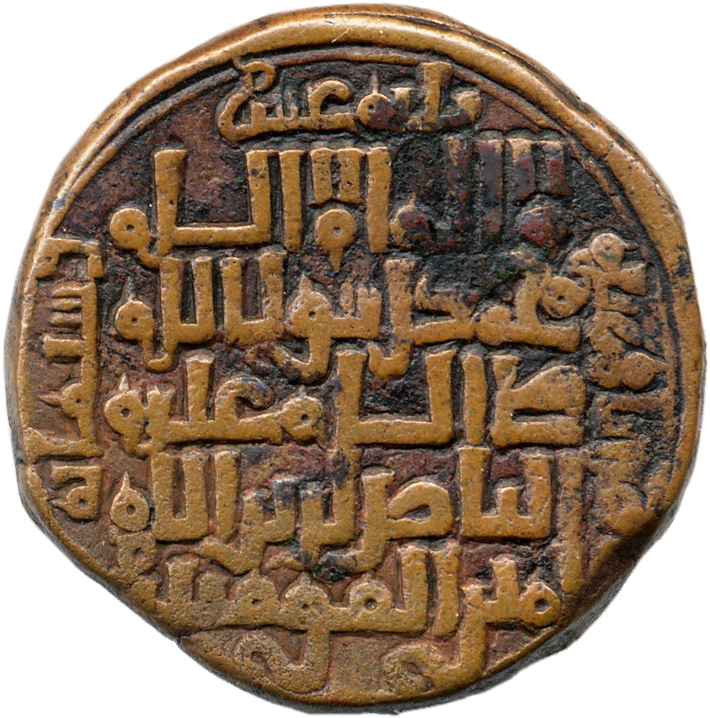
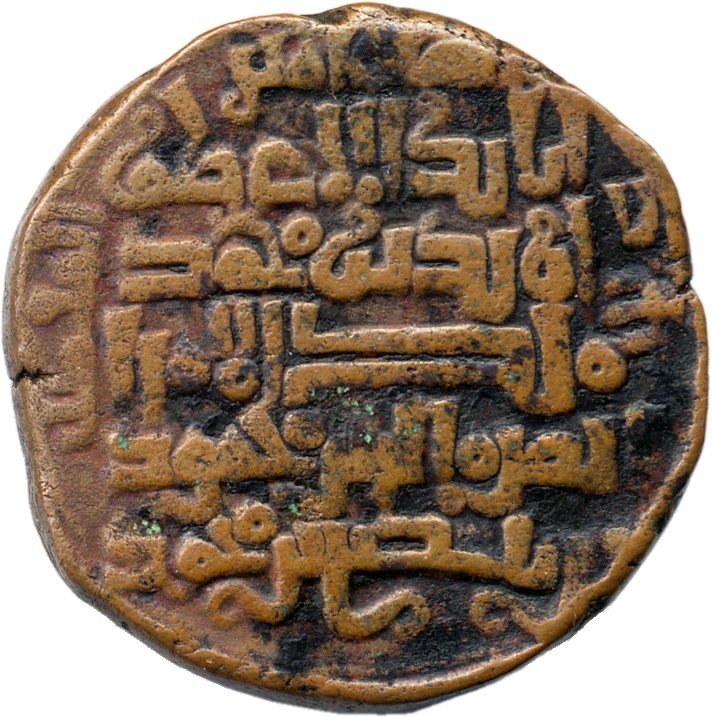
Coin of Mahmud ibn Pishkin (c. 1212–1226), citing the Eldiguzid ruler (atabeg) Muzaffar al-Din Uzbek as overlord. Dated 1216/7 (left = obverse; right = reverse)

The Pishteginids (Bishkinids, Pishkinids) were a dynasty of maliks in Iran which ruled, from 1155 to 1231, Ahar and its adjacent district as vassals to the Shaddadids of Arran. The family descended from a Georgian nobleman captured by the Seljuqid sultan Alp Arslan during his 1068 expedition against Georgia and brought as a prisoner to Iran. The dynasty fell to the Khwarezmian conquests between 1225 and 1231. The last two dynasts of the family issued their own coins, placing their names next to those of the Caliph and Eldiguzid atabeg. The name of Meshkinshahr, a town east of Ahar, seems to have been derived from the Pishkinid dynasty.
