= Vahid, Iran =

Vahid وحيد
- Village
- Location within Iran
- Coordinates: 31°25′25″N 49°06′42″E
- Country: Iran
- Province: Khuzestan
- County: Bavi
- Bakhsh: Veys
- Rural District: Veys

Population (2006)
  - Total: 113
- Time zone: UTC+3:30 (IRST)
  - Summer (DST): UTC+4:30 (IRDT)

Vahid (Persian: وحيد, also Romanized as Vaḩīd, Vohayyad, Voḩayyed, and Voḩeyyed) is a village in Veys Rural District, Veys District, Bavi County, Khuzestan Province, Iran. At the 2006 census, its population was 113, in 11 families.
