= Sarlak, Republic of Bashkortostan =

Sarlak Сарлак
- Village
- Location within Bashkortostan Location within Russia
- Coordinates: 53°00′N 55°55′E
- Country: Russia
- Region: Bashkortostan
- District: Meleuzovsky District
- Time zone: UTC+5:00

Sarlak (Russian: Сарлак; Bashkir: Сарлаҡ, Sarlaq) is a rural locality (a village) in Meleuzovsky Selsoviet, Meleuzovsky District, Bashkortostan, Russia. The population was 334 as of 2010. There are 6 streets.

== Geography ==
Sarlak is located 7 km north of Meleuz (the district's administrative centre) by road. Meleuz is the nearest rural locality.
