= Wahida Prism Khan =

Indian naval doctor (b. 1972)

Defence officer wahida
- Born: October 12, 1972 (age 53); Rajouri, Jammu & Kashmir India
- Citizenship: Indian
- Occupation: Naval surgeon
- Employer: Indian Navy

Wahida Prism Khan (born 1972) is an Indian naval surgeon. She was the first woman to command the annual parade at the Armed Forces Medical College, Pune in 2006. She was the first woman from Jammu and Kashmir to join the Indian Navy.

== Early life ==
Khan was born in Thanamandi, Rajouri to teachers Gulzar Ahmed and Hajara Kaser. Khan is one of five siblings. Her elder sister Jabeen Lone is Deputy Superintendent in J&K Police. Khan's father was killed by militants at work in his school while teaching the children in 2001.

Khan finished her schooling at Thanamandi in Rajouri. She did her intermediate from the Government Girls School Rajouri. She pursued her MBBS from Government Medical College, Jammu. Among her hobbies, Khan was interested in riding a motorcycles and climbing mountains. She was raised as a strong and independent thinker like her other siblings. Their way of life was not appreciated at that time as the people were not that open minded and progressive. The family often had to take the brunt from the town and they had to make lot of adjustments, like moving out of town a couple of times. But this did not discourage the parents who continued to support her and family.

== Career ==
Khan joined Armed Forces Medical College after finishing her MBBS to please her father. In 1997, Khan took an orientation training course at the Officer's Training School at Lucknow and was commissioned in the Navy in 1997.

Khan served the Indian Navy as Surgeon Captain. In 2016, Khan was appointed as Additional Ship Safety Officer (ASSO) at Naval Ship Angre under Headquarter Western Naval Command. Khan served aboard naval ship INS Amba for 19 months and aims to become the first woman to work in submarines.

== Personal life ==
Khan married pathologist Major M. F. Khan, a former Short Service Commissioned (SSC) Officer. She attributes her success to her husband. In 2007, the National Council of Education Research and Trainings (NCERT) incorporated her career journey and story in a chapter for Class IV students.
