= Dobranotch =

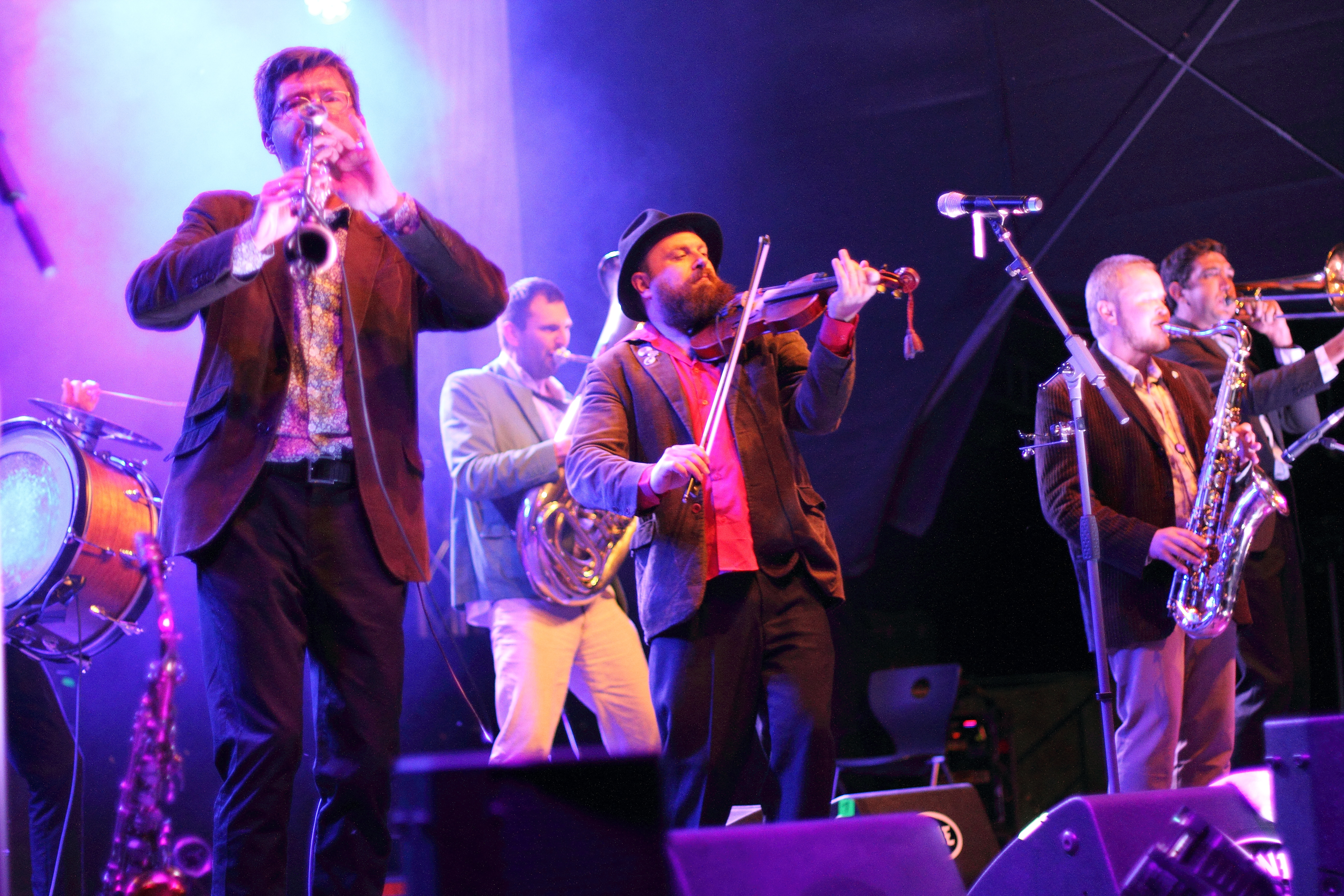
- Dobranotch performing at the Rudolstadt-Festival in 2016

Background information
- Genres: Klezmer, Balkan music, Russian folk music
- Labels: CPL-Music
- Website: dobranotch.com

Dobranotch (Russian: Добраночь) is a folk music ensemble based in Germany, originally from Saint Petersburg, Russia. Founded in Nantes, France in 1997, the group plays Klezmer, Russian folk music, Balkan music, Moldovan music, and a mix of other genres.

== History ==
Dobranotch was founded in Nantes, France in 1997 by three folk musicians from Saint Petersburg: Mitia Khramtsov, Oleg Drobinsky, and Stas Zubtsov. These musicians had been living in France at that time, busking and playing Jewish and Celtic music. The group's name, which means "good night" in Russian, is also a reference to a tune genre in Klezmer music which marked the end of the day's events in a traditional Eastern European Jewish wedding.

Because of the eclectic personal and musical backgrounds of the group's members, their repertoire came to include a wide variety of genres including not only Klezmer and Balkan music, but Russian-language Jewish songs from Odesa, Middle Eastern music, and others. The group became an important part of the renewed popularity of Klezmer music in Russia in the 1990s, notable for their use of traditional acoustic instruments rather than electronic music.

The group has performed at a number of festivals over the years, including the Fusion Festival and Jewish Culture Festival Krakow, KlezKanada, Ashkenaz, the Rudolstadt-Festival, the Sziget Festival. The group has won various awards, including the Eiserner Eversteiner audience favorite award in 2017, the Russian World Music Award in 2018, and the German Record Critics Award for best third quarter release in 2019.

Following the 2022 Russian invasion of Ukraine members of the group left Russia and have been living abroad due to their opposition to the invasion.

== Discography ==
- Musique Russe & Yiddish (OTZ, 1999)
- Чтоб Душа Развернулась... (Let the Soul Unfold, Kailas Records, 2002)
- Gagarin Chochek (Orange World Records, 2005)
- In The East The Sun Decides All (Orange World Records, 2010)
- Bazardüzü (no label, 2012)
- Виноград (Vinograd, no label, 2014)
- Махорка (Makhorka, CPL-Music, 2017)
- 20 Years (CPL-Music, 2018)
- Merčedes Colo (CPL-Music, 2019)
- Цимес (Tsimes, no label, 2019)
- Zay Freylekh (CPL-Music, 2022)
- Vander Ikh Mir Lustik (CPL-Music, 2024)
