= Vahid Evazzadeh =

Theatre director, writer, dramaturge and filmmaker

Vahid Evazzadeh is a theatre director, writer, dramaturge and filmmaker based in Denmark and United Kingdom.

== Performances ==
=== As director ===
- 2018 – Uncle Fool with The Counter Institute, co-produced by Sydhavn Teater
- 2015 – The Maids in Istanbul
- 2014 – The Maids in Beijing
- 2008–12 – HamletZar at Odin Teatret, Dance Base, Barbican Centre, Pavilion Dance South West etc.
- 2011 – inferno
- 2009 – Truth is Fragmented
- 2000 – Mama Godzilla

=== As dramaturge ===
- 2019 – Walk-Man with DON GNU Physical Theater
- 2007 – @Work: No Title with TeaterKunst

== Publication ==
=== Short stories ===
- 2018 – Six bullet holes in VisAvis No. 13
- 2016 – Not Tonight in Friktion Magazin
- 2014 – At Sidde og Læse I Min Blodige Bog Friktion Magazin

=== Film criticism ===
- 2005 – Thelma & Louise in Filmmagasinet Ekko

== Interviews ==
=== On Performing Arts ===
- 2019 – Master the Craft First Interview by Tonia Stavrinou
- 2019 – Η τέχνη θέλει ειλικρινείς προθέσεις
- 2015 – In Conversation with Vahid Evazzadeh By Claire Zerhouni for Yabangee
- 2009 – Theater is the Path to Freedom interview with Sue Balint first published in the Wheel Me Out magazine

=== On Culture, Politics and Society ===
- 2019 – On The Role of Art in society video interview by Marijana Rimanic for Reshape research project
- 2014 – Turning Margin into Center interview by Rita Júlia Sebestyén in The Migrationist
