= Vahid Najafi Nakhjevanlou =

Iranian writer and environmental activist

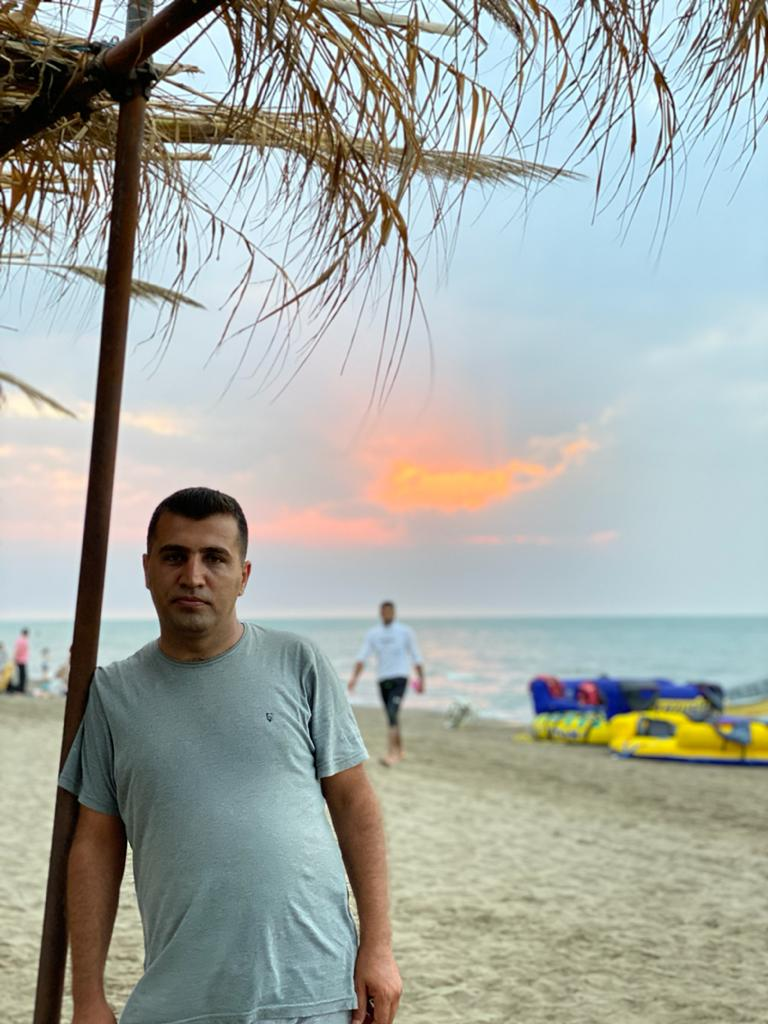
- Born: Vahid Najafi Nakhjevanlou; 23 September 1988 (age 38); Ahar, East Azerbaijan province, Iran
- Education: Political Geography; at University of Tehran
- Occupations: Author; Researcher; Environmental movement

Vahid Najafi Nakhjevanlou (Persian: وحید نجفی نخجوانلو; born September 23, 1988) is an Iranian writer, researcher and environmental activist in Iran. He is a critic of the way water is used in Iran. Najafi is the winner of the award of the best researcher in the field of political geography in 2023 from the Festival of Writers of the Ancient Land in Iran.

== Career ==
Vahid Najafi Nakhjevanlou was born on September 23, 1988, in Ahar city of Azarbaijan province in Iran. He has a PhD in Political Geography from Tehran University. Najafi is a researcher in the field of political geography and an environmental activist in the field of using underground water resources in Iran.

== Bibliography ==
- The politicization of Iran's waters
- Inland water security and its impact on Iran's national security (article)

== Awards and honors ==
- The best researcher of political geography in the festival of writers of the ancient land
