= Vahid-Dastjerdi =

Vahid-Dastjerdi is a surname. Notable people with the surname include:

- Hamid Vahid-Dastjerdi (born 1959), Iranian philosopher
- Marzieh Vahid-Dastjerdi (born 1959), Iranian academic and politician, daughter of Seifollah
- Seifollah Vahid Dastjerdi (1926–1999), Iranian physician
