= Ahar =

City in East Azerbaijan province, Iran

Ahar Persian: اهر
- City
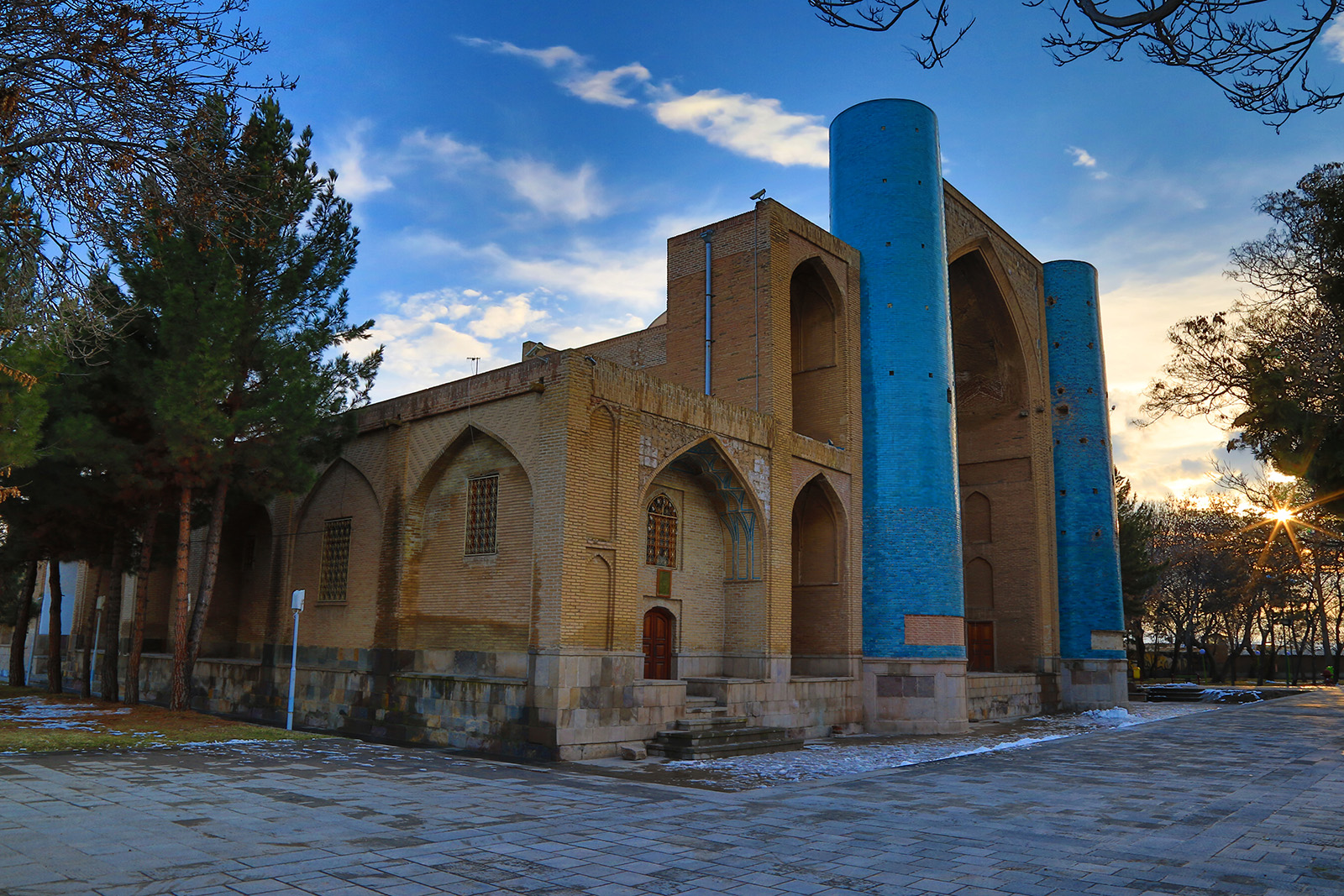
- Sheikh Shahab tomb in the city of Ahar

- Location within Iran
- Coordinates: 38°28′47″N 47°04′01″E
- Country: Iran
- Province: East Azerbaijan
- County: Ahar
- District: Central

Population (2016)
  - Total: 100,641
- Time zone: UTC+3:30 (IRST)

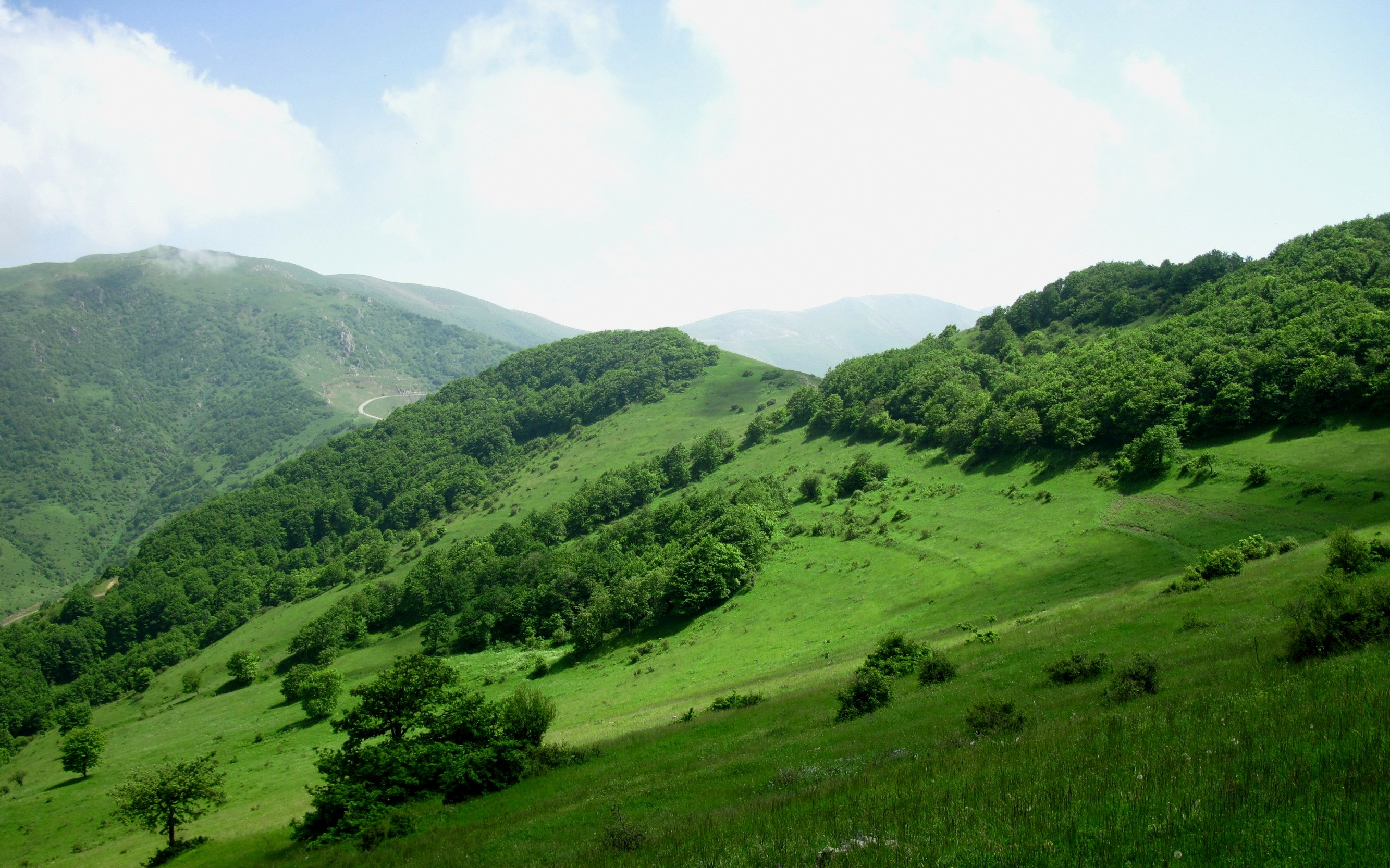
Aqdash was the resting place of muleteers who carried charcoal to Ahar.

Ahar (Persian: اهر) (Note: Azerbaijani: اهر) is a city in the Central District of Ahar County, East Azerbaijan province, Iran, serving as capital of both the county and the district. Ahar was the capital of Karadag Khanate in 18th and 19th centuries.

== History ==
Ahar is one of the ancient cities of the Azerbaijan region, its name before Islam was "meimad". In the 12th-13th centuries, Ahar was a minor and short-lived, but prosperous emirate ruled by the Pishteginid dynasty of Georgian origin (1155—1231). Yaqut al-Hamawi, writing in early thirteenth century, describes Ahar as very flourishing despite its small extent.

The city lost most of its importance during the rule of Ilkhanate. Hamdallah Mustawfi, writing in mid fourteenth century, describes Ahar as a little town. He estimates the tax revenue of the town to be comparable to that of Mardanaqom, which presently is a medium-sized village.

Ahar was in the focus of Safavid's agenda for casting of Azerbaijan as a Safavid dominion. Thus, Shah Abbas I rebuilt the mausoleum of Sheikh Sheikh Shihab-al-din in Ahar.

Ahar suffered enormously during the Russo-Persian War of 1804–1813 and Russo-Persian War of 1826–1828. Western travelers in 1837-1843 period had found Ahar, a city with around 700 households, in wretched condition. Their impression was that the Qajar princes, who were dispatched as the governors of Qaradagh hastened to collect as much wealth as possible before their removal.

Ahar was one of the epicenters of Persian Constitutional Revolution due to the involvement of Arasbaran tribes in armed conflicts; the revolutionary and ati-revolutionary camps were headed, respectively, by Sattar Khan and Rahimkhan Chalabianloo, both from Qaradağ region. When in 1925 Rezā Shāh deposed Ahmad Shah Qajar and founded the Pahlavi dynasty, Ahar's gradual decline started. The new king insisted on ethnic nationalism and cultural unitarism and implemented his policies with forced detribalization and sedentarization. He renamed Qaradağ as Arasbaran to deny the Turkic identity of the inhabitants. This policy, in particular, resulted in suppression of ethnic Azeris.

For further information on the history of Ahar and Arasbaran region one may consult the following scholarly books (all in Persian language):

- H. Bayburdi "The history of Arasbaran",
- Ḥusayn Dūstī, "The history and geography of Arasbaran",
- N. Sedqi, "The contemporary political and social history of Arasbaran",
- S.R. Alemohammad, "The book of Arasbaran".

Two concise English language articles are the following:

- "The Tribes of Qarāca Dāġ: A Brief History" by P. Oberling.
- The entry "AHAR", in Encyclopædia Iranica.

== Demographics ==
=== Population ===
At the time of the 2006 National Census, the city's population was 85,782 in 20,844 households. The following census in 2011 counted 92,608 people in 24,810 households. The 2016 census measured the population of the city as 100,641 people in 30,129 households.

== Overview ==
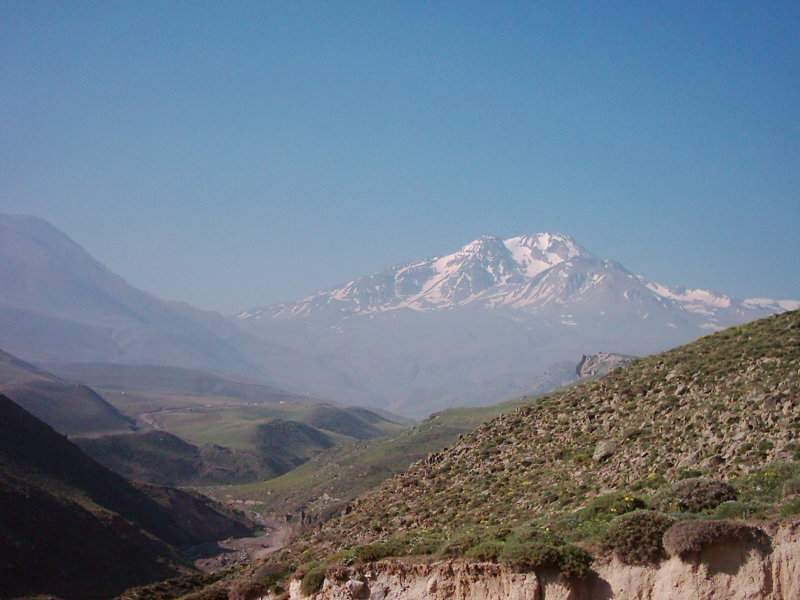
Mount Sabalan is in the proximity of Ahar

In the wake of the Russo-Persian War (1804–13) and with 3,500 inhabitants, Ahar was the only city of Qaradağ. Around the mid-1830s, the population was estimated to be from five to six thousand inhabitants in about 600 houses. By 1956 the population had increased to 19,816. At the 2016 census, its population had increased to over 100,000. Despite this population boom, the city has been losing its former importance to the much smaller neighboring Kaleybar, as the latter is gaining nationwide fame as a tourist destination.

== Climate ==
Ahar has a cold semi-arid climate (BSk) according to the Köppen climate classification.

Climate data for Ahar(normals and extremes 1991-2020) elevation:1391
Month	Jan	Feb	Mar	Apr	May	Jun	Jul	Aug	Sep	Oct	Nov	Dec	Year
Record high °C (°F)	17.4 (63.3)	21.0 (69.8)	26.4 (79.5)	31.0 (87.8)	33.6 (92.5)	39.0 (102.2)	39.4 (102.9)	40.0 (104.0)	35.4 (95.7)	30.3 (86.5)	23.2 (73.8)	20.5 (68.9)	40.0 (104.0)
Mean daily maximum °C (°F)	4.2 (39.6)	5.8 (42.4)	11.0 (51.8)	16.6 (61.9)	21.7 (71.1)	26.5 (79.7)	28.6 (83.5)	28.7 (83.7)	25.0 (77.0)	19.5 (67.1)	11.6 (52.9)	6.5 (43.7)	17.1 (62.9)
Daily mean °C (°F)	−0.5 (31.1)	0.7 (33.3)	5.1 (41.2)	10.3 (50.5)	15.0 (59.0)	19.6 (67.3)	22.4 (72.3)	22.1 (71.8)	18.0 (64.4)	12.6 (54.7)	5.9 (42.6)	1.6 (34.9)	11.1 (51.9)
Mean daily minimum °C (°F)	−4.7 (23.5)	−3.6 (25.5)	0.1 (32.2)	4.6 (40.3)	8.6 (47.5)	12.4 (54.3)	15.7 (60.3)	15.5 (59.9)	11.8 (53.2)	7.1 (44.8)	1.4 (34.5)	−2.4 (27.7)	5.5 (42.0)
Record low °C (°F)	−23.2 (−9.8)	−20.5 (−4.9)	−18.4 (−1.1)	−15.8 (3.6)	−4.0 (24.8)	2.6 (36.7)	7.8 (46.0)	7.0 (44.6)	1.5 (34.7)	−3.5 (25.7)	−16.6 (2.1)	−19.2 (−2.6)	−23.2 (−9.8)
Average precipitation mm (inches)	18.3 (0.72)	21.1 (0.83)	33.8 (1.33)	45.0 (1.77)	48.3 (1.90)	22.6 (0.89)	8.6 (0.34)	6.2 (0.24)	11.0 (0.43)	24.5 (0.96)	27.5 (1.08)	19.5 (0.77)	286.4 (11.26)
Average precipitation days (≥ 1.0 mm)	4.1	4.8	6.5	8.2	8.9	3.8	1.9	1.2	2	3.8	4.7	4	53.9
Average relative humidity (%)	65	64	61	61	61	53	49	49	57	59	64	64	59
Average dew point °C (°F)	−6.9 (19.6)	−6.0 (21.2)	−2.9 (26.8)	1.7 (35.1)	6.2 (43.2)	8.6 (47.5)	10.2 (50.4)	9.9 (49.8)	8.1 (46.6)	3.6 (38.5)	−1.4 (29.5)	−5.2 (22.6)	2.2 (35.9)
Mean monthly sunshine hours	168	164	179	188	248	301	312	304	256	211	167	162	2,660
Source: NOAA NCEI

Climate data for Ahar(1986-2010 normals)
Month	Jan	Feb	Mar	Apr	May	Jun	Jul	Aug	Sep	Oct	Nov	Dec	Year
Mean daily maximum °C (°F)	3.3 (37.9)	4.9 (40.8)	10.0 (50.0)	16.3 (61.3)	21.0 (69.8)	25.9 (78.6)	28.1 (82.6)	28.3 (82.9)	24.8 (76.6)	19.0 (66.2)	11.6 (52.9)	6.1 (43.0)	16.6 (61.9)
Daily mean °C (°F)	−0.8 (30.6)	0.4 (32.7)	4.8 (40.6)	10.4 (50.7)	14.6 (58.3)	19.0 (66.2)	21.8 (71.2)	21.9 (71.4)	18.1 (64.6)	13.1 (55.6)	6.6 (43.9)	1.9 (35.4)	11.0 (51.8)
Mean daily minimum °C (°F)	−4.9 (23.2)	−4.0 (24.8)	−0.3 (31.5)	4.5 (40.1)	8.2 (46.8)	12.1 (53.8)	15.4 (59.7)	15.4 (59.7)	11.5 (52.7)	7.1 (44.8)	1.6 (34.9)	−2.4 (27.7)	5.3 (41.6)
Average precipitation mm (inches)	16.8 (0.66)	19.1 (0.75)	32.9 (1.30)	45.2 (1.78)	48.9 (1.93)	23.8 (0.94)	6.7 (0.26)	6.2 (0.24)	12.7 (0.50)	26.9 (1.06)	26.4 (1.04)	19.6 (0.77)	285.2 (11.23)
Average snowy days	8.0	8.2	7.6	2.0	0.2	0	0	0	0	0.7	3.1	6.8	36.6
Average dew point °C (°F)	−7.0 (19.4)	−6.7 (19.9)	−3.4 (25.9)	1.5 (34.7)	5.7 (42.3)	8.6 (47.5)	10.5 (50.9)	11.0 (51.8)	7.7 (45.9)	3.4 (38.1)	−1.4 (29.5)	−5.0 (23.0)	2.1 (35.7)
Mean monthly sunshine hours	158.6	162.9	173.3	179.3	246.7	292.7	311.6	298.5	252.6	204.1	161.5	155.8	2,597.6
Source: IRIMO(Temperatures)(Precipitation) (Snow and Sleet days)(Sun)(Dew Point 1986-2005)

== Economy ==
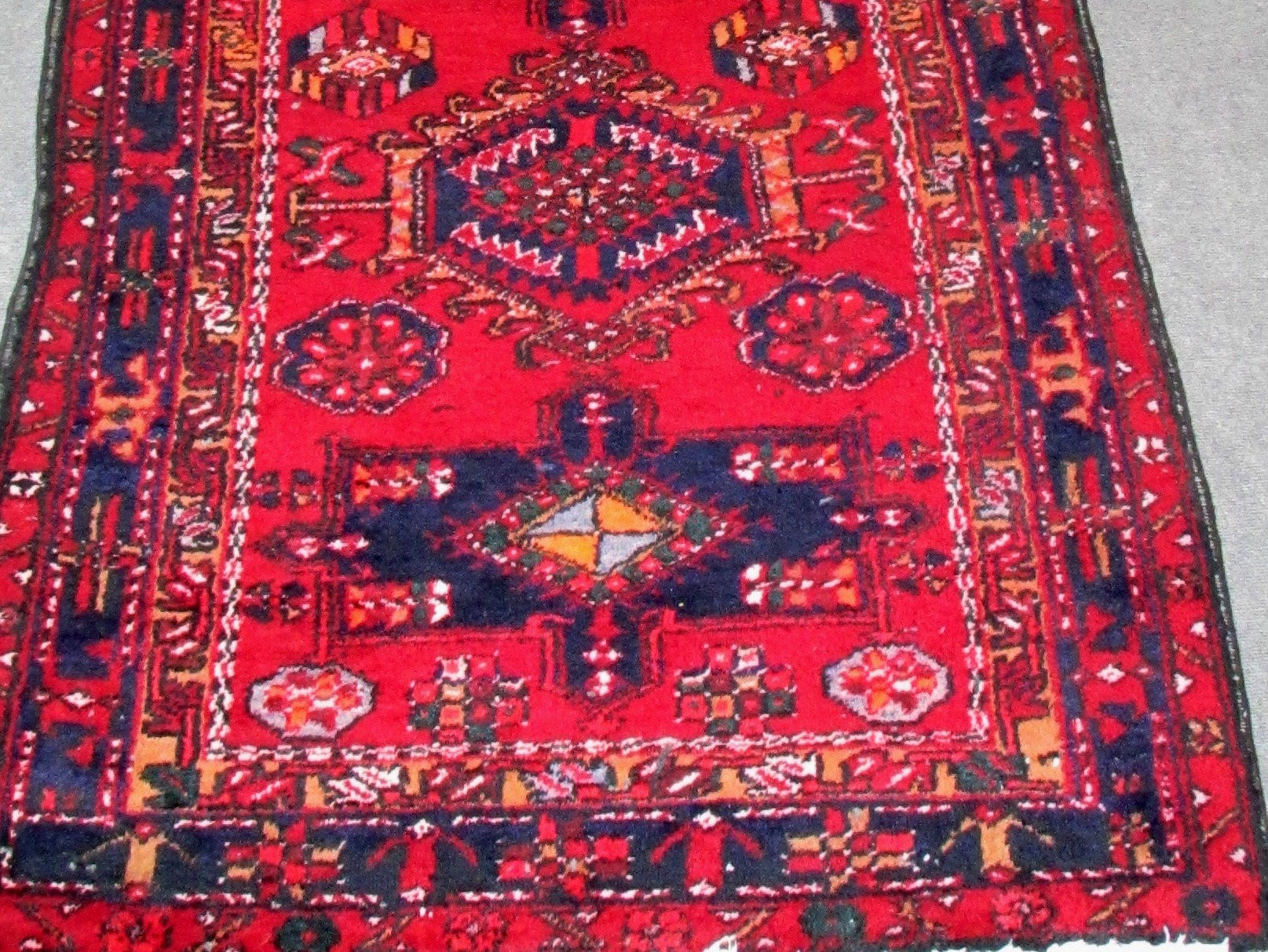
Balan Rug; An example of carpets which used to be sold in Ahar's bazar.

Until the early 1960s Ahar was the economic hub of Arasbaran region. Arasbaran nomadic tribes bartered their produce in Ahar's bazaar. The charcoal produced in villages adjacent to Arasbaran forests was carried by muleteers to Ahar and from there was transported to Tabriz. In addition, Ahar was a distribution center for the Arasbaran rug. The gradual settlement of nomads, widespread use of fossil fuels, changing life-styles, and establishment of new marketplaces such as Kaleybar through facilitated transportation, have diminished Ahar's economical importance.

== Tourism ==
The main tourist site in the city is the mausoleum of Sheikh Shaabe-deen, who was the teacher of Safi-ad-din Ardabili, the founder of the family of Safavid dynasty. The monument has been described by James Morier in early nineteenth century as the following, "The mausoleum is of brick, with a foundation of stone, and faced by an elevated portico, flanked by two minors or pillars encrusted with green tiles. A little wooden door was opened for us in the back of the building, which introduced us into the spot that contained the tomb of the Sheikh, which was enclosed by a stone railing, carved into open work, and surrounded by a sculptured arabesque ornament, of very good taste. The tomb is distinguished by a marble cover, on which is an Arabic inscription in relieve.".

== Notable people ==
- Sattar Khan, leader of the constitutionalist rebels, considered the national hero of Iran
- Amir Arshad, military commander and leader of the Haji-Alilu tribe
- Vahid Najafi Nakhjevanlou (born 1988), writer, researcher and environmental activist
- Abu Bakr Qutbi, 14th-century historian

== Gallery ==
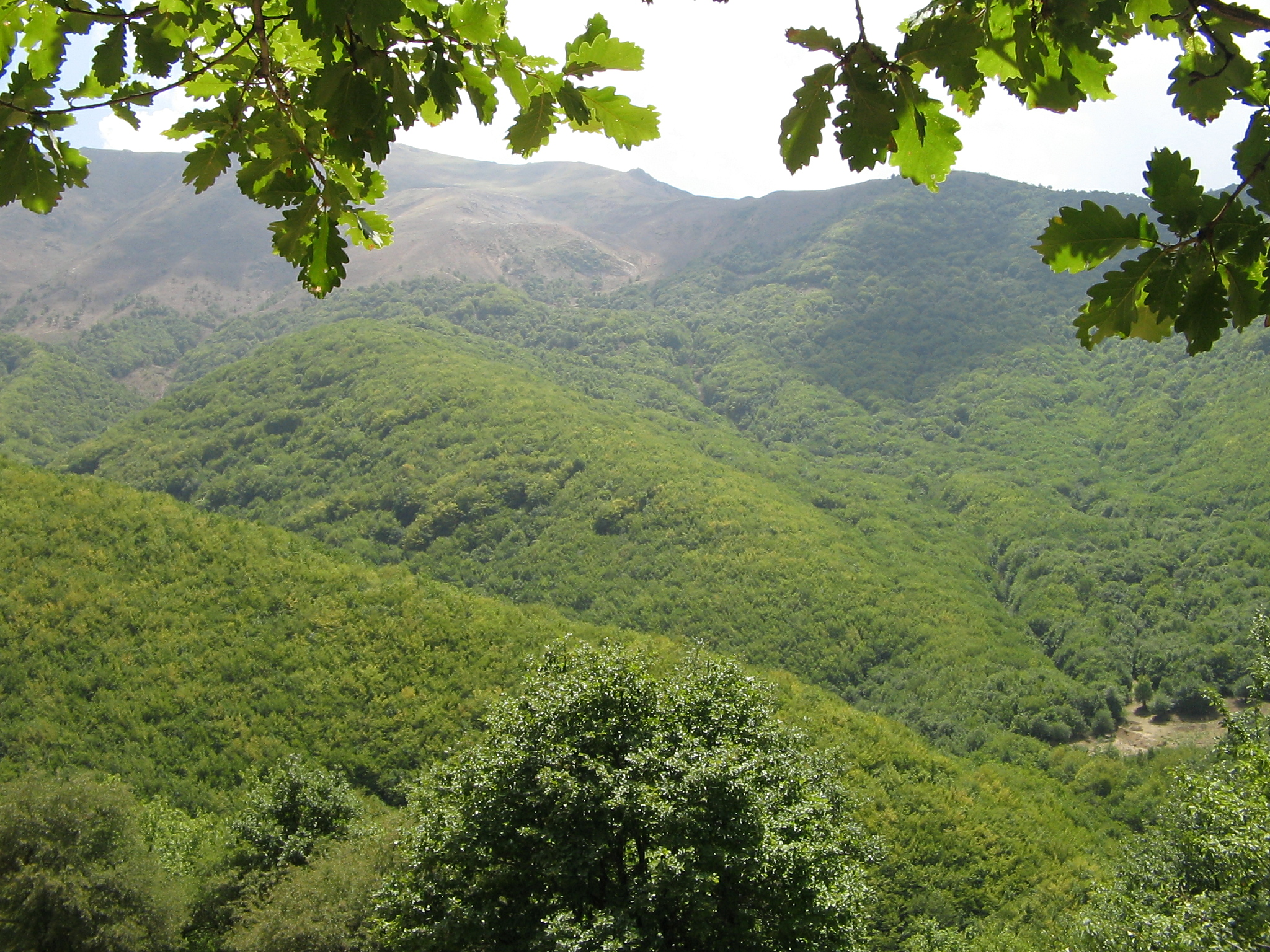
Arasbaran forests in the vicinity of Ahar (Kaleibar county)

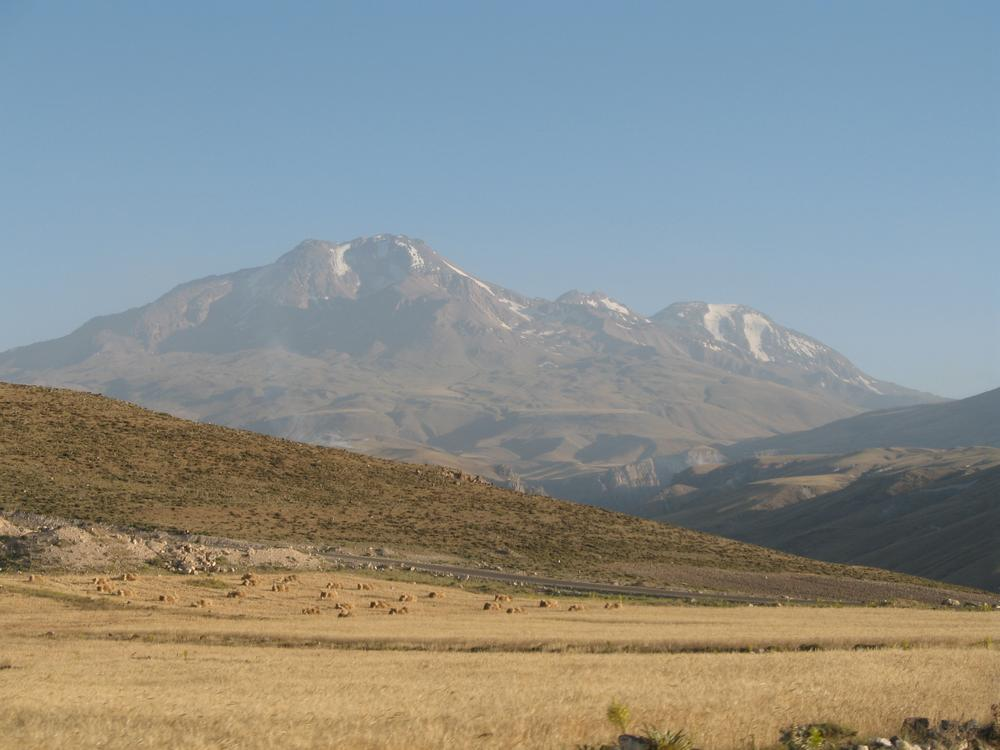
Ahar town lies on the north-west face of Mount Sabalan
