= Eldar Mansurov =

Azerbaijani composer (born 1952)

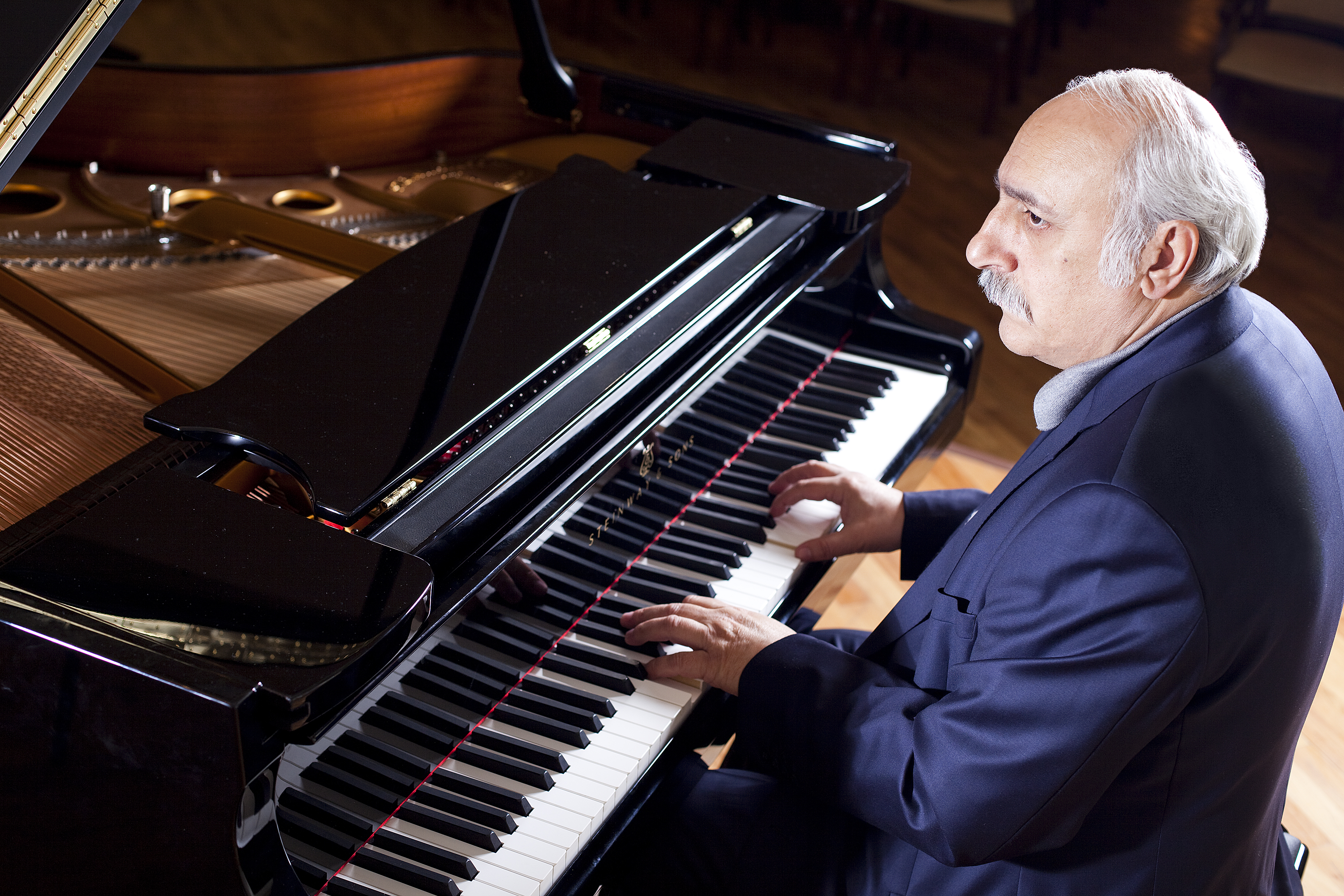

Background information
- Born: Eldar Bahram oglu Mansurov; 28 February 1952 (age 74)
- Origin: Baku, Azerbaijan SSR
- Genres: Classical music, Pop, traditional
- Occupation: Composer
- Instrument: Piano
- Years active: 1969–present
- Website: www.eldarmansurov.com

Eldar Bahram oglu Mansurov (Azerbaijani: Eldar Bəhram oğlu Mansurov, IPA: [elˈdɑɾ bæhˈɾɑm oɣˈlu mɑnˈsuɾov]; born February 28, 1952) is an Azerbaijani musician, composer and songwriter.

== Early life and education ==
Eldar Mansurov was born on 28 February 1952 in the Inner City of Baku into a musical family. From 1968 to 1972, he studied piano at the Asaf Zeynally Music School (now the Azerbaijan National Conservatory Music College). From 1974 to 1979, he studied composition under Professor Jovdat Hajiyev at the Uzeyir Hajibeyov Azerbaijan State Conservatory (now the Baku Music Academy).

He is the author of the rock opera Seven Beauties, the rock ballets Cleopatra and Olympus, five symphonies, the symphonic mugham Mahur-Hindi, a concerto for violin and symphony orchestra, as well as numerous symphonic, chamber, and choral works. He has also composed music for a number of films and stage plays and is the author of over 3,000 songs and instrumental pieces.

In 1983 and 1987, he delivered presentations on the history of mugham at international symposiums held in Samarkand.

== Professional affiliations and recognition ==
Since 1981, he has been a member of the Union of Composers — first of the USSR, and later of Azerbaijan. Since 1999, he has also been a member of the Union of Cinematographers of Azerbaijan.

For his contributions to the development of Azerbaijani culture, he was awarded the honorary title of Honored Art Worker of Azerbaijan in 2005 and People's Artist of Azerbaijan in 2012. On 28 February 2022, President Ilham Aliyev awarded him the Order of Glory (Shohrat) for his services to the development of Azerbaijani musical art.

On 2 October 2022, the Ministry of Culture held a grand creative evening dedicated to Eldar Mansurov's 70th anniversary at the Heydar Aliyev Palace.

Since 21 February 2012, he has been a recipient of a personal presidential stipend from the Republic of Azerbaijan. From 2007 to 2012, he served as Secretary of the Union of Composers of Azerbaijan.

== Artistic career ==
=== Bayatilar ===
Eldar Mansurov's most renowned composition, Bayatilar, was first performed in 1989 by then-rising Azerbaijani pop star Brilliant Dadashova. The song gained instant popularity and was released in 1990 by the Soviet record label Melodiya in large circulation across the former USSR. Set to lyrics by poet Vahid Aziz, the piece remains one of the most beloved songs in Azerbaijani music history. Over the decades, Bayatilar has been adapted by artists in Turkmenistan, Russia, Turkey, Greece, Germany, Italy, Spain, France, Romania, Bosnia and Herzegovina, Croatia, the U.S., U.K., Sweden, Canada, Israel, Arab countries, and even Brazil.

- In Russia, the song was performed by Reno under the title Zdravstvuy with lyrics by Nikolay Denisov.
- In Brazil, it was recorded as a vocalise by jazz singer Monica Salmaso with the Orquestra Popular de Câmara, and later as an instrumental version by pianist Benjamin Taubkin's group.
- In Turkey, legendary singer Sezen Aksu created a new version titled Zalim, which became a major hit. It was later performed by Levent Yüksel in a music video and has remained popular for years.
- In Greece, it appeared in various adaptations, such as Taxidiariko Bird by Petros Dourdumbakis and Oses Foties by Dimitra Galani.
- DJs and bands from Italy, Germany, Israel, Romania, Sweden, Canada, Bosnia, and the U.K. have also incorporated Bayatilar into hip-hop, electronic, jazz, and rock renditions.

=== International covers ===
In 2011, Romanian DJ Edward Maya incorporated Bayatilar into his worldwide hit Stereo Love, leading to a co-authorship agreement with Mansurov.

A notable copyright dispute arose over the Greek pop song Esena Mono (2003), performed by Keti Garbi and credited to Dimitris Kontopoulos. Mansurov alleged unauthorized use of Bayatilar's melody. After over a decade of legal proceedings, in 2023, the Greek Supreme Court ruled in Mansurov's favor, confirming copyright infringement.

=== Bahramnameh projects ===
Eldar Mansurov dedicated the symphonic fusion project Bahramnameh to the memory of his father, Bahram Mansurov — a legendary tar player whose performances of Azerbaijani mugham were first published on vinyl by UNESCO in the 1970s.

The project, which blends symphony, rock, jazz, and mugham into a genre Mansurov calls “symfo-folk-rock,” premiered in 2005 at the Heydar Aliyev Palace with support from UNESCO Goodwill Ambassador Mehriban Aliyeva. The live performance featured an ensemble including pianists Nazim Ahmad and Ilgar Bakikhanov, guitarist Rafiq Rasulov, bassist Ramiz Aghazade, percussionist Sergey Krasnyanski, and tar soloist Yashar Huseynov. His brother Elkhan Mansurov performed classical mugham pieces on their father's tar..

Bahramnameh-2, presented later, introduced a large symphonic orchestra alongside traditional Azerbaijani instruments such as ney, balaban, and tutek. It explored lesser-known mugham modes like Qafqaz Humayunu, Nəva-Nişabur, Çoban Bayatı, and Kürdü-Şahnaz, creating a richly original two-part suite (instrumental and vocal), including the use of a cappella choir.

== Research, publications, and notation work ==
Eldar Mansurov has also contributed to the theory and history of Azerbaijani music. As early as his student years, he authored scholarly articles on mugham theory and its modal system. His research was presented at the 1987 International Mugham Symposium in Samarkand and later compiled in the book Muğam Düşüncələrim (1995).

In addition, he transcribed many of his father's mugham performances into notation — including traditional dəraməd, rəng, diringə, and tasnif forms — preserving rare folk melodies and performance traditions.

His genealogical research into the Mansurov family, tracing its roots in Baku back to the early 17th century, resulted in several published works.

=== Selected books ===
- Muğam Düşüncələrim ("My Mugham Reflections"), Irshad Publishing, 1995
- Məşədi Süleyman bəy Mansurov. Xatirələr, EQ Publishing, 2005
- Mansurovlar: A Family History, EQ Publishing, 2006
- Mansurovlar, Heydar Aliyev Foundation / Çaşıoğlu, 2011

=== Selected articles ===
- “Comparative Analysis of Rast and Mahur-Hindi Mugham,” Qobustan, No. 3, 1980
- “The Past, Present, and Future of Rast and Mahur-Hindi,” Qobustan, No. 4 (64), 1984
- “On the Origin of Mugham Names,” Qobustan, No. 1, 1987
- “Saqinama Genre in Azerbaijani Music,” Proceedings of the Azerbaijan Academy of Sciences, Vol. XLIII, No. 8, 1987
- “Huseyngulu Khan Bakuvi,” Icherisheher, No. 3, Winter 2008–2009

=== Notation publications ===
- Azerbaijani Dəraməd and Rəng Pieces, Ishiq Publishing, 1984
- Azerbaijani Diringə and Rəng Pieces (with Azad Karimov), Ishiq Publishing, 1986
- Ancient Azerbaijani Folk Melodies, Ishiq Publishing, 1990

== Selected works ==
- 12 Preludes for piano (1974)
- Sonatina for piano (1975)
- Poem for violin and piano (1976)
- String Quartet No. 1 (1977)
- Concerto for violin and symphony orchestra (1978)
- Symphony No. 1 (1979)
- Pieces for string orchestra (1979)
- Music for String Instruments (1980)
- Pastoral for string quartet (1981)
- Bayatilar for a cappella choir (1981)
- Symphony No. 2 for chamber orchestra (1981)
- 2 Romances for baritone and piano (1982)
- Adagio and Scherzo for flute and piano (1982)
- Symphony No. 3 (1982)
- 2 Songs for children's choir (1982)
- 6 Pieces for wind septet (1983)
- Saqinama for tar and string quartet (1983)
- March for wind orchestra (1983)
- Pastoral for chamber orchestra (1984)
- Sonata for violin and piano (1985)
- My Homeland — a cycle of songs for children's choir (1985)
- Cantata “Immortality” (lyrics by B. Vahidzadeh) (1985)
- Pieces for Piano for Children — a cycle (1986)
- 14 Preludes for piano (1986)
- String Quartet No. 2 (1986)
- 6 Preludes for piano (1986)
- Rubato for harpsichord, celesta, and piano (1986)
- Rubaiyat — a cappella choir on poems by Omar Khayyam, Nizami Ganjavi, and Saadi Shirazi (1987)
- Pieces for 2 double basses (1988)
- Mugham-Dastgah for organ (1989)
- Mahur-Hindi symphonic mugham (1990–1991)
- Symphony No. 4 (1991)
- Frescoes for chamber orchestra (1991)
- Adagio for violin and symphony orchestra (1991)
- Passacaglia for symphony orchestra (1991)
- Various pieces for pop-symphonic orchestra (various years)
- Over 3,000 songs and instrumental pieces (various years)
- Cleopatra — rock ballet (1998)
- Olympus — one-act rock ballet (2004)
- Bahramnameh — music for tar, symphony orchestra, and rock band (2004)
- Seven Beauties — rock opera (2005)
- Symphonic Dances (2010)
- Land of Fire — suite for symphony orchestra (2012)
- Son of Spring — oratorio (2013)
- Symphonic Gravures I (2017)
- Symphonic Gravures II (2023)

== Author concerts ==
- Eldar Mansurov's Song Evening – Russian Drama Theatre (9 April 1996)
- Eldar Mansurov's New Concert Program – “Faithful Friends” – Republic Palace (14 July 1996)
- Eldar Mansurov's New Concert Program – “Carriage of Love” – Republic Palace (5 October 1996)
- Eldar Mansurov's New Concert Program – “Caravan of Songs” – Opera and Ballet Theatre (7 May 1997)
- Creative Evening of Eldar Mansurov – Zughulba "Gənclik" International Tourism Center (9 August 1997)
- Eldar Mansurov's New Concert Program – “Star Shower” – Republic Palace (20 June 1998)
- Eldar Mansurov's New Concert Program – “Tales of Icherisheher” – Republic Palace (3 March 2001)
- Eldar Mansurov's New Project – “Bahramnameh” – Heydar Aliyev Palace (1 December 2005)
- Jubilee Concert Dedicated to the 70th Anniversary of Eldar Mansurov – Heydar Aliyev Palace (2 October 2022)
- Creative Evening Featuring Symphonic Works by Eldar Mansurov – Azerbaijan State Philharmonic Hall (17 November 2023)
- Eldar Mansurov: Symphonic Gravures – Ferenc Liszt Academy of Music, Budapest (17 June 2024)
- Eldar Mansurov: Symphonic Gravures – Auditorium Conciliazione, Rome (28 May 2025)

== Filmography ==
- Aran (1985)
- Is There an End to the March? (1985)
- Neftçi-87 (1987)
- When Measure is Lost (Əndazədən çıxanda, 1988)
- The Mirror (Güzgü, 1990)
- Bəxtəvər (1990)
- Almas Ildırım (1991)
- The Engagement Ring (Bəxt üzüyü, 1991)
- I Burn for the Sacred Flame (Müqəddəs oda yanaram, 1991)
- The Metaphysical or the Unintended Logical Error (Fövqəldünya və ya qəsdsiz məntiqi səhv, 1992)
- Sea Voyage (Dəniz səyahəti, 1992)
- Painful Salvation (Əzablı qurtuluş, 1993)
- Day of Vengeance (Qisas günü, 1993)
- Occupation (İşğal, 1994)
- Judgment (Hökm, 1994)
- The Burden (Yük, 1995)
- Bala-başa bəla! (1995)
- The Turks (Türklər, 2004)
- The Mouse and the Cat (Siçan və Pişik, 2008)
- Our Capital Baku (Bizim paytaxt Bakımız, 2008)
- The City Built of Stone (Daşdan tikilmiş şəhər, 2008)
- History of Our Security (Təhlükəsizliyimizin tarixi, 2009)
- Heydar Aliyev (1999–2013)
- Spider Web (Hörümçək toru, 2011)
- My Grandfather and I (Babam və mən, 2012)
- The Caterpillar's Dream (Tırtılın arzusu, 2012)
- Sounds of the Tar. The Mansurovs (Tarın sədaları. Mansurovlar, 2013)
- Be My Sunshine (Günəşim ol, 2016)

== Music for theatrical productions ==
- Live Music (Canlı musiqi, 1982)
- The Gallows Tree (Dar ağacı, 1986)
- The Dervish and Death (Dərviş və ölüm, 1986)
- The Chestnut Horse (The Wall) (Kürən at (Divar), 1988)
- Doors Knocked at Night (Gecə döyülən qapılar, 1989)
- My Lover's Mother (Sevgilimin anası, 1989)
- Chalabi Khan (Çələbi xan, 1990)
- The Honey Barrel (Bal çəlləyi, 1991)
- The Giant Froglet (Nəhəng qurbağa balası, 1991)
- My White City (Mənim ağ şəhərim, 1991)
- The She-Wolf (Dişi canavar, 1991)
- Mistresses (Məşuqələr, 1992)
- The Madman of Money (Pul dəlisi, 1992)
- Oh Women, Women (Ah qadınlar qadınlar, 1992)
- A Musical, Smiling Journey (Nəğməli, təbəssümlü səyahət, 1992)
- I Want to Get Married (Evlənmək istəyirəm, 1993)
- Actor (Aktyor, 1994)
- Trickster Girls (Kələkbaz qızlar, 1994)
- People of This World (Bu dünyanın adamları, 2000)
- Nights in Egypt (Misir gecələri, 2004)
- Şeyda (2008)
- The Heartless (Vicdansız, 2009)
- The Grooming Lesson (Bəylik dərsi, 2009)
- The Last Episode (Sonuncu seriya, 2010)
- Khanish's Wedding (Xanışın toyu, 2014)
- Old Tales of the New Year (Təzə ilin köhnə nağılları, 2015)
- Desperate Marriage (Çarəsiz evlənmə, 2015)
- My Heart Stayed in Shusha (Şuşada ürəyim qaldı, 2022)

== Family ==
Eldar Mansurov is a descendant of Mashadi Malik bey Mansurov and the grandson of Mashadi Suleyman bey Mansurov. He is the son of tar player Bahram Mansurov and the brother of tar player Elkhan Mansurov and cinematographer Aydin Mansurov. He is the father of Ulvi Mansurov and Anar Mansurov.
