= Vahid Sarlak =

Iranian judoka

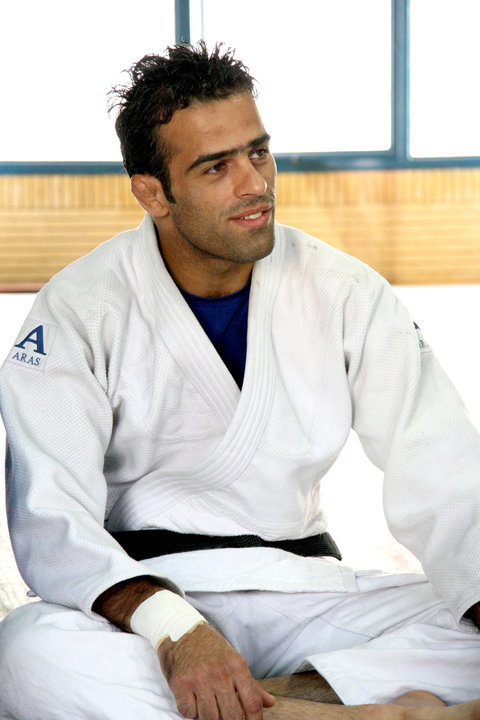

Personal information
- Nationality: Iranian-German
- Born: 20 January 1981 (age 45) Iran
- Height: 170 cm (5 ft 7 in)
- Weight: 60 kg (132 lb)

Sport
- Country: Iran; Germany
- Sport: Judo
- Event: –60 kg
- Club: 1 Judo Club Mönchengladbach
- Retired: 2012

Vahid Sarlak (born January 20, 1981) is an Iranian-German judoka. Overall he has won 18 medals – 5 gold, 6 silver and 7 bronze at different international contests. Sarlak began his Judo practice in 1994 at the age of 13 in Tehran, Iran, and earned his first silver medal at the Asian Youth Championships in 2000 in Hong Kong. Since then he competed in Judo tournaments earning international awards.

He came close to winning the gold medal at the 2005 World Judo Championships in Cairo. However, because of the Iranian government's political issues with Israel, Sarlak was ordered by the Iranian Federation to lose to his Azerbaijani competitor to avoid competing against an Israeli opponent in the next round.

Sarlak continued to compete internationally, and in 2009, after achieving 5th place in the World Championships at Rotterdam, Netherlands, he expatriated from Iran due to the effect his country's political issues had on his career. Later he became a legal resident of the German Judo Federation and shortly thereafter joined the German Bundesliga Judo team.

Sarlak has stated in interviews that he is not politically minded but believes that political divergence or agendas should not interfere with sports or any public occasion where different cultures and nationalities connect. He is quoted as saying, "Judo is a sport in which manners and respecting the other is the first lesson. Asian, African, American, etc. are all human beings and if there are any existing issues, it should be handled when stepping on the tatemi!"

Sarlak was the head coach of Tajikistan's national judo team in 2019 World Judo Championships in Tokyo.

Sarlak is now the head coach of the refugee judo team at the Paris Olympics 2024.

On 9 January 2026, during the 2025–2026 Iranian protests, Sarlak publicly opposed the Iranian government's internet blackouts in an attempt to quell the protests, and called for international forums to engage in dialogue with Reza Pahlavi, Crown Prince of Iran.
