= 2023 in Japanese football =

Football in Japan
- Season: 2023

Men's football
- J1 League: Vissel Kobe (1st title)
- J2 League: Machida Zelvia (1st title)
- J3 League: Ehime (1st title, 2nd tier title)
- JFL: Honda FC (10th JFL title, 6th tier title)
- Emperor's Cup: Kawasaki Frontale (2nd title)
- JL Cup: Avispa Fukuoka (1st title)
- Super Cup: Yokohama F. Marinos (1st title)

Women's football
- WL Cup: Urawa Red Diamonds (1st title)

This article summarizes Japanese football in the 2023 season.

== National teams ==
Source: JFA

=== Men's ===
==== Senior ====
15 June 2023 Kirin Challenge Cup	Japan	6–0	El Salvador	Toyota, Japan
19:10 UTC+9	Taniguchi 1'; Ueda 4' (pen.); Kubo 25'; Dōan 44'; Nakamura 60'; Furuhashi 73'	Report		Stadium: Toyota Stadium; Attendance: 37,403; Referee: Andrew Madley (England)

20 June 2023 Kirin Challenge Cup	Japan	4–1	Peru	Suita, Japan
18:55 UTC+9	H. Ito 22'; Mitoma 37'; J. Itō 63'; Maeda 75'	Report	Gonzáles 83'	Stadium: Panasonic Stadium Suita; Attendance: 35,001; Referee: Khamis Al-Marri (Qatar)

9 September Friendly	Germany	1–4	Japan	Wolfsburg, Germany
20:45 UTC+2	Sané 19'	Report	J. Itō 11'; Ueda 22'; Asano 90'; Tanaka 90+2'	Stadium: Volkswagen Arena; Attendance: 24,980; Referee: João Pinheiro (Portugal)

12 September 2023 Kirin Challenge Cup	Japan	4–2	Turkey	Genk, Belgium
14:20 UTC+2	A. Ito 15'; Nakamura 28', 36'; J. Itō 78' (pen.)	Report	Kabak 44'; Yıldırım 61'	Stadium: Cegeka Arena; Attendance: 7,202; Referee: Allard Lindhout (Netherlands)

13 October 2023 Mizuho Blue Dream Match	Japan	4–1	Canada	Niigata, Japan
19:35 UTC+9	Tanaka 2', 49'; Davies 40' (o.g.); Nakamura 42'	Report	Hoilett 89'	Stadium: Denka Big Swan Stadium; Attendance: 37,125; Referee: Alex King (Australia)

17 October 2023 Kirin Challenge Cup	Japan	2–0	Tunisia	Kobe, Japan
19:10 UTC+9	Furuhashi 43'; J. Ito 69'	Report		Stadium: Noevir Stadium Kobe; Attendance: 26,529; Referee: Wang Di (China)

16 November 2026 World Cup qualification	Japan	5–0	Myanmar	Suita, Japan
19:00 UTC+9	Ueda 11', 45+4', 50'; Kamada 28'; Dôan 86'	Report		Stadium: Panasonic Stadium Suita; Attendance: 34,484; Referee: Muhammad Taqi (Singapore)

21 November 2026 World Cup qualification	Syria	0–5	Japan	Jeddah, Saudi Arabia
17:45 UTC+3		Report	Kubo 32'; Ueda 37', 40'; Sugawara 47'; Hosoya 82'	Stadium: Prince Abdullah Al Faisal Stadium; Attendance: 6,130; Referee: Ma Ning (China)

- Fixtures & Results (2023), JFA.jp

==== U-22 ====
24 March International friendly	Germany	2–2	Japan	Frankfurt, Germany
18:15 UTC+1	Ngankam 40' (pen.); Huseinbašić 49'	Report	Sato 43'; Hosoya 46'	Stadium: Stadion am Bornheimer Hang

28 March International friendly	Belgium	3–2	Japan	Murcia, Spain
18:00 UTC+2		Report		Stadium: Pinatar Arena

10 June International friendly	England	v	Japan	TBD, England
--:--				Stadium: TBD

- Fixtures & Results (2023), JFA.jp

==== University ====
21 March Denso Cup Soccer Challenge	Japan	1–0	South Korea	Saitama, Japan
13:00	Takagi 53'	Report		Stadium: Urawa Komaba Stadium; Attendance: 3,858; Referee: Fuyuhi Hachiya

==== U-20 ====
21 May FIFA U-20 World Cup GS	Senegal	0–1	Japan	La Plata, Argentina
18:00 UTC−3		Report	Matsuki 15'	Stadium: Estadio Único Diego Armando Maradona; Attendance: 8,625; Referee: Serdar Gözübüyük (Netherlands)

24 May FIFA U-20 World Cup GS	Japan	1–2	Colombia	La Plata, Argentina
18:00 UTC−3	Yamane 30'	Report	Asprilla 53'; Ángel 59'	Stadium: Estadio Único Diego Armando Maradona; Attendance: 3,768; Referee: José María Sánchez Martínez (Spain)

27 May FIFA U-20 World Cup GS	Japan	1–2	Israel	Mendoza, Argentina
18:00 UTC−3	Sakamoto 45+1'	Report	Navi 76'; Senior 90+2'	Stadium: Estadio Malvinas Argentinas; Attendance: 7,581; Referee: Piero Maza (Chile)

- Fixtures & Results (U-20 2023), JFA.jp

==== U-19 ====
7 June Maurice Revello Tournament GS	Japan	2–1	Morocco	Fos-sur-Mer, France
14:00 UTC+2	Uchino 72'; Ishii 81'	Report	Raihani 64'	Stadium: Stade Parsemain; Attendance: 350; Referee: Marta Huerta de Aza (Spain)

10 June Maurice Revello Tournament GS	Japan	0–2	Panama	Fos-sur-Mer, France
14:00 UTC+2			Orelien 75'; Perdomo 90+7'	Stadium: Stade Parsemain; Attendance: 300; Referee: Ivana Martinčić (Croatia)

13 June Maurice Revello Tournament GS	Japan	1–2	Ivory Coast	Fos-sur-Mer, France
14:00 UTC+2	Yukutomo 30'		N'Dri 11'; Konaté 57'	Stadium: Stade Parsemain; Referee: Moatasem Al-Mazyed (Qatar)

15 June Maurice Revello Tournament 9th-10th place (Note: Not considered an official international match by FIFA)	Japan	3–3 (6–7 p)	(Europe) U-21 Mediterranean Team	Miramas, France
18:00 UTC+2	Ishii 2', 44'; Yukutomo 65'		Djahafi 55'; Dahmani 64'; Barry 90+6'	Stadium: Stade des Molières; Referee: Moatasem Al-Mazyed (Qatar)
	Penalties
	Uchino (penalty scored); Yukutomo (penalty scored); Hatano (penalty scored); Kuwahara (penalty scored); Ikeda (penalty scored); Hayakawa (penalty scored); Kita (penalty missed)		Khetir (penalty scored); Djahafi (penalty scored); Trinker (penalty scored); Dahmani (penalty scored); Mendy (penalty scored); Okyere (penalty scored); Lasne (penalty scored)

- Fixtures & Results (U-19 2023), JFA.jp

==== U-18 ====
17 August SBS Cup	Japan	0–1	South Korea	Shizuoka, Japan
17:30 JST +09:00		Report	Kang Min-seong 45'	Stadium: Kusanagi Athletic Stadium

18 August SBS Cup	Japan	2–0	(Japan) Shizuoka Prefecture	Shizuoka, Japan
18:30 JST +09:00	Suzuki 26'; Nakagawa 44'	Report		Stadium: Ashitaka Park Stadium

20 August SBS Cup	Japan	2–2 (3–5 p)	(Japan) U-20 Kanto University Selection	Shizuoka, Japan
15:00 JST +09:00	Kuwahara 42'; Shiogai 71'	Report	Matsunaga 18'; Takahashi 20'	Stadium: Ecopa Stadium

15 November Friendly	Japan	0–1	Mexico	Marbella, Spain
13:00 UTC+2		Report	Biscayzacú 90+3'	Stadium: Marbella Football Center

18 November Friendly	Japan	2–3	England	Marbella, Spain
14:00 UTC+2	Shiogai 48', 50'	Report	Wright 14' (pen.); Lankshear 37'; Donley 90'	Stadium: Marbella Football Center

21 November Friendly	Romania	0–2	Japan	Marbella, Spain
11:00 UTC+2		Report	Ozeki 16'; Funabashi 22'	Stadium: Marbella Football Center

21 December Ibaraki Next Gen Cup	U-20 Kanto University Selection (Japan)	1–1	Japan	Mito, Japan
11:00 UTC+9	Ishimoto 86'	Report	Shiogai 11'	Stadium: Twin Field

23 December Ibaraki Next Gen Cup	U-22 All Ibaraki (Japan)	0–0	Japan	Mito, Japan
14:00 UTC+9		Report		Stadium: K's denki Stadium Mito

24 December Ibaraki Next Gen Cup	Japan	4–0	Uzbekistan	Mito, Japan
11:00 UTC+9	Shiogai 2'; Nakagawa 10'; Yasuda 41'; Sato 84'	Report		Stadium: K's denki Stadium Mito

- Fixtures & Results (U-18 2023), JFA.jp

==== U-17 ====
17 June AFC U-17 Asian Cup GS	Japan	1–1	Uzbekistan	Bangkok, Thailand
17:00 UTC+7	Yutaka Michiwaki 9'	Report	Amirbek Saidov 83'	Stadium: Rajamangala Stadium; Referee: Mongkolchai Pechsri (Thailand)

20 June AFC U-17 Asian Cup GS	Vietnam	0–4	Japan	Bangkok, Thailand
17:00 UTC+7		Report	Yutaka Michiwaki 2'; Kohei Mochizuki 59', 74'; Ryunosuke Sato 66'	Stadium: Rajamangala Stadium; Referee: Ali Reda (Lebanon)

23 June AFC U-17 Asian Cup GS	Japan	8–4	India	Bangkok, Thailand
19:00 UTC+7	Gakuto Kawamura 13'; Gaku Nawata 41', 45'; Shuto Nagano 52'; Kohei Mochizuki 54'; Yotaro Nakajima 74'; Gota Yamaguchi 90+6'; Shungo Sugiura 90+8'	Report	Mukul Panwar 47'; Danny Meitei Laishram 62'; Daiki Miyagawa 69' (o.g.); Korou Singh Thingujam 79'	Stadium: Rajamangala Stadium; Referee: Nasrullo Kabirov (Tajikistan)

26 June AFC U-17 Asian Cup QF	Japan	3–1	Australia	Pathum Thani, Thailand
17:00 UTC+7	Gaku Nawata 10'; Yutaka Michiwaki 23'; Rento Takaoka 74'	Report	Nestory Irankunda 62'	Stadium: Pathum Thani Stadium; Referee: Mongkolchai Pechsri (Thailand)

29 June AFC U-17 Asian Cup SF	Iran	0–3	Japan	Pathum Thani, Thailand
17:00 UTC+7		Report	Ryunosuke Yada 10'; Kohei Mochizuki 25'; Ryunosuke Sato 74'	Stadium: Thammasat Stadium; Referee: Nasrullo Kabirov (Tajikistan)

2 July AFC U-17 Asian Cup F	South Korea	0–3	Japan	Pathum Thani, Thailand
19:00 UTC+7		Report	Gaku Nawata 45+1', 66'; Yutaka Michiwaki 90+6'	Stadium: Pathum Thani Stadium; Referee: Mongkolchai Pechsri (Thailand)

8 August Balcom BMW Cup	U-18 Sanfrecce Hiroshima (Japan)	2–4	Japan	Hiroshima, Japan
16:00 UTC+9	Hagumu Nakagawa 17'; Alen Inoue 18'	Report	Katsuma Fuse 66'; Motoki Nishihara 70'; Own goal 73' (o.g.); So Yunoki 77'	Stadium: Hiroshima Regional Park No. 1 Ball Game Stadium

10 August Balcom BMW Cup	U-18 Hiroshima Prefecture HS (Japan)	2–4	Japan	Hiroshima, Japan
16:00 UTC+9	Yuga Arai 32'; Keita Okamoto 58'	Report	Tokumo Kawai 3'; Daichi Suzuki 8', 30'; Gota Yamaguchi 72'	Stadium: Hiroshima Regional Park No. 1 Ball Game Stadium

11 August Balcom BMW Cup	Japan	4–0	Uzbekistan	Hiroshima, Japan
15:00 UTC+9	Taiyo Yamaguchi 24'; Rento Takaoka 28'; Motoki Nishihara 64'; Rui Ageishi 76'	Report		Stadium: Hiroshima Regional Park No. 1 Ball Game Stadium

6 September Limoges Tournament	Japan	1–3	Portugal	Limoges, France
15:00 UTC+2	Kaito Tsuchiya 42'	Report	João Fonseca 55'; João Infante 66', 90'	Stadium: Stade Beaublanc; Referee: Yassir Touil (France)

8 September Limoges Tournament	Japan	4–0	England	Limoges, France
15:00 UTC+2	Alen Inoue 9', 63'; Gakuto Kawamura 41'; Shotaro Shibata 90+3'	Report		Stadium: Stade Beaublanc

10 September Limoges Tournament	France	2–0	Japan	Limoges, France
18:00 UTC+2	Lambourde 4'; Tinces 90'	Report		Stadium: Stade Beaublanc

14 September International Youth Soccer in Niigata	Japan	2–3	Venezuela	Niigata, Japan
15:30 UTC+9	Keito Kumashiro 78' (pen.); Hiroki Nishikawa 90+4'	Report	David Martínez 2', 60'; Yiandro Raap 85'	Stadium: Niigata Athletic Stadium

16 September International Youth Soccer in Niigata	Japan	2–0	New Zealand	Niigata, Japan
15:30 UTC+9	Kantaro Maeda 26'; Umi Kajisa 43'	Report		Stadium: Niigata Athletic Stadium

18 September International Youth Soccer in Niigata	Japan	5–1	(Japan) Niigata Prefecture	Niigata, Japan
15:30 UTC+9	Kantaro Maeda 16'; Keito Kumashiro 19', 36', 90+1'; Sean Kotake 44'	Report	Takumi Yasuno 48'	Stadium: Denka Big Swan Stadium

11 November FIFA U-17 World Cup GS	Japan	1–0	Poland	Bandung, Indonesia
16:00 UTC+7	Rento Takaoka 77'	Report		Stadium: Jalak Harupat Stadium; Attendance: 4,961; Referee: Pierre Atcho (Gabon)

14 November FIFA U-17 World Cup GS	Japan	1–3	Argentina	Bandung, Indonesia
19:00 UTC+7	Rento Takaoka 50'	Report	Claudio Echeverri 5'; Valentino Acuña 8'; Agustín Ruberto 90+9'	Stadium: Jalak Harupat Stadium; Attendance: 12,324; Referee: João Pinheiro (Portugal)

17 November FIFA U-17 World Cup GS	Senegal	0–2	Japan	Bandung, Indonesia
16:00 UTC+7		Report	Rento Takaoka 62', 72'	Stadium: Jalak Harupat Stadium; Attendance: 5,079; Referee: Rade Obrenovic (Slovenia)

20 November FIFA U-17 World Cup R16	Spain	2–1	Japan	Surakarta, Indonesia
19:00 UTC+7	Quim Junyent 8'; Marc Guiu 74'	Report	Gaku Nawata 40'	Stadium: Manahan Stadium; Attendance: 8,587; Referee: Pierre Atcho (Gabon)

- Fixtures & Results (U-17 2023), JFA.jp
- Limoges Tournament, JFA.jp

==== U-16 ====
31 May U-16 International Dream Cup	Japan	1–2	United States	Hirono, Japan
15:00 UTC+9	Keito Kumashiro 90+4'	Report	Santiago Morales 60'; Sean Petrie 83'	Stadium: J-Village Stadium; Attendance: 175; Referee: Yoshikazu Matsuzawa (Japan)

2 June U-16 International Dream Cup	Japan	6–1	Nigeria	Hirono, Japan
15:00 UTC+9	Shuto Oishi 2'; Keito Kumashiro 17', 32'; Kento Hamasaki 66'; Kota Sekiguchi 78'; Yusei Shima 90'	Report	Azuka Alatan 50'	Stadium: J-Village Stadium; Attendance: 135; Referee: Ryo Munakata (Japan)

4 June U-16 International Dream Cup	Japan	4–2	Netherlands	Hirono, Japan
15:00 UTC+9	Yusei Shima 4'; Yuta Sugawara 10'; Kento Hamasaki 48'; Shuto Oishi 50'	Report	Lyfe Oldenstam 3'; Gino Verhulst 51'	Stadium: J-Village Stadium; Attendance: 700; Referee: Takahito Seta (Japan)

- Fixtures & Results (U-16 2023), JFA.jp

==== U-15 ====
1 September EAFF U15 Championship GS	Guam	0–26	Japan	Qingdao, China
15:00 UTC+8		Report; Report	Minato Hara 2', 20', 36', 45+1'; Naoto Ogawa 3'; Kei Urakawa 6', 22', 39', 45', 54'; Riku Fushihara 11'; Eita Sasaki 18', 40', 43'; Haru Nagano 47', 65'; Keita Kashu 48'; Haruto Yoshida 53', 73'; Ryojiro Nobushige 61', 62', 72', 82', 88'; Yuto Taka 78', 85'	Stadium: Qingdao Citizen Fitness Center Pitch No.2; Attendance: 30; Referee: Yang Yizhou (China)

3 September EAFF U15 Championship GS	Chinese Taipei	0–2	Japan	Qingdao, China
10:00 UTC+8		Report; Report	Yuto Taka 11'; Ryojiro Nobushige 21'	Stadium: Qingdao Citizen Fitness Center Pitch No.2; Attendance: 31; Referee: Maher Alali (Lebanon)

5 September EAFF U15 Championship GS	Japan	10–3	Hong Kong	Qingdao, China
10:00 UTC+8	Yuto Taka 34', 43', 45+1', 62'; Rei Otake 47', 90+2'; Kei Urakawa 54'; Minato Hara 73'; Eita Sasaki 77', 87'	Report; Report	Chin Yu Ho Jeffrey 10'; Yiu Tsz Leong 14'; Choi Long Hei 38'	Stadium: Qingdao Baisha Bay Football Center Pitch No.9; Attendance: 68; Referee: Maher Alali (Lebanon)

7 September EAFF U15 Championship SF	Japan	4–0	South Korea	Qingdao, China
10:00 UTC+8	Haruki Watanabe 27'; Minato Hara 33'; Yuto Taka 65'; Kei Urakawa 78'	Report; Report		Stadium: Qingdao Citizen Fitness Center Pitch No.2; Attendance: 26; Referee: Maher Alali (Lebanon)

8 September EAFF U15 Championship Final	China	0–0 (4–2 p)	Japan	Qingdao, China
19:00 UTC+8		Report; Report		Stadium: Qingdao Youth Stadium; Attendance: 0 Referee: Maher Alali (Lebanon)

31 October Val de Marne Tournament	Japan	1–2	England	Val-de-Marne, France
14:00 UTC+2	Yuito Kamo 32'	Report	Goal 74', 80+3'	Stadium: Didier Pironi Sports Complex

2 November Val de Marne Tournament	Japan	3–1	Switzerland	Val-de-Marne, France
14:00 UTC+2	Minato Yoshida 41', 45'; Shohei Takemoto 59'	Report	Goal 46' (pen.)	Stadium: Maisons Rouges Sports Complex

4 November Val de Marne Tournament	France	3–1	Japan	Val-de-Marne, France
16:00 UTC+2	Ibrahim Mbaye 13'; Djylian N'Guessan 33' (pen.), 50'	Report	Hiroto Asada 43'	Stadium: Léo Lagrange Sports Complex

- Fixtures & Results (U-15 2023), JFA.jp
- EAFF U15 Men's Championship 2023, EAFF.com

==== Futsal ====
2 March NFDF Futsal Championship GS	Mozambique	0–5	Japan	Pattaya, Thailand
18:00 UTC+7		Report (JFA)	Mori 18', 38', 39'; Own goal 21'; Arthur 35'	Stadium: Eastern National Sports Training Center

3 March NFDF Futsal Championship GS	Japan	4–1	Thailand	Pattaya, Thailand
18:00 UTC+7	Kanazawa 7'; Shimizu 13'; Mizutani 25'; Nakamura 31'	Report (JFA)	Goal 34'	Stadium: Eastern National Sports Training Center

5 March NFDF Futsal Championship SF	Japan	1–0	Saudi Arabia	Pattaya, Thailand
20:15 UTC+7	Henmi 28'	Report (JFA)		Stadium: Eastern National Sports Training Center

7 March NFDF Futsal Championship F	Iran	4–1	Japan	Pattaya, Thailand
20:15 UTC+7	Goal 31', 33', 36', 39'	Report (JFA)	Tsutsumi 6'	Stadium: Eastern National Sports Training Center

14 April Friendly/Morocco Tour	Japan	2–3	Morocco	Rabat, Morocco
22:00 UTC+0	Antonio 18', 26'	Report	Goal 9', 12', 32'	Stadium: Prince Moulay Abdellah Stadium

15 April Friendly/Morocco Tour	Japan	0–3	France	Rabat, Morocco
18:00 UTC+0		Report	Goal 4', 26', 39'	Stadium: Prince Moulay Abdellah Stadium

17 April Friendly/Morocco Tour	Japan	1–0	Croatia	Rabat, Morocco
21:00 UTC+0	Henmi 8'	Report		Stadium: Prince Moulay Abdellah Stadium

13 September Futsal Nations Cup GS	Brazil	2–0	Japan	São Paulo, Brazil
20:30 UTC−3	Matheus 23'; Rafa 35'	Report		Stadium: Arena Sorocaba

15 September Futsal Nations Cup GS	Saudi Arabia	1–2	Japan	São Paulo, Brazil
15:00 UTC−3	Goal 33'	Report	Arthur 21'; Tsutsumi 33'	Stadium: Arena Sorocaba

16 September Futsal Nations Cup SF	Japan	0–2	Iran	São Paulo, Brazil
13:00 UTC−3		Report	Goal 33', 34'	Stadium: Arena Sorocaba

17 September Futsal Nations Cup 3rd place match	Japan	3–7	Paraguay	São Paulo, Brazil
07:00 UTC−3	Uchida 1'; Shimizu 3', 32'	Report	Goal 3', 6', 8', 17', 22', 32', 38'	Stadium: Arena Sorocaba

7 October AFC Futsal Asian Cup qual.	Australia	0–4	Japan	Taipei, Chinese Taipei
19:00 UTC+8		Report	Yoshikawa 9'; Arthur 13' (pen.), 33', 35'	Stadium: University of Taipei, Tianmu Campus Gymnasium

11 October AFC Futsal Asian Cup qual.	Japan	3–0	Chinese Taipei	Taipei, Chinese Taipei
19:00 UTC+8	Antonio 7'; Uchida 17', 33'	Report		Stadium: University of Taipei, Tianmu Campus Gymnasium

22 November International friendly	Uzbekistan	0–2	Japan	Tashkent, Uzbekistan
		Report		Stadium: Yunusobod Sport Complex

24 November International friendly	Uzbekistan	3–4	Japan	Tashkent, Uzbekistan
		Report		Stadium: Yunusobod Sport Complex

14 December International friendly	Japan	1–1	Argentina	Ota, Japan
19:00 UTC+9		Report		Stadium: Ota City General Gymnasium

17 December International friendly	Japan	1–1	Argentina	Obihiro, Japan
		Report		Stadium: Obihiro City General Gymnasium

- Fixtures & Results (2023), JFA.jp

==== U-23 futsal ====
31 January 2023 International friendly	France	3–4	Japan	Saint-Brice-sous-Forêt, France
20:00 UTC+1		Report (JFA); Report (JFA)	Harada 13'; Mori 15', 40'; Kanazawa 37'	Stadium: Centre Culturel et Sportif

1 February 2023 International friendly	France	1–6	Japan	France
		Report (JFA)

- Fixtures & Results (U-23 futsal 2023), JFA.jp

==== U-20 futsal ====
Unofficial results:

16 May F.League Ocean Cup	Japan U-19	0–2	(Japan) YSCC Yokohama	Hachioji, Japan
13:00 UTC+9		Report	Tsutsumi 13', 33'	Stadium: Ésforta Arena Hachiōji; Attendance: 302; Referee: Akane Yagi

- Fixtures & Results (U-19 futsal 2023), JFA.jp

==== Beach soccer ====
17 March AFC Beach Soccer Asian Cup GS	Japan	7–0	Indonesia	Pattaya, Thailand
18:30 TST (UTC+7)	Akaguma 2', 18'; Yamada 12', 23'; Ozu 21', 29'; Dwipayana 28' (o.g.)	Report		Stadium: Jomtiem Beach Arena; Referee: Suwat Wongsuwan (Thailand)

19 March AFC Beach Soccer Asian Cup GS	China	1–6	Japan	Pattaya, Thailand
18:30 TST (UTC+7)	Han Xuegeng 7'	Report	Yamauchi 9'; Shibamoto 9'; Oba 16'; Akaguma 23', 23'; Ito 36'	Stadium: Jomtiem Beach Arena; Referee: Fallah Al-Balushi (Oman)

21 March AFC Beach Soccer Asian Cup GS	Japan	9–3	Lebanon	Pattaya, Thailand
18:30 TST (UTC+7)	Oba 7', 29'; Akaguma 9', 31', 36'; Ozu 16'; Shibamoto 26'; Kibune 29'; Uesato 32'	Report	Al-Saleh 28', 36'; Haidar 34'	Stadium: Jomtiem Beach Arena; Referee: Waleed Mohamed Mahmood Abdulkarim (Bahrain)

23 March AFC Beach Soccer Asian Cup QF	Japan	8–0	Kuwait	Pattaya, Thailand
18:30 TST (UTC+7)	Akaguma 4', 11'; Kibune 5', 18'; Ozu 15', 32'; Shibamoto 28'; Matsuo 34'	Report		Stadium: Jomtiem Beach Arena; Referee: Fallah Al-Balushi (Oman)

25 March AFC Beach Soccer Asian Cup SF	United Arab Emirates	1–5	Japan	Pattaya, Thailand
18:30 TST (UTC+7)	Yaqoub 16' (pen.)	Report	Oba 2'; Yamada 10'; Akaguma 27', 32'; Yamauchi 35'	Stadium: Jomtiem Beach Arena; Referee: Abdulaziz Abdullah (Kuwait)

26 March AFC Beach Soccer Asian Cup F	Japan	0–6	Iran	Pattaya, Thailand
20:00 TST (UTC+7)		Report	Baltork 3'; Mirshekari 7', 36'; Mesigar 18'; Mokhtari 28'; Uesato 34' (o.g.)	Stadium: Jomtiem Beach Arena; Referee: Turki Al-Salehi (Oman)

26 May World Beach Games Qualif. SF	Japan	3–4	Iran	Jeddah, Saudi Arabia
19:15 UTC+3	Oba 2'; Akaguma 9', 27'	Report	Hassanabad 3'; Mesigar 13', 19', 33'	Stadium: Alhamra Beach Stadium; Referee: Hassan Abed Rabbo (Lebanon)

27 May World Beach Games Qualif. 3rd/4th	Saudi Arabia	3–6	Japan	Jeddah, Saudi Arabia
19:15 UTC+3	Al-Yami 13'; Shamhani 18'; Dakman 28'	Report	Ozu 6'; Matsuo 8'; Miyama 11', 21', 29'; Oba 19'	Stadium: Alhamra Beach Stadium; Referee: Waleed Mohamed Mahmood Abdulkarim (Bahrain)

14 October Friendly	Japan	6–1	Saudi Arabia	Sennan, Osaka
14:00 UTC+9	Kibune 5'; Oba 8', 9'; Yamada 24'; Furusato 29'; Otani 34'	Report	Tumayhi 18'	Stadium: Sennan Long Park Tarui Southern Beach; Attendance: 350; Referee: Suwat Songsuwan (Thailand)

15 October Friendly	Japan	5–1	Saudi Arabia	Sennan, Osaka
14:00 UTC+9	Otani 7'; Ozu 15'; Uesato 27'; Akaguma 31'; Kibune 32'	Report	Al-Duoasri 28'	Stadium: Sennan Long Park Tarui Southern Beach; Attendance: 550; Referee: Suwat Songsuwan (Thailand)

25 October Neom Beach Soccer Cup GS	Germany	2–4	Japan	Neom, Saudi Arabia
14:00 UTC+3	Petry 22'; Peterson 30'	Report	Ebener 3' (o.g.); Uesato 30'; Akaguma 34'; Yamada 34'	Stadium: Gayal Beach; Referee: Attila Balint (Romania)

26 October Neom Beach Soccer Cup GS	Japan	7–0	England	Neom, Saudi Arabia
17:00 UTC+3	Oba 1'; Ozu 5'; Miyama 9', 23'; Yamada 13'; Shibamoto 17'; Akaguma 31'	Report		Stadium: Gayal Beach; Referee: Abdulaziz Abdullah (Kuwait)

27 October Neom Beach Soccer Cup GS	Japan	5–1	Saudi Arabia	Neom, Saudi Arabia
21:00 UTC+3	Kibune 6', 15'; Akaguma 13'; Matsuda 15'; Yamada 23'	Report	Al-Duoasri 1'	Stadium: Gayal Beach; Referee: Ozcan Sultanoglu (Turkey)

28 October Neom Beach Soccer Cup; Final	Brazil	5–2	Japan	Neom, Saudi Arabia
20:00 UTC+3	Mauricinho 15'; Brendo 18', 25'; Catarino 21'; Edson Hulk 34'	Report	Yamauchi 10'; Kibune 17'	Stadium: Gayal Beach; Referee: Abdulla Saleh Qasim (Iraq)

2 November Friendly	Japan	4–1	Morocco	Dubai, United Arab Emirates
19:30 UTC+4	Miyama 7'; Oba 10', 44'; Matsuo 26'	Report	Goal 30' (pen.)	Stadium: UAEFA

- Fixtures & Results (2023), JFA.jp

=== Women's ===
==== Senior ====
11 April International friendly	Denmark	1–0	Japan	Odense, Denmark
18:00 UTC+2	Minami 7' (o.g.)	Report (JFA)		Stadium: Odense Stadium

14 July MS & AD Cup	Japan	5–0	Panama	Sendai, Japan
19:05 UTC+9	Shimizu 33'; Hasegawa 37', 61'; Fujino 60'; Minami 90+2'	Source		Stadium: Yurtec Stadium Sendai

22 July 2023 FIFA World Cup GS	Zambia	0–5	Japan	Hamilton, New Zealand
19:00 UTC+12		Report	Miyazawa 43', 62'; Tanaka 55'; Endō 71'; Ueki 90+11' (pen.)	Stadium: Waikato Stadium; Attendance: 16,111; Referee: Tess Olofsson (Sweden)

26 July 2023 FIFA World Cup GS	Japan	2–0	Costa Rica	Dunedin, New Zealand
17:00 UTC+12	Naomoto 25'; Fujino 27'	Report		Stadium: Forsyth Barr Stadium; Attendance: 6,992; Referee: Maria Sole Ferrieri Caputi (Italy)

31 July 2023 FIFA World Cup GS	Japan	4–0	Spain	Wellington, New Zealand
19:00 UTC+12	Miyazawa 12', 40'; Ueki 29'; Tanaka 82'	Report		Stadium: Wellington Regional Stadium; Attendance: 20,957; Referee: Ekaterina Koroleva (United States)

5 August 2023 FIFA World Cup R16	Japan	3–1	Norway	Wellington, New Zealand
20:00 UTC+12	Engen 15' (o.g.); Shimizu 50'; Miyazawa 81'	Report	Reiten 20'	Stadium: Wellington Regional Stadium; Attendance: 33,042; Referee: Edina Alves Batista (Brazil)

11 August 2023 FIFA World Cup QF	Japan	1–2	Sweden	Auckland, New Zealand
19:30 UTC+12	Hayashi 87'	Report	Ilestedt 32'; Angeldahl 51' (pen.)	Stadium: Eden Park; Attendance: 43,217; Referee: Esther Staubli (Switzerland)

23 September International friendly	Japan	8–0	Argentina	Kitakyushu, Japan
12:00 UTC+9	Tanaka 2'; Hasegawa 10', 39'; Takahashi 25'; Seike 61', 90+2'; Sugita 66'; Ueki 80'	Report (JFA)		Stadium: Kitakyushu Stadium; Attendance: 7,265; Referee: Oh Hyeon-jeong (South Korea)

26 October 2024 Olympic Qualifiers R2	Japan	7–0	India	Tashkent, Uzbekistan
15:00 UTC+5	Nakashima 17', 46'; Hayashi 53'; Tanaka 54'; Moriya 57'; Seike 73'; Naomoto 82'	Report		Stadium: Lokomotiv Stadium

29 October 2024 Olympic Qualifiers R2	Uzbekistan	0–2	Japan	Tashkent, Uzbekistan
17:00 UTC+5		Report	Minami 10'; Chiba 15'	Stadium: Bunyodkor Stadium

1 November 2024 Olympic Qualifiers R2	Japan	2–0	Vietnam	Tashkent, Uzbekistan
15:00 UTC+5	Shimizu 40'; Moriya 53'	Report		Stadium: Lokomotiv Stadium

30 November Friendly	Brazil	4–3	Japan	São Paulo, Brazil
15:15 UTC−3	Bia Zaneratto 41', 63'; Gabi Portilho 61'; Priscila 90+6'	Report	Fujino 38'; Endo 86' (pen.); Tanaka 88'	Stadium: Arena Corinthians; Referee: María Victoria Daza (Colombia)

3 December Friendly	Brazil	0–2	Japan	São Paulo, Brazil
11:00 UTC−3		Report	Minami 15'; Tanaka 18'	Stadium: Estádio do Morumbi

- Fixtures & Results (2023), JFA.jp

==== U-19 ====
16 May 2023 Sud Ladies Cup	Cameroon	0–3	Japan	Avignon, France
18:00 CET (UTC+1)		Report; Report (JFA)	Tanikawa 39'; Hiwatari 54'; Kurimoto 64'	Stadium: Parc des Sports, Avignon; Referee: Charlène Laur (France)

19 May 2023 Sud Ladies Cup	Japan	4–0	Panama	Avignon, France
17:00 CET (UTC+1)	Sasai 20'; Sakakibara 24'; Ujihara 37'; Nebu 90'	Report; Report (JFA)		Stadium: Parc des Sports; Referee: Élisa Daupeux (France)

21 May 2023 Sud Ladies Cup	France	0–7	Japan	Avignon, France
17:00 CET (UTC+1)		Report; Report (JFA)	Tanikawa 6', 86'; Sasai 22'; Kurimoto 56'; Ujihara 60', 82'; Ogawa 88'	Stadium: Parc des Sports; Referee: Yatzuri Muñoz (Panama)

- Fixtures & Results (WU-19 2023), jfa.jp

==== U-17 ====
17 March JENESYS U-17 Women’s Football Memorial Cup	Japan	4–0	Myanmar	Uruma, Japan
13:00 UTC+9	Riyo Sakuma 6'; Anon Tsuda 9', 22', 55'	Report		Stadium: Uruma City Gushikawa Sports Field

18 March JENESYS U-17 Women’s Football Memorial Cup	Japan	12–0	Philippines	Uruma, Japan
13:00 UTC+9	Riho Ito 3'; Rika Suzuki 24'; Momoka Honda 27'; Momo Saruang Ueki 35+1', 44'; Yuuna Takahashi 37'; Runa Ozawa 46'; Iori Watanabe 49', 56'; Mayuko Umezuki 54'; Noa Fukushima 72'; Anon Tsuda 73'	Report		Stadium: Uruma City Gushikawa Sports Field

20 March JENESYS U-17 Women’s Football Memorial Cup SF	Japan	5–0	Thailand	Uruma, Japan
13:00 UTC+9	Riho Ito 4'; Momo Saruang Ueki 11'; Noa Fukushima 50'; Yuzuki Kondo 69'; Anon Tsuda 70+2'	Report		Stadium: Uruma City Gushikawa Sports Field

21 March JENESYS U-17 Women’s Football Memorial Cup	Japan	12–0	Vietnam	Uruma, Japan
15:00 UTC+9	Rinka Suzuki 15'; Hana Ise 28', 35+1'; Mayuko Umezuki 38'; Momoka Honda 46'; Riyo Sakuma 50', 64'; Momo Saruang Ueki 56', 59', 66'; Yuma Suzuki 70+2'; Noa Fukushima 70+4'	Report

3 April Montaigu Tournament	Norway	0–4	Japan	Montaigu-Vendée, France
17:00 UTC+2			Mihiro Moteki 10', 36'; Kotomi Iwaki 76'; Tsubaki Hayashi 77'

5 April Montaigu Tournament	Japan	1–0	Mexico	Montaigu-Vendée, France
14:00 UTC+2	Kotomi Iwaki 25'	Report

7 April Montaigu Tournament	France	3–0	Japan	La Roche-sur-Yon, France
20:00 UTC+2	Goal 20', 57', 77'

9 April Montaigu Tournament F	Japan	1–1 (3–4 p)	Portugal	Montaigu-Vendée, France
16:30 UTC+2	Hana Kikuchi 10'		Goal 54'

22 September Friendly	United States	2–0	Japan	Carson, United States
13:00 UTC−7	Goal 12', 22'	Report		Stadium: Dignity Health Sports Park 3rd Field

24 September Friendly	United States	3–3	Japan	Carson, United States
13:00 UTC−7	Goal 14', 36', 48'	Report	Miharu Shinjo 3'; Kotomi Iwaki 5'; Suzuha Deshimaru 69'	Stadium: Dignity Health Sports Park 3rd Field

- Fixtures & Results (2023)

==== U-15 ====
6 August 2023 Balcom BMW CUP	Japan	2–2	(Japan) U-16 Hiroshima Prefecture	Hiroshima, Japan
15:30 UTC+9	Konoha Nakamura 28'; Sora Yamano 65'	Report (JFA)	Goal 16', 34'	Stadium: Edion Stadium Hiroshima

8 August 2023 Balcom BMW CUP	Japan	11–1	(Japan) U-16 Nagasaki Prefecture	Hiroshima, Japan
15:30 UTC+9	Yuna Takahashi 4'; Sao Uchida 26'; Akari Hoshino 32'; Sakura Oda 35+2'; Rinka Iwata 40'; Riu Nozaki 41', 46'; Sawa Shinden 47', 48', 66'; Sora Yamano 50'	Report (JFA)	Goal 52'	Stadium: Edion Stadium Hiroshima

9 August 2023 Balcom BMW CUP	Japan	11–0	(Australia) U-16 New South Wales	Hiroshima, Japan
17:00 UTC+9	Konoha Nakamura 4', 30', 39'; Sawa Shinden 15', 52'; Rinka Iwata 43', 60'; Sora Yamano 48', 50'; Momoka Sano 58'; Ayumu Makinose 62'	Report (JFA)		Stadium: Edion Stadium Hiroshima

- Fixtures & Results (2023)
- Fixtures & Results (W U-16 2023), JFA.jp

==== Futsal ====
3 September 2023 NSDF Women's Futsal Championship	Japan	8–0	Indonesia	Bangkok, Thailand
15:00 UTC+7		Report		Stadium: Terminal 21 Hall

5 September 2023 NSDF Women's Futsal Championship	Japan	8–0	China	Bangkok, Thailand
15:00 UTC+7		Report		Stadium: Terminal 21 Hall

7 September 2023 NSDF Women's Futsal Championship	Japan	9–1	Bahrain	Bangkok, Thailand
15:00 UTC+7		Report		Stadium: Terminal 21 Hall

9 September 2023 NSDF Women's Futsal Championship	Japan	5–2	Thailand	Bangkok, Thailand
17:00 UTC+7		Report		Stadium: Terminal 21 Hall

November 2023 Asian Indoor and Martial Arts Games GS	Japan	v	TBC	Bangkok or Chonburi, Thailand

- Fixtures & Results (W futsal), JFA.jp

== Club competitions ==
=== League (men) ===
==== Promotion and relegation ====
League	Promoted to league	Relegated from league
J1 League	Albirex Niigata ▲; Yokohama FC ▲	Shimizu S-Pulse ▼; Júbilo Iwata ▼
J2 League	Iwaki FC ▲; Fujieda MYFC ▲	FC Ryukyu ▼; Iwate Grulla Morioka ▼
J3 League	Nara Club ▲; FC Osaka ▲	No relegation
Japan Football League	Briobecca Urayasu ▲; Okinawa SV ▲	Kagura Shimane ▼ (Withdrawal)

==== J.League ====
===== J1 League =====
Pos	Team	Pld	W	D	L	GF	GA	GD	Pts	Qualification or relegation
1	Vissel Kobe (C)	34	21	8	5	60	29	+31	71	Qualification for the AFC Champions League Elite league stage
2	Yokohama F. Marinos	34	19	7	8	63	40	+23	64	Qualification for the AFC Champions League Elite league stage
3	Sanfrecce Hiroshima	34	17	7	10	42	28	+14	58	Qualification for the AFC Champions League Two group stage
4	Urawa Red Diamonds	34	15	12	7	42	27	+15	57	
5	Kashima Antlers	34	14	10	10	43	34	+9	52	
6	Nagoya Grampus	34	14	10	10	41	36	+5	52	
7	Avispa Fukuoka	34	15	6	13	37	43	−6	51	
8	Kawasaki Frontale	34	14	8	12	51	45	+6	50	Qualification for the AFC Champions League Elite league stage (Note: Qualified as the 2023 Emperor's Cup winners.)
9	Cerezo Osaka	34	15	4	15	39	34	+5	49	
10	Albirex Niigata	34	11	12	11	36	40	−4	45	
11	FC Tokyo	34	12	7	15	42	46	−4	43	
12	Hokkaido Consadole Sapporo	34	10	10	14	56	61	−5	40	
13	Kyoto Sanga	34	12	4	18	40	45	−5	40	
14	Sagan Tosu	34	9	11	14	43	47	−4	38	
15	Shonan Bellmare	34	8	10	16	40	56	−16	34	
16	Gamba Osaka	34	9	7	18	38	61	−23	34	
17	Kashiwa Reysol	34	6	15	13	33	47	−14	33	
18	Yokohama FC (R)	34	7	8	19	31	58	−27	29	Relegation to the J2 League

Source: Meiji Yasuda J1 League, J.League Data Site
Rules for classification: 1) Points; 2) Goal difference; 3) Goals scored; 4) Head-to-head points; 5) Head-to-head goal difference; 6) Head-to-head goals scored; 7) Fewer disciplinary points.
(C) Champions; (R) Relegated

===== J2 League =====
Pos	Team	Pld	W	D	L	GF	GA	GD	Pts	Promotion or relegation
1	Machida Zelvia (C, P)	42	26	9	7	79	35	+44	87	Promotion to the 2024 J1 League
2	Júbilo Iwata (P)	42	21	12	9	74	44	+30	75	Promotion to the 2024 J1 League
3	Tokyo Verdy (O, P)	42	21	12	9	57	31	+26	75	Qualification for the promotion play-offs
4	Shimizu S-Pulse	42	20	14	8	78	34	+44	74	Qualification for the promotion play-offs
5	Montedio Yamagata	42	21	4	17	64	54	+10	67	Qualification for the promotion play-offs
6	JEF United Chiba	42	19	10	13	61	53	+8	67	Qualification for the promotion play-offs
7	V-Varen Nagasaki	42	18	11	13	70	56	+14	65	
8	Ventforet Kofu	42	18	10	14	60	50	+10	64	
9	Oita Trinita	42	17	11	14	54	56	−2	62	
10	Fagiano Okayama	42	13	19	10	49	49	0	58	
11	Thespakusatsu Gunma	42	14	15	13	44	44	0	57	
12	Fujieda MYFC	42	14	10	18	61	72	−11	52	
13	Blaublitz Akita	42	12	15	15	37	44	−7	51	
14	Roasso Kumamoto	42	13	10	19	52	53	−1	49	
15	Tokushima Vortis	42	10	19	13	43	53	−10	49	
16	Vegalta Sendai	42	12	12	18	48	61	−13	48	
17	Mito HollyHock	42	11	14	17	49	66	−17	47	
18	Iwaki FC	42	12	11	19	45	69	−24	47	
19	Tochigi SC	42	10	14	18	39	47	−8	44	
20	Renofa Yamaguchi	42	10	14	18	37	67	−30	44	
21	Omiya Ardija (R)	42	11	6	25	37	71	−34	39	Relegation to 2024 J3 League
22	Zweigen Kanazawa (R)	42	9	8	25	41	70	−29	35	Relegation to 2024 J3 League

Source: Meiji Yasuda J2 League, J.League Data Site
Rules for classification: 1) Points; 2) Goal difference; 3) Goals scored; 4) Head-to-head points; 5) Head-to-head goal difference; 6) Head-to-head goal scored; 7) Fair-play points.
(C) Champions; (O) Play-off winners; (P) Promoted; (R) Relegated

===== J3 League =====
Pos	Team	Pld	W	D	L	GF	GA	GD	Pts	Promotion or relegation
1	Ehime FC (C, P)	38	21	10	7	59	48	+11	73	Promotion to the J2 League (Note: Only teams that hold a J2 license are eligible for promotion.)
2	Kagoshima United (P)	38	18	8	12	58	41	+17	62	Promotion to the J2 League
3	Kataller Toyama	38	19	5	14	59	48	+11	62	
4	FC Imabari	38	16	11	11	54	42	+12	59	
5	Nara Club	38	15	12	11	45	32	+13	57	
6	Gainare Tottori	38	14	14	10	57	52	+5	56	
7	Vanraure Hachinohe	38	15	11	12	49	47	+2	56	
8	FC Gifu	38	14	12	12	44	35	+9	54	
9	Matsumoto Yamaga	38	15	9	14	51	47	+4	54	
10	Iwate Grulla Morioka	38	15	9	14	48	49	−1	54	
11	FC Osaka (Note: The team does not hold either a J1 or J2 license, and so is ineligible for promotion to the J2 League.)	38	14	11	13	41	38	+3	53	
12	YSCC Yokohama	38	14	10	14	48	50	−2	52	
13	Azul Claro Numazu	38	15	6	17	48	48	0	51	
14	Nagano Parceiro	38	13	11	14	52	60	−8	50	
15	Fukushima United	38	12	11	15	37	42	−5	47	
16	Kamatamare Sanuki	38	11	11	16	29	45	−16	44	
17	FC Ryukyu	38	12	7	19	43	61	−18	43	
18	SC Sagamihara	38	9	14	15	44	48	−4	41	
19	Tegevajaro Miyazaki	38	9	12	17	31	52	−21	39	
20	Giravanz Kitakyushu	38	7	10	21	33	45	−12	31	

Source: Meiji Yasuda J3 League, J.League Data Site
Rules for classification: 1) Points; 2) Goal difference; 3) Goals scored; 4) Head-to-head points; 5) Head-to-head goal difference; 6) Head-to-head goal scored; 7) Fair-play points.
(C) Champions; (P) Promoted

==== Japan Football League (JFL) ====
Pos	Team	Pld	W	D	L	GF	GA	GD	Pts	Promotion, qualification or relegation
1	Honda FC (C)	28	15	8	5	51	26	+25	53	
2	Briobecca Urayasu	28	12	9	7	42	35	+7	45	
3	Reilac Shiga	28	11	11	6	47	37	+10	44	
4	Sony Sendai	28	11	10	7	46	40	+6	43	
5	ReinMeer Aomori	28	11	9	8	30	24	+6	42	
6	Verspah Oita	28	10	10	8	28	29	−1	40	
7	Kochi United	28	10	8	10	30	26	+4	38	
8	Maruyasu Okazaki	28	9	10	9	34	34	0	37	
9	Suzuka Point Getters	28	10	6	12	34	41	−7	36	
10	Veertien Mie	28	9	8	11	35	32	+3	35	
11	Criacao Shinjuku	28	10	4	14	25	33	−8	34	
12	Tiamo Hirakata	28	8	10	10	32	42	−10	34	
13	Tokyo Musashino United	28	9	5	14	30	36	−6	32	
14	Minebea Mitsumi	28	8	7	13	35	44	−9	31	
15	Okinawa SV (O)	28	7	5	16	18	38	−20	26	Qualification for relegation playoffs

Source: Japan Football League
Rules for classification: 1) Points; 2) Goal difference; 3) Goals scored; 4) Head-to-head points; 5) Head-to-head goal difference; 6) Head-to-head goal scored; 7) Fair-play points.
(C) Champions; (O) Play-off winners

=== League (women) ===
==== Promotion and relegation ====
League	Promoted to league	Relegated from league
WE League	No promotion	No relegation
Nadeshiko League Division 1		
Nadeshiko League Division 2		

==== WE League ====
Pos	Team	Pld	W	D	L	GF	GA	GD	Pts
1	Urawa Red Diamonds (C)	20	17	1	2	50	17	+33	52
2	INAC Kobe Leonessa	20	13	5	2	35	15	+20	44
3	Tokyo Verdy Beleza	20	12	6	2	47	22	+25	42
4	Mynavi Sendai	20	7	6	7	20	25	−5	27
5	Sanfrecce Hiroshima Regina	20	6	6	8	21	27	−6	24
6	Omiya Ardija Ventus	20	6	5	9	22	27	−5	23
7	AC Nagano Parceiro	20	5	6	9	21	25	−4	21
8	JEF United Chiba	20	4	8	8	21	27	−6	20
9	Nojima Stella Sagamihara	20	5	4	11	17	32	−15	19
10	Albirex Niigata	20	4	4	12	18	29	−11	16
11	AS Elfen Saitama	20	5	1	14	15	41	−26	16

Source: WE League
Rules for classification: 1) Points; 2) Goal difference; 3) Number of goals scored.
(C) Champions

==== Nadeshiko League ====
===== Division 1 =====
Pos	Team	Pld	W	D	L	GF	GA	GD	Pts
1	Yokohama FC Seagulls	11	8	2	1	22	11	+11	26
2	Orca Kamogawa	11	7	2	2	20	9	+11	23
3	NGU Loveledge Nagoya	11	6	2	3	18	10	+8	20
4	Iga Kunoichi Mie	11	5	4	2	20	7	+13	19
5	AS Harima Albion	11	5	4	2	16	14	+2	19
6	Sfida Setagaya	11	4	5	2	16	11	+5	17
7	Nittaidai	11	4	3	4	18	15	+3	15
8	Ehime FC	11	2	5	4	12	16	−4	11
9	Bunnys Gunma	11	2	5	4	12	17	−5	11
10	Shizuoka SSU Bonita	11	2	2	7	12	22	−10	8
11	Yamato Sylphid	11	2	2	7	11	33	−22	8
12	Speranza Osaka	11	1	0	10	9	21	−12	3

Updated to match(es) played on 28 May 2023. Source: Nadeshiko League
Rules for classification: 1) Points; 2) Goal difference; 3) Number of goals scored; 4) Head-to-head points; 5) Head-to-head goal difference; 6) Head-to-head away goals scored

===== Division 2 =====
Pos	Team	Pld	W	D	L	GF	GA	GD	Pts
1	Viamaterras Miyazaki	10	8	2	0	44	4	+40	26
2	JFA Academy Fukushima	10	6	2	2	17	6	+11	20
3	Fukuoka J. Anclas	10	6	2	2	10	13	−3	20
4	Okayama Yunogo Belle	10	4	3	3	28	16	+12	15
5	Tsukuba FC	10	4	2	4	13	14	−1	14
6	FC Fujizakura Yamanashi	10	3	4	3	10	10	0	13
7	Veertien Mie	10	3	3	4	7	9	−2	12
8	KIU Charme	10	2	4	4	12	15	−3	10
9	Diavorosso Hiroshima	10	1	3	6	3	31	−28	6
10	Norddea Hokkaido	10	0	1	9	2	28	−26	1

Updated to match(es) played on 4 June 2023. Source: Nadeshiko League
Rules for classification: 1) Points; 2) Goal difference; 3) Number of goals scored; 4) Head-to-head points; 5) Head-to-head goal difference; 6) Head-to-head away goals scored

=== Cup competitions (men) ===
==== Fujifilm Super Cup ====
11 February 2023
13:35 JST

Yokohama F. Marinos	2–1	Ventforet Kofu
Élber 30'; Nishimura 61'	JLeague.co (EN); JLeague.jp (JA)	Utaka 44'

Japan National Stadium
Attendance: 50,923
Referee: Yusuke Araki

==== J.League YBC Levain Cup ====
- Qualified teams:

League	Team	Final 2022 rank
2022 J1	Yokohama F. Marinos	1st
2022 J1	Kawasaki Frontale	2nd
2022 J1	Sanfrecce Hiroshima	3rd
2022 J1	Kashima Antlers	4th
2022 J1	Cerezo Osaka	5th
2022 J1	FC Tokyo	6th
2022 J1	Kashiwa Reysol	7th
2022 J1	Nagoya Grampus	8th
2022 J1	Urawa Red Diamonds	9th
2022 J1	Hokkaido Consadole Sapporo	10th
2022 J1	Sagan Tosu	11th
2022 J1	Shonan Bellmare	12nd
2022 J1	Vissel Kobe	13rd
2022 J1	Avispa Fukuoka	14th
2022 J1	Gamba Osaka	15th
2022 J1	Kyoto Sanga	16th
2022 J1	Shimizu S-Pulse (2023 J2)	17th
2022 J1	Júbilo Iwata (2023 J2)	18th
2022 J2	Albirex Niigata (2023 J1)	1st
2022 J2	Yokohama FC (2023 J1)	2nd

=== Cup competitions (women) ===
==== WE League Cup ====
1 October 2022
16:00 JST

Urawa Red Diamonds Ladies	3–3	Nippon TV Tokyo Verdy Beleza
Seike 75'; Ando 76'; Sugasawa 84'	Report (WE League)	Ueki 25', 29'; Muramatsu 72'
Penalties
Sugasawa (penalty scored); Shiokoshi (penalty scored); Naomoto (penalty scored); Seike (penalty scored)	4–2	(penalty scored) Ueki; (penalty scored) Utsugi; (penalty missed) Miura; (penalty missed) Fujino

Ajinomoto Field Nishigaoka, Kita, Tokyo
Attendance: 3,546
Referee: Asaka Koizumi
14 October 2023
16:03 JST

Sanfrecce Hiroshima Regina	0–0	Albirex Niigata
	Report (WE League)
Penalties
	4–2

Kawasaki Todoroki Stadium, Kawasaki, Kanagawa
Attendance: 6,261

== See also ==
- Japan Football Association (JFA)
