= 2024 FIFA Beach Soccer World Cup =

كأس العالم لكرة القدم الشاطئية 2024

Tournament details
- Host country: United Arab Emirates
- City: Dubai
- Dates: 15–25 February 2024
- Teams: 16 (from 6 confederations)
- Venue: 1 (in 1 host city)

Final positions
- Champions: Brazil (6th title)
- Runners-up: Italy
- Third place: Iran
- Fourth place: Belarus

Tournament statistics
- Matches played: 32
- Goals scored: 223 (6.97 per match)
- Attendance: 72,893 (2,278 per match)
- Top scorer(s): (Belarus) Ihar Bryshtel (12 goals)
- Best player: (Italy) Josep Jr. Gentilin
- Best goalkeeper: (Brazil) Tiago Bobô
- Fair play award: Portugal

The 2024 FIFA Beach Soccer World Cup was the 12th edition of the FIFA Beach Soccer World Cup, the premier international beach soccer championship contested by men's national teams of the member associations of FIFA. Overall, this was the 22nd edition of a world cup in beach soccer since the establishment of the Beach Soccer World Championships which ran from 1995 to 2004 but which was not governed by FIFA; all world cups took place annually until 2009 when it then became a biennial event.

This edition was originally set to be the 2023 FIFA Beach Soccer World Cup; at the FIFA Beach Soccer Workshop in November 2017, it was announced that the World Cup would continue to be held biennially in odd-numbered years for the period 2018–2024. The bidding process for said edition was subsequently opened by FIFA in October 2021, concluding with the selection of the United Arab Emirates as the hosts in December 2022. The tournament was initially set to take place from 16 to 26 November 2023. However, in June 2023, the tournament was postponed until 15 to 25 February 2024, in order to provide more time to the organisers to prepare for the event. As a consequence, its original 2023 branding was dropped, and it subsequently became referred to as the 2024 edition. It took place in Dubai, the second city to host in multiple times, (Note: Rio de Janeiro, Brazil hosted the first three editions in 2005, 2006 and 2007.) having also hosted the 2009 edition.

Russia won the previous edition (Note: Russia were the de facto defending champions, having competed as the RFU in 2021; in accordance with the ban by the World Anti-Doping Agency (WADA) and a December 2020 decision by the Court of Arbitration for Sport (CAS), the team from Russia was not permitted to use the Russian name, flag, or anthem at the 2021 FIFA Beach Soccer World Cup and competed as the team of the Russian Football Union (RFU), and used the flag of the Russian Olympic Committee.) and should have therefore been the defending champions. However, all Russian national teams are currently banned indefinitely from competing in FIFA competitions, due to the country’s invasion of Ukraine. The tournament was won by Brazil, who claimed their sixth FIFA Beach Soccer World Cup title, beating Italy in the final who finished as runners-up for a third time.

== Host selection ==
The original bidding schedule to determine the hosts was as follows:

- 6 October 2021 – FIFA opens the bidding process.
- 29 October 2021 – Deadline for national associations to declare interest of hosting to FIFA.
- 1 November 2021 – FIFA circulates documents detailing the application campaign and conditions of participation to the bidding associations to analyse.
- 26 November 2021 – Deadline for associations to reaffirm their bidding intentions by agreeing to the terms of the documents.
- 30 January 2022 – Deadline for nations to prepare and submit their complete bidding packages to be evaluated by FIFA.
- 31 March 2022 – Hosts announced by FIFA.

On 8 December 2021, FIFA revealed that five associations had affirmed their bidding intentions:

- Bahrain (Bahrain Football Association)
- Colombia (Colombian Football Federation)
- Seychelles (Seychelles Football Federation)
- Thailand (Football Association of Thailand)
- United Arab Emirates (United Arab Emirates Football Association)

On 14 February 2022, FIFA announced that three of the five associations had submitted bids through to the final stage of the process, with Colombia and Thailand withdrawing.

Confirmation of the awarding of hosting rights was due to be announced at the FIFA Council meeting in Doha, Qatar on 31 March 2022. However, no announcement was made; it was then due to be awarded at its meeting in Auckland, New Zealand on 22 October 2022, but it was announced at the meeting that the decision had been deferred again until a subsequent Council meeting. At the next Council meeting on 16 December 2022, in Doha, Qatar, the United Arab Emirates was awarded the hosting rights to the 2023 tournament.

== Qualification ==
A total of 16 teams qualified for the final tournament. In addition to the United Arab Emirates who qualified automatically as the host country, 15 other teams qualified from six separate continental competitions. The slot allocation was approved by the FIFA Council on 14 March 2023.

The process of qualification to the World Cup finals began in October 2022 and ended in August 2023.

Note: The appearance statistics below refer only to the FIFA era of world cups in beach soccer (since 2005); see this article for the inclusion of World Championships era stats (1995–2004).

Confederation	Qualified through	Team	App	Last	Best performance
AFC (Asia; 3 teams + hosts)	Host nation	United Arab Emirates	8th	2021	Group stage (seven times)
AFC (Asia; 3 teams + hosts)	2023 AFC Beach Soccer Asian Cup	Iran	8th	2017	Third place (2017)
AFC (Asia; 3 teams + hosts)	2023 AFC Beach Soccer Asian Cup	Japan	12th	2021	Runners-up (2021)
AFC (Asia; 3 teams + hosts)	2023 AFC Beach Soccer Asian Cup	Oman	5th	2021	Group stage (2011, 2015, 2019, 2021)
CAF (Africa; 2 teams)	2022 Africa Beach Soccer Cup of Nations	Egypt	1st	n/a	Debut
CAF (Africa; 2 teams)	2022 Africa Beach Soccer Cup of Nations	Senegal	9th	2021	Fourth place (2021)
CONCACAF (Central, North America and Caribbean; 2 teams)	2023 CONCACAF Beach Soccer Championship	Mexico	7th	2019	Runners-up (2007)
CONCACAF (Central, North America and Caribbean; 2 teams)	2023 CONCACAF Beach Soccer Championship	United States	7th	2021	Group stage (six times)
CONMEBOL (South America; 3 teams)	2023 Copa América de Beach Soccer	Argentina	9th	2015	Quarter-finals (2005, 2006, 2008, 2013)
CONMEBOL (South America; 3 teams)	2023 Copa América de Beach Soccer	Brazil	12th	2021	Champions (2006, 2007, 2008, 2009, 2017)
CONMEBOL (South America; 3 teams)	2023 Copa América de Beach Soccer	Colombia	1st	n/a	Debut
OFC (Oceania; 1 team)	2023 OFC Beach Soccer Nations Cup	Tahiti	7th	2021	Runners-up (2015, 2017)
UEFA (Europe; 4 teams)	2023 FIFA Beach Soccer World Cup qualification (UEFA)	Belarus	3rd	2021	Group stage (2019, 2021)
UEFA (Europe; 4 teams)	2023 FIFA Beach Soccer World Cup qualification (UEFA)	Italy	9th	2019	Runners-up (2008, 2019)
UEFA (Europe; 4 teams)	2023 FIFA Beach Soccer World Cup qualification (UEFA)	Portugal	11th	2021	Champions (2015, 2019)
UEFA (Europe; 4 teams)	2023 FIFA Beach Soccer World Cup qualification (UEFA)	Spain	9th	2021	Runners-up (2013)

1. Note ESP: Ukraine originally qualified. However, on 27 September 2023, it was announced that the Ministry of Youth and Sports of Ukraine had refused to sanction the Ukrainian national team's participation in the tournament, in protest at the Belarus national team being allowed to compete, which it believes should be barred from entering due the country's role in the Russian invasion of Ukraine. Ukraine previously qualified for, but also boycotted the 2021 World Cup due to its venue being in Russia. They were replaced by Spain, who statistically finished in fifth place in the UEFA qualifiers and therefore enter as lucky losers.

== Venue ==
Location of the Design District Stadium in Dubai, where the tournament was held.

One venue was used in the city of Dubai. Despite being a coastal city with beaches, the stadium was located within the city's inland Design District; it was known by the name, Dubai Design District Stadium. It hosted all 32 matches of the competition, with a capacity to accommodate almost 3,500 spectators. (Note: Note that multiple match reports reported an actual maxed out capacity crowd of 3,458.) The stadium was a temporary construction built purposely for the competition; its construction took just 25 days compared with typical lengths of 60 to 90 days.

== Draw ==
The draw to split the 16 teams into four groups of four took place at 18:30 GST (UTC+4) on 6 October 2023 at the Mohammed Bin Rashid Library in Dubai. The drawing of lots was performed by Bakhit Saad and Christian Karembeu. It was conducted under the following procedure:

The teams were first divided into four pots of four based upon a ranking created by FIFA considering each team's performances at the World Cup over the past five editions (since 2013); the more recent the tournament, the more weight was given to those results. Bonus points were also awarded to the teams that won their confederation's championship during qualifying. Using this ranking, the best-performing teams were placed in Pot 1 (plus the hosts), the next best performers were placed in Pot 2 and so on. This resulted in the following composition pots:

Pot 1	Pot 2	Pot 3	Pot 4
United Arab Emirates (Hosts; assigned to A1) (10); Brazil (Highest-ranked; assigned to D1) (1); Tahiti (18); Japan (6)	Italy (9); Senegal (7); Portugal (2); Iran (8)	Spain (4); Oman (17); United States (13); Belarus (22)	Argentina (14); Mexico (21); Colombia (11); Egypt (24)

The numbers in parentheses show the BSWW World Ranking of the teams at the time of the draw, out of 102 nations. The rankings are displayed for context only; it had no influence on the draw.

The draw started with Pot 1. As the hosts, the United Arab Emirates were automatically assigned to position A1. The highest-ranked team, Brazil, was automatically assigned to position D1. The other teams were then drawn – the first out was placed into Group B and the second, C. The teams from Pot 2 were then drawn – the first out was placed into Group A, second into B and so on. The same was repeated for Pots 3 and 4. The exact positions in the groups the teams were allocated to was determined by the drawing of lots from an auxiliary pot. Teams from the same confederation could not be drawn into the same group.

The draw resulted in the following groups:

Group A
Pos	Team
A1	United Arab Emirates
A2	Egypt
A3	United States
A4	Italy

Group B
Pos	Team
B1	Spain
B2	Iran
B3	Tahiti
B4	Argentina

Group C
Pos	Team
C1	Senegal
C2	Belarus
C3	Colombia
C4	Japan

Group D
Pos	Team
D1	Brazil
D2	Oman
D3	Portugal
D4	Mexico

== Match officials ==
From the International Referees List, FIFA chose 24 officials from 24 different countries to adjudicate matches at the World Cup, who were revealed on 14 December 2023.

At least one referee represented each of the six confederations of FIFA: four from the AFC, three from CAF, five from CONMEBOL, three from CONCACAF, one from the OFC, and eight from UEFA.

Confederation	Referee	Age	Qualified
AFC	(Kuwait Football Association) Abdulaziz Abdullah	48	2009
AFC	(Oman Football Association) Turki Al Salehi	47	2009
AFC	(Japan Football Association) Yuichi Hatano	42	2015
AFC	(United Arab Emirates Football Association) Ibrahim Alreesi	39	2017
CAF	(Mauritius Football Association) Louis Siave	35	2016
CAF	(Nigeria Football Federation) Jelili Ogunmuyiwa	44	2008
CAF	(Malagasy Football Federation) Said Hachim	44	2010
CONCACAF	(Dominican Football Federation) Juan Angeles	44	2012
CONCACAF	(Panamanian Football Federation) Gumercindo Batista	44	2012
CONCACAF	(Salvadoran Football Federation) Gonzalo Carballo	41	2014
CONMEBOL	(Colombian Football Federation) Jorge Gómez	37	2016
CONMEBOL	(Brazilian Football Confederation) Lucas Estevão	38	2017
CONMEBOL	(Uruguayan Football Association) Aecio Fernández	40	2018
CONMEBOL	(Peruvian Football Federation) Mickie Palomino	42	2012
CONMEBOL	(Argentine Football Association) Mariano Romo	42	2013

Confederation	Referee	Age	Qualified
OFC	(Tahitian Football Federation) Aurélien Planchais-Godefroy	42	2018
UEFA
UEFA	(Latvian Football Federation) Eduards Borisevics	41	2008
UEFA	(Bulgarian Football Union) Vladimir Tashkov	36	2016
UEFA	(Royal Spanish Football Federation) Francisco Bumedien	32	2018
UEFA	(Portuguese Football Federation) Sérgio Soares	44	2014
UEFA	(Lithuanian Football Federation) Vitalij Gomolko	34	2015
UEFA	(Association of Football Federations of Azerbaijan) Ingilab Mammadov	40	2012
UEFA	(Italian Football Federation) Saverio Bottalico	42	2017
UEFA	(Polish Football Association) Łukasz Ostrowski	38	2012

== Squads ==
Each team had to name a preliminary squad of between 12 and 18 players. From the preliminary squad, the team had to name a final squad of 12 players (two of whom must have been goalkeepers) by the FIFA deadline. Players in the final squad could be replaced by a player from the preliminary squad due to "serious" injury or illness up to 24 hours prior to kickoff of the team's first match.

The final squad lists were revealed by FIFA on 7 February 2024.

== Group stage ==
The match schedule was published on the 6 October, following the draw.

In the group stage, if a match is level at the end of normal playing time, extra time shall be played (one period of three minutes) and followed, if necessary, by kicks from the penalty mark to determine the winner. Each team earns three points for a win in regulation time, two points for a win in extra time, one point for a win in a penalty shoot-out, and no points for a defeat. The top two teams of each group advance to the quarter-finals.

Tiebreakers

The rankings of teams in each group are determined as follows:

1. points obtained in all group matches;
2. goal difference in all group matches;
3. number of goals scored in all group matches;

If two or more teams are equal on the basis of the above three criteria, their rankings are determined as follows:

4. points obtained in the group matches between the teams concerned;
5. goal difference in the group matches between the teams concerned;
6. number of goals scored in the group matches between the teams concerned;
7. fair play points in all group matches (only one deduction could be applied to a player in a single match):
  - Yellow card: −1 points;
  - Indirect red card (second yellow card): −3 points;
  - Direct red card: −4 points;
  - Yellow card and direct red card: −5 points;
8. drawing of lots by the FIFA Organising Committee.

All times are local, GST (UTC+4).

=== Group A ===
Pos	Team	Pld	W	W+	WP	L	GF	GA	GD	Pts	Qualification
1	Italy	3	2	0	0	1	9	3	+6	6	Knockout stage
2	United Arab Emirates (H)	3	1	1	1	0	5	3	+2	6	Knockout stage
3	Egypt	3	0	1	0	2	8	12	−4	2	
4	United States	3	0	0	0	3	7	11	−4	0	

Source: FIFA
Rules for classification: Tiebreakers
(H) Host
15 February 2024
15:30

United States	1–3	Italy
Rezende 11'	Report	Josep Jr. 2'; Zurlo 12'; Giordani 20'

Dubai Design District Stadium
Attendance: 711
Referee: Mariano Romo (Argentina)
Man of the match: Josep Jr. (Italy)
15 February 2024
19:30

United Arab Emirates	2–1	Egypt
W. Beshr 8'; Ali 15'	Report	Paulo 32'

Dubai Design District Stadium
Attendance: 2,253
Referee: Jorge Gómez (Colombia)
Man of the match: Waleed Beshr (UAE)

17 February 2024
15:30

Italy	6–2	Egypt
Sciacca 8'; Bertacca 12'; Miceli 15'; Josep Jr. 21'; Fazzini 25'; Giordani 35'	Report	Sasa 11', 17'

Dubai Design District Stadium
Attendance: 2,465
Referee: Aecio Fernández (Uruguay)
Man of the match: Josep Jr. (Italy)
17 February 2024
19:30

United Arab Emirates	3–2 (a.e.t.)	United States
Eid 16'; Abbas 24'; Ali 39' (e.t.)	Report	Toth 27'; Canale 36'

Dubai Design District Stadium
Attendance: 3,127
Referee: Vladimir Tashkov (Bulgaria)
Man of the match: Ali Mohammad (UAE)

19 February 2024
15:30

Egypt	5–4 (a.e.t.)	United States
Paulo 10', 11', 30'; Elshahat 33' (pen.); Taha 38' (e.t.)	Report	Canale 10', 16'; Collier 16'; Navas 24'

Dubai Design District Stadium
Attendance: 749
Referee: Eduards Borisēvičs (Latvia)
Man of the match: Hossam Paulo (Egypt)
19 February 2024
19:30

Italy	0–0 (a.e.t.)	United Arab Emirates
	Report
Penalties
Bertacca (penalty scored); Giordani (penalty missed); Fazzini (penalty missed); Josep Jr. (penalty missed)	1–3	(penalty scored) Haitham; (penalty scored) Kamal; (penalty scored) W. Beshr

Dubai Design District Stadium
Attendance: 3,305
Referee: Said Hachim (Madagascar)
Man of the match: Humaid Jamal (UAE)

=== Group B ===
Pos	Team	Pld	W	W+	WP	L	GF	GA	GD	Pts	Qualification
1	Iran	3	2	0	1	0	17	12	+5	7	Knockout stage
2	Tahiti	3	2	0	0	1	12	11	+1	6	Knockout stage
3	Argentina	3	1	0	0	2	11	14	−3	3	
4	Spain	3	0	0	0	3	13	16	−3	0	

Source: FIFA
Rules for classification: Tiebreakers
15 February 2024
17:00

Tahiti	4–3	Argentina
Salem 13', 31'; Li Fung Kuee 21'; Tiniraurii 30'	Report	Ponzetti 2', 32'; Pomar 34'

Dubai Design District Stadium
Attendance: 813
Referee: Vitalij Gomolko (Lithuania)
Man of the match: Jonathan Torohia (Tahiti)
15 February 2024
21:00

Spain	6–6 (a.e.t.)	Iran
D. Ardil 1', 10'; Chiky 7', 39' (e.t.); Kuman 18'; J. Arias 21'	Report	Mesigar 12'; Mokhtari 15', 22', 31' (pen.), 35'; Amiri 37' (e.t.)
Penalties
Antonio (penalty scored); Chiky (penalty missed); J. Arias (penalty missed); Pedro (penalty missed)	1–3	(penalty missed) Mokhtari; (penalty scored) Mirshekari; (penalty scored) Movahed; (penalty scored) Akbari

Dubai Design District Stadium
Attendance: 3,006
Referee: Jelili Ogunmuyiwa (Nigeria)
Man of the match: Mohammadali Mokhtari (Iran)

17 February 2024
17:00

Spain	3–5	Tahiti
J. Arias 3'; Batis 10'; Dona 15'	Report	Taiarui 17'; Tepa 23'; Labaste 23'; Tinirauarii 24', 36'

Dubai Design District Stadium
Attendance: 2,622
Referee: Mickie Palomino (Peru)
Man of the match: Heimanu Taiarui (Tahiti)
17 February 2024
21:00

Argentina	3–6	Iran
Medero 11', 34'; Holmedilla 18' (pen.)	Report	Mokhtari 4'; Behzadpour 7'; Amiri 11'; Moradi 34'; Mohammadpour 35'; Mirshekari 35'

Dubai Design District Stadium
Attendance: 3,458
Referee: Louis Siave (Mauritius)
Man of the match: Ali Mirshekari (Iran)

19 February 2024
17:00

Argentina	5–4	Spain
Holmedilla 18'; Rutterschmidt 18'; Ponzetti 29'; Pomar 32'; Medero 35'	Report	J. Arias 19'; Chiky 23', 29'; Kuman 36'

Dubai Design District Stadium
Attendance: 1,066
Referee: Yuichi Hatano (Japan)
Man of the match: Lucas Medero (Argentina)
19 February 2024
21:00

Iran	5–3	Tahiti
Behzadpour 24', 31'; Mirjalili 28'; Tehau 32' (o.g.); Mokhtari 35'	Report	Labaste 14'; Tinirauarii 22'; Tepa 32'

Dubai Design District Stadium
Attendance: 3,458
Referee: Sérgio Soares (Portugal)
Man of the match: Hamid Behzadpour (Iran)

=== Group C ===
Pos	Team	Pld	W	W+	WP	L	GF	GA	GD	Pts	Qualification
1	Belarus	3	3	0	0	0	13	6	+7	9	Knockout stage
2	Japan	3	2	0	0	1	10	9	+1	6	Knockout stage
3	Senegal	3	1	0	0	2	13	15	−2	3	
4	Colombia	3	0	0	0	3	6	12	−6	0	

Source: FIFA
Rules for classification: Tiebreakers
16 February 2024
15:30

Colombia	2–3	Japan
De Avila 22' (pen.); Pantoja 35'	Report	Akaguma 2'; Ozu 19'; Oba 26'

Dubai Design District Stadium
Attendance: 868
Referee: Gonzalo Carballo (El Salvador)
Man of the match: Yusuke Kawai (Japan)
16 February 2024
19:30

Senegal	4–6	Belarus
Samb 13'; Man. Diagne 20', 36'; Mendy 33' (pen.)	Report	Hapon 11' (pen.), 16', 31'; Bryshtel 13', 21'; Piatrouski 27'

Dubai Design District Stadium
Attendance: 1,004
Referee: Turki al Salehi (Oman)
Man of the match: Aleh Hapon (Belarus)

18 February 2024
15:30

Japan	1–3	Belarus
Kanstantsinau 3' (o.g.)	Report	Bryshtel 5'; Avgustov 20'; Drozd 23'

Dubai Design District Stadium
Attendance: 1,411
Referee: Lucas Estevão (Brazil)
Man of the match: Ihar Bryshtel (Belarus)
18 February 2024
19:30

Senegal	5–3	Colombia
Mam. Diagne 14'; Faye 19'; Mendy 29'; Ndoye 31'; Man. Diagne 36'	Report	López 2'; Ossa 8'; De Avila 27'

Dubai Design District Stadium
Attendance: 2,248
Referee: Abdulaziz Abdullah (Kuwait)
Man of the match: Mamour Diagne (Senegal)

20 February 2024
15:30

Belarus	4–1	Colombia
Ryabko 5'; Bryshtel 8', 18', 32'	Report	De Avila 36'

Dubai Design District Stadium
Attendance: 720
Referee: Ibrahim Alreesi (United Arab Emirates)
Man of the match: Ihar Bryshtel (Belarus)
20 February 2024
19:30

Japan	6–4	Senegal
Matsuo 16'; Matsuda 26', 32'; Oba 32', 35' (pen.); Ozu 35'	Report	Diatta 7'; Samb 14', 29'; Mam. Diagne 28'

Dubai Design District Stadium
Attendance: 2,511
Referee: Saverio Bottalico (Italy)
Man of the match: Takaaki Oba (Japan)

=== Group D ===
Pos	Team	Pld	W	W+	WP	L	GF	GA	GD	Pts	Qualification
1	Brazil	3	1	2	0	0	12	8	+4	7	Knockout stage
2	Portugal	3	2	0	0	1	13	7	+6	6	Knockout stage
3	Oman	3	1	0	0	2	10	10	0	3	
4	Mexico	3	0	0	0	3	7	17	−10	0	

Source: FIFA
Rules for classification: Tiebreakers
16 February 2024
17:00

Portugal	8–2	Mexico
Léo Martins 1', 9', 14', 32', 32'; Bê Martins 4'; Lourenço 11'; Jordan 12'	Report	Acevedo 26'; Maldonado 33'

Dubai Design District Stadium
Attendance: 1,172
Referee: Aurélien Planchais-Godefroy (Tahiti)
Man of the match: Léo Martins (Portugal)
16 February 2024
21:00

Brazil	5–3	Oman
Edson Hulk 3' (pen.), 29'; Mauricinho 6'; Catarino 11'; Rodrigo 12'	Report	Al Sauti 2'; Al Fazari 11'; K. Al Oraimi 15'

Dubai Design District Stadium
Attendance: 2,752
Referee: Ingilab Mammadov (Azerbaijan)
Man of the match: Tiago Bobô (Brazil)

18 February 2024
17:00

Mexico	2–5	Oman
Castillo 12'; Martínez 13'	Report	Al Muraiki 1', 27'; Al Hindasi 17'; Al Araimi 24'; K. Al Oraimi 29'

Dubai Design District Stadium
Attendance: 1,416
Referee: Łukasz Ostrowski (Poland)
Man of the match: Khalid Al Oraimi (Oman)
18 February 2024
21:00

Brazil	3–2 (a.e.t.)	Portugal
Rodrigo 6'; Catarino 18'; Mauricinho 38' (e.t.)	Report	Bê Martins 27'; Jordan 27'

Dubai Design District Stadium
Attendance: 3,458
Referee: Juan Angeles (Dominican Republic)
Man of the match: Mauricinho (Brazil)

20 February 2024
17:00

Oman	2–3	Portugal
Al Sauti 26'; K. Al Oraimi 36'	Report	Léo Martins 16', 36'; Jordan 20'

Dubai Design District Stadium
Attendance: 978
Referee: Mariano Romo (Argentina)
Man of the match: Khalid Al Oraimi (Oman)
20 February 2024
21:00

Mexico	3–4 (a.e.t.)	Brazil
Castillo 1'; Wbias 18'; Maldonado 35'	Report	Edson Hulk 7', 39' (e.t.); Mauricinho 11'; Alisson 31'

Dubai Design District Stadium
Attendance: 3,458
Referee: Francisco Bumedien (Spain)
Man of the match: Edson Hulk (Brazil)

== Knockout stage ==
21 and 23 February are allocated as rest days.

Quarter-finals
22 February
Iran	2
United Arab Emirates	1
22 February
Brazil	8
Japan	4
22 February
Italy	5
Tahiti	2
22 February
Belarus (a.e.t.)	4
Portugal	3

Semi-finals
24 February
Iran	2
Brazil	3
24 February
Italy (p)	3 (5)
Belarus	3 (4)

Final
25 February
Brazil	6
Italy	4
Third place match
25 February
Iran	6
Belarus	1

=== Quarter-finals ===
22 February 2024
15:30

Brazil	8–4	Japan
Alisson 2', 25'; Bruno Xavier 7'; Rodrigo 10'; Filipe Silva 20'; Brendo 20'; Edson Hulk 23'; Catarino 34'	Report	Yamada 27'; Oba 28', 33'; Kawai 29'

Dubai Design District Stadium
Attendance: 2,505
Referee: Juan Angeles (Dominican Republic)
Man of the match: Filipe Silva

22 February 2024
17:00

Belarus	4–3 (a.e.t.)	Portugal
Bryshtel 13', 14', 18' (pen.), 39' (e.t.)	Report	Algarvio 9'; Jordan 23'; B. Lopes 29'

Dubai Design District Stadium
Attendance: 2,293
Referee: Vladimir Tashkov (Bulgaria)
Man of the match: Ihar Bryshtel

22 February 2024
19:30

Iran	2–1	United Arab Emirates
Masoumi 17'; Mirjalili 23'	Report	Abdulla 14'

Dubai Design District Stadium
Attendance: 3,458
Referee: Sérgio Soares (Portugal)
Man of the match: Seyed Mirjalili

22 February 2024
21:00

Italy	5–2	Tahiti
Giordani 12', 17'; Bertacca 30'; Josep Jr. 34'; Remedi 35'	Report	Taiarui 3'; Tetauira 3'

Dubai Design District Stadium
Attendance: 1,901
Referee: Mariano Romo (Argentina)
Man of the match: Luca Bertacca

=== Semi-finals ===
24 February 2024
18:00

Iran	2–3	Brazil
Mirshekari 1'; Masoumi 13'	Report	Alisson 15' (pen.), 27'; Brendo 36'

Dubai Design District Stadium
Attendance: 3,458
Referee: Łukasz Ostrowski (Poland)
Man of the match: Alisson (Brazil)

24 February 2024
19:30

Italy	3–3 (a.e.t.)	Belarus
Josep Jr. 20'; Giordani 24'; Zurlo 31'	Report	Bryshtel 4', 30'; Novikau 9'
Penalties
Bertacca (penalty scored); Fazzini (penalty scored); Josep Jr. (penalty scored); Alla (penalty scored); Zurlo (penalty scored)	5–4	(penalty scored) Bryshtel; (penalty scored) Hardzetski; (penalty scored) Bokach; (penalty missed) Drozd; (penalty scored) Novikau

Dubai Design District Stadium
Attendance: 3,458
Referee: Mickie Palomino (Peru)
Man of the match: Josep Jr. (Italy)

=== Third place match ===
25 February 2024
18:00

Iran	6–1	Belarus
Mirshekari 2'; Movahed 3'; Moradi 14'; Amiri 14'; Masoumi 20'; Mokhtari 33'	Report	Chaikouski 34'

Dubai Design District Stadium
Attendance: 3,333
Referee: Aecio Fernández (Uruguay)
Man of the match: Reza Amiri (Iran)

=== Final ===
25 February 2024
19:30

Brazil	6–4	Italy
Rodrigo 12', 19', 29'; Bruno Xavier 21'; Genovali 23' (o.g.); Brendo 27'	Report	Genovali 4', 33'; Fazzini 19', 27'

Dubai Design District Stadium
Attendance: 3,458
Referee: Juan Angeles (Dominican Republic)
Man of the match: Rodrigo (Brazil)

== Awards ==
After the final, FIFA presented individual awards to the three best players of the tournament, three top goalscorers, and to the best goalkeeper. In addition, a collective award was given to the team with the most points in the Fair Play ranking. Following this, the winners' trophy was awarded to Brazil's captain, Datinha, by FIFA President, Gianni Infantino.

=== Winners ===
2024 FIFA Beach Soccer World Cup
Champions

Brazil
Sixth title
15th world title

=== Individual awards ===
The individual awards were all sponsored by Adidas, except for the FIFA Fair Play Award. The Golden, Silver and Bronze Balls were awarded by FIFA's Technical Study Group, which included current and former players Dejan Stankovic, Matteo Marrucci and Pascal Zuberbühler, and led by Arsene Wenger.

Golden Ball	Silver Ball	Bronze Ball
(Italy) Josep Jr. Gentilin	(Brazil) Mauricinho	(Belarus) Ihar Bryshtel
Golden Scorer	Silver Scorer	Bronze Scorer
(Belarus) Ihar Bryshtel (12 goals)	(Portugal) Léo Martins (7 goals; 4 assists)	(Iran) Mohammadali Mokhtari (7 goals; 1 assist)
Golden Glove
(Brazil) Tiago Bobô
FIFA Fair Play Award
Portugal

== Statistics ==
=== Goalscorers ===
There were 223 goals scored in 32 matches, for an average of 6.97 goals per match.

12 goals

- (Belarus) Ihar Bryshtel

7 goals

- (Portugal) Léo Martins
- (Iran) Mohammadali Mokhtari

6 goals

- (Brazil) Rodrigo

5 goals

- (Brazil) Alisson
- (Brazil) Edson Hulk
- (Italy) Marco Giordani
- (Japan) Takaaki Oba

4 goals

- (Egypt) Hossam Paulo
- (Italy) Josep Junior
- (Portugal) Jordan Santos
- (Spain) Chiky Ardil
- (French Polynesia) Roonui Tinirauarii

3 goals

- (Argentina) Lucas Medero
- (Argentina) Lucas Ponzetti
- (Belarus) Aleh Hapon
- (Brazil) Brendo
- (Brazil) Catarino
- (Brazil) Mauricinho
- (Colombia) Esleider Avila
- (Iran) Reza Amiri
- (Iran) Hamid Behzadpour
- (Iran) Mohammad Masoumi
- (Iran) Ali Mirshekari
- (Italy) Tommaso Fazzini
- (Oman) Khalid Al Oraimi
- (Senegal) Mandione Diagne
- (Senegal) Amar Samb
- (Spain) Jose Arias
- (United States) Alessandro Canale

2 goals

- (Argentina) Emiliano Holmedilla
- (Argentina) Manuel Pomar
- (Brazil) Bruno Xavier
- (Egypt) Moustafa Sasa
- (Iran) Seyed Mirjalili
- (Iran) Movahed Mohammadpour
- (Iran) Mohammad Moradi
- (Italy) Luca Bertacca
- (Italy) Gianmarco Genovali
- (Italy) Emmanuele Zurlo
- (Japan) Kosuke Matsuda
- (Japan) Ozu Moreira
- (Mexico) Cristofher Castillo
- (Mexico) Ramón Maldonado
- (Oman) Yahya Al Muraiki
- (Oman) Abdullah Al Sauti
- (Portugal) Bê Martins
- (Senegal) Mamour Diagne
- (Senegal) Raoul Mendy
- (Spain) David Ardil
- (Spain) Kuman
- (French Polynesia) Tearii Labaste
- (French Polynesia) Heirauarii Salem
- (French Polynesia) Heimanu Taiarui
- (French Polynesia) Patrick Tepa
- (United Arab Emirates) Abdulla Abbas
- (United Arab Emirates) Ali Mohammad

1 goal

- (Argentina) Axel Rutterschmidt
- (Belarus) Mikhail Avgustov
- (Belarus) Mikita Chaikouski
- (Belarus) Artsemi Drozd
- (Belarus) Yauheni Novikau
- (Belarus) Yury Piatrouski
- (Belarus) Anatoliy Ryabko
- (Brazil) Filipe Silva
- (Colombia) Edu Lopez
- (Colombia) Juan Ossa
- (Colombia) Julio Pantoja
- (Egypt) Ahmed Elshahat
- (Egypt) Elhusseini Taha
- (Iran) Moslem Mesigar
- (Italy) Alessandro Miceli
- (Italy) Alessandro Remedi
- (Italy) Fabio Sciacca
- (Japan) Takuya Akaguma
- (Japan) Yusuke Kawai
- (Japan) Naoya Matsuo
- (Mexico) Héctor Acevedo
- (Mexico) Diego Martínez
- (Mexico) Salomón Wbias
- (Mexico) Takahito Yamada
- (Oman) Mandhar Al Araimi
- (Oman) Abdulrahman Al Fazari
- (Oman) Yaqdhan Al Hindasi
- (Portugal) Duarte Algarvio
- (Portugal) Bernardo Lopes
- (Portugal) André Lourênço
- (Senegal) Ninou Diatta
- (Senegal) Ousseynou Faye
- (Senegal) Papa Ndoye
- (Spain) Soleiman Batis
- (Spain) Dona
- (French Polynesia) Raimana Li Fung Kuee
- (French Polynesia) Tamatoa Tetauira
- (United Arab Emirates) Waleed Beshr
- (United Arab Emirates) Rashed Eid
- (United States) Austin Collier
- (United States) Andres Navas
- (United States) Conner Rezende
- (United States) Chris Toth

1 own goal

- (Belarus) Ivan Kanstantsinau (vs. Japan)
- (Italy) Gianmarco Genovali (vs. Brazil)
- (French Polynesia) Teaonui Tehau (vs. Iran)

Source: BSWW

== Sponsorship ==
- (Germany) Adidas
- (United States) Coca-Cola
- Qatar Airways
- (South Korea) Hyundai
- (United States) Visa
- (China) Wanda Group
