= 2023 AFC Beach Soccer Asian Cup =

ฟุตบอลชายหาดเอเชียนคัพ 2023

Tournament details
- Host country: Thailand
- City: Pattaya
- Dates: 16–26 March
- Teams: 16 (from 1 confederation)
- Venue: Jomtien Beach Arena (in 1 host city)

Final positions
- Champions: Iran (3rd title)
- Runners-up: Japan
- Third place: Oman
- Fourth place: United Arab Emirates

Tournament statistics
- Matches played: 32
- Goals scored: 249 (7.78 per match)
- Top scorer: (Japan) Takuya Akaguma (11 goals)
- Best player: (Iran) Moslem Mesigar
- Best goalkeeper: (Iran) Seyedmahdi Mirjajili

The 2023 AFC Beach Soccer Asian Cup was the tenth edition (3rd official) of the AFC Beach Soccer Asian Cup (previously the AFC Beach Soccer Championship, before rebranding in 2021), the premier beach soccer tournament contested by Asian men's national teams, organised by the Asian Football Confederation (AFC).

The tournament took place in Pattaya, Thailand. The championship also acted as the qualification tournament for Asian teams for the 2023 FIFA Beach Soccer World Cup, to be held in the United Arab Emirates. The top three teams qualified for the World Cup, including the United Arab Emirates who automatically qualified as the host.

Japan were the defending champions, but lost to Iran in the final.

== Teams ==
A total of 16 teams entered the tournament.

Team	Appearance	Previous best performance
Afghanistan	4th	Group stage (2013, 2017, 2019)
Bahrain	9th	Champions (2006)
China	10th	4th place (2006, 2008)
Iran	10th	Champions (2013, 2017)
Indonesia	2nd	Group stage (2011)
Japan	10th	Champions (2009, 2011, 2019)
Kuwait	4th	Group stage (2011, 2015, 2019)
Kyrgyzstan	2nd	Group stage (2019)
Lebanon	5th	4th place (2015, 2017)
Malaysia	3rd	Quarter-finals (2019)
Oman	7th	Champions (2015)
Palestine	3rd	4th place (2019)
Saudi Arabia	2nd	Group stage (2013)
Thailand (hosts)	5th	Group stage (2013, 2015, 2017, 2019)
United Arab Emirates	9th	Champions (2007, 2008)
Uzbekistan	6th	Quarter-finals (2011, 2015)

== Draw ==
The draw of the tournament was held on 19 January 2023 in Kuala Lumpur, Malaysia. The 16 teams were drawn into four groups of four teams. The teams were seeded according to their performance in the 2019 AFC Beach Soccer Championship final tournament, with the hosts Thailand automatically seeded and assigned to Position A1 in the draw.

Pot 1	Pot 2	Pot 3	Pot 4
Thailand (hosts); Japan; United Arab Emirates; Oman	Palestine; Lebanon; Iran; Bahrain	Malaysia; China; Kuwait; Afghanistan	Kyrgyzstan; Indonesia; Saudi Arabia; Uzbekistan

== Group stage ==
=== Group A ===
Pos	Team	Pld	W	W+	WP	L	GF	GA	GD	Pts	Qualification
1	Thailand (H)	3	2	0	0	1	9	7	+2	6	Knockout stage
2	Bahrain	3	2	0	0	1	8	7	+1	6	Knockout stage
3	Saudi Arabia	3	1	0	1	1	10	10	0	4	
4	Afghanistan	3	0	0	0	3	10	13	−3	0	

Source: AFC
(H) Host
16 March 2023
17:00

Bahrain	4–2	Afghanistan
Jamal 1'; Yaqoob 19', 24'; Abdulrasool 27'	Report	T. Haidari 18', 25'

Jomtien Beach Arena, Pattaya
Referee: Abdulaziz Abdullah (Kuwait)
16 March 2023
20:00

Thailand	2–3	Saudi Arabia
Komkrit 3'; Suriya 17'	Report	Bawdah 2'; Al-Hamami 10'; Mo. Al-Shammari 24'

Jomtien Beach Arena, Pattaya
Referee: Shao Liang (China)

18 March 2023
17:00

Saudi Arabia	3–4	Bahrain
Yakl 27'; Safhi 32'; Bawdah 34'	Report	Al-Yaqoobi 8'; Ashoor 10'; Jamal 36'; Yaqoob 36'

Jomtien Beach Arena, Pattaya
Referee: Turki Al-Salehi (Oman)
18 March 2023
20:00

Afghanistan	4–5	Thailand
T. Haidari 11'; Himat 21'; Chalermchai 24' (o.g.); Homauni 35'	Report	Suriya 5'; Komkrit 2', 8'; Natee 9'; Ratthaphong 19'

Jomtien Beach Arena, Pattaya
Referee: Yuichi Hatano (Japan)

20 March 2023
17:00

Afghanistan	4–4 (a.e.t.)	Saudi Arabia
Farooq 16'; Rabani 17'; Mohammadi 21'; Jafari 24'	Report	Mo. Al-Shammari 2', 3'; Al-Hamami 6'; Al-Youbi 26'
Penalties
Mohammadi (penalty scored); Homauni (penalty missed); Farooq (penalty scored); T. Haidari (penalty missed)	2–4	(penalty scored) Bawdah; (penalty scored) Al-Hamami; (penalty missed) Tumayhi; (penalty scored) Dakman; (penalty scored) Al-Askah

Jomtien Beach Arena, Pattaya
Referee: Abdulaziz Abdullah (Kuwait)
20 March 2023
20:00

Thailand	2–0	Bahrain
Tanandon 19'; Watchara 36'	Report

Jomtien Beach Arena, Pattaya
Referee: Turki Al-Salehi (Oman)

=== Group B ===
Pos	Team	Pld	W	W+	WP	L	GF	GA	GD	Pts	Qualification
1	Iran	3	3	0	0	0	32	9	+23	9	Knockout stage
2	United Arab Emirates	3	2	0	0	1	11	10	+1	6	Knockout stage
3	Uzbekistan	3	1	0	0	2	8	17	−9	3	
4	Malaysia	3	0	0	0	3	10	25	−15	0	

Source: AFC
16 March 2023
15:30

Iran	14–5	Malaysia
Mesigar 1', 12'; Akbari 2'; Mirshekari 3' (pen.), 24'; Rezaei 5', 16'; Amiri 7'; Shirmohammadi 13', 29'; Baltork 14', 36'; Mokhtari 28'; Khosravi 36'	Report	Norazman 1'; Faisal 6'; Hasrol 18'; Qushairie 20'; Ridhwan 35'

Jomtien Beach Arena, Pattaya
Referee: Makoto Sato (Japan)
16 March 2023
18:30

United Arab Emirates	4–0	Uzbekistan
W. Beshr 9'; A. Beshr 16' (pen.), 21' (pen.); A. Mohammadi 24'	Report

Jomtien Beach Arena, Pattaya
Referee: Fallah Al-Balushi (Oman)

18 March 2023
15:30

Uzbekistan	2–11	Iran
Rasulov 18'; Mallaev 23'	Report	Mirshekari 2', 22'; Baltork 12', 15'; Mokhtari 13', 25', 35'; Amiri 19'; Mesigar 24', 32'; Shirmohammadi 34'

Jomtien Beach Arena, Pattaya
Referee: Li Qibin (China)
18 March 2023
18:30

Malaysia	3–5	United Arab Emirates
Norazman 25'; Hafizam 27'; Hasrol 33'	Report	A. Mohammadi 5', 28' (pen.); A. Beshr 7'; W. Beshr 20'; Al-Blooshi 31'

Jomtien Beach Arena, Pattaya
Referee: Abdulaziz Abdullah (Kuwait)

20 March 2023
15:30

Malaysia	2–6	Uzbekistan
Qushairie 9'; Zulhairi 16'	Report	Mallaev 3'; Khalimov 9', 21'; Kodirov 15'; Rasulov 20', 21'

Jomtien Beach Arena, Pattaya
Referee: Timur Gulmyradow (Turkmenistan)
20 March 2023
18:30

United Arab Emirates	2–7	Iran
W. Mohammadi 16', 18'	Report	Mirshekari 3'; Shirmohammadi 15', 24'; Baltork 19'; Mirjajili 20'; Moradi 26'; Mokhtari 32'

Jomtien Beach Arena, Pattaya
Referee: Yuichi Hatano (Japan)

=== Group C ===
Pos	Team	Pld	W	W+	WP	L	GF	GA	GD	Pts	Qualification
1	Japan	3	3	0	0	0	22	4	+18	9	Knockout stage
2	China	3	2	0	0	1	10	11	−1	6	Knockout stage
3	Lebanon	3	1	0	0	2	16	13	+3	3	
4	Indonesia	3	0	0	0	3	4	24	−20	0	

Source: AFC
17 March 2023
15:30

Lebanon	1–4	China
Haidar 4'	Report	Cai Weiming 28'; Li Yueming 30'; Liu Haoran 33', 34'

Jomtien Beach Arena, Pattaya
Referee: Turki Al-Salehi (Oman)
17 March 2023
18:30

Japan	7–0	Indonesia
Akaguma 2', 18'; Yamada 12', 23'; Moreira 21', 29'; Yamauchi 28'	Report

Jomtien Beach Arena, Pattaya
Referee: Suwat Wongsuwan (Thailand)

19 March 2023
15:30

Indonesia	0–12	Lebanon
	Report	Merhi 10', 18', 26'; El Khatib 12'; Bate 18' (o.g.); Al Saleh 19'; Mi. Matar 25'; Haidar 26'; Grada 27', 33'; Abdullah 30'; Me. Matar 36'

Jomtien Beach Arena, Pattaya
Referee: Nayim Kosimov (Uzbekistan)
19 March 2023
18:30

China	1–6	Japan
Han Xuegeng 7'	Report	Yamauchi 9'; Shibamoto 9'; Oba 16'; Akaguma 23', 23'; Ito 36'

Jomtien Beach Arena, Pattaya
Referee: Fallah Al-Balushi (Oman)

21 March 2023
15:30

China	5–4	Indonesia
Bai Fan 13', 18'; Cai Weiming 21'; Han Xuegeng 24'; Liu Haoran 24'	Report	Bate 6', 28'; Widnyana 9'; Dwipayudha 34'

Jomtien Beach Arena, Pattaya
Referee: Suwat Wongsuwan (Thailand)
21 March 2023
18:30

Japan	9–3	Lebanon
Oba 7', 29'; Akaguma 9', 31', 36'; Moreira 17'; Shibamoto 26'; Kibune 29'; Uesato 32'	Report	Al Saleh 28' (pen.), 36'; Haidar 34'

Jomtien Beach Arena, Pattaya
Referee: Waleed Abdulkarim (Bahrain)

=== Group D ===
Pos	Team	Pld	W	W+	WP	L	GF	GA	GD	Pts	Qualification
1	Oman	3	3	0	0	0	17	2	+15	9	Knockout stage
2	Kuwait	3	1	0	1	1	10	9	+1	4	Knockout stage
3	Palestine	3	1	0	0	2	4	12	−8	3	
4	Kyrgyzstan	3	0	0	0	3	6	14	−8	0	

Source: AFC
17 March 2023
17:00

Palestine	0–5	Kuwait
	Report	Mo. Al-Shafei 5'; Al-Enezi 21', 36'; Darweesh 24'; Al-Manaye 35'

Jomtien Beach Arena, Pattaya
Referee: Ibrahim Al-Raeesi (United Arab Emirates)
17 March 2023
20:00

Oman	7–0	Kyrgyzstan
Al Bulushi 14', 32'; Y. Al Owaisi 28'; Al Muraiki 29', 30'; K. Al Oraimi 34'; Al Hindasi 36'	Report

Jomtien Beach Arena, Pattaya
Referee: Hassan Abed (Lebanon)

19 March 2023
17:00

Kyrgyzstan	2–3	Palestine
Omorov 6'; Dordoshev 22'	Report	Hassan 6'; Atiya 16'; Al-Qaddi 31'

Jomtien Beach Arena, Pattaya
Referee: Suparith Udma (Thailand)
19 March 2023
20:00

Kuwait	1–5	Oman
Al-Rouqi 5'	Report	Al Muraiki 1'; Al Bulushi 8'; K. Al Oraimi 13', 14'; Al Sauti 28'

Jomtien Beach Arena, Pattaya
Referee: Ibrahim Al-Raeesi (United Arab Emirates)

21 March 2023
17:00

Kuwait	4–4 (a.e.t.)	Kyrgyzstan
Al-Enezi 1', 15'; Al-Rouqi 17' (pen.); Darweesh 36'	Report	Dzhailoobaev 11'; Usenbaev 14'; Ke. Mukaev 24'; Sodaliev 33'
Penalties
Al-Manaye (penalty missed); Mo. Al-Shafei (penalty missed); Al-Kandari (penalty scored); Al-Rouqi (penalty scored); Darweesh (penalty scored)	3–2	(penalty missed) Diushenov; (penalty scored) Muktarbekov; (penalty missed) Dzhailoobaev; (penalty missed) Kaiykbik Uulu; (penalty scored) Ke. Mukaev

Jomtien Beach Arena, Pattaya
Referee: Abdulla Saleh (Bahrain)
21 March 2023
20:00

Oman	5–1	Palestine
Al Sauti 14'; Mu. Al Araimi 17'; Ma. Al Araimi 21'; Al Hindasi 22'; Y. Al Owaisi 23'	Report	Jaber 3'

Jomtien Beach Arena, Pattaya
Referee: Syahir Shaharul (Malaysia)

== Knockout stage ==
=== Bracket ===
Quarter-finals
22 March
Thailand	2
United Arab Emirates	4
23 March
Japan	8
Kuwait	0
22 March
Iran	10
Bahrain	0
23 March
Oman	11
China	0

Semi-finals
25 March
United Arab Emirates	1
Japan	5
25 March
Iran	6
Oman	3

Final
26 March
Japan	0
Iran	6
Third place
26 March
United Arab Emirates	2
Oman	4

=== Quarter-finals ===
22 March 2023
18:30

Thailand	2–4	United Arab Emirates
Komkrit 19'; Tanandon 30' (pen.)	Report	Al-Blooshi 2'; Atus 18' (o.g.); A. Mohammadi 23', 35'

Jomtien Beach Arena, Pattaya
Referee: Abdulla Saleh (Bahrain)

22 March 2023
20:30

Iran	10–0	Bahrain
Mesigar 7', 14'; Moradi 9'; Mirjajili 15', 26'; Mokhtari 20'; Akbari 26'; Mirshekari 31'; Rezaei 32'; Al-Abdulla 35' (o.g.)	Report

Jomtien Beach Arena, Pattaya
Referee: Suwat Wongsuwan (Thailand)

23 March 2023
18:30

Japan	8–0	Kuwait
Akaguma 4', 11'; Kibune 5', 18'; Moreira 15', 32'; Shibamoto 28'; Matsuo 34'	Report

Jomtien Beach Arena, Pattaya
Referee: Fallah Al-Balushi (Oman)

23 March 2023
20:30

Oman	11–0	China
Mu. Al Araimi 2', 9'; Al Sauti 3', 23'; Al Bulushi 14', 34'; A. Al Owaisi 18', 20', 30'; Al Hindasi 29'; Ma. Al Araimi 32'	Report

Jomtien Beach Arena, Pattaya
Referee: Makoto Sato (Japan)

=== Semi-finals ===
25 March 2023
18:30

United Arab Emirates	1–5	Japan
Yaqoub 16' (pen.)	Report	Oba 2'; Yamada 10'; Akaguma 27', 32'; Yamauchi 35'

Jomtien Beach Arena, Pattaya
Referee: Abdulaziz Abdullah (Kuwait)

25 March 2023
20:30

Iran	6–3	Oman
Mokhtari 4' (pen.), 18'; Moradi 7'; Rezaei 20'; Mirshekari 21'; Akbari 30'	Report	Al Bulushi 4'; K. Al Oraimi 11'; Mesigar 22' (o.g.)

Jomtien Beach Arena, Pattaya
Referee: Hassan Abed (Lebanon)

=== Third-place match ===
26 March 2023
18:30

United Arab Emirates	2–4	Oman
Yaqoub 1', 24'	Report	K. Al Oraimi 13'; Al Muraiki 21' (pen.); Al Bulushi 25', 26'

Jomtien Beach Arena, Pattaya
Referee: Yuichi Hatano (Japan)

=== Final ===
26 March 2023
20:30

Japan	0–6	Iran
	Report	Baltork 3'; Mirshekari 7', 36'; Mesigar 18'; Mokhtari 28'; Uesato 34' (o.g.)

Jomtien Beach Arena, Pattaya
Referee: Turki Al-Salehi (Oman)

== Goalscorers ==
There were 249 goals scored in 32 matches, for an average of 7.78 goals per match.

11 goals

- (Japan) Takuya Akaguma

9 goals

- (Iran) Ali Mirshekari
- (Iran) Mohammadali Mokhtari

8 goals

- (Oman) Sami Al Bulushi

7 goals

- (Iran) Moslem Mesigar

6 goals

- (Iran) Movahed Baltork

5 goals

- (Iran) Mahdi Shirmohammadi
- (Japan) Ozu Moreira
- (Oman) Khalid Al Oraimi
- (United Arab Emirates) Ali Mohammadi

4 goals

- (Iran) Abbas Rezaei
- (Japan) Takaaki Oba
- (Kuwait) Majed Al-Enezi
- (Oman) Yahya Al Muraiki
- (Oman) Abdullah Al Sauti
- (Thailand) Komkrit Nanan

3 goals

- (Afghanistan) Tamim Haidari
- (Bahrain) Mohamed Yaqoob
- (China) Liu Haoran
- (Iran) Amir Akbari
- (Iran) Seyedmahdi Mirjajili
- (Iran) Mohammad Moradi
- (Japan) Yuki Kibune
- (Japan) Shinya Shibamoto
- (Japan) Takahito Yamada
- (Lebanon) Mohamad Haidar
- (Lebanon) Mohamad Merhi
- (Lebanon) Mohammad Al Saleh
- (Oman) Mushel Al Araimi
- (Oman) Al Yaqdhan Al Hindasi
- (Oman) Ahmed Al Owaisi
- (Saudi Arabia) Mohammed Al-Shammari
- (United Arab Emirates) Ahmed Beshr
- (United Arab Emirates) Rashed Yaqoub
- (Uzbekistan) Jamshid Rasulov

2 goals

- (Bahrain) Rashad Jamal
- (China) Bai Fan
- (China) Cai Weiming
- (China) Han Xuegeng
- (Indonesia) Junius Bate
- (Iran) Reza Amiri
- (Japan) Shusei Yamauchi
- (Kuwait) Mohammad Darweesh
- (Kuwait) Omar Al-Rouqi
- (Lebanon) Ahmed Grada
- (Malaysia) Hasrol Ali
- (Malaysia) Norazman Bakar
- (Malaysia) Qushairie Asaari
- (Oman) Mandhar Al Araimi
- (Oman) Younis Al Owaisi
- (Saudi Arabia) Belal Bawdah
- (Saudi Arabia) Ahmed Al-Hamami
- (Thailand) Suriya Boridet
- (Thailand) Tanandon Praracha
- (United Arab Emirates) Waleed Beshr
- (United Arab Emirates) Abdulla Al-Blooshi
- (United Arab Emirates) Walid Mohammadi
- (Uzbekistan) Mamasharif Khalimov
- (Uzbekistan) Ilyos Mallaev

1 goal

- (Afghanistan) Ramez Farooq
- (Afghanistan) Abdul Nafi Himat
- (Afghanistan) Omid Homauni
- (Afghanistan) Murtaza Jafari
- (Afghanistan) Sami Ullah Mohammadi
- (Afghanistan) Ahmad Rabani
- (Bahrain) Ahmed Abdulrasool
- (Bahrain) Mohamed Ashoor
- (Bahrain) Salman Al-Yaqoobi
- (China) Li Yueming
- (Indonesia) Dewa Dwipayudha
- (Indonesia) Nyoman Widnyana
- (Iran) Javad Khosravi
- (Japan) Ryunosuke Ito
- (Japan) Naoya Matsuo
- (Japan) Takumi Uesato
- (Kuwait) Faisal Al-Manaye
- (Kuwait) Mohammad Al-Shafei
- (Kyrgyzstan) Erzhan Dordoshev
- (Kyrgyzstan) Almaz Dzhailoobaev
- (Kyrgyzstan) Keldibek Mukaev
- (Kyrgyzstan) Beksultan Omorov
- (Kyrgyzstan) Roman Sodaliev
- (Kyrgyzstan) Beksultan Usenbaev
- (Lebanon) Hussein Abdullah
- (Lebanon) Ahmad El Khatib
- (Lebanon) Mechleb Matar
- (Lebanon) Michlib Matar
- (Malaysia) Faisal Saharudin
- (Malaysia) Hafizam Rahman
- (Malaysia) Ridhwan Zainal
- (Malaysia) Zulhairi Ismail
- (Palestine) Alaa Atiya
- (Palestine) Mohammed Hassan
- (Palestine) Fady Jaber
- (Palestine) Mohammed Al-Qaddi
- (Saudi Arabia) Al-Waleed Safhi
- (Saudi Arabia) Naif Yakl
- (Saudi Arabia) Waleed Al-Youbi
- (Thailand) Natee Jeepon
- (Thailand) Ratthaphong Nadee
- (Thailand) Watchara Lepaijit
- (Uzbekistan) Farhod Kodirov

1 own goal

- (Bahrain) Abdulla Al-Abdulla (against Iran)
- (Indonesia) Junius Bate (against Lebanon)
- (Indonesia) Agus Dwipayana (against Japan)
- (Iran) Moslem Mesigar (against Oman)
- (Japan) Takumi Uesato (against Iran)
- (Thailand) Chalermchai Saelim (against Afghanistan)
- (Thailand) Atus Thongdee (against the United Arab Emirates)

Source: AFC

== Qualified teams for FIFA Beach Soccer World Cup ==
The following teams qualified for the world cup.

Team	Qualified on	Previous appearances in FIFA Beach Soccer World Cup only FIFA era (since 2005)
United Arab Emirates	16 December 2022	7 (2007, 2008, 2009, 2013, 2017, 2019, 2021)
Iran	22 March 2023	7 (2006, 2007, 2008, 2011, 2013, 2015, 2017)
Japan	23 March 2023	11 (2005, 2006, 2007, 2008, 2009, 2011, 2013, 2015, 2017, 2019, 2021)
Oman	23 March 2023	4 (2011, 2015, 2019, 2021)

• Bold indicates champions for that year.
•• Italic indicates hosts for that year.
