= Teruki =

- Gender: Male

Origin
- Origin: Japanese
- Meaning: Different meanings depending on the kanji used

Teruki (written: 輝紀, 輝希, 輝樹 or 輝綺) is a masculine Japanese given name. Notable people with the name include:

- Teruki Hara (原 輝綺; born 1998), Japanese footballer
- Teruki Miyamoto (宮本 輝紀; 1940–2000), Japanese footballer
- Teruki Origuchi (折口 輝樹; born 2001), Japanese footballer
- Teruki Tabata (田畑 輝樹; born 1979), Japanese footballer
- Teruki Tanaka (田中 輝希; born 1992), Japanese footballer
