= Ozu Moreira =

Japanese beach soccer player

Ozu Moreira 茂怜羅 オズ
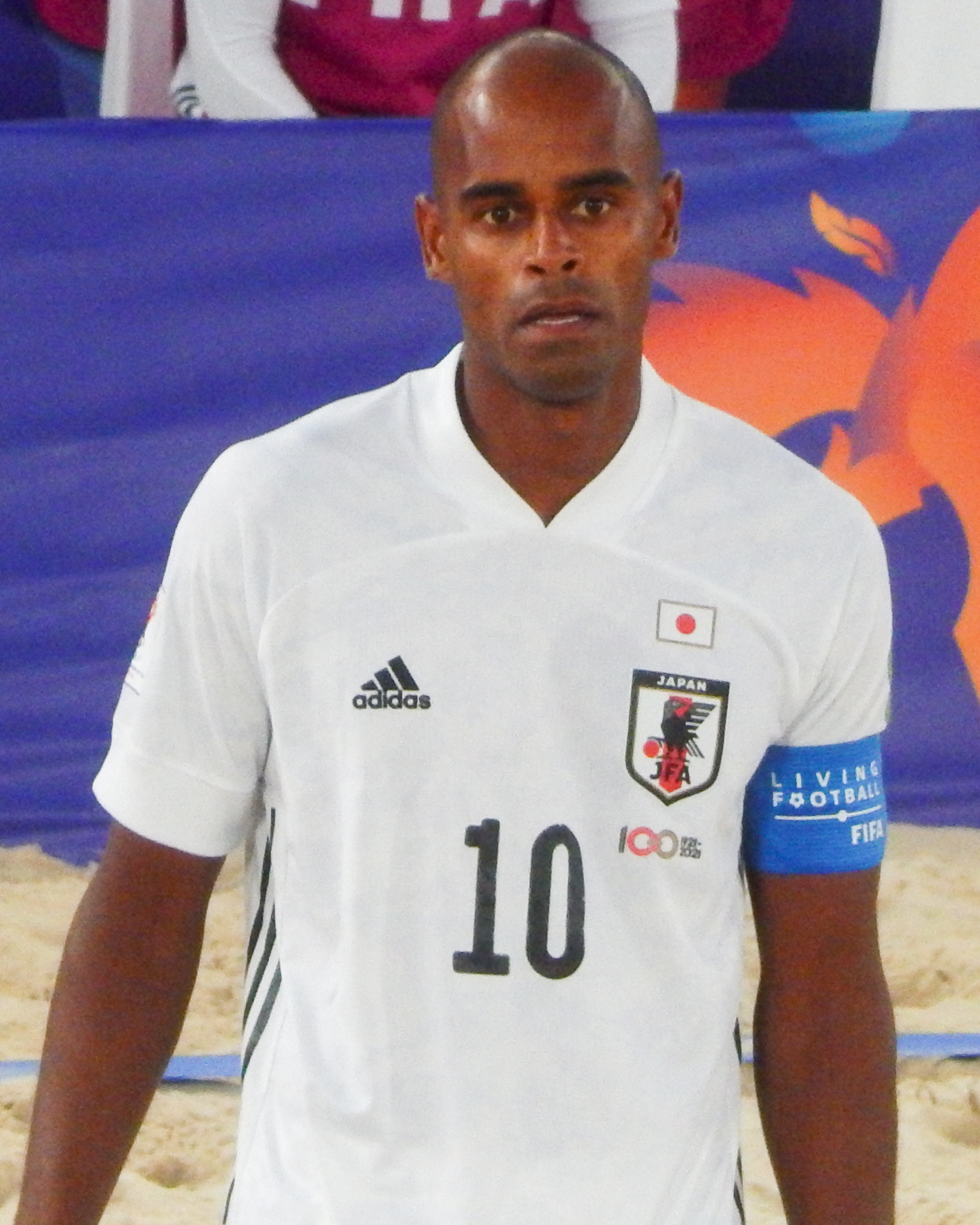
- Ozu playing at the 2021 World Cup.

Personal information
- Full name: Osmar Shigeru Moreira
- Date of birth: 21 January 1986 (age 40)
- Place of birth: Rio de Janeiro, Brazil
- Height: 1.90 m (6 ft 3 in)
- Position: Defender

International career^{‡}
Years	Team	Apps	(Gls)
2013–	Japan	160	(150)

Managerial career
- 2020–2022: Japan
Japanese name
Kanji	茂怜羅 オズ
Hiragana	もれいら おず
Katakana	モレイラ オズ
Transcriptions: Romanization: Moreira Ozu
- ‡ National team caps and goals as of 20 March 2025

Osmar Shigeru "Ozu" Moreira (Japanese: 茂怜羅 オズ, romanized: Moreira Ozu; 21 January 1986) is a Brazilian-born Japanese beach soccer player who plays as a defender. He is the captain of the Japan national team.

Moreira has won the Silver and Golden Balls at FIFA World Cups and is known as one of the best defenders in beach soccer history. He is particularly known for his towering presence and powerful long-range free kicks. In 2019, he became the first Japanese player to score over 100 international goals.

== Biography ==
=== Early life ===
Ozu was born in Rio de Janeiro, Brazil and began playing beach soccer aged six on the beaches of Copacabana, growing up playing with future members of the Brazil national team including Rafinha, Bokinha and Mauricinho. Aged 10, Ozu's beach soccer school accepted an invite to play an exhibition match before a Brazil match at Copacabana arena which was watched by 5,000 people. As a child, Ozu played association football including joining Vasco da Gama aged 14 and was scouted on numerous occasions but living minutes from the beach and watching beach soccer regularly on TV was the inspiration for Ozu to pursue becoming a beach soccer professional, aged 16. In 2004, at 18, he signed his first beach soccer contract, with São Paulo.

=== Japanese citizenship ===
Ozu has stated that he never had the ambition to play for the Brazil national team. Instead, his dream was to live abroad, learn about a new culture and compete as a beach soccer player there.

In 2006, he moved to Germany and briefly played there. In 2007, aged 21, he accepted an offer to play for Lequios in Okinawa, Japan. Despite having no experience with Japanese culture, he immediately adapted to the way of life and, thanks to his experience of the cordiality of the Japanese people, fell in love with the country. In 2009, Lequios relocated from Okinawa to Tokyo and Ozu followed suit. There, he met with fellow Brazilian and naturalised Japanese, Ruy Ramos, then coach of the Japan national team. In spite of offers to play for Brazil, Ozu expressed to Ramos his desire to also gain Japanese citizenship so that he could play for Japan, the country of his "heart". Ramos decided to help him. Ozu subsequently learnt to be fluent in the Japanese language and after five mandatory years of living in Japan, he acquired citizenship on 12 December 2012 and dropped the name of Osmar for Ozu; he was immediately called up to the Japan national team.

=== International career ===
At his first international tournament, the 2013 AFC Beach Soccer Championship, he was crowned best player and later in the year led his new country as captain to the quarter-finals of the 2013 FIFA Beach Soccer World Cup, his first World Cup, in which he won the Silver Ball (second best player) award. The inaugural Beach Soccer Stars awards in 2014 saw Ozu named as part of the best team of the year, an accomplishment he has achieved again every since bar one as of 2022, the most appearances of any player, cementing his position as one of the world's best.

In 2015, Ozu was once again named best player at the AFC Championship and was also joint top scorer. He also joined the FC Barcelona team at that year's Mundialito de Clubes which the Spanish team won and opened his own institution for children, the "Copacabana Beach Soccer School", in Okinawa. 2016 saw Ozu branch further into playing for European clubs; he became the second Japanese to play in the Italian National League, for Viareggio, winning Europe's top club prize, the Euro Winners Cup, with the Tuscan side that season. He has since had spells at FC City and Lokomotiv Moscow of Russia, Sporting CP of Portugal and Falfala Kfar Qassem of Israel. In 2017, Ozu joined the first J-League club to establish a beach soccer branch, Tokyo Verdy, who he would go on to win multiple JFA League titles with. He also became an ambassador of the JFA's 'Teacher of Dreams' project, touring schools across Japan, explaining to children how he has overcome problems in his life to achieve the successes in his field. The AFC described Ozu's performance as "outstanding" as he again won the best player and top scorer awards of the AFC Championship, this time the 2019 edition, which Japan won for the first time under his captaincy. 2019 continued to mark major international landmarks for Ozu as he reached a century of goals scored in a 7–2 win over Uruguay at the World Beach Games and also earned his 100th cap at the Intercontinental Cup a month later. Despite crucially missing his attempt in the penalty shootout against Portugal in the semi-final, Ozu ultimately inspired Japan to a positive 2019 World Cup performance of fourth place, their joint best ever finish at the World Cup at the time, and he also won the prestigious Golden Ball (best player) award at the tournament.

In July 2020, Ozu was named as the new head coach of the Japan national team, making him a player-manager; he appointed Teruki Tabata as his assistant coach. At the 2021 World Cup, he led Japan to the best ever placing for an Asian nation in the competition by finishing as runners-up, losing to hosts Russia in the final. However Ozu was critical of his personal performances having only registered a single goal during the tournament. Regardless, he was then voted by fellow players and coaches as the best player in the world for the first time at November's Beach Soccer Stars awards in Dubai. Upon returning to Japan, Ozu and some fellow teammates were found to have breached COVID-19 quarantine procedures; consequently, all accused were suspended from football activities for one month until January 2022 and Ozu apologised for his actions.

== Statistics ==
Note: Some of the sources of these statistics may have counted an appearance when the player was actually an unused substitute.

Country

Competition	Year	Apps	Goals	Ref.
FIFA Beach Soccer World Cup	(French Polynesia) 2013	4	4	
FIFA Beach Soccer World Cup	(Portugal) 2015	4	1	
FIFA Beach Soccer World Cup	(The Bahamas) 2017	3	0	
FIFA Beach Soccer World Cup	(Paraguay) 2019	6	7	
FIFA Beach Soccer World Cup	(Russia) 2021	6	1	
FIFA Beach Soccer World Cup	(United Arab Emirates) 2024	3	2	
Total		26	15	—

Competition	Year	Apps	Goals	Ref.
AFC Beach Soccer Championship	(Qatar) 2013	5	7	
AFC Beach Soccer Championship	(Qatar) 2015	6	8	
AFC Beach Soccer Championship	(Malaysia) 2017	5	7	
AFC Beach Soccer Championship	(Thailand) 2019	6	9	
AFC Beach Soccer Championship	(Thailand) 2023	6	5	
AFC Beach Soccer Championship	(Thailand) 2025	6	5	
Total		34	41	—

Club

Tournament	Year	Club	Apps	Goals	Ref.
Euro Winners Cup
Euro Winners Cup	(Italy) 2016	(Italy) Viareggio	7	2	
Euro Winners Cup	(Portugal) 2017	(Italy) Viareggio	7	8	
Euro Winners Cup	(Portugal) 2018	(Israel) Kfar Qassem	6	7	
Euro Winners Cup	(Portugal) 2019	(Russia) Lokomotiv Moscow	7	5	
Euro Winners Cup	(Portugal) 2022	(Israel) Kfar Qassem	7	2	
Euro Winners Cup	(Portugal) 2023	(Italy) Viareggio	5	5	
Euro Winners Cup	(Portugal) 2024	(Italy) Viareggio	5	2	
Total			44	31	—

== Honours ==
The following is a selection, not an exhaustive list, of the major international honours Ozu has achieved:

=== Team ===
- FIFA Beach Soccer World Cup
  - Runner-up (1): 2021
  - Fourth place (1): 2019
- AFC Beach Soccer Asian Cup
  - Winner (1): 2019
  - Runner-up (3): 2013, 2015, 2023
- Asian Beach Games
  - Gold medal (1): 2016
  - Silver medal (1): 2014
- Mundialito
  - Runner-up (1): 2014
- Euro Winners Cup
  - Winner (1): 2016
- Mundialito de Clubes
  - Winner (2): 2015, 2017

=== Individual ===
- FIFA Beach Soccer World Cup (2):
  - Golden Ball: 2019
  - Silver Ball: 2013
- Beach Soccer Stars (9):
  - World's best player: 2021
  - World dream team: 2014, 2015, 2016, 2018, 2019, 2021, 2022, 2023
- AFC Beach Soccer Asian Cup (8):
  - Best player: 2013, 2015, 2019
  - Top scorer: 2015, 2019
  - Team of the tournament: 2017, 2019, 2023
- Mundialito de Clubes (1):
  - Best player: 2015
