= Japan national under-23 futsal team =

Japanese sports team

Japan Under-23
- Association: Japan Football Association (JFA)
- Confederation: AFC (Asia)
- Head coach: Kenichiro Kogure
- FIFA code: JPN

The Japan national under-23 futsal team represents Japan in international under-23 futsal competitions. It is controlled by the Futsal Commission of the Japan Football Association.

== 2023 ==
31 January 2023 International friendly	France	3–4	Japan	Saint-Brice-sous-Forêt, France
20:00 UTC+1		Report (JFA); Report (JFA)	Harada 13'; Mori 15', 40'; Kanazawa 37'	Stadium: Centre Culturel et Sportif

1 February 2023 International friendly	France	1–6	Japan	France
		Report (JFA)

- Fixtures & Results (U-23 futsal 2023), JFA.jp

== Coaching staff ==
=== Current coaching staff ===
As of 31 December 2022

Role	Name
Head coach	(Japan) Kenichiro Kogure
Assistant coach	(Japan) Kensuke Takahashi
Assistant coach	(Japan) Takehiro Suga
Goalkeeping coach	(Japan) Keitaro Uchiyama
Goalkeeping coach	(Japan) Takashi Akutsu
Physical coach	(Japan) Toru Sato

== Players ==
=== Current squad ===
The following players were called-up for an overseas training camp, held in France from 28 January to 3 February 2023.

No.	Pos.	Player	Date of birth (age)	Club
1	GK	Kosei Ido	14 February 2003 (age 22)	(Japan) YSCC Yokohama
2	GK	Wataru Nakazawa	3 May 2001 (age 24)	(Japan) Shonan Bellmare
3	FP	Yudai Takahashi	27 January 2000 (age 25)	(Japan) Pescadola Machida
4	FP	Ryoma Kurashina	13 October 2001 (age 23)	(Japan) Pescadola Machida
5	FP	Masashi Osawa	14 June 2001 (age 24)	(Spain) Inter FS
6	FP	Taiki Miyagawa	31 August 2001 (age 23)	(Japan) Nagoya Oceans
7	FP	Kaito Yamada	1 August 2004 (age 21)	(Spain) Inter FS
8	FP	Shoto Yamanaka	30 July 2002 (age 23)	(Japan) Pescadola Machida
9	FP	Gensuke Mori	12 April 2001 (age 24)	(Spain) Real Betis Futsal
10	FP	Sora Kanazawa	26 December 2001 (age 23)	(Japan) Tachikawa-Fuchu Athletic
11	FP	Haruto Tsuruya	10 March 2001 (age 24)	(Japan) Shonan Bellmare
12	FP	Kokoro Harada	1 July 2004 (age 21)	(Spain) Barça Atlètic
13	FP	Akihiro Oshima	7 August 2000 (age 25)	(Japan) Bardral Urayasu
14	FP	Keita Nakashima	15 July 2003 (age 22)	(Spain) Parrulo Ferrol FS

== See also ==
- Sport in Japan
  - Futsal in Japan
- Japan Football Association (JFA)

National teams
Men's

- Japan national futsal team
- Japan national under-20 futsal team

Women's

- Japan women's national futsal team
