= Takuya Akaguma =

Japanese footballer and beach soccer player

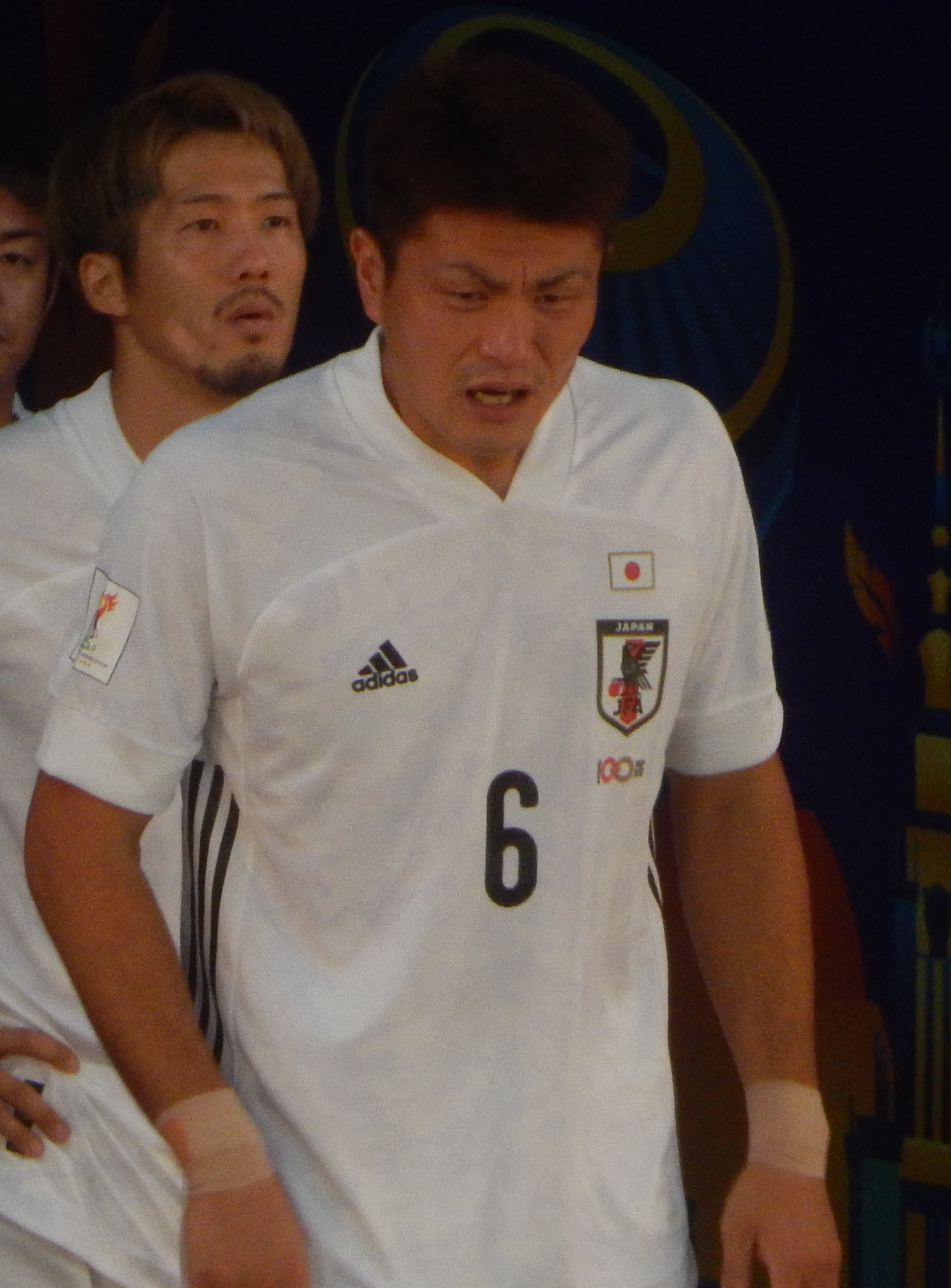
- Akaguma at the 2021 World Cup.

Personal information
- Date of birth: 21 November 1989 (age 36)
- Place of birth: Soeda, Fukuoka, Japan
- Height: 1.86 m (6 ft 1 in)
- Position: Pivot

Team information
- Current team: Lazo Apego Kitakyushu

International career^{‡}
Years	Team	Apps	(Gls)
	Japan	139	(130)
- ‡ National team caps and goals as of 20 March 2025

Takuya Akaguma (赤熊 卓弥, Akaguma Takuya; born 21 November 1989) is a Japanese beach soccer player. With the Japan national beach soccer team, he won the silver medal at the 2021 FIFA Beach Soccer World Cup held in Russia.
