= Japan national beach soccer team =

Japan
- Association: JFA
- Confederation: AFC
- Head coach: Teruki Tabata
- Captain: Ozu Moreira
- FIFA code: JPN
- BSWW ranking: 8 (2 September 2026)
First colours
Second colours

Biggest win
- Japan 16–0 Philippines (Dubai, United Arab Emirates; 22 May 2006)

Biggest defeat
- Japan 2–15 Brazil (Miura, Japan; 6 July 1996)

World Cup
- Appearances: 13 (first in 2005)
- Best result: (silver) Runners-up (2021)

AFC Beach Soccer Asian Cup
- Appearances: 10 (first in 2006)
- Best result: (gold) Champions (2009, 2011, 2019)

The Japan national beach soccer team represents Japan in international beach soccer competitions and is controlled by the JFA, the governing body for football in Japan. One of the leading Asian beach soccer teams, Japan's best performance at the FIFA Beach Soccer World Cup was in the 2021 edition, when they were runners-up to the hosts Russia, which played as the Russian Football Union (RFU).

.

== Results and fixtures ==
Legend

Win Draw Lose Fixture

== Coaching staff ==
=== Current coaching staff ===
As of 21 September 2022

Role	Name
Player/Head Coach	(Japan) Ozu Moreira (JFA National Coaching Staff/Tokyo Verdy BS)
Assistant coach	(Japan) Teruki Tabata (JFA National Coaching Staff/Veertien Mie BS)
Physical Coach	(Japan) Akihiro Tanaka (JFA Physical Fitness Project)

- Source: Coaches

=== Manager history ===
- (Japan) Ruy Ramos (20xx–2019)
- (Japan) Teruki Tabata (2020–present)
- (Japan) Ozu Moreira (2021, interim)

== Players ==
=== Current squad ===
The following players were called up for the NEOM Beach Soccer Cup and a UAE Tour, held from October to November 2023. Takuya Akaguma was eventually forced to leave the squad due to an injury, announced on 31 October.

No.	Pos.	Player	Date of birth (age)	Club
12	GK	Shinya Shibamoto	6 May 1988 (age 38)	(Japan Football Association) Tokyo Verdy
16	GK	Takeru Furusato		(Japan Football Association) Loewe Yokohama
1	GK	Yusuke Kawai	2 August 2000 (age 26)	(Japan Football Association) Tokyo Verdy
2	FP	Ryunosuke Miyama	6 September 1994 (age 32)	(Japan Football Association) Tokyo Verdy
3	FP	Yuki Kibune	27 October 1993 (age 33)	(Japan Football Association) Averdade Kumamoto
4	FP	Kosuke Matsuda	26 September 1986 (age 40)	(Japan Football Association) Loewe Yokohama
5	FP	Takumi Uesato	29 April 1990 (age 36)	(Japan Football Association) Tokyo Verdy
6	FP	Takuya Akaguma	21 November 1989 (age 37)	(Japan Football Association) Lazo Apego Kitakyushu
7	FP	Takaaki Oba	24 December 1992 (age 33)	(Japan Football Association) Loewe Yokohama
8	FP	Naoya Matsuo	18 August 1988 (age 38)	(Japan Football Association) Averdade Kumamoto
9	FP	Shusei Yamauchi	9 September 1985 (age 41)	(Japan Football Association) Tokyo Verdy
10	FP	Ozu Moreira	21 January 1986 (age 40)	(Japan Football Association) Tokyo Verdy
18	FP	Rikuto Otani		(Japan Football Association) Loewe Yokohama
19	FP	Takahito Yamada	4 January 1996 (age 30)	(Japan Football Association) Tokyo Verdy

=== Previous squads ===
- 2021 FIFA Beach Soccer World Cup squad

== Competitive record ==
=== Beach Soccer World Championships ===
Beach Soccer World Championships
Year	Round	Pos	Pld	W	W+	L	GF	GA	GD
(Brazil) 1995	did not enter								
(Brazil) 1996	did not enter								
(Brazil) 1997	Group stage	8th	3	0	0	3	5	21	−16
(Brazil) 1998	did not enter								
(Brazil) 1999	Quarterfinals	8th	3	1	0	2	15	21	−6
(Brazil) 2000	Fourth place	4th	5	2	1	2	16	22	–6
(Brazil) 2001	did not enter								
(Brazil) 2002	did not enter								
(Brazil) 2003	Group stage	7th	3	0	0	3	4	14	−10
(Brazil) 2004	did not enter								
Total	0 titles	4/10	14	3	1	10	40	78	–38

=== FIFA Beach Soccer World Cup ===
FIFA Beach Soccer World Cup										Qualification (AFC)								
Year	Round	Pos	Pld	W	W+	L	GF	GA	GD	Round	Pos	Pld	W	W+	L	GF	GA	GD
(Brazil) 2005	Fourth place	4th	5	2	0	3	10	24	–14	No qualification matches								
(Brazil) 2006	Quarterfinals	8th	4	1	0	3	17	25	−8	Runners-up	2nd	4	3	0	1	29	10	+19
(Brazil) 2007	Group stage	15th	3	0	0	3	6	13	−7	Runners-up	2nd	4	2	0	2	18	19	–1
(France) 2008	Group stage	15th	3	0	0	3	5	18	−13	Runners-up	2nd	4	2	1	1	19	8	+11
(United Arab Emirates) 2009	Quarterfinals	5th	4	2	1	1	16	11	+5	Champions	1st	4	3	0	1	16	10	+6
(Italy) 2011	Group stage	14th	3	0	0	3	6	10	−4	Champions	1st	5	4	0	1	23	13	+10
(French Polynesia) 2013	Quarterfinals	7th	4	1	1	2	11	12	−1	Runners-up	2nd	5	4	0	1	23	15	+8
(Portugal) 2015	Quarterfinals	7th	4	2	0	2	12	13	−1	Runners-up	2nd	6	5	0	1	24	12	+12
(The Bahamas) 2017	Group stage	10th	3	1	0	2	15	17	−2	Third place	3rd	5	3	0	2	41	18	+23
(Paraguay) 2019	Fourth place	4th	6	4	0	2	24	20	+4	Champions	1st	6	4	2	0	32	8	+25
(Russia) 2021	Runners-up	2nd	6	4	0	2	24	25	–1	Cancelled (Note: The Asian qualifiers were originally due to take place in Thailand from 18–28 March 2021. Due to the COVID-19 pandemic, they were initially postponed to between 28 April and 8 May, and were subsequently cancelled entirely in January 2021. In place of the qualifiers, the AFC handpicked their three representatives to go to the World Cup on 21 April, choosing the best-performing nations over the course of the previous three editions of the AFC Beach Soccer Championship.)								
(United Arab Emirates) 2024	Quarterfinals	8th	4	2	0	2	14	17	–3	Runners-up	2nd	6	5	0	1	35	11	+24
(Seychelles) 2025	Quarterfinals	5th	4	2	0	2	25	17	+8	Third place								
Total	0 titles	13/13	53	21	2	30	185	222	–37	3 titles	10/10	49	30	3	11	260	123	+137

=== AFC Beach Soccer Asian Cup ===
AFC Beach Soccer Asian Cup
Year	Round	Pos	Pld	W	W+	L	GF	GA	GD
(United Arab Emirates) 2006	Runners-up	2nd	4	3	0	1	29	10	+19
(United Arab Emirates) 2007	Runners-up	2nd	4	2	0	2	18	19	−1
(United Arab Emirates) 2008	Runners-up	2nd	4	2	1	1	19	8	+11
(United Arab Emirates) 2009	Champions	1st	4	3	0	1	16	10	+6
(Oman) 2011	Champions	1st	5	4	0	1	23	13	+10
(Qatar) 2013	Runners-up	2nd	5	4	0	1	23	15	+8
(Qatar) 2015	Runners-up	2nd	6	5	0	1	24	12	+12
(Malaysia) 2017	Third place	3rd	5	3	0	2	41	18	+23
(Thailand) 2019	Champions	1st	6	4	2	0	32	8	+24
(Thailand) 2021	Canceled due to COVID-19 pandemic.								
(Thailand) 2023	Runners-up	2nd	6	5	0	1	35	11	+24
(Thailand) 2025	Third place	3rd	6	5	0	1	28	13	+15
Total	3 titles	11/11	55	40	3	12	288	137	+151

=== Asian Beach Games ===
Asian Beach Games
Year	Round	Pos	Pld	W	W+	L	GF	GA	GD
(Indonesia) 2008	did not enter								
(Oman) 2010	Quarterfinal	–	4	2	0	2	14	7	+7
(China) 2012	Quarterfinal	–	4	2	0	2	11	9	+2
(Thailand) 2014	Runners-up	2nd	5	3	0	2	22	11	+11
(Vietnam) 2016	Champions	1st	5	4	1	0	34	12	+22
Total	1 title	4/5	18	11	1	6	81	39	+42

=== Beach Soccer Intercontinental Cup ===
Beach Soccer Intercontinental Cup
Year	Round	Pos	Pld	W	W+	L	GF	GA	GD
(United Arab Emirates) 2011	Did Not Enter								
(United Arab Emirates) 2012	7th place	7th	3	0	0	3	14	19	−5
(United Arab Emirates) 2013	Did Not Enter								
(United Arab Emirates) 2014	7th place	7th	5	2	0	3	19	22	−3
(United Arab Emirates) 2015	Did Not Enter								
(United Arab Emirates) 2016	Did Not Enter								
(United Arab Emirates) 2017	Did Not Enter								
(United Arab Emirates) 2018	Did Not Enter								
(United Arab Emirates) 2019	5th place	5th	5	3	0	2	21	14	+7
(United Arab Emirates) 2021	5th place	5th	5	2	0	3	22	27	–5
(United Arab Emirates) 2022	5th place	5th	5	2	0	3	25	16	+9
Total	5th place	5/11	23	9	0	14	101	98	+3

=== Continental Beach Soccer Tournament ===
Continental Beach Soccer Tournament
Year	Round	Pos	Pld	W	W+	L	GF	GA	GD
(China) 2016	Third place	3	3	2	0	1	21	13	+8
Total	0 titles	1/1	3	2	0	1	21	13	+8

== World ranking ==
- Source: Beach Soccer Worldwide

== See also ==
Japan
Men's

- International footballers
- National football team (Results (2020–present))
- National under-23 football team
- National under-20 football team
- National under-17 football team
- National futsal team
- National under-20 futsal team
- National beach soccer team

Women's

- International footballers
- National football team (Results)
- National under-20 football team
- National under-17 football team
- National futsal team
