= Takaaki Oba =

Japanese footballer and beach soccer player

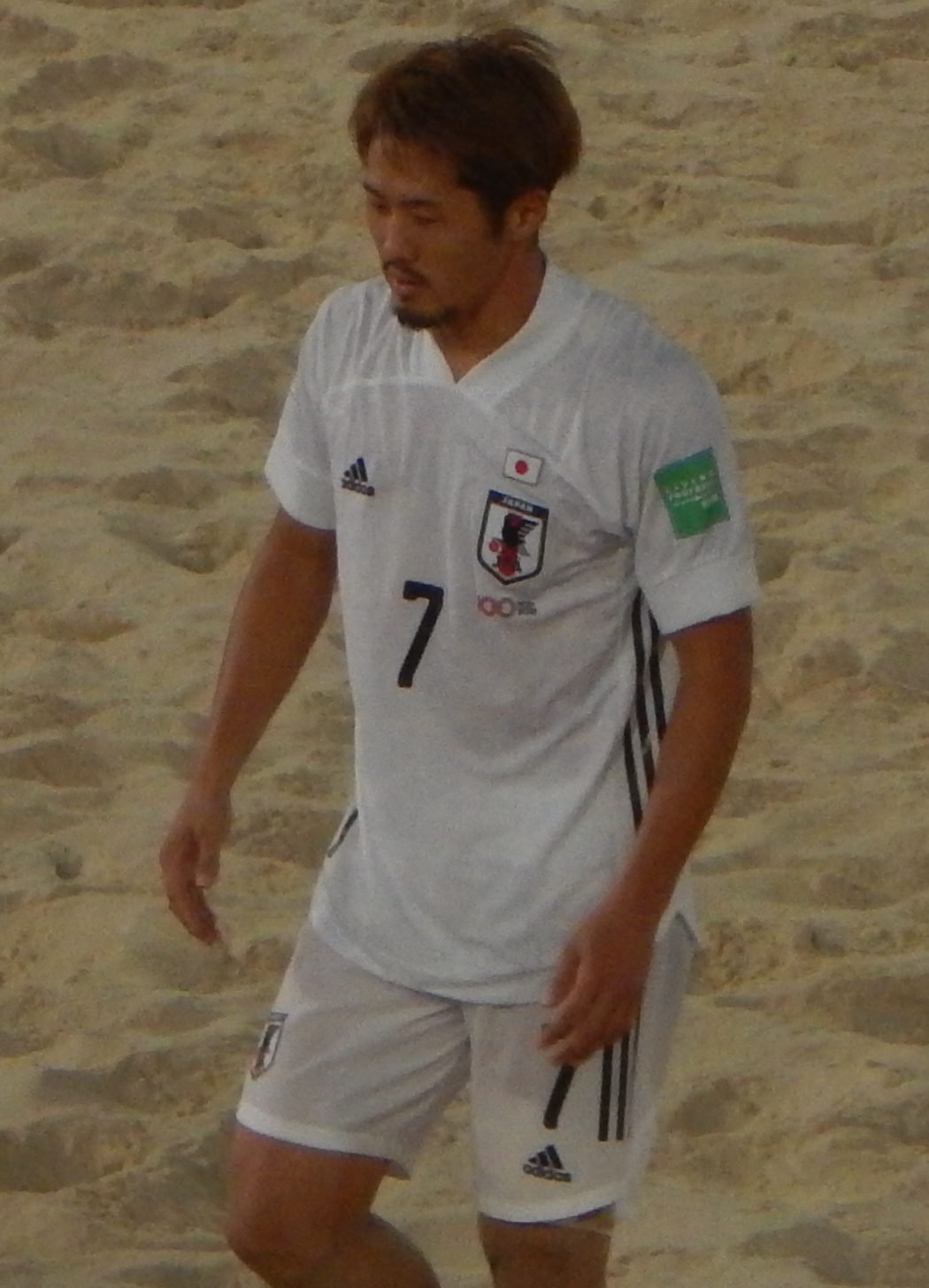
- Oba at the 2021 World Cup.

Personal information
- Date of birth: 24 December 1992 (age 33)
- Place of birth: Fukuoka, Japan
- Height: 1.75 m (5 ft 9 in)

Team information
- Current team: Loewe Yokohama

International career^{‡}
Years	Team	Apps	(Gls)
	Japan	143	(107)
- ‡ National team caps and goals as of 20 March 2025

Takaaki Oba (大場 崇晃, Ōba Takaaki; born 24 December 1992) is a Japanese beach soccer player. With the Japan national beach soccer team, he won the silver medal at the 2021 FIFA Beach Soccer World Cup held in Russia.
