= Teruki Tabata =

Japanese footballer

Teruki Tabata 田畑 輝樹
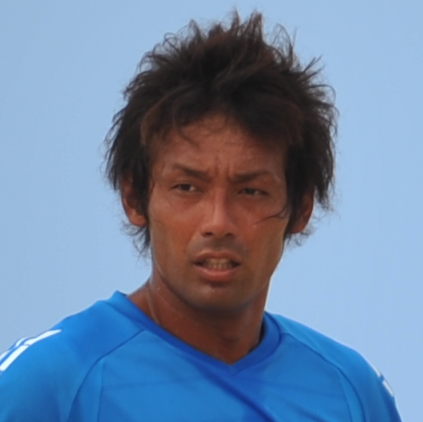

Personal information
- Full name: Teruki Tabata
- Date of birth: April 16, 1979 (age 47)
- Place of birth: Kagoshima, Japan
- Height: 1.78 m (5 ft 10 in)
- Position: Defender

Youth career
- 1995–1997: Kagoshima Jitsugyo High School

Senior career*
Years	Team	Apps	(Gls)
1998–1999	Albirex Niigata		

International career^{‡}
2007–2017	Japan Beach Soccer		

Managerial career
- 2020–2021: Japan Beach Soccer
- * Club domestic league appearances and goals ‡ National team caps and goals as of 2 December 2019

Teruki Tabata (田畑 輝樹, Tabata Teruki; born April 16, 1979) is a former Japanese football player.

== Playing career ==
Tabata was born in Kagoshima Prefecture on April 16, 1979. After graduating from high school, he joined Japan Football League club Albirex Niigata in 1998. The club was promoted to new league J2 League from 1999. However he could hardly play in the match and retired at the end of the 1999 season.

== Beach Soccer career ==
In 2007, Tabata was selected Japan national beach soccer team. He played at Beach Soccer World Cup 7 times (2007, 2008, 2009, 2011, 2013, 2015 and 2017).

== Career statistics ==
Appearances and goals by club, season and competition
Club	Season	League			Emperor's Cup		J.League Cup		Total	
Club	Season	Division	Apps	Goals	Apps	Goals	Apps	Goals	Apps	Goals
Albirex Niigata	1998	Football League								
Albirex Niigata	1999	J2 League	2	0			1	0	3	0
Career total			2	0	0	0	1	0	3	0
