= Takumi Uesato =

Japanese footballer and beach soccer player

Personal information
- Full name: Takumi Uesato
- Date of birth: 29 April 1990 (age 36)
- Place of birth: Okinawa, Japan
- Height: 1.75 m (5 ft 9 in)
- Position: Forward

Team information
- Current team: Tokyo Verdy (beach soccer)
- Number: 58

Youth career
- 1997–2002: Miyako Minami FC
- 2003–2005: Miyakojima Kita Junior High School
- 2006–2008: Miyako High School

Senior career*
| Years | Team | Apps | (Gls) |
| 2009–2011 | Kyoto Sanga FC | 2 | (0) |
| 2011–2013 | FC Ryukyu | 33 | (4) |
| 2014–2016 | Allerheiligen | 9 | (3) |
| 2016–2017 | JPV Marikina | 14 | (15) |
| 2018 | Ceres–Negros | 0 | (2) |
| 2018 | JPV Marikina | | |
| 2020 | Kaya–Iloilo | 0 | (0) |
| Total | | 58 | (22) |
Medal record
Kyoto Sanga FC
| Runner-up | Emperor's Cup | 2011 |
- * Club domestic league appearances and goals as of 07 April 2020

Takumi Uesato (上里 琢文, Uesato Takumi; born 29 April 1990 in Okinawa Prefecture, Japan) is a Japanese football player who currently plays beach soccer for Tokyo Verdy.

== Career ==
In his youth, Uesato played for Miyako Minami FC. He was also part of his schools' football team playing for Miyakojima Kita Junior School and Miyako High School before playing professionally for Kyoto Sanga FC. He made his debut in J. League Division 1 with Kyoto Sanga in 2009.

After his Kyoto Sanga stint, he played for FC Ryukyu and later for Austrian club USV Allerheiligen. He then move to the Philippines to play for JPV Marikina at the United Football League and later, the Philippines Football League (PFL). In January 2018, he moved to Ceres–Negros and left the club in July 2018.

He had a brief stint with Kaya–Iloilo, joining the club in early 2020. He returned to Japan within the year to join Tokyo Verdy's beach soccer team in September.

== Club statistics ==
| Club | Season | League | | Emperor's Cup | | J. League Cup | | Total | |
| Club | Season | Apps | Goals | Apps | Goals | Apps | Goals | Apps | Goals |
|---|---|---|---|---|---|---|---|---|---|
| Kyoto Sanga FC | 2009 | 2 | 0 | 0 | 0 | 0 | 0 | 2 | 0 |
| Kyoto Sanga FC | 2010 | 0 | 0 | 0 | 0 | 0 | 0 | 0 | 0 |
| Kyoto Sanga FC | 2011 | 0 | 0 | | | - | | 0 | 0 |
| Career total | | 2 | 0 | 0 | 0 | 0 | 0 | 2 | 0 |
