= Kosuke Matsuda =

Japanese footballer

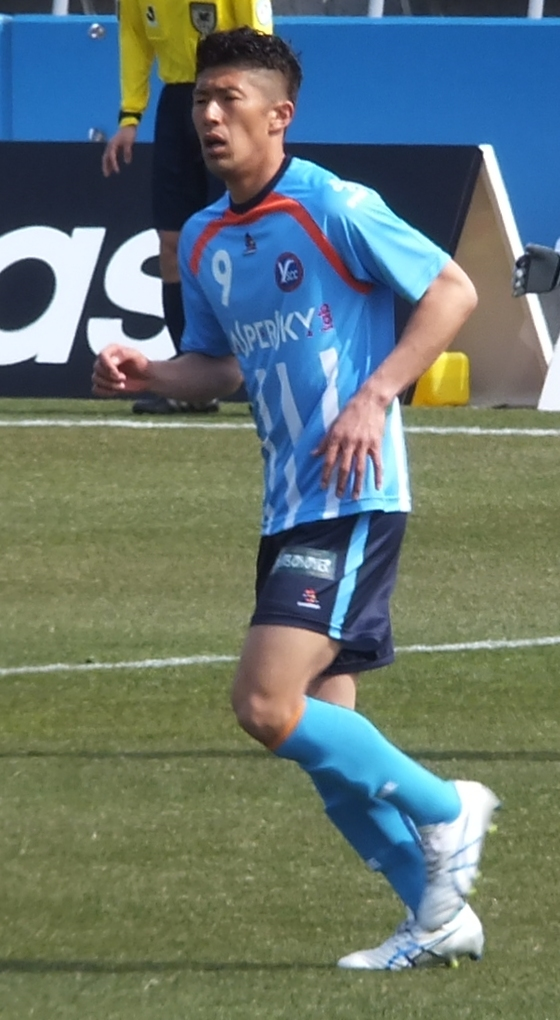

Personal information
- Full name: Kosuke Matsuda
- Date of birth: September 26, 1986 (age 40)
- Place of birth: Tokyo, Japan
- Height: 1.76 m (5 ft 9 1/2 in)
- Position: Defender

Youth career
- 2005–2008: Toin University of Yokohama

Senior career*
Years	Team	Apps	(Gls)
2009–2017	YSCC Yokohama	194	(35)
- * Club domestic league appearances and goals as of 2 February 2018

Kosuke Matsuda (松田 康佑, Matsuda Kosuke; born September 26, 1986 in Tokyo) is a former Japanese football player. He last played for YSCC Yokohama.

== Club statistics ==
Updated to 2 February 2018.

Club performance			League		Cup		Total	
Season	Club	League	Apps	Goals	Apps	Goals	Apps	Goals
Japan			League		Emperor's Cup		Total	
2010	YSCC Yokohama	JRL (Kantō, Div. 1)	13	13	0	0	13	13
2011	YSCC Yokohama	JRL (Kantō, Div. 1)	9	6	1	0	10	6
2012	YSCC Yokohama	JFL	29	1	2	0	31	1
2013	YSCC Yokohama	JFL	29	11	–		29	11
2014	YSCC Yokohama	J3 League	25	2	2	1	27	3
2015	YSCC Yokohama	J3 League	33	1	–		33	1
2016	YSCC Yokohama	J3 League	28	1	–		28	1
2017	YSCC Yokohama	J3 League	28	0	1	0	29	0
Total			194	35	5	1	200	36
