= Commonwealth Youth Games =

Multi-sport event

Games
- 2000; 2004; 2008; 2011; 2015; 2017; 2023

Sports
- Archery; Athletics; Badminton; Boxing; Cycling; Diving; Gymnastics; Hockey; Judo; Lawn bowls; Netball; Rugby sevens; Shooting; Squash; Swimming; Table tennis; Tennis; Weightlifting; Wrestling

The Commonwealth Youth Games (CYG) is an international multi-sport event organized by the Commonwealth Games Federation. The games were held in the years, mid-way between when the Commonwealth Games are held, until 2008. They continued to be held every four years, but in the year after the Commonwealth Games are held, from 2011 to 2015. Since 2017, they've been held in the year before the Commonwealth Games are held. The first edition was held in Edinburgh, Scotland from 10 to 14 August 2000. The age limitation of the athletes is from 14 to 18.

== History ==
The Commonwealth Games Federation discussed the idea of a Commonwealth Youth Games in 1997. In 1998 the concept was agreed on for the purpose of providing a Commonwealth multi-sport event for young people born in 1986 or later.

== Editions of the games ==
The first edition of the Commonwealth Youth Games were held in Edinburgh, Scotland from 10 to 14 August 2000. Fifteen countries contested 483 medals over three days of competition in eight sports. A total of 773 athletes, 280 Technical Officials and around 500 volunteers participated in the event. Eight sports were contested. These included: Athletics, Fencing, Gymnastics, Hockey, Lawn Tennis, Squash, Swimming and Weightlifting.

The second edition of the Commonwealth Youth Games was held in Bendigo, Australia from 30 November to 4 December 2004, 22 countries participated and contested in 10 sports events spread over a period of 3 days, which included Athletics, Badminton, Boxing, Lawn Bowls, Rugby 7's, Tenpin Bowling, Swimming, Cycling, Gymnastics and Weightlifting.980 athletes and team officials were involved in the Games in Bendigo.

The third edition of the Commonwealth Youth Games was held in Pune, India from 12 to 18 October 2008. Over 1,220 athletes and 350 officials from 71 countries participated in these games, in 9 disciplines – Athletics, Badminton, Boxing, Shooting, Swimming, Table Tennis, Tennis, Weightlifting and Wrestling.

The fourth edition of the Commonwealth Youth Games was held in Isle of Man from 7 to 13 September 2011. 811 athletes from 64 commonwealth nations competed at the 2011 Commonwealth Youth Games.

The fifth edition of the Commonwealth Youth Games was held in Apia from 5 to 11 September 2015, the capital of Samoa. Samoa were the only bidders for the Games. Around 807 athletes from 65 nations and territories participated in the nine sports: aquatics, archery, athletics, boxing, lawn bowls, rugby sevens, squash, tennis and weightlifting.

The sixth edition of the Commonwealth Youth Games was held in Nassau, Bahamas. The games were held from 18 to 23 July 2017. The sports contested at the Bahamas 2017 were Athletics, Swimming, Beach Soccer, Boxing, Cycling (Road), Judo, Rugby Sevens, Tennis and Beach Volleyball. It was the first time Judo, Beach Soccer and Beach Volleyball have been presented at a Commonwealth Youth Games.

The seventh edition of the Commonwealth Youth Games was scheduled to be held in Trinidad and Tobago between 1 and 7 August 2021. However, it was postponed due to the COVID-19 pandemic. It was further postponed due to scheduling conflicts with the 2022 Commonwealth Games. It was then held from 4 to 11 August 2023.

The eighth edition of the Commonwealth Youth Games is scheduled to take place in 2027 in Malta.

== List of Commonwealth Youth Games ==
Host cities of the Commonwealth Youth Games

Edition	Year	Location	Dates	Nations	Opened by	Competitors	Sports	Events	Top Nation
I	2000	Edinburgh, Scotland	10–14 August	15	Prince Edward, Earl of Wessex	773	8	112	England
II	2004	Bendigo, Australia	30 November–4 December	22	John Landy	980	10	146	Australia
III	2008	Pune, India	12–18 October	71	Pratibha Patil	1220	9	117	India
IV	2011	Douglas, Isle of Man	7–13 September	63	Prince Edward, Earl of Wessex	804	7	112	England
V	2015	Apia, Samoa	5–11 September	63	Tufuga Efi	926	9	107	Australia
VI	2017	Nassau, The Bahamas	18–23 July	65	Hubert Minnis	1034	8	96	England
VII	2023	Trinidad and Tobago	4–11 August	68	Christine Kangaloo	1000	7	93	Australia
VIII	2027	Malta	29 October – 4 November	74	Myriam Spiteri Debono	1200	8	116	

== Sports ==
- Athletics (2000–present)
- Archery (2015)
- Badminton (2004–2011)
- Beach soccer (2017)
- Beach volleyball (2017)
- Bowling (2004)
- Bowls (2004)
- Boxing (2004–2023)
- Cycling (2004, 2011, 2017)
- Fencing (2000)
- Field hockey (2000)
- Gymnastics (2004, 2011)
- Judo (2017)
- Netball (2027)
- Rugby sevens (2004, 2011, 2017)
- Sailing (2027)
- Shooting (2008)
- Squash (2000, 2027)
- Swimming (2000–present)
- Table tennis (2008)
- Tennis (2000, 2008, 2017)
- Triathlon (2023, 2027)
- Water polo (2027)
- Weightlifting (2000–2008, 2027)
- Wrestling (2008)

== Medal table ==
An all-time Commonwealth Youth Games from 2000 Commonwealth Youth Games to 2023 Commonwealth Youth Games, is tabulated below. The table is simply the consequence of the sum of the medal tables of the various editions of the Commonwealth Youth Games.

Rank	Nation	Gold	Silver	Bronze	Total
1	Australia	198	150	133	481
2	England	173	157	112	442
3	South Africa	60	76	87	223
4	India	51	40	39	130
5	Scotland	46	53	80	179
6	New Zealand	40	51	50	141
7	Malaysia	26	23	20	69
8	Nauru	19	2	1	22
9	Wales	16	40	36	92
10	Kenya	16	12	2	30
11	Northern Ireland	13	19	22	54
12	Singapore	12	11	16	39
13	Nigeria	12	4	3	19
14	Canada	11	28	29	68
15	Jamaica	8	4	9	21
16	Trinidad and Tobago	6	7	8	21
17	Sri Lanka	4	8	4	16
18	Samoa	4	6	11	21
19	Uganda	3	9	6	18
20	Cyprus	3	5	7	15
21	Fiji	3	4	5	12
22	Guernsey	3	0	0	3
23	Jersey	2	4	4	10
24	Guyana	2	2	1	5
25	Botswana	2	1	7	10
26	Cayman Islands	2	1	3	6
27	Barbados	2	0	2	4
27	Zambia	2	0	2	4
29	Rwanda	2	0	1	3
30	Bahamas	1	4	12	17
31	Namibia	1	1	2	4
32	Bangladesh	1	0	2	3
32	Papua New Guinea	1	0	2	3
34	Antigua and Barbuda	1	0	1	2
34	Bermuda	1	0	1	2
34	Ghana	1	0	1	2
37	Isle of Man	0	4	3	7
38	Dominica	0	2	1	3
39	Saint Lucia	0	1	3	4
40	Cook Islands	0	1	2	3
40	Solomon Islands	0	1	2	3
42	British Virgin Islands	0	1	1	2
42	Tonga	0	1	1	2
44	Anguilla	0	1	0	1
44	Mozambique	0	1	0	1
44	The Gambia	0	1	0	1
47	Mauritius	0	0	3	3
48	Grenada	0	0	2	2
48	Norfolk Island	0	0	2	2
48	Turks and Caicos Islands	0	0	2	2
51	Saint Kitts and Nevis	0	0	1	1
51	Seychelles	0	0	1	1
Totals (52 entries)		748	736	745	2,229

=== Medal leaders by year ===
Commonwealth Youth Games medal table by year
- 2000: England
- 2004: Australia
- 2008: India
- 2011: England
- 2015: Australia
- 2017: England
- 2023: Australia
- 2027: TBA

== See also ==
- Youth Olympic Games
