= Commonwealth Sport =

International organization

Commonwealth Games Federation
- Predecessor: British Commonwealth Games Federation
- Formation: 1932; 94 years ago as British Empire Games Federation
- Type: Sports federation
- Headquarters: London, England
- Members: 74 member associations
- Official language: English
- President: Donald Rukare
- Vice Presidents: Sandra Osborne (Cook Islands) Hugh Graham
- Patron: King Charles III
- Vice-Patron: The Duke of Edinburgh
- Website: www.commonwealthsport.com
- Values: Humanity • Equality • Destiny

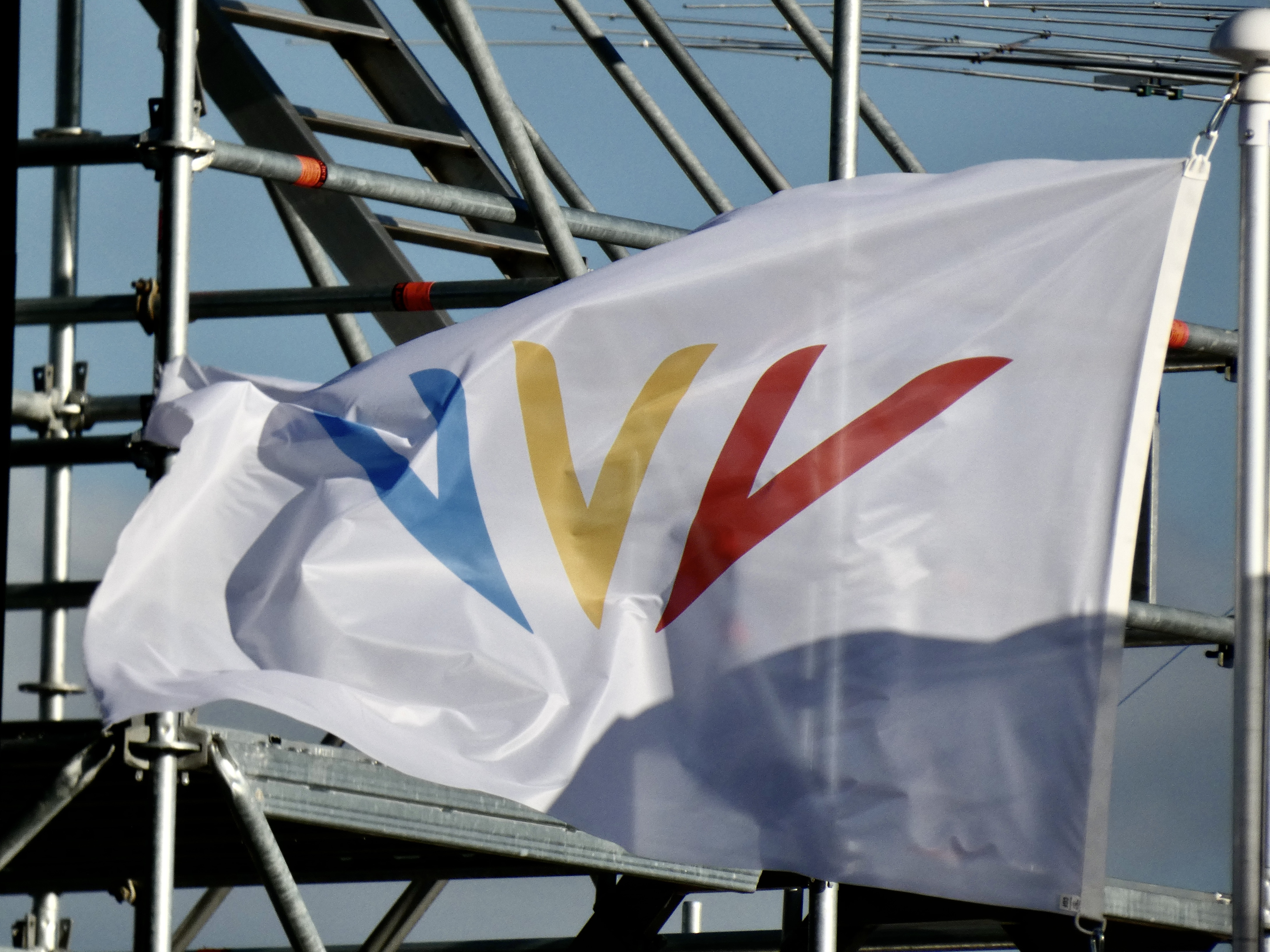
Flag of Commonwealth Sport, 2022 Commonwealth Games, Birmingham

Commonwealth Sport, formerly known as the Commonwealth Games Federation, is the international organisation responsible for the direction and control of the Commonwealth Games and Commonwealth Youth Games, and is the governing body of the Commonwealth Games Associations (CGA). It is headquartered in London, England.

== History ==
Due to the success of the first 1930 British Empire Games in Hamilton, Ontario, Canada, a meeting of representatives from Great Britain, its dominions, colonies and territories decided that the games, similar to the Olympic Games should be held every four years, and that an authoritative organisation should be formed. Following the 1932 Summer Olympics, it was decided to form the "British Empire Games Federation" who would be responsible for the organising of the games. The name of the federation was changed in 1952 to the "British Empire and Commonwealth Games Federation", and again in Jamaica in 1966 to the "British Commonwealth Games Federation", until eventually being changed again in Christchurch, New Zealand, in 1974 to the "Commonwealth Games Federation". It would again be changed to simply "Commonwealth Sport" in 2025.

The youth version of the Commonwealth Games was launched in August 2000, which is known as the Commonwealth Youth Games. The inaugural edition of the Commonwealth Youth Games was first held in Edinburgh, Scotland.

== Executive board ==
The following people are in the executive board:

Designation		Name	Country
Vice-Patron		Prince Edward	England
President		Donald Rukare	Uganda
Vice-Presidents		Sandra Osborne	Barbados
Vice-Presidents		Hugh Graham	Cook Islands
Regional Vice-Presidents	Africa	Botsang Tshenyego	Botswana
Regional Vice-Presidents	Americas	Claire Carver-Dias	Canada
Regional Vice-Presidents	Asia	Chris Chan	Singapore
Regional Vice-Presidents	Caribbean	Ephraim Penn	British Virgin Islands
Regional Vice-Presidents	Europe	Helen Phillips	Wales
Regional Vice-Presidents	Oceania	Craig Phillips	Australia
Athlete Representative		Brendan Williams	Dominica
Audit & Risk Committee Chair		Mary Hardy	England
Medical Advisor		Peter Harcourt	Australia
CEO		Katie Sadleir	New Zealand

The following people are the Honorary members of the CGF executive board:

Designation	Name	Country
Honorary Life Presidents	Hon. Michael Fennell, OJ, CD	Jamaica
Honorary Life Presidents	HRH Tunku Imran	Malaysia
Honorary Life Presidents	Dame Louise Martin, DBE	Scotland
Honorary Life Vice-Presidents	Alexander B. Chapman, HBM	Trinidad and Tobago
Honorary Life Vice-Presidents	Sharad Rao	Kenya
Honorary Life Vice-Presidents	Sir Austin Sealy, SCM	Barbados
Honorary Life Vice-Presidents	Dr. Manikavasagam Jegathesan	Malaysia
Honorary Life Vice-Presidents	Gideon Sam	South Africa
Honorary Life Vice-Presidents	Bruce Robertson	Canada

== Organisation ==
=== General Assembly ===
The General Assembly is the ultimate governance and authority in Commonwealth Sport, with powers to vote on decisions, including on which cities and Commonwealth Games Association's will host the Commonwealth Games. It consists of 3 or more representatives of a Commonwealth Games Association of each member countries and territories, the Vice-Patron, Life Vice-Presidents and the members of the Executive Board.

Sessions of the General Assembly are chaired by the Commonwealth Sport President, with each CGA and the President having one vote. However the Vice-Patron, Life Vice-Presidents, the Executive Board, representatives of an Organising Committee (OC) of a Commonwealth Games and observers invited by the President may deliberate but do not have voting powers at the General Assembly.

== Honours ==
As well as awarding medals to athletes, Commonwealth Sport may award membership of the Order of Merit (Commonwealth Sport) for distinguished services rendered to the Commonwealth Games movement, including the games themselves, to the federation and to a Commonwealth Games Association. The honour is awarded on the recommendation of the Executive Board at the General Assembly.

On recommendation of the Executive Board, at General Assembly the federation may also elect Life Vice-Presidents, providing there are no more than six Life Vice-Presidents at a time as an award for services to Commonwealth Sport. Former Chairmen and presidents automatically become a Life Vice-President.

== Leadership ==
The President of Commonwealth Sport is responsible for chairing the Executive Board and the General Assembly. A candidate is elected to the position by the General Assembly the year following the Commonwealth Games. Other duties include inviting the Head of the Commonwealth for the opening and closing declaration of the games and overseeing the preparations for upcoming events.

Previously before the XVI Commonwealth Games in 1998, the President was a ceremonial role, taking on the duties of the Vice-Patron. The late Prince Philip, Duke of Edinburgh served as the president between 1955 and 1990. The chairman was elected by the General Assembly as head of Commonwealth Sport.

No.	Name	Origin	Took office	Left office	Games
1	Sir James Leigh-Wood, KBE, CB, CMG	England	1930	1938	1930: I British Empire Games; 1934: II British Empire Games; 1938: III British Empire Games
2	Arthur Porritt, Baron Porritt, Bt., KCMG CBE	New Zealand	1950	1966	1950: IV British Empire Games; 1954: V British Empire and Commonwealth Games; 1958: VI British Empire and Commonwealth Games; 1962: VII British Empire and Commonwealth Games; 1966: VIII British Empire and Commonwealth Games
3	Sir Alexander Ross	New Zealand	1968	1982	1970: IX British Commonwealth Games; 1974: X British Commonwealth Games; 1978: XI Commonwealth Games; 1982: XII Commonwealth Games
4	Peter Heatly, CBE, DL	Scotland	1982	1990	1986: XIII Commonwealth Games; 1990: XIV Commonwealth Games
5	Arnaldo de Oliveira Sales GBM, OBE, JP	Hong Kong	1994	1997	1994: XV Commonwealth Games
6	Michael Fennell, OJ, CD	Jamaica	1997	2010	1998: XVI Commonwealth Games; 2000: I Commonwealth Youth Games; 2002: XVII Commonwealth Games; 2004: II Commonwealth Youth Games; 2006: XVIII Commonwealth Games; 2008: III Commonwealth Youth Games; 2010: XIX Commonwealth Games
7	Prince Tunku Imran of Negeri Sembilan	Malaysia	2010	2014	2011: IV Commonwealth Youth Games; 2014: XX Commonwealth Games
8	Dame Louise Martin, DBE	Scotland	2014	2023	2015: V Commonwealth Youth Games; 2017: VI Commonwealth Youth Games; 2018: XXI Commonwealth Games; 2022: XXII Commonwealth Games; 2023: VII Commonwealth Youth Games
9	Christopher Jenkins	Wales	2023	2025	None
10	Donald Rukare	Uganda	2025	present	2026: XXIII Commonwealth Games; 2027: VIII Commonwealth Youth Games; 2030: XXIV Commonwealth Games

== See also ==
- Global Association of International Sports Federations
- International Olympic Committee
