= Sachin Siwach (born 1999) =

Indian boxer (born 1999)

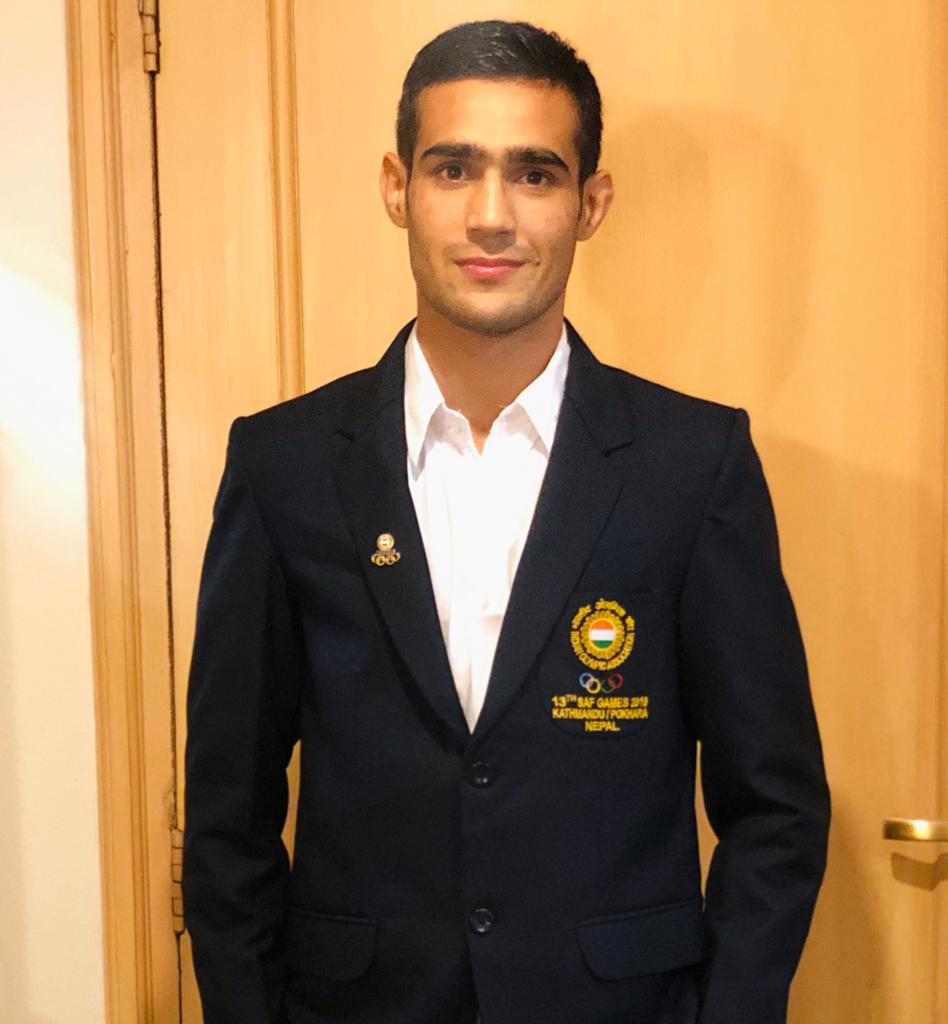
- Siwach at the 2019 South Asian Games

Personal information
- Born: 6 December 1999 (age 26) Bhiwani, Haryana, India
- Height: 1.77 m (5 ft 10 in)

Sport
- Sport: Boxing
- Weight class: 56 kg (123 lb)
Medal record
Men's amateur boxing
Representing India
South Asian Games
Gold medal – first place	2019 Kathmandu	56kg
Youth World Championships
Gold medal – first place	2016 Saint Petersburg	49kg
Bronze medal – third place	2015 Saint Petersburg	52kg
Commonwealth Youth Games
Gold medal – first place	2017 Nassau	49kg

Sachin Siwach (born 6 December 1999) is an Indian amateur boxer fighting out of Bhiwani, Haryana. He is the third Indian to win gold at the World Youth Championships.

== Career ==
Siwach began boxing at the age of 10. His father, Kishan Kumar who is a farmer by profession, and mother, Nirmala Devi, encouraged him to pursue a career in boxing.

Siwach secured a place at Captain Hawa Singh Academy in Bhiwani, where he trained under the supervision of coach Sanjay Kumar. Kumar initially refused to enroll him into the academy because he was undernourished.

He won a gold medal in Commonwealth Youth Games in the Bahamas. He also won a gold medal in AIBA Youth World Boxing Championships in 2016. He became the third Indian to win gold at the World Youth Championship after Nanao Singh in 2008 and Vikas Krishan in 2010.

He won bronze medal at the AIBA Junior Boxing World Championship in Saint Petersburg, Russia in September 2015.

In 2017, he won a silver medal in the 49 kg category at Asian Youth Boxing Championship held in Bangkok. In 2018, at 19 years old, he competed in World Series of Boxing and defeated Russian debutanat Dorzho Radnaev in the light flyweight (49 kg) category.

He was named Asian Boxing Confederation's Best Youth Boxer of the year.

In 2019, he competed in the 52 kg category and was among the 6 semi-finalists in the 38th GeeBee Boxing Tournament in Helsinki, Finland.

Sachin Siwach won a gold medal in the 56 kg category at 2019 South Asian Games help in Kathmandu, Nepal.

== Achievements ==
- 2023: All India inter Railway Championship Gold
- 2020: BOCSKAI ISTVAN MEMORIAL International boxing Hungary Bronze
- 2019: India Open, Guwahati: Silver
- 2019: All India inter Railway Championship Gold
- 2019: GeeBee Boxing Tournament, Finland: Bronze
- 2018: All India inter Railway Championship Gold
- 2018: VI International Boxing Tournament President Cup Kazakhstan Bronze
- 2017: All india inter Railway Championship Gold
- 2017: Commonwealth Youth Games in Nassau, Bahamas: Gold
- 2017: Asian Youth Boxing Championship, Bangkok: silver
- 2016: Youth Boxing World Championships, St Petersburg, Russia: Gold
- 2015: AIBA Junior Boxing World Championships, St Petersburg, Russia: Bronze
- 2014: Federation Cup Boxing tournament: Gold
- 2012: Junior Nationals: Gold
- 2010: Haryana State championships, Wins Gold
