= Kyle Chen =

New Zealand boxer (born 2000)

- Born: Ting Chen; 20 December 2000 (age 25); Taipei, Taiwan
- Nationality: New Zealand; Taiwan
- Height: 186 cm (6 ft 1 in)
- Weight: 75 kg (165 lb; 11 st 11 lb)
- Division: Middleweight
- Style: Amateur Boxing
- Team: Kaeo Boxing Club; Northland Boxing Gym; Auckland Boxing Association
- Trainer: Rusty Porter

Amateur record
- Total: 50
- Wins: 43
- By knockout: 8
- Losses: 7
- By knockout: 1
- Draws: 0

Other information
- Occupation: Amateur Boxer

Ting Chen (born 20 December 2000 in Taipei, Taiwan) also known as Kyle Chen, is an amateur boxer residing from New Zealand. Chen has competed in New Zealand, Taiwan, Australia, Junior World Championship in Russia and Commonwealth Youth Games in Bahamas. Chen's most notable title is winning a bronze medal at the 2017 Commonwealth Youth Games.

== Cadet 2013 ==
Before going into boxing, Chen played rugby for his high school, but he decided to give boxing a go. He began his amateur boxing career in 2013, where he defeated Bocky Blackburn by TKO. Chen showed a lot of potential and decided to put all his focus onto amateur boxing. Later in 2013, Chen won a rematch against Blackburn, winning by Unanimous Decision and the Central North Island Boxing Championships. Chen won his first amateur title at the 2014 Golden Gloves where he competed as a novice, even though he had only competed in 5 bout so far in his career. He defeated 30 bout experience Xavier Hirini winning by spit decision. Chen went on to win multiple district titles including the Auckland Championship, Supercity Championship and more. At the Supercity Championship, 13 year old Chen competed against Caleb Glew, who is two years old then chen. Chen won the bout by unanimous decision. Chen went on to win the Central North Island Boxing Championships second year in a row, winning against Cole Downard by Unanimous Decision.

== Junior 2014–2016 ==
In 2014, Chen moved into the Junior division and went on to win the New Zealand Nationals. At the nationals Chen has victories over Ethan Bray and Maxwell Reti-Huch. After winning the New Zealand Nationals, Chen went on to compete at the Junior World Boxing Championship in Russia, reaching top 16. His father Murray Potts helped raise money for him to compete in Russia with the "Give a Little" website. Chen came back to New Zealand to win his second straight national title. With his dual citizenship, Chen was able to qualify for the 2015 Taiwan National championships and finish with gold.

In 2016, Chen received a scholarship to help progress his amateur boxing career. In mid 2016, Chen had a rematch which Southland's Jesse Hawken. The two last fought at the 2015 Nationals. A few months later, Chen traveled to Australia to be part of Golden Gloves Australia. Chen won all his bouts, defeating Rory Booth by unanimous decision, winning all the rounds. Chen went on to win his third straight New Zealand National title in a row in Rotorua. For the first time in his career, Chen skipped going to New Zealand Golden Gloves due to lack of opponents and instead went to Taiwan, to get his second win in Taiwan Nationals in a row.

== Youth 2017–present ==
In 2017, Chen officially moved from junior to the youth division. He attended an AIBA sponsored training camp that lasted over a week, to help prepare him for the 2018 Youth Olympics. Chen began his 2017 with a great start, despite being knocked down in the first round Chen won his first bout by Unanimous Decision. In his second bout of the year, Chen defeated an amateur boxer from Tonga by Unanimous decision at ABA Stadium. In May 2017, it was announced that Chen will be taking part in the 2017 Commonwealth Youth Games. Later in May, Chen traveled to Perth to take on Michael Martino. This raised a few eyebrows due to Chen still being 16 and Martino being 21. Chen won the bout by Points Decision. In early June 2017, Chen took part in the New Zealand North Island Golden Gloves Championship, going up against Junior World Championship bronze medalist Laszlo Szilard. Chen won the bout against Szilard by Unanimous Decision, taking Gold. In late June 2017, Chen took on amateur rival, the 2017 South Island Youth 75 kg Golden Gloves champion, Jesse Hawken at Regan Foley's tournament in Auckland, New Zealand. The two have fought twice so far in their career, once in 2015 and again in 2016, with Chen winning both bouts. Chen won the bout in Auckland by Unanimous Decision, with this being his last bout before heading to commonwealth youth games. Chen won his bout in the Commonwealth Youth Games against Australian Cullum James Adams. Chen was reported to fight while having a flu like infection, making the bout challenging and very close. Chen won his second bout against Welsh Jay Daniel Munn by a landslide. After a day of rest, Chen took on England boxer Aaron Patrick Bowen in his 50th amateur bout of his boxing career and in the semifinals of the tournament. Chen lost the bout by 4 - 1 Pts but still winning the bronze medal.

== Notable tournament results ==
=== 2015 Saint Petersburg AIBA Junior World Championship ===
==== Results ====
Men's (Junior Division) Welter (66 kg)

1. Round of 32 (1st Match): Kyle Chen, New Zealand (TKO 2nd Rnd 1:36) def Marius Denis Floraea, Romania
2. Round of 16 (2nd Match): Kyle Chen, New Zealand (1) Lost Aibek Akylbek Uulu, Kyrgyzstan (2)

=== 2017 Bahamas Commonwealth Youth Games ===
==== Results ====
Men's (Youth Division) Middle (75 kg)

1. Round of Preliminary (1st Match): Kyle Chen, New Zealand (2) def Callum James Adams, Australia (1)
2. Round of Quarterfinals (2nd Match):Kyle Chen, New Zealand (5) def Jay Daniel Munn, Wales (0)
3. Round of Semifinals (3rd Match):Kyle Chen, New Zealand (1) lost Aaron Patrick Bowen, England (4)

== Amateur titles ==
- Gold 2014 Auckland Light welterweight Championship (Cadet Male)
- Gold 2014 New Zealand Golden Gloves Welterweight Championship (Cadet Male)
- Gold 2014 AIBA New Zealand National Amateur Light welterweight Championship (Cadet Male)
- Top 16 2015 AIBA Junior world Welterweight Championship
- Gold 2015 New Zealand Golden Gloves Light middleweight Championship (Junior Male)
- Gold 2015 Taiwan National Amateur Light middleweight Championship (Junior Male)
- Gold 2015 AIBA New Zealand National Amateur Light middleweight Championship (Junior Male)
- Gold 2016 AIBA New Zealand National Amateur Middleweight Championship (Junior Male)
- Gold 2016 Australia Golden Gloves Middleweight Championship (Junior Male)
- Gold 2016 Taiwan National Amateur Middleweight Championship (Youth Male)
- Gold 2017 New Zealand Golden Gloves Middleweight Championship (Youth Male)
- Bronze 2017 Commonwealth Youth Games Middleweight Medal

== Awards ==
- 2014 Far North District Council Sports Award in boxing
- 2015 Far North District Council Sports Award in boxing
- 2016 Far North District Council Sports Award in boxing
- 2016 ASB Sporting Excellence Award
- 2017 ASB Northland Region Secondary Schools Sportsman of the year
- 2017 ASB Northland Region Sports Award in Boxing

== Filmography ==
Television series
Year	Title	Role	Notes
2011	What Now	Himself	Chatter ring Performer
2011	Chatter ring TV ad	Himself	Chatter ring Performer

== Personal life ==
Chen was born in Taiwan but moved to New Zealand when he turned 3 years old. Chen attended Kerikeri High School.
