= Beach soccer at the 2017 Commonwealth Youth Games =

Beach soccer at the 2018 Commonwealth Youth Games
- Venue: National Beach Soccer Arena
- Dates: July 19, 2017–July 22, 2017

The beach soccer competition at the 2017 Commonwealth Youth Games was held in Nassau, Bahamas from 19 to 22 July 2017 at the National Beach Soccer Arena, at Malcolm Park.

Two events took place, the boys' tournament and the girls' tournament. A total of eight teams from six countries took part; each consisting of ten players for a total of 80 competing athletes – 40 boys and 40 girls. All competitors were aged between 16 and 18.

Each respective event began with a round robin group stage. The teams in 1st and 2nd place advanced to the gold medal match. The teams in 3rd and 4th advanced to the bronze medal match. The boys' event was won by Saint Lucia and the girls event was won by Trinidad and Tobago.

== Medalists ==
| Event | Gold | Silver | Bronze |
|---|---|---|---|
| Boys | Saint Lucia | Trinidad and Tobago | Bahamas |
| Girls | Trinidad and Tobago | Jamaica | Turks and Caicos Islands |

== Medal table ==
| Rank | Nation | Gold | Silver | Bronze | Total |
|---|---|---|---|---|---|
| 1 | Trinidad and Tobago | 1 | 1 | 0 | 2 |
| 2 | Saint Lucia | 1 | 0 | 0 | 1 |
| 3 | Jamaica | 0 | 1 | 0 | 1 |
| 4 | Bahamas | 0 | 0 | 1 | 1 |
| 4 | Turks and Caicos Islands | 0 | 0 | 1 | 1 |
| Totals (5 entries) | | 2 | 2 | 2 | 6 |

== Results ==
=== Boys ===
2017 Commonwealth Youth Games Boys Beach Soccer Tournament
Tournament details
- Teams: 4
- Venue(s): 1 (in 1 host city)

Final positions
- Champions: Saint Lucia (1st title)
- Runners-up: Trinidad and Tobago
- Third place: Bahamas
- Fourth place: Antigua and Barbuda

Tournament statistics
- Matches played: 8
- Goals scored: 66 (8.25 per match)
- Top scorer(s): (Saint Lucia) Linus Clovis (7 goals)

==== Group stage ====
| Pos | Team | Pld | W | W+ | WP | L | GF | GA | GD | Pts | Qualification |
|---|---|---|---|---|---|---|---|---|---|---|---|
| 1 | Trinidad and Tobago | 3 | 2 | 0 | 1 | 0 | 14 | 11 | +3 | 7 | Gold medal match |
| 2 | Saint Lucia | 3 | 2 | 0 | 0 | 1 | 13 | 8 | +5 | 6 | Gold medal match |
| 3 | Bahamas (H) | 3 | 1 | 0 | 0 | 2 | 11 | 12 | –1 | 3 | Bronze medal match |
| 4 | Antigua and Barbuda | 3 | 0 | 0 | 0 | 3 | 11 | 18 | –7 | 0 | Bronze medal match |

(H) Hosts

| 19 July 2017 | Trinidad and Tobago | 6–6 (a.e.t.) (2–1 p) | Antigua and Barbuda |
| 18:30 |

| 19 July 2017 | Bahamas | 2–5 | Saint Lucia |
| 21:00 |

| 20 July 2017 | Trinidad and Tobago | 4–3 | Saint Lucia |
| 18:30 |

| 20 July 2017 | Bahamas | 7–3 | Antigua and Barbuda |
| 21:00 |

| 21 July 2017 | Saint Lucia | 5–2 | Antigua and Barbuda |
| 18:30 |

| 21 July 2017 | Bahamas | 2–4 | Trinidad and Tobago |
| 21:00 |

==== Bronze medal match ====
| 22 July 2017 | Bahamas | 5–4 | Antigua and Barbuda |
| 18:30 |

==== Gold medal match ====
| 22 July 2017 | Trinidad and Tobago | 2–6 | Saint Lucia |
| 21:00 |

=== Girls ===
2017 Commonwealth Youth Games Girls Beach Soccer Tournament
Tournament details
- Teams: 4
- Venue(s): 1 (in 1 host city)

Final positions
- Champions: Trinidad and Tobago (1st title)
- Runners-up: Jamaica
- Third place: Turks and Caicos Islands
- Fourth place: Bahamas

Tournament statistics
- Matches played: 8
- Goals scored: 77 (9.63 per match)
- Top scorer(s): (Jamaica) La-Tavia Russell (14 goals)

==== Group stage ====
| Pos | Team | Pld | W | W+ | WP | L | GF | GA | GD | Pts | Qualification |
|---|---|---|---|---|---|---|---|---|---|---|---|
| 1 | Jamaica | 3 | 3 | 0 | 0 | 0 | 31 | 6 | +25 | 9 | Gold medal match |
| 2 | Trinidad and Tobago | 3 | 1 | 0 | 1 | 1 | 13 | 13 | 0 | 4 | Gold medal match |
| 3 | Turks and Caicos Islands | 3 | 0 | 0 | 1 | 2 | 7 | 19 | –12 | 1 | Bronze medal match |
| 4 | Bahamas (H) | 3 | 0 | 0 | 0 | 3 | 11 | 24 | –13 | 0 | Bronze medal match |

(H) Hosts

| 19 July 2017 | Trinidad and Tobago | 5–2 | Turks and Caicos Islands |
| 17:15 |

| 19 July 2017 | Bahamas | 2–15 | Jamaica |
| 19:45 |

| 20 July 2017 | Trinidad and Tobago | 2–5 | Jamaica |
| 17:15 |

| 20 July 2017 | Bahamas | 3–3 (a.e.t.) (1–2 p) | Turks and Caicos Islands |
| 19:45 |

| 21 July 2017 | Turks and Caicos Islands | 2–11 | Jamaica |
| 17:15 |

| 21 July 2017 | Bahamas | 6–6 (a.e.t.) (1–2 p) | Trinidad and Tobago |
| 19:45 |

==== Bronze medal match ====
| 22 July 2017 | Turks and Caicos Islands | 3–1 | Bahamas |
| 17:15 |

==== Gold medal match ====
| 22 July 2017 | Jamaica | 5–6 | Trinidad and Tobago |
| 19:45 |
