= Shylah Waikai =

New Zealand boxer

- Born: Shylah Te Uranga Mariu Waikai; 27 August 2000 (age 26); Hamilton, New Zealand
- Nationality: New Zealand
- Height: 163 cm (5 ft 4 in)
- Weight: 51 kg (112 lb; 8 st 0 lb)
- Division: Flyweight
- Reach: 215 cm (84.6 in)
- Style: Amateur Boxing
- Team: Nerang PCYC
- Trainer: Damien O'Mara

Amateur record
- Total: 27
- Wins: 16
- Losses: 11
- Draws: 0

Other information
- Occupation: Amateur Boxer

Shylah Te Uranga Mariu Waikai (born 27 August 2000, Hamilton, New Zealand) is a New Zealand amateur boxer residing in Coomera, Queensland. Waikai biggest accomplishment so far in her career is winning the silver medal at the 2017 Commonwealth Youth Games in the Flyweight division. In October 2017, Waikai announced that she will be competing in the 2017 India AIBA Youth World Boxing Championships.

== Notable tournament results ==
=== 2017 Bahamas Commonwealth Youth Games ===
==== Results ====
Women's (Youth Division) Fly (51 kg)

1. Round of Preliminary (1st Match): Shylah Waikai, New Zealand (4) def Madumali Eranga Marappuli Henayale, Sri Lanka (1)
2. Round of Quarterfinals (2nd Match):Shylah Waikai, New Zealand (5) def Helena Ismael Bagao, Mozambique (0)
3. Round of Semifinals (3rd Match):Shylah Waikai, New Zealand (5) def Megan Elizabeth Gordon, Scotland (0)
4. Round of Finals (4th Match):Shylah Waikai, New Zealand (0) lost Chloe Louise Watson, England (5)

== Amateur titles ==
- 3 x Australian Golden Gloves Champion
- 4 x Queensland State Champion
- New Zealand National Champion
- Silver Medal 2017 Commonwealth Youth Games
