= 2017 FIFA Beach Soccer World Cup =

Tournament details
- Host country: Bahamas
- Dates: 27 April – 7 May
- Teams: 16 (from 6 confederations)
- Venue: 1 (in 1 host city)

Final positions
- Champions: Brazil (5th title)
- Runners-up: Tahiti
- Third place: Iran
- Fourth place: Italy

Tournament statistics
- Matches played: 32
- Goals scored: 266 (8.31 per match)
- Attendance: 57,450 (1,795 per match)
- Top scorer: (Italy) Gabriele Gori (17 goals)
- Best player: (Iran) Mohammad Ahmadzadeh
- Best goalkeeper: (Iran) Peyman Hosseini
- Fair play award: Brazil

The 2017 FIFA Beach Soccer World Cup was the ninth edition of the FIFA Beach Soccer World Cup, the premier international beach soccer championship contested by the men's national teams of the member associations of FIFA. Overall, this was the 19th edition of a world cup in beach soccer since the establishment of the Beach Soccer World Championships which ran from 1995 to 2004 but was not governed by FIFA. This was the fourth tournament to take place under the biennial basis; the World Cup now takes place once every two years, after taking place on a yearly basis until 2009.

FIFA originally started the bidding process in April 2013, whilst in December 2014, the Bahamas were appointed as hosts; this was the first time a men's senior FIFA tournament was hosted in the Caribbean, and the first FIFA tournament hosted by the Bahamas. Fifteen teams advanced through their respective preliminary continental qualification competitions, which started in September 2016 and ended in March 2017, to join the host team in the final tournament which included three nations making their debuts at the finals and notably saw two-time champions (in 2011 and 2013) Russia fail to qualify. The tournament was played from 27 April to 7 May 2017, with all 32 matches hosted in one 3,500 seater stadium, in the Bahamian capital, Nassau.

The hosts, making their first appearance at a World Cup, exited at the group stage. Portugal were the defending champions, but were eliminated by Brazil in the quarter-finals. Brazil ultimately went on to defeat Tahiti in the final to claim their fourteenth world title since the competition's inception in 1995, and their fifth title of the FIFA era, ending an eight-year wait after last winning the crown in 2009. Iran finished third to claim the best ever placing by an Asian nation in the history of the competition.

== Host selection ==
=== First bidding ===
On 17 April 2013, FIFA announced that bidding had begun for five competitions between 2016 and 2017, including the FIFA Beach Soccer World Cup. Declarations of interest were made by May 15 deadline whilst the hosts were scheduled to be revealed in December 2013.

The following 10 countries made an official bid for the World Cup, as revealed by FIFA on 28 May 2013.

- Argentina
- Bahrain
- Equatorial Guinea
- Estonia
- India
- Israel
- Mexico
- Seychelles
- South Africa
- Turkey

=== Second bidding ===
Due to undisclosed circumstances, FIFA did not pick a host from the first round of bidding by December 2013. And so on 6 March 2014, FIFA announced that bidding had re-opened for the 2017 FIFA Beach Soccer World Cup. New member associations interested in hosting submitted a declaration of interest by 15 April 2014, and provided the complete set of bidding documents by 1 October 2014.

The following 12 countries made official bids for hosting the tournament. Argentina were the only country to submit an entry in both rounds of bidding.

- Argentina
- (The Bahamas) Bahamas
- Brazil
- Cayman Islands
- Costa Rica
- Ecuador
- Egypt
- El Salvador
- Germany
- (Trinidad and Tobago) Trinidad & Tobago
- United Arab Emirates
- United States

On 19 December 2014, the FIFA Executive Committee announced the Bahamas as hosts.

== Qualification ==
Qualification began with the European qualifiers on 2 September 2016 and concluded with the final match of the AFC event on 11 March 2017. The hosts, the Bahamas, qualified automatically.

European nations usually receive five spots at the World Cup, and North American nations, two. However Since the Bahamas, as hosts, automatically qualified, taking one of the two North American two berths by default, it was decided by FIFA to transfer one spot from UEFA to CONCACAF to still allow two North American countries to qualify as normal, reducing the number of European berths to four.

=== African zone ===
The two African qualifiers were determined via the 2016 Africa Beach Soccer Cup of Nations (the first time the qualification event was held under the Africa Cup of Nations title after CAF upped their commitment to beach soccer in 2015). Eight nations took part in the finals between 13 and 18 December in Lagos, Nigeria, who qualified from a preliminary 14 team, two-legged play off event in August and September. Senegal ultimately proved victorious claiming their fourth African crown and fourth successive qualification to the World Cup. Runners-up and hosts Nigeria also qualified, their first qualification since 2011.

=== Asian zone ===
The qualifiers for members of the AFC took place in Kuala Terengganu, Malaysia between 4 and 11 March 2017. 14 teams originally entered but two (Myanmar and Uzbekistan) withdrew before the start of the tournament. Having never failed to qualify for a FIFA era World Cup, Japan narrowly progressed to the semi-finals of the competition as the best runner-up of the three groups in the group stage. Iran and the United Arab Emirates successfully won their semi finals to qualify for the World Cup (for the 7th and 5th time respectively), with Iran winning the final (their 2nd AFC title). Semi final losers Japan and Lebanon contested the final World Cup berth in the third place play off with the Japanese coming out on top to qualify.

=== European zone ===
The qualifiers for the members of UEFA took place between 2 and 11 September 2016 in Jesolo, Italy. A total of 28 teams entered into the tournament with the top four teams (the semi-finalists) qualifying for the World Cup finals. In a surprise result, Poland, ranked 12th in Europe prior to the competition, won the event and secured only their second qualification to a World Cup finals following their debut in 2006. The other successful qualifiers were runners-up Switzerland, third placed and defending World Champions Portugal who beat Italy, finishing fourth, the final qualifier. Poland's success in the second group stage caused a major upset by denying two time World Cup champions (2011 and 2013) Russia a berth at the finals for the first time since 2006. Three time World Cup runners-up (2003, 2004 and 2013) Spain also failed to qualify for just the second time since their debut in 1998.

=== North, Central American and Caribbean Zone ===
The North American qualification event took place between 20 and 26 February 2017 in Nassau, the Bahamas at the very stadium the World Cup would be hosted in. 16 teams took part contesting two qualification berths. In a surprise to all, Panama, in just their second CONCACAF Beach Soccer Championship appearance, beat all four historically dominant forces in North America on their way to winning the tournament (Costa Rica in the group stage, the United States in the quarter-finals, El Salvador in the semi-finals and defending champions Mexico in the final). As the finalists, Panama and Mexico qualified for the World Cup, the former for the first time (the first new North American World Cup debutants since 2009), the latter for the fifth time.

=== Oceanian zone ===
The 2017 OFC Beach Soccer Championship was originally scheduled to take place in February, however for undisclosed reasons, the tournament was cancelled. Due to their strong performances at the previous two World Cups, the OFC handpicked Tahiti to be the Oceanian representative at the 2017 World Cup (without having to qualify) in December 2015.

=== South American zone ===
Qualifiers for South America took place in Lambaré, Paraguay between 5 and 12 February 2017 with all 10 members of CONMEBOL taking part (the only qualification event to see all members of the respective confederation participate). With three berths available, finalists Brazil and hosts Paraguay secured their qualification by winning their respective semi finals. Brazil beat the Paraguayans in the final to win their sixth title. Ecuador beat Argentina on penalties in the third place play off to claim the final spot at the World Cup, their first qualification after missing out by one placing, finishing fourth, on three previous occasions. This condemned Argentina to their first absence from a World Cup since 2003, their first of the FIFA era, and missing just a third World Cup in total having first appeared in the maiden event in 1995.

== Qualified teams ==
The following 16 teams qualified for the final tournament. In addition to Bahamas who qualified automatically as hosts, the other 15 teams qualified from six separate continental competitions. The slot allocation was approved by the FIFA Executive Committee on 17 March 2016.

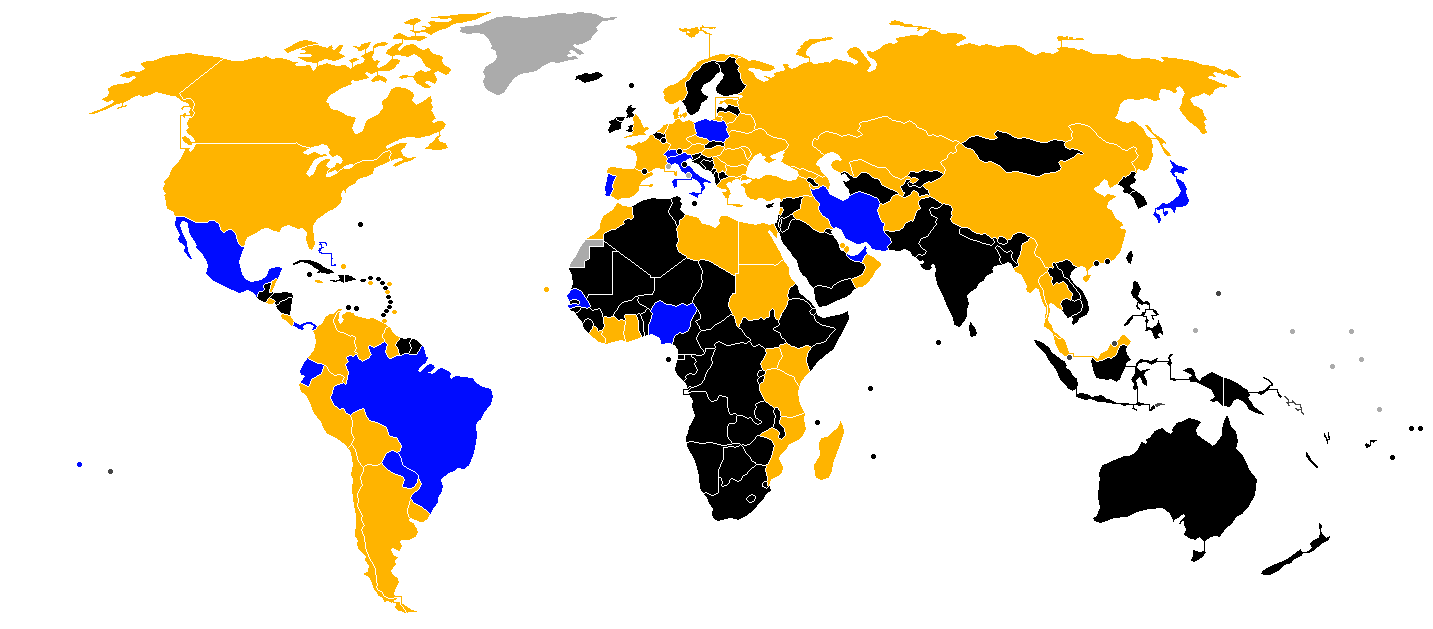
Qualified for World Cup finals Entered qualifying rounds but failed to qualify for World Cup finals (or withdrew) Did not enter the World Cup Not an associate member of FIFA

Confederation	Qualifying Tournament	Qualifier(s)
AFC (Asia)	2017 AFC Beach Soccer Championship	Iran; Japan; United Arab Emirates
CAF (Africa)	2016 Africa Beach Soccer Cup of Nations	Nigeria; Senegal
CONCACAF (North, Central America & Caribbean)	Host nation	Bahamas^{1}
CONCACAF (North, Central America & Caribbean)	2017 CONCACAF Beach Soccer Championship	Mexico; Panama^{1}
CONMEBOL (South America)	2017 CONMEBOL Beach Soccer Championship	Brazil; Ecuador^{1} Paraguay
OFC (Oceania)	Appointed by OFC (no qualifying tournament)	Tahiti
UEFA (Europe)	2017 FIFA Beach Soccer World Cup qualification (UEFA)	Italy; Poland; Portugal; Switzerland

1.Teams that will make their debut.

== Organisation ==
The official poster of the World Cup, featuring the design of the official match ball

The following were key milestones in the organisation of the tournament:

- The official emblem was unveiled on 28 July 2016.
- The match schedule was announced on 30 August 2016.
- The official match ball was revealed on 27 January 2017.
- The official song of the World Cup, Pure Good Vibes by Bahamian artist Rock Carey, was revealed alongside the draw on 28 February 2017.
- The FIFA Beach Soccer World Cup Bahamas 2017 Trophy Experience, touring the winners' trophy around five islands of the Bahamas between March and April 2017, was launched on 21 March 2017.
- To mark the 30-day countdown to the start of the tournament, the official promotional poster of the World Cup was unveiled by FIFA on 29 March 2017 at the National Beach Soccer Arena at Malcolm Park.
- FIFA's partners (Adidas, Coca-Cola, Gazprom, Kia Motors, Visa and WANDA) were the tournament's main sponsors along with national supporters in the Bahamas (BTC, Kalik Light and Scotiabank)
- A budget of US$7 million was approved for the tournament. In 2019, the final cost was reported over-budget at a total of US$9.93 million.

== Venue ==
One venue in the capital city of Nassau was used.

Nassau	Location of the host city of the 2017 FIFA Beach Soccer World Cup.
Nassau Stadium	Location of the host city of the 2017 FIFA Beach Soccer World Cup.
25°04′32.1″N 77°19′31.4″W	Location of the host city of the 2017 FIFA Beach Soccer World Cup.
Capacity: 3,500	Location of the host city of the 2017 FIFA Beach Soccer World Cup.

== Match officials ==
FIFA chose 24 officials from 24 different countries to referee matches at the World Cup, who were revealed on 31 March 2017. At least one referee was representing each of the six confederations: four from the AFC, three from CAF, five from CONMEBOL, three from CONCACAF, one from the OFC and eight from UEFA.

Confederation	Referees
AFC	(United Arab Emirates) Ebrahim Almansory
AFC	(Japan) Yuichi Hatano
AFC	(Uzbekistan) Bakhtiyor Namazov
AFC	(China) Shao Liang
CAF	(Tunisia) Issam Bousbih
CAF	(Madagascar) Said Hachim
CAF	(Nigeria) Jelili Ogunmuyiwa
CONCACAF	(Dominican Republic) Juan Angeles
CONCACAF	(El Salvador) Gonzalo Yurandir Carballo Perez
CONCACAF	(Guatemala) Miguel Lopez
CONMEBOL	(Uruguay) Pablo Marcelo Cadenasso Martinez
CONMEBOL	(Paraguay) Jorge Luis Martínez Pavón
CONMEBOL	(Brazil) Ivo Moraes
CONMEBOL	(Peru) Micke Palomino
CONMEBOL	(Argentina) Mariano Romo

Confederation	Referees
OFC	(Solomon Islands) Hugo Pado
UEFA
UEFA	(Lithuania) Laurynas Arzuolaitis
UEFA	(France) Sofien Benchabane
UEFA	(Latvia) Eduards Borisevics
UEFA	(Portugal) Sergio Filipe Gomes Soares
UEFA	(Estonia) Ago Kärtmann
UEFA	(Italy) Gionni Matticoli
UEFA	(Poland) Łukasz Ostrowski
UEFA	(Malta) Jude Amin Utulu

== Draw ==
The official draw was held on 28 February 2017, 20:00 EST (UTC−5), at the Atlantis Paradise Island Hotel in Nassau, Bahamas, in the attendance of the Bahamas Prime Minister, Perry Christie and CONCACAF General Secretary, Philippe Moggio. Former Brazilian association football international, Emerson and Miss Universe Bahamas 2016, Cherell Williamson, assisted the draw.

The 16 teams were drawn into four groups of four teams, with hosts Bahamas being allocated to position A1. The teams were seeded into their respective pots based on their BSWW Beach Soccer Rankings published on 27 February 2017, with the highest ranked teams placed into pot 1 alongside the hosts, the next highest ranked into pot 2 and so on. The identity of the AFC teams were not known at the time of the draw, so the three slots reserved for AFC teams were seeded based on the order in which they would finish in the 2017 AFC Beach Soccer Championship and not the world rankings, with the winners of the qualifiers going to pot 2, runners-up to pot 3 and third place team to pot 4. Teams from the same confederation could not be drawn against each other for the group stage.

Pot 1	Pot 2	Pot 3	Pot 4
Bahamas (Hosts – assigned to A1), (44); Portugal (1); Brazil (3); Italy (4)	Iran (5); Switzerland (6); Tahiti (7); Paraguay (9)	Mexico (10); Poland (14); Senegal (15); United Arab Emirates (19)	Japan (8); Nigeria (20); Ecuador (22); Panama (27)

Note: The numbers in parentheses are the world rankings of the accompanying teams prior to the draw

== Squads ==
Each team first named a preliminary squad of 18 players. From the preliminary squad, the team then named a final squad of 12 players (two of whom had to be goalkeepers) by the FIFA deadline of 20 April 2017. Players in the final squad may be replaced due to serious injury up to 24 hours prior to kickoff of the team's first match.

== Group stage ==
Each team earns three points for a win in regulation time, two points for a win in extra time, one point for a win in a penalty shoot-out, and no points for a defeat. The top two teams of each group advance to the quarter-finals.

All times are local, EDT (UTC−4).

=== Tiebreakers ===
The rankings of teams in each group are determined as follows (regulations Article 18.5):

1. points obtained in all group matches;

If two or more teams are equal on the basis of the above criterion, their rankings are determined as follows:

2. points obtained in the group matches between the teams concerned;
3. goal difference in the group matches between the teams concerned;
4. number of goals scored in the group matches between the teams concerned;
5. goal difference in all group matches;
6. number of goals scored in all group matches;
7. fair play points
  - first yellow card: minus 1 point;
  - indirect red card (second yellow card): minus 3 points;
  - direct red card: minus 4 points;
  - yellow card and direct red card: minus 5 points;
8. drawing of lots by the FIFA Organising Committee.

=== Group A ===
Pos	Team	Pld	W	W+	WP	L	GF	GA	GD	Pts	Qualification
1	Switzerland	3	2	0	1	0	18	13	+5	7	Knockout stage
2	Senegal	3	2	0	0	1	25	7	+18	6	Knockout stage
3	Bahamas (H)	3	1	0	0	2	7	14	−7	3	
4	Ecuador	3	0	0	0	3	6	22	−16	0	

Source: FIFA
Rules for classification: Group stage tiebreakers
(H) Host
27 April 2017
17:00

Ecuador	0–9	Senegal
	Report	Diagne 6', 17'; Barry 7', 9', 21'; Ndoye 15', 34'; Diassy 24'; Balde 25'

Nassau Stadium, Nassau
Attendance: 650
Referee: Ebrahim Almansory (United Arab Emirates)
27 April 2017
20:00

Bahamas	2–3	Switzerland
St. Fleur 1'; Christie 31'	Report	Ott 6'; Hodel 13', 27'

Nassau Stadium, Nassau
Attendance: 3,300
Referee: Issam Bousbih (Tunisia)

29 April 2017
17:00

Switzerland	9–5	Ecuador
M. Jaeggy 7'; Stankovic 8', 15', 33'; Ott 10', 10', 18', 23'; Werder 10'	Report	Bailon 15'; Cedeno 16', 22'; Delgado 21'; Gallegos 23'

Nassau Stadium, Nassau
Attendance: 1,700
Referee: Juan Angeles (Dominican Republic)
29 April 2017
20:00

Senegal	10–1	Bahamas
Sylla 1'; Balde 2', 3', 21'; Diagne 5'; Diassy 8'; Ndoye 26', 30'; Diouf 34', 34'	Report	Christie 17' (pen.)

Nassau Stadium, Nassau
Attendance: 3,500
Referee: Yuichi Hatano (Japan)

1 May 2017
17:00

Switzerland	6–6 (a.e.t.)	Senegal
Hodel 4'; Stankovic 23' (pen.), 24', 31'; Werder 28'; Spacca 39'	Report	Fall 2'; Balde 13'; Diagne 18', 32'; Ndoye 25'; Ndour 38'
Penalties
M. Jaeggy (penalty scored); Hodel (penalty scored); Stankovic (penalty scored)	3–1	(penalty scored) Barry; (penalty missed) Diagne

Nassau Stadium, Nassau
Attendance: 1,500
Referee: Micke Palomino (Peru)
1 May 2017
20:00

Bahamas	4–1	Ecuador
Francois 19', 33'; St. Fleur 22'; Williams 34'	Report	Moreira 29'

Nassau Stadium, Nassau
Attendance: 3,400
Referee: Hugo Pado (Solomon Islands)

=== Group B ===
Pos	Team	Pld	W	W+	WP	L	GF	GA	GD	Pts	Qualification
1	Italy	3	3	0	0	0	25	11	+14	9	Knockout stage
2	Iran	3	1	0	1	1	11	11	0	4	Knockout stage
3	Nigeria	3	0	1	0	2	15	20	−5	2	
4	Mexico	3	0	0	0	3	7	16	−9	0	

Source: FIFA
Rules for classification: Group stage tiebreakers
27 April 2017
15:30

Iran	3–2	Mexico
Hosseini 20'; Akbari 29'; Ahmadzadeh 31'	Report	Mosco 21'; Maldonado 25'

Nassau Stadium, Nassau
Attendance: 400
Referee: Łukasz Ostrowski (Poland)
27 April 2017
18:30

Nigeria	6–12	Italy
Abu 2', 28', 35'; Godspower 6'; Tale 22'; Emeka 23'	Report	Palmacci 2', 31', 31'; Zurlo 9'; Gori 19', 21', 23', 29', 29', 32'; Di Palma 23'; Chiavaro 35'

Nassau Stadium, Nassau
Attendance: 1,600
Referee: Miguel Lopez (Guatemala)

29 April 2017
15:30

Italy	5–4	Iran
Gori 8', 26'; Corisiniti 29'; Ramacciotti 29', 34'	Report	Akbari 9'; Ahmadzadeh 11'; Mesigar 18'; Mokhtari 36'

Nassau Stadium, Nassau
Attendance: 1,200
Referee: Ivo Moraes (Brazil)
29 April 2017
18:30

Mexico	4–5 (a.e.t.)	Nigeria
Villa 8'; A. Rodríguez 15'; Maldonado 16' (pen.); Mosco 39'	Report	Emeka 15'; Abu 20', 39'; Tale 35'; Godspower 37'

Nassau Stadium, Nassau
Attendance: 2,600
Referee: Sergio Filipe Gomes Soares (Portugal)

1 May 2017
15:30

Italy	8–1	Mexico
Di Palma 3'; Zurlo 17'; Palmacci 17', 26'; Gori 20', 24', 31'; Ramacciotti 34'	Report	Maldonado 35'

Nassau Stadium, Nassau
Attendance: 500
Referee: Shao Liang (China)
1 May 2017
18:30

Nigeria	4–4 (a.e.t.)	Iran
Tale 15' (pen.); Emmanuel 19'; Godspower 22'; Ibenegbu 33'	Report	Ahmadzadeh 8', 21'; Mokhtari 16', 33'
Penalties
Tale (penalty missed); Ibenegbu (penalty scored); Ogodo (penalty missed)	1–2	(penalty missed) Boulokbashi; (penalty scored) Nazem; (penalty scored) Akbari

Nassau Stadium, Nassau
Attendance: 1,900
Referee: Laurynas Arzuolaitis (Lithuania)

=== Group C ===
Pos	Team	Pld	W	W+	WP	L	GF	GA	GD	Pts	Qualification
1	Paraguay	3	2	0	0	1	12	8	+4	6	Knockout stage
2	Portugal	3	1	1	0	1	12	6	+6	5	Knockout stage
3	United Arab Emirates	3	1	0	1	1	6	6	0	4	
4	Panama	3	0	0	0	3	4	14	−10	0	

Source: FIFA
Rules for classification: Group stage tiebreakers
28 April 2017
17:00

Portugal	7–0	Panama
Torres 3'; Leo Martins 5', 28'; Coimbra 6'; José Maria 13', 32'; Belchior 31'	Report

Nassau Stadium, Nassau
Attendance: 700
Referee: Jelili Ogunmuyiwa (Nigeria)
28 April 2017
20:00

United Arab Emirates	3–2	Paraguay
Haitham 5', 12'; W. Beshr 25'	Report	Carballo 9', 29'

Nassau Stadium, Nassau
Attendance: 1,900
Referee: Ago Kaertmann (Estonia)

30 April 2017
17:00

Paraguay	5–3	Portugal
Rolon 4'; Moran 16', 31'; Lopez 27'; Carballo 27'	Report	Jordan 11', 18'; Alan 34'

Nassau Stadium, Nassau
Attendance: 1,450
Referee: Said Hachim (Madagascar)
30 April 2017
20:00

Panama	2–2 (a.e.t.)	United Arab Emirates
Galvez 2'; Arrocha 2'	Report	Walid 1', 9'
Penalties
R. Garcia (penalty scored); Bultron (penalty scored); E. Garcia (penalty missed); Watson (penalty missed)	2–3	(penalty scored) Haitham; (penalty missed) W. Beshr; (penalty scored) A. Beshr; (penalty scored) Ali Karim

Nassau Stadium, Nassau
Attendance: 1,300
Referee: Pablo Marcelo Cadenasso Martinez (Uruguay)

2 May 2017
17:00

Paraguay	5–2	Panama
Villaverde 1'; Benitez 5'; Zayas 10'; Carballo 25'; Moran 30'	Report	Watson 9'; Rangel 27'

Nassau Stadium, Nassau
Attendance: 600
Referee: Sofien Benchabane (France)
2 May 2017
20:00

United Arab Emirates	1–2 (a.e.t.)	Portugal
Karim 36'	Report	Belchior 19'; Bruno Novo 37'

Nassau Stadium, Nassau
Attendance: 1,700
Referee: Gonzalo Yurandir Carballo Perez (El Salvador)

=== Group D ===
Pos	Team	Pld	W	W+	WP	L	GF	GA	GD	Pts	Qualification
1	Brazil	3	3	0	0	0	20	8	+12	9	Knockout stage
2	Tahiti	3	2	0	0	1	13	11	+2	6	Knockout stage
3	Japan	3	1	0	0	2	15	17	−2	3	
4	Poland	3	0	0	0	3	12	24	−12	0	

Source: FIFA
Rules for classification: Group stage tiebreakers
28 April 2017
15:30

Japan	9–4	Poland
Goto 4', 5', 18', 22', 27'; Oba 16' (pen.); Iino 22'; Yamauchi 23', 30'	Report	Jesionowski 18'; Saganowski 19', 26'; Ziober 36'

Nassau Stadium, Nassau
Attendance: 400
Referee: Mariano Romo (Argentina)
28 April 2017
18:30

Brazil	4–1	Tahiti
Filipe 5'; Bruno Xavier 7'; Catarino 13', 29'	Report	Tepa 3'

Nassau Stadium, Nassau
Attendance: 2,000
Referee: Gionni Matticoli (Italy)

30 April 2017
15:30

Tahiti	4–3	Japan
Labaste 4'; Tavanae 26'; Tepa 28'; Li Fung Kuee 35'	Report	Akaguma 26', 31', 34'

Nassau Stadium, Nassau
Attendance: 1,500
Referee: Eduards Borisevics (Latvia)
30 April 2017
18:30

Poland	4–7	Brazil
Jesionowski 3', 34'; Saganowski 32', 36' (pen.)	Report	Lucao 6'; Catarino 20', 31'; Rodrigo 24'; Fernando 26', 34'; Mauricinho 36'

Nassau Stadium, Nassau
Attendance: 2,500
Referee: Bakhtiyor Namazov (Uzbekistan)

2 May 2017
15:30

Tahiti	8–4	Poland
Li Fung Kuee 2', 36'; Tavanae 4', 34'; Tepa 7'; Tchen 12'; N. Bennett 13', 18'	Report	Lenart 22'; Kubiak 27' (pen.); R. Bennett 31' (o.g.); Jesionowski 34'

Nassau Stadium, Nassau
Attendance: 500
Referee: Jorge Luis Martínez Pavón (Paraguay)
2 May 2017
18:30

Brazil	9–3	Japan
Goto 5' (o.g.); Rodrigo 6', 17', 23', 28', 36'; Mauricinho 20', 35'; Catarino 21'	Report	Oba 10'; Goto 12'; Bokhinha 22' (o.g.)

Nassau Stadium, Nassau
Attendance: 2,000
Referee: Jude Amin Utulu (Malta)

== Knockout stage ==
=== Bracket ===
Quarter-finals
4 May – Nassau
Switzerland	3
Iran (a.e.t.)	4
4 May – Nassau
Paraguay	4
Tahiti	6
4 May – Nassau
Italy	5
Senegal	1
4 May – Nassau
Brazil	4
Portugal	3

Semi-finals
6 May – Nassau
Iran	1 (2)
Tahiti (p)	1 (3)
6 May – Nassau
Italy	4
Brazil	8

Final
7 May – Nassau
Tahiti	0
Brazil	6
Third place
7 May – Nassau
Iran	5
Italy	3

=== Quarter-finals ===
4 May 2017
15:30

Paraguay	4–6	Tahiti
Fernandez 15'; Moran 18', 24'; Zayas 36'	Report	Torohia 9'; N. Bennett 12'; Taiarui 19'; Labaste 29'; Tavanae 36'; Tepa 36'

Nassau Stadium, Nassau
Attendance: 700
Referee: Laurynas Arzuolaitis (Lithuania)

4 May 2017
17:00

Brazil	4–3	Portugal
Catarino 1'; Datinha 19' (pen.), 21'; Rodrigo 34'	Report	Torres 1'; Jordan 12', 30'

Nassau Stadium, Nassau
Attendance: 1,750
Referee: Bakhtiyor Namazov (Uzbekistan)

4 May 2017
18:30

Switzerland	3–4 (a.e.t.)	Iran
Stankovic 17'; Hodel 18', 23'	Report	Ahmadzadeh 4', 14'; Nazem 36'; Mokhtari 39'

Nassau Stadium, Nassau
Attendance: 2,500
Referee: Gionni Matticoli (Italy)

4 May 2017
20:00

Italy	5–1	Senegal
Gori 2' (pen.), 23', 27' (pen.); Marrucci 21'; Frainetti 25'	Report	Balde 34' (pen.)

Nassau Stadium, Nassau
Attendance: 2,500
Referee: Mariano Romo (Argentina)

=== Semi-finals ===
6 May 2017
15:00

Iran	1–1 (a.e.t.)	Tahiti
Nazem 19'	Report	Tepa 32'
Penalties
Nazem (penalty scored); Mokhtari (penalty scored); Akbari (penalty missed); Ahmadzadeh (penalty missed); Kiani (penalty missed); Behzadpour (penalty missed)	2–3	(penalty scored) N. Bennett; (penalty missed) Teriitau; (penalty scored) Li Fung Kuee; (penalty missed) Labaste; (penalty missed) Tepa; (penalty scored) R. Bennett

Nassau Stadium, Nassau
Attendance: 1,800
Referee: Eduards Borisevics (Latvia)

6 May 2017
16:30

Italy	4–8	Brazil
Marrucci 2'; Ramacciotti 9'; Gori 26' (pen.); Corosiniti 26'	Report	Mauricinho 2', 15', 19'; Rodrigo 9'; Catarino 12'; Lucão 12'; Mão 22'; Bokinha 26'

Nassau Stadium, Nassau
Attendance: 3,450
Referee: Said Hachim (Madagascar)

=== Third place match ===
7 May 2017
15:00

Iran	5–3	Italy
Ahmadzadeh 3', 14', 36' (pen.); Mokhtari 19'; Mesigar 30'	Report	26', 29' Gori; 33' Ramacciotti

Nassau Stadium, Nassau
Attendance: 2,500
Referee: Ivo Moras (Brazil)

=== Final ===
7 May 2017
16:30

Tahiti	0–6	Brazil
	Report	Mauricinho 1', 18'; Datinha 7'; Catarino 30'; Daniel 32', 33'

Nassau Stadium, Nassau
Attendance: 3,500
Referee: Bakhtiyor Namazov (Uzbekistan)

== Awards ==
In the aftermath of the final at 18:00 local time, FIFA presented individual awards to the three best players of the tournament, three top goal scorers, and to the best goalkeeper. In addition, a collective award was given to the team with the most points in the Fair Play ranking. Following this, this winners trophy was awarded to Brazil, the champions of this year's World Cup.

When deciding the scoring awards, players tied with the same number of goals scored were then split based on the number of assists the tied players in question provided during the tournament, with the player with more assists ranked higher than the other. In this case, Rodrigo and Ahmadzadeh were tied on nine goals each. However Rodrigo had three assists to Ahmadzadeh's one and so were ranked accordingly.

=== Winners ===
2017 FIFA Beach Soccer World Cup
Champions

Brazil
5th title
14th world title

=== Individual awards ===
adidas Golden Ball	adidas Silver Ball	adidas Bronze Ball
(Iran) Mohammad Ahmadzadeh	(Brazil) Mauricinho	(Brazil) Datinha
adidas Golden Scorer	adidas Silver Scorer	adidas Bronze Scorer
(Italy) Gabriele Gori	(Brazil) Rodrigo	(Iran) Mohammad Ahmadzadeh
17 goals	9 goals	9 goals
adidas Golden Glove
(Iran) Peyman Hosseini
FIFA Fair Play Award
Brazil
Goal of the tournament
(Iran) Peyman Hosseini vs. Mexico

== Statistics ==
=== Goalscorers ===
Top goalscorer, Gabriele Gori, recorded the second highest number of goals ever scored in a World Cup with 17 and became the first Italian of the FIFA era to be top scorer (Alessandro Altobelli was top scorer in the pre-FIFA era in 1995 and 1996). Notably Madjer (who holds the record for the highest number of goals scored at a single World Cup (21 in 2006) and the highest tally of goals overall in the FIFA era at 87) failed to score even a single goal at a World Cup finals for the very first time.

Former Golden Boot winner, Dejan Stankovic, scored his highest number of goals (seven) since winning the award with 16 in 2009. The winner of the Golden Boot in the last edition, Pedro Moran (who won the award with eight goals) scored five goals this time around.

There was a total of 103 scorers in this year's World Cup.

17 goals

- (Italy) Gabriele Gori

9 goals

- (Iran) Mohammad Ahmadzadeh
- (Brazil) Rodrigo

8 goals

- (Brazil) Mauricinho
- (Brazil) Catarino

7 goals

- (Switzerland) Dejan Stankovic

6 goals

- (Senegal) Ibrahima Balde
- (Japan) Takasuke Goto

5 goals

- (Senegal) Papa Ndoye
- (Italy) Dario Ramacciotti
- (Switzerland) Noel Ott
- (Italy) Paolo Palmacci
- (Paraguay) Pedro Moran
- (Nigeria) Abu Azeez
- (Switzerland) Glenn Hodel
- (French Polynesia) Patrick Tepa
- (Iran) Mohammad Mokhtari
- (Senegal) Mamour Diagne

4 goals

- (Poland) Boguslaw Saganowski
- (French Polynesia) Heiarii Tavanae
- (Portugal) Jordan Santos
- (Poland) Jakub Jesionowski
- (Paraguay) Carlos Carballo

3 goals

- (Mexico) Ramon Maldonado
- (French Polynesia) Naea Bennett
- (Nigeria) Godspower Igudia
- (Nigeria) Victor Tale
- (Japan) Takuya Akaguma
- (Senegal) Hamidou Barry
- (French Polynesia) Raimana Li Fung Kuee
- (Brazil) Datinha

2 goals

- (The Bahamas) Gavin Christie
- (United Arab Emirates) Haitham Mohamed
- (Nigeria) Emeka Ogbonna
- (United Arab Emirates) Walid Mohammad
- (Portugal) Ze Maria
- (Paraguay) Orlando Zayas
- (Italy) Matteo Marrucci
- (Brazil) Daniel
- (Brazil) Lucao
- (Italy) Francesco Corosiniti
- (Portugal) Bruno Torres
- (Portugal) Belchior
- (Ecuador) Daniel Cedeno
- (Senegal) Hamad Diouf
- (Japan) Takaaki Oba
- (Mexico) Benjamin Mosco
- (Senegal) Lansana Diassy
- (Switzerland) Nicola Werder
- (The Bahamas) Jean Francois
- (Italy) Michele Di Palma
- (Iran) Ali Nazem
- (Portugal) Leo Martins
- (The Bahamas) Lesly St. Fleur
- (Iran) Moslem Mesigar
- (Japan) Shusei Yamauchi
- (French Polynesia) Tearii Labaste
- (Italy) Emmanuele Zurlo
- (Iran) Amir Akbari

1 goal

- (Mexico) Abdiel Villa
- (Brazil) Bruno Xavier
- (Switzerland) Mo Jaeggy
- (Brazil) Fernando
- (Ecuador) Joffre Delgado
- (Poland) Konrad Kubiak
- (Panama) Pascual Galvez
- (The Bahamas) Kyle Williams
- (Poland) Witold Ziober
- (Ecuador) Cristhian Gallegos
- (Ecuador) Segundo Moreira
- (Ecuador) Jorge Bailon
- (Panama) Julio Watson
- (Brazil) Filipe
- (French Polynesia) Angelo Tchen
- (French Polynesia) Heimanu Taiarui
- (Panama) Justo Arrocha
- (Portugal) Coimbra
- (Nigeria) Emmanuel Ohwoferia
- (Panama) Gilberto Rangel
- (Brazil) Mão
- (French Polynesia) Jonathan Torohia
- (Senegal) Babacar Fall
- (Paraguay) Juan Lopez
- (Brazil) Bokinha
- (Paraguay) Jesus Rolon
- (Switzerland) Sandro Spaccarotella
- (Poland) Tomasz Lenart
- (United Arab Emirates) Ali Karim
- (Paraguay) Ivan Fernandez
- (United Arab Emirates) Waleed Beshr
- (Portugal) Alan Cavalcanti
- (Paraguay) Sergio Villaverde
- (Italy) Alessio Frainetti
- (Paraguay) Gustavo Benitez
- (Portugal) Bruno Novo
- (Senegal) Papa Ndour
- (Iran) Peyman Hosseini
- (Nigeria) Bartholomew Ibenegbu
- (Senegal) Mamadou Sylla
- (Italy) Alfioluca Chiavaro
- (Japan) Tomoyuki Iino
- (Mexico) Angel Rodriguez

Own goals

- (French Polynesia) Raimoana Bennett (vs. Poland)
- (Japan) Takasuke Goto (vs. Brazil)
- (Brazil) Bokhinha (vs. Japan)

Source: FIFA

=== Discipline ===
Summary of statistics

- Total number of yellow cards: 58
  Average yellow cards per match: 1.81
- Total number of red cards: 3
  Average red cards per match: 0.09
- First yellow card of the tournament:
  Angel Rodriguez for Mexico against Iran
- First red card of the tournament:
  Al Seyni Ndiaye for Senegal against Switzerland
- Most cards issued (match): 7 (7 yellow, 0 red)
  Tahiti v Poland
- Fewest cards issued (match): 0
  Brazil v Tahiti, Portugal v Panama, Panama v United Arab Emirates, Paraguay v Portugal, Nigeria v Iran, Paraguay v Panama, Switzerland v Iran, Tahiti v Brazil
- Most yellow cards (team): 10
  Poland
- Most red cards (team): 1
  Senegal, Paraguay, Italy
- Fewest yellow cards (team): 0
  United Arab Emirates, Panama
- Most fouls committed (team, per game): 10
  Poland
- Most fouls suffered (team, per game): 9
  Italy
- Fewest fouls committed (team, per game): 4
  United Arab Emirates
- Fewest fouls suffered (team, per game): 2
  Mexico
- Most fouls committed causing a penalty (team, total): 5
  Senegal
- Fewest fouls committed causing a penalty (team, total): 0
  Panama, Switzerland, United Arab Emirates,
  Bahamas, Mexico

Most yellow cards received (yellow card) (2)

- (The Bahamas) Gary Joseph
- (Poland) Witold Ziober
- (Poland) Dominik Depta
- (Portugal) Bruno Torres
- (Senegal) Papa Ndoye
- (Italy) Paolo Palmacci
- (French Polynesia) Heimanu Taiarui

Second yellow cards received (yellow card) (yellow-red card) (1)

- (Italy) Dario Ramacciotti

Red cards received (red card) (1)

- (Paraguay) Juan Lopez
- (Senegal) Al Seyni Ndiaye

Sources: FIFA (team), FIFA (player)

=== Final standings ===
Pos	Grp	Team	Pld	W	W+	WP	L	GF	GA	GD	Pts	Final result
1	D	Brazil	6	6	0	0	0	38	15	+23	18	Champions
2	D	Tahiti	6	3	0	1	2	20	22	−2	10	Runners-up
3	B	Iran	6	2	1	1	2	21	18	+3	9	Third place
4	B	Italy	6	4	0	0	2	37	25	+12	12	Fourth place
5	A	Switzerland	4	2	0	1	1	21	17	+4	7	Eliminated in Quarter-finals
6	A	Senegal	4	2	0	0	2	26	12	+14	6	Eliminated in Quarter-finals
7	C	Paraguay	4	2	0	0	2	16	14	+2	6	Eliminated in Quarter-finals
8	C	Portugal	4	1	1	0	2	15	10	+5	5	Eliminated in Quarter-finals
9	C	United Arab Emirates	3	1	0	1	1	6	6	0	4	Eliminated in Group stage
10	D	Japan	3	1	0	0	2	15	17	−2	3	Eliminated in Group stage
11	A	Bahamas (H)	3	1	0	0	2	7	14	−7	3	Eliminated in Group stage
12	B	Nigeria	3	0	1	0	2	15	20	−5	2	Eliminated in Group stage
13	B	Mexico	3	0	0	0	3	7	16	−9	0	Eliminated in Group stage
14	C	Panama	3	0	0	0	3	4	14	−10	0	Eliminated in Group stage
15	D	Poland	3	0	0	0	3	12	24	−12	0	Eliminated in Group stage
16	A	Ecuador	3	0	0	0	3	6	22	−16	0	Eliminated in Group stage

Source: FIFA
(H) Host

== Broadcasting rights ==
The following table is a summary of some notable and participating countries' broadcasting licensee holders.

Territory	Broadcaster Licensees	Ref
Albania	RTSH	
Argentina	DirecTV Latin America	
Armenia	ARMTV	
Australia	SBS	
Austria	ORF	
Azerbaijan	İTV	
Belarus	BTRC	
Belgium	VRT, RTBF	
Bosnia and Herzegovina	BHRT	
Brazil	SporTV, Band	
Bulgaria	BNT	
Canada	TSN	
Caribbean (Note: The FIFA/DirecTV deal covers the rights in 27 countries)	DirecTV	
Chile	Canal 13, TVN, Mega	
Croatia	HRT	
Cyprus	CyBC	
Czech Republic	Czech Television	
Ecuador	DirecTV Latin America, RTS	
Estonia	ERR	
Europe (Note: The FIFA/Eurosport deal covers the rights in all 52 European countries, bar Kazakhstan. The other individual European countries listed show the additional broadcasting licenses in those countries.)	Eurosport	
Georgia	GPB	
Hungary	MTVA	
Iceland	RÚV	
Indian subcontinent (Note: The FIFA/Sony deal covers the rights in 7 countries)	Sony Pictures Networks India	
Iran	IRIB TV3, IRIB Varzesh	
Ireland	RTÉ	
Israel	IBA	
Japan	Fuji Television	
Kosovo	RTK	
Latvia	LTV	
Lithuania	LRT	
Macedonia	MRT	
Malaysia & Brunei	Astro	
Malta	PBS	
Mexico	Televisa, Azteca	
Middle East and North Africa (Note: The FIFA/beIN Sports Arabia deal covers the rights in 13 countries of the Arab League)	BeIN Sports MENA	
Moldova	TRM	
Netherlands	NOS	
New Zealand	Sky Sports	
Panama	TVN, SKY, RPC TV Canal 4	
Philippines	ABS-CBN	
Poland	Telewizja Polska	
Portugal	RTP	
Romania	TVR	
Serbia	RTS	
Sub-Saharan Africa (Note: The FIFA/Econet deal covers the rights in 42 countries)	Econet Media	
Slovakia	RTVS	
Slovenia	RTVSLO	
Switzerland	SRG SSR	
Turkey	TRT	
Uruguay	Saeta TV Channel 10, Teledoce, Monte Carlo TV	
United States	Fox Sports, Telemundo	
Venezuela	Meridiano Television	
