= Madeleine Fasnacht =

Australian cyclist (born 1999)

Personal information
- Born: 17 October 1999 (age 27) Hobart, Australia
- Height: 165 cm (5 ft 5 in)

Cycling career
- Sport: Cycling
- Current team: TIS Racing Team
- Discipline: Road
- Role: Rider
- Rider type: Climber, Time trialist

Amateur team
- 2016-: TIS Racing Team

Madeleine Fasnacht (born 17 October 1999) is an Australian cyclist, who made the switch from long-distance running and triathlon in mid-2015 to road racing due to medical conditions that hampered her running.

== Major results ==
2016
1st National U19 Road Race Championships
2nd National U19 Time Trial Championships
9th Women's Junior Time Trial, UCI Road World Championships
2017
1st Time Trial, Commonwealth Youth Games
1st Junior Time Trial, Oceania Road Championships
1st National U19 Time Trial Championships
1st National U19 Road Race Championships
3rd Junior Time Trial, UCI Road World Championships
3rd Junior Road Race, Commonwealth Youth Games
3rd Junior Time Trial, Oceania Road Championships
4th National U19 Criterium Championships
