= 2027 Commonwealth Youth Games =

Youth sporting event in Malta

- Host city: Malta
- Nations: 74 (expected)
- Athletes: 1,200 (expected)
- Events: 116 in 8 sports
- Opening: 29 October 2027
- Closing: 4 November 2027
- Opened by: President Myriam Spiteri Debono (expected)
- Main venue: Matthew Micallef St. John Athletics Stadium
- Ceremony venue: National Stadium, Ta' Qali

The 2027 Commonwealth Youth Games, officially known as the VIII Commonwealth Youth Games and informally as Malta 2027, will be a youth sporting event for members of the Commonwealth that will be held in Malta. It will be the first time that Malta hosts the Commonwealth Games. It will be the third Commonwealth Youth Games event to be held in Europe, following the inaugural 2000 Commonwealth Youth Games in Edinburgh, Scotland and the 2011 Commonwealth Youth Games in Douglas, Isle of Man. The Games will run from 29 October 2027 to 4 November 2027.

== The Games ==
=== Host selection and preparations ===
On 31 July 2025, Malta was selected as the host for the Commonwealth Youth Games during the launch event at Verdala Palace in Buskett.

In March 2026, the dates and venues of the Games were announced. The edition will feature the largest para sport programme in Youth Games history, similar to the 2026 Commonwealth Games in Glasgow.

=== Venues ===
- Cottonera Indoor Pool, Cospicua – 4×4 water polo
- Tal-Qroqq National Pool, Msida – Swimming and para swimming
- Matthew Micallef St. John Athletics Stadium, Marsa – Ceremonies, athletics, para athletics
- Marsa Sports Centre, Marsa – Squash and weightlifting
- Mellieħa Bay, Mellieħa – Sailing
- Gozo Indoor Sports Pavilion, Victoria – Netball
- Marsalforn Bay, Marsalforn – Triathlon

== Sports ==
Sailing and 4×4 water polo will make their Commonwealth Youth Games will be part of the program for the first time alongside the other sports: Athletics, netball, squash, swimming, triathlon, and weightlifting.Two paralympic events will be held in athletics and swimming.

- Athletics (28)
  - Para-athletics (16)
- Netball (1)
- Sailing (4)
- Squash (5)
- Swimming (37)
  - Para swimming (8)
- Triathlon (3)
- Water polo (2)
- Weightlifting (12)

== Participating associations ==
Of the 74 Commonwealth Games Association eligible to participate, Gabon and Togo are expected to make their debuts.
