= Donald Rukare =

Ugandan lawyer

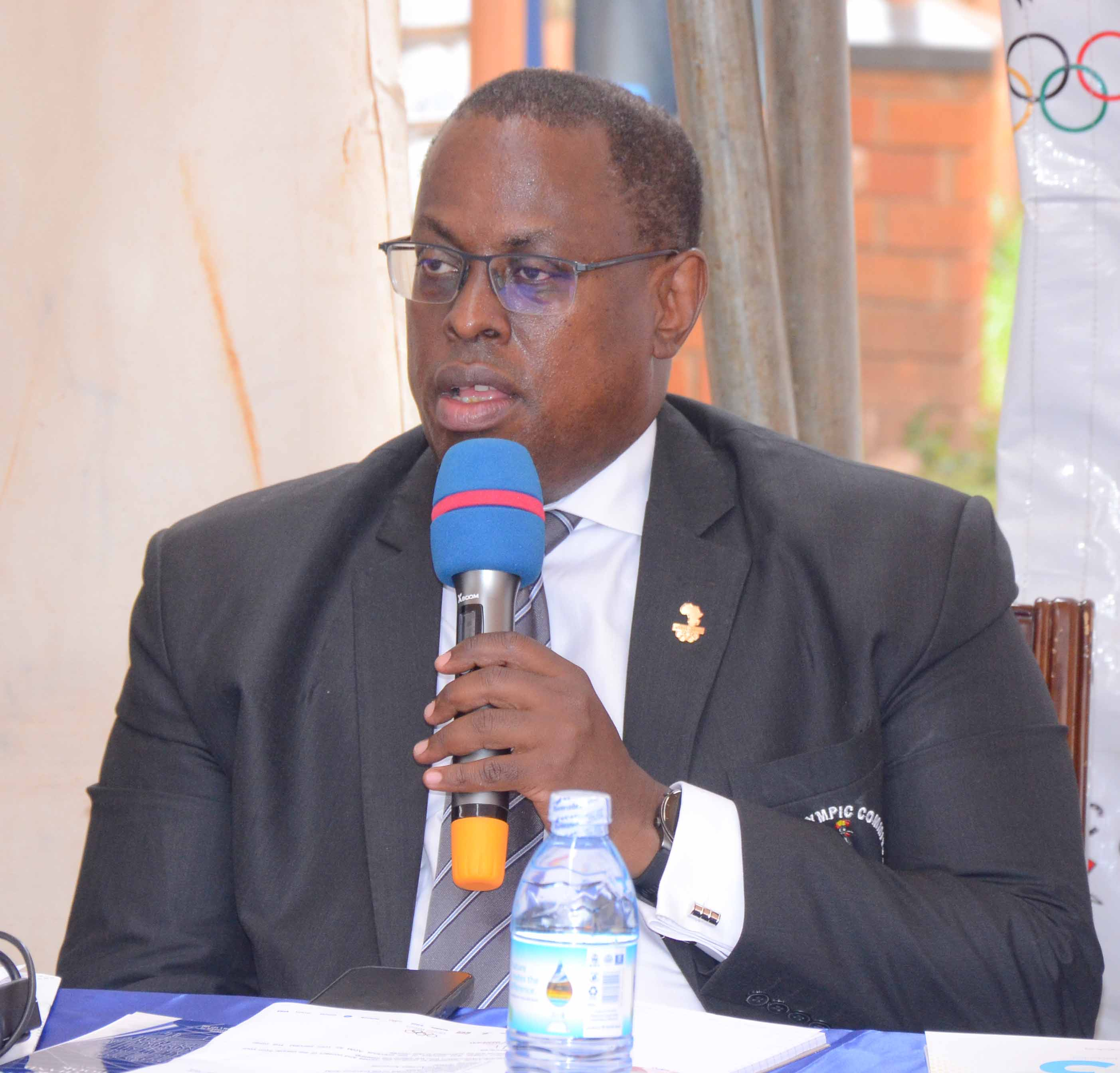

Chairman of the National Council of Sports of Uganda
- Incumbent
- Assumed office 16 February 2020
- Preceded by: John Bosco Onyik

10th President of Commonwealth Sport
- Incumbent
- Assumed office 26 November 2025
- Preceded by: Christopher Jenkins

Personal details
- Born: 4 November 1968 (age 57) Mulago, Kampala, Uganda
- Spouse: Jacqueline Namara
- Children: David Rukare
- Education: Makerere University (Bachelor in Law); Lund University (Master in Law); University of Pretoria (Doctor in Law); University of Louvain (Master in Sports)
- Occupation: Lawyer, lecturer
- Known for: Sports administration, leadership, academic administration

Donald Rukare (born 4 November 1968) is a Ugandan lawyer and lecturer. He currently serves as the Chairperson of National Council of Sports of Uganda since 16 February 2020, as well as the President of Uganda Olympic Committee. He serves as an advocate of the High Court of Uganda and of recent served as the President of the Uganda Swimming Federation. He is currently the Chief of Party of the USAID Rights and Rule of Project in Uganda. On November 26, 2025, he was elected President of Commonwealth Sport.

== Early life and education ==
Rukare graduated with a Doctor of Law (LLD) from the University of Pretoria in South Africa, has a Masters of Law (LLM) from Lund University Sweden, has post-graduate diplomas in international law, development and legal practice, a Bachelor of Laws from Makerere University as well as a master's degree in Sports Law from ISDE Law and Business School in Madrid. Donald also holds an Executive Masters in Sports Management from the University of Louvain, Belgium, and has taken leadership and strategic management courses at the Harvard Kennedy School of Government and Harvard Business School in the US, as well as an international sports law program at Cambridge University in the UK.

== Career ==
=== Corporate ===
Rukare has served in various positions such as a Head of Program Manager of European Union Human Right, as a Legal Advisor to Embassy of Ireland. He serves as an advocate of the High Court of Uganda, as a part-time lecturer in Sports Law at the Uganda Christian University in Mukono and is a regular guest faculty at the International Law Institute Kampala and the Center for Human Rights Pretoria University in South Africa. He is an external examiner at both Makerere University and Pretoria University. Rukare is a MEMOS lecturer of Governance teaching Sports Governance and Management on the International Olympic Committee Executive Masters Program (MEMOS). He also teaches International Sports Law at ISDE Law and Business School. He is currently the Chief of Party of the USAID Rights and Rule of Law Project in Uganda.

=== Sports ===
Rukare has been a semi-pro swimmer for 10 years and represented Uganda in swimming competitions. In 2005, he was elected as the president for the Uganda Swimming Federation, replacing Jerry Dralga. On 16 February 2020, Rukare was appointed by Minister of Sports to serve as the chairperson for the National Council of Sports of Uganda

In February 2021, Rukare was elected as the President of Uganda Olympic Committee replacing William Blick.

In April 2025, he was appointed as interim president of the Commonwealth Games Federation following the resignation of Welshman Chris Jenkins until the election of a new president during the Commonwealth Games General Assembly in November.

== Committee memberships ==
Rukare is a former national swimmer and currently holds a number of sports positions including Chairperson of the National Council of Sports, former President of the Uganda Swimming Federation, Vice President of the African Swimming Federation (CANA), International Swimming Federation (FINA) Bureau member representing Africa, former board chair of Special Olympics Uganda, the Secretary General of the Uganda Olympic Committee. He is also an arbitrator of the International Court of Arbitration for Sport (CAS), a panel member of the results management panel of the Regional Anti-Doping Agency (RADO), a member of the Commonwealth Games Federation Ethics Commission and is a MEMOS Professor, teaching Governance and Sports Management on the IOC MEMOS Master's program in addition to an International Olympic Committee (IOC) consultant/advisor that has undertaken assignments for the IOC in Ghana, Kenya, Nigeria and Lesotho. Rukare is also a board member of World Voices a local Non-Government Organisation in Uganda that works in the Justice and human rights space.

== Other considerations ==
Rukare has served as a consultant to the World Bank, African Union, Ireland Aid, Danida, and the International Law Institute. He has written and published several articles on among others human rights, governance and personal branding that have featured in the print media in Uganda and has been invited to speak and present papers on governance, human rights and personal branding by various institutions across the world.
