= Nassau Stadium =

Beach soccer stadium in Nassau

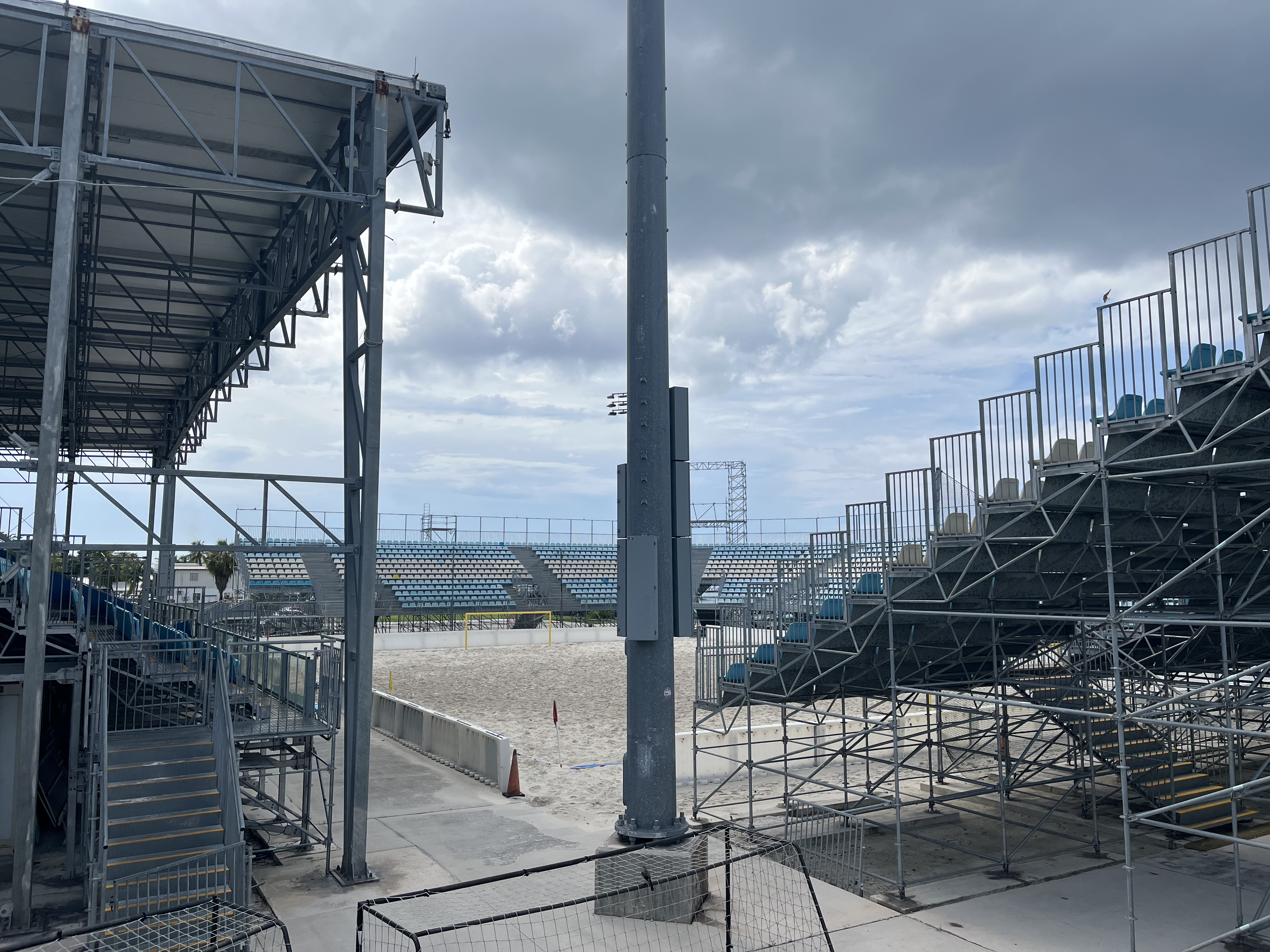
- Interactive map of Nassau Stadium
- Full name: National Beach Soccer Arena
- Location: Nassau, Bahamas
- Coordinates: 25°04′32.9″N 77°19′31.2″W
- Capacity: 3,097
- Surface: Sand

Construction
- Built: 2017
- Cost: $2.5 million
- Architect: Bruce LaFleur
- Main contractor: Cavalier Construction

The Nassau Stadium, also known as the National Beach Soccer Arena and Malcolm Park Beach Soccer Facility, is a beach soccer stadium in Nassau, Bahamas. It was the venue of the 2017 FIFA Beach Soccer World Cup, 2017 CONCACAF Beach Soccer Championship and beach soccer events at the 2017 Commonwealth Youth Games.

== Construction ==
The site of the stadium, at Malcolm Park West, was the site of a former complex. The infrastructure of the former facility was demolished to make way for the Nassau Stadium. By November 11, 2016, site preparations for the construction of the stadium was already underway. The stadium's prefabricated structure was scheduled to arrive on November 17, 2016. After the structure's arrival, construction was scheduled to commenced. It was planned that the facility to be completed by the end of January 2017, in time for the Bahamas' hosting of the 2017 CONCACAF Beach Soccer Championship in February.

Construction of the facility began in early in January 2017, and by January 18 the stadium was already 75 percent complete.

The stadium was the result of a joint cooperation between the Bahamas government and FIFA. It was projected that the stadium's construction will cost at least $2.5 million. The architect of the stadium is Bruce LaFleur while the construction of the stadium is being managed by Cavalier Construction.

== Facility ==
The Nassau Stadium has a capacity of 3,097. The sporting facility's grand stand host VIP boxes. A VIP area is situated on the second floor of the facility. The seats of the stadium are in aquamarine and yellow, which are colors of the Bahamas flag.

The stadium also houses offices, locker rooms, media workstations, medical offices, support system and storage facilities, doping room and a competition control area. The surface of the stadium's field is sand, suitable for beach soccer and beach volleyball.

Preceded by Espinho Stadium; Espinho, Portugal	FIFA Beach Soccer; World Cup venue 2017	Succeeded by Los Pynandi Stadium; Luque, Paraguay
