= Raimoana Bennett =

Tahitian footballer (born 1981)

Personal information
- Full name: Raimoana Stephen Patrick Bennett
- Date of birth: 15 February 1981 (age 45)
- Place of birth: Pueu, Tahiti
- Height: 1.73 m (5 ft 8 in)
- Position: Forward

Senior career*
Years	Team	Apps	(Gls)
2001–2007	AS Pirae		
2007–2010	AS Dragon		
2010–2011	A.S. Central Sport		
2011–2015	AS Pirae		

International career^{‡}
2002–2007	Tahiti	11	(0)
Medal record
Men's football
Representing Tahiti
OFC Nations Cup
Third place	2002 New Zealand
Men's Beach soccer
Representing Tahiti
FIFA Beach Soccer World Cup
Runner-up	2015 Portugal
Runner-up	2017 Bahamas
- * Club domestic league appearances and goals as of 13 June 2018 ‡ National team caps and goals as of 13 June 2018

Raimoana Stephen Patrick Bennett (born 15 March 1981) is a footballer who plays as a forward. He previously played for AS Pirae. He currently plays for AS Dragon in the Tahiti Division Fédérale and the Tahiti national football team.

== Honours ==
Tahiti

- OFC Nations Cup: 3rd place, 2002
- FIFA Beach Soccer World Cup: Runner-up, 2015, 2017
