= William Frederick Blick =

Ugandan engineer and IOC member

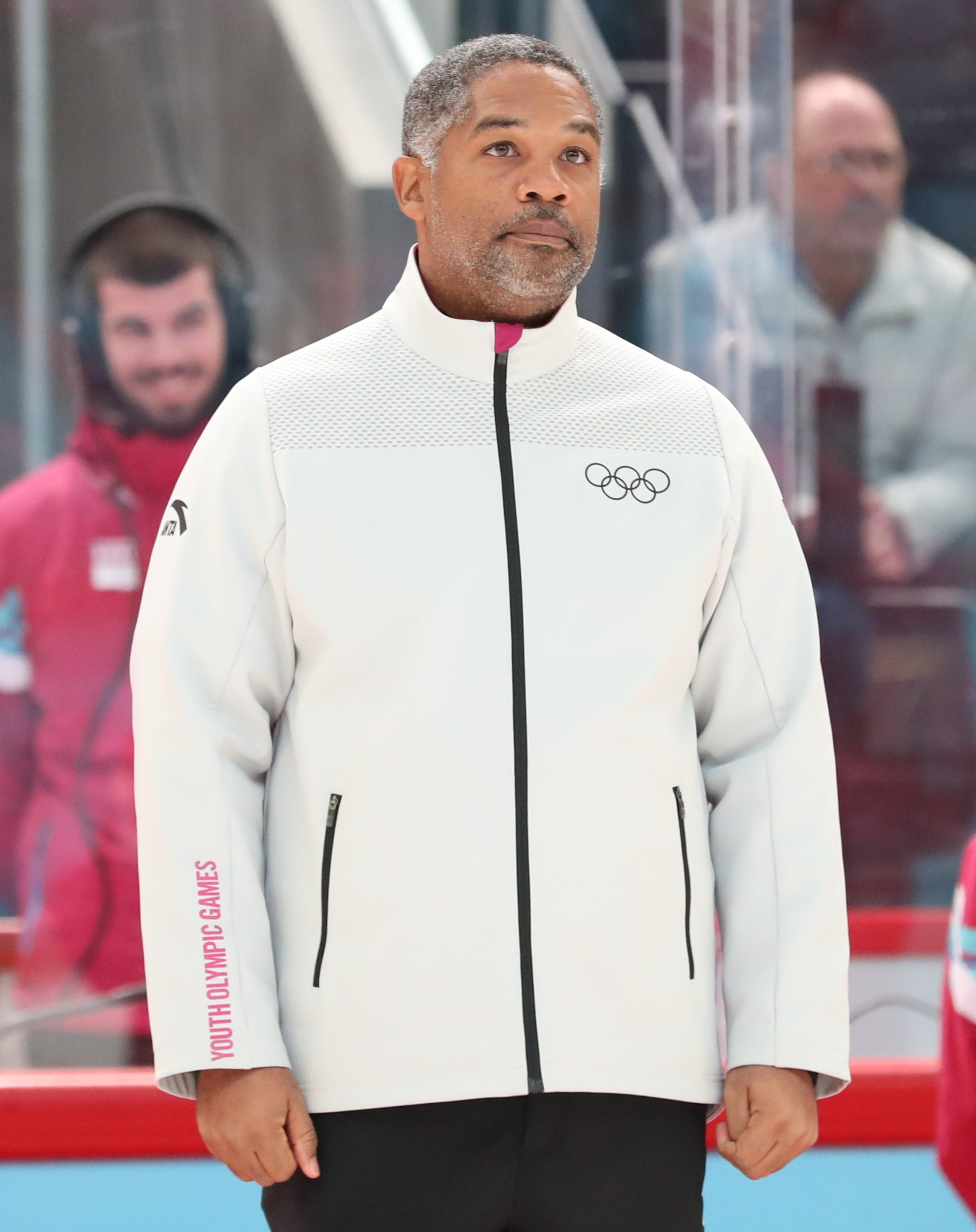
William Blick at the 2020 Winter Youth Olympics.

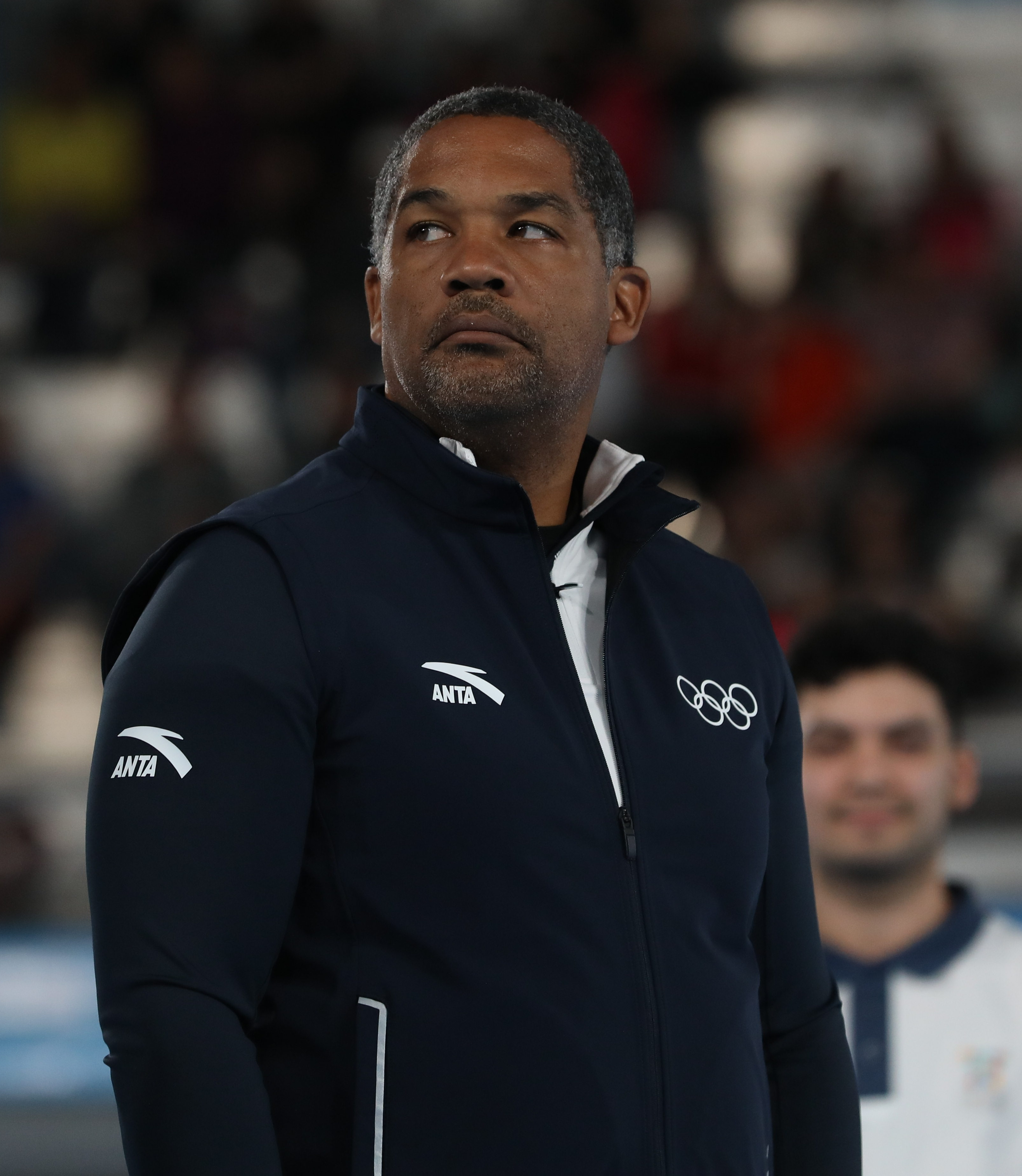
William Blick at the 2018 Summer Youth Olympics.

William Frederick Blick (born 17 October 1974) is a Ugandan engineer who has served as a member of the International Olympic Committee (IOC) since 2018.

== Education ==
Blick attended the Greenwich School of Business Management Center in Great Britain in 1994 and received a Bachelor of Science in Business Management from the University of Hull in 1998. He also holds an Executive Masters in Sports Organization Management from the Université Catholique de Louvain in Belgium, which he received in 2014.

== Career ==
Blick has been the Director of Speedway Quickfix Engineering since 2005. In 2013, he became board advisor of Gems Cambridge International School Uganda. He has been a lecturer and motivational speaker since 2017, as well as a sports consultant. Blick became a farmer in forestry and agricultural produce in 2018, and in 2019 he has worked in Real Estate (Housing).

== Sports career ==
From 2006 to 2013, Blick was the Chairman of the Uganda Rugby Union. From 2010 to 2014, he was executive board member of the Confederation of African Rugby. Since 2012, Blick has been President of the Uganda Olympic Committee and Commonwealth Games Association. In 2016, he became part of the Commonwealth Games Federation Executive board. Since 2017, Blick has been President of the Association of National Olympic Committees of Africa (ANOCA) Zone 5, Executive board member of the ANOCA, as well as, Vice-chair of the ANOCA Games Coordination Commission.

== Awards ==
Blick was named National Rugby Player of the Year 1992 by the Uganda Sports Press Association. In 2006, he was National Clubman Rally Champion, and in 2019 he received the Order of the Star of Italy. In 2020, Blick received the Award of Merit from the ANOCA.
