= Beach volleyball at the 2017 Commonwealth Youth Games =

- Venue: Queen Elizabeth Sporting Complex
- Dates: July 18, 2017–July 22, 2017

Beach volleyball at the 2017 Commonwealth Youth Games was held in Nassau, Bahamas from 18 to 21 July 2017 at Roscoe A. L. Davis Soccer Field, Queen Elizabeth Sporting Complex.

== Medalists ==
| Event | Gold | Silver | Bronze |
|---|---|---|---|
| Boys | England; Javier Bello; Joaquin Bello | Cyprus; Sotiris Siapanis; Constantinos Skordis | Australia; Mark William Nicolaidis; James Blake Takken |
| Girls | Australia; Rebecca May Ingram; Carrie Van Rensburg | New Zealand; Ella Margaret Akkerman; Jasmine Tiaho Pepi-milton | Rwanda; Valentine Munezero; Penelope Musabyimana |

== Medal table ==
| Rank | Nation | Gold | Silver | Bronze | Total |
|---|---|---|---|---|---|
| 1 | Australia | 1 | 0 | 1 | 2 |
| 2 | England | 1 | 0 | 0 | 1 |
| 3 | Cyprus | 0 | 1 | 0 | 1 |
| 3 | New Zealand | 0 | 1 | 0 | 1 |
| 5 | Rwanda | 0 | 0 | 1 | 1 |
| Totals (5 entries) | | 2 | 2 | 2 | 6 |

== Results ==
=== Boys ===
==== Preliminary ====
===== Pool A =====
| Pos | Team | Pld | W | L | Pts | SW | SL | SR | SPW | SPL | SPR |
|---|---|---|---|---|---|---|---|---|---|---|---|
| 1 | Sotiris Siapanis – Constantinos Skordis (CYP) | 2 | 2 | 0 | 4 | 4 | 0 | MAX | 84 | 49 | 1.714 |
| 2 | Lukholo Jooste – Aviwe Bulela Mamfanya (RSA) | 2 | 1 | 1 | 3 | 2 | 2 | 1.000 | 69 | 69 | 1.000 |
| 3 | Nathan Wert – Kyle Wilson (BAH) | 2 | 0 | 2 | 2 | 0 | 4 | 0.000 | 49 | 84 | 0.583 |

| Date | | Score | | Set 1 | Set 2 | Set 3 |
|---|---|---|---|---|---|---|
| 18 July | Jooste–Mamfanya (RSA) | 0–2 | Siapanis–Skordis (CYP) | 13–21 | 14–21 | |
| 18 July | Wert–Wilson (BAH) | 0–2 | Siapanis–Skordis (CYP) | 9–21 | 13–21 | |
| 19 July | Wert–Wilson (BAH) | 0–2 | Jooste–Mamfanya (RSA) | 18–21 | 9–21 | |

===== Pool B =====
| Pos | Team | Pld | W | L | Pts | SW | SL | SR | SPW | SPL | SPR |
|---|---|---|---|---|---|---|---|---|---|---|---|
| 1 | Mark William Nicolaidis – James Blake Takken (AUS) | 2 | 2 | 0 | 4 | 4 | 0 | MAX | 84 | 43 | 1.953 |
| 2 | Levi Leonce – Kyhim Remy (LCA) | 2 | 1 | 1 | 3 | 2 | 2 | 1.000 | 61 | 71 | 0.859 |
| 3 | James Cleare – Aaron Springer (BAH) | 2 | 0 | 2 | 2 | 0 | 4 | 0.000 | 44 | 84 | 0.524 |

| Date | | Score | | Set 1 | Set 2 | Set 3 |
|---|---|---|---|---|---|---|
| 18 July | Leonce–Remy (LCA) | 0–2 | Nicolaidis–Takken (AUS) | 7–21 | 12–21 | |
| 19 July | Nicolaidis–Takken (AUS) | 2–0 | Cleare–Springer (BAH) | 21–9 | 21–6 | |
| 19 July | Leonce–Remy (LCA) | 2–0 | Cleare–Springer (BAH) | 21–10 | 21–19 | |
