= Cycling at the 2017 Commonwealth Youth Games =

- Venue: New Providence
- Location: Bahamas
- Dates: 19–23 July 2017
- Competitors: 52 from 25 nations

Cycling at the 2017 Commonwealth Youth Games is held on streets of New Providence, Bahamas. Time trial took place on 19 July while road race took place on 23 July 2017.

== Results ==
=== Men's ===
Event	Gold		Silver		Bronze	
Time Trial	Matthew Oliveira; Bermuda	12:06	Dylan Hughes; Scotland	12:18	Sebastian Berwick; Australia	12:21
Road Race	Thomas Bostock; Isle of Man	1:32:28	Samuel Culverwell; Guernsey	1:32:29	Matthew Oliveira; Bermuda	s.t.

=== Women's ===
Event	Gold		Silver		Bronze	
Time Trial	Madeleine Fasnacht; Australia	13:12	Abigail Morton; New Zealand	13:45	Alyssa Rowse; Bermuda	13:47
Road Race	Rhona Callander; Scotland	1:57:15	Tara Ferguson; Isle of Man	s.t.	Madeleine Fasnacht; Australia	s.t.
