= Judo at the 2017 Commonwealth Youth Games =

Judo competition

- Venue: Kendal G.L. Isaacs Gymnasium
- Location: Nassau, Bahamas
- Dates: 18–23 July 2017
- Competitors: 51 from 17 nations

Judo at the 2017 Commonwealth Youth Games was held at the Thomas Robinson Stadium in Nassau, Bahamas on 18 July 2017.

== Medalists ==
=== Male ===
Event	Gold	Silver	Bronze
Extra lightweight (−60 kg)	Simon Zulu; Zambia	Georgios Balarjishvili; Cyprus	Ashish; India
Extra lightweight (−60 kg)	Simon Zulu; Zambia	Georgios Balarjishvili; Cyprus	Mosa Thetsane; South Africa
Lightweight (−73 kg)	Soni; India	Uros Nikolic; Australia	Matthew Elliott; Northern Ireland
Lightweight (−73 kg)	Soni; India	Uros Nikolic; Australia	Lachlan James Moorhead; England
Middleweight (−90 kg)	Thomas Matthew Lish; England	Connor Anthony Smith; Australia	Louis Thomas Ge Saez; Scotland
Heavyweight (+90 kg)	Timothy Mark Hollingbery; Australia	Helder Martins; Mozambique	Daleon Sweeting; Bahamas

=== Female ===
Event	Gold	Silver	Bronze
Extra lightweight (−48 kg)	Sian Bobrowska; England	Fiona Ulaan Todman; Scotland	Antim Yadav; India
Extra lightweight (−48 kg)	Sian Bobrowska; England	Fiona Ulaan Todman; Scotland	Sofia Asvesta; Cyprus
Lightweight (−57 kg)	Leah Kaye Grosvenor; England	Emma Catherine Forrest; Scotland	Rebina Devi Chanam; India
Lightweight (−57 kg)	Leah Kaye Grosvenor; England	Emma Catherine Forrest; Scotland	Mya Beneby; Bahamas
Middleweight (−70 kg)	Holly Olivia Bentham; England	Francis Lavinia Newman; Australia	
Heavyweight (+70 kg)	Emily Elizabeth Ritchie; Scotland	Aoife Kristie Mccallion; Northern Ireland	Karra Hanna; Bahamas

== Medal table ==
* Host nation (Bahamas)

Rank	Nation	Gold	Silver	Bronze	Total
1	England	4	0	1	5
2	Australia	1	3	0	4
3	Scotland	1	2	1	4
4	India	1	0	3	4
5	Zambia	1	0	0	1
6	Cyprus	0	1	1	2
6	Northern Ireland	0	1	1	2
8	Mozambique	0	1	0	1
9	Bahamas*	0	0	3	3
10	South Africa	0	0	1	1
Totals (10 entries)		8	8	11	27

== Participating nations ==
A total of 51 athletes from 17 nations competed in judo at the 2017 Commonwealth Youth Games:

- Australia (7)
- Bahamas (8)
- Barbados (2)
- Cyprus (2)
- England (7)
- Guyana (1)
- India (4)
- Malawi (1)
- Mozambique (1)
- Northern Ireland (2)
- Samoa (1)
- Scotland (6)
- South Africa (1)
- Sri Lanka (2)
- Trinidad and Tobago (2)
- Wales (3)
- Zambia (1)
