= Boxing at the 2017 Commonwealth Youth Games =

Boxing at the VI Commonwealth Youth Games
- Host city: Bahamas
- Dates: July
- Main venue: Sir Kendal G. L. Isaacs Gymnasium, Nassau

Boxing competed as one of the eight sports at the 2017 Commonwealth Youth Games in the Bahamas from July 18 to 23, 2017, in the Sir Kendal G. L. Isaacs Gymnasium, Nassau. In the Games, the age limit for participating athletes has been set according to the youth category of the International Boxing Association, which is 16–18 years, means athletes born in 1999 or 2000 are only eligible to take part.

== Medal summary ==
=== Boys ===
Event	Gold	Silver	Bronze
Light flyweight	Sachin Siwach; India (IND)	James Nathan Probert; Wales (WAL)	Siyakholwa Kuse; South Africa (RSA)
Light flyweight	Sachin Siwach; India (IND)	James Nathan Probert; Wales (WAL)	John Morgan; England (ENG)
Flyweight	Eithan James; England (ENG)	Keevin Allicock; Guyana (GUY)	Taylor Hamilton; Scotland (SCO)
Flyweight	Eithan James; England (ENG)	Keevin Allicock; Guyana (GUY)	Jordon Mathieu; Canada (CAN)
Bantamweight	Shiloh Reuben M Defreitas; England (ENG)	Joshua John Wil Fitzpatrick; Australia (AUS)	Etash Khan Muhammed; India (IND)
Bantamweight	Shiloh Reuben M Defreitas; England (ENG)	Joshua John Wil Fitzpatrick; Australia (AUS)	Colm Murphy; England (ENG)
Lightweight	Charles Clem Frankham; England (ENG)	Jake Leroy Clague; Australia (AUS)	Rhys Tomas Edwards; Wales (WAL)
Lightweight	Charles Clem Frankham; England (ENG)	Jake Leroy Clague; Australia (AUS)	Tryagain Mornin Ndevelo; Namibia (NAM)
Light welterweight	Tyler Jai Jolly; Scotland (SCO)	Jacob Lovell; Wales (WAL)	Rufus Vesprey; Grenada (GRN)
Light welterweight	Tyler Jai Jolly; Scotland (SCO)	Jacob Lovell; Wales (WAL)	Hamza Khabbaz; Canada (CAN)
Welterweight	Mark Dickinson; England (ENG)	Anthony Johnston; Northern Ireland (NIR)	Samuel Charles Kickey; Scotland (SCO)
Welterweight	Mark Dickinson; England (ENG)	Anthony Johnston; Northern Ireland (NIR)	Jerone Ennis; Jamaica (JAM)
Middleweight	Aaron Patrick Bowen; England (ENG)	Kane Tucker; Northern Ireland (NIR)	Kyle Ting Chen; New Zealand (NZL)
Middleweight	Aaron Patrick Bowen; England (ENG)	Kane Tucker; Northern Ireland (NIR)	Satwinder Thind; Canada (CAN)
Light heavyweight	Sammy Alex Lee; Wales (WAL)	Lewis Beggs Johnstone; Scotland (SCO)	Lexson Mathieu; Canada (CAN)
Light heavyweight	Sammy Alex Lee; Wales (WAL)	Lewis Beggs Johnstone; Scotland (SCO)	Damien Vaughan; Samoa (SAM)

=== Girls ===
Event	Gold	Silver	Bronze
Flyweight	Chloe Louise Watson; England (ENG)	Shylah Te Urang Waikai; New Zealand (NZL)	Etka; India (IND)
Flyweight	Chloe Louise Watson; England (ENG)	Shylah Te Urang Waikai; New Zealand (NZL)	Megan Elizabeth Gordon; Scotland (SCO)
Lightweight	Ella Jade Boot; Australia (AUS)	Jony; India (IND)	Pelea Soara Fruean; New Zealand (NZL)
Lightweight	Ella Jade Boot; Australia (AUS)	Jony; India (IND)	Katiushka Vasquez Soto; Canada (CAN)
Middleweight	Georgia O'Connor; England (ENG)	Naomie Pelletier; Canada (CAN)	Artewekey Karen Fraser; Australia (AUS)

== Results ==
=== Boys - Light flyweight ===
Round of 16
James Nathan Probert (WAL)
Bye
Kavinda Sanjaya Samutun Mudiyansela (SRI)	5
Benjamin Joseph Cameron-Hands (AUS)	0
John Maron (NIR)
Bye
Bye
Seanoa Hall (SAM)
Tlholohelo Mokhesi (LES)
Bye
Bye
Siyakholwa Kuse (RSA)
Sachin (IND)
Bye
Ivan Hope Price (ENG)	5
John Thomas Casey (SCO)	0

Quarterfinal
James Nathan Probert (WAL)	4
Kavinda Sanjaya Samutun Mudiyansela (SRI)	1
John Maron (NIR)	5
Seanoa Hall (SAM)	0
Tlholohelo Mokhesi (LES)
Siyakholwa Kuse (RSA)	RSC
Sachin (IND)	4
Ivan Hope Price (ENG)	1

Semifinal
James Nathan Probert (WAL)	5
John Maron (NIR)	0
Siyakholwa Kuse (RSA)	0
Sachin (IND)	5

Gold medal
James Nathan Probert (WAL)	0
Sachin (IND)	4

=== Boys - Flyweight ===
Quarterfinal
Jordan Mathieu (CAN)
Bye
Kian Bittles (NIR)	1
Keevin Allicock (GUY)	4
Eithan James (ENG)	5
Jean David Giol Leveille (MRI)	0
Tully Burke Scanlon (AUS)	2
Taylor Hamilton (SCO)	3

Semifinal
Jordan Mathieu (CAN)	0
Keevin Allicock (GUY)	5
Eithan James (ENG)	5
Taylor Hamilton (SCO)	0

Gold medal
Keevin Allicock (GUY)	0
Eithan James (ENG)	5

=== Boys - Bantamweight ===
Round of 16
Etash Khan Muhammed (IND)
Bye
Phomolo Lengola (LES)	RSC
Alexander Smith (CAY)
Shiloh Reuben M Defreitas (ENG)	5
Justin Parris (TRI)	0
John Paul Wilson (WAL)	3
Tuihalangingie Vea (TGA)	2
Joshua John Wil Fitzpatrick (AUS)	4
Treasure Nature Moremi (BOT)	0
Jean Damien Gre Hellene (MRI)	4
Sylvinos Tangen Nampadhi (NAM)	1
Sean Finnigan (CAN)	3
Alfred Kotey (GHA)	2
Faraz Ahmed (SCO)	0
Colm Murphy (NIR)	5

Quarterfinal
Etash Khan Muhammed (IND)	5
Phomolo Lengola (LES)	0
Shiloh Reuben M Defreitas (NIR)	5
John Paul Wilson (WAL)	0
Joshua John Wil Fitzpatrick (AUS)	5
Jean Damien Gre Hellene (MRI)	0
Sean Finnigan (CAN)	0
Colm Murphy (NIR)	5

Semifinal
Etash Khan Muhammed (IND)	2
Shiloh Reuben M Defreitas (ENG)	3
Joshua John Wil Fitzpatrick (AUS)	3
Colm Murphy (NIR)	2

Gold medal
Shiloh Reuben M Defreitas (ENG)	5
Joshua John Wil Fitzpatrick (AUS)	0

=== Boys - Lightweight ===
Round of 16
Levi Freddy Joseph (DMA)
Bye
Kareem Boyce (LCA)
Tryagain Mornin Ndevelo (NAM)	RSC
Jake Leroy Clague (AUS)
Bye
Bye
Philip Quartey (GHA)
Thomas Chabot (CAN)
Bye
Dominic Bradley (NIR)	1
Rhys Thomas Edwards (WAL)	4
Dimitris Christofi (CYP)	0
Christopher Moore (GUY)	5
Bye
Charles Clem Frankham (ENG)

Quarterfinal
Levi Freddy Joseph (DMA)
Tryagain Mornin Ndevelo (NAM)	RSC
Jake Leroy Clague (AUS)	5
Philip Quartey (GHA)	0
Thomas Chabot (CAN)	2
Rhys Tomas Edwards (WAL)	3
Christopher Moore (GUY)	0
Charles Clem Frankham (ENG)	5

Semifinal
Tryagain Mornin Ndevelo (NAM)	1
Jake Leroy Clague (AUS)	4
Rhys Tomas Edwards (WAL)	0
Charles Clem Frankham (ENG)	5

Gold medal
Jake Leroy Clague (AUS)	0
Charles Clem Frankham (ENG)	5

=== Boys - Light welterweight ===
Round of 16
Jacob Lovell (WAL)
Bye
Mark Steven Borg Galelemogwe (AUS)	3
Benjamin James Vaughan (ENG)	2
Brian Tefo Galelemogwe (BOT)
Bye
Bye
Lenox Larenza Boyce Jr. (BAH)
Rodriquez Pauli Frederick (DMA)
Bye
Bye
Rufus Vesprey (GRN)
Rakai Tianara Kirkwood (NZL)	1
Hamza Khabbaz (CAN)	4
Bye
Tyler Jai Jolly (SCO)

Quarterfinal
Jacob Lovell (WAL)	4
Mark Steven Borg (AUS)	1
Brian Tefo Galelemogwe (BOT)	4
Lenox Larenza Boyce Jr. (BAH)	1
Rodriquez Pauli Frederick (DMA)
Rufus Vesprey (GRN)	RSC
Hamza Khabbaz (CAN)	0
Tyler Jai Jolly (SCO)	4

Semifinal
Jacob Lovell (WAL)	RSC
Brian Tefo Galelemogwe (BOT)
Rufus Vesprey (GRN)
Tyler Jai Jolly (SCO)	RSC

Gold medal
Jacob Lovell (WAL)	0
Tyler Jai Jolly (SCO)	5

=== Boys - Welterweight ===
Round of 16
Benjamin Hussain (AUS)
Bye
Jayden Te Waiho Down (NZL)	1
Mark Dickinson (ENG)	4
Samuel Charles Hickey (SCO)
Bye
Bye
Hunter Lee (CAN)
Jerone Ennis (JAM)
Bye
Bye
Uket Obono (NGR)
Marion Ah Tong (SAM)
Bye
Bye
Anthony Johnston (NIR)

Quarterfinal
Benjamin Hussain (AUS)	1
Mark Dickinson (ENG)	4
Samuel Charles Hickey (SCO)	3
Hunter Lee (CAN)	0
Jerone Ennis (JAM)	WO
Uket Obono (NGR)
Marion Ah Tong (SAM)	0
Anthony Johnston (NIR)	5

Semifinal
Mark Dickinson (ENG)	4
Samuel Charles Hickey (SCO)	1
Jerone Ennis (JAM)
Anthony Johnston (NIR)	RSC

Gold medal
Mark Dickinson (ENG)	4
Anthony Johnston (NIR)	1

=== Boys - Middleweight ===
Round of 16
Jay Daniel Munn (WAL)
Bye
Kyle Ting Chen (NZL)	3
Callum James Adams (AUS)	2
Aaron Patrick Bowen (ENG)
Bye
Bye
Nickelle Joseph (TRI)
Ryan Reekie (SCO)
Bye
Bye
Kane Tucker (NIR)
Curlun Richardson (AIA)
Bye
Bye
Satwinder Thind (CAN)

Quarterfinal
Jay Daniel Munn (WAL)	0
Kyle Ting Chen (NZL)	5
Aaron Patrick Bowen (ENG)	5
Nickelle Joseph (TRI)	0
Ryan Reekie (SCO)	1
Kane Tucker (NIR)	4
Curlun Richardson (AIA)	0
Satwinder Thind (CAN)	RSC

Semifinal
Kyle Ting Chen (NZL)	1
Aaron Patrick Bowen (ENG)	4
Kane Tucker (NIR)	5
Satwinder Thind (CAN)	0

Gold medal
Aaron Patrick Bowen (ENG)	4
Kane Tucker (NIR)	1

=== Boys - Light heavyweight ===
Quarterfinal
Lexson Mathieu (CAN)
Bye
Sammy Alex Lee (WAL)	RSC
Anthony Michael Molinaro (AUS)
Damien Vaughan (SAM)	5
Tyron Thomas (TRI)	0
Lewis Beggs Johnstone (SCO)	5
Timon Gilbert (GRN)	0

Semifinal
Lexson Mathieu (CAN)	0
Sammy Alex Lee (WAL)	5
Damien Vaughan (SAM)	0
Lewis Beggs Johnstone (SCO)	5

Gold medal
Sammy Alex Lee (WAL)	5
Lewis Beggs Johnstone (SCO)	0

=== Girls - Flyweight ===
Round of 16
Helena Ismael Bagao (MOZ)
Bye
Madumali Eranga Marappuli Henayale (SRI)	1
Shylah Te Urang Waikai (NZL)	4
Chambria Dalhouse (CAY)
Bye
Bye
Megan Elizabeth Gordon (SCO)
Indianna Joy Heibloem (AUS)
Bye
Bye
Chloe Louise Watson (ENG)
Christian Zelenco (CAN)
Bye
Bye
Ekta (IND)

Quarterfinal
Helena Ismael Bagao (MOZ)	0
Shylah Te Urang Waikai (NZL)	5
Chambria Dalhouse (CAY)	0
Megan Elizabeth Gordon (SCO)	5
Indianna Joy Heibloem (AUS)	0
Chloe Louise Watson (ENG)	5
Christian Zelenco (CAN)	2
Ekta (IND)	3

Semifinal
Shylah Te Urang Waikai (NZL)	5
Megan Elizabeth Gordon (SCO)	0
Chloe Louise Watson (ENG)	4
Ekta (IND)	1

Gold medal
Shylah Te Urang Waikai (NZL)	0
Chloe Louise Watson (ENG)	5

=== Girls - Lightweight ===
Quarterfinal
Ella Jade Boot (AUS)
Bye
Pelea Soara Fruean (NZL)	5
Sadie Thomas (ENG)	0
Amorie Gonsalves (RSA)	0
Katiushka Vasquez Soto (CAN)	5
Bye
Jony (IND)

Semifinal
Ella Jade Boot (AUS)	3
Pelea Soara Fruean (NZL)	2
Katiushka Vasquez Soto (CAN)	0
Jony (IND)	5

Gold medal
Ella Jade Boot (AUS)	3
Jony (IND)	2

=== Girls - Middleweight ===
Semifinal		Gold medal
Artewekey Karen Fraser (AUS)
Naomie Pelletier (CAN)	RSC	Naomie Pelletier (CAN)
Itunu Oriola (NGR)		Georgia Ann O'Connor (ENG)	RSC
Georgia Ann O'Connor (ENG)	WO
