= Chatter ring =

New Zealand toy

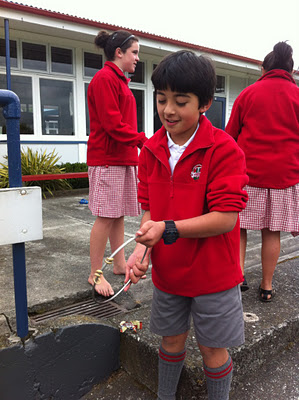
- A boy playing with a ring
- Other names: Gyro Ring, Jitter ring
- Country: New Zealand
- Availability: 1990s–present
- Materials: metal ring, beads

A chatter ring (also known as a gyro ring or jitter ring) is a New Zealand toy ring of thick metal wire running through several smaller metal rings. The toy is used by swiping the smaller rings to get them spinning and vibrating, while keeping the ring turning. Around fifty thousand rings were purchased in New Zealand at department stores, street markets and dairies in 1996, and was a popular Christmas gift for children that year. During this time, there were several mentions of chatter rings on both radio and television.

== 2011 revival ==
The toys were originally popular in the 1990s, and had a revival in 2011 when Apple Activities Educational Toys hosted the Hawke's Bay Chatter Ring Reunion in Hastings. Prizes were awarded in a lucky dip as well as for winners of a number of categories such as best performance, oldest verifiable ring, youngest player and oldest player.

Toshiaki Sasaki, recognised as the world's number one chatter ring player, visited New Zealand for a twelve-day tour to support and promote the re-release of the rings. The chatter ring has been played with by the former Mayor of Invercargill Tim Shadbolt.

A new generation of chatter rings was launched by Murray Potts who described the unveiling of his newly developed and produced jitter rings as a case of "what goes around comes around". Potts had previously made them commercially, working out of Japan. He later worked with a toy maker in Taiwan to produce the new jitter rings and along with Hawaii, both New Zealand and Taiwan became the first locations to experience the toy.

Chatter ring performances were included on an episode of New Zealand children's television series What Now and at department store Farmers.
