= Rugby sevens at the 2017 Commonwealth Youth Games =

- Host nation: Bahamas

The Rugby sevens competition at the 2017 Commonwealth Youth Games in Nassau, Bahamas was held in July 2017 at Queen Elizabeth Sporting Complex.

A total of 10 nations competed in this tournament. There were 6 teams in the boys event and 6 teams in the girls event. Each team played the other once in the group stage. The 5th and 6th placed teams played the 5th place playoff, the 3rd and 4th played the bronze-medal match and the 1st and 2nd placed teams played the gold-medal match. The girls competition was won by Australia, while the boys competition was won by Samoa.

== Boys ==
=== Group stage ===
Team	Pld	W	D	L	PF	PA	PD	Pts
England	5	4	0	1	163	53	+110	13
Samoa	5	4	0	1	161	46	+115	13
Fiji	5	3	0	2	126	68	+58	11
Canada	5	3	0	2	97	93	+4	11
Sri Lanka	5	1	0	4	117	101	+16	5
Bahamas	5	0	0	5	5	308	-303	3

July 19, 2017
9:00

Fiji	59–0	Bahamas
	Report

Queen Elizabeth Sporting Complex, Nassau

July 19, 2017
9:22

England	7–19	Samoa
	Report

Queen Elizabeth Sporting Complex, Nassau

July 19, 2017
9:44

Canada	19–15	Sri Lanka
	Report

Queen Elizabeth Sporting Complex, Nassau

July 19, 2017
13:00

Fiji	14–7	Sri Lanka
	Report

Queen Elizabeth Sporting Complex, Nassau

July 19, 2017
13:22

England	26–10	Canada
	Report

Queen Elizabeth Sporting Complex, Nassau

July 19, 2017
13:44

Samoa	59–5	Bahamas
	Report

Queen Elizabeth Sporting Complex, Nassau

July 19, 2017
16:00

Fiji	19–21	Canada
	Report

Queen Elizabeth Sporting Complex, Nassau

July 19, 2017
16:22

England	72–0	Bahamas
	Report

Queen Elizabeth Sporting Complex, Nassau

July 19, 2017
16:44

Samoa	36–14	Sri Lanka
	Report

Queen Elizabeth Sporting Complex, Nassau

July 20, 2017
9:00

Samoa	15–14	Bahamas
	Report

Queen Elizabeth Sporting Complex, Nassau

July 20, 2017
9:22

England	32–5	Sri Lanka
	Report

Queen Elizabeth Sporting Complex, Nassau

July 20, 2017
9:44

Canada	42–0	Bahamas
	Report

Queen Elizabeth Sporting Complex, Nassau

July 20, 2017
12:30

Sri Lanka	76–0	Bahamas
	Report

Queen Elizabeth Sporting Complex, Nassau

July 20, 2017
12:52

Canada	5–33	Samoa
	Report

Queen Elizabeth Sporting Complex, Nassau

July 20, 2017
13:14

Fiji	19–26	England
	Report

Queen Elizabeth Sporting Complex, Nassau

=== Final stages ===
==== 5th Place Playoff ====
July 21, 2017
9:30

Sri Lanka	43–5	Bahamas
	Report

Queen Elizabeth Sporting Complex, Nassau

==== Bronze-medal match ====
July 21, 2017
10:30

Fiji	28–14	Canada
	Report

Queen Elizabeth Sporting Complex, Nassau

==== Gold-medal match ====
July 21, 2017
11:00

England	5–10	Samoa
	Report

Queen Elizabeth Sporting Complex, Nassau

== Girls ==
=== Group stage ===
Team	Pld	W	D	L	PF	PA	PD	Pts
Australia	5	5	0	0	213	22	+191	15
Canada	5	4	0	1	185	41	+144	13
Wales	5	3	0	2	147	66	+81	11
Fiji	5	3	0	2	98	112	-14	9
Trinidad and Tobago	5	1	0	4	20	175	-155	7
Bermuda	5	0	0	5	5	252	-247	5

July 19, 2017
10:06

Australia	60–0	Bermuda
	Report

Queen Elizabeth Sporting Complex, Nassau

July 19, 2017
10:28

Canada	33–10	Wales
	Report

Queen Elizabeth Sporting Complex, Nassau

July 19, 2017
10:50

Fiji	29–0	Trinidad and Tobago
	Report

Queen Elizabeth Sporting Complex, Nassau

July 19, 2017
14:06

Australia	62–0	Trinidad and Tobago
	Report

Queen Elizabeth Sporting Complex, Nassau

July 19, 2017
14:28

Canada	40–7	Fiji
	Report

Queen Elizabeth Sporting Complex, Nassau

July 19, 2017
14:50

Wales	58–0	Bermuda
	Report

Queen Elizabeth Sporting Complex, Nassau

July 19, 2017
17:06

Australia	41–5	Fiji
	Report

Queen Elizabeth Sporting Complex, Nassau

July 19, 2017
17:28

Canada	64–0	Bermuda
	Report

Queen Elizabeth Sporting Complex, Nassau

July 19, 2017
17:50

Wales	53–0	Trinidad and Tobago
	Report

Queen Elizabeth Sporting Complex, Nassau

July 20, 2017
10:06

Bermuda	5–50	Fiji
	Report

Queen Elizabeth Sporting Complex, Nassau

July 20, 2017
10:28

Trinidad and Tobago	0–31	Canada
	Report

Queen Elizabeth Sporting Complex, Nassau

July 20, 2017
10:50

Wales	0–26	Australia
	Report

Queen Elizabeth Sporting Complex, Nassau

July 20, 2017
13:36

Bermuda	0–20	Trinidad and Tobago
	Report

Queen Elizabeth Sporting Complex, Nassau

July 20, 2017
13:58

Wales	26–7	Fiji
	Report

Queen Elizabeth Sporting Complex, Nassau

July 20, 2017
14:20

Australia	24–17	Canada
	Report

Queen Elizabeth Sporting Complex, Nassau

=== Final stages ===
==== 5th Place Playoff ====
July 21, 2017
9:00

Trinidad and Tobago	29–0	Bermuda
	Report

Queen Elizabeth Sporting Complex, Nassau

==== Bronze-medal match ====
July 21, 2017
10:00

Wales	19–14	Fiji
	Report

Queen Elizabeth Sporting Complex, Nassau

==== Gold-medal match ====
July 21, 2017
11:30

Australia	31–5	Canada
	Report

Queen Elizabeth Sporting Complex, Nassau

== Medal table ==
Rank	Nation	Gold	Silver	Bronze	Total
1	Australia	1	0	0	1
1	Samoa	1	0	0	1
3	Canada	0	1	0	1
3	England	0	1	0	1
5	Fiji	0	0	1	1
5	Wales	0	0	1	1
Totals (6 entries)		2	2	2	6
