= 2000 Commonwealth Youth Games =

I Commonwealth Youth Games
- Host city: Edinburgh, Scotland
- Nations: 15
- Athletes: 733
- Events: 109 in 8 sports
- Opening: 10 August 2000
- Closing: 14 August 2000
- Opened by: Prince Edward, Earl of Wessex
- Main venue: Meadowbank Stadium

The 2000 Commonwealth Youth Games, officially known as the I Commonwealth Youth Games and commonly known as Edinburgh 2000, were a regional sporting event that was held from 10 to 14 August 2000 in the Scottish capital of Edinburgh.

== Participating nations ==
733 Athletes from 15 nations took place in the games. All competitors are aged 18 or under (their 18th birthday during the calendar year the games are held).

Australia
Barbados
Canada
England
India
Isle of Man
Jersey
Malaysia
Nauru
New Zealand
Northern Ireland
South Africa
Scotland (host)
Wales
Zimbabwe (Only one appearance prior to Zimbabwe’s withdrawal from the Commonwealth of Nations in 2003)

== Sports ==
The following sports were included in the 2000 games:

- Athletics ()
- Fencing ()
- Gymnastics ()
- Field hockey ()
- Squash ()
- Swimming ()
- Tennis ()
- Weightlifting ()

== Medal count ==
This is the full table of the medal count of these Games. These rankings sort by the number of gold medals earned by a country. The number of silvers is taken into consideration next and then the number of bronze. If, after the above, countries are still tied, equal ranking is given and they are listed alphabetically. This follows the system used by the IOC, IAAF and BBC. All results obtained from official returned results.

* Host nation (Scotland)

Rank	Nation	Gold	Silver	Bronze	Total
1	England (ENG)	35	38	20	93
2	Australia (AUS)	34	26	26	86
3	Nauru (NRU)	17	2	0	19
4	South Africa (SAF)	13	26	26	65
5	New Zealand (NZL)	6	0	0	6
6	Scotland (SCO)*	3	7	23	33
7	Malaysia (MAS)	1	2	4	7
8	Canada (CAN)	1	2	1	4
9	Wales (WAL)	0	5	3	8
10	Northern Ireland (NIR)	0	1	0	1
11	India (IND)	0	0	1	1
Totals (11 entries)		110	109	104	323

England finished the games ahead of Australia with medals picked up across multiple sports and events. Australia dominated in the aquatics picking up 25 gold medals in the pool. Island nation Nauru finished an impressive third with all 19 of their medals (including 17 golds) arriving in the weightlifting.
