= 2017 Commonwealth Youth Games =

Athletics championship in the Bahamas

VI Commonwealth Youth Games
- Host city: Nassau, The Bahamas
- Nations: 64
- Athletes: 1034
- Events: 96
- Opening: 18 July 2017
- Closing: 23 July 2017
- Opened by: Prime Minister Hubert Minnis
- Queen's Baton Final Runner: Tanya Robinson
- Main venue: Thomas Robinson Stadium
- Website: http://www.bahamas2017cyg.org/

The 2017 Commonwealth Youth Games, officially known as the VI Commonwealth Youth Games, and commonly known as Bahamas 2017, or Nassau 2017, was the sixth edition of the Commonwealth Youth Games which started in 2000. The games were held from 19 to 23 July 2017 in Nassau, Bahamas. 64 nations participated at the games. The Bahamas 2017 was the largest international sporting event ever to be hosted in The Bahamas, and the largest-ever edition of the Youth Games, with up to 1300 athletes. During the opening ceremony the Prime Minister of the Bahamas Hubert Minnis declared the games officially open. It was the first the time that the tournament was opened by a prime minister instead of a monarch or a president.

== Host selection ==
They were planned to be held in Castries, the capital of Saint Lucia, but Saint Lucia withdrew in 2015, citing financial difficulties. Canada and Scotland both offered to host the games if no other nation was willing to bid.

In 2016, Nassau, Bahamas, was selected to host the 2017 edition.

== The Games ==
It was the second edition of the Youth Games to be held on a Small Island Developing State, following the hugely successful Samoa 2015 Commonwealth Youth Games in September 2015. It was also the first Commonwealth Games event to be held in the Caribbean for over 50 years, with Commonwealth athletes last participating in the 1966 Commonwealth Games in Kingston, Jamaica.

The Games were coordinated by the Bahamas Commonwealth Games Association and the Bahamas' Ministry of Youth, Sports and Culture. The sports contested at the Bahamas 2017 were athletics, swimming, beach soccer, boxing, cycling (road), judo, rugby sevens, tennis, and beach volleyball. It was the first time judo, beach soccer, and beach volleyball have been presented at a Commonwealth Youth Games.

- Athletics – Thomas A. Robinson National Stadium
- Beach soccer – Bahamas Football Association National Stadium
- Beach volleyball - Queen Elizabeth Sports Center
- Boxing and judo – Sir Kendal G. L. Isaacs Gymnasium
- Cycling – Streets of New Providence
- Rugby sevens – Old Thomas A. Robinson Stadium
- Swimming – Betty Kelly-Kenning National Swim Complex
- Tennis – National Tennis Center

== Participating nations ==
There were 64 participating nations at the Games. The following countries did not send any athletes: Brunei, Cameroon, Falkland Islands, Montserrat, Seychelles and Swaziland. The number of athletes a nation entered is in parentheses beside the name of the country.

- Anguilla (5)
- Antigua and Barbuda (18)
- Australia (75)
- Bahamas (100) (host nation)
- Bangladesh (4)
- Barbados (9)
- Belize (5)
- Bermuda (20)
- Botswana (14)
- British Virgin Islands (8)
- Canada (60)
- Cayman Islands (9)
- Cook Islands (3)
- Cyprus (13)
- Dominica (6)
- England (73)
- Fiji (33)
- Ghana (11)
- Gibraltar (6)
- Grenada (6)
- Guernsey (9)
- Guyana (10)
- India (31)
- Isle of Man (8)
- Jamaica (30)
- Jersey (7)
- Kenya (4)
- Kiribati (5)
- Lesotho (6)
- Malta (5)
- Malawi (4)
- Malaysia (14)
- Mauritius (4)
- Mozambique (6)
- Namibia (9)
- Nauru (2)
- New Zealand (33)
- Nigeria (22)
- Niue (4)
- Norfolk Island (1)
- Northern Ireland (18)
- Pakistan (5)
- Papua New Guinea (8)
- Rwanda (4)
- Saint Helena (4)
- Saint Kitts and Nevis (9)
- Saint Lucia (23)
- Saint Vincent and the Grenadines (6)
- Samoa (21)
- Scotland (40)
- Sierra Leone (4)
- Singapore (40)
- Solomon Islands (3)
- South Africa (23)
- Sri Lanka (28)
- Tanzania (4)
- Tonga (4)
- Trinidad and Tobago (51)
- Turks and Caicos Islands (23)
- Tuvalu (2)
- Uganda (4)
- Vanuatu (2)
- Wales (38)
- Zambia (4)

== Sports ==
The 2017 Games featured nine sports and introduced three new sports—beach soccer, judo and beach volleyball—whilst dropping archery, lawn bowls, weightlifting, and squash. cycling also made a return during these Games.

- Athletics (29)
- Beach soccer (2)
- Beach volleyball (2)
- Boxing (11)
- Cycling (4)
- Judo (8)
- Rugby sevens (2)
- Swimming (35)
- Tennis (3)

== Schedule ==
| OC | Opening ceremony | ● | Event competitions | 1 | Event finals | CC | Closing ceremony |

| July | 18 Tue | 19 Wed | 20 Thu | 21 Fri | 22 Sat | 23 Sun | Events |
|---|---|---|---|---|---|---|---|
| Ceremonies | OC | | | | | CC | |
| Athletics | | | 7 | 5 | 8 | 9 | 29 |
| Beach Soccer | | ● | ● | ● | 2 | | 2 |
| Beach Volleyball | ● | ● | ● | ● | 2 | | 2 |
| Boxing | | ● | ● | ● | ● | 11 | 11 |
| Cycling | | 2 | | | | 2 | 4 |
| Judo | 8 | | | | | | 8 |
| Rugby sevens | | ● | ● | 2 | | | 2 |
| Swimming | | 9 | 9 | 9 | 8 | | 35 |
| Tennis | | ● | ● | ● | ● | 3 | 3 |
| Total events | 8 | 11 | 16 | 16 | 20 | 25 | 96 |
| Cumulative total | 8 | 19 | 35 | 51 | 71 | 96 | |
| July | 18 Tue | 19 Wed | 20 Thu | 21 Fri | 22 Sat | 23 Sun | Events |

== Medal table ==
| Rank | Nation | Gold | Silver | Bronze | Total |
|---|---|---|---|---|---|
| 1 | England | 23 | 16 | 12 | 51 |
| 2 | Australia | 14 | 14 | 11 | 39 |
| 3 | New Zealand | 8 | 14 | 9 | 31 |
| 4 | Scotland | 8 | 6 | 7 | 21 |
| 5 | South Africa | 8 | 3 | 7 | 18 |
| 6 | Singapore | 7 | 4 | 6 | 17 |
| 7 | India | 4 | 1 | 6 | 11 |
| 8 | Kenya | 3 | 1 | 0 | 4 |
| 9 | Canada | 2 | 7 | 9 | 18 |
| 10 | Wales | 2 | 6 | 5 | 13 |
| 11 | Northern Ireland | 2 | 5 | 5 | 12 |
| 12 | Jamaica | 2 | 3 | 4 | 9 |
| 13 | Trinidad and Tobago | 2 | 2 | 1 | 5 |
| 14 | Saint Lucia | 2 | 0 | 0 | 2 |
| 14 | Zambia | 2 | 0 | 0 | 2 |
| 16 | Bahamas* | 1 | 2 | 10 | 13 |
| 17 | Bermuda | 1 | 0 | 1 | 2 |
| 17 | Samoa | 1 | 0 | 1 | 2 |
| 19 | Antigua and Barbuda | 1 | 0 | 0 | 1 |
| 19 | Guernsey | 1 | 0 | 0 | 1 |
| 19 | Uganda | 1 | 0 | 0 | 1 |
| 22 | Cyprus | 0 | 4 | 2 | 6 |
| 23 | Sri Lanka | 0 | 2 | 0 | 2 |
| 24 | British Virgin Islands | 0 | 1 | 1 | 2 |
| 25 | Dominica | 0 | 1 | 0 | 1 |
| 25 | Guyana | 0 | 1 | 0 | 1 |
| 25 | Isle of Man | 0 | 1 | 0 | 1 |
| 25 | Mozambique | 0 | 1 | 0 | 1 |
| 29 | Botswana | 0 | 0 | 3 | 3 |
| 30 | Fiji | 0 | 0 | 2 | 2 |
| 31 | Grenada | 0 | 0 | 1 | 1 |
| 31 | Namibia | 0 | 0 | 1 | 1 |
| 31 | Rwanda | 0 | 0 | 1 | 1 |
| 31 | Tanzania | 0 | 0 | 1 | 1 |
| 31 | Turks and Caicos Islands | 0 | 0 | 1 | 1 |
| Totals (35 entries) | | 95 | 95 | 107 | 297 |

The host country is highlighted in lavender blue
