= 2026 OFC Beach Soccer Men's Nations Cup =

Tournament details
- Host country: Tahiti
- City: Papeete
- Dates: 24–31 October
- Teams: 4 (from 1 confederation)

Final positions
- Champions: Tahiti (5th title)
- Runners-up: Solomon Islands
- Third place: New Caledonia
- Fourth place: Vanuatu

Tournament statistics
- Matches played: 8
- Goals scored: 85 (10.63 per match)
- Attendance: 2,660 (333 per match)

The 2026 OFC Beach Soccer Men's Nations Cup was the ninth edition of the OFC Beach Soccer Men's Nations Cup, the premier beach soccer competition contested by men's national beach soccer teams who are members of the Oceania Football Confederation (OFC).

It took place from 24 October to 31 October 2026 in Papeete, Tahiti.

The tournament also acts as the qualification route for OFC teams to the 2027 FIFA Beach Soccer World Cup; the champions alone qualify.

Tahiti are the three-time defending champions.

== Host selection ==
Tahiti were selected as the host nation in May 2025, with the initial dates of the tournament set for 22–31 October 2026.

== Teams ==
Five teams originally entered the tournament as follows:

Team	Appearance	Previous best performance
New Caledonia	3rd	Runners-up (2013)
Papua New Guinea	2nd	Fourth place (2024)
Solomon Islands	9th	Champions (2006, 2007, 2009, 2013)
Tahiti (hosts)	8th	Champions (2011, 2019, 2023, 2024)
Vanuatu	6th	Runners-up (2006, 2007, 2009)

Did not enter

The following OFC members did not enter the tournament:

- American Samoa
- Cook Islands
- Fiji
- New Zealand
- Samoa
- Tonga

== Draw ==
The draw to allocate the teams to their respective positions in the group took place on 13 August 2026 at OFC headquarters in Auckland, New Zealand.

The draw resulted in the following composition of the group:

Pos	Team
1	Papua New Guinea
2	Solomon Islands
3	New Caledonia
4	Tahiti
5	Vanuatu

The original match schedule was revealed immediately following the draw.

Withdrawal of Papua New Guinea

On 21 October, one day before the original scheduled start of the tournament, the OFC announced the withdrawal of Papua New Guinea. A new schedule was released, with the start of the tournament postponed two days as a result, to 24 October.

== Squads ==
Each team entered a squad consisting of 12 players:

- New Caledonia
- Solomon Islands
- Tahiti
- Vanuatu

== Group stage ==
Each team earns three points for a win in regulation time, two points for a win in extra time, one point for a win in a penalty shoot-out, and no points for a defeat. The top two teams advance to the final, while the third and fourth placed teams compete in the third place match.

All times are local, TAHT (UTC−10).

Pos	Team	Pld	W	W+	WP	L	GF	GA	GD	Pts	Qualification
1	Tahiti (H)	3	3	0	0	0	37	8	+29	9	Final
2	Solomon Islands	3	2	0	0	1	21	14	+7	6	Final
3	New Caledonia	3	1	0	0	2	15	27	−12	3	Third place match
4	Vanuatu	3	0	0	0	3	8	32	−24	0	Third place match

Source: OFC
(H) Host
24 October 2026
14:00

New Caledonia	5–10	Solomon Islands
Ayawa 4'; Xanatre 20', 23'; Xowi 25'; Tagawa 36'	Report	Wanega 4', 14', 14'; Mara 5', 20', 29'; Mafane 10'; Funusui 12'; Melo 19'; Gope-Iwate 20' (o.g.)

Aorai Tini Hau, Papeete
Attendance: 200
Referee: Aurélien Planchais-Godefroy (Tahiti)
24 October 2026
16:00

Vanuatu	1–18	Tahiti
Alick 19'	Report	Tiniruarii 3', 3', 21', 24', 25'; Lesca 4', 5', 13'; Salem 6', 8', 9', 22', 23', 31', 32'; Labaste 11'; Paama 15'; Chan Kat 21'

Aorai Tini Hau, Papeete
Attendance: 500
Referee: Takuma Matsuda (Japan)

26 October 2026
14:00

New Caledonia	7–5	Vanuatu
Haewegene 8', 8', 9', 33'; Nonmeu 14'; Xowi 17', 32'	Report	Mesau 5'; Charley 20'; August 21', 27', 32'

Aorai Tini Hau, Papeete
Attendance: 60
Referee: Hugo Pado (Solomon Islands)
26 October 2026
16:00

Solomon Islands	4–7	Tahiti
Mafane 3'; Mara 12'; Bobby 18'; Wanega 26'	Report	Taiarui 1', 14'; Salem 13'; Tinirauarii 15', 15' (pen.), 30'; Labaste 34'

Aorai Tini Hau, Papeete
Attendance: 600
Referee: Takuma Matsuda (Japan)

28 October 2026
14:00

Vanuatu	2–7	Solomon Islands
Alick 4', 24'	Report	Fa'ari 8'; Mafane 9'; Bobby 15'; Ahua 20'; Otainao 24'; Melo 31', 32'

Aorai Tini Hau, Papeete
Referee: Aurélien Planchais-Godefroy (Tahiti)
28 October 2026
16:00

Tahiti	12–3	New Caledonia
Taiarui 2'; Salem 7', 15', 20' (pen.), 35'; Tinirauarii 10', 26', 29' (pen.); Labaste 18'; Tagawa (o.g.); Gope-Iwate (o.g.); Tze-Yu 23'	Report	Tagawa 9'; Nonmeu 25'; Gope-Iwate 35'

Aorai Tini Hau, Papeete
Attendance: 500
Referee: Rimpei Takahashi (Japan)

== Play-offs ==
=== Third place match ===
31 October 2026
14:00

New Caledonia	4–3	Vanuatu
Gope-Iwate 4' (pen.); Pautre 6', 32'; Xowi 24'	Report	Mesau 6'; Alick 19'; Berukilukilu 36'

Aorai Tini Hau, Papeete
Attendance: 150
Referee: Aurelien Planchais-Godefroy (France)

=== Final ===
31 October 2026
16:00

Tahiti	4–3	Solomon Islands
Li Fung Kuee 6'; Teamotuaitau 14'; Tinirauarii 17'; Tze-Yu 34'	Report	Fa’ari 6'; Melo 18'; Mafane 21'

Aorai Tini Hau, Papeete
Attendance: 650
Referee: Takuma Matsuda (Japan)
