= 2019 OFC Beach Soccer Nations Cup =

2019 FIFA Beach Soccer World Cup OFC qualifier

Tournament details
- Host country: Tahiti
- City: Papeete
- Dates: 17–22 June
- Teams: 5 (from 1 confederation)
- Venue: 1 (in 1 host city)

Final positions
- Champions: Tahiti (2nd title)
- Runners-up: Solomon Islands
- Third place: New Caledonia
- Fourth place: Vanuatu

Tournament statistics
- Matches played: 12
- Goals scored: 149 (12.42 per match)
- Attendance: 8,400 (700 per match)
- Top scorer: (French Polynesia) Patrick Tepa (12 goals)

The 2019 OFC Beach Soccer Nations Cup was the sixth edition of the OFC Beach Soccer Nations Cup (previously called the OFC Beach Soccer Championship), the premier beach soccer tournament contested by Oceanian men's national teams, organised by the Oceania Football Confederation (OFC). The competition returns after a six-year absence.

The tournament took place in Aorai Tini Hau, Papeete, Tahiti from 17 to 22 June 2019. It was originally scheduled to take place from 15 to 22 September 2018 in Pā'ōfa'i Gardens. However, in August 2018, it was announced that the tournament had been postponed until June 2019 in order to allow more teams to participate.

The tournament also acted as the qualification tournament for Oceanian teams to the 2019 FIFA Beach Soccer World Cup in Paraguay; the winners qualified.

The Solomon Islands were the defending champions, but lost in the final and so did not qualify.

== Teams ==
Thierry Ariiotima, president of the FTF, stated that the championship's new 2019 scheduling would allow at least six nations to enter the event. Eventually five teams were confirmed.

Team	Appearance	Previous best performance
New Caledonia	2nd	Runners-up (2013)
Solomon Islands (title holders)	6th	Champions (2006, 2007, 2009, 2013)
Tahiti (hosts)	5th	Champions (2011)
Tonga	1st	Debut
Vanuatu	5th	Runners-up (2006, 2007, 2009)

== Venue ==
The matches will be played at the Aorai Tini Hau in Papeete.

== Draw ==
The draw of the tournament was held on 9 April 2019 in Tahiti, at a beach soccer match between Tiki Tama and Green Warriors during the Festival des îles.

== Group stage ==
Each team earns three points for a win in regulation time, two points for a win in extra time, one point for a win in a penalty shoot-out, and no points for a defeat. The top two teams advance to the final, while the next two teams advance to the third place match.

All times are local, TAHT (UTC−10).

Pos	Team	Pld	W	W+	WP	L	GF	GA	GD	Pts	Qualification
1	Tahiti (H)	4	4	0	0	0	52	9	+43	12	Final
2	Solomon Islands	4	3	0	0	1	19	14	+5	9	Final
3	Vanuatu	4	2	0	0	2	33	22	+11	6	Third place match
4	New Caledonia	4	1	0	0	3	17	27	−10	3	Third place match
5	Tonga	4	0	0	0	4	6	55	−49	0	

Source: OFC
Rules for classification: Group stage tiebreakers
(H) Host
17 June 2019
14:00

New Caledonia	0–2	Solomon Islands
	Report	Mafane 21'; Fa'ari 24'

Aorai Tini Hau, Papeete
Attendance: 200
Referee: Aurélien Planchais-Godefroy (France)
17 June 2019
16:00

Tahiti	8–2	Vanuatu
Salem 4', 15'; Tepa 13', 17'; Labaste 13'; Chan Kat 29' (pen.); Li Fung Kuee 31'; Teriitau 31'	Report	Boulet 19'; Meltecoin 31' (pen.)

Aorai Tini Hau, Papeete
Attendance: 900
Referee: Hugo Pado (Solomon Islands)

18 June 2019
14:00

Vanuatu	2–4	Solomon Islands
Mansale 31'; Wilson 33'	Report	Mafane 14'; Koipala 30'; Fa'ari 32'; Aisa 36'

Aorai Tini Hau, Papeete
Attendance: 200
Referee: Pari Oito (Tahiti)
18 June 2019
16:00

Tahiti	23–1	Tonga
Tepa 1', 3', 12', 14', 17', 24'; Li Fung Kuee 2', 35', 36'; Tehau 5'; Labaste 7', 14', 30', 31'; Teriitau 10'; Chan Kat 15', 17', 26'; Tchen 28', 32', 36'; Taiarui 30', 32'	Report	Kaufusi 5'

Aorai Tini Hau, Papeete
Attendance: 1,000
Referee: Jimmy Malap (Vanuatu)

19 June 2019
14:00

Solomon Islands	7–1	Tonga
Naka 7'; Peter 9'; Fa'ari 10', 22'; Kaufusi 16' (o.g.); Havili 17' (o.g.); Mafane 26'	Report	Ulavalu 18'

Aorai Tini Hau, Papeete
Attendance: 100
Referee: Rudolphe Tau (Tahiti)
19 June 2019
16:00

Vanuatu	14–7	New Caledonia
Mansale 4', 32'; Boulet 5', 16', 20', 35'; Kapalu 6', 22'; Malapa 9'; Meltecoin 9', 33'; Tasip 16'; Massing 18'; Thomas 30'	Report	Athale 3', 8', 33'; Diaiké 23', 24'; Roine 29'; Wakanumune 34'

Aorai Tini Hau, Papeete
Attendance: 300
Referee: Faraz Hussein (Fiji)

20 June 2019
14:00

Tonga	1–10	New Caledonia
Uhatahi 12'	Report	Katrawa 10'; Weinane 12'; Wakanumune 15'; Takelo 20' (o.g.); Roine 21', 31', 36', 36'; Athale 25'; Diaiké 28'

Aorai Tini Hau, Papeete
Attendance: 200
Referee: Felix Bea (Tahiti)
20 June 2019
16:00

Solomon Islands	6–11	Tahiti
Peter 7', 10'; Naka 16'; Mafane 16', 19' (pen.); Tchen 32' (o.g.)	Report	Labaste 3', 13'; Taiarui 8', 24'; Teriitau 10', 16', 25'; Tavanae 26', 29'; Tepa 27', 28'

Aorai Tini Hau, Papeete
Attendance: 1,500
Referee: Malkom Mayoho (Vanuatu)

21 June 2019
14:00

Tonga	3–15	Vanuatu
Uhatahi 15'; Havili 35'; Tutone 36'	Report	Mansale 6', 10', 29'; Kapalu 6' (pen.), 15'; Meltecoin 12', 30', 35'; Wilson 19', 20'; Boulet 21', 26', 30', 33'; Iaruel 36'

Aorai Tini Hau, Papeete
Attendance: 200
Referee: Aurélien Planchais-Godefroy (France)
21 June 2019
16:00

New Caledonia	0–10	Tahiti
	Report	Taiarui 1', 13', 25'; Chan Kat 4'; Tehau 7', 8'; Tavanae 11'; Labaste 27', 35'; Tepa 31'

Aorai Tini Hau, Papeete
Attendance: 1,200
Referee: Hugo Pado (Solomon Islands)

== Final stage ==
=== Bracket ===
Final
22 June
Tahiti	4
Solomon Islands	3

Third place match
22 June
Vanuatu	7
New Caledonia	8

=== Third place match ===
22 June 2019
14:00

Vanuatu	7–8 (a.e.t.)	New Caledonia
Mansale 11'; Wilson 13', 26'; Boulet 27', 28'; Thomas 31'; Tasip 34'	Report	Bamy 6'; Roine 11' (pen.), 23', 26'; Katrawa 12'; Dokunengo 21', 37'; Athale 27'

Aorai Tini Hau, Papeete
Attendance: 1,100
Referee: Hugo Pado (Solomon Islands)

=== Final ===
22 June 2019
16:00

Tahiti	4–3	Solomon Islands
Tepa 22' (pen.); Tavanae 22', 27'; Taiarui 30'	Report	Farobo 18'; Aisa 28'; Mafane 36'

Aorai Tini Hau, Papeete
Attendance: 1,500
Referee: Faraz Hussein (Fiji)

Tahiti qualifies for the 2019 FIFA Beach Soccer World Cup.

== Qualified teams for FIFA Beach Soccer World Cup ==
The following team from OFC qualify for the 2019 FIFA Beach Soccer World Cup.

Team	Qualified on	Previous appearances in FIFA Beach Soccer World Cup^{1} only FIFA era (since 2005)
Tahiti	22 June 2019	4 (2011, 2013, 2015, 2017)

^{1} Bold indicates champions for that year. Italic indicates hosts for that year.
