= OFC Beach Soccer Men's Nations Cup =

- Organiser(s): OFC
- Founded: 2006; 20 years ago
- Region: Oceania
- Teams: 4
- Current champions: Tahiti (5th title)
- Most championships: Tahiti (5 titles)
- Website: OFC
- 2024 OFC Beach Soccer Men's Nations Cup

The OFC Beach Soccer Nations Cup is the main championship for beach soccer in Oceania, contested between the senior men's national teams of the members of the Oceania Football Confederation (OFC). It is the sport's version of the better known OFC Nations Cup in association football.

The winners of the championship are crowned continental champions; the tournament also acts as the qualification route for Oceanian nations to the upcoming edition of the FIFA Beach Soccer World Cup and is therefore also known as the FIFA Beach Soccer World Cup OFC qualifier. Coinciding with the annual staging of the World Cup, the competition took place yearly until 2009; the World Cup then became biennial, and as its supplementary qualification event, the championship followed suit.

The championship was established in 2006 after FIFA made it a requirement for all confederations to begin holding qualification tournaments to determine the best national team(s) in their region and hence those who would proceed to represent their continent in the upcoming World Cup (previously, nations were simply invited to play). FIFA currently allocate Oceania one berth at the World Cup and hence only the winners qualify to the World Cup finals.

Oceania's governing body for football, the OFC, organise the championship. Cooperation has also come from Beach Soccer Worldwide (BSWW), particularly in the initial tournaments. The competition was held under the title of the OFC Beach Soccer Championship until 2019 when the name was changed to OFC Beach Soccer Nations Cup, bringing it in line with the naming of other OFC senior national tournaments.

The Solomon Islands and Tahiti are the most successful nation with four titles each. Tahiti also are the current champions. These two nations are the only teams to qualify to the World Cup thus far.

== Results ==
There have been seven editions of the championship as of 2023. For all tournaments, the winners qualified for the FIFA Beach Soccer World Cup.

Year	Location	Final			Third place match		
Year	Location	Champions	Score	Runners-up	Third place	Score	Fourth place
OFC Beach Soccer Championship
2006 details	(French Polynesia) Tema'e, Tahiti	Solomon Islands	6–2	Vanuatu	Tahiti	12–4	Cook Islands
2007 details	Auckland, New Zealand	Solomon Islands	5–3	Vanuatu	New Zealand	5–3	Tahiti
2009 details	(French Polynesia) Tema'e, Tahiti	Solomon Islands	1–0	Vanuatu	Tahiti	6–3	Fiji
2011 details	(French Polynesia) Papeete, Tahiti	Tahiti	4–3	Solomon Islands	Fiji	—	
2013 details	Nouméa, New Caledonia^{[a]}	Solomon Islands	^{[round-robin]}	New Caledonia	Vanuatu	—	
OFC Beach Soccer Nations Cup
2019 details	(French Polynesia) Papeete, Tahiti	Tahiti	4–3	Solomon Islands	New Caledonia	8–7 (a.e.t.)	Vanuatu
2023 details	(French Polynesia) Papeete, Tahiti	Tahiti	7–0	Solomon Islands	Fiji	12–0	Tonga
2024 details	Honiara, Solomon Islands	Tahiti	3–2	Solomon Islands	Fiji	4–0	Papua New Guinea
2026 details	(French Polynesia) Papeete, Tahiti	Tahiti	4–3	Solomon Islands	New Caledonia	4–3	Vanuatu

Notes:

a. The 2013 edition was originally set to take place in Papeete, Tahiti. However, despite being defending champions, Tahiti were unable to compete due to a pre-arranged tour of Europe to play against higher level opposition in preparation as host nation of the upcoming World Cup. Hence the competition was relocated to New Caledonia.
Round-robin Indicates this edition was played as a round-robin tournament. There was no final or third place match.

Unrealised editions:

In addition to the above tournaments, a further four editions were scheduled but ultimately did not take place as follows:

1. 2008: The OFC was unable to organise the 2008 edition in time, due to a late calendar change bringing the 2008 World Cup forward from November to July. Hence, on the back of their two previous titles, the Solomon Islands were hand-picked by the OFC to be the confederation's representative at the World Cup.
2. 2015: The 2015 edition was originally set to take place in Papeete, Tahiti. Due to undisclosed circumstances, the tournament was cancelled. Tahiti were hand-picked by the OFC to be the confederation's representative at the World Cup.
3. 2017: The 2017 edition was originally set to take place in February. Due to undisclosed circumstances, the tournament was cancelled. Tahiti were hand-picked by the OFC to be the confederation's representative at the World Cup.
4. 2021: The 2021 edition was originally set to take place in January in Tahiti. Due to the COVID-19 pandemic, the tournament was initially postponed and subsequently cancelled entirely. Tahiti were hand-picked by the OFC to be the confederation's representative at the World Cup, based on being the highest ranked Oceanian nation in the then current release of the BSWW World Rankings and being reigning regional champions.

== Performance ==
=== Successful nations ===
Team	Titles	Runners-up	Third place
Tahiti	5 (2011*, 2019*, 2023*, 2024, 2026*)	–	2 (2006*, 2009*)
Solomon Islands	4 (2006, 2007, 2009, 2013)	5 (2011, 2019, 2023, 2024, 2026)	–
Vanuatu	–	3 (2006, 2007, 2009)	1 (2013)
New Caledonia	–	1 (2013*)	2 (2019, 2026)
Fiji	–	–	3 (2011, 2023, 2024)
New Zealand	–	–	1 (2007*)

* = Hosts

=== Awards ===
Year	Top goalscorer(s)	Gls	Best player	Best goalkeeper	Fair play	Ref.
(French Polynesia) 2006	(French Polynesia) Teiva Izal	11	(French Polynesia) Teiva Izal	(Vanuatu) Chikau Mansale	Cook Islands	
(New Zealand) 2007	(French Polynesia) Teva Zaveroni	11	(Solomon Islands) James Naka	(Vanuatu) Chikau Mansale	New Zealand	
(French Polynesia) 2009	(Solomon Islands) James Naka	7	(Solomon Islands) James Naka	(Vanuatu) Chikau Mansale	Vanuatu	
(French Polynesia) 2011	(Solomon Islands) James Naka (Fiji) Ratu Dugucagi (Solomon Islands) Robert Laua	4	(Solomon Islands) James Naka	(French Polynesia) Jonathan Torohia	Fiji	
(New Caledonia) 2013	(Solomon Islands) Joe Luwi	5	(Solomon Islands) Samson Takayama	(Solomon Islands) Fred Hale	not awarded	
(French Polynesia) 2019	(French Polynesia) Patrick Tepa	12	(French Polynesia) Heimanu Taiarui	(French Polynesia) Jonathan Torohia	Solomon Islands	
(French Polynesia) 2023	(Fiji) Gabiriele Matanisiga	12	(French Polynesia) Heirauarii Salem	(French Polynesia) Jonathan Torohia	Fiji; Tahiti	

=== All-time top goalscorers ===
As of 2023

The following table shows the all-time top goalscorers (minimum 10 goals).

Rank	Player	Team	Goals
1	James Naka	Solomon Islands	34
2	Patrick Tepa	Tahiti	21
3	Teva Zaveroni	Tahiti	18
4	Raimana Li Fung Kuee	Tahiti	17
5	Seule Soromon	Vanuatu	15
6	Teva Izal	Tahiti	14
6	Henry Koto	Solomon Islands	14
8	Max Fa'ari	Solomon Islands	12
8	Gabiriele Matanisiga	Fiji	12
10	Loic Boulet	Vanuatu	11
10	Tearii Labaste	Tahiti	11
10	Heirauarii Salem	Tahiti	11
13	Fenedy Masauvakalo	Vanuatu	10
13	Heimanu Taiarui	Tahiti	10

2006, 2007, 2009, 2011, 2013: (a, b, c), 2019, 2023: ( a, b, c)

=== All-time table ===
As of 2023

Pos	Team	App	Pld	W	W+	WP	L	GF	GA	GD	Pts
1	Solomon Islands	7	26	19	0	0	7	136	86	+50	57
2	Tahiti	6	24	16	0	0	8	179	88	+91	48
3	Vanuatu	5	19	9	2	0	8	117	90	+27	31
4	New Caledonia	2	7	2	1	0	4	32	46	–14	8
5	Fiji	3	10	2	0	0	8	62	61	+1	6
6	New Zealand	1	4	1	0	0	3	21	26	–5	3
7	Cook Islands	1	4	0	0	0	4	6	49	–43	0
8	Tonga	2	8	0	0	0	8	15	129	–114	0

Key: Appearances App / Won in normal time W = 3 points / Won in extra-time W+ = 2 points / Won on penalty shoot-out WP = 1 point / Lost L = 0 points

=== Appearances & performance timeline ===
The following is a performance timeline of the teams who have appeared in the OFC Beach Soccer Nations Cup and how many appearances they each have made.

Legend

- 1st – Champions
- 2nd – Runners-up
- 3rd – Third place
- 4th – Fourth place
- 5th – Fifth place
- × – Did not enter
- •• – Entered but withdrew
- – Hosts
- Apps – No. of appearances

Timeline

Year Team	2006 (French Polynesia) (4)	2007 (New Zealand) (4)	2009 (French Polynesia) (4)	2011 (French Polynesia) (3)	2013 (New Caledonia) (3)	2019 (French Polynesia) (5)	2023 (French Polynesia) (4)	2024 (Solomon Islands) (4)	2026 (French Polynesia) (4)	Apps /9
Cook Islands	4th	×	×	×	×	×	×	×	×	1
Fiji	×	×	4th	3rd	×	×	3rd	3rd	×	4
New Caledonia	×	×	×	×	2nd	3rd	×	×	3rd	3
New Zealand	×	3rd	×	×	×	×	×	×	×	1
Papua New Guinea	×	×	×	×	×	×	×	4th	••	1
Solomon Islands	1st	1st	1st	2nd	1st	2nd	2nd	2nd	2nd	9
Tahiti	3rd	4th	3rd	1st	••	1st	1st	1st	1st	8
Tonga	×	×	×	×	×	5th	4th	×	×	2
Vanuatu	2nd	2nd	2nd	••	3rd	4th	×	×	4th	5

=== Performance of qualifiers at the World Cup ===
The following is a performance timeline of the OFC teams who have gone on to appear in the World Cup, having qualified from the above events (including the years when the event did not take place and instead the qualifying team was handpicked by the OFC, being 2008, 2015, 2017 and 2021).

Legend

- 1st – Champions
- 2nd – Runners-up
- 3rd – Third place
- 4th – Fourth place
- – Hosts
- QF – Quarter-finals
- R1 – Round 1 (group stage)
- q – Qualified for upcoming tournament
- Total – Total times qualified for World Cup

Timeline

Year Team	(Brazil) 2006	(Brazil) 2007	(France) 2008	(United Arab Emirates) 2009	(Italy) 2011	(French Polynesia) 2013	(Portugal) 2015	(The Bahamas) 2017	(Paraguay) 2019	(Russia) 2021	(United Arab Emirates) 2023	(Seychelles) 2025	Total
Solomon Islands	R1	R1	R1	R1		R1							5
Tahiti					R1	4th	2nd	2nd	R1	QF	QF	R1	8
Total no. of unique qualifiers													2
