= 2021 OFC Beach Soccer Nations Cup =

2021 FIFA Beach Soccer World Cup OFC qualifier

Tournament details
- Host country: Tahiti
- City: Papeete
- Dates: Cancelled
- Teams: 8 (expected) (from 1 confederation)

The 2021 OFC Beach Soccer Nations Cup was originally to be the seventh edition of the OFC Beach Soccer Nations Cup (previously called the OFC Beach Soccer Championship prior to 2019), the premier beach soccer tournament contested by Oceanian men's national teams, organised by the Oceania Football Confederation (OFC).

The tournament would originally take place in Aorai Tini Hau, Papeete, Tahiti. It was originally scheduled to be played between 11–16 January 2021, and it was expected that at least eight teams would participate. However, the OFC announced on 5 November 2020 that the tournament had been rescheduled due to the COVID-19 pandemic, and would take place no later than 6 June 2021, and was provisionally scheduled between 10–15 May 2021. On 4 March 2021, the OFC announced that a new date would be confirmed following consultation with FIFA. The tournament was eventually cancelled, with the official announcement made by the OFC on 6 May 2021.

Tahiti were the defending champions.

== Qualified teams for FIFA Beach Soccer World Cup ==
The championship would also have acted as the qualification tournament for Oceanaian teams to the 2021 FIFA Beach Soccer World Cup in Russia; the winners would have qualified. The OFC announced that Tahiti, as the highest-ranked OFC team in the BSWW World Rankings and also as the winner of the most recent edition in 2019, were nominated as the OFC representatives at the 2021 FIFA Beach Soccer World Cup.

Team	Qualified on	Previous appearances in FIFA Beach Soccer World Cup^{1} only FIFA era (since 2005)
Tahiti	6 May 2021	5 (2011, 2013, 2015, 2017, 2019)

^{1} Bold indicates champions for that year. Italic indicates hosts for that year.
