= New Zealand national beach soccer team =

New Zealand
- Association: New Zealand Football
- Confederation: OFC (Oceania)
- Top scorer: Nathan Fry (7)
- FIFA code: NZL
First colours
Second colours

First international
- New Zealand 5–9 Tahiti (Auckland, New Zealand; 31 August 2006)

Biggest win
- New Zealand 5–3 Tahiti (Auckland, New Zealand; 3 September 2006)

Biggest defeat
- New Zealand 5–9 Tahiti (Auckland, New Zealand; 31 August 2006)

OFC Beach Soccer Championship
- Appearances: 1 (first in 2007)
- Best result: Third place (2007)

The New Zealand national beach soccer team represents New Zealand in international beach soccer competitions. They are controlled by NZF, the governing body for soccer in New Zealand. To date, New Zealand has competed in one OFC Beach Soccer Championship, in 2007.

== Squad ==
Correct as of July 2007.

Note: Flags indicate national team as defined under FIFA eligibility rules; some limited exceptions apply. Players may hold more than one non-FIFA nationality.

No.	Pos.	Nation	Player
1			Mitchell O'Brien
2			Simon Eaddy
3			Joel Matthews
4			David Samson
5			Dean Johnston

No.	Pos.	Nation	Player
6			Mikael Munday
7			Stuart James Hogg
8			Nathan Fry
9			Michael Gwyther
10			Daniel Ellensohn (c)

== Competitive record ==
=== OFC Beach Soccer Nations Cup ===
OFC Beach Soccer Nations Cup record
Year	Round	Position	Pld	W	W+	L	GF	GA
(French Polynesia) 2006	Did not enter							
(New Zealand) 2007	Third place	3rd	4	1	0	3	21	26
(French Polynesia) 2009	Did not enter							
(French Polynesia) 2011	Did not enter							
(New Caledonia) 2013	Did not enter							
(French Polynesia) 2019	Did not enter							
(French Polynesia) 2023	Did not enter							
(Solomon Islands) 2024	Did not enter							
Total	Third place	1/8	4	1	0	3	21	26

== Achievements ==
- OFC Beach Soccer Nations Cup
  - (bronze) Third place (1): 2007
