= New Zealand national football team =

New Zealand national football team might refer to:

- New Zealand men's national football team
- New Zealand women's national football team
- New Zealand national American football team
- New Zealand national Australian rules football team
- New Zealand national beach soccer team
