= 2027 FIFA Beach Soccer World Cup =

Tournament details
- Host country: TBA
- City: TBA
- Dates: TBA
- Teams: 16 (from 6 confederations)

The 2027 FIFA Beach Soccer World Cup will be the 14th edition of the FIFA Beach Soccer World Cup, an international beach soccer championship contested by senior men's national teams of the member associations of FIFA. Overall, this will the 24th edition of a world cup in beach soccer since the establishment of the Beach Soccer World Championships which preceded this competition from 1995 to 2004 and was not governed by FIFA; all world cups took place annually until 2009 when it then became a biennial event.

Brazil will be the defending champions.

== Host selection ==
The following national associations have declared their interest in bidding to host the tournament:

- El Salvador
- Mexico
- Spain
- Japan
- Saudi Arabia
- Brazil

== Qualification ==
A total of 16 teams are expected to qualify for the final tournament. In addition to the host country which qualifies automatically, 15 other teams will qualify from six separate continental competitions. The final slot allocation has yet to be confirmed by FIFA.

The process of qualification for the World Cup finals began in September 2026 with Angola versus Mauritius in qualifying for the African championship, and will end in 2027.

Note: The appearance statistics below refer only to the FIFA era of world cups in beach soccer (since 2005); see this article for the inclusion of World Championships era stats (1995–2004).

Confederation (Region; slots)	Qualifying tournament (Dates of tournament)	Team qualified	Appearances				Previous best performance
Confederation (Region; slots)	Qualifying tournament (Dates of tournament)	Team qualified	Total	First	Last	Streak	Previous best performance
TBA	Hosts (automatic qualification)	TBD					
AFC (Asia; 3 teams)	2026 AFC Beach Soccer Asian Cup (18–28 November 2026)	TBD					
AFC (Asia; 3 teams)	2026 AFC Beach Soccer Asian Cup (18–28 November 2026)	TBD					
AFC (Asia; 3 teams)	2026 AFC Beach Soccer Asian Cup (18–28 November 2026)	TBD					
CAF (Africa; 2 teams)	2026 Beach Soccer Africa Cup of Nations (28 November – 6 December 2026)	TBD					
CAF (Africa; 2 teams)	2026 Beach Soccer Africa Cup of Nations (28 November – 6 December 2026)	TBD					
CONCACAF (North America; (Note: Comprising Northern America, Central America, and the Caribbean.) 2 teams)	2027 CONCACAF Beach Soccer Championship (10–16 May 2027)	TBD					
CONCACAF (North America; 2 teams)	2027 CONCACAF Beach Soccer Championship (10–16 May 2027)	TBD					
CONMEBOL (South America; 3 teams)	2027 Copa América of Beach Soccer (TBA 2027)	TBD					
CONMEBOL (South America; 3 teams)	2027 Copa América of Beach Soccer (TBA 2027)	TBD					
CONMEBOL (South America; 3 teams)	2027 Copa América of Beach Soccer (TBA 2027)	TBD					
OFC (Oceania; 1 team)	2026 OFC Beach Soccer Men's Nations Cup (24–31 October 2026)	Tahiti	9th	2011	2025	9	Runners-up (2015, 2017)
UEFA (Europe; 4 teams)	2027 FIFA Beach Soccer World Cup qualification (UEFA) (TBA 2027)	TBD					
UEFA (Europe; 4 teams)	2027 FIFA Beach Soccer World Cup qualification (UEFA) (TBA 2027)	TBD					
UEFA (Europe; 4 teams)	2027 FIFA Beach Soccer World Cup qualification (UEFA) (TBA 2027)	TBD					
UEFA (Europe; 4 teams)	2027 FIFA Beach Soccer World Cup qualification (UEFA) (TBA 2027)	TBD					
