= Tahiti national beach soccer team =

Tahiti
- Nickname: Tiki Toa (The Warrior Gods)
- Association: Tahitian Football Federation
- Confederation: OFC (Oceania)
- Head coach: Teva Zaveroni
- Captain: Raimana Li Fung Kuee
- FIFA code: TAH
- BSWW ranking: 12 ▼2 (2 September 2026)
First colours
Second colours

First international
- Tahiti 8–1 Cook Islands (Temae, Tahiti; 31 August 2006)

Biggest win
- Tahiti 26–3 Tonga (Papeete, Tahiti; 22 August 2023)

Biggest defeat
- Spain 9–1 Tahiti (Dubai, United Arab Emirates; 9 November 2018); Italy 12–4 Tahiti (Luque, Paraguay; 21 November 2019)

World Cup
- Appearances: 9 (first in 2011)
- Best result: (silver) Runners-up (2015, 2017)

OFC Beach Soccer Nations Cup
- Appearances: 7 (first in 2006)
- Best result: (gold) Champions (2011, 2019, 2023, 2024)

The Tahiti national beach soccer team represents Tahiti or French Polynesia in international beach soccer competitions and is controlled by the FTF and the FFF, the governing body for football in Tahiti. In contrast to the fortunes of the association football team, Tahiti's beach soccer has, since 2011, been one of the strongest teams in world beach soccer. The team made history at the 2013 FIFA Beach Soccer World Cup by becoming the first Pacific nation to qualify for the knockout stages of an international FIFA tournament. At the 2015 FIFA Beach Soccer World Cup Tahiti beat Italy in a penalty shootout to become the first Pacific nation to ever make it to a final in a FIFA tournament. They followed this up with another appearance in the 2017 final.

== Results and fixtures ==
The following is a list of match results in the last 12 months, as well as any future matches that have been scheduled.

Legend

Win Draw Lose Fixture

== Players ==
=== Current squad ===
The following players and staff members were called up for the 2021 FIFA Beach Soccer World Cup.

Note: Flags indicate national team as defined under FIFA eligibility rules; some limited exceptions apply. Players may hold more than one non-FIFA nationality.

| No. | Pos. | Nation | Player |
|---|---|---|---|
| 1 | GK | TAH | Jonathan Torohia |
| 2 | MF | TAH | Dylan Paama |
| 3 | FW | TAH | Tamatoa Tetauira |
| 4 | DF | TAH | Heimanu Taiarui |
| 5 | FW | TAH | Gervais Chan-Kat |
| 6 | MF | TAH | Patrick Tepa |
| 7 | FW | TAH | Raimana Li Fung Kuee |

| No. | Pos. | Nation | Player |
|---|---|---|---|
| 8 | MF | TAH | Heiarii Tavanae |
| 9 | MF | TAH | Heirauarii Salem |
| 10 | FW | TAH | Tearii Labaste |
| 11 | MF | TAH | Teva Zaveroni |
| 12 | GK | TAH | Beo Revel |
| 13 | MF | TAH | Teaonui Tehau |
| 14 | GK | TAH | Gabriel Amau |

Head coach: Teva Zaveroni

== Competitive record ==
=== FIFA Beach Soccer World Cup ===
| FIFA World Cup record | | | | | | | | | | Qualification (OFC) record | | | | | | | | |
| Year | Round | Pos | Pld | W | W+ | L | GF | GA | GD | Round | Pos | Pld | W | W+ | L | GF | GA | GD |
|---|---|---|---|---|---|---|---|---|---|---|---|---|---|---|---|---|---|---|
| (Brazil) 2005 | did not enter | | | | | | | | | No qualification matches | | | | | | | | |
| (Brazil) 2006 | did not qualify | | | | | | | | | Third place | 3rd | 4 | 3 | 0 | 1 | 26 | 13 | +13 |
| (Brazil) 2007 | did not qualify | | | | | | | | | Fourth place | 4th | 4 | 1 | 0 | 3 | 22 | 23 | –1 |
| (France) 2008 | did not enter | | | | | | | | | No qualification matches | | | | | | | | |
| (United Arab Emirates) 2009 | did not qualify | | | | | | | | | Third place | 3rd | 4 | 2 | 0 | 2 | 21 | 17 | +4 |
| (Italy) 2011 | Group stage | 12th | 3 | 1 | 0 | 2 | 6 | 11 | –5 | Champions | 1st | 3 | 2 | 0 | 1 | 11 | 12 | –1 |
| (French Polynesia) 2013 | Fourth place | 4th | 6 | 2 | 1 | 3 | 26 | 22 | +4 | Automatically qualified as hosts | | | | | | | | |
| (Portugal) 2015 | Runners-up | 2nd | 6 | 4 | 1 | 1 | 32 | 29 | +3 | No qualification matches (Note: The 2015 edition was originally set to take place in Papeete, Tahiti. Due to undisclosed circumstances, the tournament was cancelled. Tahiti were hand-picked by the OFC to be the confederation's representative at the World Cup.) | | | | | | | | |
| (The Bahamas) 2017 | Runners-up | 2nd | 6 | 3 | 1 | 2 | 20 | 22 | –2 | No qualification matches (Note: The 2017 edition was originally set to take place in February. Due to undisclosed circumstances, the tournament was cancelled. Tahiti were hand-picked by the OFC to be the confederation's representative at the World Cup.) | | | | | | | | |
| (Paraguay) 2019 | Group stage | 10th | 3 | 2 | 0 | 1 | 16 | 17 | –1 | Champions | 1st | 6 | 5 | 0 | 1 | 56 | 12 | +44 |
| (Russia) 2021 | Quarter-finals | 6th | 4 | 2 | 0 | 2 | 27 | 24 | +3 | No qualification matches (Note: Due to the COVID-19 pandemic, the Oceania qualification tournament was eventually cancelled, with the official announcement made by the OFC on 6 May 2021. The OFC announced that Tahiti, as the highest-ranked OFC team in the BSWW World Rankings and also as the winner of the most recent edition in 2019, were nominated as the OFC representatives at the 2021 FIFA Beach Soccer World Cup.) | | | | | | | | |
| (United Arab Emirates) 2023 | Quarter-finals | | 4 | 2 | 0 | 2 | 19 | 17 | +2 | Champions | 1st | 4 | 4 | 0 | 0 | 48 | 9 | +39 |
| (Seychelles) 2025 | Group stage | 14th | 3 | 0 | 0 | 3 | 12 | 21 | −9 | Champions | 1st | 4 | 4 | 0 | 0 | 39 | 17 | +22 |
| Total | 0 titles | 8/13 | 35 | 16 | 3 | 16 | 158 | 163 | –5 | 4 titles | 7/8 | 25 | 21 | 0 | 8 | 223 | 103 | +120 |

=== Intercontinental Cup ===
BSIC record
| Year | Round | Pos | Pld | W | W+ | L | GF | GA | GD |
|---|---|---|---|---|---|---|---|---|---|
| (United Arab Emirates) 2011 | Group stage | 8th | 3 | 0 | 0 | 3 | 7 | 19 | –12 |
| (United Arab Emirates) 2012 | Group stage | 6th | 3 | 1 | 0 | 2 | 8 | 10 | –2 |
| (United Arab Emirates) 2013 | did not enter | | | | | | | | |
| (United Arab Emirates) 2014 | did not enter | | | | | | | | |
| (United Arab Emirates) 2015 | Runners-up | 2nd | 5 | 4 | 0 | 1 | 23 | 17 | +6 |
| (United Arab Emirates) 2016 | Fourth place | 4th | 5 | 2 | 0 | 3 | 25 | 29 | –4 |
| (United Arab Emirates) 2017 | did not enter | | | | | | | | |
| (United Arab Emirates) 2018 | Group stage | 8th | 5 | 0 | 1 | 4 | 22 | 33 | –11 |
| Total | 0 titles | 5/8 | 21 | 7 | 1 | 13 | 85 | 108 | –23 |

=== OFC Beach Soccer Nations Cup ===
OFC Nations Cup record
| Year | Round | Pos | Pld | W | W+ | L | GF | GA | GD |
|---|---|---|---|---|---|---|---|---|---|
| (French Polynesia) 2006 | Third place | 3rd | 4 | 2 | 0 | 2 | 26 | 13 | +13 |
| (New Zealand) 2007 | Fourth place | 4th | 4 | 1 | 0 | 3 | 17 | 25 | –8 |
| (French Polynesia) 2009 | Third place | 3rd | 4 | 2 | 0 | 2 | 21 | 17 | +4 |
| (French Polynesia) 2011 | Champions | 1st | 3 | 2 | 0 | 1 | 11 | 12 | –1 |
| (New Caledonia) 2013 | Withdrew (Note: see above) | | | | | | | | |
| 2015 and 2017 | Not held (Note: see above) | | | | | | | | |
| (French Polynesia) 2019 | Champions | 1st | 5 | 5 | 0 | 0 | 56 | 12 | +44 |
| (French Polynesia) 2023 | Champions | 1st | 4 | 4 | 0 | 0 | 48 | 9 | +39 |
| (Solomon Islands) 2024 | Champions | 1st | 4 | 4 | 0 | 0 | 39 | 17 | +22 |
| Total | 4 titles | 8/9 | 28 | 20 | 0 | 8 | 218 | 105 | +113 |

== Head-to-head record ==
As of 27 August 2023

Note: The following includes all friendly matches and competitive games except for a small handful of friendlies not played by the official rules of FIFA.

Since making their international debut in August 2006, Tahiti have played a total of 118 matches against 41 different national teams, 68 of which were won. Their most played fixture is against the Solomon Islands whom they have played nine times.

| Team | First | Last | Record | Win % |
|---|---|---|---|---|
| Cook Islands | 2006 | 2006 | 2–0 | 100% |
| Solomon Islands | 2006 | 2023 | 5–4 | 56% |
| Vanuatu | 2006 | 2019 | 1–3 | 25% |
| New Zealand | 2007 | 2007 | 1–1 | 50% |
| Fiji | 2009 | 2023 | 4–0 | 100% |
| Mexico | 2011 | 2019 | 3–1 | 75% |
| Venezuela | 2011 | 2011 | 1–0 | 100% |
| Russia | 2011 | 2018 | 1–7 | 13% |
| Nigeria | 2011 | 2019 | 0–3 | 0% |
| United Arab Emirates | 2011 | 2021 | 3–4 | 43% |
| Switzerland | 2012 | 2018 | 2–6 | 25% |
| United States | 2012 | 2019 | 5–0 | 100% |
| France | 2013 | 2013 | 3–0 | 100% |
| Netherlands | 2013 | 2013 | 3–0 | 100% |
| Bulgaria | 2013 | 2013 | 0–1 | 0% |
| Hungary | 2013 | 2013 | 1–0 | 100% |
| Estonia | 2013 | 2013 | 1–0 | 100% |
| Austria | 2013 | 2013 | 1–0 | 100% |
| Argentina | 2013 | 2013 | 2–0 | 100% |
| Australia | 2013 | 2013 | 1–0 | 100% |
| Spain | 2013 | 2021 | 1–3 | 25% |
| Brazil | 2013 | 2017 | 0–4 | 0% |
| England | 2014 | 2018 | 3–0 | 100% |
| Madagascar | 2015 | 2015 | 1–0 | 100% |
| Paraguay | 2015 | 2019 | 2–1 | 67% |
| Iran | 2015 | 2018 | 2–4 | 33% |
| Italy | 2015 | 2019 | 1–1 | 50% |
| Portugal | 2015 | 2015 | 1–1 | 50% |
| Egypt | 2015 | 2015 | 1–0 | 100% |
| Bahamas | 2016 | 2016 | 1–1 | 50% |
| Japan | 2016 | 2021 | 1–4 | 20% |
| Poland | 2016 | 2017 | 2–0 | 100% |
| Ecuador | 2017 | 2017 | 1–0 | 100% |
| Panama | 2017 | 2017 | 1–0 | 100% |
| El Salvador | 2017 | 2017 | 1–0 | 100% |
| Oman | 2018 | 2019 | 1–1 | 50% |
| Tonga | 2019 | 2023 | 2–0 | 100% |
| New Caledonia | 2019 | 2019 | 1–0 | 100% |
| Uruguay | 2019 | 2019 | 1–0 | 100% |
| Mozambique | 2021 | 2021 | 1–0 | 100% |
| Lithuania | 2023 | 2023 | 3–0 | 100% |
| Totals | 2006 | 2023 | 68–50 | 58% |

== Honours ==
- OFC Beach Soccer Nations Cup

Winners: 2011, 2019, 2023, 2024

- FIFA Beach Soccer World Cup

Runners-up: 2015, 2017
Fourth place: 2013
