= Angelo Tchen =

Tahitian footballer (born 1982)

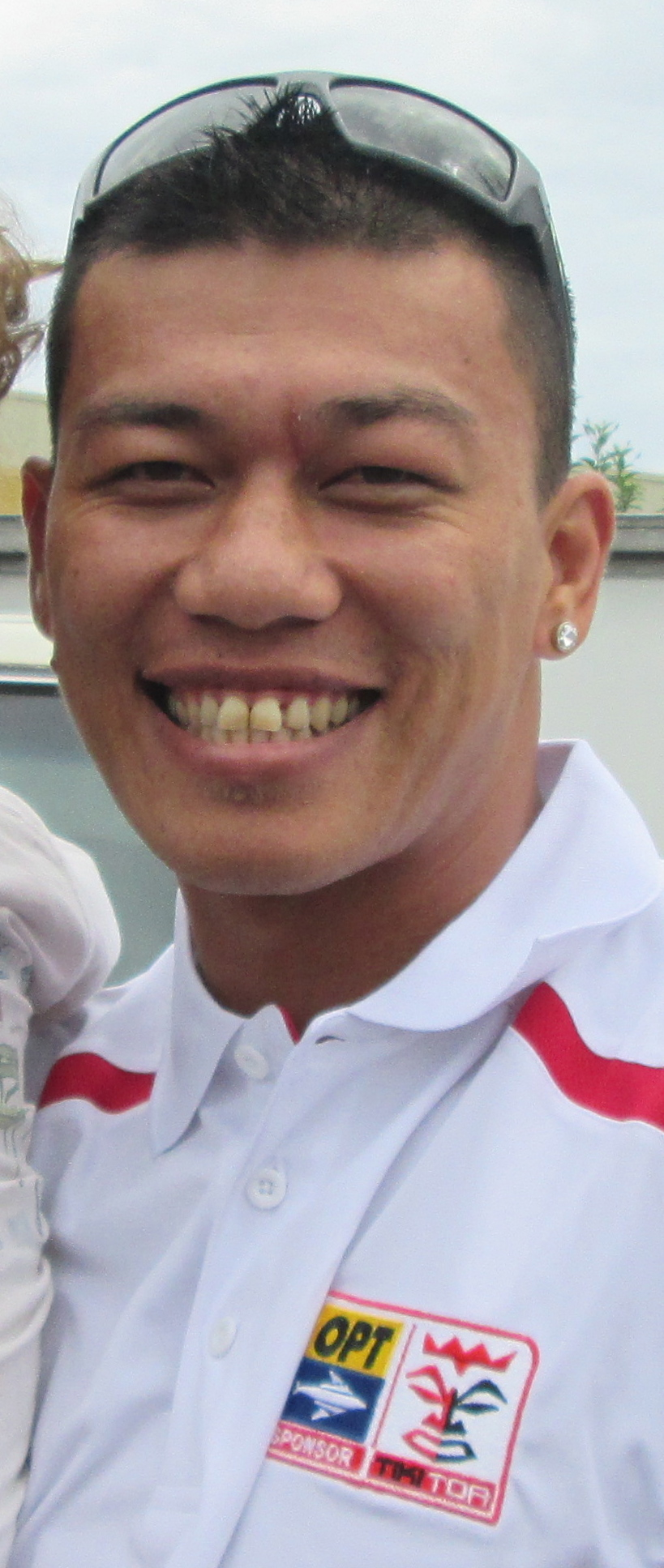
- Tchen in 2013

Personal information
- Full name: Vetea Angelo Tchen
- Date of birth: 8 March 1982 (age 44)
- Place of birth: Tahiti
- Height: 1.84 m (6 ft 0 in)
- Position: Left-back

Team information
- Current team: Tefana
- Number: 21

Senior career*
Years	Team	Apps	(Gls)
2000–	Tefana		

International career^{‡}
2001–2018	Tahiti	34	(1)
Medal record
Men's football
Representing Tahiti
OFC Nations Cup
Winner	2012 Solomon Islands
Third place	2002 New Zealand
Men's Beach soccer
Representing Tahiti
FIFA Beach Soccer World Cup
Runner-up	2015 Portugal
Runner-up	2017 Bahamas
OFC Beach Soccer Nations Cup
Winner	2019 Tahiti
Third place	2006 Tahiti
Third place	2009 Tahiti
- * Club domestic league appearances and goals as of 13 January 2012 ‡ National team caps and goals as of 23 March 2018

Vetea Angelo Tchen (born 8 March 1982) is a Tahitian footballer who plays as a defender. He currently plays for Tefana in the Tahiti Division Fédérale and the Tahiti national football team.

In October 2013, he was appointed a knight of the Order of Tahiti Nui.

== International goals ==
#	Date	Venue	Opponent	Score	Result	Competition
1	30 June 2003	National Stadium, Suva	Federated States of Micronesia	10-0	17-0	2003 South Pacific Games

== Honours ==
Tahiti

- OFC Nations Cup: 2012; 3rd place, 2002
- FIFA Beach Soccer World Cup: Runner-up, 2015, 2017
- OFC Beach Soccer Nations Cup: 2019; 3rd place, 2006, 2009
