= New Caledonia national beach soccer team =

New Caledonia
- Nickname(s): Les Cagous (The Kagus)
- Association: Fédération Calédonienne de Football
- Confederation: OFC (Oceania)
- Head coach: Felix Tagawa
- FIFA code: NCL
First colours
Second colours

OFC Beach Soccer Championship
- Appearances: 2 (first in 2013)
- Best result: Second place, 2013

The New Caledonia national beach soccer team represents New Caledonia in international beach soccer competitions and is controlled by the New Caledonian Football Federation, the governing body for football in New Caledonia.

== Achievements ==
- OFC Beach Soccer Championship Best: Runners-up
  - 2013

== Current squad ==
The following players were called to the squad for the 2019 OFC Beach Soccer Nations Cup from 17–23 June 2019.
Caps and goals updated as of 24 June 2019 after the game against Vanuatu.

No.	Pos.	Player	Date of birth (age)	Caps	Goals	Club
1	GK	Rocky Nyikeine	26 May 1992 (age 33)	0	0	(New Caledonia) Hienghène Sport
12	GK	Itra Hlemu	22 August 1998 (age 26)	0	0	(New Caledonia) Gaïtcha FCN
2		Georges Wakanumune	20 March 2001 (age 24)	0	0	(New Caledonia) Hienghène Sport
3		Jean-Jacques Katrawa	2 August 1999 (age 25)	0	0	(New Caledonia) Hienghène Sport
4		Jacky Wetewea	6 February 1997 (age 28)	0	0	(France) Cormontreuil FC
5		Jérémie Dokunengo	4 August 1989 (age 35)	0	0	(New Caledonia) Tiga Sport
6		Jacky Weinane	19 May 1995 (age 30)	0	0	(New Caledonia) Tiga Sport
7		Ivanoë Bamy	7 July 1992 (age 32)	0	0	(New Caledonia) Hienghène Sport
8		Jean-Pierre Ayawa	20 December 1989 (age 35)	0	0	(New Caledonia) Mont-Dore
9		Antoine Roine	16 May 1992 (age 33)	0	0	(New Caledonia) Hienghène Sport
10		Joseph Athale	11 July 1995 (age 29)	0	0	(New Caledonia) Hienghène Sport
11		Patrick Diaike	25 May 1980 (age 45)	0	0	(New Caledonia)

== Current squad ==
Correct as of August 2013.

Note: Flags indicate national team as defined under FIFA eligibility rules; some limited exceptions apply. Players may hold more than one non-FIFA nationality.

No.	Pos.	Nation	Player
2	DF		Loic Wakanumune
3	DF		Steevens Longue
4	DF		Ludovic Wakanumune
5	DF		Georges Wadenges
6	MF		Augustin Truijij
7	FW		Patrick Diaike

No.	Pos.	Nation	Player
8	MF		Olivier Dokunengo
9	FW		Ramon Djamali
10	MF		Kouriane Dokunengo
11	FW		Jean-Pierre Ayawa
12	GK		Benjamin Foawy
13	MF		Jean-Xavier Wakanumune

Coach: Felix Tagawa
