= René van Dieren =

Dutch footballer

Personal information
- Full name: René Theo van Dieren
- Date of birth: 12 March 1981 (age 45)
- Place of birth: Naarden, Netherlands
- Height: 1.80 m (5 ft 11 in)
- Position: Defensive midfielder

Youth career
- NVC Naarden
- Nunspeet
- Feyenoord

Senior career*
| Years | Team | Apps | (Gls) |
| 1998–2001 | Feyenoord | 5 | (0) |
| 2001–2002 | Fortuna Sittard | 23 | (2) |
| 2002–2009 | Excelsior | 182 | (3) |
| 2010 | AGOVV | 5 | (0) |
| 2010–2011 | Sparta | 15 | (0) |
| 2011–2014 | Lienden | 52 | (4) |
| Total | | 282 | (9) |

International career
| 1998-1999 | Netherlands U18 | 3 | (0) |
| 1999–2000 | Netherlands U19 | 11 | (0) |
- * Club domestic league appearances and goals

René Theo van Dieren (born 12 March 1981) is a Dutch retired footballer.

== Club career ==
His former clubs are Fortuna Sittard, Feyenoord, Excelsior, AGOVV Apeldoorn and Sparta Rotterdam. He finished his career at FC Lienden in the Dutch Topklasse.

== International career ==
He was a member of the Dutch squad at the 2001 FIFA World Youth Championship and the 2013 FIFA Beach Soccer World Cup. He played 11 games for the Netherlands national under-19 football team.

== Post-playing career ==
After retiring as a player, van Dieren has worked as a bartender, bricklayer and firefighter.
