= Patrick Ax =

Dutch footballer (born 1979)

Personal information
- Date of birth: 1 December 1979 (age 46)
- Place of birth: Groningen, Netherlands
- Height: 1.80 m (5 ft 11 in)
- Position: Winger

Senior career*
Years	Team	Apps	(Gls)
1996–1998	Groningen	7	(0)
1998–2000	Vitesse	1	(0)
1999–2000	→ De Graafschap (loan)	16	(5)
2000–2004	N.E.C.	105	(9)
2004–2006	De Graafschap	52	(9)
2006–2008	Go Ahead Eagles	57	(7)
2008–2010	Dijkse Boys		
2010–2015	TEC		
Total		238	(30)

International career
1994–1995	Netherlands U-16	6	(2)
2000–2001	Netherlands U-21	5	(1)
- Netherlands (Beach)

Managerial career
- 2024-: AGOVV
- * Club domestic league appearances and goals

Patrick Ax (born 1 December 1979) is a Dutch retired footballer. He has played for several clubs in his home country as well as winning caps for the Netherlands U-21 side.

He currently is youth coach at Vitesse.

== Playing career ==
=== Club ===
Ax began his career at hometown club FC Groningen, making his league debut against PSV Eindhoven on 25 August 1996. Although he made few appearances, he caught the eye of Vitesse Arnhem, who signed the left winger in 1998. Ax, however, only managed to make a single appearance in his first season, and was loaned to De Graafschap for the following season. Here he managed to score 5 goals in 16 appearances.

Following his loan move Ax returned to Vitesse, where he was sold to their rivals NEC Nijmegen. Here Ax enjoyed the most successful period of his career, playing four seasons and featuring regularly in the side. In the 2002–03 season Ax helped NEC to finish in fifth place in the league, resulting in UEFA Cup football the following season. NEC lost to Wisła Kraków in the first round of the 2003–04 UEFA Cup, with Ax making substitute appearances in both legs of the tie and receiving a red card in the second. Injuries, however, started to take the toll on the player, and Ax subsequently left NEC at the end of his contract in 2004.

Ax returned to De Graafschap in 2004 and spent two seasons with his former club. His first season saw De Graafschap finish in a disappointing 17th-place resulting in relegation to the Eerste Divisie. After playing one season in the second tier, Ax moved to fellow Eerste Divisie side Go Ahead Eagles. Ax spent two seasons at the Deventer-based team before announcing his retirement in 2008.

=== International ===
Ax was part of the same Netherlands under 21 side as future internationals Dirk Kuyt, Rafael van der Vaart and John Heitinga, but despite several appearances he did not make the step up to the full national team.

Ax took part in the 2002 UEFA European Under-21 Championship with the Netherlands. He had previously scored a goal in a qualifying match against the Republic of Ireland.

Ax has also played Beach soccer for the Netherlands, representing his country in 3 matches at the 2013 FIFA Beach Soccer World Cup in Tahiti.

=== Retirement ===
Ax retired from professional football at the relatively young age of 29. Ax played amateur football for Dijkse Boys. He helped the Helmond-based team to achieve promotion to the Topklasse for the 2010–11 season, the highest level of amateur football in the Netherlands. From 2010 through 2015, Ax played for TEC.

== Managerial career ==
After retiring as a player, Ax became a youth coach at Vitesse. He took charge as head coach of AGOVV in September 2024.
