= 2019 FIFA Beach Soccer World Cup =

Copa Mundial de Fútbol Playa de la FIFA Paraguay 2019

Tournament details
- Host country: Paraguay
- Dates: 21 November – 1 December
- Teams: 16 (from 6 confederations)
- Venue: 1 (in 1 host city)

Final positions
- Champions: Portugal (2nd title)
- Runners-up: Italy
- Third place: Russia
- Fourth place: Japan

Tournament statistics
- Matches played: 32
- Goals scored: 286 (8.94 per match)
- Attendance: 34,997 (1,094 per match)
- Top scorer: (Italy) Gabriele Gori (16 goals)
- Best player: (Japan) Ozu Moreira
- Best goalkeeper: (Portugal) Elinton Andrade
- Fair play award: Senegal

The 2019 FIFA Beach Soccer World Cup was the 10th FIFA Beach Soccer World Cup, the premier international beach soccer championship contested by men's national teams of the member associations of FIFA. Overall, this was the 20th edition of a world cup in beach soccer since the establishment of the Beach Soccer World Championships which ran from 1995 to 2004 but was not governed by FIFA. This was the fifth tournament to take place under the biennial basis; the World Cup now takes place once every two years, having taken place annually until 2009.

The tournament was confirmed publicly on 3 November 2017, during the annual FIFA Beach Soccer Workshop in Dubai as part of the recently renewed partnership between FIFA and Beach Soccer Worldwide (BSWW). In October 2018, it was announced that the tournament would take place in Paraguay in the city of Luque, near the capital, Asunción, between 21 November and 1 December 2019. Fifteen teams advanced through preliminary continental qualification competitions, which started in September 2018 and ended in July 2019, to join the hosts in the final tournament which included Belarus as the sole team making their debut at the finals and notably saw the third placed team of the previous edition, Iran, fail to qualify. This was the first FIFA tournament to be hosted by Paraguay, the first edition of the World Cup held in South America since 2007, and the first time a landlocked country hosted beach soccer's principal event.

Following two narrow loses, hosts Paraguay were eliminated at the group stage. Brazil were the defending champions, but were defeated at the quarter-finals stage by Russia in what was a repeat of the scenario of 2015, thereby condemning Brazil to their joint-worst ever result. Portugal won the tournament, besting Italy in the final to claim their second FIFA World Cup crown (following 2015) and third world title overall (including the 2001 World Championships); Italy collected a second runners-up medal, following 2008. For the first time, the podium teams were all European nations. Japan finished fourth, matching their best ever placing previously achieved in 2005. A joint-record tally of 286 goals were scored (with 2006).

Madjer of Portugal made his last international beach soccer tournament appearance at this competition. The all-time top scorer of the competition, often heralded as the best player of all time, announced his retirement following the final, aged 42.

== Host selection ==
The bidding schedule to determine the hosts was as follows:

- 14 June 2018 – FIFA opens bidding process.
- 29 June 2018 – Deadline for national associations to declare interest of hosting to FIFA.
- 6 July 2018 – FIFA send documents detailing the application campaign and conditions of participation for associations to analyse.
- 27 July 2018 – Deadline for associations to agree to terms of documents and submit an official bid.
- 14 September 2018 – Deadline for nations to prepare and submit their complete bidding packages to be evaluated by FIFA.
- 26 October 2018 – Hosts announced by FIFA.

Countries known to have declared interest in bidding to host the competition are inclusive of but not exclusive to:

- Paraguay
- Australia
- Barbados

On 1 October 2018, the FIFA Organising Committee recommended hosting be awarded to Paraguay as they were the only association to make an official bid after the initial declaration of interest stage. Confirmation of the awarding of hosting rights to Paraguay was announced at the FIFA Council meeting in Kigali, Rwanda on 26 October 2018.

== Qualification ==
A total of 16 teams qualified for the final tournament. In addition to Paraguay who qualified automatically as hosts, 15 other teams qualified from six separate continental competitions.

The slot allocation for each confederation was decided at the FIFA Council meeting on 26 October 2018.

=== Qualifying rounds ===
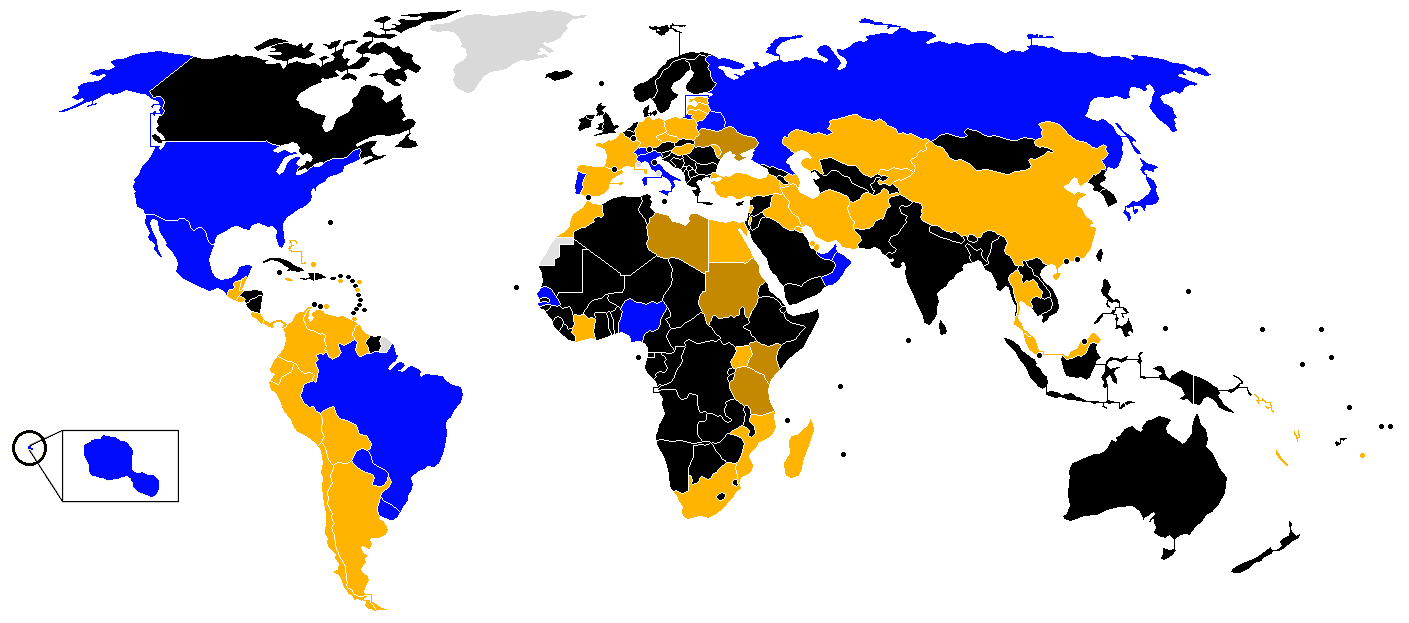
Qualified for World Cup finals Entered qualifying rounds but failed to qualify for World Cup finals Initially entered qualifying rounds but withdrew Did not enter the World Cup Not an associate member of FIFA

The process of qualification to the World Cup finals began on 9 September 2018 and ended on 27 July 2019.

- AFC (3 slots): The qualifiers for Asian nations took place in Pattaya, Thailand between 7–17 March 2019.
- CAF (2 slots): The qualifiers for African nations took place in Sharm El Sheikh, Egypt between 8–14 December 2018; its preliminary qualifying round took place between 9–22 September 2018.
- CONCACAF (2 slots): The qualifiers for North American nations took place in Puerto Vallarta, Mexico between 13 and 19 May 2019.
- CONMEBOL (2 slots + hosts): The qualifiers for South American nations took place in Rio de Janeiro, Brazil between 28 April – 5 May 2019.
- OFC (1 slot): The qualifiers for Oceanian nations took place in Papeete, Tahiti between 17 and 22 June 2019.
- UEFA (5 slots): The qualifiers for European nations took place in Moscow, Russia between 19 and 27 July 2019.

=== Qualified teams ===
Note: All appearance statistics below include only the FIFA era (since 2005); see: National team appearances in the FIFA Beach Soccer World Cup for inclusion of the pre-FIFA era (1995–2004) stats.

Confederation	Qualifying tournament	Team	App	Last	Best performance
AFC (Asia)	2019 AFC Beach Soccer Championship	Japan	10th	2017	Fourth place (2005)
AFC (Asia)	2019 AFC Beach Soccer Championship	Oman	3rd	2015	Group stage (2011, 2015)
AFC (Asia)	2019 AFC Beach Soccer Championship	United Arab Emirates	6th	2017	Group stage (2007, 2008, 2009, 2013, 2017)
CAF (Africa)	2018 Africa Beach Soccer Cup of Nations	Nigeria	6th	2017	Quarter-finals (2007, 2011)
CAF (Africa)	2018 Africa Beach Soccer Cup of Nations	Senegal	7th	2017	Quarter-finals (2007, 2011, 2017)
CONCACAF (Central, North America and Caribbean)	2019 CONCACAF Beach Soccer Championship	Mexico	6th	2017	Runners-up (2007)
CONCACAF (Central, North America and Caribbean)	2019 CONCACAF Beach Soccer Championship	United States	5th	2013	Group stage (2005, 2006, 2007, 2013)
CONMEBOL (South America)	Host nation	Paraguay	4th	2017	Quarter-finals (2017)
CONMEBOL (South America)	2019 FIFA Beach Soccer World Cup qualification (CONMEBOL)	Brazil	10th	2017	Champions (2006, 2007, 2008, 2009, 2017)
CONMEBOL (South America)	2019 FIFA Beach Soccer World Cup qualification (CONMEBOL)	Uruguay	6th	2009	Runners-up (2006)
OFC (Oceania)	2019 OFC Beach Soccer Nations Cup	Tahiti	5th	2017	Runners-up (2015, 2017)
UEFA (Europe)	2019 FIFA Beach Soccer World Cup qualification (UEFA)	Belarus	1st	n/a	Debut
UEFA (Europe)	2019 FIFA Beach Soccer World Cup qualification (UEFA)	Italy	8th	2017	Runners-up (2008)
UEFA (Europe)	2019 FIFA Beach Soccer World Cup qualification (UEFA)	Russia	7th	2015	Champions (2011, 2013)
UEFA (Europe)	2019 FIFA Beach Soccer World Cup qualification (UEFA)	Switzerland	5th	2017	Runners-up (2009)
UEFA (Europe)	2019 FIFA Beach Soccer World Cup qualification (UEFA)	Portugal	9th	2017	Champions (2015)

== Venue ==
One venue was used in the city of Luque, part of the Greater Asunción area, on the grounds of the Paraguayan Olympic Committee headquarters.

The stadium was purpose-built for the tournament, having been constructed between January and August 2019. It was officially opened by FIFA president Gianni Infantino on 9 November 2019, under the nickname of the Paraguay national team, Los Pynandi, meaning "barefoot" in Guarani. The Paraguayan Football Association (APF) and FIFA funded the US$1.5 million cost of the concrete structure. The main arena was complemented by three external, floodlit training pitches located adjacent.

Luque (Asunción area)	Location of the host city of the 2019 FIFA Beach Soccer World Cup.
Los Pynandi Stadium	Location of the host city of the 2019 FIFA Beach Soccer World Cup.
25°15′23.7″S 57°31′54.11″W	Location of the host city of the 2019 FIFA Beach Soccer World Cup.
Capacity: 2,820	Location of the host city of the 2019 FIFA Beach Soccer World Cup.

== Organisation ==
The following were key milestones in the organisation of the tournament (not belonging of other sections):

The official poster of the World Cup

- A budget of US$8 million for the tournament was approved at the FIFA Council meeting in Bogotá, Colombia on 16 March 2018. In March 2021, the final cost was reported under-budget at US$6.1 million.
- FIFA delegates visited the proposed World Cup complex, meeting with members of the Paraguayan Football Association (APF) for the first time on 15 November 2018.
- The dates of the competition were confirmed at the FIFA Council meeting in Miami, United States on 15 March 2019.
- The Local Organising Committee (LOC) and FIFA officials held their first meeting together, the latter also conducting a second inspection of the venue, on 16 July 2019.
- The official emblem and official match ball, the former a design inspired by Ñandutí, a traditional form of Paraguayan embroidered lace, was unveiled at the CONMEBOL Convention Centre in Asunción, on 18 July 2019.
- The "coordination" meeting, attended by the LOC, FIFA delegates and representatives of the sixteen participating teams, was held at the Bourbon Asunción Convention Hotel on 13 September 2019.
- Press accreditation ran during October 2019 with the deadline to register for approval through the FIFA Media Channel, 31 October.
- Tickets were made available online to the public on 25 October 2019.
- Tigo Paraguay, Visión Banco and Cerveza Pilsen were announced as National Supporters of the tournament on 14, 19 and 20 November 2019 respectively.
- The official promotional poster, designed to be "thought-provoking" and instantly command attention, based upon Guaraní culture features of feathers and native Paraguayan patterns of triangles and diamonds, was unveiled on 19 November 2019. Local marketing of the tournament, including only publishing the poster 48 hours before the tournament began, received criticism.

== Match officials ==
FIFA chose 24 officials from 24 different countries to referee matches at the World Cup, who were revealed on 29 October 2019. At least one referee was representing each of the six confederations: four from the AFC, three from CAF, five from CONMEBOL, three from CONCACAF, one from the OFC and eight from UEFA.

The most matches any one referee officiated in was seven (Domínguez, Ostrowski, Benchabane, González, Ángeles, Namazov, Mammadov); however it was Ivo Moraes who officiated the most matches as lead referee (three), including the final. Only Hugo Pado and Sergio Soares were not appointed as first referee of any match, the latter also officiating in the fewest total matches (one).

Confederation	Referee	Age	Qualified
AFC	(United Arab Emirates) Ebrahim Al-Mansory (Note: Oldest referee)	46	2009
AFC	(Malaysia) Suhaimi Mat Hassan	43	2010
AFC	(Uzbekistan) Bakhtiyor Namazov	45	2009
AFC	(China) Shao Liang	40	2013
CAF	(Egypt) Hany Farouk	32	2015
CAF	(Madagascar) Said Hachim	40	2010
CAF	(Morocco) Adil Ouchker	36	2013
CONCACAF	(Dominican Republic) Juan Ángeles	40	2012
CONCACAF	(Panama) Gumercindo Batista	39	2012
CONCACAF	(El Salvador) Gonzalo Carballo	37	2014
CONMEBOL	(Paraguay) Gustavo Domínguez	41	2012
CONMEBOL	(Uruguay) Aecio Fernández (Note: Referee shortest qualified)	36	2018
CONMEBOL	(Brazil) Ivo Moraes (Note: Referee longest qualified)	42	2005
CONMEBOL	(Argentina) Mariano Romo	38	2013
CONMEBOL	(Peru) Alex Valdiviezo	40	2012

Confederation	Referee	Age	Qualified
OFC	(Solomon Islands) Hugo Pado	39	2010
UEFA
UEFA	(France) Sofien Benchabane	35	2011
UEFA	(Russia) Roman Borisov	38	2014
UEFA	(Portugal) Sergio Gomes Soares	40	2014
UEFA	(Lithuania) Vitalij Gomolko (Note: Youngest referee)	30	2015
UEFA	(Spain) Raúl González	31	2016
UEFA	(Azerbaijan) Ingilab Mammadov	36	2012
UEFA	(Italy) Gionni Matticoli	44	2012
UEFA	(Poland) Łukasz Ostrowski	33	2012

== Draw ==
The draw to split the 16 teams into four groups of four took place on 13 September 2019 at 19:30 PYT (UTC−4), at the CONMEBOL Convention Centre in Asunción, Paraguay. The draw was assisted by Roberto Acuna of Paraguay and Júnior of Brazil who both formerly represented their respective national teams at World Cups in both association football and beach soccer. CONMEBOL president, Alejandro Domínguez and Paraguayan Football Association (APF) president, Robert Harrison, also took part in the presentation.

For the purpose of the draw, the teams were divided into four pots each containing four teams. The teams were allocated into the respective pots based on their previous performances at recent World Cups, and their respective qualification tournaments. Initially, two teams from Pot 1 were automatically allocated to the groups – Paraguay, as the hosts, were assigned to position A1 and Brazil, as the defending champions, were assigned to position D1. Teams from the same confederation could not be drawn into the same group, except for UEFA for which one group was permitted to contain two, since UEFA are represented by five teams.

Pot 1	Pot 2	Pot 3	Pot 4
Paraguay (Hosts; assigned to A1); Brazil (Holders; assigned to D1); Russia; Tahiti	Italy; Portugal; Japan; Senegal	Switzerland; Mexico; Nigeria; United Arab Emirates	Oman; United States; Uruguay; Belarus

== Squads ==
Each team had to name a preliminary squad of between 12 and 18 players. From the preliminary squad, the team had to name a final squad of 12 players (two of whom must be goalkeepers) by the FIFA deadline. Players in the final squad could be replaced by a player from the preliminary squad due to serious injury or illness up to 24 hours prior to kickoff of the team's first match.

The squads included a number of high-profile players who, at this tournament, made their final international beach soccer appearances, announcing their retirements following the conclusion of the competition. This included Portuguese captain and three-time world champion Madjer (1998 debut, 583 caps), 2009 runners-up, Swiss captain Moritz "Mo" Jaeggy (2003 debut, 355 caps) and his brother, Valentin Jaeggy (2005 debut, 321 caps).

== Group stage ==
Each team earned three points for a win in regulation time, two points for a win in extra time, one point for a win in a penalty shoot-out, and no points for a defeat. The top two teams of each group advanced to the quarter-finals.

All times are local, PYST (UTC−3).

=== Tiebreakers ===
The ranking of teams in the group stage was determined as follows:

1. Points obtained in all group matches;
2. Goal difference in all group matches;
3. Number of goals scored in all group matches;
4. Points obtained in the matches played between the teams in question;
5. Goal difference in the matches played between the teams in question;
6. Number of goals scored in the matches played between the teams in question;
7. Fair play points in all group matches (only one deduction could be applied to a player in a single match):
  - Yellow card: −1 points;
  - Indirect red card (second yellow card): −3 points;
  - Direct red card: −4 points;
  - Yellow card and direct red card: −5 points;
8. Drawing of lots.

=== Group A ===
Pos	Team	Pld	W	W+	WP	L	GF	GA	GD	Pts	Qualification
1	Japan	3	3	0	0	0	14	10	+4	9	Knockout stage
2	Switzerland	3	1	1	0	1	18	17	+1	5	Knockout stage
3	Paraguay (H)	3	1	0	0	2	15	13	+2	3	
4	United States	3	0	0	0	3	10	17	−7	0	

Source: FIFA
Rules for classification: Group stage tiebreakers
(H) Host
21 November 2019
17:50

Switzerland	8–6	United States
Stankovic 1', 14'; Hodel 6'; Ott 10', 32', 33'; Mounoud 21'; Borer 27'	Report	Leopoldo 2' (pen.); Perera 15', 32'; Reyes 27', 27' (pen.); Santos 30'

Los Pynandi Stadium, Luque
Attendance: 578
Referee: Aecio Fernández (Uruguay)
21 November 2019
21:00

Paraguay	4–5	Japan
Carballo 22', 34'; Morán 28'; Barreto 32'	Report	Okuyama 13'; Ozu 16', 27'; Akaguma 24', 36'

Los Pynandi Stadium, Luque
Attendance: 2,483
Referee: Raúl González (Spain)

23 November 2019
17:50

United States	3–4	Japan
Canale 9', 33'; Toth 20'	Report	Ozu 9', 33'; Matsuo 13'; Tabata 30'

Los Pynandi Stadium, Luque
Attendance: 642
Referee: Sofien Benchabane (France)
23 November 2019
21:00

Paraguay	6–7 (a.e.t.)	Switzerland
Y. Rolón 8'; J. Rolón 28', 29' (pen.), 38'; Ojeda 32'; Morán 34'	Report	Ostgen 2'; Ott 12'; Hodel 19'; Stankovic 22', 37', 39' (pen.); M. Jaeggy 32'

Los Pynandi Stadium, Luque
Attendance: 2,847
Referee: Suhaimi Mat Hassan (Malaysia)

25 November 2019
17:50

Japan	5–3	Switzerland
Akaguma 2', 8'; Oba 21'; Ozu 21'; Komaki 29'	Report	Ott 10'; Stankovic 33' (pen.), 35'

Los Pynandi Stadium, Luque
Attendance: 361
Referee: Alex Valdiviezo (Peru)
25 November 2019
21:00

United States	1–5	Paraguay
Leopoldo 30'	Report	Morán 9'; J. Rolón 11'; Barreto 23'; Carballo 24' (pen.); Ovelar 30'

Los Pynandi Stadium, Luque
Attendance: 2,847
Referee: Ingilab Mammadov (Azerbaijan)

=== Group B ===
Pos	Team	Pld	W	W+	WP	L	GF	GA	GD	Pts	Qualification
1	Italy	3	2	0	0	1	21	10	+11	6	Knockout stage
2	Uruguay	3	2	0	0	1	9	9	0	6	Knockout stage
3	Tahiti	3	2	0	0	1	16	17	−1	6	
4	Mexico	3	0	0	0	3	3	13	−10	0	

Source: FIFA
Rules for classification: Group stage tiebreakers
21 November 2019
16:15

Italy	12–4	Tahiti
Gori 2', 6', 13', 32' (pen.), 36'; Corosiniti 9', 10'; Zurlo 18', 18', 29', 33'; Montani 30'	Report	Teriitau 4'; Chan-Kat 12'; Li Fung Kuee 13', 26'

Los Pynandi Stadium, Luque
Attendance: 537
Referee: Ivo Moraes (Brazil)
21 November 2019
19:25

Uruguay	1–0	Mexico
Laduche 36'	Report

Los Pynandi Stadium, Luque
Attendance: 997
Referee: Bakhtiyor Namazov (Uzbekistan)

23 November 2019
16:15

Tahiti	6–1	Mexico
Chan-Kat 12', 22'; Teriitau 21' (pen.); Labaste 27'; Taiarui 29'; Tepa 35'	Report	Vizcarra 25'

Los Pynandi Stadium, Luque
Attendance: 326
Referee: Łukasz Ostrowski (Poland)
23 November 2019
19:25

Uruguay	4–3	Italy
Laens 7'; Costa 17'; Laduche 20'; Miranda 27'	Report	Gori 4', 7', 36'

Los Pynandi Stadium, Luque
Attendance: 1,069
Referee: Hany Farouk (Egypt)

25 November 2019
16:15

Mexico	2–6	Italy
Sámano 26'; Maldonado 29'	Report	Gori 3', 9', 13', 14', 22'; Zurlo 23'

Los Pynandi Stadium, Luque
Attendance: 216
Referee: Said Hachim (Madagascar)
25 November 2019
19:25

Tahiti	6–4	Uruguay
Teriitau 3'; Tepa 10', 30'; Tehau 14'; Labaste 22'; Taiarui 26'	Report	Bella 5', 34'; Laduche 27'; Capurro 30'

Los Pynandi Stadium, Luque
Attendance: 1,318
Referee: Gonzalo Carballo (El Salvador)

=== Group C ===
Pos	Team	Pld	W	W+	WP	L	GF	GA	GD	Pts	Qualification
1	Senegal	3	2	0	0	1	17	11	+6	6	Knockout stage
2	Russia	3	2	0	0	1	14	14	0	6	Knockout stage
3	Belarus	3	1	0	0	2	10	13	−3	3	
4	United Arab Emirates	3	1	0	0	2	6	9	−3	3	

Source: FIFA
Rules for classification: Group stage tiebreakers
22 November 2019
16:15

Senegal	7–8	Russia
Diassy 5', 17'; Fall 15', 33'; Mendy 26'; Diagne 29', 34' (pen.)	Report	Thioune 1' (o.g.); Nikonorov 4', 34'; Zemskov 8', 31', 32'; Paporotnyi 23', 34'

Los Pynandi Stadium, Luque
Attendance: 277
Referee: Gustavo Domínguez (Paraguay)
22 November 2019
19:25

Belarus	5–1	United Arab Emirates
Savich 4'; Makarevich 19'; Samsonov 29'; Bryshtsel 31', 32'	Report	A. Beshr 26'

Los Pynandi Stadium, Luque
Attendance: 538
Referee: Adil Ouchker (Morocco)

24 November 2019
16:15

Russia	1–4	United Arab Emirates
Paporotnyi 19'	Report	Al-Jasmi 2'; A. Mohammad 23'; Muntaser 32' (pen.); W. Beshr 33'

Los Pynandi Stadium, Luque
Attendance: 368
Referee: Mariano Romo (Argentina)
24 November 2019
19:25

Belarus	2–7	Senegal
Hapon 15'; Bryshtsel 30'	Report	Mendy 6', 25'; Diatta 7'; Diagne 27', 29', 29', 32'

Los Pynandi Stadium, Luque
Attendance: 736
Referee: Ivo Moraes (Brazil)

26 November 2019
16:15

United Arab Emirates	1–3	Senegal
Karim 32'	Report	Sylla 27'; Diatta 28'; Mendy 30'

Los Pynandi Stadium, Luque
Attendance: 308
Referee: Raúl González (Spain)
26 November 2019
19:25

Russia	5–3	Belarus
Nikonorov 6', 16', 34'; Zemskov 14'; Shishin 36'	Report	Hapon 5'; Bryshtsel 7'; Kanstantsinau 10'

Los Pynandi Stadium, Luque
Attendance: 1,163
Referee: Gionni Matticoli (Italy)

=== Group D ===
Pos	Team	Pld	W	W+	WP	L	GF	GA	GD	Pts	Qualification
1	Brazil	3	3	0	0	0	29	11	+18	9	Knockout stage
2	Portugal	3	2	0	0	1	20	11	+9	6	Knockout stage
3	Oman	3	1	0	0	2	9	16	−7	3	
4	Nigeria	3	0	0	0	3	8	28	−20	0	

Source: FIFA
Rules for classification: Group stage tiebreakers
22 November 2019
17:50

Portugal	10–1	Nigeria
Belchior 13', 25'; Jordan 14'; Torres 15', 32' (pen.), 33'; Coimbra 24', 34'; L. Martins 24'; Madjer 36'	Report	Abu 12'

Los Pynandi Stadium, Luque
Attendance: 302
Referee: Gumercindo Batista (Panama)
22 November 2019
21:00

Brazil	8–2	Oman
Bokinha 4' (pen.), 11'; Mauricinho 6', 19', 29'; Filipe 12', 32'; Catarino 35'	Report	Al-Zadjali 8'; Sa. Al-Bulushi 33'

Los Pynandi Stadium, Luque
Attendance: 928
Referee: Vitalij Gomolko (Lithuania)

24 November 2019
17:50

Nigeria	5–6	Oman
Ogbonna 11', 15', 26'; Taiwo 27'; Igudia 31'	Report	Al-Farsi 5', 20'; Al-Sinani 8'; Mu. Al-Araimi 20'; Sa. Al-Bulushi 24'; Al-Oraimi 28'

Los Pynandi Stadium, Luque
Attendance: 445
Referee: Roman Borisov (Russia)
24 November 2019
21:00

Brazil	9–7	Portugal
Mauricinho 1'; Xavier 13'; Catarino 13'; Bokinha 17', 18'; Coimbra 19' (o.g.); Rodrigo 20'; Filipe 30' (pen.); Datinha 36'	Report	Jordan 9', 28'; Coimbra 12', 28'; L. Martins 16', 22'; Belchior 23' (pen.)

Los Pynandi Stadium, Luque
Attendance: 1,521
Referee: Shao Liang (China)

26 November 2019
17:50

Oman	1–3	Portugal
Al-Sinani 9'	Report	Coimbra 5'; B. Martins 21'; L. Martins 28'

Los Pynandi Stadium, Luque
Attendance: 537
Referee: Adil Ouchker (Morocco)
26 November 2019
21:00

Nigeria	2–12	Brazil
Ekujumi 9'; Abu 17'	Report	Mauricinho 4'; Lucão 6', 19'; Rodrigo 16', 25', 27'; Rafinha 29'; Bokinha 29' (pen.), 35'; Xavier 32'; Catarino 33'; Filipe 34'

Los Pynandi Stadium, Luque
Attendance: 1,719
Referee: Gustavo Domínguez (Paraguay)

== Knockout stage ==
=== Bracket ===
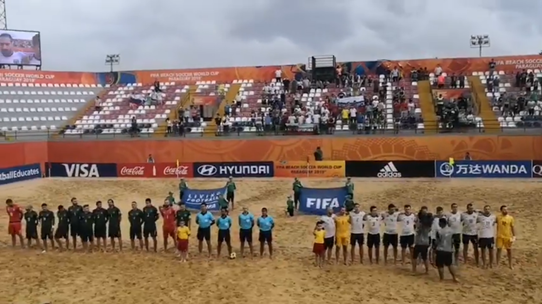
Italy v Russia – pre-match scene of the teams lining up for the national anthems before the semi-final.

Source: FIFA

Quarter-finals
28 November – Luque
Italy	5
Switzerland	4
28 November – Luque
Brazil	3
Russia	4
28 November – Luque
Japan	3
Uruguay	2
28 November – Luque
Senegal	2
Portugal	4

Semi-finals
30 November – Luque
Italy (a.e.t.)	8
Russia	7
30 November – Luque
Japan	3 (1)
Portugal (p)	3 (2)

Final
1 December – Luque
Italy	4
Portugal	6
Third place match
1 December – Luque
Russia	5
Japan	4

=== Quarter-finals ===
28 November 2019
16:15

Brazil	3–4	Russia
Rodrigo 1', 13'; Mão 5'	Report	Zemskov 2'; Shishin 20'; Romanov 24', 31'

Los Pynandi Stadium, Luque
Attendance: 1,401
Referee: Said Hachim (Madagascar)

28 November 2019
17:50

Senegal	2–4	Portugal
Sylla 3'; Mendy 36'	Report	Jordan 8'; Diassy 20' (o.g.); L. Martins 22'; B. Martins 32'

Los Pynandi Stadium, Luque
Attendance: 1,193
Referee: Gonzalo Carballo (El Salvador)

28 November 2019
19:25

Italy	5–4	Switzerland
Gentilin 8'; Zurlo 24', 31', 36'; Ramacciotti 25'	Report	Ott 5', 10'; M. Jaeggy 20'; Borer 31'

Los Pynandi Stadium, Luque
Attendance: 1,396
Referee: Mariano Romo (Argentina)

28 November 2019
21:00

Japan	3–2	Uruguay
Oba 8'; Okuyama 11'; Tabata 16'	Report	Laduche 20' (pen.); Capurro 36'

Los Pynandi Stadium, Luque
Attendance: 1,072
Referee: Sofien Benchabane (France)

=== Semi-finals ===
Heavy rain and strong winds threatened the postponement of the semi-finals and deterred fans from attending the matches.

30 November 2019
16:15

Italy	8–7 (a.e.t.)	Russia
Corosiniti 9'; Ramacciotti 10', 15', 27'; Gori 25', 25', 31'; Zurlo 37' (pen.)	Report	Novikov 4'; Makarov 14', 35'; Zemskov 22', 24'; Romanov 25', 31'

Los Pynandi Stadium, Luque
Attendance: 579
Referee: Ebrahim Al-Mansory (United Arab Emirates)

30 November 2019
18:00

Japan	3–3 (a.e.t.)	Portugal
Ozu 11'; Yamauchi 13'; Akaguma 36'	Report	L. Martins 2'; B. Martins 29', 31'
Penalties
Ozu (penalty missed); Yamauchi (penalty scored); Tabata (penalty missed)	1–2	(penalty scored) Madjer; (penalty scored) Coimbra

Los Pynandi Stadium, Luque
Attendance: 707
Referee: Łukasz Ostrowski (Poland)

=== Third place match ===
1 December 2019
16:15

Russia	5–4	Japan
Zemskov 8', 23', 29'; Novikov 8'; Makarov 26'	Report	Akaguma 4', 8'; Ozu 12'; Oba 23'

Los Pynandi Stadium, Luque
Attendance: 2,739
Referee: Juan Angeles (Dominican Republic)

=== Final ===
1 December 2019
18:00

Italy	4–6	Portugal
Zurlo 6'; Ramacciotti 31', 36'; Gentilin 31'	Report	L. Martins 8', 28'; Jordan 18', 26', 35'; Lourenço 18'

Los Pynandi Stadium, Luque
Attendance: 2,847
Referee: Ivo Moraes (Brazil)

== Awards ==
After the final, FIFA presented individual awards to the three best players of the tournament, three top goalscorers, and to the best goalkeeper. In addition, a collective award was given to the team with the most points in the Fair Play ranking. Following this, the winners' trophy was awarded to Portugal.

=== Winners ===
2019 FIFA Beach Soccer World Cup
Champions

Portugal
2nd title
3rd world title

=== Individual awards ===
Along with the eventual winners of the gold, silver and bronze ball awards, Takuya Akaguma (Japan), Rui Coimbra (Portugal), Gabriele Gori (Italy), Boris Nikonorov (Russia), Artur Paporotnyi (Russia), Fedor Zemskov (Russia) and Emmanuele Zurlo (Italy) were also announced as the candidates for the award in the initial ten-man shortlist.

The individual awards were all sponsored by Adidas, except for the FIFA Fair Play Award.

The goal of the tournament was decided via an online public vote from which there were ten options to choose from. The vote closed at 14:00 GMT on 9 December.

Golden Ball	Silver Ball	Bronze Ball
(Japan) Ozu Moreira	(Portugal) Jordan Santos	(Portugal) Bê Martins
Golden Scorer	Silver Scorer	Bronze Scorer
(Italy) Gabriele Gori (16 goals, 0 assists)	(Italy) Emmanuele Zurlo (10 goals, 1 assist)	(Russia) Fedor Zemskov (10 goals, 0 assists)
Golden Glove
(Portugal) Elinton Andrade
FIFA Fair Play Award
Senegal
Goal of the tournament
(Italy) Emmanuele Zurlo; goal 1 vs. Switzerland

== Statistics ==
=== Goalscorers ===
With 16 goals, Italian forward Gabriele Gori finished as top scorer for the second consecutive tournament, a feat achieved only once previously during the FIFA era of World Cups, by Madjer in 2005 and 2006. Having failed to score at the last edition, Madjer scored one goal at this edition (what would be his last ever at a World Cup following his subsequent retirement) to extend his record tally of goals at FIFA World Cups to 88 (and 140 at all global championships).

There were 286 goals scored in 32 matches, for an average of 8.94 goals per match.

104 different players scored goals at this year's World Cup.

16 goals

- (Italy) Gabriele Gori

10 goals

- (Italy) Emmanuele Zurlo
- (Russia) Fedor Zemskov

8 goals

- (Portugal) Léo Martins

7 goals

- (Japan) Takuya Akaguma
- (Japan) Ozu Moreira
- (Portugal) Jordan Santos
- (Switzerland) Noël Ott
- (Switzerland) Dejan Stankovic

6 goals

- (Brazil) Bokinha
- (Brazil) Rodrigo
- (Italy) Dario Ramacciotti
- (Senegal) Mamour Diagne

5 goals

- (Brazil) Mauricinho
- (Portugal) Rui Coimbra
- (Russia) Boris Nikonorov
- (Senegal) Raoul Mendy

4 goals

- (Belarus) Ihar Bryshtsel
- (Brazil) Filipe
- (Paraguay) Jesús Rolón
- (Portugal) Bê Martins
- (Russia) Kirill Romanov
- (Uruguay) Gastón Laduche

3 goals

- (Brazil) Diogo Catarino
- (Italy) Francesco Corosiniti
- (Japan) Takaaki Oba
- (Nigeria) Emeka Ogbonna
- (Paraguay) Carlos Carballo
- (Paraguay) Pedro Morán
- (Portugal) Belchior
- (Portugal) Bruno Torres
- (Russia) Aleksey Makarov
- (Russia) Artur Paporotnyi
- (French Polynesia) Gervais Chan-Kat
- (French Polynesia) Patrick Tepa
- (French Polynesia) Ariihau Teriitau

2 goals

- (Belarus) Aleh Hapon
- (Brazil) Lucão
- (Brazil) Bruno Xavier
- (Italy) Josep Junior Gentilin
- (Japan) Masanori Okuyama
- (Japan) Teruki Tabata
- (Nigeria) Azeez Abu
- (Oman) Sami Al-Bulushi
- (Oman) Eid Al-Farsi
- (Oman) Jalal Al-Sinani
- (Paraguay) Édgar Barreto
- (Russia) Andrei Novikov
- (Russia) Dmitry Shishin
- (Senegal) Lansana Diassy
- (Senegal) Ninou Diatta
- (Senegal) Babacar Fall
- (Senegal) Mamadou Sylla
- (Switzerland) Philipp Borer
- (Switzerland) Glenn Hodel
- (Switzerland) Mo Jaeggy
- (French Polynesia) Tearii Labaste
- (French Polynesia) Raimana Li Fung Kuee
- (French Polynesia) Heimanu Taiarui
- (United States) Alessandro Canale
- (United States) Jason Leopoldo
- (United States) Nick Perera
- (United States) Oscar Reyes
- (Uruguay) Nicolás Bella
- (Uruguay) Marcelo Capurro

1 goal

- (Belarus) Ivan Kanstantsinau
- (Belarus) Valery Makarevich
- (Belarus) Dzianis Samsonov
- (Belarus) Illia Savich
- (Brazil) Datinha
- (Brazil) Mão
- (Brazil) Rafinha
- (Italy) Marcello Percia Montani
- (Japan) Masayuki Komaki
- (Japan) Naoya Matsuo
- (Japan) Shusei Yamauchi
- (Mexico) Ramón Maldonado
- (Mexico) Érick Sámano
- (Mexico) José Vizcarra
- (Nigeria) Egan-Osi Ekujumi
- (Nigeria) Godspower Igudia
- (Nigeria) Adams Taiwo
- (Oman) Mushel Al-Araimi
- (Oman) Khalid Al-Oraimi
- (Oman) Nooh Al-Zadjali
- (Paraguay) Luis Ojeda
- (Paraguay) Carlos Ovelar
- (Paraguay) Yoao Rolón
- (Portugal) André Lourenço
- (Portugal) Madjer
- (Switzerland) Eliott Mounoud
- (Switzerland) Jan Ostgen
- (French Polynesia) Alvin Tehau
- (United Arab Emirates) Mohamed Al-Jasmi
- (United Arab Emirates) Ahmed Beshr
- (United Arab Emirates) Waleed Beshr
- (United Arab Emirates) Ali Karim
- (United Arab Emirates) Ali Mohammad
- (United Arab Emirates) Hesham Muntaser
- (United States) Jason Santos
- (United States) Christopher Toth
- (Uruguay) Guillermo Costa
- (Uruguay) Andrés Laens
- (Uruguay) Santiago Miranda

1 own goal

- (Portugal) Rui Coimbra (against Brazil)
- (Senegal) Lansana Diassy (against Portugal)
- (Senegal) Ibra Thioune (against Russia)

Source: FIFA

=== Assists ===
Only players who recorded multiple assists are listed. (Note: FIFA does not publish a complete list of assists. Assists are only partially published – as part of its list of goalscorers and so players who assisted but did not score are not documented. The source of this complete list of assists is from a third-party. Note that there are discrepancies between the information available from FIFA and this source.)

7 assists

- (Portugal) Bê Martins
- (Italy) Dario Ramacciotti

6 assists

- (Italy) Simone Del Mestre
- (Russia) Anton Shkarin

4 assists

- (Russia) Yury Krasheninnikov
- (Portugal) Jordan Santos
- (Japan) Ozu Moreira
- (Senegal) Al Seyni Ndiaye
- (Switzerland) Sandro Spaccarotella

3 assists

- (Japan) Teruki Tabata
- (Japan) Takaaki Oba
- (Nigeria) Azeez Abu
- (Brazil) Bruno Xavier
- (Switzerland) Philipp Borer
- (Russia) Aleksey Makarov
- (Russia) Andrei Novikov
- (Italy) Paolo Palmacci
- (Japan) Shusei Yamauchi

2 assists

- (Russia) Maksim Chuzhkov
- (French Polynesia) Jonathan Torohia
- (Italy) Josep Junior Gentilin
- (Oman) Younis Al Owaisi
- (Switzerland) Noël Ott
- (Uruguay) Andrés Laens
- (Russia) Dmitry Shishin
- (Portugal) Belchior
- (French Polynesia) Heiarii Tavanae
- (Belarus) Illia Savich
- (Paraguay) Jesús Rolón
- (Uruguay) Luis Quinta
- (French Polynesia) Raimana Li Fung Kuee
- (United States) Christopher Toth
- (Russia) Artur Paporotnyi
- (Brazil) Rafinha
- (Brazil) Antonio
- (Brazil) Bokinha
- (Brazil) Rodrigo
- (Senegal) Babacar Fall
- (Italy) Francesco Corosiniti
- (Italy) Emmanuele Zurlo
- (Portugal) Léo Martins

1 assist

- 44 players

Source: BSRussia

=== Discipline ===
Team & match statistics

- Total number of yellow cards issued: 83
- Average yellow cards per match: 2.59
- Total number of red cards issued: 7
- Average red cards per match: 0.22
- First yellow card of the tournament:
  Heimanu Taiarui of Tahiti against Italy
- First red card of the tournament:
  Heiarii Tavanae of Tahiti against Italy
- Most cards issued (match): 7 (6 yellow, 1 red)
  Paraguay v Switzerland
- Fewest cards issued (match): 0
  Japan v Switzerland,
  Belarus v United Arab Emirates,
  Nigeria v Oman,
  Brazil v Russia
- Most yellow cards (team): 12
  Italy
- Most red cards (team): 2
  Tahiti
- Fewest yellow cards (team): 1
  United Arab Emirates
- Total number of fouls committed: 389
- Average fouls committed per match: 12.16
- Most fouls committed (team, avg. per match): 10
  Tahiti
- Most fouls suffered (team, avg. per match): 10
  Paraguay
- Fewest fouls committed (team, avg. per match): 1
  United Arab Emirates
- Fewest fouls suffered (team, avg. per match): 2
  Oman
- Total number of penalties awarded: 24 (17 converted, 71% rate)
- Average penalties awarded per match: 0.75
- Most penalties awarded (team): 4
  Brazil
  Italy
- Fewest penalties awarded (team): 0
  Belarus
  Japan
  Nigeria
  Oman
  Russia

Player statistics

- Red cards received (red card) : 1
  (Russia) Artur Paporotnyi
  (French Polynesia) Heiarii Tavanae
  (French Polynesia) Jonathan Torohia
  (Nigeria) Victor Tale
  (Paraguay) Yoao Rolón
  (Belarus) Ihar Bryshtel
- Most yellow cards received (yellow card) : 3
  (Russia) Aleksey Makarov
  (Italy) Alfioluca Chiavaro
  (Uruguay) Guillermo Costa
- Second yellow cards received (yellow card) (yellow-red card) : 1
  (French Polynesia) Angelo Tchen

Sources: FIFA (team), FIFA (player), Penalties

=== Final standings ===
Pos	Grp	Team	Pld	W	W+	WP	L	GF	GA	GD	Pts	Final result
1	D	Portugal	6	4	0	1	1	33	20	+13	13	Champions
2	B	Italy	6	3	1	0	2	38	27	+11	11	Runners-up
3	C	Russia	6	4	0	0	2	30	29	+1	12	Third place
4	A	Japan	6	4	0	0	2	24	20	+4	12	Fourth place
5	D	Brazil	4	3	0	0	1	32	15	+17	9	Eliminated in Quarter-finals
6	C	Senegal	4	2	0	0	2	19	15	+4	6	Eliminated in Quarter-finals
7	B	Uruguay	4	2	0	0	2	11	12	−1	6	Eliminated in Quarter-finals
8	A	Switzerland	4	1	1	0	2	22	22	0	5	Eliminated in Quarter-finals
9	B	Tahiti	3	2	0	0	1	16	17	−1	6	Eliminated in Group stage
10	A	Paraguay (H)	3	1	0	0	2	15	13	+2	3	Eliminated in Group stage
11	C	Belarus	3	1	0	0	2	10	13	−3	3	Eliminated in Group stage
12	C	United Arab Emirates	3	1	0	0	2	6	9	−3	3	Eliminated in Group stage
13	D	Oman	3	1	0	0	2	9	16	−7	3	Eliminated in Group stage
14	A	United States	3	0	0	0	3	10	17	−7	0	Eliminated in Group stage
15	B	Mexico	3	0	0	0	3	3	13	−10	0	Eliminated in Group stage
16	D	Nigeria	3	0	0	0	3	8	28	−20	0	Eliminated in Group stage

Source: FIFA
(H) Host

== Media ==
=== Broadcasting rights ===
180 territories broadcast matches of the tournament.

The following tables are a summary of some notable and participating territories' broadcasting licensee holders.

Individual territories listed that are also part of regional deals show the additional broadcasting licenses in those territories.

Territory	Broadcaster licensees	Ref
Afghanistan	ATN	
Albania	RTSH	
Argentina	RTE SE	
Armenia	ARMTV	
Australia	Optus	
Austria	ORF	
Azerbaijan	İTV	
Belarus	BTRC	
Belgium	VRT, RTBF	
Brazil	Band	
Bulgaria	BNT	
Canada	CTV, TSN, RDS	
Caribbean (Note: The FIFA/DirecTV deal covers the rights in 20 territories of the Caribbean and 10 territories of South America)	DirecTV Latin America	
China	CCTV	
Colombia	RCN Televisión, Caracol Televisión	
Croatia	HRT	
Cyprus	CyBC	
Czech Republic	Czech Television	
Estonia	ERR	
France (& Overseas France)	Canal+	
French Polynesia	TNTV Tahiti	
Greece	ERT	
Hungary	MTVA	
Iceland	RÚV	
Indian subcontinent (Note: The FIFA/Sony deal covers the rights in 7 territories on the Indian Subcontinent)	Sony Pictures Networks India	
Ireland	RTÉ	
Israel	IPBC	
Italy	Sky Sport	
Japan	Fuji Television, J Sports	

Territory	Broadcaster licensees	Ref
(North Korea) Korea, North & (South Korea) Korea, South	MBC, KBS	
Kosovo	RTK	
Latvia	LTV	
Lithuania	LRT	
North Macedonia	RTV	
Malaysia & Brunei	Astro	
Malta	PBS	
Mexico	Televisa	
Middle East and North Africa (Note: The FIFA/beIN Sports deal covers the rights in 23 territories of the Arab League)	BeIN Sports	
Netherlands	NOS	
New Zealand	Sky Sports	
Panama	TVN, RPC TV Canal 4	
Paraguay	TIGO Sports	
Poland	Telewizja Polska	
Portugal	RTP	
Romania	TVR	
Russia	2Sport2	
Senegal	RTS	
Serbia	РТС	
Slovakia	RTVS	
Slovenia	RTVSLO	
South America	DirecTV Latin America	
Spain	Mediapro	
Sub-Saharan Africa (Note: The FIFA/SuperSport deal covers the rights in 43 territories of Sub-Saharan Africa)	SuperSport International	
Switzerland	SRG SSR	
Turkey	TRT	
Uruguay	Canal 10, Teledoce, Monte Carlo TV, ANTEL	
United States	Fox Sports, Telemundo, Fútbol de Primera	
Venezuela	Galaxy Entertainment	

=== Closing report ===
==== Social media ====
At the closing press conference on 30 November, head of FIFA Tournaments, Jaime Yarza reported that social media posts had generated over 46 million impressions, 1.7 million user interactions and 14 million video views, setting a new record for social media engagement of the FIFA Beach Soccer World Cup, which Yarza claimed showed the continued growth of the sport.

==== Economic impact ====
Prior to the tournament, the Paraguayan Football Association (APF) estimated the competition would generate US$5 million for the local economy. The actual economic impact was reported at three times this amount of US$15 million at the closing press conference.

==== Attendance figures ====
Despite struggling attendance figures, APF General Secretary Luis Kanonnikoff declared "we are happy with the attendance numbers of both locals and foreigners."
