= Patrick Diaiké =

New Caledonian footballer (born 1980)

Personal information
- Full name: Patrick Diaiké
- Date of birth: 25 May 1980 (age 46)
- Place of birth: New Caledonia
- Position: Central midfielder

Youth career
- AS Mont-Dore

Senior career*
Years	Team	Apps	(Gls)
2006–2012	AS Mont-Dore		
2012–2016	Gaïtcha FCN		
2016	AS Magenta		

International career^{‡}
2007–2011	New Caledonia	17	(1)
Medal record
Men's football
Representing New Caledonia
OFC Nations Cup
Runner-up	2008 Oceania
Pacific Games
Gold medal – first place	2007 Samoa
- * Club domestic league appearances and goals as of 17 September 2018 ‡ National team caps and goals as of 31 March 2018

Patrick Holen Diaiké (born 25 May 1980) is a footballer who has played for the New Caledonia national team.

== Honours ==
New Caledonia

- OFC Nations Cup: Runner-up, 2008
- Pacific Games: Gold Medalist, 2007
