= Cook Islands national beach soccer team =

Cook Islands
- Association: Cook Islands; Football Association
- Confederation: OFC (Oceania)
- FIFA code: COK
- BSWW ranking: NR (2 June 2025)
First colours	Second colours

OFC Beach Soccer Championship
- Appearances: 1 (first in 2006)
- Best result: 4º Place in 2006

The Cook Islands national beach soccer team represents the Cook Islands in international beach soccer competitions and is controlled by the Cook Islands Football Association, the governing body for football in the Cook Islands.

To date, the Cook Islands have competed just once in Oceania's major beach football championship, the OFC Beach Soccer Championship, in 2006.

== Achievements ==
- OFC Beach Soccer Championship Best: 4th place
  - 2006

== Current squad ==
Correct as of September 2006.

Note: Flags indicate national team as defined under FIFA eligibility rules; some limited exceptions apply. Players may hold more than one non-FIFA nationality.

No.	Pos.	Nation	Player
1			Rouruoaroa Une
2			John Pareanga (captain)
3			Eugene Tattuava
4			Grover Harmon
5			Teariki Mateariki

No.	Pos.	Nation	Player
6			Paavo Mustonen
7			Ruatoto Henry
8			Eddie Brogan
9			Tereapii Angene
11			Anonga Tisam
