= 2013 OFC Beach Soccer Championship =

2013 FIFA Beach Soccer World Cup qualification (OFC)
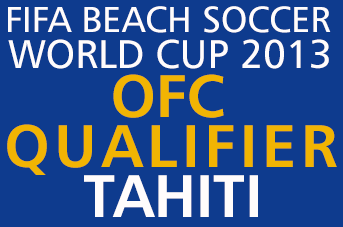

Tournament details
- Host country: New Caledonia
- Dates: 31 August – 2 September 2013
- Teams: 3 (from 1 confederation)
- Venue: 1 (in 1 host city)

Final positions
- Champions: Solomon Islands (4th title)
- Runners-up: New Caledonia
- Third place: Vanuatu

Tournament statistics
- Matches played: 3
- Goals scored: 30 (10 per match)
- Top scorer: (Solomon Islands) Joseph Luwi (5 goals)
- Best player: (Solomon Islands) Samson Takayama
- Best goalkeeper: (Solomon Islands) Fred Hale

The 2013 OFC Beach Soccer Championship took place from 31 August to 2 September 2013 on the grounds of the University of New Caledonia in Nouméa, New Caledonia. It acted as a qualifier for the 2013 FIFA Beach Soccer World Cup. This time around, a second OFC team qualified alongside Tahiti for the World Cup, due to the facts that Tahiti is the host of the World Cup and that the OFC is only supposed to have one representative.

The tournament was originally scheduled to take place in Papeete, Tahiti from 4 – 9 August however due to the Tahitian national squad being involved in a European tour it was decided that the competition would be moved to New Caledonia.

== Participating teams ==
Three teams have been confirmed to be participating in the tournament

- New Caledonia
- Solomon Islands
- Vanuatu

== Group stage ==
Due to numerous delays in the tournament's administration, the official schedule was not released until 22 August 2013, when the draw was conducted. The first-place finisher was declared the winner of the tournament.

All kickoff times are listed as local time in New Caledonia, (UTC+11:00).

Team	Pld	W	W+	L	GF	GA	+/-	Pts
Solomon Islands	2	2	0	0	14	3	+11	6
New Caledonia	2	1	0	1	7	12	−5	3
Vanuatu	2	0	0	2	9	15	−6	0

31 August 2013
15:30

Solomon Islands	8–3	Vanuatu
J. Luwi 7', 30'; R. Laua 15'; J. Naka 20' (pen.), 22', 26'; M. Aisa 21'; A. Talo 24'	Report	5' A. Malapa; 35' I. Wilson; 36' D. Natou

University of New Caledonia, Nouméa
Referee: (Fiji) Rajinesh Dave

1 September 2013
14:00

Vanuatu	6–7	New Caledonia
A. Malapa 15', 34'; D. Mansale 21'; D. Michel 22'; R. Tom 36', 36'	Report	2' O. Dokunengo; 10', 27' K. Dokunengo; 25', 35', 35' R. Djamali; 34' J.-P. Ayawa

University of New Caledonia, Nouméa
Referee: (Solomon Islands) Hugo Pado

2 September 2013
12:00

New Caledonia	0–6	Solomon Islands
	Report	16', 33', 35' J. Luwi; 30' A. Talo; 33' S. Takayama; 36' R. Laua

University of New Caledonia, Nouméa
Referee: (Fiji) Rajinesh Dave

== Winners ==
2013 FIFA Beach Soccer World Cup
Qualification (OFC) Winners:

Solomon Islands
Fourth title

== Awards ==
Best Player (MVP)
(Solomon Islands) Samson Takayama
Top Scorer(s)
(Solomon Islands) Joseph Luwi (5 goals)
Best Goalkeeper
(Solomon Islands) Fred Hale
FIFA Fair Play Award

== Teams qualifying ==
	Team
1st Place	Solomon Islands

== Final standings ==
Rank	Team
1	Solomon Islands
2	New Caledonia
3	Vanuatu
