= James Naka =

Solomon Islands footballer (born 1984)

Personal information
- Full name: James Naka
- Date of birth: October 9, 1984 (age 42)
- Place of birth: Honiara, Solomon Islands
- Positions: Midfielder; forward

Team information
- Current team: Nalkutan
- Number: 10

Senior career*
Years	Team	Apps	(Gls)
2006–2010	Kossa	21	(5)
2011–2014	Koloale FC Honiara		
2014–2015	Amicale		
2015–2017	Western United		(27)
2017–2018	Kossa		
2018	Nalkutan		
2019–	Galaxy		(5)

International career
2010–	Solomon Islands	25	(3)
2006–2009	Solomon Islands Beach Soccer	10	(14)
Medal record
Men's football
Representing Solomon Islands
Pacific Games
Silver medal – second place	2011 New Caledonia
- * Club domestic league appearances and goals

James Naka (born 9 October 1984 in Honiara) is a Solomon Islands footballer currently playing for Nalkutan. He plays as a midfielder or forward. He has played in 10 editions of the FIFA Beach Soccer World Cup and also represented his country 7 times.

== International career ==
=== International goals ===
Scores and results list Solomon Islands' goal tally first.

No	Date	Venue	Opponent	Score	Result	Competition
1.	3 September 2011	Stade Rivière Salée, Nouméa, New Caledonia	Tuvalu	3–0	6–1	2011 Pacific Games
2.	3 September 2011	Stade Rivière Salée, Nouméa, New Caledonia	Tuvalu	5–0	6–1	2011 Pacific Games
3.	5 September 2011	Stade Rivière Salée, Nouméa, New Caledonia	New Caledonia	2–1	2–1	2011 Pacific Games

== Honours ==
Solomon Islands

- Pacific Games: Silver Medalist, 2011
