= Vanuatu national beach soccer team =

National sports team

Vanuatu
- Association: Vanuatu Football Federation
- Confederation: OFC (Oceania)
- Head coach: Wilson Marango
- Captain: Don Mansale
- FIFA code: VAN
- BSWW ranking: NR (1 June 2026)
First colours
Second colours

OFC Beach Soccer Championship
- Appearances: 4 (first in 2006)
- Best result: Runners Up (2006, 2007, 2009)

The Vanuatu national beach soccer team represents Vanuatu in international beach soccer competitions and is controlled by the Vanuatu Football Federation, the governing body for football in Vanuatu.

== Current squad ==
The following players were called to the squad for the 2019 OFC Beach Soccer Nations Cup from 17–22 June 2019.
Caps and goals updated as of 1 June 2019 before the game against Tahiti.

No.	Pos.	Player	Date of birth (age)	Caps	Goals	Club
1	GK	Seiloni Iaruel	17 April 1995 (age 31)	5	1	(Vanuatu Football Federation) Amicale
12	GK	Alfred Malas	27 January 1987 (age 39)	0	0	(Vanuatu Football Federation) Tafea
2	MF	Don Mansale	12 October 1991 (age 34)	5	7	(Vanuatu Football Federation) Tupuji Imere
3	MF	Ivong Wilson	27 December 1992 (age 33)	5	5	(Vanuatu Football Federation) Shepherds United
4	MF	Octav Meltecoin	15 May 1990 (age 36)	5	6	(Vanuatu Football Federation) Galaxy
5	MF	Antonio Malapa	17 October 1976 (age 49)	5	1	(Vanuatu Football Federation) Tupuji Imere
6	MF	Reece Tasip	11 April 1995 (age 31)	5	2	(Vanuatu Football Federation) Port Vila
7	MF	Harison Massing	27 July 1997 (age 29)	5	1	(Vanuatu Football Federation) Shepherds United
8	MF	Eddison Stephen	2 October 1992 (age 33)	2	0	(Vanuatu Football Federation) Tafea
9	MF	Johndas Thomas	19 February 1996 (age 30)	4	2	(Vanuatu Football Federation) Malampa Revivors
10	MF	Evaristo Kapalu	4 July 1998 (age 28)	5	4	(Vanuatu Football Federation) Tafea
11	MF	Timothy Boulet	29 November 1998 (age 27)	5	11	(Vanuatu Football Federation) Tafea

== Achievements ==
- FIFA Beach Soccer World Cup qualification (OFC) Best: Runners-up
  - 2006, 2007, 2009
