= Solomon Islands national beach soccer team =

Solomon Islands
- Nickname(s): Bilikiki; Bilikiki Boys
- Association: Solomon Islands Football Federation
- Confederation: OFC (Oceania)
- Head coach: Gideon Omokirio
- Captain: James Naka
- FIFA code: SOL
- BSWW ranking: 30 ▼3 (2 September 2026)
First colours
Second colours

World Cup
- Appearances: 5 (first in 2006)
- Best result: Group stage (2006, 2007, 2008, 2009, 2013)

OFC Beach Soccer Championship
- Appearances: 8 (first in 2006)
- Best result: Champions (2006, 2007, 2009, 2013)

The Solomon Islands national beach soccer team represents Solomon Islands in international beach soccer competitions and is controlled by S.I.F.F, the governing body for football in Solomon Islands.

The team are known as the Bilikiki, or Bilikiki Boys, after a sea bird which inspired "a popular children's song". The team have adopted both the bird and the song, and are "known for performing the song and [related] dance when they win their matches".

They are statistically the best team in Oceania. Ranked fourteenth in the world as of 2010, they have won every regional championship since regional championships began in 2006. Their opening match 7–6 victory over Uruguay (former world finalists) in the 2009 World Cup has been described as "Solomon Islands' biggest achievement so far in a FIFA tournament".

In January 2011, the Bilikiki played a friendly beach soccer match against the Kurukuru, the Solomon Islands national futsal team, which is also one of the most successful teams in Oceania. The Bilikiki won 4–1. Previously, the two teams had met for a friendly futsal match, which the Kurukuru had won 5–3.

== Current squad ==
Correct as of September 2013

Note: Flags indicate national team as defined under FIFA eligibility rules; some limited exceptions apply. Players may hold more than one non-FIFA nationality.

No.	Pos.	Nation	Player
1	GK		Abraham Bird
2	DF		Samson Takayama
3	FW		Seni Ngava
4	DF		Patrick Marie
5	FW		Anthony Talo
6	FW		Nicholas Muri

No.	Pos.	Nation	Player
7	FW		Robert Laua
8	DF		McPhilip Aisa
9	FW		Augustine Anisi
10	FW		James Naka
11	FW		Joe Luwi
12	GK		Fred Hale

Coach: Gideon Omokirio

== Achievements ==
- OFC Beach Soccer Championship: WINNERS
  - 2006, 2007, 2009, 2013

Note: No 2008 championship – Solomon Islands were automatically selected as the best team in the continent for the world cup)
