= 2007 OFC Beach Soccer Championship =

2007 FIFA Beach Soccer World Cup qualifiers for (OFC)

Tournament details
- Host country: New Zealand
- Dates: 31 August - 3 September 2007
- Teams: 4 (from 1 confederation)
- Venue: 1 (in 1 host city)

Final positions
- Champions: Solomon Islands (2nd title)
- Runners-up: Vanuatu
- Third place: New Zealand
- Fourth place: Tahiti

Tournament statistics
- Matches played: 8
- Goals scored: 75 (9.38 per match)

The 2007 OFC Beach Soccer championship also known as the 2007 FIFA Beach Soccer World Cup qualifiers for (OFC) was the second beach soccer championship for Oceania, held from late August to early September, in North Shore, Auckland, New Zealand. The Solomon Islands won the championship and moved on to play in the 2007 FIFA Beach Soccer World Cup in Rio de Janeiro, Brazil from 2 to 11 November.

== Participating nations ==
- New Zealand
- Solomon Islands
- Tahiti
- Vanuatu

== Group stage ==
Team	Pts	Pld	W	L	GF	GA	GD
Vanuatu	9	3	3	0	23	15	+8
Solomon Islands	6	3	2	1	11	9	+2
Tahiti	3	3	1	2	14	20	-6
New Zealand	0	3	0	3	16	23	-7

=== Day 1 ===
31 August 2006
13:00

Vanuatu	3 – 2	Solomon Islands

North Shore, Auckland

31 August 2006
15:00

Tahiti	9 – 5	New Zealand

North Shore, Auckland

=== Day 2 ===
1 September 2006
13:00

Vanuatu	10 – 5	Tahiti

North Shore, Auckland

1 September 2006
15:00

Solomon Islands	4 – 3	New Zealand

North Shore, Auckland

=== Day 3 ===
2 September 2006
13:00

Solomon Islands	5 – 3	Tahiti

North Shore, Auckland

2 September 2006
15:00

Vanuatu	10 – 8	New Zealand

North Shore, Auckland

== Knockout stage ==
=== Third place play-off ===
3 September 2006
13:00

Tahiti	3 – 5	New Zealand

North Shore, Auckland

=== Final ===
3 September 2006
15:00

Solomon Islands	5 – 3	Vanuatu

North Shore, Auckland

== Winners ==
(2007) FIFA Beach Soccer World Cup
Qualification (OFC) Winners:

Solomon Islands
Second title

== Final standings ==
Rank	Team
1	Solomon Islands
2	Vanuatu
3	New Zealand
4	Tahiti
