= 2006 OFC Beach Soccer Championship =

2006 FIFA Beach Soccer World Cup qualifiers for (OFC)

Tournament details
- Host country: Tahiti
- Dates: 31 August - 3 September 2006
- Teams: 4 (from 1 confederation)
- Venue: 1 (in 1 host city)

Final positions
- Champions: Solomon Islands (1st title)
- Runners-up: Vanuatu
- Third place: Tahiti
- Fourth place: Cook Islands

Tournament statistics
- Matches played: 8
- Goals scored: 64 (8 per match)
- Top scorer: (French Polynesia) Teva Izal (11 goals)
- Best player: (French Polynesia) Teva Izal
- Best goalkeeper: (Vanuatu) Chikau Mansale
- Fair play award: Cook Islands

The 2006 OFC Beach Soccer championship also known as the 2006 FIFA Beach Soccer World Cup qualifiers for (OFC) was the first beach soccer championship for Oceania, held from late August to early September, in Moorea, Tahiti, French Polynesia. The Solomon Islands won the championship, who moved on to play in the 2006 FIFA Beach Soccer World Cup in Rio de Janeiro, Brazil from 2 November - 12 November.

== Competing nations ==
- Cook Islands
- Tahiti (hosts)
- Solomon Islands
- Vanuatu

== Group stage ==
Team	Pts	Pld	W	L	GF	GA	GD
Vanuatu	9	3	3	0	26	9	+17
Solomon Islands	6	3	2	1	20	11	+9
Tahiti (H)	3	3	1	2	14	9	+5
Cook Islands	0	3	0	3	2	37	-35

=== Day 1 ===
31 August 2006
13:00

Vanuatu	9 – 4	Solomon Islands
Sam; Maleb; K. Masauvakalo; Malas; Soromon; F. Masauvakalo; Chilia		Koto; Naka

Temea Beach, Moorea

31 August 2006
14:30

Tahiti	8 – 1	Cook Islands
T. Qaeze; Izal; Terevaura; J. Qaeze		Mateariki

Temea Beach, Moorea

=== Day 2 ===
1 September 2006
13:00

Cook Islands	1 – 12	Vanuatu
Harmon		Soromon; Sam; Chilia; F. Masauvakalo; K. Masauvakalo; Maleb

Temea Beach, Moorea

1 September 2006
14:30

Tahiti	2 – 3	Solomon Islands
Lee Fung Kuee; Tchen		Naka; Anisua

Temea Beach, Moorea

=== Day 3 ===
2 September 2006
13:00

Solomon Islands	13 – 0	Cook Islands
Anisua; Koto; Omokirio; Naka

Temea Beach, Moorea

2 September 2006
14:30

Tahiti	4 – 5	Vanuatu
Izal; Lee Fung Kuee		Soromon; Maleb; Malas; Chilia

Temea Beach, Moorea

== Knockout stage ==
=== Third place play-off ===
3 September 2006
13:00

Tahiti	12 – 4	Cook Islands
Izal; Lee Fung Kuee; Terevaura; Malfati		Harmon; Angene; Mateariki; Mustonen

Temea Beach, Moorea

=== Final ===
3 September 2006
15:00

Vanuatu	2 – 6	Solomon Islands
Maleb		Anisua; Koto; Naka; Omokirio

Temea Beach, Moorea

== Winners ==
(2006) FIFA Beach Soccer World Cup
Qualification (OFC) Winners:

Solomon Islands
First title

== Final standings ==
Rank	Team
1	Solomon Islands
2	Vanuatu
3	Tahiti
4	Cook Islands
