= 2013 FIFA Beach Soccer World Cup =

Coupe du monde de football de plage 2013

Tournament details
- Host country: Tahiti
- City: Papeete
- Dates: 18–28 September
- Teams: 16 (from 6 confederations)
- Venue: 1 (in 1 host city)

Final positions
- Champions: Russia (2nd title)
- Runners-up: Spain
- Third place: Brazil
- Fourth place: Tahiti

Tournament statistics
- Matches played: 32
- Goals scored: 243 (7.59 per match)
- Attendance: 109,650 (3,427 per match)
- Top scorer(s): (Russia) Dmitry Shishin (11 goals)
- Best player: (Brazil) Bruno Xavier
- Best goalkeeper: (Spain) Dona
- Fair play award: Russia

The 2013 FIFA Beach Soccer World Cup was the seventh edition of the FIFA Beach Soccer World Cup. Overall, this was the 17th edition of a world cup in beach soccer since the establishment of the Beach Soccer World Championships which ran from 1995–2004 but was not governed by FIFA. It took place from 18–28 September 2013 at Tahua To'ata Stadium (Stade Tahua To'ata) in Papeete, Tahiti, French Polynesia and was the fourth tournament to have taken place outside Brazil. This was the second tournament to take place since the establishment of a longer two-year cycle of tournaments. This was also the first FIFA tournament held in a Pacific country other than New Zealand, and the first senior FIFA tournament took place in the region.

The tournament was confirmed in March 2010. Russia successfully defended their title after defeating Spain in the final with a score of 5–1.

== Qualifying rounds ==
=== Hosts ===
Tahiti qualified automatically as hosts.

=== African Zone ===
The CAF qualifiers took place from 22–26 May 2013 in El Jadida, Morocco to determine the two teams for the finals. The qualifiers were originally scheduled for 10–14 April, and then 29 May-2 June 2013 in Casablanca. Senegal and Ivory Coast qualified for the two available spots.

=== Asian Zone ===
The AFC qualifiers took place from 22–26 January 2013 at a temporary stadium and adjacent pitch on the Katara Beach in Doha, Qatar, to determine the three teams to qualify for the finals. Iran, Japan and the United Arab Emirates took the three spots.

=== European Zone ===
The UEFA qualifiers took place in Moscow, Russia on 1–8 July 2012. Spain, Russia, Ukraine and the Netherlands grabbed the four available spots.

=== North, Central American and Caribbean Zone ===
The CONCACAF qualifiers took place from 8–12 May 2013 in Nassau, Bahamas to determine the two spots available. The United States, and El Salvador claimed the two spots.

=== Oceanian Zone ===
The OFC qualifiers took place from 30 August to 2 September 2013 on the grounds of the University of New Caledonia in Nouméa, New Caledonia to determine the second OFC team to qualify for the FIFA Beach Soccer World Cup (Tahiti having already qualified as hosts). They were originally to have taken place from 4–9 August 2013 in the 2013 FIFA Beach Soccer World Cup's host city of Papeete, Tahiti. Due to difficulties with the dimensions of the pitch that was to be used for the qualifiers, and Tahiti's declined not to participate in the tournament, it was decided that the tournament should be moved to reduce costs. It was originally scheduled for 12–14 June.

=== South American Zone ===
The CONMEBOL qualifiers took place from 10–17 February 2013 at a temporary stadium in Merlo, a town in the San Luis Province of Argentina, to determine the three spots available. Argentina, Brazil and Paraguay claimed the three spots.

== Teams ==
The allocation of slots for this competition was approved by the FIFA Executive Committee in May 2012.

These are the teams that qualified for the World Cup:

Asian zone (AFC)

- Iran
- Japan
- United Arab Emirates

African zone (CAF)

- Ivory Coast
- Senegal

European zone (UEFA)

- Netherlands
- Russia
- Spain
- Ukraine

North, Central American and Caribbean zone (CONCACAF)

- El Salvador
- United States

Oceanian zone (OFC)

- Solomon Islands
- Tahiti (hosts)

South American zone (CONMEBOL)

- Argentina
- Brazil
- Paraguay

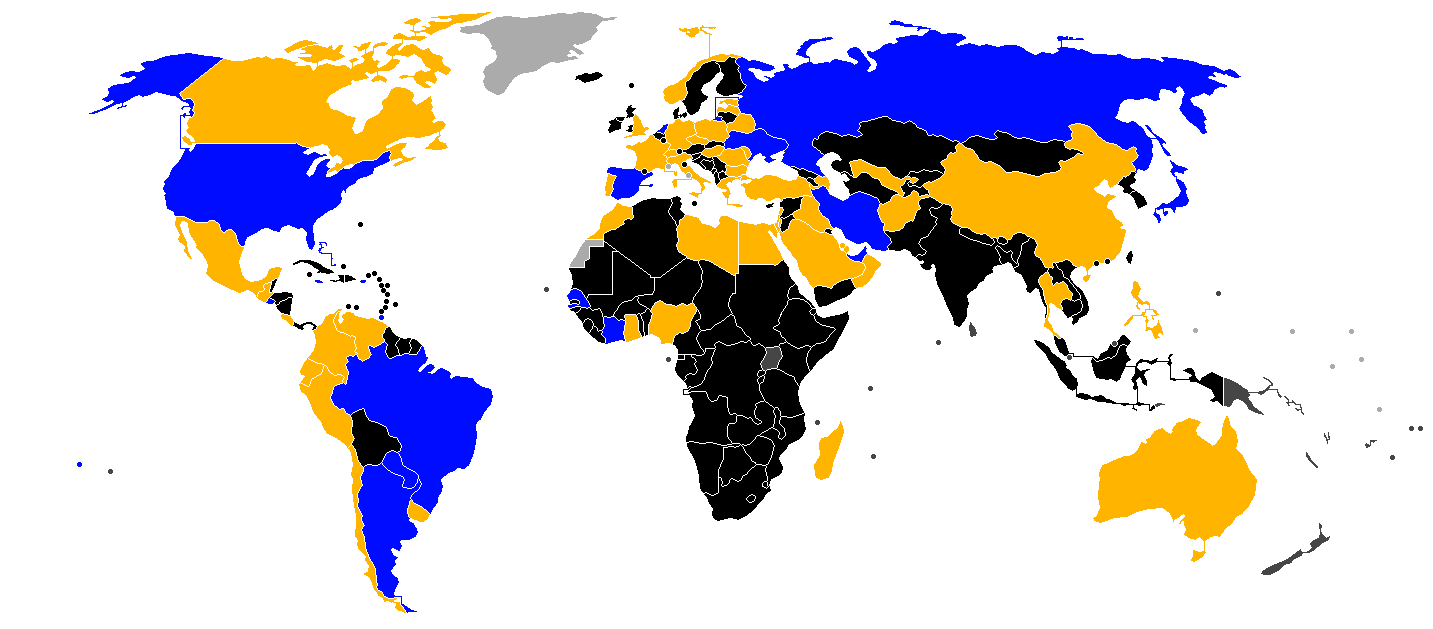
Qualified for World Cup finals Entered qualifying rounds but failed to qualify for World Cup finals Yet to confirm participation in World Cup qualifiers Did not enter the World Cup Not an associate member of FIFA

== Venue ==
All matches were played at the Tahua To'ata Stadium in Papeete.

Papeete
Tahua To'ata Stadium
Capacity: 4,000

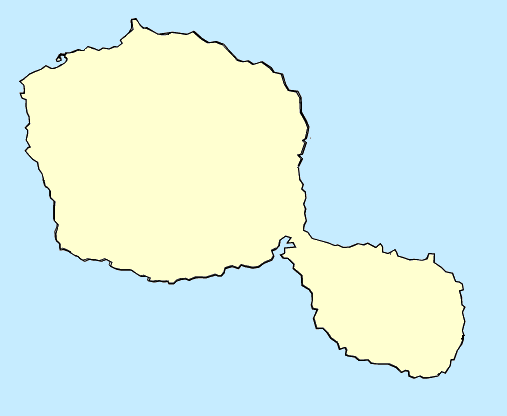
2013 FIFA Beach Soccer World Cup (Tahiti)

== Match ball ==
All matches were played using the new Adidas Cafusa match ball; this version was slightly-modified from the match ball used at the 2013 FIFA Confederations Cup.

== Official song ==
Tu'e Popo' by Sabrina was the official song of the tournament, and the video features the island rhythms of the host country and the city of Papeete.

== Referees ==
FIFA chose 24 officials to referee the matches at the World Cup. From the 24 referees, at least one referee representing each confederation; four from the AFC, three from CAF, five from CONMEBOL, three from CONCACAF, one from the OFC and eight from UEFA, with all 24 officials being from different countries. The referees were revealed in July 2013.

AFC	CAF	CONCACAF	CONMEBOL	OFC	UEFA	
(Malaysia) Suhaimi Mat Hassan (Thailand) Suwat Wongsuwan (United Arab Emirates) Ebrahim Almansory (Uzbekistan) Bakhtiyor Namazov	(Madagascar) Said Hachim (Morocco) Driss Lamghaidar (Tunisia) Bessem Boubaker	(El Salvador) Oscar Velásquez (Mexico) Miguel Aguilar (Panama) Gumercindo Batista	(Argentina) Mariano Romo (Brazil) Felipe Varejão (Chile) Patricio Blanca (Ecuador) José Cortéz (Peru) Micke Palomino	(Solomon Islands) Hugo Pado	(Belgium) Emmanuel Vocale (Italy) Gionni Matticoli (Netherlands) Michael Medina (Poland) Tomasz Winiarczyk	(Russia) Alexander Berezkin (Spain) Ruben Eiriz (Switzerland) Christian Zimmermann (Turkey) Serdar Akçer

== Draw ==
The final draw was held on 5 June 2013 at 19:30 (local time) at the Maison de la Culture (Te Fare Tauhiti Nui) in Papeete, Tahiti. The hosts, Tahiti, and the defending champions, Russia, were assigned to positions A1 and D1 prior to the draw. Teams from the same confederation could not be drawn against each other at the group stage.

Pot 1 (Hosts & CONMEBOL)	Pot 2 (CAF & CONCACAF)	Pot 3 (AFC & OFC)	Pot 4 (UEFA)
Tahiti (assigned to A1); Argentina; Brazil; Paraguay	Ivory Coast; Senegal; El Salvador; United States	Iran; Japan; United Arab Emirates; Solomon Islands*	Netherlands; Russia (assigned to D1); Spain; Ukraine

Note: At the time the draw was conducted, the OFC qualifier was not yet known.

== Squads ==
Teams must name a 12-man squad (two of whom must be goalkeepers) by the FIFA deadline. The squads were announced by FIFA on 11 September 2013.

== Group stage ==
Each team earns three points for a win, two points for a win in extra time or a penalty shoot-out, and no points for a defeat.

Tie-breaking criteria

Where two or more teams end the group stage with the same number of points, their ranking is determined by the following criteria:

1. greatest number of points obtained in the group matches between the teams concerned;
2. greatest goal difference resulting from the group matches between the teams concerned;
3. greatest number of goals scored in all group matches between the teams concerned;
4. greatest goal difference in all group matches;
5. greatest number of goals scored in all group matches;
6. drawing of lots by the FIFA Organising Committee.

Legend
Group winners and runners-up advanced to the quarter-finals

All times are local, UTC−10:00.

=== Group A ===
Team	Pld	W	W+	L	GF	GA	GD	Pts
Spain	3	3	0	0	14	8	+6	9
Tahiti	3	1	1	1	10	9	+1	5
United States	3	1	0	2	13	14	−1	3
United Arab Emirates	3	0	0	3	8	14	−6	0

Source: Goalzz
19 September 2013
16:00

Spain	5–4	United States
Antonio 10', 31'; Llorenç 19'; Juanma 32'; Nico 35'	Report	Futagaki 7'; N. Perera 12'; Chimienti 15'; L. Valentine 32'

Tahua To'ata Stadium, Papeete
Attendance: 1,950
Referee: Mariano Romo (Argentina)

19 September 2013
19:00

Tahiti	3–2	United Arab Emirates
M. Amau 6'; T. Zaveroni 10'; R. Li Fung Kuee 14'	Report	H. Ali 20'; H. Alkaabi 22'

Tahua To'ata Stadium, Papeete
Attendance: 4,000
Referee: Felipe Varejao (Brazil)

21 September 2013
16:00

United Arab Emirates	2–5	Spain
H. Alkaabi 3'; H. Alhammidi 26'	Report	Antonio 17'; R. Merida 28', 36'; Llorenç 34'; Cintas 36'

Tahua To'ata Stadium, Papeete
Attendance: 2,300
Referee: Hugo Pado (Solomon Islands)

21 September 2013
19:00

United States	3–5 (a.e.t.)	Tahiti
A. Tchen 18' (o.g.); Chimienti 32'; N. Perera 35'	Report	R. Li Fung Kuee 3'; R. Bennett 4'; T. Labaste 23'; P. Tepa 39', 39'

Tahua To'ata Stadium, Papeete
Attendance: 4,000
Referee: Suwat Wongsuwan (Thailand)

23 September 2013
16:00

United Arab Emirates	4–6	United States
H. Al-Hammadi 1', 27'; K. Al-Balooshi 8'; A. Hussain 31'	Report	N. Perera 2', 17', 26'; A. Canale 8', 16'; J. Leopoldo 34'

Tahua To'ata Stadium, Papeete
Attendance: 1,100
Referee: Gumercindo Batista (Panama)

23 September 2013
19:00

Tahiti	2–4	Spain
P. Tepa 24'; R. Li Fung Kuee 34'	Report	R. Merida 4', 10'; Kuman 7'; D. Pajón 17'

Tahua To'ata Stadium, Papeete
Attendance: 4,000
Referee: Bakhtiyor Namazov (Uzbekistan)

=== Group B ===
Team	Pld	W	W+	L	GF	GA	GD	Pts
Argentina	3	2	0	1	17	11	+6	6
El Salvador	3	2	0	1	13	11	+2	6
Solomon Islands	3	1	0	2	13	15	−2	3
Netherlands	3	0	1	2	6	12	−6	2

Source: Goalzz
19 September 2013
17:30

Argentina	4–1	El Salvador
C. Leguizamón 4'; F. Hilaire 5'; M. de Ezeyza 13'; L. Medero 25'	Report	E. Robles 18'

Tahua To'ata Stadium, Papeete
Attendance: 3,700
Referee: Alexander Berezkin (Russia)

19 September 2013
20:30

Netherlands	0–2	Solomon Islands
	Report	J. Luwi 25'; N. Muri 34'

Tahua To'ata Stadium, Papeete
Attendance: 3,600
Referee: Bessem Boubaker (Tunisia)

21 September 2013
17:30

Solomon Islands	5–8	Argentina
A. Talo 12', 13', 31'; R. Laua 13'; J. Luwi 15'	Report	J. Levi 1'; F. Hilaire 16', 28'; E. Hilaire 17'; L. Medero 25', 26', 31', 31'

Tahua To'ata Stadium, Papeete
Attendance: 3,900
Referee: Christian Zimmermann (Switzerland)

21 September 2013
20:30

El Salvador	5–1	Netherlands
A. Ruiz 7', 33' (pen.); F. Velásquez 7'; T. Hernández 22'; J. Batres 35'	Report	M. van Gessel 7'

Tahua To'ata Stadium, Papeete
Attendance: 2,300
Referee: Serdar Akçer(Turkey)

23 September 2013
17:30

Solomon Islands	6–7	El Salvador
M. Aisa 12'; N. Muri 17', 19', 24'; A. Talo 31' (pen.); R. Laua 34'	Report	A. Ruiz 6', 11', 14', 20', 33'; F. Velásquez 25'; E. Robles 30'

Tahua To'ata Stadium, Papeete
Attendance: 3,700
Referee: Patricio Blanca (Chile)

23 September 2013
20:30

Netherlands	5–5 (a.e.t.)	Argentina
F. van der Geest 19'; P. Ax 20', 28'; R. van Dieren 26'; C. van den Ouweland 36'	Report	S. Hilaire 1'; J. Levi 1'; J. Vivas 4', 7', 24'
Penalties
M. van Gessel (penalty scored); P. Ax (penalty scored); R. van Dieren (penalty scored); J. Klijbroek (penalty scored)	4–3	(penalty scored) L. Medero; (penalty scored) C. Leguizamon; (penalty scored) L. Franceschini; (penalty missed) E. Hilaire

Tahua To'ata Stadium, Papeete
Attendance: 2,800
Referee: Said Hachim (Madagascar)

=== Group C ===
Team	Pld	W	W+	L	GF	GA	GD	Pts
Brazil	3	3	0	0	16	6	+10	9
Iran	3	1	0	2	8	10	−2	3
Ukraine	3	1	0	2	9	11	−2	3
Senegal	3	1	0	2	11	17	−6	3

Source: Goalzz
- Note: Iran, Ukraine and Senegal are ranked by their head-to-head results.
18 September 2013
17:30

Senegal	5–4	Ukraine
B. Fall 15', 16', 27', 35'; P. Koukpaki 22'	Report	V. Sydorenko 2'; O. Zborovskyi 3', 26'; R. Pachev 24'

Tahua To'ata Stadium, Papeete
Attendance: 3,350
Referee: José Cortéz (Ecuador)

18 September 2013
20:30

Brazil	4–1	Iran
Bruno Xavier 2', 15', 31'; Bueno 16'	Report	A. Akbari 9'

Tahua To'ata Stadium, Papeete
Attendance: 4,000
Referee: Ruben Eiriz (Spain)

20 September 2013
17:30

Iran	5–3	Senegal
M. Ahmadzadeh 2', 3', 21'; A. Akbari 16'; F. Boulokbashi 30'	Report	N. Sylla 16', 28'; P. Hosseini 16' (o.g.)

Tahua To'ata Stadium, Papeete
Attendance: 3,250
Referee: Tomasz Winiarczyk (Poland)

20 September 2013
20:30

Ukraine	2–4	Brazil
O. Zborovskyi 22'; V. Hladechenko 27'	Report	Bruno Xavier 5', 33'; Bueno 8'; Daniel 35'

Tahua To'ata Stadium, Papeete
Attendance: 2,100
Referee: Ebrahim Almansory (United Arab Emirates)

22 September 2013
17:30

Iran	2–3	Ukraine
M. Ahmadzadeh 3'; P. Hosseini 33'	Report	A. Borsuk 3'; O. Korniychuk 22'; I. Borsuk 30'

Tahua To'ata Stadium, Papeete
Attendance: 3,700
Referee: Serdar Akçer (Turkey)

22 September 2013
20:30

Brazil	8–3	Senegal
Daniel 2'; Bruno Xavier 5', 11', 30'; Bruno 6'; André 25', 26'; Jorginho 37'	Report	P. Koukpaki 10'; B. Fall 17', 28'

Tahua To'ata Stadium, Papeete
Attendance: 4,000
Referee: Suwat Wongsuwan (Thailand)

=== Group D ===
Team	Pld	W	W+	L	GF	GA	GD	Pts
Russia	3	2	1	0	13	6	+7	8
Japan	3	1	1	1	8	8	0	5
Paraguay	3	1	0	2	14	13	+1	3
Ivory Coast	3	0	0	3	11	19	−8	0

Source: Goalzz
18 September 2013
16:00

Paraguay	10–6	Ivory Coast
J. Lopez 9', 28', 31'; P. Moran 14', 28'; G. Benitez 19' (pen.); L. Pereira 20', 33'; O. Zayas 23'; E. Barreto 36'	Report	D. Kouassitchi 3', 11', 15', 31'; M. Sakanoko 7'; E. Tchetche 22'

Tahua To'ata Stadium, Papeete
Attendance: 2,800
Referee: Bakhtiyor Namazov (Uzbekistan)

18 September 2013
19:00

Russia	4–1	Japan
D. Shishin 13', 14'; Y. Krasheninnikov 31'; A. Peremitin 31'	Report	T. Tabata 28'

Tahua To'ata Stadium, Papeete
Attendance: 4,000
Referee: Said Hachim (Madagascar)

20 September 2013
16:00

Japan	3–1	Paraguay
H. Oda 2'; O. Moreira 8'; T. Tabata 14'	Report	P. Moran 26'

Tahua To'ata Stadium, Papeete
Attendance: 2,100
Referee: Oscar Velasquez (El Salvador)

20 September 2013
19:00

Ivory Coast	2–5	Russia
D. Kouassitchi 27'; M. Sakanoko 30'	Report	A. Makarov 12', 28'; E. Shaykov 15'; D. Shishin 20', 31'

Tahua To'ata Stadium, Papeete
Attendance: 3,900
Referee: Miguel Aguilar (Mexico)

22 September 2013
16:00

Japan	4–3 (a.e.t.)	Ivory Coast
S. Yamauchi 3'; O. Moreira 19', 38'; N. Matsuo 39' (pen.)	Report	D. Kouassitchi 1', 38' (pen.); M. Sakanoko 18'

Tahua To'ata Stadium, Papeete
Attendance: 2,400
Referee: Patricio Blanca (Chile)

22 September 2013
19:00

Russia	4–3 (a.e.t.)	Paraguay
A. Peremitin 1'; A. Makarov 13'; D. Shishin 16', 37'	Report	S. Amarilla 21'; P. Morán 28', 36' (pen.)

Tahua To'ata Stadium, Papeete
Attendance: 3,900
Referee: Christian Zimmermann (Switzerland)

== Knockout stage ==
Quarter-finals
25 September 2013
Spain	2
El Salvador	1
25 September 2013
Brazil	4
Japan	3
25 September 2013
Russia	6
Iran	5
25 September 2013
Argentina	1
Tahiti	6

Semi-finals
27 September 2013
Spain (a.e.t.)	2
Brazil	1
27 September 2013
Russia	5
Tahiti	3

Final
28 September 2013
Spain	1
Russia	5
Third place
28 September 2013
Brazil (p)	7 (1)
Tahiti	7 (0)

=== Quarter finals ===
25 September 2013
16:00

Brazil	4–3	Japan
Eudin 8'; Datinha 10'; Daniel 29'; Bueno 31'	Report	H. Oda 6'; O. Moreira 20' (pen.); Bueno 30' (o.g.)

Tahua To'ata Stadium, Papeete
Attendance: 4,000
Referee: Serdar Akçer (Turkey)

25 September 2013
17:30

Argentina	1–6	Tahiti
E. Hilaire 16' (pen.)	Report	H. Taiarui 9', 27'; N. Bennett 25'; R. Bennett 28'; R. Li Fung Kuee 29'; H. Tavanae 36'

Tahua To'ata Stadium, Papeete
Attendance: 4,200
Referee: Eiriz Ruben (Spain)

25 September 2013
19:00

Spain	2–1	El Salvador
Llorenç 7'; Antonio 34'	Report	W. Torres 24' (pen.)

Tahua To'ata Stadium, Papeete
Attendance: 3,900
Referee: Patricio Blanca (Chile)

25 September 2013
20:30

Russia	6–5	Iran
E. Eremeev 10', 31'; Y. Krasheninnikov 19'; A. Peremitin 22'; K. Romanov 26'; D. Shishin 34'	Report	M. Mesigar 6', 25'; F. Boloukbashi 10', 22'; M. Ahmadzadeh 33'

Tahua To'ata Stadium, Papeete
Attendance: 3,900
Referee: Hugo Pado (Solomon Islands)

=== Semi-finals ===
27 September 2013
19:00

Russia	5–3	Tahiti
D. Shishin 9', 17', 35'; A. Makarov 33', 35'	Report	P. Tepa 13'; A. Makarov 17' (o.g.); N. Bennett 26'

Tahua To'ata Stadium, Papeete
Attendance: 4,200
Referee: Patricio Blanca (Chile)

27 September 2013
20:30

Spain	2–1 (a.e.t.)	Brazil
Juanma 21'; Nico 37'	Report	Bruno Xavier 5'

Tahua To'ata Stadium, Papeete
Attendance: 4,200
Referee: Said Hachim (Madagascar)

=== Third place play-off ===
28 September 2013
19:00

Brazil	7–7 (a.e.t.)	Tahiti
Bruno Xavier 7'; Daniel 12'; André 12'; Eudin 14', 19'; Jorginho 24'; Bruno 38'	Report	R. Li Fung Kuee 1', 24'; M. Amau 12'; H. Taiarui 21', 35'; N. Bennett 33', 39'
Penalties
Jorginho (penalty scored)	1–0	(penalty missed) Li Fung Kuee

Tahua To'ata Stadium, Papeete
Attendance: 4,200
Referee: Gionni Matticoli (Italy)

=== Final ===
28 September 2013
20:30

Spain	1–5	Russia
Llorenç 24'	Report	A. Shkarin 13'; K. Romanov 15'; Y. Krasheninnikov 18', 31'; D. Shishin 36'

Tahua To'ata Stadium, Papeete
Attendance: 4,200
Referee: Serdar Akçer (Turkey)

== Winners ==
2013 FIFA Beach Soccer World Cup
champions

Russia
Second title

== Awards ==
adidas Golden Ball	adidas Silver Ball	adidas Bronze Ball
(Brazil) Bruno Xavier	(Japan) Ozu Moreira	(French Polynesia) Raimana Li Fung Kuee
adidas Golden Scorer	adidas Silver Scorer	adidas Bronze Scorer
(Russia) Dmitry Shishin	(Brazil) Bruno Xavier	(El Salvador) Agustín Ruiz
11 goals	10 goals	7 goals
adidas Golden Glove
(Spain) Francisco Jesus Donaire (Dona)
FIFA Fair Play Award
Russia

== Top scorers ==
Rank	Player	Goals
1	(Russia) Dmitry Shishin	11
2	(Brazil) Bruno Xavier	10
3	(El Salvador) Agustin Ruiz	7
4	(Ivory Coast) Daniel Kouassitchi	6
4	(Senegal) Babacar Fall	6
4	(French Polynesia) Raimana Li Fung Kuee	6
7	(Argentina) Lucas Medero	5
7	(Iran) Mohammad Ahmadzadeh	5
7	(Paraguay) Pedro Moran	5
7	(Russia) Aleksey Makarov	5
7	(United States) Nicolas Perera	5

== Final standings ==
Position	Team
1	Russia
2	Spain
3	Brazil
4	Tahiti
5	Argentina
6	El Salvador
7	Japan
8	Iran
9	Paraguay
10	United States
11	Solomon Islands
12	Ukraine
13	Senegal
14	Netherlands
15	United Arab Emirates
16	Ivory Coast
