= 2009 OFC Beach Soccer Championship =

2009 FIFA Beach Soccer World Cup qualifiers for (OFC)

Tournament details
- Host country: Tahiti
- Dates: 27–31 July 2009
- Teams: 4 (from 1 confederation)
- Venue: 1 (in 1 host city)

Final positions
- Champions: Solomon Islands (3rd title)
- Runners-up: Vanuatu
- Third place: Tahiti
- Fourth place: Fiji

Tournament statistics
- Matches played: 8
- Goals scored: 67 (8.38 per match)

The 2009 OFC Beach Soccer championship also known as the 2009 FIFA Beach Soccer World Cup qualifiers for (OFC) was the third beach soccer championship for Oceania, held from late July, in Moorea, Tahiti, French Polynesia. The Solomon Islands won the championship and moved on to play in the 2009 FIFA Beach Soccer World Cup in Dubai, United Arab Emirates from 27 July to 31 July. 4 Oceanian teams played a group stage. The first 2 played each other for the only ticket to the 2009 FIFA Beach Soccer World Cup. 3rd and 4th place played each other for the 3rd place in the final standing.

== Group stage ==
| Team | Pld | W | W+ | L | GF | GA | GD | Pts |
|---|---|---|---|---|---|---|---|---|
| Vanuatu | 3 | 1 | 2 | 0 | 14 | 9 | +5 | 7 |
| Solomon Islands | 3 | 2 | 0 | 1 | 17 | 8 | +9 | 6 |
| Tahiti | 3 | 1 | 0 | 2 | 15 | 14 | +1 | 3 |
| Fiji | 3 | 3 | 0 | 3 | 11 | 26 | -15 | 0 |

27 July 2009
14:00

| Vanuatu | 4 – 2 (AEX) | Solomon Islands |

Moorea

27 July 2009
16:00

| Tahiti | 10 – 5 | Fiji |

Moorea

28 July 2009
14:00

| Fiji | 4 – 5 (AEX) | Vanuatu |

Moorea

28 July 2009
16:00

| Tahiti | 2 – 4 | Solomon Islands |

Moorea

29 July 2009
14:00

| Solomon Islands | 11 – 2 | Fiji |

Moorea

29 July 2009
16:00

| Tahiti | 3 – 5 | Vanuatu |

Moorea

| 3rd/4th Place match |
| 1 | (French Polynesia) Tahiti | 6 |
| 2 | Fiji | 3 |

| Final |
| 1 | Vanuatu | 0 |
| 2 | Solomon Islands | 1 |

== Third-place play-off ==
31 July 2009
14:00

| Tahiti | 6 – 3 | Fiji |

Moorea

== Final ==
31 July 2009
16:00

| Vanuatu | 0 – 1 | Solomon Islands |

Moorea

== Winners ==
2009 OFC Beach Soccer Championship winners

Solomon Islands
Third title

== Final standing ==
| Rank | Team |
|---|---|
| 1 | Solomon Islands |
| 2 | Vanuatu |
| 3 | Tahiti |
| 4 | Fiji |
