= 2024 FIFA Beach Soccer World Cup squads =

List of players featuring at the 2024 FIFA Beach Soccer World Cup

The 2024 FIFA Beach Soccer World Cup was an international beach soccer tournament held in the United Arab Emirates from 15 to 25 February 2024. The sixteen national teams involved in the tournament were required by FIFA to register a squad of twelve players, including two goalkeepers. The squad size was reduced from the fourteen players allowed at the previous edition, which had been specially increased for that tournament in consideration of the "special circumstances encountered by teams due to the COVID-19 pandemic".

This article lists the national beach soccer squads that took part in the tournament. Only the players listed in these squads below were eligible to take part in the tournament, which were revealed in full on 7 February 2024.

The age listed for each player is as on 15 February 2024, the first day of the tournament and the names of the players shown are, in most circumstances, that of the FIFA Display Names listed on the official squad document issued by FIFA.

== Group A ==
=== United Arab Emirates ===
Coach: (Brazil) Victor Vasques

No.	Pos.	Player	Date of birth (age)	Club
1	GK	Mohamed Al Bahri	7 September 1988 (aged 35)	(United Arab Emirates) Shabab Al Ahli Club
2	DF	Haitham Mohamed	21 June 1980 (aged 43)	Unattached
3	FW	Ahmed Beshr	11 February 1989 (aged 35)	Unattached
4	DF	Waleed Beshr	29 May 1991 (aged 32)	Unattached
5	DF	Abbas Ali	25 January 1989 (aged 35)	Unattached
6	DF	Kamal Ali	7 May 1989 (aged 34)	Unattached
7	DF	Ahmad Malahi	29 April 1991 (aged 32)	Unattached
8	FW	Ali Mohammad	19 August 1996 (aged 27)	Unattached
9	DF	Abdulla Abbas	4 April 1994 (aged 29)	Unattached
10	FW	Walid Mohammad	1 April 1984 (aged 39)	Unattached
11	FW	Rashed Eid	22 January 1993 (aged 31)	Unattached
12	GK	Humaid Jamal	15 August 1989 (aged 34)	(United Arab Emirates) Shabab Al Ahli Club

=== Egypt ===
Coach: Moustafa Ziedan

Abdoo Elshafei was withdrawn from the squad with injury on 14 February and replaced by Hossam Salama.

No.	Pos.	Player	Date of birth (age)	Club
1	GK	Ibrahim Hassan	10 March 1998 (aged 25)	(Egypt) Merrikh
2	DF	Hassan Hussein	1 January 1991 (aged 33)	(Egypt) Orange
3	FW	Ismaeel Bahgat	28 January 1992 (aged 32)	(Egypt) Belbis
4	DF	Ahmed Elshahat	1 January 1990 (aged 34)	(Egypt) Bor Fouad
5	DF	Moustafa Sasa	27 November 1993 (aged 30)	(Egypt) Mostaqbal Watan
6	FW	Moustafa Samir	11 May 1986 (aged 37)	(Egypt) El Ghaba
7	DF	Elhusseini Taha	28 August 1995 (aged 28)	(Egypt) Eastern Company
8	DF	Mostafa Ahmed	1 November 1987 (aged 36)	Unattached
9	FW	Haitham Costa	1 September 1992 (aged 31)	(Egypt) Amer Village
10	FW	Mohamed Loha	19 October 1987 (aged 36)	(Egypt) Orange
11	FW	Hossam Salama	13 November 1982 (aged 41)	(Egypt) Suez Canal
12	GK	Mohamed Elsayed	22 November 1994 (aged 29)	(Egypt) Orange

=== United States ===
Coach: Francis Farberoff

Nick Perera (caps 94; goals 114) was withdrawn from the squad with a left knee injury on 12 February and replaced by Andres Navas.

No.	Pos.	Player	Date of birth (age)	Caps	Goals	Club
1	GK	Chris Toth	4 August 1989 (aged 34)	97	16	(United States) Tacoma Stars
2	MF	Tanner Akol	27 September 1993 (aged 30)	24	12	Unattached
3	DF	Antonio Chavez	30 January 2001 (aged 23)	35	7	Unattached
4	MF	Ricardo Carvalho	13 May 1989 (aged 34)	10	4	(United States) Milwaukee Wave
5	DF	Nicolas Perea	6 August 1992 (aged 31)	35	19	Unattached
6	DF	Cody Valcarcel	24 December 1994 (aged 29)	21	16	Unattached
7	MF	Andres Navas	31 December 1990 (aged 33)	16	5	Unattached
8	FW	Conner Rezende	21 January 1993 (aged 31)	33	5	Unattached
9	FW	Alessandro Canale	29 December 1989 (aged 34)	93	66	(United States) Tacoma Stars
10	FW	Gabriel Silveira	28 April 1992 (aged 31)	54	44	Unattached
11	MF	Chris Albiston	26 September 1992 (aged 31)	48	22	Unattached
12	GK	Austin Collier	9 June 1997 (aged 26)	11	0	Unattached

=== Italy ===
Coach: Emiliano Del Duca

No.	Pos.	Player	Date of birth (age)	Caps	Goals	Club
1	GK	Andrea Carpita	27 May 1988 (aged 35)	128	10	(Italy) Viareggio
2	MF	Ovidio Alla	28 October 1996 (aged 27)	24	5	(Italy) Napoli
3	DF	Alessandro Miceli	3 November 1986 (aged 37)	55	5	(Italy) Sambenedettese
4	MF	Gianmarco Genovali	25 February 1994 (aged 29)	36	11	(Italy) Viareggio
5	DF	Josep Junior Gentilin	19 April 2000 (aged 23)	75	31	(Italy) Sambenedettese
6	DF	Luca Bertacca	4 May 2001 (aged 22)	36	15	(Italy) Pisa
7	FW	Fabio Sciacca	16 May 1989 (aged 34)	54	18	(Italy) Napoli
8	MF	Tommaso Fazzini	18 May 2001 (aged 22)	40	10	(Italy) Viareggio
9	FW	Emmanuele Zurlo	27 February 1988 (aged 35)	186	149	(Italy) Catania
10	FW	Alessandro Remedi	2 November 1992 (aged 31)	40	19	(Italy) Viareggio
11	FW	Marco Giordani	8 August 1997 (aged 26)	53	32	(Italy) Catania
12	GK	Leandro Casapieri	31 March 1994 (aged 29)	41	9	(Italy) Pisa

== Group B ==
=== Spain ===
Coach: Cristian Mendez

No.	Pos.	Player	Date of birth (age)	Club
1	GK	Dona	16 August 1982 (aged 41)	(Spain) Malaga
2	DF	Fernando Guisado	6 October 1989 (aged 34)	(Spain) Recreativo Huelva
3	FW	Jose Oliver	4 February 2003 (aged 21)	(Spain) Levante
4	DF	Jose Arias	4 October 1998 (aged 25)	(Spain) Levante
5	FW	David Ardil	11 January 1999 (aged 25)	(Spain) Malaga
6	FW	Soleiman Batis	18 June 2002 (aged 21)	(Spain) Levante
7	DF	Domingo Cabrera	26 February 1998 (aged 25)	(Spain) San Francisco
8	DF	Pedro Garcia	7 July 1996 (aged 27)	(Spain) Malaga
9	FW	Kuman	14 September 1991 (aged 32)	(Spain) Levante
10	DF	Antonio Mayor	20 April 1983 (aged 40)	(Spain) Levante
11	FW	Chiky Ardil	17 April 1988 (aged 35)	(Spain) Melistar
12	GK	Pablo Lopez	11 December 1998 (aged 25)	(Spain) Mazarron

=== Iran ===
Coach: Ali Naderi

No.	Pos.	Player	Date of birth (age)	Club
1	GK	Hamid Behzadpour	31 May 1987 (aged 36)	(Iran) Moghavemat Golsa Poosh
2	DF	Amir Akbari	26 January 1992 (aged 32)	(Iran) Doctor Tamin Esfahan
3	DF	Reza Amiri	19 March 1997 (aged 26)	(Iran) Moghavemat Golsa Poosh
4	DF	Saeed Piramoun	2 February 1995 (aged 29)	(Iran) Pars Jonoobi
5	FW	Mohammad Moradi	31 August 1996 (aged 27)	(Iran) Moghavemat Golsa Poosh
6	FW	Mahdi Shir	28 March 1995 (aged 28)	(Iran) ChadorMalu Ardakan
7	FW	Ali Mirshekari	24 February 1997 (aged 26)	(Iran) Moghavemat Golsa Poosh
8	DF	Movahed Mohammadpour	7 January 1995 (aged 29)	(Russia) Lokomotiv Moscow
9	FW	Mohammadali Mokhtari	4 July 1990 (aged 33)	(Iran) Moghavemat Golsa Poosh
10	FW	Moslem Mesigar	17 September 1984 (aged 39)	(Iran) Pars Jonoobi
11	FW	Mohammad Masoumi	26 February 1997 (aged 26)	(Iran) Moghavemat Golsa Poosh
12	GK	Seyed Mirjalili	5 July 1999 (aged 24)	(Iran) Foolad Hormozgan

=== Tahiti ===
Coach: Teva Zaveroni

No.	Pos.	Player	Date of birth (age)	Club
1	GK	Jonathan Torohia	22 February 1985 (aged 38)	(French Polynesia) Tatutu
2	FW	Roonui Tinirauarii	14 March 1997 (aged 26)	(French Polynesia) Dragon
3	DF	Tamatoa Tetauira	17 March 1996 (aged 27)	Unattached
4	DF	Heimanu Taiarui	24 August 1986 (aged 37)	(French Polynesia) Pirae
5	MF	Gervais Chan-Kat	16 November 1992 (aged 31)	(French Polynesia) Arue
6	MF	Patrick Tepa	28 May 1989 (aged 34)	(French Polynesia) Pirae
7	MF	Raimana Li Fung Kuee	10 April 1985 (aged 38)	(French Polynesia) Pirae
8	MF	Heiarii Tavanae	15 February 1992 (aged 32)	(French Polynesia) Venus
9	MF	Heirauarii Salem	23 April 1998 (aged 25)	(French Polynesia) Pirae
10	FW	Tearii Labaste	19 July 1991 (aged 32)	(French Polynesia) Pirae
11	FW	Teaonui Tehau	1 September 1992 (aged 31)	(French Polynesia) Venus
12	GK	Teave Teamotuaitau	17 April 1992 (aged 31)	(French Polynesia) Tefana

=== Argentina ===
Coach: Herman Magrini

No.	Pos.	Player	Date of birth (age)	Club
1	GK	Sebastián Gomez Polatti	12 April 1989 (aged 34)	(Argentina) Acassuso
2	DF	Lucas Medero	13 January 1990 (aged 34)	(Argentina) Acassuso
3	DF	Emanuel De Sosa	24 March 1989 (aged 34)	(Argentina) Acassuso
4	DF	Axel Rutterschmidt	12 April 1997 (aged 26)	(Argentina) Acassuso
5	DF	Nahuel Cipolletta	14 June 2000 (aged 23)	(Argentina) Argentino De Rosario
6	DF	Manuel Pomar	29 January 1999 (aged 25)	(Argentina) Argentino De Rosario
7	MF	Luciano Sirico	7 July 1992 (aged 31)	(Argentina) Acassuso
8	MF	Lautaro Benaducci	9 March 1993 (aged 30)	(Argentina) Acassuso
9	FW	Emiliano Holmedilla	21 December 1988 (aged 35)	(Argentina) Racing Club
10	FW	Lucas Ponzetti	29 June 1999 (aged 24)	(Argentina) Argentino De Rosario
11	MF	Nahuel Gigena	6 May 1999 (aged 24)	(Argentina) Argentino De Rosario
12	GK	Mariano Mansilla	18 June 1985 (aged 38)	(Argentina) Racing Club

== Group C ==
=== Senegal ===
Coach: Mamadou Diallo

No.	Pos.	Player	Date of birth (age)	Club
1	GK	Al Seyni Ndiaye	31 December 1989 (aged 34)	(Senegal) Vison Sport
2	DF	Ninou Diatta	5 October 1987 (aged 36)	(Senegal) Golf Beach Club
3	DF	Papa Ndoye	9 September 1985 (aged 38)	(Senegal) Ngor Almadies
4	DF	Seydina Gadiaga	10 June 2003 (aged 20)	(Senegal) Malika
5	DF	Mamadou Sylla	22 February 1986 (aged 37)	(Senegal) YOFF Dakar
6	MF	Amar Samb	14 August 1999 (aged 24)	(Senegal) Ngor Almadies
7	MF	Babacar Fall	5 March 1989 (aged 34)	(Senegal) Yeumbeul
8	FW	Mandione Diagne	27 July 2002 (aged 21)	(Senegal) YOFF Dakar
9	FW	Raoul Mendy	30 December 1992 (aged 31)	(Senegal) Mamelles Dakar
10	MF	Mamour Diagne	4 October 1990 (aged 33)	(Senegal) Ngor Almadies
11	MF	Seydina Sene	10 February 2001 (aged 23)	(Senegal) Malika
12	GK	Ousseynou Faye	4 February 2005 (aged 19)	(Senegal) Ngor Almadies

=== Belarus ===
Coach: (Spain) Nico Alvarado

No.	Pos.	Player	Date of birth (age)	Club
1	GK	Uladzimir Ustsinovich	27 February 1999 (aged 24)	(Belarus) TSOR-Masita
2	DF	Vadzim Bokach	25 January 1984 (aged 40)	(Belarus) TSOR-Masita
3	DF	Ivan Kanstantsinau	8 July 1989 (aged 34)	(Belarus) TSOR-Masita
4	FW	Artsemi Drozd	13 January 1996 (aged 28)	(Belarus) TSOR-Masita
5	FW	Aleh Hapon	11 September 1996 (aged 27)	(Russia) Kristall
6	DF	Yury Piatrouski	6 May 1994 (aged 29)	(Belarus) TSOR-Masita
7	DF	Yauheni Novikau	15 November 1993 (aged 30)	(Belarus) TSOR-Masita
8	FW	Ihar Bryshtsel	13 July 1987 (aged 36)	(Russia) Kristall
9	FW	Yahor Hardzetski	9 February 1996 (aged 28)	(Russia) CSKA Moscow
10	FW	Anatoliy Ryabko	9 October 1989 (aged 34)	(Russia) Spartak Moscow
11	DF	Mikita Chaikouski	21 May 1998 (aged 25)	(Russia) Lokomotiv Moscow
12	GK	Mikhail Avgustov	31 July 1996 (aged 27)	(Russia) Krylya Sovetov

=== Colombia ===
Coach: Santiago Alzate

No.	Pos.	Player	Date of birth (age)	Club
1	GK	Emanuel Londoño	13 January 1999 (aged 25)	(Colombia) Antioquia
2	FW	Wilson Cordoba	28 April 1995 (aged 28)	(Colombia) Antioquia
3	DF	Wilmar Donado	9 July 1999 (aged 24)	(Colombia) Antioquia
4	FW	Edward Bonilla	20 August 1995 (aged 28)	(Colombia) San Martín
5	DF	Edu Lopez	12 August 1995 (aged 28)	(Colombia) Antioquia
6	DF	Kevin Clavijo	5 March 2000 (aged 23)	(Colombia) Alianza Tolima
7	MF	Rafa Acosta	16 September 1999 (aged 24)	(Colombia) Antioquia
8	FW	Julio Pantoja	13 February 1998 (aged 26)	(Colombia) Caribbean Sun
9	FW	Victor Morales	13 August 1992 (aged 31)	(Colombia) Utrahuilca-Coomotor
10	MF	Juan Ossa	4 October 1995 (aged 28)	(Colombia) Antioquia
11	MF	Esleider Avila	6 December 2000 (aged 23)	(Colombia) Caribbean Sun
12	GK	Alejo Quintero	4 May 1994 (aged 29)	(Colombia) Antioquia

=== Japan ===
Coach: Teruki Tabata

Note: Teruki Tabata is coach per FIFA; Ozu Moreira is player-coach per the Japan Football Association, whilst Tabata is listed as assistant coach.

No.	Pos.	Player	Date of birth (age)	Club
1	GK	Yusuke Kawai	6 May 1988 (aged 35)	(Japan) Tokyo Verdy
2	MF	Ryunosuke Miyama	6 September 1994 (aged 29)	(Japan) Tokyo Verdy
3	MF	Yuki Kibune	27 October 1993 (aged 30)	(Japan) Averdade Kumamoto
4	DF	Kosuke Matsuda	26 September 1986 (aged 37)	(Japan) Loewe Yokohama
5	FW	Rikuto Otani	22 September 2003 (aged 20)	(Japan) Loewe Yokohama
6	FW	Takuya Akaguma	21 November 1989 (aged 34)	(Japan) Laso Apego Kitakyushu
7	MF	Takaaki Oba	24 December 1992 (aged 31)	(Japan) Loewe Yokohama
8	MF	Naoya Matsuo	18 August 1988 (aged 35)	(Japan) Averdade Kumamoto
9	FW	Takahito Yamada	4 January 1996 (aged 28)	(Japan) Tokyo Verdy
10	DF	Ozu Moreira	21 January 1986 (aged 38)	(Japan) Tokyo Verdy
11	MF	Takumi Uesato	29 April 1990 (aged 33)	(Japan) Tokyo Verdy
12	GK	Takeru Furusato	18 January 2001 (aged 23)	(Japan) Loewe Yokohama

== Group D ==
=== Brazil ===
Coach: Marco Octávio

No.	Pos.	Player	Date of birth (age)	Caps	Goals	Club
1	GK	Teleco	7 September 1999 (aged 24)	32	1	(Brazil) Náutico Capibaribe
2	FW	Zé Lucas	5 June 1990 (aged 33)	67	80	(Brazil) Sampaio Corrêa
3	FW	Alisson	23 April 2001 (aged 22)	22	8	(Brazil) Sampaio Corrêa
4	FW	Catarino	9 January 1990 (aged 34)	107	88	(Brazil) Vasco da Gama
5	DF	Filipe Silva	12 September 1993 (aged 30)	115	86	(Brazil) Sport Recife
6	DF	Brendo	11 February 1996 (aged 28)	42	26	(Brazil) Anchieta
7	FW	Edson Hulk	8 March 1994 (aged 29)	55	76	(Brazil) Sampaio Corrêa
8	DF	Bruno Xavier	15 August 1984 (aged 39)	149	206	(Brazil) CTM
9	FW	Rodrigo	16 August 1993 (aged 30)	122	174	(Brazil) Botafogo
10	DF	Datinha	12 April 1988 (aged 35)	170	120	(Brazil) Sampaio Corrêa
11	FW	Mauricinho	9 December 1989 (aged 34)	139	166	(Brazil) Vasco da Gama
12	GK	Tiago Bobô	14 June 1991 (aged 32)	36	5	(Brazil) Sampaio Corrêa

=== Oman ===
Coach: Talib Al Thanawi

No.	Pos.	Player	Date of birth (age)	Club
1	GK	Said Al Farsi	31 January 1988 (aged 36)	(Oman) Al Seeb Club
2	FW	Abdullah Al Sauti	10 August 1993 (aged 30)	(Oman) Quriyat Club
3	FW	Musallam Al Araimi	1 October 2004 (aged 19)	(Oman) Sur
4	MF	Yahya Al Muraiki	13 January 1998 (aged 26)	(Oman) Saham Club
5	DF	Mandhar Al Araimi	22 May 1984 (aged 39)	(Oman) Al Oruba
6	DF	Abdulrahman Al Fazari	12 May 1997 (aged 26)	(Oman) Saham Club
7	FW	Yaqdhan Al Hindasi	24 June 2000 (aged 23)	(Oman) Al Seeb Club
8	MF	Nooh Al Zadjali	10 August 1991 (aged 32)	(Oman) Al Mussannah
9	MF	Ahmed Al Owaisi	20 July 1998 (aged 25)	(Oman) Al Mussannah
10	FW	Khalid Al Oraimi	17 March 1992 (aged 31)	(Oman) Al Seeb Club
11	MF	Salim Al Oraimi	30 March 1997 (aged 26)	(Oman) Al Oruba
12	GK	Younis Al Owaisi	29 January 1993 (aged 31)	(Oman) Al Shabab Club

=== Portugal ===
Coach: Mário Narciso

Rui Coimbra was unavailable for selection for a second consecutive World Cup, this time due to recovery from a detached retina.

The squad did not contain at least one of the legendary trio of Alan, Madjer or Belchior for the first time since the 1997 World Championships, making this just the second of the 19 times Portugal have appeared at a world cup of beach soccer that this is the case.

No.	Pos.	Player	Date of birth (age)	Caps	Goals	Club
1	GK	Pedro Mano	19 February 1996 (aged 27)	23	8	(Portugal) Braga
2	DF	Bernardo Lopes	14 March 1997 (aged 26)	50	11	(Portugal) O Sotão
3	DF	André Lourênço	20 September 1995 (aged 28)	101	46	(Portugal) Braga
4	DF	Bruno Torres	21 April 1980 (aged 43)	277	56	(Portugal) Braga
5	MF	Jordan Santos	2 July 1991 (aged 32)	234	209	(Portugal) Braga
6	MF	Rodrigo Pinhal	10 February 1998 (aged 26)	65	12	(Portugal) Nacional
7	MF	Rúben Brilhante	1 December 2000 (aged 23)	91	27	(Portugal) Braga
8	MF	Duarte Algarvio	7 September 2000 (aged 23)	29	13	(Portugal) Braga
9	FW	Miguel Pintado	5 February 1993 (aged 31)	64	44	(Portugal) Braga
10	MF	Bê Martins	29 December 1989 (aged 34)	179	151	(Portugal) Braga
11	FW	Léo Martins	29 December 1989 (aged 34)	174	226	(Portugal) Braga
12	GK	Rúben Regufe	16 July 1990 (aged 33)	34	1	(Portugal) Leixoes

=== Mexico ===
Coach: Francisco Cati

No.	Pos.	Player	Date of birth (age)	Club
1	GK	Gabriel Macias	19 October 1991 (aged 32)	Unattached
2	MF	Héctor Acevedo	16 March 1992 (aged 31)	Unattached
3	DF	Salomón Wbias	9 March 1996 (aged 27)	Unattached
4	DF	Edgar Portilla	29 March 1995 (aged 28)	(Argentina) Boca Juniors
5	MF	Pabel Montes	26 August 1996 (aged 27)	Unattached
6	MF	Alejandro García	21 February 1992 (aged 31)	Unattached
7	FW	Diego Martínez	22 September 1988 (aged 35)	Unattached
8	MF	Enoch Lopez	30 September 1993 (aged 30)	Unattached
9	FW	Cristofher Castillo	7 December 1991 (aged 32)	Unattached
10	MF	José Vizcarra	21 December 1990 (aged 33)	Unattached
11	FW	Ramón Maldonado	25 April 1988 (aged 35)	Unattached
12	GK	Jeancob Ramirez	11 November 2000 (aged 23)	Unattached

== Statistics ==
Overall, 192 players have travelled to the United Arab Emirates to compete in the tournament. The average age of all players is 30.2 years.

Fourteen of the sixteen managers are managing their own nation's national team whilst two manage a foreign team in respect to their own nationality.

Youngest v oldest player

	Name	Nation	Date of birth (age)	Age difference
Youngest player	Ousseynou Faye	Senegal	4 February 2005 (aged 19)	24 years 9 months 15 days
Oldest player	Bruno Torres	Portugal	21 April 1980 (aged 43)	24 years 9 months 15 days

Tallest v shortest player

	Name	Nation	Height metric (imperial)	Height difference
Tallest player	Anatoliy Ryabko	Belarus	1.97 m (6 ft 5 1/2 in)	0.38 m (1 ft 3 in)
Shortest player	Mohamed Loha	Egypt	1.59 m (5 ft 2 1/2 in)	0.38 m (1 ft 3 in)

Average age of squads

Average age	Nation(s)
26	Colombia
27	—
28	—
29	Italy; Oman; Senegal; Spain
30	Argentina; Belarus; Iran; Mexico; Portugal
31	Brazil; Japan; United States
32	Tahiti
33	Egypt
34	United Arab Emirates

Players by age category

Age category	No. of players
≤23	21
24–28	53
29–33	59
34–38	49
≥39	10

== See also ==
- 2024 FIFA Futsal World Cup squads
