= 1998 OFC Nations Cup squads =

The 1998 OFC Nations Cup was an international football tournament that was held in Brisbane, Queensland, Australia from 25 September to 4 October 1998. The 6 national teams involved in the tournament were required to register a squad of players; only players in these squads were eligible to take part in the tournament. The 1998 Melanesia Cup and the 1998 Polynesia Cup were used to find the four qualifiers for the finals tournament (Fiji and Vanuatu from Melanesia and Tahiti and Cook Islands from Polynesia respectively), to move on and join Australia and New Zealand at the main tournament.

Players marked (c) were named as captain for their national squad. Players' club teams and players' age are as of 25 September 1998 – the tournament's opening day.

== Squad lists ==
=== Australia ===
Coach: (Argentina) Raul Blanco

No.	Pos.	Player	Date of birth (age)	Caps	Club
1	GK	Jason Petkovic	7 December 1972 (aged 25)		(Australia) Adelaide City
2	DF	Robert Trajkovski	24 July 1972 (aged 26)		(Australia) Perth Glory
3	DF	Fausto De Amicis	26 June 1968 (aged 30)		(Australia) South Melbourne
4	DF	Glenn Gwynne	22 February 1972 (aged 26)		(Australia) Brisbane Strikers
5	DF	Alex Tobin (c)	3 November 1965 (aged 32)		(Australia) Adelaide City
6	DF	Mark Babic	24 April 1973 (aged 25)		(Australia) Marconi Stallions
7	MF	Ernie Tapai	14 February 1967 (aged 31)		(Australia) Perth Glory
8	MF	Troy Halpin	17 August 1973 (aged 25)		(Australia) Perth Glory
9	FW	Damian Mori	30 September 1970 (aged 27)		(Australia) Adelaide City
10	FW	Paul Trimboli	25 February 1969 (aged 29)		(Australia) South Melbourne
11	FW	Carl Veart	21 May 1970 (aged 28)		(Australia) Adelaide City
12	DF	Simon Colosimo	8 January 1979 (aged 19)		(Australia) Carlton SC
13	DF	Alvin Ceccoli	5 August 1974 (aged 24)		(Australia) Wollongong Wolves
14	MF	Goran Lozanovski	11 January 1974 (aged 24)		(Australia) South Melbourne
15	DF	Dominic Longo	23 August 1970 (aged 28)		(Australia) Marconi Stallions
16	MF	Kasey Wehrman	16 August 1977 (aged 21)		(Australia) Brisbane Strikers
17	FW	Kris Trajanovski	19 February 1972 (aged 26)		(Australia) Marconi Stallions
18	GK	Michael Petkovic	16 July 1976 (aged 22)		(Australia) South Melbourne
19	MF	Brad Maloney	19 January 1972 (aged 26)		(Australia) Marconi Stallions
20	MF	Scott Chipperfield	30 December 1975 (aged 22)		(Australia) Wollongong Wolves

=== Cook Islands ===
Coach: Alex Napa

No.	Pos.	Player	Date of birth (age)	Caps	Club
20	GK	Vailoa Tiere	11 April 1974 (aged 24)		(Cook Islands) Titikaveka FC
	GK	Jimmy Katoa	26 April 1980 (aged 18)		(Cook Islands) Avatiu
	DF	Tristram Chambers	7 January 1971 (aged 27)		(Cook Islands) Tupapa Maraerenga
	DF	Heath Dickenson	2 February 1968 (aged 30)		(New Zealand) University-Mount Wellington
	DF	Edward Drollett	7 June 1975 (aged 23)		(Cook Islands) Tupapa Maraerenga
	DF	James Nand	6 April 1977 (aged 21)		(Cook Islands) Tupapa Maraerenga
	DF	John Pareanga	2 October 1980 (aged 17)		(Cook Islands) Matavera
	DF	Dean Tereu	9 July 1972 (aged 26)		(Cook Islands) Titikaveka FC
	MF	Stenter Mani	14 September 1978 (aged 20)		(Australia) Seaford United
	MF	Teremaki Paniani	20 February 1975 (aged 23)		(Cook Islands) Nikao Sokattak
	MF	Christian Tauira	6 July 1981 (aged 17)		(Cook Islands) Avatiu
	FW	Joseph Chambers	15 April 1976 (aged 22)		(Cook Islands) Tupapa Maraerenga
	FW	Junior Puroku	26 January 1981 (aged 17)		(Cook Islands) Puaikura
	FW	Nikorima Te Miha	1 January 1980 (aged 18)		(Cook Islands) Puaikura

=== Fiji ===
Coach: Billy Singh

No.	Pos.	Player	Date of birth (age)	Caps	Club
	GK	Isikeli Sevanaia	10 January 1969 (aged 29)		(Fiji) Suva
	GK	Laisenia Tuba	13 August 1978 (aged 20)		(Fiji) Ba
	DF	Pita Rabo	30 July 1977 (aged 21)		(Fiji) Rewa
	DF	Imtiaz Khan	25 July 1976 (aged 22)		(Fiji) Suva
	DF	Manoa Masi	18 August 1974 (aged 24)		(Fiji) Nadroga
	DF	Luke Nabaro	Unknown		(Fiji) Ba
	DF	Valerio Nasema	19 July 1972 (aged 26)		(Fiji) Ba
	MF	Emosi Baleinuku	2 April 1975 (aged 23)		(Fiji) Nadi
	MF	Ratu Debalevu	22 May 1966 (aged 32)		(Fiji) Suva
	MF	Shailemdra Lal	30 September 1972 (aged 25)		(Fiji) Suva
	MF	Ulaisi Seruvatu	23 March 1964 (aged 34)		(Fiji) Ba
	MF	Malakai Waqa	8 May 1975 (aged 23)		(Fiji) Lautoka
	FW	Alivate Driu	28 December 1974 (aged 23)		(Fiji) Nadi
	FW	Kameli Kilaiwaca	23 June 1974 (aged 24)		(Fiji) Suva
	FW	Salesh Kumar	28 July 1981 (aged 17)		(Fiji) Lautoka
	FW	Esala Masi	9 March 1974 (aged 24)		(Australia) Wollongong Wolves
	FW	Waisea Nabenu	12 December 1974 (aged 23)		(Fiji) Ba
	FW	Marika Namaga	18 January 1974 (aged 24)		(Fiji) Nadi

=== New Zealand ===
Coach: (England) Ken Dugdale

No.	Pos.	Player	Date of birth (age)	Caps	Club
1	GK	Jason Batty (c)	23 March 1971 (aged 27)		(Republic of Ireland) Bohemians
2	DF	Chris Zoricich	3 May 1969 (aged 29)		(Australia) Brisbane Strikers
3	DF	Sean Douglas	8 May 1972 (aged 26)		(Australia) Carlton SC
4	DF	Che Bunce	29 August 1975 (aged 23)		(Iceland) Breiðablik
5	DF	Jonathan Perry	22 November 1975 (aged 22)		(England) Barnsley
6	DF	Gavin Wilkinson	5 November 1973 (aged 24)		(Australia) Perth Glory
7	MF	Mark Burton	18 May 1974 (aged 24)		(Germany) Kickers Emden
8	MF	Aaran Lines	21 December 1976 (aged 21)		(Germany) Kickers Emden
9	FW	Rupert Ryan	25 February 1974 (aged 24)		(New Zealand) Napier City Rovers
10	MF	Chris Jackson	18 July 1970 (aged 28)		(Singapore) Gombak United
11	MF	Harry Ngata	24 August 1971 (aged 27)		(Republic of Ireland) Bohemians
12	MF	Mark Atkinson	16 February 1970 (aged 28)		(Australia) Carlton SC
13	FW	Paul Urlovic	21 November 1978 (aged 19)		(New Zealand) Central United
14	DF	Danny Hay	15 May 1975 (aged 23)		(Australia) Perth Glory
15	DF	Ivan Vicelich	3 September 1976 (aged 22)		(New Zealand) Central United
16	FW	Vaughan Coveny	13 December 1971 (aged 26)		(Australia) South Melbourne
17	MF	Tinoi Christie	29 February 1976 (aged 22)		(New Zealand) Napier City Rovers
20	GK	Ross Nicholson	8 August 1975 (aged 23)		(New Zealand) Central United

=== Tahiti ===
Coach: Alain Rousseau and Eddy Rousseau

No.	Pos.	Player	Date of birth (age)	Caps	Club
	GK	Patrick Jacquemet	10 November 1965 (aged 32)		(French Polynesia) AS Vénus
	GK	Daniel Tapeta	25 October 1974 (aged 23)		(French Polynesia) AS Manu-Ura
	DF	Eric Etaeta	2 March 1969 (aged 29)		(French Polynesia) AS Central Sport
	DF	Steve Fatupua-Lecaill	12 January 1976 (aged 22)		(French Polynesia) AS Vénus
	DF	Rex Faura	26 April 1971 (aged 27)		(French Polynesia) AS Manu-Ura
	DF	Benoît Michelena	1 August 1974 (aged 24)		(Australia) Wollongong Wolves
	DF	Heimana Paama	1 September 1975 (aged 23)		(French Polynesia) AS Pirae
	DF	Christian Taiarui			(French Polynesia) AS Tefana
	MF	Bruno Beramelli			(French Polynesia) AS Manu-Ura
	MF	Sylvain Booene	31 January 1968 (aged 30)		(French Polynesia) AS Vénus
	MF	Samuel Garcia	2 October 1975 (aged 22)		(French Polynesia) AS Vénus
	MF	Rupena Raumati			(French Polynesia) AS Dragon
	MF	Jean-Loup Rousseau	27 March 1970 (aged 28)		(French Polynesia) AS Vénus
	MF	Teva Zaveroni	10 October 1975 (aged 22)		(French Polynesia) AS Pirae
	FW	Harold Amaru	23 April 1974 (aged 24)		(French Polynesia) AS Pirae
	FW	Meheannu Gartien			(French Polynesia) AS Vénus
	FW	Hiro Labaste	5 January 1973 (aged 25)		(French Polynesia) AS Tamarii
	FW	Gerald Quennet	8 August 1975 (aged 23)		(Australia) Wollongong Wolves

=== Vanuatu ===
Coach: Alwyn Job

No.	Pos.	Player	Date of birth (age)	Caps	Club
	GK	David Chilia	10 June 1978 (aged 20)		(Vanuatu) Tupuji Imere
	GK	Samson Lini			(Vanuatu) Blackbeach
	DF	Atu Kalopong			(Vanuatu) Tupuji Imere
	DF	Pita Kalotang	6 June 1975 (aged 23)		(Vanuatu) Tupuji Imere
	DF	Tom Manses	9 November 1978 (aged 19)		(Vanuatu) Tafea FC
	DF	Nicholas Bruno	26 March 1973 (aged 25)		(Vanuatu) Rocky FC
	DF	Hubert Reuben	11 November 1974 (aged 23)		(Vanuatu) Rainbow FC
	DF	Silvain Tabirap			(Vanuatu) Rainbow FC
	MF	Reginald Garo			(Vanuatu) Rocky FC
	MF	Gérard Maki Haitong	6 July 1978 (aged 20)		(Vanuatu) Tafea FC
	MF	Antonio Malapa	9 May 1974 (aged 24)		(Vanuatu) Nipikinamu FC
	MF	Edwin Rarai	27 March 1969 (aged 29)		(Vanuatu) Tafea FC
	MF	Norman Tangis			(Vanuatu) Rainbow FC
	MF	Georgino Tura			(Vanuatu) Nipikinamu FC
	MF	Abel Zarachie			(Vanuatu) Rocky FC
	FW	Shem Batick			(Vanuatu) Atsal FC
	FW	Etienne Mermer	26 January 1977 (aged 21)		(Vanuatu) Nipikinamu FC
	FW	Peter Roronamahava			(Vanuatu) Rainbow FC
