= 2025 FIFA Beach Soccer World Cup squads =

List of players featuring at the 2025 FIFA Beach Soccer World Cup

The 2025 FIFA Beach Soccer World Cup was an international beach soccer tournament held in Seychelles from 1 to 11 May 2025. The sixteen national teams involved in the tournament were required by FIFA to register a squad of twelve players, including two goalkeepers.

This article lists the national beach soccer squads that took part in the tournament. Only the players listed in these squads below are eligible to take part in the tournament, which were revealed in full on 15 April 2025.

The age listed for each player is as on 1 May 2025, the first day of the tournament and the names of the players shown are, in most circumstances, that of the FIFA Display Names listed on the official squad document issued by FIFA.

== Group A ==
=== Seychelles ===
Coach: Herald Knowlessur

No.	Pos.	Player	Date of birth (age)	Club
1	GK	Damien Adela	6 November 1985 (aged 39)	(Seychelles) One Stone
2	DF	Herrode Prosper	6 November 1993 (aged 31)	(Seychelles) One Stone
3	DF	Rondy Onezime	15 July 1988 (aged 36)	(England) Portsmouth
4	DF	Mike Balette	13 March 1990 (aged 35)	(Seychelles) Equator
5	DF	Lienal Bibi	19 August 2008 (aged 16)	(Seychelles) La Passe
6	FW	Wayne Sarah	2 October 2002 (aged 22)	(Seychelles) Skychef
7	FW	Terrence Amade	21 June 1990 (aged 34)	(Seychelles) Equator
8	DF	Brandon Labrosse	11 March 1999 (aged 26)	(Seychelles) Forester
9	DF	Ryan Servina	27 July 1995 (aged 29)	(Seychelles) One Stone
10	DF	Remy De Ketelaere	21 April 1996 (aged 29)	(Seychelles) Equator
11	FW	Martin William	22 July 1991 (aged 33)	(Seychelles) One Stone
12	GK	Dominic Bouchereau	10 September 1998 (aged 26)	(Seychelles) Equator

=== Belarus ===
Coach: (Spain) Nico Alvarado

No.	Pos.	Player	Date of birth (age)	Club
1	GK	Uladzimir Ustsinovich	27 February 1999 (aged 26)	(Belarus) TSOR-Masita
2	DF	Vadzim Bokach	25 January 1984 (aged 41)	(Belarus) TSOR-Masita
3	DF	Ivan Kanstantsinau	8 July 1989 (aged 35)	(Belarus) TSOR-Masita
4	FW	Artsemi Drozd	13 January 1996 (aged 29)	(Belarus) TSOR-Masita
5	DF	Mikita Chaikouski	21 May 1998 (aged 26)	(Russia) Lokomotiv Moscow
6	DF	Yury Piatrouski	6 May 1994 (aged 30)	(Russia) CSKA Moscow
7	DF	Yauheni Novikau	15 November 1993 (aged 31)	(Belarus) TSOR-Masita
8	FW	Ihar Bryshtel	13 July 1987 (aged 37)	(Russia) Kristall
9	FW	Yahor Hardzetski	9 February 1996 (aged 29)	(Russia) CSKA Moscow
10	FW	Anatoliy Ryabko	9 October 1989 (aged 35)	(Russia) Spartak Moscow
11	FW	Aleh Hapon	11 September 1996 (aged 28)	(Russia) Kristall
12	GK	Mikhail Avgustov	31 July 1996 (aged 28)	(Russia) Krylia Sovetov

=== Guatemala ===
Coach: Farley Castro

No.	Pos.	Player	Date of birth (age)	Club
1	GK	Hendrick Córdova	4 July 1991 (aged 33)	(Guatemala) Pioneros FP
2	FW	Luis Lopez	13 December 2002 (aged 22)	(Guatemala) Piratas FP
3	MF	Erick Montepeque	10 December 2002 (aged 22)	(Guatemala) Villas Del Milagro
4	MF	Jose Lem	3 February 1990 (aged 35)	(Guatemala) Pioneros FP
5	MF	Edwin Lopez	10 January 1999 (aged 26)	(Guatemala) Pioneros FP
6	MF	William Álvarez	1 November 1996 (aged 28)	(Guatemala) Pioneros FP
7	MF	Berny Marroquín	8 August 2001 (aged 23)	(Guatemala) Pioneros FP
8	DF	Samuel Pérez	8 February 1982 (aged 43)	(Guatemala) Pioneros FP
9	MF	Miguel González	20 October 1992 (aged 32)	(Guatemala) Pioneros FP
10	MF	Pablo Crocker	13 June 1989 (aged 35)	(Guatemala) Pioneros FP
11	MF	Christopher González	27 August 1997 (aged 27)	(Guatemala) Cuervos 1927
12	GK	Anderson Crespo	6 June 1998 (aged 26)	(Guatemala) Pioneros FP

=== Japan ===
Coach: Teruki Tabata

No.	Pos.	Player	Date of birth (age)	Club
1	GK	Yusuke Kawai	6 May 1988 (aged 36)	(Japan) Tokyo Verdy
2	FW	Masato Ota	19 February 1996 (aged 29)	(Japan) Averdade Kumamoto
3	DF	Ken Matsumoto	28 August 1987 (aged 37)	(Japan) Loewe Yokohama
4	DF	Kosuke Matsuda	26 September 1986 (aged 38)	(Japan) Loewe Yokohama
5	DF	Ryota Tsuboya	17 June 1994 (aged 30)	(Japan) Sol Mar Praia
6	FW	Takuya Akaguma	21 November 1989 (aged 35)	(Japan) Laso Apego Kitakyushu
7	MF	Takaaki Oba	24 December 1992 (aged 32)	(Japan) Loewe Yokohama
8	MF	Takumi Uesato	29 April 1990 (aged 35)	(Japan) Tokyo Verdy
9	FW	Masato Suzuki	8 June 1991 (aged 33)	(Japan) Veertien Mie
10	DF	Ozu Moreira	21 January 1986 (aged 39)	(Japan) Tokyo Verdy
11	MF	Chikara Eguro	27 March 1996 (aged 29)	(Japan) Sol Mar Praia
12	GK	Takeru Furusato	18 January 2001 (aged 24)	(Japan) Loewe Yokohama

== Group B ==
=== Mauritania ===
Coach: Moussa Baghayoko

No.	Pos.	Player	Date of birth (age)	Club
1	GK	Hacen Abeidi	1 December 2000 (aged 24)	(Mauritania) AS Vallee
2	DF	Ahmedou Bilal	16 January 2000 (aged 25)	(Mauritania) Chemal FC
3	DF	Mohamed Diallo	14 January 1997 (aged 28)	(Morocco) Olympic Sirghini
4	DF	El Bechir El Id	13 March 2000 (aged 25)	(Mauritania) Chemal FC
5	DF	Mahmoud Samba	10 January 2000 (aged 25)	(Mauritania) AS Riyad
6	MF	Hamdy Salem	20 June 1998 (aged 26)	(Mauritania) FC Arafat
7	FW	Cheikh Belkheir	7 December 2004 (aged 20)	(Morocco) IRT Tanger
8	FW	Bidjati Malick	14 July 1996 (aged 28)	(Mauritania) FC Tensoueilim
9	MF	Abdel Aziz Diop	3 April 2002 (aged 23)	(Mauritania) Inter Nouakchott
10	MF	El Hadj Niang	2 December 1991 (aged 33)	(Mauritania) ASAC Concorde
11	FW	Mohamedou Ely	15 August 2003 (aged 21)	(Mauritania) Chemal FC
12	GK	Abdoul Latif Sy	11 December 1998 (aged 26)	(Mauritania) AS Vallee

=== Iran ===
Coach: Ali Naderi

No.	Pos.	Player	Date of birth (age)	Club
1	GK	Seyed Mirjalili	5 July 1999 (aged 25)	(Iran) Chadormalu Ardakan
2	DF	Abbas Rezaei	8 July 1992 (aged 32)	(Iran) Chadormalu Ardakan
3	DF	Reza Amiri	19 March 1997 (aged 28)	(Iran) Foolad Hormozgan
4	DF	Saeid Piramoun	2 February 1995 (aged 30)	(Iran) Pars Jonoobi
5	DF	Ali Nazem	14 April 1993 (aged 32)	(Iran) Moghavemat Golsa Poosh
6	FW	Mahdi Shir	28 March 1995 (aged 30)	(Iran) Chadormalu Ardakan
7	FW	Ali Mirshekari	24 February 1997 (aged 28)	(Iran) Foolad Hormozgan
8	DF	Movahed Mohammadpour	7 January 1995 (aged 30)	(Iran) Foolad Hormozgan
9	FW	Mohammadali Mokhtari	4 July 1990 (aged 34)	(Iran) Chadormalu Ardakan
10	FW	Mohammadali Nazarzadeh	29 November 1999 (aged 25)	(Iran) Pars Jonoobi
11	FW	Mohammad Masoumi	26 February 1997 (aged 28)	(Iran) Moghavemat Golsa Poosh
12	GK	Seyedmohammad Dastan	4 December 1996 (aged 28)	(Iran) Moghavemat Golsa Poosh

=== Portugal ===
Coach: Mário Narciso

No.	Pos.	Player	Date of birth (age)	Club
1	GK	Pedro Mano	19 February 1996 (aged 29)	(Portugal) Buarcos 2017
2	DF	Rui Coimbra	14 April 1986 (aged 39)	(Portugal) O Sotão
3	DF	André Lourenço	20 September 1995 (aged 29)	(Portugal) Buarcos 2017
4	DF	Bernardo Lopes	14 March 1997 (aged 28)	(Portugal) O Sotão
5	MF	Jordan Santos	2 July 1991 (aged 33)	(Portugal) O Sotão
6	MF	Rodrigo Pinhal	10 February 1998 (aged 27)	(Portugal) Alfarim
7	MF	Rúben Brilhante	1 December 2000 (aged 24)	(Portugal) O Sotão
8	FW	Filipe Tim	17 November 2004 (aged 20)	(Portugal) Vila Flor
9	FW	Miguel Pintado	5 February 1993 (aged 32)	(Portugal) Buarcos 2017
10	MF	Bê Martins	29 December 1989 (aged 35)	(Portugal) Buarcos 2017
11	FW	Léo Martins	29 December 1989 (aged 35)	(Portugal) Buarcos 2017
12	GK	Rúben Regufe	16 July 1990 (aged 34)	(Portugal) Leixões

=== Paraguay ===
Coach: Joaquin Molas

No.	Pos.	Player	Date of birth (age)	Club
1	GK	Carlos Ovelár	30 August 1998 (aged 26)	(Paraguay) 24 De Setiembre
2	MF	Sixto Cantero	4 September 1997 (aged 27)	(Paraguay) Club Sportivo Luqueño
3	FW	Thiago Barrios	4 August 2006 (aged 18)	(Paraguay) Club Sportivo Luqueño
4	MF	Jhovanny Benítez	24 July 1999 (aged 25)	(Paraguay) Club Sportivo Luqueño
5	DF	Jesús Rolón	30 November 1990 (aged 34)	(Paraguay) Club Sportivo Luqueño
6	MF	Pedro Morán	9 June 1990 (aged 34)	(Paraguay) San Antonio
7	MF	Milciades Medina	16 February 2003 (aged 22)	(Paraguay) 24 De Setiembre
8	FW	Carlos Carballo	31 January 1993 (aged 32)	(Paraguay) 24 De Setiembre
9	FW	Néstor Medina	10 April 1998 (aged 27)	(Paraguay) San Antonio
10	FW	Valentín Benítez	20 January 1999 (aged 26)	(Paraguay) Club Sportivo Luqueño
11	DF	Mathías Martínez	24 December 1997 (aged 27)	(Paraguay) 24 De Setiembre
12	GK	Yoao Rolón	23 August 1996 (aged 28)	(Paraguay) Club Sportivo Luqueño

== Group C ==
=== Spain ===
Coach: Cristian Mendez

No.	Pos.	Player	Date of birth (age)	Club
1	GK	Pablo López	11 December 1998 (aged 26)	(Spain) Mazarron
2	DF	José Oliver	23 March 2003 (aged 22)	(Spain) Levante
3	DF	Antonio Mayor	20 April 1983 (aged 42)	(Spain) Malaga
4	DF	Miguel Gatica	25 March 2005 (aged 20)	(Spain) Cádiz
5	FW	David Ardil	11 January 1999 (aged 26)	(Spain) Malaga
6	FW	Riduan El Bassri	22 February 2002 (aged 23)	(Spain) Roses
7	DF	Roberto Galindo	30 December 2005 (aged 19)	(Spain) Malaga
8	FW	Ramy Saghdani	24 December 2006 (aged 18)	(Spain) Malaga
9	FW	Soleiman Batis	15 August 2002 (aged 22)	(Spain) Levante
10	DF	Kuman	14 September 1991 (aged 33)	(Spain) Levante
11	FW	Chiky Ardil	17 April 1988 (aged 37)	(Spain) Melistar
12	GK	Juanmi	17 January 2000 (aged 25)	(Spain) Cádiz

=== Senegal ===
Coach: Oumar Sylla

No.	Pos.	Player	Date of birth (age)	Club
1	GK	Al Seyni Ndiaye	31 December 1989 (aged 35)	(Senegal) Vision Sport
2	DF	Ninou Diatta	5 October 1987 (aged 37)	(Senegal) Golf Beach Club
3	DF	Papa Ndoye	9 September 1985 (aged 39)	(Senegal) Ngor Almadies
4	MF	Seydina Gadiaga	10 June 2003 (aged 21)	(Senegal) Malika
5	DF	Mamadou Sylla	22 February 1986 (aged 39)	(Senegal) YOFF BS Dakar
6	MF	Amar Samb	14 August 1999 (aged 25)	(Senegal) Ngor Almadies
7	FW	Sanou Thiaw	11 January 1999 (aged 26)	(Senegal) Kawsara
8	FW	Mandione Diagne	27 July 2002 (aged 22)	(Senegal) YOFF BS Dakar
9	FW	Raoul Mendy	30 December 1992 (aged 32)	(Senegal) Mamelles SA Dakar
10	FW	Mamour Diagne	4 October 1990 (aged 34)	(Senegal) Ngor Almadies
11	FW	Sidy Fall	5 May 2004 (aged 20)	(Senegal) YOFF BS Dakar
12	GK	Ousseynou Faye	4 February 2005 (aged 20)	(Senegal) Ngor Almadies

=== Chile ===
Coach: Eduardo Medalla

No.	Pos.	Player	Date of birth (age)	Club
1	GK	Orlando Echeverria	24 November 1986 (aged 38)	(Chile) CD Iquique
2	DF	Sebastián Bolivar	19 August 1984 (aged 40)	(Chile) Union Morro
3	MF	César Rama	27 February 2006 (aged 19)	(Chile) Bullers
4	MF	Matías Araya	19 July 2005 (aged 19)	(Chile) Bullers
5	FW	Gabriel Bacian	15 July 2000 (aged 24)	(Chile) Camba
6	DF	Diego Opazo	4 February 2003 (aged 22)	(Chile) Bullers
7	MF	Diego San Martin	15 June 2001 (aged 23)	(Chile) Bullers
8	DF	Andrés Albuerño	11 January 1988 (aged 37)	(Chile) CD Iquique
9	FW	Héctor Tobar	23 January 2000 (aged 25)	(Chile) Bullers
10	MF	Daniel Durán	5 February 1998 (aged 27)	(Chile) Camba
11	FW	Javier Aguilera	13 June 1995 (aged 29)	(Chile) Union Morro
12	GK	Pablo Rodríguez	30 January 1987 (aged 38)	(Chile) Union Morro

=== Tahiti ===
Coach: Teva Zaveroni

No.	Pos.	Player	Date of birth (age)	Club
1	GK	Jonathan Torohia	22 February 1985 (aged 40)	(French Polynesia) AS Dragon
2	DF	Matatia Paama	3 October 1992 (aged 32)	(French Polynesia) AS Pirae
3	MF	Heimaru Terorotua	18 December 2002 (aged 22)	(French Polynesia) AS Mataiea
4	DF	Heimanu Taiarui	24 August 1986 (aged 38)	(French Polynesia) AS Pirae
5	MF	Gervais Chan-Kat	16 November 1992 (aged 32)	(French Polynesia) AS Arue
6	MF	Patrick Tepas	28 May 1989 (aged 35)	(French Polynesia) AS Pirae
7	MF	Raimana Li Fung Kuee	10 April 1985 (aged 40)	(French Polynesia) AS Pirae
8	MF	Heiarii Tavanae	15 February 1992 (aged 33)	(French Polynesia) AS Venus
9	MF	Heirauarii Salem	23 April 1998 (aged 27)	(French Polynesia) AS Pirae
10	DF	Tamatoa Tetauira	17 March 1996 (aged 29)	(French Polynesia) AS Dragon
11	FW	Shawn Tinirauarrii	14 March 1997 (aged 28)	(French Polynesia) AS Dragon
12	GK	Jackson Teamotuitau	17 April 1992 (aged 33)	(French Polynesia) AS Tefana

== Group D ==
=== Brazil ===
Coach: Marco Octávio

No.	Pos.	Player	Date of birth (age)	Club
1	GK	Teleco	7 September 1999 (aged 25)	(Brazil) Náutico Capibaribe
2	MF	Benjamin Jr.	12 March 1994 (aged 31)	(Brazil) Vasco da Gama
3	DF	Antonio	2 October 1995 (aged 29)	(Brazil) Flamengo
4	DF	Catarino	9 January 1990 (aged 35)	(Brazil) Vasco da Gama
5	MF	Filipe	12 September 1993 (aged 31)	(Brazil) Sport Recife
6	MF	Brendo	11 February 1996 (aged 29)	(Brazil) Anchieta
7	FW	Edson Hulk	8 March 1994 (aged 31)	(Brazil) Sampaio Correa
8	DF	Thanger	19 April 1993 (aged 32)	(Portugal) Braga
9	FW	Rodrigo	16 August 1993 (aged 31)	(Brazil) Botafogo
10	DF	Lucão	4 August 1991 (aged 33)	(Brazil) Vasco da Gama
11	MF	Mauricinho	9 December 1989 (aged 35)	(Brazil) Vasco da Gama
12	GK	Tiago Bobô	14 June 1991 (aged 33)	(Brazil) Sampaio Correa

=== El Salvador ===
Coach: Rudis Gonzalez

No.	Pos.	Player	Date of birth (age)	Club
1	GK	Erick Najera	17 August 1997 (aged 27)	(El Salvador) Barra De Santiago
2	MF	Oscar Cruz	15 May 1995 (aged 29)	(El Salvador) Chirilagua Futbol Club
3	DF	Heber Ramos	4 May 1990 (aged 34)	(El Salvador) Barra De Santiago
4	DF	Melvin Gonzalez	5 December 1997 (aged 27)	(El Salvador) La Pirraya FC
5	MF	Emerson Cerna	6 February 2001 (aged 24)	(El Salvador) Rancho Viejo
6	DF	Rogelio Rauda	31 August 1994 (aged 30)	(El Salvador) Barra De Santiago
7	MF	Elmer Robles	13 October 1990 (aged 34)	(El Salvador) Isla San Sebastian
8	FW	Andersson Castro	27 July 2000 (aged 24)	(El Salvador) Barra De Santiago
9	FW	Jose Batres	12 October 1991 (aged 33)	(El Salvador) La Pirraya FC
10	FW	Agustin Ruiz	1 December 1987 (aged 37)	(El Salvador) La Pirraya FC
11	FW	Frank Velasquez	12 February 1990 (aged 35)	(El Salvador) Barra De Santiago
12	GK	Jose Portillo	6 May 1989 (aged 35)	(El Salvador) Chirilagua Futbol Club

=== Italy ===
Coach: Emiliano Del Duca

No.	Pos.	Player	Date of birth (age)	Club
1	GK	Leandro Casapieri	31 March 1994 (aged 31)	(Italy) Pisa
2	MF	Alessandro Andriani	18 November 2005 (aged 19)	(Italy) Lazio
3	FW	Camillo Marchesi	29 August 1991 (aged 33)	(Italy) Viareggio
4	MF	Gianmarco Genovali	25 March 1994 (aged 31)	(Italy) Viareggio
5	DF	Josep Junior	19 April 2000 (aged 25)	(Italy) Sambenedettese
6	DF	Luca Bertacca	4 May 2001 (aged 23)	(Italy) Pisa
7	MF	Fabio Sciacca	16 May 1989 (aged 35)	(Italy) ASD Napoli
8	MF	Ovidio Alla	28 October 1996 (aged 28)	(Italy) Terracina
9	FW	Emmanuele Zurlo	27 February 1988 (aged 37)	(Italy) Catania
10	MF	Tommaso Fazzini	18 May 2001 (aged 23)	(Italy) Pisa
11	FW	Alessandro Remedi	2 November 1992 (aged 32)	(Italy) Viareggio
12	GK	Gean Pietro	24 March 1998 (aged 27)	(Italy) Viareggio

=== Oman ===
Coach: Talib Al Thanawi

No.	Pos.	Player	Date of birth (age)	Club
1	GK	Said Al Farsi	31 January 1988 (aged 37)	(Oman) Al Seeb Club
2	FW	Abdullah Al Sauti	10 August 1993 (aged 31)	(Oman) Quriyat Club
3	FW	Musallam Al Araimi	1 October 2004 (aged 20)	(Oman) Sur SC
4	FW	Yahya Al Muriki	13 January 1998 (aged 27)	(Oman) Saham Club
5	DF	Mandhar Al Araimi	22 May 1984 (aged 40)	(Oman) Sur SC
6	DF	Mushel Al Araimi	9 March 1986 (aged 39)	(Oman) Sur SC
7	MF	Ahmed Al Owaisi	20 July 1998 (aged 26)	(Oman) Al Mussannah SC
8	FW	Nooh Al Zadjali	10 August 1991 (aged 33)	(Oman) Al Mussannah SC
9	FW	Sami Al Bulushi	4 September 1994 (aged 30)	(Oman) Al Shabab Club
10	MF	Khalid Al Oraimi	17 March 1992 (aged 33)	(Oman) Al Seeb Club
11	MF	Salim Al Oraimi	30 March 1997 (aged 28)	(Oman) Al Oruba SC
12	GK	Younis Al Owaisi	29 January 1993 (aged 32)	(Oman) Al Shabab Club

== Withdrawals ==
Players in the final squad can be replaced by a player from the preliminary squad due to "serious" injury or illness up to 24 hours prior to kickoff of the team's first match. The following withdrawals and replacements took place after the initial squads were revealed on 15 April:

- (Spain) Domingo Cabrera → replaced by Roberto Galindo
- (El Salvador) Jason Urbina → replaced by Rogelio Rauda

== Statistics ==
Overall, 192 players have travelled to Seychelles to compete in the tournament. The average age of all players is 29.6 years.

Fifteen of the sixteen managers are managing their own nation's national team whilst one manage a foreign team in respect to their own nationality.

Youngest v oldest player

	Name	Nation	Date of birth (age)	Age difference
Youngest player	Lienal Bibi	Seychelles	19 August 2008 (aged 16)	26 years 6 months 12 days
Oldest player	Samuel Pérez	Guatemala	8 February 1982 (aged 43)	26 years 6 months 12 days

Tallest v shortest player

	Name	Nation	Height metric (imperial)	Height difference
Tallest player	Anatoliy Ryabko	Belarus	1.97 m (6 ft 5 1/2 in)	0.32 m (1 ft 1/2 in)
Shortest player	Cheikh Belkheir	Mauritania	1.65 m (5 ft 5 in)	0.32 m (1 ft 1/2 in)

Average age of squads

Average age	Nation(s)
25	Mauritania
26	Spain
27	Paraguay
28	Chile
29	Guatemala; Iran; Italy; Senegal
30	Portugal; Seychelles
31	Belarus; Brazil; El Salvador; Oman
32	Tahiti
33	Japan

Players by age category

Age category	No. of players
≤22	24
23–27	48
28–32	55
33–37	48
≥38	17
