= 2021 FIFA Beach Soccer World Cup squads =

List of players to feature at the 2021 FIFA Beach Soccer World Cup

The 2021 FIFA Beach Soccer World Cup was an international beach soccer tournament held in Russia from 19 to 29 August 2021. The 16 national teams involved in the tournament were required by FIFA to register a squad of 14 players, including three goalkeepers. This article lists the national beach soccer squads that will take part in the tournament. Only the players listed in these squads below are eligible to take part in the tournament which were revealed in full on 13 August 2021.

The age listed for each player is as on 19 August 2021, the first day of the tournament and the names of the players shown are, in most circumstances, that of the FIFA Display Names listed on the official squad document issued by FIFA.

== Group A ==
=== RFU ===
Coach: Mikhail Likhachev

No.	Pos.	Player	Date of birth (age)	Club
1	GK	Maksim Chuzhkov	11 April 1987 (aged 34)	(Russian Football Union) Kristall
2	DF	Andrei Novikov	7 February 1996 (aged 25)	(Russian Football Union) Lokomotiv Moscow
3	DF	Kirill Romanov	20 January 1990 (aged 31)	(Russian Football Union) Kristall
4	FW	Aleksey Makarov	20 August 1987 (aged 33)	(Russian Football Union) Kristall
5	DF	Yuri Krasheninnikov	19 December 1984 (aged 36)	(Russian Football Union) Kristall
6	FW	Dmitry Shishin	14 March 1986 (aged 35)	(Russian Football Union) Kristall
7	DF	Anton Shkarin	15 November 1982 (aged 38)	(Russian Football Union) Spartak Moscow
8	FW	Ostap Fedorov	18 November 1995 (aged 25)	(Russian Football Union) Spartak Moscow
9	FW	Boris Nikonorov	3 April 1989 (aged 32)	(Russian Football Union) Lokomotiv Moscow
10	DF	Artur Paporotnyi	28 November 1985 (aged 35)	(Russian Football Union) Kristall
11	FW	Fedor Zemskov	13 January 1988 (aged 33)	(Russian Football Union) Lokomotiv Moscow
12	GK	Denis Parkhomenko	2 August 1998 (aged 23)	(Russian Football Union) Lokomotiv Moscow
13	GK	Stanislav Kosharnyi	22 July 1994 (aged 27)	(Russian Football Union) Lokomotiv Moscow
14	FW	Andrey Kotenev	15 May 1994 (aged 27)	(Russian Football Union) Spartak Moscow

=== United States ===
Coach: Francis Farberoff

The final squad was announced on 11 August 2021.

No.	Pos.	Player	Date of birth (age)	Club
1	GK	Christopher Toth	4 August 1989 (aged 32)	(United States Soccer Federation) Tacoma Stars
2	DF	Chris Albiston	26 September 1992 (aged 28)	Unattached
3	DF	David Mondragon	18 October 1991 (aged 29)	Unattached
4	FW	Tanner Akol	27 September 1993 (aged 27)	Unattached
5	DF	Nicolas Perea	6 August 1992 (aged 29)	Unattached
6	DF	Jason Santos	29 June 1988 (aged 33)	Unattached
7	FW	Nick Perera (captain)	5 June 1986 (aged 35)	(United States Soccer Federation) Tacoma Stars
8	FW	Lucas Roque	5 March 1988 (aged 33)	(United States Soccer Federation) Baltimore Blast
9	FW	Alessandro Canale	29 December 1989 (aged 31)	Unattached
10	FW	Gabriel Silveira	28 April 1992 (aged 29)	Unattached
11	GK	Xavier Snaer-Williams	28 May 1999 (aged 22)	Unattached
12	GK	Esteban Sapetnitzky	15 September 1996 (aged 24)	Unattached
13	FW	Fredo Dilbert	25 November 1997 (aged 23)	Unattached
14	FW	Conner Rezende	21 January 1993 (aged 28)	Unattached

=== Paraguay ===
Coach: Joaquin Molas

No.	Pos.	Player	Date of birth (age)	Club
1	GK	Rolando Gonzalez	29 August 1979 (aged 41)	(Paraguayan Football Association) Presidente Hayes
2	MF	Sixto Cantero	4 September 1997 (aged 23)	(Paraguayan Football Association) Cerro Porteño
3	DF	Gustavo Benitez	13 June 1981 (aged 40)	(Paraguayan Football Association) Presidente Hayes
4	MF	Luis Ojeda	18 October 1990 (aged 30)	(Paraguayan Football Association) Cerro Porteño
5	MF	Jhovanny Benitez	24 July 1999 (aged 22)	(Paraguayan Football Association) Cerro Porteño
6	FW	Pedro Moran	9 June 1990 (aged 31)	(Italian Football Federation) Sambenedettese
7	MF	Miciades Medina	16 February 2003 (aged 18)	(Paraguayan Football Association) Casa España
8	FW	Carlos Carballo	31 January 1993 (aged 28)	(Royal Spanish Football Federation) San Francisco
9	FW	Nestor Medina	10 April 1998 (aged 23)	(Paraguayan Football Association) Presidente Hayes
10	FW	Valentin Benitez	20 January 1999 (aged 22)	(Paraguayan Football Association) Cerro Porteño
11	DF	Sergio Villaverde	23 February 1989 (aged 32)	(Paraguayan Football Association) Cerro Porteño
12	GK	Yoao Rolon	23 August 1996 (aged 24)	(Paraguayan Football Association) Cerro Porteño
13	DF	Rodrigo Escobar	9 September 1998 (aged 22)	(Paraguayan Football Association) Cerro Porteño
14	GK	Alexis Benitez	11 June 1998 (aged 23)	(Paraguayan Football Association) Cerro Porteño

=== Japan ===
Coach: Ozu Moreira (interim)

The final squad was announced on 26 July 2021.

On 15 August, Ryunosuke Miyama replaced the injured Kosuke Matsuda.

No.	Pos.	Player	Date of birth (age)	Club
1	GK	Yusuke Kawai	6 May 1988 (aged 33)	(Japan Football Association) Tokyo Verdy
2	MF	Takumi Saito	16 August 1988 (aged 33)	(Japan Football Association) Sol Mar Praia Okinawa
3	MF	Ryota Tsuboya	17 June 1994 (aged 27)	(Japan Football Association) Sol Mar Praia Okinawa
4	FW	Ryunosuke Miyama	6 September 1994 (aged 26)	(Japan Football Association) Tokyo Verdy
5	MF	Shotaro Haraguchi	26 March 1987 (aged 34)	(Japan Football Association) Tokyo Verdy
6	FW	Takuya Akaguma	21 November 1989 (aged 31)	(Japan Football Association) Lazo Apego Kitakyusyu
7	MF	Takaaki Oba	24 December 1992 (aged 28)	(Japan Football Association) Loewe Yokohama
8	MF	Naoya Matsuo	18 August 1988 (aged 33)	(Japan Football Association) Loewe Yokohama
9	FW	Shusei Yamauchi	9 September 1985 (aged 35)	(Japan Football Association) Tokyo Verdy
10	DF	Ozu Moreira (captain)	21 January 1986 (aged 35)	(Japan Football Association) Tokyo Verdy
11	FW	Masanori Okuyama	7 June 1986 (aged 35)	(Japan Football Association) Loewe Yokohama
12	GK	Tomoya Ginoza	2 April 1985 (aged 36)	(Japan Football Association) Sol Mar Praia Okinawa
13	GK	Yu Shirota	20 August 1986 (aged 34)	(Japan Football Association) Loewe Yokohama
14	MF	Takumi Uesato	29 April 1990 (aged 31)	(Japan Football Association) Tokyo Verdy

== Group B ==
=== Mozambique ===
Coach: Abineiro Ussaca

No.	Pos.	Player	Date of birth (age)	Club
1	GK	Manuel Tivane	11 February 1996 (aged 25)	(Mozambican Football Federation) Ferroviário De Maputo
2	DF	Bachir Mussa	16 February 1993 (aged 28)	(Mozambican Football Federation) CAP
3	DF	Ângelo Tomas	2 February 1996 (aged 25)	(Mozambican Football Federation) Team Loyal
4	DF	Hermínio Ernesto	16 June 1987 (aged 34)	(Mozambican Football Federation) Vulcano
5	DF	Gerson Chivale	8 February 1991 (aged 30)	(Mozambican Football Federation) Vulcano
6	MF	Nelson Manuel	2 February 1996 (aged 25)	(Mozambican Football Federation) Textafrica De Chimoio
7	MF	Yuran Malate	12 April 1996 (aged 25)	(Mozambican Football Federation) Polana Canico
8	FW	Gabriel Macuvele	4 February 1981 (aged 40)	(Mozambican Football Federation) Team Loyal
9	MF	António Namape Junior (Figo)	19 February 1993 (aged 28)	(Mozambican Football Federation) CAP
10	FW	Rachide Smithe	20 April 1988 (aged 33)	(Mozambican Football Federation) CAP
11	FW	Helder Mahumane	17 September 1993 (aged 27)	(Mozambican Football Federation) CAP
12	GK	Anivaldo Mavie	3 February 1983 (aged 38)	(Mozambican Football Federation) Vulcano
13	DF	Ramossete Cumbe (Dez)	30 January 1990 (aged 31)	(Mozambican Football Federation) CAP
14	GK	Pedro Xavier Da Barca	23 May 1977 (aged 44)	(Mozambican Football Federation) Tau-Tau

=== Spain ===
Coach: Cristian Mendez

No.	Pos.	Player	Date of birth (age)	Club
1	GK	Francisco Donaire	16 August 1982 (aged 39)	(Royal Spanish Football Federation) Almeria
2	MF	David Ardil	11 January 1999 (aged 22)	(Royal Spanish Football Federation) Melistar
3	DF	Antonio Mayor	20 April 1983 (aged 38)	(Royal Spanish Football Federation) Levante
4	DF	Adri Frutos	25 July 1991 (aged 30)	(Royal Spanish Football Federation) Murcia
5	DF	José Cintas	22 September 1987 (aged 33)	(Royal Spanish Football Federation) Melistar
6	MF	Riduan Dris Bouzian	21 October 1990 (aged 30)	(Royal Spanish Football Federation) Melistar
7	FW	Pablo Perez	28 July 1985 (aged 36)	(Royal Spanish Football Federation) Las Palmas
8	MF	Francisco Mejias	5 May 1987 (aged 34)	(Royal Spanish Football Federation) Cádiz
9	FW	Eduard Suarez	6 August 1990 (aged 31)	(Royal Spanish Football Federation) Levante
10	FW	Llorenç Gómez	3 November 1991 (aged 29)	(Russian Football Union) Kristall
11	FW	Chiky Ardil	17 April 1988 (aged 33)	(Royal Spanish Football Federation) Melistar
12	GK	Pablo Lopez	11 December 1998 (aged 22)	(Royal Spanish Football Federation) Mazarron
13	GK	Juanmi	17 January 2000 (aged 21)	(Royal Spanish Football Federation) San Francisco
14	MF	Javier Torres	16 February 1983 (aged 38)	(Royal Spanish Football Federation) San Francisco

=== Tahiti ===
Coach: Teva Zaveroni

No.	Pos.	Player	Date of birth (age)	Club
1	GK	Jonathan Torohia	22 February 1985 (aged 36)	(Tahitian Football Federation) Manu Ura
2	MF	Matatia Paama	3 October 1992 (aged 28)	(Tahitian Football Federation) Pirae
3	FW	Tamatoa Tetauira	17 March 1996 (aged 25)	(French Football Federation) Alliance Muespach
4	DF	Heimanu Taiarui	24 August 1986 (aged 34)	(Tahitian Football Federation) Pirae
5	FW	Gervais Chan-Kat	16 November 1992 (aged 28)	(Tahitian Football Federation) Arue
6	MF	Patrick Tepa	28 May 1989 (aged 32)	(Tahitian Football Federation) Tiare
7	FW	Raimana Li Fung Kuee	10 April 1985 (aged 36)	(Tahitian Football Federation) Pirae
8	MF	Heiarii Tavanae	15 February 1992 (aged 29)	(Tahitian Football Federation) Central Sport
9	MF	Heirauarii Salem	23 April 1998 (aged 23)	(Tahitian Football Federation) Pirae
10	FW	Tearii Labaste	19 July 1991 (aged 30)	(Tahitian Football Federation) Pirae
11	MF	Teva Zaveroni	10 October 1975 (aged 45)	(Tahitian Football Federation) Pirae
12	GK	Beo Revel	18 July 1984 (aged 37)	(Tahitian Football Federation) Pirae
13	MF	Teaonui Tehau	1 September 1992 (aged 28)	(Tahitian Football Federation) Venus
14	GK	Gabriel Amau	27 June 1994 (aged 27)	(Tahitian Football Federation) Tefana

=== United Arab Emirates ===
Coach: Mohamed Bashir

No.	Pos.	Player	Date of birth (age)	Club
1	GK	Mohamed Al Bahri	7 September 1988 (aged 32)	(United Arab Emirates Football Association) Shabab Al Ahli
2	MF	Haitham Mohamed	21 June 1980 (aged 41)	Unattached
3	MF	Ahmed Beshr	11 February 1989 (aged 32)	Unattached
4	MF	Waleed Beshr	29 May 1991 (aged 30)	(United Arab Emirates Football Association) Al Nasr
5	DF	Abbas Ali	25 January 1989 (aged 32)	(United Arab Emirates Football Association) Shabab Al Ahli
6	DF	Rashed Eid	22 January 1993 (aged 28)	Unattached
7	FW	Hesham Muntaser	30 June 1995 (aged 26)	Unattached
8	MF	Ali Mohammad	19 August 1996 (aged 25)	Unattached
9	FW	Jamal Mahammad Saif Obaid	10 October 1990 (aged 30)	Unattached
10	FW	Ahmad Abdulrahman Ali Malahi	10 October 1990 (aged 30)	Unattached
11	MF	Hasan Alhammadi	28 March 1982 (aged 39)	(United Arab Emirates Football Association) Ajman Club
12	GK	Humaid Jamal	15 August 1989 (aged 32)	(United Arab Emirates Football Association) Shabab Al Ahli
13	DF	Hussain Ali	12 January 1986 (aged 35)	Unattached
14	GK	Saeed Yaqoub	24 April 1995 (aged 26)	Unattached

== Group C ==
=== Belarus ===
Coach: (Spain) Nicolás Caporale

No.	Pos.	Player	Date of birth (age)	Club
1	GK	Uladzimir Ustsinovich	27 February 1999 (aged 22)	(Football Federation of Belarus) TSOR-Masita
2	DF	Vadzim Bokach	25 January 1984 (aged 37)	(Football Federation of Belarus) TSOR-Masita
3	DF	Yauheni Novikau	15 November 1993 (aged 27)	(Football Federation of Belarus) TSOR-Masita
4	FW	Artsemi Drozd	13 January 1996 (aged 25)	(Football Federation of Belarus) TSOR-Masita
5	FW	Aleh Hapon	11 September 1996 (aged 24)	(Russian Football Union) Spartak Moscow
6	MF	Yury Piatrouski	6 May 1994 (aged 27)	(Football Federation of Belarus) TSOR-Masita
7	DF	Anton Akulich	25 February 1994 (aged 27)	(Football Federation of Belarus) TSOR-Masita
8	DF	Ivan Kanstantsinau	8 July 1989 (aged 32)	(Football Federation of Belarus) TSOR-Masita
9	DF	Yahor Hardzetski	9 February 1996 (aged 25)	(Russian Football Union) CSKA Moscow
10	FW	Anatoliy Ryabko	9 October 1989 (aged 31)	(Russian Football Union) Spartak Moscow
11	DF	Mikita Chaikouski	21 May 1998 (aged 23)	(Football Federation of Belarus) Shchuchin
12	GK	Kanstantsin Mahaletski	21 October 1991 (aged 29)	(Football Federation of Belarus) TSOR-Masita
13	DF	Uladzislau Batsiunia	1 August 1996 (aged 25)	(Football Federation of Belarus) TSOR-Masita
14	GK	Stanislau Kliashchuk	11 April 2000 (aged 21)	(Football Federation of Belarus) Dinamo Minsk

=== Brazil ===
Coach: Gilberto Costa

No.	Pos.	Player	Date of birth (age)	Club
1	GK	Mão	6 December 1978 (aged 42)	(Brazilian Football Confederation) Anchieta
2	FW	Alisson	23 April 2001 (aged 20)	(Brazilian Football Confederation) Sampaio Corrêa
3	DF	Antonio	2 October 1995 (aged 25)	(Brazilian Football Confederation) Flamengo
4	DF	Catarino	9 January 1990 (aged 31)	(Brazilian Football Confederation) Vasco da Gama
5	DF	Filipe	12 September 1993 (aged 27)	(Brazilian Football Confederation) Sport Recife
6	FW	Lucão	4 August 1991 (aged 30)	(Brazilian Football Confederation) Vasco da Gama
7	FW	Edson Hulk	8 March 1994 (aged 27)	(Brazilian Football Confederation) Sampaio Corrêa
8	DF	Luis Enrique	8 June 1991 (aged 30)	(Brazilian Football Confederation) Vasco da Gama
9	FW	Rodrigo	16 August 1993 (aged 28)	(Brazilian Football Confederation) Botafogo
10	DF	Datinha	12 April 1988 (aged 33)	(Brazilian Football Confederation) Sampaio Corrêa
11	FW	Mauricinho	9 December 1989 (aged 31)	(Brazilian Football Confederation) Vasco da Gama
12	GK	Rafa Padilha	11 May 1993 (aged 28)	(Brazilian Football Confederation) Vasco da Gama
13	FW	Zé Lucas	5 June 1990 (aged 31)	(Brazilian Football Confederation) Sampaio Corrêa
14	GK	Tiago Bobo	14 June 1991 (aged 30)	(Brazilian Football Confederation) Sampaio Corrêa

=== El Salvador ===
Coach: Rudis González

No.	Pos.	Player	Date of birth (age)	Club
1	GK	Erick Najera	17 August 1997 (aged 24)	Unattached
2	DF	Oscar Cruz	15 May 1995 (aged 26)	Unattached
3	DF	Heber Ramos	4 May 1990 (aged 31)	Unattached
4	DF	Melvin Gonzalez	5 December 1997 (aged 23)	Unattached
5	FW	Exxon Perdomo	6 November 1994 (aged 26)	Unattached
6	FW	Jason Urbina	26 February 1995 (aged 26)	Unattached
7	MF	Elmer Robles	13 October 1990 (aged 30)	Unattached
8	MF	Darwin Ramirez	19 January 1986 (aged 35)	Unattached
9	FW	Ruben Batres	12 October 1991 (aged 29)	Unattached
10	FW	Andres Osorio	20 April 1997 (aged 24)	Unattached
11	FW	Frank Velásquez	12 February 1990 (aged 31)	(Salvadoran Football Federation) Barra de Santiago
12	GK	Jose Portillo	6 May 1989 (aged 32)	Unattached
13	FW	Melvin Segovia	17 January 1990 (aged 31)	Unattached
14	GK	Jose Yanes	21 June 2001 (aged 20)	Unattached

=== Switzerland ===
Coach: Angelo Schirinzi

No.	Pos.	Player	Date of birth (age)	Club
1	GK	Silvano Kessler	14 November 1995 (aged 25)	Unattached
2	DF	Kevin Tchatat	24 May 1995 (aged 26)	(Swiss Football Association) Havana Shots
3	MF	Benjamin Looser	15 August 1997 (aged 24)	(Swiss Football Association) Havana Shots
4	MF	Michael Misev	15 February 1991 (aged 30)	(Swiss Football Association) Sable Dancers
5	MF	Jan Ostgen	11 June 1996 (aged 25)	(Swiss Football Association) Havana Shots
6	FW	Tobias Steinemann	6 June 1996 (aged 25)	(Swiss Football Association) Havana Shots
7	DF	Sandro Spaccarotella	5 August 1982 (aged 39)	(Swiss Football Association) Grasshoppers
8	DF	Philipp Borer	15 June 1990 (aged 31)	(Italian Football Federation) Viareggio
9	FW	Dejan Stankovic	25 August 1985 (aged 35)	(Italian Football Federation) Viareggio
10	MF	Noël Ott	15 January 1994 (aged 27)	(Italian Football Federation) Viareggio
11	FW	Glenn Hodel	22 November 1996 (aged 24)	(Italian Football Federation) Napoli
12	MF	Patrick Ruettimann	8 April 1993 (aged 28)	(Swiss Football Association) Grasshoppers
13	GK	Eliott Mounoud	10 August 1995 (aged 26)	(Royal Spanish Football Federation) Torredembarra
14	DF	Mo Jäeggy	1 January 1983 (aged 38)	(Swiss Football Association) Chargers

== Group D ==
=== Oman ===
Coach: Talib Al Thanawi

No.	Pos.	Player	Date of birth (age)	Club
1	GK	Said Al-Farsi	31 January 1988 (aged 33)	(Oman Football Association) Al Seeb Club
2	FW	Abdullah Al-Sauti	10 August 1993 (aged 28)	(Oman Football Association) Quriyat Club
3	MF	Jalal Al-Sinani	17 November 1986 (aged 34)	(Oman Football Association) Quriyat Club
4	MF	Yahya Al-Araimi	1 May 1984 (aged 37)	(Oman Football Association) Al Mussannah
5	DF	Mandhar Al-Araimi	22 May 1984 (aged 37)	(Oman Football Association) Al Oruba
6	DF	Mushel Al-Araimi	9 March 1986 (aged 35)	(Oman Football Association) Sur
7	MF	Eid Al-Farsi	17 April 1989 (aged 32)	(Oman Football Association) Sur
8	MF	Nooh Al-Zadjali	10 August 1991 (aged 30)	(Oman Football Association) Al Mussannah
9	FW	Hamood Al-Tooqi	10 October 1989 (aged 31)	(Oman Football Association) Oman Club
10	FW	Khalid Al-Oraimi	17 March 1992 (aged 29)	(Oman Football Association) Al Oruba
11	FW	Salim Al-Oraimi	30 March 1997 (aged 24)	(Oman Football Association) Al Oruba
12	GK	Younis Al-Owaisi	29 January 1993 (aged 28)	(Oman Football Association) Al Shabab Club
13	GK	Amjad Al-Hamadani	13 May 1994 (aged 27)	(Oman Football Association) Al Mussannah
14	MF	Ahmed Al-Masharfi	7 February 1988 (aged 33)	(Oman Football Association) Al Oruba

=== Portugal ===
Coach: Mário Narciso

No.	Pos.	Player	Date of birth (age)	Club
1	GK	Tiago Petrony	18 November 1988 (aged 32)	(Portuguese Football Federation) Sporting CP
2	FW	Pedro Marques	31 March 1988 (aged 33)	(Portuguese Football Federation) Sporting CP
3	MF	André Lourenço	20 September 1995 (aged 25)	(Portuguese Football Federation) Braga
4	DF	Bruno Torres	21 April 1980 (aged 41)	(Portuguese Football Federation) Braga
5	FW	Miguel Pintado	5 February 1993 (aged 28)	(Portuguese Football Federation) CB Loures
6	MF	Rodrigo Pinhal	10 February 1998 (aged 23)	(Portuguese Football Federation) Sporting CP
7	MF	Ruben Brilhante	1 December 2000 (aged 20)	(Portuguese Football Federation) Braga
8	MF	Bê Martins	29 December 1989 (aged 31)	(Portuguese Football Federation) Braga
9	FW	João Gonçalves (Von)	9 May 1995 (aged 26)	(Portuguese Football Federation) Sporting CP
10	MF	Belchior	9 October 1982 (aged 38)	(Portuguese Football Federation) Sporting CP
11	FW	Léo Martins	29 December 1989 (aged 31)	(Portuguese Football Federation) Braga
12	GK	Elinton Andrade	30 March 1979 (aged 42)	(Portuguese Football Federation) CB Loures
13	MF	Fabio Costa	3 July 1994 (aged 27)	(Portuguese Football Federation) Braga
14	GK	Pedro Mano	19 February 1996 (aged 25)	(Portuguese Football Federation) Braga

=== Senegal ===
Coach: Oumar Sylla

No.	Pos.	Player	Date of birth (age)	Club
1	GK	Al Seyni Ndiaye	31 December 1989 (aged 31)	(Senegalese Football Federation) Vison Sport
2	DF	Ninou Diatta	5 October 1987 (aged 33)	(Senegalese Football Federation) Golf Beach Club
3	DF	Pape Mar Boye	30 December 2003 (aged 17)	(Senegalese Football Federation) Galaxy De Dakar
4	DF	Papa Ndour	30 August 1991 (aged 29)	(French Football Federation) E.S. Nogent Le Roi
5	DF	Mamadou Sylla	22 February 1986 (aged 35)	(Senegalese Football Federation) ASC Les Jaraaf De Dakar
6	DF	Amar Samb	14 August 1999 (aged 22)	(Senegalese Football Federation) Ngor Almadies
7	MF	Babacar Fall	5 March 1989 (aged 32)	(Senegalese Football Federation) Yeumbeul
8	FW	Mandione Diagne	27 July 2002 (aged 19)	(Senegalese Football Federation) ASC Les Jaraaf De Dakar
9	FW	Raoul Mendy	30 December 1992 (aged 28)	(Senegalese Football Federation) Mamelles S.A. De Dakar
10	MF	Mamour Diagne	4 October 1990 (aged 30)	(Senegalese Football Federation) YOFF De Dakar
11	FW	Ibrahima Balde	8 September 1988 (aged 32)	(Senegalese Football Federation) Mamelles S.A. De Dakar
12	GK	Amadou Ba	13 September 1987 (aged 33)	(Senegalese Football Federation) Ngor Almadies
13	GK	Issa Diagne	14 February 1999 (aged 22)	(Senegalese Football Federation) YOFF De Dakar
14	DF	Limamou Niang	11 February 1999 (aged 22)	(Senegalese Football Federation) Kawsara

=== Uruguay ===
Coach: German Parrillo

No.	Pos.	Player	Date of birth (age)	Club
1	GK	Gustavo Sebe	23 April 1979 (aged 42)	(Uruguayan Football Association) Racing Club
2	MF	Facundo Cordero	6 January 1997 (aged 24)	(Uruguayan Football Association) Rampla Juniors
3	DF	Santiago Miranda	10 August 1992 (aged 29)	(Uruguayan Football Association) Bella Vista
4	DF	Matias Cabrera	5 November 1985 (aged 35)	(Uruguayan Football Association) Club Malvin
5	MF	Gaston Laduche	6 July 1995 (aged 26)	(Uruguayan Football Association) Club Malvin
6	DF	Agustin Quinta	23 January 1999 (aged 22)	(Uruguayan Football Association) Fenix
7	MF	Luis Quinta	10 May 1990 (aged 31)	(Uruguayan Football Association) Danubio
8	MF	Gonzalo Cazet	25 March 1986 (aged 35)	(Uruguayan Football Association) Cerrito
9	FW	Andres Laens	4 October 1997 (aged 23)	(Uruguayan Football Association) Club Malvin
10	FW	Marcelo Capurro	4 November 1981 (aged 39)	(Uruguayan Football Association) Racing Club
11	FW	Nicolas Bella	2 March 1987 (aged 34)	(Uruguayan Football Association) Club Malvin
12	GK	Alejandro Guerrero	29 March 1987 (aged 34)	(Uruguayan Football Association) Rampla Juniors
13	GK	Felipe Fernandez	4 October 1987 (aged 33)	(Uruguayan Football Association) Parque Del Plata
14	FW	Richard Catardo	15 December 1988 (aged 32)	(Uruguayan Football Association) Club Malvin

== Statistics ==
Overall, 224 players have travelled to Russia to compete in the tournament. The average age of all players is 29.9 years.

Fifteen of the sixteen managers are managing their own nation's national team whilst just one manages a foreign team in respect to their own nationality.

Youngest v oldest player

	Name	Nation	DoB/Age	Age difference
Youngest player	Pape Mar Boye	Senegal	30 December 2003 (aged 17)	28 years 2 months 20 days
Oldest player	Teva Zaveroni	Tahiti	10 October 1975 (aged 45)	28 years 2 months 20 days

Average age of squads

Average age	Nation(s)
27	Belarus; Paraguay
28	El Salvador; Senegal
29	Switzerland; United States
30	Brazil; Portugal
31	Mozambique; Oman; RFU; Spain; Tahiti; Uruguay
32	Japan
33	United Arab Emirates

Players by age category

Age category	No. of players
≤21	8
22–27	71
28–33	92
34–39	42
≥40	11

== See also ==
- 2021 FIFA Futsal World Cup squads
