= 2024 OFC Beach Soccer Men's Nations Cup =

2024 OFC Beach Soccer Nations Cup
2025 FIFA Beach Soccer World Cup OFC qualifier

Tournament details
- Host country: Solomon Islands
- City: Honiara
- Dates: 22–26 October
- Teams: 4 (from 1 confederation)
- Venue: 1 (in 1 host city)

Final positions
- Champions: Tahiti (4th title)
- Runners-up: Solomon Islands
- Third place: Fiji
- Fourth place: Papua New Guinea

Tournament statistics
- Matches played: 8
- Goals scored: 99 (12.38 per match)
- Attendance: 3,740 (468 per match)
- Top scorer: (French Polynesia) Heirauarii Salem (11 goals)
- Best player: (French Polynesia) Li Fung Kuee
- Best goalkeeper: (French Polynesia) Teave Teamotuaitau
- Fair play award: Fiji

The 2024 OFC Beach Soccer Nations Cup was the eighth edition of the OFC Beach Soccer Nations Cup, the top beach soccer competition contested by Oceanian men's national beach soccer teams. The tournament was organized by the Oceania Football Confederation (OFC).

The tournament took place from 22 to 26 October 2024 in the Solomon Islands, who hosted the tournament for the first time.

The tournament doubled as qualifiers for the 2025 FIFA Beach Soccer World Cup in Seychelles set to be held from 1 to 11 May 2025, with one slot being allocated to the champions. The previous champion was Tahiti.

== Teams ==
Team	Appearance	Previous best performance
Fiji	4th	Third place (2011, 2023)
Papua New Guinea	1st	Debut
Solomon Islands (hosts)	8th	Champions (2006, 2007, 2009, 2013)
Tahiti	7th	Champions (2011, 2019, 2023)

Did not enter

- American Samoa
- Cook Islands
- New Caledonia
- New Zealand
- Samoa
- Tonga
- Vanuatu

== Group stage ==
All times are local, SBT (UTC+11). Kickoff times shown are those scheduled; actual times may differ slightly.

Pos	Team	Pld	W	W+	WP	L	GF	GA	GD	Pts	Qualification
1	Tahiti	3	3	0	0	0	36	15	+21	9	Final
2	Solomon Islands (H)	3	1	0	0	2	28	16	+12	3	Final
3	Papua New Guinea	3	1	0	0	2	17	39	−22	3	Third Place Play-off
4	Fiji	3	0	0	1	2	9	20	−11	1	Third Place Play-off

Source: OFC
(H) Host
22 October 2024
13:00

Papua New Guinea	8–6	Fiji
Nabose 6'; Eiwana 12' (o.g.); Dean 20', 32'; Willie 23'; Singh 32'	Report	Manama 1'; Benard 3', 16', 33'; Kala 4', 9'; Samuel 21'; Vere 30'

SIFF Beach Soccer Pitch, Honiara
Attendance: 400
Referee: Aurelien Planchais-Godefroy (France)
22 October 2024
15:00

Tahiti	10–9	Solomon Islands
Salem 2', 19', 26', 36'; Paama 9'; Tinirauarii 10', 12', 24', 29'; Tetauira 30'	Report	Amasia 1', 8', 12'; Laua 18'; Wanega 19', 25'; Otainao 23'; Fa’ari 25'; Bobby 29'

SIFF Beach Soccer Pitch, Honiara
Attendance: 700
Referee: Mariano Romo (Argentina)

23 October 2024
13:00

Fiji	1–10	Tahiti
Catarogo 36'	Report	Terorotua 3'; Paama 5', 8'; Tinirauarii 7', 18'; Chan Kat 20', 30'; Tepa 24'; Tetauita 30'; Li Fung Kuee 35'

SIFF Beach Soccer Pitch, Honiara
Attendance: 140
Referee: Suparith Udma (Thailand)
23 October 2024
15:00

Solomon Islands	17–4	Papua New Guinea
Amasia 2' (pen.), 34' (pen.); Nawo 6', 20'; Bobby 9'; Wanega 8', 15', 22', 31', 33'; Fa’ari 16', 16', 29'; Reginald 17', 31', 36'; Otainao 19'	Report	Samuel 10', 21'; Kala 13'; Willie 30'

SIFF Beach Soccer Pitch, Honiara
Attendance: 700
Referee: Fallah Al Balushi (Oman)

24 October 2024
13:00

Papua New Guinea	5–16	Tahiti
Benard 5', 7'; Kala 17', 18'; Gele 20'	Report	Salem 1', 9', 10', 11', 17', 19', 25'; Tetauira 3', 7', 36'; Tepa 8', 19'; Chan Kat 10', 16', 36'; Tinirauarii 28'

SIFF Beach Soccer Pitch, Honiara
Attendance: 300
Referee: Hugo Pado (Solomon Islands)
24 October 2024
15:00

Solomon Islands	2–2 (a.e.t.)	Fiji
Fa’ari 3'; Amasia 28'	Report	Waranaivalu 20'; Dean 35'
Penalties
Otainao (penalty scored); Wanega (penalty scored); Amasia (penalty missed); Bobby (penalty scored); Fa'ari (penalty scored); Nawo (penalty scored); Laua (penalty missed); Ahua (penalty missed)	5–6	(penalty scored) Waranaivalu; (penalty missed) Gounder; (penalty scored) Nabose; (penalty scored) Dean; (penalty scored) Catarogo; (penalty scored) Waqanicakau; (penalty missed) Chand; (penalty scored) Koro

SIFF Beach Soccer Pitch, Honiara
Attendance: 600
Referee: Mariano Romo (Argentina)

== Play-off stage ==
=== Third place play-off ===
26 October 2024
13:00

Papua New Guinea	0–4	Fiji
	Report	Dean 8'; Catarogo 16', 22', 34'

SIFF Beach Soccer Pitch, Honiara
Attendance: 600
Referee: Aurelien Planchais-Godefroy (France)

=== Final ===
Winner will qualify for the 2025 FIFA Beach Soccer World Cup.

26 October 2024
15:00

Tahiti	3–2	Solomon Islands
Terorotua 16', 30'; Tinirauarii 21'	Report	Laua 17'; Wanega 25'

SIFF Beach Soccer Pitch, Honiara
Attendance: 900
Referee: Mariano Romo (Argentina)

== Qualified teams for FIFA Beach Soccer World Cup ==
The champion of the 2024 OFC Beach Soccer Nations Cup qualifies for the 2025 FIFA Beach Soccer World Cup.

Team	Qualified on	Previous appearances in FIFA Beach Soccer World Cup^{1} only FIFA era (since 2005)
Tahiti	26 October 2024	7 (2011, 2013, 2015, 2017, 2019, 2021, 2024)

== Awards ==
Award	Player/Team
Golden Ball	(French Polynesia) Raimana Li Fung Kuee
Golden Boot	(French Polynesia) Heirauarii Salem
Golden Glove	(French Polynesia) Teave Teamotuaitau
Fair Play Award	Fiji
