= Fiji national beach soccer team =

National sports team

Fiji
- Association: Fiji Football Association
- Confederation: OFC (Oceania)
- Head coach: Intiaz Khan
- FIFA code: FIJ
- BSWW ranking: 33 ▼1 (2 June 2025)
First colours
Second colours

OFC Beach Soccer Championship
- Appearances: 4 (first in 2009)
- Best result: Third place (2011, 2019, 2024)

Fiji national beach soccer team represents Fiji in international beach soccer competitions and is controlled by the Fiji Football Association, the governing body for football in Fiji.

== Current squad ==
Correct as of August 2023

Note: Flags indicate national team as defined under FIFA eligibility rules; some limited exceptions apply. Players may hold more than one non-FIFA nationality.

No.	Pos.	Nation	Player
2			Rajneel Singh
3			Meli Cordo
4			Gabiriele Matanisiga
5			Ronish Singh
6			Ravneel Pal
7			Rusiate Matarerega

No.	Pos.	Nation	Player
8			Bruce Hughes
9			Merrill Nand
10			Tevita Waranaivalu
11			Madhwan Gounder
12	GK		Jovilisi Borisi
15	GK		Simione Tamanisau

Coach: Jerry Sam

== Achievements ==
- OFC Beach Soccer Nations Cup Best: Third place
  - 2011
  - 2023
