= 2023 OFC Beach Soccer Nations Cup =

2023 FIFA Beach Soccer World Cup OFC qualifier

Tournament details
- Host country: Tahiti
- City: Papeete
- Dates: 22–26 August
- Teams: 4 (from 1 confederation)
- Venue: 1 (in 1 host city)

Final positions
- Champions: Tahiti (3rd title)
- Runners-up: Solomon Islands
- Third place: Fiji
- Fourth place: Tonga

Tournament statistics
- Matches played: 8
- Goals scored: 120 (15 per match)
- Attendance: 4,500 (563 per match)
- Top scorer: (Fiji) Gabiriele Matanisiga (12 goals)
- Best goalkeeper: (French Polynesia) Jonathan Torohia
- Fair play award: Fiji; Tahiti

The 2023 OFC Beach Soccer Nations Cup was the seventh edition of the OFC Beach Soccer Nations Cup, the top beach soccer competition contested by Oceanian men's national beach soccer teams. The tournament was organized by the Oceania Football Confederation (OFC).

The tournament was originally scheduled to take place in June, but was subsequently pushed back to take place from 22 to 26 August 2023 in Tahiti.

The tournament doubled as qualifiers for the 2023 FIFA Beach Soccer World Cup in the United Arab Emirates; the champions qualified.

== Teams ==
Four of the eleven OFC-affiliated members entered the tournament.

Team	Appearance	Previous best performance
Fiji	3rd	Third place (2011)
Solomon Islands	7th	Champions (2006, 2007, 2009, 2013)
Tahiti (hosts; title-holders)	6th	Champions (2011, 2019)
Tonga	2nd	5th place (2019)

== Venue ==
The tournament was held in Papeete at Aorai Tini Hau stadium, with an approximate capacity of 1,080.

== Group stage ==
All times are local, TAHT (GMT−10).

Pos	Team	Pld	W	W+	WP	L	GF	GA	GD	Pts	Qualification
1	Tahiti (H)	3	3	0	0	0	41	9	+32	9	Final
2	Solomon Islands	3	2	0	0	1	24	16	+8	6	Final
3	Fiji	3	1	0	0	2	27	14	+13	3	Third Place Match
4	Tonga	3	0	0	0	3	9	62	−53	0	Third Place Match

Source: OFC
(H) Host

=== Fiji vs Solomon Islands ===
22 August 2023
14:00

Fiji	3–6	Solomon Islands
Singh 7'; Matanisiga 14'; Pal 31'	Report	Matanisiga 1' (o.g.); Amasia 15', 25'; Fa'ari 18'; Bobby 23'; Naka 24'

Aorai Tini Hau, Papeete
Attendance: 500
Referee: Aurelien Planchais-Godefroy (France)

	4	Gabiriele Matanisiga
	7	Rusiate Matarerega
	10	Tevita Waranaivalu
	11	Madhwan Gounder
GK	15	Simione Tamanisau (c)
Substitutions:
	2	Rajneel Singh
	3	Meli Cordo
	5	Ronish Singh
	6	Ravneel Pal
	8	Bruce Hughes
	9	Merrill Nand
GK	12	Jovilisi Borisi

Man of the match: Thomas Amasia (Solomon Islands)

=== Tahiti vs Tonga ===
22 August 2023
16:00

Tahiti	26–3	Tonga
Li Fung Kuee 1'; Tepa 2', 4', 13', 13', 19', 22'; Tetauira 3', 26'; Tehau 7'; Torohia 8', 31'; Salem 9', 20', 21', 25', 27', 30'; Labaste 9'; Tinirauarii 20'; Taiarui 22', 34'; Tze-Yu 23', 26', 29'; Tavanae 28'	Report	Tutone 19', 21'; H. Ulavalu 36'

Aorai Tini Hau, Papeete
Attendance: 800
Referee: Hugo Pado (Solomon Islands)

Man of the match: Heirauarii Salem (Tahiti)

=== Tonga vs Fiji ===
23 August 2023
14:00

Tonga	3–21	Fiji
Toetu'u 19'; Tutone 24'; M. Ulavalu 36'	Report	Pal 1', 28'; Waranaivalu 4', 6', 17', 27', 34'; Hughes 5', 9'; Matarerega 7', 22', 27', 30'; Matanisiga 12', 13', 15', 26', 32'; Nand 21'; Singh 24'; Gounder 28'

Aorai Tini Hau, Papeete
Attendance: 400
Referee: Malkom Mayoho (Vanuatu)

Man of the match: Gabiriele Matanisiga (Fiji)

=== Solomon Islands vs Tahiti ===
23 August 2023
16:00

Solomon Islands	3–10	Tahiti
Amasia 3', 30'; Fa’ari 28'	Report	Salem 8', 25', 36'; Tehau 9'; Tepa 17'; Tetauira 19', 31'; Li Fung Kuee 26'; Tavanae 27'; Tinirauarii 29'

Aorai Tini Hau, Papeete
Attendance: 1,000
Referee: Turki Al Sahli (Oman)

Man of the match: Jonathan Torohia (Tahiti)

=== Solomon Islands vs Tonga ===
24 August 2023
14:00

Solomon Islands	15–3	Tonga
Naka 1', 15', 34'; Bobby 2', 10'; Fa’ari 4', 11', 21', 23', 35', 36'; Peter 13', 28', 30'; Suekai 20'	Report	Toetu'u 3', 24'; Bobby 3' (o.g.)

Aorai Tini Hau, Papeete
Attendance: 100
Referee: Abdullah Abdulaziz (Kuwait)

Man of the match: Thompson Peter (Solomon Islands)

=== Tahiti vs Fiji ===
24 August 2023
16:00

Tahiti	5–3	Fiji
Tze-Yu 2', 23'; Tehau 16', 33'; Tetauira 29'	Report	Nand 18'; Matarerega 25', 29'

Aorai Tini Hau, Papeete
Attendance: 500
Referee: Turki Al Sahli (Oman)

Man of the match: Heimanu Taiarui (Tahiti)

== Play-offs ==
=== Third place match ===
26 August 2023
14:00

Fiji	12–0	Tonga
Matarerega 4', 31'; Matanisiga 5', 27', 28', 29', 35', 36'; Hughes 6', 8'; Nand 14'; Gounder 20'	Report

Aorai Tini Hau, Papeete
Attendance: 120
Referee: Hugo Pado (Solomon Islands)

Man of the match: Gabiriele Matanisiga (Fiji)

=== Final ===
26 August 2023
16:00

Tahiti	7–0	Solomon Islands
Salem 1', 5'; Tetauira 4'; Tze-Yu 14'; Labaste 18'; Tehau 19', 23'	Report

Aorai Tini Hau, Papeete
Attendance: 1,080
Referee: Turki Al Sahli (Oman)

Man of the match: Jonathan Torohia (Tahiti)

== Qualified teams for FIFA Beach Soccer World Cup ==
The champion of the 2023 OFC Beach Soccer Nations Cup qualified for the 2023 FIFA Beach Soccer World Cup.

Team	Qualified on	Previous appearances in FIFA Beach Soccer World Cup^{1} only FIFA era (since 2005)
Tahiti	26 August 2023	6 (2011, 2013, 2015, 2017, 2019, 2021)

^{1} Bold indicates champions for that year. Italic indicates hosts for that year.

== Goalscorers ==
There have been 120 goals scored in 8 matches, for an average of 15 goals per match (as of 25 August 2023).

8 goals

- (Solomon Islands) Max Fa'ari

7 goals

- (French Polynesia) Heirauarii Salem
- (French Polynesia) Patrick Tepa
- (French Polynesia) Rainui Tze-Yu

6 goals

- (Fiji) Gabiriele Matanisiga
- (Fiji) Rusiate Matarerega

5 goals

- (Fiji) Tevita Waranaivalu
- (French Polynesia) Tamatoa Tetauira

4 goals

- (Solomon Islands) James Naka
- (Solomon Islands) Thomas Amasia

3 goals

- (Fiji) Ravneel Pal
- (Solomon Islands) Albert Bobby
- (Solomon Islands) Thompson Peter
- (French Polynesia) Roonui Tinirauarii
- (French Polynesia) Teaonui Tehau
- (Tonga) Justin Toetu'u
- (Tonga) Sione Tutone

2 goals

- (Fiji) Bruce Hughes
- (Fiji) Merrill Nand
- (Fiji) Rajneel Singh
- (French Polynesia) Heiarii Tavanae
- (French Polynesia) Heimanu Taiarui
- (French Polynesia) Jonathan Torohia
- (French Polynesia) Raimana Li Fung Kuee

1 goal

- (Fiji) Madhwan Gounder
- (Solomon Islands) Benbasi Suekai
- (French Polynesia) Tearii Labaste
- (Tonga) Harlen Ulavalu
- (Tonga) Mosese Ulavalu

== Broadcasting ==
All matches were broadcast live on the OFC and TNTV official Facebook channels.
