= Matatia Paama =

Tahitian footballer (born 1992)

Personal information
- Date of birth: 3 October 1992 (age 34)
- Place of birth: Tahiti
- Height: 1.77 m (5 ft 10 in)
- Position: Defender

Team information
- Current team: Tahiti United
- Number: 9

Senior career*
Years	Team	Apps	(Gls)
2010–2013	A.S. Central Sport		
2013–2019	A.S. Dragon		
2019–2026	Manu-Ura		(9)
2026–	Tahiti United	1	(0)

International career^{‡}
2016–	Tahiti	17	(1)
Medal record
Men's football
Representing Tahiti
OFC Nations Cup
Third place	2024 Fiji/Vanuatu
Men's Beach soccer
Representing Tahiti
OFC Beach Soccer Nations Cup
Winner	2024 Solomon Islands
- * Club domestic league appearances and goals as of 12 June 2017 ‡ National team caps and goals as of 19 June 2024

Matatia Paama (born 3 October 1992) is a Tahitian footballer who plays as a defender for Tahiti United in the OFC Pro League.

== Honours ==
Tahiti

- OFC Nations Cup: 3rd place, 2024
- OFC Beach Soccer Nations Cup: 2024
