= Daniel Tapeta =

Tahitian footballer (born 1974)

Personal information
- Full name: Daniel Tapeta
- Date of birth: 25 October 1974 (age 52)
- Place of birth: Tahiti
- Position: Goalkeeper

Senior career*
Years	Team	Apps	(Gls)
1997–2011	AS Manu-Ura		

International career^{‡}
1998–2008	Tahiti	17	(0)
Medal record
Men's football
Representing Tahiti
OFC Nations Cup
Third place	2002 New Zealand
- * Club domestic league appearances and goals as of 29 April 2020 ‡ National team caps and goals as of 29 April 2020

Daniel Tapeta (born 25 October 1974) is a footballer who plays as a goalkeeper. He currently plays for AS Manu-Ura in the Tahiti Division Fédérale and the Tahiti national football team.

== Honours ==
Tahiti

- OFC Nations Cup: 3rd place 2002
