= Teva Zaveroni =

Tahitian footballer (born 1975)

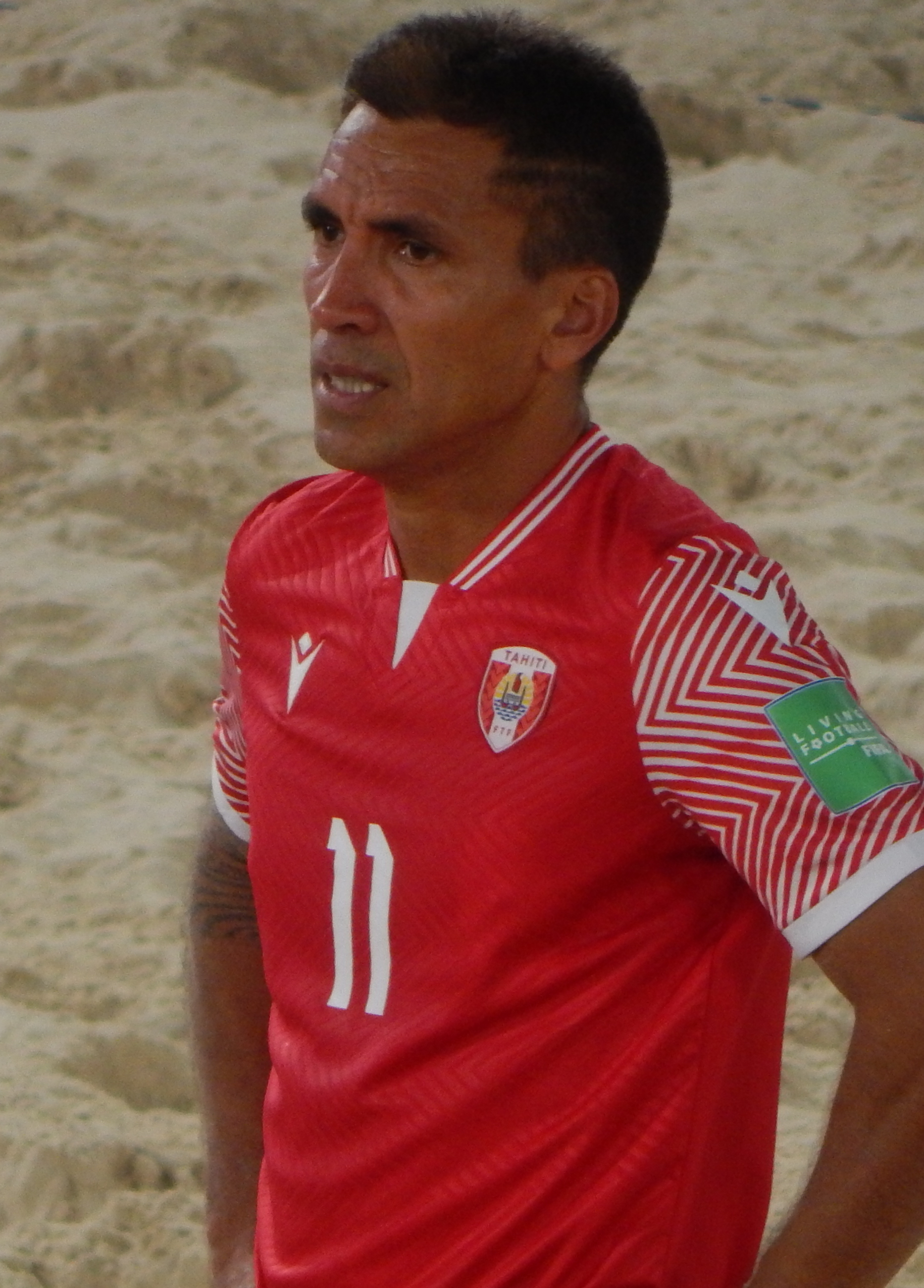
- Zaveroni at the 2021 FIFA Beach Soccer World Cup.

Personal information
- Full name: Daniel Teva Zaveroni
- Date of birth: 10 October 1975 (age 51)
- Place of birth: Tahiti
- Position: Midfielder

Senior career*
Years	Team	Apps	(Gls)
1997–2007	AS Pirae		
2007–2010	AS Taravao		
2010–2014	AS Pirae		

International career^{‡}
1998–2010	Tahiti	19	(1)
Medal record
Men's football
Representing Tahiti (as player)
OFC Nations Cup
Third place	2002 New Zealand
Men's Beach soccer
Representing Tahiti (as player)
FIFA Beach Soccer World Cup
Runner-up	2015 Portugal
Runner-up	2017 Bahamas
OFC Beach Soccer Nations Cup
Winner	2011 Tahiti
Third place	2009 Tahiti
Men's Beach soccer
Representing Tahiti (as manager)
OFC Beach Soccer Nations Cup
Winner	2023 Tahiti
Winner	2024 Solomon Islands
- * Club domestic league appearances and goals as of 14 June 2018 ‡ National team caps and goals as of 14 June 2018

Daniel Teva Zaveroni (born 10 October 1975) in Tahiti is a footballer who plays as a midfielder. He previously played for AS Taravao and AS Pirae. He currently plays for AS Pirae in the Tahiti Division Fédérale and the Tahiti national football team.

In October 2013 he was appointed a knight of the Order of Tahiti Nui.

Zaveroni is the coach of the Tahiti nation's beach soccer team.

== Honours ==
=== Player ===
Tahiti

- OFC Nations Cup: 3rd place, 2002
- FIFA Beach Soccer World Cup: Runner-up, 2015, 2017
- OFC Beach Soccer Nations Cup: 2011; 3rd place, 2009

=== Manager ===
Tahiti

- OFC Beach Soccer Nations Cup: 2023, 2024
