= Alwyn Job =

Vanuatuan professional football manager

Personal information
- Place of birth: Vanuatu

Managerial career
- Years: Team
- 1998: Vanuatu

Alwyn Job is a Vanuatuan professional football manager.

== Career ==
In 1998, he coached the Vanuatu national football team.
