= Jimmy Katoa =

Cook Islands footballer

Personal information
- Full name: Jimmy Katoa
- Date of birth: 26 April 1980 (age 46)
- Place of birth: Cook Islands
- Position: Goalkeeper

Team information
- Current team: Avatiu

Senior career*
Years	Team	Apps	(Gls)
1997	Avatiu		

International career^{‡}
1998	Cook Islands	1	(0)
- * Club domestic league appearances and goals as of 31 July 2013 ‡ National team caps and goals as of 31 July 2013

Jimmy Katoa (born 26 April 1980) in the Cook Islands is a footballer who plays as a defender. He currently plays for Avatiu in the Cook Islands Round Cup and the Cook Islands national football team.
