= Eddy Rousseau =

Tahitian football manager

Personal information
- Place of birth: Tahiti

Managerial career
- Years: Team
- 1997–1998: Tahiti

Eddy Rousseau is a Tahitian professional football manager.

== Career ==
From 1997 until 1998 he coached the Tahiti national football team together with Alain Rousseau.
