= Heimanu Taiarui =

Tahitian beach soccer player (born 1986)

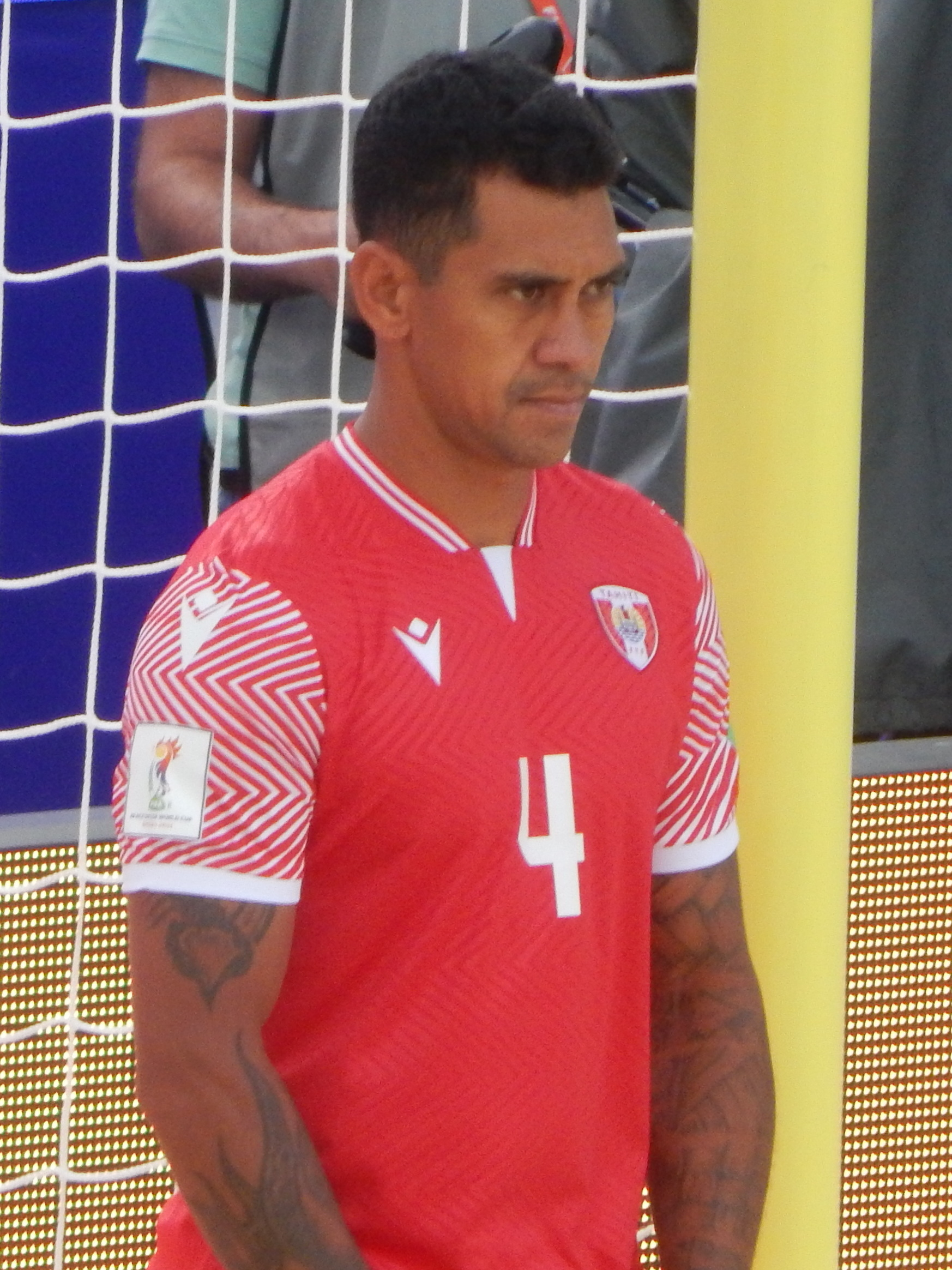
- Taiarui at the 2021 World Cup.

Personal information
- Full name: Heimanu Philippe Taiarui
- Date of birth: 24 August 1986 (age 40)
- Place of birth: Papeete, Tahiti, French Polynesia
- Height: 1.77 m (5 ft 10 in)
- Position: Defender

International career
Years	Team	Apps	(Gls)
2011–	Tahiti		
Medal record
Men's Beach soccer
Representing Tahiti
FIFA Beach Soccer World Cup
Runner-up	2015 Portugal
Runner-up	2017 Bahamas
OFC Beach Soccer Nations Cup
Winner	2011 Tahiti
Winner	2019 Tahiti
Winner	2023 Tahiti

Heimanu Philippe Taiarui (born 24 August 1986) is a beach soccer and association football player from French Polynesia who plays as a defender. He has appeared at six editions of the FIFA Beach Soccer World Cup representing the Tahitian national team, finishing as a runner-up twice (2015 and 2017); at the former, he won the Golden Ball (best player) award.

== Biography ==
=== Early life ===
Taiarui was born in Papeete. His father is from Mahina and his mother is from Papara; Taiarui grew up in the latter. He comes from a sporting family; both his parents played association football, with his mother having been the captain of the Tahitian women's team. His sister has also made appearances for the women's national team. Thus, Taiarui naturally found himself also engaged with football.

As a youth, along with football, Taiarui also frequently indulged in his passions for triathlon, surfing (competing in competitions alongside Michel Bourez) and motocross, a sport in which he "excelled". However his parents were not enthused with him pursuing these sport's seriously. His mother's persistence ultimately gave him the "bug" for football and he joined the junior teams of A.S. Manu-Ura. At 14, he went to play in a youth tournament in France and was shown interest by Bordeaux and Nantes, but he quickly returned to Tahiti due to the lack of any family there.

=== Career ===
Whilst Taiarui played football on the beaches casually with friends, using sticks and slippers as goalposts, his journey into organised beach soccer only began in 2011. The Tahitian Football Federation (FTF) was holding trials in view of the 2011 OFC Beach Soccer Championship, the Oceanian qualifying event for the 2011 FIFA Beach Soccer World Cup, and Taiarui decided to participate. He impressed Swiss coach Angelo Schirinzi who was in attendance. Schirinzi offered him the chance to play with his club in Switzerland for a few months, which Taiarui accepted. He "loved" the experience, and was ultimately part of the Tahiti squad at said qualifiers and in their first appearance at the World Cup in September.

Schirinzi began inviting Taiarui to play in the Swiss National League each year. At the 2013 World Cup, hosted in Tahiti itself, Taiarui was labelled a "darling" and "touch[ed] hearts" with the home crowd, playing a crucial role in Tahiti's historic semi-final run, leading the Haka before each match; albeit on one occasion, he jumped over the hoardings to celebrate with the crowd after a goal, resulting in a yellow card and a suspension. Following the unprecedented success of the team, Taiarui, along with the rest of the Tahitian squad, were appointed as knights of the Order of Tahiti Nui in October 2013. Meanwhile, Taiarui continued to play football in Tahiti, moving from his boyhood club of Manu-Ura to A.S. Pirae in 2014, making appearances in the OFC Champions League.

In 2015, Taiarui's career and fame exploded. Tahiti made the 2015 World Cup final, and his performances earned him the Golden Ball (best player). He was in such a state of disbelief at winning the award, that he needed great encouragement to step forward and receive it. Taiarui was then voted as one of the world's best three players at the 2015 Beach Soccer Stars awards ceremony and was named as part of the world dream team for that year. As a result of the Golden Ball, he suddenly found himself being recognised on the streets of Papeete and being stopped for autographs. He also started receiving offers to play for beach soccer clubs across the globe and subsequently had spells with teams in Portugal, Germany, Italy, Spain, Estonia and Japan over the next two years, achieving semi-pro status. Despite the award elevating his beach soccer career, he also admits it came with a lot of pressure to prove that he "didn't just get it by mistake", and that it sometimes felt like a burden.

Soon after the 2017 World Cup, in which Tahiti reached the final once again, Taiarui moved to Switzerland permanently, allowing him to compete in European beach soccer leagues with more ease. After a short time, Taiarui moved just over the border into France and took a place at a club in the lower leagues of French football to maintain his fitness when not competing in beach soccer.

In 2019, the magazine France Football (who award the Ballon d'Or in football) placed Taiarui seventh in an article named "10 Legends of Beach Soccer". His eligibility for such a prestigious list was, however, questioned. At the 2021 World Cup, Taiarui picked up an injury in Tahiti's second match against Spain, meaning he was unable to make any meaningful contribution in the competition any further.

== Style of play ==
Taiarui has been described as a "great craftsmen" of the recent game and an "all-round player", having a good sense of positioning and an ability for link-up play. His aerial skills and long range shots are also noted, as well as his adherence to fair play principles.

== Personal life ==
Taiarui is known by the nickname "Metal", bestowed upon him due to being perceived as a "hard-man". Zinedine Zidane was his boyhood football idol.

Aged 20, Taiarui decided to become a fisherman, having been inspired by outings with his grandmother and father when he was younger. He eventually became an owner of his own poti marara (Polynesian fishing boat). He has a genuine love for fishing, particularly enjoying the tranquillity and solitude of the open ocean.

In 2016, he was involved in helping to revive a woman who had suffered a cardiac arrest in a train station in Switzerland. He was again involved in a life-saving incident later that year, responsible for rescuing two people who had been lost at sea near Tahiti for seven days, having come across them whilst out finishing on his boat.

In 2017, Taiarui left angling behind as he moved to Delémont, Switzerland due to more compatible job opportunities with his European beach soccer career, taking a job as a welder in Basel. Feeling claustrophobic, he moved to the nearby Sundgau region of France in 2019; as of then, he lives there with his partner, three children and eight dogs. He occasionally returns to Tahiti to see family and meet up with the national squad. Taiarui married his girlfriend in his hometown of Papara, Tahiti in 2022.

== Statistics ==
Competition	Year	Apps	Goals	Ref.
FIFA Beach Soccer World Cup
FIFA Beach Soccer World Cup	(Italy) 2011	3	0	
FIFA Beach Soccer World Cup	(French Polynesia) 2013	4	4	
FIFA Beach Soccer World Cup	(Portugal) 2015	6	4	
FIFA Beach Soccer World Cup	(The Bahamas) 2017	5	1	
FIFA Beach Soccer World Cup	(Paraguay) 2019	3	2	
FIFA Beach Soccer World Cup	(Russia) 2021	3	2	
Total		24	13	—

== Honours ==
As of 2023.

The following is a selection, not an exhaustive list, of the major international honours Taiarui has achieved:

=== Player ===
Tahiti

- FIFA Beach Soccer World Cup: Runner-up, 2015, 2017
- OFC Beach Soccer Nations Cup: 2011, 2019, 2023
- Intercontinental Cup Runner-up, 2015

=== Individual ===
- FIFA Beach Soccer World Cup: Best Player, 2015
- OFC Beach Soccer Nations Cup: Best Player, 2019
- Beach Soccer Stars: World's top 3 best players, 2015; World dream team: 2015
- Orders
  - Knight of the Order of Tahiti Nui (since 2013)
