= Jonathan Torohia =

Tahiti association football player (born 1985)

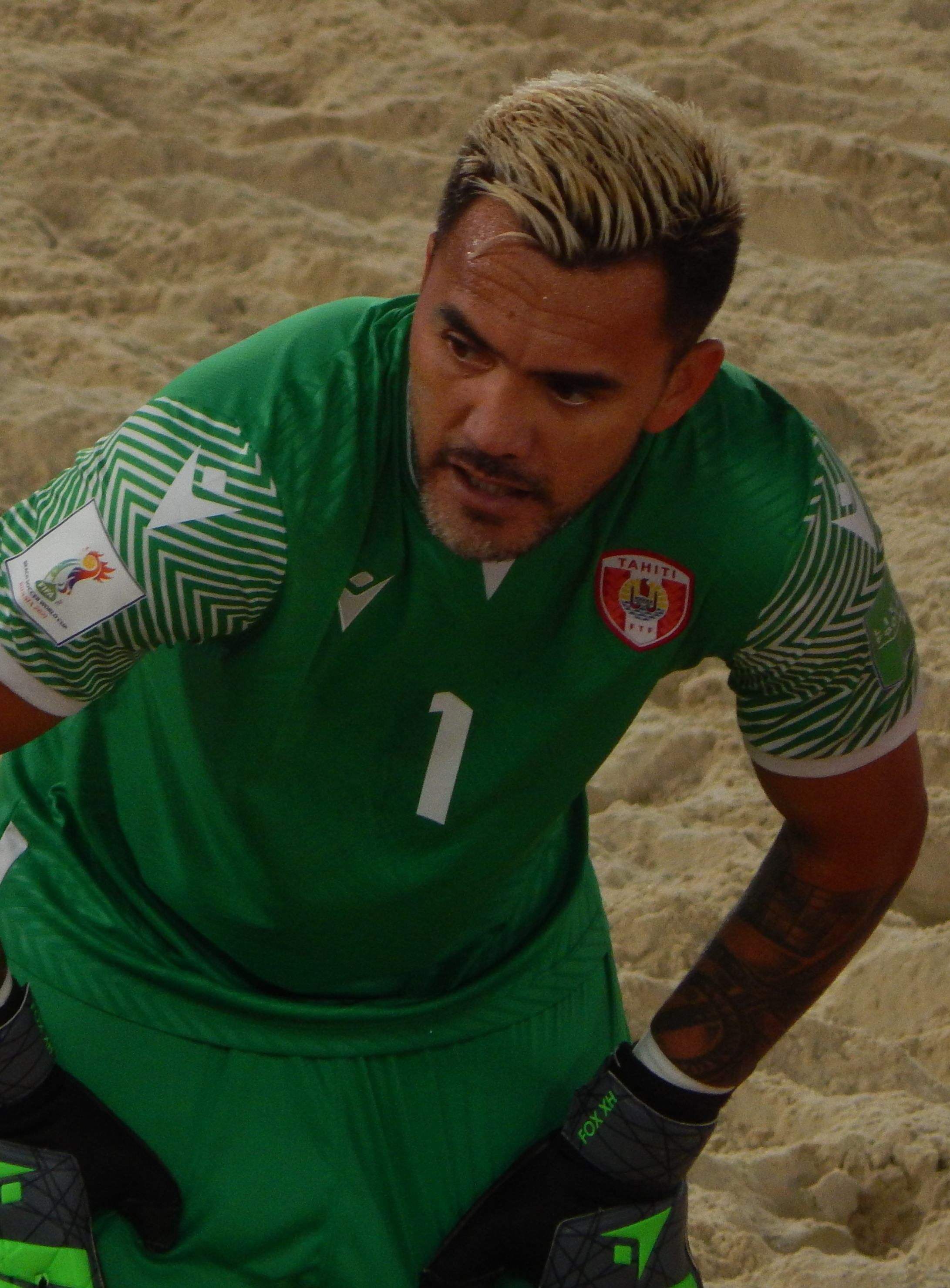
- Torohia at the 2021 FIFA Beach Soccer World Cup.

Personal information
- Date of birth: 22 February 1985 (age 41)
- Place of birth: Papeete, Tahiti
- Height: 1.88 m (6 ft 2 in)
- Position: Goalkeeper

Team information
- Current team: Manu-Ura

Senior career*
| Years | Team | Apps | (Gls) |
| 2006–2017 | Pirae | | |
| 2017– | Manu-Ura | | |

International career^{‡}
| 2007– | Tahiti | 3 | (0) |
Medal record
Men's Beach soccer
Representing Tahiti
OFC Beach Soccer Nations Cup
| Winner | 2011 Tahiti |
| Winner | 2019 Tahiti |
| Winner | 2023 Tahiti |
- * Club domestic league appearances and goals ‡ National team caps and goals as of 1 April 2021

Jonathan Torohia (born 22 February 1985) is a Tahitian footballer and beach soccer player who plays as a goalkeeper for Manu-Ura and the Tahiti national beach soccer team.

== Career ==
=== International ===
Torohia made his senior international debut on 3 September 2007 in a 1-0 World Cup qualifying victory over the Cook Islands.

=== Beach ===
Torohia also competes with the Tahitian national beach soccer team. After impressing at the 2013 FIFA Beach Soccer World Cup, Torohia joined Barcelona for the 2013 Mundialito de Clubes. At the 2015 edition of the Beach Soccer World Cup, Torohia was named the best goalkeeper as Tahiti finished runners-up.

In October 2013 he was appointed a knight of the Order of Tahiti Nui.

== Career statistics ==
=== International ===
As of matches played 23 March 2018.

| National team | Year | Apps | Goals |
|---|---|---|---|
| Tahiti | 2007 | 1 | 0 |
| Tahiti | 2018 | 2 | 0 |
| Total | | 3 | 0 |

== Honours ==
Tahiti

- OFC Beach Soccer Nations Cup: 2011, 2019, 2023
