= Raimana Li Fung Kuee =

Tahitian footballer (born 1985)

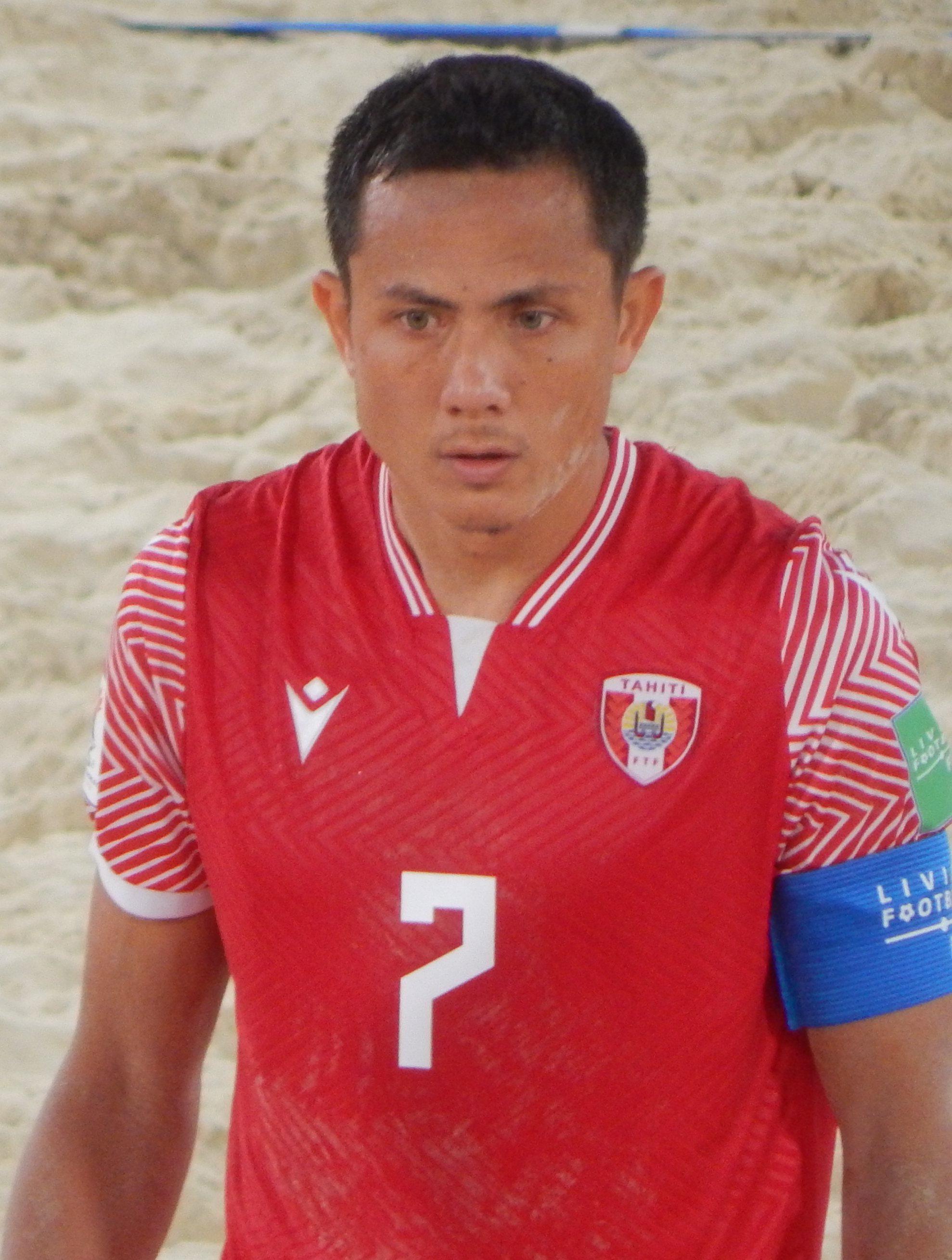
- Li Fung Kuee with Tahiti at the 2021 FIFA Beach Soccer World Cup

Personal information
- Full name: Raimana John Li Fung Kuee
- Date of birth: 10 April 1985 (age 41)
- Place of birth: Tahiti
- Height: 5 ft 8 in (1.73 m)
- Position: Striker

Team information
- Current team: A.S. Pirae
- Number: 7

Youth career
- 2003–2004: FC Nantes B

Senior career*
Years	Team	Apps	(Gls)
2004–2014	AS Dragon		
2014–	A.S. Pirae		(30)

International career
2007–2022	Tahiti	9	(2)
Medal record
Men's Beach soccer
Representing Tahiti
FIFA Beach Soccer World Cup
Runner-up	2015 Portugal
Runner-up	2017 Bahamas
OFC Beach Soccer Nations Cup
Winner	2011 Tahiti
Winner	2019 Tahiti
Winner	2023 Tahiti
Winner	2024 Solomon Islands
Third place	2006 Tahiti
Third place	2009 Tahiti
- * Club domestic league appearances and goals

Raimana John Li Fung Kuee (born 10 April 1985) is a Tahitian footballer and beach soccer player currently playing for A.S. Pirae, where he plays as a striker.

He received a silver medal with the Tahiti national team after losing the final against the Portugal national team during the 2015 FIFA Beach Soccer World Cup in Espinho, Portugal. He received the bronze ball award during the 2013 FIFA Beach Soccer World Cup in Tahiti, French Polynesia. In 2014-2015 he became league Top Scorer with 30 goals while playing for A.S. Pirae.

In October 2013 he was appointed a knight of the Order of Tahiti Nui.

== International career ==
=== International goals ===
Scores and results list Tahiti's goal tally first.

No	Date	Venue	Opponent	Score	Result	Competition
1.	23 September 2010	Parc des Sports des Maisons Rouges, Paris, France	Martinique	1–0	1–4	2010 Coupe de l'Outre-Mer
2.	24 March 2018	Stade Pater Te Hono Nui, Pirae, Tahiti	New Caledonia	1–0	4–3	Friendly

== Honours ==
Tahiti

- FIFA Beach Soccer World Cup: Runner-up, 2015, 2017
- OFC Beach Soccer Nations Cup: 2011, 2019, 2023, 2024; 3rd place, 2006, 2009
