= Madhwan Gounder =

Fijian footballer

Personal information
- Full name: Madhwan Gounder
- Place of birth: Fiji

Madhwan Gounder is a soccer player who played for Rewa F.C. in the 2017 Fiji National Football League.
