= Tamatoa Tetauira =

Tahitian footballer (born 1996)

Personal information
- Full name: Jacques Tamatoa Hoarii Tetauira
- Date of birth: 17 April 1996 (age 30)
- Place of birth: Papeete, Tahiti, French Polynesia
- Height: 1.87 m (6 ft 2 in)
- Position: Midfielder

Team information
- Current team: Dragon

Senior career*
Years	Team	Apps	(Gls)
2015–	Dragon	67	(81)
2019–2021	Vénus	13	(10)
2021–	A.F. Muespach		
2022-2023	Pirae	23	(19)

International career^{‡}
2015–	Tahiti	11	(5)
Medal record
Men's football
Representing Tahiti
Pacific Games
Silver medal – second place	2015 Papua New Guinea
OFC Beach Soccer Nations Cup
Winner	2023 Tahiti
Winner	2024 Solomon Islands
- * Club domestic league appearances and goals as of 27 February 2025 ‡ National team caps and goals as of 18 July 2019

Tamatoa Tetauira (born 17 April 1996) is an BBM Tahitian international footballer who plays as a midfielder for Pirae in the Tahiti Ligue 1.

== International career ==
=== International goals ===
Scores and results list Tahiti's goal tally first.

No.	Date	Venue	Opponent	Score	Result	Competition
1.	10 July 2019	National Soccer Stadium, Apia, Samoa	Tuvalu	4–0	7–0	2019 Pacific Games
2.	12 July 2019	National Soccer Stadium, Apia, Samoa	Solomon Islands	1–0	3–0	2019 Pacific Games
3.	18 July 2019	National Soccer Stadium, Apia, Samoa	American Samoa	2–0	8–1	2019 Pacific Games
4.	18 July 2019	National Soccer Stadium, Apia, Samoa	American Samoa	3–0	8–1	2019 Pacific Games
5.	18 July 2019	National Soccer Stadium, Apia, Samoa	American Samoa	8–1	8–1	2019 Pacific Games

== Honours ==
Tahiti

- OFC Beach Soccer Nations Cup: 2023, 2024

Tahiti U-23

- Pacific Games: Silver Medalist, 2015
