= Levante UD (beach soccer) =

Levante
- Full name: Levante UD Fútbol Playa
- Founded: 26 June 2013; 11 years ago
- Ground: Playa de Patacona (training)
- Coach: Enrique Sánchez
- League: Liga Nacional
- 2019: Liga Nacional, 1st of 14
- Website: https://www.levanteud.com/es/tag/levante-ud-fp
Home colours
Away colours

Levante Unión Deportiva Fútbol Playa is a beach soccer club based in Valencia, Spain. Founded in 2013, the team is the official beach soccer department of Levante UD association football club. The club competes in the Spanish National Beach Soccer League (Liga Nacional de Fútbol Playa), Copa RFEF and international competitions.

The club has won two league titles and as of February 2020, is ranked as the second best club side in Europe.

== Squad ==
2019 National League squad.

Note: Flags indicate national team as defined under FIFA eligibility rules; some limited exceptions apply. Players may hold more than one non-FIFA nationality.

No.	Pos.	Nation	Player
1	GK	(Spain) ESP	Víctor Viala
3	MF	(Italy) ITA	Salvatore Sanfilippo
4	DF	(Spain) ESP	Iván Latorre
6	FW	(Spain) ESP	Eduard Suárez
7	DF	(Spain) ESP	Enrique Moratal
8	MF	(Spain) ESP	Daniel Pajón
9	FW	(Spain) ESP	Jonathan Fernández
10	DF	(Spain) ESP	Antonio Mayor
11	FW	(Spain) ESP	José Miralles

No.	Pos.	Nation	Player
14	FW	(Spain) ESP	José Enrique
15	MF	(Spain) ESP	Adri Frutos
16	FW	(Spain) ESP	Pablo Perez
18	MF	(England) ENG	Aaron Clarke
19	FW	(Spain) ESP	Fernando Guisado
21	GK	(Spain) ESP	Dona
—	MF	(Spain) ESP	Antonio Aceiton
—	MF	(Spain) ESP	Juan López

Coach: (Spain) Enrique Sánchez

== Achievements ==
=== Domestic competitions ===
- Liga Nacional

- Winners (2): 2018, 2019
- Runners-up (1): 2017

- Copa RFEF

- Winners (1): 2019
- Runners-up (2): 2015, 2018
- Third place (1): 2017

- Supercopa de España

- Winners (1): 2019

=== International competitions ===
- Euro Winners Cup

- Third place (1): 2019

- World Winners Cup

- Third place (1): 2019

== See also ==
- Levante UD Femenino
- Levante UD (futsal)
