= 2011 OFC Beach Soccer Championship =

2011 FIFA Beach Soccer World Cup qualification (OFC)

Tournament details
- Host country: Tahiti
- Dates: 23–26 February 2011
- Teams: 3 (from 1 confederation)
- Venue: 1 (in 1 host city)

Final positions
- Champions: Tahiti (1st title)
- Runners-up: Solomon Islands
- Third place: Fiji

Tournament statistics
- Matches played: 4
- Goals scored: 36 (9 per match)
- Attendance: 5,125 (1,281 per match)
- Top scorer(s): (Solomon Islands) James Naka (Solomon Islands) Robert Laua (Fiji) Jo Dugucagi (4 goals each)
- Best player: (Solomon Islands) James Naka
- Best goalkeeper: (French Polynesia) Jonathan Torohia
- Fair play award: Fiji

The 2011 OFC Beach Soccer Championship took place from 23 February to 26 February 2011, in Papeete, Tahiti, It acted as a qualifier for the 2011 FIFA Beach Soccer World Cup. This was the third time the island had hosted the competition, following the 2006 and 2009 tournaments in Moorea. Only the winners of the tournament, Tahiti, qualified to play in the 2011 FIFA Beach Soccer World Cup. The Solomon Islands were the favorites, having won the last 3 other qualifying championships in 2006, 2007 and 2009, but surprisingly lost in the final to Tahiti, despite beating them in the group stage. This means for the first time since 2005, the Solomon Islands will not be representing Oceania at the world cup.

All matches were held at the new Jardin de Paofai complex in Papeete, which was opened on 15 February 2011.

== Participating teams ==
Four teams decided to enter into the tournament to compete for the one spot in the 2011 FIFA Beach Soccer World Cup. These were the same nations who competed in the 2009 OFC Beach Soccer Championship.

Unfortunately, due to a cyclone recently passing through the region, the Vanuatu national team was stranded at their airport as they were about to leave for Tahiti to attend the tournament. As a result, they were forced to withdraw from the tournament.

Participating:

- Fiji
- Solomon Islands
- Tahiti

Withdrawing:

- Vanuatu

== Group stage ==
The group stage was going to begin on 22 February but due to the cyclone which forced Vanuatu to withdraw, it commenced on 23 February with no rest day and consisted of each nation playing each other once in a single round-robin format.

All kickoff times are listed as Tahitian local time, (UTC-10).

Team	Pld	W	W+	L	GF	GA	GD	Pts
Solomon Islands	2	2	0	0	13	5	+8	6
Tahiti	2	1	0	1	7	9	−2	3
Fiji	2	0	0	2	9	15	−6	0

23 February 2011
12:30

Solomon Islands	9 – 4	Fiji
Naka 4', 26'; Ne'e 6', 19', 32'; Laua 15', 22', 34'; Aisa 18'	Report	Dugucagi 10', 29'; Ratan 30'; Watkins 33'

Jardin de Paofai, Papeete
Attendance: 1 275
Referee: (Vanuatu) Alain Alick

24 February 2011
12:30

Tahiti	6 – 5	Fiji
Lehartel 20'; Bennett 27'; Izal 28', 35'; Zaveroni 29'; Dunadamu (O.G) 33'	Report	Nair 14'; Raju 20'; Dugucagi 22', 34'; Dunadamu 36'

Jardin de Paofai, Papeete
Attendance: 1 450
Referee: (Solomon Islands) Hugo Hebala

25 February 2011
12:30

Tahiti	1 – 4	Solomon Islands
Tepa 34'	Report	Aisa 12'; Muri 12', 20'; Laua 32'

Jardin de Paofai, Papeete
Attendance: 1 000
Referee: (Fiji) Rajnish Dave

== Tournament final ==
26 February 2011
12:30

Solomon Islands	3 – 4	Tahiti
Muri 1'; Naka 28', 32'	Report	Tepa 5'; Izal 8'; Bennett 9'; Amau 24'

Jardin de Paofai, Papeete
Attendance: 1 400
Referee: (Fiji) Rajnish Dave

== Winners ==
(2011) FIFA Beach Soccer World Cup
Qualification (OFC) Winners:

Tahiti
First title

== Awards ==
Best Player (MVP)
(Solomon Islands) James Naka
Top Scorer(s)
(Solomon Islands) James Naka	(Solomon Islands) Robert Laua	(Fiji) Jo Dugucagi
4 goals
Best Goalkeeper
(French Polynesia) Jonathan Torohia
FIFA Fair Play Award
Fiji

== Team qualifying ==
	Team
1st Place	Tahiti

== Top scorers ==
4 goals

- (Solomon Islands) James Naka
- (Fiji) Jo Dugucagi
- (Solomon Islands) Robert Laua

3 goals

- (Solomon Islands) Franco Ne'e
- (French Polynesia) Teiva Izal
- (Solomon Islands) Nicholas Muri

2 goals

- (Solomon Islands) McPhillip Aisa
- (French Polynesia) Naea Bennett
- (French Polynesia) Patrick Tepa

2 goals (cont.)

- (Fiji) Rajnesh Ratu (Ratan)

1 goal

- (French Polynesia) Teva Zaveroni
- (Fiji) Archie Watkins
- (French Polynesia) Tainui Lehartel
- (Fiji) Maciu Dunadamu
- (Fiji) Sandeep Nair
- (French Polynesia) Marama Amau

Own Goal

- (Fiji) Maciu Dunadamu (for (French Polynesia) Tahiti)

== Final standings ==
Rank	Team
1	Tahiti
2	Solomon Islands
3	Fiji
