= Mão =

Brazilian beach soccer player

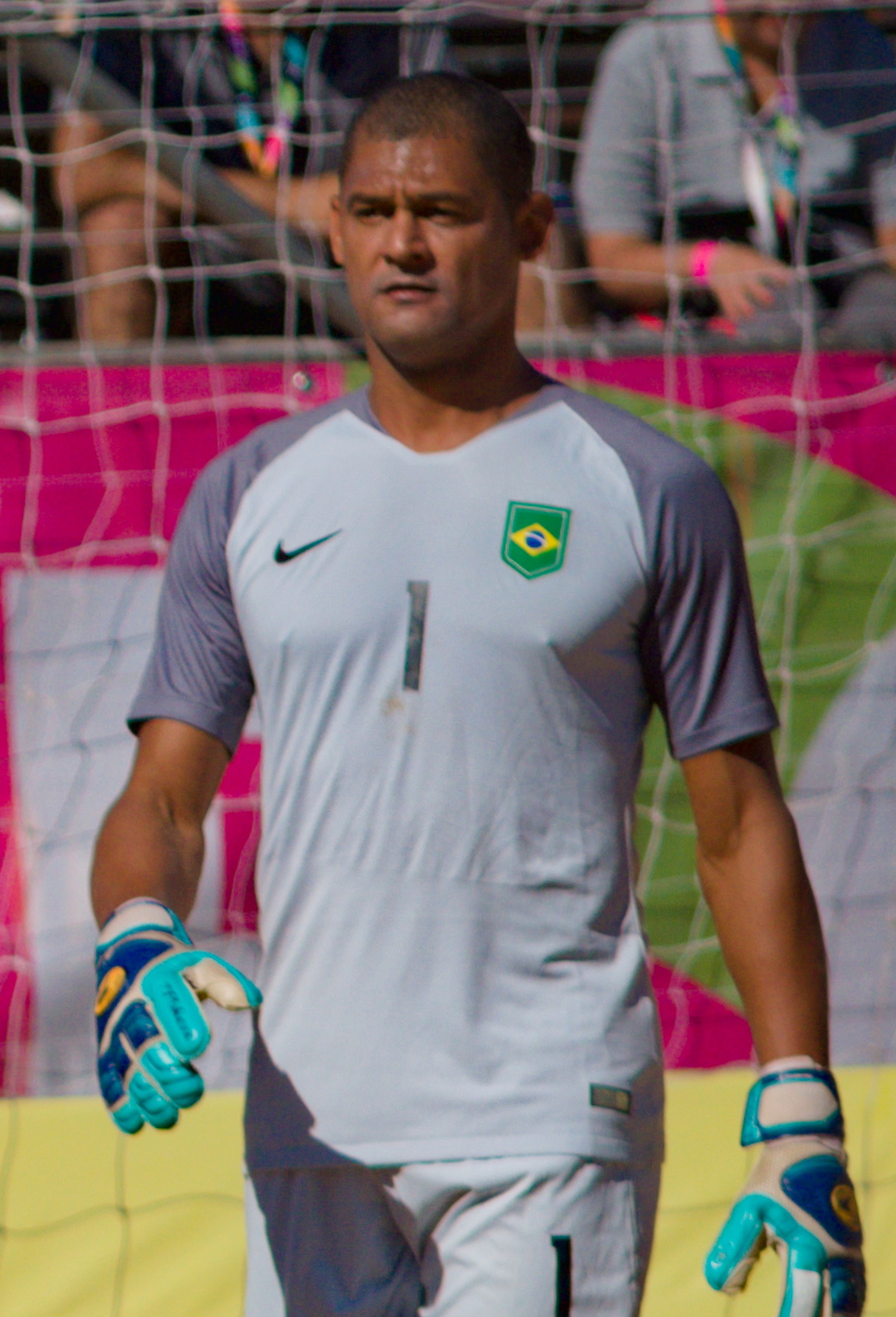
- Mão at the 2019 South American Beach Games.

Personal information
- Full name: Jenílson Brito Rodrigues
- Date of birth: 6 December 1978 (age 47)
- Place of birth: Serra, Brazil
- Height: 1.86 m (6 ft 1 in)
- Position: Goalkeeper

International career^{‡}
| Years | Team | Apps | (Gls) |
| 2004–2026 | Brazil | 394 | (26) |
- ‡ National team caps and goals as of 15 October 2023

Jenílson Brito Rodrigues (born 6 December 1978), better known as Mão, is a Brazilian former beach soccer player who played as a goalkeeper. He is a record five-time winner of the FIFA Beach Soccer World Cup (2006, 2007, 2008, 2009, 2017) and won the Golden Glove (best goalkeeper) award at Dubai 2009. Additionally, he holds the record for the most appearances at the World Cup and indeed all FIFA competitions (52), and is the most capped-Brazilian player ever.

== Career ==
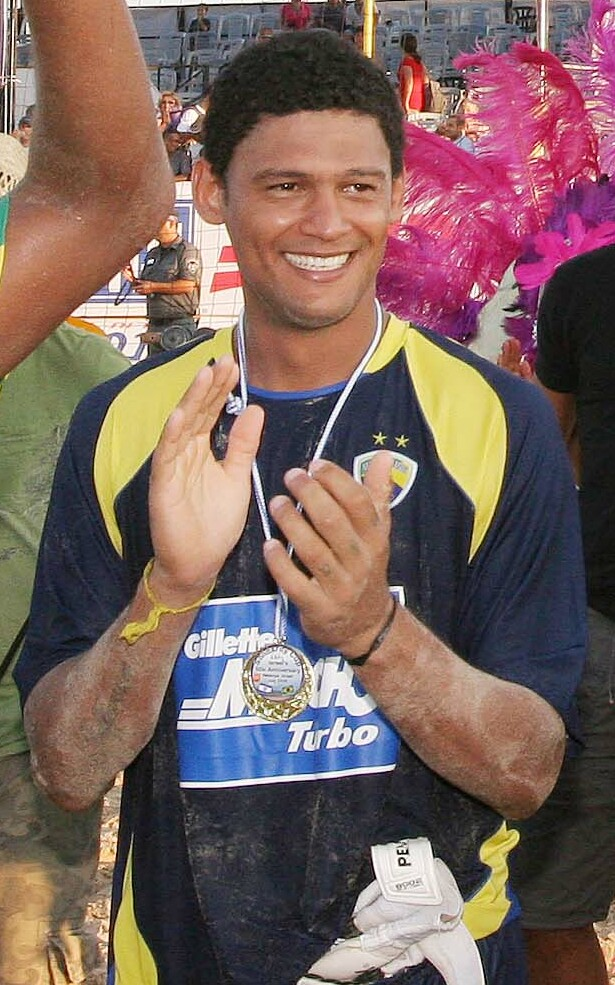
Mão in 2008

Mão has stated his desire was always to be a goalkeeper. He came from a poor background and therefore had to borrow a friend's bicycle to attend training whilst also sourcing second hand gloves and boots. Ultimately, he couldn't afford proper training sessions for 11-a-side football and thus switched to futsal.

He ultimately entered professional beach soccer in 2000, aged 21, in his home state of Espírito Santo. Due to a higher standard of professionalism in Rio de Janeiro, Mão sought out a move to the city's beach soccer team in 2003, coached by Alexandre Soares. He was first called up to the Brazil national team in 2004, aged 25. At first, he was subordinate to Robertinho and Pierre; included in Brazil's 15-man shortlist for the 2004 World Championships, Mão was ultimately one of three players left out of the final squad, with the aforementioned preferred over him. He was shortlisted again for the 2005 World Cup, but found himself cut from the final 12 once more. However, in the summer of 2005, Alexandre Soares became Brazil's new manager and made major changes to the squad, shunning longstanding squad members such as Robertinho, with Soares favouring Mão instead. He subsequently attended his first World Cup in 2006, a tournament Brazil won, and has been Brazil's first choice goalkeeper ever since, winning another three back-to-back World Cups in 2007, 2008 and 2009.

At the latter World Cup in Dubai, Mão made his 100th appearance for Brazil in the group stage versus Bahrain and was ultimately voted as the best goalkeeper of the tournament, winning the coveted Golden Glove award. Mão then reached 150 caps in August 2011 against Chile at the South American World Cup qualifiers. In December, at the South American Beach Games, he fractured a finger on his right hand, forcing him to be unable to represent Brazil for the first time in over five years. 200 games for Brazil was achieved in an 8–3 victory against Senegal at the 2013 World Cup.

In 2014, Mão claimed he was a victim of verbal racist abuse by an unnamed Uruguayan player in a 9–3 win at the South American Beach Games, the first time he experienced such abuse in his career.

Mão's 250th appearance for Brazil was realised in January 2016 at the Copa Sudamericana. In May 2017, Mão became a world champion for a record fifth time, as Brazil won the 2017 World Cup in the Bahamas; he was the only surviving squad member from Brazil's last World Cup triumph eight years prior. Later that year, in November, he became just the third Brazilian player to reach 300 caps, when playing against Iran in the semi-finals of the 2017 Intercontinental Cup, and was named as part of the world team of the year just days later at the Beach Soccer Stars awards ceremony.

Mão has since gone on to make more appearances for Brazil than any other player, surpassing Benjamin's previous record of 339, reaching 350 caps in a 9–7 victory against Portugal at the 2019 World Cup for which he received a commemorative shirt. Days later, he became the first player to reach the milestone of 50 appearances at the FIFA Beach Soccer World Cup in the quarter-finals against Russia, a game in which he scored but Brazil ultimately lost. That year, Mão also stated his intention to continue playing until 2023; indeed, whilst he had still been active for Brazil as recently as at the Mundialito in October 2023, he was not picked, however, for the 2024 World Cup a few months later (now aged 45), making it the first time in 19 years that a Brazil squad at the World Cup did not feature him.

== Style of play ==
Mão has been described as being an on-field perfectionist and thus having a "grumpy" persona during matches. His daughter has highlighted his lack of positive emotion and has encouraged him to "smile more" during games. His stature, goal coverage, and ability to intimidate attackers has been noted by Madjer, who said of Mão, "Here came that big guy. I look at the goal and the ball has nowhere to go in the goal. How am I going to take the ball away from this guy?"

== Personal life ==
Rodrigues says his nickname, Mão, is commonly misconceived to have been bestowed upon him due to his status as a goalkeeper (mão meaning "hand" in Portuguese). In reality, as a child, he struggled with pronouncing "irmão" (meaning "brother" in Portuguese) when referring to his older sibling, instead only being capable of enunciating the latter half, "mão". This led to Rodrigues himself being labelled "Mão", a nickname which has remained with him ever since.

As a teenager, he discovered his father, an alcoholic, dead in a makeshift rubbish dump near his home. He claims this experience cemented in his mind the importance of pursuing his dream of becoming a footballer. He decided to tell his mother of his ambition, who was unimpressed and proceeded to beat him.

Mão has multiple degrees in physical education and has four children. As of 2023, he was a university professor in sports and was also studying a post-graduate degree. He has also worked on multiple social projects with young people, with the aim of "promot[ing] social transformations through sport", and social programmes for the elderly.

He describes his life as "... church, home and training. I don't go clubbing, I don't drink, I don't smoke, and I'm very family [orientated]. I ask God every day to help me."

== Politics ==
Mão has twice run as a candidate to become a councillor in his hometown of Serra under the guise of "Goalkeeper Mão"; firstly in the 2016 municipal elections as a member of the Brazilian Social Democracy Party, and secondly in the 2020 municipal elections as a member of the Solidariedade party. He was unelected on both occasions. In 2016 he received 429 votes and in 2020, 750 votes.

== Statistics ==
| Competition | Year | Apps | Goals | Ref. |
|---|---|---|---|---|
| FIFA Beach Soccer World Cup | (Brazil) 2006 | 6 | 0 | |
| FIFA Beach Soccer World Cup | (Brazil) 2007 | 6 | 0 | |
| FIFA Beach Soccer World Cup | (France) 2008 | 6 | 0 | |
| FIFA Beach Soccer World Cup | (United Arab Emirates) 2009 | 6 | 0 | |
| FIFA Beach Soccer World Cup | (Italy) 2011 | 6 | 0 | |
| FIFA Beach Soccer World Cup | (French Polynesia) 2013 | 6 | 0 | |
| FIFA Beach Soccer World Cup | (Portugal) 2015 | 4 | 1 | |
| FIFA Beach Soccer World Cup | (The Bahamas) 2017 | 6 | 1 | |
| FIFA Beach Soccer World Cup | (Paraguay) 2019 | 4 | 1 | |
| FIFA Beach Soccer World Cup | (Russia) 2021 | 2 | 0 | |
| Total | | 52 | 3 | — |

== Honours ==
As of May 2022

The following is a selection, not an exhaustive list, of the major honours Mão has achieved:

=== Country ===
Global

- FIFA Beach Soccer World Cup
  - Winner (5): 2006, 2007, 2008, 2009, 2017
- World Beach Games
  - Winner (1): 2019
- Intercontinental Cup
  - Winner (3): 2014, 2016, 2017
- Mundialito
  - Winner (7): 2005, 2006, 2007, 2010, 2011, 2016, 2017

Regional

- CONMEBOL qualifiers for the FIFA Beach Soccer World Cup
  - Winner (8): 2006, 2008, 2009, 2011, 2015, 2017, 2019, 2021
- Copa América
  - Winner (2): 2016, 2018
- South American Beach Games
  - Winner (4): 2009, 2011, 2014, 2019
- South American Beach Soccer League
  - Winner (3): 2017, 2018, 2019
- Copa Latina
  - Winner (3): 2005, 2006, 2009

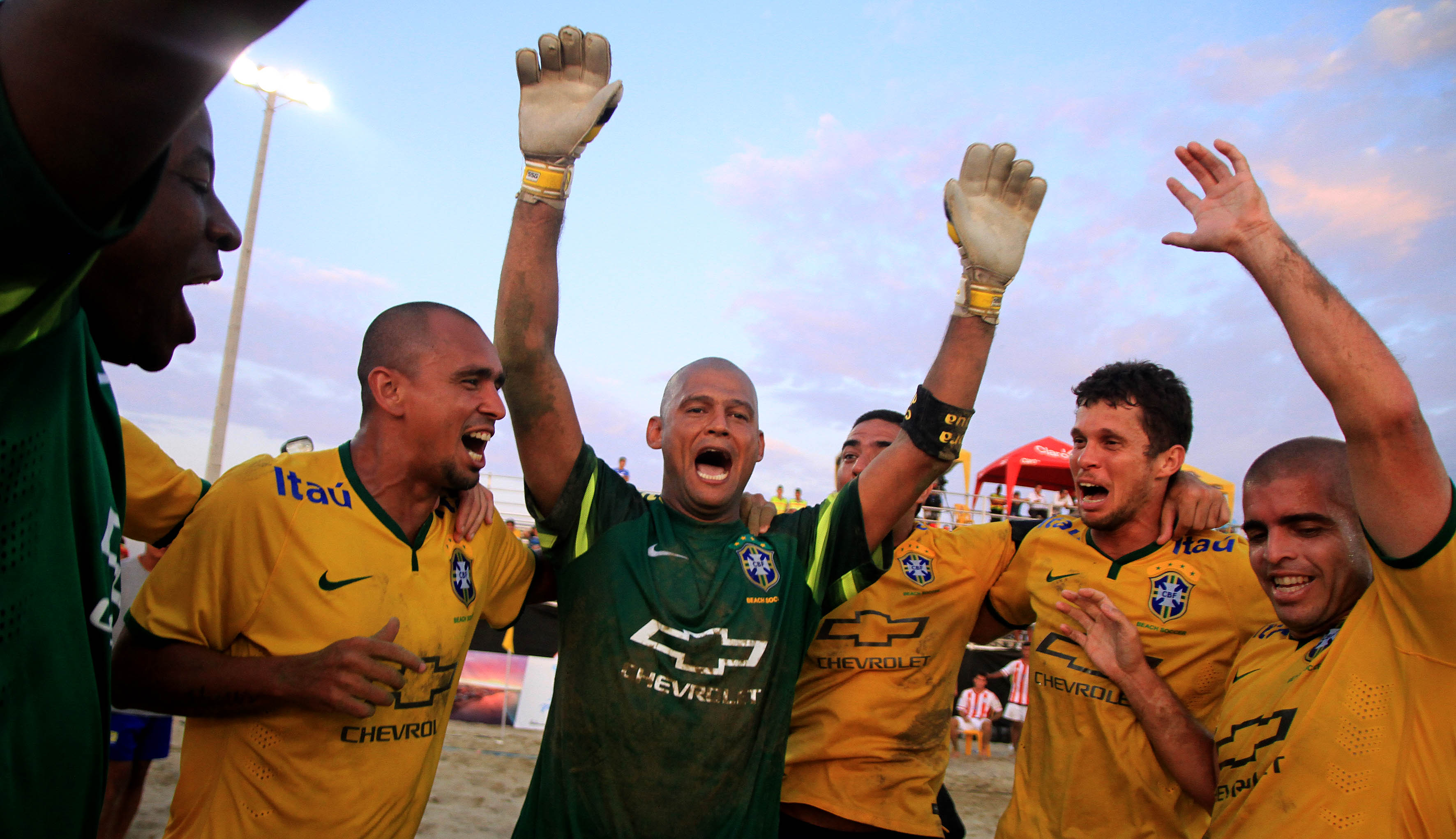
Mão celebrating with his teammates after winning the 2015 World Cup qualifiers.

=== Individual ===
- FIFA Beach Soccer World Cup (1):
  - Golden Glove: 2009
- Beach Soccer Stars (4):
  - World's top 3 best goalkeepers: 2017, 2018, 2019
  - World dream team: 2017
- Intercontinental Cup (4):
  - Best player: 2014
  - Best goalkeeper: 2011, 2014, 2017
- CONMEBOL qualifiers for the FIFA Beach Soccer World Cup (3):
  - Best goalkeeper: 2009, 2011, 2017
- Copa América (1):
  - Best goalkeeper: 2016
- Mundialito (3):
  - Best goalkeeper: 2008, 2009, 2017
- Copa Latina (2):
  - Best goalkeeper: 2009, 2011
- Mundialito de Clubes (2):
  - Best player: 2013
  - Best goalkeeper: 2013
