= Bruno Xavier (beach soccer) =

Brazilian beach soccer player (born 1984)

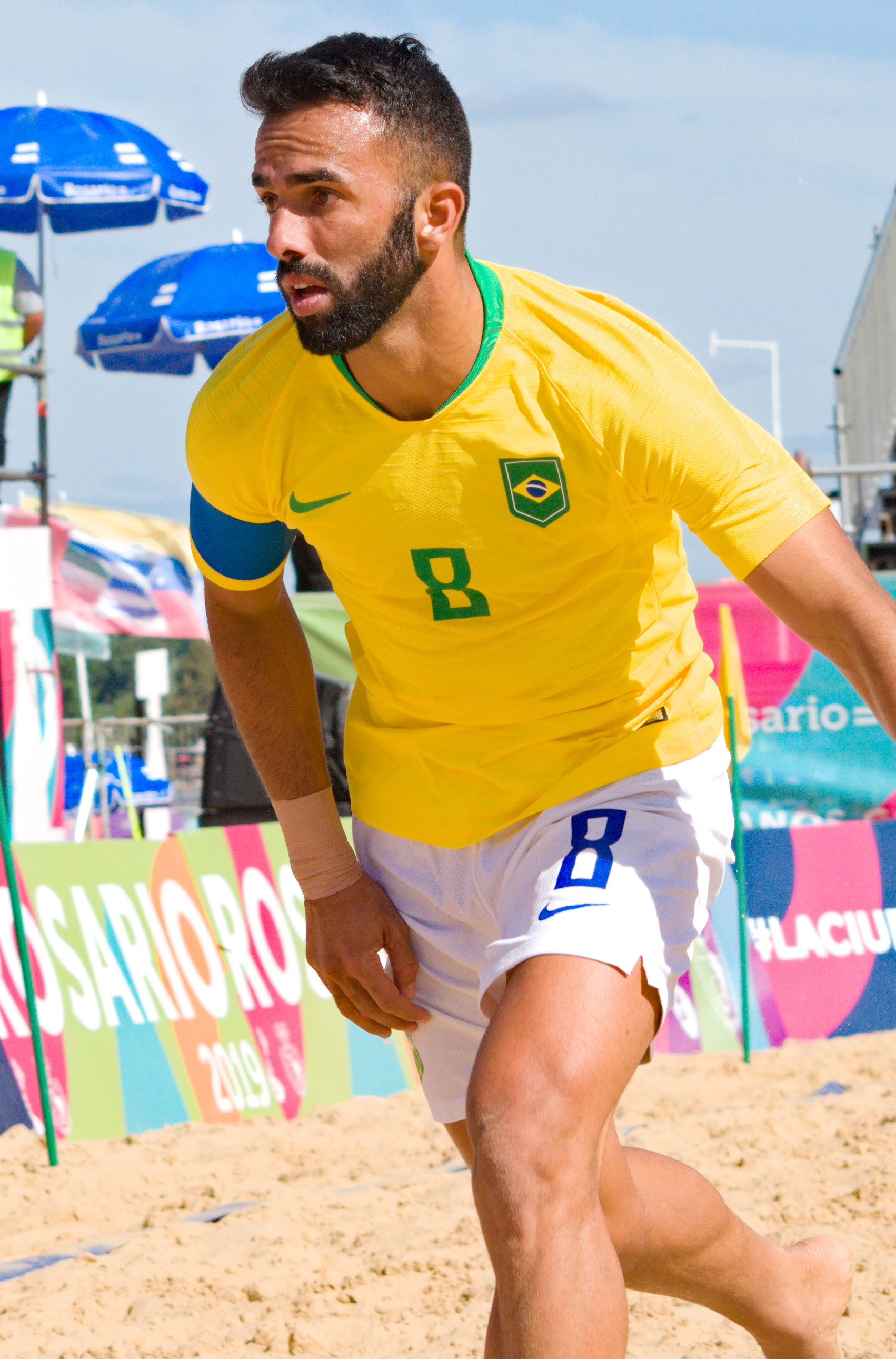
- Bruno Xavier at the 2019 South American Beach Games.

Personal information
- Full name: Bruno da Silva Xavier
- Date of birth: 15 August 1984 (age 42)
- Place of birth: Vitória, Brazil
- Height: 1.79 m (5 ft 10 in)
- Position: Defender

International career^{‡}
| Years | Team | Apps | (Gls) |
| 2008– | Brazil | 146 | (205) |
- ‡ National team caps and goals as of 15 January 2024

Bruno da Silva Xavier (born 15 August 1984) is a Brazilian beach soccer player who plays as a forward.

A former captain of the Brazil national beach soccer team, Xavier led the side to victory at the 2017 FIFA Beach Soccer World Cup in the Bahamas. During the 2010s, he was widely regarded as one of the world's top beach soccer players, winning the Best Player award at the inaugural Beach Soccer Stars ceremony in 2014 and earning consistent nominations and selections to the Team of the Year. He is known for his goal-scoring ability, acrobatic skills, and longevity.

Xavier ranks among Brazil's all-time leading scorers. He contributed as a key veteran to Brazil's sixth FIFA Beach Soccer World Cup title in 2024 (appearing in all six matches and scoring two goals) but was not selected for the team's seventh title-winning squad in 2025. He continues to compete at club level into his 40s, including recent participation in events such as the World Winners Cup.

== Career ==
Before he began his beach soccer career, Xavier originally played association football as a goalkeeper. Xavier asked to train with the Brazil national beach soccer team and when fellow international goalkeeper Mão saw his talent, he invited Xavier to train with him.

Xavier was subsequently called up to the beach soccer national team, but the competition for the spot of first team goalkeeper was intense. Xavier was considered the team's third goalkeeper and did not get an opportunity to play. Brazil's then manager, Duda, believed he was good with the ball at his feet and had potential to be a good outfield player, but he would have to train as such for a year before he could play in the national team.

In 2008, aged 24, Xavier finally made his debut for Brazil, now transformed into an outfield player. After impressing in the 2010 and 2011 Italian Serie A seasons, winning the best player of the year in both, he was subsequently included in Brazil's provisional squad for the 2011 World Cup. However, then coach Alexandre Soares did not pick him for the final 12-man group, an extreme disappointment for Xavier. His dream of playing at the World Cup was ultimately fulfilled by Brazil's successor coach, Júnior Negão, who included Xavier (now aged 29) in his final squad for the 2013 World Cup also giving him the number 8 shirt, previously worn by Negão himself. The tournament proved to be highly successful for Xavier as an individual as he claimed the Golden Boot (Highest scorer) and Silver Ball (2nd best player) awards, cementing his importance to the Brazilian national team.

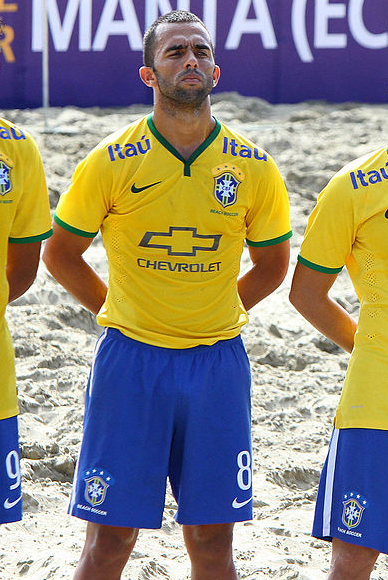
Xavier at the 2015 World Cup qualifiers.

In May 2014, Xavier scored a goal against Germany in a BSWW Tour event in Mexico, considered to be one of the greatest beach soccer goals ever, with calls for a FIFA Puskas Award nomination.

At the inaugural Beach Soccer Stars awards in November 2014, Xavier was crowned the world's best player as voted for by fellow players and managers confirming his status as world beach soccer icon and not just to Brazil. He has subsequently been in the top three nominees for the best player award in 2015, 2017 and 2018; he was voted as part of the team of the year every year since the awards began until 2018, the only player to be so.

Under a new coach (Gilberto Costa) and as captain, Xavier went on to lead Brazil to their first World Cup title in eight years in 2017. In the September, Xavier earned his 100th cap for Brazil; these achievements were part of a 66 match winning streak under his leadership which ended with a loss to Russia in November 2018 in which Xavier was controversially sent off in.

Xavier scored his 200th goal for Brazil in a 10–1 win over Uruguay at the South American World Cup qualifiers in May 2019.

In a huge surprise, Xavier was left out of Brazil's squad for the 2021 World Cup in Moscow. In an Instagram video, Xavier shied away from stating exactly why he had been left out of the team, but nevertheless did mention being unable to attend the World Cup qualifiers due to playing in Europe at the time, and the effects of the COVID-19 pandemic on travel, and the introduction of younger players to the squad.

As is typical for top beach soccer players, Xavier has played for many club sides in numerous countries. They include Vasco da Gama, Corinthians, Espírito Santo FC and Sampaio Corrêa domestically as well as Catanzaro (Italy), Terracina (Italy), Strogino (Russia), Kristall (Russia), Alanyaspor (Turkey), Barcelona (Spain), Sporting CP (Portugal), Braga (Portugal), Kfar Qassem (Israel) in European leagues and international competitions. After his exclusion from the Brazil national team in 2021, he continued his trade for clubs both nationally and internationally, including winning the best player award of the 2022 Italian Serie A season representing Pisa. But this period of exclusion peaked for Xavier at the 2023 Euro Winners Cup, where he won the best player award of Europe's paramount club competition. Soon after in November, he was called back up to the Seleção for the first time in nearly four years, aged 39, for the 2023 South American Beach Soccer League.

Xavier remained a key veteran presence for Brazil, contributing in major tournaments including the FIFA Beach Soccer World Cup UAE 2024 in Dubai, where he played all six matches (scoring 2 goals) as Brazil won their sixth World Cup.

He has continued club commitments into his 40s, including with Falfala Kfar Qassem (2023/2024) and Pafos FC (2024/2025), while featuring in events like the Euro Winners Cup and maintaining his ambassadorial role in the sport.

As of 2026, now aged 41, Xavier is still active and regarded as a legendary figure in beach soccer, with over 200 caps and goals for Brazil, and occasional call-ups or involvement with the national setup under coaches like Chicão Castelo Branco.

In a notable development, Xavier was not included in Brazil's squad for the 2025 FIFA Beach Soccer World Cup in Seychelles, marking his first absence from the tournament since 2011; the decision came amid a squad refresh despite his contributions to the 2024 triumph.

He continues to compete at club level, associated with sides such as Rosh Haayin BSC in Euro Winners Cup competitions and maintaining his status as a forward/pivot in profiles for ongoing seasons.

== Personal life ==
Xavier is married to Mariângela Antunes, who also plays beach soccer, having been introduced to the sport through her husband; the couple wed in March 2009 and have two children, Luna and Cauã.

In his home state of Espírito Santo, in Anchieta, Xavier set up the "Mission Training Center" which he established in order to "integrate young people into society through sport" as well as develop the next generation of Brazilian beach soccer players. The centre also has a focus on developing women's beach soccer. The centre has proved successful in nurturing players such as Gean Pietro and Raphael Silva, who have gone on to represent the Brazilian national under-20 beach soccer team in winning the 2017 South American Under-20 Beach Soccer Championship.

Júnior Negão and Juninho are his idols. His nephew, Breno Xavier, is also a successful beach soccer player, having been champion of the Brazilian Championship; he pursued the sport because of his uncle.

== Statistics ==
Note: Some of the sources of these statistics may have counted an appearance when the player was actually an unused substitute.

Country

| Tournament | Year | Apps | Goals |
|---|---|---|---|
| FIFA Beach Soccer World Cup | (French Polynesia) 2013 | 6 | 10 |
| FIFA Beach Soccer World Cup | (Portugal) 2015 | 4 | 3 |
| FIFA Beach Soccer World Cup | (The Bahamas) 2017 | 6 | 1 |
| FIFA Beach Soccer World Cup | (Paraguay) 2019 | 4 | 2 |
| Total | | 20 | 16 |

| Tournament | Year | Apps | Goals |
|---|---|---|---|
Beach Soccer Intercontinental Cup
| Beach Soccer Intercontinental Cup | 2011 | 5 | 4 |
| Beach Soccer Intercontinental Cup | 2012 | 1 | 0 |
| Beach Soccer Intercontinental Cup | 2013 | 5 | 11 |
| Beach Soccer Intercontinental Cup | 2014 | 3 | 6 |
| Beach Soccer Intercontinental Cup | 2015 | — | — |
| Beach Soccer Intercontinental Cup | 2016 | 5 | 8 |
| Beach Soccer Intercontinental Cup | 2017 | 5 | 7 |
| Beach Soccer Intercontinental Cup | 2018 | 4 | 6 |
| Total | | 28 | 42 |

Club

| Tournament | Year | Club | Apps | Goals |
|---|---|---|---|---|
Euro Winners Cup
| Euro Winners Cup | (Italy) 2014 | (Russia) Kristall | 7 | 11 |
| Euro Winners Cup | (Italy) 2015 | (Russia) Kristall | 7 | 7 |
| Euro Winners Cup | (Italy) 2016 | (Russia) Kristall | 4 | 7 |
| Euro Winners Cup | (Portugal) 2017 | (Portugal) Braga | 7 | 8 |
| Euro Winners Cup | (Portugal) 2018 | (Israel) Falfala Kfar Qassem | 7 | 3 |
| Euro Winners Cup | (Portugal) 2019 | (Portugal) Braga | 7 | 2 |
| Euro Winners Cup | (Portugal) 2021 | (Israel) Falfala Kfar Qassem | 2 | 0 |
| Euro Winners Cup | (Portugal) 2022 | (Italy) Pisa | 7 | 2 |
| Euro Winners Cup | (Portugal) 2023 | (Italy) Pisa | 8 | 3 |
| Total | | | 56 | 43 |

== Honours ==
The following is a selection, not an exhaustive list, of the major international honours Xavier has won:

=== Country ===
- FIFA Beach Soccer World Cup (2): 2017, 2024
- Beach Soccer Intercontinental Cup (3): 2014, 2016, 2017
- CONMEBOL qualifiers for the FIFA Beach Soccer World Cup (3): 2015, 2017, 2019
- CONMBEOL Copa América de Beach Soccer (1): 2016
- South American Beach Soccer League (2): 2017, 2018
  - North zone regular season event (2): 2017, 2018
- Mundialito (2): 2016, 2017
- South American Beach Games (3): 2011, 2014, 2019

=== Club ===
- Mundialito de Clubes (6): 2011, 2013, 2015, 2019, 2020, 2021
- Euro Winners Cup (4): 2014, 2015, 2017, 2019

=== Individual ===
- FIFA Beach Soccer World Cup
  - Golden Ball: 2013
  - Silver Shoe: 2013
- Beach Soccer Stars
  - World's best player: 2014
  - World dream team: 2014, 2015, 2016, 2017, 2018, 2023
- Intercontinental Cup
  - Top scorer: 2014, 2016
  - Best player: 2016
- CONMEBOL qualifiers
  - Top scorer: 2013
- CONMEBOL Copa América
  - Best player: 2016
- South American Beach Games
  - Top scorer: 2011
- Euro Winners Cup
  - Best player: 2014, 2023
