= 2021 FIFA Beach Soccer World Cup qualification (CONMEBOL) =

South American men's beach soccer trials

Tournament details
- Host country: Brazil
- City: Rio de Janeiro
- Dates: 26 June – 4 July 2021
- Teams: 10 (from 1 confederation)
- Venue(s): 1 (in 1 host city)

Final positions
- Champions: Brazil (8th title)
- Runners-up: Uruguay
- Third place: Paraguay
- Fourth place: Colombia

Tournament statistics
- Matches played: 27
- Goals scored: 174 (6.44 per match)
- Top scorer(s): (Brazil) Edson Hulk (Paraguay) Carlos Carballo (8 goals each)
- Best goalkeeper: (Venezuela) Alberto Prado
- Fair play award: Brazil

The 2021 FIFA Beach Soccer World Cup qualifiers for CONMEBOL was the ninth edition of the FIFA Beach Soccer World Cup qualification championship for South American men's national teams, and the third edition organized by CONMEBOL. Originally scheduled to be played in May 2021, it was eventually rescheduled to be held from 26 June to 4 July 2021 in Rio de Janeiro, Brazil.

The tournament served to determine the three nations from CONMEBOL that qualified for the 2021 FIFA Beach Soccer World Cup in Russia.

Hosts Brazil were the defending champions.

== Teams ==
All ten CONMEBOL member national teams entered the tournament.

Team	Appearance	Previous best performance
Argentina	9th	Champions (2013)
Bolivia	4th	Ninth place (2015, 2019)
Brazil (hosts and holders)	9th	Champions (2006, 2008, 2009, 2011, 2015, 2017, 2019)
Chile	8th	Fifth place (2008, 2009, 2013, 2017)
Colombia	6th	Fourth place (2011)
Ecuador	7th	Third place (2017)
Paraguay	9th	Runners-up (2013, 2015, 2017)
Peru	9th	Fifth place (2019)
Uruguay	9th	Runners-up (2006, 2009, 2019)
Venezuela	9th	Third place (2011)

== Draw ==
The draw of the tournament was held on 4 June 2021, 18:00 PYT (UTC−4), at the CONMEBOL headquarters in Luque, Paraguay. The hosts and holders, Brazil, and the previous tournament's runners-up, Uruguay were seeded and assigned to the head of the groups A and B respectively. The remaining eight teams were split into four "pairing pots" (Paraguay–Argentina, Peru–Colombia, Chile–Ecuador, Bolivia–Venezuela) based on the final placement they reached in the previous edition of the tournament (shown in brackets).

Pot 1	Pot 2	Pot 3	Pot 4
Paraguay (3); Argentina (4)	Peru (5); Colombia (6)	Chile (7); Ecuador (8)	Bolivia (9); Venezuela (10)

From each pot, the first team drawn was placed into Group A and then its position within the group was drawn; the second team drawn was placed into Group B and its position within the group was also defined by draw.

The draw resulted in the following groups:

Group A
Pos	Team
A1	Brazil
A2	Paraguay
A3	Ecuador
A4	Peru
A5	Venezuela

Group B
Pos	Team
B1	Uruguay
B2	Colombia
B3	Chile
B4	Argentina
B5	Bolivia

== Match officials ==
On 8 June 2021, CONMEBOL announced a total of 18 referees appointed for the tournament.

- (Argentina) Mariano Romo
- (Argentina) Pablo Defelippi
- (Bolivia) Jaimito Suárez
- (Bolivia) José Luis Mendoza
- (Brazil) Lucas Estevão
- (Brazil) Luciano Andrade
- (Chile) Jorge Darío Cortés
- (Colombia) Jorge Iván Gómez
- (Colombia) Erney Gonzalo Ramos
- (Ecuador) Brando Luis Amay
- (Paraguay) Silvio Coronel
- (Paraguay) Gustavo Domínguez
- (Peru) Alex Valdivieso
- (Peru) Micke Palomino
- (Uruguay) Christian Altez
- (Uruguay) Aecio Fernández
- (Venezuela) Jesús Leandro Reyes
- (Venezuela) Luis Coy

== Group stage ==
Each team earns three points for a win in regulation time, two points for a win in extra time, one point for a win in a penalty shoot-out, and no points for a defeat. The top two teams from each group advance to the semi-finals, while the teams in third, fourth and fifth advance to the fifth place, seventh place, and ninth place matches respectively.

All times are local, BRT (UTC−3); match reports are in Spanish.

29 June was allocated as a rest day.

=== Group A ===
Pos	Team	Pld	W	W+	WP	L	GF	GA	GD	Pts	Qualification
1	Brazil (H)	4	4	0	0	0	29	11	+18	12	Knockout stage
2	Paraguay	4	3	0	0	1	18	13	+5	9	Knockout stage
3	Venezuela	4	1	1	0	2	15	20	−5	5	Fifth place match
4	Peru	4	1	0	0	3	11	14	−3	3	Seventh place match
5	Ecuador	4	0	0	0	4	8	23	−15	0	Ninth place match

Source: CONMEBOL
Rules for classification: 1) Points; 2) Head-to-head points; 3) Head-to-head goal difference; 4) Head-to-head goals scored; 5) Goal difference; 6) Goals scored; 7) Red cards; 8) Yellow cards; 9) Drawing of lots.
(H) Host
26 June 2021
13:30

Paraguay	6–4	Venezuela
G. Benítez 3'; C. Benítez 7', 8', 33'; Carballo 9', 32'	Report	García 15', 24'; Rosdel 22'; Medina 23'

Barra Olympic Park, Rio de Janeiro
Referee: Christian Altez (Uruguay)
26 June 2021
15:00

Brazil	6–3	Peru
Edson Hulk 1', 13'; Brendo 7'; Catarino 11'; Alisson 29'; Zé Lucas 36'	Report	Delgado 7'; Drago 22'; Alcántara 33'

Barra Olympic Park, Rio de Janeiro
Referee: Mariano Romo (Argentina)

27 June 2021
13:30

Peru	3–4 (a.e.t.)	Venezuela
Alcántara 12', 26'; Velezmoro 35'	Report	Rosdel 16'; E.Ramos 22'; Garcia 33'; Narea 39'

Barra Olympic Park, Rio de Janeiro
Referee: Jaimito Suárez (Bolivia)
27 June 2021
15:00

Brazil	7–3	Ecuador
Edson Hulk 9', 13', 15', 27'; Catarino 22', 28'; Zé Lucas 21'	Report	Edson Hulk 1' (o.g.); Catarino 19' (o.g.); Nevares 27'

Barra Olympic Park, Rio de Janeiro
Referee: Aecio Fernández (Uruguay)

28 June 2021
13:30

Peru	0–3	Paraguay
	Report	Carballo 3', 36'; M. Medina 19'

Barra Olympic Park, Rio de Janeiro
Referee: Pablo Defelippi (Argentina)
28 June 2021
15:00

Venezuela	5–3	Ecuador
Escobar 1'; Bacelar 11'; Rosdel 12'; Garcia 21', 32'	Report	Cedeño 3'; Macias 28'; Bailon 30'

Barra Olympic Park, Rio de Janeiro
Referee: Christian Altez (Uruguay)

30 June 2021
13:30

Paraguay	6–1	Ecuador
Medina 6'; Cantero 9', 14'; Carballo 11'; Ojeda 13'; J. Benítez 35'	Report	Cedeño 18'

Barra Olympic Park, Rio de Janeiro
Referee: Erney Ramos (Colombia)
30 June 2021
15:00

Brazil	8–2	Venezuela
Catarino 5'; Antônio 5'; Brendo 21', 35'; Mão 23'; Luis Henrique 24'; Edson Hulk 25'; Zé Lucas 33'	Report	Vaamonde 10'; Ramos 15'

Barra Olympic Park, Rio de Janeiro
Referee: Mariano Romo (Argentina)

1 July 2021
13:30

Ecuador	1–5	Peru
Nevarez Vera 25'	Report	Zagaceta 6'; Velezmoro 13', 21'; Ibañez 19'; Zamora 29'

Barra Olympic Park, Rio de Janeiro
Referee: Iván Gómez (Colombia)
1 July 2021
15:00

Brazil	8–3	Paraguay
Alisson 1'; Catarino 4', 29', 32', 33'; Zé Lucas 25'; Antônio 29', 35'	Report	Carballo 14', 29'; Medina 35'

Barra Olympic Park, Rio de Janeiro
Referee: Pablo Defelippi (Argentina)

=== Group B ===
Pos	Team	Pld	W	W+	WP	L	GF	GA	GD	Pts	Qualification
1	Uruguay	4	3	1	0	0	12	6	+6	11	Knockout stage
2	Colombia	4	3	0	0	1	14	11	+3	9	Knockout stage
3	Argentina	4	1	0	1	2	11	10	+1	4	Fifth place match
4	Chile	4	1	0	0	3	10	8	+2	3	Seventh place match
5	Bolivia	4	0	0	0	4	4	16	−12	0	Ninth place match

Source: CONMEBOL
Rules for classification: 1) Points; 5) Head-to-head points; 3) Head-to-head goal difference; 4) Head-to-head goals scored; 5) Goal difference; 6) Goals scored; 7) Red cards; 8) Yellow cards; 9) Drawing of lots.
26 June 2021
10:30

Bolivia	1–2	Colombia
Aguilera 20'	Report	Perea 29'; Acosta 34'

Barra Olympic Park, Rio de Janeiro
Referee: Silvio Coronel (Paraguay)
26 June 2021
12:00

Argentina	0–2	Uruguay
	Report	Cabrera 14'; Catardo 16'

Barra Olympic Park, Rio de Janeiro
Referee: Lucas Estevão (Brazil)

27 June 2021
10:30

Argentina	5–0	Bolivia
Sirico 5'; De Sosa 16'; Medero 21'; Benaducci 22'; Ponzetti 32'	Report

Barra Olympic Park, Rio de Janeiro
Referee: Alex Valdivieso (Peru)
27 June 2021
12:00

Uruguay	3–2	Chile
N. Bella 3'; Laduche 13'; A. Quinta 22'	Report	Tobar 15'; Yañez 30'

Barra Olympic Park, Rio de Janeiro
Referee: Micke Palomino (Peru)

28 June 2021
10:30

Colombia	7–5	Argentina
Córdoba 17'; Ortega 20'; Acosta 29'; Pantoja 31', 32'; Perea 34'; Ossa 36'	Report	De Sosa 3', 11'; Holmedilla 14'; Ponzetti 17'; Medero 29'

Barra Olympic Park, Rio de Janeiro
Referee: Luciano Andrade (Brazil)
28 June 2021
12:00

Chile	5–0	Bolivia
Flores 4'; Aguilera 15', 19', 29'; Nuñez 18'	Report

Barra Olympic Park, Rio de Janeiro
Referee: Silvio Coronel (Paraguay)

30 June 2021
10:30

Colombia	4–2	Chile
Perea 12', 26'; Ossa 21'; Ortega 26'	Report	Aguilera 10', 32'

Barra Olympic Park, Rio de Janeiro
Referee: Jesús Reyes (Venezuela)
30 June 2021
12:00

Uruguay	4–3 (a.e.t.)	Bolivia
Laduche 3', 8', 24'; Capurro 39'	Report	Aguilera 26', 35'; Chávez 32'

Barra Olympic Park, Rio de Janeiro
Referee: Luis Coy (Venezuela)

1 July 2021
10:30

Chile	1–1 (a.e.t.)	Argentina
Aguilera 2'	Report	Ponzetti 5'
Penalties
Silva (penalty scored); Aguilera (penalty scored); Peso (penalty missed)	2–3	Medero (penalty scored); Benaducci (penalty scored); Ponzetti (penalty scored)

Barra Olympic Park, Rio de Janeiro
Referee: Brandon Amay (Ecuador)
1 July 2021
12:00

Uruguay	3–1	Colombia
L. Quinta 10', 23'; Miranda 28'	Report	Ortega 19'

Barra Olympic Park, Rio de Janeiro
Referee: Micke Palomino (Peru)

== Placement matches ==
Ninth place match
3 July
Ecuador	1
Bolivia	6

Seventh place match
3 July
Peru	2
Chile	5

Fifth place match
4 July
Venezuela	4
Argentina	3

=== Ninth place match ===
3 July 2021
10:30

Ecuador	1–6	Bolivia
	Report

Barra Olympic Park, Rio de Janeiro
Referee: Silvio Coronel (Paraguay)

=== Seventh place match ===
3 July 2021
12:00

Peru	2–5	Chile
	Report

Barra Olympic Park, Rio de Janeiro
Referee: Jaimito Suárez (Bolivia)

=== Fifth place match ===
4 July 2021
12:00

Venezuela	4–3	Argentina
	Report

Barra Olympic Park, Rio de Janeiro
Referee: Brandon Amay (Ecuador)

== Knockout stage ==
2 July was allocated as a rest day.

=== Bracket ===
Semi-finals
3 July
Brazil	3
Colombia	1
3 July
Uruguay	4
Paraguay	3

Final
4 July
Brazil	3
Uruguay	1
Third place match
4 July
Colombia	2
Paraguay	4

=== Semi-finals ===
Winners qualify for 2021 FIFA Beach Soccer World Cup.

3 July 2021
13:30

Uruguay	4–3	Paraguay
L. Quinta 17'; Bella 30'; Laduche 33', 35'	Report	G.Benitez 31'; Carballo 32'; Ojeda 32'

Barra Olympic Park, Rio de Janeiro
Referee: Mariano Romo (Argentina)

3 July 2021
15:00

Brazil	3–1	Colombia
Zé Lucas 14'; Córdoba 14' (o.g.); Alisson 30'	Report	Perea 2'

Barra Olympic Park, Rio de Janeiro
Referee: Micke Palomino (Peru)

=== Third place match ===
Winner qualifies for 2021 FIFA Beach Soccer World Cup.

4 July 2021
13:30

Colombia	2–4	Paraguay
Londoño 19'; Acosta 31'	Report	G. Benitez 4', 14'; Medina 13'; Carballo 22'

Barra Olympic Park, Rio de Janeiro
Referee: Lucas Estevão (Brazil)

=== Final ===
4 July 2021
15:00

Brazil	3–1	Uruguay
Edson Hulk 9', 35'; Zé Lucas 11'	Report	L. Quinta 34'

Barra Olympic Park, Rio de Janeiro
Referee: Gustavo Domínguez (Paraguay)

== Final ranking ==
Qualified for the 2021 FIFA Beach Soccer World Cup

Rank	Team
1st place, gold medalist(s)	Brazil
2nd place, silver medalist(s)	Uruguay
3rd place, bronze medalist(s)	Paraguay
4	Colombia
5	Venezuela
6	Argentina
7	Chile
8	Peru
9	Bolivia
10	Ecuador

== Qualified teams for FIFA Beach Soccer World Cup ==
The following three teams from CONMEBOL qualify for the 2021 FIFA Beach Soccer World Cup.

Team	Qualified on	Previous appearances in FIFA Beach Soccer World Cup^{1} only FIFA era (since 2005)
Uruguay	3 July 2021	6 (2005, 2006, 2007, 2008, 2009, 2019)
Brazil	3 July 2021	10 (2005, **2006**, **2007**, **2008**, **2009**, 2011, 2013, 2015, **2017**, 2019)
Paraguay	4 July 2021	4 (2013, 2015, 2017, 2019)

^{1} Bold indicates champions for that year. Italic indicates hosts for that year.
