= Beach soccer at the South American Beach Games =

Beach soccer has been a South American Beach Games event since the first edition of these games in 2009 in Montevideo, Uruguay.

== Men ==
=== Summary ===
Year	Host	Final			Third place match		
Year	Host	Champions	Score	Runners-up	Third place	Score	Fourth place
2009; Details	(Uruguay); Montevideo	Brazil	7–4	Argentina	Uruguay	9–3	Colombia
2011; Details	(Ecuador); Manta	Brazil	7–0	Paraguay	Ecuador	7–6	Argentina
2014; Details	(Venezuela); Vargas	Brazil	9–3	Paraguay	Argentina	7–7 (a.e.t.); 1–0 (p)	Ecuador
2019; Details	(Argentina); Rosario	Brazil	8–1	Argentina	Colombia	6–5	Paraguay
2023; Details	(Colombia); Santa Marta	Brazil	6–2	Colombia	Argentina	6–5 (a.e.t.)	Paraguay

=== Medal table ===
Rank	Nation	Gold	Silver	Bronze	Total
1	Brazil	5	0	0	5
2	Argentina	0	2	2	4
3	Paraguay	0	2	0	2
4	Colombia	0	1	1	2
5	Ecuador	0	0	1	1
5	Uruguay	0	0	1	1
Totals (6 entries)		5	5	5	15
