= Bolivia national beach soccer team =

National sports team

Bolivia
- Nickname(s): La Verde (The Green); Los Altiplanicos (The Highlanders)
- Association: Bolivian Football Federation (FBF)
- Confederation: CONMEBOL (South America)
- Head coach: Gustavo Benítez
- FIFA code: BOL
- BSWW ranking: 56 ▲2 (2 September 2026)
First colours
Second colours

First international
- El Salvador 7–3 Bolivia (Huanchaco, Peru; 7 December 2014)

Biggest win
- Bolivia 6–3 Dominican Republic (Huanchaco, Peru; 12 December 2014); Bolivia 5–2 Uruguay (Santa Cruz de Asia, Peru; 4 March 2018)

Biggest defeat
- Brazil 11–1 Bolivia (Rio de Janeiro, Brazil; 28 April 2019)

World Cup
- Appearances: 0
- Best result: none

The Bolivia national beach soccer team represents Bolivia in international beach soccer competitions and is controlled by the Federación Boliviana de Fútbol (Bolivian Football Federation), the governing body for football in Bolivia.

Bolivia first fielded a beach soccer team at the 2014 Bolivarian Beach Games in Huanchaco, Peru. Subsequently, in 2015, La Verde became the final of the 10 members of CONMEBOL to start competing in the Beach Soccer World Cup qualifiers, meaning all 10 were contesting the event together for the first time. Since then, Bolivia have remained an active team, becoming regulars at the major CONMEBOL events of the World Cup qualifiers, Copa América and Liga Sudamericana, however have yet to achieve a podium finish.

== Current squad ==
As of February 2017

Note: Flags indicate national team as defined under FIFA eligibility rules; some limited exceptions apply. Players may hold more than one non-FIFA nationality.

No.	Pos.	Nation	Player
1	GK	BOL	Remberto Portales
2	FW	BOL	Carlos Guardia
3	DF	BOL	Marcelo Guzmán
4	DF	BOL	Jorge Suárez
5	FW	BOL	Oliver Algarañaz
6	MF	BOL	Yhonny Morón

No.	Pos.	Nation	Player
7	FW	BOL	Pablo Zapata
8	FW	BOL	Julio Zambrano
9	FW	BOL	Iver Castedo
10	FW	BOL	Pedro López
11	FW	BOL	Berthy Alpire
12	GK	BOL	Carlos Carreño

Coach: Antonio Gigliotti

== Achievements ==
- CONMEBOL qualifiers for the FIFA Beach Soccer World Cup best: 9th place
  - 2015, 2019, 2021
- Copa América de Beach Soccer best: 6th place
  - 2018
- Bolivarian Beach Games best: 7th place
  - 2014

== Competitive record ==
=== FIFA Beach Soccer World Cup ===
Year	Result	Pld	W	W+	WP	L	GF	GA	GD
1995 to 2013	did not enter								
2015 to 2017	did not qualify								
2019	did not qualify								
Total	0/19	0	0	0	0	0	0	0	0

=== CONMEBOL qualifiers for the FIFA Beach Soccer World Cup ===
Year	Result	Pld	W	W+	WP	L	GF	GA	GD
(Brazil) 2005^{†}	did not enter								
(Brazil) 2006	did not enter								
(Mexico) 2007^{†}	did not enter								
(Argentina) 2008	did not enter								
(Uruguay) 2009	did not enter								
(Brazil) 2011	did not enter								
(Argentina) 2013	did not enter								
(Ecuador) 2015	9th place of 10	5	1	0	0	4	15	21	–6
(Paraguay) 2017	10th place of 10	5	0	0	0	5	9	32	–23
(Brazil) 2019	9th place of 10	5	1	0	0	4	15	32	–17
(Brazil) 2021	9th place of 10	5	1	0	0	4	10	17	–7
Total	4/11	20	3	0	0	17	49	102	–53

† – Note: 2005 and 2007 were held in a joint championship with CONCACAF

=== Copa América de Beach Soccer ===
Year	Result	Pld	W	W+	WP	L	GF	GA	GD
(Brazil) 2016	7th place of 10	5	2	0	0	3	18	27	–9
(Peru) 2018	6th place of 10	5	1	1	0	3	26	29	–3
(Paraguay) 2022	10th place of 10	5	0	0	0	5	10	27	–17
(Argentina) 2023	8th place of 10	5	2	0	0	3	13	24	–11
(Chile) 2025	8th place of 10	5	0	1	0	4	15	20	–5
Total	5/5	25	5	2	0	18	82	127	–45

== See also ==
- Bolivia national futsal team
