= Beach soccer at the Bolivarian Beach Games =

Beach soccer has been an event at the Bolivarian Beach Games since the first edition of the games in 2012 in Lima, Peru. One event is held, the men's competition.

The event is contested between the members of ODEBO (Bolivia, Chile, Colombia, Ecuador, Panama, Peru and Venezuela) who choose to enter, plus other invited neighboring nations who are not ODEBO members.

Paraguay are the most successful team, having claimed two gold medals and are the only nation to have claimed any medal at all three games to date.

== Results ==
=== Summary ===
Year	Host	Final			Third place match		
Year	Host	Champions	Score	Runners-up	Third place	Score	Fourth place
2012; Details	(Peru) Lima	Paraguay	6–5 (a.e.t.)	Venezuela	Peru	5–3	El Salvador
2014; Details	(Peru) Huanchaco	Paraguay	6–5	El Salvador	Ecuador	5–5 (a.e.t.) (5–4 pen.)	Chile
2016; Details	(Chile) Iquique	El Salvador	5–3	Paraguay	Chile	6–4	Ecuador
2018; Details							

=== Medal table ===
Rank	Nation	Gold	Silver	Bronze	Total
1	Paraguay	2	1	0	3
2	El Salvador	1	1	0	2
3	Venezuela	0	1	0	1
4	Chile	0	0	1	1
4	Ecuador	0	0	1	1
4	Peru	0	0	1	1
Totals (6 entries)		3	3	3	9

=== Participating nations ===
Legend

- GS — Group stage (there were no placement matches in 2012)
- — Host nation

Nation	(Peru) 2012	(Peru) 2014	(Chile) 2016	Years
Bolivia	–	7th	–	1
Chile	–	4th	3rd	2
Colombia	GS	–	–	1
Dominican Republic	GS	8th	–	2
Ecuador	GS	3rd	4th	3
El Salvador	4th	2nd	1st	3
Guatemala	GS	–	–	1
Panama	–	–	7th	1
Paraguay	1st	1st	2nd	3
Peru	3rd	5th	6th	3
Venezuela	2nd	6th	5th	3
Number of teams	8	8	7	
