= FIFA Beach Soccer World Cup qualification (CONMEBOL) =

CONMEBOL qualifiers for the FIFA Beach Soccer World Cup
- Organizer(s): CONMEBOL
- Founded: 2006
- Abolished: 2022
- Region: South America
- Teams: 10
- Qualifier for: FIFA Beach Soccer World Cup
- Last champion: Brazil (8th title)
- Most championships: Brazil (8 titles)
- Website: conmebol.com
- 2021 CONMEBOL qualifiers

The CONMEBOL qualifiers for the FIFA Beach Soccer World Cup (natively in Spanish: Eliminatorias CONMEBOL al Mundial de la FIFA de Fútbol Playa), previously known as the South American Beach Soccer Championship (Spanish: Sudamericano de Fútbol Playa), was the main championship for beach soccer in South America, contested between the senior men's national teams of the members of CONMEBOL.

The tournament acted as the qualification route for South American nations to the FIFA Beach Soccer World Cup. The winners of the championship were also crowned continental champions. Coinciding with the annual staging of the World Cup, the competition took place yearly until 2009; the World Cup then became biennial, and as its supplementary qualification event, the championship followed suit.

The championship was established in 2006 after FIFA made it a requirement for all confederations to begin holding qualification tournaments to determine the best national team(s) in their region and hence those who would proceed to represent their continent in the upcoming World Cup (previously, nations were simply invited to play without having to earn their place). The first edition was preceded by a joint qualification tournament between CONMEBOL and CONCACAF in 2005; a second and final joint event was held in 2007. FIFA currently allocate South America three berths at the World Cup and hence the top three teams (the winners, runners-up and third place play-off winner) qualify to the World Cup finals.

Beach Soccer Worldwide (BSWW) originally organized the competition under the title FIFA Beach Soccer World Cup CONMEBOL qualifier. In 2013, CONMEBOL began reporting on the event using the aforementioned Sudamericano title (which the tournament became informally known as) before taking organizational control under a new title in 2017.

In July 2022, CONMEBOL decided to interrupt the tournament since CONMEBOL's representatives in the FIFA Beach Soccer World Cup would be determined via the Copa América de Beach Soccer, a tournament established by CONMEBOL in 2016 but which did not grant places for the World Cup.

Brazil were the last champions and the most successful nation with eight titles. They also won the 2005 joint event.

== Results ==
- Joint championship with CONCACAF

For every edition, the top three nations qualified to the FIFA Beach Soccer World Cup.

Year	Location	Final			Third place play-off		
Year	Location	Champions	Score	Runners-up	Third place	Score	Fourth place
2005	Qualifying tournament held jointly with CONCACAF; see 2005 Americas Beach Soccer Championship						
2006 details	Macaé, Brazil	Brazil	9–2	Uruguay	Argentina	2–0	Venezuela
2007	Qualifying tournament held jointly with CONCACAF; see 2007 CONCACAF and CONMEBOL Beach Soccer Championship						
2008 details	Buenos Aires, Argentina	Brazil	6–1	Argentina	Uruguay	5–1	Venezuela
2009 details	Montevideo, Uruguay	Brazil	10–1	Uruguay	Argentina	9–8	Ecuador
2011 details	Rio de Janeiro, Brazil	Brazil	6–2	Argentina	Venezuela	5–2	Colombia
2013 details	Merlo, Argentina	Argentina	6–2	Paraguay	Brazil	11–5	Ecuador
2015 details	Manta, Ecuador	Brazil	8–3	Paraguay	Argentina	4–4 (a.e.t.) (1–0 p.)	Ecuador
2017 details	Asunción, Paraguay	Brazil	7–5	Paraguay	Ecuador	4–4 (a.e.t.) (1–0 p.)	Argentina
2019 details	Rio de Janeiro, Brazil	Brazil	10–1	Uruguay	Paraguay	6–5	Argentina
2021 details	Rio de Janeiro, Brazil	Brazil	3–1	Uruguay	Paraguay	4–2	Colombia
Since 2023	See Copa América of Beach Soccer						

== Performance ==
=== Successful nations ===
Team	Titles	Runners-up	Third place	Fourth place	Total top 4
Brazil^{[a]}	8 (2006*, 2008, 2009, 2011*, 2015, 2017, 2019*, 2021*)	–	1 (2013)	–	9
Argentina^{[b]}	1 (2013*)	2 (2008*, 2011)	3 (2006, 2009, 2015)	2 (2017, 2019)	8
Uruguay^{[c]}	–	4 (2006, 2009*, 2019, 2021)	1 (2008)	–	5
Paraguay	–	3 (2013, 2015, 2017*)	2 (2019, 2021)	–	5
Ecuador	–	–	1 (2017)	3 (2009, 2013, 2015*)	4
Venezuela	–	–	1 (2011)	2 (2006, 2008)	3
Colombia	–	–	–	2 (2011, 2021)	2

* Hosts
a. Also winner of 2005 joint event.
b. Also 4th in 2005 and 3rd in 2007 joint events.
c. Also runners-up in 2005 and 2007 joint events.

=== Awards ===
Year	Top goalscorer(s)	Gls	Best player	Best goalkeeper	Ref.
(Brazil) 2006	(Brazil) Jorginho	14	(Brazil) Jorginho	(Uruguay) Diego Monserrat	
(Argentina) 2008	(Argentina) Ezequiel Hilaire	7	(Brazil) André	(Uruguay) Diego Monserrat	
(Uruguay) 2009	(Brazil) André	13	(Ecuador) Virley Conformé	(Brazil) Mão	
(Brazil) 2011	(Brazil) Bruno	12	(Brazil) Bruno	(Brazil) Mão	
(Argentina) 2013	(Brazil) Bruno Xavier	13	(Argentina) Luciano Franceschini	(Argentina) Marcelo Salgueiro	
(Ecuador) 2015	(Brazil) Datinha	12	(Ecuador) Segundo Moreira	(Paraguay) Ivan Fernandez	
(Paraguay) 2017	(Chile) Víctor Belaunde	11	(Paraguay) Carlos Carballo	(Brazil) Mão	
(Brazil) 2019	(Brazil) Rodrigo	14	not awarded	not awarded	
(Brazil) 2021	(Paraguay) Carlos Carballo (Brazil) Edson Hulk	9	not awarded	(Venezuela) Alberto Prado	

=== All-time table ===
As of 2021

Joint event results not included

Pos	Team	App	Pld	W	W+	WP	L	GF	GA	GD	Pts	PPG	Win %
1	Brazil	9	51	49	0	0	2	428	123	+305	147	2.88	96.1
2	Argentina	9	51	27	2	5	17	211	186	+25	90	1.76	66.7
3	Paraguay	9	44	22	3	1	18	210	186	+24	73	1.66	59.1
4	Uruguay	9	47	21	3	3	20	178	193	–15	72	1.53	57.4
5	Chile	8	37	16	0	1	20	172	165	+7	49	1.32	45.9
6	Colombia	6	34	11	1	1	21	128	155	–27	36	1.06	38.2
7	Ecuador	7	35	10	0	2	23	126	207	–81	32	0.91	34.3
8	Venezuela	9	46	8	2	1	35	153	252	–99	29	0.63	23.9
9	Peru	9	41	7	3	1	30	142	224	–82	28	0.68	26.8
10	Bolivia	4	20	3	0	0	17	49	102	–53	9	0.45	15.0

Key: Appearances App / Won in normal time W = 3 points / Won in extra-time W+ = 2 points / Won on penalty shoot-out WP = 1 point / Lost L = 0 points / Points per game PPG

=== Appearances & performance timeline ===
The following is a performance timeline of the teams who have appeared in the CONMEBOL qualifiers and how many appearances they each have made.

Legend

- 1st – Champions
- 2nd – Runners-up
- 3rd – Third place
- 4th – Fourth place
- 5th–10th – Fifth to tenth place
- × − Did not enter
- •• – Entered but withdrew
- – Hosts
- Apps – No. of appearances

Timeline

Year Team	2006 (Brazil) (6)	2008 (Argentina) (7)	2009 (Uruguay) (8)	2011 (Brazil) (9)	2013 (Argentina) (9)	2015 (Ecuador) (10)	2017 (Paraguay) (10)	2019 (Brazil) (10)	2021 (Brazil) (10)	Apps /9
Argentina	3rd	2nd	3rd	2nd	1st	3rd	4th	4th	6th	9
Bolivia	×	×	×	×	×	9th	10th	9th	9th	4
Brazil	1st	1st	1st	1st	3rd	1st	1st	1st	1st	9
Chile	×	5th	5th	7th	5th	7th	5th	7th	7th	8
Colombia	×	×	×	4th	7th	8th	6th	6th	4th	6
Ecuador	×	×	4th	8th	4th	4th	3rd	8th	10th	7
Paraguay	5th	6th	6th	6th	2nd	2nd	2nd	3rd	3rd	9
Peru	6th	7th	7th	9th	8th	6th	7th	5th	8th	9
Uruguay	2nd	3rd	2nd	5th	6th	5th	8th	2nd	2nd	9
Venezuela	4th	4th	8th	3rd	9th	10th	9th	10th	5th	9

=== Performance of qualifiers at the World Cup ===
The following is a performance timeline of the CONMEBOL teams who have gone on to appear in the World Cup, having qualified from the above events.

Legend

- 1st – Champions
- 2nd – Runners-up
- 3rd – Third place
- 4th – Fourth place
- – Hosts (qualify automatically)
- QF – Quarter-finals
- R1 – Round 1 (group stage)
- q – Qualified for upcoming tournament
- Total – Total times qualified for World Cup

Timeline

Year Team	(Brazil) 2005	(Brazil) 2006	(Brazil) 2007	(France) 2008	(United Arab Emirates) 2009	(Italy) 2011	(French Polynesia) 2013	(Portugal) 2015	(The Bahamas) 2017	(Paraguay) 2019	(Russia) 2021	(United Arab Emirates) 2024	(Seychelles) 2025	Total
Argentina	QF	QF	R1	QF	R1	R1	QF	R1				R1		9
Brazil	3rd	1st	1st	1st	1st	2nd	3rd	QF	1st	QF	QF	1st		12
Ecuador									R1					1
Paraguay							R1	R1	QF	R1	R1			5
Uruguay	QF	2nd	3rd	QF	4th					QF	QF			7
Venezuela						R1								1
Total number of unique qualifiers														6

== See also ==
- Copa América de Beach Soccer
- FIFA Futsal World Cup qualification (CONMEBOL)
