= Sarandi Sobral =

Uruguayan beach soccer player (born 1978)

Personal information
- Date of birth: 31 March 1978 (age 48)
- Place of birth: Montevideo, Uruguay
- Height: 1.79 m (5 ft 10 in)
- Position: Defender

Senior career*
Years	Team	Apps	(Gls)
2011	Botafogo beach soccer		
2011	Krylia Sovetov Samara beach soccer		
2012	Botafogo beach soccer		
2012	Flamengo beach soccer		

International career
2003–	Uruguay beach soccer		
- * Club domestic league appearances and goals

Sarandi Sobral (31 March 1978), nicknamed Pampero, is a Uruguayan beach soccer player. He also practices futsal and footvolley, two disciplines where he played for the national team.
