= 2014 South American Beach Games =

International multi-sport event

- Host city: Vargas, Venezuela
- Nations: 14
- Events: 10 sports
- Opening: 14 May 2014
- Closing: 24 May 2014
- Opened by: Nicolas Maduro; President of Venezuela

The 2014 South American Beach Games (Spanish:Juegos Suramericanos de Playa), officially the III South American Beach Games, is an international multi-sport event that is being held in Vargas, Venezuela, from May 14 – 24. It was slated to take place from 3 to 13 December 2013, but the Games was postponed at the time. This was due to athletes not able to get airline tickets to the event. Also, the infrastructure needed for the Games were not quite ready to receive the athletes. Therefore, ODESUR has allowed Vargas to continue preparing the venues for the Games.

== Participating teams ==
All 14 nations of the Organización Deportiva Suramericana (ODESUR) are expected to compete in these Beach Games.

- Argentina
- Aruba
- Bolivia
- Brazil
- Chile
- Colombia
- Ecuador
- Guyana
- Panama
- Paraguay
- Peru
- Suriname
- Uruguay
- Venezuela (Host)

== Sports ==
- Beach handball
- Beach football
- Beach rugby
- Beach tennis
- Beach volleyball
- Open water swimming
- Sailing
- Surfing
- Triathlon
- Water ski

== Medal table ==
Rank	Nation	Gold	Silver	Bronze	Total
1	Venezuela	10	13	8	31
2	Argentina	6	11	11	28
3	Brazil	6	9	4	19
4	Ecuador	5	3	4	12
5	Colombia	5	1	3	9
6	Peru	5	0	3	8
7	Uruguay	1	1	2	4
8	Chile	1	0	3	4
9	Paraguay	0	1	1	2
Totals (9 entries)		39	39	39	117
