= 2017 South American Beach Soccer League =

2017 CONMEBOL South American Beach Soccer League
Liga Sudamericana de Fútbol Playa
- Map showing the locations of the events of the 2017 season

Tournament details
- Host countries: Peru; Paraguay; Brazil
- Dates: Regular season: 12–23 September 2017; Finals: 5–6 October 2018
- Teams: 20 (from 1 confederation)
- Venue(s): 3 (in 3 host cities)

Final positions
- Champions: Brazil (1st title)
- Runners-up: Paraguay

Tournament statistics
- Matches played: 44
- Goals scored: 347 (7.89 per match)

The 2017 CONMEBOL South American Beach Soccer League was the first edition of the South American Beach Soccer League (named natively in Spanish as the CONMEBOL Liga Sudamericana de Fútbol Playa), a continental league competition for South American men's national beach soccer teams. Organised by the governing body for South American football, CONMEBOL, as part of its Development Department's Evolution Program, all ten members of the continental confederation took part, with both senior and Under 20s teams participating in the league events.

The teams were first divided into two geographically based zones (North and South) to compete in a round robin tournament against other members of their own zone. The winners of each zone then proceeded to face each other in the Finals to contest the title.

The regular season events took place in September 2017, whilst, due to delays, the finals did not take place until October 2018.

Brazil won the league after, as North zone champions, they defeated South zone champions Paraguay in the finals.

== Format ==
The league operates under the following format:

- The ten nations have been split into two zones, North and South, comprising five nations each.
- Each zone hosts one round of fixtures involving all five nations of said zone, split into two categories of matches; a set of matches contested between the senior representative teams and a set of matches contested between the Under 20s teams.
- Teams compete in round robin format exclusively against other teams in their own category.
- Points earned by the nations in both the senior and the Under 20s matches are combined into one single cumulative table.
- The nation top of the table with the most points after all matches are completed are deemed zone champions. The winning nations of each zone's event proceed to the Finals.
- In the Finals, the North zone champion will face the South zone champion in both senior team fixtures and Under 20s team fixtures.
- The victors of these matches will be crowned league champions.

== Calendar ==
Dates	Country	City	Event
12–16 September 2017	Peru	Lima	North zone
19–23 September 2017	Paraguay	Lambare	South zone
5–6 October 2018	Brazil	Rio de Janeiro	Finals (both zones)

== Teams ==
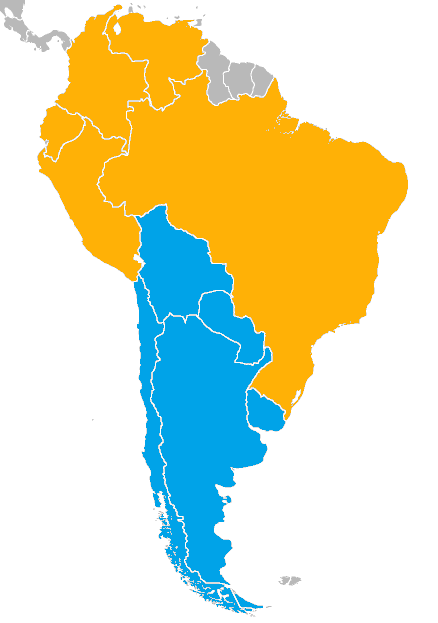
Nations in the North zone Nations in the South zone Not a member of CONMEBOL

Ten nations have sent two teams each, a senior representative squad and an Under 20s representative squad. In total, 20 teams will compete.

=== North zone ===
- Brazil
- Colombia
- Ecuador
- Peru
- Venezuela
- Brazil U20s
- Colombia U20s
- Ecuador U20s
- Peru U20s
- Venezuela U20s

=== South zone ===
- Argentina
- Bolivia
- Chile
- Paraguay
- Uruguay
- Argentina U20s
- Bolivia U20s
- Chile U20s
- Paraguay U20s
- Uruguay U20s

== North zone ==
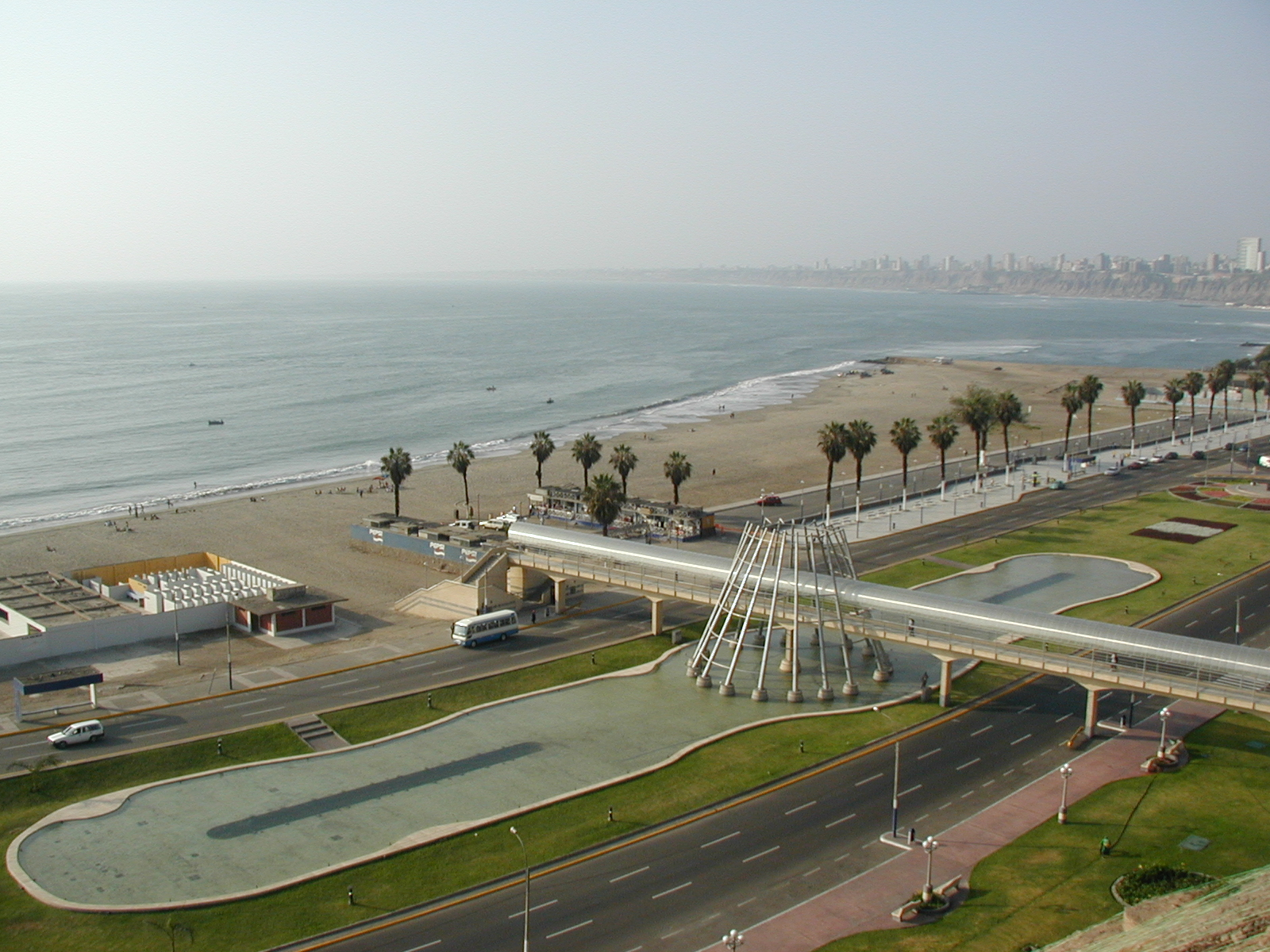
Agua Dulce Beach in Lima, the venue of the North zone event

The North zone regular season event took place in the Peruvian capital of Lima. All matches were hosted in a purpose built arena on Agua Dulce Beach in the district of Chorrillos, organised in cooperation with the Peruvian Football Federation.

Matches are listed as local time in Lima, PET (UTC-5).

=== Standings ===
Advance to the Finals

Pos	Team	Pld	W	W+	WP	L	GF	GA	GD	Pts
1	Team Brazil	8	8	0	0	0	51	20	+31	24
2	Team Ecuador	8	4	1	0	3	32	29	+3	14
3	Team Venezuela	8	3	0	0	5	29	37	–8	9
4	Team Peru	8	1	1	2	4	28	38	–10	7
5	Team Colombia	8	0	0	0	8	21	37	–16	0

=== Results ===
==== Senior category ====
12 September 2017	Brazil	7–4	Colombia
11:30	Eudim; Bruno Xavier; Bryan; José Lucas; Fred	Report(es)	Alberto; Leonardo; Cordado	Referee: Micke Palomino

12 September 2017	Peru	6–4	Venezuela
15:30	Velezmoro; Drago; Delgado; Vidal	Report(es)	Muñoz; Merlin	Referee: Micke Palomino

13 September 2017	Ecuador	4–3	Venezuela
11:30	Cedeño; Bailon	Report(es)	Merlin; Iriarte	Referee: Alex Valdiviezo

13 September 2017	Peru	6–5 (a.e.t.)	Colombia
15:30	Acuña; Velezmoro; Delgado	Report(es)	Julián; Alberto (o.g.) Delgado	Referee: Micke Palomino

14 September 2017	Colombia	3–4	Venezuela
11:30	Córdoba; López; Ortega	Report(es)	Muñoz; Leon; Merlin; Millan	Referee: Alex Valdiviezo

14 September 2017	Brazil	7–3	Ecuador
15:30	Bryan; Eudim; Paulinho; José Lucas; Bruno Xavier	Report(es)	Gallegos; Cevallos; Cedeño	Referee: Micke Palomino

15 September 2017	Brazil	10–2	Venezuela
11:30	Bryan; Eudim; José Lucas; Luquinhas; Bruno Xavier; Fred; Muñoz (o.g.)	Report(es)	Iriarte; Merlin	Referee: Alex Valdiviezo

15 September 2017	Peru	2–5	Ecuador
15:30	Velezmoro	Report(es)	Cevallos; Bailón; Cedeño	Referee: Ramón Blanco

16 September 2017	Ecuador	4–3 (a.e.t.)	Colombia
11:30	Delgado; L. Cedeño; Bailón; D. Cedeño	Report(es)	Pardo; Ortega; Córdoba	Referee: Gerson Ceron

16 September 2017	Peru	2–6	Brazil
15:30	Velezmoro; Vidal	Report(es)	Bruno Xavier (o.g.) Pérez; Luquinhas; José Lucas	Referee: Micke Palomino

==== Under 20s category ====
12 September 2017	Brazil U20s	5–2	Colombia U20s
10:00	Digao; Josep; Lucas Xavier; Savio	Report(es)	Moreno; Serna	Referee: Alex Valdiviezo

12 September 2017	Peru U20s	4–5	Venezuela U20s
14:00	Rubianes; Arenas	Report(es)	Semprun; García	Referee: Gerson Ceron

13 September 2017	Ecuador U20s	6–3	Venezuela U20s
10:00	Loor; Lucas; Briones	Report(es)	Semprum; Betancourt	Referee: Wilfredo Matuco

13 September 2017	Peru U20s	1–1 (a.e.t.) (2–1 p)	Colombia U20s
14:00	Rubianes	Report(es)	?	Referee: Gerson Ceron
	Penalties
	Rubianes (penalty scored); Penalillo (penalty scored)		(penalty missed) ? (penalty scored) Hidalgo; (penalty missed) ?

14 September 2017	Colombia U20s	1–7	Venezuela U20s
10:00	Donado	Report(es)	Semprum; Ortega; R. García; F. García; Pérez (o.g.) González	Referee: Mario Escobar

14 September 2017	Brazil U20s	5–3	Ecuador U20s
14:00	Lucas Xavier; Pedrinho; Teleco; Josep	Report(es)	Lucas; Ponce; Loor	Referee: Ismael Blanco

15 September 2017	Brazil U20s	3–1	Venezuela U20s
10:00	Savio; Lucas Xavier; Digao	Report(es)	Betancourt	Referee: Gerson Ceron

15 September 2017	Peru U20s	4–4 (a.e.t.) (2–1 p)	Ecuador U20s
14:00	Mero (o.g.); Diaz; Rubianes; Carpio	Report(es)	Delgado; Macias; Loor	Referee: Marco Escobar
	Penalties
	Rubianes (penalty scored); Penalillo (penalty scored); Diaz (penalty missed)		(penalty missed) Mero; (penalty scored) Loor; (penalty missed) Macias

16 September 2017	Ecuador U20s	3–2	Colombia U20s
10:00	Delgado; Loor; Ponce	Report(es)	Hidalgo; Parra	Referee: Carlos Canales

16 September 2017	Peru U20s	3–8	Brazil U20s
14:00	Alarcón; Mori; Carpio	Report(es)	Lucas Xavier; Rai; Savio; Paulinho; Digao; Pedrinho	Referee: Neker Balabarca

== South zone ==
The South zone regular season event took place in the Paraguayan city of Lambare, Gran Asunción. All matches were hosted at the Central Court of the Resort Yacht y Golf Club Paraguayo on the banks of Paraguay River, organised in cooperation with the Paraguayan Football Association. The matches were originally scheduled to take place at Ñu Guasú Park in Luque.

Matches are listed as local time in Lambare, PYT (UTC-4).

=== Standings ===
Advance to the Finals

Pos	Team	Pld	W	W+	WP	L	GF	GA	GD	Pts
1	Team Paraguay	8	7	0	0	1	43	22	+21	21
2	Team Chile	8	4	0	0	4	38	32	+6	12
3	Team Argentina	8	4	0	0	4	25	24	+1	12
4	Team Uruguay	8	3	0	1	4	30	26	+4	10
5	Team Bolivia	8	0	0	1	7	15	47	–32	1

=== Results ===
==== Senior category ====
19 September 2017	Uruguay	7–1	Bolivia
19:00	Quinta; Cazet; Capurro; Bella	Report(es)	Eiffel Antelo

19 September 2017	Paraguay	5–2	Chile
20:15	Carvallo; Amado Rolón; Morán	Report(es)	(o.g.) Ojeda; Aguilera

20 September 2017	Argentina	4–7	Chile
19:00	Medero; Cardozo; Hilaire; Benaducci	Report(es)	Echeverria; Flores; Prieto; Chacón; Contreras; Lorenzo

20 September 2017	Paraguay	8–2	Bolivia
20:15	Carballo; Benítez; Amado; González; Morán; Agüero	Report(es)	Garzón; Huanca

21 September 2017	Chile	4–2	Bolivia
19:00	Echeverría; Flores; Bolivar	Report(es)	Oliva; D. Garzón

21 September 2017	Argentina	2–2 (a.e.t.) (3–4 p)	Uruguay
20:15	Medero	Report(es)	Quinta
	Penalties
	Laduche (penalty scored); Barrios (penalty scored); Bella (penalty scored); Cazet (penalty scored)		(penalty scored) Dallera; (penalty scored) Medero; (penalty scored) Cardozo; (penalty missed) Rigoni

22 September 2017	Argentina	4–1	Bolivia
19:00	Benaducci; Dallera	Report(es)	José Enrique Miranda

22 September 2017	Paraguay	7–2	Uruguay
20:15	Morán; González; Rolón; Benítez; Carballo; Díaz	Report(es)	Barrios; Quinta

23 September 2017	Chile	2–3	Uruguay
19:00	Fuentes; Flores	Report(es)	Bella; Cazet; Quinta

23 September 2017	Paraguay	5–2	Argentina
20:15	Carballo; Rolón; Morán	Report(es)	Cardozo

==== Under 20s category ====
19 September 2017	Uruguay U20s	9–1	Bolivia U20s
16:30	Saldaña; Cordero; Giacomassi; Quiroga; Laens; Sánchez; Matias Libbi	Report(es)	Luis Molinas

19 September 2017	Paraguay U20s	7–6	Chile U20s
17:45	Aguilar; Cantero; Benitez	Report(es)	Lepicheo; Duran; Leyton; Fuentes

20 September 2017	Argentina U20s	4–3	Chile U20s
16:30	Rutterschmidt; Bravo	Report(es)	Fuentes; Peso; Duran

20 September 2017	Paraguay U20s	4–4 (a.e.t.) (2–3 p)	Bolivia U20s
17:45	Areco; Aguilar; Cantero; V. Benítez	Report(es)	Molina; Eguez; Chaves
	Penalties
	V. Benítez (penalty scored); Aguilar (penalty scored); A. Benítez (penalty missed)		(penalty scored) Campos; (penalty scored) Guzmán; (penalty scored) Molina

21 September 2017	Chile U20s	7–3	Bolivia U20s
16:30	Fuentes; Klinsmann; Milla; Araya	Report(es)	Garzón; Beltrán; Ardaya

21 September 2017	Argentina U20s	3–1	Uruguay U20s
17:45	Bravo	Report(es)	Sánchez

22 September 2017	Argentina U20s	4–1	Bolivia U20s
16:30	Blumberg; Ponzetti; Pomar	Report(es)	Ardaya

22 September 2017	Paraguay U20s	3–2	Uruguay U20s
17:45	V. Benítez; Thompson; P. Benítez	Report(es)	Cordero (o.g.) Thompson

23 September 2017	Chile U20s	7–4	Uruguay U20s
16:30	Fuentes; Araya; Leyton; Peso	Report(es)	Cordero; Libbi; Oper

23 September 2017	Paraguay U20s	4–2	Argentina U20s
17:45	Aguilar; Escobar; A. Benítez; Thompson	Report(es)	Ponzetti; Loran

== Finals ==
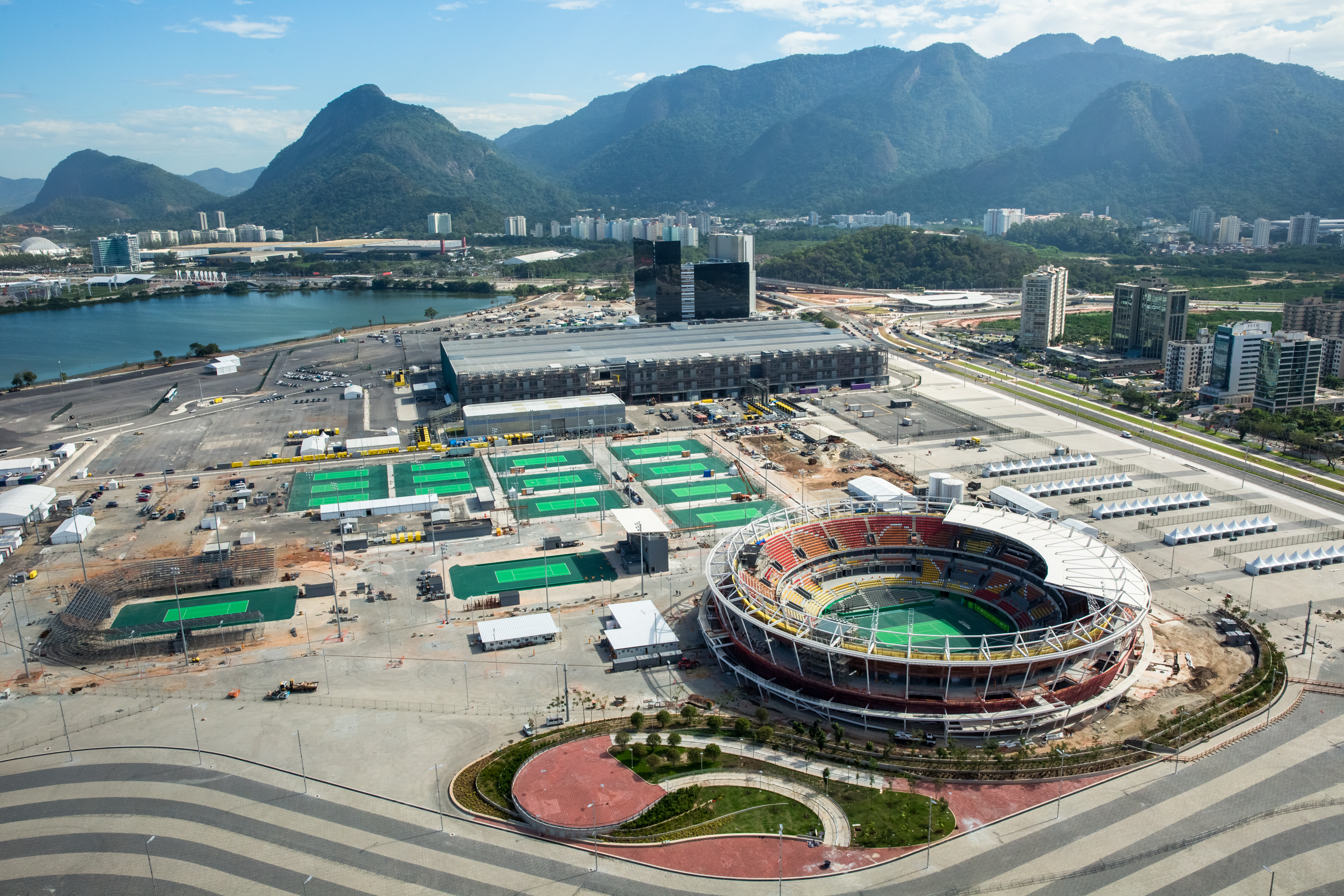
Barra Olympic Park; the Olympic Tennis Centre is shown bottom right.

The zone winners play each other for the league title; their senior teams play each other over two legs, as do their under 20s representatives for a total of four matches comprising the finals. The winners are the nation which accumulates the most points from all four matches combined.

Originally, the finals were scheduled for May 2018 in Xiamen, China. However, due to a last minute decision by the organisers, the finals were postponed on April 30 until after the 2018 FIFA World Cup.

After considering the Bahamas as the new venue, and Rosario, Argentina, the finals were eventually scheduled to take place in Rio de Janeiro, Brazil from 5–6 October.

All matches took place at a purpose built arena at Barra Olympic Park, just outside the Olympic Tennis Centre.

Matches are listed as local time in Rio de Janeiro, BRT (UTC-3).

=== Matches ===
5 October 2018
14:15

Brazil U20s	6–2	Paraguay U20s
Paulinho; Alejandro; Sávio; Josep	Report	Medina; J. Benítez

Brazil earn three points; Brazil lead the series 3–0

5 October 2018
16:00

Brazil	7–4	Paraguay
Rodrigo; Filipe; Bruno Xavier; Mauricinho; Bokinha	Report	Moran; G. Benítez

Brazil earn three points; Brazil lead the series 6–0

6 October 2018
09:15

Brazil U20s	5–4	Paraguay U20s
Paulinho; Sávio; Alejandro; Josep	Report	C. Benítez; Medina; J. Benítez

Brazil earn three points; Brazil lead the series an unassailable 9–0

6 October 2018
11:00

Brazil	6–1	Paraguay
Datinha; Mauricinho; Rodrigo	Report	Moran

Brazil earn three points; Brazil win the series 12–0

=== Winners ===
Brazil claimed a clean sweep in the finals, winning all four matches to win the series 12 points to nil.

With an unassailable lead after match three, the final match was played as a dead rubber.

2017 South American Beach Soccer League
champions

Brazil
First title

=== Awards ===
Two individual awards were presented after the last match:

Best player
(Brazil) Mauricinho
Best goalkeeper
(Paraguay) Rolando González
