= 2019 FIFA Beach Soccer World Cup qualification (CONMEBOL) =

2019 CONMEBOL qualifiers for the FIFA Beach Soccer World Cup
CONMEBOL Eliminatorias al Mundial de la FIFA de Fútbol Playa Brasil 2019

Tournament details
- Host country: Brazil
- City: Rio de Janeiro
- Dates: 28 April – 5 May
- Teams: 10 (from 1 confederation)
- Venue(s): 1 (in 1 host city)

Final positions
- Champions: Brazil (7th title)
- Runners-up: Uruguay
- Third place: Paraguay
- Fourth place: Argentina

Tournament statistics
- Matches played: 27
- Goals scored: 273 (10.11 per match)
- Top scorer(s): (Brazil) Rodrigo (14 goals)

The 2019 CONMEBOL qualifiers for the FIFA Beach Soccer World Cup, (natively in Spanish: CONMEBOL Eliminatorias al Mundial de la FIFA de Fútbol Playa Brasil 2019) was the eighth edition of the Beach Soccer World Cup qualification championship contested by the men's national teams of South America to determine the best beach soccer nation on the continent, organised by CONMEBOL. The tournament acted as a qualifying event to the 2019 FIFA Beach Soccer World Cup in Asunción, Paraguay, with the top two finishing nations progressing to the finals in addition to Paraguay who qualify automatically as hosts.

The competition took place from 28 April to 5 May 2019 in Rio de Janeiro, Brazil. Brazil were the defending champions and winners.

== Participating teams ==
All ten CONMEBOL member national teams entered the tournament.

- Argentina
- Bolivia
- Brazil (hosts and title holders)
- Chile
- Colombia
- Ecuador
- Paraguay
- Peru
- Uruguay
- Venezuela

=== Draw ===
The draw of the tournament was held on 10 April 2019 in Rio de Janeiro, Brazil during the 70th CONMEBOL Ordinary Congress. The ten teams were drawn into two groups of five. The hosts and defending champions Brazil and the 2017 vice-champions Paraguay were seeded into Group A and Group B respectively and assigned to position 1 in their group, while the remaining eight teams were placed into four "pairing pots" according to their final positions in the 2017 CONMEBOL qualifiers for the FIFA Beach Soccer World Cup (shown in brackets).

Seeded	Pot 1	Pot 2	Pot 3	Pot 4
Brazil (1) (Hosts, assigned to A1); Paraguay (2) (vice-champions, assigned to B1)	Argentina (3); Ecuador (4)	Chile (5); Colombia (6)	Peru (7); Uruguay (8)	Venezuela (9); Bolivia (10)

== Group stage ==
Each team earns three points for a win in regulation time, two points for a win in extra time, one point for a win in a penalty shoot-out, and no points for a defeat. The top two teams from each group advance to the semi-finals, while the teams in third, fourth and fifth advance to the fifth place, seventh place, and ninth place matches respectively.

All times are local, BRT (UTC−3).

=== Group A ===
Pos	Team	Pld	W	W+	WP	L	GF	GA	GD	Pts	Qualification
1	Brazil (H)	4	4	0	0	0	40	9	+31	12	Knockout stage
2	Uruguay	4	3	0	0	1	18	18	0	9	Knockout stage
3	Colombia	4	2	0	0	2	24	25	−1	6	Fifth place match
4	Ecuador	4	1	0	0	3	15	26	−11	3	Seventh place match
5	Bolivia	4	0	0	0	4	9	28	−19	0	Ninth place match

Source: CONMEBOL
Rules for classification: 1) Points; 2) Head-to-head points; 3) Head-to-head goal difference; 4) Head-to-head goals scored; 5) Goal difference; 6) Goals scored; 7) Red cards; 8) Yellow cards; 9) Drawing of lots.
(H) Host
28 April 2019
09:00

Colombia	5–8	Uruguay
	Report

Parque Olímpico, Rio de Janeiro
28 April 2019
10:30

Brazil	11–1	Bolivia
	Report

Parque Olímpico, Rio de Janeiro

29 April 2019
14:30

Uruguay	4–3	Ecuador
	Report

Parque Olímpico, Rio de Janeiro
Referee: Gustavo Dominguez (Paraguay)
29 April 2019
15:50

Brazil	9–5	Colombia
	Report

Parque Olímpico, Rio de Janeiro
Referee: Alex Valdiviezo (Peru)

30 April 2019
11:30

Ecuador	4–8	Colombia
	Report

Parque Olímpico, Rio de Janeiro
30 April 2019
13:00

Uruguay	5–1	Bolivia
	Report

Parque Olímpico, Rio de Janeiro

1 May 2019
14:30

Bolivia	4–6	Colombia
	Report

Parque Olímpico, Rio de Janeiro
1 May 2019
15:50

Brazil	11–2	Ecuador
	Report

Parque Olímpico, Rio de Janeiro

2 May 2019
13:00

Ecuador	6–3	Bolivia
	Report

Parque Olímpico, Rio de Janeiro
Referee: Mariano Romo (Argentina)
2 May 2019
15:50

Brazil	9–1	Uruguay
	Report

Parque Olímpico, Rio de Janeiro
Referee: Jorge Martínez (Paraguay)

=== Group B ===
Pos	Team	Pld	W	W+	WP	L	GF	GA	GD	Pts	Qualification
1	Paraguay	4	3	1	0	0	26	12	+14	11	Knockout stage
2	Argentina	4	1	1	1	1	17	21	−4	6	Knockout stage
3	Peru	4	1	1	0	2	21	22	−1	5	Fifth place match
4	Chile	4	1	0	0	3	15	19	−4	3	Seventh place match
5	Venezuela	4	0	0	0	4	15	20	−5	0	Ninth place match

Source: CONMEBOL
Rules for classification: 1) Points; 2) Head-to-head points; 3) Head-to-head goal difference; 4) Head-to-head goals scored; 5) Goal difference; 6) Goals scored; 7) Red cards; 8) Yellow cards; 9) Drawing of lots.
28 April 2019
11:50

Paraguay	5–3	Chile
	Report

Parque Olímpico, Rio de Janeiro
28 April 2019
13:20

Peru	6–6	Argentina
	Report
Penalties
	1–3

Parque Olímpico, Rio de Janeiro

29 April 2019
11:30

Argentina	5–4	Venezuela
	Report

Parque Olímpico, Rio de Janeiro
Referee: Jaimito Suarez (Bolivia)
29 April 2019
13:00

Paraguay	7–2	Peru
	Report

Parque Olímpico, Rio de Janeiro
Referee: Abcio Fernández (Uruguay)

30 April 2019
14:30

Venezuela	4–5 (a.e.t.)	Peru
	Report

Parque Olímpico, Rio de Janeiro
30 April 2019
15:50

Argentina	3–2 (a.e.t.)	Chile
	Report

Parque Olímpico, Rio de Janeiro

1 May 2019
11:30

Chile	5–8	Peru
	Report

Parque Olímpico, Rio de Janeiro
1 May 2019
13:00

Paraguay	5–4 (a.e.t.)	Venezuela
	Report

Parque Olímpico, Rio de Janeiro

2 May 2019
11:30

Venezuela	3–5	Chile
	Report

Parque Olímpico, Rio de Janeiro
Referee: Wilson Bravo (Ecuador)
2 May 2019
14:30

Paraguay	9–3	Argentina
	Report

Parque Olímpico, Rio de Janeiro
Referee: Christian Altez (Uruguay)

== Placement stage (5th–10th place) ==
=== Bracket (5th–10th place) ===
9th place
4 May
Bolivia	6
Venezuela	4

7th place
4 May
Ecuador	5
Chile	6

5th place
5 May
Colombia	5
Peru	6

=== Ninth place match ===
4 May 2019
9:00

Bolivia	6–4	Venezuela
	Report

Parque Olímpico, Rio de Janeiro
Referee: Pablo Defilippi (Argentina)

=== Seventh place match ===
4 May 2019
13:30

Ecuador	5–6	Chile
	Report

Parque Olímpico, Rio de Janeiro
Referee: Mayron Dos Reis (Brazil)

=== Fifth place match ===
5 May 2019
9:00

Colombia	5–6	Peru
	Report

Parque Olímpico, Rio de Janeiro

== Knockout stage ==
=== Bracket (1st–4th place) ===
Semi-finals
4 May
Paraguay	3
Uruguay	4
4 May
Brazil	9
Argentina	3

Final
5 May
Uruguay	1
Brazil	10
3rd place
5 May
Paraguay	6
Argentina	5

=== Semi-finals ===
Winners qualify for 2019 FIFA Beach Soccer World Cup.

4 May 2019
10:30

Paraguay	3–4	Uruguay
	Report

Parque Olímpico, Rio de Janeiro
Referee: Alex Valdiviezo (Peru)

4 May 2010
12:00

Brazil	9–3	Argentina
	Report

Parque Olímpico, Rio de Janeiro
Referee: José Cortez (Ecuador)

=== Third place match ===
5 May 2019
10:40

Paraguay	6–5	Argentina
	Report

Parque Olímpico, Rio de Janeiro

=== Final ===
5 May 2019
12:00

Uruguay	1–10	Brazil
	Report

Parque Olímpico, Rio de Janeiro

== Final ranking ==
Qualified for the 2019 FIFA Beach Soccer World Cup

Rank	Team
1st place, gold medalist(s)	Brazil
2nd place, silver medalist(s)	Uruguay
3rd place, bronze medalist(s)	Paraguay
4	Argentina
5	Peru
6	Colombia
7	Chile
8	Ecuador
9	Bolivia
10	Venezuela

== Qualified teams for FIFA Beach Soccer World Cup ==
The following three teams from CONMEBOL qualify for the 2019 FIFA Beach Soccer World Cup, including Paraguay who qualified automatically as host.

Team	Qualified on	Previous appearances in FIFA Beach Soccer World Cup^{1} only FIFA era (since 2005)
Paraguay	26 October 2018	3 (2013, 2015, 2017)
Uruguay	4 May 2019	5 (2005, 2006, 2007, 2008, 2009)
Brazil	4 May 2019	9 (2005, **2006**, **2007**, **2008**, **2009**, 2011, 2013, 2015, **2017**)

^{1} Bold indicates champions for that year. Italic indicates hosts for that year.
