= 2017 FIFA Beach Soccer World Cup qualification (CONMEBOL) =

2017 CONMEBOL qualifiers for the FIFA Beach Soccer World Cup
Eliminatorias CONMEBOL al Mundial de la FIFA de Fútbol Playa Asunción 2017

Tournament details
- Host country: Paraguay
- City: Lambaré
- Dates: 5–12 February
- Teams: 10 (from 1 confederation)
- Venue(s): 1 (in 1 host city)

Final positions
- Champions: Brazil (6th title)
- Runners-up: Paraguay
- Third place: Ecuador
- Fourth place: Argentina

Tournament statistics
- Matches played: 29
- Goals scored: 261 (9 per match)
- Top scorer(s): (Chile) Víctor Belaunde (11 goals)
- Best player(s): (Paraguay) Carlos Carballo
- Best goalkeeper: (Brazil) Mão

The 2017 CONMEBOL qualifiers for the FIFA Beach Soccer World Cup, (natively in Spanish: Eliminatorias CONMEBOL al Mundial de la FIFA de Fútbol Playa Asunción 2017) was the seventh edition of the Beach Soccer World Cup qualification championship contested by the men's national teams of South America to determine the best beach soccer nation on the continent, organised by CONMEBOL. The tournament acted as a qualifying event to the 2017 FIFA Beach Soccer World Cup, with the top three finishing nations progressing to the finals in the Bahamas.

The competition took place from 5 to 12 February 2017 in Lambaré, Gran Asunción, Paraguay, with ten nations taking part. Brazil were the defending champions.

== Participating teams and draw ==
The following ten teams entered the tournament.

- Argentina
- Bolivia
- Brazil
- Chile
- Colombia
- Ecuador
- Paraguay (hosts)
- Peru
- Uruguay
- Venezuela

The draw of the tournament was held on 20 January 2017, 12:00 UTC−3, at the CONMEBOL headquarters in Luque, Paraguay. The ten teams were drawn into two groups of five teams. The teams were seeded according to their results in the 2015 CONMEBOL Beach Soccer Championship.

| Pot 1 | Pot 2 | Pot 3 | Pot 4 | Pot 5 |
|---|---|---|---|---|
| Paraguay (hosts; assigned to A1); Brazil (title holders; assigned to B1) | Argentina; Ecuador | Uruguay; Peru | Chile; Colombia | Bolivia; Venezuela |

== Group stage ==
Each team earns three points for a win in regulation time, two points for a win in extra time, one point for a win in a penalty shoot-out, and no points for a defeat. The top two teams from each group advance to the semi-finals, while the bottom three teams from each group enter the placement stage for 5th to 10th place.

All times are local, PYST (UTC−3).

=== Group A ===
| Pos | Team | Pld | W | W+ | WP | L | GF | GA | GD | Pts | Qualification |
|---|---|---|---|---|---|---|---|---|---|---|---|
| 1 | Paraguay (H) | 4 | 4 | 0 | 0 | 0 | 23 | 8 | +15 | 12 | Knockout stage |
| 2 | Argentina | 4 | 3 | 0 | 0 | 1 | 16 | 13 | +3 | 9 | Knockout stage |
| 3 | Uruguay | 4 | 2 | 0 | 0 | 2 | 20 | 18 | +2 | 6 | Placement stage (5th–10th place) |
| 4 | Chile | 4 | 1 | 0 | 0 | 3 | 17 | 20 | −3 | 3 | Placement stage (5th–10th place) |
| 5 | Bolivia | 4 | 0 | 0 | 0 | 4 | 9 | 26 | −17 | 0 | Placement stage (5th–10th place) |

Source: CONMEBOL
Rules for classification: 1) Points; 2) Head-to-head points; 3) Head-to-head goal difference; 4) Head-to-head goals scored; 5) Goal difference; 6) Goals scored; 7) Red cards; 8) Yellow cards; 9) Drawing of lots (Regulations Article XII B).
Note: Tie-breaking criteria are re-applied from the beginning if any of the tied teams are removed from consideration at any point.
(H) Host
5 February 2017
18:15

| Argentina | 5–4 | Chile |
|---|---|---|
| Medero 12', 24'; Benaducci 12'; Hilaire 24'; Rodríguez 28' | Report | Soto 10'; Prieto 14'; Vega 28'; Durán 36' |

Yacht y Golf Club Paraguayo, Lambaré
5 February 2017
20:45

| Bolivia | 2–4 | Paraguay |
|---|---|---|
| Morón 13'; Suárez 20' | Report | Sánchez 11'; Barreto 16'; Rolón 26', 35' |

Yacht y Golf Club Paraguayo, Lambaré

6 February 2017
18:15

| Chile | 6–3 | Bolivia |
|---|---|---|
| Belaunde 4', 25', 33'; Prieto 25'; Vega 28'; Durán 36' | Report | Castedo 5', 14'; Alpire 32' |

Yacht y Golf Club Paraguayo, Lambaré
6 February 2017
20:45

| Argentina | 4–3 | Uruguay |
|---|---|---|
| Hilaire 1', 23'; Medero 23'; De Sosa 33' | Report | Matías 15'; Fabricio 26'; Catardo 36' |

Yacht y Golf Club Paraguayo, Lambaré

7 February 2017
18:15

| Uruguay | 11–3 | Bolivia |
|---|---|---|
| Ricar 3', 14', 35'; Maycol 3'; Catardo 3', 13'; Matías 16', 24'; Fabricio 17'; Tonga 22', 23' | Report | López 17'; Guardia 19'; Alpire 32' |

Yacht y Golf Club Paraguayo, Lambaré
7 February 2017
20:45

| Paraguay | 7–3 | Chile |
|---|---|---|
| C. Carballo 13'; Ojeda 17'; Morán 18'; Rolón 20', 32'; Barreto 23'; Benítez 34' | Report | Vega 5'; Flores 32'; Echeverría 34' |

Yacht y Golf Club Paraguayo, Lambaré

8 February 2017
18:15

| Argentina | 5–1 | Bolivia |
|---|---|---|
| Rodríguez 11', 11', 18'; Arana 31', 32' | Report | Zambrano 17' |

Yacht y Golf Club Paraguayo, Lambaré
8 February 2017
20:45

| Paraguay | 7–1 | Uruguay |
|---|---|---|
| J. López 1'; González 6'; Morán 14'; Zayas 19'; Ojeda 23'; Carballo 23', 35' | Report | Tonga 8' |

Yacht y Golf Club Paraguayo, Lambaré

9 February 2017
18:15

| Uruguay | 5–4 | Chile |
|---|---|---|
| Pampero 3'; Tonga 8'; Catardo 12'; Tonga 15'; Juan 21' | Report | Belaunde 11', 34', 36'; Echeverría 28' |

Yacht y Golf Club Paraguayo, Lambaré
9 February 2017
20:45

| Paraguay | 5–2 | Argentina |
|---|---|---|
| P. Morán 6'; Ojeda 7'; Moran 11'; Carballo 15'; J. López 24' | Report | Medero 6'; Hilaire 24' |

Yacht y Golf Club Paraguayo, Lambaré

=== Group B ===
| Pos | Team | Pld | W | W+ | WP | L | GF | GA | GD | Pts | Qualification |
|---|---|---|---|---|---|---|---|---|---|---|---|
| 1 | Brazil | 4 | 4 | 0 | 0 | 0 | 37 | 8 | +29 | 12 | Knockout stage |
| 2 | Ecuador | 4 | 2 | 0 | 1 | 1 | 15 | 21 | −6 | 7 | Knockout stage |
| 3 | Peru | 4 | 2 | 0 | 0 | 2 | 11 | 18 | −7 | 6 | Placement stage (5th–10th place) |
| 4 | Colombia | 4 | 1 | 0 | 0 | 3 | 16 | 20 | −4 | 3 | Placement stage (5th–10th place) |
| 5 | Venezuela | 4 | 0 | 0 | 0 | 4 | 8 | 20 | −12 | 0 | Placement stage (5th–10th place) |

Source: CONMEBOL
Rules for classification: 1) Points; 2) Head-to-head points; 3) Head-to-head goal difference; 4) Head-to-head goals scored; 5) Goal difference; 6) Goals scored; 7) Red cards; 8) Yellow cards; 9) Drawing of lots (Regulations Article XII B).
Note: Tie-breaking criteria are re-applied from the beginning if any of the tied teams are removed from consideration at any point.
5 February 2017
17:00

| Ecuador | 6–6 (a.e.t.) | Colombia |
|---|---|---|
| Mera 3'; Bailón 6', 8', 11', 32'; Moreira 37' | Report | Zuleta 6'; Medrano 12'; Zuleta 16'; Ortega 22', 30'; Pardo 39' |
Penalties
| Bailón (penalty missed); Álava (penalty scored); Cedeño (penalty scored) | 2–1 | (penalty missed) Ortega; (penalty scored) Medrano; (penalty missed) Zuleta |

Yacht y Golf Club Paraguayo, Lambaré
5 February 2017
19:30

| Venezuela | 2–6 | Brazil |
|---|---|---|
| Centeno 24'; Rodríguez 34' | Report | Catarino 1'; Lucão 11', 17', 28'; Bruno Xavier 22'; Rodrigo 23' |

Yacht y Golf Club Paraguayo, Lambaré

6 February 2017
17:00

| Colombia | 3–2 | Venezuela |
|---|---|---|
| Rebelón 6', 10'; Torres 18' | Report | Vaamonde 3'; Centeno 31' |

Yacht y Golf Club Paraguayo, Lambaré
6 February 2017
19:30

| Ecuador | 3–2 | Peru |
|---|---|---|
| Gallegos 8'; Bailón 10'; Vera 30' | Report | Drago 15'; Vidal 36' |

Yacht y Golf Club Paraguayo, Lambaré

7 February 2017
17:00

| Peru | 6–2 | Venezuela |
|---|---|---|
| Castro 4', 10'; Moscoso 21'; Delgado 23'; Vidal 25'; García 36' | Report | Muñoz 2', 36' |

Yacht y Golf Club Paraguayo, Lambaré
7 February 2017
19:30

| Brazil | 9–5 | Colombia |
|---|---|---|
| Mauricinho 3', 26'; Catarino 9'; Datinha 10', 21'; Lucão 22'; Daniel 23'; Rodrigo 24'; Bruno Xavier 26' | Report | Medrano 16'; Ortega 23', 34', 35'; Riascos 32' |

Yacht y Golf Club Paraguayo, Lambaré

8 February 2017
17:00

| Ecuador | 5–2 | Venezuela |
|---|---|---|
| Gallegos 6'; Moreira 18', 32'; Bailón 30'; Cevallos 30' | Report | Muñoz 1', 25' |

Yacht y Golf Club Paraguayo, Lambaré
8 February 2017
19:30

| Brazil | 11–0 | Peru |
|---|---|---|
| Fernando DDI 5'; Mauricinho 7', 19'; Lucão 12', 25'; Bruno Xavier 21'; Rodrigo 21', 35'; Lucas 28', 30'; Bokinha 36' | Report |

Yacht y Golf Club Paraguayo, Lambaré

9 February 2017
17:00

| Peru | 3–2 | Colombia |
|---|---|---|
| Vidal 8', 13'; Moscoso 36' | Report | Riascos 7'; Rebellón 18' |

Yacht y Golf Club Paraguayo, Lambaré
9 February 2017
19:30

| Brazil | 11–1 | Ecuador |
|---|---|---|
| Mauricinho 8', 24', 29'; Daniel 10'; Bokinha 17', 22', 33'; Rodrigo 28', 29', 36'; Lucão 35' | Report | Moreira 12' |

Yacht y Golf Club Paraguayo, Lambaré

== Placement stage (5th–10th place) ==
=== Bracket (5th–10th place) ===
5th place semi-finals
10 February
Chile | 10
Peru | 4
10 February
Uruguay | 4
Colombia | 7

5th place
12 February
Chile | 8
Colombia | 7
7th place
11 February
Peru (a.e.t.) | 4
Uruguay | 3

| 9th place |
| 10 February |
| Bolivia | 0 |
| Venezuela | 6 |

=== 9th place match ===
10 February 2017
18:15

| Bolivia | 0–6 | Venezuela |
|---|---|---|
| | Report | Centeno 21', 23', 24'; Rodríguez 25'; Vaamonde 32', 34' |

Yacht y Golf Club Paraguayo, Lambaré

=== 5th place semi-finals ===
10 February 2017
19:30

| Chile | 10–4 | Peru |
|---|---|---|
| Argote 2'; Flores 4', 12', 24'; Argote 8'; Soto 15', 21'; Belaunde 15', 21', 31' | Report | Vidal 2', 24'; Castro 4'; Delgado 36' |

Yacht y Golf Club Paraguayo, Lambaré
10 February 2017
20:45

| Uruguay | 4–7 | Colombia |
|---|---|---|
| Tonga 8'; Catardo 28', 33'; Vallarino 33' | Report | Ortega 1'; Anaya 8'; Pardo 16'; Riascos 20', 28', 33'; Galindo 22' |

Yacht y Golf Club Paraguayo, Lambaré

=== 7th place match ===
11 February 2017
18:15

| Peru | 4–3 (a.e.t.) | Uruguay |
|---|---|---|
| García 7'; Arteaga 9'; Vidal 35'; Drago 38' | Report | Tonga 34', 36'; Pampero 36' |

Yacht y Golf Club Paraguayo, Lambaré

=== 5th place match ===
12 February 2017
18:15

| Chile | 8–7 | Colombia |
|---|---|---|
| Belaunde ?', ?'; Albuerno ?', ?'; Argote ?'; Abarca ?'; Durán ?'; Soto ?' | Report | Ortega ?', ?', ?'; Rebellón ?', ?'; Pardo ?'; Riascos ?' |

Yacht y Golf Club Paraguayo, Lambaré

== Knockout stage ==
=== Bracket (1st–4th place) ===
Semi-finals
11 February
Brazil | 7
Argentina | 1
11 February
Paraguay (a.e.t.) | 5
Ecuador | 3

Final
12 February
Brazil | 7
Paraguay | 5
3rd place
12 February
Argentina | 4 (0)
Ecuador (p) | 4 (1)

=== Semi-finals ===
Winners qualify for 2017 FIFA Beach Soccer World Cup.

11 February 2017
19:30

| Brazil | 7–1 | Argentina |
|---|---|---|
| Daniel 6'; Catarino 8'; Mauricinho 9'; Bokinha 17'; Lucão 23'; Lucas 30', 36' | Report | Hilaire 30' |

Yacht y Golf Club Paraguayo, Lambaré
11 February 2017
20:45

| Paraguay | 5–3 (a.e.t.) | Ecuador |
|---|---|---|
| Carballo 1', 37', 38'; Sánchez 1'; López 20' | Report | Gallegos 18', 27'; Moreira 32' |

Yacht y Golf Club Paraguayo, Lambaré

=== 3rd place match ===
Winner qualifies for 2017 FIFA Beach Soccer World Cup.

12 February 2017
19:30

| Argentina | 4–4 (a.e.t.) | Ecuador |
|---|---|---|
| Benaducci 3', 18'; Medero 16', 34' | Report | Moreira 4', 24', 34'; Gallegos 20' |
Penalties
| Medero (penalty missed); Rodríguez (penalty missed); Galván (penalty missed) | 0–1 | (penalty missed) Alava; (penalty missed) Moreira; (penalty scored) Bailón |

Yacht y Golf Club Paraguayo, Lambaré

=== Final ===
12 February 2017
20:45

| Brazil | 7–5 | Paraguay |
|---|---|---|
| Bruno Xavier 2', 11', 31'; Rodrigo 11', 36'; Lucão 15'; Mauricinho 24' | Report | Morán 5', 13', 20', 21'; Sánchez 34' |

Yacht y Golf Club Paraguayo, Lambaré

== Awards ==
=== Winners ===
2017 CONMEBOL Beach Soccer
Championship champions

Brazil
Sixth title

=== Individual awards ===
The following awards were given at the conclusion of the tournament.

Most valuable player
(Paraguay) Carlos Carballo
Top scorer
(Chile) Víctor Belaunde (11 goals)
Best goalkeeper
(Brazil) Mão

== Final ranking ==
Qualified for the 2017 FIFA Beach Soccer World Cup

| Rank | Team |
|---|---|
| 1st place, gold medalist(s) | Brazil |
| 2nd place, silver medalist(s) | Paraguay |
| 3rd place, bronze medalist(s) | Ecuador |
| 4 | Argentina |
| 5 | Chile |
| 6 | Colombia |
| 7 | Peru |
| 8 | Uruguay |
| 9 | Venezuela |
| 10 | Bolivia |

=== Qualified teams for FIFA Beach Soccer World Cup ===
The following three teams from CONMEBOL qualified for the 2017 FIFA Beach Soccer World Cup.

| Team | Qualified on | Previous appearances in tournament^{1} only FIFA-sanctioned era (since 2005) |
|---|---|---|
| Brazil | 11 February 2017 | 8 (2005, **2006**, **2007**, **2008**, **2009**, 2011, 2013, 2015) |
| Paraguay | 11 February 2017 | 2 (2013, 2015) |
| Ecuador | 12 February 2017 | 0 (Debut) |

^{1} Bold indicates champion for that year. Italic indicates host for that year.
