= 2015 South American Beach Soccer Championship =

2015 FIFA Beach Soccer World Cup CONMEBOL qualifier
2015 South American Beach Soccer Championship

Tournament details
- Host country: Ecuador
- City: Manta
- Dates: 19–26 April
- Teams: 10 (from 1 confederation)
- Venue: 1 (in 1 host city)

Final positions
- Champions: Brazil (5th title)
- Runners-up: Paraguay
- Third place: Argentina
- Fourth place: Ecuador

Tournament statistics
- Matches played: 29
- Goals scored: 268 (9.24 per match)
- Top scorer(s): (Brazil) Luis Do Nacimiento "Datinha" (12 goals)
- Best player: (Ecuador) Segundo Moreira
- Best goalkeeper: (Paraguay) Ivan Fernández

The 2015 FIFA Beach Soccer World Cup CONMEBOL qualifier, also commonly known as the 2015 South American Beach Soccer Championship, was the sixth Beach Soccer World Cup qualification championship for South America, held from April 19–26 at Playa del Murciélago, in Manta, Ecuador.

The qualifiers were not coordinated by CONMEBOL at the time. The event was organised by Beach Soccer Worldwide (BSWW), under the FIFA Beach Soccer World Cup Qualifier title. CONMEBOL reported on the event under the title of South American Beach Soccer Championship. CONMEBOL eventually began organising the qualifiers in 2017, under a new title.

Brazil defeated Paraguay to be crowned champions, and both teams together with third place Argentina qualified for the 2015 FIFA Beach Soccer World Cup.

== Participating teams and draw ==
A total of 10 teams entered the tournament. This was the first time in the history of the CONMEBOL Beach Soccer Championship that all ten CONMEBOL teams participated in the competition.

- Argentina
- Bolivia
- Brazil
- Chile
- Colombia
- Ecuador (hosts)
- Paraguay
- Peru
- Uruguay
- Venezuela

The draw of the tournament was held on 27 March 2015 at Luque. The 10 teams were drawn into two groups of five teams.

== Group stage ==
Each team earns three points for a win in regulation time, two points for a win in extra time, one point for a win in a penalty shoot-out, and no points for a defeat.

Legend
The top two teams from each group advance to the semi-finals

All times are local, Ecuador Time (UTC−5).

=== Group A ===
Pos	Team	Pld	W	WE	WP	L	GF	GA	GD	Pts	Qualification
1	Paraguay	4	4	0	0	0	29	14	+15	12	Knockout stage
2	Ecuador (H)	4	3	0	0	1	16	18	−2	9	Knockout stage
3	Chile	4	2	0	0	2	17	17	0	6	Classification stage (5th place)
4	Colombia	4	0	1	0	3	10	16	−6	2	Classification stage (5th place)
5	Bolivia	4	0	0	0	4	10	17	−7	0	Classification stage (9th place)

Source: CONMEBOL
(H) Host
19 April 2015
14:15

Paraguay	5–4	Colombia
Orlando Zayas 8'; Jesús Amado Rolón 13', 23'; Juan López 30'; Pedro Morán 32'	Report 1 Report 2	Jorge Andrés Saavedra Brache 6'; Omar Julián Ortega González 11'; Jorge Luis Cabrera Ropero 11'; Camilo Ernesto González Hernández 14'

Playa del Murciélago, Manta
19 April 2015
16:45

Bolivia	3–4	Ecuador
Pablo Alejandro Zapata Molina 1'; Carlos Guardia Gutiérrez 23'; Alan Enzo Aguilar Torrico 24'	Report 1 Report 2	Segundo Moreira 18'; Cristian Gallegos 23', 30'; Jorge Bailón 32'

Playa del Murciélago, Manta

20 April 2015
14:15

Colombia	1–0 (a.e.t.)	Bolivia
Camilo Ernesto González Hernández 38'	Report 1 Report 2

Playa del Murciélago, Manta
20 April 2015
16:45

Paraguay	7–3	Chile
Pedro Morán 2', 27', 31'; Juan López 3', 30'; Sebastián Amarilla 11'; Jesús Amado Rolón 25'	Report 1 Report 2	Arnold Hernán Durán Mancilla 2', 25'; Victor Manuel Alejandro Belaunde Muñoz 33'

Playa del Murciélago, Manta

21 April 2015
14:15

Chile	4–2	Bolivia
Victor Manuel Alejandro Belaunde Muñoz 21'; Ignacio Javier Ponce Pizarro 21'; Juan Roberto Barraza Pacheco 23'; Cristian Medalla Esquer 33'	Report 1 Report 2	Pedro Luis López Moreno 19'; Iver Eduardo Castedo 31'

Playa del Murciélago, Manta
21 April 2015
16:45

Ecuador	5–2	Colombia
Hugo Ceballos 2'; Cristian Gallegos 8'; Segundo Moreira 16', 33'; Virley Conforme 35'	Report 1 Report 2	Omar Julián Ortega González 21'; Camilo Ernesto González Hernández 35'

Playa del Murciélago, Manta

22 April 2015
13:00

Paraguay	8–5	Bolivia
Sebastián Amarilla 1'; Roberto Acuña 1'; Jesús Amado Rolón 10', 27'; Juan López 13'; Pedro Morán 16', 33'; Orlando Zayas 21'	Report 1 Report 2	Carlos Guardia Gutiérrez 20'; Berthy Alpire 21'; Iver Eduardo Castedo 24'; Pedro Luis López Moreno 27'; Roberto Acuña 27' (o.g.)

Playa del Murciélago, Manta
22 April 2015
16:45

Ecuador	5–4	Chile
Segundo Moreira 3', 34'; Daniel Cedeño 20'; Virley Conforme 29'; Hugo Ceballos 36'	Report 1 Report 2	Alberto Andrés Echeverría Alegría 5', 24'; Sergio Javier Argote Navarrete 21'; Sebastián Bolívar 31'

Playa del Murciélago, Manta

23 April 2015
14:15

Chile	6–3	Colombia
Diego Estay Lama 12'; Victor Manuel Alejandro Belaunde Muñoz 13', 14'; Alberto Andrés Echeverría Alegría 18', 23'; Abel Valenzuela 34'	Report 1 Report 2	Sergio Javier Argote Navarrete 7' (o.g.); Marcos Henrique Prado León 24'; Omar Julián Ortega González 29'

Playa del Murciélago, Manta
23 April 2015
16:45

Ecuador	2–9	Paraguay
Jorge Bailón 4'; Cristian Gallegos 33'	Report 1 Report 2	Pedro Morán 1', 27'; Edgar Barreto 4'; Jesús Amado Rolón 16', 27'; Juan López 28'; Marcos Benítez 33', 33', 34'

Playa del Murciélago, Manta

=== Group B ===
Pos	Team	Pld	W	WE	WP	L	GF	GA	GD	Pts	Qualification
1	Brazil	4	3	0	0	1	26	14	+12	9	Knockout stage
2	Argentina	4	2	0	1	1	23	22	+1	7	Knockout stage
3	Peru	4	2	0	0	2	24	21	+3	6	Classification stage (5th place)
4	Uruguay	4	2	0	0	2	17	21	−4	6	Classification stage (5th place)
5	Venezuela	4	0	0	0	4	15	27	−12	0	Classification stage (9th place)

Source: CONMEBOL
19 April 2015
13:00

Brazil	7–3	Peru
Luis Do Nacimiento "Datinha" 8', 33'; Anderson Dias Lima 10'; Rodrigo da Costa 13'; Sidney Ribeiro Souto 16', 32'; Gabriel Novaes de Moura 35'	Report 1 Report 2	Billyvardo Velezmoro Cortez 15'; Sócrates Vidal Moscoso 27'; Javier Zagaceta Isla 35'

Playa del Murciélago, Manta
19 April 2015
15:30

Venezuela	6–7	Argentina
Kevin Camargo 2'; Alexander Vaamonde 3', 7'; Winder Muñoz 27'; Antonio Ramírez 28'; Francisco Landaeta 36'	Report 1 Report 2	Federico Hilaire 7'; Jonathan Levi 8', 9'; César Leguizamón 11'; Rodrigo López 16'; Luciano Sirico 25'; Lucas Medero 34'

Playa del Murciélago, Manta

20 April 2015
13:00

Peru	7–4	Venezuela
Javier Zagaceta Isla 1'; Angelo Castro Gordillo 7'; Andy Wladimir Moscoso Reyes 8'; José Andrés Rey Sandoval 17'; Enzon Delgado Martínez 18'; Sócrates Vidal Moscoso 33'; Billyvardo Velezmoro Cortez 36'	Report 1 Report 2	Francisco Landaeta 13'; Alexander Vaamonde 24', 33'; Alberto Rodríguez 29'

Playa del Murciélago, Manta
20 April 2015
15:30

Brazil	6–3	Uruguay
Daniel Nogueira Lima 8'; Gabriel Novaes de Moura 13'; Bruno da Silva Xavier 14', 15'; Rodrigo da Costa 27'; Luis Do Nacimiento "Datinha" 32'	Report 1 Report 2	Martín Díaz 11'; Matías Cabrera 15'; Richard Catardo Olivera 32'

Playa del Murciélago, Manta

21 April 2015
13:00

Uruguay	5–4	Venezuela
Matías Cabrera 4'; Marcelo Capurro 9'; Martín Díaz 15', 29'; Richard Catardo Olivera 20'	Report 1 Report 2	Winder Muñoz 2', 15'; Alberto Rodríguez 22'; Kevin Camargo 25'

Playa del Murciélago, Manta
21 April 2015
15:30

Argentina	6–6 (a.e.t.)	Peru
Federico Costas 8', 28'; Lucas Medero 28', 31', 32'; Luciano Sirico 38'	Report 1 Report 2	Javier Zagaceta Isla 1', 39'; Yomar Pérez Panana 9', 26'; Sócrates Vidal Moscoso 23', 35'
Penalties
Luciano Franceschini (penalty missed); Lucas Medero (penalty scored)	1–0	(penalty missed) Javier Zagaceta Isla; (penalty missed) Angelo Castro Gordillo; (penalty missed) Sócrates Vidal Moscoso

Playa del Murciélago, Manta

22 April 2015
14:15

Brazil	8–1	Venezuela
Luis Do Nacimiento "Datinha" 8'; Mauricio Pereira Braz de Oliveira 10'; Bruno da Silva Xavier 19', 21', 29'; Gabriel Novaes de Moura 23'; Daniel Nogueira Lima 26'; Fernando Valença 29'	Report 1 Report 2	Alberto Rodríguez 13'

Playa del Murciélago, Manta
22 April 2015
15:30

Argentina	3–5	Uruguay
Federico Costas 7'; Lucas Medero 19'; Jonathan Levi 30'	Report 1 Report 2	Gonzalo Rosa 12'; Fabricio Vallarino 20'; Matías Cabrera 27'; Sarandi Sobral 32', 35'

Playa del Murciélago, Manta

23 April 2015
13:00

Uruguay	4–8	Peru
Marcelo Capurro 11'; Sarandi Sobral 31', 35'; Gonzalo Rosa 33'	Report 1 Report 2	Billyvardo Velezmoro Cortez 3'; Angelo Castro Gordillo 7', 17', 35'; Javier Zagaceta Isla 17'; Sócrates Vidal Moscoso 29', 36'; Andy Wladimir Moscoso Reyes 32'

Playa del Murciélago, Manta
23 April 2015
15:30

Argentina	7–5	Brazil
Lucas Medero 2', 25'; César Leguizamón 19', 29'; Federico Costas 25'; Luciano Sirico 36'; Santiago Hilaire 36'	Report 1 Report 2	Rodrigo da Costa 4', 7', 30'; Luis Do Nacimiento "Datinha" 24'; Mauricio Pereira Braz de Oliveira 34'

Playa del Murciélago, Manta

== Knockout stage ==
=== Bracket ===
Semi-finals
25 April
Brazil	14
Ecuador	1
25 April
Paraguay	4
Argentina	1

Final
26 April
Brazil	8
Paraguay	3
Third place
26 April
Ecuador	4 (0)
Argentina (p)	4 (1)

Fifth Place Semi-finals
24 April
Colombia	4
Peru (a.e.t.)	5
24 April
Chile	2
Uruguay	5

Fifth Place
26 April
Peru	2
Uruguay	3
Seventh Place
25 April
Colombia	3
Chile	9

Ninth Place
24 April
Bolivia	5
Venezuela	4

=== Fifth place semi-finals ===
24 April 2015
15:30

Colombia	4–5 (a.e.t.)	Peru
Erich Emilio Moshamer Moreno 1', 28'; Yeison Andrés Larrahondo Cortes 22'; Jeisson Levid Sánchez Escobar 35'	Report 1 Report 2	José Andrés Rey Sandoval 15'; Sócrates Vidal Moscoso 20'; Angelo Castro Gordillo 28'; Gustavo Acuña Vilela 31'; Andy Wladimir Moscoso Reyes 38'

Playa del Murciélago, Manta
24 April 2015
16:45

Chile	2–5	Uruguay
Alberto Andrés Echeverría Alegría 27'; Sebastián Bolívar 32'	Report 1 Report 2	Marcelo Capurro 10'; Matías Cabrera 26'; Fabricio Vallarino 27'; Sarandi Sobral 27'; Gonzalo Rosa 32'

Playa del Murciélago, Manta

=== Semi-finals ===
25 April 2015
15:30

Brazil	14–1	Ecuador
Fernando Valença 1', 4', 20'; Sidney Ribeiro Souto 2'; Daniel Nogueira Lima 10', 30'; Luis Do Nacimiento "Datinha" 11', 28', 28'; Mauricio Pereira Braz de Oliveira 14'; Bruno da Silva Xavier 24'; Gabriel Novaes de Moura 28', 29'; Roberto Luis de Araújo "Betinho" 30'	Report 1 Report 2	José "Macula" Vera 24'

Playa del Murciélago, Manta
25 April 2015
16:45

Paraguay	4–1	Argentina
Jesús Amado Rolón 2'; Juan López 3'; Pedro Morán 18'; Marcos Benítez 24'	Report 1 Report 2	Santiago Hilaire 18'

Playa del Murciélago, Manta

=== Ninth place match ===
24 April 2015
14:15

Bolivia	5–4	Venezuela
Pablo Alejandro Zapata Molina 11'; Berthy Alpire 14'; Julio César Zambrano 16'; Robert Yimmi Guzmán 18'; Pedro Luis López Moreno 34'	Report 1 Report 2	Winder Muñoz 8'; Hector Muñoz 14', 22'; Jonathan Moreno 19'

Playa del Murciélago, Manta

=== Seventh place match ===
25 April 2015
14:15

Colombia	3–9	Chile
John Santiago Riascos Hurtado 3'; Omar Julián Ortega González 6'; Jorge Luis Cabrera Ropero 22'	Report 1 Report 2	Alberto Andrés Echeverría Alegría 4', 6'; Victor Manuel Alejandro Belaunde Muñoz 5', 6', 34'; Arnold Hernán Durán Mancilla 23'; Cristian Medalla Esquer 28', 29'; Pablo Alejandro Rodríguez Vega 34'

Playa del Murciélago, Manta

=== Fifth place match ===
26 April 2015
14:15

Peru	2–3	Uruguay
Angelo Castro Gordillo 22', 24'	Report 1 Report 2	Fabricio Vallarino 12'; Diego Pastoriza 21', 24'

Playa del Murciélago, Manta

=== Third place match ===
26 April 2015
15:30

Ecuador	4–4 (a.e.t.)	Argentina
Segundo Moreira 24', 32', 33'; Virley Conforme 30'	Report 1 Report 2	Federico Costas 19', 25'; Lucas Medero 19', 28'
Penalties
Jorge Bailón (penalty missed); Segundo Moreira (penalty missed); Virley Conforme (penalty missed)	0–1	(penalty scored) Lucas Medero; (penalty missed) Luciano Franceschini

Playa del Murciélago, Manta

=== Final ===
26 April 2015
16:45

Brazil	8–3	Paraguay
Rodrigo da Costa 5'; Bruno da Silva Xavier 8', 21'; Luis Do Nacimiento "Datinha" 10', 19', 26', 28'; Gabriel Novaes de Moura 16'	Report 1 Report 2	Pedro Morán 10'; Edgar Barreto 21'; Juan López 34'

Playa del Murciélago, Manta

== Final ranking ==
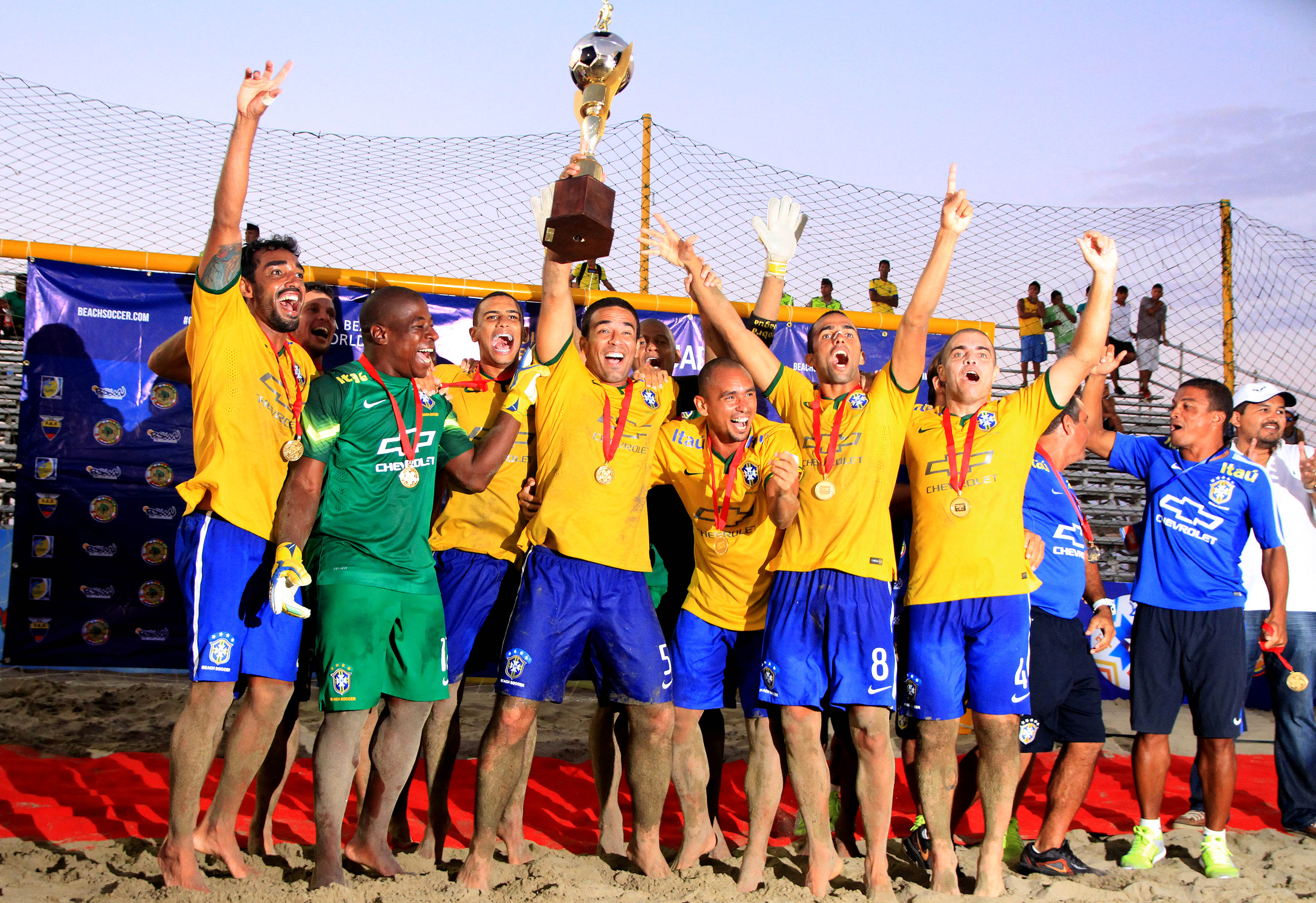
Brazil's team celebrating winning the tournament.

Qualified for 2015 FIFA Beach Soccer World Cup

Rank	Team
1st place, gold medalist(s)	Brazil
2nd place, silver medalist(s)	Paraguay
3rd place, bronze medalist(s)	Argentina
4	Ecuador
5	Uruguay
6	Peru
7	Chile
8	Colombia
9	Bolivia
10	Venezuela

== Awards ==
Best Player (MVP)	Top Scorer(s)	Best Goalkeeper
(Ecuador) Segundo Moreira	(Brazil) Luis Do Nacimiento "Datinha"	(Paraguay) Ivan Fernández

== Top goalscorers ==
12 goals

- (Brazil) Luis Do Nacimiento "Datinha"

10 goals

- (Paraguay) Pedro Morán

9 goals

- (Argentina) Lucas Medero

8 goals

- (Brazil) Bruno da Silva Xavier
- (Ecuador) Segundo Moreira
- (Paraguay) Jesús Amado Rolón

7 goals

- (Chile) Victor Manuel Alejandro Belaunde Muñoz
- (Chile) Alberto Andrés Echeverría Alegría
- (Paraguay) Juan López
- (Peru) Angelo Castro Gordillo
- (Peru) Sócrates Vidal Moscoso
