= Ecuador national beach soccer team =

National beach soccer team of Ecuador

Ecuador
- Nickname(s): La Tricolor (the Tricolor); La Tri; Los Amarillos (the Yellows)
- Association: Federación Ecuatoriana de Fútbol (FEF)
- Confederation: CONMEBOL (South America)
- Head coach: José Palma
- Captain: Hugo Cevallos
- FIFA code: ECU
- BSWW ranking: 55 ▼1 (1 June 2026)
First colours
Second colours

First international
- Brazil 8–3 Ecuador (Montevideo, Uruguay; 11 March 2009)

Biggest win
- Ecuador 10–3 Dominican Republic (Lima, Peru; 7 November 2012)

Biggest defeat
- Ecuador 1–14 Brazil (Manta, Ecuador; 25 April 2015)

The Ecuador national beach soccer team represents Ecuador in international beach soccer competitions and is controlled by the Ecuadorian Football Federation, the governing body for football in Ecuador.

The team made their debut in international beach soccer at the 2009 World Cup qualifiers. Having reached the semi-finals of the World Cup qualifying championship on three previous occasions without finishing as one of the top three nations who qualify for the World Cup, Ecuador finally secured their first qualification to the FIFA Beach Soccer World Cup in 2017.

== Current squad ==
As of February 2017

Note: Flags indicate national team as defined under FIFA eligibility rules; some limited exceptions apply. Players may hold more than one non-FIFA nationality.

No.	Pos.	Nation	Player
1	GK	ECU	Carlos Saltos
2	DF	ECU	Hugo Cevallos (captain)
3	FW	ECU	Cesar Barre
4	DF	ECU	Mario Alava
5	MF	ECU	José Vera
6	MF	ECU	Cristhian Gallegos

No.	Pos.	Nation	Player
7	MF	ECU	Segundo Moreira
8	MF	ECU	Jorge Bailón
9	MF	ECU	Daniel Cedeño
10	MF	ECU	Mauricio Mera
11	MF	ECU	Joffre Delgado
12	GK	ECU	Jorge León

Coach: José Palma

== Achievements ==
- CONMEBOL Beach Soccer Championship Best: 3rd place
  - 2017
- South American Beach Games Best: 3rd place
  - 2011
- Copa América Best: 9th place
  - 2016
- Bolivarian Beach Games Best: 3rd place
  - 2014

== Competitive record ==
=== FIFA Beach Soccer World Cup ===
Year	Result	Pld	W	W+	L	GF	GA	GD
1995 to 2008	did not enter							
2009 to 2015	did not qualify							
(The Bahamas) 2017	Group stage	3	0	0	3	6	22	–16
(Paraguay) 2019	did not qualify							
(Russia) 2021	did not qualify							
(United Arab Emirates) 2023	to be determined							
(Seychelles) 2025	to be determined							
Total	1/21	3	0	0	3	6	22	–16

=== CONMEBOL Beach Soccer Championship ===
Year	Result	Pld	W	W+	L	GF	GA	GD
(Brazil) 2005^{†}	did not enter							
(Brazil) 2006	did not enter							
(Mexico) 2007^{†}	did not enter							
(Argentina) 2008	did not enter							
(Uruguay) 2009	4th place	5	2	0	3	27	30	–3
(Brazil) 2011	8th place	3	0	0	3	9	21	–12
(Argentina) 2013	4th place	5	2	0	3	18	29	–11
(Ecuador) 2015	4th place	6	3	0	3	21	36	–15
(Paraguay) 2017	3rd place	6	2	2	2	22	30	–8
Total	5/9	25	9	2	14	97	146	–49

† – Note: 2005 and 2007 were held in a joint championship with CONCACAF

== Sources ==
- BSWW Profile
- Squad
- Results
