= 2006 South American Beach Soccer Championship =

2006 FIFA Beach Soccer World Cup CONMEBOL qualifier
2006 South American Beach Soccer Championship

Tournament details
- Host country: Brazil
- Dates: 5–12 March
- Teams: 6 (from 1 confederation)
- Venue: 1 (in 1 host city)

Final positions
- Champions: Brazil (1st title)
- Runners-up: Uruguay
- Third place: Argentina
- Fourth place: Venezuela

Tournament statistics
- Matches played: 19
- Goals scored: 163 (8.58 per match)
- Top scorer(s): (Brazil) Jorginho (14 goals)

The 2006 FIFA Beach Soccer World Cup CONMEBOL qualifier, also later and commonly known as the 2006 South American Beach Soccer Championship, was the first Beach Soccer World Cup qualification championship for South America, held from 5–12 March in Macaé, Brazil.

The qualifiers were not coordinated by CONMEBOL at the time. The event was instead organised by Beach Soccer Worldwide (BSWW), under the title of FIFA Beach Soccer World Cup Qualifier. CONMEBOL first recognised the tournament in 2013, under the title South American Beach Soccer Championship, also acknowledging the 2006–11 events as historic editions of the championship. CONMEBOL eventually began organising the qualifiers in 2017, under a new title.

Hosts Brazil won the championship, with Uruguay finishing second. Argentina won the third place play-off to claim third. These three nations moved on to play in the 2006 FIFA Beach Soccer World Cup in Rio de Janeiro, Brazil from 2–12 November.

== Competing nations ==
- Argentina
- Brazil (hosts)
- Paraguay
- Peru
- Uruguay
- Venezuela

== Group stage ==
Team	Pld	W	W+	L	GF	GA	GD	Pts
Brazil	5	5	0	0	47	12	+35	15
Argentina	5	4	0	1	20	14	+6	12
Uruguay	5	1	2	2	16	19	-3	7
Venezuela	5	1	1	3	15	30	-15	5
Paraguay	5	1	0	4	20	24	-4	3
Peru	5	0	0	5	7	25	-18	0

=== Day 1 ===
5 March 2006

Uruguay	6 – 5 (extra-time)	Paraguay

Macaé, Brazil

5 March 2006

Argentina	4 – 2	Peru

Macaé, Brazil

5 March 2006

Brazil	15 – 2	Venezuela

Macaé, Brazil

=== Day 2 ===
6 March 2006

Peru	2 – 2 0-1 (pens.)	Uruguay

Macaé, Brazil

6 March 2006

Argentina	6 – 3	Venezuela

Macaé, Brazil

6 March 2006

Brazil	9 – 5	Paraguay

Macaé, Brazil

=== Day 3 ===
7 March 2006

Paraguay	4 – 4 3-4 (pens.)	Venezuela

Macaé, Brazil

7 March 2006

Uruguay	1 – 4	Argentina

Macaé, Brazil

7 March 2006

Brazil	11 – 0	Peru

Macaé, Brazil

=== Day 4 ===
8 March 2006

Peru	1 – 4	Paraguay

Macaé, Brazil

8 March 2006

Venezuela	2 – 3	Uruguay

Macaé, Brazil

8 March 2006

Brazil	6 – 1	Argentina

Macaé, Brazil

=== Day 5 ===
9 March 2006

Paraguay	2 – 5	Argentina

Macaé, Brazil

9 March 2006

Venezuela	4 – 2	Peru

Macaé, Brazil

9 March 2006

Brazil	6 – 4	Uruguay

Macaé, Brazil

== Knockout stage ==
Semi-finals
10 March 2006
Argentina	4
Uruguay	5 (AET)
10 March 2006
Brazil	15
Venezuela	1

Final
12 March 2006
Brazil	9
Uruguay	2
Third place
11 March 2006
Argentina	2
Venezuela	0

== Winners ==
(2006) FIFA Beach Soccer World Cup
Qualification (CONMEBOL) Winners:

Brazil
First title

== Awards ==
Top Scorer
(Brazil) Jorginho
14 goals

== Final standings ==
Rank	Team
1	Brazil
2	Uruguay
3	Argentina
4	Venezuela
5	Paraguay
6	Peru
