= South American Beach Games =

Multi-sport athletic event

- 2009; 2011; 2014; 2019; 2023
- Beach handball; Beach rugby; Beach soccer; Beach tennis; Beach volleyball; Beach wrestling; Open water swimming; Rowing beach sprint; Sailing; Skateboarding; Surfing; Triathlon; Underwater sports; Water skiing

South American Beach Games
- Purpose: Beach multi-sport event for South America
- Frequency: Every four years
- Inaugurated: 2009 in Montevideo, Uruguay
- Most recent: 2023 in Santa Marta, Colombia
- Website: odesur.org

The South American Beach Games (Spanish: Juegos Suramericanos de Playa; Portuguese: Jogos Sul-Americanos de Praia) is a biennial multi-sport event in beach sports between athletes representing nations from South America. It is organised by ODESUR (the South American Sports Organization). The first event was held in 2009.

== Editions ==
Year	Games	Host city	Country	Dates	Nations	Sports	Medals Winner
2009	I	Montevideo	Uruguay	3–13 December	15	10	Brazil
2011	II	Manta	Ecuador	2–12 December	10	9	Brazil
2014	III	Vargas	Venezuela	14–24 May	14	10	Venezuela
2019	IV	Rosario	Argentina	14–23 March	14	13	Argentina
2023	V	Santa Marta	Colombia	14–21 July	15	14	Colombia
2027	VI	Iquique	Chile	4–15 March			

== Sports ==
As of the last edition (2023), a total of 14 sports are played:

- Beach handball
- Beach rugby
- Beach soccer
- Beach tennis
- Beach volleyball
- Beach wrestling
- Open water swimming
- Rowing beach sprint
- Sailing
- Skateboarding
- Surfing
- Triathlon
- Underwater sports
- Water skiing

== Medals (2009—2023) ==
Rank	Nation	Gold	Silver	Bronze	Total
1	Brazil (BRA)	52	34	29	115
2	Argentina (ARG)	49	54	54	157
3	Venezuela (VEN)	29	39	27	95
4	Peru (PER)	26	13	14	53
5	Colombia (COL)	22	24	20	66
6	Ecuador (ECU)	18	16	21	55
7	Chile (CHI)	15	15	30	60
8	Uruguay (URU)	4	11	13	28
9	Paraguay (PAR)	2	8	5	15
10	Aruba (ARU)	0	2	1	3
11	Panama (PAN)	0	1	4	5
Totals (11 entries)		217	217	218	652

== See also ==
- African Beach Games
- Asian Beach Games
- Mediterranean Beach Games
- World Beach Games
