= Uruguay national beach soccer team =

National beach soccer team representing Uruguay

Uruguay
- Nickname(s): La Celeste, Los Charrúas
- Association: Uruguayan Football Association
- Confederation: CONMEBOL (South America)
- Head coach: Fernando Rosa
- Captain: Diego Monserrat
- FIFA code: URU
- BSWW ranking: 39 ▼2 (2 September 2026)
First colours
Second colours

First international
- Uruguay 6–7 Italy (January 1995)

Biggest win
- Uruguay 10–0 South Africa (January 1999)

Biggest defeat
- Uruguay 2–13 Brazil (Rio de Janeiro, Brazil; 27 February 1999); Uruguay 0–11 Brazil (Florianópolis, Brazil; 16 December 2006)

World Cup
- Appearances: 7
- Best result: Runners-up (2006)

CONMEBOL Beach Soccer Championship
- Appearances: 11 (first in 2006)
- Best result: Runners-up (2006, 2009, 2019, 2021)

The Uruguay national beach soccer team represents Uruguay in international beach soccer competitions and is controlled by the AUF, the governing body for football in Uruguay.

== Results and fixtures ==
The following is a list of match results in the last 12 months, as well as any future matches that have been scheduled.

Legend

Win Draw Lose Fixture

== Players ==
=== Current squad ===
The following players and staff members were called up for the 2021 FIFA Beach Soccer World Cup.

Note: Flags indicate national team as defined under FIFA eligibility rules; some limited exceptions apply. Players may hold more than one non-FIFA nationality.

No.	Pos.	Nation	Player
1	GK	URU	Gustavo Sebe
2	FW	URU	Facundo Cordero
3	MF	URU	Santiago Miranda
4	MF	URU	Matias Cabrera
5	DF	URU	Gaston Laduche
6	DF	URU	Agustin Quinta
7	MF	URU	Luis Quinta

No.	Pos.	Nation	Player
8	MF	URU	Gonzalo Cazet
9	FW	URU	Andres Laens
10	FW	URU	Marcelo Capurro
11	FW	URU	Nicolas Bella
12	GK	URU	Alejandro Guerrero
13	GK	URU	Felipe Fernandez
14	MF	URU	Richard Catardo

Head coach: German Parrillo
Assistant coach: Leandro Ortiz

== Competitive record ==
=== FIFA Beach Soccer World Cup ===
FIFA World Cup record										Qualification (CONMEBOL) record (Note: In 2005 and 2007 merged qualification tournament with CONCACAF)								
Year	Round	Pos	Pld	W	W+	L	GF	GA	GD	Round	Pos	Pld	W	W+	L	GF	GA	GD
(Brazil) 2005	Quarter-finals	5th	3	2	0	1	15	11	+4	Runners-up	2nd	5	4	0	1	22	11	+11
(Brazil) 2006	Runners-up	2nd	6	2	1	3	22	20	+2	Runners-up	2nd	7	1	3	3	23	32	–9
(Brazil) 2007	Third place	3rd	6	2	2	2	15	17	–2	Runners-up	2nd	3	2	0	1	11	7	+4
(France) 2008	Quarter-finals	7th	4	1	1	2	20	18	+2	Third place	3rd	4	2	0	2	16	18	–2
(United Arab Emirates) 2009	Fourth place	4th	6	3	0	3	26	31	+5	Runners-up	2nd	5	3	0	2	18	17	+1
(Italy) 2011	did not qualify									Group stage	5th	3	1	0	2	14	10	+4
(French Polynesia) 2013	did not qualify									Sixth place	6th	4	0	1	3	15	19	–4
(Portugal) 2015	did not qualify									Fifth place	5th	6	4	0	2	25	25	0
(The Bahamas) 2017	did not qualify									Eight place	8th	6	2	0	4	27	29	–2
(Paraguay) 2019	Quarter-finals	7th	4	2	0	2	11	12	–1	Runners-up	2nd	6	4	0	2	23	31	–8
(Russia) 2021	Quarter-finals	8th	4	2	0	2	13	24	–11	Runners-up	2nd	6	4	1	1	17	12	+5
(United Arab Emirates) 2023	did not qualify									Group stage	5th	5	3	0	2	19	21	−2
(Seychelles) 2025	to be determined									to be determined								
Total	0 titles	8/12	31	14	4	15	122	123	–1	0 titles	12/12	60	30	5	25	230	232	−2

== Coaching staff ==
=== Current coaching staff ===
- Manager: Fernando Rosa
- Technical Assistant: Pablo Sanguinetti
- Head Delegation: Kevork Kouyoumdjian

=== Manager history ===
- Fernando Rosa

== Honours ==
- FIFA Beach Soccer World Cup Best: Runners-up
  - 2006
- CONCACAF and CONMEBOL Beach Soccer Championship Best: Runners-up
  - 2005, 2007
- CONMEBOL Beach Soccer Championship Best: Runners-up
  - 2006, 2009
- Mundialito de Futebol de Praia Best: Third Place
  - 1999
- Copa Latina Best: Champions
  - 2011
