= 2025 Copa América of Beach Soccer =

Copa América de Fútbol Playa Chile 2025
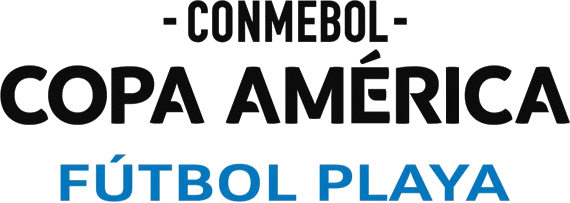

Tournament details
- Host country: Chile
- City: Iquique
- Dates: 22 February – 2 March
- Teams: 10 (from 1 confederation)
- Venue: Cavancha Beach

Final positions
- Champions: Brazil (4th title)
- Runners-up: Paraguay
- Third place: Chile
- Fourth place: Colombia

Tournament statistics
- Matches played: 27
- Goals scored: 218 (8.07 per match)
- Top scorer: (Brazil) Rodrigo (10 goals)

The 2025 Copa América of Beach Soccer (known natively in Spanish as the Copa América de Futbol Playa) was the fifth edition of the Copa América of Beach Soccer, the international beach soccer competition organised by CONMEBOL for the men's national teams of South America. It was held at Cavancha Beach in Iquique, Chile between 22 February and 2 March 2025.

For the second time, the tournament acted as the South American qualification for the FIFA Beach Soccer World Cup following CONMEBOL's decision to determine its representatives in the World Cup via the Copa America instead of its specific qualifying tournament that ran until 2021. The top three teams qualified for the 2025 FIFA Beach Soccer World Cup held in Seychelles. The defending champions were Brazil.

== Teams ==
Teams representing all 10 members of CONMEBOL participated.

Team	Appearance	Previous best performance
Argentina	5th	Runners-up (2023)
Bolivia	5th	Sixth place (2018)
Brazil (holders)	5th	Champions (2016, 2018, 2023)
Chile (hosts)	5th	Third place (2022)
Colombia	5th	Third place (2023)
Ecuador	5th	Fourth place (2018)
Paraguay	5th	Champions (2022)
Peru	5th	Fifth place (2016, 2022)
Uruguay	5th	Third place (2018)
Venezuela	5th	Third place (2016)

== Venue ==
Chile was named as host country on 11 November 2024. Iquique was confirmed as host city by the Football Federation of Chile on 6 January 2025, with Cavancha Beach, located in northern Chile on the coastline of the Pacific Ocean, as the venue for all the matches.

Iquique	2025 Copa América of Beach Soccer (Chile)
Cavancha Beach	2025 Copa América of Beach Soccer (Chile)
20.231745°S 70.147334°W	2025 Copa América of Beach Soccer (Chile)

== Squads ==
Each national team had to enter a squad of a maximum of 12 and a minimum of 10 players, including at least of two goalkeepers.

== Draw ==
The draw to split the ten teams into two groups of five took place at 12:00 PYST (UTC−3) on 11 November 2024 at CONMEBOL headquarters in Luque, Paraguay, under the following procedure:

The teams were seeded based on their final ranking in the previous edition of the tournament in 2023 (shown in brackets).

Initially, two teams were automatically assigned to position one of the groups:

- to Group A: as the hosts, Chile
- to Group B: as the last champions, Brazil

The remaining eight teams were split into four pots of two based on their seeding, in order from the highest seeds placed in Pot 1, down to the lowest seeds placed in Pot 4. From each pot, the first team drawn was placed into Group A and the second team drawn was placed into Group B.

Pot 1	Pot 2	Pot 3	Pot 4
Argentina (2); Colombia (3)	Paraguay (4); Uruguay (5)	Peru (7); Bolivia (8)	Ecuador (9); Venezuela (10)

== Match officials ==
On 23 January 2025, CONMEBOL announced a total of 22 referees appointed for the tournament.

- (Argentina) Mariano Romo
- (Argentina) Carlos Maidana
- (Bolivia) Jaimito Suárez
- (Bolivia) Luis Mojica
- (Brazil) Luciano Andrade
- (Brazil) Lucas Estevão
- (Chile) Cristian Galaz
- (Chile) Manuel Martin
- (Colombia) Jorge Iván Gómez
- (Colombia) Ferley Fuentes
- (Ecuador) Brandon Amay
- (Ecuador) Jean Villamar
- (Ecuador) Javier Marcillo
- (Peru) Micke Palomino
- (Peru) Alex Valdivieso
- (Paraguay) Diego Santander
- (Paraguay) Jorge Martínez
- (Paraguay) Silvio Coronel
- (Uruguay) Aecio Fernández
- (Uruguay) Lucas Hernández
- (Venezuela) Gerand Rivas
- (Venezuela) Darwin Busto

== Group stage ==
The top two teams of each group advanced to the semi-finals. The teams finishing in third through fifth proceeded to play in consolation matches against the teams finishing in the same position in the other group to determine their final rank.

Teams were awards three points for a win in regulation time, two points for a win in extra time, one point for a win in a penalty shoot-out, and no points for a loss.

Tiebreakers

If two or more teams are equal on points, their rankings are determined as follows:

1. points between the teams concerned;
2. goal difference between the teams concerned;
3. goals scored between the teams concerned;
4. goal difference in all group matches;
5. goals scored in all group matches;
6. fewest red cards;
7. fewest yellow cards;
8. drawing of lots by CONMEBOL.

All match times are in local time, CHI (UTC−3).

=== Group A ===
Pos	Team	Pld	W	WE	WP	L	GF	GA	GD	Pts	Qualification
1	Colombia	4	3	0	0	1	20	16	+4	9 (Note: Head-to-head: Chile 2–3 Colombia)	Semi-finals
2	Chile (H)	4	3	0	0	1	13	10	+3	9	Semi-finals
3	Uruguay	4	1	1	1	1	14	13	+1	6	Fifth place play-off
4	Bolivia	4	0	1	0	3	13	16	−3	2	Seventh place play-off
5	Ecuador	4	0	0	0	4	11	16	−5	0	Ninth place play-off

Source: Copa America
Rules for classification: Tiebreakers
(H) Host
Notes:
22 February 2025
16:15

Ecuador	2–3 (a.e.t.)	Uruguay
Lara 19', 34'	Report	Ortíz 10'; Maverino 16'; Laens 37'

Cavancha Beach
Referee: Micke Palomino (Peru)
22 February 2025
18:00

Chile	3–1	Bolivia
San Martín 9', 21'; Albuerno 11'	Report	Hurtado 9'

Cavancha Beach
Referee: Mariano Romo (Argentina)

23 February 2025
16:15

Bolivia	6–7	Colombia
Velasco 3'; Alpiri 6'; Zárate 11', 29'; Gutiérrez 17'; Ortiz 35'	Report	Hernández 4'; Clavijo 5', 17'; de Ávila 11'; Pantoja 14', 25'; Ossa 25'

Cavancha Beach
Referee: Luciano Andrade (Brazil)
23 February 2025
18:00

Ecuador	4–5	Chile
Moralez 4'; Lara 9', 27'; Naranjo 17'	Report	Durán 25'; San Martín 26', 28'; Bacian 33', 36'

Cavancha Beach
Referee: Alex Valdiviezo (Ecuador)

24 February 2025
16:15

Bolivia	3–2 (a.e.t.)	Ecuador
Zárate 14', 37'; Chávez 38'	Report	Yagual 18'; Lara 37'

Cavancha Beach
Referee: Carlos Maidana (Argentina)
24 February 2025
18:00

Colombia	5–5 (a.e.t.)	Uruguay
Hernández 13'; Ossa 21'; Clavijo 28'; Pantoja 32'; Donado 33'	Report	Miranda 3', 35'; Maverino 8'; Iturriaga 21'; Ortíz 35'
Penalties
Donado (penalty missed); Hernández (penalty scored); de Ávila (penalty scored); Clavijo (penalty missed); Ossa (penalty missed); Gómez (penalty missed)	2–3	(penalty missed) Miranda; (penalty scored) Laduche; (penalty scored) Quinta; (penalty missed) Maverino; (penalty missed) Laens; (penalty scored) Ortíz

Cavancha Beach
Referee: Mariano Romo (Argentina)

26 February 2025
16:15

Colombia	5–3	Ecuador
Hernández 2'; Clavijo 7'; de Ávila 13'; Pantoja 25'; Donado 31'	Report	Vélez 6'; Lara 14', 32'

Cavancha Beach
Referee: Lucas Estevao (Brazil)
26 February 2025
18:00

Uruguay	2–3	Chile
Ortíz 19'; Miranda 20'	Report	Tobar 6'; Durán 10'; Bacian 34'

Cavancha Beach
Referee: Carlos Maidana (Argentina)

27 February 2025
16:15

Uruguay	4–3	Bolivia
Iturriaga 5'; Ortíz 19'; Miranda 26'; Molina 34'	Report	Gutiérrez 6'; Claudio 12'; Zárate 28'

Cavancha Beach
Referee: Gerand Rivas (Venezuela)
27 February 2025
18:00

Chile	2–3	Colombia
Opazo 24'; Araya 25'	Report	Clavijo 3'; López 14', 26'

Cavancha Beach
Referee: Micke Palomino (Peru)

=== Group B ===
Pos	Team	Pld	W	WE	WP	L	GF	GA	GD	Pts	Qualification
1	Paraguay	4	3	0	0	1	16	14	+2	9 (Note: Head-to-head: Paraguay 5–3 Brazil)	Semi-finals
2	Brazil	4	3	0	0	1	30	14	+16	9	Semi-finals
3	Argentina	4	2	0	0	2	10	13	−3	6 (Note: Head-to-head: Argentina 3–2 Venezuela)	Fifth place play-off
4	Venezuela	4	2	0	0	2	17	23	−6	6	Seventh place play-off
5	Peru	4	0	0	0	4	13	22	−9	0	Ninth place play-off

Source: Copa America
Rules for classification: Tiebreakers
Notes:
22 February 2025
11:30

Venezuela	7–5	Paraguay
Escobar 2'; R. Pérez 8'; C. Pérez 8'; Semprún 10'; R. Ramos 34'; E. Ramos 35'; Vaamonde 36'	Report	N. Medina 4', 5'; Benítez 6'; Rivero 11' (o.g.); Martínez 26'

Cavancha Beach
Referee: Aecio Fernández (Uruguay)
22 February 2025
13:15

Brazil	9–4	Peru
Hulk 3', 36'; Mauricinho 11', 30'; Rodrigo 16'; Brendo 27', 32'; Benjamin Jr 31'; Bobô 34'	Report	Puelles 8', 36'; Díaz 31'; Mori 33'

Cavancha Beach
Referee: Cristian Galaz (Chile)

23 February 2025
11:30

Peru	3–4	Argentina
Díaz 5'; Manco 13'; Vargas 26'	Report	Medero 19'; Benaducci 25', 35'; Ponzetti 29'

Cavancha Beach
Referee: Jean Villamar (Ecuador)
23 February 2025
13:15

Venezuela	3–12	Brazil
E. Ramos 17'; Semprún 34'; Vaamonde 36'	Report	Bobô 7'; Neto 9'; Rodrigo 10', 10'; Brendo 13'; Datinha 15'; Mauricinho 16', 30'; Hulk 23', 29'; Benjamin Jr 25'; Alisson 32'

Cavancha Beach
Referee: Lucas Hernández (Uruguay)

24 February 2025
11:30

Peru	3–5	Venezuela
Velezmoro 19'; Sialer 20'; Escobar 24' (o.g.)	Report	Vaamonde 7', 16'; Rivera 14'; Betancourt 25'; C. Pérez 28'

Cavancha Beach
Referee: Aecio Fernández (Uruguay)
24 February 2025
13:15

Argentina	1–2	Paraguay
Gigena 9'	Report	Barrios 1'; Carballo 14'

Cavancha Beach
Referee: Jorge Iván Gómez (Colombia)

26 February 2025
11:30

Argentina	3–2	Venezuela
Ponzetti 5', 36'; Pomar 11'	Report	Vaamonde 25'; Pinto 28'

Cavancha Beach
Referee: Lucas Hernández (Uruguay)
26 February 2025
13:15

Paraguay	5–3	Brazil
Carballo 14'; Martínez 17'; N. Medina 20'; Benítez 25'; Morán 32'	Report	Rodrigo 10', 31'; Mauricinho 26'

Cavancha Beach
Referee: Brandon Amay (Ecuador)

27 February 2025
11:30

Paraguay	4–3	Peru
Barrios 1', 16'; Benítez 10', 14'	Report	Alcántara 2'; Díaz 11'; Velezmoro 13'

Cavancha Beach
Referee: Ferley Fuentes (Colombia)
27 February 2025
13:15

Brazil	6–2	Argentina
Rodrigo 1', 3', 8'; Thanger 4', 4'; Antônio 18'	Report	Cipolletta 4'; Ponzetti 8'

Cavancha Beach
Referee: Cristian Galaz (Chile)

== Final stages ==
All match times are in local time, CHI (UTC−3).

=== Bracket ===
Semi-finals
1 March
Colombia	4
Brazil	6
1 March
Paraguay	4
Chile	2

Final
2 March
Brazil	5
Paraguay	4
Third place play-off
2 March
Colombia	3
Chile	4

Ninth place play-off
1 March
Ecuador	3
Peru	10

Seventh place play-off
1 March
Bolivia	2
Venezuela	4

Fifth place play-off
2 March
Uruguay	4
Argentina	6

=== Semi-finals ===
1 March 2025
18:15

Colombia	4–6	Brazil
Pantoja 3'; Rodríguez 3'; López 6'; Gómez 20'	Report	Hulk 2', 8', 14'; Rodrigo 2', 22'; Datinha 34'

Cavancha Beach
Referee: Carlos Maidana (Argentina)
1 March 2025
20:00

Paraguay	4–2	Chile
Martínez 1', 13'; Benítez 24', 35'	Report	Durán 14'; San Martín 36'

Cavancha Beach
Referee: Jaimito Suárez (Bolivia)

=== Ninth place play-off ===
1 March 2025
13:30

Ecuador	3–10	Peru
Senge 19'; M. Cruz 20'; Lara 25'	Report	H. Lescano 3'; Manco 6', 35'; Mori 9'; Alcántara 13', 26', 31', 33'; Vidal 29'; Díaz 36'

Cavancha Beach
Referee: Diego Santander (Paraguay)

=== Seventh place play-off ===
1 March 2025
15:15

Bolivia	2–4	Venezuela
Ortiz 9'; Garzón 16'	Report	Vaamonde 13'; C. Pérez 14'; Semprún 16'; Garzón 32' (o.g.)

Cavancha Beach
Referee: Silvio Coronel (Paraguay)

=== Fifth place play-off ===
2 March 2025
15:45

Uruguay	4–6	Argentina
di Bello 11'; Gonzalez 23', 29'; Iturriaga 30'	Report	Benaducci 13'; Gigena 17'; Ponzetti 19', 25', 35'; Becares 30'

Cavancha Beach
Referee: Jorge Martínez (Paraguay)

=== Third place play-off ===
2 March 2025
17:30

Colombia	3–4	Chile
Clavijo 3'; Pantoja 16'; Albuerno 26' (o.g.)	Report	Bolívar 4'; Albuerno 14'; Tobar 20'; Bacian 29'

Cavancha Beach
Referee: Luciano Andrade (Brazil)

=== Final ===
2 March 2025
20:00

Brazil	5–4	Paraguay
Benjamin Jr 5', 19'; Bobô 9'; Thanger 12'; Antônio 16'	Report	Barrios 6'; M. Medina 9', 34'; Martínez 10'

Cavancha Beach
Referee: Mariano Romo (Argentina)

== Qualified teams for FIFA Beach Soccer World Cup ==
The following three teams from CONMEBOL qualified for the 2025 FIFA Beach Soccer World Cup in Seychelles.

Team	Qualified on	Previous appearances in FIFA Beach Soccer World Cup^{1} only FIFA era (since 2005)
Brazil	1 March 2025	12 (2005, **2006**, **2007**, **2008**, **2009**, 2011, 2013, 2015, **2017**, 2019, 2021, **2024**)
Paraguay	1 March 2025	5 (2013, 2015, 2017, 2019, 2021)
Chile	2 March 2025	0 (debut)

^{1} Bold indicates champions for that year. Italic indicates hosts for that year.

== Final ranking ==
Pos	Team	Pld	W	WE	WP	L	GF	GA	GD	Pts
1st place, gold medalist(s)	Brazil	6	5	0	0	1	41	22	+19	15
2nd place, silver medalist(s)	Paraguay	6	4	0	0	2	24	21	+3	12
3rd place, bronze medalist(s)	Chile (H)	6	4	0	0	2	19	17	+2	12
4	Colombia	6	3	0	0	3	27	26	+1	9
5	Argentina	5	3	0	0	2	16	17	−1	9
6	Uruguay	5	1	1	1	2	18	19	−1	6
7	Venezuela	5	3	0	0	2	21	25	−4	9
8	Bolivia	5	0	1	0	4	15	20	−5	2
9	Peru	5	1	0	0	4	23	25	−2	3
10	Ecuador	5	0	0	0	5	14	26	−12	0

Source: Copa America
(H) Host

== Broadcasting ==
The tournament's broadcasters by country are as follows:

- Argentina: DSports
- Bolivia: Tigo Sports
- Brazil: sportv / TV Globo
- Chile: TVN / DSports
- Colombia: Caracol TV / RCN / DSports
- Ecuador: DSports
- Paraguay: Tigo Sports
- Peru: DSports
- Uruguay: DSports
- Venezuela: Televen / DSports
- United States: TUDN / VIX

For all countries outside the Americas, the tournament is being streamed on YouTube.
