= 2023 Copa América of Beach Soccer =

Copa América de Fútbol Playa Argentina 2023
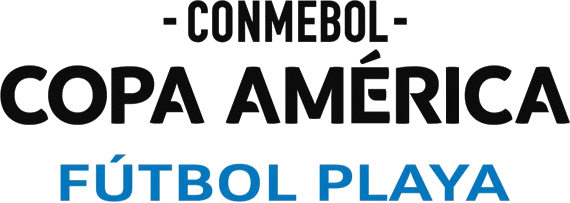

Tournament details
- Host country: Argentina
- Dates: 11–19 March
- Teams: 10 (from 1 confederation)
- Venue(s): 1 (in 1 host city)

Final positions
- Champions: Brazil (3rd title)
- Runners-up: Argentina
- Third place: Colombia
- Fourth place: Paraguay

Tournament statistics
- Matches played: 27
- Goals scored: 226 (8.37 per match)
- Top scorer(s): (Brazil) Edson Hulk (14 goals)

The 2023 Copa América of Beach Soccer (known natively in Spanish as the Copa América de Futbol Playa) was the fourth edition of the Copa América of Beach Soccer, the international beach soccer competition organised by CONMEBOL for the men's national teams of South America. It was held in Rosario, Argentina between 11 and 19 March 2023.

For the first time, the tournament acted as the South American qualification for the FIFA Beach Soccer World Cup following CONMEBOL's decision to determine its representatives in the World Cup via the Copa America instead of its specific qualifying tournament that ran until 2021. The top three teams qualified for the 2024 FIFA Beach Soccer World Cup held in the United Arab Emirates.

Brazil won their third Copa América Beach Soccer title by beating the hosts Argentina 13–5 in the final. The defending champions Paraguay was unable to retain their title after losing in the semi-finals to Brazil, leading them to play the third place match against Colombia, which they also lost by a 5–7 score. Champions Brazil, runners-up Argentina and third place Colombia qualified for the 2023 FIFA Beach Soccer World Cup.

== Teams ==
Teams representing all 10 members of CONMEBOL will take part.

Team	Appearance	Previous best performance
Argentina (hosts)	4th	Fifth place (2018)
Bolivia	4th	Sixth place (2018)
Brazil	4th	Champions (2016, 2018)
Chile	4th	Third place (2022)
Colombia	4th	Eighth place (2016, 2022)
Ecuador	4th	Fourth place (2018)
Paraguay (holders)	4th	Champions (2022)
Peru	4th	Fifth place (2016, 2022)
Uruguay	4th	Third place (2018)
Venezuela	4th	Third place (2016)

== Venue ==
Argentina was named as host country of the tournament at the CONMEBOL Council meeting held on 30 September 2022. Rosario was confirmed as host city by the Argentine Football Association on 14 February 2023, with the Estadio Arena, located within the Predio Ferial Parque Independencia, as the venue for all the matches.

Rosario	2023 Copa América of Beach Soccer (Argentina)
Predio Ferial; Parque de la Independencia	2023 Copa América of Beach Soccer (Argentina)
32.963504°S 60.660209°W	2023 Copa América of Beach Soccer (Argentina)

== Squads ==
Each national team had to enter a squad of a maximum of 12 and a minimum of 10 players, including at least of two goalkeepers (Regulations Article 47).

== Draw ==
The draw to split the ten teams into two groups of five took place at 12:00 PYST (UTC−3) on 16 February 2023 at CONMEBOL headquarters in Luque, Paraguay, under the following procedure:

The teams were seeded based on their final ranking in the previous edition of the tournament in 2022 (shown in brackets).

Initially, two teams were automatically assigned to position one of the groups:

- to Group A: as the hosts, Argentina
- to Group B: as the last champions, Paraguay

The remaining eight teams were split into four pots of two based on their seeding, in order from the highest seeds placed in Pot 1, down to the lowest seeds placed in Pot 4. From each pot, the first team drawn was placed into Group A and the second team drawn was placed into Group B.

Pot 1	Pot 2	Pot 3	Pot 4
Brazil (2); Chile (3)	Venezuela (4); Peru (5)	Uruguay (7); Colombia (8)	Ecuador (9); Bolivia (10)

The draw resulted in the following groups:

Group A
Pos	Team
A1	Argentina
A2	Brazil
A3	Peru
A4	Uruguay
A5	Ecuador

Group B
Pos	Team
B1	Paraguay
B2	Chile
B3	Venezuela
B4	Colombia
B5	Bolivia

== Match officials ==
On 23 February 2023, CONMEBOL announced a total of 20 referees appointed for the tournament.

- (Argentina) Mariano Romo
- (Argentina) Carlos Maidana
- (Argentina) Pablo Defelippi
- (Bolivia) Jaimito Suárez
- (Bolivia) Noe Parra
- (Brazil) Lucas Estevão
- (Brazil) Luciano Andrade
- (Brazil) Mayron Dos Reis
- (Chile) Cristian Galaz
- (Chile) Ricardo Zúñiga
- (Colombia) Jorge Iván Gómez
- (Colombia) Ferley Fuentes
- (Ecuador) Jean Villamar
- (Ecuador) Brandon Amay
- (Peru) Micke Palomino
- (Peru) Alex Valdivieso
- (Uruguay) Christian Altez
- (Uruguay) Aecio Fernández
- (Venezuela) Luis Coy
- (Venezuela) Gerand Rivas

== Group stage ==
The top two teams of each group advanced to the semi-finals. The teams finishing in third through fifth proceeded to play in consolation matches against the teams finishing in the same position in the other group to determine their final rank.

Each team earns three points for a win in regulation time, two points for a win in extra time, one point for a win in a penalty shoot-out, and no points for a defeat (Regulations Article 19).

If two or more teams are equal on points, their rankings are determined as follows (Regulations Article 20):

1. points obtained in the group matches between the teams concerned;
2. goal difference in the group matches between the teams concerned;
3. number of goals scored in the group matches between the teams concerned;
4. goal difference in all group matches;
5. number of goals scored in all group matches;
6. fewest red cards;
7. fewest yellow cards;
8. drawing of lots by CONMEBOL.

All match times are in local time, ART (UTC−3), as listed by CONMEBOL in the schedule published after the draw. 14 March is allocated as a rest day.

=== Group A ===
Pos	Team	Pld	W	W+	WP	L	GF	GA	GD	Pts	Qualification
1	Brazil	4	4	0	0	0	35	7	+28	12	Knockout stage
2	Argentina (H)	4	2	1	0	1	14	17	−3	8	Knockout stage
3	Uruguay	4	2	0	0	2	14	17	−3	6	Fifth place play-off
4	Peru	4	1	0	0	3	11	17	−6	3	Seventh place play-off
5	Ecuador	4	0	0	0	4	14	30	−16	0	Ninth place play-off

Source: CONMEBOL
(H) Host
11 March 2023
14:00

Ecuador	5–6	Peru
Daniel Cedeño (pen.) 1P, (pen.) 1P; José Rosales 1P; Luis Omar Carrera 2P; Jorge Ballón 2P	Report	1P Sócrates Vidal; 2P Manuel Millares; 2P, 3P, 3P Billyvardo Velezmoro; 3P Irwing Acuña

Estadio Arena
Referee: Pablo Defelippi (Argentina)
11 March 2023
17:00

Argentina	5–4	Uruguay
Lautaro Benaducci 1P; Naguel Gigena 2P; Emiliano Holmedilla 2P, 3P; Luciano Sirico 2P	Report	1P Ignacio Di Bello; 3P Santiago Miranda; 3P Gonzalo Cazet; 3P Luis Quinta

Estadio Arena
Referee: Micke Palomino (Peru)

12 March 2023
14:00

Uruguay	2–6	Brazil
2P, 3P Santiago Miranda	Report	1P Benjinha; 1P Mauricinho; 1P Ze Lucas; 1P, 3P Brendo; 2P Edson Hulk

Estadio Arena
Referee: Jorge Iván Gómez (Colombia)
12 March 2023
17:00

Ecuador	4–5 (a.e.t.)	Argentina
Jorge Ballón 1P, 3P, 3P; José Rosales 1P	Report	1P, (pen.) 2P Lucas Medero; Lautaro Benaducci 2P; Emiliano Holmedilla 2P; Carlos Nevarez (o.g.) ET

Estadio Arena
Referee: Mayron Dos Reis (Brazil)

13 March 2023
14:00

Uruguay	6–5	Ecuador
Santiago Miranda 1P, 1P, 2P, 3P; Gastón Laduche 2P; Gonzalo Cazet 3P	Report	1P, 3P Daniel Cedeño; 1P Oswaldo Farías; 2P Jorge Senge (pen.) 3P Carlos Nevarez

Estadio Arena
Referee: Jaimito Suárez (Bolivia)
13 March 2023
17:00

Brazil	8–3	Peru
Zé Lucas 1P, 3P; Benjinha 1P, 3P; Edson Hulk 1P, 2P; Diogo Catarino 2P, 2P	Report	1P Billyvardo Velezmoro; 2P Sócrates Vidal; 2P Diego Alcántara

Estadio Arena
Referee: Christian Altez (Uruguay)

15 March 2023
14:00

Brazil	13–0	Ecuador
Datinha 1P; Edson Hulk 1P, 2P, 2P, 3P; Diogo Catarino 1P; Mauricinho 2P, 3P; Brendo 2P; Filipe Silva 2P; Bobô 3P; Mão 3P; Jordan 3P	Report

Estadio Arena
Referee: Luis Coy (Venezuela)
15 March 2023
17:00

Peru	1–2	Argentina
Sócrates Vidal 2P	Report	2P Lucas Ponzetti; 3P Lucas Medero

Estadio Arena
Referee: Jorge Iván Gómez (Colombia)

16 March 2023
14:00

Peru	1–2	Uruguay
Enzo Delgado 1P'	Report	Richard Catardo 1P'; Luis Quinta 3P'

Estadio Arena
Referee: Luis Coy (Venezuela)
16 March 2023
17:00

Argentina	2–8	Brazil
Lautaro Benaducci 2P, 3P	Report	1P, 1P, 1P Edson Hulk; 1P Filipe Silva; 2P, 3P Mauricinho; 2P Benjinha; 3P Jordan Soares

Estadio Arena
Referee: Alex Valdiviezo (Peru)

=== Group B ===
Pos	Team	Pld	W	W+	WP	L	GF	GA	GD	Pts	Qualification
1	Colombia	4	3	0	0	1	14	9	+5	9 (Note: Head-to-head points: Colombia 3, Paraguay 0.)	Knockout stage
2	Paraguay	4	3	0	0	1	29	12	+17	9	Knockout stage
3	Chile	4	2	0	0	2	12	18	−6	6 (Note: Head-to-head points: Chile 3, Bolivia 0.)	Fifth place play-off
4	Bolivia	4	2	0	0	2	10	18	−8	6	Seventh place play-off
5	Venezuela	4	0	0	0	4	9	17	−8	0	Ninth place play-off

Source: CONMEBOL
Notes:
11 March 2023
12:30

Bolivia	4–2	Venezuela
Erick López 1'; Darlon Zárate 5'; Pablo Zapata 24'; Berthy Alpiri 26'	Report CONMEBOL; Report FVF	9' Hengelbert Prado; 21' Fausto Escobar

Estadio Arena
Referee: Luciano Andrade (Brazil)
11 March 2023
15:30

Paraguay	4–5	Colombia
Néstor Medina 20', 35'; Valentín Benítez 27'; Milcíades Medina 29'	Report CONMEBOL; Report APF	10' Wilson Córdoba; 16' Esleider de Ávila; 17' Rafael Acosta; 23' Victor Morales; 33' Juan Ossa

Estadio Arena
Referee: Christian Altez (Uruguay)

12 March 2023
12:30

Colombia	3–2	Chile
Victor Morales 2P; Juan Ossa 2P; Eduardo López 2P	Report	1P Alberto Echeverria; 3P Daniel Papic

Estadio Arena
Referee: Mario Romo (Argentina)
12 March 2023
15:30

Bolivia	1–10	Paraguay
Dudy Chávez 3P	Report CONMEBOL; Report APF	1', 9' Mathías Martínez; 3' Néstor Medina; 6', 19' Milciades Medina; 14', 34' Carlos Ovelar; 33', 34' Thiago Barrios; 35' Sixto Cantero

Estadio Arena
Referee: Lucas Estevão (Brazil)

13 March 2023
12:30

Colombia	2–3	Bolivia
Esleider de Ávila 1P; Victor Morales 3P	Report	2P Dárlon Zárate; 3P Berthy Alpiri; 3P Jhon Hurtado

Estadio Arena
Referee: Aecio Fernández (Uruguay)
13 March 2023
15:30

Chile	4–3	Venezuela
Daniel Papic 11'; Héctor Tobar 12', 28'; Benjamín Arce 26' (pen.)	Report CONMEBOL; Report FVF	2' Rosdel Ramos; 17' José Semprun; 35' Hengelbert Prado

Estadio Arena
Referee: Carlos Maidana (Argentina)

15 March 2023
12:30

Chile	4–2	Bolivia
Ariel Peso 1P; Pablo Rodríguez 2P; Héctor Tobar 3P; Diego San Martín 3P	Report	1P Berthy Alpiri; 2P Dahulon Zárate

Estadio Arena
Referee: Mario Romo (Argentina)
15 March 2023
15:30

Venezuela	4–5	Paraguay
Edgar Castellanos 1'; Fausto Escobar 11'; Enderson Ramos 27'; Wuinder Muñoz 34'	Report CONMEBOL; Report APF	11' Thiago Barrios; 11' Sixto Cantero; 15' Jhovanny Benítez; 17', 29' Milciades Medina

Estadio Arena
Referee: Alex Valdiviezo (Peru)

16 March 2023
12:30

Venezuela	0–4	Colombia
	Report CONMEBOL; Report FVF	8' Andrés Rueda; 16' Sebastián Hernández; 18' Eduardo López; 34' Wilson Córdoba

Estadio Arena
Referee: Micke Palomino (Peru)
16 March 2023
15:30

Paraguay	10–2	Chile
Yoao Rolón 10'; Jhovanny Benítez 13'; Milcíades Medina 14', 31'; Thiago Barrios 18'; Mathías Martínez 25'; Néstor Medina 26', 28', 35'; Valentín Benítez 30'	Report CONMEBOL; Report APF	31', 35' Andrés Albuerno

Estadio Arena
Referee: Carlos Maidana (Argentina)

== Final stages ==
All match times are in local time, ART (UTC−3), as listed by CONMEBOL.

=== Bracket ===
Semi-finals
18 March
Brazil	7
Paraguay	4
18 March
Colombia	0
Argentina	2

Final
19 March
Brazil	13
Argentina	5
Third place play-off
19 March
Paraguay	5
Colombia	7

Ninth place play-off
18 March
Ecuador	2
Venezuela	1

Seventh place play-off
18 March
Peru	6
Bolivia	3

Fifth place play-off
19 March
Uruguay	5
Chile	4

=== Semi-finals ===
18 March 2023
15:00

Brazil	7–4	Paraguay
Brendo 10'; Igor Melo 1P'; Benjinha 16', 26'; Zé Lucas 2P'; Jordan Soares 23', 29'	Report CONMEBOL; Report APF	Valentín Benítez 9', 22'; Mathías Martínez 17', 29'

Estadio Arena
Referee: Aecio Fernández (Uruguay)
18 March 2023
16:45

Colombia	0–2	Argentina
	Report	3P' Emiliano Holmedilla; 3P' Lucas Ponzetti

Estadio Arena
Referee: Christian Altez (Uruguay)

=== Ninth place play-off ===
18 March 2023
11:30

Ecuador	2–1	Venezuela
Daniel Cedeño 3'; Moisés Dender 16'	Report CONMEBOL; Report FVF	Renny García 21'

Estadio Arena
Referee: Mayron Dos Reis (Brazil)

=== Seventh place play-off ===
18 March 2023
13:15

Peru	6–3	Bolivia
Manuel Millares 1P'; Irwing Acuña 2P', 2P'; Diego Alcántara 2P', 3P'; Enzon Delgado 3P'	Report	1P' Dudy Chávez; 2P' Darlon Zárate; 3P' (pen.) Berthy Alpiri

Estadio Arena
Referee: Lucas Estevão (Brazil)

=== Fifth place play-off ===
19 March 2023
11:30

Uruguay	5–4	Chile
Ignacio di Bello 2P'; Andrés Laens 2P', 2P'; Gonzalo Cazet 3P'; Luis Quinta 3P'	Report	Héctor Tobar 1P', 2P', 2P', 3P'

Estadio Arena
Referee: Luciano Andrade (Brazil)

=== Third place play-off ===
19 March 2023
13:30

Paraguay	5–7	Colombia
Mathías Martínez 17', 20'; Sixto Cantero 27'; Jesús Rolón 33'; Valentín Benítez 35'	Report CONMEBOL; Report APF	5', 17' Juan Ossa; 17', 18' Wilson Córdoba; 21', 32' Rafael Acosta; 35' Kevin Clavijo

Estadio Arena
Referee: Mariano Romo (Argentina)

=== Final ===
19 March 2023
16:00

Brazil	13–5	Argentina
Zé Lucas 1'; Jordan Soares 1P', 3P'; Edson Hulk 1P', 3P', 3P', 3P'; Filipe Silva 1P', 1P'; Igor Melo 2P'; Brendo Chagas 3P'; Datinha 3P', 3P'	Report CONMEBOL; Report AFA	Lucas Ponzetti 2P'; Manuel Pomar 3P'; Mathías Rivadeneira 3P'; Lucas Medero 3P'; Emanuel De Sosa 3P'

Estadio Arena
Referee: Jorge Iván Gómez (Colombia)

== Qualified teams for FIFA Beach Soccer World Cup ==
The following three teams from CONMEBOL qualify for the 2023 FIFA Beach Soccer World Cup in the United Arab Emirates.

Team	Qualified on	Previous appearances in FIFA Beach Soccer World Cup^{1} only FIFA era (since 2005)
Brazil	18 March 2023	11 (2005, **2006**, **2007**, **2008**, **2009**, 2011, 2013, 2015, **2017**, 2019, 2021)
Argentina	18 March 2023	8 (2005, 2006, 2007, 2008, 2009, 2011, 2013, 2015)
Colombia	19 March 2023	0 (debut)

^{1} Bold indicates champions for that year. Italic indicates hosts for that year.

== Final ranking ==
Pos	Team	Pld	W	W+	WP	L	GF	GA	GD	Pts
1st place, gold medalist(s)	Brazil	6	6	0	0	0	55	16	+39	18
2nd place, silver medalist(s)	Argentina (H)	6	3	1	0	2	21	30	−9	11
3rd place, bronze medalist(s)	Colombia	6	4	0	0	2	21	16	+5	12
4	Paraguay	6	3	0	0	3	38	26	+12	9
5	Uruguay	5	3	0	0	2	19	21	−2	9
6	Chile	5	2	0	0	3	16	23	−7	6
7	Peru	5	2	0	0	3	17	20	−3	6
8	Bolivia	5	2	0	0	3	13	24	−11	6
9	Ecuador	5	1	0	0	4	16	31	−15	3
10	Venezuela	5	0	0	0	5	10	19	−9	0

Source: FIFA
(H) Host
