= 2013 South American Beach Soccer Championship =

2013 FIFA Beach Soccer World Cup CONMEBOL qualifier
2013 South American Beach Soccer Championship
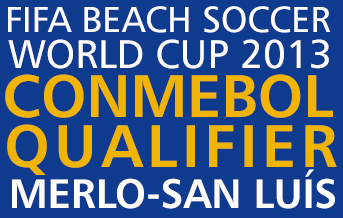

Tournament details
- Host country: Argentina
- Dates: 10–17 February
- Teams: 9 (from 1 confederation)
- Venue: 1 (in 1 host city)

Final positions
- Champions: Argentina (1st title)
- Runners-up: Paraguay
- Third place: Brazil
- Fourth place: Ecuador

Tournament statistics
- Matches played: 24
- Goals scored: 202 (8.42 per match)
- Top scorer: (Brazil) Bruno Xavier (13 goals)
- Best player: (Argentina) Luciano Franceschini
- Best goalkeeper: (Argentina) Marcelo Salgueiro

The 2013 FIFA Beach Soccer World Cup CONMEBOL qualifier, also commonly known as the 2013 South American Beach Soccer Championship, was the fifth Beach Soccer World Cup qualification championship for South America, held from February 10–17 at Parque Recreativo, in Merlo, a town in the San Luis Province of Argentina.

The qualifiers were not coordinated by CONMEBOL at the time. The event was organised by Beach Soccer Worldwide (BSWW), under the FIFA Beach Soccer World Cup Qualifier title. CONMEBOL first recognised the tournament this year, under the title South American Beach Soccer Championship, also acknowledging the 2006–11 events as historic editions of the championship. CONMEBOL eventually began organising the qualifiers in 2017, under a new title.

== Participating teams ==
The same nine nations who played in the 2011 qualifiers have entered into the tournament:

- Argentina
- Brazil
- Chile
- Colombia
- Ecuador
- Paraguay
- Peru
- Uruguay
- Venezuela

== Match officials ==
Here is the list of match officials for this tournament:

- (Uruguay) Cesar Figueredo (head official)
- (Argentina) Mario Jose Narciso Romo y Pablo Valentin Del Puerto Gudin
- (Brazil) Felipe Duarte Varejao
- (Chile) Patricio Alberto Blanca Fuentes
- (Ecuador) Jose Cortez Ortiz
- (Paraguay) Gustavo Alberto Dominguez
- (Peru) Micke Palomino Huamani
- (Uruguay) Javier Roberto Betancor Porteiro y Carlos Ismael Aguirregaray
- (Venezuela) Jose Miguel Misel Navarro

== Group stage ==
The draw to divide the nine teams into two groups (one will have five teams, the other will have four) was conducted on 8 January 2013. The subsequent schedule seen here is the official schedule, which was finally released on 9 February 2013.

All match times will be correct to that of local time in Merlo, being Argentina Time, (UTC-03:00).

=== Group A ===
Team	Pld	W	W+	L	GF	GA	+/-	Pts
Argentina	4	3	1	0	13	5	+8	11
Paraguay	4	2	0	2	16	12	+4	6
Chile	4	2	0	2	20	19	+1	6
Peru	4	1	0	3	8	13	-5	3
Colombia	4	1	0	3	10	18	-8	3

clinched Championship Playoff Stage berth

10 February 2013
13:00

Colombia	5 - 6	Chile
	Report

Parque Recreativo, Merlo
10 February 2013
14:15

Peru	1 - 2	Argentina
	Report

Parque Recreativo, Merlo

11 February 2013
14:15

Chile	5 - 2	Peru
	Report

Parque Recreativo, Merlo
11 February 2013
15:30

Colombia	3 - 2	Paraguay
	Report

Parque Recreativo, Merlo

12 February 2013
14:15

Paraguay	4 - 1	Peru
	Report

Parque Recreativo, Merlo
12 February 2013
16:45

Argentina	3 - 3 (a.e.t.)	Chile
	Report
Penalties
Penalty scored	1 - 0	Penalty missed

Parque Recreativo, Merlo

13 February 2013
14:15

Colombia	2 - 4	Peru
	Report

Parque Recreativo, Merlo
13 February 2013
16:45

Argentina	2 - 1	Paraguay
	Report

Parque Recreativo, Merlo

14 February 2013
15:30

Paraguay	9 - 6	Chile
	Report

Parque Recreativo, Merlo
14 February 2013
16:45

Argentina	6 - 0	Colombia
	Report

Parque Recreativo, Merlo

=== Group B ===
Team	Pld	W	W+	L	GF	GA	+/-	Pts
Brazil	3	3	0	0	24	12	+12	9
Ecuador	3	2	0	1	13	13	0	6
Uruguay	3	0	1	2	9	13	-4	2
Venezuela	3	0	0	3	11	19	-8	0

clinched Championship Playoff Stage berth

11 February 2013
13:00

Venezuela	2 - 3 (a.e.t.)	Uruguay
	Report

Parque Recreativo, Merlo
11 February 2013
16:45

Ecuador	4 - 6	Brazil
	Report

Parque Recreativo, Merlo

12 February 2013
13:00

Venezuela	4 - 5	Ecuador
	Report

Parque Recreativo, Merlo
12 February 2013
15:30

Brazil	7 - 3	Uruguay
	Report

Parque Recreativo, Merlo

13 February 2013
13:00

Uruguay	3 - 4	Ecuador
	Report

Parque Recreativo, Merlo
13 February 2013
15:30

Brazil	11 - 5	Venezuela
	Report

Parque Recreativo, Merlo

== Playoff Stage ==
=== Seventh place playoff ===
Since there are nine teams in the tournament, it was decided that a group stage-like playoff to determine the bottom three placements would be held. This group would involve the 4th and 5th-place finishers in Group A and the 4th-place finisher in Group B.

Team	Pld	W	W+	L	GF	GA	+/-	Pts
Colombia	2	2	0	0	9	6	+3	6
Peru	2	1	0	1	7	7	0	3
Venezuela	2	0	0	2	6	9	-3	0

15 February 2013
11:00

Peru	4 - 3	Venezuela
	Report

Parque Recreativo, Merlo

16 February 2013
15:30

Venezuela	3 - 5	Colombia
	Report

Parque Recreativo, Merlo

17 February 2013
10:30

Colombia	4 - 3	Peru
	Report

Parque Recreativo, Merlo

=== Fifth place playoff ===
16 February 2013
11:15

Chile	6 - 6 (a.e.t.)	Uruguay
	Report
Penalties
Penalty scored	2 - 1	Penalty scored Penalty missed

Parque Recreativo, Merlo

=== Championship playoff ===
Semi-finals
16 February - Merlo
Brazil	6 (0)
Paraguay (a.e.t.)	6 (1)
16 February - Merlo
Argentina	5
Ecuador	3

Final
17 February - Merlo
Paraguay	2
Argentina	6
Third place
17 February - Merlo
Brazil	11
Ecuador	5

==== Semifinals ====
16 February 2013
13:00

Brazil	6 - 6 (a.e.t.)	Paraguay
	Report
Penalties
Penalty missed	0 - 1	Penalty scored

Parque Recreativo, Merlo

16 February 2013
14:15

Argentina	5 - 3	Ecuador
	Report

Parque Recreativo, Merlo

==== Third place playoff ====
17 February 2013
13:00

Brazil	11 - 5	Ecuador
	Report

Parque Recreativo, Merlo

==== Final ====
17 February 2013
14:15

Paraguay	2 - 6	Argentina
	Report

Parque Recreativo, Merlo

== Winners ==
(2013) FIFA Beach Soccer World Cup
Qualification (CONMEBOL) Winners:

Argentina
First title

== Awards ==
Best Player (MVP)
(Argentina) Luciano Franceschini
Top Scorer
(Brazil) Bruno Xavier
13 goals
Best Goalkeeper
(Argentina) Marcelo Salgueiro
FIFA Fair Play Award
Peru

== Teams Qualifying ==
	Team
1st Place	Argentina
2nd Place	Paraguay
3rd Place	Brazil

== Final Placement ==
Rank	Team
1	Argentina
2	Paraguay
3	Brazil
4	Ecuador
5	Chile
6	Uruguay
7	Colombia
8	Peru
9	Venezuela
