= 2022 Copa América of Beach Soccer =

Copa América de Fútbol Playa Paraguay 2022
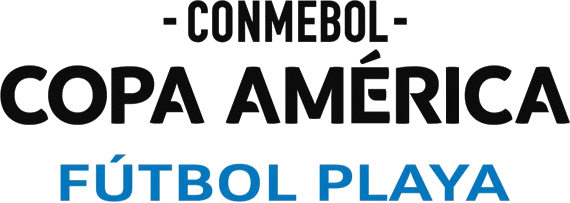

Tournament details
- Host country: Paraguay
- Dates: 21–29 May
- Teams: 10 (from 1 confederation)
- Venue(s): 1 (in 1 host city)

Final positions
- Champions: Paraguay (1st title)
- Runners-up: Brazil
- Third place: Chile
- Fourth place: Venezuela

Tournament statistics
- Matches played: 27
- Goals scored: 186 (6.89 per match)

The 2022 Copa América of Beach Soccer (known natively in Spanish as the Copa América de Futbol Playa) was the third edition of the Copa América of Beach Soccer, an international beach soccer competition in South America, contested between the men's national teams of the members of CONMEBOL.

The competition was organised by South American football's governing body, CONMEBOL; other beach soccer events under the "Copa América" title took place during 1994–99, 2003 and 2012–14, however this incarnation is the first to be officially organised and sanctioned by CONMEBOL.

The tournament was hosted by Paraguay in Luque (Asunción), between 21 and 29 May. The tournament returned for the first time in four years after the last scheduled edition in 2020 was cancelled due to the effects of the COVID-19 pandemic in South America.

Brazil were the two-time defending champions, but lost in the final to hosts Paraguay who won their first ever title, and claimed the first CONMEBOL competition victory by any senior Paraguayan team since the 1979 Copa América.

== Teams ==
Teams representing all 10 members of CONMEBOL took part.

- Argentina
- Bolivia
- Brazil
- Chile
- Colombia
- Ecuador
- Paraguay
- Peru
- Venezuela
- Uruguay

== Venue ==
One venue was used in the city of Luque, part of the Greater Asunción area, on the grounds of the Paraguayan Olympic Committee headquarters.

Luque (Asunción area)	2022 Copa América of Beach Soccer (Paraguay)
Los Pynandi Stadium	2022 Copa América of Beach Soccer (Paraguay)
25°15′23.7″S 57°31′54.11″W	2022 Copa América of Beach Soccer (Paraguay)
Capacity: 2,820	2022 Copa América of Beach Soccer (Paraguay)

== Squads ==
Each team had to submit a squad of no less than 10 and no more than 12 players, including a minimum of two goalkeepers (Regulations Article 28). In consideration of the ongoing COVID-19 pandemic, any of these registered players who become afflicted by the disease could be freely replaced before the tournament began (Regulations Article 33).

== Draw ==
The draw to split the ten teams into two groups of five took place at 12:00 PYT (UTC−4) on 4 May at CONMEBOL headquarters in Luque, Paraguay, under the following procedure:

The teams were seeded based on their final ranking in the previous edition of the tournament in 2018.

Initially, two teams were automatically assigned to position one of the groups:

- to Group A: as the hosts, Paraguay
- to Group B: as the top seeds, Brazil

The remaining eight teams were split into four pots of two based on their seeding, in order from the highest seeds placed in Pot 1, down to the lowest seeds placed in Pot 4. From each pot, the first team drawn was placed into Group A and the second team drawn was placed into Group B.

Pot 1	Pot 2	Pot 3	Pot 4
Uruguay; Ecuador	Argentina; Bolivia	Peru; Chile	Colombia; Venezuela

The draw resulted in the following groups:

Group A
Pos	Team
A1	Paraguay
A2	Ecuador
A3	Argentina
A4	Chile
A5	Colombia

Group B
Pos	Team
B1	Brazil
B2	Uruguay
B3	Bolivia
B4	Peru
B5	Venezuela

== Group stage ==
The top two teams of each group advanced to the semi-finals. The teams finishing in third through fifth proceeded to play in consolation matches against the teams finishing in the same position in the other group to determine their final rank.

Each team earns three points for a win in regulation time, two points for a win in extra time, one point for a win in a penalty shoot-out, and no points for a defeat (Regulations Article 19).

If two or more teams are equal on points, their rankings are determined as follows (Regulations Article 20):

1. points obtained in the group matches between the teams concerned;
2. goal difference in the group matches between the teams concerned;
3. number of goals scored in the group matches between the teams concerned;
4. goal difference in all group matches;
5. number of goals scored in all group matches;
6. fewest red cards;
7. fewest yellow cards;
8. drawing of lots by CONMEBOL.

Matches are listed as local time in Luque, PYT (UTC−4).

The schedule was published after the draw. 24 May is allocated as a rest day.

=== Group A ===
Pos	Team	Pld	W	W+	WP	L	GF	GA	GD	Pts	Qualification
1	Paraguay (H)	4	4	0	0	0	19	10	+9	12	Knockout stage
2	Chile	4	2	0	0	2	15	14	+1	6	Knockout stage
3	Argentina	4	1	0	0	3	14	12	+2	3	Fifth place play-off
4	Colombia	4	0	0	2	2	10	19	−9	2	Seventh place play-off
5	Ecuador	4	0	0	1	3	15	18	−3	1	Ninth place play-off

Source: CONMEBOL
(H) Host
21 May 2022
14:00

Colombia	2–2 (a.e.t.)	Argentina
	Report
Penalties
	4–1

Los Pynandi World Cup Stadium
21 May 2022
17:00

Paraguay	2–1	Chile
	Report

Los Pynandi World Cup Stadium

22 May 2022
14:00

Chile	6–5	Ecuador
	Report

Los Pynandi World Cup Stadium
22 May 2022
17:00

Colombia	2–7	Paraguay
	Report

Los Pynandi World Cup Stadium

23 May 2022
14:00

Chile	6–2	Colombia
	Report

Los Pynandi World Cup Stadium
23 May 2022
17:00

Ecuador	3–3 (a.e.t.)	Argentina
	Report
Penalties
	4–3

Los Pynandi World Cup Stadium

25 May 2022
14:00

Ecuador	4–4 (a.e.t.)	Colombia
	Report
Penalties
	1–3

Los Pynandi World Cup Stadium
25 May 2022
17:00

Argentina	4–5	Paraguay
	Report

Los Pynandi World Cup Stadium

26 May 2022
14:00

Argentina	5–2	Chile
	Report

Los Pynandi World Cup Stadium
26 May 2022
17:00

Paraguay	5–3	Ecuador
	Report

Los Pynandi World Cup Stadium

=== Group B ===
Pos	Team	Pld	W	W+	WP	L	GF	GA	GD	Pts	Qualification
1	Brazil	4	4	0	0	0	25	10	+15	12	Knockout stage
2	Venezuela	4	3	0	0	1	13	12	+1	9	Knockout stage
3	Peru	4	2	0	0	2	14	12	+2	6	Fifth place play-off
4	Uruguay	4	1	0	0	3	14	16	−2	3	Seventh place play-off
5	Bolivia	4	0	0	0	4	7	23	−16	0	Ninth place play-off

Source: CONMEBOL
21 May 2022
12:30

Venezuela	4–2	Bolivia
	Report

Los Pynandi World Cup Stadium
21 May 2022
15:30

Brazil	5–3	Peru
	Report

Los Pynandi World Cup Stadium

22 May 2022
12:30

Peru	4–2	Uruguay
	Report

Los Pynandi World Cup Stadium
22 May 2022
15:30

Venezuela	2–5	Brazil
	Report

Los Pynandi World Cup Stadium

23 May 2022
12:30

Peru	2–3	Venezuela
	Report

Los Pynandi World Cup Stadium
23 May 2022
15:30

Uruguay	5–2	Bolivia
	Report

Los Pynandi World Cup Stadium

25 May 2022
12:30

Uruguay	3–4	Venezuela
	Report

Los Pynandi World Cup Stadium
25 May 2022
15:30

Bolivia	1–9	Brazil
	Report

Los Pynandi World Cup Stadium

26 May 2022
12:30

Bolivia	2–5	Peru
	Report

Los Pynandi World Cup Stadium
26 May 2022
15:30

Brazil	6–4	Uruguay
	Report

Los Pynandi World Cup Stadium

== Placement matches ==
27 May is allocated as a rest day.

=== Ninth place play-off ===
28 May 2022

Ecuador	4–3	Bolivia
Bailon; Delgado; Cedeño; Carrera	Report	Aguilera; D. Chávez; Gutiérrez

Los Pynandi World Cup Stadium
Referee: César Cabrera (Paraguay)

=== Seventh place play-off ===
28 May 2022

Colombia	2–4	Uruguay
Ossa; Orejuela	Report	Quinta; Rosa; Bella

Los Pynandi World Cup Stadium
Referee: Ramón Blanco (Peru)

=== Fifth place play-off ===
29 May 2022

Argentina	1–4	Peru
Ponzetti	Report	Alcántara; Velezmoro

Los Pynandi World Cup Stadium
Referee: Silvio Coronel (Paraguay)

== Knockout stage ==
27 May is allocated as a rest day.

Semi-finals
28 May
Paraguay	6
Venezuela	1
28 May
Brazil	4
Chile	1

Final
29 May
Paraguay	3
Brazil	2
Third place play-off
29 May
Chile	3
Venezuela	2

=== Semi-finals ===
28 May 2022
15:30

Brazil	4–1	Chile
Igor; Fabrício	Report	Prieto

Los Pynandi World Cup Stadium
Referee: Carlos Maidana (Argentina)
28 May 2022
17:00

Paraguay	6–1	Venezuela
Carballo; C. Benítez; N. Medina; M. Medina; Ojeda	Report	Escobar

Los Pynandi World Cup Stadium
Referee: José Romo (Argentina)

=== Third place play-off ===
29 May 2022
15:30

Chile	3–2	Venezuela
San Martín; Héctor; Albuerno	Report	Gaona

Los Pynandi World Cup Stadium
Referee: Luciano Andrade (Brazil)

=== Final ===
29 May 2022
17:00

Paraguay	3–2	Brazil
Carballo; M. Medina	Report	Igor; Lucas

Los Pynandi World Cup Stadium
Referee: Micke Palomino (Peru)

== Winners ==
2022 Copa América of Beach Soccer
champions

Paraguay
First title

== Final standings ==
Rank	Team	Result
1	Paraguay	Champions
2	Brazil	Runners-up
3	Chile	Third place
4	Venezuela	Fourth place
5	Peru	Fifth place
6	Argentina	Sixth place
7	Uruguay	Seventh place
8	Colombia	Eighth place
9	Ecuador	Ninth place
10	Bolivia	Tenth place
