= Copa América of Beach Soccer =

South American beach soccer tournament

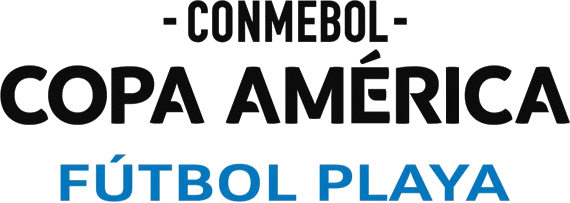
- Organiser(s): CONMEBOL
- Founded: 2016; 10 years ago
- Region: South America (CONMEBOL)
- Teams: 10
- Current champions: Brazil (4th title)
- Most championships: Brazil (4 titles)
- Website: conmebol.com
- 2025 Copa América of Beach Soccer

The Copa América of Beach Soccer (named natively in Spanish as the Copa América de Fútbol Playa) is a biennial international beach soccer tournament contested between the senior men's national teams of the 10 members of CONMEBOL. It is beach soccer's version of the better known Copa América in its parent sport, association football.

The tournament is organized by the governing body for football in South America, CONMEBOL, who established the event in 2016 following their declaration of commitment a year prior, to develop beach soccer on the continent. Exhibition-style events also held under the Copa América title took place in 1994–99, 2003 and 2012–14, but this fully competitive incarnation of the Copa América is the first to be officially sanctioned and organized by CONMEBOL, who also organize the other official Copa América events in association football and futsal.

Since 2023, it has been the main beach soccer championship disputed exclusively by South American national teams. It was previously one of two main championships along with the longer running World Cup qualification tournament, established in 2006. However, CONMEBOL announced the abolishment of the latter in 2022, in favour of having the Copa América double-up as its qualifiers for the World Cup instead. At this time, the tournament was also switched from taking place in even years to odd years.

== Results ==
Year	Location	Final			Third Place Play-off		
Year	Location	Winners	Score	Runners-up	Third Place	Score	Fourth Place
2016 details	Santos, Brazil	Brazil	12–2	Paraguay	Venezuela	7–6	Uruguay
2018 details	Asia District, Peru	Brazil	7–3	Paraguay	Uruguay	7–4	Ecuador
2020	Rio de Janeiro, Brazil	Originally scheduled for 10–17 May. Initially postponed and subsequently cancelled due to the COVID-19 pandemic.					
2022 details	Luque, Paraguay	Paraguay	3–2	Brazil	Chile	3–2	Venezuela
2023 details	Rosario, Argentina	Brazil	13–5	Argentina	Colombia	7–5	Paraguay
2025 details	Iquique, Chile	Brazil	5–4	Paraguay	Chile	4–3	Colombia

== Performance ==
=== Successful nations ===
As of 2025

Team	Titles	Runners-up	Third Place	Fourth Place	Total top 4
Brazil	4 (2016, 2018, 2023, 2025)	1 (2022)	–	–	5
Paraguay	1 (2022)	3 (2016, 2018, 2025)	–	1 (2023)	5
Argentina	–	1 (2023)	–	–	1
Chile	–	–	2 (2022, 2025)	–	2
Colombia	–	–	1 (2023)	1 (2025)	2
Uruguay	–	–	1 (2018)	1 (2016)	2
Venezuela	–	–	1 (2016)	1 (2022)	2
Ecuador	–	–	–	1 (2018)	1

=== All-time top goalscorers ===
As of 2025

The following table shows the all-time top 15 goalscorers.

Rank	Player	Team	Goals
1	Daniel Cedeño	Ecuador	27
2	Billy Velezmoro	Peru	26
2	Rodrigo	Brazil	26
4	Jorge Bailon	Ecuador	24
5	Edson Hulk	Brazil	21
6	Alejander Vaamonde	Venezuela	20
6	Carlos Valentín Benítez	Paraguay	20
8	Mauricinho	Brazil	18
9	Carlos Carballo	Paraguay	17
9	Lautaro Benaducci	Argentina	17
11	Pedro Moran	Paraguay	15
11	Néstor Medina	Paraguay	15
13	Datinha	Brazil	14
13	Milciades Medina	Paraguay	14
15	Filipe da Silva	Brazil	13
15	Lucas Medero	Argentina	13
15	Sócrates Vidal	Peru	13

Sources: 2016, 2018; Match reports: 2022, 2023, 2025.

=== Overall standings ===
As of 2025

Pos	Team	App	Pld	W	W+	WP	L	GF	GA	GD	Pts	PPG	Win %
1	Brazil	5	29	27	0	0	2	218	76	+142	81	2.79	93.1%
2	Paraguay	5	29	18	0	1	10	152	118	+34	55	1.90	65.5%
3	Uruguay	5	26	11	1	3	11	101	107	–6	38	1.46	57.7%
4	Argentina	5	26	11	1	0	14	87	116	–29	35	1.35	46.2%
5	Chile	5	27	11	0	0	16	88	118	–30	33	1.22	40.7%
6	Peru	5	25	10	0	1	14	105	103	+2	31	1.24	44.0%
7	Colombia	5	27	9	0	3	15	94	110	–16	30	1.11	44.4%
8	Venezuela	5	26	10	0	0	16	87	115	–28	30	1.15	38.5%
9	Ecuador	5	26	5	1	3	17	108	132	–24	20	0.77	34.6%
10	Bolivia	5	25	5	2	0	18	82	127	–45	19	0.76	28.0%

Key: Appearances App / Won in Normal Time W = 3 Points / Won in Extra Time W+ = 2 Points / Won in Penalty shoot-out WP = 1 Point / Lost L = 0 Points / Points per game PPG

=== Appearances & performance timeline ===
Key

- 1st – Champions
- 2nd – Runners-up
- 3rd – Third place
- 4th – Fourth place
- 5th–10th — Fifth to tenth place
- – Hosts
- Apps — Total appearances

Year Team	2016 (Brazil) (10)	2018 (Peru) (10)	2022 (Paraguay) (10)	2023 (Argentina) (10)	2025 (Chile) (10)	Apps /5
Argentina	10th	5th	6th	2nd	5th	5
Bolivia	7th	6th	10th	8th	8th	5
Brazil	1st	1st	2nd	1st	1st	5
Chile	6th	8th	3rd	6th	3rd	5
Colombia	8th	9th	8th	3rd	4th	5
Ecuador	9th	4th	9th	9th	10th	5
Paraguay	2nd	2nd	1st	4th	2nd	5
Peru	5th	7th	5th	7th	9th	5
Uruguay	4th	3rd	7th	5th	6th	5
Venezuela	3rd	10th	4th	10th	7th	5

== See also ==
- Copa América de Futsal
