= Peru national beach soccer team =

Peru
- Nickname(s): La Bicolor (The Bicolour); La Blanquirroja (The White and Red)
- Association: Federación Peruana de Fútbol
- Confederation: CONMEBOL (South America)
- Head coach: Francisco Castelo
- Captain: Billy Velezmoro
- FIFA code: PER
- BSWW ranking: 42 ▼2 (19 January 2026)
First colours
Second colours

First international
- Peru 5–4 Argentina (Rio de Janeiro, Brazil; 18 January 1998)

Biggest defeat
- Brazil 18-2 Peru (Vitória, Brazil; 10 December 1999)

Copa América of Beach Soccer
- Appearances: 5 (first in 2016)
- Best result: Fifth place (2016, 2022)

The Peru national beach soccer team represents Peru in international beach soccer competitions and is controlled by the FPF, the governing body for football in Peru.

== Current squad ==
Correct as of March 2018

Note: Flags indicate national team as defined under FIFA eligibility rules; some limited exceptions apply. Players may hold more than one non-FIFA nationality.

No.	Pos.	Nation	Player
1	GK	PER	Ignacio Drago
2	MF	PER	Oswaldo Rivas
3	MF	PER	Rodolfo Maurtua
4	DF	PER	Yomar Pérez
6	MF	PER	Andy Moscoso
7	MF	PER	Sócrates Moscoso

No.	Pos.	Nation	Player
8		PER	Juan Paulino Burga
9		PER	Alex Valera
10	FW	PER	Juan Cominges
11	FW	PER	Billyvardo Velezmoro
12	GK	PER	Carlos Torres
—		PER	Luiggi Muchotrigo

Coach: Franciso Castelo

== Records ==
=== Achievements ===
- Beach Soccer World Championships Best: Runners-up
  - 2000
- Mundialito de Futebol de Praia Best: Runners-up
  - 1998

=== Beach Soccer World Championships (no FIFA) ===
World Championships record
Year	Round	Pos	Pld	W	W+	L	GF	GA	GD
(Brazil) 1995	Did not enter								
(Brazil) 1996	Did not enter								
(Brazil) 1997	Did not enter								
(Brazil) 1998	Fourth place	4th	6	3	0	3	29	34	-5
(Brazil) 1999	Fourth place	4th	5	3	1	1	17	12	+5
(Brazil) 2000	Runners-up	2nd	5	4	0	1	23	12	+9
(Brazil) 2001	Seventh place	7th	3	1	0	2	9	16	-7
(Brazil) 2002	Did not enter								
(Brazil) 2003	Did not enter								
(Brazil) 2004	Group stage	9th	2	0	0	2	5	10	-5
Total	Runners-up	5/10	50	48	0	2			

=== FIFA Beach Soccer World Cup ===
FIFA World Cup record
Year	Round	Pos	Pld	W	W+	L	GF	GA	GD
(Brazil) 2005	Did not qualify								
(Brazil) 2006	Did not qualify								
(Brazil) 2007	Did not enter								
(France) 2008	Did not qualify								
(United Arab Emirates) 2009	Did not qualify								
(Italy) 2011	Did not qualify								
(French Polynesia) 2013	Did not qualify								
(Portugal) 2015	Did not qualify								
(The Bahamas) 2017	Did not qualify								
(Paraguay) 2019	Did not qualify								
(Russia) 2021	Did not qualify								
(United Arab Emirates) 2024	Did not qualify								
(Seychelles) 2025	Did not qualify								
Total	6 titles	12/13	65	53	5	7	405	196	+209

=== Copa América of Beach Soccer ===
Copa América of Beach Soccer record
Year	Result	Pld	W	W+	L	GF	GA	GD
(Brazil) 2016	Fifth place	5	3	0	2	20	19	+1
(Peru) 2018	Seventh place	5	1	0	2	27	26	+1
(Paraguay) 2022	Fifth place	5	3	0	2	18	13	+5
(Argentina) 2023	Seventh place	5	2	0	3	17	20	-3
(Chile) 2025	Ninth place	5	1	0	4	23	25	-2
Total	5/5	25	10	0	13	105	93	+12
