= 2018 Copa América of Beach Soccer =

Copa América de Fútbol Playa Peru 2018

Tournament details
- Host country: Peru
- Dates: 3–10 March
- Teams: 10 (from 1 confederation)
- Venue: 1 (in 1 host city)

Final positions
- Champions: Brazil (2nd title)
- Runners-up: Paraguay
- Third place: Uruguay
- Fourth place: Ecuador

Tournament statistics
- Matches played: 27
- Goals scored: 271 (10.04 per match)
- Top scorer(s): (Peru) Billivardo Velezmoro (Ecuador) Daniel Cedeño (15 goals)
- Best player: (Brazil) Rodrigo
- Best goalkeeper: (Paraguay) Rolando González

The 2018 Copa América of Beach Soccer (known natively in Spanish as the Copa América de Futbol Playa) was the second edition of the Copa América of Beach Soccer, an international beach soccer competition in South America, contested between the men's national teams of the members of CONMEBOL.

The competition was organised by South American football's governing body, CONMEBOL; other beach soccer events under the "Copa América" title took place during 1994–99, 2003 and 2012–14, however this incarnation is the first to be officially organised and sanctioned by CONMEBOL.

The tournament was hosted by Peru in the Asia District, around 100 km south of the capital, Lima, between 3 and 10 March. The event was held in cooperation with the local organisers, the Peruvian Football Federation (FPF).

The matches were watched by over 3.5 million people through the FPF's use of Facebook Live to transmit the games worldwide, to the delight of CONMEBOL who claimed the figures demonstrated beach soccer's continued growth under its investment.

Brazil were the defending champions and successfully reclaimed the title, beating Paraguay in the final in what was a repeat of the concluding match in the last edition.

== Teams ==
Teams representing all 10 members of CONMEBOL took part.

- Argentina
- Bolivia
- Brazil
- Chile
- Colombia
- Ecuador
- Paraguay
- Peru
- Venezuela
- Uruguay

== Venue ==
Location of Boulevard de Asia in Peru

One venue was used in the Asia District, Cañete Province.

- A purpose built arena was erected at the Sports Centre of the tourist location, El Boulevard de Asia, hosting all matches, with a capacity of 1,000.

== Squads ==
Each team had to submit a squad of 12 players, including a minimum of two goalkeepers (Regulations Article 4.1).

== Draw ==
The draw to split the ten teams into two groups of five took place on February 15 in the Asia District of Peru at the Centro Deportivo del Boulevard Asia, (Sports Centre of Boulevard Asia).

The teams were seeded based on their final ranking in the previous edition of the Copa América of Beach Soccer in 2016.

Initially, two teams were automatically assigned to the groups:

- to Group A: as the hosts, Peru
- to Group B: as the top seeds, Brazil

The remaining eight teams were split into four pots of two based on their seeding, in order from the highest seeds placed in Pot 1, down to the lowest seeds placed in Pot 4. From each pot, one team was drawn into Group A and the other team was drawn into Group B.

| Pot 1 | Pot 2 | Pot 3 | Pot 4 |
|---|---|---|---|
| Paraguay; Venezuela | Uruguay; Chile | Bolivia; Colombia | Ecuador; Argentina |

== Group stage ==
The top two teams of each group advanced to the semi-finals. The teams finishing in third through fifth proceeded to play in consolation matches against the teams finishing in the same position in the other group to determine their final rank.

Each team earns three points for a win in regulation time, two points for a win in extra time, one point for a win in a penalty shoot-out, and no points for a defeat. The rankings of teams in each group are determined as follows (Regulations Article 6.2):

1. points obtained in all group matches;

If two or more teams are equal on the basis of the above criterion, their rankings are determined as follows:

2. points obtained in the group matches between the teams concerned;
3. goal difference in the group matches between the teams concerned;
4. number of goals scored in the group matches between the teams concerned;
5. goal difference in all group matches;
6. number of goals scored in all group matches;
7. fewest red cards;
8. fewest yellow cards;
9. drawing of lots by CONMEBOL.

Matches are listed as local time in Lima, PET (UTC-5).

=== Group A ===
| Pos | Team | Pld | W | W+ | WP | L | GF | GA | GD | Pts | Qualification |
|---|---|---|---|---|---|---|---|---|---|---|---|
| 1 | Uruguay | 4 | 2 | 0 | 1 | 1 | 16 | 14 | +2 | 7 | Knockout stage |
| 2 | Ecuador | 4 | 1 | 1 | 1 | 1 | 25 | 18 | +7 | 6 | Knockout stage |
| 3 | Bolivia | 4 | 1 | 1 | 0 | 2 | 24 | 23 | +1 | 5 | Fifth place play-off |
| 4 | Peru (H) | 4 | 1 | 0 | 0 | 3 | 23 | 22 | +1 | 3 | Seventh place play-off |
| 5 | Venezuela | 4 | 1 | 0 | 0 | 3 | 13 | 24 | −11 | 3 | Ninth place play-off |

Source: BSWW
(H) Host
3 March 2018
18:15

| Uruguay | 3–1 | Venezuela |
|---|---|---|
| Laduche 3', 15'; Cazet 28' | Report(ru) | 2' Muñoz |

3 March 2018
20:45

| Peru | 7–8 (a.e.t.) | Bolivia |
|---|---|---|
| Velezmoro 3', 21', 36'; Valera 6'; Moscosco 17'; Cominges 9', 11' (pen.) | Report(ru) | 6' Huanca; 7' Garzon; 7' Poiqui; 11' Castedo; 29' Gutierrez; 30', 35', 37' (pen.) Eiffel |

4 March 2018
16:15

| Uruguay | 2–5 | Bolivia |
|---|---|---|
| Nico 11', 16' (pen.) | Report(ru) | 1' Eiffel; 12' (o.g.) Quinta; 26' Castedo; 31' Garzón; 34' Miranda |

4 March 2018
18:45

| Peru | 4–4 (a.e.t.) | Ecuador |
|---|---|---|
| Velezmoro 29', 39'; Reyes 29'; Valera 31' | Report(ru) | 7' Loor; 9' Gallego; 31' Villigua; 37' Bailon |
Penalties
| Cominges (penalty scored); Reyes (penalty scored); Moscoso (penalty scored); Valera (penalty missed) | 3–4 | (penalty scored) Loor; (penalty scored) Gallego; (penalty scored) Bailon; (penalty scored) Leon |

5 March 2018
16:15

| Venezuela | 6–4 | Bolivia |
|---|---|---|
| Semprun 2', 22'; Ramos 10'; Millan 12'; Rodriguez 21'; Prado 26' | Report(ru) | 3' Eiffel; 27' (pen.), 30' Miranda; 27' Gutiérrez |

5 March 2018
18:45

| Ecuador | 4–4 (a.e.t.) | Uruguay |
|---|---|---|
| Loor 4'; Cedeño 22'; Bailon 24'; Cevallos 38' | Report(ru) | 16', 39' (pen.) Laens; 22' Quinta; 33' Nico |
Penalties
| Loor (penalty scored); Gallegos (penalty missed); Bailon (penalty missed) | 1–2 | (penalty scored) Nico; (penalty scored) Laduche |

6 March 2018
16:15

| Ecuador | 9–3 | Venezuela |
|---|---|---|
| Cedeño 10', 17', 28'; Loor 14', 15'; Bailon 18', 32', 34'; Cevallos 33' | Report(ru) | 8' Prado; 14', 31' Vaamonde |

6 March 2018
18:45

| Peru | 4–7 | Uruguay |
|---|---|---|
| Velezmoro 7', 14'; Cominges 21', 23' | Report(ru) | 7', 15', 17' Miranda; 22' Quinta; 24', 30' Laens; 27' (o.g.) Palas |

7 March 2018
16:15

| Ecuador | 8–7 (a.e.t.) | Bolivia |
|---|---|---|
| Cedeño 6', 17', 23', 28', 36', 39'; Loor 28', 35' | Report(ru) | 6', 18' (pen.), 18' Castedo; 17', 32' Garzón; 30' Rocha; 33' Gutiérrez |

7 March 2018
18:45

| Peru | 8–3 | Venezuela |
|---|---|---|
| Velezmoro 5', 20', 21' (pen.), 24', 34'; Valera 12'; Paulino 29'; Ramos 29' (o.g.) | Report(ru) | 3' Semprun; 11' Muñoz; 15' Prado |

=== Group B ===
| Pos | Team | Pld | W | W+ | WP | L | GF | GA | GD | Pts | Qualification |
|---|---|---|---|---|---|---|---|---|---|---|---|
| 1 | Brazil | 4 | 4 | 0 | 0 | 0 | 34 | 9 | +25 | 12 | Knockout stage |
| 2 | Paraguay | 4 | 2 | 0 | 1 | 1 | 29 | 22 | +7 | 7 | Knockout stage |
| 3 | Argentina | 4 | 2 | 0 | 0 | 2 | 13 | 17 | −4 | 6 | Fifth place play-off |
| 4 | Chile | 4 | 1 | 0 | 0 | 3 | 13 | 34 | −21 | 3 | Seventh place play-off |
| 5 | Colombia | 4 | 0 | 0 | 0 | 4 | 14 | 21 | −7 | 0 | Ninth place play-off |

Source: BSWW
3 March 2018
17:00

| Brazil | 7–2 | Colombia |
|---|---|---|
| Felipe 1'; Lucao 6'; Datinha 20'; Nelito 21'; Rafinha 27' (pen.); Rodrigo 29'; Antonio 36' | Report(ru) | 5' Zuluaga; 24' Morilla |

3 March 2018
19:30

| Paraguay | 10–1 | Chile |
|---|---|---|
| Moran 4', 16'; C. Benitez 5'; Ojeda 7', 14', 31'; Barreto 14', 24', 32'; Gonzalez 17' | Report(ru) | 33' Abarca |

4 March 2018
15:00

| Brazil | 4–0 | Argentina |
|---|---|---|
| Felipe 15'; Fernando DDI 16'; Zé Lucas 24'; Datinha 25' | Report(ru) |

4 March 2018
17:30

| Colombia | 5–6 | Chile |
|---|---|---|
| Hurtado 18'; Bonilla 22', 27', 32'; Sánchez 30' | Report(ru) | 3', 18', 33' Cabezas; 24', 36' Vega; 27' Belaunde |

5 March 2018
15:00

| Argentina | 6–5 | Chile |
|---|---|---|
| Benaducci 9', 28'; Hilaire 19'; Marino 34'; Medero 25'; Ponzetti 34' (pen.) | Report(ru) | 14' Vega; 17' Flores; 25' Barraza; 28' Belaunde; 29' Cabezas |

5 March 2018
17:30

| Paraguay | 6–6 (a.e.t.) | Colombia |
|---|---|---|
| Barreto 7'; Ojeda 10', 32'; Moran 15' (pen.), 36'; Carballo 28' | Report(ru) | 3' (o.g.) Villaverde; 15', 22', 26', 29' Hurtado; 20' Zuluaga |
Penalties
| Carballo (penalty scored); Zayas (penalty scored); Moran (penalty scored); Rolón (penalty scored) | 4–3 | (penalty scored) Bonilla; (penalty scored) Rojas; (penalty scored) Mejía; (penalty missed) Arzuza Fonseca |

6 March 2018
15:00

| Brazil | 13–1 | Chile |
|---|---|---|
| Rodrigo 6', 17', 31'; Nelito 16', 22', 30'; Zé Lucas 19', 27'; Datinha 25', 32'; Felipe 25', 27'; Mao 35' | Report(ru) | 27' Durán |

6 March 2018
17:30

| Argentina | 5–7 | Paraguay |
|---|---|---|
| Cardozo 1'; Hilaire 12', 27'; Rutterschmidt 22'; Holmedilla 25' | Report(ru) | 1' (pen.), 30' Morán; 5', 23' Villaverde; 14', 28' Carballo; 27' Zayas |

7 March 2018
15:00

| Brazil | 10–6 | Paraguay |
|---|---|---|
| Felipe 3'; Rodrigo 6', 11', 19', 27', 33'; Nelito 7' (pen.), 15'; Fernando DDI 7', 9' | Report(ru) | 4' Carballo; 5', 6', 14' Moran; 20' Villaverde; 23' Zayas |

7 March 2018
17:30

| Argentina | 2–1 | Colombia |
|---|---|---|
| Holmedilla 26'; Medero 28' | Report(ru) | 28' Hurtado |

== Placement matches ==
=== Ninth place play-off ===
8 March 2018
15:00

| Venezuela | 4–4 (a.e.t.) | Colombia |
|---|---|---|
| Iriarte 5'; Vaamonde 10'; Rodríguez 14'; Muñoz 22' | Report(ru) | 1' Bonilla; 8' Rojas; 19' Henao; 22' Hurtado |
Penalties
| Semprún (penalty missed); Muñoz (penalty scored); Rodríguez (penalty missed) | 1–2 | (penalty scored) Bonilla; (penalty scored) Henao; (penalty missed) Rojas |

=== Seventh place play-off ===
8 March 2018
16:15

| Peru | 4–4 (a.e.t.) | Chile |
|---|---|---|
| Valera 6' (pen.); Velezmoro 35', 36', 39' | Report(ru) | 1', 1', 25' Vega; 39' Durán |
Penalties
| Reyes (penalty missed); Valera (penalty scored); Velezmoro (penalty scored) | 2–1 | (penalty missed) Barraza; (penalty missed) Flores; (penalty scored) Durán |

=== Fifth place play-off ===
8 March 2018
17:30

| Bolivia | 2–6 | Argentina |
|---|---|---|
| Eiffel 6', 35' | Report(ru) | 6' Benaducci; 11' Hilaire; 16' Medero; 23' Ponzetti; 31' Cardozo; 35' Marino |

== Knockout stage ==
Semi-finals
9 March
Brazil | 6
Ecuador | 2
9 March
Uruguay | 3
Paraguay | 11

Final
10 March
Brazil | 7
Paraguay | 3
Third place play-off
10 March
Ecuador | 4
Uruguay | 7

=== Semi-finals ===
9 March 2018
19:00

| Brazil | 6–2 | Ecuador |
|---|---|---|
| Datinha 1'; Felipe 2', 3'; Nelito 4'; Fernando DDI 19'; Antonio 29' | Report(ru) | 29', 31' Cedeño |

9 March 2018
20:15

| Uruguay | 3–11 | Paraguay |
|---|---|---|
| Capurro 31'; Laduche 32'; Laens 35' | Report(ru) | 1', 18' González; 10' Morán; 10' (pen.), 31', 33' Carballo; 13', 21', 36' C. Benítez; 17' Ojeda; 31' Rolón |

=== Third place play-off ===
10 March 2018
19:00

| Ecuador | 4–7 | Uruguay |
|---|---|---|
| Cedeño 10', 16', 23'; Bailon 33' | Report(ru) | 6', 13', 28' Laens; 16', 17' Laduche; 33' Martínez; 36' Capurro |

=== Final ===
10 March 2018
20:15

| Brazil | 7–3 | Paraguay |
|---|---|---|
| Felipe 1', 36'; Rodrigo 6', 19', 34'; Rafinha 16'; Antonio 35' | Report(ru) | 6' (pen.) Morán; 22' González; 25' Zayas |

== Awards ==
The following were presented immediately following the conclusion of the final.

=== Winners trophy ===
2018 Copa América of Beach Soccer
champions

Brazil
Second title

=== Individual awards ===
Top scorer(s)
| (Peru) Billivardo Velezmoro | (Ecuador) Daniel Cedeño |
15 goals
Best player
(Brazil) Rodrigo
Best goalkeeper
(Paraguay) Rolando González
Fair Play Award
Brazil

== Top goalscorers ==
Players with 6 or more goals

15 goals

- (Peru) Billivardo Velezmoro
- (Ecuador) Daniel Cedeño

12 goals

- (Brazil) Rodrigo

11 goals

- (Paraguay) Pedro Moran

9 goals

- (Brazil) Felipe

8 goals

- (Uruguay) Andres Laens

7 goals

- (Brazil) Nelito
- (Colombia) Oscar Hurtado
- (Bolivia) Mauricio Eiffel
- (Paraguay) Carlos Carballo

6 goals

- (Ecuador) Jorge Bailón
- (Chile) Sebastián Vega
- (Ecuador) Michael Loor
- (Paraguay) Luis Ojeda

== Final standings ==
| Pos | Grp | Team | Pld | W | W+ | WP | L | GF | GA | GD | Pts | Final result |
|---|---|---|---|---|---|---|---|---|---|---|---|---|
| 1 | B | Brazil | 6 | 6 | 0 | 0 | 0 | 47 | 14 | +33 | 18 | Champions |
| 2 | B | Paraguay | 6 | 3 | 0 | 1 | 2 | 43 | 32 | +11 | 10 | Runners-up |
| 3 | A | Uruguay | 6 | 3 | 0 | 1 | 2 | 26 | 29 | −3 | 10 | Third place |
| 4 | A | Ecuador | 6 | 1 | 1 | 1 | 3 | 31 | 31 | 0 | 6 | Fourth place |
| 5 | B | Argentina | 5 | 3 | 0 | 0 | 2 | 19 | 19 | 0 | 9 | Eliminated in Group stage |
| 6 | A | Bolivia | 5 | 1 | 1 | 0 | 3 | 26 | 29 | −3 | 5 | Eliminated in Group stage |
| 7 | A | Peru (H) | 5 | 1 | 0 | 1 | 3 | 27 | 26 | +1 | 4 | Eliminated in Group stage |
| 8 | B | Chile | 5 | 1 | 0 | 0 | 4 | 17 | 38 | −21 | 3 | Eliminated in Group stage |
| 9 | B | Colombia | 5 | 0 | 0 | 1 | 4 | 18 | 25 | −7 | 1 | Eliminated in Group stage |
| 10 | A | Venezuela | 5 | 1 | 0 | 0 | 4 | 17 | 28 | −11 | 3 | Eliminated in Group stage |

Source: BSWW
(H) Host
