= Colombia national beach soccer team =

National sports team

Colombia
- Nickname: Los Cafeteros (The Coffee Growers) La Tricolor (The Tricolors)
- Association: Federación Colombiana de Fútbol (FCF)
- Confederation: CONMEBOL (South America)
- Head coach: Santiago Alzate
- FIFA code: COL
- BSWW ranking: 15 ▼1 (6 May 2026)
First colours
Second colours

First international
- Colombia 5–2 Ecuador (Montevideo, Uruguay; 7 December 2009)

Biggest win
- Colombia 9–4 Ecuador (Rio de Janeiro, Brazil; 3 August 2011)

Biggest defeat
- Brazil 15–0 Colombia (Montevideo, Uruguay; 10 December 2009)

World Cup
- Appearances: 1 (first in 2023)
- Best result: Group stage

The Colombia national beach soccer team represents Colombia in international beach soccer competitions and is controlled by the Federación Colombiana de Fútbol (FCF), the governing body for football in Colombia.

Colombia entered the international beach soccer scene in 2009 at the first edition of the South American Beach Games, and made its debut at the CONMEBOL championship, the South American qualifying tournament for the FIFA Beach Soccer World Cup, in 2011, finishing fourth. The team competed irregularly through the 2010s before experiencing sustained growth under coach Santiago Alzate, who took charge of the senior side in 2019. In March 2023, Colombia reached the third-place play-off at the Copa América de Beach Soccer in Rosario, Argentina, beating Paraguay 7–5 to secure its first-ever qualification for the FIFA Beach Soccer World Cup. That year, Colombia hosted the 2023 South American Beach Games in Santa Marta and reached the men's beach soccer final for the only time to date, finishing as runners-up after losing 2–6 to Brazil, and won the gold medal in beach soccer at the 2023 Central American and Caribbean Games in San Salvador, defeating hosts El Salvador 7–4 in the final.

Colombia made its FIFA Beach Soccer World Cup debut at the 2024 edition in Dubai, United Arab Emirates, where it was eliminated in the group stage. The team returned to the Copa América de Beach Soccer in 2025, reaching the semi-finals before finishing fourth and narrowly missing a second consecutive World Cup berth.

== History ==
=== Early years ===
Colombia's beach soccer programme began in 2009, when the national team made its international debut at the inaugural South American Beach Games in Montevideo and Punta del Este, Uruguay, finishing fourth. Two years later the team debuted at the CONMEBOL championship, the qualifying tournament for the FIFA Beach Soccer World Cup, held in Rio de Janeiro, Brazil, again finishing fourth. Through the rest of the decade, Colombia took part irregularly in the CONMEBOL qualifiers and the South American Beach Games, generally finishing in the bottom half of the standings, including a seventh-place finish in the 2013 qualifiers, eighth in 2015, and sixth in both 2017 and the 2019 World Cup qualification.

=== First World Cup qualification ===
Under coach Santiago Alzate, who took charge of the senior national team in 2019, Colombia climbed from 30th to as high as 11th in the BSWW World Ranking.

In March 2023, Colombia competed at the Copa América de Beach Soccer in Rosario, Argentina, in which, for the first time, the top three finishers qualified directly for the FIFA Beach Soccer World Cup. After topping Group B with wins over Paraguay (5–4), Chile (3–2) and Venezuela (5–0), and a single defeat to Bolivia (2–3), Colombia advanced to the semi-finals, where it lost 0–2 to host nation Argentina. In the third-place play-off, Colombia defeated Paraguay 7–5 to claim the final South American qualifying place for the 2024 FIFA Beach Soccer World Cup, reaching the tournament for the first time in the team's history.

In July 2023, Colombia won the gold medal in beach soccer at the 2023 Central American and Caribbean Games in San Salvador. The team topped its group with wins over Mexico (9–6), Costa Rica (2–1) and Panama (8–4), defeated Venezuela 5–1 in the semi-final, and beat hosts El Salvador 7–4 in the final. Days later, Colombia hosted the 2023 South American Beach Games in Santa Marta and reached the men's beach soccer final for the only time to date, losing 2–6 to Brazil to take the silver medal.

=== FIFA Beach Soccer World Cup debut and recent campaigns ===
Colombia made its FIFA Beach Soccer World Cup debut at the 2024 edition in Dubai, United Arab Emirates, which had been postponed from its original 2023 dates. Drawn into Group C alongside Senegal, Belarus and Japan, Colombia lost a close opening match 3–5 to Senegal, then 2–3 to Japan, before being eliminated from contention with a defeat to group winners Belarus, finishing without a win in the group stage.

At the 2025 Copa América de Beach Soccer in Iquique, Chile, Colombia again reached the knockout stage. After a bye, the team won three of its four group matches, defeating Bolivia 7–6 and Ecuador 7–6, drawing 5–5 with Uruguay before losing on penalties, and beating hosts Chile 3–2 to finish first in Group A. Colombia then lost the semi-final 4–6 to eventual champions Brazil, and the third-place play-off 4–3 to Chile, finishing fourth and missing out on a place at the 2025 FIFA Beach Soccer World Cup.

== Achievements ==
  - 2011
- Copa América de Beach Soccer best: 3rd place
  - 2023
- South American Beach Games best: Runners-up
  - 2023
- Central American and Caribbean Games best: 1st place
  - 2023
- Central American and Caribbean Beach Games best: 5th place
  - 2022

== Competitive record ==
=== FIFA Beach Soccer World Cup ===
Year	Result	Pld	W	W+P	L	GF	GA	GD
(Brazil) 1995 to (United Arab Emirates) 2009	Did not enter							
(Italy) 2011 to (Russia) 2021	Did not qualify							
(United Arab Emirates) 2024	Group stage	3	0	0	3	6	12	–6
(Seychelles) 2025	Did not qualify							
Total	1/23	3	0	0	3	6	12	–6

=== Copa América de Beach Soccer ===
Year	Result	Pld	W	W+	WP	L	GF	GA	GD
(Brazil) 2016	Eighth place	5	2	0	0	3	16	20	–4
(Peru) 2018	Ninth place	5	0	0	1	4	18	25	–7
(Paraguay) 2022	Eighth place	5	0	0	2	3	12	23	–11
(Argentina) 2023	Third place	6	4	0	0	2	21	16	+5
(Chile) 2025	Fourth place	6	3	0	0	3	27	26	+1
Total	5/5	27	9	0	3	15	94	110	–16

=== CONMEBOL qualifiers for the FIFA Beach Soccer World Cup ===
Year	Result	Pld	W	W+	WP	L	GF	GA	GD
(Brazil) 2005^{†}	Did not enter								
(Brazil) 2006	Did not enter								
(Mexico) 2007^{†}	Did not enter								
(Argentina) 2008	Did not enter								
(Uruguay) 2009	Did not enter								
(Brazil) 2011	Fourth place	5	1	0	1	3	16	20	–4
(Argentina) 2013	Seventh place	6	3	0	0	3	19	24	–5
(Ecuador) 2015	Eighth place	6	0	1	0	5	17	30	–13
(Paraguay) 2017	Sixth place	6	2	0	0	4	30	32	–2
(Brazil) 2019	Sixth place	4	2	0	0	3	29	31	−2
(Brazil) 2021	Fourth place	6	3	0	0	2	17	18	–1
Total	6/11	33	11	1	1	20	128	155	–27

† – Note: 2005 and 2007 were held in a joint championship with CONCACAF

=== South American Beach Games ===
Year	Result	Pld	W	W+	WP	L	GF	GA	GD
(Uruguay) 2009	Fourth place	5	1	0	0	4	12	30	–18
(Ecuador) 2011	Fifth place	3	1	0	0	2	10	10	0
(Venezuela) 2014	Fifth place	5	2	0	0	3	12	18	–6
(Argentina) 2019	Third place	5	3	0	0	2	26	24	+2
(Colombia) 2023	Runners-up	—							
Total	5/5	18	7	0	0	11	60	82	–22

=== Central American and Caribbean Games ===
Central American and Caribbean Games record
Year	Result	Pos	Pld	W	L	GF	GA	GD
(El Salvador) 2023	Champions	1st	5	5	0	31	16	+15
Total	1 title	1/1	5	5	0	31	16	+15

=== Central American and Caribbean Beach Games ===
Central American and Caribbean Beach Games record
Year	Round	Pos	Pld	W	W+	L	GF	GA	GD
(Colombia) 2022	Fifth place	5th	4	1	0	3	14	14	0
Total	0 titles	1/1	4	1	0	3	14	14	0

== See also ==
- Colombia national futsal team
