= 2025 FIFA Beach Soccer World Cup =

Lakoup mondyal foutbol laplaz FIFA 2025 Coupe du monde de football de plage 2025

Tournament details
- Host country: Seychelles
- City: Victoria
- Dates: 1–11 May
- Teams: 16 (from 6 confederations)
- Venue: 1 (in 1 host city)

Final positions
- Champions: Brazil (7th title)
- Runners-up: Belarus
- Third place: Portugal
- Fourth place: Senegal

Tournament statistics
- Matches played: 32
- Goals scored: 288 (9 per match)
- Attendance: 79,736 (2,492 per match)
- Top scorer(s): (Belarus) Ihar Bryshtel (11 goals)
- Best player: (Brazil) Rodrigo
- Best goalkeeper: (Belarus) Mikhail Avgustov
- Fair play award: Japan

The 2025 FIFA Beach Soccer World Cup was the 13th edition of the FIFA Beach Soccer World Cup, an international beach soccer championship contested by senior men's national teams of the member associations of FIFA. Overall, this was the 23rd edition of a world cup in beach soccer since the establishment of the Beach Soccer World Championships which ran from 1995 to 2004 but was not governed by FIFA; the World Cup took place annually until 2009 when it then became a biennial event.

It took place in Victoria, the capital of Seychelles, on Mahé island, between 1 and 11 May 2025. This was the first time that Seychelles hosted a FIFA tournament, and the first edition of the World Cup to be played in Africa.

Brazil were the defending champions and successfully retained their title, defeating Belarus 4–3 in the final to claim their seventh FIFA title, and sixteenth overall.

== Host selection ==
The original bidding schedule to determine the hosts was as follows:

- 6 October 2021 – FIFA opens the bidding process.
- 29 October 2021 – Deadline for national associations to declare interest of hosting to FIFA.
- 1 November 2021 – FIFA circulates documents detailing the application campaign and conditions of participation to the bidding associations to analyze.
- 26 November 2021 – Deadline for associations to reaffirm their bidding intentions by agreeing to the terms of the documents.
- 30 January 2022 – Deadline for nations to prepare and submit their complete bidding packages to be evaluated by FIFA.
- 31 March 2022 – Hosts announced by FIFA.

On 8 December 2021, FIFA revealed that five associations had affirmed their bidding intentions:

- Bahrain (Bahrain Football Association)
- Colombia (Colombian Football Federation)
- Seychelles (Seychelles Football Federation)
- Thailand (Football Association of Thailand)
- United Arab Emirates (United Arab Emirates Football Association)

On 14 February 2022, FIFA announced that three of the five associations had submitted bids through to the final stage of the process, with Colombia and Thailand withdrawing.

Confirmation of the awarding of hosting rights was due to be announced at the FIFA Council meeting in Doha, Qatar on 31 March 2022. However, no announcement was made; it was then due to be awarded at its meeting in Auckland, New Zealand on 22 October 2022, but it was announced at the meeting that the decision had been deferred again until a subsequent Council meeting. On 16 December 2022, the United Arab Emirates was awarded the hosting rights for the 2023 tournament, and the Seychelles for the 2025 tournament.

== Qualification ==
Team qualified Team failed to qualify Team suspended Did not enter Not a FIFA member.

A total of 16 teams qualified for the final tournament. In addition to Seychelles who qualified automatically as the host country, 15 other teams qualified from six separate continental competitions. The slot allocation was approved by the FIFA Council on 4 October 2023. Overall, 72 nations entered qualification.

The process of qualification for the World Cup finals began in October 2024 and ended in March 2025.

Of the qualifiers, four made their debut: Chile, Guatemala, Mauritania and hosts Seychelles. This is Mauritania's and Seychelles' first ever FIFA tournament.

Paraguay and El Salvador were the returnees, both coming back after missing out on a berth in 2024.

United Arab Emirates failed to qualify for the first time since 2015. For the first instance since 2017, the United States also failed to advance to the finals. After appearing in 2024, Argentina, Colombia, Egypt and Mexico failed to qualify.

Note: The appearance statistics below refer only to the FIFA era of world cups in beach soccer (since 2005); see this article for the inclusion of World Championships era stats (1995–2004).

Confederation	Qualifying tournament	Team qualified	Appearances				Previous best performance
Confederation	Qualifying tournament	Team qualified	Total	First	Last	Streak	Previous best performance
AFC (Asia) (3 teams)	2025 AFC Beach Soccer Asian Cup	Iran	9th	2006	2024	2	Third place (2017, 2024)
AFC (Asia) (3 teams)	2025 AFC Beach Soccer Asian Cup	Japan	13th	2005	2024	13	Runners-up (2021)
AFC (Asia) (3 teams)	2025 AFC Beach Soccer Asian Cup	Oman	6th	2011	2024	4	Group stage (Six times) (Note: Oman have finished in the group stage in 2011, 2015, 2019, 2021 and 2024.)
CAF (Africa) (Hosts + 2 teams)	Host nation	Seychelles	1st	n/a	n/a	1	Debut
CAF (Africa) (Hosts + 2 teams)	2024 Beach Soccer Africa Cup of Nations	Mauritania	1st	n/a	n/a	1	Debut
CAF (Africa) (Hosts + 2 teams)	2024 Beach Soccer Africa Cup of Nations	Senegal	10th	2007	2024	8	Fourth place (2021)
CONCACAF (North America) (Note: Comprising Northern America, Central America, and the Caribbean) (2 teams)	2025 CONCACAF Beach Soccer Championship	El Salvador	6th	2008	2021	1	Fourth place (2011)
CONCACAF (North America) (2 teams)	2025 CONCACAF Beach Soccer Championship	Guatemala	1st	n/a	n/a	1	Debut
CONMEBOL (South America) (3 teams)	2025 Copa América of Beach Soccer	Brazil	13th	2005	2024	13	Champions (Six times) (Note: Brazil have won in 2006, 2007, 2008, 2009, 2017 and 2024.)
CONMEBOL (South America) (3 teams)	2025 Copa América of Beach Soccer	Paraguay	6th	2013	2021	1	Quarter-finals (2017)
CONMEBOL (South America) (3 teams)	2025 Copa América of Beach Soccer	Chile	1st	n/a	n/a	1	Debut
OFC (Oceania) (1 team)	2024 OFC Beach Soccer Men's Nations Cup	Tahiti	8th	2011	2024	8	Runners-up (2015, 2017)
UEFA (Europe) (4 teams)	2025 FIFA Beach Soccer World Cup qualification (UEFA)	Belarus	4th	2019	2024	4	Fourth place (2024)
UEFA (Europe) (4 teams)	2025 FIFA Beach Soccer World Cup qualification (UEFA)	Italy	10th	2006	2024	2	Runners-up (2008, 2019, 2024)
UEFA (Europe) (4 teams)	2025 FIFA Beach Soccer World Cup qualification (UEFA)	Portugal	12th	2005	2024	6	Champions (2015, 2019)
UEFA (Europe) (4 teams)	2025 FIFA Beach Soccer World Cup qualification (UEFA)	Spain	10th	2005	2024	3	Runners-up (2013)

== Venue ==
Location of The Paradise Arena in Victoria, where the tournament was held.

The single venue, named "The Paradise Arena", was located in the capital city of Victoria.

The venue was the same building as was used in the 2024 edition, disassembled and transported from Dubai, and reconstructed in Victoria. It has a capacity of 3,572.

== Draw ==
The draw to split the 16 teams into four groups of four took place at 19:00 SCT (UTC+4) on 4 April 2025 at in Victoria. The draw was conducted by Michael Mancienne and Sunday Oliseh.

The teams were divided into four pots of four based upon a ranking created by FIFA considering each team's total points at the World Cup over the past five editions (since 2015); the more recent the tournament, the more weight was given to those results, with 20% weight for the oldest year and increasing by 20% annually until 100% weight for the most recent year. Bonus points were also awarded to the teams that won their confederation's championship during qualifying. Using this ranking, the best-performing teams were placed in Pot 1 (plus the hosts), the next best performers were placed in Pot 2 and so on.

This resulted in the following composition pots:

Pot 1	Pot 2	Pot 3	Pot 4
Seychelles (Hosts; assigned to A1) (76); Brazil (Highest-ranked; assigned to D1) (1); Portugal (3); Tahiti (11)	Japan (10); Italy (2); Iran (7); Senegal (8)	Belarus (5); Oman (18); Paraguay (12); Spain (4)	El Salvador (16); Chile (42); Mauritania (34); Guatemala (50)

The numbers in parentheses show the BSWW World Ranking of the teams at the time of the draw, out of 90 nations. The rankings are displayed for context only and had no influence on the draw.

The draw started with Pot 1. As the hosts, the Seychelles were automatically assigned to position A1. The highest-ranked team, Brazil, was automatically assigned to position D1. The other teams were then drawn – the first out was placed into Group A, second into B and so on. The same was repeated for Pots 3 and 4. The exact positions in the groups the teams were allocated to was determined by the drawing of lots from an auxiliary pot. Teams from the same confederation could not be drawn into the same group.

The draw resulted in the following groups:

Group A
Pos	Team
A1	Seychelles
A2	Belarus
A3	Guatemala
A4	Japan

Group B
Pos	Team
B1	Mauritania
B2	Iran
B3	Portugal
B4	Paraguay

Group C
Pos	Team
C1	Spain
C2	Senegal
C3	Chile
C4	Tahiti

Group D
Pos	Team
D1	Brazil
D2	El Salvador
D3	Italy
D4	Oman

== Match officials ==
From the International Referees List, FIFA chose 24 officials from 24 different countries to adjudicate matches at the World Cup, who were revealed on 29 April 2025. All of the appointed officials are male.

At least one referee represented each of the six confederations of FIFA: four from the AFC, three from CAF, five from CONMEBOL, three from CONCACAF, one from the OFC, and eight from UEFA.

Confederation	Referee	Age	Qualified
AFC	(Oman) Fallah Al Balushi	41	2016
AFC	(United Arab Emirates) Ibrahim Alraeesi	40	2017
AFC	(Japan) Yuichi Hatano	44	2015
AFC	(Uzbekistan) Nayim Kosimov	36	2023
CAF	(Tunisia) Hamdi Bchir	39	2016
CAF	(Burundi) Ramadhani Ndayisaba	39	2022
CAF	(Mauritius) Louis Siave	36	2016
CONCACAF	(Dominican Republic) Juan Angeles	45	2012
CONCACAF	(El Salvador) Gonzalo Carballo	42	2014
CONCACAF	(Panama) Jorge Moran	32	2019
CONMEBOL	(Brazil) Lucas Estevão	39	2017
CONMEBOL	(Uruguay) Aecio Fernández	41	2018
CONMEBOL	(Colombia) Jorge Gómez	38	2016
CONMEBOL	(Peru) Mickie Palomino	43	2012
CONMEBOL	(Argentina) Mariano Romo	43	2013

Confederation	Referee	Age	Qualified
OFC	(French Polynesia) Aurélien Planchais-Godefroy	44	2018
UEFA
UEFA	(Italy) Saverio Bottalico	43	2017
UEFA	(France) Matthieu Dor	41	2020
UEFA	(Lithuania) Vitalij Gomolko	35	2015
UEFA	(Spain) Alejandro Ojaos	32	2022
UEFA	(Poland) Łukasz Ostrowski	39	2012
UEFA	(Portugal) Sérgio Soares	46	2014
UEFA	(Turkey) Özcan Sultanoğlu	39	2016
UEFA	(Bulgaria) Vladimir Tashkov	37	2016

== Squads ==
Each team named a preliminary squad of between 12 and 18 players. From the preliminary squad, the team named a final squad of 12 players (two of whom must be goalkeepers). Players in the final squad could be replaced by a player from the preliminary squad due to serious injury or illness up to 24 hours prior to kickoff of the team's first match.

The squads were revealed by FIFA on 15 April 2025.

== Group stage ==
In the group stage, if a match was level at the end of normal playing time, extra time should be played (one period of three minutes) and followed, if necessary, by kicks from the penalty mark to determine the winner. Each team earned three points for a win in regulation time, two points for a win in extra time, one point for a win in a penalty shoot-out, and no points for a defeat. The top two teams of each group advanced to the quarter-finals.

Tiebreakers

The rankings of teams in each group were determined as follows:

1. points obtained in all group matches;
2. goal difference in all group matches;
3. number of goals scored in all group matches;

If two or more teams are equal on the basis of the above three criteria, their rankings are determined as follows:

4. points obtained in the group matches between the teams concerned;
5. goal difference in the group matches between the teams concerned;
6. number of goals scored in the group matches between the teams concerned;
7. fair play points in all group matches (only one deduction could be applied to a player in a single match):
  - Yellow card: −1 points;
  - Indirect red card (second yellow card): −3 points;
  - Direct red card: −4 points;
  - Yellow card and direct red card: −5 points;
8. drawing of lots by the FIFA Organising Committee.

All times are local, SCT (UTC+4).

=== Group A ===
Pos	Team	Pld	W	W+	WP	L	GF	GA	GD	Pts	Qualification
1	Belarus	3	3	0	0	0	24	9	+15	9	Knockout stage
2	Japan	3	2	0	0	1	19	10	+9	6	Knockout stage
3	Guatemala	3	1	0	0	2	9	21	−12	3	
4	Seychelles (H)	3	0	0	0	3	8	20	−12	0	

Source: FIFA
Rules for classification: Tiebreakers
(H) Host
1 May 2025
15:00

Guatemala	2–6	Japan
Marroquin 2'; M. González 2'	Report	Tsuboya 2', 35'; Matsuda 11'; Furusato 28'; Akaguma 29'; Ozu 32'

Paradise Arena, Victoria
Attendance: 1,003
Referee: Özcan Sultanoğlu (Turkey)
Man of the match: Takeru Furusato (Japan)
1 May 2025
19:00

Seychelles	3–6	Belarus
De Ketelaere 5'; Labrosse 21'; Amade 22'	Report	Drozd 11', 14', 22'; Ryabko 15'; Bryshtel 32'; Chaikouski 35'

Paradise Arena, Victoria
Attendance: 3,572
Referee: Gonzalo Carballo (El Salvador)
Man of the match: Artsemi Drozd (Belarus)

3 May 2025
15:00

Japan	3–6	Belarus
Suzuki 16'; Oba 26'; Ozu 29'	Report	Novikau 6', 19', 23'; Hapon 21'; Bokach 26' (pen.); Drozd 35'

Paradise Arena, Victoria
Attendance: 1,041
Referee: Hamdi Bchir (Tunisia)
Man of the match: Yauheni Novikau (Belarus)
3 May 2025
19:00

Seychelles	3–4	Guatemala
Labrosse 4'; De Ketelaere 6'; Amade 9'	Report	M. González 8', 9', 11', 25'

Paradise Arena, Victoria
Attendance: 3,572
Referee: Fallah Al Balushi (Oman)
Man of the match: Miguel González (Guatemala)

5 May 2025
15:00

Belarus	12–3	Guatemala
A. Hapon 6'; Ryabko 12', 16', 32', 33'; Bryshtel 14', 24', 27', 31'; Ustsinovich 20'; Bokach 22', 26'	Report	Crocker 27'; Montepegue 28'; Marroquín 30'

Paradise Arena, Victoria
Attendance: 795
Referee: Louis Siave (Mauritius)
Man of the match: Ihar Bryshtel (Belarus)
5 May 2025
19:00

Japan	10–2	Seychelles
Oba 10', 26'; Akaguma 12', 14', 17', 34'; Eguro 19'; Tsuboya 19'; Matsumoto 23' (pen.); Suzuki 24'	Report	Bibi 11', 16'

Paradise Arena, Victoria
Attendance: 3,572
Referee: Saverio Bottalico (Italy)
Man of the match: Takuya Akaguma (Japan)

=== Group B ===
Pos	Team	Pld	W	W+	WP	L	GF	GA	GD	Pts	Qualification
1	Portugal	3	3	0	0	0	26	18	+8	9	Knockout stage
2	Iran	3	2	0	0	1	15	12	+3	6	Knockout stage
3	Paraguay	3	1	0	0	2	19	21	−2	3	
4	Mauritania	3	0	0	0	3	13	22	−9	0	

Source: FIFA
Rules for classification: Tiebreakers
1 May 2025
16:30

Mauritania	4–5	Iran
Belkheir 9', 20', 35'; Bilal 33'	Report	Mirshekari 5'; Mohammadpour 7'; Shir 9'; Mokhtari 12', 16'

Paradise Arena, Victoria
Attendance: 1,272
Referee: Vitalij Gomolko (Lithuania)
Man of the match: Cheikh Belkheir (Mauritania)
1 May 2025
20:30

Portugal	11–9	Paraguay
Coimbra 2'; Brilhante 4'; Pintado 4', 16', 27'; Lourenço 9', 14'; L. Martins 16' (pen.); B. Martins 25', 27', 31' (pen.)	Report	Carballo 4'; V. Benítez 10'; Y. Rolón 19'; N. Medina 29'; Barrios 33', 34', 36'; J. Rolón 33'; Martínez 36'

Paradise Arena, Victoria
Attendance: 2,825
Referee: Yuichi Hatano (Japan)
Man of the match: Bê Martins (Portugal)

3 May 2025
16:30

Paraguay	1–5	Iran
M. Medina 20'	Report	Mohammadpour 2'; Mirjalili 4'; Nazem 23'; Shir 30'; Masoumi 36'

Paradise Arena, Victoria
Attendance: 1,237
Referee: Vladimir Tashkov (Bulgaria)
Man of the match: Mehdi Mirjalili (Iran)
3 May 2025
20:30

Mauritania	4–8	Portugal
Bilal 12'; Salem 22', 35'; Belkheir 36'	Report	P. Mano 6'; Tim 11'; Jordan 14'; L. Martins 15'; Lourenço 18', 23'; Pintado 19'; B. Lopes 22'

Paradise Arena, Victoria
Attendance: 3,319
Referee: Aurélien Planchais-Godefroy (Tahiti)
Man of the match: André Lourenço (Portugal)

5 May 2025
16:30

Paraguay	9–5	Mauritania
Ovelár 4'; V. Benítez 5', 34'; N. Medina 21', 32'; M. Medina 25'; Martínez 28'; J. Benítez 29' (pen.); Barrios 35'	Report	Bilal 4'; Belkheir 12', 18', 34'; Diallo 27'

Paradise Arena, Victoria
Attendance: 1,006
Referee: Alejandro Ojaos (Spain)
Man of the match: Thiago Barrios (Paraguay)
5 May 2025
20:30

Iran	5–7	Portugal
Nazarzadeh 3', 33'; Amiri 11'; Mokhtari 26'; Mohammadpour 33'	Report	Lourenço 10', 18'; Coimbra 15'; Jordan 15'; B. Martins 20', 25'; Pintado 30' (pen.)

Paradise Arena, Victoria
Attendance: 3,289
Referee: Mariano Romo (Argentina)
Man of the match: André Lourenço (Portugal)

=== Group C ===
Pos	Team	Pld	W	W+	WP	L	GF	GA	GD	Pts	Qualification
1	Senegal	3	3	0	0	0	17	7	+10	9	Knockout stage
2	Spain	3	2	0	0	1	13	9	+4	6	Knockout stage
3	Chile	3	1	0	0	2	12	17	−5	3	
4	Tahiti	3	0	0	0	3	12	21	−9	0	

Source: FIFA
Rules for classification: Tiebreakers
2 May 2025
16:30

Chile	7–6	Tahiti
Albuerno 3'; San Martin 8'; Tobar 15'; Durán 18'; Opazo 22', 34'; Bacian 23'	Report	Salem 4', 7', 17'; Tinirauarii 18', 35'; Terorotua 35'

Paradise Arena, Victoria
Attendance: 958
Referee: Ramadhani Ndayisaba (Burundi)
Man of the match: Diego Opazo (Chile)
2 May 2025
20:30

Spain	1–4	Senegal
Antonio 31'	Report	Thiaw 2'; Ndiaye 13'; Fall 27'; Sylla 31'

Paradise Arena, Victoria
Attendance: 3,373
Referee: Aecio Fernández (Uruguay)
Man of the match: Al Seyni Ndiaye (Senegal)

4 May 2025
16:30

Tahiti	3–6	Senegal
Taiarui 7'; Chan-Kat 12'; Paama 14'	Report	Sylla 3', 33'; Mam. Diagne 19', 35'; Gadiaga 23'; Faye 29'

Paradise Arena, Victoria
Attendance: 2,018
Referee: Vitalij Gomolko (Lithuania)
Man of the match: Ninou Diatta (Senegal)
4 May 2025
20:30

Spain	4–2	Chile
Batis 4', 28'; Chiky 6'; Kuman 10'	Report	San Martin 6'; Araya 36'

Paradise Arena, Victoria
Attendance: 3,355
Referee: Jorge Moran (Panama)
Man of the match: Suli Batis (Spain)

6 May 2025
16:30

Senegal	7–3	Chile
Man. Diagne 2', 21'; Fall 8', 17'; Diatta 14', 35'; Thiaw 33' (pen.)	Report	Tobar 15', 33'; San Martin 34'

Paradise Arena, Victoria
Attendance: 1,787
Referee: Vladimir Tashkov (Bulgaria)
Man of the match: Mandione Diagne (Senegal)
6 May 2025
20:30

Tahiti	3–8	Spain
Tinirauarii 20' (pen.); Chiky 21' (o.g.); Salem 36'	Report	Ramy 11', 27'; D. Ardil 19'; Batis 20', 29'; Juanmi 21'; Chiky 21'; Galindo 36'

Paradise Arena, Victoria
Attendance: 3,307
Referee: Jorge Gómez (Colombia)
Man of the match: Kuman (Spain)

=== Group D ===
Pos	Team	Pld	W	W+	WP	L	GF	GA	GD	Pts	Qualification
1	Brazil	3	3	0	0	0	16	3	+13	9	Knockout stage
2	Italy	3	2	0	0	1	13	6	+7	6	Knockout stage
3	Oman	3	0	0	1	2	9	22	−13	1	
4	El Salvador	3	0	0	0	3	5	12	−7	0	

Source: FIFA
Rules for classification: Tiebreakers
2 May 2025
15:00

Italy	7–4	Oman
Fazzini 1'; Zurlo 5'; Bertacca 17'; Genovali 19'; Remedi 30'; Josep Jr. 31', 32'	Report	Al Bulushi 9'; Al Muraiki 10', 31'; Musa. Al Araimi 24'

Paradise Arena, Victoria
Attendance: 802
Referee: Mariano Romo (Argentina)
Man of the match: Josep Jr. (Italy)
2 May 2025
19:00

Brazil	3–1	El Salvador
Rodrigo 6'; Thanger 27'; Lucão 29'	Report	Ramos 13'

Paradise Arena, Victoria
Attendance: 3,184
Referee: Ibrahim Alraeesi (United Arab Emirates)
Man of the match: Thanger (Brazil)

4 May 2025
15:00

Oman	4–4 (a.e.t.)	El Salvador
Musa. Al Araimi 1'; Al Muraiki 20' (pen.); S. Al Oraimi 30'; Al Bulushi 34'	Report	Cerna 8'; Batres 18'; Castro 24' (pen.); Frank 30'
Penalties
Al Zadjali (penalty scored); A. Al Owaisi (penalty scored); Musa. Al Araimi (penalty scored); Al Muraiki (penalty scored); Mush. Al Araimi (penalty scored); Al Bulushi (penalty scored); Al Sauti (penalty scored)	7–6	(penalty scored) Frank; (penalty scored) Ruiz; (penalty scored) Ramos; (penalty scored) Castro; (penalty scored) Gonzalez; (penalty scored) Cerna; (penalty missed) Robles

Paradise Arena, Victoria
Attendance: 1,449
Referee: Sérgio Soares (Portugal)
Man of the match: Musallam Al Araimi (Oman)
4 May 2025
19:00

Brazil	2–1	Italy
Mauricinho 11', 33'	Report	Fazzini 14'

Paradise Arena, Victoria
Attendance: 3,572
Referee: Lukasz Ostrowski (Poland)
Man of the match: Mauricinho (Brazil)

6 May 2025
15:00

El Salvador	0–5	Italy
	Report	Genovali 9', 21' (pen.); Bertacca 12'; Josep Jr. 24' (pen.); Zurlo 30'

Paradise Arena, Victoria
Attendance: 1,318
Referee: Nayim Kosimov (Uzbekistan)
Man of the match: Gianmarco Genovali (Italy)
6 May 2025
19:00

Oman	1–11	Brazil
Al Bulushi 33'	Report	Edson Hulk 2'; Rodrigo 2'; Thanger 4'; Brendo 10', 30'; Benjamin Jr. 25', 36'; Catarino 25', 34', 36'; Mauricinho 35'

Paradise Arena, Victoria
Attendance: 3,484
Referee: Juan Angeles (Dominican Republic)
Man of the match: Rodrigo (Brazil)

== Knockout stage ==
Quarter-finals
8 May
Belarus	4
Iran	3
8 May
Senegal (a.e.t.)	4
Italy	3
8 May
Portugal	7
Japan	6
8 May
Brazil	6
Spain	0

Semi-finals
10 May
Belarus	5
Senegal	2
10 May
Portugal	2
Brazil	4

Final
11 May
Belarus	3
Brazil	4
Third place match
11 May
Senegal	2
Portugal	3

=== Quarter-finals ===
8 May 2025
15:00

Belarus	4–3	Iran
Bryshtel 18' (pen.), 27'; Hardzetski 27'; Ryabko 29'	Report	Masoumi 12', 32'; Mohammadpour 36'

Paradise Arena, Victoria
Attendance: 1,512
Referee: Sérgio Soares (Portugal)
Man of the match: Ihar Bryshtel (Belarus)

8 May 2025
16:30

Portugal	7–6	Japan
Jordan 3', 30', 34'; Pintado 7', 35'; Brilhante 24'; B. Martins 26'	Report	Suzuki 6'; Oba 18'; Matsuda 28'; Kawai 30'; Ozu 30', 34'

Paradise Arena, Victoria
Attendance: 2,442
Referee: Vladimir Tashkov (Bulgaria)
Man of the match: Bê Martins (Portugal)

8 May 2025
19:00

Senegal	4–3 (a.e.t.)	Italy
Mam. Diagne 1', 39'; Thiaw 20' (pen.); Faye 26'	Report	Fazzini 15'; Zurlo 18'; Marchesi 21'

Paradise Arena, Victoria
Attendance: 3,120
Referee: Mariano Romo (Argentina)
Man of the match: Mamour Diagne (Senegal)

8 May 2025
20:30

Brazil	6–0	Spain
Rodrigo 5', 6'; Benjamin Jr. 14'; Catarino 33'; Teleco 35'; Filipe 36'	Report

Paradise Arena, Victoria
Attendance: 3,572
Referee: Gonzalo Carballo (El Salvador)
Man of the match: Rodrigo (Brazil)

=== Semi-finals ===
10 May 2025
18:00

Belarus	5–2	Senegal
Avgustov 3'; Bryshtel 15', 24'; Hapon 16'; Bokach 35'	Report	Fall 9'; Mam. Diagne 27'

Paradise Arena, Victoria
Attendance: 3,356
Referee: Yuichi Hatano (Japan)
Man of the match: Mikhail Avgustov (Belarus)

10 May 2025
19:30

Portugal	2–4	Brazil
B. Lopes 8'; Lourenço 19'	Report	Thanger 13'; Filipe 16'; Rodrigo 28'; Catarino 32'

Paradise Arena, Victoria
Attendance: 3,572
Referee: Łukasz Ostrowski (Poland)
Man of the match: Antonio (Brazil)

=== Third place match ===
11 May 2025
18:00

Senegal	2–3	Portugal
Diatta 3'; Fall 31'	Report	Gadiaga 26' (o.g.); Coimbra 32'; Lourenço 34' (pen.)

Paradise Arena, Victoria
Attendance: 3,480
Referee: Mariano Romo (Argentina)
Man of the match: Bê Martins (Portugal)

=== Final ===
11 May 2025
19:30

Belarus	3–4	Brazil
Novikau 7'; Bryshtel 29', 30'	Report	Lucão 2'; Rodrigo 13', 35'; Catarino 13'

Paradise Arena, Victoria
Attendance: 3,572
Referee: Aecio Fernández (Uruguay)
Man of the match: Rodrigo (Brazil)

== Winners ==
2025 FIFA Beach Soccer World Cup
Champions

Brazil
Seventh title
16th world title

== Awards ==
After the final, FIFA presented individual awards to the three best players of the tournament, three top goalscorers, and to the best goalkeeper. In addition, a collective award was given to the team with the most points in the Fair Play ranking.

The individual awards were all sponsored by Adidas, except for the FIFA Fair Play Award.

Golden Ball	Silver Ball	Bronze Ball
(Brazil) Rodrigo	(Belarus) Ihar Bryshtel	(Portugal) Bê Martins
Golden Scorer	Silver Scorer	Bronze Scorer
(Belarus) Ihar Bryshtel (11 goals)	(Portugal) André Lourenço (8 goals)	(Brazil) Rodrigo (7 goals)
Golden Glove
(Belarus) Mikhail Avgustov
FIFA Fair Play Award
Japan

== Statistics ==
=== Goalscorers ===
There were 288 goals scored in 32 matches, for an average of 9 goals per match. Ihar Bryshtel became the third man to end as top scorer in consecutive editions, after Madjer (2005 and 2006) and Gabriele Gori (2017 and 2019).

11 goals

- (Belarus) Ihar Bryshtel

8 goals

- (Portugal) André Lourenço

7 goals

- (Brazil) Rodrigo
- (Mauritania) Cheikh Belkheir
- (Portugal) Miguel Pintado

6 goals

- (Belarus) Anatoliy Ryabko
- (Brazil) Catarino
- (Portugal) Bê Martins

5 goals

- (Guatemala) Miguel González
- (Japan) Takuya Akaguma
- (Portugal) Jordan Santos
- (Senegal) Mamour Diagne
- (Senegal) Sidy Fall

4 goals

- (Belarus) Vadzim Bokach
- (Belarus) Artsemi Drozd
- (Belarus) Yauheni Novikau
- (Iran) Movahed Mohammadpour
- (Japan) Ozu Moreira
- (Japan) Takaaki Oba
- (Paraguay) Thiago Barrios
- (Spain) Suli Batos
- (French Polynesia) Heirauarii Salem

3 goals

- (Belarus) Aleh Hapon
- (Brazil) Benjamin Jr.
- (Brazil) Mauricinho
- (Brazil) Thanger
- (Chile) Diego San Martin
- (Chile) Héctor Tobar
- (Iran) Mohammad Masoumi
- (Iran) Mohammadali Mokhtari
- (Italy) Tommaso Fazzini
- (Italy) Gianmarco Genovali
- (Italy) Josep Junior
- (Italy) Emmanuele Zurlo
- (Japan) Masato Suzuki
- (Japan) Ryota Tsuboya
- (Mauritania) Ahmedou Bilal
- (Oman) Sami Al Bulushi
- (Oman) Yahya Al Muriki
- (Paraguay) Valentín Benítez
- (Paraguay) Néstor Medina
- (Portugal) Rui Coimbra
- (Senegal) Ninou Diatta
- (Senegal) Mamadou Sylla
- (Senegal) Sanou Thiaw
- (French Polynesia) Ro'onui Tinirauarii

2 goals

- (Brazil) Brendo
- (Brazil) Filipe Silva
- (Brazil) Lucão
- (Chile) Diego Opazo
- (Guatemala) Berny Marroquín
- (Iran) Reza Amiri
- (Iran) Mohammadali Nazarzadeh
- (Iran) Mahdi Shir
- (Italy) Luca Bertacca
- (Japan) Kosuke Matsuda
- (Mauritania) Hamdy Salem
- (Oman) Musallam Al Araimi
- (Paraguay) Mathías Martínez
- (Paraguay) Milciades Medina
- (Portugal) Ruben Brilhante
- (Portugal) Bernardo Lopes
- (Portugal) Léo Martins
- (Senegal) Mandione Diagne
- (Senegal) Ousseynou Faye
- (Seychelles) Terrence Amade
- (Seychelles) Lienal Bibi
- (Seychelles) Remy De Ketelaere
- (Seychelles) Brandon Labrosse
- (Spain) Chiky Ardil
- (Spain) Ramy Saghdani

1 goal

- (Belarus) Mikhail Avgustov
- (Belarus) Mikita Chaikouski
- (Belarus) Yahor Hardzetski
- (Belarus) Uladzimir Ustsinovich
- (Brazil) Edson Hulk
- (Brazil) Teleco
- (Chile) Andrés Albuerño
- (Chile) Gabriel Bacian
- (Chile) Daniel Durán
- (Chile) César Rama
- (Guatemala) Pablo Crocker
- (Guatemala) Erick Montepeque
- (Iran) Seyed Mirjalili
- (Iran) Ali Nazem
- (Italy) Camillo Marchesi
- (Italy) Alessandro Remedi
- (Japan) Chikara Eguro
- (Japan) Takeru Furusato
- (Japan) Yusuke Kawai
- (Japan) Ken Matsumoto
- (Mauritania) Mohamed Diallo
- (Oman) Salim Al Oraimi
- (Paraguay) Jhovanny Benítez
- (Paraguay) Carlos Carballo
- (Paraguay) Carlos Ovelár
- (Paraguay) Jesús Rolón
- (Paraguay) Yoao Rolón
- (Portugal) Pedro Mano
- (Portugal) Filipe Tim
- (Senegal) Seydina Gadiaga
- (Senegal) Al Seyni Ndiaye
- (El Salvador) Jose Batres
- (El Salvador) Andersson Castro
- (El Salvador) Emerson Cerna
- (El Salvador) Heber Ramos
- (El Salvador) Frank Velásquez
- (Spain) Antonio Mayor
- (Spain) David Ardil
- (Spain) Roberto Galindo
- (Spain) Juanmi
- (Spain) Kuman
- (French Polynesia) Gervais Chan-Kat
- (French Polynesia) Matatia Paama
- (French Polynesia) Heimanu Taiarui
- (French Polynesia) Heimaru Terorotua

1 own goal

- (Spain) Chiky Ardil (vs. Tahiti)
- (Senegal) Seydina Gadiaga (vs. Portugal)

Source: BSWW

== Marketing ==
=== Logo ===
On 3 May 2024, the official emblem and brand identity were unveiled at the Kempinski Seychelles Resort. On 3 December 2024, the official poster was revealed.

=== Official ball ===
On 27 November 2024, FIFA and Adidas announced the official match ball is the Adidas CNXT25 PRO BCH.

=== Theme song ===
On 3 April 2025, the official song for the tournament, entitled Boom SE SE, was announced by FIFA. The song was performed by two popular artists in the region, Elijah Seychelles and Taniah, at the draw.

=== Mascot ===
On 7 March 2025, the mascot was revealed, a turtle named "TiKay". The mascot pays homage to the essence of the competition's first edition to take place in Africa. Its name comes from the French word "petit," which means small, and from the abbreviated Seychellois Creole word for "scales." According to an official FIFA press release, "TiKay" was "born amongst the dunes of the Seychelles’ powdery white sands, he embodies the spectacular beaches, local culture and biodiversity of the host nation and its pristine surrounding waters." The mascot's debut took place at Beau Vallon Beach, with the nation's president, Wavel Ramkalawan, was present. More than 40 children, coaches, and members of the Seychellois beach soccer national team joined in a beach soccer activity to promote the sport to local youth.

=== Sponsorships ===
FIFA partners	FIFA Beach Soccer World Cup supporters
Adidas; Aramco; Coca-Cola; Hyundai–Kia; Lenovo; Qatar Airways; Visa	Nouvobanq; Seychelles Breweries (Guinness); Valvoline; Visit Seychelles
