= 2016 Copa América of Beach Soccer =

Copa América de Fútbol Playa Brasil 2016

Tournament details
- Host country: Brazil
- Dates: 13–18 December
- Teams: 10 (from 1 confederation)
- Venue(s): 1 (in 1 host city)

Final positions
- Champions: Brazil (1st title)
- Runners-up: Paraguay
- Third place: Venezuela
- Fourth place: Uruguay

Tournament statistics
- Matches played: 25
- Goals scored: 221 (8.84 per match)
- Top scorer(s): (Venezuela) Alexander Vaamonde (12 goals)
- Best player(s): (Brazil) Bruno Xavier
- Best goalkeeper: (Brazil) Mão

The 2016 Copa América of Beach Soccer (known natively in Spanish as the Copa América de Futbol Playa) was the first edition of the Copa América of Beach Soccer, the premier international beach soccer competition in South America, contested between the men's national teams of the members of CONMEBOL.

The competition was organised by CONMEBOL; other beach soccer exhibition events held under the Copa América title took place during 1994–99, 2003 and 2012–14, however this was the first edition to be officially organised by the governing body for South American football who also organise the other official Copa América events in association football and futsal.

The tournament was hosted by Brazil in the city of Santos between 13 and 18 December.

Brazil beat Paraguay 12–2 in the final to claim the inaugural crown.

== Teams ==
Teams representing all 10 members of CONMEBOL took part.

- Argentina
- Bolivia
- Brazil
- Chile
- Colombia
- Ecuador
- Paraguay
- Peru
- Venezuela
- Uruguay

== Venue ==
Location of Santos in Brazil

One venue was used in the city of Santos, Brazil.

- An arena built on the Praia do Gonzaga (Gonzaga beach) hosted all the matches.

== Referees ==
Fourteen officials were appointed by CONMEBOL on 17 November, instructed to arrive in Santos by 11 December.

- (Argentina) Mariano Romo
- (Bolivia) Jose Mendoza
- (Brazil) Ivo De Moraes
- (Brazil) Renato De Carlos
- (Chile) Carlos Rumiano
- (Colombia) Juan Carlos Amaya
- (Ecuador) Fabricio Quintero
- (Ecuador) Jose Cortez
- (Paraguay) Jorge Luis Martinez
- (Peru) Mike Palomino
- (Peru) Alex Valdiviezo
- (Uruguay) Pablo Cadenasso
- (Uruguay) Carlos Aguirregaray
- (Venezuela) Jose Gregorio Misel

== Draw ==
The draw to split the ten teams into two groups of five took place on 26 November in Luque, Paraguay at the Auditorio de la Confederación Sudamericana de Fútbol.

The teams were seeded based on their final ranking in the most recent previous CONMEBOL beach soccer tournament, the 2015 South American Beach Soccer Championship.

Initially, the top two seeds were automatically assigned to the groups:

- to Group A: as the top seeds, Brazil
- to Group B: as the second seeds, Paraguay

The remaining eight teams were split into four pots of two based on their seeding, in order from the highest seeds placed in Pot 1, down to the lowest seeds placed in Pot 4. From each pot, one team was drawn into Group A and the other team was drawn into Group B.

Pot 1	Pot 2	Pot 3	Pot 4
Argentina; Ecuador	Uruguay; Peru	Chile; Colombia	Bolivia; Venezuela

== Group stage ==
Each team earns three points for a win in regulation time, two points for a win in extra time, one point for a win in a penalty shoot-out, and no points for a defeat. The top team of each group, advance to the final. The teams finishing in second through fifth proceed to play in consolation matches against the teams finishing in the same position in the other group to determine their final rank.

All times are local, BRST (UTC−2).

=== Group A ===
Pos	Team	Pld	W	W+	WP	L	GF	GA	GD	Pts	Qualification
1	Brazil	4	4	0	0	0	32	8	+24	12	Advance to the Final
2	Uruguay	4	2	0	1	1	14	13	+1	7	Third place play-off
3	Chile	4	1	0	0	3	14	16	−2	3	Fifth place play-off
4	Bolivia	4	1	0	0	3	12	23	−11	3	Seventh place play-off
5	Argentina	4	1	0	0	3	11	23	−12	3	Ninth place play-off

Source: BSWW

13 December 2016	Argentina	2–6	Chile	Praia do Gonzaga, Santos
15:00		Report(ru)

13 December 2016	Bolivia	1–9	Brazil	Praia do Gonzaga, Santos
17:30		Report(ru)

14 December 2016	Chile	2–3	Bolivia	Praia do Gonzaga, Santos
15:00		Report(ru)

14 December 2016	Argentina	1–3	Uruguay	Praia do Gonzaga, Santos
17:30		Report(ru)

15 December 2016	Uruguay	6–3	Bolivia	Praia do Gonzaga, Santos
15:00		Report(ru)

15 December 2016	Brazil	8–3	Chile	Praia do Gonzaga, Santos
17:30		Report(ru)

16 December 2016	Argentina	6–5	Bolivia	Praia do Gonzaga, Santos
15:00		Report(ru)

16 December 2016	Brazil	6–2	Uruguay	Praia do Gonzaga, Santos
17:30		Report(ru)

17 December 2016	Brazil	9–2	Argentina	Praia do Gonzaga, Santos
11:45		Report(ru)

17 December 2016	Uruguay	3–3 (a.e.t.) (2–1 p)	Chile	Praia do Gonzaga, Santos
13:00		Report(ru)

=== Group B ===
Pos	Team	Pld	W	W+	WP	L	GF	GA	GD	Pts	Qualification
1	Paraguay	4	2	0	0	2	17	14	+3	6	Advance to the Final
2	Venezuela	4	2	0	0	2	16	16	0	6	Third place play-off
3	Peru	4	2	0	0	2	16	16	0	6	Fifth place play-off
4	Colombia	4	2	0	0	2	12	14	−2	6	Seventh place play-off
5	Ecuador	4	1	0	1	2	17	18	−1	4	Ninth place play-off

Source: BSWW

13 December 2016	Ecuador	2–3	Colombia	Praia do Gonzaga, Santos
13:45		Report(ru)

13 December 2016	Venezuela	3–5	Paraguay	Praia do Gonzaga, Santos
16:15		Report(ru)

14 December 2016	Colombia	1–5	Venezuela	Praia do Gonzaga, Santos
13:45		Report(ru)

14 December 2016	Ecuador	3–6	Peru	Praia do Gonzaga, Santos
16:15		Report(ru)

15 December 2016	Peru	2–3	Venezuela	Praia do Gonzaga, Santos
13:45		Report(ru)

15 December 2016	Paraguay	2–4	Colombia	Praia do Gonzaga, Santos
16:15		Report(ru)

16 December 2016	Ecuador	8–5	Venezuela	Praia do Gonzaga, Santos
13:45		Report(ru)

16 December 2016	Paraguay	6–3	Peru	Praia do Gonzaga, Santos
16:15		Report(ru)

17 December 2016	Peru	5–4	Colombia	Praia do Gonzaga, Santos
09:00		Report(ru)

17 December 2016	Paraguay	4–4 (a.e.t.) (4–5 p)	Ecuador	Praia do Gonzaga, Santos
11:45		Report(ru)

== Final stage ==
=== Ninth place play-off ===
18 December 2016
08:45

Argentina	5–11	Ecuador
	Report(ru)

Praia do Gonzaga, Santos

=== Seventh place play-off ===
18 December 2016
10:00

Bolivia	6–4	Colombia
	Report(ru)

Praia do Gonzaga, Santos

=== Fifth place play-off ===
18 December 2016
11:15

Chile	3–4	Peru
	Report(ru)

Praia do Gonzaga, Santos

=== Third place play-off ===
18 December 2016
12:30

Uruguay	6–7	Venezuela
	Report(ru)

Praia do Gonzaga, Santos

=== Final ===
18 December 2016
14:00

Brazil	12–2	Paraguay
	Report(ru)

Praia do Gonzaga, Santos

== Awards ==
=== Winners trophy ===
2016 Copa América of Beach Soccer
champions

Brazil
First title

=== Individual awards ===
Top scorer
(Venezuela) Alexander Vaamonde
12 goals
Best player
(Brazil) Bruno Xavier
Best goalkeeper
(Brazil) Mão

== Final standings ==
Rank	Team	Result
1	Brazil	Champions
2	Paraguay	Runners-up
3	Venezuela	Third place
4	Uruguay	
5	Peru	
6	Chile	
7	Bolivia	
8	Colombia	
9	Ecuador	
10	Argentina	
