= Chile national beach soccer team =

Chile
- Nickname(s): La Roja (The Red One)
- Association: Federación de Fútbol de Chile (FFCh)
- Confederation: CONMEBOL (South America)
- Head coach: Eduardo Medalla
- FIFA code: CHI
- BSWW ranking: 31 ▲11 (9 April 2025)
First colours
Second colours

First international
- Brazil 8–2 Chile (Santos, Brazil; 3 December 1994)

Biggest win
- Chile 9–3 Colombia (Manta, Ecuador; 25 April 2015); Chile 10–4 Peru (Lambaré, Paraguay; 10 February 2017)

Biggest defeat
- Brazil 13–1 Chile (Asia, Peru; 6 March 2018)

World Cup
- Appearances: 1
- Best result: Group Stage (2025)

CONMEBOL Beach Soccer Championship
- Appearances: 5 (first in 2008)
- Best result: Group Stage (2008, 2009, 2011, 2013, 2015)

The Chile national beach soccer team represents Chile in international beach soccer competitions and is controlled by the FFC, the governing body for football in Chile. The team qualified for the first time to the FIFA Beach Soccer World Cup in 2025, after finishing third in the CONMEBOL qualifier.

== Current squad ==
Players called up for the 2025 Copa América of Beach Soccer

=== Goalkeepers ===
- Orlando Echeverría – Municipal Alto Hospicio (Chile)
- Pablo Rodríguez – Unión Morro (Chile)

=== Field players ===
- Sebastián Bolívar – Unión Morro (Chile)
- Diego Opazo – Bullers (Chile)
- Andrés Albuerno – Unión Morro (Chile)
- César Rama – Dragones de Chipana (Chile)
- Matías Araya – Bullers (Chile)
- Diego San Martín (captain) – Club 24 de Septiembre (Paraguay)
- Daniel Durán – Camba Pizzero FC (Chile)
- Gabriel Bacian – Cambia Pizzero FC (Chile)
- Héctor Tobar – Camba Pizzero FC (Chile)
- Javier Aguilera – Unión Morro (Chile)

== Current staff ==
- Manager: Miguel Ángel Gamboa
- Technical Assistant: Miguel Ángel Gamboa
- Head Delegation: Felipe Fernández

== Competitive record ==
=== FIFA Beach Soccer World Cup ===
FIFA World Cup record										Qualification (CONMEBOL) record (Note: In 2005 and 2007 merged qualification tournament with CONCACAF)								
Year	Round	Pos	Pld	W	W+	L	GF	GA	GD	Round	Pos	Pld	W	W+	L	GF	GA	GD
(Brazil) 2005	did not enter									did not enter								
(Brazil) 2006	did not enter									did not enter								
(Brazil) 2007	did not enter									did not enter								
(France) 2008	did not qualify									Group stage	5th	3	1	0	2	17	16	1
(United Arab Emirates) 2009	did not qualify									Group stage	–	3	2	0	1	13	13	0
(Italy) 2011	did not qualify									Group stage	7th	4	1	0	3	17	21	–4
(French Polynesia) 2013	did not qualify									Group stage	5th	5	2	1	2	26	25	+1
(Portugal) 2015	did not qualify									Group stage	7th	6	3	0	3	28	25	+3
(The Bahamas) 2017	did not qualify									Group stage	5th	6	3	0	3	35	31	+4
(Paraguay) 2019	did not qualify									Group stage	7th	5	2	0	3	21	24	-3
(Russia) 2021	did not qualify									Group stage	7th	5	2	0	3	15	10	+5
(United Arab Emirates) 2023	did not qualify									Group stage	6th	5	2	0	3	16	23	-7
(Seychelles) 2025	Group stage									Third place	3rd	6	4	0	2	19	17	+2
Total	0 titles	0	0	0	0	0	0	0	0	0 titles	10/13	48	22	1	25	207	205	+2

=== South American Games/Beach Games ===
Year	Result
(Argentina) Rosario 2019	Group stage (8th Place)
Total	0 titles

=== Bolivarian Beach Games ===
Year	Result
(Chile) Iquique 2016	3rd Place
Total	0 titles
