= Venezuela national beach soccer team =

National sports team

Venezuela
- Nickname(s): La Vinotinto (The Burgundy); Los Llaneros (The Plainsmen)
- Association: Venezuelan Football Federation
- Confederation: CONMEBOL (South America)
- Head coach: Roberto Cavallo
- FIFA code: VEN
- BSWW ranking: 24 (2 June 2025)
First colours
Second colours

Biggest defeat
- Brazil 16-1 Venezuela (Santa Marta, Colombia; 20 October 2018)

World Cup
- Appearances: 3 (first in 2000)
- Best result: Quarterfinals, (2000)

CONMEBOL Beach Soccer Championship
- Appearances: 6 (first in 2006)
- Best result: Third Place, (2011)

The Venezuela national beach soccer team represents Venezuela in international beach soccer competitions and is controlled by the FVF, the governing body for football in Venezuela.

== Current squad ==
Current as of August 2011.

Note: Flags indicate national team as defined under FIFA eligibility rules; some limited exceptions apply. Players may hold more than one non-FIFA nationality.

| No. | Pos. | Nation | Player |
|---|---|---|---|
| 1 | GK | | César Vazquez |
| 2 | DF | | Gian Luca Cardone |
| 3 | MF | | Jose Centeno |
| 4 | DF | | Ronald Pérez |
| 5 | DF | | Pablo Ferreira |
| 6 | MF | | Kevin Camargo |

| No. | Pos. | Nation | Player |
|---|---|---|---|
| 7 | DF | | Edgar Quintero |
| 8 | MF | | Francisco Landaeta |
| 9 | FW | | Marcos Monsalve |
| 10 | FW | | Pedro Romero |
| 11 | MF | | Carlos Longa |
| 12 | GK | | César Fermin |

== Current staff ==
- Manager: Roberto Cavallo
- Technical Assistant: Luis Moreno
- Head Delegation: Rafael Almarza

== Achievements ==
- FIFA Beach Soccer World Cup Best: Fifth place
  - 2000
- CONMEBOL Beach Soccer Championship Best: Third Place
  - 2011
