= Brazil national beach soccer team =

Brazil
- Nickname(s): Reis da Praia (Kings of the Beach); Canarinha (Little Canary); Verde e Amarela (Green and Yellow)
- Association: Brazilian Football Confederation
- Confederation: CONMEBOL (South America)
- Head coach: Marco Octávio
- Captain: Catarino
- Most caps: Mão (381)
- Top scorer: Neném (336)
- FIFA code: BRA
- BSWW ranking: 1 (2 September 2026)
First colours
Second colours

First international
- Brazil 10–3 United States (2 July 1993, Miami, United States)

Biggest win
- Brazil 23–3 Mexico (3 March 2005, Rio de Janeiro, Brazil)

Biggest defeat
- Brazil 4–9 Nigeria (18 December 2011, Lagos, Nigeria)

World Cup
- Appearances: 13 (first in 2005)
- Best result: (gold) Champions (7 titles) (2006, 2007, 2008, 2009, 2017, 2024, 2025)

World Championships
- Appearances: 10 (first in 1995)
- Best result: (gold) Champions (9 titles) (1995, 1996, 1997, 1998, 1999, 2000, 2002, 2003, 2004)

The Brazil national beach soccer team represents Brazil in international beach soccer competitions and is controlled by the CBF, the governing body for football in Brazil. Brazil is the most successful national team in the FIFA World Cup, being crowned winner a record seven times and having won the defunct World Championships also a record nine times. The Seleção also has the best overall performance in the World Cup competition, both in proportional and absolute terms. Portugal, Russia, Spain and Senegal are the only squads to have eliminated Brazil out of the World Cup. Brazil are ranked 1st in the BSWW World Rankings. They are, alongside Portugal, the only team to have won the world title before and after FIFA assumed the government of beach soccer worldwide. As of 2026, the Brazilian team has a winning record against every nation they've faced in their history, winning over 94% of the matches and losing 6% of then, both records in the history of beach soccer.

== Results and fixtures ==
The following is a list of match results in the last 12 months, as well as any future matches that have been scheduled.

Legend

Win Draw Lose Fixture

== Player records ==
=== Top goalscorers ===
As of 26 August 2021
*Players in bold are still active with Brazil.

| Rank | Player | Goals |
|---|---|---|
| 1 | Neném | 336 |
| 2 | Júnior Negão | 318 |
| 3 | Jorginho | 316 |
| 4 | Benjamin | 308 |
| 5 | André | 278 |
| 6 | Buru | 224 |
| 7 | Bruno Malias | 214 |
| 8 | Júnior | 202 |
| 8 | **Bruno Xavier** | 202 |
| 10 | Juninho | 153 |
| 10 | Sidney | 153 |
| 12 | **Rodrigo** | 146 |
| 13 | **Mauricinho** | 134 |
| 14 | Daniel Zidane | 127 |
| 15 | Magal | 123 |

== Competitive record ==
=== Beach Soccer World Championships (non-FIFA) ===
World Championships record
| Year | Round | Pos | Pld | W | W+ | L | GF | GA | GD |
|---|---|---|---|---|---|---|---|---|---|
| (Brazil) 1995 | Champions | 1st | 5 | 5 | 0 | 0 | 52 | 11 | +41 |
| (Brazil) 1996 | Champions | 1st | 5 | 5 | 0 | 0 | 39 | 9 | +30 |
| (Brazil) 1997 | Champions | 1st | 5 | 5 | 0 | 0 | 46 | 13 | +33 |
| (Brazil) 1998 | Champions | 1st | 5 | 5 | 0 | 0 | 52 | 9 | +43 |
| (Brazil) 1999 | Champions | 1st | 5 | 5 | 0 | 0 | 42 | 18 | +24 |
| (Brazil) 2000 | Champions | 1st | 5 | 5 | 0 | 0 | 42 | 16 | +26 |
| (Brazil) 2001 | Fourth place | 4th | 5 | 3 | 0 | 2 | 38 | 16 | +22 |
| (Brazil) 2002 | Champions | 1st | 5 | 5 | 0 | 0 | 31 | 13 | +18 |
| (Brazil) 2003 | Champions | 1st | 5 | 5 | 0 | 0 | 41 | 10 | +31 |
| (Brazil) 2004 | Champions | 1st | 5 | 5 | 0 | 0 | 42 | 10 | +32 |
| Total | 9 titles | 10/10 | 50 | 48 | 0 | 2 | 425 | 125 | +300 |

=== FIFA Beach Soccer World Cup ===
| FIFA World Cup record | | | | | | | | | | Qualification (CONMEBOL) record (Note: In 2005 and 2007 merged qualification tournament with CONCACAF) | | | | | | | | |
| Year | Round | Pos | Pld | W | W+ | L | GF | GA | GD | Round | Pos | Pld | W | W+ | L | GF | GA | GD |
|---|---|---|---|---|---|---|---|---|---|---|---|---|---|---|---|---|---|---|
| (Brazil) 2005 | **Third place** | **3rd** | **5** | **4** | **0** | **1** | **39** | **14** | **+25** | Automatically qualified as hosts | | | | | | | | |
| (Brazil) 2006 | **Champions** | **1st** | **6** | **6** | **0** | **0** | **52** | **16** | **+36** | Champions | 1st | 7 | 7 | 0 | 0 | 71 | 15 | +56 |
| (Brazil) 2007 | **Champions** | **1st** | **6** | **5** | **1** | **0** | **43** | **19** | **+24** | Automatically qualified as hosts | | | | | | | | |
| (France) 2008 | **Champions** | **1st** | **6** | **6** | **0** | **0** | **34** | **15** | **+19** | Champions | 1st | 4 | 4 | 0 | 0 | 28 | 11 | +17 |
| (United Arab Emirates) 2009 | **Champions** | **1st** | **6** | **6** | **0** | **0** | **47** | **19** | **+28** | Champions | 1st | 5 | 5 | 0 | 0 | 39 | 6 | +33 |
| (Italy) 2011 | **Runners-up** | **2nd** | **6** | **4** | **1** | **1** | **32** | **28** | **+4** | Champions | 1st | 5 | 5 | 0 | 0 | 39 | 6 | +33 |
| (French Polynesia) 2013 | **Third place** | **3rd** | **6** | **4** | **1** | **1** | **25** | **14** | **+11** | Third place | 3rd | 5 | 4 | 0 | 1 | 61 | 23 | +38 |
| (Portugal) 2015 | Quarterfinals | 5th | 4 | 3 | 0 | 1 | 16 | 11 | +5 | Champions | 1st | 6 | 5 | 0 | 1 | 48 | 18 | +30 |
| (The Bahamas) 2017 | **Champions** | **1st** | **6** | **6** | **0** | **0** | **38** | **15** | **+23** | Champions | 1st | 6 | 6 | 0 | 0 | 51 | 14 | +37 |
| (Paraguay) 2019 | Quarterfinals | 5th | 4 | 3 | 0 | 1 | 32 | 15 | +17 | Champions | 1st | 6 | 6 | 0 | 0 | 59 | 13 | +46 |
| (Russia) 2021 | Quarterfinals | 5th | 4 | 2 | 0 | 2 | 18 | 12 | +6 | Champions | 1st | 6 | 6 | 0 | 0 | 35 | 13 | +22 |
| (United Arab Emirates) 2024 | **Champions** | **1st** | **6** | **4** | **2** | **0** | **29** | **18** | **+11** | Champions | 1st | 6 | 6 | 0 | 0 | 55 | 16 | +39 |
| (Seychelles) 2025 | **Champions** | **1st** | **6** | **6** | **0** | **0** | **30** | **8** | **+22** | Champions | 1st | 6 | 5 | 0 | 1 | 41 | 22 | +19 |
| Total | 13/13 | 1st | 71 | 59 | 5 | 7 | 435 | 204 | +231 | | | | | | | | | |

== Honours ==
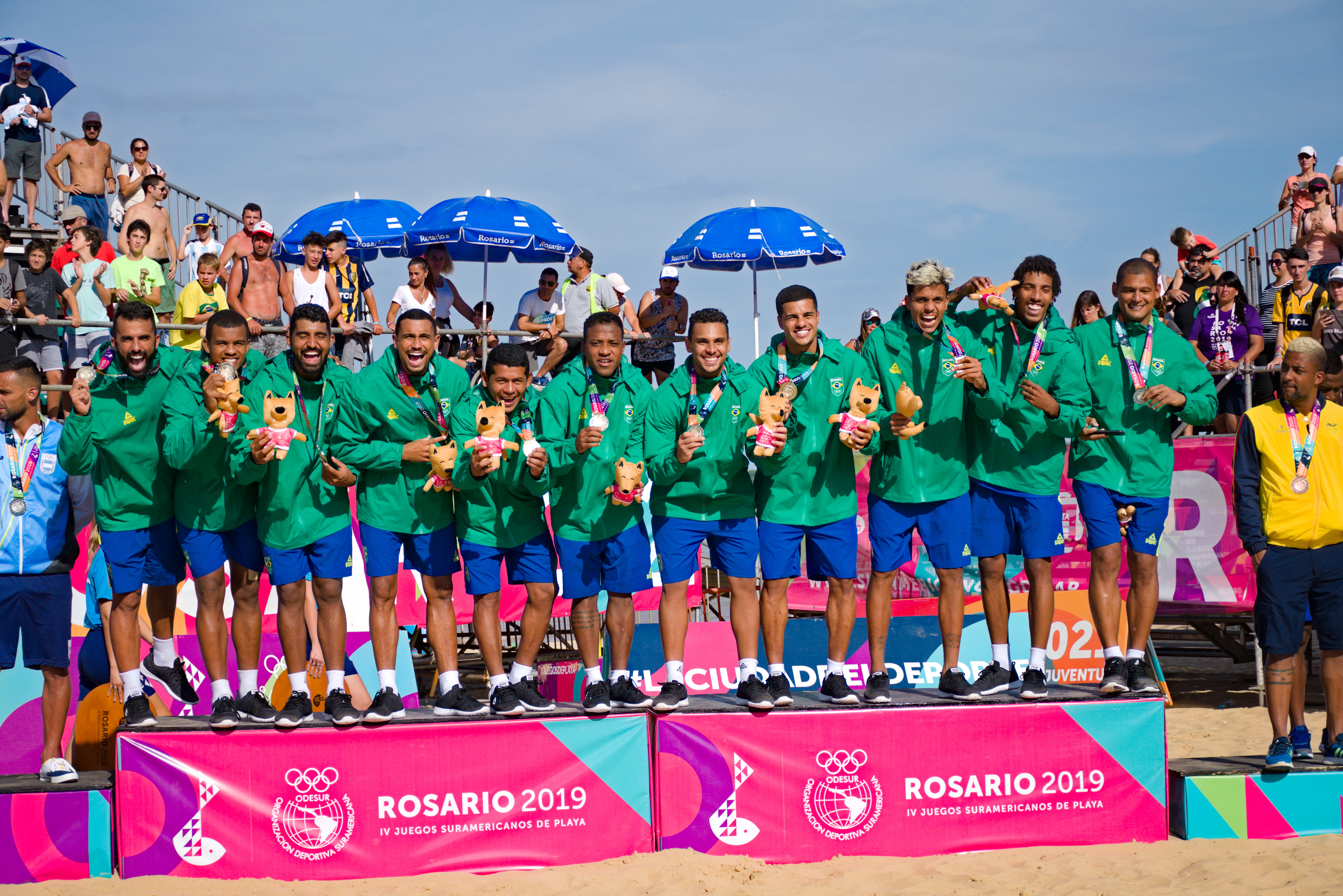
The Brazil team at the medals ceremony of the 2019 South American Beach Games.

- **FIFA Beach Soccer World Cup**
  - Winners (7): 2006, 2007, 2008, 2009, 2017, 2024, 2025
- **Beach Soccer World Championships**
  - Winners (9): 1995, 1996, 1997, 1998, 1999, 2000, 2002, 2003, 2004
- **Mundialito**
  - Winners (15): 1994, 1997, 1999, 2000, 2001, 2002, 2004, 2005, 2006, 2007, 2010, 2011, 2016, 2017, 2023
- **Beach Soccer Intercontinental Cup**
  - Winner (3): 2014, 2016, 2017
- **Copa América of Beach Soccer**
  - Winners (4): 2016, 2018, 2023, 2025
- **CONMEBOL Beach Soccer Championship**
  - Winners (8): 2006, 2008, 2009, 2011, 2015, 2017, 2019, 2021
- **CONCACAF and CONMEBOL Beach Soccer Championship**
  - Winner (1): 2005
- **CONMEBOL South American Beach Soccer League**
  - Winners (4): 2017, 2018, 2019, 2022
- **Copa Latina**
  - Winners (9): 1998, 1999, 2001, 2002, 2003, 2004, 2005, 2006, 2009
