= 2018 South American Beach Soccer League =

2018 CONMEBOL South American Beach Soccer League
Liga Sudamericana de Fútbol Playa 2018
- Map showing the locations of the events of the 2018 season

Tournament details
- Host countries: Colombia; Bolivia; Paraguay
- Dates: Regular season: 17 October – 3 November 2018; Finals: 14–16 March 2019
- Teams: 20 (from 1 confederation)
- Venue(s): 3 (in 3 host cities)

Final positions
- Champions: Brazil (2nd title)
- Runners-up: Paraguay

Tournament statistics
- Matches played: 44
- Goals scored: 410 (9.32 per match)

The 2018 CONMEBOL South American Beach Soccer League was the second edition of the South American Beach Soccer League (named natively in Spanish as the CONMEBOL Liga Sudamericana de Fútbol Playa), a continental league competition for South American men's national beach soccer teams.

Organised by the governing body for South American football, CONMEBOL, as part of its Development Department's Evolution Program, all ten members of the continental confederation took part, with both senior and under 20s national teams participating in the league events.

The teams were first divided into two geographically based zones (North and South) to compete in a round robin tournament against other members of their own zone during the regular season; the points earned by both the senior and under 20s teams are combined. The winners of each zone then proceeded to face each other in the finals to contest the title.

Brazil were the defending champions and successfully defended their title, defeating Paraguay in what was a repeat of the finals of the previous edition.

== Format ==
The league operates under the same format established for the inaugural season.

== Calendar ==
| Phase | Dates | Country | City | Event | Zone | |
|---|---|---|---|---|---|---|
| Regular season | 17–21 October 2018 | Colombia | Santa Marta | North zone | N | |
| Regular season | 30 October – 3 November 2018 | Bolivia | Santa Cruz | South zone | | S |
| Finals | 14–16 March 2019 | Paraguay | Encarnación | Finals | N | S |

== Teams ==
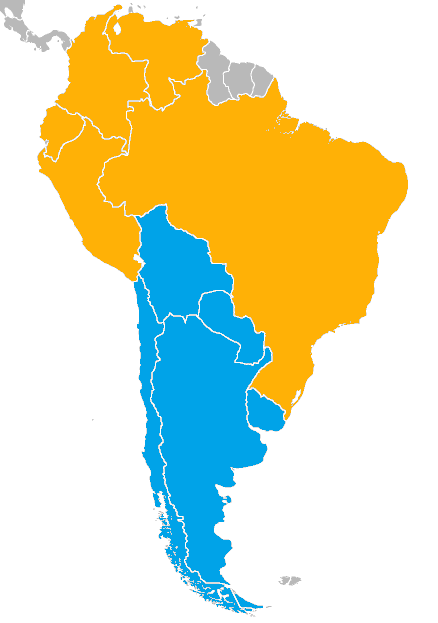
Nations in the North zone Nations in the South zone Not a member of CONMEBOL

The ten member nations of CONMEBOL enter two teams each: their respective senior and under 20s national teams. In total, 20 teams will compete.

The numbers in parentheses show the South American ranking of each team prior to the start of the season (rankings only apply to the senior teams).

=== North zone ===
- Brazil (1st)
- Colombia (9th)
- Ecuador (3rd)
- Peru (7th)
- Venezuela (8th)
- Brazil U20s
- Colombia U20s
- Ecuador U20s
- Peru U20s
- Venezuela U20s

=== South zone ===
- Argentina (4th)
- Bolivia (10th)
- Chile (5th)
- Paraguay (2nd)
- Uruguay (6th)
- Argentina U20s
- Bolivia U20s
- Chile U20s
- Paraguay U20s
- Uruguay U20s

== North zone ==
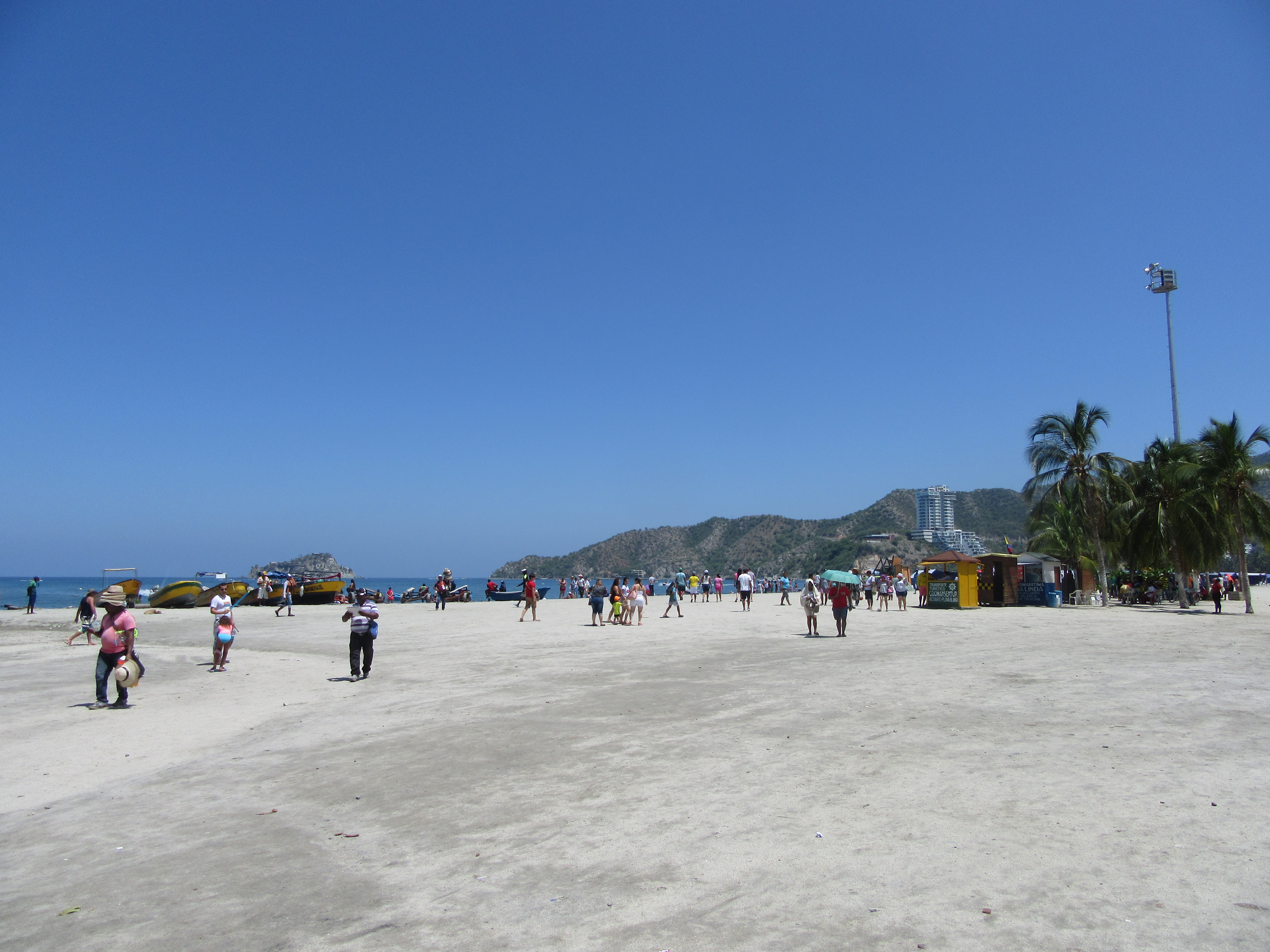
El Rodadero beach in Santa Marta, the venue of the North zone event

The North zone regular season event took place just outside of the Colombian city of Santa Marta. All matches were hosted in a purpose built arena on the beach of El Rodadero resort with a capacity of 1,500, in the town of Gaira, organised in cooperation with the Colombian Football Federation.

The match schedule was announced on 10 October.

The event was attended by a total of 12,500 people (avg. of 625 per match).

Matches are listed as local time in Santa Marta, COL (UTC-5).

=== Standings ===
| Key: | Advance to the finals / | (H) | Hosts |

| Pos | Team | Pld | W | W+ | WP | L | GF | GA | GD | Pts |
|---|---|---|---|---|---|---|---|---|---|---|
| 1 | Team Brazil | 8 | 8 | 0 | 0 | 0 | 65 | 21 | +44 | 24 |
| 2 | Team Colombia (H) | 8 | 4 | 0 | 1 | 3 | 37 | 37 | 0 | 13 |
| 3 | Team Venezuela | 8 | 2 | 1 | 0 | 5 | 25 | 47 | –22 | 8 |
| 4 | Team Peru | 8 | 2 | 0 | 0 | 6 | 27 | 34 | –7 | 6 |
| 5 | Team Ecuador | 8 | 2 | 0 | 0 | 6 | 27 | 42 | –15 | 6 |

=== Results ===
==== Senior category ====
| 17 October 2018 | Brazil | 8–1 | Peru |
| 11:00 | | Report |

| 17 October 2018 | Colombia | 6–7 | Ecuador |
| 16:30 | | Report |

| 18 October 2018 | Ecuador | 2–12 | Peru |
| 11:00 | | Report |

| 18 October 2018 | Colombia | 4–1 | Venezuela |
| 16:30 | | Report |

| 19 October 2018 | Peru | 4–5 | Venezuela |
| 11:00 | | Report |

| 19 October 2018 | Brazil | 8–4 | Ecuador |
| 16:30 | | Report |

| 20 October 2018 | Venezuela | 1–16 | Brazil |
| 11:00 | | Report |

| 20 October 2018 | Colombia | 5–2 | Peru |
| 16:30 | | Report |

| 21 October 2018 | Ecuador | 5–7 (a.e.t.) | Venezuela |
| 11:00 | | Report |

| 21 October 2018 | Colombia | 5–13 | Brazil |
| 16:30 | | Report |

==== Under 20s category ====
| 17 October 2018 | Brazil U20s | 5–3 | Peru U20s |
| 09:30 | | Report |

| 17 October 2018 | Colombia U20s | 4–4 (a.e.t.) (2–0 p) | Ecuador U20s |
| 15:00 | | Report |

| 18 October 2018 | Ecuador U20s | 0–1 | Peru U20s |
| 09:30 | | Report |

| 18 October 2018 | Colombia U20s | 6–4 | Venezuela U20s |
| 15:00 | | Report |

| 19 October 2018 | Peru U20s | 1–3 | Venezuela U20s |
| 09:30 | | Report |

| 19 October 2018 | Brazil U20s | 4–2 | Ecuador U20s |
| 15:00 | | Report |

| 20 October 2018 | Venezuela U20s | 4–8 | Brazil U20s |
| 09:30 | | Report |

| 20 October 2018 | Colombia U20s | 6–3 | Peru U20s |
| 15:00 | | Report |

| 21 October 2018 | Ecuador U20s | 3–0 | Venezuela U20s |
| 09:30 | | Report |

| 21 October 2018 | Colombia U20s | 1–3 | Brazil U20s |
| 15:00 | | Report |

== South zone ==
The South zone regular season event took place in the largest city of Bolivia, Santa Cruz, in cooperation with the Bolivian Football Federation. All matches took place at a purpose built stadium at Villa Olimpica Abraham Telchi.

The match schedule was announced on 26 October.

Matches are listed as local time in Santa Cruz, BOL (UTC-4).

=== Standings ===
| Key: | Advance to the finals / | (H) | Hosts |

| Pos | Team | Pld | W | W+ | WP | L | GF | GA | GD | Pts |
|---|---|---|---|---|---|---|---|---|---|---|
| 1 | Team Paraguay | 8 | 6 | 0 | 0 | 2 | 54 | 44 | +10 | 18 |
| 2 | Team Uruguay | 8 | 4 | 0 | 1 | 3 | 40 | 34 | +6 | 13 |
| 3 | Team Argentina | 8 | 4 | 0 | 1 | 3 | 37 | 32 | +5 | 13 |
| 4 | Team Chile | 8 | 2 | 0 | 0 | 6 | 39 | 45 | –6 | 6 |
| 5 | Team Bolivia (H) | 8 | 1 | 0 | 1 | 6 | 31 | 46 | –15 | 4 |

=== Results ===
==== Senior category ====
| 30 October 2018 | Argentina | 4–5 | Uruguay |
| 19:20 | | Report |

| 30 October 2018 | Bolivia | 3–4 | Paraguay |
| 20:40 | | Report |

| 31 October 2018 | Chile | 3–4 | Argentina |
| 17:30 | | Report |

| 31 October 2018 | Bolivia | 3–5 | Uruguay |
| 20:30 | | Report |

| 1 November 2018 | Uruguay | 6–5 | Chile |
| 17:30 | | Report |

| 1 November 2018 | Paraguay | 7–6 | Argentina |
| 20:30 | | Report |

| 2 November 2018 | Paraguay | 4–10 | Uruguay |
| 17:30 | | Report |

| 2 November 2018 | Bolivia | 3–5 | Chile |
| 20:30 | | Report |

| 3 November 2018 | Chile | 7–8 | Paraguay |
| 16:30 | | Report |

| 3 November 2018 | Bolivia | 3–8 | Argentina |
| 19:30 | | Report |

==== Under 20s category ====
| 30 October 2018 | Argentina U20s | 2–2 (a.e.t.) (3–1 p) | Uruguay U20s |
| 16:00 | | Report |

| 30 October 2018 | Bolivia U20s | 4–9 | Paraguay U20s |
| 17:20 | | Report |

| 31 October 2018 | Chile U20s | 2–5 | Argentina U20s |
| 16:00 | | Report |

| 31 October 2018 | Bolivia U20s | 5–3 | Uruguay U20s |
| 19:00 | | Report |

| 1 November 2018 | Uruguay U20s | 3–5 | Chile U20s |
| 16:00 | | Report |

| 1 November 2018 | Paraguay U20s | 7–3 | Argentina U20s |
| 19:00 | | Report |

| 2 November 2018 | Paraguay U20s | 6–6 (a.e.t.) (1–3 p) | Uruguay U20s |
| 16:00 | | Report |

| 2 November 2018 | Bolivia U20s | 7–7 (a.e.t.) (3–2 p) | Chile U20s |
| 19:00 | | Report |

| 3 November 2018 | Chile U20s | 5–9 | Paraguay U20s |
| 15:00 | | Report |

| 3 November 2018 | Bolivia U20s | 3–5 | Argentina U20s |
| 18:00 | | Report |

== Finals ==
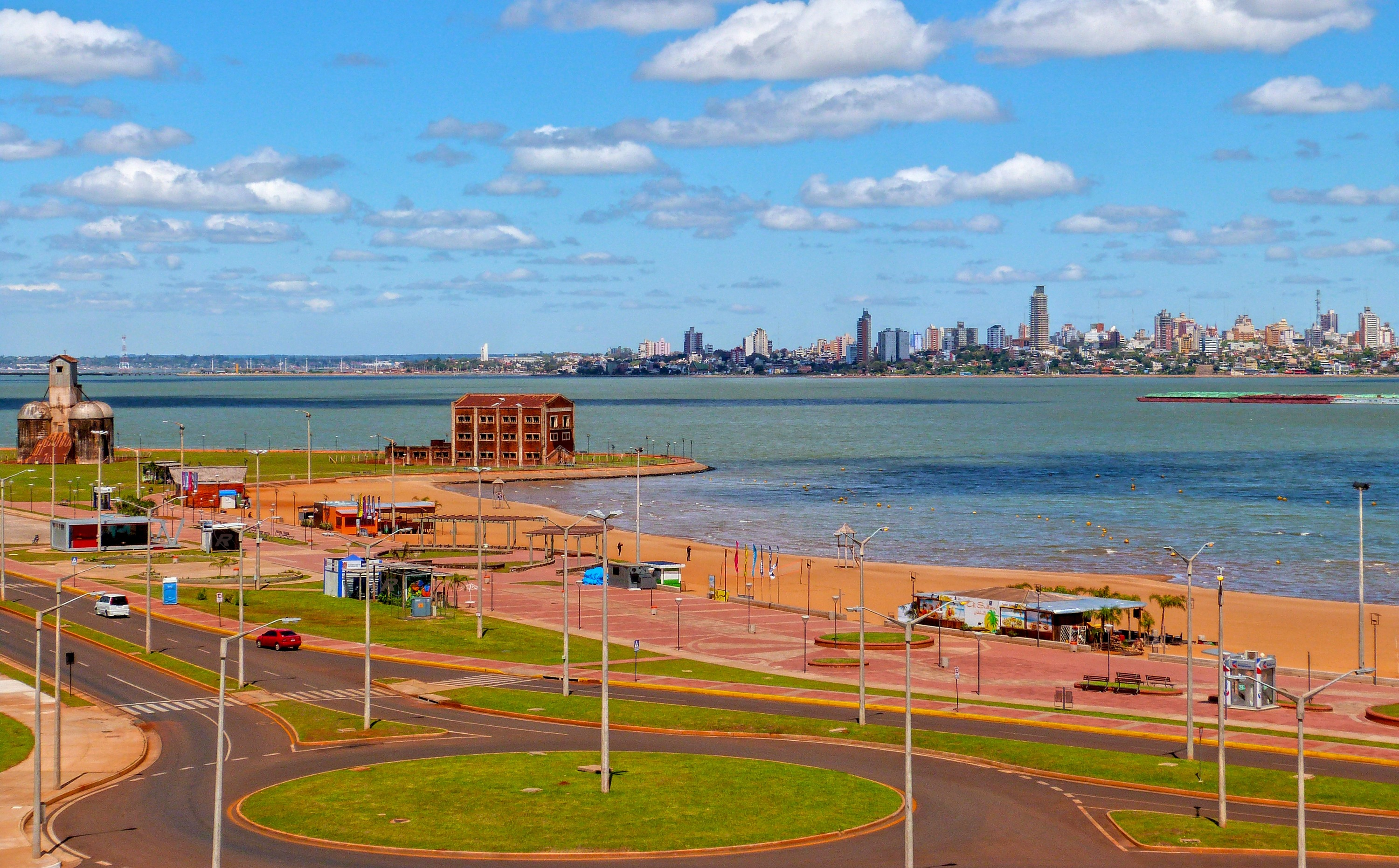
San José Beach in Encarnación

The zone winners play each other for the league title; their senior teams play each other over two legs, as do their under 20s representatives for a total of four matches comprising the finals. The winners are the nation which accumulates the most points from all four matches combined.

The finals were organised to take place in Encarnación, Paraguay from 14–16 March 2019, in cooperation with the Paraguayan Football Association.

All matches took place at the Arena Playa de San José adjacent to San José Beach.

Matches are listed as local time in Encarnación, PYST (UTC-3).

=== Matches ===
14 March 2019
19:00

| Paraguay U20s | 2–1 | Brazil U20s |
|---|---|---|
| Areco; C. Benítez | Report | Paulinho |

Paraguay earn three points; Paraguay lead the series 3–0.

14 March 2019
20:30

| Paraguay | 5–6 | Brazil |
|---|---|---|
| Carballo; Barreto; A. Rolón | Report | Mauricinho; Rafa Padilha; Datinha; Bruno Xavier |

Brazil earn three points; series tied at 3–3.

16 March 2019
19:00

| Paraguay U20s | 5–3 | Brazil U20s |
|---|---|---|
| J. Benítez; Medina; C. Benítez | Report | Alejandro; Thales; Lucas Xavier |

Paraguay earn three points; Paraguay lead the series 6–3.

16 March 2019
20:30

| Paraguay | 2–4 | Brazil |
|---|---|---|
| Barreto | Report | Bruno Xavier; Thales; Rodrigo |

Brazil earn three points; series tied at 6–6.

==== Tiebreaker ====
With the series tied after all four matches were complete, a penalty shootout was contested by the senior teams to decide the winners.

16 March 2019
21:45

| Paraguay | v | Brazil |
|---|---|---|
| | Replay |
Penalties
| Carballo (penalty scored); Barreto (penalty missed) | 1–3 | (penalty scored) Bruno Xavier; (penalty scored) Filipe; (penalty scored) Antônio |

Brazil earn one point; Brazil win the series 7–6.

=== Winners ===
Brazil won the league to claim back-to-back titles.

2018 South American Beach Soccer League
champions

Brazil
Second title
