= South American Beach Soccer League =

CONMEBOL Evolution Beach Soccer League
- Organising body: CONMEBOL
- Founded: 2017; 8 years ago
- Confederation: CONMEBOL (South America)
- Conferences: North zone South zone
- Number of clubs: 20
- Current champions: Paraguay (2nd title) (2023)
- Most championships: Brazil (4 titles)
- Current: 2024 South American Beach Soccer League

The CONMEBOL Evolution Beach Soccer League, named natively in Spanish as the CONMEBOL Liga Evolución de Fútbol Playa, is a continental league competition for South American men's national beach soccer teams.

The competition is organized by the governing body for South American football, CONMEBOL, who started the league in 2017 as part of its Development Department's Evolution Program. All ten members of the continental confederation take part in the league, with both senior and under 20s teams representing each nation; therefore, a total of 20 teams participate.

The league consists of two phases: the regular season and the finals. The teams are first divided into two geographically based conferences, the North zone and South zone, to compete in a round robin tournament against the other members of their own zone during the regular season. The points of the seniors and under 20s teams are combined to determine the winners of each conference. The winners of each zone then proceed to face each other in the finals to contest the league title.

Paraguay is the current title holder.

== Competition structure ==
The league operates under the following format:

=== Zones & teams ===
- The ten member nations of CONMEBOL have been split into two conferences based on their geographic location in South America: a North zone and a South zone, comprising five nations each.
- Each nation is represented by two teams: their senior national team and their under 20s national team. Therefore, a total of 20 teams take part.

=== Regular season ===
- During the regular season, each zone hosts its own tournament involving all five nations of said zone, taking place in one of the five countries of the zone in question over the course of five days.
- The fixtures are split into two categories of matches; a set of matches contested between the senior representative teams and a set of matches contested between the Under 20s teams.
- Teams compete in a round robin format exclusively against the other four teams in their own category.
- Points earned by the nations in both the senior and the under 20s matches are combined into one single cumulative table.
- The nation top of the table with the most points after all matches are completed are deemed zone champions; the winning nations of each zone event proceed to the finals.

=== Finals ===
- In the finals, the North zone champion faces the South zone champion; their senior teams play each other over two legs, as do their under 20s representatives for a total of four matches.
- The event takes place over two days. The first leg of the senior and under 20s ties take place on day one and the second legs, on day two.
- The nation which accumulates the most points from all four matches combined will be crowned league champions.
- If the teams are level on points after the four matches are complete, a tie-breaking penalty shootout is contested to decide the winners.

== Conferences ==
The current allocation of the ten member nations of CONMEBOL into the North zone and the South zone is as follows:

The composition of the zones has been the same in the four editions to date, save for 2019.

North zone	Not a member of CONMEBOL	South zone
Brazil (Note: Previously a member of the South zone (2019).); Colombia; Ecuador; Peru; Venezuela	Not a member of CONMEBOL	Argentina; Bolivia; Chile; Paraguay (Note: Previously a member of the North zone (2019).); Uruguay

== Results ==
The following shows the results of the finals in which the regular season champions of the respective zones play against each other for the league title. The nation that earns the most points from the four matches that comprise the finals, wins the league.

The league did not take place at all in 2020 or 2021 due to the effects of the COVID-19 pandemic in South America.

- North zone champion
- South zone champion

Season	Host	Result			Matches		
Season	Host	Winners	Points	Runners-up	Category	First leg	Second leg
2017 details	Rio de Janeiro, Brazil	Brazil	12 – 0	Paraguay	Under 20s	(Brazil) win 6–2 (+3pts Brazil)	(Brazil) win 5–4 (+3pts Brazil)
2017 details	Rio de Janeiro, Brazil	Brazil	12 – 0	Paraguay	Senior	(Brazil) win 7–4 (+3pts Brazil)	(Brazil) win 6–1 (+3pts Brazil)
2018 details	Encarnación, Paraguay	Brazil	7 – 6^{[A]}	Paraguay	Under 20s	(Paraguay) win 2–1 (+3pts Paraguay)	(Paraguay) win 5–3 (+3pts Paraguay)
2018 details	Encarnación, Paraguay	Brazil	7 – 6^{[A]}	Paraguay	Senior	(Brazil) win 6–5 (+3pts Brazil)	(Brazil) win 4–2 (+3pts Brazil)
2019 details	Playas, Ecuador	Brazil	12 – 0	Ecuador	Under 20s	(Brazil) win 5–3 (+3pts Brazil)	(Brazil) win 4–3 (+3pts Brazil)
2019 details	Playas, Ecuador	Brazil	12 – 0	Ecuador	Senior	(Brazil) win 11–5 (+3pts Brazil)	(Brazil) win 13–4 (+3pts Brazil)
2022 details	Santa Fe, Argentina	Brazil	Abandoned; title shared.^{[B]}	—	Under 20s	(Brazil) win 5–4 (+3pts Brazil)	(Paraguay) win 4–2 (+3pts Paraguay)
2022 details	Santa Fe, Argentina	Paraguay	Abandoned; title shared.^{[B]}	—	Senior	(Brazil) win 6–2 (+3pts Brazil)	Cancelled^{[B]}
2023 details	São Luís, Brazil	Paraguay	6 – 3	Brazil	Under 20s	(Brazil) win 6–3 (+3pts Brazil)	(Paraguay) win 5–3 (+3pts Paraguay)
2023 details	São Luís, Brazil	Paraguay	6 – 3	Brazil	Senior	Cancelled^{[C]}	(Paraguay) win 5–4 (+3pts Paraguay)

Notes:

A. With the series tied at 6–6 after all four matches were complete, a penalty shootout was contested to decide the winners. Brazil won 3–1 (+1pt Brazil).
B. After three matches of the finals, both teams were still in contention to win the title. However, the fourth and decisive match of the finals could not be played due to adverse weather conditions and was cancelled. Thus, CONMEBOL made the decision to share the title between both Brazil and Paraguay.
C. The second match of the finals could not be played due to adverse weather conditions and was cancelled. Consequently, the champions were defined taking into account only the points accumulated in three matches.

== Statistics ==
=== All-time tables ===
Key: Won in normal time W = 3 points / Won in extra-time W+ = 2 points / Won on penalty shoot-out WP = 1 point / Lost L = 0 points / Points per game PPG

As of the 2023 finals.

==== Combined results ====
Pos	Team	Pld	W	W+	WP	L	GF	GA	GD	Pts	PPG	Win %
1	Team Brazil	58	50	1	0	7	365	164	+201	152	2.62	89.4 (51–7)
2	Team Paraguay	54	37	0	1	16	290	203	+87	112	2.07	70.4 (38–16)
3	Team Argentina	40	21	1	2	16	165	137	+28	67	1.67	60.0 (24–16)
4	Team Ecuador	44	20	1	1	22	177	201	–24	63	1.43	50.0 (22–22)
5	Team Uruguay	40	15	0	4	21	159	157	+2	49	1.23	47.5 (19–21)
6	Team Colombia	40	14	0	2	24	152	177	–25	44	1.10	40.0 (16–24)
7	Team Chile	40	12	0	0	28	166	199	–33	36	0.90	30.0 (12–28)
8	Team Peru	40	8	1	4	27	147	200	–53	30	0.75	32.5 (13–27)
9	Team Venezuela	40	8	1	4	27	132	189	–57	30	0.75	32.5 (13–27)
10	Team Bolivia	40	6	0	4	30	116	242	–126	22	0.55	30.0 (10–30)

==== Seniors ====
Pos	Team	Pld	W	W+	WP	L	GF	GA	GD	Pts	PPG	Win %
1	Brazil	28	27	0	0	1	206	78	+128	81	2.89	96.4 (27–1)
2	Paraguay	26	17	0	0	9	130	107	+23	51	1.96	65.4 (17–9)
3	Argentina	20	10	1	1	8	83	65	+18	33	1.65	60.0 (12–8)
4	Ecuador	22	10	1	1	10	96	123	–27	33	1.50	54.5 (12–10)
5	Uruguay	20	8	0	3	9	81	78	+3	27	1.35	55.0 (11–9)
6	Colombia	20	6	0	1	13	77	97	–20	19	0.95	35.0 (7–13)
7	Chile	20	6	0	0	14	80	89	–9	18	0.90	30.0 (6–14)
8	Peru	20	4	1	2	13	82	96	–14	16	0.80	35.0 (7–13)
9	Venezuela	20	2	1	2	15	64	103	–39	10	0.50	25.0 (5–15)
10	Bolivia	20	3	0	1	16	49	112	–63	10	0.50	20.0 (4–16)

==== Under 20s ====
Pos	Team	Pld	W	W+	WP	L	GF	GA	GD	Pts	PPG	Win %
1	Brazil U20s	30	23	1	0	6	159	86	+73	71	2.37	80.0 (24–6)
2	Paraguay U20s	28	20	0	1	7	160	96	+64	61	2.18	75.0 (21–7)
3	Argentina U20s	20	11	0	1	8	82	72	+10	34	1.70	60.0 (12–8)
4	Ecuador U20s	22	10	0	0	12	81	78	+3	30	1.36	45.5 (10–12)
5	Colombia U20s	20	8	0	1	11	75	80	–5	25	1.25	45.0 (9–11)
6	Uruguay U20s	20	7	0	1	12	78	79	–1	22	1.10	40.0 (8–12)
7	Venezuela U20s	20	6	0	2	12	68	86	–18	20	1.00	40.0 (8–12)
8	Chile U20s	20	6	0	0	14	86	110	–24	18	0.90	30.0 (6–14)
9	Peru U20s	20	4	0	2	14	65	104	–39	14	0.70	30.0 (6–14)
10	Bolivia U20s	20	3	0	3	14	67	130	–63	12	0.60	30.0 (6–14)

== See also ==
- South American Futsal League
