= 2019 South American Beach Soccer League =

2019 CONMEBOL South American Beach Soccer League
Liga Sudamericana de Fútbol Playa 2019
- Map showing the locations of the events of the 2019 season.

Tournament details
- Host countries: Argentina; Ecuador
- Dates: Regular season: 4 September – 5 October 2019; Finals: 7–8 May 2022
- Teams: 20 (from 1 confederation)
- Venue(s): 3 (in 3 host cities)

Final positions
- Champions: Brazil (3rd title)
- Runners-up: Ecuador

Tournament statistics
- Matches played: 44
- Goals scored: 443 (10.07 per match)

The 2019 CONMEBOL South American Beach Soccer League was the third edition of the South American Beach Soccer League (named natively in Spanish as the CONMEBOL Liga Sudamericana de Fútbol Playa), a continental league competition for South American men's national beach soccer teams.

Organised by the governing body for South American football, CONMEBOL, as part of its Development Department's Evolution Program, all ten members of the continental confederation took part, with both senior and under 20s national teams participating in the league events.

The teams were first divided into two geographically based zones (North and South) to compete in a round robin tournament against other members of their own zone during the regular season; the points earned by both the senior and under 20s teams were combined. This season, the make-up of the zones was changed for the first time. The winners of each zone then proceeded to face each other in the finals to contest the title, scheduled for early 2020. However, due to the outbreak of the COVID-19 pandemic, the finals did not take place for over two and a half years, until May 2022.

Brazil were the two-time defending champions and successfully retained the title once more, defeating Ecuador in the finals.

== Format ==
The league operated under the same format established for the inaugural season.

== Calendar ==
The north and south zone event calendar was revealed on 7 August 2019. The finals were confirmed on 5 May 2022.

Phase	Dates	Country	City	Event	Zone	
Regular season	4–8 September 2019	Argentina	Rosario	South zone		S
Regular season	1–5 October 2019	Ecuador	Manta	North zone	N	
Finals	7–8 May 2022	Ecuador	Playas	Finals	N	S

== Teams ==
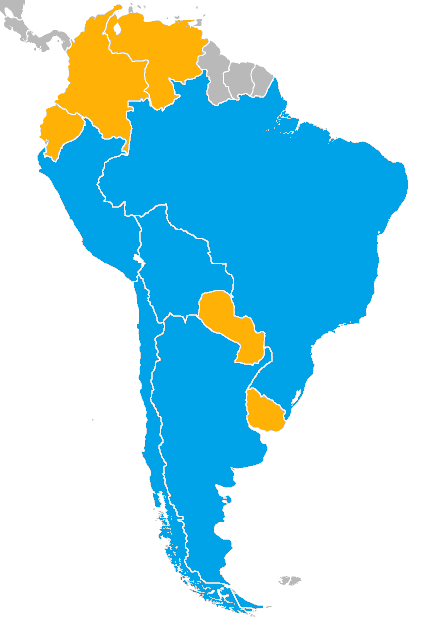
Zone composition of the 2019 SABSL Nations in the North zone Nations in the South zone Not a member of CONMEBOL

The ten member nations of CONMEBOL entered two teams each: their respective senior and under 20s national teams. In total, 20 teams competed.

For this season, CONMEBOL altered the existing composition of the two zones, deciding that Brazil and Peru of the north zone and Paraguay and Uruguay of the south zone, would swap conferences. (This effectively made Paraguay and Uruguay exclaves of the north zone as they are only bordered by nations of the south).

The numbers in parentheses show the South American ranking of each team prior to the start of the season (rankings only apply to the senior teams).

=== North zone ===
- Colombia (6th)
- Ecuador (5th)
- Paraguay (2nd)
- Uruguay (3rd)
- Venezuela (9th)
- Colombia U20s
- Ecuador U20s
- Paraguay U20s
- Uruguay U20s
- Venezuela U20s

=== South zone ===
- Argentina (4th)
- Brazil (1st)
- Bolivia (10th)
- Chile (8th)
- Peru (7th)
- Argentina U20s
- Brazil U20s
- Bolivia U20s
- Chile U20s
- Peru U20s

== South zone ==
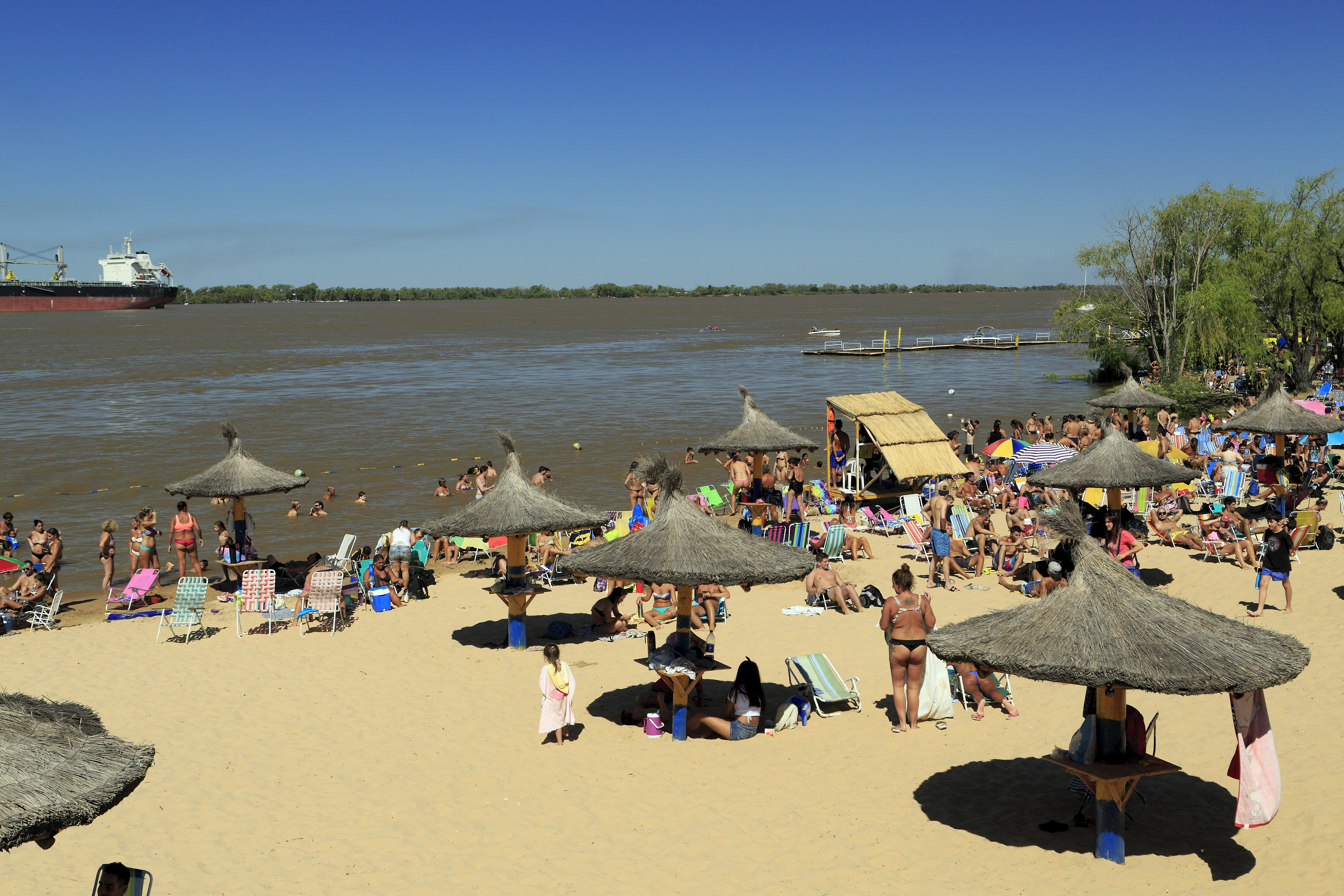
The Paraná River at Caribe Canalla

The South zone regular season took place in the Argentinian city of Rosario. All matches were hosted at the "Ángel Di María" beach soccer field, part of the Caribe Canalla sports and recreation complex on the banks of the Paraná River, home to Rosario Central Beach Soccer Club. Stands were installed with a capacity of 600.

The event was organised in cooperation with the Argentine Football Association (AFA) and the Rosarina Football Association (ARF).

The schedule was announced on 2 September.

Matches are listed as local time in Rosario, ART (UTC−3).

=== Standings ===
Key:	Advance to the finals /	(H)	Hosts

Pos	Team	Pld	W	W+	WP	L	GF	GA	GD	Pts
1	Team Brazil	8	7	0	0	1	60	27	+33	21
2	Team Argentina (H)	8	6	1	0	1	51	30	+21	20
3	Team Peru	8	3	0	0	5	41	44	–3	9
4	Team Chile	8	3	0	0	5	40	48	–8	9
5	Team Bolivia	8	0	0	0	8	28	71	–43	0

=== Results ===
==== Senior category ====
4 September 2019	Brazil	7–3	Peru
13:00		Report

4 September 2019	Argentina	10–3	Bolivia
16:30		Report

5 September 2019	Bolivia	4–10	Brazil
13:00		Report

5 September 2019	Argentina	5–4 (a.e.t.)	Chile
16:30		Report

6 September 2019	Chile	6–1	Bolivia
13:00		Report

6 September 2019	Argentina	4–3	Peru
16:30		Report

7 September 2019	Peru	9–2	Bolivia
13:00		Report

7 September 2019	Brazil	8–5	Chile
16:30		Report

8 September 2019	Peru	4–8	Chile
13:00		Report

8 September 2019	Argentina	3–6	Brazil
16:30		Report

==== Under 20s category ====
4 September 2019	Brazil U20s	6–2	Peru U20s
11:30		Report

4 September 2019	Argentina U20s	7–5	Bolivia U20s
15:00		Report

5 September 2019	Bolivia U20s	2–11	Brazil U20s
11:30		Report

5 September 2019	Argentina U20s	11–2	Chile U20s
15:00		Report

6 September 2019	Chile U20s	7–5	Bolivia U20s
11:30		Report

6 September 2019	Argentina U20s	6–3	Peru U20s
15:00		Report

7 September 2019	Peru U20s	11–6	Bolivia U20s
11:30		Report

7 September 2019	Brazil U20s	8–3	Chile U20s
15:00		Report

8 September 2019	Peru U20s	6–5	Chile U20s
11:30		Report

8 September 2019	Argentina U20s	5–4	Brazil U20s
15:00		Report

== North zone ==
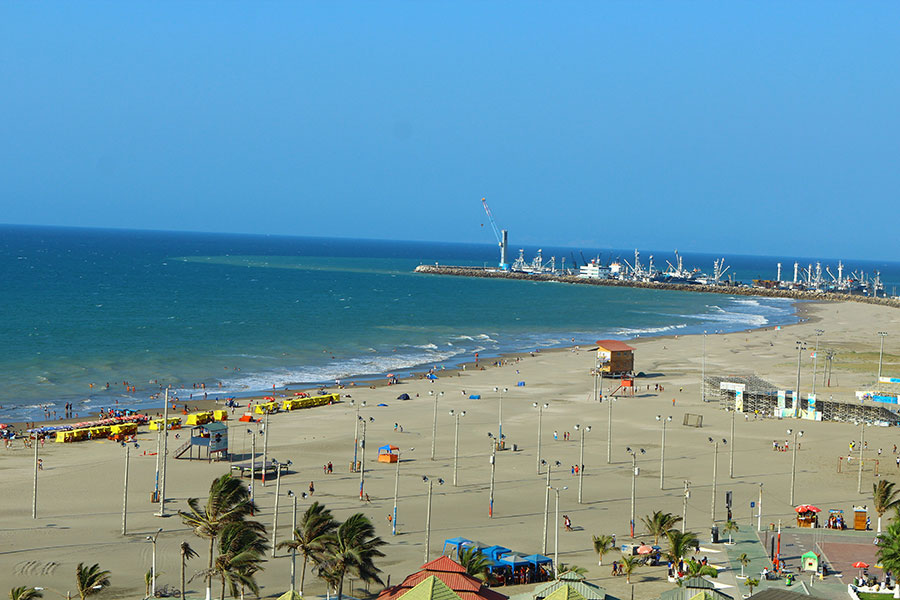
Playa el Murcielago (host stadium partially visible on far right).

The North zone regular season event took place in the Ecuadorian city of Manta. All matches were hosted at the Arena Olimpica de Manta on Playa el Murcielago (El Murcielago Beach). The event was organised in cooperation with the Ecuadorian Football Federation (FEF).

Matches are listed as local time in Manta, ECT (UTC−5).

=== Standings ===
Key:	Advance to the finals /	(H)	Hosts

Pos	Team	Pld	W	W+	WP	L	GF	GA	GD	Pts
1	Team Ecuador (H)	8	7	0	0	1	44	24	+20	21
2	Team Paraguay	8	6	0	1	1	50	32	+18	19
3	Team Colombia	8	4	0	0	4	31	35	–4	12
4	Team Uruguay	8	1	0	0	7	24	38	–14	3
5	Team Venezuela	8	1	0	0	7	26	46	–20	3

=== Results ===
==== Senior category ====
1 October 2019	Paraguay	5–4	Uruguay
17:30		Report

1 October 2019	Ecuador	5–3	Colombia
19:00		Report

2 October 2019	Uruguay	4–6	Colombia
17:30		Report

2 October 2019	Ecuador	5–4	Venezuela
19:00		Report

3 October 2019	Venezuela	2–4	Uruguay
17:30		Report

3 October 2019	Colombia	1–2	Paraguay
19:00		Report

4 October 2019	Paraguay	6–4	Venezuela
17:30		Report

4 October 2019	Ecuador	4–2	Uruguay
19:00		Report

5 October 2019	Colombia	4–2	Venezuela
17:30		Report

5 October 2019	Ecuador	5–4	Paraguay
19:00		Report

==== Under 20s category ====
1 October 2019	Paraguay U20s	10–3	Uruguay U20s
14:00		Report

1 October 2019	Ecuador U20s	6–2	Colombia U20s
15:30		Report

2 October 2019	Uruguay U20s	3–4	Colombia U20s
14:00		Report

2 October 2019	Ecuador U20s	9–1	Venezuela U20s
15:30		Report

3 October 2019	Venezuela U20s	2–1	Uruguay U20s
14:00		Report

3 October 2019	Colombia U20s	4–8	Paraguay U20s
15:30		Report

4 October 2019	Paraguay U20s	10–6	Venezuela U20s
14:00		Report

4 October 2019	Ecuador U20s	5–3	Uruguay U20s
15:30		Report

5 October 2019	Colombia U20s	7–5	Venezuela U20s
14:00		Report

5 October 2019	Ecuador U20s	5–5 (a.e.t.) (1–2 p)	Paraguay U20s
15:30		Report

== Finals ==
The zone winners play each other for the league title; their senior teams play each other over two legs, as do their under 20s representatives for a total of four matches comprising the finals. The winners are the nation which accumulates the most points from all four matches combined and are crowned league champions.

The finals were originally due to take place in 2020. However, due to the outbreak of the COVID-19 pandemic, they were unable to be organised for over two years, finally being scheduled to take place in Playas, Ecuador, from 7–8 May 2022.

All matches took place at the General Villamil Beach Arena.

=== Matches ===
Matches are listed as local time in Playas, ECT (UTC−5).

7 May 2022
15:00

Ecuador U20s	3–5	Brazil U20s
Carrera; Farías	Report	Balinha; Patrick; Alisson; Lucas

Brazil earn three points; Brazil lead the series 3–0.

7 May 2022
16:30

Ecuador	5–11	Brazil
Cedeño; Moncada; Rosales; Farías	Report	Mauricinho; Brendo; Rodrigo; Igor; Zé Lucas; Catarino

Brazil earn three points; Brazil lead the series 6–0.

8 May 2022
15:00

Brazil U20s	4–3	Ecuador U20s
Allisson; Patrick; Balinha	Report	Lucas; Delgado

Brazil earn three points; Brazil lead the series an unassailable 9–0.

8 May 2022
16:30

Brazil	13–4	Ecuador
Rodrigo; Mauricinho; Igor; Brendo; Catarino; Mão; Zé Lucas; Datinha	Report	Bailon; Cedeño

Brazil earn three points; Brazil win the series 12–0.

=== Winners ===
Brazil claimed a clean sweep in the finals, winning all four matches to win the series 12 points to nil and claim their third consecutive title.

With an unassailable lead after match three, the final match was played as a dead rubber.

2019 South American Beach Soccer League
champions

Brazil
Third title
