= 2022 South American Beach Soccer League =

2022 CONMEBOL South American Beach Soccer League
Liga Evolucion de Fútbol Playa 2022
- Map showing the locations of the events of the 2022 season

Tournament details
- Host countries: Argentina; Ecuador
- Dates: Regular season: 6 April – 6 November 2022; Finals: 29–30 April 2023
- Teams: 20 (from 1 confederation)
- Venue(s): 3 (in 3 host cities)

Final positions
- Champions: Brazil (4th title); Paraguay (1st title)

Tournament statistics
- Matches played: 43
- Goals scored: 344 (8 per match)

The 2022 CONMEBOL South American Beach Soccer League (officially, Liga Evolucion de Fútbol Playa (Beach Soccer Evolution League)) was the fourth edition of the South American Beach Soccer League, a continental league competition for South American men's national beach soccer teams. The competition returned for the first time since 2019, having been unable to take place in 2020 and 2021 due to the effects of the COVID-19 pandemic in South America.

Organised by the governing body for South American football, CONMEBOL, as part of its Development Department's Evolution Program, all ten members of the continental confederation took part, with both senior and under 20s national teams participating in the league events.

The teams are first divided into two geographically based zones (North and South) to compete in a round robin tournament against other members of their own zone during the regular season; the points earned by both the senior and under 20s teams are combined. The winners of each zone then proceed to face each other in the finals to contest the title.

Brazil were the three-time defending champions and successfully retained the title once more, sharing it with Paraguay.

== Format ==
The league operated under the same format established for the inaugural season.

== Calendar ==
Phase	Dates	Country	City	Event	Zone	
Regular season	6–10 April 2022	Argentina	Santa Fe	South zone		S
Regular season	2–6 November 2022	Ecuador	La Libertad	North zone	N	
Finals	29–30 April 2023	Argentina	Santa Fe	Finals	N	S

== Teams ==
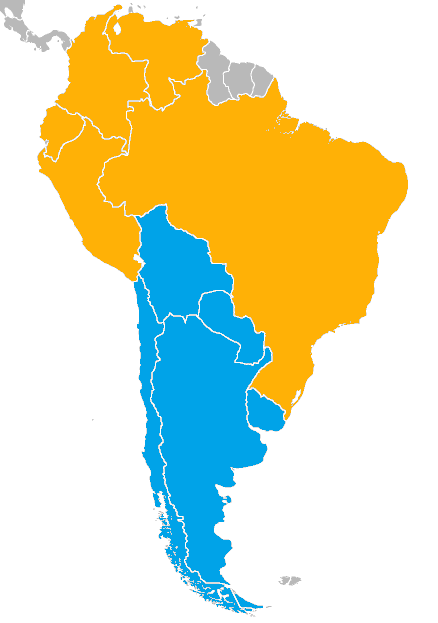
Zone composition of the 2022 SABSL. Nations in the North zone Nations in the South zone Not a member of CONMEBOL

The ten member nations of CONMEBOL entered two teams each: their respective senior and under 20s national teams. In total, 20 teams competed.

For this season, CONMEBOL altered the existing composition of the two zones back to their original states.

The numbers in parentheses show the South American ranking of each team prior to the start of the season (rankings only apply to the senior teams).

=== North zone ===
- Brazil (1st)
- Colombia (5th)
- Ecuador (9th)
- Peru (7th)
- Venezuela (6th)
- Brazil U20s
- Colombia U20s
- Ecuador U20s
- Peru U20s
- Venezuela U20s

=== South zone ===
- Argentina (4th)
- Bolivia (10th)
- Chile (8th)
- Paraguay (3rd)
- Uruguay (2nd)
- Argentina U20s
- Bolivia U20s
- Chile U20s
- Paraguay U20s
- Peru U20s

== South zone ==
The south zone regular season event took place in the Argentinian city of Santa Fe. All matches were hosted on Playa Grande at the Costanera Oeste complex. It was organised in cooperation with the Argentine Football Association (AFA). Paraguay won the event.

=== Standings ===
Pos	Team	Pld	W	W+	WP	L	GF	GA	GD	Pts	Qualification
1	Team Paraguay	8	6	0	0	2	56	19	+37	18	Advance to the finals
2	Team Uruguay	8	4	0	1	3	37	32	+5	13	
3	Team Argentina (H)	8	4	0	1	3	23	28	−5	13	
4	Team Chile	8	2	0	0	6	32	39	−7	6	
5	Team Bolivia	8	2	0	0	6	14	44	−30	6	

(H) Host

=== Results ===
==== Senior category ====
6 April 2022	Paraguay	7–3	Uruguay
19:00		Report

6 April 2022	Argentina	3–1	Bolivia
20:30		Report

7 April 2022	Uruguay	2–3	Bolivia
19:00		Report

7 April 2022	Argentina	2–1	Chile
20:30		Report

8 April 2022	Uruguay	6–6 (a.e.t.) (5–3 p)	Chile
19:00		Report

8 April 2022	Paraguay	8–2	Bolivia
20:30		Report

9 April 2022	Chile	5–9	Paraguay
17:30		Report

9 April 2022	Argentina	4–2	Uruguay
19:00		Report

10 April 2022	Bolivia	4–1	Chile
17:30		Report

10 April 2022	Argentina	2–2 (a.e.t.) (6–5 p)	Paraguay
19:00		Report

==== Under 20s category ====
6 April 2022	Paraguay U20s	3–6	Uruguay U20s
16:00		Report

6 April 2022	Argentina U20s	8–2	Bolivia U20s
17:30		Report

7 April 2022	Uruguay U20s	5–1	Bolivia U20s
16:00		Report

7 April 2022	Argentina U20s	1–6	Chile U20s
17:30		Report

8 April 2022	Uruguay U20s	7–5	Chile U20s
16:00		Report

8 April 2022	Paraguay U20s	10–0	Bolivia U20s
17:30		Report

9 April 2022	Chile U20s	1–9	Paraguay U20s
14:30		Report

9 April 2022	Argentina U20s	3–6	Uruguay U20s
16:00		Report

10 April 2022	Bolivia U20s	1–7	Chile U20s
14:30		Report

10 April 2022	Argentina U20s	0–8	Paraguay U20s
16:00		Report

== North zone ==
The north zone regular season event took place in the Ecuadorian town of La Libertad. All matches were hosted on Playa Cautivo (Captive beach) at a purpose built venue. It was organised in cooperation with the Ecuadorian Football Federation (FEF). Approximately US$300,000 was invested into the event.

=== Standings ===
Pos	Team	Pld	W	W+	WP	L	GF	GA	GD	Pts	Qualification
1	Team Brazil	8	6	1	0	1	47	21	+26	20	Advance to the finals
2	Team Ecuador (H)	8	4	0	0	4	31	34	−3	12	
3	Team Venezuela	8	1	0	4	3	28	27	+1	7	
4	Team Colombia	8	2	0	0	6	28	35	−7	6	
5	Team Peru	8	1	0	1	6	25	42	−17	4	

(H) Host

=== Results ===
==== Senior category ====
2 November 2022	Brazil	4–2	Peru
14:00	Alejandro Maia; Zé Lucas x3	Report	Billyvardo Velezmoro; Diego Alcántara

2 November 2022	Ecuador	4–4 (a.e.t.) (6–7 p)	Venezuela
16:00	José Rosales; Daniel Cedeño; Jorge Bailón; Oswaldo Farías	Report	Wuinder Muñoz; Renny García; Elvic Palacios; Fausto Escobar

3 November 2022	Venezuela	5–5 (a.e.t.) (2–1 p)	Colombia
14:00	Robert Pérez; Wuinder Muñoz; Fausto Escobar x2 Elvic Palacios	Report	Eduardo López; Víctor Morales; Juan Ossa x2 Kevin Thomas

3 November 2022	Ecuador	8–6	Peru
16:00	Daniel Cedeño x3 Ernesto Lara x3 Omar Carrera; Jorge Senge	Report	Billyvardo Velezmoro x3 Diego Alcántara; Jesús Jiménez; Antonio Zamora

4 November 2022	Peru	5–5 (a.e.t.) (4–1 p)	Venezuela
14:00	Diego Alcántara x2 Sócrates Vidal; Jesús Jiménez; Billyvardo Velezmoro	Report	Elvic Palacios; Fausto Escobar x2 Wuinder Muñoz; Rosdel Ramos

4 November 2022	Colombia	5–9	Brazil
16:00	Kevin Thomas; Juan Ossa; Mateo Correa; Alejandro Quintero; Wilson Córdoba	Report	Bernardo De Oliveira x3 Paulo Conceição x2 José Lucas Da Cruz x3 Antonio De Farias

5 November 2022	Brazil	4–1	Venezuela
14:00	Caique Neves; Zé Lucas; Alejandro Maia; Wuinder Muñoz (o.g.)	Report	Rosdel Ramos

5 November 2022	Ecuador	6–3	Colombia
16:00	Ernesto Lara x2 Daniel Cedeño x2 Oswaldo Farías x2	Report	Sebastián Hernández; Juan Ossa; Eduardo López

6 November 2022	Peru	2–3	Colombia
14:00	Diego Alcántara; Jesús Jiménez	Report	Víctor Morales; Rafael Acosta; Wilson Córdoba

6 November 2022	Ecuador	1–5	Brazil
16:00	Daniel Cedeño	Report	Zé Lucas x3 Alejandro Maia; Caique Neves

==== Under 20s category ====
2 November 2022	Brazil U20s	10–3	Peru U20s
8:30	Tulio Rodrigues x3 Gabriel Fernandes Zetum x2 Ruian Da Silva x2 Breno Rodrigues; Luis Henrique Michael; Pedro Lucas Gomes	Report	Adriano Araujo; Luis Travezaño; Jean Pierre Jiménez

2 November 2022	Ecuador U20s	2–2 (a.e.t.) (1–4 p)	Venezuela U20s
10:30	Oswaldo Farías; Randol Solorzano	Report	Randy Rivas x2

3 November 2022	Venezuela U20s	3–3 (a.e.t.) (4–3 p)	Colombia U20s
8:30	Darvin Abaché x2 Randy Rivas	Report	Jorge Martínez; Sebastián Hernández; Cristian Villarreal

3 November 2022	Ecuador U20s	4–3	Peru U20s
10:30	Anderson Delgado; Oswaldo Farías; Randol Solorzano; Danny Chica	Report	Sebastián Villanueva x2 Hugo Baldera

4 November 2022	Peru U20s	1–6	Venezuela U20s
8:30	Cristhian Ruiz	Report	Julio Manzano x2 Vicente Duque; Randy Rivas x2 Sebastián Villanueva (o.g.)

4 November 2022	Colombia U20s	5–3	Brazil U20s
10:30	Jorge Martínez; Sebastián Hernández x2 Juan Saldarriaga; Wolffan Ortiz	Report	Gabriel Fernandes Zetum; Pedro Lucas; Tulio Rodrigues

5 November 2022	Brazil U20s	3–2 (a.e.t.)	Venezuela U20s
8:30	Tulio Rodrigues; Breno Rodrigues; Pedro Lucas	Report	Vicente Duque; Breno Rodrigues (o.g.)

5 November 2022	Ecuador U20s	4–2	Colombia U20s
10:30	Oswaldo Farías x2 Julio Naranjo; Randol Solorzano	Report	Sebastián Hernández; Carmelo Martínez

6 November 2022	Peru U20s	3–2	Colombia U20s
8:00	Sebastián Villanueva; Jean Pierre Jiménez x2	Report	Sebastián Hernández; Carmelo Martínez

6 November 2022	Ecuador U20s	2–9	Brazil U20s
10:30	Oswaldo Farías; Randol Solorzano	Report	Luis Henrique Michael x3 Pedro Lucas Gomes x3 Rian Da Silva x2 Tulio Rodrigues

== Finals ==
The zone winners play each other for the league title; their senior teams play each other over two legs, as do their under 20s representatives for a total of four matches comprising the finals. The winners are the nation which accumulates the most points from all four matches combined.

The finals were organised to take place in Santa Fe, Argentina on 29 and 30 April 2023. All matches were played on Playa Grande at the Costanera Oeste complex.

=== Matches ===
Matches are listed as local time in Santa Fe, ART (UTC−3).

29 April 2023
17:30

Brazil U20s	5–4	Paraguay U20s
Brendo Xavier; Sikinha; Pedro Lucas	Report	J. López; C. Escobar; M. Bogado; E. Cáceres

Brazil earn three points; Brazil lead the series 3–0.

29 April 2023
19:00

Brazil	6–2	Paraguay
Edson Hulk; Brendo; Igor	Report	C.V. Benitez; N. Medina

Brazil earn three points; Brazil lead the series 6–0.

Kick-off of the following match was delayed by 30 minutes due to inclement weather.

30 April 2023
17:30

Paraguay U20s	4–2	Brazil U20s
Medina; González; A. Rodas; E. Cáceres	Report	Sikinha

Paraguay earn three points; Brazil lead the series 6–3.

Whilst Brazil lead the series after the first three matches of the finals, both teams were still in contention to win the title heading into the final match.

However, the strong winds which had delayed the start of the previous match had since intensified, to almost 80kmph. This resulted in the fourth and decisive match of the finals being declared unplayable. CONMEBOL opted not to reschedule but cancel the match entirely.

30 April 2023
19:00

Paraguay	Cancelled	Brazil

Match not played; series abandoned.

=== Winners ===
With the series unable to be resolved on the pitch, CONMEBOL made the decision to award the title of champions to both teams, thereby resulting in a shared title.

2022 South American Beach Soccer League Champions
(Brazil); Brazil; Fourth title	Paraguay; First title
Title shared
