= Engabao =

Small beach town in Playas, Guayas in southern Ecuador

Coordinates: 2.574°S 80.487°W

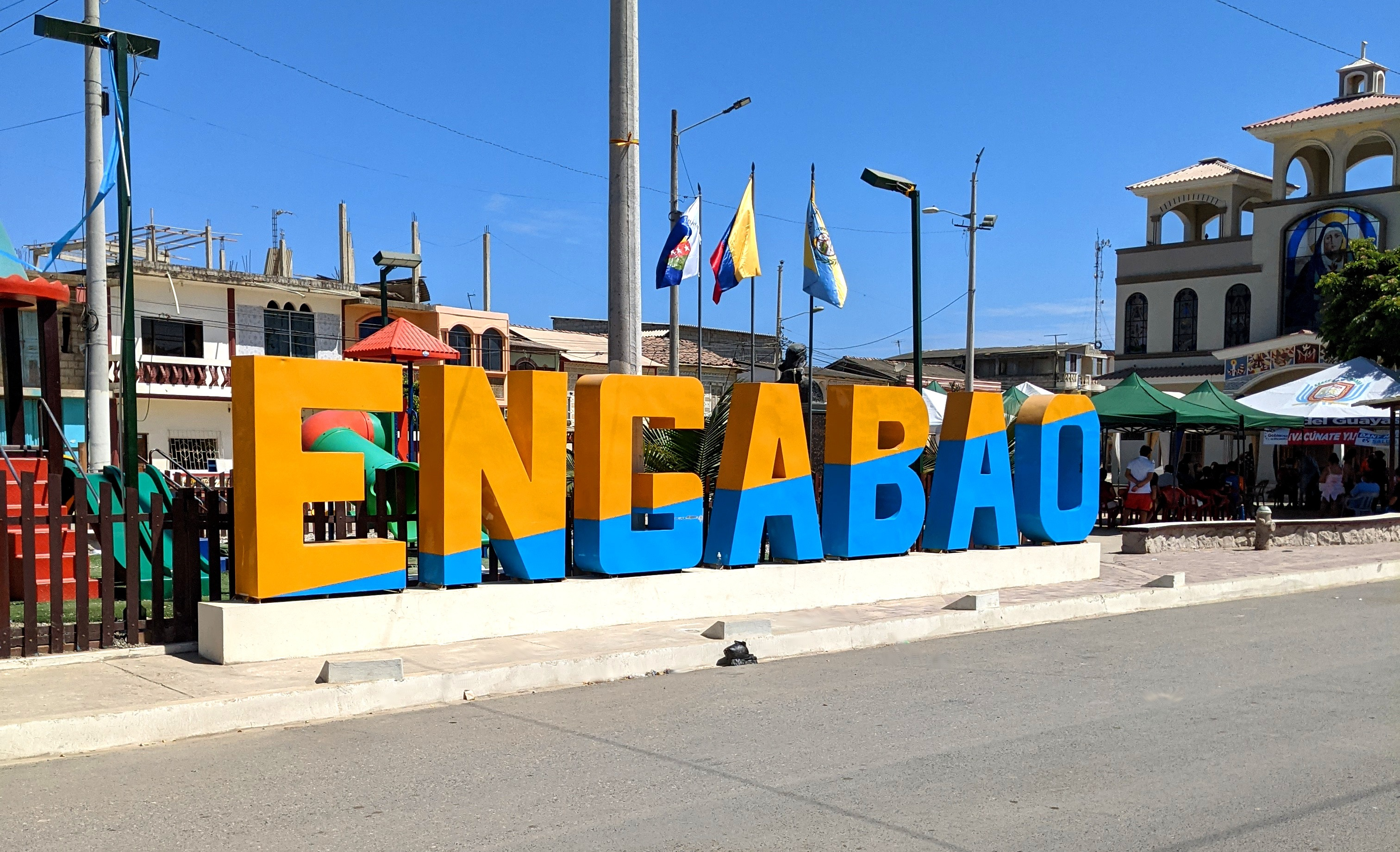
Engabao

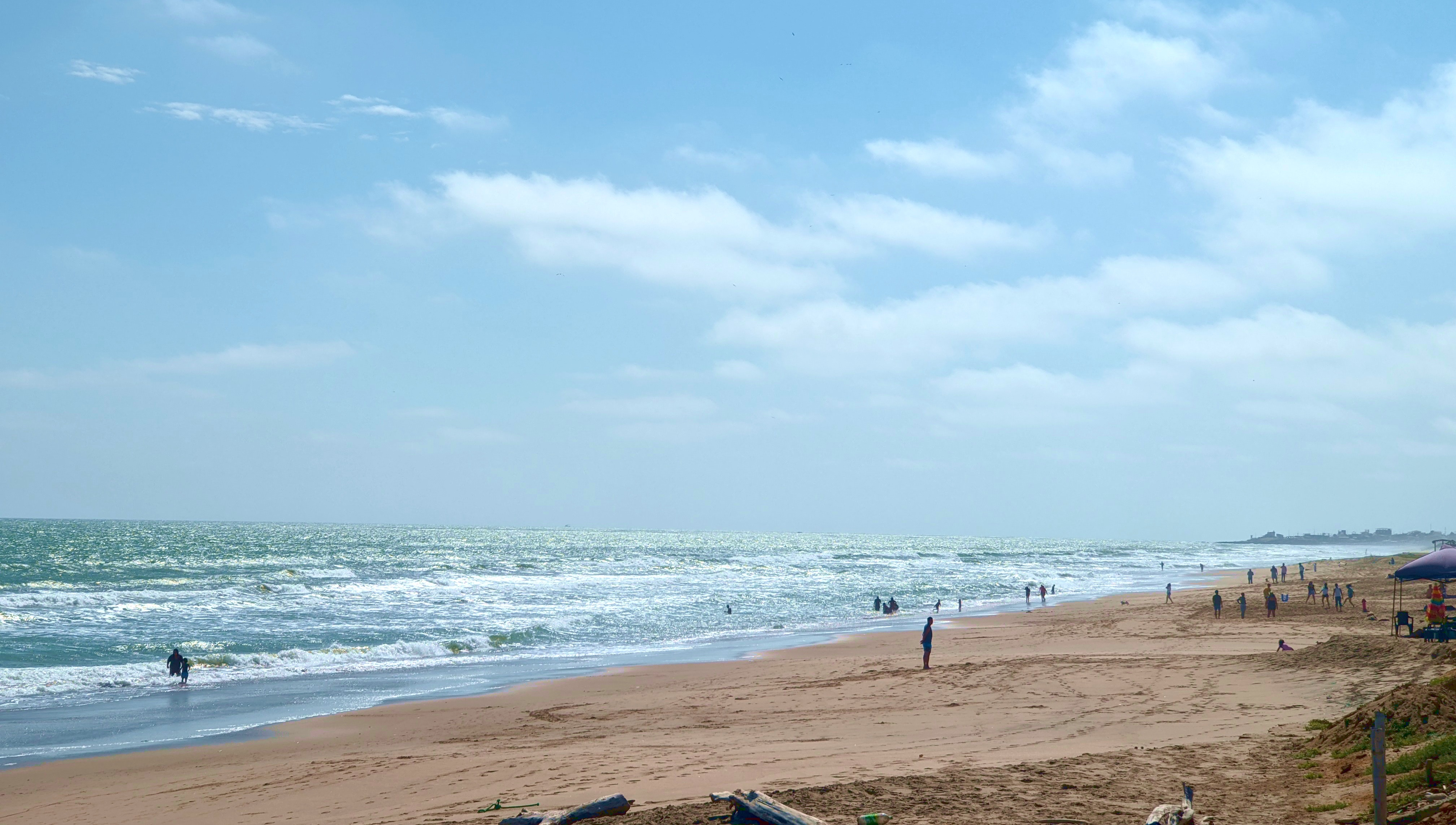
Paraíso beach in Engabao

Engabao or Puerto Engabao is a small beach town in Playas, Guayas, in southern Ecuador. It is 16.6 km from Playas Villamil.

Engabao is a popular surfing destination and also has a lot of fishing activity.
