= 2023 South American Beach Soccer Evolution League =

2023 CONMEBOL South American Beach Soccer League
Liga Evolucion Fútbol Playa 2023
- Map showing the locations of the events of the 2022 season

Tournament details
- Host countries: Paraguay; Ecuador; Brazil
- Dates: Regular season: 11 October – 19 November 2023; Finals: 27–28 April 2024
- Teams: 20 (from 1 confederation)
- Venue(s): 3 (in 3 host cities)

Final positions
- Champions: Paraguay (2nd title)
- Runners-up: Brazil

Tournament statistics
- Matches played: 43
- Goals scored: 325 (7.56 per match)

The 2023 South American Beach Soccer Evolution League (officially, CONMEBOL Liga Evolución de Fútbol Playa (CONMEBOL Beach Soccer Evolution League)) was the fifth edition of the South American Beach Soccer League, a continental league competition for South American men's national beach soccer teams. It was held from 11 October to 19 November 2023 in its regular season (zones round) with the finals being held on 27 and 28 April 2024.

Organised by the governing body for South American football, CONMEBOL, as part of its Development Department's Evolution Program, all ten members of the continental confederation took part, with both senior and under 20s national teams participating in the league events.

The teams were first divided into two geographically based zones (North and South) to compete in a round robin tournament against other members of their own zone during the regular season; the points earned by both the senior and under 20s teams are combined. The winners of each zone then proceed to face each other in the finals to contest the title.

Brazil and Paraguay, who had shared the title the previous season, again contested the finals and this time Paraguay beat the Brazilians to win their second title.

== Format ==
The league operated under the same format established for the inaugural season.

== Calendar ==
Phase	Dates	Country	City	Event	Zone	
Regular season	11–15 October 2023	Paraguay	Luque	South zone		S
Regular season	15–19 November 2023	Ecuador	Salinas	North zone	N	
Finals	27–28 April 2024	Brazil	São Luís	Finals	N	S

== Teams ==
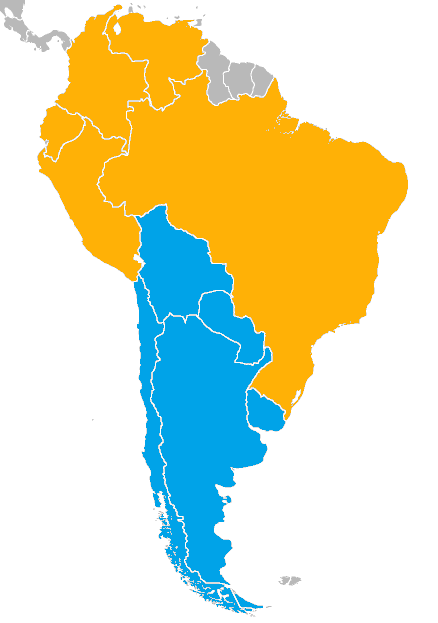
Zone composition of the 2022 SABSL. Nations in the North zone Nations in the South zone Not a member of CONMEBOL

The ten member nations of CONMEBOL entered two teams each: their respective senior and under 20s national teams. In total, 20 teams competed.

For this season, CONMEBOL maintained the composition of the two zones regarding the previous 2022 edition.

The numbers in parentheses show the South American ranking of each team, based on the Beach Soccer Worldwide Rankings (as of 28 August 2023), prior to the start of the season (rankings only apply to the senior teams).

North zone

- Brazil (1st)
- Colombia (3rd)
- Ecuador (9th)
- Peru (7th)
- Venezuela (6th)
- Brazil U20s
- Colombia U20s
- Ecuador U20s
- Peru U20s
- Venezuela U20s

South zone

- Argentina (4th)
- Bolivia (10th)
- Chile (8th)
- Paraguay (2nd)
- Uruguay (5th)
- Argentina U20s
- Bolivia U20s
- Chile U20s
- Paraguay U20s
- Peru U20s

== South zone ==
The south zone regular season event took place in Luque. Paraguay. All matches were hosted at the Los Pynandi World Cup Stadium, located within the Paraguayan Olympic Park. It was organised in cooperation with the Paraguayan Football Association (APF). Paraguay won the South zone title for the fourth time.

=== Standings ===
==== Overall ====
Pos	Team	Pld	W	W+	WP	L	GF	GA	GD	Pts	Qualification
1	Team Paraguay (H)	8	7	0	0	1	39	22	+17	21	Advance to the finals
2	Team Bolivia	8	3	0	2	3	28	34	−6	11	
3	Team Uruguay	8	3	0	1	4	28	27	+1	10	
4	Team Argentina	8	3	0	0	5	29	23	+6	9	
5	Team Chile	8	1	0	0	7	17	35	−18	3	

Source: CONMEBOL
(H) Host

==== Senior category ====
Pos	Team	Pld	W	W+	WP	L	GF	GA	GD	Pts
1	Paraguay (H)	4	3	0	0	1	20	14	+6	9
2	Argentina	4	2	0	0	2	16	10	+6	6
3	Uruguay	4	1	0	1	2	14	13	+1	4
4	Bolivia	4	1	0	1	2	11	18	−7	4
5	Chile	4	1	0	0	3	9	15	−6	3

Source: CONMEBOL
(H) Host

==== Under 20s category ====
Pos	Team	Pld	W	W+	WP	L	GF	GA	GD	Pts
1	Paraguay (H)	4	4	0	0	0	19	8	+11	12
2	Bolivia	4	2	0	1	1	17	16	+1	7
3	Uruguay	4	2	0	0	2	14	14	0	6
4	Argentina	4	1	0	0	3	13	13	0	3
5	Chile	4	0	0	0	4	8	20	−12	0

Source: CONMEBOL
(H) Host

=== Results ===
All match times are local, PYST (UTC−3), as listed by CONMEBOL.

==== Senior category ====
11 October 2023	Argentina	3–3 (a.e.t.) (3–4 p)	Uruguay
16:00	Alex Rutterschmidt 9', 24'; Manuel Pomar 33'	Report	Luis Quintana 4', 23'; Juan Iturriaga 28'	Referee: Jorge Martínez (Paraguay)
	Penalties
	Lautaro Benaducci (penalty scored); Lucas Medero (penalty scored); Emiliano Holmedilla (penalty scored); Nicanor Maciel (penalty missed); Nahuel Gigena (penalty missed)		(penalty scored) Luís Quinta; (penalty scored) Ignacio Di Bello; (penalty scored) Bruno González; (penalty scored) Andrés Laens; (penalty missed) Enzo Ortíz

11 October 2023	Paraguay	8–3	Bolivia
19:00	Néstor Medina 2'; Yoao Rolón 5'; Amado Rolón 8'; Valentín Domínguez 18'; Jesús Martínez 20'; Sixto Cantero 21', 33'; Matías Gallinar 28'	Report	Dahulon Zárate 6', 15'; David Aguilar 11'	Referee: Gustavo Domínguez (Paraguay)

12 October 2023	Bolivia	3–3 (a.e.t.) (4–3 p)	Argentina
15:30	David Aguilar 19'; Jesús Gutiérrez 20'; Remberto Portales 34'	Report	Alex Rutterschmidt 10'; Lautaro Benaducci 22'; Nahuel Gigena 32'	Referee: Astrid Mendoza (Paraguay)
	Penalties
	Darlon Zárate (penalty scored); Dahulon Zárate (penalty scored); Berthy Alpiri (penalty scored); Jesús Gutiérrez (penalty scored); Dudy Chávez (penalty missed)		(penalty scored) Lucas Medero; (penalty scored) Emiliano Holmedilla; (penalty scored) Lautaro Benaducci; (penalty missed) Lucas Ponzetti; (penalty missed) Manuel Pomar

12 October 2023	Chile	2–5	Paraguay
18:30	Diego Opazo 14'; Benjamín Cruz 36'	Report	Jesús Martínez 2'; Bastián Gordillo 1T' (o.g.); Néstor Medina 12', 3T'; Matías Gallinar 2T'	Referee: Bill Villalba (Paraguay)

13 October 2023	Uruguay	5–2	Bolivia
16:00	Luis Quintana 5'; Maximiliano Echenique 7'; Andrés Laens 16'; Juan Iturriaga 34'	Report	Dahulon Zárate 22'; Dudy Chávez 29'	Referee: Diego Santander (Paraguay)

13 October 2023	Argentina	5–2	Chile
19:00	Lucas Madero 1T'; Lucas Ponzetti 2T'; Nahuel Gigena 29', 31'; Manuel Pomar 33'	Report	Diego San Martín 3T', 3T'	Referee: Gustavo Domínguez (Paraguay)

14 October 2023	Chile	2–3	Bolivia
16:00	Benjamín Cruz 14'; Diego San Martín 33'	Report	Darlon Zárate 2'; Remberto Portales 23'; David Aguilar 36'	Referee: Adán Villalba (Paraguay)

14 October 2023	Paraguay	5–4	Uruguay
19:00	Jesús Martínez 5', 31'; Sixto Cantero 9', 34'; Néstor Medina 11'; Matías Gallinar 2T'	Report	Andrés Laens 10', 23'; Facundo Cordero 21', 25'	Referee: Gustavo Domínguez (Paraguay)

15 October 2023	Uruguay	2–3	Chile
16:00	Luis Quintana 10'; Juan Iturraga 11'	Report	Benjamín Arce 14'; Diego San Martin 15'; Rodrigo Huarache 16'	Referee: Bill Villalba (Paraguay)

15 October 2023	Paraguay	2–5	Argentina
19:00	Matías Gallinar 2T'; Sixto Cantero 2T'	Report	Lucas Ponzetti 2T', 31'; Lautaro Benaducci 2T'; Manuel Pomar 26'; Nahuel Gigena 31'	Referee: Silvio Coronel (Paraguay)

==== Under 20s category ====
11 October 2023	Argentina U20s	3–4	Uruguay U20s
14:30	Juan Corvalán 7', 35'; Aucan Sierra 31'	Report	Lorenzo Pecora 18', 22'; Santiago Bargas 27', 29'	Referee: Silvio Coronel (Paraguay)

11 October 2023	Paraguay U20s	5–3	Bolivia U20s
17:30	César Escobar 7'; Milciades Medina 12'; Thiago Barrios 12'; Elías Aguiar 23'; Alexandro Luraschi 24'	Report	Rubén Velasco 23'; José Claudio 30'; Jefferson Castro 36'	Referee: Diego Santander (Paraguay)

12 October 2023	Bolivia U20s	6–5	Argentina U20s
14:00	Marco López 10', 33'; Antonio Brito 13'; Rubén Velasco 13', 30'; Kevin Acosta 34'	Report	Franco Meletto 8'; Onan Hilt 2'; Juan Corvalán 3T', 3T', 3T'	Referee: Carlos Martínez (Paraguay)

12 October 2023	Chile U20s	1–5	Paraguay U20s
17:00	Matías Aray 26'	Report	César Escobar 10'; Milciades Medina 2T', 2T'; Thiago Barrios 2T'; Jesús Astorga 34'	Referee: José Ocampo (Paraguay)

13 October 2023	Uruguay U20s	2–2 (a.e.t.) (2–3 p)	Bolivia U20s
14:30	Mateo de León 23'; Santiago Bargas 33'	Report	Mathey Olivera 7' (o.g.); Kevin Acosta 20'	Referee: Guillermo Chamorro (Paraguay)
	Penalties
	Mateo De León (penalty scored); Santiago Bargas (penalty scored); Richard Ribero (penalty missed); Bruno González (penalty missed); Juan Mosquera (penalty missed)		(penalty scored) Jorge Gutiérrez; (penalty scored) Juan Pablo Cruz; (penalty scored) Rubén Velazco; (penalty missed) Antonio Brito

13 October 2023	Argentina U20s	4–0	Chile U20s
17:30	Aucan Sierra 2'; Onan Hilt 6'; Franco Meletto 26', 34'	Report		Referee: Jorge Martínez (Paraguay)

14 October 2023	Chile U20s	4–6	Bolivia U20s
14:30	Luis Montero 3'; Nicolás Zurita 4'; César Rama 28'; Jeremy Álvarez 32'	Report	Juan Pablo Cruz 9'; Kevin Acosta 13', 23'; Marco López 21'; Rubén Velasco 34', 35'	Referee: José Recalde (Paraguay)

14 October 2023	Paraguay U20s	6–3	Uruguay U20s
17:30	Alexandro Luraschi 3'; Thiago Barrios 14'; Elías Aguiar 16'; Milciades Medina 19', 28', 33'	Report	Bruno González 11', 14'; Mateo de León 35'	Referee: Silvio Coronel (Paraguay)

15 October 2023	Uruguay U20s	5–3	Chile U20s
14:30	Mateo de León 10'; Richard Ribero 11', 35'; Bruno González 21'; Lorenzo Pecora 26'	Report	Luis Montero 9', 13'; César Rama 28'	Referee: Astrid Mendoza (Paraguay)

15 October 2023	Paraguay U20s	3–1	Argentina U20s
17:30	Carlos Mareco 1'; César Escobar 19'; Alexandro Luraschi 20'	Report	Onan Hilt 19'	Referee: Feliciano Fariña (Paraguay)

== North zone ==
The north zone regular season event took place in Salinas. Ecuador. All matches were hosted at Cancha Las Palmeras. It was organised in cooperation with the Ecuadorian Football Federation (FEF). Brazil won their fourth North zone title undefeated and with one matchday to spare.

=== Standings ===
==== Overall ====
Pos	Team	Pld	W	W+	WP	L	GF	GA	GD	Pts	Qualification
1	Team Brazil	8	8	0	0	0	45	12	+33	24	Advance to the finals
2	Team Colombia	8	4	0	1	3	35	33	+2	13	
3	Team Ecuador (H)	8	3	0	1	4	28	39	−11	10	
4	Team Peru	8	1	0	1	6	26	42	−16	4	
5	Team Venezuela	8	1	0	0	7	24	32	−8	3	

(H) Host

==== Senior category ====
Pos	Team	Pld	W	W+	WP	L	GF	GA	GD	Pts
1	Brazil	4	4	0	0	0	21	4	+17	12
2	Peru	4	1	0	1	2	13	15	−2	4
3	Ecuador (H)	4	1	0	1	2	15	20	−5	4
4	Colombia	4	1	0	1	2	12	18	−6	4
5	Venezuela	4	0	0	0	4	10	14	−4	0

(H) Host

==== Under 20s category ====
Pos	Team	Pld	W	W+	WP	L	GF	GA	GD	Pts
1	Brazil	4	4	0	0	0	24	8	+16	12
2	Colombia	4	3	0	0	1	23	15	+8	9
3	Ecuador (H)	4	2	0	0	2	13	19	−6	6
4	Venezuela	4	1	0	0	3	14	18	−4	3
5	Peru	4	0	0	0	4	13	27	−14	0

(H) Host

=== Results ===
All match times are local, ECT (UTC−5), as listed by CONMEBOL.

==== Senior category ====
15 November 2023	Brazil	5–1	Peru
14:00	Zé Lucas 10'; Tiago Santos "Bobô" 11'; Edson Hulk 26'; Datinha 28'; Rodrigo 32'	Report	Irwin Acuña 23'

15 November 2023	Ecuador	4–3	Venezuela
16:00	Ernesto Lara 10', 26'; Cristhian Gallegos 21'; Michael Loor 27'	Report	Enderson Ramos 7'; José Bentancourt 9'; Vicente Duque 25'

16 November 2023	Colombia	3–5	Peru
13:30	Juan Ossa 2'; Esleider De Ávila 19'; Rafael Acosta 24'	Report	Joaquín Manco 14'; Billyvardo Velezmoro 17', 32'; Cristhian Sialier 22'; Alejandro Quintero 33' (o.g.)	Referee: Stalin Ugalde (Ecuador)

16 November 2023	Venezuela	2–5	Brazil
15:30	Juan Narea 8'; Edgar Castellanos	Report	Filipe Silva 17'; Edson Hulk 18', 35'; Rodrigo 22'; Bruno Xavier 30'

17 November 2023	Peru	1–1 (a.e.t.) (3–1 p)	Venezuela
14:00	Jean Pierre Vargas 35'	Report	Randy Rivas 19'	Referee: Jean Carlos Villamar (ECU)
	Penalties
	Irwin Acuña (penalty missed); Sócrates Vidal (penalty scored); Diego Alcántara (penalty scored); Jean Pierre Vargas (penalty scored)		(penalty missed) Enderson Ramos; (penalty missed) Edgar Castellanos; (penalty scored) Juan Narea; (penalty missed) José Bentancourt

17 November 2023	Colombia	5–4	Ecuador
16:00	Alejandro Quintero 3'; Julio Pantoja 4'; Luis Lucas 7' (o.g.); Esleider De Ávila 17'; Rafael Acosta 36'	Report	Ernesto Lara 3', 20', 29'; Michael Loor 34'

18 November 2023	Brazil	5–0	Colombia
14:00	Filipe Silva 19', 31'; Rodrigo 30'; Zé Lucas 32'; Edson Hulk 33'	Report

18 November 2023	Ecuador	6–6 (a.e.t.) (4–2 p)	Peru
16:00	Horlen Klinger 5'; Jorge Senge 20'; Ernesto Lara 22', 23', 35'; Oswaldo Farias 33'	Report	Cristhian Sialer 1', 25'; Joaquín Manco 13'; Diego Alcántara 17'; Jean Pierre Vargas 31'; Sócrates Vidal 34'
	Penalties
	Horlen Klinger (penalty scored); Ernesto Lara (penalty missed); Cristhian Gallegos (penalty scored); Luis Lucas (penalty scored); Marlon Baños (penalty scored)		(penalty missed) Diego Alcántara; (penalty missed) Irwin Acuña; (penalty scored) Sócrates Vidal; (penalty scored) Jean Pierre Vargas

19 November 2023	Venezuela	4–4 (a.e.t.) (3–5 p)	Colombia
14:00	César Pinto 4'; Anibal Rivera 21'; Rosdel Ramos 22'; Fausto Escobar 36'	Report	Esleider De Ávila 9'; Eduardo López 23'; Wilmar Donado 31'; Juan Ossa 32'	Referee: Jean Carlos Villamar (Ecuador)
	Penalties
	Rosdel Ramos (penalty scored); Fausto Escobar (penalty scored); Jeyker Rivero (penalty scored); César Pinto (penalty missed)		(penalty scored) Juan Ossa; (penalty scored) Wilmar Donado; (penalty scored) Esleider De Ávila; (penalty scored) Julio Pantoja; (penalty scored) Kevin Clavijo

19 November 2023	Ecuador	1–6	Brazil
16:00	Ernesto Lara 10'	Report	Filipe Silva 10', 11', 32'; Bruno Xavier 22'; Edson Hulk 33'; Rodrigo 35'

==== Under 20s category ====
15 November 2023	Brazil U20s	8–2	Peru U20s
8:30	Marcel Pires 1'; Bruno Xavier 8'; Marceone Pires 18', 20', 29'x2 Breno Rodrigues 21'; Guilherme Martins 25'; Alessandro Toscano 30'	Report	Jhonatan Guanilo 16'; Juan Vidarte 23'

15 November 2023	Ecuador U20s	4–3	Venezuela U20s
10:30	Mario Cerdeño 5'; Carlos Cañola 7'; Antony Robles 18'; José Barreto 24'	Report	César Pinto 1'; Anibal Rivera 19'; Randiel Angulo 32'

16 November 2023	Colombia U20s	8–2	Peru U20s
8:30	Brayan Gómez 3', 11', 26'; Cristian Villarreal 7'; Luis Rodríguez 13', 14' (33); Jheider López 34'	Report	Jhonatan Guanilo 8'; Rubén Azaña 12'

16 November 2023	Venezuela U20s	3–4	Brazil U20s
10:30	César Pinto 14', 20'; Arian Moreno 29'	Report	Breno Rodrigues 2'; Carlos Jesús Da Silva 23'; João Castro 35'; Marceone Pires 35'

17 November 2023	Peru U20s	4–5	Venezuela U20s
8:30	Sebastián Villanueva 4', 13', 14'; Jean Pierre Jiménez 30'	Report	Rayner García 9', 24'; César Pinto 15'; Aníbal Rivera 19', 31'

17 November 2023	Colombia U20s	7–2	Ecuador U20s
10:30	Brayan Gómez 7', 18', 19', 35'; Luis Rodríguez 13'; Franclin Briñez 28'; Jheider López 29'	Report	Nilo Aragundi 2'; Erick Loor 19'

18 November 2023	Brazil U20s	8–2	Colombia U20s
8:30	Guilherme Martins 1', 4'; Carlos Jesús 15'; Marciel Pires 17', 32'; Breno Rodrigues 20', 32'; João Castro 26'	Report	Franclin Briñez 2', 22'

18 November 2023	Ecuador U20s	6–5	Peru U20s
10:30	Junior Ponce 1'; José Barreto 12'; Antony Robles 9', 21', 26', 34'	Report	Adriano Araujo 17'; Sergio Piscoya 18', 28'; Juan Vidarte 27'; Sebastián Villanueva 35'

19 November 2023	Venezuela U20s	3–6	Colombia U20s
8:30	Randiel Angulo 4'; César Pinto 6'; Cristofer Noguera 9'	Report	Brayan Gómez 3'; Jheider López 6', 32'; Luis Rodríguez 7', 10'; Joilson Nofuya 10'

19 November 2023	Ecuador U20s	1–4	Brazil U20s
10:30	Junior Ponce 30'	Report	Guilherme Martins 11'; Marceone Pires 24'; Carlos Jesús 29'; Marciel Pires 33'

== Finals ==
The zone winners faced each other for the league title with their senior teams playing each other over two legs, as do their under 20s representatives for a total of four matches comprising the finals. The winners are the national team which accumulates the most points from all four matches combined.

The finals were organised to take place in São Luís (MA), Brazil on 27 and 28 April 2024. All matches were played at the Arena Domingos Leal.

=== Matches ===
All match times are local, BRT (UTC−3), as listed by CONMEBOL.

27 April 2024
16:30

Paraguay U20s	3–6	Brazil U20s
Luis Gómez 4'; Thiago Barrios 22'; César Escobar 36'	Report	Breno Rodrigues 2', 8', 17'; Marciel Pires 27', 34'; Marceone Pires 36'

Arena Domingos Leal
Referee: Mariano Romo (Argentina)

Brazil earn three points; Brazil lead the series 3–0.

The second match of the finals between the senior teams was initially suspended and then cancelled due to inclement weather (heavy rains).

27 April 2023
18:30

Paraguay	Cancelled	Brazil

Match not played; Brazil continued to lead the series 3–0.

In order to avoid further cancellations due to weather conditions, the kick-off of the second day's matches was moved forward from 16:00 and 18:00 to 11:00 and 13:00, respectively.

28 April 2024
11:00

Brazil U20s	3–5	Paraguay U20s
Breno Rodrigues 8'; Marceone Pires 21'; Yuri Gaertner 28'	Report	Luis Gómez 7'; Milciades Medina 8', 30'; Thiago Barrios 12'; Alexandro Luraschi 34'

Arena Domingos Leal
Referee: Carlos Maidana (Argentina)

Paraguay earn three points; series tied at 3–3.

28 April 2024
13:00

Brazil	4–5	Paraguay
Rodrigo 12'; Brendo Chagas 14'; Diogo Catarino 16'; Bruno Xavier 29'	Report	Carlos Carballo 5' (pen.); Thiago Barrios 24'; Néstor Medina 28', 34'; Yoao Rolón 33'

Arena Domingos Leal
Referee: José Romo (Argentina)

Paraguay earn three points; Paraguay won the series 6–3.

=== Winners ===
After the cancellation of the second match on the first day, CONMEBOL decided to take into account only the points accumulated in the three remaining matches to define the champions. Paraguay came from behind in the second day to win the series 6 points to 3 and claimed their second title, thus breaking the streak of 4 consecutive titles won by Brazil.

2023 South American Beach Soccer Evolution League
champions

Paraguay
Second title
