= Beach soccer at the 2022 South American Games =

Beach soccer competitions at the 2022 South American Games

- Venue: Los Pynandi World Cup Stadium
- Dates: October 2−6
- Nations: 5

Beach soccer competitions at the 2022 South American Games in Asunción, Paraguay were held between October 2 and 6, 2022 at the Los Pynandi World Cup Stadium.

== Schedule ==
The competition schedule is as follows:

| G | Group stage |

| Date Event | Sun 2 | Mon 3 | Tue 4 | Wed 5 | Thu 6 |
|---|---|---|---|---|---|
| Men's beach football | G | G | G | G | G |

== Medal summary ==
=== Medal table ===
* Host nation (Paraguay)

| Rank | Nation | Gold | Silver | Bronze | Total |
|---|---|---|---|---|---|
| 1 | Paraguay (PAR)* | 1 | 0 | 0 | 1 |
| 2 | Argentina (ARG) | 0 | 1 | 0 | 1 |
| 3 | Peru (PER) | 0 | 0 | 1 | 1 |
| Totals (3 entries) | | 1 | 1 | 1 | 3 |

=== Medalists ===
| Event | Gold | Silver | Bronze |
|---|---|---|---|
| Men's tournament | Paraguay; Amado Rolón; Carlos Benítez; Carlos Carballo; Jesús Martínez; Jhovanny Benítez; Luis Ojeda; Milciades Medina; Néstor Medina; Pablo Benítez; Saúl González; Sixto Cantero; Yoao Rolón | Argentina; Emanuel de Sosa; Emiliano Holmedilla; Lautaro Benaducci; Lucas Ponzetti; Lucas Medero; Luciano Sirico; Manuel Pomar; Mariano Mansilla; Maximiliano Ponzetti; Nahuel Cipolletta; Nahuel Gigena; Sebastián Gómez | Peru; Antonio Zamora; Billyvardo Velezmoro; Deynor Puelles; Diego Alcantara; Enzon Delgado; Hugo Lescano; Irwing Acuña; Jean Vargas; Jesús Jiménez; Luis Mori; Sergio Chávez; Socrates Vidal |

== Participation ==
Five nations participated in beach soccer events of the 2022 South American Games.

- Argentina
- Paraguay
- Peru
- Uruguay
- Venezuela

== Results ==
| Pos | Team | Pld | W | L | PF | PA | PD | Pts | Result | PAR | ARG | PER | URU | VEN |
|---|---|---|---|---|---|---|---|---|---|---|---|---|---|---|
| 1 | Paraguay | 4 | 4 | 0 | 32 | 11 | +21 | 8 | 1st place, gold medalist(s) | — | 4–0 | 11–4 | 7–4 | 10–3 |
| 2 | Argentina | 4 | 3 | 1 | 17 | 16 | +1 | 7 | 2nd place, silver medalist(s) | 0–4 | — | 6–4 | 5–4 | 6–4 |
| 3 | Peru | 4 | 2 | 2 | 16 | 23 | −7 | 6 | 3rd place, bronze medalist(s) | 4–11 | 4–6 | — | 6–5 | 2–1 |
| 4 | Uruguay | 4 | 1 | 3 | 19 | 22 | −3 | 5 | | 4–7 | 4–5 | 5–6 | — | 6–4 |
| 5 | Venezuela | 4 | 0 | 4 | 12 | 24 | −12 | 4 | | 3–10 | 4–6 | 1–2 | 4–6 | — |
