= 2011 South American Beach Soccer Championship =

2011 FIFA Beach Soccer World Cup CONMEBOL qualifier
2011 South American Beach Soccer Championship
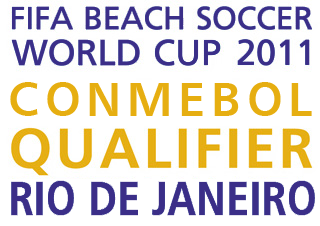

Tournament details
- Host country: Brazil
- Dates: 31 July – 7 August
- Teams: 9 (from 1 confederation)
- Venue: 1 (in 1 host city)

Final positions
- Champions: Brazil (4th title)
- Runners-up: Argentina
- Third place: Venezuela
- Fourth place: Colombia

Tournament statistics
- Matches played: 20
- Goals scored: 183 (9.15 per match)
- Top scorer(s): (Brazil) Bruno Malias (12 goals)
- Best player: (Brazil) Bruno Malias

The 2011 FIFA Beach Soccer World Cup CONMEBOL qualifier, also later and commonly known as the 2011 South American Beach Soccer Championship, was the fourth Beach Soccer World Cup qualification championship for South America, held from July 31– August 7 on Copacabana beach in Rio de Janeiro, Brazil. The tournament was originally scheduled to take place from 7 – 14 May 2011.

The qualifiers were not coordinated by CONMEBOL at the time. The event was organised by Beach Soccer Worldwide (BSWW), under the FIFA Beach Soccer World Cup Qualifier title. CONMEBOL began recognising the tournaments in 2013, under the title South American Beach Soccer Championship, also acknowledging the 2006–11 events as historic editions of the championship. CONMEBOL eventually began organising the qualifiers in 2017, under a new title.

== Participating teams ==
A tournament-record nine teams, an increase of one team from the previous CONMEBOL qualifier, have confirmed their participation in the competition.

- Argentina
- Brazil
- Chile
- Colombia
- Ecuador
- Paraguay
- Peru
- Uruguay
- Venezuela

== Group stage ==
The draw to decide the groups was conducted on June 29, 2011.

All match times were of local time in Rio de Janeiro, being Brasilia Time, (UTC-03:00).

=== Group A ===
| Team | Pld | W | W+ | L | GF | GA | +/- | Pts |
|---|---|---|---|---|---|---|---|---|
| Brazil | 4 | 4 | 0 | 0 | 44 | 6 | +38 | 12 |
| Venezuela | 4 | 2 | 0 | 2 | 15 | 19 | −4 | 6 |
| Paraguay | 4 | 1 | 1 | 2 | 21 | 32 | −11 | 5 |
| Chile | 4 | 1 | 0 | 3 | 17 | 21 | −4 | 3 |
| Peru | 4 | 0 | 1 | 3 | 13 | 32 | −19 | 2 |

clinched Knockout Stage berth

31 July 2011
11:00

| Venezuela | 5 – 2 | Peru |
|---|---|---|
| | Report |

Praia de Copacabana

31 July 2011
12:15

| Paraguay | 1 – 14 | Brazil |
|---|---|---|
| | Report |

Praia de Copacabana

1 August 2011
13:15

| Chile | 6 – 3 | Paraguay |
|---|---|---|
| | Report |

Praia de Copacabana

1 August 2011
15:45

| Brazil | 13 – 1 | Peru |
|---|---|---|
| | Report |

Praia de Copacabana

2 August 2011
13:15

| Peru | 5 – 9 | Paraguay |
|---|---|---|
| | Report |

Praia de Copacabana

2 August 2011
15:45

| Venezuela | 3 – 2 | Chile |
|---|---|---|
| | Report |

Praia de Copacabana

3 August 2011
13:15

| Venezuela | 7 – 8 (a.e.t.) | Paraguay |
|---|---|---|
| | Report |

Praia de Copacabana

3 August 2011
15:45

| Brazil | 10 – 4 | Chile |
|---|---|---|
| | Report |

Praia de Copacabana

4 August 2011
14:30

| Chile | 5 – 5 (a.e.t.) | Peru |
|---|---|---|
| | Report |
Penalties
| Penalty missed | 0 – 1 | Penalty scored |

Praia de Copacabana

4 August 2011
15:45

| Brazil | 7 – 0 | Venezuela |
|---|---|---|
| | Report |

Praia de Copacabana

=== Group B ===
| Team | Pld | W | W+ | L | GF | GA | +/- | Pts |
|---|---|---|---|---|---|---|---|---|
| Argentina | 3 | 3 | 0 | 0 | 11 | 6 | +5 | 9 |
| Colombia | 3 | 1 | 1 | 1 | 12 | 9 | +3 | 5 |
| Uruguay | 3 | 1 | 0 | 2 | 14 | 10 | +4 | 3 |
| Ecuador | 3 | 0 | 0 | 3 | 9 | 21 | −12 | 0 |

clinched Knockout Stage berth

1 August 2011
12:00

| Argentina | 4 – 3 | Ecuador |
|---|---|---|
| | Report |

Praia de Copacabana

1 August 2011
14:30

| Colombia | 3 – 3 (a.e.t.) | Uruguay |
|---|---|---|
| | Report |
Penalties
| Penalty scored | 1 – 0 | Penalty missed |

Praia de Copacabana

2 August 2011
12:00

| Argentina | 2 – 0 | Colombia |
|---|---|---|
| | Report |

Praia de Copacabana

2 August 2011
14:30

| Uruguay | 8 – 2 | Ecuador |
|---|---|---|
| | Report |

Praia de Copacabana

3 August 2011
12:00

| Ecuador | 4 – 9 | Colombia |
|---|---|---|
| | Report |

Praia de Copacabana

3 August 2011
14:30

| Uruguay | 3 – 5 | Argentina |
|---|---|---|
| | Report |

Praia de Copacabana

== Knockout stage ==
Semifinals
B1 | Argentina | 3
A2 | Venezuela | 2
A1 | Brazil | 6
B2 | Colombia | 2

Final
SF1 | Argentina | 2
SF2 | Brazil | 6
Third place play off
SF1 | Venezuela | 5
SF2 | Colombia | 2

=== Semi finals ===
6 August 2011
11:15

| Argentina | 3 – 2 | Venezuela |
|---|---|---|
| | Report |

Praia de Copacabana

6 August 2011
12:30

| Brazil | 6 – 2 | Colombia |
|---|---|---|
| | Report |

Praia de Copacabana

=== Third place play off ===
7 August 2011
11:15

| Venezuela | 5 – 2 | Colombia |
|---|---|---|
| | Report |

Praia de Copacabana

=== Final ===
7 August 2011
12:30

| Argentina | 2 – 6 | Brazil |
|---|---|---|
| | Report |

Praia de Copacabana

== Winners ==
(2011) FIFA Beach Soccer World Cup
Qualification (CONMEBOL) Winners:

Brazil
4th title

== Awards ==
Best Player (MVP)
(Brazil) Bruno Malias
Top Scorer
(Brazil) Bruno Malias
12 goals
Best Goalkeeper
(Brazil) Mão

== Teams Qualifying ==
| | Team |
|---|---|
| 1st Place | Brazil |
| 2nd Place | Argentina |
| 3rd Place | Venezuela |

== Final Placement ==
| Rank | Team |
|---|---|
| 1 | Brazil |
| 2 | Argentina |
| 3 | Venezuela |
| 4 | Colombia |
| 5 | Uruguay |
| 6 | Paraguay |
| 7 | Chile |
| 8 | Ecuador |
| 9 | Peru |
