= Gaira =

Gaira Localidad III (Turística - Perla del Caribe)
- Locality
- Buildings at the mouth of the Gaira River on Salguero Beach (El Rodadero sector)

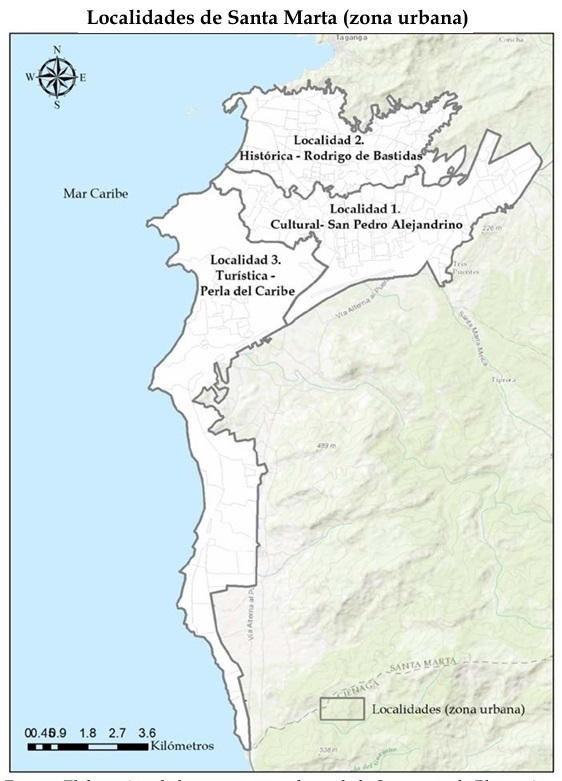
- Locality 3 of Santa Marta
- Country: Colombia
- Department: Magdalena
- District: Santa Marta
- Founded: 21 July 1521
- Erected as a locality: 2015

Gaira (officially, Localidad III Turística - Perla del Caribe, "Locality III Tourist – Pearl of the Caribbean") is a locality of the district of Santa Marta. It is located on the Bay of Gaira on the Caribbean Sea. It is known for the beach of El Rodadero, one of the most popular seaside resorts in Colombia.

== Division ==
Localidad III (Turística - Perla del Caribe) is the merger of the now-defunct Comuna 7 (Gaira-Rodadero) and Comuna 8 (Pozos Colorados - Don Jaca). It also contains the populated centers of Minca and Tigrera.

- The Gaira sector is divided into the following neighborhoods (barrios):

Brisas del Lago, Cerro Intermedio, Cerro La Llorona, Cerro La Virgen, Cerro M Cristal, Doce de Octubre, Eduardo Gutiérrez, El Carmen El Socorro, El Valle de Gaira, Gaira - Centro, La Magdalena, La Quemada, La Quinina, Pozos Colorados, Lago Dulcino, Las Colinas, Las Palmeras, Nueva Betel, El Rodadero Tradicional, Sarabanda, Vereda Mosquito, Villa Berlín, Villa Tanga, Puente Arhuacos, Bella Vista, Bello Sol, Cristalina, Cristo Rey, Don Jaca, Alto El Mango, Gauchovand, La Chivera, La Eva, La Paz, Limón, Los Lirios, Sircasia, Totumo, Villa Taroa, Vista del Mar, Vista Hermosa.

- Meanwhile, the Pozos Colorados - Don Jaca sector is divided into the following neighborhoods:

Aeromar, Bella Sol, Bella Vista, Cristalina, Cristo Rey, Don Jaca Alto, El Mango, La Chivera, La Eva, La Paz, Limón, Los Lirios, Circasia, Taroa, Totumo, Vista del Mar, Vista Hermosa.

== Geography ==
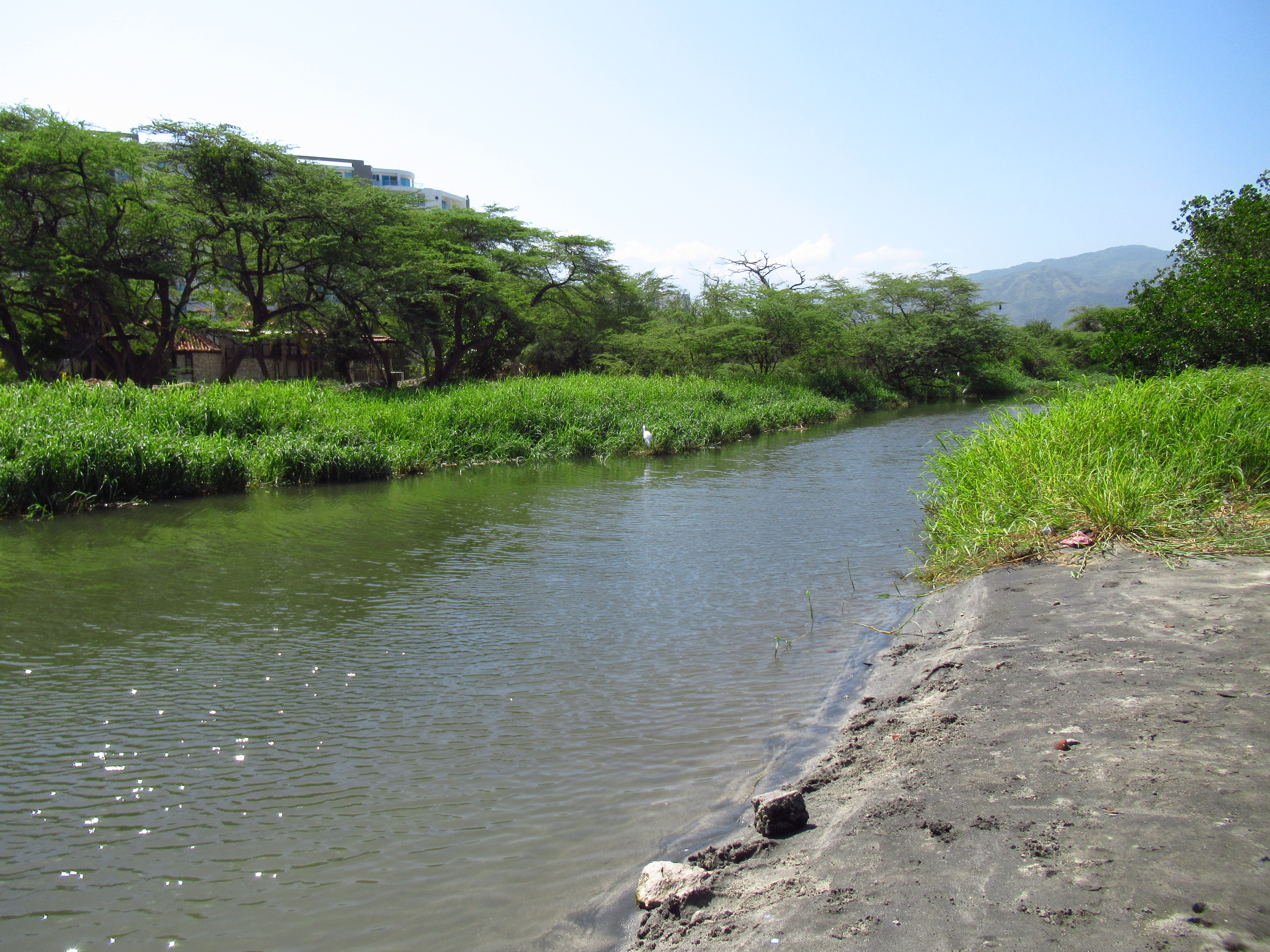
The Gaira River near its mouth at Salguero Beach.

The Gaira-Rodadero sector is bordered to the north by Cerro Ziruma and Locality II (Histórica - Rodrigo de Bastidas). To the south it is bordered by the Gaira River and Cerro de Mamorón, and to the west by the Caribbean Sea.

It is crossed in the south by the lower course of the Gaira River.

=== Climate ===
The climate is warm. The average temperature is 28 °C. A dry environment predominates owing to the breezes coming from the Sierra Nevada de Santa Marta. Several types of vegetation occur, such as tropical humid and dry.

The rainy season runs from June to October, and the dry season from December to April. Precipitation varies between 12 and 975 mm per month.

== Economy ==
The economy of Gaira is based on tourism arriving in El Rodadero, Bello Horizonte and surrounding areas.
