= Playas Canton =

Coordinates: 2.62333°S 80.3875°W

General Villamil
- Canton
- Flag
- Nickname: Playas
- Location of Playas Canton in Guayas Province

- Location of Guayas Province
- Country: Ecuador
- Province: Guayas Province
- Capital: Playas

Government
  - Mayor: Arq. Dany Mite

Area
  - Canton: 270.2 km^{2} (104.3 sq mi)
- Elevation: 3 m (9.8 ft)

Population (2022 census)
  - Canton: 58,768
  - Density: 217.5/km^{2} (563.3/sq mi)
  - Urban: 48,156
- Time zone: UTC-5 (ECT)
- Area code: 593 4
- Website: www.vivaplayas.gov.ec

General Villamil, also known as Playas, is a Guayas canton in Ecuador. The Playas canton is located at the south western area of the Guayas Province. Its Canton Capital is General José de Villamil, also known as Playas. It is located 96 kilómeters from the capital of the Guayas Province, Guayaquil. It borders to the north and east with Guayaquil Canton, on the west with Santa Elena Province, and to south with the Pacific Ocean. Its territory has an area of 270.2 km^{2} (104.3 sq mi) and a population of 58,768.

== Demographics ==
Ethnic groups as of the Ecuadorian census of 2010:

- Mestizo 74.2%
- Afro-Ecuadorian 10.8%
- White 6.6%
- Montubio 4.8%
- Indigenous 1.9%
- Other 1.7%

== Weather ==
Climate data for Santa elena
Month	Jan	Feb	Mar	Apr	May	Jun	Jul	Aug	Sep	Oct	Nov	Dec	Year
Record high °C (°F)	42 (108)	42 (108)	40 (104)	40 (104)	36 (97)	30 (86)	30 (86)	30 (86)	30 (86)	30 (86)	32 (90)	35 (95)	35 (95)
Mean daily maximum °C (°F)	30 (86)	33 (91)	33 (91)	32 (90)	30 (86)	28 (82)	25 (77)	23 (73)	23 (73)	23 (73)	24 (75)	26 (79)	28 (82)
Mean daily minimum °C (°F)	23 (73)	23 (73)	23 (73)	23 (73)	23 (73)	21 (70)	17 (63)	15 (59)	15 (59)	15 (59)	16 (61)	19 (66)	17 (63)
Record low °C (°F)	19 (66)	18 (64)	18 (64)	18 (64)	18 (64)	16 (61)	13 (55)	13 (55)	11 (52)	13 (55)	14 (57)	15 (59)	14 (57)

== Natural resources ==
The terrain at Playas canton is mostly plain, but to the north there are few hills like:

- cerro Colorado
- cerro Picón
- cerro Cantera

It has a large coastline; the main beaches are located to the south. The main rivers in the Playas Canton are: Arena River, Moñones and Tambiche. The weather is hot and dry. The beaches are freshened by the ocean wind.

The land is mostly arid due to the long term droughts and the hot weather. The most common native plant is the algarrobo, which sprouts the algarrobita, used as a high quality energizant. One of the main activities of the canton is fishing. Along with local independent fishermen, there are mostly shrimp and tuna industries. The Ecuadorian sea provides Playas a great variety of fish and seafood that along with the tourism and pool shrimp sowing conform the main activities of its population.

== Tourism ==
Playas, being at 97 kilometers from Guayaquil, receives a large number of tourists from the province capital, as well as from the rest of Ecuador. The canton receives tourism boost on the hot months from January to April, period of time known as "the beach season". Its main festivities, events and carnivals are:

JANUARY

- Cabalgata de los Reyes (Kings Horse riding)

FEBRUARY

- Carnival in Playas
- Election of Carnival's Queen
- International Skate Board championship "Playas Xtreme"

MARCH

- Beach Volleyball Southamerican circuit
- Bicycle racing

APRIL

- Master Championship of Nautic mile
- Surf Championship
- Raft Race

JUNE

- Fishermen "San Pedro" folk holiday

JULY

- Winter "Beach Season" opening

AUGUST

- Celebration and parade for tursm workers.
- Parties in canton-becoming day.

SEPTEMBER

- Merced Virgin honor celebrations.
