= Playas, Ecuador =

Playas
- City
- General Villamil Playas
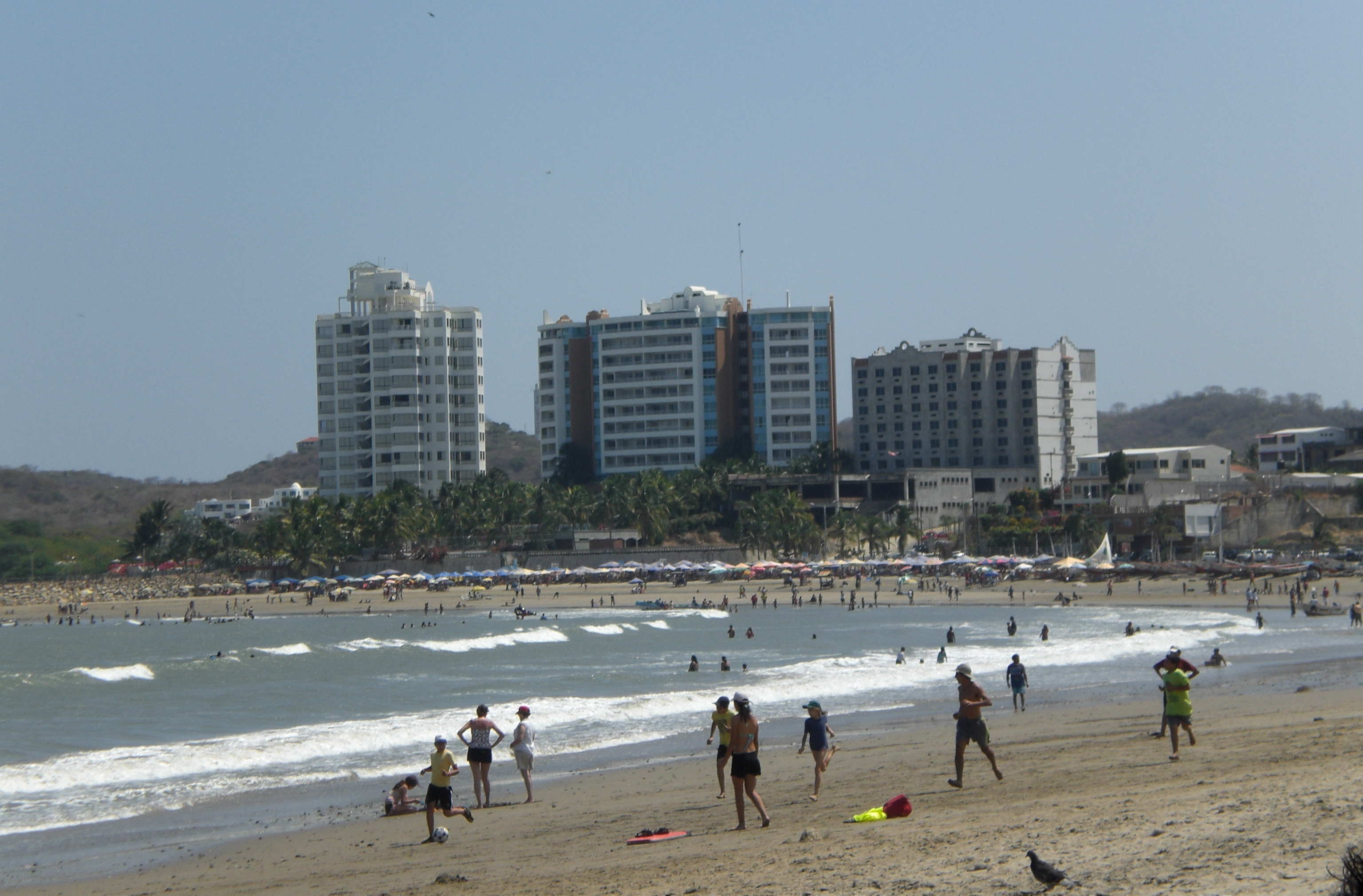
- A beach in Playas

- Flag

- Location within Ecuador
- Coordinates: 2°37′48″S 80°23′24″W
- Country: Ecuador
- Province: Guayas
- Canton: Playas Canton
- Parishes: List of urban parishes

Area
  - City: 16.9 km^{2} (6.5 sq mi)

Population (2022 census)
  - City: 48,156
  - Density: 2,850/km^{2} (7,380/sq mi)
- Time zone: UTC-5 (ECT)
- Climate: Aw

Playas (officially known as General Villamil Playas) is a coastal city located in the province of Guayas, Ecuador. It is the seat of Playas Canton, created in 1989. As of the census of 2022, the city had a population of 48,156. The city takes its official name from the independence hero, General José de Villamil. Playas is an important tourist center and is located approximately 96 km from Guayaquil.

== Economy ==
The economy of Playas is largely tourism based, with a number of hotels and resorts located in the area. The Playas include Playa General Villamil, Paseo Acuático Recinto Data de Villamil, Playa el Arenal, Playa de data de Villamil, and Playa de Puerto Engabao. Aside from tourism, Playas has a thriving fishing community and is known for its seafood cuisine. Playas is also home to the Gómez Rendón Military Academy.

== Climate ==
Climate data for Playas, elevation 6 m (20 ft), (1961–1990)
Month	Jan	Feb	Mar	Apr	May	Jun	Jul	Aug	Sep	Oct	Nov	Dec	Year
Mean daily maximum °C (°F)	30.8 (87.4)	31.5 (88.7)	32.5 (90.5)	31.7 (89.1)	30.2 (86.4)	28.7 (83.7)	27.7 (81.9)	26.3 (79.3)	27.1 (80.8)	27.5 (81.5)	28.0 (82.4)	29.0 (84.2)	29.3 (84.7)
Daily mean °C (°F)	25.7 (78.3)	26.2 (79.2)	26.6 (79.9)	26.2 (79.2)	25.2 (77.4)	23.8 (74.8)	23.2 (73.8)	22.5 (72.5)	22.2 (72.0)	22.7 (72.9)	23.3 (73.9)	24.5 (76.1)	24.3 (75.8)
Mean daily minimum °C (°F)	20.8 (69.4)	21.1 (70.0)	20.7 (69.3)	19.7 (67.5)	19.6 (67.3)	18.7 (65.7)	18.1 (64.6)	17.6 (63.7)	17.7 (63.9)	18.7 (65.7)	18.7 (65.7)	20.1 (68.2)	19.3 (66.8)
Average precipitation mm (inches)	60.0 (2.36)	87.0 (3.43)	154.0 (6.06)	40.0 (1.57)	8.0 (0.31)	2.0 (0.08)	2.0 (0.08)	0.0 (0.0)	2.0 (0.08)	1.0 (0.04)	1.0 (0.04)	4.0 (0.16)	361 (14.21)
Source: FAO

== Photo gallery ==
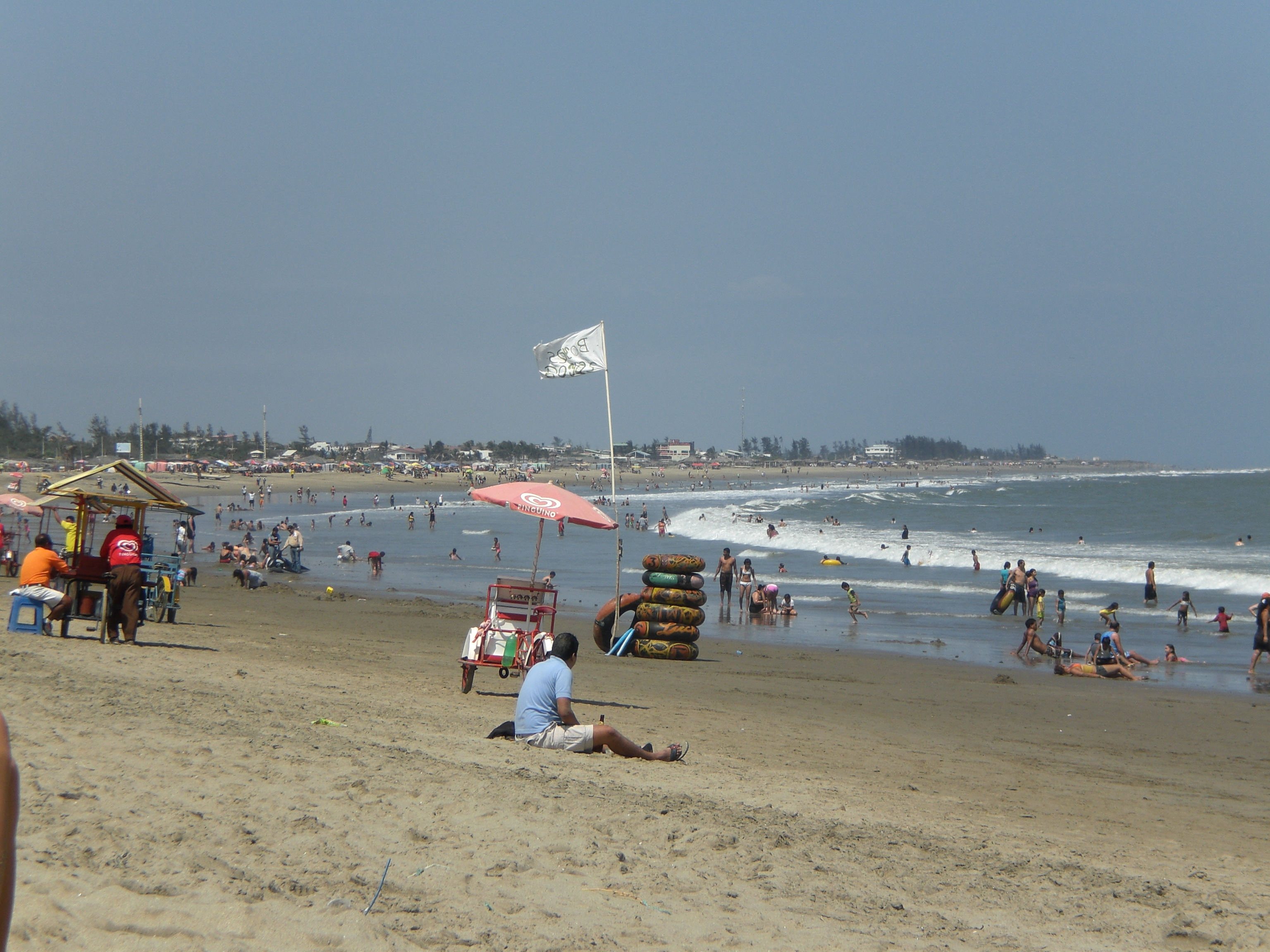
southern view of the beach

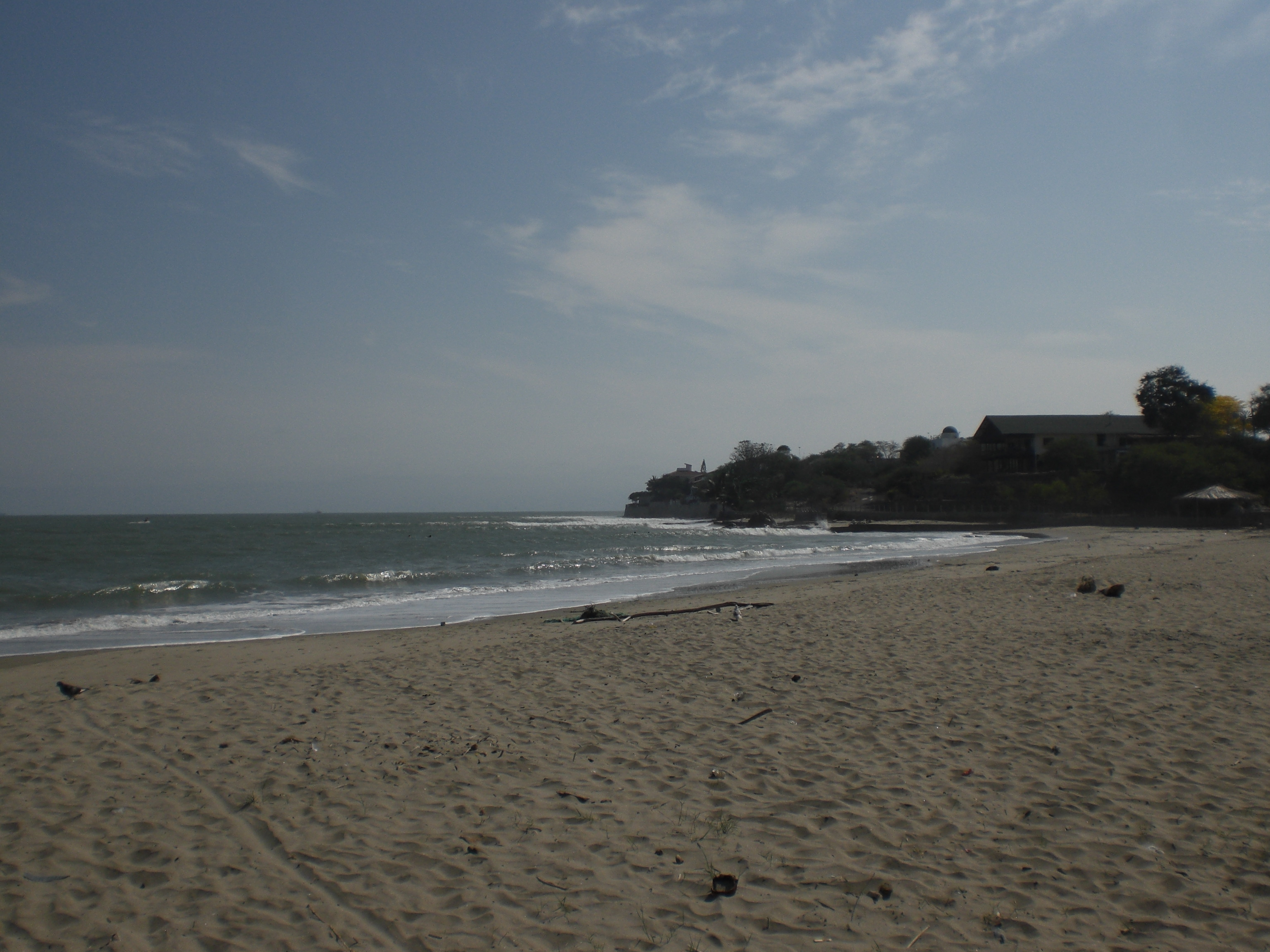
northern view of the beach

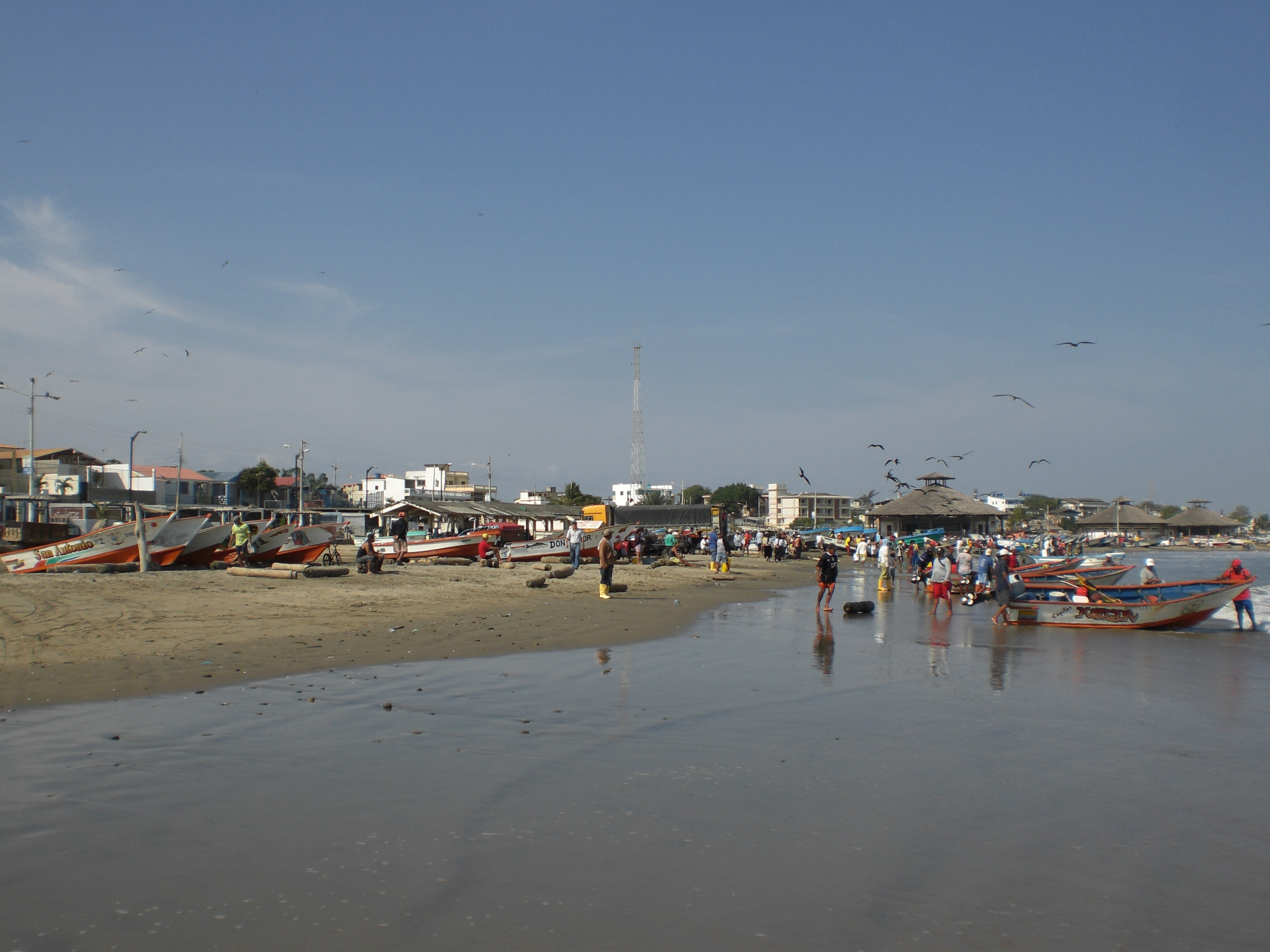
local fishermen
