= Paraguay national beach soccer team =

Paraguay
- Nickname(s): Albirroja (Red and White); Pynandi (Barefoot)
- Association: Paraguayan Football Association
- Confederation: CONMEBOL (South America)
- Head coach: Joaquin Molas
- FIFA code: PAR
- BSWW ranking: 9 (1 June 2026)
First colours
Second colours

First international
- Brazil 17–3 Paraguay (Salvador, Brazil; 12 November 1999)

Biggest defeat
- Brazil 17–3 Paraguay (Salvador, Brazil; 12 November 1999)

World Cup
- Appearances: 6 (first in 2013)
- Best result: Quarterfinals (2017)

CONMEBOL Beach Soccer Championship
- Appearances: 9 (first in 2006)
- Best result: Runners-up (2013, 2015, 2017)
- Website: www.apf.org.py

The Paraguay national beach soccer team represents Paraguay in international beach soccer competitions and is controlled by the APF, the governing body for football in Paraguay. The team debuted in 2013 at the FIFA Beach Soccer World Cup and has been classified since then in all editions as of 2017. Regionally, Paraguay has been one of the strongest teams in South America since 2013.

They are locally known as Pynandi, which is translated as 'barefoot' from guarani language.

== Results and fixtures ==
The following is a list of match results in the last 12 months, as well as any future matches that have been scheduled.

Legend

Win Draw Loss Voided or Postponed Fixture

=== 2022 ===
2 October 2022 2022 South American Games	Paraguay	7–4	Uruguay	Luque, Paraguay
19:55 UTC-3		Report		Stadium: Los Pynandi World Cup Stadium

2 October 2022 2022 South American Games	Paraguay	4–0	Argentina	Luque, Paraguay
19:55 UTC-3		Report		Stadium: Los Pynandi World Cup Stadium

2 October 2022 2022 South American Games	Paraguay	10–3	Venezuela	Luque, Paraguay
19:55 UTC-3		Report		Stadium: Los Pynandi World Cup Stadium

2 October 2022 2022 South American Games	Paraguay	11–4	Peru	Luque, Paraguay
19:55 UTC-3		Report		Stadium: Los Pynandi World Cup Stadium

1 November 2022 Beach Soccer Intercontinental Cup Group B	Paraguay	2–6	Iran	Dubai, UAE
18:45 UTC+4

2 November 2022 Beach Soccer Intercontinental Cup Group B	Japan	5–8	Paraguay	Dubai, UAE
18:45 UTC+4

3 November 2022 Beach Soccer Intercontinental Cup Group B	United States	3–4	Paraguay	Dubai, UAE
18:45 UTC+4

5 November 2022 Beach Soccer Intercontinental Cup Semifinals	Brazil	6–5	Paraguay	Dubai, UAE
18:45 UTC+4

6 November 2022 Beach Soccer Intercontinental Cup 3rd Place	Paraguay	4–1	United Arab Emirates	Dubai, UAE
18:45 UTC+4		Report

9 November 2022 NEOM Beach Games 2022	Paraguay	v	England	Neom, Saudi Arabia
				Stadium: Gayal Beach

10 November 2022 NEOM Beach Games 2022	Paraguay	v	United Arab Emirates	Neom, Saudi Arabia
				Stadium: Gayal Beach

11 November 2022 NEOM Beach Games 2022	Saudi Arabia	v	Paraguay	Neom, Saudi Arabia
				Stadium: Gayal Beach

== Players ==
=== Current squad ===
The following players and staff members were called up for the 2021 FIFA Beach Soccer World Cup.

Note: Flags indicate national team as defined under FIFA eligibility rules; some limited exceptions apply. Players may hold more than one non-FIFA nationality.

No.	Pos.	Nation	Player
1	GK	PAR	Rolando Gonzalez
2	MF	PAR	Sixto Cantero
3	DF	PAR	Gustavo Benitez
4	MF	PAR	Luis Ojeda
5	MF	PAR	Jhovanny Benitez
6	FW	PAR	Pedro Moran
7	MF	PAR	Miciades Medina

No.	Pos.	Nation	Player
8	FW	PAR	Carlos Carballo
9	FW	PAR	Nestor Medina
10	FW	PAR	Valentin Benitez
11	DF	PAR	Sergio Villaverde
12	GK	PAR	Yoao Rolon
13	DF	PAR	Rodrigo Escobar
14	GK	PAR	Alexis Benitez

Head coach: Joaquin Molas
Assistant coach: Eduardo Gonzalez

== Competitive record ==
=== FIFA Beach Soccer World Cup ===
FIFA World Cup record										Qualification (CONMEBOL) record (Note: In 2005 and 2007 merged qualification tournament with CONCACAF)								
Year	Round	Pos	Pld	W	W+	L	GF	GA	GD	Round	Pos	Pld	W	W+	L	GF	GA	GD
(Brazil) 2005	did not enter									did not enter								
(Brazil) 2006	did not qualify									Group stage	5th	5	1	0	4	20	24	–4
(Brazil) 2007	did not enter									did not enter								
(France) 2008	did not qualify									Group stage	6th	2	0	0	2	8	11	–3
(United Arab Emirates) 2009	did not qualify									Group stage	–	3	1	0	2	8	14	–6
(Italy) 2011	did not qualify									Group stage	6th	4	1	1	2	21	32	–11
(French Polynesia) 2013	Group stage	9th	3	1	0	2	14	13	+1	Runners-up	2nd	6	3	0	3	24	24	0
(Portugal) 2015	Group stage	12nd	3	1	0	2	14	16	–2	Runners-up	2nd	6	5	0	1	36	23	+13
(The Bahamas) 2017	Quarterfinals	7th	4	2	0	2	16	14	+2	Runners-up	2nd	6	4	1	1	33	18	+15
(Paraguay) 2019	Group stage	10th	3	1	0	2	15	13	+2	Third place	3rd	6	4	1	1	35	21	+14
(Russia) 2021	Group stage	9th	3	1	0	2	17	15	+2	Third place	3rd	6	4	0	2	25	19	+6
(United Arab Emirates) 2023	did not qualify									Fourth place	4th	6	3	0	3	38	26	+12
(Seychelles) 2025	Group stage	TBD	3	1	0	2	19	21	−2	to be determined								
Total	0 titles	6/13	19	7	0	12	95	92	+3	0 titles	10/12	45	26	3	21	248	212	+36

=== FIFA Beach Soccer World Cup qualification (CONMEBOL) ===
Year	Result
(Brazil) 2006	Group stage (5th)
(Argentina) 2008	Group stage (6th)
(Uruguay) 2009	Group stage (6th)
(Brazil) 2011	Group stage (6th)
(Argentina) 2013	2nd Place
(Ecuador) 2015	2nd Place
(Paraguay) 2017	2nd Place
(Brazil) 2019	3rd Place
(Brazil) 2021	3rd Place
Total	0 titles

=== South American Games/Beach Games ===
Year	Result
(Uruguay) Montevideo 2009	Group stage (7th)
(Ecuador) Manta 2011	2nd Place
(Venezuela) Vargas 2014	2nd Place
(Argentina) Rosario 2019	4th Place
(Paraguay) Asunción 2022	Winner
Total	1 title

=== Beach Soccer Intercontinental Cup ===
Year	Result
(United Arab Emirates) UAE 2017	7th Place
(United Arab Emirates) UAE 2021	7th Place
(United Arab Emirates) UAE 2022	3rd Place
Total	0 title

=== Bolivarian Beach Games ===
Year	Result
(Peru) Lima 2012	Winner
(Peru) Huanchaco 2014	Winner
(Chile) Iquique 2016	2nd Place
Total	2 title
