= 2022 Copa Libertadores de Beach Soccer =

Tournament details
- Host country: Chile
- City: Iquique
- Dates: 18–25 June 2023
- Teams: 12 (from 1 confederation)
- Venue: 1 (in 1 host city)

Final positions
- Champions: (Paraguay) Presidente Hayes (1st title)
- Runners-up: (Brazil) Sampaio Corrêa
- Third place: (Argentina) Acassuso
- Fourth place: (Chile) Alto Hospicio

Tournament statistics
- Matches played: 32
- Goals scored: 242 (7.56 per match)

The 2022 CONMEBOL Libertadores of Beach Soccer was the fifth edition of the Copa Libertadores of Beach Soccer (known natively in Spanish as the Copa Libertadores de Fútbol Playa), an annual continental beach soccer club tournament contested primarily between the champions of the domestic leagues of South American nations who are members of CONMEBOL.

The tournament took place in Iquique, Chile, between 18 and 25 June 2023, and was organised by CONMEBOL in cooperation with the host association, the Football Federation of Chile (FFC). It was the first edition of the Copa Libertadores to take place since 2019, after both the 2020 and 2021 editions were cancelled due to the COVID-19 pandemic in South America; this edition itself was also delayed due to the pandemic, originally scheduled for 26 November to 4 December 2022, then 7 to 14 May 2023, and finally the actual dates the tournament took place.

Brazilians Vasco da Gama were the defending champions but were eliminated at the quarter-finals stage, ultimately finishing fifth. The title was won by Paraguayan club Presidente Hayes, who claimed their first title, also becoming the first non-Brazilian club to win the championship.

== Format ==
As per Regulations Article 15, the competition format consists of two phases: the Preliminary phase (Group phase) and the Final phase.

1. Group phase: The 12 teams are drawn into three groups of four teams; in each group all teams compete in a round robin format. The group winners, runners-up and two best third placed teams advance to the quarter-finals of the final stage.
2. Final phase: The Final phase consists of three knockout rounds (the quarter-finals, semi-finals and final) and consolations rounds (the nations knocked out of title winning contention play in a series of classification matches to decide fifth through twelfth place). All matches in the final stage are played in a knockout format.

== Teams ==
Twelve teams qualified to take part; each of the domestic league champions (or champions of specific Copa Libertadores qualification tournaments) from the ten South American nations which are members of CONMEBOL, plus an additional club from the host country and the defending champions.

Association	Representatives
Argentina	Acassuso
Bolivia	Enabolco
Brazil	Sampaio Corrêa
Brazil	Vasco da Gama
Chile	Alto Hospicio
Chile	Unión Morro
Colombia	Utrahuilca
Ecuador	Playas
Paraguay	Presidente Hayes
Peru	Tito Drago
Uruguay	Malvín
Venezuela	San Antonio

Notes

1. ^{†} As the national association defending champions, Brazil entered two teams.
2. ^{‡} As the host country, Chile received an extra berth and entered two teams.

== Venue ==
Location of Iquique in Chile.

All matches took place at one venue in the city of Iquique, Chile: Arena Cavancha on Cavancha Beach, with a capacity of 1,542.

== Squads ==
Each team had to submit a squad of 12 players, including a minimum of two goalkeepers (Regulations Article 46).

== Draw ==
The draw to split the twelve teams into three groups of four took place on 8 May 2023 at 12:00 PYT (UTC–3) in Luque, Paraguay at the headquarters of CONMEBOL. The draw was conducted based on Regulations Article 17 as follows:

Initially, three teams were seeded and assigned to the head of the groups (Vasco da Gama automatically to Group A, the others via a draw from pot 1):

- To Group A: as reigning champions, (Brazil) Vasco da Gama
- To Group B: as the club of the runner-up national association of the 2019 Copa Libertadores, (Brazil) Sampaio Corrêa
- To Group C: as champions of the host association, (Chile) Alto Hospicio

The remaining nine teams were split into three pots of three based on the final placement of their national association's club in the previous edition of the championship, with the highest three (Paraguay, Argentina and Venezuela) placed in Pot 2, the next three (Colombia, Bolivia and Peru) placed in Pot 3 and the lowest two (Uruguay and Ecuador) in Pot 4, alongside the additional Chilean club. From each pot, the first team drawn was placed into Group A, the second team drawn placed into Group B and the final team drawn placed into Group C. Clubs from the same association could not be drawn into the same group.

The composition of the Pots was as follows:

Pot 1	Pot 2	Pot 3	Pot 4
(Brazil) Sampaio Corrêa; (Chile) Alto Hospicio	(Paraguay) Presidente Hayes; (Argentina) Acassuso; (Venezuela) San Antonio	(Colombia) Utrahuilca; (Bolivia) Enabolco; (Peru) Tito Drago	(Uruguay) Malvín; (Ecuador) Playas; (Chile) Unión Morro

The draw resulted in the following groups:

Group A
Pos	Team
A1	(Brazil) Vasco da Gama
A2	(Paraguay) Presidente Hayes
A3	(Bolivia) Enabolco
A4	(Chile) Unión Morro

Group B
Pos	Team
B1	(Brazil) Sampaio Corrêa
B2	(Argentina) Acassuso
B3	(Peru) Tito Drago
B4	(Venezuela) Playas

Group C
Pos	Team
C1	(Chile) Alto Hospicio
C2	(Venezuela) San Antonio
C3	(Colombia) Utrahuilca
C4	(Uruguay) Malvín

== Referees ==
20 officials were summoned to referee the tournament, representing all CONMEBOL members save for Paraguay. They were announced on 15 June.

== Group stage ==
Each team earns three points for a win in regulation time, two points for a win in extra time, one point for a win in a penalty shoot-out, and no points for a defeat (Regulations Article 23).

The designation of "home" and "away" teams displayed in the results matrices is for administrative purposes only.

Matches took place from 18 to 20 June.

Tie-breakers

If two or more teams are equal on points, their rankings are determined as follows (Regulations Article 24):

1. points obtained in the group matches between the teams concerned;
2. goal difference in the group matches between the teams concerned;
3. number of goals scored in the group matches between the teams concerned;
4. goal difference in all group matches;
5. number of goals scored in all group matches;
6. fewest yellow cards received in all group matches;
7. fewest red cards received in all group matches;
8. drawing of lots by CONMEBOL.

Key

- ^{†} – Walkover
- * – Extra-time result
- ^{♦} – Match decided by penalty shootout

=== Group A ===
Pos	Team	Pld	W	W+	WP	L	GF	GA	GD	Pts	Qualification	PRH	VDG	UNM	ENA
1	(Paraguay) Presidente Hayes	3	3	0	0	0	19	6	+13	9	Knockout stage	—	—	4−1	—
2	(Brazil) Vasco da Gama	3	1	0	1	1	16	10	+6	4	Knockout stage	4–5	—	—	7−0
3	(Chile) Unión Morro	3	1	0	0	2	11	13	−2	3	9th–12th place play-offs	—	5−5^{♦}	—	—
4	(Bolivia) Enabolco	3	0	0	0	3	5	22	−17	0	9th–12th place play-offs	1−10	—	4–5	—

Source: CONMEBOL
Rules for classification: Tie-breakers

=== Group B ===
Pos	Team	Pld	W	W+	WP	L	GF	GA	GD	Pts	Qualification	SAC	ACA	TID	PLA
1	(Brazil) Sampaio Corrêa	3	2	0	0	1	14	4	+10	6	Knockout stage	—	1–2	4−0	—
2	(Argentina) Acassuso	3	2	0	0	1	9	6	+3	6	Knockout stage	—	—	—	4−1
3	(Peru) Tito Drago	3	2	0	0	1	14	12	+2	6	Knockout stage	—	4−3	—	10–5
4	(Ecuador) Playas	3	0	0	0	3	8	23	−15	0	9th–12th place play-offs	2−9	—	—	—

Source: CONMEBOL
Rules for classification: Tie-breakers

=== Group C ===
Pos	Team	Pld	W	W+	WP	L	GF	GA	GD	Pts	Qualification	ALH	MAL	SAN	ULT
1	(Chile) Alto Hospicio	3	2	0	0	1	14	12	+2	6	Knockout stage	—	—	4–2	5−6
2	(Uruguay) Malvín	3	2	0	0	1	14	9	+5	6	Knockout stage	4−5	—	—	—
3	(Venezuela) San Antonio	3	1	0	0	2	7	12	−5	3	Knockout stage	—	2−6	—	—
4	(Colombia) Utrahuilca	3	1	0	0	2	10	12	−2	3	9th–12th place play-offs	—	2–4	2−3	—

Source: CONMEBOL
Rules for classification: Tie-breakers

== 9th–12th place play-offs ==
Per the results of the group stage, the worst third-placed team plays the best-fourth placed team for 9th place; the second best fourth-placed team plays the worst fourth-placed team for 11th place.

11th place match
23 June
(Ecuador) Playas	8
(Bolivia) Enabolco	2

9th place match
23 June
(Chile) Unión Morro (p)	1 (3)
(Colombia) Utrahuilca	1 (2)

== Knockout stage ==
Per the results of the group stage, the top two teams of each group, plus the two best ranked third-placed teams, advance to the quarter-finals. At each stage, the losing teams recede to play in consolatory classification matches to determine their final placement. 21 June was a rest day.

Fifth place
24 June; Report
(Venezuela) San Antonio	1
(Brazil) Vasco da Gama	5
Seventh place
24 June; Report
(Uruguay) Malvín	2
(Peru) Tito Drago	3

5th–8th place semifinals
23 June
(Venezuela) San Antonio	3
(Uruguay) Malvín	2
23 June
(Peru) Tito Drago	6
(Brazil) Vasco da Gama	9

Quarterfinals
22 June; Report
(Paraguay) Presidente Hayes	5
(Venezuela) San Antonio	3
22 June; Report
(Argentina) Acassuso	2
(Uruguay) Malvín	0
22 June; Report
(Brazil) Sampaio Corrêa	6
(Peru) Tito Drago	2
22 June; Report
(Chile) Alto Hospicio	2
(Brazil) Vasco da Gama	1

Semifinals
24 June; Report
(Paraguay) Presidente Hayes	5
(Argentina) Acassuso	1
24 June; Report
(Brazil) Sampaio Corrêa	9
(Chile) Alto Hospicio	4

Final
25 June; Report
(Paraguay) Presidente Hayes (a.e.t.)	6
(Brazil) Sampaio Corrêa	5
Third place
25 June; Report
(Argentina) Acassuso	4
(Chile) Alto Hospicio	3

== Final standings ==
Rank	Team	Result
1	(Paraguay) Presidente Hayes	Champions (1st title)
2	(Brazil) Sampaio Corrêa	Runners-up
3	(Argentina) Acassuso	Third place
4	(Chile) Alto Hospicio	
5	(Brazil) Vasco da Gama	
6	(Venezuela) San Antonio	
7	(Peru) Tito Drago	
8	(Uruguay) Malvín	
9	(Chile) Unión Morro	
10	(Colombia) Utrahuilca	
11	(Ecuador) Playas	
12	(Bolivia) Enabolco	

== See also ==
- 2022 Copa Libertadores de Futsal
- 2022 Euro Winners Cup
