= 2023 South American Under-20 Beach Soccer Championship =

Sudamericano Sub-20 Futbol Playa Chile 2023

Tournament details
- Host country: Chile
- Dates: 6–13 August
- Teams: 10 (from 1 confederation)
- Venue: 1 (in 1 host city)

Final positions
- Champions: Paraguay (1st title)
- Runners-up: Brazil
- Third place: Chile
- Fourth place: Colombia

Tournament statistics
- Matches played: 27
- Goals scored: 221 (8.19 per match)

The 2023 CONMEBOL South American Under-20 Beach Soccer Championship was the third edition of the South American Under-20 Beach Soccer Championship (known natively in Spanish and Portuguese as the CONMEBOL Sub-20 Fútbol Playa), an international youth beach soccer tournament for South American men's national teams comprising players under the age of 20. A biennial event, the tournament took place for the first time in four years after being unable to take place in 2021 due to the effects of the COVID-19 pandemic in South America.

The event took place between 6 and 13 August in Iquique, Chile. The championship was organised by CONMEBOL, the governing body for football in South America, in cooperation with the local organisers, the Football Federation of Chile (FFC).

Argentina were the defending champions, but finished in the last position of the tournament. Paraguay won its first title in the championship.

== Teams ==
Under 20s teams representing all 10 members of CONMEBOL will take part.

- Argentina
- Bolivia
- Brazil
- Chile
- Colombia
- Ecuador
- Paraguay
- Peru
- Uruguay
- Venezuela

== Venue ==
Location of Iquique in Chile.

All matches will take place at one venue in the city of Iquique, Chile: Arena Cavancha on Cavancha Beach, with a capacity of 1,542.

== Squads ==
- Squad size: Each team must submit a squad consisting of 12 players, including two goalkeepers (Regulations Article 44).
- Eligibility: Players can not be older than 20 years, and can not be younger than 16 years, at the end of the calendar year in which the tournament takes place. This means players must be born between 1 January 2003 and 31 December 2007 to be eligible to take part, thereby encompassing an age range of 15–20 at the time of the tournament (Regulations Article 41).

== Draw ==
The draw to split the ten teams into two groups of five took place on 26 June at 12:00 PYT (UTC−3) in Asunción, Paraguay at the headquarters of CONMEBOL. The draw took place under the following procedure:

Initially, two teams were automatically assigned to the groups:

- to Group A: as the host association, Chile
- to Group B: the champions of the previous edition, Argentina

The remaining eight teams were split into four pots of two, shown in the below table.

The teams were seeded based on their final ranking in the previous edition of the South American Under-20 Beach Soccer Championship; the highest ranked teams were placed in Pot 1, next highest in Pot 2 and so on, down to the lowest ranked team placed in Pot 4. From each pot, one team was drawn into Group A and the other team was drawn into Group B.

Pot 1	Pot 2	Pot 3	Pot 4
Brazil; Paraguay	Peru; Ecuador	Colombia; Bolivia	Uruguay; Venezuela

The draw resulted in the following groups:

Group A
Pos	Team
A1	Chile
A2	Paraguay
A3	Ecuador
A4	Bolivia
A5	Uruguay

Group B
Pos	Team
B1	Argentina
B2	Brazil
B3	Peru
B4	Colombia
B5	Venezuela

== Group stage ==
The group stage schedule is defined by Regulations Article 15.

Each team earns three points for a win in regulation time, two points for a win in extra time, one point for a win in a penalty shoot-out, and no points for a defeat (Regulations Article 19). The rankings of teams in each group are determined as follows (Regulations Article 20):

1. points obtained in all group matches;

If two or more teams are equal on the basis of the above criterion, their rankings are determined as follows:

2. points obtained in the group matches between the teams concerned;
3. goal difference in the group matches between the teams concerned;
4. number of goals scored in the group matches between the teams concerned;
5. goal difference in all group matches;
6. number of goals scored in all group matches;
7. fewest yellow cards received in all group matches;
8. fewest red cards received in all group matches;
9. drawing of lots by CONMEBOL.

All times are local, CLT (UTC−3).

=== Group A ===
Pos	Team	Pld	W	W+	WP	L	GF	GA	GD	Pts	Qualification
1	Paraguay	4	4	0	0	0	31	6	+25	12	Knockout stage
2	Chile (H)	4	2	0	1	1	18	13	+5	7	Knockout stage
3	Uruguay	4	2	0	0	2	17	29	−12	6	Fifth place play-off
4	Ecuador	4	1	0	0	3	9	16	−7	3	Seventh place play-off
5	Bolivia	4	0	0	0	4	13	24	−11	0	Ninth place play-off

Updated to match(es) played on 9 August 2023. Source: conmebol.com/conmebol-sub-20-futbol-playa
(H) Host

6 August 2023	Chile	3-3 (a.e.t.) (5–3 p)	Bolivia	Arena Cavancha, Iquique

6 August 2023	Uruguay	4–3	Ecuador	Arena Cavancha, Iquique

7 August 2023	Uruguay	3–8	Chile	Arena Cavancha, Iquique

7 August 2023	Bolivia	2–8	Paraguay	Arena Cavancha, Iquique

8 August 2023	Paraguay	5–0	Ecuador	Arena Cavancha, Iquique

8 August 2023	Bolivia	6–8	Uruguay	Arena Cavancha, Iquique

9 August 2023	Ecuador	1–5	Chile	Arena Cavancha, Iquique

9 August 2023	Paraguay	12–2	Uruguay	Arena Cavancha, Iquique

10 August 2023	Chile	2–6	Paraguay	Arena Cavancha, Iquique

10 August 2023	Ecuador	5–2	Bolivia	Arena Cavancha, Iquique

=== Group B ===
Pos	Team	Pld	W	W+	WP	L	GF	GA	GD	Pts	Qualification
1	Brazil	4	4	0	0	0	33	6	+27	12	Knockout stage
2	Colombia	4	2	0	0	2	12	18	−6	6 (Note: Ranked based on head-to-head result (Peru 1–3 Colombia))	Knockout stage
3	Peru	4	2	0	0	2	15	17	−2	6	Fifth place play-off
4	Venezuela	4	1	0	0	3	12	16	−4	3 (Note: Ranked based on head-to-head result (Venezuela 4–3 Argentina))	Seventh place play-off
5	Argentina	4	1	0	0	3	9	24	−15	3	Ninth place play-off

Updated to match(es) played on 10 August 2023. Source: conmebol.com/conmebol-sub-20-futbol-playa
Notes:

5 August 2023	Peru	3–2	Venezuela	Arena Cavancha, Iquique

5 August 2023	Argentina	3–2	Colombia	Arena Cavancha, Iquique

6 August 2023	Venezuela	4–3	Argentina	Arena Cavancha, Iquique

6 August 2023	Colombia	1–10	Brazil	Arena Cavancha, Iquique

7 August 2023	Brazil	9–3	Peru	Arena Cavancha, Iquique

7 August 2023	Colombia	6–4	Venezuela	Arena Cavancha, Iquique

9 August 2023	Peru	8–3	Argentina	Arena Cavancha, Iquique

9 August 2023	Brazil	4–2	Venezuela	Arena Cavancha, Iquique

10 August 2023	Argentina	0–10	Brazil	Arena Cavancha, Iquique

10 August 2023	Peru	1–3	Colombia	Arena Cavancha, Iquique

== Placement matches ==
The teams finishing in third, fourth and fifth place in the groups are knocked out of title-winning contention; they recede to play in consolatory classification matches to determine fifth through tenth place in the final standings (Regulations Article 18).

=== Ninth place play-off ===
12 August 2023
11:30

Bolivia	3–0	Argentina

Arena Cavancha, Iquique

=== Seventh place play-off ===
12 August 2023
13:15

Ecuador	3–6	Venezuela

Arena Cavancha, Iquique

=== Fifth place play-off ===
13 August 2023
13:45

Uruguay	4–5	Peru

Arena Cavancha, Iquique

== Knockout stage ==
The group winners and runners-up progress to the knockout stage to continue to compete for the title (Regulations Article 18).

Semi-finals
12 August
Paraguay	5
Colombia	3
12 August
Brazil	4
Chile	3

Final
13 August
Paraguay	5
Brazil	3
Third place play-off
13 August
Colombia	4 (2)
Chile (p)	4 (4)

=== Semi-finals ===
12 August 2023
16:15

Paraguay	5–3	Colombia

Arena Cavancha, Iquique

12 August 2023
18:00

Brazil	4–3	Chile

Arena Cavancha, Iquique

=== Third place play-off ===
13 August 2023
15:30

Colombia	4–4 (a.e.t.)	Chile
Penalties
	2–4

Arena Cavancha, Iquique

=== Final ===
13 August 2023
18:00

Paraguay	5–3	Brazil

Arena Cavancha, Iquique

CONMEBOL Sub-20 Fútbol Playa 2023
champions

Paraguay
First title

== Final standings ==
Rank	Team
1	Paraguay
2	Brazil
3	Chile
4	Colombia
5	Peru
6	Uruguay
7	Venezuela
8	Ecuador
9	Bolivia
10	Argentina
