= CR Vasco da Gama (disambiguation) =

CR Vasco da Gama is a professional sports club based in Rio de Janeiro, Brazil.

CR Vasco da Gama may also refer to:

- CR Vasco da Gama (women), a women's association football club based in Rio de Janeiro, Brazil
- CR Vasco da Gama (beach soccer), a men's professional beach soccer team based in Rio de Janeiro, Brazil
- CR Vasco da Gama (basketball), a men's professional basketball club based in Rio de Janeiro, Brazil
