= Los Pynandi World Cup Stadium =

Beach soccer stadium in Paraguay

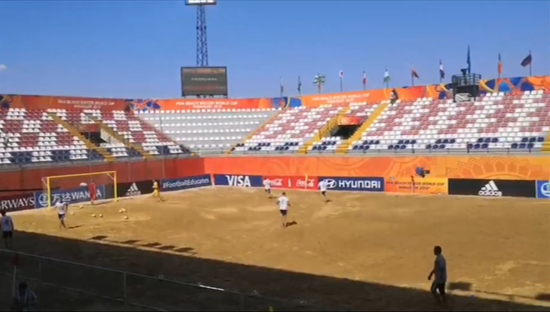
- View from the main stand
- Interactive map of Los Pynandi World Cup Stadium
- Location: Luque, Paraguay
- Coordinates: 25°15′23.7″S 57°31′54.11″W
- Owner: Paraguayan Football Association
- Capacity: 2,820 (Note: Official figures from FIFA. Other sources vary.)
- Surface: Sand

Construction
- Built: January to August 2019
- Opened: 9 November 2019
- Cost: US$1.5 million
- Architect: Rubén García
- Project manager: Dionisio Lovera
- General contractor: Cima-Ritter

Tenant
- Paraguay national beach soccer team (2019–)

Los Pynandi World Cup Stadium (Spanish: Estadio Mundialista Los Pynandi), also known as Arena Pynandi , is a beach soccer stadium in Luque, Gran Asunción, Paraguay. It is located on the grounds of the Paraguayan Olympic Committee and was purpose-built to be the host venue of the 2019 FIFA Beach Soccer World Cup.

== Construction ==
Paraguay's bid to host the 2019 FIFA Beach Soccer World Cup was all but confirmed as successful on 1 October 2018. The Paraguayan Football Association (APF) put the stadium's construction contract out to tender on 15 October which ultimately went to the consortium of Cima-Ritter. Engineer Dionisio Lovera was tasked with coordinating the works, whilst Rubén García is credited as the stadium's architect.

The constructors subsequently broke ground on the designated greenfield host site, on land belonging to the Paraguayan Olympic Committee, in early January 2019, with the full works scheduled to last for seven months. By mid-April, all foundations had been laid, structural columns were in place and the main stand was partially complete, with other stands beginning to be raised; work was described as being on schedule. On 16 July, the site was visited by APF president, Robert Harrison and a selection of FIFA delegates who viewed the progress of works firsthand. In early August, construction had entered its "final phase"; all structural elements were complete, the pitch drainage system functional, and work was now focused on aesthetic and broadcasting elements.

The stadium reportedly cost US$1.5 million to build, with investment from both FIFA and the APF. Its construction created around 200 jobs; the workforce and materials used were all nationally sourced, with the sand comprising the playing field sourced from the banks of the Paraguay River. The structural framework of the stadium is that of reinforced concrete and brick.

== Opening ==
The arena, now completed, first hosted the Paraguay national team for training on 6 September and then hosted the 2019 Copa Libertadores de Beach Soccer tournament from 14–21 September.

However, it was not officially opened until 9 November, two weeks before the World Cup for which it was primarily commissioned, during a ceremony in which FIFA president Gianni Infantino inaugurated the stadium under the name "Los Pynandi World Cup Stadium" (Los Pynandi meaning "barefoot" in Guarani, the nickname of the Paraguay national team). Alongside him was the president of Paraguay, Mario Abdo Benítez, CONMEBOL president Alejandro Domínguez and APF president Robert Harrison, among others, who all made positive statements regarding the design and execution of the construction.

== Facilities ==
The stadium satisfies FIFA requirements for beach soccer venues: the main stand, the only roofed section, includes four changing rooms for players, two changing rooms for referees, a medical area, a press room, offices, a multipurpose space, an anti-doping room and VIP area. There is also designated seating for VIPs, press and high profile/FIFA delegates. Public bathrooms are available in all stands.

Regarding access, the main stand houses an elevator designed for wheelchairs, meanwhile another stand features a special access ramp and an area adapted to accommodate the disabled; consideration has also been given to ambulance and fire access.

The stadium is equipped with TV platforms and floodlights operating at up to 2000 lux. In total, the floor area of the stadium encompasses around 5000m^{2}, with the playing surface accounting for 1,880m^{2}. FIFA reports the final seating capacity figure at 2,820.

At the time of its construction, Ricardo Torres, president of the APF Beach Soccer Division claimed the stadium was the first and only beach soccer stadium of its kind in the world, being of concrete. It is a permanent stadium intended to leave a "legacy for Paraguayan and regional sports".

== Sport events ==
Event	Date
2019 South American Under-20 Championship	8-15 December, 2019
2022 South American Games (Beach soccer, beach volleyball)	1-15 October, 2022
2023 Copa Libertadores de Fútbol Playa	3-10 December, 2023
2024 Copa Libertadores de Fútbol Playa	1-8 December, 2024

== See also ==
- Nassau Stadium, venue constructed to host the 2017 FIFA Beach Soccer World Cup

== Notes ==
Preceded by Nassau Stadium; Nassau, Bahamas	FIFA Beach Soccer; World Cup venue 2019	Succeeded by TBA; Moscow, Russia
