= 2017 Copa Libertadores de Beach Soccer =

Second edition of the Copa Libertadores de Beach Soccer

Tournament details
- Host country: Paraguay
- Dates: 11–18 November 2017
- Teams: 12 (from 1 confederation)
- Venue: 1 (in 1 host city)

Final positions
- Champions: (Brazil) Vasco da Gama (2nd title)
- Runners-up: (Uruguay) Malvín
- Third place: (Paraguay) Universidad Autónoma
- Fourth place: (Paraguay) Garden Club

Tournament statistics
- Matches played: 32
- Goals scored: 325 (10.16 per match)
- Top scorer: (Paraguay) Carlos Carballo (18 goals)
- Best player: (Brazil) Bokinha
- Best goalkeeper: (Argentina) Sebastian Azimonti

The 2017 CONMEBOL Libertadores de Beach Soccer was the second edition of the Copa Libertadores de Beach Soccer (known natively in Spanish as the Copa Libertadores de Futbol Playa), an annual continental beach soccer club tournament contested primarily between the champions of the domestic leagues of South American nations who are members of CONMEBOL.

The tournament was confirmed in December 2015 and was originally organised to take place in Santa Cruz, Bolivia. However, due to "state interference" in the work of the Bolivian Football Federation (FBF), CONMEBOL decided to move the tournament to Lambare, Paraguay in October 2017.

The championship took place between 11 and 18 November in cooperation with the Paraguayan Football Association (APF), which saw an increase of the number of participating teams, up from nine in the first edition to twelve and an additional 12 matches.

Brazilians Vasco da Gama were the defending champions and successfully retained their title, beating Uruguayan side Malvín 8–5 in the final to secure their second Copa Libertadores crown.

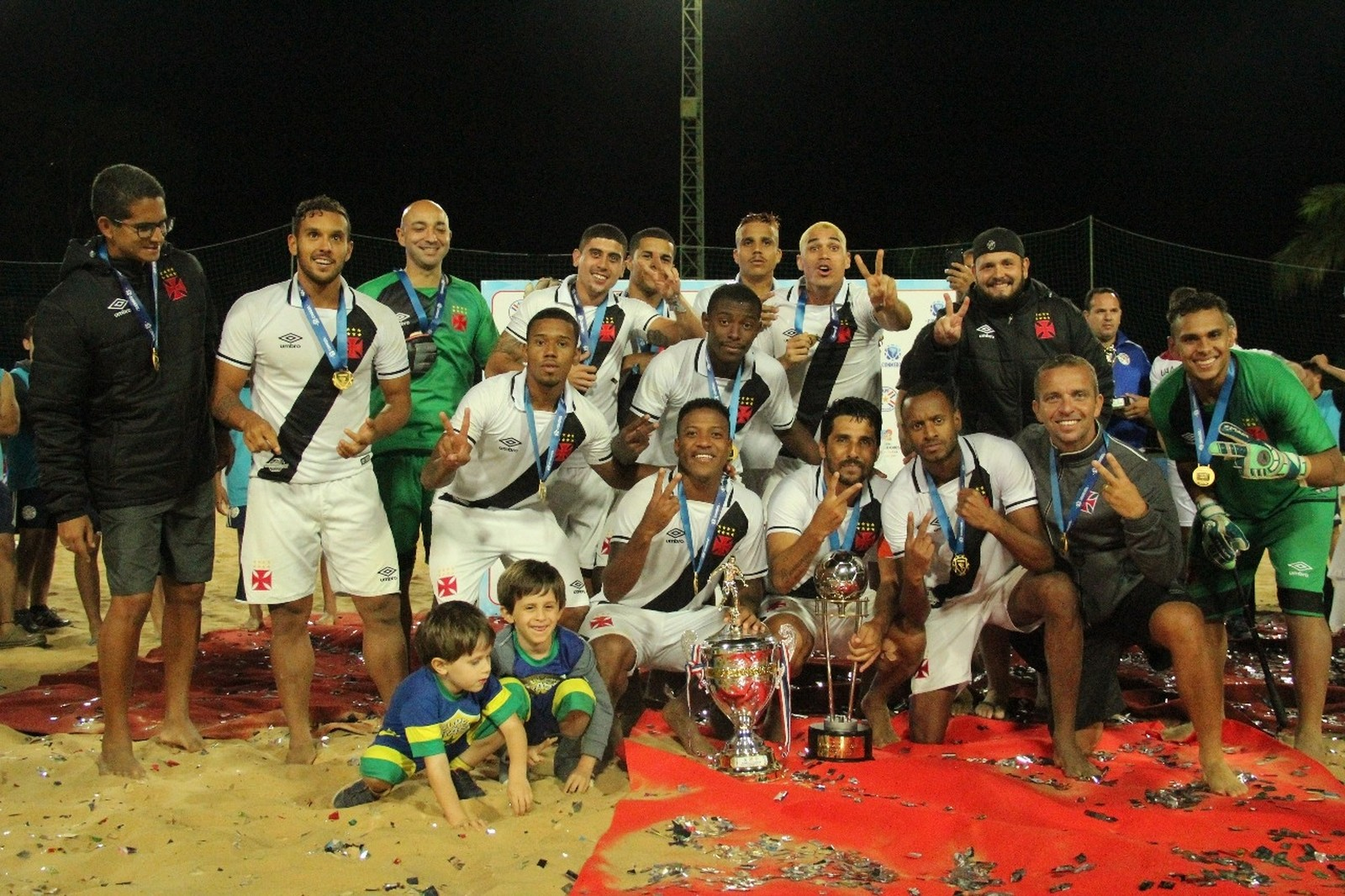
Winning team photo

== Format ==
The tournament started with a group stage, played in a round robin format. The winners, runners-up and two best third placed teams from each group advanced to the knockout stage, in which the teams then competed in single-elimination matches, beginning with the quarter-finals and ending with the final. A third-place deciding match was also contested by the losing semi-finalists. The nations knocked out of title winning contention played in a series of consolation matches to decide fifth through twelfth place.

== Teams ==
Twelve teams qualified to take part; each of the domestic league champions from the ten South American nations which are members of CONMEBOL, plus an additional club from the host country and the defending champions.

Association	Representatives
Argentina	Union Deportivo Provincial
Bolivia	Hamacas FC
(Brazil) Brazil^{1}	Vasco da Gama
(Brazil) Brazil^{1}	Sampaio Corrêa
Chile	Universidad Arturo Prat
Colombia	Deportivo Utrahuilca

Association	Representatives
Ecuador	Delfin Sporting
(Paraguay) Paraguay^{2}	Garden Club
(Paraguay) Paraguay^{2}	Universidad Autónoma
Peru	Ferrocarril
Uruguay	Malvín
Venezuela	Moraga Difalo

1. Vasco da Gama qualified as reigning champions. They were also domestic league champions. Therefore the Brazilian league runners-up, Sampaio Corrêa, took the Brazilian champions berth.
2. Garden club qualified as Paraguayan league champions. As the host country, Paraguay were awarded with a second berth which was given to the domestic league runners-up, Universidad Autónoma.

== Venue ==
Location of Lambare in Paraguay

One venue was used in the city of Lambare, part of the Gran Asunción metro area.

- An arena with a capacity of 3,000 at the Resort Yacht y Golf Club Paraguayo hosted the matches.

This location was also used for two other CONMEBOL beach soccer competitions in 2017; the World Cup qualifiers in February and the South Zone of the Liga Sudamericana in September.

== Squads ==
Each team had to submit a squad of 12 players, including a minimum of two goalkeepers (Regulations Article 3.1).

== Referees ==
Sixteen officials were appointed by CONMEBOL on 1 November, instructed to arrive in Lambare by the 9th.

- (Argentina) Pablo Defelippi
- (Argentina) Dario Colombani
- (Bolivia) Rolando Arteaga
- (Bolivia) Juan Gutierrez
- (Brazil) Lucas Estevão
- (Brazil) Mayron dos Reis
- (Chile) Victor Lara
- (Colombia) Juan Carlos Amaya
- (Ecuador) Wilson Bravo
- (Ecuador) Fabricio Quintero
- (Paraguay) Silvio Coronel
- (Paraguay) Jorge Martinez
- (Peru) Ramon Blanco
- (Peru) Alex Valdiviezo
- (Uruguay) Andres Olivera
- (Venezuela) Luis Eduardo Coy

== Draw ==
The draw to split the twelve teams into three groups of four took place on November 3 in Asunción, Paraguay at the headquarters of the Paraguayan Football Association. The draw was conducted based on Regulations Article 6.3 as follows:

Initially, three teams were automatically assigned to the groups:

- to Group A: runners-up and additional representatives of the host association, (Paraguay) Universidad Autónoma
- to Group B: champions of the host association, (Paraguay) Garden Club
- to Group C: 2016 Copa Libertadores de Beach Soccer champions, (Brazil) Vasco da Gama

The remaining nine teams were split into three pots of three, shown in the below table.

The clubs were seeded based on the final placement of their national association's club in the previous edition of the championship, with the highest seeds placed in Pot 1 and lowest in Pot 3. From each pot, one team was drawn into Group A, one into B and one into C. Teams from the same association could not be drawn into the same group.

Pot 1	Pot 2	Pot 3
(Brazil) Sampaio Corrêa; (Argentina) Union Deportivo Provincial; (Chile) Universidad Arturo Prat	(Peru) Ferrocarril; (Colombia) Deportivo Utrahuilca; (Uruguay) Malvín	(Bolivia) Hamacas FC; (Venezuela) Moraga Difalo; (Ecuador) Delfin Sporting

== Group stage ==
The match schedule was revealed on 8 November.

Each team earns three points for a win in regulation time, two points for a win in extra time, one point for a win in a penalty shoot-out, and no points for a defeat. The top two teams of each group, plus the two best ranked third-placed teams, advance to the quarter-finals. The rankings of teams in each group are determined as follows (Regulations Article 6.2):

1. points obtained in all group matches;

If two or more teams are equal on the basis of the above criterion, their rankings are determined as follows:

2. points obtained in the group matches between the teams concerned;
3. goal difference in the group matches between the teams concerned;
4. number of goals scored in the group matches between the teams concerned;
5. goal difference in all group matches;
6. number of goals scored in all group matches;
7. drawing of lots by CONMEBOL.

All times were local, PYST (UTC–3)

=== Group A ===
Pos	Team	Pld	W	W+	WP	L	GF	GA	GD	Pts	Qualification
1	(Paraguay) Universidad Autónoma	3	2	1	0	0	16	8	+8	8	Knockout stage
2	(Argentina) Union Deportivo Provincial	3	2	0	0	1	15	12	+3	6	Knockout stage
3	(Bolivia) Hamacas FC	3	1	0	0	2	10	11	−1	3	Knockout stage
4	(Colombia) Deportivo Utrahuilca	3	0	0	0	3	8	18	−10	0	9th–12th place play-offs

Source: BSWW

11 November 2017	Deportivo Utrahuilca (Colombia)	2–4	(Bolivia) Hamacas FC	Yacht y Golf Club Paraguayo, Lambare
16:30		Report(es)

11 November 2017	Universidad Autonoma (Paraguay)	6–2	(Argentina) Union Deportivo Provincial	Yacht y Golf Club Paraguayo, Lambare
20:30		Report(es)

12 November 2017	Union Deportivo Provincial (Argentina)	5–3	(Bolivia) Hamacas FC	Yacht y Golf Club Paraguayo, Lambare
17:45		Report(es)

12 November 2017	Universidad Autonoma (Paraguay)	6–3	(Colombia) Deportivo Utrahuilca	Yacht y Golf Club Paraguayo, Lambare
19:00		Report(es)

13 November 2017	Deportivo Utrahuilca (Colombia)	3–8	(Argentina) Union Deportivo Provincial	Yacht y Golf Club Paraguayo, Lambare
16:30		Report(es)

13 November 2017	Universidad Autonoma (Paraguay)	4–3 (a.e.t.)	(Bolivia) Hamacas FC	Yacht y Golf Club Paraguayo, Lambare
20:15		Report(es)

=== Group B ===
Pos	Team	Pld	W	W+	WP	L	GF	GA	GD	Pts	Qualification
1	(Brazil) Sampaio Corrêa	3	3	0	0	0	28	5	+23	9	Knockout stage
2	(Venezuela) Moraga Difalo	3	1	0	1	1	11	22	−11	4	Knockout stage
3	(Paraguay) Garden Club	3	1	0	0	2	16	16	0	3	Knockout stage
4	(Peru) Ferrocarril	3	0	0	0	3	7	19	−12	0	9th–12th place play-offs

Source: BSWW

11 November 2017	Ferrocarril (Peru)	3–4	(Venezuela) Moraga Difalo	Yacht y Golf Club Paraguayo, Lambare
17:45		Report(es)

11 November 2017	Garden Club (Paraguay)	3–7	(Brazil) Sampaio Corrêa	Yacht y Golf Club Paraguayo, Lambare
19:00		Report(es)

12 November 2017	Sampaio Corrêa (Brazil)	13–1	(Venezuela) Moraga Difalo	Yacht y Golf Club Paraguayo, Lambare
16:30		Report(es)

12 November 2017	Garden Club (Paraguay)	7–3	(Peru) Ferrocarril	Yacht y Golf Club Paraguayo, Lambare
20:15		Report(es)

13 November 2017	Sampaio Corrêa (Brazil)	8–1	(Peru) Ferrocarril	Yacht y Golf Club Paraguayo, Lambare
17:45		Report(es)

13 November 2017	Garden Club (Paraguay)	6–6 (a.e.t.) (1–2 p)	(Venezuela) Moraga Difalo	Yacht y Golf Club Paraguayo, Lambare
19:00		Report(es)

=== Group C ===
Pos	Team	Pld	W	W+	WP	L	GF	GA	GD	Pts	Qualification
1	(Brazil) Vasco da Gama	3	3	0	0	0	24	6	+18	9	Knockout stage
2	(Uruguay) Malvín	3	2	0	0	1	11	16	−5	6	Knockout stage
3	(Chile) Universidad Arturo Prat	3	1	0	0	2	14	16	−2	3	9th–12th place play-offs
4	(Ecuador) Delfin Sporting	3	0	0	0	3	7	18	−11	0	9th–12th place play-offs

Source: BSWW

11 November 2017	Malvín (Uruguay)	3–2	(Ecuador) Delfin Sporting	Yacht y Golf Club Paraguayo, Lambare
09:00		Report(es)

11 November 2017	Vasco da Gama (Brazil)	6–3	(Chile) Universidad Arturo Prat	Yacht y Golf Club Paraguayo, Lambare
10:15		Report(es)

12 November 2017	Universidad Arturo Prat (Chile)	7–3	(Ecuador) Delfin Sporting	Yacht y Golf Club Paraguayo, Lambare
09:00		Report(es)

12 November 2017	Vasco da Gama (Brazil)	10–1	(Uruguay) Malvín	Yacht y Golf Club Paraguayo, Lambare
10:15		Report(es)

13 November 2017	Universidad Arturo Prat (Chile)	4–7	(Uruguay) Malvín	Yacht y Golf Club Paraguayo, Lambare
09:00		Report(es)

13 November 2017	Vasco da Gama (Brazil)	8–2	(Ecuador) Delfin Sporting	Yacht y Golf Club Paraguayo, Lambare
10:15		Report(es)

=== Ranking of third-placed teams ===
Pos	Grp	Team	Pld	W	W+	WP	L	GF	GA	GD	Pts	Qualification
1	B	(Paraguay) Garden Club	3	1	0	0	2	16	16	0	3	Knockout stage
2	A	(Bolivia) Hamacas FC	3	1	0	0	2	10	11	−1	3	Knockout stage
3	C	(Chile) Universidad Arturo Prat	3	1	0	0	2	14	16	−2	3	

As per Regulations Article 6.1, it was decided the third place teams would take the following berths in the quarter-final draw:

- 1st Group A vs 2nd best third place team
- 1st Group B vs 1st best third place team
- 1st Group C vs 2nd Group A
- 2nd Group B vs 2nd Group C

== 9th–12th place play-offs ==
The teams finishing in fourth place and one unsuccessful third placed team were knocked out of title-winning contention, receding to play in consolation matches to determine 9th through 12th place in the final standings.

9th–12th place semi-finals
B4	(Peru) Ferrocarril	3
C4	(Ecuador) Delfin Sporting	5
C3	(Chile) Universidad Arturo Prat	10
A4	(Colombia) Deportivo Utrahuilca	5

Ninth place play-off^{[Note1]}
C4	(Ecuador) Delfin Sporting	4
C3	(Chile) Universidad Arturo Prat	2
11th/12th place (not played)
B4	(Peru) Ferrocarril
A4	(Colombia) Deportivo Utrahuilca

=== 9th–12th place semi-finals ===
15 November 2017
09:00

Ferrocarril (Peru)	3–5	(Ecuador) Delfin Sporting
	Report(es)

Yacht y Golf Club Paraguayo, Lambare
15 November 2017
10:15

Universidad Arturo Prat (Chile)	10–5	(Colombia) Deportivo Utrahuilca
	Report(es)

Yacht y Golf Club Paraguayo, Lambare

=== Ninth place play-off^{[Note1]} ===
17 November 2017
09:00

Delfin Sporting (Ecuador)	4–2	(Chile) Universidad Arturo Prat
	Report(es)

Yacht y Golf Club Paraguayo, Lambare

== Knockout stage ==
The group winners, runners-up and two best third placed teams progressed to the knockout stage to continue to compete for the title.

5th place play-off
B2	(Venezuela) Moraga Difalo	3
B1	(Brazil) Sampaio Corrêa	8
7th/8th place (not played)^{[Note1]}
A3	(Bolivia) Hamacas FC
A2	(Argentina) Union Dep. Provincial

5th–8th place semi-finals
B2	(Venezuela) Moraga Difalo	5
A3	(Bolivia) Hamacas FC	3
A2	(Argentina) Union Dep. Provincial	2
B1	(Brazil) Sampaio Corrêa	9

Quarter finals
B2	(Venezuela) Moraga Difalo	4
C2	(Uruguay) Malvín	7
A1	(Paraguay) Universidad Autonoma	11
A3	(Bolivia) Hamacas FC	3
C1	(Brazil) Vasco da Gama	7
A2	(Argentina) Union Dep. Provincial	4
B1	(Brazil) Sampaio Corrêa	5
B3	(Paraguay) Garden Club	6

Semi-finals
C2	(Uruguay) Malvín (a.e.t.)	5
A1	(Paraguay) Universidad Autonoma	4
C1	(Brazil) Vasco da Gama	10
B3	(Paraguay) Garden Club	4

Final
C2	(Uruguay) Malvín	5
C1	(Brazil) Vasco da Gama	8
3rd place play-off
A1	(Paraguay) Universidad Autonoma	9
B3	(Paraguay) Garden Club	7

=== Quarter finals ===
The losers recede to play in consolation matches to determine 5th through 8th place in the final standings.

The winners proceed to continue to compete for the title.

15 November 2017
16:30

Moraga Difalo (Venezuela)	4–7	(Uruguay) Malvín
	Report(es)

Yacht y Golf Club Paraguayo, Lambare
15 November 2017
17:15

Universidad Autonoma (Paraguay)	11–3	(Bolivia) Hamacas FC
	Report(es)

Yacht y Golf Club Paraguayo, Lambare
15 November 2017
19:00

Vasco da Gama (Brazil)	7–4	(Argentina) Union Deportivo Provincial
	Report(es)

Yacht y Golf Club Paraguayo, Lambare
15 November 2017
20:30

Sampaio Corrêa (Brazil)	5–6	(Paraguay) Garden Club
	Report(es)

Yacht y Golf Club Paraguayo, Lambare

=== Semi-finals ===
==== 5th–8th place ====
The quarter final losers.

16 November 2017
17:00

Hamacas FC (Bolivia)	3–5	(Venezuela) Moraga Difalo
	Report(es)

Yacht y Golf Club Paraguayo, Lambare
16 November 2017
18:15

Union Deportivo Provincial (Argentina)	2–9	(Brazil) Sampaio Corrêa
	Report(es)

Yacht y Golf Club Paraguayo, Lambare

==== 1st–4th place ====
The quarter final winners.

16 November 2017
19:30

Universidad Autonoma (Paraguay)	4–5 (a.e.t.)	(Uruguay) Malvín
	Report(es)

Yacht y Golf Club Paraguayo, Lambare
16 November 2017
20:45

Vasco da Gama (Brazil)	10–4	(Paraguay) Garden Club
	Report(es)

Yacht y Golf Club Paraguayo, Lambare

=== Finals ===
==== Fifth place play-off ====
The 5th–8th place semi-final winners.

17 November 2017
10:15

Moraga Difalo (Venezuela)	3–8	(Brazil) Sampaio Corrêa
	Report(es)

Yacht y Golf Club Paraguayo, Lambare

==== Third place play-off ====
The 1st–4th place semi-final losers.

18 November 2017
19:00

Universidad Autonoma (Paraguay)	9–7	(Paraguay) Garden Club
	Report(es)

Yacht y Golf Club Paraguayo, Lambare

==== Championship final ====
The 1st–4th place semi-final winners.

18 November 2017
20:15

Malvín (Uruguay)	5–8	(Brazil) Vasco da Gama
	Report(es)

Yacht y Golf Club Paraguayo, Lambare

== Awards ==
Top scorer
(Paraguay) Carlos Carballo ( (Paraguay) Garden Club)
18 goals
Best player
(Brazil) Bokinha ( (Brazil) Vasco da Gama)
Best goalkeeper
(Argentina) Sebastian Azimonti ( (Uruguay) Malvín)

Source Archived 2017-11-21 at the Wayback Machine

== Top goalscorers ==
Players with 6 or more goals

18 goals

- (Paraguay) Carlos Carballo ( (Paraguay) Garden Club)

13 goals

- (Paraguay) Pedro Moran ( (Paraguay) Universidad Autonoma)

11 goals

- (Brazil) Lucão ( (Brazil) Vasco da Gama)
- (Brazil) Serginho ( (Brazil) Sampaio Corrêa)

10 goals

- (Venezuela) Alex Vaamonde ( (Venezuela) Moraga Difalo)

9 goals

- (Brazil) Bruno Xavier ( (Brazil) Sampaio Corrêa)

8 goals

- (Paraguay) Jesús Amado Rolón ( (Paraguay) Universidad Autonoma)
- (Brazil) Catarino ( (Brazil) Vasco da Gama)

7 goals

- (Brazil) Bokinha ( (Brazil) Vasco da Gama)
- (Ecuador) Daniel E Cedeño ( (Ecuador) Defin Sporting)

6 goals

- (Brazil) Eudin ( (Brazil) Sampaio Corrêa)
- (Brazil) Felipe ( (Brazil) Sampaio Corrêa)
- (Bolivia) Julio Zambrano ( (Bolivia) Hamacas FC)
- (Venezuela) Alberto Muñoz ( (Venezuela) Moraga Difalo)

Source:APF

== Final standings ==
Rank	Team	Result
1	(Brazil) Vasco da Gama	Champions (2nd title)
2	(Uruguay) Malvín	Runners-up
3	(Paraguay) Universidad Autónoma	Third place
4	Garden Club	
5	Sampaio Corrêa	
6	Moraga Difalo	
7	(Argentina) Union Deportivo Provincial	^{[Note1]}
8	(Bolivia) Hamacas FC	^{[Note1]}
9	(Ecuador) Delfin Sporting	^{[Note1]}
10	(Chile) Universidad Arturo Prat	^{[Note1]}
11	Ferrocarril	
12	Deportivo Utrahuilca	

Note1 The official CONMEBOL match schedule has the match of Defin v Arturo Prat as the match for 9th and 10th place, with the losers of the 5th-8th place semi-finals (Deportivo Provincial, Hamacas) finishing in 7th and 8th place. The article has been written based on this information, including the ranking of teams shown in the final standings for 7th-10th place. However, note the match report issued by the co-organisers claims the Defin v Artuo Prat match was actually for 7th and 8th place, with the losers of the 5th-8th place semi-finals finishing in 9th and 10th. In this case, the final standings would be (7. Delfin, 8. Arturo Prat 9. Deportivo Provincial, 10. Hamacas)
