= 2023 Copa Libertadores de Fútbol Playa =

2023 CONMEBOL Libertadores Fútbol Playa
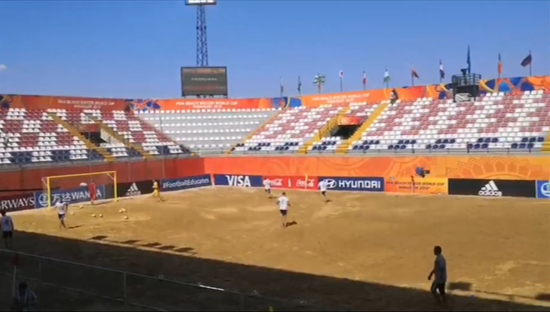
- All matches will be played at Los Pynandi World Cup Stadium.

Tournament details
- Host country: Paraguay
- City: Luque
- Dates: 3–10 December 2023
- Teams: 12 (from 1 confederation)
- Venue: 1 (in 1 host city)

The 2023 CONMEBOL Libertadores Fútbol Playa was the sixth edition of the Copa Libertadores de Fútbol Playa, an annual continental beach soccer club tournament contested primarily between the champions of the domestic leagues of South American nations who are members of CONMEBOL.

The tournament took place in Luque, Paraguay, at Los Pynandi World Cup Stadium, between 3 and 10 December 2023, and was organised by CONMEBOL in cooperation with the host association, the Paraguayan Football Association.

Paraguayan club Presidente Hayes were the defending champions, they reached the final again but lost against San Antonio.

== Format ==
As per Regulations Article 15, the competition format consists of two phases: the Preliminary phase (Group phase) and the Final phase.

1. Group phase: The 12 teams are drawn into three groups of four teams; in each group all teams compete in a round robin format. The group winners, runners-up and two best third placed teams advance to the quarter-finals of the final stage.
2. Final phase: The Final phase consists of three knockout rounds (the quarter-finals, semi-finals and final) and consolations rounds (the nations knocked out of title winning contention play in a series of classification matches to decide fifth through twelfth place). All matches in the final stage are played in a knockout format.

== Teams ==
Twelve teams qualified to take part; each of the domestic league champions (or champions of specific Copa Libertadores qualification tournaments) from the ten South American nations which are members of CONMEBOL, plus an additional club from the host country and the defending champions.

Association	Representatives
Argentina	Acassuso
Bolivia	Hamacas
Brazil	Sampaio Corrêa
Chile	Camba Pizzero
Colombia	Antioquia
Ecuador	Victoria Andrés
Paraguay	Presidente Hayes
Paraguay	Libertad
Paraguay	San Antonio
Peru	Unión Lurín
Uruguay	Cerrito
Venezuela	Guaicamacuto

Notes

1. ^{†} As the national association defending champions and also as the host country, Paraguay entered three teams.

== Venue ==
All matches will take place at Los Pynandi World Cup Stadium of the Parque Olímpico in the city of Luque, near the capital city Asunción, in Paraguay. The stadium has a capacity of 2,820.

== Group stage ==
=== Group A ===
Pos	Team	Pld	W	W+	WP	L	GF	GA	GD	Pts	Qualification	ULU	PHA	GUA	HAM
1	(Peru) Unión Lurín	3	1	1	1	0	14	8	+6	6	Knockout stage	—			—
2	(Paraguay) Presidente Hayes	3	2	0	0	1	12	9	+3	6	Knockout stage	—	—	—	5–1
3	(Venezuela) Guaicamacuto	3	1	0	0	2	12	9	+3	3	Knockout stage	—		—	
4	(Bolivia) Hamacas	3	0	0	0	3	4	16	−12	0	9th–12th place play-offs	2–6	—	—	—

Source: CONMEBOL
Rules for classification: Tie-breakers

=== Group B ===
Pos	Team	Pld	W	W+	WP	L	GF	GA	GD	Pts	Qualification	LIB	ANT	CPI	VAN
1	(Paraguay) Libertad	3	2	0	0	1	25	12	+13	6	Knockout stage	—			—
2	(Colombia) Antioquia	3	2	0	0	1	9	5	+4	6	Knockout stage	—	—	—	
3	(Chile) Camba Pizzero	3	2	0	0	1	25	20	+5	6	Knockout stage	—		—	
4	(Ecuador) Victoria Andrés	3	0	0	0	3	9	31	−22	0	9th–12th place play-offs		—	—	—

Source: CONMEBOL
Rules for classification: Tie-breakers

=== Group C ===
Pos	Team	Pld	W	W+	WP	L	GF	GA	GD	Pts	Qualification	SCO	SAN	ACA	CRT
1	(Brazil) Sampaio Corrêa	3	3	0	0	0	18	8	+10	9	Knockout stage	—			—
2	(Paraguay) San Antonio	3	2	0	0	1	13	15	−2	6	Knockout stage	—	—	—	
3	(Argentina) Acassuso	3	0	1	0	2	11	12	−1	2	9th–12th place play-offs	—		—	
4	(Uruguay) Cerrito	3	0	0	0	3	9	16	−7	0	9th–12th place play-offs		—	—	—

Source: CONMEBOL
Rules for classification: Tie-breakers

== 9th–12th place play-offs ==
Per the results of the group stage, the worst third-placed team plays the best-fourth placed team for 9th place; the second best fourth-placed team plays the worst fourth-placed team for 11th place.

11th place match
8 December
(Bolivia) Hamacas	3
(Ecuador) Victoria Andrés	2

9th place match
8 December
(Argentina) Acassuso	2
(Uruguay) Cerrito	4

== Knockout stage ==
Per the results of the group stage, the top two teams of each group, plus the two best ranked third-placed teams, advance to the quarter-finals. At each stage, the losing teams recede to play in consolatory classification matches to determine their final placement.

Fifth place
(Colombia) Antioquia	5
(Brazil) Sampaio Corrêa	4
Seventh place
(Venezuela) Guaicamacuto (p)	3 (4)
(Chile) Camba Pizzero	3 (3)

Consolation semifinals
(Venezuela) Guaicamacuto	2
(Colombia) Antioquia	4
(Chile) Camba Pizzero	1
(Brazil) Sampaio Corrêa	4

Quarterfinals
7 December
(Peru) Unión Lurín	5
(Venezuela) Guaicamacuto	3
7 December
(Colombia) Antioquia	4
(Paraguay) San Antonio	6
7 December
(Paraguay) Libertad	5
(Chile) Camba Pizzero	4
7 December
(Brazil) Sampaio Corrêa	5
(Paraguay) Presidente Hayes	7

Semifinals
(Peru) Unión Lurín	1
(Paraguay) San Antonio	3
(Paraguay) Libertad	3
(Paraguay) Presidente Hayes	5

Final
(Paraguay) San Antonio	3
(Paraguay) Presidente Hayes	1
Third place
(Peru) Unión Lurín	5
(Paraguay) Libertad	8

== Final standings ==
Rank	Team
1	(Paraguay) San Antonio
2	(Paraguay) Presidente Hayes
3	(Paraguay) Libertad
4	(Peru) Unión Lurín
5	(Colombia) Antioquia
6	(Brazil) Sampaio Corrêa
7	(Venezuela) Guaicamacuto
8	(Chile) Camba Pizzero
9	(Uruguay) Cerrito
10	(Argentina) Acassuso
11	(Bolivia) Hamacas
12	(Ecuador) Victoria Andrés

== See also ==
- 2023 Copa Libertadores
- 2023 Copa Libertadores de Futsal
- 2023 Euro Winners Cup
