= 2019 South American Under-20 Beach Soccer Championship =

Sudamericano Sub-20 Futbol Playa Paraguay 2019

Tournament details
- Host country: Paraguay
- Dates: 8–15 December
- Teams: 9 (from 1 confederation)
- Venue(s): 1 (in 1 host city)

Final positions
- Champions: Argentina (1st title)
- Runners-up: Brazil
- Third place: Paraguay
- Fourth place: Peru

Tournament statistics
- Matches played: 22
- Goals scored: 194 (8.82 per match)

The 2019 CONMEBOL South American Under-20 Beach Soccer Championship was the second edition of the South American Under-20 Beach Soccer Championship (known natively in Spanish as the Sudamericano Sub-20 Futbol Playa), an international youth beach soccer tournament for South American national teams of men under the age of 20.

The championship was organised by CONMEBOL, the governing body for football in South America, in cooperation with the local organisers, the Paraguayan Football Association (APF). The event took place between 8 and 15 December in Luque, Gran Asuncion, Paraguay.

Brazil were the defending champions but lost to Argentina in the final who claimed their first title in what was a repeat of the final of the previous edition, but with the reverse outcome.

== Teams ==
Under 20s teams representing nine of the 10 members of CONMEBOL took part.

Due to "force majeure", Venezuela were the only team not participating.

- Argentina
- Bolivia
- Brazil
- Chile
- Colombia
- Ecuador
- Paraguay
- Peru
- Uruguay

== Venue ==
Above: View of stadium from the main stand Right: Location of Luque in Paraguay.	2019 South American Under-20 Beach Soccer Championship is located in Paraguay

One venue was used in the city of Luque, Gran Asunción.

- All matches took place at Los Pynandi World Cup Stadium, newly built to primarily host the 2019 FIFA Beach Soccer World Cup, located on the grounds of the Paraguayan Olympic Committee with a capacity of 2,820.

== Squads ==
Each team must have submit a squad consisting of 12 players, of individuals no older than 20 years.

== Draw ==
The draw to split the ten teams into two groups, one of five and one of four, took place on 19 November at 17:00 PYST (UTC−3) in Asunción, Paraguay at the headquarters of the APF.

Initially, two teams were automatically assigned to the groups:

- to Group A: as the host association, Paraguay
- to Group B: the champions of the previous edition, Brazil

The remaining seven teams were split into four pots, three of two and one of one, shown in the below table.

The teams were seeded based on their final ranking in the previous edition of the South American Under-20 Beach Soccer Championship; the highest ranked teams were placed in Pot 1, next highest in Pot 2 and so on, down to the lowest ranked team placed in Pot 4. From each pot, one team was drawn into Group A and the other team was drawn into Group B. The single team in Pot 4 was drawn into one of the groups at random.

Pot 1	Pot 2	Pot 3	Pot 4
Argentina; Colombia	Uruguay; Bolivia	Peru; Ecuador	Chile

== Group stage ==
The match schedule was announced on 27 November.

All times are local, PYST (UTC−3).

=== Group A ===
Pos	Team	Pld	W	W+	WP	L	GF	GA	GD	Pts	Qualification
1	Paraguay (H)	3	2	0	0	1	21	12	+9	6	Knockout stage
2	Peru	3	2	0	0	1	12	10	+2	6	Knockout stage
3	Colombia	3	1	1	0	1	13	11	+2	5	Fifth place play-off
4	Bolivia	3	0	0	0	3	5	18	−13	0	Seventh place play-off

Source: CONMEBOL
(H) Host

8 December 2019	Colombia	6–2	Bolivia	Los Pynandi World Cup Stadium, Luque
20:00	Londoño 1'; Córdoba 1'; Hernández 5', 35'; Acosta 11'; Narváez 23'	Report	5' Beltrán; 27' Melgarejo	Referee: José Cortez (Ecuador)

8 December 2019	Paraguay	7–5	Peru	Los Pynandi World Cup Stadium, Luque
21:30	Thompson 6'; C. Benítez 2', 17', 18'; J. Benítez 15', 29'; Medina 36'	Report	8' Manco; 8', 28', 32' Vásquez; 6' Marín	Referee: Pablo Cadenasso (Uruguay)

10 December 2019	Colombia	2–5	Peru	Los Pynandi World Cup Stadium, Luque
20:00	Hernández 12'; Acosta 29'	Report	2' Carpio; 3' Vásquez; 6' Manco; 24', 31' Mori	Referee: Mariano Defelippi (Argentina)

10 December 2019	Paraguay	10–2	Bolivia	Los Pynandi World Cup Stadium, Luque
21:30	J. Benítez 2'; C. Benítez 12', 12', 26', 26', 29', 36', 36'; Medina 21'; Echeverría 29'	Report	35' Montes; 35' Melgarejo	Referee: Lucas Estevão (Brazil)

12 December 2019	Bolivia	1–2	Peru	Los Pynandi World Cup Stadium, Luque
20:00	Cervantes 33'	Report	13' Vasquez; 34' Mori	Referee: Brandon Amay (Ecuador)

12 December 2019	Paraguay	4–5 (a.e.t.)	Colombia	Los Pynandi World Cup Stadium, Luque
21:30	Echeverría 13', 18'; J. Benítez 25'; Candia 26'	Report	8', 34' C. Hernández; 27', 35', 37' Acosta	Referee: José Cortez (Ecuador)

=== Group B ===
Pos	Team	Pld	W	W+	WP	L	GF	GA	GD	Pts	Qualification
1	Argentina	4	4	0	0	0	18	10	+8	12	Knockout stage
2	Brazil	4	3	0	0	1	21	12	+9	9	Knockout stage
3	Ecuador	4	2	0	0	2	26	16	+10	6	Fifth place play-off
4	Chile	4	1	0	0	3	18	26	−8	3	Seventh place play-off
5	Uruguay	4	0	0	0	4	8	27	−19	0	

Source: CONMEBOL

8 December 2019	Argentina	5–4	Chile	Los Pynandi World Cup Stadium, Luque
17:00	Ponzetti 6', 8'; Maciel 18'; Bravo 26'; Gigena 36'	Report	3' Tobar; 17', 33', 36' Oyarzun

8 December 2019	Brazil	5–4	Ecuador	Los Pynandi World Cup Stadium, Luque
18:30	Betinho 8'; Miranda 23'; Alisson 32', 32', 36'	Report	3' Delgado; 8' Klinger; 30' Vinces; 33' Carrera	Referee: Silvio Coronel (Paraguay)

9 December 2019	Ecuador	8–4	Chile	Los Pynandi World Cup Stadium, Luque
18:30	Delgado 2'; Klinger 7', 13'; Vinces 9'; Macias 15'; Carrera 16'; Lucas 28', 29'	Report	8' Oyarzun; 23' Ponce; 17' Tobar; 33' San Martín	Referee: Jesús Reyes (Venezuela)

9 December 2019	Brazil	4–0	Uruguay	Los Pynandi World Cup Stadium, Luque
20:00	Alisson 21'; Orosso 23', 36'; Carlinhos 33'	Report		Referee: Ramón Blanco (Peru)

10 December 2019	Argentina	4–2	Ecuador	Los Pynandi World Cup Stadium, Luque
17:00	Pomar 7'; Gigena 24'; Ponzetti 24', 25'	Report	20' Lucas; 23' Klinger	Referee: Micke Palomino (Peru)

10 December 2019	Uruguay	3–6	Chile	Los Pynandi World Cup Stadium, Luque
18:30	Lozano 23'; Quinta 35'; Teliz 31'	Report	3', 8', 9' Tobar; 7' Ponce; 12' Núñez; 23' Garjado	Referee: Jorge Martínez (Paraguay)

11 December 2019	Argentina	5–2	Uruguay	Los Pynandi World Cup Stadium, Luque
18:30	Blumberg 7'; Ponzetti 17'; Pomar 18'; González 20'; Maciel 33'	Report	12' Lozano; 33' Quinta	Referee: Ramón Blanco (Peru)

11 December 2019	Brazil	10–4	Chile	Los Pynandi World Cup Stadium, Luque
20:00	Thiago Dias 1'; Alisson 3', 23', 36'; Wesley 6'; Orosso 14'; Betinho 28', 28', 29'; Iguinho 31'	Report	28' Carvajal; 31' Oyarzun; 32' Garjado; 33' Tobar	Referee: Luis Coy (Venezuela)

12 December 2019	Uruguay	3–12	Ecuador	Los Pynandi World Cup Stadium, Luque
17:00	Roibal ?'; A. Rodríguez ?', ?'	Report	?', ?' Macías; ?', ?', ?', ?' Carrera; ?' Lucas; ?' Moreira; ?', ?' Delgado; ?' Klinger; ?' Farías	Referee: Marlon Dos Reis (Brazil)

12 December 2019	Brazil	2–4	Argentina	Los Pynandi World Cup Stadium, Luque
18:30	Thiago Dias 8'; Gabriel 20'	Report	14' Ponzetti; 20' Pomar; 27' Cipolletta; 33' A. González	Referee: Silvio Coronel (Paraguay)

== Placement matches ==
The teams finishing in third, fourth and fifth place in the groups are knocked out of title-winning contention; the four teams in the former two positions recede to play in consolatory placement matches to determine 5th through 8th place in the final standings.

=== Seventh place play-off ===
15 December 2019
08:00

Bolivia	5–7	Chile
Beltrán ?'; Escobar ?'; Melgarejo ?', ?'; Giles ?'	Report	?', ?', ?', ?' Tobar; ?' Carvajal; ?' Beltrán; ?' Ponce

Los Pynandi World Cup Stadium, Luque
Referee: Gabriel Maidana (Argentina)

=== Fifth place play-off ===
15 December 2019
09:30

Colombia	1–2	Ecuador
Acosta ?'	Report	?' Farías; ?' Macías

Los Pynandi World Cup Stadium, Luque
Referee: José Mendoza (Bolivia)

== Knockout stage ==
The group winners and runners-up progress to the knockout stage to continue to compete for the title.

Semi-finals
14 December
Argentina	7
Peru	4
14 December
Paraguay	4
Brazil	5

Final
15 December
Argentina	5
Brazil	3
Third place play-off
15 December
Peru	4
Paraguay	5

=== Semi-finals ===
14 December 2019
18:00

Argentina	7–4	Peru
Gigena; Pomar ?', ?'; Ponzetti; Cipolletta ?', ?'; A. González	Report	Mori; ?', ?' Carpio; Sialer

Los Pynandi World Cup Stadium, Luque
Referee: Brandon Amay (Ecuador)

14 December 2019
19:30

Paraguay	4–5	Brazil
Candia; Medina; Echeverría; C. Benítez	Report	?', ?' Andrey; Carlinhos; Thiago Dias; Alisson

Los Pynandi World Cup Stadium, Luque
Referee: Jaimito Suárez (Bolivia)

=== Third place play-off ===
15 December 2019
18:00

Peru	4–5	Paraguay
Vasquez ?'; Puelles ?'; Mori ?', ?'	Report	?' Candia; ?', ?' C. Benítez; ?', ?' Medina

Los Pynandi World Cup Stadium, Luque
Referee: Lucas Estevao (Brazil)

=== Final ===
15 December 2019
20:00

Argentina	5–3	Brazil
Cipolletta ?'; Blumberg ?'; Pomar ?'; Ponzetti ?'; A. González ?'	Report	?', ?' Carlinhos; ?' Thiago Dias

Los Pynandi World Cup Stadium, Luque
Referee: José Cortez (Ecuador)

== Awards ==
Immediately following the conclusion of the final, the following awards were presented.

=== Winners trophy ===
Sudamericano Sub-20 Futbol Playa 2019
champions

Argentina
First title

=== Individual awards ===
Top scorer
(Paraguay) Carlos Benítez
13 goals
Best player
(Argentina) Lucas Ponzetti
Best goalkeeper
(Argentina) Fede Devoto
Fair play award
Bolivia

== Final standings ==
Rank	Team	Result
1	Argentina	Champions
2	Brazil	Runners-up
3	Paraguay	Third place
4	Peru	
5	Ecuador	
6	Colombia	
7	Chile	
8	Bolivia	
9	Uruguay	
