= South American Under-20 Beach Soccer Championship =

- Organizer(s): CONMEBOL
- Founded: 2017; 9 years ago
- Region: South America (CONMEBOL)
- Teams: 10
- Current champion: Paraguay (2nd title)
- Most championships: Paraguay (2 titles)
- 2025 South American Under-20 Beach Soccer Championship

The CONMEBOL South American Under-20 Beach Soccer Championship (named natively in Spanish as the CONMEBOL Sub-20 Fútbol Playa) is a biennial international youth beach soccer tournament contested between the national teams of men aged under 20 years of the 10 members of CONMEBOL. It is the under-20s version of the Copa América de Beach Soccer and beach soccer's version of the better known South American Youth Football Championship in its parent sport, association football.

The tournament is organized by the governing body for football in South America, CONMEBOL, who commissioned the event in 2015 as part of a declaration of commitment to develop beach soccer on the continent which involved establishing new tournaments, including an under-20s championship. The first edition subsequently took place in 2017.

Paraguay are the current champions.

== Results ==
Year	Location	Final			Third Place Play-off		
Year	Location	Winners	Score	Runners-up	Third Place	Score	Fourth Place
2017 details	Montevideo, Uruguay	Brazil	1–1 (a.e.t.) (1–0 pen.)	Argentina	Paraguay	8–1	Colombia
2019 details	Luque, Paraguay	Argentina	5–3	Brazil	Paraguay	5–4	Peru
2021	No tournament due to the COVID-19 pandemic.						
2023 details	Iquique, Chile	Paraguay	5–3	Brazil	Chile	4–4 (a.e.t.) (4–2 pen.)	Colombia
2026 details	Lima, Peru	Paraguay	5–0	Brazil	Venezuela	4–3	Colombia

== Performance ==
=== Successful nations ===
Team	Titles	Runners-up	Third Place	Fourth Place
Paraguay	2 (2023, 2026)	–	2 (2017, 2019)	–
Brazil	1 (2017)	3 (2019, 2023, 2026)	–	–
Argentina	1 (2019)	1 (2017)	–	–
Chile	–	–	1 (2023)	–
Venezuela	–	–	1 (2026)	–
Colombia	–	–	–	3 (2017, 2023, 2026)
Peru	–	–	–	1 (2019)

=== Overall standings ===
Pos	Team	App	Pld	W	W+	WP	L	GF	GA	GD	Pts	Avg. Pts
1	Brazil	3	18	13	1	1	3	106	50	+56	42	2.33
2	Paraguay	3	17	13	0	0	4	106	57	+49	39	2.29
3	Argentina	3	17	12	0	0	5	67	58	+9	36	2.12
4	Peru	3	15	6	0	0	9	55	68	–13	18	1.2
5	Chile	3	16	5	0	2	9	47	59	–12	17	1.06
6	Colombia	3	16	5	1	0	10	53	74	–21	17	1.06
7	Ecuador	3	15	5	0	0	10	58	63	-5	15	1
8	Venezuela	2	10	4	0	0	6	38	48	–10	12	1.2
9	Uruguay	3	14	3	1	1	9	46	79	–33	12	0.86
10	Bolivia	3	14	3	0	0	11	44	68	–24	9	0.64

Updated on 13 August 2023.
Key: Appearances App / Won in Normal Time W = 3 Points / Won in Extra Time W+ = 2 Points / Won in Penalty shoot-out WP = 1 Point / Lost L = 0 Points

=== Appearances & performance timeline ===
Key

- 1st – Champions
- 2nd – Runners-up
- 3rd – Third place
- 4th – Fourth place
- 5th–10th — Fifth to tenth place
- × — Did not participate
- – Hosts
- Apps — Total appearances

Teams \ Years	2017 (Uruguay) (10)	2019 (Paraguay) (9)	2023 (Chile) (10)	2026 (Peru) (10)	Apps
Argentina	2nd	1st	10th	9th	4
Bolivia	7th	8th	9th	6th	4
Brazil	1st	2nd	2nd	2nd	4
Chile	10th	7th	3rd	5th	4
Colombia	4th	6th	4th	4th	4
Ecuador	9th	5th	8th	7th	4
Paraguay	3rd	3rd	1st	1st	4
Peru	8th	4th	5th	8th	4
Uruguay	5th	9th	6th	10th	4
Venezuela	6th	×	7th	3rd	3

== See also ==
- South American Under-20 Futsal Championship
