= Copa Libertadores de Fútbol Playa =

- Organizer(s): CONMEBOL
- Founded: 2016; 10 years ago
- Region: South America
- Teams: 12
- Current champion: (Brazil) Vasco da Gama (5th title)
- Most championships: (Brazil) Vasco da Gama (5 titles)
- Website: CONMEBOL.com
- 2025 Copa Libertadores de Fútbol Playa

The CONMEBOL Libertadores Fútbol Playa is an annual continental beach soccer club competition, organized by the governing body for football in South America, CONMEBOL, founded in 2016.

Since 2017, the tournament is contested between the top-level domestic league/championship champions from each of the ten South American nations which are members of CONMEBOL. The reigning champions and an additional club from the host country also take part, taking the total number of participants to twelve. It is therefore the premier club beach soccer championship in South America, the winners becoming continental champions.

It is beach soccer's version of the better known Copa Libertadores in association football. Comparatively, in beach soccer, it is South America's version of Europe's Euro Winners Cup.

== Results ==
Year	Location	No. of clubs	Final			Third place match		
Year	Location	No. of clubs	Champion	Result	Runners-up	Third place	Result	Fourth place
2016^{[A]}	Santos, Brazil	9	Vasco da Gama (Brazil)	8–1	(Argentina) Rosario Central	Deportes Iquique (Chile)	4–1	(Peru) Punta Hermosa
2017	Lambare, Paraguay	12	Vasco da Gama (Brazil)	8–5	(Uruguay) Malvin	Universidad Autonoma (Paraguay)	9–7	(Paraguay) Garden Club
2018	Rio de Janeiro, Brazil	12	Vitória (Brazil)	8–8 (a.e.t.)^{[B]}	(Brazil) Vasco da Gama	Sampaio Corrêa (Brazil)	5–4	(Argentina) Acassuso
2019	Luque, Paraguay	12	Vasco da Gama (Brazil)	7–5	(Paraguay) Cerro Porteño	Acassuso (Argentina)	7–6	(Venezuela) Fundación Monagas
2020	Rosario, Argentina	Cancelled due to the COVID-19 pandemic.						
2021	Rosario, Argentina	Cancelled due to the COVID-19 pandemic.						
2022^{[C]}	Iquique, Chile	12	Presidente Hayes (Paraguay)	6–5 (a.e.t.)	(Brazil) Sampaio Corrêa	Acassuso (Argentina)	4–3	(Chile) Alto Hospicio
2023	Luque, Paraguay	12	San Antonio (Paraguay)	3–1	(Paraguay) Presidente Hayes	Libertad (Paraguay)	8–5	(Peru) Unión Lurín
2024	Luque, Paraguay	12	Vasco da Gama (Brazil)	5–2	(Paraguay) Sportivo Luqueño	(Venezuela) Centauros	4–3	(Paraguay) 24 de Setiembre
2025	Vila Velha, Brazil	12	Vasco da Gama (Brazil)	8–2	(Brazil) Sampaio Corrêa	Sportivo Luqueño (Paraguay)	9–4	(Chile) Dávila FC

A. The 2016 edition took place in January 2017; CONMEBOL jointly organized the inaugural edition with Beach Soccer Worldwide (BSWW).
B. Vitória won the penalty shootout 3–2.
C. The 2022 edition took place in June 2023.

== Performance ==
=== By club ===
Team	Winners	Runners-up	Third place
(Brazil) Vasco da Gama	5 (2016, 2017, 2019, 2024, 2025)	1 (2018)	–
(Paraguay) Presidente Hayes	1 (2022)	1 (2023)	–
(Brazil) Vitória	1 (2018)	–	–
(Paraguay) San Antonio	1 (2023)	–	–
(Brazil) Sampaio Corrêa	–	2 (2022, 2025)	1 (2018)
(Argentina) Rosario Central	–	1 (2016)	–
(Uruguay) Malvin	–	1 (2017)	–
(Paraguay) Cerro Porteño	–	1 (2019)	–
(Paraguay) Sportivo Luqueño	–	1 (2024)	1 (2025)
(Argentina) Acassuso	–	–	2 (2019, 2022)
(Chile) Deportes Iquique	–	–	1 (2016)
(Paraguay) Universidad Autonoma	–	–	1 (2017)
(Paraguay) Libertad	–	–	1 (2023)

=== By nation ===
Nation	Winners	Runners-up	Third place
Brazil	6	3	1
Paraguay	2	3	3
Argentina	0	1	2
Uruguay	0	1	0
Chile	0	0	1
Venezuela	0	0	1

== See also ==
- Mundialito de Clubes
