= 2018 Copa Libertadores de Beach Soccer =

Tournament details
- Host country: Brazil
- Dates: 26 November – 2 December
- Teams: 12 (from 1 confederation)
- Venue: 1 (in 1 host city)

Final positions
- Champions: (Brazil) Vitória (1st title)
- Runners-up: (Brazil) Vasco da Gama
- Third place: (Brazil) Sampaio Corrêa
- Fourth place: (Argentina) Acassuso

Tournament statistics
- Matches played: 26
- Goals scored: 274 (10.54 per match)

The 2018 CONMEBOL Libertadores de Beach Soccer was the third edition of the Copa Libertadores de Beach Soccer (known natively in Spanish as the Copa Libertadores de Futbol Playa), an annual continental beach soccer club tournament contested primarily between the champions of the domestic leagues of South American nations who are members of CONMEBOL. A total of 12 clubs took part.

Announced on 31 May, the tournament took place between 26 November and 2 December in Rio de Janeiro, Brazil. It was organised by CONMEBOL in cooperation will local entities: the Brazilian Football Confederation (CBF) and Brazil Beach Soccer Confederation (CBSB) The event was originally due to take place in Belém, Pará State, Brazil but a change of venue was announced on 23 October.

Brazilians Vasco da Gama were the defending champions but finished as runners-up to fellow Brazilian club Vitória who claimed their first title.

== Format ==
As per Regulations Article 15, the tournament starts with a group stage, played in a round robin format. The winners, runners-up and two best third placed teams from each group advance to the knockout stage, in which the teams then compete in single-elimination matches, beginning with the quarter-finals and ending with the final. A third-place deciding match is also contested by the losing semi-finalists.

Unlike the two previous editions, there are no consolation matches to decide 5th to 12th place; these placements are instead decided statistically (Regulations Articles 22 & 23).

== Teams ==
Twelve teams qualified; each domestic league champion from the ten South American nations which are members of CONMEBOL, plus an additional club from the host country and the defending champions.

Association	Representatives
Argentina	Acassuso
Bolivia	Hamacas
(Brazil) Brazil^{1}	Vasco da Gama
(Brazil) Brazil^{1}	Sampaio Corrêa
(Brazil) Brazil^{1}	Vitória
Chile	Code Iquique

Association	Representatives
Colombia	La 25 Export
Ecuador	Delfin Sporting
Paraguay	Náutico Puerta del Lago
Peru	Academia Tito Drago
Uruguay	Bella Vista
Venezuela	Monagas Dífalo

1. Brazil entered three clubs: a. Vasco da Gama qualify as reigning champions, b. the Brazilian league champions, Sampaio Corrêa, c. the host country is also awarded an additional berth which went to the league runners-up, Vitória.

== Venue ==
Barra Olympic Park; the Olympic Tennis Centre is shown bottom right.	Location of Rio de Janeiro in Brazil

One venue was used in the city of Rio de Janeiro.

- All matches took place at a purpose built arena at Barra Olympic Park, just outside the Olympic Tennis Centre.

== Squads ==
Each team had to submit a squad of 12 players, including a minimum of two goalkeepers (Regulations Article 33).

== Draw ==
The draw to split the twelve teams into three groups of four took place on 19 November at 19:00 local time in Rio de Janeiro, Brazil at the headquarters of the Brazilian Football Confederation. The draw was conducted based on Regulations Article 16 as follows:

Initially, three teams were seeded and assigned to the head of the groups (Vasco da Gama automatically, the others via a draw):

- to Group A: 2017 Copa Libertadores champions, (Brazil) Vasco da Gama
- to Group B: champions of the host association, (Brazil) Sampaio Corrêa
- to Group C: club of the runner-up national association of the 2017 Copa Libertadores, (Uruguay) Bella Vista

The remaining nine teams were split into three pots of three based on the final placement of their national association's club in the previous edition of the championship, with the highest seeds placed in Pot 1 down to the lowest placed in Pot 3 (the additional Brazilian team was also placed in Pot 3). From each pot, the first team drawn was placed into Group A, the second team drawn placed into Group B and the final team drawn placed into Group C. Teams from the same association could not be drawn into the same group.

Pot 1	Pot 2	Pot 3
(Paraguay) Náutico Puerta del Lago; (Venezuela) Monagas Dífalo; (Bolivia) Hamacas	(Argentina) Acassuso; (Ecuador) Delfin Sporting; (Chile) Code Iquique	(Brazil) Vitória; (Peru) Academia Tito Drago; (Colombia) La 25 Export

== Group stage ==
The match schedule was revealed on the day of the draw.

Each team earns three points for a win in regulation time, two points for a win in extra time, one point for a win in a penalty shoot-out, and no points for a defeat. The top two teams of each group, plus the two best ranked third-placed teams, advance to the quarter-finals. The rankings of teams in each group are determined as follows (Regulations Article 21):

1. points obtained in all group matches;

If two or more teams are equal on the basis of the above criterion, their rankings are determined as follows:

2. points obtained in the group matches between the teams concerned;
3. goal difference in the group matches between the teams concerned;
4. number of goals scored in the group matches between the teams concerned;
5. goal difference in all group matches;
6. number of goals scored in all group matches;
7. drawing of lots by CONMEBOL.

All times are local, BRST (UTC–2)

=== Group A ===
Pos	Team	Pld	W	W+	WP	L	GF	GA	GD	Pts	Qualification
1	(Brazil) Vasco da Gama	3	3	0	0	0	26	12	+14	9	Knockout stage
2	(Colombia) La 25 Export	3	2	0	0	1	14	18	−4	6	Knockout stage
3	(Paraguay) Náutico Puerta del Lago	3	1	0	0	2	21	20	+1	3	Knockout stage
4	(Ecuador) Delfin Sporting	3	0	0	0	3	13	24	−11	0	

Source: CONMEBOL

26 November 2018	Vasco da Gama (Brazil)	10–7	(Paraguay) Náutico Puerta del Lago
15:45		Report

26 November 2018	Delfin Sporting (Ecuador)	5–7	(Colombia) La 25 Export
17:00		Report

27 November 2018	Vasco da Gama (Brazil)	7–3	(Ecuador) Delfin Sporting
15:45		Report

27 November 2018	Náutico Puerta del Lago (Paraguay)	4–5	(Colombia) La 25 Export
17:00		Report

28 November 2018	La 25 Export (Colombia)	2–9	(Brazil) Vasco da Gama
11:15		Report

28 November 2018	Náutico Puerta del Lago (Paraguay)	10–5	(Ecuador) Delfin Sporting
14:30		Report

=== Group B ===
Pos	Team	Pld	W	W+	WP	L	GF	GA	GD	Pts	Qualification
1	(Brazil) Sampaio Corrêa	3	3	0	0	0	31	6	+25	9	Knockout stage
2	(Bolivia) Hamacas	3	1	0	0	2	11	15	−4	3	Knockout stage
3	(Peru) Academia Tito Drago	3	1	0	0	2	11	18	−7	3	
4	(Chile) Code Iquique	3	1	0	0	2	11	25	−14	3	

Source: CONMEBOL

26 November 2018	Sampaio Corrêa (Brazil)	7–0	(Bolivia) Hamacas
11:15		Report

26 November 2018	Code Iquique (Chile)	5–3	(Peru) Academia Tito Drago
14:30		Report

27 November 2018	Sampaio Corrêa (Brazil)	14–2	(Chile) Code Iquique
11:15		Report

27 November 2018	Hamacas (Bolivia)	3–4	(Peru) Academia Tito Drago
14:30		Report

28 November 2018	Academia Tito Drago (Peru)	4–10	(Brazil) Sampaio Corrêa
08:30		Report

28 November 2018	Hamacas (Bolivia)	8–4	(Chile) Code Iquique
09:45		Report

=== Group C ===
Pos	Team	Pld	W	W+	WP	L	GF	GA	GD	Pts	Qualification
1	(Brazil) Vitória	3	2	0	1	0	16	9	+7	7	Knockout stage
2	(Argentina) Acassuso	3	1	0	0	2	11	14	−3	3	Knockout stage
3	(Uruguay) Bella Vista	3	1	0	0	2	15	16	−1	3	Knockout stage
4	(Venezuela) Monagas Dífalo	3	0	0	1	2	16	19	−3	1	

Source: CONMEBOL

26 November 2018	Bella Vista (Uruguay)	9–7	(Venezuela) Monagas Dífalo
08:30		Report

26 November 2018	Acassuso (Argentina)	1–7	(Brazil) Vitória
09:45		Report

27 November 2018	Bella Vista (Uruguay)	1–4	(Argentina) Acassuso
08:30		Report

27 November 2018	Monagas Dífalo (Venezuela)	3–4	(Brazil) Vitória
09:45		Report

28 November 2018	Vitória (Brazil)	5–5 (a.e.t.) (3–2 p)	(Uruguay) Bella Vista
15:45		Report

28 November 2018	Monagas Dífalo (Venezuela)	6–6 (a.e.t.) (3–1 p)	(Argentina) Acassuso
17:00		Report

=== Ranking of third-placed teams ===
Pos	Grp	Team	Pld	W	W+	WP	L	GF	GA	GD	Pts	Qualification
1	A	(Paraguay) Náutico Puerta del Lago	3	1	0	0	2	21	20	+1	3	Knockout stage
2	C	(Uruguay) Bella Vista	3	1	0	0	2	15	16	−1	3	Knockout stage
3	B	(Peru) Tito Drago	3	1	0	0	2	11	18	−7	3	

As per Regulations Article 17, it was decided the third place teams would take the following berths in the quarter-final draw:

- 1st Group A vs 2nd best third place team
- 1st Group B vs Best third place team
- 1st Group C vs 2nd Group A
- 2nd Group B vs 2nd Group C

== Knockout stage ==
The group winners, runners-up and two best third placed teams progressed to the knockout stage to continue to compete for the title.

Quarter-finals
30 November
(Brazil) Vasco da Gama	6
(Uruguay) Bella Vista	4
30 November
(Bolivia) Hamacas	2
(Argentina) Acassuso	5
30 November
(Brazil) Sampaio Corrêa	7
(Paraguay) Náutico Puerta del Lago	2
30 November
(Brazil) Vitória	6
(Colombia) La 25 Export	0

Semi-finals
1 December
(Brazil) Vasco da Gama	5
(Argentina) Acassuso	4
1 December
(Brazil) Sampaio Corrêa	6 (2)
(Brazil) Vitória (p)	6 (3)

Final
2 December
(Brazil) Vasco da Gama	8 (2)
(Brazil) Vitória (p)	8 (3)
Third place
2 December
(Argentina) Acassuso	4
(Brazil) Sampaio Corrêa	5

=== Quarter-finals ===
30 November 2018
09:45

Hamacas (Bolivia)	2–5	(Argentina) Acassuso
	Report

30 November 2018
11:15

Sampaio Corrêa (Brazil)	7–2	(Paraguay) Náutico Puerta del Lago
	Report

30 November 2018
15:45

Vitória (Brazil)	6–0	(Colombia) La 25 Export
	Report

30 November 2018
17:00

Vasco da Gama (Brazil)	6–4	(Uruguay) Bella Vista
	Report

=== Semi-finals ===
1 December 2018
10:30

Sampaio Corrêa (Brazil)	6–6 (a.e.t.)	(Brazil) Vitória
	Report
Penalties
	2–3

1 December 2018
11:45

Vasco da Gama (Brazil)	5–4	(Argentina) Acassuso
	Report

=== Third place play-off ===
2 December 2018
09:45

Acassuso (Argentina)	4–5	(Brazil) Sampaio Corrêa
Bordon; Tarabini	Report	Eudin; Rodrigo; Felipe

=== Final ===
2 December 2018
11:00

Vasco da Gama (Brazil)	8–8 (a.e.t.)	(Brazil) Vitória
Jordan; Antônio; Mauricinho; Benjinha	Report	Nelito; Reyder; Thiago; (o.g.) Mauricinho
Penalties
Antonio (penalty scored); Rafinha (penalty scored); Bokinha (penalty missed)	2–3	(penalty scored) Anderson; (penalty scored) Sidney; (penalty scored) Nelito

== Final standings ==
Rank	Team	Result
1	(Brazil) Vitória	Champions (1st title)
2	(Brazil) Vasco da Gama	Runners-up
3	(Brazil) Sampaio Corrêa	Third place
4	(Argentina) Acassuso	
5	(Uruguay) Bella Vista	^{[Note1]}
6	(Bolivia) Hamacas	^{[Note1]}
7	(Paraguay) Náutico Puerta del Lago	^{[Note1]}
8	(Colombia) La 25 Export	^{[Note1]}
9	(Peru) Tito Drago	^{[Note2]}
10	(Chile) Code Iquique	^{[Note2]}
11	(Venezuela) Monagas Dífalo	^{[Note2]}
12	(Ecuador) Delfin Sporting	^{[Note2]}

Note1 Regulations Article 22 outlines the criteria for defining the teams that finish in 5th–8th place
Note2 Regulations Article 23 outlines the criteria for defining the teams that finish in 9th–12th place
