= 2017 South American Under-20 Beach Soccer Championship =

Sudamericano Sub-20 Futbol Playa Uruguay 2017

Tournament details
- Host country: Uruguay
- Dates: 3–10 December
- Teams: 10 (from 1 confederation)
- Venue(s): 1 (in 1 host city)

Final positions
- Champions: Brazil (1st title)
- Runners-up: Argentina
- Third place: Paraguay
- Fourth place: Colombia

Tournament statistics
- Matches played: 27
- Goals scored: 230 (8.52 per match)
- Top scorer(s): (Paraguay) Carlos Benítez (20 goals)
- Best player(s): (Argentina) Axel Rutterschmidt
- Best goalkeeper: (Argentina) Nicolás Santillan

The 2017 CONMEBOL South American Under-20 Beach Soccer Championship was the first edition of the South American Under-20 Beach Soccer Championship (known natively in Spanish as the Sudamericano Sub-20 Futbol Playa), an international youth beach soccer tournament for South American national teams of men under the age of 20.

The championship was organised by CONMEBOL, the governing body for football in South America, in cooperation with the local organisers, the Uruguayan Football Federation (AUF). Confirmed in December 2015, the event took place between 3 and 10 December in Montevideo, Uruguay.

Brazil won the inaugural championship, beating Argentina on penalties in the final to become under-20 South American champions.

== Teams ==
Under 20s teams representing all 10 members of CONMEBOL took part.

- Argentina
- Bolivia
- Brazil
- Chile
- Colombia
- Ecuador
- Paraguay
- Peru
- Venezuela
- Uruguay

== Squads ==
Each team submitted a squad consisting of 12 players, of individuals no older than 20 years.

== Venue ==
One venue was used to host all matches in the capital city of Montevideo, on Pocitos Beach, in the district of Pocitos.

Montevideo	2017 South American Under-20 Beach Soccer Championship (Uruguay)
Estadio Arenas del Plata	2017 South American Under-20 Beach Soccer Championship (Uruguay)
34°54′30″S 56°9′0″W	2017 South American Under-20 Beach Soccer Championship (Uruguay)
Capacity: 2,500^{,} ^{[Note]}	2017 South American Under-20 Beach Soccer Championship (Uruguay)
(as seen in 2012)	2017 South American Under-20 Beach Soccer Championship (Uruguay)

Note Correct as of 2011.

== Draw ==
The draw to split the ten teams into two groups of five took place on November 1 at 19:00 UYT (UTC−3) in Montevideo, Uruguay at the headquarters of the Uruguayan Football Association.

Initially, two teams were automatically assigned to the groups:

- to Group A: as the host association, Uruguay
- to Group B: the highest ranked team in the last U-20 tournament, Brazil

The remaining eight teams were split into four pots of two, shown in the below table.

The teams were seeded based on how many points they gained in the last U-20 tournament, the Liga Sudamericana; those with the most points were placed in Pot 1 as the highest seeds, down to the lowest seeds in Pot 4 who collected the fewest points. From each pot, one team was drawn into Group A and the other team was drawn into Group B.

Pot 1	Pot 2	Pot 3	Pot 4
Argentina; Paraguay	Chile; Ecuador	Venezuela; Bolivia	Peru; Colombia

== Group stage ==
The match schedule was revealed on 1 November, after the completion of the draw.

All times are local, UYT (UTC−3).

=== Group A ===
Pos	Team	Pld	W	W+	WP	L	GF	GA	GD	Pts	Qualification
1	Argentina	4	4	0	0	0	22	11	+11	12	Knockout stage
2	Colombia	4	2	0	0	2	16	16	0	6	Knockout stage
3	Uruguay (H)	4	1	0	1	2	14	16	−2	4	Placement matches
4	Bolivia	4	1	0	0	3	12	17	−5	3 (Note: Ranked based on head-to-head result (BOL 5–4 CHI))	Placement matches
5	Chile	4	1	0	0	3	18	22	−4	3	Placement matches

Source: BSWW
(H) Host
Notes:

3 December 2017	Argentina	6–1	Bolivia	Estadio Arenas del Plata, Montevideo
15:45		Report(es)

3 December 2017	Colombia	2–5	Uruguay	Estadio Arenas del Plata, Montevideo
18:15		Report(es)

4 December 2017	Chile	3–6	Colombia	Estadio Arenas del Plata, Montevideo
15:45		Report(es)

4 December 2017	Uruguay	3–3 (a.e.t.) (3–2 p)	Bolivia	Estadio Arenas del Plata, Montevideo
18:15		Report(es)

5 December 2017	Bolivia	3–4	Colombia	Estadio Arenas del Plata, Montevideo
15:45		Report(es)

5 December 2017	Argentina	7–4	Chile	Estadio Arenas del Plata, Montevideo
18:15		Report(es)

6 December 2017	Argentina	5–4	Colombia	Estadio Arenas del Plata, Montevideo
15:45		Report(es)

6 December 2017	Uruguay	4–7	Chile	Estadio Arenas del Plata, Montevideo
18:15		Report(es)

7 December 2017	Chile	4–5	Bolivia	Estadio Arenas del Plata, Montevideo
15:45		Report(es)

7 December 2017	Uruguay	2–4	Argentina	Estadio Arenas del Plata, Montevideo
18:15		Report(es)

=== Group B ===
Pos	Team	Pld	W	W+	WP	L	GF	GA	GD	Pts	Qualification
1	Brazil	4	3	1	0	0	26	11	+15	11	Knockout stage
2	Paraguay	4	3	0	0	1	25	18	+7	9	Knockout stage
3	Venezuela	4	2	0	0	2	18	26	−8	6	Placement matches
4	Peru	4	1	0	0	3	13	19	−6	3	Placement matches
5	Ecuador	4	0	0	0	4	12	20	−8	0	Placement matches

Source: BSWW

3 December 2017	Paraguay	7–4	Venezuela	Estadio Arenas del Plata, Montevideo
14:30		Report(es)

3 December 2017	Peru	0–4	Brazil	Estadio Arenas del Plata, Montevideo
17:00		Report(es)

4 December 2017	Ecuador	3–5	Peru	Estadio Arenas del Plata, Montevideo
14:30		Report(es)

4 December 2017	Brazil	12–4	Venezuela	Estadio Arenas del Plata, Montevideo
17:00		Report(es)

5 December 2017	Venezuela	5–3	Peru	Estadio Arenas del Plata, Montevideo
14:30		Report(es)

5 December 2017	Paraguay	6–3	Ecuador	Estadio Arenas del Plata, Montevideo
17:00		Report(es)

6 December 2017	Paraguay	7–5	Peru	Estadio Arenas del Plata, Montevideo
14:30		Report(es)

6 December 2017	Brazil	4–2	Ecuador	Estadio Arenas del Plata, Montevideo
17:00		Report(es)

7 December 2017	Ecuador	4–5	Venezuela	Estadio Arenas del Plata, Montevideo
14:30		Report(es)

7 December 2017	Brazil	6–5 (a.e.t.)	Paraguay	Estadio Arenas del Plata, Montevideo
17:00		Report(es)

== Placement matches ==
The teams finishing in third, fourth and fifth place in the groups were knocked out of title-winning contention, receding to play in consolation matches to determine 5th through 10th place in the final standings.

=== Ninth place play-off ===
8 December 2017
15:45

Chile	4–6	Ecuador
	Report(es)

Estadio Arenas del Plata, Montevideo

=== Seventh place play-off ===
8 December 2017
17:00

Bolivia	6–2	Peru
	Report(es)

Estadio Arenas del Plata, Montevideo

=== Fifth place play-off ===
8 December 2017
18:15

Uruguay	3–2 (a.e.t.)	Venezuela
	Report(es)

Estadio Arenas del Plata, Montevideo

== Knockout stage ==
The group winners and runners-up progressed to the knockout stage to continue to compete for the title.

Semi-finals
9 December
Brazil	10
Colombia	3
9 December
Argentina	5
Paraguay	2

Final
10 December
Brazil (p)	1 (1)
Argentina	1 (0)
Third place play-off
10 December
Colombia	1
Paraguay	8

=== Semi-finals ===
9 December 2017
15:45

Brazil	10–3	Colombia
Lucas Xavier; Josep Júnior; Sávio; Paulinho; Willamy; Digão	Report (es)	Ruiz; López; Donado

Estadio Arenas del Plata, Montevideo

9 December 2017
17:00

Argentina	5–2	Paraguay
Noriega; Ponzetti; Maciel	Report (es)	C. Benítez

Estadio Arenas del Plata, Montevideo

=== Third place play-off ===
10 December 2017
15:45

Colombia	1–8	Paraguay
Lopez	Report(es)	C. Benítez; J. Benítez; Cantero; Areco; P. Benítez

Estadio Arenas del Plata, Montevideo
Referee: Mariano Romo (Argentina)

=== Final ===
10 December 2017
17:00

Brazil	1–1 (a.e.t.)	Argentina
Lucas Xavier	Report(es)	Ponzetti
Penalties
Raphael Silva (penalty missed); Lucas Xavier (penalty missed); Willamy (penalty scored)	1–0	(penalty missed) Rutterschmidt; (penalty missed) Martínez; (penalty missed) Noriega

Estadio Arenas del Plata, Montevideo
Referee: Gustavo Dominguez (Paraguay)

== Awards ==
=== Winners trophy ===
Sudamericano Sub-20 Futbol Playa 2017
champions

Brazil
First title

=== Individual awards ===
Top scorer
(Paraguay) Carlos Benítez
20 goals
Best player
(Argentina) Axel Rutterschmidt
Best goalkeeper
(Argentina) Nicolás Santillan
Fair play award
Paraguay

== Top goalscorers ==
Players with 5 or more goals

20 goals

- (Paraguay) Carlos Benítez

12 goals

- (Argentina) Lucas Ponzetti

8 goals

- (Chile) Daniel Duran
- (Colombia) Juan Esteban Castrillon
- (Bolivia) Luis Enrique Molina
- (Brazil) Raphael Silva

6 goals

- (Brazil) Savio
- (Uruguay) Facundo Cordero

5 goals

- (Chile) Ivan Marcelo Araya
- (Peru) Oscar Alarcon
- (Peru) Christian Diaz
- (Ecuador) Michael Loor

== Final standings ==
Rank	Team	Result
1	Brazil	Champions
2	Argentina	Runners-up
3	Paraguay	Third place
4	Colombia	
5	Uruguay	
6	Venezuela	
7	Bolivia	
8	Peru	
9	Ecuador	
10	Chile	
