= 2019 Copa Libertadores de Beach Soccer =

Tournament details
- Host country: Paraguay
- City: Luque
- Dates: 14 – 21 September
- Teams: 12 (from 1 confederation)
- Venue: 1 (in 1 host city)

Final positions
- Champions: (Brazil) Vasco da Gama (3rd title)
- Runners-up: (Paraguay) Cerro Porteño
- Third place: (Argentina) Acassuso
- Fourth place: (Venezuela) Fundación Monagas

Tournament statistics
- Matches played: 31
- Goals scored: 262 (8.45 per match)
- Top scorer(s): (Paraguay) Sergio Díaz (San Bernardino; 17 goals)

The 2019 CONMEBOL Libertadores de Beach Soccer was the fourth edition of the Copa Libertadores de Beach Soccer (known natively in Spanish as the Copa Libertadores de Futbol Playa), an annual continental beach soccer club tournament contested primarily between the champions of the domestic leagues of South American nations who are members of CONMEBOL.

The tournament took place in Luque, Paraguay, between 14 and 21 September 2019, and was organised by CONMEBOL in cooperation with the host association, the Paraguayan Football Association (APF). It was originally scheduled to take place from 13–20 October 2019 but a change of dates was announced on 13 June.

Brazilians Vitória were the defending champions but were eliminated at the group stage, ultimately finishing 10th. The title was won by fellow Brazilian club Vasco da Gama, who claimed their third title at the fourth attempt.

== Format ==
As per Regulations Article 15, the competition format consists of two phases: the Preliminary phase (Group phase) and the Final phase.

1. Group phase: The 12 teams are drawn into three groups of four teams; in each group all teams compete in a round robin format. The group winners, runners-up and two best third placed teams advance to the quarter-finals of the final stage.
2. Final phase: The Final phase consists of three knockout rounds (the quarter-finals, semi-finals and final) and consolations rounds (the nations knocked out of title winning contention play in a series of classification matches to decide fifth through twelfth place). All matches in the final stage are played in a knockout format.

== Teams ==
Twelve teams qualified to take part; each of the domestic league champions (or champions of specific Copa Libertadores qualification tournaments) from the ten South American nations which are members of CONMEBOL, plus an additional club from the host country and the defending champions.

Association	Representatives	Qualification method
Argentina	Acassuso	2019 Liga Nacional de Fútbol Playa champions.
Bolivia	Hamacas	2019 Torneo Nacional de Fútbol Playa champions.
Brazil	Vitória (Brazil 1)	2018 Copa Libertadores de Beach Soccer champions.
Brazil	Vasco da Gama (Brazil 2)	2019 Campeonato Brasileiro de Beach Soccer champions.
Chile	CODE Iquique	
Colombia	Guaviare	2019 Pre-Libertadores de Fútbol Playa champions.
Ecuador	Fluminense Blasa	2019 Liga Nacional de Fútbol Playa Torneo Apertura champions.
Paraguay	San Bernardino (Paraguay 1)	2019 Superlga de Fútbol Playa champions.
Paraguay	Cerro Porteño (Paraguay 2)	2019 Copa Paraguay de Fútbol Playa champions.
Peru	Academia Tito Drago	2019 Liga de Fútbol Playa Primera División champions.
Uruguay	Racing Club	2019 Liga Uruguaya de Fútbol Playa Pre-Libertadores champions.
Venezuela	Fundación Monagas	2019 Liga Nacional de Fútbol Playa champions.

Notes

1. ^{†} As the national association defending champions, Brazil entered two teams. Vitória qualify as reigning champions and Vasco da Gama qualify as the Brazilian league champions.
2. ^{‡} As the host country, Paraguay received an extra berth and entered two teams. San Bernardino qualify as the Paraguayan Superliga champions and Cerro Porteño qualify as the Copa Paraguay champions.

== Venue ==
Location of Luque in Paraguay

One venue was used in the city of Luque, Gran Asunción.

- All matches took place at the Estadio de Fútbol de Playa, newly built to primarily host the 2019 FIFA Beach Soccer World Cup, located on the grounds of the Paraguayan Olympic Committee with a capacity of 3,150.

== Squads ==
Each team had to submit a squad of 12 players, including a minimum of two goalkeepers (Regulations Article 31).

== Draw ==
The draw to split the twelve teams into three groups of four took place on 20 August 2019 at 12:00 PYT (UTC–3) in Luque, Paraguay at the headquarters of the Paraguayan Football Association. The draw was conducted based on Regulations Article 16 as follows:

Initially, three teams were seeded and assigned to the head of the groups (Vitória automatically to Group A, the others via a draw from pot 1):

- To Group A: as 2018 Copa Libertadores champions, (Brazil) Vitória
- To Group B: as the club of the runner-up national association of the 2018 Copa Libertadores, (Brazil) Vasco da Gama
- To Group C: as champions of the host association, (Paraguay) San Bernardino

The remaining nine teams were split into three pots of three based on the final placement of their national association's club in the previous edition of the championship, with the highest three (Argentina, Uruguay and Bolivia) placed in Pot 2, the next three (Colombia, Peru and Chile) placed in Pot 3 and the lowest two (Venezuela and Ecuador) in pot 4, alongside the additional Paraguayan club. From each pot, the first team drawn was placed into Group A, the second team drawn placed into Group B and the final team drawn placed into Group C. Clubs from the same association could not be drawn into the same group.

Pot 1	Pot 2	Pot 3	Pot 4
(Paraguay) San Bernardino; (Brazil) Vasco da Gama	(Argentina) Acassuso; (Uruguay) Racing Club; (Bolivia) Hamacas	(Colombia) Guaviare; (Peru) Academia Tito Drago; (Chile) CODE Iquique	(Venezuela) Fundación Monagas; (Ecuador) Fluminense Blasa; (Paraguay) Cerro Porteño

The draw resulted in the following groups:

Group A
Pos	Team
A1	(Brazil) Vitória
A2	(Argentina) Acassuso
A3	(Colombia) Guaviare
A4	(Venezuela) Fundación Monagas

Group B
Pos	Team
B1	(Brazil) Vasco da Gama
B2	(Uruguay) Racing Club
B3	(Peru) Academia Tito Drago
B4	(Paraguay) Cerro Porteño

Group C
Pos	Team
C1	(Paraguay) San Bernardino
C2	(Bolivia) Hamacas
C3	(Chile) CODE Iquique
C4	(Ecuador) Fluminense Blasa

== Group stage ==
Each team earns three points for a win in regulation time, two points for a win in extra time, one point for a win in a penalty shoot-out, and no points for a defeat. The top two teams of each group, plus the two best ranked third-placed teams, advance to the quarter-finals.

Tie-breakers

If two or more teams are equal on points, their rankings are determined as follows (Regulations Article 21):

1. Goal difference in the matches played between the teams concerned;
2. Number of goals scored in the matches played between the teams concerned;
3. Goal difference in all group matches;
4. Number of goals scored in all group matches;
5. Drawing of lots by CONMEBOL.

All times are local, PYT (UTC–3).

=== Group A ===
Pos	Team	Pld	W	W+	WP	L	GF	GA	GD	Pts	Qualification
1	(Venezuela) Fundación Monagas	3	2	0	1	0	13	11	+2	7	Knockout stage
2	(Argentina) Acassuso	3	2	0	0	1	13	9	+4	6	Knockout stage
3	(Colombia) Guaviare	3	1	0	0	2	13	16	−3	3	Knockout stage
4	(Brazil) Vitória	3	0	0	0	3	10	13	−3	0	9th–12th place play-offs

Source: CONMEBOL
Rules for classification: Tie-breakers

14 September 2019	Vitória (Brazil)	2–3	(Argentina) Acassuso
13:00	Savio; André	Report	Rutterschmidt; Sosa; Benaducci	Referee: Gustavo Domínguez (Paraguay)

14 September 2019	Guaviare (Colombia)	4–5	(Venezuela) Fundación Monagas
14:30	Perea; Córdoba; Ortega; Bonilla	Report	Bacelar; Prado; García; Narea	Referee: Alex Valdiviezo (Peru)

15 September 2019	Acassuso (Argentina)	3–3 (a.e.t.) (3–4 p)	(Venezuela) Fundación Monagas
13:00	Medero	Report	Prado; Noriega	Referee: José Cortez (Ecuador)
	Penalties
	Medero (penalty scored); Benaducci (penalty scored); Ponzetti (penalty scored); Sirico (penalty missed)		(penalty scored) Bacelar; (penalty scored) Narea; (penalty scored) Ramos; (penalty scored) Prado

15 September 2019	Vitória (Brazil)	4–5	(Colombia) Guaviare
14:30	Batista; Rezende; Moura	Report	Hernández; Ortega; Perea	Referee: Christian Altez (Uruguay)

16 September 2019	Acassuso (Argentina)	7–4	(Colombia) Guaviare
13:00	Medero; Benaducci; Sirico	Report	Perea; Parra; Bonilla	Referee: Gustavo Domínguez (Paraguay)

16 September 2019	Fundación Monagas (Venezuela)	5–4	(Brazil) Vitória
14:30	Narea; R. Ramos; R. García; E. Ramos	Report	Savio; Batista	Referee: César Cabrera (Paraguay)

=== Group B ===
Pos	Team	Pld	W	W+	WP	L	GF	GA	GD	Pts	Qualification
1	(Brazil) Vasco da Gama	3	3	0	0	0	22	9	+13	9	Knockout stage
2	(Paraguay) Cerro Porteño	3	2	0	0	1	23	9	+14	6	Knockout stage
3	(Peru) Academia Tito Drago	3	1	0	0	2	7	20	−13	3	9th–12th place play-offs
4	(Uruguay) Racing Club	3	0	0	0	3	7	21	−14	0	9th–12th place play-offs

Source: CONMEBOL
Rules for classification: Tie-breakers

14 September 2019	Vasco da Gama (Brazil)	9–3	(Uruguay) Racing Club
16:00	De Farias; Da Silva; Souza; Soares; Farias; Franklin	Report	Pazos; Capurro; Miranda	Referee: Jesús Reyes (Venezuela)

14 September 2019	Academia Tito Drago (Peru)	1–11	(Paraguay) Cerro Porteño
17:30	Vidal	Report	Carballo; J. Rolón; Y. Rolón; C. Benítez; P. Benítez; Barreto	Referee: José Cortez (Ecuador)

15 September 2019	Vasco da Gama (Brazil)	6–2	(Peru) Academia Tito Drago
16:00	Souza; De Farias; Da Silva; Franklin; Soares	Report	Alcantara; C.Gómez	Referee: Jaimito Suarez (Bolivia)

15 September 2019	Racing Club (Uruguay)	1–8	(Paraguay) Cerro Porteño
17:30	Capurro	Report	C. Carballo; J. Rolón; G. Benítez; Ovelar; Barreto; Y. Rolón; J. Rodríguez	Referee: Darío Colombani (Argentina)

16 September 2019	Cerro Porteño (Paraguay)	4–7	(Brazil) Vasco da Gama
16:00	E. Barreto; C. Benítez; J. Rodríguez	Report	Soares; Souza; Franklin; Da Silva	Referee: Christian Altez (Ecuador)

16 September 2019	Racing Club (Uruguay)	3–4	(Peru) Academia Tito Drago
17:30	Quinta; Capurro	Report	C. Gómez; Vidal; Ibáñez	Referee: Ivo De Moraes (Brazil)

=== Group C ===
Pos	Team	Pld	W	W+	WP	L	GF	GA	GD	Pts	Qualification
1	(Chile) CODE Iquique	3	2	1	0	0	13	8	+5	8	Knockout stage
2	(Paraguay) San Bernardino	3	2	0	0	1	16	7	+9	6	Knockout stage
3	(Bolivia) Hamacas	3	1	0	0	2	6	7	−1	3	Knockout stage
4	(Ecuador) Fluminense Blasa	3	0	0	0	3	6	19	−13	0	9th–12th place play-offs

Source: CONMEBOL
Rules for classification: Tie-breakers

14 September 2019	San Bernardino (Paraguay)	2–0	(Bolivia) Hamacas
19:00	S. Díaz	Report		Referee: Ivo De Moraes (Brazil)

14 September 2019	CODE Iquique (Chile)	4–3	(Ecuador) Fluminense Blasa
20:30	S. Vega	Report	Moncada; Pinto	Referee: José Romo (Argentina)

15 September 2019	San Bernardino (Paraguay)	4–5 (a.e.t.)	(Chile) CODE Iquique
19:00	S. Díaz; Medina	Report	S. Vega; Oyarzun; Bolivar; Papic	Referee: Alex Valdiviezo (Peru)

15 September 2019	Hamacas (Bolivia)	5–1	(Ecuador) Fluminense Blasa
20:30	Barrios; Portales; Zambrano; Chávez	Report	Santana	Referee: Ramón Blanco (Peru)

16 September 2019	Fluminense Blasa (Ecuador)	2–10	(Paraguay) San Bernardino
19:00	Vera; Fajardo	Report	Fretes; Medina; S. Díaz; Agüero; R. Carballo	Referee: Renato De Carlos (Brazil)

16 September 2019	Hamacas (Bolivia)	1–4	(Chile) CODE Iquique
20:30	Sotelo	Report	Abarca; Papic; Peso	Referee: Aecio Fernández (Uruguay)

=== Ranking of third-placed teams ===
Pos	Grp	Team	Pld	W	W+	WP	L	GF	GA	GD	Pts	Qualification
1	C	(Bolivia) Hamacas	3	1	0	0	2	6	7	−1	3	Knockout stage
2	A	(Colombia) Guaviare	3	1	0	0	2	13	16	−3	3	Knockout stage
3	B	(Peru) Academia Tito Drago	3	1	0	0	2	7	20	−13	3	

Source: CONMEBOL

As per Regulations Article 17, it was decided the third place teams would take the following berths in the quarter-final draw:

- 1st Group A vs 2nd best third place team
- 1st Group B vs Best third place team
- 1st Group C vs 2nd Group A
- 2nd Group B vs 2nd Group C

== 9th–12th place play-offs ==
The worst third placed team plays the best fourth placed team for 9th place; the second best fourth placed team plays the worst fourth placed team for 11th place.

11th place match
19 September
(Ecuador) Fluminense Blasa	2
(Uruguay) Racing Club (a.e.t.)	3

9th place match
19 September
(Peru) Academia Tito Drago	w/o
(Brazil) Vitória

=== 11th place match ===
19 September 2019
16:00

Fluminense Blasa (Ecuador)	2–3 (a.e.t.)	(Uruguay) Racing Club
N. Naranjo; A. Fajardo	Report	Capurro; Cordero

Referee: Juan Gutiérrez (Bolivia)

=== 9th place match ===
19 September 2019
17:30

Academia Tito Drago (Peru)	2–0 w/o (Note: Vitória were forced to forfeit the match due to a lack of available players. As per Regulations Article 85, Academia Tito Drago were awarded with a 2–0 walkover victory.)	(Brazil) Vitória
	Report

Referee: Jaimito Suarez (Bolivia)

== Knockout stage ==
5th place match
20 September
(Colombia) Guaviare	5
(Chile) CODE Iquique	3
7th place match
20 September
(Paraguay) San Bernardino	5
(Bolivia) Hamacas	7

5th–8th place semi-finals
19 September
(Colombia) Guaviare	5
(Paraguay) San Bernardino	4
19 September
(Bolivia) Hamacas	3
(Chile) CODE Iquique	8

Quarterfinals
18 September
(Venezuela) Fundación Monagas (p)	2 (3)
(Colombia) Guaviare	2 (2)
18 September
(Paraguay) Cerro Porteño	8
(Paraguay) San Bernardino	4
18 September
(Brazil) Vasco da Gama	7
(Bolivia) Hamacas	3
18 September
(Chile) CODE Iquique	4
(Argentina) Acassuso	5

Semifinals
20 September
(Venezuela) Fundación Monagas	1
(Paraguay) Cerro Porteño	3
20 September
(Brazil) Vasco da Gama (p)	2 (2)
(Argentina) Acassuso	2 (0)

Final
21 September
(Paraguay) Cerro Porteño	5
(Brazil) Vasco da Gama	7
3rd place match
21 September
(Venezuela) Fundación Monagas	6
(Argentina) Acassuso	7

=== Quarter-finals ===
18 September 2019
16:00

Fundación Monagas (Venezuela)	2–2 (a.e.t.)	(Colombia) Guaviare
R. García; E. Ramos	Report	Córdoba; Perea
Penalties
Bacelar (penalty scored); Narea (penalty scored); R. Ramos (penalty scored)	3–2	(penalty missed) Ortega; (penalty scored) Córdoba; (penalty scored) Perea

Referee: Renato De Carlos (Brazil)

18 September 2019
17:30

Vasco da Gama (Brazil)	7–3	(Bolivia) Hamacas
De Farias; Soares; M. Da Silva	Report	Chávez; Portales; Barrios

Referee: Ramón Blanco (Peru)

18 September 2019
19:00

CODE Iquique (Chile)	4–5	(Argentina) Acassuso
Oyarzún; Vega; Silva	Report	Bordón; Sirico; Medero; Benaducci; De Sosa

Referee: César Cabrera (Paraguay)

18 September 2019
20:30

Cerro Porteño (Paraguay)	8–4	(Paraguay) San Bernardino
Carballo; P. Benítez; Barreto; González	Report	Roa; S. Díaz

Referee: Ivo De Moraes (Brazil)

=== Semi-finals ===
==== 5th–8th place ====
19 September 2019
19:00

Guaviare (Colombia)	5–4	(Paraguay) San Bernardino
Santamaria; Bonilla; Perea; Ortega; Córdoba	Report	Medina; Enciao; S. Díaz

Referee: José Cortez (Ecuador)

19 September 2019
20:30

Hamacas (Bolivia)	3–8	(Chile) CODE Iquique
Beltrán; Cabrera; G. Barrios	Report	Vega; (o.g.) G. Barrios; Peso; Papic; Bolivar; Abarca

Referee: Jorge Gómez (Colombia)

==== 1st–4th place ====
20 September 2019
19:00

Fundación Monagas (Venezuela)	1–3	(Paraguay) Cerro Porteño
García	Report	P. Benítez; Barreto; C. Benítez

Referee: Christian Altez (Uruguay)

20 September 2019
20:30

Vasco da Gama (Brazil)	2–2 (a.e.t.)	(Argentina) Acassuso
Soares; De Farias	Report	Medero
Penalties
B. Da Silva (penalty scored); Souza (penalty scored)	2–0	(penalty missed) Medero; (penalty missed) Benaducci

Referee: Alex Valdiviezo (Peru)

=== Finals ===
==== 7th place match ====
20 September 2019
19:00

Hamacas (Bolivia)	7–5	(Paraguay) San Bernardino
Zambrano; Chávez; Zapata; Portales; G. Barrios	Report	S. Díaz

Referee: Renato De Carlos (Brazil)

==== 5th place match ====
20 September 2019
20:30

Guaviare (Colombia)	5–3	(Chile) CODE Iquique
Perea; Bonilla; Ortega; Córdoba	Report	Bolivar; Vega; Papic

Referee: César Cabrera (Paraguay)

==== 3rd place match ====
21 September 2019
15:00

Fundación Monagas (Venezuela)	6–7	(Argentina) Acassuso
Bacelar; García; R. Ramos; Noriega	Report	Sirico; Medero; Ponzetti; Benaducci; López

Referee: Ivo De Moraes (Brazil)

==== Final ====
21 September 2019
17:00

Cerro Porteño (Paraguay)	5–7	(Brazil) Vasco da Gama
Barreto; Carballo; Ojeda; G. Benítez	Report	De Farias; Soares; Oliveira; Souza

Referee: José Romo (Argentina)

== Final standings ==
Rank	Team	Result
1	(Brazil) Vasco da Gama	Champions (3rd title)
2	(Paraguay) Cerro Porteño	Runners-up
3	(Argentina) Acassuso	Third place
4	(Venezuela) Fundación Monagas	
5	(Colombia) Guaviare	
6	(Chile) CODE Iquique	
7	(Bolivia) Hamacas	
8	(Paraguay) San Bernardino	
9	(Peru) Academia Tito Drago	
10	(Brazil) Vitória	
11	(Uruguay) Racing Club	
12	(Ecuador) Fluminense Blasa	
