= 2016 Copa Libertadores de Beach Soccer =

Tournament details
- Host country: Brazil
- Dates: 9 January – 15 January 2017
- Teams: 9 (from 1 confederation)
- Venue: 1 (in 1 host city)

Final positions
- Champions: (Brazil) Vasco da Gama (1st title)
- Runners-up: (Argentina) Rosario Central
- Third place: (Chile) Deportes Iquique
- Fourth place: Punta Hermosa

Tournament statistics
- Matches played: 24
- Goals scored: 234 (9.75 per match)
- Top scorer: (Brazil) Bokinha (12 goals)
- Best player: (Brazil) Mauricinho
- Best goalkeeper: (Brazil) Rafael Padilha

The 2016 Copa Libertadores de Beach Soccer was the first edition of the Copa Libertadores de Beach Soccer (known natively in Spanish as the Copa Libertadores de Futbol Playa), an annual continental beach soccer club tournament contested between the champions of the domestic leagues of South American nations who are members of CONMEBOL.

Organised by CONMEBOL and Beach Soccer Worldwide (BSWW), the competition took place in Santos, Brazil, hosted on the Praia do Gonzaga. Originally organised to take place from 6 to 11 December 2016, the event was postponed at the request of the Brazilian Football Confederation (CBF) in response to the Chapecoense plane disaster, and eventually took place in January 2017, despite being the 2016 edition of the event.

Brazilian champions Vasco da Gama won the inaugural title after beating Argentinean team Rosario Central 8–1 in the final.

== Format ==
The tournament started with a group stage, played in a round robin format. The winners and runners-up from each group advanced to the knockout stage, in which the teams then competed in single-elimination matches, beginning with the semi-finals and ending with the final. A third-place deciding match was also contested by the losing semi-finalists. The third and fourth placed nations from each group played in a series of consolation matches to decide fifth through eighth place.

== Teams ==
A total of nine teams entered the competition, the winners of each of the respective domestic beach soccer leagues of the members of CONMEBOL, bar Ecuador who did not submit a team.

Association	Representatives
Argentina	Rosario Central
Bolivia	Hamacas FC
Brazil	Vasco da Gama
Chile	Deportes Iquique
Colombia	Santa Marta

Association	Representatives
Ecuador	n/a
Paraguay	Náutico Puerta del Lago
Peru	Punta Hermosa
Uruguay	Malvin
Venezuela	Reales Miranda

== Squads ==
Each team had to submit a squad of 12 players, including a minimum of two goalkeepers, at least 2 weeks before the start of the event (Regulations Article II.A).

== Referees ==
Ten officials were appointed by CONMEBOL on 17 November 2016.

- (Argentina) Mariano Romo
- (Bolivia) José Luis Mendoza
- (Brazil) Ivo De Moraes
- (Brazil) Renato de Carlos
- (Colombia) Juan Carlos Amaya
- (Ecuador) Fabricio Quintero
- (Paraguay) José Luis Martínez
- (Peru) Micke Palomino
- (Uruguay) Pablo Cadenasso
- (Venezuela) José Gregorio Misel

== Draw ==
The draw to split the nine teams into two groups, one of five and one of four, took place on November 26 in Luque, Paraguay at the Auditorio de la Confederación Sudamericana de Fútbol. The teams were seeded based on their national teams' final placement in the 2015 CONMEBOL Beach Soccer Championship. The representative team of the host nation, Brazil, were allocated to Group A.

== Group stage ==
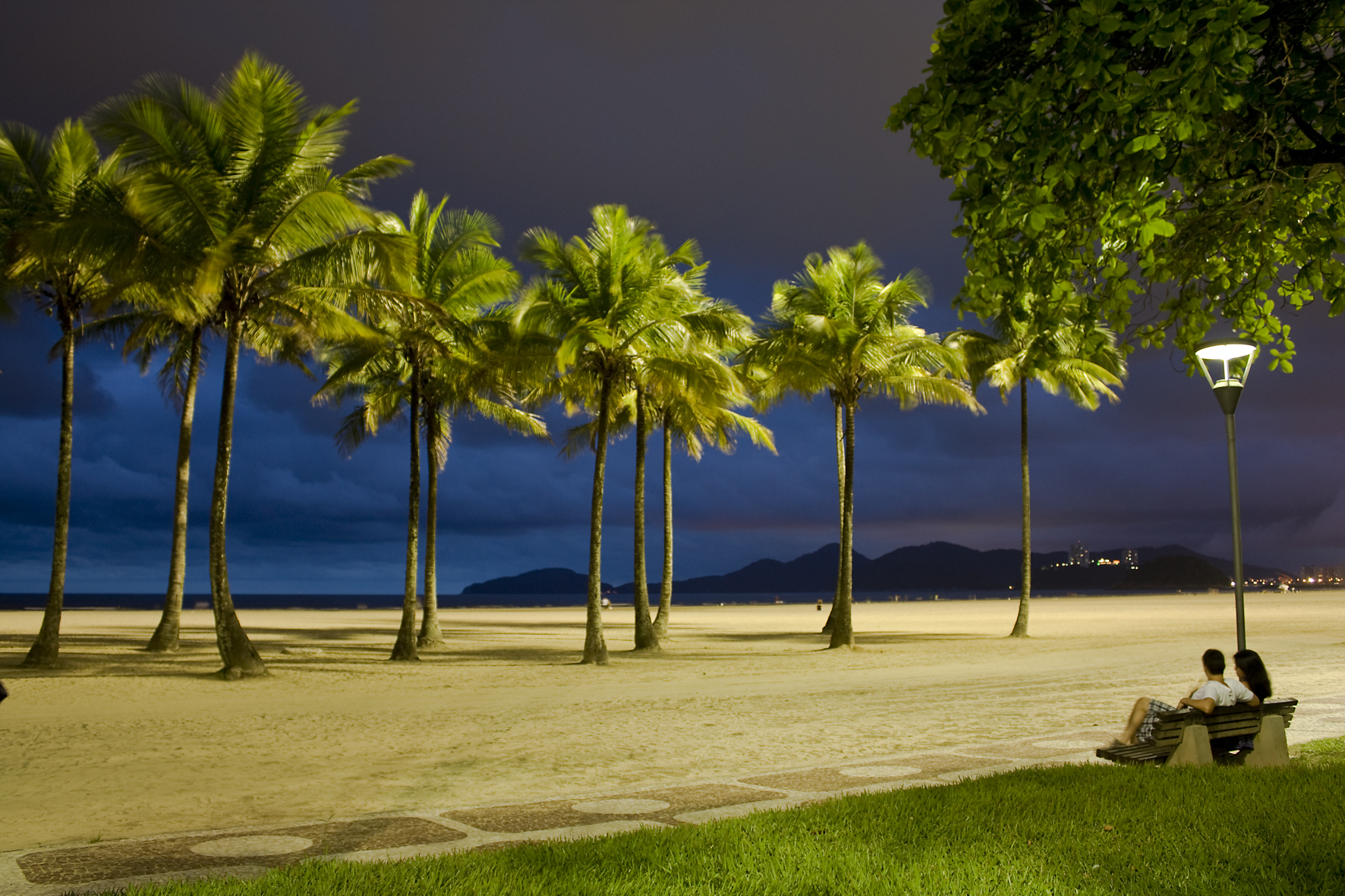
The host beach, Praia do Gonzaga, at night (2009)

Each team earns three points for a win in regulation time, two points for a win in extra time, one point for a win in a penalty shoot-out, and no points for a defeat. The top two teams of each group advance to the semi-finals. The rankings of teams in each group are determined as follows (regulations Article XII.B):

1. points obtained in all group matches;

If two or more teams are equal on the basis of the above criterion, their rankings are determined as follows:

2. points obtained in the group matches between the teams concerned;
3. goal difference in the group matches between the teams concerned;
4. number of goals scored in the group matches between the teams concerned;
5. goal difference in all group matches;
6. number of goals scored in all group matches;
7. fewer number of red cards received;
8. fewer number of yellow cards received;
9. drawing of lots by CONMEBOL and BSWW.

All times were local, BRST (UTC−2)

=== Group A ===
Pos	Team	Pld	W	W+	WP	L	GF	GA	GD	Pts	Qualification
1	(Brazil) Vasco da Gama	4	4	0	0	0	33	9	+24	12	Knockout stage
2	(Chile) Deportes Iquique	4	3	0	0	1	22	18	+4	9	Knockout stage
3	(Uruguay) Malvin	4	1	1	0	2	22	26	−4	5	Consolation matches
4	(Bolivia) Hamacas FC	4	0	0	1	3	15	25	−10	1	Consolation matches
5	(Venezuela) Reales Miranda	4	0	0	0	4	11	25	−14	0	

Source: BSWW

9 January 2017	Malvin (Uruguay)	8–6 (a.e.t.)	(Bolivia) Hamacas FC	Praia do Gonzaga, Santos
16:15		Report(es)

9 January 2017	Reales Miranda (Venezuela)	1–7	(Brazil) Vasco da Gama	Praia do Gonzaga, Santos
17:30		Report(es)

10 January 2017	Hamacas FC (Bolivia)	4–4 (a.e.t.) (3–2 p)	(Venezuela) Reales Miranda	Praia do Gonzaga, Santos
15:00		Report(es)

10 January 2017	Malvin (Uruguay)	4–6	(Chile) Deportes Iquique	Praia do Gonzaga, Santos
17:30		Report(es)

11 January 2017	Deportes Iquique (Chile)	6–3	(Venezuela) Reales Miranda	Praia do Gonzaga, Santos
15:00		Report(es)

11 January 2017	Vasco da Gama (Brazil)	8–1	(Bolivia) Hamacas FC	Praia do Gonzaga, Santos
17:30		Report(es)

12 January 2017	Malvin (Uruguay)	8–3	(Venezuela) Reales Miranda	Praia do Gonzaga, Santos
16:15		Report(es)

12 January 2017	Vasco da Gama (Brazil)	7–5	(Chile) Deportes Iquique	Praia do Gonzaga, Santos
17:30		Report(es)

13 January 2017	Deportes Iquique (Chile)	5–4	(Bolivia) Hamacas FC	Praia do Gonzaga, Santos
15:00		Report(es)

13 January 2017	Vasco da Gama (Brazil)	11–2	(Uruguay) Malvin	Praia do Gonzaga, Santos
17:30		Report(es)

=== Group B ===
Pos	Team	Pld	W	W+	WP	L	GF	GA	GD	Pts	Qualification
1	(Argentina) Rosario Central	3	2	0	0	1	14	12	+2	6	Knockout stage
2	(Peru) Punta Hermosa	3	1	0	1	1	12	13	−1	4	Knockout stage
3	(Colombia) Santa Marta	3	1	0	0	2	9	9	0	3	Consolation matches
4	(Paraguay) Náutico Puerta del Lago	3	1	0	0	2	13	14	−1	3	Consolation matches

Source: BSWW

10 January 2017	Rosario Central (Argentina)	4–5	(Peru) Punta Hermosa	Praia do Gonzaga, Santos
13:45		Report(es)

10 January 2017	Santa Marta (Colombia)	4–2	(Paraguay) Náutico Puerta del Lago	Praia do Gonzaga, Santos
16:15		Report(es)

11 January 2017	Rosario Central (Argentina)	4–2	(Colombia) Santa Marta	Praia do Gonzaga, Santos
13:45		Report(es)

11 January 2017	Náutico Puerta del Lago (Paraguay)	6–4	(Peru) Punta Hermosa	Praia do Gonzaga, Santos
16:15		Report(es)

13 January 2017	Punta Hermosa (Peru)	3–3 (a.e.t.) (2–0 p)	(Colombia) Santa Marta	Praia do Gonzaga, Santos
13:45		Report(es)

13 January 2017	Náutico Puerta del Lago (Paraguay)	5–6	(Argentina) Rosario Central	Praia do Gonzaga, Santos
16:15		Report(es)

== Consolation matches ==
The teams finishing in third and fourth place were knocked out of title-winning contention, receding to play in consolation matches to determine 5th through 8th place in the final standings.

5th–8th place semi-finals
B3	(Colombia) Santa Marta	6
A4	(Bolivia) Hamacas FC	4
A3	(Uruguay) Malvin	6
B4	(Paraguay) Náutico Puerta del Lago	8

Fifth place play-off
B3	(Colombia) Santa Marta	2
B4	(Paraguay) Náutico Puerta del Lago	5
Seventh place play-off
A4	(Bolivia) Hamacas FC	8
A3	(Uruguay) Malvin	10

=== 5th–8th place semi-finals ===
14 January 2017
09:15

Santa Marta (Colombia)	6–4	(Bolivia) Hamacas FC
	Report(es)

Praia do Gonzaga, Santos
14 January 2017
10:30

Malvin (Uruguay)	6–8	(Paraguay) Náutico Puerta del Lago
	Report(es)

Praia do Gonzaga, Santos

=== Seventh place play-off ===
15 January 2017
10:00

Hamacas FC (Bolivia)	8–10	(Uruguay) Malvin
	Report

Praia do Gonzaga, Santos

=== Fifth place play-off ===
15 January 2017
11:15

Santa Marta (Colombia)	2–5	(Paraguay) Náutico Puerta del Lago
	Report

Praia do Gonzaga, Santos

== Knockout stage ==
The group winners and runners-up progressed to the knockout stage to continue to compete for the title.

Semi-finals
B1	(Argentina) Rosario Central (p)	4 (3)
A2	(Chile) Deportes Iquique	4 (2)
A1	(Brazil) Vasco da Gama	11
B2	(Peru) Punta Hermosa	1

Final
B1	(Argentina) Rosario Central	1
A1	(Brazil) Vasco da Gama	8
Third place play-off
A2	(Chile) Deportes Iquique	4
B2	(Peru) Punta Hermosa	1

=== Semi-finals ===
14 January 2017
12:00

Rosario Central (Argentina)	4–4 (a.e.t.)	(Chile) Deportes Iquique
	Report(es)
Penalties
	3–2

Praia do Gonzaga, Santos
14 January 2017
13:15

Vasco da Gama (Brazil)	11–1	(Peru) Punta Hermosa
	Report(es)

Praia do Gonzaga, Santos

=== Third place play-off ===
15 January 2017
12:45

Deportes Iquique (Chile)	4–1	(Peru) Punta Hermosa
	Report

Praia do Gonzaga, Santos

=== Final ===
15 January 2017
14:00

Rosario Central (Argentina)	1–8	(Brazil) Vasco da Gama
	Report(es)

Praia do Gonzaga, Santos

== Awards ==
Top scorer
(Brazil) Bokinha (Vasco da Gama)
12 goals
Best player
(Brazil) Mauricinho (Vasco da Gama)
Best goalkeeper
(Brazil) Rafael Padilha (Vasco da Gama)

== Final standings ==
Rank	Team	Result
1	(Brazil) Vasco da Gama	Champions (1st title)
2	(Argentina) Rosario Central	Runners-up
3	(Chile) Deportes Iquique	Third place
4	Punta Hermosa	
5	Náutico Puerta del Lago	
6	Santa Marta	
7	Malvin	
8	Hamacas FC	
9	Reales Miranda	
