= CR Vasco da Gama (beach soccer) =

Vasco da Gama
- Full name: Vasco da Gama Beach Soccer
- Nicknames: Reis/Rainhas da Areia (Sand Kings/Queens); Trem-bala da Areia (Sand Bullet Train)
- Founded: 1898; 128 years ago (sports club); 1999; 27 years ago (beach soccer)
- Coach: Fábio Costa
Home colours
Away colours

Vasco da Gama Beach Soccer is a Brazilian professional beach soccer team based in Rio de Janeiro. It is a part of the multi-sports club CR Vasco da Gama.

== History ==
The beach soccer division of CR Vasco da Gama was founded in 1999 to compete in the first edition of the Campeonato Carioca, which they won undefeated. The team featured talented players from the Brazil national team such as Júnior Negão, Jorginho, and Benjamim.

The team won the first Mundialito de Clubes in 2011 hosted in São Paulo.

== Honours ==
=== Men's titles ===
==== Official tournaments ====
| Type | Competition | Titles | Seasons |
|---|---|---|---|
| Worldwide | Mundialito de Clubes | 1 | 2011 |
| Continental | Copa Libertadores | 5 | 2016, 2017, 2019, 2024, 2025 |
| National | Circuito Brasil / Campeonato Brasileiro | 4 | 2013–14, 2017, 2019, 2020 |
| National | Copa do Brasil | 3 | 2012, 2014, 2025 |
| National | Supercopa do Brasil | 1 | 2024 |
| Inter-state | Torneio Rio–São Paulo | 1 | 2010 |
| State | Campeonato Carioca | 5 | 1999, 2003, 2014, 2018, 2020 |
| State | Copa Rio | 1 | 2025 |

==== Runners-up ====
- Mundialito de Clubes: 2015
- Copa Libertadores: 2018

=== Women's titles ===
==== Official tournaments ====
| Type | Competition | Titles | Seasons |
|---|---|---|---|
| National | Taça Brasil / Campeonato Brasileiro | 2 | 2012, 2017 |
| National | Copa do Brasil | 1 | 2026 |
| State | Campeonato Carioca | 6 | 2012, 2016, 2017, 2021, 2022, 2024 |
| State | Copa Rio | 1 | 2025 |

==== Runners-up ====
- America's Winners Cup: 2025

== See also ==
- CR Vasco da Gama
- CR Vasco da Gama (women)
- CR Vasco da Gama (basketball)
