= Kirill Romanov (beach soccer) =

Russian beach soccer player

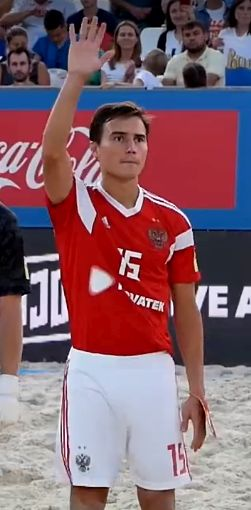

Personal information
- Full name: Kirill Yuryevich Romanov
- Date of birth: 20 January 1990
- Place of birth: Leningrad (now Saint Petersburg), Soviet Union

Team information
- Current team: BSC Kristall
- Number: 15

Senior career*
Years	Team	Apps	(Gls)
2008–2009	TIM (beach soccer)	7	(2)
2009–2012	IBS (beach soccer)	32	(6)
2012–	BSC Kristall (beach soccer)	384	(206)

International career^{‡}
2012–	Russia national beach soccer team	153	(61)
- * Club domestic league appearances and goals as of 20:16, 13 July 2021 (UTC) ‡ National team caps and goals as of 20:16, 13 July 2021 (UTC)

Medal record

Beach soccer

Representing Russia

FIFA Beach Soccer World Cup
Gold medal – first place	2013 Papeete	
Gold medal – first place	2021 Moscow	
Bronze medal – third place	2015 Espinho	
Bronze medal – third place	2019 Luque	

Beach Soccer Intercontinental Cup
Gold medal – first place	2012 Dubai	
Silver medal – second place	2013 Dubai	
Silver medal – second place	2014 Dubai	
Gold medal – first place	2015 Dubai	

European Games
Gold medal – first place	2015 Baku	Team

Euro Beach Soccer Cup
Gold medal – first place	2012 Moscow	

Kirill Yuryevich Romanov (Russian: Кирилл Юрьевич Романов; born 20 January 1990) is a Russian beach soccer player who is playing as forward or defense. Romanov started for TIM and IBS before switching to BSC Kristall, where he is currently serving as captain.

== Career ==
Romanov was born 20 January 1990 in Leningrad. He was introduced to football in Kazakhstan, where his parents emigrated. After returning to Saint Petersburg in 2005 he entered the sports school "Kolomyagi". From 2008 to 2009, Romanov played for TIM and from 2009 to 2012 for IBS, both clubs located in Saint Petersburg. Since the 2011–12 season he is playing for BSC Kristall.

As the captain of BSC Kristall, Romanov scored 206 goals in 384 appearances.

== Personal life ==
Romanov married Irina on 29 September 2017.

== Achievements ==
=== National team ===
- FIFA Beach Soccer World Cup champion: 2013, 2021
- Euro Beach Soccer League champion: 2013, 2014, 2017
- Beach Soccer Intercontinental Cup champion: 2012, 2015

=== Clubs ===
- Russian National Championship champion: 2013, 2015, 2016, 2018, 2019, 2021
- Russian Cup champion: 2015, 2017
- Russian Super Cup champion: 2018
- Euro Winners Cup champion: 2014, 2015
