= Yuri Krasheninnikov =

Russian beach soccer player

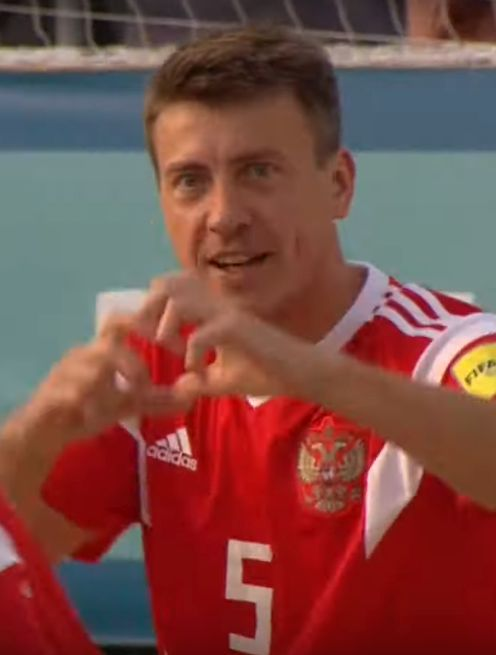

Personal information
- Full name: Yuri Yuryevich Krasheninnikov
- Date of birth: 19 December 1984
- Place of birth: Leningrad (now Saint Petersburg), Soviet Union
- Position: Defender

Team information
- Current team: Kristall

Senior career*
Years	Team	Apps	(Gls)
2008–2009	TIM (beach soccer)		
2009–2011	IBS (beach soccer)		
2011–2013	Lokomotiv Moscow (beach soccer)	57	(23)
2012	Corinthians (beach soccer)		
2014–	Kristall (beach soccer)	320	(170)

International career^{‡}
2009–	Russia national beach soccer team	237	(132)
- * Club domestic league appearances and goals as of 20:19, 13 July 2021 (UTC) ‡ National team caps and goals as of 20:19, 13 July 2021 (UTC)

Medal record

Beach soccer

Representing Russia

FIFA Beach Soccer World Cup
Gold medal – first place	2011 Ravenna	
Gold medal – first place	2013 Papeete	
Gold medal – first place	2021 Moscow	
Bronze medal – third place	2015 Espinho	
Bronze medal – third place	2019 Luque	

Beach Soccer Intercontinental Cup
Gold medal – first place	2011 Dubai	
Gold medal – first place	2012 Dubai	
Silver medal – second place	2013 Dubai	
Silver medal – second place	2014 Dubai	
Gold medal – first place	2015 Dubai	

European Games
Gold medal – first place	2015 Baku	Team

Euro Beach Soccer Cup
Gold medal – first place	2010 Rome	
Gold medal – first place	2012 Moscow	

Yuri Yuryevich "Krash" Krasheninnikov (Russian: Юрий Юрьевич Крашенинников; born 19 December 1984) is a Russian beach soccer player currently active as defender. He is Merited Master of Sports of Russia.

== Career ==
Krasheninnikov graduated from the public school Nr. 453 in Vyborg Rayon. One of his first coaches was Vyacheslav Ivanovich Bulavin.

He started playing for the association football club Zenit. He finished the football school Moscow Outpost, there his coach was Dmitry Yuryevich Stepannikov. Krasheninnikov played for beach soccer clubs including TIM and IBS. Since 2009, he plays for his national team, winning with them numerous trophies. Two years later he joined Lokomotiv Moscow, and since 2014 he plays for Kristall. Krasheninnikov played for the Brazilian Corinthians at the 2012 Mundialito de Clubes.

On 21 December 2012, Krasheninnikov was named Merited Master of Sports by the order of the Sports Minister.

== Achievements ==
=== National team ===
- FIFA Beach Soccer World Cup champion: 2011, 2013, 2021
- Euro Beach Soccer Cup champion: 2010, 2012
- Euro Beach Soccer League champion: 2009, 2011, 2013, 2014, 2017

=== Clubs ===
- Russian National champion: 2010, 2011, 2012, 2015, 2016, 2018, 2019, 2021
- Russian Cup champion: 2011, 2012, 2013, 2015
- Russian Super Cup: 2011

=== Individually ===
- 2019 FIFA Beach Soccer World Cup qualification – Most Valuable Player
- Merited Master of Sports (21 December 2012)
