= 2021 Beach Soccer Intercontinental Cup =

Tournament details
- Host country: United Arab Emirates
- City: Dubai
- Dates: 2–6 November
- Teams: 8 (from 4 confederations)
- Venue: 1 (in 1 host city)

Final positions
- Champions: Russia (4th title)
- Runners-up: Iran
- Third place: Senegal
- Fourth place: Portugal

Tournament statistics
- Matches played: 20
- Goals scored: 211 (10.55 per match)
- Top scorer: (Spain) Chiky Ardil (9 goals)
- Best player: (Russia) Boris Nikonorov
- Best goalkeeper: (Iran) Hamid Behzadpour

The Tecnotree Beach Soccer Intercontinental Cup 2021 was the tenth edition of the Beach Soccer Intercontinental Cup, an annual international beach soccer tournament contested by men's national teams. After not being held in 2020 because of the COVID-19 pandemic, it returned once again being held in Dubai, United Arab Emirates that host the tournament since its inception. This year's event occurred between 2 and 6 November. The tournament was organised by the Dubai Sports Council (TSC) and Beach Soccer Worldwide (BSWW). The sponsor was Tecnotree.

The Intercontinental Cup was typically seen as the biggest tournament in the current international beach soccer calendar after the FIFA Beach Soccer World Cup. Similar in nature to that of the FIFA Confederations Cup, eight nations took part.

The tournament started with a round robin group stage. The winners and runners-up from each group advanced to the knockout stage, a series of single-elimination matches, beginning with the semi-finals and ending with the final. Consolation matches are also played to determine other final rankings.

The season-ending Beach Soccer Stars awards were also presented in Dubai as a conclusion to the tournament.

Iran were the two-time defending champions, but they were defeated in the final.

== Participating teams ==
The following eight teams took part.

Team	Confederation	Recent achievements	Participation
United Arab Emirates	AFC	Hosts	10th
Iran	AFC	2019 Beach Soccer Intercontinental Cup winners	8th
Japan	AFC	2019 AFC Beach Soccer Championship winners	4th
Senegal	CAF	2018 Africa Beach Soccer Cup of Nations winners	debut
Paraguay	CONMEBOL	2021 FIFA Beach Soccer World Cup qualification (CONMEBOL) third-place	2nd
Russia	UEFA	2021 FIFA Beach Soccer World Cup winners	10th
Spain	UEFA	2021 FIFA Beach Soccer World Cup qualification (UEFA) winners	3rd
Portugal	UEFA	2021 Euro Beach Soccer League winners	4th

== Group stage ==
Matches are listed as local time in Dubai, GST (UTC+4)

=== Group A ===
Pos	Team	Pld	W	W+	WP	L	GF	GA	GD	Pts	Qualification
1	Senegal	3	2	0	0	1	17	13	+4	6	Knockout stage
2	Portugal	3	2	0	0	1	16	14	+2	6	Knockout stage
3	United Arab Emirates	3	1	0	1	1	12	12	0	4	5th–8th place play-offs
4	Spain	3	0	0	0	3	14	20	−6	0	5th–8th place play-offs

Source: BSWW
2 November 2021
16:00

Portugal	4–7	Senegal
Pintado 1'; L. Martins 24'; Torres 17'; Pinhal 24'		Mendy 3', 35' (pen.); Sylla 4', 22'; Diatta 14', 26'; Mam. Diagne 22'

2 November 2021
17:15

United Arab Emirates	6–4	Spain
Walid 6'; Waleed Beshr 7', 34'; Malahi 20'; Ahmed Beshr 21'; Abbas 24'		Joselito 6', 24', 27'; Suárez 34'

3 November 2021
16:00

Spain	6–7	Senegal
Chiky 3', 12', 32'; Cassano 12'; José Arias 14'; Cintas 26'		Diatta 2', 8'; Samb 11', 12', 29'; Mam. Diagne 31'; Boye 36'

3 November 2021
17:15

United Arab Emirates	3–5	Portugal
Walid 16'; Abbas 17', 23'		B. Martins 3', 34'; Brilhante 16'; Lourenço 16'; L. Martins 22'

4 November 2021
17:15

Portugal	7–4	Spain
Von 6'; B. Martins 10'; Brilhante 12'; Pintado 21'; L. Martins 21'; Lourenço 28'; Pinhal 29'		Cintas 23'; Chiky 29' (pen.), 34', 34'

4 November 2021
18:45

Senegal	3–3 (a.e.t.)	United Arab Emirates
Samb 1'; Seydina 1' (pen.); Diatta 34'		Waleed 11' (pen.); Ahmed 17', 20'
Penalties
Sylla (penalty scored); Mam. Diagne (penalty missed); Seydina (penalty scored); Man. Diagne (penalty scored); Diatta (penalty scored)	4–5	(penalty scored) Abbas; (penalty scored) Hasan; (penalty scored) Kamal; (penalty scored) Malahi; (penalty scored) Waleed

=== Group B ===
Pos	Team	Pld	W	W+	WP	L	GF	GA	GD	Pts	Qualification
1	Russia	3	2	1	0	0	19	16	+3	8	Knockout stage
2	Iran	3	2	0	0	1	17	11	+6	6	Knockout stage
3	Paraguay	3	0	1	0	2	19	20	−1	2	5th–8th place play-offs
4	Japan	3	0	0	0	3	11	19	−8	0	5th–8th place play-offs

Source: BSWW
2 November 2021
18:45

Russia	7–6 (a.e.t.)	Japan
Nikonorov 2', 4' (pen.), 22', 32'; Paporotnyi 3'; Novikov 34'; Kotenev 37'		Okuyama 4' (pen.), 22'; Yamauchi 16', 23'; Ozu 26', 34'

2 November 2021
20:00

Iran	8–6	Paraguay
Shir 20', 32'; Kiani 20'; Moradi 22', 28'; Mokhtari 24', 24'; Akbari 36'		M. Medina 3', 24', 32'; V. Benítez 4' (pen.); N. Medina 12'; Carballo 35'

3 November 2021
18:45

Paraguay	7–8	Russia
Escobar 7'; Ojeda 10', 18', 34'; V. Benitez 17'; Cantero 26'; M. Medina 30'		Zemskov 1', 13', 25'; Krash 2'; Parkhomenko 3'; Kotenev 3'; Paporotnyi 9'; Nikonorov 20'

3 November 2021
20:00

Iran	6–1	Japan
Mokhtari 14'; Shir 23'; Kiani 27'; Movahed 32'; Mirshekari 35'; Abdollahi 36'		Okuyama 33'

4 November 2021
16:00

Japan	4–6 (a.e.t.)	Paraguay
Akaguma 3'; Ozu 6'; Yamauchi 12'; Oba 33'		V. Benitez 4'; Rolon 7'; N. Medina 12', 13', 35'; Escobar 34'

4 November 2021
20:00

Russia	4–3	Iran
Korsharnyi 10'; Shkarin 14'; Kotenev 24'; Krasheninnikov 24'		Akbari 3'; Moradi 32'; Ahmadzadeh 35'

== 5th–8th place play-offs ==
The teams finishing in third and fourth place are knocked out of title-winning contention, receding to play in consolation matches to determine 5th through 8th place in the final standings.

5th–8th place semi-finals
5 November
United Arab Emirates	4
Japan	6
5 November
Paraguay	4
Spain	5

Fifth place play-off
6 November
Japan	5
Spain	4
Seventh place play-off
6 November
United Arab Emirates	3
Paraguay	8

=== 5th–8th place semi-finals ===
5 November 2021
16:00

Paraguay	4–5	Spain
Carballo 1'; M. Medina 1', 12'; N. Medina 35'		Chiky 9', 11', 2'; Cassano 18'; Domingo 32'

5 November 2021
17:15

United Arab Emirates	4–6	Japan
Abbas 13'; Waleed 16'; Ali 33'; Hasan 33'		Okuyama 2'; Oba 12', 35'; Matsuoka 26'; Akaguma 30'; Tanaka 35'

=== Seventh place play-off ===
6 November 2021
15:00

United Arab Emirates	3–8	Paraguay
Ahmed 23'; Walid 20'; Malahi 18'	Report	V. Benitez 3', 9', 17'; G. Benitez 8', 20'; Escobar 19', 29'; Medina 26'

=== Fifth place play-off ===
6 November 2021
16:15

Japan	5–4	Spain
Ozu 10', 13', 34'; Okuyama 11'; Matsuo 32'	Report	Joselito 3', 35'; Eduard 32', 34'

== Knockout stage ==
Semi-finals
5 November
Russia	7
Portugal	3
5 November
Senegal	5
Iran	7

Final
6 November
Russia	3
Iran	2
Third place play-off
6 November
Portugal	4
Senegal	7

=== Semi finals ===
5 November 2021
18:45

Russia	7–3	Portugal
Kotenev 2'; Zemskov 7', 20', 35'; Paporotniy 15'; Kosharniy 19', 28'		Lourenço 13'; L. Martins 14'; Bernardo 20'

5 November 2021
20:00

Senegal	5–7	Iran
Diagne 7', 7', 9'; Raoul 14'; Madione 30'		Mokthari 6', 11', 25'; Moradi 18'; Akbari 23'; Mirshekari 29'; Ahmadzadeh 36'

=== Third place play-off ===
6 November 2021
17:30

Portugal	4–7	Senegal
Lourenço 6'; Pintado 13'; Andrade 23'; Bernardo 28'	Report	Sylla 6', 16'; Seyni 8'; Madione 15', 24', 26'; Diatta 19'

=== Final ===
6 November 2021
19:00

Russia	3–2	Iran
Nikonorov 3', 12', 18'		Mokthari 24', 36'

== Awards ==
=== Winners trophy ===
2021 Beach Soccer Intercontinental Cup
champions

Russia
4th title

== Statistics ==
=== Final standings ===
Pos	Grp	Team	Pld	W	W+	WP	L	GF	GA	GD	Pts	Final result
1	B	Russia	5	4	1	0	0	29	21	+8	14	Champions
2	B	Iran	5	3	0	0	2	26	19	+7	9	Runners-up
3	A	Senegal	5	3	0	0	2	29	24	+5	9	Third place
4	A	Portugal	5	2	0	0	3	23	28	−5	6	
5	B	Japan	5	2	0	0	3	22	27	−5	6	Eliminated in Group stage
6	A	Spain	5	1	0	0	4	23	29	−6	3	Eliminated in Group stage
7	B	Paraguay	5	1	1	0	3	31	28	+3	5	Eliminated in Group stage
8	A	United Arab Emirates	5	1	0	1	3	19	26	−7	4	Eliminated in Group stage

Source: BSWW
