= 2009 Euro Beach Soccer League =

Tournament details
- Host countries: Italy; England; France; Portugal
- Dates: 10 July – 23 August
- Teams: 18 (from 1 confederation)
- Venues: 5 (in 5 host cities)

Final positions
- Champions: Russia (1st title)
- Runners-up: Portugal
- Third place: Italy
- Fourth place: Spain

Tournament statistics
- Matches played: 51
- Goals scored: 411 (8.06 per match)

The EBSL underwent major format changes in 2009 and as such underwent graphical rebranding too, including the introduction of a new logo shown above. This logo continued to be used for another six seasons until its last use in 2015.

The 2009 Euro Beach Soccer League, was the twelfth edition of the Euro Beach Soccer League (EBSL), the premier beach soccer competition contested between European men's national teams, occurring annually since its establishment in 1998. The league was organised by Beach Soccer Worldwide (BSWW) between July 10 and August 23, 2009.

In 2009, BSWW introduced major changes to the EBSL. This included the reintroduction of Divisions A and B to the league, and making the Superfinal a Division A only event; the opportunity for Division B teams to qualify for the Superfinal was replaced with having the nations of the second division aim to qualify for a new additional post season event instead, the Promotion Final, in which nations would compete to try and earn promotion to Division A, as well as other changes explained later.

Portugal were the defending champions but fell short in the championship match of the Superfinal, losing to Russia who claimed their first European title. Meanwhile, in Division B, Romania were promoted after winning the inaugural edition of the Promotion Final, with Norway relegated from Division A in return.

== Format changes ==
2009 saw the introduction of major changes to the format of this and future seasons of the EBSL which have remained almost unchanged to date (2017). The following decisions were made:

=== Restructure of stages and divisions ===
- The concept of Divisions A and B were reintroduced after they were scrapped in 2008.
- Division A and B fixtures will take place simultaneously throughout the regular season (rather than teams in Division B starting and completing all of their scheduled fixtures before the nations of Division A even begin their season as was the case in 2006 and 2007).
- Between 2002 and 2007, Divisions A and B hosted their own stages separately, taking place in different locations and during different dates. This format was discarded. It was decided from now on, each stage that is organised will host both Division A and Division B fixtures together, in the same place and during the same dates.
- Historically, each season BSWW allocated teams to Division A and B at the start each season, with teams often being moved back and forth between divisions, year on year, without going through an official promotion or relegation process. It was decided the same nations would now take part in each division season after season (barring promoted and relegated teams as explained below).

=== Introduction of the Promotion Final ===
- Teams in Division A will compete to earn enough points for the regular season league table to qualify for the Superfinal season-finale event in which the league title is then to be contested directly (just as has been the Superfinal's purpose since its introduction to the EBSL in 2001).
- Unlike Division B's last incarnation between 2002 and 2007, from now on, teams from Division B can no longer qualify for the Superfinal – the Superfinal is now exclusively for Division A teams.
- Teams in Division B will now compete to earn enough points for the regular season league table to qualify for a new postseason event – the Promotion Final.
- The Division B team which wins the Promotion Final will be promoted into Division A the following season (except for in the scenario below).
- The team bottom of the Division A regular season table will also take part in the Promotion Final to try and defend their place. If they win the event, they will retain their Division A status for the next season and so no Division B team will be promoted that year.

== Schedule ==
Stage	Dates	Country	City	Div. A	Div. B
1	10–12 July	Italy	Lignano Sabbiadoro	Yes	Yes
2	17–19 July	England	Minehead	Yes	Yes
3	29–31 July	France	Béziers	Yes	Yes
4	11–13 August	Italy	Ostia	Yes	No
Sf (Note: Superfinal)	20–23 August	Portugal	Vila Real de Santo António	Yes	No
PF (Note: Promotion Final)	20–23 August	Portugal	Vila Real de Santo António	No	Yes

== Teams ==
Division A (8)			Division B (10)			
France	Italy	Norway	Andorra	Azerbaijan	Belarus	Czech Republic
Poland	Portugal	Russia	England	Germany	Greece	Netherlands
Spain	Switzerland		Romania	Turkey (Note: Turkey were supposed to compete with Austria and another, as of then, unconfirmed team as part of stage 4. Ultimately Austria pulled out and no other team entered meaning Division B did not materialise during stage 4. Turkey therefore automatically qualified for the Promotion Final and consequently did not compete during the regular season.)		

== Stage 1 (Lignano Sabbiadoro, 10–12 July) ==
Stage winners (Division A)
Stage winners (Division B)

=== Division A ===
Pos	Team	Pld	W	W+	L	GF	GA	GD	Pts
1	Russia	3	2	0	1	11	11	0	6
2	Italy	3	1	1	1	14	12	+2	5
3	Switzerland	3	1	0	2	18	11	+7	3
4	Poland	3	1	0	2	8	17	–9	3

10 July 2009

Italy	1–2	Poland

10 July 2009

Russia	2–1	Switzerland

11 July 2009

Italy	7–6 (a.e.t.)	Switzerland

11 July 2009

Russia	5–4	Poland

12 July 2009

Italy	6–4	Russia

12 July 2009

Switzerland	11–2	Poland

Awards
Best player: (Italy) Roberto Pasquali
Top scorer(s): (Switzerland) Dejan Stankovic (13 goals)
Best goalkeeper: (Russia) Andrey Bukhlitskiy

=== Division B ===
Pos	Team	Pld	W	W+	L	GF	GA	GD	Pts
1	Romania	2	2	0	0	8	3	+5	6
2	Greece	2	1	0	1	11	4	+7	3
3	Andorra	2	0	0	2	2	14	–12	0

10 July 2009

Greece	9–1	Andorra

11 July 2009

Romania	5–1	Andorra

12 July 2009

Romania	3–2	Greece

== Stage 2 (Minehead, 17–19 July) ==
Stage winners (Division A)
Stage winners (Division B)

=== Division A ===
Pos	Team	Pld	W	W+	L	GF	GA	GD	Pts
1	Portugal	3	3	0	0	27	11	+16	9
2	Switzerland	3	1	0	2	16	16	0	3
3	Norway	3	1	0	2	10	21	–11	3
4	France	3	1	0	2	9	14	–5	3

Norway are ranked ahead of France based on their head-to-head result

17 July 2009

France	4–3	Switzerland

17 July 2009

Portugal	11–3	Norway

18 July 2009

Norway	5–3	France

18 July 2009

Portugal	10–6	Switzerland

19 July 2009

Portugal	6–2	France

19 July 2009

Switzerland	7–2	Norway

Awards
Best player: (Portugal) Zé Maria
Top scorer(s): (N/A) ?
Best goalkeeper: (Portugal) Bruno Silva

=== Division B ===
Pos	Team	Pld	W	W+	L	GF	GA	GD	Pts
1	Azerbaijan	2	2	0	0	10	7	+3	6
2	England	2	1	0	1	7	7	0	3
3	Germany	2	0	0	2	7	10	–3	0

17 July 2009

Azerbaijan	6–4	Germany

18 July 2009

England	4–3	Germany

19 July 2009

England	3–4	Azerbaijan

== Stage 3 (Béziers, 29–31 July) ==
Stage winners (Division A)
Stage winners (Division B)

=== Division A ===
Pos	Team	Pld	W	W+	L	GF	GA	GD	Pts
1	Spain	3	2	0	1	13	8	+5	6
2	Russia	3	2	0	1	13	13	0	6
3	Poland	3	1	0	2	15	15	0	3
4	France	3	0	1	2	9	14	–5	2

29 July 2009

France	4–8	Poland

29 July 2009

Spain	6–3	Russia

30 July 2009

France	2–2 (a.e.t.)	Spain
Penalties
	3–2

30 July 2009

Russia	6–4	Poland

31 July 2009

Spain	5–3	Poland

31 July 2009

France	3–4	Russia

Awards
Top scorer(s): (Spain) Amarelle (8 goals)

=== Division B ===
Pos	Team	Pld	W	W+	L	GF	GA	GD	Pts
1	Belarus	2	2	0	0	11	8	+3	6
2	Netherlands	2	1	0	1	12	12	0	3
3	Czech Republic	2	0	0	2	14	17	–3	0

29 July 2009

Belarus	4–2	Netherlands

30 July 2009

Belarus	7–6	Czech Republic

31 July 2009

Netherlands	10–8	Czech Republic

== Stage 4 (Ostia, 11–13 August) ==
Stage winners

=== Division A ===
Pos	Team	Pld	W	W+	L	GF	GA	GD	Pts
1	Italy	3	2	0	1	25	16	+9	6
2	Spain	3	2	0	1	21	15	+6	6
3	Portugal	3	1	1	1	23	15	+8	5
4	Norway	3	0	0	3	6	29	–23	0

11 August 2009

Italy	8–4	Spain

11 August 2009

Portugal	8–2	Norway

12 August 2009

Italy	6–9 (a.e.t.)	Portugal

12 August 2009

Spain	10–1	Norway

13 August 2009

Italy	11–3	Norway

13 August 2009

Spain	7–6	Portugal

Awards
Best player: (Spain) Amarelle
Top scorer(s): (Italy) Paolo Palmacci (8 goals)
Best goalkeeper: (Italy) Stefano Spada

== Tables ==
Advanced to the Superfinal
Advanced to the Promotion Final

=== Division A ===
Pos	Team	Pld	W	W+	L	GF	GA	GD	Pts
1	Portugal	6	4	1	1	50	26	+24	14
2	Spain	6	4	0	2	34	23	+11	12
3	Russia	6	4	0	2	24	24	0	12
4	Italy	6	3	1	2	39	28	+11	11
5	Switzerland	6	2	0	4	34	27	+7	6
6	Poland	6	2	0	4	23	32	–9	6
7	France	6	1	1	4	18	28	–10	5
8	Norway	6	1	0	5	16	50	–34	3

=== Division B ===
Pos	Team	Pld	W	W+	L	GF	GA	GD	Pts
1	Romania	2	2	0	0	8	3	+5	6
2	Belarus	2	2	0	0	11	8	+3	6
3	Azerbaijan	2	2	0	0	10	7	+3	6
4	Greece	2	1	0	1	11	4	+7	3
5	Netherlands	2	1	0	1	12	12	0	3
6	England	2	1	0	1	7	7	0	3
7	Czech Republic	2	0	0	2	14	17	–3	0
8	Germany	2	0	0	2	7	10	–3	0
9	Andorra	2	0	0	2	2	14	–12	0

== Promotion Final (Vila Real de Santo António, 20–23 August) ==
=== Teams ===
- Azerbaijan
- Belarus
- Greece
- Norway – worst ranked in Division A (attempting to defend their place)
- Romania
- Turkey – received a bye straight into the Promotion Final

=== Group stage ===
Advanced to the final

==== Group A ====
Pos	Team	Pld	W	W+	L	GF	GA	GD	Pts
1	Romania	2	2	0	0	8	5	+3	6
2	Belarus	2	0	1	1	5	6	–1	2
3	Turkey	2	0	0	2	6	8	–2	0

20 August 2009

Romania	5–3	Turkey

21 August 2009

Belarus	3–3 (a.e.t.)	Turkey
Penalties
	2–1

22 August 2009

Romania	3–2	Belarus

==== Group B ====
Pos	Team	Pld	W	W+	L	GF	GA	GD	Pts
1	Greece	2	2	0	0	13	3	+10	6
2	Azerbaijan	2	1	0	1	6	7	–1	3
3	Norway	2	0	0	2	3	12	–9	0

20 August 2009

Greece	8–1	Norway

21 August 2009

Greece	5–2	Azerbaijan

22 August 2009

Azerbaijan	4–2	Norway

=== Placement stage ===
==== Fifth place play-off ====
23 August 2009

Turkey	4–0	Norway

==== Third place play-off ====
23 August 2009

Belarus	3–2 (a.e.t.)	Azerbaijan

==== Final ====
23 August 2009

Romania	5–2	Greece

=== Final standings ===
Pos	Team	Notes
1	Romania	Promoted to 2010 EBSL Division A
2	Greece	
3	Belarus	
4	Azerbaijan	
5	Turkey	
6	Norway	Relegated to 2010 EBSL Division B

== Superfinal (Vila Real de Santo António, 20–23 August) ==
=== Teams ===
- Italy
- Poland
- Portugal
- Russia
- Spain
- Switzerland

=== Group stage ===
Advanced to the final

==== Group A ====
Pos	Team	Pld	W	W+	L	GF	GA	GD	Pts
1	Russia	2	0	2	0	7	5	+2	4
2	Spain	2	1	0	1	11	8	+3	3
3	Switzerland	2	0	0	2	6	11	–5	0

20 August 2009

Russia	3–2 (a.e.t.)	Switzerland

21 August 2009

Spain	8–4	Switzerland

22 August 2009

Russia	4–3 (a.e.t.)	Spain

==== Group B ====
Pos	Team	Pld	W	W+	L	GF	GA	GD	Pts
1	Portugal	2	2	0	0	14	7	+7	6
2	Italy	2	0	1	1	8	10	–2	2
3	Poland	2	0	0	2	4	9	–5	0

20 August 2009

Italy	3–2 (a.e.t.)	Poland

21 August 2009

Portugal	6–2	Poland

22 August 2009

Portugal	8–5	Italy

=== Placement stage ===
==== Fifth place play-off ====
23 August 2009

Switzerland	4–2	Poland

==== Third place play-off ====
23 August 2009

Italy	4–4 (a.e.t.)	Spain
Penalties
	1–0

==== Final ====
23 August 2009

Portugal	3–4	Russia
Bruno Novo 9'; Zé Maria 21'; Belchoir 32'	Report	1' Shaykov; 14' Leonov; 7', 20' Makarov

2009 Euro Beach Soccer League
champions

Russia
First title

=== Awards ===
Top scorer(s)
(Italy) Paolo Palmacci	(Portugal) Madjer
7 goals
Best player
(Portugal) Madjer
Best goalkeeper
(Russia) Andrey Bukhlitskiy

=== Final standings ===
Pos	Team	Notes
1	Russia	2009 EBSL Champions
2	Portugal	runners-up
3	Italy	Third place
4	Spain	
5	Switzerland	
6	Poland	

== Sources ==
- Roonba
- BSWW
- beachsoccer.ru (in Russian)
- beachsoccerrussia.ru (in Russian)
