= Egor Shaykov =

Russian football and beach soccer player (born 1980)

Personal information
- Full name: Egor Mikhailovich Shaykov
- Date of birth: 23 June 1980 (age 46)
- Place of birth: Moscow, Soviet Union
- Height: 1.83 m (6 ft 0 in)
- Position: Forward

Youth career
- 1997–1998: Torpedo-ZIL Moscow

Senior career*
Years	Team	Apps	(Gls)
1998–2000	Torpedo-Luzhniki-d Moscow	29	(4)
2000–2002	Spartak Shchyolkovo	76	(27)
2002–2004	Arsenal Tula	49	(9)
2004	Titan Klin	16	(1)
2005	Arsenal Tula	23	(7)
2005–2010	Strogino (beach soccer)		
2010	Delta (beach soccer)		
2010–2018	Lokomotiv Moscow (beach soccer)	60	(34)

International career^{‡}
2005–2018	Russia national beach soccer team		

Managerial career
- 2018–: Academy (Linden City)
- * Club domestic league appearances and goals as of 20 May 2018 ‡ National team caps and goals as of 20 May 2018

Medal record

Beach soccer

Representing Russia

FIFA Beach Soccer World Cup
Gold medal – first place	2011 Ravenna	
Gold medal – first place	2013 Papeete	
Silver medal – second place	2007 Rio de Janeiro	
Bronze medal – third place	2015 Espinho	

Beach Soccer Intercontinental Cup
Gold medal – first place	2011 Dubai	
Gold medal – first place	2012 Dubai	
Silver medal – second place	2013 Dubai	
Silver medal – second place	2014 Dubai	
Gold medal – first place	2015 Dubai	

European Games
Gold medal – first place	2015 Baku	Team

Euro Beach Soccer Cup
Gold medal – first place	2012 Moscow	
Silver medal – second place	2005 Moscow	

Egor Mikhailovich Shaykov (Russian: Егор Михайлович Шайков; born 23 June 1980) is a former Russian association football and beach soccer player who was active as forward. Shaykov started his career in association football, his best results coming from the period where he played for FC Arsenal Tula. Since 2005, he played for beach soccer teams, his best results coming for BSC Lokomotiv Moscow, where he played from 2010 until his retirement in 2018. He is Merited Master of Sports of Russia.

== Playing career ==
Shaykov was sportive since early age. He went to swimming for three years until he switched to ice hockey at the age of seven, but he felt it was not his type of sports. Once Shaykov's sports teacher recommended him to Nikolay Nikolayevich Sevastyanov, who would become Shaykov's first coach. Sevastyanov went to different schools searching for possible pupils for his club of the large sports school Torpedo. Preliminarily, out of eight people Shaykov was the only one to be chosen.

Shaykov started his career for the association football team Torpedo-ZIL Moscow and then for the mirror team Torpedo-Luzhniki (now Torpedo Moscow). He played for FC Arsenal Tula for three years, collecting 12 goals in 76 caps; one of his goals was the 800th for Arsenal at the Russian Championships. He then played for FC Titan Klin for around half a year before making a short break.

In 2005, he was invited by future beach soccer top coach Evgeny Pisarev to play for the Russia national beach soccer team. In their first tournament at the 2005 Euro Beach Soccer Cup team Russia finished second. Shaykov then debuted for BSC Strogino.

In 2010, Shaykov switched to BSC Delta together with three other teammates, but in the same year he debuted for BSC Lokomotiv Moscow.

On 21 December 2012, Shaykov was named Merited Master of Sports by the order of the Sports Minister.

At the inaugural 2013 Euro Winners Cup, Lokomotiv went on to win the trophy and Shaykov was named MVP.

Shaykov's last appearance in beach soccer was as a player of Lokomotiv at the Russian Super Cup, where the Moscow club lost to BSC Kristall, 3–4.

== Coaching career ==
After his retirement, Shaykov serves as coach for the Latvian beach soccer club "Academy" (also known as "Linden City"). He brought them to the final of the Latvia Cup, where they defeated Krass, 5–1.

== Honours ==
- Russian National champion: 2008, 2009, 2010, 2011, 2012, 2017
- Russian Cup winner: 2008, 2009, 2011, 2012, 2013
- Russian Super Cup winner: 2011
- Euro Winners Cup winner: 2013
- Mundialito de Clubes winner: 2012
- FIFA Beach Soccer World Cup champion: 2011, 2013
- Euro Beach Soccer Cup champion: 2012
- Euro Beach Soccer League champion: 2009, 2011, 2013, 2014, 2017
- Beach Soccer Intercontinental Cup champion: 2011, 2012, 2015

Individual

- 2011 season
  - Euro Beach Soccer League, Stage 4 – MVP
- 2012 season
  - Merited Master of Sports (21 December 2012)
