= Russia national beach soccer team =

Russia
- Nickname: Наши парни (Our Boys)
- Association: Russian Football Union
- Confederation: UEFA (Europe)
- Head coach: Mikhail Likhachev
- Captain: Anton Shkarin
- Most caps: Anton Shkarin (285)
- Top scorer: Dmitry Shishin (235)
- FIFA code: RUS
- BSWW ranking: 2 (2 September 2026)
First colours
Second colours

First international
- Italy 5–1 Russia (Rio-de-Janeiro, Brazil; 30 January 1996)

Biggest win
- Russia 15–0 Uzbekistan (Minsk, Belarus; 6 August 2023)

Biggest defeat
- Brazil 7–0 Russia (Dubai, UAE; 4 November 2016)

World Cup
- Appearances: 8 (first in 2007)
- Best result: (gold) Champions(2011, 2013, 2021)

Euro Beach Soccer League
- Appearances: 13 (first in 2007)
- Best result: (gold) Champions(2009, 2011, 2013, 2014, 2017)

Euro Beach Soccer Cup
- Appearances: 6 (first in 2005)
- Best result: (gold) Champions(2010, 2012)

The Russia national beach soccer team (Russian: Сборная России по пляжному футболу, Sbornaya Rossii po plyazhnomu futbolu) represents Russia in international beach soccer competitions and is controlled by the Russian Football Union, the governing body for football in Russia. The team's highest achievements are three World Cup crowns conquered in 2011, 2013 and 2021.

== History ==
The Serebryany Bor, specifically Beach No. 3, is said to be the birthplace of Russian beach soccer. Players including Andrey Bukhlitskiy and Egor Eremeev used that beach for training and fun games.

Russia debuted at the 1996 Beach Soccer World Championship, with a squad including Vagiz Khidiyatullin, Vyacheslav Chanov and Andrei Yakubik. In their first match against Italy, Russia lost 1–5, which is one of their biggest losses to date. Notwithstanding the overall fifth place at the Championships, beach soccer was not supported by the government for the next 10 years. In 2005, Nikolai Pisarev and other sportsmen suggested Sport's Minister Vitaly Mutko reviving the Russian national beach soccer team. Mutko supported the idea and in the same year Russia participated at the Euro Beach Soccer Cup, sending Mostovoi, Karpin, Nikiforov, Lediakhov, Kiriakov and Popov. Furthermore, one Brazilian consulted the team.

In the following years, Russia progressed. In 2007, players such as Makarov, Shkarin and Bukhlitskiy debuted for the team. That year Russia became third at the Euro Beach Soccer Cup. At the 2007 FIFA Beach Soccer World Cup, Russia finished ninth, and in the following year already sixth. Since Mikhail Likhachev's appointment as head coach in 2010, the team of Russia won the 2011 and 2013 FIFA Beach Soccer World Cup. One of the exceptions was the insufficient result from the World Cup qualification tournament, where Russia was placed 5th at the end and so missed the opportunity to qualify for the 2017 World Cup.

There was some regress for Russia in the 2018 season. While they traditionally played well in the Moscow stage of the Euro Beach Soccer League, winning the group which included the teams of Switzerland, Azerbaijan and Poland, and finishing second in the last Stage in Warnemünde, losing only to Spain, Russia placed second in their team after Italy and so qualified for the 3rd-place match, where they lost to Portugal after penalty shoot-out. For the first time Russia did not finish within the top 3. They rebounded in the Intercontinental Cup, defeating Tahiti and the United States in the group stage. In the semifinals they defeated Brazil after penalty shoot-out, ending the South American's 66-game winning streak, but the Russians were defeated by Iran in the final.

Russia started well in the next season. They qualified for the inaugural World Beach Games after beating Norway, Ukraine, Switzerland and Spain, and proceeded to win silver at that tournament. The team then finished just 6th at the European Games. At the Euro Beach Soccer League, in the first stage, Russia was again placed 2nd in their group after Spain, but still qualified for the Superfinal. Russia rebounded in the FIFA World Cup qualification in Moscow, beating all of their eight opponents to win the title for the second time. In the final Russia beat Italy 7–1.

In the new 2021 season, Russia played their first international matches at the 2021 Euro Beach Soccer League, defeating Turkey, Belarus and Spain in the 1st Stage. As host of the 2021 FIFA Beach Soccer World Cup, Russia automatically qualified for this edition.

== Results and fixtures ==
Matches played within the last 12 months, as well as upcoming fixtures, are displayed.

Legend

Win Draw Lose Fixture

=== 2019 ===
| 9 May 2019 2019 WBG, Qualifier | Russia | 7–0 | Norway | Salou, Spain |
| 15:25 | Paporotnyi 2', 12'; Zemskov 16'; Krasheninnikov 17'; Novikov 18'; Bazhenov 19', 24' | Report(ru) |

| 10 May 2019 2019 WBG, Qualifier | Russia | 7–2 | Ukraine | Salou, Spain |
| 16:15 | Shishin 2', 6', 17', 21'; Paporotnyi (yellow card) 9' (goal) 31'; Romanov 14'; Krasheninnikov 17' | Report(ru) | 22' Nerush; 24' Voitok; (yellow card) 26' Medvid |

| 11 May 2019 2019 WBG, Qualifier | Switzerland | 3–4 | Russia | Salou, Spain |
| 11:00 | Bohrer 4'; Hodel 15' 31'; Büst 30' (pen.) | Report(ru) | 8', 12', 27' Zemskov; 13' Paporotnyi; (yellow card) 30' Chuzhkov |

| 12 May 2019 2019 WBG, Qualifier | Russia | 5–4 | Spain | Salou, Spain |
| 18:30 | Shkarin 8'; Makarov (yellow card) 15' (goal) 19' (pen.), 32' (pen.); Krasheninnikov (yellow card) 16' (yellow-red card) 21'; Shishin 16' 31'; Bazhenov (yellow card) 18'; Paporotnyi 19'; Novikov (yellow card) 30'; V. Kryshanov (yellow card) 36' | Report(ru) | 9', 15' (yellow card) 32' Medina; 15', 23' Llorenç; (yellow card) 18' Ardil Navarro; (red card) 19' Domingo |

| 25 June 2019 2019 EG, Group stage | Spain | 5–4 (a.e.t.) | Russia | Minsk, Belarus |
| 14:30 | Major (red card) 8'; Suarez 13', 22', 35'; Llorenç 29'; Cintas 30'; Medina (yellow card) 31'; Adrian (yellow card) 35' | Report 1 Report 2 | 14', 25', 30' Shishin; (yellow card) 31' N. Kryshanov; 32' Zemskov | Stadium: Olympic Sports Complex; Referee: Sofien Benchabane (France) |

| 26 June 2019 | Italy | 4–2 | Russia | Minsk, Belarus |
| 14:30 | Corosiniti 7'; Gori (yellow card) 15' (goal) 20', 34'; Carpita 29' di Palma (yellow card) 36' | Report 1 Report 2 | 14' (o.g.) del Mestre; 16' (red card) 32' Krasheninnikov; (yellow card) 30' Shkarin; (yellow card) 32' Paporotnyi | Stadium: Olympic Sports Complex; Referee: Sergio Felipe Gomes Soares (Portugal) |

| 26 June 2019 2019 EG, Group stage | Russia | 5–1 | Ukraine | Minsk, Belarus |
| 14:30 | V. Kryshanov 15' (pen.) (yellow card) 35'; Paporotnyi 17'; Zemskov 25'; Shishin 34'; Romanov 34' | Report 1 Report 2 | (yellow card) 13' Zavorotnyi; 27' Sydorenko | Stadium: Olympic Sports Complex; Referee: Ago Kärtmann (Estonia) |

| 28 June 2019 2019 EG, Classification | Belarus | 5–5 (a.e.t.) (2–3 p) | Russia | Minsk, Belarus |
| 15:30 | Ryabko 1'; Kanstantsinau 2'; Piatrouski 11'; Hapon 30'; Savich 32' | Report 1 Report 2 | N. Kryshanov 11'; Paporotnyi 15', 15' (pen.), 18'; Zemskov 34' | Stadium: Olympic Sports Complex; Referee: Vitalij Gomolko (Lithuania) |
| | Penalties |
| | Savich (penalty scored); Bokach (penalty missed); Chaikouski (penalty scored) | | (penalty scored) Krasheninnikov; (penalty scored) Paporotnyi; (penalty scored) Shishin |

| 29 June 2019 2019 EG, Classification | Italy | 4–3 | Russia | Minsk, Belarus |
| 14:30 | Palmacci 17'; Gori 25', 34'; Corosiniti 30' | Report 1 Report 2 | Zemskov 13'; N. Kryshanov 21'; Paporotnyi 25' | Stadium: Olympic Sports Complex; Referee: Vitalij Gomolko (Lithuania) |

| 5 July 2019 2019 EBSL, Division A | Russia | 3–3 (a.e.t.) (3–2 p) | Azerbaijan | Nazaré, Portugal |
| 14:30 | Fedorov 11'; Nikonorov 29'; Stepliani 36' | Report | 3' Allahguliyev; 21' Manafov; 31' Nazarov | Referee: Antonio Pereira (Portugal) |
| | Penalties |
| | Krasheninnikov (penalty scored); Paporotnyi (penalty scored); Nikonorov (penalty scored) | | (penalty scored) Zeynalov; (penalty scored) Allahguliyev; (penalty missed) Mammadov |

| 6 July 2019 2019 EBSL, Division A | Turkey | 2–5 | Russia | Nazaré, Portugal |
| 15:35 | Yeşilırmak 6'; Bağcı (yellow card) 10'; Keskin 18' | Report | 10' (pen.) Raskin; 10' Fedorov; 17' Zharikov; 21', 33' Nikonorov; (yellow card) 21' Novikov | Referee: Attila Balint (Romanian) |

| 7 July 2019 2019 EBSL, Division A | Russia | 1–2 | Spain | Nazaré, Portugal |
| 18:00 | Nikonorov 15' | Report | 4' Antonio Mayor; 22' Donna | Referee: Sergio Felipe Gomes Soares (Portugal) |

| 19 July 2019 2019 FIFA BSWC, Qualifier | Russia | 6–2 | Germany | Moscow, Russia |
| 19:30 | Chuzhkov 2'; Nikonorov 4', 15' (pen.), 31'; Romanov 22'; Paporotnyi 25' | Report | 11' Biermann; 34' Svenson | Stadium: Luzhniki Olympic Complex |

| 20 July 2019 2019 FIFA BSWC, Qualifier | Estonia | 2–7 | Russia | Moscow, Russia |
| 19:00 | Lepik 34'; Munskind 34' | Report | 2' N. Kryshanov; 2', 15' Zemskov; 5' Makarov; 6' Krasheninnikov; 7' Paporotnyi; 34' Shishin | Stadium: Luzhniki Olympic Complex; Referee: Matticoli Gionni (Italy) |

| 21 July 2019 2019 FIFA BSWC, Qualifier | Russia | 5–1 | Hungary | Moscow, Russia |
| 15:45 | Romanov 2', 7'; Chuzhkov 14'; Nikonorov 21'; Shishin 31' | Report | 22' Genczler; (red card) 27' Rutai | Stadium: Luzhniki Olympic Complex; Referee: Özcan Sultanoğlu (Turkey) |

| 23 July 2019 2019 FIFA BSWC, Qualifier | Russia | 8–0 | Moldova | Moscow, Russia |
| 20:00 | Paporotnyi 2'; Makarov 3'; Shishin 12'; Nikonorov 21', 28'; Zemskov 24', 26', 36' | Report | (yellow card) 19' Șchiopu | Stadium: Luzhniki Olympic Complex; Referee: Laurynas Aržuolaitis (Lithuania) |

| 24 July 2019 2019 FIFA BSWC, Qualifier | Switzerland | 3–9 | Russia | Moscow, Russia |
| 20:00 | Stankovic 14'; Ott (yellow card) 21'; Steinemann 27'; Jaeggy 33' | Report | 3', 14', 26' Makarov; 4' Krasheninnikov; 13', 26' Romanov; 16', 22' Paporotnyi; 20' Shishin | Stadium: Luzhniki Olympic Complex; Referee: Gionni Matticoli (Italy) |

| 25 July 2019 2019 FIFA BSWC, Qualifier | Russia | 6–0 | Azerbaijan | Moscow, Russia |
| 18:45 | Chuzhkov 3'; Romanov 5'; Shishin 6', 23'; N. Kryshanov 32' (pen.); Nikonorov 34' | Report | | Stadium: Luzhniki Olympic Complex; Referee: Sofien Benchabane (France) |

| 26 July 2019 2019 FIFA BSWC, Qualifier | Russia | 6–1 | Spain | Moscow, Russia |
| 20:00 | Chuzhkov 1'; Javi T. 8' (o.g.); Nikonorov 21'; V. Kryshanov 24'; Paporotnyi 24'; Krasheninnikov 28' | Report | 29' (o.g.) Shkarin | Stadium: Luzhniki Olympic Complex; Referee: Ago Kärtmann (Estonia) |

| 27 July 2019 2019 FIFA BSWC, Qualifier | Italy | 1–7 | Russia | Moscow, Russia |
| 18:30 | Gori 22'; Ramacciotti (yellow card) 31' | Report | 1' Krasheninnikov; 8' (o.g.) Ramacciotti; 12' Shkarin; 14' Chuzhkov; 18', 27' Zemskov; 21' Paporotnyi | Stadium: Luzhniki Olympic Complex; Referee: Raul Martin Gonzalez Frances (Spain) |

| 5 September 2019 2019 EBSL, Superfinal | Belarus | 4–4 (a.e.t.) (2–1 p) | Russia | Figueira da Foz, Portugal |
| 14:15 | Makarevich 1'; Piatrouski 5'; Samsonov 15'; Miranovich (yellow card) 26'; Savich 33'; Kanstantsinau (yellow card) 35' | Report(ru) | 4', 26' (pen.) Makarov; (yellow card) 17' Novikov; 24' Paporotnyi; 27' Zemskov; (yellow card) 33' Nikonorov | Stadium: Beach Sports Complex; Referee: Sergio Gomes Soares (Portugal) |
| | Penalties |
| | Savich (penalty scored); Samsonov (penalty missed); Chaikouski (penalty scored) | | (penalty scored) Shishin; (penalty missed) Paporotnyi; (penalty missed) Krasheninnikov |

| 6 September 2019 2019 EBSL, Superfinal | Spain | 6–7 | Russia | Figueira da Foz, Portugal |
| 16:55 | Eduard 3'; Chiki 7', 14', 20' (pen.); Llorenç 11'; Adrian 17' | Report(ru) | 4', 32' Paporotnyi; 10' Shishin; (yellow card) 20' Bazhenov; 21' Fedorov; (yellow card) 12' (goal) 25', 27', 31' Zemskov | Stadium: Beach Sports Complex; Referee: Eduards Borisevics (Latvia) |

| 7 September 2019 2019 EBSL, Superfinal | Russia | 5–1 | Switzerland | Figueira da Foz, Portugal |
| 14:15 | Fedorov 3', 35'; Nikonorov 17', 22', 27' | Report(ru) | 5' Schirinzi | Stadium: Beach Sports Complex; Referee: Sergio Gomes Soares (Portugal) |

| 11 October 2019 2019 AWBG | El Salvador | 2–4 | Russia | Doha, Qatar |
| 21:00 | Batres 5'; Henríquez 18' | Report(ru) | 2' Paporotnyi; 12', 25' Makarov; 27' Nikonorov | Stadium: Katara Beach; Referee: Shao Liang (China) |

| 12 October 2019 2019 AWBG | Russia | 5–3 | Uruguay | Doha, Qatar |
| 19:30 | Makarov (yellow card) 1' (goal) 5'; Shishin 5'; Paporotnyi 8', 12', 15' | Report(ru) | 5' Fernandez; 14' Acuña; 32' Costa | Stadium: Katara Beach |

| 14 October 2019 2019 AWBG | Russia | 6–5 (a.e.t.) | Japan | Doha, Qatar |
| 22:30 | Zemskov 6'; Krasheninnikov 7'; Zemskov (yellow card) 13'; Paporotnyi 14', 39'; Bazhenov 16'; Makarov 22' | Report(ru) | 1' Ginoza; 4' Yamauchi; 12', 19' (pen.) Okuyama; 34' Matsuo | Stadium: Katara Beach |

| 15 October 2019 2019 AWBG, Semifinal | Iran | 2–6 | Russia | Doha, Qatar |
| 17:30 | Masoumizadeh 21'; Mokhtari 23' (yellow card) 30' | Report(ru) | 5' Makarov; 8', 32' Zemskov; 12' Shishin; (yellow card) 30' (goal) 34' Novikov; 35' Nikonorov | Stadium: Katara Beach |

| 16 October 2019 2019 AWBG, Final | Russia | 3–9 | Brazil | Doha, Qatar |
| 20:30 | Paporotnyi 19'; Zemskov 20'; Makarov 36' (pen.) | Report(ru) | 8' Catarino; 8' Rodrigo; 17', 18', 19' Mauricinho; 24' Bokinha; 32' Filipe Silva; 36', 36' Lucão | Stadium: Katara Beach |

| 5 November 2019 2019 BSIC, Group stage | Egypt | 3–5 | Russia | Dubai, UAE |
| 18:45 | Moustafa 5'; Mohamed 8', 30' | Report | 7', 12' Raskin; 9' Novikov; 14' Pavlenko; 15' (pen.) Kryshanov | Referee: Ibrahim Al Raeesi (United Arab Emirates) |

| 6 November 2019 2019 BSIC, Group stage | Russia | 3–1 | Mexico | Dubai, UAE |
| 18:45 | Zharikov 8'; Nikonorov 19'; V. Kryshanov 30' | Report | 20' N. Martinez | Referee: Turki Al Salehi (Oman) |

| 7 November 2019 2019 BSIC, Group stage | Russia | 3–3 (a.e.t.) (4–5 p) | Iran | Dubai, UAE |
| 20:00 | Chuzhkov 2'; Raskin 20'; Nikonorov 35' | Report | 22' Akbari; 24' Mirshekari; 30' (o.g.) V. Kryshanov | Referee: Antonio Pereira (Portugal) |
| | Penalties |
| | V. Kryshanov (penalty scored); Nikonorov (penalty scored); Novikov (penalty scored); Fedorov (penalty scored); Zharikov (penalty missed) | | (penalty scored) Masoumizadeh; (penalty scored) Mokhtari; (penalty scored) Kiani; (penalty scored) Mirshekari; (penalty scored) Shirmohammadi |

| 8 November 2019 2019 BSIC, Semifinals | Spain | 4–2 | Russia | Dubai, UAE |
| 18:45 | Llorenç 10'; Adril 18'; Chiky 28'; Javi Torres 29' | Report | 19' Nikonorov; 27' Fedorov | Referee: Turki Al Salehi (Oman) |

| 9 November 2019 2019 BSIC, Third place play-off | Russia | 1–2 (a.e.t.) | United Arab Emirates | Dubai, UAE |
| 18:45 | Nikonorov 36' | Report(ru) | 6', 38' W. Beshr | Referee: Yuichi Hatano (Japan) |

| 22 November 2019 2019 FIFA World Cup, Group stage | Senegal | 7–8 | Russia | Luque, Paraguay |
| 16:15 | Diassy 5', 17', 29', 34' (pen.); Fall 15', 33'; Mendy 26' | Report | Thioune 1' (o.g.); Nikonorov 4', 34'; Zemskov 8', 31', 32'; Paporotnyi 23', 34' | Stadium: Los Pynandi Stadium; Attendance: 277; Referee: Gustavo Domínguez (Paraguay) |

| 24 November 2019 2019 FIFA World Cup, Group stage | Russia | 1–4 | United Arab Emirates | Luque, Paraguay |
| 16:15 | Paporotnyi 19' | Report | Al-Jasmi 2'; A. Mohammad 23'; Muntaser 32' (pen.); W. Beshr 33' | Stadium: Los Pynandi Stadium; Attendance: 368; Referee: Mariano Romo (Argentina) |

| 26 November 2019 2019 FIFA World Cup, Group stage | Russia | 5–3 | Belarus | Luque, Paraguay |
| 19:25 | Nikonorov 6', 16', 34'; Zemskov 14'; Shishin 36' | Report | Hapon 5'; Bryshtsel 7'; Kanstantsinau 10' | Stadium: Los Pynandi Stadium; Attendance: 1,163; Referee: Gionni Matticoli (Italy) |

| 28 November 2019 2019 FIFA World Cup, Quarterfinals | Brazil | 3–4 | Russia | Luque, Paraguay |
| 16:15 | Rodrigo 1', 13'; Mão 5' | Report | Zemskov 2'; Shishin 20'; Romanov 24', 31' | Stadium: Los Pynandi Stadium; Attendance: 1,401; Referee: Said Hachim (Madagascar) |

| 30 November 2019 2019 FIFA World Cup, Semifinals | Italy | 8–7 (a.e.t.) | Russia | Luque, Paraguay |
| 16:15 | Corosiniti 9'; Ramacciotti 10', 15', 27'; Gori 25', 25', 31'; Zurlo 37' (pen.) | Report | Novikov 4'; Makarov 14', 35'; Zemskov 22', 24'; Romanov 25', 31' | Stadium: Los Pynandi Stadium; Attendance: 579; Referee: Ebrahim Al-Mansory (United Arab Emirates) |

| 1 December 2019 2019 FIFA World Cup, Third place match | Russia | 5–4 | Japan | Luque, Paraguay |
| 16:15 | Zemskov 8', 23', 29'; Novikov 8'; Makarov 26' | Report | Akaguma 4', 8'; Ozu 12'; Oba 23' | Stadium: Los Pynandi Stadium; Attendance: 2,739; Referee: Juan Angeles (Dominican Republic) |

=== 2021 ===
| 17 June 2021 2021 EBSL, Division A | Turkey | 1–5 | Russia | Nazaré, Portugal |
| 20:30 | Keskin 14' | Report | Raskin 1'; Krasheninnikov 5', 36'; Nikonorov 19'; Zemskov 20' | Stadium: Estádio do Viveiro – Jordan Santos |

| 18 June 2021 2021 EBSL, Division A | Russia | 5–3 | Belarus | Nazaré, Portugal |
| 20:30 | Makarov 13', 16'; Zemskov 14', 31'; Kosharny 22' | Report | Kanstantsinaiu 16'; Ryabko 24' (pen.); Bokach 34' | Stadium: Estádio do Viveiro – Jordan Santos |

| 18 June 2021 2021 EBSL, Division A | Russia | 6–5 (a.e.t.) | Spain | Nazaré, Portugal |
| 20:30 | Zemskov 11'; Nikonorov 14'; Novikov 28', 33'; Makarov 34'; Romanov 38' | Report | Juanmi 1'; Gonsalez 7'; Ardil 8'; Medina 30'; Llorenç 34' | Stadium: Estádio do Viveiro – Jordan Santos |

| 14 August 2021 Friendly match | Russia | 5–4 | Oman | Moscow, Russia |
| | Zemskov; Fedorov; Nikonorov; Makarov | | Al Araimi | Stadium: Luzhniki Beach Soccer Stadium |

| 19 August 2021 2021 FIFA World Cup, GS Group A | Russia | 5–4 (a.e.t.) | United States | Moscow, Russia |
| 20:30 UTC+3 | Shkarin 17'; Nikonorov 12', 20'; Novikov 21'; Makarov 39' | Report (BSWW); Report (FIFA) | Perea 2', 32' (yellow card) 8'; Canale 15' (pen.), 25' | Stadium: Luzhniki Beach Soccer Stadium; Attendance: 2,321; Referee: Lucas Estevão (Brazil) |

| 21 August 2021 2021 FIFA World Cup, GS Group A | Russia | 4–4 (a.e.t.) (5–4 p) | Paraguay | Moscow, Russia |
| 20:30 UTC+3 | Makarov 1', 37'; Kosharnyi 18'; Nikonorov 21'; Romanov (yellow card) 24'; Shkarin (yellow card) 39' | Report (BSWW); Report (FIFA) | Rolon 7'; M. Medina 16'; Carballo 35'; N. Medina 37' (pen.); J. Benitez (yellow card) 38' | Stadium: Luzhniki Beach Soccer Stadium; Attendance: 2,500; Referee: Hany Farouk (Egypt) |
| | Penalties |
| | Fedorov (penalty scored); Romanov (penalty scored); Nikonorov (penalty scored); Makarov (penalty scored); Krasheninnikov (penalty scored) | | (penalty scored) Carballo; (penalty scored) Morán; (penalty missed) Ojeda; (penalty scored) M. Medina; (penalty scored) V. Benitez |

| 23 August 2021 2021 FIFA World Cup, GS Group A | Japan | 1–7 | Russia | Moscow, Russia |
| 20:30 UTC+3 | Akaguma 32' | Report (BSWW); Report (FIFA) | Ozu 1' (o.g.); Paporotnyi 3', 25', 27' (yellow card) 34'; Zemskov 8'; Chuzhkov 15'; Nikonorov 36' | Stadium: Luzhniki Beach Soccer Stadium; Attendance: 2,500; Referee: Micke Palomino (Peru) |

| 26 August 2021 2021 FIFA World Cup, Quarter-finals | Russia | 4–2 | Spain | Moscow, Russia |
| 20:30 | Zemskov (yellow card) 1' (yellow-red card) 33'; Kotenev 6'; Nikonorov 14'; Makarov (yellow card) 11' (yellow-red card) 22' (goal) 15'; Shishin (yellow card) 25'; Paporotnyi (yellow card) 21' (goal) 34' | Report (BSWW); Report (FIFA) | Chintas (yellow card) 1'; Eduard 20'; Antonio 22'; Llorenç (yellow card) 34' | Stadium: Luzhniki Beach Soccer Stadium; Attendance: 2,500; Referee: Mariano Romo (Argentina) |

| 28 August 2021 2021 FIFA World Cup, Semi-finals | Russia | 5–5 (a.e.t.) (5–4 p) | Switzerland | Moscow, Russia |
| 18:00 | Krasheninnikov 1'; Nikonorov 5', 34' (yellow card) 35'; Kotenev (yellow card) 4' (goal) 14'; Romanov (yellow card) 26' (red card) 29'; Shkarin 36' | Report (BSWW); Report (FIFA) | Ott 6' (yellow card) 30'; Hodel 18', 19', 30' (pen.); Stankovic (yellow card) 12' (goal) 22'; Micev (red card) 28' | Stadium: Luzhniki Beach Soccer Stadium; Attendance: 2,500; Referee: Ingilab Mammadov (Azerbaijan) |
| | Penalties |
| | Fedorov (penalty scored); Nikonorov (penalty scored); Shishin (penalty scored); Novikov (penalty scored); Krasheninnikov (penalty scored) | | (penalty scored) Borer; (penalty missed) Steinemann; (penalty scored) Spaccarotella; (penalty scored) Hodel; (penalty scored) Stankovic |

| 29 August 2021 2021 FIFA World Cup, Final | Russia | 5–2 | Japan | Moscow, Russia |
| 19:30 | Zemskov 4'; Krasheninnikov 13', 34'; Novikov 15'; Paporotnyi 19' | Report (BSWW); Report (FIFA) | Akaguma 13', 17' (pen.); Matsuo (yellow card) 16'; Oba (yellow card) 29' | Stadium: Luzhniki Beach Soccer Stadium; Referee: Suhaimi Mat Hassan (Malaysia) |

| 9 September 2021 2021 EBSL, Superfinal | Poland | 2–7 | Russia | Nazaré, Portugal |
| 18:00 | Brochocki 18'; Klawikowski 29' | Report | Nikonorov 1', 32'; Paporotnyi 4'; Parkhomenko 9', 10'; Makarov 16'; Zemskov 28' | Stadium: Estádio do Viveiro – Jordan Santos |

| 10 September 2021 2021 EBSL, Superfinal | Russia | 5–5 (a.e.t.) (2–4 p) | Belarus | Nazaré, Portugal |
| 17:00 | Zemskov 1'; Nikonorov 17', 31'; Paporotnyi 18'; Shkarin 24' | Report | Mahaletski 1'; Parkhomenko 5' (o.g.); Hardzetski 8'; Kanstantsinau 26'; Novikau 31' | Stadium: Estádio do Viveiro – Jordan Santos; Referee: Vitalij Gomolko (Lithuania) |
| | Penalties |
| | Fedorov (penalty missed); Paporotnyi (penalty scored); Novikov (penalty scored); Makarov (penalty missed) | | (penalty scored) Hardzetski; (penalty scored) Chaikouski; (penalty missed) Piatrouski; (penalty scored) Drozd; (penalty scored) Novikau |

| 11 September 2021 2021 EBSL, Superfinal | Russia | 5–6 | Spain | Nazaré, Portugal |
| 17:00 | Nikonorov 2', 27'; Kosharnyi 9'; Fedorov 16'; Shkarin 17' | Report | Chiky 1', 13', 26'; Arias 8', 22'; Eduard 20' | Stadium: Estádio do Viveiro – Jordan Santos; Referee: Saverio Bottalico (Italy) |

| 2 November 2021 2021 BSIC, Group stage | Russia | 7–6 (a.e.t.) | Japan | Dubai, United Arab Emirates |
| 18:45 UTC+4 | Nikonorov 2', 4' (pen.), 21', 32'; Paporotnyi 3'; Novikov (yellow card) 25' (goal) 34'; Romanov (yellow card) 31'; Zemskov (yellow card) 32'; Kotenev 37' | Report | Okuyama 4' (pen.), 22'; Yamauchi 16', 23' (pen.); Ozu 26', 35' | Stadium: Kite Beach |

| 3 November 2021 2021 BSIC, Group stage | Paraguay | 7–8 | Russia | Dubai, United Arab Emirates |
| 18:45 UTC+4 | Ruiz (yellow card) 5'; Escobar 7' (yellow card) 26'; Mendoza 10', 18', 34'; Rios (yellow card) 11'; Benitez 18'; Servian (yellow card) 26'; Centurion 26' (pen.); Medina 30' (yellow card) 34' | Report | Zemskov 1', 13', 26' (yellow card) 26'; Krasheninnikov 2'; Parkhomenko 3'; Kotenev 3'; Nikonorov 20' (pen.) (yellow card) 6' (red card) 28'; Paporotnyi 9' (yellow card) 27'; Romanov (yellow card) 11' | Stadium: Kite Beach |

| 4 November 2021 2021 BSIC, Group stage | Russia | 4–3 | Iran | Dubai, United Arab Emirates |
| 20:00 UTC+4 | Kosharnyi 11'; Shkarin 14'; Kotenev 24'; Krasheninnikov 24' | Report | Fartkhouni 3'; Baltork (yellow card) 20'; Farahabadi 33'; Ahmadzadeh 35' | Stadium: Kite Beach |

| 5 November 2021 2021 BSIC, Semifinals | Russia | 7–3 | Portugal | Dubai, United Arab Emirates |
| 16:45 UTC+4 | Kotenev 2'; Novikov (yellow card) 5' (red card) 23'; Zemskov 7', 20', 35'; Paporotnyi 15'; Kosharnyi 19', 28' | Report | Lourenço 14' (yellow card) 28'; Leo 14' (yellow card) 28'; Lopez 20'; Torres (yellow card) 29'; Von (yellow card) 29' | Stadium: Kite Beach |

| 6 November 2021 2021 BSIC, Final | Russia | 3–2 | Iran | Dubai, United Arab Emirates |
| 17:00 UTC+4 | Nikonorov 3', 14', 20' | Report | Hassanabad 24', 36' | Stadium: Kite Beach |

== Coaching staff ==
| Position | Name |
|---|---|
| Head coach | (Russia) Mikhail Likhachev |
| Assistant coach | (Russia) Ilya Leonov |
| Goalkeeping coach | (Russia) Andrey Bukhlitskiy |
| Physician | (Russia) Mingiyan Badmayev |
| Massagist | (Russia) Aleksandr Lelekov |
| Chef | (Russia) Sergey Shamray |
| Team manager | (Russia) Ilya Pisarev |
| Press officer | (Russia) Yulia Ivanova |
| Translator | (Russia) Anastasia Ryabova |
| Video analyst | (Russia) Oleg Rubtsov |

== Players ==
=== Current squad ===
The national squad for the 2019 FIFA Beach Soccer World Cup.

Coach: Mikhail Likhachev

Note: Flags indicate national team as defined under FIFA eligibility rules; some limited exceptions apply. Players may hold more than one non-FIFA nationality.

| No. | Pos. | Nation | Player |
|---|---|---|---|
| 1 | GK | RUS | Maxim Chuzhkov |
| 2 | DF | RUS | Andrei Novikov |
| 3 | FW | RUS | Kirill Romanov |
| 4 | FW | RUS | Aleksey Makarov |
| 5 | DF | RUS | Yuri Krasheninnikov |
| 6 | FW | RUS | Dmitry Shishin |

| No. | Pos. | Nation | Player |
|---|---|---|---|
| 7 | DF | RUS | Anton Shkarin (captain) |
| 8 | FW | RUS | Ostap Fedorov |
| 9 | FW | RUS | Boris Nikonorov |
| 10 | DF | RUS | Artur Paporotnyi |
| 11 | FW | RUS | Fedor Zemskov |
| 12 | GK | RUS | Pavel Bazhenov |

== Player records ==
=== Top goalscorers ===
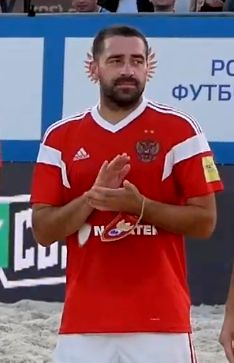
Dmitry Shishin is the topscorer for the Russian national team, having scored 235 goals in 232 caps.

As of 29 August 2021
*Players in bold are still active with Russia.

| Rank | Player | Goals | Caps | Average | Career |
|---|---|---|---|---|---|
| 1 | **Dmitry Shishin** | 235 | 232 | 1.01 | 2007– |
| 2 | **Aleksey Makarov** | 189 | 266 | 0.71 | 2007– |
| 3 | **Yuri Krasheninnikov** | 135 | 239 | 0.55 | 2009– |
| 4 | Egor Shaykov | 127 | 143 | 0.89 | 2005–2019 |
| 5 | Ilya Leonov | 114 | 205 | 0.56 | 2005–2017 |
| 6 | **Artur Paporotnyi** | 102 | 148 | 0.68 | 2011– |
| 7 | Egor Eremeev | 75 | 101 | 0.74 | 2008–2015 |
| 8 | **Fedor Zemskov** | 69 | 57 | 1.19 | 2018– |
| 9 | **Boris Nikonorov** | 69 | 77 | 0.86 | 2016– |
| 10 | **Anton Shkarin** | 66 | 287 | 0.23 | 2005– |
| 11 | **Kirill Romanov** | 61 | 155 | 0.39 | 2010– |
| 12 | Yuri Gorchinskyi | 60 | 169 | 0.36 | 2007–2017 |

== Records ==
=== Team record ===
==== Winning streak (22) ====
| No. | Date | Competition | Opponent team | Result |
|---|---|---|---|---|
| – | 31 July 2011 | Euro Beach Soccer League | Portugal | 3–5 |
| 1 | 4 August 2011 | Euro Beach Soccer League | Romania | 8–1 |
| 2 | 5 August 2011 | Euro Beach Soccer League | Spain | 4–2 |
| 3 | 7 August 2011 | Euro Beach Soccer League | Switzerland | 6–4 |
| 4 | 2 September 2011 | FIFA Beach Soccer World Cup | Nigeria | 8–4 |
| 5 | 4 September 2011 | FIFA Beach Soccer World Cup | Tahiti | 5–0 |
| 6 | 6 September 2011 | FIFA Beach Soccer World Cup | Venezuela | 7–3 |
| 7 | 8 September 2011 | FIFA Beach Soccer World Cup | Mexico | 5–3 |
| 8 | 10 September 2011 | FIFA Beach Soccer World Cup | El Salvador | 7–3 |
| 9 | 11 September 2011 | FIFA Beach Soccer World Cup | Brazil | 12–8 |
| 10 | 22 November 2011 | Beach Soccer Intercontinental Cup | Nigeria | 8–1 |
| 11 | 23 November 2011 | Beach Soccer Intercontinental Cup | Tahiti | 7–4 |
| 12 | 24 November 2011 | Beach Soccer Intercontinental Cup | United Arab Emirates | 7–0 |
| 13 | 25 November 2011 | Beach Soccer Intercontinental Cup | Switzerland | 4–4 (2–1) |
| 14 | 26 November 2011 | Beach Soccer Intercontinental Cup | Brazil | 5–4 aet |
| 15 | 8 June 2012 | Euro Beach Soccer League | France | 9–6 |
| 16 | 9 June 2012 | Euro Beach Soccer League | Spain | 6–2 |
| 17 | 10 June 2012 | Euro Beach Soccer League | Portugal | 1–0 |
| 18 | 3 August 2012 | Euro Beach Soccer League | France | 5–2 |
| 19 | 4 August 2012 | Euro Beach Soccer League | Italy | 3–2 |
| 20 | 5 August 2012 | Euro Beach Soccer League | Romania | 7–2 |
| 21 | 23 August 2012 | Euro Beach Soccer League | Italy | 7–3 |
| 22 | 25 August 2012 | Euro Beach Soccer League | Poland | 6–3 |
| – | 26 August 2012 | Euro Beach Soccer League | Switzerland | 5–6 |

== Competitive record ==
=== Beach Soccer World Championships ===
World Championships record
| Year | Round | Pos | Pld | W | W+ | L | GF | GA | GD |
|---|---|---|---|---|---|---|---|---|---|
| (Brazil) 1995 | did not enter | | | | | | | | |
| (Brazil) 1996 | Group stage | 5th | 3 | 1 | 0 | 2 | 8 | 10 | −2 |
| (Brazil) 1997 | did not enter | | | | | | | | |
| (Brazil) 1998 | did not enter | | | | | | | | |
| (Brazil) 1999 | did not enter | | | | | | | | |
| (Brazil) 2000 | did not enter | | | | | | | | |
| (Brazil) 2001 | did not enter | | | | | | | | |
| (Brazil) 2002 | did not enter | | | | | | | | |
| (Brazil) 2003 | did not enter | | | | | | | | |
| (Brazil) 2004 | did not enter | | | | | | | | |
| Total | 0 title | 1/10 | 3 | 1 | 0 | 2 | 8 | 10 | –2 |

=== FIFA Beach Soccer World Cup ===
| FIFA World Cup record | | | | | | | | | | Qualification (UEFA) record | | | | | | | | |
| Year | Round | Pos | Pld | W | W+ | L | GF | GA | GD | Round | Pos | Pld | W | W+ | L | GF | GA | GD |
|---|---|---|---|---|---|---|---|---|---|---|---|---|---|---|---|---|---|---|
| (Brazil) 2005 | did not qualify | | | | | | | | | No qualification matches | | | | | | | | |
| (Brazil) 2006 | Withdrew | | | | | | | | | No qualification matches | | | | | | | | |
| (Brazil) 2007 | Group stage | 9th | 3 | 1 | 0 | 2 | 9 | 6 | +3 | No qualification matches | | | | | | | | |
| (France) 2008 | Quarterfinal | 6th | 4 | 2 | 0 | 2 | 16 | 11 | +5 | Third Place | 3rd | 7 | 5 | 0 | 2 | 28 | 12 | +16 |
| (United Arab Emirates) 2009 | Quarterfinal | 7th | 4 | 2 | 0 | 2 | 13 | 9 | +4 | Runners-up | 2nd | 6 | 5 | 0 | 1 | 35 | 14 | +21 |
| (Italy) 2011 | **Champions** | **1st** | **6** | **6** | **0** | **0** | **44** | **21** | **+23** | Third place | 3rd | 7 | 5 | 0 | 2 | 54 | 21 | +33 |
| (French Polynesia) 2013 | **Champions** | **1st** | **6** | **5** | **1** | **0** | **29** | **15** | **+14** | Runners-up | 2nd | 8 | 6 | 0 | 2 | 43 | 27 | +16 |
| (Portugal) 2015 | **Third place** | **3rd** | **6** | **3** | **1** | **2** | **30** | **25** | **+5** | Champions | 1st | 7 | 7 | 0 | 0 | 28 | 13 | +15 |
| (The Bahamas) 2017 | did not qualify | | | | | | | | | Fifth place | 5th | 8 | 6 | 1 | 1 | 45 | 21 | +24 |
| (Paraguay) 2019 | **Third place** | **3rd** | **6** | **4** | **0** | **2** | **30** | **29** | **+1** | Champions | 1st | 8 | 8 | 0 | 0 | 51 | 9 | +42 |
| (Russia) 2021 | **Champions** | **1st** | **6** | **3** | **3** | **0** | **30** | **18** | **+12** | Automatically qualified as hosts | | | | | | | | |
| (United Arab Emirates) 2023 | Suspended | | | | | | | | | Suspended | | | | | | | | |
| (Seychelles) 2025 | Suspended | | | | | | | | | Suspended | | | | | | | | |
| Total | 3 titles | 8/11 | 35 | 22 | 5 | 10 | 171 | 105 | +62 | 2 titles | 7/9 | 51 | 42 | 1 | 8 | 284 | 117 | +167 |

=== Euro Beach Soccer League ===
EBSL record
| Year | Round | Pos | Pld | W | W+ | L | GF | GA | GD |
|---|---|---|---|---|---|---|---|---|---|
| 1998 | did not enter | | | | | | | | |
| 1999 | did not enter | | | | | | | | |
| 2000 | did not enter | | | | | | | | |
| 2001 | did not enter | | | | | | | | |
| 2002 | did not enter | | | | | | | | |
| 2003 | did not enter | | | | | | | | |
| 2004 | did not enter | | | | | | | | |
| 2005 | did not qualify | | | | | | | | |
| 2006 | did not enter | | | | | | | | |
| 2007 | **Third place** | **3rd** | **4** | **2** | **0** | **2** | **24** | **15** | **+9** |
| 2008 | **Third place** | **3rd** | **3** | **2** | **0** | **1** | **14** | **7** | **+7** |
| 2009 | **Champions** | **1st** | **3** | **3** | **1** | **0** | **10** | **8** | **+2** |
| 2010 | **Third place** | **3rd** | **3** | **2** | **0** | **1** | **15** | **11** | **+4** |
| 2011 | **Champions** | **1st** | **3** | **3** | **0** | **0** | **18** | **7** | **+11** |
| 2012 | **Runners-up** | **2nd** | **3** | **2** | **0** | **1** | **18** | **12** | **+6** |
| 2013 | **Champions** | **1st** | **4** | **3** | **0** | **1** | **22** | **15** | **+7** |
| 2014 | **Champions** | **1st** | **4** | **3** | **0** | **1** | **26** | **18** | **+8** |
| 2015 | **Third place** | **3rd** | **4** | **3** | **1** | **0** | **20** | **11** | **+9** |
| 2016 | **Third place** | **3rd** | **4** | **2** | **1** | **1** | **21** | **18** | **+3** |
| 2017 | **Champions** | **1st** | **4** | **4** | **0** | **0** | **15** | **7** | **+8** |
| 2018 | **Fourth place** | **4th** | **4** | **2** | **0** | **2** | **17** | **11** | **+6** |
| 2019 | **Runners-up** | **2nd** | **4** | **2** | **1** | **1** | **18** | **15** | **+3** |
| 2020 | Withdrew (Note: Russia withdrew due to travel restrictions imposed by the COVID-19 pandemic.) | | | | | | | | |
| 2021 | Fifth place | 5th | 4 | 2 | 0 | 2 | 29 | 17 | +12 |
| 2022 | Suspended (Note: Russia were suspended due to the Russian invasion of Ukraine.) | | | | | | | | |
| 2023 | Suspended | | | | | | | | |
| 2024 | Suspended | | | | | | | | |
| 2025 | Suspended | | | | | | | | |
| 2026 | Suspended | | | | | | | | |
| Total | 5 titles | 14/24 | 51 | 37 | 4 | 13 | 267 | 172 | +95 |

=== Euro Beach Soccer Cup ===
EBSC record
| Year | Round | Pos | Pld | W | W+ | L | GF | GA | GD |
|---|---|---|---|---|---|---|---|---|---|
| (Italy) 1998 | did not enter | | | | | | | | |
| (Spain) 1999 | did not enter | | | | | | | | |
| (Spain) 2001 | did not enter | | | | | | | | |
| (Spain) 2002 | did not enter | | | | | | | | |
| (Belgium) 2003 | did not enter | | | | | | | | |
| (Portugal) 2004 | did not enter | | | | | | | | |
| (Russia) 2005 | **Runners-up** | **2nd** | **3** | **2** | **0** | **1** | **10** | **8** | **+2** |
| (Italy) 2006 | did not enter | | | | | | | | |
| (Spain) 2007 | did not enter | | | | | | | | |
| (Azerbaijan) 2008 | did not enter | | | | | | | | |
| (Italy) 2009 | Fifth place | 5th | 3 | 2 | 0 | 1 | 17 | 8 | +9 |
| (Italy) 2010 | **Champions** | **1st** | **3** | **3** | **0** | **0** | **21** | **11** | **+10** |
| (Russia) 2012 | **Champions** | **1st** | **3** | **3** | **0** | **0** | **13** | **4** | **+9** |
| (Azerbaijan) 2014 | **Third place** | **3rd** | **3** | **2** | **0** | **1** | **14** | **11** | **+3** |
| (Serbia) 2016 | **Third place** | **3rd** | **3** | **2** | **0** | **1** | **13** | **6** | **+7** |
| Total | 2 titles | 6/15 | 18 | 14 | 0 | 4 | 88 | 48 | +40 |

=== Beach Soccer Intercontinental Cup ===
BSIC record
| Year | Round | Pos | Pld | W | W+ | L | GF | GA | GD |
|---|---|---|---|---|---|---|---|---|---|
| (United Arab Emirates) 2011 | **Champions** | 1st | 5 | 3 | 2 | 0 | 31 | 13 | +18 |
| (United Arab Emirates) 2012 | **Champions** | 1st | 5 | 5 | 0 | 0 | 32 | 13 | +19 |
| (United Arab Emirates) 2013 | **Runners-up** | 2nd | 5 | 3 | 2 | 2 | 28 | 25 | +3 |
| (United Arab Emirates) 2014 | **Runners-up** | 2nd | 5 | 4 | 2 | 1 | 22 | 11 | +10 |
| (United Arab Emirates) 2015 | **Champions** | 1st | 5 | 4 | 0 | 1 | 23 | 11 | +11 |
| (United Arab Emirates) 2016 | **Third place** | 3rd | 5 | 3 | 0 | 2 | 26 | 22 | +4 |
| (United Arab Emirates) 2017 | **Fourth place** | 4th | 5 | 3 | 0 | 2 | 16 | 12 | +4 |
| (United Arab Emirates) 2018 | **Runners-up** | 2nd | 5 | 2 | 1 | 2 | 22 | 14 | +8 |
| (United Arab Emirates) 2019 | **Fourth place** | 4th | 5 | 2 | 0 | 3 | 14 | 13 | +1 |
| (United Arab Emirates) 2021 | **Champions** | 1st | 5 | 4 | 1 | 0 | 29 | 21 | +8 |
| (United Arab Emirates) 2022 | did not enter | | | | | | | | |
| Total | 4 titles | 10/10 | 50 | 35 | 8 | 13 | 243 | 155 | +88 |

=== World Beach Games ===
| World Beach Games record | | | | | | | | | | Qualification | | | | |
| Year | Round | Pos | Pld | W | W+ | L | GF | GA | GD | Round | Pos | Pld | W | L |
|---|---|---|---|---|---|---|---|---|---|---|---|---|---|---|
| (Qatar) 2019 | **Runners-up** | **2nd** | **5** | **3** | **1** | **1** | **24** | **21** | **+3** | **Champions** | **1st** | **4** | **4** | **0** |
| (Indonesia) 2023 | Suspended | | | | | | | | | Suspended | | | | |
| (Vietnam) 2027 | Suspended | | | | | | | | | Suspended | | | | |
| Total | 0 titles | 2 | 5 | 3 | 1 | 1 | 24 | 21 | +3 | 1 title | 1/3 | 4 | 4 | 0 |

=== European Games ===
European Games record
| Year | Round | Pos | Pld | W | W+ | L | GF | GA | GD |
|---|---|---|---|---|---|---|---|---|---|
| (Azerbaijan) 2015 | **Champions** | **1st** | **5** | **4** | **0** | **1** | **19** | **13** | **+6** |
| (Belarus) 2019 | Sixth place | 6th | 5 | 2 | 0 | 3 | 19 | 19 | 0 |
| (Poland) 2023 | Suspended | | | | | | | | |
| (Turkey) 2027 | Suspended | | | | | | | | |
| Total | 1 title | 2/4 | 10 | 6 | 0 | 4 | 38 | 32 | +6 |

== Head-to-head record ==
Team Russia won 271 (76%) out of 355 matches.

Only main international events are counted

| Team | First | Last | Record | Win % |
|---|---|---|---|---|
| Italy | 1996 | 2019 | 13–8 | 62% |
| Argentina | 1996 | 2015 | 2–2 | 50% |
| United States | 1996 | 2021 | 5–1 | 83% |
| Belgium | 2005 | 2005 | 1–0 | 100% |
| Portugal | 2005 | 2021 | 9–12 | 40% |
| Switzerland | 2005 | 2021 | 14–5 | 74% |
| Mexico | 2007 | 2019 | 3–1 | 75% |
| Solomon Islands | 2007 | 2007 | 1–0 | 100% |
| Brazil | 2007 | 2019 | 7–7 | 50% |
| Cameroon | 2008 | 2008 | 1–0 | 100% |
| United Arab Emirates | 2008 | 2019 | 3–3 | 50% |
| Poland | 2009 | 2021 | 8–2 | 80% |
| Spain | 2009 | 2021 | 18–8 | 69% |
| France | 2009 | 2018 | 10–1 | 91% |
| Costa Rica | 2009 | 2009 | 1–0 | 100% |
| Romania | 2010 | 2016 | 9–0 | 100% |
| Turkey | 2011 | 2021 | 4–0 | 100% |
| Nigeria | 2011 | 2012 | 3–0 | 100% |
| (French Polynesia) Tahiti | 2011 | 2018 | 7–1 | 88% |
| Venezuela | 2011 | 2011 | 1–0 | 100% |
| El Salvador | 2011 | 2019 | 2–0 | 100% |
| Germany | 2013 | 2019 | 7–0 | 100% |
| Belarus | 2013 | 2021 | 10–4 | 71% |
| Netherlands | 2013 | 2014 | 1–1 | 50% |
| Greece | 2013 | 2017 | 4–0 | 100% |
| Japan | 2013 | 2021 | 7–0 | 100% |
| Ivory Coast | 2013 | 2013 | 1–0 | 100% |
| Paraguay | 2013 | 2021 | 5–0 | 100% |
| Iran | 2013 | 2021 | 7–7 | 50% |
| Hungary | 2014 | 2019 | 4–0 | 100% |
| Madagascar | 2015 | 2015 | 1–0 | 100% |
| Egypt | 2015 | 2019 | 3–0 | 100% |
| Ukraine | 2016 | 2019 | 5–0 | 100% |
| Kazakhstan | 2016 | 2016 | 1–0 | 100% |
| Norway | 2016 | 2019 | 2–0 | 100% |
| Moldova | 2016 | 2019 | 2–0 | 100% |
| Czech Republic | 2016 | 2016 | 1–0 | 100% |
| Azerbaijan | 2018 | 2019 | 3–0 | 100% |
| Estonia | 2019 | 2019 | 1–0 | 100% |
| Uruguay | 2019 | 2019 | 1–0 | 100% |
| Senegal | 2019 | 2019 | 1–0 | 100% |

== Honours ==
- **2007 Season**
  - EBSL Superfinal, Marseille, France: 3rd Place
  - EBSL Regular Phase Event, Tignes, France: Champions
  - EBSL Regular Phase Event, San Benedetto del Tronto, Italy: Champions
- **2008 Season**
  - ESBL Regular Phase Event, Tignes, France: Champions
  - 2008 FIFA Beach Soccer World Cup, Plage du Prado, France: 6th place
- **2009 Season**
  - Euro Beach Soccer League Superfinal winners
- **2010 Season**
  - Euro Beach Soccer Cup, Rome, Italy: champions
- **2011 Season**
  - 2011 Euro Beach Soccer League Superfinal winners
  - **2011 FIFA Beach Soccer World Cup, Marina di Ravenna, Italy: Champions**
  - 2011 Beach Soccer Intercontinental Cup, Dubai, United Arab Emirates: Champions
- **2012 Season**
  - 2012 Euro Beach Soccer Cup, Moscow: Champions
  - 2012 Euro Beach Soccer League Superfinal runners-up
  - 2012 Beach Soccer Intercontinental Cup, Dubai: Champions
- **2013 Season**
  - 2013 Euro Beach Soccer League Superfinal winners
  - **2013 FIFA Beach Soccer World Cup, Tahiti: Champions**
  - 2013 Beach Soccer Intercontinental Cup, Dubai: Runners-up
- **2014 Season**
  - 2014 Euro Beach Soccer Cup, Baku, Azerbaijan: 3rd place
  - 2014 Euro Beach Soccer League Superfinal winners
  - 2014 Beach Soccer Intercontinental Cup, Dubai: Runners-up
- **2015 Season**
  - 2015 European Games, Baku: Champions
  - 2015 FIFA Beach Soccer World Cup, Portugal: 3rd place
  - 2015 Euro Beach Soccer League Superfinal 3rd place
  - 2015 FIFA Beach Soccer World Cup qualification: Champions
  - 2015 Beach Soccer Intercontinental Cup, Dubai: Champions
- **2016 Season**
  - 2016 Euro Beach Soccer Cup, Belgrade: 3rd place
  - 2016 Euro Beach Soccer League Superfinal 3rd place
  - 2016 Beach Soccer Intercontinental Cup, Dubai: 3rd place
- **2017 Season**
  - 2017 BSWW Mundialito, Cascais: 3rd place
  - 2017 Euro Beach Soccer League Superfinal winners
- **2018 Season**
  - 2018 Beach Soccer Intercontinental Cup, Dubai: Runners-up
- **2019 Season**
  - 2019 World Beach Games: Runners-up
  - 2019 FIFA Beach Soccer World Cup qualification: Champions
  - 2019 Euro Beach Soccer League Superfinal runners-up
- **2020 Season**
  - Cancelled due to COVID-19 pandemic
- **2021 Season**
  - **2021 FIFA Beach Soccer World Cup, Moscow, Russia: Champions**
  - 2021 Beach Soccer Intercontinental Cup, Dubai: Champions

== See also ==
- Russia women's national beach soccer team
