= 2013 Beach Soccer Intercontinental Cup =

Tournament details
- Host country: United Arab Emirates
- Dates: 19–23 November 2013
- Teams: 8 (from 5 confederations)
- Venue(s): 1 (in 1 host city)

Final positions
- Champions: Iran (1st title)
- Runners-up: Russia
- Third place: United Arab Emirates
- Fourth place: Switzerland

Tournament statistics
- Matches played: 20
- Goals scored: 185 (9.25 per match)
- Top scorer(s): (Switzerland) Dejan Stankovic (17 goals)
- Best player(s): (Iran) Mohammad Ahmadzadeh
- Best goalkeeper: (Russia) Andrey Bukhlitskiy

The 2013 Beach Soccer Intercontinental Cup was the third edition of the tournament, Beach Soccer Intercontinental Cup. It took place at Jumeirah Beach in Dubai, United Arab Emirates from 19 to 23 November 2013. Eight teams participated in the competition.

== Participating teams ==
Team	Confederation	Achievements	Participation
United Arab Emirates	AFC	Host	3rd
Russia	UEFA	2013 FIFA Beach Soccer World Cup winners	3rd
Mexico	CONCACAF	2013 FIFA Beach Soccer WCQ (CONCACAF) third place	2nd
Brazil	CONMEBOL	2013 FIFA Beach Soccer World Cup third place	3rd
Iran	AFC	2013 FIFA Beach Soccer WCQ (AFC) winners	1st
Morocco	CAF	2013 FIFA Beach Soccer WCQ (CAF) third place	1st
Switzerland	UEFA	2013 Euro Beach Soccer League third place	3rd
Italy	UEFA	2013 Euro Beach Soccer League sixth place	1st

== Rule change ==
There was a new rule change made known during this tournament. It was made known that if a match goes to penalties after extra time, it is no longer sudden-death. It is now the best of three penalty kicks per side. It is only sudden death if each side is level after the three PK rounds.

This rule change was instituted after the completion of the 2013 Mundialito de Clubes tournament and will apparently be permanent for all BSWW-sanctioned tournaments.

== Group stage ==
The draw to divide the eight teams into two groups of four was conducted on 10 October 2013. The subsequent schedule was released on 29 October 2013.

All matches are listed as local time in Dubai, (UTC+4).

Legend
Teams that advanced to the semi finals

=== Group A ===
Team	Pld	W	W+	L	GF	GA	+/-	Pts
Switzerland	3	2	1	0	20	15	+5	8
United Arab Emirates	3	2	0	1	9	8	+1	6
Mexico	3	1	0	2	11	11	0	3
Morocco	3	0	0	3	11	17	–6	0

19 November 2013
16:45

Switzerland	6 – 5 (a.e.t.)	Mexico
S. Spacarotella 8'; D. Stankovic 16'; S. Leu 18' (pen.), 34'; P. Borer 22'; N. Ott 38'	Report 1 Report 2	4', 20' E. Marin; 6' A. Villa; 7' (o.g.) S. Spaccarotella; 9' F. Cati

Jumeirah Beach, Dubai

19 November 2013
20:30

United Arab Emirates	3 – 2	Morocco
H. Alhammadi 14', 24'; Karim Albalooshi 28'	Report 1 Report 2	27' M. Boujad; 34' A. Moufakir

Jumeirah Beach, Dubai

20 November 2013
16:45

Morocco	7 – 9	Switzerland
N. El Hadoui 7'; B. Esaadi 8' 29'; N. Boulakouaba 8', 26'; A. El Hadoui 28'; K. Mahboub 30'	Report 1 Report 2	2' P. Borer; 3', 8', 14', 23', 27', 32' D. Stankovic; 11' N. Ott; 19' V. Jaeggy

Jumeirah Beach, Dubai

20 November 2013
20:30

Mexico	1 – 3	United Arab Emirates
R. Villalobos 10'	Report 1 Report 2	1' Karim Albalooshi; 30' (pen.) H. A. Daryaei; 30' Kamal Albalooshi

Jumeirah Beach, Dubai

21 November 2013
18:30

Morocco	2 – 5	Mexico
A. El Hamidy 22'; A. Moukafir 30'	Report 1 Report 2	7', 17' A. Villa; 21', 36' H. Lopez; 26' M. Plata

Jumeirah Beach, Dubai

21 November 2013
20:30

United Arab Emirates	3 – 5	Switzerland
H. Alhammadi 1'; A. Beshir 12'; Kamal Albalooshi 25'	Report 1 Report 2	3', 11' D. Stankovic; 4' S. Meier; 5', 29' (pen.) N. Ott

Jumeirah Beach, Dubai

=== Group B ===
Team	Pld	W	W+	L	GF	GA	+/-	Pts
Iran	3	0	3	0	13	13	0	6
Russia	3	1	1	1	14	11	+3	5
Brazil	3	1	0	2	15	12	+3	3
Italy	3	0	0	3	12	18	–6	0

19 November 2013
18:00

Russia	2 – 2 (a.e.t.)	Iran
E. Shaykov 5'; Y. Krasheninnikov 39'	Report 1 Report 2	30' M. Mesigar; 37' M. Ahmadzadeh
Penalties
I. Leonov (penalty missed); Y. Krasheninnikov (penalty scored); D. Shishin (penalty scored)	2 – 3	(penalty scored) A. Naderi; (penalty scored) M. Hassani; (penalty scored) M. Ahmadzadeh

Jumeirah Beach, Dubai

19 November 2013
19:15

Italy	2 – 5	Brazil
G. Gori 10', 15'	Report 1 Report 2	15', 16', 27', 36' B. Xavier; 19' Cesinha

Jumeirah Beach, Dubai

20 November 2013
18:00

Iran	4 – 4 (a.e.t.)	Brazil
S. P. Hosseini 2'; F. Boloukbashi 11', 18'; M. Hassani 33'	Report 1 Report 2	2' Mauricinho; 10' Eudin; 26', 34' B. Xavier
Penalties
A. Naderi (penalty scored); M. Hassani (penalty scored); M. Ahmadzadeh (penalty scored)	3 – 1	(penalty scored) B. Xavier; (penalty missed) Eudin

Jumeirah Beach, Dubai

20 November 2013
19:15

Russia	6 – 3	Italy
A. Peremitin 5'; A. Makarov 17', 20'; E. Eremeev 18'; Y. Krasheninnikov 22'; D. Shishin 33'	Report 1 Report 2	28' (pen.) G. Gori; 29' P. Palmacci; 32' F. Corosiniti

Jumeirah Beach, Dubai

21 November 2013
16:45

Iran	7 – 7 (a.e.t.)	Italy
F. Boulokbashi 6', 8'; M. Hassani 8'; M. Mokhtari 21'; M. Mesigar 29', 31'; M. Ahmadzadeh 33'	Report 1 Report 2	5', 29' P. Palmacci; 6', 27' S. di Tullio; 7' (pen.), 34' A. Frainetti; 30' M. Leghissa
Penalties
F. Boulokbashi (penalty scored); A. Naderi (penalty scored); M. Hassani (penalty scored)	3 – 2	(penalty scored) F. Corosiniti; (penalty missed) M. Leghissa; (penalty scored) P. Palmacci

Jumeirah Beach, Dubai

21 November 2013
19:15

Brazil	6 – 6 (a.e.t.)	Russia
B. Xavier 16', 26', 36' (pen.); Datinha 29', 37'; Buru 30'	Report 1 Report 2	1' A. Shkarin; 16', 22' D. Shishin; 28', 39' A. Makarov; 35' A. Peremitin
Penalties
D. Catarino (penalty missed); Mauricinho (penalty scored)	1 – 3	(penalty scored) D. Shishin; (penalty scored) Y. Krasheninnikov; (penalty scored) A. Peremitin

Jumeirah Beach, Dubai

== Classification stage ==
5–8 places
22 November – Jumeirah Beach
Brazil	5
Morocco	3
22 November – Jumeirah Beach
Italy	5
Mexico	4

Fifth place
23 November – Jumeirah Beach
Brazil (a.e.t.)	7
Italy	5
Seventh place
23 November – Jumeirah Beach
Morocco	2
Mexico	3

=== 5–8 places ===
22 November 2013
16:45

Brazil	5 – 3	Morocco
Mauricinho 10', 16'; Datinha 11'; Sidney 17'; D. Catarino 36'	Report 1 Report 2	29' N. Boulakouaba; 31' A. El Hamidy; 36' N. El Hadoui

Jumeirah Beach, Dubai

22 November 2013
18:00

Italy	5 – 4	Mexico
P. Palmacci 12', 18', 36'; M. Leghissa 26', 34'	Report 1 Report 2	8', 36' (pen.) E. Marin; 26', 30' M. Plata

Jumeirah Beach, Dubai

=== Seventh place match ===
23 November 2013
16:45

Morocco	2 – 3	Mexico
N. Boulakouaba 3' (pen.); A. El Hadaoui 18'	Report 1 Report 2	9', 18' A. Villa; 30' F. Cati

Jumeirah Beach, Dubai

=== Fifth place match ===
23 November 2013
18:00

Brazil	7 – 5 (a.e.t.)	Italy
B. Xavier 1', 38'; Eudin 9', 35'; Mauricinho 23', 37'; Sidney 35'	Report 1 Report 2	16', 25', 29' P. Palmacci; 32' S. Marinai; 34' A. Frainetti

Jumeirah Beach, Dubai

== Championship stage ==
Semi-finals
22 November – Jumeirah Beach
Iran	2
United Arab Emirates	1
22 November – Jumeirah Beach
Switzerland	10
Russia (a.e.t.)	11

Final
23 November – Jumeirah Beach
Iran	4
Russia	3
Third place
23 November – Jumeirah Beach
United Arab Emirates	8
Switzerland	7

=== Semi-finals ===
22 November 2013
19:15

Iran	2 – 1	United Arab Emirates
M. Ahmadzadeh 30'; M. Mokhtari 31'	Report 1 Report 2	30' A. Ranjbar

Jumeirah Beach, Dubai

22 November 2013
20:30

Switzerland	10 – 11 (a.e.t.)	Russia
D. Stankovic 8', 11', 24', 30', 30', 39'; M. Jaeggy 16' (pen.), 21', 35'; P. Borer 34'	Report 1 Report 2	5', 12', 17', 27', 39' A. Peremitin; 6', 34' E. Shaykov; 7' D. Shishin; 18' E. Eremeev; 31', 39' Y. Krasheninnikov

Jumeirah Beach, Dubai

=== Third place ===
23 November 2013
19:15

United Arab Emirates	8 – 7	Switzerland
Kamal Albalooshi 15'; H. Alhammadi 26' (pen.), 27', 33', 33'; R Al Mesaabi 27', 33'; Karim Albalooshi 36'	Report 1 Report 2	6', 7', 16' (pen.) N. Ott; 27', 28' D. Stankovic; 28' M. Misev; 30' P. Borer

Jumeirah Beach, Dubai

=== Final ===
23 November 2013
20:30

Iran	4 – 3	Russia
M. Ahmadzadeh 1', 25'; M. Kiani 22'; A. Naderi 25'	Report 1 Report 2	8' A. Peremitin; 24' D. Shishin; 30' (o.g.) M. Kiani

Jumeirah Beach, Dubai

== Awards ==
Best Player (MVP)
(Iran) Mohammad Ahmadzadeh
Top Scorer
(Switzerland) Dejan Stankovic
17 goals
Best Goalkeeper
(Russia) Andrei Bukhlitskiy

== Top scorers ==
Rank	Player	Goals
1	(Switzerland) Dejan Stankovic	17
2	(Brazil) Bruno Xavier	11
3	(Italy) Paolo Palmacci	9
4	(Russia) Anatoly Peremitin	8
5	(Switzerland) Noel Ott	7

== Final standings ==
Rank	Team
1	Iran
2	Russia
3	United Arab Emirates
4	Switzerland
5	Brazil
6	Italy
7	Mexico
8	Morocco
