= Boris Nikonorov (beach soccer) =

Russian beach soccer player

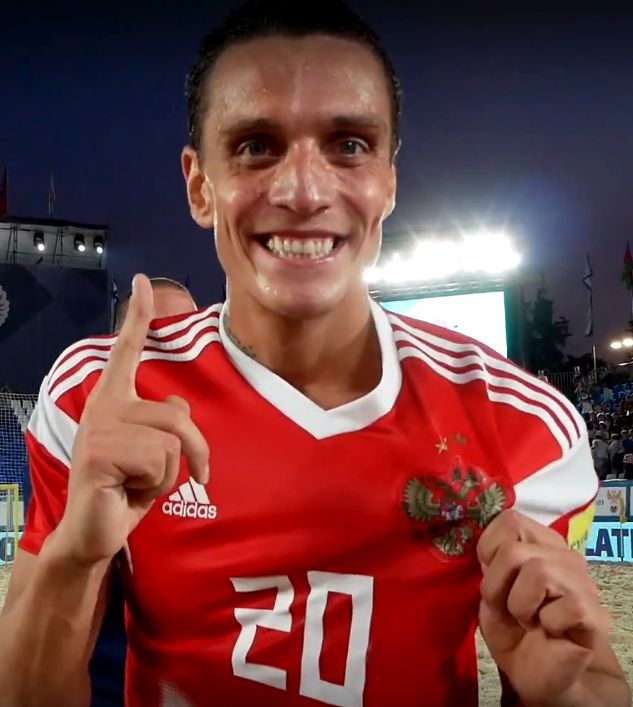

Personal information
- Full name: Boris Viktorovich Nikonorov
- Date of birth: 3 April 1989 (age 37)
- Place of birth: Yaroslavl, Soviet Union
- Position: Forward

Team information
- Current team: Lokomotiv Moscow

Senior career*
Years	Team	Apps	(Gls)
2012–2014	Podvodnik (beach soccer)	39	(32)
2015	Joker (beach soccer)	14	(8)
2016	Zolotoy (beach soccer)	40	(58)
2016	Nevskiye Berega (beach soccer)	3	(6)
2017	Petrogradets (beach soccer)	2	(6)
2017–	Lokomotiv Moscow	118	(186)
2018	Alliance (beach soccer)	6	(23)
2019	Napoli Patron (beach soccer)	2	(4)

International career^{‡}
2016–	Russia national beach soccer team	75	(63)
- * Club domestic league appearances and goals as of 20:31, 13 July 2021 (UTC) ‡ National team caps and goals as of 20:31, 13 July 2021 (UTC)

Boris Viktorovich Nikonorov (Russian: Борис Викторович Никоноров; born 3 April 1989) is a Russian beach soccer player. He is the all-time leader by number of goals for Lokomotiv Moscow, where he plays since 2017.

== Achievements ==
=== National team ===
- FIFA Beach Soccer World Cup champion: 2021
- Euro Beach Soccer League champion: 2017

=== Clubs ===
- Russian National champion: 2017
- Mundialito de Clubes champion: 2017

=== Individually ===
- 2017 BSWW Rising Star
