= 2019 Beach Soccer Intercontinental Cup =

Tournament details
- Host country: United Arab Emirates
- City: Dubai
- Dates: 5–9 November
- Teams: 8 (from 4 confederations)
- Venue: 1 (in 1 host city)

Final positions
- Champions: Iran (3rd title)
- Runners-up: Spain
- Third place: United Arab Emirates
- Fourth place: Russia

Tournament statistics
- Matches played: 20
- Goals scored: 138 (6.9 per match)
- Top scorer: (Iran) Amir Hossein Akbari (6 goals)
- Best player: (United Arab Emirates) Waleed Beshr
- Best goalkeeper: (United Arab Emirates) Mohamad Al Jasmi

The 2019 Beach Soccer Intercontinental Cup was the ninth edition of the Beach Soccer Intercontinental Cup, an annual international beach soccer tournament contested by men's national teams. Held in Dubai, United Arab Emirates since its inception, this year's event occurs between 5 and 9 November. The tournament was organised by the Dubai Sports Council (DSC) and Beach Soccer Worldwide (BSWW). Unlike in previous editions, there was no lead sponsor this year.

The Intercontinental Cup is typically seen as the biggest tournament in the current international beach soccer calendar after the FIFA Beach Soccer World Cup. Similar in nature to that of the FIFA Confederations Cup, eight nations took part.

The tournament started with a round robin group stage. The winners and runners-up from each group advanced to the knockout stage, a series of single-elimination matches, beginning with the semi-finals and ending with the final. Consolation matches were also played to determine other final rankings.

The season-ending Beach Soccer Stars awards were also presented in Dubai as a conclusion to the tournament.

Iran were the defending champions and successfully retained their title, winning a third Intercontinental Cup crown by beating Spain 6–3 in the final. Hosts UAE matched their best previous performance of third place for the first time since 2013.

== Participating teams ==
The following eight teams took part.

Overall, Europe and Asia were represented by three nations; Africa and North America, one nation each. Oceania, and for the first time, South America, did not enter any teams.

Team	Confederation	Recent achievements	Participation
United Arab Emirates	AFC	Hosts^{1}	9th
Iran	AFC	2018 Beach Soccer Intercontinental Cup winners	7th
Japan	AFC	2019 AFC Beach Soccer Championship winners	3rd
Egypt	CAF	2018 Africa Beach Soccer Cup of Nations third place	5th
Mexico	CONCACAF	2019 CONCACAF Beach Soccer Championship winners	5th
Russia	UEFA	2019 Euro Beach Soccer League runners-up	9th
Spain	UEFA	2019 Euro Beach Soccer League third place	2nd
Italy	UEFA	2019 Euro Beach Soccer League fourth place	2nd

1. Qualified as hosts, but also achieved a 2019 AFC Beach Soccer Championship runners-up finish

== Venue ==
The tournament took place in Dubai, United Arab Emirates; this edition was held at a purpose-built arena on Kite Beach, Jumeirah 3, for the second consecutive year with a capacity of 2,500.

== Sponsors ==
The following were the official sponsors of the tournament:

- Emirates
- Audi
- Al Nabooda Automobiles
- Huawei
- RAKBANK
- TikTok
- Aquafina
- Pocari Sweat
- Mycujoo
- Prozis

== Draw ==
The draw to split the eight teams into two groups of four took place on 9 October at the Dubai Sports Council headquarters at 11:00 GST (UTC+4) and was conducted by former Real Madrid defender, Míchel Salgado.

For the purposes of the draw, the nations were divided into two pots, shown in the table below; the teams were split based on their BSWW World Ranking – the top three teams plus the hosts were placed into Pot 1 whilst the lowest four teams of the ranking were placed in Pot 2. As each was drawn, the placement of the teams alternated back and forth between Groups A and B. The hosts, the United Arab Emirates, were automatically allocated to position A1.

The composition of the pots is shown below:

Pot 1	Pot 2
United Arab Emirates (13; hosts) (Note: Assigned to A1); Russia (3); Italy (4); Iran (5)	Spain (7); Mexico (10); Japan (12); Egypt (19)

Note: The numbers in parentheses show the world ranking of the teams at the time of the draw.

== Group stage ==
Matches are listed as local time in Dubai, GST (UTC+4)

=== Group A ===
Pos	Team	Pld	W	W+	WP	L	GF	GA	GD	Pts	Qualification
1	Spain	3	1	0	1	1	12	12	0	4	Knockout stage
2	United Arab Emirates (H)	3	0	1	1	1	9	7	+2	3	Knockout stage
3	Japan	3	1	0	0	2	9	8	+1	3	5th–8th place play-offs
4	Italy	3	1	0	0	2	16	19	−3	3	5th–8th place play-offs

Source: BSWW
(H) Host
5 November 2019
16:15

Japan	6–4	Italy
Okuyama 12', 33'; Oba 20'; Akaguma 25', 30'; Yamauchi 35'	Report(ru)	9', 33' Gori; 12' Zurlo; 35' Ramacciotti

Referee: Oezcan Sultanolu (Turkey)
5 November 2019
17:30

Spain	2–2 (a.e.t.)	United Arab Emirates
Chiky 11'; Javi Torres 33'	Report(ru)	18' A. Ali; 30' A. Bashr
Penalties
Chiky (penalty missed); Suarez (penalty scored); Llorenç (penalty scored)	2–1	(penalty missed) Almuntaser; (penalty scored) A. Ali; (penalty missed) W. Beshr

Referee: Vladimir Tashkov (Bulgaria)

6 November 2019
16:15

Japan	2–3	Spain
Matsuda 2'; Oba 36'	Report(ru)	11' Chiky; 26' Javi Torres; 31' Adril

Referee: Antonio Pereira (Portugal)
6 November 2019
17:30

United Arab Emirates	6–4 (a.e.t.)	Italy
A. Beshr 11', 38'; Walid 12'; Kamal 15'; A. Mohammadi 22', 39'	Report(ru)	17' Ramacciotti; 19' Giordani; 34', 34' Montani

Referee: Jurijs Ivusins (Latvia)

7 November 2019
16:15

Italy	8–7	Spain
Gori 6' (pen.), 8', 17'; Frainetti 13', 27' (pen.); Carpita 15'; Josep Jr. 16'; Ramacciotti 33'	Report(ru)	5', 15', 20' Suarez; 9', 21', 23' Cintas; 17' Frutos

Referee: Yuichi Hatano (Japan)
7 November 2019
18:45

United Arab Emirates	1–1 (a.e.t.)	Japan
Matsuda 36' (o.g.)	Report(ru)	26' (pen.) Oba
Penalties
A. Ali (penalty missed); Kamal (penalty scored); W. Beshr (penalty scored)	2–1	(penalty scored) Ozu; (penalty missed) Okuyama; (penalty missed) Oba

Referee: Oezcan Sultanolu (Turkey)

=== Group B ===
Pos	Team	Pld	W	W+	WP	L	GF	GA	GD	Pts	Qualification
1	Iran	3	2	0	1	0	15	10	+5	7	Knockout stage
2	Russia	3	2	0	0	1	11	7	+4	6	Knockout stage
3	Egypt	3	1	0	0	2	10	11	−1	3	5th–8th place play-offs
4	Mexico	3	0	0	0	3	6	14	−8	0	5th–8th place play-offs

Source: BSWW
5 November 2019
18:45

Egypt	3–5	Russia
Moustafa 5'; Mohamed 8', 30'	Report(ru)	7', 12' Raskin; 9' Novikov; 14' Pavlenko; 15' (pen.) Kryshanov

Referee: Ibrahim Al Raeesi (United Arab Emirates)
5 November 2019
20:00

Iran	7–4	Mexico
Ahmadzadeh 4', 36'; Mokhtari 8', 16'; Akbari 17', 30'; Masoumizadeh 35'	Report(ru)	6' Maldonado; 8', 29' Vizcarra; 36' Villaseñor

Referee: Yuichi Hatano (Japan)

6 November 2019
18:45

Russia	3–1	Mexico
Zharikov 8'; Nikonorov 19'; Kryshanov 30'	Report(ru)	20' N. Martinez

Referee: Turki Al Salehi (Oman)
6 November 2019
20:00

Iran	5–3	Egypt
Kiani 11'; A. Akbari 21', 27', 33'; Masoumizadeh 23'	Report(ru)	4' M. Samir; 20' A. Hassan; 27' M. Sasa

Referee: Ibrahim Al Raeesi (United Arab Emirates)

7 November 2019
17:30

Mexico	1–4	Egypt
Hassane 13' (o.g.)	Report(ru)	22' A. Elshahat; 26' Hassane; 28' Mostafa; 36' A. Hassan

Referee: Fallah Hassan Mohammed Al Balushi (Oman)
7 November 2019
20:00

Russia	3–3 (a.e.t.)	Iran
Chuzhkov 2'; Raskin 20'; Nikonorov 35'	Report(ru)	22' Akbari; 24' Mirshekari; 30' (o.g.) Kryshanov
Penalties
Kryshanov (penalty scored); Nikonorov (penalty scored); Novikov (penalty scored); Fedorov (penalty scored); Zharikov (penalty missed)	4–5	(penalty scored) Masoumizadeh; (penalty scored) Mokhtari; (penalty scored) Kiani; (penalty scored) Mirshekari; (penalty scored) Shirmohammadi

Referee: Antonio Pereira (Portugal)

== 5th–8th place play-offs ==
The teams finishing in third and fourth place are knocked out of title-winning contention, receding to play in consolation matches to determine 5th through 8th place in the final standings.

5th–8th place semi-finals
8 November
Egypt	4
Italy	3
8 November
Japan	5
Mexico	4

Fifth place play-off
9 November
Egypt	2
Japan	7
Seventh place play-off
9 November
Italy	3
Mexico	2

=== 5th–8th place semi-finals ===
8 November 2019
16:15

Egypt	4–3	Italy
Hosaniy 15'; A. Elshahat 19'; Mohamed 20'; A. Hassan 31'	Report(ru)	16' Josep Jr.; 30' Montani; 36' Palmacci

Referee: Yuichi Hatano (Japan)
8 November 2019
17:30

Japan	5–4	Mexico
Ozu 19', 24'; Matsuda 30'; Oba 31'; Matsuo 34'	Report(ru)	3', 16' N. Martinez; 13', 13' Maldonado

Referee: Antonio Pereira (Portugal)

=== Seventh place play-off ===
9 November 2019
16:15

Italy	3–2	Mexico
Giordani 9'; Zurlo 19', 35'	Report(ru)	20' N. Martinez; 21' Macias

Referee: Turki Al Salehi (Oman)

=== Fifth place play-off ===
9 November 2019
17:30

Egypt	2–7	Japan
Moustafa 22', 33'	Report(ru)	4' Ozu; 9' Yamauchi; 12' (pen.) Okuyama; 16' Komaki; 22' Matsuda; 34' Oba; 36' Matsuo

Referee: Jurijs Ivusins (Latvia)

== Knockout stage ==
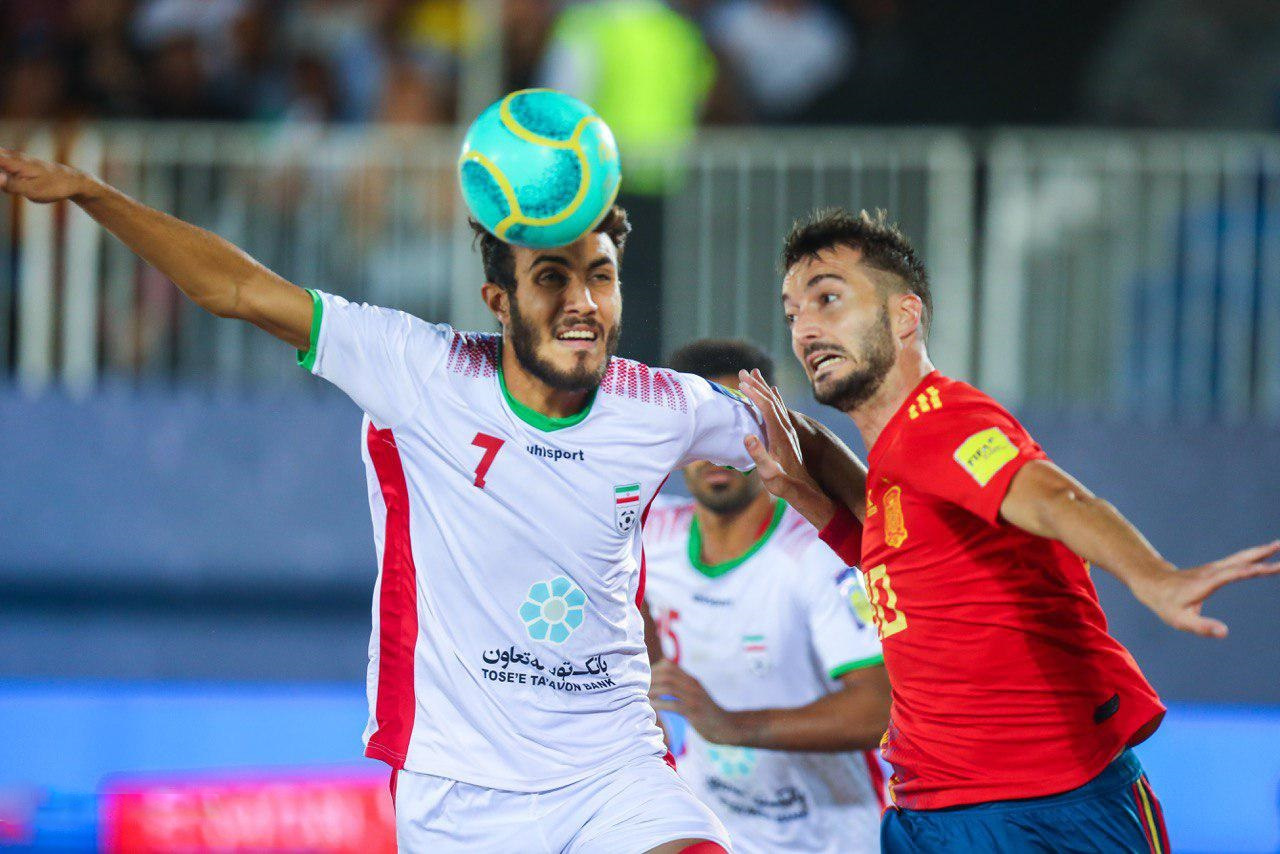
Llorenç (Spain) and Mirshekari (Iran), battling for the ball during the final

The group winners and runners-up progress to the knockout stage to continue to compete for the title.

Semi-finals
8 November
Spain	4
Russia	2
8 November
Iran (p)	1 (4)
United Arab Emirates	1 (3)

Final
9 November
Spain	3
Iran	6
Third place play-off
9 November
Russia	1
United Arab Emirates (a.e.t.)	2

=== Semi finals ===
8 November 2019
18:45

Spain	4–2	Russia
Llorenç 10'; Adril 18'; Chiky 28'; Javi Torres 29'	Report(ru)	19' Nikonorov; 27' Fedorov

Referee: Turki Al Salehi (Oman)
8 November 2019
20:00

Iran	1–1 (a.e.t.)	United Arab Emirates
Behzadpour 9'	Report(ru)	31' Walid
Penalties
Shirmohammadi (penalty missed); Mirshekari (penalty scored); Kiani (penalty scored); Piramoun (penalty scored); Masoumizadeh (penalty scored)	4–3	(penalty missed) Ali Karim; (penalty scored) Hasham; (penalty scored) W. Beshr; (penalty scored) A. Ali; (penalty missed) Kamal

Referee: Vladimir Tashkov (Bulgaria)

=== Third place play-off ===
9 November 2019
18:45

Russia	1–2 (a.e.t.)	United Arab Emirates
Nikonorov 36'	Report(ru)	6', 38' W. Beshr

Referee: Yuichi Hatano (Japan)

=== Final ===
9 November 2019
20:00

Spain	3–6	Iran
Llorenç 11'; Suarez 12'; Frutos 15' (pen.)	Report(ru)	3' Kiani; 6' Piramoun; 19' Mokhtari; 22' Behzadpour; 29' Ahmadzadeh; 33' Masoumizadeh

Referee: Antonio Pereira (Portugal)

== Awards ==
=== Winners trophy ===
2019 Beach Soccer Intercontinental Cup
champions

Iran
Third title

=== Individual awards ===
Top scorer
(Iran) Amir Akbari
6 goals
Best player
(United Arab Emirates) Waleed Beshr
Best goalkeeper
(United Arab Emirates) Mohamad Al Jasmi

== Statistics ==
=== Goalscorers ===
6 goals

- (Iran) Amir Akbari

5 goals

- (Italy) Gabriele Gori
- (Japan) Takaaki Oba

4 goals

- (Spain) Eduard Suarez
- (Mexico) Nestor Martinez
- (Russia) Boris Nikonorov

3 goals

- (Spain) Jose Cintas
- (Spain) Javi Torres
- (Spain) Salvador "Chiky" Ardil
- (Iran) Mohammadali Mokhtari
- (Iran) Mohammad Ahmadzadeh
- (Iran) Mohammad Masoumizadeh
- (Mexico) Ramon Maldonado
- (United Arab Emirates) Ahmed Beshr
- (Italy) Dario Ramacciotti
- (Italy) Emmanuele Zurlo
- (Italy) Marcello Percia Montani
- (Japan) Keisuke Matsuda
- (Japan) Ozu Moreira
- (Egypt) Abdelrahman Hassan
- (Egypt) Mohamed Abdelnaby
- (Egypt) Moustafa Shaaban
- (Russia) Vladimir Raskin
- (Japan) Masanori Okuyama

2 goals

- (Spain) Llorenç Gomez
- (Spain) David Adril
- (Iran) Mostafa Kiani
- (Iran) Hamid Behzadpour
- (United Arab Emirates) Waleed Beshr
- (United Arab Emirates) Ali Mohammadi
- (United Arab Emirates) Walid Mohammadi
- (Italy) Josep Junior
- (Italy) Marco Giordani
- (Japan) Naoya Matsuo
- (Japan) Shusei Yamauchi
- (Egypt) Ahmed Elshahat
- (Egypt) Mostafa Samir
- (Mexico) Jose Vizcarra
- (Spain) Adrian Frutos
- (Italy) Alessio Frainetti
- (Russia) Viktor Kryshanov

1 goal

- (Egypt) Elhusseini Taha Rashed
- (Iran) Ali Mirshekari
- (Iran) Saeid Piramoun
- (United Arab Emirates) Kamal Ali Sulaiman
- (United Arab Emirates) Abbas Ali
- (Italy) Andrea Carpita
- (Italy) Paolo Palmacci
- (Japan) Takuya Akaguma
- (Japan) Masayuki Komaki
- (Egypt) Moustafa Aly Mohamed
- (Egypt) Hassane Mohamed Hassane
- (Mexico) Diego Villasenor
- (Mexico) Daniel Macias
- (Russia) Maxim Chuzhkov
- (Russia) Andrey Novikov
- (Russia) Alexey Pavlenko
- (Russia) Ostap Fedorov
- (Russia) Vladislav Zharikov

Own goals

- (Japan) Keisuke Matsuda (vs. UAE)
- (Egypt) Hassane Mohamed Hassane (vs. Mexico)
- (Russia) Viktor Kryshanov (vs. Iran (group stage))

Source: BSRussia

=== Final standings ===
Pos	Grp	Team	Pld	W	W+	WP	L	GF	GA	GD	Pts	Final result
1	B	Iran	5	3	0	2	0	22	14	+8	11	Champions
2	A	Spain	5	2	0	1	2	19	20	−1	7	Runners-up
3	A	United Arab Emirates	5	0	2	1	2	12	9	+3	5	Third place
4	B	Russia	5	2	0	0	3	14	13	+1	6	
5	A	Japan	5	3	0	0	2	21	14	+7	9	Eliminated in Group stage
6	B	Egypt	5	2	0	0	3	16	21	−5	6	Eliminated in Group stage
7	A	Italy	5	2	0	0	3	22	25	−3	6	Eliminated in Group stage
8	B	Mexico	5	0	0	0	5	12	22	−10	0	Eliminated in Group stage

Source: BSWW
