= 2012 Beach Soccer Intercontinental Cup =

2012 Samsung Beach Soccer Intercontinental Cup
Tournament details
- Host country: United Arab Emirates
- Dates: 30 October – 3 November 2012
- Teams: 8 (from 6 confederations)
- Venue(s): 1 (in 1 host city)

Final positions
- Champions: Russia (2nd title)
- Runners-up: Brazil
- Third place: United Arab Emirates
- Fourth place: Nigeria

Tournament statistics
- Matches played: 16
- Goals scored: 150 (9.38 per match)
- Top scorer(s): (Brazil) Fernando DDI (10 goals)
- Best player(s): (Russia) Egor Shaykov
- Best goalkeeper: (Russia) Andrey Bukhlitskiy

The 2012 Samsung Beach Soccer Intercontinental Cup was the second edition of the new tournament, following the success of the initial Beach Soccer Intercontinental Cup. It took place at a temporary stadium at Dubai Festival City in Dubai, United Arab Emirates from 30 October to 3 November 2012. Eight teams participated in the competition. The stadium had a capacity of 2,500 spectators.

== Participating teams ==
Team	Confederation	Achievements	Participation
United Arab Emirates	AFC	Host	2nd
Russia	UEFA	2011 FIFA Beach Soccer World Cup winners	2nd
Japan	AFC	2011 FIFA Beach Soccer WCQ (AFC) winners	1st
Brazil	CONMEBOL	2011 FIFA Beach Soccer WCQ (CONMEBOL) winners	2nd
United States	CONCACAF	2011 FIFA Beach Soccer WCQ (CONCACAF) third place	1st
Nigeria	CAF	2011 FIFA Beach Soccer WCQ (CAF) runners-up	2nd
Switzerland	UEFA	2012 Euro Beach Soccer League winners	2nd
Tahiti	OFC	2011 FIFA Beach Soccer WCQ (OFC) winners	2nd

== Draw and schedule ==
The draw to divide the eight teams into two groups of four was conducted on 9 October 2012. The subsequent schedule was determined on 11 October 2012.

== Group stage ==
All matches are listed as local time in Dubai, (UTC+4)

Legend
Teams that advanced to the semi finals

=== Group A ===
Team	Pld	W	W+	L	GF	GA	+/-	Pts
Russia	3	3	0	0	16	5	+11	9
United Arab Emirates	3	2	0	1	10	8	+2	6
Tahiti	3	1	0	2	8	10	-2	3
United States	3	0	0	3	7	18	-11	0

30 October 2012
18:00

Russia	9 - 1	United States
E. Shaykov 1'; E. Eremeev 9', 19', 26'; D. Ippolitov 11'; D. Shishin 21'. 30'; Y. Krasheninnikov 30', 36'	Report	5' O. Gil

Dubai Festival City, Dubai

30 October 2012
20:30

United Arab Emirates	3 - 2	Tahiti
Ali Karim 8'; R. al Mesaabi 29'; A. Ali Rahi 35'	Report	1' T. Zaveroni; 20' R. L. F. Kuee

Dubai Festival City, Dubai

31 October 2012
18:00

Russia	4 - 2	Tahiti
I. Leonov 2'; D. Shishin 3', 6'; D. Ippolitov 4'	Report	2' N. Bennett; 14' H. Taiarui

Dubai Festival City, Dubai

31 October 2012
20:30

United States	3 - 5	United Arab Emirates
N. Pereira 4', 34'; E. Meister 10'	Report	6' A. Ali Rahi; 11' (pen.) M. Abbas; 30' Ali Karim; 31' R. Ahmad; 34' Hassan Ali

Dubai Festival City, Dubai

1 November 2012
18:00

Tahiti	4 - 3	United States
N. Bennett 11', 34'; R. L. F. Kuee 17'; T. Zaveroni 28'	Report	14', 20' (pen.) A. Feld; 34' (pen.) O. Reyes

Dubai Festival City, Dubai

1 November 2012
20:30

United Arab Emirates	2 - 3	Russia
Hassan Ali 17'; K. Ali Sulaiman 19'	Report	6' Y. Gorchinskiy; 19' (o.g.) K. Ali Sulaiman; 34' E. Eremeev

Dubai Festival City, Dubai

=== Group B ===
Team	Pld	W	W+	L	GF	GA	+/-	Pts
Brazil	3	3	0	0	16	11	+5	9
Nigeria	3	2	0	1	16	17	-1	6
Switzerland	3	1	0	2	16	15	+1	3
Japan	3	0	0	3	14	19	-5	0

30 October 2012
16:45

Japan	4 - 7	Switzerland
S. Yamauchi 2'; M. Komaki 5'; A. Kazumasa 12'; S. Makino 24'	Report	5' P. Borer; 8', 14', 21', 36' D. Stankovic; 32', 33' M. Jaeggy

Dubai Festival City, Dubai

30 October 2012
19:15

Brazil	6 - 3	Nigeria
Datinha 10'; Mao 12'; Benjamin 20'; Fernando DDI 28', 28', 29'	Report	10' O. Okemmiri; 19' V. Tale; 25' B. Ibenegbu

Dubai Festival City, Dubai

31 October 2012
16:45

Nigeria	7 - 6	Switzerland
B. Ibenegbu 1', 31'; V. Tale 4', 8', 33'; O. Okemmiri 10'; A. Abu 36'	Report	7' S. Lutz; 8' S. Spaccarotella; 14' S. Meier; 26', 28', 32' D. Stankovic

Dubai Festival City, Dubai

31 October 2012
19:15

Brazil	6 - 5	Japan
André 8', 9'; Jorginho 17'; Mao 17'; Anderson 20'; Gil 25'	Report	6' M. Komaki; 10' A. Kazumasa; 16', 20' S. Yamauchi; 34' S. Suzuki

Dubai Festival City, Dubai

1 November 2012
16:45

Nigeria	6 - 5	Japan
B. Ibenegbu 2', 3', 4', 17'; A. Abu 17', 26'	Report	2', 2', 17' A.Kazumasa; 26' H. Oda; 33' M. Komaki

Dubai Festival City, Dubai

1 November 2012
19:15

Switzerland	3 - 4	Brazil
V. Jaeggy 4'; S Meier 23'; D. Stankovic 32'	Report	21', 36' Fernando DDI; 34' Bruno Malias; 35' Benjamin

Dubai Festival City, Dubai

== Knockout stage ==
Semi-finals
2 November - Dubai Festival City
Russia	9
Nigeria	4
2 November - Dubai Festival City
Brazil	5
United Arab Emirates	3

Final
3 November - Dubai Festival City
Russia	7
Brazil	4
Third place
3 November - Dubai Festival City
Nigeria	7
United Arab Emirates (a.e.t)	8

=== Semi-finals ===
2 November 2012
19:15

Russia	9 - 4	Nigeria
D. Ippolitov 1'; E. Shaykov 3', 21', 25', 32'; D. Shishin 5'; E. Eremeev 11', 29'; I. Leonov 16'	Report	7', 33' B. Ibenegbu; 22' A. Abu; 36' V. Tale

Dubai Festival City, Dubai

2 November 2012
20:30

Brazil	5 - 3	United Arab Emirates
Gil 1'; Fernando DDI 10', 21', 34'; Bruno Malias 14'	Report	23' (o.g.) Sidney; 26' (pen.) R. Ahmad; 34' (pen.) Ali Karim

Dubai Festival City, Dubai

=== Third place play off ===
3 November 2012
19:15

Nigeria	7 - 8 (a.e.t.)	United Arab Emirates
I. Olawale 5', 17', 18', 22'; S. Maijama'a 21'; R. Al Mesaabi 25' (o.g.); A. Abu 35'	Report	2', 14', 19' R. Ahmad; 24' Hassan Ali; 26' Ali Karim; 29', 37' R. Al Mesaabi; 31' A. Al Rahi

Dubai Festival City, Dubai

=== Final ===
3 November 2012
20:30

Russia	7 - 4	Brazil
A. Makarov 5', 28'; E. Shaykov 9', 12', 15', 21' (pen.); D. Shishin 23'	Report	22', 28' Fernando DDI; 31' Bruno Malias; 36' (pen.) André

Dubai Festival City, Dubai

== Awards ==
Best Player (MVP)
(Russia) Egor Shaykov
Top Scorer
(Brazil) Fernando DDI
10 goals
Best Goalkeeper
(Russia) Andrei Buklitskiy

== Final standings ==
Rank	Team
1	Russia
2	Brazil
3	United Arab Emirates
4	Nigeria
5	Switzerland
6	Tahiti
7	Japan
8	United States
