= 2015 Beach Soccer Intercontinental Cup =

Tournament details
- Host country: United Arab Emirates
- Dates: 3–7 November 2015
- Teams: 8 (from 6 confederations)
- Venue: 1 (in 1 host city)

Final positions
- Champions: Russia (3rd title)
- Runners-up: Tahiti
- Third place: Iran
- Fourth place: Egypt

Tournament statistics
- Matches played: 20
- Goals scored: 145 (7.25 per match)
- Top scorer: (Egypt) Mohamed Gamal (9 goals)
- Best player: (Russia) Yury Krasheninnikov
- Best goalkeeper: (United Arab Emirates) Humaid Albalooshi

The 2015 Beach Soccer Intercontinental Cup was the fifth edition of the tournament, Beach Soccer Intercontinental Cup. It took place at Jumeirah Beach in Dubai, United Arab Emirates from 3 to 7 November 2015. Eight teams participated in the competition.

== Participating teams ==
| Team | Confederation | Achievements | Participation |
|---|---|---|---|
| United Arab Emirates | AFC | Host | 5th |
| Portugal | UEFA | 2015 FIFA Beach Soccer World Cup & 2015 Euro Beach Soccer League winners | 2nd |
| Russia | UEFA | 2015 Euro Beach Soccer League third place | 5th |
| Mexico | CONCACAF | 2015 CONCACAF Beach Soccer Championship winners | 3rd |
| Argentina | CONMEBOL | 2015 CONMEBOL Beach Soccer Championship third place | 1st |
| Iran | AFC | 2015 AFC Beach Soccer Championship third place | 3rd |
| Egypt | CAF | 2015 CAF Beach Soccer Championship sixth place | 1st |
| Tahiti | OFC | 2015 FIFA Beach Soccer World Cup runners-up | 3rd |

== Group stage ==
All matches are listed as local time in Dubai, (UTC+4).

Legend
Teams that advanced to the semi-finals

=== Group A ===
| Team | Pld | W | W+ | L | GF | GA | +/- | Pts |
|---|---|---|---|---|---|---|---|---|
| Russia | 3 | 2 | 0 | 1 | 14 | 8 | +6 | 6 |
| Egypt | 3 | 2 | 0 | 1 | 12 | 13 | –1 | 6 |
| United Arab Emirates | 3 | 1 | 1 | 1 | 10 | 10 | 0 | 4 |
| Argentina | 3 | 0 | 0 | 3 | 10 | 15 | –5 | 0 |

3 November 2015
17:30

| United Arab Emirates | 2–3 | Egypt |
|---|---|---|
| Ali Karim 13'; Walid 31' | Report | Aboserie 12'; Gamal 35', 36' |

Jumeirah Beach, Dubai

3 November 2015
18:45

| Russia | 5–1 | Argentina |
|---|---|---|
| Makarov 1'; Shishin 9'; Krasheninnikov 24'; Gorchinsky 35'; Paporotnyi 36' | Report | Minici 25' |

Jumeirah Beach, Dubai

4 November 2015
17:30

| Argentina | 3–3 (a.e.t.) | United Arab Emirates |
|---|---|---|
| | Report |
Penalties
| | 4–5 |

Jumeirah Beach, Dubai

4 November 2015
18:45

| Egypt | 2–5 | Russia |
|---|---|---|
| | Report |

Jumeirah Beach, Dubai

5 November 2015
16:15

| Egypt | 7–6 | Argentina |
|---|---|---|
| | Report |

Jumeirah Beach, Dubai

5 November 2015
18:45

| United Arab Emirates | 5–4 | Russia |
|---|---|---|
| | Report |

Jumeirah Beach, Dubai

=== Group B ===
| Team | Pld | W | W+ | L | GF | GA | +/- | Pts |
|---|---|---|---|---|---|---|---|---|
| Tahiti | 3 | 3 | 0 | 0 | 14 | 7 | +7 | 9 |
| Iran | 3 | 2 | 0 | 1 | 12 | 9 | +3 | 6 |
| Portugal | 3 | 1 | 0 | 2 | 10 | 14 | –4 | 3 |
| Mexico | 3 | 0 | 0 | 3 | 8 | 14 | –6 | 0 |

3 November 2015
16:15

| Portugal | 5–3 | Mexico |
|---|---|---|
| Torres 8'; Belchior 14', 27'; Coimbra 16'; Madjer 26' | Report | Gomez 21', 33'; Rodriguez 33' |

Jumeirah Beach, Dubai

3 November 2015
20:00

| Tahiti | 4–2 | Iran |
|---|---|---|
| Tepa 7'; Zaveroni 9'; N. Bennett 20'; Taiarui 26' | Report | Ahmadzadeh 25', 35' |

Jumeirah Beach, Dubai

4 November 2015
16:15

| Mexico | 3–4 | Tahiti |
|---|---|---|
| | Report |

Jumeirah Beach, Dubai

4 November 2015
20:00

| Iran | 5–3 | Portugal |
|---|---|---|
| | Report |

Jumeirah Beach, Dubai

5 November 2015
17:30

| Portugal | 2–6 | Tahiti |
|---|---|---|
| | Report |

Jumeirah Beach, Dubai

5 November 2015
20:00

| Mexico | 2–5 | Iran |
|---|---|---|
| | Report |

Jumeirah Beach, Dubai

== Classification stage ==
5–8 places
6 November – Jumeirah Beach
Portugal | 6
Argentina | 2
6 November – Jumeirah Beach
UAE | 3
Mexico | 2

Fifth place
7 November – Jumeirah Beach
Portugal | 1
UAE | 4
Seventh place
7 November – Jumeirah Beach
Argentina | 2
Mexico | 6

=== 5–8 places ===
6 November 2015
16:15

| Portugal | 6–2 | Argentina |
|---|---|---|
| | Report |

Jumeirah Beach, Dubai

6 November 2015
17:30

| UAE | 3–2 | Mexico |
|---|---|---|
| | Report |

Jumeirah Beach, Dubai

=== Seventh place match ===
7 November 2015
12:15

| Argentina | 2–6 | Mexico |
|---|---|---|
| | Report |

Jumeirah Beach, Dubai

=== Fifth place match ===
7 November 2015
13:30

| Portugal | 1–4 | UAE |
|---|---|---|
| | Report |

Jumeirah Beach, Dubai

== Championship stage ==
Semi-finals
6 November – Jumeirah Beach
Tahiti | 8
Egypt | 5
6 November – Jumeirah Beach
Russia | 4
Iran | 1

Final
7 November – Jumeirah Beach
Tahiti | 2
Russia | 5
Third place
7 November – Jumeirah Beach
Egypt | 2 (2)
Iran | 2 (3)

=== Semi-finals ===
6 November 2015
18:45

| Tahiti | 8–5 | Egypt |
|---|---|---|
| | Report |

Jumeirah Beach, Dubai

6 November 2015
20:00

| Russia | 4–1 | Iran |
|---|---|---|
| | Report |

Jumeirah Beach, Dubai

=== Third place match ===
7 November 2015
15:45

| Egypt | 2–2 (a.e.t.) | Iran |
|---|---|---|
| | Report |
Penalties
| | 2–3 |

Jumeirah Beach, Dubai

=== Final ===
7 November 2015
17:00

| Tahiti | 2–5 | Russia |
|---|---|---|
| | Report |

Jumeirah Beach, Dubai

== Awards ==
Best Player (MVP)
(Russia) Yury Krasheninnikov
Top Scorer
(Egypt) Mohamed Gamal
Best Goalkeeper
(United Arab Emirates) Humaid Albalooshi

== Top scorers ==
| Rank | Player | Goals |

== Final standings ==
| Rank | Team |
|---|---|
| 1 | Russia |
| 2 | Tahiti |
| 3 | Iran |
| 4 | Egypt |
| 5 | UAE |
| 6 | Portugal |
| 7 | Mexico |
| 8 | Argentina |
