= 2014 Beach Soccer Intercontinental Cup =

Tournament details
- Host country: United Arab Emirates
- Dates: 04–08 November 2014
- Teams: 8 (from 5 confederations)
- Venue(s): 1 (in 1 host city)

Final positions
- Champions: Brazil (1st title)
- Runners-up: Russia
- Third place: Portugal
- Fourth place: Iran

Tournament statistics
- Matches played: 20
- Goals scored: 134 (6.7 per match)
- Top scorer(s): (Brazil) Bruno Xavier (Russia) Dmitry Shishin (Iran) Mohammad Ahmadzadeh (Japan) Takasuke Goto (6 goals)
- Best player(s): (Brazil) Mão
- Best goalkeeper: (Brazil) Mão

The 2014 Beach Soccer Intercontinental Cup was the fourth edition of the tournament, Beach Soccer Intercontinental Cup. It took place at Jumeirah Beach in Dubai, United Arab Emirates from 04 to 8 November 2014. Eight teams participated in the competition.

== Participating teams ==
Team	Confederation	Achievements	Participation
United Arab Emirates	AFC	Host	4th
Russia	UEFA	2013 FIFA Beach Soccer World Cup winners	4th
United States	CONCACAF	2013 FIFA Beach Soccer WCQ (CONCACAF) winners	2nd
Brazil	CONMEBOL	2013 FIFA Beach Soccer World Cup third place	4th
Iran	AFC	2013 FIFA Beach Soccer WCQ (AFC) winners	2nd
Morocco	CAF	2013 FIFA Beach Soccer WCQ (CAF) third place	2nd
Japan	AFC	2013 FIFA Beach Soccer WCQ (AFC) runners-up	2nd
Portugal	UEFA	2013 Euro Beach Soccer League runners-up	1st

== Group stage ==
All matches are listed as local time in Dubai, (UTC+4).

Legend
Teams that advanced to the semi finals

=== Group A ===
Team	Pld	W	W+	L	GF	GA	+/-	Pts
Portugal	3	3	0	0	13	8	+5	9
Iran	3	2	0	1	9	5	+4	6
Morocco	3	1	0	2	8	14	-6	3
United Arab Emirates	3	0	0	3	6	9	-3	0

4 November 2014
18:45

United Arab Emirates	3-4	Morocco
A.Daryaei 25', 26'; H. Alhamadi 30'	Report 1	7', 16', 33' El. Nassim; 14' El.Azzeddine

Jumeirah Beach, Dubai

4 November 2014
20:00

Iran	2-4	Portugal
	[ Report 1] [ Report 2]

Jumeirah Beach, Dubai

5 November 2014
16:15

Portugal	6-4	Morocco
	[ Report 1] [ Report 2]

Jumeirah Beach, Dubai

5 November 2014
20:00

United Arab Emirates	1-2	Iran
	[ Report 1] [ Report 2]

Jumeirah Beach, Dubai

6 November 2014
18:45

Portugal	3-2	United Arab Emirates
	[ Report 1] [ Report 2]

Jumeirah Beach, Dubai

6 November 2014
20:00

Morocco	0-5	Iran
	[ Report 1] [ Report 2]

Jumeirah Beach, Dubai

=== Group B ===
Team	Pld	W	W+	L	GF	GA	+/-	Pts
Russia	3	3	0	0	16	5	+11	9
Brazil	3	2	0	1	18	9	+9	6
Japan	3	1	0	2	10	17	-7	3
United States	3	0	0	3	5	18	-13	0

4 November 2014
16:15

United States	3-10	Brazil
	[ Report 1] [ Report 2]

Jumeirah Beach, Dubai

4 November 2014
17:30

Russia	9-3	Japan
	[ Report 1] [ Report 2]

Jumeirah Beach, Dubai

5 November 2014
17:30

Brazil	7-4	Japan
	[ Report 1] [ Report 2]

Jumeirah Beach, Dubai

5 November 2014
18:15

Russia	5-1	United States
	[ Report 1] [ Report 2]

Jumeirah Beach, Dubai

6 November 2014
16:15

Japan	3-1	United States
	[ Report 1] [ Report 2]

Jumeirah Beach, Dubai

6 November 2014
17:30

Brazil	1-2	Russia
	[ Report 1] [ Report 2]

Jumeirah Beach, Dubai

== Classification stage ==
5–8 places
7 November – Jumeirah Beach
Russia	4
Iran	3
7 November – Jumeirah Beach
Portugal	3
Brazil	5

Fifth place
7 November – Jumeirah Beach
Iran	0
Portugal	3
Seventh place
7 November – Jumeirah Beach
Russia	2
Brazil	3

=== 5–8 places ===
7 November 2014
16:15

Japan	3-4	United Arab Emirates
	Report 1 Report 2

Jumeirah Beach, Dubai

7 November 2014
17:30

Morocco	7 – 3	United States
	Report 1 Report 2

Jumeirah Beach, Dubai

=== Seventh place match ===
8 November 2014
16:15

Japan	6-1	United States
	Report 1 Report 2

Jumeirah Beach, Dubai

=== Fifth place match ===
8 November 2014
17:30

United Arab Emirates	2 – 4 (a.e.t.)	Morocco
	Report 1 Report 2

Jumeirah Beach, Dubai

== Championship stage ==
Semi-finals
7 November – Jumeirah Beach
Russia	4
Iran	3
7 November – Jumeirah Beach
Portugal	3
Brazil	5

Final
8 November – Jumeirah Beach
Russia	2
Brazil (a.e.t.)	3
Third place
8 November – Jumeirah Beach
Iran	0
Portugal	3

=== Semi-finals ===
7 November 2014
18:45

Russia	4 – 3	Iran
	Report 1 Report 2

Jumeirah Beach, Dubai

7 November 2014
20:00

Portugal	3 – 5	Brazil
	Report 1 Report 2

Jumeirah Beach, Dubai

=== Third place ===
8 November 2014
18:45

Iran	0 – 3	Portugal
	Report 1 Report 2

Jumeirah Beach, Dubai

=== Final ===
8 November 2014
20:00

Russia	2 – 3 (a.e.t.)	Brazil
	Report 1 Report 2

Jumeirah Beach, Dubai

== Awards ==
Best Player (MVP)
(Brazil) Mao
Top Scorer
(Russia) Dimitry Shishin (Iran) Mohammad Ahmadzadeh (Japan) Goto (Brazil) Bruno Xavier

Best Goalkeeper
(Brazil) Mao

== Top scorers ==
Rank	Player	Goals
1	(Iran) Mohammad Ahmadzadeh	6
2	(Brazil) Bruno Xavier	6
3	(Russia) Dmitry Shishin	6
4	(Japan) Takasuka Goto	6

== Final standings ==
Rank	Team
1	Brazil
2	Russia
3	Portugal
4	Iran
5	Morocco
6	United Arab Emirates
7	Japan
8	United States
