= Andrey Bukhlitskiy =

Russian beach soccer player

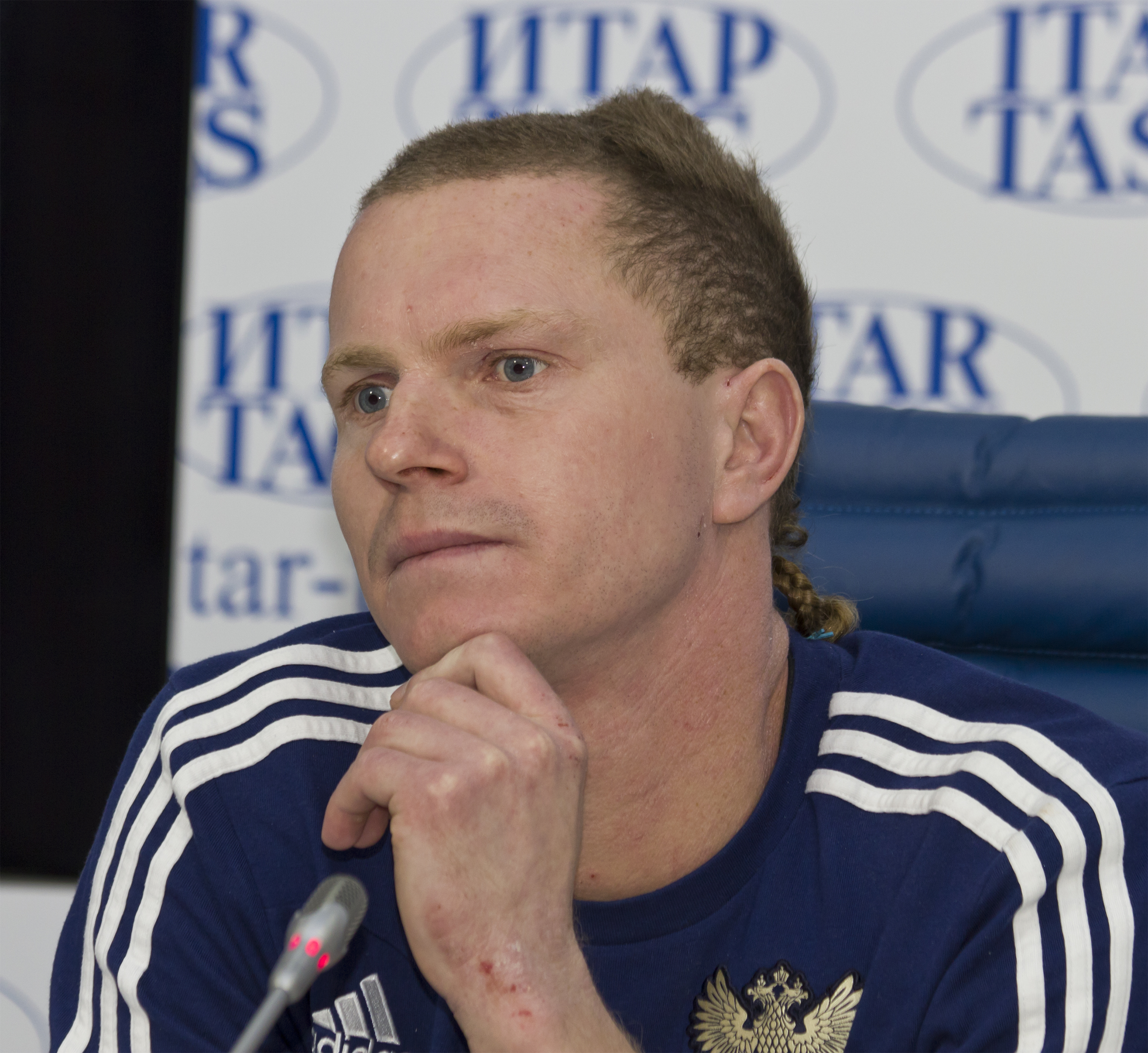

Personal information
- Full name: Andrey Nikolayevich Bukhlitskiy
- Date of birth: 7 February 1982 (age 44)
- Place of birth: Russia
- Height: 1.83 m (6 ft 0 in)
- Position: Goalkeeper

Senior career*
Years	Team	Apps	(Gls)
2000–2002	FC Titan Reutov	66	(0)
2002	FC Kuzbass-Dynamo Kemerovo	3	(0)
2004	FC Izhevsk	3	(0)
2004	FC Volga Tver	10	(0)
2010	Krylia Sovetov (beach soccer)		
2010–2011	Lokomotiv Moscow (beach soccer)		
2010–2012	Barcelona (beach soccer)		
2012–2017	Lokomotiv Moscow (beach soccer)		

International career
2007–2015	Russia (beach soccer)		
- * Club domestic league appearances and goals

Andrey Nikolayevich Bukhlitsky (Russian: Андрей Николаевич Бухлицкий; born 7 February 1982) is a former Russian beach soccer player who represented Russia in international competitions. His role was goalkeeper.

Bukhlitsky is a goalkeeper who was selected as the best keeper of EBSL 2007 season, captured the best keeper award in season regular phase event for 3 times consecutive in that season. He is currently a goalkeeper coach for the national team.

== Achievements ==
=== National team ===
- 2007 Season
  - EBSL Superfinal, Marseille, France: 3rd Place
  - EBSL Regular Phase Event, Tignes, France: Champions
  - EBSL Regular Phase Event, San Benedetto del Tronto, Italy: Champions
- 2008 Season
  - ESBL Regular Phase Event, Tignes, France: Champions (beaten France 8–3 at final)
  - FIFA World Cup: Marseille, France: Quarter-Finals (lost to Brazil)
- 2011 Season
  - 2011 FIFA Beach Soccer World Cup, Ravenna, Italy: Champions

=== Individual ===
- 2007 Season
  - ESBL Total season: Best Goalkeeper
  - EBSL Regular Phase Event, Tignes, France: Best Goalkeeper
  - EBSL Regular Phase Event, Portimão, Portugal: Best Goalkeeper
  - EBSL Regular Phase Event, San Benedetto del Tronto, Italy: Best Goalkeeper
- 2008 Season
  - EBSL Regular Stage Event, Tignes, France: Best Goalkeeper
- 2011 Season
  - 2011 FIFA Beach Soccer World Cup: adidas Golden Glove
- 2012 Season
  - Merited Master of Sports (21 December 2012)

=== Club ===
Lokomotiv Moscow (beach soccer)

- Russian National Beach Soccer Championship (1): 2011
- Russian National Beach Soccer Championship — Best Goalkeeper (1): 2011
