= 2017 Beach Soccer Intercontinental Cup =

Tournament details
- Host country: United Arab Emirates
- City: Dubai
- Dates: October 31 – November 4
- Teams: 8 (from 5 confederations)
- Venue: 1 (in 1 host city)

Final positions
- Champions: Brazil (3rd title)
- Runners-up: Portugal
- Third place: Iran
- Fourth place: Russia

Tournament statistics
- Matches played: 20
- Goals scored: 151 (7.55 per match)
- Top scorer: (Portugal) Jordan Santos (8 goals)
- Best player: (Brazil) Rodrigo
- Best goalkeeper: (Brazil) Mão

The 2017 Beach Soccer Intercontinental Cup, also known as the Huawei Beach Soccer Intercontinental Cup Dubai 2017 for sponsorship reasons, was the seventh edition of the Beach Soccer Intercontinental Cup, an annual international beach soccer tournament contested by men's national teams, held in Dubai, United Arab Emirates.

After the FIFA Beach Soccer World Cup, the Intercontinental Cup is the biggest tournament in the current international beach soccer calendar. Similar to the FIFA Confederations Cup, eight nations took part, with one team representing each of the six continental football confederations (except for the OFC) as well as the current World Cup champions, Brazil, and the hosts, the United Arab Emirates.

The tournament started with a group stage, played in a round robin format. The winners and runners-up from each group advanced to the knockout stage, in which the teams then competed in single-elimination matches, beginning with the semi-finals and ending with the final. A third-place deciding match was also contested by the losing semi-finalists. The third and fourth placed nations from each group played in a series of consolation matches to decide fifth through eighth place.

This tournament was the last in a deal signed between Beach Soccer Worldwide (BSWW) and the Dubai Sports Council (DSC) in 2012 in which it was agreed the two parties would organise the tournament until 2017. This year's event occurred between October 31 and November 4.

Brazil were the defending champions and successfully retained their title by beating Portugal in the final to claim their third Intercontinental Cup crown.

== Participating teams ==
Eight teams took part including the hosts, current World Cup winners and one of the best performing nations from each of the six regional championships hosted by the confederations of FIFA. However, the OFC did not enter a team this year, so UEFA entered two teams.

As incumbent continental champions, Senegal were originally invited to play as the African representatives but were unable to compete due to financial issues.

Overall, Europe, Asia and South America were represented by two nations, Africa and North America one nation and Oceania, none.

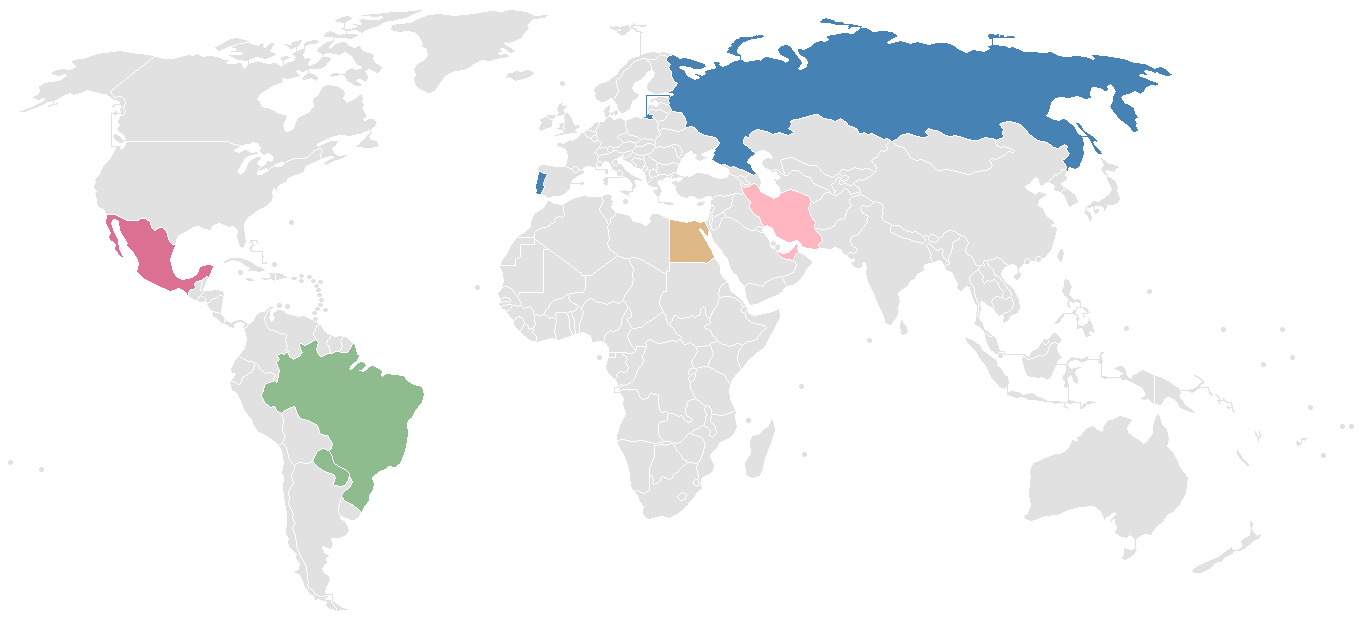
Map highlighting the participating teams of the 2017 Beach Soccer Intercontinental Cup

Team	Confederation	Achievements	Participation
United Arab Emirates	AFC	Hosts^{1}	7th
Brazil	CONMEBOL	2017 FIFA Beach Soccer World Cup winners	6th
Iran	AFC	2017 AFC Beach Soccer Championship winners	5th
Egypt	CAF	2016 Africa Beach Soccer Cup of Nations third place	3rd
Mexico	CONCACAF	2017 CONCACAF Beach Soccer Championship runners-up	4th
Paraguay	CONMEBOL	2017 CONMEBOL Beach Soccer Championship runners-up	Debut
Russia	UEFA	2017 Euro Beach Soccer League winners	7th
Portugal	UEFA	2017 Euro Beach Soccer League runners-up	3rd

1. Qualified as hosts, but also achieved a 2017 AFC Beach Soccer Championship runners-up finish

== Venue ==
This edition of the Intercontinental Cup took place in a new venue, in Dubai's Business Bay on the banks of the Dubai Water Canal, having taken place on Jumeirah Beach, Dubai Festival City and the Dubai International Marine Club in previous years. The new stadium had a capacity of 3,000.

Speaking at the draw event, BSWW Vice-president thanked the Dubai International Marine Club for hosting the previous events but explained that due to "external reasons" the competition would be hosted in a new part of the city in 2017. He added the new venue would be easier to access by prospective spectators and that tickets would remain free for fans as in previous years.

== Sponsors ==
The following were the official sponsors of the tournament:

- Huawei (lead sponsors)
- Audi
- Al Nabooda Automobiles
- Havaianas
- Pepsi
- Aquafina
- Dubai Stars Sportsplex
- Pocari Sweat
- Havoline
- Desert Stallion

== Draw ==
The draw to split the eight teams into two groups of four was conducted at 11:00 GST on October 3 at the headquarters of the DSC in the Dubai Design District. Teams from the same confederation could not be drawn into the same group. The draw was conducted by Aml Wael and Nora Al Mazrouie, members of the UAE's women's national association football team.

For the purposes of the draw, the nations were divided into two sets, Pot 1 and Pot 2, shown in the table below. The allocation of teams into each Pot was based on previous performances in the championship. The first pot contained the three former champions of the Intercontinental Cup and, additionally, the hosts. The second pot contained the other four remaining participants who have not won the tournament before. Two teams from each pot were drawn into Group A and two teams from each pot were drawn into Group B, with the hosts, the United Arab Emirates, automatically allocated to position A1.

Prior to the draw, the eight teams were described as the strongest contingent the championship had ever seen.

Pot 1	Pot 2
United Arab Emirates (10; hosts) (Note: Assigned to A1); Brazil (1); Iran (2); Russia (5)	Portugal (3); Paraguay (8); Mexico (12); Egypt (19)

Note: The numbers in parentheses show the world ranking of the teams at the time of the draw.

== Group stage ==
The match schedule was announced on October 11.

Matches are listed as local time in Dubai, GST (UTC+4)

=== Group A ===
Pos	Team	Pld	W	W+	WP	L	GF	GA	GD	Pts	Qualification
1	Brazil	3	3	0	0	0	30	8	+22	9	Knockout stage
2	Portugal	3	1	0	1	1	13	14	−1	4	Knockout stage
3	Egypt	3	1	0	0	2	13	20	−7	3	Consolation matches
4	United Arab Emirates (H)	3	0	0	0	3	11	25	−14	0	Consolation matches

Source: BSWW
(H) Host
31 October 2017
16:15

Egypt	3–11	Brazil
Rashed 1'; Abdelnabi 19'; Gamal 21'	Report(ru)	9', 26' Bruno Xavier; 15', 20' Datinha; 17', 35' Lucas; 26', 32', 33' Rodrigo; 31', 36' Bokinha

Marasi Business Bay, Dubai
Referee: Ingilab Mammadov (Azerbaijan)
31 October 2017
17:30

Portugal	6–4	United Arab Emirates
Léo Martins 1'; Jordan 11', 20', 27', 36'; Madjer 35'	Report(ru)	12' A. Mohammadi; 14' Ali Karim; 31', 33' Hasham

Marasi Business Bay, Dubai
Referee: Shao Liang (China)

1 November 2017
16:15

United Arab Emirates	3–4	Egypt
Alkaabi 1'; A. Mohammadi 4'; Hasham 11'	Report(ru)	2' H. Ataf; 4' Gamal; 16' Hassan; 32' Moustafa

Marasi Business Bay, Dubai
Attendance: Yuichi Hatano (Japan)
1 November 2017
17:30

Brazil	4–1	Portugal
Rodrigo 7', 24'; Bokinha 16'; Fernando DDI 22'	Report(ru)	17' Duarte

Marasi Business Bay, Dubai
Referee: Raúl Martín González Francés (Spain)

2 November 2017
17:30

Egypt	6–6 (a.e.t.)	Portugal
Hassan 2'; Gamal 14'; Rashed 17', 27'; Abdelnabi 27'; Ali 29'	Report(ru)	2', 9', 34' Jordan; 3' Bê Martins; 5', 12' Madjer
Penalties
Shaaban (penalty scored); Mohamed (penalty missed)	1–3	(penalty scored) Madjer; (penalty scored) Pedro Silva; (penalty scored) Jordan

Marasi Business Bay, Dubai
Referee: Viktor Listratov (Russia)
2 November 2017
18:45

United Arab Emirates	4–15	Brazil
Alkaabi 2'; A. Beshr 1', 31'; W. Bashr 23' (pen.)	Report(ru)	2', 7', 28', 33' Bruno Xavier; 7', 23', 31', 32' Lucas; 11' Fernando DDI; 12', 18' Lucao; 15' Mauricinho; 16', 26' Rodrigo; 21' Rafa Padilha

Marasi Business Bay, Dubai
Referee: Shao Liang (China)

=== Group B ===
Pos	Team	Pld	W	W+	WP	L	GF	GA	GD	Pts	Qualification
1	Russia	3	2	1	0	0	12	6	+6	8	Knockout stage
2	Iran	3	2	0	0	1	12	7	+5	6	Knockout stage
3	Paraguay	3	1	0	0	2	8	11	−3	3	Consolation matches
4	Mexico	3	0	0	0	3	7	15	−8	0	Consolation matches

Source: BSWW
31 October 2017
18:45

Russia	6–2	Mexico
N. Kryshanov 6'; Krasheninnikov 8'; Pavlenko 11'; Nikonorov 17', 36'; Romanov 18'	Report(ru)	27' Maldonado; 29' Piñeda

Marasi Business Bay, Dubai
Referee: Ebrahim Almansory (United Arab Emirates)
31 October 2017
20:00

Iran	5–2	Paraguay
Ahmadzadeh 11', 34'; Akbari 22'; Mokhtari 24'; Mesigar 33'	Report(ru)	12' Ojeda; 12' Carballo

Marasi Business Bay, Dubai
Referee: Gionni Matticoli (Italy)

1 November 2017
18:45

Paraguay	1–2	Russia
Barreto 34'	Report(ru)	24' Nikonorov; 35' Paporotnyi

Marasi Business Bay, Dubai
Referee: Ahmed Al Salami (United Arab Emirates)
1 November 2017
20:00

Mexico	1–4	Iran
Akbari 23' (o.g.)	Report(ru)	16' Ahmadzadeh; 30' Mesigar; 35' Akbari; 36' Mirshekari

Marasi Business Bay, Dubai
Referee: Ebrahim Al Raeesi (United Arab Emirates)

2 November 2017
16:15

Mexico	4–5	Paraguay
Samano 4'; Maldonado 7', 18'; Gallardo 14'	Report(ru)	4', 6', 34' Carballo; 27' Rolón; 35' Barreto

Marasi Business Bay, Dubai
Referee: Ebrahim Al Raeesi (United Arab Emirates)
2 November 2017
20:00

Iran	3–4 (a.e.t.)	Russia
Hosseini 11'; Abdollahi 15'; Ahmadzadeh 31'	Report(ru)	1', 2', 4' Makarov; 37' (o.g.) Abdollahi

Marasi Business Bay, Dubai
Referee: Gionni Matticoli (Italy)

== Consolation matches ==
The teams finishing in third and fourth place were knocked out of title-winning contention, receding to play in consolation matches to determine 5th through 8th place in the final standings.

5th–8th place semi-finals
3 November
Egypt (a.e.t.)	6
Mexico	5
3 November
Paraguay	1
United Arab Emirates	4

Fifth place play-off
4 November
Egypt	1
United Arab Emirates	2
Seventh place play-off
4 November
Mexico	0
Paraguay	3

=== 5th to 8th place semi-finals ===
3 November 2017
16:15

Egypt	6–5 (a.e.t.)	Mexico
Rashed 17'; A. Hassan 17', 24'; Hassan 31'; Moustafa 36'; Gamal 38'	Report(ru)	2' (pen.) Gallardo; 5', 32' Vizcarra; 10' Maldonado; 21' A. Rodriguez

Marasi Business Bay, Dubai
Referee: Gionni Matticoli (Italy)
3 November 2017
17:30

Paraguay	1–4	United Arab Emirates
Rolon 25'	Report(ru)	14', 34' Alkaabi; 21' Hasham; 36' A. Beshr

Marasi Business Bay, Dubai
Referee: Raúl Martín González Francés (Spain)

=== Seventh place play-off ===
4 November 2017
16:15

Mexico	0–3	Paraguay
	Report(ru)	6', 23' Carballo; 27' B. Roa

Marasi Business Bay, Dubai
Referee: Viktor Listratov (Russia)

=== Fifth place play-off ===
4 November 2017
17:30

Egypt	1–2	United Arab Emirates
Moustafa 28'	Report(ru)	24' A. Ali; 35' Ali Karim

Marasi Business Bay, Dubai
Referee: Shao Liang (China)

== Knockout stage ==
The group winners and runners-up progressed to the knockout stage to continue to compete for the title.

Semi-finals
3 November
Russia	2
Portugal	3
3 November
Brazil	6
Iran	4

Final
4 November
Portugal	0
Brazil	2
Third place play-off
4 November
Russia	2
Iran	4

=== Semi-finals ===
3 November 2017
18:45

Russia	2–3	Portugal
Chuzhkov 12'; Paporontyi 16'	Report(ru)	9' Bruno Novo; 27' Andrade; 35' Jordan

Marasi Business Bay, Dubai
Referee: Ingilab Mammadov (Azerbaijan)
3 November 2017
20:00

Brazil	6–4	Iran
Datinha 4', 15'; Bokinha 12'; Filipe 14'; Bruno Xavier 20' (pen.); Mauricinho 34'	Report(ru)	11' Nazem; 20', 30', 33' Kiani

Marasi Business Bay, Dubai
Referee: Yuichi Hatano (Japan)

=== Third place play-off ===
4 November 2017
18:45

Russia	2–4	Iran
Nikonorov 17'; Romanov 29'	Report(ru)	20' Behzadpour; 22' Ahmadzadeh; 28' Moradi; 36' Kiani

Marasi Business Bay, Dubai
Referee: Ebrahim Almansory (United Arab Emirates)

=== Final ===
4 November 2017
20:00

Portugal	0–2	Brazil
	Report(ru)	17' Bokinha; 20' Filipe

Marasi Business Bay, Dubai
Referee: Gionni Matticoli (Italy)

== Awards ==
=== Winners trophy ===
2017 Beach Soccer Intercontinental Cup
champions

Brazil
Third title

=== Individual awards ===
Top scorer
(Portugal) Jordan Santos
8 goals
Best player
(Brazil) Rodrigo
Best goalkeeper
(Brazil) Mão

Source Archived 2017-11-07 at the Wayback Machine

== Statistics ==
=== Goalscorers ===
8 goals

- (Portugal) Jordan Santos

7 goals

- (Brazil) Rodrigo
- (Brazil) Bruno Xavier

6 goals

- (Brazil) Lucas
- (Paraguay) Carlo Carballo

5 goals

- (Iran) Mohammad Ahmadzadeh
- (Brazil) Bokinha

4 goals

- (Iran) Mostafa Kiani
- (Brazil) Datinha
- (United Arab Emirates) Haitham Mohamed
- (United Arab Emirates) Hasham Almuntaser
- (Egypt) Mohamed Gamal Hassan
- (Russia) Boris Nikonorov
- (Mexico) Ramón Maldonado
- (Egypt) Elhusseini Taha Rashed Aly

3 goals

- (United Arab Emirates) Ahmed Beshr
- (Russia) Aleksey Makarov
- (Portugal) Madjer
- (Egypt) Hassane Mohamed Hassane Hussein
- (Egypt) Moustafa Ahmed Shaaban

2 goals

- (Egypt) Abdelrahman Hassan Ahmed Hassan
- (Mexico) José Vizcarra
- (Mexico) Lugiani Gallardo
- (Brazil) Lucao
- (Brazil) Filipe
- (Brazil) Fernando DDI
- (Iran) Moslem Mesigar
- (Iran) Seyed Ali Nazem
- (Egypt) Mohamed Abdelnaby
- (Iran) Amir Akbari
- (United Arab Emirates) Ali Karim
- (Paraguay) Edgar Barreto
- (Brazil) Mauricinho
- (United Arab Emirates) Ali Mohammad
- (Russia) Artur Paporotnyi
- (Paraguay) Jesus Rolon
- (Russia) Kirill Romanov

1 goal

- (Portugal) Duarte Vivo
- (Egypt) Haitham Atef
- (Russia) Alexey Pavlenko
- (Portugal) Elinton Andrade
- (Russia) Nikolai Kryshanov
- (Portugal) Be Martins
- (Iran) Ali Mirshekari
- (Iran) Mohammad Moradi
- (Iran) Mohammad Mokhtari
- (Paraguay) Bonifacio Roa
- (United Arab Emirates) Abbas Ali
- (Egypt) Mohamed Abdelnaby Aly Aly Hassan
- (United Arab Emirates) Waleed Bashr
- (Iran) Hamid Behzadpour
- (Russia) Yuri Krasheninnikov
- (Portugal) Leo Martins
- (Portugal) Bruno Novo
- (Paraguay) Luis Ojeda
- (Brazil) Rafael Padilha
- (Mexico) Angel Rodriguez
- (Mexico) Erick Samano Aleman
- (Mexico) Ulises Torres Pineda
- (Iran) Peyman Hosseini
- (Russia) Maxim Chuzhkov

Own goals

- (Iran) Amir Akbari (vs. Mexico)
- (Iran) Hassan Abdollahi (vs. Russia)

=== Final standings ===
Pos	Grp	Team	Pld	W	W+	WP	L	GF	GA	GD	Pts	Final result
1	A	Brazil	5	5	0	0	0	38	12	+26	15	Champions
2	A	Portugal	5	2	0	1	2	16	18	−2	7	Runners-up
3	B	Iran	5	3	0	0	2	20	15	+5	9	Third place
4	B	Russia	5	2	1	0	2	16	13	+3	8	
5	A	United Arab Emirates	5	2	0	0	3	17	27	−10	6	
6	A	Egypt	5	1	1	0	3	20	27	−7	5	
7	B	Paraguay	5	2	0	0	3	12	15	−3	6	
8	B	Mexico	5	0	0	0	5	12	24	−12	0	

Source: BSWW
