= 2018 Beach Soccer Intercontinental Cup =

Tournament details
- Host country: United Arab Emirates
- City: Dubai
- Dates: 6–10 November
- Teams: 8 (from 6 confederations)
- Venue: 1 (in 1 host city)

Final positions
- Champions: Iran (2nd title)
- Runners-up: Russia
- Third place: Brazil
- Fourth place: Egypt

Tournament statistics
- Matches played: 20
- Goals scored: 186 (9.3 per match)
- Top scorer: (Russia) Fedor Zemskov (9 goals)
- Best player: (Brazil) Rodrigo
- Best goalkeeper: (Iran) Hamid Behzadpour

The 2018 Beach Soccer Intercontinental Cup, also known as the Huawei Beach Soccer Intercontinental Cup Dubai 2018 for sponsorship reasons, was the eighth edition of the Beach Soccer Intercontinental Cup, an annual international beach soccer tournament contested by men's national teams.

Held in Dubai, United Arab Emirates since its inception, this year's event occurred between 6 and 10 November. The tournament was organised by the Dubai Sports Council (DSC) and Beach Soccer Worldwide (BSWW).

After the FIFA Beach Soccer World Cup, the Intercontinental Cup is the biggest tournament in the current international beach soccer calendar. Similar to the FIFA Confederations Cup, eight nations will take part, with one team representing each of the six continental football confederations as well as the current World Cup champions, Brazil, and the hosts, the United Arab Emirates.

The tournament started with a round robin group stage. The winners and runners-up from each group advanced to the knockout stage, a series of single-elimination matches, beginning with the semi-finals and ending with the final. Consolation matches were also played to determine other final rankings.

The season-ending Beach Soccer Stars awards were also presented in Dubai as a conclusion to the tournament.

Brazil were the defending champions but lost to Russia in the semi-finals, ultimately finishing third; the defeat ended a 66-game winning streak for Canarinhos, their last loss dating back to the 2015 World Cup (also against Russia). Iran beat Russia in the final to claim their second Intercontinental Cup crown.

== Participating teams ==
The following eight teams took part including the hosts, current World Cup winners and one of the best performing nations from each of the six regional championships hosted by the confederations of FIFA. However, CONMEBOL did not enter a regional performer this year, so UEFA entered two teams.

Overall, Europe and Asia were represented by two nations; Africa, South America, North America and Oceania, one nation each.

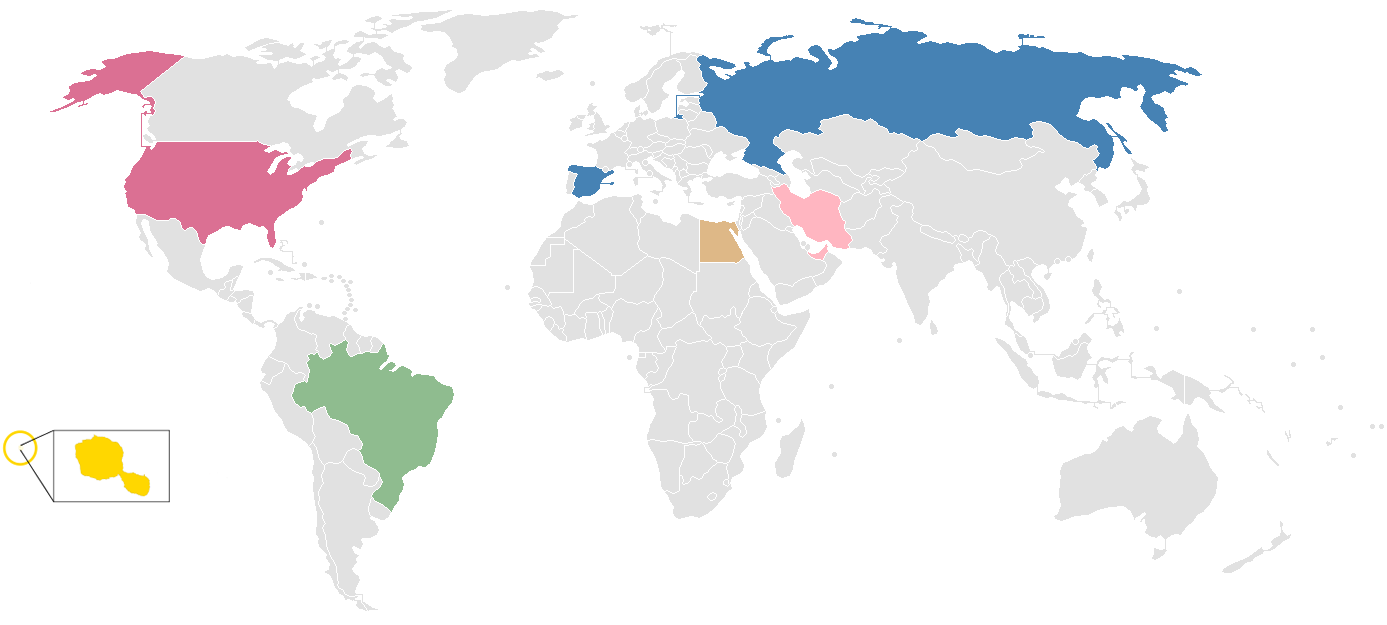
Map highlighting the participating teams of the 2018 Beach Soccer Intercontinental Cup

Team	Confederation	Recent achievements	Participation
United Arab Emirates	AFC	Hosts^{1}	8th
Brazil	CONMEBOL	2017 FIFA Beach Soccer World Cup winners	7th
Iran	AFC	2017 AFC Beach Soccer Championship winners	6th
Egypt	CAF	2016 Africa Beach Soccer Cup of Nations third place	4th
Russia	UEFA	2018 Euro Beach Soccer League fourth place	8th
Spain	UEFA	2018 Euro Beach Soccer League runners-up	Debut
Tahiti	OFC	2017 FIFA Beach Soccer World Cup runners-up	5th
United States	CONCACAF	2017 CONCACAF Beach Soccer Championship fifth place	4th

1. Qualified as hosts, but also achieved a 2017 AFC Beach Soccer Championship runners-up finish

== Venue ==
The tournament took place in a new part of Dubai for the second consecutive year; this edition is held at an arena on Kite Beach, Jumeirah 3, with a capacity of 3,500.

Speaking at the draw event, BSWW Vice-president Joan Cusco was welcoming of the change of location back to a beach venue saying, "this is where we belong". (The previous edition was held in an inland area of Dubai for the first time). On the change of venue, DSC General Secretary Saeed Hareb stated the Council was in the process of finding a permanent home for the Intercontinental Cup.

== Sponsors ==
The following were the official sponsors of the tournament:

- Huawei (lead sponsors)
- Audi
- Emirates
- RAKBANK
- Continental
- Vitamin Well
- Mycujoo
- Aquafina
- Pocari Sweat

== Draw ==
The draw to split the eight teams into two groups of four took place on 10 October at the Dubai Sports Council headquarters at 11:00 GST (UTC+4).

For the purposes of the draw, the nations were divided into fours sets, Pots 1–4, shown in the table below. From each pot, the first team drawn out was placed into Group A; the other team was drawn into Group B. The teams were allocated to specific positions in their respective groups via the drawing of balls from a further two pots; for the teams entering Group A, Pot A, which contained the positions A1–A4 and for the teams entering Group B, Pot B, containing the positions B1–B4.

The hosts, the United Arab Emirates, were automatically allocated to position A1.

Pot 1	Pot 2	Pot 3	Pot 4
United Arab Emirates (11; hosts) (Note: Assigned to A1); Iran (3)	Russia (5); Spain (10)	Brazil (1); Tahiti (6)	Egypt (18); United States (24)

Note: The numbers in parentheses show the world ranking of the teams at the time of the draw.

== Group stage ==
Matches are listed as local time in Dubai, GST (UTC+4)

=== Group A ===
Pos	Team	Pld	W	W+	WP	L	GF	GA	GD	Pts	Qualification
1	Brazil	3	3	0	0	0	24	8	+16	9	Knockout stage
2	Egypt	3	2	0	0	1	15	17	−2	6	Knockout stage
3	United Arab Emirates (H)	3	1	0	0	2	7	16	−9	3	5th–8th place play-offs
4	Spain	3	0	0	0	3	12	17	−5	0	5th–8th place play-offs

Source: BSWW
(H) Host
6 November 2018
16:15

Brazil	5–2	Spain
Bruno Xavier 14', 33'; Datinha 20', 28'; Rodrigo 23'	Report(ru)	19' Suarez; 22' Llorenç

Referee: Bakhtiyor Namazov (Uzbekistan)
6 November 2018
17:30

United Arab Emirates	1–3	Egypt
A. Mohammadi 13'	Report(ru)	1' A. Elshahat; 30' H. Ataf; 32' Mohamed

Referee: Christian Zimmermann (Switzerland)

7 November 2018
16:15

Egypt	5–10	Brazil
A. Elshahat 10'; Samir 16'; Mohamed 19'; H. Atef 20'; Hassane 33'	Report(ru)	3' Bruno Xavier; 5', 11', 20' (pen.) Igor; 10' Mauricinho; 10' Bokinha; 12', 33' Rodrigo; 32' Filipe; 34' Rafinha

Referee: Sergio Gomes Soares (Portugal)
7 November 2018
17:30

Spain	4–5	United Arab Emirates
Llorenç 1', 31', 31'; Antonio 26'	Report(ru)	7', 21' Almuntaser; 13', 13' A. Beshr; 24' A. Mohammadi

Referee: Suhaimi Mat Hassan (Malaysia)

8 November 2018
17:30

Egypt	7–6	Spain
M. Sasa 4', 14', 34' (pen.), 36'; Mohamed 6'; Hassane 21'; A. Elshahat 36'	Report(ru)	6', 15' Javi Torres; 14' Suarez; 17' Chiky; 21' Adril; 21' Llorenç

Referee: Bakhtiyor Namazov (Uzbekistan)
8 November 2018
18:45

United Arab Emirates	1–9	Brazil
A. Ali 36'	Report(ru)	8', 15' Filipe; 29' Igor; 31' Mao; 31' Mauricinho; 33' Antonio; 34' Rafinha; 34' (o.g.) A. Beshr; 34' Bruno Xavier

Referee: Denis Smolyaninov (Russia)

=== Group B ===
Pos	Team	Pld	W	W+	WP	L	GF	GA	GD	Pts	Qualification
1	Iran	3	3	0	0	0	15	5	+10	9	Knockout stage
2	Russia	3	2	0	0	1	22	12	+10	6	Knockout stage
3	Tahiti	3	0	1	0	2	15	17	−2	2	5th–8th place play-offs
4	United States	3	0	0	0	3	10	28	−18	0	5th–8th place play-offs

Source: BSWW
6 November 2018
18:45

Tahiti	6–7	Russia
Taiarui 8'; Tavanae 24', 25'; Revel 26'; Lebaste 30'; Li Fung Kuee 34'	Report(ru)	1' Chuzhkov; 8', 19' Zemskov; 8', 14' Paporotyni; 10' Nikonorov; 34' Shkarin

Referee: Sergio Gomes Soares (Portugal)
6 November 2018
20:00

Iran	8–1	United States
Moradi 3', 20'; Akbari 10'; Ahmedzadeh 10'; Kiani 13'; Mesigar 16'; Masoumizadeh 23' (pen.); Mirshekari 24'	Report(ru)	28' Silveira

Referee: Ebrahim Almansory (United Arab Emirates)

7 November 2018
18:45

Russia	13–3	United States
Zemskov 1', 19', 24', 29', 32', 36'; Novikov 5'; Paporotyni 6'; Krasheninnikov 17', 35'; Shishin 20'; Romanov 21', 34'	Report(ru)	2' Mondragon; 11', 33' Albiston

Referee: Ibrahim Alraeesi (United Arab Emirates)
7 November 2018
20:00

Tahiti	2–4	Iran
Lebaste 19'; Tavanae 36'	Report(ru)	9' Akbari; 11', 19' Masoumizadeh; 12' Behzadpour

8 November 2018
16:15

Tahiti	7–6 (a.e.t.)	United States
Taiarui 2', 38'; Labaste 3'; Li Fung Kuee 16' (pen.), 19', 32'; Tavanae 35'	Report(ru)	2' Silveira; 7', 8', 13' Canale; 31' Perera; 35' Toth

Referee: Ebrahim Almansory (United Arab Emirates)
8 November 2018
20:00

Iran	3–2	Russia
Akbari 11'; Piramoun 12'; Behzadpour 32'	Report(ru)	28' Romanov; 29' Zemskov

Referee: Christian Zimmermann (Switzerland)

== 5th–8th place play-offs ==
The teams finishing in third and fourth place were knocked out of title-winning contention, receding to play in consolation matches to determine 5th through 8th place in the final standings.

5th–8th place semi-finals
9 November
Tahiti	1
Spain	9
9 November
United Arab Emirates	3
United States	5

Fifth place play-off
10 November
Spain	3
United States	4
Seventh place play-off
10 November
Tahiti	6
United Arab Emirates	7

=== 5th to 8th place semi-finals ===
9 November 2018
16:15

Tahiti	1–9	Spain
Lebaste 6'	Report(ru)	10' Cintas; 10', 12' Javi Torres; 13' Suarez; 16', 28' Guisado; 19' Domi; 25' Frutos; 32' Adril

Referee: Christian Zimmermann (Switzerland)
9 November 2018
17:30

United Arab Emirates	3–5	United States
A. Beshr 2'; Ali Karim 11'; A. Mohammadi 33'	Report(ru)	7' Albiston; 12', 22', 32' (pen.) Perera; 31' Silveira

Referee: Sergio Gomes Soares (Portugal)

=== Seventh place play-off ===
10 November 2018
16:15

Tahiti	6–7	United Arab Emirates
Taiarui 9'; Li Fung Kuee 16'; Tavanae 17', 26'; Labaste 21'; Salem 27'	Report(ru)	12' Ali Karim; 19', 32' Walid; 29', 33' (pen.) A. Beshr; 35', 36' W. Beshr

Referee: Denis Smolyaninov (Russia)

=== Fifth place play-off ===
10 November 2018
17:30

Spain	3–4	United States
Suarez 1', 18' (pen.), 26'	Report(ru)	4' Canale; 15' Mondragon; 30' Perera; 31' Silveira

Referee: Turki Al Salehi (Oman)

== Knockout stage ==
The group winners and runners-up progressed to the knockout stage to continue to compete for the title.

Semi-finals
9 November
Iran	3
Egypt	1
9 November
Russia (p)	5 (3)
Brazil	5 (1)

Final
10 November
Iran	4
Russia	2
Third place play-off
10 November
Egypt	3
Brazil	5

=== Semi finals ===
9 November 2018
18:45

Iran	3–1	Egypt
Masoumizadeh 20'; Mirshekari 31'; Kiani 32'	Report(ru)	32' (pen.) M. Samir

Referee: Ebrahim Almansory (United Arab Emirates)
9 November 2018
20:00

Russia	5–5 (a.e.t.)	Brazil
Makarov 7'; Nikonorov 13', 39'; Paporotnyi 19', 25'	Report(ru)	25', 31' Bruno Xavier; 35' Datinha; 36', 37' Rodrigo
Penalties
Krash (penalty scored); Shishin (penalty scored); Makarov (penalty scored)	3–1	(penalty scored) Igor; (penalty missed) Filipe

Referee: Suhaimi Mat Hassan (Malaysia)

=== Third place play-off ===
10 November 2018
18:45

Egypt	3–5	Brazil
Mohamed 5', 10'; M. Sasa 33'	Report(ru)	3' Filipe; 7', 20', 33' Rodrigo; 27' Mauricinho

=== Final ===
10 November 2018
20:00

Iran	4–2	Russia
Kiani 4'; Masoumizadeh 7', 24'; Behzadpour 11'	Report(ru)	13', 31' Paporotnyi

Referee: Bakhtiyor Namazov (Uzbekistan)

== Awards ==
=== Winners trophy ===
2018 Beach Soccer Intercontinental Cup
champions

Iran
Second title

=== Individual awards ===
Top scorer
(Russia) Fedor Zemskov
9 goals
Best player
(Brazil) Rodrigo
Best goalkeeper
(Iran) Hamid Behzadpour

== Statistics ==
=== Goalscorers ===
9 goals

- (Russia) Fedor Zemskov

8 goals

- (Brazil) Rodrigo

7 goals

- (Russia) Artur Paporotnyi

6 goals

- (Egypt) Moustafa Aly Mohamed
- (Brazil) Bruno Xavier
- (Iran) Mohammad Masoumizadeh
- (Spain) Eduard Suarez

5 goals

- (Spain) Llorenç Gomez
- (French Polynesia) Heiarii Tavanae
- (United Arab Emirates) Ahmed Beshr
- (French Polynesia) Tearii Labaste
- (French Polynesia) Raimana Li Fung Kuee
- (United States) Nick Perera

4 goals

- (Egypt) Mohamed Abdelnaby
- (Brazil) Igor Melo
- (Brazil) Filipe Silva
- (United States) Tomas Canale
- (United States) Gabriel Silveira
- (Spain) Javi Torres

3 goals

- (Russia) Boris Nikonorov
- (Iran) Amirhosein Akbari
- (United States) Christopher Albiston
- (Iran) Hamid Behzadpour
- (Egypt) Ahmed Elshahat
- (Brazil) Mauricinho
- (Brazil) Datinha
- (Iran) Mostafa Kiani
- (United Arab Emirates) Ali Mohammadi
- (Russia) Kirill Romanov
- (French Polynesia) Taiarui Heimanu

2 goals

- (Spain) David Adril
- (Egypt) Moustafa Samir
- (United Arab Emirates) Ali Karim
- (United Arab Emirates) Hasham Almuntaser
- (Brazil) Rafinha
- (Egypt) Haitham Atef
- (United Arab Emirates) Waleed Beshr
- (Spain) Adrian Frutos
- (Spain) Fernando Guisado
- (Russia) Yury Krasheninnikov
- (Iran) Ali Mirshekari
- (United States) David Mondragon
- (Iran) Mohammad Moradi
- (United Arab Emirates) Walid Mohammadi
- (Egypt) Mohamed Hassane

1 goal

- (Iran) Mohammed Ahmadzadeh
- (French Polynesia) Franck Revel
- (Spain) Domingo Cabrera
- (Russia) Andrei Novikov
- (French Polynesia) Ariihau Teriitau
- (United Arab Emirates) Abbas Ali
- (Spain) Salvador "Chiky" Ardil
- (Portugal) Mao
- (Brazil) Bokinha
- (French Polynesia) Teva Zaveroni
- (Russia) Aleksey Makarov
- (Iran) Moslem Mesigar
- (Iran) Saeid Piramoun
- (United States) Christopher Toth
- (Brazil) Antonio Farias
- (French Polynesia) Salem Heirauarii
- (Spain) Jose Cintas
- (Russia) Maxim Chuzhkov
- (Russia) Dmitry Shishin
- (Russia) Anton Shkarin

Own goals

- (United Arab Emirates) Ahmed Beshr (vs. Brazil)

=== Final standings ===
Pos	Grp	Team	Pld	W	W+	WP	L	GF	GA	GD	Pts	Final result
1	B	Iran	5	5	0	0	0	22	8	+14	15	Champions
2	B	Russia	5	2	0	1	2	29	21	+8	7	Runners-up
3	A	Brazil	5	4	0	0	1	34	16	+18	12	Third place
4	A	Egypt	5	2	0	0	3	19	25	−6	6	
5	B	United States	5	2	0	0	3	19	34	−15	6	Eliminated in Group stage
6	A	Spain	5	1	0	0	4	24	22	+2	3	Eliminated in Group stage
7	A	United Arab Emirates	5	2	0	0	3	17	27	−10	6	Eliminated in Group stage
8	B	Tahiti	5	0	1	0	4	22	33	−11	2	Eliminated in Group stage

Source: BSWW
