= Beach Soccer Intercontinental Cup =

- Organiser(s): BSWW; DSC
- Founded: 2011
- Region: International (FIFA)
- Teams: 8
- Current champions: Iran (4th title)
- Most championships: Iran; Russia (each with 4 titles)
- Website: BSWW
- 2022 Beach Soccer Intercontinental Cup

The Beach Soccer Intercontinental Cup is an international beach soccer tournament which is held in Dubai, the United Arab Emirates every November as the finale of the competitive international beach soccer season. The invitation-only tournament was held annually from the inaugural edition in 2011 until 2022, and has been postponed since 2023.

The Intercontinental Cup has been described by the beach soccer magazine BAREFOOT as the second largest and most prestigious event on the international beach soccer circuit after only the FIFA Beach Soccer World Cup, featuring an exclusive assembly of the world's best national teams from each continent.

The competition bares many similarities to the FIFA Confederations Cup in association football, with each of the six confederations of FIFA (UEFA, CONMEBOL, CONCACAF, CAF, AFC, OFC) represented by at least one nation, however is not so strict on entry requirements – those countries competing do not necessarily have to be regional champions, but nevertheless will still be one of the best performing nations from their confederation's most recent regional championship. The tournament hosts and reigning World Cup champions also take part, taking the total number of participants to eight.

Samsung was the lead sponsor and presenting partner of the tournament from its inception until 2016. Huawei became new lead sponsors for 2017–18. The Dubai Sports Council (DSC) and Beach Soccer Worldwide (BSWW) organise the competition.

Russia and Iran are the most successful teams, having won four tournaments each. Iran is also the current champions.

== Organisation ==
=== Foundation ===
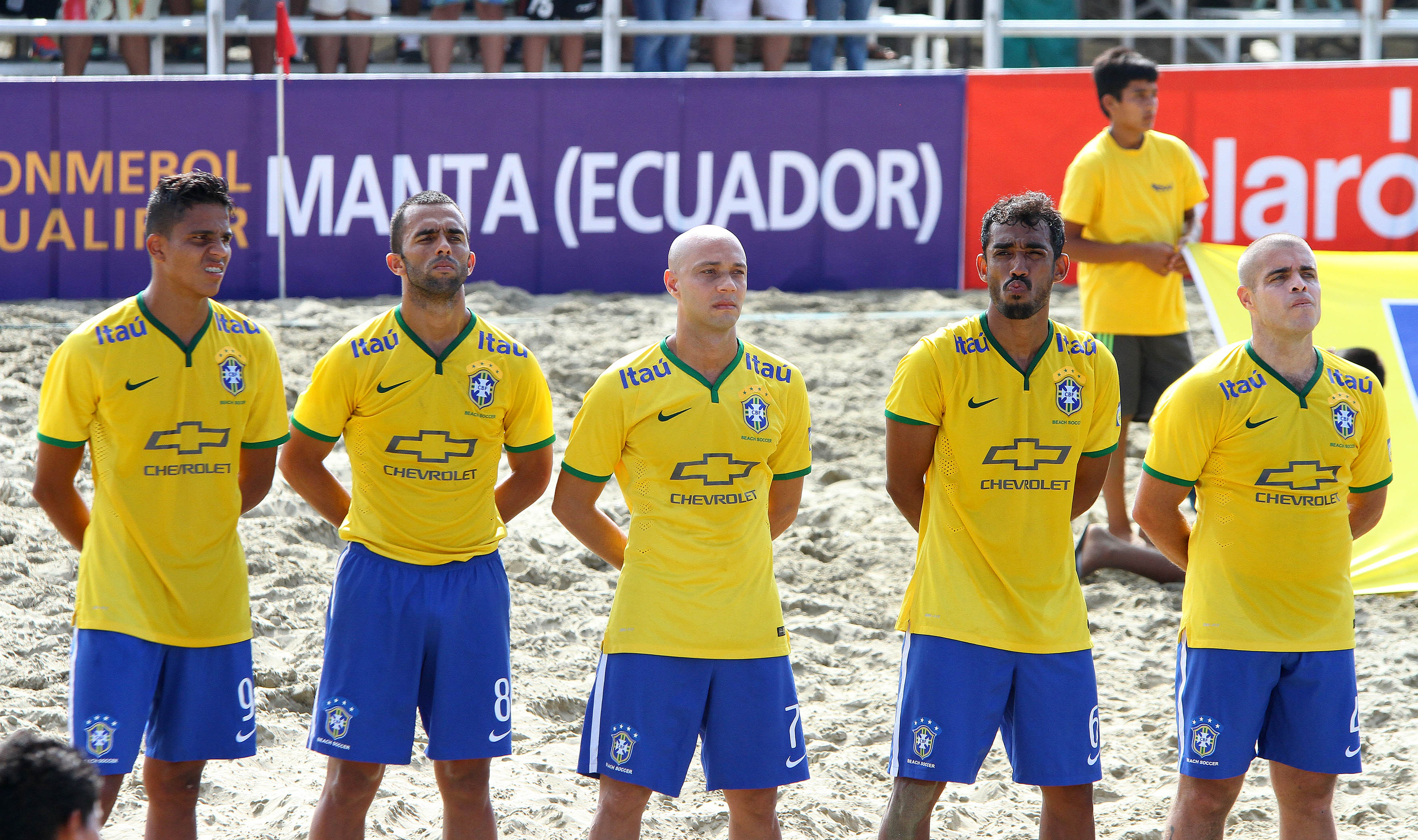
Brazil, pictured here in 2015, are 3 times champions

Dubai first hosted a beach soccer event in 2000 and since 2006, the city began holding annual events, culminating with the hosting of beach soccer's premier event in 2009, the FIFA Beach Soccer World Cup. During 2009, Emirates and FIFA struck an agreement to have the former sponsor and fund football tournaments worldwide. In connection to this deal, Dubai was offered to host an event in either youth football, women's football or beach soccer. DSC decided on beach soccer following the success and popularity of the World Cup.

BSWW were also keen on returning beach soccer to Dubai, with Vice-president Joan Cusco claiming Dubai as beach soccer's "second most important city in this sport" save for Rio de Janeiro. After using the time in 2010 to consider how to take beach soccer forward in the city following the World Cup success, an agreement was made between BSWW and DSC in 2011 to host the new Intercontinental Cup.

It was desired by BSWW to have the tournament respect the legacy and be a celebration of the 2009 Dubai World Cup. Therefore, it was believed the idea of the competition, featuring the world's very best teams from each continent, modelled notably similarly to association football's secondary international event, the FIFA Confederations Cup, would be best suited to achieve these goals. After a successful maiden event in 2011, BSWW and DSC decided to make the tournament an annual occurrence, signing a 5-year contract in 2012. In 2017, at the end of the 5-year deal, the two parties extended the existing contract to 2020.

During this time, the championship's reputation has grown quickly because of the high level of elite competition only comparable to the World Cup and, combined with the yearly presence of the championship, it has become beach soccer's most prestigious annual event (considering the fact that the World Cup is now a biannual event).

=== Venues ===
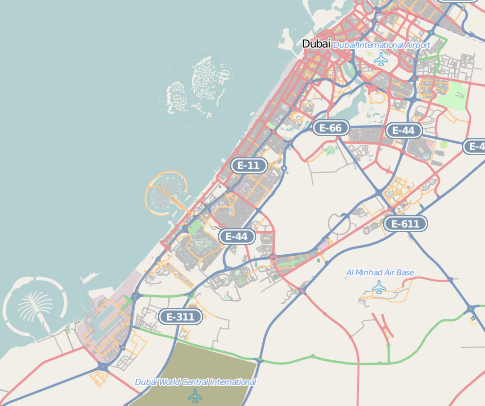
Locations of the former venues across Dubai

Despite always taking place in Dubai to date, the tournament has been staged in multiple different parts of the city.

- 2011: The Walk, Jumeirah Beach Residence
- 2012: Festival City
- 2013–16: Dubai International Marine Club
- 2017: Business Bay
- 2018–19: Kite Beach

=== Format ===
The Intercontinental Cup is a 5-day event. The eight teams are split into two groups of four. The tournament starts with the group stage, played in a round robin format, taking place during days one through three. The winners and runners-up from each group advanced to the knockout stage, in which the teams then compete in single-elimination matches, beginning with the semi-finals and ending with the final on days four and five respectively. A third-place play-off is also contested by the losing semi-finalists on day five. The third and fourth placed nations from each group play in a series of consolation matches to decide fifth through eighth place however these matches have only occurred since 2013.

== Results ==
Year	Hosts	Final			Third place match		
Year	Hosts	Champion	Score	Runner-up	Third place	Score	Fourth place
2011; Details	Dubai, United Arab Emirates	Russia	5–4 (a.e.t.)	Brazil	Switzerland	4–4 (a.e.t.) (1–0 pen.)	United Arab Emirates
2012; Details	Dubai, United Arab Emirates	Russia	7–4	Brazil	United Arab Emirates	8–7 (a.e.t.)	Nigeria
2013; Details	Dubai, United Arab Emirates	Iran	4–3	Russia	United Arab Emirates	8–7	Switzerland
2014; Details	Dubai, United Arab Emirates	Brazil	3–2 (a.e.t.)	Russia	Portugal	3–0	Iran
2015; Details	Dubai, United Arab Emirates	Russia	5–2	Tahiti	Iran	2–2 (a.e.t.) (3–2 pen.)	Egypt
2016; Details	Dubai, United Arab Emirates	Brazil	6–2	Iran	Russia	4–3	Tahiti
2017; Details	Dubai, United Arab Emirates	Brazil	2–0	Portugal	Iran	4–2	Russia
2018; Details	Dubai, United Arab Emirates	Iran	4–2	Russia	Brazil	5–3	Egypt
2019; Details	Dubai, United Arab Emirates	Iran	6–3	Spain	United Arab Emirates	2–1 (a.e.t.)	Russia
2021; Details	Dubai, United Arab Emirates	Russia	3–2	Iran	Senegal	7–4	Portugal
2022; Details	Dubai, United Arab Emirates	Iran	2–1	Brazil	Paraguay	4–1	United Arab Emirates

== Medals (2011-2022) ==
Rank	Nation	Gold	Silver	Bronze	Total
1	Russia (RUS)	4	3	1	8
2	Iran (IRI)	4	2	2	8
3	Brazil (BRA)	3	3	1	7
4	Portugal (POR)	0	1	1	2
5	French Polynesia (TAH)	0	1	0	1
5	Spain (ESP)	0	1	0	1
7	United Arab Emirates (UAE)	0	0	3	3
8	Paraguay (PAR)	0	0	1	1
8	Senegal (SEN)	0	0	1	1
8	Switzerland (SUI)	0	0	1	1
Totals (10 entries)		11	11	11	33

== Successful teams ==
#	Team	Titles	Runners-up	Third place	Fourth place	Total
1	Russia	4 (2011, 2012, 2015, 2021)	3 (2013, 2014, 2018,)	1 (2016)	2 (2017, 2019)	10
2	Iran	4 (2013, 2018, 2019, 2022)	2 (2016, 2021)	2 (2015, 2017)	1 (2014)	9
3	Brazil	3 (2014, 2016, 2017)	3 (2011, 2012, 2022)	1 (2018)	–	7
4	Portugal	–	1 (2017)	1 (2014)	1 (2021)	3
5	Tahiti	–	1 (2015)	–	1 (2016)	2
6	Spain	–	1 (2019)	–	–	1
7	United Arab Emirates	–	–	3 (2012, 2013, 2019)	2 (2011, 2022)	5
8	Switzerland	–	–	1 (2011)	1 (2013)	2
9	Paraguay	–	–	1 (2022)	–	1
9	Senegal	–	–	1 (2021)	–	1
10	Egypt	–	–	–	2 (2015, 2018)	2
11	Nigeria	–	–	–	1 (2012)	1

== Success by confederation ==
Total times teams played by confederation
	AFC	CAF	CONCACAF	CONMEBOL	OFC	UEFA	Total
Teams	27	10	10	12	5	24	88
Top 4	14	4	0	8	2	16	44
Top 2	6	0	0	6	1	9	22
1st	4	0	0	3	0	4	11
2nd	2	0	0	3	1	5	11
3rd	5	1	0	2	0	3	11
4th	3	3	0	0	1	4	11

== Awards ==
Year	Top goalscorer(s)	Gls	Best player	Best goalkeeper	Ref.
2011	(Switzerland) Dejan Stankovic	12	(Switzerland) Dejan Stankovic	(Brazil) Mão	
2012	(Brazil) Fernando DDI	10	(Russia) Egor Shaykov	(Russia) Andrey Bukhlitskiy	
2013	(Switzerland) Dejan Stankovic	17	(Iran) Mohammad Ahmadzadeh	(Russia) Andrey Bukhlitskiy	
2014	(Brazil) Bruno Xavier (Russia) Dmitry Shishin (Iran) Mohammad Ahmadzadeh (Japan) Takasuke Goto	6	(Brazil) Mão	(Brazil) Mão	
2015	(Egypt) Mohamed Gamal	9	(Russia) Yury Krasheninnikov	(United Arab Emirates) Humaid Albalooshi	
2016	(Brazil) Bruno Xavier	8	(Brazil) Bruno Xavier	(Iran) Peyman Hosseini	
2017	(Portugal) Jordan Santos	8	(Brazil) Rodrigo	(Brazil) Mão	
2018	(Russia) Fedor Zemskov	9	(Brazil) Rodrigo	(Iran) Hamid Behzadpour	
2019	(Iran) Amir Hossein Akbari	6	(United Arab Emirates) Waleed Beshr	(United Arab Emirates) Mohamad Al Jasmi	
2021	(Spain) Chiky	9	(Russia) Boris Nikonorov	(Iran) Hamid Behzadpour	
2022	(Paraguay) Carlos Carballo	8	(Iran) Amir Hossein Akbari	(Iran) Hamid Behzadpour	

=== Total Awards (2011-2022) ===
Rank	Team	Numbers
1	Brazil	10
2	Iran	8
3	Russia	8
4	United Arab Emirates	3
5	Switzerland	3
6	Spain,Egypt,Japan,Portugal,Paraguay	1

== Summary (2011-2022) ==
Rank	Team	Part	M	W	WE	WP	L	GF	GA	GD	Points
1	Russia	10	50	30	4	3	13	250	163	+87	101
2	Brazil	8	40	30	2	1	7	233	115	+118	95
3	Iran	9	45	27	1	7	10	182	130	+52	90
4	United Arab Emirates	11	55	19	3	3	30	172	217	–45	66
5	Portugal	4	20	10	0	1	9	75	79	–4	31
6	Japan	5	23	10	0	0	13	101	98	+3	30
7	Egypt	5	25	9	1	0	15	96	119	–23	29
8	Tahiti	5	21	7	1	0	13	86	108	–22	23
9	Paraguay	3	15	6	1	0	8	66	64	+2	20
10	Spain	4	20	6	0	1	13	83	87	–4	19
11	Switzerland	3	13	5	1	1	6	77	66	+11	18
12	Mexico	5	23	4	0	0	19	66	94	–28	12
13	Senegal	1	5	3	0	0	2	29	24	+5	9
14	Italy	2	10	3	0	0	7	44	54	–10	9
15	Nigeria	2	8	3	0	0	5	36	46	–10	9
16	United States	5	23	3	0	0	20	61	133	–72	9
17	Morocco	2	10	2	1	0	7	35	44	–9	8
18	Poland	1	5	1	0	2	2	17	18	–1	5
19	Oman	1	3	0	0	0	3	6	16	–10	0
20	Argentina	1	5	0	0	0	5	14	27	–13	0
21	Saudi Arabia	1	5	0	0	0	5	3	30	–27	0

Points: W = 3 points / WE = 2 points / WP = 1 points / L = 0 points

== Performance timeline & Appearances ==
Key

- 1st — Champions
- 2nd — Runners-up
- 3rd — Third place
- 4th — Fourth place
- 5th–8th — Fifth to eighth place
- × — Did not participate
- — Hosts
- — Reigning world champions
- Apps — Appearances

Teams \ Years	2011	2012	2013	2014	2015	2016	2017	2018	2019	2021	2022	Apps
Argentina	×	×	×	×	8th	×	×	×	×	×	×	1
Brazil	2nd	2nd	5th	1st	×	1st	1st	3rd	×	×	2nd	8
Egypt	×	×	×	×	4th	6th	6th	4th	6th	×	×	5
Iran	×	×	1st	4th	3rd	2nd	3rd	1st	1st	2nd	1st	9
Italy	×	×	6th	×	×	×	×	×	7th	×	×	2
Japan	×	7th	×	7th	×	×	×	×	5th	5th	5th	5
Mexico	6th	×	7th	×	7th	×	8th	×	8th	×	×	5
Morocco	×	×	8th	5th	×	×	×	×	×	×	×	2
Nigeria	5th	4th	×	×	×	×	×	×	×	×	×	2
Oman	7th	×	×	×	×	×	×	×	×	×	×	1
Paraguay	×	×	×	×	×	×	7th	×	×	7th	3rd	3
Poland	×	×	×	×	×	5th	×	×	×	×	×	1
Portugal	×	×	×	3rd	6th	×	2nd	×	×	4th	×	4
Russia	1st	1st	2nd	2nd	1st	3rd	4th	2nd	4th	1st	×	10
Saudi Arabia	×	×	×	×	×	×	×	×	×	×	8th	1
Senegal	×	×	×	×	×	×	×	×	×	3rd	×	1
Spain	×	×	×	×	×	×	×	6th	2nd	6th	7th	4
Switzerland	3rd	5th	4th	×	×	×	×	×	×	×	×	3
Tahiti	8th	6th	×	×	2nd	4th	×	8th	×	×	×	5
United Arab Emirates	4th	3rd	3rd	6th	5th	7th	5th	7th	3rd	8th	4th	11
United States	×	8th	×	8th	×	8th	×	5th	×	×	6th	5

== All-time top goalscorers ==
As of 2022

The following table shows the all-time top 20 goalscorers.

Rank	Player	Team	Pld	Goals	GPG
1	Bruno Xavier	Brazil	28	42	1.50
2	Dejan Stanković	Switzerland	13	37	2.85
3	Mohammad Ahmadzadeh	Iran	39	36	0.92
4	Dmitry Shishin	Russia	37	28	0.76
5	Yuri Krasheninnikov	Russia	45	27	0.60
6	Boris Nikonorov	Russia	23	25	1.09
7	Alexey Makarov	Russia	35	24	0.69
8	Rodrigo	Brazil	17	23	1.35
8	Ali Karim	United Arab Emirates	45	23	0.51
10	Egor Shaykov	Russia	18	22	1.22
11	Mauricinho	Brazil	24	21	0.88
11	Ahmed Beshr	United Arab Emirates	40	21	0.53
13	Fernando DDI	Brazil	21	20	0.95
13	Artur Paporotnyi	Russia	29	20	0.69
13	Mohammad Mokthari	Iran	34	20	0.59
13	Waleed Beshr	United Arab Emirates	39	20	0.51
17	Naea Bennett	Tahiti	20	19	0.95
18	Anatoly Permitin	Russia	19	17	0.89
18	Ozu Moreira	Japan	20	17	0.85
18	Takaaki Oba	Japan	20	17	0.85

2011, 2012, 2013, 2014, 2015, 2016, 2017, 2018, 2019, 2021, 2022
