= 2022 Beach Soccer Intercontinental Cup =

Tournament details
- Host country: United Arab Emirates
- City: Dubai
- Dates: 1–6 November
- Teams: 8 (from 4 confederations)
- Venue(s): 1 (in 1 host city)

Final positions
- Champions: Iran (4th title)
- Runners-up: Brazil
- Third place: Paraguay
- Fourth place: United Arab Emirates

Tournament statistics
- Matches played: 20
- Goals scored: 140 (7 per match)
- Top scorer(s): (Paraguay) Carlos Carballo (8 goals)
- Best player(s): (Iran) Amir Hossein Akbari
- Best goalkeeper: (Iran) Hamid Behzadpour

Beach Soccer Intercontinental Cup 2022 was the 11th edition of the Beach Soccer Intercontinental Cup, an annual international beach soccer tournament contested by men's national teams. This year's event occurred between 1 and 6 November 2022 in Dubai, United Arab Emirates. The tournament is organised by the Dubai Sports Council (DSC) and Beach Soccer Worldwide (BSWW).

The Intercontinental Cup is typically seen as the biggest tournament in the current international beach soccer calendar after the FIFA Beach Soccer World Cup. Similar in nature to that of the FIFA Confederations Cup, eight nations took part.

The tournament starts with a round robin group stage. The winners and runners-up from each group advance to the knockout stage, a series of single-elimination matches, beginning with the semi-finals and ending with the final. Consolation matches are also played to determine other final rankings.

The season-ending Beach Soccer Stars awards are also presented in Dubai as a conclusion to the tournament.

Russia is defending champions but they were absent in this event.

== Participating teams ==
The following eight teams took part.

Team	Confederation	Recent achievements	Participation
United Arab Emirates	AFC	Hosts	11th
Iran	AFC		9th
Japan	AFC		5th
Saudi Arabia	AFC		debut
Paraguay	CONMEBOL		3rd
United States	CONCACAF		5th
Spain	UEFA		4th
Brazil	CONMEBOL		8th

== Group stage ==
Matches are listed as local time in Dubai, GST (UTC+4)

=== Group A ===
Pos	Team	Pld	W	W+	WP	L	GF	GA	GD	Pts	Qualification
1	Brazil	3	3	0	0	0	17	3	+14	9	Knockout stage
2	United Arab Emirates (H)	3	2	0	0	1	10	6	+4	6	Knockout stage
3	Spain	3	1	0	0	2	9	12	−3	3	5th–8th place play-offs
4	Saudi Arabia	3	0	0	0	3	0	15	−15	0	5th–8th place play-offs

Source: BSWW
(H) Host
1 November 2022
17:15

Spain	3–4	United Arab Emirates

1 November 2022
18:45

Saudi Arabia	0–6	Brazil

2 November 2022
17:15

Brazil	8–2	Spain

2 November 2022
18:45

United Arab Emirates	5–0	Saudi Arabia

3 November 2022
17:15

Saudi Arabia	0–4	Spain

3 November 2022
18:45

United Arab Emirates	1–3	Brazil

=== Group B ===
Pos	Team	Pld	W	W+	WP	L	GF	GA	GD	Pts	Qualification
1	Iran	3	2	1	0	0	16	9	+7	8	Knockout stage
2	Paraguay	3	2	0	0	1	14	14	0	6	Knockout stage
3	Japan	3	1	0	0	2	11	13	−2	3	5th–8th place play-offs
4	United States	3	0	0	0	3	8	13	−5	0	5th–8th place play-offs

Source: BSWW
1 November 2022
16:00

United States	1–3	Japan

1 November 2022
20:00

Paraguay	2–6	Iran

2 November 2022
16:00

Japan	5–8	Paraguay

2 November 2022
20:00

Iran	6–4	United States

3 November 2022
16:00

United States	3–4	Paraguay

3 November 2022
20:00

Iran	4–3 (a.e.t.)	Japan

== 5th–8th place play-offs ==
The teams finishing in third and fourth place are knocked out of title-winning contention, receding to play in consolation matches to determine 5th through 8th place in the final standings.

5th–8th place semi-finals
5 November
Spain	3
United States	4
5 November
Japan	10
Saudi Arabia	3

Fifth place play-off
6 November
United States	0
Japan	4
Seventh place play-off
6 November
Spain	5
Saudi Arabia	0

=== 5th–8th place semi-finals ===
4 November 2022
16:00

Spain	3–4	United States

4 November 2022
17:15

Japan	10–3	Saudi Arabia

=== Seventh place play-off ===
6 November 2022
16:00

Spain	5–0	Saudi Arabia

=== Fifth place play-off ===
6 November 2022
17:15

Japan	4–0	United States

== Knockout stage ==
Semi-finals
5 November
Brazil	6
Paraguay	5
5 November
Iran	5
United Arab Emirates	2

Final
6 November
Brazil	1
Iran	2
Third place play-off
6 November
Paraguay	4
United Arab Emirates	1

=== Semi-finals ===
5 November 2022
18:45

Brazil	6–5	Paraguay

5 November 2022
20:00

Iran	5–2	United Arab Emirates

=== Third place play-off ===
6 November 2022
18:45

Paraguay	4–1	United Arab Emirates

=== Final ===
6 November 2022
20:00

Brazil	1–2	Iran

== Awards ==
=== Winners trophy ===
2022 Beach Soccer Intercontinental Cup
champions

Iran
4th title

== Statistics ==
=== Final standings ===
Pos	Grp	Team	Pld	W	W+	OL	L	GF	GA	GD	Pts	Final result
1	B	Iran	5	4	1	0	0	23	12	+11	14	Champions
2	A	Brazil	5	4	0	0	1	24	10	+14	12	Runners-up
3	B	Paraguay	5	3	0	0	2	23	21	+2	9	Third place
4	A	United Arab Emirates	5	2	0	0	3	13	15	−2	6	
5	B	Japan	5	3	0	0	2	25	16	+9	9	Eliminated in Group stage
6	B	United States	5	1	0	0	4	12	20	−8	3	Eliminated in Group stage
7	A	Spain	5	2	0	0	3	17	16	+1	6	Eliminated in Group stage
8	A	Saudi Arabia	5	0	0	0	5	3	30	−27	0	Eliminated in Group stage

Source: BSWW
