= 2016 Beach Soccer Intercontinental Cup =

2016 Samsung Beach Soccer Intercontinental Cup
Tournament details
- Host country: United Arab Emirates
- Dates: 1–5 November 2016
- Teams: 8 (from 6 confederations)
- Venue(s): 1 (in 1 host city)

Final positions
- Champions: Brazil (2nd title)
- Runners-up: Iran
- Third place: Russia
- Fourth place: Tahiti

Tournament statistics
- Matches played: 20
- Goals scored: 179 (8.95 per match)
- Top scorer(s): (Brazil) Bruno Xavier (8 goals)
- Best player(s): (Brazil) Bruno Xavier
- Best goalkeeper: (Iran) Peyman Hosseini

The 2016 Samsung Beach Soccer Intercontinental Cup was the sixth edition of the Beach Soccer Intercontinental Cup, an annual international beach soccer tournament. It was hosted at Jumeirah Beach in Dubai, United Arab Emirates from 1 to 5 November 2016. Eight teams participated in the competition, ending with Brazil winning their second title.

For sponsorship reasons, it is also known as the Samsung Beach Soccer Intercontinental Cup Dubai 2016.

== Participating teams ==
Team	Confederation	Achievements	Participation
United Arab Emirates	AFC	Host	6th
Poland	UEFA	2017 FIFA Beach Soccer World Cup qualification winners	1st
United States	CONCACAF	2015 CONCACAF Beach Soccer Championship fourth place	3rd
Russia	UEFA	2015 FIFA Beach Soccer World Cup third place	6th
Iran	AFC	2015 AFC Beach Soccer Championship third place	4th
Egypt	CAF	2015 CAF Beach Soccer Championship sixth place	2nd
Tahiti	OFC	2015 FIFA Beach Soccer World Cup runners-up	4th
Brazil	CONMEBOL	2015 CONMEBOL Beach Soccer Championship winners	5th

== Group stage ==
All matches are listed as local time in Dubai, (UTC+4).

Legend
Teams that advanced to the semi-finals

=== Group A ===
Team	Pld	W	W+	L	GF	GA	+/-	Pts
Brazil	3	3	0	0	26	7	+19	9
Tahiti	3	2	0	1	16	17	-1	6
Poland	3	0	1	2	8	12	–4	1
United Arab Emirates	3	0	0	3	6	20	–14	0

1 November 2016
16:15

Tahiti	5–4	Poland
N. Bennett 2', 26'; Taiarui 13', 30' (pen.); Zaveroni 13'	Report(ru)	2', 5' Ziober; 32' Saganowski; 33' (pen.) Klepczarek

Referee: Sergio Filipe Gomes Soares (Portugal)

1 November 2016
17:30

United Arab Emirates	1–11	Brazil
A. Salem 5'	Report(ru)	4', 25' R. da Costa; 8' Bruno Xavier; 9', 15', 20' Catarino da Silva; 19' Datinha; 20' Valença; 23', 30' Mauricinho; 28' Bokinha

Referee: Suhaimi Mat Hassan (Malaysia)

2 November 2016
16:15

United Arab Emirates	3–7	Tahiti
Sulaiman 13'; A. Alblooshi 21'; M. Al Zaabi 36'	Report(ru)	5', 12', 24' Tepa; 10' Taiarui; 15' N. Bennett; 16' Tavanae; 20' Zaveroni

Referee: Bakhtiyor Namazov (Uzbekistan)

2 November 2016
17:30

Brazil	5–2	Poland
Bruno Xavier 14'; Datinha 22'; Bokinha 23', 28' (pen.) da Costa 25'	Report(ru)	4' Madani; 15' Kubiak

Referee: Turki Al Salehi (Oman)

3 November 2016
17:30

Poland	2–2	United Arab Emirates
A. Salem 4' (o.g.); Kubiak 26'	Report(ru)	6' A. Alblooshi; 32' M. Al Zaabi
Penalties
Saganowski (penalty missed); Labedzki (penalty scored); Gac (penalty scored)	2–0	(penalty missed) W. Salem; (penalty missed) M. Al Zaabi

Referee: Eduards Borisevics (Latvia)

3 November 2016
18:45

Tahiti	4–10	Brazil
Zaveroni 14', 24'; Mesh 17' (pen.); Tepa 23'	Report(ru)	1', 20', 21', 24' Bruno Xavier; 10' Datinha; 26', 31' Maurusinho; 30', 36' Lucão; 35' Lima

Referee: Sergio Filipe Gomes Soares (Portugal)

=== Group B ===
Team	Pld	W	W+	L	GF	GA	+/-	Pts
Iran	3	2	1	0	13	6	+7	7
Russia	3	2	0	1	22	12	+10	6
Egypt	3	1	0	2	12	17	–5	3
United States	3	0	0	3	8	20	–12	0

1 November 2016
18:45

United States	2–6	Iran
Perera 1', 9'	Report(ru)	5' Mokhtari; 8' Mesigar; 9', 24' Ahmadzadeh; 26' Kiani; 33' Nazem

Attendance: 450
Referee: Ebrahim Almansory (United Arab Emirates)

1 November 2016
20:00

Russia	10–6	Egypt
Nikonorov 2', 23', 27' (pen.); Krasheninnikov 3'; Shishin 12', 29'; Makarov 14', 18'; Leonov 25' (pen.); Peremitin 28'	Report(ru)	3' E. Elsayed; 12', 29' Hassan; 25' K. Elsayed; 27' Abdelsamie; 30' M. Ali

Attendance: 380
Referee: Eduards Borisevics (Latvia)

2 November 2016
18:45

Egypt	1–4	Iran
M. Abdelnaby 15'	Report(ru)	1', 9' (pen.) Ahmadzadeh; 2', 14' Mesigar

Attendance: 700
Referee: Laurynas Arzuolaitis (Lithuania)

2 November 2016
20:00

Russia	9–3	United States
Paporotnyi 6', 27', 28'; Nikonorov 10', 24'; Makarov 14', 19', 21'; Peremitin 16'	Report(ru)	4', 35' T. Canale; 12' Perera

Attendance: 550
Referee: Ahmad Salasmy (United Arab Emirates)

3 November 2016
16:15

United States	3–5	Egypt
Perera 10' (pen.), 16', 34'	Report(ru)	2', 11' Mostafa; 18' M. Ali; 24' Shaaban; 36' M. Abdelnaby

Attendance: 200
Referee: Ahmad Salasmy (United Arab Emirates)

3 November 2016
20:00

Iran	3–3	Russia
Mesigar 2'; Boloukbashi 4'; Kiani 19'	Report(ru)	2', 19' Peremitin; 36' Makarov
Penalties
Nazem (penalty scored); Mokhtari (penalty scored); Ahmadzadeh (penalty scored)	3–1	(penalty missed) Paporotnyi; (penalty scored) Shishin

Attendance: 2,300

== Classification stage ==
5–8 places
4 November – Jumeirah Beach
Poland	6
United States	3
4 November – Jumeirah Beach
Egypt	7
UAE	3

Fifth place
5 November – Jumeirah Beach
Poland (p)	3 (2)
Egypt	3 (0)
Seventh place
5 November – Jumeirah Beach
United States	3
UAE	4

=== 5–8 places ===
4 November 2016
16:15

Poland	6–3	United States
Saganowski 15', 31'; Ziober 20'; Madani 28'; Esinovski 33'; Dept 36'	Report(ru)	13' Futagaki; 21' Valentine; 36' Feld

Jumeirah Beach, Dubai

4 November 2016
17:30

Egypt	7–3	United Arab Emirates
	Report(ru)

Jumeirah Beach, Dubai

=== Seventh place match ===
5 November 2016
17:30

United States	3–4	United Arab Emirates
	Report(ru)

Jumeirah Beach, Dubai

=== Fifth place match ===
5 November 2016
16:15

Poland	3–3	Egypt
	Report(ru)
Penalties
	2–0

Jumeirah Beach, Dubai

== Championship stage ==
Semi-finals
4 November – Jumeirah Beach
Brazil	7
Russia	0
4 November – Jumeirah Beach
Iran	8
Tahiti	6

Final
5 November – Jumeirah Beach
Brazil	6
Iran	2
Third place
5 November – Jumeirah Beach
Russia	4
Tahiti	3

=== Semi-finals ===
4 November 2016
18:45

Brazil	7–0	Russia
	Report(ru)

Jumeirah Beach, Dubai
Attendance: 2,500

4 November 2016
20:00

Iran	8–6	Tahiti
Mesigar 9', 27'; Ahmadzadeh 16'; Akbari 21', 34', 36'; Boloukbashi 27', 32'	Report(ru)	15' N. Bennett; 19' Zaveroni; 23' Tepa; 26' Li Fung Kuee; 27' R. Bennett; 32' (pen.) Taiarui

Jumeirah Beach, Dubai
Attendance: 3,000

=== Third place match ===
5 November 2016
18:45

Russia	4–3	Tahiti
	Report(ru)

Jumeirah Beach, Dubai
Attendance: 1,900

=== Final ===
5 November 2016
20:00

Brazil	6–2	Iran
	Report(ru)

Jumeirah Beach, Dubai
Attendance: 4,000

== Final standings ==
Rank	Team
1	Brazil
2	Iran
3	Russia
4	Tahiti
5	Poland
6	Egypt
7	UAE
8	United States

== Goalscorers ==
8 goals

- (Brazil) Bruno Xavier

7 goals

- (Brazil) Mauricinho
- (Iran) Mesigar

6 goals

- (Brazil) Bokinha
- (Iran) Ahmadzadeh
- (Russia) Makarov
- (Russia) Nikonorov
- (United States) Perera

5 goals

- (Brazil) Catarino da Silva
- (French Polynesia) N. Bennett
- (French Polynesia) Tepa
- (French Polynesia) Zaveroni
- (United Arab Emirates) A. Alblooshi

4 goals

- (Brazil) R. da Costa
- (Russia) Paporotnyi
- (Russia) Peremitin
- (French Polynesia) Taiarui
- (Poland) Saganowski
- (Egypt) Hassan
- (Egypt) Shaaban
- (United States) Canale

3 goals

- (Brazil) Datinha
- (Brazil) Lima
- (Iran) Akbari
- (Iran) Boloukbashi
- (Poland) Kubiak
- (Poland) Ziober
- (Egypt) M. Abdelnaby
- (Egypt) Mostafa

2 goals

- (Brazil) Lucão
- (Iran) Kiani
- (Russia) Krasheninnikov
- (Russia) Leonov
- (Russia) Shishin
- (Poland) Madani
- (Egypt) M. Ali
- (Egypt) E. Elsayed
- (United Arab Emirates) M. Al Zaabi
- (United Arab Emirates) Khalaf
- (United Arab Emirates) W. Salem

1 goal

- (Brazil) Valença
- (Iran) Mokhtari
- (Iran) Nazem
- (French Polynesia) Mesh
- (French Polynesia) Li Fung kuee
- (French Polynesia) Tavanae
- (French Polynesia) Torokhov
- (French Polynesia) R. Bennett
- (Poland) Dept
- (Poland) Esinovski
- (Poland) Gak
- (Poland) Klepczarek
- (Egypt) Abdelsamie
- (Egypt) Fawzi
- (Egypt) K. Elsayed
- (United Arab Emirates) A. Salem
- (United Arab Emirates) Sulaiman
- (United States) Feld
- (United States) Futagaki
- (United States) Gil
- (United States) Valentine

own goals

- (Russia) Paporotnyi (against Tahiti)
- (United Arab Emirates) A. Salem (against Poland)
- (United Arab Emirates) Sulaiman (against Egypt)

== Broadcasting ==
- (United Arab Emirates) Dubai Sports TV
