= 2019 FIFA Beach Soccer World Cup qualification (UEFA) =

2019 FIFA Beach Soccer World Cup Qualification (UEFA)
FIFA Beach Soccer World Cup Qualifier - Europe - Moscow 2019

Tournament details
- Host country: Russia
- City: Moscow
- Dates: 19–27 July 2019
- Teams: 20^{[§]} (from 1 confederation)
- Venue: 1 (in 1 host city)

Final positions
- Champions: Russia (2nd title)
- Runners-up: Italy
- Third place: Belarus
- Fourth place: Switzerland

Tournament statistics
- Matches played: 51
- Goals scored: 415 (8.14 per match)
- Top scorer: (Italy) Gabriele Gori (14 goals)
- Best player: (Russia) Yuri Krasheninnikov
- Best goalkeeper: (Russia) Maxim Chuzhkov

The 2019 FIFA Beach Soccer World Cup qualifiers for UEFA was a beach soccer tournament contested by European men's national teams who are members of UEFA that determined the five nations from Europe that qualified to the 2019 FIFA Beach Soccer World Cup in Paraguay.

The event, organised by Beach Soccer Worldwide (BSWW) in cooperation with local entities, the Russian Football Union (RFU), Russian Ministry of Sport (RMoS) and the Government of Moscow, took place in Moscow, Russia from 19–27 July 2019. This also marked the first edition of the event to officially be under the patronage of UEFA, including the confederation's financial support.

The tournament was a multi-stage competition, consisting of a first group stage, knockout round, second group stage and finishing with placement matches.

Poland were the defending champions but were eliminated from title-winning contention in the second group stage, ultimately finishing seventh. The competition was won by hosts Russia who, along with Italy, Belarus, Switzerland and Portugal, earned qualification to the World Cup by finishing in the top five (with the Belarusian team notably qualifying for the first time).

== Format ==
The tournament started with a round-robin group stage; the top nations from each group advanced to the round of 16. The eight winners of the round of 16 then advanced to the second round-robin group stage. The top two teams of each group (total of four nations) secured qualification to the World Cup; the winners of each group also advanced to the tournament final to contest the title; the nations finishing in second through fourth played in consolation matches to decide third through eighth place, with the team claiming fifth place also qualifying for the World Cup finals.

The format received criticism, being called the "softest" configuration in the history of UEFA qualifiers, "forgiving the mistakes of teams again and again", that in theory, a team could qualify for the World Cup despite winning just two and yet losing six matches.

== Teams ==
20 teams entered, a figure markedly lower than in recent editions. They are listed below.

Some notable absentees included England, Romania and Greece (all ranked in the European top 20, present at all previous qualifiers) and the Netherlands who qualified to the World Cup via this event in 2013.

- Azerbaijan
- Belarus
- Czech Republic
- Estonia
- France
- Germany
- Hungary
- Italy
- Kazakhstan
- Latvia
- Lithuania
- Moldova
- Norway
- Poland
- Portugal
- Russia
- Spain
- Switzerland
- Turkey
- Ukraine^{[§]}

== Venue ==
Location of Moscow in Russia and Europe

One venue was used in the city of Moscow, Russia.

- All matches took place at a purpose built arena at the Festival Square area of the Luzhniki Olympic Complex in Khamovniki District, with a seating capacity of 3,500.

== Draw ==
The draw to split the 20 teams into five groups of four was conducted by BSWW at the Marriott Hotel in Minsk, Belarus at 10:30 FET on 29 June.

Initially, all the teams were ordered according to their BSWW World Ranking. The top five teams (incl. the hosts) were seeded and each respectively assigned to position one of one of the groups. The remaining fifteen teams were then split into three pots of five according to their world ranking, with the highest placed in Pot 1 down to the lowest placed in Pot 3.

From each pot, the first team drawn was placed into Group A, the second team drawn placed into Group B and so on. Pot 1 teams were placed in position two, Pot 2 teams in position three and so on.

The composition of the seeds and pots is shown below:

Seeds	Pot 1	Pot 2	Pot 3
Russia (3) (hosts; assigned to A1); Portugal (2) (assigned to B1); Italy (6) (assigned to C1); Spain (7) (assigned to D1); Switzerland (9) (assigned to E1)	Ukraine (19); Poland (24); Belarus (29); France (32); Germany (33)	Czech Republic (34); Hungary (35); Azerbaijan (36); Turkey (40); Norway (47)	Estonia (49); Kazakhstan (51); Moldova (54); Lithuania (59); Latvia (91)

== First group stage ==
Each team earns three points for a win in regulation time, two points for a win in extra time, one point for a win in a penalty shoot-out, and no points for a defeat. The top three nations and best fourth placed nation from each group advances to the round of 16.

The competition format was announced on 16 April when up to 32 teams were expected to participate. Despite only 20 teams ultimately entering, BSWW decided not to change the format. With Ukraine's withdrawal, this means just three teams were eliminated at this stage.

All times are local, MSK (UTC+3).

=== Group A ===
Pos	Team	Pld	W	W+	WP	L	GF	GA	GD	Pts	Qualification
1	Russia (H)	3	3	0	0	0	18	5	+13	9	Advance to Round of 16
2	Hungary	3	1	1	0	1	6	8	−2	5	Advance to Round of 16
3	Germany	3	1	0	0	2	9	12	−3	3	Advance to Round of 16
4	Estonia	3	0	0	0	3	6	14	−8	0	

Source: BSWW
(H) Host
19 July 2019
14:45

Hungary	2–1 (a.e.t.)	Estonia
Fekete 5'; Rutai 38'	Report(ru)	25' Stüf

Referee: Ingilab Mammadov (Azerbaijan)
19 July 2019
20:30

Russia	6–2	Germany
Chuzhkov 2'; Nikonorov 4', 15' (pen.), 31'; Romanov 22'; Paporotnyi 25'	Report(ru)	11' Biermann; 34' Körner

Referee: Lukasz Ostrowski (Poland)

20 July 2019
14:45

Germany	2–3	Hungary
Biermann 13', 35'	Report(ru)	4', 27' Fekete; 5' Bartha

Referee: Antonio Pereyra Almeida (Portugal)
20 July 2019
20:00

Estonia	2–7	Russia
Lepik 34'; Munskind 34'	Report(ru)	2' N. Kryshanov; 2', 15' Zemskov; 5' Makarov; 6' Krasheninnikov; 7' Paporotnyi; 34' Shishin

Referee: Gionni Matticoli (Italy)

21 July 2019
12:45

Germany	5–3	Estonia
Biermann 6', 19', 19', 36'; Kniller 8'	Report(ru)	20', 36' Lepik; 34' Sooaluste

Referee: Laurynas Aržuolaitis (Lithuania)
21 July 2019
16:45

Russia	5–1	Hungary
Romanov 2', 7'; Chuzhkov 14'; Nikonorov 21'; Shishin 31'	Report(ru)	22' Genczler

Referee: Özcan Sultanoğlu (Turkey)

=== Group B ===
Pos	Team	Pld	W	W+	WP	L	GF	GA	GD	Pts	Qualification
1	Portugal	3	3	0	0	0	28	5	+23	9	Advance to Round of 16
2	France	3	2	0	0	1	12	7	+5	6	Advance to Round of 16
3	Moldova	3	0	1	0	2	7	20	−13	2	Advance to Round of 16
4	Norway	3	0	0	0	3	4	19	−15	0	

Source: BSWW
19 July 2019
13:30

France	5–2	Norway
Angeletti 9'; Salveson 10' (o.g.); Basquaise 27'; Bru 29' (pen.), 34'	Report(ru)	12' Li; 13' Sandsor

Referee: Viktor Listratov (Russia)
19 July 2019
18:45

Moldova	3–13	Portugal
Ignat 11'; Florea 15'; Eremia 25'	Report(ru)	3', 36' Jordan; 7', 15' Madjer; 9', 24', 35' Belchior; 14', 26' Goncalves; 30', 36' Leo Martins; 33' Rui Coimbra; 35' (o.g.) Eremia

Referee: Roman Borisov (Russia)

20 July 2019
13:30

France	6–2	Moldova
Angeletti 3'; Soares 8'; LeBlanc 19'; Wallon 22'; Bru 25', 31'	Report(ru)	11' Țelic; 32' Capsamun

Referee: Özcan Sultanoğlu (Turkey)
20 July 2019
18:45

Portugal	12–1	Norway
Brilhante 2', 25'; Lourenço 4', 35' (pen.); Leo Martins 8', 20', 22'; Madjer 17', 30'; Rui Coimbra 20'; Jordan 32', 33'	Report(ru)	35' Li

Referee: Torsten Günther (Germany)

22 July 2019
14:45

Norway	1–2 (a.e.t.)	Moldova
Li 24'	Report(ru)	10', 37' Capsamun

Referee: Roman Borisov (Russia)
22 July 2019
20:00

Portugal	3–1	France
Belchior 12'; Madjer 19'; Andrade 26'	Report(ru)	9' Angeletti

Referee: Eduards Borisevics (Latvia)

=== Group C ===
Pos	Team	Pld	W	W+	WP	L	GF	GA	GD	Pts	Qualification
1	Italy	3	3	0	0	0	19	4	+15	9	Advance to Round of 16
2	Poland	3	2	0	0	1	7	8	−1	6	Advance to Round of 16
3	Kazakhstan	3	1	0	0	2	7	10	−3	3	Advance to Round of 16
4	Czech Republic	3	0	0	0	3	5	16	−11	0	

Source: BSWW
19 July 2019
12:15

Poland	3–2	Czech Republic
Madani 12'; Klepczarek 20'; Jesionowski 36'	Report(ru)	27' Huráb; 36' Valeš

Referee: Ago Kärtmann (Estonia)
19 July 2019
17:30

Kazakhstan	2–5	Italy
Demeshko 12'; Azhikenov 21'	Report(ru)	17' Chiavaro; 24' Zurlo; 26', 33' Gori; 27' Ramacciotti

Referee: Eduards Borisevics (Latvia)

20 July 2019
12:15

Poland	3–2	Kazakhstan
Madani 5', 23'; Poźniak 23'	Report(ru)	13' Muralinov; 13' Demeshko

Referee: Viktor Listratov (Russia)
20 July 2019
17:30

Italy	10–1	Czech Republic
Zurlo 5', 35'; Corosiniti 7'; Gori 9', 9' (pen.), 20', 20'; Palmacci 16'; Chiavaro 22'; Körtvélyeši 28' (o.g.)	Report(ru)	31' Valeš

Referee: Raul Martin Gonzalez Frances (Spain)

22 July 2019
13:30

Czech Republic	2–3	Kazakhstan
Huráb 12'; Körtvélyeši 27'	Report(ru)	7' Abylay; 22', 35' Muralinov

Referee: Vasif Mamedov (Russia)
22 July 2019
18:45

Italy	4–1	Poland
Corosiniti 19'; Palmacci 20', 25'; Racciotti 29'	Report(ru)	25' Poźniak

Referee: Vitalij Gomolko (Lithuania)

=== Group D ===
Pos	Team	Pld	W	W+	WP	L	GF	GA	GD	Pts	Qualification
1	Spain	2	2	0	0	0	18	7	+11	6	Advance to Round of 16
2	Azerbaijan	2	1	0	0	1	8	11	−3	3	Advance to Round of 16
3	Latvia	2	0	0	0	2	3	11	−8	0	Advance to Round of 16
–	Ukraine (Note: Ukraine's withdrawal was announced by BSWW on 17 July after the Ministry of Youth and Sports of Ukraine and Ukrainian Association of Football (UAF) decided not to sanction the team's participation in the tournament. No official reason was disclosed; a number of media outlets reported the decision as part of a wider sporting boycott of Russia by the Ukrainian government due to the Russo-Ukrainian war. BSWW announced they would investigate the possibility of taking disciplinary action against the UAF due to Ukraine's late withdrawal, after the conclusion of the event.)	0	–	–	–	–	–	–	—	0	Withdrew

Source: BSWW
Notes:
19 July 2019
11:00

Ukraine	Cancelled	Azerbaijan

19 July 2019
16:15

Spain	8–2	Latvia
Chintas 2'; Paredes 5'; Antonio 6'; Eduard 13'; Llorenç 13'; Chiki 30'; Adrian 31'; Javi T. 34'	Report(ru)	28' Jakovļevs; 34' Rimkus

Referee: Denis Smolyaninov (Russia)

21 July 2019
11:30

Ukraine	Cancelled	Latvia

21 July 2019
15:30

Spain	10–5	Azerbaijan
Llorenç 5', 19' (pen.); Adrian 6'; Eduard 7', 10'; Antonio 8', 33'; Javi T. 9', 13', 26'	Report(ru)	8', 8' Bakshaliyev; 18' Nazarov; 30' (pen.), 31' Allahguliyev

Referee: Sofien Benchabane (France)

22 July 2019
12:15

Latvia	1–3	Azerbaijan
Rubenis 3'	Report(ru)	3', 25' Allahguliyev; 26' Nazarov

Referee: Csaba Baghy (Hungary)
22 July 2019
17:30

Spain	Cancelled	Ukraine

=== Group E ===
Pos	Team	Pld	W	W+	WP	L	GF	GA	GD	Pts	Qualification
1	Switzerland	3	2	0	0	1	14	5	+9	6	Advance to Round of 16
2	Belarus	3	1	0	2	0	11	8	+3	5	Advance to Round of 16
3	Lithuania	3	1	0	0	2	6	11	−5	3	Advance to Round of 16
4	Turkey	3	0	0	0	3	5	12	−7	0	Advance to Round of 16

Source: BSWW
20 July 2019
11:00

Belarus	6–3	Turkey
Piatrouski 3', 5', 10'; Hapon 5', 29'; Bokach 21'	Report(ru)	16' Türkmen; 29' Süer; 30' Terzioglu

Referee: Csaba Baghy (Hungary)
20 July 2019
16:15

Lithuania	1–8	Switzerland
Radavicius 21'	Report(ru)	8' (pen.), 23', 32' Borer; 14' Mo; 18' (pen.), 21' Hodel; 19', 24' Stankovic

Referee: Atila Balint (Romania)

21 July 2019
10:15

Belarus	3–3 (a.e.t.)	Lithuania
Samsonov 2', 26'; Mahalteski 2'	Report(ru)	31', 34' Plytnikas; 35' Meskinis
Penalties
Savich (penalty scored); Samsonov (penalty scored)	2–0	(penalty missed) Meskinis; (penalty missed) Radavicius

Referee: Sergio Gomes Soares (Portugal)
21 July 2019
14:15

Switzerland	4–2	Turkey
Borer 3', 13'; Ostgen 18'; Steinemann 20'	Report(ru)	8' (o.g.) Mo; 9' Terzioglu

Referee: Lukasz Ostrowski (Poland)

22 July 2019
11:00

Turkey	0–2	Lithuania
	Report(ru)	23' Makutunovicius; 33' Plytnikas

Referee: Saverio Bottalico (Italy)
22 July 2019
16:15

Switzerland	2–2 (a.e.t.)	Belarus
Hodel 3', 6'	Report(ru)	9' Ryabko; 29' Piatrouski
Penalties
Hodel (penalty scored); Mo (penalty missed); Stankovic (penalty scored)	2–3	(penalty scored) Savich; (penalty scored) Samsonov; (penalty scored) Chaikouski

Referee: Raul Martin Gonzalez Frances (Spain)

=== Ranking of fourth-placed teams ===
Pos	Grp	Team	Pld	W	W+	WP	L	GF	GA	GD	Pts	Qualification
1	E	Turkey	3	0	0	0	3	5	12	−7	0	Advance to Round of 16
2	A	Estonia	3	0	0	0	3	6	14	−8	0	
3	C	Czech Republic	3	0	0	0	3	5	16	−11	0	
4	B	Norway	3	0	0	0	3	4	19	−15	0	

Source: BSWW

== Round of 16 ==
The round of 16 ties are contested as single elimination matches. The eight winners progress to the second group stage.

=== Draw ===
==== Procedure ====
The draw took place at press centre of the host stadium immediately following the conclusion of the final match of the first group stage.

For the purpose of the draw, the 16 teams were split into four pots of four. The five group winners and three best second placed teams were divided between Pots 1 and 2, based on their BSWW World Ranking, with the highest ranked four placed in Pot 1 and the lowest ranked four in Pot 2. The two worst second placed teams, five third placed and best fourth placed nation were placed in Pots 3 and 4, also divided between pots in the same fashion.

Teams from Pot 1 were drawn against teams from Pot 4, and Pot 2 nations face those from Pot 3. The drawing of ties alternated as such.

===== Ranking of second-placed teams =====
The calculation of best and worst second placed teams was reformulated upon Ukraine's withdrawal, considering the occupants of Group D played just two matches.

Pos	Grp	Team	Pld	W	W+	WP	L	GF	GA	GD	Pts	Qualification
1	B	France	2	1	0	0	1	7	5	+2	3	Pot 1/2
2	C	Poland	2	1	0	0	1	4	6	−2	3	Pot 1/2
3	D	Azerbaijan	2	1	0	0	1	8	11	−3	3	Pot 1/2
4	A	Hungary	2	1	0	0	1	4	7	−3	3	Pot 3/4
5	E	Belarus	2	0	0	2	0	5	5	0	2	Pot 3/4

Source: BSWW

===== Pots =====
The composition of the four pots is shown below.

Pot 1	Pot 2	Pot 3	Pot 4
Portugal (2); Russia (3); Italy (6); Spain (7)	Switzerland (9); Poland (24); France (32); Azerbaijan (36)	Belarus (29); Germany (33); Hungary (35); Turkey (40)	Kazakhstan (51); Moldova (54); Lithuania (59); Latvia (91)

=== Matches ===
Key:
Winners advance to second group stage	Group 1
Winners advance to second group stage	Group 2

23 July 2019
11:00

Azerbaijan	3–3 (a.e.t.)	Hungary
Hajiyev 14'; Bakshaliyev 16'; Allahguliyev 33'	Report(ru)	7' Bartha; 16' Szentes-Biro; 17' Szasz
Penalties
Sultanov (penalty scored); Nazarov (penalty scored)	2–1	(penalty missed) Fekete; (penalty scored) Genczler; (penalty missed) Bartha

Referee: Raul Martin Gonzalez Frances (Spain)
23 July 2019
12:15

Switzerland	8–2	Turkey
Borer 1' (pen.); Ott 8', 19'; Steinemann 9'; Stankovic 12'; Ostgen 15', 16'; Hodel 26'	Report(ru)	19' Terzioglu; 35' Anzaflıoğlu

Referee: Sergio Gomes Soares (Portugal)
23 July 2019
13:30

Poland	3–2 (a.e.t.)	Germany
Baran 5' (pen.); Poźniak 32'; Jesionowski 38'	Report(ru)	28' Biermann; 36' Weirauch

23 July 2019
14:45

France	1–4	Belarus
Soares 28'	Report(ru)	8' Savich; 9' Ryabko; 24', 35' Hapon

Referee: Antonio Pereyra Almeida (Portugal)
23 July 2019
16:15

Italy	12–4	Kazakhstan
Gentilin 7'; Ramacciotti 11'; Gori 18', 21' (pen.), 27'; Palmacci 27', 33', 34'; Frainetti 32'; Sciacca 33'; Marinai 34'	Report(ru)	18' Muralinov; 21' Bogdanov; 21' Makagon; 23' Azhikenov

Referee: Roman Borisov (Russia)
23 July 2019
17:30

Portugal	10–1	Lithuania
Madjer 2', 21' (pen.), 27'; Belchior 6', 17' (pen.); Leo Martins 11'; Goncalves 14'; Rui Coimbra 17'; Lourenço 34'; Brilhante 36'	Report(ru)	22' Plytnikas

Referee: Torsten Günther (German)
23 July 2019
18:45

Spain	14–2	Latvia
Eduard 1', 11' (pen.), 11', 16'; Dona 8', 12', 31'; Antonio 16'; Chiki 17', 27'; Adrian 21'; Acosta 29' (pen.); Llorenç 33', 35'	Report(ru)	7' Rubenis; 15' Jakovļevs

Referee: Viktor Listratov (Russia)
23 July 2019
20:00

Russia	8–0	Moldova
Paporotnyi 2'; Makarov 3'; Shishin 12'; Nikonorov 21', 28'; Zemskov 24', 26', 36'	Report(ru)

Referee: Laurynas Aržuolaitis (Lithuania)

== Second group stage ==
The eight teams are split into two groups of four: the four winners of ties 3–6 of the round of 16 draw enter Group 1, whilst the four winners of ties 1, 2, 7 and 8 enter Group 2.

The teams that finish in the top two of each group earn qualification to the World Cup; those that finish in the corresponding positions of the two groups play against one another to determine the final standings of the tournament. The teams that play in the fifth place play-off will contest the last remaining spot at the World Cup.

=== Group 1 ===
Pos	Team	Pld	W	W+	WP	L	GF	GA	GD	Pts
1	Italy	3	2	0	0	1	10	7	+3	6
2	Belarus	3	1	0	1	1	9	9	0	4
3	Portugal	3	1	0	0	2	13	10	+3	3
4	Poland	3	1	0	0	2	8	14	−6	3

Source: BSWW

Qualification 1	Qualification 2
Advance to Final	Qualified for 2019 World Cup finals
Third place play-off	Qualified for 2019 World Cup finals
Fifth place play-off	Possible 2019 World Cup finals^{[a]}
Seventh place play-off	

{{{1}}}

24 July 2019
16:15

Poland	1–3	Italy
Baran 3'	Report(ru)	7' Del Mestre; 10' Palmacci; 35' Gori

Referee: Raul Martin Gonzalez Frances (Spain)
24 July 2019
17:30

Belarus	3–2	Portugal
Bokach 5'; Kanstantsinaiu 5'; Ryabko 19'	Report(ru)	22', 36' Gonçalves

Referee: Roman Borisov (Russia)

25 July 2019
16:15

Italy	3–3 (a.e.t.)	Belarus
Zurlo 15'; Gori 24'; Marinai 28' (pen.)	Report(ru)	13' Hapon; 34' Samsonov; 36' Savich
Penalties
Chiavaro (penalty scored); Gori (penalty scored); Zurlo (penalty missed)	2–3	(penalty scored) Savich; (penalty scored) Samsonov; (penalty scored) Chaikouski

Referee: Ingilab Mammadov (Azerbaijan)
25 July 2019
17:30

Portugal	8–3	Poland
Rui Coimbra 4'; Brilhante 8'; Leo Martins 10', 24'; Madjer 17'; Gonçalves 19', 21'; Jordan 23'	Report(ru)	1' Gac; 7', 12' Baran

Referee: Laurynas Aržuolaitis (Lithuania)

26 July 2019
16:15

Poland	4–3	Belarus
Jesionowski 22'; Baran 23' (pen.), 35'; Gac 32'	Report(ru)	8' Kanstantsinaiu; 10' Samsonov; 32' Savich

Referee: Eduards Borisevics (Latvia)
26 July 2019
18:45

Portugal	3–4	Italy
Leo Martins 5'; Jordan 8', 36'	Report(ru)	6' (pen.), 27' Gori; 32' Gentilin; 34' Ramacciotti

Referee: Vitalij Gomolko (Lithuania)

=== Group 2 ===
Pos	Team	Pld	W	W+	WP	L	GF	GA	GD	Pts
1	Russia	3	3	0	0	0	18	3	+15	9
2	Switzerland	3	2	0	0	1	15	17	−2	6
3	Spain	3	1	0	0	2	15	12	+3	3
4	Azerbaijan	3	0	0	0	3	5	18	−13	0

Source: BSWW

Qualification 1	Qualification 2
Advance to Final	Qualified for 2019 World Cup finals
Third place play-off	Qualified for 2019 World Cup finals
Fifth place play-off	Possible 2019 World Cup finals^{[a]}
Seventh place play-off	

{{{1}}}

24 July 2019
18:45

Azerbaijan	3–9	Spain
Nazarov 11', 19'; Allahguliyev 16'	Report(ru)	7', 19', 22' Chiky; 21' Adrian; 24' Eduard; 25' Dona; 32', 35', 35' Javi T.

Referee: Sergio Gomes Soares (Portugal)
24 July 2019
20:00

Switzerland	3–9	Russia
Stankovic 14'; Steinemann 27'; Jaeggy 33'	Report(ru)	3', 14', 26' Makarov; 4' Krasheninnikov; 13', 26' Romanov; 16', 22' Paporotnyi; 20' Shishin

Referee: Gionni Matticoli (Italy)

25 July 2019
18:45

Russia	6–0	Azerbaijan
Chuzhkov 3'; Romanov 5'; Shishin 6', 23'; N. Kryshanov 32' (pen.); Nikonorov 34'	Report(ru)

Referee: Sofien Benchabane (France)
25 July 2019
20:00

Spain	6–9	Switzerland
Hernández 1', 18'; Javi T. 11'; Chiky 21'; Eduard 23'; Chintas 29'	Report(ru)	1' Borer; 4', 14' Stankovic; 10' Spaccarotella; 12', 16' Steinemann; 21', 36' Ott

Referee: Vitalij Gomolko (Lithuania)

26 July 2019
17:35

Azerbaijan	2–3	Switzerland
Bakshaliyev 10'; Aliyev 35'	Report(ru)	7' Stankovic; 27' Spaccarotella; 31' (pen.) Borer

Referee: Lukasz Ostrowski (Poland)
26 July 2019
20:00

Russia	6–1	Spain
Chuzhkov 1'; Javi T. 8' (o.g.); Nikonorov 21'; V. Kryshanov 24'; Paporotnyi 24'; Krasheninnikov 28'	Report(ru)	29' (o.g.) Shkarin

Referee: Ago Kärtmann (Estonia)

== Play-offs ==
=== Seventh place play-off ===
27 July 2019
14:45

Poland	13–3	Azerbaijan
Hajiyev 6' (o.g.); Jesionowski 7', 24', 31', 36'; Baran 8', 35', 36'; Kubiak 12', 12', 25' (pen.); Poźniak 23'; Mammadov 34' (o.g.)	Report(ru)	8', 23' Zeynalov; 23' (pen.) Mammadov

Referee: Roman Borisov (Russia)

=== Fifth place play-off ===
Winner qualifies for the 2019 FIFA Beach Soccer World Cup.

27 July 2019
17:15

Portugal	5–5 (a.e.t.)	Spain
Leo Martins 9', 29', 30'; Gonçalves 31'; Rui Coimbra 37'	Report(ru)	5' Chiky; 7' Chintas; 28', 37' Eduard; 30' (o.g.) Leo Martins
Penalties
Madjer (penalty scored); Lourenço (penalty scored)	2–1	(penalty missed) Llorenç; (penalty scored) Eduard; (penalty missed) Chiky

Referee: Gionni Matticoli (Italy)

=== Third place play-off ===
27 July 2019
16:10

Switzerland	2–6	Belarus
Borer 1'; Steinemann 14'	Report(ru)	1', 13' Ryabko; 12' Samsonov; 14' Bokach; 18', 23' Hapon

Referee: Sergio Gomes Soares (Portugal)

=== Final ===
27 July 2019
19:00

Italy	1–7	Russia
Gori 22'	Report(ru)	1' Krasheninnikov; 8' (o.g.) Ramacciotti; 12' Shkarin; 14' Chuzhkov; 18', 27' Zemskov; 21' Paporotnyi

Referee: Raul Martin Gonzalez Frances (Spain)

== Awards ==
=== Winners ===
2019 FIFA Beach Soccer World Cup
qualifiers for UEFA champions

Russia
Second title

=== Individual awards ===
The following awards were given at the conclusion of the tournament.

Most valuable player
(Russia) Yuri Krasheninnikov
Top scorer
(Italy) Gabriele Gori (14 goals)
Best goalkeeper
(Russia) Maxim Chuzhkov

== Top goalscorers ==
Players who scored at least 3 goals are listed

There were 416 goals scored in 51 matches, for an average of 8.16 goals per match.

14 goals

- (Italy) Gabriele Gori

12 goals

- (Portugal) Leo Martins

11 goals

- (Spain) Eduard Suarez

9 goals

- (Poland) Daniel Baran
- (Portugal) Madjer
- (Switzerland) Philipp Borer

8 goals

- (Germany) Christian Biermann
- (Portugal) João Gonçalves
- (Russia) Boris Nikonorov

7 goals

- (Belarus) Aleh Hapon
- (Italy) Paolo Palmacci
- (Poland) Jakub Jesionowski
- (Portugal) Jordan Santos
- (Russia) Artur Paporotnyi
- (Russia) Fedor Zemskov
- (Spain) Salvador Ardil "Chiky"
- (Spain) Javi Torres
- (Switzerland) Dejan Stankovic

6 goals

- (Azerbaijan) Sabir Allahguliyev
- (Poland) Tomasz Poźniak
- (Portugal) Belchior
- (Russia) Dmitry Shishin
- (Spain) Antonio Mayor

5 goals

- (Belarus) Anatoly Ryabko
- (Belarus) Dzianis Samsonov
- (Portugal) Rui Coimbra
- (Russia) Maxim Chuzhkov
- (Russia) Yuri Krasheninnikov
- (Russia) Alexey Makarov
- (Russia) Kirill Romanov
- (Spain) Adrian Frutos
- (Spain) Llorenç Gomez
- (Switzerland) Glenn Hodel
- (Switzerland) Tobias Steinemann

4 goals

- (Azerbaijan) Jomard Bakshaliyev
- (Azerbaijan) Amid Nazarov
- (Belarus) Yury Piatrouski
- (France) Jeremy Bru
- (Italy) Dario Ramacciotti
- (Italy) Emmanuele Zurlo
- (Kazakhstan) Bayanbek Muralinov
- (Lithuania) Audrius Plytnikas
- (Portugal) Ruben Trindade Brilhante
- (Spain) Dona
- (Switzerland) Noel Ott

3 goals

- (Belarus) Vadzim Bokach
- (Belarus) Illia Savich
- (Estonia) Sander Lepik
- (France) Victor Angeletti
- (Hungary) Viktor Fekete
- (Italy) Francesco Corosiniti
- (Moldova) Alexei Capsamun
- (Norway) Pak-ling Li
- (Poland) Konrad Kubiak
- (Poland) Karim Madani
- (Portugal) André Lourenço
- (Spain) Francisco Jose Chintas
- (Switzerland) Jan Ostgen
- (Turkey) Barış Terzioğlu

1 own goal

- (Azerbaijan) Ilkin Hajiyev (playing against Poland)
- (Azerbaijan) Orkhan Mammadov (playing against Poland)
- (Czech Republic) Andy Körtvélyeši (playing against Italy)
- (Italy) Dario Ramacciotti (playing against Russia)
- (Moldova) Eremia Alexandru (playing against Portugal)
- (Norway) Johan Elverum Salveson (playing against France)
- (Portugal) Leo Martins (playing against Spain)
- (Russia) Anton Shkarin (playing against Spain)
- (Spain) Javi Torres (playing against Russia)
- (Switzerland) Mo Jaeggy (playing against Turkey)

Source: Scorers, Own goals

== Final standings ==
Key:
Qualified for the 2019 FIFA Beach Soccer World Cup

Rank	Team
1st place, gold medalist(s)	Russia
2nd place, silver medalist(s)	Italy
3rd place, bronze medalist(s)	Belarus
4	Switzerland
5	Portugal
6	Spain
7	Poland
8	Azerbaijan
9–16	France
9–16	Germany
9–16	Hungary
9–16	Kazakhstan
9–16	Latvia
9–16	Lithuania
9–16	Moldova
9–16	Turkey
17–19	Czech Republic
17–19	Estonia
17–19	Norway
–	Ukraine

=== Qualified teams to the FIFA Beach Soccer World Cup ===
The following five teams from UEFA qualify for the 2019 FIFA Beach Soccer World Cup.

Team	Qualified on	Previous appearances in FIFA Beach Soccer World Cup^{1} only FIFA era (since 2005)
Belarus	25 July 2019	0 (debut)
Italy	26 July 2019	7 (2006, 2007, 2008, 2009, 2011, 2015, 2017)
Russia	26 July 2019	6 (2007, 2008, 2009, **2011**, **2013**, 2015)
Switzerland	26 July 2019	4 (2009, 2011, 2015, 2017)
Portugal	27 July 2019	8 (2005, 2006, 2007, 2008, 2009, 2011, **2015**, 2017)

^{1} Bold indicates champions for that year. Italic indicates hosts for that year.

== Notes ==
§. Ukraine originally entered the competition but withdrew after the draw was conducted.
