= Rodrigo (beach soccer) =

Brazilian beach soccer player

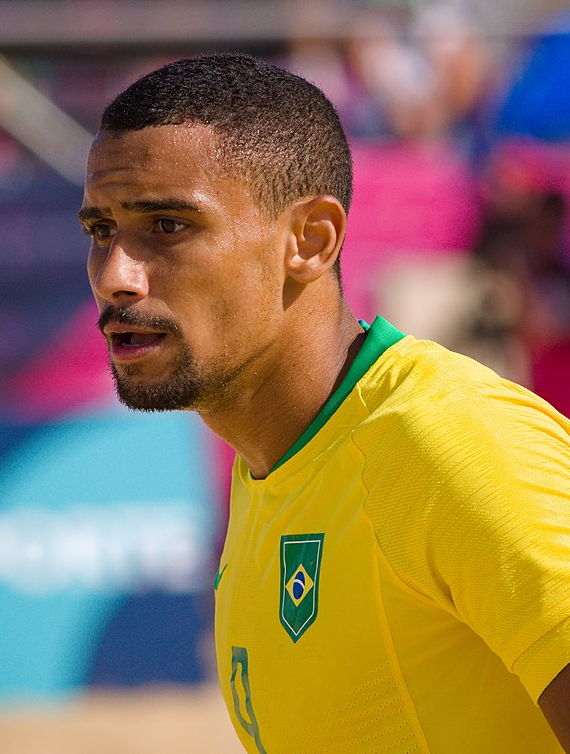
- Rodrigo at the 2019 South American Beach Games.

Personal information
- Full name: Rodrigo Soares da Costa
- Date of birth: 16 August 1993 (age 33)
- Place of birth: Rio de Janeiro, Brazil
- Height: 1.84 m (6 ft 0 in)
- Position: Forward

International career^{‡}
Years	Team	Apps	(Gls)
2014–	Brazil BS	120	(170)
- ‡ National team caps and goals as of 14 January 2024

Rodrigo Soares da Costa (born 16 August 1993), better known simply as Rodrigo, is a Brazilian beach soccer player who plays as a forward. He won the 2017, 2024 and 2025 FIFA Beach Soccer World Cup representing Brazil and claimed the Golden Ball award at the last competition; he has also appeared at three other World Cups (2015, 2019, 2021). Rodrigo now sits inside the top ten of Brazil's all-time top scorers.

Rodrigo is considered one of the world's top players, as recognised at multiple Beach Soccer Stars awards ceremonies.

== Early life ==
Rodrigo was born and raised in a favela in Rio de Janeiro. He grew up playing casual beach soccer on the sands of Copacabana.

== Career ==
Rodrigo grew up playing casual beach soccer on Copacabana beach. He joined his first competitive club, Botafogo, in 2011, aged 18. Three years later in 2014, aged 21, Rodrgio was called up to the Brazilian national team for the first time and was subsequently picked for the 2015 World Cup squad.

He particularly came to prominence in 2016, aged 23, when he won MVP awards in the Russian Superleague and Euro Winners Cup, and won the Rising Star commendation at the Beach Soccer Stars awards ceremony. The next year, he inspired Brazil to their 2017 World Cup victory in the Bahamas, winning the Silver Shoe (second highest scorer) award with nine goals.

In 2017, Rodrigo also joined top Russian club, Kristall. As of 2023, he has scored 251 goals in 176 games for the club in all competitions. By 2026, his totals with Kristall had increased to 220 matches and 322 goals across all competitions. During his tenure with Kristall, Rodrigo contributed to multiple titles, including the Euro Winners Cup in 2020 and 2021, and Russian Superleague championships in 2018, 2019, 2021, 2022, 2023, and 2024.

He cemented his place as one of the world's best players when he was named as one of the world's top three players and part of the team of the year at the 2019 Beach Soccer Stars ceremony. At the 2021 World Cup, Rodrigo made his 100th appearance for Brazil in the group stage loss to Switzerland.

In addition to Kristall, Rodrigo has represented other clubs in various tournaments. He played for CR Flamengo in the Americas Winners Cup in 2024, scoring 11 goals in 6 matches and earning MVP honors. In 2024 and 2025, he competed for Falfala Kafr Qassem BSC in the Euro Winners Cup and World Winners Cup, amassing significant goals including 13 in each of the 2024 and 2025 Euro Winners Cups. He also featured for Sportivo Luqueño in the 2025 Americas Winners Cup, scoring 9 goals in 6 matches.

Rodrigo continued his international success by helping Brazil win the 2024 FIFA Beach Soccer World Cup in Dubai, scoring 6 goals in 5 matches. In the 2025 FIFA Beach Soccer World Cup in Seychelles, he scored 7 goals in 6 matches, earning the Golden Ball as the tournament's best player and the Bronze Shoe as third top scorer, while leading Brazil to their seventh title with a dramatic winning goal in the final against Belarus.

In 2024, Rodrigo was crowned the Best Men's Player in the world at the Beach Soccer Stars awards. He was nominated again for the award in 2024 (for 2024 performance).

== Statistics ==
Note: Some of the sources of these statistics may have counted an appearance when the player was actually an unused substitute.

International

Competition	Year	Apps	Goals	Ref.
FIFA Beach Soccer World Cup	(Portugal) 2015	4	3	
FIFA Beach Soccer World Cup	(The Bahamas) 2017	6	9	
FIFA Beach Soccer World Cup	(Paraguay) 2019	4	6	
FIFA Beach Soccer World Cup	(Russia) 2021	4	5	
FIFA Beach Soccer World Cup	(United Arab Emirates) 2024	5	6	
FIFA Beach Soccer World Cup	(Seychelles) 2025	6	7	
Total		29	36	—

Competition	Year	Apps	Goals	Ref.
Intercontinental Cup	(United Arab Emirates) 2015	4	4	
Intercontinental Cup	(United Arab Emirates) 2016	4	4	
Intercontinental Cup	(United Arab Emirates) 2017	5	7	
Intercontinental Cup	(United Arab Emirates) 2018	4	8	
Total		17	23	—

Competition	Year	Apps	Goals	Ref.
Neom Beach Soccer Cup	(Saudi Arabia) 2023	4	3	
Neom Beach Soccer Cup	(Saudi Arabia) 2024	4	6	
Total		8	9	—

Club

Tournament	Year	Club	Apps	Goals	Ref.
Euro Winners Cup
Euro Winners Cup	(Italy) 2014	(Italy) Catania	6	9	
Euro Winners Cup	(Italy) 2015	(Italy) Catania	7	9	
Euro Winners Cup	(Italy) 2016	(Italy) Catania	7	13	
Euro Winners Cup	(Portugal) 2017	(Russia) Kristall	7	11	
Euro Winners Cup	(Portugal) 2018	(Russia) Kristall	6	2	
Euro Winners Cup	(Portugal) 2019	(Russia) Kristall	8	13	
Euro Winners Cup	(Portugal) 2020	(Russia) Kristall	6	9	
Euro Winners Cup	(Portugal) 2021	(Russia) Kristall	8	9	
Euro Winners Cup	(Portugal) 2024	(Israel) Falfala Kafr Qassem	7	13	
Euro Winners Cup	(Portugal) 2025	(Israel) Falfala Kafr Qassem	7	13	
Total			69	101	—

Tournament	Year	Club	Apps	Goals	Ref.
Americas Winners Cup
Americas Winners Cup	(El Salvador) 2024	(Brazil) CR Flamengo	6	11	
(El Salvador) 2025	(Paraguay) Sportivo Luqueño	6	9		
Total			12	20	—

== Honours ==
As of 2025.

The following is a selection, not an exhaustive list, of the major honours Rodrigo has achieved:

=== International ===
- FIFA Beach Soccer World Cup
  - Winner (3): 2017, 2024, 2025
- World Beach Games
  - Winner (1): 2019
- Intercontinental Cup
  - Winner (3): 2014, 2016, 2017
- Neom Beach Soccer Cup
  - Winner (2): 2023, 2024
- CONMEBOL qualifiers for the FIFA Beach Soccer World Cup
  - Winner (3): 2015, 2017, 2019
- Copa América
  - Winner (2): 2016, 2018
- Mundialito
  - Winner (2): 2017, 2023
- South American Beach Games
  - Winner (1): 2019
- South American Beach Soccer League
  - Winner (4): 2017, 2018, 2019, 2022
- CONMEBOL Liga Evolución Beach Soccer
  - Winner (1): 2026

=== Club ===
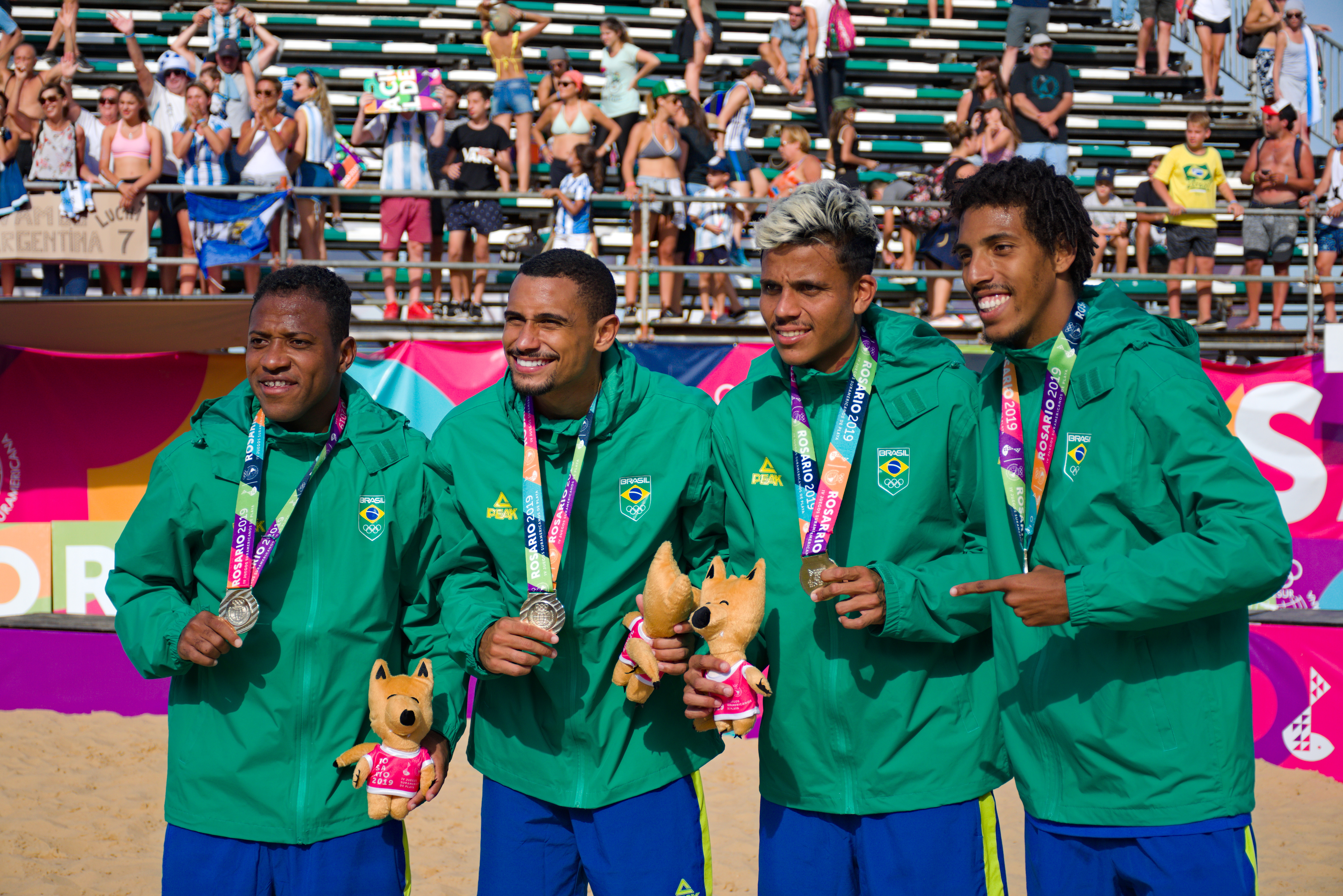
Rodrigo (second from left) at the medals ceremony of the 2019 South American Beach Games.

- Euro Winners Cup
  - Winner (2): 2020, 2021
- Russian Superleague
  - Winner (6): 2018, 2019, 2021, 2022, 2023, 2024
- Russian Cup
  - Winner (7): 2017, 2018, 2019, 2020, 2021, 2022, 2023
- Russian Super Cup
  - Winner (1): 2024
- Americas Winners Cup
  - Winner (1): 2024 (with Flamengo)

=== Individual ===
- FIFA Beach Soccer World Cup (3):
  - Golden Ball: 2025
  - Silver Shoe: 2017
  - Bronze Shoe: 2025
- Beach Soccer Stars (4):
  - Rising Star: 2016
  - World's top 3 best players: 2019
  - World dream team: 2019
  - Best Men's Player: 2023
- Intercontinental Cup (2):
  - Best player: 2017, 2018
- CONMEBOL qualifiers for the FIFA Beach Soccer World Cup (1):
  - Top scorer: 2019
- Copa América (1):
  - Best player: 2018
- Mundialito (4):
  - Best player: 2017, 2023
  - Top scorer: 2017, 2023
- Euro Winners Cup (1):
  - Best player: 2016
- Russian Superleague (3):
  - Best player: 2017
  - Top scorer: 2017, 2019
- Americas Winners Cup (1):
  - MVP: 2024
