= 2011 Beach Soccer Intercontinental Cup =

Tournament details
- Host country: United Arab Emirates
- Dates: 22–26 November 2011
- Teams: 8 (from 6 confederations)
- Venue: 1 (in 1 host city)

Final positions
- Champions: Russia (1st title)
- Runners-up: Brazil
- Third place: Switzerland
- Fourth place: United Arab Emirates

Tournament statistics
- Matches played: 16
- Goals scored: 118 (7.38 per match)
- Top scorer: SUI Dejan Stankovic (12 goals)
- Best player: SUI Dejan Stankovic
- Best goalkeeper: BRA Mão

The 2011 Beach Soccer Intercontinental Cup was the first edition of the new tournament, Beach Soccer Intercontinental Cup. It took place at Jumeirah Beach in Dubai, United Arab Emirates from 22 to 26 November 2011. Eight teams participated in the competition.

== Participating teams ==
Team	Confederation	Achievements	Participation
United Arab Emirates	AFC	Host	1st
Russia	UEFA	2011 FIFA Beach Soccer World Cup winners	1st
Mexico	CONCACAF	2011 FIFA Beach Soccer WCQ (CONCACAF) winners	1st
Brazil	CONMEBOL	2011 FIFA Beach Soccer WCQ (CONMEBOL) winners	1st
Oman	AFC	2011 FIFA Beach Soccer WCQ (AFC) runners-up	1st
Nigeria	CAF	2011 FIFA Beach Soccer WCQ (CAF) runners-up	1st
Switzerland	UEFA	2011 Euro Beach Soccer League runners-up	1st
Tahiti	OFC	2011 FIFA Beach Soccer WCQ (OFC) winners	1st

== Group stage ==
All matches are listed as local time in Dubai, (UTC+4)

Legend
Teams that advanced to the semi-finals

=== Group A ===
Team	Pld	W	W+	L	GF	GA	+/-	Pts
Russia	3	3	0	0	22	5	+17	9
United Arab Emirates	3	2	0	1	9	11	−2	6
Nigeria	3	1	0	2	9	12	−3	3
Tahiti	3	0	0	3	7	19	−12	0

22 November 2011
17:45

Russia	8–1	Nigeria
Eremeev (2), Gorchinsky, Shaykov, Makarov, Peremitin, Shishin, Krash		Tale

Jumeirah Beach, Dubai

22 November 2011
20:15

United Arab Emirates	6–2	Tahiti
R.Ahmad (2), Rami (2), Yousif, Adel		Naea Bennet, Vero

Jumeirah Beach, Dubai

23 November 2011
17:45

Russia	7–4	Tahiti
Shaykov (2), Shishin (2), Gorchinskiy, Eremeev, Krash		Tehau, Benne, Amau, Li Fung Kwee

Jumeirah Beach, Dubai

23 November 2011
20:15

Nigeria	2–3	United Arab Emirates
Emeka, Tale		Yousif (2), Humaid

Jumeirah Beach, Dubai

24 November 2011
17:45

Tahiti	1–7	Nigeria
Bennet		Olawale (4), Tale (2), Emeka

Jumeirah Beach, Dubai

24 November 2011
20:15

United Arab Emirates	0–7	Russia
		Shaykov (2), Krash (2), Leonov, Eremeev, Gorchinskiy

Jumeirah Beach, Dubai

=== Group B ===
Team	Pld	W	W+	L	GF	GA	+/-	Pts
Brazil	3	2	1	0	14	8	+6	8
Switzerland	3	2	0	1	16	9	+7	6
Mexico	3	1	0	2	8	11	−3	3
Oman	3	0	0	3	6	16	−10	0

22 November 2011
16:30

Mexico	3–4	Switzerland
Cervantes (2), H. Lopez		Meier (2), Lutz, Stankovic

Jumeirah Beach, Dubai

22 November 2011
19:00

Brazil	5–2	Oman
Bruno Xavier (2), Sidney, Betinho, Andre		Hani (2)

Jumeirah Beach, Dubai

23 November 2011
16:30

Oman	2–8	Switzerland
Khalid (2)		Stankovic (3), Spacca, Meier, Schirinzi, Borer, Ziegler

Jumeirah Beach, Dubai

23 November 2011
19:00

Brazil	5–2	Mexico
Andre (2), Dino, Bruno Xavier, Fernando DDI		Cervantes, Villalobo

Jumeirah Beach, Dubai

24 November 2011
16:30

Oman	2–3	Mexico
Is’haq (2)		Cervantes, Cati C., Flores

Jumeirah Beach, Dubai

24 November 2011
19:00

Switzerland	4–4 (a.e.t.)	Brazil
Stankovic (2), Borer, Samuel		Andre (3), Bruno Xavie
Penalties
(penalty scored) Stankovic; (penalty missed) Meier	1–2	(penalty scored) Bruno Xavier; (penalty scored) Andre

Jumeirah Beach, Dubai

== Knockout stage ==
Semi-finals
25 November - Jumeira
Russia (pen.)	4 (2)
Switzerland	4 (1)
25 November - Jumeira
Brazil	2
United Arab Emirates	0

Final
26 November - Jumeira
Russia (aet)	5
Brazil	4
Third place
26 November - Jumeira
Switzerland (pen.)	4 (1)
United Arab Emirates	4 (0)

=== Semi-finals ===
25 November 2011
20:15

Russia	4–4 (a.e.t.)	Switzerland
Shishin (2), Leonov, Makarov		Stankovic (4)
Penalties
(penalty scored) Leonov; (penalty scored) Shishin	2–1	(penalty scored) Stankovic; (penalty missed) Borer

Jumeira Beach, Dubai

25 November 2011
19:00

Brazil	2–0	United Arab Emirates
Sidney, Anderson

Jumeira Beach, Dubai

=== Third place play-off ===
26 November 2011
19:00

Switzerland	4–4	United Arab Emirates
Stankovic (2), Ziegler, Borer		Karim (3), Rami
Penalties
	1–0

Jumeira Beach, Dubai

=== Final ===
26 November 2011
20:15

Russia	5–4 (a.e.t.)	Brazil
Shishin (3), Shaykov, Leonov		Fernando Ddi (2), Anderson, Jorginho

Jumeira Beach, Dubai

== Final standings ==
Rank	Team
1	Russia
2	Brazil
3	Switzerland
4	United Arab Emirates
5	Nigeria
6	Mexico
7	Oman
8	Tahiti
