= United Arab Emirates national beach soccer team =

United Arab Emirates
- Nickname: Eyal Zayed
- Association: UAEFA
- Confederation: AFC (Asia)
- Head coach: Mohamed Bashir Al Maazmi
- Most caps: Humaid Jamal Shambih Bilal Alblooshi (62)
- Top scorer: Waleed Beshr Mohammed Beshr Salem (29)
- FIFA code: UAE
- BSWW ranking: 11 (2 September 2026)
First colours
Second colours

First international
- UAE 3–7 France (Dubai, UAE; 18 April 2001)

Biggest win
- Qatar 1–8 UAE (Kuala Terengganu, Malaysia; 7 March 2017); UAE 8–1 Malaysia (Pattaya, Thailand; 14 March 2019)

Biggest defeat
- UAE 4–15 Brazil (Dubai, UAE; 2 November 2017)

The United Arab Emirates national beach soccer team represents United Arab Emirates in beach soccer. They are one of the most successful Asian national teams, having won twice the AFC Beach Soccer Asian Cup (2007, 2008). At the FIFA Beach Soccer World Cup, however, they have never got past the group stage Until 2024. The UAE team has participated in every edition of the Beach Soccer Intercontinental Cup, which was founded after the 2009 FIFA Beach Soccer World Cup was hosted in the United Arab Emirates and which is played only in the UAE. They hosted it again as for the second time in 2024.

== Roster ==
The following players and staff members were called up for the 2021 FIFA Beach Soccer World Cup.

Note: Flags indicate national team as defined under FIFA eligibility rules; some limited exceptions apply. Players may hold more than one non-FIFA nationality.

No.	Pos.	Nation	Player
1	GK	UAE	Bahri
2	FW	UAE	Haitham
3	MF	UAE	Ahmed B.
4	MF	UAE	Waleed B.
5	DF	UAE	Abbas
6	DF	UAE	Rashed
7	MF	UAE	Hesham

No.	Pos.	Nation	Player
8	MF	UAE	Ali
9	FW	UAE	Ali Karim
10	FW	UAE	Walid
11	FW	UAE	Hasan
12	GK	UAE	Humaid
13	GK	UAE	Hussain
14	MF	UAE	Yaqoub S.

Head coach: (United Arab Emirates) Mohamed Abbas Mohamed Bashir Almaazmi
Assistant coach: (Brazil) Victor Barros da Silva Vasques
Goalkeeping coach: (United Arab Emirates) Mohamed Hamza Ali Hussain Almazami

== Competitive record ==
=== FIFA Beach Soccer World Cup ===
FIFA World Cup record										Qualification (AFC) record								
Year	Round	Pos	Pld	W	W+	L	GF	GA	GD	Round	Pos	Pld	W	W+	L	GF	GA	GD
(Brazil) 2005	did not enter									No qualification matches								
(Brazil) 2006	did not qualify									Group stage	5th	2	0	0	2	7	11	−4
(Brazil) 2007	Group stage	14th	3	0	0	3	13	16	−3	Champions	1st	4	4	0	0	21	10	+11
(France) 2008	Group stage	10th	3	1	0	2	12	14	−2	Champions	1st	4	4	0	0	18	6	+12
(United Arab Emirates) 2009	Group stage	10th	3	1	0	2	12	12	0	Automatically qualified as hosts								
(Italy) 2011	did not qualify									Fourth place	4th	6	4	0	2	20	12	+8
(French Polynesia) 2013	Group stage	15th	3	0	0	3	8	14	−6	Third place	3rd	5	4	0	1	23	11	+12
(Portugal) 2015	did not qualify									Fifth place	5th	5	3	0	2	20	19	+1
(The Bahamas) 2017	Group stage	9th	3	1	1	1	6	6	0	Runners-up	2nd	5	3	1	1	25	16	+9
(Paraguay) 2019	Group stage	12th	3	1	0	2	6	9	−3	Runners-up	2nd	5	5	0	1	28	10	+18
(Russia) 2021	Group stage	13th	3	0	1	2	9	12	−3	Cancelled (Note: The Asian qualifiers were originally due to take place in Thailand from 18–28 March 2021. Due to the COVID-19 pandemic, they were initially postponed to between 28 April and 8 May, and were subsequently cancelled entirely in January 2021. In place of the qualifiers, the AFC handpicked their three representatives to go to the World Cup on 21 April, choosing the best performing nations over the course of the previous three editions of the AFC Beach Soccer Championship.)								
(United Arab Emirates) 2024	Quarter-finals	6th	4	1	2	1	6	5	+1	Automatically qualified as hosts								
(Seychelles) 2025	did not qualify									Quarterfinals	7th	4	2	0	2	18	13	+6
Total	0 titles	8/13	25	5	4	16	72	88	–16	2 titles	9/10	40	29	1	11	180	108	+73

=== AFC Beach Soccer Asian Cup ===
AFC Beach Soccer Asian Cup record
Year	Round	Pos	Pld	W	W+	L	GF	GA	GD
(United Arab Emirates) 2006	Group stage	5th	2	0	0	2	7	11	−4
(United Arab Emirates) 2007	Champions	1st	4	4	0	0	21	10	+11
(United Arab Emirates) 2008	Champions	1st	4	4	0	0	18	6	+12
(United Arab Emirates) 2009	did not enter								
(Oman) 2011	Fourth place	4th	6	4	0	2	20	12	+8
(Qatar) 2013	Third place	3rd	5	4	0	1	23	11	+12
(Qatar) 2015	Fifth place	5th	5	3	0	2	20	19	+1
(Malaysia) 2017	Runner-ups	2nd	5	3	1	1	25	16	+9
(Thailand) 2019	Runner-ups	2nd	5	5	0	1	28	10	+18
(Thailand) 2021	Cancelled (Note: see above)								
(Thailand) 2023	Fourth place	4th	6	3	0	3	18	21	−3
(Thailand) 2025	Quarterfinals	7th	4	2	0	2	18	13	+6
Total	2 titles	10/11	46	31	1	14	198	129	+72

=== Beach Soccer Intercontinental Cup ===
BSIC record
Year	Round	Pos	Pld	W	W+	L	GF	GA	GD
(United Arab Emirates) 2011	Fourth place	4th	5	2	0	3	13	17	−4
(United Arab Emirates) 2012	Third place	3rd	5	3	0	2	21	20	+1
(United Arab Emirates) 2013	Third place	3rd	5	3	0	2	18	17	+1
(United Arab Emirates) 2014	Sixth place	6th	5	1	0	4	12	16	−4
(United Arab Emirates) 2015	Fifth place	5th	5	3	1	1	17	13	+4
(United Arab Emirates) 2016	Seventh place	7th	5	1	0	4	13	30	−17
(United Arab Emirates) 2017	Fifth place	5th	5	2	0	3	17	27	−10
(United Arab Emirates) 2018	Sixth place	6th	5	1	0	4	17	27	−10
(United Arab Emirates) 2019	Third place	3rd	5	2	1	2	12	9	+3
(United Arab Emirates) 2021	Eighth place	8th	5	1	1	3	19	26	–7
(United Arab Emirates) 2022	Fourth place	4th	5	2	0	3	13	12	+1
Total	0 titles	11/11	55	21	3	31	172	214	–42
