= Artur Paporotnyi =

Russian beach soccer player

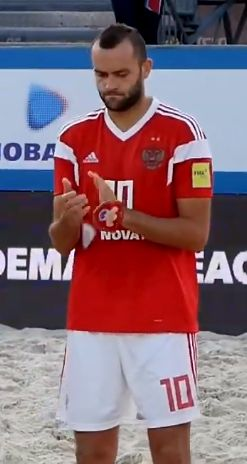

Personal information
- Full name: Artur Sergeyevich Paporotnyi
- Date of birth: 28 November 1985
- Place of birth: Mirny, Soviet Union
- Position: Defender

Team information
- Current team: Kristall
- Number: 14

Senior career*
Years	Team	Apps	(Gls)
2009–2010	City	6	(3)
2011	Mayna Vira	11	(9)
2012	Strogino	14	(5)
2013–	Kristall	294	(181)

International career^{‡}
2011–	Russia national beach soccer team	129	(84)
- * Club domestic league appearances and goals as of 11:48, 28 July 2019 (UTC) ‡ National team caps and goals as of 11:48, 28 July 2019 (UTC)

Medal record

Beach soccer

Representing Russia

FIFA Beach Soccer World Cup
Gold medal – first place	2011 Ravenna	
Gold medal – first place	2021 Moscow	
Bronze medal – third place	2015 Espinho	
Bronze medal – third place	2019 Luque	

Beach Soccer Intercontinental Cup
Silver medal – second place	2014 Dubai	
Gold medal – first place	2015 Dubai	
Bronze medal – third place	2016 Dubai	

European Games
Gold medal – first place	2015 Baku	Team

Artur Sergeyevich Paporotnyi (Russian: Артур Сергеевич Папоротный; born 28 November 1985) is a Russian beach soccer player. Paporotnyi debuted in the Russian national beach soccer team in 2011. Since 2013, he is playing for BSC Kristall.

== Career ==
Paporotnyi was born 28 November 1985 in Mirny, Bryansk Oblast. As a child he played basketball; as a reminder he often performs a basketball shot hand movement on the pitch. Then he started playing association football, he also tried himself in futsal. In 2009, he switched to beach soccer, debuting for City. His first coach was S. Stepanov.

He debuted for the Russia national beach soccer team in 2011. His first match was against Romania at the 2011 Euro Beach Soccer League. After that he was chosen for the 2011 FIFA Beach Soccer World Cup, which Russia won.

In 2019, Artur Paporotnyi, Anton Shkarin, Maxim Chuzhkov and Yuri Krashennikov scored a goal each at the qualification tournament for the 2019 FIFA Beach Soccer World Cup, bringing the score 7–1 against Italy.

== Achievements ==
=== National team ===
- FIFA Beach Soccer World Cup champion: 2011, 2021
- Euro Beach Soccer League champion: 2011, 2017
- Euro Winners Cup champion: 2014, 2015, 2020, 2021

=== Clubs ===
- Russian National champion: 2013, 2015, 2016
- Russian Cup champion: 2015, 2017

=== Individually ===
- 2017 Euro Beach Soccer League, Superfinal – Best Player
- 2021 FIFA Beach Soccer World Cup – Silver Ball
