= Jumeirah Beach =

White sand beach in Dubai

- Beach
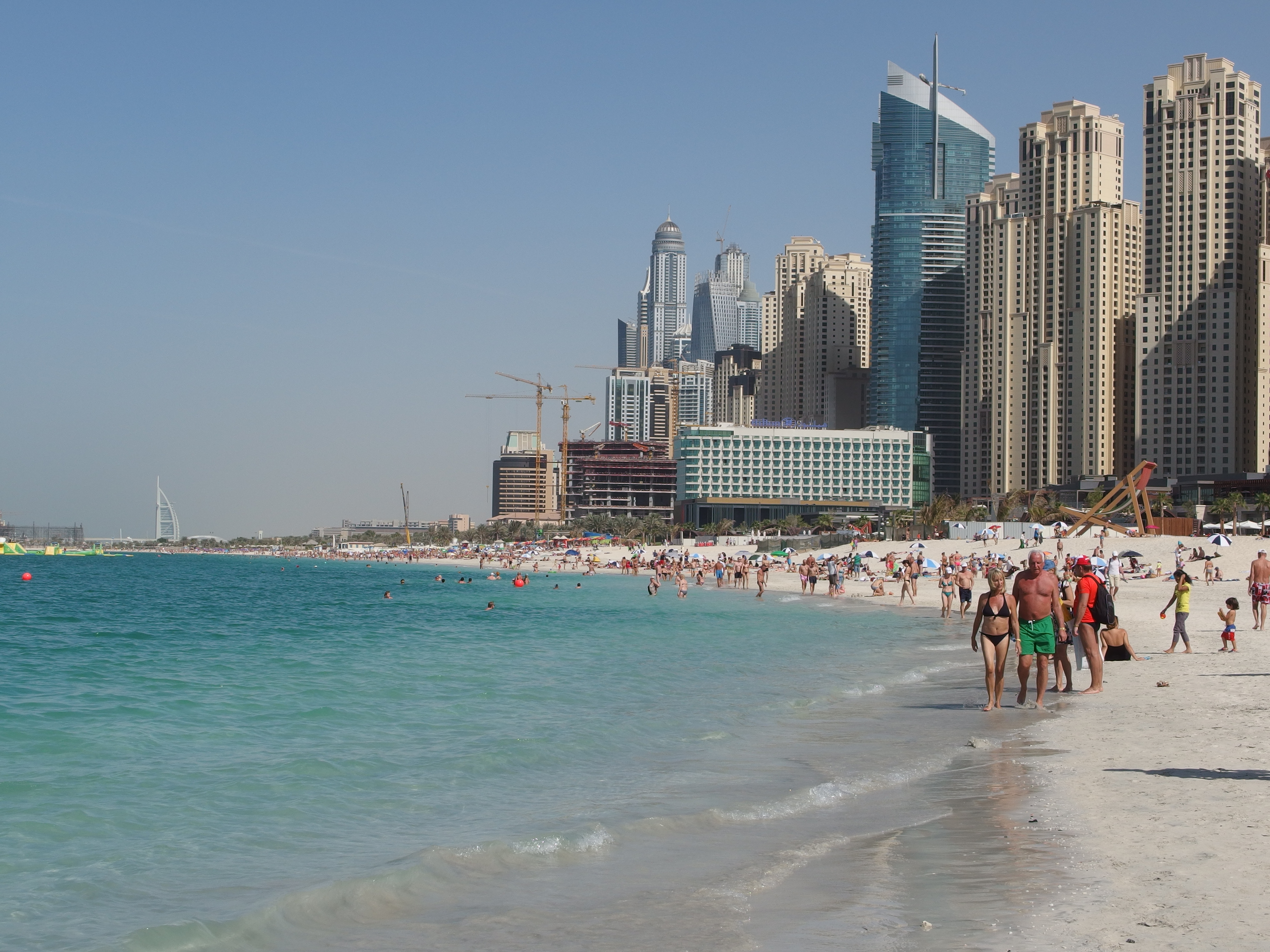
- Jumeirah Beach view

- Location within United Arab Emirates Location within Persian Gulf
- Coordinates: 25.2219°N 55.2559°E
- Location: Jumeirah Dubai

Jumeira Beach is a white sand beach that is located and named after the Jumeirah district of Dubai, United Arab Emirates, on the coast of the Persian Gulf. It stretches along the coast south of the city's historic district to the junction with The Palm Jumeirah and terminates between the southern end of the Jumeirah Beach Residence (adjacent to the Dubai Marina district) and the port facilities at Jebel Ali.

Located in the heart of Dubai, along the coastline, stretching from Burj Al Arab to Jumeirah Beach Residences (JBR).

The adjacent districts to the beach include Jumeirah (1, 2, and 3), Umm Suqeim (1, 2, and 3), and Al Sufouh, though colloquially, this entire string of neighbourhoods and districts from the southern edge of Kerama to the terminus of the Palm Jumeirah at Knowledge Village is sometimes referred to as the Jumeirah Beach Road area.

The beach and its frontage feature large hotels, resorts, and housing developments, including the Burj Al Arab (Arab Tower) hotel, Wild Wadi Water Park, Jumeirah Beach Hotel, and the old-style Madinat Jumeirah, a hotel and shopping complex. On one side of the Burj Al Arab Hotel is a water park (wild wadi) and on the other side is the Jumeirah Beach Park.

== See also ==
- Al Heera Beach Sharjah
- Ajman Beach
- Ain Dubai
