= Aleksey Makarov =

Russian beach soccer player

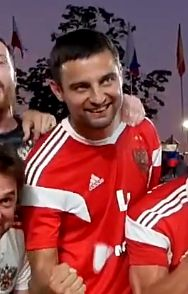

Personal information
- Full name: Aleksey Sergeyevich Makarov
- Date of birth: 20 August 1987
- Place of birth: Moscow, Soviet Union
- Position: Forward

Team information
- Current team: BSC Kristall

Senior career*
Years	Team	Apps	(Gls)
2007–2009	Strogino	22	(31)
2010	Delta Saratov	5	(2)
2010–2018	Lokomotiv Moscow	187	(112)
2017–2021	Spartak Moscow	102	(71)
2021–	BSC Kristall	16	(6)

International career^{‡}
2007–	Russia national beach soccer team	264	(186)
- * Club domestic league appearances and goals as of 20:08, 13 July 2021 (UTC) ‡ National team caps and goals as of 20:08, 13 July 2021 (UTC)

Medal record

Beach soccer

Representing Russia

World Beach Games
Silver medal – second place	2019 Doha	

FIFA Beach Soccer World Cup
Gold medal – first place	2011 Ravenna	
Gold medal – first place	2013 Papeete	
Gold medal – first place	2021 Moscow	
Bronze medal – third place	2015 Espinho	
Bronze medal – third place	2019 Luque	

Beach Soccer Intercontinental Cup
Gold medal – first place	2011 Dubai	
Gold medal – first place	2012 Dubai	
Silver medal – second place	2013 Dubai	
Silver medal – second place	2014 Dubai	
Gold medal – first place	2015 Dubai	

European Games
Gold medal – first place	2015 Baku	Team

Euro Beach Soccer Cup
Gold medal – first place	2010 Rome	
Gold medal – first place	2012 Moscow	
Bronze medal – third place	2016 Belgrade	

Aleksey Sergeyevich Makarov (Russian: Алексей Сергеевич Макаров; born 20 August 1987) is a Russian beach soccer player currently active as a forward.

== Career ==
Makarov began his professional beach soccer team in the FC Strogino club. For a short period he played for FC Delta Saratov in 2010, but then switched to Lokomotive Moscow where he has been playing since 2010. His first coach was Aleksey Grishin. Makarov debuted for the national team in the qualifying rounds of the 2007 Euro Beach Soccer League.

Makarov played for Lokomotive from 2010 to 2018. He switched to Spartak Moscow in 2018. On his debut game within the new club at the Moscow Indoor Championships on 4 March 2018 Makarov also shot his first goal against Strogino.

== Personal life ==
When graduating at the Children's and Youth Sports School "Strogino", Makarov had the options to either start a sports career, or enter a university, choosing the latter. He enrolled in a university and graduated with a degree of "civil structural engineer" after defending his diploma with excellence.

== Achievements ==
Some of Makarov's notable achievements:

=== National team ===
- FIFA Beach Soccer World Cup champion: 2011, 2013, 2021
- Beach Soccer Intercontinental Cup champion: 2011, 2012, 2015
- Euro Beach Soccer Cup champion: 2010, 2012
- Euro Beach Soccer League champion: 2009, 2011, 2013, 2014, 2017

=== Clubs ===
- Russian National champion: 2005, 2008, 2009, 2010, 2011, 2012, 2021
- Russian Cup champion: 2008, 2009, 2011, 2012, 2013, 2016
- Russian Super Cup: 2011

=== Individually ===
- 2017 Euro Beach Soccer League, Stage 3 – Best Player
- Merited Master of Sports (21 December 2012).
