= Dubai Sports Council =

Agency overview
- Formed: 30 November 2005
- Jurisdiction: Government of Dubai
- Headquarters: Dubai Design District; Dubai (Building Number 6, 5th Floor); P.O. Box 9888
- Agency executives: Sheikh Mansoor Bin Mohammed Bin Rashid Al Maktoum, Chairman; Mattar Al Tayer, Deputy Chairman; Saeed Hareb, General Secretary
- Website: www.dubaisc.ae//

Dubai Sports Council is the official sports governing body of the Government of Dubai. It is the lead entity tasked with developing a holistic sports culture for the Emirate. It was founded in 30 November 2005.

Mansoor bin Mohammed Al Maktoum is the first Chairman of the Dubai Sports Council.
