= Eric Cantona =

French actor and footballer (born 1966)

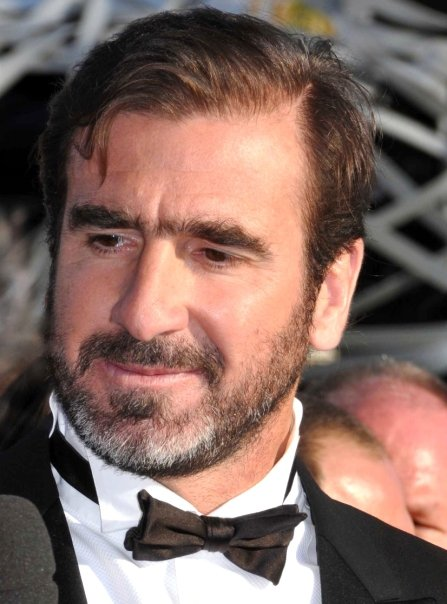
- Cantona in 2009
- Born: Eric Daniel Pierre Cantona; 24 May 1966 (age 60); Marseille, France
- Occupations: Actor; footballer
- Height: 1.88 m (6 ft 2 in)
- Spouses: Isabelle Ferrer (m. 1987; div. 2003) Rachida Brakni (m. 2007)
- Children: 4
Association football career
- Position: Forward
Youth career
- 1980–1981: SO Les Caillols
- 1981–1983: Auxerre
Senior career*
Years	Team	Apps	(Gls)
1983–1988	Auxerre	82	(23)
1985–1986	→ Martigues (loan)	15	(4)
1988–1991	Marseille	40	(13)
1989	→ Bordeaux (loan)	11	(6)
1989–1990	→ Montpellier (loan)	33	(10)
1991–1992	Nîmes	16	(2)
1992	→ Leeds United (loan)	11	(3)
1992	Leeds United	17	(6)
1992–1997	Manchester United	143	(64)
Total		368	(131)
International career
- France U17
- France U21
1987–1995	France	45	(20)
1997–2006	France (beach)		
Managerial career
- 1997–2011: France (beach)
- 2011–2012: New York Cosmos (director of soccer)
- * Club domestic league appearances and goals

Signature
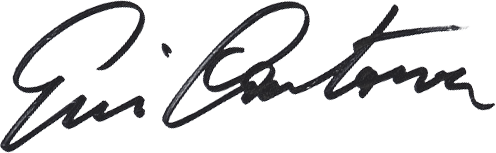

Eric Daniel Pierre Cantona (French: Éric; (French: [eʁik danjɛl pjɛʁ kɑ̃tɔna]; born 24 May 1966) is a French actor and former professional footballer. In his football career, Cantona was a physically strong and technically skilful player with both creative and goalscoring ability. Mostly utilised as a deep-lying forward, he was also capable of playing as a centre-forward, a dedicated striker, an attacking midfielder, or a central midfielder. Regarded as one of the greatest players of his generation, he was named by Pelé in the FIFA 100 list of the world's greatest living players in 2004.

Cantona played for Auxerre, Martigues, Marseille, Bordeaux, Montpellier, Nîmes and Leeds United, before ending his career at Manchester United, with whom he won four Premier League titles in five years, including two League and FA Cup Doubles. He wore the iconic number 7 shirt at Manchester United and was known for turning up his collar. He is affectionately nicknamed "King Eric" by Manchester United fans. Cantona won league championships in England and France in seven of his last eight full seasons as a professional, and at least one trophy in eight of his last nine. At international level, he played for the France national team and scored 20 goals in 45 matches. He appeared at UEFA Euro 1992 and, in preparation for Euro 96, was appointed captain in 1994.

In 2003, Cantona was voted as Manchester United's greatest-ever player by Inside United magazine. He was an inaugural inductee into the English Football Hall of Fame in 2002. At the Premier League 10 Seasons Awards in 2003, he was voted the Overseas Player of the Decade. Cantona was inducted into the Premier League Hall of Fame in 2021. Charismatic and outspoken, Cantona's achievements in football were set against fallings out with coaches and team-mates, and a poor disciplinary record throughout his career, including a 1995 conviction for an assault on an abusive spectator, for which he received a two-week prison sentence, reduced to community service on appeal, and an eight-month suspension from football – preventing him from participating at Euro 96.

In 1997, Cantona unexpectedly announced his retirement from football just before his 31st birthday. He then moved into a career in cinema, including roles in the films Elizabeth (1998), French Film (2008), Looking for Eric (2009) and The Killer (2024). In 2010, he debuted as a stage actor in Face au Paradis, a play directed by his wife, Rachida Brakni. Cantona took an interest in the sport of beach soccer; as player-manager of the France national beach soccer team, he won the 2005 FIFA Beach Soccer World Cup.

== Early life ==
Eric Daniel Pierre Cantona was born in Marseille on 24 May 1966, the son of dressmaker Éléonore Raurich, and nurse and painter Albert Cantona. His mother was Spanish and came from Barcelona, while his paternal grandfather was Italian and had emigrated to Marseille from Ozieri in Sardinia. While fighting the armies of General Franco in the Spanish Civil War in 1938, Cantona's maternal grandfather, Pere Raurich, suffered a serious injury to his liver and had to retreat to France for medical treatment with his wife. They stayed in Saint-Priest, Ardèche, before settling in Marseille.

== Club career ==
=== Early career ===
Cantona began his football career with SO Caillolais, his local team and one that had produced such talent as Roger Jouve and had players such as Jean Tigana and Christophe Galtier within its ranks. Originally, Cantona began to follow in his father's footsteps and often played as a goalkeeper, but his creative instincts began to take over and he would play up front more and more often. In his time with SO Caillolais, Cantona played in more than 200 matches.

=== Auxerre ===
Cantona's first professional club was Auxerre, where he spent two years in the youth team before making his debut on 5 November 1983, in a 4–0 league victory over Nancy. In 1984 his footballing career was put on hold as he carried out his national service. On 14 May 1985, Cantona scored his first goal for Auxerre, scoring an open goal to put his team 2–0 up against Rouen in an important match to put pressure on Monaco. On the final matchday of the season, Auxerre played Strasbourg, with Auxerre needing one point to secure qualification for the following season's UEFA Cup. Trailing 1–0 at half-time, Cantona scored the equalising goal from 25 yards out and showed his talent to a wider audience for the first time. After his discharge he was loaned out to Martigues in the French Second Division before rejoining Auxerre and signing a professional contract in 1986. His performances in the First Division earned him his first full international cap.

The following year, Cantona was again in trouble because of a dangerous kung-fu tackle on Nantes player Michel Der Zakarian, resulting in a three-month suspension, this was later reduced to a two-month suspension as his club Auxerre threatened to make the player unavailable for selection in the national team. He was part of the France under-21 side that won the 1988 U21 European Championship, scoring a hat-trick in a quarter-final against the England under-21 side, and shortly after he transferred to Marseille for a French record fee (FF22m). Cantona had grown up as a Marseille fan.

=== Marseille ===
In January 1989 during a friendly game against Torpedo Moscow he kicked the ball at the crowd, then ripped off and threw away his shirt after being substituted. His club responded by banning him for a month. Just a few months earlier, he had been banned from international matches for one year after insulting the national coach Henri Michel on TV.

==== Loans to Bordeaux and Montpellier ====
Having struggled to settle at Marseille, Cantona moved to Bordeaux on a six-month loan and then to Montpellier on a year-long loan. At Montpellier, he was involved in a fight with team-mate Jean-Claude Lemoult and threw his boots in Lemoult's face. The incident led to six players demanding that Cantona be sacked, but with the support of team-mates such as Laurent Blanc and Carlos Valderrama, the club retained his services, although they banned him from the ground for ten days. Cantona was instrumental as the team went on to win the French Cup and his form persuaded Marseille to take him back.

==== Return to Marseille, transfer to Nîmes ====
Back at Marseille, Cantona initially played well under coach Gerard Gili and his successor Franz Beckenbauer. However, the Marseille chairman Bernard Tapie was not satisfied with the results and replaced Beckenbauer with Raymond Goethals; Cantona was continually at odds with Goethals and Tapie and, despite helping the team win the French Division 1 title, he was transferred to Nîmes the following season, for a fee of ten million francs, signing a three-year contract.

In December 1991, during a match for Nîmes, he threw the ball at the referee, having been angered by one of his decisions. He was summoned to a disciplinary hearing by the French Football Federation and was banned for one month. Cantona responded by walking up to members of the hearing committee in turn and calling each of them an "idiot". His ban was increased to two months and Cantona subsequently announced his retirement from football on 16 December 1991. The France national team coach, Michel Platini, was a fan of Cantona and persuaded him to make a comeback. On the advice of Gérard Houllier, as well as his psychoanalyst, he moved to England to restart his career: "He [my psychoanalyst] advised me not to sign for Marseille and recommended that I should go to England."

==== Departure and move to England ====
On 6 November 1991, after Liverpool's 3–0 victory over Auxerre in a UEFA Cup second round, second leg tie at Anfield, Liverpool manager Graeme Souness was met by Frenchman Michel Platini at the end of the game, who told him that Cantona was available for sale to Liverpool. Souness thanked Platini, but declined the offer, citing dressing room harmony as his reason. After being turned down by Liverpool, Cantona was given a trial at Sheffield Wednesday when Wednesday manager Trevor Francis was approached by Platini and Francis' former agent, Dennis Roach. In a 2012 interview, Francis explained that he had agreed to take Cantona on as a favour to Roach and Platini, who he knew from his time playing in Italy, and that it was intended as an opportunity for Cantona to put himself in the "shop window": Wednesday had only recently been promoted back to the top flight, with most of the squad still being on Second Division-level wages, and the club could not afford to sign him. Cantona spent two days with Wednesday, training and playing in an indoor tournament at the Sheffield Arena.

=== Leeds United ===
==== 1991–92 season ====
Cantona's arrival at Leeds United was announced in January 1992. Leeds would pay £100,000 to Nîmes to take him on loan until 15 April, after which they would have to pay another £900,000 to sign him permanently. Cantona made his debut for Leeds in a 2–0 loss at Oldham Athletic on 8 February 1992. At Leeds, he was part of the team that won the final Football League First Division title before it was replaced by the Premier League as the top division in English football. He made 15 appearances, and despite only scoring three goals, he contributed to their title success, primarily with assists for leading goalscorer Lee Chapman. Cantona scored his first goal for Leeds in a 2–0 win at home to Luton Town on 29 February and set up the other goal for Chapman. Having played little football in the six weeks before signing for Leeds, Cantona struggled to find a place in an established line-up, with manager Howard Wilkinson preferring to put him on against tiring defences. Against Tottenham Hotspur at White Hart Lane on 7 March, Cantona came off the bench to set up a goal for Gary McAllister, securing a win that moved Leeds two points ahead of Manchester United, who had a game in hand, in the title race. Cantona was deployed as a part of a front three, along with Chapman and Rod Wallace, in a 5–1 thrashing of Wimbledon at Elland Road on 14 March, scoring Leeds' fourth goal of the game.

Leeds' title ambitions survived the difficult tests of Arsenal at Highbury (a 1–1 draw with Cantona denied a late winner by David Seaman) and West Ham (a 0–0 draw with Cantona being denied a first-half goal through a dubious offside decision); however, they lost 4–0 to Manchester City on 4 April at Maine Road, allowing Manchester United to take pole position in the title race again. Against Chelsea on 11 April, Cantona came on for Wallace with 20 minutes to go and Leeds leading 1–0; he then set up Chapman's 20th goal of the season before rounding off the scoring with a lob over Chelsea defender Paul Elliott. Two days later, Wilkinson announced that Leeds intended to complete Cantona's transfer from Nîmes for £900,000. Cantona was paid a generous £7,000 a week, a huge cost in an era without television or European football revenue. Starting with that Chelsea match, Leeds went unbeaten in their final five games, securing the league title on the penultimate weekend with a 3–2 win over Sheffield United after Manchester United had lost to Liverpool.

==== 1992–93 season ====
In the 1992 FA Charity Shield that August, with Leeds missing several key players, Cantona scored a hat-trick in a 4–3 victory over Liverpool, the first hat-trick in the Charity Shield since Tommy Taylor in 1957. Cantona's hat-trick places him among the small group of players to have scored three or more goals in games at Wembley. Leeds started their title defence with a 2–1 win over Wimbledon on 15 August; Cantona started alongside Chapman up front, but had a quiet game, although he did pick up his first yellow card in English football, after 17 games. After Cantona scored his first league goal of the season in a 4–1 defeat at Middlesbrough, he followed it up with another hat-trick, the first in the newly created Premier League in a 5–0 win over Tottenham on 25 August. Cantona then flew to Paris to join the France national team for a friendly against Brazil on the very same day, due to newly installed manager Gérard Houllier's desire to have the whole squad present for his first match.

Leeds slipped towards mid-table with a pair of 2–2 draws despite excellent performances by Cantona, drawing two excellent saves from a young David James against fellow title challengers Liverpool on 29 August and scoring a brace against Oldham Athletic three days later. Leeds then fell 2–0 to Manchester United at Old Trafford on 6 September, with Cantona coming off the bench and nearly scoring with a bicycle kick. Leeds' first foray into the European Cup since 1974–75 started poorly with a 3–0 defeat at Stuttgart on 16 September; Cantona, struggling with a hamstring injury, had a pass intercepted that led to Stuttgart's opening goal, exacerbating a growing rift with manager Wilkinson. Cantona missed the next two games, a 1–1 draw at Southampton and a 4–1 win over Scunthorpe United in the League Cup, through injury, but returned immediately to help Leeds win their first league game in six, a 2–0 victory over Everton on 26 September.

Four days later, Leeds faced Stuttgart in the return leg of the European Cup. Dubbed the 'Mission Impossible', Cantona and Gordon Strachan combined to set up Gary Speed, who scored with a left-footed volley. Andreas Buck equalised for Stuttgart in the 34th minute, the away goal meaning that Leeds needed another four to progress. McAllister scored a penalty just before half-time to make it 2–1 to Leeds before Cantona's looping shot in the 66th minute was deflected into his own net by Günther Schäfer. Chapman's header at the near post made it 4–1 in the 78th minute but Stuttgart remained firm and denied Leeds the decisive fifth goal. However, Leeds received a stroke of luck when it emerged after the match that Stuttgart's coach, Christoph Daum, had fielded four 'foreign' players, one more than allowed. Leeds were awarded a 3–0 victory by UEFA and a play-off match was ordered at the neutral Camp Nou in Barcelona on 9 October.

An exhausted Leeds then stumbled to a 4–2 defeat at Ipswich Town, with Cantona's form dipping through fatigue and injury. He had a poor game, as Leeds won the play-off against Stuttgart 2–1. A return to national duty then saw Cantona and Jean-Pierre Papin score in a 2–0 victory over Austria. He brought his revived form back to England, helping in a 3–1 victory against Sheffield United in October. This game would, however, be Cantona's last win while with Leeds.

Leeds were drawn against Rangers in the European Cup, a tie billed as 'The Battle of Britain' by the press. Despite McAllister's first-minute goal, Cantona and Leeds struggled and fell 2–1 amid a hostile Ibrox crowd. Cantona walked straight to the dressing room after being substituted, which was interpreted by Wilkinson as disrespectful to the other players. Leeds also lost the return leg 2–1, Rangers scoring through Mark Hateley and Ally McCoist, before Cantona scored a late consolation goal. In between the two games, Cantona was an unused substitute when Leeds travelled to Queens Park Rangers as Wilkinson, favouring a more direct approach, found no room for him. Leeds lost 2–1, with Cantona leaving for France after being granted leave on the morning of the match. Wallace was preferred to start over Cantona in a fighting 2–2 draw at home to Coventry City. Managing just one win in four, Leeds' title defence had imploded in October, just as Arsenal's had in the previous season.

Cantona did however start in the 4–0 defeat at Manchester City on 7 November, but put in a hapless performance along with the rest of the team. Cantona was then guilty of "two dreadful misses" as Watford knocked them out of the League Cup on 10 November. Despite suffering along with his team, Wilkinson, rather than Cantona, was held responsible, after having to reinvigorate a side with a number of ageing stars. Despite Cantona scoring (with his shoulder) for France against Finland four days later, Wilkinson kept him out of the team, citing an unconvincing excuse of a "groin strain", as Leeds pulled off an improbable but resounding 3–0 win over Arsenal, ending the Gunners' six-game winning run. Furious at being dropped, Cantona refused to report for training and faxed a transfer request to the club on 24 November, stating a preference to join Manchester United, Liverpool or Arsenal.

=== Manchester United ===
==== Transfer from Leeds United ====
The news of Cantona's impending transfer from Leeds to fierce rivals Manchester United was met with hostility from Leeds fans. The transfer was, however, seen as a good piece of business by most football pundits, removing a turbulent player from the team.

Cantona left Leeds for Manchester United for £1 million on 26 November 1992. Leeds chairman Bill Fotherby had telephoned Manchester United chairman Martin Edwards to enquire about the availability of Denis Irwin. Edwards was in a meeting with manager Alex Ferguson at the time and both agreed that Irwin was not for sale. Ferguson had identified that his team was in need of a striker, having failed to secure the services of Alan Shearer that summer, and after new signing Dion Dublin was injured a few games into the season, had failed in his attempts to sign David Hirst, Matt Le Tissier and Brian Deane. Ferguson instructed his chairman to ask whether Cantona was for sale. Fotherby had to consult with Wilkinson, but within a few days the deal was complete.

==== 1992–93 season ====
"He [Cantona] illuminated Old Trafford. The place was a frenzy every time he touched the ball."

— Alex Ferguson, Cantona's manager at Manchester United.

"The Frenchman waltzed into The Cliff, United's old training ground, and had team-mates in his thrall with barely a word. In his first season, the first of the Premier League era, he cultivated what would become the hallmarks of United for two decades: attacking football, ingenuity, aggression and an utter insistence on winning. As Paul Ince recalled: "He just had that aura and presence. He took responsibility away from us. It was like he said: 'I'm Eric, and I'm here to win the title for you'."

— FourFourTwo magazine, "How Cantona transformed Manchester United, the Premier League, and a Christmas Carol"

Cantona had arrived too late to register to play in United's 1–0 win at Arsenal on 28 November, but was in the crowd at Highbury as his new team secured a vital win. He made his first appearance for the club on 1 December 1992 in a friendly match against Benfica in Lisbon to mark Eusébio's 50th birthday, wearing the number 10 shirt. He made his competitive debut as a second-half substitute against Manchester City at Old Trafford on 6 December. United won 2–1, though Cantona made little impact that day.

United's season had been disappointing up to Cantona's signing. A shortage of goals and a recent seven-match winless run had seen United fall behind the likes of big-spending Aston Villa and Blackburn Rovers in the race for the first Premier League title, as well as surprise challengers including Norwich City and Queens Park Rangers.

Goalscoring had been a problem since the halfway point of the previous season – when it had cost them the league title as they suffered defeats or were held to draws against teams they had been expected to beat. Ferguson had first tried to sign Alan Shearer from Southampton during the 1992 close season, but lost out to Blackburn Rovers. He then spent £1 million on Dion Dublin, who suffered a broken leg a few games into the season and was out of action for six months. A £3 million bid for Sheffield Wednesday striker David Hirst was turned down and, by 7 November, United were tenth in the Premier League.

Cantona quickly settled into the team, slotting in alongside Mark Hughes, while Brian McClair was switched to central midfield. Cantona contributed greatly to a quick upturn in the team's fortunes, not only scoring goals but also creating chances for the other players. His first United goal came in a 1–1 draw against Chelsea at Stamford Bridge on 19 December 1992 and his second came on Boxing Day in a 3–3 draw against Sheffield Wednesday at Hillsborough, where they claimed a point after being 3–0 down. However, controversy was never far away and on his return to Elland Road to play Leeds a few weeks later, he spat at a Leeds fan who taunted him and was fined £1,000 by The Football Association. United only lost twice in the league after Cantona's arrival and finished the season ten points clear at the top of the table, finishing as champions for the first time in 26 years, which made Cantona the first player to win consecutive English top-division titles with different clubs. He had won a domestic league title with different clubs for three successive seasons, having helped Marseille win the French league title in 1991.

==== 1993–94 season ====
"Collar turned up, back straight, chest stuck out, Eric glided into the arena as if he owned the place."

— Cantona's Manchester United team-mate Roy Keane

United retained the Premier League in 1993–94, topping the table for virtually the entire season, and Cantona's two penalties helped them to a 4–0 win over Chelsea in the 1994 FA Cup Final. He also collected a runners-up medal in the Football League Cup, which the team lost 3–1 to Aston Villa. He was also voted PFA Player of the Year for that season and finished as United's top scorer with 25 goals in all competitions; however, the season was not without its moments of controversy: Cantona was sent off as the team exited the Champions League against Galatasaray and was also dismissed in successive league games in March 1994, firstly against Swindon Town and then against Arsenal. The two successive red cards saw Cantona banned for five matches, including an FA Cup semi-final clash with Oldham Athletic, which United drew 1–1. Cantona was available for the replay and helped them win 4–1.

1993–94 was the first season of squad numbers in the Premier League. Cantona was issued with the number 7 shirt, a squad number he kept for the rest of his United career and that already had iconic status, having previously been worn by club legends including George Best and Bryan Robson; however, squad numbers were not yet set for Champions League matches (or in domestic cup ties against lower division sides) and Cantona wore the number 9 shirt in the four fixtures home and away against Kispest Honvéd and Galatasaray. On 19 December 1993, he scored two against Aston Villa, the previous season's runners-up, in a 3–1 victory that put United 13 points clear at the top of the league. They extended their lead to 16 points soon after and eventually finished eight points ahead of runners-up Blackburn. Cantona was United's top scorer with 26 goals in all competitions. He also won the PFA Player of the Year award.

==== 1994–95 season, 'kung-fu' incident and ban from football ====
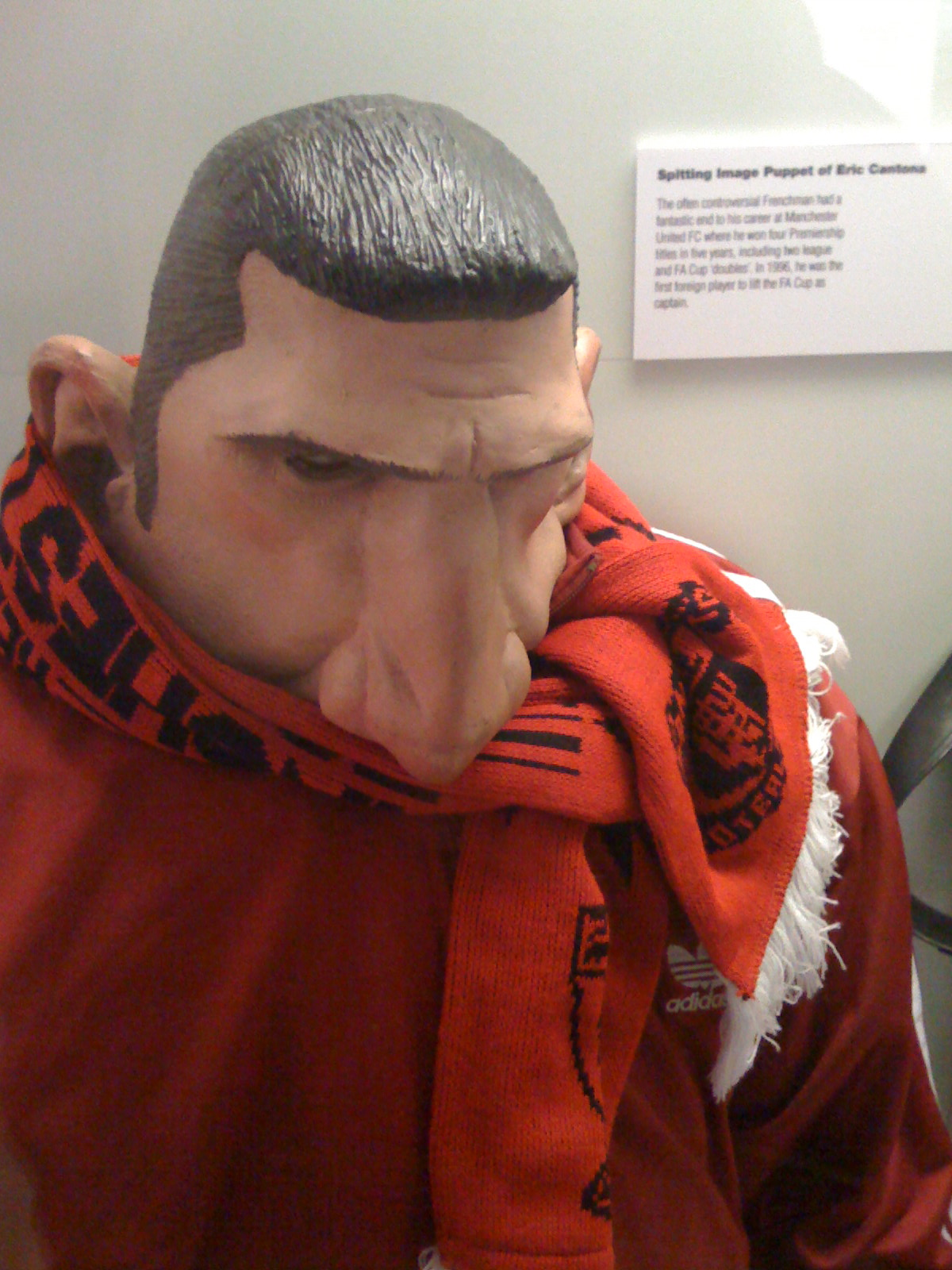
The puppet of Cantona which appeared on the British satirical puppet show Spitting Image during the 1990s

In the 1994–95 season, United were in the hunt for a third successive league title, and for the first half of the season, things went smoothly enough for player and club. The season began with a 2–0 Wembley win over Blackburn in the Charity Shield, in which Cantona scored a penalty. Cantona frequently scored for Manchester United, who once again battled for the title against a Blackburn side that led the table for much of the season, particularly with a 4–2 win at Ewood Park in late October, in which Cantona was on the scoresheet. He was also on the scoresheet in a memorable 5–0 derby win over Manchester City in November. On 22 January 1995, he scored the winning goal in a 1–0 home win over Blackburn that made the title race even tighter and brought Cantona's tally of league goals for that season to 12. He scored a further goal in an FA Cup third-round win at Sheffield United earlier that month, fuelling talk of a second successive title. The arrival of striker Andy Cole from Newcastle United on 10 January further boosted these hopes, even though Cole was cup-tied for FA Cup fixtures.

On 25 January 1995, he was involved in an incident that attracted headlines and controversy worldwide. In an away match against Crystal Palace, Cantona was sent off by referee Alan Wilkie for kicking Palace defender Richard Shaw, after Shaw had frustrated Cantona throughout the game by closely marking him. As he was walking towards the tunnel, Cantona launched a 'kung-fu' style kick into the crowd, directed at Palace supporter Matthew Simmons, who had run down eleven rows of stairs to confront and shout abuse at Cantona. Simmons was alleged to have used the words "Fuck off back to France, you French bastard". Cantona followed the kick with a series of punches.

At a press conference called later, Cantona said, in a slow and deliberate manner:

"When the seagulls follow the trawler, it's because they think sardines will be thrown into the sea. Thank you very much."

— Cantona's brief, much-publicised, statement

Cantona then got up from his seat and abruptly left, leaving behind him a packed media room surprised and baffled – some roared with laughter – with those in the room trying to decipher his cryptic words.

Cantona was faced with a criminal charge of assault, which he admitted to on 23 March, resulting in a two-week prison sentence, although he was freed on bail pending an appeal. This was overturned in the appeal court a week later and instead he was sentenced to 120 hours of community service, which was spent coaching children at United's training ground. The fan who was attacked by Cantona, Matthew Simmons, went on trial separately a year later, and claimed that he only shouted "Off! Off! Off! It's an early bath for you, Mr Cantona!", but was found guilty of abusive behaviour and handed a £500 fine and banned from the stadium for a year, having already had his season ticket withdrawn by Crystal Palace within days of the incident. Immediately after the verdict was proclaimed, Simmons then assaulted prosecutor Jeffrey McCann, for which he was sentenced to a week in jail, plus an additional £500 fine as well as £200 in legal costs.

As well as criminal proceedings, there was also disciplinary action from his club and The FA. A lengthy ban from the game was regarded as inevitable, with some critics calling for Cantona to be deported and never allowed to play football in England again, while others called for him to be banned from football for life. In accordance with The FA's wishes, United's initial action was to fine Cantona £20,000 for the assault and to confirm that he would not play for the first team for the rest of the season, although United were still in the hunt for a second double. The FA then increased the ban to eight months, up to and including 30 September 1995, and fined him a further £10,000.

The FA Chief Executive Graham Kelly described his attack as "a stain on our game" that brought shame on football. FIFA then confirmed the suspension as worldwide, meaning that Cantona could not escape the ban by being transferred or loaned to a foreign club. He was stripped of the captaincy of the France national team by coach Aimé Jacquet, and never played for the France national team again; his club went on to lose the title to Blackburn Rovers.

There had been media speculation that Cantona would leave United to play for a foreign club when his suspension finished and many observers felt he would not be able to cope with the inevitable goading from rival players and supporters once his suspension finished. Ferguson persuaded him to stay in Manchester, despite interest from Italian club Inter Milan, who had managed to lure his team-mate Paul Ince to Italy that summer.

Even after signing his new contract, Cantona was frustrated by the terms of his ban, which did not even allow him to play in friendly matches behind closed doors. On 8 August, he handed in a request for his contract to be terminated, as he no longer wanted to play football in England. This came after United had been censured by the FA for fielding Cantona in a match against another club at the club's training ground, which was defined as a friendly match, despite the club organising the match as being within the context of training – as his suspension allowed him to play in this type of match only. The request was turned down and two days later, following a meeting in Paris with Ferguson, he declared that he would remain at the club.

In 2011, Cantona said that the attack on Simmons was "a great feeling" and a memory he is happy for fans to treasure, but "... it was a mistake". In 2002, the notoriety of the kung fu kick saw it ranked number 12 on Channel 4's poll of the 100 Greatest Sporting Moments. In retrospect, Simmons' behaviour that provoked Cantona's kick would a decade later be regarded as racial abuse, which almost certainly would have forced the partial or full closure of Crystal Palace's stadium, as well as meriting Simmons a considerably lengthier sentence. More recently, when Paul Pogba's Manchester United team-mate Marcus Rashford was racially abused on social media, and ex-footballer Garth Crooks said that "[i]f something drastic is not done soon…" there could be an incident between a player and a fan, similar to Cantona's kung-fu kick on the offensive fan in 1995.

==== 1995–96 season ====
Cantona's ban ended on Saturday, 30 September, which offered Sky the chance to put that weekend's game back to Sunday, 1 October or Monday, 2 October. It might conceivably have been at home to Coventry or away to Bolton, but even the fixture computer had a sense of theatre: Liverpool (H).

— The Guardian on Cantona's return game from his eight month suspension, at home to arch rivals Liverpool.

In his comeback game against arch rivals Liverpool on 1 October 1995, Cantona set up a goal for Nicky Butt two minutes into the game and then scored a penalty to secure a point for United in a 2–2 home draw. However, eight months without competitive football had taken its toll and Cantona struggled for form in his first three months back in action; by 24 December, the gap between United and league leaders Newcastle had increased to ten points, and eventually to twelve.

However, Cantona recaptured his form in the new year. During January 1996, the gap between United and the leaders stretched to 12 points, but the comeback began when Cantona scored the winning goal at West Ham, and shortly afterwards Cantona excelled on his first visit to Selhurst Park since he was banned, during which he scored twice in a 4–2 win over Wimbledon. Victory over Arsenal on 20 March, with Cantona scoring the only goal of the game with a 25-yard half-volley, saw United overtake Newcastle in the title race, where they remained for the rest of the season, with Cantona having already scored the winner at Newcastle earlier that month. The goal came as part of a personal scoring run of six consecutive league matches for Cantona, four of which saw him score the game's only goal. He scored the fifth in a 5–0 win over Nottingham Forest on the penultimate day of the season, a result that meant that United realistically only needed to avoid defeat at Middlesbrough on the final day; they won 3–0 to secure their third league title in four years. Cantona finished the season as the club's top scorer with 14 goals from 30 league appearances. United had suffered just one defeat after the turn of the year.

Cantona's ban meant he was not eligible to appear in either of their UEFA Cup fixtures, nor the first leg of their League Cup second-round tie, but he did score in four of United's six matches on the way to the 1996 FA Cup Final against Liverpool, their third in a row in the competition. In the absence of regular captain Steve Bruce due to injury, Cantona wore the armband for the final and took on the captain's responsibility by volleying in the only goal of the game from the edge of the penalty area in the 86th minute after Liverpool had failed to clear a corner. United's victory made them the first club to win the double twice and Cantona the first FA Cup-winning captain from outside the British Isles.

==== 1996–97 season ====
"The terrace chant of "Ooh Aah Cantona", sung with such fervour by the Manchester United faithful whenever their French hero scored, looks set to become a trademark."

— Following retirement, in May 1997 Cantona has his chant (and "Cantona 7") patented as commercial trademarks.

Cantona was named as United's captain for the 1996–97 season following the departure of Bruce to Birmingham City. United retained the league in the 1996–97 season; Cantona had won four league titles in five years with the team, and six in seven years including those won with Marseille and Leeds, the exception being the 1994–95 season which he had missed the second half of through suspension. United also reached the semi-finals of the Champions League (European Cup) - their best run of form in the competition for 28 years.

On 18 May 1997, shortly after the end of the 1996–97 season, Cantona caused a major shock when he announced his retirement from football. The decision was announced at a press conference at Old Trafford, at which he was not present, and came following several weeks after media reports suggested that he might soon be leaving the club. United manager Alex Ferguson later revealed in his autobiography that Cantona had in fact informed him of his intention to quit football the previous month.

His final competitive game came against West Ham on 11 May 1997, and his final appearance before retiring was five days later on 16 May in a testimonial for David Busst (whose career had been ended by an injury suffered against United the previous year) against Coventry City at Highfield Road. Cantona had scored a total of 64 league goals for United, 13 in domestic cup competitions, and five in the Champions League, bringing his tally to 82 goals in less than five years.

=== After leaving ===
In 1998, the Football League, as part of its centenary season celebrations, included Cantona on its list of 100 League Legends. Cantona's achievements in the English League were further marked in 2002 when he was made an inaugural inductee of the English Football Hall of Fame. Later in 1998, Cantona organised a match of Manchester United players against other players from around the world in what was originally designed to be a memorial for the victims of the Munich air disaster in 1958 and their families, but which was merged with a testimonial for Cantona himself.

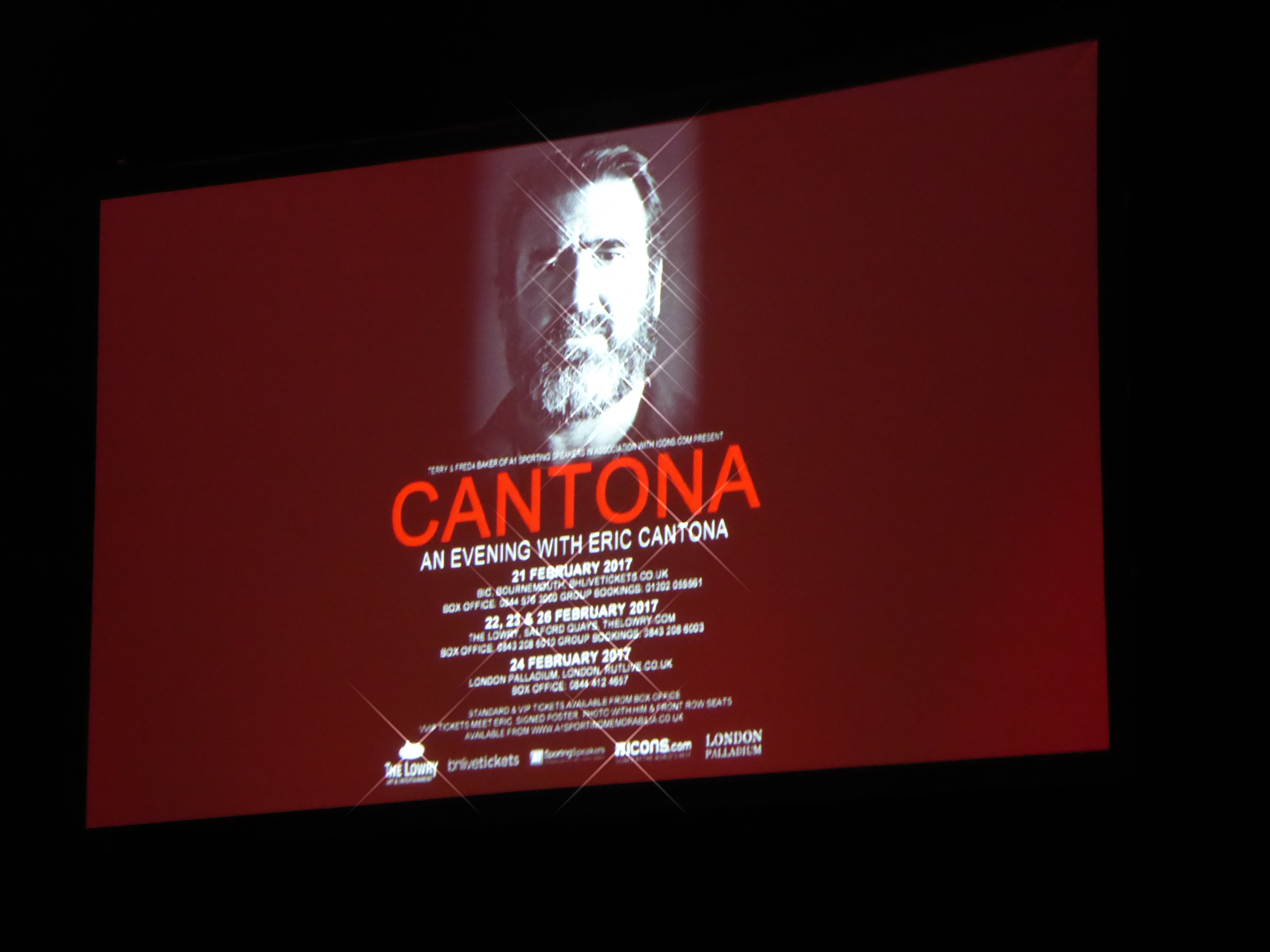
An Evening with Eric Cantona was held at the Lowry in Salford, Greater Manchester, in February 2017

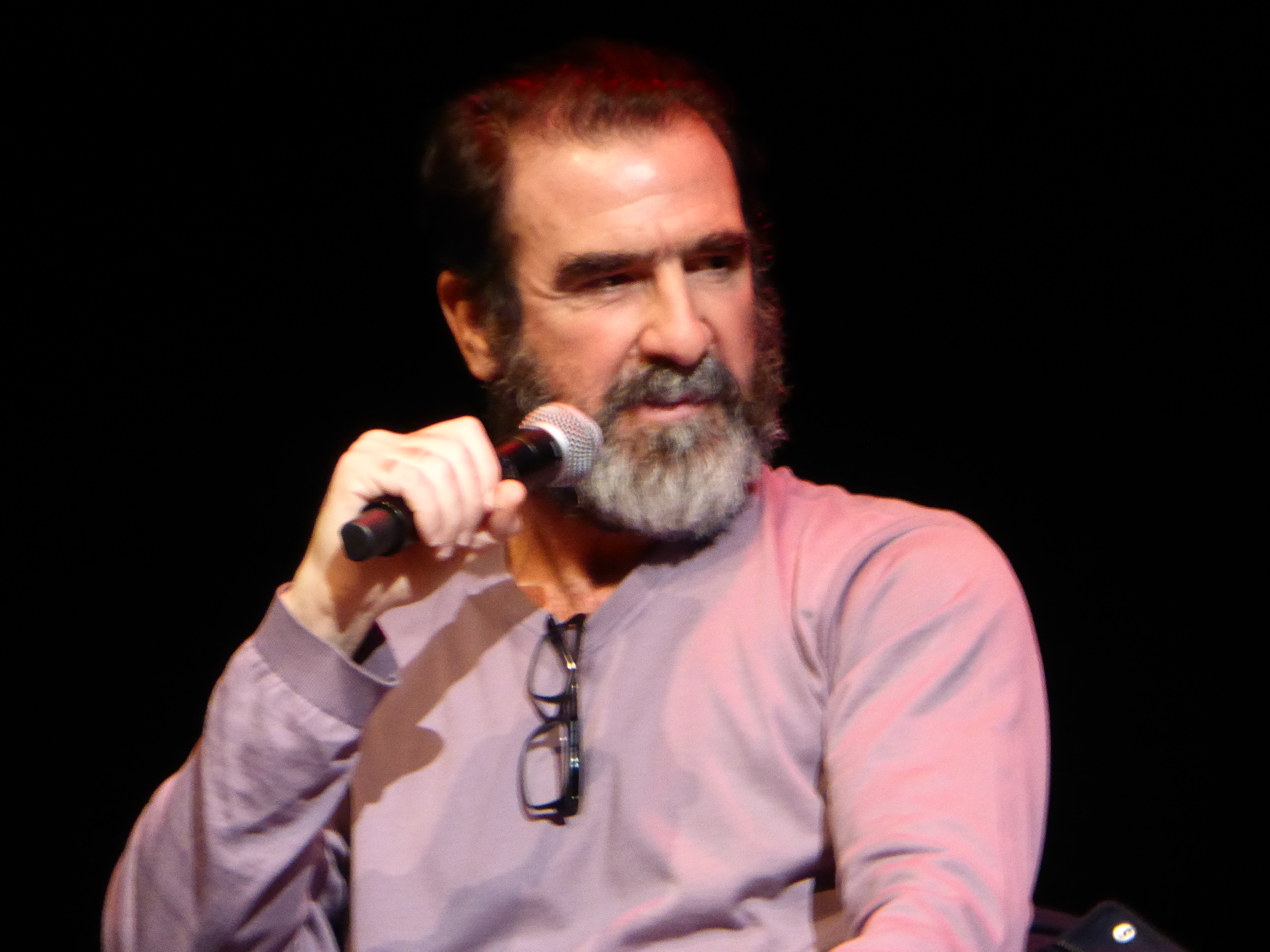
Cantona being interviewed on stage

In his 1999 autobiography Managing My Life, Alex Ferguson claimed that Cantona had informed him of his decision to retire from playing within 24 hours of Manchester United's Champions League semi-final defeat to Borussia Dortmund, though the decision was not made public for almost a month afterwards. During that time, there had been speculation about his future at Manchester United, including talk of a move to Real Zaragoza of Spain. Returning to Britain in 2003 to pick up the Overseas Player of the Decade Award at the Premier League 10 Seasons Awards, Cantona said of his premature retirement: "When you quit football it is not easy, your life becomes difficult. I should know because sometimes I feel I quit too young. I loved the game but I no longer had the passion to go to bed early, not to go out with my friends, not to drink, and not to do a lot of other things, the things I like in life." In 2004, Cantona was quoted as saying: "I'm so proud the fans still sing my name, but I fear tomorrow they will stop. I fear it because I love it. And everything you love, you fear you will lose."

He was interviewed in a "Number 7s" issue of Manchester United's official magazine, United, in August 2006, stating he would only return to United as 'Number 1' (meaning not return as assistant manager or coach) and would create a team like no other and play the way he thinks football should be played; however, Cantona opposed the ownership of Manchester United by the Glazer family and stated that he would not return to the club, even as a manager, while they were in charge.

In March 2014, Cantona was arrested and cautioned for an act of common assault on Regent's Park Road in Camden, North London. The victim did not require medical attention.

Cantona received the UEFA President's Award in August 2019. Dressed in a flat cap, he began by quoting William Shakespeare's King Lear – "As flies to wanton boys we are for the gods" – before referencing science, war and crime. Similar to the response to his "seagulls" press conference in 1995, the puzzled audience watched in silence.

== International career ==
Cantona was given his full international debut against West Germany in August 1987 by national team manager Henri Michel. In September 1988, angered after being dropped from the national team, Cantona referred to Michel as a "bag of shit" in a post-match TV interview and was indefinitely banned from all international matches. However, Michel was sacked shortly after that, having failed to qualify for the 1990 FIFA World Cup. The new coach was Michel Platini and one of his first acts was to recall Cantona. Platini stated that, whilst he was coach, Cantona would be selected for France as long as he was playing competitive top-class football; it was also Platini who had initiated Cantona's move to England to restart his career. France qualified for UEFA Euro 1992 held in Sweden, but failed to win a single game despite the strike partnership of Cantona and Jean-Pierre Papin. Platini resigned after the finals to be replaced by Gérard Houllier.

Under Houllier, Cantona remained a first-choice forward alongside Papin during qualification for the 1994 FIFA World Cup, with France relying heavily on the pair for goals. He scored six goals in eight qualifying appearances. Cantona also scored France's opening goal in their final qualifier against Bulgaria, but France lost 2–1 at home, despite needing only a draw to qualify. Houllier subsequently resigned and Aimé Jacquet took over. Jacquet began to rebuild the national team in preparation for Euro 96 and appointed Cantona as captain. According to former teammate Patrice Loko, Cantona commanded respect within the squad and exerted considerable influence as captain. Cantona remained captain until the Selhurst Park incident in January 1995 that led to his ban and captaincy being stripped. In addition, he lost his place to Zinedine Zidane, as Jacquet had revamped the squad with new players. Cantona, Papin and David Ginola lost their places in the squad and were never selected for the French team again, thus missing Euro 96.

Though there was media criticism about Cantona's omission, as he was playing his best football in the Premier League, Jacquet stated that the team had done well without Cantona and that he wanted to keep faith with the players who had taken them so far. In a 2015 interview with French radio network France Info, Cantona stated that, had he still been involved with the national side, he would have extended his career to feature in the 1998 FIFA World Cup, held in Cantona's home nation. Cantona still harbours resentment for the people at the head of his national team, but also admiration for his adopted football country; at UEFA Euro 2004 and the 2006 FIFA World Cup, he supported England and not France.

== Post-playing career ==
=== Acting career ===
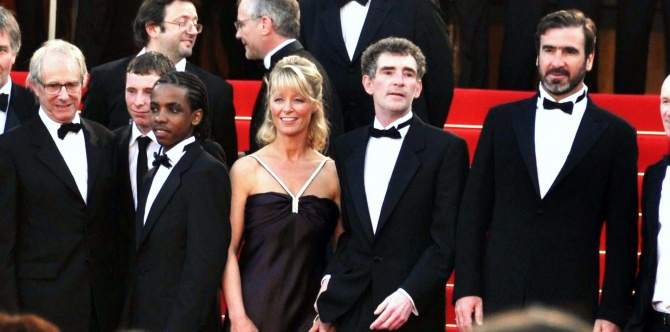
Cantona (far right) at the premiere of Ken Loach's film Looking for Eric (2009) at the 2009 Cannes Film Festival.

Cantona focused his later career mostly as an actor in French cinema, having had his first role as a rugby player in Le bonheur est dans le pré, shot during his 1995 suspension from football. In the late 1990s, he accepted a role as a French ambassador in the English film Elizabeth (1998). In 2002, he directed a short film, Apporte-moi ton amour. He guest-starred as a mysterious barroom philosopher in independent British film Jack Says, released to DVD in September 2008. He co-starred as director Thierry Grimandi in French Film (2009), and was co-producer and a lead actor in Ken Loach's Palme d'Or-nominated film Looking for Eric (2009). He stars as The Corsican in the Danish western The Salvation, which premiered at the 2014 Cannes Film Festival on 17 May 2014.

In January 2020, Cantona played The King in the music video for Liam Gallagher's single "Once". He subsequently returned to feature films, starring in the action thrillers AKA (2023) and The Killer (2024). In 2026, he made a double appearance at the Cannes Film Festival, starring as a wine merchant in the comedy film Marvellous Mornings and featuring as the subject of the biographical documentary film Cantona.

==== Work with Nike and other companies ====
1966 was a great year for English football. Eric was born.

— Nike slogan which appeared on billboards throughout England in 1994, referencing Cantona's birth (the same year England won the World Cup)

Cantona has frequently appeared in commercials for the sportswear company Nike. In 1994, he was involved in a Nike advertising campaign which featured a black and white image of himself in front of the English flag, with the caption: "'66 was a great year for English football. Eric was born." In 1996, he was the central figure in a Nike commercial titled "Good vs Evil" in a gladiatorial game set in a Roman amphitheatre. Appearing alongside football players from around the world, including Ronaldo, Paolo Maldini, Luís Figo, Patrick Kluivert and Jorge Campos, they defend "the beautiful game" against a team of demonic warriors, which ends with Cantona receiving the ball from Ronaldo, pulling up his shirt collar in his trademark style, and delivering the final line, "Au Revoir", before striking the ball which punches right through the demon goalkeeper.

Since his retirement from professional football in 1997, Cantona has continued to appear in Nike commercials, often in a non-playing role. In 1997, he starred in Nike's "Park Life" commercial, set to the song "Parklife" by Blur, in which a group of pub league players playing amateur football at Hackney Marshes in east London are suddenly joined by top Premier League footballers, including Cantona, Ian Wright, David Seaman and Robbie Fowler. In 2000, "Park Life" was ranked number 15 in Channel 4's poll of the 100 Greatest TV Ads.

In a global Nike advertising campaign in the run-up to the 2002 FIFA World Cup entitled "Secret Tournament", Cantona starred as the organiser of "underground" games (branded by Nike as "Scorpion KO") in a commercial directed by Terry Gilliam, featuring prominent football players such as Thierry Henry, Ronaldinho, Francesco Totti, Roberto Carlos and Hidetoshi Nakata. In a Nike campaign ahead of the 2006 FIFA World Cup, Cantona appeared as the lead spokesman for the Joga Bonito organisation, an association attempting to eliminate acting and fake play from football. He also starred in a Eurostar commercial in 1996, and an Irish EuroMillions advertisement in 2004. In 2009, he featured in a British television advertisement for a new model of the Renault Laguna.

=== Beach soccer ===
Shortly after his departure from Manchester United in 1997, Cantona became captain of the France national beach soccer team, gaining an interest in the sport through his brother Joel who was already a part of the France national side travelling the world to play matches. Cantona continued his interest in beach soccer games in southern Asia and at the Inaugural Kronenbourg Beach Soccer Cup in 2002, in Brighton, England.

As a recognisable figure, Cantona was key to beach soccer's growth during the sports early years, being a magnet for drawing in fans to beach soccer events, and also helping to promote the sport, saying in 2002, "Physically it is difficult, technically it is difficult, and tactically it's difficult too. We must work very hard, and train regularly together. Beach Soccer has got everything needed to be a great sport."

He found considerable success as he managed and played in the French team which won their first European title at the 2004 Euro Beach Soccer League. At the inaugural FIFA Beach Soccer World Cup in Rio de Janeiro in 2005, he was player-manager of the team and scored one goal in a 7–4 win against Spain. France ended up winning the tournament. This was Cantona's final year as a player. However, he continued to coach the France national team at the 2006 Beach Soccer World Cup, which finished third. In 2007, Cantona enjoyed another successful year as manager, taking France to fourth place in the World Cup and narrowly missing out on a second European title, finishing runners-up to Portugal after a 7–6 loss in the final of the 2007 Euro Beach Soccer League. The World Cup was held in France for the first time in 2008; however, Cantona was unable to make the top four after losing to Italy in the quarter-finals.

After failing, as manager, to qualify France to the World Cup for the first time in 2009, Cantona's demise as head coach was sealed in 2010 as not only did France fail to qualify for the upcoming World Cup again, but Cantona also lead the national team to relegation from the top division of the Euro Beach Soccer League down to Division B. These series of disappointments lead to Cantona resigning as manager of France in 2011, after almost 15 years involved in the team. In 2019, the magazine France Football placed Cantona fourth in an article named "10 Legends of Beach Soccer".

=== Brief stint with New York Cosmos ===
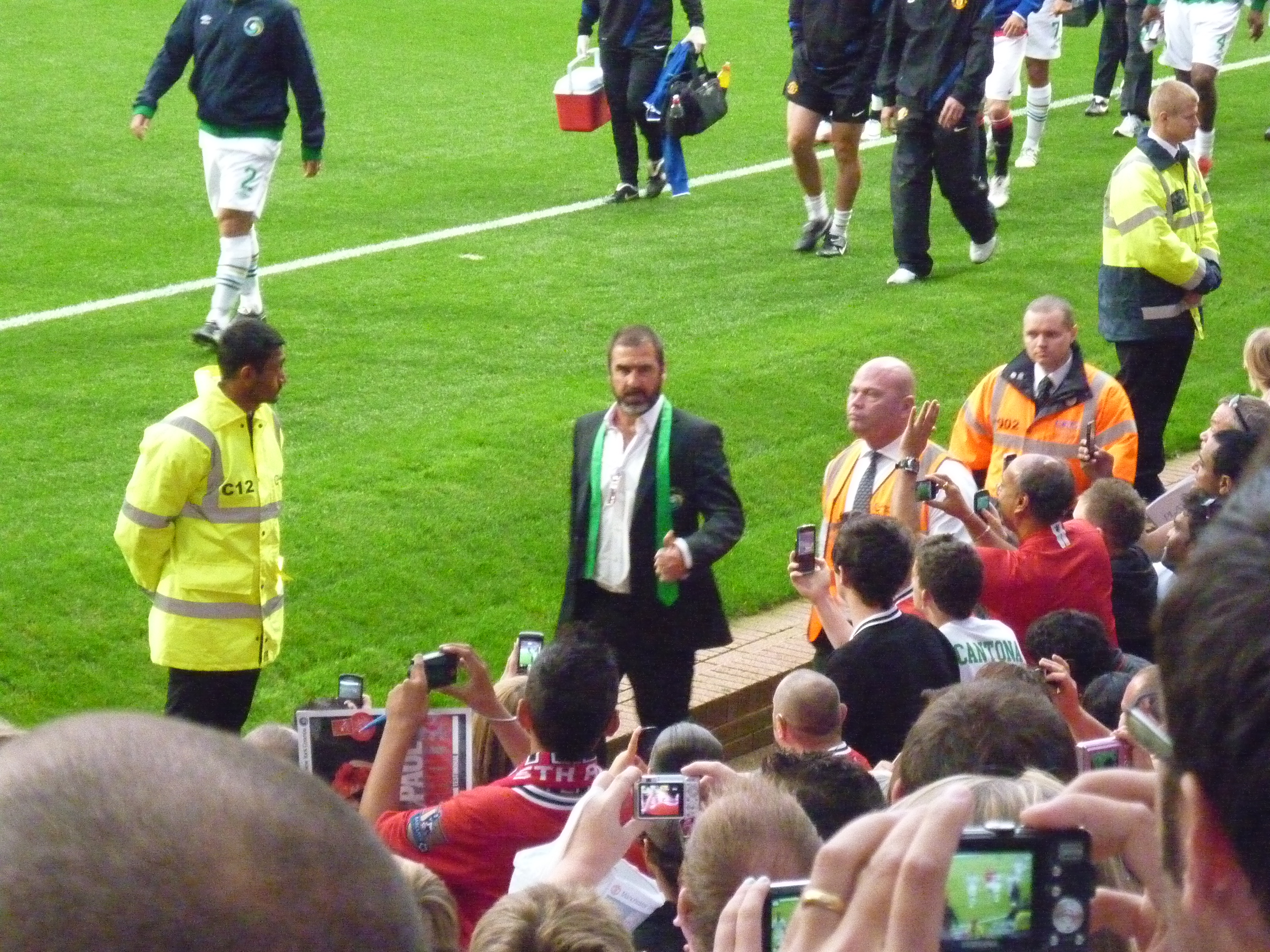
Cantona at Old Trafford with the Cosmos, 5 August 2011

New York Cosmos announced the Frenchman's return to football as their Director of Soccer on 18 January 2011. On arrival, Cantona described his role to the press as to help Cosmos "regain the number one position in the United States and then ... to become one of the best clubs in the world over the coming years." Cantona was later fired by the club after a confrontation with a photographer, and in May 2015, he sued the Cosmos for nearly $1 million in back pay and a promised 4% equity share. Cosmos rejected his claims, insisting that his role as Director of Soccer was largely ceremonial and that Cantona's true job was as "a promoter and brand ambassador". The two parties later agreed to dismiss the lawsuit, though terms of a settlement were not disclosed.

== Player profile ==
=== Style of play ===
Cantona was renowned for his vision, passing, intelligence and playmaking skills, in addition to his eye for goal and powerful and accurate striking ability, which often saw him score from spectacular strikes and volleys. As such, he often played in a free, creative role between the midfield and forward lines throughout his career, acting as a deep-lying forward behind the main striker, due to his tendency to drop deep into midfield to retrieve the ball and orchestrate attacking plays, as well as his ability both to score goals and provide assists for team-mates. However, Cantona was also capable of playing as a centre-forward, due to his ability to hold-up the ball with his back to goal, although this was not his favoured position, as an out–and–out striker, as an attacking midfielder, or even as a central midfielder on occasion. He was also an accurate penalty and free kick taker.

Due to his height, physique, positional sense and heading accuracy, he was strong in the air. He was known for being both mentally and physically tough, and was highly regarded for his strong, commanding and charismatic personality, as well as his leadership qualities and bravery, which helped to alleviate pressure from his team-mates. Cantona was known for turning up his collar during matches. Wayne Barton noted that he first wore his collar up in a Manchester derby match on 7 November 1993, following United's elimination from Europe at the hands of Galatasary, commenting: "One wonders if, in his own superstitious way, this was Cantona's way of calming that fire inside him after the trip to Turkey, a way to focus his thoughts on moving forward." When asked about the reason behind his famous on-field appearance, he commented: "I didn't plan it. During one game it was cold and my collar just stayed up. We won, so it became a habit to play with my collar up."

Cantona was a hard-working player, who also stood out for his defensive contribution off the ball, as well as his ability to start attacking plays after winning back possession. He also drew praise in the media for his discipline and dedication in training. Despite his talent and ability, he was also notorious for his aggression, confrontational behaviour, volatile temper and lack of discipline on the pitch, as well as his tendency to commit hard challenges, which made him a highly controversial figure in world football. While was known for being outspoken on a number of issues, he was also accused in the media of being arrogant. When he was asked whether Zidane or Platini was the greatest French player of all time, for example, he said: "No, it is me."

=== Reception ===
Cantona is considered to be one of the greatest players of his generation; he was named by Pelé in the FIFA 100 list of the world's greatest living players in 2004. He is also regarded by pundits as one of the greatest players in Premier League history, and as one of Manchester United's and France's greatest players ever. However, he also drew criticism from certain pundits for being inconsistent at times, for his subdued performances at UEFA Euro 1992, where France were eliminated in the group stage without winning a match, and for his performances in European club competitions, as well as his lack of significant pace, which was particularly evident in his later career. In contrast, Cantona's performances during qualification for the 1994 FIFA World Cup received more favourable assessments, with the campaign regarded as arguably his best period with the French national team.

== Political views ==
Cantona called for a social revolution against the banks and encouraged customers of the major retail banks to withdraw their money on 7 December 2010 in protest at the 2008 financial crisis. This proposal became the basis of an online campaign calling for a bank run.

In January 2012, Cantona began trying to gather the 500 signatures from elected officials necessary for a bid for the French presidential election that year, in order to draw support for the homeless charity and campaign group Emmaus.

=== Palestine ===
In June 2012, he signed a petition for the release of Palestinian footballer Mahmoud Sarsak, imprisoned without conviction by Israel in July 2009 and released on 10 July 2012. In September 2025, Cantona made an appearance at the Together For Palestine charity fundraising event where he called for Israel to be suspended by FIFA and UEFA and urged clubs to refuse to play against teams from Israel. He signed an open pledge with Film Workers for Palestine pledging not to work with Israeli film institutions "that are implicated in genocide and apartheid against the Palestinian people".

== Personal life ==
Cantona married Isabelle Ferrer in 1987. They have two children together. They divorced in 2003, the year he co-starred in The Overeater with Rachida Brakni, whom he married in 2007. They have two children together.

Cantona's brother, Joël, is a former footballer who retired at a young age and went into acting as well. His cousin, Sacha Opinel, was also a footballer.

== Career statistics ==
=== Club ===
Appearances and goals by club, season and competition
Club	Season	League			National cup (Note: Includes Coupe de France, FA Cup)		League cup (Note: Includes Football League Cup)		Continental		Other		Total	
Club	Season	Division	Apps	Goals	Apps	Goals	Apps	Goals	Apps	Goals	Apps	Goals	Apps	Goals
Auxerre	1983–84	Division 1	2	0	0	0	–		–		–		2	0
Auxerre	1984–85	Division 1	5	2	0	0	–		0	0	–		5	2
Auxerre	1985–86	Division 1	7	0	0	0	–		1 (Note: Appearances in UEFA Cup)	0	–		8	0
Auxerre	1986–87	Division 1	36	13	4	4	–		–		–		40	17
Auxerre	1987–88	Division 1	32	8	5	1	–		2	1	–		39	10
Auxerre	Total		82	23	9	5	–		3	1	–		94	29
Martigues (loan)	1985–86	Division 2	15	4	0	0	–		–		–		15	4
Marseille	1988–89	Division 1	22	5	0	0	–		–		–		22	5
Marseille	1990–91	Division 1	18	8	0	0	–		3 (Note: Appearances in European Cup)	1	–		21	9
Marseille	Total		40	13	0	0	–		3	1	–		43	14
Bordeaux (loan)	1988–89	Ligue 1	11	6	1	0	–		0	0	–		12	6
Montpellier (loan)	1989–90	Ligue 1	33	10	6	4	–		–		–		39	14
Nîmes	1991–92	Ligue 1	16	2	0	0	–		–		–		16	2
Leeds United	1991–92	First Division	15	3	0	0	0	0	–		–		15	3
Leeds United	1992–93	Premier League	13	6	0	0	1	0	5 (Note: Appearances in UEFA Champions League)	2	1 (Note: Appearances in FA Charity Shield)	3	20	11
Leeds United	Total		28	9	0	0	1	0	5	2	1	3	35	14
Manchester United	1992–93	Premier League	22	9	1	0	0	0	0	0	–		23	9
Manchester United	1993–94	Premier League	34	18	5	4	5	1	4	2	1	0	49	25
Manchester United	1994–95	Premier League	21	12	1	1	0	0	2	0	1	1	25	14
Manchester United	1995–96	Premier League	30	14	7	5	1	0	0	0	–		38	19
Manchester United	1996–97	Premier League	36	11	3	0	0	0	10	3	1	1	50	15
Manchester United	Total		143	64	17	10	6	1	16	5	3	2	185	82
Career total			368	131	33	19	7	1	27	9	4	5	439	165

=== International ===
Appearances and goals by national team and year
National team	Year	Apps	Goals
France	1987	3	1
France	1988	2	0
France	1989	4	3
France	1990	7	6
France	1991	4	2
France	1992	9	2
France	1993	7	5
France	1994	8	1
France	1995	1	0
Total		45	20

Scores and results list France's goal tally first, score column indicates score after each Cantona goal.

List of international goals scored by Eric Cantona
No.	Date	Venue	Opponent	Score	Result	Competition
1	12 August 1987	Olympiastadion, Berlin, Germany	West Germany	1–2	1–2	Friendly
2	16 August 1989	Malmö Stadion, Malmö, Sweden	Sweden	1–1	4–2	Friendly
3	16 August 1989	Malmö Stadion, Malmö, Sweden	Sweden	4–2	4–2	Friendly
4	11 October 1989	Parc des Princes, Paris, France	Scotland	2–0	3–0	1990 FIFA World Cup qualification
5	24 January 1990	Kazma SC Stadium, Kuwait City, Kuwait	East Germany	1–0	3–0	Friendly
6	24 January 1990	Kazma SC Stadium, Kuwait City, Kuwait	East Germany	2–0	3–0	Friendly
7	28 February 1990	Stade de la Mosson, Montpellier, France	West Germany	2–1	2–1	Friendly
8	28 March 1990	Népstadion, Budapest, Hungary	Hungary	1–0	3–1	Friendly
9	28 March 1990	Népstadion, Budapest, Hungary	Hungary	2–1	3–1	Friendly
10	5 September 1990	Laugardalsvöllur, Reykjavík, Iceland	Iceland	2–0	2–1	UEFA Euro 1992 qualifying
11	20 November 1991	Parc des Princes, Paris, France	Iceland	2–0	3–1	UEFA Euro 1992 qualifying
12	20 November 1991	Parc des Princes, Paris, France	Iceland	3–0	3–1	UEFA Euro 1992 qualifying
13	14 October 1992	Parc des Princes, Paris, France	Austria	2–0	2–0	1994 FIFA World Cup qualification
14	14 November 1992	Parc des Princes, Paris, France	Finland	2–0	2–1	1994 FIFA World Cup qualification
15	17 February 1993	Ramat Gan Stadium, Ramat Gan, Israel	Israel	1–0	4–0	1994 FIFA World Cup qualification
16	28 April 1993	Parc des Princes, Paris, France	Sweden	1–1	2–1	1994 FIFA World Cup qualification
17	28 April 1993	Parc des Princes, Paris, France	Sweden	2–1	2–1	1994 FIFA World Cup qualification
18	28 July 1993	Stade Michel d'Ornano, Caen, France	Russia	2–0	3–1	Friendly
19	17 November 1993	Parc des Princes, Paris, France	Bulgaria	1–0	1–2	1994 FIFA World Cup qualification
20	26 May 1994	Kobe Universiade Memorial Stadium, Kobe, Japan	Australia	1–0	1–0	1994 Kirin Cup

== Honours ==
Auxerre

- Cup of the Alps: 1986–87

Marseille

- Division 1: 1988–89, 1990–91

Montpellier

- Coupe de France: 1989–90

Leeds United

- Football League First Division: 1991–92
- FA Charity Shield: 1992

Manchester United

- Premier League: 1992–93, 1993–94, 1995–96, 1996–97
- FA Cup: 1993–94, 1995–96
- FA Charity Shield: 1993, 1994, 1996
- Football League Cup runner-up: 1993–94

France U21

- UEFA European Under-21 Championship: 1988

France

- Kirin Cup: 1994

France Beach

- Euro Beach Soccer League: 2004
- FIFA Beach Soccer World Cup: 2005

Individual

- Division 1 Rookie of the Year: 1987
- Most assists in the Premier League: 1992–93, 1996–97
- Ballon d'Or third place: 1993
- BBC Sport Goal of the Month: February 1994, December 1996
- PFA Premier League Team of the Year: 1993–94 Premier League
- PFA Players' Player of the Year: 1993–94
- FWA Footballer of the Year: 1995–96
- Premier League Player of the Month: March 1996
- Sir Matt Busby Player of the Year: 1993–94, 1995–96
- Onze d'Or: 1996
- ESM Team of the Year: 1995–96
- Premier League 10 Seasons Awards (1992–93 to 2001–02)
  - Overseas and Overall Team of the Decade
  - Overseas Player of the Decade
- Inducted into the inaugural English Football Hall of Fame: 2002
- UEFA Golden Jubilee Poll: No.42
- FIFA 100 Greatest Living Footballers: 2004
- Football League 100 Legends
- Golden Foot Legends Award: 2012
- 10th French Player of the Century
- UEFA President's Award: 2019
- Premier League Hall of Fame: 2021

== Filmography ==
=== Film ===
Year	Title	Role	Notes
1995	Eleven Men Against Eleven	Player	Television film
1995	Happiness Is in the Field	Lionel	
1998	Elizabeth	Paul de Foix	
1998	Mookie	Antoine Capella	
1999	The Children of the Marshland	Jo Sardi	
2001	The High Life	Bocce Player 2	
2003	The Overeater	Séléna	
2003	The Car Keys	Comedian	
2005	It's Our Life!	Pierre	
2005	Une belle histoire		
2006	Lisa et le pilote d'avion	Fando	
2007	The Second Wind	Alban	
2008	Jack Says	Man at Bar	
2008	Black Butterfly	Jack	Television film
2008	French Film	Thierry Grimandi	
2009	Looking for Eric	Himself	Executive producer
2009	La liste	Michaël Lombardi	Television film
2010	Together Is Too Much	Gérard	
2011	Switch	Damien Forgeat	
2011	De Force	Manuel Makarov	
2011	Etreinte	Eric	
2012	Porn in the Hood	Football coach	
2012	Hip Moves	Michel	
2013	You and the Night	The Stallion	
2013	The Class of '92	Himself	Documentary
2014	The Salvation	The Corsican	
2015	The Mad Kings	Jacky Chichinet	
2016	Marie & the Misfits	Antoine	
2017	Anka	The Brazilian	
2018	Ulysses & Mona	Ulysse	
2020	Inhuman Resources	Alain Delambre	Miniseries
2021	Sir Alex Ferguson: Never Give In	Himself	Documentary
2021	The United Way	Himself	Documentary
2023	AKA	Victor Pastore	Television film
2024	The Killer	Jules Gobert	
2026	Les matins merveilleux	Titou	

=== Documentaries ===
- Les rebelles du foot (2012)
- Looking for Istanbul (2012)
- Foot et immigration, 100 ans d'histoire commune (2014)
- Looking for Rio (2014)
- Looking for Athènes (2013)
- The Stone Roses: Made of Stone (2013)
- Manchester United: The Official History 1878–2002 (2002)

=== Stage ===
- Face au paradis (English title: Faced with Paradise) – 2010 (stage production directed by Rachida Brakni)

== Discography ==
=== Albums ===
- Cantona Sings Eric: First Tour Ever (2024), Barclay/Universal
- Perfect Imperfection (2026), Barclay/Universal

=== Singles and EPs ===
- I'll Make My Own Heaven (2023), Barclay/Universal
- "I Love You So Much" (2024), Barclay/Universal

== Bibliography ==
- Auclair, Philippe (2009). Cantona: The Rebel Who Would Be King. Macmillan. ISBN 978-0-230-74430-1.
- Blacker, Terence; Donaldson, William (1997). The Meaning of Cantona: Meditations on Life, Art and Perfectly Weighted Balls. Mainstream Publishing. ISBN 978-1-85158-950-0.
- Cantona, Eric (1996). Cantona on Cantona: Reflections of a sporting legend. Andre Deutsch. ISBN 978-0-233-99045-3.
- Robinson, Michael (1995). La Philosophie De Cantona. Prentice Hall. ISBN 978-1-898051-39-8.
- Wightman, Rob (2002). FourFourTwo Great Footballers: Eric Cantona. Virgin Books. ISBN 978-0-7535-0662-2.
- Worrall, Frank (2008). "Chapter 7: From Caveman to Cavemen". The Magnificent Sevens. London: John Blake Publishing. p. 103. ISBN 978-1-84454-609-1.
