= Sacha Opinel =

French association football player (born 1977)

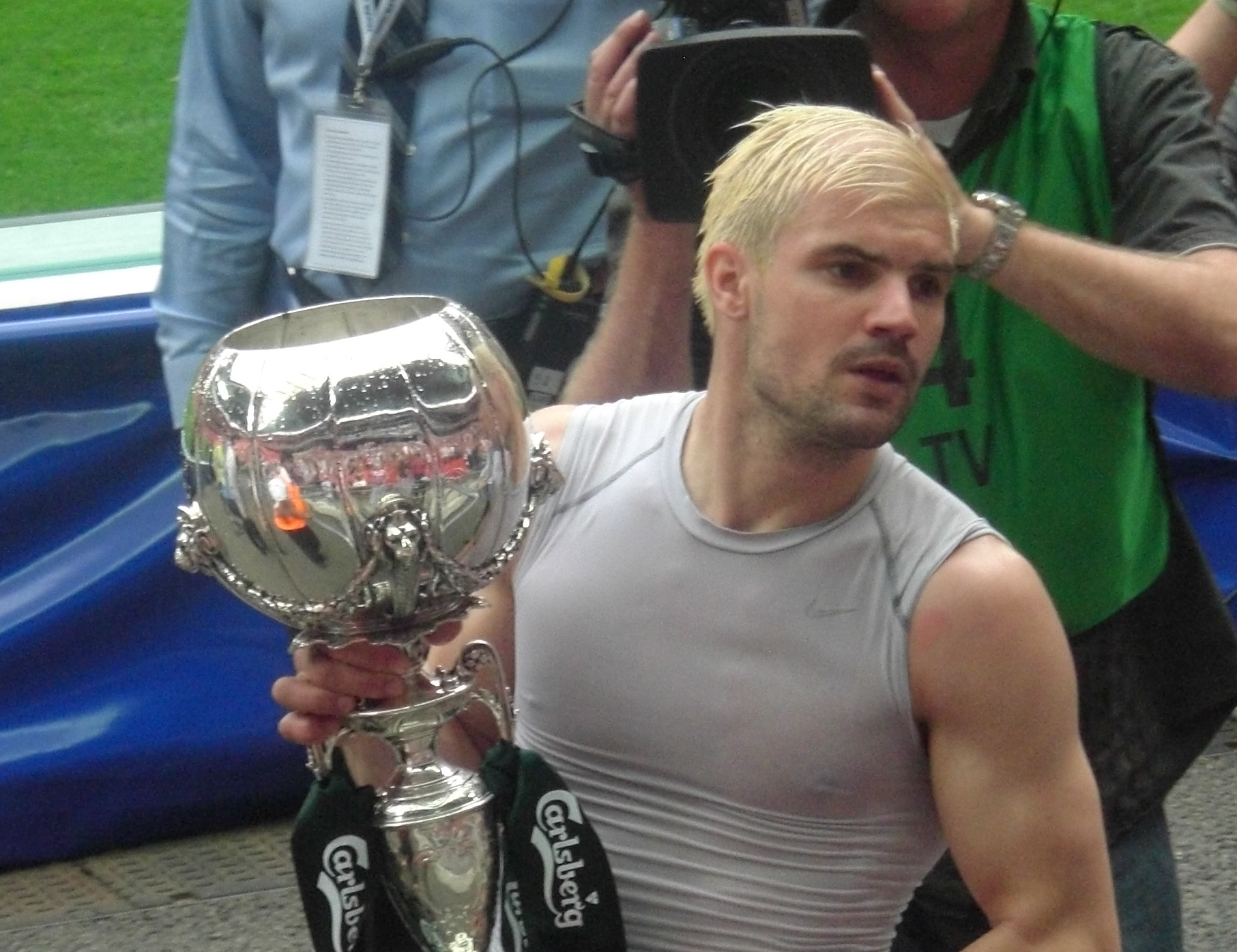
- Opinel after winning the 2008 FA Trophy Final with Ebbsfleet United

Personal information
- Full name: Sacha Fernand Henri Opinel
- Date of birth: 9 April 1977 (age 49)
- Place of birth: Bourg-Saint-Maurice, France
- Height: 1.77 m (5 ft 10 in)
- Position: Defender

Senior career*
Years	Team	Apps	(Gls)
1991–1997	Cannes		
1997–1998	Lille II	11	(0)
1998–1999	Ajaccio	7	(0)
1999–2000	Raith Rovers	22	(0)
2000–2001	Plymouth Argyle	0	(0)
2001	Leyton Orient	11	(1)
2001–2002	Billericay Town	24	(2)
2003–2005	Farnborough Town	56	(2)
2005–2006	Crawley Town	31	(2)
2006–2009	Ebbsfleet United	104	(0)
2009–2010	Farnborough	11	(1)
2010	→ Eastbourne Borough (loan)	2	(0)
2010	→ Burgess Hill Town (loan)		
2010–2011	Harlow Town		
- * Club domestic league appearances and goals

Sacha Fernand Henri Opinel (born 9 April 1977) is a French former professional footballer who played as a defender. He made over 200 appearances across France, Scotland, and England, winning the FA Trophy in 2008.

== Career ==
Opinel began his career with French clubs Cannes, Lille and Ajaccio before joining Scottish club Raith Rovers in December 1999, where he made over 20 league and cup appearances. He was released by Rovers in December 2000 by mutual consent after a series of on and off-the-field problems. After training with Third Division club, Plymouth Argyle, Opinel was given a short-term contract so that manager Paul Sturrock could take a closer look at him over the 2000 Christmas and New Year period. He made only one appearance for Plymouth in a Football League Trophy tie against Bristol Rovers and was not offered a contract. After a trial at AFC Bournemouth, he joined Leyton Orient in February 2001, where he made eleven appearances in the remainder of the 2000–01 season, scoring one goal against Cardiff City, and helped Orient towards the Third Division play-offs in May 2001.

Opinel then dropped into non-league football, joining Billericay Town at the beginning of the 2001–02 season. He joined Farnborough Town in July 2003, signing a two-year contract in May 2004, but requested a transfer for personal and professional reasons and joined Crawley Town in January 2005 in a deal that saw Farnborough receive a substantial transfer fee as well as having Robert Traynor move from Crawley to Farnborough. Opinel had started over 50 games for Farnborough. Opinel agreed a contract until May 2006 with Crawley and in July 2006, he joined Gravesend & Northfleet (now Ebbsfleet United). He signed a new contract in May 2007 and collected a winners' medal when Ebbsfleet won the FA Trophy at Wembley Stadium in May 2008. On 4 June 2009, Opinel re-joined Farnborough.

== Personal life ==
Opinel is the cousin of former professional footballer Eric Cantona and actor Joël Cantona.

== Honours ==
Ebbsfleet United

- FA Trophy: 2007–08
