= 2004 Euro Beach Soccer League =

Tournament details
- Dates: 2 July – 5 September
- Teams: 18 (from 1 confederation)
- Venue: 10 (in 10 host cities)

Final positions
- Champions: France (1st title)
- Runners-up: Portugal
- Third place: Ukraine
- Fourth place: Italy

Tournament statistics
- Matches played: 77
- Goals scored: 834 (10.83 per match)
- Top scorer: (Portugal) Madjer
- Best player: (Spain) David Cordon
- Best goalkeeper: (Spain) Roberto Valeiro

In 2004, BSWW rebranded the competition from the European Pro Beach Soccer League to the Euro Beach Soccer League. With the Pro dropped from the title and European shortened to Euro, this prompted the design of a new logo to reflect the new title. Mastercard became lead sponsors in 2004 and as such their logo was also included in the wider design. This holistic logo was used until its last use in 2006.

Locations of the events of the 2004 Euro Beach Soccer League
Division A events
Division B events
Division A, B & C events
Superfinal

The 2004 Euro Beach Soccer League, was the seventh edition of the Euro Beach Soccer League (EBSL), originally known as the European Pro Beach Soccer League, the premier beach soccer competition contested between European men's national teams, occurring annually since its establishment in 1998. The league was organised by Beach Soccer Worldwide (BSWW) between July 2 and September 5, 2004, in ten different nations across Europe.

This season, BSWW introduced a third division, Division C, to the EBSL alongside the already existing Divisions A and B. Each team continued, as in the previous seasons, to compete in their respective division, including the newly added Division C nations, to try and earn a place in the season-finale event, the Superfinal, in which the league title was then contested directly.

Spain, who entered as defending champions, had looked odds on favourites to reclaim their title after dominating the top Division but suffered a shock loss to the Division C qualifiers and debutants, Ukraine, in the first round of the Superfinal. This opened the door for France, who had originally narrowly qualified for the season-finale, to ultimately be crowned champions, winning their first and to date only European title.

The league also doubled as the qualification process for the first FIFA Beach Soccer World Cup in 2005. The nations finishing in first, second and third place qualified directly whilst the teams in fourth through seventh place competed in a final play off stage to decide which nation would gain the remaining berth at the World Cup.

== Teams ==
This season 18 nations took part in the Euro Beach Soccer League whom were and were distributed as follows:

=== Division A (6) ===
- England
- France
- Italy
- Norway
- Portugal
- Spain

=== Division B (5) ===
- Austria
- Belgium
- Germany
- Switzerland
- Turkey

=== Division C (7) ===
- Greece
- Hungary
- Monaco
- Netherlands
- Poland
- ~~Slovenia~~ (withdrew)
- Sweden
- Ukraine

=== Superfinal berths ===
There were eight berths available in this season's Superfinal, expanded from the six spots in previous seasons. The table summarises in what positions nations needed to finish in their respective divisions in order to qualify to the Superfinal, what round of the Superfinal they would enter finishing in said positions, and the seeding they would receive.

Allocations

- Division A, consisting of the best teams of the EBSL, was awarded four Superfinal berths
- Division B, as the middle tier, received three berths
- The new Division C, in consideration of being the bottom tier of teams, received just one berth.

Seed	Position in Division	Division	Round entered
1	Winner	A	Quarter-finals
2	Runner-up	A	Quarter-finals
3	Third place	A	Quarter-finals
4	Fourth place	A	Quarter-finals
5	Winner	B	Quarter-finals
6	Runner-up	B	Quarter-finals
7	Third place	B	Quarter-finals
8	Winner	C	Quarter-finals

== Division A ==
Division A consisted of six rounds of fixtures known as stages, with one stage hosted in each of the six countries participating as shown. Four teams took part in each, with each team taking part in a total of four of the six stages. In each stage, the teams played each other once. The nation who earned the most points at the end of the stage was crowned stage winners.

At the end of the six stages all results were tallied up in a final league table.

=== Stage 1 ===
The first stage took place in Marseille, France. Portugal claimed the stage.

==== Matches ====
2 July 2004
Portugal	7–3	Italy
France	5–3	Norway
3 July 2004
France	7–9	Italy
Norway	3–4	Portugal
4 July 2004
Italy	5–4	Norway
France	10–10 (a.e.t.); 1–2 (pens.)	Portugal

==== Final standings ====
Pos	Team	Pld	W	W+	L	GF	GA	GD	Pts
1	Portugal	3	2	1	0	21	16	+5	8
2	Italy	3	2	0	1	17	18	–1	6
3	France	3	1	0	2	22	22	0	3
4	Norway	3	0	0	3	10	14	–4	0

Awards
Best player: (France) Didier Samoun
Top scorer(s): (Portugal) Belchior, (Portugal) Madjer (8 goals)
Best goalkeeper: (Norway) Karl Røsland

=== Stage 2 ===
The second stage took place in Scoglitti, Italy. Spain won their first stage of the season.

==== Matches ====
9 July 2004
Spain	9–2	Norway
Italy	3–2 (a.e.t.)	England
10 July 2004
Spain	7–2	England
Italy	8–5	Norway
11 July 2004
Italy	2–4	Spain
England	2–3	Norway

==== Final standings ====
Pos	Team	Pld	W	W+	L	GF	GA	GD	Pts
1	Spain	3	3	0	0	20	6	+14	9
2	Italy	3	1	1	1	13	11	+2	5
3	Norway	3	1	0	2	10	22	−12	3
4	England	3	0	0	3	6	10	–4	0

Awards
Best player: (Spain) Amarelle
Top scorer(s): (Spain) David Cordón (7 goals)
Best goalkeeper: (Spain) Roberto Valeiro

=== Stage 3 ===
The third stage took place in Portimão, Portugal. The hosts earned their second stage crown.

==== Matches ====
16 July 2004
Spain	8–7	England
Portugal	4–6	Italy
17 July 2004
Portugal	10–2	England
Spain	7–3	Italy
18 July 2004
Italy	6–1	England
Portugal	5–4	Spain

==== Final standings ====
Pos	Team	Pld	W	W+	L	GF	GA	GD	Pts
1	Portugal	3	2	0	1	19	12	+7	6
2	Spain	3	2	0	1	19	15	+4	6
3	Italy	3	2	0	1	15	12	+3	6
4	England	3	0	0	3	10	24	–14	0

Awards
Best player: (Portugal) Alan
Top scorer(s): (Italy) Massimo Agostini, (Spain) Amarelle (7 goals)
Best goalkeeper: (Italy) Giuseppe Rasulo

=== Stage 4 ===
The fourth stage took place in Stavanger, Norway. A second stage victory was claimed by Spain.

==== Matches ====
23 July 2004
Norway	5–3	England
Spain	7–3	France
24 July 2004
Norway	4–7	France
Spain	11–3	England
25 July 2004
France	9–4	England
Norway	4–7	Spain

==== Final standings ====
Pos	Team	Pld	W	W+	L	GF	GA	GD	Pts
1	Spain	3	3	0	0	25	10	+15	9
2	France	3	2	0	1	19	15	+4	6
3	Norway	3	1	0	2	13	17	–4	3
4	England	3	0	0	3	10	25	–15	0

Awards
Best player: (Spain) Amarelle
Top scorer(s): (Spain) David Cordón (7 goals)
Best goalkeeper: (Spain) Roberto Valeiro

=== Stage 5 ===
The penultimate fifth stage took place in Palma de Mallorca, Mallorca, Spain. The hosts won their third stage title of the season. The Spanish also earned enough points during this stage to secure first place in the final division standings.

==== Matches ====
6 August 2004
France	4–3 (a.e.t.)	Portugal
Spain	5–4 (a.e.t.)	Norway
7 August 2004
Portugal	4–6	Norway
Spain	6–4	France
8 August 2004
France	4–3	Norway
Spain	7–5	Portugal

==== Final standings ====
Pos	Team	Pld	W	W+	L	GF	GA	GD	Pts
1	Spain	3	2	1	0	18	13	+5	8
2	France	3	1	1	1	12	12	0	5
3	Norway	3	1	0	2	13	13	0	3
4	Portugal	3	0	0	3	12	17	–5	0

Awards
Best player: (Spain) Manuel Bustillo
Top scorer(s): (Spain) David Cordón, (Norway) Jørn Larsen, (Portugal) Madjer (5 goals)
Best goalkeeper: (Norway) Karl Rossland

=== Stage 6 ===
The sixth and final stage was due to be the English stage of Division A, to be held in Brighton (originally to be stage 1 of the division, held at the end of June). However, the sponsors of the English event in previous years, Kronenbourg, and other potential sponsors, were deterred from investing in the event again due to this year's fixtures clashing with Euro 2004, in which it was believed audiences would be far more interested and therefore a risk to invest money into this event. Sky continued to offer TV coverage, but no new sponsor could be found, and so the stage was ultimately cancelled.

BSWW subsequently made an attempt to reorganise the stage as stage 6 in Catanzaro, Italy at the end of August, but this ultimately fell through too.

25–27 June (original); 24–26 August (reschedule)
England	Cancelled	France
Italy	Cancelled	Portugal
France	Cancelled	Portugal
England	Cancelled	Italy
England	Cancelled	Portugal
France	Cancelled	Italy

=== Final table ===
The top four teams qualified to the Superfinal. The final positions of the nations occupying first through fourth respectively determined seedings in the quarter-finals. Spain were crowned runaway winners of the division, earning the top seed in the Superfinal. France, finishing in the last qualifying position, claimed the lowest seed on offer in Division A.

Despite the teams playing different numbers of games due to stage 6 being cancelled, this ultimately proved inconsequential to the final league table since, after the completion of stage 5, Norway had no fixtures remaining and it was impossible for England to gain enough points in the final round of matches to move up into a Superfinal qualification spot. Hence the four qualifiers were confirmed at this point. If played, the matches of stage 6 would have been dead rubbers.

Pos	Team	Pld	W	W+	L	GF	GA	GD	Pts	Qualification
1	Spain	12	10	1	1	82	44	+38	32	Advance to Superfinal
2	Italy	9	5	1	3	45	41	+4	17	Advance to Superfinal
3	Portugal	9	4	1	4	52	45	+7	14	Advance to Superfinal
4	France	9	4	1	4	53	49	+4	14	Advance to Superfinal
5	Norway	12	3	0	9	48	66	–18	9	
6	England	9	0	0	9	24	59	–35	0	

== Division B ==
Like the top tier, Division B consisted of five rounds of fixtures known as stages, with one stage hosted in each of the five countries participating as shown. Four teams took part in each stage, with each nation participating in four of the five stages overall. In every round of fixtures the teams played each other once. The nation who earned the most points at the end of the stage was crowned stage winners.

At the end of the five stages all results were tallied up in a final league table.

=== Stage 1 ===
The first stage took place in Istanbul, Turkey. Belgium won the first stage of Division B.

==== Matches ====
9 July 2004
Turkey	5–6	Austria
Switzerland	5–3	Belgium
10 July 2004
Austria	3–6	Belgium
Turkey	4–1	Switzerland
11 July 2004
Austria	5–3	Switzerland
Turkey	2–5	Belgium

==== Final standings ====
Pos	Team	Pld	W	W+	L	GF	GA	GD	Pts
1	Belgium	3	2	0	1	14	10	+4	6
2	Austria	3	2	0	1	14	14	0	6
3	Turkey	3	1	0	2	11	12	–1	3
4	Switzerland	3	1	0	2	9	12	–3	3

Awards
Best player: (Belgium) Jimmy Fortemps
Top scorer(s): (Belgium) Mathieu Belme (8 goals)
Best goalkeeper: (Belgium) Jimmy Fortemps

=== Stage 2 ===
The second stage took place in Linz, Austria. Switzerland won the event.

==== Matches ====
16 July 2004
Austria	2–4	Switzerland
Turkey	7–4	Germany
17 July 2004
Austria	3–3 (a.e.t.); 2–1 (pens.)	Germany
Switzerland	5–2	Turkey
18 July 2004
Austria	5–4	Turkey
Germany	7–4	Switzerland

==== Final standings ====
Pos	Team	Pld	W	W+	L	GF	GA	GD	Pts
1	Switzerland	3	2	0	1	13	11	+2	6
2	Austria	3	1	1	1	10	11	–1	5
3	Turkey	3	1	0	2	13	14	–1	3
4	Germany	3	1	0	2	14	14	+1	3

Awards
Best player: (Austria) David Wimleitner
Top scorer(s): (Germany) Markus Högi (6 goals)
Best goalkeeper: (Switzerland) Nico Jung

=== Stage 3 ===
The third stage took place in Palma de Mallorca, Spain, alongside the running of the Division A and C events. Austria claimed their first stage win.

==== Matches ====
6 August 2004
Belgium	3–2	Turkey
Germany	6–5	Austria
7 August 2004
Austria	8–4	Belgium
Germany	7–5	Turkey
8 August 2004
Germany	5–6	Belgium
Austria	4–2	Turkey

==== Final standings ====
Pos	Team	Pld	W	W+	L	GF	GA	GD	Pts
1	Austria	3	2	0	1	17	12	+5	6
2	Germany	3	2	0	1	18	16	+2	6
3	Belgium	3	2	0	1	13	15	–2	6
4	Turkey	3	0	0	3	9	14	–5	0

Awards
Best player: (N/A) ?
Top scorer(s): (Germany) Stefano Mari (8 goals)
Best goalkeeper: (Austria) David Wimleitner

=== Stage 4 ===
The fourth and next to last stage took place in Interlaken, Switzerland. The hosts won their second stage crown.

==== Matches ====
13 August 2004
Germany	7–2	Turkey
Switzerland	8–6	Belgium
14 August 2004
Switzerland	12–9	Germany
Turkey	5–8	Belgium
15 August 2004
Belgium	6–8	Germany
Switzerland	9–5	Turkey

==== Final standings ====
Pos	Team	Pld	W	W+	L	GF	GA	GD	Pts
1	Switzerland	3	3	0	0	29	20	+9	9
2	Germany	3	2	0	1	24	20	+4	6
3	Belgium	3	1	0	2	20	21	–1	3
4	Turkey	3	0	0	3	12	24	–12	0

Awards
Best player: (Switzerland) Stephan Leu
Top scorer(s): (Germany) Stefano Mari, (Switzerland) Stephan Meier (13 goals)
Best goalkeeper: (Switzerland) Nico Jung

=== Stage 5 ===
The fifth and final stage took place in Brussels, Belgium. The hosts won the event, their second of the season, and secured the division title after beating Germany on the final day.

==== Matches ====
20 August 2004
Belgium	6–3	Switzerland
Austria	5–6	Germany
21 August 2004
Switzerland	10–1	Germany
Belgium	3–2	Austria
22 August 2004
Belgium	6–4	Germany
Switzerland	3–4	Austria

==== Final standings ====
Pos	Team	Pld	W	W+	L	GF	GA	GD	Pts
1	Belgium	3	3	0	0	15	9	+6	9
2	Switzerland	3	1	0	2	16	11	+5	3
3	Austria	3	1	0	2	11	12	–1	3
4	Germany	3	1	0	2	11	21	–10	3

Awards
Best player: (N/A) ?
Top scorer(s): (Switzerland) Stephan Meier (8 goals)
Best goalkeeper: (Belgium) Jimmy Fortemps

=== Final table ===
The top three teams qualified to the Superfinal. The final positions of the nations occupying first through third respectively determined seedings in the quarter-finals. The remaining Division B nations exited this season's EBSL.

Belgium were crowned winners. Switzerland and Austria were the other two successful teams, the latter qualifying ahead of Germany by a slim margin.

Pos	Team	Pld	W	W+	L	GF	GA	GD	Pts	Qualification
1	Belgium	12	8	0	4	62	55	+7	24	Advance to Superfinal
2	Switzerland	12	7	0	5	67	54	+13	21	Advance to Superfinal
3	Austria	12	6	1	5	52	49	+3	20	Advance to Superfinal
4	Germany	12	6	0	6	67	71	–4	18	
5	Turkey	12	2	0	10	45	64	–19	6	

== Division C ==
=== Results ===
- Dates: 6–8 August 2004
- Location: Palma de Mallorca, Spain

The inaugural season of Division C was played as a straight knockout tournament. All teams contesting the division started in the quarter-finals, playing one match per round until the final when the winner was crowned. The losers of the quarter-finals played in consolation matches to determine their final division placements.

Slovenia withdrew immediately prior to the start of the event, giving Poland a walkover into the semi-finals, Monaco a bye in the consolation matches with no opponent to face, and meant there was no seventh place play-off.

Fifth place
Monaco	2
Greece	4
7th place
Sweden	w/o
Slovenia

Consolation semifinals
Slovenia
Monaco	w/o
Greece	7
Sweden	2

Quarterfinals
Poland	w/o^{1}
Slovenia
Hungary	12
Monaco	1
Netherlands	4
Greece	1
Ukraine	8
Sweden	2

Semifinals
Poland	2
Hungary	6
Netherlands	2
Ukraine	6

Final
Hungary	2
Ukraine	5
Third place
Poland	10
Netherlands	6

Awards
Best player: (Ukraine) Viktor Moroz
Top scorer(s): (Hungary) Ferenc Besenyei (8 goals)
Best goalkeeper: (Greece) Evangelos Vogiantzis

=== Final standings ===
The winner of the division qualified into the Superfinal quarter-finals. The remaining Division C nations exited this season's EBSL.

Ukraine won the Division C tournament title, comfortably beating Hungary in the final. Since they withdrew, Slovenia did not receive a placing.

Rank	Team	Qualification
1st place, gold medalist(s)	Ukraine	Advance to Superfinal
2nd place, silver medalist(s)	Hungary	
3rd place, bronze medalist(s)	Poland	
4	Netherlands	
5	Greece	
6	Monaco	
7	Sweden	

== Superfinal ==
=== Qualified teams ===
This is a summary of the teams who qualified for the Superfinal.

Seed	Team	Division	Round entered
1	Spain	A	Quarter-finals
2	Italy	A	Quarter-finals
3	Portugal	A	Quarter-finals
4	France	A	Quarter-finals
5	Belgium	B	Quarter-finals
6	Switzerland	B	Quarter-finals
7	Austria	B	Quarter-finals
8	Ukraine	C	Quarter-finals

=== Results ===
- Dates: 3–5 September 2004
- Location: Monte Carlo, Monaco

This season the Superfinal was played as a straight knockout tournament. All eight teams contesting the title started in the quarter-finals, playing one match per round until the final when the winner of the 2004 Euro Beach Soccer League was crowned. The losers of the quarter-finals played in consolation matches to determine their final league placements.

Fifth place
1	Spain	8
6	Switzerland	4
Seventh place
5	Belgium	9
7	Austria	3

Consolation semifinals
1	Spain	9
5	Belgium	3
6	Switzerland	12
7	Austria	5

Quarterfinals
1	Spain	3
8	Ukraine	5
4	Portugal	10
5	Belgium	7
3	France	10
6	Switzerland	9
7	Austria	5
2	Italy	14

Semifinals
4	Portugal	7
8	Ukraine	4
3	France	9
2	Italy	2

Final
4	Portugal	3
3	France	6
Third place
8	Ukraine	5
2	Italy	3

=== Championship match details ===
5 September 2004
20:00

Portugal	3–6	France
Madjer 2', 13'; Alan 25'	Report	1', 33' Sansoni; 4' Cardoso; 11', 23', 31' Samoun

Monte Carlo, Monaco

==== Winners ====
2004 Euro Beach Soccer League
champions

France
First title

Statistics
Top scorer(s): (Switzerland) Angelo Schirinzi, (Portugal) Madjer (11 goals)
Best goalkeeper: (Ukraine) Vladyslav Lysenko (82.7% save rate)

=== Superfinal final standings ===
France beat Portugal in the final to win their first Euro Beach Soccer League title.

The success of the three nations finishing in the podium positions meant they earned qualification for the upcoming FIFA Beach Soccer World Cup. The teams in fourth through seventh place competed in a final play off stage to decide which nation would gain the remaining berth at the World Cup.

Pos	Team	Notes	Qualification
1	France	EBSL Champions	Qualified to 2005 FIFA Beach Soccer World Cup
2	Portugal	Runners-up	Qualified to 2005 FIFA Beach Soccer World Cup
3	Ukraine	Third place	Qualified to 2005 FIFA Beach Soccer World Cup
4	Italy		Advanced to World Cup qualification play-off
5	Spain		Advanced to World Cup qualification play-off
6	Switzerland		Advanced to World Cup qualification play-off
7	Belgium		Advanced to World Cup qualification play-off
8	Austria		

== Sources ==
- Roonba
- BSWW archive
- RSSSF
