= Éric Cantona bank run call (2010) =

The Éric Cantona bank run call of 7 December 2010 was initiated by Yann Sarfati and Arnaud Varnier, quickly joined by Géraldine Feuillien, following their viewing of an interview on the Presse-Océan website with former French football player Éric Cantona, who spoke on 6 October 2010 about “How to make a Revolution”. Relayed in France and in several other countries by groups of internet users, this call became a media phenomenon on Internet, and was then covered by traditional media in France and in several European countries. It prompted reactions, generally negative, from finance professionals (the Belgian Financial Sector Federation, the CEO of BNP Paribas, the chairman of BPCE and of the French Banking Federation), political figures (the French Minister of the Economy, Christine Lagarde, the Budget Minister François Baroin), as well as leaders of political parties (Jean-Luc Mélenchon, Cécile Duflot).

On 7 December 2010, almost all major banking networks stated that they had observed no particular movement following the call on Facebook by Arnaud Varnier and Yann Sarfati. For his part, Éric Cantona made a symbolic withdrawal at the bank in Péronne. No quantified information on the impact of the monetary withdrawals carried out by supporters of this call for a bank run on 7 December 2010 was provided by the Agence France-Presse.

== The call ==
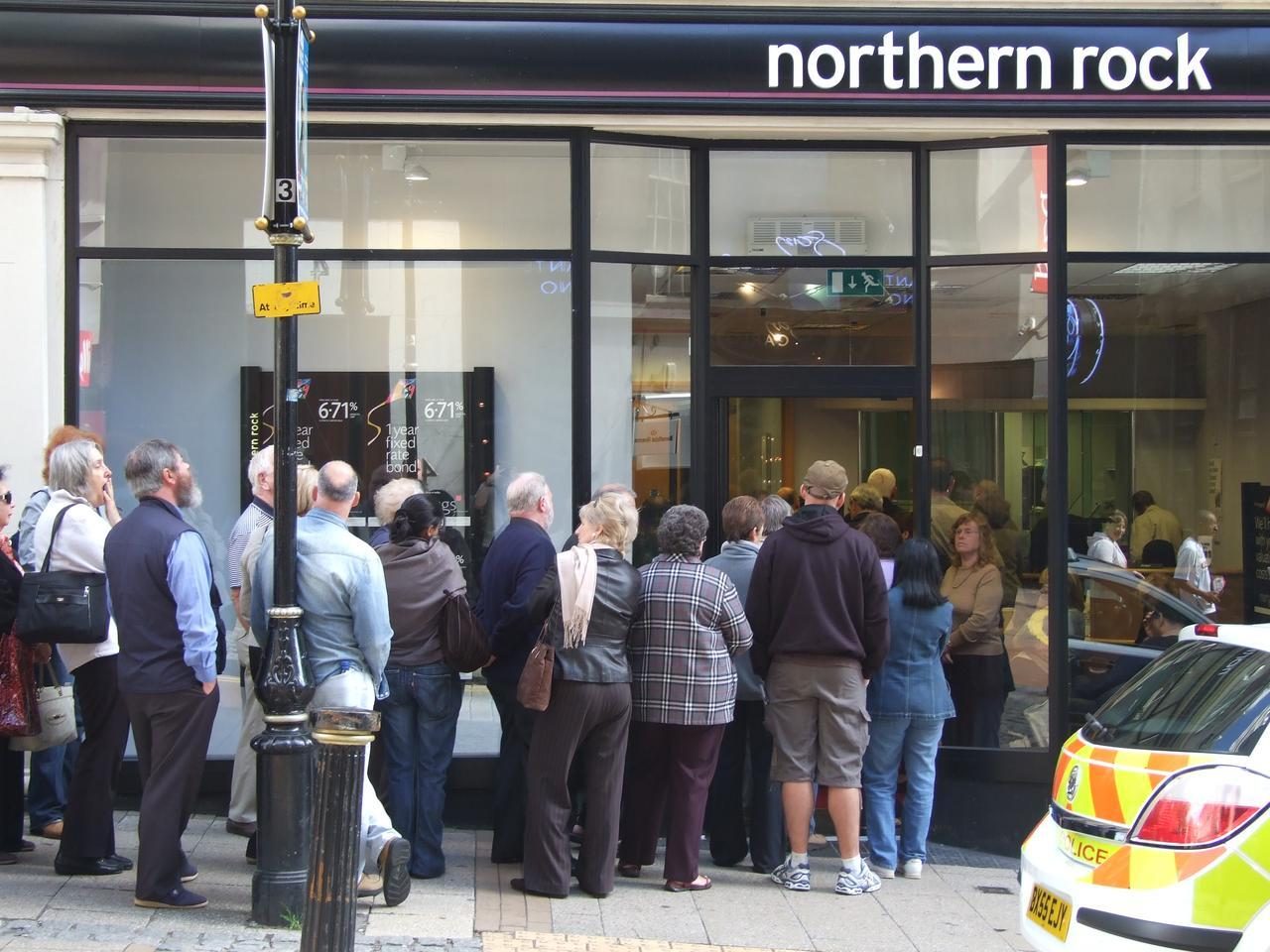
A bank run in 2007, in Birmingham, illustrating a phenomenon that inspired the call.

Éric Cantona had suggested the possibility of carrying out a non-violent revolution through a massive withdrawal of money deposited in banks by citizens. In his view, the aim was to provoke a collapse of the banking system:

If there are 20 million people who withdraw their money, the system collapses [...] The revolution takes place through the banks

The idea of provoking a bank run was launched by Arnaud Varnier and Yann Sarfati. by creating an event on Facebook a few days after watching Cantona's video in which he spoke about revolution (the video then had only a few hundred views; the buzz arose from the initiative to revive this action on a specific date). The two young men, who were already active in the Stopbanque collective, set the date for 7 December, which they considered sufficient time (one and a half months) to publicize the action and generate a buzz. They were joined by Géraldine Feuillien. a few days after the event was created. Bankrun was the main website of the movement, although it was not official. The action was also very actively taken up by Stopbanque.

Several Facebook “events” were created and translated into more than twenty languages by supporters. It was described as a citizen initiative not linked to any political movement, according to Géraldine Feuillien and Yann Sarfati, who launched a dedicated website for the occasion in order to coordinate the action and attempt to give it a global scale. Géraldine Feuillien has, however, regularly expressed sympathy on internet forums for Marine Le Pen and other figures classified on the far right.

The call received some support from intellectuals in the United States, notably economics professor Robert Prasch (Middlebury College) and Italian-American economic forecaster Gerald Celente. His compatriot, financial analyst Max Keiser, who had already in November been encouraging individuals to buy silver coins in order to target and bring down JPMorgan Chase., also invited his followers to take part in the action by emptying their accounts to buy silver or gold coins, whose prices, he claimed, were being artificially kept low by the markets.

== Media phenomenon ==
In late November, the call to withdraw personal funds deposited in banks became a media phenomenon on Internet, as the video of the appeal achieved success on video-sharing platforms.

It was followed by a withdrawal call launched on Facebook, with 34,500 registered participants, the creation of dedicated websites, and the mention of the idea in numerous forum discussions.

According to the French daily Le Figaro,

34,000 internet users had signed up to the Facebook account dedicated to the Bankrun 2010 committee as of 4 December 2010.

At the beginning of December, the French financial daily La Tribune referred to the buzz generated by Éric Cantona's call, with hundreds of thousands of views, while also noting doubts regarding the likelihood of the project's success.

The traditional press in several European countries covered the topic. This phenomenon led to mostly negative reactions from political decision-makers. and economic actors, particularly in France.

Some media outlets raised questions about the feasibility of the action and the possibility of achieving the stated objectives. Reactions from certain press cartoonists were highly biting and caustic regarding the ongoing phenomenon.

== Reaction from critical circles toward the banking system ==
Political figures critical of the liberal economy adopted an ambivalent stance toward this call, which falls under forms of political activism outside traditional institutional frameworks and does not originate from the political sphere.

Cécile Duflot, national secretary of Europe Ecology–The Greens, stated on 1 December on the television channel Public Sénat that this call

puts its finger on an issue that is a real issue

and added:

I am not sure it is the right method, but it clearly shows that there is beginning to be a real sense of fed-upness regarding this situation.

The leader of the Left Party, Jean-Luc Mélenchon, stated on France Info radio on 3 December:

I do not know whether we would gain anything from a general and immediate collapse of the system. [...] But at the same time, I do not lose sight of the fact that Cantona [...] shows that this system is a paper tiger.

Olivier Besancenot, spokesperson for the NPA, emphasized that

attacking banks is only part of the problem

and that

the reality is that many of those who would dream of doing so no longer necessarily have money in their bank accounts.

The economist Frédéric Lordon, while considering a public takeover of banks by state authorities to be essential, stated that if “Cantona thinks he can make a non-violent revolution by collapsing the banks [...] it is because he has no idea of the violence of the material chaos that would follow”.

For Guillaume Duval, editor-in-chief of Alternatives économiques,

the resonance this call has encountered reflects the justified exasperation that has taken hold of the public in view of the considerable damage caused by deregulated finance and the post-crisis arrogance of financiers apparently incapable of reforming themselves. But in the current European context, adding crisis to crisis is more likely to worsen the situation of ordinary citizens than to punish bankers.

For the economist Bernard Maris,

it will be small depositors who symbolically carry this out, and there will be relatively few of them,

while nevertheless expressing his

sympathy for this call.

== Reaction from public authorities ==
Government members downplayed the call by focusing their criticism on the personality of its initiator. French Minister of Economy Christine Lagarde thus rejected Éric Cantona's appeal on Wednesday 1 December 2010:

Mr Cantona is not short of provocations. He is an immense footballer, but I am not sure it is appropriate to follow all his suggestions either. [...] To each their profession: some play football magnificently, I would not risk doing so, and I believe everyone should act within their area of competence.

Her reaction was followed by a similar one from François Baroin, Minister of the Budget and government spokesperson, who stated on RMC radio on 2 December that the call was

not serious [...] it would be comical if it were not tragic.

Roselyne Bachelot commented that Éric Cantona advertises “cars, razors” and that “his wife advertises for a banking system” (Crédit Lyonnais), concluding: “One must have a sense of responsibility in life when one is precisely one of the standard-bearers of consumer society”.

== Reaction from the financial sector ==
Reactions from financial executives took several forms.

Some highlighted the risk posed by the initiative. This was the case in the Belgian financial sector. According to the Belgian news website 7sur7.be on 1 December:

This call may once again cause problems for banks

, the financial sector federation Febelfin stated on Wednesday in Het Nieuwsblad and De Standaard. [...]

This action could destabilize our financial system, which is fragile

, said Michel Vermaerke, managing director of Febelfin.

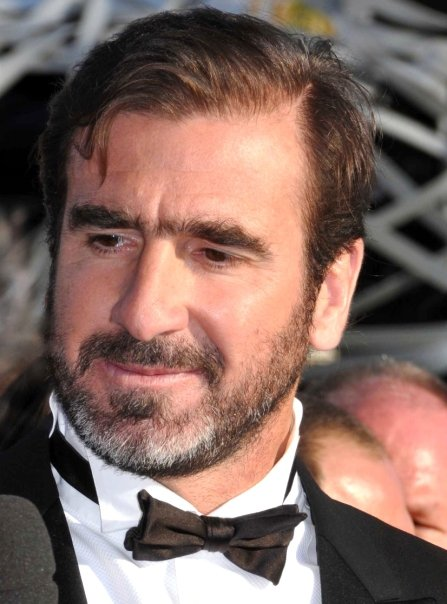
Éric Cantona in 2009.

Baudouin Prot, chief executive officer of BNP Paribas, the second-largest bank in the eurozone, stated on 2 December that

The recommendation to withdraw deposits is totally unsafe [and] completely contrary to what can ensure the functioning of the economy.

Former investment banker Marc Fiorentino, chairman of the financial engineering firm Euroland Finance, stated in Libération on 1 December 2010 that it was

the first truly revolutionary initiative that is practical and realistic since the beginning of the crisis. [...] Withdrawing deposits is indeed an effective way to bring down the system.

Other executives preferred to downplay the risk that such a general withdrawal movement could represent. This was notably the case of François Pérol, chairman of BPCE (France's second-largest banking group) and, at the time, of the French Banking Federation (FBF). He stated on 2 December that the call

does not serve anyone

, while adding that

it does not constitute a threat to French financial institutions.

The deputy chief executive officer of retail banking at Société Générale stated:

There is nothing worse in history than a bank run

, adding that

withdrawing your money from banks is extremely dangerous both for oneself (..) and would also be dramatic for the entire system.

The economist Philippe Waechter, director of economic studies at Natixis Asset Management (part of the BPCE group), stated on 1 December on the website of the newspaper Libération that

the question is whether this can generate a dynamic of withdrawals, whether people will be impressed by the images of queues in front of banks, and therefore whether this could trigger a bank run.

By contrast, reactions did not appear to be so uniformly negative on the side of bank employee trade unions. According to the secretary of the FO Banque union, in the French daily La Tribune on 6 December,

there is a lot of talk about Cantona’s call in branches, and overall employees agree that the banking system must be forced to change.

The secretary of the National Banking Union, for his part, believed that the postponement of sector wage negotiations was due to the proximity of the date of the “Cantona call”.

The fact that the issue of bank runs remains a concern for financial institutions is illustrated by reflections on the potentially amplified impact that, in this third decade of the 21st century, the intensification of digital money transfers and calls made via social networks could have on such phenomena.

== Extensions of the call ==
Although the “empty the banks” appeal was considered, from the standpoint of its stated objective, a failure, activist organizations, such as the collective Sauvons les riches (Save the Rich) suggested continuing the movement in another form by calling for savings to be withdrawn from traditional banks in favour of ethically oriented institutions (Crédit coopératif—itself nevertheless a member of the BPCE group), La Nef) or those that were formerly public services (La Banque postale).

The call to change banks led to an increase in telephone inquiries to these institutions. According to Crédit coopératif, on the Tuesday following the call, 1,500 individuals phoned to request information about opening accounts. On 5 January, the AFP reported 3,500 calls.

La Nef reported a number of calls “multiplied by ten since the beginning of the week” and 200 new clients per month since the beginning of the crisis.

According to Midi Libre, Éric Cantona's call reportedly sparked “a great deal of reflection” in the “global village”.

== See also ==
- List of bank runs
- Éric Cantona
