= 2007 Euro Beach Soccer League – Last chance bracket =

2007 EBSL Last Chance Bracket
Tournament details
- Dates: 23 August – 26 August
- Teams: 12 (from 1 confederation)

Final positions
- Champions: Italy
- Runners-up: Switzerland

Tournament statistics
- Matches played: 11
- Goals scored: 105 (9.55 per match)

The 2007 Euro Beach Soccer League – Last chance bracket, simply known as the Last chance bracket was an additional round of the 2007 Euro Beach Soccer League (EBSL) that was specially organised to determine the fifth and final European nation that would qualify for the 2007 FIFA Beach Soccer World Cup. The event was organised by Beach Soccer Worldwide (BSWW), in parallel with the staging of the 2007 EBSL Superfinal, taking place during the same dates (23–26 August) and in the same location of Marseille, France.

Five berths were allocated to European teams in the 2007 FIFA Beach Soccer World Cup, four of which were filled when Portugal, Spain, Russia and France reached the semi-finals of the Superfinal. This meant there was still one final berth at the World Cup to be filled. As in 2006, in order to decide which nation would get this fifth and final spot at the World Cup, BSWW decided the prospective nations would compete in a knockout tournament called the Last chance bracket, with the winner claiming the final World Cup ticket.

Italy won the event by beating Switzerland in the final and claimed the last remaining World Cup berth.

The last chance bracket was retired from use after this edition due to the establishment of a dedicated World Cup qualifying competition for UEFA nations the following year.

== Teams ==
This round of the 2007 EBSL was a distinctly separate and unique event from the regular structure of the league, but nevertheless related to the league since it involved inviting back teams previously knocked out of World Cup qualifying contention during this year's EBSL to compete in the event for a second chance at qualification, as well as four wild-card entries, as listed below.

From the Preliminary round

These nations were eliminated from the EBSL in the preliminary round

- Germany
- Hungary
- Norway
- Turkey
- Ukraine

From Division A

These nations competed in Division A but failed to qualify for the Superfinal

- Poland

From the Superfinal

These nations finished in 5th and 6th in the Superfinal

- Italy
- Switzerland

Wild-cards

These nations had not yet competed in this year's EBSL until this point

- Austria
- Bulgaria
- Estonia
- Romania

== Results ==
The success of teams in this season's EBSL also affected what round the nations began their last chance bracket campaign's in as follows:

- With the least credentials, the four wild cards and four of the five Preliminary round teams who failed to qualify for Division A started in the first round. (Germany received a bye into the quarter-finals because there were too many wild card and preliminary round nations to all enter the 1st round)
- With the most credentials, the Division A nation which failed to make the Superfinal, and the two who were knocked out in the group stage of the Superfinal, received a bye in the first round, and entered straight into the quarter-finals (along with Germany as explained above)

First round
WC	Bulgaria	2
WC	Austria	7
PR	Ukraine	3
WC	Estonia	1
PR	Turkey	6
PR	Norway	7
PR	Hungary	4
WC	Romania	2

Quarter-finals
A3	Switzerland	13
WC	Austria	5
DA	Poland	4
PR	Ukraine	5
PR	Germany	6
PR	Norway	2
B3	Italy	6
PR	Hungary	1

Semi-finals
A3	Switzerland	6
PR	Ukraine	5
PR	Germany	3
B3	Italy	4

Finals
A3	Switzerland	5
B3	Italy	8

Key:

A3 This team finished 3rd in group A of the group stage of the Superfinal
B3 This team finished 3rd in group B of the group stage of the Superfinal
DA indicates this team was knocked out of the EBSL at the end of the Division A regular season
PR indicates this team was knocked out of the EBSL at the end of the Preliminary round
WC indicates a wild-card entry (these teams had not competed in the 2007 EBSL until this point)

== World Cup qualifiers ==
The following table shows the five nations qualified to the 2007 World Cup and their qualification route.

№	Nation	Qualification route
1	Portugal	Superfinal semifinalists
2	France	Superfinal semifinalists
3	Russia	Superfinal semifinalists
4	Spain	Superfinal semifinalists
5	Italy	Last chance bracket Winners

== Sources ==
- Roonba
- RSSSF
