= Inside United =

Manchester United football club official magazine

- The cover of the November 2009 issue of Inside United (#208) featuring Patrice Evra.
- Editor-in-chief: Ian McLeish (2006–)
- Former editors: Former editors James Freedman (1992–1996); Faith Mowbray (1996–1998); Justyn Barnes (1998–2000); Aubrey Ganguly (2000–2002); Sarah Shaddick (2002–2005); Rob Clark (2005–2006)
- Categories: Sport
- Frequency: Monthly
- Total circulation (2009): 36,110 (ABC)
- First issue: 5 November 1992
- Company: Future plc (1999–2006); Haymarket Network (2006–2013); SportMediaShop (2013–)
- Country: United Kingdom
- Based in: Manchester
- Language: English
- ISSN: 1749-6497

Inside United (known as Manchester United from 1992 to 2000, and as United from 2000 to 2006) is the official magazine of the English football club Manchester United. Issues are published every four weeks, resulting in 13 issues per year. The editor is Ian McLeish, who became editor-in-chief for the February 2006 issue, after the title was purchased by the Haymarket Network from Future plc. The magazine is written in conjunction with the club's official match programme – United Review – and the club website – ManUtd.com.

Former contributors to the magazine include ex-United manager Alex Ferguson and the club's Academy director, Brian McClair, who both wrote monthly columns. Also included in the magazine are reports on the club's matches in the previous month, as well as information about the reserve and youth teams. Features often include interviews with players, both past and present, and examinations of the club's history.
