= Joël Cantona =

French footballer (born 1967)

Personal information
- Date of birth: 26 October 1967 (age 59)
- Place of birth: Marseille, France
- Height: 1.82 m (6 ft 0 in)
- Position: Defender

Youth career
- 1982–1985: Marseille

Senior career*
Years	Team	Apps	(Gls)
1985–1987	Marseille	3	(1)
1987	Rennes		
1988	CS Meaux		
1989	Royal Antwerp		
1989–1991	Angers		
1991	La Rochelle		
1991	Sainte-Suzanne		
1992–1993	CS Meaux		
1993	Újpest	13	(1)
1993	Peterborough United	0	(0)
1993–1994	Stockport County	3	(0)
1994–1996	Marseille	24	(3)
- * Club domestic league appearances and goals

Joël Cantona (born 26 October 1967) is a French former professional footballer who played as a defender. He is the younger brother of Eric Cantona. Since retiring he has had some minor acting roles.
