= 2007 Euro Beach Soccer League =

Tournament details
- Dates: 29 June – 26 August
- Teams: 16 (from 1 confederation)
- Venue(s): 6 (in 6 host cities)

Final positions
- Champions: Portugal (2nd title)
- Runners-up: France
- Third place: Russia
- Fourth place: Spain

Tournament statistics
- Matches played: 70
- Goals scored: 612 (8.74 per match)
- Top scorer(s): (Switzerland) Dejan Stankovic (Spain) Amarelle
- Best player(s): (Switzerland) Dejan Stankovic
- Best goalkeeper: (Russia) Andrey Bukhlitskiy

The lead sponsors of the previous three seasons, Mastercard, ended their sponsorship going into the 2007 season. To reflect this, the Mastercard logo was removed from the EBSL logo as a whole, leaving the remaining plain logo, without an accompanying sponsor, as the league’s insignia. This logo was also used in 2008.

The 2007 Euro Beach Soccer League, was the tenth edition of the Euro Beach Soccer League (EBSL), the premier beach soccer competition contested between European men's national teams, occurring annually since its establishment in 1998. The league was organised by Beach Soccer Worldwide (BSWW) between June 29 and August 26, 2007 in six different nations across Europe.

Changes made to the structure of the league in 2006 remained in place for this season. However, there were some notable adjustments to the organisation of Division B – the lower tier season was shortened dramatically to just one round of matches involving all nations and hence was renamed as the Preliminary round for this season.

Spain entered the tournament as defending champions but lost to Portugal in the Superfinal semi-finals. The Portuguese proceeded to win the title, beating France in the final to claim their second European crown, having first won five years prior in 2002. This was France's third runner-up finish in the EBSL and their last top four placing to date.

The league also doubled as the European qualification process for the 2007 FIFA Beach Soccer World Cup. The nations finishing in first, second, third and fourth place qualified, along with the winners of the last chance bracket.

== Preliminary round (Division B) ==
Traditionally known as Division B, the lower tier of teams' competition was called the Preliminary Round this season.

It took place prior to the Division A season. The event decided which four nations would advance to play in Division A later in the year alongside the top tier's automatic entrants.

For this season, BSWW discarded the traditional multi-stage regular season for lower tier nations. In place of this was organised a single round of matches to decide those to progress to Division A. Since the division consisted of just one stage of fixtures, all 12 teams participated, split into four groups of three, competing in a round robin format.

Unlike in previous years, the overall division table did not determine the successful teams to progress to the next stage of their EBSL campaign. Instead, each of the four group winners secured a place in Division A.

The preliminary round took place in Athens, Greece.

=== Teams ===
- Czech Republic
- England
- Germany
- Greece
- Hungary
- Israel
- Norway
- Poland
- Russia
- Switzerland
- Turkey
- Ukraine

Key

Advance to Division A

=== Group A ===
Pos	Team	Pld	W	W+	L	GF	GA	GD	Pts
1	Switzerland	2	2	0	0	21	5	+16	6
2	Norway	2	0	1	1	5	13	−8	2
3	Turkey	2	0	0	2	6	14	−8	0

Results
29 June 2007	Norway	2–10	Switzerland
30 June 2007	Turkey	3–3 (a.e.t.); 2–3 (pens.)	Norway
1 July 2007	Switzerland	11–3	Turkey

=== Group B ===
Pos	Team	Pld	W	W+	L	GF	GA	GD	Pts
1	Russia	2	1	1	0	11	7	+4	5
2	Israel	2	1	0	1	8	7	+1	3
3	Greece	2	0	0	2	2	7	−5	0

Results
29 June 2007	Israel	6–6 (a.e.t.); 6–7 (pens.)	Russia
30 June 2007	Greece	1–2	Israel
1 July 2007	Greece	1–5	Russia

=== Group C ===
Pos	Team	Pld	W	W+	L	GF	GA	GD	Pts
1	Czech Republic	2	2	0	0	8	6	+2	6
2	Ukraine	2	1	0	1	8	6	+2	3
3	Germany	2	0	0	2	5	9	−4	0

Results
29 June 2007	Ukraine	3–4	Czech Rep.
30 June 2007	Czech Rep.	4–3	Germany
1 July 2007	Germany	2–5	Ukraine

=== Group D ===
Pos	Team	Pld	W	W+	L	GF	GA	GD	Pts
1	Poland	2	1	0	1	10	7	+3	3
2	England	2	1	0	1	8	7	+1	3
3	Hungary	2	0	1	1	5	9	−4	2

Results
29 June 2007	Hungary	1–5	England
30 June 2007	Poland	4–4 (a.e.t.); 0–1 (pens.)	Hungary
1 July 2007	England	3–6	Poland

== Division A ==
Following the completion of Division B, Division A commenced.

Division A consisted of four rounds of fixtures known as stages, with one stage hosted in each of the four nations which received automatic entry into the division. All eight teams took part in each stage.

Each stage was played as a straight knockout tournament. All eight teams contesting the stage title started in the quarter-finals, playing one match per round until the final when the winner of the stage was crowned. The losers of the quarter and semi-finals played in consolation matches to determine their final league placements.

=== Point distribution ===
Unlike in previous years, points earned by the participating teams for winning matches did not count towards league table. Instead, the system of awarding points established last season in 2006 continued to be used (with minor alterations) – teams earned points for the league table based on their final placement in each stage from 10 points for winning the stage, down to 1 point for finishing last.

The breakdown of the distribution of points is shown in the table below:

Rank	Pts	Rank	Pts
1st	10 pts.	5th	5 pts.
2nd	8 pts.	6th	4 pts.
3rd	7 pts.	7th	3 pts.
4th	6 pts.	8th	1 pt.

=== Teams ===
==== Automatic entrants ====
- France
- Italy
- Portugal
- Spain

==== Division B qualifiers ====
- Czech Republic
- Poland
- Russia
- Switzerland

=== Stage 1 ===
The first stage of Division A took place in San Benedetto del Tronto, Italy.

- Dates: QFs – 13 July; SFs – 14 July; Finals – 15 July

==== Results ====
Fifth place
France	10
Czech Republic	2
7th place match
Spain	4
Poland (a.e.t.)	5

5th–8th place semifinals
Spain	6
France (a.e.t.)	7
Czech Republic	6
Poland	5

Quarterfinals
Spain	4
Switzerland (a.e.t.)	5
France	1
Russia	4
Italy	4
Czech Republic	2
Portugal	5
Poland	4

Semifinals
Switzerland	4
Russia	5
Italy	2
Portugal	7

Final
Russia	4
Portugal	3
Third place
Switzerland	5
Italy	3

==== Awards ====
Award	Player
Best player	(Russia) Egor Shaykov
Top scorer(s)	(Spain) Amarelle (8 goals)
Best goalkeeper	(Russia) Andrey Bukhlitskiy

==== Final standings ====
Rank	Team	Points earned
1st place, gold medalist(s)	Russia	10
2nd place, silver medalist(s)	Portugal	8
3rd place, bronze medalist(s)	Switzerland	7
4	Italy	6
5	France	5
6	Czech Republic	4
7	Poland	3
8	Spain	1

=== Stage 2 ===
The second stage of Division A took place in Portimão, Portugal.

- Dates: QFs – 19 July; SFs – 20 July; Finals – 21 July

==== Results ====
Fifth place
Poland	0
Spain	1
7th place match
Czech Republic	1
Italy	4

5th–8th place semifinals
Czech Republic	4
Poland	7
Spain	7
Italy	4

Quarterfinals
Czech Republic	4
Portugal	7
Poland	2
France	4
Russia	4
Spain	3
Italy	1 (2)
Switzerland (p)	1 (3)

Semifinals
Portugal	6
France	1
Russia	7
Switzerland	3

Final
Portugal	3
Russia	2
Third place
France	6
Switzerland	4

==== Awards ====
Award	Player
Best player	(Portugal) Alan
Top scorer(s)	(Portugal) Madjer (7 goals)
Best goalkeeper	(Russia) Andrey Bukhlitskiy

==== Final standings ====
Rank	Team	Points earned
1st place, gold medalist(s)	Portugal	10
2nd place, silver medalist(s)	Russia	8
3rd place, bronze medalist(s)	France	7
4	Switzerland	6
5	Spain	5
6	Poland	4
7	Italy	3
8	Czech Republic	1

=== Stage 3 ===
The third stage of Division A took place in Tignes, France.

- Dates: QFs – 27 July; SFs – 28 July; Finals – 29 July

==== Results ====
Fifth place
Portugal	6
Poland (a.e.t.)	7
7th place match
Italy	11
Czech Republic	2

5th–8th place semifinals
Portugal	8
Italy	6
Czech Republic	4
Poland	6

Quarterfinals
Portugal	7
Switzerland	8
Russia	4
Italy	1
France	4
Czech Republic	2
Spain	3
Poland	2

Semifinals
Switzerland	4
Russia	5
France	5
Spain	2

Final
Russia	5
France	4
Third place
Switzerland	3
Spain	4

==== Awards ====
Award	Player
Best player	(Switzerland) Dejan Stankovic
Top scorer(s)	(Portugal) Madjer (10 goals)
Best goalkeeper	(Russia) Andrey Bukhlitskiy

==== Final standings ====
Rank	Team	Points earned
1st place, gold medalist(s)	Russia	10
2nd place, silver medalist(s)	France	8
3rd place, bronze medalist(s)	Spain	7
4	Switzerland	6
5	Poland	5
6	Portugal	4
7	Italy	3
8	Czech Republic	1

=== Stage 4 ===
The fourth stage of Division A took place in Palma de Mallorca, Mallorca, Spain.

- Dates: QFs – 3 August; SFs – 4 August; Finals – 5 August

==== Results ====
Fifth place
Switzerland (a.e.t.)	6
Poland	5
7th place match
Russia	6
Czech Republic	3

5th–8th place semifinals
Russia	4
Switzerland	5
Czech Republic	4
Poland	6

Quarterfinals
Portugal (a.e.t.)	6
Russia	4
France	7
Switzerland	4
Czech Republic	2
Spain	5
Poland	3
Italy	4

Semifinals
Portugal	0
France	6
Spain	4
Italy	6

Final
France	7
Italy	5
Third place
Portugal	5
Spain	3

==== Awards ====
Award	Player
Best player	(France) Jérémy Basquaise
Top scorer(s)	(Switzerland) Dejan Stankovic (8 goals)
Best goalkeeper	(France) Jean-Marie Aubry

==== Final standings ====
Rank	Team	Points earned
1st place, gold medalist(s)	France	10
2nd place, silver medalist(s)	Italy	8
3rd place, bronze medalist(s)	Portugal	7
4	Spain	6
5	Switzerland	5
6	Poland	4
7	Russia	3
8	Czech Republic	1

=== Final table ===
Following the completion of all four stages, the final Division A table was drawn up. The top six nations qualified for the Superfinal.

Pos	Match stats									Points earned per stage				Total points	Qualification
Pos	Team	Pld	W	W+	L	GF	GA	GD	Pts	Stage 1	Stage 2	Stage 3	Stage 4	Total points	Qualification
1	Russia	12	9	0	3	54	40	+14	27	10	8	10	3	31	Advance to Superfinal
2	France	12	8	1	3	62	42	+20	26	5	7	8	10	30	Advance to Superfinal
3	Portugal	12	7	1	4	63	51	+12	23	8	10	4	7	29	Advance to Superfinal
4	Switzerland	12	3	3	6	52	58	–6	15	7	6	6	5	24	Advance to Superfinal
5	Italy	12	5	0	7	51	51	0	15	6	3	3	8	20	Advance to Superfinal
6	Spain	12	5	0	7	46	48	–2	15	1	5	7	6	19	Advance to Superfinal
7	Poland	12	3	2	7	52	51	+1	13	3	4	5	4	16	
8	Czech Republic	12	1	0	11	36	75	–39	3	4	1	1	1	7	

== Superfinal ==
The Superfinal took place at the Plages du Prado, Marseille, France.

The playoff event was organised as a multi-stage tournament; starting with a group stage, the six qualified nations were split into two groups of three, playing in a round robin format. The top two from each group advanced to the semi-finals from which point on the Superfinal was played as a knockout tournament until the winner of the 2007 EBSL was crowned, with an additional match to determine third place.

The semifinalists secured qualification to the 2007 FIFA Beach Soccer World Cup.

=== Group stage ===
Advance to the knockout stage

==== Group A ====
Pos	Team	Pld	W	W+	L	GF	GA	GD	Pts
1	Spain	2	1	1	0	14	10	+4	5
2	Russia	2	1	0	1	15	9	+6	3
3	Switzerland	2	0	0	2	5	15	−10	0

Results
21 August 2007	Russia	7–7 (a.e.t.); 0–1 (pens.)	Spain
22 August 2007	Spain	7–3	Switzerland
23 August 2007	Russia	8–2	Switzerland

==== Group B ====
Pos	Team	Pld	W	W+	L	GF	GA	GD	Pts
1	France	2	2	0	0	11	8	+3	6
2	Portugal	2	1	0	1	8	7	+1	3
3	Italy	2	0	0	2	7	11	−4	0

Results
21 August 2007	France	6–5	Italy
22 August 2007	Portugal	5–2	Italy
23 August 2007	France	5–3	Portugal

=== Knockout stage ===
Semi-finals
25 August 2007
Russia	3 (1)
France (p)	3 (2)
25 August 2007
Spain	5
Portugal	6

Final
26 August 2007
France	6
Portugal	7
Third place
26 August 2007
Russia	6
Spain	3

==== Championship match details ====
26 August 2007

France	6–7	Portugal
Basquaise; Samoun; Perez; Libbra; Edouard	Report	Madjer; Alan; Belchior; Loja; Marinho

Plages du Prado, Marseille
Attendance: 4,500

2007 Euro Beach Soccer League
champions

Portugal
Second title

Statistics
Top scorer(s): (Russia) Egor Shaykov (11 goals)

=== Superfinal final standings ===
Pos	Team	Notes	Qualification
1	Portugal	EBSL Champions	Qualified to 2007 FIFA Beach Soccer World Cup
2	France	Runners-up	Qualified to 2007 FIFA Beach Soccer World Cup
3	Russia	Third place	Qualified to 2007 FIFA Beach Soccer World Cup
4	Spain		Qualified to 2007 FIFA Beach Soccer World Cup
5	Italy		
6	Switzerland		

== Last chance bracket ==
European nations were granted five berths at the 2007 FIFA Beach Soccer World Cup. As Superfinal semifinalists, Portugal, Spain, Russia and France successfully claimed four of these spots. This meant one berth was yet to be filled. This berth was contested in a final round of the 2007 EBSL, independent from the normal proceedings of the league, known as the Last chance bracket. Played as a knockout tournament, parallel to the staging of the Superfinal, Italy won the event and claimed the final World Cup spot.

== Sources ==
- Roonba
- RSSSF
- beachsoccer.ru (in Russian)
