= Febelfin =

Belgian non-profit organization

Febelfin (from "Fédération belge du secteur financier") is a non-profit organisation whose goal is to provide credible and objective information about the Belgian financial sector. Febelfin collaborates with various public institutions at European, national and regional level, and wants to be a house of dialogue for all its stakeholders. Febelfin was created in 2005 and is located in Brussels.
