= 2005 FIFA Beach Soccer World Cup qualification (UEFA playoffs) =

Tournament details
- Host country: Brazil
- Dates: 6 – 7 May 2005
- Teams: 4 (from 1 confederation)
- Venue(s): 1 (in 1 host city)

Final positions
- Champions: Spain (1st title)
- Runners-up: Italy
- Third place: Switzerland
- Fourth place: Austria

Tournament statistics
- Matches played: 4
- Goals scored: 35 (8.75 per match)

The 2005 FIFA Beach Soccer World Cup qualification playoffs for (UEFA) was a special, one-off beach soccer tournament to determine the fourth European nation that would be competing in the 2005 FIFA Beach Soccer World Cup. The tournament started two days before the start of the world cup, ending the day before the opening match, from May 6 - May 7, 2005, in Rio de Janeiro, Brazil. The winners of the playoffs were Spain.

== Overview ==
Three nations had already confirmed their places in the world cup by finishing first, second and third in the 2004 Euro Beach Soccer League, being France, Portugal and Ukraine. The teams who finished in fourth, fifth, sixth and seventh were called back to compete for the final place at the world cup, however seventh place Belgium declined the invitation to participate, so eighth place Austria competed instead.

== Participating nations ==
- Italy (4th)
- Spain (5th)
- Switzerland (6th)
- ~~Belgium~~ (7th, declined invite)
- Austria (8th)

== Knockout stage ==
The nations played in a simple knockout format, starting with the semi-finals.

=== Semi-finals ===
6 May 2005

Italy	4 – 1	Austria

Copacabana Beach

6 May 2005

Spain	7 – 4	Switzerland

Copacabana Beach

=== Third place play off ===
7 May 2005

Switzerland	7 – 3	Austria

Copacabana Beach

=== Final ===
7 May 2005

Spain	7 – 2	Italy

Copacabana Beach

== Winners ==
Qualification playoff winners

Spain

== Final standings ==
Rank	Team
1	Spain
2	Italy
3	Switzerland
4	Austria

== Nations qualifying for the world cup ==
- France (1st, Euro Beach Soccer League)
- Portugal (2nd, Euro Beach Soccer League)
- Ukraine (3rd, Euro Beach Soccer League)
- Spain (Playoff winners)
