= David Wimleitner =

Austrian footballer

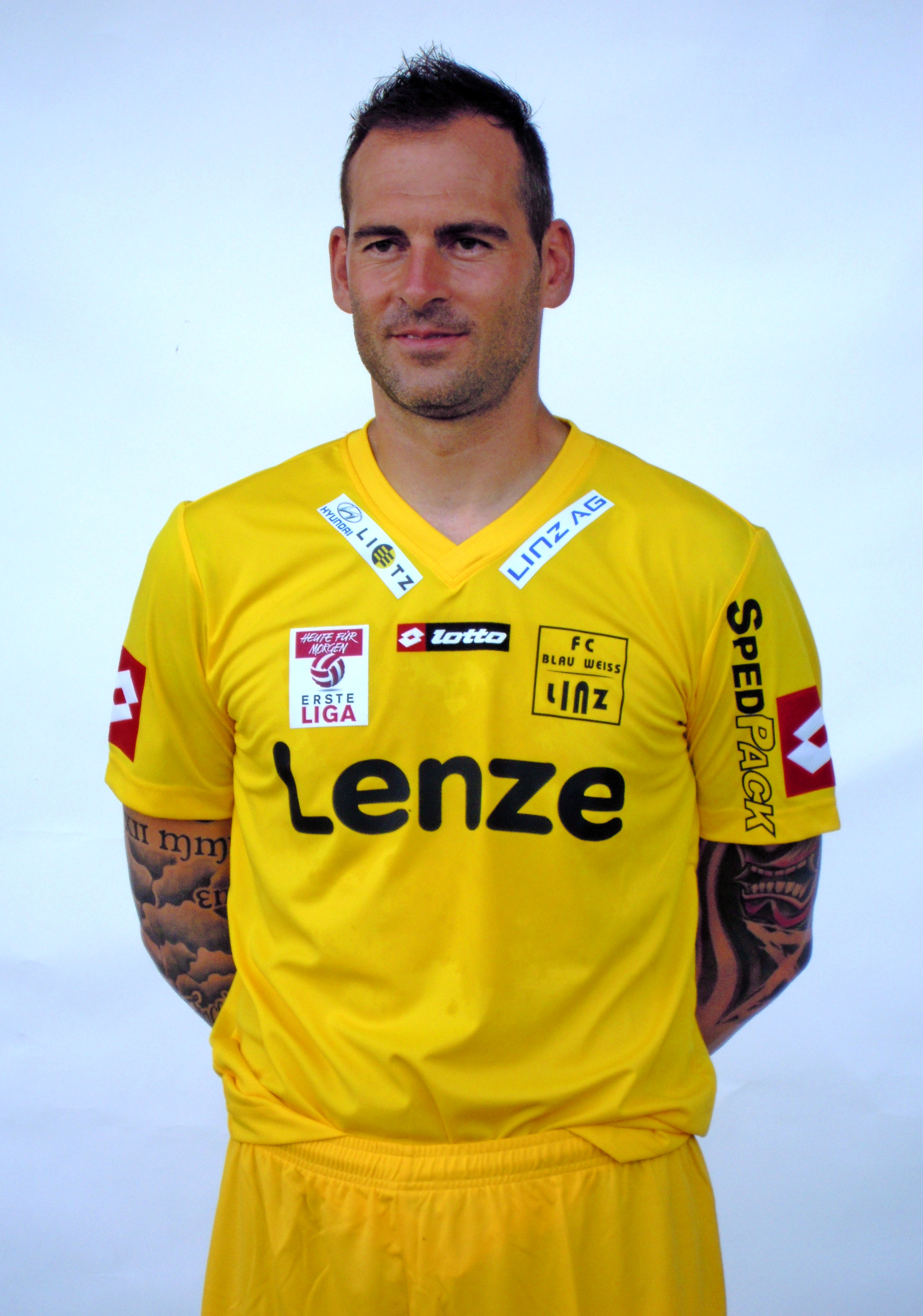
- David Wimleitner in 2012.

Personal information
- Date of birth: 21 January 1976 (age 50)
- Place of birth: Austria
- Height: 1.92 m (6 ft 4 in)
- Position: Goalkeeper

Youth career
- SV Grieskirchen

Senior career*
Years	Team	Apps	(Gls)
1997–1998	SV Grieskirchen		
1998–2003	LASK Linz	62	(0)
2003	SC Schwanenstadt 08		
2003–2004	SV Windischgarsten		
2004–2008	SV Grieskirchen		
2008–2013	FC Blau-Weiß Linz		

Managerial career
- 2016: FC Blau-Weiß Linz (caretaker)
- 2017: FC Blau-Weiß Linz (caretaker)
- * Club domestic league appearances and goals as of 2 March 2020

David Wimleitner (born 21 January 1976) is a former Austrian professional footballer who played as a goalkeeper. He has had two spells as caretaker manager of FC Blau-Weiß Linz.
