= Dario Teso =

Italian footballer (born 1985)

Personal information
- Date of birth: 27 December 1985 (age 40)
- Place of birth: Jesolo, Italy
- Height: 1.85 m (6 ft 1 in)
- Position: Centre-back

Team information
- Current team: Città di Caorle

Senior career*
Years	Team	Apps	(Gls)
2002–2006	Jesolo	82	(0)
2006–2008	Venezia	6	(0)
2007	→ Bassano Virtus (loan)	8	(0)
2008–2009	ISM Gradisca	30	(0)
2009–2010	Darfo Boario	22	(2)
2010–2013	Tritium	84	(6)
2013–2015	Carrarese	55	(2)
2015–2021	Renate	121	(4)
2020	→ Giana Erminio (loan)	5	(0)
2021	Lornano Badesse	3	(0)
2021	Union Feltre	8	(0)
2021–2022	Dolomiti Bellunesi	25	(0)
2022–	Città di Caorle		
- * Club domestic league appearances and goals as of 20:19, 12 February 2023 (UTC)

Dario Teso (born 27 December 1985) is an Italian football player who plays for Città di Caorle.

== Club career ==
Born in Jesolo, Veneto, Teso started his career in Jesolo, On 14 August 2006, after a trial period, he joined Venezia. However, in winter 2007, he joined Bassano on loan.

On 15 January 2020 he joined Giana Erminio on loan until the end of the season.

On 1 February 2021, his contract with Renate was terminated by mutual consent.

On 11 February 2021, he joined Serie D club Lornano Badesse.
