= Russia national beach soccer team results =

This article provides details of international beach soccer games played by the Russian national beach soccer team from past to present.

== Results ==
Key
Win
Draw
Defeat

=== 2016 ===
10 May 2016 2016 RFU Cup	Russia	4–4 (a.e.t.) (3–2 p)	Russia–2	Sochi, Russia
16:00	Krasheninnikov 3'; Makarov 10'; Shishin 36'; Zharikov 38'	Report(ru)	9' (pen.) Andreev; 24' (yellow card) 38' Shaykov; 28' Peremitin; 39' Ilyinsky	Stadium: Imeretinsky Stadium; Referee: Dmitry Kislovsky (Russia)
	Penalties
	Zharikov (penalty missed); Krasheninnikov (penalty scored); Shishin (penalty scored); Romanov (penalty scored)		(penalty scored) Gorchinsky; (penalty missed) Andreev; (penalty scored) Ilyinsky; (penalty missed) Pankratov

11 May 2016 2016 RFU Cup	Russia	4–3 (a.e.t.)	Poland	Sochi, Russia
17:35	Krasheninnikov 7'; Shishin 15'; Makarov 28', 38' (pen.) (yellow card) 32'	Report(ru)	7', 31', 33' Baran; (yellow card) 38' Piechnik	Stadium: Imeretinsky Stadium; Referee: Viktor Listratov (Russia)

12 May 2016 2016 RFU Cup	Russia	3–2	Hungary	Sochi, Russia
17:35	Zharikov 12' (yellow card) 33'; Shkarin 12'; Krasheninnikov 22'; Shishin 33'	Report(ru)	7' (yellow card) 20' Turos; (yellow card) 26' Szentes-Biro	Stadium: Imeretinsky Stadium; Referee: Roman Borisov (Russia)

24 June 2016 2016 EBSC	Russia	3–2	Ukraine	Belgrade, Serbia
18:25	Romanov 5'; Krasheninnikov 28', 34'	Report(ru)	7', 20' (yellow card) 37' Korniichuk; (yellow card) 10' Borsuk	Referee: Ingilab Mammadov (Azerbaijan)

25 June 2016 2016 EBSC	Russia	4–4 (a.e.t.) (0–2 p)	Portugal	Belgrade, Serbia
17:35	Makarov 1'; Shkarin 23'; Kryshanov 25' (pen.); Paporotniy 31'	Report(ru)	9' Belchior; 12', 23' Novo; (yellow card) 25' Torres; 27' Madjer	Referee: Thorsten Günther (Germany)
	Penalties
	Paporotniy (penalty missed); Leonov (penalty missed)		(penalty scored) Madjer; (penalty scored) Coimbra

26 June 2016 2016 EBSC	Russia	8–0	Hungary	Belgrade, Serbia
16:35	Kryshanov 13', 34'; Leonov 14'; Ilyinsky 16' (pen.); Shkarin (yellow card) 18'; Romanov 22'; Makarov 27', 30'; Paporotniy 35'	Report(ru)	(yellow card) 12' Turos; (yellow card) 16' Balas; (yellow card) 16' Besenyei	Referee: Ago Kartmann (Estonia)

1 July 2016 2016 EBSL, Division A	Poland	2–4	Russia	Moscow, Russia
19:15	Slowinski (yellow card) 12'; Ziober (yellow card) 12'; Krawczyk 14'; Baran 20' (yellow card) 28'	Report(ru)	9' Krasheninnikov; 12' Romanov; 19' Kryshanov; (yellow card) 29' Makarov; 35' (pen.) Gorchinskii	Stadium: Yantar Stadium; Referee: Alfredo Balconi (Italy)

2 July 2016 2016 EBSL, Division A	Russia	3–0	France	Moscow, Russia
19:15	Makarov 7'; Leonov 21'; Paporotnyi 32'	Report(ru)	(yellow card) 21' Marques	Stadium: Yantar Stadium; Referee: Eduards Borisevics (Latvia)

3 July 2016 2016 EBSL, Division A	Russia	7–7 (a.e.t.) (4–3 p)	Switzerland	Moscow, Russia
19:15	Paporotnyi 7'; Romanov 10', 11'; Shkarin 12'; Krasheninnikov 23', 33'; Makarov 30' (yellow card) 36'	Report(ru)	19', 28', 32', 33', 36' Stankovic; 23', 28' Spacca	Stadium: Yantar Stadium; Referee: Jude Amin Utulu (Malta)
	Penalties
	Gorchinskii (penalty scored); Krasheninnikov (penalty scored); Makarov (penalty scored); Romanov (penalty scored)		(penalty scored) Stankovic; (penalty scored) Spacca; (penalty scored) Misev; (penalty missed) Wittlin

12 August 2016 2016 EBSL, Division A	Russia	0–2	Belarus	Siófok, Hungary
14:45		Report(ru)	12' Samsonov; 34' Brishtel	Stadium: Siófok Arena; Referee: Ago Kartmann (Estonia)

13 August 2016 2016 EBSL, Division A	Russia	7–2	Romania	Siófok, Hungary
14:45	Shishin 5', 22'; Paporotnyi 13'; Krasheninnikov 15'; Pankratov 25' (pen.), 36'; Kryshanov 34'	Report(ru)	13', 30' Maciuca; (yellow card) 25' Ravoiu; (yellow card) 31' Tanase	Stadium: Siófok Arena; Referee: Csaba Baghy (Hungary)

14 August 2016 2016 EBSL, Division A	Portugal	3–4	Russia	Siófok, Hungary
17:15	Cavalcanti 12'; Coimbra (yellow card) 19'; Fonseka 24'; Belchior 26'; Novo (yellow card) 32'	Report(ru)	15' Kryshanov; 16' Krasheninnikov; 19', 32' Shishin	Stadium: Siófok Arena; Referee: Christian Zimmermann (Switzerland)

25 August 2016 2016 EBSL, Superfinal	Russia	5–3	Italy	Catania, Italy
17:55	Nikonorov 3'; Ilinskiy 12'; Makarov 16'; Paporotnyi 24'; Shkarin 35'	Report(ru)	9', 28' (pen.) Palmacci; 16' Frainetti	Stadium: DomusBet Arena Beach Stadium; Referee: Jude Amin Utulu (Malta)

26 August 2016 2016 EBSL, Superfinal	Russia	3–2 (a.e.t.)	Portugal	Catania, Italy
16:25	Romanov 5'; Nikonorov 33'; Makarov (yellow card) 33'; Shkarin 39' (pen.)	Report(ru)	5', 29' Coimbra	Stadium: DomusBet Arena Beach Stadium; Referee: Mikhail Prokharav (Belarus)

27 August 2016 2016 EBSL, Superfinal	Switzerland	3–3 (a.e.t.) (3–2 p)	Russia	Catania, Italy
15:15	Hodel 5'; Ott 29' (yellow card) 38'; Stankovic 31'	Report(ru)	5' (yellow card) 35' Romanov; 16' Ilinskyi; (red card) 28' Paporotnyi; 34' Shkarin	Stadium: DomusBet Arena Beach Stadium; Referee: Csaba Baghy (Hungary)
	Penalties
	Ott (penalty scored); Mo Jäggy (penalty scored); Stankovic (penalty scored)		(penalty scored) Aksenov; (penalty missed) Makarov; (penalty scored) Romanov

28 August 2016 2016 EBSL, Superfinal	Spain	7–8	Russia	Catania, Italy
16:50	Gomez 7', 24' (yellow card) 18'; Juanma 15'; Molina Suarez 17', 30'; Chiky 20'; Tracisto 22'	Report(ru)	9' Nikonorov; 9', 25' Peremitin; 12' Shkarin; 15' Makarov; 18' Shishin; 19', 28' Aksenov; (yellow card) 24' Ilinsky	Stadium: DomusBet Arena Beach Stadium; Referee: Ingilab Mammadov (Azerbaijan)

2 September 2016 2017 FIFA World Cup qualifiers	Kazakhstan	1–5	Russia	Jesolo, Italy
15:30	Orazov 27'	Report(ru)	18' (o.g.) Perevyortov; 20', 26', 33' Shishin; 23' Gorchinskiy	Referee: Alfredo Balconi (Italy)

4 September 2016 2017 FIFA World Cup qualifiers	Russia	4–2	Norway	Jesolo, Italy
15:25	Nikonorov 1', 11'; Paporotnyi 2'; Shishin 4'	Report(ru)	20' E. Salveson; 25' (yellow card) 25' H. Salveson	Referee: Lukasz Ostrowski (Poland)

5 September 2016 2017 FIFA World Cup qualifiers	Russia	7–3	Germany	Jesolo, Italy
17:45	Paporotnyi 2', 28'; Krasheninnikov 4'; Shkarin 6'; Makarov (red card) 21'; Romanov 29', 35'; Shishin (yellow card) 29' (goal) 36'	Report(ru)	15' Romrig; 24' Kniller; 30' Beqiri	Referee: Sergio Filipe Gomes Soares (Portugal)

7 September 2016 2017 FIFA World Cup qualifiers	Moldova	3–8	Russia	Jesolo, Italy
15:45	Eremia 7'; Iordachi 30'; Negara 36'	Report(ru)	6' (pen.), 9', 24' Paporotniy; (yellow card) 7' Ilynskiy; 14'Gorchinskiy; 15' Krasheninnikov; 17', 22' (pen.), 33' Nikonorov	Stadium: Stadio Picchi; Referee: Manolo Picchio (Italy)

8 September 2016 2017 FIFA World Cup qualifiers	Russia	3–5	Poland	Jesolo, Italy
15:35	Nikonorov 15' (yellow card) 32'; Krasheninnikov 20'; Paporotnyi 21'; Ilynskiy (yellow card) 31'	Report(ru)	5', 17' Saganowski; 9', 29' Gak; 36' Madani	Stadium: Stadio Picchi; Referee: Ago Kartmann (Estonia)

9 September 2016 2017 FIFA World Cup qualifiers	Russia	4–3 (a.e.t.)	Ukraine	Jesolo, Italy
15:20	Chuzhkov 23'; Paporotnyi 25'; Makarov 29', 37'	Report(ru)	5' Korniichuk; 18' (yellow card) 31' Zborovskyi; 36' (yellow card) 27' Shcherytsia	Stadium: Stadio Picchi; Referee: Gionni Matticoli

10 September 2016 2017 FIFA World Cup qualifiers	Russia	9–3	France	Jesolo, Italy
14:10	Makarov 1', 12'; Krasheninnikov 6', 18'; Gorchinskiy 13'; Shishin 20', 22'; Ilynskiy 29'; Nikonorov 32'	Report(ru)	1' Belhomme; 23' Fischer; 31' Basquaise; (yellow card) 35' Samoun	Stadium: Stadio Picchi

11 September 2016 2017 FIFA World Cup qualifiers	Russia	5–1	Czech Republic	Jesolo, Italy
15:15	Krasheninnikov 4'; Shkarin 10'; Makarov 18', 31'; Paporotnyi 21'	Report(ru)	14' Vyhnal	Stadium: Stadio Picchi; Referee: Jude Amin Utulu (Malta)

27 October 2016 2016 BSIC, friendly match	Russia	3–3 (4–5 p)	United Arab Emirates	Dubai, United Arab Emirates
15:15	Shishin 17'; Romanov 31'; Krasheninnikov 32'	Report(ru)	4' A. Beshr; 24' Hemadi; 32' Almuntaser	Stadium: Jumeirah Beach
	Penalties
	Ilynskiy (penalty scored); Paporotnyi (penalty scored); Shishin (penalty scored); Romanov (penalty scored); Nikonorov (penalty missed)		(penalty scored) A. M. Hussain; (penalty scored) Almuntaser; (penalty scored) W. Beshr; (penalty scored) K. Albalooshi; (penalty scored) A. Albalooshi

28 October 2016 2016 BSIC, friendly match	Russia	3–0	Hungary	Dubai, United Arab Emirates
15:45	Paporotnyi 10'; Shishin 30'; Nikonorov 34'	Report(ru)		Stadium: Jumeirah Beach

29 October 2016 2016 BSIC, friendly match	Russia	3–3 (3–2 p)	Japan	Dubai, United Arab Emirates
11:00	Romanov 5'; Krasheninnikov 11'; Shishin 24'	Report(ru)	1'; 12'; 23'	Stadium: Jumeirah Beach
	Penalties
	Leonov (penalty scored); Shishin (penalty scored); Krasheninnikov (penalty scored)		(penalty scored) Moreira; (penalty scored) Goto; (penalty missed) Oba

1 November 2016 2016 BSIC	Russia	10–6	Egypt	Dubai, United Arab Emirates
18:00	Nikonorov 2', 23', 27' (pen.); Krasheninnikov 3'; Shishin 12', 29'; Makarov 14', 18'; Leonov 25' (pen.); Peremitin 28'	Report(ru)	3' E. Elsayed; 12', 29' Hassan; 25' K. Elsayed; 27' Abdelsamie; 30' M. Ali	Stadium: Jumeirah Beach; Referee: Eduards Borisevics (Latvia)

2 November 2016 2016 BSIC	Russia	9–3	United States	Dubai, United Arab Emirates
20:00	Paportonyi 6', 27', 28'; Nikonorov 10', 24'; Makarov 14', 19', 21'; Peremitin 16'	Report(ru)	4', 35' T. Canale; 12' Perera	Stadium: Jumeirah Beach; Referee: Ahmad Salasmy (United Arab Emirates)

3 November 2016 2016 BSIC	Iran	3–3 (a.e.t.) (3–1 p)	Russia	Dubai, United Arab Emirates
20:00	Mesigar 2' (yellow card) 28'; Boulokbashi 4'; Kiani 19'	Report(ru)	2', 19' Peremitin; 36' Makarov; (yellow card) 38' Shishin	Stadium: Jumeirah Beach; Referee: Suhaimi Mat Hassan (Malaysia)
	Penalties
	Nazem (penalty scored); Mokhtari (penalty scored); Akhmadzadeh (penalty scored)		(penalty missed) Paporotnyi; (penalty scored) Shishin

4 November 2016 2016 BSIC	Brazil	7–0	Russia	Dubai, United Arab Emirates
18:45	Bokinha 7', 31' da Costa (yellow card) 18' (goal) 22'; Mauricinho 24', 30' (pen.); Bruno Xavier 26'; Lima 34'	Report(ru)	(yellow card) 7' Paporotnyi; (yellow card) 30' Shishin	Stadium: Jumeirah Beach; Referee: Turki Al Salehi (Oman)

5 November 2016 2016 BSIC	Russia	4–3	Tahiti	Dubai, United Arab Emirates
18:50	Nikonorov 7'; Leonov 11'; Krasheninnikov 25'; Paporotnyi 27'	Report(ru)	3' Bennett; (yellow card) 19' (yellow card) 31' (red card) Tze-Yu; 29' Torohia; 34' (o.g.) Paporotnyi	Stadium: Jumeirah Beach; Referee: Laurynas Arzuolaitis (Lithuania)

=== 2017 ===
23 June 2017 2017 EBSL, Division A	France	4–2	Russia	Belgrade, Serbia
16:55	Basquese 5', 22'; Barbotti 20' (pen.), 36'	Report(ru)	8', 12' Nikonorov	Referee: Gionni Matticoli (Italy)

24 June 2017 2017 EBSL, Division A	Russia	3–2	Germany	Belgrade, Serbia
16:55	Makarov 17'; Nikonorov 19'; Krasheninnikov 25'	Report(ru)	28' (pen.) Göttlich; 33' Bekiri	Referee: Oleg Cebotari (Moldova)

25 June 2017 2017 EBSL, Division A	Russia	1–3	Spain	Belgrade, Serbia
16:55	Krasheninnikov 32'	Report(ru)	1' Llorenc; 13' Mayor; 27' Chiky	Referee: Gionni Matticoli (Italy)

21 July 2017 2017 BSWW Mundialito	Brazil	9–4	Russia	Cascais, Portugal
14:30	Catarino 9'; Mauricinho 10', 13', 24' (pen.); Fernando Ddi 25'; Rodrigo 28'; Datinha 30'; Bruno Xavier 32'; Filipe 36'	Report(ru)	12' Zharikov; 18' (o.g.) Filipe; 28' Romanov; 34' Paporotnyi	Stadium: Praia de Carcavelos; Referee: Francisco Henriques Costa (Portugal)

22 July 2017 2017 BSWW Mundialito	Portugal	3–1	Russia	Cascais, Portugal
16:00	Madjer 25'; Bê Martins 29'; Léo Martins 31'	Report(ru)	7' Kryshanov	Stadium: Praia de Carcavelos; Referee: Daniel Yuste Querol (Spain)

22 July 2017 2017 BSWW Mundialito	Russia	5–2	France	Cascais, Portugal
16:00	Kryshanov 4', 36'; Paporotnyi 13', 18'; Shkarin 32'	Report(ru)	7' Suarez; 34' (pen.) Barbotti	Stadium: Praia de Carcavelos; Referee: Francisco Henriques Costa (Portugal)

28 July 2017 2017 EBSL, Division A	Greece	0–9	Russia	Moscow, Russia
17:45		Report(ru)	3', 9' Nikonorov; 12', 17' Makarov; 14' Shkarin; 19' Krasheninnikov; 21' Kryshanov; 25', 34' Paporotnyi	Stadium: Yantar Stadium; Referee: Lukasz Ostrowski (Poland)

29 July 2017 2017 EBSL, Division A	Russia	3–2	Belarus	Moscow, Russia
17:30	Krasheninnikov 9'; Shkarin 12', 32'	Report(ru)	21' Bryshtel; 30' Savich	Stadium: Yantar Stadium; Referee: Alfredo Pavone (Italy)

30 July 2017 2017 EBSL, Division A	Russia	7–4	Switzerland	Moscow, Russia
17:30	Shkarin 7'; Makarov 10', 11', 24'; Shishin (yellow card) 18' (yellow card) 36' (red card); Kryshanov 22'; Krasheninnikov 35'	Report(ru)	(yellow card) 11' Allenbach; 11', 12', 17' Stankovic; 24' Mo Jäggy	Stadium: Yantar Stadium; Referee: Eduards Borisevics (Latvia)

14 September 2017 2017 EBSL, Superfinal	Belarus	1–4	Russia	Terracina, Italy
14:50	Brishtel 3'	Report(ru)	V. Kryshanov 4', 12'; Nikonorov 20'; Chuzhkov 27'	Stadium: Beach Arena "Carlo Guarnieri"; Referee: Eduards Borisevics (Latvia)

15 September 2017 2017 EBSL, Superfinal	Ukraine	3–4	Russia	Terracina, Italy
15:00	Shcheritsa (yellow card) 9'; Gladchenko 26'; Pachev 30'; Voitok 35'; Glutsky (yellow card) 36'	Report(ru)	(yellow card) 10' V. Kryshanov; 21', 34' Nikonorov; Paporotnyi 36', 36'	Stadium: Beach Arena "Carlo Guarnieri"; Referee: Laurynas Arzuolaitis (Lithuania)

16 September 2017 2017 EBSL, Superfinal	Russia	4–2	Italy	Terracina, Italy
17:15	N. Kryshanov 8'; Pavlenko 10'; Romanov 21', 36'	Report(ru)	14' Palmacci; 29' Zurlo	Stadium: Beach Arena "Carlo Guarnieri"; Referee: Eduards Borisevics (Latvia)

17 September 2017 2017 EBSL, Superfinal	Portugal	1–3	Russia	Terracina, Italy
17:25	Torres (yellow card) 31'; Santos 36'	Report(ru)	9' Krasheninnikov; 12', 22' (yellow card) 29' Paporotnyi; (yellow card) 36' Pavlenko	Stadium: Beach Arena "Carlo Guarnieri"; Referee: Laurynas Arzuolaitis (Lithuania)

31 October 2017 2017 BSIC	Russia	6–2	Mexico	Dubai, United Arab Emirates
18:45	N. Kryshanov 6'; Krasheninnikov 8'; Pavlenko 11'; Nikonorov 17', 36' (yellow card) 17'; Romanov 18'	Report(ru)	27' Maldonado; 29' Piñeda	Stadium: Marasi Business Bay; Referee: Ebrahim Almansory (United Arab Emirates)

1 November 2017 2017 BSIC	Paraguay	1–2	Russia	Dubai, United Arab Emirates
18:45	Barreto 34'	Report(ru)	24' Nikonorov; 35' Paporotnyi	Stadium: Marasi Business Bay; Referee: Ahmad Salasmy (United Arab Emirates)

2 November 2017 2017 BSIC	Iran	3–4 (a.e.t.)	Russia	Dubai, United Arab Emirates
20:00	Hosseini 11'; Hazem 15'; Mesigar (yellow card) 15'; Ahmadzade 31'	Report(ru)	1', 2', 4' Makarov; (yellow card) 14' N. Kryshanov; 37' (o.g.) Abdollahi	Stadium: Marasi Business Bay; Referee: Gionni Matticoli (Italy)

3 November 2017 2017 BSIC	Russia	2–3	Portugal	Dubai, United Arab Emirates
18:45	Chuzhkov 12'; Paporotnyi 16'; Makarov (yellow card) 27'	Report(ru)	9' Novo; 27' Andrade; 35' (pen.) Santos	Stadium: Marasi Business Bay

4 November 2017 2017 BSIC	Russia	2–4	Iran	Dubai, United Arab Emirates
17:45	Chuzhkov (yellow card) 1' (yellow card) 36' (red card); Nikonorov 17'; Romanov 29'	Report(ru)	20' Behzadpur; 22' (yellow card) 34' Ahmadzade; (yellow card) 26' (goal) 36' Kiani; (yellow card) 28' Akbari; 28' (yellow card) 28' Moradi; (yellow card) 34' Mesigar	Stadium: Marasi Business Bay

=== 2018 ===
20 July 2018 2018 EBSL, Division A	Azerbaijan	3–8	Russia	Moscow, Russia
18:45	Allahguliyev 13'; Zeynalov 19'; Bakshaliev (yellow card) 30'; Nazarov 32'	Report(ru)	2' Paporotnyi; 3', 13' Makarov; 9', 30' Romanov; 11' Federov; 20', 35' Shishin	Stadium: Yantar Beach Soccer Stadium; Referee: Ago Kaertmann (Estonia)

21 July 2018 2018 EBSL, Division A	Russia	6–3	Poland	Moscow, Russia
18:30	Makarov (yellow card) 9', (goal) 31'; Romanov 11'; Krasheninnikov 11' (yellow card) 32'; Shishin 31', 35'; Paporotnyi 34'	Report(ru)	32' (pen.) Pozniak; 34' Friszkemut; 34' Marciniak	Stadium: Yantar Beach Soccer Stadium; Referee: Ago Kaertmann (Estonia)

22 July 2018 2018 EBSL, Division A	Russia	3–2 (a.e.t.)	Switzerland	Moscow, Russia
18:45	Shishin 11'; Paporotnyi 20'; Krasheninnikov 37'; Shkarin (yellow card) 39'	Report(ru)	3' Ott; 21' Hodl; (yellow card) 38' Bohrer	Stadium: Yantar Beach Soccer Stadium; Referee: Gionni Matticoli (Italy)

24 August 2018 2018 EBSL, Division A	Russia	2–6	Spain	Warnemünde, Germany
16:15	Novikov 3'; Shkarin 18'; Fedorov (yellow card) 35'	Report(ru)	13', 35' Chiky; 16' Llorenç; 21' Suarez; 31' Guisado; 33' Torres	Stadium: Sport & Beach Arena; Referee: Christian Zimmermann (Switzerland)

25 August 2018 2018 EBSL, Division A	Russia	6–1	France	Warnemünde, Germany
16:40	Krasheninnikov 9', 22', 30'; Zemskov 21', 26', 32'	Report(ru)	(yellow card) 4' Basquaise; 13' Angeletti; (yellow card) 14' Gosselin	Stadium: Sport & Beach Arena; Referee: Andrei Karhu (Romania)

26 August 2018 2018 EBSL, Division A	Germany	0–4	Russia	Warnemünde, Germany
16:30		Report(ru)	1', 30' Zemskov; 4' Shishin; 12' Paporotnyi	Stadium: Sport & Beach Arena; Referee: Christian Zimmermann (Switzerland)

6 September 2018 2018 EBSL, Superfinal	Russia	6–0	Ukraine	Sardinia, Italy
15:25	4' Makarov; 4', 10', 29' Zemskov; 28' Krasheninnikov; 36' Paporotnyi	Report(ru)	(yellow card) 30' Makeev	Stadium: Spiaggia del Lido di Alghero; Referee: Laurynas Arzuolaitis (Lithuania)

7 September 2018 2018 EBSL, Superfinal	Italy	6–5 (a.e.t.)	Russia	Sardinia, Italy
18:25	Ramacciotti 10', 24'; Gori 13', 28'; Chiavaro (yellow card) 24'; Zurlo 30'; Marinai 38'	Report(ru)	9' Shishin; 15' Zemskov; 19' Novikov; 22' Krasheninnikov; (yellow card) 24' Makarov; 25' Paporotnyi	Stadium: Spiaggia del Lido di Alghero; Referee: Jude Amin Utulu (Malta)

8 September 2018 2018 EBSL, Superfinal	Russia	2–1	Belarus	Sardinia, Italy
15:35	Romanov 8'; Shkarin (yellow card) 15'; Krasheninnikov 27'	Report(ru)	15' Bryshtel	Stadium: Spiaggia del Lido di Alghero; Referee: Eduards Borisevics (Latvia)

9 September 2018 2018 EBSL, Superfinal	Portugal	4–4 (a.e.t.) (3–2 p)	Russia	Sardinia, Italy
17:00	Andrade (red card) 7'; Jordan (yellow card) 9' (goal) 36'; Torres (yellow card) 28'; Belchior 31', 36', 39'	Report(ru)	9' Nikonorov; 18' Zemskov; 36' Shishin; (yellow card) 36' Romanov; 38' Zemskov	Stadium: Spiaggia del Lido di Alghero; Referee: Vladimir Tashkov (Bulgaria)
	Penalties
	Madjer (penalty scored); Coimbra (penalty scored); Jordan (penalty scored)		(penalty scored) Romanov; (penalty missed) Paporotnyi; (penalty scored) Shishin

6 November 2018 2018 BSIC, Group Stage	Tahiti	6–7	Russia	Dubai, United Arab Emirates
18:45	Taiarui 8'; Tavanae 24', 25'; Revel 26'; Labaste 30'; Li Fung Kuee 34'	Report(ru)	1' Chuzhkov; 8', 19' Zemskov; 8', 14' Paporotnyi; 10' Nikonorov; 34' Shkarin	Stadium: Kite Beach; Referee: Sergio Gomes Soares (Portuguese)

7 November 2018 2018 BSIC, Group Stage	Russia	13–3	United States	Dubai, United Arab Emirates
18:45	Zemskov 1', 19', 24', 29', 32', 36'; Novikov 5' (yellow card) 35'; Paporotnyi 6'; Shkarin (yellow card) 13'; Krasheninnikov 17', 35'; Shishin 20'; Romanov 21', 34'	Report(ru)	2' (yellow card) 18' Mondragon; 11' (33) Albiston	Stadium: Kite Beach; Referee: Ibrahim Alraeesi (United Arab Emirates)

8 November 2018 2018 BSIC, Group Stage	Iran	3–2	Russia	Dubai, United Arab Emirates
20:00	Akbari 11'; Piramoun 12' (yellow card) 23'; Behzadpour 32'	Report(ru)	(yellow card) 23' Novikov; 28' Romanov; (yellow card) 1' (goal) 29' Zemskov	Stadium: Kite Beach; Referee: Christian Zimmermann (Switzerland)

9 November 2018 2018 BSIC, Semifinal	Russia	5–5 (a.e.t.) (3–1 p)	Brazil	Dubai, United Arab Emirates
20:00	Makarov 7'; Nikonorov 13', 39' (yellow card) 31'; Paporotnyi 19', 25'; Shishin (yellow card) 30'	Report(ru)	25', 31' (yellow card) 24' (yellow-red card) 32' Bruno Xavier; 35' Datinha; 36', 37' Rodrigo	Stadium: Kite Beach; Referee: Suhaimi Mat Hassan (Malaysia)
	Penalties
	Krasheninnikov (penalty scored); Shishin (penalty scored); Makarov (penalty scored)		(penalty scored) Igor; (penalty missed) Filipe

10 November 2018 2018 BSIC, Final	Iran	4–2	Russia	Dubai, United Arab Emirates
20:00	Kiani 4'; Masoumizadeh 7', 24'; Behzadpour 11'; Mahdi (yellow card) 18'; Akbari (yellow card) 33'	Report(ru)	13', 31' Paporotnyi; (yellow card) 20' Nikonorov	Stadium: Kite Beach; Referee: Bakhtiyor Namazov (Uzbekistan)

=== 2019 ===
9 May 2019 2019 WBG, Qualifier	Russia	7–0	Norway	Salou, Spain
15:25	Paporotnyi 2', 12'; Zemskov 16'; Krasheninnikov 17'; Novikov 18'; Bazhenov 19', 24'	Report(ru)

10 May 2019 2019 WBG, Qualifier	Russia	7–2	Ukraine	Salou, Spain
16:15	Shishin 2', 6', 17', 21'; Paporotnyi (yellow card) 9' (goal) 31'; Romanov 14'; Krasheninnikov 17'	Report(ru)	22' Nerush; 24' Voitok; (yellow card) 26' Medvid

11 May 2019 2019 WBG, Qualifier	Switzerland	3–4	Russia	Salou, Spain
11:00	Bohrer 4'; Hodel 15' 31'; Büst 30' (pen.)	Report(ru)	8', 12', 27' Zemskov; 13' Paporotnyi; (yellow card) 30' Chuzhkov

12 May 2019 2019 WBG, Qualifier	Russia	5–4	Spain	Salou, Spain
18:30	Shkarin 8'; Makarov (yellow card) 15' (goal) 19' (pen.), 32' (pen.); Krasheninnikov (yellow card) 16' (yellow-red card) 21'; Shishin 16' 31'; Bazhenov (yellow card) 18'; Paporotnyi 19'; Novikov (yellow card) 30'; V. Kryshanov (yellow card) 36'	Report(ru)	9', 15' (yellow card) 32' Medina; 15', 23' Llorenç; (yellow card) 18' Ardil Navarro; (red card) 19' Domingo

25 June 2019 2019 EG, Group stage	Spain	5–4 (a.e.t.)	Russia	Minsk, Belarus
14:30	Major (red card) 8'; Suarez 13', 22', 35'; Llorenç 29'; Cintas 30'; Medina (yellow card) 31'; Adrian (yellow card) 35'	Report 1 Report 2	14', 25', 30' Shishin; (yellow card) 31' N. Kryshanov; 32' Zemskov	Stadium: Olympic Sports Complex; Referee: Sofien Benchabane (France)

26 June 2019 2019 EG, Group stage	Italy	4–2	Russia	Minsk, Belarus
14:30	Corosiniti 7'; Gori (yellow card) 15' (goal) 20', 34'; Carpita 29' di Palma (yellow card) 36'	Report 1 Report 2	14' (o.g.) del Mestre; 16' (red card) 32' Krasheninnikov; (yellow card) 30' Shkarin; (yellow card) 32' Paporotnyi	Stadium: Olympic Sports Complex; Referee: Sergio Felipe Gomes Soares (Portugal)

26 June 2019 2019 EG, Group stage	Russia	5–1	Ukraine	Minsk, Belarus
14:30	V. Kryshanov 15' (pen.) (yellow card) 35'; Paporotnyi 17'; Zemskov 25'; Shishin 34'; Romanov 34'	Report 1 Report 2	(yellow card) 13' Zavorotnyi; 27' Sydorenko	Stadium: Olympic Sports Complex; Referee: Ago Kärtmann (Estonia)

28 June 2019 2019 EG, Classification	Belarus	5–5 (a.e.t.) (2–3 p)	Russia	Minsk, Belarus
15:30	Ryabko 1'; Kanstantsinau 2'; Piatrouski 11'; Hapon 30'; Savich 32'	Report 1 Report 2	N. Kryshanov 11'; Paporotnyi 15', 15' (pen.), 18'; Zemskov 34'	Stadium: Olympic Sports Complex; Referee: Vitalij Gomolko (Lithuania)
	Penalties
	Savich (penalty scored); Bokach (penalty missed); Chaikouski (penalty scored)		(penalty scored) Krasheninnikov; (penalty scored) Paporotnyi; (penalty scored) Shishin

29 June 2019 2019 EG, Classification	Italy	4–3	Russia	Minsk, Belarus
14:30	Palmacci 17'; Gori 25', 34'; Corosiniti 30'	Report 1 Report 2	Zemskov 13'; N. Kryshanov 21'; Paporotnyi 25'	Stadium: Olympic Sports Complex; Referee: Vitalij Gomolko (Lithuania)

5 July 2019 2019 EBSL, Division A	Russia	3–3 (a.e.t.) (3–2 p)	Azerbaijan	Nazaré, Portugal
14:30	Fedorov 11'; Nikonorov 29'; Stepliani 36'	Report	3' Allahguliyev; 21' Manafov; 31' Nazarov	Referee: Antonio Pereira (Portugal)
	Penalties
	Krasheninnikov (penalty scored); Paporotnyi (penalty scored); Nikonorov (penalty scored)		(penalty scored) Zeynalov; (penalty scored) Allahguliyev; (penalty missed) Mammadov

6 July 2019 2019 EBSL, Division A	Turkey	2–5	Russia	Nazaré, Portugal
15:35	Yeşilırmak 6'; Bağcı (yellow card) 10'; Keskin 18'	Report	10' (pen.) Raskin; 10' Fedorov; 17' Zharikov; 21', 33' Nikonorov; (yellow card) 21' Novikov	Referee: Attila Balint (Romanian)

7 July 2019 2019 EBSL, Division A	Russia	1–2	Spain	Nazaré, Portugal
18:00	Nikonorov 15'	Report	4' Antonio Mayor; 22' Donna	Referee: Sergio Felipe Gomes Soares (Portugal)

19 July 2019 2019 FIFA BSWC, Qualifier	Russia	6–2	Germany	Moscow, Russia
19:30	Chuzhkov 2'; Nikonorov 4', 15' (pen.), 31'; Romanov 22'; Paporotnyi 25'	Report	11' Biermann; 34' Svenson	Stadium: Luzhniki Olympic Complex

20 July 2019 2019 FIFA BSWC, Qualifier	Estonia	2–7	Russia	Moscow, Russia
19:00	Lepik 34'; Munskind 34'	Report	2' N. Kryshanov; 2', 15' Zemskov; 5' Makarov; 6' Krasheninnikov; 7' Paporotnyi; 34' Shishin	Stadium: Luzhniki Olympic Complex; Referee: Matticoli Gionni (Italy)

21 July 2019 2019 FIFA BSWC, Qualifier	Russia	5–1	Hungary	Moscow, Russia
15:45	Romanov 2', 7'; Chuzhkov 14'; Nikonorov 21'; Shishin 31'	Report	22' Genczler; (red card) 27' Rutai	Stadium: Luzhniki Olympic Complex; Referee: Özcan Sultanoğlu (Turkey)

23 July 2019 2019 FIFA BSWC, Qualifier	Russia	8–0	Moldova	Moscow, Russia
20:00	Paporotnyi 2'; Makarov 3'; Shishin 12'; Nikonorov 21', 28'; Zemskov 24', 26', 36'	Report	(yellow card) 19' Șchiopu	Stadium: Luzhniki Olympic Complex; Referee: Laurynas Aržuolaitis (Lithuania)

24 July 2019 2019 FIFA BSWC, Qualifier	Switzerland	3–9	Russia	Moscow, Russia
20:00	Stankovic 14'; Ott (yellow card) 21'; Steinemann 27'; Jaeggy 33'	Report	3', 14', 26' Makarov; 4' Krasheninnikov; 13', 26' Romanov; 16', 22' Paporotnyi; 20' Shishin	Stadium: Luzhniki Olympic Complex; Referee: Gionni Matticoli (Italy)

25 July 2019 2019 FIFA BSWC, Qualifier	Russia	6–0	Azerbaijan	Moscow, Russia
18:45	Chuzhkov 3'; Romanov 5'; Shishin 6', 23'; N. Kryshanov 32' (pen.); Nikonorov 34'	Report		Stadium: Luzhniki Olympic Complex; Referee: Sofien Benchabane (France)

26 July 2019 2019 FIFA BSWC, Qualifier	Russia	6–1	Spain	Moscow, Russia
20:00	Chuzhkov 1'; Javi T. 8' (o.g.); Nikonorov 21'; V. Kryshanov 24'; Paporotnyi 24'; Krasheninnikov 28'	Report	29' (o.g.) Shkarin	Stadium: Luzhniki Olympic Complex; Referee: Ago Kärtmann (Estonia)

27 July 2019 2019 FIFA BSWC, Qualifier	Italy	1–7	Russia	Moscow, Russia
18:30	Gori 22'; Ramacciotti (yellow card) 31'	Report	1' Krasheninnikov; 8' (o.g.) Ramacciotti; 12' Shkarin; 14' Chuzhkov; 18', 27' Zemskov; 21' Paporotnyi	Stadium: Luzhniki Olympic Complex; Referee: Raul Martin Gonzalez Frances (Spain)

5 September 2019 2019 EBSL, Superfinal	Belarus	4–4 (a.e.t.) (2–1 p)	Russia	Figueira da Foz, Portugal
14:15	Makarevich 1'; Piatrouski 5'; Samsonov 15'; Miranovich (yellow card) 26'; Savich 33'; Kanstantsinau (yellow card) 35'	Report(ru)	4', 26' (pen.) Makarov; (yellow card) 17' Novikov; 24' Paporotnyi; 27' Zemskov; (yellow card) 33' Nikonorov	Stadium: Beach Sports Complex; Referee: Sergio Gomes Soares (Portugal)
	Penalties
	Savich (penalty scored); Samsonov (penalty missed); Chaikouski (penalty scored)		(penalty scored) Shishin; (penalty missed) Paporotnyi; (penalty missed) Krasheninnikov

6 September 2019 2019 EBSL, Superfinal	Spain	6–7	Russia	Figueira da Foz, Portugal
16:55	Eduard 3'; Chiki 7', 14', 20' (pen.); Llorenç 11'; Adrian 17'	Report(ru)	4', 32' Paporotnyi; 10' Shishin; (yellow card) 20' Bazhenov; 21' Fedorov; (yellow card) 12' (goal) 25', 27', 31' Zemskov	Stadium: Beach Sports Complex; Referee: Eduards Borisevics (Latvia)

7 September 2019 2019 EBSL, Superfinal	Russia	5–1	Switzerland	Figueira da Foz, Portugal
14:15	Fedorov 3', 35'; Nikonorov 17', 22', 27'	Report(ru)	5' Schirinzi	Stadium: Beach Sports Complex; Referee: Sergio Gomes Soares (Portugal)

11 October 2019 2019 AWBG	El Salvador	2–4	Russia	Doha, Qatar
21:00	Batres 5'; Henríquez 18'	Report(ru)	2' Paporotnyi; 12', 25' Makarov; 27' Nikonorov	Stadium: Katara Beach; Referee: Shao Liang (China)

12 October 2019 2019 AWBG	Russia	5–3	Uruguay	Doha, Qatar
19:30	Makarov (yellow card) 1' (goal) 5'; Shishin 5'; Paporotnyi 8', 12', 15'	Report(ru)	5' Fernandez; 14' Acuña; 32' Costa	Stadium: Katara Beach

14 October 2019 2019 AWBG	Russia	6–5 (a.e.t.)	Japan	Doha, Qatar
22:30	Zemskov 6'; Krasheninnikov 7'; Zemskov (yellow card) 13'; Paporotnyi 14', 39'; Bazhenov 16'; Makarov 22'	Report(ru)	1' Ginoza; 4' Yamauchi; 12', 19' (pen.) Okuyama; 34' Matsuo	Stadium: Katara Beach

15 October 2019 2019 AWBG, Semifinal	Iran	2–6	Russia	Doha, Qatar
17:30	Masoumizadeh 21'; Mokhtari 23' (yellow card) 30'	Report(ru)	5' Makarov; 8', 32' Zemskov; 12' Shishin; (yellow card) 30' (goal) 34' Novikov; 35' Nikonorov	Stadium: Katara Beach

16 October 2019 2019 AWBG, Final	Russia	3–9	Brazil	Doha, Qatar
20:30	Paporotnyi 19'; Zemskov 20'; Makarov 36' (pen.)	Report(ru)	8' Catarino; 8' Rodrigo; 17', 18', 19' Mauricinho; 24' Bokinha; 32' Filipe Silva; 36', 36' Lucão	Stadium: Katara Beach

5 November 2019 2019 BSIC, Group stage	Egypt	3–5	Russia	Dubai, UAE
18:45	Moustafa 5'; Mohamed 8', 30'	Report	7', 12' Raskin; 9' Novikov; 14' Pavlenko; 15' (pen.) Kryshanov	Referee: Ibrahim Al Raeesi (United Arab Emirates)

6 November 2019 2019 BSIC, Group stage	Russia	3–1	Mexico	Dubai, UAE
18:45	Zharikov 8'; Nikonorov 19'; V. Kryshanov 30'	Report	20' N. Martinez	Referee: Turki Al Salehi (Oman)

7 November 2019 2019 BSIC, Group stage	Russia	3–3 (a.e.t.) (4–5 p)	Iran	Dubai, UAE
20:00	Chuzhkov 2'; Raskin 20'; Nikonorov 35'	Report	22' Akbari; 24' Mirshekari; 30' (o.g.) V. Kryshanov	Referee: Antonio Pereira (Portugal)
	Penalties
	V. Kryshanov (penalty scored); Nikonorov (penalty scored); Novikov (penalty scored); Fedorov (penalty scored); Zharikov (penalty missed)		(penalty scored) Masoumizadeh; (penalty scored) Mokhtari; (penalty scored) Kiani; (penalty scored) Mirshekari; (penalty scored) Shirmohammadi

8 November 2019 2019 BSIC, Semifinals	Spain	4–2	Russia	Dubai, UAE
18:45	Llorenç 10'; Adril 18'; Chiky 28'; Javi Torres 29'	Report	19' Nikonorov; 27' Fedorov	Referee: Turki Al Salehi (Oman)

9 November 2019 2019 BSIC, Third place play-off	Russia	1–2 (a.e.t.)	United Arab Emirates	Dubai, UAE
18:45	Nikonorov 36'	Report(ru)	6', 38' W. Beshr	Referee: Yuichi Hatano (Japan)

22 November 2019 2019 FIFA World Cup, Group stage	Senegal	7–8	Russia	Luque, Paraguay
16:15	Diassy 5', 17', 29', 34' (pen.); Fall 15', 33'; Mendy 26'	Report	Thioune 1' (o.g.); Nikonorov 4', 34'; Zemskov 8', 31', 32'; Paporotnyi 23', 34'	Stadium: Los Pynandi Stadium; Attendance: 277; Referee: Gustavo Domínguez (Paraguay)

24 November 2019 2019 FIFA World Cup, Group stage	Russia	1–4	United Arab Emirates	Luque, Paraguay
16:15	Paporotnyi 19'	Report	Al-Jasmi 2'; A. Mohammad 23'; Muntaser 32' (pen.); W. Beshr 33'	Stadium: Los Pynandi Stadium; Attendance: 368; Referee: Mariano Romo (Argentina)

26 November 2019 2019 FIFA World Cup, Group stage	Russia	5–3	Belarus	Luque, Paraguay
19:25	Nikonorov 6', 16', 34'; Zemskov 14'; Shishin 36'	Report	Hapon 5'; Bryshtsel 7'; Kanstantsinau 10'	Stadium: Los Pynandi Stadium; Attendance: 1,163; Referee: Gionni Matticoli (Italy)

28 November 2019 2019 FIFA World Cup, Quarterfinals	Brazil	3–4	Russia	Luque, Paraguay
16:15	Rodrigo 1', 13'; Mão 5'	Report	Zemskov 2'; Shishin 20'; Romanov 24', 31'	Stadium: Los Pynandi Stadium; Attendance: 1,401; Referee: Said Hachim (Madagascar)

30 November 2019 2019 FIFA World Cup, Semifinals	Italy	8–7 (a.e.t.)	Russia	Luque, Paraguay
16:15	Corosiniti 9'; Ramacciotti 10', 15', 27'; Gori 25', 25', 31'; Zurlo 37' (pen.)	Report	Novikov 4'; Makarov 14', 35'; Zemskov 22', 24'; Romanov 25', 31'	Stadium: Los Pynandi Stadium; Attendance: 579; Referee: Ebrahim Al-Mansory (United Arab Emirates)

1 December 2019 2019 FIFA World Cup, Third place match	Russia	5–4	Japan	Luque, Paraguay
16:15	Zemskov 8', 23', 29'; Novikov 8'; Makarov 26'	Report	Akaguma 4', 8'; Ozu 12'; Oba 23'	Stadium: Los Pynandi Stadium; Attendance: 2,739; Referee: Juan Angeles (Dominican Republic)
