= AC Jesolo =

Italian football club

- Full name: Associazione Calcio Jesolo
- Founded: 1929 (as Gruppo Sportivo Dopolavoro Jesolo); 1997 (refounded)
- Ground: Stadio Antiche Mura, Jesolo, Italy
- Capacity: 4000
- Chairman: Emilio Sorgon
- Manager: Lorenzo Piccolo
- League: Prima Categoria Veneto/G
- 2010–11: Prima Categoria Veneto/G 11th
Home colours	Away colours

Associazione Calcio Jesolo is an Italian association football club, based in Jesolo, Veneto.

Jesolo currently plays in Prima Categoria Veneto group G.

== History ==
The club was founded in 1929 as Gruppo Sportivo Dopolavoro Jesolo, become Associazione Calcio Jesolo on 1945.

In the 1972–73 the club won Coppa Italia Dilettanti, so it played the Barassi Cup in 1973 with Walton & Hersham F.C.

It played in serie D from 1965–66 to 1968–69 and from 1978–79 to 1985–86.

=== The refoundation ===
It was refounded on 1997 in Terza Categoria of Venice after the bankruptcy of the old company.

Since the summer 2010 with the transfer of U.S. Città di Jesolo to San Donà di Piave, the club becomes the first and only football team in the city of Jesolo.

== Colors and badge ==
The team's colors are black and blue.

== Honours ==
- Coppa Italia Dilettanti
  - Winners: 1972–73
