= Nathan Dzaba =

Slovak footballer

Personal information
- Full name: Nathan Christián Dzaba
- Date of birth: 25 August 1995 (age 31)
- Place of birth: Slovakia
- Position: Forward

Team information
- Current team: Český Brod

Youth career
- Teplice

Senior career*
Years	Team	Apps	(Gls)
2016-2017	ACD Jesolo		
2017	Pravisdomini		
2017	Melistar	4	(0)
2018	Varnsdorf	10	(0)
2019	Jílové		
2020-	Český Brod		
- * Club domestic league appearances and goals

Nathan Christián Dzaba (born 25 August 1995) is a Slovak footballer who plays as a attacker for Český Brod.

== Career ==
=== Club career ===
In 2013, Dzaba participated in Czech reality television show SuperStar. As a youth player, Dzaba joined the youth academy of Czech top flight side Teplice. In 2016, he signed for ACD Jesolo in the Italian eighth division. In 2017, he signed for Italian sixth division club Pravisdomini. After that, Dzaba signed for Melistar in the Spanish fourth division.

In 2018, he signed for Czech second division team Varnsdorf, where he suffered an injury and made 10 league appearances and scored 0 goals. On 20 July 2018, Dzaba debuted for Varnsdorf during a 1-1 draw with Znojmo. Before the second half of 2018-19, he signed for Jílové in the Czech sixth division. Before the second half of 2019-20, he signed for Czech fourth division outfit Český Brod. In 2020, Dzaba almost signed for Coton Sport in the Cameroonian top flight.

=== International career ===
He is eligible to represent Congo internationally through his father.
