= Coppa Ottorino Barassi =

Ottorino Barassi Cup (Coppa Ottorino Barassi)
- Founded: 1968
- Abolished: 1976; 50 years ago
- Region: England; Italy
- Teams: 2
- Related competitions: FA Amateur Cup; Coppa Italia Dilettanti
- Last champions: (Italy) Soresinese (1976)

The Coppa Ottorino Barassi (also called "Italian-English Amateur League Cup") is a defunct amateur association football competition named after Ottorino Barassi that was contested from 1968 until 1976. The competition was contested by the English FA Amateur Cup winners and the Italian Coppa Italia Dilettanti winners and was played over two-legs, one at each participating club's stadium.

Leytonstone F.C. were the first champions of the competition in 1968, winning on the away goals rule following a 1–1 draw in the first leg at home, and a 2–2 in the return away fixture. The following year the cup was shared after both legs finished 2–0 to the home team. The 1974 tournament was not played, and following the abolition of the FA Amateur Cup that year the English representative became the champions of the Second Division of the Isthmian League. The last instalment of the competition was in 1976, when Unione Sportiva Soresinese won following a penalty shootout. This was the only time an Italian team won the competition.

== List of champions ==
Ed.	Year	(gold) Champion	(silver) Runner-up	Aggr.
1	1968	(England) Leytonstone	(Italy) Stefer Roma	3–3 (Note: Leytonstone won on away goal rule.)
2	1969	(England) North Shields (Italy) ALMAS	– (Note: Title shared after both clubs won one match each, also tied on goal difference.)	2–2
3	1970	(England) Enfield	(Italy) Ponte San Pietro	4–2
4	1971	(England) Skelmersdale United	(Italy) Montebelluna	2–1
5	1972	(England) Hendon	(Italy) Unione Valdinievole	3–1
6	1973	(England) Walton & Hersham	(Italy) Jesolo	6–0
–	1974	(not held) (Note: Qualified teams: Bishop's Stortford and Miranese.)		
7	1975	(England) Staines Town	(Italy) Banco di Roma	3–0
8	1976	(Italy) Soresinese	(England) Tilbury	2–2 (Note: Soresineses won 5–3 on penalties.)

== Matche details ==
=== Key ===
†	Won on the away goals rule
*	Winner after a penalty shootout
**Bold**	Indicates the winner in two-legged finals

=== Match details ===
Year	Country	Home team	Score	Away team	Country	Notes
1968	ENG	**Leytonstone**	1–1	Stefer Roma	ITA	
1968	ITA	Stefer Roma	2–2 †	**Leytonstone**	ENG	
1968	Aggregate 3–3, **Leytonstone** win on away goals					
1969	ENG	**North Shields**	2–0	**ALMAS**	ITA	
1969	ITA	**ALMAS**	2–0	**North Shields**	ENG	
1969	Aggregate 2–2, **North Shields** and **ALMAS** shared the cup					
1970	ENG	**Enfield**	3–0	Ponte San Pietro	ITA	
1970	ITA	Ponte San Pietro	2–1	**Enfield**	ENG	
1970	**Enfield** won 4–2 on aggregate					
1971	ENG	**Skelmersdale United**	2–0	Montebelluna	ITA	
1971	ITA	Montebelluna	1–0	**Skelmersdale United**	ENG	
1971	**Skelmersdale United** won 2–1 on aggregate					
1972	ENG	**Hendon**	2–0	Unione Valdinievole	ITA	
1972	ITA	Unione Valdinievole	1–1	**Hendon**	ENG	
1972	**Hendon** won 3–1 on aggregate					
1973	ENG	**Walton & Hersham**	4–0	Jesolo	ITA	
1973	ITA	Jesolo	0–2	**Walton & Hersham**	ENG	
1973	**Walton & Hersham** won 6–0 on aggregate					
1974	Not played Qualifying teams: (England) Bishop's Stortford, (Italy) Miranese.					^{[a]}
1975	ITA	Banco di Roma	0–1	**Staines Town**	ENG	
1975	ENG	**Staines Town**	2–0	Banco di Roma	ITA	
1975	**Staines Town** won 3–0 on aggregate					
1976	ENG	Tilbury	1–1	**Soresinese**	ITA	
1976	ITA	**Soresinese**	1–1 *	Tilbury	ENG	
1976	Aggregate 2–2, **Soresinese** won 5–3 in a penalty shootout					
