= San Donà di Piave–Jesolo railway station =

Railway station in Italy

San Donà di Piave–Jesolo
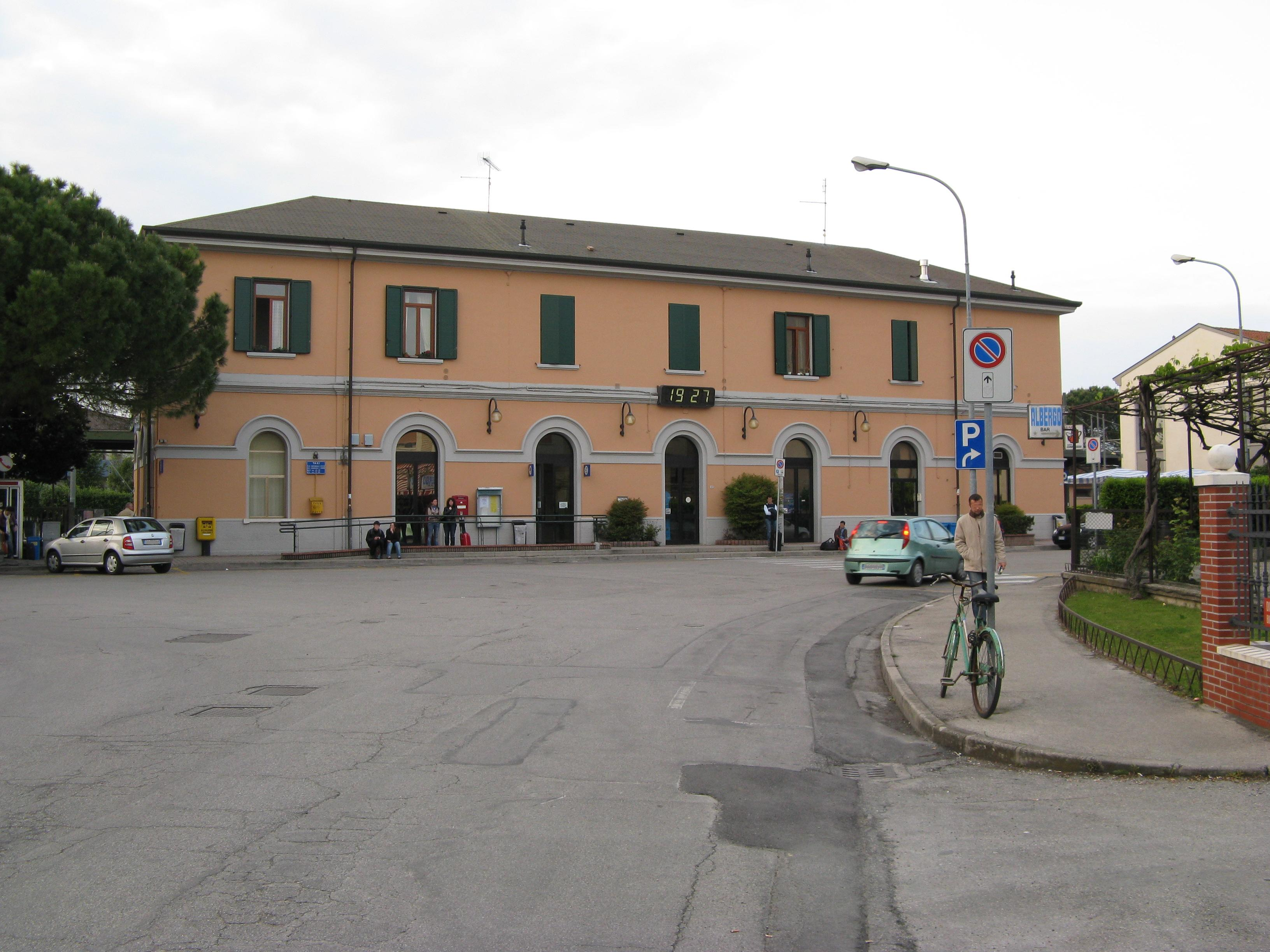
- San Donà di Piave–Jesolo railway station

General information
- Location: Via Baron 46, San Donà di Piave, Veneto; Italy
- Coordinates: 45°38′30″N 12°33′48″E
- Owner: Rete Ferroviaria Italiana
- Operator: Trenitalia
- Line: Venice–Trieste railway
- Distance: 32.786 km (20.372 mi) from Venezia Mestre
- Platforms: 3
- Tracks: 3

Other information
- Classification: Silver

History
- Opened: 1886; 140 years ago
Location
- Location within Veneto Location within Northern Italy Location within Italy

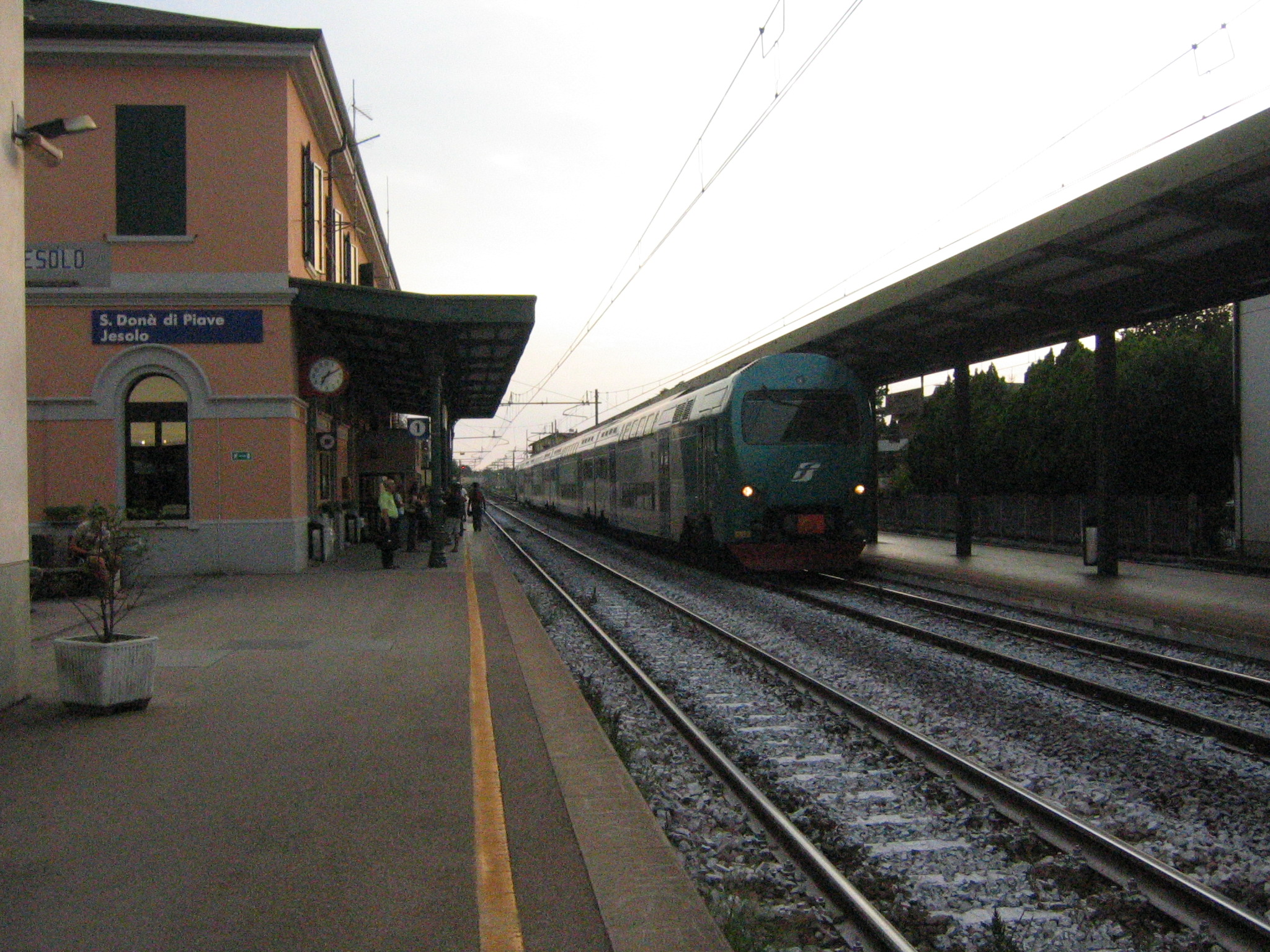
A view of the old platforms.

San Donà di Piave–Jesolo (Italian: Stazione di San Donà di Piave–Jesolo) is a railway station serving the town of San Donà di Piave and the seaside resort of Jesolo, in the region of Veneto, northern Italy. The station is located on the Venice–Trieste railway. The train services are operated by Trenitalia.

== Modernisation ==
In 2009, in anticipation of the restructuring of the services in the Veneto Region the station was moved a few hundred metres further east, towards Trieste.

== Train services ==
The station is served by the following service(s):

- High speed services (Frecciarossa) Turin - Milan - Verona - Padua - Venice - Trieste
- Intercity services Rome - Florence - Bologna - Padua - Venice - Trieste
- Express services (Regionale Veloce) Venice - Portogruaro - Cervignano del Friuli - Trieste
- Express services ( Regionale Veloce ) Verona - Padua - Venice - Latisana
- Local services (Treno regionale) Venice - Portogruaro

== See also ==
- History of rail transport in Italy
- List of railway stations in Veneto
- Rail transport in Italy
- Railway stations in Italy
