= US Città di Jesolo =

Italian football club

- Full name: Unione Sportiva Città di Jesolo SRL
- Founded: 1969 (as U.S. Lido di Jesolo); 2001 (refounded)
- Dissolved: 2010
- Ground: Stadio Armando Picchi, Jesolo, Italy
- Capacity: 2,500
- 2009–10: Serie D/C, 4th
Home colours	Away colours

Unione Sportiva Città di Jesolo was an Italian football club, based in Jesolo, Veneto.

== History ==
=== U.S. Lido di Jesolo ===
The club was founded in 1969 as Unione Sportiva Lido di Jesolo.

It last played in Promozione in the season 2009-10 placing 7th.

=== U.S. Città di Jesolo ===
In 2001 it acquired the sports title of A.C. San Donà in Serie D and becomes Unione Sportiva Città di Jesolo Jesolo won the playoff in Group C of 2004–05 Serie D. On 16 August the club promoted to replace the vacancies .

Jesolo last played in Serie D in the 2009-10 season placing 4th, after having been relegated in 2006 from Serie C2 on relegation play-out.

In Summer 2010 the club moved to San Donà di Piave, giving to the local club A.C. Sandonà 1922, from now renamed SandonàJesoloCalcio, its sport title of Serie D, acquired in 2001 and thus closing operations in Jesolo.
