= Stadio Armando Picchi (Jesolo) =

Coordinates: 45.5113°N 12.6373°E

Stadio Picchi
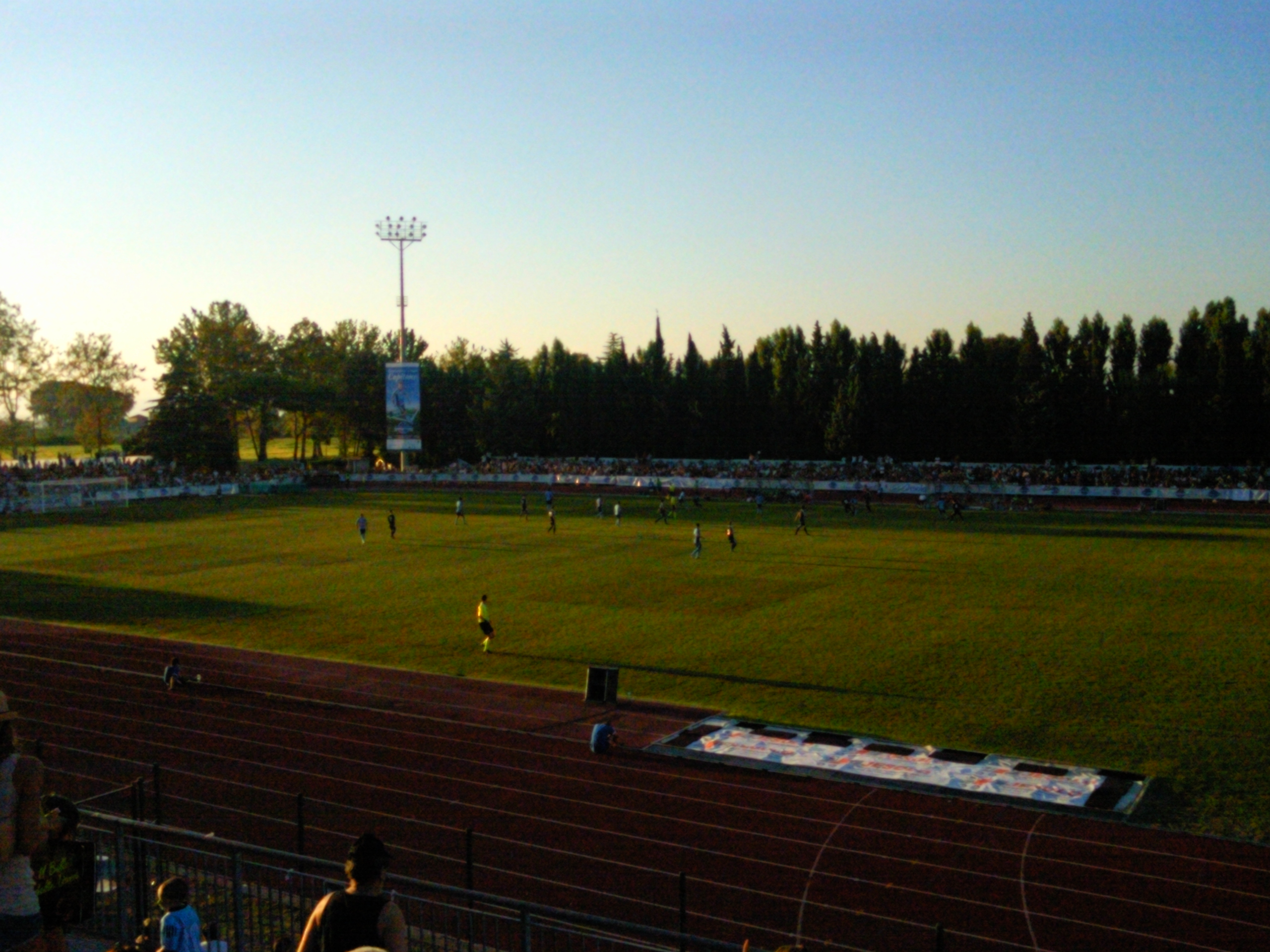
- Interactive map of Stadio Picchi
- Location: Jesolo, Italy
- Owner: APT Jesolo, Jesolo
- Capacity: 4,000

Construction
- Renovated: 2013

Tenants
- U.S. Città di Jesolo (2001–2010); Sydney FC(2013 Pre-season)

Stadio Picchi, is a multi-purpose stadium in Jesolo, Italy. It was mainly used mostly for football matches and hosted the home matches of U.S. Città di Jesolo in Serie D. The stadium has a capacity of 4,000 spectators and meets Lega Pro criteria.

== International friendlies ==
8 August 2013 Italy Tour	Udinese (Italy)	3–5	(Australia) Sydney FC	Jesolo, Italy
1am (AEST)	Unknown 2'; Unknown 40'; Unknown 48'	Report	Mallia 10', 55'; Marschel 12'; Chianese 30', 89'	Stadium: Stadio Comunale Picchi; Attendance: 3,502

13 August 2013 Italy Tour	Vicenza (Italy)	1–3	(Australia) Sydney FC	Jesolo, Italy
2am (AEST)	Coser 47'	Report	Chianese 33'; Ryall 40'; Mallia 80'	Stadium: Stadio Comunale Picchi; Attendance: 3,031

14 August 2013 Italy Tour	A.S. Cittadella (Italy)	0–1	(Australia) Sydney FC	Jesolo, Italy
1am (AEST)		Report	Italiano 35'	Stadium: Stadio Comunale Picchi; Attendance: 3,121

17 August 2013 Italy Tour	Venezia (Italy)	1–0	(Australia) Sydney FC	Jesolo, Italy
2am (AEST)	Bocalon 3'	Report		Stadium: Stadio Comunale Picchi; Attendance: 4,012

== Historic Matches ==
On 18 August 1985, the stadium hosted the first match ever played by the United States women's national soccer team, who were defeated by a score of 1–0 by the Italy women's national football team.
