= Jesolo =

Comune in the Metropolitan City of Venice

Jesolo Gèzoło (Venetian)
- Comune
- Città di Jesolo
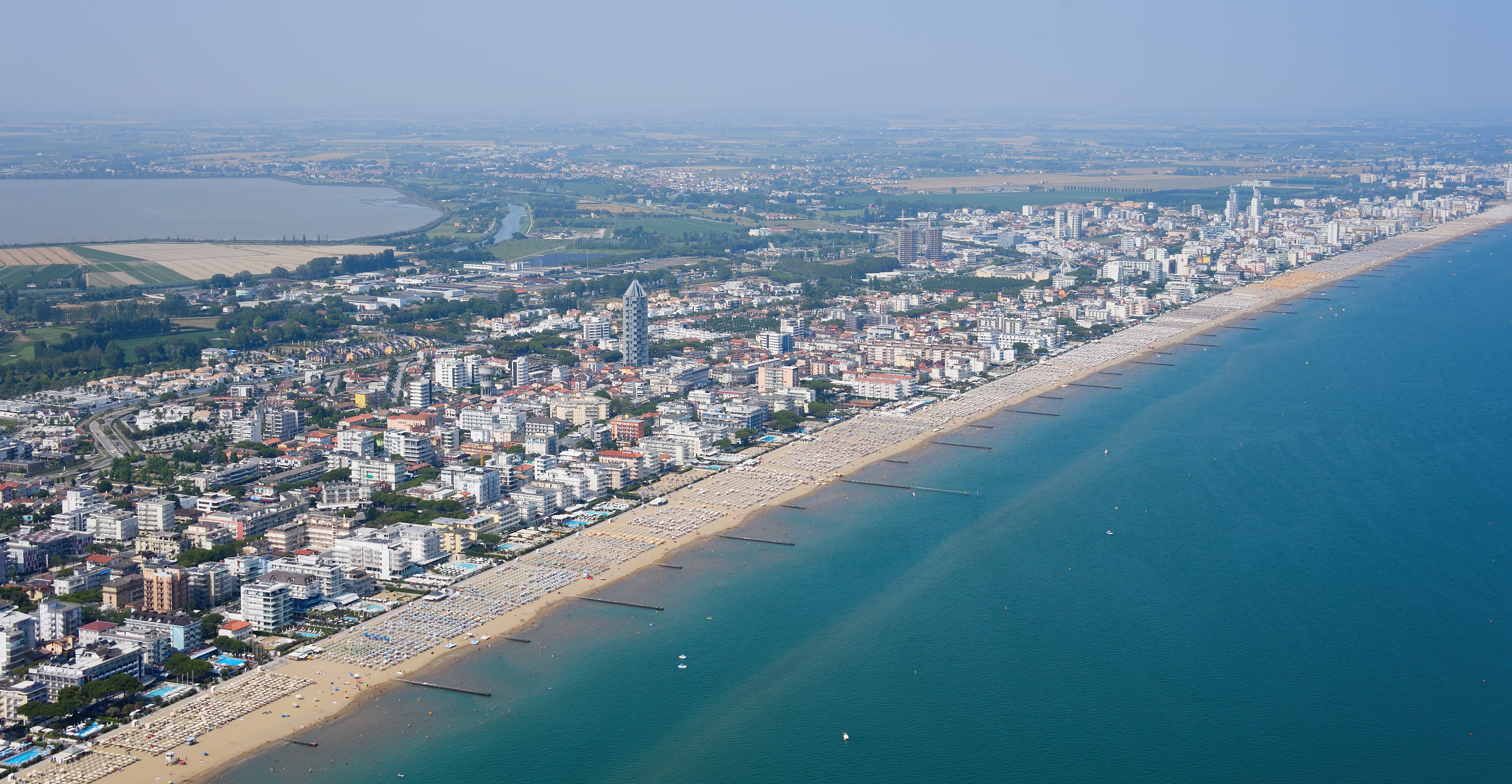
- The beach of Jesolo

- Coat of arms

- Location within Italy Location within Veneto
- Coordinates: 45°32′02″N 12°38′27″E
- Country: Italy
- Region: Veneto
- Metropolitan city: Venice (VE)
- Frazioni: Jesolo Lido, Jesolo Pineta, Passarella di Sotto, Cortellazzo, Ca' Pirami, Ca' Fornera, Passarella di Sotto, Piave Nuovo, Ca' Nani

Government
  - Mayor: Christofer De Zotti

Area
  - Total: 95 km^{2} (37 sq mi)
- Elevation: 0 m (0 ft)

Population (2025)
  - Total: 27,146
  - Density: 290/km^{2} (740/sq mi)
- Demonym: Jesolani
- Time zone: UTC+1 (CET)
  - Summer (DST): UTC+2 (CEST)
- Postal code: 30016
- Dialing code: 0421
- Patron saint: St. John the Baptist
- Saint day: 24 June
- Website: Official website

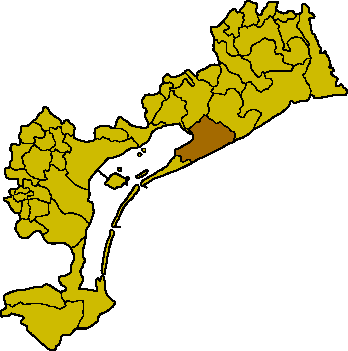
Location of Jesolo in the metropolitan city of Venice.

Jesolo (Italian pronunciation: [ˈjɛːzolo]; Venetian: Gèzoło) is a seaside resort town and comune of 27,146 inhabitants in the Metropolitan City of Venice, Italy. With around 1.3 million visitors per year, Jesolo ranks second among beach resorts in the country, and third in terms of nights spent there (ca 5.65 million in 2025). It ranks 7th overall as a tourist destination in Italy, behind the major cities of Rome, Milan, Venice and Florence. With 204,711.4 visits per thousand inhabitants, it is also one of the 50 Italian towns with the greatest tourist pressure. Its 15 kilometres (9 miles) of beaches and proximity to Central Europe make it a destination for many German, Austrian, Dutch and French visitors.

== History ==
In Roman times the lagoon extended over the area now occupied by the town. There were several islands in the lagoon, the biggest of which was known as Equilium, the place of horses. It is thought that Jesolo represents a corruption of this name.

Following the fall of the Western Roman Empire, barbarian invasions occurred in Italy and the Veneto hinterland. This caused a migration from Roman cities, such as Altino, to the safer islands of the lagoon. With the Byzantine reconquest of the lagoon area, the district of Venetikà was created, first as part of the Exarchate of Italy and then as the Duchy of Venice. Equilio was one of the founding cities of this duchy and subsequently followed the fortunes of the Venetian Republic. Some of the first Dukes (Dogi) are traditionally consider to have been born in Equilio. The city became a flourishing center and subsequently was made the seat of a diocese. After that, a series of events (such as the movement of the patricians to Venice, the silting up of the lagoon, and the worsening of environmental conditions) led to a slow decline, culminating in 1466 with the suppression of the diocese.

=== Origin of the name ===
The ancient name of Jesolo was Equilium (from the Latin equos or from Venetic ekvo) which means "town of horses". The name refers to the breeding of horses, for which the ancient Venetians were famous. The current name of Jesolo probably comes from a series of transcription errors of the oldest name (Equilo, Esulo, Lesulo, Jexulo, Jexollo, Jesolum, Giesolo). From the 16th century until 1930, Jesolo was called Cavazuccherina. This name came from the canal of the same name (in Venetian Cava), opened on 20 April and built by Alvise Zucharin (Zuccherina).

The official spelling used by the municipality is Jesolo but in the same time, the spelling Iesolo is also erroneously used. The use of "J" here is a rare example of a retained archaism, as the letter does not exist in the modern standard Italian alphabet, except in loanwords and proper names.

== Geography ==
The town lies along the coast north-east of Venice, between Eraclea and Cavallino-Treporti. Jesolo gives its name to a lagoon of 22 square kilometres (8.5 mi^{2}) on the Adriatic Sea between the rivers Sile and Piave. The urbanized area lies on an island of sorts, delimited by the rivers Piave (on the east) and Sile (on the west), and an artificial canal called Cavetta, which starts from the center of Jesolo and goes towards Cortellazzo.

The Jesolo area stretches along the Venetian coast on a flat landscape overlooking the Adriatic Sea and edged by Jesolo’s own lagoon (22 km), and by the rivers Sile and Piave. This latter is edged by the opposite Laguna del Mort. The valley of Dragojesolo together with that of Grassabò, is the largest in the northern lagoon of Venice. The coastal strip is low and sandy, consisting of a beach some 15 kilometres long (including the spiaggia del Morto on the east side of the river Piave) and varying in thickness between 30 and 100 metres.

== Main sights ==
=== Medieval remains ===
The main medieval remains from ancient Equilio are now part of the Antiche Mura (Ancient Walls) archeological site, north of Jesolo's old town, and actively studied by researchers from the University of Venice Ca' Foscari. The two main buildings are the Santa Maria Assunta cathedral and the church/monastery of San Mauro.

The former was built in the IX century, and was the see for the diocese of Equilium until its liquidation, second in importance only to San Mark's Basilica in Venice, perhaps even used as a model for the latter. The original architecture and internal decorations have not survived, but it is known that the building has a Latin Cross floorplan, divided into three naves. The overall size was 25 by 46 meters, with a height of around 30 meters. After Bishop Andrea Bon's death in 1466, pope Paul II decreed the suppression of the diocese. The cathedral was abandoned and used as a source of construction material elsewhere.

San Mauro's monastery dates back to the 7th - 14th century, and was partially brought to light in 1954. Excavations undertaken in 2018-19 revealed traces of a small, older church dating back to the 9th century, as well as the stone foundations of a bell tower, numerous graves in the nearby burial ground, a Venetian-style well, a wharf made of both wooden and stone structures.

=== Museums ===
The town has three museums:

- The Military History Museum "Vidotto", hosting a permanent collection of uniforms, weapons and vehicles belonging to the Italian armed and police forces, ranging from the end of the 19th century to now.
- JMuseo, a new four-story, 27-meter facility dedicated to exhibitions on contemporary and modern art. There is a permanent exhibition on Jesolo's Memories, while in the recent past the museum hosted exhibitions such as "Loving Picasso" and "Banksy and Friends".
- The Civic Museum of Natural History, now permanently hosted by JMuseo, has around 15,000 items representing the European and palearctic fauna (birds, mammals, fish, reptiles), and a rich collection of some 25,000 volumes and magazines.

Many remains and findings from the area of ancient Jesolo are preserved within the National Archaeological Museum of Altino.

Other town facilities include the public library, located in the old town, the Sandro Pertini centre for senior citizens, and the ex-Guardia di Finanza headquarters in the fishing village of Cortellazzo, which has been restructured to host exhibitions about local history and culture.

=== Modern architecture ===
The city has seen large amounts of development in terms of new buildings in the past twenty years, leading to a remaking of its skyline, now ranked as fifth or sixth overall in Italy, with 7 highrise buildings between 80 and 100 meters in height, and 6 more over 50 meters.

The tallest buildings in town are:

1. Torre Aquileia (94 meters to the top of the antenna, 22 floors).
2. Piazza Drago twin towers, Alioth and Mizar (2 x 92 meters at the antenna, 84m at the roof, 22 floors).
3. Wave Twin Towers (2 x 88 meters, 25 floors, under construction).
4. Richard Meier Tower] (85 meters, 25 floors, under construction).
5. Merville Tower (84 meters, 26 floors).
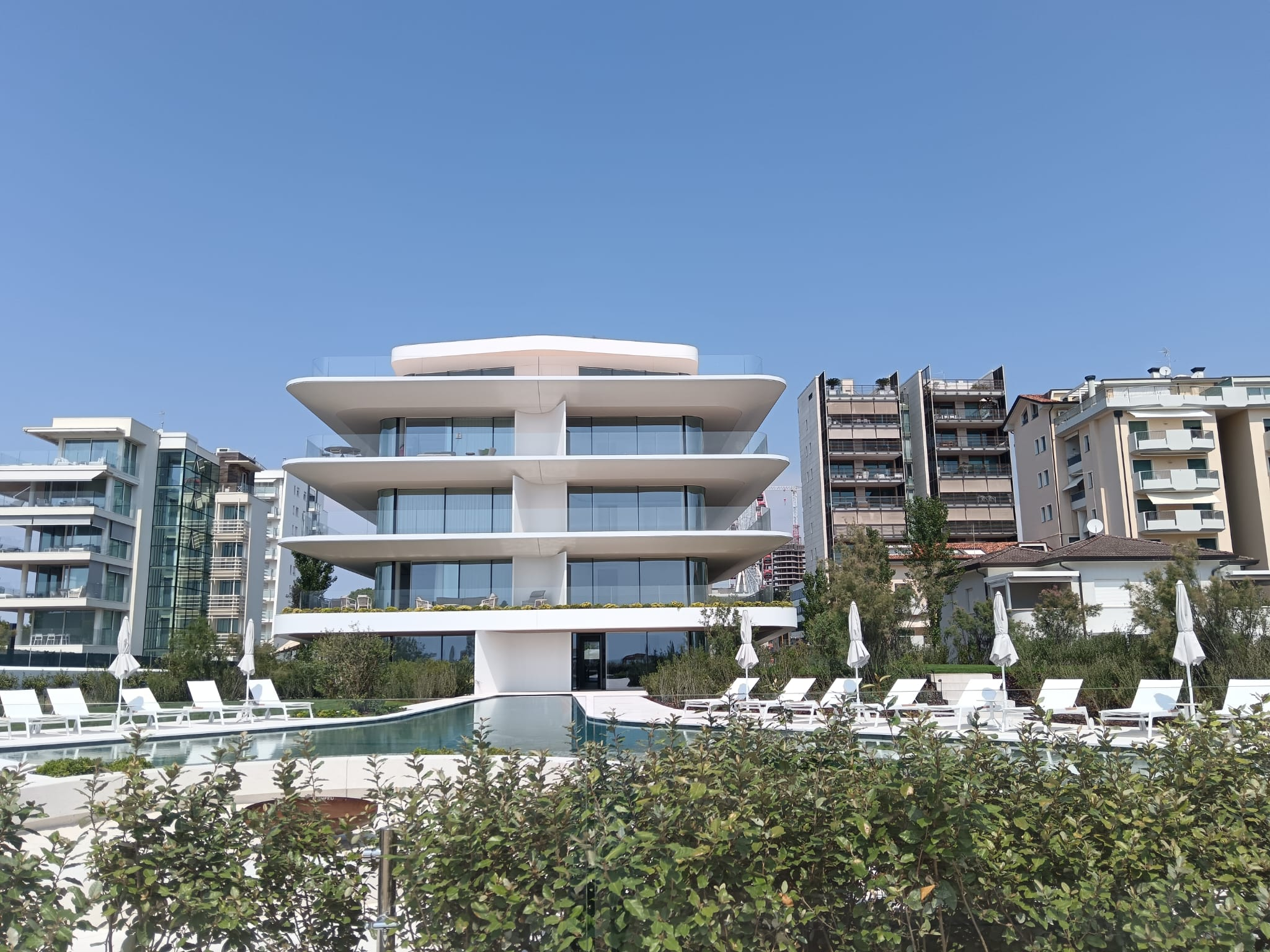
  Atoll residence in Jesolo.
6. Residence Pineta (60 meters, 20 floors).
7. Residence Palace (54 meters, 17 floors).
8. Wave Gold Tower (54 meters, 17 floors).
9. Hotel Caravelle (51 meters, 16 floors).
10. Marlin tower (50 meters, 15 floors).
11. G-tower (47 meters, 15 floors).

Other significant modern buildings include the award-winning Podium], The Atoll (by Jacopo Mascheroni architect) and the upcoming Etoile.

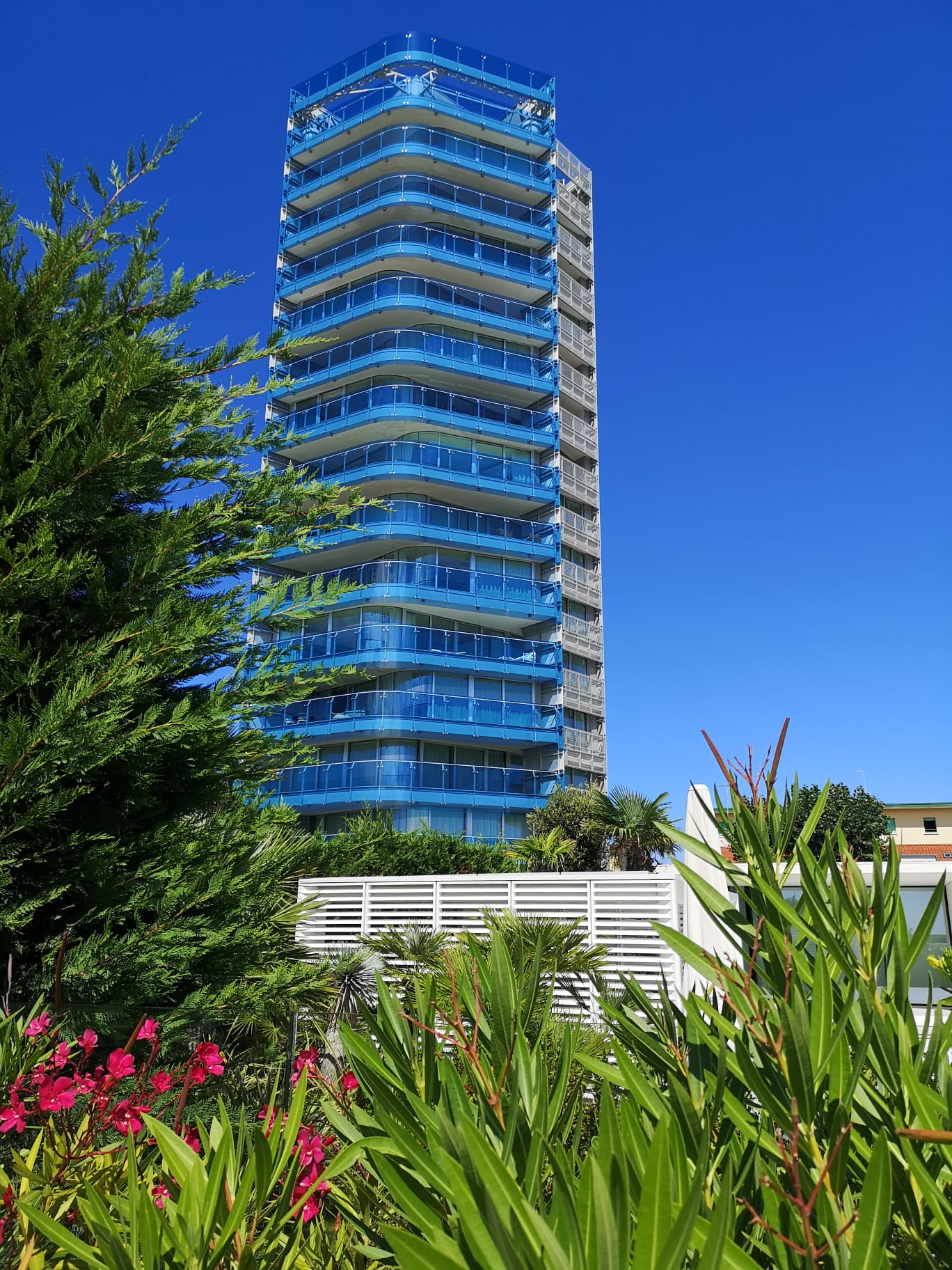
Jesolo's G-tower

Several other highrise apartment blocks are in the pipeline, including the Green Wave - Vivalto tower (25 floors, 90 meters), the two Wave Green towers (55 meters, 17 floors), and two 50 meters buildings near the Marina.

=== Parks and gardens ===
The city hosts two major public gardens: Parco Pegaso (Pegasus park), which occupies an area of about 10 hectares located near the major Via Roma dx highway, and Parco Ca' Silis, near the historical centre. Parco Pegaso is a thematic park divided into 9 sub-areas, inspired by Greek mythology: Porta Ombrosa (the Shaded Gate), il Giardino di Atena (Athena's Garden), i Cavalloni di Poseidone (Poseidon's Rollers), il Labirinto di Medusa (Medusa's Laborinth), il Giardino di Pegaso (Pegasus' Garden), lo Specchio di Andromeda (Andromeda's Mirror), il Teatro Verde (the Green Theatre), il pic-nic Sotto le Stelle (Picnic under the Stars) and il Giardino di Zeus (the Garden of Zeus). It is usually open between 9:00 and 18:00 (9:00 and 20:00 or 21:00) in the summer.

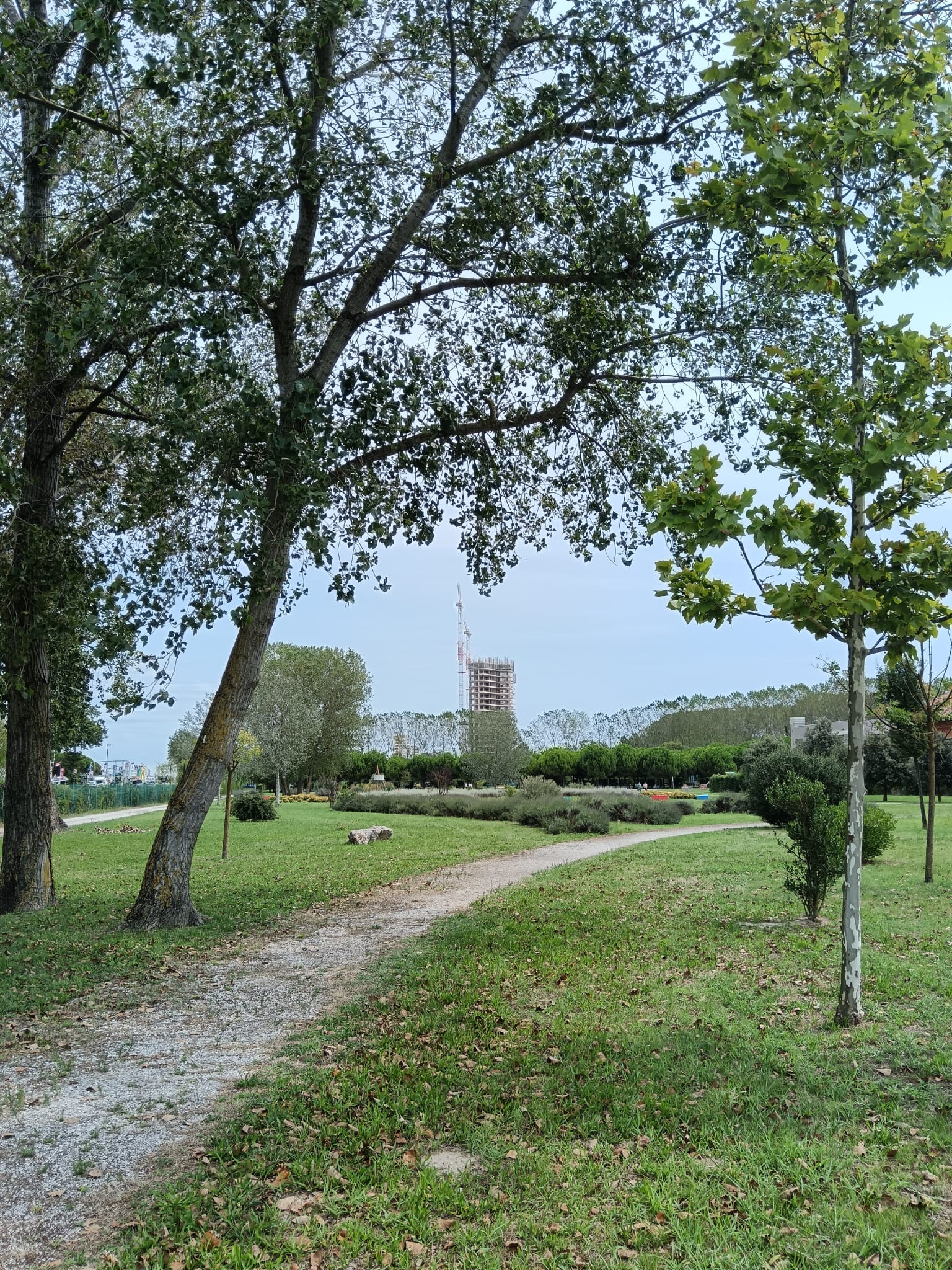
Pegasus park in Jesolo.

Parco Ca' Silis, which also contains an area called "Parco Diritti dei Bambini" (Children's rights park) is a large, 70,000 square meter green spaces which bridges the old town of Jesolo with the Lido area, located along the Sile river. It is a popular, children-friendly recreational area known for its modern skatepark, sports facilities and picnic zones. It features four areas with accessible games for children, as well as petanque (bocce) pitches and two small ponds.

Other major city parks are Parco Grifone, located behind Milano Square (18,525 square meters), with playgrounds and relaxation areas Parco Trieste, near the square of the same name and the church of Santa Maria Ausiliatrice (4.570 square meters), and Parco Pineta, located in the heart of Jesolo's pine wood district. With its 16.573 square meters the park, designed by famous Portuguese professional João Ferreira Nunes, is criss-crossed by evocative elevated wooden paths.

Other green areas include new Parco degli Aviatori, in the Jesolo 2 development, and Parco Chico Mendes, along via Ca' Gamba.

=== Churches ===
Jesolo is divided into 6 Roman Catholic parishes. The main churches attached to those are:

- San Giovanni Battista (St John the Baptist). The current building is the last in a series of churches dating back to 1102/1118. A second church was erected in 1495, above the remains of the older church of Santa Lucia. A third shrine in the 18th Century was the results of works to enlarge the previous building. Finally, construction of the existing church started in 1910, under the auspices of the Patriarch of Venice Cavallari. Works stopped because of World War I, but resumed afterwards and completed in 1924. It is the seat of the Monsignor presiding over the Vicariato (Vicarage) of Jesolo-Cavallino Treporti.
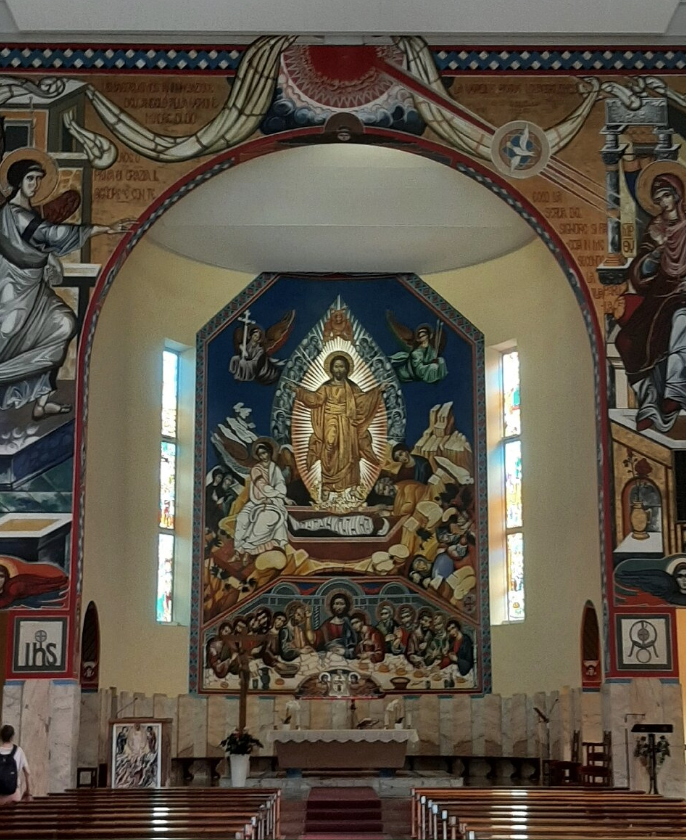
- Interno della chiesa di Santa Maria Ausiliatrice a Jesolo
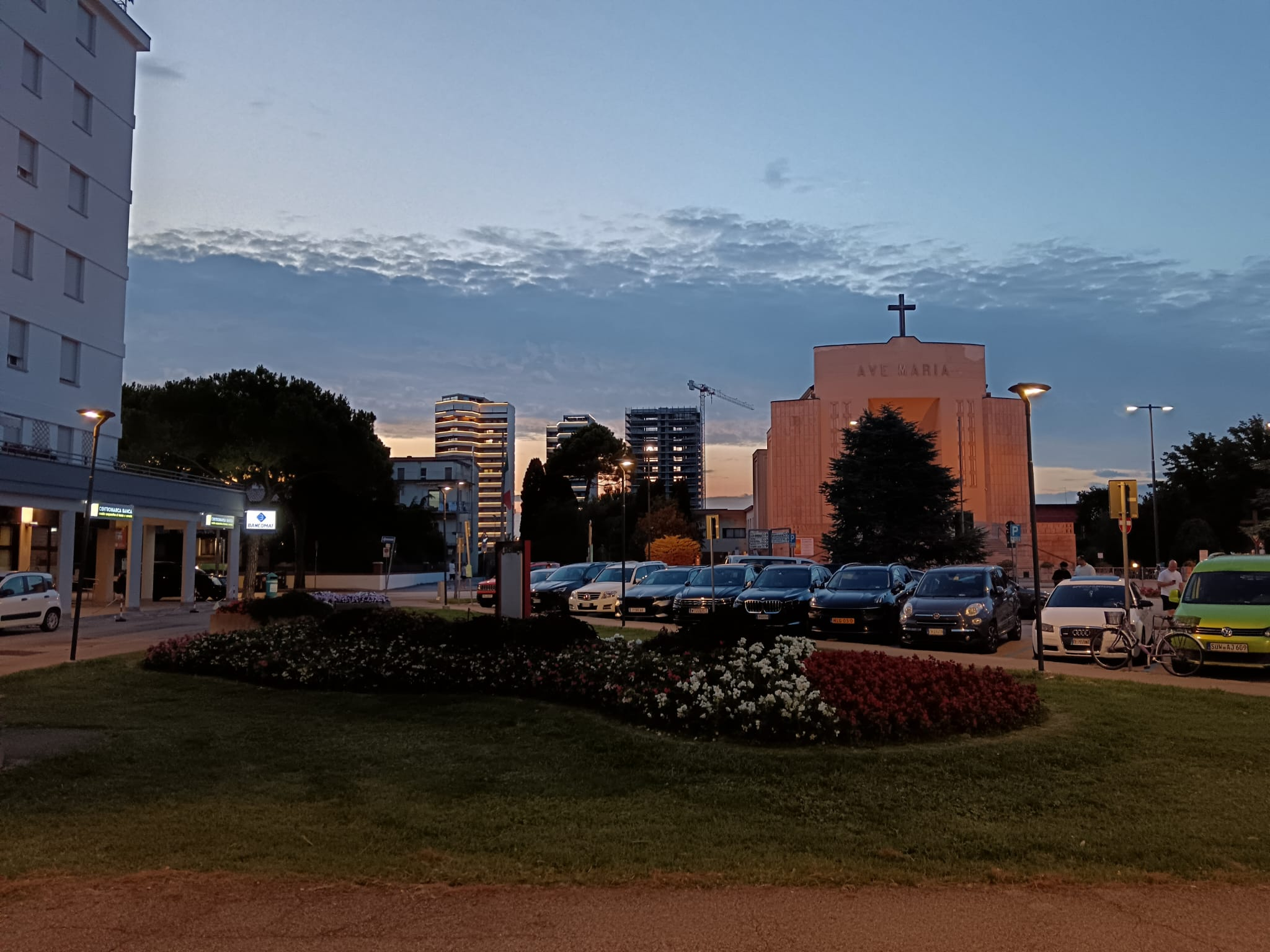
  View of piazza Trieste, with the church of Santa Maria Ausiliatrice.
  The church of Santa Maria Ausiliatrice (St Mary Help of Christians), in Trieste square, is the largest and more monumental religious building in the city. Construction started in 1950, under Patriarch Carlo Agostini, with the parish formally instituted on November 21 1954. It is divided into two levels. The main upper church is decorated with rather original Orthodox-style paintings and nice stained-glass windows. The entrance is characterized by a monumental white staircase, with a view of the opposite piazza Trieste the recent high-rise buildings.
- Notable for its modern architecture is the recent Chiesa del Cuore Immacolato di Maria, part of the Piazza Trento parish, designed by architect Devis Rampazzo and finished in 2014, in the far west of the Lido. The church's architecture is shaped like a ship, moored on the town's beach, and ready to sail. A statue of Mary is placed on top of the bell tower, as if to guide the ship from its bow towards the Garden of Eden, holding the scepter of “Capitana da mar”, as in the Venetian tradition.

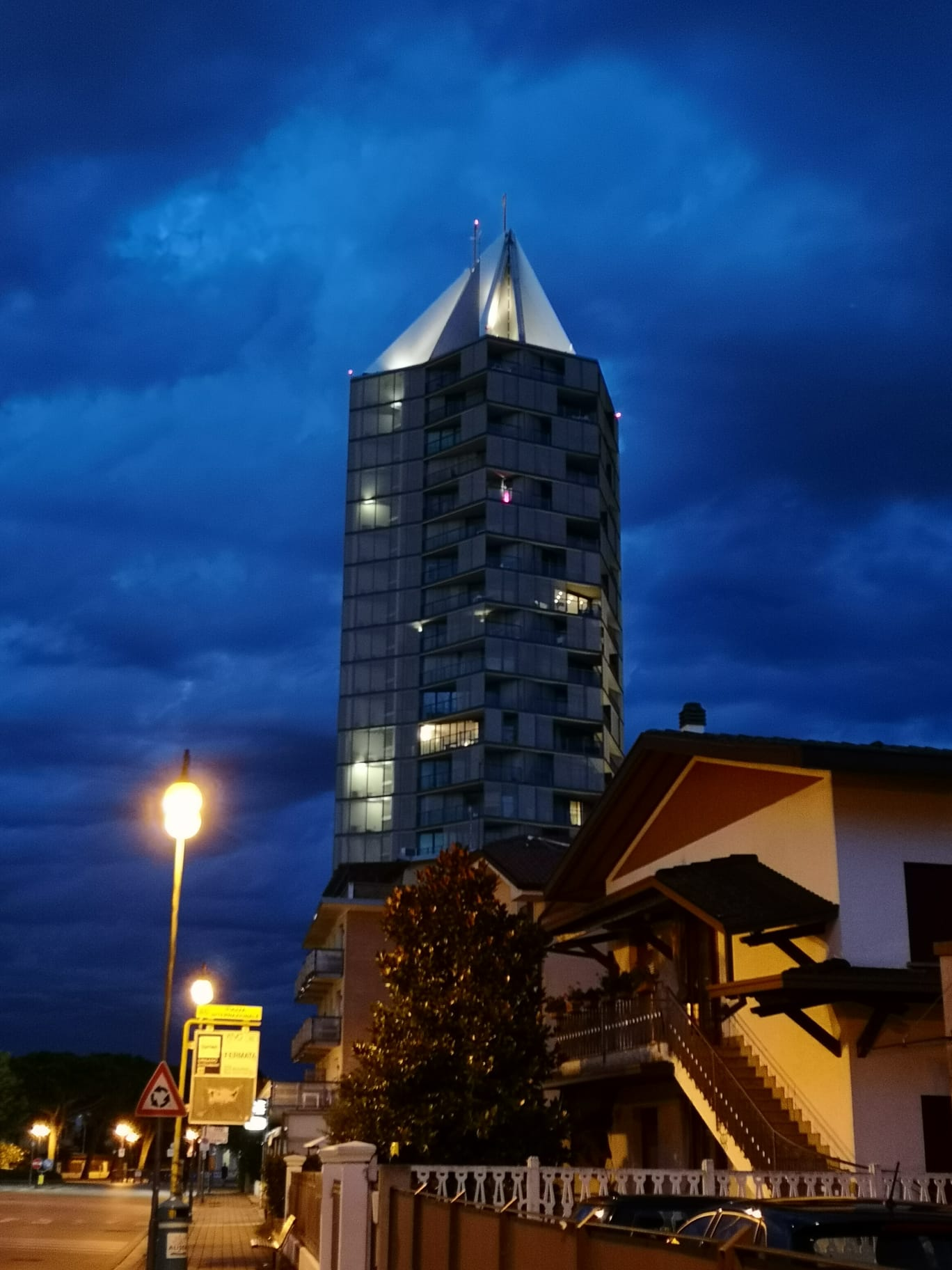
Aquileia Tower in Jesolo

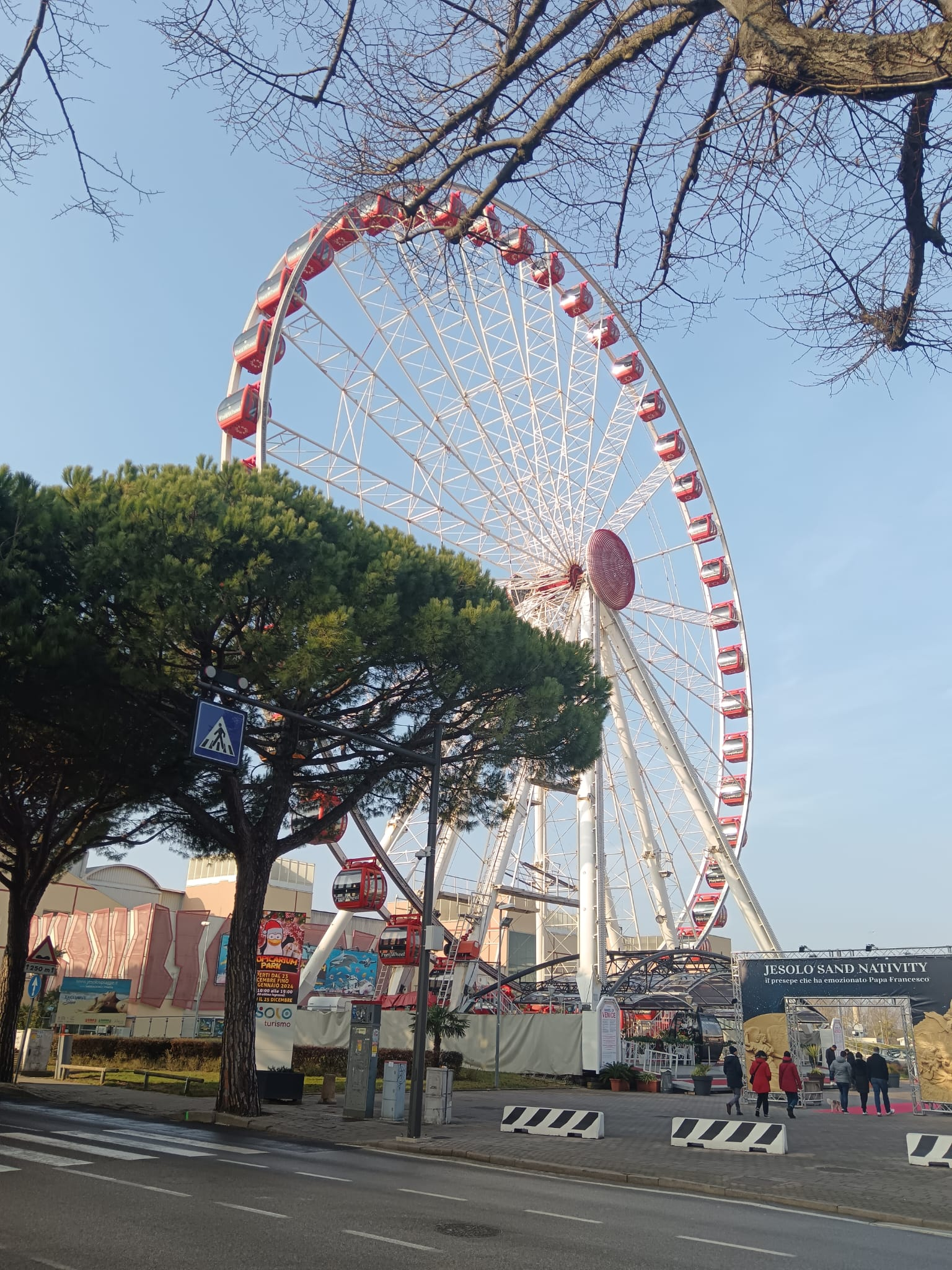
Jesolo's panoramic wheel

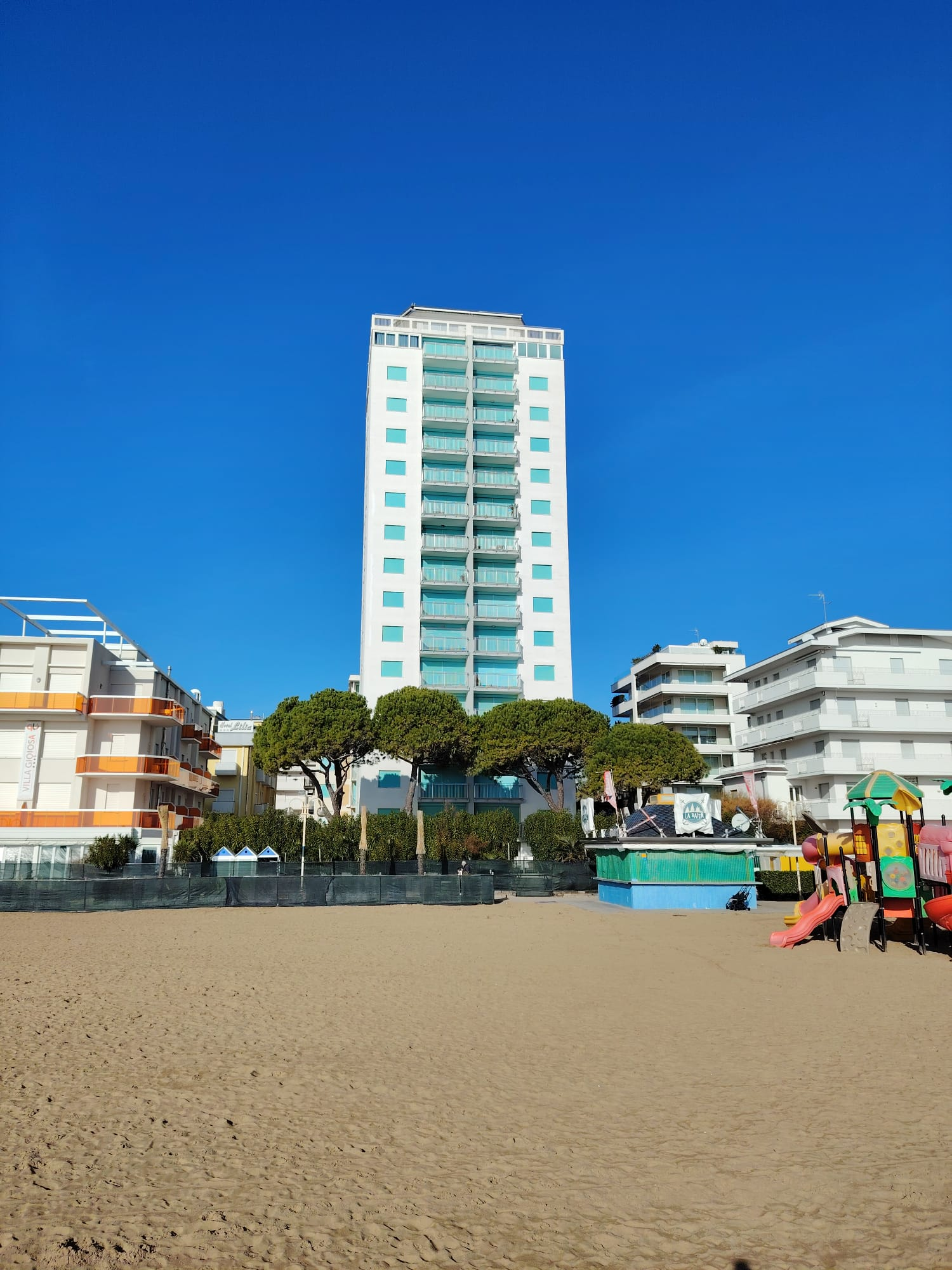
Residence Palace

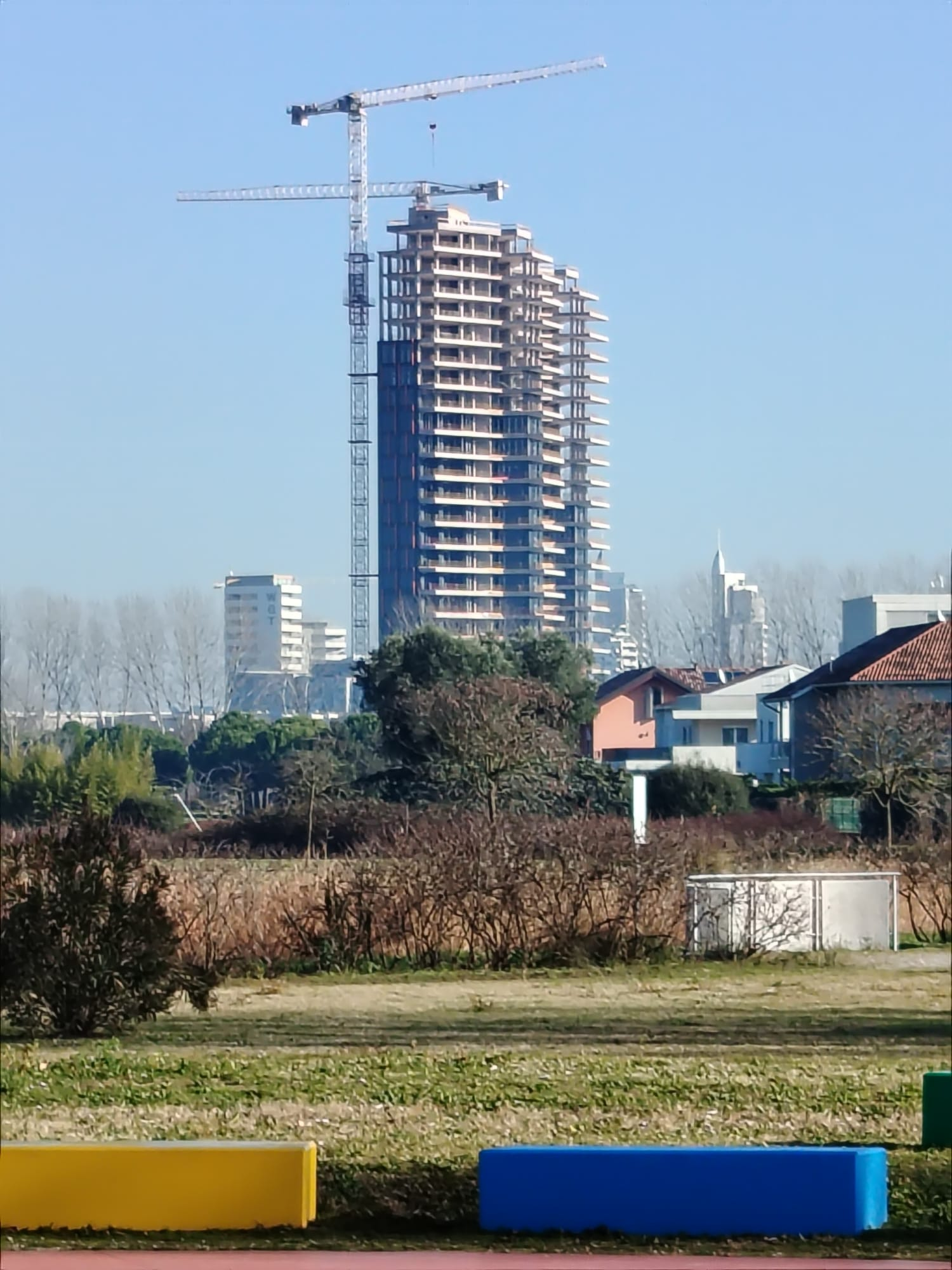
View of Downtown Jesolo from Park Pegasus, with the Wave Twin Towers in the foreground.

== Sport ==
The local football team, A.C. Jesolo, is based at the Stadio Armando Picchi and plays in the Prima Categoria Veneto group G.

Jesolo hosts the City of Jesolo Trophy, an international gymnastics competition.

== Economy ==
The city's economy is mostly based on tourism. Jesolo is a seaside resort with holiday facilities and its 15-kilometre (9 mi) beach called Lido di Jesolo. At the height of its popularity, in the late 1980s, Jesolo was hosting 6.5 million tourists per year.

After the Covid-19 crisis, Jesolo has steadily recovered to consistently register around 5.5 million stays per year (5.65 million in 2025), making the third most popular beach destination in Italy, with almost 1.3 million visitors in the year.

The city has almost 400 hotels, including three five-star establishments (with two more expected in the near future), some 20,000 apartments and seven campsites. Jesolo has around 200 restaurants and 2,500 shops, roughly half of which are concentrated along the main high street (via Bafile and its continuations), which becomes a limited traffic zone after 8pm during the summer.

A 2025 poll crowned Jesolo as the "most popular beach destination" in Italy, with 3,421 votes against Rimini's 3,347, as well as the "most trendy" one, ahead of Riccione and Cervia - Milano Marittima.

A 2023 analysis showed that, at the time, the added value of Jesolo's tourism sector was around 1.2 billion euros.

== Infrastructure and Transport ==
The main highways leading to Jesolo are the Regional Highway 43 (Portegrandi - Jesolo) and the Jesolana Highway 42.

Numerous projects are ongoing to provide a permanent solution to Jesolo's access traffic issues. The most important one is Autostrada del Mare, an 18-kilometer toll motorway connecting Meolo on the A4 motorway with Jesolo's Frova roundabout. It is unclear when works will start. Completion will take 3 years.

The Veneto region has recently funded for 50 million euros the completion of Jesolo's ring road, linking via Mediterraneo with the eastern section of Lido di Jesolo near piazza Torino. Works should start in 2027 and finish by 2029.

Most recently, discussions have started on the doubling of the existing Jesolana between the main roundabout in central Lido e the bridge connecting Jesolo to nearby Cavallino (4.8 kilometers, over 70 million estimated cost).

The town is not directly served by a railway; the closest railway station is San Dona' di Piave - Jesolo, in the town of San Dona', some 22 kilometers away. A preliminary study of the feasibility of a train link to Jesolo has recently been suggested.

A year-long urban bus transit system is maintained by Azienda Trasporti Veneto Orientale (ATVO). The two main lines are 2 (bus station - Faro) and 3 (bus station - Cortellazzo). The lines 5 and 5/ from Jesolo to Punta Sabbioni also serve stops within the western section of town.

== Notable people ==
- Petrus de Natalibus (d. circa 1400), bishop of Equilio from 1370 to his death, and author who compiled the widely circulated book Legends of the Saints.
- Matteo Momentè (b. 1987), Italian footballer who had played for Inter Milan in the early 2000s but now plays for Pistoiese.
- Gloria Campaner, Italian pianist.

== Twin towns ==
- Velden am Wörther See, Austria, since 2006
- Epinal, France

== Gallery ==
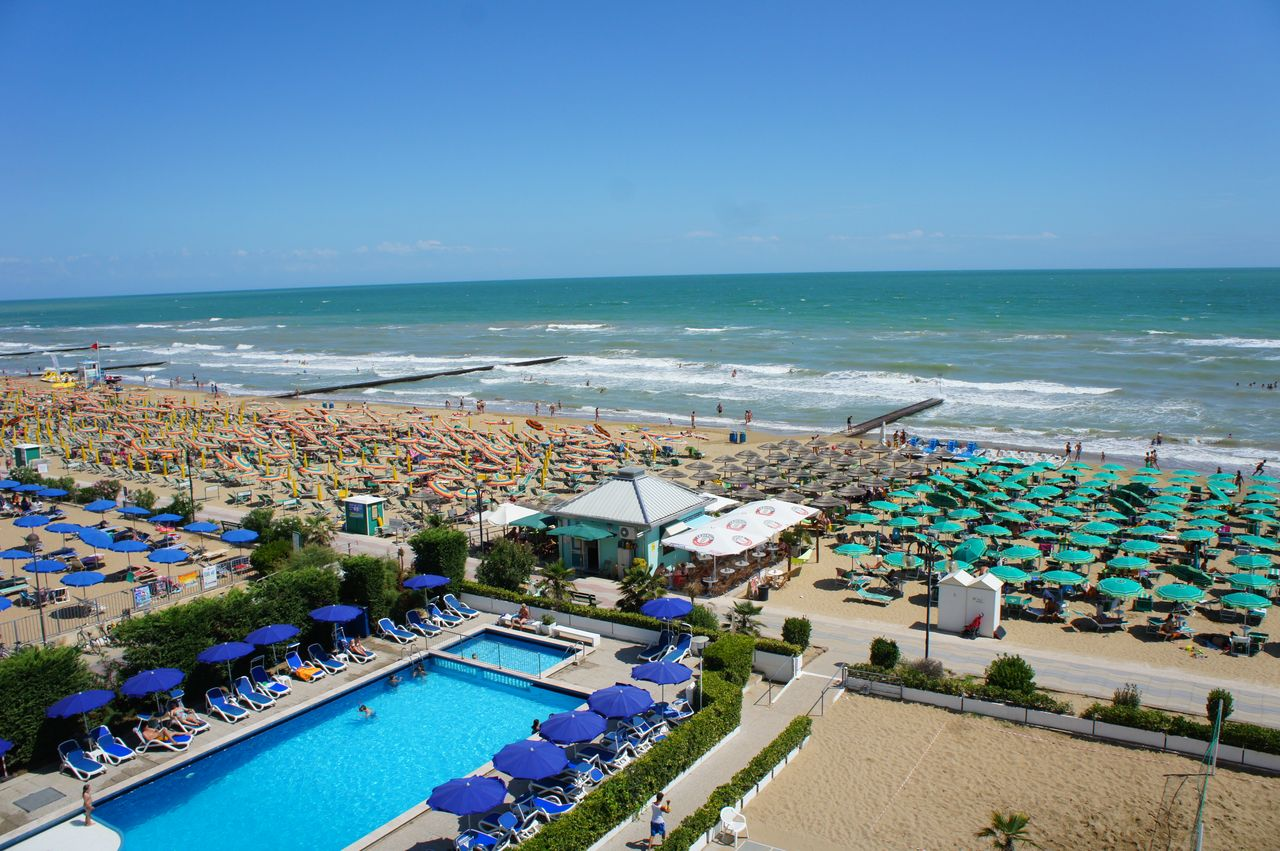

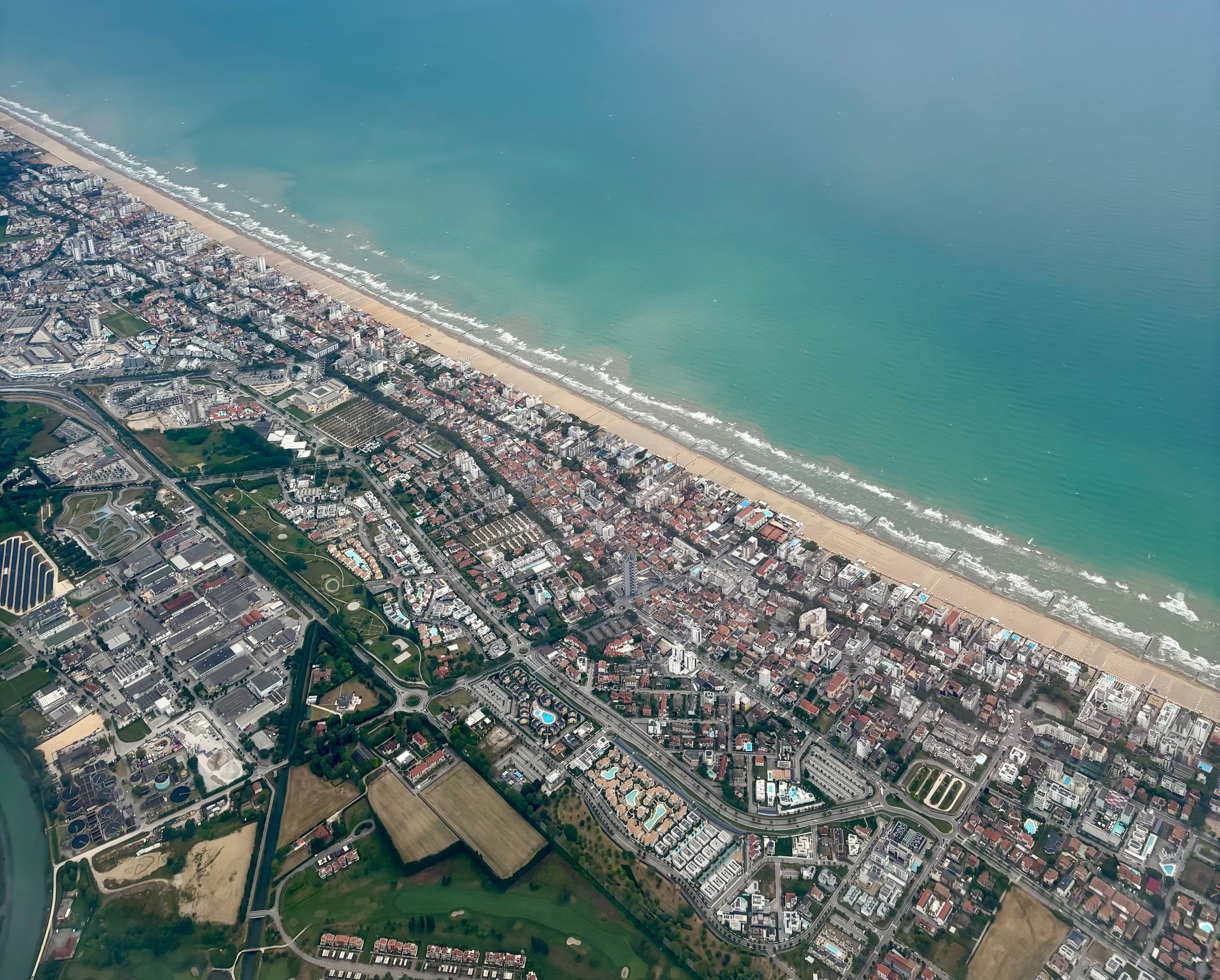

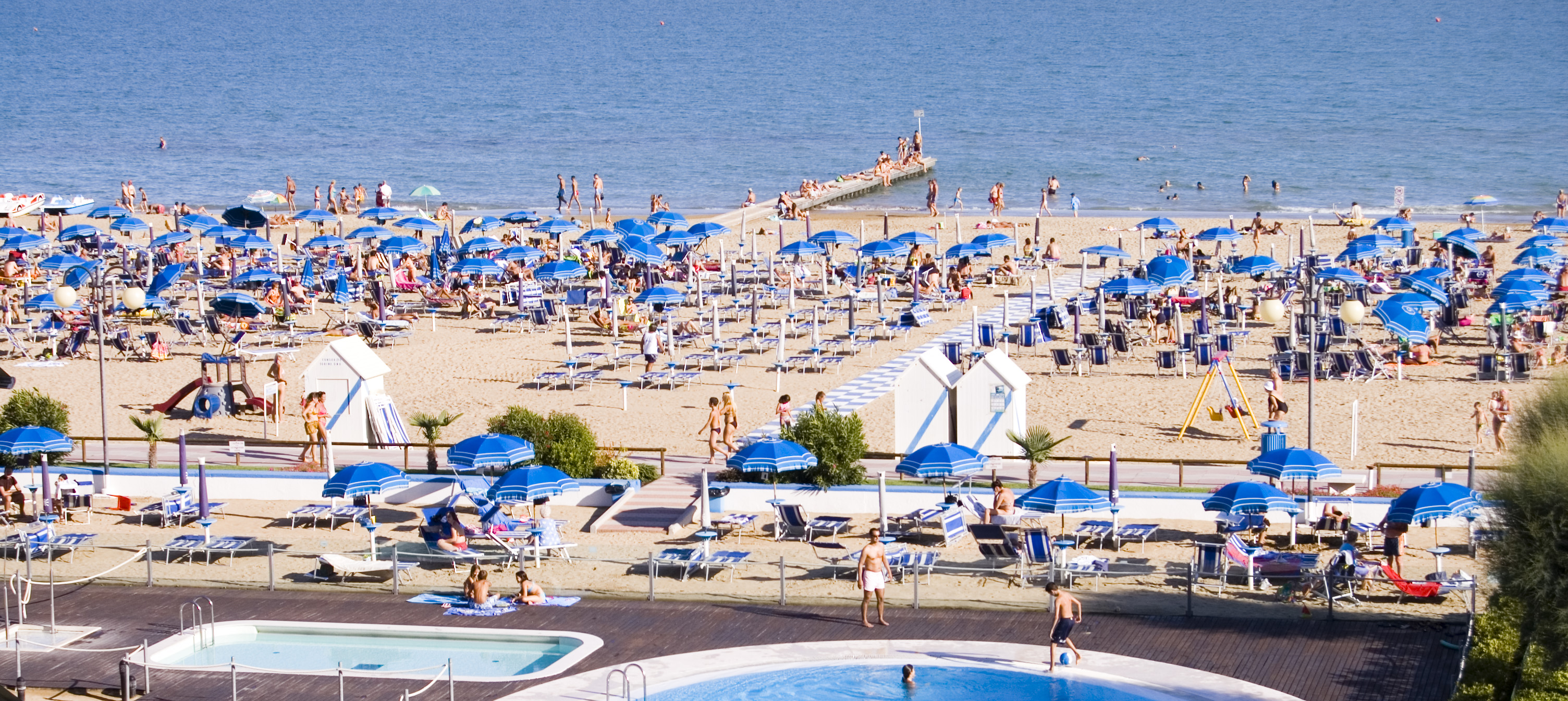

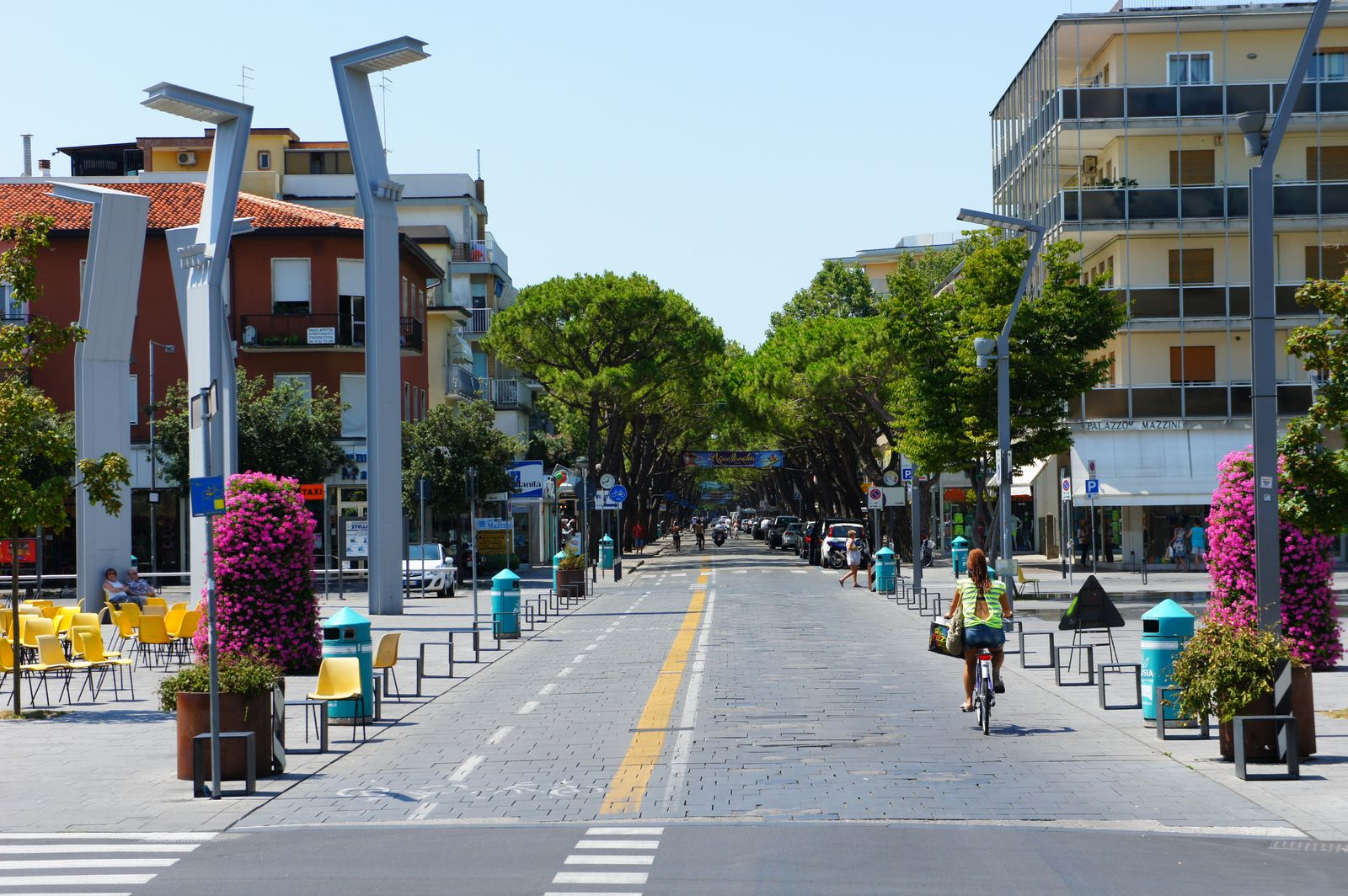

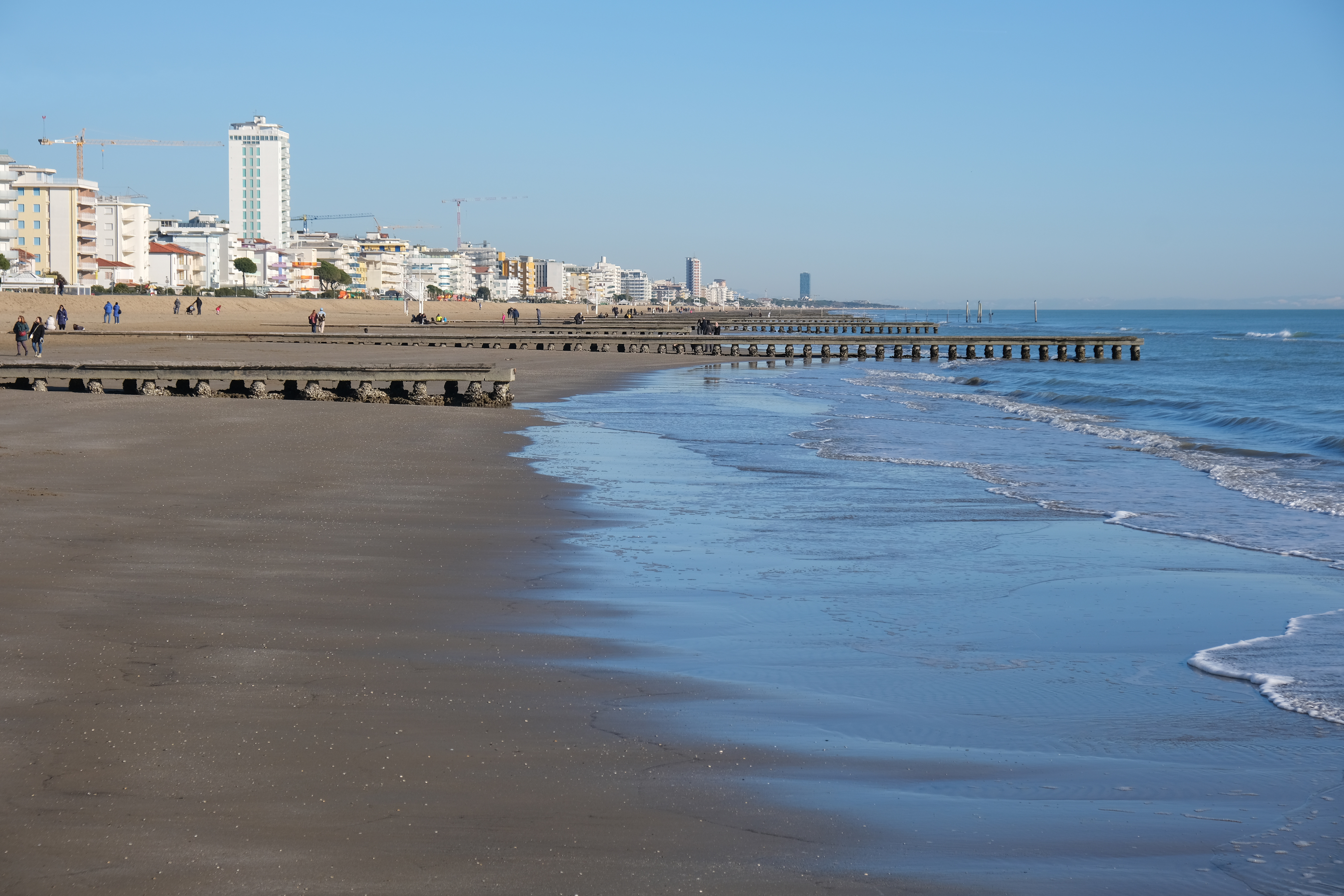
