= 2026 Beach Soccer Africa Cup of Nations =

Coupe d'Afrique des Nations de Beach Soccer 2026

Tournament details
- Host country: Senegal
- Dates: 28 November – 6 December
- Teams: 8 (from 1 confederation)

The 2026 Beach Soccer Africa Cup of Nations (French: Coupe d'Afrique des Nations de Beach Soccer 2026) is the upcoming seventh edition of the Beach Soccer Africa Cup of Nations (BSAfCON), the premier international beach soccer tournament in Africa, contested by men's national teams of the member associations of CAF. In total, this will be the 13th edition of Africa's continental beach soccer championship, counting the FIFA Beach Soccer World Cup qualification events staged by Beach Soccer Worldwide (BSWW) from 2006 until the tournament's rebranding in 2015.

It will be hosted in Senegal for the second time, having previously staged the tournament in 2021, and is scheduled to take place from 28 November to 6 December 2026. The competition will also double as the African qualifiers for the 2027 FIFA Beach Soccer World Cup, with qualification granted to both finalists.

Senegal are the five-time defending champions, having won every edition consecutively since 2016.

== Qualification ==
Of the 54 CAF member associations, 17 entered the qualifying competition, with hosts Senegal automatically qualifying for the final tournament. The other 16 teams were seeded according to their results in the previous three editions of the competition. The four lowest-ranked teams entered the first round, while the remaining 12 teams received a bye to the second round. The seven winners then will join Senegal in the final tournament.

=== First round ===
Team 1	Agg.	Team 2	1st leg	2nd leg
Mauritius	3–10	Angola	0–4	3–6
Kenya	w/o	Libya	—	—

=== Second round ===
Team 1	Agg.	Team 2	1st leg	2nd leg
Angola	5–4	Egypt	4–2	1–2
Libya	3–11	Morocco	2–4	1–7
Ivory Coast	7–9	Mauritania	3–2	4–7
Tanzania	2–4	Mozambique	1–1	1–3
Seychelles	3–16	Malawi	2–6	1–10
Burundi	10–13	Uganda	4–4	6–9
Nigeria	7–10	Ghana	3–3 (Note: Initially, after the match ended in a draw, it proceeded to extra time, which ended 4–4, followed by a penalty shoot-out in which Ghana won 5–4. However, several hours later, the refereeing team acknowledged that extra time and the penalty shoot-out had been played in error, and the original 3–3 scoreline at the end of regular time was retained.)	4–7

=== Qualified teams ===
The following eight teams have qualified for the final tournament:

Note: The statistics include only the six Beach Soccer Africa Cup of Nations (BSAfCON) tournaments organised by CAF, in line with confederation records, and exclude the six Beach Soccer Worldwide (BSWW) qualifying editions.

Team	Qualified as	Qualified on	Appearances				Previous best performance
Team	Qualified as	Qualified on	Total	First	Last	Streak	Previous best performance
Senegal	Host nation	18 May 2026	7th	2015	2024	7	Champions (2016, 2018, 2021, 2022, 2024)
Malawi	Qualification second round winners	17 October 2026	3rd	2022	2024	3	Sixth place (2022)
Morocco	Qualification second round winners	18 October 2026	7th	2015	2024	7	Third place (2021, 2022, 2024)
Ghana	Qualification second round winners	18 October 2026	4th	2015	2024	2	Seventh place (2015, 2016)
Mauritania	Qualification second round winners	18 October 2026	2nd	2024		2	Runners-up (2024)
Uganda	Qualification second round winners	18 October 2026	3rd	2021	2022	1	Fourth place (2021)
Mozambique	Qualification second round winners	18 October 2026	4th	2021	2024	4	Runners-up (2021)
Angola	Qualification second round winners	18 October 2026	1st	Debut			

=== Draw ===
The draw, which determined the composition of the two groups, was held on 4 November 2026 at 16:00 GMT at the CAF Headquarters in Cairo, Egypt. It was conducted by Ahmed Temsah.

Senegal, as the host nation and defending champions, were assigned position A1, while Mauritania, the runners-up of the previous edition, were placed in position B1. The remaining six teams were divided into three pots based on their rankings across the previous three editions. The draw began with Pot 3, with the first team drawn allocated to position A4 and the second to B4. The same procedure was followed for the remaining pots until all teams had been assigned their respective positions.

Pots

Pot 1	Pot 2	Pot 3
Morocco (20); Mozambique (49)	Malawi (61); Uganda (77)	Ghana (56); Angola (NR)

The numbers in parentheses show the BSWW World Ranking of the teams at the time of the draw. The rankings are displayed for context only and had no influence on the draw.

== Group Stage ==
All times are local, GMT (UTC±0)

=== Group A ===
Pos	Team	Pld	W	W+	WP	L	GF	GA	GD	Pts	Qualification
1	Senegal (H)	0	0	0	0	0	0	0	0	0	Knockout stage
2	Mozambique	0	0	0	0	0	0	0	0	0	Knockout stage
3	Uganda	0	0	0	0	0	0	0	0	0	Fifth place play-off
4	Ghana	0	0	0	0	0	0	0	0	0	Seventh place play-off

First match(es) will be played: 28 November 2026. Source: CAF
(H) Host
28 November 2026
15:00

Mozambique	v	Uganda

28 November 2026
16:30

Senegal	v	Ghana

1 December 2026
13:30

Ghana	v	Mozambique

1 December 2026
16:30

Senegal	v	Uganda

2 December 2026
13:30

Uganda	v	Ghana

2 December 2026
16:30

Senegal	v	Mozambique

=== Group B ===
Pos	Team	Pld	W	W+	WP	L	GF	GA	GD	Pts	Qualification
1	Mauritania	0	0	0	0	0	0	0	0	0	Knockout stage
2	Morocco	0	0	0	0	0	0	0	0	0	Knockout stage
3	Malawi	0	0	0	0	0	0	0	0	0	Fifth place play-off
4	Angola	0	0	0	0	0	0	0	0	0	Seventh place play-off

First match(es) will be played: 29 November 2026. Source: CAF
29 November 2026
15:00

Mauritania	v	Angola

29 November 2026
16:30

Morocco	v	Malawi

1 December 2026
12:00

Angola	v	Morocco

1 December 2026
15:00

Mauritania	v	Malawi

2 December 2026
12:00

Malawi	v	Angola

2 December 2026
15:00

Mauritania	v	Morocco

== Placement matches ==
=== Seventh place play-off ===
4 December 2026
12:00

4A	v	4B

=== Fifth place play-off ===
4 December 2026
13:30

3A	v	3B

== Knockout stage ==
Semi-finals
4 December
4 December

Final
6 December
Third place play-off
6 December

== Qualified teams for FIFA Beach Soccer World Cup ==
The following two teams from CAF will qualify for the 2027 FIFA Beach Soccer World Cup.

Team	Qualified on	Previous appearances in FIFA Beach Soccer World Cup^{1} only FIFA era (since 2005)
	December 2026	
	December 2026	

^{1} Italic indicates hosts for that year.
