= 2024 Beach Soccer Africa Cup of Nations =

2024 Africa Beach Soccer Cup of Nations

Tournament details
- Host country: Egypt
- City: Hurghada
- Dates: 19–26 October
- Teams: 8
- Venue: 1 (in 1 host city)

Final positions
- Champions: Senegal (5th title)
- Runners-up: Mauritania
- Third place: Morocco
- Fourth place: Egypt

Tournament statistics
- Matches played: 18
- Goals scored: 106 (5.89 per match)
- Top scorer(s): (Ghana) Alexander Adjetey (8 goals)

The 2024 Africa Beach Soccer Cup of Nations was the sixth edition of the Africa Beach Soccer Cup of Nations (BSAFCON), the premier beach soccer championship in Africa contested by Confederation of African Football (CAF) member association men's national teams. And the 12th edition of the beach soccer championships on the continent, including the FIFA Beach Soccer World Cup CAF qualifiers championships organized by Beach Soccer Worldwide before its rebranding in 2015.

The tournament was held in Hurghada, Egypt, with all matches taking place from 19 to 26 October 2024. It also serves as the qualification pathway for African teams to the 2025 FIFA Beach Soccer World Cup in Seychelles, with the winner and runner-up qualifying alongside the automatically qualified host team, Seychelles.

Senegal were the defending champions, and successfully defending the title.

== Qualification ==
2024 Africa Beach Soccer Cup of Nations qualification
Tournament details
- Dates: 19 – 28 July
- Teams: 14 (from 1 confederation)

Tournament statistics
- Matches played: 16
- Goals scored: 95 (5.94 per match)

The 2024 Africa Beach Soccer Cup of Nations qualifying round determined the eight teams that competed in the final tournament in October. The draw for the qualifiers took place on June 13, 2024, at the CAF headquarters in Cairo. The matches were held during the weekends of July 19–21 and July 26–28.

Qualification ties were played on a home-and-away, two-legged basis. If the sides were level on aggregate after the second leg, the away goals rule was applied, and if still level, the tie proceeded directly to a penalty shoot-out (no extra time played).

=== Entrants ===
Host Egypt qualified automatically, while the other 14 teams competed against each other to determine the remaining 7 spots.

The BSWW World Ranking was provided in parentheses for context only.

Round	Teams entering round	No. of teams
Qualification	Angola (n/a); Burundi (n/a); Ivory Coast (83rd); Ghana (84th); Guinea (n/a); Morocco (18th); Mauritania (74th); Malawi (63rd); Mozambique (35th); Nigeria (70th); Seychelles (68th); Senegal (10th); Tanzania (47th); Uganda (52nd)	14
Final tournament	Egypt (20th)	1

Withdrawals

Angola and Uganda withdrew before the first legs were played.

=== Results ===
Team 1	Agg.	Team 2	1st leg	2nd leg
Guinea	4–13	Senegal	3–9	1–4
Angola	w/o	Morocco	—	—
Ghana	10–5	Ivory Coast	5–3	5–2
Mauritania	10–10 (a)	Nigeria	4–5	6–5
Tanzania	w/o	Uganda	—	—
Seychelles	4–9	Mozambique	3–7	1–2
Burundi	14–15	Malawi	6–7	8–8

=== Qualified teams ===
The following eight teams have qualified for the final tournament:

Team	Appearance	Previous best performance
Egypt (hosts)	12th	Runners-up (2022)
Ghana	4th	7th place (2015, 2016)
Malawi	2nd	6th place (2016)
Mauritania	1st	Debut
Morocco	10th	3rd place (2013, 2021, 2022)
Mozambique	6th	Runners-up (2021)
Senegal (title holders)	11th	Champions (2008, 2011, 2013, 2016, 2018, 2021, 2022)
Tanzania	3rd	6th place (2021)

== Group Stage ==
The draw took place on 19 September 2024.

All times are local, EGY (UTC+2).

=== Group A ===
Pos	Team	Pld	W	W+	WP	L	GF	GA	GD	Pts	Qualification
1	Egypt (H)	3	3	0	0	0	18	8	+10	9	Knockout stage
2	Morocco	3	2	0	0	1	11	8	+3	6	Knockout stage
3	Ghana	3	1	0	0	2	15	14	+1	3	Fifth place play-off
4	Tanzania	3	0	0	0	3	9	23	−14	0	Seventh place play-off

Source: CAF
(H) Host
19 October 2024
15:00

Morocco	4–3	Tanzania
Zahraoui 4'; El Kraichly 10'; Ghannam 15'; Jabbary 32'	Report (FRMF); Report (CAF)	Juma 1', 8'; Bausi 35'

Albatross Stadium, Hurghada
Referee: Hamdi Bchir (Tunisia)
19 October 2024
16:30

Egypt	6–3	Ghana
Elshafei 10', 25'; Haitham Costa 17', 21'; Hossam Paulo 26'; Elshahat 29'	Report (GFA); Report (CAF)	Adjetey 22', 27', 29'

Albatross Stadium, Hurghada
Referee: Steven Siave (Mauritius)

21 October 2024
12:00

Morocco	5–2	Ghana
Zahraoui 7' (pen.), 18'; Ghannam 13'; Ticor 20' (o.g.); El Bidouri 34'	Report (FRMF); Report (GFA); Report (CAF)	Ticor 16'; Adjetey 25'

Albatross Stadium, Hurghada
Referee: Ivan Kintu (Uganda)
21 October 2024
12:00

Egypt	9–3	Tanzania
Hossam Paulo 12'; Bahgat 14', 24', 32'; Elshafei 17'; Hussein 24', 28', 31'; Ahmed 34'	Report (CAF)	Gambo 15'; Mapunda 35', 35'

Albatross Stadium, Hurghada
Referee: Tsaralaza Maolidy (Madagascar)

22 October 2024
12:00

Tanzania	3–10	Ghana
Juma 13'; Mapunda 20'; Yakoub Nassor 29'	Report (GFA); Report (CAF)	Nyamadi 1', 16'; Adjetey 4', 21', 24', 24'; Nyadedzor 5', 27'; Osai 11'

Albatross Stadium, Hurghada
Referee: Hany Farouk (Egypt)
22 October 2024
15:00

Morocco	2–3	Egypt
Oubahri 11'; El Kraichly 35'	Report (FRMF); Report (CAF)	Mohamed Loha 5', 17'; Ahmed Temsah 32'

Albatross Stadium, Hurghada
Referee: Ramadhani Ndayisaba (Burundi)

=== Group B ===
Pos	Team	Pld	W	W+	WP	L	GF	GA	GD	Pts	Qualification
1	Mauritania	3	2	0	0	1	19	11	+8	6	Knockout stage
2	Senegal	3	2	0	0	1	14	9	+5	6	Knockout stage
3	Mozambique	3	1	0	1	1	10	12	−2	4	Fifth place play-off
4	Malawi	3	0	0	0	3	10	21	−11	0	Seventh place play-off

Source: CAF
20 October 2024
15:00

Senegal	2–5	Mauritania
Man. Diagne 13'; Mam. Diagne 35'	Report (FSF); Report (CAF)	El Id 1'; Diallo 23'; Malick 29'; Diop 34'; Salem 35'

Albatross Stadium, Hurghada
Referee: Ahmed Nofal (Egypt)
20 October 2024
16:30

Mozambique	4–3	Malawi
Rachide 10', 14', 36'; Figo 22'	Report (FMF); Report (CAF)	Ussi 13', 14'; Kajam 20'

Albatross Stadium, Hurghada
Referee: Driss Lamghaidar (Morocco)

21 October 2024
13:30

Senegal	6–1	Malawi
Man. Diagne 4'; Gadiaga 14', 20', 24'; Thiaw 24', 25'	Report (FSF); Report (CAF)	Dala 31'

Albatross Stadium, Hurghada
Referee: Omar Tiguili (Morocco)
21 October 2024
16:30

Mozambique	3–3 (a.e.t.)	Mauritania
Ângelo 11'; Nelson 28'; Rachide 31'	Report (FMF)	Belkheir 1', 30'; Malick 9'
Penalties
Nelson (penalty scored); Rachide (penalty scored); Mabomo (penalty scored); Yuran (penalty scored)	4–1	(penalty missed) Malick; (penalty missed) Thierno; (penalty scored) Limam

Albatross Stadium, Hurghada
Referee: Jackson Steven Msilombo (Tanzania)

22 October 2024
13:30

Malawi	6–11	Mauritania
Dala 9'; Kajam 10'; Ussi 10', 23', 28', 30'		El Id 4'; Belkheir 7', 15', 19', 25', 27'; Ely 14', 15'; Malick 18', 33', 36'

Albatross Stadium, Hurghada
Referee: Hamdi Bchir (Tunisia)
22 October 2024
16:30

Mozambique	3–6	Senegal
Rachide 4' (pen.); Nelson 7'; Figo 26'		Diatta 2', 26'; Man. Diagne 3' (pen.); Gadiaga 5', 16', 29'

Albatross Stadium, Hurghada
Referee: Steven Siave (Mauritius)

== 7th place play-off ==
The teams finishing in fourth place in the groups are knocked out of title-winning contention, receding to play in a consolation match to determine 7th and 8th place in the final standings.

Seventh place play-off
24 October 2024
Tanzania	5
Malawi (a.e.t.)	6

24 October 2024
12:00

Tanzania	5–6 (a.e.t.)	Malawi
Juma 9' (pen.), 17', 32', 36'; Bausi 16'		Kajam 6', 7', 36', 38'; Ussi 17', 23'

Albatross Stadium, Hurghada
Referee: Ahmed Nofal (Egypt)

== 5th place play-off ==
The teams finishing in third place in the groups are knocked out of title-winning contention, receding to play in a consolation match to determine 5th and 6th place in the final standings.

Fifth place play-off
24 October 2024
Ghana	5
Mozambique	3

24 October 2024
13:00

Ghana	5–3	Mozambique
Nyamadi 5'; Adjetey 17', 26', 36'; Osai 21'		Rachide 21'; Paulo 26'; Ângelo 31'

Albatross Stadium, Hurghada
Referee: Aly Deme (Senegal)

== Knockout stage ==
The group winners and runners-up progress to the knockout stage to continue to compete for the title.

Semi-finals
24 October
Egypt	1
Senegal	2
24 October
Mauritania	7
Morocco	4

Final
26 October
Senegal	6
Mauritania	1
Third place play-off
26 October
Egypt	3
Morocco	4

=== Semi-finals ===
Winners qualify for the 2025 FIFA Beach Soccer World Cup.

24 October 2024
15:00

Egypt	1–2	Senegal
Hossam Paulo 16' (pen.)		Man. Diagne 1'; Diatta 9'

Albatross Stadium, Hurghada
Referee: Steven Siave (Mauritius)
24 October 2024
16:30

Mauritania	7–4	Morocco
Ely 5', 21', 31'; Diallo 6'; El Id 16'; Malick 18'; Bilal 35'		Ghannam 2'; Zahraoui 5', 15'; El Kraichly 17'

Albatross Stadium, Hurghada
Referee: Tsaralaza Maolidy (Madagascar)

=== Third place play-off ===
26 October 2024
14:00

Egypt	3–4	Morocco

Albatross Stadium, Hurghada

=== Final ===
26 October 2024
15:30

Senegal	6–1	Mauritania

Albatross Stadium, Hurghada

== Goalscorers ==
There have been 106 goals scored in 12 matches, for an average of 8.83 goals per match (as of 22 October 2024).

8 goals

- (Ghana) Alexander Adjetey

7 goals

- (Mauritania) Cheick Belkheir

6 goals

- (Malawi) Sandram Ussi
- (Senegal) Seydina Laye Gadiaga

5 goals

- (Mauritania) Bidjati Malick
- (Mozambique) Rachide

3 goals

- (Egypt) Ismaeel Bahgat
- (Egypt) Abdoo Elshafei
- (Egypt) Hassan Hussein
- (Egypt) Mohamed Loha
- (Morocco) Reda Zahraoui
- (Senegal) Mandione Diagne
- (Tanzania) Jaruph Juma
- (Tanzania) Stephano Mapunda

2 goals

- (Egypt) Haitham Costa
- (Egypt) Hossam Paulo
- (Ghana) Robert Nyadedzor
- (Ghana) Wise Nyamadi
- (Malawi) Dala Simba Dala
- (Malawi) Isaac Kajam
- (Mauritania) El Bechir El Id
- (Mauritania) Mohamedou Ely
- (Morocco) Badr El Kraichly
- (Morocco) Driss Ghannam
- (Mozambique) Figo
- (Mozambique) Nelson
- (Senegal) Ninou Diatta
- (Senegal) Sanou Laye Thiaw

1 goal

- (Egypt) Mostafa Ahmed
- (Egypt) Ahmed Elshahat
- (Egypt) Ahmed Temsah
- (Ghana) Richard Martei Osai
- (Ghana) Kini Ticor
- (Mauritania) Mohamed Diallo
- (Mauritania) Abd El Azize Diop
- (Mauritania) Hamdi Salem
- (Morocco) Amine El Bidouri
- (Morocco) Zouhair Jabbary
- (Morocco) Adnan Oubahri
- (Mozambique) Ângelo
- (Senegal) Mamour Diagne
- (Tanzania) Abdulrahim Bausi
- (Tanzania) Ismail Gambo
- (Tanzania) Yakoub Nassor

1 own goal

- (Ghana) Kini Ticor (against Morocco)

== Final standings ==
Qualified for the 2025 FIFA Beach Soccer World Cup

Rank	Team
1st place, gold medalist(s)	Senegal
2nd place, silver medalist(s)	Mauritania
3rd place, bronze medalist(s)	Morocco
4th	Egypt
5th	Ghana
6th	Mozambique
7th	Malawi
8th	Tanzania

== Qualified teams for FIFA Beach Soccer World Cup ==
The following two teams from CAF qualify for the 2025 FIFA Beach Soccer World Cup alongside Seychelles who automatically qualified as host.

Team	Qualified on	Previous appearances in FIFA Beach Soccer World Cup^{1} only FIFA era (since 2005)
Seychelles	16 December 2022	0 (Debut)
Senegal	24 October 2024	9 (2007, 2008, 2011, 2013, 2015, 2017, 2019, 2021, 2024)
Mauritania	24 October 2024	0 (Debut)

^{1} Bold indicates champions for that year. Italic indicates hosts for that year.
