= 2022 Beach Soccer Africa Cup of Nations =

2022 Africa Beach Soccer Cup of Nations
2023 FIFA Beach Soccer World Cup CAF qualifier

Tournament details
- Host country: Mozambique
- City: Vilankulo
- Dates: 21–28 October
- Teams: 8 (from 1 confederation)
- Venue: 1 (in 1 host city)

Final positions
- Champions: Senegal (4th title)
- Runners-up: Egypt
- Third place: Morocco
- Fourth place: Mozambique

Tournament statistics
- Matches played: 14
- Goals scored: 118 (8.43 per match)
- Top scorer: (Senegal) Mandione Diagne (10 goals)
- Best player: (Senegal) Mandione Diagne
- Best goalkeeper: (Senegal) Al Seyni Ndiaye

The 2022 Africa Beach Soccer Cup of Nations was the fifth edition of the Africa Beach Soccer Cup of Nations (BSAFCON), the premier beach soccer championship in Africa contested by men's national teams who are members of the Confederation of African Football (CAF). The championship was originally organised by Beach Soccer Worldwide (BSWW) under the title of FIFA Beach Soccer World Cup CAF qualifier (also informally known as the CAF Beach Soccer Championship). In 2015, CAF became its organisers and began using the BSAFCON title to which the competition was officially renamed the next year. Therefore, this was the 11th edition of the event overall.

The tournament takes place in Mozambique, which was confirmed as the host nation on 16 May 2021; the city of Vilankulo stages all matches between 21 and 28 October 2022. It is happening in only the next calendar year after the previous edition because said edition was postponed due to the effects of the COVID-19 pandemic in Africa.

The tournament also acted as the qualification route for African teams to the 2023 FIFA Beach Soccer World Cup in the United Arab Emirates; with the winners and runners-up qualifying.

Senegal were the defending champions and successfully defended the title after defeating Egypt in the final to secure their 7th title.

== Qualification ==
2022 Africa Beach Soccer Cup of Nations qualification
Tournament details
- Dates: 22 July – 7 August
- Teams: 14 (from 1 confederation)

Tournament statistics
- Matches played: 11
- Goals scored: 101 (9.18 per match)

The 2022 Africa Beach Soccer Cup of Nations qualifying round determined the eight teams that will compete in the final tournament in October.

The fixtures were announced by CAF on 24 June 2022. The matches were played on the weekends of 22–24 July and 5–7 August.

Qualification ties were played on a home-and-away, two-legged basis. If the sides were level on aggregate after the second leg, the away goals rule was applied, and if still level, the tie proceeded directly to a penalty shoot-out (no extra time played).

=== Entrants ===
Fourteen teams entered qualifying. The seven winners of the ties qualified for the final tournament, joining one automatic qualifier – the hosts, Mozambique.

Round	Teams entering round	No. of teams
Qualification	Cameroon (n/a); Comoros (18th); Egypt (4th); Ghana (n/a); Ivory Coast (13th); Libya (9th); Madagascar (11th); Malawi (19th); Morocco (2nd); Nigeria (6th); Senegal (1st); Seychelles (8th); Tanzania (7th); Uganda (5th)	14
Final tournament	Mozambique (3rd)	1

Note: The numbers in parentheses show the African ranking of the teams at the time of the qualification round (out of 19 nations).

=== Matches ===
Libya withdrew before the first legs were played.

Ivory Coast refused to continue their second leg match in protest of a penalty awarded to Morocco in the final moments of the game, and thus the match was abandoned with the score at 3–3. The outcome was referred to CAF. On 19 August, CAF announced their decision in applying Articles 54 and 56 of Chapter 30 (Withdrawals, Refusal to Play, Replacement) of the tournament regulations, thereby awarding Morocco with a 3–0 walkover victory in the second leg.

Team 1	Agg.	Team 2	1st leg	2nd leg
Seychelles	4–11	Madagascar	2–5	2–6
Comoros	5–9	Uganda	2–5	3–4
Malawi	8–8 (a)	Tanzania	3–2	5–6
Libya	w/o	Nigeria	—	—
Ivory Coast	7–9	Morocco	7–6	aba., 0–3 w/o
Cameroon	4–16	Senegal	1–9	3–7
Ghana	11–12	Egypt	6–5	5–7

=== Qualified teams ===
The following eight teams have qualified for the final tournament:

Team	Appearance	Previous best performance
Egypt	11th	3rd place (2006, 2011, 2016, 2018)
Madagascar	6th	Champions (2015)
Malawi	1st	Debut
Mozambique (hosts)	5th	Runners-up (2021)
Senegal (title holders)	10th	Champions (2008, 2011, 2013, 2016, 2018, 2021)
Uganda	2nd	4th place (2021)
Morocco	9th	3rd place (2013, 2021)

== Group stage ==
=== Group A ===
Pos	Team	Pld	W	W+	WP	L	GF	GA	GD	Pts	Qualification
1	Morocco	2	2	0	0	0	10	4	+6	6	Knockout stage
2	Mozambique (H)	2	1	0	0	1	5	5	0	3	Knockout stage
3	Malawi	2	0	0	0	2	5	11	−6	0	Fifth place play-off
4	Nigeria	0	0	0	0	0	0	0	0	0	Withdrew

Source: CAF
(H) Host
21 October 2022
15:30

Mozambique	4–2	Malawi
Manuel 11', 31'; Arroz 21'; Big Ro 26'	Report	Dala 9'; Ussi 15'

Vilankulo Arena, Vilankulo
Referee: Hamdi Bchir (Tunisia)

23 October 2022
15:30

Morocco	3–1	Mozambique
Yassine 15'; Frindi 24'; Jabbary 28'	Report	Dez 10' (pen.)

Vilankulo Arena, Vilankulo
Referee: Hany Farouk (Egypt)

24 October 2022
12:30

Malawi	3–7	Morocco
Ussi 17', 30'; Dala 21'	Report	Frindi 1', 20'; El Ouariry 5'; Ghailani 9'; Abagli 17', 36'; Khabaz 32'

Vilankulo Arena, Vilankulo
Referee: Jelili Ogunmuyiwa (Nigeria)

=== Group B ===
Pos	Team	Pld	W	W+	WP	L	GF	GA	GD	Pts	Qualification
1	Senegal	3	3	0	0	0	24	9	+15	9	Knockout stage
2	Egypt	3	1	0	1	1	14	12	+2	4	Knockout stage
3	Uganda	3	1	0	0	2	9	19	−10	3	Fifth place play-off
4	Madagascar	3	0	0	0	3	11	18	−7	0	

Source: CAF
22 October 2022
14:00

Senegal	10–1	Uganda
Sylla 3'; Md. Diagne 7', 24', 25', 26', 35'; Mendy 8', 8'; Samb 30'; Sene 31'	Report	Lukooya 25'

Vilankulo Arena, Vilankulo
Referee: Reetesh Loll (Mauritius)
22 October 2022
15:30

Madagascar	4–4 (a.e.t.)	Egypt
Richard 11'; Randriama 28', 34'; Rakotomalala 36' (pen.)	Report	Hussein 1'; Paulo 9'; El-Shahat 26'; El-Shafei 31'
Penalties
Razafimamdimby (penalty missed); Enidiel (penalty scored); Jinidy (penalty scored); Richard (penalty missed); Randriamampandry (penalty scored)	3–4	(penalty scored) Samir; (penalty scored) Paulo; (penalty scored) Costa; (penalty missed) Hussein; (penalty scored) M. Ahmed

Vilankulo Arena, Vilankulo
Referee: Steven Msilombo (Tanzania)

23 October 2022
12:30

Uganda	6–3	Madagascar
Nkuubi 20', 25', 25', 32'; Lubwama 24'; Kawawulo 26'	Report	Raharison 7'; Razafimandimby 20'; Alexandre 23'

Vilankulo Arena, Vilankulo
Referee: Dominique Toppe (Ivory Coast)
23 October 2022
14:00

Egypt	4–6	Senegal
Loha 10'; Paulo 15'; Costa 17', 21' (pen.)	Report	Ndiaye 4'; Md. Diagne 16', 18'; Diatta 22'; Mm. Diagne 27'; Sene 33'

Vilankulo Arena, Vilankulo
Referee: Hamdi Bchir (Tunisia)

24 October 2022
14:00

Uganda	2–6	Egypt
Lukooya 9' (pen.); Nkuubi 35'	Report	M. Ahmed 8', 30'; Paulo 15', 25'; Hussein 18'; Bahgat 35'

Vilankulo Arena, Vilankulo
Referee: Louis Siave (Mauritius)
24 October 2022
15:30

Senegal	8–4	Madagascar
Md. Diagne 7', 14'; Mm. Diagne 19' (pen.), 20', 21'; Coly 9'; S. Ndoye 13'; Sene 30'	Report	Razafimandimby 14'; Richard 14'; Rakotomalala 27'; Jindy 29'

Vilankulo Arena, Vilankulo
Referee: Ramadhani Ndayisaba (Burundi)

== 5th place play-off ==
The teams finishing in third place in the groups are knocked out of title-winning contention, receding to play in a consolation match to determine 5th and 6th place in the final standings.

Fifth place play-off
26 October 2022
Malawi	6 (1)
Uganda (p)	6 (4)

26 October 2022
12:30

Malawi	6–6 (a.e.t.)	Uganda
Dala 8'; Frazer 11'; Mphande 15'; Ussi 17', 38'; Nkhulumba 20'	Report	Nkuubi 17', 36', 39'; Lukooya 22' (pen.); Opuuli 23'; Lubwama 25'
Penalties
Kajamu (penalty scored); Biliati (penalty missed); Nkhulumba (penalty missed)	1–4	(penalty scored) Lule; (penalty scored) Lubwama; (penalty scored) Opuuli; (penalty scored) Kigozi

Vilankulo Arena, Vilankulo
Referee: Aly Deme (Senegal)

== Knockout stage ==
The group winners and runners-up progress to the knockout stage to continue to compete for the title.

Semi-finals
26 October
Morocco	4
Egypt	5
26 October
Senegal	3
Mozambique	2

Final
28 October
Egypt	2 (5)
Senegal	2 (6)
Third place play-off
28 October
Morocco	6
Mozambique	4

=== Semi-finals ===
Winners qualify for the 2023 FIFA Beach Soccer World Cup.

26 October 2022
14:30

Morocco	4–5	Egypt
Frindi 4', 4', 26', 27' (pen.)	Report	Paulo 13', 24'; Bahgat 22', 32'; El-Shahat 34'

Vilankulo Arena, Vilankulo
Referee: Reetesh Loll (Mauritius)
26 October 2022
15:30

Senegal	3–2	Mozambique
Sene 21'; Fall 24'; Sylla 29'	Report	Manuel 10', 21'

Vilankulo Arena, Vilankulo
Referee: Jelili Ogunmuyiwa (Nigeria)

=== Third place play-off ===
28 October 2022
14:00

Morocco	6–4	Mozambique
Jabbary 11'; El Khdym 14'; El Hamidy 19'; Big Ro 20' (o.g.); Frindi 21'; Aboutalbi 35'	Report	Monstro 6'; Arroz 6'; Abagli 15' (o.g.); Manuel 25'

Vilankulo Arena, Vilankulo
Referee: Ivan Kintu (Uganda)

=== Final ===
28 October 2022
15:30

Egypt	2–2 (a.e.t.)	Senegal
Hussein 27'; Diatta 27' (o.g.)	Report	Md. Diagne 7'; Mendy 32'
Penalties
Samir (penalty scored); Paulo (penalty scored); Costa (penalty scored); Sasa (penalty scored); E. Ahmed (penalty scored); Loha (penalty missed)	5–6	(penalty scored) Sylla; (penalty scored) Fall; (penalty scored) Md. Diagne; (penalty scored) Mm. Diagne; (penalty scored) Mendy; (penalty scored) Diatta

Vilankulo Arena, Vilankulo
Referee: Jelili Ogunmuyiwa (Nigeria)

== Awards ==
Best player
(Senegal) Mandione Diagne
Top scorer
(Senegal) Mandione Diagne
10 goals
Best goalkeeper
(Senegal) Al Seyni Ndiaye

== Goalscorers ==
There were 118 goals scored in 14 matches, for an average of 8.43 goals per match.

10 goals

- (Senegal) Mandione Diagne

8 goals

- (Morocco) Anouar Frindi
- (Uganda) Brian Nkuubi

6 goals

- (Egypt) Paulo

5 goals

- (Mozambique) Nelson Manuel
- (Malawi) Sandram Ussi

4 goals

- (Senegal) Mamour Diagne
- (Senegal) Seydina Sene

3 goals

- (Egypt) Ismael Bahgat
- (Egypt) Hassan Hussein
- (Malawi) Simba Dala
- (Senegal) Raoul Mendy

2 goals

- (Egypt) Moustafa Ahmed
- (Egypt) Costa
- (Egypt) Ahmed El-Shahat
- (Madagascar) Orlando Rakotomalala
- (Madagascar) Tokindrainy Randriama
- (Madagascar) Ymelda Razafimandimby
- (Madagascar) Marcel Richard
- (Morocco) Ibrahim Abagli
- (Morocco) Zouhair Jabbary
- (Mozambique) Arroz
- (Senegal) Mamadou Sylla
- (Uganda) Joshua Lubwama
- (Uganda) Baker Lukooya

1 goal

- (Egypt) Loha
- (Egypt) Abdelrahiman El-Shafei
- (Madagascar) Fofo Alexandre
- (Madagascar) Joel Jindy
- (Madagascar) Jacques Raharison
- (Morocco) Rabi Aboutalbi
- (Morocco) Mohamed Ghailani
- (Morocco) Azzedine El Hamidy
- (Morocco) Mohamed Khabaz
- (Morocco) Ali El Khdym
- (Morocco) Ismail El Ouariry
- (Morocco) Kamal Yassine
- (Mozambique) Big Ro
- (Mozambique) Dez
- (Mozambique) Monstro
- (Malawi) Watson Frazer
- (Malawi) Ganizani Mphande
- (Malawi) O'Brien Nkhulumba
- (Senegal) Souley Coly
- (Senegal) Ninou Diatta
- (Senegal) Babacar Fall
- (Senegal) Al Seyni Ndiaye
- (Senegal) Saliou Ndoye
- (Senegal) Amar Samb
- (Uganda) Isma Kawawulo
- (Uganda) Sharifu Opuuli

1 own goal

- (Morocco) Ibrahim Abagli (against Mozambique)
- (Mozambique) Big Ro (against Morocco)
- (Senegal) Ninou Diatta (against Egypt)

== Final standings ==
Qualified for the 2023 FIFA Beach Soccer World Cup

Rank	Team
1st place, gold medalist(s)	Senegal
2nd place, silver medalist(s)	Egypt
3rd place, bronze medalist(s)	Morocco
4th	Mozambique
5th	Uganda
6th	Malawi
7th	Madagascar

== Qualified teams for FIFA Beach Soccer World Cup ==
The following two teams from CAF qualify for the 2023 FIFA Beach Soccer World Cup.

Team	Qualified on	Previous appearances in FIFA Beach Soccer World Cup^{1} only FIFA era (since 2005)
Senegal	26 October 2022	8 (2007, 2008, 2011, 2013, 2015, 2017, 2019, 2021)
Egypt	26 October 2022	0 (Debut)

^{1} Bold indicates champions for that year. Italic indicates hosts for that year.
