= Tunisia national beach soccer team =

Men's national team

Tunisia
- Nickname(s): نسور قرطاج (Eagles of Carthage)
- Association: Tunisian Football Federation
- Other affiliation: UAFA (Arab World)
- Confederation: CAF (Africa)
- Sub-confederation: UNAF (North Africa)
- FIFA code: TUN
- BSWW ranking: NR (2 September 2026)
First colours
Second colours
Third colours

The Tunisia national beach soccer team has represented Tunisia in men's international beach soccer competitions. The team is administered by the Tunisian Football Federation (TFF), which governs football in Tunisia. On a continental level, the team competes under the Confederation of African Football (CAF), which governs associate football in Africa, and is also affiliated with FIFA for global competitions. Additionally, the team is a member of the Union of North African Football (UNAF) and the Union of Arab Football Associations (UAFA). The team is colloquially known as Eagles of Carthage by fans and the media, with the bald eagle serving as its symbol. Their home kit is primarily white and their away kit is red, which is a reference to the national flag of the country.

Tunisia has never qualified for the FIFA Beach Soccer World Cup or Beach Soccer Africa Cup of Nations. Currently there is no beach soccer activity in Tunisia and the team is not ranked in the BSWW World Ranking.

== Competitive Records ==
Champions Runners-up Third place Fourth place

- Red border color indicates tournament was held on home soil.

=== FIFA Beach Soccer World Cup ===
FIFA Beach Soccer World Cup record
Year	Round	Position	Pld	W	D*	L	GF	GA
(Brazil) 2005	Did not enter							
(Brazil) 2006	Did not enter							
(Brazil) 2007	Did not enter							
(France) 2008	Did not enter							
(United Arab Emirates) 2009	Did not enter							
(Italy) 2011	Did not enter							
(French Polynesia) 2013	Did not enter							
(Portugal) 2015	Did not enter							
(The Bahamas) 2017	Did not enter							
(Paraguay) 2019	Did not enter							
(Russia) 2021	Did not enter							
(United Arab Emirates) 2024	Did not enter							
(Seychelles) 2025	Did not enter							
Total	–	0/13	–	–	–	–	–	–

=== Beach Soccer Africa Cup of Nations ===
Beach Soccer Africa Cup of Nations record
Year	Round	Position	Pld	W	D*	L	GF	GA
(South Africa) 2006	Did not enter							
(South Africa) 2007	Did not enter							
(South Africa) 2008	Did not enter							
(South Africa) 2009	Did not enter							
(Morocco) 2011	Did not enter							
(Morocco) 2013	Did not enter							
(Seychelles) 2015	Withdrew							
(Nigeria) 2016	Did not enter							
(Egypt) 2018	Did not enter							
(Senegal) 2021	Did not enter							
(Mozambique) 2022	Did not enter							
(Egypt) 2024	Did not enter							
Total	–	0/12	–	–	–	–	–	–

=== Arab Beach Soccer Cup ===
Arab Beach Soccer Cup record
Year	Round	Position	Pld	W	D*	L	GF	GA
(Egypt) 2008	Did not enter							
(Saudi Arabia) 2010	Did not enter							
(Egypt) 2014	Did not enter							
(Saudi Arabia) 2023	Did not enter							
(Egypt) 2026	Did not enter							
Total	–	0/5	–	–	–	–	–	–
