= Libya national beach soccer team =

National beach soccer team

Libya
- Nickname: Mediterranean Knights
- Association: Libyan Football Federation
- Confederation: Confederation of African Football
- FIFA code: LBA
- BSWW ranking: 72 ▼1 (1 June 2026)
First colours
Second colours

First international
- United Arab Emirates 6–4 Libya (Marsa Alam, Egypt; 1 July 2008)

Biggest win
- Libya 14–3 Albania (Pescara, Italy; 4 September 2015)

Biggest defeat
- Senegal 10–1 Libya (Sharm El Sheikh, Egypt; 11 December 2018); Italy 12–3 Libya (Patras, Greece; 28 August 2019)

Beach Soccer Africa Cup of Nations
- Appearances: 2 (first in 2016)
- Best result: Eighth Place (2016, 2018)

Arab Beach Soccer Championship
- Appearances: 3 (first in 2008)
- Best result: (gold) Champions (2008)

Mediterranean Beach Games
- Appearances: 2 (first in 2015)
- Best result: (bronze) Bronze medal (2015)

The Libya national beach soccer team (Arabic: المنتخب الليبي لكرة القدم الشاطئية) represents Libya in men's international beach soccer competitions and is controlled by the Libyan Football Federation (LFF).

== History ==
Following the success of the futsal team in 2008, Libya formed a beach soccer team to compete in the inaugural Arab Beach Soccer Championship in July 2008. Despite being assembled only shortly before the tournament, Libya recovered from a 6–4 defeat to the United Arab Emirates in the group stage to reach the final, where it defeated the same opponents 5–3 to become the inaugural champions.

In July 2009, the team made its debut in the African qualifiers for the 2009 FIFA Beach Soccer World Cup. Despite remaining unbeaten in regulation and extra time, Libya were eliminated after losing two matches on penalties, against Senegal and Mozambique.

In September 2015, during the inaugural Mediterranean Beach Games libya clinched the bronze medal after defeating Morocco 4–3 on the bronze medal match.

In their fifth appearance at the continental tournament, Libya secured their first win at the 2018 Beach Soccer Africa Cup of Nations with a 5–2 victory over Tanzania, but lost their remaining matches.

== Competitive record ==
=== FIFA Beach Soccer World Cup ===
FIFA Beach Soccer World Cup record
Year	Result	Pld	W	W+	WP	L	GF	GA
(Brazil) 2005	Did not get invited							
(Brazil) 2006	Did not enter							
(Brazil) 2007	Did not enter							
(France) 2008	Did not enter							
(United Arab Emirates) 2009	Did not qualify							
(Italy) 2011	Did not qualify							
(French Polynesia) 2013	Did not qualify							
(Portugal) 2015	withdrew							
(The Bahamas) 2017	Did not qualify							
(Paraguay) 2019	Did not qualify							
(Russia) 2021	withdrew							
(United Arab Emirates) 2024	withdrew							
(Seychelles) 2025	Did not enter							
Total	—	0/11	—	—	—	—	—	—

=== Beach Soccer Africa Cup of Nations ===
Beach Soccer Africa Cup of Nations record
Year	Result	Pld	W	W+	WP	L	GF	GA
(South Africa) 2006	Did not enter							
(South Africa) 2007	Did not enter							
(South Africa) 2008	Did not enter							
(South Africa) 2009	Group stage	2	0	0	0	2	13	13
(Morocco) 2011	Eighth place	3	0	0	0	3	12	17
(Morocco) 2013	Group stage	3	0	0	0	3	11	21
(Seychelles) 2015	Withdrew							
(Nigeria) 2016	Eighth place (Note: Libya played their group stage matches but withdrew from both placement matches, resulting in an eighth-place finish.)	3	0	0	0	3	10	28
(Egypt) 2018	Eighth place	5	1	0	0	4	17	30
(Senegal) 2021	Withdrew							
(Mozambique) 2022	Withdrew							
(Egypt) 2024	Did not enter							
(Senegal) 2026	To be determined							
Total	5/12	16	1	0	0	15	63	109

=== Arab Beach Soccer Cup ===
Arab Beach Soccer Cup record
Year	Result	Pld	W	W+	WP	L	GF	GA
(Egypt) 2008	Champions	5	3	0	1	1	22	21
(Saudi Arabia) 2010	Group stage	4	1	0	1	2	18	19
(Egypt) 2014	Did not enter							
(Saudi Arabia) 2023	Quarter-finals	4	2	0	0	2	13	17
(Mauritania) 2027	To be determined							
(Mauritania) 2029	To be determined							
Total	3/4	8	3	0	1	4	31	36

=== Mediterranean Beach Games ===
Mediterranean Beach Games record
Year	Result	Pld	W	W+	WP	L	GF	GA
(Italy) 2015	(bronze) Third place	5	3	0	0	2	28	15
(Greece) 2019	Sixth place	4	1	0	0	3	26	29
(Greece) 2023	Did not enter							
(Portugal) 2027	To be determined							
Total	2/3	9	4	0	0	5	54	44

=== African Beach Games ===
African Beach Games record
Year	Result	Pld	W	W+	WP	L	GF	GA
(Cape Verde) 2019	Did not enter							
(Tunisia) 2023	Fifth place	4	0	0	0	4	21	44
Total	1/2	4	0	0	0	4	21	44
