= 2021 Beach Soccer Africa Cup of Nations =

2021 Africa Beach Soccer Cup of Nations
2021 FIFA Beach Soccer World Cup CAF qualifier

Tournament details
- Host country: Senegal
- City: Saly
- Dates: 23–29 May
- Teams: 7 (from 1 confederation)
- Venue: 1 (in 1 host city)

Final positions
- Champions: Senegal (3rd title)
- Runners-up: Mozambique
- Third place: Morocco
- Fourth place: Uganda

Tournament statistics
- Matches played: 14
- Goals scored: 102 (7.29 per match)
- Top scorer: (Mozambique) Nelson Manuel (10 goals)
- Best player: (Mozambique) Nelson Manuel
- Best goalkeeper: (Senegal) Al Seyni Ndiaye

The 2021 Africa Beach Soccer Cup of Nations was the fourth edition of the Africa Beach Soccer Cup of Nations (BSAFCON), the premier beach soccer championship in Africa contested by men's national teams who are members of the Confederation of African Football (CAF). Originally organised by Beach Soccer Worldwide (BSWW) under the title FIFA Beach Soccer World Cup CAF qualifier (informally known as CAF Beach Soccer Championship), in 2015, CAF became organisers and began using the BSAFCON title to which the competition was officially renamed the next year. Overall, this was the 10th edition of the event.

The tournament was due to take place in Jinja, Uganda between 23 and 29 November 2020. However, due to the COVID-19 pandemic and rising water levels on the shores of Lake Victoria affecting the host beach, Uganda withdrew from hosting. Senegal were subsequently chosen as the new hosts, with the tournament rescheduled to take place from 23 to 29 May 2021, in the city of Saly.

The event also acted as the qualification route for African teams to the 2021 FIFA Beach Soccer World Cup in Russia; the winners and runners-up qualified.

Senegal were the defending champions and successfully defended the title, after defeating Mozambique 4–1 in the final to secure their 6th title.

== Qualification ==
2021 Africa Beach Soccer Cup of Nations qualification
Tournament details
- Dates: 26 March – 10 April 2021
- Teams: 12 (from 1 confederation)

Tournament statistics
- Matches played: 4
- Goals scored: 46 (11.5 per match)

The 2021 Africa Beach Soccer Cup of Nations qualifying round determined the eight teams that would compete in the final tournament in May 2021.

The fixtures were announced by CAF on 4 March 2021. The matches were to be played on the weekends of 26–27 March and 9–10 April 2021. However, the COVID-19 pandemic caused a number of withdrawals.

Qualification ties were played on a home-and-away, two-legged basis. If the sides were level on aggregate after the second leg, the away goals rule was applied, and if still level, the tie proceeded directly to a penalty shoot-out (no extra time played).

=== Entrants ===
Fourteen teams entered the competition. The qualifying matches involved the lowest-ranked twelve entrants. The six winners of the ties qualified for the final tournament, joining two automatic qualifiers – Senegal, the hosts, and Egypt, the highest-ranked entrant based on the results of the previous edition.

Nigeria, who had previously competed at every edition of the tournament and qualified for the World Cup from the last two championships, were unable to enter this year's tournament because the Nigeria Football Federation (NFF) had indefinitely barred the national team from competing following the team's "poor outing" at the 2019 World Cup.

Round	Teams entering round	No. of teams
Qualification	Burundi (=22nd); Comoros (n/a); DR Congo (n/a); Ghana (=22nd); Ivory Coast (10th); Libya (7th); Madagascar (8th); Morocco (2nd); Mozambique (15th); Seychelles (16th); Tanzania (9th); Uganda (13th)	12
Final tournament	Egypt (3rd); Senegal (1st)	2

Note: The numbers in parentheses show the African ranking of the teams at the time of the qualification round (out of 23 nations).

=== Matches ===
Team 1	Agg.	Team 2	1st leg	2nd leg
Libya	w/o	Morocco	—	—
Seychelles	w/o	Madagascar	—	—
Comoros	8–17	Mozambique	5–7	3–10
Burundi	9–12	Tanzania	3–8	6–4
Uganda	w/o	Ghana	—	—
DR Congo	w/o	Ivory Coast	—	—

=== Qualified teams ===
The following eight teams qualified for the final tournament:

Team	Appearance	Previous best performance
DR Congo	1st	Debut
Egypt	10th	3rd place (2006, 2011, 2016, 2018)
Morocco	8th	3rd place (2013)
Mozambique	4th	6th place (2009)
Senegal (hosts; title holders)	9th	Champions (2008, 2011, 2013, 2016, 2018)
Seychelles	2nd	8th place (2015)
Tanzania	2nd	7th place (2018)
Uganda	1st	Debut

== Draw ==
The draw to split the eight teams into two groups of four took place at 12:00 EGY (UTC+2) on 29 April 2021 in Cairo, Egypt. It was conducted by CAF Head of Competitions, Khaled Nasser.

Initially, two teams were seeded and assigned to the head of the groups: to Group A, as the hosts, Senegal, and to Group B, as team ranked highest in the previous edition of the championship, Egypt. The other six teams were placed in a single pot. As each was drawn out, the placement of the teams alternated back and forth between Groups A and B.

== Venue ==
Location of Saly in Senegal

One venue was used to host all matches in the city of Saly. The stadium was purpose-built; it was scheduled to be constructed between 11 and 17 May. It had a capacity of 1000, however, 500 was the maximum capacity in order to accommodate social distancing measures regarding the COVID-19 pandemic.

== Squads ==
Each squad contained up to 15 players.

== Group stage ==
The match schedule was originally released on 8 May. The programme was revised on 20 May.

Each team earns three points for a win in regulation time, two points for a win in extra time, one point for a win in a penalty shoot-out, and no points for a defeat. The top two teams from each group advance to the semi-finals.

All times are local, GMT (UTC±0).

=== Group A ===
Pos	Team	Pld	W	W+	WP	L	GF	GA	GD	Pts	Qualification
1	Senegal (H)	2	2	0	0	0	8	2	+6	6	Knockout stage
2	Uganda	2	1	0	0	1	5	8	−3	3	Knockout stage
3	Tanzania	2	0	0	0	2	4	7	−3	0	5th place play-off
4	DR Congo (Note: DR Congo's withdrawal was announced on 20 May; the reasons for which were undisclosed.)	0	0	0	0	0	0	0	0	0	Withdrew

Source: CAF
(H) Host
Notes:
23 May 2021
17:30

Senegal	Cancelled	DR Congo

23 May 2021
17:30

Uganda	1–5	Senegal
Kawawulo	Report	Fall; Mendy; Diatta

24 May 2021
16:15

Tanzania	3–4	Uganda
Jaruph; Stephano	Report	Kawakulo; Byaruhanga; Wasswa

25 May 2021
15:00

DR Congo	Cancelled	Tanzania

26 May 2021
16:15

DR Congo	Cancelled	Uganda

26 May 2021
17:30

Senegal	3–1	Tanzania
Sylla; Fall	Report	Stephano

=== Group B ===
Pos	Team	Pld	W	W+	WP	L	GF	GA	GD	Pts	Qualification
1	Mozambique	3	3	0	0	0	16	9	+7	9	Knockout stage
2	Morocco	3	2	0	0	1	10	6	+4	6	Knockout stage
3	Egypt	3	1	0	0	2	20	13	+7	3	5th place play-off
4	Seychelles	3	0	0	0	3	6	24	−18	0	

Source: CAF
23 May 2021
15:00

Egypt	5–7	Mozambique
H. Paulo; A. Elshahat	Report	Manuel; Rachide; Fadil

23 May 2021
16:15

Morocco	5–1	Seychelles
Kerroum; El Hadaoui; Aboutalbi; El Mahrouk; Ghannam	Report	Bamboche

24 May 2021
17:30

Mozambique	7–3	Seychelles
Manuel; Yuran; Rachide	Report	Bamboche; Autre; Amade

25 May 2021
16:15

Seychelles	2–12	Egypt
Bamboche; Gift	Report	A. Elshahat; Zezo; H. Paulo; H. Costa; Mohamed; Elshaffy; Eslam

25 May 2021
17:30

Mozambique	2–1	Morocco
Manuel; Rachide	Report	El Ouariry

26 May 2021
16:15

Egypt	3–4	Morocco
H. Paulo; Hassan. M; A. Elshahat	Report	Aboutalbi; El Hadaoui; Ghannam

== 5th place play-off ==
The teams finishing in third place in the groups are knocked out of title-winning contention, receding to play in a consolation match to determine 5th and 6th place in the final standings.

28 May 2021
15:00

Tanzania	2–4	Egypt
Said Kashiru; Ismail Gambo	Report	Eslam; H. Paulo; A. Nasser

== Knockout stage ==
The group winners and runners-up progress to the knockout stage to continue to compete for the title. 27 May was allocated as a rest day.

Semi-finals
28 May
Senegal	3
Morocco	2
28 May
Mozambique	6
Uganda	3

Final
29 May
Senegal	4
Mozambique	1
Third place play-off
29 May
Morocco	5
Uganda	3

=== Semi finals ===
Winners qualify for the 2021 FIFA Beach Soccer World Cup.

28 May 2021
16:15

Senegal	3–2	Morocco
Fall; Diatta; Mendy	Report	Aboutalbi; Iazal

28 May 2021
17:30

Mozambique	6–3	Uganda
Rachide; Manuel	Report	Lukooya; Wasswa; Lule

=== Third place play-off ===
29 May 2021
16:15

Morocco	5–3	Uganda
Aboutalbi; El Hadaoui; Abada	Report	Wasswa; Lukooya

=== Final ===
29 May 2021
17:30

Senegal	4–1	Mozambique
Mendy; Diatta; Boye	Report	Dez

== Awards ==
=== Winners trophy ===
2021 Africa Beach Soccer Cup of Nations
champions

Senegal
Sixth title

=== Individual awards ===
The following awards were given at the conclusion of the tournament:

Best player
(Mozambique) Nelson Manuel
Top scorer
(Mozambique) Nelson Manuel
10 goals
Best goalkeeper
(Senegal) Al Seyni Ndiaye

== Goalscorers ==
There were 102 goals scored in 14 matches, for an average of 7.29 goals per match.

10 goals

- (Mozambique) Nelson Manuel

9 goals

- (Egypt) Hossam "Paulo" Hassan
- (Mozambique) Rachide Sefo Smith

6 goals

- (Morocco) Rabi Aboutalbi

5 goals

- (Senegal) Raoul Mendy

4 goals

- (Uganda) Emmanuel Alex Wasswa
- (Senegal) Babacar Fall
- (Egypt) Ahmed Elshahat
- (Morocco) Nassim El Hadaoui

3 goals

- (Uganda) Isma Kawawulo
- (Senegal) Ninou Diatta
- (Seychelles) Ronny Bamboche

2 goals

- (Uganda) Baker Lukooya
- (Senegal) Mamadou Sylla
- (Tanzania) Jaruph Rajab Juma
- (Tanzania) Stephano Walles Mapunda
- (Egypt) Haitham Mahsoub
- (Egypt) Mohamed Hassan
- (Egypt) Abdelrahman Hassan
- (Egypt) Eslam Salama
- (Mozambique) Yuran Jose Malate
- (Morocco) Driss Ghannam

1 goal

- (Uganda) Rica Byaruhanga
- (Uganda) Paul Lule
- (Senegal) Pope Boye
- (Tanzania) Kashiru Salumu Said
- (Tanzania) Ismail Gambo
- (Egypt) Abdelaziz Abdelaziz
- (Egypt) Ahmed Fayed
- (Egypt) Hassane Hussein
- (Mozambique) Fadil Ainadine
- (Mozambique) Ramossete Cumbe
- (Morocco) Yassine Kerroum
- (Morocco) Kamal El Mahrouk
- (Morocco) Ismail El Ouariry
- (Morocco) Sami Iazal
- (Morocco) Yassir Abada
- (Seychelles) Lorddy Autre
- (Seychelles) Terence Amade
- (Seychelles) Robinson Gift

== Final standings ==
Qualified for the 2021 FIFA Beach Soccer World Cup

Rank	Team
1st place, gold medalist(s)	Senegal
2nd place, silver medalist(s)	Mozambique
3rd place, bronze medalist(s)	Morocco
4	Uganda
5	Egypt
6	Tanzania
7	Seychelles

== Qualified teams for FIFA Beach Soccer World Cup ==
The following two teams from CAF qualify for the 2021 FIFA Beach Soccer World Cup.

Team	Qualified on	Previous appearances in FIFA Beach Soccer World Cup^{1} only FIFA era (since 2005)
Senegal	28 May 2021	7 (2007, 2008, 2011, 2013, 2015, 2017, 2019)
Mozambique	28 May 2021	0 (Debut)

^{1} Bold indicates champions for that year. Italic indicates hosts for that year.
