= Seychelles national beach soccer team =

Sports team representing Seychelles

Seychelles
- Nickname: The Pirates
- Association: Seychelles Football Federation
- Confederation: CAF (Africa)
- Sub-confederation: COSAFA (Southern Africa)
- Head coach: Herald Kowlessur
- FIFA code: SEY
- BSWW ranking: 45 (2 September 2026)
First colours
Second colours

First international
- Madagascar 8–3 Seychelles (Mahajanga, Madagascar; 13 December 2014)

Biggest win
- Seychelles 3–1 Saudi Arabia (Durban, South Africa; 17 March 2024)

Biggest defeat
- Seychelles 1–12 Ghana (Roche Caiman, Seychelles; 19 April 2015)

World Cup
- Appearances: 1 (first in 2025)
- Best result: Group stage (2025)

Beach Soccer Africa Cup of Nations
- Appearances: 2 (first in 2015)
- Best result: Seventh place (2021)

COSAFA Beach Soccer Championship
- Appearances: 4 (first in 2015)
- Best result: Fifth place (2015)

The Seychelles national beach soccer team represents Seychelles in beach soccer. It is controlled by the Seychelles football association. Seychelles have taken part in the Africa Beach Soccer Cup of Nations once in 2015. Ten years later, they currently participating in the FIFA Beach Soccer World Cup for the very first time in 2025 where they made their debut as host.

== History ==
Following the successful bid to host the 2015 CAF Beach Soccer Championship, officially awarded in October 2013. the country launched its first-ever beach soccer league that same year, paving the way for the formation of its national team in 2014. In December of that year, led by Malagasy coach Robert Edmond, the team traveled to Madagascar for two friendly matches against the host nation. They played their first international game on 13 December, losing 3–8, followed by a 2–5 defeat in the second match. In January the following year, the team began their competitive journey at the 2015 African Trophy in Durban, where the Pirates finished 8th after suffering three defeats. One month later, Brazilian coach Bruno Malias Mendes was appointed as the head coach of the national team. In April 2015, the island nation hosted the inaugural COSAFA Beach Soccer Championship, where they claimed their first international victory with a 4–3 win over Malawi, followed by a 1–0 triumph against South Africa to secure 5th place, their best finish in the tournament's history up to date. Three days later, they made their debut in the CAF Beach Soccer Championship with a 1–10 loss to Nigeria. Despite improved performances in narrow defeats to Ivory Coast (1–2) and Egypt (2–5), Seychelles ended the group stage winless. They went on to lose their placement matches, including a heavy 1–12 defeat to Ghana, finishing last in their first appearance. The team went on a three-year hiatus before returning in November 2018 to compete in the Copa Dar es Salaam, and again in 2019, marking their only appearances before 2021. They qualified for the 2021 Beach Soccer Africa Cup of Nations after Madagascar withdrew from the qualifiers, granting them a second appearance at the continental tournament. However, like their debut, the team finished winless and placed last overall. Having only competed in the COSAFA Beach Soccer Championships since then and failing to qualify for subsequent editions of the continental cup, the team received a major boost when FIFA awarded them the hosting rights for the 2025 FIFA Beach Soccer World Cup on 16 December 2022.

== Coaching history ==
- (Madagascar) Robert Edmond (2014–2015)
- (Brazil) Bruno (2015)
- (Seychelles) Herald Kowlessur (2019)
- (Seychelles) Don Anacoura (2021)
- (Seychelles) Alpha Baldé (2022)
- (Madagascar) Edmond Robert (2022)
- (Seychelles) Herald Kowlessur (2023–present)

== Players ==
=== Current squad ===
The following 12 players were called to the squad for the 2025 FIFA Beach Soccer World Cup, held in the island from 1 to 11 May 2025.

No.	Pos.	Player	Date of birth (age)	Club
1	GK	Damien Adela	6 November 1985 (age 40)	(Seychelles Football Federation) One Stone
12	GK	Dominic Bouchereau	10 September 1998 (age 28)	(Seychelles Football Federation) Equator
2	DF	Herrode Prosper	6 November 1993 (age 32)	(Seychelles Football Federation) One Stone
3	DF	Rondy Onezime	15 July 1988 (age 38)	(The Football Association) Portsmouth BSC
4	DF	Mike Balette	13 March 1990 (age 36)	(Seychelles Football Federation) Equator
5	DF	Lienal Bibi	19 August 2008 (age 18)	(Seychelles Football Federation) La Passe U17
8	DF	Brandon Labrosse	11 March 1990 (age 36)	(Seychelles Football Federation) Forester BSC
9	DF	Ryan Servina	27 July 1995 (age 31)	(Seychelles Football Federation) One Stone
10	DF	Remy De Ketelaere	21 April 1996 (age 30)	(Seychelles Football Federation) Equator
6	FW	Wayne Sarah	2 October 2002 (age 24)	(Seychelles Football Federation) Skychef
7	FW	Terrence Amade	21 June 1990 (age 36)	(Seychelles Football Federation) Equator
11	FW	Martin William	22 July 1991 (age 35)	(Seychelles Football Federation) One Stone

== Competitive record ==
=== FIFA Beach Soccer World Cup ===
FIFA Beach Soccer World Cup
Year	Round	Position	Pld	W	D*	L	GF	GA
(Brazil) 2005 to (United Arab Emirates) 2023	Did not qualify							
(Seychelles) 2025	Group stage	16th	3	0	0	8	20	–12
Total	1/13	-	3	0	0	8	20	–12

=== Beach Soccer Africa Cup of Nations ===
Beach Soccer Africa Cup of Nations
Year	Round	Position	Pld	W	D*	L	GF	GA
(South Africa) 2006 to (Morocco) 2013	Did not qualify							
(Seychelles) 2015	Group stage	8th	3	0	0	3	4	17
(Nigeria) 2016 to (Egypt) 2018	Did not qualify							
(Senegal) 2021	Group stage	7th	3	0	0	3	6	24
(Mozambique) 2022 to (Egypt) 2024	Did not qualify							
Total	Group Stage	2/9	6	0	0	6	10	41
