= Jelili Ogunmuyiwa =

Nigerian football referee (born 1979)

- Born: 31 March 1979 (age 47); Nigeria

Domestic
- Years: League

Jelili Ogunmuyiwa (born 31 March 1979) is a Nigerian football referee who currently operates in the Nigeria Premier League and also international beach soccer tournaments. Born in Ikorodu, Lagos State, Jelili was selected to officiate the final match of the 2015 CAF Beach Soccer Championship between Senegal and Madagascar. Jelili officiated 4 matches at the 2015 FIFA Beach Soccer World Cup after he had previously officiated at the 2011 tournament.

== Accolades ==
- 1st Nigeria Pitch Awards – Referee of the Year
