= Mozambique national beach soccer team =

National sports team

Mozambique
- Nickname: Mambas
- Association: Mozambican Football Federation
- Confederation: CAF (Africa)
- Head coach: Abineiro Ussaca
- FIFA code: MOZ
- BSWW ranking: 50 ▲3 (2 September 2026)

First international
- Cape Verde 6–5 Mozambique (Durban, South Africa; 3 July 2007)

Biggest win
- Mozambique 7–3 Seychelles (Saly, Senegal; 24 May 2021)

Biggest defeat
- Senegal 10-0 Mozambique (Durban, South Africa; 27 March 2008)

World Cup
- Appearances: 1 (first in 2021)
- Best result: Group Stage (2021)

Africa Beach Soccer Cup of Nations
- Appearances: 4 (first in 2007)
- Best result: Runners-up (2021)

The Mozambique national beach soccer team represents Mozambique in international beach soccer competitions and is controlled by the Mozambican Football Federation, the nation's governing body for football. They have qualified for the Africa Beach Soccer Cup of Nations four times, and made their Beach Soccer World Cup debut in 2021.

== Results and fixtures ==
The following is a list of match results in the last 12 months, as well as any future matches that have been scheduled.

Legend

Win Draw Lose Fixture

== Players ==
=== Current squad ===
The following players and staff members were called up for the 2021 FIFA Beach Soccer World Cup.

Note: Flags indicate national team as defined under FIFA eligibility rules; some limited exceptions apply. Players may hold more than one non-FIFA nationality.

No.	Pos.	Nation	Player
1	GK	MOZ	Manuel Domingos Tivane
2	DF	MOZ	Bachir Augusto Mussa
3	DF	MOZ	Angelo Artur Tomas
4	DF	MOZ	Hermino Marcelino Ernesto
5	DF	MOZ	Gerson Vicente Chivale
6	DF	MOZ	Nelson João Manuel
7	MF	MOZ	Yuran José Malate

No.	Pos.	Nation	Player
8	FW	MOZ	Gabriel Geraldo Macuvele
9	MF	MOZ	António José Pedro Namape Júnior (Figo)
10	MF	MOZ	Rachide Sefo Smithe
11	FW	MOZ	Helder Jose Mahumane
12	GK	MOZ	Anivaldo Donaldo Geraldo Mavie
13	DF	MOZ	Ramossete Alexandre Cumbe
14	GK	MOZ	Pedro Xavier da Barca

Head coach: Abineiro Adolfo Ussaca
Assistant coach: José Fernando Machava
Goalkeeping coach: Sérgio Paulo Munjovo

== Competitive record ==
=== FIFA Beach Soccer World Cup ===
FIFA World Cup record										Qualification (CAF) record								
Year	Round	Pos	Pld	W	W+	L	GF	GA	GD	Round	Pos	Pld	W	W+	L	GF	GA	GD
(Brazil) 2005	Did not enter									No qualification tournaments								
(Brazil) 2006	Did not enter									Did not enter								
(Brazil) 2007	Did not qualify									Group stage	8th	3	0	0	3	8	21	–13
(France) 2008	Did not qualify									Group stage	7th	3	1	0	2	6	20	–14
(United Arab Emirates) 2009	Did not qualify									6th place	6th	3	1	0	2	11	18	–7
(Italy) 2011	Did not qualify									Did not enter								
(French Polynesia) 2013	Did not qualify									Did not enter								
(Portugal) 2015	Did not qualify									Did not qualify								
(The Bahamas) 2017	Did not qualify									Did not qualify								
(Paraguay) 2019	Did not qualify									Did not qualify								
(Russia) 2021	Group stage	11th	3	1	0	2	15	18	–3	Runners-up	2nd	5	4	0	1	23	16	+7
(United Arab Emirates) 2023	Did not qualify																	
(Seychelles) 2025	To be determined																	
Total	0 titles	1/11	3	1	0	2	15	18	–3	0 titles	4/10	14	6	0	8	48	75	–27

=== Africa Beach Soccer Cup of Nations ===
The Mozambique national beach soccer team was created for the 2007 CAF Beach Soccer Championship. They have never qualified from the group stage, only ever registering two wins before the 2021 edition: one against South Africa in 2008 and one on penalties against Libya in 2009.

BSAFCON record
Year	Round	Pos	Pld	W	W+	L	GF	GA	GD
(South Africa) 2006	Did not participate								
(South Africa) 2007	Group Stage	8th	3	0	0	3	8	21	-13
(South Africa) 2008	Group Stage	7th	3	1	0	2	6	20	-14
(South Africa) 2009	Group Stage	6th	3	1	0	2	11	18	-7
(Morocco) 2011	Did not participate								
(Morocco) 2013	Did not participate								
(Seychelles) 2015	Did not qualify								
(Nigeria) 2016	Did not qualify								
(Egypt) 2018	Did not qualify								
(Senegal) 2021	Runners-up	2nd	5	4	0	1	23	16	+7
(Mozambique) 2022	Fourth place	4th	4	2	0	2	9	12	+8
(Egypt) 2024	To be determined								
Total	0 titles	6/12	18	8	0	10	57	87	-19
