= 2018 Beach Soccer Africa Cup of Nations =

2018 Africa Beach Soccer Cup of Nations
2019 FIFA Beach Soccer World Cup CAF qualifier

Tournament details
- Host country: Egypt
- City: Sharm El Sheikh
- Dates: 8–14 December
- Teams: 8 (from 1 confederation)
- Venue: 1 (in 1 host city)

Final positions
- Champions: Senegal (2nd title)
- Runners-up: Nigeria
- Third place: Egypt
- Fourth place: Morocco

Tournament statistics
- Matches played: 20
- Goals scored: 185 (9.25 per match)
- Top scorer(s): (Ivory Coast) Assouan Eric Kablan (Madagascar) Regis Enidiel (9 goals each)

The 2018 Africa Beach Soccer Cup of Nations was the third edition of the Africa Beach Soccer Cup of Nations (BSAFCON), the premier beach soccer championship in Africa contested by men's national teams who are members of the Confederation of African Football (CAF). Originally organised by Beach Soccer Worldwide (BSWW) under the title FIFA Beach Soccer World Cup CAF qualifier (informally known as CAF Beach Soccer Championship), in 2015, CAF became organisers and began using the BSAFCON title to which the competition was officially renamed the next year. Overall, this was the 9th edition of the event.

The tournament was played in Sharm El Sheikh, Egypt; the North African country was awarded the hosting rights as they were the only nation to express interest by the deadline. The finals were held from 8–14 December. Qualification took place between 7–23 September.

The event also acted as the qualification route for African teams to the 2019 FIFA Beach Soccer World Cup in Paraguay; the winners and runners-up qualify.

Senegal were the defending champions and successfully defended their title, after defeating Nigeria 6–1 in the final to secure their 5th title.

== Qualification ==
2018 Africa Beach Soccer Cup of Nations qualification
Tournament details
- Dates: 7–22 September
- Teams: 10 (from 1 confederation)

Tournament statistics
- Matches played: 4
- Goals scored: 31 (7.75 per match)
- Top scorer: (Madagascar) Regis Enidiel (5 goals)

The 2018 Africa Beach Soccer Cup of Nations qualifying rounds determine the eight teams that will compete in the final tournament in December.

The fixtures were approved by CAF on 11 June.

Qualification ties are played on a home-and-away, two-legged basis. If the sides are level on aggregate after the second leg, the away goals rule is applied, and if still level, the tie proceeds directly to a penalty shoot-out (no extra time is played).

Hosts of the finals, Egypt, along with the champions and runners up of the last edition, Senegal and Nigeria respectively, received byes in qualifying; ten other nations contested five qualification berths.

Ghana were due to play but failed to meet participation criteria by the May 31 entry deadline.

=== Entrants ===
Round	Teams entering round	No. of teams
Qualification	Ivory Coast (6th); Libya (8th); Kenya (11th); Madagascar (5th); Morocco (3rd); Mozambique (10th); South Africa (13th); Sudan (n/a); Tanzania (12th); Uganda (16th)	10
Final tournament	Egypt (2nd); Nigeria (4th); Senegal (1st)	3

Note: The numbers in parentheses show the African ranking of the teams at the time of the qualification round (out of 20 nations).

=== Matches ===
==== Summary ====
The first legs were scheduled for 7–9 September, and the second legs were scheduled for 21–23 September 2018.

The winners of each tie qualified for the finals.

Team 1	Agg.	Team 2	1st leg	2nd leg
Uganda	5–7	**Ivory Coast**	1–3	4–4
Kenya	w/o	**Libya**	—	—
**Tanzania**	w/o	South Africa	—	—
Sudan	w/o	**Morocco**	—	—
Mozambique	9–10	**Madagascar**	4–5	5–5

Bold: Tie winners; qualified for finals.

==== Details ====
9 September 2018	**Uganda**	**1–3**	**Ivory Coast**	Spennah Beach, Entebbe
16:00 UTC+3	Muganga	Report	Kablan; Kouassitchi; Aka	Referee: Olawale Adeolu Fawole (Nigeria)

21 September 2018	**Ivory Coast**	**4–4**	**Uganda**	Parc des sports de Treichville, Abidjan
16:00 UTC+0	Aka; Kabletchi; Djedjed	Report	Muganga; Katwe; Alex; Lwesibawa	Referee: Youssouph Signate (Senegal)

Ivory Coast won 7–5 on aggregate.

9 September 2018	**Kenya**	**Cancelled**	**Libya**	Pirates Beach, Mombasa
15:00 UTC+3		Report

21 September 2018	**Libya**	**Cancelled**	**Kenya**
		Report

Libya won on walkover after Kenya withdrew.

9 September 2018	**Tanzania**	**Cancelled**	**South Africa**	Dar es Salaam
15:00 UTC+3		Report		Referee: Hamdi Bchir (Tunisia)

21 September 2018	**South Africa**	**Cancelled**	**Tanzania**
		Report		Referee: Tsaralaza Maolidy (Madagascar)

Tanzania won on walkover after South Africa withdrew.

7 September 2018	**Sudan**	**Cancelled**	**Morocco**
		Report

21 September 2018	**Morocco**	**Cancelled**	**Sudan**
		Report

Morocco won on walkover after Sudan withdrew.

9 September 2018	**Mozambique**	**4–5**	**Madagascar**	Afrin Prestige, Maputo
15:00 UTC+2	Ainadine; De Jesus Novela; Mangue; Silvestre	Report	Regis; Toky	Referee: Louis Siave (Mauritius)

22 September 2018	**Madagascar**	**5–5**	**Mozambique**	Majunga Beach, Mahajanga
15:00 UTC+3	Razafinilaina; Regis; Giovanni; Richard; Flavien	Report	Massingue; De Jesus Novela; Gerson; Malate; Ainadine	Referee: Ivan Bayige Kintu (Uganda)

Madagascar won 10–9 on aggregate.

=== Qualified teams ===
The following eight teams qualified for the final tournament:

Team	Appearance	Previous best performance
Egypt (hosts)	9th	3rd place (2006, 2011, 2016)
Ivory Coast	9th	Runners-up (2009, 2013)
Libya	5th	7th place (2009, 2013)
Madagascar	5th	**Champions** (2015)
Morocco	7th	3rd place (2013)
Nigeria	9th	**Champions** (2007, 2009)
Senegal	8th	**Champions** (2008, 2011, 2013, 2016)
Tanzania	1st	Debut

== Draw ==
The draw for the final tournament was held on 28 October 2018 at the CAF Headquarters in Cairo, Egypt. The eight teams were drawn into two groups of four.

Initially, two teams were automatically assigned to the groups:

- to Group A: as the hosts, Egypt
- to Group B: as the champions of the last edition, Senegal

The remaining six teams were split into two pots: one of two and one of four; the highest seeds were placed in Pot 1 and the lowest seeds were placed in Pot 2. The teams were seeded based on their results in the 2016 Africa Beach Soccer Cup of Nations. From Pot 1, one team was drawn into Group A and the other team was drawn into Group B; from Pot 2, two teams were drawn into Group A and two teams were drawn into Group B.

Pot 1	Pot 2
Nigeria; Morocco	Madagascar; Ivory Coast; Libya; Tanzania

== Referees ==
The following 21 referees will officiate the tournament:

- (Ivory Coast) Innocent Desire Adjoumani
- (Ivory Coast) Wonan Dominique Sidoine Toppe
- (Madagascar) Tsaralaza Maolidy
- (Mauritius) Louis Siave
- (Mauritius) Reetesh Loll
- (Nigeria) Olawale Adeolu Fawole
- (Nigeria) Olayanka Olajide
- (Nigeria) Sani Mohammed
- (Senegal) Aly Deme
- (Senegal) Mbokh Beye
- (Senegal) Oumar Sagna
- (Senegal) Youssouph Signate
- (Sudan) Fadul Abdelmajeed Adam
- (Sudan) Hassan Mohamed Eltoum
- (Sudan) Nagi Ali Doka
- (Sudan) Yasir Allahgabu Abdelrahman Tootoo
- (Tunisia) Hamdi Bchir
- (Tunisia) Med El Habib Hiba
- (Uganda) Ivan Kintu
- (Uganda) Muhammad Ssenteza
- (Uganda) Shafic Mugerwa

== Venue ==
Location of Sharm El Sheikh in Egypt

One venue was used in the city of Sharm El Sheikh.

- All matches took place at a purpose built arena at Laguna Vista Beach Resort, known as the Laguna Vista Beach Soccer Stadium, with a capacity of 1,200.

== Squads ==
Each squad can contain a maximum of 12 players.

== Group stage ==
Each team earns three points for a win in regulation time, two points for a win in extra time, one point for a win in a penalty shoot-out, and no points for a defeat. The top two teams from each group advance to the semi-finals.

All times are local, EET (UTC+2).

=== Group A ===
Pos	Team	Pld	W	W+	WP	L	GF	GA	GD	Pts	Qualification
1	Egypt (H)	3	3	0	0	0	20	6	+14	9	Knockout stage
2	Morocco	3	2	0	0	1	12	14	−2	6	Knockout stage
3	Madagascar	3	1	0	0	2	10	13	−3	3	Placement stage (5th–8th place)
4	Ivory Coast	3	0	0	0	3	10	19	−9	0	Placement stage (5th–8th place)

Source: CAF
Rules for classification: Group stage tiebreakers
(H) Host
8 December 2018
14:30

Egypt	6–1	Morocco
Hassan 20'; Aly 29'; Mohamed 32'; Samir 33'; Shaaban 33'; Ahmed 34'	Report	Elkhdym 33'

Laguna Vista Stadium, Sharm El Sheikh
Referee: Louis Siave (Mauritius)
9 December 2018
12:00

Ivory Coast	3–4	Madagascar
Aka 3', 8'; Papet 32'	Report	Enidiel 1', 34' (pen.); Fitana 4'; Razafimandimby 15' (pen.)

Laguna Vista Stadium, Sharm El Sheikh
Referee: Youssouph Signate (Senegal)

10 December 2018
12:00

Morocco	5–4	Ivory Coast
El Hadaoui 1', 16', 21'; Abada 15'; Iazal 28'	Report	Aka 4'; Kablan 31', 33' (pen.), 34'

Laguna Vista Stadium, Sharm El Sheikh
Referee: Hamdi Bchir (Tunisia)
10 December 2018
13:15

Madagascar	2–4	Egypt
Fitana 5'; Enidiel 11'	Report	Samir 1' (pen.); Hassan 3'; Aly 12'; El-Shahat 22'

Laguna Vista Stadium, Sharm El Sheikh
Referee: Louis Siave (Mauritius)

11 December 2018
13:15

Morocco	6–4	Madagascar
Iazal 1'; Elkhdym 4'; El Hamidy 8', 18'; El Hadaoui 10'; Kerroum 14'	Report	Razafinilaina 15', 15'; Fitana 21'; Richard 24'

Laguna Vista Stadium, Sharm El Sheikh
Referee: Hamdi Bchir (Tunisia)
11 December 2018
14:30

Egypt	10–3	Ivory Coast
Samir 3'; Taha 13', 14', 22'; Atef 20', 33'; El-Sayed 22'; Hassan 32', 35'; Ahmed 36'	Report	Aka 21'; Djedjed 34', 35'

Laguna Vista Stadium, Sharm El Sheikh
Referee: Reetesh Loll (Mauritius)

=== Group B ===
Pos	Team	Pld	W	W+	WP	L	GF	GA	GD	Pts	Qualification
1	Senegal	3	2	0	1	0	26	7	+19	7	Knockout stage
2	Nigeria	3	2	0	0	1	14	9	+5	6	Knockout stage
3	Libya	3	1	0	0	2	9	18	−9	3	Placement stage (5th–8th place)
4	Tanzania	3	0	0	0	3	6	21	−15	0	Placement stage (5th–8th place)

Source: CAF
Rules for classification: Group stage tiebreakers
8 December 2018
12:00

Senegal	4–4 (a.e.t.)	Nigeria
Diassy 3', 5'; Diagne 21'; Barry 34'	Report	Ekujimi 20'; Adams 26', 34'; Ogbonna 28'
Penalties
Diatta (penalty missed); Ndoye (penalty scored); Diassy (penalty scored)	2–0	(penalty missed) Ohwoferia; (penalty missed) Ekujimi

Laguna Vista Stadium, Sharm El Sheikh
Referee: Hany Farouk El Eraky (Egypt)
8 December 2018
13:15

Libya	5–2	Tanzania
Al-Abidi 3'; Rahoumah 7', 10'; El-Mengawi 30', 33'	Report	Abdallah 5'; Ahmada 18'

Laguna Vista Stadium, Sharm El Sheikh
Referee: Adil Ouchker (Morocco)

9 December 2018
13:15

Nigeria	6–3	Libya
Ogbonna 1', 19'; Azeez 9', 20'; Mohammed 10'; Ohwoferia 11'	Report	Al-Abidi 3', 7'; Zaed 23'

Laguna Vista Stadium, Sharm El Sheikh
Referee: Said Nassur Hachim (Madagascar)
9 December 2018
14:30

Tanzania	2–12	Senegal
Ibrahim 23' (pen.); Tumbo 24'	Report	Diassy 2', 13'; Diagne 4'; Barry 6' (pen.); Ndiaye 8'; Mendy 11', 34', 35'; Bleck 16'; Fall 17'; Diouf 20', 24'

Laguna Vista Stadium, Sharm El Sheikh
Referee: Ahmed Abdelhamid Nofal (Egypt)

10 December 2018
14:30

Nigeria	4–2	Tanzania
Azeez 5'; Ohwoferia 21'; Ujukwu 22'; Adams 32'	Report	Tumbo 12'; Juma 26'

Laguna Vista Stadium, Sharm El Sheikh
Referee: Driss Lamghaidar (Morocco)
11 December 2018
12:00

Senegal	10–1	Libya
Diagne 5', 23'; Diatta 9', 10'; Fall 16'; Diouf 18'; Bleck 24'; Diassy 29'; Ndoye 30'; Mendy 31'	Report	Aburaghiga 33'

Laguna Vista Stadium, Sharm El Sheikh
Referee: Said Nassur Hachim (Madagascar)

== Placement stage (5th–8th place) ==
=== Bracket (5th–8th place) ===
Fifth place semi-finals
12 December
Madagascar	5
Tanzania	2
12 December
Libya	3
Ivory Coast	6

Fifth place match
13 December
Madagascar (a.e.t.)	9
Ivory Coast	8
Seventh place match
13 December
Tanzania (a.e.t.)	6
Libya	5

=== Fifth place semi-finals ===
12 December 2018
12:00

Madagascar	5–2	Tanzania
Ramanantsoany 2'; Andriamifehy 4'; Enidiel 9', 35'; Fitana 29'	Report	Mauru 8'; Juma 17'

Laguna Vista Stadium, Sharm El Sheikh
Referee: Aly Deme (Senegal)

12 December 2018
13:15

Libya	3–6	Ivory Coast
Zaed 8'; Rahoumah 28'; Al-Shareef 33'	Report	Kabletchi 8', 35'; Abe 11', 30'; Kablan 14'; Aka 26'

Laguna Vista Stadium, Sharm El Sheikh
Referee: Ivan Bayige Kintu (Uganda)

=== Seventh place match ===
13 December 2018
13:15

Tanzania	6–5 (a.e.t.)	Libya
Juma 14', 28', 37'; Tumbo 22'; Ibrahim 30'; Msonjo 36'	Report	Rahoumah 6', 18'; Al-Abidi 15'; Aburaghiga 23', 33'

Laguna Vista Stadium, Sharm El Sheikh
Referee: Driss Lamghaidar (Morocco)

=== Fifth place match ===
13 December 2018
14:30

Madagascar	9–8 (a.e.t.)	Ivory Coast
Ramanantsoany 6'; Enidiel 12', 27', 38', 39'; Razafimandimby 14'; Richard 17'; Rabeasimbola 19' (pen.); Ratsimarinala 34'	Report	Kablan 11', 11', 19' (pen.), 25', 28'; Aka 32', 36', 38'

Laguna Vista Stadium, Sharm El Sheikh
Referee: Ahmed Abdelhamid Nofal (Egypt)

== Knockout stage ==
=== Bracket (1st–4th place) ===
Semi-finals
12 December
Egypt	6
Nigeria	7
13 December
Senegal	7
Morocco	2

Final
14 December
Nigeria	1
Senegal	6
Third place match
14 December
Egypt	3
Morocco	2

=== Semi-finals ===
Winners qualify for 2019 FIFA Beach Soccer World Cup.

12 December 2018
14:30

Egypt	6–7	Nigeria
Aly 10'; Atef 18'; Samir 23', 27'; Hassan 29' (pen.), 33'	Report	Azeez 6', 21', 26', 31'; Adams 9'; Ogbonna 20', 36'

Laguna Vista Stadium, Sharm El Sheikh
Referee: Adil Ouchker (Morocco)

13 December 2018
12:00

Senegal	7–2	Morocco
Diassy 8', 34'; Ndiaye 9'; Barry 10', 21'; Mendy 15'; Diatta 27'	Report	Ennakhli 26'; El Hadaoui 30'

Laguna Vista Stadium, Sharm El Sheikh
Referee: Said Nassur Hachim (Madagascar)

=== Third place match ===
14 December 2018
13:15

Egypt	3–2	Morocco
Hassan 15'; Ahmed 22'; Aly 25'	Report	Iazal 18'; El Hadaoui 36'

Laguna Vista Stadium, Sharm El Sheikh
Referee: Youssouph Signate (Senegal)

=== Final ===
14 December 2018
14:30

Nigeria	1–6	Senegal
Azeez 1'	Report	Diagne 2', 35'; Diassy 5'; Fall 28'; Mendy 30', 32'

Laguna Vista Stadium, Sharm El Sheikh
Referee: Hany Farouk El Eraky (Egypt)

== Goalscorers ==
There have been 185 goals scored in 20 matches, for an average of 9.25 goals per match.

9 goals

- (Ivory Coast) Assouan Eric Kablan
- (Madagascar) Regis Enidiel

8 goals

- (Ivory Coast) Kablan Frederic Aka
- (Nigeria) Abu Azeez
- (Senegal) Lansana Diassy

7 goals

- (Egypt) Mohamed Abdelnaby Hassan
- (Senegal) Raoul Mendy

6 goals

- (Morocco) Nassim El Hadaoui
- (Senegal) Mamour Diagne

5 goals

- (Egypt) Moustafa Samir
- (Libya) Waleed Rahoumah
- (Nigeria) Emeka Ogbonna
- (Tanzania) Jaruph Juma

4 goals

- (Egypt) Moustafa Aly
- (Libya) Islam Al-Abidi
- (Madagascar) Romain Fitana
- (Nigeria) Taiwo Adams
- (Senegal) Hamidou Barry

3 goals

- (Egypt) Abdelrahaman Hassan Ahmed
- (Egypt) Haitham Atef
- (Egypt) El-Husseini Taha
- (Libya) Abbulhamid Aburaghiga
- (Morocco) Sami Iazal
- (Senegal) Ninou Diatta
- (Senegal) Hamad François Diouf
- (Senegal) Babacar Fall
- (Tanzania) Yahya Tumbo

2 goals

- (Ivory Coast) Blaise Abe
- (Ivory Coast) Nahounoud Guy Djedjed
- (Ivory Coast) N’Gnamke Kabletchi
- (Libya) Zuheir El-Mengawi
- (Libya) Esam Zaed
- (Madagascar) Hollas Ramanantsoany
- (Madagascar) Ymelda Razafimandimby
- (Madagascar) Angeluc Razafinilaina
- (Madagascar) Marcel Richard
- (Morocco) Azzeddine El Hamidy
- (Morocco) Ali Elkhdym
- (Nigeria) Emmanuel Ohwoferia
- (Senegal) Jean Charles Bleck
- (Senegal) Al Seyni Ndiaye
- (Tanzania) Juma Ibrahim

1 goal

- (Egypt) Karim El-Sayed
- (Egypt) Ahmed El-Shahat
- (Egypt) Hassane Mohamed
- (Egypt) Moustafa Ahmed Shaaban
- (Ivory Coast) Franck Papet
- (Libya) Adel Al-Shareef
- (Madagascar) Chrétien Andriamifehy
- (Madagascar) Tianasoa Rabeasimbola
- (Madagascar) Juliot Ratsimarinala
- (Morocco) Yassir Abada
- (Morocco) Miloud Ennakhli
- (Morocco) Yassine Kerroum
- (Nigeria) Eganosi Ekujimi
- (Nigeria) Suleman Mohammed
- (Nigeria) Emmanuel Ujukwu
- (Senegal) Papa Modou Ndoye
- (Tanzania) Ibrahim Abdallah
- (Tanzania) Abdi Ahmada
- (Tanzania) Samwel Mauru
- (Tanzania) Rolland Msonjo

== Final ranking ==
Qualified for the 2019 FIFA Beach Soccer World Cup

Rank	Team
1st place, gold medalist(s)	Senegal
2nd place, silver medalist(s)	Nigeria
3rd place, bronze medalist(s)	Egypt
4	Morocco
5	Madagascar
6	Ivory Coast
7	Tanzania
8	Libya

== Qualified teams for FIFA Beach Soccer World Cup ==
The following two teams from CAF qualify for the 2019 FIFA Beach Soccer World Cup.

Team	Qualified on	Previous appearances in FIFA Beach Soccer World Cup^{1} only FIFA era (since 2005)
Nigeria	12 December 2018	5 (2006, 2007, 2009, 2011, 2017)
Senegal	13 December 2018	6 (2007, 2008, 2011, 2013, 2015, 2017)

^{1} Bold indicates champions for that year. Italic indicates hosts for that year.
