= Madagascar national beach soccer team =

Madagascar
- Nickname: Barea
- Association: Malagasy Football Federation
- Confederation: CAF (Africa)
- Sub-confederation: COSAFA (Southern Africa)
- Head coach: Claude Barrabe
- Captain: Rabeasimbola Tianasoa
- FIFA code: MAD
- BSWW ranking: 84 ▼2 (2 June 2025)

World Cup
- Appearances: 1
- Best result: Group Stage (2015)

CAF Beach Soccer Championship
- Appearances: 6 (first in 2011)
- Best result: Champions (2015)

The Madagascar national beach soccer team represents Madagascar in international beach soccer competitions and is controlled by the Malagasy Football Federation, the governing body for football in Madagascar.

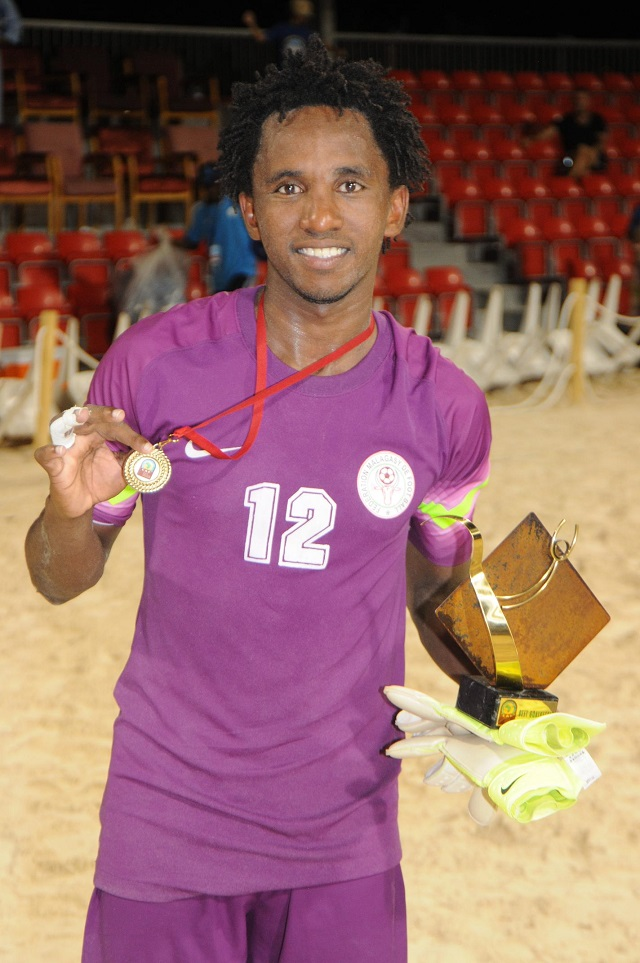
Jhorialy Rafalimanana receives 2015 CAF Beach Soccer Championship's Best goalkeeper award

== Current squad ==
Note: Flags indicate national team as defined under FIFA eligibility rules; some limited exceptions apply. Players may hold more than one non-FIFA nationality.

No.	Pos.	Nation	Player
1	GK		Jhorialy Rafalimanana
2	DF		Ymelda Razafimandimby
3	DF		Pierralit Tovonay
4	DF		Giovanni Oscar Etienne
5	MF		Anderson Solofoniaina Rakotoson
6	MF		Aime Rafidison

No.	Pos.	Nation	Player
7	MF		Tianasoa Rabeasimbola (captain)
8	MF		Tokiniaina Francegal Randriamapandry
9	MF		Aurelien Razamanana
10	FW		Flavien Razafimahatratra
11	FW		Juliot Ratsimarinala
12	GK		Rakotonirina Robin Jean Claude

== Achievements ==
=== CAF Beach Soccer Championship ===
Year	Round	Pos	Pld	W	W aet/pso	L	GF	GA	GD
Durban, South Africa 2006	Did not enter								
Durban, South Africa 2007	Did not enter								
Durban, South Africa 2008	Did not enter								
Durban, South Africa 2009	Did not enter								
Casablanca, Morocco 2011	Fourth Place	4	4	1	0	3	16	16	0
El Jadida, Morocco 2013	Group Stage	5	3	1	0	2	16	16	0
Roche Caiman, Seychelles 2015	Championship	1	5	2	3	0	25	16	9
Lagos, Nigeria 2016	Fifth Place	5	5	3	0	2	23	17	6
Sharm El Sheikh, Egypt 2018	Fifth Place	5	5	2	1	2	24	23	1
Saly, Senegal 2021	Did not qualify								
Vilankulo, Mozambique 2022	Group Stage	7	3	0	0	3	11	18	-7
Hurghada, Egypt 2024	Did not enter								
Total	1 Title	6/12	27	9	4	12	115	106	9

== See also ==
- 2011 CAF Beach Soccer Championship
- 2013 CAF Beach Soccer Championship
- 2015 CAF Beach Soccer Championship
