= Morocco national beach soccer team =

National sports team

Morocco
- Association: Royal Moroccan Football Federation
- Confederation: CAF (Africa)
- Head coach: Marco Octavio
- FIFA code: MAR
- BSWW ranking: 18 ▼2 (2 September 2026)
First colours
Second colours

World Cup
- Appearances: 0

CAF Beach Soccer Championship
- Appearances: 10 (first in 2006)
- Best result: Third Place (2013, 2021, 2022 and 2024)

Arab Beach Soccer Championship
- Appearances: 4 (first in 2008)
- Best result: (gold) Winner (2026)

The Morocco national beach soccer team represents Morocco in international beach soccer competitions and is controlled by the Royal Moroccan Football Federation, the governing body for football in Morocco.

== History ==
The national team has participated in the African Beach Soccer Championship nine times since 2006, and their best achievement is winning third place. Morocco has yet to qualify for the FIFA Beach Soccer World Cup.

In their third appearance in the Mediterranean Beach Games, Morocco managed to beat Egypt to win bronze in the 2023 Mediterranean Beach soccer.

On 9 November 2026, Morocco Claimed their first Arab cup title, defeating Mauritania 6–5 in the 2026 final.

== Tournament history ==
=== CAF Beach Soccer Championship ===
- 2006 – Sixth Place
- 2007 – Did not enter
- 2008 – Did not enter
- 2009 – Round 1
- 2011 – Round 1
- 2013 – Third Place
- 2015 – Fifth Place
- 2016 – Fourth Place
- 2018 - Fourth Place
- 2021 – Third Place
- 2022 – Third Place
- 2024 – Third Place
- 2026 –

=== Arab Beach Soccer Cup ===
- 2008 – Group stage
- 2014 – Group stage
- 2023 – Semi-finals
- 2026 – (gold) Champions

== Current squad ==
Correct as of May 2021.

Coach: Marco Octávio

Note: Flags indicate national team as defined under FIFA eligibility rules; some limited exceptions apply. Players may hold more than one non-FIFA nationality.

No.	Pos.	Nation	Player
1	GK		M'hamed Manar
2	DF		Reda Zahraoui
3	FW		Imad Laadimi
4	DF		Zouhair Jabbary
5	DF		Mohammed El Hichou
6	DF		Moussa chaatouf
7	DF		Ilyass R'quiouak
8	DF		Amine El Bidouri

No.	Pos.	Nation	Player
9	FW		Badr El Kraichly
10	FW		Adnan Oubahri
11	GK		Yassir Abada
12	FW		Driss Ghannam

== Honours ==
=== Official competitions ===
Africa Beach Soccer Cup of Nations

- Third-place: 2013, 2021, 2022, 2024

African Beach Games

- Winner: 2023
- Runners-up: 2019

Arab Beach Soccer Championship

- (gold) Winner: 2026
- Semi-finalists: 2023

COSAFA Beach Soccer Championship

- (gold) Winner: 2023

Mediterranean Beach Games

- Bronze Medal: 2023

=== Friendly Tournament ===
Casablanca Beach Soccer Tournament

- Champions: 2009, 2024
- Runners-up: 2022
- Third-place: 2010

El Salvador Beach Soccer Cup

- Champions: 2024
