= Ahmed Temsah =

Egyptian footballer (born 1986)

Personal information
- Date of birth: 12 April 1986 (age 40)
- Place of birth: Giza, Egypt
- Height: 1.82 m (5 ft 11 1/2 in)
- Positions: Midfielder; forward

Team information
- Current team: Smouha

Senior career*
Years	Team	Apps	(Gls)
2008–2015	El Dakhleya		
2013	→ Dhofar (loan)		
2015–	Smouha	00	(00)
2021–	El Sharqya Lldokhan Club	00	(01)

International career
2012–	Egypt	19	(2)
- * Club domestic league appearances and goals

Ahmed Temsah (Arabic: أحمد تمساح) (born 12 April 1986) is an Egyptian footballer who plays for El Dakhleya, as well as the Egypt national football team.
