= Senegal national beach soccer team =

Senegal
- Nickname: Les Lions de la Téranga
- Association: Senegalese Football Federation
- Confederation: CAF (Africa)
- Head coach: Oumar Sylla
- Most caps: Al Seyni Ndiaye (51)
- Top scorer: Babacar Fall (36)
- FIFA code: SEN
- BSWW ranking: 7 (2 September 2026)
First colours
Second colours

First international
- Senegal 5–3 Morocco (Durban, South Africa; 27 September 2006)

Biggest defeat
- Portugal 7–1 Senegal (Nazaré, Portugal; 13 August 2019)

World Cup
- Appearances: 10 (first in 2007)
- Best result: Fourth place (2021, 2025)

Africa Beach Soccer Cup of Nations
- Appearances: 11 (first in 2007)
- Best result: Champions (2008, 2011, 2013, 2016, 2018, 2021, 2022, 2024)

The Senegal national beach soccer team represents Senegal in international beach soccer competitions and is controlled by the Senegalese Football Federation, the governing body for football in Senegal. It is the most successful African beach soccer team, having won eight times the Africa Beach Soccer Cup of Nations, more than any other national team.

== Results and fixtures ==
The following is a list of match results in the last 12 months, as well as any future matches that have been scheduled.

Legend

Win Draw Lose Fixture

== Team ==
=== Current squad ===
The following players were called up for the 2021 FIFA Beach Soccer World Cup. Note: Flags indicate national team as defined under FIFA eligibility rules; some limited exceptions apply. Players may hold more than one non-FIFA nationality.

No.	Pos.	Nation	Player
1	GK		Al Seyni Ndiaye
2	DF		Ninou Jean Paul Diatta
3	DF		Pape Mar Boye
4	DF		Papa Demba Ndour
5	DF		Mamadou Sylla
6	DF		Amar Samb
7	MF		Babacar Fall

No.	Pos.	Nation	Player
8	FW		Seydina Mandione Laye Diagne
9	FW		Raoul Mendy
10	MF		Mamour Diagne
11	FW		Ibrahima Balde
12	GK		Amadou Ba
13	GK		Seydina Issa Laye Diagne
14	DF		Limamou Thiaw Niang

Head coach: Oumar Sylla
Assistant coach: Mamadou Diallo
Goalkeeping coach: Cheikh Tidiane Deme

== Competitive record ==
=== FIFA Beach Soccer World Cup ===
FIFA World Cup record										Qualification (CAF) record								
Year	Round	Pos	Pld	W	W+	L	GF	GA	GD	Round	Pos	Pld	W	W+	L	GF	GA	GD
(Brazil) 2005	Did not enter									No qualification tournaments								
(Brazil) 2006	Did not enter									Did not enter								
(Brazil) 2007	Quarterfinals	5th	4	2	1	1	18	14	+4	Runners-up	2nd	5	3	0	2	29	26	+3
(France) 2008	Group stage	9th	3	1	1	1	16	14	+2	Champions	1st	5	3	1	1	39	20	+19
(United Arab Emirates) 2009	Did not enter									Third place	3rd	4	3	0	1	22	20	+2
(Italy) 2011	Quarterfinals	7th	4	1	1	2	21	19	+2	Champions	1st	4	4	0	0	23	12	+11
(French Polynesia) 2013	Group stage	13th	3	1	0	2	11	17	–6	Champions	1st	5	5	0	0	34	17	+17
(Portugal) 2015	Group stage	11th	3	1	0	2	12	13	–1	Runners-up	2nd	4	1	1	3	17	15	+2
(The Bahamas) 2017	Quarterfinals	6th	4	2	0	2	26	12	+14	Champions	1st	5	5	0	0	28	10	+18
(Paraguay) 2019	Quarterfinals	6th	4	2	0	2	19	15	+4	Champions	1st	5	4	1	0	39	10	+29
(Russia) 2021	Fourth place	4th	6	2	1	3	27	25	+2	Champions	1st	4	4	0	0	15	5	+10
(United Arab Emirates) 2024	Group stage	10th	3	1	0	2	13	15	–2	Champions	1st	5	4	1	0	29	13	+16
(Seychelles) 2025	Fourth place	4th	6	4	0	2	25	18	+7	Champions	1st	5	4	0	1	22	11	+9
Total	0 titles	10/13	40	17	4	19	188	162	+26	8 titles	11/12	52	42	4	8	297	159	+138

=== CAF Beach Soccer Championship ===
The Senegalese is the most titled Beach Soccer team in Africa. The Lions of Teranga won nine medals in nine participations.

BSAFCON record
Year	Round	Pos	Pld	W	W+	L	GF	GA	GD
(South Africa) 2006	Did not enter								
(South Africa) 2007	Runner-up	2	5	3	0	2	29	26	+3
(South Africa) 2008	Champions	1	5	3	1	1	39	20	+19
(South Africa) 2009	Third Place	3	4	2	1	1	22	20	+2
(Morocco) 2011	Champions	1	4	4	0	0	23	12	+11
(Morocco) 2013	Champions	1	5	5	0	0	34	17	+17
(Seychelles) 2015	Runners-up	2	5	1	1	3	17	15	+2
(Nigeria) 2016	Champions	1	5	5	0	0	28	10	+18
(Egypt) 2018	Champions	1	5	4	1	0	39	10	+29
(Senegal) 2021	Champions	1	4	4	0	0	15	5	+10
(Mozambique) 2022	Champions	1	5	5	0	0	29	13	+16
(Egypt) 2024	Champions	1	5	4	0	1	22	11	+9
Total	8 titles	11/12	52	42	4	8	297	159	+138
