= 2015 CAF Beach Soccer Championship =

2015 FIFA Beach Soccer World Cup Qualification (CAF)

Tournament details
- Host country: Seychelles
- City: Roche Caiman
- Dates: 14–19 April
- Teams: 8 (from 1 confederation)
- Venue: 1 (in 1 host city)

Final positions
- Champions: Madagascar (1st title)
- Runners-up: Senegal
- Third place: Nigeria
- Fourth place: Ivory Coast

Tournament statistics
- Matches played: 20
- Goals scored: 163 (8.15 per match)
- Top scorer(s): (Ghana) Alexander Adjei (17 goals)
- Best player: (Madagascar) Tokiniaina Francegal Randriamampandry
- Best goalkeeper: (Madagascar) Jhorialy Rafalimanana

The 2015 CAF Beach Soccer Championship, also known as the 2015 Africa Beach Soccer Cup of Nations, was a beach soccer tournament which took place in Roche Caiman, Seychelles on 14–19 April 2015. This was the first time that the CAF Beach Soccer Championship was held in Seychelles. All matches were played at the Roche Caiman Sports Complex.

As well as crowning the best beach soccer nation in Africa, the tournament served as the FIFA Beach Soccer World Cup qualifier for teams from Africa which are members of CAF, where the top two teams qualified for the 2015 FIFA Beach Soccer World Cup in Portugal. In the final, Madagascar defeated Senegal to be crowned champions, and both teams qualified for the 2015 FIFA Beach Soccer World Cup.

== Qualification ==
2015 CAF Beach Soccer Championship qualification
Tournament details
- Dates: 15 February – 29 March 2015
- Teams: 19 (from 1 confederation)

Tournament statistics
- Matches played: 13
- Goals scored: 137 (10.54 per match)

The 2015 CAF Beach Soccer Championship qualifying rounds decided the participating teams of the final tournament.

Qualification ties are played on a home-and-away two-legged basis. If the sides are level on aggregate after the second leg, the away goals rule is applied, and if still level, the tie proceeds directly to a penalty shoot-out (no extra time is played).

=== Entrants ===
A total of 19 teams entered the qualifying rounds.

| Round | Teams entering round | No. of teams |
|---|---|---|
| First round | Cameroon; Djibouti; Kenya; Mali; Mauritius; Mozambique; Sudan; Tanzania; Tunisia; Uganda | 10 |
| Second round | Egypt; Ghana; Ivory Coast; Libya; Madagascar; Morocco; Nigeria; Senegal; South Africa | 9 |
| Final tournament | Seychelles (hosts) | 1 |

=== First round ===
The first legs were scheduled for 13–15 February 2015, and the second legs were scheduled for 20–22 February 2015.

| Team 1 | Agg. | Team 2 | 1st leg | 2nd leg |
|---|---|---|---|---|
| Tunisia | w/o | Mali | — | — |
| Sudan | w/o | Djibouti | — | — |
| Cameroon | w/o | Uganda | — | — |
| Kenya | 9–12 | Tanzania | 3–5 | 6–7 |
| Mauritius | 7–6 | Mozambique | 2–4 | 5–2 |

Note: Tunisia and Cameroon withdrew. Sudan and Djibouti were to play a one-off match in Cairo, Egypt, but Sudan withdrew.

15 February 2015

| Kenya | 3–5 | Tanzania |

Jomo Kenyatta Public Beach, Mombasa
21 February 2015

| Tanzania | 7–6 | Kenya |

Escape One Mikocheni, Dar es Salaam

16 February 2015
16:00 UTC+4

| Mauritius | 2–4 | Mozambique |

Mont Choisy Beach, Grand-Baie
22 February 2015

| Mozambique | 2–5 | Mauritius |

Complexo Matchiki-Tchiki, Maputo

=== Second round ===
The first legs were scheduled for 13–15 March 2015, and the second legs were scheduled for 20–22 March 2015.

The seven winners of the second round qualified for the final tournament, where they were joined by the hosts Seychelles.

| Team 1 | Agg. | Team 2 | 1st leg | 2nd leg |
|---|---|---|---|---|
| Mali | w/o | Senegal | – | – |
| Djibouti | 1–16 | Morocco | — | 1–16 |
| Uganda | 8–21 | Ghana | 6–9 | 2–12 |
| Tanzania | 6–15 | Egypt | 2–6 | 4–9 |
| Mauritius | 6–18 | Ivory Coast | 4–6 | 2–12 |
| Madagascar | 9–3 | South Africa | 5–1 | 4–2 |
| Nigeria | w/o | Libya | — | — |

Note: Libya withdrew. Djibouti and Morocco played a one-off match in Casablanca, Morocco. Madagascar and South Africa played both matches in Durban, South Africa as the beach venue at Mahajanga was rendered unplayable by several days of rain. Mali and Senegal were to play both matches in Dakar, Senegal, but Mali withdrew.

29 March 2015
16:00 UTC+1

| Morocco | 16–1 | Djibouti |

Ain Diab Beach, Casablanca

15 March 2015
16:00 UTC+3

| Uganda | 6–9 | Ghana |

Sports Beach, Entebbe
22 March 2015

| Ghana | 12–2 | Uganda |

La Beach Soccer Arena, Accra

13 March 2015

| Tanzania | 2–6 | Egypt |

Escape One Mikocheni, Dar es Salaam
22 March 2015

| Egypt | 9–4 | Tanzania |

Goal Project Stadium, 6th of October City

14 March 2015
15:00 UTC+4

| Mauritius | 4–6 | Ivory Coast |

Mont Choisy Beach, Grand-Baie
23 March 2015
16:00 UTC±0

| Ivory Coast | 12–2 | Mauritius |

Parc des Sports de Treichville, Abidjan

21 March 2015

| Madagascar | 5–1 | South Africa |

Durban
22 March 2015

| South Africa | 2–4 | Madagascar |

Durban

== Qualified teams and draw ==
The following eight teams qualified for the final tournament.

- Egypt
- Ghana
- Ivory Coast
- Madagascar
- Morocco
- Nigeria
- Senegal
- Seychelles (hosts)

The draw of the tournament was held on 5 April 2015, 16:00 local time (UTC+2), at Cairo. The eight teams were drawn into two groups of four teams, with the following seeding:

| Seeds | Pot A | Pot B | Pot C |
|---|---|---|---|
| Seychelles (assigned to A1); Senegal (assigned to B1) | Nigeria; Morocco | Ivory Coast; Madagascar | Egypt; Ghana |

== Group stage ==
Each team earns three points for a win in regulation time, two points for a win in extra time, one point for a win in a penalty shoot-out, and no points for a defeat.

Legend
The top two teams from each group advance to the semi-finals

All times are local, Seychelles Time (UTC+4).

=== Group A ===
| Pos | Team | Pld | W | WE | WP | L | GF | GA | GD | Pts | Qualification |
|---|---|---|---|---|---|---|---|---|---|---|---|
| 1 | Nigeria | 3 | 2 | 1 | 0 | 0 | 21 | 8 | +13 | 8 | Knockout stage |
| 2 | Ivory Coast | 3 | 1 | 0 | 1 | 1 | 11 | 11 | 0 | 4 | Knockout stage |
| 3 | Egypt | 3 | 1 | 0 | 0 | 2 | 9 | 9 | 0 | 3 | Classification stage (5th place) |
| 4 | Seychelles (H) | 3 | 0 | 0 | 0 | 3 | 4 | 17 | −13 | 0 | Classification stage (5th place) |

Source: CAF
Rules for classification: 1) Points; 2) Points obtained in head-to-head matches; 3) Total goal difference; 4) Total goals scored; 5) Fair play points; 6) Drawing of lots.
(H) Host
14 April 2015
17:30

| Seychelles | 1–10 | Nigeria |
|---|---|---|
| Robin Mathiot 22' | Report 1 Report 2 | Emeka Hego Ogbonna 3', 22'; Isiaka Olawale 6', 20'; Emmanuel Evaware Ohwoferia 14'; Azeez Abu 15', 35'; Adams Taiwo 23'; Ibenegbu Ikechukwu Bartholomew 29'; Victor Sheneni Tale 31' |

Roche Caiman Sports Complex, Roche Caiman
Referee: Driss Lamghaidar (Morocco)
14 April 2015
18:45

| Egypt | 3–3 (a.e.t.) | Ivory Coast |
|---|---|---|
| Ahmed Mohamed Abouserie 3'; Mohamed Gamal Hassan 23'; Moustafa Samir Abdelmoneim 25' | Report 1 Report 2 | N'gnamke Ehanlimbie Didier Kabletchi 24'; Kablan Frederic Aka 26'; N'guessan Daniel Kouassitchi 32' |
Penalties
| Moustafa Shaaban (penalty scored); Ahmed Mohamed Abouserie (penalty missed) | 1–3 | (penalty scored) Brou Bernard Kouadio; (penalty scored) Kablan Frederic Aka; (penalty scored) N'guessan Daniel Kouassitchi |

Roche Caiman Sports Complex, Roche Caiman
Referee: Said Nassur Hachim (Madagascar)

15 April 2015
15:00

| Nigeria | 4–1 | Egypt |
|---|---|---|
| Isiaka Olawale 18'; Azeez Abu 27'; Emeka Hego Ogbonna 29', 32' | Report 1 Report 2 | Ahmed Mohamed Abouserie 34' |

Roche Caiman Sports Complex, Roche Caiman
Referee: Said Nassur Hachim (Madagascar)
15 April 2015
16:15

| Ivory Coast | 2–1 | Seychelles |
|---|---|---|
| Assouan Bile Eric Sidoine Kablan 28'; Brou Bernard Kouadio 33' | Report 1 Report 2 | Jean Paul Marguerite 34' |

Roche Caiman Sports Complex, Roche Caiman
Referee: Youssouph Signate (Senegal)

16 April 2015
15:00

| Seychelles | 2–5 | Egypt |
|---|---|---|
| Michael Cadeau 10'; Robin Mathiot 21' | Report 1 Report 2 | Mohamed Gamal Hassan 2', 15'; Mohamed Fawzy Mohamed 3'; Aly Mohamed Aly 22', 23' |

Roche Caiman Sports Complex, Roche Caiman
Referee: Jelili Ogunmuyiwa (Nigeria)
16 April 2015
16:15

| Nigeria | 7–6 (a.e.t.) | Ivory Coast |
|---|---|---|
| Isiaka Olawale 4', 32'; Ibenegbu Ikechukwu Bartholomew 7'; Azeez Abu 16'; Emeka Hego Ogbonna 26', 39'; Adams Taiwo 34' | Report 1 Report 2 | Eric Tchetche 1'; N'guessan Daniel Kouassitchi 11'; Lacine Diomande 18'; Kablan Frederic Aka 19', 20', 30' |

Roche Caiman Sports Complex, Roche Caiman
Referee: Driss Lamghaidar (Morocco)

=== Group B ===
| Pos | Team | Pld | W | WE | WP | L | GF | GA | GD | Pts | Qualification |
|---|---|---|---|---|---|---|---|---|---|---|---|
| 1 | Madagascar | 3 | 2 | 1 | 0 | 0 | 20 | 11 | +9 | 8 | Knockout stage |
| 2 | Senegal | 3 | 1 | 0 | 0 | 2 | 12 | 11 | +1 | 3 | Knockout stage |
| 3 | Morocco | 3 | 1 | 0 | 0 | 2 | 13 | 18 | −5 | 3 | Classification stage (5th place) |
| 4 | Ghana | 3 | 1 | 0 | 0 | 2 | 12 | 17 | −5 | 3 | Classification stage (5th place) |

Source: CAF
Rules for classification: 1) Points; 2) Points obtained in head-to-head matches; 3) Total goal difference; 4) Total goals scored; 5) Fair play points; 6) Drawing of lots.
14 April 2015
15:00

| Senegal | 7–3 | Morocco |
|---|---|---|
| Pape Amadou Kamara 7', 21', 21', 28'; Hamad Francois Diouf 18'; Babacar Fall 25', 25' | Report 1 Report 2 | Nassim El Hadaoui 30'; Anas El Hadaoui 33'; Kamal El Mahrouk 35' |

Roche Caiman Sports Complex, Roche Caiman
Referee: Jelili Ogunmuyiwa (Nigeria)
14 April 2015
16:15

| Ghana | 4–9 | Madagascar |
|---|---|---|
| Alexander Adjei 2'; Michael Sema Sedziafa 4', 10'; Kofi Aziz 28' | Report 1 Report 2 | Tokiniaina Francegal Randriamampandry 6', 7', 10', 30'; Flavien Razafimahatratra 11', 16', 33'; Ymelda Razafimandimby 25', 31' |

Roche Caiman Sports Complex, Roche Caiman
Referee: Bessem Boubaker (Tunisia)

15 April 2015
17:30

| Morocco | 5–3 | Ghana |
|---|---|---|
| Nassim El Hadaoui 5'; Yacine Benmamma 9', 35'; Kamal El Mahrouk 17'; Anas El Hadaoui 28' | Report 1 Report 2 | Kofi Aziz 4'; Alexander Adjei 13', 16' |

Roche Caiman Sports Complex, Roche Caiman
Referee: Jelili Ogunmuyiwa (Nigeria)
15 April 2015
18:45

| Madagascar | 3–2 (a.e.t.) | Senegal |
|---|---|---|
| Oscar Giovanni 2'; Flavien Razafimahatratra 22'; Tokiniaina Francegal Randriamampandry 38' | Report 1 Report 2 | Vieux Ibra Sahere Thioune 19', 27' |

Roche Caiman Sports Complex, Roche Caiman
Referee: Bessem Boubaker (Tunisia)

16 April 2015
17:30

| Senegal | 3–5 | Ghana |
|---|---|---|
| Pape Amadou Kamara 14'; Hamad Francois Diouf 27'; Babacar Fall 31' | Report 1 Report 2 | Alfred Kwame Torsu 15'; Alexander Adjei 16', 30', 33'; Mohammed Husseini 23' |

Roche Caiman Sports Complex, Roche Caiman
Referee: Issam Bousbih (Tunisia)
16 April 2015
18:45

| Morocco | 5–8 | Madagascar |
|---|---|---|
| Nassim El Hadaoui 3'; Kamal El Mahrouk 4'; Yacine Benmamma 23'; Faicel El Karkouri 33', 35' | Report 1 Report 2 | Oscar Giovanni 1'; Ymelda Razafimandimby 2'; Tianasoa Rabeasimbola 5'; Flavien Razafimahatratra 6', 8', 22'; Tokiniaina Francegal Randriamampandry 24', 29' |

Roche Caiman Sports Complex, Roche Caiman
Referee: Bessem Boubaker (Tunisia)

== Knockout stage ==
=== Bracket ===
Semi-finals
18 April
Nigeria | 3
Senegal (a.e.t.) | 4
18 April
Madagascar (p) | 4 (3)
Ivory Coast | 4 (2)

Final
19 April
Senegal | 1 (1)
Madagascar (p) | 1 (2)
Third place
19 April
Nigeria | 9
Ivory Coast | 1

Fifth Place Semi-finals
18 April
Egypt | 6
Ghana | 5
18 April
Morocco | 5
Seychelles | 1

Fifth Place
19 April
Egypt | 1
Morocco | 3
Seventh Place
19 April
Ghana | 12
Seychelles | 1

=== Fifth place semi-finals ===
18 April 2015
15:00

| Egypt | 6–5 | Ghana |
|---|---|---|
| Mohamed Gamal Hassan 7', 8'; Moustafa Samir Abdelmoneim 23', 35'; Eslam Ahmed Elsayed 26'; Ahmed Mohamed Abouserie 29' | Report 1 Report 2 | Mohammed Husseini 17'; Alexander Adjei 22', 27'; Kofi Aziz 25', 28' |

Roche Caiman Sports Complex, Roche Caiman
Referee: Said Nassur Hachim (Madagascar)
18 April 2015
16:15

| Morocco | 5–1 | Seychelles |
|---|---|---|
| Yacine Benmamma 6'; Ismail El Ouariry 8', 16'; Azzeddine El Hamidy 18', 19' | Report 1 Report 2 | Robin Mathiot 33' |

Roche Caiman Sports Complex, Roche Caiman
Referee: Jelili Ogunmuyiwa (Nigeria)

=== Semi-finals ===
18 April 2015
17:30

| Nigeria | 3–4 (a.e.t.) | Senegal |
|---|---|---|
| Emeka Hego Ogbonna 3'; Azeez Abu 4'; Isiaka Olawale 9' | Report 1 Report 2 | Babacar Fall 2'; Hamad Francois Diouf 8'; Vieux Ibra Sahere Thioune 20', 37' |

Roche Caiman Sports Complex, Roche Caiman
Referee: Bessem Boubaker (Tunisia)
18 April 2015
18:45

| Madagascar | 4–4 (a.e.t.) | Ivory Coast |
|---|---|---|
| Tokiniaina Francegal Randriamampandry 14'; Tianasoa Rabeasimbola 17', 26'; Ymelda Razafimandimby 19' | Report 1 Report 2 | N'guessan Daniel Kouassitchi 9', 20', 34'; Nahounoud Guy Hans Donald Djedjed 13' |
Penalties
| Tokiniaina Francegal Randriamampandry (penalty scored); Tianasoa Rabeasimbola (penalty scored); Flavien Razafimahatratra (penalty missed); Ymelda Razafimandimby (penalty scored) | 3–2 | (penalty missed) Brou Bernard Kouadio; (penalty scored) Lacine Diomande; (penalty scored) N'guessan Daniel Kouassitchi; (penalty missed) Kablan Frederic Aka |

Roche Caiman Sports Complex, Roche Caiman
Referee: Driss Lamghaidar (Morocco)

=== Seventh place match ===
19 April 2015
15:00

| Ghana | 12–1 | Seychelles |
|---|---|---|
| Alexander Adjei 5', 7', 8', 9', 13', 17', 20', 27', 31'; Michael Sema Sedziafa 29', 30'; Alfred Kwame Torsu 34' | Report 1 Report 2 | Rondy Onezime 32' |

Roche Caiman Sports Complex, Roche Caiman
Referee: Hany Farouk El Eraky (Egypt)

=== Fifth place match ===
19 April 2015
16:15

| Egypt | 1–3 | Morocco |
|---|---|---|
| Almoatazbellah Sami Abdelsamie 31' | Report 1 Report 2 | Anas El Hadaoui 13', 35'; Nassim El Hadaoui 36' |

Roche Caiman Sports Complex, Roche Caiman
Referee: Said Nassur Hachim (Madagascar)

=== Third place match ===
19 April 2015
17:30

| Nigeria | 9–1 | Ivory Coast |
|---|---|---|
| Azeez Abu 6', 11', 28'; Emeka Hego Ogbonna 7', 27'; Isiaka Olawale 14'; Ibenegbu Ikechukwu Bartholomew 16', 18'; Lokosa Junior Sewanu 26' | Report 1 Report 2 | Koffi Boris Evin Enan 5' |

Roche Caiman Sports Complex, Roche Caiman
Referee: Issam Bousbih (Tunisia)

=== Final ===
19 April 2015
18:45

| Senegal | 1–1 (a.e.t.) | Madagascar |
|---|---|---|
| Ngalla Sylla 13' | Report 1 Report 2 | Flavien Razafimahatratra 5' |
Penalties
| Babacar Fall (penalty scored); Vieux Ibra Sahere Thioune (penalty missed); Pape Amadou Kamara (penalty missed) | 1–2 | (penalty scored) Tokiniaina Francegal Randriamampandry; (penalty missed) Tianasoa Rabeasimbola; (penalty scored) Flavien Razafimahatratra |

Roche Caiman Sports Complex, Roche Caiman
Referee: Jelili Ogunmuyiwa (Nigeria)

== Final ranking ==
Qualified for 2015 FIFA Beach Soccer World Cup

| Rank | Team |
|---|---|
| 1st place, gold medalist(s) | Madagascar |
| 2nd place, silver medalist(s) | Senegal |
| 3rd place, bronze medalist(s) | Nigeria |
| 4 | Ivory Coast |
| 5 | Morocco |
| 6 | Egypt |
| 7 | Ghana |
| 8 | Seychelles |

== Awards ==
| Best Player (MVP) | Top Scorer(s) | Best Goalkeeper |
|---|---|---|
| (Madagascar) Tokiniaina Francegal Randriamampandry | (Ghana) Alexander Adjei | (Madagascar) Jhorialy Rafalimanana |

== Top goalscorers ==
17 goals

- (Ghana) Alexander Adjei

9 goals

- (Nigeria) Emeka Hego Ogbonna

8 goals

- (Madagascar) Tokiniaina Francegal Randriamampandry
- (Madagascar) Flavien Razafimahatratra
- (Nigeria) Azeez Abu

7 goals

- (Nigeria) Isiaka Olawale

5 goals

- (Egypt) Mohamed Gamal Hassan
- (Ivory Coast) N'guessan Daniel Kouassitchi
- (Senegal) Pape Amadou Kamara
