= 2016 Beach Soccer Africa Cup of Nations =

2016 Africa Beach Soccer Cup of Nations

Tournament details
- Host country: Nigeria
- City: Lagos
- Dates: 13–18 December
- Teams: 8 (from 1 confederation)
- Venue: 1 (in 1 host city)

Final positions
- Champions: Senegal (1st title)
- Runners-up: Nigeria
- Third place: Egypt
- Fourth place: Morocco

Tournament statistics
- Matches played: 18
- Goals scored: 138 (7.67 per match)
- Top scorer: (Senegal) Babacar Fall (10 goals)
- Best player: (Nigeria) Emeka Ogbonna
- Best goalkeeper: (Senegal) Al Seyni Ndiaye

The 2016 Africa Beach Soccer Cup of Nations, also known as the 2016 CAF Beach Soccer Championship, was a beach soccer tournament which took place in Lagos, Nigeria in December, to determine the best beach soccer nation in Africa and doubles as a qualification event for the 2017 FIFA Beach Soccer World Cup, with the two finalists progressing to the finals in the Bahamas. This was the first time that the tournament is held in Nigeria.

== Qualification ==
2016 Africa Beach Soccer Cup of Nations qualification
Tournament details
- Dates: 26 August – 18 September 2016
- Teams: 14 (from 1 confederation)

Tournament statistics
- Matches played: 8
- Goals scored: 71 (8.88 per match)

The 2016 Africa Beach Soccer Cup of Nations qualifying rounds decide the participating teams of the final tournament.

Due to being just 14 teams in qualifying compared to 19 at the previous edition, there was only one round of qualifiers this year where seven teams emerged to join host Nigeria for the final tournament.

Qualification ties are played on a home-and-away, two-legged basis. If the sides are level on aggregate after the second leg, the away goals rule is applied, and if still level, the tie proceeds directly to a penalty shoot-out (no extra time is played).

=== Entrants ===
| Round | Teams entering round | No. of teams |
|---|---|---|
| Qualification | Cape Verde; Egypt; Ghana; Ivory Coast; Liberia; Libya; Kenya; Madagascar; Morocco; Mozambique; Senegal; Sudan; Tanzania; Uganda | 14 |
| Final tournament | Nigeria (hosts) | 1 |

=== Matches ===
The first legs were scheduled for 26–28 August 2016, and the second legs were scheduled for 16–18 September 2016.

| Team 1 | Agg. | Team 2 | 1st leg | 2nd leg |
|---|---|---|---|---|
| Cape Verde | 4–12 | Senegal | 2–7 | 2–5 |
| Uganda | w/o | Egypt | – | – |
| Liberia | w/o | Morocco | – | – |
| Tanzania | 7–13 | Ivory Coast | 3–7 | 4–6 |
| Kenya | 4–17 | Ghana | 3–10 | 1–7 |
| Mozambique | 4–9 | Madagascar | 2–3 | 2–6 |
| Sudan | w/o | Libya | – | – |

Note: Uganda, Liberia and Sudan withdrew.

== Qualified teams and draw ==
The following eight teams qualified for the final tournament.

- Egypt
- Ghana
- Ivory Coast
- Libya
- Madagascar
- Morocco
- Nigeria (hosts)
- Senegal

The draw for the final tournament of the competition took place on 24 September 2016, 16:00 UTC+2, at the CAF headquarters in Cairo, Egypt. The eight teams were drawn into two groups of four. For the draw, the hosts Nigeria are seeded in position A1 and the defending champions Madagascar were seeded in position B1. The remaining six teams were seeded based on their results in the 2015 CAF Beach Soccer Championship.

| Pot 1 | Pot 2 | Pot 3 | Pot 4 |
|---|---|---|---|
| Nigeria (position A1); Madagascar (position B1) | Senegal; Ivory Coast | Morocco; Egypt | Ghana; Libya |

== Group stage ==
Each team earns three points for a win in regulation time, two points for a win in extra time, one point for a win in a penalty shoot-out, and no points for a defeat. The top two teams from each group advance to the semi-finals.

All times are local, WAT (UTC+1).

=== Group A ===
| Pos | Team | Pld | W | W+ | WP | L | GF | GA | GD | Pts | Qualification |
|---|---|---|---|---|---|---|---|---|---|---|---|
| 1 | Nigeria (H) | 3 | 2 | 0 | 0 | 1 | 11 | 9 | +2 | 6 | Knockout stage |
| 2 | Egypt | 3 | 2 | 0 | 0 | 1 | 11 | 9 | +2 | 6 | Knockout stage |
| 3 | Ivory Coast | 3 | 1 | 0 | 1 | 1 | 11 | 8 | +3 | 4 | Placement stage (5th–8th place) |
| 4 | Ghana | 3 | 0 | 0 | 0 | 3 | 7 | 14 | −7 | 0 | Placement stage (5th–8th place) |

Source: CAF
(H) Host
13 December 2016
18:45

| Ghana | 0–5 | Ivory Coast |
|---|---|---|
| | Report | Aka 12'; Djedjed 12'; Gbagra 16'; Kablan 28'; Djimi 32' |

Eko Atlantic, Lagos
Referee: Mbokh Beye (Senegal)
13 December 2016
20:00

| Nigeria | 3–2 | Egypt |
|---|---|---|
| Olawale 12'; Emeka 16', 31' | Report | Mohamed 18'; Abo 23' |

Eko Atlantic, Lagos
Referee: Said Nassur Hachim (Madagascar)

14 December 2016
17:30

| Egypt | 5–4 | Ghana |
|---|---|---|
| Abo 11', 13'; M. Samir 22'; Mohamed 23', 36' | Report | Osa 9'; Husseini 11'; Semabia 17'; Kofi 30' |

Eko Atlantic, Lagos
Referee: Yahya Abdel Ghani (Libya)
14 December 2016
20:00

| Ivory Coast | 4–4 (a.e.t.) | Nigeria |
|---|---|---|
| Kouadio 9'; Kablan 14', 28'; Aka 36' | Report | Abu 3', 31'; Tale 23', 36' |
Penalties
| Djimi (penalty scored); Gbagra (penalty scored); Daniel (penalty scored) | 3–1 | (penalty missed) Tale; (penalty scored) Obodo |

Eko Atlantic, Lagos
Referee: Said Nassur Hachim (Madagascar)

15 December 2016
17:30

| Egypt | 4–2 | Ivory Coast |
|---|---|---|
| Mohamed 4', 30'; Mizo 15'; Abo 29' | Report | Aka 6', 28' |

Eko Atlantic, Lagos
Referee: Said Nassur Hachim (Madagascar)
15 December 2016
20:00

| Nigeria | 4–3 | Ghana |
|---|---|---|
| Emeka 28', 29'; Obodo 33'; Tale 35' | Report | Husseini 28'; Adjei 29'; Osa 33' |

Eko Atlantic, Lagos
Referee: Issam Bousbih (Tunisia)

=== Group B ===
| Pos | Team | Pld | W | W+ | WP | L | GF | GA | GD | Pts | Qualification |
|---|---|---|---|---|---|---|---|---|---|---|---|
| 1 | Senegal | 3 | 3 | 0 | 0 | 0 | 15 | 4 | +11 | 9 | Knockout stage |
| 2 | Morocco | 3 | 2 | 0 | 0 | 1 | 12 | 6 | +6 | 6 | Knockout stage |
| 3 | Madagascar | 3 | 1 | 0 | 0 | 2 | 11 | 10 | +1 | 3 | Placement stage (5th–8th place) |
| 4 | Libya | 3 | 0 | 0 | 0 | 3 | 10 | 28 | −18 | 0 | Placement stage (5th–8th place) |

Source: CAF
13 December 2016
16:15

| Madagascar | 9–5 | Libya |
|---|---|---|
| Enidiel (?); Ymelda (?); Toki (?); Flavien (?); Christian (?); Pierralit (?); Rufin (?) | Report | Tariq (?); Zuheir (?) |

Eko Atlantic, Lagos
Referee: Hany Farouk El Eraky (Egypt)
13 December 2016
17:30

| Morocco | 1–2 | Senegal |
|---|---|---|
| Nassim 36' | Report | Fall 29', 36' |

Eko Atlantic, Lagos
Referee: Jelili Ogunmuyiwa (Nigeria)

14 December 2016
16:15

| Libya | 3–9 | Morocco |
|---|---|---|
| Esam 1'; Hany 3'; Tariq 17' | Report | Nassim 3'; El Hadaoui 5', 26'; El Karkouri 7'; El Ouariry 13'; Iazal 23', 35'; Nassim 29', 30' |

Eko Atlantic, Lagos
Referee: Issam Bousbih (Tunisia)
14 December 2016
18:45

| Senegal | 3–1 | Madagascar |
|---|---|---|
| Fall 3', 7', 26' | Report | Toky 19' |

Eko Atlantic, Lagos
Referee: Jelili Ogunmuyiwa (Nigeria)

15 December 2016
16:15

| Libya | 2–10 | Senegal |
|---|---|---|
| Zuheir 13'; Jilwal 23' | Report | Diassy 2', 6', 17', 19'; Sylla 18', 36'; Faye 21'; Fall 29'; Thioune 33'; Barry 36' |

Eko Atlantic, Lagos
Referee: Sani Mohammed (Nigeria)
15 December 2016
18:45

| Madagascar | 1–2 | Morocco |
|---|---|---|
| Ymelda 24' | Report | Nassim 15'; Benmamma 18' |

Eko Atlantic, Lagos
Referee: Wael Mostafa El Sabagh (Egypt)

== Placement stage (5th–8th place) ==
=== Bracket (5th–8th place) ===
Libya withdrew from the placement stage due to administrative reasons.

5th place semi-finals
17 December
Ivory Coast (w/o) | —
Libya | —
17 December
Ghana | 4
Madagascar | 8

5th place
18 December
Ivory Coast | 3
Madagascar | 4
7th place
18 December
Libya | —
Ghana (w/o) | —

=== Fifth place semi-finals ===
17 December 2016
16:15

| Ivory Coast | Cancelled | Libya |
|---|---|---|
| | Report |

Eko Atlantic, Lagos
Referee: Wael Mostafa El Sabagh (Egypt)
17 December 2016
17:30

| Ghana | 4–8 | Madagascar |
|---|---|---|
| Kofi 2', 23'; Adjei 34', 35' | Report | Toky 2', 19', 25'; Marcel 7'; Rufin 15'; Flavien 24'; Giovanni 36'; Del 36' |

Eko Atlantic, Lagos
Referee: Ivan Bayige Kintu (Uganda)

=== Seventh place match ===
18 December 2016
16:15

| Libya | Cancelled | Ghana |
|---|---|---|
| | Report |

Eko Atlantic, Lagos

=== Fifth place match ===
18 December 2016
17:30

| Ivory Coast | 3–4 | Madagascar |
|---|---|---|
| Djimi (?); Aka (?) | Report | Flavien (?); Enidiel (?); Pierralit (?) |

Eko Atlantic, Lagos
Referee: Wael Mostafa El Sabagh (Egypt)

== Knockout stage ==
=== Bracket (1st–4th place) ===
Semi-finals
17 December
Nigeria | 6
Morocco | 1
17 December
Egypt | 2
Senegal | 5

Final
18 December
Nigeria | 4
Senegal | 8
3rd place
18 December
Morocco | 1
Egypt | 4

=== Semi-finals ===
Winners qualify for 2017 FIFA Beach Soccer World Cup.

17 December 2016
18:45

| Egypt | 2–5 | Senegal |
|---|---|---|
| M. Samir 11'; Mizo 20' | Report | Faye 17'; Fall 23', 31'; Sylla 31'; Diassy 33' |

Eko Atlantic, Lagos
Referee: Jelili Ogunmuyiwa (Nigeria)
17 December 2016
20:00

| Nigeria | 6–1 | Morocco |
|---|---|---|
| Emmanuel 8'; Abu 18', 30'; Ogodo 20'; Emeka 27'; Emmanuel 29' | Report | Nassim 15' |

Eko Atlantic, Lagos
Referee: Said Nassur Hachim (Madagascar)

=== Third place match ===
18 December 2016
18:45

| Morocco | 1–4 | Egypt |
|---|---|---|
| Iazal 23' | Report | Hassan 5', 16'; Samir 8'; Mohamed 23' |

Eko Atlantic, Lagos
Referee: Yahya Abdel Ghani (Libya)

=== Final ===
18 December 2016
20:00

| Nigeria | 4–8 | Senegal |
|---|---|---|
| Olawale 4'; Ogodo 7', 20'; Emeka 12' | Report | Fall 4', 33'; Sylla 10', 25', 34'; Barry 16'; Diassy 17'; Diouf 35' |

Eko Atlantic, Lagos
Referee: Said Nassur Hachim (Madagascar)

== Awards ==
=== Winners ===
2016 Africa Beach Soccer
Cup of Nations champions

Senegal
Fourth title

=== Individual awards ===
The following awards were given at the conclusion of the tournament.

Most valuable player
(Nigeria) Emeka Ogbonna
Top scorer
(Senegal) Babacar Fall (10 goals)
Best goalkeeper
(Senegal) Al Seyni Ndiaye

== Final ranking ==
Qualified for the 2017 FIFA Beach Soccer World Cup

| Rank | Team |
|---|---|
| 1st place, gold medalist(s) | Senegal |
| 2nd place, silver medalist(s) | Nigeria |
| 3rd place, bronze medalist(s) | Egypt |
| 4 | Morocco |
| 5 | Madagascar |
| 6 | Ivory Coast |
| 7 | Ghana |
| 8 | Libya |

=== Qualified teams for FIFA Beach Soccer World Cup ===
The following two teams from CAF qualified for the 2017 FIFA Beach Soccer World Cup.

| Team | Qualified on | Previous appearances in tournament^{1} only FIFA-sanctioned era (since 2005) |
|---|---|---|
| Senegal | 17 December 2016 | 5 (2007, 2008, 2011, 2013, 2015) |
| Nigeria | 17 December 2016 | 4 (2006, 2007, 2009, 2011) |

^{1} Bold indicates champion for that year. Italic indicates host for that year.
