= 2013 CAF Beach Soccer Championship =

2013 FIFA Beach Soccer World Cup Qualification (CAF)
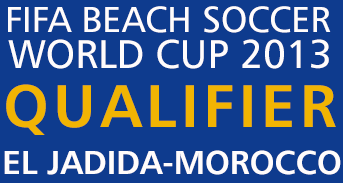

Tournament details
- Host country: Morocco
- Dates: 22–26 May
- Teams: 8 (from 1 confederation)
- Venue(s): 1 (in 1 host city)

Final positions
- Champions: Senegal (3rd title)
- Runners-up: Côte d'Ivoire
- Third place: Morocco
- Fourth place: Nigeria

Tournament statistics
- Matches played: 16
- Goals scored: 160 (10 per match)
- Top scorer(s): (Nigeria) Azeez Abu (12 goals)
- Best player(s): (Morocco) Nassim El Hadaoui
- Best goalkeeper: (Senegal) El Seyni Ndiaye

The 2013 CAF Beach Soccer Championship took place from 22 May to 26 May 2013, in El Jadida, Morocco, for the first time. It is the second time in Morocco, following Casablanca hosting the previous qualification tournament in 2011. It was originally scheduled for 10–14 April and then for 29 May - 2 June 2013. The two finalists of the championship qualified for the 2013 World Cup and went on to represent Africa in Tahiti in September.

All matches were held at the Mazagan Beach Resort in El Jadida.

== Participating teams ==
Eight teams have confirmed their participation in the competition:

- Côte d'Ivoire
- Egypt
- Ghana
- Libya
- Madagascar
- Morocco
- Nigeria
- Senegal

There was to have been a team from Uganda taking part in the tournament, but they were forced to withdraw due to a lack of funding.

== Draw ==
The draw to divide the eight teams into two groups of four and the determination of the subsequent schedule was held at the Mazagan Beach Resort in El Jadida.

== Group stage ==
All match times are correct to that of local time in El Jadida, being Western European Summer Time, (UTC +1).

=== Group A ===
Team	Pld	W	W+	L	GF	GA	GD	Pts
Senegal	3	3	0	0	21	8	+13	9
Morocco	3	2	0	1	17	8	+9	6
Madagascar	3	1	0	2	16	16	0	3
Ghana	3	0	0	3	8	30	-22	0

22 May 2013
16:45

Senegal	7 - 3	Madagascar
B. Fall 4'; N. Sylla 14', 23'; P. Koukpaki 28', 31'; M. Sylla 31'; C. Ba 33'	Report	11' G. Oscar; 35' T. Rabehasimbola; 35' D. Fabrice

Mazagan Beach Resort, El Jadida

22 May 2013
19:15

Ghana	2 - 9	Morocco
D. Sapper 5'; J. Lawer 26'	Report	5', 23', 34' N. El Hadaoui; 12' N. Boulakouabaa; 12', 14' A. El Hadaoui; 14' A. El Hamidy; 18' Gio; 26' Brigel

Mazagan Beach Resort, El Jadida

23 May 2013
16:45

Senegal	11 - 3	Ghana
N. Sylla 1', 1', 5'; P. Koukpaki 2', 21'; C. Ba 15', 33'; S. Thioub 15', 25'; P. Ndour 18'; B. Fall 35'	Report	1', 17' N. Lamptey; 23' J. Lawer

Mazagan Beach Resort, El Jadida

23 May 2013
19:15

Morocco	6 - 3	Madagascar
N. Boulakouabaa 4'; Brigel 6'; N. El Hadaoui 16', 32', 34'; A. El Hamidy 19'	Report	21', 25' T. Rabehasimbola; 32' Bernardin

Mazagan Beach Resort, El Jadida

24 May 2013
12:45

Madagascar	10 - 3	Ghana
G. Oscar 5'; Bernardin 11'; Flavien 16'; Anderson 24', 30'; T. Rabehasimbola 31', 31', 33', 34', 36'	Report	14', 31' Kofi; 18' D. Sapper

Mazagan Beach Resort, El Jadida

24 May 2013
15:15

Morocco	2 - 3	Senegal
B. Esaadi 6'; Brigel 10'	Report	1' P. Koukpaki; 14' N. Sylla; 15' C. Ba

Mazagan Beach Resort, El Jadida

=== Group B ===
Team	Pld	W	W+	L	GF	GA	GD	Pts
Côte d'Ivoire	3	3	0	0	14	9	+5	9
Nigeria	3	2	0	1	20	13	+7	6
Egypt	3	1	0	2	13	15	-2	3
Libya	3	0	0	3	11	21	-10	0

22 May 2013
15:30

Côte d'Ivoire	4 - 1	Egypt
Sakanoto 4'; David 12', 14'; Aka 22'	Report	19' Aly

Mazagan Beach Resort, El Jadida

22 May 2013
18:00

Libya	4 - 8	Nigeria
Hani 15'; Shushan 15', 33'; Kharif 26'	Report	1' E. Kyande; 3', 3', 21' I. Olawale; 9', 23', 29' E. Ogbonnaya; 35' A. Abu

Mazagan Beach Resort, El Jadida

23 May 2013
15:30

Côte d'Ivoire	5 - 4	Libya
David 10'; Dago 19'; Sakanoko 27', 28'; Ludovic 35'	Report	1' Hani; 2', 4' Howssein; 12' Mohammed

Mazagan Beach Resort, El Jadida

23 May 2013
18:00

Nigeria	8 - 4	Egypt
B. Badmus 11', 19'; A. Abu 13' 21', 26'; I. Olawale 23', 23', 26'	Report	22' El Agouz; 26', 33' Aly; 31' Osman

Mazagan Beach Resort, El Jadida

24 May 2013
11:30

Nigeria	4 - 5	Côte d'Ivoire
B. Badmus 17'; E. Ogbonnaya 18'; A. Abu 19', 27'	Report	15', 18', 30' Sakanoto; 28', 36' David

Mazagan Beach Resort, El Jadida

24 May 2013
14:00

Egypt	8 - 3	Libya
Abo Serie 3', 10', 20'; Aly 14', 14', 25'; Osman 32'; Sayed 36'	Report	3' Bdiri; 29', 36' Mohammed

Mazagan Beach Resort, El Jadida

== Knockout stage ==
Semi-finals
A1	Senegal	9
B2	Nigeria	8
B1	Côte d'Ivoire	5
A2	Morocco	4

Final
SF1	Senegal	4
SF2	Côte d'Ivoire	1
3rd/4th Place match
SF1	Nigeria	2
SF2	Morocco	7

=== Semifinals ===
25 May 2013
17:00

Senegal	9 - 8	Nigeria
N. Sylla 8', 16'; P. Koukpaki 10', 23'; C. Ba 12', 30', 33'; B. Fall 13', 19'	Report	11' E. Ogbonnaya; 15', 24', 26', 36' A. Abu; 20', 23', 33' V. Tale

Mazagan Beach Resort, El Jadida

25 May 2013
18:15

Côte d'Ivoire	5 - 4	Morocco
	Report

Mazagan Beach Resort, El Jadida

=== Third Place ===
26 May 2013
17:00

Nigeria	2 - 7	Morocco
A. Abu 15', 16'	Report	2' Brigel; 9', 28' N. El Hadaoui; 11', 19', 30' A. El Hadaoui; 36' A. Lahmidi

Mazagan Beach Resort, El Jadida

=== Final ===
26 May 2013
18:15

Senegal	4 - 1	Côte d'Ivoire
	Report

Mazagan Beach Resort, El Jadida

== Winners ==
(2013) FIFA Beach Soccer World Cup
Qualification (CAF) Winners:

Senegal
third title

== Awards ==
Best Player (MVP)
(Morocco) Nassim El Hadaoui
Top Scorer
(Nigeria) Azeez Abu
12 goals
Best Goalkeeper
(Senegal) El Seyni Ndiaye

== Teams Qualifying ==
	Team
1st Place	Senegal
2nd Place	Côte d'Ivoire

== Final Placement ==
Rank	Team
1	Senegal
2	Côte d'Ivoire
3	Morocco
4	Nigeria
5	Madagascar
6	Egypt
7	Libya
8	Ghana
