= Ghana national beach soccer team =

National sports team

Ghana
- Nickname: Black Sharks
- Association: Ghana Football Association
- Confederation: CAF (Africa)
- Head coach: Daniel Kotey
- FIFA code: GHA
- BSWW ranking: 61 ▲1 (6 May 2026)
First colours
Second colours

CAF Beach Soccer Championship
- Appearances: 3 (first in 2013)
- Best result: 7th Place (2015, 2016)

The Ghana national beach soccer team represents Ghana in international beach soccer competitions and is controlled by the Ghana Football Association, the governing body for football in Ghana. The team is nicknamed the Black Sharks.

== Achievements ==
- CAF Beach Soccer Championship Best: seventh place
  - 2015, 2016
