= Uganda national beach soccer team =

National sports team

Uganda
- Nickname: Uganda Sand Cranes
- Association: Federation of Uganda Football Associations
- Confederation: CAF (Africa)
- Head coach: Kebba Haruna
- Captain: Tekkwo Derrick
- Most caps: 3
- FIFA code: UGA
- BSWW ranking: 79 ▲1 (2 September 2026)

First international
- Zanzibar 5 – 6 Uganda (Zanzibar, Zanzibar; 7 December 2014)

Biggest win
- Kenya 6 – 7 Uganda (Mombasa, Mombasa; 1 February 2015); Tanzania 6 – 7 Uganda (Saly, Saly; 24 May 2021)

Biggest defeat
- Ghana 12 – 2 Uganda (Accra, Ghana; 22 March 2015)

The Uganda national beach soccer team represents Uganda in international beach soccer competitions and is controlled by the FUFA, the governing body for football in Uganda. The Uganda national beach soccer team played their first game in an international friendly match in December 2014, winning 6–5 to Zanzibar Sand Heroes. Their second win came in the 2015 February 1 in the next friendly match against Kenya Sand Heroes in Mombasa, in which Uganda won against the hosts 7–6.

== Current squad ==
Correct as of 2015

Note: Flags indicate national team as defined under FIFA eligibility rules; some limited exceptions apply. Players may hold more than one non-FIFA nationality.

No.	Pos.	Nation	Player
1	GK	UGA	Ashadu Bugembe
2	DF	UGA	Kasujja Davis
3	DF	UGA	Naturinda Ambrose Sanyu
4	DF	UGA	Muganga Douglas
5	MF	UGA	Somoka Rowch Peter
6	MF	UGA	Revita Jonh

No.	Pos.	Nation	Player
7	MF	UGA	Semakula Hamim
10	DF	UGA	Tekkwo Derrick
9	FW	UGA	Nkuubi Brian
10	FW	UGA	Lukooya Baker
18	FW	UGA	Lwezawula Phillip
11	GK	UGA	Bunkeddeko Ali

Coach: Kebba Haruna

== Current staff ==
- Head of Delegation: Abdul Hamid Juma
