= Egypt national beach soccer team =

Egypt
- Association: Egyptian Football Association
- Confederation: CAF (Africa)
- Head coach: Moustafa Ziedan
- FIFA code: EGY
- BSWW ranking: 24 ▲2 (2 September 2026)
First colours
Second colours

First international
- South Africa 3–4 Egypt (Durban, South Africa; 26 September 2006

Biggest win
- Seychelles 2–12 Egypt (Saly, Senegal; 25 May 2021)

Biggest defeat
- Brazil 11–3 Egypt (Dubai, UAE; 31 October 2017)

World Cup
- Appearances: 1 (first in 2024)
- Best result: Group Stage

The Egypt national beach soccer team represents Egypt in international beach soccer competitions and is controlled by the Egyptian Football Association, the governing body for football in Egypt.

Its best performance in the Africa Cup of Nations is runners-up in 2022. It has qualified for one World Cup, the 2024 tournament.

== Awards ==
=== Movers of the Month ===
- September 2015
- November 2015

== Achievements ==
=== FIFA Beach Soccer World Cup ===
- 2024 – Group stage

=== Beach Soccer Africa Cup of Nations ===
- 2006 – (bronze)
- 2007 – Fifth Place
- 2008 – Fourth Place
- 2009 – Fourth Place
- 2011 – (bronze)
- 2013 – Sixth Place
- 2015 – Sixth Place
- 2016 – (bronze)
- 2018 – (bronze)
- 2021 – Fifth Place
- 2022 – (silver)
- 2024 – Fourth Place

=== Arab Beach Soccer Cup ===
- 2008 – (bronze)
- 2010 – Fourth Place
- 2014 – (gold)
- 2023 – (gold)
- 2026 – Semi final

=== Beach Soccer Intercontinental Cup ===
- 2015 – Fourth Place
- 2016 – Sixth Place
- 2017 – Sixth Place
- 2018 – Fourth Place
- 2019 – Sixth Place

=== Neom Beach Soccer Cup ===
- 2019 – (silver)

=== Beach soccer at the Mediterranean Beach Games ===
- 2015 – (silver)
- 2023 – Fourth Place

=== Beach soccer at the CIS Games ===
- 2023 – Sixth Place

=== Sharm El-Sheikh International Beach Soccer Championship ===
- 2015 – (silver)
- 2016 – (bronze)

=== Casablanca Beach Soccer Tournament ===
- 2022 – (gold)

=== El Jadida Beach Soccer Tournament ===
- 2016 – (silver)

=== Muscat Beach Soccer Cup ===
- 2010 – (gold)

=== Oman Beach Soccer Cup ===
- 2024 – (silver)

=== COSAFA Beach Soccer Championship ===
- 2022 – (silver)
