= Ivory Coast national beach soccer team =

National sports team

Ivory Coast
- Association: Ivorian Football Federation
- Confederation: CAF (Africa)
- Head coach: Lohognon Soro
- FIFA code: CIV
- BSWW ranking: 90 ▼2 (2 June 2025)
First colours
Second colours

The Ivory Coast national beach soccer team represents Ivory Coast in international beach soccer competitions and is controlled by the Ivorian Football Federation, the governing body for football in Ivory Coast.

== Current squad ==
Correct as of September 2013:

Note: Flags indicate national team as defined under FIFA eligibility rules; some limited exceptions apply. Players may hold more than one non-FIFA nationality.

No.	Pos.	Nation	Player
1	GK		Yaya Bakayoko
2	FW		Landry Djimi
3	DF		Isaac Beda
4	FW		Guy Djedjed
5	DF		Lacine Diomande
6	DF		Mamadou Diarrassouba

No.	Pos.	Nation	Player
7	FW		Bile Kablan
8	FW		Moustapha Sakanoko
9	FW		Kouassitchi Daniel
10	FW		Thierry Bahi
11	FW		Eric Tchetche
12	GK		Armand Kouadio

Coach: Lohognon Soro

== Achievements ==
- FIFA Beach Soccer World Cup Best: Eleventh place
  - 2009
- CAF Beach Soccer Championship Best: Runners-up
  - 2009
