= Beach Soccer Africa Cup of Nations =

African qualification tournament for the FIFA Beach Soccer World Cup

- Organiser(s): CAF
- Founded: 2015; 11 years ago
- Region: Africa
- Teams: 8 (main tournament); Qualification numbers vary
- Qualifier for: FIFA Beach Soccer World Cup
- Current champions: Senegal (5th title)
- Most championships: Senegal (5 titles)
- Website: Official website
- 2026 Beach Soccer Africa Cup of Nations

The Beach Soccer Africa Cup of Nations (BSAFCON) is the beach soccer tournament of Africa, organized by the Confederation of African Football (CAF). Launched in 2015, the winners of each edition qualifies for African nations to the upcoming FIFA Beach Soccer World Cup. Before 2015, African nations competed in separate African qualifying tournaments for the FIFA Beach Soccer World Cup.

Senegal is the most successful nation in this competition and in World Cup qualifications, having won five titles, including the latest one in 2024, and qualified nine out of eleven attempts; Nigeria follow close behind, with six qualifications.

The current champions are Senegal having defeated Mauritania in the 2024 Final, claiming their fifth title.

== History ==
In 2006, FIFA made it a requirement for all confederations to begin holding qualification tournaments to determine the best national team(s) in their region and hence those who would proceed to represent their continent in the upcoming World Cup (previously, nations were simply invited to play without having to earn their place). FIFA currently allocate Africa two berths at the World Cup and hence the top two teams (the winners and the runners-up) qualify to the World Cup finals.

Beach Soccer Worldwide (BSWW) originally organized the competition under the title FIFA Beach Soccer World Cup CAF qualifier (also known informally as the CAF Beach Soccer Championship). Despite historically having minimal input (often only sending delegates), CAF became lead organizers in 2015, establishing a qualification phase to determine the eight nations to compete in the main tournament. On 6 August 2015, CAF renamed the competition as the "Beach Soccer Africa Cup Of Nations". CAF later announced that since three of its competitions were already held in odd-numbered years, the tournament would now be held in even-numbered years henceforth to desaturate the calendar, starting with 2016.

== Results ==
For all editions of this tournament, the top two teams qualified for the FIFA Beach Soccer World Cup.

=== FIFA Beach Soccer World Cup qualifier ===
| # | Year | Location | Final | | | Third place play-off | | | Teams |
| # | Year | Location | Champions | Score | Runners-up | Third place | Score | Fourth place | Teams |
FIFA Beach Soccer World Cup CAF qualifier (CAF Beach Soccer Championship)
| 1 | 2006 details | Durban, South Africa | Cameroon | 5–3 | Nigeria | Egypt | 8–3 | Ivory Coast | 6 |
| 2 | 2007 details | Durban, South Africa | Nigeria | 6–5 | Senegal | Ivory Coast | 2–0 | South Africa | 8 |
| 3 | 2008 details | Durban, South Africa | Senegal | 12–6 | Cameroon | Ivory Coast | 6–3 | Egypt | 8 |
| 4 | 2009 details | Durban, South Africa | Nigeria | 7–4 | Ivory Coast | Senegal | 6–4 | Egypt | 9 |
| 5 | 2011 details | Casablanca, Morocco | Senegal | 7–4 | Nigeria | Egypt | 4–4 (a.e.t.) (1–0 p.) | Madagascar | 9 |
| 6 | 2013 details | El Jadida, Morocco | Senegal | 4–1 | Ivory Coast | Morocco | 7–2 | Nigeria | 8 |

=== Beach Soccer Africa Cup of Nations ===
| # | Year | Location | Final | | | Third place play-off | | | Teams |
| # | Year | Location | Champions | Score | Runners-up | Third place | Score | Fourth place | Teams |
Beach Soccer Africa Cup of Nations
| 1 | 2015 details | Roche Caiman, Seychelles | Madagascar | 1–1 (a.e.t.) (2–1 p.) | Senegal | Nigeria | 9–1 | Ivory Coast | 8 |
| 2 | 2016 details | Lagos, Nigeria | Senegal | 8–4 | Nigeria | Egypt | 4–1 | Morocco | 8 |
| 3 | 2018 details | Sharm El Sheikh, Egypt | Senegal | 6–1 | Nigeria | Egypt | 3–2 | Morocco | 8 |
| 4 | 2021 (Note: Originally scheduled for 2020. Delayed until 2021 due to the COVID-19 pandemic.) details | Saly, Senegal | Senegal | 4–1 | Mozambique | Morocco | 5–3 | Uganda | 7 |
| 5 | 2022 details | Vilankulo, Mozambique | Senegal | 2–2 (a.e.t.) (6–5 p.) | Egypt | Morocco | 6–4 | Mozambique | 8 |
| 6 | 2024 details | Hurghada, Egypt | Senegal | 6–1 | Mauritania | Morocco | 4–3 | Egypt | 8 |
| 7 | 2026 details | Senegal | | | | | | | 8 |

== Medals (2015-2024) ==
| Rank | Nation | Gold | Silver | Bronze | Total |
|---|---|---|---|---|---|
| 1 | Senegal (SEN) | 5 | 1 | 0 | 6 |
| 2 | Madagascar (MAD) | 1 | 0 | 0 | 1 |
| 3 | Nigeria (NGR) | 0 | 2 | 1 | 3 |
| 4 | Egypt (EGY) | 0 | 1 | 2 | 3 |
| 5 | Mauritania (MRT) | 0 | 1 | 0 | 1 |
| 5 | Mozambique (MOZ) | 0 | 1 | 0 | 1 |
| 7 | Morocco (MAR) | 0 | 0 | 3 | 3 |
| Totals (7 entries) | | 6 | 6 | 6 | 18 |

== Successful nations ==
| Team | Titles | Runners-up | Third place | Fourth place | Total |
|---|---|---|---|---|---|
| Senegal | 5 (2016, 2018, 2021*, 2022, 2024) | 1 (2015) | – | – | 6 |
| Madagascar | 1 (2015) | – | – | – | 1 |
| Nigeria | – | 2 (2016*, 2018) | 1 (2015) | | 3 |
| Egypt | – | 1 (2022) | 2 (2016, 2018*) | 1 (2024*) | 4 |
| Mozambique | – | 1 (2021*) | – | 1 (2022) | 2 |
| Mauritania | – | 1 (2024) | – | – | 1 |
| Morocco | – | – | 3 (2021, 2022, 2024) | 2 (2016, 2018) | 5 |

* Hosts

== Awards ==
=== By category ===
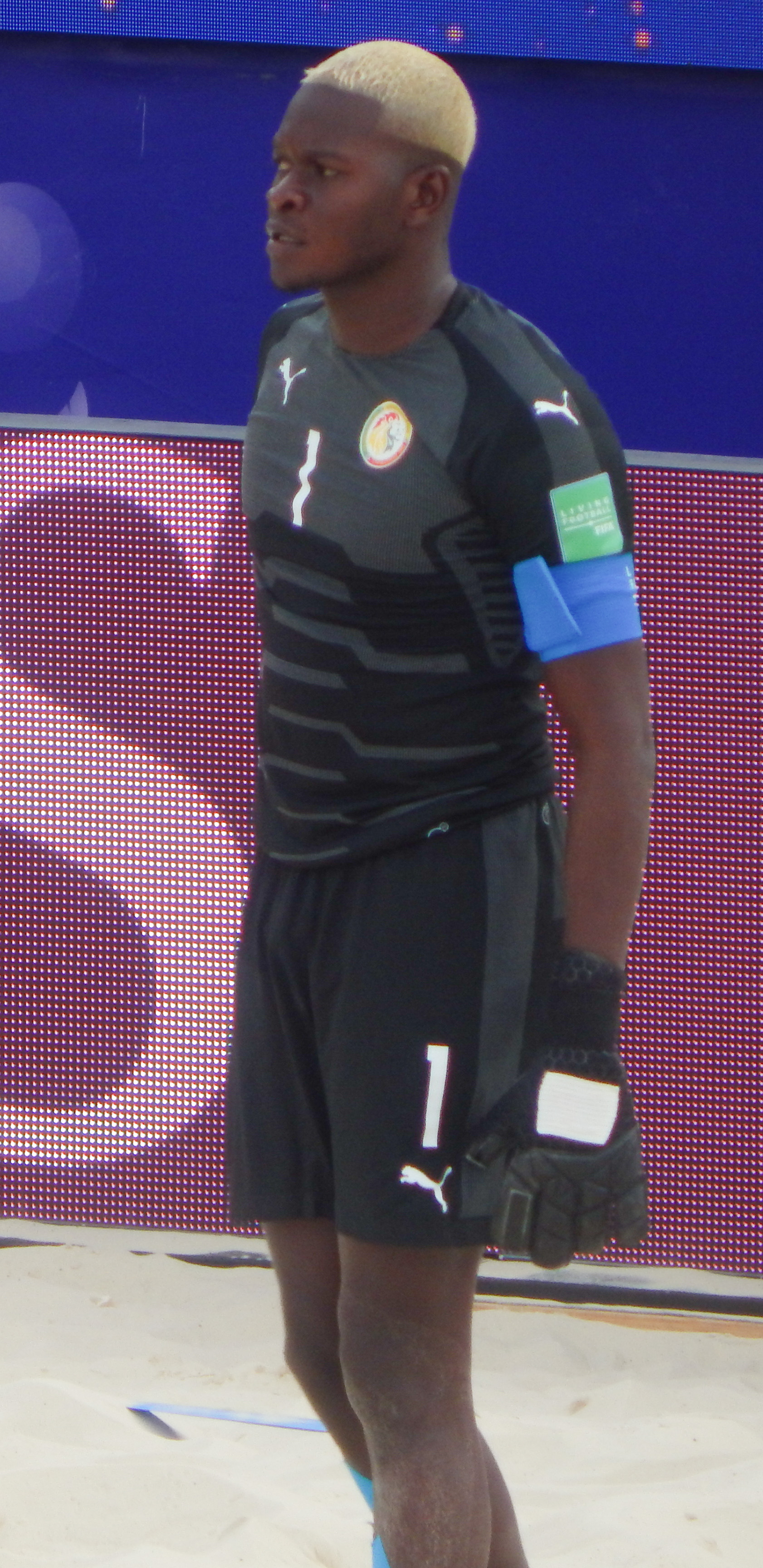
Al Seyni Ndiaye is a seven-time winner of the best goalkeeper award.

| Year | Top goalscorer(s) | Gls | Best player | Best goalkeeper |
|---|---|---|---|---|
| (South Africa) 2006 | (Nigeria) Gabriel Agu; (South Africa) Mark Williams | 9 | (Ivory Coast) Frédéric Aka | (Cameroon) Pascal Mbeyo |
| (South Africa) 2007 | (Nigeria) Isiaka Olawale; (Nigeria) Gabriel Agu | 14 | (Ivory Coast) Frédéric Aka | (Senegal) Al Seyni Ndiaye |
| (South Africa) 2008 | (Ivory Coast) Stephane Bobou | 12 | (Senegal) Pape Koukpaki | (Ivory Coast) Kevin Enam |
| (South Africa) 2009 | (Nigeria) Isiaka Olawale | 14 | (Nigeria) Isiaka Olawale | (Ivory Coast) Kevin Enam |
| (Morocco) 2011 | (Senegal) Babacar Fall (Senegal) Pape Koukpaki | 8 | (Nigeria) Isiaka Olawale | (Senegal) Al Seyni Ndiaye |
| (Morocco) 2013 | (Nigeria) Abu Azeez | 12 | (Morocco) Nassim El Hadaoui | (Senegal) Al Seyni Ndiaye |
| (Seychelles) 2015 | (Ghana) Alexander Adjei | 15 | (Madagascar) Toky Randriamampandry | (Madagascar) Jhorialy Rafalimanana |
| (Nigeria) 2016 | (Senegal) Babacar Fall | 11 | (Nigeria) Emeka Ogbonna | (Senegal) Al Seyni Ndiaye |
| (Egypt) 2018 | (Ivory Coast) Assouan Kablan | 10 | (Nigeria) Abu Azeez | (Senegal) Al Seyni Ndiaye |
| (Senegal) 2021 | (Mozambique) Nelson Manuel | 10 | (Mozambique) Nelson Manuel | (Senegal) Al Seyni Ndiaye |
| (Mozambique) 2022 | (Senegal) Mandione Diagne | 10 | (Senegal) Mandione Diagne | (Senegal) Al Seyni Ndiaye |

=== By nationality ===
| Rank | Team | Awards |
|---|---|---|
| 1 | Senegal | 13 |
| 2 | Nigeria | 9 |
| 3 | Ivory Coast | 6 |
| 4 | Madagascar | 2 |
| 5 | Mozambique | 2 |
| 6 | Morocco | 1 |
| 7 | Ghana | 1 |
| 8 | Cameroon | 1 |
| 9 | South Africa | 1 |

== Summary (2006-2022) ==
| Rank | Team | Part | M | W | WE | WP | L | GF | GA | GD | Points |
|---|---|---|---|---|---|---|---|---|---|---|---|
| 1 | Senegal | 10 | 47 | 36 | 1 | 3 | 7 | 275 | 148 | +127 | 113 |
| 2 | Nigeria | 9 | 40 | 24 | 2 | 1 | 13 | 237 | 169 | +68 | 77 |
| 3 | Egypt | 11 | 48 | 22 | 1 | 3 | 22 | 226 | 183 | +41 | 71 |
| 4 | Morocco | 9 | 38 | 20 | 0 | 0 | 18 | 163 | 143 | +20 | 60 |
| 5 | Ivory Coast | 9 | 40 | 16 | 1 | 4 | 19 | 180 | 185 | –5 | 54 |
| 6 | Madagascar | 6 | 25 | 9 | 2 | 2 | 12 | 120 | 111 | +9 | 33 |
| 7 | Cameroon | 3 | 12 | 6 | 0 | 1 | 5 | 55 | 55 | 0 | 19 |
| 8 | Mozambique | 5 | 18 | 6 | 0 | 1 | 11 | 59 | 89 | –30 | 19 |
| 9 | South Africa | 5 | 15 | 4 | 0 | 0 | 11 | 60 | 65 | –5 | 12 |
| 10 | Uganda | 2 | 8 | 2 | 0 | 1 | 5 | 26 | 44 | –18 | 7 |
| 11 | Ghana | 3 | 12 | 2 | 0 | 0 | 10 | 48 | 76 | –28 | 6 |
| 12 | Cape Verde | 2 | 7 | 1 | 0 | 1 | 5 | 22 | 46 | –24 | 4 |
| 13 | Algeria | 1 | 3 | 1 | 0 | 0 | 2 | 14 | 19 | –5 | 3 |
| 14 | Libya | 5 | 16 | 1 | 0 | 0 | 15 | 63 | 109 | –46 | 3 |
| 15 | Tanzania | 2 | 8 | 0 | 1 | 0 | 7 | 20 | 42 | –22 | 2 |
| 16 | Malawi | 1 | 3 | 0 | 0 | 0 | 3 | 11 | 17 | –6 | 0 |
| 17 | Mauritius | 1 | 2 | 0 | 0 | 0 | 2 | 3 | 23 | –20 | 0 |
| 18 | Seychelles | 2 | 8 | 0 | 0 | 0 | 8 | 12 | 58 | –46 | 0 |

Points: W = 3 points / WE = 2 points / WP = 1 points / L = 0 points

== Appearances & performance timeline ==
The following is a performance timeline of the teams who have appeared in this tournament and how many appearances they each have made.

Additionally, eight teams have entered the qualification round at least once since its introduction in 2015 without having yet qualified for the finals, nor having participated in the tournament before 2015 when entry was automatic which are: Burundi, Comoros, Djibouti, Kenya, Liberia, Mali, Sudan and Tunisia. A further team, DR Congo, qualified for the 2021 tournament but withdrew before the finals began.

Legend

- 1st – Champions
- 2nd – Runners-up
- 3rd – Third place
- 4th – Fourth place
- 5th–9th – Fifth to ninth place^{[a]}
- R1 – Round 1 (group stage)
- × – Did not enter
- ×× – Entered qualifying but withdrew
- • – Did not qualify
- •• – Qualified but withdrew
- q – Qualified for upcoming tournament
- – Hosts (qualify automatically)
- Apps – No. of appearances

a. In some years, teams knocked-out at round 1 played no further matches (these results are marked as R1).
In other years, classification matches were then played to determine all final placements.

Timeline

Entry requirements:

- 2006–2013: Automatic entry for all teams.
- Since 2015: Eight teams qualify through the qualification round.

| Year Team | 2006 (South Africa) (6) | 2007 (South Africa) (8) | 2008 (South Africa) (8) | 2009 (South Africa) (9) | 2011 (Morocco) (9) | 2013 (Morocco) (8) | 2015 (Seychelles) (8) | 2016 (Nigeria) (8) | 2018 (Egypt) (8) | 2021 (Senegal) (7) | 2022 (Mozambique) (8) | 2024 (Egypt) (8) | Apps /11 |
|---|---|---|---|---|---|---|---|---|---|---|---|---|---|
| Algeria | × | × | × | × | 6th | × | × | × | × | × | × | • | 1 |
| Cameroon | 1st | R1 | 2nd | × | × | × | ×× | × | × | × | • | • | 3 |
| Cape Verde | × | 6th | R1 | × | × | × | × | • | × | × | × | • | 2 |
| Egypt | 3rd | 5th | 4th | 4th | 3rd | R1 | 6th | 3rd | 3rd | 5th | 2nd | 4th | 12 |
| Ghana | × | × | × | × | × | R1 | 7th | 7th | × | ×× | • | 5th | 4 |
| Ivory Coast | 4th | 3rd | 3rd | 2nd | 7th | 2nd | 4th | 6th | 6th | ×× | • | • | 9 |
| Libya | × | × | × | R1 | 8th | R1 | ×× | 8th | 8th | ×× | ×× | • | 5 |
| Madagascar | × | × | × | × | 4th | R1 | 1st | 5th | 5th | ×× | R1 | • | 6 |
| Malawi | × | × | × | × | × | × | × | × | × | × | 6th | 7th | 2 |
| Mauritania | • | • | • | • | • | • | • | • | • | • | • | 2nd | 1 |
| Mauritius | × | × | × | R1 | × | × | • | × | × | × | × | • | 1 |
| Morocco | 6th | × | × | 5th | 5th | 3rd | 5th | 4th | 4th | 3rd | 3rd | 3rd | 10 |
| Mozambique | × | R1 | R1 | 6th | × | × | • | • | • | 2nd | 4th | 6th | 6 |
| Nigeria | 2nd | 1st | R1 | 1st | 2nd | 4th | 3rd | 2nd | 2nd | × | ×× | • | 10 |
| Senegal | × | 2nd | 1st | 3rd | 1st | 1st | 2nd | 1st | 1st | 1st | 1st | 1st | 11 |
| Seychelles | × | × | × | × | × | × | 8th | × | × | 7th | • | • | 2 |
| South Africa | 5th | 4th | R1 | R1 | 9th | × | • | × | ×× | × | × | • | 5 |
| Tanzania | × | × | × | × | × | × | • | • | 7th | 6th | • | 8th | 3 |
| Uganda | × | × | × | × | × | × | • | ×× | • | 4th | 5th | • | 2 |

== Performance of qualifiers at the World Cup ==
The following is a performance timeline of the CAF teams who appeared in the Beach Soccer World Cup since being sanctioned by FIFA in 2005.

Legend

- 1st – Champions
- 2nd – Runners-up
- 3rd – Third place
- 4th – Fourth place
- – Hosts
- QF – Quarter-finals
- R1 – Round 1 (group stage)
- q – Qualified for upcoming tournament
- Total – Total times qualified for World Cup

| Team \ Years | (Brazil) 2005 | (Brazil) 2006 | (Brazil) 2007 | (France) 2008 | (United Arab Emirates) 2009 | (Italy) 2011 | (French Polynesia) 2013 | (Portugal) 2015 | (The Bahamas) 2017 | (Paraguay) 2019 | (Russia) 2021 | (United Arab Emirates) 2023 | (Seychelles) 2025 | Total |
|---|---|---|---|---|---|---|---|---|---|---|---|---|---|---|
| Cameroon | | R1 | | R1 | | | | | | | | | | 2 |
| Côte d'Ivoire | | | | | R1 | | R1 | | | | | | | 2 |
| Egypt | | | | | | | | | | | | R1 | | 1 |
| Madagascar | | | | | | | | R1 | | | | | | 1 |
| Mauritania | | | | | | | | | | | | | Q | 1 |
| Mozambique | | | | | | | | | | | R1 | | | 1 |
| Nigeria | | R1 | QF | | R1 | QF | | | R1 | R1 | | | | 6 |
| Senegal | | | QF | R1 | | QF | R1 | R1 | QF | QF | 4th | R1 | Q | 10 |
| Seychelles | | | | | | | | | | | | | Q | 1 |
| South Africa | R1 | | | | | | | | | | | | | 1 |
| Total number of unique qualifiers | | | | | | | | | | | | | | 10 |

Notes

1. In 2005, no qualification was held and South Africa were selected to represent CAF at the FIFA Beach Soccer World Cup.
