= Al Seyni Ndiaye =

Senegalese beach soccer player

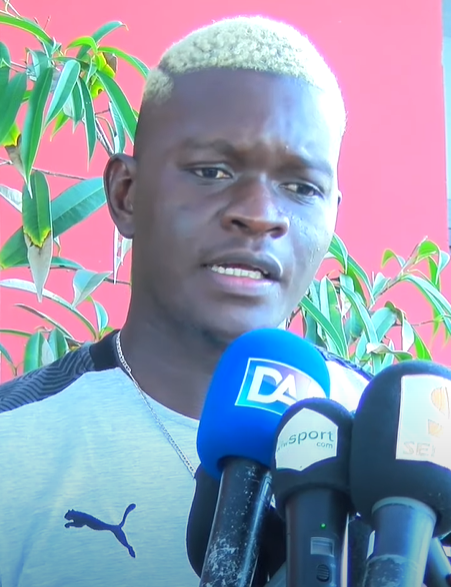
- Ndiaye in 2021.

Personal information
- Full name: Al Seyni Ndiaye
- Date of birth: 31 December 1989 (age 36)
- Place of birth: Senegal
- Height: 1.90 m (6 ft 3 in)
- Position: Goalkeeper

International career^{‡}
Years	Team	Apps	(Gls)
2007–	Senegal	150	
- ‡ National team caps and goals as of 28 October 2022

Al Seyni Ndiaye (born 31 December 1989) is a Senegalese beach soccer player who plays as a goalkeeper. He has been part of the Senegal national team since its formation. Ndiaye is currently captain of Senegal.

He has appeared at eight editions of the FIFA Beach Soccer World Cup. Regionally, at the Africa Beach Soccer Cup of Nations, he has been a seven-time champion and has also won the best goalkeeper award on seven occasions. Beach Soccer Worldwide (BSWW) have called him "Africa's best beach soccer goalkeeper", whilst teammate Raoul Mendy has called him the "key player in every match" for Senegal.

== Career ==
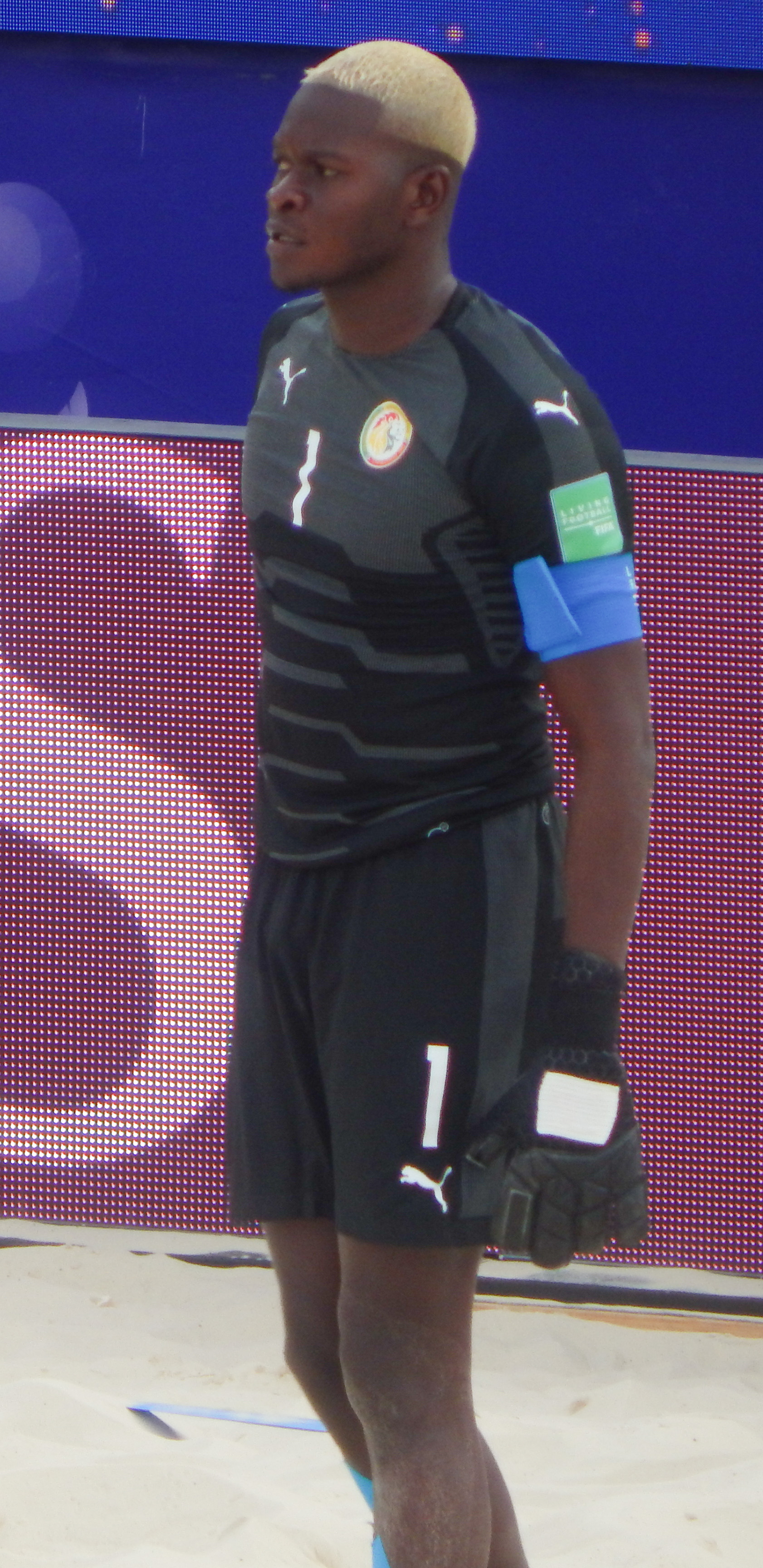
Ndiaye at the 2021 World Cup.

Ndiaye has been part of the Senegal national team since its formation for the 2007 FIFA Beach Soccer World Cup qualifiers when he was 17, but entered beach soccer by chance; the goalkeeper who was originally supposed to go to the tournament was ultimately unable to travel due to issues with his passport. Ndiaye was subsequently contacted and after just one week's of training, competed in the competition. He claims he didn't fully understand the rules at the time of competing, but "immediately fell in love with the sport". By 2011 Ndiaye was already being labelled as a "young veteran".

He was named as one of the top 50 players in the world by BSWW in 2017, and again in 2019; on 11 October of the latter, Ndiaye won his 100th cap for Senegal against Paraguay at the World Beach Games. After Senegal's sixth African title in May 2021, along with the rest of the squad, Ndiaye was received at the Office of the Ministry of Sports and was made a Knight of the National Order of the Lion. That year, he also stated his intention to play for another ten years, despite considering making way for younger players. At the FIFA Beach Soccer World Cup in August in Russia, he was an integral part in Senegal's semi-final run, the best result by an African nation in the tournament's history. His performances earned him a place among the world's top three nominees for best goalkeeper of the year at the Beach Soccer Stars awards in November. Ndiaye won his 150th cap for his country against Egypt in the final of the 2022 Africa Beach Soccer Cup of Nations.

He has played for clubs in Europe, including Real Münster of Germany (winning awards in the German National Championship) and Barcelona of Spain.

Throughout his career, Ndiaye has been noted for his trademark platinum blond hair.

== Statistics ==
Note: Some of the sources of these statistics may have counted an appearance when the player was actually an unused substitute.

Competition	Year	Apps	Goals	Ref.
FIFA Beach Soccer World Cup
FIFA Beach Soccer World Cup	(Brazil) 2007	4	0	
FIFA Beach Soccer World Cup	(France) 2008	3	0	
FIFA Beach Soccer World Cup	(Italy) 2011	4	0	
FIFA Beach Soccer World Cup	(French Polynesia) 2013	3	0	
FIFA Beach Soccer World Cup	(Portugal) 2015	3	0	
FIFA Beach Soccer World Cup	(The Bahamas) 2017	3	0	
FIFA Beach Soccer World Cup	(Paraguay) 2019	4	0	
FIFA Beach Soccer World Cup	(Russia) 2021	5	0	
Total		29	0	—

== Honours ==
Note: This list is not intended to be exhaustive.

- FIFA Beach Soccer World Cup
  - Fourth place (1): 2021
- Africa Beach Soccer Cup of Nations
  - Winner (7): 2008, 2011, 2013, 2016, 2018, 2021, 2022
  - Best goalkeeper (7): 2007, 2011, 2013, 2016, 2018, 2021, 2022
- Beach Soccer Stars
  - World's top 3 best goalkeepers (1): 2021
  - World's top 50 best players (4): 2017, 2019, 2021, 2022
- Orders
  - Knight of the National Order of the Lion (since 2021)
