= Mauritius national beach soccer team =

National sports team

Mauritius
- Nickname(s): Club M, Les Dodos
- Association: Mauritius Football Association
- Confederation: CAF (Africa)
- Head coach: Eddy Rose
- Captain: Kelly Mariva
- FIFA code: MRI
- BSWW ranking: NR (2 September 2026)
First colours
Second colours

First international
- Mauritius 0 – 13 Nigeria (Durban, South Africa; 1 July 2009)

Biggest win
- Mauritius 3 – 2 Réunion (Le Tampon, Réunion; 8 May 2009)

Biggest defeat
- Mauritius 0 – 13 Nigeria (Durban, South Africa; 1 July 2009)

CAF Beach Soccer Championship
- Appearances: 1 (first in 2009)
- Best result: Group Stage (2009)

The Mauritius national beach soccer team represents Mauritius in international beach soccer competitions and is controlled by the MFA, the governing body for football in Mauritius. The Mauritius national beach soccer team played their first game, a FIFA Beach Soccer World Cup qualifier, in July 2009, losing 0–13 to Nigeria. Their first win came in the 2009 Festisable du Tampon, which took place in Réunion, in which Mauritius won against the hosts 3–2.

== Current squad ==
Correct as of 2011

Note: Flags indicate national team as defined under FIFA eligibility rules; some limited exceptions apply. Players may hold more than one non-FIFA nationality.

No.	Pos.	Nation	Player
1	GK		Kevin Jean-Louis
2	DF		Guillano Édouard
3	DF		Christopher L'Enclume
4	DF		Jean-Marie Chavry
5	MF		Jonathan Ernest
6	MF		Ashley Lemince

No.	Pos.	Nation	Player
7	MF		Gravel Azie
8	MF		Kelly Mariva (captain)
9	FW		David Azie
10	FW		Stéphane Arthée
18	FW		Jonathan Moutou
11	GK		Kingsley Mitraille

Coach: Eddy Rose

== Current staff ==
- Head of Delegation: Nanda Kistnen

== Awards and competition records ==
=== Festisable du Tampon record ===
- 2009 — 2nd
- 2011 — 4th

=== CAF Beach Soccer Championship record ===
- 2006–2008 — Did not participate
- 2009 — 9th
- 2011 — Did not participate

=== FIFA Beach Soccer World Cup record ===
- 1995–2008 — Did not participate
- 2009 — Did not qualify
- 2011 — Did not participate

== Schedule ==
Win Tie Loss
