= Abu Azeez =

Nigerian beach soccer player (born 1995)

Personal information
- Full name: Abu Abolaji Azeez
- Date of birth: 31 May 1994 (age 32)
- Place of birth: Lagos, Nigeria
- Height: 1.79 m (5 ft 10 in)
- Position: Forward

Youth career
- 2006–2009: Owibeseb FC
- 2009–2010: Bridge F.C.

Senior career*
Years	Team	Apps	(Gls)
2013–2014	Kwara United F.C.		
2014–2016	Warri Wolves F.C.		
2016–2017	Enyimba F.C.		
2017–2018	Shooting Stars F.C.		
2018–2019	Rangers International F.C.		
2019	Remo Stars F.C.		
2019–2020	Warri Wolves F.C.		
2023–2024	Chittagong Abahani	9	(1)

International career^{‡}
2009–	Nigeria	79	(129)
- * Club domestic league appearances and goals as of 24 February 2024 ‡ National team caps and goals as of 09:58, 8 April 2020 (UTC)

Abu Abolaji Azeez (born 31 May 1994) is a Nigerian soccer player who last played as a forward for Bangladesh Premier League side Chittagong Abahani. He represents the Nigeria national beach soccer team.

== Early life ==
Abu Azeez grew up in Ojo part of Lagos in Nigeria with parents who made education a priority for him. He had a strong love for football but could only watch his friends join and represent school teams as his father didn't approve of him joining them.

Unfortunately, he had to wait till his dad died in 2005 before he could join a team. He got his first pair of boot with his father's gratuity.

== Club career ==
Abu joined amateur football team, Owibeseb FC in 2006 and spent three years with them before joining Bridge F.C. in 2009.

He turned professional in 2013 when he signed for Nigerian Professional Football League side, Kwara United F.C. He spent a year with the Ilorin-based club before he was signed by Warri Wolves F.C.

In 2016, he made the switch to Enyimba FC of Aba but once again he moved to Shooting stars sports club of ibadan the following year after a trial with Turkish club Samsunspor.

After one year back in the western part of Nigeria, Azeez moved back to the east, signing for the Enugu Rangers. He played one season with the Flying Antelopes before he joined Remo Stars F.C.

With Remo Stars dropping to the Nigeria National League in 2019, Azeez returned to Warri Wolves for a second stint and has been an important member of the team this season.

== International career ==
Abu Azeez made his debut for Nigeria at the 2009 FIFA Beach Soccer World Cup in Dubai where he scored twice as Nigeria crashed out in the group stages.

He became a vital member of the team from after that tournament and won his first trophy with the team in 2011 at the Copa Lagos.

In 2016, while he was still with Enyimba, Azeez announced that he was retiring from international beach football so he could focus regular football.

He, however, returned to the team later that year to help the West African to a second-place finish at the 2016 Africa Beach Soccer Cup of Nations which was hosted in Nigeria.

Azeez named Nigeria's captain in 2019, a year after he became the first and only Nigeria Beach soccer player to reach a century of goals.

== Player profile ==
Azeez is a forward who plays as a winger or centre forward. While primarily right-footed, he also plays with his left foot. He competes in the Nigeria Professional Football League.

== Honours and achievements ==
Nigeria

- FIFA Beach Soccer World Cup
  - Quarterfinals: 2011
- BSWW Tour - Copa Lagos
  - Winners: 2011, 2012, 2013
  - Runners-up: 2019
- Africa Beach Soccer Cup of Nations
  - Runners-up: 2011, 2016, 2018
  - Third-place: 2015
  - Fourth-place: 2013

Warri Wolves

- 2015 Nigeria Professional Football League: 2nd Place

Individual

- MTN Lagos Street Soccer
  - MVP: 2010
- Beach Soccer Worldwide
  - Ambassador: Since 2017
  - Top 50 best Beach Soccer Worldwide players 2017
- BSWW Tour - Copa Lagos
  - MVP: 2011, 2012, 2017
- Africa Beach Soccer Cup of Nations
  - Top scorer: 2013
- African Beach Games
  - Top scorer: 2019
