= 2008 CAF Beach Soccer Championship =

2008 FIFA Beach Soccer World Cup qualifiers for (CAF)

Tournament details
- Host country: South Africa
- Dates: 25–30 March
- Teams: 8 (from 1 confederation)
- Venue: 1 (in 1 host city)

Final positions
- Champions: Senegal (1st title)
- Runners-up: Cameroon
- Third place: Ivory Coast
- Fourth place: Egypt

Tournament statistics
- Matches played: 16
- Goals scored: 156 (9.75 per match)

The 2008 CAF Beach Soccer Championship also known as the 2008 FIFA Beach Soccer World Cup qualifiers for (CAF) was the third beach soccer championship for Africa, held in March 2008, in Durban, South Africa. Senegal won the championship, with Cameroon finishing second. The two teams moved on to play in the 2008 FIFA Beach Soccer World Cup in Marseille, France, from 17–28 July.

== Participating nations ==
- Cameroon
- Cape Verde
- Egypt
- Ivory Coast
- Mozambique
- Nigeria
- Senegal
- South Africa

== Group stage ==
=== Group A ===
| Team | Pts | Pld | W | W+ | L | GF | GA | GD |
|---|---|---|---|---|---|---|---|---|
| Senegal | 6 | 3 | 2 | 0 | 1 | 22 | 9 | +13 |
| Egypt | 5 | 3 | 1 | 1 | 1 | 16 | 11 | +5 |
| South Africa | 3 | 3 | 1 | 0 | 2 | 10 | 14 | -4 |
| Mozambique | 3 | 3 | 1 | 0 | 2 | 6 | 20 | -14 |

25 March 2008

| Egypt | 8 – 3 | Mozambique |

Durban

25 March 2008

| Senegal | 8 – 4 | South Africa |

Durban

26 March 2008

| Egypt | 5 – 4 (extra-time) | Senegal |

Durban

26 March 2008

| Mozambique | 3 – 2 | South Africa |

Durban

27 March 2008

| Senegal | 10 – 0 | Mozambique |

Durban

27 March 2008

| South Africa | 4 – 3 | Egypt |

Durban

=== Group B ===
| Team | Pts | Pld | W | W+ | L | GF | GA | GD |
|---|---|---|---|---|---|---|---|---|
| Cameroon | 8 | 3 | 2 | 1 | 0 | 19 | 12 | +7 |
| Ivory Coast | 3 | 3 | 1 | 0 | 2 | 13 | 14 | -1 |
| Nigeria | 3 | 3 | 1 | 0 | 2 | 19 | 10 | +9 |
| Cape Verde | 2 | 3 | 0 | 1 | 2 | 7 | 23 | -16 |

- Côte d'Ivoire progressed due to their head-to-head result against Nigeria
25 March 2008

| Cameroon | 8 – 3 | Cape Verde |

Durban

25 March 2008

| Ivory Coast | 5 – 4 | Nigeria |

Durban

26 March 2008

| Cameroon | 8 – 6 | Ivory Coast |

Durban

26 March 2008

| Nigeria | 12 – 2 | Cape Verde |

Durban

27 March 2008

| Cape Verde | 2 – 2 (1 - 0 pens.) | Ivory Coast |

Durban

27 March 2008

| Cameroon | 3 – 3 (3 - 2 pens.) | Nigeria |

Durban

== Knockout stage ==
Semi-finals
29 March 2008
Cameroon | 4
Egypt | 3
29 March 2008
Senegal (pen.) | 5 (6)
Ivory Coast | 5 (5)

Final
30 March 2008
Senegal | 12
Cameroon | 6
Third place
30 March 2008
Ivory Coast | 6
Egypt | 3

== Winners ==
(2008) FIFA Beach Soccer World Cup
Qualification (CAF) Winners:

Senegal
First title

== Final standings ==
| Rank | Team |
|---|---|
| 1 | Senegal |
| 2 | Cameroon |
| 3 | Ivory Coast |
| 4 | Egypt |
| 5 | Nigeria |
| 6 | South Africa |
| 7 | Mozambique |
| 8 | Cape Verde |
