= 2006 CAF Beach Soccer Championship =

2006 FIFA Beach Soccer World Cup qualification (CAF)

Tournament details
- Host country: South Africa
- Dates: 26–30 September
- Teams: 6 (from 1 confederation)
- Venue: 1 (in 1 host city)

Final positions
- Champions: Cameroon (1st title)
- Runners-up: Nigeria
- Third place: Egypt
- Fourth place: Ivory Coast

Tournament statistics
- Matches played: 11
- Goals scored: 100 (9.09 per match)

The 2006 CAF Beach Soccer championship also known as the 2006 FIFA Beach Soccer World Cup qualifiers for (CAF) was the first beach soccer championship for Africa, held in September 2006, in Durban, South Africa. Cameroon won the championship, with Nigeria finishing second. The two moved on to play in the 2006 FIFA Beach Soccer World Cup in Rio de Janeiro, Brazil from 2 to 12 November.

== Competing nations ==
- Cameroon
- Ivory Coast
- Egypt
- Morocco
- Nigeria
- South Africa (hosts)

== Group stage ==
=== Group A ===
Team	Pts	Pld	W	W+	L	GF	GA	GD
Egypt	5	2	1	1	0	7	6	+1
Nigeria	3	2	1	0	1	10	9	+1
South Africa	0	2	0	0	2	9	11	-2

26 September 2006

Egypt	4 – 3	South Africa

Durban, South Africa

27 September 2006

Egypt	3 – 3 3-2 (pens.)	Nigeria

Durban, South Africa

28 September 2006

Nigeria	7 – 6	South Africa

Durban, South Africa

=== Group B ===
Team	Pts	Pld	W	W+	L	GF	GA	GD
Ivory Coast	4	2	0	2	0	11	10	+1
Cameroon	3	2	1	0	1	8	6	+2
Morocco	0	2	0	0	2	10	13	-3

26 September 2006

Ivory Coast	8 – 7 (extra-time)	Morocco

Durban, South Africa

27 September 2006

Cameroon	5 – 3	Morocco

Durban, South Africa

28 September 2006

Ivory Coast	3 – 3 1-0 (pens.)	Cameroon

Durban, South Africa

== Knockout stage ==
Semi-finals
29 September 2006
Nigeria (pen.)	5 (2)
Ivory Coast	5 (1)
29 September 2006
Cameroon	4
Egypt	3

Final
30 September 2006
Cameroon	5
Nigeria	3
Third place
30 September 2006
Egypt	8
Ivory Coast	3

Fifth place match
South Africa	5
Morocco	4

== Winners ==
(2006) FIFA Beach Soccer World Cup
Qualification (CAF) Winners:

Cameroon
First title

== Final standings ==
Rank	Team
1	Cameroon
2	Nigeria
3	Egypt
4	Ivory Coast
5	South Africa
6	Morocco
