= Nigeria national beach soccer team =

National sports team

Nigeria
- Nickname: Super Sand Eagles
- Association: Nigeria Football Federation
- Confederation: CAF (Africa)
- Sub-confederation: WAFU (West Africa)
- Head coach: Audu Adamu
- Top scorer: Azeez Abu (105)
- FIFA code: NGA
- BSWW ranking: 88 ▼5 (19 January 2026)
First colours
Second colours

First international
- Peru 12–1 Nigeria (Figueira da Foz, Portugal; 3 August 1998)

Biggest defeat
- Brazil 20–1 Nigeria (Figueira da Foz, Portugal; 5 August 1998)

World Cup
- Appearances: 5 (first in 2006)
- Best result: Quarterfinals (2006, 2011)

Africa Beach Soccer Cup of Nations
- Appearances: 8 (first in 2000)
- Best result: Champions (2007, 2009)

The Nigerian national beach soccer team represents Nigeria in international beach soccer competitions and is controlled by the Nigeria Football Federation, the governing body for football in Nigeria.

== Competitive record ==
=== World Cup record ===
FIFA Beach Soccer World Cup
Year	Result	Position	Pld	W	W+	L	GF	GA
(Brazil) 2006	Group stage	9th	3	1	0	2	13	13
(Brazil) 2007	Quarterfinals	6th	4	1	2	1	15	15
(United Arab Emirates) 2009	Group stage	12th	3	1	0	2	16	21
(Italy) 2011	Quarterfinals	6th	4	2	0	2	21	22
(French Polynesia) 2013	did not qualify							
(Portugal) 2015	did not qualify							
(The Bahamas) 2017	Group stage	12th	3	1	0	2	15	20
(Paraguay) 2019	Group stage	16th	3	0	0	3	8	28
(Russia) 2021	did not qualify							
(United Arab Emirates) 2024	did not qualify							
(Seychelles) 2025	did not qualify							
Total	6/21	-	20	6	2	12	92	119

=== Africa Beach Soccer Cup of Nations record ===
Africa Beach Soccer Cup of Nations
Year	Result	Position	Pld	W	D	L	GF	GA
(South Africa) 2006	Runners-up	2nd	4	2	1	1	15	16
(South Africa) 2007	Champions	1st	5	5	0	0	37	24
(South Africa) 2008	Group-stage	6th	3	1	0	2	19	12
(South Africa) 2009	Champions	1st	4	4	0	0	33	15
(Morocco) 2013	Fourth-place	4th	5	2	0	3	30	33
(Seychelles) 2015	Third-place	3rd	4	4	0	1	33	13
(Nigeria) 2016	Runners-up	2nd	5	3	0	2	21	18
(Egypt) 2018	Runners-up	2nd	5	4	0	1	22	21
(Senegal) 2021	Did not qualify							
(Mozambique) 2022	Withdrawn							
(Egypt) 2024	Did not qualify							
Total	2 Titles	8/11	35	25	1	10	210	152

== Team honours and achievements ==
Intercontinental

- FIFA Beach Soccer World Cup
  - Quarterfinals: 2006, 2011
- BSWW Tour - Copa Lagos
  - Winners: 2011, 2012, 2013
  - Runners-up: 2019

Continental

- Africa Beach Soccer Cup of Nations
  - Winners: 2009, 2007
  - Runners-up: 2006, 2011, 2016, 2018
  - Third-place: 2015
  - Fourth-place: 2013

== Current squad ==
For BSWW Tour - Copa Lagos 2019

Head coach: (Nigeria) Audu Adamu

No.	Pos.	Player	Date of birth (age)	Caps	Club
1	GK	Godwin Ayalogu	11 December 1985 (aged 31)		(Nigeria) Kwara United FC
2	DF	Emmanuel Ohwoferia	10 December 1992 (aged 24)		(Nigeria) Owibeseb FC
3	DF	Ogbonnaya Okemmiri	13 June 1986 (aged 30)		(Nigeria) Abia Warriors FC
4	DF	Adams Taiwo	22 October 1992 (aged 24)		(Nigeria) Owibeseb FC
5	DF	Godspower Igudia	13 August 1993 (aged 23)		(Nigeria) Akwa United FC
6	DF	Victor Tale	9 September 1989 (aged 27)		(Nigeria) Kogi United FC
7	FW	Isiaka Olawale	11 November 1983 (aged 33)		(Nigeria) Kwara United FC
8	FW	Azeez Abu	31 May 1994 (aged 22)		(Bangladesh) Chittagong Abahani
9	FW	Emeka Ogbonna	11 January 1992 (aged 25)		(Nigeria) Leeds FC
10	FW	Bartholomew Ibenegbu	22 February 1986 (aged 31)		(Nigeria) Enyimba FC
11	FW	Suleiman Mohammed	20 September 1996 (aged 20)		(Nigeria) Ifeanyi Ubah FC
12	GK	Danjuma Paul	18 December 1992 (aged 24)		(Nigeria) Katsina United FC
