= South Africa national beach soccer team =

National sports team

South Africa
- Nickname: Beach Bafana
- Association: South African Football Association
- Confederation: CAF (Africa)
- Sub-confederation: COSAFA (Southern Africa)
- Head coach: (South Africa) Fani Shange
- Captain: Lowell Kinsey
- FIFA code: RSA
- BSWW ranking: NR (2 September 2026)
First colours
Second colours

CAF Beach Soccer Championship
- Appearances: 5 (first in 2006)
- Best result: Fourth Place (2007)

The South Africa national beach soccer team represents South Africa in international beach soccer competitions and is controlled by the South African Football Association, the governing body for soccer in South Africa. The team's nickname is Beach Bafana.

== Current squad ==
Correct as of March 2024

- The following players were named for the 2023 COSAFA Beach Soccer Championship

Note: Flags indicate national team as defined under FIFA eligibility rules; some limited exceptions apply. Players may hold more than one non-FIFA nationality.

No.	Pos.	Nation	Player
1	GK	RSA	Nduduzo Msane
2		RSA	Lamulani Gift Shange
4		RSA	Lowell Kinsey, (captain)
6		RSA	Siyabonga Mkhize
2		RSA	Xolani Hlela
11		RSA	Abongile Gcuda

No.	Pos.	Nation	Player
8		RSA	Prince Gumede
8		RSA	Khethukuthula Sizwe Mkhize
3		RSA	Sphephelo Cele
12		RSA	Kwazi Bhengu
11		RSA	Sfundo Mdladla
5		RSA	Ntuthuko Mbutho
14		RSA	Darron Ja Fish
20		RSA	Ernest Skhalo Mahlaba

Coach: Fani Nsuku Shange

== Current staff ==
Fani Nsuku Shange was appointed head coach for the 2023 COSAFA Beach Soccer Championship.

== Results and fixtures ==
The following is a list of match results in the last 12 months, as well as any future matches that have been scheduled.

Legend

Win Draw Loss Fixture

== Achievements ==
- FIFA Beach Soccer World Cup Best: Twelfth place
  - 1999, 2005
- CAF Beach Soccer Championship Best: Fourth place
  - 2007

== Competitive record ==
=== CAF Beach Soccer Championship ===
CAF Beach Soccer Championship record
Year	Round	Pld	W	D*	L	GS	GA	GD
(South Africa) 2007	Fourth place	5	4	0	1	24	24	0
(South Africa) 2008	Group Stage	3	1	0	2	10	14	-4
(South Africa) 2009	Group Stage	2	0	0	2	8	11	-3
(Morocco) 2011	Group Stage	2	0	0	2	4	11	-7
(Morocco) 2013	Did not qualify							
(Seychelles) 2015	Did not qualify							
(Nigeria) 2016	Did not qualify							
(Egypt) 2018	Did not qualify							
(Senegal) 2021	Did not qualify							
(Mozambique) 2022	Did not qualify							
(Egypt) 2024	Did not enter							

=== COSAFA Beach Soccer Championship ===
COSAFA Beach Soccer Championship record
Year	Round	Pld	W	D*	L	GS	GA	GD
(South Africa) 2023	Group Stage	3	1	0	2	3	6	-3
