= Algeria national beach soccer team =

Algeria
- Association: Algerian Football Federation
- Confederation: CAF (Africa)
- Head coach: Lakhdar Belloumi
- FIFA code: ALG
- BSWW ranking: NR (1 June 2026)
First colours
Second colours

CAF Beach Soccer Championship
- Appearances: 1 (first in 2011)
- Best result: Group Stage (2011)

The Algeria national beach soccer team represents Algeria in international beach soccer competitions and is controlled by the Algerian Football Federation, the governing body for football in Algeria.

== Current squad ==
Correct as of June 2011

Note: Flags indicate national team as defined under FIFA eligibility rules; some limited exceptions apply. Players may hold more than one non-FIFA nationality.

No.	Pos.	Nation	Player
1	GK		M'hamed Haniched
2	DF		Tarek Ghoul
4	DF		Mustapha Maza
5	MF		Brahim Arafat Mezouar
6	DF		Moulay Haddou

No.	Pos.	Nation	Player
8	MF		Fayçal Badji
9	FW		Farid Ghazi
10	MF		Mohamed Reda Abbaci
11	FW		Fawzi Moussouni
22	GK		Farid Belmellat

Coach: Lakhdar Belloumi

== Current staff ==
- Assistant Manager: Mourad Slatni
- Head Delegation: Mustapha Kouici

== Achievements ==
- CAF Beach Soccer Championship Best: sixth place
  - 2011
