= Guillano Édouard =

Mauritian footballer

Personal information
- Full name: Guillano Édouard
- Date of birth: 19 January 1979 (age 47)
- Place of birth: Mauritius
- Position: Defender

Senior career*
Years	Team	Apps	(Gls)
1998–2002	Olympique de Moka	?	(?)
2002–2005	US Beau-Bassin/Rose Hill	?	(?)
2005–2009	AS Port-Louis 2000	?	(?)
2010–	AS de Vacoas-Phoenix	?	(?)

International career
1999–	Mauritius	27	(0)
- * Club domestic league appearances and goals

Guillano Édouard (born 19 January 1979) is a Mauritian international footballer who plays as a defender. As of May 2011, he has won 27 caps for the Mauritius national football team.
