= 2007 CAF Beach Soccer Championship =

2007 FIFA Beach Soccer World Cup qualification (CAF)

Tournament details
- Host country: South Africa
- Dates: 3–8 July
- Teams: 8 (from 1 confederation)
- Venue: 1 (in 1 host city)

Final positions
- Champions: Nigeria (1st title)
- Runners-up: Senegal
- Third place: Ivory Coast
- Fourth place: South Africa

Tournament statistics
- Matches played: 17
- Goals scored: 174 (10.24 per match)

The 2007 CAF Beach Soccer championship also known as the 2007 FIFA Beach Soccer World Cup qualifiers for (CAF) was the second beach soccer championship for Africa, held in July 2007, in Durban, South Africa. Nigeria won the championship, with Senegal finishing second. The two moved on to play in the 2007 FIFA Beach Soccer World Cup in Rio de Janeiro, Brazil from 2 to 11 November.

== Participating nations ==
- Cameroon
- Cape Verde
- Egypt
- Ivory Coast
- Mozambique
- Nigeria
- Senegal
- South Africa

== Group stage ==
=== Group A ===
Team	Pts	Pld	W	L	GF	GA	GD
Ivory Coast	9	3	3	0	21	8	+13
South Africa	6	3	2	1	18	15	+3
Cape Verde	3	3	1	2	13	16	-3
Mozambique	0	3	0	3	8	21	-13

3 July 2007

Cape Verde	6 – 5	Mozambique

Durban

3 July 2007

Ivory Coast	9 – 4	South Africa

Durban

4 July 2007

Ivory Coast	4 – 2	Cape Verde

Durban

4 July 2007

South Africa	7 – 1	Mozambique

Durban

5 July 2007

Ivory Coast	8 – 2	Mozambique

Durban

5 July 2007

South Africa	7 – 5	Cape Verde

Durban

=== Group B ===
Team	Pts	Pld	W	L	GF	GA	GD
Nigeria	9	3	3	0	24	13	+11
Senegal	6	3	2	1	15	17	-2
Egypt	3	3	1	2	18	20	-2
Cameroon	0	3	0	3	9	16	-7

3 July 2007

Nigeria	5 – 0	Cameroon

Durban

3 July 2007

Senegal	5 – 4	Egypt

Durban

4 July 2007

Nigeria	9 – 7	Egypt

Durban

4 July 2007

Senegal	4 – 3	Cameroon

Durban

5 July 2007

Nigeria	10 – 6	Senegal

Durban

5 July 2007

Egypt	7 – 6	Cameroon

Durban

== Knockout stage ==
Semi-finals
7 July 2007
Senegal	9
Ivory Coast	3
7 July 2007
Nigeria	7
South Africa	6 (Extra time)

Final
8 July 2007
Nigeria	6
Senegal	5
Third place
8 July 2007
Ivory Coast	2
South Africa	0

5th/6th Place match
3A	Cape Verde	2
3B	Egypt	8

== Winners ==
(2007) FIFA Beach Soccer World Cup
Qualification (CAF) Winners:

Nigeria
First title

== Final standings ==
Rank	Team
1	Nigeria
2	Senegal
3	Ivory Coast
4	South Africa
5	Egypt
6	Cape Verde
7	Cameroon
8	Mozambique
