= 2006 FIFA Beach Soccer World Cup =

2006 edition of the FIFA Beach Soccer World Cup

Copa do Mundo de Futebol de Areia da FIFA Rio de Janeiro 2006

Tournament details
- Host country: Brazil
- City: Rio de Janeiro
- Dates: 2–12 November
- Teams: 16 (from 6 confederations)
- Venue: 1 (in 1 host city)

Final positions
- Champions: Brazil (1st title)
- Runners-up: Uruguay
- Third place: France
- Fourth place: Portugal

Tournament statistics
- Matches played: 32
- Goals scored: 286 (8.94 per match)
- Attendance: 179,800 (5,619 per match)
- Top scorer: (Portugal) Madjer (21 goals)
- Best player: (Portugal) Madjer
- Fair play award: France

The 2006 FIFA Beach Soccer World Cup was the second edition of the FIFA Beach Soccer World Cup, governed by FIFA. Overall, this was the 12th edition of a world cup in beach soccer since the establishment of the Beach Soccer World Championships which ran from 1995–2004 but was not governed by FIFA. It took place in Rio de Janeiro, Brazil, from 2–12 November 2006.

The winners of the tournament were hosts Brazil, who won their first FIFA Beach Soccer World Cup title and their tenth world title overall.

== Major changes to format ==
After the 2005 World Cup, beach soccer continued to grow and spread worldwide at a fast rate. Therefore, FIFA established the FIFA Beach Soccer World Cup qualifiers, to try to allow more nations to play in the World Cup, as well as getting more national teams involved in the sport. FIFA also increased the number of participating teams in the World Cup from 12 to a record-high 16 teams. This also meant that nations would no longer be invited to play in the World Cup but would have to qualify.

With the establishment of the qualifying rounds, FIFA decided to standardise each World Cup, meaning that from this World Cup onwards, each confederation would have the same number of teams participating in each World Cup and that the 16 teams would be split up into four groups of four teams, with the top two teams moving on to the quarter-finals.

== Qualifying rounds ==
=== African zone ===
African nations were allocated 2 berths at the World Cup. The championship took place between September 28 and September 30, 2006. Cameroon and Nigeria were the two finalists, meaning they both qualified for the World Cup. Cameroon defeated Nigeria in the final to win the title.

=== Asian zone ===
Asian nations were allocated 3 berths at the World Cup. The championship took place between May 22 and May 26, 2006. Bahrain and Japan were the two finalists, meaning they both qualified for the World Cup. Bahrain defeated Japan in the final to win the title. Iran and China were knocked out in the semi-finals and played each other in the third place play off. Iran beat China to claim the third berth at the World Cup.

=== European zone ===
European nations were allocated 5 berths at the World Cup. Instead of having a specific tournament for World Cup qualification, qualification was achieved through the 2006 Euro Beach Soccer League which took place earlier in the year. The nations who made it to the second stage of the Superfinal qualified to the World Cup being Spain, Portugal, Poland and Italy. To decide who would claim the fifth berth, the defeated nations in the competition came back to play in a straight knockout tournament, with the winner progressing to the World Cup. The nation which won the tournament was France who beat Switzerland in the final.

=== North, Central American and Caribbean zone ===
North, Central American and Caribbean nations were allocated 2 berths at the World Cup. The championship took place between September 13 and September 17, 2006. The United States and Canada were the two finalists, meaning they both qualified for the World Cup. The United States defeated Canada in the final to win the title.

=== Oceanian zone ===
Oceanian nations were allocated 1 berth at the World Cup. The championship took place between August 31 and September 3, 2006. The Solomon Islands and Vanuatu were the two finalists. The Solomon Islands defeated Vanuatu in the final to win the title and qualify for the World Cup.

=== South American zone ===
South American nations were allocated 3 berths at the World Cup. The championship took place between March 5 and March 12, 2006. Brazil and Uruguay were the two finalists, meaning they both qualified for the World Cup. Brazil defeated Uruguay in the final to win the title. Argentina and Venezuela were knocked out in the semi-finals and played each other in the third place play off. Argentina beat Venezuela to claim the third berth at the World Cup.

== Teams ==
These are the teams that qualified for the World Cup:

Asian zone:

- Bahrain (first appearance)
- Iran (first appearance)
- Japan

African zone:

- Cameroon (first appearance)
- Nigeria (first appearance)

European zone:

- France
- Italy
- Poland (first appearance)
- Portugal
- Spain

North, Central American and Caribbean zone:

- Canada
- United States

Oceanian zone:

- Solomon Islands (first appearance)

South American zone:

- Argentina
- Brazil
- Uruguay

== Venue ==
As with the previous FIFA editions of the World Cup held in Rio, the tournament once again took place at the Copacabana Beach Soccer Arena.

Rio de Janeiro	2006 FIFA Beach Soccer World Cup (Brazil)
Copacabana Beach Soccer Arena	2006 FIFA Beach Soccer World Cup (Brazil)
22°58′S 43°10′W	2006 FIFA Beach Soccer World Cup (Brazil)
Capacity: 10,000	2006 FIFA Beach Soccer World Cup (Brazil)

== Group stage ==
The 16 teams present at the finals in Brazil were split into 4 groups of 4 teams. Each team played the other 3 teams in its group in a round-robin format, with the top two teams advancing to the quarter finals. The quarter finals, semi finals and the final itself was played in the form of a knockout tournament.

All matches are listed as local time in Rio de Janeiro, (UTC-3)

=== Group A ===
Team	Pld	W	W+	L	GF	GA	GD	Pts
Brazil	3	3	0	0	29	10	19	9
Japan	3	1	0	2	15	22	–7	3
Poland	3	1	0	2	12	18	–6	3
United States	3	1	0	2	14	20	–6	3

Note:
- Japan, Poland and the USA were tied on 3 points each, and one win against each other in their head-to-head records;
- The nations were then ranked based on Goal Difference in the matches between the three (Japan +1, Poland +1, USA -2);
- Finally, the next criterion was Goals For between Japan and Poland, in the matches between the three (Japan +13, and Poland +10), in which resulted on Japan taking the group's runner-up position.
2 November 2006
12:40

United States	4–8	Japan
Xexeo 10'; Farberoff 17'; Morales 30'; Chimienti 35'	Report	2', 16', 25' Yoshii; 10' Kuroki; 19', 35' Kawaharazuka; 27' Maruo

Copacabana Beach
Attendance: 6,000
Referee: Vincenzo Cascone (Italy)

2 November 2006
11:00

Brazil	9–2	Poland
Benjamin 2'; Betinho 10', 14'; Buru 12', 31'; Junior Negão 12', 35'; André 16', 34'	Report	19' Żuk; 36' Saganowski

Copacabana Beach
Attendance: 10,000
Referee: Christian Hauben (Belgium)

5 November 2006
11:00

Brazil	10–2	Japan
Buru 2', 16', 18', 27'; Junior Negão 9', 20'; Bruno 9', 11', 12'; Bueno 26'	Report	5' Shiokawa; 32' Uehara

Copacabana Beach
Attendance: 10,000
Referee: José Luis Da Rosa (Uruguay)

5 November 2006
12:20

Poland	2–4	United States
Saganowski 5'; Żuk 27'	Report	4' Chimienti; 17' Tanguinod; 19' Astorga; 29' Chimienti

Copacabana Beach
Attendance: 6,000
Referee: Carlos Ferreira (Portugal)

7 November 2006
11:00

Brazil	10–6	United States
Junior Negão 2', 21'; Benjamin 4', 5', 6'; Bruno 10', 12', 15'; Buru 24'; Betinho 25'	Report	10', 12', 24' Xexeo; 11', 23' Astorga; 25' Taguinod

Copacabana Beach
Attendance: 10,000
Referee: Joao Almeida (Portugal)

7 November 2006
13:40

Poland	8–5	Japan
Saganowski 1', 15', 22', 23', 26'; Ziober 15'; Bartczak 24'; Polakowski 32'	Report	2', 29', 36' Kawaharazuka; 15' Kuroki; 19' Toma

Copacabana Beach
Attendance: 2,000
Referee: José Luis Da Rosa (Uruguay)

=== Group B ===
Team	Pld	W	W+	L	GF	GA	GD	Pts
France	3	3	0	0	21	8	13	9
Canada	3	1	1	1	11	14	–3	5
Spain	3	1	0	2	10	12	–2	3
Iran	3	0	0	3	10	18	–8	0

3 November 2006
12:20

Canada	6–6 (a.e.t.)	Iran
Diaz 4'; Sibiya 8', 15', 27', 33'; Yamada 36'	Report	1', 16', 35' Ahmadzadeh; 14' Oostovari; 16' Dara; 23' Abdollahi
Penalties
Sibiya (penalty scored)	1–0	(penalty missed) Ahmadzadeh

Copacabana Beach
Attendance: 5,000
Referee: Joao Almeida (Portugal)

3 November 2006
13:40

Spain	4–7	France
Amarelle 6', 8', 34'; Alfonso 34'	Report	17' François; 20' Libbra; 23', 27', 27' Samoun; 25' Edouard; 29' Basquaise

Copacabana Beach
Attendance: 5,000
Referee: José Luis Da Rosa (Uruguay)

5 November 2006
22:40

France	8–1	Canada
Castro 6'; Basquaise 19', 20', 29'; Perez 21', 31'; François 33'; Sciortino 35'	Report	26' Lemire

Copacabana Beach
Attendance: 5,000
Referee: Renato De Carlos (Brazil)

5 November 2006
13:40

Iran	1–6	Spain
Razaeipoor 8'	Report	5' Alfonso; 14' Johnny; 18', 36' Nico; 27', 29' Amarelle

Copacabana Beach
Attendance: 5,000
Referee: Alberto Moreira (Brazil)

7 November 2006
18:40

France	6–3	Iran
Castro 2'; Sciortino 10'; Samoun 12'; Libbra 23'; Basquaise 31', 31'	Report	18' Hashempour; 28' Ahmadzadeh; 20' Dara

Copacabana Beach
Attendance: 4,000
Referee: Joao Alberto Duarte (Brazil)

7 November 2006
17:20

Spain	0–4	Canada
	Report	12', 34' Selaidopoulos; 16' Sibiya; 36' Yamada

Copacabana Beach
Attendance: 5,000
Referee: Ivo De Moraes (Brazil)

=== Group C ===
Team	Pld	W	W+	L	GF	GA	GD	Pts
Portugal	3	3	0	0	29	9	20	9
Uruguay	3	1	0	2	17	13	4	3
Solomon Islands	3	1	0	2	12	26	–14	3
Cameroon	3	0	1	2	8	18	–10	2

2 November 2006
17:00

Portugal	5–4	Uruguay
Alan 2', 7'; Madjer 11', 34'; Hernâni 34'	Report	5' Coco; 9' Cabrera; 10' Olivera; 18' Pampero

Copacabana Beach
Attendance: 3,000
Referee: Joao Alberto Duarte (Brazil)

2 November 2006
13:40

Solomon Islands	5–2	Cameroon
Naka 5', 18', 31', 35'; Omokirio 8'	Report	32' Ngiladjoe; 33' Eyoum

Copacabana Beach
Attendance: 5,000
Referee: Joao Almeida (Portugal)

4 November 2006
22:40

Uruguay	10–5	Solomon Islands
Coco 4'; Aguirre 12', 22'; Fabian 13'; Pampero 14', 25'; Damian 21'; Matias 28'; Parrillo 30'; Seba 32'	Report	16', 31' Koto; 20' Rogy; 29' Naka; 36' Omokirio

Copacabana Beach
Attendance: 4,000
Referee: Antonio Buaiz (Brazil)

4 November 2006
12:20

Cameroon	3–10	Portugal
Tamen 9', 26', 28'	Report	2', 3', 3', 13', 18', 29' Madjer; 17' Alan; 19', 35' Marinho; 34' Gustavo

Copacabana Beach
Attendance: 5,000
Referee: Juan Rodríguez (Argentina)

6 November 2006
11:00

Cameroon	3–3 (a.e.t.)	Uruguay
Ngiladjoe 9'; Bithe 18', 32'	Report	15', 30' Pampero; 27' Miguel
Penalties
Eyoum (penalty missed); Nyamsi (penalty scored)	1–0	(penalty missed) Pampero; (penalty missed) Fabian

Copacabana Beach
Attendance: 1,300
Referee: Vincenzo Cascone (Italy)

6 November 2006
13:40

Solomon Islands	2–14	Portugal
Anisua 20'; Luwi 23'	Report	2', 8', 13', 14' Madjer; 4' Marinho; 9', 18' Alan; 17' Jorge; 23', 35' Gustavo; 25' Hernâni; 27', 31' Belchior; 36' Loja

Copacabana Beach
Attendance: 800
Referee: Alberto Moreira (Brazil)

=== Group D ===
Team	Pld	W	W+	L	GF	GA	GD	Pts
Argentina	3	3	0	0	10	6	4	9
Bahrain	3	1	1	1	10	9	1	5
Nigeria	3	1	0	2	13	13	0	3
Italy	3	0	0	3	6	11	–5	0

2 November 2006
22:40

Argentina	5–4	Nigeria
S. Hilaire 6', 27'; F. Hilaire 9'; Minici 15', 34'	Report	3' Agu; 10', 19' Onigbo; 18' Usman

Copacabana Beach
Attendance: 3,000
Referee: Antonio Buaiz (Brazil)

2 November 2006
22:40

Italy	2–4	Bahrain
Pasquali 23', 35'	Report	5', 32' Salem; 5' Hassan; 28' Alnisuf

Copacabana Beach
Attendance: 5,000
Referee: Renato De Carlos (Brazil)

4 November 2006
11:40

Nigeria	4–3	Italy
Ibenegbu 14'; Olawale 29', 35'; Onigbo 36'	Report	11' El Hafez; 16', 17' Pasquali

Copacabana Beach
Attendance: 5,000
Referee: Joao Alberto Duarte (Brazil)

4 November 2006
13:40

Bahrain	1–2	Argentina
Ebrahim 7'	Report	12' E. Hilaire; 26' F. Hilaire

Copacabana Beach
Attendance: 6,000
Referee: Christian Hauben (Belgium)

6 November 2006
22:40

Bahrain	5–5 (a.e.t.)	Nigeria
Salem 16', 33'; Ebrahim 22'; Omar 30', 3'	Report	2' Olawale; 14' Ibenegbu; 28' Okemmiri; 36' Agu; 36' Okpara
Penalties
Salem (penalty scored); Hassan (penalty scored); Ebrahim (penalty scored); Almughawi (penalty scored)	4–3	(penalty scored) Agu; (penalty scored) Olawale; (penalty scored) Onigbo; (penalty missed) Usman

Copacabana Beach
Attendance: 800
Referee: Michele Conti (Italy)

6 November 2006
12:20

Italy	1–3	Argentina
Palmacci 28'	Report	1', 24' Andrade; 26' S. Hilaire

Copacabana Beach
Attendance: 1,400
Referee: Antonio Buaiz (Brazil)

== Knockout stage ==
Quarter-finals
9 November 2006
France	3
Japan	2
9 November 2006
Argentina	1
Uruguay	2
9 November 2006
Brazil	12
Canada	1
9 November 2006
Portugal	6
Bahrain	2

Semi-finals
11 November 2006
France	2 (0)
Uruguay (pen.)	2 (1)
11 November 2006
Brazil	7
Portugal	4

Final
12 November 2006
Uruguay	1
Brazil	4
Third place
12 November 2006
France	6
Portugal	4

=== Quarter-finals ===
9 November 2006
11:00

Brazil	12–1	Canada
Júnior Negrão 4', 21', 36'; Benjamin 14', 25', 34'; Bueno 22', 23'; Bruno 24', 24'; Betinho 25', 28'	Report	34' Sibiya

Copacabana Beach
Attendance: 10,000
Referee: Pedro Infantes (Venezuela)

9 November 2006
12:20

Portugal	6 – 2	Bahrain
Alan 6'; Madjer 13', 27', 28'; Gustavo 22'; Belchior 31'	Report	18' Omar; 29' Salem

Copacabana Beach
Attendance: 6,000
Referee: Ivo De Moraes (Brazil)

9 November 2006
13:40

Uruguay	2–1	Argentina
Ricar 36'; Miguel 36'	Report	28' S. Hilaire

Copacabana Beach
Attendance: 4,500
Referee: Joao Alberto Duarte (Brazil)

9 November 2006
22:40

France	3–2	Japan
Samoun 14'; Basquaise 16'; Edouard 31'	Report	36' Toma; 36' Kuroki

Copacabana Beach
Attendance: 6,000
Referee: Carlos Ferreira (Portugal)

=== Semi-finals ===
11 November 2006
11:00

Brazil	7–4	Portugal
Sidney 6', 19', 29'; Bueno 9'; Bruno 13', 27'; Betinho 18'	Report	1', 6', 10' Madjer; 7' Alan

Copacabana Beach
Attendance: 10,000
Referee: Christian Hauben (Belgium)

11 November 2006
21:30

Uruguay	2–2 (a.e.t.)	France
Fabian 3', 34'	Report	20' Pérez; 35' Samoun
Penalties
Ricar (penalty scored)	1–0	(penalty missed) Edouard

Copacabana Beach
Attendance: 10,000
Referee: Pendro Infantes (Venezuela)

=== Third place play off ===
12 November 2006
11:00

Portugal	4–6	France
Alan 1'; Madjer 11', 14', 30'	Report	1', 19' Cardoso; 7' Ottavy; 25' Samoun; 28' Castro; 30' François

Copacabana Beach
Attendance: 10,000
Referee: Antonio Buaiz (Brazil)

=== Final ===
12 November 2006
21:30

Brazil	4–1	Uruguay
Buru 11'; Benjamin 17'; Duda 26'; Sidney 34'	Report	14' Ricar

Copacabana Beach
Attendance: 10,000
Referee: Christian Hauben (Belgium)

== Winners ==
2006 FIFA Beach Soccer World Cup
Champions

Brazil
First title
10th world title

== Awards ==
Golden Ball	Silver Ball	Bronze Ball
(Portugal) Madjer	(Brazil) Benjamin	(Brazil) Bruno
Golden Shoe	Silver Shoe	Bronze Shoe
(Portugal) Madjer	(Brazil) Benjamin	(Brazil) Bruno
21 goals	12 goals	10 goals
FIFA Fair Play Award
France

== Top scorers ==
21 goals

- (Portugal) Madjer

12 goals

- (Brazil) Benjamin

10 goals

- (Brazil) Bruno

9 goals

- (Brazil) Júnior Negão

8 goals

- (Portugal) Alan

7 goals

- (Poland) Boguslaw Saganowski
- (France) Didier Samoun
- (France) Jeremy Basquaise

6 goals

- (Canada) Sipho Sibiya
- (Brazil) Betinho

5 goals

- (Spain) Amarelle
- (Solomon Islands) James Naka
- (Bahrain) Rashed Salem
- (Japan) Takeshi Kawaharazuka
- (Uruguay) Pampero

4 goals

- (United States) Raphael Xexeo
- (Iran) Mohammad Ahmadzadeh
- (Italy) Roberto Pasquali

4 goals (cont.)

- (Argentina) Santiago Hilaire
- (Brazil) Bueno
- (Uruguay) Miguel
- (Brazil) Sidney
- (Brazil) Buru
- (Portugal) Gustavo

3 goals

- (Bahrain) Abdulla Omar
- (United States) Benyam Astorga
- (Nigeria) Ifeanyi Onigbo
- (Nigeria) Isiaka Olawale
- (Cameroon) Medrano Tamen
- (United States) Mario Chimienti
- (Japan) Katsuhiro Yoshii
- (Japan) Masahito Toma
- (Japan) Naoyuki Kuroki
- (Portugal) Belchior
- (Uruguay) Fabian
- (France) Laurent Castro
- (Portugal) Marinho
- (France) Sebastien Perez
- (France) Stéphane François

2 goals

- (Poland) Marek Zuk
- (Spain) Alfonso
- (Nigeria) Bartholomew Ibenegbu
- (United States) Brendon Taguinod
- (Cameroon) Etienne Ngiladjoe

2 goals (cont.)

- (Iran) Faroogh Dara
- (Nigeria) Gabriel Agu
- (Solomon Islands) Henry Koto
- (Solomon Islands) Omo
- (Cameroon) Valery Bithe
- (Spain) Nico
- (Argentina) Facundo Minici
- (Argentina) Federico Andrade
- (Argentina) Federico Hilaire
- (Canada) Kyle Yamada
- (Canada) Kyriakos Selaidopoulos
- (Bahrain) Adnan Ebrahim
- (Brazil) Andre
- (Uruguay) Coco
- (Portugal) Hernani
- (France) Jairzinho Cardoso
- (France) Jean-Marc Edouard
- (France) Marc Libbra
- (Uruguay) Matias
- (France) Noel Sciortino
- (Uruguay) Ricar

35 others scored 1 goal each

== Final standings ==
Position	Team
1	Brazil
2	Uruguay
3	France
4	Portugal
5	Argentina
6	Bahrain
7	Canada
8	Japan
9	Nigeria
10	Spain
11	Poland
12	United States
13	Solomon Islands
14	Cameroon
15	Italy
16	Iran
