= 2011 CAF Beach Soccer Championship =

Beach soccer competition

2011 FIFA Beach Soccer World Cup Qualification (CAF)

Tournament details
- Host country: Morocco
- Dates: 15–19 June
- Teams: 9 (from 1 confederation)
- Venue(s): 1 (in 1 host city)

Final positions
- Champions: Senegal (2nd title)
- Runners-up: Nigeria
- Third place: Egypt
- Fourth place: Madagascar

Tournament statistics
- Matches played: 15
- Goals scored: 131 (8.73 per match)
- Top scorer(s): (Senegal) Pape Jean Koukpaki, (Senegal) Babacar Fall, and (Nigeria) Isiaka Olawale (8 goals)
- Best player(s): (Nigeria) Isiaka Olawale

The 2011 CAF Beach Soccer Championship were the qualifiers for African national beach soccer teams to determine the two teams that qualify for the 2011 FIFA Beach Soccer World Cup. They took place from 15–19 June 2011 at a temporary stadium at the Ain Diab beach in Casablanca, Morocco for the first time. All previous CAF qualifiers were held in Durban, South Africa.

== Participating teams ==
Nine teams, the same number of teams that participated in the 2009 qualifiers, confirmed their participation in the competition:

- Algeria
- Ivory Coast
- Egypt
- Libya
- Madagascar
- Morocco
- Nigeria
- South Africa
- Senegal

It was originally announced that Congo DR would field a team for this tournament, but were forced to withdraw due to what is termed as 'serious administrative problems.'

== Group stage ==
Due to Congo DR's withdrawal, it was determined that the nine teams will be divided into three groups of three, with the teams in each group participating in a round-robin format. The winners of each group, along with the best second-place finisher, will advance to the knockout round.

The draw to determine the groupings and schedule for the nine teams was held in Casablanca on 13 June 2011.

All match times are correct to that of local time in Casablanca, being Western European Summer Time, (UTC +1).

=== Group A ===
Team	Pld	W	W+	L	GF	GA	GD	Pts
Egypt	2	2	0	0	7	3	+4	6
Morocco	2	1	0	1	7	8	−1	3
Libya	2	0	0	2	8	11	−3	0

15 June 2011
18:15

Morocco	7 – 5	Libya
M. Mokhtari 3', 31'; El Boudi (o.g.) 5'; N. El Hadaoui 25', 26'; A. Atlassi 26', 34'	Report	Al-Edressi 22', 36'; Mansur 30'; Eisa 35'; Sertawi 36'

Ain Diab, Casablanca

16 June 2011
18:15

Egypt	4 – 3	Libya
Youssef 1'; Moustafa 18'; Aly 22'; Osman 28'	Report	Shaebi 15'; Al-Edressi 25'; Errwimed 35'

Ain Diab, Casablanca

17 June 2011
18:15

Morocco	0 – 3	Egypt
	Report	Aly 6', 10'; Moustafa 23'

Ain Diab, Casablanca

=== Group B ===
Team	Pld	W	W+	L	GF	GA	GD	Pts
Nigeria	2	2	0	0	13	7	+6	6
Madagascar	2	1	0	1	6	5	+1	3
South Africa	2	0	0	2	4	11	−7	0

15 June 2011
17:00

Nigeria	5 – 3	Madagascar
V. Tale 16', 25'; M. Najere 19'; M. Shehu 34'; O. Okemmiri 36'	Report	T. Tsiliva 5'; A. Rakotoson 8', 10'

Ain Diab, Casablanca

16 June 2011
17:00

South Africa	0 – 3	Madagascar
	Report	Flavien 5'; A. Rakotoson 31'; Bernardin 35'

Ain Diab, Casablanca

17 June 2011
17:00

Nigeria	8 – 4	South Africa
M. Shehu 1'; I. Olawale 5', 18', 20', 31'; M. Najere 18'; I. Ibenegbu 20'; A. Abu 28'	Report	Mbhele 6'; Coles 21', 34'; Penn 27'

Ain Diab, Casablanca

=== Group C ===
Team	Pld	W	W+	L	GF	GA	GD	Pts
Senegal	2	2	0	0	12	6	+6	6
Algeria	2	1	0	1	9	12	−3	3
Ivory Coast	2	0	0	2	5	8	−3	0

15 June 2011
15:45

Senegal	9 – 4	Algeria
P. Koukpaki 4', 5', 6', 19'; V. Diagne 9'; B. Fall 29', 31', 31'; A. Diakhate 33'	Report	S. Zerrouki 17'; M. Haddou 19'; M. Haniched 33'; A. Mezouar 35'

Ain Diab, Casablanca

16 June 2011
15:45

Ivory Coast	3 – 5	Algeria
D. Kabletchi 3'; F. Aka 19'; L. Djimi 36'	Report	M. Haddou 5', 19'; F. Moussouni 18', 25'; F. Ghazi 20'

Ain Diab, Casablanca

17 June 2011
15:45

Senegal	3 – 2	Ivory Coast
P. Koukpaki 9'; S. Ndour 27'; B. Fall 35'	Report	Daouda 6'; L. Ehounou 9'

Ain Diab, Casablanca

== Knockout stage ==
Semi-finals
A1	Nigeria	7
W2	Madagascar	6
B1	Senegal	4
C1	Egypt	2

Final
SF1	Nigeria	4
SF2	Senegal	7
3rd/4th Place match
SF1	Madagascar	4(0)
SF2	Egypt	4(1)

=== Seventh Place ===
18 June 2011
15:45

Libya	4 – 6	Ivory Coast
Al-Edressi 14', 26'; Attia 21'; Mansur 27'	Report	Koutouan 8'; Daouda 20', 23', 30'; B. Enam 27'; L. Djimi 34'

Ain Diab, Casablanca

=== Semifinals ===
18 June 2011
17:00

Nigeria	7 – 6	Madagascar
I. Ibenegbu 4', 14', 26', 29'; O. Okemmiri 20'; M. Najere 26'; I. Olawale 32'	Report	Flavien 2'; Bernardin 17'; F. Domoina 20'; T. Tsiliva 23', 25', 26'

Ain Diab, Casablanca
18 June 2011
18:15

Senegal	4 – 2	Egypt
S. Ndour 21', 22'; B. Fall 28', 31'	Report	A. Serie 23'; Aly 31'

Ain Diab, Casablanca

=== Fifth Place ===
19 June 2011
17:00

Morocco	7 – 5	Algeria
S. Yassine 9', 20', 35'; Talal 9', 18'; N. El Hadaoui 14', 25'	Report	F. Moussouni 8', 30'; A. Mezouar 9'; M. Maza 21'; M. Hadou 33'

Ain Diab, Casablanca

=== Third Place ===
19 June 2011
15:45

Madagascar	4 – 4 (a.e.t.)	Egypt
T. Tsiliva 21', 32'; Bernardin 35'; Rasta 39'	Report	Youssef 11', 29'; Osman 24'; A. Serie 37'
Penalties
T. Tsiliva (penalty missed); Bernardin (penalty missed)	0 – 1	(penalty missed) A. Serie; (penalty scored) Moustafa

Ain Diab, Casablanca

=== Final ===
19 June 2011
18:15

Nigeria	4 – 7	Senegal
I. Olawale 12', 27', 32'; A. Abu 33'	Report	P. Koukpaki 2', 16', 27'; N. Sylla 24'; B. Fall 24', 24'; S. Ndour 27'

Ain Diab, Casablanca

== Winners ==
(2011) FIFA Beach Soccer World Cup
Qualification (CAF) Winners:

Senegal
second title

== Awards ==
Best Player (MVP)
(Nigeria) Isiaka Olawale
Top Scorer
(Senegal) Pape Jean Koukpaki, (Senegal) Babacar Fall, and (Nigeria) Isiaka Olawale
8 goals
Best Goalkeeper
(Senegal) Al Seyni Ndiaye
FIFA Fair Play Award
(Morocco) Mustapha El Hadaoui

== Teams Qualifying ==
	Team
1st Place	Senegal
2nd Place	Nigeria

== Final Placement ==
Rank	Team
1	Senegal
2	Nigeria
3	Egypt
4	Madagascar
5	Morocco
6	Algeria
7	Ivory Coast
8	Libya
9	South Africa
