= 2009 CAF Beach Soccer Championship =

Tournament details
- Host country: South Africa
- Dates: 1–5 July
- Teams: 9
- Venue: (in 1 host city)

Final positions
- Champions: Nigeria
- Runners-up: Ivory Coast
- Third place: Senegal
- Fourth place: Egypt

Tournament statistics
- Matches played: 14
- Goals scored: 215 (15.36 per match)

The 2009 CAF Beach Soccer Championship was a qualifying tournament held during 1–5 July 2009 in Durban, South Africa that determined which two participants will represent the CAF region at the 2009 FIFA Beach Soccer World Cup.

== Participating teams ==
- Ivory Coast
- Egypt
- Libya
- Mauritius
- Morocco
- Mozambique
- Nigeria
- Senegal
- South Africa

== Format ==
The nine nation tournament consisted of three groups. The teams played each other once in their group during the group stage. The top teams in each group advanced to the semifinals, the fourth team would be selected according to the best of the second top team of the three groups. The semifinal winners qualified for the 2009 FIFA Beach Soccer World Cup.

== Group stage ==
=== Group A ===
Team	Pld	W	D	L	GF	GA	GD	Pts
Ivory Coast	2	2	0	0	14	12	+2	6
Morocco	2	1	0	1	10	9	+1	3
South Africa	2	0	0	2	8	11	−3	0

1 July 2009

South Africa	2 – 4	Morocco

Durban

2 July 2009

Ivory Coast	7 – 6	Morocco

Durban

3 July 2009

South Africa	6 – 7	Ivory Coast

Durban

=== Group B ===
Team	Pld	W	D	L	GF	GA	GD	Pts
Senegal	2	2	0	0	10	9	+1	5
Mozambique	2	1	0	1	8	9	-1	2
Libya	2	0	0	2	13	13	0	0

1 July 2009

Libya	7 – 7	Senegal
Penalties
	3 – 4

Durban

2 July 2009

Mozambique	6 – 6	Libya
Penalties
	1 – 0

Durban

3 July 2009

Senegal	3 – 2	Mozambique

Durban

=== Group C ===
Team	Pld	W	D	L	GF	GA	GD	Pts
Nigeria	2	2	0	0	19	5	+14	6
Egypt	2	1	0	1	15	9	+6	3
Mauritius	2	0	0	2	3	23	−20	0

1 July 2009

Mauritius	0 – 13	Nigeria

Durban

2 July 2009

Egypt	10 – 3	Mauritius

Durban

3 July 2009

Nigeria	6 – 5	Egypt

Durban

== Knockout stage ==
Semi-finals
A1	Ivory Coast	8(4)
C2	Egypt	8(3)
B1	Senegal	6
C1	Nigeria	7

Final
SF1	Ivory Coast	4
SF2	Nigeria	7
3rd/4th Place match
SF1	Senegal	6
SF2	Egypt	4

Fifth place match
Morocco	9
Mozambique	3

== Winners ==
2009 CAF Beach Soccer winners

Nigeria
Second title

== Qualified Teams ==
- Ivory Coast
- Nigeria

== Final standing ==
Rank	Team
1	Nigeria
2	Ivory Coast
3	Senegal
4	Egypt
5	Morocco
6	Mozambique
7	Libya
8	South Africa
9	Mauritius
