= 2021 FIFA Beach Soccer World Cup =

Чемпионат мира по пляжному футболу 2021 года (Chempionat mira po plyazhnomu futbolu 2021 goda)

Tournament details
- Host country: Russia
- City: Moscow
- Dates: 19–29 August
- Teams: 16 (from 6 confederations)
- Venue: 1 (in 1 host city)

Final positions
- Champions: RFU (3rd title)
- Runners-up: Japan
- Third place: Switzerland
- Fourth place: Senegal

Tournament statistics
- Matches played: 32
- Goals scored: 302 (9.44 per match)
- Attendance: 53,149 (1,661 per match)
- Top scorer(s): (Switzerland) Glenn Hodel (12 goals)
- Best player: (Switzerland) Noël Ott
- Best goalkeeper: (Switzerland) Eliott Mounoud
- Fair play award: Brazil

The 2021 FIFA Beach Soccer World Cup was the 11th edition of the FIFA Beach Soccer World Cup. Overall, this was the 21st edition of a world cup in beach soccer since the establishment of the Beach Soccer World Championships which ran from 1995 to 2004 but was not governed by FIFA. This was the sixth tournament to take place biennially; the World Cup took place annually until 2009. The tournament took place in Moscow, capital of Russia, between 19 and 29 August 2021.

The tournament was first intimated in November 2017 at the FIFA Beach Soccer Workshop when it was announced that the World Cup would continue to be held every two years between 2018 and 2024. The bidding process was opened by FIFA in May 2019 and concluded with the selection of Russia as the hosts in October 2019.

Portugal were the defending champions, but they were eliminated in the group stage. They became the first time defending champions in the tournament's history to be eliminated in the group stage.

The hosts Russia, played as the RFU, won their third World Cup, beating Japan in the final.

== Host selection ==
The bidding schedule to determine the hosts was as follows:

- 9 May 2019 – FIFA opens the bidding process.
- 5 June 2019 – Deadline for national associations to declare interest of hosting to FIFA.
- 7 June 2019 – FIFA circulates documents detailing the application campaign and conditions of participation to the bidding associations to analyse.
- 1 July 2019 – Deadline for associations to reaffirm their bidding intentions by agreeing to the terms of the documents.
- 30 August 2019 – Deadline for nations to prepare and submit their complete bidding packages to be evaluated by FIFA.
- 24 October 2019 – Hosts announced by FIFA.

On 11 September 2019, FIFA revealed that three associations had submitted bids through to the final stage of the process:

- Chile (Easter Island; Football Federation of Chile)
- El Salvador (Salvadoran Football Federation)
- Russia (Russian Football Union)

Confirmation of the awarding of hosting rights to Russia was announced at the FIFA Council meeting in Shanghai, China on 24 October 2019.

== Qualification ==
A total of 16 teams qualified for the final tournament. In addition to Russia who qualified automatically as hosts, 15 other teams qualified from six separate continental competitions. The slot allocation was approved by the FIFA Council on 25 June 2020.

The process of qualification to the World Cup finals began and ended in 2021.

=== Qualifying rounds ===
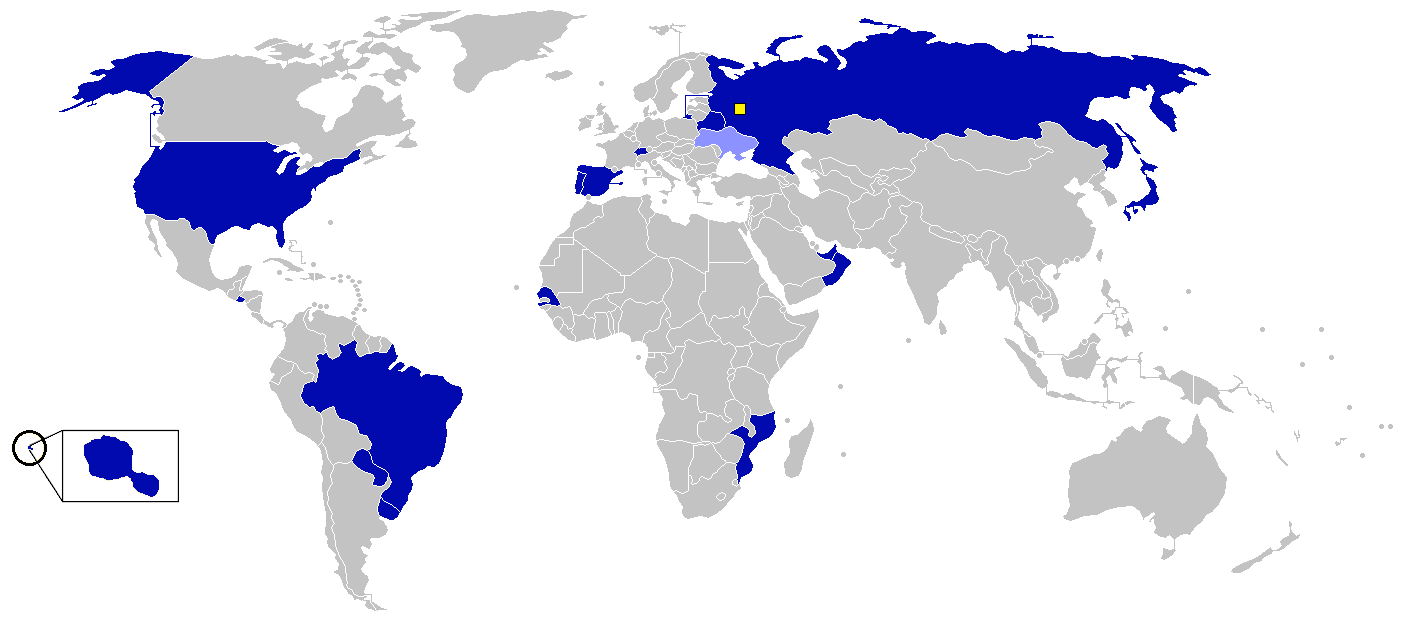
Qualified for the World Cup finals Qualified but withdrew Host location

- AFC: The Asian qualifiers were originally due to take place in Thailand from 18 to 28 March 2021. Due to the COVID-19 pandemic, they were initially postponed to between 28 April and 8 May and were subsequently cancelled entirely in January 2021. In place of the qualifiers, AFC handpicked their three representatives to go to the World Cup on 21 April, choosing the best performing nations over the course of the previous three editions of the AFC Beach Soccer Championship. The Iranian Football Federation officially contested the decision which saw their national team not chosen but their efforts were announced as unsuccessful on 28 April.
- CAF: The African qualifiers were due to take place in Jinja, Uganda from 23 to 29 November 2020. Due to the COVID-19 pandemic and rising water levels on the shores of Lake Victoria affecting the host beach, Uganda withdrew from hosting. Senegal were subsequently chosen as the new hosts, with the tournament rescheduled, taking place from 23 to 29 May 2021.
- CONCACAF: The North American qualifiers took place in Alajuela, Costa Rica from 17 to 23 May 2021.
- CONMEBOL: The South American qualifiers took place in Rio de Janeiro, Brazil from 26 June to 4 July 2021.
- OFC: The Oceanian qualifiers were due to take place in Tahiti in January 2021. Due to the COVID-19 pandemic, they were initially postponed to take place no later than 6 June 2021 and were subsequently cancelled entirely in May 2021. In place of the qualifiers, OFC handpicked their representative to go to the World Cup, choosing the highest ranked Oceanian nation in the current release of the BSWW World Rankings and considering "recent regional performance".
- UEFA: The European qualifiers were due to take place in Jesolo, Italy from 11 to 20 September 2020 but due to the COVID-19 pandemic were postponed and subsequently rescheduled, taking place from 17 to 27 June 2021 in Nazaré, Portugal. Ukraine originally qualified but on 6 July, it was announced that the Ukrainian Association of Football had refused to sanction the participation of the team at the World Cup. It was reported that the decision was made as part of a wider sporting boycott of Russia by Ukrainian authorities due to ongoing tensions between the two states. As the next best-placed team in the qualifiers, Switzerland were chosen to replace Ukraine at the World Cup as lucky losers.

=== Qualified teams ===
The following teams qualified to the finals.

Note: The appearance statistics below refer only to the FIFA era of world cups in beach soccer (since 2005); see this article for the inclusion of World Championships era stats (1995–2004).

Confederation	Qualifying tournament	Team	App	Last	Best performance
AFC (Asia; 3 teams)	~~2021 AFC Beach Soccer Asian Cup~~ (cancelled; teams appointed by AFC)	Japan	11th	2019	Fourth place (2005, 2019)
AFC (Asia; 3 teams)	~~2021 AFC Beach Soccer Asian Cup~~ (cancelled; teams appointed by AFC)	Oman	4th	2019	Group stage (2011, 2015, 2019)
AFC (Asia; 3 teams)	~~2021 AFC Beach Soccer Asian Cup~~ (cancelled; teams appointed by AFC)	United Arab Emirates	7th	2019	Group stage (2007, 2008, 2009, 2013, 2017, 2019)
CAF (Africa; 2 teams)	2021 Africa Beach Soccer Cup of Nations	Mozambique	1st	N/A	Debut
CAF (Africa; 2 teams)	2021 Africa Beach Soccer Cup of Nations	Senegal	8th	2019	Quarter-finals (2007, 2011, 2017, 2019)
CONCACAF (Central, North America and Caribbean; 2 teams)	2021 CONCACAF Beach Soccer Championship	El Salvador	5th	2013	Fourth place (2011)
CONCACAF (Central, North America and Caribbean; 2 teams)	2021 CONCACAF Beach Soccer Championship	United States	6th	2019	Group stage (2005, 2006, 2007, 2013, 2019)
CONMEBOL (South America; 3 teams)	2021 FIFA Beach Soccer World Cup qualification (CONMEBOL)	Brazil	11th	2019	Champions (2006, 2007, 2008, 2009, 2017)
CONMEBOL (South America; 3 teams)	2021 FIFA Beach Soccer World Cup qualification (CONMEBOL)	Paraguay	5th	2019	Quarter-finals (2017)
CONMEBOL (South America; 3 teams)	2021 FIFA Beach Soccer World Cup qualification (CONMEBOL)	Uruguay	7th	2019	Runners-up (2006)
OFC (Oceania; 1 team)	~~2021 OFC Beach Soccer Nations Cup~~ (cancelled; team appointed by OFC)	Tahiti	6th	2019	Runners-up (2015, 2017)
UEFA (Europe; 4 teams + hosts)	Host nation	RFU	8th	2019	Champions (2011, 2013)
UEFA (Europe; 4 teams + hosts)	2021 FIFA Beach Soccer World Cup qualification (UEFA)	Belarus	2nd	2019	Group stage (2019)
UEFA (Europe; 4 teams + hosts)	2021 FIFA Beach Soccer World Cup qualification (UEFA)	Portugal	10th	2019	Champions (2015, 2019)
UEFA (Europe; 4 teams + hosts)	2021 FIFA Beach Soccer World Cup qualification (UEFA)	Spain	8th	2015	Runners-up (2013)
UEFA (Europe; 4 teams + hosts)	2021 FIFA Beach Soccer World Cup qualification (UEFA)	Switzerland	6th	2019	Runners-up (2009)

1. Note RUS: In accordance with the ban by the World Anti-Doping Agency (WADA) and a December 2020 decision by the Court of Arbitration for Sport (CAS), the team from Russia was not permitted to use the Russian name, flag, or anthem; it participated in the 2021 FIFA Beach Soccer World Cup as the team of the Russian Football Union (RFU), and used the flag of the Russian Olympic Committee.
2. Note SUI: Ukraine withdrew. Switzerland replaced the spot.

== Venue ==
One purpose-built venue is being used in the city of Moscow; it is located on the grounds of the Luzhniki Olympic Complex in Khamovniki District.

The arena has a capacity for approximately 4,500 spectators. However, on 4 August 2021 it was announced on that the maximum attendance would be limited to 50% in order to accommodate social distancing measures due to the continuing effects of the COVID-19 pandemic in Russia. Attendees of the arena are expected to wear face coverings at all times, however neither a negative COVID-19 test nor confirmation of vaccine status is required to enter the stadium.

The original bidding documents submitted by the Russian Football Union (RFU) listed the Luzhniki Olympic Complex as the proposed venue, following the success of the location as the setting for the 2019 World Cup qualifiers for UEFA; after the Russian bid was successful, it was decided other locations would be considered. From November 2019 until January 2020, through Moscow's "Active Citizen" online platform for voting on local issues, Muscovites were invited to vote for where in the city they thought the World Cup stadium should be built. Options included the Luzhniki, Sparrow Hills, VDNKh, Victory Park and Red Square. From ~200,000 votes cast, the majority chose the Luzhniki, with 43% of the share of votes. The Luzhniki was subsequently confirmed as the venue in July 2020.

Construction of the temporary structure began on 5 July 2021, at the "Festival Square" area of the complex, outside the front of the Luzhniki Stadium; it was reported as complete on 12 August. 2,000 tons of artificial quartz sand was imported to create the playing surface. It was tested by a specialist laboratory in Canada which compared it favourably to the consistency of natural sand found on Copacabana beach in Rio de Janeiro, Brazil. The sand features a special coating to ensure it maintains its usual viscosity in the event of rain.

Moscow	Location of Moscow in European Russia.
Luzhniki Beach Soccer Arena; Luzhniki Olympic Complex	Location of Moscow in European Russia.
55°42′51″N 37°33′02″E	Location of Moscow in European Russia.
Capacity: 4,500	Location of Moscow in European Russia.

== Organisation ==
The following were some of the milestones in the organisation of the tournament (not belonging of other subsections):

General

- The Russian Football Union (RFU) delegated the organising of the tournament to its "Directorate of Football Events and Projects" on 15 November 2019.
- FIFA delegates met with RFU representatives in Moscow to discuss possible venues, dates and an outline plan leading to the finals, on 17 February 2020.
- A budget of US$7 million for the tournament was approved by the FIFA Council, as part of a revised budget for 2019–22, on 25 June 2020.
- The dates of the tournament were confirmed publicly on 8 July 2020. Originally slated for the beginning of July 2021, it was moved to August due to the effects of the COVID-19 pandemic.
- FIFA and the Local Organising Committee (LOC) held a Zoom meeting together, primarily to assess training facilities that will be in place during the event, on 11 March 2021.
- A working meeting was held at the Luzhniki Stadium in Moscow, between members of FIFA and the LOC, on 20 May 2021. At the meeting, it was confirmed that the World Anti-Doping Agency (WADA) had given consent for the tournament to take place as planned in spite of its December 2020 ban on Russia hosting world championships for two years.
- Applications for the volunteer program opened on 11 June 2021. Final interviews took place by 9 July. 163 volunteers were picked from 1,200 applicants; training took place from 8–15 August.
- FIFA President Gianni Infantino visited the site of the tournament at the Luzhniki to discuss the progress of preparations with the LOC and other authorities on 21 June 2021; he also met with Russian President Vladimir Putin to discuss the tournament.
- Media accreditation was opened on 22 June 2021 and ended on 30 July.
- Kassir.ru was announced as National Supporter and Official Ticketing Operator of the tournament on 20 August 2021.

Marketing

The official poster of the World Cup

- The official emblem of the tournament, featuring a Firebird, a figure in classic Russian fairy tales, was revealed one year to go until the final, on 29 August 2020.
- FIFA and adidas revealed the official match ball, the bright orange "Conext 21 ProBeach", marking three months to the start of the tournament, on 19 May 2021.
- The official promotional poster, inspired by Russian culture and Muscovite landmarks, was revealed on 3 June 2021. It portrays a player jumping to compete for an aerial ball with a Firebird; the latter symbolises "the pursuit of glory and embodies fire, light and sun". The ball is depicted as a golden apple, which symbolises both strength and youth, according to Russian folklore. The domes of St. Basil's Cathedral, the Moscow skyline and Luzhniki Stadium also feature. Its colours were chosen based on "Russian motives and architecture". The poster was painted onto a 24x33 metre temporary canvas at the site of the future stadium of the World Cup which took five days to complete by 10 artists.
- Tickets went on pre-sale on 9 August 2021 and on general sale from the 12 August, ranging from 400 to 700 rubles in price.
- In accordance with the ban by the WADA, RFU announced on 10 August 2021 that the phrase "Our Boys" would replace the Russian emblem on the shirts of its team's players, a two-year old brand of RFU created as part of a campaign to promote unity across all levels of football in Russia.
- The official mascot called "Zharishka", an anthropomorphisation of a Firebird, was revealed on 11 August 2021. This marks the first edition of the World Cup to feature an official mascot.

== Draw ==
The draw to split the 16 teams into four groups of four took place on at 14:00 CEST on 8 July 2021 at FIFA headquarters in Zürich, Switzerland. It was conducted by former Portugal captain, Madjer and former captain of the Russia national football team, Alexey Smertin. Its procedure was as follows:

The teams were first divided into four pots of four based upon a ranking created by considering each team's performances at the World Cup over the past five editions (since 2011); the more recent the tournament, the more weight was given to those results. Bonus points were also awarded to the teams which won their confederation's championship during qualifying. Using this ranking, the best performing teams were placed in Pot 1 (plus the hosts), the next best performers were placed in Pot 2 and so on. What was the composition of the pots is shown below:

Pot 1	Pot 2	Pot 3	Pot 4
RFU (Hosts; assigned to A1) (4); Portugal (Title holders; assigned to D1) (1); Brazil (2); Tahiti (13)	Japan (6); Senegal (10); Switzerland (8); Spain (5)	Paraguay (9); El Salvador (20); United Arab Emirates (14); Uruguay (11)	Oman (21); Belarus (15); United States (16); Mozambique (93)

The numbers in parentheses show the BSWW World Ranking of the teams at the time of the draw, out of 120 nations (The RFU's ranking refers to the Russian national team). This is for context only; it had no influence on the draw.

The draw started with Pot 1. As the hosts, RFU were automatically assigned to position A1. As the title holders, Portugal were automatically assigned to position D1. The other teams were then drawn – the first out was placed into Group C and the second, D. The teams from Pot 2 were then drawn – the first out was placed into Group A, second into B and so on. The same was repeated for Pots 3 and 4. The exact positions in the groups the teams were allocated to was determined by the drawing of a lot from an auxiliary pot.

Teams from the same confederation could not be drawn into the same group, save for UEFA, for which one group was allowed to contain two members.

== Match officials ==
FIFA has chosen 24 officials from 24 different countries to referee matches at the World Cup, who were revealed on 19 July 2021. At least one referee will represent each of the six confederations: four from the AFC, three from CAF, five from CONMEBOL, three from CONCACAF, one from the OFC and eight from UEFA.

Unlike previous World Cups, a "structured preparation programme" was used to develop an open list of candidates over two years from which the final 24 were then selected.

Confederation	Referee	Age	Qualified
AFC	(Iran) Ebrahim Akbarpour	38	2012
AFC	(Oman) Turki Al Salehi	44	2009
AFC	(Japan) Yuichi Hatano	40	2015
AFC	(Malaysia) Suhaimi Mat Hassan	45	2010
CAF	(Tunisia) Hamdi Bchir	35	2016
CAF	(Egypt) Hany Farouk	34	2015
CAF	(Madagascar) Said Hachim	42	2010
CONCACAF	(Dominican Republic) Juan Angeles	41	2012
CONCACAF	(Panama) Gumercindo Batista	41	2012
CONCACAF	(El Salvador) Gonzalo Carballo	39	2014
CONMEBOL	(Paraguay) Gustavo Domínguez	43	2012
CONMEBOL	(Brazil) Lucas Estevão	35	2017
CONMEBOL	(Uruguay) Aecio Fernández	38	2018
CONMEBOL	(Peru) Mickie Palomino	39	2012
CONMEBOL	(Argentina) Mariano Romo	40	2013

Confederation	Referee	Age	Qualified
OFC	(French Polynesia) Aurélien Planchais-Godefroy	40	2018
UEFA
UEFA	(France) Sofien Benchabane	36	2011
UEFA	(Russia) Roman Borisov	40	2014
UEFA	(Spain) Francisco de Oses Bumedien	29	2018
UEFA	(Portugal) Sergio Gomes Soares	42	2014
UEFA	(Lithuania) Vitalij Gomolko	31	2015
UEFA	(Azerbaijan) Ingilab Mammadov	37	2012
UEFA	(Italy) Gionni Matticoli	46	2012
UEFA	(Poland) Łukasz Ostrowski	35	2012

== Squads ==
Each team had to name a preliminary squad of between 12 and 18 players. From the preliminary squad, the team had to name a final squad of 14 players (three of whom must have been goalkeepers) by the FIFA deadline. Players in the final squad could be replaced by a player from the preliminary squad due to "serious" injury or illness up to 24 hours prior to kickoff of the team's first match.

The final squad lists were revealed by FIFA on 13 August 2021.

== Group stage ==
In the group stage, if a match was level at the end of normal playing time, extra time should be played (one period of three minutes) and followed, if necessary, by kicks from the penalty mark to determine the winner. Each team earned three points for a win in regulation time, two points for a win in extra time, one point for a win in a penalty shoot-out, and no points for a defeat. The top two teams of each group advanced to the quarter-finals.

Tiebreakers

The rankings of teams in each group were determined as follows:

1. points obtained in all group matches;
2. goal difference in all group matches;
3. number of goals scored in all group matches;

If two or more teams were equal on the basis of the above three criteria, their rankings were determined as follows:

4. points obtained in the group matches between the teams concerned;
5. goal difference in the group matches between the teams concerned;
6. number of goals scored in the group matches between the teams concerned;
7. fair play points in all group matches (only one deduction could be applied to a player in a single match):
  - Yellow card: −1 points;
  - Indirect red card (second yellow card): −3 points;
  - Direct red card: −4 points;
  - Yellow card and direct red card: −5 points;
8. drawing of lots by the FIFA Organising Committee.

The match schedule was published on the 8 July, following the draw.

All times are local, MSK (UTC+3).

=== Group A ===
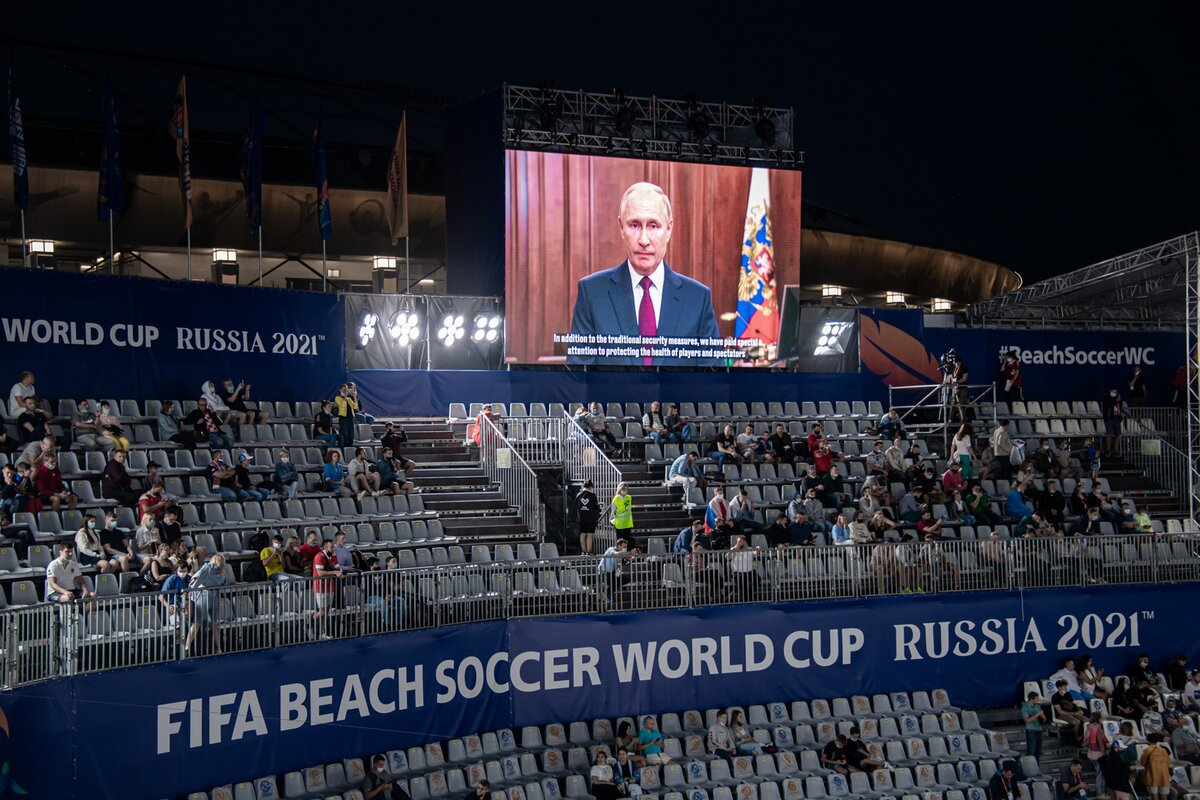
Russian president Vladimir Putin addresses the crowd via pre-recorded video before hosts RFU's opening match.

Pos	Team	Pld	W	W+	WP	L	GF	GA	GD	Pts	Qualification
1	RFU (H)	3	1	1	1	0	16	9	+7	6	Knockout stage
2	Japan	3	2	0	0	1	12	14	−2	6	Knockout stage
3	Paraguay	3	1	0	0	2	17	15	+2	3	
4	United States	3	0	0	0	3	11	18	−7	0	

Source: BSWW and FIFA
Rules for classification: Tiebreakers
(H) Host
19 August 2021
16:30

Paraguay	4–7	Japan
Cantero 10'; N. Medina 10', 13'; Morán 27'	Report	Ojeda 21' (o.g.); Akaguma 26', 32', 32'; Yamauchi 29', 33' (pen.), 36'

Luzhniki Beach Soccer Arena, Moscow
Attendance: 598
Referee: Francisco de Oses Bumedien (Spain)
19 August 2021
20:30

RFU	5–4 (a.e.t.)	United States
Shkarin 17'; Nikonorov 12', 20'; Novikov 21'; Makarov 39'	Report	Perea 2', 32'; Canale 15' (pen.), 25'

Luzhniki Beach Soccer Arena, Moscow
Attendance: 2,321
Referee: Lucas Estevão (Brazil)

21 August 2021
16:30

Japan	4–3	United States
Okuyama 4'; Ozu 23'; Oba 28' (pen.); Yamauchi 31'	Report	Silveira 3'; Canale 29'; Perea 34'

Luzhniki Beach Soccer Arena, Moscow
Attendance: 1,507
Referee: Aurélien Planchais-Godefroy (Tahiti)
21 August 2021
20:30

RFU	4–4 (a.e.t.)	Paraguay
Makarov 1', 37'; Kosharnyi 18'; Nikonorov 21'	Report	Rolon 7'; M. Medina 16'; Carballo 35'; N. Medina 37' (pen.)
Penalties
Fedorov (penalty scored); Romanov (penalty scored); Nikonorov (penalty scored); Makarov (penalty scored); Krasheninnikov (penalty scored)	5–4	(penalty scored) Carballo; (penalty scored) Morán; (penalty missed) Ojeda; (penalty scored) M. Medina; (penalty scored) V. Benitez

Luzhniki Beach Soccer Arena, Moscow
Attendance: 2,500
Referee: Hany Farouk (Egypt)

23 August 2021
19:00

United States	4–9	Paraguay
Silveira 3'; Canale 15', 34'; Perea 33' (pen.)	Report	Morán 3', 15', 20'; Carballo 7', 21'; M. Medina 23'; N. Medina 25'; Cantero 33'; V. Benitez 36'

Luzhniki Beach Soccer Arena, Moscow
Attendance: 1,327
Referee: Vitalij Gomolko (Lithuania)
23 August 2021
20:30

Japan	1–7	RFU
Akaguma 32'	Report	Ozu 1' (o.g.); Paporotnyi 3', 25', 27'; Zemskov 8'; Chuzhkov 15'; Nikonorov 36'

Luzhniki Beach Soccer Arena, Moscow
Attendance: 2,500
Referee: Micke Palomino (Peru)

=== Group B ===
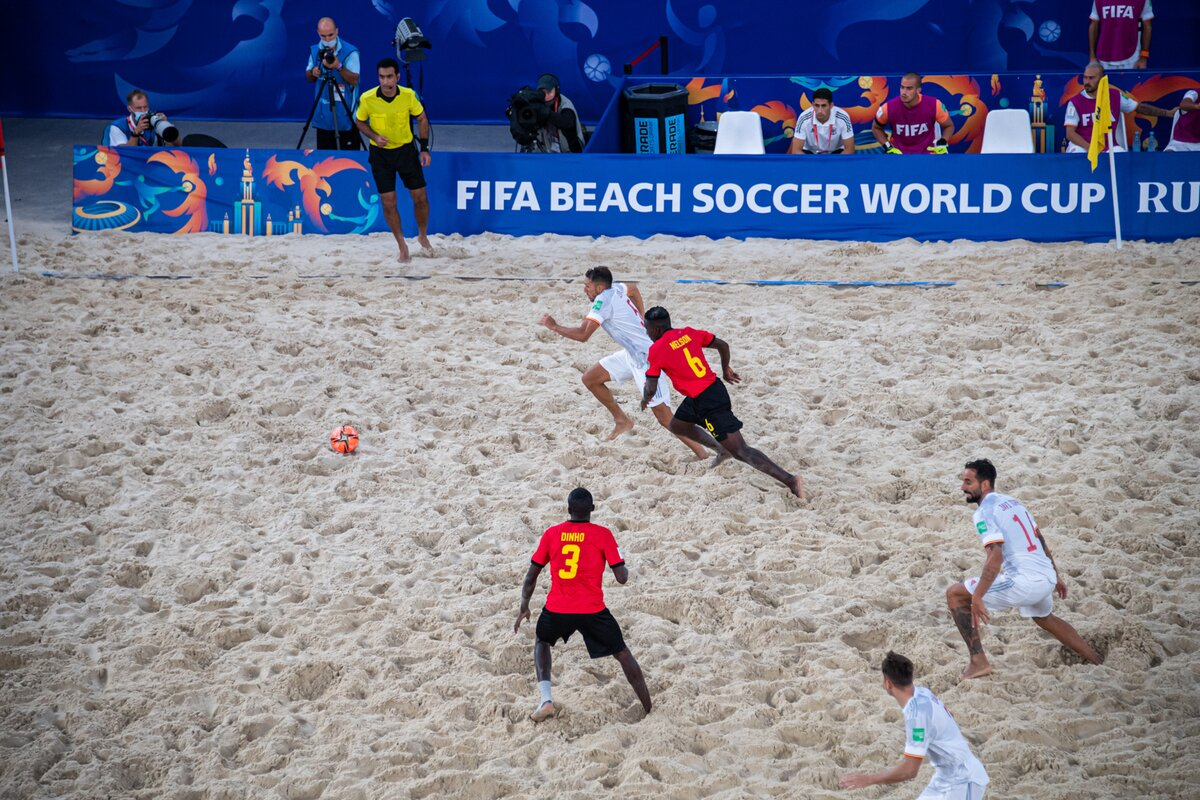
José Cintas of Spain in possession of the ball during the match against Mozambique.

Pos	Team	Pld	W	W+	WP	L	GF	GA	GD	Pts	Qualification
1	Tahiti	3	2	0	0	1	23	19	+4	6	Knockout stage
2	Spain	3	2	0	0	1	21	19	+2	6	Knockout stage
3	Mozambique	3	1	0	0	2	15	18	−3	3	
4	United Arab Emirates	3	0	1	0	2	9	12	−3	2	

Source: BSWW and FIFA
Rules for classification: Tiebreakers
19 August 2021
15:00

United Arab Emirates	4–3 (a.e.t.)	Tahiti
W. Beshr 24'; Alhammadi 25'; Paama 33' (o.g.); A. Beshr 39'	Report	Tetauira 21'; Taiarui 36'; Li 36'

Luzhniki Beach Soccer Arena, Moscow
Attendance: 472
Referee: Sérgio Gomes Soares (Portugal)
19 August 2021
19:00

Mozambique	4–8	Spain
Nelson 20'; Figo 21', 24' (pen.), 35'	Report	Antonio 6'; Chiky 8', 9' (pen.), 25'; Eduard 13', 30'; Llorenç 21'; Tivane 36' (o.g.)

Luzhniki Beach Soccer Arena, Moscow
Attendance: 953
Referee: Turki Al Salehi (Oman)

21 August 2021
15:00

Mozambique	4–2	United Arab Emirates
Figo 5', 21', 28', 33'	Report	Alhammadi 8'; A. Beshr 36'

Luzhniki Beach Soccer Arena, Moscow
Attendance: 1,031
Referee: Roman Borisov (Russia)
21 August 2021
19:00

Tahiti	12–8	Spain
Taiarui 1'; Paama 9' (pen.), 35'; Zaveroni 11', 33', 35'; Tehau 12', 15'; Salem 16', 18'; Tetauira 29', 35'	Report	Torres 5', 36'; David 13'; Chiky 14', 28'; Riduan 19', 24'; Perez 27'

Luzhniki Beach Soccer Arena, Moscow
Attendance: 1,372
Referee: Yuichi Hatano (Japan)

23 August 2021
15:00

Tahiti	8–7	Mozambique
Tehau 3'; Tetauira 4'; Salem 10', 17', 19', 24'; Paama 31'; Li 33'	Report	Tehau 4' (o.g.); Nelson 4', 17', 30'; Mussa 15'; Dez 35'; Malate 36'

Luzhniki Beach Soccer Arena, Moscow
Attendance: 814
Referee: Ingilab Mammadov (Azerbaijan)
23 August 2021
16:30

Spain	5–3	United Arab Emirates
Chiky 13'; Eduard 15'; Torres 17'; Perez 21', 30'	Report	A. Mohammad 7', 22'; Malahi 9'

Luzhniki Beach Soccer Arena, Moscow
Attendance: 1,183
Referee: Aecio Fernández (Uruguay)

=== Group C ===
Pos	Team	Pld	W	W+	WP	L	GF	GA	GD	Pts	Qualification
1	Switzerland	3	2	0	1	0	20	15	+5	7	Knockout stage
2	Brazil	3	2	0	0	1	14	7	+7	6	Knockout stage
3	Belarus	3	0	0	1	2	8	17	−9	1	
4	El Salvador	3	0	0	0	3	14	17	−3	0	

Source: BSWW and FIFA
Rules for classification: Tiebreakers
20 August 2021
16:30

Belarus	5–5 (a.e.t.)	El Salvador
Piatrouski 19'; Hapon 24', 32'; Ryabko 30', 37'	Report	Batres 2', 30'; Ramos 18', 19'; Velásquez 38'
Penalties
Bokach (penalty scored); Novikau (penalty scored); Chaikouski (penalty scored); Ryabko (penalty scored); Drozd (penalty scored)	5–4	(penalty scored) Velásquez; (penalty scored) Cruz; (penalty scored) Gonzalez; (penalty missed) Urbina; (penalty scored) Ramos

Luzhniki Beach Soccer Arena, Moscow
Attendance: 962
Referee: Suhaimi Mat Hassan (Malaysia)
20 August 2021
20:30

Switzerland	5–5 (a.e.t.)	Brazil
Borer 6', 26'; Stankovic 15', 36'; Ott 34'	Report	Edson Hulk 6'; Lucão 8'; Zé Lucas 24', 25', 27'
Penalties
Ott (penalty missed); Steinemann (penalty scored); Misev (penalty scored); Borer (penalty scored); Stankovic (penalty scored)	4–3	(penalty scored) Lucão; (penalty scored) Zé Lucas; (penalty missed) Antonio; (penalty scored) Edson Hulk; (penalty missed) Rodrigo

Luzhniki Beach Soccer Arena, Moscow
Attendance: 2,500
Referee: Said Hachim (Madagascar)

22 August 2021
16:30

Belarus	3–7	Switzerland
Novikau 7'; Hardzetski 11'; Hapon 12'	Report	Stankovic 2', 33'; Hodel 17' (pen.), 34'; Mounoud 28'; Borer 36'; Steinemann 36' (pen.)

Luzhniki Beach Soccer Arena, Moscow
Attendance: 1,856
Referee: Gionni Matticoli (Italy)
22 August 2021
19:00

Brazil	4–2	El Salvador
Rodrigo 2', 25'; Filipe 28'; Mauricinho 35'	Report	Perdomo 3' (pen.); Velásquez 18'

Luzhniki Beach Soccer Arena, Moscow
Attendance: 2,500
Referee: Sofien Benchabane (France)

24 August 2021
16:30

El Salvador	7–8	Switzerland
Velásquez 4', 13', 21'; Robles 15', 25'; Perdomo 16' (pen.); Batres 20'	Report	Looser 4'; Stankovic 10', 32', 34', 36'; Ruettimann 12'; Borer 13'; Tchatat 31'

Luzhniki Beach Soccer Arena, Moscow
Attendance: 1,049
Referee: Gustavo Domínguez (Paraguay)
24 August 2021
20:30

Brazil	5–0	Belarus
Rodrigo 3'; Edson Hulk 15'; Lucão 23' (pen.), 24'; Mauricinho 32'	Report

Luzhniki Beach Soccer Arena, Moscow
Attendance: 2,500
Referee: Juan Angeles (Dominican Republic)

=== Group D ===
Pos	Team	Pld	W	W+	WP	L	GF	GA	GD	Pts	Qualification
1	Senegal	3	2	0	0	1	13	7	+6	6	Knockout stage
2	Uruguay	3	2	0	0	1	12	14	−2	6	Knockout stage
3	Portugal	3	1	0	0	2	14	15	−1	3	
4	Oman	3	1	0	0	2	8	11	−3	3	

Source: BSWW and FIFA
Rules for classification: Tiebreakers
20 August 2021
15:00

Senegal	6–1	Uruguay
Mendy 2', 14' (pen.), 25'; Diatta 5'; Mam. Diagne 15' (pen.); Sylla 33'	Report	Bella 1' (pen.)

Luzhniki Beach Soccer Arena, Moscow
Attendance: 734
Referee: Łukasz Ostrowski (Poland)
20 August 2021
19:00

Portugal	5–3	Oman
L. Martins 2', 11', 21'; Costa 20'; Andrade 24'	Report	Al-Zadjali 11'; Al-Sinani 13'; Costa 14' (o.g.)

Luzhniki Beach Soccer Arena, Moscow
Attendance: 2,019
Referee: Mariano Romo (Argentina)

22 August 2021
15:00

Uruguay	4–2	Oman
Cabrera 7'; Laduche 14'; Guerrero 35'; L. Quinta 35'	Report	Al-Zadjali 25'; Al-Sauti 27'

Luzhniki Beach Soccer Arena, Moscow
Attendance: 1,278
Referee: Hamdi Bchir (Tunisia)
22 August 2021
20:30

Portugal	3–5	Senegal
Von 9'; Pinhal 18' (pen.); Lourenço 24'	Report	Mendy 9', 24'; Man. Diagne 11' (pen.), 33'; Diatta 35'

Luzhniki Beach Soccer Arena, Moscow
Attendance: 2,500
Referee: Gonzalo Carballo (El Salvador)

24 August 2021
15:00

Oman	3–2	Senegal
Al-Sauti 8' (pen.); Y. Al-Araimi 24'; S. Al-Oraimi 33'	Report	Balde 25'; Diatta 36'

Luzhniki Beach Soccer Arena, Moscow
Attendance: 702
Referee: Roman Borisov (Russia)
24 August 2021
19:00

Uruguay	7–6	Portugal
Bella 6', 10'; L. Quinta 9', 23', 25'; Laens 26'; Guerrero 32'	Report	L. Martins 3', 12', 16', 22', 25'; Von 5'

Luzhniki Beach Soccer Arena, Moscow
Attendance: 1,977
Referee: Said Hachim (Madagascar)

== Knockout stage ==
In the knockout stage, if a match was level at the end of normal playing time, extra time should be played (a single period of three minutes) and followed, if necessary, by kicks from the penalty mark to determine the winner.

25 and 27 August were allocated as rest days.

=== Bracket ===
Quarter-finals
26 August
RFU	4
Spain	2
26 August
Switzerland	10
Uruguay	1
26 August
Tahiti	4
Japan (a.e.t.)	5
26 August
Senegal (a.e.t.)	5
Brazil	4

Semi-finals
28 August
RFU (p)	5 (5)
Switzerland	5 (4)
28 August
Japan	5
Senegal	2

Final
29 August
RFU	5
Japan	2
Third place match
29 August
Switzerland	9
Senegal	7

=== Quarter-finals ===
26 August 2021
15:00

Senegal	5–4 (a.e.t.)	Brazil
Mam. Diagne 9'; Man. Diagne 25', 39'; Mendy 34', 38'	Report	Rodrigo 3', 39'; Catarino 21'; Zé Lucas 23'

Luzhniki Beach Soccer Arena, Moscow
Attendance: 1,628
Referee: Gionni Matticoli (Italy)

26 August 2021
16:30

Switzerland	10–1	Uruguay
Ott 3'; Borer 8', 18' (pen.); Steinemann 10'; Hodel 20', 22', 24', 34'; Stankovic 32'; Bella 36' (o.g.)	Report	Bella 11'

Luzhniki Beach Soccer Arena, Moscow
Attendance: 1,676
Referee: Juan Angeles (Dominican Republic)

26 August 2021
19:00

Tahiti	4–5 (a.e.t.)	Japan
Tetauira 20' (pen.), 37'; Chan-Kat 30'; Uesato 36' (o.g.)	Report	Tehau 4' (o.g.); Yamauchi 5' (pen.); Oba 36'; Okuyama 37'; Akaguma 38'

Luzhniki Beach Soccer Arena, Moscow
Attendance: 1,487
Referee: Sérgio Gomes Soares (Portugal)

26 August 2021
20:30

RFU	4–2	Spain
Kotenev 6'; Nikonorov 14'; Makarov 15'; Paporotnyi 34'	Report	Eduard 20'; Antonio 22'

Luzhniki Beach Soccer Arena, Moscow
Attendance: 2,500
Referee: Mariano Romo (Argentina)

=== Semi-finals ===
28 August 2021
18:00

RFU	5–5 (a.e.t.)	Switzerland
Krasheninnikov 1'; Nikonorov 5', 34'; Kotenev 14'; Shkarin 36'	Report	Ott 6'; Hodel 18', 19', 30' (pen.); Stankovic 22'
Penalties
Fedorov (penalty scored); Nikonorov (penalty scored); Shishin (penalty scored); Novikov (penalty scored); Krasheninnikov (penalty scored)	5–4	(penalty scored) Borer; (penalty missed) Steinemann; (penalty scored) Spaccarotella; (penalty scored) Hodel; (penalty scored) Stankovic

Luzhniki Beach Soccer Arena, Moscow
Attendance: 2,500
Referee: Ingilab Mammadov (Azerbaijan)

28 August 2021
19:30

Japan	5–2	Senegal
Akaguma 15' (pen.), 29', 33'; Oba 27'; Okuyama 27'	Report	Fall 26'; Boye 32'

Luzhniki Beach Soccer Arena, Moscow
Attendance: 1,950
Referee: Łukasz Ostrowski (Poland)

=== Third place match ===
29 August 2021
18:00

Switzerland	9–7	Senegal
Borer 9'; Hodel 11', 34', 36'; Mounoud 10', 16'; Spaccarotella 21'; Ott 21', 36' (pen.)	Report	Sylla 3'; Diatta 9', 13', 36'; Mam. Diagne 10'; Ndour 14'; Man. Diagne 33'

Luzhniki Beach Soccer Arena, Moscow
Attendance: 1,753
Referee: Micke Palomino (Peru)

=== Final ===
29 August 2021
19:30

RFU	5–2	Japan
Zemskov 4'; Krasheninnikov 13', 34'; Novikov 15'; Paporotnyi 19'	Report	Akaguma 13', 17' (pen.)

Luzhniki Beach Soccer Arena, Moscow
Attendance: 2,500
Referee: Suhaimi Mat Hassan (Malaysia)

== Awards ==
After the final, FIFA presented individual awards to the three best players of the tournament, three top goalscorers, and to the best goalkeeper. In addition, a collective award was given to the team with the most points in the Fair Play ranking. Following this, the winners' trophy was awarded to RFU's team.

=== Winners ===
2021 FIFA Beach Soccer World Cup
winners

RFU
Third title
3rd world title

=== Individual awards ===
The individual awards were all sponsored by Adidas, except for the FIFA Fair Play Award. The Golden, Silver and Bronze Balls were awarded by FIFA's Technical Study Group, which includes former players such as Claude Barrabe, Matteo Marrucci and Pascal Zuberbühler.

Golden Ball	Silver Ball	Bronze Ball
(Switzerland) Noël Ott	(Russia) Artur Paporotnyi	(Senegal) Raoul Mendy
Golden Scorer	Silver Scorer	Bronze Scorer
(Switzerland) Glenn Hodel (12 goals)	(Switzerland) Dejan Stankovic (10 goals)	(Japan) Takuya Akaguma (10 goals)
Golden Glove
(Switzerland) Eliott Mounoud
FIFA Fair Play Award
Brazil

== Statistics ==
=== Goalscorers ===
There were 302 goals scored in 32 matches, for an average of 9.44 goals per match.

12 goals

- (Switzerland) Glenn Hodel

10 goals

- (Japan) Takuya Akaguma
- (Switzerland) Dejan Stankovic

8 goals

- (Portugal) Léo Martins

7 goals

- (Mozambique) Figo
- (Russia) Boris Nikonorov
- (Senegal) Raoul Mendy
- (Switzerland) Philipp Borer

6 goals

- (Senegal) Ninou Diatta
- (Spain) Chiky Ardil
- (French Polynesia) Heirauarii Salem
- (French Polynesia) Tamatoa Tetauira

5 goals

- (Brazil) Rodrigo
- (El Salvador) Frank Velásquez
- (Japan) Shusei Yamauchi
- (Russia) Artur Paporotnyi
- (Senegal) Mandione Diagne
- (Switzerland) Noël Ott
- (United States) Alessandro Canale

4 goals

- (Brazil) Zé Lucas
- (Mozambique) Nelson Manuel
- (Paraguay) Pedro Morán
- (Russia) Aleksey Makarov
- (Spain) Eduard Suárez
- (United States) Nicolas Perea
- (Uruguay) Nicolas Bella
- (Uruguay) Luis Quinta

3 goals

- (Belarus) Aleh Hapon
- (Brazil) Lucão
- (El Salvador) Ruben Batres
- (Japan) Takaaki Oba
- (Japan) Masanori Okuyama
- (Paraguay) Sixto Cantero
- (Paraguay) Nestor Medina
- (Russia) Yuri Krasheninnikov
- (Senegal) Mamour Diagne
- (Spain) Pablo Perez
- (Spain) Javier Torres
- (Switzerland) Eliott Mounoud
- (French Polynesia) Dylan Paama
- (French Polynesia) Teaonui Tehau
- (French Polynesia) Teva Zaveroni

2 goals

- (Belarus) Anatoliy Ryabko
- (Brazil) Edson Hulk
- (Brazil) Mauricinho
- (El Salvador) Exxon Perdomo
- (El Salvador) Heber Ramos
- (El Salvador) Elmer Robles
- (Oman) Abdullah Al-Sauti
- (Oman) Nooh Al-Zadjali
- (Paraguay) Carlos Carballo
- (Paraguay) Miciades Medina
- (Portugal) Von
- (Russia) Maxim Chuzhkov
- (Russia) Andrey Kotenev
- (Russia) Andrei Novikov
- (Russia) Anton Shkarin
- (Russia) Fedor Zemskov
- (Senegal) Mamadou Sylla
- (Spain) Riduan Dris Bouzian
- (Spain) Antonio Mayor
- (Switzerland) Tobias Steinemann
- (French Polynesia) Raimana Li Fung Kuee
- (French Polynesia) Heimanu Taiarui
- (United Arab Emirates) Hasan Alhammadi
- (United Arab Emirates) Ahmed Beshr
- (United Arab Emirates) Ali Mohammad
- (United States) Gabriel Silveira
- (Uruguay) Alejandro Guerrero

1 goal

- (Belarus) Yahor Hardzetski
- (Belarus) Yauheni Novikau
- (Belarus) Yury Piatrouski
- (Brazil) Catarino
- (Brazil) Filipe
- (Japan) Ozu Moreira
- (Mozambique) Dez
- (Mozambique) Yuran Malate
- (Mozambique) Bachir Mussa
- (Oman) Yahya Al-Araimi
- (Oman) Salim Al-Oraimi
- (Oman) Jalal Al-Sinani
- (Paraguay) Valentin Benitez
- (Paraguay) Yoao Rolon
- (Portugal) Elinton Andrade
- (Portugal) Fabio Costa
- (Portugal) André Lourenço
- (Portugal) Rodrigo Pinhal
- (Russia) Stanislav Kosharnyi
- (Senegal) Ibrahima Balde
- (Senegal) Pape Mar Boye
- (Senegal) Babacar Fall
- (Senegal) Papa Ndour
- (Spain) David Ardil
- (Spain) Llorenç Gómez
- (Switzerland) Benjamin Looser
- (Switzerland) Patrick Ruettimann
- (Switzerland) Sandro Spaccarotella
- (Switzerland) Kevin Tchatat
- (French Polynesia) Gervais Chan-Kat
- (United Arab Emirates) Waleed Beshr
- (United Arab Emirates) Ahmad Malahi
- (Uruguay) Matias Cabrera
- (Uruguay) Gaston Laduche
- (Uruguay) Andres Laens

1 own goal

- (Japan) Ozu Moreira (against RFU)
- (Japan) Takumi Uesato (against Tahiti)
- (Mozambique) Manuel Tivane (against Spain)
- (Paraguay) Luis Ojeda (against Japan)
- (Portugal) Fabio Costa (against Oman)
- (French Polynesia) Dylan Paama (against United Arab Emirates)
- (Uruguay) Nicolas Bella (against Switzerland)

2 own goals

- (French Polynesia) Teaonui Tehau (against Mozambique and Japan)
