= Isiaka Olawale =

Nigerian footballer (born 1983)

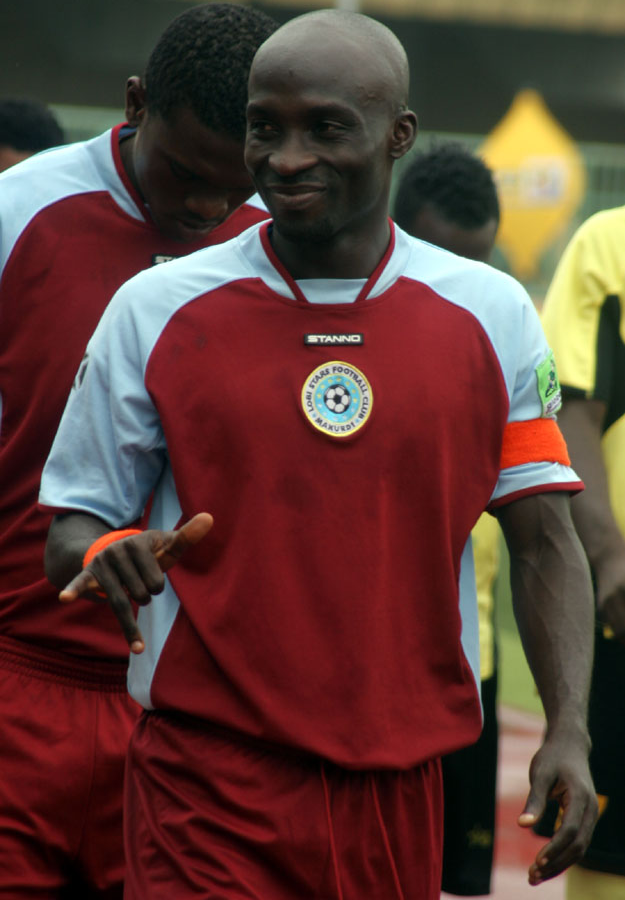
- Isiaka Olawale, 2010

Personal information
- Full name: Isiaka Olawale
- Date of birth: 11 November 1983 (age 42)
- Place of birth: Nigeria
- Height: 1.75 m (5 ft 9 in)
- Position: Midfielder

Team information
- Current team: Dolphins F.C.

Senior career*
Years	Team	Apps	(Gls)
2002–2004	Lobi Stars F.C.	48	(20)
2004–2006	WA Tlemcen	36	(3)
2006–2009	Lobi Stars F.C.	56	(13)
2009–2011	Kwara United F.C.	32	(12)
2012–	Dolphins F.C.		(1)

International career^{‡}
2006–	Nigeria (beach soccer)		
2007–2010	Nigeria	2	(0)
- * Club domestic league appearances and goals as of 21 September 2009 ‡ National team caps and goals as of 20 May 2011

Isiaka Olawale (born 11 November 1983) is a Nigerian football player. He currently plays for Dolphins F.C.

== History ==
On 25 January 2012, after protracted negotiations, Dolphins and Kwara United finally agreed on a fee for the transfer of central midfielder, Isiaka Olawale, to the league champions. Olawale got the start and scored his first club goal in the second leg of the 2012 CAF Champions League first-round game against CD Elá Nguema.

== International career ==
He has played for the Nigeria national team and the Nigeria national beach soccer team.
