= Cameroon national beach soccer team =

Beach soccer team representing Cameroon

Cameroon
- Association: Cameroonian Football Federation
- Confederation: CAF (Africa)
- Head coach: Jean Pierre Bahabege Ngwe
- FIFA code: CMR
- BSWW ranking: 89 ▲2 (1 June 2026)
First colours
Second colours

CAF Beach Soccer Championship
- Appearances: 3 (first in 2006)
- Best result: Champions (2006)

The Cameroon national beach soccer team represents Cameroon in international beach soccer competitions and is controlled by the Cameroonian Football Federation, the governing body for football in Cameroon.

== Current squad ==
Correct as of July 2008

Note: Flags indicate national team as defined under FIFA eligibility rules; some limited exceptions apply. Players may hold more than one non-FIFA nationality.

No.	Pos.	Nation	Player
1	GK		Jean Kengne
2	FW		Franck Batoum
3	DF		Bernard Nkolo
4	DF		Bertrand Abissonono
5	DF		Ekwalla Eyoum
6	FW		Bruno Ndengue

No.	Pos.	Nation	Player
7	FW		Djibril Abouem
8	DF		Joan Etame
9	FW		Eric Yopa
10	FW		Aime Yombi
11	DF		Jean-Claude Nkoumou
12	GK		Marc Belle

Coach: Jean Pierre Bahabege Ngwe

== Current staff ==
Head Delegation: Jean Louis Palla

== Achievements ==
- CAF Beach Soccer Championship: WINNERS
  - 2006
- Runners-up
  - 2008
