= Sudan women's national football team results =

The Sudan women's national football team is the representative women's association football team of Sudan. Its governing body is the Sudan Football Association (SFA) and it competes as a member of the Confederation of African Football (CAF). The national team's first international competition was in 2021, when they played in the Arab Women's Cup.

== Record per opponent ==
Key

Positive balance (more wins than losses)
Neutral balance (as many wins as losses)
Negative balance (more losses than wins)

The following table shows Sudan's all-time official international record per opponent:

Opponent	Pld	W	D	L	GF	GA	GD	W%	Confederation
Algeria	1	0	0	1	0	14	−14	0	CAF
Comoros	2	0	0	2	0	30	−30	0	CAF
Egypt	1	0	0	1	0	10	−10	0	CAF
Lebanon	1	0	0	1	1	5	−4	0	AFC
South Sudan	2	0	0	2	0	9	−9	0	CAF
Tunisia	1	0	0	1	1	12	−11	0	CAF
Total	8	0	0	8	2	80	−78	0	—

Last updated: Comoros vs Sudan, 8 June 2026.

== Results ==
=== 2021 ===
24 August 2021 Arab Women's Cup GS Group A	Egypt	10–0	Sudan	Cairo, Egypt
17:00 UTC+2	Gomaa; Ghazi; Tarek; Salem; El Zayat; Adam; Elmitwalli	Report		Stadium: Police Academy Stadium; Referee: Doumouh Al Bakkar (Lebanon)

27 August 2021 Arab Women's Cup GS Group A	Sudan	1–12	Tunisia	Cairo, Egypt
17:00 UTC+2	Abdelmoneim	Report	Jeddi; Mchara; Ouni; Maknoun; Masoud; Jemaii; Aboud; Hattab	Stadium: Police Academy Stadium; Referee: Haneen Murad (Jordan)

30 August 2021 Arab Women's Cup GS Group A	Lebanon	5–1	Sudan	Cairo, Egypt
21:00 UTC+2	Al Kasti 3', 19'; Maalouf 6'; Salha 26', 44'	Report	Ragab 50'	Stadium: Police Academy Stadium; Referee: Khuloud Al-Zaabi (United Arab Emirates)

20 October 2021 2022 AFWCON qualification First round 1st leg	Algeria	14–0	Sudan	Algiers, Algeria
18:00 (UTC+1)	Oum Srir 2' (o.g.); Bouhenni 6', 15', 37', 46'; Koui 11', 67'; Bouzid 17', 18'; Ould Braham 29', 30'; Belkacemi 48'; Bara 67'; Merrouche 82'	Report		Stadium: Omar Hamadi Stadium; Referee: Asma Chouchane (Tunisia)

26 October 2021 2022 AFWCON qualification First round 2nd leg	Sudan	Cancelled (Note: Originally to be played at the Al Hilal Stadium in Omdurman, the Sudan v Algeria match was postponed and later cancelled due to security concerns following the October 2021 Sudanese coup d'état.)	Algeria	Omdurman, Sudan
		Report		Stadium: Al Hilal Stadium

=== 2022 ===
16 February 2022 Friendly	Sudan	0–6	South Sudan	Khartoum, Sudan
15:15 UTC+2		Report	Deborah Stephen (??); Chiang Tomas (??); Diana Padonyi (??)	Stadium: Jebel Aulia Stadium

20 February 2022 Friendly	Sudan	0–3	South Sudan	Khartoum, Sudan
17:00 UTC+2		Report	Deborah Stephen (??); Sarah Aparo (??); Chiang Tomas (??)	Stadium: Jebel Aulia Stadium

=== 2023 ===
September 2023 2024 AFWCON qualification First round 1st leg	Angola	Cancelled	Sudan

September 2023 2024 AFWCON qualification First round 2nd leg	Sudan	Cancelled	Angola

=== 2026 ===
4 June 2026 2028 Olympic Qualification First round	Sudan	0–17	Comoros	Casablanca, Morocco
15:00 UTC+3		Report	Saïd Madjiri 8'; Al. Saïd 17', 42'; Boina Ali 31', 39', 54'; H. Ahamada 33', 49', 66', 89'; Dahmani 37'; Housseni 46'; Maoulida 52'; Anduma 56'; Houmadi 59', 87'; D. Saïd 69'	Stadium: Larbi Zaouli Stadium; Referee: Suzana Semere Yohannes (Eritrea)

8 June 2026 2028 Olympic Qualification First round	Comoros	13–0 (30–0 agg.)	Sudan	Casablanca, Morocco
18:00 UTC+1	Houmadi 12', 26', 67', 71'; Hadhirami Ali 40'; Maoulida 48', 62'; Haoudadji 53'; D. Saïd 57'; Ali 75'; H. Ahamada 85', 90+6'; Hassani 90+4'	Report		Stadium: Larbi Zaouli Stadium; Referee: Seonyatseng Tshephe (Botswana)

== See also ==
- Sudan national football team results
- List of Sudan women's international footballers
