= 2015 CAF Women's Olympic qualifying tournament =

2015 CAF Women's Olympic Qualifying Tournament
Tournament details
- Dates: 22 May – 18 October 2015
- Teams: 18 (from 1 confederation)

Tournament statistics
- Matches played: 20
- Goals scored: 48 (2.4 per match)
- Top scorer(s): (Equatorial Guinea) Jade (South Africa) Jermaine Seoposenwe (5 goals each)

The 2015 CAF Women's Olympic Qualifying Tournament was the fourth edition of the CAF Women's Olympic Qualifying Tournament, the quadrennial international football competition organised by the Confederation of African Football (CAF) to determine which women's national teams from Africa qualify for the Olympic football tournament.

The top two teams of the tournament qualified for the 2016 Summer Olympics women's football tournament in Brazil as the CAF representatives.

South Africa qualified for the second Olympics in a row, while Zimbabwe qualified for the first time.

== Teams ==
A total of 18 CAF member national teams entered the qualifying rounds.

Round	Teams entering round	No. of teams
First round	Gabon; Guinea-Bissau; Liberia; Libya	4
Second round	Botswana; Cameroon; Congo; Egypt; Equatorial Guinea; Ghana; Ivory Coast; Kenya; Mali; Nigeria; South Africa; Tunisia; Zambia; Zimbabwe	14
Qualifying rounds	Total	18

Did not enter
- Algeria
- Angola
- Benin
- Burkina Faso
- Burundi
- Cape Verde
- Central African Republic
- Chad
- Comoros
- Djibouti
- DR Congo
- Eritrea
- Ethiopia
- Gambia
- Guinea
- Lesotho
- Madagascar
- Malawi
- Mauritania
- Mauritius
- Morocco
- Mozambique
- Namibia
- Niger
- Rwanda
- São Tomé and Príncipe
- Senegal
- Seychelles
- Sierra Leone
- Somalia
- South Sudan
- Sudan
- Swaziland
- Tanzania
- Togo
- Uganda

== Format ==
Qualification ties were played on a home-and-away two-legged basis. If the aggregate score was tied after the second leg, the away goals rule would be applied, and if still level, extra time would be played. The away goals rule would again be applied after extra time, and if still level, the penalty shoot-out would be used to determine the winner.

The two winners of the fourth round qualified for the Olympic football tournament.

== Schedule ==
The schedule of the qualifying rounds was as follows.

Round	Leg	Date
First round	First leg	24–26 April 2015
First round	Second leg	8–10 May 2015
Second round	First leg	22–24 May 2015
Second round	Second leg	29–31 May 2015
Third round	First leg	17–19 July 2015
Third round	Second leg	31 July–2 August 2015
Fourth round	First leg	2–4 October 2015
Fourth round	Second leg	16–18 October 2015

== First round ==
Team 1	Agg.	Team 2	1st leg	2nd leg
Guinea-Bissau	w/o	Liberia	—	—
Gabon	w/o	Libya	—	—

Note: Guinea-Bissau and Libya withdrew.

24 April 2015

Guinea-Bissau	Cancelled	Liberia
	Report

8 May 2015

Liberia	Cancelled	Guinea-Bissau
	Report

Liberia won on walkover.

24 April 2015

Gabon	Cancelled	Libya
	Report

8 May 2015

Libya	Cancelled	Gabon
	Report

Gabon won on walkover.

== Second round ==
Team 1	Agg.	Team 2	1st leg	2nd leg
Liberia	w/o	Cameroon	—	—
Egypt	1–4	Ghana	1–1	0–3
Ivory Coast	w/o	Tunisia	—	—
Zambia	2–2 (a)	Zimbabwe	2–1	0–1
Gabon	2–8	South Africa	2–3	0–5
Botswana	2–2 (a)	Kenya	2–1	0–1
Nigeria	w/o	Mali	—	—
Congo	0–7	Equatorial Guinea	0–3	0–4

Note: Liberia, Mali and Tunisia withdrew. Liberia because of administrative reasons, due to Ebola outbreak (initially to play home match in Cameroon). Nigeria versus Mali and Liberia versus Cameroon were to be played in early/mid-May so Nigeria and Cameroon were able to leave earlier for the World Cup.

2 May 2015

Liberia	Cancelled	Cameroon
	Report

Stade Ahmadou Ahidjo, Yaoundé
8 May 2015

Cameroon	Cancelled	Liberia
	Report

Stade Ahmadou Ahidjo, Yaoundé

Cameroon won on walkover.

23 May 2015
17:30 UTC+2

Egypt	1–1	Ghana
Ahmed 90' (pen.)	Report	Boakye 26'

Petro Sport Stadium, Cairo
31 May 2015
15:00 UTC±0

Ghana	3–0	Egypt
Boakye 53'; Ayieyam 85'; Addo 88'	Report

Accra Sports Stadium, Accra

Ghana won 4–1 on aggregate.

22 May 2015

Ivory Coast	Cancelled	Tunisia
	Report

29 May 2015

Tunisia	Cancelled	Ivory Coast
	Report

Ivory Coast won on walkover.

24 May 2015
15:00 UTC+2

Zambia	2–1	Zimbabwe
Mubanga 12'; Banda 15'	Report	Neshamba 48'

Nkoloma Stadium, Lusaka
31 May 2015
15:00 UTC+2

Zimbabwe	1–0	Zambia
Muzongondi 24'	Report

Rufaro Stadium, Harare

2–2 on aggregate. Zimbabwe won on away goals.

23 May 2015
15:30 UTC+1

Gabon	2–3	South Africa
Mapangou 3' (pen.); Louise 70'	Report	Seoposenwe 26', 35'; Mollo 75'

Stade Augustin Monédan de Sibang, Libreville
31 May 2015
15:00 UTC+2

South Africa	5–0	Gabon
Seoposenwe 8', 58'; Dlamini 22'; Jane 24'; Mollo 77'	Report

Dobsonville Stadium, Johannesburg

South Africa won 8–2 on aggregate.

22 May 2015
16:00 UTC+2

Botswana	2–1	Kenya
Tholakele 20'; Keleboge 30'	Report	Kinuthia 90+3'

Lobatse Stadium, Lobatse
31 May 2015
15:30 UTC+3

Kenya	1–0	Botswana
Shikobe 90'	Report

Kenyatta Stadium, Machakos

2–2 on aggregate. Kenya won on away goals.

9 May 2015

Nigeria	Cancelled	Mali
	Report

Abuja National Stadium, Abuja
Referee: Maniyela Edu Okomo (Equatorial Guinea)
16 May 2015

Mali	Cancelled	Nigeria
	Report

Nigeria won on walkover.

23 May 2015
15:30 UTC+1

Congo	0–3	Equatorial Guinea
	Report	Jumária 6'; Jade 10', 19'

Stade de Kinkala, Kinkala
31 May 2015
16:00 UTC+1

Equatorial Guinea	4–0	Congo
Jade (?) ? (?)	Report

Estadio de Bata, Bata

Equatorial Guinea won 7–0 on aggregate.

== Third round ==
Team 1	Agg.	Team 2	1st leg	2nd leg
Cameroon	3–3 (a)	Ghana	1–1	2–2
Ivory Coast	w/o	Zimbabwe	3–0 (awd.)	—
South Africa	2–0	Kenya	1–0	1–0
Nigeria	2–3	Equatorial Guinea	1–1	1–2 (a.e.t.)

Note: Zimbabwe failed to secure the necessary funds to travel for the first leg, and FIFA awarded the match 3–0 to Ivory Coast. It was initially indicated by the CAF that Ivory Coast won the tie and the second leg was cancelled, but this was overturned by FIFA. Ivory Coast then failed to show up for the original second leg, but they were not punished, and the second leg was rescheduled. Ivory Coast then withdrew from the tie before the rescheduled second leg.

18 July 2015
15:30 UTC+1

Cameroon	1–1	Ghana
Manie 54'	Report	Myles 25'

Stade Ahmadou Ahidjo, Yaoundé
1 August 2015
15:00 UTC±0

Ghana	2–2	Cameroon
Suleman 15'; Boakye 47'	Report	Ngono Mani 44'; Nkada 83'

Accra Sports Stadium, Accra

3–3 on aggregate. Cameroon won on away goals.

19 July 2015
15:00 UTC±0

Ivory Coast	3–0 Awarded	Zimbabwe
	Report

Stade Robert Champroux, Abidjan
23 August 2015
15:00 UTC+2

Zimbabwe	Cancelled	Ivory Coast
	Report

Rufaro Stadium, Harare

Zimbabwe won on walkover.

18 July 2015
15:00 UTC+2

South Africa	1–0	Kenya
Ramalepe 75'	Report

Dobsonville Stadium, Johannesburg
2 August 2015
15:30 UTC+3

Kenya	0–1	South Africa
	Report	Mulaudzi 24'

Kenyatta Stadium, Machakos

South Africa won 2–0 on aggregate.

18 July 2015
16:00 UTC+1

Nigeria	1–1	Equatorial Guinea
Ayinde 27'	Report	Chinasa 62'

Abuja National Stadium, Abuja
2 August 2015
16:00 UTC+1

Equatorial Guinea	2–1 (a.e.t.)	Nigeria
Chuigoué 86'; Añonma 112'	Report	Okobi 12'

Estadio de Bata, Bata

Equatorial Guinea won 3–2 on aggregate.

== Fourth round ==
Winners qualified for 2016 Summer Olympics.

Team 1	Agg.	Team 2	1st leg	2nd leg
Cameroon	2–2 (a)	Zimbabwe	2–1	0–1
South Africa	1–0	Equatorial Guinea	0–0	1–0

3 October 2015
15:00 UTC+1

Cameroon	2–1	Zimbabwe
Ngono Mani 69', 81'	Report	Neshamba 6'

Stade Ahmadou Ahidjo, Yaoundé
18 October 2015
15:00 UTC+2

Zimbabwe	1–0	Cameroon
Neshamba 8'	Report

Rufaro Stadium, Harare

2–2 on aggregate. Zimbabwe won on away goals.

3 October 2015
15:00 UTC+2

South Africa	0–0	Equatorial Guinea
	Report

Makhulong Stadium, Johannesburg
18 October 2015
16:00 UTC+1

Equatorial Guinea	0–1	South Africa
	Report	Seoposenwe 62'

Estadio de Bata, Bata

South Africa won 1–0 on aggregate.

== Qualified teams for Olympics ==
The following two teams from CAF qualified for the Olympic football tournament.

Team	Qualified on	Previous appearances in tournament^{1}
Zimbabwe	18 October 2015	0 (debut)
South Africa	18 October 2015	1 (2012)

^{1} Bold indicates champion for that year. Italic indicates host for that year.

== Goalscorers ==
5 goals

- (Equatorial Guinea) Jade
- (South Africa) Jermaine Seoposenwe

3 goals

- (Cameroon) Madeleine Ngono Mani
- (Ghana) Portia Boakye
- (Zimbabwe) Rudo Neshamba

2 goals

- (South Africa) Sanah Mollo

1 goal

- (Botswana) Lesego Keleboge
- (Botswana) Refilwe Tholakele
- (Cameroon) Christine Manie
- (Cameroon) Agnès Nkada
- (Egypt) Engy Ahmed
- (Equatorial Guinea) Genoveva Añonma
- (Equatorial Guinea) Gloria Chinasa
- (Equatorial Guinea) Dorine Chuigoué
- (Equatorial Guinea) Jumária
- (Gabon) Yog Atouth Louise
- (Gabon) Winnie Mapangou
- (Ghana) Elizabeth Addo
- (Ghana) Jane Ayieyam
- (Ghana) Samira Suleman
- (Ghana) Mercy Myles
- (Kenya) Mary Kinuthia
- (Kenya) Dorcas Shikobe
- (Nigeria) Halimatu Ayinde
- (Nigeria) Ngozi Okobi
- (South Africa) Amanda Dlamini
- (South Africa) Refiloe Jane
- (South Africa) Rhoda Mulaudzi
- (South Africa) Lebogang Ramalepe
- (Zambia) Barbara Banda
- (Zambia) Hellen Mubanga
- (Zimbabwe) Felistas Muzongondi

Note: One goal scored by Equatorial Guinea missing goalscorer information.
