= Women's football in Sudan =

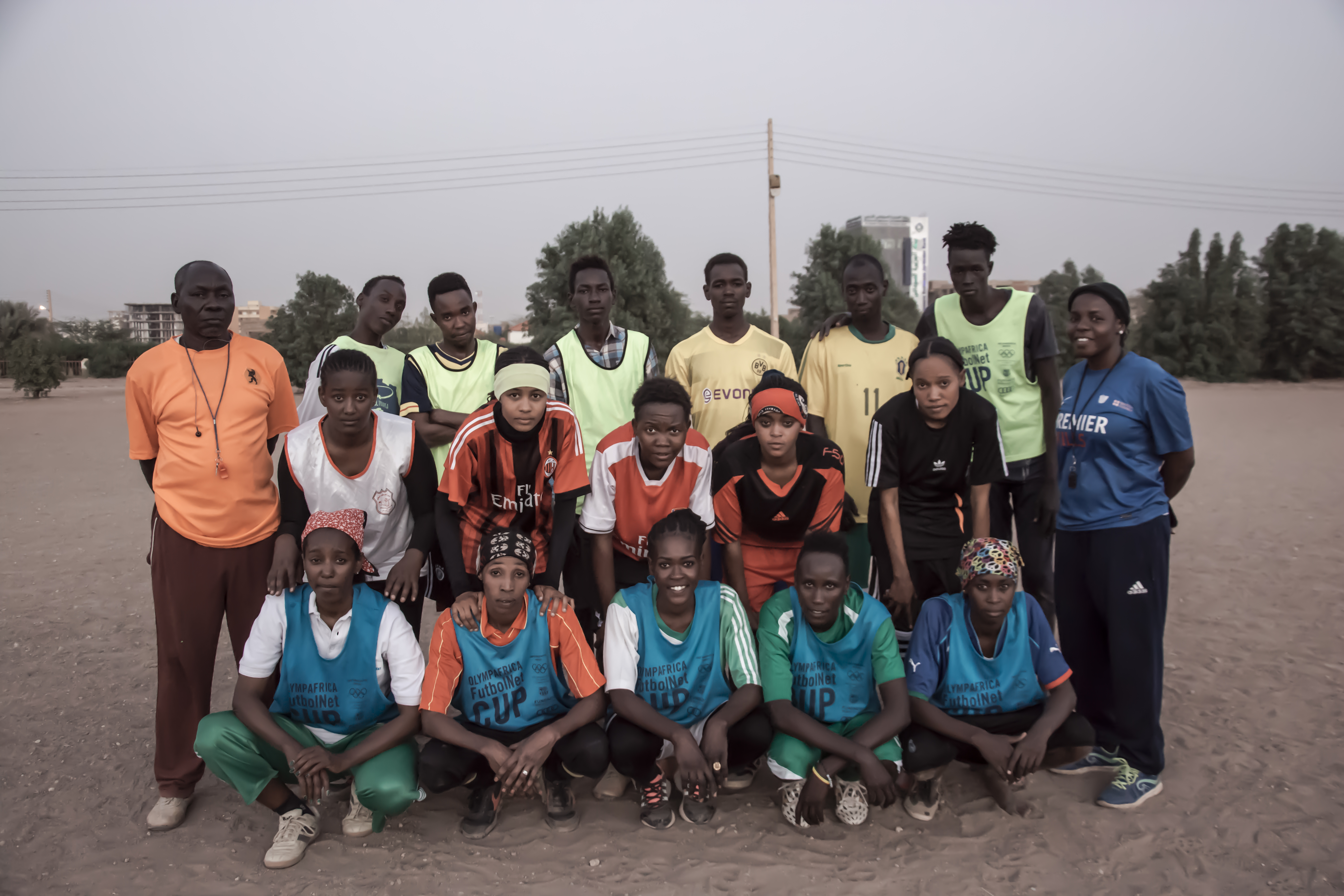
- The Challenge, the unofficial Sudanese women's national team, in 2018
- Country: Sudan
- Governing body: Sudan Football Association
- National team: Women's national team
- First played: 2019
- Clubs: 21 (2019)

National competitions
- FIFA Women's World Cup; Women's Africa Cup of Nations; Arab Women's Cup

International competitions
- CAF Women's Champions League

Women in Sudan were not allowed to officially participate in sports such as football, until the revolution of 2018–19 abolished the former restrictive public order laws. In September 2019, a women's league with 21 teams from different cities in Sudan was established, with Wala'a Essam al-Boushi, the Sudanese Minister of Youth and Sport, saying the transitional government will "make women's sports one of the pillars of the country's development."

== History ==
=== Background ===
Women's football in Africa in general faces many challenges, including limited access to education, poverty amongst women and fundamental inequalities that also causes female specific human rights abuses. At the same time, when female players in Africa have become successful, some leave their home countries to seek greater opportunities in places such as Europe or the United States. Funding for women's football in Africa is an issue, as most of the funding comes from FIFA, not the National Football Association.

The Sudan Football Association, which was founded in 1946, and became FIFA affiliated in 1948, was one of the founding members of the Confederation of African Football (CAF), and continues to be a member of the Confederation. In 2006, there were 440 men's clubs for football in Sudan. In November 2011, a female association member, Laila Khalid from Palestine, attended a meeting in South Africa where women's football was discussed, specifically mentioning the problems faced in growing the game in Africa.

Since its official recognition in 2019, Sudan joined other countries in the Arab and African regions to have a women's league. Due to its membership in the Union of Arab Football Associations (UAFA), the national team's first international competition was in 2021, when they played in the Arab Women's Cup.

Before Sudan's first official women's football league was organized in September 2019, there had been several women's teams in major cities such as Khartoum. Under the so-called Public Order Laws of the Islamist governments of the time, these teams were formed a few years before 2019 in an unofficial way, received no support by the Sudan Football Association and had to train and play under difficult conditions. Women's sports like football were further restricted, because a fatwa (religious ruling) by the Islamic Fiqh Council in 2006 condemned the creation of a women's league in Sudan. Further, common social attitudes towards women do not favour women in sports, and support by their families is an important requirement for them.

In the mainly Christian southern part of Sudan in 2006, the local government indicated their support of women's football, and a competition with teams from all the ten states of modern-day South Sudan was organized in the southern region's capital, Juba. Following the independence of South Sudan in 2011, a women's national football team was created the same year. Responding to the interest in women's football matches in Arab-speaking countries, the rights to broadcast the 2011 Women's World Cup were bought by Al Jazeera.

=== Beginnings of women's football since the early 2000s ===
According to a 2011 study of the relationship between religious fundamentalism and globalized societies, the fact that some Sudanese women already had started playing football since the early 2000s despite social and legal restrictions was considered a critical step for the development of an unofficial women's league. As part of this informal league, a first national women's team called The Challenge was created in 2006 in Khartoum. Different from other teams that demanded players to wear headscarves and long trousers, the players of The Challenge did not cover their heads or wear long clothes. At the time, all women's football clubs were not recognized, nor received support from the Sudan Football Association. In 2006, The Challenge played its first competitive match. It was captained by Sara Edward and played against a team from Sudan University that wore clothes corresponding to Islamic norms. As reported, the quality of play was not high and the game ended in a 2–0 win for The Challenge team. By 2009, there were ten senior women's teams, a school-based competition and a regional competition were established. Young girls informally also have been playing the game in refugee camps in the Darfur region.

In response to a question from FIFA regarding the feasibility of creating a women's national team in 2012, the Islamic Fiqh Council issued another fatwa against the creation of a women's soccer team, deeming it an immoral act. The fatwa claimed that football was a men's sport and women should not participate in it, because it challenges the differences between men and women.

=== Recognition in 2019 ===
Following the establishment of a women's league in 2019 with 21 teams from different cities under the new transitional government, the Sudan Football Association recognized and started to support women's local and national teams. As of 2021, Sudan's women's national team continued to lack FIFA recognition. By August of that year, however, it had been recognized by the Confederation of African Football (CAF) and was invited to participate in the 2021 Arab Women's Cup.

=== 2026 return ===
The Sudan women's national under-17 football team made its international debut in June 2026 in Morocco.

== See also ==
- Football in Sudan
- List of women's association football clubs in Sudan
