= Union of Arab Football Associations =

Governing body for football in the Arab world

Union of Arab Football Associations الإتحاد العربي لكرة القدم

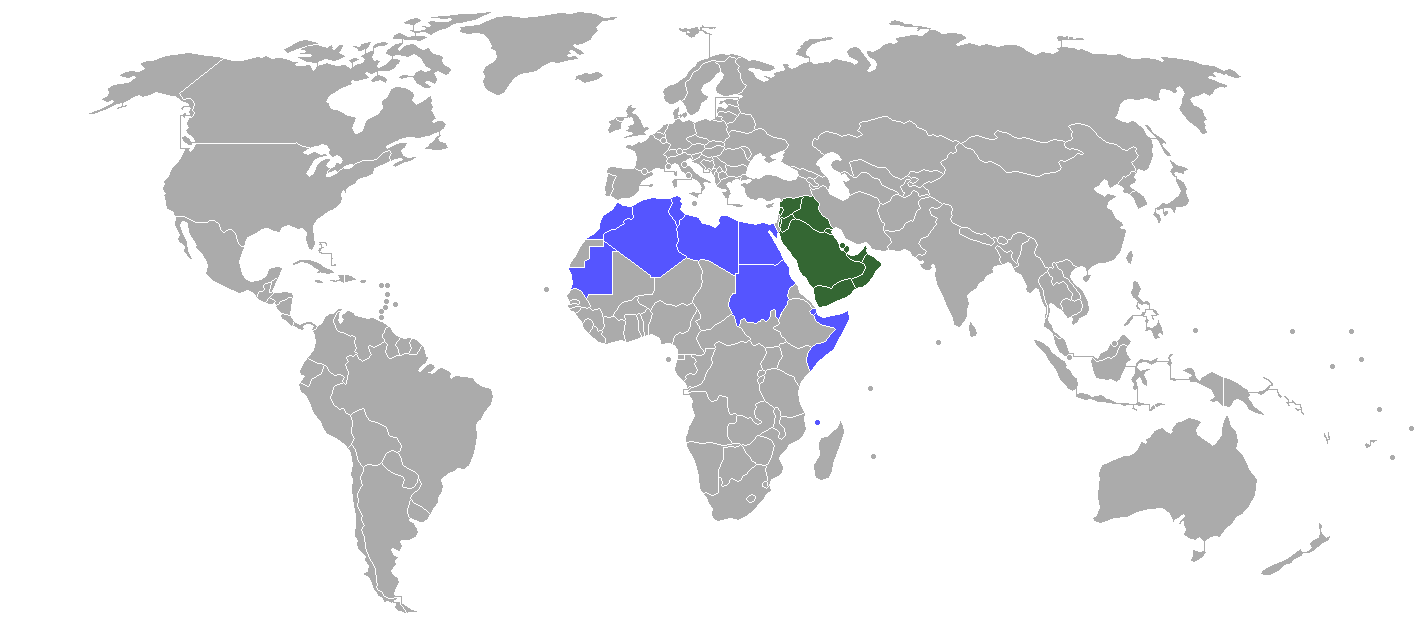
- Members from Asia Members from Africa
- Formation: 27 January 1974; 52 years ago
- Type: Independent intercontinental body
- Headquarters: Riyadh, Saudi Arabia
- Region served: Arab world
- Members: 22 members: Saudi Arabia; Algeria; Bahrain; Comoros; Djibouti; Egypt; Iraq; Jordan; Kuwait; Lebanon; Libya; Mauritania; Morocco; Oman; Palestine; Qatar; Somalia; Sudan; Syria; Tunisia; United Arab Emirates; Yemen
- Official language: Arabic
- President: (Saudi Arabia) Abdulaziz bin Turki
- Website: uafa-ac.com

The Union of Arab Football Associations (Arabic: الاتحاد العربي لكرة القدم; French: Union des associations de football arabe), also known by its acronym UAFA, is the governing body for football in the Arab world and an independent intercontinental body comprising 22 member states of the Arab League: twelve from Asia and ten from Africa. Established in 1974, the UAFA is affiliated with FIFA; however, it is not directly affiliated with the AFC or CAF.

The UAFA organises competitions for men's and women's national teams and clubs, its premier competitions for national teams are the Arab Cup, which is directly organised by FIFA since 2021, and the Arab Women's Cup. Its premier club competition is the Arab Club Champions Cup.

== History ==
The Union of Arab Football Associations (UAFA) was established on 27 January 1974 in Tripoli, Libya. In 1976, a general assembly was held in Damascus, Syria, and the football association headquarters were transferred to their present seat in Riyadh, Saudi Arabia.

== Presidents ==
Period	Name
1974–1976	(Libya) Abdul Latif Booker
1976–1999	(Saudi Arabia) Faisal bin Fahd
1999–2011	(Saudi Arabia) Sultan bin Fahd
2011–2014	(Saudi Arabia) Nawaf bin Faisal
2014–2017	(Saudi Arabia) Turki bin Khalid
2017–2019	(Saudi Arabia) Turki Al-Sheikh
2019–present	(Saudi Arabia) Abdulaziz bin Turki

== Member associations ==
All UAFA members from the Asian Football Confederation are also members of the West Asian Football Federation (WAFF). All WAFF and Union of North African Football (UNAF) members are UAFA members.

Country	Confederation	Sub-confederation	Year
Algeria	CAF	UNAF	1974
Bahrain	AFC	WAFF	1976
Comoros	CAF	COSAFA	2003
Djibouti	CAF	CECAFA	1998
Egypt	CAF	UNAF	1974
Iraq	AFC	WAFF	1974
Jordan	AFC	WAFF	1974
Kuwait	AFC	WAFF	1976
Lebanon	AFC	WAFF	1978
Libya	CAF	UNAF	1974
Mauritania	CAF	WAFU	1989
Morocco	CAF	UNAF	1976
Oman	AFC	WAFF	1978
Palestine	AFC	WAFF	1974
Qatar	AFC	WAFF	1976
Saudi Arabia	AFC	WAFF	1974
Somalia	CAF	CECAFA	1974
Sudan	CAF	CECAFA	1978
Syria	AFC	WAFF	1974
Tunisia	CAF	UNAF	1976
United Arab Emirates	AFC	WAFF	1974
Yemen	AFC	WAFF	1978

== Competitions ==
Men's senior

- FIFA Arab Cup
- Arab Games Football Tournament
- Arab Futsal Cup
- Arab Beach Soccer Championship

Men's youth

- Arab Cup U-20
- Arab Cup U-17
- Arab Cup U-15

Women's senior and youth

- Arab Women's Cup
- Arab U-20 Women's Cup
- Arab U-17 Women's Cup

Clubs

- Arab Club Champions Cup
- Arab Cup Winners' Cup (defunct)
- Arab Super Cup (defunct)

=== Current title holders ===
Competition	Edition	Champions	Title	Runners-up	Next edition	Dates
Men's national teams
Arab Cup	2025	Morocco	2nd	Jordan	2029	TBD
Arab Cup U-20	2022	Saudi Arabia	2nd	Egypt	TBD	TBD
Arab Cup U-17	2022	Algeria	1st	Morocco	2027	1 April - 17 April
Football at the Arab Games	2023	Saudi Arabia	1st	Syria	2027	TBD
Arab Futsal Cup	2023	Morocco	3rd	Kuwait	2027	26 September - 6 October
Arab Beach Soccer Championship	2026	Morocco	1st	Mauritania	2027	6–16 November
Women's national teams
Arab Women's Cup	2021	Jordan	1st	Tunisia	2027	2–18 September
Arab U-20 Women's Cup					TBD	TBD
Arab U-17 Women's Cup	2015	Lebanon	1st	Djibouti	2027	28 April - 14 May
Men's club teams
Arab Club Champions Cup	2023 (final)	(Saudi Arabia) Al Nassr	1st	(Saudi Arabia) Al Hilal	2027	21 July - 8 August
Arab Club Cup Futsal					TBD	TBD
Women's club teams
Women's Arab Club Cup					TBD	TBD

== FIFA World Rankings ==
=== Men's national teams ===
Rankings are calculated by FIFA.

UAFA	FIFA	Country	Points	+/−	Confederation
1	6	Morocco	1803.99	▲1	CAF
2	24	Egypt	1597.04	▲5	CAF
3	29	Algeria	1576.80	▼1	CAF
4	57	Tunisia	1426.58	▼12	CAF
5	58	Saudi Arabia	1425.52	▲3	AFC
6	59	Qatar	1411.06	▼3	AFC
7	63	Iraq	1404.17	▼6	AFC
8	68	United Arab Emirates	1370.47	0	AFC
9	73	Jordan	1350.41	▼10	AFC
10	79	Oman	1313.46	0	AFC
11	83	Syria	1283.05	▲1	AFC
12	92	Bahrain	1254.41	0	AFC
13	95	Palestine	1243.71	0	AFC
14	108	Comoros	1187.91	0	CAF
15	110	Libya	1182.08	0	CAF
16	113	Mauritania	1176.68	0	CAF
17	115	Lebanon	1172.22	0	AFC
18	117	Sudan	1157.22	0	CAF
19	133	Kuwait	1106.47	0	AFC
20	145	Yemen	1065.24	0	AFC
21	196	Djibouti	853.58	0	CAF
22	199	Somalia	839.17	0	CAF

Last updated 20 July 2026

=== Women's national teams ===
Rankings are calculated by FIFA.

UAFA	FIFA	Country	Points	+/−	Confederation
1	64	Morocco	1402.24	▼2	CAF
2	74	Algeria	1318.95	▼1	CAF
3	76	Jordan	1299.21	0	AFC
4	99	Egypt	1199.25	0	CAF
5	102	Tunisia	1197.5	▼2	CAF
6	116	Bahrain	1146.97	▼8	AFC
7	124	United Arab Emirates	1126.67	▼1	AFC
8	129	Palestine	1111.4	0	AFC
9	130	Lebanon	1100.95	0	AFC
10	157	Saudi Arabia	971.11	▲3	AFC
11	162	Syria	931.42	▼1	AFC
12	166	Iraq	910.49	0	AFC
13	187	Comoros	745.47	▲1	CAF
14	188	Libya	739.94	▼1	CAF
15	197	Djibouti	556.64	▼1	CAF
-	-	Kuwait			AFC
-	-	Qatar			AFC
-	-	Sudan			CAF
-	-	Mauritania			CAF
-	-	Somalia			CAF

Last updated 4 July 2026

== International competitions participation ==
Legend

- — CAF teams
- — AFC teams
- 1st — Champions
- 2nd — Runners-up
- 3rd — Third place
- 4th — Fourth place
- SF – Semi-final (no third place match)
- QF — Quarterfinals (1934–1938, 1954–1970, and 1986–present: knockout round of 8)
- R2 — Round 2 (1974–1978, second group stage, top 8; 1982: second group stage, top 12; 1986–2022: knockout round of 16)
- R1 — Round 1 (1930, 1950–1970 and 1986-present: group stage; 1934–1938: knockout round of 16; 1974–1982: first group stage)
- Q — Qualified for upcoming tournament
- •• — Qualified but withdrew
- • — Did not qualify
- × — Did not enter / Withdrew / Banned / Entry not accepted by FIFA
- — Hosts
- — Not affiliated to FIFA

=== FIFA World Cup ===
Team	1930 (Uruguay) (13)	1934 (Italy) (16)	1938 (France) (15)	1950 (Brazil) (13)	1954 (Switzerland) (16)	1958 (Sweden) (16)	1962 (Chile) (16)	1966 (England) (16)	1970 (Mexico) (16)	1974 (West Germany) (16)	1978 (Argentina) (16)	1982 (Spain) (24)	1986 (Mexico) (24)	1990 (Italy) (24)	1994 (United States) (24)	1998 (France) (32)	2002 (South Korea) (Japan) (32)	2006 (Germany) (32)	2010 (South Africa) (32)	2014 (Brazil) (32)	2018 (Russia) (32)	2022 (Qatar) (32)	2026 (Canada) (Mexico) (United States) (48)	2030 (Morocco) (Portugal) (Spain) (48)	2034 (Saudi Arabia) (48)	Total	inclusive WC Qual.
Algeria	Part of France							×	•	•	•	R1; 13th	R1; 22nd	•	•	•	•	•	R1; 28th	R2; 14th	•	•	R2; 30th			5	15
Egypt	×	R1; 13th	×	×	•	×	×	×	×	•	•	•	•	R1; 20th	•	•	•	•	•	•	R1; 31st	•	R3; 15th			4	16
Iraq				×	×	×	×	×	×	•	×	•	R1; 23rd	•	•	•	•	•	•	•	•	•	R1; 48th			2	12
Jordan				×	×	×	×	×	×	×	×	×	•	•	•	•	•	•	•	•	•	•	R1; 44th			1	12
Kuwait				×	×	×	×	×	×	•	•	R1; 21st	•	•	•	•	•	•	•	•	•	•	•			1	13
Morocco	Protectorate of France/Spain						•	×	R1; 14th	•	•	•	R2; 11th	•	R1; 23rd	R1; 18th	•	•	•	•	R1; 27th	4th	QF; T-7th	Q		7	16
Qatar										x	•	•	•	•	•	•	•	•	•	•	•	R1; 32nd	R1; 41st			2	13
Saudi Arabia						×	×	×	×	×	•	•	•	•	R2; 12th	R1; 28th	R1; 32nd	R1; T-28th	•	•	R1; 26th	R1; 25th	R1; 38th		Q	7	13
Tunisia	Protectorate of France						•	×	•	•	R1; 9th	•	•	•	•	R1; 26th	R1; 29th	R1; 24th	•	•	R1; 24th	R1; 21st	R1; 47th			7	16
United Arab Emirates											×	×	•	R1; 24th	•	•	•	•	•	•	•	•	•			1	10
Total	0	1	0	0	0	0	0	0	1	0	1	2	3	2	2	3	2	2	1	1	4	4	7			32	

=== FIFA Women's World Cup ===
FIFA Women's World Cup record
Team	1991 (China) (12)	1995 (Sweden) (12)	1999 (United States) (16)	2003 (United States) (16)	2007 (China) (16)	2011 (Germany) (16)	2015 (Canada) (24)	2019 (France) (24)	2023 (Australia) (New Zealand) (32)	2027 (Brazil) (32)	Apps.
Algeria	×	×	×	×	•	•	•	•	•	Q	1/10
Morocco	×	×	•	•	•	•	•	•	R2; 12th	Q	2/10
Total (2 teams)	0	0	0	0	0	0	0	0	1	2	3

=== Olympic Games ===
Nation	(France) 00	(United States) 04	(United Kingdom) 08	(Sweden) 12	(Belgium) 20	(France) 24	(Netherlands) 28	(Germany) 36	(United Kingdom) 48	(Finland) 52	(Australia) 56	(Italy) 60	(Japan) 64	(Mexico) 68	(West Germany) 72	(Canada) 76	(Soviet Union) 80	(United States) 84	(South Korea) 88	(Spain) 92	(United States) 96	(Australia) 00	(Greece) 04	(China) 08	(United Kingdom) 12	(Brazil) 16	(Japan) 20	(France) 24	(United States) 28	Years
Algeria	Part of France												–	–	–		8	–	–	–	–	–	–	–	–	14	–	–		2
Egypt				–	8	8	4	=9	=11	=9	w/o	12	4	–	–	–	w/o	8	–	12	–	–	–	–	8	–	8	4		13
Iraq									–			–	–	–			5	14	9	–	–	–	4	–	–	12	–	10		6
Kuwait														–	–	–	6	–	–	16	–	12	–	–	–	IOA	–	–		3
Morocco				Protectorate of France/Spain								–	13	w/o	8	–		12	–	15	–	16	=10	–	11	–	–	3		8
Qatar																		15	–	8	–	–	–	–	–	–	–	–		2
Saudi Arabia															–	–	w/o	16	–	–	15	–	–	–	–	–	15	–		3
Sudan	Part of the United Kingdom											–		–	15			–	–	–	–	–	–	–	–	–	–	–		1
Syria									–			UAR		–	–		14	–	–	–	–	–	–	–	–	–	–	–		1
Tunisia	Protectorate of France											15	–	–	–	–		–	13	–	14	–	12	–	–	–	–	–		4
United Arab Emirates																		–	–	–	–	–	–	–	15	–	–	–		1
Total nations	0	0	0	0	1	1	1	1	1	1	0	2	2	0	2	0	4	5	2	4	2	2	3	0	3	2	2	3		44

=== FIFA Arab Cup ===
Team	1963 (Lebanon) (5)	1964 (Kuwait) (5)	1966 (Iraq) (10)	1985 (Saudi Arabia) (6)	1988 (Jordan) (10)	1992 (Syria) (6)	1998 (Qatar) (12)	2002 (Kuwait) (10)	2012 (Saudi Arabia) (11)	2021 (Qatar) (16)	2025 (Qatar) (16)	2029 (Qatar) (16)	Total
Algeria	×	×	×	×	GS	×	GS	×	×	1st	QF		4
Bahrain	×	×	GS	2nd	GS	×	×	2nd	GS	GS	GS		7
Comoros	×	×	x	x	x	×	×	x	x	•	GS		1
Djibouti	×	×	x	x	x	×	×	x	x	•	•		0
Egypt	×	×	×	×	3rd	1st	GS	×	GS	4th	GS		6
Iraq	×	1st	1st	1st	1st	×	×	×	3rd	GS	QF		7
Jordan	GS	GS	GS	GS	4th	GS	GS	SF	×	QF	2nd		10
Kuwait	4th	3rd	GS	×	GS	3rd	3rd	GS	GS	•	GS		9
Lebanon	3rd	4th	4th	×	GS	×	GS	GS	GS	GS	•		8
Libya	×	2nd	3rd	×	×	×	GS	×	2nd	•	•		4
Mauritania	×	×	×	GS	•	×	×	×	×	GS	•		2
Morocco	×	×	×	×	×	×	GS	SF	1st	QF	1st		5
Oman	×	×	GS	×	×	×	×	×	×	QF	GS		3
Palestine	×	×	GS	×	×	GS	•	GS	GS	GS	QF		6
Qatar	×	×	×	4th	×	×	2nd	×	×	3rd	GS	Q	5
Saudi Arabia	×	×	×	3rd	GS	2nd	1st	1st	4th	GS	3rd		8
Somalia	×	×	x	x	x	×	×	x	x	•	•		0
Sudan	×	×	×	•	×	×	GS	GS	GS	GS	GS		5
Syria	2nd	×	2nd	×	2nd	4th	GS	GS	×	GS	QF		8
Tunisia	1st	×	×	×	GS	×	×	×	×	2nd	GS		4
United Arab Emirates	×	×	×	×	×	×	4th	×	×	QF	3rd		3
Yemen	×	×	GS	×	×	×	×	GS	GS	•	•		3

Note: in the 2025 tournament, the third place match was abandoned. FIFA later declared that both participating teams would share third place in the tournament.

=== Arab Games ===
Team	(Egypt) 1953	(Lebanon) 1957	(Morocco) 1961	(United Arab Republic) 1965	(Syria) 1976	(Morocco) 1985	(Syria) 1992	(Lebanon) 1997	(Jordan) 1999	(Egypt) 2007	(Qatar) 2011	(Algeria) 2023	(Saudi Arabia) 2027	Years
Algeria						3rd						4th		2
Bahrain									GS		1st			2
Egypt	1st		2nd	1st			1st			1st				5
Iraq		GS		GS		1st			2nd		GS			5
Jordan	4th	GS			GS		GS	1st	1st		2nd			7
Kuwait			GS				3rd	4th			3rd			4
Lebanon	GS	3rd	4th	GS				3rd	GS			GS		7
Libya	3rd	GS	3rd	3rd		GS		GS	SF	2nd	GS			9
Mauritania					GS	GS		GS				GS		4
Morocco		4th	1st		1st	2nd								4
Oman				GS				GS	GS		GS	GS		5
Palestine	GS			4th	GS		GS		SF		4th	GS		7
Qatar									GS		GS			2
Saudi Arabia		GS	GS		2nd	4th	2nd		GS	3rd	GS	1st	Q	9
Somalia						GS								1
Sudan				2nd						GS	GS	3rd		4
Syria	2nd	1st		GS	3rd	GS	4th	2nd	GS			2nd		9
Tunisia		2nd				GS								2
United Arab Emirates						GS		GS	GS	4th				4
Yemen				GS	4th	GS								3
Total	6	8	6	9	7	11	6	8	11	5	10	8		

=== Defunct competitions ===
==== FIFA Confederations Cup ====
Team	(Saudi Arabia) 1992 (4)	(Saudi Arabia) 1995 (6)	(Saudi Arabia) 1997 (8)	(Mexico) 1999 (8)	(South Korea) (Japan) 2001 (8)	(France) 2003 (8)	(Germany) 2005 (8)	(South Africa) 2009 (8)	(Brazil) 2013 (8)	(Russia) 2017 (8)	Years
Egypt	•	•	•	GS	•	•	•	GS	•	•	2
Iraq	•	•	•	•	•	•	•	GS	•	•	1
Saudi Arabia	2nd	GS	GS	4th	•	•	•	•	•	•	4
Tunisia	•	•	•	•	•	•	GS	•	•	•	1
United Arab Emirates	•	•	GS	•	•	•	•	•	•	•	1
Total	1	1	2	2	0	0	1	2	0	0	10

== See also ==
- FIFA
  - Asian Football Confederation (AFC)
  - Confederation of African Football (CAF)
