= 2028 CAF Women's Olympic qualifying tournament =

African women's Olympic football qualification tournament

Women's Preliminary Competition Olympic Football Tournaments – Los Angeles 2028 African Qualifiers
Tournament details
- Dates: First round: 4–9 June 2026; Second round: 5–13 October 2026; Third round: 23 February – 6 March 2027; Fourth round: 4–12 October 2027; Fifth round: 23 November – 4 December 2027
- Teams: 35 (from 1 confederation)

The 2028 CAF Women's Olympic Qualifying Tournament is the seventh edition of the CAF Women's Olympic qualifying tournament, the quadrennial international football competition organised by the Confederation of African Football (CAF) to determine which women's national teams from Africa qualify for the 2028 Olympics.

== Format ==
The competition will be contested over five knockout rounds, with each tie played on a home-and-away basis:

- First round: The six lowest-ranked teams according to the FIFA World Rankings were drawn into three ties. The winners advanced to the second round, where they will face the three highest-ranked teams in pre-determined matchups based on the first round draw.
- Second round: The remaining 26 teams were drawn into 13 ties, for a total of 16 matchups. The winners will advance to the third round.
- Third–fifth rounds: The final three rounds will consist of two brackets, with the second round winners placed in specific matchups based upon the second round draw. The two fifth round winners will qualify for the qualify for the 2028 Olympics.

== Entrants ==
Of the 54 CAF member associations, a total of 35 members registered their national teams for the qualifying competition.

- Algeria (73)
- Angola (155)
- Benin (138)
- Botswana (147)
- Burkina Faso (118)
- Cameroon (70)
- Central African Republic (144)
- Comoros (189)
- Congo (114)
- DR Congo (105)
- Djibouti (196)
- Equatorial Guinea (90)
- Ethiopia (137)
- Ghana (59)
- Guinea (142)
- Ivory Coast (72)
- Kenya (128)
- Madagascar (191)
- Malawi (153)
- Mali (85)
- Mauritius (197)
- Morocco (62)
- Namibia (124)
- Nigeria (36)
- Rwanda (169)
- Senegal (80)
- Seychelles (175)
- South Africa (58)
- South Sudan (194)
- Sudan (NR)
- Tanzania (121)
- Tunisia (100)
- Uganda (145)
- Zambia (64)
- Zimbabwe (127)

The remaining 19 members did not register their national teams for the qualifying competition.

- Burundi (180)
- Cape Verde (119)
- Chad (156)
- Egypt (99)
- Eritrea (NR)
- Eswatini (184)
- Gabon (148)
- Gambia (135)
- Guinea-Bissau (178)
- Lesotho (177)
- Liberia (171)
- Libya (187)
- Mauritania (NR)
- Mozambique (173)
- Niger (174)
- São Tomé and Príncipe (NR)
- Sierra Leone (151)
- Somalia (NR)
- Togo (134)

== Draw ==
The qualifying tournament draw was held at 15:00 CAT (UTC+2) on 29 April 2026 at the CAF's headquarters in Cairo. The draw was conducted by players from the Egyptian Women's Premier League: Tanzanian Hasnath Ubamba of Masar, American Mia Darden, and Cameroonian Brenda Tabe of Al Ahly.

The teams were seeded based on the FIFA Women's World Ranking of 21 April 2026 and then divided into pots by zone, with UNAF, UNIFFAC, and WAFU allocated to Pots 1 and 2, and CECAFA and COSAFA to Pots 3 and 4. Teams from Pot 1 were drawn against those from Pot 2, while teams from Pot 3 were drawn against those from Pot 4.

The six lowest-ranked teams – Comoros (189), Madagascar (191), South Sudan (194), Djibouti (196), Mauritius (197), and Sudan (not ranked) – were drawn into the first round, while the three highest-ranked teams – Nigeria (36), South Africa (58), and Ghana (59) – were automatically seeded to face the winners of those ties in the second round.

Draw pots (Note: Number in parentheses indicates FIFA ranking as of the draw)
Pot 1 (Note: Pot consisted of the lowest-ranked sides from UNAF, UNIFFAC and WAFU)	Pot 2 (Note: Pot consisted of the highest-ranked sides from UNAF, UNIFFAC and WAFU)	Pot 3 (Note: Pot consisted of the lowest-ranked sides from CECAFA and COSAFA)	Pot 4 (Note: Pot consisted of the highest-ranked sides from CECAFA and COSAFA)
Tunisia (100); DR Congo (105); Congo (114); Burkina Faso (118); Benin (138); Guinea (142); Central African Republic (144)	Morocco (62); Cameroon (70); Ivory Coast (72); Algeria (73); Senegal (80); Mali (85); Equatorial Guinea (90)	Uganda (145); Botswana (147); Malawi (153); Angola (155); Rwanda (169); Seychelles (175)	Zambia (64); Tanzania (121); Namibia (124); Zimbabwe (127); Kenya (128); Ethiopia (137)

The draw commenced with a team drawn from Pot 1 and paired against a team drawn from Pot 2. The procedure was repeated until all teams had been drawn from Pots 1 and 2, then was applied to Pots 3 and 4.

== Brackets ==
First round
Sudan	0	0	0
Comoros	17	13	30

Second round
Tunisia	0	0	0
Senegal	1	2	3
Benin	3	2	5
Mali	1	6	7
Congo
Morocco	w/o
Comoros	0	0	0
Nigeria	2	5	7
Guinea
Cameroon	w/o
DR Congo	1	0	1
Ivory Coast	4	3	7
Central African Republic	0	0	0
Algeria	8	7	15
Burkina Faso	3	1	4
Equatorial Guinea	1	1	2

Third round
23 Feb – 6 Mar 2027
Senegal
Mali
23 Feb – 6 Mar 2027
Morocco
Nigeria
23 Feb – 6 Mar 2027
Cameroon
Ivory Coast
23 Feb – 6 Mar 2027
Algeria
Burkina Faso

Fourth round
4–12 Oct 2027
Winner Tie 39/40
Winner Tie 41/42
4–12 Oct 2027
Winner Tie 43/44
Winner Tie 45/46

Fifth round
23 Nov – 4 Dec 2027
Winner Tie 55/56
Winner Tie 57/58

First round
South Sudan	1	0	1
Madagascar	1	1	2
Mauritius	2	1	3
Djibouti	1	0	1

Second round
Rwanda	0	1	1
Ethiopia	1	1	2
Botswana	0	0	0
Tanzania	1	6	7
Angola	0	2	2
Namibia	0	0	0
Madagascar	0	0	0
South Africa	4	3	7
Seychelles	0	0	0
Kenya	11	11	22
Malawi	2	7	9
Zimbabwe	0	0	0
Uganda	2	1	3
Zambia	1	4	5
Mauritius	0	0	0
Ghana	3	7	10

Third round
23 Feb – 6 Mar 2027
Ethiopia
Tanzania
23 Feb – 6 Mar 2027
Angola
South Africa
23 Feb – 6 Mar 2027
Kenya
Malawi
23 Feb – 6 Mar 2027
Zambia
Ghana

Fourth round
4–12 Oct 2027
Winner Tie 47/48
Winner Tie 49/50
4–12 Oct 2027
Winner Tie 51/52
Winner Tie 53/54

Fifth round
23 Nov – 4 Dec 2027
Winner Tie 59/60
Winner Tie 61/62

== First round ==
Team 1	Agg.	Team 2	1st leg	2nd leg
Sudan	0–30	Comoros	0–17	0–13
South Sudan	1–2	Madagascar	1–1	0–1
Mauritius	3–1	Djibouti	2–1	1–0

4 June 2026
19:00 UTC+1

Sudan	0–17	Comoros
	Report	Saïd Madjiri 8'; Al. Saïd 17', 42'; Boina Ali 31', 39', 54'; H. Ahamada 33', 49', 66', 89'; Dahmani 37'; Housseni 46'; Maoulida 52'; Anduma 56'; Houmadi 59', 87'; D. Saïd 69'

Larbi Zaouli Stadium, Casablanca (Morocco)
Referee: Suzana Semere Yohannes (Eritrea)
8 June 2026
18:00 UTC+1

Comoros	13–0	Sudan
Houmadi 12', 26', 67', 71'; Hadhirami Ali 40'; Maoulida 48', 62'; Haoudadji 53'; D. Saïd 57'; Ali 75'; H. Ahamada 85', 90+6'; Hassani 90+4'	Report

Larbi Zaouli Stadium, Casablanca (Morocco)
Referee: Seonyatseng Tshephe (Botswana)

Comoros won 30–0 on aggregate.

6 June 2026
15:00 UTC+2

South Sudan	1–1	Madagascar
Albert 56'	Report	Razananivo 18'

Juba Stadium, Juba
Referee: Josephine Nantongo (Uganda)
9 June 2026
15:00 UTC+2

Madagascar	1–0	South Sudan
Razanarisoa 90+3'	Report

Juba Stadium, Juba (South Sudan)
Referee: Vistoria Shangula (Namibia)

Madagascar won 2–1 on aggregate.

4 June 2026
19:00 UTC+4

Mauritius	2–1	Djibouti
Clair 1'; Gopal 90+6' (pen.)	Report	Geremew 38'

Côte d'Or National Sports Complex, Saint Pierre
Referee: Nonjabulo Nonhle Ndlela (South Africa)
8 June 2026
17:30 UTC+4

Djibouti	0–1	Mauritius
	Report	Fourneau 75'

Côte d'Or National Sports Complex, Saint Pierre (Mauritius)

Mauritius won 3–1 on aggregate.

== Second round ==
Team 1	Agg.	Team 2	1st leg	2nd leg
Tunisia	0–3	Senegal	0–1	0–2
Benin	5–7	Mali	3–1	2–6
Congo	w/o	Morocco	—	—
Comoros	0–7	Nigeria	0–2	0–5
Guinea	w/o	Cameroon	—	—
DR Congo	1–7	Ivory Coast	1–4	0–3
Central African Republic	0–15	Algeria	0–8	0–7
Burkina Faso	4–2	Equatorial Guinea	3–1	1–1
Rwanda	1–2	Ethiopia	0–1	1–1
Botswana	0–7	Tanzania	0–1	0–6
Angola	2–0	Namibia	0–0	2–0
Madagascar	0–7	South Africa	0–4	0–3
Seychelles	0–22	Kenya	0–11	0–11
Malawi	9–0	Zimbabwe	2–0	7–0
Uganda	3–5	Zambia	2–1	1–4
Mauritius	0–10	Ghana	0–3	0–7

8 October 2026
19:00 UTC+1

Tunisia	0–1	Senegal
	Report	Casset 63'

Hammadi Agrebi Stadium, Radès
Referee: Chancelle Ngakosso (Congo)
13 October 2026
17:00 UTC+0

Senegal	2–0	Tunisia
N. Ndiaye 13', 27'	Report

Leopold Sédar Senghor Stadium, Dakar

Senegal won 3–0 on aggregate.

8 October 2026
16:00 UTC+0

Benin	3–1	Mali
Gandonou 12', 16'; Sadikou 47'	Report	A. Traoré 54'

Stade de Kégué, Lomé (Togo)
Referee: Grace Gimo (Zimbabwe)
13 October 2026
17:00 UTC+0

Mali	6–2	Benin
F. Diarra 25'; S. Traoré 45+5'; A. Diarra 52', 86' (pen.); A. Traoré 79'; Koné 81'	Report	Gandonou 67', 75'

26 March Stadium, Bamako

Mali won 7–5 on aggregate.

9 October 2026
15:00 UTC+1

Congo	Cancelled	Morocco

Alphonse Massemba-Débat Stadium, Brazzaville
13 October 2026
20:00 UTC+1

Morocco	Cancelled	Congo

Undisclosed, Rabat

Morocco won on walkover after Congo withdrew.

9 October 2026
18:00 UTC+1

Comoros	0–2	Nigeria
	Report	Alozie 47'; Kanu 59'

Remo Stars Stadium, Ikenne (Nigeria)
Referee: Henriette Byukusenge (Rwanda)
13 October 2026
16:00 UTC+1

Nigeria	5–0	Comoros
Payne 41', 63'; Kanu 58', 67'; Ucheibe 71'	Report

Remo Stars Stadium, Ikenne

Nigeria won 7–0 on aggregate.

October 2026

Guinea	Cancelled	Cameroon

October 2026

Cameroon	Cancelled	Guinea

Cameroon won on walkover after Guinea withdrew.

9 October 2026
14:30 UTC+1

DR Congo	1–4	Ivory Coast
Soulac 16'	Report	Sery 3' (pen.), 20'; Gnaly 49'; K. Fofana 53'

TP Mazembe Stadium, Lubumbashi
Referee: Diana Murungi (Uganda)
13 October 2026
19:00 UTC+0

Ivory Coast	3–0	DR Congo
N. Ouédraogo 18'; Meite 24'; Sery 90+3'	Report

Félix-Houphouët-Boigny Stadium, Abidjan

Ivory Coast won 7–1 on aggregate.

9 October 2026
18:00 UTC+1

Central African Republic	0–8	Algeria
	Report	Ndoumba 20' (o.g.); Dafeur 26'; Boussaha 29'; Bekhaled 36'; Naili 51'; Belloumou 67'; Bendris 80'; Bahlouli 90'

5 July 1962 Stadium, Algiers (Algeria)
Referee: Seonyatseng Tshephe (Botswana)
13 October 2026
18:00 UTC+1

Algeria	7–0	Central African Republic
Bendris 2', 52'; Bethi 4', 44'; Dafeur 39' (pen.); Bekhaled 60' (pen.); Smaali 64'	Report

Hocine Aït Ahmed Stadium, Tizi Ouzou
Referee: Aida Sy (Senegal)

Algeria won 15–0 on aggregate.

8 October 2026
18:00 UTC+0

Burkina Faso	3–1	Equatorial Guinea
Konaté 7'; Ouoba 21', 72'	Report	Mendoua 64'

4 August Stadium, Ouagadougou
13 October 2026
14:00 UTC+1

Equatorial Guinea	1–1	Burkina Faso
Meriva 12'	Report	Sam 6'

Ahmadou Ahidjo Stadium, Yaoundé (Cameroon)

Burkina Faso won 4–2 on aggregate.

7 October 2026
18:00 UTC+2

Rwanda	0–1	Ethiopia
	Report	Uzayisenga 45+3' (o.g.)

Kigali Pelé Stadium, Kigali
Referee: Anaëlle Omanda (Gabon)
13 October 2026
16:00 UTC+3

Ethiopia	1–1	Rwanda
Temesgen 29'	Report	Ishimwe 89'

Dire Dawa Stadium, Dire Dawa
Referee: Dominique Hanjavola (Madagascar)

Ethiopia won 2–1 on aggregate.

9 October 2026
19:00 UTC+2

Botswana	0–1	Tanzania
	Report	Clement 64'

National Stadium, Gaborone
Referee: Yemisi Akintoye (Nigeria)
13 October 2026
16:00 UTC+3

Tanzania	6–0	Botswana
Mnunka 39'; Ubamba 44'; Maseke 60'; Clement 69'; Siyame 74'; Lunyamila 90'	Report

Azam Complex Stadium, Chamazi
Referee: Rachel Zihindula (DR Congo)

Tanzania won 7–0 on aggregate.

9 October 2026
16:00 UTC+1

Angola	0–0	Namibia
	Report

11 November Stadium, Talatona
Referee: Leticia Kenga (Central African Republic)
12 October 2026
16:00 UTC+2

Namibia	0–2	Angola
	Report	Luís 35'; Da Silva 65' (pen.)

11 November Stadium, Talatona (Angola)
Referee: Emmanuela Akoo (South Sudan)

Angola won 2–0 on aggregate.

9 October 2026
15:00 UTC+2

Madagascar	0–4	South Africa
	Report	Donnelly 26', 37', 61'; Solange 78' (o.g.)

Free State Stadium, Bloemfontein (South Africa)
Attendance: 0 (Behind closed doors)
13 October 2026
18:00 UTC+2

South Africa	3–0	Madagascar
Salgado 46'; Donnelly 64', 76'	Report

Free State Stadium, Bloemfontein
Referee: Innocentia Ntangti (Cameroon)

South Africa won 7–0 on aggregate.

8 October 2026
15:00 UTC+3

Seychelles	0–11	Kenya
	Report	Nekesa 8', 43'; Muteshi 25', 54'; Madalina 61', 82'; Amunyolete 83'; Airo 86', 90+1'; Mideva 87', 90+3'

Nyayo National Stadium, Nairobi (Kenya)
Referee: Cacilda Fernando (Mozambique)
12 October 2026
15:00 UTC+3

Kenya	11–0	Seychelles
Makungu 6'; Nanjala 22'; Shikangwa 17', 20', 65'; Nasaka 31'; Adam 48', 78'; Adhiambo 85'; Serenge 87', 90+2'	Report

Nyayo National Stadium, Nairobi
Referee: Dorsaf Ganouati (Tunisia)

Kenya won 22–0 on aggregate.

9 October 2026
15:00 UTC+2

Malawi	2–0	Zimbabwe
Te. Chawinga 33'; Ta. Chawinga 50'	Report

Bingu National Stadium, Lilongwe
Referee: Love Wehyee (Liberia)
13 October 2026
15:00 UTC+2

Zimbabwe	0–7	Malawi
	Report	Te. Chawinga 7', 29', 56'; Ta. Chawinga 52'; Banda 86'; Simwaka 88'; Mulimbika 90'

National Sports Stadium, Harare
Referee: Rahma Youssef (Egypt)

Malawi won 9–0 on aggregate.

8 October 2026
16:00 UTC+3

Uganda	2–1	Zambia
Nabukenya 34'; Kabene 58'	Report	Chilufya 6'

Hamz Stadium, Kampala
Referee: Zakia El Grini (Morocco)
13 October 2026
18:00 UTC+2

Zambia	4–1	Uganda
Nanyangwe 8'; Phiri 21'; B. Banda 51', 85'	Report	Kabene 15'

Levy Mwanawasa Stadium, Ndola

Zambia won 5–3 on aggregate.

8 October 2026
18:30 UTC+4

Mauritius	0–3	Ghana
	Report	Kim 16'; Kusi 24'; Simon 45+3'

Côte d'Or National Sports Complex, Saint Pierre
Referee: Sisay Raya (Ethiopia)
13 October 2026
16:00 UTC+0

Ghana	7–0	Mauritius
Badu 9'; Boakye 27'; Zakaria 32'; Abdulai 74', 90+3'; Cudjoe 87' (pen.); Amoh 89'	Report

Accra Sports Stadium, Accra
Referee: Joselyne Nsabimana (Burundi)

Ghana won 10–0 on aggregate.

== Third round ==
Team 1	Agg.	Team 2	1st leg	2nd leg
Senegal	Matches 39/40	Mali	23 Feb – 6 Mar	23 Feb – 6 Mar
Morocco	Matches 41/42	Nigeria	23 Feb – 6 Mar	23 Feb – 6 Mar
Cameroon	Matches 43/44	Ivory Coast	23 Feb – 6 Mar	23 Feb – 6 Mar
Algeria	Matches 45/46	Burkina Faso	23 Feb – 6 Mar	23 Feb – 6 Mar
Ethiopia	Matches 47/48	Tanzania	23 Feb – 6 Mar	23 Feb – 6 Mar
Angola	Matches 49/50	South Africa	23 Feb – 6 Mar	23 Feb – 6 Mar
Kenya	Matches 51/52	Malawi	23 Feb – 6 Mar	23 Feb – 6 Mar
Zambia	Matches 53/54	Ghana	23 Feb – 6 Mar	23 Feb – 6 Mar

February 2027

Senegal	v	Mali

March 2027

Mali	v	Senegal

February 2027

Morocco	v	Nigeria

March 2027

Nigeria	v	Morocco

February 2027

Cameroon	v	Ivory Coast

March 2027

Ivory Coast	v	Cameroon

February 2027

Algeria	v	Burkina Faso

March 2027

Burkina Faso	v	Algeria

February 2027

Ethiopia	v	Tanzania

March 2027

Tanzania	v	Ethiopia

February 2027

Angola	v	South Africa

March 2027

South Africa	v	Angola

February 2027

Kenya	v	Malawi

March 2027

Malawi	v	Kenya

February 2027

Zambia	v	Ghana

March 2027

Ghana	v	Zambia

== Fourth round ==
Team 1	Agg.	Team 2	1st leg	2nd leg
Winner Matches 39/40 (N/A)	Matches 55/56	(N/A) Winner Matches 41/42	4–12 Oct '27	4–12 Oct '27
Winner Matches 43/44 (N/A)	Matches 57/58	(N/A) Winner Matches 45/46	4–12 Oct '27	4–12 Oct '27
Winner Matches 47/48 (N/A)	Matches 59/60	(N/A) Winner Matches 49/50	4–12 Oct '27	4–12 Oct '27
Winner Matches 51/52 (N/A)	Matches 61/62	(N/A) Winner Matches 53/54	4–12 Oct '27	4–12 Oct '27

== Fifth round ==
Team 1	Agg.	Team 2	1st leg	2nd leg
Winner Matches 55/56 (N/A)	Matches 63/64	(N/A) Winner Matches 57/58	23 Nov – 4 Dec '27	23 Nov – 4 Dec '27
Winner Matches 59/60 (N/A)	Matches 65/66	(N/A) Winner Matches 61/62	23 Nov – 4 Dec '27	23 Nov – 4 Dec '27

== Qualified teams for the 2028 Summer Olympics ==
The following two teams from CAF qualified for the 2028 Summer Olympic women's tournament in the United States.

Team	Qualified on	Previous appearances in Summer Olympics
	November/December 2027	
	November/December 2027	
