= 2026 Arab Beach Soccer Championship =

Tournament details
- Host country: Egypt
- City: Port Said
- Dates: 5–9 November
- Teams: 8 (from 2 confederations)
- Venue: 1 (in 1 host city)

Final positions
- Champions: Morocco (1st title)
- Runners-up: Mauritania

Tournament statistics
- Matches played: 15
- Goals scored: 117 (7.8 per match)
- Top scorer(s): (Lebanon) Mohammad Al Saleh (8 goals)
- Best player: (Mauritania) Cheikh Belkheir
- Best goalkeeper: (Morocco) M'hamed Manar

The 2026 Arab Beach Soccer Championship (Arabic: بطولة العرب لكرة القدم الشاطئية 2026), known as the Capital Cup (Arabic: كأس العاصمة) is the 5th edition of the Arab Beach Soccer Championship, an international beach soccer championship contested by senior men's national teams of the member associations of UAFA. It will be held in Port Said, Egypt, from November 5 to 9, 2026. This will be Egypt's third time hosting the competition, following the 2008 and 2014 editions.

Egypt are the two-time defending champions, having claimed the title in the last two editions.

== Participation ==
A total of 8 of the 22 UAFA member associations entered teams for the competition. Seven of the eight teams also took part in the previous edition, with Iraq making its debut in the tournament. This will be the first edition in which the United Arab Emirates will not participate.

Confederation	Team	App.	Previous best performance	WR
CAF (Africa) (4 teams)	Egypt	5th	Champions (2014, 2023)	27
CAF (Africa) (4 teams)	Libya	4th	Champions (2008)	76
CAF (Africa) (4 teams)	Mauritania	2nd	Quarter-finals (2023)	24
CAF (Africa) (4 teams)	Morocco	4th	Semi-finals (2023)	20
AFC (Asia) (4 teams)	Iraq	1st	Debut	75
AFC (Asia) (4 teams)	Lebanon	3rd	Runners-up (2014)	52
AFC (Asia) (4 teams)	Oman	5th	Runners-up (2023)	10
AFC (Asia) (4 teams)	Saudi Arabia	4th	Champions (2010)	17

== Group stage ==
All times are local, CAT (UTC+2).

=== Group A ===
Pos	Team	Pld	W	W+	WP	L	GF	GA	GD	Pts	Qualification
1	Mauritania	3	2	0	0	1	14	5	+9	6	Knockout stage
2	Egypt (H)	3	2	0	0	1	11	8	+3	6	Knockout stage
3	Saudi Arabia	3	1	0	0	2	7	9	−2	3	
4	Iraq	3	0	0	1	2	5	15	−10	1	

Source: UAFA
Rules for classification: Tiebreakers
(H) Host
5 November 2026
11:00

Mauritania	8–1	Iraq
	Report

Port Said Beach Stadium
5 November 2026
14:45

Egypt	5–2	Saudi Arabia
Haitham Atef; Abdulrahman Toto; Ismaeel Bahgat; Mohamed Abdelnaby; Hassane Mohamed	Report; Report (EFA)

Port Said Beach Stadium

6 November 2026
13:00

Saudi Arabia	3–2	Mauritania
Omar Yahya; Ramzi Dakman; Ahmed Al-Hamami	Report

Port Said Beach Stadium
6 November 2026
15:30

Iraq	2–5	Egypt
	Report; Report (EFA)	Hassane Mohamed ×2; Hossam Paulo; Abdulrahman Toto; Karim Shehata

Port Said Beach Stadium

7 November 2026
11:00

Iraq	2–2 (a.e.t.)	Saudi Arabia
	Report	Ahmed Al-Hamami ×2
Penalties
	6–5

Port Said Beach Stadium
7 November 2026
14:45

Egypt	1–4	Mauritania
	Report

Port Said Beach Stadium

=== Group B ===
Pos	Team	Pld	W	W+	WP	L	GF	GA	GD	Pts	Qualification
1	Morocco	3	2	0	1	0	19	10	+9	7	Knockout stage
2	Lebanon	3	0	1	1	1	16	17	−1	3	Knockout stage
3	Oman	3	1	0	0	2	13	12	+1	3	
4	Libya	3	0	0	0	3	8	17	−9	0	

Source: UAFA
Rules for classification: Tiebreakers
5 November 2026
12:15

Oman	3–2	Libya
Abdullah Al-Sauti; Yahya Al-Muraiki; Fahad Al-Mesheikhi	Report	Suleiman Bourahim; Waleed Al-Awjili

Port Said Beach Stadium
5 November 2026
13:30

Morocco	7–4	Lebanon
Adnan Oubahri ×2; M'hamed Manar; Driss Ghannam; Zouhair Jabbary; Imad Laadimi	Report; Report (FRMF)	Ahmad Hamed; Mohammad Haidar; Mohammad Al Saleh; Mohamad Ossman

Port Said Beach Stadium

6 November 2026
09:30

Libya	1–7	Morocco
	Report	Amine El Bidouri; Reda Zahraoui; Driss Ghannam; Badr El Kraichly; Yassir Abada; Mohammed El Hichou; Zouhair Jabbary

Port Said Beach Stadium
6 November 2026
14:15

Lebanon	5–5 (a.e.t.)	Oman
Ahmad Hamed ×2; Mohammad Al Saleh ×3	Report
Penalties
	3–2

Port Said Beach Stadium

7 November 2026
12:15

Lebanon	7–5 (a.e.t.)	Libya
Mohamad Ossman; Hussein Abdallah; Sameh Jalal; Mohammad Al Saleh ×3; Ahmad Hamed	Report

Port Said Beach Stadium
7 November 2026
13:30

Oman	5–5 (a.e.t.)	Morocco
	Report	Badr El Kraichly ×2; M'hamed Manar; Adnan Oubahri; Driss Ghannam
Penalties
	2–4

Port Said Beach Stadium

== Knockout stage ==
=== Bracket ===
Semi-finals
8 November
Mauritania	5
Lebanon	3
8 November
Morocco	3
Egypt	2

Final
9 November
Mauritania	5
Morocco	6

=== Semi-finals ===
8 November 2026
12:00

Mauritania	5–3	Lebanon
		Mohammad Al Saleh; Ali Al Saleh; Ali Hallal

Port Said Beach Stadium

8 November 2026
13:30

Morocco	3–2	Egypt
Zouhair Jabbary 2'; Amine El Bidouri 24'; Driss Ghannam 34'	Report (EFA)	Hassane Mohamed 10'; Karim Shehata 27'

Port Said Beach Stadium

=== Final ===
9 November 2026
13:00

Mauritania	5–6	Morocco
Mohamedou Wedou 4', 17'; Cheikh Belkheir 8', 36'; Mahmoud Seyedi 18'	Report	Reda Zahraoui 12'; Zouhair Jabbary 19'; Driss Ghannam 24', 36'; Amine El Bidouri 28'; Badr El Kraichly 34'

Port Said Beach Stadium
