= Zaharouna Haoudadji =

Comorian footballer (born 2000

Personal information
- Date of birth: June 3, 2000 (age 26)
- Place of birth: Mamoudzou, Mayotte
- Height: 1.70 m (5 ft 7 in)
- Position: Forward

Team information
- Current team: Quevilly-Rouen

Senior career*
Years	Team	Apps	(Gls)
2023–2024	Le Puy	13	(6)
2024–	Quevilly-Rouen	4	(2)

International career
- Comoros
- * Club domestic league appearances and goals

Zaharouna Haoudadji (born 3 June 2000) is a Comorian footballer who plays as a striker for Le Puy Foot 43 Auvergne.

== Early life ==
Haoudadji was born in Mayotte and moved to Metropolitan France at the age of one.

== Career ==
In 2021, Haoudadji signed for Swedish side Stallarholmens SK, where she was regarded as one of the club's most important players.

== Style of play ==
Haoudadji mainly operates as a striker but has played as a defensive midfielder for the Comoros women's national football team.

== International goals ==
No.	Date	Venue	Opponent	Score	Result	Competition
1.	8 June 2026	Larbi Zaouli Stadium, Casablanca, Morocco	Sudan	5–0	13–0	2028 CAF Women's Olympic Qualifying Tournament

== Personal life ==
Haoudadji is a native of Mamoudzou, France.
