= 2027 Arab Women's Cup =

كأس العرب للسيدات 2027

Tournament details
- Host country: Morocco
- Dates: 2–18 September

The 2027 Arab Women's Cup (Arabic: كأس العرب للسيدات 2027) will be the third edition of the Arab Women's Cup for national women's football teams affiliated with the Union of Arab Football Associations (UAFA). The tournament will be hosted by Morocco between 2 and 18 September 2027.
