= 2023 Arab Beach Soccer Cup =

Tournament details
- Host country: Saudi Arabia
- City: Jeddah
- Dates: 11–20 May 2023
- Teams: 12 (from 2 confederations)
- Venue: 1 (in 1 host city)

Final positions
- Champions: Egypt (2nd title)
- Runners-up: Oman

Tournament statistics
- Matches played: 26
- Goals scored: 211 (8.12 per match)

The 2023 Arab Beach Soccer Cup is the fourth edition of the Arab Beach Soccer Cup, the premier beach soccer championship in Arab world contested by men's national teams who are members of the Union of Arab Football Associations (UAFA). The tournament was due to take place in Saudi Arabia between 1 and 7 October 2022. But it was rescheduled to take place from 11 to 20 May 2023.

Egypt is the defending champions after defeating Lebanon 6–5 in the final to secure their first title.

== Teams ==
=== Participating nations ===
A total of 12 teams entered the tournament.

Team	App	Last	Best placement in the tournament
Comoros	1st	–	debut
Egypt	4th	2014	Champions (2014)
Kuwait	2nd	2008	Group stage (2008)
Lebanon	2nd	2014	Runners-up (2014)
Libya	3rd	2010	Champions (2008)
Mauritania	1st	–	debut
Morocco	3rd	2014	Group stage (2008, 2014)
Oman	4th	2014	Third place (2014)
Palestine	1st	–	debut
Saudi Arabia	3rd	2014	Champions (2010)
~~Sudan~~ w/o (Note: Sudan's beach soccer team withdrew from the Arab Cup tournament, scheduled for May 11-20, due to the situation in the country.)	2nd	2014	Group stage (2014)
United Arab Emirates	4th	2014	Runners-up (2008, 2010)
Kyrgyzstan (invited)	1st		

Did not enter

- Algeria
- Bahrain
- Djibouti
- Iraq
- Jordan
- Qatar
- Somalia
- Syria
- Tunisia
- Yemen

=== Draw ===
The draw of the tournament was held on 16 April 2023 in Riyadh, Saudi Arabia. The 12 teams were drawn into three groups of four teams. The teams were seeded according to their BSWW World Ranking, with the hosts Saudi Arabia automatically seeded and assigned to Position A1 in the draw.

Pot 1	Pot 2	Pot 3	Pot 4
1. Saudi Arabia (hosts); 2. United Arab Emirates; 3. Oman	4. Morocco; 5. Egypt; 6. Kuwait	7. Palestine; 8. Lebanon; 9. Libya	10. Comoros; 11. Mauritania; 12. Sudan

== Venues ==
Alhamra Beach Stadium, Jeddah

== Group stage ==
=== Group A ===
Pos	Team	Pld	W	W+	WP	L	GF	GA	GD	Pts	Qualification
1	Saudi Arabia (H)	3	2	0	0	1	15	13	+2	6	Knockout stage
2	Morocco	3	1	1	0	1	17	13	+4	5	Knockout stage
3	Mauritania	3	1	0	0	2	12	14	−2	3	Knockout stage
4	Lebanon	3	1	0	0	2	14	18	−4	3	

Source: UAFA
(H) Host
11 May 2023
19:00

Saudi Arabia	7–3	Mauritania
Mudhaya 2'37"; Sarraj 9'25"; Al-Yami 14'13", 14'36", 30'49"; Shamhani 18'35"; Bawdah 21'46"	Report	Sidi 10'16"; Zweide 16'30"; Belkheir 28'45"

Al-Hamra'a Beach Stadium, Jeddah
Referee: Fallah Al Balushi (Oman)
11 May 2023
20:30

Morocco	9–5	Lebanon
Jabbary 11'52"; Bessak 12'13", 23'32", 25'16" (pen.), 28'49", 29'55"; Frindi 23'14", 33'38"; El Kraichly 31'28"	Report	Merhi 3'44", 17'52"; Abdullah 12'35"; El Khatib 16'21"; Haidar 29'15" (pen.)

Al-Hamra'a Beach Stadium, Jeddah
Referee: Abdulaziz Abdullah (Kuwait)

14 May 2023
19:00

Mauritania	4–5 (a.e.t.)	Morocco
Belkheir 3'45", 5'51", 14'58", 26'23"	Report	El Kraichly 5'58"; Frindi 10'54"; Abagli 34'06"; Bessak 34'56"; Ghailani 38'53"

Al-Hamra'a Beach Stadium, Jeddah
Referee: Turki Al Salehi (Oman)
14 May 2023
20:30

Saudi Arabia	4–7	Lebanon
Bawdah 13'19" (pen.), 19'15"; Al-Yami 27'27" (pen.); Sarraj 33'07"	Report	Al Saleh 7'55", 22'24", 28'34", 33'37", 34'46"; Haidar 30'09"; Grada 31'21"

Al-Hamra'a Beach Stadium, Jeddah
Referee: Abdulla Saleh (Bahrain)

16 May 2023
19:00

Morocco	3–4	Saudi Arabia
Zahraoui 8'47"; Frindi 34'13"; Abagli 35'17"	Report	Al-Yami 18'04", 33'01"; Dakman 19'51"; Sarraj 28'14"

Al-Hamra'a Beach Stadium, Jeddah
Referee: Abdulaziz Abdullah (Kuwait)
16 May 2023
20:30

Lebanon	2–5	Mauritania
Hamed 22'42"; Abdullah 24'46"	Report	Belkheir 1'58" (pen.), 26'54", 30'29", 35'12"; Derwich 33'37"

Al-Hamra'a Beach Stadium, Jeddah
Referee: Turki Al Salehi (Oman)

=== Group B ===
Pos	Team	Pld	W	W+	WP	L	GF	GA	GD	Pts	Qualification
1	Egypt	3	3	0	0	0	14	7	+7	9	Knockout stage
2	Oman	3	2	0	0	1	24	6	+18	6	Knockout stage
3	Palestine	3	1	0	0	2	8	11	−3	3	Knockout stage
4	Kyrgyzstan	3	0	0	0	3	3	25	−22	0	

Source: UAFA
13 May 2023
17:30

Oman	7–1	Palestine
Al Bulushi 1'26"; Kh. Al-Oraimi 2'23", 10'13", 28'39"; Al Owaisi 12'29", 23'59"; Al Hindasi 25'33"	Report	Hassan 31'29"

Al-Hamra'a Beach Stadium, Jeddah
Referee: Hassan Abed Rabbo (Lebanon)
13 May 2023
19:00

Kyrgyzstan	2–6	Egypt
Samat Uulu 32'21"; Mukaev 32'55"	Report	Elshafei 10'36", 34'22"; M. Aly 18'54", 19'28"; Hussein 30'04"; H. Aly 30'24"

Al-Hamra'a Beach Stadium, Jeddah
Referee: Mahmoud Abu-Mustafa (Palestine)

15 May 2023
20:30

Palestine	5–1	Kyrgyzstan
Atiya 2'13"; Ibaid 17'56"; Hassan 20'32", 20'51", 25'55"	Report	Usenbaev 21'12"

Al-Hamra'a Beach Stadium, Jeddah
Referee: Hamdi Bchir (Tunisia)
15 May 2023
22:00

Egypt	5–3	Oman
Elshafei 1'24"; Hussein 2'22"; Abdelmoneim 27'58"; Soliman 31'39"; Mahsoub 35'11"	Report	Kh. Al-Oraimi 1'30"; Al Sauti 14'31"; Al Owaisi 20'59"

Al-Hamra'a Beach Stadium, Jeddah
Referee: Abdulaziz Abdullah (Kuwait)

17 May 2023
17:30

Kyrgyzstan	0–14	Oman
	Report	Ma. Al Araimi 1'21", 25'04"; Al Bulushi 2'16", 25'33", 27'24", 35'24" (pen.); Al Battashi 5'04"; Al Hindasi 5'09", 19'28"; Kh. Al-Oraimi 10'13"; Al Sauti 23'24", 28'26", 30'44", 33'23" (pen.)

Al-Hamra'a Beach Stadium, Jeddah
Referee: Samer Karram (Syria)
17 May 2023
19:00

Egypt	3–2	Palestine
Abdelkodos 3'10"; Soliman 16'41"; Hussein 18'26"	Report	Abu-Obayda 2'25", 18'20"

Al-Hamra'a Beach Stadium, Jeddah
Referee: Hassan Abed Rabbo (Lebanon)

=== Group C ===
Pos	Team	Pld	W	W+	WP	L	GF	GA	GD	Pts	Qualification
1	United Arab Emirates	3	3	0	0	0	23	9	+14	9	Knockout stage
2	Libya	3	2	0	0	1	11	12	−1	6	Knockout stage
3	Comoros	3	0	0	1	2	9	18	−9	1	
4	Kuwait	3	0	0	0	3	7	11	−4	0	

Source: UAFA
13 May 2023
20:30

United Arab Emirates	5–2	Libya
Yaqoub 4'01"; A. Beshr 20'29"; W. Beshr 24'49"; Al-Kaabi 33'24"; A. Mohammadi 34'22"		Mohamed 15'44"; Al-Abidi 31'19"

Al-Hamra'a Beach Stadium, Jeddah
Referee: Driss Lamghaidar (Morocco)
13 May 2023
22:00

Kuwait	1–1 (a.e.t.)	Comoros
Al-Manaye 5'50"		Massulaha 15'56"
Penalties
Al-Harban (penalty scored); Al-Kandari (penalty scored); Al-Sedrah (penalty missed); Abbas (penalty missed)	2–4	(penalty scored) Ali; (penalty scored) Soilihi; (penalty scored) Ousseni; (penalty scored) Mansoibou

Al-Hamra'a Beach Stadium, Jeddah
Referee: Turki Al Salehi (Oman)

15 May 2023
17:30

Libya	3–2	Kuwait
Mohamed 2'35"; Rahoumah 8'23"; Al-Taweel 25'39"	Report	Hajeyah 13'16"; Al-Shafei 27'52"

Al-Hamra'a Beach Stadium, Jeddah
Referee: Fallah Al Balushi (Oman)
15 May 2023
19:00

Comoros	3–11	United Arab Emirates
Moeva 17'19"; Soilihi 24'05"; Ismaël 32'21"	Report	Al-Blooshi 7'14", 8'22", 22'51"; A. Mohammadi 9'08", 14'41"; Daryaei 11'23"; Al-Kaabi 14'10"; Malahi 17'17"; A. Beshr 27'31", 33'41"; H. Al-Balooshi 29'34"

Al-Hamra'a Beach Stadium, Jeddah
Referee: Waleed Abdulkarim (Bahrain)

17 May 2023
20:30

Kuwait	4–7	United Arab Emirates
Al-Shafei 1'28"; Hajeyah 12'04", 24'14", 27'36"	Report	K. Al-Balooshi 4'24", 29'26"; Al-Blooshi 6'00"; Dahqani 17'56", 18'43"; A. Beshr 31'46"; Yaqoub 33'59"

Al-Hamra'a Beach Stadium, Jeddah
Referee: Akram Saleh (Iraq)
17 May 2023
22:00

Comoros	5–6	Libya
Ali 6'23"; Ismaël 7'24"; Ousseni 21'39", 29'01"; Moeva 28'09"	Report	Mohamed 2'41"; A. Al-Sharif 7'27"; Al-Rageay 10'12", 15'25", 34'16"; Ismaël 24'05" (o.g.)

Al-Hamra'a Beach Stadium, Jeddah
Referee: Gerges Yarak (Lebanon)

=== Ranking of third-placed teams ===
Pos	Grp	Team	Pld	W	W+	WP	L	GF	GA	GD	Pts	Qualification
1	A	Mauritania	3	1	0	0	2	12	14	−2	3	Knockout stage
2	B	Palestine	3	1	0	0	2	8	11	−3	3	Knockout stage
3	C	Comoros	3	0	0	1	2	9	18	−9	1	

Source: UAFA

== Knockout stage ==
=== Bracket ===
Quarter-finals
18 May
Saudi Arabia	3
Palestine	5
18 May
Egypt	8
Mauritania	3
18 May
Oman (a.e.t.)	5
United Arab Emirates	4
18 May
Libya	2
Morocco	5

Semi-finals
19 May
Palestine	3
Egypt	4
19 May
Oman	4
Morocco	2

Final
20 May
Egypt	4
Oman	2

=== Quarter-finals ===
18 May 2023
17:30

Saudi Arabia	3–5	Palestine
Al-Ajmi 24'45"; Shamhani 34'10"; Tumayhi 35'53"	Report	Dakman 0'38" (o.g.); Al-Nahhal 7'51", 13'43"; Jaber 15'22"; Abu-Obayda 32'02"

Alhamra Beach Stadium, Jeddah
Referee: Fallah Al Balushi (Oman)

18 May 2023
19:00

Egypt	8–3	Mauritania
Aly 2'04"; Shaaban 2'24" (pen.); Elshafei 3'17", 33'14"; Hussein 26'38"; Mahsoub 28'07", 29'45"; Soliman 35'45"	Report	Belkheir 1'30"; Diallo 2'09"; Sy 5'52"

Al-Hamra'a Beach Stadium, Jeddah
Referee: Waleed Abdulkarim (Bahrain)
18 May 2023
20:30

Oman	5–4 (a.e.t.)	United Arab Emirates
Al Muraiki 3'55"; Al Bulushi 19'29"; Kh. Al Oraimi 22'24"; Al Sauti 23'59"; Al Araimi 36'28"	Report	Mohammadi 20'45"; A. Beshr 23'31", 25'36"; Dahqani 27'13"

Al-Hamra'a Beach Stadium, Jeddah
Referee: Hany Farouk (Egypt)

18 May 2023
22:00

Libya	2–5	Morocco
Mohamed 7'18"; Al-Rageay 9'49"	Report	Frindi 11'29", 16'36"; Zahraoui 16'10"; El Kraichly 21'51", 28'03"

Al-Hamra'a Beach Stadium, Jeddah
Referee: Turki Al Salehi (Oman)

=== Semi-finals ===
19 May 2023
19:00

Palestine	3–4	Egypt
Hassan 11'36", 28'52", 35'02"	Report	Aly 9'21", 30'15"; Shaaban 15'21"; Hussein 29'32"

Al-Hamra'a Beach Stadium, Jeddah
Referee: Hassan Abed Rabbo (Lebanon)

19 May 2023
20:30

Oman	4–2	Morocco
Bessak 9'28" (o.g.); Al Bulushi 25'34"; Al Muraiki 28'58"; Al Sauti 29'23"	Report	Bessak 9'55", 19'41"

Al-Hamra'a Beach Stadium, Jeddah
Referee: Abdulla Saleh (Bahrain)

=== Final ===
20 May 2023
21:00

Egypt	4–2	Oman
Hussein 10'38", 14'45"; Abdelkodos 17'18"; Mahsoub 19'11"	Report	Al Muraiki 10'31"; Al-Oraimi 35'46"

Al-Hamra'a Beach Stadium, Jeddah
Referee: Hamdi Bchir (Tunisia)
