= Arab Women's Cup =

Association football competition for women's national teams in the Arab world

- The official logo
- Organiser(s): UAFA
- Founded: 2006; 20 years ago
- Region: Arab world (UAFA)
- Teams: 7
- Current champions: Jordan (1st title)
- Most championships: Algeria; Jordan (1 title each)
- Website: uafaonline.com (defunct)
- 2027 Arab Women's Cup

The Arab Women's Cup (Arabic: كأس العرب للسيدات) is an international football competition between the women's national teams of the members of the Union of Arab Football Associations (UAFA), the governing body for countries in the Arab world. The competition has been held twice, in Alexandria in 2006 and in Cairo in 2021. Seven teams participated in each tournament. Algeria won the 2006 edition, while Jordan won the 2021 edition. The 2027 Arab Women's Cup will be held in Morocco.

== Results ==
Edition	Year	Hosts	Champions	Score and Venue	Runners-up	Third place	Score and Venue	Fourth place	No. of teams
1	2006	Egypt	Algeria	1–0; Alexandria Stadium, Alexandria	Morocco	Tunisia	2–1; Alexandria Stadium, Alexandria	Egypt	7
2	2021	Egypt	Jordan	1–0; Osman Ahmed Osman Stadium, Cairo	Tunisia	Algeria and Egypt (Note: No third place match was played.)			7
3	2027	Morocco	Future event			Future event			TBD

- a.e.t.: after extra time
- p: after penalty shoot-out
- TBD: to be determined

== Teams reaching the top four ==
Teams reaching the top four
Team	Titles	Runners-up	Third place	Fourth place	Total
Algeria	1 (2006)		1 (2021) (Note: There was no third place match in the 2021 Arab Women's Cup.)		2
Jordan	1 (2021)				1
Tunisia		1 (2021)	1 (2006)		2
Morocco		1 (2006)			1
Egypt			1 (2021) (Note: Hosts))	1 (2006)	2

== Overall team records ==
In this ranking 3 points are awarded for a win, 1 for a draw and 0 for a loss. As per statistical convention in football, matches decided in extra time are counted as wins and losses, while matches decided by penalty shoot-outs are counted as draws. Teams are ranked by total points, then by goal difference, then by goals scored.

As of 2021 Arab Women's Cup

Rank	Team	Part	Pld	W	D	L	GF	GA	GD	Pts
1	Algeria	2	7	5	2	0	25	4	+21	17
2	Egypt	2	9	5	1	3	38	12	+26	16
3	Tunisia	2	10	4	3	3	33	12	+21	15
4	Jordan	1	4	3	0	1	11	6	+5	9
5	Morocco	1	4	2	1	1	12	3	+9	7
6	Lebanon	2	5	1	1	3	5	25	-20	4
7	Syria	1	3	1	0	2	2	17	-15	3
8	Sudan	1	3	0	0	3	2	27	-25	0
9	Palestine	2	5	0	0	5	3	23	-20	0

== Comprehensive team results by tournament ==
Legend

- 1st – Champions
- 2nd – Runners-up
- 3rd – Third place
- 4th – Fourth place
- GS – Group stage
- q — Qualified for upcoming tournament
- × — Did not participate
- — Hosts
- — National Team did not exist

Team	(Egypt) 2006	(Egypt) 2021	Years
Algeria	1st	3rd	2
Bahrain		x	0
Comoros		x	0
Djibouti	x	x	0
Egypt	4th	3rd	2
Iraq		x	0
Jordan	×	1st	1
Kuwait		x	0
Lebanon	GS	GS	2
Libya		x	0
Morocco	2nd	×	1
Mauritania		x	0
Palestine	GS	GS	2
Qatar		x	0
Saudi Arabia			0
Sudan		GS	1
Syria	GS	×	1
Somalia			0
Tunisia	3rd	2nd	2
United Arab Emirates		x	0
Yemen			0
Total	7	7	

== See also ==
- FIFA Arab Cup
- Arab U-17 Women's Cup
- 2010 Arabia Women's Cup
