= Abdul Latif Booker =

Libyan football administrator

President of UAFA
- In office 1974–1976
- Succeeded by: Faisal bin Fahd

Personal details
- Born: 12 June 1945 (age 80) Tripoli, Libya
- Occupation: Journalist; Football administrator Diplomat

Abdul Latif Booker (Arabic: عبد اللطيف بوكر; born 12 June 1945 in Tripoli, Libya) was the first president of the Union of Arab Football Associations, he is too, the former president of the Libyan Football Federation.

== Biography ==
Abdul Latif Booker, was born in Tripoli on the 12th June 1945. He holds a high diploma in journalism from Egypt in 1967.

As a journalist, he worked as a sports editor from 1967 to 1972, and headed the sports section of the newspaper Al-Raed, he also worked in the Al-Riyadha Al-Jamahiriya newspaper and served as editor-in-chief of Al-Rai newspaper in Tripoli from 1972 to 1974. He was a founding member of the Arab League for Sports Journalism in 1972 in Baghdad, a member of the Supreme Committee for Sports Planning from 1973 to 1976. He also assumed the presidency of the media sector in Tripoli, founded and headed the local Radio of Tripoli, and served as general secretary in the media sector and director of the media research and documentation office.

As a football administrator, he assumed on first, the presidency of the Al-Wahda Tripoli from 1970 to 1975, he was shosen the director of the 1973 Palestine Cup of Nations. He was named the president of the Libyan Football Federation for three terms, (1973-74, 1986-89 and 1991). He founded and assumed the presidency of the Union of Arab Football Associations (UAFA) from 1974 to 1976, and took the Libyan capital, Tripoli, as its headquarters until 1976. He worked as president of the Sports Media Committee of the UAFA since its founding in 1985, he was a member of it Executive Committee in 1988 and also, he assumed the presidency of the General publishing, Distribution and Advertising Company from 1975 to 1980.

As a diplomat, he was a member of the Al-Fikr Association in 1971. and was named ambassador of the State of Libya to Brazil for four consecutive years, from 1980 to 1984, and head of the Press Division in the Media Sector and the Foreign Media Department in the mid-eighties.
