= Assimina Maoulida =

French footballer (born 2002)

Personal information
- Date of birth: 30 January 2002 (age 24)
- Place of birth: Blois, France
- Position: Defender

Team information
- Current team: Reims
- Number: 41

Senior career*
Years	Team	Apps	(Gls)
2018–2020	Orléans	28	(1)
2020–2021	Lyon	0	(0)
2021	Le Havre	9	(0)
2021–2022	Issy	16	(0)
2022–2024	Lyon B		
2024	→ Fleury (loan)	6	(0)
2024–	Reims	15	(0)

International career^{‡}
2018	France U16	4	(0)
2018–2019	France U17	8	(0)
2019–2020	France U19	5	(0)
2019	France U20	4	(0)
2025–	Comoros	2	(0)
- * Club domestic league appearances and goals as of 23 April 2025. ‡ National team caps and goals as of 7 April 2025.

Assimina Maoulida (Arabic: أسيمينا ماوليدا; born 30 January 2002) is a professional footballer who plays as a centre-back for Première Ligue club Reims. Born in France, she plays for the Comoros national team

== International goals ==
No.	Date	Venue	Opponent	Score	Result	Competition
1.	4 June 2026	Larbi Zaouli Stadium, Casablanca, Morocco	Sudan	10–0	17–0	2028 CAF Women's Olympic Qualifying Tournament
2.	8 June 2026	Larbi Zaouli Stadium, Casablanca, Morocco	Sudan	4–0	13–0	2028 CAF Women's Olympic Qualifying Tournament
3.	8 June 2026	Larbi Zaouli Stadium, Casablanca, Morocco	Sudan	7–0	13–0	2028 CAF Women's Olympic Qualifying Tournament
