= CAF Women's Olympic qualifying tournament =

African women's football tournament

The Confederation of African Football (CAF) organizes a quadrennial qualification tournament for African nations to gain entry into the women's tournament at every Summer Olympic Games event since its introduction at the 1996 edition of the Games in Atlanta, Georgia, United States.

== Results ==
Olympics	Qualifying tournament	#CAF Berths	Qualified teams		Notes
1996	(1995 World Cup)	N/A	None		Top seven teams in the World Cup were to qualify
2000	(1999 World Cup)	N/A	Nigeria		Top seven teams in the World Cup were to qualify
2004	Qualifying tournament	1	Nigeria		
2008	Qualifying tournament	1.5	Nigeria		Second-placed team (Ghana) lost play-off to Brazil
2012	Qualifying tournament	2	Cameroon	South Africa	
2016	Qualifying tournament	2	South Africa	Zimbabwe	
2020	Qualifying tournament	1.5	Zambia		Second-placed team (Cameroon) lost play-off to Chile
2024	Qualifying tournament	2	Nigeria	Zambia	
2028	Qualifying tournament	2	(N/A)	(N/A)	
