= Sudan women's national football team =

Women's national association football team representing Sudan

Sudan
- Association: Sudan Football Association (SFA)
- Confederation: CAF (Africa)
- Sub-confederation: CECAFA (East & Central Africa)
- Head coach: Imed Houjly
- Captain: Fatima Kidal
- Top scorer: Rawan Abdelmoneim; Rayan Ragab (1)
- FIFA code: SDN

FIFA ranking
- Current: 194 (16 June 2026)
- Highest: 194 (16 June 2026)
- Lowest: 194 (16 June 2026)

First international
- Egypt 10–0 Sudan (Cairo, Egypt; 24 August 2021)

Biggest defeat
- Sudan 0–17 Comoros (Casablanca, Morocco; 4 June 2026)

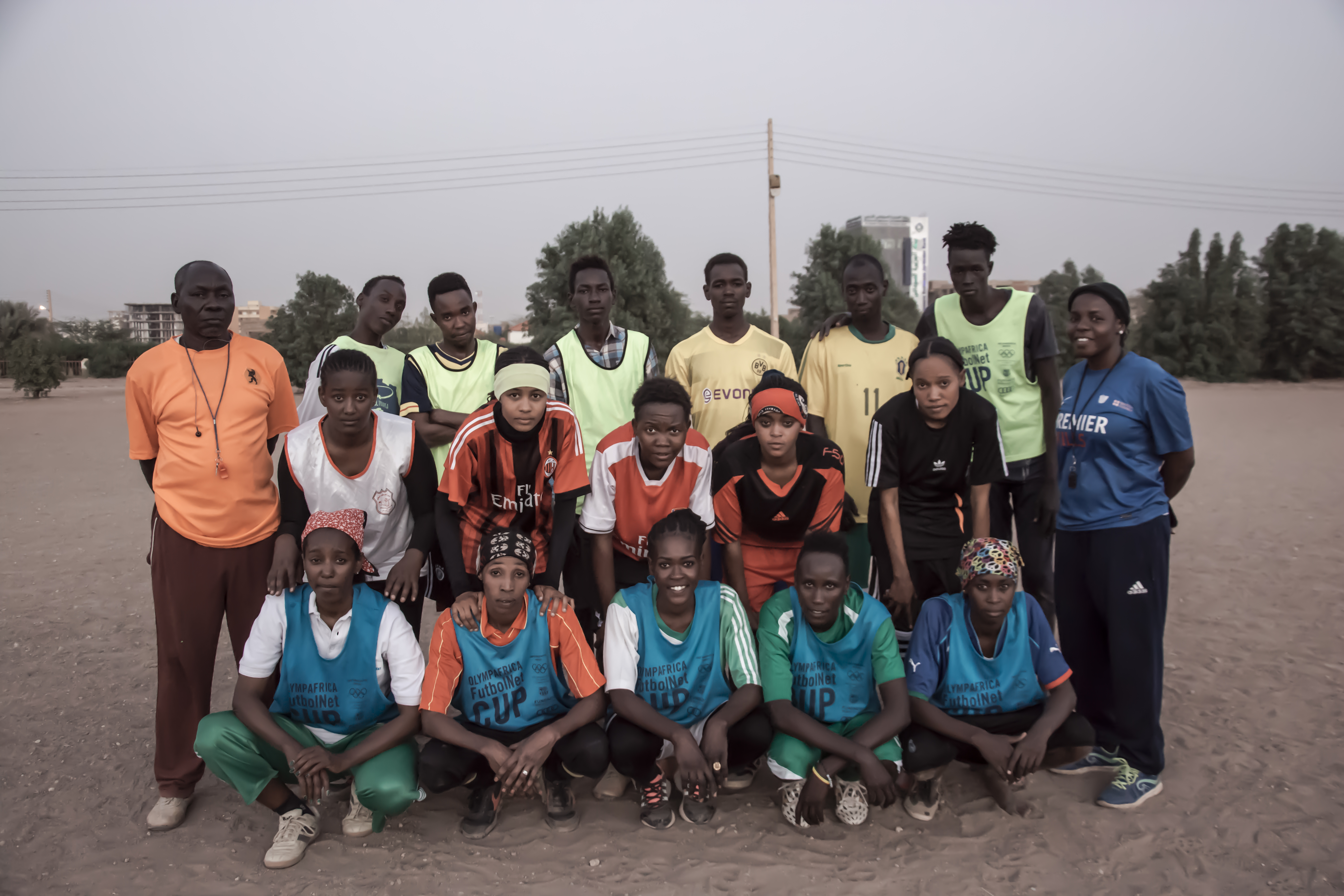
The Challenge, the unofficial Sudanese national women's football team, in 2018

The Sudan women's national football team (Arabic: منتخب السودان لكرة القدم للسيدات) is the official women's national football team of the country of Sudan. The team was established in 2021, and is controlled by the Sudan Football Association (SFA), the governing body for football in Sudan.

Women were not allowed to officially participate in sports such as football, until the Sudanese revolution of 2018–19 abolished the former restrictive public order laws. In September 2019, a women's league with 21 teams from different cities in Sudan was established. The national team first qualified for the 2021 Arab Women's Cup, organized by the Union of Arab Football Associations (UAFA) in Cairo, Egypt.

== History ==
=== Background ===
The Sudan Football Association, which was founded in 1946, and became FIFA affiliated in 1948, was one of the founding members of the Confederation of African Football (CAF), and continues to be a member of the Confederation.

According to a 2011 study of the relationship between religious fundamentalism and globalized societies, the fact that some Sudanese women already had started playing football since the early 2000s despite social and legal restrictions was considered a critical step for the development of an unofficial women's league. As part of this informal league, a first national women's team called The Challenge was created in 2006 in Khartoum. In 2006, The Challenge played its first competitive match. It was captained by Sara Edward and played against a team from Sudan University that wore clothes corresponding to Islamic norms. As reported, the quality of play was not high and the game ended in a 2–0 win for The Challenge team.

In response to a question from FIFA regarding the feasibility of creating a women's national team in 2012, the Islamic Fiqh Council issued another fatwa against the creation of a women's soccer team, deeming it an immoral act. The fatwa claimed that football was a men's sport and women should not participate in it, because it challenges the differences between men and women.

=== Recognition ===
Following the establishment of a women's league in 2019 with 21 teams from different cities under the new transitional government, the Sudan Football Association recognized and started to support women's local and national teams. At the start of 2021, Sudan's women's national team continued to lack FIFA recognition. By August of that year, however, it had been recognized by the Confederation of African Football (CAF) and was invited to participate in the 2021 Arab Women's Cup.

Since its official recognition in 2019, Sudan joined other countries in the Arab and African regions to have a women's league. Due to its membership in the Union of Arab Football Associations (UAFA), the national team's first international competition was in 2021, when they played in the Arab Women's Cup.

== In popular media ==
The 2019 award-winning documentary Khartoum Offside by Sudanese filmmaker Marwa Zein tells the story of the women who made up The Challenge team under the Islamist government of the time.

== Results and fixtures ==
The following is a list of match results in the last 12 months, as well as any future matches that have been scheduled.

Source: Goalzz.com

Legend

Win Draw Lose Fixture

=== 2026 ===
4 June 2026 2028 Olympic Qualification First round	Sudan	0–17	Comoros	Casablanca, Morocco
15:00 UTC+3		Report	Saïd Madjiri 8'; Al. Saïd 17', 42'; Boina Ali 31', 39', 54'; H. Ahamada 33', 49', 66', 89'; Dahmani 37'; Housseni 46'; Maoulida 52'; Anduma 56'; Houmadi 59', 87'; D. Saïd 69'	Stadium: Larbi Zaouli Stadium; Referee: Suzana Semere Yohannes (Eritrea)

8 June 2026 2028 Olympic Qualification First round	Comoros	13–0 (30–0 agg.)	Sudan	Casablanca, Morocco
18:00 UTC+1	Houmadi 12', 26', 67', 71'; Hadhirami Ali 40'; Maoulida 48', 62'; Haoudadji 53'; D. Saïd 57'; Ali 75'; H. Ahamada 85', 90+6'; Hassani 90+4'	Report		Stadium: Larbi Zaouli Stadium; Referee: Seonyatseng Tshephe (Botswana)

== Coaching staff ==
=== Current coaching staff ===
As of 1 February 2022

Position	Name	Ref.
Head coach	(Sudan) Imed Houjly	
Assistant coach	(Sudan) Salma Majdi	
Goalkeeping coach	(Sudan) Khaled Darwich	
Physical coach	(Sudan) Soujoud Hafedh	

=== Manager history ===
As of 9 August 2021

- (Sudan) Faroug Jabra (2021–2022)
- (Sudan) Imed Houjly (2022–present)

== Players ==
=== Current squad ===
The following players were called up for the friendly match against South Sudan in February 2022.

No.	Pos.	Player	Date of birth (age)	Caps	Goals	Club
	GK	Amina Omar Liwaa			0	(Sudan Football Association) Al Hilal Dalang
	GK	Houda Ali			0	(Sudan Football Association)
	DF	Raghda Bader Idin			0	(Sudan Football Association)
	DF	Asmaa Abkar Abdallah			0	(Sudan Football Association) Al-Difaa
	DF	Rania Babker Babo Amer	28 October 1996 (age 29)		0	(Sudan Football Association) Al-Tahadi
	DF	Najlaa Saleh	10 November 1988 (age 37)		0	(Sudan Football Association) Al-Tahadi
	DF	Samia Kassam Hussein	11 December 1995 (age 30)		0	(Sudan Football Association) Al-Tahadi
	MF	Nidal Fadlallah	10 November 1987 (age 38)		0	(Sudan Football Association) Al-Tahadi
	MF	Fatima Kidal (captain)			0	(Sudan Football Association) Al-Difaa
	MF	Bkhaite Elias			0	(Sudan Football Association) Al-Difaa
	MF	Hala Zakaria Mostafi	31 July 1990 (age 36)		0	(Sudan Football Association) Al-Tahadi
	FW	Rayan Ibrahim Ahmed Ragab	1 January 1993 (age 33)		1	(Sudan Football Association) Al-Tahadi
	FW	Rawan Samir			0	
	FW	Faten Zaher			0	(Sudan Football Association) Alkournuk
		Noura Mouhamed			0	(Sudan Football Association)
		Islem Imad			0	(Sudan Football Association)
		Ilmhem Baltoun			0	(Sudan Football Association)
		Fatma Abed Kader			0	(Sudan Football Association)
		Orjuan Essam				(Sudan Football Association)

=== Recent call-ups ===
The following players have been called up to the squad in the past 12 months.

Pos.	Player	Date of birth (age)	Caps	Goals	Club	Latest call-up
^{INJ} Player withdrew from the squad due to an injury.^{PRE} Preliminary squad.^{SUS} Player is serving a suspension.^{WD} Player withdrew for personal reasons.

== Records ==
*Active players in bold, statistics correct as of 26 August 2021.

=== Most capped players ===
#	Player	Year(s)	Caps

=== Top goalscorers ===
As of 20 October 2021

#	Player	Year(s)	Goals	Caps
**1**	Rawan Abdelmoneim	2021–	1	4
**2**	Rayan Ragab	2021–	1	4

== Competitive record ==
=== FIFA Women's World Cup ===
FIFA Women's World Cup record
Year	Round	GP	W	D*	L	GS	GA	GD
(China) 1991 to (Canada) 2015	did not exist							
(France) 2019	did not enter							
(Australia) (New Zealand) 2023	Withdrew							
(Brazil) 2027	did not enter							
(Costa Rica) (Jamaica) (Mexico) (United States) 2031	To be determined							
(United Kingdom) 2035	To be determined							
**Total**	0/5	0	0	0	0	0	0	0

*Draws include knockout matches decided on penalty kicks.

=== Olympic Games ===
Summer Olympics record
Year	Result	Pld	W	D*	L	GS	GA	GD
(United States) 1996 to (Japan) 2020	did not exist							
(France) 2024	did not enter							
(United States) 2028	did not qualify							
Total	0/9	0	0	0	0	0	0	0

*Draws include knockout matches decided on penalty kicks.

=== Africa Women Cup of Nations ===
Africa Women Cup of Nations record
Year	Round	GP	W	D*	L	GS	GA	GD
1991 to (Namibia) 2014	did not exist							
(Cameroon) 2016 to (Ghana) 2018	did not enter							
2020	Cancelled due to COVID-19 pandemic in Africa							
(Morocco) 2022	did not enter							
(Morocco) 2024	did not enter							
(Morocco) 2026	did not enter							
**Total**	0/14	0	0	0	0	0	0	0

*Draws include knockout matches decided on penalty kicks.

=== African Games ===
African Games record
Year	Result	Matches	Wins	Draws	Losses	GF	GA	GD
(Nigeria) 2003 to (Morocco) 2019	did not exist							
(Ghana) 2023	See U-20 team							
Total	0/4	0	0	0	0	0	0	0

=== CECAFA Women's Championship ===
CECAFA Women's Championship
Year	Round	GP	W	D*	L	GS	GA	GD
(Zanzibar) 1986 to (Tanzania) 2019	did not exist							
(Tanzania) 2021	Cancelled							
(Uganda) 2022	did not enter							
**Total**	0/5	0	0	0	0	0	0	0

=== Arab Women's Cup ===
Arab Women's Cup record
Appearances: 2
Year	Round	Position	Pld	W	D	L	GF	GA	GD
(Egypt) 2006	did not exist								
(Egypt) 2021	Group stage	6th	3	0	0	3	2	27	−25
Total	Groupe stage	1/2	3	0	0	2	27	−25	

== All−time record against FIFA recognized nations ==
The list shown below shows the Sudan national football team all−time international record against opposing nations.
*As of 22 February 2022 after match against South Sudan.

Key

Positive balance (more wins than losses)
Neutral balance (as many wins as losses)
Negative balance (more losses than wins)

Against	Pld	W	D	L	GF	GA	GD	Confederation
Algeria	2	0	0	2	0	17	−17	CAF
South Sudan	2	0	0	2	0	9	−9	CAF
Tunisia	1	0	0	1	1	12	−11	CAF
Egypt	1	0	0	1	0	10	−10	CAF
Lebanon	1	0	0	1	1	5	−4	AFC

== See also ==
- Sport in Sudan
  - Football in Sudan
    - Women's football in Sudan
- Sudan women's national under-20 football team
- Sudan women's national under-17 football team
- Sudan men's national football team
- Women's association football
