= Mauritania national beach soccer team =

Sports team representing Mauritania

Mauritania
- Nickname: Al-Murabitun (الْمُرَابِطُون)
- Association: Football Federation of the Islamic Republic of Mauritania
- Confederation: CAF (Africa)
- Head coach: Moussa Baghayogho
- Captain: Mohamed Diallo
- FIFA code: MTN
- BSWW ranking: 23 (2 September 2026)
First colours
Second colours

World Cup
- Appearances: 1 (first in 2025)
- Best result: Group stage (2025)

Beach Soccer Africa Cup of Nations
- Appearances: 1 (first in 2024)
- Best result: Runners-up (2024)
Medal record
Men's Football
African Nations Championship
Silver medal – second place	2024 Egypt	Team

The Mauritania national beach soccer team represents Mauritania in international beach soccer competitions and is controlled by the Football Federation of the Islamic Republic of Mauritania, the governing body for football in Mauritania. The team qualified for the Beach Soccer Africa Cup of Nations for the first time in 2024, they finished second in their first participation, which will make their debut at the FIFA Beach Soccer World Cup in 2025 when they eliminated from the group stage.

== History ==
The Mauritania beach soccer team was created in 2010, but it only really got going in 2020 due to a lack of infrastructure and resources. The team's first participation was in the 2023 Arab Beach Soccer Cup in Egypt and was eliminated in the quarter-finals after the defeat against the host country 3–8. The team qualified for the Beach Soccer Africa Cup of Nations finals for the first time in 2024 after eliminating Nigeria from the qualifying round on away goals rule after a 10–10 draw in both matches.

In the finals in Egypt, the team entered strongly in Group B where they defeated Senegal, the title holders and the most successful team in the tournament history 5−2. In the second match, the team lost on penalties to Mozambique 1–4 after a 3–3 draw in extra time. In the third match, Mauritania achieved a resounding victory after defeating Malawi 11–6, and the team advanced to the semi-finals at the top of the group. In the semi-finals, Mauritania swept Morocco 7–4, and the team advanced to the final match to face Senegal again and qualified for the 2025 FIFA Beach Soccer World Cup for the first time. However, the team was shocked by a heavy defeat 1−6 against the experienced Senegalese team and get the silver medal.

The performance in the World Cup did not rise, as the team suffered three defeats and was eliminated from the group stage. Mauritania competed in Group B alongside Iran, Portugal and Paraguay. The team lost the first match against Iran 4−5, the second match against Portugal, double world champions 4−8 and the final match against Paraguay 5−9. Mauritania left the tournament at the bottom of the group with three defeats, having scored 13 goals and conceded 22.

== Competitive record ==
=== FIFA Beach Soccer World Cup ===
FIFA Beach Soccer World Cup record
Year	Round	Position	Pld	W	W+	L	GF	GA
(Brazil) 2005 to (Russia) 2021	Did not exist							
(United Arab Emirates) 2024	Did not enter							
(Seychelles) 2025	Group stage	14th	3	0	0	3	13	22
Total	Group stage	1/1	3	0	0	3	13	22

=== Beach Soccer Africa Cup of Nations ===
Beach Soccer Africa Cup of Nations record
Year	Round	Position	Pld	W	W+	L	GF	GA
(South Africa) 2006 to (Senegal) 2021	Did not exist							
(Mozambique) 2022	Did not enter							
(Egypt) 2024	Runners-up	2nd	5	3	0	2	27	21
Total	Runners-up	1/1	5	3	0	2	27	21

=== Arab Beach Soccer Cup ===
Arab Beach Soccer Cup record
Year	Round	Position	Pld	W	W+	L	GF	GA
(Egypt) 2008 to (Egypt) 2014	Did not enter							
(Saudi Arabia) 2023	Group stage	–	4	2	0	2	15	22
Total	Group stage	1/1	4	2	0	2	15	22

== Current squad ==
The following players and staff members were called up for the 2025 FIFA Beach Soccer World Cup.

Coach: Moussa Baghayoko

No.	Pos.	Player	Date of birth (age)	Club
1	GK	Hacen Abeidi	1 December 2000 (aged 24)	(Football Federation of the Islamic Republic of Mauritania) AS Vallee
2	DF	Ahmedou Bilal	16 January 2000 (aged 25)	(Football Federation of the Islamic Republic of Mauritania) Chemal FC
3	DF	Mohamed Diallo	14 January 1997 (aged 28)	(Royal Moroccan Football Federation) Olympic Sirghini
4	DF	El Bechir El Id	13 March 2000 (aged 25)	(Football Federation of the Islamic Republic of Mauritania) Chemal FC
5	DF	Mahmoud Samba	10 January 2000 (aged 25)	(Football Federation of the Islamic Republic of Mauritania) AS Riyad
6	MF	Hamdy Salem	20 June 1998 (aged 26)	(Football Federation of the Islamic Republic of Mauritania) FC Arafat
7	FW	Cheikh Belkheir	7 December 2004 (aged 20)	(Royal Moroccan Football Federation) IRT Tanger
8	FW	Bidjati Malick	14 July 1996 (aged 28)	(Football Federation of the Islamic Republic of Mauritania) FC Tensoueilim
9	MF	Abdel Aziz Diop	3 April 2002 (aged 23)	(Football Federation of the Islamic Republic of Mauritania) Inter Nouakchott
10	MF	El Hadj Niang	2 December 1991 (aged 33)	(Football Federation of the Islamic Republic of Mauritania) ASAC Concorde
11	FW	Mohamedou Ely	15 August 2003 (aged 21)	(Football Federation of the Islamic Republic of Mauritania) Chemal FC
12	GK	Abdoul Latif Sy	11 December 1998 (aged 26)	(Football Federation of the Islamic Republic of Mauritania) AS Vallee

== Honours ==
- Beach Soccer Africa Cup of Nations

Runners-up: 2024

- Arab Beach Soccer Cup

Runners-up: 2026
