= Football in Sudan =

- Country: Sudan
- Governing body: Sudan Football Association
- National team: national football team

Club competitions
- Sudan Premier League; Sudan Cup

International competitions
- CAF Champions League; CAF Confederation Cup; CAF Super Cup; FIFA Club World Cup; FIFA World Cup (National Team); African Cup of Nations (National Team)

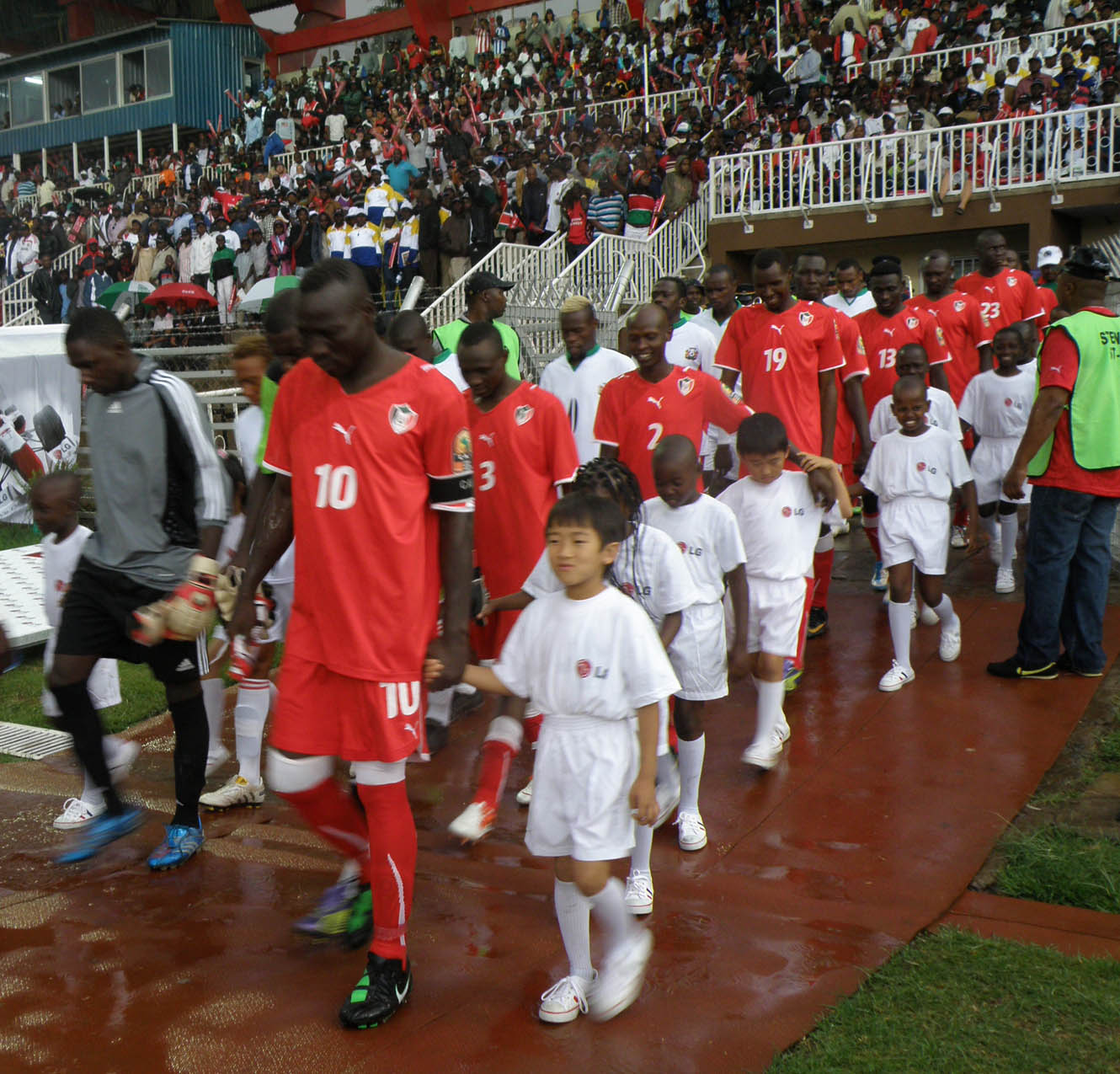
The Sudan national football team in red jerseys.

The sport of football in the North-East African country of Sudan is managed by the Sudan Football Association. The association administers the national football team, as well as the Premier League. The Sudan Football Association, which was founded in 1946, and FIFA affiliated in 1948, was one of the founding members of the Confederation of African Football, and continues to be a member of the Confederation. Football is the most popular sport in Sudan, as it is in almost every country. Approximately 30% of Sudanese people are considered football fans.

Since at least 2006, there was also an unofficial Sudan women's national football team, trained by a male coach. Since September 2019, there has been an official national league for women's football clubs that started on the basis of informal women's clubs since the beginning of the 2000s. In 2021, the Sudan women's national football team participated for the first time in the Arab Women's Cup, held in Cairo, Egypt.

== Football stadiums in Sudan ==
Rank	Stadium	City	Capacity	Tenants	Image
1	Al-Merrikh Stadium	Omdurman	43,000	Al-Merrikh SC	
2	Al-Hilal Stadium	Omdurman	25,000	Al-Hilal Club	
3	Khartoum Stadium	Khartoum	23,000	Khartoum NC	
4	Nyala Olympic Stadium	Nyala	20,000		
5	Port Sudan Stadium	Port Sudan	20,000	Hay al-Arab, Hilal al-Sahil	
6	Wad Madani Stadium	Wad Madani	15,000	Al-Ittihad SC	
7	Atbara Stadium	Atbara	15,000	Al-Amal SC	
8	Al-Merghani Kassala Stadium	Kassala	11,000		

== Attendances ==
The average attendance per top-flight football league season and the club with the highest average attendance:

Season	League average	Best club	Best club average
2018-19	3,534	Al-Hilal SC	11,250

Source: League page on Wikipedia

== See also ==
- Sudan men's national football team
- Sudan women's national football team
- Lists of stadiums
