= Comoros women's national football team =

Women's national association football team representing Comoros

Comoros
- Nickname: Coelacanths
- Association: Comoros Football Federation
- Confederation: CAF
- Sub-confederation: COSAFA (Southern Africa)
- Head coach: Anissa Maoulida
- Captain: Zaharouna Haoudadji
- Top scorer: Anlaouia Hadhirami Ali (8)
- FIFA code: COM
First colours	Second colours

FIFA ranking
- Current: 187 ▲2 (16 June 2026)
- Highest: 139 (December 2020)
- Lowest: 190 (December 2025)

First international
- Mozambique 7–2 Comoros (Maputo, Mozambique; 28 October 2006)

Biggest win
- Sudan 0–17 Comoros (Casablanca, Morocco; 4 June 2026)

Biggest defeat
- South Africa 17–0 Comoros (Port Elizabeth, South Africa; 31 July 2019)

The Comoros women's national football team is the national women's football team of the Comoros and is overseen by the Comoros Football Federation. They played their first match on 28 October 2006.

== History ==
Comoros played its first international match at the 2008 Olympics qualifiers against Mozambique, on 28 October 2006. The result was a 7–2 loss.

They had scheduled two matches against Mozambique in February 2014, for the 2014 African Women's Championship qualification, but the opposing team withdrew. Comoros advanced by walkover to the second round against South Africa on 23 May 2014, which they lost 13–0. Following the heavy defeat, Comoros withdrew and did not play the return leg.

In December 2016, Comoros played two friendlies against Madagascar, both ending in 4–0 defeats.

In the 2019 COSAFA Women's Championship, in July, Comoros suffered their worst loss to date to South Africa, a match which ended 17–0.

At the 2020 COSAFA Women's Championship, the national team suffered a 4–2 loss to Eswatini and a 7–0 loss to South Africa, but managed a 1–1 draw against Angola, the first in its history.

== Home stadium ==
The Comoros women's national football team play its home matches on the Stade Said Mohamed Cheikh.

== Results and fixtures ==
The following is a list of match results in the last 12 months, as well as any future matches that have been scheduled.

Legend

Win Draw Lose Fixture

=== 2026 ===
16 April Friendly	Tunisia	2–1	Comoros	Manouba, Tunisia
14:00	Nouhaili 3'; Abbassi 77'		Dahmani 5'	Stadium: Manouba Sports Complex; Referee: Sirine Abdelmalek (Tunisia)

4 June 2026 2028 Olympic Qualification First round	Sudan	0–17	Comoros	Casablanca, Morocco
15:00 UTC+3		Report	Saïd Madjiri 8'; Al. Saïd 17', 42'; Boina Ali 31', 39', 54'; H. Ahamada 33', 49', 66', 89'; Dahmani 37'; Housseni 46'; Maoulida 52'; Anduma 56'; Houmadi 59', 87'; D. Saïd 69'	Stadium: Larbi Zaouli Stadium; Referee: Suzana Semere Yohannes (Eritrea)

8 June 2026 2028 Olympic Qualification First round	Comoros	13–0 (30–0 agg.)	Sudan	Casablanca, Morocco
18:00 UTC+1	Houmadi 12', 26', 67', 71'; Hadhirami Ali 40'; Maoulida 48', 62'; Haoudadji 53'; D. Saïd 57'; Ali 75'; H. Ahamada 85', 90+6'; Hassani 90+4'	Report		Stadium: Larbi Zaouli Stadium; Referee: Seonyatseng Tshephe (Botswana)

- Fixtures and results at FIFA.com
- Fixtures and results at Global Sports Archive
- Fixtures and results at Soccerway

== Coaching staff ==
=== Current coaching staff ===
As of 8 June 2026

Position	Name	Ref.
Head coach	(Comoros) Anissa Maoulida	
Technical Staff / Assistant	(Comoros) Mohamed Bouhari	

==== Manager history ====
- (Comoros) Choudjay Mahandhi (2020–2021)
- (Republic of the Congo) Pascal Koutala (2022)
- (Comoros) Choudjay Mahandhi (2023–2024)
- (Comoros) Anissa Maoulida (2024–present)

== Players ==
=== Current squad ===
The following players were called up for the 2028 Olympic Qualifiers against Sudan on 4 and 8 June 2026.

No.	Pos.	Player	Date of birth (age)	Club
1	GK	Aïcha Saïd	25 October 2005 (age 20)	(French Football Federation) Albi Marssac TF
16	GK	Cayana Abderemane	16 March 2005 (age 21)	(French Football Federation) ASPTT Marseille
2	DF	Alicia Chanfi	28 November 2002 (age 23)	(French Football Federation) Saint-Maur
4	DF	Aalyah Samadi	5 January 2007 (age 19)	(French Football Federation) Olympique Lyonnais B
12	DF	Nousrat Mistoihi	24 January 2005 (age 21)	(Comoros Football Federation) FC Ouani
13	DF	Bibi Raissa Housseni	28 January 2002 (age 24)	(French Football Federation) Olympique de Marseille
20	DF	Cayissa Abderemane	16 March 2005 (age 21)	(French Football Federation) ASPTT Marseille
22	DF	Aliya Saïd	14 February 1998 (age 28)	(French Football Federation) Chassieu-Décines
23	DF	Assimina Maoulida	30 January 2002 (age 24)	(French Football Federation) Stade de Reims
3	MF	Yousra Ahamadi	5 October 2003 (age 23)	(French Football Federation) Olympique de Marseille
6	MF	Fatima Saïd Madjiri	13 January 1999 (age 27)	(French Football Federation) ES Paris 16
7	MF	Soiyfati Ali	28 November 2003 (age 22)	(French Football Federation) ES La Ciotat
10	MF	Faïza Houmadi	30 September 2000 (age 26)	(French Football Federation) Olympique de Marseille
11	MF	Saminat Abdou Mgomri	8 June 2005 (age 21)	(French Football Federation) Olympique de Marseille
17	MF	Zaharouna Haoudadji (Captain)	3 June 2000 (age 26)	(French Football Federation) Quevilly-Rouen
18	MF	Irma Ibrahim Ahmed	11 January 2003 (age 23)	(French Football Federation) US Orléans
	MF	Neila Dahmani	12 May 2004 (age 22)	(French Football Federation) AAS Sarcelles
	MF	Diore Saïd	19 August 2003 (age 23)	(French Football Federation) ES Paris 16
5	FW	Nafou Saïd	8 November 2000 (age 25)	(Ligue mahoraise de football) AS Jumelles
8	FW	Anllaouia Hadhirami Ali	9 March 2003 (age 23)	(Comoros Football Federation) Olympic de Moroni
9	FW	Haloua Ahamada	24 January 1995 (age 31)	(French Football Federation) CPB Bréquigny
15	FW	Nasrati Saïd Ali	12 August 2006 (age 20)	(Comoros Football Federation) Olympic de Moroni
19	FW	Hanna'a Chamsoudine	12 July 2007 (age 19)	(French Football Federation) Stade de Reims
21	FW	Fatima Ahmed Combo	4 January 2004 (age 22)	(Comoros Football Federation) Etoile du Centre

=== Recent call-ups ===
The following players have also been called up to the Comoros squad within the last 12 months.

Pos.	Player	Date of birth (age)	Caps	Goals	Club	Latest call-up
MF	Neila Dahmani	12 May 2004 (age 22)	-	-	(France) AAS Sarcelles	v. Tunisia, 16 April 2026

=== Previous squads ===
COSAFA Women's Championship

- 2020 COSAFA Women's Championship squad
- 2022 COSAFA Women's Championship squad
- 2023 COSAFA Women's Championship squad
- 2024 COSAFA Women's Championship squad

== Records ==
As of 7 April 2025

=== Most capped players ===
#	Player	Year(s)	Caps

=== Top goalscorers ===
Rank	Player	Goals
1	Hairiat Abdourahmane	5
1	Anlaouia Hadhirami Ali	5
3	Halima Attoumane	2
3	Nourdati Mohamed Boinali	2
5	Haloua Ahamada	1
5	Roukiat Mohamed Ahamadi	1
5	Hanna'a Chamsoudine	1
5	Alicia Chanfi	1
5	Zaharouna Haoudadji	1
5	Wafat Mari	1
5	Aliya Saïd	1

== Competitive record ==
=== FIFA Women's World Cup ===
FIFA Women's World Cup record
Year	Result	GP	W	D*	L	GF	GA	GD
(China) 1991	did not exist							
(Sweden) 1995	did not exist							
(United States) 1999	did not exist							
(United States) 2003	did not exist							
(China) 2007	did not enter							
(Germany) 2011	did not enter							
(Canada) 2015	did not qualify							
(France) 2019	did not enter							
(Australia) (New Zealand) 2023	did not enter							
(Brazil) 2027	did not qualify							
(Costa Rica) (Jamaica) (Mexico) (United States) 2031	To be determined							
(United Kingdom) 2035	To be determined							
Total	0/12	-	-	-	-	-	-	-

=== Olympic Games ===
Summer Olympics record
Year	Result	Pld	W	D*	L	GS	GA	GD
(United States) 1996	did not exist							
(Australia) 2000	did not exist							
(Greece) 2004	did not exist							
(China) 2008	did not Qualify							
(United Kingdom) 2012	did not enter							
(Brazil) 2016	did not enter							
(Japan) 2020	did not enter							
(France) 2024	did not enter							
(United States) 2028	To be determined							
Total	0/9	0	0	0	0	0	0	0

*Draws include knockout matches decided on penalty kicks.

=== Africa Women Cup of Nations ===
Africa Women Cup of Nations record
Year	Result	Matches	Wins	Draws	Losses	GF	GA
1991 to (South Africa) 2004	Did not exist						
(Nigeria) 2006 to (Equatorial Guinea) 2012	Did not enter						
(Namibia) 2014	Did not Qualify						
(Cameroon) 2016	Did not enter						
(Ghana) 2018	Did not enter						
(Republic of the Congo) 2020	Cancelled due to COVID-19 pandemic in Africa						
(Morocco) 2022	Did not enter						
(Morocco) 2024	Did not enter						
(Morocco) 2026	Did not enter						
Total	0/14	-	-	-	-	-	-

=== African Games ===
African Games record
Year	Result	Matches	Wins	Draws	Losses	GF	GA	GD
(Nigeria) 2003	Did Not exist							
(Algeria) 2007	Did Not enter							
(Mozambique) 2011	Did Not enter							
(Republic of the Congo) 2015	Did Not enter							
(Morocco) 2019	See Comoros women's national under-20 football team							
(Ghana) 2023	See Comoros women's national under-20 football team							
(Egypt) 2027	to be determined							
Total	0/5	0	0	0	0	0	0	

=== Regional ===
==== COSAFA Women's Championship ====
COSAFA Women's Championship record
Year	Round	Pld	W	D*	L	GS	GA	GD
(Zimbabwe) 2002	did not exist							
(Zambia) 2006	did not enter							
(Angola) 2008	did not enter							
(Zimbabwe) 2011	did not enter							
(Zimbabwe) 2017	did not enter							
(South Africa) 2018	did not enter							
(South Africa) 2019	Group stage	3	0	0	3	1	35	−34
(South Africa) 2020	Group stage	3	0	1	2	3	12	−9
(South Africa) 2021	did not enter							
(South Africa) 2022	Group stage	3	0	0	3	0	15	−15
(South Africa) 2023	Group stage	3	0	0	3	2	13	-11
Total	Group stage	12	0	1	11	6	75	−69

*Draws include knockout matches decided on penalty kicks.

== See also ==
- Sport in the Comoros
  - Football in the Comoros
    - Women's football in the Comoros
- Comoros women's national under-20 football team
- Comoros women's national under-17 football team
- Comoros men's national football team
