= Somalia women's national football team =

Women's national soccer team

Somalia
- Nickname: The Ocean Starlets
- Association: Somali Football Federation (SFF)
- Confederation: CAF
- Sub-confederation: CECAFA
- FIFA code: SOM
First colours	Second colours

FIFA ranking
- Current: NR (16 June 2026)

First international
- Djibouti 4–1 Somalia (Djibouti City, Djibouti; 24 October 2025)

Biggest defeat
- Djibouti 4–1 Somalia (Djibouti City, Djibouti; 24 October 2025)

The Somalia women's national football team represents Somalia in international women's association football. The team is governed by the Somali Football Federation (SFF) and competes in CECAFA and CAF competition.

== History ==
On March 8, 2024, women's football was played in the capital, Mogadishu, for the first time to commemorate International Women's Day with a futsal match. It marked the first official occasion under the federation's governance that Somalia formally engaged with women's football. By November of the same year, the Country organized the first-ever women's football tournament, which was played from 30 October to 10 November 2024.

In October 2025, the national team traveled to Djibouti to play a series of friendly matches against the host nation, marking the first such fixtures in the country's history. The team played its first match on October 24, 2025, losing 4–1 to Les Gazelles.

== Results and fixtures ==
The following is a list of match results in the last 12 months, as well as any future matches that have been scheduled.

Win Draw Loss Fixture

=== 2025 ===
October 24 Friendly	Djibouti	4–1	Somalia	Djibouti City
16:00 EAT	Fardoussa Ali Doubad 27', 68', 85'; Idil Gouled 46' (pen.)		Sundus Okiyaale 12'	Stadium: Douda Academy

== Players ==
=== Current squad ===
No.	Pos.	Player	Date of birth (age)	Club

=== Recent call-ups ===
The following players have been called up to a Mauritius squad in the past 12 months.

Pos.	Player	Date of birth (age)	Caps	Goals	Club	Latest call-up
^{INJ} Player withdrew from the squad due to an injury.^{PRE} Preliminary squad.^{SUS} Player is serving a suspension.^{WD} Player withdrew for personal reasons.
