= Larbi Zaouli Stadium =

Stadium in Casablanca, Morocco

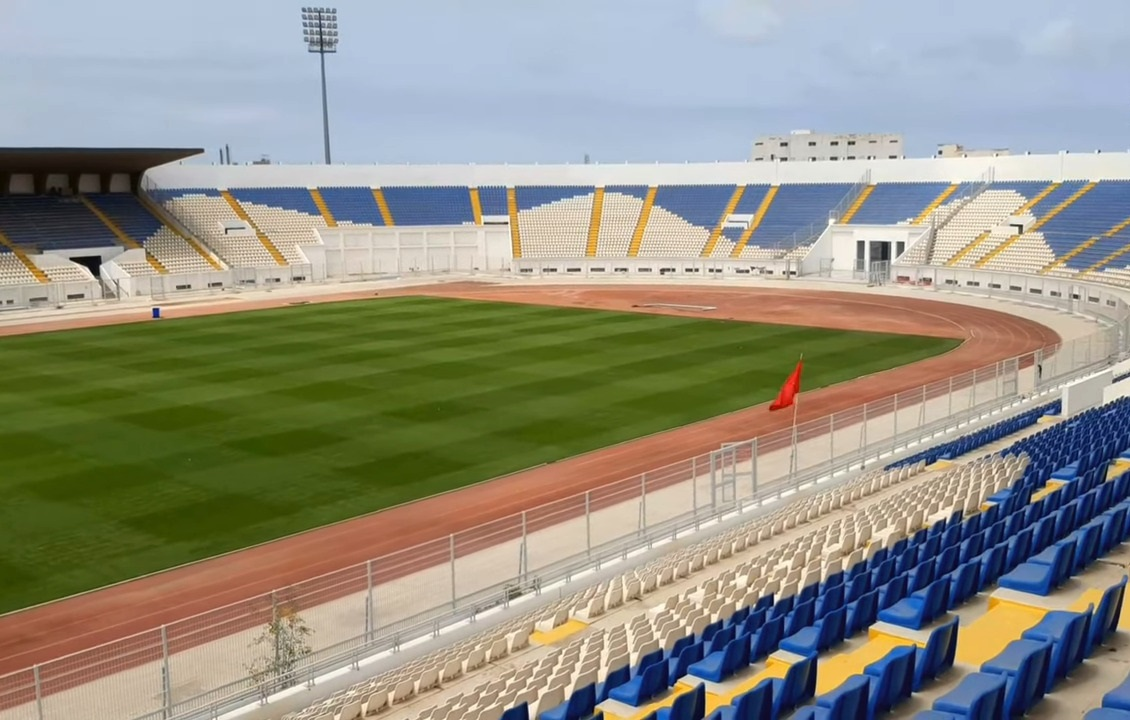
- Interactive map of Larbi Zaouli Stadium
- Location: Casablanca, Morocco
- Coordinates: 33.5972°N 7.5465°W
- Capacity: 18,600
- Surface: Grass

Construction
- Opened: 1930
- Renovated: 2019

Tenants
- TAS Casablanca; SC Casablanca (Women); Raja CA (2024–25); Wydad AC (2024–25)

Larbi Zaouli Stadium is a multi-use stadium in Casablanca, Morocco. It is used mostly for TAS Casablanca & SC Casablanca (Women).
