= South Beach (disambiguation) =

South Beach is a neighborhood in Miami Beach, Florida, U.S.

South Beach may also refer to:

== Places ==
=== Bahamas ===
- South Beach (Bahamas Parliament constituency)

=== South Africa ===
- South Beach, Durban

=== United States ===
- South Beach, San Francisco, California
- South Beach, Florida, in Indian River County
- South Beach, Staten Island, New York City
  - South Beach station
- South Beach, Oregon
  - South Beach State Park

== Arts and entertainment ==
- South Beach (1993 TV series), an American action/adventure series
- South Beach (2006 TV series), an American drama series
- South Beach, a 2004 novel by Aimee Friedman
- "South Beach", a song by Ty Dolla Sign from the 2017 album Beach House 3
- ”South Beach”, a song by Ken Carson from the 2022 album X
- "South Beach", an instrumental by Vicetone

== Other uses ==
- South Beach (nightclub), in Houston, Texas

== See also ==
- South Beaches, in Brevard County, Florida, U.S.
- South Beach Diet, a fad diet
- South Beach Tower, an integrated development in Singapore
