= Bardcore =

Medieval-inspired music genre

- A collection of bardcore remixes of Christmas music
- Etymology: Bard, Hardcore music
- Stylistic origins: Medieval folk rock; neo-medieval music; pop; EDM; power metal
- Cultural origins: Late-2010s, Internet
- Typical instruments: Audio editing software; Lute; Medieval instruments

Fusion genres
- Piratewave

Bardcore (Note: Referring to a bard, a professional storyteller or musician in medieval Gaelic and British culture.) or tavernwave is a musical microgenre that became popular in 2020, consisting of medieval-inspired remakes of popular songs.

== History ==
In December 2017, before the term bardcore was widely known, a medieval version of "Toxicity" by System of a Down was published on YouTube by Algal the Bard. By 2020, it had achieved a few million views.

The Guardian dates the origin of bardcore as a distinct trend to 20 April 2020, during the COVID-19 lockdown, when German YouTuber Cornelius Link released "Astronomia (Medieval Style)". The track is a remake of Tony Igy's 2010 electronic dance track "Astronomia", which had gained widespread attention as the soundtrack to the coffin dance meme. (Note: The term "bardcore" spiked in Google searches in June 2020.)

Link followed this a few weeks later with a medieval-style instrumental version of Foster the People's "Pumped Up Kicks", which Canadian YouTuber Hildegard von Blingin' (a play on the name of the medieval composer Hildegard von Bingen) then re-released with an added vocal track using a medieval-style adaptation of the original lyrics. By the end of June, both versions had reached 4 million views. Hildegard von Blingin' has also covered Lady Gaga's "Bad Romance", Radiohead's "Creep", Dolly Parton's "Jolene", Lana Del Rey's "Summertime Sadness" and Gotye's "Somebody That I Used to Know", changing the rhythm and lyrics to fit the genre.

Wu Tang Clan endorsed Bardcore artist Beedle the Bardcore by reposting his cover of their track C.R.E.A.M. on their official YouTube channel.

The trend was joined by other YouTubers, including Latvian band Auļi, Graywyck, Constantine Bard and Samus Ordicus. Elmira Tanatarova in i-D suggests bardcore "carries with it the weight of years of memes made about the medieval era, and the bleak darkness of that time period that appeals to Gen Z's existential humour." The artwork accompanying bardcore songs in YouTube are frequently medieval-style representations of the song being covered, often in the style of the Bayeux Tapestry or illuminated manuscripts.

While bardcore is primarily an online phenomenon, live acts have begun to appear, such as the French trio Courseval, formed in 2024, which adapts pop songs into French and performs at castles, abbeys and medieval museums. The group appeared on the French edition of The Voice with a medieval version of The Weeknd's "Blinding Lights", sung in French under the title "Les Chandelles".

In October 2020, tracks by prominent Bardcore artists Beedle The Bardcore, Hildegard Von Blingin’, and Stantough were featured on a prime-time BBC Radio 1 show.

== See also ==
- Medieval folk rock
- Medieval metal
- Neo-Medieval music
