= South Jetty (South Beach) =

State park in Newport, Oregon, United States

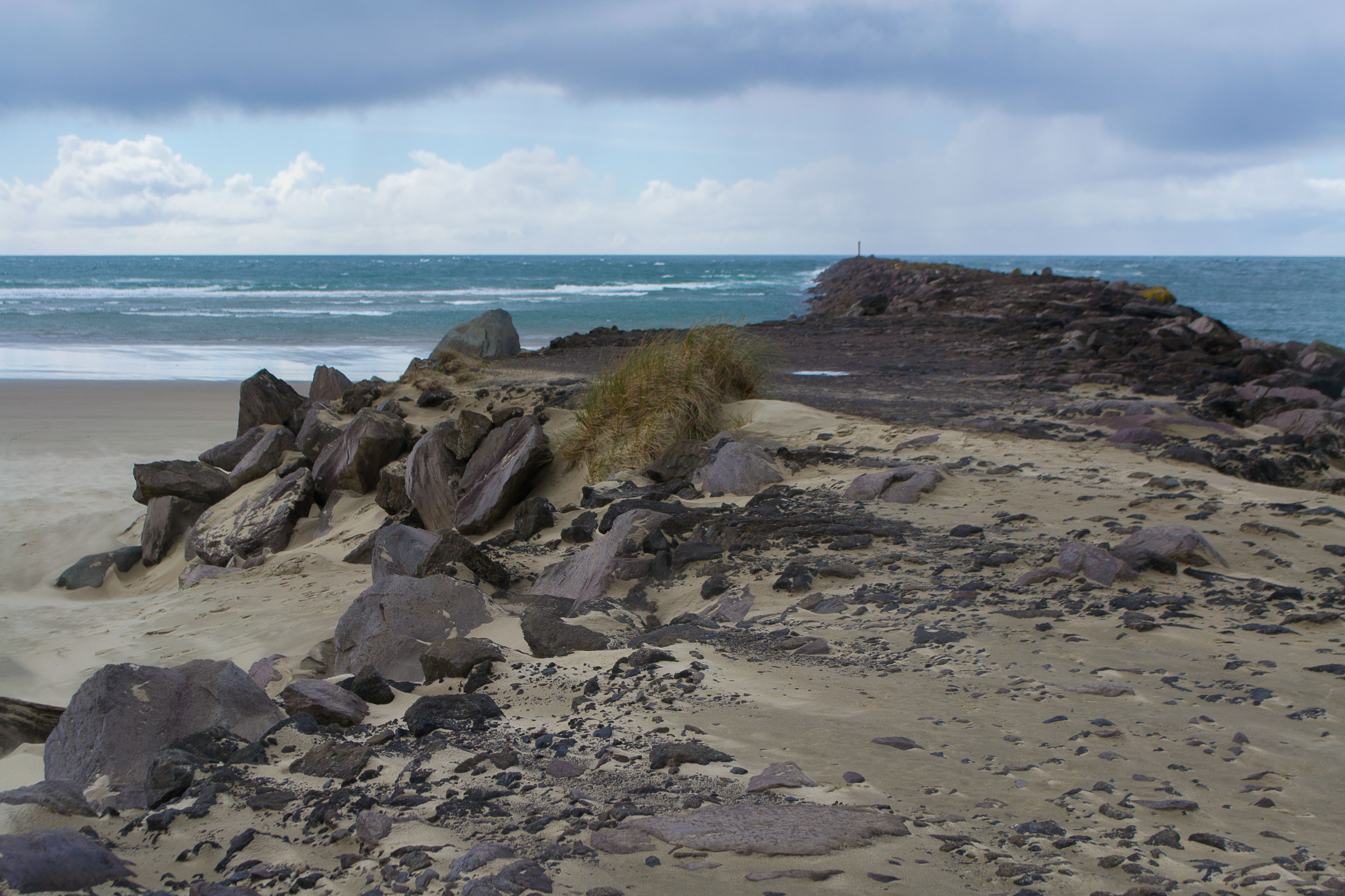

- Location within Oregon Location within the United States
- Type: Public, state
- Location: Newport, Lincoln County, Oregon
- Coordinates: 44°37′00″N 124°03′29″W
- Operator: Oregon Parks and Recreation Department

South Jetty is a state park in Newport, Oregon, U.S.

The park is administered by the Oregon Parks and Recreation Department, and adjacent to South Beach State Park. Both are south of the jetties, which form the entrance to Yaquina Bay, one of Oregon's major fishing and whale watching ports.

Activities at the park include equine access to the sandy beach, surfing, including windsurfing, fishing, scuba diving, and clamming. There are no fees for access or use to the park.

== See also ==
- List of Oregon state parks
