= Green Onion Chex =

South Korean cereal

Green Onion Chex (Korean: 첵스 파맛), commonly known as Pa-mat Chex, was a limited-edition green onion-flavored cereal released by Nongshim in South Korea on July 1, 2020. It originated from an "election" event held in 2004 to promote the mascots of Chex cereal. In the event, Cheki, a chocolate-colored Chex-shaped mascot, and Chaka, a green Chex character and opposing candidate, promised to release milk chocolate-flavored and green onion-flavored cereals, respectively. Contrary to the company's intentions, internet users turned the event into a prank and gave the green onion-flavored candidate more votes. Nongshim Kellogg later invalidated votes it claimed had been cast fraudulently using macros and declared Cheki the winner. However, the incident became an Internet meme as a rigged election, and internet users continued to demand the release of Green Onion Chex.

In response to these demands, Nongshim Kellogg had been researching Green Onion Chex since 2004. In June 2020, the company announced that it would release a limited-edition Chex cereal flavored with green onions, including green onions grown in Yeoju. In a promotional video released before the launch, trot singer Tae Jin-ah appeared singing a parody version of his song "Mian Mianhae". The promotion also used several internet memes, including the coffin dance meme and a "GG" ("Good Game") declaration at the end of the video using the spelling of Kellogg's.

Characteristics of Green Onion Chex included the "green onion flavor" that the product was intended to reproduce from the development stage, a "sweet and salty" taste, and the aroma of green onions. Members of a pre-release tasting group tried Green Onion Chex with various foods, ranging from dairy products such as Milk to dishes such as Seolleongtang and Tteokbokki. People who tried Green Onion Chex generally commented that the cereal did not pair particularly well with milk.

After the release of Green Onion Chex 16 years after the original event, internet users described it as a "victory for Democracy". The marketing campaign for Green Onion Chex also received positive reviews from several media outlets. On November 12, 2020, Nongshim Kellogg won the "Best YouTube New Brand Launch" category at the 2020 YouTube Works Awards, hosted by Google, for Green Onion Chex. Production of the cereal was discontinued in July 2021.

== Background ==
External videos
- Kellogg's Chex Choco presidential election event commercial, part 1
- Kellogg's Chex Choco presidential election event commercial, part 2

On December 1, 2004, Nongshim Kellogg held an election event to promote Cheki, a new chocolate-colored Chex-shaped character. The event asked internet users to elect either Cheki or Chaka, a green Chex character, as the "president of Chex Choco Land". The two candidates, Cheki and Chaka, presented the following campaign pledges, with the explanation that the flavor of the cereal would be determined by the voting results of internet users.

Cheki (Candidate No. 1, milk chocolate-flavored Chex): If I become president of Chex Choco Land, I will add a richer and smoother milk chocolate flavor to Chex Choco!

(The children cheer.)

Chaka (Candidate No. 2, green onion-flavored Chex): I have been feeling very upset lately. Why? Because Cheki is running in the presidential election of Chex Choco Land! I couldn't just stand by, so I decided to run as well. If I become president, I will put green onions in Chex Choco!

(The children express dislike.)

The original intention was to promote Cheki by making green onion flavor, which children were not expected to like, Chaka's campaign pledge. However, after the event became known on internet communities such as Humorous University and DC Inside, internet users began voting for Chaka as a prank. As of December 11, 2004, Nongshim Kellogg reported that Cheki had received 16,311 votes, while Chaka had received 59,904 votes.

The election event ended on December 31, 2004. Nongshim Kellogg invalidated 47,339 votes—4,620 for Cheki and 42,719 for Chaka—after an internal investigation by CHK Hangang, an information security company, found that 204 internet users had cast fraudulent votes online using macros. The company also added the results of ARS telephone voting and on-site voting at Lotte World. The vote ended with Cheki's victory as follows:

Results of the Chex Choco Land presidential election
Voting location	Cheki	Chaka	Total votes (share of total)
Internet voting (vote share)	29,255 votes (47.74%)	32,030 votes (52.26%)	61,285 votes (74.68%)
ARS telephone voting (vote share)	13,963 votes (80.26%)	3,434 votes (19.74%)	17,397 votes (21.20%)
On-site voting at Lotte World (vote share)	3,206 votes (94.77%)	177 votes (5.23%)	3,383 votes (4.12%)
Total votes (vote share)	46,424 votes (56.57%)	35,641 votes (43.43%)	82,065 votes (100.00%)

Internet users accused Nongshim Kellogg of making Chaka lose through "election manipulation" and attached meme such as "rigged election" and "victory of a Dictatorship" to the vote. Related parodies continued to be uploaded online. In 2018, a petition calling for Cheki's impeachment was posted on the Blue House National Petition, and consumers continued to demand the release of Green Onion Chex online. The incident has also been classified as a representative case of "successful failure" marketing, or noise marketing, in which internet users' prank increased public awareness of a company and its brand.

== Development and promotion ==
External videos
- Kellogg's Chex new product tasting group recruitment video (6s)
- Kellogg's Green Onion Chex "Mian Mianhae" commercial (71s)

In an interview with Money Today, Nongshim Kellogg stated that it had been considering a green onion-flavored cereal since 2004, when the Chex election event was held. According to Kellogg, while developing Green Onion Chex, the company used green onions from Yeoju-grown in order to reproduce a "green onion flavor" that consumers could be satisfied with and enjoy, while also adjusting the strength of the green onion flavor and adding sweetness. The company later decided to release the product in July 2020, taking into account the continued spread of the meme, the popularity of "sweet and salty" flavors, and increased online activity caused by the COVID-19 pandemic

On June 17, 2020, 16 years after the voting event, Nongshim Kellogg announced on its official YouTube channel that Green Onion Chex would be released in July, along with an advertisement recruiting members for a "new Chex product tasting group". Within two days of the announcement, the video had received 140,000 views, and the competition rate for the tasting group reached 200 to 1.

On June 27, an advertisement for Green Onion Chex produced by Directors Company featured trot singer Tae Jin-ah singing a parody version of his song "Mian Mianhae" with lyrics related to Chex. The revised lyrics apologized for releasing Green Onion Chex "too late". The advertisement also used several internet memes, including the coffin dance meme and a "[[GG]]" ("Good Game") declaration at the end of the video using the spelling of Kellogg's.

Production of Green Onion Chex was discontinued in July 2021. In September 2021, a follow-up product, red bean Chex, was released. It used red beans produced in Gochang County, North Jeolla Province, and featured marshmallows resembling saealsim, or small rice cake balls, giving it a flavor and appearance similar to red bean porridge.Kim Young-ok appeared as the advertising model, alongside a foreign Disc jockey parodying the American R&B superduo Silk Sonic. The advertisement used a hip hop-style song, and its slogan was "Do you know K-pat? This is K-pat!"

== Taste and aroma ==
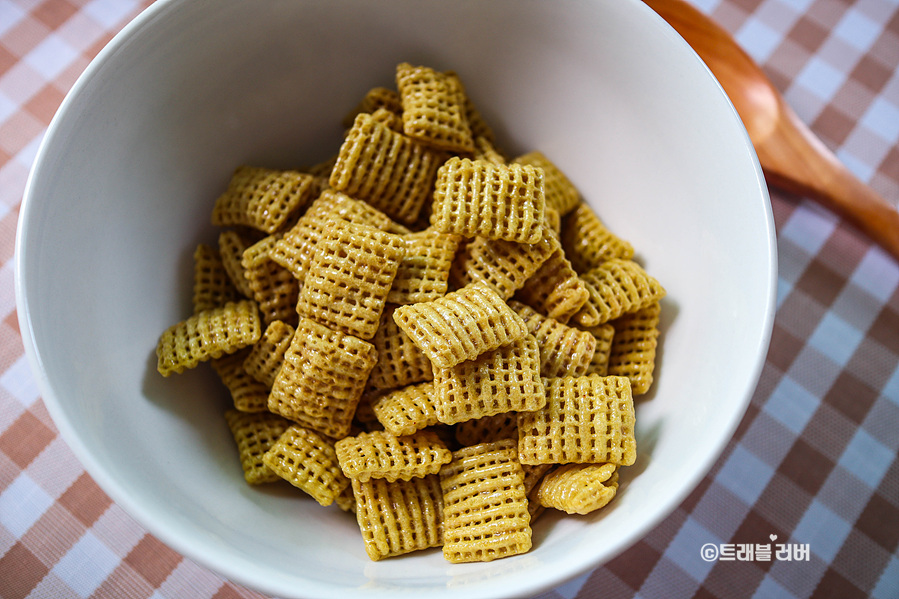
Green Onion Chex served in a bowl

Nongshim Kellogg described the main characteristics of Green Onion Chex as the "green onion flavor" that the company had tried to reproduce from the development stage, as well as a "sweet and salty" taste.

After its release, media outlets and members of the new product tasting group tried Green Onion Chex in various ways. The cereal was eaten not only with milk, but also with soy milk, Achimhaetsal, banana-flavored milk, and other dairy products, as well as with gomtang, seolleongtang, beer, cream soup, ramen, pork cutlet, and tteokbokki. Most members of the tasting group said that Green Onion Chex did not pair well with milk. YouTuberSeungwoo's Dad, who participated in the tasting group, described it as "sticky" and added that it tasted salty when eaten with milk. Kim Sung-yoon, a reporter for ''The Chosun Ilbo'', said that it tasted "like a strongly sweet onion-flavored snack" and "like eating chocolate cereal while chewing green onions", adding that he did not want to eat it with milk.

Another characteristic of Green Onion Chex was its green onion aroma. ''Herald Economy'' reported an incident from Kellogg in which, on days when Green Onion Chex was being produced, the factory that usually smelled of the chocolate aroma of Chex Choco was filled with the smell of green onions. Intern reporters from the ''Seoul Shinmun'' also wrote after trying Green Onion Chex that they commonly noticed a "green onion aroma". Kim Tae-in, an editor at ''The Asia Business Daily'', reviewed the cereal by eating Green Onion Chex and breathing into a breath odor meter, reporting that the result was the same as when the test was performed after eating actual green onions.

== Reception ==
A parody poster distributed at a tasting event for Nongshim Kellogg's limited-edition cereal Green Onion Chex parodied the "Yes We Can" slogan used by former U.S. president Barack Obama during the 2008 United States presidential election.

After Green Onion Chex was released 16 years after the original event, internet users described it as a "victory for democracy". Internet users shared various recipes using Green Onion Chex, including making pajeon with the cereal. 'Money Today'' introduced several online recipes that paired Green Onion Chex with dishes such as naengmyeon and salads.TikToker Yell Unnie and YouTuber Heopop released videos in which they used Green Onion Chex to make pa-kimchi and samgyetang, respectively. In an interview with Newsis, Nongshim Kellogg stated that the product had sold out in online shopping malls within two weeks of its release on July 1. Celebrities including Kim Jae-hwan, Taeyeon, Han Ye-seul, and [[Ham Yon-ji also posted proof shots showing that they had purchased Green Onion Chex.

The marketing strategy for Green Onion Chex received positive reviews from several media outlets. Myung Hee-jin and Kim Hee-ri of the Seoul Shinmun connected the Green Onion Chex craze with the popularity of other internet memes, such as " one Gang a day ", and analyzed it as an expression of a desire to forget social structures that are difficult to overcome "through individual effort alone". Seo Jung-min, a team leader at the JoongAng Ilbo, mainly discussed Green Onion Chex while introducing "doreunja marketing", a term referring to an "insane" marketing strategy that would be impossible to imagine without being "crazy". Moon Soo-jung, a deputy editor at the Kukmin Ilbo, praised the release and marketing of Green Onion Chex, writing, "Why on earth are they doing this? The conclusion is that there is no particular reason. Because it is fun, and because they are curious about other people's reactions." Ra Ye-jin of Ra Ye-jin of The Economist Korea cited Green Onion Chex Green Onion Chex, which was born from the Green Onion Chex rigged election meme, as an example of "B-grade marketing", a marketing style that emphasizes humor. On November 12, 2020, Nongshim Kellogg won the "Best YouTube New Brand Launch" category at the 2020 YouTube Works Awards, hosted by Google, for Green Onion Chex.

== See also ==
- List of Internet phenomena
- Viral marketing
- Jedi census phenomenon – a phenomenon in which some citizens in English-speaking countries reported their religion as Jedi, a fictional religion from the Star Wars franchise, in population censuses in 2001
- Leonard v. Pepsico, Inc. – a case in which PepsiCo in the United States was sued by a college student after a 1996 Pepsi-Cola television commercial appeared to offer a Harrier fighter jet as a prize
