= COSAFA Beach Soccer Championship =

Beach soccer tournament for national teams

- Organiser(s): COSAFA
- Founded: 2015; 11 years ago
- Region: International
- Teams: 8 (as of 2024)
- Current champions: Morocco (1st title)
- Most championships: Madagascar; Morocco; Mozambique; Senegal (1 title each)
- 2024 COSAFA Beach Soccer Championship

The COSAFA Beach Soccer Championship is an international beach soccer competition contested by the national teams of Southern Africa. The competition is organized by the Council of Southern Africa Football Association.

To date, only two COSAFA members have won the title: Madagascar in the inaugural 2015 edition and Mozambique in 2021. Since then, the two most recent editions were won by guest nations, with Senegal in 2022 and Morocco in 2024, the latter being the current champions, having defeated the 2021 winners 4–3 on penalties after a 4–4 draw.

== History ==
As the Seychelles Football Federation was appointed host of the Beach Soccer Africa Cup of Nations in October 2013, and with the aim of developing the sport in the Southern Africa region, COSAFA established the competition in early 2015. It served as a dress rehearsal for the 2015 CAF Beach Soccer Championship, which Seychelles also hosted, while providing competitive exposure for both the hosts and Madagascar. The inaugural edition featured five COSAFA member associations, joined by guest side Al-Ahli from the United Arab Emirates. Madagascar were crowned champions after defeating Malawi 9–4 in the final, and went on to lift the continental title days later.

The tournament then went on hiatus for six years before returning in 2021 in Durban, South Africa, with six teams, five COSAFA members, and East African invited side Tanzania. Mozambique won the title, becoming the second nation to lift the trophy. From that edition, the competition was intended to be held annually and expanded with stronger guest teams to enhance competitiveness. Continental record champions Senegal were invited alongside Egypt for the 2022 edition, with both sides contesting the final. The 2023 edition was rescheduled to 2024, once again in Durban, where the invited side Morocco defeated former champions Mozambique 4–3 on penalties following a 4–4 draw to claim the title. The 2025 edition was initially scheduled for April 2025, before being rescheduled to September of the same year, but was subsequently postponed indefinitely.

In October 2024, the council signed an MoU with Beach Soccer Worldwide (BSWW) to further develop the sport in Southern Africa and create more opportunities in the game.

== Results ==
#	Year	Host city	Final			Third place play-off			No. of teams
#	Year	Host city	Champions	Score	Runners-up	Third place	Score	Fourth place	No. of teams
1	2015; Details	(Seychelles) Roche Caïman	Madagascar	9–4	Malawi	(United Arab Emirates); Al-Ahli	7–3	Mauritius	6
2	2021; Details	(South Africa) Durban	Mozambique	3–1	Tanzania	South Africa / and / Angola			6
3	2022; Details	(South Africa) Durban	Senegal	5–3	Egypt	Uganda	8–7 (a.e.t.)	Mozambique	8
4	2024; Details	(South Africa) Durban	Morocco	4–4 (a.e.t.) (4–3 p)	Mozambique	Malawi	5–4	Saudi Arabia	8

== Awards ==
Year	Top goalscorer(s)	Goals	Best player	Best goalkeeper	Fair play
(Seychelles) 2015					
(South Africa) 2021	(Mozambique) Nélson	6	(Mozambique) Nélson	(Mozambique) Manuel Domingos	not awarded
(South Africa) 2022	(Mozambique) Nélson	13	(Mozambique) Nélson	(Senegal) Seyni Ndiaye	Senegal
(South Africa) 2024	(Malawi) Isaac Kajam (Mozambique) António Namape Jr.	8	(Mozambique) António Namape Jr.	(Morocco) Yassir Abada	Malawi

== Appearances and performance timeline ==
The following is a performance timeline of the teams that have appeared in the COSAFA Beach Soccer Championship and how many appearances they each have made.

Legend

- 1st – Champions
- 2nd – Runners-up
- 3rd – Third place
- 4th – Fourth place
- 5th–16th – Fifth to sixteenth place
- Q – Qualified for upcoming tournament
- × – Did not enter
- •• – Entered but withdrew
- – Hosts
- Apps – No. of appearances

Timeline

Year Team	2015 (Seychelles) (6)	2021 (South Africa) (6)	2022 (South Africa) (8)	2024 (South Africa) (8)	Apps
COSAFA member nations
Angola	×	SF	×	GS	2
Comoros	×	5th	×	×	1
Madagascar	1st	••	×	×	1
Malawi	2nd	×	×	3rd	2
Mauritius	4th	×	GS	×	2
Mozambique	×	1st	4th	2nd	3
Seychelles	5th	6th	GS	GS	4
South Africa	6th	SF	GS	GS	4
Guest nations
Egypt	×	×	2nd	×	1
Morocco	×	×	×	1st	1
Saudi Arabia	×	×	×	4th	1
Senegal	×	×	1st	×	1
Tanzania	×	2nd	GS	GS	3
Uganda	×	×	3rd	×	1

== See also ==
- Africa Beach Soccer Cup of Nations
