= Kat Nestel =

American recording artist and songwriter (born 1990)

Kat
- Born: Katherine Maray Nestel; April 3, 1990 (age 36); Orange County, California, United States
- Genres: Pop, rock
- Occupations: Musician, songwriter
- Instruments: Guitar, vocals
- Years active: 2008–present

Katherine Nestel (born April 3, 1990) is an American recording artist and songwriter from Orange County, California.

== Career ==
Nestel started performing at a young age, and has performed over 300 shows in Southern California since she began playing at the age of 14. Netsel has collaborated with The Dirty Heads and Rome. Recently, Kat made her first national television appearance, when she performed on "Chasing Rainbows" and "Supergirl" on AXS Live.

Kat gained mainstream recognition in 2010 for her brief stint on American Idol. In 2010, Kat sang background vocals on the Dirty Heads song "Lay Me Down" which eventually became a top hit on the Billboard Alternative and All Formats Rock charts.

In June 2013 she signed with management company 1916 MGMT, and soon after she signed a publishing deal with BMG Chrysalis.

As of February 2014, Kat has signed with production team The Monsters and the Strangerz for her artist project. She is currently writing on various Top 40 projects with The Suspex, Jonas Jeberg, Matt Squire, The Stereotypes, Jean Baptiste and more.

In January 2015, she collaborated with Dutch EDM duo Vicetone to provide vocals for the track 'No Way Out' which was released on Spinnin' Records, as well as for 'Nothing Stopping Me' and 'Angels'.
