= Malawi national beach soccer team =

National sports team

Malawi
- Association: Football Association of Malawi
- Confederation: Confederation of African Football
- Head coach: Willy Kumilambe
- Captain: Isaac Kajam
- FIFA code: MWI
- BSWW ranking: 66 ▲1 (6 May 2026)
First colours
Second colours

First international
- Mauritius 3–7 Malawi (Roche Caiman, Seychelles; April 9, 2015)

Biggest win
- Malawi 8–3 Seychelles (Dar es Salaam, Tanzania; November 23, 2018); Seychelles 2–7 Malawi (Durban, South Africa; March 20, 2024)

Biggest defeat
- Madagascar 9–4 Malawi (Roche Caiman, Seychelles; April 11, 2015); Senegal 6–1 Malawi (Hurghada, Egypt; October 21, 2024); Malawi 6–11 Mauritania (Hurghada, Egypt; October 22, 2024)

Beach Soccer Africa Cup of Nations
- Appearances: 2 (first in 2022)
- Best result: Sixth Place (2022)

COSAFA Beach Soccer Championship
- Appearances: 2 (first in 2015)
- Best result: Runners-up (2015)

The Malawi national beach soccer team represents Malawi in international beach soccer and is controlled by the Football Association of Malawi (FAM).

== History ==
Established in 2015, the team made its international debut at the inaugural COSAFA Beach Soccer Championship in Seychelles. It played its first match on 9 April, defeating Mauritius 7–3, before falling to the hosts in extra time in its second outing. The side advanced to the final, where it was defeated by Madagascar to finish as runners-up and claim the silver medal.

The team remained active in regional competition, notably participating in the Copa Dar es Salaam, where it finished runners-up in 2017 before exiting at the group stage in both 2018 and 2019.

In 2022, Malawi entered the qualifiers for the Beach Soccer Africa Cup of Nations for the first time. It defeated Tanzania on the away goals rule (3–2 home win and 5–6 away loss, 8–8 on aggregate) to secure qualification. At the final tournament in Vilankulo, Mozambique, the team placed sixth overall, finishing third in its group before losing on penalties to Uganda in the fifth-place play-off.

The team returned to the international stage at the 2023 COSAFA Beach Soccer Championship, where it secured a third-place finish. It subsequently achieved back-to-back qualification for the 2024 Beach Soccer Africa Cup of Nations after eliminating Burundi in the qualifiers. At the finals, the team finished seventh, losing all group matches before defeating Tanzania in the seventh-place play-off.

In January 2026, the federation announced plans to construct a dedicated beach soccer stadium in Lilongwe as part of efforts to professionalize the sport and support national team preparations for upcoming Africa Cup of Nations qualifiers.

== Technical Panel ==
| Role | Name |
|---|---|
| Head coach | (Malawi) Willy Kumilambe |
| Assistant coach | (Malawi) Edwin Mtachi |
| Analyst | (Malawi) Jayane Jella |
| Goalkeeper coach | (Malawi) Uppe Zalira |
| Team doctor | (Malawi) Dr Calcius Mkandawire |
| Team manager | (Malawi) Andy Khunga |
| Technical director | (Malawi) Patricio Kulemeka |
| Equipment manager | (Malawi) Mike Bwanali |

== Players ==
=== Current squad ===
The following 17 players were called up for the inaugural 2025 CECAFA Beach Soccer Championship, scheduled for July 16–20 in Mombasa, Kenya.

| Pos. | Player | Age | Club |
|---|---|---|---|
| GK | Justin Bonongwe | | (Malawi) Nkhata Bay |
| GK | Mussa Haji | | (Malawi) Nyasa |
| DF | Richard Kambani | | (Malawi) Nyasa |
| DF | Sandram Saddie | | (Malawi) Nkopola |
| DF | Mike Chavula | | (Malawi) Ranki |
| DF | Thomas Sefu | | (Malawi) Deepbay |
| DF | Jowa Sipolo | | (Malawi) Tourism |
| DF | Martin Billiat | | (Malawi) Nkopola |
| DF | Anorld Lastern | | (Malawi) Munali |

| Pos. | Player | Age | Club |
|---|---|---|---|
| MF | Dala Simba | | (Malawi) Vinthenga |
| MF | Isaac Kajamu (C) | | (Malawi) Nkopola |
| MF | Thoko Kamanga | | (Malawi) Beach Eagles |
| MF | Frank Mwenelupembe | | (Malawi) Lake Stars |
| FW | Obrien Nkhumbule | | (Malawi) Beach Eagles |
| FW | Ibrahim Kolex | | (Malawi) Tourism |
| FW | Farook Salika | | (Malawi) Nyasa |
| FW | Allan Mtawali | | (Malawi) Deepbay |

== Competitive record ==
=== FIFA Beach Soccer World Cup ===
FIFA Beach Soccer World Cup record
| Year | Round | Pos. | Pld | W | W+ | WP | L | GF | GA |
|---|---|---|---|---|---|---|---|---|---|
| (Brazil) 2005 | Did not get invited | | | | | | | | |
| (Brazil) 2006 to (Russia) 2021 | Did not enter | | | | | | | | |
| (United Arab Emirates) 2024 | Did not qualify | | | | | | | | |
| (Seychelles) 2025 | Did not qualify | | | | | | | | |
| Total | — | 0/13 | — | — | — | — | — | — | — |

=== Beach Soccer Africa Cup of Nations ===
Beach Soccer Africa Cup of Nations record
| Year | Round | Pos. | Pld | W | W+ | WP | L | GF | GA |
|---|---|---|---|---|---|---|---|---|---|
| (Seychelles) 2015 | Did not enter | | | | | | | | |
| (Nigeria) 2016 | Did not enter | | | | | | | | |
| (Egypt) 2018 | Did not enter | | | | | | | | |
| (Senegal) 2021 | Did not enter | | | | | | | | |
| (Mozambique) 2022 | Sixth place | | 3 | 0 | 0 | 0 | 3 | 11 | 17 |
| (Egypt) 2024 | Seventh place | | 4 | 0 | 1 | 0 | 3 | 16 | 26 |
| Total | Sixth place | 2/6 | 7 | 0 | 1 | 0 | 6 | 27 | 43 |

=== COSAFA Beach Soccer Championship ===
COSAFA Beach Soccer Championship record
| Year | Round | Pos. | Pld | W | W+ | WP | L | GF | GA |
|---|---|---|---|---|---|---|---|---|---|
| (Seychelles) 2015 | Runners-up | | 3 | 1 | 0 | 0 | 2 | 14 | 16 |
| (South Africa) 2021 | Did not enter | | | | | | | | |
| (South Africa) 2022 | Did not enter | | | | | | | | |
| (South Africa) 2024 | Third place | | 5 | 3 | 0 | 0 | 2 | 23 | 22 |
| Total | Runners-up | 2/4 | 8 | 4 | 0 | 0 | 4 | 37 | 38 |

=== Copa Dar es Salaam ===
COSAFA Beach Soccer Championship record
| Year | Round | Pos. | Pld | W | W+ | WP | L | GF | GA |
|---|---|---|---|---|---|---|---|---|---|
| (Tanzania) 2017 | Runners-up | | 4 | 2 | 0 | 0 | 2 | 17 | 18 |
| (Tanzania) 2018 | Fourth place | | 4 | 1 | 0 | 0 | 3 | 27 | 28 |
| (Tanzania) 2019 | Round-robin | 5th | 4 | 0 | 0 | 0 | 4 | 22 | 28 |
| Total | Runners-up | 3/3 | 12 | 3 | 0 | 0 | 9 | 66 | 74 |
