= Aurora (Vicetone EP) =

EP by Vicetone
- Released: April 8, 2016
- Recorded: 2016
- Length: 17:16
- Label: Spinnin' Records
- Producer: Vicetone

Aurora is the debut extended play (EP) by Dutch DJ duo Vicetone. It was released via Spinnin' Records.

== Background ==
Speaking about the EP, Vicetone described it as a project where they "stay true" to their original style while "taking it in new directions". "Siren", a song from the EP features American Idol participant Pia Toscano.

== Track listing ==
No.	Title	Length
1.	"Bright Side" (featuring Cosmos & Creature)	3:23
2.	"Don't You Run" (featuring Raja Kumari)	3:15
3.	"Siren" (featuring Pia Toscano)	3:19
4.	"The Otherside"	3:28
5.	"Green Eyes"	3:53
Total length:		17:16

== Charts ==
Chart (2016)	Peak position
US Top Dance/Electronic Albums (Billboard)	21
