= 2023 COSAFA Beach Soccer Championship =

4th COSAFA Beach Soccer Championship

Tournament details
- Host country: South Africa
- City: Durban
- Dates: 17–23 March 2024
- Teams: 8 (from 2 confederations)
- Venue: 1 (in 1 host city)

Final positions
- Champions: Morocco (1st title)
- Runners-up: Mozambique
- Third place: Malawi
- Fourth place: Saudi Arabia

Tournament statistics
- Matches played: 16
- Goals scored: 116 (7.25 per match)
- Top scorer(s): (Malawi) Isaac Kajam (Mozambique) António Namape Jr. (8 goals each)
- Best player: (Mozambique) António Namape Jr.
- Best goalkeeper: (Morocco) Yassir Abada
- Fair play award: Malawi

The 2023 COSAFA Beach Soccer Championship was the fourth edition of the annual tournament organized by COSAFA. The tournament was held in Durban, South Africa.

Senegal are defending champions. Morocco beat Mozambique 4-3 via penalties in the final after the final match ended in a 4-4 draw.

== Venues ==
This edition of the tournament was held at South Beach, Durban in South Africa.

== Draw ==
The draw for this edition of the tournament was held on 7 March 2024 at 11h00 CAT. The eight teams were drawn into 2 group of 4 teams with teams finishing first and second in the groups qualifying for the knockout stages.

The draw resulted in the following groups:

Group A
Pos	Team
A1	South Africa
A2	Saudi Arabia
A3	Seychelles
A4	Malawi

Group B
Pos	Team
B1	Morocco
B2	Mozambique
B3	Tanzania
B4	Angola

== Match officials ==
The following referees were appointed by COSAFA to officiate the competition:

Referee	Qualified
(Madagascar) Said Hachim	2010
(Madagascar) Tsaralaza Maolidy	2013
(Malawi) Rose Zimba	2019
(Mauritius) Reetesh Loll	2016
(Mauritius) Louis Siave	2016

Referee	Qualified
(Mozambique) Dique Muxanga	2022
(Mozambique) Ângelo Nguenha	2022
(Seychelles) Nadim Lucas	2024
(Seychelles) Dean Vandertoorn	2024
(South Africa) Malusi Mbatha	2023
(Tanzania) Jackson Msilombo	2018

== Group stage ==
=== Group A ===
Pos	Team	Pld	W	W+	WP	L	GF	GA	GD	Pts	Qualification
1	Saudi Arabia	3	2	0	0	1	9	5	+4	6	Knockout stage
2	Malawi	3	2	0	0	1	12	9	+3	6	Knockout stage
3	South Africa (H)	3	1	0	0	2	6	9	−3	3	
4	Seychelles	3	1	0	0	2	7	11	−4	3	

Source: COSAFA
Rules for classification: Tiebreakers
(H) Host
17 March 2024
12:00

South Africa	2–4	Malawi
Phiwokuhle Gumede 13'; Sandram Ussi 15' (o.g.)	Report	Dala Simba Dala 8'; Isaac Kajam 16', 26'; Sandram Ussi 28'

South Beach Arena, Durban
Referee: Dique Muxanga (Mozambique)
Reetesh Loll (Mauritius)
17 March 2024
14:30

Saudi Arabia	1–3	Seychelles
Ramzi Dakman 24'	Report	Stephen Lajoie 11'; Terrence Amade 21'; Martin Williams 32'

South Beach Arena, Durban
Referee: Dique Muxanga (Mozambique)
Reetesh Loll (Mauritius)

18 March 2024
12:00

South Africa	3–2	Seychelles
Ntuthuko Mbutho 22'; Siyabonga Mkhize 30'; Abongile Gcuda 30'	Report	Stephen Lajoie 10'; Medrick Jean-Baptiste 26'

South Beach Arena, Durban
Referee: Angelo Nguenha (Mozambique)
Dique Muxanga (Mozambique)
18 March 2024
16:00

Malawi	1–5	Saudi Arabia
Sandram Ussi 15'	Report	Ramzi Dakman 17', 17', 23'; Mubarak Al-Duoasri 21'; Ahmed Al-Hamami 26'

South Beach Arena, Durban
Referee: Steven Siave (Mauritius)
Dean Vandertoorn (Seychelles)

20 March 2024
10:30

Seychelles	2–7	Malawi
Ryan Servina 15', 32'	Report	Isaac Kajam 13', 14'; Dala Simba Dala 15'; Arnold Lasten 23'; Thoko Kamanga 29'; Sandram Ussi 34'; Martin Biliati 36'

South Beach Arena, Durban
Referee: Tsaralaza Maolidy (Madagascar)
Malusi Mbatha (South Africa)
20 March 2024
14:30

South Africa	1–3	Saudi Arabia
Sphephelo Cele 14'	Report	Mubarak Al-Douasri 10'; Ramzi Dakman 12', 18'

South Beach Arena, Durban
Referee: Said Hachim (Madagascar)
Reetesh Loll (Mauritius)

=== Group B ===
Pos	Team	Pld	W	W+	WP	L	GF	GA	GD	Pts	Qualification
1	Morocco	3	2	0	0	1	9	6	+3	6	Knockout stage
2	Mozambique	3	2	0	0	1	15	13	+2	6	Knockout stage
3	Angola	3	1	1	0	1	10	12	−2	5	
4	Tanzania	3	0	0	0	3	7	10	−3	0	

Source: COSAFA
Rules for classification: Tiebreakers
17 March 2024
10:30

Tanzania	2–3 (a.e.t.)	Angola
Jaruph Juma 14'; Goodluck Gama 17'	Report	Paulo do Amaral 16', 39'; Omar da Fonseca 21'

South Beach Arena, Durban
Referee: Jackson Msilombo (Tanzania)
Lucas Nadim (Seychelles)
17 March 2024
16:00

Morocco	5–2	Mozambique
Driss Ghannam 2', 26'; Reda Zahraoui 5', 33'; Badr El Kraichly 10'	Report	António Namape Jr. 13'; João Couna 25'

South Beach Arena, Durban
Referee: Steven Siave (Mauritius)
Tsaralaza Maolidy (Madagascar)

18 March 2024
10:30

Mozambique	5–4	Tanzania
Rachide Simithe 5'; Paulo Novela 11'; António Namape Jr. 13', 22'; Ângelo Tomas 20'	Report	Abdulrahim Bausi 7', 31'; Jaruph Juma 16', 33'

South Beach Arena, Durban
Referee: Said Hachim (Madagascar)
Tsaralaza Maolidy (Madagascar)
18 March 2024
14:30

Morocco	2–3	Angola
Reda Zahraoui 7'; Driss Ghannam 35'	Report	Pascoal Tchitungo 24', 33'; Wilson Francisci 34'

South Beach Arena, Durban
Referee: Reetesh Loll (Mauritius)
Jackson Msilombo (Tanzania)

20 March 2024
12:00

Angola	4–8	Mozambique
Omar da Fonseca 5'; Paulo do Amaral 11'; Eurípedes Francisco 18'; Mateus António 27'	Report	Rachide Simithe 9'; António Namape Jr. 13', 27'; Júlio Manjate 16'; Paulo Novela 17', 26'; Ângelo Tomas 19'; Ramossete Cumbe 35'

South Beach Arena, Durban
Referee: Steven Siave (Mauritius)
Jackson Msilombo (Tanzania)
20 March 2024
16:00

Morocco	2–1	Tanzania
Amine El Bidouri 6', 19'	Report	Jaruph Juma 3'

South Beach Arena, Durban
Referee: Dique Muxanga (Mozambique)
Rose Zimba (Malawi)

== Knockout stage ==
- In the knockout stage, extra-time and a penalty shoot-out will be used to decide the winner if necessary.

=== Bracket ===
Semi-finals
21 March – Durban
Morocco	9
Malawi	6
21 March – Durban
Saudi Arabia	1
Mozambique	8

Final
23 March – Durban
Morocco (p)	4 (4)
Mozambique	4 (3)
Third Place match
23 March – Durban
Malawi	5
Saudi Arabia	4

==== Semi-Finals ====
21 March 2024
14:00

Morocco	9–6	Malawi
Reda Zahraoui 6', 18'; Driss Ghannam 14', 25'; Adnan Oubahri 16', 29', 30', 36'; Martin Biliati 33' (o.g.)	Report	Dala Simba Dala 2'; Oblen Khumbula 2'; Isaac Kajam 8', 33'; Sandram Ussi 13'; Yassir Abada 29' (o.g.)

South Beach Arena, Durban
Referee: Reetesh Loll (Mauritius)
Malusi Mbatha (South Africa)

21 March 2024
15:30

Saudi Arabia	1–8	Mozambique
Naif Yakl 18' (pen.)	Report	Rachide Simithe 8', 16'; António Namape Jr. 10', 13'; Hélio Mahota 12', 14', 25'; Yuran Malate 34'

South Beach Arena, Durban
Referee: Jackson Msilombo (Tanzania)
Lucas Nadim (Seychelles)

==== Third-place ====
23 March 2024
14:00

Malawi	5–4	Saudi Arabia
Isaac Kajam 11', 18'; Oblen Khumbula 15', 31'; Dala Simba Dala 32'	Report	Khaled Al Mowallad 17', 25'; Eslam Sarraj 19', 28'

South Beach Arena, Durban

==== Final ====
23 March 2024
15:30

Morocco	4–4 (a.e.t.)	Mozambique
Zouhair Jabbary 16'; Adnan Oubahri 19'; Badr El Kraichly 21'; Yassir Abada 36'	Report	Rachide Simithe 4'; Ângelo Tomas 9', 29'; António Namape Jr. 22'
Penalties
Reda Zahraoui (penalty scored); Badr El Kraichly (penalty missed); Driss Ghannam (penalty scored); Anouar El Abassi (penalty scored); Amine El Bidouri (penalty scored)	4–3	(penalty scored) António Namape Jr.; (penalty scored) Yuran Malate; (penalty missed) Hélder Mahumane; (penalty scored) Rachide Simithe; (penalty missed) Ramossete Cumbe

South Beach Arena, Durban
Referee: Steven Siave (Mauritius)
Tsaralaza Maolidy (Madagascar)

== Awards ==
The following awards were given at the conclusion of the tournament: the Golden Boot (top scorer), Golden Ball (best overall player) and Golden Glove (best goalkeeper).

Golden Boot
(Malawi) Isaac Kajam and (Mozambique) Antonio Namape Jnr
8 goals
Golden Ball
(Mozambique) Antonio Namape Jnr
Golden Glove
(Morocco) Yassir Abada
COSAFA Beach Soccer Fair Play Trophy
Malawi

== Goalscorers ==
There were 116 goals scored in 16 matches, for an average of 7.25 goals per match.

8 goals

- (Malawi) Isaac Kajam
- (Mozambique) António Namape Jr.

6 goals

- (Saudi Arabia) Ramzi Dakman

5 goals

- (Morocco) Driss Ghannam
- (Morocco) Adnan Oubahri
- (Morocco) Reda Zahraoui
- (Mozambique) Rachide Simithe

4 goals

- (Malawi) Dala Simba Dala
- (Malawi) Sandram Ussi
- (Mozambique) Ângelo Tomas
- (Tanzania) Jaruph Juma

3 goals

- (Angola) Paulo do Amaral
- (Malawi) Oblen Khumbula
- (Mozambique) Hélio Mahota
- (Mozambique) Paulo Novela

2 goals

- (Angola) Omar da Fonseca
- (Angola) Pascoal Tchitungo
- (Morocco) Amine El Bidouri
- (Morocco) Badr El Kraichly
- (Saudi Arabia) Mubarak Al-Duoasri
- (Saudi Arabia) Khaled Al Mowallad
- (Saudi Arabia) Eslam Sarraj
- (Seychelles) Stephen Lajoie
- (Seychelles) Ryan Servina
- (Tanzania) Abdulrahim Bausi

1 goal

- (Angola) Mateus António
- (Angola) Wilson Francisci
- (Angola) Eurípedes Francisco
- (Malawi) Martin Biliati
- (Malawi) Thoko Kamanga
- (Malawi) Arnold Lasten
- (Morocco) Yassir Abada
- (Morocco) Zouhair Jabbary
- (Mozambique) João Couna
- (Mozambique) Ramossete Cumbe
- (Mozambique) Yuran Malate
- (Mozambique) Júlio Manjate
- (Saudi Arabia) Ahmed Al-Hamami
- (Saudi Arabia) Naif Yakl
- (Seychelles) Terrence Amade
- (Seychelles) Medrick Jean-Baptiste
- (Seychelles) Martin Williams
- (South Africa) Sphephelo Cele
- (South Africa) Abongile Gcuda
- (South Africa) Phiwokuhle Gumede
- (South Africa) Ntuthuko Mbutho
- (South Africa) Siyabonga Mkhize
- (Tanzania) Goodluck Gama

1 own goal

- (Malawi) Martin Biliati (vs. Morocco)
- (Malawi) Sandram Ussi (vs. South Africa)
- (Morocco) Yassir Abada (vs. Malawi)
