= Pallbearer =

Person who carries a casket at a funeral

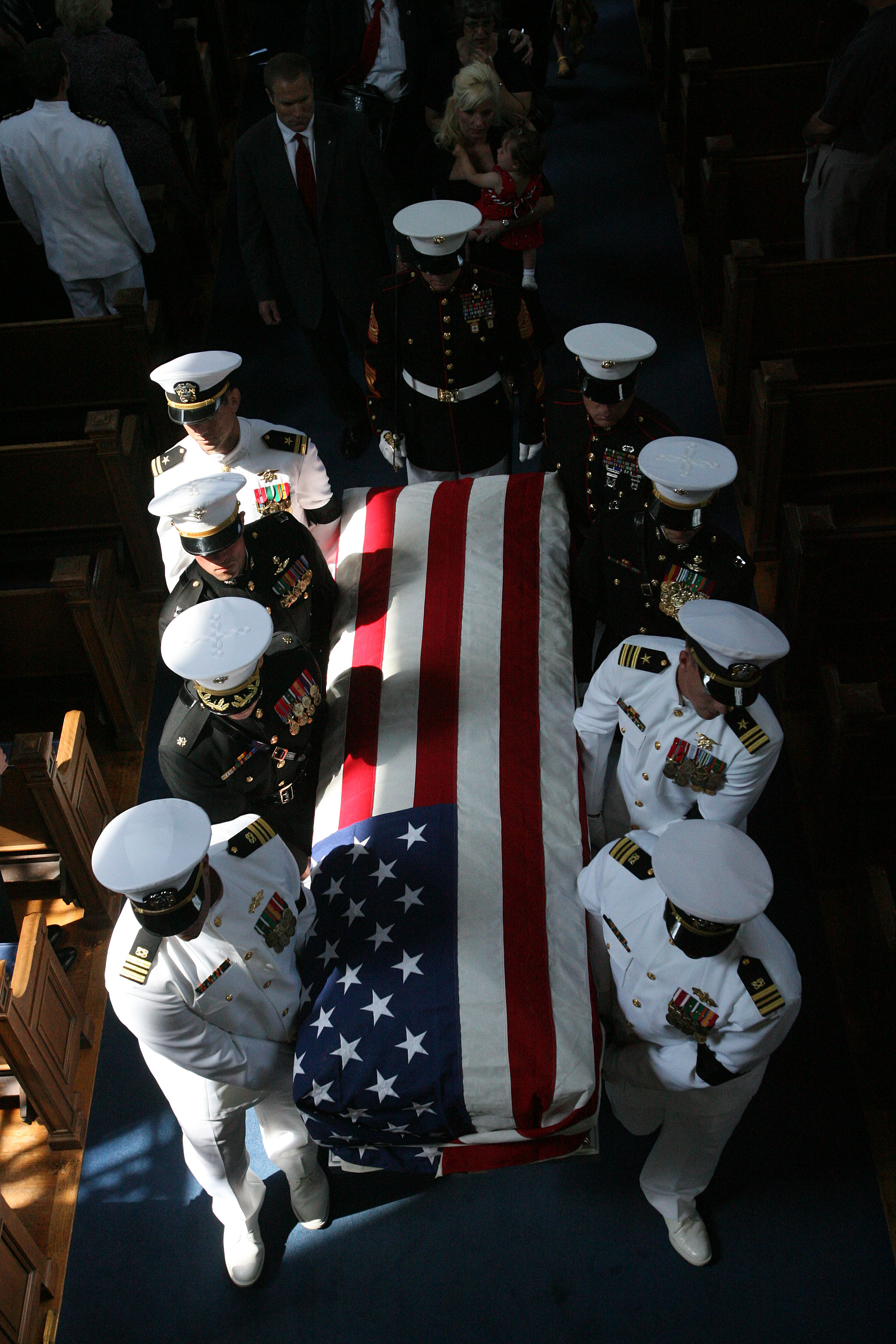
Pallbearers carrying the casket of Major Douglas A. Zembiec of the United States Marine Corps

A pallbearer is one of several participants who help carry the casket at a funeral. They may wear white gloves in order to prevent damaging the casket and to show respect to the deceased person.

Some traditions distinguish between the roles of pallbearers and casket bearer. The former is a ceremonial position, carrying a tip of the pall or a cord attached to it. The latter do the actual heavy lifting and carrying. There may otherwise be pallbearers only in the symbolic sense if the casket is on an animal or vehicle.

In Western cultures, the pallbearers are usually male family members, close friends, or colleagues of the deceased. A notable exception was the funeral of Lee Harvey Oswald in which reporters outnumbered mourners and were pressed into service to carry the coffin. In some African cultures, pallbearers are not family members but are staff of professional funeral agencies who are paid for their services.

Depending on local tradition, pallbearers carry the coffin either on their shoulders or by using handles at waist level. At times additional pallbearers, known as honorary pallbearers, walk either behind or directly in front of the casket in a showcase of supplemental distinction towards the deceased. This type of pallbearer is most often a gentleman in the profession of the deceased who has achieved significant merit within their position.

Pallbearers additionally carry an urn ark, a wooden box with glass that carries an urn with four handles during a memorial service or celebration of life.

== Etymology ==
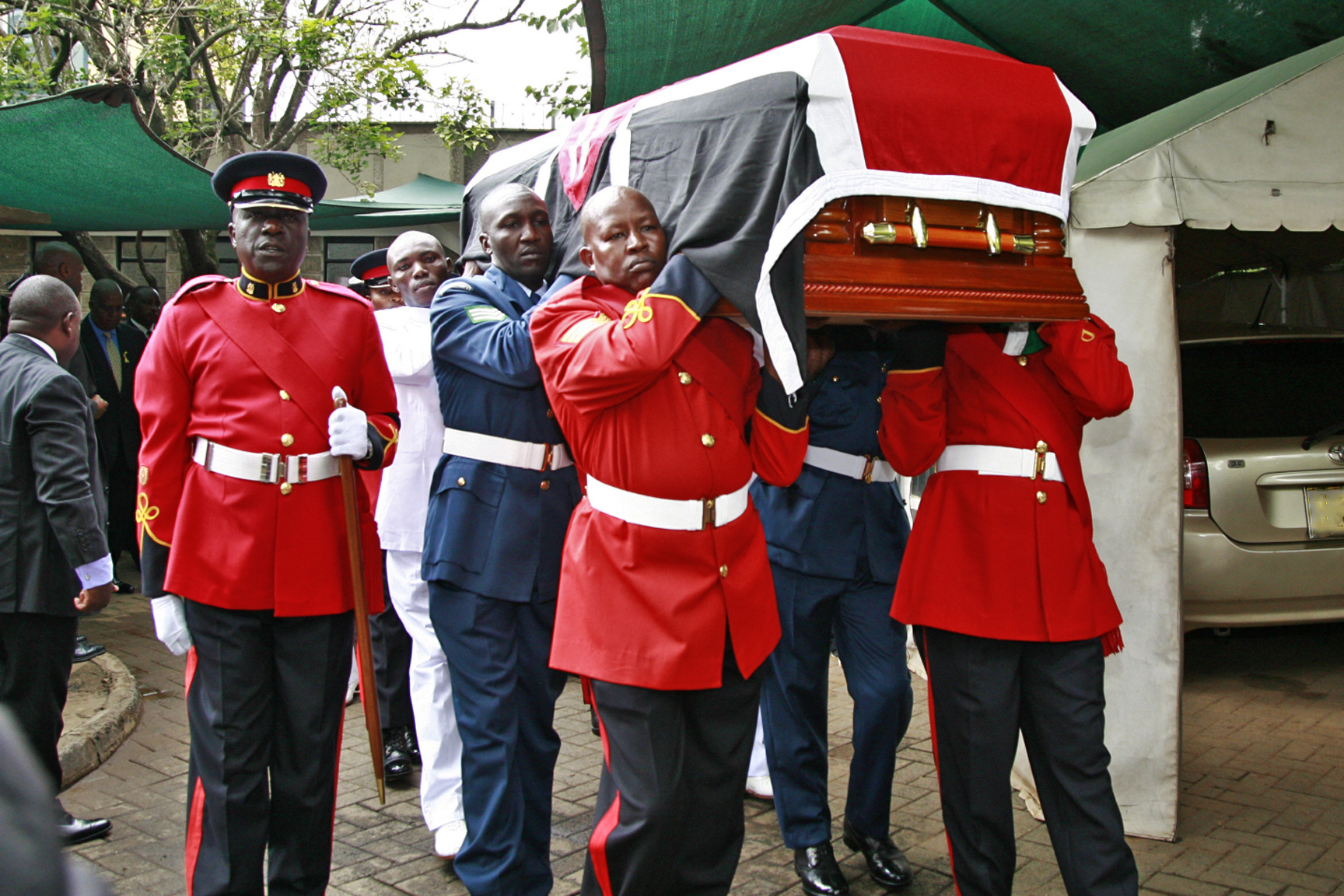
Pallbearers at a dignitary's burial in Kenya

A pall is a heavy cloth that is draped over a coffin. Thus the term pallbearer is used to signify someone who "bears" the coffin which the pall covers. In the Holy Roman Empire, a soldier wore a cape or cloak called the pallium. In medieval times the term pallium was shortened to pall. Christians would use a pall to cover their loved ones when burying them.

== Buddhist culture ==
In Ancient Indian Buddhist cultural traditions of grieving, often requires pallbearers to consume a vegetarian diet which excludes garlic, onions, leek and chives. They tend to also abstain from alcohol for at least 49 days after passing. This is thought to be the maximum duration likely between death and rebirth. Hence, acts might be performed frequently during this duration in order to produce merit for the dead. Thus, this leads up to the ‘ending’ ritual on the last day. In every tradition of Buddhism, there is a spiritualist who communicates with the dead at the request of the pallbearer. Usually, the primary reason is to make sure that there has been sufficient merit produced by the deceased's family to prevent an unwanted rebirth.

== British culture ==
The arrangement for Princess Louisa's funeral during 1768, held the first announcement that women were to be utilised as contributors of the pall at the funeral. Garter King of Arms then promptly notified the Lord Chamberlain that ladies had only gone into a funeral process by mourning or attendants under the chief mourners. To hold the ends of the pall draped over casket or to transport the coffin was a tremendous honour. The ability of pallbearers to come towards royalty which only few were allowed to, be it whether the King is alive or dead.

== Method of carrying ==
Pallbearers in the US, Canada and Australia most commonly carry a casket by the handles, and at around waist height. In the United Kingdom, Ireland, and most countries in Asia, the coffin is often carried on the shoulders. There are typically 6 to 8 pallbearers depending on the size and weight of the coffin.

In Scandinavia, the casket is carried by three straps, which go under the casket; the pallbearers on each side take their side of the strap over their shoulders and the casket itself is suspended by the straps on knee height. The advantage of this method is that the weight of the casket is distributed on the shoulders of the pallbearers, and the casket can be lowered immediately to the grave, as the pallbearers will simply walk lengthwise on each side of the grave. Once the casket has been lowered, the pallbearers on the right side of the casket (the heart of the deceased) then pull the straps off.

== British countryside and carriages ==
Further, chief mourners and attendants such as pallbearers and canopy usually wore mourning gowns with hoods. The act of putting on of particular mourning clothing, along with offering food, and burial banquet were ancient practices preserved by European Renaissance burial traditions that lasted till the 19th century. Another way to indulge in funeral ceremonies included objects such as golden palls, royal horses, and expensive wax tapers. The funeral van with the coffin-bearers holding the corners of the pall follows, with the pallbearers beneath the pall actually supporting the casket. In the 19th century, white was worn in the British countryside for mourning. For example, the village of Piddington had a set of similar white gowns for pallbearers which remained in the church. If a funeral occurs, pallbearers could come from the fields and swap them with their work clothes. Carriages were built specially made for pallbearers so that 6 people can proceed comfortably or two closed carriages would be used. The 2 leading pallbearers, funeral director and clergyman, would be in the first carriage. The rest of the pallbearers would take the second carriage. Honorary pallbearers are arranged in a similar manner following the active pallbearers. Pallbearers’ carriages would leave a specific place at a certain time in case those who wish to ride to the church or house could meet at that area.

== Death in a fraternity or other societies ==
If the dead was a member of a fraternity or other societies, the family could likely select that entire group. At Masonic funerals, pallbearers are usually selected from that order. If there are more than one organisation, it is possible that some would be chosen from each of these societies. The leaders of each society should be informed of the plan, in order to properly appoint their members. There is a tradition in some places where trained pallbearers were chosen by funeral directors. When this happens, pallbearers acknowledge their duties and position, and are not required to go into details on the subject during that time. If the church path is narrow and the turns are sharp which may be hard to go past with pallbearers, a coffin carriage might be used. Otherwise the coffin can be lifted to the altar and placed down by the pallbearers. Unless the state of the street is that the coffin cannot be removed from the hearse standing near the curbing, it would not be backed up at either the church or house. Allocated seating for the pallbearers is usually at the left front pews, once the coffin is placed then pallbearers may sit, and funeral director sits directly behind the coffin. Thus, this shows how societies are impacted by a death of a member and how pallbearers function in short turns.

== See also ==
- Cemetery
- Cremation
- Crematorium
- Dancing Pallbearers
- Funeral director
- Funeral home
- Mausoleum
- Urn
