= A Week Away (TV series) =

2025 television series

- Genre: Musical; Teen drama; Romance
- Developed by: Alan Powell
- Showrunner: Alan Powell
- Starring: Antonio Cipriano; Cozi Zuehlsdorff; Leigh-Allyn Baker; Sacha Carlson; Ava Jean; Jason Marsden; Haven Greene; Luke Concepcion; Carlos PenaVega; David Koechner
- Opening theme: "Made For This" by Antonio Cipriano, Sacha Carlson, Ava Jean & Cozi Zuehlsdorff
- Country of origin: United States
- Original language: English
- No. of seasons: 1
- No. of episodes: 7

Production
- Executive producers: Alan Powell; Kali Bailey; Cozi Zuehlsdorff
- Production location: Tennessee
- Running time: 22–38 minutes
- Production companies: Monarch Media; Angel Studios

Original release
- Network: Angel Studios
- Release: August 28 – October 1, 2025

A Week Away, also known as A Week Away: The Series, is a Christian American musical television series created for Angel Studios by Alan Powell. It is a spin-off series based on the Netflix film A Week Away (2021). The series premiered on August 28, 2025.

== Premise ==
The series follows Max, a defiant teenager from a foster home, as he along with his brother Charlie and other foster teens are sent to Christian camp Aweegaway. At the camp they're guided by longtime campers Lennie, Jake and Savannah, and navigate faith, friendship and personal healing.

== Cast ==
=== Starring ===
- Antonio Cipriano as Max, Charlie's biological older brother
- Cozi Zuehlsdorff as Lennie
- Leigh-Allyn Baker as Karla, Savannah's mother and the daughter of the founder of the camp
- Sacha Carlson as Jake
- Ava Jean as Savannah, Karla's daughter
- Jason Marsden as Bog, the camp's security guard
- Haven Greene as Rowe
- Luke Concepcion as Charlie, Max's biological younger brother
- Carlos PenaVega as Jeremy, the Pastor at Camp (Note: Credited as a special guest star.)
- David Koechner as David

=== Recurring ===
- Dyson Campbell as Twin #1
- Cayden Campbell as Twin #2
- AJ Powell as Hazel Mae
- Abram Joshua Francisco as Timmy

=== Guest ===
- Steven Curtis Chapman as Lifeguard Steve
- Alexa PenaVega as Nurse

== Production ==
The series is based on the 2021 musical film A Week Away, which was co-written by the series' creator, Alan Powell. Powell developed the television adaptation with returning collaborators from the film, including writer Kali Bailey and songwriter/producer Adam Watts, who again contributed to the series' music. The project was developed by Monarch Media in partnership with Angel Studios.

Prior to the series being greenlit, the filmmakers produced a proof-of-concept called "The Torch" in 2023, which is a short prototype video for Angel Studios to demonstrate the tone, pacing, and storytelling of a project and are presented to members of the Angel Guild, who vote on whether the studio should move forward with production. In The Torch, the lead role of Max was portrayed by Matte Martinez, and the character was initially written with a darker and moodier tone to match his interpretation. Martinez later became unavailable after being cast to portray Michael Jackson in MJ the Musical. Following development, Antonio Cipriano was cast as Max in the series, starring alongside Cozi Zuehlsdorff.

Filming for the series began in spring 2025 in Tennessee. It took place at Camp Widjiwagan in Nashville, the same location used for the 2021 film.

== Episodes ==
No.	Title	Directed by	Written by	Original release date
1	"Welcome, Orphans"	Kali Bailey & Alan Powell	Kali Bailey, Alan Powell & Cozi Zuehlsdorff	August 28, 2025
2	"Why Am I Here?"	Alan Powell	Kali Bailey, Alan Powell & Cozi Zuehlsdorff	August 28, 2025
3	"Charlie Turns Green"	Alan Powell	Kali Bailey, Alan Powell & Cozi Zuehlsdorff	September 3, 2025
4	"It Is Well"	Alan Powell	Kali Bailey, Alan Powell & Cozi Zuehlsdorff	September 10, 2025
5	"Never Be The Same"	Alan Powell	Kali Bailey, Alan Powell & Cozi Zuehlsdorff	September 18, 2025
6	"The Prodigal Son"	Kali Bailey & Alan Powell	Kali Bailey, Alan Powell & Cozi Zuehlsdorff	September 25, 2025
7	"Made For This"	Alan Powell	Kali Bailey, Alan Powell & Cozi Zuehlsdorff	October 1, 2025

== Soundtrack ==
=== Track listing ===
#	Title	Writer(s)	Performer(s)	Length
1	"You Will See"	Adam Watts, Cozi Zuehlsdorff & Alan Powell	Antonio Cipriano, Cozi Zuehlsdorff, Sacha Carlson & Cast of A Week Away: The Series	3:13
2	"Amazing Grace (How Silent the Sound)"	Alan Powell, Adam Watts, John Newton	Antonio Cipriano	3:09
3	"That's What I'm Here For"	Adam Watts, Cozi Zuehlsdorff & Alan Powell	Antonio Cipriano, Sacha Carlson, Blake Rhodes, Luke Concepcion, Kittrell Poe, Bailey Munoz, Ava Jean, Cozi Zuehlsdorff & Ryan Maw	2:30
4	"Something in the Air"	Adam Watts, Cozi Zuehlsdorff & Alan Powell	Cozi Zuehlsdorff	3:10
5	"Style V. Substance"	Adam Watts, Cozi Zuehlsdorff & Alan Powell	Haven Greene, Cozi Zuehlsdorff	3:45
6	"Camp Crush"	Adam Watts, Cozi Zuehlsdorff & Alan Powell	Antonio Cipriano, Haven Greene, Sacha Carlson, Luke Concepcion, Ava Jean, Cozi Zuehlsdorff & Cast of A Week Away: The Series	3:13
7	"Never Be The Same"	Adam Watts, Cozi Zuehlsdorff & Alan Powell	Antonio Cipriano, Cozi Zuehlsdorff	4:23
8	"The Hell of It / It is Well With My Soul"	Horatio Gates Spafford, Cozi Zuehlsdorff, Philip Paul Bliss	Carlos PenaVega, Antonio Cipriano, Sacha Carlson, Ava Jean, Cozi Zuehlsdorff	5:46
9	"Everybody’s Got a Story"	Adam Watts, Cozi Zuehlsdorff, Alan Powell	AJ Powell, Emma Mather, Sophie Pittman, Blake Rhodes, Kittrell Poe, Trinity Inay, Dyson Campbell, Kenzie Robertson, Bailey Munoz, Nikki Mele, Tiffany Robinson, Isabella Lopez, Ryan Maw & Cayden Campbell	3:28
10	"Jesus Freak"	Mark Heimermann, TobyMac	Sacha Carlson	5:14
11	"You Say"	Adam Watts, Cozi Zuehlsdorff & Alan Powell	Antonio Cipriano, Cozi Zuehlsdorff	3:23
12	"Birthday Card"	Cozi Zuehlsdorff	Ava Jean	2:51
13	"Made For This"	Adam Watts, Cozi Zuehlsdorff & Alan Powell	Antonio Cipriano, Sacha Carlson, Ava Jean, Cozi Zuehlsdorff	2:49
14	"Unforgettable Memories"	Adam Watts, Cozi Zuehlsdorff & Alan Powell	Antonio Cipriano, Sacha Carlson, Ava Jean, Cozi Zuehlsdorff	3:08
15	"The Hell of It"	Cozi Zuehlsdorff	Antonio Cipriano, Cozi Zuehlsdorff	4:02
