= Nevada (Vicetone song) =

2016 single by Vicetone featuring Cozi Zuehlsdorff

Single by Vicetone featuring Cozi Zuehlsdorff

from the album Monstercat 028 - Uproar
- Released: June 20, 2016
- Label: Monstercat
- Songwriters: Vicetone; Cozi Zuehlsdorff
- Producer: Vicetone

Vicetone singles chronology
"Hawt Stuff" (2016)	"Nevada" (2016)	"Anywhere I Go" (2016)

Music video
- "Nevada" on YouTube

"Nevada" is a song by the Dutch DJ duo Vicetone featuring American actress and singer Cozi Zuehlsdorff, released as a single on 20 June 2016 through Monstercat.

== Background ==
"While the first melody and chords for this song were created in about 20 minutes, it took about two years to finally complete. The idea came to me when I was stranded in Toronto; Vicetone was having trouble traveling and had to stay in Canada for a day. While we were in the hotel, I started on my first idea of using guitar chords in a dance song. When we finally got home, we spent a lot of time trying to make the rock sound better. When we finished the song and sent it to the label, it did not have vocals, but Monstercat loved it and wanted to release it. They suggested that Cozi sing it. I sent the song to Cozi and about a week or two later she sent the first vocal demo."

== Reception ==
Billboard says of the song: "Initially the duo surrounds Cozi Zuehlsdorff's voice with pleasing sounds – warm, gurgling synths – but the hook sweeps in with gnarled metallic force, adding a shade of menace to the singer's warning".

== Certifications ==
Certifications for "Nevada"
Region	Certification	Certified units/sales
Canada (Music Canada)	Gold	40,000^{‡}
New Zealand (RMNZ)	Gold	15,000^{‡}
United States (RIAA)	Gold	500,000^{‡}
^{‡} Sales+streaming figures based on certification alone.
