= Cozi Zuehlsdorff =

American actress and singer (born 1998)

- Born: Cozi Noelle Zuehlsdorff; August 3, 1998 (age 28); Mission Viejo, California, U.S.
- Occupations: Actress; producer; singer; songwriter; writer
- Years active: 2011–present
- Label: Monstercat

Cozi Noelle Zuehlsdorff (born August 3, 1998) is an American actress, producer, singer, songwriter and writer, best known for her role as Hazel Haskett in the movie Dolphin Tale (2011) and the sequel, Dolphin Tale 2 (2014). She appeared in Mighty Med as Jordan, in Liv and Maddie as Ocean, and the 2018 musical remake of Freaky Friday as Ellie.

In November 2014, she released her debut EP, Originals. Zuehlsdorff has notably collaborated with Swedish artists Hellberg and Rich Edwards alongside Dutch DJ duo Vicetone with the singles "The Girl", "Where I'll Be Waiting" and "Nevada" respectively. All three of these songs in which she provided vocals to were released on the Canadian EDM label Monstercat between 2015 and 2016.

== Early life ==
Zuehlsdorff was born Cozi Noelle Zuehlsdorff on August 3, 1998 in Mission Viejo, California to Allison (née Beech) and Scott Zuehlsdorff. She has one sister.

== Career ==
=== Acting career ===
Zuehlsdorff began acting in musicals at a young age. Her first major role was Hazel in the 2011 film Dolphin Tale. She then appeared in Disney Channel's Liv and Maddie and in Disney XD's Mighty Med prior to reprising her role of Hazel in Dolphin Tale 2. She starred in the 2018 TV film Freaky Friday.

=== Musical career ===
Zuehlsdorff is also a singer-songwriter. She wrote and performed the song "Brave Souls" for Dolphin Tale 2. She released her debut independent EP Originals on November 27, 2014. Zuehlsdorff has also been a featuring artist on Hellberg's song "The Girl", released March 16, 2015 and several more on Monstercat. She is also featured on Vicetone's song "Nevada", released in 2016, which achieved Gold certification in the United States and Canada and became one of her most commercially successful and widely recognized collaborations.

== Discography ==
=== Extended plays (EP) ===
- Originals (2014)
- Angel Food, Vol. 1 (2024)
- Angel Food, Vol. 2 (2024)

=== Singles ===
==== As lead artist ====
Title	Year	Album
"Brave Souls"	2014	Non-album single
"Handpainted" (Brennley's Song)	2015	Non-album single
"Beat Drops"	2018	Non-album single
"It's a Wonderful Life"	2018	Non-album single
"The Old Me & You" (feat. Andrew Barth Feldman)	2021	Non-album single
"Boy In My Head"	2022	Non-album single
"Tattoo Removed"	2022	Non-album single
"Done This Before"	2023	Non-album single
"All About Me"	2023	Non-album single
"Lead Poisoning"	2023	Non-album single
"Macbeth"	2023	Non-album single
"River"	2023	Non-album single
"Who's Your Friend"	2024	Non-album single
"Time Machine"	2024	Non-album single
"See Through"	2024	Angel Food, Vol. 1
"For You/About You"	2024	Angel Food, Vol. 1
"Angel Food"	2024	Angel Food, Vol. 1
"Gut Feeling"	2024	Angel Food, Vol. 1
"Paciencia Y Fe"	2024	Angel Food, Vol. 1
"Autopsy"	2024	Angel Food, Vol. 2
"End of the World"	2024	Angel Food, Vol. 2
"Black Cat"	2024	Angel Food, Vol. 2
"Python"	2024	Angel Food, Vol. 2
"Remember the Future"	2024	Angel Food, Vol. 2
"Like the Finish"	2024	Angel Food, Vol. 2

==== As featured artist ====
Title	Year	Album
"The Girl" (Hellberg featuring Cozi Zuehlsdorff)	2015	Non-album single
"Where I'll Be Waiting" (Rich Edwards featuring Cozi Zuehlsdorff)	2016	Non-album single
"Nevada" (Vicetone featuring Cozi Zuehlsdorff)	2016	Non-album single
"Confessions" (MYRNE featuring Cozi Zuehlsdorff)	2017	Non-album single
"Way Back" (Vicetone featuring Cozi Zuehlsdorff)	2018	Non-album single
"Medusa" (Aiobahn featuring Cozi Zuehlsdorff)	2019	Non-album single
"City of Angels" (Damian McGinty featuring Cozi Zuehlsdorff)	2021	Non-album single

== Filmography ==
Film roles
Year	Title	Role	Notes
2011	Dolphin Tale	Hazel Haskett	
2013	Winter: The Dolphin That Can	Narrator	Documentary film
2014	Dolphin Tale 2	Hazel Haskett	
2017	Pure Country: Pure Heart	Piper Spencer	Direct-to-video film

Television roles
Year	Title	Role	Notes
2011	1st Look	Herself (interviewee)	Episode: "Dolphin Tale"
2011	Made in Hollywood	Herself	Episode 7.1
2013	Monday Mornings	Trisha Miller	Episode: "Deus Ex Machina"
2013	Sofia the First	Singer	Episode: "Just One of the Princes"
2013	Liv and Maddie	Ocean	Episodes: "Steal-a-Rooney", "Kang-a-Rooney"
2013–15	Mighty Med	Jordan	Recurring role, 11 episodes
2015	Code Black	Audrey	Episode: "Cardiac Support"
2016	K.C. Undercover	Pinky	Episode: "Catch Him If You Can"
2018	Freaky Friday	Ellie	Disney Channel Original Movie
2022-2023	High School Musical: The Musical: The Series	Reporter	2 episodes and songwriter for 5 episodes
2023	Going Home	Janey Richards	Episode: "Charley's Way"
2025–present	A Week Away: The Series	Lennie	Main role, executive producer, songwriter and writer
