= Antonio Cipriano =

American actor and singer (born 2000)

- Cipriano in 2026
- Born: Antonio Cipriano; May 13, 2000 (age 26); Grosse Pointe Woods, Michigan, U.S.
- Occupations: Actor; singer
- Years active: 2017–present
- Partner(s): Reneé Rapp (2019–2021); Justine Verheul (2023–)
- Website: antoniocipriano.com

Antonio Cipriano (born May 13, 2000) is an American actor and singer. He made his Broadway debut in 2019 playing Phoenix in the musical Jagged Little Pill. On television, he is known for his roles in the Amazon Prime Video series Off Campus (2026), Disney+ series National Treasure: Edge of History (2022) and the Amazon Prime Video series Harlan Coben's Shelter (2023).

== Early life and education ==
Antonio Cipriano was raised in Grosse Pointe, Michigan, in Metro Detroit. He is of Italian and Lebanese descent. His Italian roots come from the city of Palermo, Sicily. He attended Our Lady Star of the Sea Catholic School from preschool through 8th grade and then the University Liggett School from which he graduated in 2018. He was involved in numerous local and school theatre productions and was a member of the Michigan Opera Theatre Children's Chorus.

== Career ==
Cipriano's career began as a high schooler. He represented Michigan at the 2017 National High School Musical Theater Awards (also known as the Jimmy Awards) .

In 2018, he was cast in the original Cambridge, Massachusetts, production of the musical Jagged Little Pill, inspired by the album of the same name by Alanis Morissette. The production played at American Repertory Theater for two-and-a-half months. In January 2019, it was announced the show would transfer to Broadway. In the interim, Cipriano appeared in the original reading of the stage adaption of The Notebook, with music by Ingrid Michaelson, among several other projects. Following previews of Jagged Little Pill, the production opened on Broadway in December 2019. The musical was nominated for fifteen Tony Awards, and won the Grammy for Best Musical Theater Album.

On September 26, 2021, Cipriano announced that he would not be returning to Jagged Little Pill due to alleged transphobic and abusive treatment of the show's non-binary cast members.

Cipriano participating in the MLBx All-Star weekend festivities at Citizens Bank Park in Philadelphia.

Cipriano then went on to star in the Disney+ series National Treasure: Edge of History, based on the National Treasure films.

Since then, he has been a part of numerous projects both on stage and screen including Pretty Little Liars on HBO Max, and Harlan Coben's Shelter on Prime Video.

In 2025, he starred in Angel Studios as main character Max in Angel Studios 'A week away: the series'

In 2026, he starred as John Logan in the Amazon Prime Video series Off Campus.

== Personal life ==
From 2019 to 2021, Cipriano was in a relationship with fellow Broadway actor and singer Reneé Rapp. Since August 2023, he has been in a relationship with performer Justine Verheul.

== Acting credits ==
=== Film ===
Year	Title	Role	Notes
2025	The Alto Knights	Young Vito	

=== Television ===
Year	Title	Role	Notes
2019	God Friended Me	Derrick	Episode: "The Trouble with the Curve"
2019	City on a Hill	Morgan Signa / Signa's Son	2 episodes
2021	The Sex Lives of College Girls	Angelo	2 episodes
2022	National Treasure: Edge of History	Oren	Main cast
2023	Harlan Coben's Shelter	Buck	7 episodes
2024	Pretty Little Liars	Johnny	Recurring
2025	A Week Away: The Series	Max	Main cast
2026–present	Off Campus	John Logan	Main role

=== Theatre ===
Year	Title	Role	Location	Category
2018	Jagged Little Pill	Phoenix	American Repertory Theater	Regional
2019	The Notebook	Young Noah	Powerhouse Theatre	Staged reading
2019–2020	Jagged Little Pill	Phoenix	Broadhurst Theatre	Broadway
2024	Cinderella	Prince Topher	Westport Country Playhouse	Regional
2024	13	Brett	Lawrence Woodmere Academy	Concert
2026	In Pieces (The Musical)	Peter	The Other Palace	4 Show Run

=== Music video ===
Year	Title	Artist
2019	"Wild"	Joey Contreras
2025	"Runaways"	Antonio Cipriano
