= Astronomia (Vicetone remix) =

Single by Vicetone and Tony Igy

from the album Elements
- Released: 9 July 2014
- Genre: EDM
- Length: 3:18
- Label: Sony Music

Music video
- "Astronomia" on YouTube

Audio sample
- A 19-second sample of the song, featuring the section transitioning into the refrain.: file; help

"Astronomia" is a house song by Dutch electronic music duo Vicetone and Russian DJ and record producer Tony Igy, created as a remix of Igy's 2010 song with the same name. It was released on 9 July 2014.

== Background ==
The original Astronomia song was released in Russia in 2010. Vicetone created a remix of the original song in 2014 and sent it to Tony Igy, who liked it. Igy's label did not approve of the remix, so the remix was released for free online.

== Reception ==
In 2020, amidst the COVID-19 pandemic, the song became the subject of the "Coffin Dance" internet meme, which involves the remix playing over a group of Ghanaian pallbearers dancing while carrying a coffin. This was a common funeral tradition in Ghana and parts of Africa with the idea of sending off deceased loved ones in style, rather than in the usual western manner of mourning a loss. The song is also the walk-on song of darts player Gian van Veen, world number three and runner-up in the 2026 World Darts Championship.

== Charts ==
=== Weekly charts ===
Weekly chart performance for "Astronomia"
Chart (2020)	Peak position
Belgium (Ultratip Bubbling Under Flanders)	4
Belgium (Ultratip Bubbling Under Wallonia)	25
France (SNEP)	112
Germany (GfK)	74
Hungary (Single Top 40)	3
Italy (FIMI)	46
Japan (Japan Hot 100) (Billboard)	49
Spain (PROMUSICAE)	61
Sweden (Sverigetopplistan)	91
Switzerland (Schweizer Hitparade)	36
US Hot Dance/Electronic Songs (Billboard)	13

=== Year-end charts ===
Year-end chart performance for "Astronomia"
Chart (2020)	Position
Hungary (Single Top 40)	57
US Hot Dance/Electronic Songs (Billboard)	43

== Certifications ==
Certifications for "Astronomia"
Region	Certification	Certified units/sales
Denmark (IFPI Danmark)	Gold	45,000^{‡}
France (SNEP)	Platinum	200,000^{‡}
Germany (BVMI)	Gold	200,000^{‡}
Italy (FIMI)	Gold	35,000^{‡}
Norway (IFPI Norway)	Platinum	60,000^{‡}
Poland (ZPAV)	Platinum	50,000^{‡}
Spain (PROMUSICAE)	Gold	30,000^{‡}
Streaming
Sweden (GLF)	Platinum	8,000,000^{†}
^{‡} Sales+streaming figures based on certification alone.^{†} Streaming-only figures based on certification alone.
