= Vicetone =

Dutch electronic music DJ and production duo

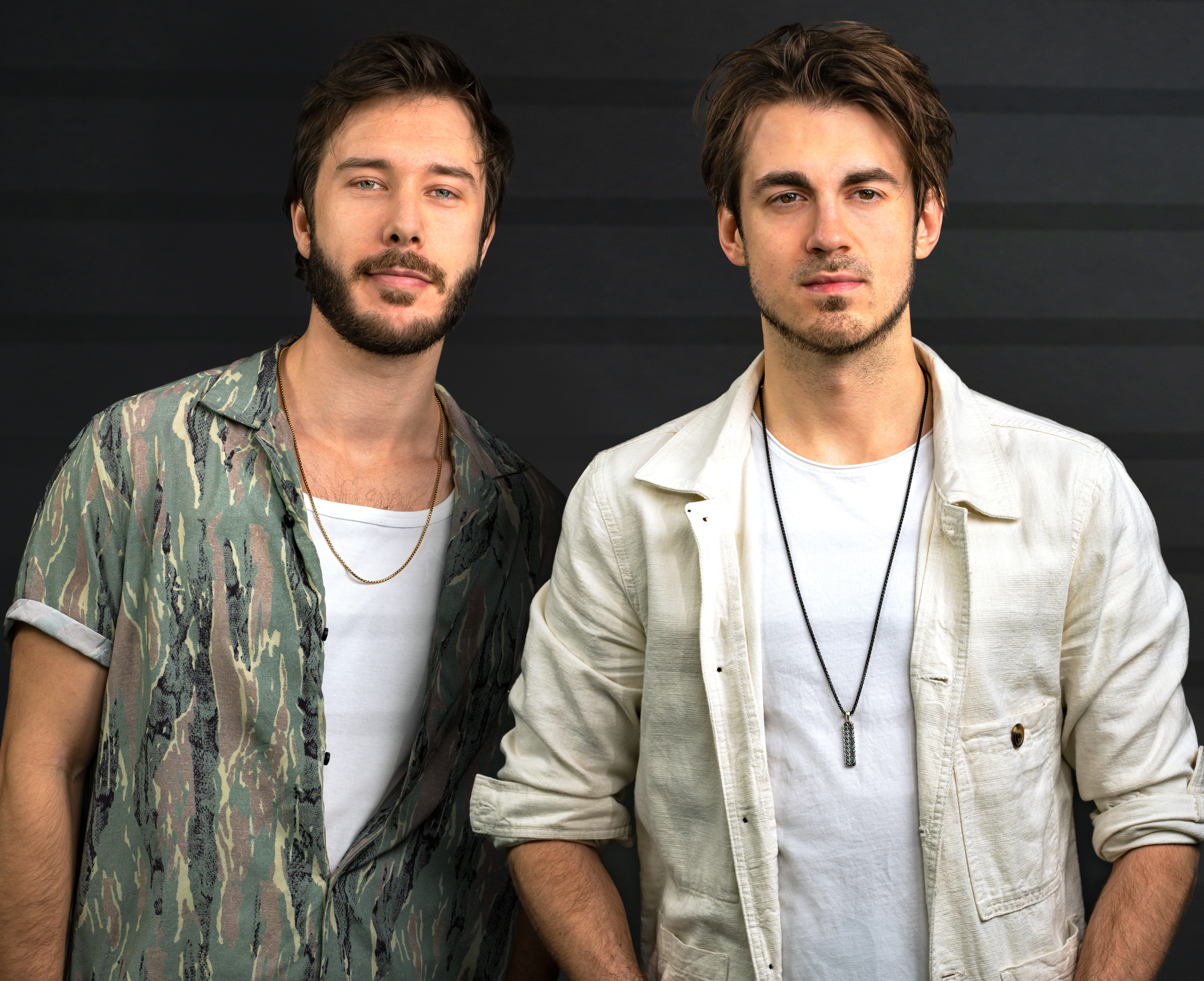
- Vicetone in 2022

Background information
- Origin: Groningen, Netherlands
- Genres: Progressive house; electro house; deep house; future house; nu-disco
- Years active: 2012–present
- Labels: Protocol Recordings; Monstercat; Spinnin'; Armada; Revealed; Ultra; Dim Mak; Vicetone Records
- Members: Ruben den Boer; Victor Pool
- Website: www.vicetone.com

Vicetone is a Dutch electronic music production and DJ duo formed by Ruben den Boer (Dutch pronunciation: [ˈrybə(n) dəm ˈbuːr]; born 22 January 1992) and Victor Pool (pronounced [ˈvɪktɔr poːl]; born 9 July 1992) from Groningen. The duo began as a DJ act, and in 2013, they were voted into the DJ Mag Top 100 DJs list for the first time at 60th as a new entry. Later in 2014, they went up 24 places on the list, coming 36th. In 2015, they fell 14 places to 50th. They made a return to the Top 100, coming in at 83rd in 2019 but dropped out the subsequent year.

== Career ==
In 2015, Vicetone released two singles with Kat Nestel titled "Angels" and "Nothing Stopping Me," both on Ultra Music, released a remix for a song from the popular game League of Legends called "Project Yi" and they remixed Hardwell and Tiesto's collaboration, "Colors".

To start off 2016, Vicetone released a new track on Spinnin' Records called "Pitch Black". This was followed by the release of their first EP entitled Aurora, which was released in April before the beginning of a headline tour of the same name. In June 2016, they released the song 'Nevada' to Monstercat in collaboration with American actress and singer Cozi Zuehlsdorff.

In 2018, Vicetone released another single with Cozi Zuehlsdorff titled "Way Back".

In 2020, Vicetone rose to international stardom over the rise of their 2014 remix of Tony Igy's song "Astronomia" as an internet meme, in which the remix plays over a group of Ghanaian men dancing while carrying a coffin, a common funeral tradition in Ghana and parts of Africa with the idea of sending off deceased loved ones in style, rather than in the usual manner of mourning.

On 22 January 2021, Vicetone announced that their debut album titled "Legacy" would be releasing on 2 April of that same year. This announcement came alongside the release of its lead single, "No Rest".

== Discography ==
=== Albums ===
Title	Details	Peak chart positions
Title	Details	US Dance
Legacy	Released: 2 April 2021; Label: Monstercat	—
"—" denotes a recording that did not chart or was not released.

=== Extended plays ===
Title	Details	Peak chart positions
Title	Details	US Dance
Aurora	Released: 8 April 2016; Label: Spinnin' Records; Format: Digital download	21
Elements	Released: 22 February 2019; Label: Monstercat; Format: Digital download	—
"—" denotes a recording that did not chart or was not released.

=== Singles ===
Title	Year	Peak chart positions	Certifications	Album
Title	Year	US Dance Airplay	Certifications	Album
"Harmony"	2012	—		Non-album singles
"Heartbeat" (featuring Collin McLoughlin)	2013	—		Non-album singles
"Stars" (featuring Jonny Rose)	2013	—		Non-album singles
"Tremble"	2013	—		Non-album singles
"Chasing Time" (featuring Daniel Gidlund)	2013	—		Non-album singles
"Lowdown"	2014	—		Non-album singles
"White Lies" (featuring Chloe Angelides)	2014	—		Non-album singles
"Ensemble"	2014	—		Non-album singles
"Heat"	2014	—		Non-album singles
"Let Me Feel" (with Nicky Romero featuring When We Are Wild)	2014	—		Non-album singles
"United We Dance"	2014	—		Non-album singles
"What I've Waited For" (featuring D. Brown)	2014	—		Non-album singles
"No Way Out" (featuring Kat Nestel)	2015	—		Non-album singles
"Follow Me" (featuring JHart)	2015	—		Non-album singles
"Angels" (featuring Kat Nestel)	2015	—		Non-album singles
"Nothing Stopping Me" (featuring Kat Nestel)	2015	—		Non-album singles
"Catch Me"	2015	—		Non-album singles
"I'm on Fire"	2015	—		Non-album singles
"Pitch Black"	2016	—		Non-album singles
"Hawt Stuff"	2016	—		Non-album singles
"Nevada" (featuring Cozi Zuehlsdorff)	2016	—	RIAA: Gold; MC: Gold	Non-album singles
"Anywhere I Go"	2016	—		Non-album singles
"Astronomia" (with Tony Igy)	2016	_		Non-album singles
"Kaleidoscope" (featuring Grace Grundy)	2016	—		Non-album singles
"Landslide" (with Youngblood Hawke)	2016	—		Non-album singles
"I Hear You"	2017	—		
"Apex"	2017	—		Rocket League x Monstercat Vol. 1
"Collide" (featuring Rosi Golan)	2017	—		Non-album singles
"Fix You" (featuring Kyd the Band)	2018	—		Non-album singles
"Way Back" (featuring Cozi Zuehlsdorff)	2018	—		Non-album singles
"Walk Thru Fire" (featuring Meron Ryan)	2018	—		Non-album singles
"South Beach"	2018	—		Non-album singles
"Something Strange" (featuring Haley Reinhart)	2018	23		Elements
"Fences" (featuring Matt Wertz)	2019	—		Elements
"Waiting" (featuring Daisy Guttridge)	2019	—		Non-album singles
"Ran Out of Reasons" (featuring Meron Ryan and Night Panda)	2019	—		Non-album singles
"Aftermath"	2019	—		Non-album singles
"I Feel Human"	2020	—		Legacy
"Animal" (featuring Jordan Powers and Bekah Novi)	2020	—		Legacy
"Shadow" (featuring Allie X)	2020	—		Legacy
"No Rest"	2021	—		Legacy
"Wish You Were Here" (with Willim featuring Wink XY)	2021	—		Non-album singles
"Barcelona Nights"	2022	—		Non-album singles
"Always Running"	2022	—		Non-album singles
"—" denotes a recording that did not chart or was not released.

=== Production credits ===
Title	Year	Artist	Album
"Afterglow"	2016	Lindsey Stirling	Brave Enough

=== Remixes ===
==== Charted ====
- Tony Igy - Astronomia (Vicetone Remix) (2014)

Chart (2020)	Peak position
Japan Hot 100 (Billboard)	49
US Hot Dance/Electronic Songs (Billboard)	13

==== 2012 ====
- Calvin Harris featuring Ne-Yo – Let's Go (Vicetone Remix)
- Flo Rida – Whistle (Vicetone Remix)
- Adele – Someone Like You (Vicetone Remix)
- Maroon 5 – Payphone (Vicetone Remix)
- Nicky Romero and Fedde le Grand featuring Matthew Koma – Sparks (Vicetone Remix)
- Morgan Page – The Longest Road (Vicetone Remix)
- Youngblood Hawke – We Come Running (Vicetone Remix)
- Zedd – Clarity (Vicetone Remix)

==== 2013 ====
- Hook N Sling vs Nervo – Reason (Vicetone Remix)
- Doctor P. featuring Eva Simons – Bulletproof (Vicetone Remix)
- Cazzette – Weapon (Vicetone Remix)
- David Puentez featuring Shena – The One (Vicetone remix)
- Matthew Koma – One Night (Vicetone Remix)
- Nervo – Hold On (Vicetone Remix)
- Nicky Romero vs. Krewella – Legacy (Vicetone Remix)
- Linkin Park and Steve Aoki - A Light That Never Comes (Vicetone Remix)

==== 2014 ====
- Krewella - Enjoy The Ride (Vicetone Remix)
- Cash Cash - Overtime (Vicetone Remix)
- Dillon Francis, The Chain Gang of 1974, Sultan & Shepard - When We Were Young (Vicetone Remix)

==== 2015 ====
- Urban Cone featuring Tove Lo - Come Back To Me (Vicetone Remix)
- Little Boots - No Pressure (Vicetone Remix)
- Hardwell and Tiësto featuring Andreas Moe - Colors (Vicetone Remix)
- Kelly Clarkson - Invincible (Vicetone Remix)

==== 2016 ====
- Project: Yi (Vicetone Remix) (from League of Legends)
- Vicetone x Bob Marley - Is This Love [Free]
- Bonnie McKee and Vicetone - I Want It All (Remix)
- The Weeknd featuring Daft Punk - Starboy (Vicetone Remix)

==== 2017 ====
- A R I Z O N A - Oceans Away (Vicetone Remix)
- Dua Lipa - New Rules (Vicetone Remix)

==== 2018 ====
- The Prodigy - Omen (Vicetone Remix)
- The Knocks featuring Foster The People - Ride Or Die (Vicetone Remix)

==== 2020 ====
- Alesso featuring Liam Payne - "Midnight" (Vicetone Remix)
