= South Beach, Oregon =

Unincorporated community in the state of Oregon, United States

- Unincorporated community
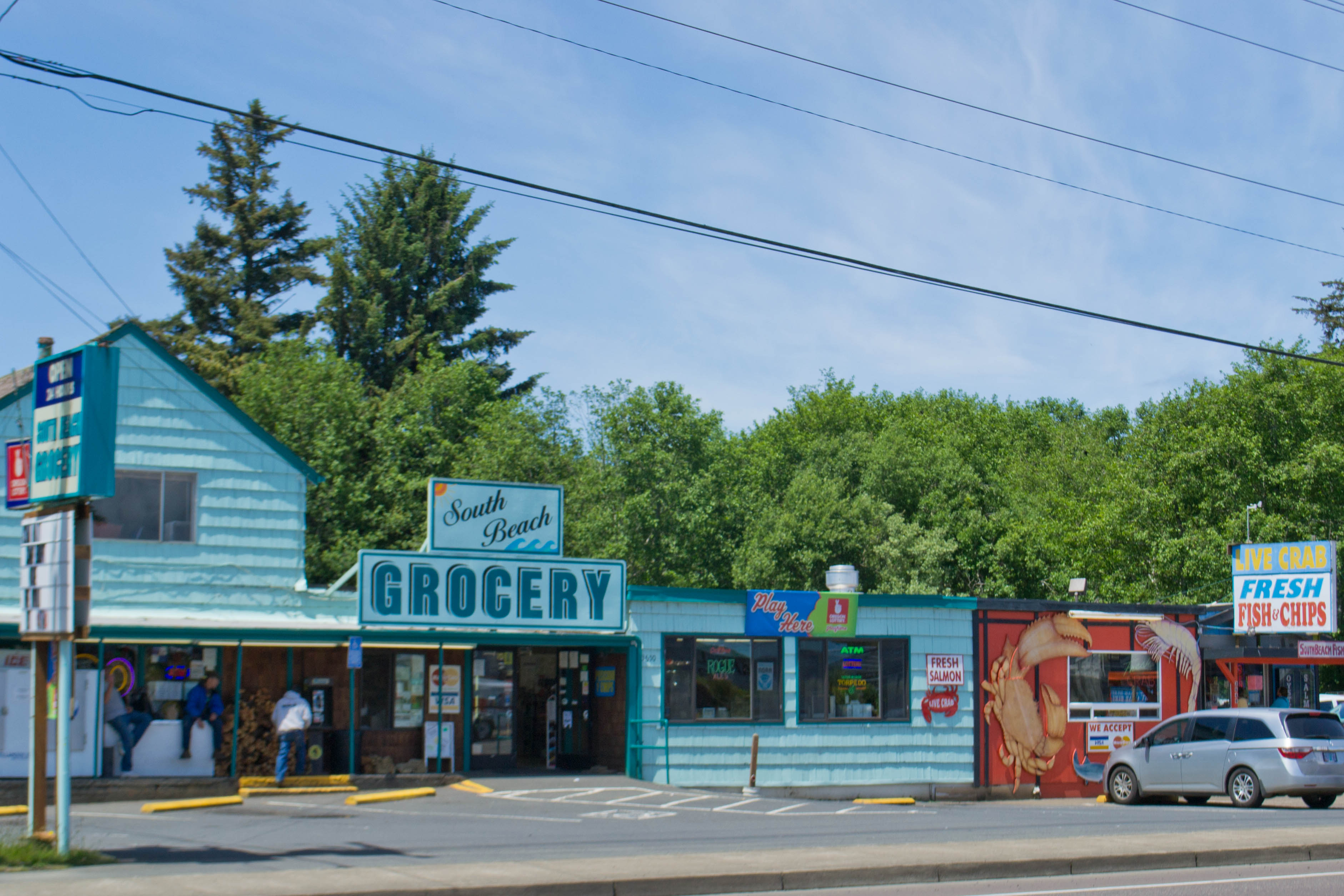
- Stores in South Beach

- Location within Oregon Location within the United States
- Coordinates: 44°36′45″N 124°02′55″W
- Country: United States
- State: Oregon
- County: Lincoln
- Elevation: 13 ft (4.0 m)
- Time zone: UTC-8 (Pacific (PST))
  - Summer (DST): UTC-7 (PDT)
- ZIP code: 97366
- Area code: 541
- GNIS feature ID: 1150095

South Beach is an unincorporated community in Lincoln County, Oregon, United States. South Beach is located along the Pacific coast at Yaquina Bay, 1.5 miles (2.4 km) south of Newport. South Beach has a post office with ZIP code 97366.

== See also ==
- South Beach State Park
