= Tony Igy =

- Born: Anton Aleksandrovich Igumnov; 6 June 1985 (age 40)
- Origin: Kamensk-Shakhtinsky, Russia
- Genres: Electronic dance
- Years active: 2006–present

Anton Aleksandrovich Igumnov (Russian: Антон Александрович Игумнов; born 6 June 1985), professionally known as Tony Igy, is a Russian electronic dance music disc jockey and producer. He is best known for his hit "Astronomia", which was originally released in 2010. A 2014 Vicetone remix of "Astronomia" became a global phenomenon in April 2020 as part of the Coffin dance meme.

== Discography ==
=== Albums ===
- Get Up (2013)
- You Know My Name (2019)

=== Extended plays ===
- This Is My Gift and This My Curse (2010)
- It's Beautiful... It's Enough (2017)

=== Singles ===
2010

- "Astronomia" (Free-Track)

2014

- "Astronomia" (Free-Track; with Vicetone)

2015

- "Run Away" (featuring Bella Blue)
- "Open Fire"

2016

- "Don’t Turn Around" (featuring Syntheticsax)
- "Nelly"
- "Day in Day Out" (with X-Chrome)

2017

- "Caruna"
- "Because of You"
- "Another"
- "Nuera"
- "Let’s Run"
- "I Can See"
- "For You Special"
- "The Dust"
- "Starlight"
- "Sentiment"
- "Misterio"
- "Meduzza"
- "I Wanna See You Now"
- "Civik"
- "The One for Me"
- "Playing"
- "Island"
- "Change"

2018

- "Yes I Do"
- "Show You How"
- "Roscoe’s (Shout Louder)"
- "Take Me Away" (with Gio Nailati featuring Hoshi Soul)

2020

- "Street Sadness"
- "Happy Land"
- "Astronomia (Never Go Home)"
