= South Beach, Durban =

- Location within KwaZulu-Natal Location within South Africa
- Coordinates: 29.8655°S 31.0418°E
- Country: South Africa
- Province: KwaZulu-Natal
- Municipality: eThekwini

Area
  - Total: 2.48 km^{2} (0.96 sq mi)
- Elevation: 13 m (43 ft)

Population (2011)
  - Total: 20,672
  - Density: 8,340/km^{2} (21,600/sq mi)

Racial makeup (2011)
  - Black African: 80.0%
  - Coloured: 3.85%
  - Indian/Asian: 8.6%
  - White: 5.95%
  - Other: 1.6%

First languages (2011)
  - Zulu: 27.8%
  - Xhosa: 9.7%
  - English: 34.7%
  - Afrikaans: 2.9%
  - Other: 24.9%
- Time zone: UTC+2 (SAST)
- Area code: 4001

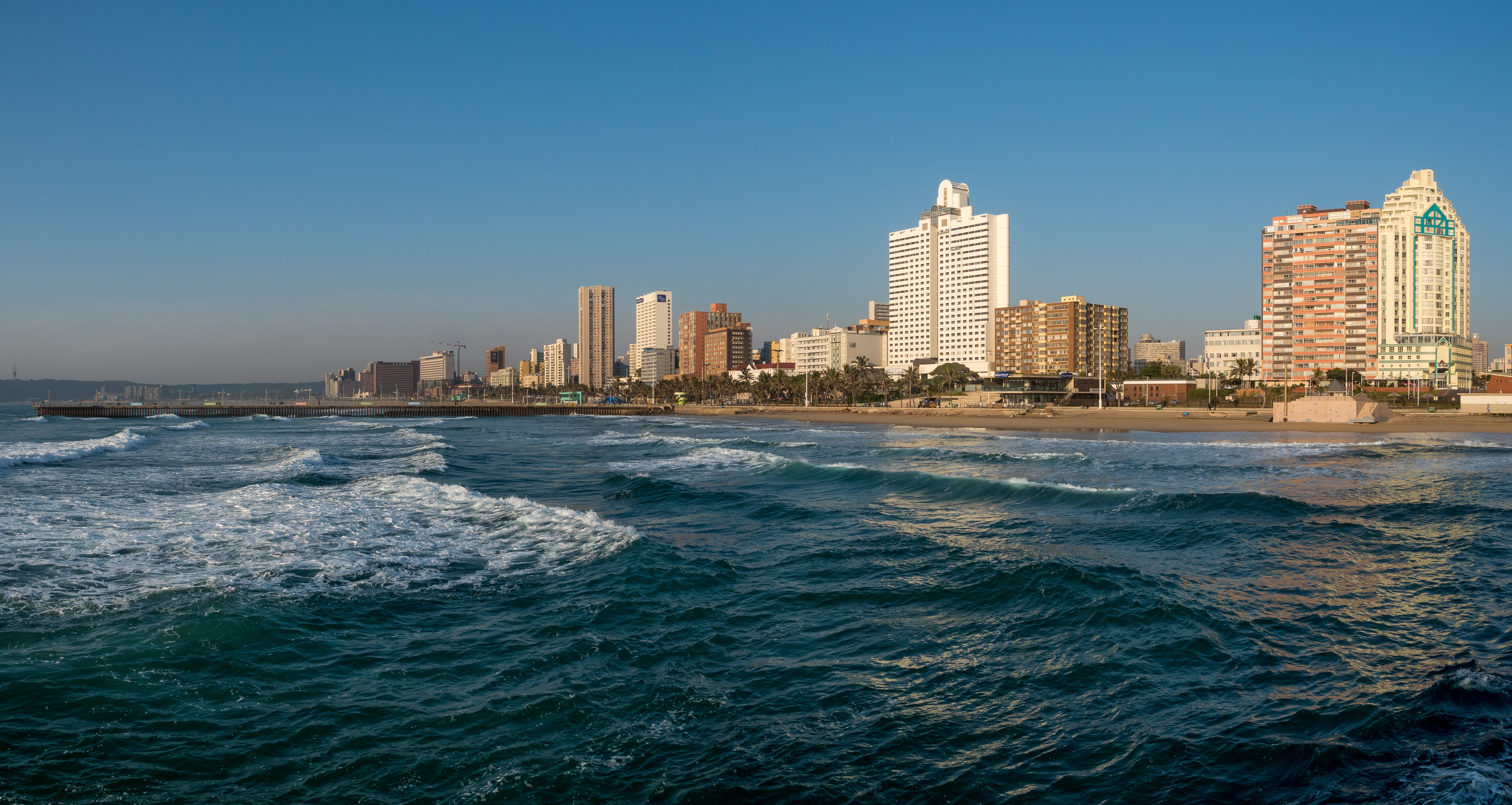
South Beach, Durban, KwaZulu-Natal, South Africa (20504187132).jpg

South Beach is a residential area in central Durban, KwaZulu-Natal, South Africa.
