= Dancing Pallbearers =

Ghanaian group of pallbearers

- Screenshot of a BBC News video clip showing pallbearers dancing with a casket

Background information
- Origin: Prampram, Ghana
- Years active: 2003–present
- Members: Benjamin Aidoo with 4-6 others

Dancing Pallbearers (Note: Also known by a variety of names, including Dancing Coffin, Coffin Dancers, Coffin Dance Meme, or simply Coffin Dance) is the informal name given to a group of pallbearers from Nana Otafrija Pallbearing and Waiting Service who are based in the coastal town of Prampram in the Greater Accra Region of southern Ghana, although they perform across the country and outside of Ghana. The founder and leader of the group is Benjamin Aidoo. Locally, they are referred to as Dada awu ('Daddy's dead'). The group initially gained worldwide attention through a BBC News feature story in 2017. In March 2020, the group became an internet meme when the videos were paired with the EDM song "Astronomia" by Tony Igy, prompting additional popularity through video edits.

== Origin ==
The Dancing Pallbearers are led by Benjamin Aidoo, who started the group as a regular pallbearer service in 2003. He later had the idea of adding choreography to their pallbearing work. Extra fees are charged for dancing with the coffin during a funeral.

The oldest of the reused clips is from YouTube by Travelin Sister from January 22, 2015, though the Dancing Pallbearers first rose to wider prominence in 2017 when they were featured in a BBC News report. The third video, which depicts pallbearers accidentally dropping a coffin during their dance, was first posted by Facebook user "Bigscout Nana Prempeh" on May 2, 2019, and gained over 2,900 reactions, 4,600 shares and 350,000 views in one year.

== Rise ==
The video and similar material gained significant popularity on TikTok as a punchline for fail clips in a manner similar to To Be Continued and We'll Be Right Back memes, implying that the person in the fail video has died. For example, on March 6, 2020, TikTok account Trickshots posted a version of the meme that received over 2.9 million views and 237,000 likes.

On March 30, 2020, a YouTuber named DigiNeko "Matthew Ordrick" uploaded a video to YouTube elevating the trend on the Internet, through mainly being associated with the COVID-19 pandemic, which was ongoing when the meme became popular, receiving over 400 million views. Since the trend, it has been popular on social media, widely uploaded to platforms such as Reddit, YouTube and TikTok. furthering its use for darkly comedic internet memes, videos of people suffering various mishaps, followed by clips of the pallbearers dancing with coffins (implicitly the victims of the preceding clips). The clips are generally paired up at least since February 26, 2020 with the song "Astronomia" by Russian musical artist Tony Igy and remixed by Dutch duo Vicetone, although others use either "You Know I'll Go Get" by Indonesian DJ Haning and Rizky Ayuba (a remixed version of Enrique Iglesias's song "Finally Found You") or Lenka's "Trouble Is a Friend" as an alternate song.

In May 2020, the BBC revisited the pallbearers interviewing them about their rise to fame.

== Other appearances in media ==
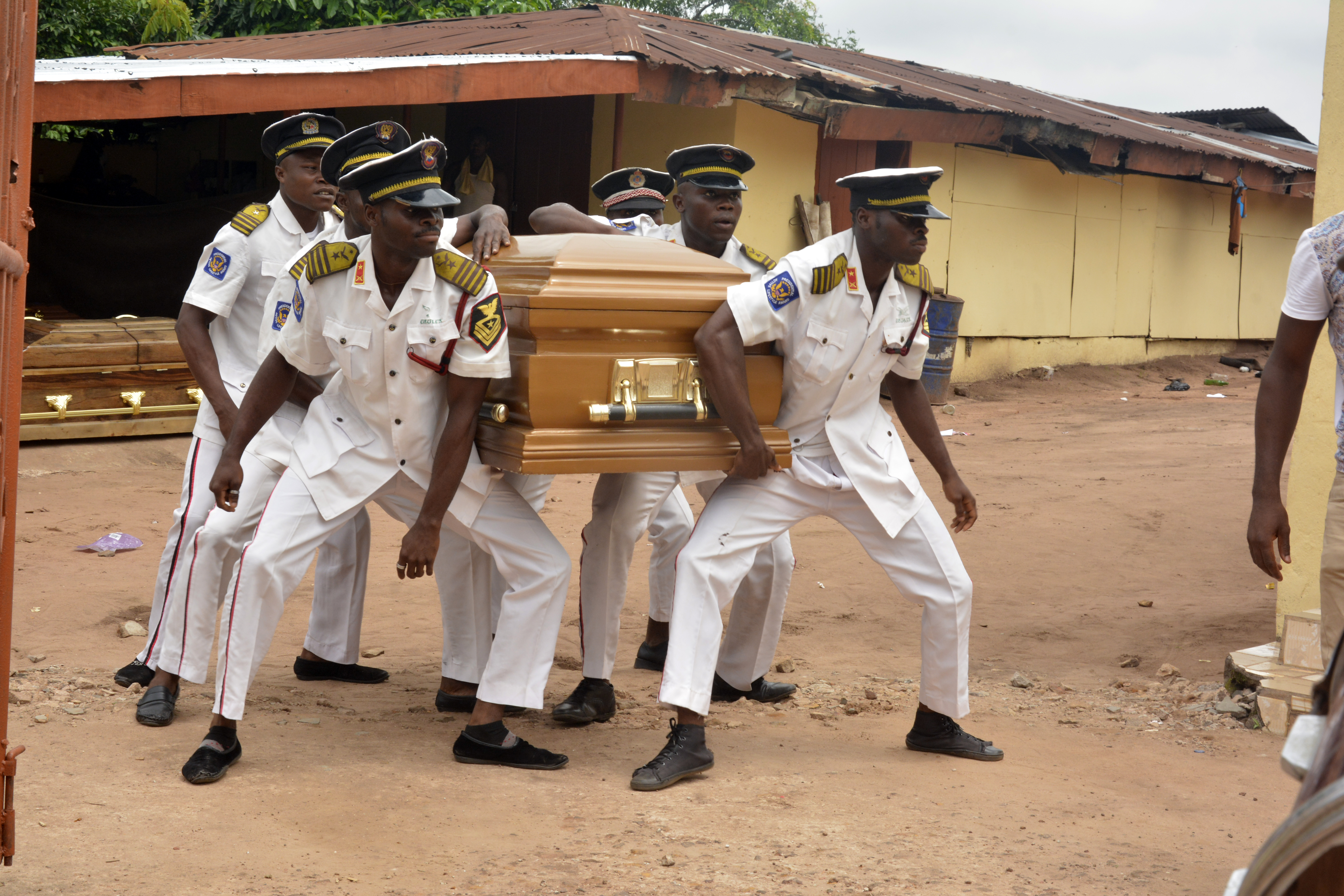
Pallbearers in Nigeria display dancing skills as they carry a casket to a burial site.

The Dancing Pallbearers made appearance in internet memes. For example, an easter egg in Call of Duty: Black Ops Cold War references the meme. In addition, the meme experienced a revival on social media following the White House COVID-19 outbreak in early October 2020, in which then-president Donald Trump tested positive for COVID-19.

The Pallbearers was also used for campaigning for COVID-19 prevention. For instance, in Brazil, in May 2020, the city government of Caldas Novas, in the state of Goiás, installed two billboards showing the coffin dancers and the caption "stay at home or dance with us", to encourage social distancing during the COVID-19 pandemic in Brazil. Soon after, the group released a video where they capitalized on the phrase, encouraging viewers to 'stay home or dance with us'. In Colombia and Peru, policemen imitated the group's dance carrying a coffin on their shoulders, encouraging the community to stay home to stem the spread of the coronavirus. The group also have seen use in politics, when the leaders of New Political Center — Girchi, a political party in Georgia, dressed up in chokhas and made their own version of the video.

== See also ==
- Jazz funeral
