= South Beach State Park =

State park in Oregon, United States

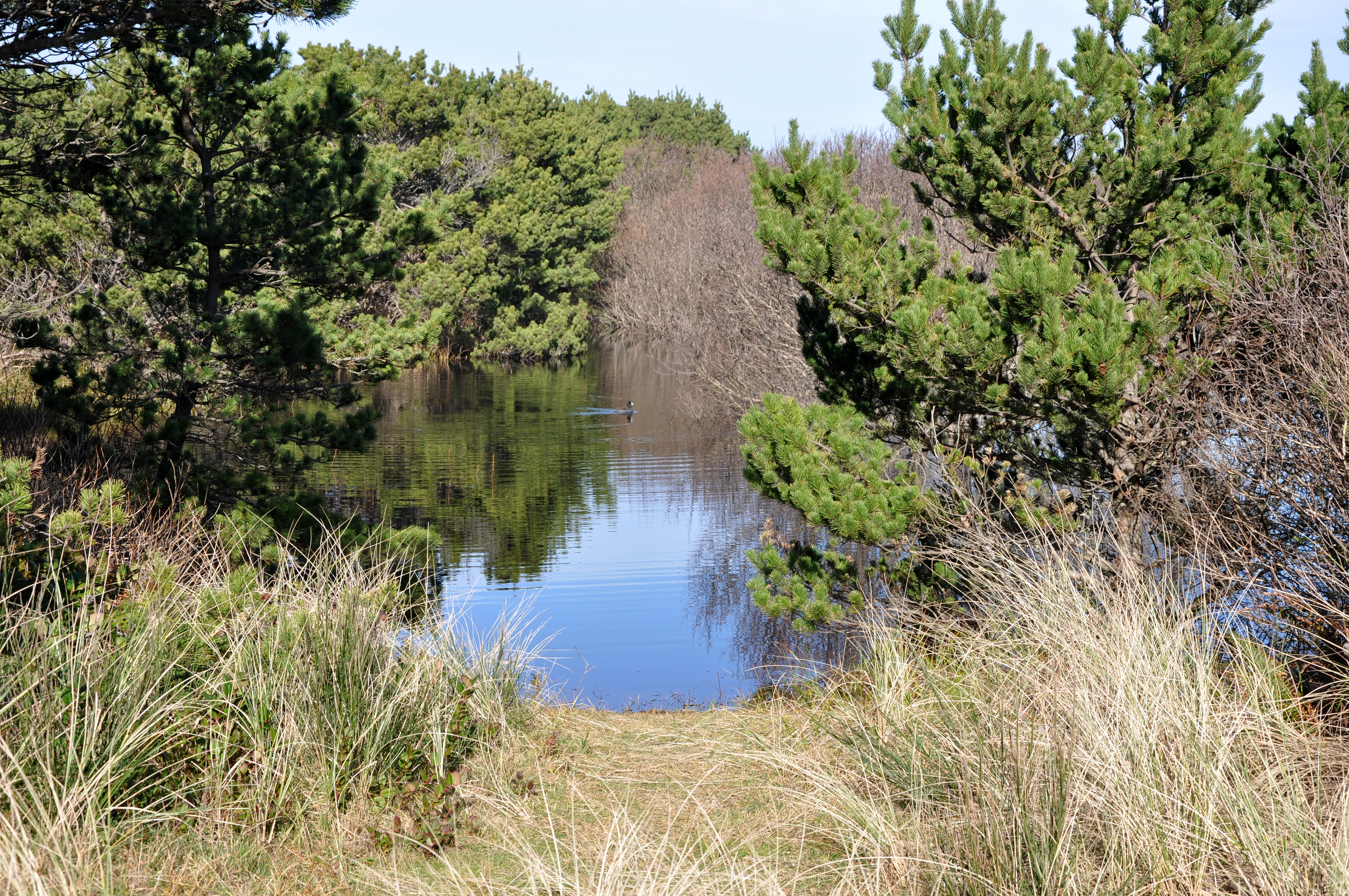
- Pond in the park

- Location within Oregon
- Type: Public, state
- Location: Lincoln County, Oregon
- Nearest city: Newport
- Coordinates: 44°36′14″N 124°03′49″W
- Operator: Oregon Parks and Recreation Department

South Beach State Park is a state park in the U.S. state of Oregon, administered by the Oregon Parks and Recreation Department. It is near the unincorporated community of South Beach.

== At South Beach State Park ==
Camping is available, as are yurts.

Various fossils are found there, as are agates.

== See also ==
- List of Oregon state parks
